= 2020–21 FC Arda Kardzhali season =

Arda
2020–21 season
- Chairman: Petar Peshev
- Manager: Nikolay Kirov
- Stadium: Arena Arda
- First League: 4th
- Bulgarian Cup: Runners-up
- Top goalscorer: League: Ivan Kokonov (9); All: Spas Delev (10)
- Biggest win: 3–0 v. Montana (28 November 2020)
- Biggest defeat: 0–4 v. Tsarsko Selo (25 April 2021)
Home colours	Away colours	Third colours

The 2020–21 season was Arda's second consecutive season in the Bulgarian First League. It was the club's most successful season yet, with the club both reaching the final of the Bulgarian Cup and qualifying for the UEFA Europa Conference League for the first time in their history.

This article shows player statistics and all matches (official and friendly) that the club played during the 2020–21 season.

== Squad ==
As of 31 May 2021

No.	Position	Player	Date of birth (age)	Since	Previous club	Apps.	Goals
Goalkeepers
12	GK	(Bulgaria) Ivan Karadzhov	12 July 1989 (aged 31)	2018	(Belarus) Shakhtyor Soligorsk	82	0
23	GK	(Bulgaria) Mesut Yusuf	14 January 1992 (aged 29)	2019		4	0
36	GK	(Bulgaria) Vasil Simeonov	4 February 1998 (aged 23)	2020	(Bulgaria) Montana	11	0
Defenders
4	DF	(Bulgaria) Milen Stoev	29 September 1999 (aged 21)	2018	(Bulgaria) Vihren Sandanski	40	0
5	DF	(Bulgaria) Petko Ganev	17 September 1996 (aged 24)	2020	(Bulgaria) Litex Lovech	11	0
8	DF	(Bulgaria) Milen Zhelev	17 July 1993 (aged 27)	2020	(Bulgaria) Beroe Stara Zagora	31	2
13	DF	(France) Nicolas Taravel	13 October 1994 (aged 26)	2021	(United States) Oklahoma City Energy	9	0
14	DF	(Bulgaria) Stoycho Atanasov	14 May 1997 (aged 24)	2020	(Bulgaria) CSKA Sofia	4	0
20	DF	(Bulgaria) Deyan Lozev	26 October 1993 (aged 27)	2020	(Bulgaria) Levski Sofia	76	2
22	DF	(Greece) Manolis Roussakis	15 February 1996 (aged 25)	2021	(Greece) Xanthi	1	0
24	DF	(Bulgaria) Alex Petkov	25 July 1999 (aged 21)	2021	(Bulgaria) Levski Sofia	15	1
25	DF	(Bulgaria) Radoslav Uzunov	25 March 2006 (aged 15)	2021	Youth Team	2	0
71	DF	(Bulgaria) Plamen Krumov	4 November 1985 (aged 35)	2018	(Bulgaria) Lokomotiv Plovdiv	72	4
77	DF	(Bulgaria) Martin Kostadinov	13 May 1996 (aged 25)	2020	(Bulgaria) Cherno More	18	0
Midfielders
11	MF	(Bulgaria) Aleksandar Georgiev	10 October 1997 (aged 23)	2019	(Bulgaria) Etar	45	1
17	MF	(Bulgaria) Ivan Kokonov	17 August 1991 (aged 29)	2019	(Bulgaria) Cherno More	72	16
19	MF	(Bulgaria) Rumen Rumenov	7 June 1993 (aged 27)	2020	(Bulgaria) Etar	40	3
27	MF	(Bulgaria) Emil Martinov	18 March 1992 (aged 29)	2019	(Azerbaijan) Sabail	66	0
30	MF	(Bulgaria) Okan Topcu	16 January 2004 (aged 17)	2021	Youth Team	0	0
33	MF	(Bulgaria) Ivan Tilev	4 March 1999 (aged 22)	2020	(Bulgaria) Septemvri Sofia	34	3
80	MF	(Bulgaria) Lachezar Kotev	5 January 1998 (aged 23)	2020	(Bulgaria) Vitosha Bistritsa	31	0
Forwards
9	FW	(Bulgaria) Spas Delev	22 September 1989 (aged 31)	2019	(Poland) Pogoń Szczecin	52	11
18	FW	(Bulgaria) Georgi Atanasov	6 March 2004 (aged 17)	2021	(Bulgaria) Levski Sofia	13	0
37	FW	(Brazil) Juninho	26 February 1999 (aged 22)	2020	(Brazil) Sport Recife	12	4
98	FW	(Bulgaria) Tonislav Yordanov	27 November 1998 (aged 22)	2021	(Bulgaria) CSKA Sofia	21	8
Players who have left the club
7	MF	(Bulgaria) Mihail Aleksandrov	11 June 1989 (aged 31)	2019	(Russia) Arsenal Tula	10	0
10	MF	(Bulgaria) Svetoslav Kovachev	14 March 1998 (aged 23)	2020	(Bulgaria) Ludogorets Razgrad	25	5
14	FW	(Croatia) Andrija Bubnjar	29 June 1997 (aged 23)	2020	(Slovenia) Mura	4	0
15	MF	(France) Moussa Haddad	15 May 1998 (aged 23)	2020	(France) Sochaux B	4	0
22	MF	(Croatia) Lovre Knežević	22 July 1998 (aged 22)	2020	(Slovenia) Beltinci	9	1
24	DF	(Iraq) Rebin Sulaka	12 April 1992 (aged 29)	2020	(Serbia) Radnički Niš	12	0
25	MF	(Brazil) Matheus Leoni	20 September 1991 (aged 29)	2019	(Bulgaria) Beroe	30	1
99	FW	(Bulgaria) Radoslav Vasilev	12 October 1990 (aged 30)	2019	(Bulgaria) Cherno More	32	12

== Transfers ==
=== In ===
Date	Position	Player	From	Fee	Source
20 July 2020	GK	(Bulgaria) Vasil Simeonov	(Bulgaria) Montana	Free transfer	
22 July 2020	DF	(Bulgaria) Petko Ganev	(Bulgaria) Litex	Free transfer	
1 August 2020	DF	(Bulgaria) Deyan Lozev	(Bulgaria) Levski Sofia	Free transfer	
1 August 2020	MF	(Bulgaria) Ivan Tilev	(Bulgaria) Septemvri Sofia	Undisclosed	
1 August 2020	MF	(Bulgaria) Lachezar Kotev	(Bulgaria) Vitosha	Free transfer	
1 August 2020	MF	(Croatia) Lovre Knežević	(Slovenia) Beltinci	Undisclosed	
3 August 2020	FW	(Croatia) Andrija Bubnjar	(Slovenia) Mura	Free transfer	
15 August 2020	DF	(Iraq) Rebin Sulaka	Unattached (Note: Sulaka previously left Radnički Niš on 1 January 2020.)	Free transfer	
1 September 2020	MF	(France) Moussa Haddad	(France) Sochaux B	Free transfer	
14 September 2020	FW	(Brazil) Juninho	(Brazil) Sport Recife	Free transfer	
13 January 2021	DF	(France) Nicolas Taravel	(United States) Oklahoma City Energy	Free transfer	
13 January 2021	FW	(Bulgaria) Georgi Atanasov	(Bulgaria) Levski Sofia	Undisclosed	
29 January 2021	FW	(Bulgaria) Tonislav Yordanov	(Bulgaria) CSKA Sofia	€50,000	
2 March 2021	DF	(Bulgaria) Alex Petkov	(Bulgaria) Levski Sofia	Free transfer	

=== Out ===
Date	Position	Player	To	Fee	Source
1 July 2020	GK	(Bulgaria) Nikolay Bankov	(Bulgaria) Septemvri Sofia	Free transfer	
1 July 2020	DF	(England) Connor Randall	(Scotland) Ross County	Free transfer	
2 July 2020	MF	(Bulgaria) Dimitar Atanasov	(Bulgaria) Levski Chepintsi	Free transfer	
12 July 2020	FW	(Bulgaria) Ahmed Osman	(Bulgaria) Dimitrovgrad	Free transfer	
15 July 2020	DF	(Bulgaria) Atanas Krastev	Unattached	Released	
17 July 2020	DF	(Netherlands) Darren Sidoel	(Spain) Córdoba	Free transfer	
1 August 2020	MF	(Netherlands) Lucas Willian	Unattached	Released	
12 August 2020	MF	(Armenia) Rumyan Hovsepyan	(Armenia) Alashkert	Free transfer	
31 August 2020	FW	(Belgium) Elisha Sam	(England) Notts County	Free transfer	
3 October 2020	FW	(Bulgaria) Radoslav Vasilev	(Greece) Xanthi	Free transfer	
1 January 2021	FW	(Bulgaria) Eray Karadayi	(Bulgaria) Spartak Plovdiv	Free transfer	
7 January 2021	MF	(Croatia) Lovre Knežević	(Bulgaria) Etar	Free transfer	
12 January 2021	DF	(Iraq) Rebin Sulaka	(Bulgaria) Levski Sofia	Free transfer	
18 January 2021	DF	(Brazil) Matheus Leoni	(Hungary) Kisvárda	Free transfer	
10 February 2021	FW	(Croatia) Andrija Bubnjar	(Croatia) HNK Cibalia	Undisclosed	
10 February 2021	MF	(France) Moussa Haddad	Unattached	Released	
26 February 2021	MF	(Bulgaria) Mihail Aleksandrov	(Bulgaria) Slavia Sofia	Free transfer	

=== Loans in ===
Start date	End date	Position	Player	From	Fee	Source
13 January 2021	30 June 2021	DF	(Greece) Manolis Roussakis	(Greece) Xanthi	Undisclosed	

=== Loans out ===
Start date	End date	Position	Player	To	Fee	Source
25 February 2020	30 June 2021	FW	(Bulgaria) Petar Hristov	(Bulgaria) Litex	Undisclosed	
9 July 2020	1 January 2021	FW	(Bulgaria) Eray Karadayi	(Bulgaria) Dobrudzha	Undisclosed	
5 October 2020	7 January 2021	DF	(Bulgaria) Martin Kostadinov	(Bulgaria) Botev Vratsa	Undisclosed	
1 January 2021	30 June 2021	MF	(Bulgaria) Emirdzhan Syuleyman	(Bulgaria) Dimitrovgrad	Undisclosed	

== Friendlies ==
=== Pre-season ===
30 May 2020	Beroe (Bulgaria)	1–0	(Bulgaria) Arda	Stara Zagora
17:00 EEST (UTC+3)	Kamburov 16'	Report		Stadium: Lokomotiv

18 July 2020	Arda (Bulgaria)	1–1	(Bulgaria) Hebar	Stara Zagora
18:00 EET (UTC+2)	Kokonov 76'	Report	Dimitrov 58'	Stadium: Trace Arena

22 July 2020	Septemvri Simitli (Bulgaria)	0–1	(Bulgaria) Arda	Simitli
18:00 EET (UTC+2)		Report	Hassani 56'	Stadium: Struma

25 July 2020	Slavia Sofia (Bulgaria)	1–4	(Bulgaria) Arda	Bansko
18:30 EET (UTC+2)	Yomov 24'	Report	Georgiev 30'; Kokonov 54'; Bubnjar 85', 90'	Stadium: Terenite na Evima Futbol

31 July 2020	Pirin (Bulgaria)	2–0	(Bulgaria) Arda	Blagoevgrad
10:30 EET (UTC+2)	Valchanov 60', 81' (pen.)	Report		Stadium: Hristo Botev

=== Mid-season ===
4 September 2020	Arda (Bulgaria)	3–0	(Bulgaria) Lokomotiv GO	Stara Zagora
11:00 EEST (UTC+3)	Vasilev 20'; Tilev 39'; Bubnjar 79'	Report		Stadium: Trace Arena

14 November 2020	Arda (Bulgaria)	1–0	(Bulgaria) Hebar	Stara Zagora
14:30 EEST (UTC+3)	Juninho 63'	Report		Stadium: Trace Arena

22 January 2021	Zagłębie Lubin (Poland)	3–1	(Bulgaria) Arda	Belek, Turkey
15:00 EEST (UTC+3)	Starzyński 8'; Crnomarković 37'; Szysz 79'	Report	Juninho 55'	Stadium: Susesi Sport Center A

27 January 2021	Kyzylzhar (Kazakhstan)	3–2	(Bulgaria) Arda	Serik, Turkey
15:00 EEST (UTC+3)	Drachenko 15' (pen.); 29'; 54'	Report	Georgiev 2'; Juninho 82'	Stadium: IC Hotels Santai

29 January 2021	Oleksandria (Ukraine)	1–3	(Bulgaria) Arda	Alanya, Turkey
16:00 EEST (UTC+3)	Dubra 26'	Report	Juninho 48', 90'; Delev 75' (pen.)	Stadium: Gold City Sports Complex Field 1

2 February 2021	Inhulets Petrove (Ukraine)	2–1	(Bulgaria) Arda	Alanya, Turkey
15:00 EEST (UTC+3)	Taravel 20' (o.g.); Vasin 68'	Report	Juninho 39'	Stadium: Gold City Sports Complex Field 1

5 February 2021	Samgurali Tskaltubo (Georgia (country))	0–0	(Bulgaria) Arda	Evrenseki, Turkey
13:30 EEST (UTC+3)		Report

27 March 2021	Arda (Bulgaria)	4–1	(Bulgaria) Sozopol	Kardzhali
14:30 EEST (UTC+3)	Tilev 36'; Yordanov 38'; Kokonov 43'; Lozev 88'	Report	Feradov 17'	Stadium: Arena Arda

== Competitions ==
=== Bulgarian First league ===
==== Regular season ====
===== Table =====
Pos	Team	Pld	W	D	L	GF	GA	GD	Pts	Qualification
2	Lokomotiv Plovdiv	26	15	7	4	41	19	+22	52	Qualification for the Championship group
3	CSKA Sofia	26	14	8	4	39	20	+19	50	Qualification for the Championship group
4	Arda	26	12	9	5	36	29	+7	45	Qualification for the Championship group
5	CSKA 1948	26	10	8	8	34	30	+4	38	Qualification for the Championship group
6	Beroe	26	10	7	9	38	28	+10	37 (Note: Head-to-head points (GD): Beroe 3 (+3), Cherno More 3 (-3).)	Qualification for the Championship group

Source: Soccerway, Bulgarian Football
Rules for classification: 1) Points; 2) Head-to-head points; 3) Head-to-head goal difference; 4) Head-to-head goals scored; 5) Head-to-head away goals scored (only if two teams); 6) Goal difference; 7) Goals scored; 8) Fairplay ranking; 9) Draw.

===== Results summary =====
Overall								Home						Away					
Pld	W	D	L	GF	GA	GD	Pts	W	D	L	GF	GA	GD	W	D	L	GF	GA	GD
26	12	9	5	36	29	+7	45	8	4	1	23	14	+9	4	5	4	13	15	−2

Last updated: 26 April 2021.
Source: See Results

===== Results by round =====
Matchday	1	2	3	4	5	6	7	8	9	10	11	12	13	14	15	16	17	18	19	20	21	22	23	24	25	26
Ground	A	H	A	H	A	H	A	H	A	H	A	A	H	H	A	H	A	H	A	H	A	H	A	H	H	A
Result	D	D	W	W	D	W	L	D	D	D	W	D	W	W	W	D	W	W	L	W	L	L	D	W	W	L
Position	5	9	5	6	5	3	4	5	5	7	6	5	4	3	4	4	4	4	4	4	4	4	4	4	4	4

Source: See Results
A = Away; H = Home; W = Win; D = Draw; L = Loss

==== Matches ====
8 August 2020 1	Montana	3–3	Arda	Montana
17:45 EEST (UTC+3)	Petrov 48', (yellow card) 70'; Baldzhiyski 49' , (yellow card) 68'; Aytov 82'; Orlinov (yellow card) 86'; Tasev (yellow card) 89'	Report	Kotev (yellow card) 27'; Zhelev 33', (yellow card) 53'; Kovachev 34'; Stoev (yellow card) 50'; Petrov 90' (o.g.)	Stadium: Ogosta; Referee: Vasimir El Hatib

15 August 2020 2	Arda	1–1	Levski Sofia	Kardzhali
20:00 EEST (UTC+3)	Kokonov 8'; Lozev (yellow card) 39'; Martinov (yellow card) 87'	Report	Naydenov (yellow card) 4' (yellow-red card) 53'; Paulinho 49'; Dasquet (yellow card) 81'	Stadium: Arena Arda; Referee: Stanislav Todorov

24 August 2020 3	CSKA 1948	0–2	Arda	Sofia
21:00 EEST (UTC+3)	Ivanov (yellow card) 23'; Vasilev (yellow card) 57'; Pirgov (yellow card) 67'	Report	Delev 14'; Leoni (yellow card) 57'; Kokonov 59'; Simeonov (yellow card) 75'; Aleksandrov (yellow card) 88'	Stadium: Natsionalen stadion Vasil Levski; Referee: Radoslav Gidzhenov

29 August 2020 4	Arda	3–2	Botev Plovdiv	Kardzhali
17:00 EEST (UTC+3)	Kokonov 29', 70' (pen.); Delev 85', (yellow card) 85'; Leoni (yellow card) 87'; Knežević (yellow card) 90'	Report	Iliev 1', 45'; Dobrev (yellow card) 45'; Johnathan (yellow card) 64' (yellow-red card) 87'; Shopov (yellow card) 83'	Stadium: Arena Arda; Referee: Georgi Kabakov

11 September 2020 5	Botev Vratsa	0–0	Arda	Vratsa
18:45 EEST (UTC+3)	Tom (yellow card) 33'; Genov (yellow card) 50'	Report	Martinov (yellow card) 19'; Krumov (yellow card) 44' (yellow-red card) 49'; Rumenov (yellow card) 65'; Lozev (yellow card) 84'	Stadium: Hristo Botev; Referee: Nikolay Yordanov

21 September 2020 6	Arda	2–1	Slavia Sofia	Kardzhali
20:30 EEST (UTC+3)	Karadzhov (yellow card) 57'; Kokonov 74'; Vasilev 82'; Rumenov (yellow card) 82'	Report	Popadiyn (yellow card) 33'; Kirilov 39'; Stoev (yellow card) 71'	Stadium: Arena Arda; Referee: Valentin Zhelezov

27 September 2020 7	Cherno More	2–0	Arda	Varna
18:45 EEST (UTC+3)	Coureur 30', 47'	Report	Georgiev (yellow card) 13'; Ganev (yellow card) 63'; Delev (yellow card) 77'	Stadium: Ticha; Referee: Georgi Davidov

20 October 2020 9	Lokomotiv Plovdiv	0–0	Arda	Plovdiv
19:30 EEST (UTC+3)	Umarbayev (yellow card) 24'; Tsvetanov (yellow card) 86'	Report	Delev (yellow card) 64'; Kotev (yellow card) 64'; Kovachev (yellow card) 64'	Stadium: Lokomotiv; Referee: Nikola Popov

25 October 2020 10	Arda	1–1	CSKA Sofia	Kardzhali
17:45 EET (UTC+2)	Sulaka (yellow card) 32'; Ganev (yellow card) 56'; Kokonov (yellow card) 65'; Kovachev 73'; Karadzhov (yellow card) 90'; Rumenov (yellow card) 90'	Report	Youga (yellow card) 58'; Sinclair 84'	Stadium: Arena Arda; Referee: Radoslav Gidzhenov

31 October 2020 11	Beroe	0–1	Arda	Stara Zagora
18:45 EET (UTC+2)	Erivaldo (yellow card) 45'; Angelov (yellow card) 78'	Report	Delev 56'; Karadzhov (yellow card) 87'; Martinov (yellow card) 88'	Stadium: Beroe; Referee: Stanislav Todorov

8 November 2020 12	Etar	0–0	Arda	Veliko Tarnovo
12:30 EET (UTC+2)	Pehlivanov (yellow card) 34'; Katsarov (yellow card) 73'; Dobrev (yellow card) 89'; Ivanov (yellow card) 90+3'	Report	Zhelev (yellow card) 31'; Kokonov (yellow card) 37'; Martinov (yellow card) 51'; Tilev (yellow card) 60'	Stadium: Ivaylp; Referee: Ivaylo Stoyanov

23 November 2020 13	Arda	2–0	Tsarsko Selo	Kardzhali
17:30 EET (UTC+2)	Martinov (yellow card) 13'; Rumenov 33', (yellow card) 60'; Kovachev 40', (yellow card) 70'	Report	Luis Pedro (yellow card) 60'; Manev (yellow card) 71'	Stadium: Arena Arda; Referee: Dimo Dimov

28 November 2020 14	Arda	3–0	Montana	Kardzhali
13:00 EET (UTC+2)	Sulaka (yellow card) 24'; Kokonov 30'; Rumenov 63'; Kotev (yellow card) 65'; Delev 70'	Report	Angelov (red card) 40'	Stadium: Arena Arda; Referee: Volen Chinkov

5 December 2020 15	Levski Sofia	1–2	Arda	Sofia
16:30 EET (UTC+2)	Raynov (yellow card) 26'; Paulinho 89'	Report	Leoni 41'; Kokonov (yellow card) 44', (goal) 90'; Kovachev (yellow card) 50'; Kotev (yellow card) 84'; Zhelev (yellow card) 87'	Stadium: Vivacom Arena - Georgi Asparuhov; Referee: Ivaylo Stoyanov

11 December 2020 16	Arda	1–1	CSKA 1948	Kardzhali
17:30 EET (UTC+2)	Sulaka (yellow card) 52'; Tilev (yellow card) 71'; Kokonov 74' (pen.)	Report	Topuzov (yellow card) 20'; Marin (yellow card) 49'; Kamburov 62'; Shopov (yellow card) 74'; Pirgov (yellow card) 74'; Ivanov (yellow card) 90+1'	Stadium: Arena Arda; Referee: Nikola Popov

17 December 2020 8	Arda	2–2	Ludogorets	Kardzhali
17:30 EET (UTC+2)	Delev 17'; Lozev (yellow card) 51'; Kotev (yellow card) 67'; Juninho 84'	Report	Despodov 11'; Grigore 70'; Keșerü (yellow card) 73'; Sá (yellow card) 90+6'	Stadium: Arena Arda; Referee: Georgi Davidov
Note: Match originally scheduled for 4 October 2020.

12 February 2021 17	Botev Plovdiv	0–2	Arda	Plovdiv
17:30 EET (UTC+2)	Rabotov (yellow card) 31'; Cikarski (yellow card) 55'	Report	Juninho 12', 53'; Stoev (yellow card) 29'; Taravel (yellow card) 65'	Stadium: Futbolen kompleks Botev 1912; Referee: Dragomir Draganov

20 February 2021 18	Arda	3–2	Botev Vratsa	Kardzhali
12:30 EET (UTC+2)	Juninho 3'; Krumov 29'; Taravel (yellow card) 40'; Delev 85'; Lozev (yellow card) 90+4'	Report	N'Diaye (yellow card) 28' (yellow-red card) 35'; Zehirov (yellow card) 45'; Ivaylov (yellow card) 60', (goal) 82'; Genov 74'	Stadium: Arena Arda; Referee: Dimitar Dimitrov

27 February 2021 19	Slavia Sofia	3–2	Arda	Sofia
12:15 EET (UTC+2)	Makrillos 17', 72'; Valchev 55', (yellow card) 74'; Antovski (yellow card) 90+3'	Report	Yordanov 15'; Rumenov 41'	Stadium: Slavia; Referee: Stanislav Todorov

6 March 2021 20	Arda	1–0	Cherno More	Kardzhali
15:00 EET (UTC+2)	Martinov (yellow card) 26'; Taravel (yellow card) 28'; Tilev 44'; Georgiev (yellow card) 78'	Report	Panayotov (yellow card) 65'; Dimov (yellow card) 68'	Stadium: Arena Arda; Referee: Georgi Kabakov

12 March 2021 21	Ludogorets	1–0	Arda	Razgrad
17:00 EET (UTC+2)	Abel (yellow card) 69'; Wanderson 90+5'	Report	Martinov (yellow card) 77'; Georgiev (yellow card) 83' (yellow-red card) 90'; Karadzhov (yellow card) 90+6'	Stadium: Huvepharma Arena; Referee: Ivaylo Stoyanov

20 March 2021 22	Arda	0–2	Lokomotiv Plovdiv	Kardzhali
15:00 EET (UTC+2)	Petkov (yellow card) 36'; Krumov (yellow card) 86'	Report	Gomis (yellow card) 9'; Iliev (yellow card) 15', (goal) 54'; Ilic 47'	Stadium: Arena Arda; Referee: Georgi Dimitrov

10 April 2021 23	CSKA Sofia	1–1	Arda	Sofia
20:00 EEST (UTC+3)	Caicedo 68'; Mitkov (yellow card) 79'; Koch (yellow card) 90+3'	Report	Georgiev (yellow card) 70'; Yordanov 90+4' (pen.)	Stadium: Balgarska Armia; Referee: Vasimir El Hatib

17 April 2021 24	Arda	1–0	Beroe	Kardzhali
20:00 EEST (UTC+3)	Tilev (yellow card) 17'; Kotev (yellow card) 56'; Zhelev (yellow card) 59'; Yordanov 69'; Lozev (yellow card) 87'	Report	Octávio (yellow card) 45'; Vasilev (yellow card) 68'; Mézague (yellow card) 75'; Fall (penalty missed) 89'; Hassani (yellow card) 89'; Makouta (yellow card) 90+1'	Stadium: Arena Arda; Referee: Ivaylo Stoyanov

20 April 2021 25	Arda	3–2	Etar	Kardzhali
18:15 EEST (UTC+3)	Tilev 21'; Yordanov 72'; Yordanov (yellow card) 75'; Zhelev 78'; Rumenov (yellow card) 81'	Report	Mechev (yellow card) 28'; Missi Mezu 43'; Krachunov (yellow card) 76'; Mladenov 89'	Stadium: Arena Arda; Referee: Georgi Ivanov

25 April 2021 26	Tsarsko Selo	4–0	Arda	Sofia
19:45 EEST (UTC+3)	Manev 17', 34'; Mertens (yellow card) 30'; Cordeiro 45', 76'; Luis Pedro (yellow card) 50'; Popadiyn (yellow card) 84'	Report	Stoev (yellow card) 78'	Stadium: Arena Tsarsko Selo; Referee: Stanislav Todorov

==== Championship round ====
===== Table =====
Pos	Team	Pld	W	D	L	GF	GA	GD	Pts	Qualification
1	Ludogorets Razgrad (C)	31	22	4	5	69	29	+40	70	Qualification for the Champions League first qualifying round
2	Lokomotiv Plovdiv	31	17	10	4	48	23	+25	61	Qualification for the Europa Conference League second qualifying round (Note: CSKA Sofia qualified for the Europa Conference League second qualifying round by winning the 2020–21 Bulgarian Cup.)
3	CSKA Sofia	31	17	8	6	46	24	+22	59	Qualification for the Europa Conference League second qualifying round
4	Arda (O)	31	13	11	7	42	37	+5	50	Qualification for the Europa Conference League play-off
5	CSKA 1948	31	12	11	8	41	34	+7	47	
6	Beroe	31	10	9	12	42	38	+4	39	

Source: Soccerway
Rules for classification: 1) Points; 2) Head-to-head points; 3) Head-to-head goal difference; 4) Head-to-head goals scored; 5) Head-to-head away goals scored (only if two teams); 6) Goal difference; 7) Goals scored; 8) Fairplay ranking; 9) Draw.
(C) Champions; (O) Play-off winners

===== Results summary =====
Overall								Home						Away					
Pld	W	D	L	GF	GA	GD	Pts	W	D	L	GF	GA	GD	W	D	L	GF	GA	GD
5	1	2	2	6	8	−2	5	0	2	0	3	3	0	1	0	2	3	5	−2

Last updated: 26 May 2021.
Source: See Results

===== Results by round =====
Game	1	2	3	4	5
Ground	A	A	H	A	H
Result	L	W	D	L	D
Position	4	4	4	4	4

Source: See Results
A = Away; H = Home; W = Win; D = Draw; L = Loss

===== Results =====
3 May 2021 27	CSKA Sofia	1–0	Arda	Sofia
20:15 EEST (UTC+3)	Mattheij 88', (yellow card) 90+1'	Report	Yordanov (yellow card) 70'; Martinov (yellow card) 90+1'	Stadium: Balgarska Armia; Referee: Stanimir Trenchev

7 May 2021 28	Beroe	0–2	Arda	Stara Zagora
17:30 EEST (UTC+3)		Report	Kokonov (yellow card) 38'; Yordanov 40', 76' (pen.); Rumenov (yellow card) 81'	Stadium: Beroe; Referee: Georgi Kabakov

12 May 2021 29	Arda	0–0	CSKA 1948	Kardzhali
17:00 EEST (UTC+3)	Krumov (yellow card) 16'; Kotev (yellow card) 39'; Kokonov (red card) 64'	Report	Lichev (yellow card) 25'; Aleksandrov (yellow card) 57' (yellow-red card) 85'; Klimentov (yellow card) 72'; Lyaskov (yellow card) 84'	Stadium: Arena Arda; Referee: Stanislav Todorov

15 May 2021 30	Ludogorets Razgrad	4–1	Arda	Razgrad
17:30 EEST (UTC+3)	Yankov 38'; Taravel 45' (o.g.); Santana 57'; Cicinho (yellow card) 59'; Cauly 87'	Report	Yordanov 37'	Stadium: Huvepharma Arena; Referee: Ivo Andreev

26 May 2021 31	Arda	3–3	Lokomotiv Plovdiv	Sofia
20:00 EEST (UTC+3)	Delev 4', 44'; Petkov (yellow card) 35'; Kostadinov (yellow card) 48'; Yordanov 50'	Report	Kolev 14'; Iliev 65'; Ivanov 89'; Aramazov (yellow card) 90+3'	Stadium: Vasil Levski National Stadium; Referee: Georgi Davidov

==== UEFA Europa Conference League qualification ====
30 May 2021 Play-off	Arda	1–0	Cherno More	Kardzhali
19:00 EEST (UTC+3)	Kokonov 18'; Kotev (yellow card) 30'; Martinov (yellow card) 68'; Zhelev (yellow card) 68'; Yordanov (penalty missed) 79'; Petkov (yellow card) 85' (yellow-red card) 90+3'; Karadzhov (yellow card) 86'; Juninho (yellow card) 90+7'	Report	Panov (yellow card) 41' (yellow-red card) 74'; Panayotov (yellow card) 50'; Popov (yellow card) 60'; Rodrigo (yellow card) 64'; Dimov (yellow card) 88'; Drobarov (yellow card) 90+5'	Stadium: Arena Arda; Referee: Stanislav Todorov

=== Bulgarian Cup ===
4 November 2020 Round of 32	Spartak Varna	1–2	Arda	Varna
13:30 EET (UTC+2)	Mihaylov (yellow card) 68'; Ibryam (yellow card) 30'; Andreev 52', (yellow card) 61'; Smirnov (yellow card) 81'	Report	Knežević 21'; Lozev (yellow card) 70'; Delev 60'	Stadium: Stadion Spartak; Referee: Nikola Petrov

2 March 2021 Round of 16	Etar	0–1	Arda	Veliko Tarnovo
17:30 EET (UTC+2)	Córdoba (yellow card) 90+2'	Report	Tilev 33'; Kotev (yellow card) 67'; Georgiev (yellow card) 79'; Lozev (yellow card) 89'	Stadium: Ivaylo; Referee: Stanimir Trenchev

17 March 2021 Quarter-finals	CSKA 1948	0–1	Arda	Sofia
15:30 EET (UTC+2)	Lyaskov (yellow card) 44'	Report	Lozev (yellow card) 16'; Delev 55'	Stadium: Natsionalen stadion Vasil Levski; Referee: Valentin Zhelezov

6 April 2021 Semi-finals 1 leg	Arda	0–0	Slavia Sofia	Kardzhali
19:30 EEST (UTC+3)	Krumov (yellow card) 35'; Petkov (yellow card) 90+1'	Report	Valchev (yellow card) 69'; Makrillos (yellow card) 80'	Stadium: Arena Arda; Referee: Stanislav Todorov

13 April 2021 Semi-finals 2 leg	Slavia Sofia	0–1 (0–1 agg.)	Arda	Sofia
18:30 EEST (UTC+3)	Viyachki (yellow card) 83'	Report	Lozev (yellow card) 7'; Petkov 26'; Krumov (yellow card) 82'; Martinov (yellow card) 84'	Stadium: Slavia; Referee: Dragomir Draganov

19 May 2021 Final	Arda	0–1	CSKA Sofia	Sofia
19:30 EEST (UTC+3)	Martinov (yellow card) 62'; Tilev (yellow card) 82'; Petkov (yellow card) 89'	Report	Carey (yellow card) 27'; Mattheij (yellow card) 57'; Sinclair (yellow card) 60'; Charles 85'; Busatto (yellow card) 90'	Stadium: Natsionalen stadion Vasil Levski; Referee: Volen Chinkov

== Squad statistics ==
Including UEFA Europa Conference league qualification play-off

=== Appearances ===
Players with no appearances not included in the list.

No.	Pos.	Player	Bulgarian First League		Bulgarian Cup		Total	
No.	Pos.	Player	Apps	Starts	Apps	Starts	Apps	Starts
4	DF	(Bulgaria) Milen Stoev	24	20	2	2	26	22
5	DF	(Bulgaria) Petko Ganev	11	11	0	0	11	11
8	DF	(Bulgaria) Milen Zhelev	26	20	5	4	31	24
9	FW	(Bulgaria) Spas Delev	26	23	5	4	31	27
11	MF	(Bulgaria) Aleksandar Georgiev	20	18	0	0	20	18
12	GK	(Bulgaria) Ivan Karadzhov	22	22	5	5	27	27
13	DF	(France) Nicolas Taravel	8	8	1	1	9	9
17	MF	(Bulgaria) Ivan Kokonov	27	24	3	2	30	26
18	FW	(Bulgaria) Georgi Atanasov	9	3	2	0	11	3
19	MF	(Bulgaria) Rumen Rumenov	27	18	5	2	32	20
20	DF	(Bulgaria) Deyan Lozev	26	25	6	6	32	31
22	DF	(Greece) Manolis Roussakis	0	0	1	0	1	0
24	DF	(Bulgaria) Alex Petkov	11	10	4	4	15	14
25	DF	(Bulgaria) Radoslav Uzunov	2	0	0	0	2	0
27	MF	(Bulgaria) Emil Martinov	29	29	6	5	35	34
33	MF	(Bulgaria) Ivan Tilev	29	13	5	4	34	17
36	GK	(Bulgaria) Vasil Simeonov	10	10	1	1	11	11
37	FW	(Brazil) Juninho	11	2	3	0	14	2
71	DF	(Bulgaria) Plamen Krumov	17	15	5	5	22	20
77	DF	(Bulgaria) Martin Kostadinov	11	2	5	2	16	4
80	MF	(Bulgaria) Lachezar Kotev	25	21	6	6	31	27
98	FW	(Bulgaria) Tonislav Yordanov	16	13	5	5	21	18
Players who have left the club
7	MF	(Bulgaria) Mihail Aleksandrov	9	0	1	1	10	1
10	MF	(Bulgaria) Svetoslav Kovachev	15	14	1	1	16	15
14	FW	(Croatia) Andrija Bubnjar	3	0	1	0	4	0
15	MF	(France) Moussa Haddad	3	0	1	1	4	1
22	MF	(Croatia) Lovre Knežević	8	0	2	2	10	2
24	DF	(Iraq) Rebin Sulaka	12	11	0	0	12	11
25	DF	(Brazil) Matheus Leoni	15	15	0	0	15	15
99	FW	(Bulgaria) Radoslav Vasilev	4	3	0	0	4	3

Last updated: 29 May 2021.
Source: FBref.com

=== Goalscorers ===
Rank	No.	Pos.	Player	Bulgarian First League	Bulgarian Cup	Total
1	9	FW	(Bulgaria) Spas Delev	8	2	10
2	17	MF	(Bulgaria) Ivan Kokonov	9	0	9
3	98	FW	(Bulgaria) Tonislav Yordanov	8	0	8
4	37	FW	(Brazil) Juninho	4	0	4
5	10	MF	(Bulgaria) Svetoslav Kovachev	3	0	3
5	19	MF	(Bulgaria) Rumen Rumenov	3	0	3
5	33	MF	(Bulgaria) Ivan Tilev	2	1	3
8	8	DF	(Bulgaria) Milen Zhelev	2	0	2
9	22	MF	(Croatia) Lovre Knežević	0	1	1
9	24	DF	(Bulgaria) Alex Petkov	0	1	1
9	25	DF	(Brazil) Matheus Leoni	1	0	1
9	71	DF	(Bulgaria) Plamen Krumov	1	0	1
9	99	FW	(Bulgaria) Radoslav Vasilev	1	0	1
Own goals				1	0	1
Totals				43	5	48

Last updated: 29 May 2021.
Source: FBref.com

=== Top assists ===
Not all goals have an assist.

Rank	No.	Pos.	Player	Bulgarian First League	Bulgarian Cup	Total
1	9	FW	(Bulgaria) Spas Delev	7	0	7
2	20	DF	(Bulgaria) Deyan Lozev	5	0	5
3	33	MF	(Bulgaria) Ivan Tilev	4	1	5
4	11	DF	(Bulgaria) Aleksandar Georgiev	4	0	4
4	27	DF	(Bulgaria) Emil Martinov	4	0	4
6	10	MF	(Bulgaria) Svetoslav Kovachev	1	1	2
6	17	MF	(Bulgaria) Ivan Kokonov	2	0	2
6	80	DF	(Bulgaria) Lachezar Kotev	2	0	2
6	98	MF	(Bulgaria) Tonislav Yordanov	1	1	2
10	19	MF	(Bulgaria) Rumen Rumenov	1	0	1
10	15	MF	(France) Moussa Haddad	0	1	1
10	25	DF	(Brazil) Matheus Leoni	1	0	1
10	37	FW	(Brazil) Juninho	1	0	1
10	71	FW	(Bulgaria) Plamen Krumov	1	0	1
10	77	DF	(Bulgaria) Martin Kostadinov	1	0	1
10	99	FW	(Bulgaria) Radoslav Vasilev	1	0	1
Totals				36	4	40

Last updated: 29 May 2021.
Source: FBref.com

=== Clean sheets ===
Rank	No.	Pos.	Player	Bulgarian First League	Bulgarian Cup	Total
1	12	GK	(Bulgaria) Ivan Karadzhov	11	4	15
2	36	GK	(Bulgaria) Vasil Simeonov	2	0	2
Totals				13	4	17

Last updated: 29 May 2021.
Source: FBref.com

=== Disciplinary record ===
No.	Pos.	Player	Bulgarian First League			Bulgarian Cup			Total		
No.	Pos.	Player	Booked	(yellow card) (yellow-red card)	Sent off (straight red)	Booked	(yellow card) (yellow-red card)	Sent off (straight red)	Booked	(yellow card) (yellow-red card)	Sent off (straight red)
4	DF	(Bulgaria) Milen Stoev	2	0	0	0	0	0	2	0	0
5	DF	(Bulgaria) Petko Ganev	2	0	0	0	0	0	2	0	0
8	DF	(Bulgaria) Milen Zhelev	5	0	0	0	0	0	5	0	0
9	FW	(Bulgaria) Spas Delev	3	0	0	0	0	0	3	0	0
11	MF	(Bulgaria) Aleksandar Georgiev	3	1	0	1	0	0	4	1	0
12	GK	(Bulgaria) Ivan Karadzhov	4	0	0	1	0	0	5	0	0
13	DF	(France) Nicolas Taravel	4	0	0	0	0	0	4	0	0
14	DF	(Bulgaria) Stoycho Atanasov	0	0	0	0	0	0	0	0	0
17	MF	(Bulgaria) Ivan Kokonov	4	0	1	0	0	0	4	0	1
18	FW	(Bulgaria) Georgi Atanasov	0	0	0	0	0	0	0	0	0
19	MF	(Bulgaria) Rumen Rumenov	6	0	0	0	0	0	6	0	0
20	DF	(Bulgaria) Deyan Lozev	5	0	0	4	0	0	9	0	0
22	DF	(Greece) Manolis Roussakis	0	0	0	0	0	0	0	0	0
23	GK	(Bulgaria) Mesut Yusuf	0	0	0	0	0	0	0	0	0
24	DF	(Bulgaria) Alex Petkov	2	1	0	2	0	0	4	1	0
25	DF	(Bulgaria) Radoslav Uzunov	7	0	0	0	0	0	1	0	0
27	MF	(Bulgaria) Emil Martinov	9	0	0	2	0	0	11	0	0
30	MF	(Bulgaria) Okan Topcu	0	0	0	0	0	0	1	0	0
33	MF	(Bulgaria) Ivan Tilev	3	0	0	1	0	0	4	0	0
36	GK	(Bulgaria) Vasil Simeonov	1	0	0	0	0	0	1	0	0
37	FW	(Brazil) Juninho	1	0	0	0	0	0	1	0	0
71	DF	(Bulgaria) Plamen Krumov	2	1	0	2	0	0	4	1	0
77	DF	(Bulgaria) Martin Kostadinov	1	0	0	0	0	0	1	0	0
80	MF	(Bulgaria) Lachezar Kotev	8	0	0	1	0	0	9	0	0
98	FW	(Bulgaria) Tonislav Yordanov	2	0	0	0	0	0	2	0	0
Players who have left the club
7	MF	(Bulgaria) Mihail Aleksandrov	1	0	0	0	0	0	1	0	0
10	MF	(Bulgaria) Svetoslav Kovachev	3	0	0	0	0	0	3	0	0
14	FW	(Croatia) Andrija Bubnjar	0	0	0	0	0	0	0	0	0
15	MF	(France) Moussa Haddad	0	0	0	1	0	0	1	0	0
22	MF	(Croatia) Lovre Knežević	1	0	0	0	0	0	1	0	0
24	DF	(Iraq) Rebin Sulaka	3	0	0	0	0	0	3	0	0
25	DF	(Brazil) Matheus Leoni	2	0	0	0	0	0	2	0	0
99	FW	(Bulgaria) Radoslav Vasilev	0	0	0	0	0	0	0	0	0
Totals			84	3	1	14	0	0	98	3	1

Last updated: 29 May 2021.
Source: FBref.com

== Awards ==
- Football manager of 2020: Nikolay Kirov
