= 2021–22 FC Arda Kardzhali season =

Arda
2021–22 season
- Chairman: Petar Peshev
- Manager: Nikolay Kirov
- Stadium: Arena Arda
- First League: 6th
- Bulgarian Cup: Round Of 16
- UEFA Europa Conference League: Second qualifying round
Home colours	Away colours	Third colours

The 2021–22 season is Arda's third consecutive season in the Bulgarian First League. During this season the club will compete for the first time in the UEFA Europa Conference League.

This article shows player statistics and all matches (official and friendly) that the club played during the 2021–22 season.

== Squad ==
As of 14 August 2021

No.	Position	Player	Date of birth (age)	Since	Previous club	Apps.	Goals
Goalkeepers
12	GK	(Bulgaria) Ivan Karadzhov	12 July 1989 (aged 32)	2018	(Belarus) Shakhtyor Soligorsk	82	0
23	GK	(Bulgaria) Mesut Yusuf	14 January 1992 (aged 29)	2019		4	0
36	GK	(Bulgaria) Vasil Simeonov	4 February 1998 (aged 23)	2020	(Bulgaria) Montana	11	0
Defenders
4	DF	(Bulgaria) Milen Stoev	29 September 1999 (aged 21)	2018	(Bulgaria) Vihren Sandanski	40	0
5	DF	(Bulgaria) Petko Ganev	17 September 1996 (aged 24)	2020	(Bulgaria) Litex Lovech	11	0
8	DF	(Bulgaria) Milen Zhelev	17 July 1993 (aged 28)	2020	(Bulgaria) Beroe Stara Zagora	31	2
18	DF	(Serbia) Slobodan Rubežić	21 March 2000 (aged 21)	2021	(Serbia) Čukarički	0	0
20	DF	(Bulgaria) Deyan Lozev	26 October 1993 (aged 27)	2020	(Bulgaria) Levski Sofia	76	2
24	DF	(Bulgaria) Alex Petkov	25 July 1999 (aged 22)	2021	(Bulgaria) Levski Sofia	15	1
25	DF	(Bulgaria) Krum Stoyanov	1 August 1991 (aged 30)	2021	(Bulgaria) Beroe	0	0
71	DF	(Bulgaria) Plamen Krumov	4 November 1985 (aged 35)	2018	(Bulgaria) Lokomotiv Plovdiv	72	4
79	DF	(Bulgaria) Radoslav Uzunov	25 March 2006 (aged 15)	2021	Youth Team	2	0
Midfielders
11	MF	(Bulgaria) Aleksandar Georgiev	10 October 1997 (aged 23)	2019	(Bulgaria) Etar	45	1
19	MF	(Bulgaria) Rumen Rumenov	7 June 1993 (aged 28)	2020	(Bulgaria) Etar	40	3
27	MF	(Bulgaria) Emil Martinov	18 March 1992 (aged 29)	2019	(Azerbaijan) Sabail	66	0
29	MF	(Bulgaria) Georgi Atanasov	6 March 2004 (aged 17)	2021	(Bulgaria) Levski Sofia	13	0
30	MF	(Bulgaria) Okan Topcu	16 January 2004 (aged 17)	2021	Youth Team	0	0
33	MF	(Bulgaria) Ivan Tilev	4 March 1999 (aged 22)	2020	(Bulgaria) Septemvri Sofia	34	3
77	MF	(Bulgaria) Iliya Yurukov	22 September 1999 (aged 21)	2021	(Bulgaria) Levski Sofia	0	0
80	MF	(Bulgaria) Lachezar Kotev	5 January 1998 (aged 23)	2020	(Bulgaria) Vitosha Bistritsa	31	0
Forwards
9	FW	(Bulgaria) Spas Delev	22 September 1989 (aged 31)	2019	(Poland) Pogoń Szczecin	52	11
10	FW	(Bulgaria) Svetoslav Kovachev	14 March 1998 (aged 23)	2021	(Bulgaria) Ludogorets Razgrad	25	5
17	FW	(Bulgaria) Ivan Kokonov	17 August 1991 (aged 29)	2019	(Bulgaria) Cherno More	72	16
37	FW	(Brazil) Juninho	26 February 1999 (aged 22)	2020	(Brazil) Sport Recife	12	4
98	FW	(Bulgaria) Tonislav Yordanov	27 November 1998 (aged 22)	2021	(Bulgaria) CSKA Sofia	21	8
Players have left the club
13	DF	(France) Nicolas Taravel	13 October 1994 (aged 26)	2021	(United States) Oklahoma City Energy	9	0
14	DF	(Bulgaria) Stoycho Atanasov	14 May 1997 (aged 24)	2020	(Bulgaria) CSKA Sofia	4	0
22	DF	(Greece) Manolis Roussakis	15 February 1996 (aged 25)	2021	(Greece) Xanthi	1	0
77	DF	(Bulgaria) Martin Kostadinov	13 May 1996 (aged 25)	2020	(Bulgaria) Cherno More	18	0

== Transfers ==
=== In ===
Date	Position	Player	From	Fee	Source
15 June 2021	DF	(Bulgaria) Krum Stoyanov	(Bulgaria) Beroe	Free transfer	
15 June 2021	MF	(Bulgaria) Iliya Yurukov	(Bulgaria) Levski Sofia	Free transfer	
1 July 2021	FW	(Bulgaria) Svetoslav Kovachev	(Bulgaria) Ludogorets Razgrad	Free transfer	
26 July 2021	DF	(Serbia) Slobodan Rubežić	(Serbia) Čukarički	Free transfer	

=== Out ===
Date	Position	Player	To	Fee	Source
30 June 2021	DF	(France) Nicolas Taravel	Unattached	Released	
30 June 2021	DF	(Greece) Manolis Roussakis	(Greece) Xanthi	Loan return	
30 June 2021	FW	(Bulgaria) Petar Hristov	(Bulgaria) Levski Krumovgrad	Free transfer	
3 August 2021	DF	(Bulgaria) Stoycho Atanasov	(Bulgaria) Lokomotiv Sofia	Free transfer	

=== Loans out ===
Start date	End date	Position	Player	To	Fee	Source
1 July 2021	30 June 2022	DF	(Bulgaria) Martin Kostadinov	(Bulgaria) Botev Vratsa	Undisclosed	

== Friendlies ==
=== Pre-season ===
25 June 2021	Arda (Bulgaria)	2–1	(Bulgaria) Maritsa Plovdiv	Momchilgrad
11:00 EEST (UTC+3)	Yordanov 64' (pen.); Georgiev 78'	Report	Tonev 19'

30 June 2021	Cherno More (Bulgaria)	3–2	(Bulgaria) Arda	Bansko
17:00 EEST (UTC+3)	Ze Gomes 2'; Angelov 26'; Stoyanov 40' (o.g.)	Report	Delev 32'; Kokonov 65' (pen.)	Stadium: Terenite na Evima Futbol

3 July 2021	Arda (Bulgaria)	1–1	(Bulgaria) Strumska Slava	Bansko
11:00 EEST (UTC+3)	Kokonov 40'	Report	Paul 30'	Stadium: Terenite na Evima Futbol

7 July 2021	Arda (Bulgaria)	1–0	(Bulgaria) CSKA 1948	Bansko
18:30 EEST (UTC+3)	Delev 87'	Report		Stadium: Terenite na Evima Futbol

10 July 2021	Arda (Bulgaria)	0–1	(Bulgaria) Slaviа	Bansko
10:30 EEST (UTC+3)		Report	Makrillos 25'	Stadium: Terenite na Evima Futbol

15 July 2021	Arda (Bulgaria)	2–0	(Bulgaria) Beroe	Kardzhali
19:30 EEST (UTC+3)	Delev 50'; Yordanov 61' (pen.)	Report		Stadium: Arena Arda

=== Mid-season ===
1 August 2021	Arda (Bulgaria)	2–1	(Saudi Arabia) Al Nassr	Sofia
18:00 EEST (UTC+3)	Juninho 52'; Yordanov 58'	Report	Talisca 85' (pen.)	Stadium: Boyana National Football Complex

== Competitions ==
=== Overview ===
Competition	First match	Last match	Starting round	Record							
Competition	First match	Last match	Starting round	Pld	W	D	L	GF	GA	GD	Win %
Bulgarian First League	26 July 2021		Matchday 1	2	1	1	0	2	0	+2	50.00
Bulgarian Cup	21-23 September 2021		Round of 32	0	0	0	0	0	0	+0	—
UEFA Europa Conference League	22 July 2021	29 July 2021	Second qualifying round	2	0	0	2	0	6	−6	0.00
Total				4	1	1	2	2	6	−4	25.00

Last updated: 8 August 2021
Source: Soccerway

=== Bulgarian First league ===
==== Regular season ====
===== Table =====
Pos	Team	Pld	W	D	L	GF	GA	GD	Pts	Qualification
8	Beroe	26	9	5	12	23	27	−4	32	Qualification for the Europa Conference League group
9	CSKA 1948	26	8	6	12	36	37	−1	30	Qualification for the Europa Conference League group
10	Arda	26	7	8	11	27	34	−7	29	Qualification for the Europa Conference League group
11	Pirin Blagoevgrad	26	7	6	13	34	41	−7	27	Qualification for the Relegation group
12	Lokomotiv Sofia	26	6	7	13	22	42	−20	25	Qualification for the Relegation group

Source: soccerway, Bulgarian Football
Rules for classification: 1) Points; 2) Head-to-head points; 3) Head-to-head goal difference; 4) Head-to-head goals scored; 5) Head-to-head away goals scored (only if two teams); 6) Goal difference; 7) Goals scored; 8) Fairplay ranking; 9) Draw.

===== Results summary =====
Overall								Home						Away					
Pld	W	D	L	GF	GA	GD	Pts	W	D	L	GF	GA	GD	W	D	L	GF	GA	GD
32	8	11	13	38	51	−13	35	6	6	4	26	26	0	2	5	9	12	25	−13

Last updated: 20 May 2022.
Source: See Results

===== Results by round =====
Matchday	1	2	3	4	5	6	7	8	9	10	11	12	13	14	15	16	17	18	19	20	21	22	23	24	25	26	27	28	29	30	31	32
Ground	A	H	A	H	A	H	A	H	A	H	A	H	A	H	A	H	A	H	A	H	A	H	A	H	A	H	A	H	A	H	A	H
Result	D	D	W	L	L	D	L	W	D	L	D	D	W	W	L	D	L	W	L	L	L	W	L	W	L	D	D	L	D	D	L	W
Position	6	9	6	9	9	8	10	7	8	8	8	10	8	7	8	8	9	9	9	10	11	10	10	9	10	10	10	10	10	10	10	10

Source: See Results
A = Away; H = Home; W = Win; D = Draw; L = Loss

==== Matches ====
The league fixtures were revealed on 22 June 2021.

26 July 2021 1	Botev Vratsa	0–0	Arda	Vratsa
21:00 EEST (UTC+3)	Baurenski (yellow card) 67'; Nichev (yellow card) 90+1'	Report	Georgiev (yellow card) 38'; Lozev (yellow card) 44'; Rumenov (yellow card) 62'; Krumov (yellow card) 90+1'; Stoev (yellow card) 90+2'	Stadium: Hristo Botev; Referee: Georgi Ginchev

16 December 2021 2	Arda	2 – 2	CSKA Sofia	Kardzhali
16:30 EET (UTC+2)	Yurukov (yellow card) 16'; Yordanov 31' (pen.); Kiki (yellow card) 45'; Zehirov (yellow card) 46'; Kokonov 55'; Ivanov (yellow card) 71'; Tilev (yellow card) 80'; Zhelev (yellow card) 90+1'	Report	Geferson (yellow card) 18'; Mattheij (yellow card) 30'; Caicedo 45+1' 90+2'; Muhar (yellow card) 51'; Baï (yellow card) 55'; Bismark Charles (yellow card) 90+5'	Stadium: Arena Arda; Attendance: 1,100; Referee: (Bulgaria) Ivaylo Stoyanov
Note: Postponed on a request by both teams.

8 August 2021 3	Levski Sofia	0–2	Arda	Sofia
21:00 EEST (UTC+3)	Bari (yellow card) 64'	Report	Yordanov 20' (pen.); Karadzhov (yellow card) 28'; Delev 32'; Juninho (yellow card) 64'	Stadium: Vivacom Arena - Georgi Asparuhov; Referee: Valentin Zhelezov

20 August 2021 5	Tsarsko Selo	1–0	Arda	Sofia
18:45 EEST (UTC+3)	Aleksandrov (yellow card) 41'; Shopov 50'; Kolev (yellow card) 88'; Georgiev (yellow card) 90+2'	Report	Martinov (yellow card) 64'; Stoev (yellow card) 64'	Stadium: Arena Tsarsko Selo; Referee: Stanislav Todorov

27 August 2021 6	Arda	1 – 1	Lokomotiv Sofia	Kardzhali
21:00 EET (UTC+2)	Kotev (yellow card) 43'; Katsikas 52' (o.g.); Delev (yellow card) 62'; Rumenov (yellow card) 88'	Report	Katsarov (yellow card) 24'; Octávio (yellow card) 45+1' (goal) 80'; Aleksandrov (yellow card) 54'; Krachunov (yellow card) 86'	Stadium: Arena Arda; Attendance: 700; Referee: (Bulgaria) Stanimir Trenchev

13 September 2021 7	Botev Plovdiv	2 – 1	Arda	Plovdiv
20:30 EET (UTC+2)	Marquinhos 8' 36' (yellow card) 90+3'; Rabeï (red card) 60'	Report	Krumov (yellow card) 39' (yellow-red card) 90+2'; Yordanov 54'; Yurukov (yellow card) 62'; Petkov (yellow card) 87'	Stadium: Futbolen kompleks Botev 1912; Attendance: 1,500; Referee: (Bulgaria) Dragomir Draganov

17 September 2021 8	Arda	3 – 0	Pirin	Kardzhali
18:15 EET (UTC+2)	Kotev 18'; Georgiev (yellow card) 20'; Kokonov 40'; Yordanov 59' (pen.)	Report	Nikolov (yellow card) 27'; Sheytanov (yellow card) 57'; Dyakov (yellow card) 81'	Stadium: Arena Arda; Attendance: 700; Referee: (Bulgaria) Georgi Kabakov

24 September 2021 9	Beroe	1 – 1	Arda	Stara Zagora
20:00 EET (UTC+2)	Camara 32' (pen.); Vasilev (yellow card) 59'; Sako (yellow card) 62'	Report	Karadzhov (yellow card) 29'; Juninho 79'	Stadium: Beroe; Attendance: 1,000; Referee: (Bulgaria) Ivo Andreev

2 October 2021 10	Arda	0 – 3	Cherno More	Kardzhali
20:00 EET (UTC+2)	Yurukov (yellow card) 14'; Juninho (yellow card) 28'	Report	Jeka 29'; Drobarov 31'; Velev 50'; Pablo Álvarez (yellow card) 68'; Panayotov (yellow card) 82'; Dyulgerov (yellow card) 87'	Stadium: Arena Arda; Attendance: 450; Referee: (Bulgaria) Stanislav Todorov

15 October 2021 11	Lokomotiv Plovdiv	0 – 0	Arda	Plovdiv
20:15 EET (UTC+2)	Vitanov (yellow card) 32'; Bykov (yellow card) 53'; Karagaren (yellow card) 65'; Petrović (yellow card) 90+4'	Report	Petkov (yellow card) 45'; Zehirov (yellow card) 58'; Delev (yellow card) 90'; Stoev (yellow card) 90+4'	Stadium: Lokomotiv; Attendance: 250; Referee: (Bulgaria) Ivelin Zanev

23 October 2021 12	Arda	1 – 1	Slavia Sofia	Kardzhali
16:30 EET (UTC+2)	Zhelev 71'	Report	Martin Sorakov 16'; Viyachki (yellow card) 70'; Stoev (yellow card) 90+4'	Stadium: Arena Arda; Attendance: 450; Referee: (Bulgaria) Valentin Zhelezov

1 November 2021 13	CSKA 1948	2 – 3	Arda	Sofia
18:00 EET (UTC+2)	Klimentov (yellow card) 20'; Chochev 57'; Lozev (yellow card) 73'; Petrov 76'	Report	Marin 32' (o.g.); Juninho (yellow card) 35'; Petkov 37'; Kotev (yellow card) 61'; Delev 86'	Stadium: Natsionalen stadion Vasil Levski; Attendance: 20; Referee: (Bulgaria) Georgi Kabakov

7 November 2021 14	Arda	3 – 2	Botev Vratsa	Kardzhali
15:30 EET (UTC+2)	Delev 33' (yellow card) 56'; Rumenov 46'; Petkov (yellow card) 48' (yellow-red card) 71'; Zehirov (yellow card) 78'; Yordanov 90+3'; Yurukov (yellow card) 90+4'	Report	Dobunski 51' (pen.) 54'; Ferraresso (yellow card) 59'; Matheus Cassini (yellow card) 62'; Yoan Baurenski (yellow card) 79'; Mitrev (yellow card) 90'	Stadium: Arena Arda; Attendance: 600; Referee: (Bulgaria) Radoslav Gidzhenov

20 November 2021 15	CSKA Sofia	2 – 1	Arda	Sofia
17:45 EET (UTC+2)	Geferson (yellow card) 40'; Caicedo 54'; Mattheij (yellow card) 56'; Mazikou (yellow card) 57' (goal) 79'; Busatto (yellow card) 90'; Mets (yellow card) 90+3'	Report	Zhelev 2'; Karadzhov (yellow card) 68'; Krumov (yellow card) 75'; Yurukov (yellow card) 90+4'	Stadium: Balgarska Armia; Attendance: No Spectators; Referee: (Bulgaria) Nikola Popov

27 November 2021 16	Arda	0 – 0	Levski Sofia	Kardzhali
17:30 EET (UTC+2)	Kotev (yellow card) 2'; Kiki (yellow card) 19'; Juninho (yellow card) 33'; Kovachev (yellow card) 82'	Report	Córdoba (yellow card) 8'	Stadium: Arena Arda; Attendance: 1,200; Referee: (Bulgaria) Stanimir Trenchev

2 December 2021 17	Ludogorets	4 – 1	Arda	Razgrad
15:00 EET (UTC+2)	Ikoko 7'; Sotiriou 29' 41'; Plastun (yellow card) 33'; Despodov 59'; Badji (yellow card) 76'	Report	Delev 36'; Petkov (yellow card) 58'	Stadium: Huvepharma Arena; Attendance: 550; Referee: (Bulgaria) Vladimir Valkov

6 December 2021 18	Arda	2 – 0	Tsarsko Selo	Kardzhali
16:45 EET (UTC+2)	Delev 21'; Petkov (yellow card) 25'; Kokonov 45+2' (pen.); Zhelev (yellow card) 85'; Slobodan Rubežić (yellow card) 89'	Report	Aleksandar Aleksandrov (yellow card) 45'	Stadium: Arena Arda; Attendance: 400; Referee: (Bulgaria) Radoslav Gidzhenov

11 December 2021 19	Lokomotiv Sofia	2 – 0	Arda	Sofia
12:00 EET (UTC+2)	Matheus Duarte 16'; Celso Raposo 33' (yellow card) 38'; Atanasov (yellow card) 90+1'	Report	Slobodan Rubežić (yellow card) 44'; Stoev (yellow card) 56'; Ivanov (yellow card) 67'	Stadium: Lokomotiv; Attendance: 200; Referee: (Bulgaria) Georgi Dimitrov

13 February 2022 4	Arda	0 – 4	Ludogorets	Kardzhali
14:15 EET (UTC+2)	Ivanov (yellow card) 25'	Report	Sotiriou 7' (yellow card) 42'; Cauly 12'; Alex Santana 23'; Show 39'; Pinas (yellow card) 68'	Stadium: Arena Arda; Attendance: 1,800; Referee: (Bulgaria) Radoslav Gidzhenov

18 February 2022 20	Arda	0 – 2	Botev Plovdiv	Kardzhali
17:30 EET (UTC+2)	Yordanov (yellow card) 53'	Report	Brahimi (yellow card) 22'; Konate (yellow card) 53'; Baroan 75'; Tonev (yellow card) 76'; Stoev 90+4' (o.g.)	Stadium: Arena Arda; Attendance: 1,100; Referee: (Bulgaria) Dimo Dimov

28 February 2022 21	Pirin	1 – 0	Arda	Blagoevgrad
17:30 EET (UTC+2)	Karachanakov 5'; Manolev (red card) 70'; Georgiev (yellow card) 73'; Georgiev (yellow card) 90+3'	Report	Kovachev (yellow card) 41'; Zhelev (yellow card) 57'	Stadium: Hristo Botev; Attendance: 1,000; Referee: (Bulgaria) Nikola Popov

TBD 22	Arda	v	Beroe	Kardzhali
				Stadium: Arena Arda

TBD 23	Cherno More	v	Arda	Varna
				Stadium: Ticha

TBD 24	Arda	v	Lokomotiv Plovdiv	Kardzhali
				Stadium: Arena Arda

TBD 25	Slavia Sofia	v	Arda	Sofia
				Stadium: Slavia

TBD 26	Arda	v	CSKA 1948	Kardzhali
				Stadium: Arena Arda

=== Bulgarian Cup ===
21 September 2021 Round of 32	Yambol 1915	0 - 3	Arda	Yambol
16:00 EET		Report	Kokonov 25' (pen.); Delev 47'; Ivanov (yellow card) 63'; Stoev (yellow card) 67'; Yordanov 80'	Stadium: Luskov Stadium; Referee: (Bulgaria) Kristiyan Kolev

28 October 2021 Round of 16	CSKA Sofia	2 - 0	Arda	Sofia
19:00 EET	Caicedo 22' 36'; Mazikou (red card) 54'	Report	Kotev (yellow card) 24'; Delev (yellow card) 63'; Petkov (yellow card) 73'	Stadium: Stadion Balgarska Armia; Referee: (Bulgaria) Stanimir Trenchev

=== UEFA Europa Conference League ===
Arda entered the competition in the second qualifying round following their win in the 2020–21 First Professional Football League Europa Conference League play-off.

==== Second qualifying round ====
22 July 2021 First leg	Arda (Bulgaria)	0–2	(Israel) Hapoel Be'er Sheva	Kardzhali
21:00 EEST (UTC+3)	Stoev (yellow card) 28'; Stoyanov (yellow card) 30'; Delev (yellow card) 80'; Juninho (yellow card) 80'	Report	Bareiro 52'; Gordana (yellow card) 28'; Keltjens (yellow card) 28'; Yehezkel (yellow card) 76'; Micha 78'; Harush (yellow card) 80'; Vitor (yellow card) 88'; Bareiro (yellow card) 88'; Hatuel (yellow card) 89'	Stadium: Arena Arda; Attendance: 4,460; Referee: Visar Kastrati (Kosovo)

29 July 2021 Second leg	Hapoel Be'er Sheva (Israel)	4–0	(Bulgaria) Arda	Petah Tikva
20:00 EEST (UTC+3)	Acolatse 5'; Safuri 31' (pen.); Ansah 71'; Hatuel 84'	Report	Martinov (yellow card) 24'; Krumov (yellow card) 45+2'	Stadium: Itztadion HaMoshava; Referee: Daniele Doveri (Italy)

== Squad statistics ==
=== Appearances ===
Players with no appearances not included in the list.

No.	Pos.	Player	Bulgarian First League		Bulgarian Cup		UEFA Europa Conference League		Total	
No.	Pos.	Player	Apps	Starts	Apps	Starts	Apps	Starts	Apps	Starts
4	DF	(Bulgaria) Milen Stoev	3	3	0	0	2	2	5	5
8	DF	(Bulgaria) Milen Zhelev	2	2	0	0	2	2	4	4
9	FW	(Bulgaria) Spas Delev	3	3	0	0	2	2	5	5
10	FW	(Bulgaria) Svetoslav Kovachev	1	0	0	0	2	1	3	1
11	MF	(Bulgaria) Aleksandar Georgiev	2	2	0	0	2	1	4	3
12	GK	(Bulgaria) Ivan Karadzhov	2	2	0	0	2	2	4	4
17	MF	(Bulgaria) Ivan Kokonov	3	3	0	0	2	2	5	5
19	MF	(Bulgaria) Rumen Rumenov	3	2	0	0	1	0	4	2
20	DF	(Bulgaria) Deyan Lozev	3	3	0	0	2	2	5	5
25	DF	(Bulgaria) Krum Stoyanov	1	0	0	0	1	1	2	1
27	MF	(Bulgaria) Emil Martinov	3	3	0	0	2	2	5	5
36	GK	(Bulgaria) Vasil Simeonov	1	1	0	0	0	0	1	1
33	MF	(Bulgaria) Ivan Tilev	3	1	0	0	2	0	5	1
37	FW	(Brazil) Juninho	3	1	0	0	2	0	5	1
71	DF	(Bulgaria) Plamen Krumov	3	3	0	0	2	2	5	5
77	DF	(Bulgaria) Iliya Yurukov	2	0	0	0	0	0	2	0
80	MF	(Bulgaria) Lachezar Kotev	1	1	0	0	2	2	3	3
98	FW	(Bulgaria) Tonislav Yordanov	3	3	0	0	2	1	5	4

Last updated: 20 August 2021.
Source: FBref.com

=== Goalscorers ===
Rank	No.	Pos.	Player	Bulgarian First League	Bulgarian Cup	UEFA Europe Conference Cup	Total
1	9	FW	(Bulgaria) Spas Delev	1	0	0	1
1	98	FW	(Bulgaria) Tonislav Yordanov	1	0	0	1
Own goals				0	0	0	0
Totals				2	0	0	2

Last updated: 8 August 2021.
Source: FBref.com

=== Top assists ===
Not all goals have an assist.

Rank	No.	Pos.	Player	Bulgarian First League	Bulgarian Cup	UEFA Europe Conference Cup	Total
1	37	FW	(Brazil) Juninho	1	0	0	1
Totals				1	0	0	1

Last updated: 8 August 2021.
Source: FBref.com

=== Clean sheets ===
Rank	No.	Pos.	Player	Bulgarian First League	Bulgarian Cup	UEFA Europe Conference Cup	Total
1	12	GK	(Bulgaria) Ivan Karadzhov	1	0	0	1
1	36	GK	(Bulgaria) Vasil Simeonov	1	0	0	1
Totals				2	0	0	2

Last updated: 8 August 2021.
Source: FBref.com

=== Disciplinary record ===
No.	Pos.	Player	Bulgarian First League			Bulgarian Cup			UEFA Europe Conference Cup			Total		
No.	Pos.	Player	Yellow card	(yellow card) (yellow-red card)	Red card	Yellow card	(yellow card) (yellow-red card)	Red card	Yellow card	(yellow card) (yellow-red card)	Red card	Yellow card	(yellow card) (yellow-red card)	Red card
4	DF	(Bulgaria) Milen Stoev	2	0	0	0	0	0	1	0	0	3	0	0
5	DF	(Bulgaria) Petko Ganev	0	0	0	0	0	0	0	0	0	0	0	0
8	DF	(Bulgaria) Milen Zhelev	0	0	0	0	0	0	0	0	0	0	0	0
9	FW	(Bulgaria) Spas Delev	0	0	0	0	0	0	1	0	0	1	0	0
10	FW	(Bulgaria) Svetoslav Kovachev	0	0	0	0	0	0	0	0	0	0	0	0
11	MF	(Bulgaria) Aleksandar Georgiev	1	0	0	0	0	0	0	0	0	1	0	0
12	GK	(Bulgaria) Ivan Karadzhov	1	0	0	0	0	0	0	0	0	1	0	0
17	MF	(Bulgaria) Ivan Kokonov	0	0	0	0	0	0	0	0	0	0	0	0
18	DF	(Serbia) Slobodan Rubežić	0	0	0	0	0	0	0	0	0	0	0	0
19	MF	(Bulgaria) Rumen Rumenov	1	0	0	0	0	0	0	0	0	1	0	0
20	DF	(Bulgaria) Deyan Lozev	1	0	0	0	0	0	0	0	0	1	0	0
23	GK	(Bulgaria) Mesut Yusuf	0	0	0	0	0	0	0	0	0	0	0	0
24	DF	(Bulgaria) Alex Petkov	0	0	0	0	0	0	0	0	0	0	0	0
25	DF	(Bulgaria) Krum Stoyanov	0	0	0	0	0	0	1	0	0	1	0	0
27	MF	(Bulgaria) Emil Martinov	1	0	0	0	0	0	1	0	0	2	0	0
29	FW	(Bulgaria) Georgi Atanasov	0	0	0	0	0	0	0	0	0	0	0	0
30	MF	(Bulgaria) Okan Topcu	0	0	0	0	0	0	0	0	0	0	0	0
33	MF	(Bulgaria) Ivan Tilev	0	0	0	0	0	0	0	0	0	0	0	0
36	GK	(Bulgaria) Vasil Simeonov	0	0	0	0	0	0	0	0	0	0	0	0
37	FW	(Brazil) Juninho	1	0	0	0	0	0	1	0	0	2	0	0
71	DF	(Bulgaria) Plamen Krumov	1	0	0	0	0	0	1	0	0	2	0	0
77	MF	(Bulgaria) Iliya Yurukov	0	0	0	0	0	0	0	0	0	0	0	0
79	DF	(Bulgaria) Radoslav Uzunov	0	0	0	0	0	0	0	0	0	0	0	0
80	MF	(Bulgaria) Lachezar Kotev	0	0	0	0	0	0	0	0	0	0	0	0
98	FW	(Bulgaria) Tonislav Yordanov	0	0	0	0	0	0	0	0	0	0	0	0
Totals			9	0	0	0	0	0	6	0	0	15	0	0

Last updated: 20 August 2021.
Source: FBref.com
