= 2021 Bulgarian Cup final =

Финал за Купата на България 2021
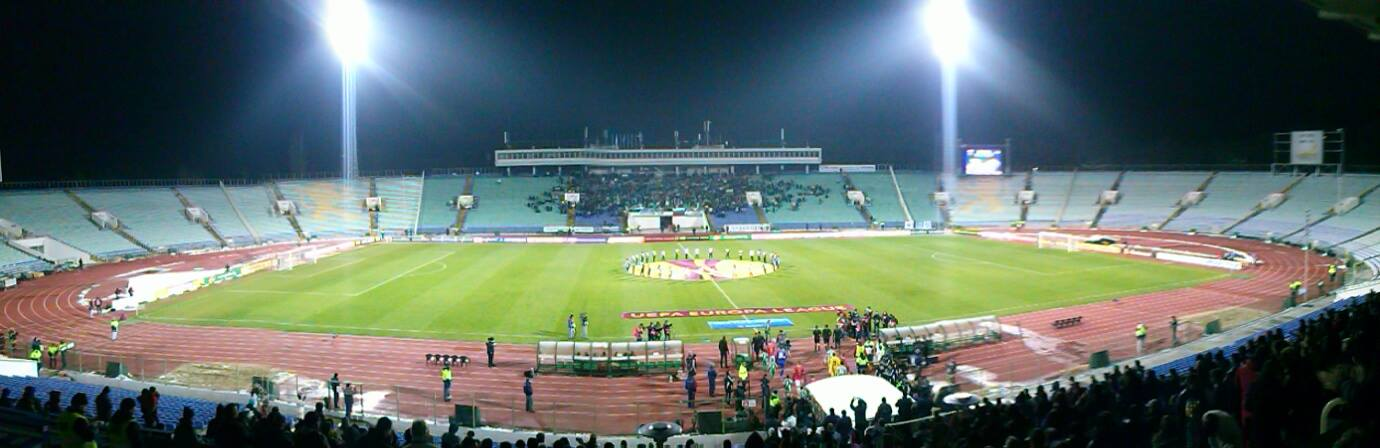
- Event: 2020–21 Bulgarian Cup
Arda	CSKA Sofia
0	1
- Date: 19 May 2021
- Venue: Vasil Levski, Sofia
- Referee: Volen Chinkov (Sofia)
- Attendance: 22,000
- Weather: Clear; 24 °C (75 °F)

The 2021 Bulgarian Cup final was the final match of the 2020–21 Bulgarian Cup and the 81st final of the Bulgarian Cup. The final took place on 19 May 2021 at Vasil Levski National Stadium in Sofia.

The clubs contesting the final were Arda Kardzhali and CSKA Sofia. For the symbolic hosts, this was their historic first cup final, while for CSKA, it was the 2nd consecutive and 34th overall. This was the 3rd time both teams faced each other in the tournament's history.

CSKA Sofia won the final by the score of 1–0 and lifted their 21st cup title, ending a 5-year drought after their last triumph in 2016. It also sealed their place in the second qualifying round of 2021–22 UEFA Europa Conference League.

== Route to the final ==
Arda			Round	CSKA Sofia
Opponent	Result	Legs		Opponent	Result	Legs
Spartak Varna	2–1	away	First round	Botev Ihtiman	5–0	away
Etar Veliko Tarnovo	1–0	away	Second round	Cherno More Varna	3–1	home
CSKA 1948 Sofia	1–0	away	Quarter-finals	Botev Vratsa	4–0	home
Slavia Sofia	1–0 (agg.)	0–0 home; 1–0 away	Semi-finals	Ludogorets Razgrad	3–2 (agg.)	1–1 home; 2–1 away

== Match ==
=== Details ===
19 May 2021
19:30 EEST

Arda	0–1	CSKA Sofia
	Report	Charles 85'

Vasil Levski National Stadium, Sofia
Attendance: 22,000
Referee: Volen Chinkov (Sofia)

Arda	CSKA

GK	12	(Bulgaria) Ivan Karadzhov
RB	20	(Bulgaria) Deyan Lozev
CB	24	(Bulgaria) Alex Petkov	(yellow card) 89'
CB	71	(Bulgaria) Plamen Krumov (c)
LB	8	(Bulgaria) Milen Zhelev
DM	27	(Bulgaria) Emil Martinov	(yellow card) 62'
DM	80	(Bulgaria) Lachezar Kotev
RW	17	(Bulgaria) Ivan Kokonov
AM	33	(Bulgaria) Ivan Tilev	(yellow card) 82'
LW	9	(Bulgaria) Spas Delev		(substituted off) 73'
CF	98	(Bulgaria) Tonislav Yordanov		(substituted off) 83'
Substitutes:
GK	36	(Bulgaria) Vasil Simeonov
DF	4	(Bulgaria) Milen Stoev
DF	77	(Bulgaria) Martin Kostadinov
MF	11	(Bulgaria) Aleksandar Georgiev
MF	19	(Bulgaria) Rumen Rumenov		(substituted on) 73'
FW	18	(Bulgaria) Georgi Atanasov
FW	37	(Brazil) Juninho		(substituted on) 83'
Manager:
(Bulgaria) Nikolay Kirov

GK	1	(Brazil) Gustavo Busatto	(yellow card) 90'
RB	19	(Bulgaria) Ivan Turitsov
CB	2	(Netherlands) Jurgen Mattheij	(yellow card) 57'
CB	4	(Netherlands) Menno Koch
LB	18	(France) Bradley Mazikou
DM	21	(Central African Republic) Amos Youga
RM	8	(Republic of Ireland) Graham Carey	(yellow card) 27'	(substituted off) 72'
CM	20	(Portugal) Tiago Rodrigues (c)
CM	5	(Argentina) Federico Varela		(substituted off) 46'
LM	24	(England) Jerome Sinclair	(yellow card) 60'	(substituted off) 61'
CF	30	(Ecuador) Jordy Caicedo		(substituted off) 61'
Substitutes:
GK	25	(Bulgaria) Dimitar Evtimov
DF	11	(Bulgaria) Petar Zanev
DF	15	(France) Thibaut Vion		(substituted on) 46'
MF	7	(Brazil) Henrique		(substituted on) 72'
MF	27	(Bulgaria) Martin Smolenski
FW	10	(Bulgaria) Georgi Yomov		(substituted on) 61'
FW	17	(Ghana) Bismark Charles	85'	(substituted on) 61'
Manager:
(Bulgaria) Lyuboslav Penev

Assistant referees:
Deniz Sokolov (Sofia)
Dimitar Dobromirov (Sofia)
Fourth official:
Nikola Popov (Sofia)
Video assistant referee:
Ivaylo Stoyanov (Petrich)
Assistant video assistant referee:
Ivo Kolev (Sofia)

Match rules

- 90 minutes.
- 30 minutes of extra time if necessary.
- Penalty shoot-out if scores still level.
- Seven named substitutes.
- Maximum of five substitutions, with a sixth allowed in extra time.
