= Hristo Ivanov =

Hristo Ivanov may refer to:

- Hristo Ivanov (politician), leader of Yes, Bulgaria!
- Hristo Ivanov (footballer, born 1982), Bulgarian footballer
- Hristo Ivanov (footballer, born 2000), Bulgarian footballer
