= Edimar =

Edimar is a given name. It may refer to:

- Edimar (footballer, born 1986), Edimar Curitiba Fraga, Brazilian football left-back
- Juninho (footballer, born 1999), Edimar Ribeiro da Costa Junior, Brazilian football forward
