= Lovre Knežević =

Croatian footballer

Personal information
- Date of birth: 22 July 1998 (age 28)
- Place of birth: Zadar, Croatia
- Height: 1.86 m (6 ft 1 in)
- Position: Midfielder

Youth career
- -2013: Zadar
- 2013-2016: Lokomotiva

Senior career*
Years	Team	Apps	(Gls)
2016	Lučko	6	(1)
2017	Hrvatski Dragovoljac	0	(0)
2017–2018	Kufstein	22	(3)
2019	Zadar	10	(1)
2019–2020	Beltinci	14	(5)
2020	Arda	8	(0)
2021–2022	Etar	50	(15)
2022–2023	Istra 1961	2	(0)
2023–2024	Etar	20	(0)
- * Club domestic league appearances and goals as of 22:41, 13 June 2024 (UTC)

Lovre Knežević (born 22 July 1998) is a Croatian professional footballer who plays as a midfielder.

== Club career ==
He has played for Lučko, Hrvatski Dragovoljac and Zadar in the Croatian Second League, for Kufstein in Austria, for Beltinci in Slovenia and for Arda and Etar Veliko Tarnovo in Bulgaria.

On 8 July 2022 he joined Istra 1961.
