= Iliya Yurukov =

Bulgarian footballer (born 1999)

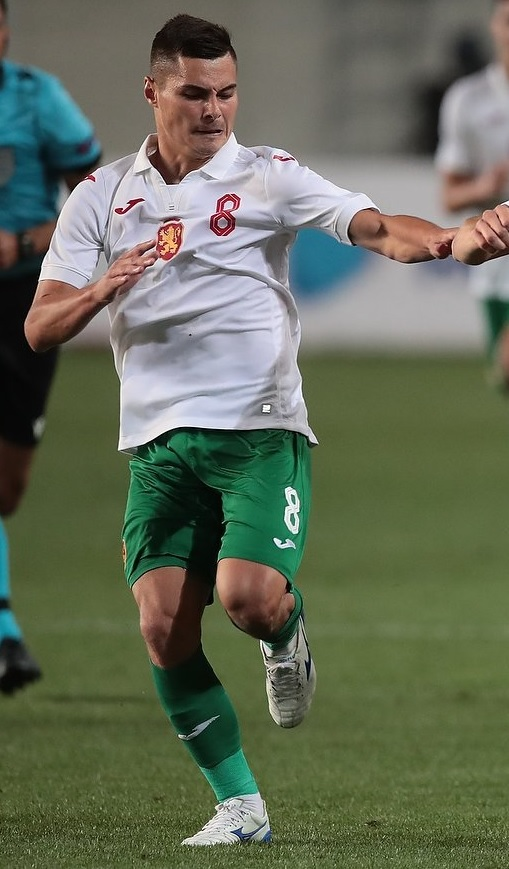
- Yurukov with Bulgaria U21 in 2020

Personal information
- Full name: Iliya Yordanov Yurukov
- Date of birth: 22 September 1999 (age 27)
- Place of birth: Plovdiv, Bulgaria
- Height: 1.77 m (5 ft 9 1/2 in)
- Position: Midfielder

Team information
- Current team: Botev Vratsa
- Number: 12

Youth career
- 2010–2016: Ludogorets Razgrad
- 2016–2018: Levski Sofia

Senior career*
Years	Team	Apps	(Gls)
2017–2021	Levski Sofia	48	(0)
2021–2024	Arda Kardzhali	86	(1)
2024–2025	Radnički Niš	26	(2)
2025–	Botev Vratsa	29	(0)

International career^{‡}
2014–2016	Bulgaria U17		
2016	Bulgaria U18	1	(0)
2017–2018	Bulgaria U19	4	(0)
2019–2020	Bulgaria U21	11	(1)
- * Club domestic league appearances and goals as of 11 June 2026 ‡ National team caps and goals as of 14 October 2020

Iliya Yordanov Yurukov (Bulgarian: Илия Йорданов Юруков; born 22 September 1999) is a Bulgarian professional footballer who plays as a midfielder for Botev Vratsa.

== Career ==
On 7 May 2017, Yurukov made his senior debut for Levski, replacing Tunde Adeniji in the 83rd minute as Levski won 1–0 away against Cherno More in the First League. In June 2021, Yurukov joined Arda Kardzhali.

== Career statistics ==
=== Club ===
As of 14 May 2023

Club performance			League		Cup		Continental		Other		Total	
Club	League	Season	Apps	Goals	Apps	Goals	Apps	Goals	Apps	Goals	Apps	Goals
Bulgaria			League		Bulgarian Cup		Europe		Other (Note: Includes Bulgarian Supercup matches.)		Total	
Levski Sofia	First League	2016–17	2	0	0	0	0	0	–		2	0
Levski Sofia	First League	2017–18	3	0	0	0	0	0	–		3	0
Levski Sofia	First League	2018–19	15	0	0	0	0	0	1 (Note: Europa League play-off)	0	15	0
Levski Sofia	First League	2019–20	9	0	2	0	4	0	4 (Note: Europa League play-off)	0	19	0
Levski Sofia	First League	2020–21	19	0	2	0	–		–		21	0
Levski Sofia	Total		48	0	4	0	4	0	5	0	61	0
Arda Kardzhali	First League	2021–22	26	0	2	0	0	0	–		28	0
Arda Kardzhali	First League	2022–23	28	1	3	0	–		–		31	1
Arda Kardzhali	Total		54	1	5	0	0	0	0	0	59	1
Career statistics			102	1	9	0	4	0	5	0	110	1
