= Atanas Krastev =

Bulgarian footballer

Personal information
- Full name: Atanas Nikolaev Krastev
- Date of birth: 1 February 1993 (age 33)
- Place of birth: Haskovo, Bulgaria
- Height: 1.76 m (5 ft 9 in)
- Position: Left back

Senior career*
Years	Team	Apps	(Gls)
2012–2015	Haskovo	62	(0)
2015	Botev Galabovo	4	(0)
2016–2017	Svilengrad	–	(–)
2017–2020	Arda Kardzhali	63	(0)
2020–2021	Sportist Svoge	0	(0)
2021–2022	Etar Veliko Tarnovo	23	(0)
- * Club domestic league appearances and goals as of 13 June 2022

Atanas Krastev (Bulgarian: Атанас Кръстев; born 1 February 1993) is a Bulgarian footballer who plays as a defender.

== Career ==
On 21 June 2017 he joined Third League club Arda Kardzhali.
