= Hristo Ivanov (footballer, born 2000) =

Bulgarian footballer (born 2000)

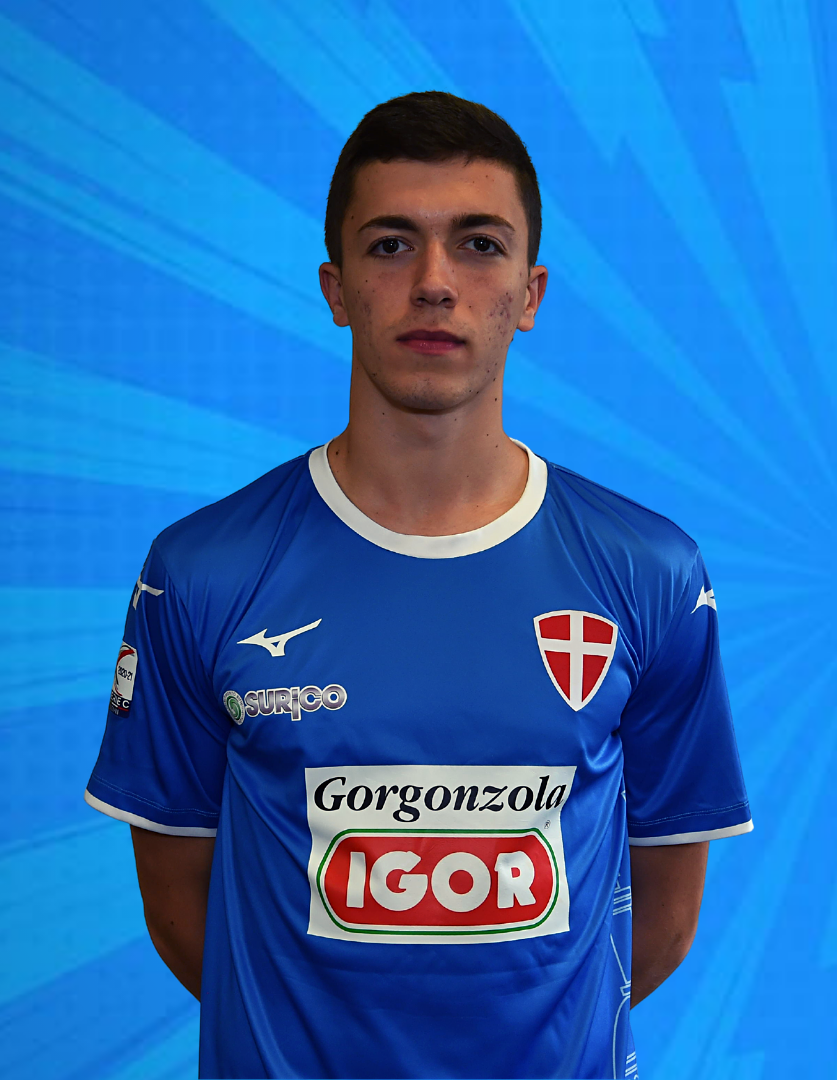
- Ivanov with Novara in 2020

Personal information
- Full name: Hristo Yankov Ivanov
- Date of birth: 16 December 2000 (age 25)
- Place of birth: Yambol, Bulgaria
- Height: 1.86 m (6 ft 1 in)
- Position: Midfielder

Team information
- Current team: Lechia Gdańsk
- Number: 6

Youth career
- Barnet
- Leyton Orient
- –2016: Tottenham Hotspur
- 2016–2019: Cherno More

Senior career*
Years	Team	Apps	(Gls)
2018–2019	Cherno More	0	(0)
2019–2020	Vitosha Bistritsa	17	(1)
2020–2021	Novara	2	(0)
2021–2023	Arda Kardzhali	35	(1)
2023–2025	Lokomotiv Plovdiv	83	(2)
2025–2026	Železničar Pančevo	13	(0)
2026	Vizela	8	(0)
2026–	Lechia Gdańsk	0	(0)

International career
2022	Bulgaria U21	2	(0)
2023	Bulgaria	2	(0)
- * Club domestic league appearances and goals as of 19 June 2026

Hristo Yankov Ivanov (Bulgarian: Христо Янков Иванов; born 16 December 2000) is a Bulgarian professional footballer who plays as a midfielder for I liga club Lechia Gdańsk.

He previously played for Cherno More, Vitosha Bistritsa, Arda Kardzhali and Novara.

== Career ==
Ivanov played for several English youth teams. Upon his return to Bulgaria, he became champion of Bulgaria for under 19 with Cherno More. The same year he made his debut in the first division with the team of Vitosha Bistritsa. In January 2023, he joined Lokomotiv Plovdiv.

On 19 January 2026, Ivanov joined Liga Portugal 2 club Vizela, signing a contract until June 2030.

On 26 August 2026, Ivanov joined Polish I liga side Lechia Gdańsk on a three-year deal.

== International career ==
He received his first call-up for Bulgaria on 5 October 2023 for the matches against Lithuania and Albania, after the injury of Dimo Krastev.
