= Stoycho Atanasov =

Bulgarian footballer

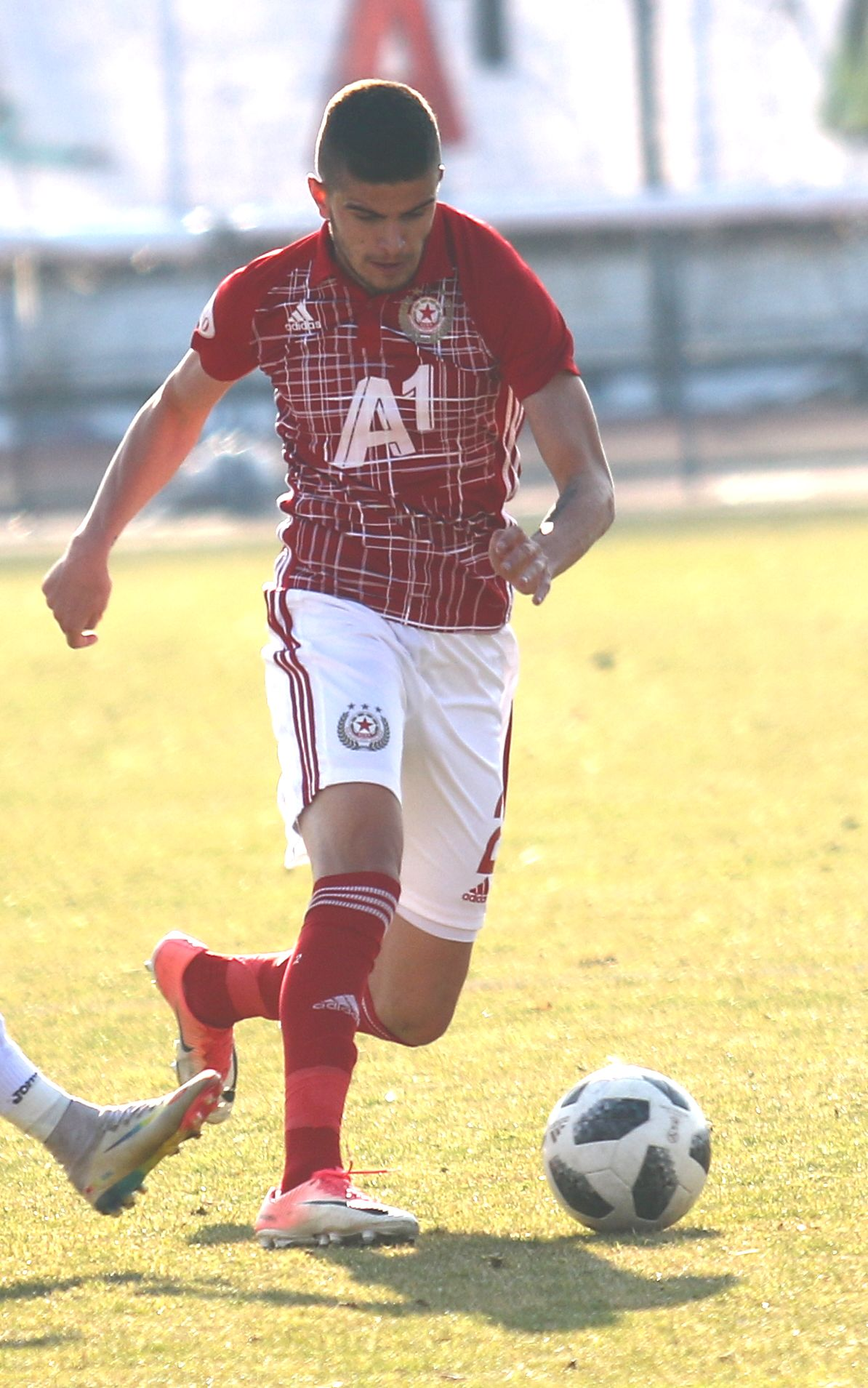

Personal information
- Full name: Stoycho Ivanov Atanasov
- Date of birth: 14 May 1997 (age 29)
- Place of birth: Burgas, Bulgaria
- Height: 1.77 m (5 ft 10 in)
- Position: Right-back

Youth career
- 2005–2014: Chernomorets Burgas

Senior career*
Years	Team	Apps	(Gls)
2014–2015	Chernomorets Burgas	21	(0)
2015–2016	Litex Lovech II	13	(0)
2016–2017	CSKA Sofia II	15	(1)
2016–2019	CSKA Sofia	27	(0)
2020–2021	Arda	4	(0)
2021–2022	Lokomotiv Sofia	9	(0)

International career
2013	Bulgaria U17	3	(0)
2015–2016	Bulgaria U19	6	(0)
2017–2018	Bulgaria U21	6	(0)
- * Club domestic league appearances and goals as of 4 June 2022

Stoycho Atanasov (Bulgarian: Стойчо Атанасов; born 14 May 1997) is a Bulgarian professional footballer who plays as a right-back.
