= Petko Ganev =

Bulgarian footballer

Personal information
- Full name: Petko Tanev Ganev
- Date of birth: 17 September 1996 (age 30)
- Place of birth: Dimitrovgrad, Bulgaria
- Height: 1.86 m (6 ft 1 in)
- Position: Centre back

Team information
- Current team: Sevlievo
- Number: 5

Senior career*
Years	Team	Apps	(Gls)
2014–2016	Vereya	52	(0)
2016–2017	Sozopol	12	(0)
2017–2020	Litex	74	(3)
2020	→ Botev Vratsa (loan)	10	(1)
2020–2022	Arda	21	(1)
2021	→ Litex (loan)	14	(2)
2022–2023	Montana	10	(0)
2023–2024	Botev Vratsa	9	(0)
2024–2025	Dobrudzha	24	(2)
2025	Hebar	5	(0)
2025–	Sevlievo	24	(1)
- * Club domestic league appearances and goals as of 11 June 2026

Petko Ganev (Bulgarian: Петко Ганев; born 17 September 1996) is a Bulgarian professional footballer who plays as a defender for Bulgarian Second League club Sevlievo.
