= Radoslav Uzunov =

Bulgarian footballer (born 2006)

Personal information
- Full name: Radoslav Aleksandrov Uzunov
- Date of birth: 25 March 2006 (age 20)
- Place of birth: Kardzhali, Bulgaria
- Height: 1.88 m (6 ft 2 in)
- Position: Centre-back

Team information
- Current team: Rodopa
- Number: 27

Youth career
- 2013–2019: Arda Kardzhali
- 2019–2020: Beroe
- 2020–2021: Arda Kardzhali
- 2021–2022: Septemvri Sofia
- 2022–2023: CSKA Sofia
- 2023: Levski Sofia

Senior career*
Years	Team	Apps	(Gls)
2021	Arda Kardzhali	2	(0)
2023–2024	Rodopa Smolyan	34	(0)
2025	Krumovgrad	0	(0)
2025–	Rodopa Smolyan	36	(3)
- * Club domestic league appearances and goals as of 11:39, 2 June 2026 (UTC) ‡ National team caps and goals as of 30 March 2021

Radoslav Uzunov (Bulgarian: Радослав Узунов; born 25 March 2006) is a Bulgarian footballer who plays as a centre-back for Rodopa Smolyan.

== Career ==
Uzunov started his career in Arda Kardzhali Academy at age of 7. In 2019 he moved to Beroe, but just a year after he rejoined Arda. In January 2021, at age of 14, he joined the first team of Arda. On 25 April 2021, at age of 15 years and 1 month, he became the youngest player to debut in the Bulgarian First League, beating the record of Yanko Kirilov from 1961 by one month, coming as a substitute in the 80th minute in the league match against Tsarsko Selo.

Uzunov joined Levski Sofia Academy in January 2023. In August 2023 he moved to Rodopa Smolyan. In January 2025, he signed a contract with Krumovgrad.

== Career statistics ==
=== Club ===
As of 19 May 2021

Club	League	Season	League		Cup		Continental		Total	
Club	League	Season	Apps	Goals	Apps	Goals	Apps	Goals	Apps	Goals
Arda Kardzhali	First League	2020–21	2	0	0	0	—		2	0
Career statistics			2	0	0	0	0	0	2	0
