= Georgi Atanasov (footballer) =

Bulgarian footballer

Georgi Atansov
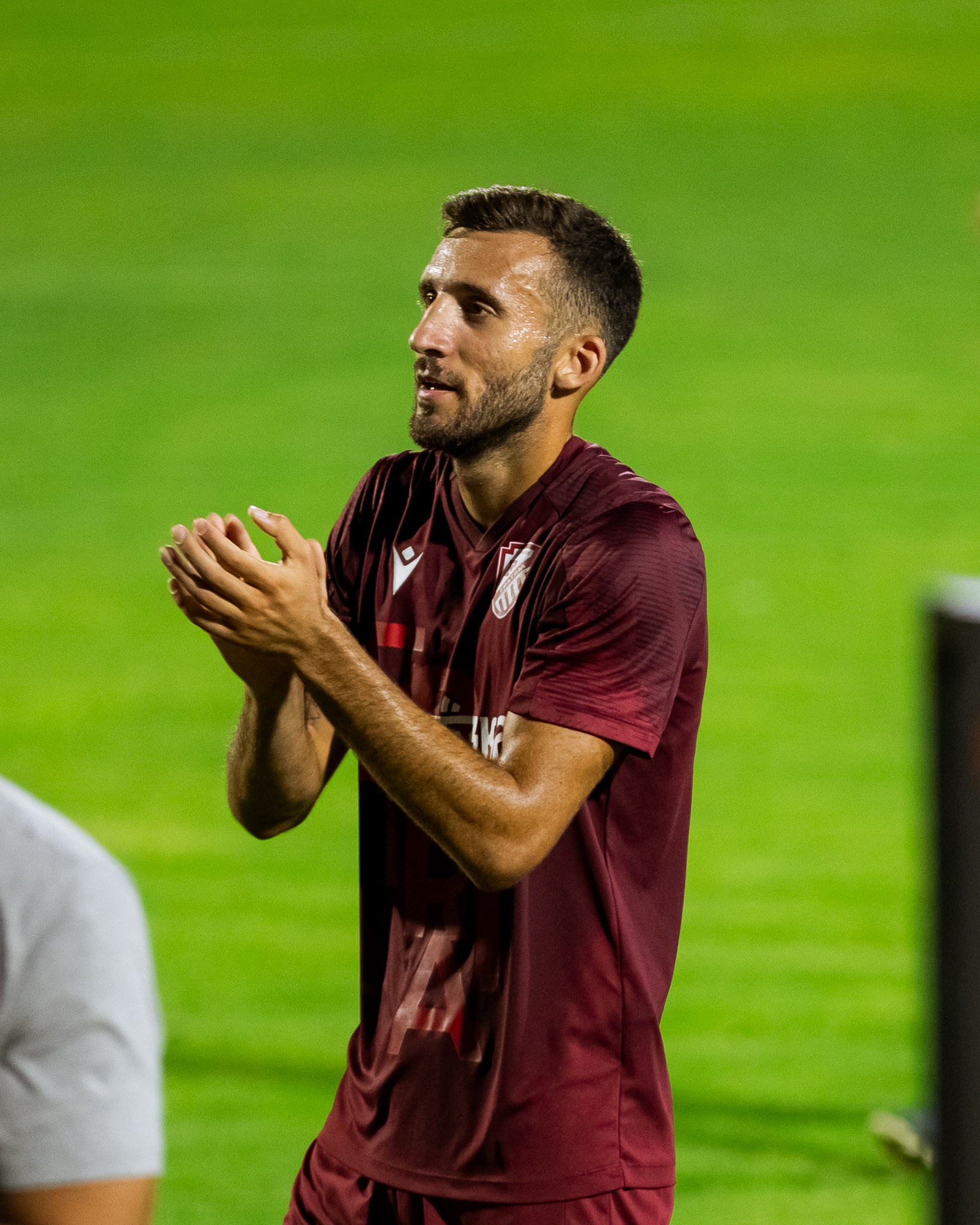

Personal information
- Full name: George Atanassov
- Date of birth: March 6, 2004 (age 22)
- Place of birth: Toronto, Ontario, Canada
- Height: 1.80 m (5 ft 11 in)
- Position: Winger

Team information
- Current team: Fratria
- Number: 22

Youth career
- –2017: Arda Kardzhali
- 2017–2021: Levski Sofia

Senior career*
Years	Team	Apps	(Gls)
2021–2023	Arda Kardzhali	20	(0)
2022	→ Sportist Svoge (loan)	11	(0)
2023–2024	Levski Sofia II	19	(4)
2025	Lovech	17	(0)
2025	Sportist Svoge	16	(1)
2026–	Fratria	25	(5)

International career^{‡}
2020	Bulgaria U17	2	(0)
2022	Bulgaria U19	5	(1)
- * Club domestic league appearances and goals as of 07:36, 20 November 2026 (UTC) ‡ National team caps and goals as of 12:10, 20 November 2023 (UTC)

Georgi Atanasov (Bulgarian: Георги Атанасов; born 6 March 2004) is a professional footballer who plays for Fratria. Born in Canada, he represents Bulgaria at youth international level.

== Career ==
=== Club ===
In January 2021, Atanasov left the youth side of Levski Sofia and signed a first team contract with Arda Kardzhali. He made his professional debut on February 27 as a substitute for Rumen Rumenov in a 3–2 defeat to Slavia Sofia. In July 2022 Atanasov was loaned to Second League side Sportist Svoge.

=== International ===
Eligible for Canada and Bulgaria, Atanasov has represented the latter at youth level.

In May 2022 Atanasov was named to the 60-man provisional Canadian U-20 team for the 2022 CONCACAF U-20 Championship.
