= Manolis Roussakis =

Greek footballer (born 1996)

Personal information
- Full name: Emmanouil Roussakis
- Date of birth: 15 February 1996 (age 30)
- Place of birth: Heraklion, Crete, Greece
- Height: 1.90 m (6 ft 3 in)
- Position: Centre-back

Youth career
- –2014: Panionios
- 2014–2015: OFI
- 2015–2016: Platanias

Senior career*
Years	Team	Apps	(Gls)
2016–2017	Panthrakikos	7	(0)
2017	Ermis Zoniana		
2017–2018	Anagennisi Karditsa	24	(0)
2018–2020	Platanias	34	(0)
2020–2021	Xanthi	0	(0)
2021	→ Arda Kardzhali (loan)	0	(0)
2021–2022	Irodotos	12	(0)
2022	Almopos Aridea	12	(1)
- * Club domestic league appearances and goals as of 1 May 2022

Manolis Roussakis (Greek: Μανώλης Ρουσσάκης; born 15 February 1996) is a Greek professional footballer who plays as a centre-back.
