= Plamen Krumov (footballer, born 1985) =

Bulgarian footballer

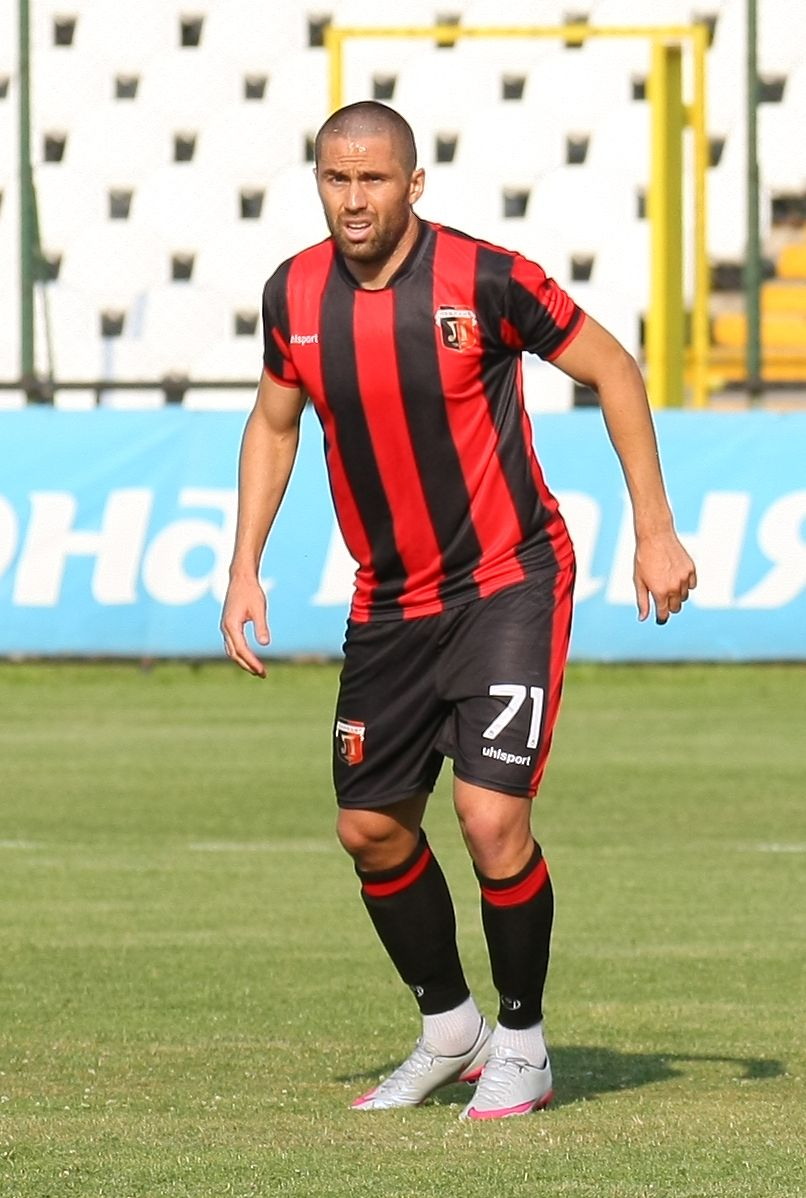
- Krumov with Lokomotiv Plovdiv in 2015

Personal information
- Full name: Plamen Asenov Krumov
- Date of birth: 4 November 1985 (age 41)
- Place of birth: Kazichene, Bulgaria
- Height: 1.81 m (5 ft 11 in)
- Positions: Right-back; winger

Team information
- Current team: Rilski Sportist (manager)

Youth career
- Lokomotiv Sofia

Senior career*
Years	Team	Apps	(Gls)
2003–2008	Lokomotiv Sofia	17	(2)
2006	→ Zagorets (loan)	8	(0)
2007	→ Rilski Sportist (loan)	14	(1)
2008	→ Banants (loan)	9	(1)
2009–2010	Minyor Pernik	27	(1)
2010–2011	Chernomorets Burgas	31	(0)
2012	Concordia Chiajna	15	(2)
2012	Universitatea Cluj	13	(0)
2013	Beroe Stara Zagora	32	(1)
2014	Levski Sofia	28	(1)
2015	Slavia Sofia	8	(0)
2015–2017	Lokomotiv Plovdiv	72	(0)
2018–2021	Arda Kardzhali	87	(5)
2022	Tsarsko Selo	9	(0)
2022–2023	Hebar	14	(1)
2023	Vitosha Bistritsa	15	(1)
Total		399	(16)

International career
2005	Bulgaria U21	2	(0)

Managerial career
- 2023–: Rilski Sportist
- * Club domestic league appearances and goals as of 5 June 2023

Plamen Krumov (Bulgarian: Пламен Крумов; born 4 November 1985) is a Bulgarian retired professional footballer and now manager, currently working at Rilski Sportist. In the early years of his career, he usually played as a winger, but has later been converted to right-back.

== Career ==
=== Playing ===
Krumov began his career at Lokomotiv Sofia where he made 17 A PFG appearances in four seasons. Whilst at Lokomotiv Stadium he spent time out on loan at Zagorets, Rilski Sportist and Armenian club Banants Yerevan before joining Minyor Pernik on a permanent basis in the early of 2009. He signed for Minyor on a one-and-a-half-year deal.

When his contract expired, Krumov joined Chernomorets Burgas on a free transfer. He played regularly for Chernomorets during the 2010–11 season and the first half of 2011–12 season.

On 8 February 2013, Krumov signed for Beroe Stara Zagora on a one-and-a-half-year deal. He made his league debut against Botev Vratsa on 2 March, playing the full 90 minutes.

On 3 February 2014, Krumov joined Levski Sofia for an undisclosed fee. He signed a one-and-a-half-year contract. Krumov received number 71 shirt. On 22 February, he made his official debut, scoring a goal against Slavia Sofia from a free kick to help his team secure a 2:2 draw.

=== Manager ===
On 26 August 2024 Krumov was announced as the new manager of Rilski Sportist, meaning he also retired from playing.

== Career statistics ==
As of 20 January 2018

Club	Season	League		Cup		Europe		Total	
Club	Season	Apps	Goals	Apps	Goals	Apps	Goals	Apps	Goals
Lokomotiv Sofia	2003–04	5	0	?	?	–	–	5	0
Lokomotiv Sofia	2004–05	11	1	?	?	–	–	11	1
Lokomotiv Sofia	2005–06	0	0	?	?	–	–	0	0
Zagorets (loan)	2006–07	8	0	?	?	–	–	8	0
Rilski Sportist (loan)	2006–07	14	1	?	?	–	–	14	1
Banants (loan)	2008	9	1	4	1	1	0	14	2
Lokomotiv Sofia	2007–08	1	1	?	?	–	–	1	1
Lokomotiv Sofia	Total	17	2	0	0	0	0	17	2
Minyor Pernik	2008–09	10	0	1	0	–	–	11	0
Minyor Pernik	2009–10	17	1	3	0	–	–	20	1
Minyor Pernik	Total	27	1	4	0	0	0	31	1
Chernomorets Burgas	2010–11	22	0	2	0	–	–	24	0
Chernomorets Burgas	2011–12	9	0	0	0	–	–	9	0
Chernomorets Burgas	Total	31	0	2	0	0	0	33	0
Concordia Chiajna	2011–12	15	2	0	0	–	–	15	2
Universitatea Cluj	2012–13	13	0	1	0	–	–	14	0
Beroe Stara Zagora	2012–13	11	1	5	0	–	–	16	1
Beroe Stara Zagora	2013–14	21	0	2	0	2	1	25	1
Beroe Stara Zagora	Total	32	1	7	0	2	1	41	2
Levski Sofia	2013–14	12	1	2	0	–	–	14	1
Levski Sofia	2014–15	16	0	2	0	–	–	18	0
Levski Sofia	Total	28	1	4	0	0	0	32	1
Slavia Sofia	2014–15	8	0	0	0	–	–	8	0
Lokomotiv Plovdiv	2015–16	28	0	2	0	–	–	30	0
Lokomotiv Plovdiv	2016–17	29	0	2	0	–	–	31	0
Lokomotiv Plovdiv	2017–18	15	0	1	0	–	–	16	0
Lokomotiv Plovdiv	Total	72	0	5	0	0	0	77	0
Career totals		274	9	27	1	3	1	304	11

== Honours ==
=== Club ===
Beroe

- Bulgarian Cup (1): 2012–13
- Bulgarian Supercup (1): 2013
