= Vasil Simeonov =

Bulgarian footballer

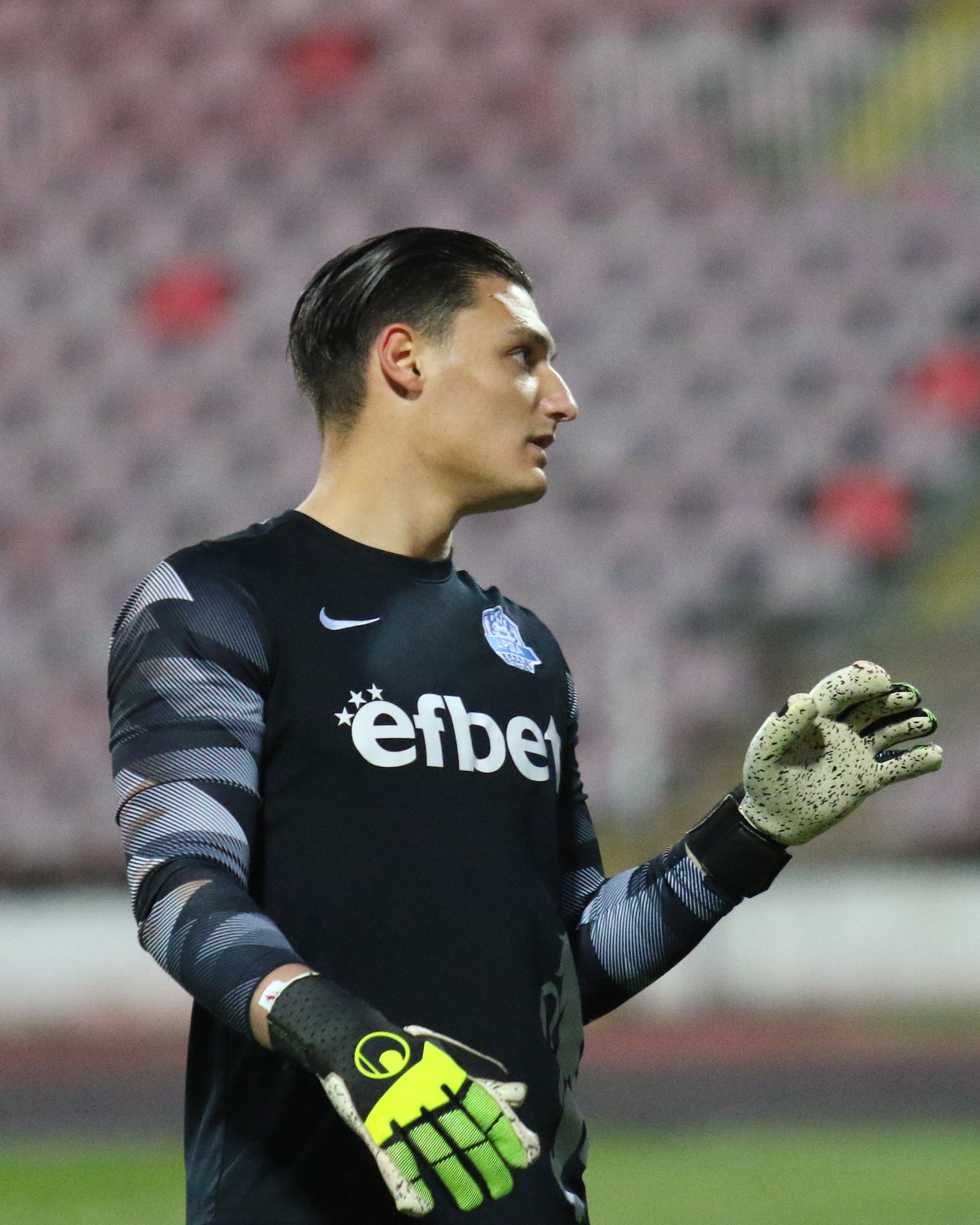

Personal information
- Full name: Vasil Ivaylov Simeonov
- Date of birth: 4 February 1998 (age 28)
- Place of birth: Botevgrad, Bulgaria
- Height: 1.83 m (6 ft 0 in)
- Position: Goalkeeper

Team information
- Current team: Montana
- Number: 30

Youth career
- Balkan Botevgrad
- –2017: Ludogorets

Senior career*
Years	Team	Apps	(Gls)
2016–2018	Ludogorets II	27	(0)
2016–2018	Ludogorets Razgrad	0	(0)
2019	Pirin Razlog	15	(0)
2019–2020	Montana	17	(0)
2020–2023	Arda Kardzhali	21	(0)
2023–	Montana	82	(0)
- * Club domestic league appearances and goals as of 11 June 2026

Vasil Simeonov (Bulgarian: Васил Симеонов; born 4 February 1998) is a Bulgarian professional footballer who plays as a goalkeeper for Montana.

== Career ==
=== Ludogorets Razgrad ===
Simeonov made his debut for the first team in the Bulgarian Cup match against Litex Lovech coming as a substitute in the 51st minute for the 7:0 win.

=== Montana ===
In June 2023, Simeonov joined Montana as a free agent, signing a two-year contract.

== Career statistics ==
=== Club ===
As of 29 May 2019

Club performance			League		Cup		Continental		Other		Total	
Club	League	Season	Apps	Goals	Apps	Goals	Apps	Goals	Apps	Goals	Apps	Goals
Bulgaria			League		Bulgarian Cup		Europe		Other (Note: Includes Bulgarian Supercup matches.)		Total	
Ludogorets Razgrad II	B Group	2015–16	0	0	–		–		–		0	0
Ludogorets Razgrad II	Second League	2016–17	9	0	–		–		–		9	0
Ludogorets Razgrad II	Second League	2017–18	16	0	–		–		–		16	0
Ludogorets Razgrad II	Second League	2018–19	2	0	–		–		–		2	0
Ludogorets Razgrad II	Total		27	0	0	0	0	0	0	0	27	0
Ludogorets Razgrad	First League	2016–17	0	0	1	0	0	0	—		1	0
Ludogorets Razgrad	Total		0	0	1	0	0	0	0	0	1	0
Career statistics			27	0	1	0	0	0	0	0	28	0
