= Emil Martinov =

Bulgarian footballer

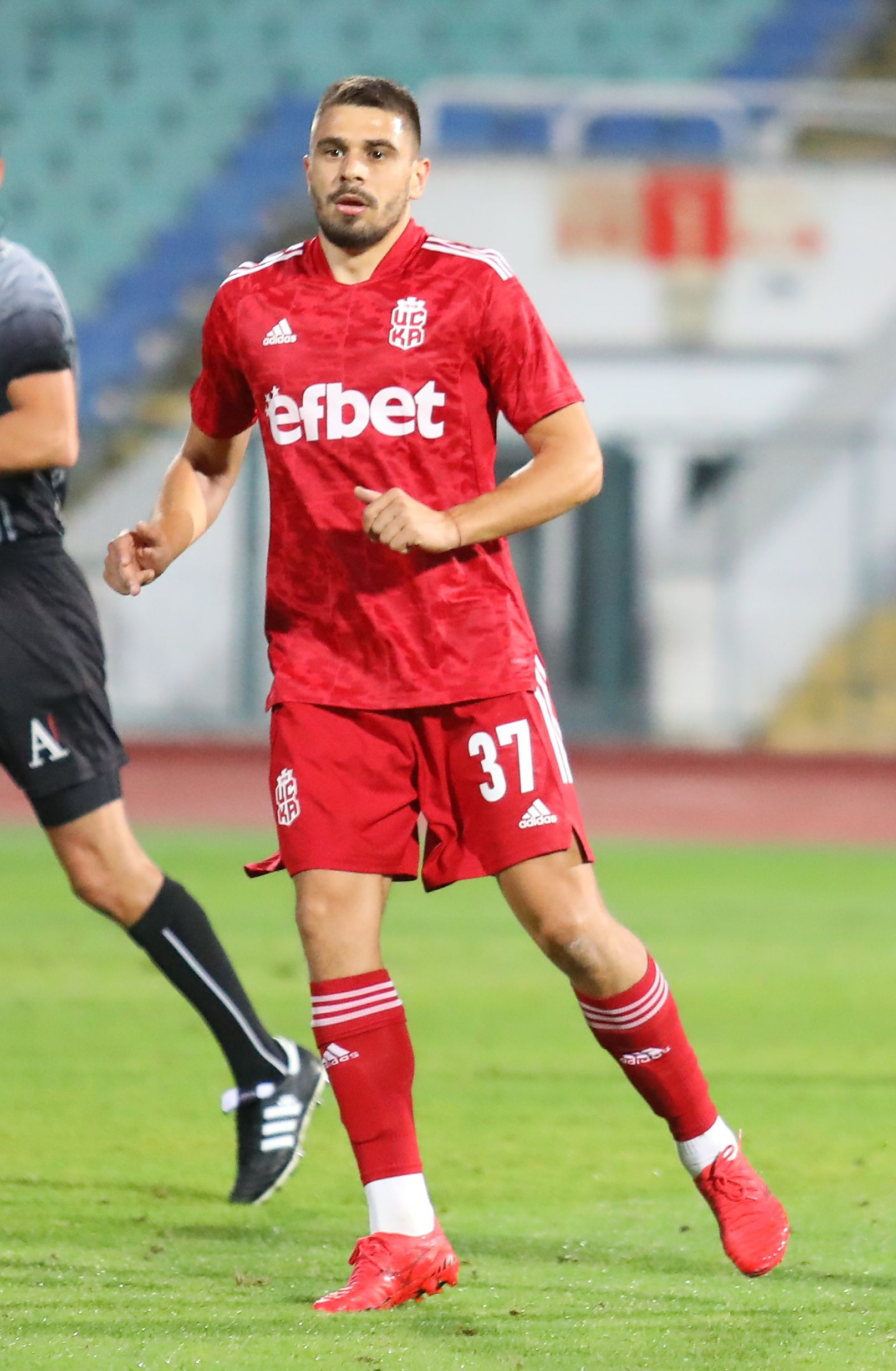

Personal information
- Full name: Emil Rosenov Martinov
- Date of birth: 18 March 1992 (age 34)
- Place of birth: Sofia, Bulgaria
- Height: 1.80 m (5 ft 11 in)
- Position: Defensive midfielder

Team information
- Current team: Rilski Sportist
- Number: 14

Youth career
- 1998–2010: Slavia Sofia

Senior career*
Years	Team	Apps	(Gls)
2009–2012	Slavia Sofia	1	(0)
2011	→ Dorostol (loan)	12	(0)
2011–2012	→ Svetkavitsa (loan)	12	(0)
2012	Sliven 2000	13	(0)
2013	Spartak Varna	10	(1)
2013–2014	Oborishte	13	(0)
2015–2018	Slavia Sofia	81	(1)
2018–2019	Sabail	21	(0)
2019–2021	Arda Kardzhali	62	(1)
2021–2022	CSKA 1948	21	(1)
2022–2023	Sabail	25	(0)
2023–2025	Slavia Sofia	60	(1)
2025	Botev Plovdiv	10	(0)
2026	Hebar	11	(0)
2026–	Rilski Sportist	14	(1)
- * Club domestic league appearances and goals as of 2 November 2026

Emil Martinov (Bulgarian: Емил Мартинов; born 18 March 1992) is a Bulgarian professional footballer who plays as a midfielder for Bulgarian Second League club Rilski Sportist.

== Club career ==
On 11 August 2018, Martinov signed contract with Azerbaijan Premier League side Sabail FK. In September 2021 he joined CSKA 1948.

== Honours ==
Slavia Sofia

- Bulgarian Cup: 2017–18
