= Aleks Petkov =

Bulgarian footballer

Personal information
- Full name: Aleks Milenov Petkov
- Date of birth: 25 July 1999 (age 27)
- Place of birth: Sofia, Bulgaria
- Height: 1.91 m (6 ft 3 in)
- Position: Centre-back

Team information
- Current team: Kifisia
- Number: 5

Youth career
- 2008–2016: Cherno More
- 2016–2017: Heart of Midlothian

Senior career*
Years	Team	Apps	(Gls)
2017–2020	Heart of Midlothian	0	(0)
2018	→ Berwick Rangers (loan)	6	(0)
2019–2020	→ Clyde (loan)	14	(0)
2020	→ Brechin City (loan)	4	(0)
2020	Levski Sofia	12	(0)
2021–2023	Arda Kardzhali	61	(2)
2023–2025	Śląsk Wrocław	57	(1)
2025–	Kifisia	24	(0)

International career^{‡}
2017	Bulgaria U18	2	(0)
2016	Bulgaria U19	1	(0)
2019–2020	Bulgaria U21	8	(0)
2022–	Bulgaria	17	(0)
- * Club domestic league appearances and goals as of 19 September 2026 ‡ National team caps and goals as of 6 June 2025

Aleks Milenov Petkov (Bulgarian: Алекс Миленов Петков; born 25 July 1999) is a Bulgarian professional footballer who plays as a centre-back for Greek Super League club Kifisia and the Bulgaria national team.

== Club career ==
Petkov began his career at Cherno More Varna and joined Heart of Midlothian at the age of 16 in June 2016, signing a three-year contract.

On 22 July 2017, Petkov made his first-team debut, replacing John Souttar during a 3–0 League Cup victory over East Fife at Tynecastle Park. On 19 January 2018, Petkov joined Scottish League Two side Berwick Rangers on loan until the end of the season. He made his league debut in a 2–3 home loss against Peterhead eleven days later, playing the full 90 minutes.

During the 2019–20 season Petkov was loaned to Clyde and Brechin City.

On 8 September 2020, Petkov returned to Bulgaria, signing a 1-year deal with Levski Sofia.

On 6 July 2023, after a two-year stint at Arda Kardzhali, Petkov joined Polish side Śląsk Wrocław on a one-year contract, with an option for another two years.

On 13 August 2025, Petkov signed with Super League Greece newly promoted A.E. Kifisia. Hours later, Śląsk released a statement claiming Petkov unilaterally terminated his contract with the club without just cause, and that they would be seeking compensation and fines for both the player and Kifisia.

== International career ==
Petkov made his debut for the Bulgarian under-21 team on 22 March 2019 in the starting eleven for the friendly against Northern Ireland U21. He earned his first cap for the senior national team on 26 March 2022, coming on as a substitute during the second half in the 1–2 loss against Qatar in a friendly match. On 16 November 2023, he scored an own goal in the 97th minute in the penultimate match of the UEFA Euro 2024 qualifying against Hungary.

== Personal life ==
His father Milen Petkov was also a professional footballer and Bulgarian international.

== Career statistics ==
=== International ===
As of match played 6 June 2025

Appearances and goals by national team and year
National team	Year	Apps	Goals
Bulgaria	2022	1	0
Bulgaria	2023	5	0
Bulgaria	2024	9	0
Bulgaria	2025	2	0
Total		17	0
