= Ivan Karadzhov =

Bulgarian footballer

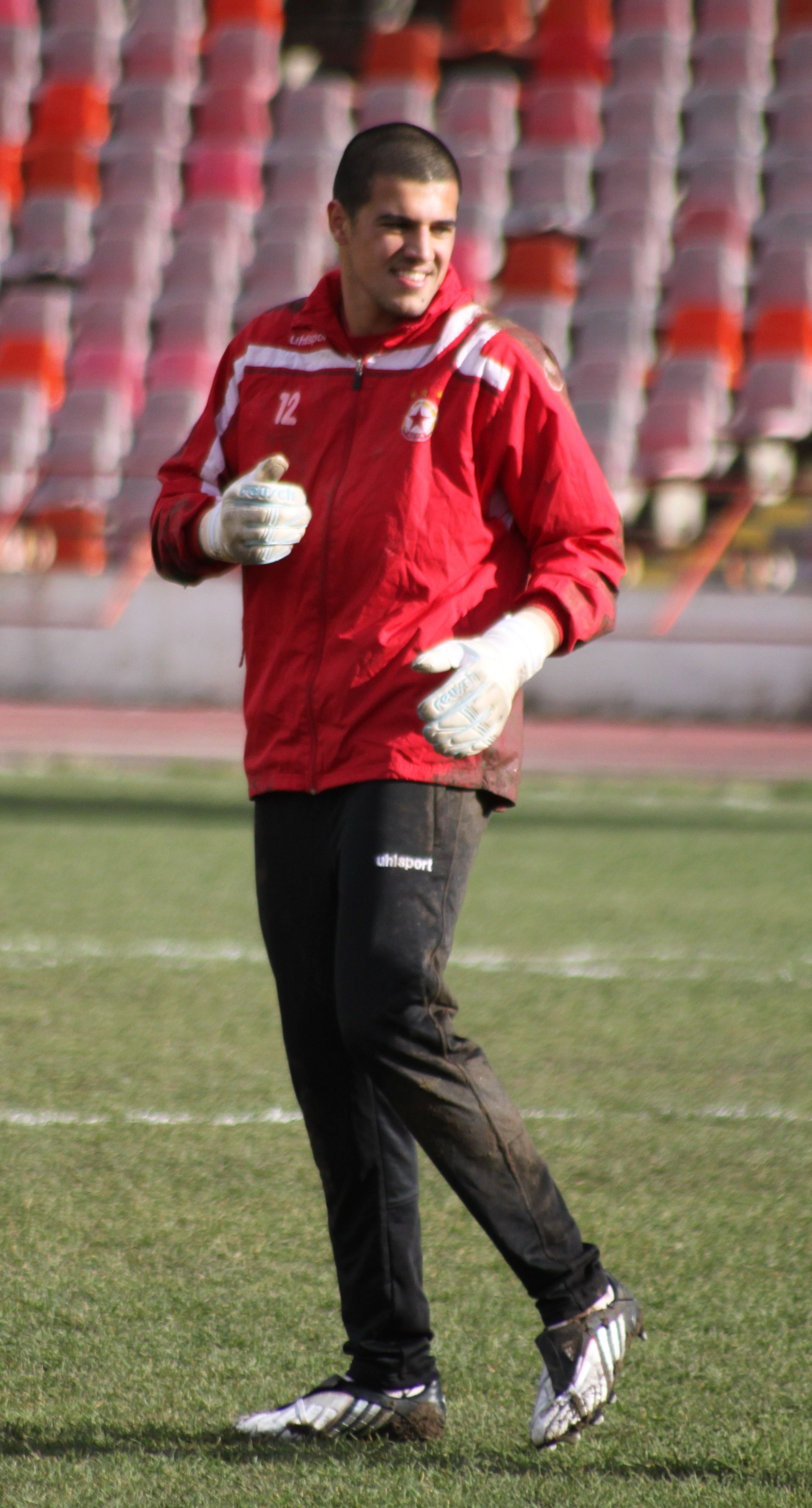
- Karadzhov with CSKA in 2010

Personal information
- Full name: Ivan Milchov Karadzhov
- Date of birth: 12 July 1989 (age 37)
- Place of birth: Kresna, Bulgaria
- Height: 1.86 m (6 ft 1 in)
- Position: Goalkeeper

Youth career
- 1999–2007: CSKA Sofia

Senior career*
Years	Team	Apps	(Gls)
2007–2011	CSKA Sofia	38	(0)
2007–2008	→ Rilski Sportist (loan)	21	(0)
2012	Lokomotiv Plovdiv	13	(0)
2012	Slavia Sofia	0	(0)
2013–2014	Beroe	51	(0)
2016–2017	Vereya	16	(0)
2017	Shakhtyor Soligorsk	15	(0)
2018–2021	Arda Kardzhali	95	(0)
2022	CSKA 1948	4	(0)
2022	→ CSKA 1948 II	7	(0)
2022–2023	Beroe	31	(0)

International career^{‡}
2007–2008	Bulgaria U19	3	(0)
2008–2009	Bulgaria U21	2	(0)
2021	Bulgaria	3	(0)
- * Club domestic league appearances and goals as of 11 June 2023 ‡ National team caps and goals as of 16 July 2022

Ivan Karadzhov (Bulgarian: Иван Караджов; born 12 July 1989) is a Bulgarian former footballer who played as a goalkeeper.

== Career ==
He made his official debut for CSKA in the last match of 2008-09 season in the Bulgarian A PFG (Professional Football Group) against Lokomotiv Mezdra. On 18 November he terminated his contract with CSKA Sofia due to unpaid salaries. He won the Bulgarian Cup as a member of Beroe. In February 2017, Karadzhov joined Belarusian Premier League side Shakhtyor Soligorsk. He appeared in 15 matches for the team before signing with Arda Kardzhali as a free agent in March 2018.

== International career ==
Karadzhov was part of the Bulgaria national under-19 football team, who plays on 2008 UEFA European Under-19 Football Championship in Czech Republic. After his good displays, on 2 October 2009 he was called by the head coach of the Bulgaria national football team Stanimir Stoilov for the matches against Cyprus and Georgia. He did not receive any national team call-ups again until November 2020, and he finally made his debut for the senior team on 5 June 2021 in a friendly against Russia.

== Personal life ==
Karadzhov and his spouse Slavina have two children - a girl and a boy.

== Honours ==
=== Club ===
CSKA Sofia

- Bulgarian Supercup: 2008; 2011
- Bulgarian Cup: 2010–11

Beroe

- Bulgarian Cup: 2012–13
- Bulgarian Supercup: 2013
