= Deyan Lozev =

Bulgarian footballer

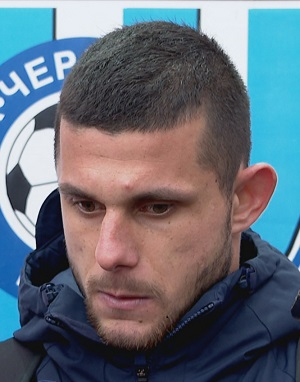

Personal information
- Full name: Deyan Lachezarov Lozev
- Date of birth: 26 October 1993 (age 33)
- Place of birth: Haskovo, Bulgaria
- Height: 1.74 m (5 ft 9 in)
- Positions: Right-back; winger

Team information
- Current team: Spartak Varna
- Number: 20

Senior career*
Years	Team	Apps	(Gls)
2011–2013	Lyubimets 2007	12	(0)
2013–2015	Haskovo	49	(5)
2015	Dunav Ruse	12	(0)
2016–2017	Pomorie	45	(1)
2018–2019	Arda	43	(5)
2019–2020	Levski Sofia	6	(0)
2020–2021	Arda	30	(0)
2021–2022	CSKA 1948	8	(0)
2021–2022	CSKA 1948 II	4	(0)
2022–2024	Arda	53	(0)
2024	Botev Vratsa	16	(0)
2025–	Spartak Varna	35	(0)
- * Club domestic league appearances and goals as of 1 June 2026

Deyan Lachezarov Lozev (Bulgarian: Деян Лъчезаров Лозев; born 26 October 1993) is a Bulgarian professional footballer who plays as a right-back or winger for Spartak Varna.

== Club career ==
Lozev was signed by Levski Sofia in December 2019. He joined CSKA 1948 in September 2021.

== International career ==
Lozev received his first call-up for senior Bulgarian squad on 8 October 2019 UEFA Euro 2020 qualifying matches against Montenegro and England on 11 and 14 October, replacing Strahil Popov who had gotten injured just before the team's first training session.
