= Ivan Tilev =

Bulgarian footballer

Personal information
- Full name: Ivan Angelov Tilev
- Date of birth: 5 January 1999 (age 27)
- Place of birth: Pazardzhik, Bulgaria
- Height: 1.82 m (6 ft 0 in)
- Position: Winger

Team information
- Current team: Hebar
- Number: 33

Youth career
- 2013–2015: Dit Sofia
- 2015–2016: Septemvri Sofia

Senior career*
Years	Team	Apps	(Gls)
2016–2020	Septemvri Sofia	100	(6)
2017	→ Tsarsko Selo (loan)	2	(0)
2020–2025	Arda Kardzhali	165	(11)
2026–	Hebar	14	(2)

International career^{‡}
2015–2016	Bulgaria U17	6	(2)
2016–2017	Bulgaria U18	3	(0)
2016–2018	Bulgaria U19	19	(1)
2019–2020	Bulgaria U21	5	(0)
- * Club domestic league appearances and goals as of 11 June 2026 ‡ National team caps and goals as of 23:32, 17 November 2020 (UTC)

Ivan Angelov Tilev (Bulgarian: Иван Ангелов Тилев; born 5 January 1999) is a Bulgarian footballer who plays as a winger for Hebar Pazardzhik.

== Career ==
=== Septemvri Sofia ===
Tilev made his debut for Septemvri on 6 August 2016 in a match against Spartak Pleven and scoring his first goal for the team.

After the team promotion to First League on 7 August 2017 Tilev was sent on loan to Tsarsko Selo. He made his debut for the team in match against Strumska Slava Radomir on 19 August 2017. Tilev was called back to Septemvri on 1 September 2017 after a manager change in Septemvri and the return of Nikolay Mitov. Tilev completed his debut for the team on 11 September 2017 in a match against Etar Veliko Tarnovo.

== International career ==
=== Youth levels ===
Tilev was called up for the Bulgaria U19 team for the 2017 European Under-19 Championship qualification from 22 to 27 March 2017. Playing in all three matches, Bulgaria qualified for the knockout phase.

Tilev made his debut for the Bulgarian under-21 team on 22 March 2019 during a friendly against Northern Ireland U21.

== Honours ==
=== Club ===
FC Arda Kardzhali

- Bulgarian Cup
  - Runners-up (1): 2020–21

== Career statistics ==
=== Club ===
As of 13 May 2018

Club performance			League		Cup		Continental		Other		Total	
Club	League	Season	Apps	Goals	Apps	Goals	Apps	Goals	Apps	Goals	Apps	Goals
Bulgaria			League		Bulgarian Cup		Europe		Other		Total	
Septemvri Sofia	Second League	2016–17	24	1	1	0	–		0	0	25	1
Septemvri Sofia	First League	2017–18	24	0	2	0	–		0	0	26	0
Septemvri Sofia	Total		48	1	3	0	0	0	0	0	51	1
Tsarsko Selo (loan)	Second League	2017–18	2	0	0	0	–		–		2	0
Career statistics			50	1	3	0	0	0	0	0	53	1
