= Milen Stoev =

Bulgarian footballer

Personal information
- Full name: Milen Yankov Stoev
- Date of birth: 19 September 1999 (age 27)
- Place of birth: Sandanski, Bulgaria
- Height: 1.83 m (6 ft 0 in)
- Position: Defender

Team information
- Current team: Botev Vratsa
- Number: 36

Youth career
- Vihren Sandanski

Senior career*
Years	Team	Apps	(Gls)
2017–2018	Vihren Sandanski	27	(1)
2018–2024	Arda Kardzhali	103	(0)
2019	→ Pirin (loan)	10	(1)
2025	Spartak Varna	12	(1)
2025–	Botev Vratsa	35	(2)

International career
2020	Bulgaria U21	1	(0)
- * Club domestic league appearances and goals as of 11 June 2026

Milen Stoev (Bulgarian: Милен Стоев; born 29 September 1999) is a Bulgarian professional footballer who plays as a defender for Botev Vratsa.
