= Juninho (footballer, born 1999) =

Brazilian footballer

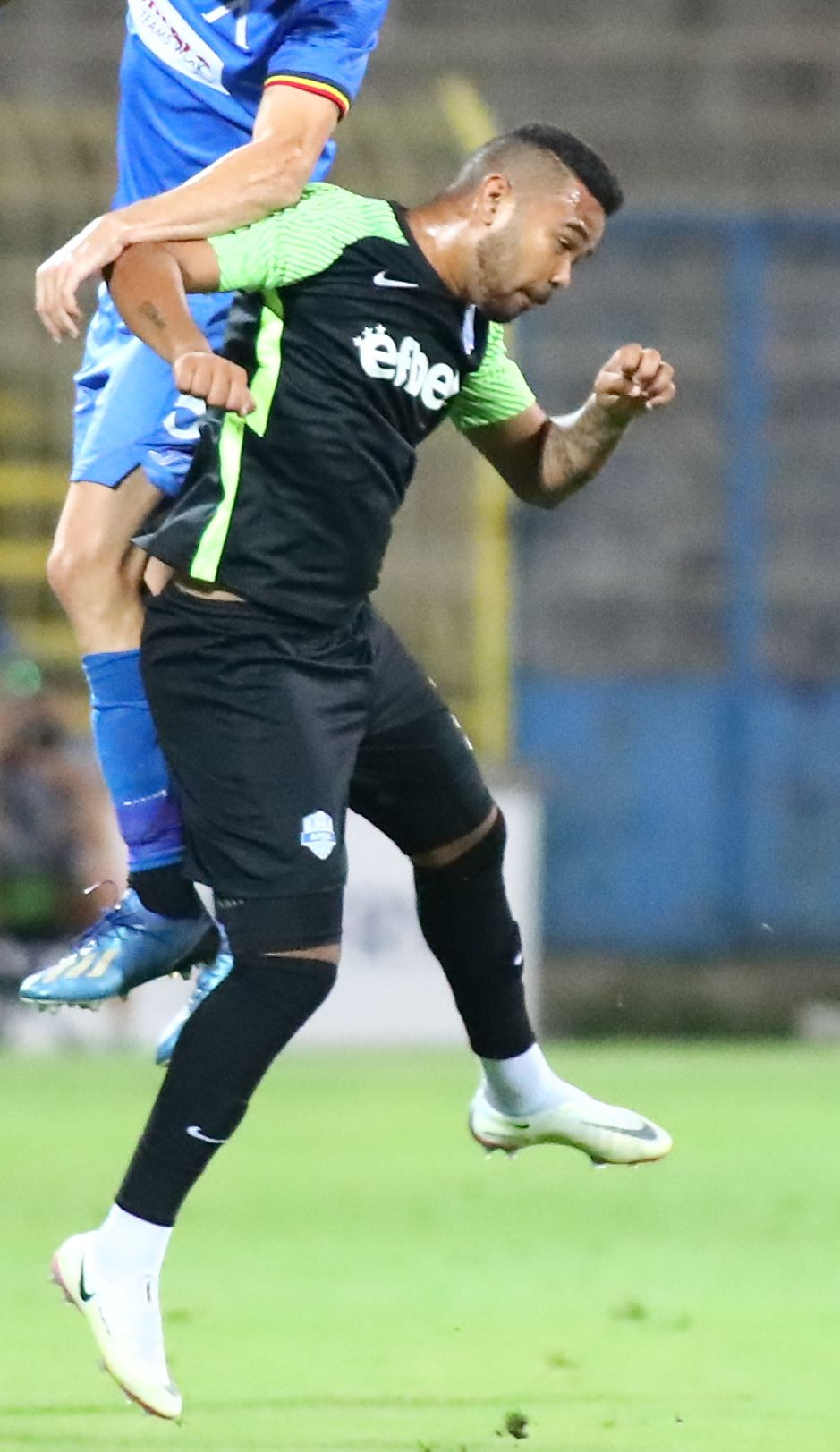

Personal information
- Full name: Edimar Ribeiro da Costa Junior
- Date of birth: 26 February 1999 (age 27)
- Place of birth: Amarante, Brazil
- Height: 1.78 m (5 ft 10 in)
- Position: Forward

Team information
- Current team: Al-Muharraq
- Number: 37

Youth career
- 2014–2015: Flamengo do Piauí 2015-2016 Sport Recife

Senior career*
Years	Team	Apps	(Gls)
2016–2020	Sport Recife	56	(8)
2018	→ Ceará (loan)	5	(0)
2020	→ Guarani (loan)	2	(1)
2020–2021	Arda	26	(5)
2022–2023	CSKA 1948 II	6	(5)
2022–2023	→ Al-Najma (loan)	?	(?)
2023–2024	Al-Najma	?	(20)
Current	Al-Muharraq		

International career^{‡}
2017	Brazil U20	3	(0)
- * Club domestic league appearances and goals as of 01:08, 6 August 2022 (UTC) ‡ National team caps and goals as of 20:31, 5 July 2019 (UTC)

Edimar Ribeiro da Costa Junior (born 26 February 1999), commonly known as Juninho, is a Brazilian footballer who plays as a forward for Bahraini side Al-Muharraq.

== International career ==
Juninho was called up to the Brazil under-20 squad for the 2017 Toulon Tournament. He made his first appearance as a second half substitute for Gabriel Novaes in a 1–0 win over Indonesia.

== Career statistics ==
=== Club ===
As of 5 July 2019.

Club	Season	League			State League		Cup		Continental		Other		Total	
Club	Season	Division	Apps	Goals	Apps	Goals	Apps	Goals	Apps	Goals	Apps	Goals	Apps	Goals
Sport Recife	2016	Série A	0	0	2 (Note: Appearances in the Campeonato Pernambucano)	0	1 (Note: Appearances in the Copa do Brasil)	0	–		2 (Note: Appearances in the Copa do Nordeste)	0	5	0
Sport Recife	2017	Série A	13	0	8	3	2	1	2 (Note: Appearances in the Copa Sudamericana)	0	5	2	30	6
Sport Recife	2018	Série A	0	0	2	0	0	0	–		0	0	2	0
Sport Recife	2019	Série B	4	0	7	1	1	0	–		0	0	12	1
Sport Recife	Total		17	0	19	4	4	1	2	0	7	2	49	7
Ceará (loan)	2018	Série A	2	0	0	0	0	0	–		3	0	5	0
Career total			19	0	19	4	4	1	2	0	10	2	54	7
