= Rumen Rumenov =

Bulgarian footballer

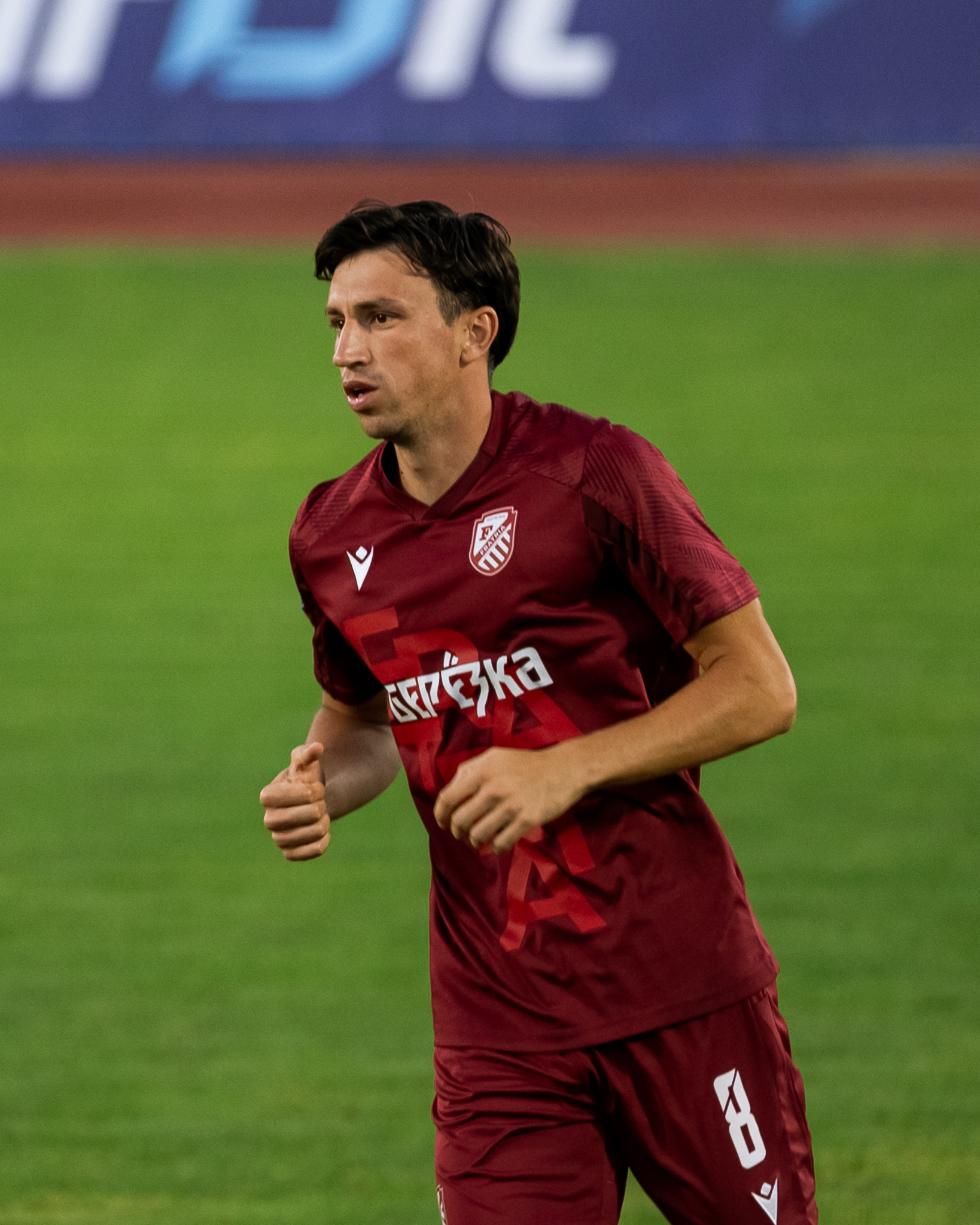
- Rumenov playing for Fratria in 2026.

Personal information
- Full name: Rumen Ivaylov Rumenov
- Date of birth: 7 June 1993 (age 33)
- Place of birth: Shumen, Bulgaria
- Height: 1.84 m (6 ft 0 in)
- Positions: Attacking midfielder; winger

Team information
- Current team: Fratria
- Number: 8

Youth career
- 2000–2008: Volov Shumen
- 2008–2011: Litex Lovech

Senior career*
Years	Team	Apps	(Gls)
2011–2016	Litex Lovech	53	(2)
2015–2016	Litex Lovech II	18	(3)
2016–2017	CSKA Sofia II	13	(3)
2016–2017	CSKA Sofia	1	(0)
2016	→ Neftochimic (loan)	11	(0)
2017–2019	Etar	77	(6)
2020–2022	Arda	63	(5)
2022–2024	Spartak Varna	49	(11)
2024–2025	Dobrudzha	38	(12)
2025–	Fratria	36	(5)

International career
2011	Bulgaria U19	3	(0)
- * Club domestic league appearances and goals as of 07:32, 20 November 2026 (UTC)

Rumen Ivaylov Rumenov (Bulgarian: Румен Руменов; born 7 June 1993) is a Bulgarian professional footballer who plays as a midfielder for Fratria.

== Career ==
Rumenov began his football career at Volov Shumen academy, before moving to Litex Lovech academy in 2008. He made his competitive first team debut for Litex against Pirin Blagoevgrad on 12 March 2011 as a substitute. He played for Litex until 2016, when most of the players were moved to CSKA Sofia, where he joined their second squad.

In September 2016 he was sent on loan from CSKA to Neftochimic until end of season. On 12 June 2017 he left CSKA Sofia to join the newly promoted to the Bulgarian First League team of Etar Veliko Tarnovo.

In December 2019, his good games with Etar, made CSKA to express desire to get him back in CSKA. Instead, in January 2020 he chose to continue his career with Arda Kardzhali. In August 2022 Rumenov joined newly promoted Spartak Varna. Few days after the team secured their return in First League, they announced that Rumenov would leave the team by mutual agreement.

Few days later, he moved to Dobrudzha Dobrich. Despite being one of the best players for Dobrudzha and marking his second season helping his team to promote to First League, Rumenov didn't start the 2025–26 season as a titular in First League and few other elite teams were interested in signing him. On 6 September Dobrudzha announced that Rumenov would leave the team.

On 10 September 2025, Fratria announced Rumenov, marking their ambitious to win Second League and promote to Bulgarian First League.

== Career statistics ==
As of 26 May 2026

Club	Season	Division	League		Cup		Europe		Other		Total	
Club	Season	Division	Apps	Goals	Apps	Goals	Apps	Goals	Apps	Goals	Apps	Goals
Litex Lovech	2010–11	A Group	6	0	1	0	0	0	–		7	0
Litex Lovech	2011–12	A Group	3	0	1	0	0	0	–		4	0
Litex Lovech	2012–13	A Group	1	0	0	0	–		–		1	0
Litex Lovech	2013–14	A Group	17	1	3	0	–		–		20	1
Litex Lovech	2014–15	A Group	26	1	4	0	4	0	–		34	1
Litex Lovech	2015–16	A Group	0	0	0	0	1	0	–		1	0
Litex Lovech	Total		53	2	9	0	5	0	0	0	67	2
Litex Lovech II	2015–16	B Group	18	3	–		–		–		18	3
CSKA Sofia II	2016–17	Second League	13	3	–		–		–		13	3
Neftochimic Burgas	2016–17	First League	11	0	2	0	–		–		13	0
CSKA Sofia	2016–17	First League	1	0	–		–		–		1	0
Etar Veliko Tarnovo	2017–18	First League	29	1	3	2	–		–		32	3
Etar Veliko Tarnovo	2018–19	First League	31	3	2	1	–		1	0	34	4
Etar Veliko Tarnovo	2019–20	First League	17	2	0	0	–		–		17	2
Etar Veliko Tarnovo	Total		77	6	5	3	0	0	1	0	83	9
Arda Kardzhali	2019–20	First League	7	1	0	0	–		1	0	8	1
Arda Kardzhali	2020–21	First League	26	3	5	0	–		1	0	32	3
Arda Kardzhali	2021–22	First League	28	1	2	0	1	0	–		31	1
Arda Kardzhali	2022–23	First League	2	0	0	0	–		–		2	0
Arda Kardzhali	Total		63	5	7	0	1	0	2	0	73	5
Spartak Varna	2022–23	First League	22	3	2	0	–		–		24	3
Spartak Varna	2023–24	Second League	27	8	3	0	–		–		30	8
Spartak Varna	Total		49	11	5	0	0	0	0	0	54	11
Dobrudzha Dobrich	2024–25	Second League	31	12	1	0	–		–		32	12
Dobrudzha Dobrich	2025–26	First League	7	0	0	0	–		–		7	0
Dobrudzha Dobrich	Total		38	12	1	0	0	0	0	0	39	12
Fratria	2025–26	Second League	22	3	2	0	–		–		24	3
Career Total			349	45	22	3	6	0	3	0	380	48

== Honours ==
Litex Lovech

- A Group: 2010–11

Spartak Varna

- Second League: 2023–24

Dobrudzha

- Second League: 2024–25
