= 2024–25 FC CSKA 1948 Sofia season =

FC CSKA 1948 Sofia
2024–25 season
- Manager: Valentin Iliev
- Stadium: Stadion Bistritsa
- First Professional Football League: 11th
- Bulgarian Cup: Pre-season
- UEFA Conference League: Third qualifying round

The 2024–25 season is the ninth season in the history of FC CSKA 1948 Sofia, and the club's fifth consecutive season in the First Professional Football League. In addition to the domestic league, the team is scheduled to participate in the Bulgarian Cup and the UEFA Conference League.

== Transfers ==
=== Out ===
Pos.	Player	Transferred to	Fee	Date	Source
DF	(Bulgaria) Simeon Petrov	(Poland) Śląsk Wrocław	Undisclosed	1 July 2024	

== Friendlies ==
=== Pre-season ===
25 June 2024 Friendly	CSKA 1948 (Bulgaria)	3–0	(Bulgaria) Strumska Slava Radomir

4 July 2024 Friendly	Maribor (Slovenia)	2–1	(Bulgaria) CSKA 1948

6 July 2024 Friendly	CSKA 1948 (Bulgaria)	1–1	(Hungary) Ferencvárosi TC

10 July 2024 Friendly	Dinamo Zagreb (Croatia)	6–2	(Bulgaria) CSKA 1948

13 July 2024 Friendly	Olimpija Ljubljana (Slovenia)	3–0	(Bulgaria) CSKA 1948

== Competitions ==
=== Overall record ===
Competition	First match	Last match	Starting round	Record							
Competition	First match	Last match	Starting round	Pld	W	D	L	GF	GA	GD	Win %
First Professional Football League	19 July 2024		Matchday 1	2	0	2	0	2	2	+0	0.00
Bulgarian Cup				2	1	1	0	2	1	+1	50.00
Total				4	1	3	0	4	3	+1	25.00

Last updated: 1 August 2024
Source: Soccerway

=== First Professional Football League ===
==== League table ====
Pos	Team	Pld	W	D	L	GF	GA	GD	Pts	Qualification
8	Beroe	30	12	6	12	34	29	+5	42 (Note: Head-to-head away goals: Beroe 1; Slavia Sofia 0.)	Qualification for the Conference League group
9	Slavia Sofia	30	12	6	12	43	42	+1	42	Qualification for the Relegation group
10	CSKA 1948	30	8	10	12	38	44	−6	34	Qualification for the Relegation group
11	Septemvri Sofia	30	10	3	17	32	47	−15	33	Qualification for the Relegation group
12	Lokomotiv Sofia	30	8	6	16	29	49	−20	30 (Note: Head-to-head points: Lokomotiv Sofia 4; Krumovgrad 1.)	Qualification for the Relegation group

Source: soccerway, Bulgarian Football
Rules for classification: 1) Points; 2) Head-to-head points; 3) Head-to-head goal difference; 4) Head-to-head goals scored; 5) Head-to-head away goals scored (only if two teams); 6) Goal difference; 7) Goals scored; 8) Fairplay ranking; 9) Draw
Notes:

Pos	Team	Pld	W	D	L	GF	GA	GD	Pts	Qualification	LUD	LEV	CHM	ARD
1	Ludogorets Razgrad (C)	36	25	8	3	70	22	+48	83	Qualification for the Champions League first qualifying round	—	1–1	2–0	2–2
2	Levski Sofia	36	21	9	6	64	29	+35	72	Qualification for the Europa League first qualifying round (Note: As Ludogorets Razgrad won the 2024–25 Bulgarian Cup, the cup's Europa League first qualifying round berth was passed to the second-placed team in the First League.)	2–2	—	2–0	1–1
3	Cherno More	36	15	14	7	44	30	+14	59	Qualification for the Conference League second qualifying round	2–0	0–0	—	1–1
4	Arda (O)	36	15	13	8	54	41	+13	58	Qualification for the Conference League play-off	1–1	0–3	0–0	—

Source: soccerway, Bulgarian Football
Legend: Blue = home team win; Yellow = draw; Red = away team win.
Rules for classification: 1) Points; 2) Head-to-head points; 3) Head-to-head goal difference; 4) Head-to-head goals scored; 5) Head-to-head away goals scored (only if two teams); 6) Goal difference; 7) Goals scored; 8) Fairplay ranking; 9) Draw
(C) Champions; (O) Play-off winners
Notes:

Pos	Team	Pld	W	D	L	GF	GA	GD	Pts	Qualification	CSS	BPD	SPV	BER
1	CSKA Sofia	36	19	8	9	58	28	+30	65	Qualification for the Conference League play-off	—	3–0	5–0	2–1
2	Botev Plovdiv	36	16	8	12	43	43	0	56		0–4	—	3–2	1–1
3	Spartak Varna	36	15	6	15	45	53	−8	51		0–1	2–1	—	1–2
4	Beroe	36	14	7	15	41	43	−2	49		0–3	0–6	3–1	—

Source: soccerway, Bulgarian Football
Legend: Blue = home team win; Yellow = draw; Red = away team win.
Rules for classification: 1) Points; 2) Head-to-head points; 3) Head-to-head goal difference; 4) Head-to-head goals scored; 5) Head-to-head away goals scored (only if two teams); 6) Goal difference; 7) Goals scored; 8) Fairplay ranking; 9) Draw

Pos	Team	Pld	W	D	L	GF	GA	GD	Pts	Qualification or relegation	SLA	LSO	CSK	SEP	LPD	BVR	KRU	HEB
1	Slavia Sofia	37	14	7	16	50	52	−2	49		—	0–0	0–1	—	1–2	—	—	3–2
2	Lokomotiv Sofia	37	13	8	16	43	51	−8	47 (Note: Head-to-head points: Lokomotiv Sofia 4; CSKA 1948 1.)		—	—	2–1	—	—	3–0	3–0	3–0
3	CSKA 1948	37	12	11	14	45	47	−2	47		—	—	—	2–0	—	0–1	2–0	0–0
4	Septemvri Sofia	37	14	3	20	42	56	−14	45		3–1	0–2	—	—	2–0	—	—	1–0
5	Lokomotiv Plovdiv (O)	37	10	8	19	37	49	−12	38	Qualification for the relegation play-off	—	1–1	0–1	—	—	1–3	—	—
6	Botev Vratsa (O)	37	10	6	21	34	65	−31	36	Qualification for the relegation play-off	2–1	—	—	3–2	—	—	1–0	—
7	Krumovgrad (R)	37	8	9	20	20	45	−25	33	Relegation to the Second League	0–1	—	—	1–2	0–4	—	—	—
8	Hebar (R)	37	4	9	24	28	64	−36	21	Relegation to the Second League	—	—	—	—	1–2	1–0	1–3	—

Source: Soccerway, Bulgarian Football
Legend: Blue = home team win; Yellow = draw; Red = away team win.
Rules for classification: 1) Points; 2) Head-to-head points (only in regular season); 3) Head-to-head goal difference (only in regular season); 4) Head-to-head goals scored (only in regular season); 5) Head-to-head away goals scored (only if two teams and only in regular season); 6) Goal difference; 7) Goals scored; 8) Fairplay ranking; 9) Draw
(O) Play-off winners; (R) Relegated

==== Results summary ====
Overall								Home						Away					
Pld	W	D	L	GF	GA	GD	Pts	W	D	L	GF	GA	GD	W	D	L	GF	GA	GD
2	0	2	0	2	2	0	2	0	1	0	2	2	0	0	1	0	0	0	0

Last updated: 28 July 2024.

==== Results by round ====
Round	1	2	3
Ground	A	H	A
Result	D	D	P
Position			

Updated to match(es) played on 28 July 2024. Source:
A = Away; H = Home; W = Win; D = Draw; L = Loss

==== Matches ====
The match schedule was released on 13 June 2024.

19 July 2024 1	Cherno More	0–0	CSKA 1948	Varna
18:45 UTC+3			Bidounga (red card) 90'	Stadium: Stadion Ticha

28 July 2024 2	CSKA 1948	2–2	Spartak Varna	Sofia
19:00 UTC+3				Stadium: Stadion Bistritsa

5 August 2024 3	Septemvri Sofia	v	CSKA 1948

=== UEFA Conference League ===
==== Second qualifying round ====
25 July 2024 First leg	CSKA 1948 (Bulgaria)	1–0	(Montenegro) Budućnost Podgorica	Sofia
20:30 UTC+3	Karagaren 44'	Report		Stadium: Vasil Levski National Stadium; Referee: Irakli Kvirikashvili (Georgia)

1 August 2024 First leg	Budućnost Podgorica (Montenegro)	1–1 (a.e.t.) (1–2 agg.)	(Bulgaria) CSKA 1948	Podgorica, Montenegro
21:00 UTC+2		Report		Stadium: DG Arena

==== Third qualifying round ====
8 August 2024 First leg	CSKA 1948 (Bulgaria)	v	(Cyprus) Pafos FC	Sofia
20:30 UTC+3				Stadium: Vasil Levski National Stadium

15 August 2024 Second leg	Pafos FC (Cyprus)	v	(Bulgaria) CSKA 1948	Cyprus
20:00 UTC+3
