= 2021–22 Third Amateur Football League (Bulgaria) =

Third Amateur Football League
- Season: 2021–22
- Promoted: Dunav Ruse; Krumovgrad; Spartak Pleven; Belasitsa Petrich; Vitosha

The 2021–22 Third Amateur Football League season was the 72nd of the Bulgarian Third Amateur League. The group is equivalent to the third level of the Bulgarian football pyramid, comprising four divisions based on geographical areas. These divisions are the North-West, North-East, South-East, and South-West. The number of teams in each division varies, similarly to previous seasons.

== Team changes ==
=== Promoted to Second League ===
- Spartak Varna
- Levski Lom
- Marek Dupnitsa
- Maritsa Plovdiv

=== Relegated to Regional Leagues ===
- Benkovski Byala
- Kubrat
- Tryavna
- Perun Kresna
- Velbazhd Kyustendil
- Spartak Plovdiv
- Vereya

=== Promoted from Regional Leagues ===
- Pirin II
- Kostinbrod
- Asenovets Asenovgrad
- Krumovgrad
- Lokomotiv II Plovdiv
- Beroe II
- Septemvri II Sofia
- Hebar II
- Spartak Varna II
- Lokomotiv Ruse
- Riltsi

=== Relegated from Second League ===
- Lokomotiv Gorna Oryahovitsa
- Vitosha

== North-East Group ==
North-East Third League
- Season: 2021–22

=== Stadia and Locations ===
Locations of teams in the 2021−22 North-East Third League

Team	City	Stadium	Capacity
Botev	Novi Pazar	Gradski	8,000
Chernolomets Popovo	Popovo	Stamo Kostov Stadium	5,000
Dorostol Silistra	Silistra	Louis Eyer Stadium	12,000
Dunav Ruse	Rousse	Gradski Stadion	13,000
Kubrat	Kubrat	Gradski	6,000
Lokomotiv	Rousse	Gradski Stadion	13,000
Ludogorets III	Razgrad	Eagles' Nest	2,000
Riltsi	Dobrich	Druzhba	12,500
Septemvri	Tervel	Septemvri	700
Spartak II	Varna	Spartak	6,000
Sportist GT	General Toshevo	Sportist	6,000
Svetkavitsa	Targovishte	Dimitar Burkov	5,000
Ustrem	Donchevo	Donchevo Stadium	1,000
Volov	Shumen	Panayot Volov Stadium	24,390

=== League table ===
Pos	Team	Pld	W	D	L	GF	GA	GD	Pts	Promotion or relegation
1	Dunav Ruse (P)	26	23	3	0	87	15	+72	72	Promotion to Second League
2	Chernolomets Popovo	26	19	1	6	59	17	+42	58	
3	Ludogorets III	26	17	4	5	66	16	+50	55	
4	Chernomorets Balchik	26	15	8	3	53	17	+36	53	
5	Septemvri Tervel	26	14	9	3	49	15	+34	51	
6	Svetkavitsa Targovishte	26	10	7	9	44	30	+14	37	
7	Spartak Varna II	26	9	6	11	40	34	+6	33 (Note: Botev Novi Pazar 1–0 Spartak Varna II; Spartak Varna II 7–0 Botev Novi Pazar)	
8	Botev Novi Pazar	26	9	6	11	23	41	−18	33	
9	Volov Shumen	26	8	8	10	33	41	−8	32	
10	Ustrem Donchevo	26	7	6	13	37	51	−14	27	
11	Riltsi	26	6	3	17	28	69	−41	21	
12	Sportist General Toshevo	26	5	5	16	27	86	−59	20	
13	Dorostol Silistra	26	4	4	18	29	66	−37	16	
14	Lokomotiv Ruse (Note: On 23 March 2022 Lokomotiv Ruse were expelled by the Executive Committee of the Bulgarian Football Union due to administrative violations. The team's results until that point were kept, and all fixtures until the end of the season would result in a 3–0 awarded win for their opponents.) (R, D)	26	0	2	24	7	84	−77	2	Relegation to Regional Divisions

Source: bulgarian-football.com, Soccerway
Rules for classification: 1) Points; 2) Head-to-head points; 3) Head-to-head goal difference; 4) Head-to-head goals scored; 5) Head-to-head away goals scored (only if two teams); 6) Goal difference; 7) Goals scored; 8) Fairplay ranking; 9) Draw.
(D) Disqualified; (P) Promoted; (R) Relegated

== South-East Group ==
South-East Third League
- Season: 2021-22

=== Stadia and Locations ===
Location of teams in 2021–22 South-East Third League

Team	City	Stadium	Capacity
Asenovets	Asenovgrad	Shipka Stadium	4,000
Atletik	Kuklen	Atletik	1,000
Beroe II	Stara Zagora	Lokomotiv Stadium	10,000
Borislav	Parvomay	Gradski	8,000
Chernomorets	Burgas	Chernomorets Stadium	22,000
Dimitrovgrad	Dimitrovgrad	Minyor	10,000
Gigant	Saedinenie	Saedinenie	5,000
Karnobat	Karnobat	Gradski	3,000
FC Krumovgrad	Krumovgrad	SK Krumovgrad	
Levski	Karlovo	Vasil Levski	3,000
Lokomotiv II	Plovdiv	Lokomotiv	13,220
Nesebar	Nesebar	Stadion Nesebar	6,800
Rodopa	Smolyan	Septemvri Stadium	6,100
Rozova Dolina	Kazanlak	Sevtopolis	15,000
Sayana	Haskovo	Stadium Dimitar Kanev	9,000
Sokol	Markovo	Sokol	2,500
FC Yambol	Yambol	Tundzha	18,000
Zagorets	Nova Zagora	Zagorets	5,900

=== League table ===
Pos	Team	Pld	W	D	L	GF	GA	GD	Pts	Promotion or relegation
1	FC Krumovgrad (P)	34	27	5	2	112	16	+96	86	Promotion to Second League
2	Sayana Haskovo	34	22	8	4	65	17	+48	74	
3	Zagorets	34	22	2	10	70	30	+40	68	
4	Chernomorets Burgas	34	19	10	5	53	28	+25	67	
5	Asenovets	34	18	8	8	61	45	+16	62	
6	Nesebar	34	17	4	13	61	46	+15	55	
7	Levski Karlovo	34	16	5	13	47	41	+6	53	
8	Rodopa Smolyan	34	14	8	12	47	39	+8	50	
9	Gigant Saedinenie	34	13	7	14	35	39	−4	46	
10	Dimitrovgrad	34	13	6	15	41	47	−6	45	
11	Atletik Kuklen	34	10	9	15	39	55	−16	39	
12	Rozova Dolina	34	11	4	19	50	68	−18	37	
13	Lokomotiv Plovdiv II	34	9	7	18	42	54	−12	34	
14	Karnobat	34	9	5	20	36	79	−43	32	
15	Sokol Markovo	34	8	6	20	38	74	−36	30	
16	Beroe Stara Zagora II	34	8	5	21	38	69	−31	29 (Note: Beroe Stara Zagora II 3−0 Borislav Parvomay; Borislav Parvomay 1−1 Beroe Stara Zagora II)	
17	Borislav Parvomay	34	8	5	21	45	84	−39	29	
18	Yambol (Note: On 23 March 2022 Yambol were expelled by the Executive Committee of the Bulgarian Football Union due to administrative violations. The team's results until that point were kept, and all fixtures until the end of the season would result in a 3–0 awarded win for their opponents. Yambol was later readmitted for the 2022-23 season.) (R, D)	34	6	8	20	18	67	−49	26	Relegation to Regional Divisions

Source: bulgarian-football.com, Soccerway
Rules for classification: 1) Points; 2) Head-to-head points; 3) Head-to-head goal difference; 4) Head-to-head goals scored; 5) Head-to-head away goals scored (only if two teams); 6) Goal difference; 7) Goals scored; 8) Fairplay ranking; 9) Draw.
(D) Disqualified; (P) Promoted; (R) Relegated

== North-West Group ==
North-West Third League
- Season: 2021-22

=== Stadia and locations ===
Location of teams in 2021–22 North-West Third League

Team	City	Stadium	Capacity
Akademik	Svishtov	Akademik	13,500
Bdin	Vidin	Georgi Benkovski	15,000
Botev II	Vratsa	Hristo Botev	25,000
Drenovets	Drenovets	Arena Drenovets	
Etar II	Veliko Tarnovo	Ivaylo	15,000
Juventus	Malchika	Georgi Karchev	1,000
Levski	Levski	Levski	6,000
Lokomotiv	Dryanovo	Lokomotiv	3,500
Lokomotiv	Gorna Oryahovitsa	Lokomotiv	10,500
Lokomotiv	Mezdra	Lokomotiv	5,000
Partizan	Cherven Bryag	Gradski	700
Pavlikeni	Pavlikeni	Gancho Panov	10,000
Peshtera	Galata	Svilen Mladenov	
Sevlievo	Sevlievo	Rakovski	5,000
Spartak	Pleven	Pleven	22,000
Vihar	Slavyanovo	Gradski	1,000
Yantra Polski Trambesh	Polski Trambesh	Gradski	800

=== League table ===
Pos	Team	Pld	W	D	L	GF	GA	GD	Pts	Promotion or relegation
1	Spartak Pleven (P)	32	26	3	3	89	19	+70	81	Promotion to Second League
2	Sevlievo	32	23	4	5	64	22	+42	73	
3	Lokomotiv Gorna Oryahovitsa	32	22	3	7	70	31	+39	69	
4	Bdin Vidin (Note: On 7 September 2021 Bdin Vidin received a three-point deduction and a 0−3 awarded loss for not showing up for their away game against Peshtera Galata.)	32	20	2	10	65	26	+39	59 (Note: Vihar Slavyanovo 0−2 Bdin Vidin; Bdin Vidin 0−0 Vihar Slavyanovo)	
5	Vihar Slavyanovo	32	18	5	9	56	31	+25	59	
6	Yantra Polski Trambesh	32	15	7	10	47	41	+6	52 (Note: Yantra Polski Trambesh 5−0 Partizan Cherven Bryag; Partizan Cherven Bryag 4−1 Yantra Polski Trambesh)	
7	Partizan Cherven Bryag	32	16	4	12	49	50	−1	52	
8	Pavlikeni	32	14	9	9	48	33	+15	51	
9	Levski 2007	32	11	7	14	41	47	−6	40	
10	Botev Vratsa II	32	10	6	16	30	47	−17	36	
11	Drenovets	32	11	2	19	39	66	−27	35	
12	Akademik Svishtov	32	10	3	19	43	56	−13	33	
13	Lokomotiv Mezdra	32	8	8	16	35	47	−12	32	
14	Juventus Malchika	32	7	7	18	30	64	−34	28	
15	Lokomotiv Dryanovo	32	8	3	21	33	63	−30	27	
16	Etar Veliko Tarnovo II	32	7	3	22	46	90	−44	24	
17	Peshtera Galata (Note: Peshtera Galata declined further participation on 24 March 2022. The team's results until that point were kept, and all fixtures until the end of the season would result in a 3–0 awarded win for their opponents.) (R, D)	32	7	2	23	26	78	−52	23	Relegation to Regional Divisions

Source: bulgarian-football.com, Soccerway
Rules for classification: 1) Points; 2) Head-to-head points; 3) Head-to-head goal difference; 4) Head-to-head goals scored; 5) Head-to-head away goals scored (only if two teams); 6) Goal difference; 7) Goals scored; 8) Fairplay ranking; 9) Draw.
(D) Disqualified; (P) Promoted; (R) Relegated

== South-West Group ==
South-West Third League
- Season: 2021-22

=== Stadia and locations ===
Location of teams in 2021–22 South-West Third League

Team	City	Stadium	Capacity
Balkan	Botevgrad	Hristo Botev	8,000
Bansko	Bansko	Saint Peter	3,000
Belasitsa	Petrich	Tsar Samuil	9,500
Botev	Ihtiman	Hristo Botev	5,000
Chavdar	Etropole	Chavdar	5,600
Granit	Vladaya	Granit	
Hebar II	Pazardzhik	Georgi Benkovski	13,128
Kostinbrod	Kostinbrod	Georgi Benkovski	
Kyustendil	Kyustendil	Osogovo	10,000
Levski	Chepintsi	Levski	
Nadezhda	Dobroslavtsi	Dobroslavtsi	
Oborishte	Panagyurishte	Orcho Voyvoda	3,000
Pirin 1912	Gotse Delchev	Gradski	5,000
Pirin II	Rila	Rila	500
Pirin Razlog	Razlog	Gradski	6,500
Rilski Sportist	Samokov	Iskar	7,000
Septemvri II	Sofia	German	800
Slivnishki Geroy	Slivnitsa	Slivnishki Geroy	7,000
Vihren	Sandanski	Sandanski	6,000
Vitosha Bistritsa	Bistritsa	Stadion Bistritsa	2,500

=== League table ===
Pos	Team	Pld	W	D	L	GF	GA	GD	Pts	Promotion or relegation
1	Belasitsa Petrich (P)	38	28	4	6	90	26	+64	88	Promotion to Second League
2	Vitosha Bistritsa (P)	38	24	9	5	81	25	+56	81	Promotion to Second League
3	Chavdar Etropole	38	24	8	6	70	20	+50	80 (Note: Chavdar Etropole 2−0 Kyustendil; Kyustendil 0−1 Chavdar Etropole)	
4	Kyustendil	38	24	8	6	75	26	+49	80	
5	Oborishte	38	23	5	10	69	51	+18	74	
6	Balkan Botevgrad	38	21	8	9	62	38	+24	71	
7	Bansko	38	19	11	8	56	36	+20	68	
8	Pirin Gotse Delchev	38	14	9	15	48	51	−3	51	
9	Granit Vladaya	38	14	6	18	40	60	−20	48 (Note: Rilski Sportist 2−3 Granit Vladaya; Granit Vladaya 2−2 Rilski Sportist)	
10	Rilski Sportist	38	14	6	18	56	64	−8	48	
11	Pirin Razlog	38	11	14	13	49	50	−1	47	
12	Kostinbrod	38	12	10	16	44	53	−9	46 (Note: Nadezhda Dobroslavtsi 1−1 Kostinbrod; Kostinbrod 4−0 Nadezhda Dobroslavtsi)	
13	Nadezhda Dobroslavtsi	38	12	10	16	50	62	−12	46	
14	Septemvri Sofia II	38	14	3	21	64	77	−13	45	
15	Slivnishki Geroy	38	12	8	18	44	47	−3	44	
16	Botev Ihtiman	38	12	7	19	40	55	−15	43 (Note: Botev Ihtiman 2−1 Vihren Sandanski; Vihren Sandanski 1−1 Botev Ihtiman)	
17	Vihren Sandanski	38	12	7	19	58	70	−12	43	
18	Hebar Pazardzhik II (R)	38	11	8	19	43	56	−13	41	Relegation to Regional Divisions
19	Pirin Blagoevgrad II (R)	38	3	8	27	24	82	−58	17	Relegation to Regional Divisions
20	Levski Chepintsi (R)	38	0	3	35	17	131	−114	3	Relegation to Regional Divisions

Source: bulgarian-football.com, Soccerway
Rules for classification: 1) Points; 2) Head-to-head points; 3) Head-to-head goal difference; 4) Head-to-head goals scored; 5) Head-to-head away goals scored (only if two teams); 6) Goal difference; 7) Goals scored; 8) Fairplay ranking; 9) Draw.
(P) Promoted; (R) Relegated
