= 2024–25 First Professional Football League (Bulgaria) =

101st season of top-tier football league in Bulgaria

First Professional Football League
- Season: 2024–25
- Dates: 19 July 2024 – 31 May 2025
- Champions: Ludogorets Razgrad (14th title)
- Relegated: Hebar; Krumovgrad
- Champions League: Ludogorets Razgrad
- Europa League: Levski Sofia
- Conference League: Arda; Cherno More
- Matches: 295
- Goals: 721 (2.44 per match)
- Top goalscorer: Santiago Godoy (18 goals)
- Best goalkeeper: Plamen Iliev (14 clean sheets)
- Biggest home win: Septemvri Sofia 6–1 Hebar (10 March 2025); Arda 5–0 Lokomotiv Sofia (13 April 2025); CSKA Sofia 5–0 Spartak Varna (13 May 2025)
- Biggest away win: Beroe 0–6 Botev Plovdiv (14 May 2025)
- Highest scoring: Lokomotiv Sofia 1–6 Levski Sofia (20 July 2024); Septemvri Sofia 6–1 Hebar (10 March 2025)
- Longest winning run: 9 games Ludogorets Razgrad
- Longest unbeaten run: 19 games Ludogorets Razgrad
- Longest winless run: 17 games Hebar
- Longest losing run: 6 games Septemvri Sofia

The 2024–25 First Professional Football League, also known as efbet League for sponsorship reasons, was the 101st season of the top division of the Bulgarian football league system, the 77th since a league format was adopted for the national competition of A Group as a top tier of the pyramid, and also the 9th season of the First Professional Football League, which decides the Bulgarian champion. The season began on 19 July 2024 and finished on 31 May 2025.

Ludogorets Razgrad were the 13-time defending champions and successfully defended the title, winning it for a record-extending fourteenth consecutive time.

== Teams ==
As in the last season, 16 teams will compete in the league this year. Two teams were promoted from the 2023–24 Second League, and another place is for the winner of the promotion/relegation playoff.

The first team to earn promotion from the Second League was Spartak Varna, who mathematically secured a top two finish after Marek lost to Sportist Svoge on 3 May. Spartak return to the top level after 1-year absence.

The second team to earn promotion from the Second League was Septemvri Sofia, who mathematically secured a top two finish after winning against Chernomorets Balchik on the last matchday of the season. Septemvri return to the top level also after a 1-year absence.

Additionally, Botev Vratsa managed to defeat Marek with a score of 4–2 after penalties in the promotion/relegation playoff, thus remaining in the First League.

=== Stadia and locations ===
Arda	Beroe	Botev Plovdiv	Botev Vratsa
Arena Arda	Stadion Beroe	Stadion Hristo Botev	Stadion Hristo Botev
Capacity: 12,000	Capacity: 12,000	Capacity: 18,777	Capacity: 25,000
Cherno More	CSKA 1948	CSKA Sofia	Hebar
Stadion Ticha	Stadion Bistritsa	Vasil Levski National Stadium	Stadion Georgi Benkovski
Capacity: 12,000	Capacity: 4,000	Capacity: 45,000	Capacity: 13,000
Krumovgrad	Location of teams in 2024–25 First League Sofia 2024–25 First League football clubs		Levski Sofia
Nikola Shterev - Starika Sports Complex	Location of teams in 2024–25 First League Sofia 2024–25 First League football clubs		Stadion Georgi Asparuhov
Capacity: 3,000	Location of teams in 2024–25 First League Sofia 2024–25 First League football clubs		Capacity: 18,000
Lokomotiv Plovdiv	Location of teams in 2024–25 First League Sofia 2024–25 First League football clubs		Lokomotiv Sofia
Stadion Lokomotiv	Location of teams in 2024–25 First League Sofia 2024–25 First League football clubs		Stadion Lokomotiv
Capacity: 10,000	Location of teams in 2024–25 First League Sofia 2024–25 First League football clubs		Capacity: 22,000
Ludogorets Razgrad	Septemvri Sofia	Slavia Sofia	Spartak Varna
Huvepharma Arena	Stadion Lokomotiv	Stadion Aleksandar Shalamanov	Stadion Spartak
Capacity: 10,500	Capacity: 22,000	Capacity: 25,000	Capacity: 10,000

=== Personnel and kits ===
Note: Flags indicate national team as has been defined under FIFA eligibility rules. Players and managers may hold more than one non-FIFA nationality.

Team	Manager	Captain	Kit manufacturer	Shirt sponsor	Additional
Arda	(Bulgaria) Aleksandar Tunchev	(Bulgaria) Anatoli Gospodinov	Uhlsport	efbet	IK Nataliya Ltd.
Beroe	(Bulgaria) Plamen Lipenski (interim)	(Argentina) Franco Ramos Mingo	Nike	8888.bg	—
Botev Plovdiv	(Bosnia and Herzegovina) Dušan Kerkez	(Bulgaria) Ivelin Popov	Macron	WinBet	Bitcoin
Botev Vratsa	(Bulgaria) Hristo Yanev	(Bulgaria) Daniel Genov	Erima	WinBet	Vratsa Municipality, Inex, Predsednik Ltd.
Cherno More	(Bulgaria) Ilian Iliev	(Bulgaria) Daniel Dimov	Macron	Armeets	—
CSKA 1948	(Bulgaria) Ivan Stoyanov	(Bulgaria) Radoslav Kirilov	Puma	efbet	Bachkovo
CSKA Sofia	(Bulgaria) Aleksandar Tomash	(Scotland) Liam Cooper	Macron	WinBet	A1
Hebar	(Bulgaria) Velislav Vutsov	(Slovakia) Róbert Mazáň	Erima	efbet	—
Krumovgrad	(Bulgaria) Rosen Kirilov	(Bulgaria) Yanko Georgiev	Uhlsport	Compass Cargo Airlines	Bethub
Levski Sofia	(Spain) Julio Velázquez	(Brazil) Wenderson Tsunami	Adidas	PalmsBet	CT Interactive, Lacrima
Lokomotiv Plovdiv	(Slovenia) Dušan Kosič	(Bulgaria) Dimitar Iliev	Joma	WinBet	General Broker Club
Lokomotiv Sofia	(Serbia) Ratko Dostanić	(Bulgaria) Aleksandar Lyubenov	Joma	8888.bg	VIA 2000
Ludogorets Razgrad	(Croatia) Igor Jovićević	(Bulgaria) Anton Nedyalkov	Jako	efbet	Vivacom, Huvepharma, Navibulgar
Septemvri Sofia	(Bulgaria) Nikolay Mitov	(Bulgaria) Asen Chandarov	Uhlsport	8888.bg	—
Slavia Sofia	(Bulgaria) Zlatomir Zagorčić	(Bulgaria) Georgi Petkov	Zeus	bet365	Asset Insurance, SportRespect
Spartak Varna	(Bulgaria) Nikolay Kirov	(Bulgaria) Viktor Mitev	Nike	efbet	Intercom Group, Mussala Insurance Broker, 100 Tona

Note: Individual clubs may wear jerseys with advertising. However, only one sponsorship is permitted per jersey for official tournaments organised by UEFA in addition to that of the kit manufacturer (exceptions are made for non-profit organisations). Clubs in the domestic league can have more than one sponsorship per jersey which can feature on the front of the shirt, incorporated with the main sponsor or in place of it; or on the back, either below the squad number or on the collar area. Shorts also have space available for advertisement.

=== Managerial changes ===
Team	Outgoing manager	Manner of departure	Date of vacancy	Position in table	Incoming manager	Date of appointment
Ludogorets Razgrad	(Bulgaria) Georgi Dermendzhiev	Resigned	15 August 2024	8th	(Bulgaria) Zahari Sirakov (interim)	15 August 2024
Spartak Varna	(Bulgaria) Aleksandar Tomash	Mutual agreement	28 August 2024	3rd	(Bulgaria) Ivan Tsvetanov (interim)	28 August 2024
CSKA Sofia	(Croatia) Tomislav Stipić	Sacked	28 August 2024	13th	(Bulgaria) Aleksandar Tomash	28 August 2024
Botev Vratsa	(Bulgaria) Todor Yanchev	Sacked	1 September 2024	13th	(Bulgaria) Hristo Yanev	6 September 2024
Spartak Varna	(Bulgaria) Ivan Tsvetanov	End of interim spell	5 September 2024	3rd	(Greece) Kyriakos Georgiou	5 September 2024
Ludogorets Razgrad	(Bulgaria) Zahari Sirakov	End of interim spell	26 September 2024	1st	(Croatia) Igor Jovićević	26 September 2024
Spartak Varna	(Greece) Kyriakos Georgiou	Resigned	28 September 2024	5th	(Bulgaria) Ivan Tsvetanov (interim)	12 October 2024
Lokomotiv Sofia	(Bulgaria) Ivan Kolev	Mutual agreement	30 September 2024	12th	(Bulgaria) Anton Velkov	30 September 2024
Beroe	(Argentina) José Acciari	Mutual agreement	30 September 2024	8th	(Spain) Josu Uribe	3 October 2024
Hebar	(Bulgaria) Veselin Velikov	Mutual agreement	1 October 2024	16th	(Bulgaria) Yordan Minev (interim)	12 October 2024
Lokomotiv Plovdiv	(Bulgaria) Lyuboslav Penev	Mutual agreement	11 October 2024	10th	(Bulgaria) Hristo Zlatinski (interim)	11 October 2024
Hebar	(Bulgaria) Yordan Minev	End of interim spell	16 October 2024	16th	(Bosnia and Herzegovina) Bruno Akrapović	16 October 2024
Spartak Varna	(Bulgaria) Ivan Tsvetanov	End of interim spell	20 October 2024	5th	(Bulgaria) Nikolay Kirov	20 October 2024
CSKA 1948	(Bulgaria) Valentin Iliev	Sacked	30 October 2024	9th	(Bulgaria) Ivan Ivanov	30 October 2024
Lokomotiv Plovdiv	(Bulgaria) Hristo Zlatinski	End of interim spell	7 December 2024	14th	(Bulgaria) Vasil Garkov (interim)	7 December 2024
Levski Sofia	(Bulgaria) Stanislav Genchev	Mutual agreement	16 December 2024	4th	(Spain) Julio Velázquez	6 January 2025
Lokomotiv Plovdiv	(Bulgaria) Vasil Garkov (interim)	End of interim spell	19 December 2024	14th	(Slovenia) Dušan Kosič	19 December 2024
CSKA 1948	(Bulgaria) Ivan Ivanov	Sacked	18 February 2025	12th	(Bulgaria) Borislav Kyosev	20 February 2025
Krumovgrad	(Bulgaria) Atanas Ribarski	Sacked	4 March 2025	14th	(Bulgaria) Miroslav Kosev	4 March 2025
Hebar	(Bosnia and Herzegovina) Bruno Akrapović	Mutual agreement	11 March 2025	16th	(Bulgaria) Yordan Cholov (interim)	11 March 2025
Hebar	(Bulgaria) Yordan Cholov	End of interim spell	17 March 2025	16th	(Bulgaria) Velislav Vutsov	17 March 2025
Lokomotiv Sofia	(Bulgaria) Anton Velkov	Resigned	17 March 2025	14th	(Serbia) Ratko Dostanić	21 March 2025
CSKA 1948	(Bulgaria) Borislav Kyosev	Sacked	4 April 2025	10th	(Bulgaria) Aleksandar Aleksandrov	4 April 2025
Krumovgrad	(Bulgaria) Miroslav Kosev	Sacked	5 April 2025	14th	(Bulgaria) Rosen Kirilov	5 April 2025
CSKA 1948	(Bulgaria) Aleksandar Aleksandrov	Mutual agreement	30 April 2025	10th	(Bulgaria) Ivan Stoyanov	30 April 2025
Beroe	(Spain) Josu Uribe	Sacked	16 May 2025	8th	(Bulgaria) Plamen Lipenski (interim)	16 May 2025

== Regular season ==
=== League table ===
Pos	Team	Pld	W	D	L	GF	GA	GD	Pts	Qualification
1	Ludogorets Razgrad	30	24	4	2	62	14	+48	76	Qualification for the Championship group
2	Levski Sofia	30	19	5	6	55	25	+30	62	Qualification for the Championship group
3	Arda	30	15	8	7	49	33	+16	53 (Note: Head-to-head points: Arda 4; Cherno More 1.)	Qualification for the Championship group
4	Cherno More	30	14	11	5	41	25	+16	53	Qualification for the Championship group
5	Botev Plovdiv	30	14	7	9	32	31	+1	49	Qualification for the Conference League group
6	Spartak Varna	30	14	6	10	39	38	+1	48	Qualification for the Conference League group
7	CSKA Sofia	30	13	8	9	40	27	+13	47	Qualification for the Conference League group
8	Beroe	30	12	6	12	34	29	+5	42 (Note: Head-to-head away goals: Beroe 1; Slavia Sofia 0.)	Qualification for the Conference League group
9	Slavia Sofia	30	12	6	12	43	42	+1	42	Qualification for the Relegation group
10	CSKA 1948	30	8	10	12	38	44	−6	34	Qualification for the Relegation group
11	Septemvri Sofia	30	10	3	17	32	47	−15	33	Qualification for the Relegation group
12	Lokomotiv Sofia	30	8	6	16	29	49	−20	30 (Note: Head-to-head points: Lokomotiv Sofia 4; Krumovgrad 1.)	Qualification for the Relegation group
13	Krumovgrad	30	7	9	14	16	31	−15	30	Qualification for the Relegation group
14	Lokomotiv Plovdiv	30	7	7	16	27	40	−13	28	Qualification for the Relegation group
15	Botev Vratsa	30	5	6	19	24	57	−33	21	Qualification for the Relegation group
16	Hebar	30	3	8	19	23	52	−29	17	Qualification for the Relegation group

Source: soccerway, Bulgarian Football
Rules for classification: 1) Points; 2) Head-to-head points; 3) Head-to-head goal difference; 4) Head-to-head goals scored; 5) Head-to-head away goals scored (only if two teams); 6) Goal difference; 7) Goals scored; 8) Fairplay ranking; 9) Draw

=== Results ===
Home \ Away	ARD	BER	BPD	BVR	CHM	CSK	CSS	HEB	KRU	LEV	LPD	LSO	LUD	SEP	SLA	SPV
Arda	—	1–1	1–0	2–0	4–0	1–0	2–1	2–1	1–0	1–1	4–2	5–0	0–4	2–1	1–1	2–2
Beroe	1–4	—	0–1	5–1	0–1	2–0	0–2	2–1	0–0	0–1	0–2	0–0	0–1	2–0	1–0	3–0
Botev Plovdiv	1–1	0–0	—	3–1	1–0	0–5	0–3	1–1	1–0	1–0	2–2	2–0	2–4	3–0	1–0	0–1
Botev Vratsa	3–1	1–2	1–3	—	2–3	0–3	1–1	1–0	0–0	0–2	0–0	0–3	0–2	2–0	3–2	1–1
Cherno More	1–1	1–1	1–1	2–1	—	0–0	0–0	1–0	3–0	2–1	1–2	4–0	1–1	2–0	1–1	1–1
CSKA 1948	1–2	1–1	0–1	1–0	0–4	—	1–3	1–3	4–1	2–4	2–1	1–4	1–3	2–0	2–0	2–2
CSKA Sofia	2–0	1–0	0–1	2–0	1–1	2–2	—	3–1	2–2	2–2	2–0	1–0	2–2	0–1	0–1	3–1
Hebar	0–2	3–1	0–1	1–1	0–1	1–1	0–1	—	0–0	1–4	0–0	2–1	0–2	1–2	1–1	0–2
Krumovgrad	0–0	0–1	0–1	3–0	1–1	1–1	1–0	1–0	—	0–2	0–0	0–2	0–3	2–0	1–0	0–1
Levski Sofia	2–1	0–2	1–1	4–0	1–2	2–0	1–0	1–0	3–0	—	2–1	2–0	2–1	2–3	3–3	2–0
Lokomotiv Plovdiv	1–0	1–2	0–1	1–0	1–2	0–2	2–2	3–3	0–2	0–2	—	1–1	1–0	0–1	0–1	1–2
Lokomotiv Sofia	0–2	2–1	1–1	0–1	2–1	0–0	0–3	0–0	0–0	1–6	0–1	—	1–2	1–2	3–2	2–1
Ludogorets Razgrad	5–1	2–1	3–0	3–0	0–0	3–0	1–0	3–0	3–0	1–0	1–0	2–0	—	0–0	2–0	2–1
Septemvri Sofia	0–4	0–1	1–0	2–2	1–2	1–1	0–1	6–1	1–0	0–1	2–3	0–1	0–2	—	3–2	0–1
Slavia Sofia	1–1	2–1	3–2	4–2	1–0	1–1	1–0	3–2	0–1	0–1	2–1	3–2	0–1	2–3	—	3–1
Spartak Varna	1–0	0–3	1–0	1–0	0–2	1–1	3–0	4–0	1–0	0–0	1–0	3–2	1–3	4–2	1–3	—

Source: Bulgarian Football
Legend: Blue = home team win; Yellow = draw; Red = away team win.
For upcoming matches, an "a" indicates there is an article about the rivalry between the two participants.

== Championship round ==
Points and goals carried over in full from regular season.

Pos	Team	Pld	W	D	L	GF	GA	GD	Pts	Qualification	LUD	LEV	CHM	ARD
1	Ludogorets Razgrad (C)	36	25	8	3	70	22	+48	83	Qualification for the Champions League first qualifying round	—	1–1	2–0	2–2
2	Levski Sofia	36	21	9	6	64	29	+35	72	Qualification for the Europa League first qualifying round (Note: As Ludogorets Razgrad won the 2024–25 Bulgarian Cup, the cup's Europa League first qualifying round berth was passed to the second-placed team in the First League.)	2–2	—	2–0	1–1
3	Cherno More	36	15	14	7	44	30	+14	59	Qualification for the Conference League second qualifying round	2–0	0–0	—	1–1
4	Arda (O)	36	15	13	8	54	41	+13	58	Qualification for the Conference League play-off	1–1	0–3	0–0	—

Source: soccerway, Bulgarian Football
Legend: Blue = home team win; Yellow = draw; Red = away team win.
Rules for classification: 1) Points; 2) Head-to-head points; 3) Head-to-head goal difference; 4) Head-to-head goals scored; 5) Head-to-head away goals scored (only if two teams); 6) Goal difference; 7) Goals scored; 8) Fairplay ranking; 9) Draw
(C) Champions; (O) Play-off winners

== Conference League round ==
Points and goals carried over in full from regular season.

Pos	Team	Pld	W	D	L	GF	GA	GD	Pts	Qualification	CSS	BPD	SPV	BER
1	CSKA Sofia	36	19	8	9	58	28	+30	65	Qualification for the Conference League play-off	—	3–0	5–0	2–1
2	Botev Plovdiv	36	16	8	12	43	43	0	56		0–4	—	3–2	1–1
3	Spartak Varna	36	15	6	15	45	53	−8	51		0–1	2–1	—	1–2
4	Beroe	36	14	7	15	41	43	−2	49		0–3	0–6	3–1	—

Source: soccerway, Bulgarian Football
Legend: Blue = home team win; Yellow = draw; Red = away team win.
Rules for classification: 1) Points; 2) Head-to-head points; 3) Head-to-head goal difference; 4) Head-to-head goals scored; 5) Head-to-head away goals scored (only if two teams); 6) Goal difference; 7) Goals scored; 8) Fairplay ranking; 9) Draw

== Relegation round ==
Points and goals carried over in full from regular season.

Pos	Team	Pld	W	D	L	GF	GA	GD	Pts	Qualification or relegation	SLA	LSO	CSK	SEP	LPD	BVR	KRU	HEB
1	Slavia Sofia	37	14	7	16	50	52	−2	49		—	0–0	0–1	—	1–2	—	—	3–2
2	Lokomotiv Sofia	37	13	8	16	43	51	−8	47 (Note: Head-to-head points: Lokomotiv Sofia 4; CSKA 1948 1.)		—	—	2–1	—	—	3–0	3–0	3–0
3	CSKA 1948	37	12	11	14	45	47	−2	47		—	—	—	2–0	—	0–1	2–0	0–0
4	Septemvri Sofia	37	14	3	20	42	56	−14	45		3–1	0–2	—	—	2–0	—	—	1–0
5	Lokomotiv Plovdiv (O)	37	10	8	19	37	49	−12	38	Qualification for the relegation play-off	—	1–1	0–1	—	—	1–3	—	—
6	Botev Vratsa (O)	37	10	6	21	34	65	−31	36	Qualification for the relegation play-off	2–1	—	—	3–2	—	—	1–0	—
7	Krumovgrad (R)	37	8	9	20	20	45	−25	33	Relegation to the Second League	0–1	—	—	1–2	0–4	—	—	—
8	Hebar (R)	37	4	9	24	28	64	−36	21	Relegation to the Second League	—	—	—	—	1–2	1–0	1–3	—

Source: Soccerway, Bulgarian Football
Legend: Blue = home team win; Yellow = draw; Red = away team win.
Rules for classification: 1) Points; 2) Head-to-head points (only in regular season); 3) Head-to-head goal difference (only in regular season); 4) Head-to-head goals scored (only in regular season); 5) Head-to-head away goals scored (only if two teams and only in regular season); 6) Goal difference; 7) Goals scored; 8) Fairplay ranking; 9) Draw
(O) Play-off winners; (R) Relegated

== Conference League play-off ==
31 May 2025
18:30 EEST

Arda	1–1 (a.e.t.)	CSKA Sofia
Shinyashiki 90+2'	Report	Vion 50'
Penalties
Offor (penalty scored); Yusein (penalty scored); Kotev (penalty scored); Idowu (penalty scored)	4–1	(penalty scored) Pittas; (penalty missed) Sanyang; (penalty missed) Eto'o

Arena Arda, Kardzhali
Attendance: N/A
Referee: Radoslav Gidzhenov (Plovdiv)

== Promotion/relegation play-offs ==
29 May 2025
19:00 EEST

Botev Vratsa	1–0	Pirin Blagoevgrad
Genov 38'	Report

Stadion Hristo Botev, Vratsa
Attendance: 2,218
Referee: Volen Chinkov (Sofia)
30 May 2025
19:00 EEST

Lokomotiv Plovdiv	3–0	Marek
Perea 25', 50'; Lamy 29'	Report

Stadion Lokomotiv, Plovdiv
Attendance: 3,422
Referee: Nikola Popov (Sofia)

== Season statistics ==
=== Top scorers ===
As of 31 May 2025

Rank	Player	Club	Goals
1	(Argentina) Santiago Godoy	Beroe	18
2	(Bulgaria) Ahmed Ahmedov	Spartak Varna	16
2	(Croatia) Ante Aralica	Lokomotiv Sofia	16
4	(Central African Republic) Goduine Koyalipou	CSKA Sofia	14
5	(Bulgaria) Borislav Rupanov	Septemvri Sofia	12
6	(Bulgaria) Stanislav Ivanov	Arda	11
6	(Bulgaria) Tonislav Yordanov	Arda	11
8	(Brazil) Rwan Cruz	Ludogorets Razgrad	10
8	(Bulgaria) Ivan Minchev	Slavia Sofia	10
8	(Bulgaria) Vladimir Nikolov	Slavia Sofia	10

=== Clean sheets ===
As of 31 May 2025

Rank	Goalkeeper	Club	Clean sheets
1	(Bulgaria) Plamen Iliev	Cherno More	14
2	(Denmark) Hans Christian Bernat	Botev Plovdiv	13
2	(Bulgaria) Yanko Georgiev	Krumovgrad	13
4	(Bulgaria) Petar Marinov	CSKA 1948	12
5	(Bulgaria) Anatoli Gospodinov	Arda	11
5	(Bulgaria) Aleksandar Lyubenov	Lokomotiv Sofia	11
5	(Brazil) Arthur Motta	Beroe	11
5	(Netherlands) Sergio Padt	Ludogorets Razgrad	11
5	(Bulgaria) Martin Velichkov	Spartak Varna	11
10	(Germany) Hendrik Bonmann	Ludogorets Razgrad	8

=== Hat-tricks ===
As of 31 May 2025

Player	For	Against	Result	Date
(Bulgaria) Ahmed Ahmedov	Spartak Varna	Hebar	4–0 (H)	22 November 2024
(Argentina) Santiago Godoy^{4}	Beroe	Botev Vratsa	5–1 (H)	4 December 2024
(Argentina) Santiago Godoy	Beroe	Spartak Varna	3–0 (A)	1 March 2025

Note

^{4} Player scored 4 goals

== Attendances ==
No.	Club	Average attendance	Change	Highest
1	Levski Sofia	8,192	-4,4%	31,948
2	Botev Plovdiv	4,215	-12,8%	14,035
3	CSKA Sofia	3,943	-36,5%	25,000
4	Cherno More Varna	2,295	-8,9%	8,000
5	Spartak Varna	1,991	-	6,500
6	Lokomotiv Plovdiv	1,975	-42,8%	6,500
7	Ludogorets Razgrad	1,627	-11,9%	6,000
8	Beroe Stara Zagora	1,197	9,5%	5,500
9	Arda Kardzhali	910	-23,1%	3,896
10	Botev Vratsa	881	6,0%	2,000
11	Hebar Pazardzhik	843	-60,6%	3,800
12	Slavia Sofia	735	82,7%	5,500
13	Lokomotiv Sofia	692	30,8%	4,300
14	Krumovgrad	385	-39,5%	1,300
15	Septemvri Sofia	298	-	2,000
16	CSKA 1948	200	-15,9%	550
