= 2024–25 FC Krumovgrad season =

FC Krumovgrad
2024–25 season
- First Professional Football League: Pre-season
- Bulgarian Cup: Pre-season

The 2024–25 season is the 100th season in the history of FC Krumovgrad, and the club's second consecutive season in the First Professional Football League. In addition to the domestic league, the team is scheduled to participate in the Bulgarian Cup.

== Competitions ==
=== Overall record ===
Competition	First match	Last match	Starting round	Record							
Competition	First match	Last match	Starting round	Pld	W	D	L	GF	GA	GD	Win %
First Professional Football League	19 July 2024		Matchday 1	1	1	0	0	1	0	+1	100.00
Bulgarian Cup				0	0	0	0	0	0	+0	—
Total				1	1	0	0	1	0	+1	100.00

Last updated: 19 July 2024
Source: Soccerway

=== First Professional Football League ===
==== League table ====
Pos	Team	Pld	W	D	L	GF	GA	GD	Pts	Qualification
10	CSKA 1948	25	7	10	8	32	33	−1	31	Qualification for the Relegation group
11	Septemvri Sofia	25	9	3	13	29	36	−7	30	Qualification for the Relegation group
12	Krumovgrad (Y)	25	5	9	11	13	23	−10	24 (Note: Head-to-head points: Krumovgrad 4, Lokomotiv Plovdiv 1.)	Qualification for the Relegation group
13	Lokomotiv Plovdiv (Y)	25	6	6	13	25	35	−10	24	Qualification for the Relegation group
14	Lokomotiv Sofia (Y)	25	6	5	14	23	39	−16	23	Qualification for the Relegation group

Updated to match(es) played on 16 March 2025. Source: soccerway, Bulgarian Football
Rules for classification: 1) Points; 2) Head-to-head points; 3) Head-to-head goal difference; 4) Head-to-head goals scored; 5) Head-to-head away goals scored (only if two teams); 6) Goal difference; 7) Goals scored; 8) Fairplay ranking; 9) Draw
(Y) Cannot qualify for Championship group, but may still qualify for Conference League group

==== Results summary ====
Overall								Home						Away					
Pld	W	D	L	GF	GA	GD	Pts	W	D	L	GF	GA	GD	W	D	L	GF	GA	GD
1	1	0	0	1	0	+1	3	1	0	0	1	0	+1	0	0	0	0	0	0

Last updated: 19 July 2024.

==== Results by round ====
Round	1	2
Ground	H	A
Result	W	
Position		

Updated to match(es) played on 19 July 2024. Source:
A = Away; H = Home; W = Win; D = Draw; L = Loss

==== Matches ====
The match schedule was released on 13 June 2024.

19 July 2024 1	Krumovgrad	1–0	Slavia Sofia	Plovdiv
21:15 UTC+3				Stadium: Nikola Shterev-Starika Complex

26 July 2024 2	Arda Kardzhali	v	Krumovgrad	Kardzhali
19:00 UTC+3
