= Dzhuneyt Yashar =

Bulgarian footballer

Personal information
- Full name: Dzhuneyt Refik Yashar
- Date of birth: 30 December 1985 (age 40)
- Place of birth: Asenovgrad, Bulgaria
- Height: 1.73 m (5 ft 8 in)
- Position: Central midfielder

Team information
- Current team: Asenovets

Senior career*
Years	Team	Apps	(Gls)
2004	Chernomorets Burgas	1	(0)
2005	Chavdar BS	27	(2)
2006–2008	Kaliakra	30	(6)
2008–2009	Levski Sofia	0	(0)
2009	→ Kaliakra (loan)	12	(4)
2009–2010	Slavia Sofia	9	(0)
2010–2011	Nesebar	22	(2)
2011–2014	Kaliakra	72	(4)
2014–2016	Vereya	53	(8)
2016–2017	Nesebar	24	(4)
2017–2018	Maritsa Plovdiv	24	(4)
2018	Nesebar	14	(3)
2019–2020	Botev Galabovo	29	(1)
2020–2021	Lokomotiv GO	24	(2)
2021–2024	Krumovgrad	59	(17)
2025–	Asenovets	24	(2)

Managerial career
- 2026–: Asenovets
- * Club domestic league appearances and goals as of 15 June 2024

Dzhuneyt Yashar (Bulgarian: Джунейт Яшар; born 30 December 1985) is a Bulgarian footballer and manager who plays for and manages Asenovets.

== Career ==
He had trained at Levski Sofia's Youth Academy as a young player.

=== Kaliakra ===
Between 2006 and 2008, Yashar played Kaliakra Kavarna for two years before he eventually joined Levski Sofia.

=== Levski Sofia ===
He made his unofficial debut for Levski on 5 July 2008 in a friendly match against Spartak Pleven. Levski won the match and the result was 5:0. However, Yashar who was brought to Levski Sofia by Velislav Vutsov, did not fit new manager Emil Velev's vision for the team. It was announced that he will be bought by OFC Sliven 2000 on 8 January 2009. However, the transfer didn't materialize, so Yashar was loaned out to his ex-team PFC Kaliakra Kavarna for six months, where he was capped 12 times and scored 4 goals.

=== Slavia Sofia ===
On 25 June 2009, it was announced that Yashar will join PFC Slavia Sofia under the coaching of his former coach Velislav Vutsov. He made his A PFG debut for the club on 10 August 2009.

=== Vereya ===
Yashar moved to Vereya in July 2014.

=== Maritsa Plovdiv ===
On 17 June 2017, Yashar joined Maritsa Plovdiv. He left the club at the end of the 2017–18 season following the relegation to Third League.

=== Nesebar ===
In June 2018, Yashar returned to Nesebar.

=== Botev Galabovo ===
In January 2019, Yashar joined Botev Galabovo.

=== Lokomotiv Gorna Oryahovitsa ===
In June 2020, Yashar joined Lokomotiv Gorna Oryahovitsa.

=== Krumovgrad ===
In June 2024, Yashar joined Krumovgrad.

=== Asenovets ===
In June 2025, Yashar joined Asenovets as executive director, while also playing in matches for the club. On 11 August 2026, he was announced as the club's new team manager. On 19 August 2026, he played in a Bulgarian Cup match.
