= Martin Sorakov =

Bulgarian footballer

Personal information
- Full name: Martin Plamenov Sorakov
- Date of birth: 23 October 2003 (age 23)
- Place of birth: Sofia, Bulgaria
- Height: 1.80 m (5 ft 11 in)
- Positions: Second striker; forward

Team information
- Current team: CSKA Sofia II
- Number: 7

Youth career
- Slavia Sofia

Senior career*
Years	Team	Apps	(Gls)
2021–2025	Slavia Sofia II	13	(10)
2021–2025	Slavia Sofia	57	(3)
2023	→ Krumovgrad (loan)	23	(8)
2024–2025	→ Montana (loan)	29	(12)
2025–	CSKA Sofia II	36	(7)
2025–	CSKA Sofia	0	(0)

International career^{‡}
2019–2020	Bulgaria U17	4	(0)
2021–2022	Bulgaria U19	10	(2)
2021–2024	Bulgaria U21	13	(2)
- * Club domestic league appearances and goals as of 19:16, 16 November 2026 (UTC) ‡ National team caps and goals as of 08:25, 22 November 2023 (UTC)

Martin Plamenov Sorakov (Bulgarian: Мартин Пламенов Сораков; born 23 October 2003) is a Bulgarian professional footballer who plays as a forward for CSKA Sofia II.

== Career ==
Sorakov began his career with Slavia Sofia. In January 2023 he was loaned out to Krumovgrad until end of season. In July, his loan was extended, due to Krumovgrad's promotion to the First League. After his good play for the team, on 7 September his loan was shorted out and he returned to Slavia's first team.

== Career statistics ==
=== Club ===
As of 13 November 2026

Club performance			League		Cup		Continental		Other		Total	
Club	League	Season	Apps	Goals	Apps	Goals	Apps	Goals	Apps	Goals	Apps	Goals
Bulgaria			League		Bulgarian Cup		Europe		Other		Total	
Slavia Sofia	First League	2020–21	11	0	3	0	–		–		14	0
Slavia Sofia	First League	2021–22	22	1	1	0	–		–		23	1
Slavia Sofia	First League	2022–23	5	0	1	0	–		–		6	0
Slavia Sofia	First League	2023–24	18	2	2	1	–		–		20	3
Slavia Sofia	First League	2024–25	1	0	0	0	–		–		1	0
Slavia Sofia	Total		57	3	7	1	0	0	0	0	64	4
Krumovgrad (loan)	Second League	2022–23	16	7	0	0	–		–		16	7
Krumovgrad (loan)	First League	2023–24	7	1	0	0	–		–		7	1
Krumovgrad (loan)	Total		23	8	0	0	0	0	0	0	23	8
Montana (loan)	Second League	2024–25	29	12	1	0	–		–		30	12
CSKA Sofia II	Second League	2025–26	23	5	–		–		–		23	5
CSKA Sofia II	Second League	2026–27	13	2	–		–		–		13	2
CSKA Sofia II	Total		36	7	0	0	0	0	0	0	36	7
CSKA Sofia	First League	2025–26	0	0	0	0	–		–		0	0
Career statistics			148	31	6	0	0	0	0	0	153	31
