= Petar Marinov (footballer, 2000) =

Bulgarian footballer (born 2000)

Personal information
- Full name: Petar Totev Marinov
- Date of birth: 28 June 2000 (age 26)
- Place of birth: Kazanlak, Bulgaria
- Height: 1.87 m (6 ft 1 1/2 in)
- Position: Goalkeeper

Team information
- Current team: CSKA 1948
- Number: 1

Youth career
- Arsenal 2000
- Rozova Dolina

Senior career*
Years	Team	Apps	(Gls)
2016–2021	Rozova Dolina	91	(0)
2021–2023	Strumska Slava	2	(0)
2023–2025	CSKA 1948 II	7	(0)
2024–	CSKA 1948	55	(0)
- * Club domestic league appearances and goals as of 11 June 2026

Petar Marinov (Bulgarian: Петър Маринов; born 28 June 2000) is a Bulgarian professional footballer who plays as a goalkeeper for First League club CSKA 1948 Sofia.

== Career ==
Marinov started his youth career in the local Arsenal 2000 Academy, before moving to Rozova Dolina and joining the first team in 2016. On 5 June 2021 he played important role in the final of Cup of Bulgarian Amateur Football League against Marek Dupnitsa, won by Rozova Dolina. Few days earlier it was announced he will move to Second League team of Strumska Slava.

In January 2023 Marinov was transferred to CSKA 1948, joining their second team. On 3 March 2024 he completed his professional debut in a league match against Ludogorets Razgrad.

== Career statistics ==
=== Club ===
As of match played 11 August 2026

Appearances and goals by club, season and competition
Club	Season	League			National cup		Europe		Other		Total	
Club	Season	Division	Apps	Goals	Apps	Goals	Apps	Goals	Apps	Goals	Apps	Goals
Strumska Slava	2021–22	Second League	2	0	0	0	—		—		2	0
Strumska Slava	2022–23	Second League	0	0	1	0	—		—		1	0
Strumska Slava	Total		2	0	1	0	—		—		3	0
CSKA 1948 II	2022–23	Second League	0	0	—		—		—		0	0
CSKA 1948 II	2023–24	Second League	3	0	—		—		—		3	0
CSKA 1948 II	2024–25	Second League	4	0	—		—		—		7	0
CSKA 1948 II	Total		7	0	—		—		—		7	0
CSKA 1948	2023–24	First League	15	0	—		—		1 (Note: Appearance(s) in UEFA Conference League play-off)	0	16	0
CSKA 1948	2024–25	First League	23	0	1	0	4 (Note: Appearance(s) in UEFA Conference League)	0	—		28	0
CSKA 1948	2025–26	First League	17	0	1	0	—		—		18	0
CSKA 1948	2026–27	First League	2	0	0	0	4	0	—		6	0
CSKA 1948	Total		57	0	2	0	8	0	1	0	68	0
Career statistics			66	0	3	0	8	0	1	0	78	0

== Honours ==
=== Club ===
Rozova Dolina Kazanlak

- Cup of Bulgarian Amateur Football League: 2020–2021

CSKA 1948 II

- Second League: 2022–23
