= Ahmed Osman (footballer) =

Bulgarian footballer

Personal information
- Full name: Ahmed Myumyun Osman
- Date of birth: 23 April 1985 (age 41)
- Place of birth: Dimitrovgrad, Bulgaria
- Height: 1.76 m (5 ft 9 in)
- Position: Forward

Team information
- Current team: Dimitrovgrad
- Number: 10

Senior career*
Years	Team	Apps	(Gls)
- Dimitrovgrad
2015–2020	Arda Kardzhali	86	(35)
2020–2021	Dimitrovgrad		
2021–2023	Krumovgrad	49	(32)
2023–2025	Sayana Haskovo	52	(27)
2025–	Dimitrovgrad	11	(6)
- * Club domestic league appearances and goals as of 06:27, 2 May 2025 (UTC)

Ahmed Osman (Bulgarian: Ахмед Осман; born 23 April 1985) is a Bulgarian professional footballer who plays for Dimitrovgrad as a forward.

== Career ==
Osman mainly played amateur football until he joined Arda Kardzhali in 2015, at the age of 30. The team was part of 4th league back then, but managed to promote to Second League in 2018. In 2019 he scored the winning goal of the play-off and Arda eventually managed to win 1–0 over PFC Septemvri Sofia at the Lokomotiv Stadium in Plovdiv, thus resulting in the club's first-time ever participation in the Bulgarian First League. Because of this, he was honored as Honorary citizenship of Kardzhali. He played 9 matches in First League next season, before being released from the team in 2020.

In June 2021, he joined Krumovgrad in Third League. He ended the season with 24 goals, becoming the top goalscorer of the team and the team won promotion. Together with Martin Sorakov, he become a top goalscorer of the team in Bulgarian Second League. He was released from Krumovgrad in June 2023.

In August 2023 he moved to Sayana Haskovo. In the mid season, he was a leading goalscorer of the team with 14 goals.
