= FC Krumovgrad =

- Full name: Football Club Krumovgrad 1925
- Nickname: Златотърсачите (The Golddiggers)
- Founded: 1925; 101 years ago
- Ground: Stadium Krumovgrad
- Capacity: 3,000
- Chairman: Vasil Sarmov
- Head coach: Tancho Kalpakov
- League: Third League
- 2025–26: A RFG Sofia, 1st (promoted)
- Website: fckrumovgrad.bg
Home colours	Away colours

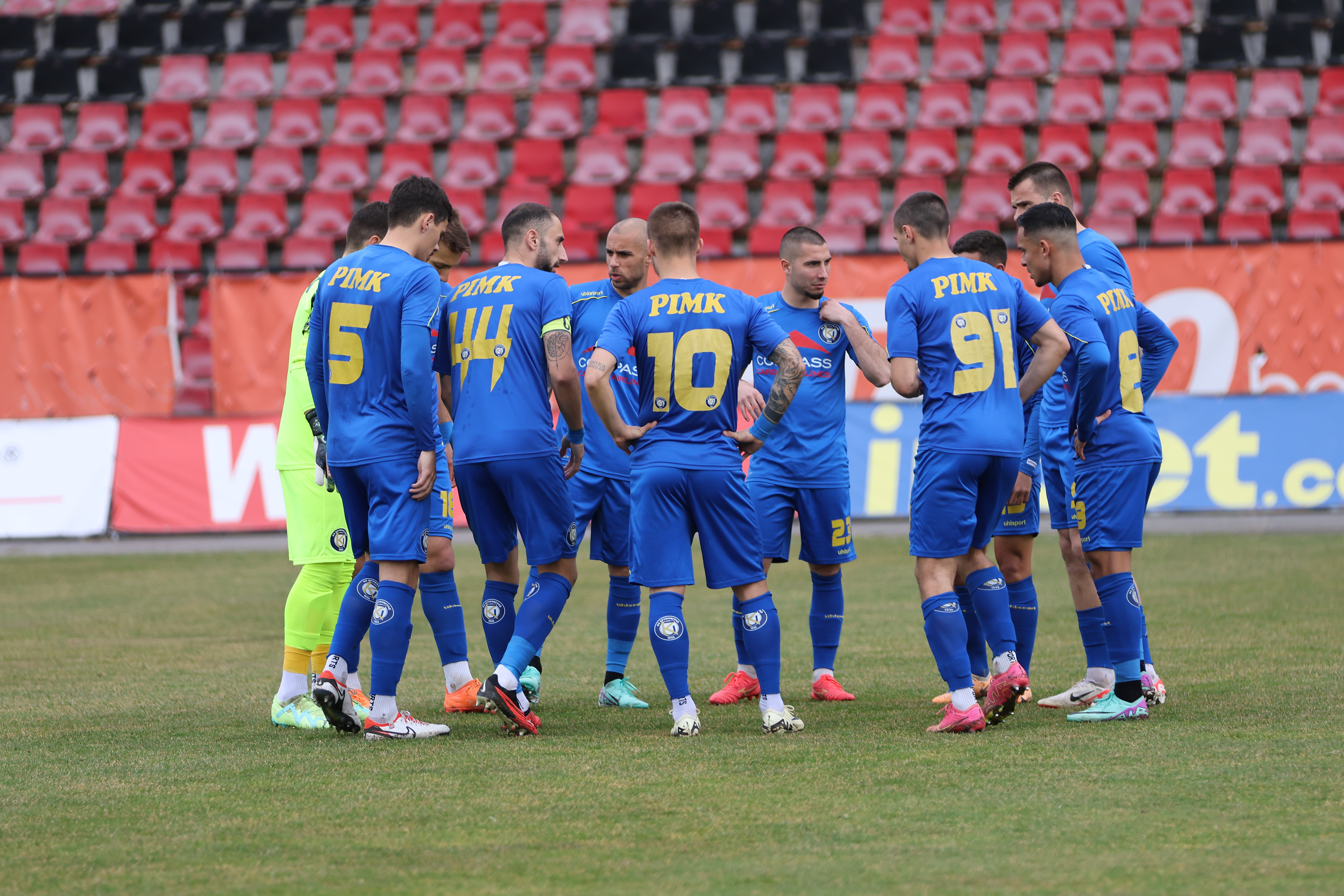

Football Club Krumovgrad 1925 (Bulgarian: Футболен клуб Крумовград 1925) is a football club based in Krumovgrad, Bulgaria, which competes in the Third League, the third level of Bulgarian football league system. The team plays its home matches at the local Krumovgrad Stadium.

== History ==
=== Establishment and regional leagues ===
Original club was founded as Levski Krumovgrad in 1925, the team mostly played in the regional leagues. For a short period the team did not exist, but in 2005, the team was refounded under the name Levski 2005.

=== FC Krumovgrad and professional leagues (2021–2025) ===
In 2021 the team won a promotion to the Bulgarian Third League and indicated serious ambitions to win the group and be promoted to the professional football with Stefan Genov becoming a manager. On 21 September 2021 they eliminated the First League team of Tsarsko Selo. In October 2021, the club changed its name from Levski 2005 to Krumovgrad and adopted a new badge. In February 2022 Krumovgrad signed with Daniel Cerejido, the chief executive officer of Botev Plovdiv. On 14 March 2022 the club won South-East Third League and was promoted to the Second League for the first time in their history. On 26 May 2023 Krumovgrad secured their promotion to First League, for the first time in their history by finishing third in the second division, a place granting automatic promotion to the first league.

For the 2023-2024 season, the club played its home games at the Komatevo ground in Plovdiv, due to its own stadium not meeting the requirements for hosting top division matches. The opener of Krumovgrad's maiden season in the first flight was an unlikely 3:1 victory at home, against reigning efbet League champions Ludogorets. Krumovgrad eventually managed to finish in 6th place in its maiden season in the top tier. In their second season, they finished 15th and got relegated to the Second Professional Football League (Bulgaria). On 2 July 2025 the club announced that they will not be participating in Second League, due to the fact that they do not have a stadium at which they can play their home games.

On 10 October 2025, the second team announced they had joined the Kardzhali/Smolyan regional league, which is the 4th level of Bulgarian football. The second team won the promotional playoff against OFC Pomorie, which returned the first team to the Third League.

== Honours ==
- Bulgarian Cup:
  - Round of 16 (1): 2021–22
- Third League
  - Winners (1): 2021–22

== Colours and badge ==
Krumovgrad plays in blue and yellow colours.

Period	Kit manufacturer	Shirt front partner	Shirt back partner
2021–2023	(Germany) Uhlsport	None	
2023–	(Germany) Uhlsport	Compass Cargo Airlines	PIMK

== Players ==
=== Current squad ===
As of 30 October 2026

Note: Flags indicate national team as defined under FIFA eligibility rules; some limited exceptions apply. Players may hold more than one non-FIFA nationality.

No.	Pos.	Nation	Player
1	GK	BUL	Deniz Rusev
2	DF	BUL	Dimitar Kalchev
3	DF	BUL	Dimitar Pirgov
4	DF	BUL	Stiliyan Damyanov
5	DF	BUL	Petar Genchev
7	DF	BUL	Momchil Tsvetanov
8	MF	BUL	Bogomil Bozhurkin
9	FW	BUL	Veselin Marchev
10	MF	BUL	Dimo Bakalov
11	DF	BUL	Aleksandar Georgiev
12	MF	BUL	Stanislav Malamov
14	DF	BUL	Blagovest Velichkov
15	MF	BUL	Hristian Dimitrov

No.	Pos.	Nation	Player
16	FW	BUL	Krasimir Todorov
17	FW	BUL	Denis Givedzhov
18	MF	BUL	Ivan Uzunov
19	FW	BUL	Daniel Ivanov
20	MF	BUL	Vidol Seymenski
21	GK	BUL	Blagoy Makendzhiev
22	DF	BUL	Georgi Ivanov
26	MF	BUL	Ivan Krastev
29	GK	BUL	Hristiano Yanakiev
40	MF	BUL	Nikola Gigov
77	FW	BUL	Oktay Yusein
88	MF	BUL	Blagovest Danchev

For recent transfers, see List of Bulgarian football transfers summer 2025.

=== Out on loan ===
Note: Flags indicate national team as defined under FIFA eligibility rules; some limited exceptions apply. Players may hold more than one non-FIFA nationality.

No. / Pos. / Nation / Player	No. / Pos. / Nation / Player

=== Foreign players ===
Up to five non-EU nationals can be registered and given a squad number for the first team in the Bulgarian First Professional League however only three can be used in a match day. Those non-EU nationals with European ancestry can claim citizenship from the nation their ancestors came from. If a player does not have European ancestry he can claim Bulgarian citizenship after playing in Bulgaria for 5 years.

EU Nationals

EU Nationals (Dual citizenship)

Non-EU Nationals

== Notable players ==
For all players with a Wikipedia article see Category:FC Krumovgrad players.

The footballers enlisted below have international caps for their respective countries or more than 100 caps for Krumovgrad. Players whose name is listed in bold represented their countries.

Bulgaria

- (Bulgaria) **Aleksandar Kolev**
- (Bulgaria) **Blagoy Makendzhiev**
- (Bulgaria) **Dimitar Pirgov**
- (Bulgaria) **Momchil Tsvetanov**
- (Bulgaria) **Serkan Yusein**

Europe

- (Moldova) **Alexandru Osipov**

Africa

- (Central African Republic) **Peter Guinari**
- (Gabon) **Sidney Obissa**

== Past seasons ==
Results of league and cup competitions by season
Season	League											Bulgarian Cup	Other competitions	Top goalscorer	
Season	Division	Level	P	W	D	L	F	A	GD	Pts	Pos	Bulgarian Cup	Other competitions	Top goalscorer	
2021–22	South-East Third League	3	34	27	5	2	112	16	+96	86	1st ↑	Round of 16		(Bulgaria) Ahmed Osman	25
2022–23	Second League	2	34	17	9	8	43	33	+10	60	3rd ↑	Round of 32		(Bulgaria) Martin Sorakov (Bulgaria) Ahmed Osman	7
2023–24	First League	1	35	13	10	12	45	45	+0	49	6th	Round of 32		(Bulgaria) **Aleksandar Kolev**	**15**
2024–25	First League	1	37	8	9	20	20	45	-25	33	15th ↓	Round of 16		(Brazil) **Matheus Souza**	4
2025–26	Second League	2	—	—	—	—	—	—	—	—	— ↓	DSQ		—	—
2025–26	A Regional Kardzhali/Smolyan *	4	12	10	1	1	63	10	+53	31	1st ↑	DSQ			
2026–27	Third League	3													

Key

- GS = Group stage
- QF = Quarter-finals
- SF = Semi-finals

Champions	Runners-up	Promoted	Relegated

== Goalscoring and appearance records ==
As of 19 February 2026

**Most league appearances for the club**

Rank	Name	Career	Appearances
1	(Bulgaria) **Blagoy Makendzhiev**	2021–2025; 2026–present	67
—	(Bulgaria) Yanko Georgiev	2023–2025	67
3	(Bulgaria) **Oktay Yusein**	2021–present	65
4	(Bulgaria) Tsvetelin Radev	2021–2023	62
5	(Bulgaria) Dzhuneyt Yashar	2021–2024	59
6	(Croatia) Matej Šimić	2023–2025	52
7	(Bulgaria) Ahmed Osman	2021–2023	49
8	(Bulgaria) Kaloyan Stefanov	2021–2023	47
9	(Ukraine) Vyacheslav Velyev	2023–2024	46
10	(Bulgaria) Serkan Yusein	2023–2025	45

**Most league goals for the club**

Rank	Name	Career	Goals
1	(Bulgaria) Ahmed Osman	2021–2023	32
2	(Bulgaria) Dzhuneyt Yashar	2021–2024	17
3	(Bulgaria) Aleksandar Kolev	2023–2024	15
4	(Bulgaria) Petar Hristov	2021–2022	14
5	(Bulgaria) Miroslav Budinov	2021–2022	11
6	(Bulgaria) Tsvetelin Radev	2021–2023	10
–	(Bulgaria) Kaloyan Stefanov	2021–2023	10
8	(Bulgaria) Martin Sorakov	2023	8
9	(Bulgaria) Serkan Yusein	2023–2025	8
10	(Brazil) Patrick Luan	2023–2025	6

- Players in **bold** are still playing for Krumovgrad.

== Personnel ==
=== Club officials ===
As of March 2025

Name	Position
Management
(Bulgaria) Asen Karaslavov	Head of first team football
(Bulgaria) Kostadin Nichev	Sporting Director
(Bulgaria) Stefan Genov	Board Member
Coaching staff
(Bulgaria) Atanas Stoilov	Head coach

=== Manager history ===
Name	Nat	From	To	Honours
Stefan Genov	(Bulgaria)	17 June 2021	31 May 2022	1 Third League title
Akis Vavalis	(Greece)	1 July 2022	3 October 2022	
Velislav Vutsov	(Bulgaria)	4 October 2022	23 December 2022	
Nemanja Miljanović	(Bosnia and Herzegovina) (Sweden)	8 January 2023	28 October 2023	
Stanislav Genchev	(Bulgaria)	28 October 2023	31 May 2024	
Atanas Ribarski	(Bulgaria)	1 June 2024	4 March 2025	
Miroslav Kosev	(Bulgaria)	4 March 2025	2 April 2025	
Rosen Kirilov	(Bulgaria)	2 April 2025	30 July 2025	
Atanas Stoilov	(Bulgaria)	11 February 2026		
