= 2022–23 Second Professional Football League (Bulgaria) =

67th season of the Second Professional Football League (Bulgaria)

Second Professional Football League
- Season: 2022–23
- Dates: 14 July 2022 – 4 June 2023
- Champions: CSKA 1948 Sofia II
- Promoted: Etar; Krumovgrad
- Relegated: Botev Plovdiv II; Minyor Pernik; Sozopol; Vitosha Bistritsa
- Matches: 306
- Goals: 690 (2.25 per match)
- Top goalscorer: 15 goals Yordan Dimitrov (Dunav Ruse); Valentin Yoskov (CSKA 1948 II)
- Biggest home win: Dunav Ruse 5–0 Botev Plovdiv II (10 September 2022)
- Biggest away win: Sozopol 0–5 CSKA 1948 II (11 November 2022)
- Highest scoring: Dobrudzha 6–2 Sportist Svoge (13 November 2022)
- Longest winning run: 5 games Krumovgrad
- Longest unbeaten run: 9 games CSKA 1948 II; Etar
- Longest winless run: 10 games Spartak Pleven; Strumska Slava
- Longest losing run: 6 games Belasitsa
- All statistics correct as of 4 June 2023.

The 2022–23 Second League is the 67th season of the Second League, the second tier of the Bulgarian football league system, and the 7th season under this name and current league structure.

For this season, the league was reduced from 20 to 18 teams, with four teams relegated to Third League, five teams promoted from Third League and three teams promoted to First League.

== Teams ==
The following teams have changed division since the 2021–22 season.

=== To Second League ===
Promoted from Third League

- Dunav Ruse
- Spartak Pleven
- Krumovgrad
- Belasitsa Petrich
- Vitosha Bistritsa

Relegated from First League

- None

=== From Second League ===
Relegated to Third League

- Levski Lom
- Neftochimic Burgas
- Marek Dupnitsa
- Septemvri Simitli

Promoted to First League

- Septemvri Sofia
- Hebar
- Spartak Varna

== Stadium and locations ==
Location of teams in 2022–23 Second League

Team	City	Stadium	Capacity
Belasitsa	Petrich	Tsar Samuil	12,000
Botev II	Plovdiv	Futbolen kompleks Botev 1912	3,500
CSKA 1948 II	Sofia	Bistritsa	2,500
Dobrudzha	Dobrich	Druzhba	12,500
Dunav	Ruse	Gradski	13,000
Etar	Veliko Tarnovo	Ivaylo	18,000
Krumovgrad	Krumovgrad	Krumovgrad	1,500
Litex	Lovech	Gradski	8,100
Ludogorets II	Razgrad	Eagles' Nest	2,000
Maritsa	Plovdiv	Maritsa	5,000
Minyor	Pernik	Minyor	8,000
Montana	Montana	Ogosta	6,000
Sozopol	Sozopol	Arena Sozopol	3,500
Spartak	Pleven	Pleven	22,000
Sportist	Svoge	Chavdar Tsvetkov	3,500
Strumska Slava	Radomir	Gradski	3,500
Vitosha	Bistritsa	Bistritsa	2,500
Yantra	Gabrovo	Hristo Botev	14,000

== Personnel and sponsorship ==
Note: Flags indicate national team as has been defined under FIFA eligibility rules. Players and managers may hold more than one non-FIFA nationality.

Team	Manager	Captain	Kit manufacturer	Shirt sponsor	Kit sponsor
Belasitsa	(Bulgaria) Ventsislav Ivanov	(Bulgaria) Martin Taushanov	Jako	efbet	—
Botev Plovdiv II	(Israel) Daniel Cohen	(Bulgaria) Dimitar Balinov	Uhlsport	WinBet	—
CSKA 1948 II	(Bulgaria) Atanas Ribarski	(Bulgaria) Georgi Mariyanov	Adidas	efbet	Bachkovo
Dobrudzha	(Bulgaria) Sasho Angelov	(Bulgaria) Dimitar Iliev	Jako	8888.bg	—
Dunav	(Bulgaria) Lyudmil Kirov	(Bulgaria) Diyan Dimov	Uhlsport	WinBet	—
Etar	(Bulgaria) Emanuel Lukanov	(Bulgaria) Zdravko Iliev	Joma	WinBet	—
Krumovgrad	(Bosnia and Herzegovina) Nemanja Milanovic	(Bulgaria) Krasimir Iliev	Uhlsport	—	—
Litex	(Bulgaria) Andrey Andreev	(Bulgaria) Iliyan Kapitanov	Givova	WinBet	—
Ludogorets II	(Bulgaria) Todor Zhivondov	(Bulgaria) Tsvetoslav Petrov	Nike	Efbet	Vivacom, Spetema
Maritsa	(Bulgaria) Nikolay Dimitrov	(Bulgaria) Valeri Domovchiyski	Uhlsport	—	—
Minyor	(Bulgaria) Krasimir Petrov	(Bulgaria) Andreas Vasev	Joma	efbet	—
Montana	(Bulgaria) Angel Stoykov	(Bulgaria) Ivan Mihov	Joma	efbet	—
Sоzopol	(Bulgaria) Margarit Dimov	(Bulgaria) Diyan Moldovanov	Hummel	efbet	—
Spartak	(Bulgaria) Tsvetomir Mladenov	(Bulgaria) Ivo Varbanov	Jako	efbet	—
Sportist	(Bulgaria) Petar Kolev	(Bulgaria) Borislav Stoychev	Zeus	Petar Electric	—
Strumska Slava	(Bulgaria) Anatoli Nankov	(Bulgaria) Borislav Nikolov	Jako	efbet	—
Vitosha	(Bulgaria) Nikolay Hristozov	(Bulgaria) Emil Gargorov	Jumper	efbet	—
Yantra	(Bulgaria) Zhivko Zhelev	(Bulgaria) Petar Kazakov	Jumper	efbet	—

Note: Individual clubs may wear jerseys with advertising. However, only one sponsorship is permitted per jersey for official tournaments organised by UEFA in addition to that of the kit manufacturer (exceptions are made for non-profit organisations). Clubs in the domestic league can have more than one sponsorship per jersey which can feature on the front of the shirt, incorporated with the main sponsor or in place of it; or on the back, either below the squad number or on the collar area. Shorts also have space available for advertisement.

=== Managerial changes ===
Team	Outgoing manager	Manner of departure	Date of vacancy	Position in table	Incoming manager	Date of appointment
Botev II	(Bulgaria) Stefan Stoyanov	Mutual consent	24 May 2022	Pre-season	(Armenia) Artur Hovhannisyan	12 June 2022
Etar	(Bulgaria) Veselin Velikov	Resigned	27 May 2022	Pre-season	(Bulgaria) Emanuel Lukanov	8 June 2022
CSKA 1948 II	(Bulgaria) Vladimir Dimitrov	Mutual consent	28 May 2022	Pre-season	(Bulgaria) Valentin Iliev	29 May 2022
Krumovgrad	(Bulgaria) Stefan Genov	Reassigned as a technical director	3 June 2022	Pre-season	(Greece) Akis Vavalis	7 June 2022
Belasitsa	(Bulgaria) Nikolay Nikolov	Mutual consent	5 June 2022	Pre-season	(Bulgaria) Ivo Trenchev	13 June 2022
Litex	(Bulgaria) Zhivko Zhelev	Mutual consent	22 June 2022	Pre-season	(Bulgaria) Andrey Andreev	28 June 2022
Botev II	(Armenia) Artur Hovhannisyan	Reassigned to Botev Plovdiv coaching staff	22 August 2022	18th	(Bosnia and Herzegovina) Nemanja Milanovic	22 August 2022
Belasitsa	(Bulgaria) Ivo Trenchev	Mutual consent	21 August 2022	5th	(Bulgaria) Ventsislav Ivanov	24 August 2022
Dunav	(Bulgaria) Martin Tsirkov	Mutual consent	31 August 2022	13th	(Bulgaria) Ivaylo Kirilov (interim)	31 August 2022
Montana	(Bulgaria) Antoni Zdravkov	Resigned	8 September 2022	8th	(Bulgaria) Svetlan Kondev (interim)	10 September 2022
Dunav	(Bulgaria) Ivaylo Kirilov	End of interim period	12 September 2022	12th	(Bulgaria) Lyudmil Kirov	12 September 2022
Montana	(Bulgaria) Svetlan Kondev	End of interim period	13 September 2022	7th	(Bulgaria) Ferario Spasov	13 September 2022
Minyor	(Bulgaria) Hristo Yanev	Mutual consent	14 September 2022	13th	(Bulgaria) Petar Anestiev (interim)	14 September 2022
Yantra	(Bulgaria) Sasho Angelov	Resigned	26 September 2022	13th	(Bulgaria) Nikolay Vasilev (interim)	26 September 2022
Minyor	(Bulgaria) Petar Anestiev	End of interim period	29 September 2022	16th	(Bulgaria) Emil Serafimov	29 September 2022
Krumovgrad	(Greece) Akis Vavalis	Resigned	4 October 2022	5th	(Bulgaria) Velislav Vutsov	4 October 2022
Yantra	(Bulgaria) Nikolay Vasilev	End of interim period	5 October 2022	16th	(Bulgaria) Zhivko Zhelev	5 October 2022
Dobrudzha	(Bulgaria) Atanas Atanasov	Resigned	16 October 2022	17th	(Bulgaria) Sasho Angelov	18 October 2022
Sportist	(Bulgaria) Borislav Kyosev	Mutual consent	23 November 2022	5th	(Bulgaria) Petar Kolev	17 December 2022
CSKA 1948 II	(Bulgaria) Valentin Iliev	Mutual consent	14 December 2022	1st	(Bulgaria) Atanas Ribarski	29 December 2022
Botev II	(Bosnia and Herzegovina) Nemanja Milanovic	Mutual consent	27 December 2022	15th	(Israel) Daniel Cohen	5 January 2023
Krumovgrad	(Bulgaria) Velislav Vutsov	Mutual consent	23 December 2022	2nd	(Bosnia and Herzegovina) Nemanja Milanovic	8 January 2023
Montana	(Bulgaria) Ferario Spasov	Mutual consent	17 February 2023	9th	(Bulgaria) Angel Stoykov	25 February 2023
Strumska Slava	(Bulgaria) Yuriy Vasev	Mutual consent	21 February 2023	12th	(Bulgaria) Anatoli Nankov	28 February 2023
Spartak	(Bulgaria) Krasimir Bislimov	Mutual consent	1 March 2023	6th	(Bulgaria) Tsvetomir Mladenov	1 March 2023
Minyor	(Bulgaria) Emil Serafimov	Sacked	2 March 2023	16th	(Bulgaria) Krasimir Petrov	2 March 2023

== League table ==
Pos	Team	Pld	W	D	L	GF	GA	GD	Pts	Promotion, qualification or relegation
1	CSKA 1948 II (C)	34	22	8	4	60	17	+43	74	Ineligible for promotion
2	Etar (P)	34	18	9	7	47	22	+25	63	Promotion to the First League
3	Krumovgrad (P)	34	17	9	8	43	33	+10	60	Promotion to the First League
4	Ludogorets Razgrad II	34	17	6	11	42	35	+7	57	Ineligible for promotion
5	Sportist Svoge (Q)	34	14	10	10	41	40	+1	52	Qualification for the promotion play-off
6	Dunav Ruse	34	13	11	10	47	38	+9	50	
7	Maritsa Plovdiv	34	14	5	15	36	46	−10	47	
8	Yantra	34	11	11	12	31	34	−3	44	
9	Litex Lovech	34	11	11	12	32	28	+4	44	
10	Montana	34	12	8	14	37	39	−2	44	
11	Spartak Pleven	34	10	12	12	44	44	0	42	
12	Belasitsa Petrich	34	12	5	17	33	41	−8	41	
13	Dobrudzha	34	10	9	15	38	40	−2	39	
14	Strumska Slava	34	9	12	13	35	44	−9	39	
15	Minyor Pernik (R)	34	9	11	14	33	35	−2	38	Relegation to the Third League
16	Sozopol (R)	34	9	11	14	32	52	−20	38	Relegation to the Third League
17	Vitosha Bistritsa (R)	34	9	9	16	34	50	−16	36	Relegation to the Third League
18	Botev Plovdiv II (R)	34	7	7	20	25	52	−27	28	Relegation to the Third League

Updated to match(es) played on 4 June 2023. Source: bulgarian-football.com
Rules for classification: 1) Points; 2) Head-to-head points; 3) Head-to-head goal difference; 4) Head-to-head goals scored; 5) Head-to-head away goals scored (only if two teams); 6) Goal difference; 7) Goals scored; 8) Fairplay ranking; 9) Draw.
(C) Champions; (P) Promoted; (Q) Qualified for the phase indicated; (R) Relegated

== Results ==
Home \ Away	BEL	BOT	CSK	DOB	DUN	ETA	KRU	LIT	LUD	MAR	MIN	MON	SOZ	SPA	SPO	STR	VIT	YAN
Belasitsa	—	1–0	0–2	2–1	1–2	1–1	1–3	1–0	0–2	0–0	1–0	1–2	2–3	3–1	3–0	3–0	0–1	1–0
Botev Plovdiv II	0–1	—	1–3	2–0	0–0	1–4	1–3	0–1	0–2	1–0	1–1	4–1	0–0	3–3	1–1	0–3	2–0	2–0
CSKA 1948 Sofia II	1–0	1–0	—	1–1	2–0	0–1	2–0	2–0	2–0	3–0	0–0	1–0	3–0	0–0	1–0	3–1	2–1	1–1
Dobrudzha	1–1	2–1	1–0	—	0–0	0–0	0–2	3–2	1–2	1–2	2–0	0–1	2–0	2–2	6–2	1–1	0–1	2–0
Dunav Ruse	0–2	5–0	0–0	1–1	—	0–0	2–1	1–1	0–1	2–1	4–2	0–1	2–2	4–2	1–0	2–1	4–1	0–1
Etar	2–0	3–0	1–3	2–1	1–1	—	0–1	0–1	0–1	3–1	2–0	2–0	1–0	3–0	1–2	2–1	2–0	1–0
Krumovgrad	3–1	1–2	1–1	2–0	1–0	2–1	—	1–1	1–0	2–1	1–0	2–1	1–2	2–1	0–0	0–0	3–2	0–0
Litex	1–0	0–1	1–1	1–0	1–3	1–1	0–0	—	3–1	1–2	3–0	0–0	4–0	3–0	1–0	1–1	0–0	0–2
Ludogorets II	3–0	1–0	0–0	2–1	3–1	1–1	1–0	1–0	—	5–0	1–0	3–2	1–1	1–0	1–1	1–1	1–0	2–2
Maritsa	1–0	2–1	0–3	2–1	1–2	0–1	2–2	1–0	2–0	—	1–0	1–0	3–0	1–0	0–0	1–2	4–1	3–0
Minyor Pernik	2–1	3–0	1–4	0–1	2–0	0–0	3–0	1–1	5–1	2–0	—	0–0	2–0	0–0	1–2	1–1	1–1	1–0
Montana	2–1	0–0	2–1	0–1	1–3	0–1	4–1	0–1	2–0	0–1	1–1	—	4–1	0–2	0–0	3–2	3–1	0–0
Sozopol	0–0	1–1	0–5	2–1	2–1	0–2	1–1	1–0	2–1	1–1	1–0	4–0	—	0–2	1–1	2–2	1–2	1–1
Spartak Pleven	1–1	2–0	0–3	3–1	0–0	1–0	1–1	1–0	1–3	4–0	3–0	0–1	0–0	—	3–0	1–1	2–1	2–2
Sportist Svoge	0–2	1–0	0–3	1–0	5–2	0–0	0–2	1–1	3–0	2–0	0–0	2–2	3–2	3–2	—	3–1	1–0	0–1
Strumska Slava	0–1	1–0	1–2	0–2	0–0	0–3	1–0	1–0	1–0	3–1	0–3	0–0	2–0	2–2	0–3	—	3–0	0–1
Vitosha Bistritsa	2–0	1–0	2–1	1–1	1–1	2–2	1–2	1–2	1–0	3–1	1–1	1–4	1–0	2–2	1–2	0–0	—	0–0
Yantra Gabrovo	4–1	4–0	1–3	1–1	0–3	1–3	0–1	0–0	1–0	0–0	1–0	1–0	0–1	1–0	1–2	2–2	2–1	—

Updated to match(es) played on 4 June 2023. Source: bulgarian-football.com
Legend: Blue = home team win; Yellow = draw; Red = away team win.
For upcoming matches, an "a" indicates there is an article about the rivalry between the two participants.

=== Results by round ===
Team ╲ Round	1	2	3	4	5	6	7	8	9	10	11	12	13	14	15	16	17	18	19	20	21	22	23	24	25	26	27	28	29	30	31	32	33	34
Belasitsa	W	L	W	L	L	W	D	W	L	W	D	W	W	D	D	W	L	D	L	W	L	L	W	L	L	L	W	W	L	L	L	L	L	L
Botev Plovdiv II	L	D	L	D	L	L	L	L	L	W	D	W	L	W	W	L	W	W	L	L	L	L	L	D	W	D	L	D	L	L	L	L	L	D
CSKA 1948 II	D	D	D	D	W	L	W	W	W	W	L	W	W	W	D	W	W	W	W	L	W	W	W	L	W	W	D	W	W	D	D	W	W	W
Dobrudzha	L	W	D	D	L	W	D	L	L	W	L	L	L	L	L	D	W	D	W	W	W	D	L	D	L	W	D	L	D	L	W	W	L	L
Dunav Ruse	W	D	W	L	L	L	D	L	W	W	W	L	L	L	D	D	W	D	D	W	D	W	L	D	W	D	L	D	W	W	W	L	W	D
Etar	W	D	D	W	D	W	D	W	D	L	W	W	W	L	L	W	D	W	D	W	W	L	W	W	W	W	D	L	D	W	L	W	W	L
Krumovgrad	W	W	L	D	L	W	D	W	D	L	W	W	W	W	L	L	W	D	W	W	L	D	D	D	L	W	D	D	L	W	W	W	W	W
Litex	L	L	W	D	W	L	D	W	D	W	W	L	W	L	D	L	D	D	L	L	L	L	W	D	L	W	D	D	W	D	D	L	W	W
Ludogorets II	L	D	L	W	L	W	L	D	L	W	W	L	W	L	W	L	W	W	L	D	W	W	W	W	L	D	D	W	W	W	W	L	D	W
Maritsa	L	W	L	L	W	D	W	W	D	L	W	L	D	D	W	L	L	W	W	L	L	D	W	L	W	L	W	W	W	L	W	L	L	L
Minyor Pernik	W	L	W	D	D	D	L	L	D	L	W	D	L	W	L	W	L	L	L	L	W	D	D	D	W	L	D	D	L	D	L	W	L	W
Montana	L	W	D	W	D	W	D	L	D	L	L	W	L	W	W	W	L	L	W	D	W	D	L	W	W	L	W	L	L	D	L	L	L	D
Sozopol	L	L	L	W	L	L	D	D	W	W	D	L	L	L	D	L	L	D	D	W	D	D	L	W	W	L	D	D	W	L	D	W	W	L
Spartak Pleven	W	W	D	L	W	L	W	W	W	L	D	D	L	D	W	W	L	L	D	L	L	D	D	D	L	D	W	L	W	D	D	L	L	D
Sportist Svoge	L	D	D	W	D	L	W	L	W	W	L	W	D	W	W	W	L	D	W	D	W	W	L	D	L	W	L	D	L	W	D	L	D	W
Strumska Slava	W	D	W	D	W	W	D	D	L	L	L	L	L	D	D	D	W	D	L	D	L	D	W	L	W	L	L	D	L	L	D	W	L	W
Vitosha Bistritsa	W	L	D	L	W	D	L	D	L	L	L	W	W	D	L	D	L	L	L	L	L	W	D	W	L	D	D	D	L	W	L	W	W	L
Yantra Gabrovo	D	D	D	D	W	D	D	L	W	L	L	L	W	D	L	L	W	L	W	W	W	L	L	L	L	D	D	D	W	D	W	W	W	L

Updated to match(es) played on 4 June 2023. Source: Bulgarian Football
W = Win; D = Draw; L = Loss

=== Positions by round ===
Team ╲ Round	1	2	3	4	5	6	7	8	9	10	11	12	13	14	15	16	17	18	19	20	21	22	23	24	25	26	27	28	29	30	31	32	33	34
Belasitsa	6	8	6	8	13	7	7	6	8	4	7	5	4	4	4	3	4	4	5	5	6	7	6	7	8	8	7	7	8	9	9	9	10	12
Botev Plovdiv II	13	14	16	16	18	18	18	18	18	18	18	18	18	16	16	16	15	13	14	15	16	16	16	18	17	16	17	17	17	18	18	18	18	18
CSKA 1948 Sofia II	10	13	13	12	8	15	6	5	3	2	3	2	2	1	1	1	1	1	1	1	1	1	1	1	1	1	1	1	1	1	1	1	1	1
Dobrudzha	11	7	9	9	15	9	9	11	14	12	15	15	17	18	18	18	17	16	15	14	12	12	14	11	13	11	12	12	13	13	13	12	13	13
Dunav Ruse	3	3	2	5	7	11	13	16	12	9	6	8	10	13	11	12	10	12	10	10	9	8	9	8	7	7	9	9	9	7	7	7	6	6
Etar	8	4	7	1	3	2	3	3	2	3	2	1	1	3	3	2	3	2	2	3	2	2	2	2	2	2	2	2	2	2	2	2	2	2
Krumovgrad	5	2	5	7	9	4	5	4	5	6	5	3	3	2	2	6	2	3	4	2	3	4	3	3	3	3	3	3	4	4	4	3	3	3
Litex	14	17	14	13	10	14	15	9	9	7	4	6	6	7	8	9	8	10	11	13	14	14	13	13	15	12	11	11	11	11	12	13	11	9
Ludogorets II	17	16	17	14	16	12	16	15	17	15	11	13	9	12	10	11	9	7	9	9	7	6	5	5	6	5	6	5	3	3	3	4	4	4
Maritsa	18	9	11	16	14	13	8	7	6	10	8	9	8	8	7	8	12	8	7	8	11	10	8	10	9	9	8	8	6	6	6	6	7	7
Minyor Pernik	1	11	4	3	4	6	12	13	13	16	12	12	15	10	13	10	13	14	16	16	15	15	15	15	12	15	15	15	15	14	15	15	17	15
Montana	12	6	8	6	5	3	3	8	7	11	13	10	11	9	9	7	7	9	8	7	5	5	7	6	5	6	5	6	7	8	8	8	9	10
Sozopol	16	18	18	17	17	17	17	17	16	14	14	14	16	17	17	17	18	18	18	17	17	18	18	17	16	17	16	16	16	16	16	16	14	16
Spartak Pleven	2	1	1	4	2	5	2	1	1	1	1	4	5	6	6	5	6	6	6	6	8	9	10	9	10	10	10	10	10	10	10	11	12	11
Sportist Svoge	15	15	15	10	12	16	10	10	11	8	10	7	7	5	5	4	5	5	3	4	4	3	4	4	4	4	4	4	5	5	5	5	5	5
Strumska Slava	4	5	3	2	1	1	1	2	4	5	9	11	12	11	12	13	11	11	12	12	13	13	12	14	11	13	13	13	14	15	14	14	15	14
Vitosha Bistritsa	7	10	10	15	11	10	14	12	15	17	17	17	14	15	15	14	16	17	17	18	18	17	17	16	18	18	18	18	18	17	17	17	16	17
Yantra Gabrovo	9	12	12	11	6	8	11	14	10	13	16	16	13	14	14	15	14	15	13	11	10	11	11	12	14	14	14	14	12	12	11	10	8	8

Updated to match(es) played on 4 June 2023. Source: Bulgarian Football
