= Tsvetelin Radev =

Bulgarian footballer

Personal information
- Full name: Tsvetelin Petrov Radev
- Date of birth: 21 December 1988 (age 37)
- Place of birth: Plovdiv, Bulgaria
- Height: 1.86 m (6 ft 1 in)
- Position: Defender

Team information
- Current team: Yambol 1915

Senior career*
Years	Team	Apps	(Gls)
2006–2008	Lokomotiv Plovdiv	3	(0)
2008–2009	Nesebar	14	(1)
2009	Vihren Sandanski	8	(0)
2010–2011	Lokomotiv Plovdiv	0	(0)
2010	→ Septemvri Simitli (loan)	7	(1)
2010–2011	→ Vihren (loan)	27	(2)
2011	Nesebar	12	(0)
2012	Tundzha Yambol	15	(1)
2012–2013	Nesebar	41	(6)
2014–2015	Vereya	43	(4)
2016–2017	Spartak Pleven	32	(5)
2017–2020	Botev Galabovo	75	(2)
2020–2021	Dobrudzha Dobrich	27	(2)
2021–2023	Krumovgrad	62	(10)
2023–2025	Yantra Gabrovo	56	(5)
2025–2026	Hebar	0	(0)
2026–	Yambol 1915	0	(0)
- * Club domestic league appearances and goals as of 5 June 2025

Tsvetelin Radev (Bulgarian: Цветелин Радев; born 21 December 1988) is a Bulgarian professional footballer who plays as a defender for Yambol 1915.
