= Kostadin Nichev =

Bulgarian footballer

Personal information
- Full name: Kostadin Ivanov Nichev
- Date of birth: 22 July 1988 (age 38)
- Place of birth: Elhovo, Bulgaria
- Height: 1.84 m (6 ft 1/2 in)
- Position: Centre back

Team information
- Current team: Krumovgrad

Senior career*
Years	Team	Apps	(Gls)
2009–2013	Lyubimets 2007	69	(1)
2013–2014	Haskovo	37	(2)
2015–2016	Dobrudzha Dobrich	40	(6)
2016–2018	Pirin Blagoevgrad	52	(2)
2018–2020	Botev Plovdiv	27	(0)
2020–2022	Botev Vratsa	35	(2)
2022–	Krumovgrad	21	(0)
- * Club domestic league appearances and goals as of 5 June 2023

Kostadin Nichev (Bulgarian: Костадин Ничев; born 22 July 1988) is a Bulgarian professional footballer who plays as a defender for Bulgarian Second League club Krumovgrad.

== Career ==
On 11 June 2018, Nichev signed a two-year contract with Botev Plovdiv.

In the summer of 2023, he was appointed as sports director at Krumovgrad, for which he had previously played.
