= Borislav Karamatev =

Bulgarian footballer and manager

Personal information
- Full name: Borislav Dimitrov Karamatev
- Date of birth: 6 February 1984 (age 42)
- Place of birth: Asenovgrad, Bulgaria
- Height: 1.78 m (5 ft 10 in)
- Position: Midfielder

Team information
- Current team: Botev Plovdiv II (assistant)

Youth career
- Asenovets

Senior career*
Years	Team	Apps	(Gls)
2003-2004	CSKA Sofia	2	(0)
2004-2008	Botev Plovdiv	94	(2)
2009	Sliven 2000	7	(0)
2009-2011	Lyubimets 2007	32	(2)
2011-2016	Asenovets		
2016-2018	Maritsa Plovdiv	56	(9)

International career
2006	Bulgaria U-21	8	(0)

Managerial career
- 2010-2014: Asenovets (youth coach)
- 2014-2016: Asenovets
- 2018-2020: Maritsa Plovdiv
- 2020-2022: Botev Plovdiv (youth coach)
- 2023-: Botev Plovdiv II (assistant)
- * Club domestic league appearances and goals

Borislav Dimitrov Karamatev (Bulgarian Cyrillic: Борислав Димитров Караматев; born 6 February 1984) is a Bulgarian former footballer who played as a midfielder. He is currently the assistant manager of Botev Plovdiv II.

== Career ==
He started his career in his home town Asenovgrad, playing for local team FC Asenovec. At 19 years old, he moved to CSKA Sofia. Between 2005 and 2008 he played for Botev Plovdiv. He returned to Botev in 2010 when the club was revived, but failed to play an official match and left after a scandal with coach Marin Bakalov, demanding a first team place.

== Coaching career ==
During his stay as a player in FC Asenovets Asenovgrad from 2010 to 2014 he was also coaching at the clubs academy, and from 2014 to 2016 in charge of the clubs first team. In the summer of 2018, he was appointed as the head coach of Maritsa Plovdiv and remained until June 19, 2020, when he started working as a coach at the Botev Plovdiv school.

In June 2018, Karamatev was appointed as manager of Maritsa Plovdiv. He left the position in June 2020, and was then immediately appointed youth coach at his former club, Botev Plovdiv. In the beginning of January 2023, Karamatev was promoted to assistant manager of the clubs reserve team, Botev Plovdiv II.
