= Serkan Yusein =

Bulgarian footballer (born 1996)

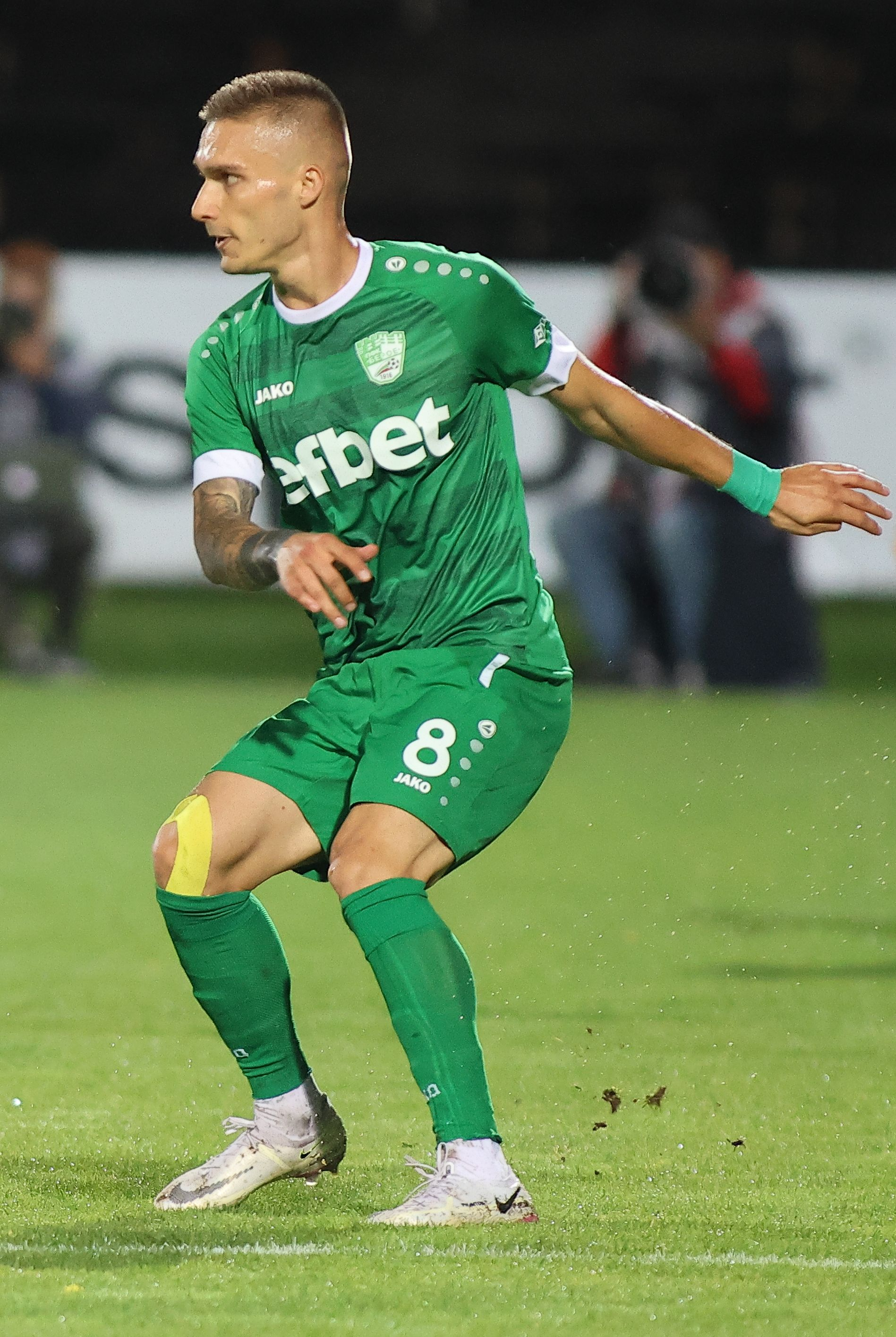

Personal information
- Full name: Serkan Kadir Yusein
- Date of birth: 31 March 1996 (age 30)
- Place of birth: Plovdiv, Bulgaria
- Height: 1.78 m (5 ft 10 in)
- Position: Defensive midfielder

Team information
- Current team: Arda Kardzhali
- Number: 20

Youth career
- 2004–2010: Botev 2002
- 2010–2013: Botev Plovdiv

Senior career*
Years	Team	Apps	(Gls)
2013–2019	Botev Plovdiv	111	(7)
2013	→ Rakovski (loan)	11	(1)
2019–2022	Ludogorets Razgrad	11	(0)
2019	→ Tsarsko Selo (loan)	11	(0)
2020	Ludogorets Razgrad II	2	(0)
2020–2021	→ CSKA 1948 (loan)	18	(0)
2021–2022	→ Beroe (loan)	25	(1)
2022–2023	Beroe	34	(2)
2023–2024	Krumovgrad	45	(8)
2025–	Arda Kardzhali	50	(2)

International career^{‡}
2011–2013	Bulgaria U17	6	(0)
2014–2015	Bulgaria U19	2	(0)
2016–2018	Bulgaria U21	12	(0)
2024–	Bulgaria	2	(0)
- * Club domestic league appearances and goals as of 11 June 2026 ‡ National team caps and goals as of 22:58, 15 October 2024 (UTC)

Serkan Kadir Yusein (Bulgarian: Серкан Кадир Юсеин; born 31 March 1996) is a Bulgarian professional footballer who plays as a midfielder for Arda Kardzhali and the Bulgaria national team.

== Career ==
=== Early career and Botev Plovdiv ===
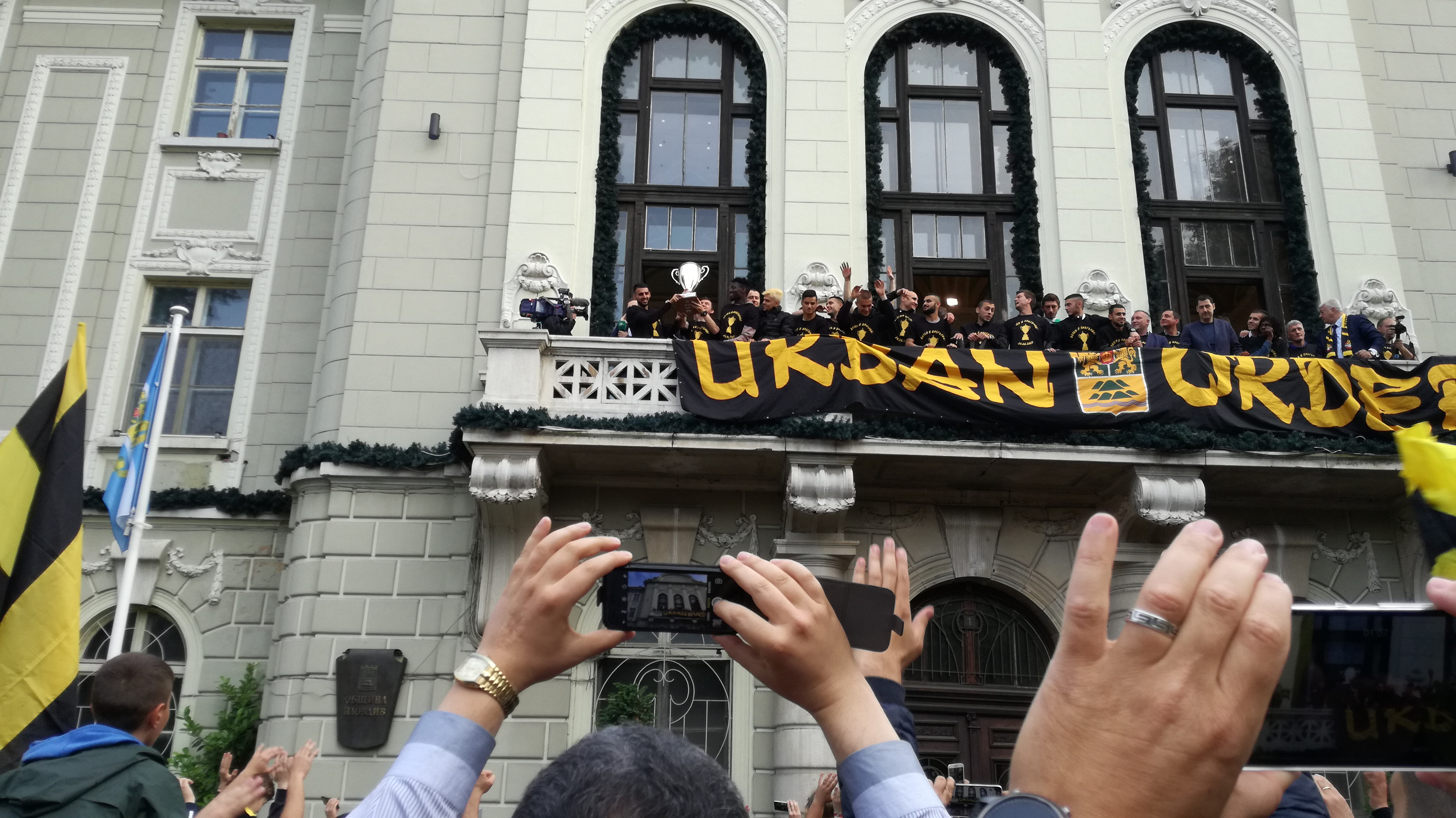
Botev Plovdiv celebrating winning the Bulgarian Football Cup in 2017

Born in Plovdiv, Yusein started to play football in the Botev 2002 Academy, before joining the youth formations of Botev Plovdiv. He began his professional career in Botev Plovdiv on 13 March 2013, when he debuted as a substitute in an away match against Minyor Pernik in Sofia. Serkan was included for the first time in the starting lineup of Botev Plovdiv during a goalless draw with CSKA Sofia on 11 May 2014.

Yusein scored his first goal for Botev Plovdiv on 23 September 2014. He came on as a substitute during the match and scored the last goal for the 0–4 away win against Lokomotiv Mezdra in the first round of the Bulgarian Cup tournament. A few days later, on 27 September, he came on as a substitute during the derby match with Lokomotiv Plovdiv which was won 2–0 by Botev Plovdiv. On 14 December Serkan played 57 minutes and left good impression on the pitch during Botev's 1–0 defeat by Ludogorets Razgrad.

==== 2015–16 season ====
Serkan was injured for the first two rounds of the 2015–16 season of the A Group. Following recovery, he took part in the games against Lokomotiv Plovdiv, Pirin Blagoevgrad, Slavia Sofia and Cherno More Varna. After being ruled out again due to injury, Serkan was included in the starting line-up on 30 October, when Botev Plovdiv were defeated 2–0 by Slavia Sofia.

==== 2016–17 season ====
On 27 August, Serkan scored his first goal in the First League during the 2–1 home victory over PFC Neftochimic Burgas. On 17 September Serkan scored again, this time during the 4–0 home win over FC Lokomotiv Gorna Oryahovitsa. On 22 October 2016 Serkan scored during the 2–3 home defeat from Cherno More Varna.

On 24 May 2017, Serkan came on as a substitute in last minutes of the historical 2–1 win over Ludogorets Razgrad in the Bulgarian Cup final and won the cup with Botev Plovdiv.

==== 2017–18 season ====
On 13 July 2017, Serkan scored an important goal for the 1–1 away draw with Beitar Jerusalem in the 2nd qualifying round of UEFA Europa League.

On 9 December 2017, Serkan scored a spectacular goal for the 3–0 win over Etar Veliko Tarnovo. A few minutes after that he was sent off. His goal was highlighted as the best goal of the round in Parva Liga.

=== Ludogorets Razgrad ===
On 7 January 2019, Ludogorets Razgrad confirmed that Yusein had signed a preliminary contract under the Bosman ruling and is set to join the team as a free agent in June 2019 if the negotiations between Botev and Ludogorets in January didn't end with a transfer agreement, but on 23 January both teams reached agreement and Yusein joined the team for an undisclosed fee.

=== Krumovgrad ===
In June 2023, Yusein joined newly promoted Krumovgrad.

=== Arda ===
In December 2024, he became part of the ranks of Arda Kardzhali.

== International career ==
Yusein received his first call up for the Bulgaria on 12 November for the UEFA Nations League matches against Finland on 15 November 2020 and Republic of Ireland on 18 November.

He made his debut on 4 June 2024 in a friendly against Romania.

== Career statistics ==
=== Club ===
As of 2 November 2024

Club performance			League		Cup		Continental		Other		Total	
Club	League	Season	Apps	Goals	Apps	Goals	Apps	Goals	Apps	Goals	Apps	Goals
Bulgaria			League		Bulgarian Cup		Europe		Other (Note: Includes Bulgarian Supercup matches.)		Total	
Botev Plovdiv	2012–13	A Group	2	0	0	0	—		—		2	0
Rakovski (loan)	2013–14	B Group	11	1	3	0	—		—		14	1
Botev Plovdiv	2013–14	A Group	1	0	0	0	0	0	—		1	0
Botev Plovdiv	2014–15	A Group	5	0	1	1	4	0	—		10	1
Botev Plovdiv	2015–16	A Group	24	0	1	0	—		—		25	0
Botev Plovdiv	2016–17	First League	32	4	6	0	—		—		38	4
Botev Plovdiv	2017–18	First League	30	1	3	0	6	1	1	0	40	2
Botev Plovdiv	2018–19	First League	17	2	2	1	—		—		19	3
Botev Plovdiv	Total		111	7	13	2	10	1	1	0	135	10
Ludogorets Razgrad	2018–19	First League	8	0	1	0	0	0	0	0	9	0
Ludogorets Razgrad	2019–20	First League	3	0	0	0	0	0	0	0	3	0
Ludogorets Razgrad	Total		11	0	1	0	0	0	0	0	11	0
Tsarsko Selo (loan)	2019–20	First League	11	0	1	0	—		—		12	0
Ludogorets Razgrad II	2019–20	Second League	2	0	—		—		—		2	0
CSKA 1948 (loan)	2020–21	First League	18	0	1	0	—		—		19	0
Beroe (loan)	2021–22	First League	25	1	3	1	—		1	0	29	2
Beroe	2022–23	First League	34	2	2	0	—		—		36	2
Beroe	Total		59	3	5	1	0	0	0	0	65	4
Krumovgrad	2023–24	First League	31	5	1	0	—		—		32	5
Krumovgrad	2024–25	First League	14	3	1	0	—		—		15	3
Krumovgrad	Total		45	8	2	0	0	0	0	0	47	8
Arda Kardzhali	2024–25	First League	0	0	0	0	—		—		0	0
Career Total			279	19	26	3	10	1	2	0	206	23

== Honours ==
Botev Plovdiv

- Bulgarian Cup (1): 2016–17
- Bulgarian Supercup (1): 2017

Ludogorets Razgrad

- First Professional Football League (1): 2018–19
- Bulgarian Supercup (1): 2019
