= Sidney Obissa =

Gabonese footballer

Personal information
- Full name: Sidney Evrard Viérin Obissa
- Date of birth: 4 May 2000 (age 26)
- Place of birth: Libreville, Gabon
- Height: 1.90 m (6 ft 3 in)
- Position: Defender

Senior career*
Years	Team	Apps	(Gls)
2019–2023	Ajaccio B	13	(0)
2019–2023	Ajaccio	0	(0)
2021–2022	→ Olympic Charleroi (loan)	5	(0)
2022–2023	→ Villefranche (loan)	27	(1)
2023–2024	Francs Borains	19	(0)
2024–2025	RFC Seraing	0	(0)
2025	Krumovgrad	7	(1)
2025–2026	Orléans	5	(0)

International career^{‡}
2020–	Gabon	11	(0)
- * Club domestic league appearances and goals as of 20 August 2026 ‡ National team caps and goals as of 10:54, 03 May 2023 (UTC)

Sidney Evrard Viérin Obissa (born 4 May 2000) is a Gabonese professional footballer who plays as a defender for the Gabon national team.

== Club career ==
On 7 March 2020, Obissa signed his first professional contract with Ajaccio. On 1 September 2021, he joined Belgian third-tier club Olympic Charleroi on loan. On 11 August 2022, Obissa was loaned by Villefranche.

On 3 August 2023, Obissa signed with Francs Borains in Belgian second-tier Challenger Pro League.

== International career ==
Obissa debuted with the Gabon national team in a friendly 2–0 friendly loss to Benin on 12 October 2020. Obissa featured for Gabon national team in the 2021 AFCON tournament in Cameroon.
