= Miroslav Kosev =

Bulgarian footballer and manager

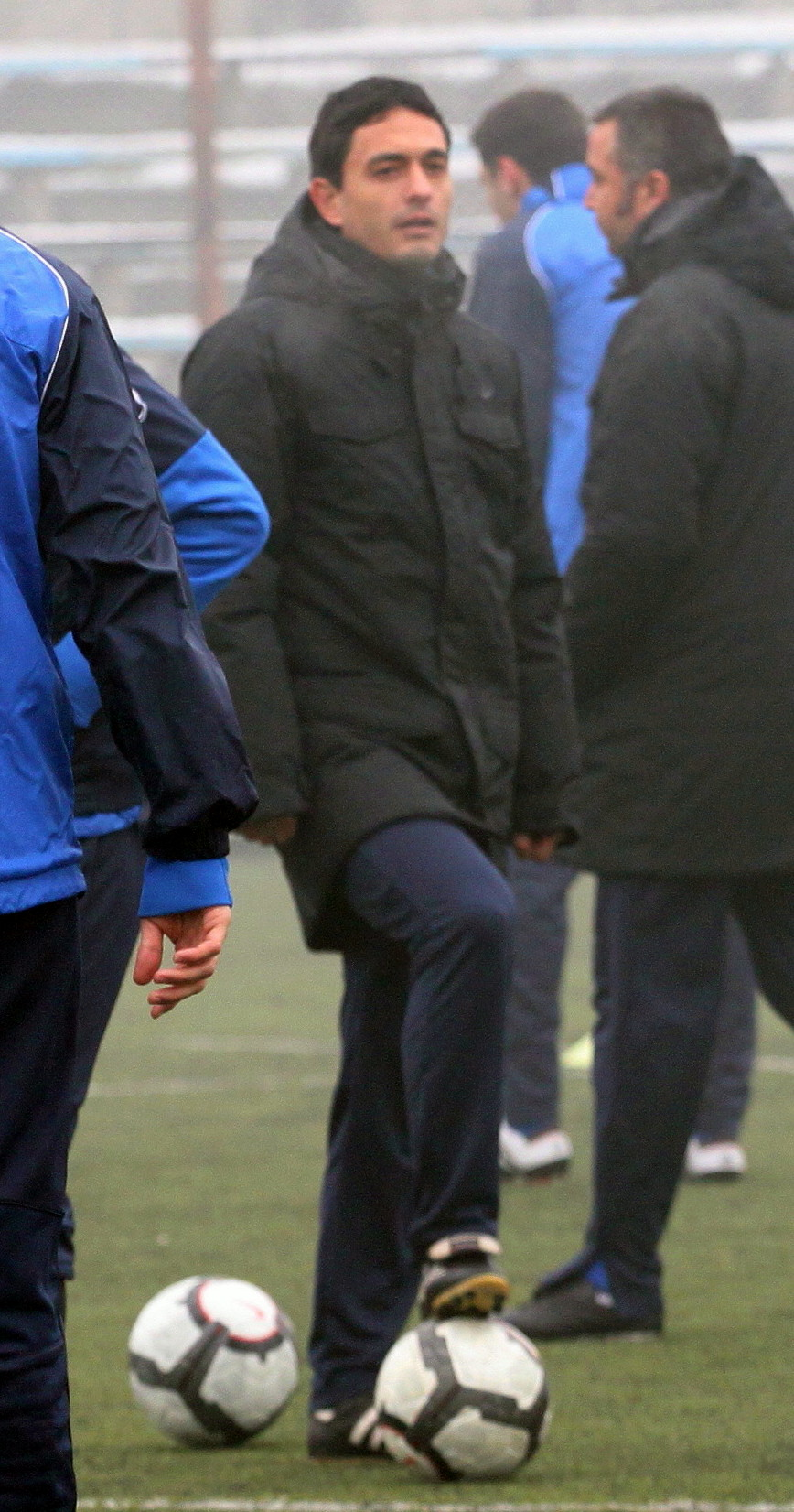

Personal information
- Date of birth: 9 July 1974 (age 52)
- Place of birth: Bourgas, Bulgaria
- Position: Attacking midfielder

Team information
- Current team: Nesebar (manager)

Senior career*
Years	Team	Apps	(Gls)
1993–1996	Naftex	48	(5)
1996–2002	Chernomorets Burgas	155	(22)
2002–2004	Naftex	34	(8)
2009–2010	Neftochimic 1986	?	(?)

International career
	Bulgaria U21	6	(1)

Managerial career
- 2010–2011: Levski Sofia (assistant)
- 2013–2016: SJZ Yongchang (assistant)
- 2016–2017: BJ Enterprises (assistant)
- 2017: HN Jianye (assistant)
- 2018–2019: SJZ Ever Bright (assistant)
- 2022: Krumovgrad (assistant)
- 2022–2023: CSKA 1948 (assistant)
- 2023–2024: Chernomorets Burgas (assistant)
- 2024–2025: Krumovgrad (assistant)
- 2025: Krumovgrad
- 2025–: Nesebar
- * Club domestic league appearances and goals

Miroslav Kosev (Bulgarian: Мирослав Косев) (born 9 July 1974) is a former Bulgarian footballer who currently works as a manager for Nesebar.

== Career ==
Kosev spent his whole career in Bulgarian football, playing for the two main Burgas-based teams. Following his retirement, he turned to coaching.
