= Yanko Georgiev =

Bulgarian footballer

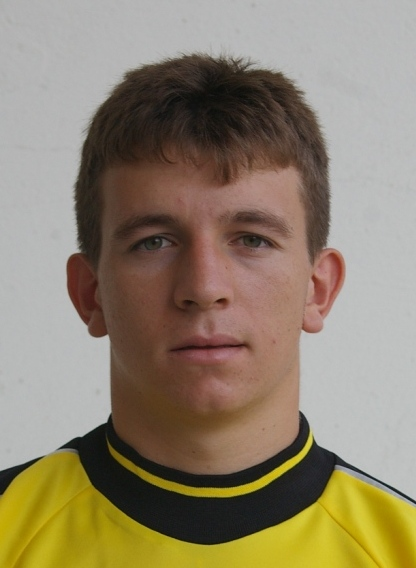

Personal information
- Full name: Yanko Ivanov Georgiev
- Date of birth: 22 October 1988 (age 38)
- Place of birth: Burgas, Bulgaria
- Height: 1.86 m (6 ft 1 in)
- Position: Goalkeeper

Team information
- Current team: Arda
- Number: 22

Youth career
- Chernomorets Burgas

Senior career*
Years	Team	Apps	(Gls)
2005–2006	Pomorie	24	(0)
2006–2008	Chernomorets Burgas	19	(0)
2008–2009	Naftex Burgas	23	(0)
2009–2011	Pomorie	39	(0)
2011–2013	Chernomorets Burgas	6	(0)
2014	PFC Burgas	14	(0)
2015	Chernomorets Burgas	11	(0)
2015–2016	Pomorie	26	(0)
2016–2017	Neftochimic Burgas	27	(0)
2017–2019	Septemvri Sofia	48	(0)
2019–2021	Botev Plovdiv	30	(0)
2021	Tsarsko Selo	19	(0)
2022–2023	Pirin Blagoevgrad	37	(0)
2023–2025	Krumovgrad	66	(0)
2025–2026	Septemvri Sofia	32	(0)
2026–	Arda	0	(0)
- * Club domestic league appearances and goals as of 25 June 2026

Yanko Georgiev (Bulgarian: Янко Георгиев; born 22 October 1988) is a Bulgarian football goalkeeper who currently plays for Arda Kardzhali.

== Career ==
=== Black Sea coast ===
Born in Burgas, Georgiev has played for locals Pomorie, Chernomorets Burgas, Naftex Burgas, Chernomorets Pomorie, PFC Burgas and Neftochimic Burgas.

With Neftochimic Burgas he signed on 15 June 2016 after the team was administratively promoted to the newly established Bulgarian First League, taking the place of A Group. He made his debut for the team on 21 August 2016 in a match against Beroe Stara Zagora keeping a clean sheet for the 1:0 win. On 20 September 2016 he played in the Bulgarian Cup match against Etar Veliko Tarnovo, won by Neftohimic after penalties. The team was on the relegate zone and on 2 June 2017 they played in a play-off against Vitosha Bistritsa were Neftochimic lost and relegate to Bulgarian Second League. After that most of the players, including Georgiev left the club due to the financial problems in the team.

=== Septemvri Sofia ===
On 18 June 2017 he signed with the newly promoted to Bulgarian First League team of Septemvri Sofia together with his teammates from Neftohimic last season - Ivan Valchanov and Vladislav Romanov. He made his debut for the team on 11 August 2017 coming on as a substitute after Valentin Galev received an injury in the 20th minute of the match against CSKA Sofia.

=== Krumovgrad ===
In June 2023, Georgiev joined newly promoted Krumovgrad.

=== Septemvri Sofia (second spell) ===
In June 2025, following Krumovgrad's relegation to the Second League and the lack of clarity regarding the future financial situation with the club, he returned to Septemvri Sofia.

=== Arda Kardzhali ===
In June 2026, Georgiev put pen to paper on a deal with Arda Kardzhali.

== Career statistics ==
=== Club ===
As of 27 October 2017

Club	Season	Division	League		Cup		Europe		Other		Total	
Club	Season	Division	Apps	Goals	Apps	Goals	Apps	Goals	Apps	Goals	Apps	Goals
Pomorie	2005–06	B Group	24	0	0	0	–		–		24	0
Chernomorets Burgas	2006–07	B Group	10	0	0	0	–		–		10	0
Chernomorets Burgas	2007–08	A Group	9	0	0	0	–		–		9	0
Naftex Burgas	2008–09	B Group	23	0	0	0	–		–		23	0
Pomorie	2009–10	B Group	24	0	3	0	–		–		27	0
Pomorie	2010–11	B Group	15	0	0	0	–		–		15	0
Chernomorets Burgas	2011–12	A Group	0	0	0	0	–		–		0	0
Chernomorets Burgas	2012–13	A Group	1	0	0	0	–		–		1	0
Chernomorets Burgas	2013–14	A Group	5	0	4	0	–		–		9	0
PFC Burgas	2014–15	B Group	14	0	1	0	–		–		15	0
Chernomorets Burgas	2014–15	B Group	11	0	0	0	–		–		11	0
Pomorie	2015–16	B Group	26	0	1	0	–		1	0	28	0
Neftochimic Burgas	2016–17	First League	27	0	1	0	–		4	0	32	0
Septemvri Sofia	2017–18	First League	10	0	2	0	–		–		12	0
Career statistics			199	0	12	0	0	0	5	0	216	0
