= FC Asenovets Asenovgrad =

Bulgarian football club

Asenovets
- Full name: Football Club Asenovets
- Founded: 1922; 103 years ago
- Ground: Shipka Stadium, Asenovgrad
- Capacity: 4,000
- Chairman: Borislav Velkov
- Manager: Yordan Kovachev
- League: South-East Third League
- 2021–22: South-East Third League, 5th
- Website: https://fcasenovets.com/
Home colours	Away colours

Football Club Asenovets (Bulgarian: Футболен клуб Асеновец) are a Bulgarian association football club based in Asenovgrad, Plovdiv Province, currently playing in the South-East Third League, the third level of Bulgarian football. Their home ground since 1949 has been Shipka Stadium. Known for its highly motivated supporters even in lower divisions.

== Current squad ==
As of 1 September 2015 Note: Flags indicate national team as defined under FIFA eligibility rules; some limited exceptions apply. Players may hold more than one non-FIFA nationality.

No.	Pos.	Nation	Player
1	GK	BUL	Stanimir Ivanov
3	DF	BUL	Rumen Enkov
4	DF	BUL	Alpay Murad
5	DF	BUL	Aleksandar Hristev
7	DF	BUL	Dzhuneit Uzunov
8	MF	BUL	Ramadan Hayrula
9	MF	BUL	Todor Timonov
10	FW	BUL	Todor Todorov
11	FW	BUL	Nedzhip Nedzhip

No.	Pos.	Nation	Player
12	GK	BUL	Damyan Kadiev
13	DF	BUL	Viktor Kavardzhiev
14	DF	BUL	Vasil Paytalov
15	FW	BUL	Anton Kyulyunkov
18	FW	BUL	Aleksandar Stoychev
20	MF	BUL	Borislav Karamatev
91	DF	BUL	Yordan Tomov
99	FW	BUL	Borislav Hadzhiev

== Shipka stadium ==
Shipka stadium is a multi-use stadium in Asenovgrad, Bulgaria. It is currently used mostly for football matches and is the home ground of F.C. Asenovets. The stadium holds 3,852 people.
