= Stefan Genov =

Bulgarian football manager (born 1956)

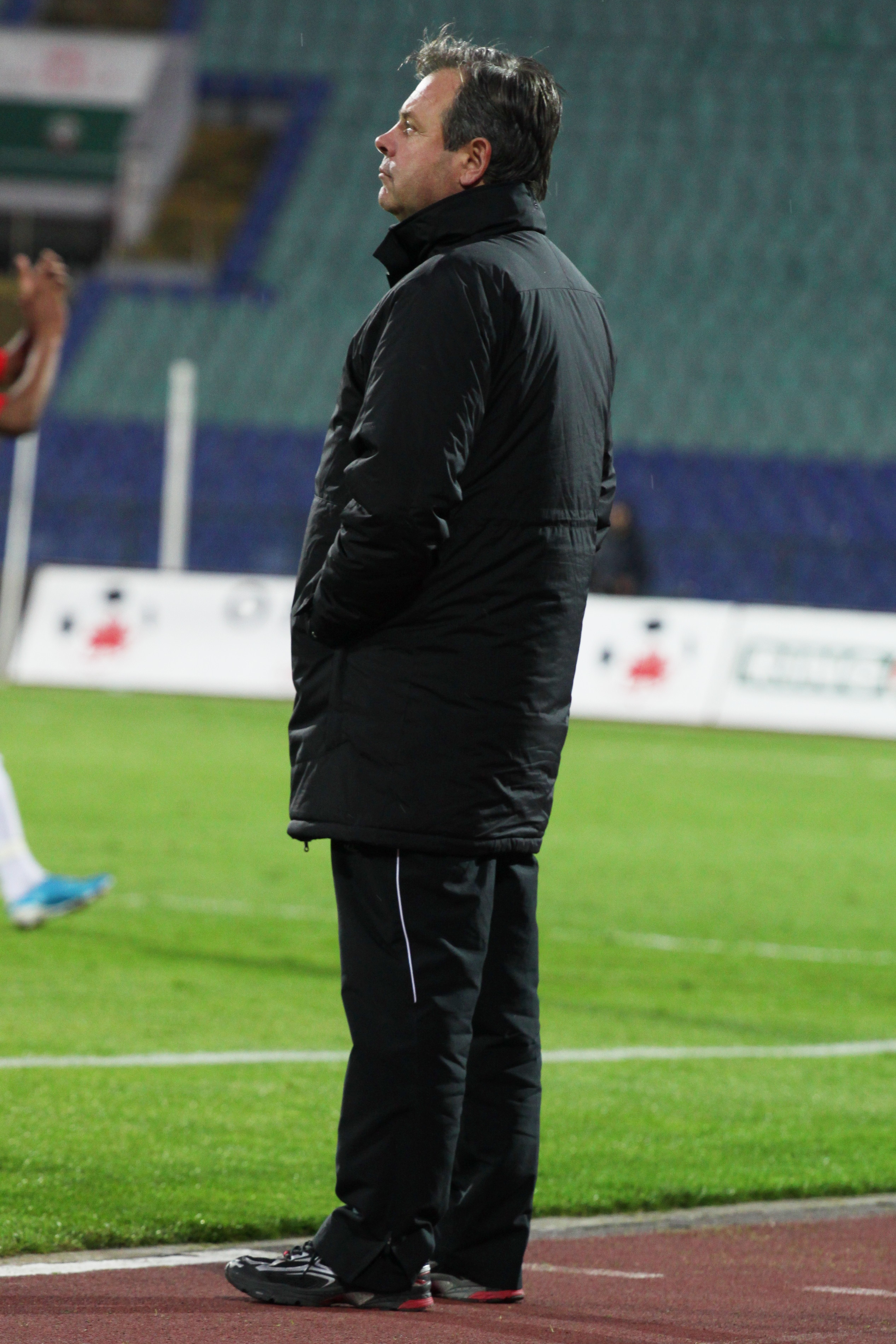

Personal information
- Full name: Stefan Asenov Genov
- Date of birth: 23 June 1956 (age 70)
- Place of birth: Plovdiv, Bulgaria

Managerial career
- Years: Team
- 1976–1979: Torpedo Karlovo
- 1979–1980: Slanchev Bryag
- 1980–1981: Minyor Rudozem
- 1981–1983: Slanchev Bryag
- 1983–2001: Lokomotiv Plovdiv (youth team)
- 2001–2002: Al-Ittihad Aleppo
- 2002–2003: Hurriya SC
- 2003–2004: Al-Taliya
- 2004–2005: Al-Jehad
- 2006–2009: Lokomotiv Plovdiv (youth team)
- 2009: Lokomotiv Plovdiv
- 2010–2012: Cherno More
- 2012–2013: Lokomotiv Plovdiv
- 2013: CSKA Sofia (assistant)
- 2013–2014: Lokomotiv Sofia
- 2014–2015: Ludogorets Razgrad (assistant)
- 2016–2017: Pirin Blagoevgrad
- 2017–2018: CSKA Sofia (assistant)
- 2019-2025: Montana

Stefan Asenov Genov (Bulgarian: Стефан Асенов Генов) (born 23 June 1956) is a Bulgarian football manager. In his career, he has managed Lokomotiv Sofia, Lokomotiv Plovdiv, and Cherno More.

== Manager career ==
Genov started his career as manager at age of 20 as manager of Torpedo. He was later manager of Slanchev Bryag and Minyor Rudozem, before joining Lokomotiv Plovdiv youth teams, where he managed different teams for 24 years. After that for 5 years he managed teams in Syria. In 2012, he became champion with Al-Ittihad Aleppo and led Al-Taliya in AFC Champions League. He joined again Lokomotiv Plovdiv youth academy, before becoming caretaker manager of the first team in 2009. In 2010, he became manager of Cherno More and led the team until 24 September 2012.

On 5 August 2013 he was announced as manager of Lokomotiv Sofia. From 2014 he served as assistant manager of Georgi Dermendzhiev in Ludogorets Razgrad.

== Managerial statistics ==
As of 20 December 2015

Team	From	To	Record							
Team	From	To	G	W	D	L	Win %	GF	GA	GD
(Bulgaria) Lokomotiv Plovdiv	1 November 2009	26 December 2009	4	0	1	3	0.00	3	13	−10
(Bulgaria) Cherno More	30 October 2010	24 September 2012	55	27	12	16	49.09	71	46	+25
(Bulgaria) Lokomotiv Plovdiv	13 October 2012	30 June 2012	22	9	4	9	40.91	26	23	+3
(Bulgaria) Lokomotiv Sofia	5 August 2013	7 April 2014	32	15	4	13	46.88	40	44	−4
Total			113	51	21	41	45.13	140	126	+14
