= Compass Cargo Airlines =

Bulgarian cargo airline

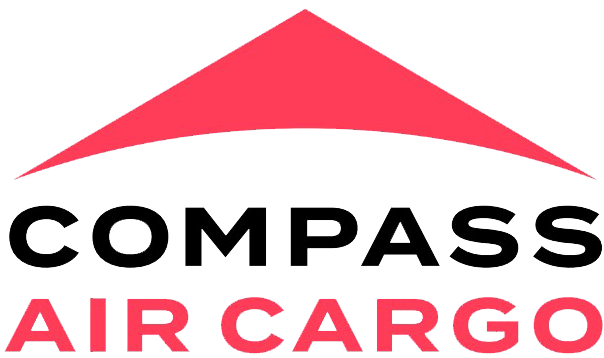

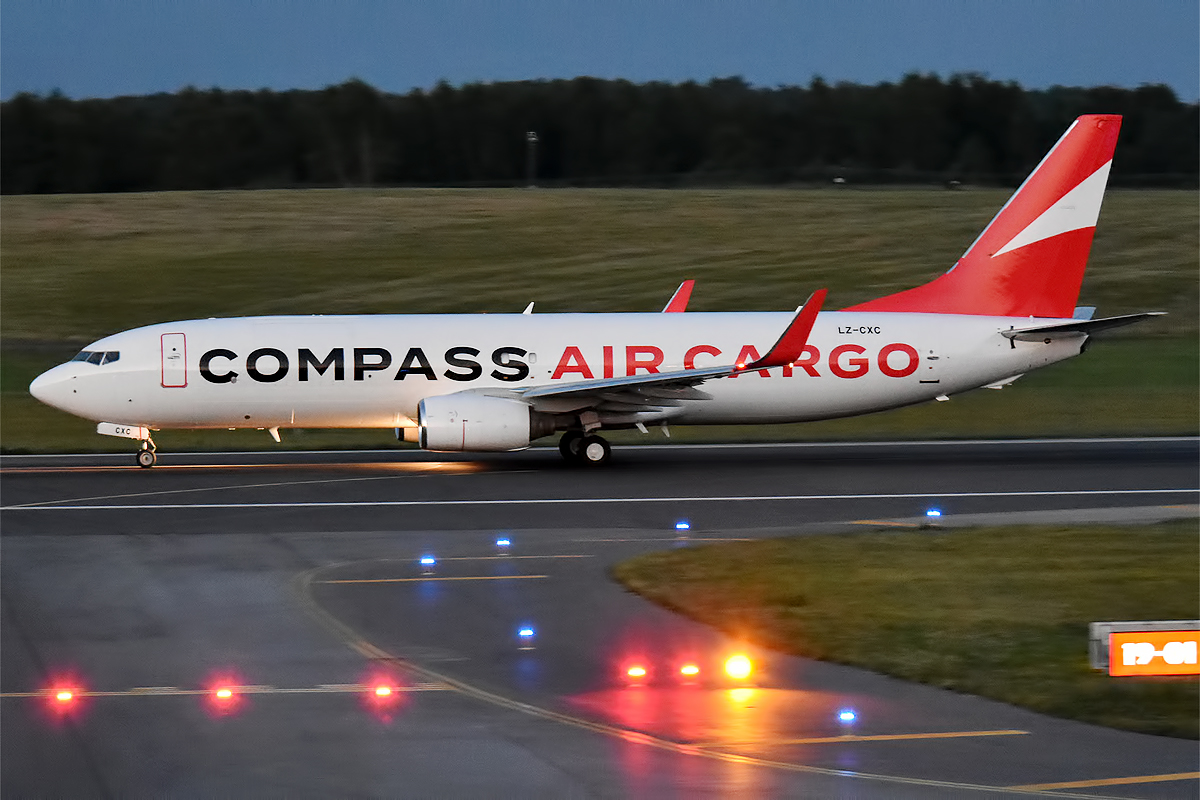
- Boeing 737-800SF
IATA	ICAO	Call sign
HQ	ADZ	MIGRATOR
- Founded: 2021
- Commenced operations: 2021
- AOC #: BG34
- Fleet size: 7
- Headquarters: Sofia
- Website: compasscargo.eu

Compass Cargo Airlines (also branded as Compass Air Cargo) is a Bulgarian cargo airline. Founded in 2021 and activated in that same year, the company operates four Boeing 737-800SF and three Boeing 747-400F.

== Fleet ==
As of August 2025, Compass Cargo Airlines operates the following aircraft:

Compass Cargo Airlines fleet
Aircraft	In service	Orders	Notes
Boeing 737-800SF	4	1	
Boeing 747-400F	1	—	
Boeing 747-400ERF	2	—	
Total	7	1	
