= Velislav Vutsov =

Bulgarian footballer and manager

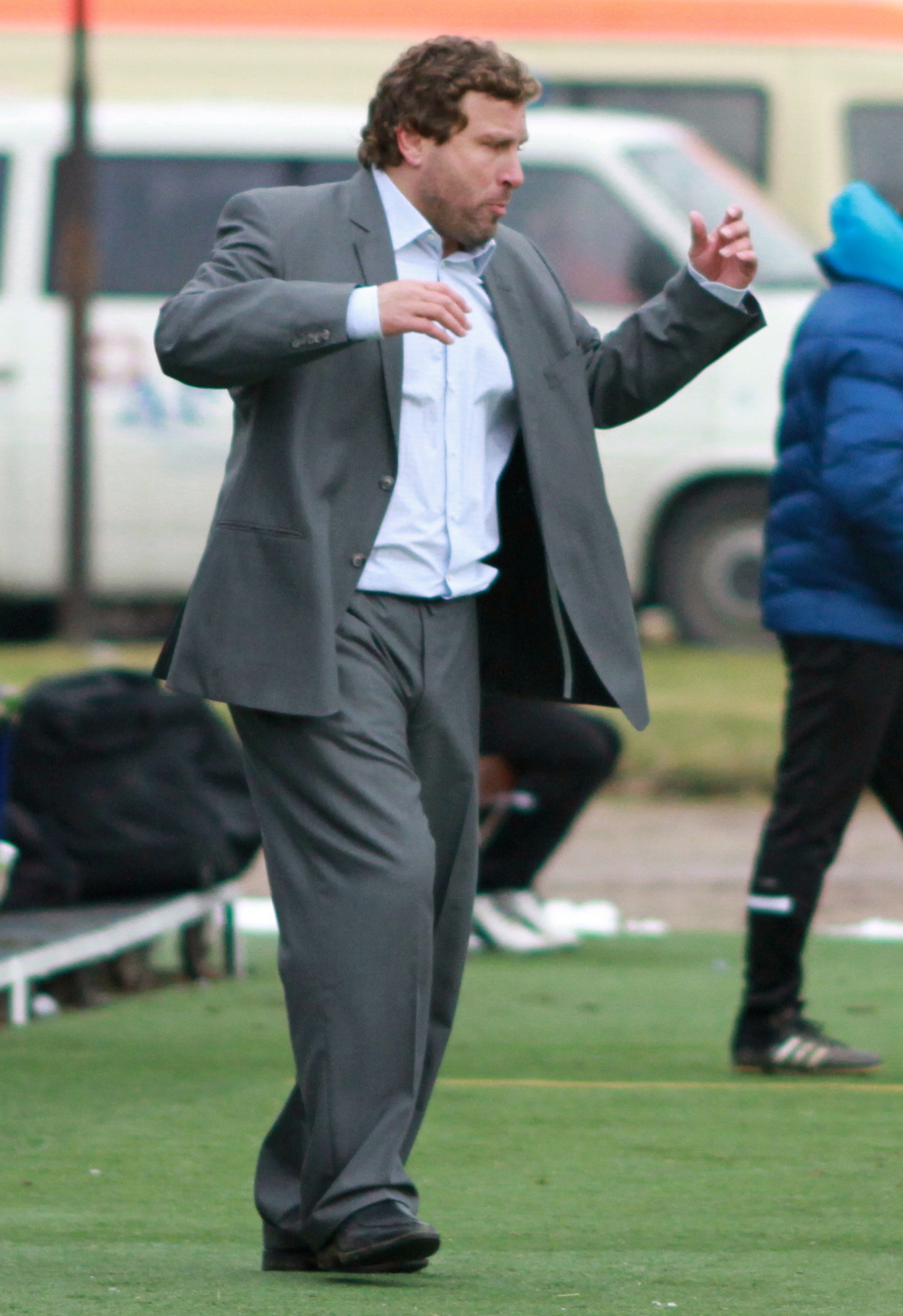

Personal information
- Full name: Velislav Ivanov Vutsov
- Date of birth: 19 July 1967 (age 59)
- Place of birth: Sofia, Bulgaria
- Position: Midfielder

Youth career
- 1977–1986: Levski Sofia

Senior career*
| Years | Team | Apps | (Gls) |
| 1986–1987 | Levski Sofia | 1 | (0) |
| 1988 | Spartak Varna | 8 | (2) |
| 1989–1990 | Slavia Sofia | 24 | (4) |
| 1990–1991 | Yantra Gabrovo | 16 | (0) |
| 1991 | Minyor Pernik | 7 | (0) |
| 1992 | Real Avilés | 7 | (0) |
| 1992 | Yantra Gabrovo | | |
| 1993 | Spartak Varna | 19 | (4) |
| 1994 | Lokomotiv Plovdiv | 1 | (0) |
| 1994–1995 | Akademik Sofia | | |
| 1995 | St. Pölten | 8 | (1) |
| 1996 | Cherno More | 17 | (5) |
| 1996–1997 | Avtotreid Aksakovo | | |
| 1997–1998 | Cherno More | 24 | (4) |
| 1998–1999 | Spartak Varna | 1 | (0) |

Managerial career
- 1999–2000: Spartak Varna
- 2000–2002: Spartak Pleven
- 2002–2004: Cherno More
- 2004–2005: Marek Dupnitsa
- 2006–2008: Kaliakra Kavarna
- 2008: Levski Sofia
- 2009–2010: Slavia Sofia
- 2012–2013: Slavia Sofia
- 2014: Botev Plovdiv
- 2018: Tsarsko Selo
- 2022: Krumovgrad
- 2023–2024: Yantra Gabrovo
- 2025: Hebar Pazardzhik
- 2026: Minyor Pernik
- * Club domestic league appearances and goals

Velislav Ivanov Vutsov (Bulgarian: Велислав Иванов Вуцов; born 19 July 1967) is a Bulgarian football manager and former footballer. He is also the son of former footballer Ivan Vutsov.

== Career ==
Throughout his career, he has been the manager of the following football teams: Spartak Pleven, Spartak Varna, Yantra Gabrovo, Cherno More Varna, Marek Dupnitsa, Kaliakra Kavarna and Levski Sofia. On 8 May 2008 he was assigned as the new manager of PFC Levski Sofia, seeing his "dream posting" occur, only to be fired after 2 official matches on 13 August 2008, after Levski Sofia's 0–1 home loss in Champions League qualifying to BATE Borisov.

On 8 March 2009, he began work as a sports commentator on the "Sports Mania" show alongside Krum Savov.

In late November 2012, he was appointed as the head coach of Slavia Sofia, replacing Martin Kushev. Vutsov was dismissed in June 2013.

== Personal life ==
He and his wife Svetlana have three sons - Ivan, Petar, and Svetoslav, with the latter two also playing professional football. Vutsov is a graduate of the National Sports Academy and has a degree in sports journalism.

== Manager ==
| Team | From | To | Record | | | | | | | |
| Team | From | To | G | W | D | L | Win % | F | A | Goal +/- |
|---|---|---|---|---|---|---|---|---|---|---|
| Levski Sofia | May 2008 | August 2008 | 2 | 0 | 0 | 2 | 0.00 | 0 | 2 | −2 |

As of 17 May 2009, includes all official matches – Bulgarian League, Bulgarian Cup (+ overtime) and international tournament games.
