= Stadion Bistritsa =

Bulgarian multi-use stadium

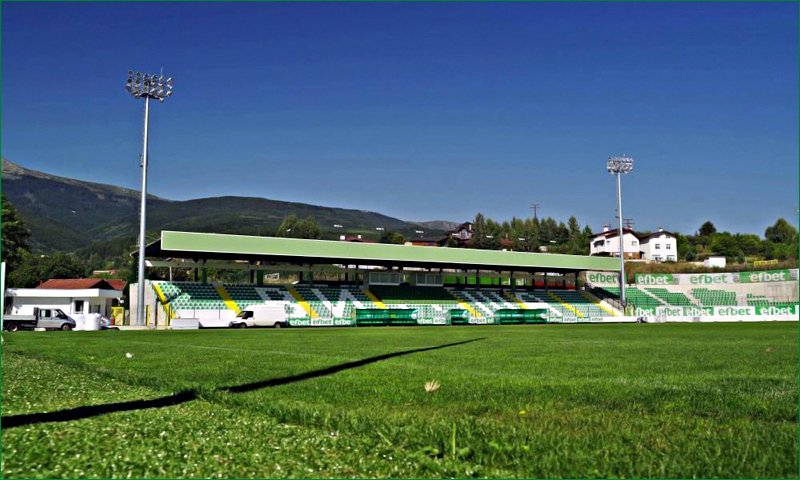
- Interactive map of Stadion Bistritsa
- Location: Bistritsa, Sofia, Bulgaria
- Coordinates: 42°35′28.5″N 23°21′48.3″E
- Operator: Vitosha Bistritsa
- Capacity: 4,000
- Surface: Grass
- Field size: 105 m × 68 m (344 ft × 223 ft)

Construction
- Opened: 1958
- Renovated: 2007; 2017
- Expanded: 2017

Tenants
- Vitosha Bistritsa (2007–present); Septemvri Sofia (2017–2019); CSKA 1948 (2021–present)

Stadion Bistritsa (Bulgarian: Стадион „Бистрица“, English: 'Bistritsa Stadium') is a multi-purpose stadium in Bistritsa, Sofia, Bulgaria. It is currently used for football matches and is the home ground of the local football clubs Vitosha Bistritsa, CSKA 1948 and formerly Septemvri Sofia. The stadium has a seating capacity of 4,000 spectators.

== History ==
Following the team's promotion to the Bulgarian First League, the stadium was reconstructed in order to acquire permissions from the Bulgarian Football Union's licensing committee to stage matches for the upcoming season. In 2017 Septemvri Sofia announced that they will move to the stadium until their new ground is built.

From 2021, CSKA 1948 also began using the stadium as their primary home venue for matches in the First League.
