= List of Bulgarian football transfers summer 2025 =

This is a list of Bulgarian football transfers for the 2025 summer transfer window. Only transfers involving a team from the two professional leagues, First League and Second League are listed.

== First League ==
=== Arda ===
In:

No.	Pos.	Nation	Player
8	FW	BUL	Atanas Kabov (from (Turkish Football Federation) Sakaryaspor)
9	FW	BUL	Georgi Nikolov (from Botev Plovdiv)
10	MF	BUL	Svetoslav Kovachev (from (Russia) Akhmat Grozny, previously on loan)
18	DF	AZE	Cəlal Hüseynov (loan return from (Association of Football Federations of Azerbaijan) Shamakhi)
39	MF	BUL	Antonio Vutov (from Spartak Varna)
45	FW	GNB	Isnaba Mané (on loan from (Portuguese Football Federation) Estoril)
70	MF	BUL	Ivelin Popov (from Botev Plovdiv)
99	MF	BUL	Birsent Karagaren (from CSKA 1948)

Out:

No.	Pos.	Nation	Player
7	MF	BUL	Stefan Statev (to Dunav Ruse)
9	FW	NGA	Chinonso Offor (to (Russian Football Union) Baltika Kaliningrad)
10	MF	BUL	Borislav Tsonev (to CSKA 1948)
19	FW	BUL	Tonislav Yordanov (to (Hungary) Kisvárda)
99	FW	BUL	Stanislav Ivanov (to Ludogorets Razgrad)

=== Beroe ===
In:

No.	Pos.	Nation	Player
2	DF	ARG	Vicente Longinotti (from (Italian Football Federation) Angizia Luco)
4	DF	BRA	Facundo Costantini (on loan from (Cyprus Football Association) AEL Limassol)
5	MF	BRA	Caio Lopes (from (Royal Spanish Football Federation) Arenteiro)
8	MF	EQG	Álex Masogo (from (Royal Spanish Football Federation) Yeclano)
9	FW	COL	Yesid Valbuena (from (Portuguese Football Federation) União Nogueirense)
10	FW	ESP	Daniel Bodega (from (Royal Spanish Football Federation) Fuenlabrada)
15	FW	ARG	Facundo Alarcón (from (Portuguese Football Federation) Académico de Viseu U23)
17	MF	ESP	Wesley Dual (from (Brazilian Football Confederation) Palmeiras U20)
23	DF	ESP	Tijan Sonha (from (Royal Spanish Football Federation) Bergantiños)
27	DF	GNB	Augusto Dabó (from (Portuguese Football Federation) Boavista)
99	GK	ARG	Valentino Quintero (from (Argentine Football Association) Rosario Central)

Out:

No.	Pos.	Nation	Player
2	DF	ESP	Oier Sarriegi (to (Football Federation of Kosovo) Drenica)
4	DF	ARG	Franco Ramos Mingo (to (Football Association of Indonesia) PSIM Yogyakarta)
5	DF	ARG	Luciano Squadrone (to (Albanian Football Federation) Flamurtari)
7	FW	URU	Francisco Sagardia (released)
8	MF	ARG	Segundo Pachamé (to (Uruguayan Football Association) Plaza Colonia)
9	FW	ARG	Santiago Godoy (to CSKA Sofia)
10	MF	BRA	Werick Caetano (to (Italian Football Federation) Sancataldese)
15	DF	ARG	Enzo Espinoza (to Lokomotiv Plovdiv)
23	MF	ARG	Kevin Ceijas (to (Iraq Football Association) Erbil)
32	MF	ARG	Thiago Ceijas (to (Moldovan Football Federation) Zimbru Chișinău)
96	GK	POR	Rúben Rendeiro (to (Portuguese Football Federation) Trofense)

=== Botev Plovdiv ===
In:

No.	Pos.	Nation	Player
1	GK	BUL	Hristiyan Slavkov (from Cherno More)
4	DF	CRO	Nikola Soldo (free agent)
8	MF	BUL	Todor Nedelev (on loan from Ludogorets Razgrad)
9	FW	BUL	Dimitar Mitkov (from Spartak Varna)
10	FW	BRA	Tales José da Silva (from (Brazilian Football Confederation) Retrô)
11	FW	BRA	Tailson (from (Romanian Football Federation) Politehnica Iași)
15	DF	BRA	Gabriel Noga (from (Portuguese Football Federation) Leixões)
20	FW	BUL	Steven Petkov (from (Portuguese Football Federation) Feirense)
22	DF	FRA	Enock Kwateng (free agent)
23	FW	IRL	Armstrong Oko-Flex (from (Swiss Football Association) Zürich)
27	MF	BUL	Emil Martinov (from Slavia Sofia)
28	MF	POR	Henrique Jocú (from (Israel Football Association) Hapoel Tel Aviv)
29	GK	BUL	Daniel Naumov (from (Hellenic Football Federation) OFI)
30	FW	BRA	Franklin Mascote (from (Brazilian Football Confederation) Retrô)
87	DF	BUL	Simeon Petrov (from (Hungarian Football Federation) Fehérvár)
90	FW	NGA	Samuel Kalu (free agent)

Out:

No.	Pos.	Nation	Player
1	GK	DEN	Hans Christian Bernat (to (German Football Association) Karlsruher SC)
4	DF	NGA	Ehije Ukaki (to (The Football Association) Sheffield United)
5	DF	EST	Joonas Tamm (to (Romanian Football Federation) Sepsi)
7	FW	NGA	Samuel Akere (to (Polish Football Association) Widzew Łódź)
9	FW	BUL	Georgi Nikolov (to Arda)
10	MF	BUL	Ivelin Popov (to Arda)
11	FW	NGA	Anthony Ujah (retired)
13	MF	ARM	Edgar Piloyan (to (Football Federation of Armenia) Van)
14	MF	CIV	Baba N'Diaye (to (Russian Football Union) Chelyabinsk)
15	DF	BUL	Dimitar Avramov (to Chernomorets Burgas)
16	MF	LTU	Matijus Remeikis (to (Lithuanian Football Federation) Hegelmann)
18	FW	GHA	John Batigi (to (Danish Football Association) Horsens)
20	MF	ESP	Antonio Perera (end of contract)
24	DF	NED	Jasper van Heertum (released)
28	MF	BUL	Yanis Karabelyov (to (Football Association of Serbia) Partizan)
32	GK	EST	Matvei Igonen (to (Swedish Football Association) Degerfors)
52	DF	NED	Jamal Amofa (to (Royal Dutch Football Association) Cambuur)
79	DF	BUL	Atanas Chernev (to (Portuguese Football Federation) Estrela da Amadora)
88	MF	SVN	Alen Korošec (to (Football Association of Slovenia) Mura)
91	FW	CMR	Vinni Triboulet (released)
99	FW	MNE	Aleksa Maraš (on loan to (Hellenic Football Federation) Panserraikos)
—	DF	CIV	Siriky Diabate (to (Qatar Football Association) Muaither SC, previously on loan to Botev Vratsa)

=== Botev Vratsa ===
In:

No.	Pos.	Nation	Player
1	GK	BUL	Lyubomir Vasilev (loan return from Lovech)
2	DF	SRB	Nikola Vlajković (from (Football Federation of Macedonia) Struga)
7	MF	BUL	Bozhidar Penchev (from Hebar)
12	MF	BUL	Iliya Yurukov (from (Football Association of Serbia) Radnički Niš)
14	MF	PAN	Romeesh Ivey (from Spartak Varna)
17	MF	USA	Jose Gallegos (from (Danish Football Association) Sønderjyske)
20	FW	FRA	Aymen Souda (from Pirin Blagoevgrad)
21	MF	BUL	Radoslav Tsonev (from (Kazakhstan Football Federation) Tobol)
22	MF	BUL	Antoan Stoyanov (from Levski Sofia, previously on loan)
25	GK	BUL	Dimitar Evtimov (from CSKA Sofia, previously on loan)
36	DF	BUL	Milen Stoev (from Spartak Varna)
77	DF	BUL	Rosen Marinov (from CSKA Sofia II)
79	FW	BUL	Martin Petkov (from Lokomotiv Plovdiv)
91	MF	UKR	Danylo Polonskyi (free agent)

Out:

No.	Pos.	Nation	Player
2	DF	MAR	Hamza Ait Allal (to (Royal Moroccan Football Federation) MAS Fès)
6	MF	ESP	David Suárez (to (German Football Association) Wehen Wiesbaden)
7	FW	BUL	Mark-Emilio Papazov (loan return to CSKA Sofia II)
10	MF	BUL	Spas Georgiev (on loan to Sportist Svoge)
14	FW	BUL	Preslav Bachev (loan return to Levski Sofia)
15	FW	BUL	Miroslav Marinov (to Fratria)
16	GK	BEN	Saturnin Allagbé (to (French Football Federation) Chauray)
19	FW	COL	Brayan Perea (to (Football Association of Thailand) Port)
27	DF	CIV	Siriky Diabate (loan return to Botev Plovdiv)
28	MF	FRA	Quentin Bena (to (French Football Federation) Châteauroux)
29	DF	BUL	Martin Bachev (released)
34	GK	COL	Federico Barrios (released)
98	MF	BRA	Ewerton Potiguar (released)
—	MF	BUL	Chavdar Ivaylov (to Etar, previously on loan to Belasitsa Petrich)

=== Cherno More ===
In:

No.	Pos.	Nation	Player
9	FW	BRA	Gustavo França (from (Portuguese Football Federation) União de Santarém)
10	MF	BUL	Asen Chandarov (from Levski Sofia)
11	MF	BRA	João Pedro (from (Royal Spanish Football Federation) Linense)
19	FW	BUL	Georgi Lazarov (from Fratria)
20	MF	BRA	Phellipe Cardoso (from (Brazilian Football Confederation) Ibrachina)
24	MF	POR	David Teles (from (Portuguese Football Federation) Anadia)
26	DF	BRA	João Bandaró (from (Brazilian Football Confederation) Ibrachina)
77	FW	POR	Celso Sidney (from (Portuguese Football Federation) Lusitânia)
81	GK	BUL	Kristian Tomov (from Lokomotiv Plovdiv)

Out:

No.	Pos.	Nation	Player
5	MF	ARG	Nacho Pais (to (Uruguayan Football Association) Danubio)
6	DF	BUL	Viktor Popov (to (Polish Football Association) Korona Kielce)
7	FW	BRA	Breno Teixeira (to (Brazilian Football Confederation) América Mineiro)
9	FW	BUL	Ismail Isa (released)
10	MF	FRA	Mazire Soula (to Levski Sofia)
11	FW	GUI	Thierno Barry (loan return to (Cyprus Football Association) Enosis Neon Paralimni)
27	DF	BUL	Daniel Dimov (retired)
84	GK	BUL	Hristiyan Slavkov (to Botev Plovdiv)
98	FW	FRA	Derick Osei (end of contract)
—	MF	BUL	Martin Banev (on loan to Sevlievo, previously on loan to Lovech)

=== CSKA Sofia ===
In:

No.	Pos.	Nation	Player
2	DF	BRA	Pastor (from (Portuguese Football Federation) Farense)
6	MF	POR	Bruno Jordão (from (Polish Football Association) Radomiak Radom)
8	MF	SWE	David Seger (from (Swedish Football Association) Östers IF)
9	FW	ARG	Santiago Godoy (from Beroe)
11	MF	FRA	Mohamed Brahimi (from (Russian Football Union) Fakel Voronezh)
14	DF	BUL	Teodor Ivanov (from CSKA 1948)
17	DF	ARG	Ángelo Martino (from (Argentine Football Association) Newell's Old Boys)
22	FW	ALB	Kevin Dodaj (from (Albanian Football Federation) Vllaznia)

Out:

No.	Pos.	Nation	Player
6	DF	SCO	Liam Cooper (released)
8	MF	BUL	Stanislav Shopov (to (Croatian Football Federation) Osijek)
10	MF	NOR	Jonathan Lindseth (to (Turkish Football Federation) Manisa F.K.)
11	FW	GLP	Matthias Phaëton (on loan to (Swiss Football Association) Zürich)
11	FW	KOS	Zymer Bytyqi (released)
15	DF	FRA	Thibaut Vion (released)
17	MF	COD	Jason Lokilo (to (Polish Football Association) Piast Gliwice)
18	DF	LUX	Mica Pinto (released)
25	GK	BUL	Ivan Dyulgerov (to (Moldovan Football Federation) Sheriff Tiraspol)
26	MF	COL	Marcelino Carreazo (to (Cyprus Football Association) Apollon Limassol)
45	FW	BEL	Aaron Leya Iseka (released)
—	GK	BUL	Dimitar Evtimov (to Botev Vratsa, previously on loan)

=== CSKA 1948 ===
In:

No.	Pos.	Nation	Player
3	DF	ESP	Juan Carrión (from (Royal Spanish Football Federation) Antequera)
4	DF	GER	André Hoffmann (from (German Football Association) Fortuna Düsseldorf)
5	DF	MAR	Benaissa Benamar (from (Royal Moroccan Football Federation) Raja Casablanca)
6	DF	BLR	Yegor Parkhomenko (from (Football Federation of Belarus) Neman Grodno)
8	MF	FRA	Yohann Magnin (from (French Football Federation) Clermont Foot)
10	MF	BUL	Borislav Tsonev (from Arda)
11	FW	BUL	Georgi Rusev (on loan from (Swiss Football Association) Sion)
13	GK	BUL	Dimitar Sheytanov (from Septemvri Sofia)
15	DF	TUN	Fourat Soltani (from (Tunisian Football Federation) US Monastir)
20	MF	ARG	Brian Sobrero (from (Bolivian Football Federation) Always Ready)
21	DF	GEO	Lasha Dvali (from (Cyprus Football Association) APOEL)
22	DF	MNE	Ognjen Gašević (from (Football Association of Montenegro) Budućnost Podgorica)
25	MF	GHA	Sharif Osman (on loan from (Ghana Football Association) Inter Millas)
51	FW	BOL	José Martínez (from (Bolivian Football Federation) San Antonio Bulo Bulo)
52	DF	BOL	Diego Medina (from (Bolivian Football Federation) Always Ready)
67	FW	POR	Frédéric Maciel (from (Romanian Football Federation) Oțelul Galați)
77	FW	BRA	Elias Franco (from (Portuguese Football Federation) Atlético Clube de Portugal)
88	DF	CIV	Adama Ardile Traoré (from (Ivorian Football Federation) Stade d'Abidjan)
93	FW	MTN	Mamadou Diallo (from (French Football Federation) Châteauroux)
94	FW	BUL	Atanas Iliev (from (Cyprus Football Association) Anorthosis)
96	DF	MNE	Dragan Grivić (from (Football Association of Montenegro) Budućnost Podgorica)
—	DF	FRA	Sadio Dembélé (from (German Football Association) VfR Aalen)

Out:

No.	Pos.	Nation	Player
2	DF	BRA	Johnathan (to (Football Association of Indonesia) Dewa United Banten)
3	DF	BUL	Mario Petkov (to Marek)
4	DF	BUL	Simeon Vasilev (on loan to Septemvri Sofia)
5	DF	BUL	Asen Georgiev (to Yantra Gabrovo)
6	MF	CMR	Kufre Eta (to (Football Association of Serbia) Vojvodina)
9	MF	BUL	Birsent Karagaren (to Arda)
10	FW	BUL	Radoslav Kirilov (to Levski Sofia)
11	MF	BRA	Cassiano Bouzon (on loan to Minyor Pernik)
12	GK	FRA	Lévi Ntumba (to Slavia Sofia)
14	DF	BUL	Teodor Ivanov (to CSKA Sofia)
18	FW	BUL	Boris Dimitrov (on loan to Montana)
19	DF	CPV	Steve Furtado (to (Romanian Football Federation) Farul Constanța)
21	MF	BUL	Emil Tsenov (to (Russian Football Union) Orenburg)
22	DF	BUL	Reyan Daskalov (to Lokomotiv Sofia)
23	DF	GHA	Christopher Acheampong (on loan to Montana)
25	FW	UKR	Yevhen Serdyuk (to (Vietnam Football Federation) Hong Linh Ha Tinh)
26	FW	BUL	Kaloyan Krastev (to Chernomorets Burgas)
33	MF	BEL	William Fonkeu (released)
40	FW	MKD	Mario Ilievski (to (Football Federation of Kosovo) Prishtina)
41	DF	ALG	Jonas Albenas (to (Luxembourg Football Federation) Atert Bissen)
70	FW	BRA	Dudu Hatamoto (released)
92	DF	CRO	Robert Marijanovic (to (Croatian Football Federation) NK Sesvete)
—	DF	FRA	Sadio Dembélé (on loan to Lokomotiv Sofia)
—	MF	BRA	Luann Augusto (on loan to Lokomotiv Sofia)
—	MF	TJK	Parvizdzhon Umarbayev (to Lokomotiv Plovdiv, previously on loan)

=== Dobrudzha ===
In:

No.	Pos.	Nation	Player
6	MF	POR	Diogo Madaleno (from (Portuguese Football Federation) Braga U23)
10	FW	SUI	Aaron Appiah (from (Swiss Football Association) FC Schaffhausen)
20	FW	BUL	Aykut Ramadan (from Slavia Sofia)
23	MF	SEN	Malick Fall (from Krumovgrad)
27	MF	TUN	Montassar Triki (from (Tunisian Football Federation) Espérance Tunis)
30	MF	SVN	Almin Kurtović (from (Football Association of Slovenia) Mura)
35	MF	CRO	Di Mateo Lovrić (from (Football Association of Slovenia) Koper)
37	DF	BUL	Ventsislav Kerchev (from Slavia Sofia)
45	DF	BUL	Dzhan Hasan (from Dunav Ruse)
70	DF	BUL	Kolyo Stanev (from Etar)
77	DF	BRA	Matheus Leoni (from (Italian Football Federation) Lanusei)
82	MF	POR	Tomás Silva (from (Polish Football Association) Jagiellonia Białystok)
88	MF	BUL	Krasian Kolev (from Botev Plovdiv II)
—	DF	ESP	Ángel Puerto (from (Royal Spanish Football Federation) Atlético Sanluqueño)

Out:

No.	Pos.	Nation	Player
2	DF	BUL	Velislav Boev (to Yantra)
4	DF	BUL	Petko Ganev (to Hebar)
6	MF	BUL	Ivaylo Klimentov (to Vihren Sandanski)
10	MF	BUL	Rumen Rumenov (to Fratria)
11	MF	BUL	Dzhaner Sadetinov (to Fratria)
21	MF	BUL	Georgi Karakashev (to Hebar)
27	FW	BUL	Angel Angelov (released)
33	FW	BUL	Simeon Veshev (to Marek)
87	FW	BUL	Stefan Traykov (to Chernomorets Burgas)

=== Levski Sofia ===
In:

No.	Pos.	Nation	Player
22	MF	FRA	Mazire Soula (from Cherno More)
31	DF	MKD	Nikola Serafimov (from (Hungarian Football Federation) Fehérvár)
37	MF	BRA	Rildo (on loan from (Portuguese Football Federation) Santa Clara)
47	MF	ALG	Akram Bouras (from (Algerian Football Federation) MC Alger)
77	FW	BUL	Borislav Rupanov (loan return from Septemvri Sofia)
78	GK	BUL	Martin Lukov (free agent)
99	FW	BUL	Radoslav Kirilov (from CSKA 1948)

Out:

No.	Pos.	Nation	Player
5	DF	NED	Kellian van der Kaap (to (Qatar Football Association) Al-Sailiya)
9	FW	BUL	Aleksandar Kolev (to (Chinese Football Association) Nantong Zhiyun)
11	MF	ESP	Jawad El Jemili (to (Qatar Football Association) Al Shahaniya)
14	MF	BUL	Iliyan Stefanov (to Slavia Sofia)
44	GK	CRO	Matej Marković (released)
97	MF	FRA	Hassimi Fadiga (to (Kuwait Football Association) Al-Arabi)
—	MF	BUL	Antoan Stoyanov (to Botev Vratsa, previously on loan)
—	MF	BUL	Asen Chandarov (to Cherno More, previously on loan to Septemvri Sofia)
—	MF	NGA	Clement Ikenna (released, previously on loan to (Ukrainian Association of Football) Kryvbas Kryvyi Rih)
—	FW	BUL	Preslav Bachev (on loan to Dunav Ruse, previously on loan to Botev Vratsa)
—	FW	BUL	Stivan Stoyanchov (on loan to Etar)

=== Lokomotiv Plovdiv ===
In:

No.	Pos.	Nation	Player
2	DF	VEN	Adrián Cova (from Krumovgrad)
4	DF	ROU	Andrei Chindriș (from (Polish Football Association) Lechia Gdańsk)
6	DF	BUL	Martin Ruskov (from Belasitsa)
7	MF	BUL	Ivaylo Markov (from CSKA 1948 II)
10	MF	ARG	Francisco Politino (free agent)
17	MF	BUL	Martin Atanasov (from Marek)
21	DF	ARG	Enzo Espinoza (from Beroe)
29	FW	CIV	Christ Longville (from (Ivorian Football Federation) SOL FC)
39	MF	TJK	Parvizdzhon Umarbayev (from CSKA 1948, previously on loan)
40	GK	BIH	Petar Zovko (free agent)
44	DF	BUL	Nikolay Nikolaev (from Hebar)
91	DF	BRA	Lucas Ryan (from (Brazilian Football Confederation) Botafogo-SP)
94	MF	ROU	Cătălin Itu (from Krumovgrad)

Out:

No.	Pos.	Nation	Player
2	DF	NOR	Tobias Bjørnstad (released)
4	DF	BUL	Vidol Seymenski (to Levski Karlovo)
7	MF	BLR	Vladimir Medved (on loan to Slavia Sofia)
6	MF	BUL	Hristo Ivanov (to (Football Association of Serbia) Železničar Pančevo)
10	FW	BUL	Martin Petkov (to Botev Vratsa)
16	MF	BUL	Kristiyan Peshov (end of contract)
17	MF	BUL	Bozhidar Kostadinov (to Sekirovo)
19	MF	BUL	Martin Haydarov (to Yantra)
20	MF	POR	Diogo Abreu (to (Qatar Football Association) Al-Waab)
21	DF	POL	Patryk Stępiński (to (Polish Football Association) Miedź Legnica)
33	MF	BUL	Krastyo Banev (on loan to Etar)
44	DF	BUL	Angel Lyaskov (to Lokomotiv Sofia)
77	FW	SVN	Lovro Bizjak (released)
80	FW	BRA	Marcilio Lima (released)
81	GK	BUL	Kristian Tomov (to Cherno More)
91	DF	COL	Jorge Segura (to (Swiss Football Association) Zürich)

=== Lokomotiv Sofia ===
In:

No.	Pos.	Nation	Player
1	GK	BUL	Umut Habil (from Ludogorets Razgrad II)
4	DF	FRA	Sadio Dembélé (on loan from CSKA 1948)
3	DF	CGO	Messie Biatoumoussoka (from (Georgian Football Federation) Dinamo Batumi)
5	MF	BUL	Erol Dost (from Krumovgrad)
8	MF	BRA	Luann Augusto (on loan from CSKA 1948)
10	FW	BUL	Georgi Minchev (from (Turkish Football Federation) Manisa F.K.)
13	MF	BRA	Diego Raposo (from (United Arab Emirates Football Association) Al Dhafra)
14	DF	BUL	Angel Lyaskov (from Lokomotiv Plovdiv)
19	FW	BUL	Mitko Mitkov (from Septemvri Sofia)
22	DF	BUL	Reyan Daskalov (from CSKA 1948)
23	DF	BUL	Hristo Mitev (from Yantra)
26	DF	BUL	Krasimir Miloshev (from (Qatar Football Association) Al-Markhiya)
77	FW	BRA	Cauê Caruso (from (Brazilian Football Confederation) Linense)
99	GK	BUL	Martin Velichkov (from Spartak Varna)

Out:

No.	Pos.	Nation	Player
1	GK	BUL	Dragomir Petkov (to Hebar)
4	DF	BUL	Miki Orachev (to Minyor Pernik)
5	DF	GRE	Athanasios Pitsolis (end of contract)
12	DF	BRA	Bruno Franco (to (Association of Football Federations of Azerbaijan) Araz-Naxçıvan)
13	DF	POR	Celso Raposo (to (Portuguese Football Federation) Mafra)
18	FW	BUL	Svetoslav Dikov (to Hebar)
20	MF	POR	Diogo Teixeira (end of contract)
23	DF	BUL	Hristo Mitev (released)
25	FW	CPV	Gianni dos Santos (end of contract)
26	DF	FRA	Mamadou Diarra (end of contract)
77	FW	BUL	Erik Manolkov (to Fratria)
88	GK	BUL	Zharko Istatkov (on loan to Sportist Svoge)
94	FW	BUL	Yuliyan Nenov (to Marek)

=== Ludogorets Razgrad ===
In:

No.	Pos.	Nation	Player
2	DF	SWE	Joel Andersson (from (Danish Football Association) Midtjylland)
8	FW	FRA	Mounir Chouiar (loan return from (Swiss Football Association) Zürich)
10	FW	BRA	Matheus Machado (on loan from (Saudi Arabian Football Federation) Al Fateh)
14	MF	SRB	Petar Stanić (from (Football Association of Serbia) TSC)
26	MF	CZE	Filip Kaloč (from (German Football Association) 1. FC Kaiserslautern)
55	DF	ISR	Idan Nachmias (from (Israel Football Association) Maccabi Tel Aviv)
77	FW	BRA	Erick Marcus (from (Brazilian Football Confederation) Vasco da Gama, previously on loan)
99	FW	BUL	Stanislav Ivanov (from Arda)
—	DF	ARG	Franco Russo (loan return from (Mexican Football Federation) Querétaro)
—	DF	GAM	Noah Sonko Sundberg (loan return from (Turkish Football Federation) Sivasspor)
—	DF	ESP	Pipa (loan return from (Royal Spanish Football Federation) Burgos)

Out:

No.	Pos.	Nation	Player
6	MF	POL	Jakub Piotrowski (to (Italian Football Federation) Udinese)
8	MF	BUL	Todor Nedelev (on loan to Botev Plovdiv)
8	FW	FRA	Mounir Chouiar (to (Royal Moroccan Football Federation) Berkane)
10	FW	FRA	Antoine Baroan (loan return to (Swiss Football Association) Winterthur)
14	DF	ISR	Denny Gropper (end of contract, to (Israel Football Association) Maccabi Tel Aviv)
16	DF	NOR	Aslak Fonn Witry (to (Norwegian Football Federation) Rosenborg)
19	FW	BUL	Georgi Rusev (loan return to (Swiss Football Association) Sion)
55	DF	BRA	Pedro Henrique (to (Jordan Football Association) Al-Hussein)
—	DF	ARG	Franco Russo (to (Mexican Football Federation) Querétaro, previously on loan)
—	DF	GAM	Noah Sonko Sundberg (on loan to (Hellenic Football Federation) Aris)

=== Montana ===
In:

No.	Pos.	Nation	Player
1	GK	CPV	Márcio Rosa (from Hebar)
2	MF	SWE	Joel Berhane (from (Swiss Football Association) Schaffhausen)
3	MF	GRE	Ilias Iliadis (from Pirin Blagoevgrad)
6	MF	NOR	Vajebah Sakor (from (Hellenic Football Federation) PAS Lamia)
7	FW	BUL	Boris Dimitrov (on loan from CSKA 1948)
9	FW	NGA	Philip Ejike (loan return from (Royal Belgian Football Association) Eupen)
11	FW	BRA	Victor Oliveira (from Septemvri Sofia)
15	DF	GHA	Christopher Acheampong (on loan from CSKA 1948)
16	MF	POR	Tomás Azevedo (from (Portuguese Football Federation) Lusitânia)
20	DF	CRO	Arian Mršulja (from (Israel Football Association) Maccabi Jaffa)
25	DF	NGA	Solomon James (from Spartak Pleven)
25	MF	BUL	Nikolay Ganchev (from Marek)

Out:

No.	Pos.	Nation	Player
3	FW	BUL	Steven Kirilov (to Marek)
6	DF	BUL	Denis Dinev (released)
9	FW	GUI	Ibrahima Berete (to Marek)
11	FW	BUL	Martin Sorakov (loan return to Slavia Sofia)
15	MF	BUL	Kristian Taskov (to (German Football Association) TuS Mayen)
16	MF	BUL	Ivelin Georgiev (to Sportist Svoge)
20	DF	BUL	Borislav Vakadinov (to Marek)
22	MF	BUL	Stefan Kamenov (to Hebar)
24	FW	FRA	Wilfried Kouakou (to Marek)
25	MF	BUL	Nikolay Ganchev (to Hebar)

=== Septemvri Sofia ===
In:

No.	Pos.	Nation	Player
3	DF	ENG	Sebastian Wade (from (Royal Spanish Football Federation) Mallorca B)
5	MF	BUL	Yoan Baurenski (from Spartak Varna)
14	DF	BUL	Simeon Vasilev (on loan from CSKA 1948)
17	MF	MAD	Nicolas Fontaine (from (Royal Belgian Football Association) Lokeren)
18	FW	BUL	Marsel Bibishkov (from (Canadian Soccer Association) York United)
20	DF	BUL	Bozhidar Tomovski (from Yantra Gabrovo)
21	GK	BUL	Yanko Georgiev (from Krumovgrad)
23	DF	NED	Robin Schouten (from (Royal Dutch Football Association) Emmen)
24	FW	COM	Faiz Mattoir (from (Royal Dutch Football Association) Almere City)
25	FW	CAN	Ali Aruna (from (Portuguese Football Federation) Braga U23)
28	MF	BUL	Stoyan Stoichkov (from CSKA 1948 II)

Out:

No.	Pos.	Nation	Player
5	DF	BUL	Mihail Polendakov (to (The Football Association) Sheffield United)
8	MF	PAN	Martín Morán (to (United Arab Emirates Football Association) Fursan Hispania)
9	MF	BUL	Asen Chandarov (loan return to Levski Sofia)
10	MF	SSD	Manyumow Achol (to (Lithuanian Football Federation) DFK Dainava)
11	FW	BUL	Borislav Rupanov (loan return to Levski Sofia)
14	FW	BUL	Borislav Marinov (on loan to Dunav Ruse)
17	DF	MOZ	Alfons Amade (to (Scottish Football Association) Dunfermline)
19	FW	BUL	Mitko Mitkov (to Lokomotiv Sofia)
21	GK	BUL	Dimitar Sheytanov (to CSKA 1948)
22	FW	BRA	Victor Oliveira (to Montana)
23	FW	MKD	Nikola Velichkovski (to (Football Federation of Macedonia) AP Brera Strumica)
24	FW	EQG	Jordan Gutiérrez (to (Football Association of Bosnia and Herzegovina) Rudar Prijedor)
26	DF	NED	Xandro Schenk (to (Football Association of Indonesia) Persis Solo)

=== Slavia Sofia ===
In:

No.	Pos.	Nation	Player
4	DF	SRB	Nikola Savić (from (Football Association of Bosnia and Herzegovina) Velež Mostar)
5	DF	COM	Karim Attoumani (from (Ligue réunionnaise de football) Saint-Pierroise)
10	FW	ALG	Yanis Guermouche (from Hebar)
12	GK	FRA	Lévi Ntumba (from CSKA 1948)
13	MF	BUL	Iliyan Stefanov (from Levski Sofia)
19	FW	BUL	Toni Tasev (from (Turkish Football Federation) Erzurumspor)
21	MF	BLR	Vladimir Medved (on loan from Lokomotiv Plovdiv)
24	DF	BUL	Lazar Marin (from Krumovgrad)
87	DF	BUL	Diego Ferraresso (from (Romanian Football Federation) Gloria Buzău)

Out:

No.	Pos.	Nation	Player
4	DF	BUL	Viktor Genev (end of contract)
5	DF	BUL	Veljko Jelenković (to (Slovenia) Olimpija Ljubljana)
5	DF	COM	Karim Attoumani (released)
8	MF	BUL	Aykut Ramadan (to Dobrudzha)
10	FW	BUL	Vladimir Nikolov (to (Polish Football Association) Korona Kielce)
12	GK	BUL	Nikolay Krastev (end of contract)
19	MF	BUL	Chung Nguyen Do (to (Vietnam Football Federation) Ninh Binh)
27	MF	BUL	Emil Martinov (to Botev Plovdiv)
37	DF	BUL	Ventsislav Kerchev (to Dobrudzha)

=== Spartak Varna ===
In:

No.	Pos.	Nation	Player
1	GK	AUS	Iliya Shalamanov-Trenkov (from (Football Australia) Altona Magic)
2	DF	CRO	Lukas Magdjinski (from (Croatian Football Federation) NK Rudeš)
6	MF	BUL	Zhak Pehlivanov (from Dunav Ruse)
9	FW	BUL	Daniel Halachev (loan return from Lovech)
13	DF	MAD	Thierno Millimono (from (Luxembourg Football Federation) Mondorf-les-Bains)
17	MF	BUL	Tsvetoslav Marinov (loan return from Lovech)
19	MF	BUL	Emil Yanchev (from Sportist Svoge)
18	MF	AUS	Saad Moukachar (from (Football Australia) Altona Magic)
44	DF	BUL	Angel Granchov (on loan from Fratria)
50	DF	BUL	Ilker Budinov (from Hebar)
88	MF	BUL	Damyan Yordanov (from Botev Plovdiv II)
90	FW	MKD	Georg Stojanovski (from (Football Federation of Macedonia) Shkupi)
93	FW	FRA	Louis Pahama (from (Iraq Football Association) Diyala)

Out:

No.	Pos.	Nation	Player
4	DF	AUT	Felix Strauß (to (German Football Association) Jahn Regensburg)
5	MF	BUL	Yoan Baurenski (to Septemvri Sofia)
6	MF	BUL	Aleksandar Tsvetkov (to Fratria)
8	MF	SVK	Filip Lesniak (to (Danish Football Association) Kolding IF)
9	FW	BUL	Dimitar Mitkov (to Botev Plovdiv)
10	FW	JPN	Atsushi Kurokawa (loan return to (Japan Football Association) Machida Zelvia)
11	MF	BUL	Viktor Mitev (to Fratria)
14	FW	PAN	Romeesh Ivey (to Botev Vratsa)
16	MF	CRO	Christian Ilić (to (Football Association of Indonesia) Bhayangkara Presisi)
19	DF	BUL	Milen Stoev (to Botev Vratsa)
21	DF	GUI	Pa Konate (to (Football Association of Finland) KuPS)
39	MF	BUL	Antonio Vutov (to Arda)
44	DF	BUL	Angel Granchov (to Fratria)
45	MF	BUL	Daniel Nachev (to Strumska Slava)
50	DF	CRO	Mihael Zorica (to (Football Association of Slovenia) Brežice)
66	MF	GHA	Gideon Akuowua (to (Israel Football Association) Maccabi Jaffa)
76	GK	BUL	Martin Velichkov (to Lokomotiv Sofia)
77	DF	BUL	Lyuboslav Marinov (to Minyor Pernik)
89	GK	BUL	Nikola Videnov (to Etar)

== Second League ==
=== Belasitsa ===
In:

No.	Pos.	Nation	Player
12	GK	BUL	Aleksandar Karparov (from Pirin Gotse Delchev)
17	MF	BRA	Vinicius Sanches (from (Brazilian Football Confederation) Ibrachina)
19	DF	BUL	Hristo Petrov (from Pirin Blagoevgrad)
21	FW	BUL	Konstantin Yordanov (from Kyustendil)
88	DF	BUL	Milen Gamakov (from (Cyprus Football Association) Peyia 2014)
91	MF	BUL	Viktor Yanev (from Nesebar)

Out:

No.	Pos.	Nation	Player
5	DF	BUL	Martin Ruskov (to Lokomotiv Plovdiv)
11	MF	BUL	Chavdar Ivaylov (loan return to Botev Vratsa)
25	GK	BUL	Zahari Dimitrov (released)
55	MF	BUL	Vladimir Gogov (to Sportist Svoge)

=== Chernomorets Burgas ===
In:

No.	Pos.	Nation	Player
3	DF	POR	Yaya Dramé (from (Portuguese Football Federation) Lusitânia)
4	DF	BUL	Dimitar Avramov (from Botev Plovdiv)
10	FW	BUL	Dimitar Kostadinov (from (Italian Football Federation) Crotone)
11	FW	BUL	Kristian Dobrev (from Krumovgrad)
13	DF	BRA	Wennisson Correia (from (Brazilian Football Confederation) Guarany de Bagé)
15	MF	BUL	Svetoslav Slavov (from CSKA 1948 II)
29	FW	BUL	Kaloyan Krastev (from CSKA 1948)
66	MF	BUL	Georgi Staykov (from CSKA 1948 II)
87	FW	BUL	Stefan Traykov (from Dobrudzha)

Out:

No.	Pos.	Nation	Player
4	DF	BUL	Stoyan Kizhev (to Sozopol)
7	FW	BUL	Anton Uzunov (released)
8	MF	BUL	Dimo Bakalov (to Spartak Plovdiv)
12	GK	BUL	Vladislav Velichkov (to Neftochimic)
13	MF	BUL	Nikola Atanasov (released)
15	DF	BUL	Ramis Ismailov (to Neftochimic)
19	DF	BUL	Dimitar Zhekov (to Sozopol)
24	DF	BUL	Aleksandar Ganchev (released)
30	MF	BUL	Stanislav Malamov (to Hebar)

=== CSKA Sofia II ===
In:

No.	Pos.	Nation	Player
1	GK	BUL	Daniel Nikolov (from Dunav Ruse)
7	FW	BUL	Mark-Emilio Papazov (loan return from Botev Vratsa)
14	MF	BUL	Aleksandar Bozhilov (from Levski Sofia II)
19	FW	BUL	Martin Sorakov (from Slavia Sofia)
24	MF	BUL	Abdula Kichukov (from Pirin Gotse Delchev)

Out:

No.	Pos.	Nation	Player
5	DF	BUL	Rosen Marinov (to Botev Vratsa)
11	MF	BUL	Viktor Vasilev (to Minyor Pernik)
13	DF	BUL	Nikola Borisov (to Sevlievo)

=== Dunav Ruse ===
In:

No.	Pos.	Nation	Player
6	MF	BUL	Viktor Vasilev (from CSKA 1948 II)
7	MF	BUL	Stefan Statev (from Arda)
8	FW	ESP	Bilal El Bakkali (from (Andorran Football Federation) Santa Coloma)
9	FW	BUL	Preslav Bachev (on loan from Levski Sofia)
18	FW	FRA	Ibrahim Keita (from Krumovgrad)
23	GK	BUL	Georgi Kitanov (from Spartak Pleven)
70	FW	BUL	Hyusein Kelyovluev (from Ludogorets II)
77	DF	BRA	Áquila Monteiro (from (Brazilian Football Confederation) Novo Hamburgo)
99	FW	BUL	Borislav Marinov (on loan from Septemvri Sofia)

Out:

No.	Pos.	Nation	Player
1	GK	BUL	Daniel Nikolov (to CSKA Sofia II)
6	MF	BUL	Viktor Vasilev (to Etar)
9	FW	BUL	Georgio Dimitrov (end of contract)
20	FW	BUL	Yordan Dimitrov (end of contract)
21	MF	FRA	Kevin Bemanga (end of contract)
23	GK	MKD	Stefan Tasev (to (Football Federation of Macedonia) Tikvesh)
30	MF	BUL	Zhak Pehlivanov (to Spartak Varna)
45	DF	BUL	Dzhan Hasan (to Dobrudzha)
77	FW	CGO	Jonathan N'Sondé (end of contract)

=== Etar ===
In:

No.	Pos.	Nation	Player
2	DF	BUL	Petar Zografov (free agent)
6	MF	BUL	Plamen Tsonchev (from Spartak Plovdiv)
9	FW	BUL	Toma Ushagelov (from Rilski Sportist)
10	MF	BUL	Chavdar Ivaylov (from Botev Vratsa])
13	DF	BUL	Anastas Pemperski (from Ludogorets II)
18	MF	BUL	Krastyo Banev (on loan from Lokomotiv Plovdiv)
19	FW	BUL	Vasil Vasilev (from Haskovo)
23	GK	BUL	Nikola Videnov (from Spartak Varna)
25	DF	BUL	Dimitar Gospodinov (from Akademik Svishtov)
27	FW	BUL	Steven Stoyanchov (on loan from Levski Sofia II)
28	MF	BUL	Viktor Vasilev (from Dunav Ruse)

Out:

No.	Pos.	Nation	Player
3	MF	GHA	Sharif Osman (loan return to (Ghana Football Association) Inter Millas)
6	MF	BUL	Filip Angelov (to Rilski Sportist)
7	DF	BUL	Kolyo Stanev (to Dobrudzha)
9	FW	BUL	Preslav Yordanov (to Minyor Pernik)
11	FW	FRA	Lhoan Claudant (released)
12	GK	BUL	Stanislav Nistorov (to Vihren Sandanski)
25	DF	BUL	Dimitar Gospodinov (to Sozopol)
28	MF	BUL	Nikolay Yankov (to Akademik Svishtov)
—	FW	RSA	Jaisen Clifford (to (South African Football Association) Marumo Gallants, previously on loan to Sportist Svoge)

=== Fratria ===
In:

No.	Pos.	Nation	Player
1	GK	UKR	Hennadiy Hanyev (from Lokomotiv Gorna Oryahovitsa)
6	MF	BUL	Aleksandar Tsvetkov (from Spartak Varna)
7	MF	BUL	Ayvan Angelov (from Yantra Gabrovo)
8	MF	BUL	Rumen Rumenov (from Dobrudzha)
11	MF	BUL	Viktor Mitev (from Spartak Varna)
13	DF	BUL	Arhan Isuf (from Krumovgrad)
15	FW	BUL	Miroslav Marinov (from Botev Vratsa)
19	DF	BUL	Stoyan Pergelov (from (The Football Association) Birmingham City U21)
22	DF	ARM	Artur Danielyan (from (Football Federation of Armenia) West Armenia)
23	MF	UKR	Ivan Brikner (from (Polish Football Association) Sokół Kleczew)
44	DF	BUL	Angel Granchov (from Spartak Varna)
77	FW	BUL	Erik Manolkov (from Lokomotiv Sofia)
96	MF	BUL	Dzhaner Sadetinov (from Dobrudzha)
98	FW	BUL	Valentin Yoskov (from Pirin Blagoevgrad)

Out:

No.	Pos.	Nation	Player
1	GK	BUL	Stefan Petkov (to Benkovski Isperih)
5	DF	BUL	Vasil Dobrev (to Volov Shumen)
8	MF	BUL	Steliyan Dobrev (on loan to Sevlievo)
13	DF	BUL	Galin Minkov (released)
28	FW	BUL	Lachezar Voykov (to Chernomorets Balchik)
69	MF	FRA	Dylan Junior Abé (released)
77	FW	BUL	Georgi Lazarov (to Cherno More)

=== Hebar ===
In:

No.	Pos.	Nation	Player
1	GK	BUL	Boris Gruev (from Yantra Gabrovo)
2	MF	BUL	Stefan Kamenov (from Montana)
7	MF	BUL	Momchil Tsvetanov (from Krumovgrad)
8	MF	BUL	Georgi Karakashev (from Dobrudzha)
10	MF	BUL	Dimitar Zakonov (from Sportist Svoge)
11	DF	BUL	Petko Ganev (from Dobrudzha)
15	FW	BUL	Svetoslav Dikov (from Lokomotiv Sofia)
17	DF	BUL	Georgi Valchev (from Lokomotiv Gorna Oryahovitsa)
19	DF	BUL	Mario Dadakov (from Minyor Pernik)
20	DF	BUL	Viktor Lyubenov (on loan from Levski Sofia II)
21	MF	BUL	Stanislav Malamov (from Chernomorets Burgas)
23	DF	BUL	Ivan Dishkov (loan return from Lovech)
24	MF	BUL	Bogomil Bozhurkin (from Pirin Blagoevgrad)
27	DF	BUL	Dimitar Kalchev (from Spartak Pleven)
55	DF	BUL	Stanislav Rabotov (from Krumovgrad)
55	MF	BUL	Martin Haydarov (from Yantra Gabrovo)
70	MF	BUL	Samuil Mechev (from CSKA 1948 U17)
84	FW	BUL	Stiliyan Tisovski (from Yantra Gabrovo)

Out:

No.	Pos.	Nation	Player
2	DF	CRO	Dominik Pavlek (to (Football Association of Bosnia and Herzegovina) Posušje)
7	MF	CRO	Branimir Cavar (to (Romanian Football Federation) Gloria Bistrița)
8	MF	BUL	Georgi Karakashev (released)
9	FW	BUL	Toma Ushagelov (released)
10	FW	TUN	Nabil Makni (to (Hellenic Football Federation) Volos)
10	MF	BUL	Dimitar Zakonov (to Marek)
11	MF	MNE	Dušan Vuković (released)
11	DF	BUL	Petko Ganev (to Sevlievo)
15	FW	UKR	Danylo Kondrakov (to (Russian Football Union) KDV Tomsk)
17	DF	BUL	Ilker Budinov (to Spartak Varna)
18	DF	BIH	Omar Pašagić (to (Romanian Football Federation) Metaloglobus)
20	DF	SRB	Miloš Petrović (to (Football Association of Serbia) Dinamo Jug)
21	MF	BUL	Bozhidar Penchev (to Botev Vratsa)
29	DF	CRO	Mario Zebić (to (Football Federation of Kosovo) Gjilani)
33	DF	BUL	Stefan Tsonkov (to (Football Association of Thailand) Muangthong United)
44	DF	BUL	Nikolay Nikolaev (to Lokomotiv Plovdiv)
55	DF	BUL	Stanislav Rabotov (released)
55	FW	ALG	Yanis Guermouche (to Slavia Sofia)
70	MF	GER	Kenan Dünnwald-Turan (to (Football Association of Thailand) Muangthong United)
97	GK	CPV	Márcio Rosa (to Montana)

=== Lokomotiv Gorna Oryahovitsa ===
In:

No.	Pos.	Nation	Player
4	DF	BUL	David Mihalev (from Levski Sofia II)
12	GK	BUL	Kristiyan Milushev (from Spartak Plovdiv)
14	MF	BUL	Mihail Petrov (on loan from Levski Sofia II)
15	MF	BUL	Plamen Arshev (from Cherno More II)
16	DF	BUL	Teodor Raykov (from CSKA 1948 II)
17	FW	NGA	Akintomide Ayeni (on loan from Vihren Sandanski)
18	MF	BRA	Pedro Maines (from (Brazilian Football Confederation) Ceilândia)
20	FW	SUR	Yahcuroo Roemer (from (Royal Belgian Football Association) Esperanza Pelt)
29	FW	FRA	Ebenezer Simons (from Rilski Sportist)

Out:

No.	Pos.	Nation	Player
11	MF	BUL	Galin Tashev (released)
13	MF	BUL	Tsvetoslav Petrov (released)
16	MF	BUL	Stefan Mitev (to Chernomorets Balchik)
18	MF	BUL	Kristiyan Dechev (to Pavlikeni)
23	FW	BUL	Daniel Cabanelas (to Nesebar)
33	GK	UKR	Hennadiy Hanyev (to Fratria)
77	DF	BUL	Georgi Valchev (to Hebar)

=== Ludogorets Razgrad II ===
In:

No.	Pos.	Nation	Player

Out:

No.	Pos.	Nation	Player
63	DF	BUL	Anastas Pemperski (to Etar)
68	GK	BUL	Umut Habil (to Lokomotiv Sofia)
74	FW	BUL	Hyusein Kelyovluev (to Dunav Ruse)

=== Marek ===
In:

No.	Pos.	Nation	Player
2	MF	BUL	Borislav Nikolov (from Strumska Slava)
5	DF	BUL	Mario Petkov (from CSKA 1948)
9	FW	BUL	Iliya Dimitrov (from (Football Association of Slovenia) Tabor Sežana)
10	MF	BUL	Dimitar Zakonov (from Hebar)
10	FW	GUI	Ibrahima Berete (from Montana)
13	FW	BUL	Steven Kirilov (from Montana)
16	MF	BUL	Simeon Mechev (from Rilski Sportist)
17	MF	BUL	Teodor Ivanov (from Lokomotiv Sofia, previously on loan)
19	FW	FRA	Wilfried Kouakou (from Montana)
77	FW	BUL	Simeon Veshev (from Dobrudzha)
88	MF	NGA	Emmanuel Ajoku (from (Nigeria Football Federation) Klassisch FA)
94	FW	BUL	Yuliyan Nenov (from Lokomotiv Sofia)
99	DF	BUL	Borislav Vakadinov (from Montana)

Out:

No.	Pos.	Nation	Player
6	DF	BUL	Ivan Arsov (to Vihren)
10	MF	BUL	Nikolay Ganchev (to Montana)
10	FW	GUI	Ibrahima Berete (released)
13	FW	BUL	Steven Kirilov (released)
14	MF	BUL	Aleksandar Bliznakov (to Pirin Blagoevgrad)
15	DF	BUL	Ivan Ribarski (to Germaneya Sapareva Banya)
16	MF	BUL	Martin Atanasov (to Lokomotiv Plovdiv)
17	MF	BUL	Teodor Ivanov (released])
19	FW	BUL	Aleksandar Veselinski (to Vihren Sandanski)
27	FW	BUL	Ivan Kolev (end of contract)
32	DF	BUL	Aleksandar Bashliev (to Vihren)
55	DF	BUL	Slavi Nakov (to Germaneya Sapareva Banya)
77	MF	BUL	Milen Ivanov (to Vitosha Bistritsa)
94	MF	BUL	Daniel Stoyanov (to Germaneya Sapareva Banya)

=== Minyor Pernik ===
In:

No.	Pos.	Nation	Player
2	DF	BUL	Svetoslav Todorov (from Botev Plovdiv II)
4	DF	BUL	Miki Orachev (from Lokomotiv Sofia)
9	FW	BUL	Preslav Yordanov (from Etar)
15	FW	UKR	Danylo Tarasenko (on loan from CSKA 1948 U17)
20	DF	BUL	Lyuboslav Marinov (from Spartak Varna)
21	MF	BUL	Viktor Vasilev (from CSKA Sofia II)
24	MF	BUL	Vasil Hristov (from CSKA 1948 II)
26	MF	UKR	Egor Romanyuk (on loan from CSKA 1948 U17)
91	GK	BUL	Aleksandar Mihaylov (from Kyustendil)
—	MF	BRA	Cassiano Bouzon (on loan from CSKA 1948)

Out:

No.	Pos.	Nation	Player
2	DF	BUL	Mario Dadakov (to Hebar)
4	DF	BUL	Georgi Madzharov (released)
8	MF	BUL	Kristiyan Slishkov (to Sportist Svoge)
10	FW	BUL	Kaloyan Yosifov (released)
15	MF	BUL	Vladimir Semerdzhiev (to Balkan Botevgrad)
20	MF	BUL	Tomas Dobrev (to Sportist Svoge)
25	MF	BUL	David Dzhorov (to Strumska Slava)

=== Pirin Blagoevgrad ===
In:

No.	Pos.	Nation	Player
6	MF	BUL	Nikola Bandev (loan return from Strumska Slava)
12	MF	BUL	Todor Durev (from Strumska Slava)
14	MF	BUL	Aleksandar Bliznakov (from Marek)
19	FW	BUL	Mariyan Vangelov (from Botev Plovdiv II)
23	MF	BUL	Lazar Stoychev (from Strumska Slava)
98	MF	BUL	Georgi Tartov (from Krumovgrad)

Out:

No.	Pos.	Nation	Player
6	MF	BUL	Bogomil Bozhurkin (to Hebar)
7	MF	BUL	Georgi Valchev (end of contract)
10	FW	FRA	Aymen Souda (to Botev Vratsa)
12	GK	BUL	Borislav Smilyanski (to Vihren Sandanski)
23	MF	BUL	Steven Slavkov (to Balkan Botevgrad)
30	MF	BUL	Lyubomir Todorov (to Strumska Slava)
71	DF	BUL	Hristo Petrov (to Belasitsa)
72	FW	BUL	Nicholas Penev (released)
96	MF	GRE	Ilias Iliadis (to Montana)
98	FW	BUL	Valentin Yoskov (to Fratria)
—	GK	BUL	Yordan Dimitrov (released, previously on loan to Strumska Slava)

=== Sevlievo ===
In:

No.	Pos.	Nation	Player
1	GK	BUL	Nikola Zlatinov (from National Sofia)
3	DF	BUL	Nasko Yankov (from Lovech)
4	DF	RSA	Marko Veselinovic (from (Romanian Football Federation) Unirea Ungheni)
5	DF	BUL	Petko Ganev (from Hebar)
6	DF	GRE	Christoforos Karagiannis (from (Hellenic Football Federation) Panachaiki)
7	MF	BUL	Zhoro Roshkov (from Bansko)
8	DF	BUL	Roman Rodopski (from Bansko)
9	FW	BUL	Emil Kolev (from Yantra Gabrovo)
10	MF	COL	Santiago Montoya (from (Hellenic Football Federation) Makedonikos)
11	FW	GRE	Minas Chalkiadakis (from (Hellenic Football Federation) Panachaiki)
12	GK	BUL	Dimitar Pantev (from Etar II)
16	MF	BUL	Steliyan Dobrev (on loan from Fratria)
17	DF	BUL	Nikola Borisov (from CSKA Sofia II)
18	DF	BUL	Petar Kepov (from Strumska Slava)
19	MF	BUL	Ivaylo Mihaylov (from Yantra Gabrovo)
23	MF	BUL	Martin Banev (on loan from Cherno More)
28	MF	BUL	Viktor Ergin (from CSKA 1948 II)
29	FW	BUL	Yusein Kasov (from Lovech)
33	DF	GRE	Nikolaos Masouras (from (Hellenic Football Federation) Panachaiki)
—	FW	GHA	Edwin Gyasi (from (Football Federation of Armenia) Gandzasar Kapan)

Out:

No.	Pos.	Nation	Player
3	DF	BUL	Petar Ivanov (released)
10	DF	BUL	Kristiyan Kanchev (to Etar II)
19	DF	BUL	Ivan-Ioannis Atanatos (released)
92	MF	BUL	Nikolay Georgiev (released)
93	FW	BUL	Dimitar Baydakov (to Etar II)
—	DF	BUL	Ilhan Halil (released)
—	DF	BUL	Denislav Nikolov (released)
—	MF	BUL	Vanyo Georgiev (released)
—	FW	BUL	Stilyan Spasov (released)

=== Spartak Pleven ===
In:

No.	Pos.	Nation	Player
2	DF	BUL	Denis Corso (free agent)
5	DF	MDA	Petar Gospodinov (from Septemvri Sofia II)
16	DF	BUL	Ivan Ivanov (from Lovech)
20	MF	BUL	Plamen Spasov (from Kyustendil)
22	MF	BUL	Aleksandar Kozhuharov (from CSKA Sofia II)
23	MF	BUL	Martin Trifonov (from Juventus Malchika)
30	GK	UKR	Ilarion Tuhay (from Lovech)

Out:

No.	Pos.	Nation	Player
1	GK	BUL	Stanislav Antonov (to Partizan Cherven Bryag)
3	DF	NGA	Solomon James (to Montana)
4	DF	NGA	Ifeanyi David (released)
5	DF	BUL	Ivo Varbanov (retired)
8	MF	BUL	Rusi Chernakov (to Rozova Dolina)
20	FW	FRA	Emmanuel Attah (released)
21	DF	BUL	Dimitar Kalchev (to Hebar)
86	GK	BUL	Georgi Kitanov (to Dunav Ruse)

=== Sportist Svoge ===
In:

No.	Pos.	Nation	Player
1	GK	BUL	Zharko Istatkov (on loan from Lokomotiv Sofia)
6	DF	BUL	Radoslav Terziev (from (Cyprus Football Association) Peyia 2014)
7	FW	BUL	Georgi Atanasov (from Lovech)
9	FW	BUL	Nikola Gelin (from Nesebar)
10	FW	BUL	Todor Todorov (from Spartak Plovdiv)
11	MF	BUL	Kristiyan Slishkov (from Minyor Pernik)
16	MF	BUL	Spas Georgiev (on loan from Botev Vratsa)
19	MF	BUL	Vladimir Gogov (from Belasitsa Petrich)
27	MF	BUL	Tomas Dobrev (from Minyor Pernik)
87	MF	BUL	Ivelin Georgiev (from Montana)
88	FW	BRA	Yuri Pinheiro (on loan from Vihren Sandanski)
—	DF	BUL	Yoan Pavlov (from (German Football Association) SV Elversberg)

Out:

No.	Pos.	Nation	Player
6	DF	BUL	Georgi Pashov (to Kostinbrod)
7	FW	BUL	Evgeni Iliev (end of contract)
9	FW	BUL	Martin Toshev (to Rilski Sportist)
11	MF	BUL	Dimitar Zakonov (to Hebar)
14	MF	BUL	Emil Yanchev (to Spartak Varna)
18	FW	VEN	Alejandro Gonçalves (end of contract)
33	GK	BUL	Damyan Damyanov (to (Football Association of Malaysia) Kelantan The Real Warriors)
88	DF	CGO	Lionel Samba (end of contract)
99	FW	RSA	Jaisen Clifford (loan return to Etar)

=== Vihren ===
In:

No.	Pos.	Nation	Player
1	GK	BUL	Stanislav Nistorov (from Etar)
5	DF	BUL	Ivan Arsov (from Marek)
8	MF	ESP	Antonio Cotán (from (Royal Spanish Football Federation) Tudelano)
12	GK	BUL	Borislav Smilyanski (from Pirin Blagoevgrad)
15	MF	BUL	Kristiyan Velichkov (from CSKA 1948 II)
15	FW	BRA	Yuri Pinheiro (from (Brazilian Football Confederation) Capivariano)
16	FW	ALG	Wassim Aouachria (from (Football Association of Ireland) Glentoran)
17	MF	BRA	Leowanderson Ferreira (from (Brazilian Football Confederation) Floresta)
18	DF	BUL	Adrian Vidinov (from Slavia Sofia II)
20	FW	BUL	Aleksandar Veselinski (from Marek)
21	DF	BUL	Aleksandar Bashliev (from Marek)
24	MF	BUL	Ivaylo Klimentov (from Dobrudzha)
25	DF	BUL	Atanas Kilov (from CSKA 1948 II)

Out:

No.	Pos.	Nation	Player
1	GK	BUL	Vladislav Nikolov (to Septemvri Simitli)
5	DF	UKR	Dmytro Sydorenko (released)
6	DF	BUL	Vergil Yanev (released)
7	MF	BUL	Ruslan Ivanov (to Bansko)
12	GK	BUL	Kostadin Kotev (to Yantra Gabrovo)
13	MF	BUL	Veselin Lyubomirov (released)
14	DF	BUL	Rumen Sandev (retired)
15	FW	BRA	Yuri Pinheiro (on loan to Sportist Svoge)
16	MF	BUL	Aleksandar Videnov (to Pirin Gotse Delchev)
18	FW	NGA	Akintomide Ayeni (on loan to Lokomotiv Gorna Oryahovitsa)
19	MF	BUL	Aleksandar Yakimov (released)
26	DF	BUL	Georgi Ivanov (released)

=== Yantra ===
In:

No.	Pos.	Nation	Player
3	DF	BUL	Velizar Kanalyan (on loan from CSKA 1948 U17)
5	DF	BUL	Asen Georgiev (from CSKA 1948)
7	FW	BUL	Ivan Vasilev (from Krumovgrad)
12	GK	BUL	Kostadin Kotev (from Vihren Sandanski)
18	MF	BUL	Martin Haydarov (from Lokomotiv Plovdiv)
19	FW	BUL	Georgi Dimitrov (from Lovech)
22	DF	BUL	Velislav Boev (from Dobrudzha)
24	DF	BUL	Tihomir Dimitrov (from Lovech)

Out:

No.	Pos.	Nation	Player
5	DF	BUL	Tsvetelin Radev (released)
7	FW	BUL	Emil Kolev (to Sevlievo)
10	MF	BUL	Ayvan Angelov (to Fratria)
12	GK	BUL	Boris Gruev (to Hebar)
17	FW	BUL	Stiliyan Tisovski (to Hebar)
18	MF	BUL	Martin Haydarov (to Hebar)
19	MF	BUL	Ivaylo Mihaylov (to Sevlievo)
21	DF	BUL	Bozhidar Tomovski (to Septemvri Sofia)
23	DF	BUL	Hristo Mitev (to Lokomotiv Sofia)
24	MF	BUL	Daniel Gadzhev (retired)
