= 2023–24 First Professional Football League (Bulgaria) =

100th season of top-tier football league in Bulgaria

First Professional Football League
- Season: 2023–24
- Dates: 14 July 2023 – 31 May 2024
- Champions: Ludogorets Razgrad (13th title)
- Relegated: Etar; Pirin Blagoevgrad
- Champions League: Ludogorets Razgrad
- Europa League: Botev Plovdiv
- Conference League: Cherno More; CSKA 1948
- Matches: 283
- Goals: 678 (2.4 per match)
- Top goalscorer: Aleksandar Kolev (15 goals)
- Best goalkeeper: Plamen Andreev (17 clean sheets)
- Biggest home win: Levski Sofia 6–0 Lokomotiv Sofia (30 July 2023); Botev Plovdiv 6–0 Lokomotiv Sofia (26 October 2023); Ludogorets 6–0 Lokomotiv Sofia (16 March 2024)
- Biggest away win: Botev Vratsa 0–5 Ludogorets (5 August 2023)
- Highest scoring: Botev Vratsa 3–5 Botev Plovdiv (21 October 2023)
- Longest winning run: 14 games Ludogorets Razgrad
- Longest unbeaten run: 15 games CSKA Sofia
- Longest winless run: 12 games Etar
- Longest losing run: 7 games Slavia Sofia
- All statistics correct as of 19:57, 31 May 2024 (UTC).

The 2023–24 First Professional Football League, also known as efbet League for sponsorship reasons, is the 100th season of the top division of the Bulgarian football league system, the 76th since a league format was adopted for the national competition of A Group as a top tier of the pyramid, and also the 8th season of the First Professional Football League, which decides the Bulgarian champion. The season began on 14 July 2023.

Ludogorets Razgrad were the 12-time defending champions and successfully managed to defend the title, winning it for the thirteenth consecutive time.

== Teams ==
As in the last season, 16 teams will compete in the league this year. Two teams were promoted from the 2022–23 Second League, and another place is for the winner of the promotion/relegation playoff.

The first team to earn promotion from the Second League was Etar, who mathematically secured a top three finish after Sportist Svoge lost to Yantra on May 25. Etar return to the top level after a 2-year absence.

The second team to earn promotion from the Second League was Krumovgrad, who mathematically secured a top three finish after winning against Botev Plovdiv II on May 27. This is going to be Krumovgrad's maiden participation in the Bulgarian top flight.

Additionally, Beroe managed to defeat Sportist Svoge with a score of 1–0 in the promotion/relegation playoff, thus maintaining its place in the First League.

=== Stadia and locations ===
| Arda | Beroe | Botev Plovdiv | Botev Vratsa |
|---|---|---|---|
| Arena Arda | Beroe | Hristo Botev | Hristo Botev |
| Capacity: 11,114 | Capacity: 12,128 | Capacity: 18,777 | Capacity: 6,417 |
| Cherno More | CSKA 1948 | CSKA Sofia | Etar |
| Ticha | Bistritsa | Vasil Levski National Stadium | Ivaylo |
| Capacity: 6,250 | Capacity: 2,500 | Capacity: 43,000 | Capacity: 18,000 |
| Hebar | Location of teams in 2023–24 First League Sofia 2023–24 First League football clubs | | Krumovgrad |
| Georgi Benkovski | Location of teams in 2023–24 First League Sofia 2023–24 First League football clubs | | Krumovgrad |
| Capacity: 13,128 | Location of teams in 2023–24 First League Sofia 2023–24 First League football clubs | | Capacity: 1,500 |
| Levski Sofia | Location of teams in 2023–24 First League Sofia 2023–24 First League football clubs | | Lokomotiv Plovdiv |
| Vivacom Arena - Georgi Asparuhov | Location of teams in 2023–24 First League Sofia 2023–24 First League football clubs | | Lokomotiv |
| Capacity: 25,000 | Location of teams in 2023–24 First League Sofia 2023–24 First League football clubs | | Capacity: 8,610 |
| Lokomotiv Sofia | Ludogorets Razgrad | Pirin Blagoevgrad | Slavia Sofia |
| Lokomotiv | Huvepharma Arena | Hristo Botev | Aleksandar Shalamanov |
| Capacity: 22,000 | Capacity: 10,422 | Capacity: 7,500 | Capacity: 25,556 |

=== Personnel and kits ===
Note: Flags indicate national team as has been defined under FIFA eligibility rules. Players and managers may hold more than one non-FIFA nationality.

| Team | Manager | Captain | Kit manufacturer | Shirt sponsor | Additional |
|---|---|---|---|---|---|
| Arda | (Bulgaria) Nikolay Kirov | (Bulgaria) Ivan Kokonov | Uhlsport | efbet | IK Nataliya Ltd. |
| Beroe | (Argentina) José Acciari | (Bulgaria) Bozhidar Penchev | Dryworld | efbet | — |
| Botev Plovdiv | (Bosnia and Herzegovina) Dušan Kerkez | (Bulgaria) Lachezar Baltanov | Macron | WinBet | — |
| Botev Vratsa | (Bulgaria) Hristo Yanev | (Bulgaria) Krasimir Kostov | Nike | WinBet | Vratsa Municipality, SportRespect, Inex, Predsednik Ltd. |
| Cherno More | (Bulgaria) Ilian Iliev | (Bulgaria) Daniel Dimov | Uhlsport | Armeets | Planex Ltd. |
| CSKA 1948 | (Bulgaria) Valentin Iliev | (Bulgaria) Daniel Naumov | Puma | efbet | Bachkovo |
| CSKA Sofia | (Bulgaria) Stamen Belchev | (Netherlands) Jurgen Mattheij | Macron | WinBet | Haval |
| Etar | (Bulgaria) Svetoslav Petrov | (Bulgaria) Krum Stoyanov | Nike | WinBet | — |
| Hebar | (Bulgaria) Lyuboslav Penev | (Bulgaria) Petar Debarliev | Jako | efbet | Pazardzhik Municipality |
| Krumovgrad | (Bulgaria) Atanas Ribarski | (Bulgaria) Bozhidar Katsarov | Uhlsport | Compass Cargo Airlines | PIMK |
| Levski Sofia | (Bulgaria) Stanislav Genchev | (Bulgaria) Nikolay Mihaylov | Adidas | PalmsBet | — |
| Lokomotiv Plovdiv | Vacant | (Bulgaria) Dimitar Iliev | Joma | WinBet | Money+, Fuel Card Distribution |
| Lokomotiv Sofia | (Bulgaria) Krasimir Balakov | (Bulgaria) Krasimir Miloshev | Joma | Betano | Casa Boyana, Malizia, Intesa, VIA 2000, Club 33 |
| Ludogorets Razgrad | (Bulgaria) Georgi Dermendzhiev | (Bulgaria) Anton Nedyalkov | Nike | efbet | Vivacom, Huvepharma |
| Pirin Blagoevgrad | (Ukraine) Oleksandr Babych | (Bulgaria) Aleksandar Dyulgerov | Uhlsport | 8888.bg | — |
| Slavia Sofia | (Bulgaria) Zlatomir Zagorčić | (Bulgaria) Georgi Petkov | Zeus | bet365 | Asset Insurance, SportRespect |

Note: Individual clubs may wear jerseys with advertising. However, only one sponsorship is permitted per jersey for official tournaments organised by UEFA in addition to that of the kit manufacturer (exceptions are made for non-profit organisations). Clubs in the domestic league can have more than one sponsorship per jersey which can feature on the front of the shirt, incorporated with the main sponsor or in place of it; or on the back, either below the squad number or on the collar area. Shorts also have space available for advertisement.

=== Managerial changes ===
| Team | Outgoing manager | Manner of departure | Date of vacancy | Position in table | Incoming manager | Date of appointment |
|---|---|---|---|---|---|---|
| Levski Sofia | (Bulgaria) Elin Topuzakov | End of interim period | 12 June 2023 | Pre-season | (Bulgaria) Nikolay Kostov | 13 June 2023 |
| Beroe | (Bulgaria) Veselin Penev | End of interim period | 14 June 2023 | Pre-season | (Argentina) Gustavo Aragolaza | 15 June 2023 |
| Pirin Blagoevgrad | (Bulgaria) Hristo Yanev | End of contract | 17 June 2023 | Pre-season | (Bulgaria) Radoslav Mitrevski | 17 June 2023 |
| Slavia Sofia | (Bulgaria) Angel Slavkov | End of interim period | 22 June 2023 | Pre-season | (Spain) José Mari Bakero | 23 June 2023 |
| CSKA Sofia | (Serbia) Saša Ilić | Sacked | 29 July 2023 | 5th | (England) Nestor El Maestro | 29 July 2023 |
| CSKA 1948 | (Bulgaria) Atanas Ribarski | Resigned | 15 August 2023 | 7th | (Bulgaria) Nikolay Panayotov | 15 August 2023 |
| Botev Plovdiv | (Bulgaria) Stanislav Genchev | Mutual agreement | 22 August 2023 | 14th | (Portugal) Rafael Ferreira (interim) | 22 August 2023 |
| Pirin Blagoevgrad | (Bulgaria) Radoslav Mitrevski | Sacked | 27 August 2023 | 15th | (Bulgaria) Ivo Trenchev | 31 August 2023 |
| Botev Plovdiv | (Portugal) Rafael Ferreira | End of interim period | 4 September 2023 | 11th | (Bosnia and Herzegovina) Dušan Kerkez | 4 September 2023 |
| Lokomotiv Sofia | (Bulgaria) Stoycho Stoev | Resigned | 4 September 2023 | 12th | (Serbia) Danilo Dončić | 4 September 2023 |
| Botev Vratsa | (Brazil) Daniel Morales | Resigned | 18 September 2023 | 13th | (Bulgaria) Hristo Yanev | 19 September 2023 |
| Beroe | (Argentina) Gustavo Aragolaza | Sacked | 18 September 2023 | 6th | (Argentina) José Acciari | 20 September 2023 |
| Slavia Sofia | (Spain) José Mari Bakero | Sacked | 19 September 2023 | 14th | (Bulgaria) Ivan Kolev | 20 September 2023 |
| Etar | (Bulgaria) Emanuel Lukanov | Sacked | 30 September 2023 | 16th | (Bulgaria) Marin Stefanov (interim) | 30 September 2023 |
| Etar | (Bulgaria) Marin Stefanov | End of interim period | 2 October 2023 | 16th | (Bulgaria) Svetoslav Petrov | 2 October 2023 |
| Slavia Sofia | (Bulgaria) Ivan Kolev | Mutual agreement | 23 October 2023 | 15th | (Bulgaria) Zlatomir Zagorčić | 23 October 2023 |
| Ludogorets Razgrad | (Bulgaria) Ivaylo Petev | Sacked | 23 October 2023 | 5th | (Bulgaria) Georgi Dermendzhiev | 24 October 2023 |
| Krumovgrad | (Sweden) Nemanja Miljanović | Sacked | 28 October 2023 | 10th | (Bulgaria) Stanislav Genchev | 24 October 2023 |
| Pirin Blagoevgrad | (Bulgaria) Ivo Trenchev | Sacked | 4 February 2024 | 14th | (Ukraine) Oleksandr Babych | 5 February 2024 |
| Arda | (Bulgaria) Aleksandar Tunchev | Mutual agreement | 25 February 2024 | 8th | (Bulgaria) Nikolay Kirov | 26 February 2024 |
| CSKA 1948 | (Bulgaria) Nikolay Panayotov | Sacked | 5 April 2024 | 7th | (Bulgaria) Valentin Iliev | 5 April 2024 |
| CSKA Sofia | (England) Nestor El Maestro | Sacked | 14 April 2024 | 3rd | (Bulgaria) Stamen Belchev | 14 April 2024 |
| Lokomotiv Sofia | (Serbia) Danilo Dončić | Sacked | 22 April 2024 | 14th | (Bulgaria) Krasimir Balakov | 22 April 2024 |
| Lokomotiv Plovdiv | (Bulgaria) Aleksandar Tomash | Mutual agreement | 27 May 2024 | 5th | | |
| Krumovgrad | (Bulgaria) Stanislav Genchev | Mutual agreement | 28 May 2024 | 6th | (Bulgaria) Atanas Ribarski | 28 May 2024 |
| Levski Sofia | (Bulgaria) Nikolay Kostov | End of contract | 28 May 2024 | 4th | (Bulgaria) Stanislav Genchev | 28 May 2024 |
| Arda | (Bulgaria) Nikolay Kirov | Mutual agreement | 31 May 2024 | 8th | | |
| CSKA Sofia | (Bulgaria) Stamen Belchev | Resigned | 31 May 2024 | 3rd | | |

== Regular season ==
=== League table ===
| Pos | Team | Pld | W | D | L | GF | GA | GD | Pts | Qualification |
|---|---|---|---|---|---|---|---|---|---|---|
| 1 | Ludogorets Razgrad | 30 | 24 | 3 | 3 | 78 | 15 | +63 | 75 | Qualification for the Championship group |
| 2 | CSKA Sofia | 30 | 19 | 6 | 5 | 50 | 19 | +31 | 63 | Qualification for the Championship group |
| 3 | Cherno More | 30 | 18 | 8 | 4 | 47 | 25 | +22 | 62 | Qualification for the Championship group |
| 4 | Lokomotiv Plovdiv | 30 | 16 | 7 | 7 | 50 | 34 | +16 | 55 | Qualification for the Championship group |
| 5 | Levski Sofia | 30 | 16 | 6 | 8 | 45 | 26 | +19 | 54 | Qualification for the Championship group |
| 6 | Krumovgrad | 30 | 12 | 8 | 10 | 35 | 35 | 0 | 44 (Note: Head-to-head points: Krumovgrad 6, Botev Plovdiv 0.) | Qualification for the Championship group |
| 7 | Botev Plovdiv | 30 | 12 | 8 | 10 | 47 | 33 | +14 | 44 | Qualification for the Conference League group |
| 8 | CSKA 1948 | 30 | 11 | 10 | 9 | 30 | 26 | +4 | 43 | Qualification for the Conference League group |
| 9 | Arda | 30 | 11 | 6 | 13 | 32 | 32 | 0 | 39 | Qualification for the Conference League group |
| 10 | Slavia Sofia | 30 | 9 | 6 | 15 | 28 | 45 | −17 | 33 (Note: Head-to-head points: Slavia Sofia 3, Beroe 3. Head-to-head goal difference: Slavia Sofia 0, Beroe 0. Overall goal difference: Slavia Sofia -17, Beroe -18.) | Qualification for the Conference League group |
| 11 | Beroe | 30 | 9 | 6 | 15 | 24 | 42 | −18 | 33 | Qualification for the Relegation group |
| 12 | Pirin Blagoevgrad | 30 | 7 | 9 | 14 | 23 | 41 | −18 | 30 (Note: Head-to-head points: Pirin Blagoevgrad 4, Hebar 1.) | Qualification for the Relegation group |
| 13 | Hebar | 30 | 8 | 6 | 16 | 32 | 44 | −12 | 30 | Qualification for the Relegation group |
| 14 | Lokomotiv Sofia | 30 | 8 | 4 | 18 | 22 | 56 | −34 | 28 | Qualification for the Relegation group |
| 15 | Botev Vratsa | 30 | 6 | 4 | 20 | 22 | 53 | −31 | 22 | Qualification for the Relegation group |
| 16 | Etar | 30 | 3 | 5 | 22 | 17 | 56 | −39 | 14 | Qualification for the Relegation group |

Source: soccerway, Bulgarian Football
Rules for classification: 1) Points; 2) Head-to-head points; 3) Head-to-head goal difference; 4) Head-to-head goals scored; 5) Head-to-head away goals scored (only if two teams); 6) Goal difference; 7) Goals scored; 8) Fairplay ranking; 9) Draw

=== Results ===
| Home \ Away | ARD | BER | BPD | BVR | CHM | CSK | CSS | ETA | HEB | KRU | LEV | LPD | LSO | LUD | PIR | SLA |
|---|---|---|---|---|---|---|---|---|---|---|---|---|---|---|---|---|
| Arda | — | 1–0 | 0–2 | 4–0 | 3–3 | 0–3 | 2–3 | 3–0 | 3–1 | 1–1 | 0–0 | 1–2 | 1–0 | 0–0 | 0–0 | 2–1 |
| Beroe | 1–0 | — | 0–3 | 2–2 | 2–0 | 0–0 | 0–3 | 0–0 | 2–1 | 2–0 | 2–1 | 2–2 | 0–1 | 0–2 | 0–0 | 3–0 |
| Botev Plovdiv | 0–2 | 4–1 | — | 2–0 | 0–0 | 0–0 | 1–2 | 2–0 | 1–0 | 1–2 | 1–3 | 0–0 | 6–0 | 0–2 | 3–1 | 3–1 |
| Botev Vratsa | 1–2 | 1–0 | 3–5 | — | 0–1 | 1–2 | 0–2 | 2–0 | 3–2 | 0–0 | 0–1 | 2–0 | 0–2 | 0–5 | 1–2 | 2–0 |
| Cherno More | 1–0 | 2–0 | 1–0 | 2–1 | — | 2–1 | 1–0 | 2–1 | 1–0 | 3–2 | 3–1 | 2–2 | 3–0 | 1–0 | 2–1 | 3–0 |
| CSKA 1948 | 1–0 | 0–1 | 1–0 | 0–0 | 1–1 | — | 1–2 | 1–0 | 1–1 | 0–3 | 1–0 | 1–1 | 2–1 | 0–1 | 3–0 | 1–1 |
| CSKA Sofia | 0–0 | 3–0 | 4–0 | 3–0 | 1–1 | 2–0 | — | 2–0 | 3–0 | 1–0 | 1–1 | 1–2 | 2–0 | 0–1 | 1–2 | 1–1 |
| Etar | 2–1 | 2–2 | 1–2 | 2–1 | 1–2 | 1–1 | 0–1 | — | 2–5 | 0–0 | 0–3 | 0–1 | 1–2 | 0–4 | 0–2 | 0–1 |
| Hebar | 1–0 | 1–0 | 1–0 | 1–1 | 1–1 | 1–3 | 0–0 | 3–0 | — | 0–0 | 0–1 | 3–4 | 0–1 | 0–3 | 1–2 | 1–0 |
| Krumovgrad | 1–3 | 1–0 | 2–1 | 1–0 | 1–3 | 1–0 | 1–4 | 0–0 | 3–2 | — | 2–2 | 3–1 | 2–0 | 3–1 | 2–2 | 2–0 |
| Levski Sofia | 4–0 | 1–0 | 1–1 | 1–0 | 1–0 | 1–2 | 0–2 | 1–0 | 1–0 | 0–0 | — | 3–0 | 6–0 | 0–1 | 2–0 | 2–0 |
| Lokomotiv Plovdiv | 1–0 | 1–2 | 1–1 | 4–0 | 1–0 | 1–1 | 0–2 | 3–0 | 1–2 | 4–0 | 2–1 | — | 2–1 | 1–2 | 3–0 | 2–0 |
| Lokomotiv Sofia | 0–1 | 1–0 | 0–4 | 1–0 | 0–0 | 0–0 | 0–1 | 1–3 | 0–1 | 0–2 | 2–2 | 2–4 | — | 1–3 | 2–0 | 1–2 |
| Ludogorets Razgrad | 2–0 | 5–0 | 2–2 | 5–0 | 3–1 | 2–0 | 3–0 | 5–0 | 3–1 | 1–0 | 5–1 | 1–1 | 6–0 | — | 4–0 | 2–3 |
| Pirin Blagoevgrad | 0–2 | 1–2 | 0–0 | 0–1 | 0–0 | 2–1 | 1–2 | 2–1 | 1–1 | 1–0 | 1–2 | 0–1 | 1–1 | 0–2 | — | 1–1 |
| Slavia Sofia | 1–0 | 3–0 | 2–2 | 1–0 | 1–5 | 0–2 | 1–1 | 1–0 | 3–1 | 2–0 | 0–2 | 1–2 | 1–2 | 0–2 | 0–0 | — |

Source: Bulgarian Football
Legend: Blue = home team win; Yellow = draw; Red = away team win.
For upcoming matches, an "a" indicates there is an article about the rivalry between the two participants.

== Championship round ==
Points and goals will carry over in full from regular season.

| Pos | Team | Pld | W | D | L | GF | GA | GD | Pts | Qualification | LUD | CHM | CSS | LEV | LPD | KRU |
|---|---|---|---|---|---|---|---|---|---|---|---|---|---|---|---|---|
| 1 | Ludogorets Razgrad (C) | 35 | 26 | 4 | 5 | 87 | 24 | +63 | 82 | Qualification for the Champions League first qualifying round | — | — | 3–1 | — | 3–0 | 3–3 |
| 2 | Cherno More | 35 | 22 | 9 | 4 | 56 | 26 | +30 | 75 | Qualification for the Conference League second qualifying round | 4–0 | — | — | — | 1–0 | 3–1 |
| 3 | CSKA Sofia | 35 | 20 | 7 | 8 | 56 | 27 | +29 | 67 | Qualification for the Conference League play-off | — | 0–1 | — | 3–1 | — | 2–2 |
| 4 | Levski Sofia | 35 | 19 | 7 | 9 | 50 | 30 | +20 | 64 | | 1–0 | 0–0 | — | — | — | — |
| 5 | Lokomotiv Plovdiv | 35 | 17 | 7 | 11 | 53 | 44 | +9 | 58 | | — | — | 1–0 | 1–2 | — | — |
| 6 | Krumovgrad | 35 | 13 | 10 | 12 | 45 | 45 | 0 | 49 | | — | — | — | 0–1 | 4–1 | — |

Source: Soccerway, Bulgarian Football
Legend: Blue = home team win; Yellow = draw; Red = away team win.
Rules for classification: 1) Points; 2) Head-to-head points; 3) Head-to-head goal difference; 4) Head-to-head goals scored; 5) Head-to-head away goals scored (only if two teams); 6) Goal difference; 7) Goals scored; 8) Fairplay ranking; 9) Draw.
(C) Champions

== Conference League round ==
Points and goals will carry over in full from regular season.

| Pos | Team | Pld | W | D | L | GF | GA | GD | Pts | Qualification | CSK | ARD | BPD | SLA |
|---|---|---|---|---|---|---|---|---|---|---|---|---|---|---|
| 1 | CSKA 1948 (O) | 36 | 13 | 13 | 10 | 35 | 30 | +5 | 52 | Qualification for the Conference League play-off | — | 1–1 | 2–1 | 0–2 |
| 2 | Arda | 36 | 14 | 9 | 13 | 39 | 35 | +4 | 51 | | 0–0 | — | 2–1 | 3–1 |
| 3 | Botev Plovdiv | 36 | 12 | 9 | 15 | 50 | 42 | +8 | 45 | Qualification for the Europa League first qualifying round (Note: Botev Plovdiv qualified for the Europa League first qualifying round as 2023–24 Bulgarian Cup winners.) | 0–0 | 0–1 | — | 0–1 |
| 4 | Slavia Sofia | 36 | 12 | 7 | 17 | 35 | 51 | −16 | 43 | | 0–2 | 0–0 | 3–1 | — |

Source: Soccerway, Bulgarian Football
Legend: Blue = home team win; Yellow = draw; Red = away team win.
Rules for classification: 1) Points; 2) Head-to-head points; 3) Head-to-head goal difference; 4) Head-to-head goals scored; 5) Head-to-head away goals scored (only if two teams); 6) Goal difference; 7) Goals scored; 8) Fairplay ranking; 9) Draw.
(O) Play-off winners

== Relegation round ==
Points and goals will carry over in full from regular season.

| Pos | Team | Pld | W | D | L | GF | GA | GD | Pts | Qualification or relegation | BER | LSO | HEB | BVR | PIR | ETA |
|---|---|---|---|---|---|---|---|---|---|---|---|---|---|---|---|---|
| 1 | Beroe | 35 | 12 | 6 | 17 | 30 | 46 | −16 | 42 | | — | 0–3 | — | — | 2–0 | 3–0 |
| 2 | Lokomotiv Sofia | 35 | 11 | 6 | 18 | 30 | 58 | −28 | 39 | | — | — | — | 1–1 | 1–0 | — |
| 3 | Hebar | 35 | 9 | 7 | 19 | 35 | 49 | −14 | 34 | | 0–1 | 0–2 | — | — | — | 3–1 |
| 4 | Botev Vratsa (O) | 35 | 9 | 6 | 20 | 28 | 56 | −28 | 33 | Qualification for the relegation play-off | 1–0 | — | 1–0 | — | — | — |
| 5 | Pirin Blagoevgrad (R) | 35 | 7 | 11 | 17 | 26 | 48 | −22 | 32 | Relegation to the Second League | — | — | 0–0 | 1–2 | — | 2–2 |
| 6 | Etar (R) | 35 | 3 | 8 | 24 | 22 | 66 | −44 | 17 | Relegation to the Second League | — | 1–1 | — | 1–1 | — | — |

Source: Soccerway, Bulgarian Football
Legend: Blue = home team win; Yellow = draw; Red = away team win.
Rules for classification: 1) Points; 2) Head-to-head points; 3) Head-to-head goal difference; 4) Head-to-head goals scored; 5) Head-to-head away goals scored (only if two teams); 6) Goal difference; 7) Goals scored; 8) Fairplay ranking; 9) Draw.
(O) Play-off winners; (R) Relegated

== Conference League play-off ==
31 May 2024
20:00 EEST

| CSKA Sofia | 0–2 | CSKA 1948 |
|---|---|---|
| | Report | Piščević 30'; Pedrinho 53' |

Vasil Levski National Stadium, Sofia
Attendance: 5,800
Referee: Dragomir Draganov (Varna)

== Promotion/relegation play-off ==
30 May 2024
19:00 EEST

| Botev Vratsa | 1–1 (a.e.t.) | Marek |
|---|---|---|
| Smolenski 50' | Report | Bliznakov 83' |
Penalties
| Perea (penalty scored); N'Diaye (penalty scored); Genov (penalty scored); Velev (penalty missed); Smolenski (penalty scored) | 4–2 | (penalty missed) Bliznakov; (penalty scored) Ganchev; (penalty missed) Stoynev; (penalty scored) Kaymakanski |

Stadion Hristo Botev, Vratsa
Attendance: 5,000
Referee: Georgi Kabakov (Plovdiv)

== Season statistics ==
=== Top scorers ===
As of 26 May 2024

| Rank | Player | Club | Goals |
|---|---|---|---|
| 1 | (Bulgaria) Aleksandar Kolev | Krumovgrad | 15 |
| 2 | (Brazil) Rwan Cruz | Ludogorets | 14 |
| 3 | (Switzerland) Kwadwo Duah | Ludogorets | 13 |
| 4 | (Bulgaria) Atanas Iliev | Cherno More | 12 |
| 4 | (Bulgaria) Georgi Nikolov | Hebar / Botev Plovdiv | 12 |
| 6 | (Poland) Jakub Piotrowski | Ludogorets | 11 |
| 7 | (Bulgaria) Toni Tasev | Slavia Sofia | 10 |
| 7 | (Ghana) Bernard Tekpetey | Ludogorets | 10 |
| 9 | (Norway) Jonathan Lindseth | CSKA Sofia | 9 |
| 9 | (Brazil) Ricardinho | Levski Sofia | 9 |
| 11 | (France) Antoine Baroan | Botev Plovdiv | 8 |
| 11 | (Spain) Jawad El Jemili | Levski Sofia | 8 |
| 11 | (Brazil) Pedrinho | CSKA 1948 | 8 |
| 11 | (Cameroon) Vinni Triboulet | Beroe | 8 |

=== Clean sheets ===
As of 26 May 2024

| Rank | Goalkeeper | Club | Clean sheets |
|---|---|---|---|
| 1 | (Bulgaria) Plamen Andreev | Levski Sofia | 17 |
| 2 | (Bulgaria) Ivan Dyulgerov | Cherno More | 16 |
| 3 | (Brazil) Gustavo Busatto | CSKA Sofia | 15 |
| 4 | (Bulgaria) Anatoli Gospodinov | Arda | 13 |
| 5 | (Netherlands) Sergio Padt | Ludogorets | 12 |
| 6 | (Bulgaria) Yanko Georgiev | Krumovgrad | 10 |
| 6 | (Bosnia and Herzegovina) Hidajet Hankić | Botev Plovdiv | 10 |
| 6 | (Bulgaria) Aleksandar Lyubenov | Lokomotiv Sofia | 10 |
| 9 | (Argentina) Rodrìgo Accinelli | Beroe | 8 |
| 9 | (Croatia) Dinko Horkaš | Lokomotiv Plovdiv | 8 |
| 9 | (Ukraine) Maksym Kovalyov | Pirin Blagoevgrad | 8 |
| 9 | (Croatia) Simon Sluga | Ludogorets | 8 |

=== Hat-tricks ===
As of 28 April 2024

| Player | For | Against | Result | Date |
|---|---|---|---|---|
| (Bulgaria) Georgi Nikolov | Hebar | Lokomotiv Plovdiv | 3–4 (H) | 25 August 2023 |
| (France) Antoine Baroan | Botev Plovdiv | Beroe | 4–1 (H) | 30 September 2023 |
| (Bulgaria) Atanas Iliev | Cherno More | Lokomotiv Sofia | 3–0 (H) | 4 April 2024 |

== Attendances ==
| # | Club | Average |
|---|---|---|
| 1 | Levski | 8,571 |
| 2 | CSKA Sofia | 6,206 |
| 3 | PFC Botev | 4,837 |
| 4 | Lokomotiv Plovdiv | 3,451 |
| 5 | Cherno More | 2,519 |
| 6 | Etar | 2,187 |
| 7 | Hebar | 2,138 |
| 8 | Ludogorets | 1,847 |
| 9 | Pirin | 1,414 |
| 10 | Arda | 1,183 |
| 11 | Beroe | 1,093 |
| 12 | Botev Vratsa | 831 |
| 13 | Krumovgrad | 636 |
| 14 | Lokomotiv Sofia | 529 |
| 15 | Slavia Sofia | 402 |
| 16 | CSKA 1948 | 237 |
