= Georgi Sheytanov =

Bulgarian footballer

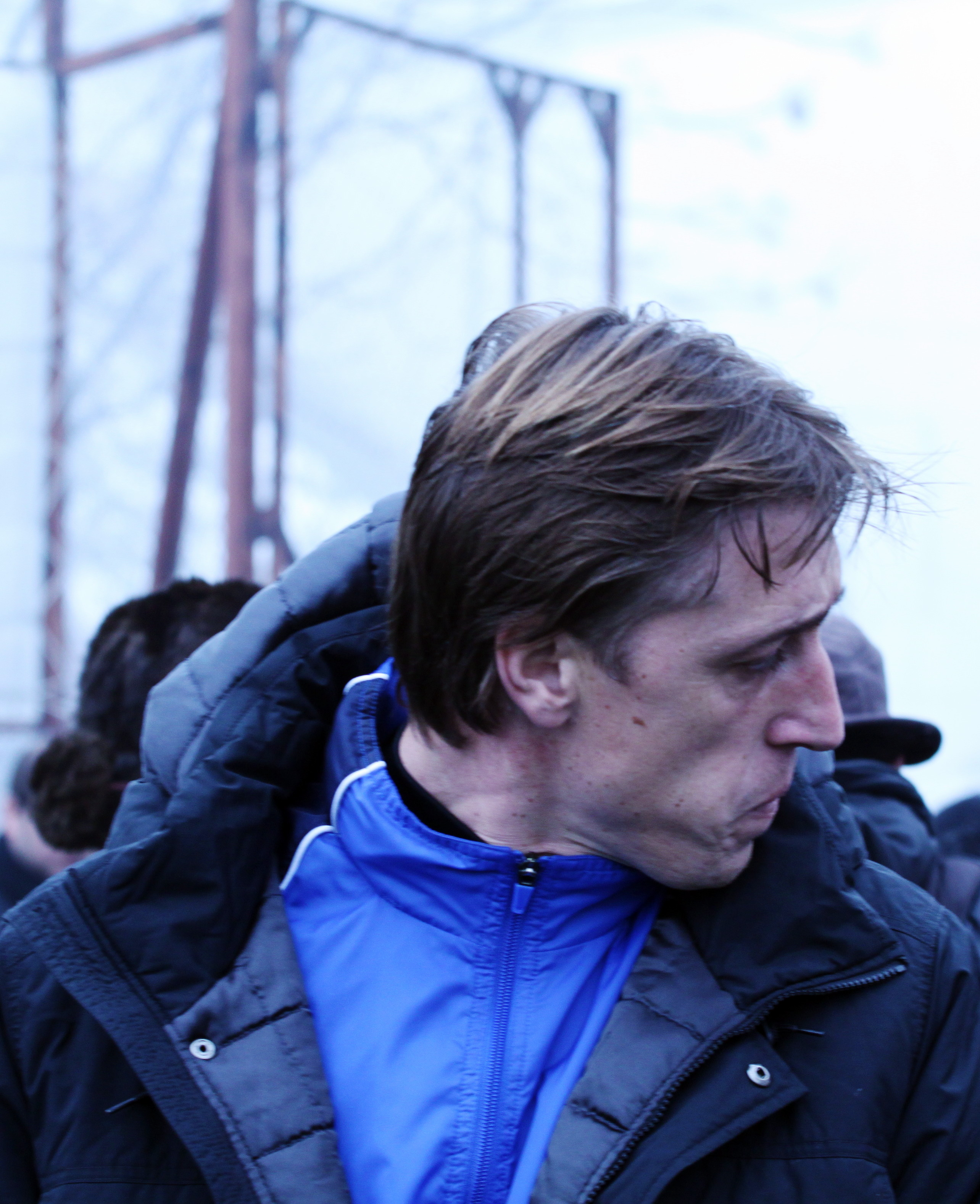

Personal information
- Full name: Georgi Nikolov Sheytanov
- Date of birth: 24 November 1972 (age 53)
- Place of birth: Sofia, Bulgaria
- Height: 1.92 m (6 ft 3 1/2 in)
- Position: Goalkeeper

Youth career
- Slavia Sofia

Senior career*
| Years | Team | Apps | (Gls) |
| 1991–1995 | Slavia Sofia | 29 | (0) |
| 1995–1996 | Montana | 11 | (0) |
| 1996 | Akademik Sofia | 8 | (0) |
| 1996–1997 | Spartak Pleven | 15 | (0) |
| 1997–2002 | Levski Sofia | 9 | (0) |
| 2002–2003 | PAS Giannina | 12 | (0) |
| 2003–2004 | Lokomotiv Sofia | 10 | (0) |
| 2004–2005 | Levadiakos | 2 | (0) |
| 2005–2008 | Vihren Sandanski | 56 | (0) |
| 2006 | → Zagorets (loan) | 9 | (0) |
| 2008–2009 | Minyor Pernik | 1 | (0) |
| Total | | 161 | (0) |

Managerial career
- 2013: Botev Vratsa (goalkeepers)
- 2014–2016: Shijiazhuang Yongchang (goalkeepers)
- 2017: Beijing Enterprises (goalkeepers)
- 2017: Henan Jianye (goalkeepers)
- 2018–2019: Shijiazhuang Yongchang (goalkeepers)
- 2021–2022: Bulgaria (goalkeepers)
- * Club domestic league appearances and goals

Georgi Sheytanov (Bulgarian: Георги Шейтанов; born 24 November 1972) is a former Bulgarian footballer who played as a goalkeeper.

== Personal life ==
Sheytanov is the father of the footballer Dimitar Sheytanov.
