= Hristiyan Slavkov =

Bulgarian footballer

Personal information
- Full name: Hristiyan Georgiev Slavkov
- Date of birth: 26 February 2003 (age 23)
- Place of birth: Plovdiv, Bulgaria
- Height: 1.90 m (6 ft 3 in)
- Position: Goalkeeper

Team information
- Current team: Botev Plovdiv
- Number: 84

Youth career
- 2011–2015: Maritsa Plovdiv
- 2015–2020: Botev Plovdiv

Senior career*
Years	Team	Apps	(Gls)
2020	Septemvri Sofia	0	(0)
2021–2022	Botev Plovdiv II	38	(0)
2021–2023	Botev Plovdiv	2	(0)
2023	→ Etar (loan)	15	(0)
2023–2025	Cherno More	1	(0)
2025–	Botev Plovdiv	1	(0)
- * Club domestic league appearances and goals as of 26 February 2026

Hristiyan Slavkov (Bulgarian: Християн Славков; born 26 February 2003) is a Bulgarian professional footballer who plays as a goalkeeper for Bulgarian First League club Botev Plovdiv.

== Career ==
Slavkov spent his early career playing for Maritsa Plovdiv before joining Botev Plovdiv at the age of 12. He made his debut in First league in 2020/2021 season against Tsarsko selo. Also with Botev Plovdiv he played in the match in which the team won the bronze medals in season 2021/2022

On 4 January 2023, Slavkov joined Second League club Etar Veliko Tarnovo on loan until the end of the season. He helped the team to won promotion in First league

On 27 June 2023, Slavkov signed a two-year deal with Cherno More Varna,. He won silver medal with the team in season 2023/2024 and made his competitive debut for the club on 31 October 2023 in a 1–0 away loss against Litex Lovech in the Bulgarian Cup.

On 12 July 2025, Slavkov returned to Botev Plovdiv.
