= Rosen Ivanov =

Bulgarian footballer

Personal information
- Full name: Rosen Ivanov Ivanov
- Date of birth: 25 April 2003 (age 23)
- Place of birth: Gabrovo, Bulgaria
- Height: 1.76 m (5 ft 9 in)
- Position: Forward

Team information
- Current team: Etar
- Number: 7

Youth career
- Yantra Gabrovo
- –2016: Litex Lovech
- 2016–2019: Ludogorets

Senior career*
| Years | Team | Apps | (Gls) |
| 2019–2022 | Ludogorets III | 28 | (8) |
| 2019–2025 | Ludogorets II | 89 | (5) |
| 2024–2025 | Ludogorets Razgrad | 1 | (0) |
| 2025– | Etar | 54 | (3) |
- * Club domestic league appearances and goals as of 31 October 2026

Rosen Ivanov (Bulgarian: Росен Иванов; born 25 April 2003) is a Bulgarian footballer who plays as a forward for Etar.

== Career ==
Ivanov completed his league debut for Ludogorets Razgrad on 29 May 2024 in a match against Levski Sofia. In February 2025 he was transferred to Etar.

== Personal life ==
Ivanov's older brother, Toni, is also a footballer, currently playing for Yantra Gabrovo.
