= Zdravko Iliev =

Bulgarian footballer

Personal information
- Full name: Zdravko Iliev Zapryanov
- Date of birth: 19 October 1984 (age 42)
- Place of birth: Stara Zagora, Bulgaria
- Height: 1.76 m (5 ft 9 in)
- Position: Right back

Senior career*
Years	Team	Apps	(Gls)
2004–2005	Beroe	0	(0)
2005–2008	Minyor Radnevo	39	(5)
2008–2013	Beroe	86	(0)
2014	CSKA Sofia	0	(0)
2014–2015	Lokomotiv Plovdiv	12	(0)
2015–2018	Vereya	90	(1)
2019–2023	Etar Veliko Tarnovo	94	(2)
- * Club domestic league appearances and goals as of 5 June 2023

Zdravko Iliev Zapryanov (Bulgarian: Здравко Илиев Запрянов; born 19 October 1984) is a Bulgarian football player who plays as a right back for Etar Veliko Tarnovo.

== Club career ==
On 22 December 2013, Iliev signed a one-and-a-half-year contract with CSKA Sofia. On 13 July 2014 he became a free agent and soon after that rejoined Loko Plovdiv.

In June 2018, Iliev signed with Pirin Blagoevgrad.

== Honours ==
Beroe

- Bulgarian Cup (2): 2009–10, 2012–13
- Bulgarian Supercup (1): 2013
