= Stadion Rakovski =

Multi-use stadium in Sevlievo, Bulgaria

Coordinates: 43°1′27″N 25°6′41″E

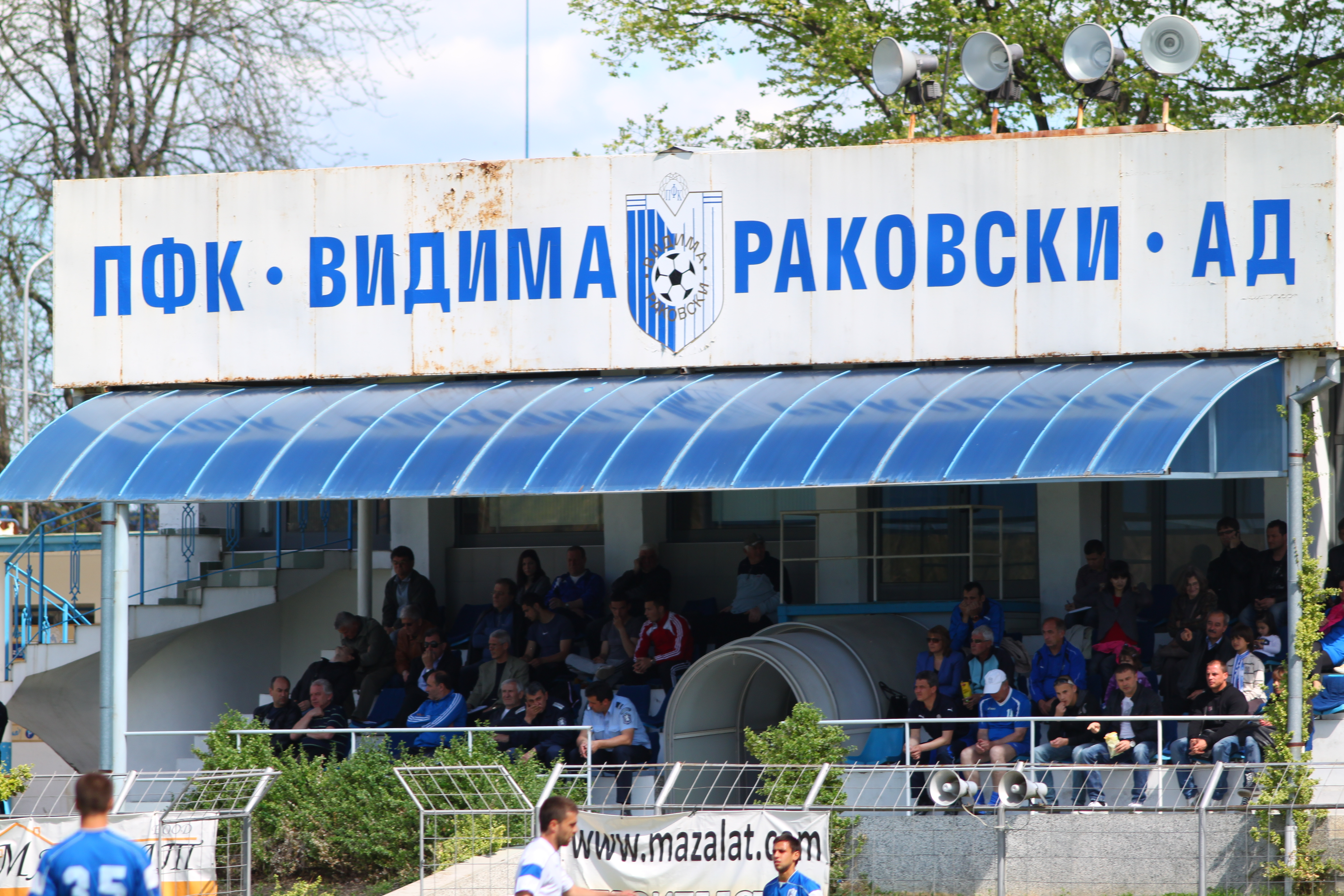
- Interactive map of Stadion Rakovski
- Location: Sevlievo, Bulgaria
- Owner: Sevlievo Municipality
- Operator: FC Sevlievo
- Capacity: 5,000
- Surface: Grass

Construction
- Groundbreaking: 1955
- Built: 1955 - 1958
- Opened: November 1, 1958
- Renovated: 2001

Tenant
- FC Sevlievo (1958-present)

Stadion Rakovski (Bulgarian: Стадион „Раковски“, English: 'Rakovski Stadium') is a multi-use stadium in Sevlievo, Bulgaria. It is used mostly for football matches and is the home ground of FC Sevlievo. The stadium holds a capacity for 8,816 people.
