= Dimitar Zakonov =

Bulgarian footballer

Personal information
- Full name: Dimitar Elen Zakonov
- Date of birth: 20 June 1999 (age 27)
- Place of birth: Asenovgrad, Bulgaria
- Height: 1.75 m (5 ft 9 in)
- Position: Winger

Team information
- Current team: Sportist Svoge

Youth career
- Slavia Sofia
- Lokomotiv Plovdiv

Senior career*
| Years | Team | Apps | (Gls) |
| 2017–2019 | Lokomotiv Plovdiv | 1 | (0) |
| 2018–2019 | → Arda (loan) | 21 | (3) |
| 2019 | Pomorie | 17 | (2) |
| 2020 | Hebar | 8 | (0) |
| 2021 | Montana | 7 | (0) |
| 2021 | Neftochimic Burgas | 13 | (1) |
| 2022–2023 | Sozopol | 11 | (1) |
| 2024–2025 | Dunav Ruse | 25 | (1) |
| 2025– | Sportist Svoge | 0 | (0) |
- * Club domestic league appearances and goals as of 24 January 2025

Dimitar Elen Zakonov (Bulgarian: Димитър Елен Законов; born 20 June 1999) is a Bulgarian footballer who plays as a midfielder for Sportist Svoge.

== Career ==
=== Lokomotiv Plovdiv ===
On 31 May 2017, Zakonov made his debut for Lokomotiv Plovdiv in a match against Ludogorets Razgrad.

== Career statistics ==
=== Club ===
As of 31 May 2019

| Club performance | | | League | | Cup | | Continental | | Other | | Total | |
| Club | League | Season | Apps | Goals | Apps | Goals | Apps | Goals | Apps | Goals | Apps | Goals |
| Bulgaria | | | League | | Bulgarian Cup | | Europe | | Other (Note: Includes Bulgarian Supercup matches.) | | Total | |
|---|---|---|---|---|---|---|---|---|---|---|---|---|
| Lokomotiv Plovdiv | First League | 2016–17 | 1 | 0 | 0 | 0 | — | | — | | 1 | 0 |
| Lokomotiv Plovdiv | First League | 2017–18 | 0 | 0 | 0 | 0 | — | | — | | 0 | 0 |
| Lokomotiv Plovdiv | Total | | 1 | 0 | 0 | 0 | 0 | 0 | 0 | 0 | 1 | 0 |
| Arda (loan) | Second League | 2018–19 | 21 | 3 | 1 | 0 | — | | — | | 22 | 3 |
| Career statistics | | | 22 | 3 | 1 | 0 | 0 | 0 | 0 | 0 | 23 | 3 |
