= Dimitar Sheytanov =

Bulgarian professional footballer (born 1999)

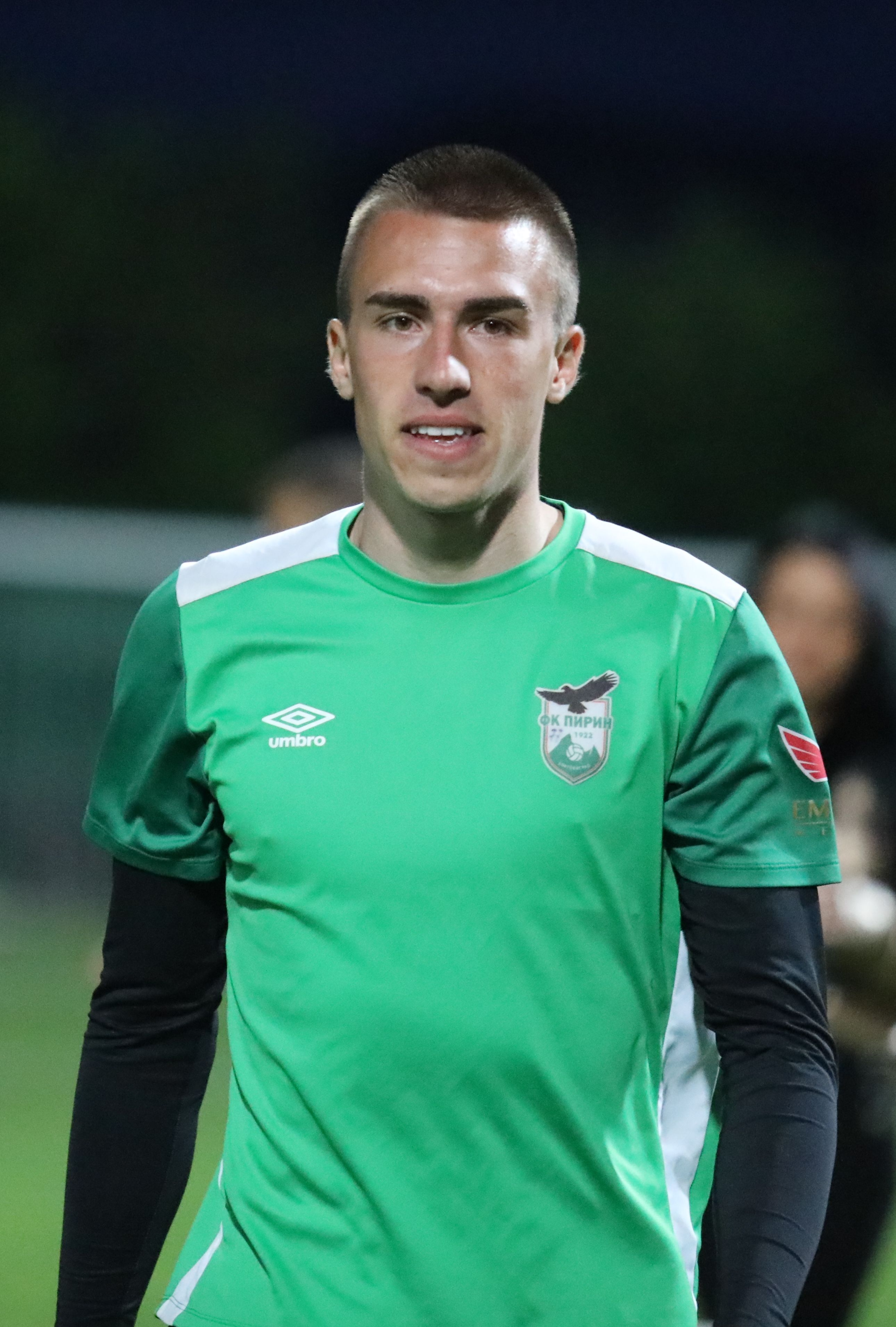

Personal information
- Full name: Dimitar Georgiev Sheytanov
- Date of birth: March 15, 1999 (age 27)
- Place of birth: Sofia, Bulgaria
- Height: 1.91 m (6 ft 3 in)
- Position: Goalkeeper

Team information
- Current team: CSKA 1948
- Number: 13

Youth career
- –2007: PAS Giannina
- 2007–2014: FC Obelya Sofia
- 2014–2019: Levski Sofia
- 2018–2019: → Leeds United (loan)

Senior career*
Years	Team	Apps	(Gls)
2019–2020	Aves	2	(0)
2020–2021	Pirin Blagoevgrad	4	(0)
2022–2025	Septemvri Sofia	118	(0)
2025–	CSKA 1948	20	(0)

International career^{‡}
2015–2016	Bulgaria U17	6	(0)
2017–2018	Bulgaria U19	7	(0)
2025–	Bulgaria	2	(0)
- * Club domestic league appearances and goals as of 11 June 2026 ‡ National team caps and goals as of 5 June 2026

Dimitar Georgiev Sheytanov (Bulgarian: Димитър Георгиев Шейтанов; born 15 March 1999) is a Bulgarian professional footballer who plays as a goalkeeper for First League club CSKA 1948 Sofia and the Bulgaria national team.

== Professional career ==
Sheytanov started his career at early age at PAS Giannina, while his father played for the team, joining after this to the FC Obelya academy and eventually at Levski Sofia in 2014. After a season long loan to Leeds United Academy, Sheytanov signed a professional contract with Aves in 2019. Sheytanov made his professional debut with Aves in a 4-0 Primeira Liga loss to S.L. Benfica on 21 July 2020. He left the club on 18 September, after the team didn't receive a license for LigaPro.

Sheytanov earned his first cap for the national team on 6 June 2025, playing during the second half of the 2:2 draw with Cyprus in a friendly match.

== Personal life ==
Sheytanov is the son of the retired footballer Georgi Sheytanov.
