= FC Sevlievo =

Bulgarian football club

- Full name: Football Club Sevlievo
- Founded: December 29, 1922; 103 years ago as SC Rakovski
- Ground: Stadion Rakovski, Sevlievo
- Capacity: 5,000
- Manager: Nikolay Panayotov
- League: Second League
- 2024–25: North-West Third League, 1st (promoted)
- Website: fcsevlievo.com
Home colours	Away colours

FC Sevlievo (Bulgarian: ФК Севлиево) is a Bulgarian association football club based in Sevlievo, which currently competes in Second League, the second tier of Bulgarian football league system. Their home ground is Stadion Rakovski, which currently has a capacity of 5000.

Founded as SC Rakovski in December 1922, the club was declared bankrupt in 2015 and re-founded as FC Sevlievo.

== History ==
=== 1922–1996: Rakovski ===
The club was founded on 29 December 1922 as SC Rakovski by a group of football enthusiasts of the Association for Tourism in Rositsa. Upon its formation, Ivan Tsochev, Boris Popivanov, and Serafim Ganushev became the president, secretary, and steward respectively. Brothers Sokurov, who played on the team, chose to name it Rakovski in honor of the Bulgarian national hero Georgi Sava Rakovski. They played their first game against Viktoria F.C. from Veliko Tarnovo, ending in a 1:1 draw.

After the reorganization of some of the sports associations in Bulgaria, some voluntary sports organizations arose in Sevlievo. The most popular was DSO Red Flag (Bulgarian: ДСО Червено знаме). In 1957, every voluntary sports organizations union in VSO Rakovski. Two years later Rakovski was admitted into the Bulgarian Third Division. In 1968 the club was promoted for the first time to B PFG, the second division of Bulgarian football.

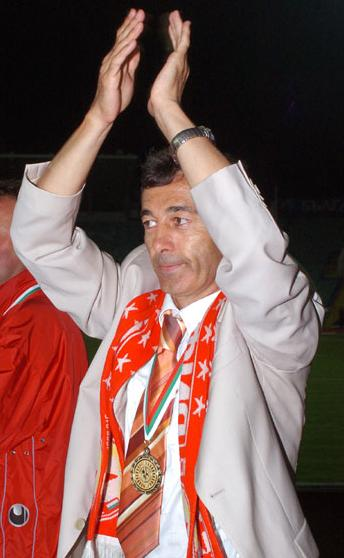
Plamen Markov led Sevlievo to their first promotion in 2002–03.

In 1980, the club was renamed F.C. Rositsa.

=== 1997–2015: Vidima-Rakovski ===
The team became known as PFC Vidima-Rakovski in 1997, after the union between F.C. Rakovski and F.C. Vidima, a little club of the Vidima Standart Ideal works. In the next 1998–99 season, the team won the Cup of Amateur Bulgarian league.

In the 2002–03 season, with Plamen Markov as head coach, Vidima won promotion to the A Group for the first time ever. Gerasim Zakov scored the club's first top league goal in a 3–3 draw against Lokomotiv Sofia. The 2003-04 campaign, remembered as the first A PFG season in the club's history, ended in a good 12th place. In the same season, Vidima-Rakovski had their best Bulgarian Cup run, beating Kameno and Belasitsa Petrich before losing to Lokomotiv Sofia in the quarter-finals. In the next campaign, Vidima won just nine games and was relegated back to the second level after two years among the best.

After the 2006-07 season, Vidima-Rakovski finished 2nd in B PFG, and managed to participate in the play-off for promotion to the A PFG. On June 2, 2007, Vidima won the play-off against PFC Naftex Burgas with a result of 1-0 and qualified for the first division for the second time in the club's history. However, Vidima largely struggled during the 2007-08 season, at the end not managing to avoid relegation once more.

In 2010, Vidima won a third promotion to the top division by winning the Western B PFG. They finished at 14th place in A PFG in the next season and secured their top division status after winning a relegation play-off against Sportist Svoge, which Vidima won after a penalty shoot-out.

In the 2011-12 season, the team finished 14th in the league, winning only 3 out of 30 matches. As a result, Vidima was relegated once more and competed in B PFG in the 2012–2013 season. The team began experiencing financial problems at the time and was relegated from the B Group in 2013.

=== 2025–present: FC Sevlievo ===
The club re-formed as FC Sevlievo on 4 June 2015, after Vidima Rakovski declared bankruptcy.

== Honours ==
- First League:
  - 12th place (1): 2003–04
- Bulgarian Cup:
  - Quarter-finals: - 2003–04
- Second League:
  - Winners (1): 2009–10
  - 2nd place (1): 2006–07
  - 3rd place (1): 2002–03
- Cup of Bulgarian Amateur Football League
  - Winners (1): 1998/99

== Players ==
=== First-team squad ===
As of 12 June 2026

Note: Flags indicate national team as defined under FIFA eligibility rules; some limited exceptions apply. Players may hold more than one non-FIFA nationality.

No.	Pos.	Nation	Player
1	GK	UKR	Hennadiy Hanyev
3	DF	BUL	Mihail Tsonev (on loan from Chernomorets Burgas)
5	DF	BUL	Petko Ganev
6	DF	GRE	Christoforos Karagiannis
7	DF	BUL	David Mihalev
8	MF	BUL	Roman Rodopski
9	FW	BUL	Emil Kolev
11	MF	GHA	Edwin Gyasi
12	GK	BUL	Dimitar Pantev
14	DF	BUL	Georgi Nikolov
16	MF	BUL	Nikolay Yankov
18	DF	BUL	Petar Kepov

No.	Pos.	Nation	Player
19	MF	BUL	Ivaylo Mihaylov
21	DF	BUL	Valentin Tsvetanov
23	MF	BUL	Martin Banev (on loan from Cherno More)
24	FW	BUL	Preslav Antonov
28	MF	BUL	Viktor Ergin
29	FW	SOM	Ayuub Ahmed-Nur
31	FW	BUL	Andrian Dimitrov
33	FW	BUL	Tonislav Donkov
55	DF	BUL	Mihail Minkov
83	DF	BUL	Ivan Penev
93	FW	BUL	Dobrin Petrov

== Managers ==
Dates	Name	Honours
2015–2016	(Bulgaria) Milen Vankov	
2016–2017	(Bulgaria) Martin Doychev	
2017	(Bulgaria) Milen Vankov	
2017–2020	(Bulgaria) Anatoli Tonov	
2021–2022	(Bulgaria) Ferario Spasov	
2022	(Bulgaria) Iliyan Trifonov	
2022–2023	(Bulgaria) Dimitar Todorov	
2023–2025	(Bulgaria) Sasho Angelov	
2025	(Bulgaria) Todor Kolev	
2025–	(Bulgaria) Nikolay Panayotov	

== Seasons ==
=== Past seasons ===
Results of league and cup competitions by season
Season	League											Bulgarian Cup	Other competitions	Top goalscorer	
Season	Division	Level	P	W	D	L	F	A	GD	Pts	Pos	Bulgarian Cup	Other competitions	Top goalscorer	
2015–16	V Group	3	30	13	3	14	49	56	-7	42	9th	DNQ			
2016–17	Third League	3	28	18	4	6	69	33	+36	58	3rd	DNQ			
2017–18	Third League	3	30	20	4	6	60	27	+33	64	2nd	First round			
2018–19	Third League	3	30	18	5	7	50	27	+23	59	3rd	DNQ			
2019–20	Third League	3	13	9	2	2	33	13	+20	29	2nd	Preliminary round			
2020–21	Third League	3	34	18	7	9	55	30	+25	61	4th	Round of 32			
2021–22	Third League	3	32	23	4	5	64	22	+42	73	2nd	Preliminary round		(Bulgaria) Dobrin Petrov	14
2022–23	Third League	3	30	16	3	11	65	30	+35	51	6th	Round of 32		(Bulgaria) Galin Stoyanov	15
2023–24	Third League	3	28	19	4	5	69	22	+47	61	3rd	Preliminary round		(Bulgaria) Dobrin Petrov	13
2024–25	Third League	3										DNQ			

==== Key ====
- GS = Group stage
- QF = Quarter-finals
- SF = Semi-finals

Champions	Runners-up	Promoted	Relegated

== Shirt and sponsors ==
Period	Kit manufacturer	Shirt partner
2015–2017	(Japan) ASICS	none
2017–2022	(Bulgaria) Krasiko	Libra
2022–	(Bulgaria) Krasiko	ELITBET

== Sevlievo Ladies ==
FC Sevlievo Ladies
- Full name: Football Club Sevlievo Ladies
- Ground: Rakovski Stadium, Sevlievo
- Capacity: 5,000
- Manager: Yoanna Dzhambazova
- League: Bulgarian Women's League
- 2024–25: 6th

The football club also has a women's sports department named FC Sevlievo Ladies, currently playing in the top tier of Bulgarian Bulgarian Women's League football, Bulgarian Women's League.

=== First-team squad ===
As of 26 August 2023

Note: Flags indicate national team as defined under FIFA eligibility rules; some limited exceptions apply. Players may hold more than one non-FIFA nationality.

No.	Pos.	Nation	Player
1	DF	BUL	Bilyana Ivanova
2	DF	BUL	Aysu Bezhkova
5	DF	BUL	Yoana Tomova
6	DF	BUL	Viyara Peliteva
7	MF	BUL	Antoniya Angelova
8	MF	BUL	Desislava Dimitrova
9	FW	BUL	Aneliya Kukunova
10	FW	BUL	Elena Petkova
11	MF	BUL	Mihaela Marinova
12	GK	BUL	Eleonora Kolesnikova

No.	Pos.	Nation	Player
13	DF	BUL	Hristiyana Kovacheva
14	MF	BUL	Zara Georgieva
15	DF	BUL	Monika Simonova
17	MF	BUL	Elena Lukanova
19	FW	BUL	Vesela Petkova
20	MF	GEO	Ana Makharadze
21	FW	BUL	Ivayla Kieva
22	DF	BUL	Vili Karadakova (captain)
23	GK	BUL	Victoria Ivanova
77	MF	BUL	Silviya Naydenova

=== Past seasons ===
Season	League	Place	W	D	L	GF	GA	Pts
2015–16	Bulgarian women's football championship (I)	7	4	4	10	21	51	16
2016–17	Bulgarian women's football championship	–	–	–	–	–	–	–
Green marks a season followed by promotion, red a season followed by relegation.
