= Martin Haydarov =

Bulgarian footballer

Personal information
- Full name: Martin Hristov Haydarov
- Date of birth: 22 January 2003 (age 23)
- Place of birth: Plovdiv, Bulgaria
- Height: 1.70 m (5 ft 7 in)
- Position: Forward

Team information
- Current team: Hebar
- Number: 55

Youth career
- Botev Plovdiv
- –2020: Levski Sofia

Senior career*
Years	Team	Apps	(Gls)
2021–2023	CSKA 1948	13	(0)
2021–2023	→ CSKA 1948 II	8	(0)
2022–2023	→ CSKA 1948 III	13	(0)
2023–2025	Lokomotiv Plovdiv II	20	(1)
2024–2025	Lokomotiv Plovdiv	15	(1)
2025	Yantra Gabrovo	3	(0)
2025–	Hebar	10	(1)

International career
2019–2020	Bulgaria U17	8	(0)
2021	Bulgaria U19	5	(0)
- * Club domestic league appearances and goals as of 30 December 2025

Martin Haydarov (Bulgarian: Мартин Хайдаров; born 22 January 2003) is a Bulgarian footballer who plays as a forward for Hebar Pazardzhik.

== Career ==
Nikolov joined CSKA 1948 coming from the Levski Sofia academy. He made his professional debut for the team in a league match against his youth club Levski Sofia on 28 February 2021.

== Career statistics ==
=== Club ===
As of 23 March 2021

Club performance			League		Cup		Continental		Other		Total	
Club	League	Season	Apps	Goals	Apps	Goals	Apps	Goals	Apps	Goals	Apps	Goals
Bulgaria			League		Bulgarian Cup		Europe		Other (Note: Includes Bulgarian Supercup matches.)		Total	
CSKA 1948	First League	2020–21	2	0	0	0	–		–		2	0
CSKA 1948	Total		2	0	0	0	0	0	0	0	2	0
Career statistics			2	0	0	0	0	0	0	0	2	0
