= Christoforos Karagiannis =

Greek footballer

Personal information
- Date of birth: 9 December 1999 (age 26)
- Place of birth: Athens, Greece
- Height: 1.75 m (5 ft 9 in)
- Position: Right-back

Team information
- Current team: Sevlievo
- Number: 6

Youth career
- Lamia

Senior career*
Years	Team	Apps	(Gls)
2019–2020	Lamia	1	(0)
2020–2021	Kallithea	13	(0)
2021	Atalanti		
2021–2022	Kavala	15	(0)
2022–2023	OF Ierapetra	22	(0)
2023–2025	Panachaiki	44	(1)
2025–	Sevlievo	29	(0)
- * Club domestic league appearances and goals as of 11 June 2026

Christoforos Karagiannis (Greek: Χριστόφορος Καραγιάννης; born 9 December 1999) is a Greek professional footballer who plays as a right-back for Bulgarian Second League club Sevlievo.
