= Anastas Pemperski =

Bulgarian footballer (born 2003)

Personal information
- Full name: Anastas Dimitrov Pemperski
- Date of birth: 13 January 2003 (age 23)
- Place of birth: Bulgaria
- Height: 1.83 m (6 ft 0 in)
- Position: Defender

Team information
- Current team: Etar Veliko Tarnovo
- Number: 13

Youth career
- Ludogorets Razgrad

Senior career*
Years	Team	Apps	(Gls)
2020–2025	Ludogorets III	30	(3)
2021–2025	Ludogorets II	73	(1)
2024–2025	Ludogorets Razgrad	1	(0)
2025–	Etar Veliko Tarnovo	39	(1)

International career
2021	Bulgaria U19	6	(0)
- * Club domestic league appearances and goals as of 03:49, 31 October 2026 (UTC)

Anastas Pemperski (Bulgarian: Анастас Пемперски; born 30 November 2002) is a Bulgarian footballer who plays as a defender for Etar Veliko Tarnovo.

== Career ==
Pemperski completed his First League debut for Ludogorets Razgrad on 29 May 2024 in a match against Levski Sofia.
