= Nikolay Panayotov =

Bulgarian football manager (born 1994)

Personal information
- Full name: Nikolay Dimitrov Panayotov
- Date of birth: 22 April 1994 (age 32)
- Place of birth: Burgas, Bulgaria
- Position: Midfielder

Team information
- Current team: Lokomotiv GO

Youth career
- Neftochimic 1986

Senior career*
Years	Team	Apps	(Gls)
2011–2014	Neftochimic 1986		
2014–2015	Bdin Vidin		

Managerial career
- 2015–2021: DIT Sofia (youth coach)
- 2021–2023: CSKA 1948 (youth coach)
- 2023–2024: CSKA 1948
- 2024: Lokomotiv GO (assistant)
- 2024–2025: Lokomotiv GO
- 2025–2026: Sevlievo
- 2026–: Lokomotiv GO
- * Club domestic league appearances and goals

Nikolay Panayotov (Bulgarian: Николай Панайотов; born 22 April 1994) is a Bulgarian manager, who currently works as a caretaker manager for Lokomotiv Gorna Oryahovitsa.

== Career ==
Panayotov began playing in the local Neftochimic Academy and in 2011 he started training with the first team. He later moved to Bdin Vidin, playing in the Bulgarian Third League, before deciding to retire and moving to coaching career.

He started his career as youth manager at DIT Sofia, an academy supported by Septemvri Sofia, at the age of just 20. He moved to CSKA 1948 in the summer of 2021, where he led the under 17 team. Panayotov was promoted to manager of the main team on 15 August 2023, becoming one of youngest managers ever, leading a Bulgarian club, at the age of 28.

== Managerial statistics ==
As of 5 April 2024

Team	From	To	Record							
Team	From	To	G	W	D	L	Win %	GF	GA	GD
CSKA 1948	15 August 2023	5 April 2024	26	10	7	9	38.46	28	29	–1
Total			26	10	7	9	38.46	28	29	–1
