= Kolyo Stanev =

Bulgarian footballer

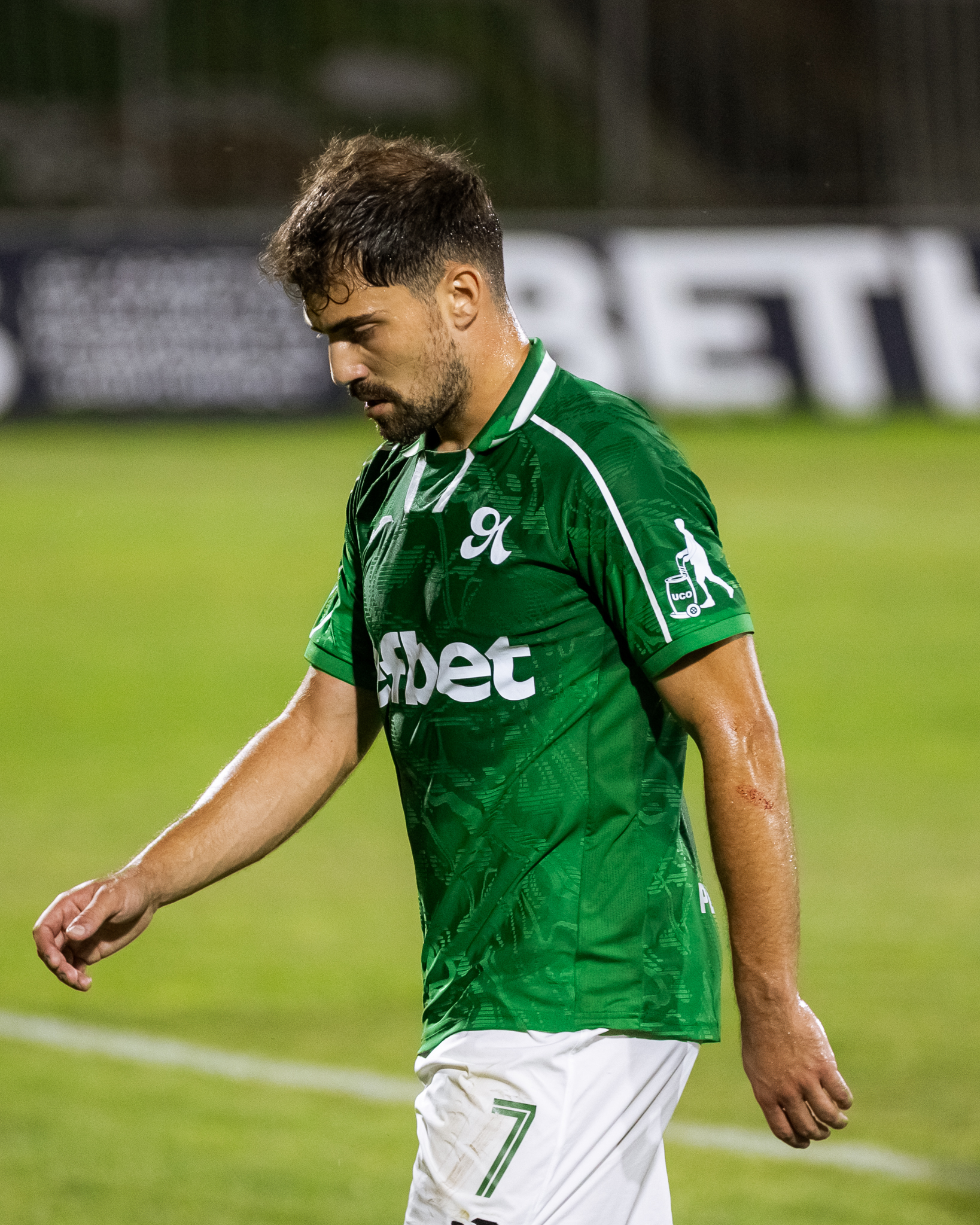

Personal information
- Full name: Kolyo Stanislavov Stanev
- Date of birth: 10 October 2001 (age 25)
- Place of birth: Veliko Tarnovo, Bulgaria
- Height: 1.76 m (5 ft 9 in)
- Position: Right back

Team information
- Current team: Yatra Gabrovo
- Number: 7

Youth career
- Etar

Senior career*
Years	Team	Apps	(Gls)
2017–2025	Etar	136	(6)
2025–2026	Dobrudzha	6	(0)
2026–	Yatra Gabrovo	10	(0)

International career^{‡}
2019	Bulgaria U19	2	(0)
2021–2022	Bulgaria U21	3	(0)
- * Club domestic league appearances and goals as of 31 October 2026 ‡ National team caps and goals as of 19:57, 16 October 2021 (UTC)

Kolyo Stanev (Bulgarian: Кольо Станев; born 10 October 2001) is a Bulgarian footballer who plays as a defender for Yatra Gabrovo.

== Career ==
On 20 September 2017, Stanev made his professional debut at 15 years old as an 83rd-minute substitute for Erik Pochanski in a 4–2 Bulgarian Cup win over Pomorie at Lazur Stadium. He made his First League debut as a substitute for Ventsislav Vasilev in the 2–0 win over Septemvri Sofia at Vasil Levski National Stadium on 1 September 2018.
