= Nikolay Yankov =

Bulgarian footballer (born 1999)

Personal information
- Full name: Nikolay Plamenov Yankov
- Date of birth: 28 June 1999 (age 27)
- Place of birth: Veliko Tarnovo, Bulgaria
- Height: 1.76 m (5 ft 9 in)
- Position: Midfielder

Team information
- Current team: Sevlievo
- Number: 16

Youth career
- Etar
- –2016: Litex
- 2016–2018: CSKA Sofia

Senior career*
Years	Team	Apps	(Gls)
2016–2017	CSKA Sofia II	5	(0)
2018	CSKA Sofia	1	(0)
2018–2020	Litex	34	(1)
2020–2021	Hebar	6	(0)
2021–2025	Etar	108	(10)
2025	Akademik Svishtov	11	(2)
2025–	Sevlievo	11	(0)

International career^{‡}
2018	Bulgaria U19	2	(0)
- * Club domestic league appearances and goals as of 11 June 2026 ‡ National team caps and goals as of 16 February 2022

Nikolay Plamenov Yankov (Bulgarian: Николай Пламенов Янков; born 28 June 1999) is a Bulgarian professional footballer who plays as a midfielder for Sevlievo.

== Career ==
On 20 May 2018, Yankov made his First League debut playing for CSKA Sofia. He came in as a substitute for Henrique Rafael in the 1–0 win over Beroe at Balgarska Armia Stadium

Yankov spent next two and a half seasons playing for Litex before joining Hebar Pazardzhik on 17 December 2020. On 27 June 2021, Yankov signed with Etar Veliko Tarnovo
