= Karim Attoumani =

Comorian footballer (born 2001)

Personal information
- Date of birth: 24 March 2001 (age 25)
- Place of birth: Saint-Denis, France
- Height: 1.87 m (6 ft 2 in)
- Position: Centre-back

Team information
- Current team: Slavia Sofia
- Number: 5

Youth career
- 2013–2014: AG JS Deux-Rives
- 2014: Parfin
- 2014–2015: JS Champ-Bornoise
- 2015–2017: Parfin
- 2017–2019: OCSA Léopards
- 2019–2021: Montpellier

Senior career*
Years	Team	Apps	(Gls)
2019–2021	Montpellier B	0	(0)
2021–2023	Dijon B	26	(1)
2023	Sainte-Suzanne	6	(1)
2024–2025	Saint-Pierroise	14	(1)
2025	Slavia Sofia	0	(0)

International career^{‡}
2022	Comoros U20	3	(0)
2022–	Comoros	2	(0)
- * Club domestic league appearances and goals as of 4 August 2025 ‡ National team caps and goals as of 4 August 2025

Karim Attoumani (born 24 March 2001) is a professional footballer who last played as a centre-back for Slavia Sofia. Born in France, he plays for the Comoros national team.

== Career ==
Attoumani began playing football at the age of 13 at the behest of his father, and is a youth product of the academies of the Réunionnais clubs AG JS Deux-Rives, Parfin, JS Champ-Bornoise, OCSA Léopards, before moving to mainland France with Montpellier in 2019. On 23 September 2021, he moved to the reserves of Dijon. In July 2025, he joined Bulgarian club Slavia Sofia, but left the team by mutual consent just a month later due to serious injury issues.

== International career ==
Born in Réunion, France, Attoumani is Comorian descent. He represented the Comoros U20 at the 2022 Maurice Revello Tournament. He was called up to the senior Comoros national team for a set of friendlies in September 2022. He made his debut with Comoros 1–0 friendly loss to Tunisia on 22 September 2022.
