= Stiliyan Tisovski =

Bulgarian footballer (born 2003)

Personal information
- Full name: Stiliyan Emilov Tisovski
- Date of birth: 1 October 2003 (age 23)
- Place of birth: Pazardzhik, Bulgaria
- Height: 1.75 m (5 ft 9 in)
- Position: Attacking midfielder

Team information
- Current team: Hebar
- Number: 84

Youth career
- 2015–2020: Hebar

Senior career*
Years	Team	Apps	(Gls)
2020–2022	Hebar II	44	(14)
2020–2025	Hebar	42	(0)
2025	Yantra Gabrovo	7	(0)
2025–	Hebar	12	(2)
- * Club domestic league appearances and goals as of 11 June 2026

Stiliyan Emilov Tisovski (Bulgarian: Стилиян Емилов Тисовски; born 1 October 2003) is a Bulgarian footballer who plays as an attacking midfielder for Bulgarian Second League club Hebar Pazardzhik.

== Career ==
Tisovski spent his youth years at the academy of Hebar Pazardzhik from 2015 to 2020. On 16 May 2020, he made his debut for the first team against Litex Lovech. In February 2023, he signed his first professional contract with the team.
