= Vladimir Gogov =

Bulgarian footballer (born 1997)

Personal information
- Full name: Vladimir Boykov Gogov
- Date of birth: 6 September 1997 (age 29)
- Place of birth: Samuilovo, Bulgaria
- Height: 1.83 m (6 ft 0 in)
- Position: Defensive midfielder

Team information
- Current team: Sportist Svoge
- Number: 18

Youth career
- –2016: Pirin Blagoevgrad

Senior career*
| Years | Team | Apps | (Gls) |
| 2016–2018 | Minyor Pernik | 24 | (3) |
| 2018–2020 | Septemvri Simitli | 60 | (5) |
| 2021 | Belasitsa Petrich | 15 | (1) |
| 2021 | CSKA 1948 II | 14 | (0) |
| 2021 | CSKA 1948 | 4 | (0) |
| 2022 | Academica Clinceni | 10 | (0) |
| 2022–2025 | Belasitsa Petrich | 90 | (2) |
| 2025– | Sportist Svoge | 23 | (1) |
- * Club domestic league appearances and goals as of 11 June 2026

Vladimir Boykov Gogov (Bulgarian: Владимир Бойков Гогов; born 16 February 1997) is a Bulgarian professional footballer who plays as a defensive midfielder for Bulgarian Second league side Sportist Svoge. In his career, Gogov also played for Minyor Pernik, Septemvri Simitli, CSKA 1948 Sofia and Academica Clinceni.
