= SFC Etar Veliko Tarnovo =

Bulgarian football club

FC Etar Veliko Tarnovo
- Full name: Sports Football Club; Etar Veliko Tarnovo
- Nickname: Болярите (The Bolyars)
- Founded: 2013; 13 years ago
- Ground: Stadion Ivaylo; Veliko Tarnovo, Bulgaria
- Capacity: 15,000
- Chairman: Lyubomir Filipov
- Head coach: Ivan Ivanov
- League: Second League
- 2025–26: Second League, 7th of 17
- Website: etarvt.bg
Home colours	Away colours	Third colours

Etar (Bulgarian: Етър) is a Bulgarian sports football club based in Veliko Tarnovo, that plays in the Bulgarian Second League, the second level of Bulgarian football.

Etar was established in 2013, shortly after the folding of Etar 1924, which was dissolved for financial reasons after the 2012–13 season. Etar 1924, on the other hand, was established as a result of the dissolution of the historical FC Etar (Veliko Tarnovo). Although the three clubs share similar names and colors, the Bulgarian Football Union considers them separate entities and records are not shared between the three. The current Etar quickly ascended from the amateur leagues, eventually promoting to the Bulgarian First League at the end of the 2016–17 season. The club's home ground has been Ivaylo Stadium since 2013. Etar plays in all-violet kits and their nickname is 'The Bolyars'.

== History ==
=== Foundation and Amateur League (2013–2016) ===
The club was founded as OFC Etar Veliko Tarnovo in 2013 with the license of FC Botev Debelets. In their first season they finished in 5th position in V Group.

In January 2016, Boncho Genchev became the new manager of the team which was in 3rd place at the halfway point in the season, only two points behind the 1st place team. The selection included Lyubomir Genchev coming from A Group team Montana, Stefan Hristov from Spartak Pleven and the leading goalscorer in the first part of 2015–16 season in B Group, Petar Dimitrov. The team eventually won all its matches, winning the league and being promoted to B Group.

=== Professional Football (2016–present) ===
On 9 June 2016 Etar were officially approved for the new 2nd division — Second League, with the club changing its abbreviation to "SFC Etar". Ferario Spasov remains in his position as manager and with a good selection team made promotion to First League. Etar were promoted as champions of the 2016–17 Second League, sealing their title on the final day of the season with a 2–2 away draw against Nesebar, coupled with Septemvri Sofia's 2–0 away defeat to Oborishte.

Etar's first season into the elite was difficult. The team finished 13th in the regular phase, with only four wins. This placed Etar as one of the candidates for relegation. In the relegation phase, Etar finished last in their group and had to play playoff/play out matches in order to remain in the elite. In the first round, Etar beat Pirin Blagoevgrad 3-1 aggregate and advanced to the second round. There, the violets faced Dunav Ruse. Two strong matches resulted in a 4-1 aggregate win, and Etar secured their status as a member of the top tier.

On 4 January 2018 Krasimir Balakov was announced as the new manager in the club with Stanislav Genchev, Iliyan Kiryakov and Kaloyan Chakarov as first team coaches.

After 4 seasons in the First League, Etar was relegated to the Second League at the end of the 2020-21 season. Back into the second tier, Etar managed to finish in fourth place during the 2021–22 season, qualifying for promotion playoffs. Etar, however, lost against Botev Vratsa and did not manage to return to the First League immediately. Next season (2022–23), Etar managed to finish in second place, securing promotion to the First League after two years of absence.

== Nickname, shirt and colors ==
Their main nicknames are the Bolyars and the Violets, the latter in reference to the colour of their home kit, which is often mistaken for purple.

Period	Kit manufacturer	Shirt partner
2013–2016	(Spain) Joma	Britos
2016–2017	(Spain) Joma	None
2017–2022	(Spain) Joma	WinBet
2022–2024	(United States) Nike	WinBet
2024–	(Spain) Joma	WinBet

== Honours ==
=== Domestic ===
- Second League:
  - Winners (1): 2016–17
- Third League:
  - Winners (1): 2015–16

== Players ==
=== Current squad ===
As of 2 July 2026 Note: Flags indicate national team as defined under FIFA eligibility rules; some limited exceptions apply. Players may hold more than one non-FIFA nationality.

No.	Pos.	Nation	Player
1	GK	BUL	Angel Martinov
2	DF	BUL	Petar Zografov
4	DF	BUL	Georgi Aleksandrov (captain)
5	DF	BUL	Rosen Varbishki
6	MF	BUL	Georgi Ivanov
7	MF	BUL	Rosen Ivanov
8	MF	BUL	Viktor Vasilev
9	FW	BUL	Toma Ushagelov
10	MF	BUL	Chavdar Ivaylov
11	MF	BUL	Stefan Traykov
13	DF	BUL	Anastas Pemperski
14	MF	BUL	Radoslav Naydenov
15	DF	BUL	Nikola Borisov

No.	Pos.	Nation	Player
16	MF	BUL	Steliyan Dobrev
17	MF	BUL	Atanas Atanasov
18	FW	BUL	Petar Petrov
19	FW	BUL	Kristiyan Velichkov
20	MF	BUL	Martin Borisov (on loan from Levski Sofia II)
21	MF	BUL	Ivaylo Markov
22	GK	BUL	Aleksandar Hristov
23	GK	BUL	Nikola Videnov
24	MF	BUL	Hristiyan Tsvetkov
25	FW	BUL	Stiviyan Makaveev
27	FW	BUL	Tsvetomir Tsanev
28	MF	BUL	Kostadin Belaliev
77	DF	BUL	Martin Nikolov

For recent transfers, see Transfers winter 2025–26 and Transfers summer 2026.

=== Foreign players ===
Up to five non-EU nationals can be registered and given a squad number for the first team in the Bulgarian First Professional League however only three can be used in a match day. Those non-EU nationals with European ancestry can claim citizenship from the nation their ancestors came from. If a player does not have European ancestry he can claim Bulgarian citizenship after playing in Bulgaria for 5 years.

EU Nationals

EU Nationals (Dual citizenship)

Non-EU Nationals

=== Reserve team ===
Etar II (Bulgarian: Етър II) is a Bulgarian football team based in Veliko Tarnovo. It is the reserve team of Etar Veliko Tarnovo, and currently plays in Third League, the third level of Bulgarian football.

As of 14 April 2026

Note: Flags indicate national team as defined under FIFA eligibility rules; some limited exceptions apply. Players may hold more than one non-FIFA nationality.

No.	Pos.	Nation	Player
1	GK	BUL	Aleksandar Hristov
2	DF	BUL	Boyan Valchev
3	DF	BUL	David Dimitrov
4	FW	BUL	Stefan Yordanov
8	FW	BUL	Kaloyan Nenchev
9	FW	BUL	Dimitar Baydakov
10	MF	BUL	Kristiyan Kanchev
12	GK	BUL	Radoslav Rashkov
14	DF	BUL	Marin Pendov

No.	Pos.	Nation	Player
25	DF	BUL	Viktor Spasov
—	DF	BUL	Antoni Angelov
—	DF	BUL	Hristiyan Zahariev
—	MF	BUL	Trayan Dimitrov
—	MF	BUL	Evgeni Peychev
—	MF	BUL	Rafael Cholakov
—	MF	BUL	Aleksandar Todorov
—	FW	BUL	Yoan Marinov
—	FW	BUL	Ivaylo Chapkanov

== Notable players ==
Had international caps for their respective countries, held any club record, or had more than 100 league appearances. Players whose name is listed in bold represented their countries.

Bulgaria

- (Bulgaria) Georgi Aleksandrov
- (Bulgaria) **Georgi Angelov**
- (Bulgaria) **Preslav Borukov**
- (Bulgaria) **Ivaylo Dimitrov**
- (Bulgaria) **Plamen Galabov**
- (Bulgaria) **Stanislav Genchev**
- (Bulgaria) Zdravko Iliev
- (Bulgaria) **Hristo Ivanov**
- (Bulgaria) **Ivan Ivanov**
- (Bulgaria) Mariyan Ivanov
- (Bulgaria) **Svetoslav Kovachev**
- (Bulgaria) **Veselin Minev**
- (Bulgaria) **Daniel Mladenov**
- (Bulgaria) **Georgi Pashov**
- (Bulgaria) Yani Pehlivanov
- (Bulgaria) Ivan Petkov
- (Bulgaria) **Georgi Sarmov**
- (Bulgaria) Kolyo Stanev
- (Bulgaria) **Ivan Stoyanov**
- (Bulgaria) Krum Stoyanov
- (Bulgaria) **Ventsislav Vasilev**
- (Bulgaria) **Preslav Yordanov**

Europe

- (Estonia) **Artjom Artjunin**

CONCACAF

- (Panama) **José Córdoba**
- (Panama) **Romeesh Ivey**
- (Mexico) **Josecarlos Van Rankin**

Africa

- (Cape Verde) **Gilson Varela**
- (Gabon) **Gaëtan Missi Mezu**
- (The Gambia) **Alasana Manneh**
- (Senegal) **Alioune Badará**

== Goalscoring and appearance records ==
As of 31 October 2026

**Most domestic league appearances for the club**

Rank	Name	Career	Appearances
1	(Bulgaria) **Georgi Aleksandrov**	2022–present	141
2	(Bulgaria) Kolyo Stanev	2017–2025	136
3	(Bulgaria) Hristo Ivanov	2017–2023	127
—	(Bulgaria) Yani Pehlivanov	2017–2023	127
5	(Bulgaria) Daniel Mladenov	2017–2019; 2021–2023	126
6	(Bulgaria) Ivan Petkov	2014–2021	121
7	(Bulgaria) Nikolay Yankov	2021–2025	108
8	(Bulgaria) Mariyan Ivanov	2020–2024	99
9	(Bulgaria) Krum Stoyanov	2018–2019; 2022–2024	98
10	(Bulgaria) Zdravko Iliev	2019–2023	94

**Most domestic league goals for the club**

Rank	Name	Career	Goals
1	(Bulgaria) Daniel Mladenov	2017–2019; 2021–2023	41
2	(Bulgaria) Ivan Petkov	2014–2021	40
3	(Bulgaria) Dzhihat Kyamil	2015–2017	21
4	(Bulgaria) Petar Dimitrov	2016	20
5	(Croatia) Lovre Knežević	2021–2022; 2023–2024	15
6	(Bulgaria) Preslav Borukov	2020–2021	12
—	(Bulgaria) Martin Toshev	2023–2024	12
8	(Montenegro) Veljko Batrović	2018–2019	11
—	(Bulgaria) Milcho Angelov	2019–2021	11
—	(Bulgaria) Steven Stoyanchov	2025–2026	11
11	(Senegal) Alioune Badará	2017–2018	10
–	(Bulgaria) Nikolay Yankov	2021–2025	10
–	(Bulgaria) Ivan Kokonov	2024–2025	10

- Players in **bold** are still playing for Etar.

== Past seasons ==
As of 24 May 2026

Season	Tier	Division	Place	Bulgarian Cup
2013–14	3	V Group	5th	DNP
2014–15	3	V Group	2nd	DNP
2015–16	3	V Group	1st↑	DNP
2016–17	2	Second League	1st↑	Round of 32
2017–18	1	First League	11th	Quarter-finals
2018–19	1	First League	7th	Quarter-finals
2019–20	1	First League	10th	Round of 32
2020–21	1	First League	14th↓	Round of 16
2021–22	2	Second League	4th	Round of 16
2022–23	2	Second League	2nd↑	Preliminary round
2023–24	1	First League	16th↓	Round of 16
2024–25	2	Second League	7th	Preliminary round
2025–26	2	Second League	7th	Preliminary round

- Seasons in First League: 5
- Seasons in Second League: 5
- Seasons in V Group (now Third League): 3

== Managers ==
Dates	Name	Honours
2013–2014	(Bulgaria) Sasho Angelov	
2014–2015	(Bulgaria) Kaloyan Chakarov (interim)	
2015–2016	(Bulgaria) Georgi Vasilev	
2016	(Bulgaria) Boncho Genchev	
2016	(Bulgaria) Ferario Spasov	1 V Group title
2017–2018	(Bulgaria) Stanislav Genchev	1 Second League title
2018–2019	(Bulgaria) Krasimir Balakov	
2019	(Bulgaria) Rosen Kirilov	
2019	(Bulgaria) Kaloyan Chakarov (interim)	
2019–2020	(Bulgaria) Petko Petkov	
2020	(Bulgaria) Kaloyan Chakarov (interim)	
2020–2021	(Bulgaria) Aleksandar Tomash	
2021–2022	(Bulgaria) Veselin Velikov	
2022–2023	(Bulgaria) Emanuel Lukanov	
2023	(Bulgaria) Marin Stefanov (interim)	
2023–2024	(Bulgaria) Svetoslav Petrov	
2024–2025	(Bulgaria) Zhivko Zhelev	
2025–present	(Bulgaria) Ivan Ivanov	

== Club officials ==
=== Board of directors ===
Position	Name	Nationality
Chairman	Lyubomir Filipov	(Bulgaria)
Board Member	Deyan Kuzdov	(Bulgaria)
Board Member	Georgi Markov	(Bulgaria)
Board Member	Georgi Tsingov	(Bulgaria)
Board Member	Momchil Ivanov	(Bulgaria)
Board Member	Miroslav Markov	(Bulgaria)
Board Member	Svetoslav Totev	(Bulgaria)

=== Current technical body ===
Position	Name	Nationality
Sports Director	Stefan Atanasov	(Bulgaria)
Administrative Director	Stratsimir Tinchev	(Bulgaria)
Youth Academy Director	Stefan Angelov	(Bulgaria)
Head coach	Ivan Ivanov	(Bulgaria)
Assistant coach	Iliyan Kiryakov	(Bulgaria)
Assistant coach	Ivaylo Dimitrov	(Bulgaria)
Goalkeeper coach	Aleksandar Aleksandrov	(Bulgaria)
Conditioning coach	Stefan Ivanov	(Bulgaria)
Analyst	Denislav Georgiev	(Bulgaria)
Youth Academy Coach	Marin Stefanov	(Bulgaria)
Youth Academy Coach	Iliyan Trifonov	(Bulgaria)
Physiotherapist	Preslav Nikolaev	(Bulgaria)
Kinesiotherapist	Hristiyan Tsonev	(Bulgaria)
Housekeeper	Miroslav Chernev	(Bulgaria)
