= List of Bulgarian football transfers summer 2019 =

This is a list of Bulgarian football transfers for the 2019 summer transfer window. Only transfers involving a team from the two professional leagues, First League and Second League are listed.

== First League ==
=== Arda ===
In:

| No. | Pos. | Nation | Player |
|---|---|---|---|
| 4 | DF | BUL | Milen Stoev (loan return from Pirin Blagoevgrad) |
| 5 | DF | SRB | Zoran Gajić (from (Czech Republic) Fastav Zlín) |
| 6 | DF | ENG | Connor Randall (from (England) Liverpool) |
| 7 | MF | BUL | Spas Delev (from (Poland) Pogoń Szczecin) |
| 8 | MF | ARM | Rumyan Hovsepyan (from (Armenia) Pyunik) |
| 11 | MF | BUL | Aleksandar Georgiev (from CSKA Sofia) |
| 12 | DF | MKD | Darko Glišić (from Septemvri Sofia) |
| 19 | DF | SLE | Alie Sesay (from (Greece) Chania Kissamikos) |
| 24 | DF | ALG | Ilias Hassani (from (Qatar) Al-Gharafa) |
| 25 | DF | BRA | Matheus Leoni (from Beroe) |
| 27 | MF | BUL | Emil Martinov (from (Azerbaijan) Sabail) |
| 30 | MF | POR | João Amorim (from (Portugal) Varzim) |
| 33 | DF | NED | Darren Sidoel (from (England) Reading) |
| 45 | FW | BEL | Elisha Sam (from (Netherlands) FC Eindhoven) |
| 77 | MF | BUL | Mihail Aleksandrov (from (Russia) Arsenal Tula) |
| 91 | GK | BUL | Nikolay Bankov (free agent) |
| 99 | FW | BUL | Radoslav Vasilev (from Cherno More) |
| — | DF | BUL | Ventsislav Vasilev (from Etar) |
| — | MF | BUL | Dimitar Atanasov (from (Canada) Real Mississauga SC) |
| — | FW | BUL | Ivaylo Dimitrov (from Ararat-Armenia) |

Out:

| No. | Pos. | Nation | Player |
|---|---|---|---|
| 3 | DF | BUL | Rumen Sandev (to Septemvri Sofia) |
| 6 | MF | BUL | Ivaylo Naydenov (loan return to Levski Sofia) |
| 7 | MF | BUL | Valchan Chanev (to Botev Galabovo) |
| 8 | MF | BUL | Georgi Chukalov (to Pomorie) |
| 9 | MF | BUL | Veselin Marchev (to Hebar) |
| 11 | MF | BUL | Dimitar Zakonov (loan return to Lokomotiv Plovdiv) |
| 12 | GK | BUL | Veselin Ganev (to Pirin Blagoevgrad) |
| 13 | DF | BUL | Arhan Isuf (loan return to Lokomotiv Plovdiv) |
| 14 | MF | SVN | Ernest Grvala (end of contract) |
| 19 | FW | BUL | Eray Karadayi (on loan to Botev Galabovo) |
| 21 | FW | BUL | Todor Todorov (end of contract) |
| 25 | MF | BUL | Mitko Plahov (to Botev Galabovo) |
| 39 | FW | BUL | Dimitar Aleksiev (to Botev Galabovo) |
| 73 | MF | BUL | Ventsislav Bengyuzov (to Slavia Sofia) |
| 77 | MF | BUL | Vasil Dobrev (loan return to Septemvri Sofia) |
| 91 | FW | BUL | Ventsislav Hristov (to Tsarsko Selo) |
| — | DF | BUL | Ventsislav Vasilev (to CSKA 1948) |
| — | MF | BUL | Dimitar Atanasov (on loan to Botev Galabovo) |
| — | FW | BUL | Ivaylo Dimitrov (on loan to Etar) |

=== Beroe ===
In:

| No. | Pos. | Nation | Player |
|---|---|---|---|
| 1 | GK | BUL | Plamen Kolev (from Botev Galabovo) |
| 17 | MF | GUI | Ibrahima Conté (from (Belgium) Oostende) |
| 18 | DF | BUL | Petko Tsankov (from Vitosha Bistritsa) |
| 21 | FW | SUI | Zoran Josipovic (from (Switzerland) Chiasso) |
| 44 | DF | BUL | Viktor Genev (from Cherno More) |
| 59 | DF | BEL | Ahmed Touba (from (Belgium) Club Brugge) |
| 94 | MF | BUL | Yuliyan Nenov (from (Morocco) DHJ) |

Out:

| No. | Pos. | Nation | Player |
|---|---|---|---|
| 5 | MF | POR | Mesca (to (Cyprus) Doxa Katokopias) |
| 13 | DF | BUL | Emin Ahmed (to Lokomotiv GO, previously on loan at Dunav) |
| 20 | DF | BRA | Matheus Leoni (to Arda) |
| 21 | MF | BUL | Vladimir Gadzhev (to Hebar) |
| 23 | GK | BUL | Georgi Argilashki (to Botev Plovdiv) |
| 24 | MF | BUL | Stoyan Ivanov (on loan to Spartak Varna) |
| 25 | DF | BUL | Nadim Angelov (on loan to Minyor Radnevo) |
| 26 | DF | BUL | Georgi Madzharov (on loan to Chernomorets Burgas) |
| 27 | DF | EST | Nikita Baranov (to (Armenia) Alashkert) |
| 30 | DF | BUL | Valentin Ivanov (on loan to Minyor Radnevo) |

=== Botev Plovdiv ===
In:

| No. | Pos. | Nation | Player |
|---|---|---|---|
| 1 | GK | BUL | Yanko Georgiev (from Septemvri Sofia) |
| 4 | DF | NED | Rodney Klooster (from (Netherlands) FC Eindhoven) |
| 20 | MF | NED | Philippe van Arnhem (from (Slovakia) AS Trenčín) |
| 22 | MF | CRO | Marko Pervan (from (Croatia) NK Osijek) |
| 33 | GK | BUL | Georgi Argilashki (from Beroe) |
| 92 | FW | BRA | Fernando Viana (from (Brazil) Guarani) |
| — | FW | BRA | Taylon (from (Malta) Hibernians) |

Out:

| No. | Pos. | Nation | Player |
|---|---|---|---|
| 10 | FW | CGO | Férébory Doré (released) |
| 16 | MF | BUL | Vasil Shopov (to CSKA 1948) |
| 21 | GK | BUL | Stelian Angelov (on loan to Chernomorets Burgas) |
| 22 | GK | POL | Daniel Kajzer (to (Poland) Śląsk Wrocław) |
| 26 | MF | BUL | Radoslav Apostolov (to Neftochimic) |
| 29 | MF | BUL | Zapro Dinev (to Vitosha Bistritsa) |
| 71 | MF | BUL | Anton Karachanakov (to Tsarsko Selo) |
| 77 | MF | BUL | Milko Georgiev (to CSKA 1948) |
| 99 | GK | BUL | Ivan Čvorović (to Tsarsko Selo) |
| — | FW | BRA | Taylon (to (United Arab Emirates) Al Urooba) |

=== Botev Vratsa ===
In:

| No. | Pos. | Nation | Player |
|---|---|---|---|
| 4 | DF | BUL | Angel Lyaskov (on loan from CSKA Sofia) |
| 8 | MF | BUL | Dominik Yankov (on loan from Ludogorets) |
| 15 | DF | CRO | Filip Žderić (from (Croatia) Zadar) |
| 16 | DF | BUL | Apostol Popov (from CSKA 1948) |
| 21 | MF | BRA | David Ribeiro (on loan from Ludogorets) |
| 28 | MF | BUL | Hristo Zlatinski (free agent) |
| 37 | DF | BUL | Ventsislav Kerchev (from Ludogorets, previously on loan) |
| 39 | DF | BUL | Deyan Ivanov (on loan from Levski Sofia) |
| 86 | FW | BUL | Valeri Bojinov (from Levski Sofia) |
| — | DF | SRB | Ratko Mandić (from (Malta) Sirens) |
| — | MF | GRE | Apostolos Fourtziou (from (Greece) Alexandros Kilkis) |

Out:

| No. | Pos. | Nation | Player |
|---|---|---|---|
| 3 | DF | BUL | Martin Kavdanski (to Tsarsko Selo) |
| 4 | DF | EST | Edgar Tur (loan return to (Estonia) Paide) |
| 8 | MF | BUL | Anton Ognyanov (to Botev Galabovo) |
| 20 | DF | BUL | Kostadin Gadzhalov (to Montana) |
| 22 | DF | EST | Trevor Elhi (to (Finland) SJK) |
| 26 | DF | BUL | Mariyan Ivanov (to Septemvri Sofia) |
| 34 | GK | FRA | Hugo Cointard (to (France) Tours) |
| 71 | MF | BUL | Emil Stoev (loan return to Slavia Sofia) |
| 88 | MF | BUL | Yordan Apostolov (to Etar) |
| — | DF | SRB | Ratko Mandić (released) |
| — | MF | GRE | Apostolos Fourtziou (released) |

=== Cherno More ===
In:

| No. | Pos. | Nation | Player |
|---|---|---|---|
| 9 | FW | BUL | Ismail Isa (from Dunav) |
| 10 | MF | BUL | Ilian Iliev Jr. (from (Portugal) Académica) |
| 11 | MF | ALG | Mehdi Boukassi (from (Portugal) Oliveirense) |
| 18 | GK | SUI | Miodrag Mitrović (free agent) |
| 20 | MF | POR | Jordão Cardoso (from (Portugal) Benfica Castelo Branco) |
| 23 | MF | ROU | Ionuț Neagu (from (Romania) UTA Arad) |
| 27 | DF | BUL | Daniel Dimov (from (Turkey) Boluspor) |
| 44 | DF | GRE | Dimitrios Chantakias (from (Greece) Panetolikos) |
| 93 | DF | NED | Fahd Aktaou (from (Italy) Juve Stabia) |

Out:

| No. | Pos. | Nation | Player |
|---|---|---|---|
| 4 | DF | BUL | Viktor Genev (to Beroe) |
| 9 | MF | ALG | Mehdi Fennouche (released) |
| 10 | FW | BUL | Radoslav Vasilev (to Arda) |
| 11 | FW | BRA | Jorginho (released) |
| 16 | MF | BUL | Petar Vitanov (to Lokomotiv Plovdiv) |
| 17 | DF | BUL | Martin Kostadinov (on loan to Dunav Ruse) |
| 21 | MF | BUL | Georgi Iliev (to Lokomotiv Plovdiv) |
| 36 | GK | BUL | Georgi Kitanov (loan return to CSKA Sofia) |
| 41 | DF | CGO | Hugo Konongo (to (Romania) Sepsi Sfântu Gheorghe) |
| 45 | DF | BUL | Yordan Radev (on loan to Spartak Pleven) |
| 47 | DF | BUL | Martin Dichev (to Dobrudzha) |
| 66 | DF | FRA | Joakim Balmy (to (France) Fréjus St-Raphaël) |
| 70 | DF | BUL | Plamen Dimov (to (Kazakhstan) Okzhetpes) |
| 77 | MF | BUL | Petar Vutsov (on loan to Spartak Pleven) |
| 98 | FW | BUL | Valentin Yoskov (to CSKA 1948, previously on loan at Chernomorets Balchik) |
| — | MF | BUL | Rumen Kasabov (to Pomorie, previously on loan at Chernomorets Balchik) |

=== CSKA Sofia ===
In:

| No. | Pos. | Nation | Player |
|---|---|---|---|
| 7 | MF | RUS | Denis Davydov (from (Russia) Nizhny Novgorod) |
| 8 | MF | IRL | Graham Carey (from (England) Plymouth Argyle) |
| 9 | FW | SCO | Tony Watt (from (Scotland) St Johnstone) |
| 11 | DF | BUL | Petar Zanev (from (Russia) Yenisey) |
| 13 | GK | BRA | Gustavo Busatto (from (Brazil) Ituano) |
| 14 | MF | ENG | Viv Solomon-Otabor (from (England) Birmingham City) |
| 18 | DF | FRA | Bradley Mazikou (from (France) Lorient) |
| 21 | FW | AUS | Tomi Juric (from (Switzerland) Luzern) |
| 23 | MF | BUL | Mitko Mitkov (loan return from Litex) |
| 24 | DF | POR | Nuno Tomás (from (Portugal) Belenenses, previously on loan) |
| 25 | DF | ESP | Raúl Albentosa (from (Spain) Deportivo La Coruña) |
| 28 | DF | BUL | Plamen Galabov (loan return from Etar) |
| — | MF | ITA | Diego Fabbrini (from (Romania) Botoșani) |

Out:

| No. | Pos. | Nation | Player |
|---|---|---|---|
| 1 | GK | CRO | Dante Stipica (to (Poland) Pogoń Szczecin) |
| 4 | DF | BUL | Bozhidar Chorbadzhiyski (on loan to (Romania) FCSB) |
| 7 | MF | GNB | Jorginho (loan return to (France) Saint-Étienne), subsequently to Ludogorets Razgrad |
| 8 | MF | GHA | Edwin Gyasi (on loan to (United States) FC Dallas) |
| 12 | GK | BUL | Slavi Petrov (to Strumska Slava) |
| 14 | DF | BUL | Angel Lyaskov (on loan to Botev Vratsa) |
| 25 | DF | CPV | Steven Pereira (to (Portugal) Santa Clara) |
| 33 | GK | BUL | Georgi Kitanov (to (Romania) Astra, previously on loan at Cherno More) |
| — | MF | BUL | Aleksandar Georgiev (to Arda, previously on loan at Etar) |
| — | MF | BUL | Nikola Kolev (to Etar, previously on loan) |
| — | MF | ITA | Diego Fabbrini (to (Romania) Dinamo București) |

=== Dunav ===
In:

| No. | Pos. | Nation | Player |
|---|---|---|---|
| 5 | DF | BUL | Lyuben Nikolov (from (Cambodia) Visakha) |
| 6 | MF | LBN | Samir Ayass (from (Lebanon) Al Ahed) |
| 7 | MF | BUL | Ivaylo Lazarov (from Vitosha Bistritsa) |
| 10 | MF | RUS | Ivan Selemenev (from (Russia) Chernomorets Novorossiysk) |
| 12 | MF | BRA | Nando (from (Cyprus) PAEEK) |
| 17 | MF | TUR | Berkan Durdu (from (Turkey) Yeni Malatyaspor) |
| 22 | DF | BUL | Mihail Milchev (from Vitosha Bistritsa) |
| 29 | DF | BUL | Rosen Kolev (from (Hong Kong) Pegasus) |
| 33 | GK | UKR | Hennadiy Hanyev (from Vereya) |
| 77 | DF | BUL | Martin Kostadinov (on loan from Cherno More) |
| 99 | FW | BUL | Stefan Hristov (from Vitosha Bistritsa) |
| — | MF | POR | Sandro Semedo (free agent) |

Out:

| No. | Pos. | Nation | Player |
|---|---|---|---|
| 4 | DF | BUL | Petar Patev (to Slavia Sofia) |
| 5 | DF | BUL | Georgi Dinkov (to Spartak Varna) |
| 7 | MF | BUL | Martin Stankev (to Vitosha Bistritsa) |
| 10 | MF | ROU | Dragoș Firțulescu (to (India) Chennaiyin) |
| 12 | GK | BUL | Filip Dimitrov (to Septemvri Sofia, previously on loan at Pirin) |
| 14 | MF | BUL | Bozhidar Vasev (to Hebar) |
| 22 | FW | BUL | Ismail Isa (to Cherno More) |
| 23 | DF | BUL | Iliya Munin (to Bansko) |
| 27 | MF | SEN | Mouhamadou N'Diaye (released) |
| 31 | MF | BUL | Krasimir Stanoev (to Etar) |
| 77 | DF | BUL | Emin Ahmed (loan return to Beroe) |
| 83 | DF | BUL | Hristo Popadiyn (to Slavia Sofia) |
| 86 | GK | BUL | Stanislav Antonov (to Spartak Pleven) |
| 98 | MF | BUL | Svetoslav Kovachev (loan return to Ludogorets) |
| — | MF | POR | Sandro Semedo (released) |

=== Etar ===
In:

| No. | Pos. | Nation | Player |
|---|---|---|---|
| 5 | DF | BUL | Hristofor Hubchev (from (Greece) Larissa) |
| 15 | DF | BUL | Ivan Ivanov (from Vihren) |
| 19 | FW | FRA | Chris Gadi (from (Egypt) Petrojet SC) |
| 22 | MF | BUL | Nikola Kolev (from CSKA Sofia, previously on loan) |
| 23 | DF | BUL | Aleksandar Dyulgerov (from Septemvri Sofia) |
| 31 | MF | BUL | Krasimir Stanoev (from Dunav) |
| 72 | MF | BUL | Erol Dost (on loan from Ludogorets) |
| 98 | MF | BUL | Svetoslav Kovachev (on loan from Ludogorets) |
| 99 | FW | BUL | Ivaylo Dimitrov (on loan from Arda) |
| — | MF | BUL | Yordan Apostolov (from Botev Vratsa) |

Out:

| No. | Pos. | Nation | Player |
|---|---|---|---|
| 5 | MF | BUL | Georgi Sarmov (to (Germany) Chemnitzer FC) |
| 10 | MF | MNE | Veljko Batrović (to (Serbia) Radnički Niš) |
| 15 | MF | BUL | Aleksandar Georgiev (loan return to CSKA Sofia) |
| 16 | DF | BUL | Plamen Galabov (loan return to CSKA Sofia) |
| 17 | MF | GAM | Alasana Manneh (loan return to (Spain) Barcelona B) |
| 21 | DF | BUL | Ventsislav Vasilev (to Arda) |
| 30 | MF | BUL | Iliya Dzhamov (released) |
| 92 | MF | BUL | Erik Pochanski (to Neftochimic) |
| — | MF | BUL | Yordan Apostolov (to Hebar) |

=== Levski Sofia ===
In:

| No. | Pos. | Nation | Player |
|---|---|---|---|
| 1 | GK | MNE | Milan Mijatović (from (Montenegro) Budućnost) |
| 6 | MF | BUL | Ivaylo Naydenov (loan return from Arda) |
| 9 | FW | AUT | Deni Alar (on loan from (Austria) Rapid Wien) |
| 10 | MF | ARG | Franco Mazurek (from (Greece) Panetolikos) |
| 11 | MF | BUL | Zdravko Dimitrov (from Septemvri Sofia) |
| 14 | MF | POR | Filipe Nascimento (loan return from (Romania) Politehnica Iași) |
| 17 | FW | CUW | Nigel Robertha (from (Netherlands) Cambuur) |
| 18 | MF | GHA | Nasiru Mohammed (from (Sweden) BK Häcken) |
| 19 | DF | GRE | Giannis Kargas (from (Greece) PAS Giannina) |
| 21 | MF | BUL | Asen Chandarov (on loan from Septemvri Sofia) |
| — | FW | BUL | Iliya Dimitrov (loan return from Septemvri Sofia) |

Out:

| No. | Pos. | Nation | Player |
|---|---|---|---|
| 2 | DF | FRA | Louis Nganioni (to (Denmark) Fremad Amager) |
| 8 | MF | SUI | Davide Mariani (to (United Arab Emirates) Shabab Al-Ahli) |
| 9 | FW | ROU | Sergiu Buș (to (Romania) Gaz Metan Mediaș) |
| 10 | FW | BRA | Rivaldinho (to (Romania) Viitorul, previously on loan) |
| 11 | MF | FRA | Anthony Belmonte (to (France) Grenoble Foot 38) |
| 14 | MF | EST | Bogdan Vaštšuk (loan return to (Latvia) Riga FC) |
| 17 | FW | KAZ | Yerkebulan Seydakhmet (loan return to (Russia) Ufa) |
| 18 | DF | BEN | Cédric Hountondji (to (France) Clermont Foot) |
| 19 | DF | SRB | Miloš Cvetković (end of contract) |
| 24 | DF | BUL | Tomislav Papazov (on loan to Hebar) |
| 26 | MF | CPV | Jerson Cabral (to (Cyprus) Pafos) |
| 28 | DF | CZE | David Jablonský (to (Poland) Cracovia) |
| 39 | DF | BUL | Deyan Ivanov (on loan to Botev Vratsa) |
| 71 | MF | BUL | Martin P. Petkov (on loan to Lokomotiv GO) |
| 75 | MF | BUL | Aleks Borimirov (released, previously on loan at Slavia Sofia) |
| 86 | FW | BUL | Valeri Bojinov (to Botev Vratsa) |
| 89 | GK | BUL | Nikolay Krastev (released) |
| 93 | MF | BUL | Atanas Kabov (on loan to Vitosha Bistritsa, previously on loan at Tsarsko Selo) |
| 96 | FW | BRA | Luan Viana (end of contract, previously on loan at Tsarsko Selo) |
| — | GK | BUL | Aleksandar Lyubenov (to Hebar, previously on loan at Lokomotiv Sofia) |
| — | FW | BUL | Iliya Dimitrov (on loan to Vitosha Bistritsa) |

=== Lokomotiv Plovdiv ===
In:

| No. | Pos. | Nation | Player |
|---|---|---|---|
| 5 | DF | MOZ | David Malembana (from (Germany) Berliner FC Dynamo) |
| 21 | MF | BUL | Georgi Iliev (from Cherno More) |
| 34 | MF | BUL | Petar Vitanov (from Cherno More) |
| 44 | DF | BUL | Nikolay Nikolaev (from Dobrudzha) |
| 61 | DF | POR | Dinis Almeida (from (France) Monaco) |
| — | DF | BUL | Arhan Isuf (loan return from Arda) |

Out:

| No. | Pos. | Nation | Player |
|---|---|---|---|
| 5 | DF | BUL | Asen Georgiev (to Hebar) |
| 15 | DF | BUL | Dimitar Vezalov (to Hebar) |
| 17 | FW | BUL | Oktay Yusein (on loan to Strumska Slava) |
| 28 | GK | BUL | Pavlin Evtimov (on loan to Strumska Slava) |
| 29 | MF | BUL | Yanko Angelov (to Hebar) |
| 34 | MF | CRO | Igor Banović (to (Belarus) Isloch) |
| 44 | MF | CRO | Vilim Posinković (to (Bosnia and Herzegovina) Radnik Bijeljina) |
| 61 | MF | BRA | Eliton Junior (released) |
| 88 | FW | CRO | Nikola Marić (released) |
| 91 | MF | BEL | Abdelhakim Bouhna (end of contract) |
| — | DF | BUL | Arhan Isuf (on loan to Spartak Varna) |
| — | MF | BUL | Dimitar Zakonov (to Pomorie, previously on loan at Arda) |

=== Ludogorets ===
In:

| No. | Pos. | Nation | Player |
|---|---|---|---|
| 6 | DF | ISR | Taleb Tawatha (from (Germany) Eintracht Frankfurt) |
| 8 | MF | ISR | Dan Biton (from (Israel) Ashdod) |
| 13 | MF | CGO | Mavis Tchibota (from (Israel) Bnei Yehuda) |
| 17 | MF | GNB | Jorginho (from (France) Saint-Étienne) |
| 22 | DF | COD | Jordan Ikoko (from (France) Guingamp) |
| 25 | MF | SEN | Stéphane Badji (from (Turkey) Bursaspor) |

Out:

| No. | Pos. | Nation | Player |
|---|---|---|---|
| 6 | DF | BRA | Natanael (to (Brazil) Internacional) |
| 8 | MF | BRA | Lucas Sasha (to (Greece) Aris) |
| 20 | MF | BUL | Serkan Yusein (on loan to Tsarsko Selo) |
| 63 | MF | BRA | David Ribeiro (on loan to Botev Vratsa) |
| 64 | MF | BUL | Dominik Yankov (on loan to Botev Vratsa) |
| 72 | MF | BUL | Erol Dost (on loan to Etar) |
| 77 | MF | ROU | Adrian Popa (loan return to (England) Reading) |
| 98 | MF | BUL | Svetoslav Kovachev (on loan to Etar, previously on loan at Dunav) |
| — | DF | BUL | Ventsislav Kerchev (to Botev Vratsa, previously on loan) |
| — | FW | BRA | Júnior Brandão (on loan to (Iran) Persepolis, previously on loan at (Brazil) Goiás) |

=== Slavia Sofia ===
In:

| No. | Pos. | Nation | Player |
|---|---|---|---|
| 4 | DF | BUL | Petar Patev (from Dunav) |
| 5 | MF | BUL | Nikolay Dyulgerov (from (North Macedonia) Rabotnički) |
| 7 | FW | BUL | Kaloyan Krastev (on loan from (Italy) Bologna) |
| 15 | DF | BUL | Emil Viyachki (from (North Macedonia) Rabotnički) |
| 16 | DF | BUL | Martin Achkov (from Litex) |
| 27 | DF | CRO | Nediljko Kovačević (from (Slovakia) Tatran Prešov) |
| 33 | MF | BUL | Galin Ivanov (from (Hungary) Haladás) |
| 55 | DF | BUL | Andrea Hristov (loan return from (Italy) Cosenza) |
| 71 | MF | BUL | Emil Stoev (loan return from Botev Vratsa) |
| 73 | MF | BUL | Ventsislav Bengyuzov (from Arda) |
| 83 | DF | BUL | Hristo Popadiyn (from Dunav) |

Out:

| No. | Pos. | Nation | Player |
|---|---|---|---|
| 3 | DF | BUL | Teynur Marem (released) |
| 12 | GK | ITA | Emanuele Geria (to (Italy) Reggina) |
| 15 | DF | SRB | Aleksandar Stanisavljević (released) |
| 16 | DF | SRB | Dušan Lalatović (released) |
| 17 | DF | KOR | Kim Ho-yeon (on loan to Spartak Varna) |
| 18 | MF | SRB | Luka Spoljarić (released) |
| 24 | DF | BUL | Preslav Petrov (to Montana) |
| 27 | DF | NED | Randy Onuoha (to (Netherlands) VVOG) |
| 37 | MF | MKD | Stefan Aškovski (to (Romania) Botoșani) |
| 75 | MF | BUL | Aleks Borimirov (loan return to Levski Sofia) |
| 77 | MF | CRO | Denny Valentić-Bara (released) |
| — | DF | BUL | Dimitar Burov (to Strumska Slava, previously on loan at CSKA 1948) |
| — | MF | BUL | Toni Ivanov (on loan to CSKA 1948, previously on loan at Lokomotiv GO) |
| — | MF | BUL | Vladimir Semerdzhiev (to Lokomotiv Sofia, previously on loan at Tsarsko Selo) |
| — | MF | BUL | Kitan Vasilev (to Lokomotiv Sofia, previously on loan at Tsarsko Selo) |
| — | MF | BUL | Kristiyan Peshov (to CSKA 1948, previously on loan) |

=== Tsarsko Selo ===
In:

| No. | Pos. | Nation | Player |
|---|---|---|---|
| 2 | DF | BRA | Gustavo Carbonieri (from (Brazil) Atibaia) |
| 3 | DF | BUL | Martin Kavdanski (from Botev Vratsa) |
| 7 | MF | BUL | Anton Karachanakov (from Botev Plovdiv) |
| 8 | MF | BRA | Wesley Natã (from (Brazil) Chapecoense) |
| 11 | MF | NED | Rodney Antwi (from (Netherlands) Volendam) |
| 20 | MF | BUL | Serkan Yusein (on loan from Ludogorets) |
| 22 | MF | CGO | Dylan Bahamboula (from (Algeria) CS Constantine) |
| 30 | GK | HAI | Johny Placide (free agent) |
| 89 | MF | FRA | Damien Marie (from (Slovakia) Inter Bratislava) |
| 91 | FW | BUL | Ventsislav Hristov (from Arda) |
| 93 | FW | BRA | Anderson (from (Brazil) Taubaté) |
| — | DF | BRA | Charles (from (Brazil) Flamengo Arcoverde) |
| — | GK | BUL | Ivan Čvorović (from Botev Plovdiv) |
| — | MF | BUL | Sergey Georgiev (from Montana) |
| — | MF | BRA | Everton Dias (from (Brazil) Luverdense) |
| — | FW | BUL | Svetoslav Dikov (from (Slovenia) Tabor Sežana) |

Out:

| No. | Pos. | Nation | Player |
|---|---|---|---|
| 4 | DF | BUL | Plamen Tenev (to Neftochimic) |
| 7 | MF | BUL | Borislav Baldzhiyski (to Montana) |
| 8 | FW | BUL | Georgi Andonov (to Hebar) |
| 9 | FW | BRA | Luan Viana (loan return to Levski Sofia) |
| 11 | MF | BUL | Kitan Vasilev (loan return to Slavia Sofia) |
| 12 | GK | BUL | Rosen Andonov (to Neftochimic) |
| 13 | DF | BUL | Galin Minkov (to Litex) |
| 22 | MF | BUL | Vladimir Semerdzhiev (loan return to Slavia Sofia) |
| 89 | MF | BUL | Iliyan Yordanov (released) |
| 93 | MF | BUL | Atanas Kabov (loan return to Levski Sofia) |
| — | GK | BUL | Ivan Čvorović (released) |
| — | MF | BUL | Sergey Georgiev (to Montana) |
| — | MF | BRA | Everton Dias (released) |
| — | FW | BUL | Svetoslav Dikov (to Lokomotiv Sofia) |

=== Vitosha Bistritsa ===
In:

| No. | Pos. | Nation | Player |
|---|---|---|---|
| 3 | DF | BUL | Evgeni Zyumbulev (from Lokomotiv Sofia) |
| 9 | FW | BUL | Iliya Dimitrov (on loan from Levski Sofia) |
| 17 | MF | BUL | Zapro Dinev (from Botev Plovdiv) |
| 18 | DF | GRE | Theofilos Kouroupis (from Vereya) |
| 22 | DF | BUL | Aleksandar Hristev (from Atletik Kuklen) |
| 33 | GK | BUL | Kristiyan Katsarev (from Vereya) |
| 66 | FW | COL | Andrés Sánchez (free agent) |
| 77 | MF | MLI | Mohamed Sylla (free agent) |
| 88 | MF | BUL | Martin Stankev (from Dunav) |
| 93 | MF | BUL | Atanas Kabov (on loan from Levski Sofia) |
| 96 | MF | BUL | Hristo Ivanov (from Cherno More U19) |
| 99 | DF | BUL | Vanyo Ivanov (from Montana U19) |

Out:

| No. | Pos. | Nation | Player |
|---|---|---|---|
| 9 | MF | BUL | Angel Stoyanov (released) |
| 16 | DF | BUL | Radko Mutafchiyski (released) |
| 17 | MF | BUL | Mihail Petrov (to Sportist Svoge) |
| 18 | MF | BUL | Petko Tsankov (to Beroe) |
| 22 | DF | BUL | Mihail Milchev (to Dunav) |
| 33 | GK | BUL | Nikolay Radev (to Sportist Svoge) |
| 77 | MF | BUL | Ivan Valchanov (to Pirin Blagoevgrad) |
| 88 | MF | BUL | Ivaylo Lazarov (to Dunav) |
| 94 | DF | BUL | Yuliyan Popev (to Septemvri Sofia) |
| 96 | FW | BUL | Nasko Milev (to Lokomotiv Sofia) |
| 99 | FW | BUL | Stefan Hristov (to Dunav) |

== Second League ==
=== Botev Galabovo ===
In:

| No. | Pos. | Nation | Player |
|---|---|---|---|
| 1 | GK | BUL | Diyan Valkov (from CSKA 1948) |
| 3 | MF | BUL | Anton Ognyanov (from Botev Vratsa) |
| 8 | MF | BUL | Dimitar Traykov (from Minyor Radnevo) |
| 14 | MF | BUL | Valchan Chanev (from Arda) |
| 15 | DF | BUL | Emin Ahmed (from Lokomotiv GO) |
| 19 | MF | BUL | Dimitar Atanasov (on loan from Arda) |
| 21 | MF | BUL | Mitko Plahov (from Arda) |
| 39 | FW | BUL | Dimitar Aleksiev (from Arda) |
| 92 | FW | BUL | Eray Karadayi (on loan from Arda) |
| 98 | MF | BUL | Berkay Halil (from Nesebar) |

Out:

| No. | Pos. | Nation | Player |
|---|---|---|---|
| 1 | GK | BUL | Plamen Kolev (to Beroe) |
| 8 | MF | BUL | Milen Mitev (to Zagorets) |
| 9 | FW | BUL | Metodi Kostov (to Vihren) |
| 19 | FW | BUL | Rangel Abushev (to Spartak Varna) |
| 39 | MF | BUL | Rangel Ignatov (to Oborishte) |
| 74 | DF | BUL | Krasimir Zdravkov (released) |
| 85 | GK | BUL | Miroslav Radev (released) |
| 92 | MF | BUL | Ivan Toshev (to Minyor Radnevo) |
| 96 | GK | BUL | Pavel Kolev (released) |
| 98 | MF | BUL | Georgi Tartov (to Kariana) |
| 99 | FW | BUL | Gabriel Dimanov (to Zagorets) |

=== Chernomorets Balchik ===
In:

| No. | Pos. | Nation | Player |
|---|---|---|---|
| 2 | DF | BUL | Todor Taushanov (from Pomorie) |
| 3 | DF | BUL | Daniel Georgiev (from Montana) |
| 6 | MF | BUL | Aleksandar Stefanov (from Cherno More U19) |
| 7 | MF | BUL | Aleksandar Popov (from Lokomotiv GO) |
| 18 | MF | BUL | Ivan Mihaylov (from Nesebar) |
| 33 | FW | BUL | Vasil Kaloyanov (from Chernomorets Burgas) |
| 77 | FW | BUL | Georgi Stoyanov (from Ludogorets II) |

Out:

| No. | Pos. | Nation | Player |
|---|---|---|---|
| 2 | DF | BUL | Valeri Hristov (to Montana) |
| 3 | DF | BUL | Nikolay Georgiev (to Svilengrad) |
| 4 | DF | BUL | Daniel Gramatikov (to Ustrem Donchevo) |
| 7 | FW | BUL | Valentin Yoskov (loan return to Cherno More) |
| 9 | FW | BUL | Yanaki Smirnov (to Pomorie) |
| 18 | MF | BUL | Rumen Kasabov (loan return to Cherno More) |

=== CSKA 1948 ===
In:

| No. | Pos. | Nation | Player |
|---|---|---|---|
| 7 | MF | BUL | Boris Tyutyukov (from Pomorie) |
| 8 | MF | BUL | Ivaylo Klimentov (from Ludogorets II) |
| 9 | MF | BUL | Kristiyan Peshov (from Slavia Sofia, previously on loan) |
| 10 | MF | BUL | Vasil Shopov (from Botev Plovdiv) |
| 13 | DF | BUL | Kristian Nikolov (from Slivnishki Geroy) |
| 19 | MF | BUL | Mihael Orachev (from Pomorie) |
| 21 | DF | BUL | Ventsislav Vasilev (from Arda) |
| 27 | MF | BUL | Milko Georgiev (from Botev Plovdiv) |
| 29 | GK | BUL | Daniel Naumov (from Ludogorets II) |
| 71 | MF | BUL | Toni Ivanov (on loan from Slavia Sofia) |
| 88 | DF | BUL | Steven Kirilov (from Minyor Pernik) |
| 98 | FW | BUL | Valentin Yoskov (from Cherno More) |
| — | FW | BUL | Martin Toshev (from (Lebanon) Al Ahed) |

Out:

| No. | Pos. | Nation | Player |
|---|---|---|---|
| 1 | GK | BUL | Diyan Valkov (to Botev Galabovo) |
| 5 | DF | BUL | Petar Genchev (loan return to Septemvri Sofia) |
| 7 | MF | BUL | Radoy Bozhilov (to Nadezhda Dobroslavtsi) |
| 8 | MF | BUL | Spas Georgiev (to Septemvri Sofia) |
| 10 | MF | BUL | Aykut Ramadan (to Lokomotiv GO) |
| 14 | DF | BUL | Toni Stoichkov (to Minyor Pernik) |
| 18 | DF | BUL | Apostol Popov (to Botev Vratsa) |
| 21 | MF | BUL | Mariyan Ognyanov (to (Germany) Hansa Friesoythe) |
| 31 | DF | BUL | Dimitar Burov (loan return to Slavia Sofia) |
| 70 | GK | BUL | Michael Matev (to Nadezhda Dobroslavtsi) |
| — | FW | BUL | Martin Toshev (to (Kazakhstan) Zhetysu) |

=== Hebar ===
In:

| No. | Pos. | Nation | Player |
|---|---|---|---|
| 4 | DF | BUL | Asen Georgiev (from Lokomotiv Plovdiv) |
| 7 | FW | BUL | Georgi Andonov (from Tsarsko Selo) |
| 10 | MF | BUL | Veselin Marchev (from Arda) |
| 15 | DF | BUL | Dimitar Vezalov (from Lokomotiv Plovdiv) |
| 19 | MF | BUL | Georgi Karakashev (from Pirin Razlog) |
| 26 | MF | BUL | Martin Valchinov (from Balkan Botevgrad) |
| 29 | MF | BUL | Yanko Angelov (from Lokomotiv Plovdiv) |
| 30 | MF | BUL | Bozhidar Vasev (from Dunav) |
| 45 | MF | BUL | Vladimir Gadzhev (from Beroe) |
| 77 | FW | BUL | Oktay Hamdiev (from Septemvri Sofia) |
| 88 | MF | BUL | Yordan Apostolov (from Etar) |
| 91 | DF | BUL | Tomislav Papazov (on loan from Levski Sofia) |
| 95 | GK | BUL | Aleksandar Lyubenov (from Levski Sofia) |
| 99 | FW | BUL | Todor Chavorski (from Lokomotiv Sofia) |

Out:

| No. | Pos. | Nation | Player |
|---|---|---|---|
| 6 | DF | BUL | Nikolay Stoilkov (to Oborishte) |
| 7 | MF | BUL | Ruslan Ivanov (to Pirin Blagoevgrad) |
| 10 | MF | BUL | Kiril Georgiev (released) |
| 18 | MF | BUL | Yakub Idrizov (to Pomorie) |
| 21 | FW | BRA | Rodrigo Baroni (released) |
| 22 | DF | BUL | Martin Sechkov (retired) |
| 23 | DF | BUL | Tsvetan Pavlov (retired) |
| 39 | DF | BUL | Kristiyan Mihaylov (released) |
| 42 | DF | BUL | Simeon Ivanov (to Sportist Svoge) |
| 74 | GK | BUL | Dimitar Pangev (to Pirin Blagoevgrad) |

=== Kariana ===
In:

| No. | Pos. | Nation | Player |
|---|---|---|---|
| 4 | DF | BUL | Martin Nikolov (from Lokomotiv GO) |
| 9 | FW | BUL | Redzheb Halil (from Nesebar) |
| 16 | MF | BUL | Simeon Rusev (from Nesebar) |
| 77 | MF | BUL | Georgi Chakarov (from (Greece) Chalkida) |
| 97 | MF | BUL | Georgi Tartov (from Botev Galabovo) |

Out:

| No. | Pos. | Nation | Player |
|---|---|---|---|
| 4 | DF | BUL | Tsvetko Ivanov (to Kom Berkovitsa) |
| 16 | MF | BUL | Nikolay Nikolov (released) |
| 19 | DF | BUL | Ivan Todorov (to Kom Berkovitsa) |
| 77 | MF | BUL | Krasimir Iliev (to Haskovo) |
| 93 | MF | BUL | Yanislav Ivanov (to Spartak Pleven) |
| 97 | FW | BUL | Lionel Matados (to Strumska Slava) |
| 99 | FW | BUL | Dimitar Georgiev (loan return to Montana) |

=== Litex ===
In:

| No. | Pos. | Nation | Player |
|---|---|---|---|
| 11 | DF | BUL | Galin Minkov (from Tsarsko Selo) |
| 18 | MF | BUL | Adrian Girginov (from CSKA Sofia U19) |
| 20 | DF | BUL | Giulio Charlov (from CSKA Sofia U19) |
| 34 | MF | BUL | Oleg Dimitrov (from Ludogorets II) |
| 97 | FW | BUL | Aleksandar Asparuhov (from Strumska Slava) |
| — | GK | BUL | Boris Gruev (from CSKA Sofia U19) |

Out:

| No. | Pos. | Nation | Player |
|---|---|---|---|
| 11 | DF | BUL | Martin Achkov (to Slavia Sofia) |
| 77 | FW | BUL | Kristiyan Tafradzhiyski (released) |
| 88 | MF | BUL | Mitko Mitkov (loan return to CSKA Sofia) |
| — | GK | BUL | Boris Gruev (to Chavdar Etropole) |

=== Lokomotiv GO ===
In:

| No. | Pos. | Nation | Player |
|---|---|---|---|
| 7 | MF | BUL | Kristiyan Raychev (from Pavlikeni) |
| 9 | FW | BUL | Kaloyan Stefanov (from Sportist Svoge) |
| 10 | MF | BUL | Aykut Ramadan (from CSKA 1948) |
| 14 | GK | BUL | Stefan Dafovski (free agent) |
| 17 | MF | BUL | Martin P. Petkov (on loan from Levski Sofia) |
| 18 | FW | BUL | Deyan Hristov (from Neftochimic) |
| 25 | MF | BUL | Georgi Yanev (from Strumska Slava) |
| 33 | GK | BUL | Ivaylo Vasilev (from Septemvri Sofia) |
| 96 | MF | BUL | Georgi Kolev (from Spartak Varna) |
| — | DF | BUL | Emin Ahmed (from Beroe) |
| — | MF | BUL | Sava Savov (from Nesebar) |
| — | MF | BUL | Aykut Yanukov (from Maritsa Plovdiv) |
| — | FW | BUL | Eray Karadayi (on loan from Arda) |

Out:

| No. | Pos. | Nation | Player |
|---|---|---|---|
| 2 | DF | BUL | Martin Nikolov (to Kariana) |
| 7 | MF | BUL | Toni Ivanov (loan return to Slavia Sofia) |
| 9 | FW | BUL | Ivan Kolev (to Neftochimic) |
| 10 | MF | BUL | Aleksandar Popov (to Chernomorets Balchik) |
| 11 | MF | BUL | Krasen Trifonov (to Pavlikeni) |
| 14 | GK | BUL | Evgeni Aleksandrov (released) |
| 15 | FW | BUL | Maksimilian Velkov (to Sevlievo) |
| 24 | MF | BUL | Aleksandar Zlatkov (loan return to Slavia Sofia) |
| 25 | MF | BUL | Yordan Petev (to Pavlikeni) |
| 27 | MF | BUL | Filip Angelov (released) |
| 31 | GK | BUL | Hristian Slavov (to Spartak Varna) |
| 83 | DF | BUL | Ivan Penev (to Spartak Varna) |
| — | DF | BUL | Emin Ahmed (to Botev Galabovo) |
| — | MF | BUL | Sava Savov (released) |
| — | MF | BUL | Aykut Yanukov (released) |
| — | FW | BUL | Eray Karadayi (loan return to Arda) |

=== Lokomotiv Sofia ===
In:

| No. | Pos. | Nation | Player |
|---|---|---|---|
| 2 | DF | BRA | Pedro Ferrari (from (Belgium) Olympia Wijgmaal) |
| 4 | DF | BUL | Miki Orachev (from (Germany) Holzwickeder SC) |
| 8 | FW | BUL | Nasko Milev (from Vitosha Bistritsa) |
| 9 | FW | BUL | Dimitar Georgiev (from Montana) |
| 11 | MF | BUL | Kitan Vasilev (from Slavia Sofia) |
| 12 | DF | BRA | Choco (from (Brazil) Ituano) |
| 15 | DF | SRB | Nemanja Ivanov (from (Slovenia) Drava Ptuj) |
| 18 | FW | BUL | Svetoslav Dikov (from Tsarsko Selo) |
| 22 | MF | BUL | Vladimir Semerdzhiev (from Slavia Sofia) |
| 30 | MF | BUL | Todor Trayanov (from (Poland) KKS Kalisz) |
| 33 | MF | BRA | Tom (from (Brazil) Batatais) |
| 39 | DF | SRB | Saša Domić (from (Slovenia) Brežice 1919) |
| 91 | GK | BUL | Ivaylo Vasilev (from Montana) |

Out:

| No. | Pos. | Nation | Player |
|---|---|---|---|
| 4 | DF | BUL | Mario Blagoev (released) |
| 5 | DF | BUL | Georgi Punev (released) |
| 8 | MF | ALG | Ismaël Taïder (released) |
| 9 | FW | BUL | Todor Chavorski (to Hebar) |
| 11 | MF | BUL | Vladislav Romanov (released) |
| 15 | DF | BUL | Aleksandar Goranov (released) |
| 16 | DF | BUL | Ivan Kalaydzhiyski (to Montana) |
| 17 | MF | BUL | Yordan Todorov (loan return to Septemvri Sofia) |
| 19 | MF | BUL | Mario Yordanov (to Rilski Sportist) |
| 20 | MF | BUL | Dzhihat Kyamil (to Pavlikeni) |
| 21 | DF | GRE | Christos Kontochristos (to Pirin Blagoevgrad) |
| 24 | GK | BUL | Aleksandar Lyubenov (loan return to Levski Sofia) |
| 27 | FW | BUL | Andrey Videnov (released) |
| 88 | DF | BUL | Evgeni Zyumbulev (to Vitosha Bistritsa) |
| 94 | MF | BUL | Ani Petkov (released) |

=== Ludogorets II ===
In:

| No. | Pos. | Nation | Player |
|---|---|---|---|
| 34 | MF | BUL | Branimir Kostadinov (free agent) |
| 75 | DF | BUL | Petar Genchev (from Septemvri Sofia) |

Out:

| No. | Pos. | Nation | Player |
|---|---|---|---|
| 29 | GK | BUL | Daniel Naumov (to CSKA 1948) |
| 34 | MF | BUL | Oleg Dimitrov (to Litex) |
| 38 | FW | BUL | Georgi Stoyanov (to Chernomorets Balchik) |
| 45 | MF | BUL | Ivaylo Klimentov (to CSKA 1948) |
| 62 | DF | BUL | Nikolay Tomov (to Spartak Varna) |

=== Montana ===
In:

| No. | Pos. | Nation | Player |
|---|---|---|---|
| 2 | DF | BUL | Valeri Hristov (from Chernomorets Balchik) |
| 5 | DF | BUL | Kostadin Gadzhalov (from Botev Vratsa) |
| 6 | DF | BUL | Ivan Kalaydzhiyski (from Lokomotiv Sofia) |
| 11 | MF | BUL | Nikolay Minkov (from Dobrudzha) |
| 21 | MF | BUL | Borislav Baldzhiyski (from Tsarsko Selo) |
| 23 | MF | BUL | Sergey Georgiev (from Tsarsko Selo) |
| 24 | DF | BUL | Preslav Petrov (from Slavia Sofia) |
| 55 | GK | BUL | Vasil Simeonov (from Pirin Razlog) |

Out:

| No. | Pos. | Nation | Player |
|---|---|---|---|
| 2 | DF | BUL | Vasil Popov (to Septemvri Sofia) |
| 14 | MF | BUL | Nikola Gavov (loan return to Beroe) |
| 15 | DF | BUL | Rumen Trifonov (to Pirin Blagoevgrad) |
| 22 | MF | BUL | Sergey Georgiev (to Tsarsko Selo) |
| 23 | DF | BUL | Daniel Georgiev (to Chernomorets Balchik) |
| 25 | DF | BUL | Borislav Stoychev (to Sportist Svoge) |
| 33 | GK | BUL | Ivaylo Vasilev (to Lokomotiv Sofia) |
| — | FW | BUL | Dimitar Georgiev (to Lokomotiv Sofia, previously on loan at Kariana) |

=== Neftochimic ===
In:

| No. | Pos. | Nation | Player |
|---|---|---|---|
| 1 | GK | BUL | Pavel Zdravkov (from Nesebar) |
| 2 | DF | BUL | Dzhuneyt Ali (from Nesebar) |
| 4 | DF | BUL | Plamen Tenev (from Tsarsko Selo) |
| 7 | MF | BUL | Galin Dimov (from Nesebar) |
| 9 | FW | BUL | Ivan Kolev (from Lokomotiv GO) |
| 14 | FW | BUL | Zhivko Petkov (from Pomorie) |
| 20 | FW | BUL | Ivan Tsachev (from Nesebar) |
| 23 | DF | BUL | Diyan Moldovanov (from Nesebar) |
| 33 | GK | BUL | Rosen Andonov (from Tsarsko Selo) |
| 66 | MF | BUL | Radoslav Apostolov (from Botev Plovdiv) |
| 77 | MF | BUL | Dimitar Kostadinov (from Septemvri Sofia) |
| 92 | MF | BUL | Erik Pochanski (from Etar) |

Out:

| No. | Pos. | Nation | Player |
|---|---|---|---|
| 1 | GK | BUL | Ferdi Myumyunov (to Vihren) |
| 5 | DF | BUL | Georgi Radev (to Spartak Varna) |
| 7 | MF | BUL | Stoyko Ivanov (to Chernomorets Burgas) |
| 8 | MF | BUL | Lyubomir Bozhinov (to Chernomorets Burgas) |
| 17 | FW | BUL | Kolyo Chahov (to Rilski Sportist) |
| 18 | FW | BUL | Deyan Hristov (to Lokomotiv GO) |
| 20 | DF | BUL | Stoyan Kalev (to Karnobat) |
| 23 | DF | BUL | Stanislav Zhekov (to Nesebar) |
| 25 | MF | BUL | Daniel Stoyanov (released) |
| 71 | DF | BUL | Ventsislav Slavov (to Chernomorets Burgas) |
| 96 | GK | BUL | Martin Sheytanov (to Pomorie) |

=== Pirin Blagoevgrad ===
In:

| No. | Pos. | Nation | Player |
|---|---|---|---|
| 2 | DF | FRA | Bila Antonio (from (France) Aix-les-Bains) |
| 7 | MF | BUL | Ruslan Ivanov (from Hebar) |
| 8 | FW | CIV | Bradley Meledje (free agent) |
| 10 | MF | BUL | Ivan Valchanov (from Vitosha Bistritsa) |
| 11 | FW | BRA | Gabriel Pereira (from (Portugal) Académico Viseu) |
| 18 | MF | BUL | Martin Dinov (from Sokol Markovo) |
| 20 | MF | FRA | Gloire Antonio (free agent) |
| 21 | DF | BUL | Rumen Trifonov (from Montana) |
| 22 | GK | BUL | Dimitar Pangev (from Hebar) |
| 29 | DF | GRE | Christos Kontochristos (from Lokomotiv Sofia) |
| 30 | FW | MKD | Marjan Altiparmakovski (free agent) |
| 41 | DF | BUL | Pavel Vidanov (from (Lithuania) Atlantas) |
| 44 | MF | IRL | Conor Henderson (from (Romania) Dunărea Călărași) |
| 87 | GK | BUL | Veselin Ganev (from Arda) |

Out:

| No. | Pos. | Nation | Player |
|---|---|---|---|
| 6 | DF | AUS | Kristopher Kioussis (loan return to Dunav) |
| 7 | DF | BUL | Veselin Lyubomirov (to Marek) |
| 8 | MF | BUL | Anton Kostadinov (to Spartak Varna) |
| 10 | MF | BUL | Nikola Georgiev (to Vihren) |
| 11 | MF | BUL | Kiril Mutavdzhiyski (to Bansko) |
| 14 | MF | BUL | Kiril Grozdanov (released) |
| 21 | FW | BUL | Viktor Yanev (to Chernomorets Burgas) |
| 22 | GK | BUL | Filip Dimitrov (loan return to Dunav) |
| 23 | MF | COL | Juan Pablo González (released) |
| 29 | DF | BUL | Milen Stoev (loan return to Arda) |

=== Pomorie ===
In:

| No. | Pos. | Nation | Player |
|---|---|---|---|
| 1 | GK | BUL | Martin Sheytanov (from Neftochimic) |
| 3 | DF | BUL | Todor Petkov (from Botev Plovdiv U19) |
| 7 | MF | BUL | Dimitar Zakonov (from Lokomotiv Plovdiv) |
| 16 | MF | FRA | Wilfried Grimaud (from Sozopol) |
| 17 | MF | BUL | Georgi Chukalov (from Arda) |
| 19 | MF | BUL | Yakub Idrizov (from Hebar) |
| 20 | MF | BUL | Rumen Kasabov (from Cherno More) |
| 21 | MF | BUL | Hristo Lemperov (from Chernomorets Burgas) |
| 24 | MF | FRA | Josué Ntoya (from Vereya) |
| 27 | FW | BUL | Tihomir Kanev (from (Greece) Kronos Argyrades) |
| — | FW | BUL | Yanaki Smirnov (from Chernomorets Balchik) |

Out:

| No. | Pos. | Nation | Player |
|---|---|---|---|
| 3 | DF | BUL | Todor Taushanov (to Chernomorets Balchik) |
| 7 | MF | BUL | Boris Tyutyukov (to CSKA 1948) |
| 17 | MF | BUL | Kristiyan Hristov (released) |
| 18 | FW | BUL | Zhivko Petkov (to Neftochimic) |
| 19 | MF | BUL | Mihael Orachev (to CSKA 1948) |
| 20 | MF | BUL | Vasil Bozhinov (to Belasitsa Petrich) |
| 21 | MF | BUL | Teodor Stefanov (to Sozopol) |
| 30 | GK | BUL | Martin Temenliev (to Chernomorets Burgas) |
| — | FW | BUL | Yanaki Smirnov (to Spartak Varna) |

=== Septemvri Sofia ===
In:

| No. | Pos. | Nation | Player |
|---|---|---|---|
| 3 | DF | BUL | Rumen Sandev (from Arda) |
| 6 | DF | BUL | Yuliyan Popev (from Vitosha Bistritsa) |
| 12 | GK | BUL | Filip Dimitrov (from Dunav) |
| 14 | MF | BUL | Pavel Petkov (free agent) |
| 17 | MF | BUL | Spas Georgiev (from CSKA 1948) |
| 23 | DF | BUL | Vasil Popov (from Montana) |
| 24 | MF | BUL | Stefan Gavrilov (free agent) |
| 26 | DF | BUL | Mariyan Ivanov (from Botev Vratsa) |

Out:

| No. | Pos. | Nation | Player |
|---|---|---|---|
| 4 | DF | BUL | Ivan Arsov (to Pirin Razlog) |
| 5 | FW | BUL | Oktay Hamdiev (to Hebar) |
| 6 | DF | ROU | Alexandru Benga (to (Romania) Chindia Târgoviște) |
| 9 | FW | BUL | Iliya Dimitrov (loan return to Levski Sofia) |
| 10 | MF | BUL | Asen Chandarov (on loan to Levski Sofia) |
| 13 | MF | BUL | Zdravko Dimitrov (to Levski Sofia) |
| 15 | DF | BUL | Mateo Stamatov (released) |
| 17 | MF | BUL | Dimitar Kostadinov (to Neftochimic) |
| 19 | DF | MKD | Darko Glišić (to Arda) |
| 20 | FW | GER | Christopher Mandiangu (to (Poland) Widzew Łódź) |
| 21 | GK | BUL | Yanko Georgiev (to Botev Plovdiv) |
| 23 | DF | BUL | Aleksandar Dyulgerov (to Etar) |
| 24 | MF | KOS | Suad Sahiti (to (Poland) Wisła Płock) |
| 26 | MF | BRA | Fabiano Alves (to (Switzerland) St. Gallen) |
| — | DF | BUL | Petar Genchev (to Ludogorets II, previously on loan at CSKA 1948) |
| — | DF | BUL | Vasil Dobrev (on loan to Spartak Varna, previously on loan at Arda) |
| — | MF | BUL | Yordan Todorov (to Rilski Sportist, previously on loan at Lokomotiv Sofia) |

=== Spartak Pleven ===
In:

| No. | Pos. | Nation | Player |
|---|---|---|---|
| 2 | DF | BUL | Yordan Radev (on loan from Cherno More) |
| 5 | DF | BUL | Kristiyan Grigorov (from Dobrudzha) |
| 17 | MF | BUL | Petar Tonchev (from Dobrudzha) |
| 18 | MF | BUL | Giorgio Dimitrov (from Rilski Sportist) |
| 20 | MF | BUL | Hosein Traykov (from Sevlievo) |
| 22 | MF | BUL | Yanislav Ivanov (from Kariana) |
| 31 | FW | BUL | Andriyan Dimitrov (free agent) |
| 77 | MF | BUL | Petar Vutsov (on loan from Cherno More) |
| 86 | GK | BUL | Stanislav Antonov (from Dunav) |

Out:

| No. | Pos. | Nation | Player |
|---|---|---|---|
| — | GK | BUL | Ivan Georgiev (released) |
| — | GK | BUL | Teodor Todorov (to Vihar Slavyanovo) |
| — | DF | BUL | Toni Palikrushev (to Vihar Slavyanovo) |
| — | DF | BUL | Georgi Goranov (to Akademik Svishtov) |
| — | MF | BUL | Tsvetan Petrov (to Vihar Slavyanovo) |
| — | MF | BUL | Tihomir Todorov (released) |
| — | FW | BUL | Aleksandar Aleksandrov (to Partizan Cherven Bryag) |
| — | FW | BUL | Lyubomir Todorov (released) |

=== Spartak Varna ===
In:

| No. | Pos. | Nation | Player |
|---|---|---|---|
| 2 | DF | BUL | Nikolay Tomov (from Ludogorets II) |
| 3 | DF | BUL | Vasil Dobrev (on loan from Septemvri Sofia) |
| 4 | DF | BUL | Ivo Ivanov (from Vereya) |
| 5 | DF | BUL | Georgi Dinkov (from Dunav) |
| 6 | DF | BUL | Arhan Isuf (on loan from Lokomotiv Plovdiv) |
| 7 | FW | BUL | Yanaki Smirnov (from Pomorie) |
| 8 | MF | BUL | Stoyan Ivanov (on loan from Beroe) |
| 11 | MF | BUL | Filip Kolev (on loan from Lokomotiv Plovdiv) |
| 12 | GK | BUL | Hristian Slavov (from Lokomotiv GO) |
| 19 | FW | BUL | Rangel Abushev (from Botev Galabovo) |
| 24 | MF | BUL | Anton Kostadinov (from Pirin Blagoevgrad) |
| 83 | DF | BUL | Ivan Penev (from Lokomotiv GO) |
| — | DF | KOR | Kim Ho-yeon (on loan from Slavia Sofia) |
| — | DF | BUL | Georgi Radev (from Neftochimic) |
| — | MF | NED | Nazario de Fretes (from (Netherlands) NAC Breda) |
| — | MF | BUL | Georgi Kolev (from Dobrudzha) |
| — | MF | BUL | Ivan Kirev (from Pirin Razlog) |

Out:

| No. | Pos. | Nation | Player |
|---|---|---|---|
| 2 | DF | BUL | Blagovest Gachev (to Shumen) |
| 3 | DF | BUL | Sevdalin Staykov (to Svetkavitsa) |
| 5 | MF | BUL | Valentin Veselinov (released) |
| 6 | MF | BUL | Milen Nikolov (to Suvorovo) |
| 9 | FW | BUL | Yulian Zagorov (to Shumen) |
| 11 | MF | BUL | Iliyan Nedelchev (to Topoli) |
| 14 | MF | BUL | Ivo Mihaylov (to Svetkavitsa) |
| 19 | MF | BUL | Todor Marinchev (to Septemvri Tervel) |
| 21 | MF | BUL | Nikolay Pantev (released) |
| 22 | MF | BUL | Beadir Beadirov (to Chernolomets Popovo) |
| 25 | MF | BUL | Martin Kostov (released) |
| 27 | GK | BUL | Kalin Dyankov (to Kaliakra) |
| — | DF | KOR | Kim Ho-yeon (loan return to Slavia Sofia) |
| — | DF | BUL | Georgi Radev (released) |
| — | MF | NED | Nazario de Fretes (released) |
| — | MF | BUL | Georgi Kolev (to Lokomotiv GO) |
| — | MF | BUL | Ivan Kirev (released) |

=== Strumska Slava ===
In:

| No. | Pos. | Nation | Player |
|---|---|---|---|
| 1 | GK | BUL | Slavi Petrov (from CSKA Sofia) |
| 4 | DF | FRA | Simeon Petrov (from (France) Gazélec Ajaccio) |
| 9 | FW | BUL | Lionel Matados (from Kariana) |
| 11 | FW | BUL | Oktay Yusein (on loan from Lokomotiv Plovdiv) |
| 13 | DF | BUL | Dimitar Burov (from Slavia Sofia) |
| 33 | MF | BUL | Bogomil Hristov (from Oborishte) |
| 77 | FW | BUL | Rosen Krastev (from Dobrudzha) |
| — | GK | BUL | Pavlin Evtimov (on loan from Lokomotiv Plovdiv) |
| — | DF | BUL | Agop Kochiyan (from Tsarsko Selo) |

Out:

| No. | Pos. | Nation | Player |
|---|---|---|---|
| 1 | GK | BUL | Ivaylo Krusharski (released) |
| 4 | DF | BUL | Yuliyan Chapaev (to Yambol) |
| 8 | MF | BUL | Todor Zyumbulev (retired) |
| 9 | FW | BUL | Aleksandar Asparuhov (to Litex) |
| 10 | MF | BUL | Erik Ivanov (released) |
| 11 | MF | BUL | Georgi Yanev (to Lokomotiv GO) |
| 33 | MF | BUL | Dinko Dinev (to Yambol) |
| 77 | DF | BUL | Slavi Paskalev (to Partizan Cherven Bryag) |
| 84 | FW | BEL | Maxime Cosse (released) |
| 99 | GK | BUL | Vilislav Michev (to Botev Ihtiman) |
| — | GK | BUL | Pavlin Evtimov (loan return to Lokomotiv Plovdiv) |
| — | DF | BUL | Agop Kochiyan (released) |
