= List of Bulgarian football transfers winter 2019–20 =

This is a list of Bulgarian football transfers for the 2019–20 winter transfer window. Only transfers involving a team from the two professional leagues, First League and Second League are listed.

== First League ==
=== Arda ===
In:

| No. | Pos. | Nation | Player |
|---|---|---|---|
| 19 | MF | BUL | Rumen Rumenov (from Etar) |
| 20 | DF | BUL | Stoycho Atanasov (from CSKA Sofia) |
| 21 | DF | BUL | Martin Kostadinov (from Cherno More) |
| 98 | MF | BUL | Svetoslav Kovachev (on loan from Ludogorets) |

Out:

| No. | Pos. | Nation | Player |
|---|---|---|---|
| 12 | DF | MKD | Darko Glišić (to (North Macedonia) Shkupi) |
| 19 | DF | SLE | Alie Sesay (to (Azerbaijan) Zira) |
| 20 | DF | BUL | Deyan Lozev (to Levski Sofia) |
| 29 | FW | BUL | Petar Hristov (on loan to Litex) |
| 30 | MF | POR | João Amorim (to (Portugal) Feirense) |
| — | FW | BUL | Ivaylo Dimitrov (to Slavia Sofia, previously on loan at Etar) |

=== Beroe ===
In:

| No. | Pos. | Nation | Player |
|---|---|---|---|
| 5 | DF | FRA | Teddy Mézague (Free agent) |
| 7 | MF | CMR | Pierre Fonkeu (from (France) Lens II) |
| 10 | MF | CGO | Gaius Makouta (on loan from (Portugal) Braga) |
| 11 | FW | SEN | Alioune Fall (from (Portugal) Vizela) |
| 20 | DF | FRA | Steve Furtado (Free agent) |
| 22 | MF | BRA | Octávio (from (Brazil) Perilima) |
| 27 | DF | BUL | Krum Stoyanov (from Etar) |
| 33 | GK | UKR | Hennadiy Hanyev (from Dunav) |

Out:

| No. | Pos. | Nation | Player |
|---|---|---|---|
| 1 | GK | BUL | Plamen Kolev (to Sozopol) |
| 4 | DF | TUR | Erol Alkan (released) |
| 10 | MF | BRA | Wanderson (to (Japan) Iwate Grulla Morioka) |
| 11 | DF | BUL | Ivan Bandalovski (to Botev Plovdiv) |
| 18 | DF | BUL | Petko Tsankov (to Dunav) |
| 28 | MF | POR | Rúben Brígido (to (Kazakhstan) Ordabasy) |
| 77 | MF | POR | Pedro Eugénio (to (Kazakhstan) Zhetysu) |
| 94 | MF | BUL | Yuliyan Nenov (to Dunav) |
| — | DF | BUL | Valentin Ivanov (to Litex, previously on loan at Minyor Radnevo) |

=== Botev Plovdiv ===
In:

| No. | Pos. | Nation | Player |
|---|---|---|---|
| 9 | FW | BRA | Anderson Barbosa (free agent) |
| 11 | DF | BUL | Ivan Bandalovski (from Beroe) |
| 20 | FW | COL | Fáider Burbano (from (Colombia) Santa Fe) |

Out:

| No. | Pos. | Nation | Player |
|---|---|---|---|
| 4 | DF | NED | Rodney Klooster (to (Finland) Inter Turku) |
| 5 | DF | BUL | Kristian Dimitrov (to (Croatia) Hajduk Split) |
| 20 | MF | NED | Philippe van Arnhem (released) |
| 66 | DF | BRA | Ebert (to (Armenia) Urartu) |
| 81 | DF | BUL | Atanas Zehirov (to Botev Vratsa) |
| 92 | FW | BRA | Fernando Viana (to (Hungary) Kisvárda) |

=== Botev Vratsa ===
In:

| No. | Pos. | Nation | Player |
|---|---|---|---|
| 5 | DF | BUL | Petko Ganev (on loan from Litex) |
| 7 | MF | BUL | Chavdar Ivaylov (from CSKA 1948) |
| 23 | MF | BUL | Vladislav Uzunov (from Slavia Sofia) |
| 24 | MF | FRA | Alassane N'Diaye (Free agent) |
| 34 | GK | BUL | Stamen Boyadzhiev (from Lokomotiv Plovdiv) |
| 81 | DF | BUL | Atanas Zehirov (from Botev Plovdiv) |
| 88 | MF | BRA | Tom (Free agent) |
| — | DF | SRB | Aleksandar Stanisavljević (Free agent) |

Out:

| No. | Pos. | Nation | Player |
|---|---|---|---|
| 7 | MF | BUL | Georgi Valchev (to Slavia Sofia) |
| 14 | FW | BUL | Miroslav Budinov (to Tsarsko Selo) |
| 15 | DF | CRO | Filip Žderić (to (Croatia) Cibalia) |
| 16 | DF | BUL | Apostol Popov (to Vitosha Bistritsa) |
| 23 | MF | BUL | Simeon Mechev (to Tsarsko Selo) |
| 86 | FW | BUL | Valeri Bojinov (to (Italy) Pescara) |

=== Cherno More ===
In:

| No. | Pos. | Nation | Player |
|---|---|---|---|
| 19 | MF | MTQ | Mathias Coureur (from (South Korea) Seongnam) |

Out:

| No. | Pos. | Nation | Player |
|---|---|---|---|
| 17 | DF | BUL | Martin Kostadinov (to Arda, previously on loan at Dunav) |
| 23 | MF | ROU | Ionuț Neagu (released) |
| 38 | MF | COD | Aristote N'Dongala (to (Romania) Academica Clinceni) |

=== CSKA Sofia ===
In:

| No. | Pos. | Nation | Player |
|---|---|---|---|
| 4 | DF | BUL | Bozhidar Chorbadzhiyski (loan return from (Romania) FCSB) |
| 5 | MF | NED | Vurnon Anita (Free agent) |
| 21 | MF | GHA | Edwin Gyasi (loan return from (United States) FC Dallas) |
| 23 | FW | BUL | Ahmed Ahmedov (from Dunav) |
| 24 | MF | ITA | Stefano Beltrame (from (Italy) Juventus) |
| 27 | MF | BUL | Martin Smolenski (loan return from Litex) |

Out:

| No. | Pos. | Nation | Player |
|---|---|---|---|
| 2 | DF | BUL | Stoycho Atanasov (to Arda) |
| 5 | DF | BUL | Nikolay Bodurov (to (Iran) Esteghlal) |
| 9 | FW | SCO | Tony Watt (to (Scotland) Motherwell) |
| 16 | MF | POR | Janio Bikel (to (Canada) Vancouver Whitecaps) |
| 23 | MF | BUL | Mitko Mitkov (on loan to Dunav) |
| 24 | DF | POR | Nuno Tomás (on loan to (Finland) KuPS) |
| 25 | DF | ESP | Raúl Albentosa (released) |
| 5 | MF | NED | Vurnon Anita (released) |
| 7 | MF | RUS | Denis Davydov (released) |
| 27 | MF | BUL | Martin Smolenski (on loan to Litex) |
| 29 | FW | BUL | Tonislav Yordanov (on loan to Etar, previously on loan at Litex) |

=== Dunav ===
In:

| No. | Pos. | Nation | Player |
|---|---|---|---|
| 4 | DF | BUL | Petko Tsankov (from Beroe) |
| 23 | MF | BUL | Mitko Mitkov (on loan from CSKA Sofia) |
| 45 | FW | BUL | Grigor Dolapchiev (from Vitosha Bistritsa) |
| 93 | GK | BRA | Hugo Gumeiro (from FC Kyustendil) |
| 94 | MF | BUL | Yulian Nenov (from Beroe) |

Out:

| No. | Pos. | Nation | Player |
|---|---|---|---|
| 2 | DF | GHA | Samuel Inkoom (to (Georgia (country)) Samtredia) |
| 6 | MF | LBN | Samir Ayass (to (Indonesia) Persiraja) |
| 9 | FW | BUL | Ahmed Ahmedov (to CSKA Sofia) |
| 10 | MF | RUS | Ivan Selemenev (released) |
| 16 | DF | BUL | Martin Kovachev (to (North Macedonia) Makedonija GP) |
| 33 | GK | UKR | Hennadiy Hanyev (to Beroe) |
| 77 | DF | BUL | Martin Kostadinov (loan return to Cherno More) |

=== Etar ===
In:

| No. | Pos. | Nation | Player |
|---|---|---|---|
| 8 | MF | POR | Pedro Lagoa (from (Portugal) Anadia) |
| 11 | MF | BUL | Anton Ognyanov (from Botev Galabovo) |
| 19 | FW | BUL | Tonislav Yordanov (on loan from CSKA Sofia) |
| 24 | DF | BUL | Georgi Kupenov (from Vitosha Bistritsa) |
| 44 | MF | BUL | Bozhidar Katsarov (from Tsarsko Selo) |
| 71 | MF | BUL | Toni Ivanov (on loan from Slavia Sofia) |

Out:

| No. | Pos. | Nation | Player |
|---|---|---|---|
| 3 | DF | EST | Artjom Artjunin (to (Estonia) TJK Legion) |
| 8 | MF | BUL | Rumen Rumenov (to Arda) |
| 11 | MF | BUL | Daniel Mladenov (to CSKA 1948) |
| 15 | DF | BUL | Ivan Ivanov (released) |
| 19 | FW | FRA | Chris Gadi (released) |
| 25 | DF | BUL | Krum Stoyanov (to Beroe) |
| 98 | MF | BUL | Svetoslav Kovachev (loan return to Ludogorets) |
| 99 | FW | BUL | Ivaylo Dimitrov (loan return to Arda) |

=== Levski Sofia ===
In:

| No. | Pos. | Nation | Player |
|---|---|---|---|
| 8 | MF | BUL | Simeon Slavchev (from (Azerbaijan) Qarabağ) |
| 26 | DF | BUL | Deyan Lozev (from Arda) |
| 27 | GK | BUL | Georgi Georgiev (from Slavia Sofia) |
| 40 | MF | NED | Stijn Spierings (from (Netherlands) RKC Waalwijk) |

Out:

| No. | Pos. | Nation | Player |
|---|---|---|---|
| 21 | MF | BUL | Asen Chandarov (loan return to Septemvri Sofia) |

=== Lokomotiv Plovdiv ===
In:

| No. | Pos. | Nation | Player |
|---|---|---|---|
| 4 | DF | NOR | Akinshola Akinyemi (from (Norway) Sandnes Ulf) |
| 11 | FW | AUT | Kenan Muslimović (from (Germany) FC Pipinsried) |
| 13 | MF | CRO | Mihovil Klapan (from (Slovakia) Senica) |
| 15 | MF | SUI | Valentino Pugliese (from (Switzerland) Chiasso) |
| 16 | MF | BRA | Lucas Salinas (from (Portugal) Sertanense) |
| 23 | FW | CGO | Dominique Malonga (from (Canada) Cavalry) |
| 91 | FW | BIH | Mirza Hasanbegović (from (Sweden) AIK U19) |

Out:

| No. | Pos. | Nation | Player |
|---|---|---|---|
| 6 | DF | NGA | Stephen Eze (to (Kazakhstan) Tobol) |
| 12 | FW | SVN | Alen Ožbolt (to (Slovakia) Slovan Bratislava) |
| 13 | MF | AUT | Edin Bahtić (to Tsarsko Selo) |
| 21 | MF | BUL | Georgi Iliev (retired) |
| 22 | GK | BUL | Stamen Boyadzhiev (to Botev Vratsa) |

=== Ludogorets ===
In:

| No. | Pos. | Nation | Player |
|---|---|---|---|
| 95 | MF | BRA | Cauly (from (Germany) SC Paderborn 07) |

Out:

| No. | Pos. | Nation | Player |
|---|---|---|---|
| 1 | GK | ARG | Jorge Broun (to (Argentina) Gimnasia La Plata) |
| 44 | MF | POL | Jacek Góralski (to (Kazakhstan) Kairat) |
| 98 | MF | BUL | Svetoslav Kovachev (on loan to Arda, previously on loan at Etar) |
| — | MF | RSA | May Mahlangu (to (Kazakhstan) Ordabasy, previously on loan) |

=== Slavia Sofia ===
In:

| No. | Pos. | Nation | Player |
|---|---|---|---|
| 6 | DF | BUL | Vasil Dobrev (from Septemvri Sofia) |
| 14 | FW | BUL | Ivaylo Dimitrov (from Arda) |
| 29 | DF | BUL | Venelin Filipov (from (Lithuania) Žalgiris) |
| 77 | MF | BUL | Georgi Valchev (from Botev Vratsa) |

Out:

| No. | Pos. | Nation | Player |
|---|---|---|---|
| 5 | MF | BUL | Nikolay Dyulgerov (to Sportist Svoge) |
| 6 | DF | ESP | David Bollo (to (Romania) Academica Clinceni) |
| 8 | MF | BUL | Slavcho Shokolarov (to CSKA 1948) |
| 13 | GK | BUL | Georgi Georgiev (to Levski Sofia) |
| 16 | DF | BUL | Martin Achkov (on loan to Spartak Varna) |
| 17 | MF | BUL | Hristo Ivanov (on loan to Spartak Varna) |
| 19 | DF | BUL | Dimitar Velkovski (to (Belgium) Cercle Brugge) |
| 22 | FW | BUL | Iliyan Mitsanski (released) |
| 23 | MF | BUL | Vladislav Uzunov (to Botev Vratsa) |
| 27 | DF | CRO | Nediljko Kovačević (released) |
| — | MF | BUL | Toni Ivanov (on loan to Etar, previously on loan at CSKA 1948) |

=== Tsarsko Selo ===
In:

| No. | Pos. | Nation | Player |
|---|---|---|---|
| 2 | DF | ESP | Julio (from (Romania) Voluntari) |
| 7 | MF | AUT | Edin Bahtić (from Lokomotiv Plovdiv) |
| 11 | MF | NED | Ludcinio Marengo (from (Norway) Brann) |
| 14 | MF | BUL | Simeon Mechev (from Botev Vratsa) |
| 21 | DF | BUL | Rumen Gyonov (from Vitosha Bistritsa) |
| 26 | MF | BUL | Iliya Dzhamov (from Etar) |
| 91 | FW | BUL | Miroslav Budinov (from Botev Vratsa) |
| — | DF | BRA | Léo Fioravanti (from (Brazil) São Bernardo) |

Out:

| No. | Pos. | Nation | Player |
|---|---|---|---|
| 11 | MF | NED | Rodney Antwi (on loan to (Egypt) Wadi Degla) |
| 13 | DF | BUL | Stoycho Papazov (to Hebar) |
| 14 | DF | BUL | Veselin Minev (to Vitosha Bistritsa) |
| 21 | MF | BUL | Emanuil Manev (to Neftochimic) |
| 25 | DF | BUL | Yordan Minev (to Vitosha Bistritsa) |
| 26 | DF | BUL | Georgi Hashev (released) |
| 44 | MF | BUL | Bozhidar Katsarov (to Etar) |
| 91 | FW | BUL | Ventsislav Hristov (end of contract) |

=== Vitosha Bistritsa ===
In:

| No. | Pos. | Nation | Player |
|---|---|---|---|
| 6 | MF | BUL | Stanislav Malamov (Free agent) |
| 8 | MF | BUL | Georgi Sarmov (from (Germany) Chemnitzer FC) |
| 12 | GK | BUL | Nikolay Krastev (Free agent) |
| 18 | DF | BUL | Apostol Popov (from Botev Vratsa) |
| 20 | MF | FRA | Aristote Madiani (Free agent) |
| 22 | DF | BUL | Bogomil Dyakov (from CSKA 1948) |
| 25 | DF | BUL | Yordan Minev (from Tsarsko Selo) |
| 77 | DF | BUL | Veselin Minev (from Tsarsko Selo) |

Out:

| No. | Pos. | Nation | Player |
|---|---|---|---|
| 2 | DF | BUL | Todor Gochev (to Chernomorets Burgas) |
| 6 | DF | BUL | Rumen Gyonov (to Tsarsko Selo) |
| 12 | GK | BUL | Nikolay Georgiev (to Yantra Gabrovo) |
| 18 | DF | GRE | Theofilos Kouroupis (released) |
| 21 | DF | BUL | Nikola Borisov (to Strumska Slava) |
| 22 | DF | BUL | Aleksandar Hristev (to Atletik Kuklen) |
| 24 | DF | BUL | Georgi Kupenov (to Etar) |
| 45 | FW | BUL | Grigor Dolapchiev (to Dunav) |
| 99 | DF | BUL | Vanyo Ivanov (to Montana) |

== Second League ==
=== Botev Galabovo ===
In:

| No. | Pos. | Nation | Player |
|---|---|---|---|
| 1 | GK | BUL | Mihail Mihaylov (from Minyor Radnevo) |
| 19 | MF | BUL | Krasimir Iliev (from Haskovo) |

Out:

| No. | Pos. | Nation | Player |
|---|---|---|---|
| 1 | GK | BUL | Diyan Valkov (to Lokomotiv GO) |
| 6 | DF | BUL | Ivelin Ivanov (to Minyor Radnevo) |
| 14 | MF | BUL | Valchan Chanev (to Lokomotiv GO) |
| 19 | MF | BUL | Anton Ognyanov (to Etar) |
| 39 | FW | BUL | Dimitar Aleksiev (to Pirin Blagoevgrad) |
| 77 | DF | BUL | Beysim Beysim (released) |

=== Chernomorets Balchik ===
In:

| No. | Pos. | Nation | Player |

Out:

| No. | Pos. | Nation | Player |
|---|---|---|---|
| 33 | FW | BUL | Vasil Kaloyanov (to Sportist Svoge) |

=== CSKA 1948 ===
In:

| No. | Pos. | Nation | Player |
|---|---|---|---|
| 1 | GK | BUL | Dimitar Todorov (from Pomorie) |
| 5 | DF | BUL | Mihail Minkov (from Lokomotiv GO) |
| 6 | DF | BUL | Denislav Mitsakov (from Litex) |
| 14 | DF | BUL | Ivaylo Todorov (from Lokomotiv GO) |
| 17 | MF | BUL | Daniel Mladenov (from Etar) |
| 71 | DF | BUL | Aleksandar Georgiev (from Levski Sofia U19) |
| 88 | MF | BUL | Slavcho Shokolarov (from Slavia Sofia) |

Out:

| No. | Pos. | Nation | Player |
|---|---|---|---|
| 4 | MF | BUL | Nikolay Hristov (to Spartak Pleven) |
| 12 | DF | BUL | Bogomil Dyakov (to Vitosha Bistritsa) |
| 17 | MF | BUL | Chavdar Ivaylov (to Botev Vratsa) |
| 33 | GK | BUL | Emil Mihaylov (released) |
| 71 | MF | BUL | Toni Ivanov (loan return to Slavia Sofia) |
| 88 | DF | BUL | Steven Kirilov (to Sportist Svoge) |

=== Hebar ===
In:

| No. | Pos. | Nation | Player |
|---|---|---|---|
| 13 | DF | BUL | Stoycho Papazov (from Tsarsko Selo) |
| 20 | MF | BUL | Dimitar Zakonov (from Pomorie) |
| 22 | MF | BUL | Georgi Stoichkov (from Septemvri Sofia) |

Out:

| No. | Pos. | Nation | Player |
|---|---|---|---|
| 5 | MF | BUL | Atanas Velev (to Oborishte) |
| 9 | FW | BUL | Georgi Nedyalkov (released) |

=== Kariana ===
In:

| No. | Pos. | Nation | Player |
|---|---|---|---|
| 10 | MF | BUL | Pier Pierov (on loan from Montana) |
| 12 | GK | BUL | Yuliyan Veskov (on loan from Montana) |
| 93 | MF | BUL | Vladislav Tsekov (on loan from Montana) |
| 99 | MF | BUL | Emanuil Lichev (from Minyor Radnevo) |

Out:

| No. | Pos. | Nation | Player |
|---|---|---|---|
| 10 | MF | BUL | Tsvetomir Todorov (to Strumska Slava) |
| 12 | GK | BUL | Petar Nachev (to Oborishte) |
| 77 | MF | BUL | Georgi Chakarov (released) |

=== Litex ===
In:

| No. | Pos. | Nation | Player |
|---|---|---|---|
| 6 | DF | BUL | Valentin Ivanov (from Beroe) |
| 8 | FW | BUL | Petar Hristov (on loan from Arda) |
| 15 | MF | BUL | Hristiyan Petrov (from CSKA Sofia U19) |
| 19 | MF | BUL | Martin Smolenski (on loan from CSKA Sofia) |
| 24 | GK | BUL | Martin Sheytanov (from Pomorie) |
| 77 | DF | BUL | Martin Sandov (from Lokomotiv GO) |

Out:

| No. | Pos. | Nation | Player |
|---|---|---|---|
| 3 | DF | BUL | Martin Simeonov (to Levski Karlovo) |
| 5 | DF | BUL | Petko Ganev (on loan to Botev Vratsa) |
| 6 | DF | BUL | Denislav Mitsakov (to CSKA 1948) |
| 9 | FW | BUL | Tonislav Yordanov (loan return to CSKA Sofia) |
| 19 | DF | BUL | Daniel Yordanov (released) |
| 20 | DF | BUL | Giulio Charlov (to Sportist Svoge) |

=== Lokomotiv GO ===
In:

| No. | Pos. | Nation | Player |
|---|---|---|---|
| 5 | MF | BUL | Valchan Chanev (from Botev Galabovo) |
| 7 | FW | BUL | Nikola Kakamakov (from Pavlikeni) |
| 14 | GK | BUL | Diyan Valkov (from Botev Galabovo) |
| 15 | DF | BUL | Velichko Velichkov (from Oborishte) |
| 17 | MF | BUL | Stefan Nedelchev (Free agent) |
| 77 | MF | BUL | Tsvetomir Vachev (from Lokomotiv Sofia) |

Out:

| No. | Pos. | Nation | Player |
|---|---|---|---|
| 5 | DF | BUL | Mihail Minkov (to CSKA 1948) |
| 8 | MF | BUL | Steven Slavkov (to Spartak Pleven) |
| 14 | GK | BUL | Stefan Dafovski (released) |
| 16 | DF | BUL | Daniel Yordanov (released) |
| 21 | DF | BUL | Atanas Fidanin (released) |
| 23 | DF | BUL | Ivaylo Todorov (to CSKA 1948) |
| 77 | DF | BUL | Martin Sandov (to Litex) |

=== Lokomotiv Sofia ===
In:

| No. | Pos. | Nation | Player |
|---|---|---|---|
| 11 | MF | BUL | Denislav Stanchev (from (Poland) Bytovia Bytów) |
| 89 | DF | BUL | Plamen Krachunov (from (Poland) Zagłębie Sosnowiec) |

Out:

| No. | Pos. | Nation | Player |
|---|---|---|---|
| 9 | FW | BUL | Dimitar Georgiev (released) |
| 11 | MF | BUL | Kitan Vasilev (to Septemvri Simitli) |
| 25 | MF | SRB | Zoran Švonja (to (Serbia) Javor Ivanjica) |
| 39 | DF | SRB | Saša Domić (to (Slovenia) NK Krško) |
| 77 | MF | BUL | Tsvetomir Vachev (to Lokomotiv GO) |

=== Ludogorets II ===
In:

| No. | Pos. | Nation | Player |

Out:

| No. | Pos. | Nation | Player |

=== Montana ===
In:

| No. | Pos. | Nation | Player |
|---|---|---|---|
| 15 | DF | BUL | Vanyo Ivanov (from Vitosha Bistritsa) |
| 19 | FW | BUL | Rosen Krastev (from Strumska Slava) |

Out:

| No. | Pos. | Nation | Player |
|---|---|---|---|
| 6 | DF | BUL | Ivan Kalaydzhiyski (released) |
| 14 | DF | BUL | Galin Tashev (released) |
| 15 | MF | BUL | Vladislav Tsekov (on loan to Kariana) |
| 17 | MF | BUL | Vladislav Misyak (to Yantra Gabrovo) |
| 19 | FW | BUL | Miroslav Antonov (to (Greece) Aiolikos) |
| 55 | GK | BUL | Yuliyan Veskov (on loan to Kariana) |
| 77 | MF | BUL | Pier Pierov (on loan to Kariana) |

=== Neftochimic ===
In:

| No. | Pos. | Nation | Player |
|---|---|---|---|
| 8 | MF | BUL | Emanuil Manev (from Tsarsko Selo) |

Out:

| No. | Pos. | Nation | Player |
|---|---|---|---|
| 8 | MF | BUL | Mihail Georgiev (to Chernomorets Burgas) |
| 11 | MF | BUL | Borimir Karamfilov (to Borislav Parvomay) |
| 32 | DF | BUL | Yoliyan Milkov (retired) |

=== Pirin Blagoevgrad ===
In:

| No. | Pos. | Nation | Player |
|---|---|---|---|
| 1 | GK | SUI | Francesco Ruberto (from (Switzerland) Thun) |
| 8 | FW | ENG | Ibrahim Meite (on loan from (England) Crawley Town) |
| 23 | FW | BUL | Dimitar Aleksiev (from Botev Galabovo) |

Out:

| No. | Pos. | Nation | Player |
|---|---|---|---|
| 5 | DF | BUL | Lyubomir Gutsev (released) |
| 8 | FW | CIV | Bradley Meledje (released) |
| 21 | DF | BUL | Rumen Trifonov (released) |
| 22 | GK | BUL | Dimitar Pangev (to Vihren) |
| 23 | DF | BUL | Iliyan Mitrev (released) |
| 26 | MF | BUL | Lyubomir Tsolev (released) |
| 30 | FW | MKD | Marjan Altiparmakovski (released) |

=== Pomorie ===
In:

| No. | Pos. | Nation | Player |

Out:

| No. | Pos. | Nation | Player |
|---|---|---|---|
| 1 | GK | BUL | Martin Sheytanov (to Litex) |
| 4 | DF | BUL | Stoyan Kizhev (to Chernomorets Burgas) |
| 6 | DF | BUL | Ivan Yanchev (to Sozopol) |
| 7 | MF | BUL | Dimitar Zakonov (to Hebar) |
| 11 | MF | BUL | Zhivko Iliev (to Sozopol) |
| 12 | GK | BUL | Dimitar Todorov (to CSKA 1948) |
| 14 | MF | BUL | Zhivko Zhekov (to Chernomorets Burgas) |
| 23 | DF | BUL | Zhivko Hadzhiev (to Chernomorets Burgas) |
| 25 | MF | BUL | Milen Tanev (to Chernomorets Burgas) |

=== Septemvri Sofia ===
In:

| No. | Pos. | Nation | Player |
|---|---|---|---|
| 10 | MF | BUL | Asen Chandarov (loan return from Levski Sofia) |

Out:

| No. | Pos. | Nation | Player |
|---|---|---|---|
| 22 | MF | BUL | Georgi Stoichkov (to Hebar) |
| — | DF | BUL | Vasil Dobrev (to Slavia Sofia, previously on loan at Spartak Varna) |

=== Spartak Pleven ===
In:

| No. | Pos. | Nation | Player |
|---|---|---|---|
| 10 | MF | BUL | Steven Slavkov (from Lokomotiv GO) |
| 15 | DF | BUL | Raif Muradov (from Rozova Dolina) |
| 22 | MF | BUL | Nikolay Hristov (from CSKA 1948) |

Out:

| No. | Pos. | Nation | Player |
|---|---|---|---|
| 17 | MF | BUL | Petar Tonchev (released) |
| 20 | MF | BUL | Hosein Traykov (to Sevlievo) |
| 21 | DF | BUL | Valentino Makaveev (to Parva Atomna) |
| 22 | MF | BUL | Yanislav Ivanov (to Vihar Slavyanovo) |
| 23 | MF | BUL | Hristo Todorov (to Balkan Botevgrad) |

=== Spartak Varna ===
In:

| No. | Pos. | Nation | Player |
|---|---|---|---|
| 1 | GK | BUL | Georgi Stavrev (from (Romania) CS Făurei) |
| 4 | DF | NED | Jerichio Valentijn (from (Netherlands) RKVV Westlandia) |
| 7 | MF | BUL | Hristo Ivanov (on loan from Slavia Sofia) |
| 11 | DF | BUL | Ventsislav Gurkov (from Nadezhda Dobroslavtsi) |
| 15 | DF | FRA | Lionel Samba (from Sevlievo) |
| 21 | MF | BUL | Kristian Varbanov (from Dunav) |
| 24 | DF | BUL | Blagovest Gachev (from Shumen) |
| 66 | DF | BUL | Martin Achkov (on loan from Slavia Sofia) |
| 90 | MF | BUL | Ivelin Angelov (from Ludogorets U19) |

Out:

| No. | Pos. | Nation | Player |
|---|---|---|---|
| 1 | GK | BUL | Ivan Ivanov (released) |
| 4 | DF | BUL | Ivo Ivanov (to Levski Karlovo) |
| 10 | FW | BUL | Rumen Nikolov (released) |
| 11 | MF | BUL | Filip Kolev (loan return to Lokomotiv Plovdiv) |
| 13 | MF | BUL | Vasko Boev (to Ustrem Donchevo) |
| 15 | DF | BUL | Boyan Iliev (released) |
| 24 | MF | BUL | Anton Kostadinov (to Pirin Razlog) |
| 83 | DF | BUL | Ivan Penev (released) |

=== Strumska Slava ===
In:

| No. | Pos. | Nation | Player |
|---|---|---|---|
| 7 | FW | MKD | Andrian Chavoli (from (North Macedonia) Sileks) |
| 11 | MF | BUL | Tsvetomir Todorov (from Kariana) |
| 33 | MF | BUL | Ivaylo Stoyanov (from Chavdar Etropole) |
| 77 | DF | BUL | Nikola Borisov (from Vitosha Bistritsa) |
| 99 | GK | BUL | Simeon Simeonov (from Vihren) |

Out:

| No. | Pos. | Nation | Player |
|---|---|---|---|
| 1 | GK | BUL | Slavi Petrov (released) |
| 3 | DF | BUL | Nikolay Nikolov (released) |
| 7 | MF | BUL | Kristian Tasev (released) |
| 11 | FW | BUL | Oktay Yusein (loan return to Lokomotiv Plovdiv) |
| 19 | MF | BUL | Hristo Mladenov (to Septemvri Simitli) |
| 33 | MF | BUL | Bogomil Hristov (to Balkan Botevgrad) |
| 77 | FW | BUL | Rosen Krastev (to Montana) |
