= Nenov =

Nenov (Bulgarian: Ненов) is a Bulgarian surname. Notable people with the name include:

- Dimcho Nenov (born 1967), Bulgarian football manager and former footballer
- Dimitar Nenov (1901–1953), Bulgarian classical pianist, composer, music pedagogue and architect
- Ivan Nenov (1902–1997), Bulgarian painter
- Milcho Nenov (born 1957), Bulgarian ice hockey player
- Neno Nenov (born 1972), Bulgarian footballer and manager
- Neyko Nenov (1961–2015), Bulgarian major general
- Nikola Nenov (1907–1996), Bulgarian cyclist
- Rumen Nenov (1969–2017), Bulgarian footballer
- Stanimir Nenov (born 1955), Bulgarian middle-distance runner
- Stayko Nenov (born 1953), Bulgarian sports shooter
- Yuliyan Nenov (born 1994), Bulgarian professional footballer
