= Shaban Osmanov =

Bulgarian footballer

Personal information
- Date of birth: 17 February 1991 (age 35)
- Place of birth: Asenovgrad, Bulgaria
- Position: Midfielder

Team information
- Current team: Borislav Parvomay
- Number: 10

Youth career
- Lokomotiv Plovdiv

Senior career*
Years	Team	Apps	(Gls)
2011–2013	Asenovets		
2013–2014	Vereya		
2014	Asenovets		
2015	Lokomotiv Plovdiv	2	(0)
2015	Asenovets		
2016	Oborishte	6	(0)
2016–	Borislav Parvomay	0	(0)
- * Club domestic league appearances and goals as of 1 August 2016

Shaban Osmanov (Bulgarian: Шабан Османов; born 17 February 1991) is a Bulgarian footballer who plays as a midfielder for Third League club Borislav Parvomay.

== Career ==
Osmanov started his career at his hometown club Asenovets. In July 2013, he moved to Vereya but was released after one season. Osmanov returned to Asenovets for the 2014/15 season but in February 2015 he signed for Lokomotiv Plovdiv following a successful trial period. He made only 2 appearances in the A PFG and was released in the summer. In August 2015, Osmanov joined Asenovets again but 6 months later he signed for Oborishte Panagyurishte.

In July 2016, Osmanov joined Borislav Parvomay.
