= Ferdi Myumyunov =

Bulgarian footballer

Personal information
- Full name: Ferdi Fikretov Myumyunov
- Date of birth: 26 March 1992 (age 34)
- Place of birth: Asenovgrad, Bulgaria
- Height: 1.87 m (6 ft 1 1/2 in)
- Position: Goalkeeper

Team information
- Current team: SG 1911 Bad Soden
- Number: 1

Youth career
- Asenovets
- Lokomotiv Plovdiv

Senior career*
| Years | Team | Apps | (Gls) |
| 2015 | Sopoti Librazhd | 11 | (0) |
| 2015 | Turbina Cërrik | 17 | (0) |
| 2016 | Borislav Parvomay | 32 | (0) |
| 2017–2019 | Neftochimic | 49 | (0) |
| 2019–2020 | Vihren Sandanski | 21 | (0) |
| 2020-2021 | Türkgücü Friedberg | 5 | (0) |
| 2021-2022 | Montana | 14 | (0) |
| 2022 | Hanauer SC 1960 | 14 | (0) |
| 2023-2025 | SF Seligenstadt | 50 | (0) |
- * Club domestic league appearances and goals as of 08:38, 2 April 2022 (UTC)

Ferdi Myumyunov (Bulgarian: Ферди Мюмюнов; born 26 March 1992) is a Bulgarian professional footballer who plays as a goalkeeper for SG 1911 Bad Soden.

== Club career ==
=== Early career ===
He was chosen as the best senior youth player of Lokomotiv Plovdiv in Bulgaria in 2010. He has been selected three time for the best goalkeeper of the week in Albania during the year 2015.

=== Levski Karlovo ===
On 10 January 2016 Myumyunov, after a great half season with Borislav Parvomay in the Bulgarian Third League, he signed with the Bulgarian Second League team Levski Karlovo.
