= FC Botev Galabovo =

Bulgarian football club

- Full name: Football Club Botev Galabovo
- Founded: 1945; 81 years ago
- Ground: Trace Arena, Stara Zagora
- Capacity: 3,500
- Chairman: Stoyan Dikov
- Head coach: Mitko Kotsinov
- League: Regional Groups
- 2019–20: Second League, 10th (relegated)
- Website: http://botev-galabovo.com
Home colours	Away colours

Botev (Bulgarian: Ботев) is a Bulgarian football club based in Galabovo, Stara Zagora Province. The club last played in the Second League, the second division of Bulgarian football, having been promoted as champions of the South-Eastern V Group in 2012–13. The club was founded in 1945. Botev's home ground is the Energetik Stadium, a 3,000 all-seater stadium.

At the end of the 1969–70 season, Botev reached the second tier of Bulgarian football for the first time in their history. However, they were relegated the following season despite their efforts.

== History ==
Botev Galabovo was founded in 1945. The team has never played in the Bulgarian first tier, spending their entire history bouncing between the second and third tiers.

In 2019, Botev reached the quarter-finals of the Bulgarian Cup, beating FC Vitosha Bistritsa in the round of 16, with a score of 2–1.

In May 2020, Botev was disqualified from the 2019-20 season in the second tier due to financial problems. The team then refused to be admitted into the third tier for the upcoming season, instead opting to start from the fourth regional league.

== Honours ==
South-Eastern V Group:

- Winners (1): 2012–13

== Current squad ==
As of 1 February 2020

Note: Flags indicate national team as defined under FIFA eligibility rules; some limited exceptions apply. Players may hold more than one non-FIFA nationality.

No.	Pos.	Nation	Player
1	GK	BUL	Hristomir Demerdzhiev
3	DF	BUL	Steliyan Marinkov
5	DF	BUL	Tsvetelin Radev
7	MF	BUL	Ivan Vinkov
8	MF	BUL	Dimitar Traykov
9	MF	BUL	Dimitar Atanasov (on loan from Arda)
10	MF	BUL	Emiliyan Zotev
11	DF	BUL	Asparuh Smilkov
15	DF	BUL	Emin Ahmed
17	MF	BUL	Dzhuneyt Yashar
19	MF	BUL	Krasimir Iliev

No.	Pos.	Nation	Player
20	DF	BUL	Emil Ivanov
21	MF	BUL	Mitko Plahov
22	MF	BUL	Plamen Kolarov
27	DF	BUL	Stanislav Katrankov
30	MF	BUL	Isus Angelov
31	GK	BUL	Ivan Dermendzhiev
33	DF	BUL	Nikolay Yankov
92	FW	BUL	Eray Karadayi (on loan from Arda)
98	MF	BUL	Berkay Halil
99	DF	BUL	Krasimir Zdravkov

For recent transfers, see Transfers summer 2019 and Transfers winter 2019–20.
