= Angel Stoykov =

Bulgarian footballer

Personal information
- Full name: Angel Georgiev Stoykov
- Date of birth: 24 August 1977 (age 49)
- Place of birth: Burgas, PR Bulgaria
- Height: 1.84 m (6 ft 1/2 in)
- Position: Midfielder

Team information
- Current team: Chernomorets Burgas (manager) Bulgaria U18 (manager)

Youth career
- 1986–1993: Chernomorets Burgas
- 1993–1995: Lokomotiv Sofia

Senior career*
Years	Team	Apps	(Gls)
1994–1995	Lokomotiv Sofia	8	(1)
1995–2001	Chernomorets Burgas	151	(18)
2001	Spartak Varna	9	(0)
2002	CSKA Sofia	7	(1)
2002–2004	Marek Dupnitsa	63	(3)
2004–2006	Slavia Sofia	85	(6)
2007–2008	Nea Salamina	17	(0)
2008	Kaliakra Kavarna	19	(2)
2009	Spartak Varna	23	(1)
2010–2011	Nesebar	34	(3)
Total		422	(38)

Managerial career
- 2011: Neftochimic Burgas (assistant)
- 2011–2012: Neftochimic Burgas
- 2013: Chernomorets Burgas (youth coach)
- 2013–2015: Master Burgas
- 2016–2023: Bulgaria U19
- 2023–: Chernomorets Burgas
- 2023–: Bulgaria U18
- * Club domestic league appearances and goals

Angel Georgiev Stoykov (Bulgarian: Ангел Стойков; born 24 August 1977) is a former Bulgarian footballer who played as a midfielder.

He played for Chernomorets Burgas, Spartak Varna, CSKA Sofia, Marek Dupnitsa, Slavia Sofia, Cypriot Nea Salamis Famagusta FC and Kaliakra Kavarna. Stoykov was appointed as manager of Montana in February 2023, remaining in this capacity until May 2023.
