= Petar Genchev =

Bulgarian footballer (born 1998)

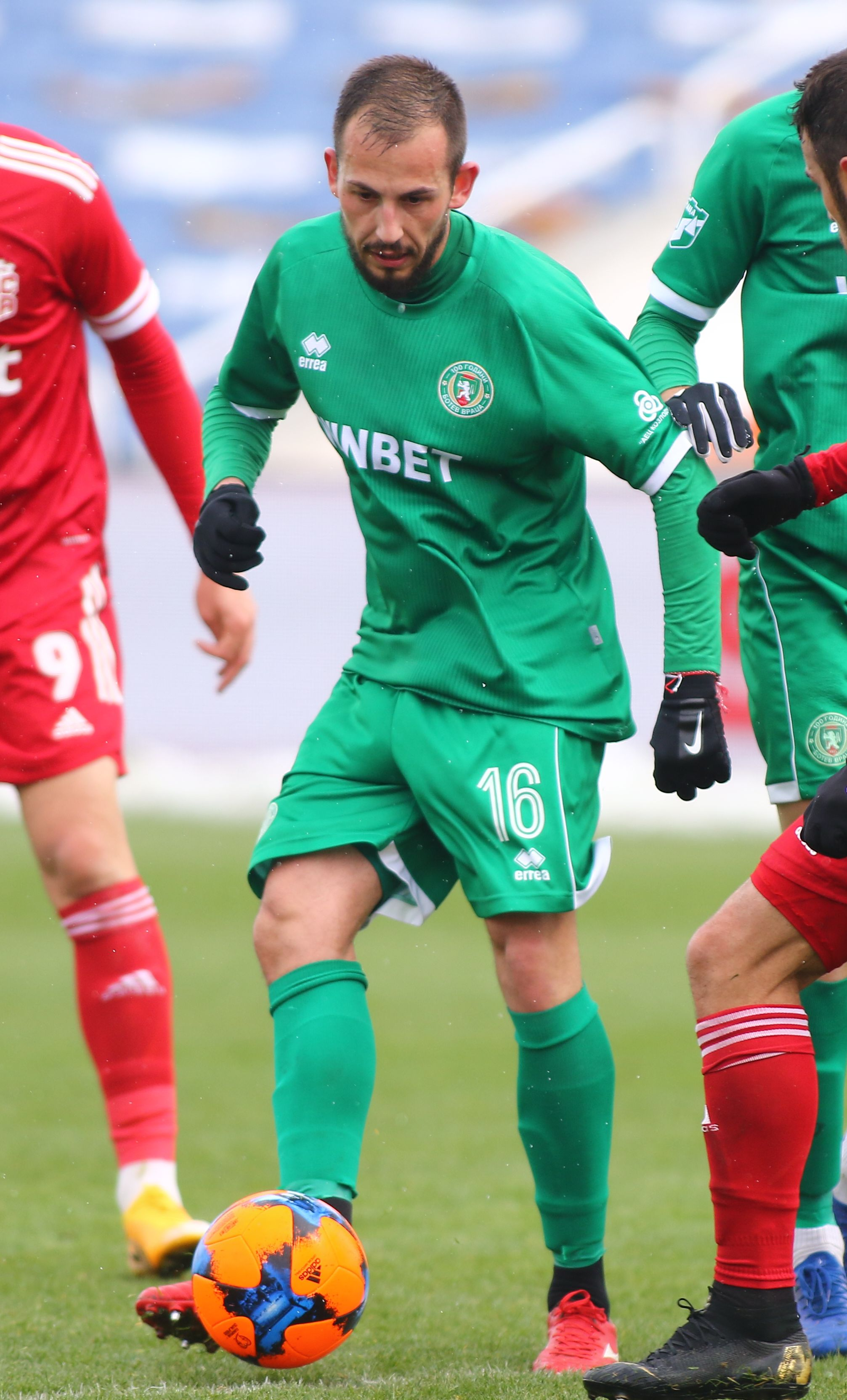

Personal information
- Full name: Petar Rumenov Genchev
- Date of birth: 29 March 1998 (age 28)
- Place of birth: Burgas, Bulgaria
- Height: 1.84 m (6 ft 1/2 in)
- Position: Centre back

Team information
- Current team: Krumovgrad
- Number: 5

Youth career
- –2015: Dit Sofia
- 2015–2016: Septemvri Sofia

Senior career*
Years	Team	Apps	(Gls)
2015–2019	Septemvri Sofia	51	(1)
2016	→ Pirin Razlog (loan)	9	(0)
2018–2019	→ CSKA 1948 (loan)	14	(0)
2019–2020	Ludogorets II	32	(1)
2021	Botev Vratsa	4	(0)
2021–2022	Levski Lom	19	(0)
2022–2023	Sozopol	32	(1)
2023–2026	Chernomorets Burgas	78	(7)
2026–	Krumovgrad	3	(0)

International career^{‡}
2015–2017	Bulgaria U19	17	(1)
2017–2020	Bulgaria U21	2	(0)
- * Club domestic league appearances and goals as of 30 October 2026 ‡ National team caps and goals as of 21:58, 14 November 2017 (UTC)

Petar Genchev (Bulgarian: Петър Генчев; born 29 March 1998) is a Bulgarian footballer who plays as a centre-back for Krumovgrad.

== Career ==
=== Septemvri Sofia ===
Genchev begin his career in Chernomoretz Burgas and won bronze medal at 2013 with U15 team, coached by Angel Stoykov. After the tournament, he moved with 5 more Burgas boys at Dit Sofia, later moving to Septemvri Sofia after the Dit academy took Septemvri. In 2015 he started the season with Septemvri in V Group, but later during the same season he was loaned to Pirin Razlog in the B Group.

Genchev completed his professional debut on 17 July 2017, playing in the first league game for the season in First League against Dunav Ruse. He was chosen for the perfect eleven from the second round of First League match against Pirin Blagoevgrad, which was won by Septemvri.

On 4 July 2018, Genchev was loaned to Second League club CSKA 1948 until the end of the season.

He left Septemvri Sofia in July 2019.

=== Ludogorets Razgrad ===
In August 2019 Genchev signed with the Bulgarian champions Ludogorets Razgrad and joined to their reserve squad. He made his professional debut on 5 August in a 2:0 league victory over Spartak Pleven.

On 24 August 2020 Genchev was included in the Champions League squad for the match against FC Midtjylland after the injury of Georgi Terziev.

=== Botev Vratsa ===
In December 2020 Genchev resigned his contract with Ludogorets Razgrad to join Botev Vratsa in First League

== International career ==
=== Youth levels ===
Genchev was called up for the Bulgaria U19 team for the 2017 European Under-19 Championship qualification from 22 to 27 March 2017. Playing in all three matches, Bulgaria qualified for the knockout phase.

== Career statistics ==
=== Club ===
As of 2 December 2018

Club performance			League		Cup		Continental		Other		Total	
Club	League	Season	Apps	Goals	Apps	Goals	Apps	Goals	Apps	Goals	Apps	Goals
Bulgaria			League		Bulgarian Cup		Europe		Other		Total	
Septemvri Sofia	V Group	2015–16	16	0	0	0	–		–		16	0
Septemvri Sofia	Second League	2016–17	21	1	1	0	–		1	0	23	1
Septemvri Sofia	First League	2017–18	14	0	2	0	–		0	0	16	0
Septemvri Sofia	Total		51	1	3	0	0	0	1	0	55	1
Pirin Razlog (loan)	B Group	2015-16	9	0	0	0	–		–		9	0
CSKA 1948 (loan)	Second League	2018–19	14	0	0	0	–		–		14	0
Ludogorets Razgrad II	Second League	2019–20	14	0	–		–		–		14	0
Career statistics			88	1	3	0	0	0	1	0	89	1
