= Slavi Kostenski =

Bulgarian footballer

Personal information
- Full name: Slavi Sabev Kostenski
- Date of birth: 21 March 1981 (age 45)
- Place of birth: Burgas, Bulgaria
- Height: 1.86 m (6 ft 1 in)
- Position: Defender

Team information
- Current team: without club

Senior career*
Years	Team	Apps	(Gls)
2001–2004	Chernomorets Burgas	48	(1)
2005–2006	Slavia Sofia	1	(0)
2006–2007	Irtysh Pavlodar	34	(3)
2007	Chernomorets Burgas	6	(0)
2008	Nesebar	15	(0)
2008	Spartak Varna	3	(0)
2009–2010	Chernomorets Balchik	47	(5)
2011	Botev Kozloduy	21	(3)
2012	Chernomorets Pomorie	10	(0)
2012–2013	Xagħra United	13	(2)
2014–2015	PFC Burgas	5	(0)
2015–2016	Karnobat	12	(0)
Total		177	(10)

Managerial career
- 2017–2018: Chernomorets Burgas
- 2018–2019: Chernomorets Burgas (assistant)
- 2020: Chernomorets Burgas
- * Club domestic league appearances and goals

Slavi Kostenski (Bulgarian: Слави Костенски; born 21 March 1981) is a former Bulgarian footballer who played as a defender. He is the head coach at Chernomorets Burgas.

== Career ==
Kostenski was raised in Chernomorets Burgas's youth teams. Then he played for Slavia Sofia and kazakhstani football club FC Irtysh.

In 2012 Kostenski moved to Gozo, Malta and signed with Xagħra United, where he played 13 matches and scored 2 goals.
