= Iliya Dzhamov =

Bulgarian footballer

Personal information
- Full name: Iliya Dimitrov Dzhamov
- Date of birth: 11 June 1998 (age 28)
- Place of birth: Sofia, Bulgaria
- Height: 1.85 m (6 ft 1 in)
- Position: Midfielder

Team information
- Current team: Chernomorets Burgas

Youth career
- –2013: CSKA Sofia
- 2013–2016: Crystal Palace

Senior career*
Years	Team	Apps	(Gls)
2017	CSKA 1948	–	(–)
2017	Oborishte	1	(0)
2018	Lokomotiv Plovdiv	0	(0)
2018	Dobrudzha	11	(1)
2019	Etar	1	(0)
2020	Tsarsko Selo	4	(0)
2021-	Chernomorets Burgas	0	(0)
- * Club domestic league appearances and goals as of 15 July 2020

Iliya Dzhamov (Bulgarian: Илия Джамов; born 11 June 1998) is a Bulgarian footballer who plays as a midfielder for Bulgarian Third League club Chernomorets Burgas.

== Career ==
On 12 February 2019, Dzhamov signed a contract with Etar Veliko Tarnovo after a successful trial period with the club. He made his debut in a 3–0 home win over Vereya on 29 March 2019, playing full 90 minutes.
