= Christos Kontochristos =

Greek footballer (born 1991)

Personal information
- Full name: Christos Kontochristos
- Date of birth: 3 January 1991 (age 35)
- Place of birth: Nafpaktos, Greece
- Height: 1.81 m (5 ft 11 1/2 in)
- Position: Left-back

Youth career
- –2009: Panionios

Senior career*
Years	Team	Apps	(Gls)
2009–2013	Panionios	5	(0)
2011	→ Nafpaktiakos (loan)	6	(0)
2011–2012	→ Niki Volos (loan)	13	(0)
2013–2014	Lamia	23	(0)
2014–2015	Panachaiki	20	(2)
2015–2016	AEL	13	(0)
2016	Montana	11	(0)
2017–2018	Panegialios	8	(0)
2018–2019	Lokomotiv Sofia	39	(0)
2019–2020	Pirin Blagoevgrad	14	(1)
2020–2021	Diagoras	22	(1)
2021–2023	Kallithea	9	(0)
2023	Panachaiki	3	(0)
2023–2024	Panegialios		

International career
2010	Greece U19	1	(0)
- * Club domestic league appearances and goals as of 16 June 2023

Christos Kontochristos (Greek: Χρήστος Κοντοχρήστος; born 3 January 1991) is a Greek professional footballer who plays as a left-back.

== Club career ==
He started his career from the youth teams of Panionios in 2008. After two years he was given on loan to Nafpaktiakos Asteras, and Niki Volos, until 1 June 2012, when he returned to Panionios and played in 5 games in the Super League. A year later he moved to Football League club Lamia 1964, where he had (so far) his most productive season with 23 appearances. On 26 August 2014 he joined another second Division club, Panachaiki, where he played in 20 league games. On 24 July 2015, he signed with AEL On 9 September 2016, he signed a year contract with Bulgarian Bulgarian First League club Montana. Prior to his signature, Kontochristos filed an action against AEL, for financial reasons of a total of €14,850 and for detraction of personality as he excluded from the summer preparation without earlier notification. Kontochristos had followed the owner of the club Alexis Kougias from his earlier club Panachaiki, asking for a contract release in order to avoid missing the end of the summer window. On 9 September 2016, has signed a contract since 31 December 2017 with Bulgarian club Montana. On 7 July 2017, Kontochristos has signed a year contract with Panegialios for an undisclosed fee. On 2 February 2018, he signed with Second League Bulgarian club Lokomotiv Sofia till the end of the 2018–19 season. On 16 August 2019, he signed with Second League Bulgarian club OFC Pirin Blagoevgrad till the end of the 2019–20 season.

== International career ==
Kontochristos has debuted for Greece U19 National on 14 April 2010, in an International Friendly game against Serbia (1-1).
