= Valentin Ivanov (footballer, born 2000) =

Bulgarian footballer

Personal information
- Full name: Valentin Ivanov Ivanov
- Date of birth: 1 April 2000 (age 26)
- Place of birth: Kazanlak, Bulgaria
- Height: 1.78 m (5 ft 10 in)
- Position: Defender

Team information
- Current team: Chernomorets Burgas
- Number: 77

Youth career
- 2010–2018: Beroe

Senior career*
Years	Team	Apps	(Gls)
2018–2019	Beroe	3	(0)
2019	→ Minyor Radnevo (loan)	?	(?)
2020	Litex Lovech	0	(0)
2020–	Chernomorets Burgas	0	(0)
- * Club domestic league appearances and goals as of 1 August 2020

Valentin Ivanov (Bulgarian: Валентин Иванов; born 1 April 2000) is a Bulgarian footballer who plays as a defender for Chernomorets Burgas.

== Career ==
On 20 May 2018, he made his professional debut in Beroe's 1–0 loss at CSKA Sofia, replacing Borislav Tsonev in the 85th minute. On 29 May 2019, Ivanov signed his first professional contract with the club.

== Career statistics ==
=== Club ===
As of 27 May 2019

Club	League	Season	League		Cup		Continental		Total	
Club	League	Season	Apps	Goals	Apps	Goals	Apps	Goals	Apps	Goals
Beroe	First League	2017–18	1	0	0	0	—		1	0
Beroe	First League	2018–19	2	0	0	0	—		2	0
Career statistics			3	0	0	0	0	0	3	0
