= Dimitar Atanasov (footballer) =

Bulgarian footballer

Personal information
- Full name: Dimitar Mariykov Atanasov
- Date of birth: 26 April 1999 (age 27)
- Place of birth: Sofia, Bulgaria
- Position: Midfielder

Youth career
- PFC Levski Sofia
- Vitosha Bistritsa

Senior career*
Years	Team	Apps	(Gls)
2017–2018	Vitosha Bistritsa	1	(0)
2018	Real Mississauga		
2019	Slivnishki Geroy	5	(2)
2019–2020	Arda	1	(0)
2019–2020	→ Botev Galabovo (loan)	13	(0)
2020	Levski Chepintsi	20	(12)
2021–2022	Marek Dupnitsa	16	(1)
2022	Sportist Svoge	12	(1)
2022	Union Pettenbach	13	(0)
2023	Rilski Sportist Samokov		
2023	Doxa Drama		
- * Club domestic league appearances and goals as of 7 January 2023

Dimitar Atanasov (Bulgarian: Димитър Атанасов; born 26 April 1999) is a Bulgarian footballer who plays as a midfielder.

== Club career ==
=== Early career ===
Atanasov began his professional career in 2018 with FC Vitosha Bistritsa in the First Professional Football League. In 2018, he played abroad in the Canadian Soccer League with SC Real Mississauga. In 2019, he signed with FC Arda Kardzhali but was loaned to FC Botev Galabovo in the Second League. In 2020, Arda released him from his contract.

=== Bulgaria ===
In 2021, he signed with league rivals FC Marek Dupnitsa. He recorded his first goal for Marek on August 13, 2021, against FC Minyor Pernik. In January 2022, he was transferred to FC Sportist Svoge. He made his debut on February 19, 2022, against FC Levski Lom, recording his first goal for the club. After the conclusion of the season, he was released from his contract with Svoge.

=== Austria ===
Following his stint with Svoge, he played abroad once more this time in Austria with Union Pettenbach. In total, he played in 13 matches.

=== Return to Bulgaria ===
After a brief run abroad in Austria, he returned to his native country in 2023 to secure a deal with Rilski Sportist Samokov during the January transfer window. After the conclusion of the season, he left Rilski to join Greek side Doxa Drama in the Greek third division in August 2023.
