= Everton Dias =

Brazilian footballer (born 1990)

Personal information
- Full name: Everton Macedo Dias
- Date of birth: June 4, 1990 (age 36)
- Place of birth: São Paulo, Brazil
- Height: 1.83 m (6 ft 0 in)
- Positions: Centre back; defensive midfielder

Team information
- Current team: Santa Cruz

Senior career*
Years	Team	Apps	(Gls)
2011–2012	Mogi Mirim	0	(0)
2012–2014	Oeste	46	(2)
2015–2016	Capivariano	0	(0)
2015	→ Bragantino (loan)	15	(2)
2016–2017	Bragantino	6	(0)
2017	→ Aparecidense (loan)	0	(0)
2017	→ Cascavel (loan)	0	(0)
2017	Tombense	12	(0)
2018	Atlético Tubarão	0	(0)
2019	Veranópolis	0	(0)
2019	Brusque	0	(0)
2019	Luverdense	4	(1)
2019	Tsarsko Selo	4	(0)
2020	Sampaio Corrêa	5	(2)
2020	São Caetano	9	(1)
2020	Ferroviária	6	(0)
2021	Brasil de Pelotas	9	(0)
2021–	Santa Cruz	0	(0)
- * Club domestic league appearances and goals as of 10 September 2019

Everton Macedo Dias (born 4 June 1990) is a Brazilian professional footballer who plays as a defensive midfielder for Santa Cruz.
