= Ivan Kolev (footballer, born 1995) =

Bulgarian footballer (born 1995)

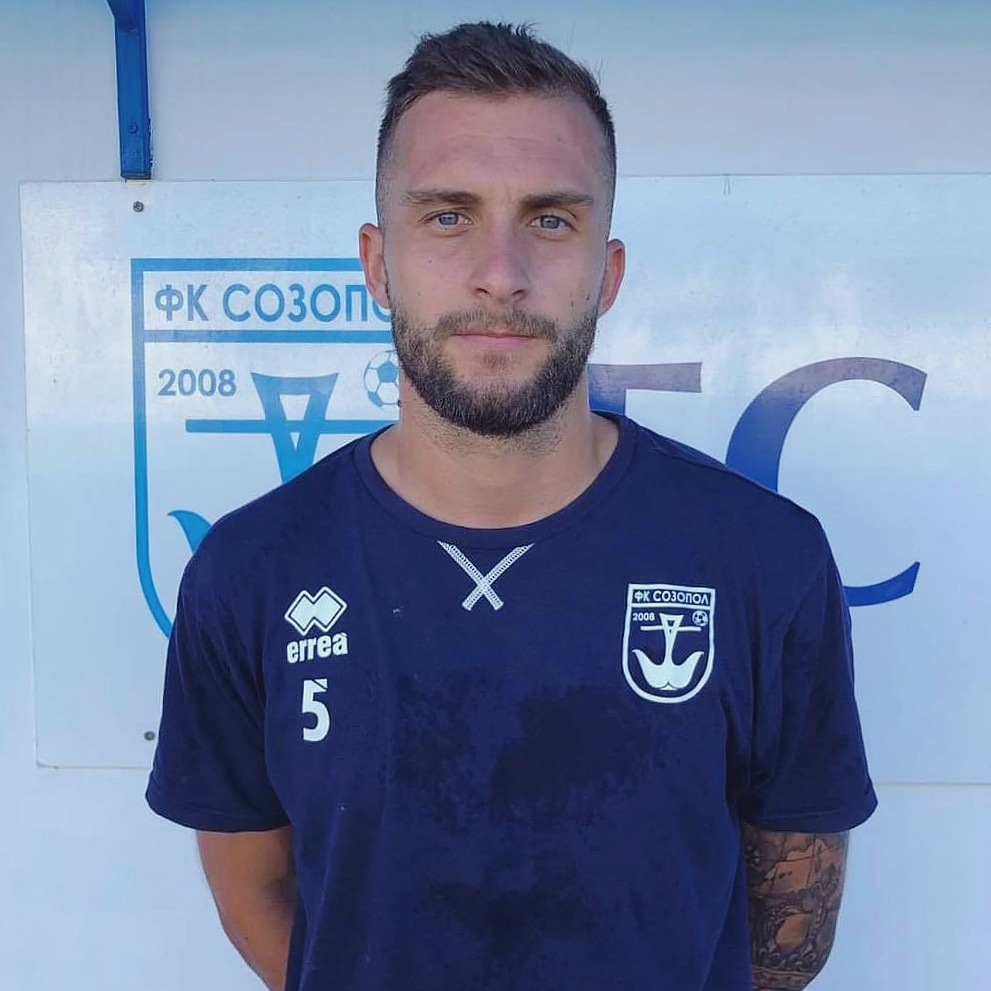

Personal information
- Full name: Ivan Veselinov Kolev
- Date of birth: 15 October 1995 (age 31)
- Place of birth: Kazanlak, Bulgaria
- Height: 1.82 m (5 ft 11 1/2 in)
- Position: Forward

Team information
- Current team: Nesebar
- Number: 9

Youth career
- Rozova Dolina
- Slavia Sofia

Senior career*
Years	Team	Apps	(Gls)
2014–2015	Rozova Dolina	24	(8)
2015–2016	Oborishte	26	(8)
2016–2017	Lokomotiv Plovdiv	0	(0)
2016–2017	→ Pomorie (loan)	20	(5)
2017	Nesebar	15	(8)
2018	Botev Vratsa	20	(7)
2019	Lokomotiv GO	10	(4)
2019–2020	Neftochimic	16	(4)
2020–2021	Sozopol	27	(8)
2021	Septemvri Sofia	3	(0)
2021–2022	Spartak Varna	25	(11)
2022–2023	Sirens F.C.	19	(4)
2023–2024	Dunav Ruse	19	(1)
2024–2025	Marek	22	(6)
2025–	Nesebar	34	(29)
- * Club domestic league appearances and goals as of 09:41, 10 October 2026 (UTC)

Ivan Kolev (Bulgarian: Иван Колев; born 15 October 1995) is a Bulgarian footballer who plays for as a forward for Nesebar.

== Career ==
In September 2021 Kolev signed with Spartak Varna.

In July 2022 Kolev signed with FC Sirens, Malta.
