= Ivan Kirev =

Bulgarian footballer

Personal information
- Full name: Ivan Antonov Kirev
- Date of birth: 12 December 1998 (age 27)
- Place of birth: Gotse Delchev, Bulgaria
- Position: Midfielder

Team information
- Current team: Levski Lom

Youth career
- Botev Plovdiv

Senior career*
Years	Team	Apps	(Gls)
2016–2017	Botev Plovdiv	2	(0)
2017	→ Bansko (loan)	15	(0)
2018	Sevlievo	13	(3)
2018–2019	Pirin Razlog	26	(6)
2019	Spartak Varna	5	(0)
2019–	Borislav Parvomay	0	(0)
2019–	Levski Lom	0	(0)

International career
2016–2017	Bulgaria U19	1	(0)
- * Club domestic league appearances and goals as of 1 September 2019

Ivan Kirev (Bulgarian: Иван Кирев; born 12 December 1998) is a Bulgarian footballer who plays as a midfielder for Borislav Parvomay.

== Career ==
On 11 September 2016, Kirev made his professional debut for Botev Plovdiv in a 1–2 away defeat by Pirin Blagoevgrad, coming on as substitute for Serkan Yusein. On 16 June 2017, he was loaned to Maritsa Plovdiv but returned to his parent club before the beginning of the season. A few days later, he was loaned to Bansko.
