= Aleksandar Stanisavljević (footballer, born 1998) =

Serbian footballer

Personal information
- Date of birth: 27 January 1998 (age 28)
- Place of birth: Leskovac, Serbia
- Height: 1.94 m (6 ft 4 in)
- Position: Centre back

Youth career
- 2009–2018: CSKA Moscow

Senior career*
Years	Team	Apps	(Gls)
2018–2019	Slavia Sofia	13	(0)
2019	Radnik Surdulica	0	(0)
2020	Botev Vratsa	0	(0)
2021–2022	Tom Tomsk	5	(1)

International career
2013–2015	Serbia U17	9	(3)
- * Club domestic league appearances and goals as of 21 May 2022

Aleksandar Stanisavljević (Serbian Cyrillic: Александар Станисављевић; Russian: Александр Станисавлевич; born 27 January 1998) is a Serbian professional footballer who plays as a defender. He also holds Russian citizenship.

== Career statistics ==
=== Club ===
As of 24 May 2019

Club performance			League		Cup		Continental		Other		Total	
Club	League	Season	Apps	Goals	Apps	Goals	Apps	Goals	Apps	Goals	Apps	Goals
Bulgaria			League		Bulgarian Cup		Europe		Other (Note: Includes Bulgarian Supercup matches.)		Total	
Slavia Sofia	First League	2018–19	13	0	1	0	2	0	0	0	16	0
Total			13	0	1	0	2	0	0	0	16	0
Career statistics			13	0	1	0	2	0	0	0	16	0
