= FC Borislav Parvomay =

Bulgarian football club

Borislav
- Full name: Football Club Borislav Parvomay
- Founded: 1924; 102 years ago
- Ground: Gradski Stadium, Parvomay
- Capacity: 8,000
- Manager: Ivan Dobrevski
- League: South-East Third League
- 2020–21: South-East Third League, 11th
Home colours	Away colours

FC Borislav (Bulgarian: ФК Борислав) is a Bulgarian football club based in Parvomay, Plovdiv Province, which competes in the South-East Third League, the third division of Bulgarian football.

== Current squad ==
As of 1 February 2020 Note: Flags indicate national team as defined under FIFA eligibility rules; some limited exceptions apply. Players may hold more than one non-FIFA nationality.

No.	Pos.	Nation	Player
1	GK	BUL	Mario Uskov
2	DF	BUL	Georgi Staykov
3	DF	BUL	Mihail Mitev
4	DF	BUL	Radoslav Vlashev
5	MF	BUL	Miroslav Kayrakov
6	DF	BUL	Vasil Vasilev
7	MF	BUL	Angel Zdravchev
8	MF	BUL	Erik Smilyanov
10	MF	BUL	Shaban Osmanov

No.	Pos.	Nation	Player
11	MF	BUL	Borimir Karamfilov
12	GK	BUL	Vladislav Dimitrov
13	MF	BUL	Ivan Kirev
15	MF	BUL	Stefan Shopov
16	DF	BUL	Iliya Ivanov
17	FW	BUL	Vasil Kolev
18	FW	BUL	Dimitar Dimitrov
20	DF	BUL	Martin Zdravchev
21	MF	BUL	Nikola Danchev
