= João Amorim (footballer, born February 1992) =

Portuguese footballer

Personal information
- Full name: João Carlos Nogueira Amorim
- Date of birth: 11 February 1992 (age 34)
- Place of birth: Espinho, Portugal
- Height: 1.82 m (6 ft 0 in)
- Position: Midfielder

Team information
- Current team: Florgrade
- Number: 15

Youth career
- 2001–2003: Espinho
- 2003–2011: Porto

Senior career*
Years	Team	Apps	(Gls)
2011–2012	Gondomar	9	(0)
2012–2015	Benfica B	28	(1)
2012–2013	→ Trofense (loan)	31	(3)
2015–2016	Aves	14	(0)
2016–2018	Oliveirense	69	(7)
2018–2019	Varzim	23	(0)
2019	Arda	14	(1)
2020	Feirense	6	(0)
2020–2022	Penafiel	55	(5)
2022–2023	Brașov	9	(0)
2023	Vilafranquense	16	(0)
2023–2024	AVS	16	(0)
2024–2026	Fafe	26	(1)
2026–	Florgrade	4	(0)

International career
2007–2008	Portugal U16	7	(0)
2008–2009	Portugal U17	11	(3)
2009–2010	Portugal U18	6	(1)
2011	Portugal U19	6	(0)
2013	Portugal U21	5	(0)
- * Club domestic league appearances and goals as of 13 September 2026

João Carlos Nogueira Amorim (born 11 February 1992) is a Portuguese professional footballer who plays as a midfielder for Campeonato de Portugal club Florgrade.

He spent most of his career in LigaPro, making over 200 appearances in service of eight clubs.

== Club career ==
Born in Espinho, Amorim joined FC Porto's youth system in 2003, aged 11. He was not given a professional contract after he turned 19, so he signed for Gondomar S.C. in the third division, where he made his senior debut.

Amorim joined S.L. Benfica in February 2012, with the deal being made effective in July. He was immediately loaned to Segunda Liga team C.D. Trofense, a move repeated the following season even though he was eventually called back to Benfica B in December 2013.

On 27 January 2015, Benfica announced that Amorim had signed with division two club C.D. Aves. Eighteen months later, having not played regularly, he dropped down a level to U.D. Oliveirense. In his first season in Oliveira de Azeméis, he featured regularly as they won promotion as runners-up to Real SC, and he kept his place the following year in the second tier.

After playing the first three matches of the 2018–19 campaign, Amorim cancelled his contract in August and found a new team in October in the shape of Varzim S.C. on a two-year deal. After playing most of the remaining games as the side just avoided relegation, he moved abroad for the first time in June 2019 to FC Arda Kardzhali, newcomers in the First Professional Football League (Bulgaria).

Having scored once to equalise in a 2–1 home win over FC Etar 1924 Veliko Tarnovo on 30 September 2019, Amorim returned to his country's second division the following 15 January at C.D. Feirense. He moved again eight months later, on a one-year deal at F.C. Penafiel of the same league.
