= Neno Nenov =

Bulgarian footballer and manager

Personal information
- Date of birth: 14 June 1972 (age 54)
- Place of birth: Bulgaria
- Height: 1.86 m (6 ft 1 in)
- Position: Centre back

Senior career*
Years	Team	Apps	(Gls)
- Chernomoretz Burgas
- Spartak Plovdiv
1998–2001	Slavia Sofia	57	(0)
2003–2004	Spartak Varna	24	(1)
2004–2005	Belasitsa Petrich	25	(1)
2005–2006	Chernomorets Burgas	?	(?)
2006–2007	Spartak Varna	14	(0)
- Balkan Botevgrad
- Dunav Ruse
- Master Burgas
- * Club domestic league appearances and goals

Neno Nenov (Bulgarian: Нено Ненов; born 14 June 1972) is a former Bulgarian footballer and manager.

== Career ==
Nenov began his career with Chernomorets Burgas. He has also represented Slavia Sofia, Belasitsa, Spartak Varna, Balkan and Dunav Ruse.

Nenov has plied his trade almost exclusively in Bulgaria, having a short spell in neighbouring Greece. During his playing days with Balkan, he served as an assistant to manager Miroslav Mironov.

Between 2011 and 2013, he managed Master Burgas.

Nenov is married.
