= Nediljko Kovačević =

Croatian footballer (born 1995)

Personal information
- Date of birth: 16 October 1995 (age 31)
- Place of birth: Split, Croatia
- Height: 1.84 m (6 ft 0 in)
- Positions: Left back; left winger

Team information
- Current team: Jadran Tučepi

Youth career
- Orkan
- –2013: RNK Split
- 2013–2014: Dugopolje
- 2014–2015: Jablonec

Senior career*
| Years | Team | Apps | (Gls) |
| 2015 | Bregenz | 16 | (1) |
| 2016 | Vorwärts Steyr | 11 | (0) |
| 2016–2017 | Schwarz-Weiß Rehden | 0 | (0) |
| 2017–2018 | Kustošija | 5 | (1) |
| 2018 | Koper | 0 | (0) |
| 2019 | Tatran Prešov | 12 | (0) |
| 2019 | Slavia Sofia | 1 | (0) |
| 2020 | Pajde Möhlin | 1 | (0) |
| 2021 | Posušje | | |
| 2021–2022 | VfR Mannheim | | |
| 2022–2024 | Urania | 46 | (15) |
| 2024–2025 | Primorac Stobreč | 24 | (19) |
| 2025–2026 | Urania | 23 | (27) |
| 2026– | Jadran Tučepi | | |
- * Club domestic league appearances and goals as of 09:37, 22 August 2026 (UTC)

Nediljko Kovačević (born 16 October 1995) is a Croatian professional footballer who plays as a left back or left winger for Jadran Tučepi.

== Career ==
Kovačević has previously played for Bregenz and Vorwärts Steyr in Austria, for German sides Schwarz-Weiß Rehden and VfR Mannheim, Croatian outfits Kustošija and Pajde, Koper in Slovenia and Tatran Prešov in Slovakia.
