= Oktay Yusein =

Bulgarian footballer (born 2000)

Personal information
- Full name: Oktay Shenol Yusein
- Date of birth: 15 April 2000 (age 26)
- Place of birth: Krumovgrad, Bulgaria
- Height: 1.72 m (5 ft 8 in)
- Positions: Winger; forward

Team information
- Current team: Krumovgrad
- Number: 77

Youth career
- 2013–2019: Lokomotiv Plovdiv

Senior career*
| Years | Team | Apps | (Gls) |
| 2018–2020 | Lokomotiv Plovdiv | 2 | (0) |
| 2019 | → Strumska Slava (loan) | 5 | (0) |
| 2020 | → Rilski Sportist (loan) | 1 | (1) |
| 2020–2021 | Neftochimic | 12 | (1) |
| 2021– | Krumovgrad | 73 | (3) |
- * Club domestic league appearances and goals as of 30 October 2026

Oktay Yusein (Bulgarian: Октай Юсеин; born 25 July 2000) is a Bulgarian footballer who plays as a winger or forward for Krumovgrad.

== Career ==
Yusein joined Lokomotiv Plovdiv at the age of 13 and progressed through the Lokomotiv academy to become a regular member of the U19 squad.

== Career statistics ==
=== Club ===
As of 1 June 2019

| Club | Season | Division | League | | Cup | | Continental | | Other | | Total | |
| Club | Season | Division | Apps | Goals | Apps | Goals | Apps | Goals | Apps | Goals | Apps | Goals |
|---|---|---|---|---|---|---|---|---|---|---|---|---|
| Lokomotiv Plovdiv | 2018–19 | First League | 2 | 0 | 0 | 0 | – | | – | | 2 | 0 |
| Career total | | | 2 | 0 | 0 | 0 | 0 | 0 | 0 | 0 | 2 | 0 |

== Honours ==
=== Club ===
Lokomotiv Plovdiv

- Bulgarian Cup: 2018–19
