= Philippe van Arnhem =

Dutch footballer (born 1996)

Personal information
- Date of birth: 24 August 1996 (age 30)
- Place of birth: Waalwijk, Netherlands
- Height: 1.78 m (5 ft 10 in)
- Position: Midfielder

Team information
- Current team: Achilles Veen

Youth career
- WSC
- RKC
- Willem II

Senior career*
Years	Team	Apps	(Gls)
2014–2017	RKC	70	(1)
2018–2019	AS Trenčín	31	(1)
2019	Botev Plovdiv	11	(0)
2020–2023	IJsselmeervogels	37	(0)
2023–2024	Kozakken Boys	29	(0)
2024–	Achilles Veen		
- * Club domestic league appearances and goals as of 15:39, 16 November 2024 (UTC)

Philippe van Arnhem (born 24 August 1996) is a Dutch professional footballer who plays as a midfielder for Achilles Veen.

== Club career ==
Van Arnhem joined the RKC/Willem II youth set-up and signed a three-year contract with RKC Waalwijk in 2014. He became the club's youngest ever debutant at 17 in August 2014 when he came on as a sub against Roda JC.

He joined Achilles Veen from fellow amateur side Kozakken Boys in summer 2024.
