= Filip Kolev =

Bulgarian footballer

Personal information
- Full name: Filip Plamenov Kolev
- Date of birth: 29 January 2001 (age 25)
- Place of birth: Plovdiv, Bulgaria
- Height: 1.73 m (5 ft 8 in)
- Position: Midfielder

Youth career
- –2017: Lokomotiv Plovdiv

Senior career*
Years	Team	Apps	(Gls)
2017–2019	Lokomotiv Plovdiv	2	(0)
2019–2020	Spartak Varna	4	(0)
2020–2021	Spartak Plovdiv	19	(7)
2021–2022	Inter Leipzig	23	(13)
2022	Yantra Gabrovo	9	(1)
2022–2023	Lokomotiv Plovdiv II	15	(7)
2023	Spartak Pleven	7	(1)
2023–2024	Asenovets	26	(7)
2024–2025	Maritsa Plovdiv	23	(5)

International career
2019	Bulgaria U18	3	(0)
2019	Bulgaria U19	1	(0)
- * Club domestic league appearances and goals as of 22:19, 8 October 2022 (UTC)

Filip Kolev (Bulgarian: Филип Колев; born 29 January 2001) is a Bulgarian professional footballer who plays as a midfielder for Maritsa Plovdiv.

== Club career ==
Kolev began his career in the local Lokomotiv Plovdiv academy. In the summer of 2017 he was called for the summer camp of the team for the first time. He left the club in 2019 and later joined Spartak Varna. In October 2020 he returned to his local city to join Spartak Plovdiv. On 15 February 2022 he joined Yantra Gabrovo, returning in Bulgaria after a season spent with the German NOFV-Oberliga Süd team Inter Leipzig. He briefly returned to Lokomotiv, but this time for the second team. He spent a half season in Loko II, before leaving for Spartak Pleven in January 2023. On 5 June 2023 he left Spartak Pleven.

In June 2025, he went from PFC Maritsa in the direction of FC Asenovets.

== International career ==
In April 2019 Kolev received his first call up for Bulgaria U18 team for two friendly matches.
