= FC Chernomorets 1919 Burgas =

Bulgarian football club

Chernomorets 1919
- Full name: Football Club Chernomorets 1919 Burgas
- Nickname: Акулите (The Sharks)
- Short name: Chernomorets Burgas
- Founded: 4 August 2015; 11 years ago
- Ground: Lazur Stadium
- Capacity: 18,037
- Chairman: Spasimir Ivanov
- Manager: Angel Stoykov
- League: Second League
- 2025–26: Second League, 6th of 17
- Website: chernomoretz1919.com
Home colours	Away colours

FC Chernomorets 1919 (Bulgarian: ФК Черноморец 1919) is a Bulgarian football club from the city of Burgas, which currently competes in Second League, the second level of Bulgarian football. Chernomorets plays its home matches at the local Lazur Stadium temporary, until they complete the construction of their planned 5,000 seats Ivan Pritargov Stadium.

The club was founded in 2015, following the financial struggles of the former Burgas-based team, PSFC Chernomorets Burgas. Unlike PSFC Chernomorets, however, Chernomorets 1919 is considered to be the official reincarnation of the original club, founded in 1919. The Bulgarian Football Union considers it to be a legitimate successor to the original Chernomorets Burgas, thus it carries all records from the original club. PSFC Chernomorets’ records are kept separate.

== History ==
Following the relegation of PSFC Chernomorets Burgas to the third division and the discoveries that Mitko Sabev drained the club, association "Future for Chernomorets Burgas" wanted a new team to represent the original team FC Chernomorets Burgas who was dissolved in 2006. On 4 August 2015 they officially founded Chernomorets 1919. Zlatko Yankov, who played for Bulgaria at 2 World Cups, and Stoyko Sakaliev were the first players to join the team in advisory roles.

In 2018, the team entered the Third Amateur Football League for the first time. In their first season in the third tier, Chernomorets finished 4th. Chernomorets ended the 2022–23 season in 2nd place but showed a desire to join the Second League, since the group winner, Nesebar, struggled financially. On 19 June 2023 Nesebar announced they will stay in Third League and Bulgarian Football Union announced that Chernomorets will be promoted to Second League, instead. In November 2023, Chernomorets announced the reconstruction of Cherveno Zname Stadium in Dolno Ezerovo neighborhood, with plans for a 5,000-seat stadium, 2 new training fields, and a renaming after their striker Ivan Pritargov.

Chernomorets did not manage to survive in the second tier, suffering immediate relegation to the Third League after the 2023–24 season. They immediately bounced back, however, winning the 2024–25 Southeast Third League and earning a spot in the Second League once more.

== Honours ==
Third League

- Champions (1): 2024–25

== Shirt and sponsors ==
Chernomorets 1919's main colors are blue and white.

Period	Kit manufacturer	Shirt partner
2015–2017	(Bulgaria) Tomy Sport	None
2017–2018	(Bulgaria) Tomy Sport	Efbet
2018–2021	(Bulgaria) Tomy Sport	None
2021–	(Bulgaria) Tomy Sport	WINBET

== Players ==
=== Current squad ===
As of 10 July 2026

Note: Flags indicate national team as defined under FIFA eligibility rules; some limited exceptions apply. Players may hold more than one non-FIFA nationality.

No.	Pos.	Nation	Player
4	MF	BUL	Ivaylo Klimentov
5	DF	POR	Yaya Dramé
6	DF	BUL	Aleks Dimitrov
8	MF	BUL	Emil Yanchev
9	FW	BUL	Zhivko Petkov
10	MF	BUL	Krasian Kolev
11	MF	BUL	Kristian Dobrev
12	GK	BUL	Dimitar Altanov
13	DF	BRA	Wennisson Correia
14	DF	FRA	Julien Maurice
15	GK	BUL	Georgi Argilashki

No.	Pos.	Nation	Player
17	DF	BUL	Mihail Tsonev
19	DF	BUL	Dobromir Pavlov
22	DF	BUL	Stefan Stefanov
23	MF	UKR	Ivan Brikner
24	MF	BUL	Dimitar Stoimenov
30	DF	BUL	Nikolay Zhelyazkov
36	DF	BUL	Aleksandar Valekov
66	MF	BUL	Georgi Staykov
77	FW	BUL	Oktay Hamdiev
96	FW	BUL	Rostislav Kostenski
98	FW	BUL	Valentin Yoskov

For recent transfers, see Transfers winter 2025–26 and Transfers summer 2026.

=== Foreign players ===
Up to twenty foreign nationals can be registered and given a squad number for the first team in the Bulgarian First League, however only five non-EU nationals can be used during a match day. Those non-EU nationals with European ancestry can claim citizenship from the nation their ancestors came from. If a player does not have European ancestry he can claim Bulgarian citizenship after playing in Bulgaria for 5 years.

EU Nationals

- (France) Julien Maurice

EU Nationals (Dual citizenship)

- (Portugal) (Senegal) Yaya Dramé

Non-EU Nationals

- (Brazil) Wennisson Correia
- (Ukraine) Ivan Brikner

== Notable players ==
Had international caps for their respective countries, held any club record, or had more than 100 league appearances. Players whose name is listed in bold represented their countries.

Bulgaria

- (Bulgaria) **Kamen Hadzhiev**
- (Bulgaria) **Kaloyan Krastev**
- (Bulgaria) Zhivko Petkov
- (Bulgaria) **Stoyko Sakaliev**

Africa

- (São Tomé and Príncipe) **Nicola Bragança**

== Managers ==
Name	From	To	Honours
(Bulgaria) Angel Stoykov	June 2015	July 2016	
(Bulgaria) Neno Nenov	July 2016	December 2016	
(Bulgaria) Slavi Kostenski	January 2017	July 2018	
(Bulgaria) Radostin Kishishev	July 2018	November 2019	
(Bulgaria) Slavi Kostenski	November 2019	January 2021	
(Bulgaria) Malin Orachev	January 2021	3 May 2021	
(Bulgaria) Vladimir Valchev	11 August 2021	30 May 2022	
(Bulgaria) Georgi Chilikov	14 July 2022	24 September 2022	
(Bulgaria) Vladimir Valchev (interim)	26 September 2022	11 October 2022	
(Bulgaria) Veselin Velikov	11 October 2022	23 June 2023	
(Bulgaria) Angel Stoykov	1 July 2023	20 October 2025	
(Bulgaria) Ivan Kolev	23 October 2025	24 August 2026	
(Bulgaria) Angel Stoykov	24 August 2026		

== Seasons ==
=== Season statistics ===
Results of league and cup competitions by season
Season	League											Bulgarian Cup	Other competitions		Top goalscorer	
Season	Division	Level	P	W	D	L	F	A	GD	Pts	Pos	Bulgarian Cup	Other competitions		Top goalscorer	
2015–16	B Regional Burgas	5	16	14	1	1	79	9	+70	43	1st ↑	DNE				
2016–17	A Regional Burgas	4	24	16	3	5	75	26	+49	51	3rd	DNQ	Cup of AFL	Q1		
2017–18	A Regional Burgas	4	22	20	2	0	125	16	+109	51	1st ↑	DNQ				
2018–19	Third League	3	24	21	5	8	76	35	+41	68	4th	DNQ	Cup of AFL	Q1	(Bulgaria) Zhulien Parushev	16
2019–20	Third League	3	19	11	3	5	30	19	+11	36	4th	DNQ	Cup of AFL	QF	(Bulgaria) Trayo Grozev	7
2020–21	Third League	3	34	25	6	3	78	22	+56	81	3rd	DNQ	Cup of AFL	Q2		
2021–22	Third League	3	34	19	10	5	53	28	+25	67	4th	DNQ	Cup of AFL	Q2	(Bulgaria) Milen Tanev	16
2022–23	Third League	3	38	24	8	6	82	26	+56	80	2nd ↑	DNQ	Cup of AFL	Q2	(Bulgaria) Grigor Dolapchiev	19
2023–24	Second League	2	34	9	11	14	33	41	-8	38	15th ↓	Round of 32			(Bulgaria) Zhivko Petkov	9
2024–25	Third League	3	38	35	1	2	131	18	+113	106	1st ↑	Round of 32	Cup of AFL	Q3	(Bulgaria) Zhivko Petkov	**36**

==== Key ====
- GS = Group stage
- QF = Quarter-finals
- SF = Semi-finals

Champions	Runners-up	Promoted	Relegated
