= 2018–19 PFC Cherno More Varna season =

Cherno More
2018–19 season
- Chairman: Marin Marinov
- Manager: Ilian Iliev
- Top goalscorer: League: Georgi Iliev (8); All: Georgi Iliev (8)
- Highest home attendance: 6,000 (vs. CSKA Sofia, 16 February 2019)
- Lowest home attendance: 380 (vs. Etar, 30 November 2018)
- Average home league attendance: 1,807
- Biggest win: 4–2 (vs. Vereya, 5 October 2018)
- Biggest defeat: 1–5 (vs. Septemvri Sofia, 4 August 2018 vs. Ludogorets Razgrad, 29 September 2018 vs. Levski Sofia, 12 May 2019)
Home colours	Away colours	Third colours
- All statistics correct as of 7 April 2019.

This page covers all relevant details regarding Cherno More for all official competitions inside the 2018–19 season. These are the First Professional Football League and the Bulgarian Cup.

== Transfers ==
=== In ===
Date	Pos.	Name	From	Fee
14 June 2018	DF	(Bulgaria) Ivaylo Markov	Dunav Ruse	Free
14 June 2018	DF	(Bulgaria) Plamen Dimov	Botev Plovdiv	Free
26 June 2018	MF	(Cape Verde) Patrick Andrade	(Portugal) Moreirense	Free
26 June 2018	FW	(Brazil) Jorginho	(Portugal) Farense	Free
7 August 2018	MF	(Bulgaria) Vasil Panayotov	Levski Sofia	Free

=== Out ===
Date	Pos.	Name	To	Fee
8 May 2018	MF	(Bulgaria) Aleksandar Tsvetkov	Beroe	Free
24 May 2018	DF	(Portugal) Vitinha	(Romania) Unirea Alba Iulia	Free
29 May 2018	FW	(Slovakia) Marek Kuzma	(Poland) Puszcza Niepołomice	Free
29 May 2018	MF	(Portugal) Fábinho	Free agent	End of contract
4 June 2018	MF	(Bulgaria) Nikolay Minkov	CSKA 1948	Free
7 August 2018	DF	(Bulgaria) Daniel Dimov	(Turkey) Boluspor	Free
15 August 2018	MF	(Bulgaria) Mariyan Ognyanov	CSKA 1948	Free

=== Loans in ===
Date	Pos.	Name	From	End date	Fee
3 September 2018	GK	(Bulgaria) Georgi Kitanov	CSKA Sofia	31 December 2018	Free

=== Loans out ===
Date	Pos.	Name	To	End date	Fee
14 June 2018	MF	(Bulgaria) Rumen Kasabov	Chernomorets Balchik	End of season	Free
25 July 2018	DF	(Bulgaria) Ivaylo Markov	Tsarsko Selo	End of season	Free
20 August 2018	FW	(Bulgaria) Valentin Yoskov	Chernomorets Balchik	31 December 2018	Free

== Squad information ==
N	Pos.	Nat.	Name	Age	EU	Since	App	Goals	Ends	Transfer fee	Previous Club	Notes
3	RB	(Bulgaria)	Ertan Tombak	27	EU	2017	4	0	2019	Youth system	Cherno More Academy	
5	RB	(Bulgaria)	Stefan Stanchev	37	EU	2013	103	1	2019	Free	Minyor Pernik	
7	CM	(Cape Verde)	Patrick Andrade	33	EU	2018	4	2	2020	Free	(Portugal) Moreirense	
8	CM	(Bulgaria)	Emil Yanchev	27	EU	2017	12	0	2019	Youth system	Cherno More Academy	
9	LW	(Algeria)	Mehdi Fennouche	33	EU	2018	19	4	2019	Free	Vereya	
10	FW	(Bulgaria)	Radoslav Vasilev	36	EU	2018	21	7	2019	Free	(Cyprus) Alki Oroklini	
11	FW	(Brazil)	Jorginho	38	EU	2018	4	0	2020	Free	(Portugal) Farense	
14	FW	(Bulgaria)	Georgi Bozhilov	39	EU	2017	166	24	2019	Free	Beroe	(Note: Bozhilov made 139 appearances and scored 19 goals during his first spell at the club between 2010 and 2015.)
16	DM	(Bulgaria)	Petar Vitanov	31	EU	2018	22	0	2019	Free	Vereya	
17	RB	(Bulgaria)	Martin Kostadinov	30	EU	2014	37	1	2020	Youth system	Cherno More Academy	
18	RW	(Bulgaria)	Atanas Zehirov	37	EU	2017	37	2	2019	Free	Beroe	
21	CM	(Bulgaria)	Georgi Iliev (captain)	45	EU	2016	295	62	2019	Free	(China) Shijiazhuang Ever Bright	(Note: Iliev made 207 appearances and scored 48 goals during his first two spells at the club between 2000–2003 and 2008–2013.)
22	AM	(Bulgaria)	~~Mariyan Ognyanov~~	30	EU	2017	26	6	2019	Free	Neftochimic	(Note: Player left the club in August 2018.)
23	CB	(Algeria)	Ilias Hassani	31	EU	2017	38	1	2019	Free	Vereya	
25	GK	(Bulgaria)	Ivan Dyulgerov	27	EU	2016	4	0	2019	Youth system	Cherno More Academy	
26	GK	(Bulgaria)	Ivan Dichevski	25	EU	2017	0	0		Youth system	Cherno More Academy	
27	CB	(Bulgaria)	~~Daniel Dimov~~	29	EU	2018	73	4	2018	Free	(Turkey) Manisaspor	(Note: D. Dimov made 54 appearances and scored 3 goals during his first spell at the club between 2006 and 2010.)
31	RW	(Bulgaria)	Lachezar Yordanov	26	EU	2018	1	0		Youth system	Cherno More Academy	
33	CB	(Bulgaria)	Miroslav Enchev	35	EU	2018	11	0	2019	Undisclosed	Vereya	
36	AM	(Bulgaria)	Rumen Kasabov	26	EU	2017	1	1		Youth system	Cherno More Academy	(Note: On loan at Chernomorets Balchik for the entire season.)
36	GK	(Bulgaria)	Georgi Kitanov	31	EU	2018	110	0	2018	Free	CSKA Sofia (loan)	(Note: Kitanov made 110 appearances during his first spell at the club between 2012 and 2016.)
38	LW	(Democratic Republic of the Congo)	Aristote N'Dongala	32	EU	2018	16	0	2019	Free	Lokomotiv GO	
41	LB	(Republic of the Congo)	Hugo Konongo	34	EU	2018	21	0	2019	Free	(France) Paulhan-Pézenas	
44	CB	(Bulgaria)	Ivaylo Markov	29	EU	2018	0	0	2020	Free	Dunav Ruse	(Note: On loan at Tsarsko Selo for the entire season.)
70	CB	(Bulgaria)	Plamen Dimov	36	EU	2018	6	1	2020	Free	Botev Plovdiv	
71	CM	(Bulgaria)	Vasil Panayotov	36	EU	2018	4	0	2020	Free	Levski Sofia	
88	GK	(Bulgaria)	Blagoy Makendzhiev	38	EU	2018	23	0	2020	Free	Pirin Blagoevgrad	
90	FW	(Bulgaria)	Martin Minchev	25	EU	2017	31	2	2020	Youth system	Cherno More Academy	
98	FW	(Bulgaria)	Valentin Yoskov	28	EU	2015	22	0	2019	Youth system	Cherno More Academy	(Note: On loan at Chernomorets Balchik until 31 December 2018.)
99	AM	(Bulgaria)	Dani Kiki	38	EU	2018	14	1	2019	Free	Lokomotiv Plovdiv	

- Last updated: 15 September 2018

== Competitions ==
=== Overall ===
==== Competition record ====
Competition	Started round	Current position/round	Final position/round	First match	Last match	Record							
Competition	Started round	Current position/round	Final position/round	First match	Last match	P	W	D	L	GF	GA	GD	Win %
First League	—	6th		20 July 2018	May 2019	30	13	6	11	38	38	+0	43.33
Bulgarian Cup	First round	—	Quarter-finals	26 September 2018	4 April 2019	3	1	2	0	4	3	+1	33.33
Total						33	14	8	11	42	41	+1	42.42

Updated to match played 21 April 2019
Source: Competitions

==== Summary ====
Clean sheets	12 (11 First League, 1 Bulgarian Cup)
Yellow cards	82 (68 First League, 14 Bulgarian Cup)
Red cards	4 (2 First League, 2 Bulgarian Cup)
Worst discipline	(Bulgaria) Plamen Dimov (9 (yellow card) )
Biggest Win	4–2 vs Vereya (H)
Biggest Defeat	1–5 vs Septemvri Sofia (H), vs Ludogorets Razgrad (A)
Most appearances	(Bulgaria) Georgi Iliev (26)
Top scorer	(Bulgaria) Georgi Iliev (8)

Correct as of match played on 7 April 2019.

=== Pre-season and friendlies ===
The team started pre-season training on June 14. The club has announced 7 friendlies in the summer; one opponent to be confirmed at later stage. On 25 June 2018, the club revealed that the second friendly will be against Gandzasar, the Armenian Cup winners. On 29 August, another friendly with Chernomorets Balchik was announced during the first international break.

22 June 2018 Friendly	Cherno More	4–2	Chernomorets Balchik	Varna
10:30 EEST	Bozhilov 23'; P. Dimov 31'; Yoskov 46'; Yordanov 67'	Report	Iliev 9'; Aleksandrov 26'	Stadium: Mladost

27 June 2018 Friendly	Gandzasar (Armenia)	1–2	(Bulgaria) Cherno More	Bansko
17:00 EEST	56'	Report	Andrade 27'; Yordanov 45'	Stadium: St. Petar

29 June 2018 Friendly	Oleksandriya (Ukraine)	1–1	(Bulgaria) Cherno More	Bansko
17:00 EEST	Protasov 20'	Report	Jorginho 57'	Stadium: Evima Football Fields

4 July 2018 Friendly	Septemvri Sofia	2–2	Cherno More	Bansko
17:00 EEST	49' (pen.); Galchev 110'	Report	Yordanov 13'; Bozhilov 102' (pen.)	Stadium: Evima Football Fields

11 July 2018 Friendly	Cherno More	2–0	Ludogorets Razgrad II	Varna
16:00 EEST	Yoskov 70'; N'Dongala 77' (pen.)	Report		Stadium: Mladost

11 July 2018 Friendly	Cherno More	3–0	Nesebar	Varna
18:30 EEST	Jorginho 22'; Zehirov 42'; Tombak 74'	Report		Stadium: Mladost

14 July 2018 Friendly	Cherno More	6–1	Pomorie	Varna
19:30 EEST	N'Dongala 25', 39'; D. Dimov 30'; Ognyanov 47'; Vitanov 66'; Yoskov 86'	Report	Petkov 43'	Stadium: Ticha

8 September 2018 Friendly	Cherno More	3–1	Chernomorets Balchik	Varna
11:00 EEST	Fennouche 4', 21'; G. Iliev 88'	Report	Yoskov 85'	Stadium: Ticha

=== First Professional League ===
==== Regular season ====
===== Matches =====
20 July 2018 1	Cherno More	2–1	Botev Vratsa	Varna
20:45 EEST	Ivanov 41' (o.g.); Minchev (yellow card) 45+1'; Bozhilov 87'; Hassani (yellow card) 90'	Report	Atanasov 5'; Mihaylov (yellow card) 53'; Ivanov (yellow card) 81'	Stadium: Ticha; Attendance: 1,700; Referee: Volen Chinkov (Sofia); Man of the Match: Georgi Bozhilov

30 July 2018 2	Levski Sofia	2–2	Cherno More	Sofia
20:30 EEST	Belaïd (yellow card) 9'; Kostov 60'; Mariani 89'	Report	Iliev 22'; N'Dongala (yellow card) 43'; Fennouche (yellow card) 53'; Ognyanov (yellow card) 66'; Bozhilov 88'; P. Dimov (yellow card) 90'; Konongo (yellow card)	Stadium: Vivacom Arena - Georgi Asparuhov; Attendance: 2,900; Referee: Georgi Kabakov (Plovdiv); Man of the Match: Georgi Iliev

4 August 2018 3	Cherno More	1–5	Septemvri Sofia	Varna
18:30 EEST	Vitanov (yellow card) 24'; P. Dimov (yellow card) 53' (goal) 69'	Report	Gadi 5', 58', 83' (yellow card) 20'; A. Georgiev (yellow card) 26'; Fabiano (yellow card) 41'; Z. Dimitrov 41' (yellow card) 87'; Galchev (yellow card) 71'; Chandarov 90+5' (pen.)	Stadium: Ticha; Attendance: 1,600; Referee: Nikolay Yordanov (Sofia); Man of the Match: Chris Gadi

10 August 2018 4	Etar	1–1	Cherno More	Veliko Tarnovo
18:15 EEST	K. Stoyanov (yellow card) 3'; Mladenov 9'; Petkov (yellow card) 90+3'	Report	Enchev (yellow card) 7'; Andrade (yellow card) 45'; Andrade 51'; Konongo (yellow card) 59'	Stadium: Ivaylo; Attendance: 850; Referee: Nedelcho Gadzhalov (Plovdiv); Man of the Match: Georgi Iliev

17 August 2018 5	Cherno More	0–0	Beroe	Varna
20:45 EEST	Hassani (yellow card) 5'; Fennouche (yellow card) 63'; Andrade (yellow card) 71'	Report	Tsonev (yellow card) 51'; Alkan (yellow card) 78'; Bandalovski (yellow card) 80'	Stadium: Ticha; Attendance: 1,580; Referee: Stanislav Stavrov (Veliko Tarnovo); Man of the Match: Blagoy Makendzhiev

24 August 2018 6	Lokomotiv Plovdiv	0–2	Cherno More	Plovdiv
21:00 EEST	Eze (yellow card) 39'; Banović (yellow card) 45+1' (yellow-red card) 86'; Eliton (yellow card) 57'; Raykov (yellow card) 90+1'	Report	Andrade 23'; Vasilev 29'; Konongo (yellow card) 31'	Stadium: Lokomotiv; Attendance: 1,350; Referee: Nikola Popov (Sofia); Man of the Match: Radoslav Vasilev

31 August 2018 7	Cherno More	1–0	Vitosha Bistritsa	Varna
21:00 EEST	Milev 3' (o.g.); Vitanov (yellow card) 61'	Report	Milev (yellow card) 4'; Gochev (yellow card) 26'; Todorov (yellow card) 33'; Tsankov (yellow card) 45'	Stadium: Ticha; Attendance: 820; Referee: Petar Kirilov (Dobrich); Man of the Match: Radoslav Vasilev

15 September 2018 8	CSKA Sofia	3–1	Cherno More	Sofia
20:00 EEST	Gyasi 1'; Sekulić (yellow card) 25'; Despodov 39'; Pinto 58'; Lyaskov (yellow card) 88'; Manolev (yellow card) 90+4'	Report	Černiauskas 14' (o.g.); Panayotov (yellow card) 43'; Hassani (yellow card) 90+4'; Makendzhiev (yellow card) 90+4'	Stadium: Balgarska Armia; Attendance: 3,480; Referee: Stefan Apostolov (Simitli); Man of the Match: Kiril Despodov

23 September 2018 9	Cherno More	1–2	Slavia Sofia	Varna
17:30 EEST	Vasilev (yellow card) 31' (yellow-red card) 73'; Minchev 38'; Vitanov (yellow card) 58'; Hassani (yellow card) 63'	Report	Chunchukov 13'; Gamakov (yellow card) 14'; G. Ivanov 46' (yellow card) 60'; Hristov (yellow card) 53'; Tsvetanov (yellow card) 78'	Stadium: Ticha; Attendance: 1,200; Referee: Volen Chinkov (Sofia); Man of the Match: Galin Ivanov

29 September 2018 10	Ludogorets Razgrad	5–1	Cherno More	Razgrad
20:00 EEST	Wanderson 12'; Keșerü 47', 71'; Bakalov 48'; Marcelinho 62'	Report	N'Dongala 55'	Stadium: Ludogorets Arena; Attendance: 700; Referee: Nikola Popov (Sofia); Man of the Match: Dimo Bakalov

5 October 2018 11	Cherno More	4–2	Vereya	Varna
20:00 EEST	Iliev 24'; Bozhilov 27', 71'; Minchev (yellow card) 46'; Vasilev 48'; Enchev (yellow card) 69'	Report	Malek (yellow card) 33'; Vušurović 80'; Malamov 89'; Jørgensen (yellow card) 90+1'	Stadium: Ticha; Attendance: 1,100; Referee: Georgi Ivanov (Sofia); Man of the Match: Georgi Iliev

20 October 2018 12	Botev Plovdiv	2–1	Cherno More	Plovdiv
17:15 EEST	Vutov 22'; Petkov 52'	Report	Andrade (yellow card) 30'; Hassani (yellow card) 54'; Minchev 72'	Stadium: Botev 1912 Football Complex; Attendance: 900; Referee: Georgi Davidov (Veliko Tarnovo); Man of the Match: Antonio Vutov

26 October 2018 13	Cherno More	3–2	Dunav Ruse	Varna
17:30 EET	Iliev 9', 82'; Enchev 32'; Konongo (yellow card) 59'; Panayotov (yellow card) 88'	Report	Hassani 2' (o.g.); A. Aleksandrov (yellow card) 67'; Petrov (yellow card) 76'; Isa 78'; Popadiyn (yellow card) 85'; Kovachev (yellow card) 90'	Stadium: Ticha; Attendance: 700; Referee: Petar Kirilov (Dobrich); Man of the Match: Georgi Iliev

4 November 2018 14	Botev Vratsa	2–1	Cherno More	Montana
12:30 EET	Gadzhalov (yellow card) 27'; Nenov 60'; Bojinov 64'	Report	P. Dimov (yellow card) 45'; Stanchev (yellow card) 50'; Panayotov (yellow card) 52'; Jorginho 71'; Andrade (yellow card) 76'	Stadium: Ogosta; Attendance: 340; Referee: Stanislav Todorov (Shumen); Man of the Match: Valeri Bojinov

10 November 2018 15	Cherno More	1–0	Levski Sofia	Varna
15:00 EET	Jorginho 22'; Vitanov (yellow card) 41'; Fennouche (yellow card) 49'; M. Kostadinov (yellow card) 66'; Andrade (yellow card) 81'	Report	Paulinho (yellow card) 33'; Reis (yellow card) 47'; Cabral (yellow card) 68' (yellow-red card) 69'; Jablonský (yellow card) 78'	Stadium: Ticha; Attendance: 4,800; Referee: Nikolay Yordanov (Sofia); Man of the Match: Jorginho

24 November 2018 16	Septemvri Sofia	2–1	Cherno More	Sofia
12:30 EET	Stoyanov (yellow card) 31'; Galchev 65'; Baidoo 81'	Report	Genev (yellow card) 45'; Jorginho 54' (yellow card) 69'; Enchev (yellow card) 64'; Konongo (yellow card) 82'	Stadium: Vasil Levski; Attendance: 50; Referee: Vladimir Valkov (Plovdiv); Man of the Match: Boris Galchev

30 November 2018 17	Cherno More	1–0	Etar	Varna
17:30 EET	Vasilev 63'	Report	K. Stoyanov (yellow card) 45'	Stadium: Ticha; Attendance: 380; Referee: Stanislav Todorov (Shumen); Man of the Match: Radoslav Vasilev

4 December 2018 18	Beroe	0–1	Cherno More	Stara Zagora
15:00 EET		Report	Konongo (yellow card) 14'; Genev 34'; Andrade (yellow card) 56'; Kitanov (yellow card) 83'	Stadium: Beroe; Attendance: 350; Referee: Stanislav Stavrov (Veliko Tarnovo); Man of the Match: Viktor Genev

8 December 2018 19	Cherno More	2–0	Lokomotiv Plovdiv	Varna
12:30 EET	Iliev 6' (pen.); P. Dimov (yellow card) 36'; Kiki 42'; Vasilev (yellow card) 86'	Report	Vezalov (yellow card) 39'; Bouhna (yellow card) 74'	Stadium: Ticha; Attendance: 950; Referee: Georgi Davidov (Veliko Tarnovo); Man of the Match: Georgi Iliev

15 December 2018 20	Vitosha Bistritsa	1–1	Cherno More	Bistritsa
12:30 EET	Gochev (yellow card) 33'; Milchev (yellow card) 60'; Lazarov 72'	Report	Iliev 20'	Stadium: Bistritsa; Attendance: 170; Referee: Nikolay Yordanov (Sofia); Man of the Match: Ivaylo Lazarov

16 February 2019 21	Cherno More	2–0	CSKA Sofia	Varna
15:00 EET	N'Dongala 8' (yellow card) 9'; Panayotov (yellow card) 21' (yellow-red card) 80'; Panov (yellow card) 30'; Genev (yellow card) 39'; Vasilev 62'; Vitanov (yellow card) 63'; P. Dimov (yellow card) 89'	Report	Pinto (yellow card) 27'; Chorbadzhiyski (yellow card) 57'; Evandro (yellow card) 66'; Malinov (yellow card) 85'; Bikel (yellow card) 90'	Stadium: Ticha; Attendance: 6,000; Referee: Stefan Apostolov (Simitli); Man of the Match: Martin Minchev

19 February 2019 22	Slavia Sofia	3–2	Cherno More	Sofia
12:30 EET	Chunchukov 9'; Uzunov (yellow card) 59'; Kirilov 81', 90+2'	Report	Panov 33' (yellow card) 76'; Kiki 44'	Stadium: Slavia; Attendance: 330; Referee: Valentin Zhelezov (Burgas); Man of the Match: Radoslav Kirilov

23 February 2019 23	Cherno More	1–0	Ludogorets Razgrad	Varna
15:00 EET	Genev 13'; Enchev (yellow card) 24'; P. Dimov (yellow card) 52'; Vitanov (yellow card) 59'; Panov (yellow card) 90+2'; Kiki (yellow card) 90+3'	Report	Grigore (yellow card) 12'; Bakalov (yellow card) 40'; Keșerü (yellow card) 90'	Stadium: Ticha; Attendance: 850; Referee: Nikola Popov (Sofia); Man of the Match: Viktor Genev

1 March 2019 24	Vereya	0–2	Cherno More	Stara Zagora
17:30 EET	Dobrovolskyi (yellow card) 32'; Ryustemov (yellow card) 62'; I. Ivanov (red card) 86'	Report	Iliev 28'; Vasilev (yellow card) 45+1' (goal) 63'; Kiki (yellow card) 71'	Stadium: Trace Arena; Attendance: 120; Referee: Radoslav Gidzhenov (Plovdiv); Man of the Match: Radoslav Vasilev

10 March 2019 25	Cherno More	0–0	Botev Plovdiv	Varna
15:00 EET	P. Dimov (yellow card) 89'	Report	Baltanov (yellow card) 25'; Doré (yellow card) 65'; Karachanakov (yellow card) 72'; Zehirov (yellow card) 83'; Terziev (yellow card) 85'	Stadium: Ticha; Attendance: 1,600; Referee: Valentin Zhelezov (Burgas); Man of the Match: Daniel Kajzer

17 March 2019 26	Dunav Ruse	1–1	Cherno More	Ruse
15:00 EET	Vasev 20' (pen.); M. Kovachev (yellow card) 27'; S. Kovachev (yellow card) 49'; Isaevski (yellow card) 77'; Inkoom (yellow card) 90+3'	Report	Iliev 28' (pen.) (yellow card) 35'	Stadium: Gradski; Attendance: 1,000; Referee: Petar Kirilov (Dobrich); Man of the Match: Georgi Iliev

===== League table =====
Pos	Team	Pld	W	D	L	GF	GA	GD	Pts	Qualification
3	Levski Sofia	26	17	3	6	51	24	+27	54	Qualification for the Championship round
4	Botev Plovdiv	26	13	6	7	39	21	+18	45	Qualification for the Championship round
5	Cherno More	26	12	6	8	36	34	+2	42	Qualification for the Championship round
6	Beroe	26	12	6	8	32	23	+9	42	Qualification for the Championship round
7	Etar	26	12	4	10	30	27	+3	40	Qualification for the Relegation round

Source: Soccerway
Rules for classification: 1) Points; 2) Head-to-head points; 3) Head-to-head goal difference; 4) Head-to-head goals scored; 5) Head-to-head away goals scored (only if two teams); 6) Goal difference; 7) Goals scored; 8) Fairplay ranking; 9) Draw.

===== Results summary =====
Overall								Home						Away					
Pld	W	D	L	GF	GA	GD	Pts	W	D	L	GF	GA	GD	W	D	L	GF	GA	GD
26	12	6	8	36	34	+2	42	9	2	2	19	12	+7	3	4	6	17	22	−5

Last updated: 1 March 2019.
Source: bulgarian-football.com

===== League performance =====
Round	1	2	3	4	5	6	7	8	9	10	11	12	13	14	15	16	17	18	19	20	21	22	23	24	25	26
Ground	H	A	H	A	H	A	H	A	H	A	H	A	H	A	H	A	H	A	H	A	H	A	H	A	H	A
Result	W	D	L	D	D	W	W	L	L	L	W	L	W	L	W	L	W	W	W	D	W	L	W	W	D	D
Position	2	2	9	8	8	5	5	6	7	9	7	8	7	7	6	7	6	6	6	6	6	6	6	6	6	5

Source: bulgarian-football.com
A = Away; H = Home; W = Win; D = Draw; L = Loss

==== Championship stage ====
===== Matches =====
30 March 2019 27	CSKA Sofia	1–0	Cherno More	Sofia
19:30 EET	Atanasov (yellow card) 22'; Bikel (yellow card) 48'; Sowe 83' (pen.)	Report	Stanchev (yellow card) 19'; Fennouche (yellow card) 22'; P. Dimov (yellow card) 82'; Vasilev (yellow card) 85'; Genev (yellow card) 87'	Stadium: Balgarska Armia; Attendance: 2,400; Referee: Stefan Apostolov (Simitli); Man of the Match: Henrique

7 April 2019 28	Cherno More	0–1	Levski Sofia	Varna
16:30 EET	Andrade (yellow card) 60'; Vasilev (yellow card) 87'	Report	Kostov 16'; Reis (yellow card) 18'; Thiam (yellow card) 41'; Nganioni (yellow card) 70' (yellow-red card) 83'; Milanov (yellow card) 90+3'	Stadium: Ticha; Attendance: 4,200; Referee: Vladimir Valkov (Plovdiv); Man of the Match: Stanislav Kostov

13 April 2019 29	Botev Plovdiv	0–2	Cherno More	Plovdiv
17:30 EET		Report	Andrade 83', 88'	Stadium: Botev 1912 Football Complex; Attendance: 1,200; Referee: Georgi Davidov (Veliko Tarnovo); Man of the Match: Patrick Andrade

21 April 2019 30	Beroe	2–0	Cherno More	Stara Zagora
20:00 EET	Eugénio 6'; Bandalovski 28'; Tsvetkov (yellow card) 43'; A. Vasilev (yellow card) 57' (yellow-red card) 62'	Report	Enchev (yellow card) 53' (yellow-red card) 87'	Stadium: Beroe; Attendance: 1,100; Referee: Petar Kirilov (Dobrich); Man of the Match: Ivan Bandalovski

26 April 2019 31	Cherno More	2–1	Ludogorets Razgrad	Varna
18:15 EET	G. Iliev 20', 52'; Andrade (yellow card) 23'; Stanchev (yellow card) 80'	Report	Grigore 34'; Cicinho (yellow card) 47'; Świerczok (yellow card) 87'	Stadium: Ticha; Attendance: 1,600; Referee: Nikolay Yordanov (Sofia); Man of the Match: Georgi Iliev

4 May 2019 32	Cherno More	1–3	CSKA Sofia	Varna
17:30 EET	Konongo (yellow card) 17'; Panayotov 67'; Stanchev (yellow card) 90+2'	Report	Bodurov (yellow card) 21'; Geferson (yellow card) 31'; Tiago 33' (yellow card) 87'; Gyasi 52'; Sowe 75'	Stadium: Ticha; Referee: Vladimir Valkov (Plovdiv); Man of the Match: Tiago Rodrigues

12 May 2019 33	Levski Sofia	5–1	Cherno More	Sofia
19:00 EET	Kostov 16', 46'; Paulinho 19'; Mariani 31'; S. Ivanov 83'	Report	P. Dimov (yellow card) 44'; Vitanov (yellow card) 64'; Kiki 86'; Stanchev (yellow card) 88'	Stadium: Vivacom Arena - Georgi Asparuhov; Referee: Ivaylo Stoyanov (Petrich); Man of the Match: Stanislav Kostov

18 May 2019 34	Cherno More	1–0	Botev Plovdiv	Varna
15:30 EET	Kiki 2'; Andrade (yellow card) 85'	Report	Vutov (yellow card) 53'	Stadium: Ticha; Attendance: 750; Referee: Georgi Davidov (Veliko Tarnovo); Man of the Match: Dani Kiki

21 May 2019 35	Cherno More	0–0	Beroe	Varna
21:00 EET	Panayotov (yellow card) 82'; Enchev (yellow card) 90+4'	Report		Stadium: Ticha; Attendance: 320; Referee: Georgi Kabakov (Plovdiv); Man of the Match: Dušan Perniš

24 May 2019 36	Ludogorets Razgrad	4–1	Cherno More	Razgrad
20:00 EET	Bakalov 10'; Świerczok 33', 58', 71' (yellow card) 49'; Nedyalkov (yellow card) 80'; Cicinho (yellow card) 88'	Report	Jorginho 23'; Andrade (yellow card) 55'; Stanchev (yellow card) 60'	Stadium: Ludogorets Arena; Attendance: 6,200; Referee: Volen Chinkov (Sofia); Man of the Match: Jakub Świerczok

===== League table =====
Pos	Team	Pld	W	D	L	GF	GA	GD	Pts	Qualification	LUD	CSK	LEV	BSZ	CHM	BOT
1	Ludogorets Razgrad (C)	36	23	10	3	67	19	+48	79	Qualification for the Champions League first qualifying round	—	0–0	1–1	0–0	4–1	3–0
2	CSKA Sofia	36	24	6	6	57	17	+40	78	Qualification for the Europa League first qualifying round	0–0	—	0–0	2–0	1–0	1–0
3	Levski Sofia (O)	36	20	6	10	64	37	+27	66	Qualification for the European play-off final	0–2	0–2	—	1–2	5–1	1–1
4	Beroe	36	16	10	10	42	30	+12	58		1–1	0–1	3–1	—	2–0	1–1
5	Cherno More	36	15	7	14	44	51	−7	52		2–1	1–3	0–1	0–0	—	1–0
6	Botev Plovdiv	36	14	8	14	44	36	+8	50		0–2	2–0	1–3	0–1	0–2	—

Source: Soccerway
Legend: Blue = home team win; Yellow = draw; Red = away team win.
Rules for classification: 1) Points; 2) Head-to-head points; 3) Head-to-head goal difference; 4) Head-to-head goals scored; 5) Head-to-head away goals scored (only if two teams); 6) Goal difference; 7) Goals scored; 8) Fairplay ranking; 9) Draw.
(C) Champions; (O) Play-off winners

===== Results summary =====
Overall								Home						Away					
Pld	W	D	L	GF	GA	GD	Pts	W	D	L	GF	GA	GD	W	D	L	GF	GA	GD
10	3	1	6	8	17	−9	10	2	1	2	4	5	−1	1	0	4	4	12	−8

Last updated: 24 May 2019.
Source: bulgarian-football.com

===== League performance =====
Round	1	2	3	4	5	6	7	8	9	10
Ground	A	H	A	A	H	H	A	H	H	A
Result	L	L	W	L	W	L	L	W	D	L
Position	6	6	5	6	6	6	6	5	5	5

Updated to match(es) played on 24 May 2019. Source: bulgarian-football.com
A = Away; H = Home; W = Win; D = Draw; L = Loss

=== Bulgarian Cup ===
26 September 2018 1st round	Arda	0–1	Cherno More	Kardzhali
16:00 EEST	Bengyuzov (yellow card) 34'; Hristov (yellow card) 70'	Report	Hassani (yellow card) 5'; Iliev (yellow card) 16'; Bozhilov (yellow card) 34'; Fennouche 51' (yellow card) 54' (yellow-red card) 78'; Kitanov (yellow card) 56'	Stadium: Druzhba; Attendance: 2,300; Referee: Ryustem Karagaren (Asenovgrad)

31 October 2018 2nd round	Cherno More	2–2 (a.e.t.) (5−4 p)	Levski Sofia	Varna
16:00 EEST	Zehirov 12' (yellow card) 36'; Iliev (yellow card) 31'; Vasilev (yellow card) 74'; Enchev (yellow card) 83'; Bozhilov 90+1'; Minchev (yellow card) 91'; Hassani (red card) after FT'	Report	Cabral 10'; Reis (yellow card) 17'; Cvetković (yellow card) 33'; Jablonský (yellow card) 58'; Thiam 78'; Obertan (yellow card) 85'; Naydenov (yellow card) 107'; Rivaldinho (red card) after FT'	Stadium: Ticha; Attendance: 3,900; Referee: Ivaylo Stoyanov (Petrich)
	Penalties
	G. Iliev (penalty scored); Bozhilov (penalty missed); Panayotov (penalty scored); Vasilev (penalty scored); Andrade (penalty scored); P. Dimov (penalty scored)		(penalty scored) Cabral; (penalty scored) Jablonský; (penalty scored) Cvetković; (penalty scored) Thiam; (penalty missed) Nascimento; (penalty missed) Reis

4 April 2019 Quarter-finals	Botev Plovdiv	1–1 (a.e.t.) (3−1 p)	Cherno More	Plovdiv
17:30 EET	Doré 52'	Report	P. Dimov (yellow card) 66'; Minchev 79' (yellow card) 118'; Kitanov (yellow card) 97'; Andrade (yellow card) 97'	Stadium: Botev 1912 Football Complex; Attendance: 3,100; Referee: Stanislav Todorov (Shumen)
	Penalties
	Nedelev (penalty scored); Pirgov (penalty scored); Vutov (penalty scored)		Andrade (penalty scored); P. Dimov (penalty missed); Panayotov (penalty missed); Kiki (penalty missed)

== Statistics ==
=== Player appearances ===
Key:
‡ On loan from another club * First appearance(s) for the club

- # = Squad number
- **Pos** = Playing position
- **P** = Number of games played
- **G** = Number of goals scored
- **GK** = Goalkeeper
- **DF** = Defender
- **MF** = Midfielder
- **FW** = Forward
- = Yellow cards
- = Red cards
- † Permanent player left club during the season
- ¤ Loaned to another club for part or all of season

Correct as of 15 August 2018. Starting appearances are listed first, followed by substitute appearances in parentheses where applicable.

No.	Pos	Name	P	G	P	G	P	G	A yellow card	A red card	Notes
No.	Pos	Name	League		Bulgarian Cup		Total		Discipline		Notes
3	DF	(Bulgaria) Ertan Tombak	0	0	0	0	0	0	0	0	
5	DF	(Bulgaria) Stefan Stanchev	2	0	0	0	2	0	0	0	
7	MF	(Cape Verde) Patrick Andrade	4	2	0	0	4	2	2	0	
8	MF	(Bulgaria) Emil Yanchev	0(1)	0	0	0	0(1)	0	0	0	
9	MF	(Algeria) Mehdi Fennouche	6	0	0	0	6	0	2	0	
10	FW	(Bulgaria) Radoslav Vasilev	3(2)	1	0	0	3(2)	1	0	0	
11	FW	(Brazil) Jorginho	4	0	0	0	4	0	0	0	
14	FW	(Bulgaria) Georgi Bozhilov	1(6)	2	0	0	1(6)	2	0	0	
16	MF	(Bulgaria) Petar Vitanov	8	0	0	0	8	0	1	0	
17	DF	(Bulgaria) Martin Kostadinov	1	0	0	0	1	0	0	0	
18	MF	(Bulgaria) Atanas Zehirov	1(4)	0	0	0	1(4)	0	0	0	
21	MF	(Bulgaria) Georgi Iliev (c)	6(2)	1	0	0	6(2)	1	0	0	
22	MF	(Bulgaria) Mariyan Ognyanov †	0(2)	0	0	0	0(2)	0	1	0	
23	DF	(Algeria) Ilias Hassani	6	0	0	0	6	0	3	0	
25	GK	(Bulgaria) Ivan Dyulgerov	0	0	0	0	0	0	0	0	
26	GK	(Bulgaria) Ivan Dichevski	0	0	0	0	0	0	0	0	
27	DF	(Bulgaria) Daniel Dimov †	3	0	0	0	3	0	0	0	
31	MF	(Bulgaria) Lachezar Yordanov	0	0	0	0	0	0	0	0	
33	DF	(Bulgaria) Miroslav Enchev	5	0	0	0	5	0	1	0	
36	MF	(Bulgaria) Rumen Kasabov ¤	0	0	0	0	0	0	0	0	
36	GK	(Bulgaria) Georgi Kitanov ‡	0	0	0	0	0	0	0	0	
38	MF	(Democratic Republic of the Congo) Aristote N'Dongala	8	0	0	0	8	0	1	0	
41	DF	(Republic of the Congo) Hugo Konongo	8	0	0	0	8	0	3	0	
44	DF	(Bulgaria) Ivaylo Markov ¤	0	0	0	0	0	0	0	0	
70	DF	(Bulgaria) Plamen Dimov	6	1	0	0	6	1	2	0	
71	MF	(Bulgaria) Vasil Panayotov	2(2)	0	0	0	2(2)	0	1	0	
88	GK	(Bulgaria) Blagoy Makendzhiev	8	0	0	0	8	0	1	0	
90	FW	(Bulgaria) Martin Minchev	2(3)	0	0	0	2(3)	0	1	0	
98	FW	(Bulgaria) Valentin Yoskov ¤	0(1)	0	0	0	0(1)	0	0	0	
99	MF	(Bulgaria) Dani Kiki	4(1)	0	0	0	4(1)	0	0	0	

=== Minutes on the pitch ===
Includes injury time. Positions indicate the most natural position of the particular player, followed by alternative positions where he actually started games during the course of the season.

No.	Position	Alternative Position(s)	Player	First League	Bulgarian Cup	Total
3	RB		(Bulgaria) Ertan Tombak	0	0	0
5	RB		(Bulgaria) Stefan Stanchev	173	0	173
7	CM		(Cape Verde) Patrick Andrade	250	0	250
8	CM		(Bulgaria) Emil Yanchev	22	0	22
9	LW		(Algeria) Mehdi Fennouche	519	0	519
10	FW		(Bulgaria) Radoslav Vasilev	362	0	362
11	FW		(Brazil) Jorginho	269	0	269
14	FW	AM	(Bulgaria) Georgi Bozhilov	197	0	197
16	DM		(Bulgaria) Petar Vitanov	661	0	661
17	RB		(Bulgaria) Martin Kostadinov	94	0	94
18	RW	RB	(Bulgaria) Atanas Zehirov	200	0	200
21	CM	AM	(Bulgaria) Georgi Iliev	576	0	576
22	AM		(Bulgaria) Mariyan Ognyanov	79	0	79
23	CB		(Algeria) Ilias Hassani	568	0	568
25	GK		(Bulgaria) Ivan Dyulgerov	0	0	0
26	GK		(Bulgaria) Ivan Dichevski	0	0	0
27	CB		(Bulgaria) Daniel Dimov	285	0	285
31	RW		(Bulgaria) Lachezar Yordanov	0	0	0
33	CB	RB	(Bulgaria) Miroslav Enchev	474	0	474
36	AM		(Bulgaria) Rumen Kasabov	0	0	0
36	GK		(Bulgaria) Georgi Kitanov	0	0	0
38	LW	RW	(Democratic Republic of the Congo) Aristote N'Dongala	750	0	750
41	LB		(Republic of the Congo) Hugo Konongo	759	0	759
44	CB		(Bulgaria) Ivaylo Markov	0	0	0
70	CB		(Bulgaria) Plamen Dimov	571	0	571
71	CM		(Bulgaria) Vasil Panayotov	264	0	264
88	GK		(Bulgaria) Blagoy Makendzhiev	759	0	759
90	FW	LW	(Bulgaria) Martin Minchev	232	0	232
98	FW		(Bulgaria) Valentin Yoskov	17	0	17
99	AM	LW	(Bulgaria) Dani Kiki	268	0	268

Correct as of match played on 15 September 2018.

=== Goalscorers ===
Rank	Pos.	Player	L	C	Total
1	FW	(Bulgaria) Georgi Bozhilov	2	0	2
1	MF	(Cape Verde) Patrick Andrade	2	0	2
2	MF	(Bulgaria) Georgi Iliev	1	0	1
2	DF	(Bulgaria) Plamen Dimov	1	0	1
2	FW	(Bulgaria) Radoslav Vasilev	1	0	1
Own goals			3	0	3
**Totals**			**10**	**0**	10

Last updated: 15 September 2018

=== Clean sheets ===
R	No.	Nat	Goalkeeper	L	C	Total
1	88	(Bulgaria)	Blagoy Makendzhiev	3	–	**3**
			**Totals**	**3**	**0**	**3**

Last updated: 31 August 2018

=== Own goals ===
Own goals in favour
Date	Pos.	Player	Opponent	Competition
20 Jul	DF	(Bulgaria) Mariyan Ivanov	Botev Vratsa	First League
31 Aug	FW	(Bulgaria) Nasko Milev	Vitosha Bistritsa	First League
15 Sept	GK	(Lithuania) Vytautas Černiauskas	CSKA Sofia	First League

Own goals conceded
Date	Pos.	Player	Opponent	Competition

=== Man of the Match performances ===
Ranking	Squad Number	Position	Player	Round	Opponent	Total
1	21	MF	(Bulgaria) Georgi Iliev	2	Levski Sofia (A)	2
1	21	MF	(Bulgaria) Georgi Iliev	4	Etar (A)	2
1	10	FW	(Bulgaria) Radoslav Vasilev	6	Lokomotiv Plovdiv (A)	2
1	10	FW	(Bulgaria) Radoslav Vasilev	7	Vitosha Bistritsa (H)	2
2	14	FW	(Bulgaria) Georgi Bozhilov	1	Botev Vratsa (H)	1
2	88	GK	(Bulgaria) Blagoy Makendzhiev	5	Beroe (H)	1

Last updated: 31 August 2018
Source: Match reports in Competitions, Gong.bg Man of the Match Awards

=== Disciplinary record ===
Correct as of 15 September 2018
Players are listed in descending order of (yellow card)
Players with the same amount of cards are listed by their position on the club's official website

**R.**	**No.**	**Nat**	**Pos**	**Name**	**First League**			**Bulgarian Cup**			**Total**		
**R.**	**No.**	**Nat**	**Pos**	**Name**	Yellow card	(yellow card) (yellow-red card)	Red card	Yellow card	(yellow card) (yellow-red card)	Red card	Yellow card	(yellow card) (yellow-red card)	Red card
1	23	(Algeria)	DF	Ilias Hassani	3	0	0	0	0	0	3	0	0
1	41	(Republic of the Congo)	DF	Hugo Konongo	3	0	0	0	0	0	3	0	0
2	7	(Cape Verde)	MF	Patrick Andrade	2	0	0	0	0	0	2	0	0
2	9	(Algeria)	MF	Mehdi Fennouche	2	0	0	0	0	0	2	0	0
2	70	(Bulgaria)	DF	Plamen Dimov	2	0	0	0	0	0	2	0	0
3	16	(Bulgaria)	MF	Petar Vitanov	1	0	0	0	0	0	1	0	0
3	22	(Bulgaria)	MF	Mariyan Ognyanov	1	0	0	0	0	0	1	0	0
3	33	(Bulgaria)	DF	Miroslav Enchev	1	0	0	0	0	0	1	0	0
3	38	(Democratic Republic of the Congo)	MF	Aristote N'Dongala	1	0	0	0	0	0	1	0	0
3	71	(Bulgaria)	MF	Vasil Panayotov	1	0	0	0	0	0	1	0	0
3	88	(Bulgaria)	GK	Blagoy Makendzhiev	1	0	0	0	0	0	1	0	0
3	90	(Bulgaria)	FW	Martin Minchev	1	0	0	0	0	0	1	0	0
				**TOTALS**	**19**	**0**	**0**	**0**	**0**	**0**	**19**	**0**	**0**

==== Suspensions served ====
Date	Matches Missed	Player	Reason	Opponents Missed

=== Injuries ===
Players in bold are still out from their injuries.
Players listed will/have miss(ed) at least one competitive game (missing from whole match day squad).

Date	No.	Pos.	Name	Injury	Note	Recovery time	Games missed	Source
24 May	10	FW	(Bulgaria) Radoslav Vasilev	Ankle injury	Occurred during match against Levski Sofia (previous season).	Exact time unknown	3	
29 June	17	DF	(Bulgaria) Martin Kostadinov	ARS complex	Occurred during pre-season friendly against Oleksandriya.	Exact time unknown	3	
20 July	23	DF	(Algeria) Ilias Hassani	Ankle injury	Occurred during match against Botev Vratsa.	1 week	1	
28 July	98	FW	(Bulgaria) Valentin Yoskov	Unspecified injury	Occurred during training.	Exact time unknown	2	
28 July	3	DF	(Bulgaria) Ertan Tombak	Unspecified injury	Occurred during training.	Exact time unknown	2	
30 July	5	DF	(Bulgaria) Stefan Stanchev	Strain	Occurred during match against Levski Sofia.	1 month	5	
16 August	17	DF	(Bulgaria) Martin Kostadinov	Thigh injury	Occurred during training.	1 week	1	
24 August	7	MF	(Cape Verde) **Patrick Andrade**	Knee injury	Occurred during match against Lokomotiv Plovdiv.	2 weeks	2	
13 September	8	MF	(Bulgaria) **Emil Yanchev**	Virus	Occurred during training.	1 week	1	

=== Home attendances ===
Correct as of match played on 31 August 2018.
Win Draw Loss Void

Comp	Date	Score	Opponent	Attendance
First League	20 July 2018	2–1	Botev Vratsa	1,700
First League	4 August 2018	1–5	Septemvri Sofia	1,600
First League	17 August 2018	0–0	Beroe	1,580
First League	31 August 2018	1–0	Vitosha Bistritsa	820
			**Total attendance**	**5,700**
			**Total league attendance**	**5,700**
			**Average attendance**	**1,425**
			**Average league attendance**	**1,425**

Source: Match reports in Competitions

== Club ==
=== Coaching staff ===
Position	Staff
Manager	(Bulgaria) Ilian Iliev
Assistant First-team coach	(Bulgaria) Petar Kostadinov
Goalkeeper coach	(Bulgaria) Boyan Peykov
Club doctor	(Bulgaria) Dr. Stefan Petrov
Kinesiotherapist	(Bulgaria) Viktor Bumbalov
Masseur	(Bulgaria) Marin Dimov
Host	(Bulgaria) Nikolay Pachkov

Last updated: 1 June 2018
Source: Cherno More

=== Other information ===
Chief Executive Officer	(Bulgaria) Marin Marinov
Chief Technical Officer	(Bulgaria) Todor Velikov
Technical Assistant	(Bulgaria) Nikolay Kirchev
Press Officer	(Bulgaria) Ivaylo Borisov
Security Director	(Bulgaria) Boris Kostadinov
Ground (capacity and dimensions)	Ticha Stadium (12,500 / 103x67 metres)

Updated to match played 1 June 2018
Source: Cherno More
