= 2019–20 PFC Cherno More Varna season =

Cherno More
2019–20 season
- Chairman: Marin Marinov
- Manager: Ilian Iliev
- Stadium: Ticha
Home colours	Away colours	Third colours

The 2019-20 season is Cherno More's 56th season in the top flight since the establishment of the league in 1948 and the 19th consecutive one. On 13 March, the league was suspended for a month due to the ongoing coronavirus pandemic in Bulgaria.

== First Professional Football League ==
=== Regular season ===
14 July 2019 Round 1	Cherno More	3–1	Lokomotiv Plovdiv	Varna
	Ndongala 30'; Enchev (yellow card) 50'; Isa 53'; Rodrigo (yellow card) 61'; Andrade (yellow card) 66'; D. Iliev 70' (o.g.)	Report	Aralica 16' (yellow card) 50'; Tsvetanov (yellow card) 62'; Eliton Junior (yellow card) 69'	Stadium: Ticha; Attendance: 1,300; Referee: Nikola Popov

20 July 2019 Round 2	CSKA Sofia	1–3	Cherno More	Sofia
	Evandro (yellow card) 27'; Atanasov (yellow card) 40'; Tiago Rodrigues (yellow card) 67'; Watt 77' (yellow card) 77'	Report	Isa 24'; Rodrigo 37' (pen.), 60' (yellow card) 19'; Popov (yellow card) 33' (yellow-red card) 88'; Andrade (yellow card) 41'; Panayotov (yellow card) 61'; Panov (yellow card) 77'; Ndongala (yellow card) 77'	Stadium: Balgarska Armia; Attendance: 1,400; Referee: Georgi Kabakov

27 July 2019 Round 3	Cherno More	1–1	Etar	Varna
	Chantakias 24'	Report	Stanoev (yellow card) 17'; Z. Iliev (yellow card) 22'; Bojaj (yellow card) 66'; Mladenov 79'; Stoyanov (yellow card) 87'; Apostolov (yellow card) 90+3'	Stadium: Ticha; Attendance: 2,700; Referee: Volen Chinkov

2 August 2019 Round 4	Cherno More	0–0	Slavia Sofia	Varna
	Panayotov (yellow card) 32'; Andrade (yellow card) 34'; Isa (yellow card) 63'; Minchev (yellow card) 63'; Dyulgerov (yellow card) 82'	Report	Karabelyov (yellow card) 36'; Georgiev (yellow card) 41'; Gamakov (yellow card) 49'; Ivanov (yellow card) 56'; Velkovski (yellow card) 64' (yellow-red card) 81'; Shokolarov (yellow card) 71'; Hristov (yellow card) 79'; Popadiyn (yellow card) 84'	Stadium: Ticha; Attendance: 1,700; Referee: Vladimir Vulkov

9 August 2019 Round 5	Botev Vratsa	1–1	Cherno More	Vratsa
	Kerchev (yellow card) 70'; Valchev 89'; Zlatinski (yellow card) 90+4'	Report	Chantakias (yellow card) 21'; Isa 45+1' (yellow card) 90'; Enchev (yellow card) 72'	Stadium: Hristo Botev Stadium; Attendance: 840; Referee: Petar Kostadinov

18 August 2019 Round 6	Cherno More	1–2	Ludogorets	Varna
	Rodrigo 28'; Chantakias (yellow card) 58'; Neagu (yellow card) 61'; Panov (yellow card) 65'	Report	Góralski (yellow card) 16'; Biton 32'; Dyakov (yellow card) 48'; Iliev (yellow card) 62'; Keșerü 75'; Marcelinho (yellow card) 80' (yellow-red card) 85'; Tchibota (yellow card) 86'; Świerczok (yellow card) 90+2'	Stadium: Ticha; Attendance: 3,400; Referee: Ivaylo Stoyanov

23 August 2019 Round 7	Arda	0–0	Cherno More	Plovdiv
	Hovsepyan (yellow card) 5' (yellow-red card) 38'; Lozev (yellow card) 20'; Gajić (yellow card) 37'	Report	Kiki (yellow card) 13'; Enchev (yellow card) 15'; Jorginho (penalty missed) 39'; Chantakias (yellow card) 50'; Andrade (yellow card) 82'; Minchev (yellow card) 88'; Popov (yellow card) 90+3'	Stadium: Stadion Lokomotiv; Attendance: 240; Referee: Nikolay Yordanov

30 August 2019 Round 8	Cherno More	1–1	Dunav Ruse	Varna
	Iliev 48'; Chantakias (yellow card) 90+1'	Report	Nikolov (yellow card) 20'; Ahmedov 45+1'; Isaevski (yellow card) 85'	Stadium: Ticha; Attendance: 1,100; Referee: Dragomir Draganov

15 September 2019 Round 9	Levski Sofia	3–0	Cherno More	Sofia
	S. Ivanov 21'; Paulinho 31'; Thiam (yellow card) 33'; Robertha 35'	Report	Andrade (yellow card) 25'; Jorginho (yellow card) 64'	Stadium: Vivacom Arena - Georgi Asparuhov; Attendance: 4,307; Referee: Radoslav Gidzhenov

20 September 2019 Round 10	Cherno More	2–0	Botev Plovdiv	Varna
	Isa 49'; Rodrigo (penalty missed) 65'; Minchev 67' (pen.); Jordão (yellow card) 71'	Report	Viana (yellow card) 23'; Argilashki (yellow card) 66'; Ebert (yellow card) 86'	Stadium: Ticha; Attendance: 950; Referee: Stanislav Todorov

27 September 2019 Round 11	Tsarsko Selo	1–1	Cherno More	Sofia
	Kavdanski (yellow card) 21'; Karachanakov (yellow card) 29'; Wesley 50'; G. Minchev (yellow card) 52'; Anderson (yellow card) 90+3'	Report	Stanchev (yellow card) 3'; Popov (yellow card) 7'; Enchev 56' (red card) 77'; Dimov (yellow card) 70'	Stadium: Tsarsko Selo Sports Complex; Attendance: 450; Referee: Georgi Kabakov

4 October 2019 Round 12	Cherno More	2–0	Beroe	Varna
	Dimov (yellow card) 27'; Isa 38'; Andrade (yellow card) 43'; Panayotov (yellow card) 70'; Minchev 86' (pen.)	Report	Tsvetkov (yellow card) 31'; Minchev (yellow card) 71'; Vasilev (yellow card) 85'	Stadium: Ticha; Attendance: 700; Referee: Ivaylo Stoyanov

18 October 2019 Round 13	Vitosha Bistritsa	0–2	Cherno More	Bistritsa
	Gochev (yellow card) 25'; Kochilov (yellow card) 26'; Gyonov (yellow card) 48'	Report	Panov (yellow card) 22'; Aktaou (yellow card) 42'; Rodrigo (yellow card) 43' (goal) 54'; Kiki 65'; Isa (yellow card) 90+2'	Stadium: Stadion Bistritsa; Attendance: 300; Referee: Nikola Popov

29 October 2019 Round 14	Lokomotiv Plovdiv	1–0	Cherno More	Plovdiv
	D. Iliev 14'; Petrović (yellow card) 28' (yellow-red card) 62'; Umarbayev (yellow card) 44'; Lukov (yellow card) 90+4'	Report	Panov (yellow card) 40'; Isa (yellow card) 42'; Dimov (yellow card) 75'; I. Iliev (yellow card) 90+4'	Stadium: Stadion Lokomotiv; Attendance: 1,200; Referee: Volen Chinkov

5 November 2019 Round 15	Cherno More	0–2	CSKA Sofia	Varna
	Andrade (yellow card) 16'; Kiki (yellow card) 45'; Popov (yellow card) 61'; Yanchev (yellow card) 76'; Panayotov (yellow card) 81'	Report	Evandro (yellow card) 13'; Sowe (yellow card) 30' (goal) 90+2'; Mazikou (yellow card) 67'; Geferson (yellow card) 81'; Pinto (yellow card) 82'; Malinov 88'	Stadium: Ticha; Attendance: 6,700; Referee: Nikolay Yordanov

9 November 2019 Round 16	Etar	1–0	Cherno More	Veliko Tarnovo
	Kovachev (yellow card) 17'; Rumenov 45+1' (pen.) (yellow card) 88'; Bojaj (yellow card) 58'; Kolev (yellow card) 68'; Z. Iliev (yellow card) 70'	Report	Enchev (yellow card) 45'; Minchev (penalty missed) 70'	Stadium: Stadion Ivaylo; Attendance: 1,500; Referee: Nikola Popov

23 November 2019 Round 17	Slavia Sofia	0–1	Cherno More	Sofia
	Ivanov (yellow card) 37'; Dyulgerov (yellow card) 61' (yellow-red card) 69'	Report	Andrade (yellow card) 15'; Jordão (yellow card) 60'; Yordanov (yellow card) 88'; Isa 90+1'	Stadium: Stadion Slavia; Attendance: 230; Referee: Radoslav Gidzhenov

30 November 2019 Round 18	Cherno More	4–1	Botev Vratsa	Varna
	Minchev 28', 31'; Isa 51', 74'	Report	Gadzhev (yellow card) 27'; Atanasov 72'	Stadium: Ticha; Attendance: 650; Referee: Nedelcho Gadzhalov

7 December 2019 Round 19	Ludogorets	1–1	Cherno More	Razgrad
	Świerczok 84'; Cicinho (red card) 90+3'	Report	Boukassi (yellow card) 14'; Aktaou 43'; Chantakias (yellow card) 69'; Popov (yellow card) 75'; Dimov (yellow card) 87'	Stadium: Ludogorets Arena; Attendance: 800; Referee: Georgi Kabakov

14 December 2019 Round 20	Cherno More	1–1	Arda	Varna
	Panayotov (yellow card) 39'; Minchev 52' (yellow card) 89'	Report	Vasilev 11'; Hovsepyan (yellow card) 28'; Matheus Leoni (yellow card) 51'; Martinov (yellow card) 76'	Stadium: Ticha; Attendance: 1,000; Referee: Georgi Davidov

16 February 2020 Round 21	Dunav Ruse	0–2	Cherno More	Ruse
	Dimov (yellow card) 30'; Mitkov (yellow card) 38'	Report	Andrade 5'; Stanchev (yellow card) 37'; Coureur 53'	Stadium: Gradski; Attendance: 1,200; Referee: Nikolay Yordanov

22 February 2020 Round 22	Cherno More	2–2	Levski Sofia	Varna
	Coureur 14' (yellow card) 59'; Andrade (yellow card) 16'; Chantakias (yellow card) 31'; Panayotov (yellow card) 34'; Isa (yellow card) 38' (yellow-red card) 39'; Popov (yellow card) 61'; Minchev 90+4'	Report	Kargas (yellow card) 15'; Spierings 19'; Paulinho (yellow card) 43'; Thiam (yellow card) 60'; Goranov (yellow card) 62' (yellow-red card) 75'; Eyjólfsson (yellow card) 87'; Alar 90+3'	Stadium: Ticha; Attendance: 5,000; Referee: Ivaylo Stoyanov

29 February 2020 Round 23	Botev Plovdiv	1–1	Cherno More	Plovdiv
	Nichev (yellow card) 54'; Filipov 58'; Pirgov (yellow card) 63'	Report	Chantakias (yellow card) 22'; Angelov (yellow card) 72'; Rodrigo 79' (yellow card) 80'; Jordão (yellow card) 88'	Stadium: Futbolen kompleks Botev 1912; Attendance: 2,000; Referee: Petar Kostadinov

6 March 2020 Round 24	Cherno More	1–0	Tsarsko Selo	Varna
	Dimov 32'; Panayotov (yellow card) 45'; Stanchev (yellow card) 61'	Report	Placide (yellow card) 32'; Julio (yellow card) 60'; Kavdanski (yellow card) 78'	Stadium: Ticha; Attendance: 1,200; Referee: Vladimir Valkov

7 June 2020 Round 25	Beroe	3–0	Cherno More	Stara Zagora
	Kamburov 29' (pen.); Fall 44' (yellow card) 67'; Josipovic 86'; Octávio (yellow card) 88'	Report	Stanchev (yellow card) 21' (yellow-red card) 37'; Andrade (yellow card) 82'	Stadium: Stadion Beroe; Attendance: 900; Referee: Stanislav Todorov

13 June 2020 Round 26	Cherno More	2–0	Vitosha Bistritsa	Varna
	Sadula 45+1' (o.g.); Isa 48'; Popov (yellow card) 70'; Vutsov (yellow card) 90+2'	Report	Kabov (yellow card) 71'	Stadium: Ticha; Attendance: 400; Referee: Stanimir Trenchev

==== League table ====
Pos	Team	Pld	W	D	L	GF	GA	GD	Pts	Qualification
5	Slavia Sofia	26	13	6	7	36	28	+8	45	Qualification for the Championship round
6	Beroe	26	14	1	11	44	34	+10	43	Qualification for the Championship round
7	Cherno More	26	10	10	6	32	24	+8	40	Qualification for the Relegation round
8	Arda	26	7	10	9	27	33	−6	31	Qualification for the Relegation round
9	Botev Plovdiv	26	8	6	12	26	30	−4	30	Qualification for the Relegation round

Source: Soccerway
Rules for classification: 1) Points; 2) Head-to-head points; 3) Head-to-head goal difference; 4) Head-to-head goals scored; 5) Head-to-head away goals scored (only if two teams); 6) Goal difference; 7) Goals scored; 8) Fairplay ranking; 9) Draw.

=== Results summary ===
Overall								Home						Away					
Pld	W	D	L	GF	GA	GD	Pts	W	D	L	GF	GA	GD	W	D	L	GF	GA	GD
26	10	10	6	32	24	+8	40	6	5	2	20	11	+9	4	5	4	12	13	−1

Last updated: 13 June 2020.
Source: flashscore.com

=== League performance ===
Round	1	2	3	4	5	6	7	8	9	10	11	12	13	14	15	16	17	18	19	20	21	22	23	24	25	26
Ground	H	A	H	H	A	H	A	H	A	H	A	H	A	A	H	A	A	H	A	H	A	H	A	H	A	H
Result	W	W	D	D	D	L	D	D	L	W	D	W	W	L	L	L	W	W	D	D	W	D	D	W	L	W
Position	2	2	3	3	4	6	6	7	7	7	7	5	5	6	6	7	6	5	6	6	6	5	6	6	7	7

Source: bulgarian-football.com
A = Away; H = Home; W = Win; D = Draw; L = Loss

== Bulgarian Cup ==
24 September 2019 Round of 32	Botev Ihtiman	0–3	Cherno More	Ihtiman
	Tsenev (yellow card) 73' (yellow-red card)	Report	Minchev 49'; Rodrigo 78'; Yordanov 90'	Stadium: Hristo Botev; Referee: Valentin Stanchev

4 December 2019 Round of 16	Levski Sofia	1–0	Cherno More	Sofia
	Raynov 24'; Kargas (yellow card) 33'; Thiam (yellow card) 52'; Paulinho (yellow card) 59'; S. Ivanov (yellow card) 79'	Report	Panayotov (yellow card) 35'; Panov (yellow card) 51'; Minchev (yellow card) 72'	Stadium: Vivacom Arena - Georgi Asparuhov; Referee: Nikolay Yordanov

== Player statistics ==
As of match played 7 December 2019

Key

No. = Squad number

Pos = Playing position

Nat. = Nationality

Apps = Appearances

GK = Goalkeeper

DF = Defender

MF = Midfielder

FW = Forward

= Yellow cards

= Red cards

Numbers in parentheses denote appearances as substitute.

No.	Pos.	Nat.	Name	First Professional Football League		Bulgarian Cup		Total		Discipline	
No.	Pos.	Nat.	Name	Apps	Goals	Apps	Goals	Apps	Goals	A yellow rectangular card	A red rectangular card
2	DF	BUL	Tsvetomir Panov	18	0	2	0	20	0	5	0
5	DF	BUL	Stefan Stanchev	9(1)	0	2	0	11(1)	0	0	0
6	MF	BUL	Viktor Popov	17	0	1	0	18	0	5	1
7	MF	BUL	Patrick Andrade	15(1)	0	2	0	17(1)	0	8	0
8	MF	BUL	Emil Yanchev	1(5)	0	1	0	2(5)	0	0	0
9	FW	BUL	Ismail Isa	15	8	1	0	16	8	4	0
10	MF	BUL	Ilian Iliev	4(8)	1	0(1)	0	4(9)	1	1	0
11	FW	BRA	Jorginho	3(2)	0	0	0	3(2)	0	1	0
11	FW	ALG	Mehdi Boukassi	1(1)	0	1	0	2(1)	0	1	0
18	GK	SUI	Miodrag Mitrović	11	0	2	0	13	0	0	0
19	MF	BUL	Velislav Vasilev	0	0	0	0	0	0	0	0
20	FW	BRA	Jordão Cardoso	2(11)	0	1	0	3(11)	0	2	0
23	DF	ROM	Ionuț Neagu	0(4)	0	0	0	0(4)	0	0	0
25	GK	BUL	Ivan Dyulgerov	8	0	0	0	8	0	1	0
26	GK	BUL	Ivan Dichevski	0	0	0	0	0	0	0	0
27	DF	BUL	Daniel Dimov	11(1)	0	1	0	12(1)	0	4	0
31	MF	BUL	Lachezar Yordanov	0(3)	0	0(1)	1	0(4)	1	1	0
33	DF	BUL	Miroslav Enchev	11	1	0	0	11	1	4	1
38	MF	DRC	Aristote N'Dongala	10(7)	1	1(1)	0	11(8)	1	1	0
44	DF	GRE	Dimitrios Chantakias	13(2)	1	1	0	14(2)	1	5	0
45	FW	BUL	Denislav Angelov	0(1)	0	0(1)	0	0(2)	0	0	0
71	MF	BUL	Vasil Panayotov	18	0	1(1)	0	19(1)	0	5	0
72	MF	BRA	Rodrigo Henrique	17	4	2	1	19	5	3	0
90	FW	BUL	Martin Minchev	17(1)	4	2	1	19(1)	5	3	0
93	DF	NED	Fahd Aktaou	2(1)	1	1(1)	0	3(2)	1	1	0
99	FW	BUL	Dani Kiki	6(4)	1	0	0	6(4)	1	2	0
