= Ivaylo Markov =

Bulgarian footballer

Ivaylo Markov Ивайло Марков
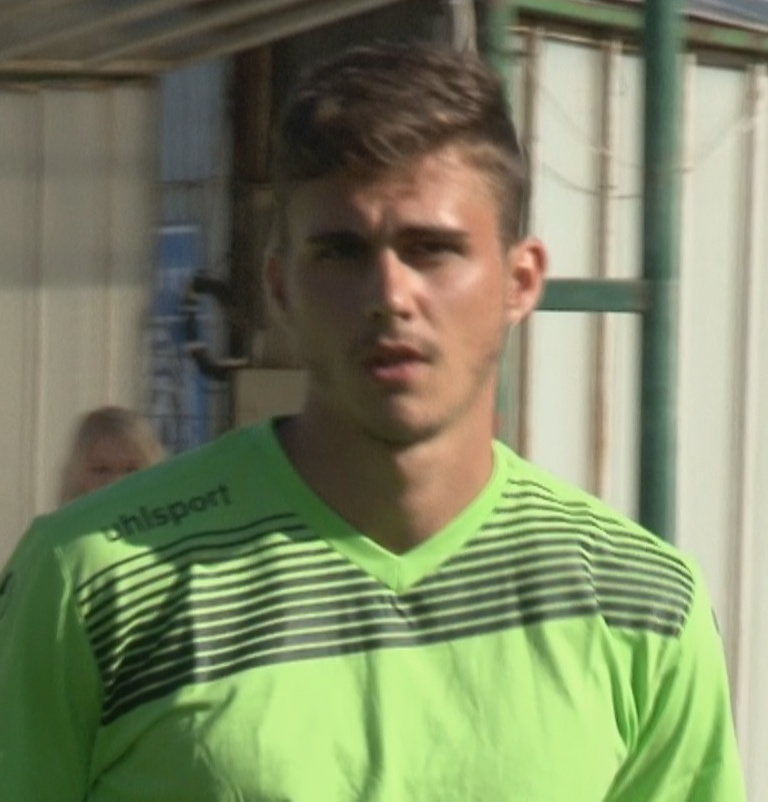

Personal information
- Full name: Ivaylo Borislavov Markov
- Date of birth: 5 June 1997 (age 29)
- Place of birth: Sofia, Bulgaria
- Height: 1.90 m (6 ft 3 in)
- Position: Defender

Youth career
- –2015: Slavia Sofia

Senior career*
Years	Team	Apps	(Gls)
2015–2016	Slavia Sofia	0	(0)
2016	→ Slivnishki Geroy (loan)	14	(2)
2016–2018	Lokomotiv Plovdiv	9	(0)
2017	→ Tsarsko Selo (loan)	12	(0)
2018	Dunav Ruse	0	(0)
2018–2019	Cherno More	0	(0)
2018–2019	→ Tsarsko Selo (loan)	21	(0)
2019–2021	Tsarsko Selo	42	(0)
2021–2022	Hapoel Hadera	27	(0)
2022–2023	Podbeskidzie Bielsko-Biała	21	(0)
2023	UTA Arad	5	(0)
2024	Slavia Sofia	5	(0)
2024–2025	Warta Poznań	20	(0)
2026	Montana	15	(0)

International career^{‡}
2023	Bulgaria	1	(0)
- * Club domestic league appearances and goals as of 11 June 2026 ‡ National team caps and goals as of 27 March 2023

Ivaylo Borislavov Markov (Bulgarian: Ивайло Бориславов Марков; born 5 June 1997) is a Bulgarian professional footballer who plays as a defender.

== Career ==
Markov started his career at the youth ranks of Slavia Sofia. On 1 February 2016, he was loaned to Slivnishki Geroy in the South-West V AFG league.

On 24 July, Markov signed a three-year contract with Lokomotiv Plovdiv. On 11 January 2017, he was loaned to Tsarsko Selo until the end of the season. On 25 February, he made his professional debut in the Second League, playing full 90 minutes in a 1–2 away defeat by Vitosha Bistritsa.

On 14 July 2017, Markov made his First League debut for Lokomotiv Plovdiv in a 2–1 away win over Etar.

In June 2018, Markov signed with Cherno More. As he faced serious competition from Daniel Dimov, Plamen Dimov, Ilias Hassani and Miroslav Enchev, on 25 July the club loaned him to Tsarsko Selo.

On 16 July 2021, Markov signed for Israeli Premier League club Hapoel Hadera.

On 16 June 2022, he moved to Poland, signing a two-year deal with I liga side Podbeskidzie Bielsko-Biała.

On 5 July 2023, Markov signed a contract with Romanian side UTA Arad. He signed a one-year contract, with an option to extend it.

In September 2024, Markov returned to Poland, joining Warta Poznań on an initial one-year deal.

== International career ==
On 27 March 2023, Markov made his debut for the national team, playing as a starter in the 0–3 away loss against Hungary in a Euro 2024 qualifier.

== Career statistics ==
=== Club ===
As of match played 11 May 2025

Appearances and goals by club, season and competition
Club	Season	League			National cup (Note: Includes Bulgarian Cup, Israel State Cup, Polish Cup, Cupa României)		Europe		Other		Total	
Club	Season	Division	Apps	Goals	Apps	Goals	Apps	Goals	Apps	Goals	Apps	Goals
Slavia Sofia	2014–15	First League	0	0	0	0	—		—		0	0
Slivnishki Geroy (loan)	2015–16	Third League	14	2	—		—		—		14	2
Lokomotiv Plovdiv	2016–17	First League	0	0	2	0	—		—		2	0
Lokomotiv Plovdiv	2017–18	First League	9	0	0	0	—		—		9	0
Lokomotiv Plovdiv	Total		9	0	2	0	—		—		11	0
Tsarsko Selo (loan)	2016–17	Second League	12	0	—		—		—		12	0
Dunav Ruse	2017–18	First League	0	0	0	0	—		—		0	0
Cherno More	2018–19	First League	0	0	0	0	—		—		0	0
Tsarsko Selo (loan)	2018–19	Second League	21	0	1	0	—		—		22	0
Tsarsko Selo	2019–20	First League	18	0	1	0	—		1 (Note: Appearance in First League promotion/relegation play-offs)	0	20	0
Tsarsko Selo	2020–21	First League	24	0	1	0	—		—		25	0
Tsarsko Selo	Total		63	0	3	0	—		1	0	67	0
Hapoel Hadera	2021–22	Israeli Premier League	27	0	2	0	—		5 (Note: Appearances in Toto Cup)	0	34	0
Podbeskidzie	2022–23	I liga	21	0	1	0	—		—		22	0
UTA Arad	2023–24	Liga I	5	0	2	0	—		—		7	0
Slavia Sofia	2023–24	First League	5	0	—		—		—		5	0
Warta Poznań	2024–25	I liga	20	0	1	0	—		—		21	0
Career total			176	2	11	0	0	0	6	0	193	2

=== International ===
As of match played 27 March 2023

Appearances and goals by national team and year
National team	Year	Apps	Goals
Bulgaria	2023	1	0
Total		1	0

== Honours ==
Tsarsko Selo

- Second Professional Football League: 2018–19
