= Viktor Popov =

Bulgarian footballer

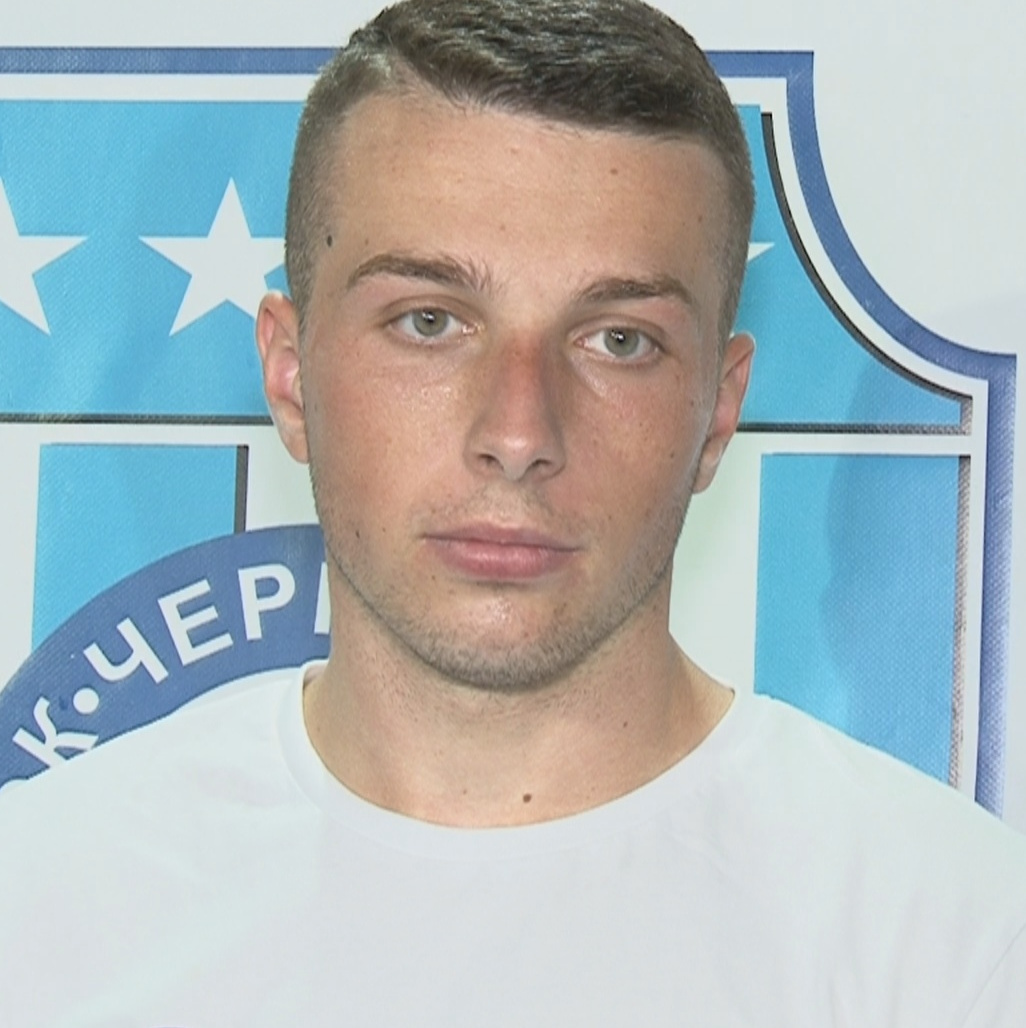
- Popov in 2019

Personal information
- Full name: Viktor Nikolaev Popov
- Date of birth: 5 March 2000 (age 26)
- Place of birth: Varna, Bulgaria
- Height: 1.80 m (5 ft 11 in)
- Position: Right-back

Team information
- Current team: Arda Kardzhali
- Number: 6

Youth career
- 2005–2019: Cherno More

Senior career*
Years	Team	Apps	(Gls)
2019–2025	Cherno More	180	(2)
2025–2026	Korona Kielce	8	(0)
2026	Korona Kielce II	1	(0)
2026–	Arda Kardzhali	9	(0)

International career^{‡}
2018	Bulgaria U19	4	(0)
2019–2022	Bulgaria U21	18	(0)
2019–	Bulgaria	24	(0)
- * Club domestic league appearances and goals as of 15:34, 6 October 2026 (UTC) ‡ National team caps and goals as of 21:06, 11 October 2025 (UTC)

Viktor Nikolaev Popov (Bulgarian: Виктор Николаев Попов; born 5 March 2000) is a Bulgarian professional footballer who plays as a right-back for First League club Arda Kardzhali and the Bulgaria national team.

Born and raised in Varna, Popov joined Cherno More's academy in 2010. He made his senior debut in May 2019, aged 19. He signed for Korona Kielce in May 2025.

Popov has also represented Bulgaria at various youth levels and made his senior debut in November 2019.

== Club career ==
=== Cherno More ===
Popov made his first team debut for Cherno More Varna in a 1–0 home win against Botev Plovdiv on 18 May 2019, playing full 90 minutes. Ten days later he signed his first professional contract with the club. On 10 July 2022, he scored his first goal for the club in a 1–0 away win over Lokomotiv Sofia in the opening game of the 2022–23 season. Popov left the club after his contract expired at the end of 2024–25 season.

=== Korona Kielce ===
On 30 May 2025, Popov signed a two-year contract as a free agent with Polish club Korona Kielce.

=== Arda Kardzhali ===
In June 2026, he returned to Bulgaria, putting pen to paper on a contract with Arda Kardzhali.

== International career ==
On 14 November 2019, he earned his first cap for Bulgaria, coming on as a late second-half substitute for Strahil Popov in the 0–1 home loss against Paraguay in a friendly match.

== Career statistics ==
=== Club ===
As of match played 11 April 2026

Appearances and goals by club, season and competition
Club	Season	League			National cup (Note: Includes Bulgarian Cup, Polish Cup)		Continental		Other		Total	
Club	Season	Division	Apps	Goals	Apps	Goals	Apps	Goals	Apps	Goals	Apps	Goals
Cherno More	2018–19	First League	2	0	0	0	—		—		2	0
Cherno More	2019–20	First League	26	0	1	0	—		—		27	0
Cherno More	2020–21	First League	31	0	1	0	—		1 (Note: Appearance in UEFA Europa League play-off)	0	33	0
Cherno More	2021–22	First League	29	0	2	0	—		—		31	0
Cherno More	2022–23	First League	30	1	5	0	—		—		35	1
Cherno More	2023–24	First League	30	0	0	0	—		—		30	0
Cherno More	2024–25	First League	32	1	5	1	2 (Note: Appearance(s) in UEFA Conference League)	0	—		39	2
Cherno More	Total		180	2	14	1	2	0	1	0	197	3
Korona Kielce	2025–26	Ekstraklasa	8	0	2	0	—		—		10	0
Korona Kielce	2025–26	III liga, group IV	1	0	0	0	—		—		1	0
Career total			189	2	16	1	2	0	1	0	208	3

=== International ===
As of match played 11 October 2025

Appearances and goals by national team and year
National team	Year	Apps	Goals
Bulgaria	2019	1	0
Bulgaria	2020	2	0
Bulgaria	2022	3	0
Bulgaria	2023	7	0
Bulgaria	2024	8	0
Bulgaria	2025	3	0
Total		24	0
