= Dany Maury =

Cameroonian footballer

Personal information
- Full name: Dany Maury
- Date of birth: 18 August 1994 (age 32)
- Place of birth: Douala, Cameroon
- Height: 1.75 m (5 ft 9 in)
- Position: Centre-back

Team information
- Current team: Trélissac

Youth career
- –2014: Toulouse

Senior career*
Years	Team	Apps	(Gls)
2014–2016	Toulouse B	37	(1)
2014	→ Toulouse	1	(0)
2017–	Trélissac	35	(0)
- * Club domestic league appearances and goals as of 1 July 2019

Dany Maury (born 18 August 1994) is a Cameroonian professional footballer who plays as a centre-back for Trélissac FC.

== Club career ==
Maury made his Ligue 1 debut for Toulouse on 11 February 2014 in a 1–3 home defeat against SC Bastia playing the first 50 minutes, before being substituted for Ilias Hassani.
