= Aristote N'Dongala =

Congolese footballer

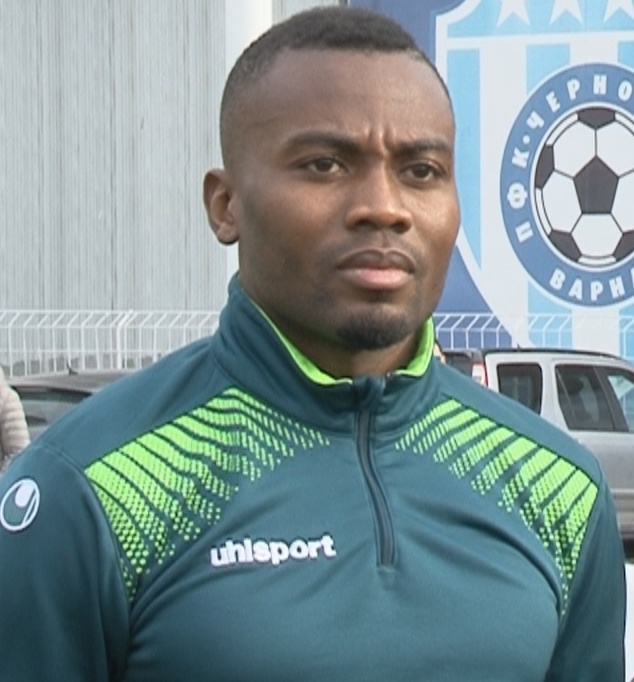
- N'Dongala with Cherno More in January 2018

Personal information
- Full name: Aristote N'Dongala
- Date of birth: 19 January 1994 (age 32)
- Place of birth: Kinshasa, Zaire
- Height: 1.74 m (5 ft 9 in)
- Position: Winger

Youth career
- 2010–2011: Créteil
- 2011–2013: Nantes

Senior career*
Years	Team	Apps	(Gls)
2012–2016	Nantes B	83	(3)
2012–2016	Nantes	2	(0)
2016	Sprimont	9	(1)
2017	Lokomotiv GO	26	(10)
2018–2019	Cherno More	58	(3)
2020	Academica Clinceni	1	(0)

International career^{‡}
2013–2015	DR Congo U20		
2015–	DR Congo	1	(0)
- * Club domestic league appearances and goals as of 20 August 2020 ‡ National team caps and goals as of 09:55, 13 September 2015 (UTC)

Aristote N'Dongala (born 19 January 1994) is a Congolese professional footballer who plays as a winger and wing-back for Academica Clinceni.

== Club career ==
N'Dongala joined FC Nantes at the age of 17 in 2011. He made his senior debut for the club on 22 January 2013, replacing Adrien Trebel for the final 24 minutes of a Coupe de France match against SAS Épinal at Stade de la Colombière. He made his Ligue 1 debut on 17 May 2014 against SC Bastia in a 0–1 away win, playing the full game.

In January 2017, N'Dongala joined Bulgarian First League club Lokomotiv Gorna Oryahovitsa. He did not report back at the beginning of the 2017–18 season so the club undertook legal proceedings at FIFA. However, he was announced as new addition to the squad on 15 September.

In January 2018 N'Dongala signed a contract with Cherno More. On 17 February, he made his debut in a 1–4 home defeat by Beroe, coming on as substitute for Hugo Konongo at the start of the second half. In January 2020, N'Dongala became part of the Academica Clinceni team in neighbouring Romania.

== International career ==
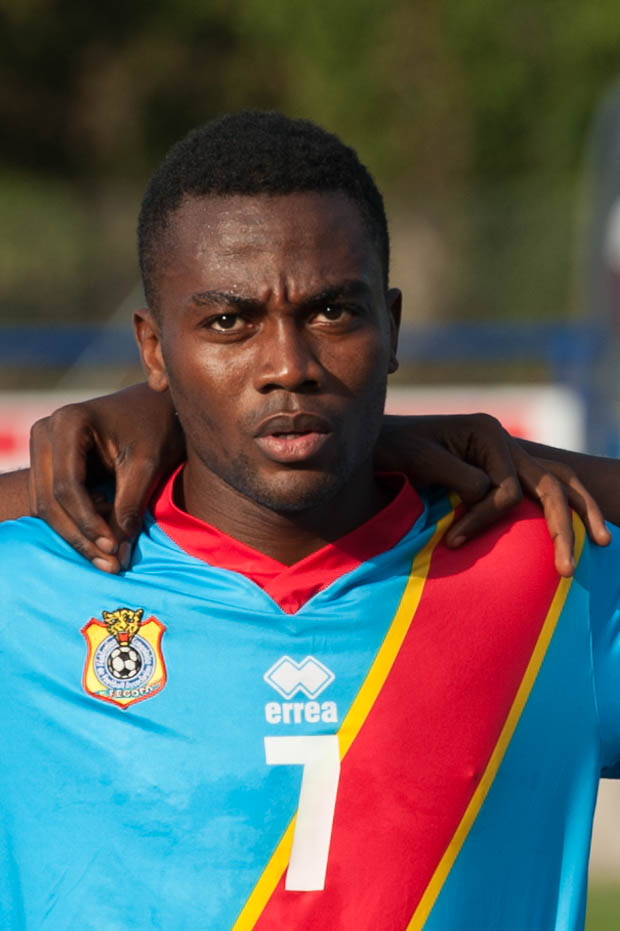
N'Dongala with DR Congo U20 in 2014.

In 2013 Sébastien Migné, coach of the DRC national U-20 team, called N'Dongala up to be a member of the Democratic Republic of the Congo national under-20 football team for the 2013 African Youth Championship in Algeria.

He made his debut for the senior national team in 2015.

== Career statistics ==
As of 15 December 2019

Club	Season	League			Cup		Europe		Total	
Club	Season	Division	Apps	Goals	Apps	Goals	Apps	Goals	Apps	Goals
Nantes	2012–13	Ligue 1	0	0	1	0	—		1	0
Nantes	2013–14	Ligue 1	1	0	0	0	—		1	0
Nantes	2014–15	Ligue 1	1	0	0	0	—		1	0
Nantes	2015–16	Ligue 1	0	0	0	0	—		0	0
Nantes	Total		2	0	1	0	0	0	3	0
Nantes B	2012–13	National 3	10	2	—		—		10	2
Nantes B	2013–14	National 2	24	0	—		—		24	0
Nantes B	2014–15	National 2	28	0	—		—		28	0
Nantes B	2015–16	National 2	21	1	—		—		21	1
Nantes B	Total		83	3	0	0	0	0	83	3
Sprimont	2016–17	First Amateur Division	9	1	1	0	—		10	1
Lokomotiv GO	2016–17	Bulgarian First League	16	6	0	0	—		16	6
Lokomotiv GO	2017–18	Bulgarian Second League	10	4	1	0	—		11	4
Lokomotiv GO	Total		26	10	1	0	0	0	27	10
Cherno More	2017–18	Bulgarian First League	8	0	0	0	—		8	0
Cherno More	2018–19	Bulgarian First League	33	2	1	0	—		34	2
Cherno More	2019–20	Bulgarian First League	17	1	2	0	—		19	1
Cherno More	Total		58	3	3	0	0	0	61	3
Career total			178	17	6	0	0	0	184	17
