= Jordão Cardoso =

Portuguese footballer

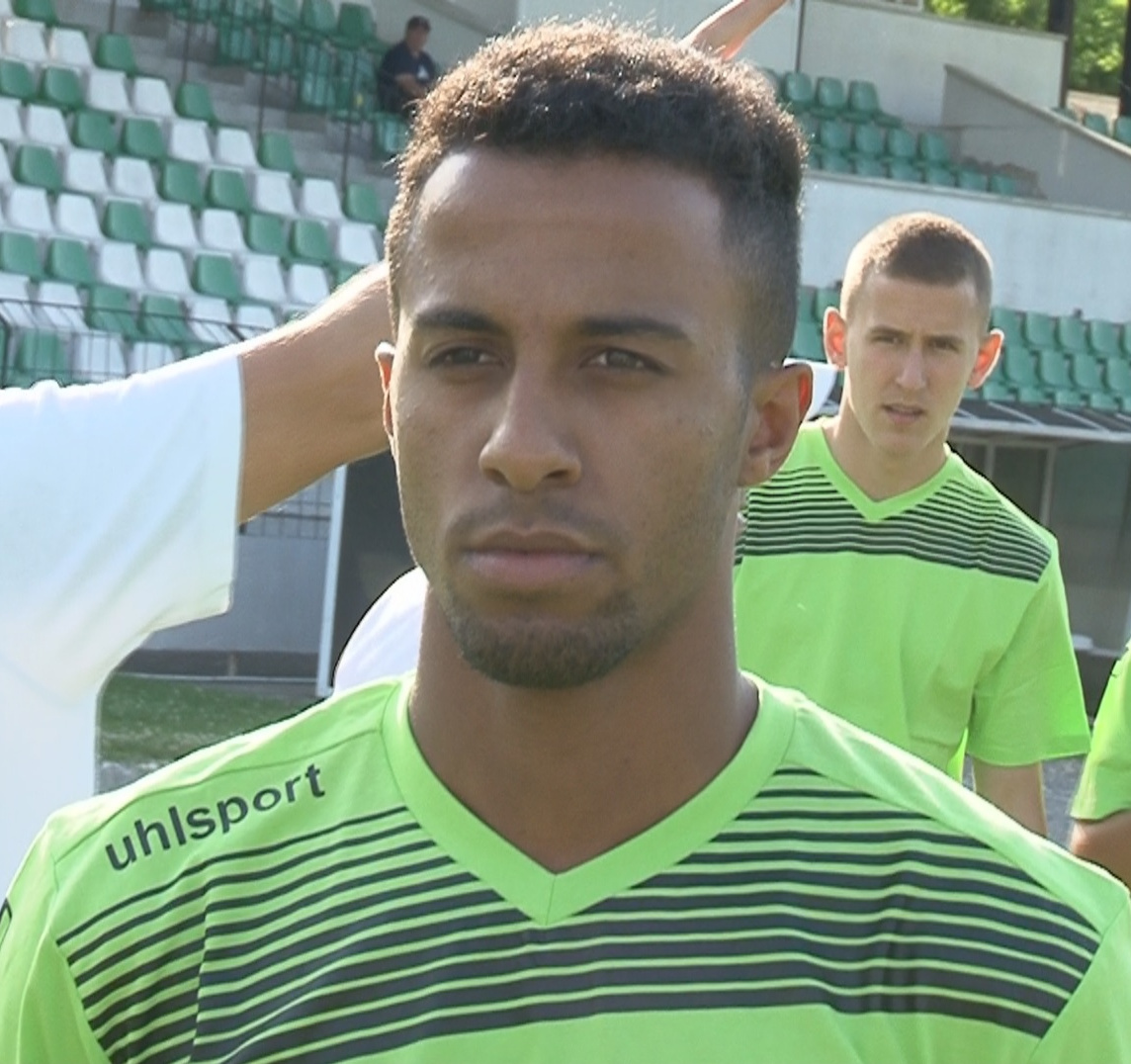
- Cardoso in 2019

Personal information
- Full name: Álvaro Jordão Pinto Silva Cardoso
- Date of birth: 14 October 1996 (age 30)
- Place of birth: Viana do Castelo, Portugal
- Height: 1.73 m (5 ft 8 in)
- Position: Winger

Team information
- Current team: Varzim
- Number: 13

Youth career
- 2004–2013: Vianense
- 2013: Rio Ave
- 2013–2014: Vianense
- 2014–2015: Académica de Coimbra

Senior career*
Years	Team	Apps	(Gls)
2015–2016	Vianense	26	(3)
2016–2017	Mirandela	33	(4)
2017–2018	Doxa Katokopias	0	(0)
2017–2018	→ ASIL Lysi (loan)	9	(3)
2018–2019	Benfica Castelo Branco	29	(3)
2019–2020	Cherno More	20	(0)
2020–2021	Amora	19	(2)
2021–2022	Sanjoanense	16	(4)
2022–2024	Vianense	56	(7)
2024	Lahti	11	(1)
2025–2026	A'Ali		
2026–	Varzim	2	(0)
- * Club domestic league appearances and goals as of 27 October 2024

Álvaro Jordão Pinto Silva Cardoso (born 14 October 1996) is a Portuguese professional footballer who plays as a winger for Liga 3 club Varzim.

== Career statistics ==
As of 1 December 2024

Appearances and goals by club, season and competition
Club	Season	League			Cup (Note: Includes Taça de Portugal and Bulgarian Cup)		Other		Total	
Club	Season	Division	Apps	Goals	Apps	Goals	Apps	Goals	Apps	Goals
Vianense	2015–16	Campeonato de Portugal	26	3	1	0	–		27	3
Mirandela	2016–17	Campeonato de Portugal	33	4	–		–		33	4
Doxa Katokopias	2017–18	Cypriot First Division	0	0	0	0	–		0	0
ASIL Lysi (loan)	2017–18	Cypriot Second Division	9	3	–		–		9	3
Benfica Castelo Branco	2018–19	Campeonato de Portugal	29	3	0	0	–		29	3
Cherno More	2019–20	Bulgarian First League	20	0	1	0	–		21	0
Amora	2020–21	Campeonato de Portugal	19	2	2	0	–		21	2
Sanjoanense	2021–22	Liga 3	16	4	–		–		16	4
Vianense	2022–23	Campeonato de Portugal	30	2	1	0	–		31	2
Vianense	2023–24	Liga 3	26	5	1	0	–		27	5
Vianense	Total		56	7	2	0	0	0	58	7
Lahti	2024	Veikkausliiga	11	1	–		–		11	1
A'Ali	2024–25	Bahraini Premier League			–		–			
Career total			190	24	6	0	0	0	196	24
