= Mariyan Ivanov =

Bulgarian footballer

Personal information
- Full name: Mariyan Antonov Ivanov
- Date of birth: 10 July 1990 (age 36)
- Place of birth: Veliko Tarnovo, Bulgaria
- Height: 1.80 m (5 ft 11 in)
- Position: Defender

Team information
- Current team: Lokomotiv Gorna Oryahovitsa
- Number: 26

Senior career*
Years	Team	Apps	(Gls)
2009–2011	Etar 1924	22	(0)
2011	Dorostol	8	(0)
2012	Pomorie	10	(0)
2012–2013	Kaliakra	14	(1)
2013–2014	Etar		
2014–2016	Lokomotiv GO	46	(1)
2017	Botev Vratsa	12	(1)
2017–2018	Lokomotiv GO	25	(2)
2018–2019	Botev Vratsa	21	(0)
2019–2020	Septemvri Sofia	17	(0)
2020–2024	Etar Veliko Tarnovo	99	(2)
2024–	Lokomotiv GO	59	(5)
- * Club domestic league appearances and goals as of 11 June 2026

Mariyan Ivanov (Bulgarian: Мариян Иванов; born 10 July 1990) is a Bulgarian footballer who plays as a defender for Lokomotiv Gorna Oryahovitsa.
