= Fahd Aktaou =

Dutch footballer (born 1993)

Personal information
- Date of birth: 13 January 1993 (age 33)
- Place of birth: Amsterdam, Netherlands
- Height: 1.85 m (6 ft 1 in)
- Position: Left-back

Youth career
- Haarlem
- Ajax
- SC Heerenveen

Senior career*
Years	Team	Apps	(Gls)
2013–2014	SC Heerenveen	0	(0)
2014	→ Almere City (loan)	13	(0)
2014–2016	Heracles Almelo	21	(0)
2015	→ FC Dordrecht (loan)	20	(1)
2016–2018	Wydad Casablanca		
2018–2019	Juve Stabia	15	(0)
2019–2020	Cherno More	4	(1)
2021–2022	Wigry Suwałki	3	(0)
- * Club domestic league appearances and goals

Fahd Aktaou (Arabic: فهد أكتاو; born 13 January 1993) is a Dutch former professional footballer who played as a left-back.

== Club career ==
He formerly played for SC Heerenveen, who loaned him to Almere City. He joined Heracles in the summer 2014, only to be loaned out again to FC Dordrecht in summer 2015. He was expelled from the Dordrecht squad in February 2016 for undisclosed reasons.

In June 2016 Aktaou joined Moroccan side WAC Casablanca.

In the summer of 2018, he moved to Italy, signing with third-tier Serie C club Juve Stabia. He was released from his Juve Stabia contract by mutual consent on 10 January 2019.
