= Aleksandar Isaevski =

Macedonian footballer

Personal information
- Date of birth: 19 May 1995 (age 31)
- Place of birth: Skopje, Republic of Macedonia
- Height: 1.78 m (5 ft 10 in)
- Position: Left back

College career
| Years | Team | Apps | (Gls) |
| 2014–2015 | SVSU Cardinals | 40 | (10) |

Senior career*
| Years | Team | Apps | (Gls) |
| 2015–2017 | FC Detroit City | 50 | (0) |
| 2017-2018 | FK Makedonija GP | 30 | (0) |
| 2018-2019 | FK Pobeda | 30 | (0) |
| 2019–2020 | FC Dunav Ruse | 35 | (0) |
| 2020–2021 | KF Vllaznia Shkodër | 30 | (0) |
| 2021–2022 | FK Dinamo Tirana | 10 | (0) |
| 2022–2023 | FK Makedonija GP | 5 | (0) |
| 2023–2025 | FC Milsami Orhei | 15 | (0) |

International career
| 2015-2025 | North Macedonia | 0 | (0) |
- * Club domestic league appearances and goals as of 21:51, 7 March 2021 (UTC)

Aleksandar Isaevski (born 19 May 1995) is a Macedonian professional footballer who formerly played as a defender for Milsami Orhei.

== Club career ==
Isaevski grew up in the United States and played college soccer for the SVSU Cardinals. In March 2014, he joined Detroit City from Saginaw Valley State University.

His performances at Detroit City FC led him to play in the Macedonian 1st Division, starting off at Makedonija GP. After one season, Isaevski signed for higher ranked Macedonian side FK Pobeda. His strong defensive talent attracted teams from the Bulgarian 1st League.

Isaevski joined Bulgarian side Dunav on 18 January 2019. He significantly helped his side stay within safety of relegation by providing one of the top assists that led Dunav Ruse to victory within the relegation playoff. With this victory, Dunav Ruse remained amongst the teams of Bulgaria's top league for the following season. Isaevski was also named amongst the top 11 players of the week and month for his superb performances.

This eventually attracted FK Villaznia Shkodër to sign him amongst the Albanian Superliga. Within his first season with the Albanian giants, Isaevski helped his team win the Albanian Cup and narrowly finish as runner-up in the Albanian Superliga of 2021. The decider was a narrow goal differential which saw Villaznia finish in 2nd despite being tied for 1st on points. Isaevski's Villaznia squad eventfully finished as Albanian Supercup runners-up in the same season. After an eventful first season, Albanian side Dinamo Tirana signed him to a 1-year contract.

In 2021, he returned to his former team FK Makedonija GP. Isaevski was part of the squad that lifted the 2022 Macedonian Cup while also qualifying to their first ever UEFA Europa Conference League tournament playoff.

The next year, he signed for Moldovan giants FC Milsami Orhei. Isaevski helped them finish 3rd in both the league standings and league cup tournament. This ultimately landed them a qualifying spot for the 2023 UEFA Europa Conference League playoffs.

He is currently a free agent, and is expected to sign with either the United States MLS or USL.

== Honours & Awards ==
=== Team Awards ===
(United States) FC Detroit City

- (gold) NPSL Midwest Region (1): 2017
- (gold) Rust Belt Derby (2): 2015, 2016

(Albania) KF Vllaznia Shkodër

- (gold) Albanian Cup (1): 2021
- (silver) Albanian Superliga (1): 2021
- (silver) Albanian Supercup (1): 2021

(North Macedonia) FK Makedonija Gjorče Petrov

- (gold) Macedonian Cup (1): 2022

(Moldova) FC Milsami Orhei

- (bronze) Moldovan Super Liga (1): 2023
- (bronze) Moldovan Cup (1): 2023

=== Individual Awards ===
(Bulgaria) FC Dunav Ruse

- Top 11 Players of the Month: Bulgarian 1st League: 2020
- Relegation Playoff Winner (Squad): Bulgarian 1st League: 2019

(North Macedonia) FK Makedonija Gjorče Petrov

- UEFA Europa Conference League Qualified Squad: 2022

(Moldova) FC Milsami Orhei

- UEFA Europa Conference League Qualified Squad: 2023
