= Yevhen Dobrovolskyi =

Ukrainian football midfielder

Personal information
- Full name: Yevhen Stanislavovych Dobrovolskyi
- Date of birth: 10 February 1995 (age 31)
- Place of birth: Ukraine
- Height: 1.81 m (5 ft 11 1/2 in)
- Position: Midfielder

Team information
- Current team: Vereya
- Number: 18

Youth career
- 2008–2012: Youth Sportive School Uzhhorod

Senior career*
Years	Team	Apps	(Gls)
2012–2016	Hoverla Uzhhorod	3	(0)
2019–	Vereya	6	(0)
- * Club domestic league appearances and goals as of 25 March 2019

Yevhen Dobrovolskyi (Ukrainian: Євген Станіславович Добровольський; born 10 February 1995 in Ukraine) is a Ukrainian football midfielder who most recently played for Vereya in the Bulgarian First League.

== Career ==
Dobrovolskyi is a product of Uzhhorod Youth Sportive School System. In 2012, he signed a contract with FC Hoverla, but played only in FC Hoverla Uzhhorod reserves. In the main-team squad Dobrovolskyi made his debut playing as a substitute player in the match against FC Zorya Luhansk on 30 April 2016 in the Ukrainian Premier League.
