= Nasko Milev =

Bulgarian footballer

Personal information
- Full name: Nasko Lenkov Milev
- Date of birth: 18 July 1996 (age 30)
- Place of birth: Plovdiv, Bulgaria
- Height: 1.79 m (5 ft 10 1/2 in)
- Position: Forward

Youth career
- –2011: Spartak Plovdiv
- 2011–2012: CE Premià
- 2012–2014: Botev Plovdiv

Senior career*
Years	Team	Apps	(Gls)
2013–2016	Botev Plovdiv	34	(1)
2017–2018	Slavia Sofia	21	(3)
2018–2019	Vitosha Bistritsa	23	(2)
2019–2020	Lokomotiv Sofia	17	(3)
2021	Džiugas	35	(11)
2022	Panevėžys	34	(7)
2023	Shkëndija	13	(3)
2023–2024	Gjilani	29	(1)
2024–2025	Krumovgrad	34	(2)

International career
2014	Bulgaria U19	3	(0)
2016–2018	Bulgaria U21	9	(1)
- * Club domestic league appearances and goals as of 26 June 2025

Nasko Milev (Bulgarian: Наско Милев; born 18 July 1996) is a Bulgarian professional footballer who plays as a forward.

== Career ==
=== Early career ===
Milev played for the youth teams of Spartak Plovdiv and CE Premià before joining Botev Plovdiv.

=== Botev Plovdiv ===
==== 2013–14 season ====
Milev participated in 25 games for Botev Plovdiv U19 team and scored 13 goals. On 12 October 2013 Nasko made a debut in the first squad during the 3–0 win over PFC Neftochimic Burgas for the Bulgarian Cup.

==== 2014–15 season ====
Milev was promoted to Botev Plovdiv U21 team. Soon after that, on 6 September 2014, he signed his first professional contract with Botev Plovdiv. Milev played his first official game for the first team this season on 23 September 2014. He came on as a substitute during the 0–4 away win against Lokomotiv Mezdra in the first round of the Bulgarian Cup tournament. Ten days later Milev came on as a substitute again. This time he was involved in A Grupa game but even his appearances was unable to prevent the 0–1 loss from CSKA Sofia. On 2 March Nasko Milev came again as a substitute during the final minutes of the 3–0 home win over PFC Marek Dupnitsa. On 16 May Milev was involved in the 3–2 win over CSKA Sofia. He replaced Lazar Marin and played for a few minutes at the end of game. A week later, on 23 May, Nasko Milev replaced Filip Filipov in the 90th minute of the 1–2 away defeat from Beroe Stara Zagora. On 30 June 2015, Milev won the Bulgarian U19 cup with Botev Plovdiv.

==== 2015–16 season ====
Nasko Milev missed the start of season 2015-16 due to an injury. On 12 September he played in the final minutes during the 0–2 home loss from Litex Lovech. On 4 October Milev came on the pitch for the final minutes of the 1–0 win over PFC Montana. On 28 February, Nasko Milev came on as a substitute and in the 89 minute he scored his first ever goal in an official game during the 2–2 draw with PFC Pirin Blagoevgrad. On 6 March 2016, Nasko Milev was included in the starting line-up of Botev Plovdiv for the 1–1 away draw with Beroe Stara Zagora. A week later, on 13 March, he was again in the starting line-up for the 3–1 win over Cherno more Varna. On 29 April, Milev was in the starting line-up for the 2–2 draw with PFC Pirin Blagoevgrad. He played an important part in the first goal for Botev Plovdiv because after his header Martin Toshev scored an own goal.

==== 2016–17 season ====
On 29 June 2016 Milev scored a goal for the 5–0 win over FC Oborishte in a preseason friendly game.

On 6 January 2017 his contract with the team was cancelled, since he believed he hadn't received enough chances to play. Despite the high hopes he failed to impress and scored just a single goal for the first team in 35 games.

=== Slavia Sofia ===
On 17 February 2017, Milev signed with Slavia Sofia. He failed to make impact and was released at the end of the 2017–18 season.

=== Vitosha Bistritsa ===
On 4 July 2018, Milev signed with Vitosha Bistritsa.

=== FC Džiugas ===
In 2021 season was a member of Lithuanian Džiugu. On 8 March 2021 he made his debiut in A Lyga against Hegelmann. On 21 March 2021 he scored his first goal in A Lyga against DFK Dainava.

=== FK Panevėžys ===
In January 2022 he signed with Lithuanian „Panevėžys“ club.

== Career statistics ==
=== Club ===
As of 12 March 2019

Club performance			League		Cup		Continental		Other		Total	
Club	League	Season	Apps	Goals	Apps	Goals	Apps	Goals	Apps	Goals	Apps	Goals
Bulgaria			League		Bulgarian Cup		Europe		Other (Note: Includes Bulgarian Supercup matches.)		Total	
Botev Plovdiv	A Group	2013–14	0	0	1	0	–		–		1	0
Botev Plovdiv	A Group	2014–15	4	0	1	0	0	0	–		5	0
Botev Plovdiv	A Group	2015–16	17	1	0	0	–		–		17	1
Botev Plovdiv	First League	2016–17	13	0	1	0	–		–		14	0
Slavia Sofia	First League	2016–17	8	1	0	0	0	0	–		8	1
Slavia Sofia	First League	2017–18	13	2	4	0	–		–		17	2
Vitosha Bistritsa	First League	2018–19	20	2	1	0	–		–		21	2
Career statistics			75	6	8	0	0	0	0	0	83	6

== International career ==
On 6 June Milev played for Bulgaria U21 during the 0–2 defeat in a friendly game from Norway U21.

== Honours ==
Slavia Sofia

- Bulgarian Cup: 2017–18
