= Rodrigo Henrique =

Brazilian footballer

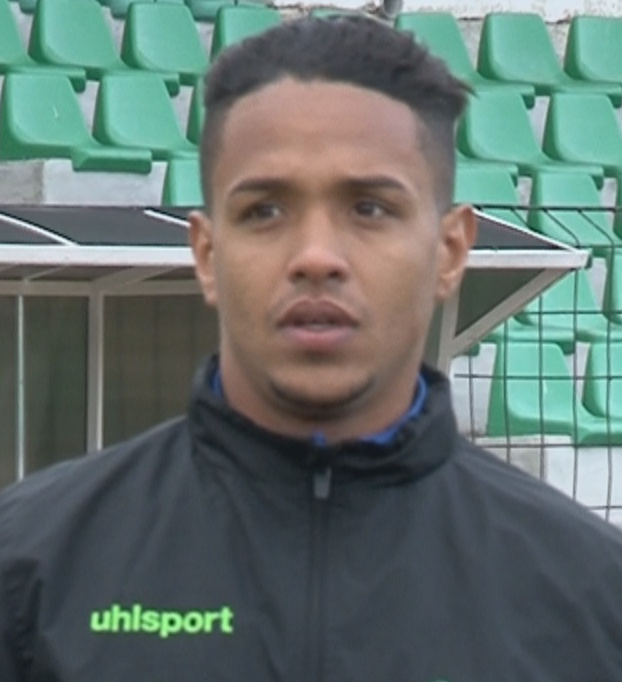

Personal information
- Full name: Rodrigo Henrique Santana da Silva
- Date of birth: 2 July 1993 (age 33)
- Place of birth: Brazil
- Height: 1.78 m (5 ft 10 in)
- Positions: Winger; second striker

Team information
- Current team: Shenzhen Juniors
- Number: 25

Youth career
- 2011–2012: Paraná

Senior career*
Years	Team	Apps	(Gls)
2012–2013	Oeste	2	(0)
2014	América-SP	11	(0)
2015–2016	Atlético Pernambucano	13	(2)
2016–2018	União da Madeira	67	(7)
2019–2022	Cherno More	74	(12)
2022–2025	Meizhou Hakka	107	(17)
2026–	Shenzhen Juniors	18	(5)
- * Club domestic league appearances and goals as of 1 September 2026

Rodrigo Henrique Santana da Silva (born 2 July 1993), known as Rodrigo Henrique, is a Brazilian professional footballer who plays for Chinese club Shenzhen Juniors. He primarily plays as a second striker and as a wide midfielder.

== Club career ==
=== Early career ===
Rodrigo Henrique began his career at Oeste joining the club at the age of 18. He made his professional debut in the Campeonato Paulista on 20 March 2013 in a game against Bragantino.

He signed for América-SP in 2014, after which he joined Atlético Pernambucano in 2015.

=== União da Madeira ===
After one and a half seasons with Atlético, Rodrigo signed for União da Madeira in Portugal. He made his debut in a 1–0 victory over Freamunde in the game of the Taça de Portugal on 31 July 2016.

=== Cherno More ===
On 7 January 2019, Rodrigo signed a contract with Bulgarian club Cherno More Varna.

=== Meizhou Hakka ===
On 21 April 2022, Rodrigo joined Chinese Super League club Meizhou Hakka.

== Career statistics ==
=== Club ===
As of match played 29 May 2026

Appearances and goals by club, season and competition
Club	Season	League			State League		Cup		League Cup		Continental		Other		Total	
Club	Season	Division	Apps	Goals	Apps	Goals	Apps	Goals	Apps	Goals	Apps	Goals	Apps	Goals	Apps	Goals
Oeste	2012	Série C	0	0	—		—		—		—		—		0	0
Oeste	2013	Série B	1	0	1	0	—		—		—		—		2	0
Oeste	Total		1	0	1	0	—		—		—		—		2	0
América-SP	2014	Paulista A3	—		11	0	—		—		—		—		11	0
Atlético Pernambucano	2015	Pernambucano	—		9	2	—		—		—		—		9	2
Atlético Pernambucano	2016	Pernambucano	—		4	0	—		—		—		—		4	0
Atlético Pernambucano	Total		—		13	2	—		—		—		—		13	2
União da Madeira	2016–17	LigaPro	26	3	—		0	0	2 (Note: Taça da Liga matches.)	0	—		—		28	3
União da Madeira	2017–18	LigaPro	29	1	—		2	0	5 (Note: Taça da Liga matches.)	0	—		—		36	1
União da Madeira	2018–19	Campeonato de Portugal	12	3	—		1	0	0	0	—		—		13	3
União da Madeira	Total		67	7	—		3	0	7	0	—		—		77	7
Cherno More	2018–19	Bulgarian First League	10	0	—		0	0	—		—		—		10	0
Cherno More	2019–20	Bulgarian First League	26	5	—		2	1	—		—		—		28	6
Cherno More	2020–21	Bulgarian First League	24	3	—		2	0	—		—		—		26	3
Cherno More	2021–22	Bulgarian First League	14	4	—		2	0	—		—		—		16	4
Cherno More	Total		74	12	—		6	1	—		—		—		80	13
Meizhou Hakka	2022	Chinese Super League	30	5	—		1	0	—		—		—		31	5
Meizhou Hakka	2023	Chinese Super League	25	5	—		1	0	—		—		—		26	5
Meizhou Hakka	2024	Chinese Super League	23	2	—		0	0	—		—		—		23	2
Meizhou Hakka	2025	Chinese Super League	29	5	—		0	0	—		—		—		29	5
Meizhou Hakka	Total		107	17	—		2	0	—		—		—		109	17
Shenzhen Juniors	2026	China League One	10	4	—		0	0	—		—		—		10	4
Career statistics			259	40	14	2	11	1	7	0	0	0	0	0	291	43
