= 2021 Albanian Cup final =

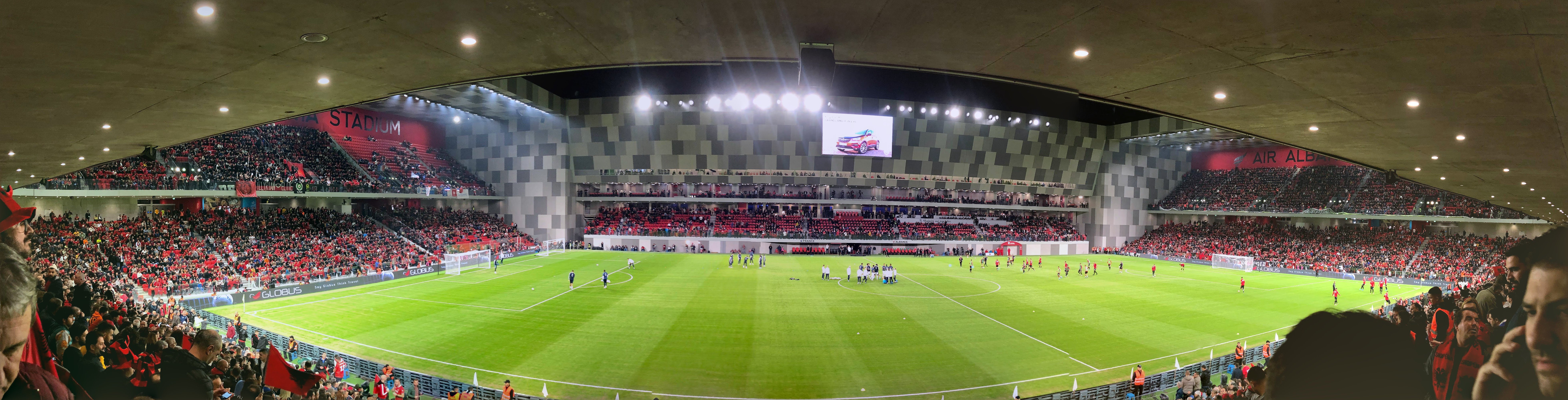
- The match was played at Arena Kombëtare in Tirana
- Event: 2020–21 Albanian Cup
Skënderbeu	Vllaznia
0	1
- Date: 31 May 2021
- Venue: Arena Kombëtare, Tirana
- Referee: Juxhin Xhaja
- Attendance: 1,000

The 2021 Albanian Cup final was a football match which was played on 31 May 2021 to decide the winner of the 2020–21 Albanian Cup, the 69th edition of Albanian Cup. The match was played between Skënderbeu and Vllaznia at the Arena Kombëtare in Tirana. Vllaznia won the match 1–0 to earn their seventh Albanian Cup title.

== Match ==
=== Details ===
31 May 2021
19:00

Skënderbeu	0−1	Vllaznia
		Da Silva 39'

Arena Kombëtare, Tirana
Attendance: 1,000
Referee: Juxhin Xhaja
