= Vasil Panayotov =

Bulgarian footballer

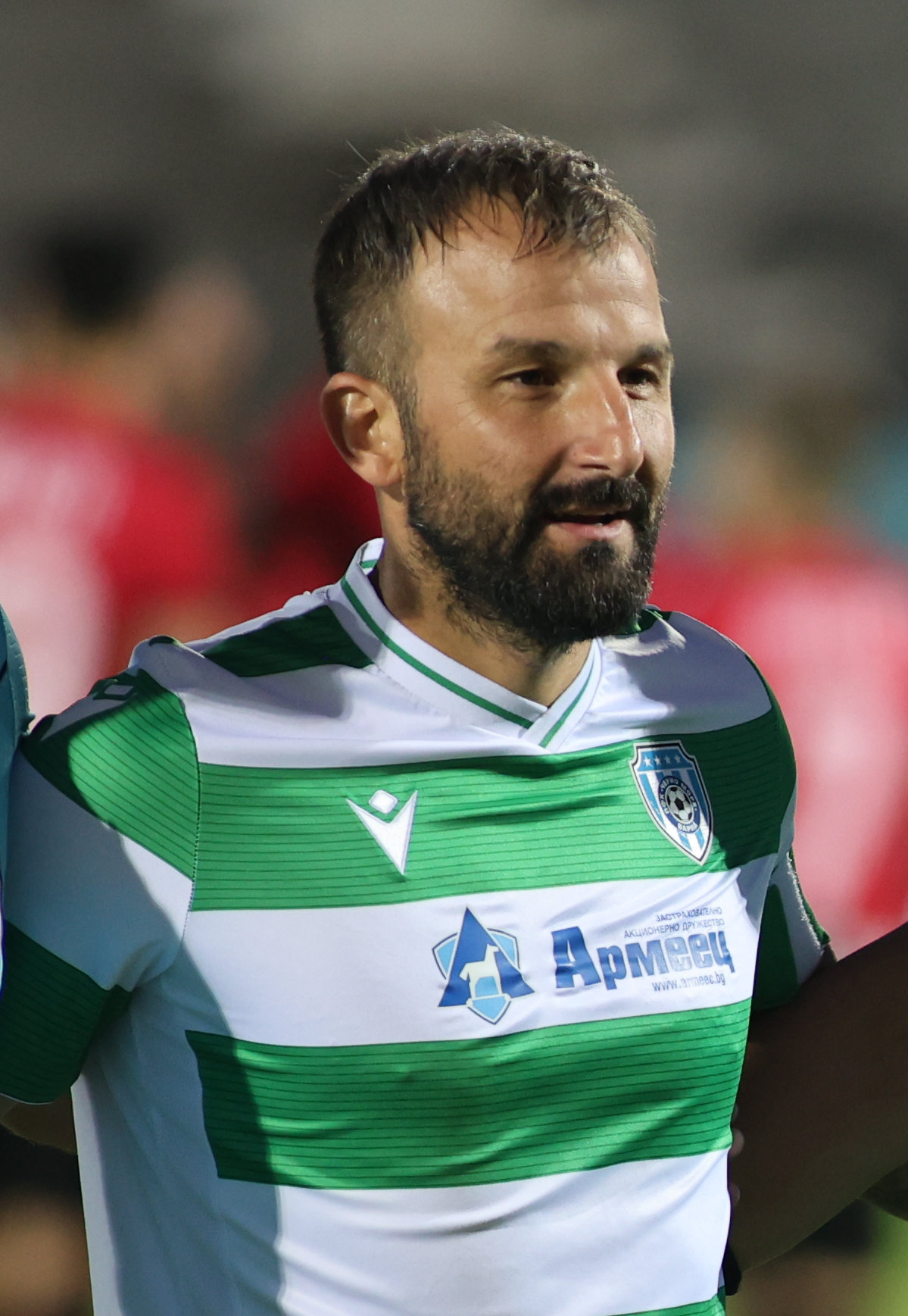

Personal information
- Full name: Vasil Kostadinov Panayotov
- Date of birth: 16 July 1990 (age 36)
- Place of birth: Gotse Delchev, Bulgaria
- Height: 1.77 m (5 ft 10 in)
- Position: Central midfielder

Team information
- Current team: Cherno More
- Number: 71

Youth career
- 1996–2003: Pirin Gotse Delchev
- 2003–2007: Pirin Blagoevgrad
- 2007–2009: Levski Sofia

Senior career*
Years	Team	Apps	(Gls)
2009–2010	Levski Sofia	0	(0)
2009	→ Volov Shumen (loan)	6	(0)
2010	Pirin Gotse Delchev	15	(1)
2011–2012	Bansko	19	(2)
2012–2014	Pirin Gotse Delchev	63	(5)
2014–2015	Ayia Napa	30	(5)
2015–2016	Zawisza Bydgoszcz	24	(4)
2016	Beroe Stara Zagora	3	(0)
2017	Stal Mielec	15	(0)
2017–2018	Levski Sofia	25	(3)
2018–	Cherno More	260	(23)

International career^{‡}
2019–2025	Bulgaria	6	(1)
- * Club domestic league appearances and goals as of 8 November 2026 (UTC) ‡ National team caps and goals as of 4 September 2025 (UTC)

Vasil Panayotov (Bulgarian: Васил Панайотов; born 16 July 1990) is a Bulgarian professional footballer who plays as a central midfielder for First League club Cherno More Varna, which he captains.

== Club career ==
Born in Gotse Delchev, Panayotov began his youth career with hometown club Pirin, before moving to join the youth academy of Levski Sofia at age of 17. He played regularly for the under-19s, but never made a first team appearance.

Panayotov went on loan to B PFG side Volov Shumen at the start of the 2009–10 season.

In June 2010, he moved to Pirin Gotse Delchev. He scored once in 16 appearances, before moving to Bansko in January 2011.

In June 2016, Panayotov signed with Beroe Stara Zagora but was released in December.

On 16 January 2017, Panayotov signed with Stal Mielec.

On 19 June 2017, Panayotov moved to Levski Sofia. He left the club at the end of the 2017–18 season when his contract expired.

On 7 August 2018, Panayotov signed for Cherno More Varna on a two-year contract. On 17 August, he made his official debut in a 0–0 home draw against Beroe Stara Zagora. On 4 May 2019, he scored his first goal for the club in a 1–3 away loss against CSKA Sofia.

On 16 April 2025, Panayotov signed a one-year contract extension with the club. Following Daniel Dimov's retirement, he inherited the captain's armband ahead of the 2025–26 season. On 29 June 2026, he signed a new one-year contract with Cherno More.

== International career ==
On 10 September 2019, Panayotov earned his first cap for Bulgaria, coming on as a late second-half substitute for Kristian Dimitrov in the 1–3 away loss against Ireland in a friendly match. On 18 November 2024, he scored his first international goal in a 1–1 home draw against Belarus in the 2024–25 UEFA Nations League C.

International goals

Scores and results list Bulgaria's goal tally first.

No.	Date	Venue	Opponent	Score	Result	Competition
1.	18 November 2024	Natsionalen stadion Vasil Levski, Bulgaria	Belarus	1–0	1–1	2024–25 UEFA Nations League C

== Career statistics ==
=== Club ===
As of 22 August 2026

Club	League	Season	League		Cup		Continental		Other		Total	
Club	League	Season	Apps	Goals	Apps	Goals	Apps	Goals	Apps	Goals	Apps	Goals
Volov Shumen	Bulgarian Second League	2009–10	6	0	0	0	—		—		6	0
Pirin GD	Bulgarian Second League	2010–11	15	1	0	0	—		—		15	1
Bansko	Bulgarian Second League	2010–11	11	2	0	0	—		—		11	2
Bansko	Bulgarian Second League	2011–12	8	0	0	0	—		—		8	0
Bansko	Total		19	2	0	0	0	0	0	0	19	2
Pirin GD	Bulgarian First League	2012–13	29	1	4	0	—		—		33	1
Pirin GD	Bulgarian First League	2013–14	34	4	2	0	—		—		36	4
Pirin GD	Total		63	5	6	0	0	0	0	0	69	5
Ayia Napa	Cypriot First Division	2014–15	30	5	0	0	—		—		30	5
Zawisza Bydgoszcz	Polish I liga	2015–16	24	4	3	0	—		—		27	4
Beroe	Bulgarian First League	2016–17	3	0	1	0	3	0	—		7	0
Stal Mielec	Polish I liga	2016–17	15	0	0	0	—		—		15	0
Levski Sofia	Bulgarian First League	2017–18	25	3	4	0	—		1 (Note: Europa League play-off)	1	30	4
Cherno More	Bulgarian First League	2018–19	31	1	3	0	—		—		34	1
Cherno More	Bulgarian First League	2019–20	28	0	2	0	—		—		30	0
Cherno More	Bulgarian First League	2020–21	29	4	1	0	—		1 (Note: Europa League play-off)	0	31	4
Cherno More	Bulgarian First League	2021–22	24	1	2	0	—		—		26	1
Cherno More	Bulgarian First League	2022–23	32	4	4	1	—		—		36	5
Cherno More	Bulgarian First League	2023–24	34	6	1	0	—		—		35	6
Cherno More	Bulgarian First League	2024–25	35	2	5	1	2	0	—		42	3
Cherno More	Bulgarian First League	2025–26	33	3	2	0	2	0	—		37	3
Cherno More	Bulgarian First League	2026–27	6	1	0	0	—		—		6	1
Cherno More	Total		252	22	20	2	4	0	1	0	277	24
Career total			452	42	34	2	7	0	2	1	495	45

=== International ===
National team	Year	Apps	Goals
Bulgaria	2019	1	0
Bulgaria	2024	4	1
Bulgaria	2025	1	0
Total		6	1
