= Jorginho (footballer, born 1988) =

Brazilian-Portuguese footballer

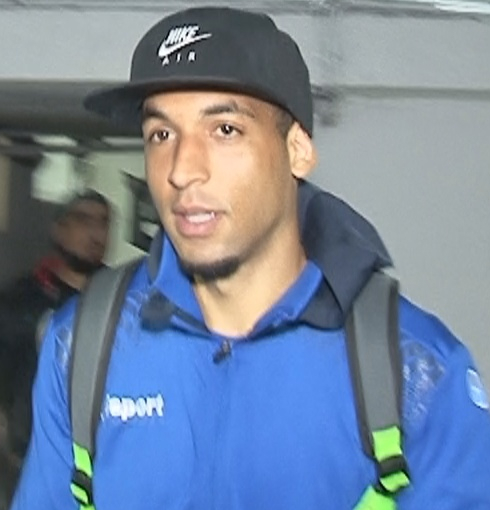

Personal information
- Full name: Jorge Vinícius Oliveira Alves
- Date of birth: 3 May 1988 (age 38)
- Place of birth: Pereira Barreto, Brazil
- Height: 1.81 m (5 ft 11 1/2 in)
- Position: Forward

Team information
- Current team: Sparta Esporte Clube
- Number: 9

Youth career
- 2004–2007: Santos
- 2008: Rio Preto

Senior career*
Years	Team	Apps	(Gls)
2009	Rio Preto		
2009–2010	Guaçuano		
2011–2014	Bravos do Maquis	14	(4)
2014–2015	Eléctrico	18	(7)
2015–2016	Moura	29	(20)
2016	Mafra	13	(2)
2016–2017	União de Leiria	18	(11)
2017–2018	Farense	39	(16)
2018–2019	Cherno More	31	(4)
2020	Doxa Katokopias	8	(0)
2020–2021	Torreense	9	(0)
2022	Costa Rica	14	(1)
- * Club domestic league appearances and goals as of 1 January 2023

Jorge Vinícius Oliveira Alves (born 3 May 1988), known as Jorginho, is a Brazilian football player who plays as a forward for Sparta de São Gotardo MG in Brazil. He also holds Portuguese citizenship.

== Club career ==
He made his professional debut in the Segunda Liga for Mafra on 7 February 2016 in a game against Farense.

On 26 June 2018, Jorginho signed with Bulgarian club Cherno More. On 20 July 2018, he made his official debut in a 2–1 home win against Botev Vratsa.

On 14 December 2019 Jorginho transfers to Doxa in Cyprus.

Jorginho returned to Portuguese football, for Torreense in the season 2020/21.

On 2021 after a long time away from the country, Jorginho returns to Brazil, this time to play with Cabofriense in the second division of the Rio championship, in the same season he transferred to Tubarão, in Santa Catarina to play in the second state division.

On 2 January 2022 Jorginho is signed by the Brazilian club Costa Rica.
