= Ilias Hassani =

Algerian footballer (born 1995)

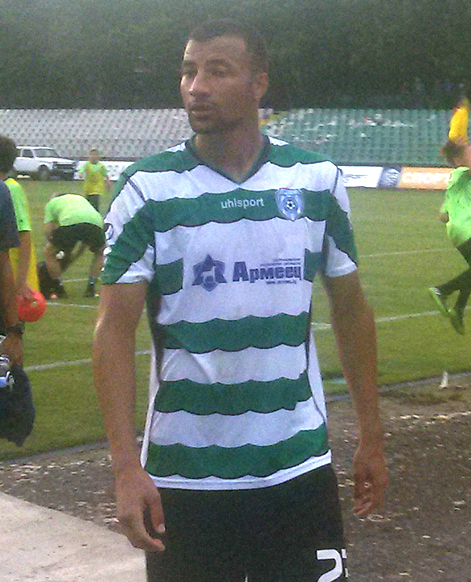

Personal information
- Full name: Ilias Hassani
- Date of birth: November 8, 1995 (age 31)
- Place of birth: Toulouse, France
- Height: 1.86 m (6 ft 1 in)
- Position: Centre back

Youth career
- 2002–2005: US Bagatelle
- 2005–2014: Toulouse

Senior career*
Years	Team	Apps	(Gls)
2012–2015	Toulouse B	50	(0)
2014–2015	Toulouse	1	(0)
2015–2016	Bordeaux B	15	(0)
2015–2016	Bordeaux	1	(0)
2016–2017	Vereya	23	(0)
2017–2018	Cherno More	45	(1)
2019	Al-Gharafa	0	(0)
2019	→ Al-Kharaitiyat (loan)	5	(0)
2019–2020	Arda Kardzhali	12	(1)
2020–2021	Beroe	22	(0)
2021–2022	Al-Shahania	0	(0)
2023	Zhetysu	9	(0)

International career^{‡}
2013	France U18	2	(0)
2017–	Algeria	3	(0)
- * Club domestic league appearances and goals as of 11 July 2023 ‡ National team caps and goals as of 17 April 2023

Ilias Hassani (born 8 November 1995) is an Algerian professional footballer who plays as a centre back.

== Career ==
A youth product of Toulouse, Hassani made his Ligue 1 debut on 11 February 2014 as a 50th-minute substitute, replacing Dany Maury during a 1–3 home defeat against SC Bastia.

On 16 August 2016, Hassani signed a one-year contract with Bulgarian club Vereya Stara Zagora, where he made 23 league appearances during the 2016–17 season.

On 15 June 2017, Hassani moved to fellow First League club Cherno More Varna. On 15 July, he made his debut in a 1–0 home win over Vitosha Bistritsa. On 28 July 2017, he scored his first career goal in a 1–0 home win over Dunav Ruse, a stunning run into the box followed by a left-footed shot from a small angle. In July 2020, Hassani joined Beroe Stara Zagora.

== International career ==
On 2 September 2017, Hassani made his debut for Algeria in а 1–3 away defeat by Zambia, a 2018 FIFA World Cup qualifier.

== Career statistics ==
As of 13 April 2019

Club	Season	League		Cup		League Cup		Continental		Total	
Club	Season	App	Goals	App	Goals	App	Goals	App	Goals	App	Goals
Toulouse	2013–14	1	0	0	0	0	0	–		1	0
Bordeaux	2015–16	1	0	0	0	0	0	–		1	0
Vereya	2016–17	23	0	3	0	–				26	0
Cherno More	2017–18	32	1	1	0	–				33	1
Cherno More	2018–19	14	0	2	0	–				16	0
Al-Gharafa	2018–19	0	0	0	0	0	0	–		0	0
Al-Kharaitiyat	2018–19	5	0	0	0	0	0	–		5	0
Arda Kardzhali	2019-20	12	1	2	0	0	0	–		15	0
Total		76	1	6	0	0	0	0	0	82	1
