= Hugo Konongo =

Association football player (born 1992)

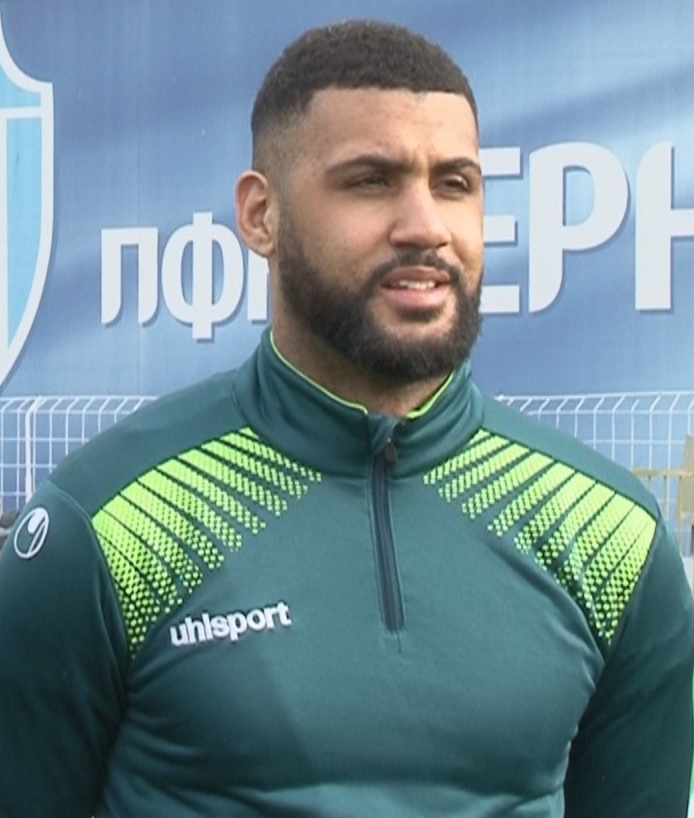

Personal information
- Date of birth: 14 February 1992 (age 34)
- Place of birth: Toulouse, France
- Height: 1.84 m (6 ft 1/2 in)
- Position: Left-back

Youth career
- 2010–2012: Bordeaux

Senior career*
Years	Team	Apps	(Gls)
2010–2012	Bordeaux B	29	(1)
2012–2014	Evian B	33	(2)
2014–2015	Clermont	19	(0)
2014–2015	Clermont B	5	(0)
2015–2016	US Créteil	13	(0)
2016–2017	Sedan	10	(0)
2017	Paulhan-Pézenas	4	(0)
2018–2019	Cherno More	37	(0)
2019–2020	Sepsi OSK	7	(0)
2020–2021	Béziers	7	(0)
2021–2022	St-Pryvé St-Hilaire	18	(0)

International career
2015–2019	Congo	4	(0)
- * Club domestic league appearances and goals

Hugo Konongo (born 14 February 1992) is a former professional footballer who played as a defender. Born in France, he played for the Congo national team.

== Club career ==
Konongo joined Clermont Foot in 2014. He made his full professional debut in a 1–0 Ligue 2 victory over Le Havre in September 2014.

On 8 January 2018, Konongo joined the Bulgarian top league team Cherno More on trial. A month later, he was approved and signed a professional contract. On 17 February, he made his debut in a 1–4 home defeat by Beroe.

On 11 July 2019, Konongo signed a one-year contract with Romanian club Sepsi OSK. On 17 January 2020, he was released by Sepsi OSK. In June 2020, Konongo joined French team Béziers.
