= Plamen Dimov (footballer) =

Bulgarian footballer

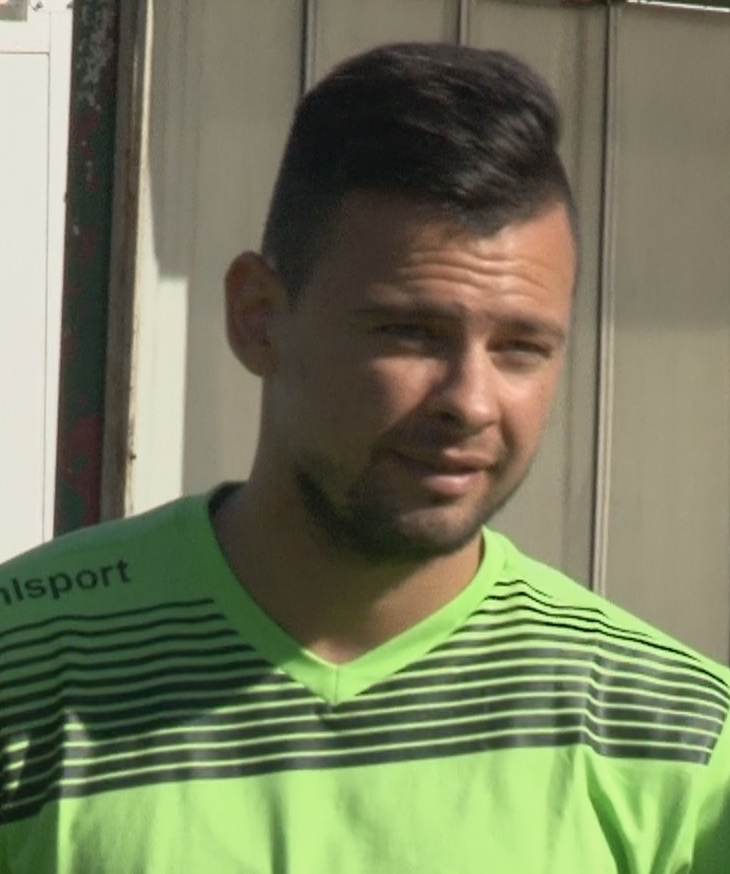

Personal information
- Full name: Plamen Diyanov Dimov
- Date of birth: 29 October 1990 (age 36)
- Place of birth: Burgas, Bulgaria
- Height: 1.81 m (5 ft 11 in)
- Position: Centre-back

Team information
- Current team: Nesebar
- Number: 5

Youth career
- Chernomorets Pomorie

Senior career*
Years	Team	Apps	(Gls)
2009–2011	Chernomorets Pomorie	40	(4)
2012–2013	Chernomorets Burgas	17	(0)
2013–2014	Levski Sofia	25	(1)
2015	Kaisar	2	(1)
2015	Shakhter Karagandy	10	(2)
2016	Altai Semey	17	(1)
2017–2018	Botev Plovdiv	25	(0)
2018–2019	Cherno More	25	(1)
2019–2020	Okzhetpes	33	(1)
2021	Andijon	23	(0)
2022	FK Riteriai	22	(1)
2022–2023	Spartak Varna	22	(1)
2023–2024	Etar	14	(0)
2024	Aiolikos	3	(0)
2024–	Nesebar	49	(8)

International career
2010–2012	Bulgaria U21	13	(0)
- * Club domestic league appearances and goals as of 10 January 2026

Plamen Dimov (Bulgarian: Пламен Димов; born 29 October 1990) is a Bulgarian professional footballer who plays as a centre-back for Bulgarian Second League club Nesebar. His twin brother Galin Dimov is also a footballer. They are sons of the distinguished Bulgarian footballer Diyan Petkov.

== Career ==
Dimov made his A PFG debut for Chernomorets Burgas on 10 March 2012 in a game against Lokomotiv Plovdiv.

On 9 January 2013, Dimov signed with Levski Sofia. He was released from the team in late January 2015. Later that month he put pen to paper on a two-year contract with Kazakhstan Premier League club Kaisar. Quickly establishing himself as a starter, Dimov's season was cut short after making just two league appearances due to sustaining an anterior cruciate ligament injury during a training session.

=== Botev Plovdiv ===
In February 2017, Dimov signed with Botev Plovdiv but was unable to play until the 2017–18 season due to problems with the registration.

On 29 June 2017, Dimov made his official debut for Botev Plovdiv during the 3–1 away win over Partizani Tirana in the first qualifying round of UEFA Europa League. On 20 July Dimov scored his first goal for Botev Plovdiv during the 4–0 win over Beitar Jerusalem in the second qualifying round of UEFA Europa League.

Dimov left the club at the end of the 2017–18 season.

=== Cherno More ===
In June 2018, Dimov signed with Cherno More. On 30 July, he made his official debut in a 2–2 away draw against Levski Sofia.

=== Spartak Varna ===
In August 2022, Dimov joined Spartak Varna.

=== Etar Veliko Tarnovo ===
In July 2023, he moved to newly promoted Etar Veliko Tarnovo.

== Honours ==
Botev Plovdiv

- Bulgarian Supercup: 2017
