= Miroslav Enchev =

Bulgarian footballer

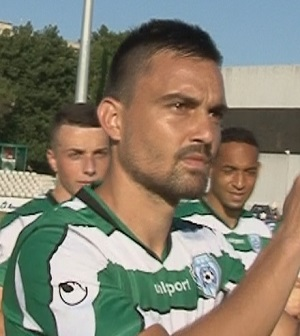

Personal information
- Full name: Miroslav Tanev Enchev
- Date of birth: 8 August 1991 (age 35)
- Place of birth: Stara Zagora, Bulgaria
- Height: 1.79 m (5 ft 10 in)
- Positions: Centre-back; right-back

Team information
- Current team: Dimitrovgrad

Senior career*
Years	Team	Apps	(Gls)
2009–2012	Beroe	20	(0)
2013	Neftochimic 1986	2	(0)
2013–2016	Botev Galabovo	65	(5)
2016–2017	Vereya	31	(0)
2018–2021	Cherno More	52	(2)
2021–2022	Beroe	3	(0)
2022–2023	Zagorets	2	(0)
2023–2024	Yambol	19	(3)
2024	Svilengrad	14	(0)
2025	Gigant Saedinenie	30	(1)
2026–	Dimitrovgrad	0	(0)
- * Club domestic league appearances and goals as of 09:23, 15 December 2025 (UTC)

Miroslav Enchev (Bulgarian: Мирослав Енчев; born 8 August 1991) is a Bulgarian professional footballer who plays as a defender for Dimitrovgrad.

== Career ==
On 16 January 2018 Enchev joined Cherno More Varna from Vereya Stara Zagora. On 17 February, he made his debut in a 1–4 home defeat by Beroe.

== Honours ==
Beroe Stara Zagora

- Bulgarian Cup: 2009–10
