= Daniel Dimov =

Bulgarian professional footballer

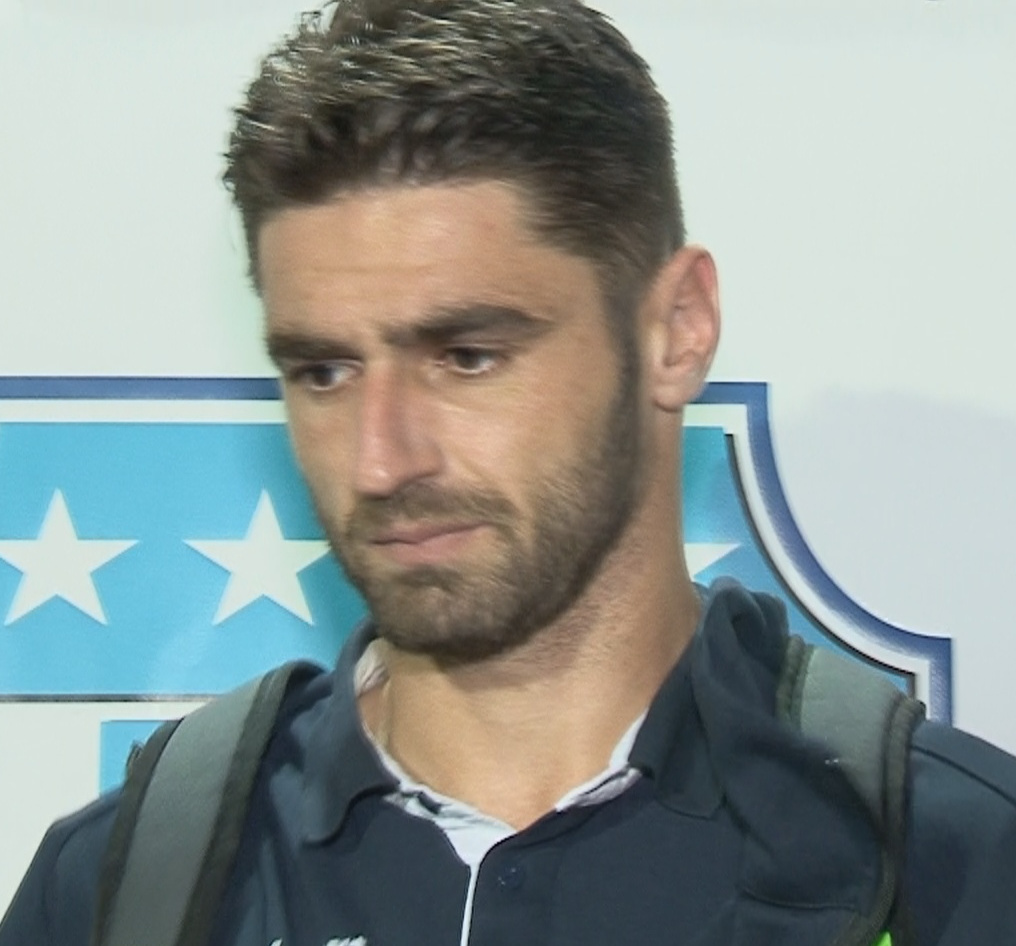

Personal information
- Full name: Daniel Svetoslavov Dimov
- Date of birth: 21 January 1989 (age 37)
- Place of birth: Shabla, Bulgaria
- Height: 1.88 m (6 ft 2 in)
- Positions: Centre back; defensive midfielder

Youth career
- 1999–2002: FC Shabla
- 2002–2008: Cherno More

Senior career*
Years	Team	Apps	(Gls)
2006–2010	Cherno More	54	(3)
2011–2014	Levski Sofia	73	(8)
2014–2015	Maccabi Petah Tikva	28	(2)
2015–2016	Denizlispor	21	(1)
2016–2017	Manisaspor	40	(6)
2018	Cherno More	18	(1)
2018–2019	Boluspor	21	(1)
2019–2025	Cherno More	135	(6)
Total		390	(28)

International career
2007	Bulgaria U21	1	(0)
2021	Bulgaria	2	(0)
- * Club domestic league appearances and goals

Daniel Dimov (Bulgarian: Даниел Димов; born 21 January 1989) is a former Bulgarian professional footballer. Originally a defensive midfielder, in the last years of his career he has been used mostly as a centre back.

Dimov came through the academy system at Cherno More Varna and made over 60 appearances for the first team before signing with Levski Sofia in December 2010. He then made the move to Israel to sign for Maccabi Petah Tikva in July 2014. After success there, Dimov joined Turkish club Denizlispor a year later. In July 2016, after one season at Denizlispor, he signed with Manisaspor. In February 2018 returned to Cherno More, spending six months there. In August 2018 he moved to Boluspor, before returning again to his first club a year later. He ended his career at the end of 2024–25 season.

== Club career ==
=== Cherno More ===
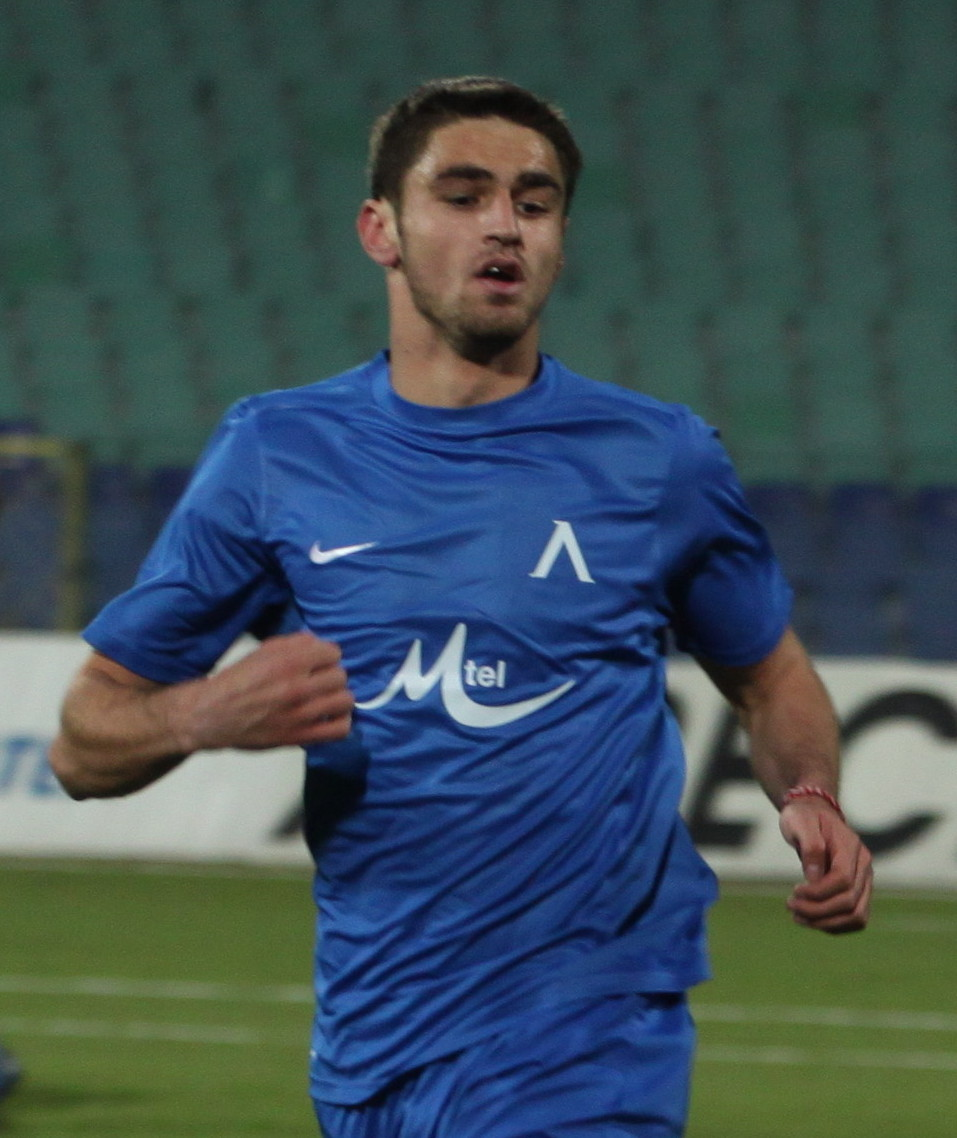
Dimov with Levski Sofia in 2011

Dimov began his career at Cherno More Varna, progressing through the club's youth system. He made his debut during the 2006–07 season, in a 6–0 away win over Chernomorets Burgas Sofia on 15 September 2006, coming on as a substitute for Slavi Zhekov. On 14 July 2007, Dimov scored his first goal for a 3–0 home win against Makedonija Gjorče Petrov in the second round of the Intertoto Cup.

In the 2009–10 A Group season he earned 17 appearances in the league. On 1 March 2010, Dimov scored his first league goal in a 2–0 home win against Chernomorets Burgas. On 4 April, Dimov hit his second goal of the season against Sportist Svoge in a 3–0 win.

On 2 October 2010, Dimov scored his third goal for Cherno More, netting in the 40th minute of their 1–3 away loss against Litex Lovech. On 23 October, he made his 50th appearance for the team in the A Group in a 0–4 loss against Montana.

=== Levski Sofia ===
After weeks of speculation, the transfer saga of Dimov finally ended on 26 December 2010 when Levski Sofia announced on the official website that Cherno More and Levski had reached an agreement for the transfer of Dimov. In Sofia, Daniel signed a three-a-half-year contract with Levski, keeping him there until 30 June 2014.

In June 2014 Dimov refused to renew his contract with Levski and decided to leave after 3 years of playing in which he played in 73 appearances and scored 8 goals in total.

=== Return to Cherno More ===
Having played 3 1/2 years abroad, on 13 February 2018 Dimov returned to his first club Cherno More, signing a short-term contract. On 23 February, he made his second debut in a 0–0 away draw against CSKA Sofia.

=== Boluspor ===
On 7 August 2018, Dimov signed with Turkish club Boluspor for two years.

=== 2nd return to Cherno More ===
On 28 August 2019, Dimov signed again with Cherno More.

== Career statistics ==
Club	Season	League		Cup		Europe		Other		Total	
Club	Season	Apps	Goals	Apps	Goals	Apps	Goals	Apps	Goals	Apps	Goals
Cherno More	2006–07	4	0	0	0	–		–		4	0
Cherno More	2007–08	6	0	1	0	4 (Note: Appearance(s) in UEFA Intertoto Cup)	1	–		11	1
Cherno More	2008–09	12	0	0	0	0	0	–		12	0
Cherno More	2009–10	17	2	3	0	2 (Note: Appearance(s) in UEFA Europa League)	0	–		22	2
Cherno More	2010–11	15	1	2	0	–		–		17	1
Cherno More	Total	54	3	6	0	6	1	0	0	66	4
Levski Sofia	2010–11	11	0	0	0	0	0	–		11	0
Levski Sofia	2011–12	14	2	2	1	1	0	–		17	3
Levski Sofia	2012–13	19	1	7	0	0	0	–		26	1
Levski Sofia	2013–14	29	5	6	0	1	0	–		36	5
Levski Sofia	Total	73	8	15	1	2	0	0	0	90	9
Maccabi Petah Tikva	2014–15	28	2	6	0	–		–		34	2
Denizlispor	2015–16	21	1	0	0	–		–		21	1
Manisaspor	2016–17	27	5	0	0	–		–		27	5
Manisaspor	2017–18	13	1	1	0	–		–		14	1
Manisaspor	Total	40	6	1	0	0	0	0	0	41	6
Cherno More	2017–18	15	1	–		–		1	0	16	1
Cherno More	2018–19	3	0	0	0	–		–		3	0
Cherno More	Total	18	1	0	0	0	0	1	0	19	1
Boluspor	2018–19	21	1	2	0	–		–		23	1
Cherno More	2019–20	19	1	1	0	–		–		20	1
Cherno More	2020–21	26	0	1	1	–		1	0	28	1
Cherno More	2021–22	24	1	0	0	–		–		24	1
Cherno More	2022–23	13	1	4	0	–		–		17	1
Cherno More	2023–24	27	3	0	0	–		–		27	3
Cherno More	2020–21	26	0	3	0	2 (Note: Appearance(s) in UEFA Conference League)	0	–		31	0
Cherno More	Total	135	6	9	1	2	0	1	0	147	7
Career totals		390	28	39	2	10	1	2	0	441	31

== International career ==
On 1 October 2010, Dimov received his first call-up to the Bulgaria national team for the Euro 2012 qualifying match against Wales and the friendly match against Saudi Arabia from Lothar Matthäus. However, he did not feature in any of these games. He made his debut on 25 March 2021 in a World Cup qualifier against Switzerland.
