= 2016–17 PFC Cherno More Varna season =

Cherno More
2016–17 season
- Chairman: Marin Mitev
- Manager: Georgi Ivanov
- First League: 6th
- Bulgarian Cup: Quarterfinals (knocked out by Litex)
- Top goalscorer: League: Marek Kuzma (10); All: Marek Kuzma (10)
- Highest home attendance: 2,550 (vs CSKA Sofia, 19 February 2017)
- Lowest home attendance: 70 (vs Lokomotiv Gorna Oryahovitsa, 29 November 2016)
- Average home league attendance: 814
- Biggest win: 3–1 (vs Pirin Blagoevgrad, 31 July 2016); 3–1 (vs Neftochimic, 30 October 2016 and 19 March 2017)
- Biggest defeat: 0–4 (vs Ludogorets Razgrad, 1 May 2017)
Home colours	Away colours	Third colours
- All statistics correct as of 31 May 2017.

This page covers all relevant details regarding PFC Cherno More Varna for all official competitions inside the 2016–17 season. These are the Bulgarian First Professional League and Bulgarian Cup. The team's head coach Nikola Spasov has signed a one-year contract extension immediately after the 2015–16 season, but left the club by mutual consent a few weeks later. Subsequently, on 21 June 2016 the club appointed Georgi Ivanov as new head coach, which will be his second spell at the helm of Cherno More.

As the club's ground, Ticha Stadium, was not certified to host league games, the team will play all of its home games at Kavarna Stadium in Kavarna at least until the repair works at Ticha are completed.

== Transfers ==
=== In ===
Date	Pos.	Name	From	Fee
1 June 2016	FW	(Bulgaria) Georgi Andonov	Beroe	Free
3 June 2016	DF	(Bulgaria) Georgi Radev	Sozopol	Free
8 June 2016	GK	(Bulgaria) Emil Mihaylov	Etar	Free
9 June 2016	MF	(Bulgaria) Aleksandar Tsvetkov	Litex	Free
14 June 2016	MF	(Bulgaria) Ivan Kokonov	Montana	Free
27 June 2016	MF	(Czech Republic) Jan Malík	(Czech Republic) Zbrojovka Brno	Free
27 June 2016	DF	(Czech Republic) Ondřej Sukup	(Czech Republic) Baník Ostrava	Free
28 June 2016	DF	(Brazil) Paulo Henrique	(Brazil) Tigres do Brasil	Free
29 June 2016	DF	(Bulgaria) Daniel Zlatkov	Botev Plovdiv	Free
12 July 2016	MF	(Portugal) Hugo Seco	(Portugal) Académica	Free
20 July 2016	FW	(Slovakia) Marek Kuzma	(Slovakia) Zlaté Moravce	Free
12 September 2016	GK	(Czech Republic) Přemysl Kovář	(Israel) Hapoel Haifa	Free
17 December 2016	MF	(Bulgaria) Borislav Baldzhiyski	Slavia Sofia	Free
5 January 2017	GK	(Czech Republic) Vojtěch Šrom	(Czech Republic) Baník Ostrava	Free
6 February 2017	MF	(Spain) Pirulo	(Slovakia) Senica	Free
7 February 2017	MF	(Czech Republic) Filip Hlúpik	(Czech Republic) Slovácko	Free

=== Out ===
Date	Pos.	Name	To	Fee
4 May 2016	DF	(Bulgaria) Borislav Stoychev	(Cyprus) Ethnikos Achna	Free
4 May 2016	MF	(Serbia) Ivan Marković	(South Korea) Gyeongnam	Free
20 May 2016	MF	(Bulgaria) Simeon Raykov	Lokomotiv Plovdiv	Free
20 May 2016	DF	(Portugal) Pedro Eugénio	Vereya	Free
25 May 2016	MF	(Cape Verde) Sténio	Botev Plovdiv	Free
25 May 2016	MF	(Netherlands) Marc Klok	(England) Oldham Athletic	Free
25 May 2016	MF	(Martinique) Mathias Coureur	(Georgia (country)) Dinamo Tbilisi	Free
25 May 2016	DF	(Mali) Mamoutou Coulibaly	Free agent	End of contract
25 May 2016	MF	(Bulgaria) Ivan Valchanov	Neftochimic	Free
25 May 2016	FW	(Bulgaria) Zhivko Petkov	Neftochimic	Free
2 June 2016	GK	(Bulgaria) Georgi Kitanov	CSKA Sofia	Undisclosed
4 July 2016	MF	(Bulgaria) Bekir Rasim	Pomorie	Free
18 July 2016	DF	(Brazil) Paulo Henrique	Free agent	Released
20 July 2016	MF	(Bulgaria) Andreas Vasev	Montana	Free
20 July 2016	DF	(Bulgaria) Georgi Radev	Sozopol	Free
7 September 2016	DF	(Bulgaria) Daniel Zlatkov	Botev Plovdiv	Free
8 September 2016	FW	(Bulgaria) Georgi Andonov	Vereya	Free
14 December 2016	GK	(Serbia) Aleksandar Čanović	Free agent	Released
15 December 2016	MF	(Bulgaria) Vladislav Romanov	Neftochimic	Free
15 December 2016	MF	(Czech Republic) Jan Malík	(Poland) Legionovia Legionowo	Free
23 December 2016	GK	(Czech Republic) Přemysl Kovář	(Czech Republic) Slavia Prague	Undisclosed
31 January 2017	MF	(Portugal) Hugo Seco	(Portugal) Feirense	Undisclosed
1 February 2017	MF	(Bulgaria) Iliyan Nedelchev	Kaliakra	Free

== Squad information ==
N	Pos.	Nat.	Name	Age	EU	Since	App	Goals	Ends	Transfer fee	Previous Club	Notes
3	CM	(Bulgaria)	~~Daniel Georgiev~~	34	EU	2013	195	17	2017	Free	Lokomotiv Plovdiv	(Note: Georgiev made 101 appearances and scored 12 goals during his first spell at the club between 2007 and 2011.) (Note: Player left the club in May 2017.)
4	LB	(Bulgaria)	~~Mihail Venkov~~ (y)	33	EU	2013	124	1	2017	Free	CSKA Sofia	
5	RB	(Bulgaria)	Stefan Stanchev	28	EU	2013	78	1	2017	Free	Minyor Pernik	
6	CM	(Bulgaria)	Aleksandar Tsvetkov	26	EU	2016	31	2	2017	Free	Litex	
7	RW	(Portugal)	~~Hugo Seco~~	28	EU	2016	18	2	2017	Free	(Portugal) Académica	(Note: Player left the club in January 2017.)
8	DM	(Czech Republic)	~~Jan Malík~~	24	EU	2016	10	0	2018	Free	(Czech Republic) Zbrojovka Brno	(Note: Player left the club in December 2016.)
9	FW	(The Gambia)	~~Bacari~~	29	EU	2013	76	19	2017	Free	(Spain) L'Hospitalet	
10	AM	(Bulgaria)	Ilian Iliev	17	EU	2016	3	0		Youth system	Cherno More Academy	
11	LW	(Bulgaria)	~~Vladislav Romanov~~	28	EU	2016	19	0	2018	Free	(Greece) Trikala	
13	LW	(Bulgaria)	Ivan Kokonov	25	EU	2016	88	11	2019	Free	Montana	(Note: Kokonov made 56 appearances and scored 8 goals during his first spell at the club between 2013 and 2015.)
15	CB	(Bulgaria)	~~Trayan Trayanov~~	29	EU	2015	34	2	2017	Free	Lokomotiv Sofia	
17	RB	(Bulgaria)	Martin Kostadinov	21	EU	2014	18	1	2018	Youth system	Cherno More Academy	
21	CM	(Bulgaria)	Georgi Iliev (captain)	35	EU	2016	251	55	2017	Free	(China) Shijiazhuang Ever Bright	(Note: G. Iliev made 207 appearances and scored 48 goals during his first two spells at the club between 2000–2003 and 2008–2013.)
22	CB	(Bulgaria)	~~Plamen Nikolov~~	31	EU	2016	41	2	2017	Free	Botev Plovdiv	
25	GK	(Bulgaria)	Ivan Dyulgerov	17	EU	2016	1	0		Youth system	Cherno More Academy	
27	RW	(Bulgaria)	~~Iliyan Nedelchev~~	20	EU	2015	2	0	2018	Youth system	Spartak Varna	(Note: Player left the club in February 2017.)
29	FW	(Slovakia)	Marek Kuzma	28	EU	2016	36	10	2018	Free	(Slovakia) Zlaté Moravce	
30	GK	(Czech Republic)	~~Vojtěch Šrom~~	29	EU	2017	5	0	2019	Free	(Czech Republic) Baník Ostrava	
31	GK	(Czech Republic)	~~Přemysl Kovář~~	31	EU	2016	12	0	2017	Free	(Israel) Hapoel Haifa	
33	GK	(Bulgaria)	Emil Mihaylov	29	EU	2016	16	0	2018	Free	Etar	(Note: E. Mihaylov made 3 appearances during his first spell at the club in 2013.)
34	CM	(Bulgaria)	Emil Yanchev	18	EU	2017	3	0		Youth system	Cherno More Academy	
35	FW	(Bulgaria)	Martin Minchev	16	EU	2017	4	0		Youth system	Cherno More Academy	
36	AM	(Bulgaria)	Rumen Kasabov	17	EU	2017	1	1		Youth system	Cherno More Academy	
37	RB	(Bulgaria)	Ertan Tombak	18	EU	2017	1	0		Youth system	Cherno More Academy	
38	RB	(Bulgaria)	Aleksandar Mihaylov	18	EU	2016	1	0		Youth system	Cherno More Academy	
40	GK	(Serbia)	~~Aleksandar Čanović~~	33	Non-EU	2015	16	0	2017	Free	Free agent	
66	CB	(Bulgaria)	~~Daniel Zlatkov~~	27	EU	2016	4	0	2018	Free	Botev Plovdiv	(Note: Player left the club in September 2016.)
66	RW	(Czech Republic)	Filip Hlúpik	26	EU	2017	4	0	2018	Free	(Czech Republic) Slovácko	
70	AM	(Bulgaria)	Borislav Baldzhiyski	26	EU	2017	16	1	2018	Free	Slavia Sofia	
71	FW	(Bulgaria)	~~Georgi Andonov~~	33	EU	2016	55	4	2017	Free	Beroe	(Note: Andonov made 51 appearances and scored 4 goals during his first spell at the club between 2006 and 2009.)
73	RB	(Czech Republic)	Ondřej Sukup	28	EU	2016	34	0	2019	Free	(Czech Republic) Baník Ostrava	
77	AM	(Spain)	~~Pirulo~~	25	EU	2017	15	1	2018	Free	(Slovakia) Senica	
84	DM	(Bulgaria)	~~Todor Palankov~~	33	EU	2013	120	3	2017	Free	Chernomorets Burgas	(Note: Palankov made 13 appearances during his first spell at the club in 2007.)
97	RW	(Bulgaria)	Nikolay Minkov	19	EU	2016	11	1	2018	Youth system	Cherno More Academy	
98	FW	(Bulgaria)	Valentin Yoskov	18	EU	2015	21	0	2018	Youth system	Cherno More Academy	

- Last updated: 31 May 2017

== Competitions ==
=== Overall ===
==== Competition record ====
Competition	Started round	Current position/round	Final position/round	First match	Last match	Record							
Competition	Started round	Current position/round	Final position/round	First match	Last match	P	W	D	L	GF	GA	GD	Win %
First League	—	—	6th	31 July 2016	31 May 2017	36	13	8	15	39	45	−6	36.11
Bulgarian Cup	First round	—	Quarterfinals	21 September 2016	5 April 2017	3	2	0	1	6	4	+2	66.67
Total						39	15	8	16	45	49	−4	38.46

Updated to match played 31 May 2017
Source: Competitions

==== Summary ====
Clean sheets	10 (10 First League)
Yellow cards	96 (85 First League, 11 Bulgarian Cup)
Red cards	8 (8 First League)
Worst discipline	(Bulgaria) Todor Palankov (11 (yellow card) , 1 (red card) )
Biggest Win	3–1 vs Pirin Blagoevgrad (A) and Neftochimic (H) (A)
Biggest Defeat	0–4 vs Ludogorets Razgrad (A)
Most appearances	(Slovakia) Marek Kuzma (39)
Top scorer	(Slovakia) Marek Kuzma (10)

Correct as of match played on 31 May 2017.

=== Pre-season and friendlies ===
2 July 2016	Nesebar	1 – 1	Cherno More	Nesebar
17:30 EEST	36'	Report	Andonov 73'	Stadium: Nesebar; Attendance: 100

7 July 2016	Levski Sofia	1 – 0	Cherno More	Pravets
19:00 EEST	Añete 90+1'	Report		Referee: Angel Angelov

10 July 2016	Septemvri Sofia	1 – 3	Cherno More	Razlog
10:30 EEST	Adzhov 4'	Report	Andonov 10', 58'; Iliev 25' (pen.)	Stadium: Gradski; Referee: Nikolay Yordanov

13 July 2016	Bansko	0 – 3	Cherno More	Bansko
18:30 EEST		Report	Iliev 24' (pen.); Vasev 69'; Seco 80'	Stadium: Saint Peter; Attendance: 100

16 July 2016	Oborishte	0 – 1	Cherno More	Bansko
10:30 EEST		Report	Nedelchev 18' (pen.)

23 July 2016	Cherno More	2 – 1	Chernomorets Balchik	Varna
18:30 EEST	Seco 3'; Kuzma 10'	Report	Aleksandrov 29'	Stadium: Ticha; Attendance: 500; Referee: Dragomir Draganov

1 September 2016	Cherno More (Bulgaria)	2 – 3	(Qatar) Al-Markhiya	Albena
17:00 EEST	Andonov 16', 58' (pen.)	Report	38'; 48'; 90'	Referee: Yonko Penev

7 October 2016	Cherno More	5 – 0	Nesebar	Varna
16:00 EEST	Minkov 46'; Bacari 58', 84', 86'; Romanov 74'	Report		Stadium: Ticha; Attendance: 200; Referee: Yonko Penev

21 January 2017	Almopos Aridaea (Greece)	0 – 3	(Bulgaria) Cherno More	Thessaloniki, Greece
15:00 EET		Report	Stanchev 36'; Kokonov 88'; Bacari 90'	Stadium: Lolas Multiaction Center

25 January 2017	Kardia (Greece)	0 – 6	(Bulgaria) Cherno More	Thessaloniki, Greece
15:30 EET		Report	Tsvetkov 26'; Kokonov 31'; G. Iliev 42'; Minchev 77'; Kuzma 81'; Stanchev 86'	Stadium: Lolas Multiaction Center

29 January 2017	Agrotikos Asteras II (Greece)	0 – 10	(Bulgaria) Cherno More	Thessaloniki, Greece
15:15 EET		Report	Kokonov 20', 22'; Kuzma 24', 36', 64', 84'; Baldzhiyski 27', 34'; G. Iliev 60'; Yoskov 86'	Stadium: Lolas Multiaction Center

8 February 2017	Nesebar	4 – 1	Cherno More	Nesebar
13:15 EET	Baev 16'; Pyuskyulyu 37'; Karadayi 75'; Stoyanov 83'	Report	Bacari 15'	Stadium: Nesebar

11 February 2017	Cherno More	4 – 1	Chernomorets Balchik	Varna
12:30 EET	Pirulo 14'; Bacari 53'; Baldzhiyski 61'; Hlúpik 66'	Report	Dimitrov 34'	Stadium: Mladost; Attendance: 150

21 February 2017	Cherno More	3 – 0	Kaliakra	Varna
14:30 EET	Kuzma 25'; Kasabov 58'; Minkov 90'	Report		Stadium: Mladost; Attendance: 100; Referee: Dimitar Mihaylov

=== First Professional League ===
==== Regular season ====
===== Matches =====
31 July 2016 1	Pirin Blagoevgrad	1 – 3	Cherno More	Blagoevgrad
21:15 EEST	Zlatinov 26'; Nikolov (yellow card) 45'	Report	G. Iliev 38' (pen.), 69'; Kuzma 61'; Palankov (yellow card) 78'; Malík (yellow card) 90+4'	Stadium: Hristo Botev; Attendance: 2,200; Referee: Stanislav Stavrov; Man of the Match: Georgi Iliev

8 August 2016 2	Cherno More	1 – 0	Montana	Kavarna
20:00 EEST	Nikolov 10'; Palankov (yellow card) 26' (yellow-red card) 62'; Čanović (yellow card) 90+3'	Report	Ivanov (yellow card) 11'; Korudzhiev (yellow card) 48'	Stadium: Kavarna; Attendance: 1,200; Referee: Angel Bayaltsaliev; Man of the Match: Plamen Nikolov

14 August 2016 3	Lokomotiv Gorna Oryahovitsa	2 – 2	Cherno More	Plovdiv
19:00 EEST	Trifonov 38'; Smirnov 65'; Karaneychev (yellow card) 68'	Report	Romanov (yellow card) 29'; Trayanov (yellow card) 61' (yellow-red card) 85'; Bacari 73', 76'; Bacari (yellow card) 74'	Stadium: Lokomotiv; Attendance: 270; Referee: Georgi Kabakov; Man of the Match: Bacari

19 August 2016 4	Cherno More	2 – 0	Lokomotiv Plovdiv	Kavarna
21:15 EEST	Kuzma 28', 58'; Kuzma (yellow card) 79'	Report	Amrioui (yellow card) 31'	Stadium: Kavarna; Attendance: 1,050; Referee: Stanislav Todorov; Man of the Match: Marek Kuzma

27 August 2016 5	Dunav Ruse	3 – 0	Cherno More	Razgrad
17:00 EEST	Ognyanov 9'; Ognyanov (yellow card) 43'; Dimov 45+1'; Budinov 48'; Milchev (yellow card) 50'; Dimov (yellow card) 54'	Report	Zlatkov (yellow card) 9'; Bacari (yellow card) 39'; Trayanov (yellow card) 80'; Andonov (yellow card) 81'	Stadium: Ludogorets Arena; Attendance: 1,750; Referee: Ivaylo Stoyanov; Man of the Match: Miroslav Budinov

9 September 2016 6	Cherno More	1 – 3	Ludogorets Razgrad	Kavarna
21:15 EEST	Palomino 39' (o.g.); Palankov (yellow card) 45+3'; G. Iliev (yellow card) 54'; Malík (yellow card) 77'; Sukup (yellow card) 82'	Report	Wanderson 58'; Marcelinho 75', 84'; Dyakov (yellow card) 77'; Lukoki (yellow card) 85'	Stadium: Kavarna; Attendance: 1,540; Referee: Nikola Popov; Man of the Match: Marcelinho

18 September 2016 7	CSKA Sofia	1 – 0	Cherno More	Sofia
19:00 EEST	Manolev (yellow card) 23'; Culma 90+3'; Simão (yellow card) 90+5'	Report	Tsvetkov (yellow card) 24'; Bacari (yellow card) 83'; Čanović (yellow card) 89'	Stadium: Balgarska Armia; Attendance: 3,000; Referee: Tasko Taskov; Man of the Match: Aleksandar Čanović

25 September 2016 8	Cherno More	0 – 0	Slavia Sofia	Kavarna
21:15 EEST		Report	Vasev (yellow card) 49'; Serderov (yellow card) 90+3'	Stadium: Kavarna; Attendance: 490; Referee: Georgi Kabakov; Man of the Match: Georgi Iliev

30 September 2016 9	Beroe	0 – 1	Cherno More	Stara Zagora
20:00 EEST	Ohene (yellow card) 45+1'; Ivanov (yellow card) 50' (yellow-red card) 51'; Kato (yellow card) 64'	Report	Kokonov 8'; Bacari (yellow card) 50'; Sukup (yellow card) 55'; Kovář (yellow card) 60'; Palankov (yellow card) 85'	Stadium: Beroe; Attendance: 650; Referee: Ivaylo Stoyanov; Man of the Match: Ivan Kokonov

14 October 2016 10	Cherno More	2 – 1	Vereya	Kavarna
17:30 EEST	Venkov (yellow card) 38'; Zafirov 45+2' (o.g.); Kuzma 48'; Georgiev (yellow card) 85'; Kovář (yellow card) 89'	Report	Hassani (yellow card) 9'; Munin 12'; Angelov (yellow card) 27'; Eugénio (yellow card) 38'	Stadium: Kavarna; Attendance: 190; Referee: Petar Dorovski; Man of the Match: Marek Kuzma

22 October 2016 11	Botev Plovdiv	2 – 3	Cherno More	Plovdiv
15:00 EEST	Yusein 62'; João Paulo (yellow card) 63'; Terziev 70'; Terziev (yellow card) 83'	Report	Kokonov 3'; Georgiev 30'; Seco 42'; Sukup (yellow card) 57'; Seco (yellow card) 89'	Stadium: Komatevo; Attendance: 2,100; Referee: Nikola Popov; Man of the Match: Ivan Kokonov

30 October 2016 12	Cherno More	3 – 1	Neftochimic	Kavarna
20:00 EET	G. Iliev 23'; Seco 38'; Nikolov (yellow card) 51'; Nikolov 61'; Sukup (yellow card) 62'; G. Iliev (yellow card) 88'	Report	Malamov (yellow card) 56'; Valchanov 78'; Granchov (yellow card) 69'; Homei (yellow card) 77'; Dyulgerov (yellow card) 82'; Ranđelović (yellow card) 88'	Stadium: Kavarna; Attendance: 600; Referee: Angel Bayaltsaliev; Man of the Match: Georgi Iliev

4 November 2016 13	Levski Sofia	1 – 0	Cherno More	Sofia
17:30 EET	Procházka 22'; Adeniji (yellow card) 52'; Minev (yellow card) 60'; Deza (yellow card) 78'; Procházka (yellow card) 88'	Report	Tsvetkov (yellow card) 40'; Bacari (yellow card) 78'; Stanchev (yellow card) 84'; Sukup (yellow card) 85'	Stadium: Georgi Asparuhov; Attendance: 680; Referee: Stefan Apostolov; Man of the Match: Roman Procházka

18 November 2016 14	Cherno More	0 – 0	Pirin Blagoevgrad	Kavarna
17:30 EET	G. Iliev (yellow card) 59'; Georgiev (yellow card) 86'	Report	Nichev (yellow card) 64'; K. Kostov (yellow card) 85'	Stadium: Kavarna; Attendance: 180; Referee: Stanislav Todorov; Man of the Match: Krasimir Kostov

26 November 2016 15	Montana	0 – 2	Cherno More	Lovech
13:00 EET	Mihov (yellow card) 30'	Report	Bacari 24'; Palankov (yellow card) 61'; Tsvetkov (yellow card) 63'; Palankov 69'	Stadium: Lovech; Attendance: 70; Referee: Nikolay Yordanov; Man of the Match: Bacari

29 November 2016 16	Cherno More	1 – 1	Lokomotiv Gorna Oryahovitsa	Kavarna
15:00 EET	Palankov (yellow card) 17'; Trayanov 54'; Kokonov (yellow card) 57'	Report	Djoman 22'; Djoman (yellow card) 29'; Kavdanski (yellow card) 48'; Mechev (yellow card) 52'; Atanasov (yellow card) 59'; Fidanin (yellow card) 65'; Ndong (yellow card) 81'; Apostolov (red card) 83'	Stadium: Kavarna; Attendance: 70; Referee: Georgi Kabakov; Man of the Match: Igor Djoman

2 December 2016 17	Lokomotiv Plovdiv	1 – 0	Cherno More	Plovdiv
17:30 EET	Bakalov (yellow card) 11'; Vidanov (yellow card) 76'; Kiki 80'; Kiki (yellow card) 81'	Report	Seco (yellow card) 66'	Stadium: Lokomotiv; Attendance: 730; Referee: Nikola Popov; Man of the Match: Dani Kiki

11 December 2016 18	Cherno More	1 – 0	Dunav Ruse	Kavarna
17:30 EET	Tsvetkov 37'; Nikolov (yellow card) 41'; Tsvetkov (yellow card) 50'; G. Iliev (yellow card) 55'	Report	Shopov (yellow card) 75'; Nenov (yellow card) 79'; Radentsov (yellow card) 90+2'	Stadium: Kavarna; Attendance: 220; Referee: Stanislav Stavrov; Man of the Match: Aleksandar Tsvetkov

14 December 2016 19	Ludogorets Razgrad	1 – 1	Cherno More	Razgrad
15:15 EET	Keșerü 49'; Sasha (yellow card) 60'; Natanael (yellow card) 62'	Report	Venkov (yellow card) 38'; Kuzma 51'; Georgiev (yellow card) 61' (yellow-red card) 76'; Palankov (yellow card) 69'; Kovář (yellow card) 90+3'	Stadium: Ludogorets Arena; Attendance: 420; Referee: Nikola Popov; Man of the Match: Marek Kuzma

19 February 2017 20	Cherno More	0 – 2	CSKA Sofia	Kavarna
12:30 EET	G. Iliev (yellow card) 18'; Bacari (yellow card) 78'	Report	Culma (yellow card) 50'; Pedro 85', 90+1'	Stadium: Kavarna; Attendance: 2,550; Referee: Ivaylo Stoyanov; Man of the Match: Rui Pedro

26 February 2017 21	Slavia Sofia	2 – 1	Cherno More	Sofia
12:30 EET	Serderov 3'; Martinov (yellow card) 14'; Minchev 73'; Omar (yellow card) 82'; Semerdzhiev (yellow card) 87'; Stergiakis (yellow card) 90+4'	Report	Bacari 90+4'	Stadium: Vasil Levski; Attendance: 200; Referee: Nikola Popov; Man of the Match: Ivan Minchev

2 March 2017 22	Cherno More	1 – 0	Beroe	Kavarna
15:00 EET	Georgiev (yellow card) 6' (yellow-red card) 49'; Venkov (yellow card) 67'; Baldzhiyski 81'; Šrom (yellow card) 88'	Report	Raynov (yellow card) 16'; Ohene (yellow card) 61'; Ivanov (yellow card) 85'	Stadium: Kavarna; Attendance: 220; Referee: Stefan Apostolov; Man of the Match: Borislav Baldzhiyski

5 March 2017 23	Vereya	0 – 0	Cherno More	Stara Zagora
15:00 EET		Report	Trayanov (yellow card) 30'; Kokonov (yellow card) 60'	Stadium: Trace Arena; Attendance: 260; Referee: Nikolay Yordanov; Man of the Match: Borislav Baldzhiyski

11 March 2017 24	Cherno More	1 – 1	Botev Plovdiv	Kavarna
15:00 EET	Baltanov 10'; Meledje (yellow card) 32'; Marin (yellow card) 52'	Report	Kuzma 12'; Trayanov (yellow card) 53'; Palankov (yellow card) 56'; G. Iliev (yellow card) 73'	Stadium: Kavarna; Attendance: 300; Referee: Angel Bayaltsaliev; Man of the Match: Lachezar Baltanov

19 March 2017 25	Neftochimic	1 – 3	Cherno More	Burgas
15:00 EET	Valchev (yellow card) 43'; Pehlivanov (yellow card) 49'; Valchev 75'; Petkov (yellow card) 78'; Milanov (yellow card) 89'	Report	Dyulgerov (yellow card) 11'; Palankov (yellow card) 60'; Kuzma 69', 72'; Venkov (yellow card) 77'; Pirulo (yellow card) 84'; Sukup (yellow card) 87'; Pirulo 90+1'	Stadium: Lazur; Attendance: 1,880; Referee: Angel Angelov; Man of the Match: Ivan Dyulgerov

1 April 2017 26	Cherno More	1 – 0	Levski Sofia	Kavarna
17:30 EEST	Georgiev (yellow card) 50'; Tsvetkov 64'	Report	Kostadinov (yellow card) 66'; Jablonský (red card) 87'	Stadium: Kavarna; Attendance: 2,510; Referee: Stanislav Todorov; Man of the Match: Bozhidar Kraev

===== League table =====
Pos	Team	Pld	W	D	L	GF	GA	GD	Pts	Qualification
2	Levski Sofia	26	15	6	5	38	17	+21	51	Qualification for the championship round
3	CSKA Sofia	26	13	7	6	35	16	+19	46	Qualification for the championship round
4	Cherno More	26	12	7	7	30	24	+6	43	Qualification for the championship round
5	Lokomotiv Plovdiv	26	10	9	7	35	30	+5	39	Qualification for the championship round
6	Dunav Ruse	26	10	8	8	32	31	+1	38	Qualification for the championship round

Source: Bulgarian Football Union, Soccerway
Rules for classification: 1) Points; 2) Head-to-head points; 3) Head-to-head goal difference; 4) Head-to-head goals scored; 5) Head-to-head away goals scored (only if two teams); 6) Goal difference; 7) Goals scored; 8) Fairplay ranking; 9) Draw.

===== Results summary =====
Overall								Home						Away					
Pld	W	D	L	GF	GA	GD	Pts	W	D	L	GF	GA	GD	W	D	L	GF	GA	GD
26	12	7	7	30	24	+6	43	7	4	2	14	9	+5	5	3	5	16	15	+1

Last updated: 1 April 2017.
Source: bulgarian-football.com

===== League performance =====
Round	1	2	3	4	5	6	7	8	9	10	11	12	13	14	15	16	17	18	19	20	21	22	23	24	25	26
Ground	A	H	A	H	A	H	A	H	A	H	A	H	A	H	A	H	A	H	A	H	A	H	A	H	A	H
Result	W	W	D	W	L	L	L	D	W	W	W	W	L	D	W	D	L	W	D	L	L	W	D	D	W	W
Position	1	1	1	1	4	7	7	8	6	6	4	3	3	4	3	4	6	4	4	5	5	4	5	5	4	4

Source: bulgarian-football.com
A = Away; H = Home; W = Win; D = Draw; L = Loss

==== Championship round ====
===== Matches =====
8 April 2017 27	CSKA Sofia	3 – 1	Cherno More	Sofia
20:00 EEST	Arsénio (yellow card) 25'; Karanga 45', 87'; Despodov 45+1'; Rui Pedro (yellow card) 60'; Chrobadzhiyski (yellow card) 63' (yellow-red card) 75'; Dyulgerov (yellow card) 90'	Report	Stanchev (yellow card) 39'; E. Mihaylov (yellow card) 43'; Trayanov (red card) 60'; Kokonov 77'; Tsvetkov (yellow card) 79'; Nikolov (yellow card) 85'	Stadium: Balgarska Armia; Attendance: 1,050; Referee: Nikola Popov; Man of the Match: Kiril Despodov

15 April 2017 28	Dunav Ruse	1 – 0	Cherno More	Razgrad
16:30 EEST	Budinov 43'; Marem (red card) 68'; Mujeci (yellow card) 83'	Report	Stanchev (yellow card) 69'	Stadium: Ludogorets Arena; Attendance: 430; Referee: Georgi Kabakov; Man of the Match: Miroslav Budinov

23 April 2017 29	Cherno More	3 – 2	Lokomotiv Plovdiv	Kavarna
17:45 EEST	Stanchev 32'; Palankov (yellow card) 35'; G. Iliev (yellow card) 53'; Vezalov 66' (o.g.); Tsvetkov (yellow card) 73'; Kuzma 89'	Report	Velkovski (yellow card) 36'; Vezalov (yellow card) 42'; Kamburov 45'; Bakalov 86'	Stadium: Kavarna; Attendance: 200; Referee: Angel Angelov; Man of the Match: Martin Kamburov

1 May 2017 30	Ludogorets Razgrad	4 – 0	Cherno More	Razgrad
20:00 EEST	Keșerü 7', 45' (pen.); Palomino 37'; Wanderson 39'; Natanael (yellow card) 43'; Keșerü (yellow card) 61'	Report	Purulo (yellow card) 16'; Kostadinov (yellow card) 53'; Sukup (yellow card) 73'	Stadium: Ludogorets Arena; Attendance: 890; Referee: Volen Chinkov; Man of the Match: Claudiu Keșerü

7 May 2017 31	Cherno More	0 – 1	Levski Sofia	Kavarna
17:30 EEST	Tsvetkov (yellow card) 35'; Sukup (yellow card) 59' (yellow-red card) 70'; Venkov (yellow card) 90'	Report	Soukouna 39'; Jablonský (yellow card) 42'; Narh (yellow card) 68'; Kraev (yellow card) 76'	Stadium: Kavarna; Attendance: 1,100; Referee: Angel Angelov; Man of the Match: Mehdi Bourabia

13 May 2017 32	Cherno More	0 – 1	CSKA Sofia	Kavarna
17:30 EEST	Stanchev (yellow card) 64' (yellow-red card) 78'; Kuzma (yellow card) 66'; Georgiev (yellow card) 76'; Palankov (yellow card) 80'	Report	Manolev (yellow card) 54'; Chorbadzhiyski (yellow card) 65'; Karanga 81'; Nedyalkov (yellow card) 90+1'	Stadium: Kavarna; Attendance: 1,700; Referee: Nikola Popov; Man of the Match: Fernando Karanga

17 May 2017 33	Cherno More	1 – 2	Dunav Ruse	Kavarna
17:30 EEST	Palankov (yellow card) 36'; Venkov 55'	Report	Budinov 17'; Hubchev (yellow card) 41'; Kostadinov 60'; Larin (yellow card) 67'	Stadium: Kavarna; Attendance: 240; Referee: Stanislav Todorov; Man of the Match: Vasil Shopov

21 May 2017 34	Lokomotiv Plovdiv	2 – 1	Cherno More	Plovdiv
20:00 EEST	Kamburov 18'; Martinović 69'; Martinović (yellow card) 70'	Report	Minkov 1'; Georgiev (yellow card) 21'; Minkov (yellow card) 64'; Kokonov (yellow card) 90+2'	Stadium: Lokomotiv; Attendance: 650; Referee: Angel Bayaltsaliev; Man of the Match: Nikolay Minkov

28 May 2017 35	Cherno More	1 – 3	Ludogorets Razgrad	Kavarna
21:00 EEST	Kuzma 4'; Minchev (yellow card) 32'; Stanchev (yellow card) 83'	Report	Plastun 16'; Grigorov 32'; K. Dimitrov 45+2'	Stadium: Kavarna; Attendance: 290; Referee: Petar Dorovski; Man of the Match: Martin Kostadinov

31 May 2017 36	Levski Sofia	2 – 2	Cherno More	Sofia
20:00 EEST	Kraev 74'; Pirgov (yellow card) 79'; Procházka 81'	Report	Tsvetkov (yellow card) 10' (yellow-red card) 89'; Yoskov (yellow card) 17'; Kostadinov 40'; Kasabov 77'; Sukup (yellow card) 82'	Stadium: Vivacom Arena - Georgi Asparuhov; Attendance: 650; Referee: Nikolay Yordanov; Man of the Match: Martin Kostadinov

===== League table =====
Pos	Team	Pld	W	D	L	GF	GA	GD	Pts	Qualification
1	Ludogorets Razgrad (C)	36	25	8	3	87	28	+59	83	Qualification for the Champions League second qualifying round
2	CSKA Sofia (Note: On 29 May 2017 a UEFA letter to the Bulgarian Football Union declared that CSKA Sofia were not allowed to compete in European tournaments for the following two seasons as they were considered to have been re-formed as a new club and thus did not pass the "three-year rule". As this decision was appealed by CSKA Sofia, the Bulgarian Football Union granted a license to them subject to legal proceedings. A few hours prior to the Europa League first qualifying round draw, UEFA replaced them by Dunav Ruse, the fourth-placed team of the league.)	36	19	10	7	51	21	+30	67	
3	Levski Sofia (O)	36	18	9	9	50	31	+19	63	Qualification for the European play-off final
4	Dunav Ruse	36	15	10	11	46	44	+2	55	Qualification for the Europa League first qualifying round
5	Lokomotiv Plovdiv	36	14	10	12	50	52	−2	52	
6	Cherno More Varna	36	13	8	15	39	45	−6	47	

Source: Soccerway
Rules for classification: 1) Points; 2) Head-to-head points; 3) Head-to-head goal difference; 4) Head-to-head goals scored; 5) Head-to-head away goals scored (only if two teams); 6) Goal difference; 7) Goals scored; 8) Fairplay ranking; 9) Draw.
(C) Champions; (O) Play-off winners

===== Results summary =====
Overall								Home						Away					
Pld	W	D	L	GF	GA	GD	Pts	W	D	L	GF	GA	GD	W	D	L	GF	GA	GD
10	1	1	8	9	21	−12	4	1	0	4	5	9	−4	0	1	4	4	12	−8

Last updated: 31 May 2017.
Source: bulgarian-football.com

===== League performance =====
Round	1	2	3	4	5	6	7	8	9	10
Ground	A	A	H	A	H	H	H	A	H	A
Result	L	L	W	L	L	L	L	L	L	D
Position	4	5	4	4	4	5	5	6	6	6

Source: bulgarian-football.com
A = Away; H = Home; W = Win; D = Draw; L = Loss

=== Bulgarian Cup ===
21 September 2016 1st round	Rozova Dolina	1 – 2	Cherno More	Kazanlak
16:00 EEST	G. Georgiev (yellow card) 18'; Rachev 86' (pen.); Petrov (yellow card) 87'	Report	Kokonov 20'; Malík (yellow card) 45+1'; Stanchev (yellow card) 54'; Yoskov 80'; A. Mihaylov (yellow card) 85'	Stadium: Sevtopolis; Attendance: 1,500; Referee: Valentin Zhelezov

26 October 2016 2nd round	Levski Sofia	2 – 3 (a.e.t.)	Cherno More	Sofia
19:00 EEST	Adeniji 63'; Pirgov (yellow card) 56'; Pirgov 79'; Kostadinov (yellow card) 80'; Deza (yellow card) 97'; Bourabia (yellow card) 104'	Report	Tsvetkov 3', 101'; Bacari 31'; G. Iliev (yellow card) 51'; Nikolov (yellow card) 87'; Tsvektov (yellow card) 108'; Seco (yellow card) 110'; Georgiev (yellow card) 120+1'	Stadium: Georgi Asparuhov; Attendance: 1,190; Referee: Volen Chinkov

5 April 2017 3rd round	Litex	1 – 1 (a.e.t.) (5 – 3 p)	Cherno More	Lovech
17:30 EEST	Kostov 22' (pen.); Vasev (yellow card) 53'; Baychev (yellow card) 74'; R. Ivanov (yellow card) 89'; Kakalov (yellow card) 96'; D. Dimitrov (yellow card) 98'	Report	Venkov 34'; Baldzhiyski (yellow card) 66'; Kuzma (yellow card) 93'; Georgiev (yellow card) 111'	Stadium: Lovech; Attendance: 1,750; Referee: Volen Chinkov
	Penalties
	Kostov (penalty scored); Balakov (penalty scored); Genkov (penalty scored); R. Ivanov (penalty scored); Baychev (penalty scored)		(penalty scored) G. Iliev; (penalty scored) Tsvetkov; (penalty missed) Venkov; (penalty scored) Kokonov

== Statistics ==
=== Player appearances ===
Key:
‡ On loan from another club * First appearance(s) for the club

- # = Squad number
- **Pos** = Playing position
- **P** = Number of games played
- **G** = Number of goals scored
- **GK** = Goalkeeper
- **DF** = Defender
- **MF** = Midfielder
- **FW** = Forward
- = Yellow cards
- = Red cards
- † Permanent player left club during the season
- ¤ Loaned to another club for part or all of season

Correct as of 31 May 2017. Starting appearances are listed first, followed by substitute appearances in parentheses where applicable.

No.	Pos	Name	P	G	P	G	P	G	A yellow card	A red card	Notes
No.	Pos	Name	League		Bulgarian Cup		Total		Discipline		Notes
3	MF	(Bulgaria) Daniel Georgiev †	15(6)	1	2(1)	0	17(7)	1	7	2	
4	DF	(Bulgaria) Mihail Venkov †	28	1	2	1	30	2	5	0	
5	DF	(Bulgaria) Stefan Stanchev	24(1)	1	3	0	27(1)	1	5	1	
6	MF	(Bulgaria) Aleksandar Tsvetkov	31	2	2(1)	2	33(1)	4	8	1	
7	MF	(Portugal) Hugo Seco †	18	2	1	0	19	2	3	0	
8	MF	(Czech Republic) Jan Malík †	2(8)	0	1	0	3(8)	0	3	0	
9	FW	(The Gambia) Bacari †	14(4)	4	1	1	15(4)	5	6	0	
10	MF	(Bulgaria) Ilian Iliev	0(3)	0	1	0	1(3)	0	0	0	
11	MF	(Bulgaria) Vladislav Romanov †	3(3)	0	1	0	4(3)	0	1	0	
13	MF	(Bulgaria) Ivan Kokonov	25(7)	3	2(1)	1	27(8)	4	3	0	
15	DF	(Bulgaria) Trayan Trayanov †	12(8)	1	0(1)	0	12(9)	1	3	2	
17	DF	(Bulgaria) Martin Kostadinov	11(3)	1	1	0	12(3)	1	1	0	
21	MF	(Bulgaria) Georgi Iliev (c)	27(3)	3	2	0	29(3)	3	8	0	
22	DF	(Bulgaria) Plamen Nikolov †	25(2)	2	3	0	28(2)	2	4	0	
25	GK	(Bulgaria) Ivan Dyulgerov	1	0	0	0	1	0	1	0	
27	MF	(Bulgaria) Iliyan Nedelchev †	0	0	0	0	0	0	0	0	
29	FW	(Slovakia) Marek Kuzma	**26(10)**	**10**	1(2)	0	**27(12)**	**10**	3	0	
30	GK	(Czech Republic) Vojtěch Šrom †	5	0	0	0	5	0	1	0	
31	GK	(Czech Republic) Přemysl Kovář †	12	0	2	0	14	0	3	0	
33	GK	(Bulgaria) Emil Mihaylov	13	0	1	0	14	0	1	0	
34	MF	(Bulgaria) Emil Yanchev	2(1)	0	0	0	2(1)	0	0	0	
35	FW	(Bulgaria) Martin Minchev	2(2)	0	0	0	2(2)	0	1	0	
36	MF	(Bulgaria) Rumen Kasabov	0(1)	1	0	0	0(1)	1	0	0	
37	DF	(Bulgaria) Ertan Tombak	1	0	0	0	1	0	0	0	
38	DF	(Bulgaria) Aleksandar Mihaylov	0(1)	0	0(1)	0	0(2)	0	1	0	
40	GK	(Serbia) Aleksandar Čanović †	5	0	0	0	5	0	2	0	
66	DF	(Bulgaria) Daniel Zlatkov †	3(1)	0	0	0	3(1)	0	1	0	
66	MF	(Czech Republic) Filip Hlúpik	2(2)	0	0	0	2(2)	0	0	0	
70	MF	(Bulgaria) Borislav Baldzhiyski	11(5)	1	1	0	12(5)	1	1	0	
71	FW	(Bulgaria) Georgi Andonov †	0(4)	0	0	0	0(4)	0	1	0	
73	DF	(Czech Republic) Ondřej Sukup	34	0	2	0	36	0	8	1	
77	MF	(Spain) Pirulo †	8(7)	1	1	0	9(7)	1	2	0	
84	MF	(Bulgaria) Todor Palankov †	28(1)	1	1	0	29(1)	1	**11**	1	
97	MF	(Bulgaria) Nikolay Minkov	4(6)	1	1(1)	0	5(7)	1	1	0	
98	FW	(Bulgaria) Valentin Yoskov	4(12)	0	1	1	5(12)	1	1	0	

=== Minutes on the pitch ===
Includes injury time. Positions indicate the most natural position of the particular player, followed by alternative positions where he actually started games during the course of the season.

No.	Position	Alternative Position(s)	Player	First Professional League	Bulgarian Cup	Total
3	CM	DM / RB	(Bulgaria) Daniel Georgiev	1390	248	1638
4	LB		(Bulgaria) Mihail Venkov	2647	247	2894
5	RB	CB / LB	(Bulgaria) Stefan Stanchev	2286	**341**	2627
6	CM	DM / AM / CB / FW / RW	(Bulgaria) Aleksandar Tsvetkov	2922	270	3192
7	RW		(Portugal) Hugo Seco	1583	113	1696
8	DM	CM / AM	(Czech Republic) Jan Malík	281	71	352
9	FW	LW	(The Gambia) Bacari	1207	45	1252
10	AM		(Bulgaria) Ilian Iliev	60	58	118
11	LW	LB	(Bulgaria) Vladislav Romanov	263	94	357
13	LW	RW	(Bulgaria) Ivan Kokonov	2412	251	2663
15	CB		(Bulgaria) Trayan Trayanov	1121	11	1132
17	RB	LB / RW	(Bulgaria) Martin Kostadinov	965	94	1059
21	CM	AM	(Bulgaria) Georgi Iliev	2578	247	2825
22	CB		(Bulgaria) Plamen Nikolov	2317	332	2649
25	GK		(Bulgaria) Ivan Dyulgerov	95	0	95
27	RW		(Bulgaria) Iliyan Nedelchev	0	0	0
29	FW	AM	(Slovakia) Marek Kuzma	2570	238	2808
30	GK		(Czech Republic) Vojtěch Šrom	472	0	472
31	GK		(Czech Republic) Přemysl Kovář	1132	218	1350
33	GK		(Bulgaria) Emil Mihaylov	1225	123	1348
34	CM	CB	(Bulgaria) Emil Yanchev	225	0	225
35	FW	RW / LW	(Bulgaria) Martin Minchev	204	0	204
36	AM		(Bulgaria) Rumen Kasabov	34	0	34
37	RB		(Bulgaria) Ertan Tombak	94	0	94
38	RB		(Bulgaria) Aleksandar Mihaylov	1	9	10
40	GK		(Serbia) Aleksandar Čanović	478	0	478
66	CB		(Bulgaria) Daniel Zlatkov	246	0	246
66	RW		(Czech Republic) Filip Hlúpik	241	0	241
70	AM	LW	(Bulgaria) Borislav Baldzhiyski	976	67	1043
71	FW		(Bulgaria) Georgi Andonov	89	0	89
73	RB	CB	(Czech Republic) Ondřej Sukup	**3173**	247	**3420**
77	AM	RW / LW	(Spain) Pirulo	687	59	746
84	DM	CM / CB	(Bulgaria) Todor Palankov	2369	124	2493
97	RW	LW	(Bulgaria) Nikolay Minkov	383	150	533
98	FW	AM	(Bulgaria) Valentin Yoskov	422	94	516

Correct as of match played on 31 May 2017.

=== Goalscorers ===
Rank	Pos.	Player	L	C	Total
1	FW	(Slovakia) Marek Kuzma	10	0	10
2	FW	(The Gambia) Bacari	4	1	5
3	MF	(Bulgaria) Ivan Kokonov	3	1	4
3	MF	(Bulgaria) Aleksandar Tsvetkov	2	2	4
4	MF	(Bulgaria) Georgi Iliev	3	0	3
5	MF	(Portugal) Hugo Seco	2	0	2
5	DF	(Bulgaria) Plamen Nikolov	2	0	2
5	DF	(Bulgaria) Mihail Venkov	1	1	2
6	MF	(Bulgaria) Daniel Georgiev	1	0	1
6	MF	(Bulgaria) Todor Palankov	1	0	1
6	DF	(Bulgaria) Trayan Trayanov	1	0	1
6	MF	(Bulgaria) Borislav Baldzhiyski	1	0	1
6	MF	(Spain) Pirulo	1	0	1
6	DF	(Bulgaria) Stefan Stanchev	1	0	1
6	MF	(Bulgaria) Nikolay Minkov	1	0	1
6	DF	(Bulgaria) Martin Kostadinov	1	0	1
6	MF	(Bulgaria) Rumen Kasabov	1	0	1
6	FW	(Bulgaria) Valentin Yoskov	0	1	1
Own goals			3	0	3
**Totals**			**39**	**6**	46

Last updated: 31 May 2017

=== Clean sheets ===
R	No.	Nat	Goalkeeper	L	C	**Total**
1	31	(Czech Republic)	Přemysl Kovář	5	0	**5**
2	30	(Czech Republic)	Vojtěch Šrom	2	–	**2**
2	33	(Bulgaria)	Emil Mihaylov	2	0	**2**
3	40	(Serbia)	Aleksandar Čanović	1	–	**1**
			**Totals**	**10**	**0**	**10**

Last updated: 5 April 2017

=== Own goals ===
Own goals in favour
Date	Pos.	Player	Opponent	Competition
9 Sept	DF	(Argentina) José Palomino	Ludogorets Razgrad	First League
14 Oct	DF	(Bulgaria) Vladimir Zafirov	Vereya	First League
23 Apr	DF	(Bulgaria) Dimitar Vezalov	Lokomotiv Plovdiv	First League

Own goals conceded
Date	Pos.	Player	Opponent	Competition

=== Man of the Match performances ===
Ranking	Squad Number	Position	Player	Round	Opponent	Total
1	21	MF	(Bulgaria) Georgi Iliev	1	Pirin Blagoevgrad (A)	3
1	21	MF	(Bulgaria) Georgi Iliev	8	Slavia (H)	3
1	21	MF	(Bulgaria) Georgi Iliev	12	Neftochimic (H)	3
1	29	FW	(Slovakia) Marek Kuzma	4	Lokomotiv Plovdiv (H)	3
1	29	FW	(Slovakia) Marek Kuzma	10	Vereya (H)	3
1	29	FW	(Slovakia) Marek Kuzma	19	Ludogorets Razgrad (A)	3
2	13	MF	(Bulgaria) Ivan Kokonov	9	Beroe (A)	2
2	13	MF	(Bulgaria) Ivan Kokonov	11	Botev Plovdiv (A)	2
2	9	FW	(The Gambia) Bacari	3	Lokomotiv Gorna Oryahovitsa (A)	2
2	9	FW	(The Gambia) Bacari	15	Montana (A)	2
2	70	MF	(Bulgaria) Borislav Baldzhiyski	22	Beroe (H)	2
2	70	MF	(Bulgaria) Borislav Baldzhiyski	23	Vereya (A)	2
2	17	DF	(Bulgaria) Martin Kostadinov	35	Ludogorets Razgrad (H)	2
2	17	DF	(Bulgaria) Martin Kostadinov	36	Levski Sofia (A)	2
3	22	DF	(Bulgaria) Plamen Nikolov	2	Montana (H)	1
3	40	GK	(Serbia) Aleksandar Čanović	7	CSKA Sofia (A)	1
3	6	MF	(Bulgaria) Aleksandar Tsvetkov	18	Dunav Ruse (H)	1
3	25	GK	(Bulgaria) Ivan Dyulgerov	25	Neftochimic (A)	1
3	97	MF	(Bulgaria) Nikolay Minkov	34	Lokomotiv Plovdiv (A)	1

Last updated: 31 May 2017
Source: Match reports in Competitions, Gong.bg Man of the Match Awards

=== Disciplinary record ===
Correct as of 31 May 2017
Players are listed in descending order of (yellow card)
Players with the same amount of cards are listed by their position on the club's official website

**R.**	**No.**	**Nat**	**Pos**	**Name**	**First Professional League**			**Bulgarian Cup**			**Total**		
**R.**	**No.**	**Nat**	**Pos**	**Name**	Booked	(yellow card) (yellow-red card)	Sent off (straight red)	Booked	(yellow card) (yellow-red card)	Sent off (straight red)	Booked	(yellow card) (yellow-red card)	Sent off (straight red)
1	84	(Bulgaria)	MF	Todor Palankov	11	1	0	0	0	0	11	1	0
2	3	(Bulgaria)	MF	Daniel Georgiev	5	2	0	2	0	0	7	2	0
3	6	(Bulgaria)	MF	Aleksandar Tsvetkov	7	1	0	1	0	0	8	1	0
3	73	(Czech Republic)	DF	Ondřej Sukup	8	1	0	0	0	0	8	1	0
4	21	(Bulgaria)	MF	Georgi Iliev	7	0	0	1	0	0	8	0	0
5	5	(Bulgaria)	DF	Stefan Stanchev	4	1	0	1	0	0	5	1	0
5	15	(Bulgaria)	DF	Trayan Trayanov	3	1	1	0	0	0	3	1	1
6	9	(The Gambia)	FW	Bacari	6	0	0	0	0	0	6	0	0
7	4	(Bulgaria)	DF	Mihail Venkov	5	0	0	0	0	0	5	0	0
8	22	(Bulgaria)	DF	Plamen Nikolov	3	0	0	1	0	0	4	0	0
9	7	(Portugal)	MF	Hugo Seco	2	0	0	1	0	0	3	0	0
9	8	(Czech Republic)	MF	Jan Malík	2	0	0	1	0	0	3	0	0
9	13	(Bulgaria)	MF	Ivan Kokonov	3	0	0	0	0	0	3	0	0
9	29	(Slovakia)	FW	Marek Kuzma	2	0	0	1	0	0	3	0	0
9	31	(Czech Republic)	GK	Přemysl Kovář	3	0	0	0	0	0	3	0	0
10	40	(Serbia)	GK	Aleksandar Čanović	2	0	0	0	0	0	2	0	0
10	77	(Spain)	MF	Pirulo	2	0	0	0	0	0	2	0	0
11	11	(Bulgaria)	MF	Vladislav Romanov	1	0	0	0	0	0	1	0	0
11	17	(Bulgaria)	DF	Martin Kostadinov	1	0	0	0	0	0	1	0	0
11	25	(Bulgaria)	GK	Ivan Dyulgerov	1	0	0	0	0	0	1	0	0
11	30	(Czech Republic)	GK	Vojtěch Šrom	1	0	0	0	0	0	1	0	0
11	33	(Bulgaria)	GK	Emil Mihaylov	1	0	0	0	0	0	1	0	0
11	34	(Bulgaria)	DF	Aleksandar Mihaylov	0	0	0	1	0	0	1	0	0
11	35	(Bulgaria)	FW	Martin Minchev	1	0	0	0	0	0	1	0	0
11	66	(Bulgaria)	DF	Daniel Zlatkov	1	0	0	0	0	0	1	0	0
11	70	(Bulgaria)	MF	Borislav Baldzhiyski	0	0	0	1	0	0	1	0	0
11	71	(Bulgaria)	FW	Georgi Andonov	1	0	0	0	0	0	1	0	0
11	97	(Bulgaria)	MF	Nikolay Minkov	1	0	0	0	0	0	1	0	0
11	98	(Bulgaria)	FW	Valentin Yoskov	1	0	0	0	0	0	1	0	0
				**TOTALS**	**85**	**7**	**1**	**11**	**0**	**0**	**96**	**7**	**1**

==== Suspensions served ====
Date	Matches Missed	Player	Reason	Opponents Missed
8 August 2016	1	(Bulgaria) Todor Palankov	(red card) vs Montana	Lokomotiv Gorna Oryahovitsa (A)
14 August 2016	1	(Bulgaria) Trayan Trayanov	(red card) vs Lokomotiv Gorna Oryahovitsa	Lokomotiv Plovdiv (H)
4 November 2016	1	(The Gambia) Bacari	5th (yellow card) vs Levski Sofia	Pirin Blagoevgrad (H)
4 November 2016	1	(Czech Republic) Ondřej Sukup	5th (yellow card) vs Levski Sofia	Pirin Blagoevgrad (H)
29 November 2016	1	(Bulgaria) Todor Palankov	5th (yellow card) vs Lokomotiv Gorna Oryahovitsa	Lokomotiv Plovdiv (A)
11 December 2016	1	(Bulgaria) Aleksandar Tsvetkov	5th (yellow card) vs Dunav Ruse	Ludogorets Razgrad (A)
11 December 2016	1	(Bulgaria) Georgi Iliev	5th (yellow card) vs Dunav Ruse	Ludogorets Razgrad (A)
14 December 2016	1	(Bulgaria) Daniel Georgiev	(red card) vs Ludogorets Razgrad	CSKA Sofia (H)
2 March 2017	1	(Bulgaria) Daniel Georgiev	(red card) vs Beroe	Vereya (A)
5 April 2017	1	(Bulgaria) Daniel Georgiev	5th (yellow card) vs Litex	CSKA Sofia (A)
8 April 2017	1	(Bulgaria) Trayan Trayanov	(red card) vs CSKA Sofia	Dunav Ruse (A)
23 April 2017	2	(Bulgaria) Todor Palankov	9th (yellow card) vs Lokomotiv Plovdiv	Ludogorets Razgrad (A), Levski Sofia (H)
7 May 2017	1	(Czech Republic) Ondřej Sukup	(red card) vs Levski Sofia	CSKA Sofia (H)
7 May 2017	1	(Bulgaria) Mihail Venkov	5th (yellow card) vs Levski Sofia	CSKA Sofia (H)
13 May 2017	1	(Bulgaria) Stefan Stanchev	(red card) vs CSKA Sofia	Dunav Ruse (H)
28 May 2017	1	(Bulgaria) Stefan Stanchev	5th (yellow card) vs Ludogorets Razgrad	Levski Sofia (A)
31 May 2017	1	(Bulgaria) Aleksandar Tsvetkov	(red card) vs Levski Sofia	first match of next season

=== Injuries ===
Players in bold are still out from their injuries.
Players listed will/have miss(ed) at least one competitive game (missing from whole match day squad).

Date	No.	Pos.	Name	Injury	Note	Recovery time	Games missed	Source
12 February 2016	5	DF	(Bulgaria) Stefan Stanchev	Ruptured ACL	Occurred during last winter pre-season.	6 months	5	
12 July 2016	9	FW	(The Gambia) Bacari	Pulled hamstring	Occurred during pre-season.	3 weeks	1	
10 November 2016	40	GK	(Serbia) Aleksandar Čanović	Knee injury	Occurred during training.	1 month	6	
2 December 2016	9	FW	(The Gambia) Bacari	Knee injury	Occurred during match against Lokomotiv Plovdiv.	2 weeks	2	
11 December 2016	7	MF	(Portugal) Hugo Seco	Ankle injury	Occurred during match against Dunav Ruse.	1 week	1	
January 2017	4	DF	(Bulgaria) Mihail Venkov	Achilles tendon injury	Occurred during pre-season.	Exact time unknown	2	
10 February 2017	22	DF	(Bulgaria) Plamen Nikolov	Appendicitis	Appendectomy took place on 10 February.	1 month	3	
19 February 2017	21	MF	(Bulgaria) Georgi Iliev	Ankle injury	Occurred during match against CSKA Sofia.	Exact time unknown	3	
26 February 2017	5	DF	(Bulgaria) Stefan Stanchev	Pulled hamstring	Occurred during match against Slavia Sofia.	2 weeks	3	
1 March 2017	33	GK	(Bulgaria) Emil Mihaylov	Unspecified injury	Occurred during training.	Exact time unknown	3	
5 March 2017	9	FW	(The Gambia) Bacari	Ruptured ACL	Occurred during match against Vereya.	6 months	13	
17 May 2017	6	MF	(Bulgaria) Aleksandar Tsvetkov	Knee injury	Occurred during match against Dunav Ruse.	Exact time unknown	2	

As of

=== Home attendances ===
Correct as of match played on 28 May 2017.
Win Draw Loss Void

Comp	Date	Score	Opponent	Attendance
First Professional League	8 August 2016	1–0	Montana	1,200
First Professional League	19 August 2016	2–0	Lokomotiv Plovdiv	1,050
First Professional League	9 September 2016	1–3	Ludogorets Razgrad	1,540
First Professional League	25 September 2016	0–0	Slavia Sofia	490
First Professional League	14 October 2016	2–1	Vereya	190
First Professional League	30 October 2016	3–1	Neftochimic	600
First Professional League	18 November 2016	0–0	Pirin Blagoevgrad	180
First Professional League	29 November 2016	1–1	Lokomotiv Gorna Oryahovitsa	70
First Professional League	11 December 2016	1–0	Dunav Ruse	220
First Professional League	19 February 2017	0–2	CSKA Sofia	2,550
First Professional League	2 March 2017	1–0	Beroe	220
First Professional League	11 March 2017	1–1	Botev Plovdiv	300
First Professional League	1 April 2017	1–0	Levski Sofia	2,510
First Professional League	23 April 2017	3–2	Lokomotiv Plovdiv	200
First Professional League	7 May 2017	0–1	Levski Sofia	1,100
First Professional League	13 May 2017	0–1	CSKA Sofia	1,700
First Professional League	17 May 2017	1–2	Dunav Ruse	240
First Professional League	28 May 2017	1–3	Ludogorets Razgrad	290
			**Total attendance**	**14,650**
			**Total league attendance**	**14,650**
			**Average attendance**	**814**
			**Average league attendance**	**814**

Source: Match reports in Competitions

== Club ==
=== Coaching staff ===
Position	Staff
Manager	(Bulgaria) Georgi Ivanov
Assistant First Team Coach	(Bulgaria) Ivaylo Petrov
Assistant First Team Coach	(Bulgaria) Emanuil Lukanov
Goalkeeper Coach	(Bulgaria) Stoyan Stavrev
First Team Fitness Coach	(Bulgaria) Veselin Markov
Individual Team Fitness Coach	(Bulgaria) Viktor Bumbalov
Medical Director	(Bulgaria) Dr. Petko Atev

Last updated: 1 July 2016
Source: Cherno More

=== Other information ===
Owner/Chairman	(Bulgaria) Marin Mitev
Chief Executive	(Bulgaria) Marin Marinov
Sporting Director	(Bulgaria) Todor Velikov
Ground (capacity and dimensions)	Ticha Stadium (12,500 / 103x67 metres)

Updated to match played 1 August 2012
Source: Cherno More
