= List of Bulgarian football transfers winter 2016–17 =

This is a list of Bulgarian football transfers for the 2016–17 winter transfer window. Only transfers involving a team from the two professional leagues, First League and Second League are listed.

== First League ==
=== Beroe Stara Zagora ===
In:

No.	Pos.	Nation	Player
5	DF	BUL	Asen Georgiev (from (Croatia) Istra)
7	MF	BUL	Martin Raynov (from Lokomotiv Plovdiv)
11	FW	FIN	Ville Salmikivi (from (Finland) HIFK)
12	GK	SVK	Dušan Perniš (from (Greece) Iraklis)
17	MF	BUL	Anton Karachanakov (on loan from (Poland) Cracovia)
19	DF	BUL	Plamen Tenev (loan return from Nesebar)
24	FW	CRO	Mateas Delić (Free agent)

Out:

No.	Pos.	Nation	Player
7	FW	BUL	Aleksandar Kolev (to (Poland) Stal Mielec)
8	MF	BUL	Vasil Panayotov (to (Poland) Stal Mielec)
10	MF	BUL	Stanislav Dryanov (to Pomorie)
11	MF	SRB	Nemanja Milisavljević (released)
13	DF	BUL	Emin Ahmed (on loan to Nesebar)
17	MF	POR	Pedrito (to (Portugal) Gil Vicente)
19	MF	BUL	Aleksandar Vasilev (loan return to Ludogorets Razgrad)
22	GK	BUL	Blagoy Makendzhiev (to Pirin Blagoevgrad)
24	DF	BUL	Hristofor Hubchev (to Dunav Ruse)
27	MF	ESP	Marquitos (to (Poland) Miedź Legnica)
32	MF	BUL	Emil Gargorov (end of contract)
71	DF	BUL	Iliya Milanov (to Neftochimic Burgas)
77	FW	CTA	David Manga (to (Israel) Hapoel Ashkelon)

=== Botev Plovdiv ===
In:

No.	Pos.	Nation	Player
4	DF	BUL	Viktor Genev (from Levski Sofia)
9	FW	BRA	Fernando Viana (from (Brazil) Joinville)
13	FW	BUL	Ismet Ramadan (loan return from Levski Karlovo)
19	FW	BUL	Boris Tyutyukov (loan return from Vitosha Bistritsa)
24	DF	BUL	Lazar Marin (from CSKA Sofia)
26	MF	BUL	Radoslav Apostolov (loan return from Levski Karlovo)
39	MF	BUL	Antonio Vutov (on loan from (Italy) Udinese)
70	DF	BUL	Plamen Dimov (from (Kazakhstan) Altay Semey)
99	GK	BUL	Ivan Čvorović (from Levski Sofia)
—	MF	BUL	Emil Kamberov (loan return from Oborishte)

Out:

No.	Pos.	Nation	Player
4	DF	BRA	Rafael (released)
6	DF	BUL	Daniel Zlatkov (to (Belarus) Shakhtyor Soligorsk)
16	MF	CPV	Sténio (to (Romania) Politehnica Iași)
37	FW	BRA	João Paulo (to Ludogorets Razgrad)
45	FW	BUL	Nasko Milev (to Slavia Sofia)
71	DF	BUL	Milen Kikarin (released)
73	FW	BUL	Ivan Stoyanov (to Etar)
88	FW	BUL	Daniel Kutev (to (Greece) Nestos Chrysoupoli)
99	GK	BUL	Pavel Petkov (to (Germany) Hohenstein-Ernstthal)
—	MF	BUL	Rangel Ignatov (to Maritsa, previously on loan at Nesebar)

=== Cherno More ===
In:

No.	Pos.	Nation	Player
30	GK	CZE	Vojtěch Šrom (from (Czech Republic) Baník Ostrava)
66	MF	CZE	Filip Hlúpik (from (Czech Republic) Slovácko)
70	MF	BUL	Borislav Baldzhiyski (from Slavia Sofia)
77	MF	ESP	Pirulo (from (Slovakia) Senica)

Out:

No.	Pos.	Nation	Player
7	MF	POR	Hugo Seco (to (Portugal) Feirense)
8	MF	CZE	Jan Malík (to (Poland) Legionovia Legionowo)
11	MF	BUL	Vladislav Romanov (to Neftochimic Burgas)
27	MF	BUL	Iliyan Nedelchev (to Kaliakra Kavarna)
31	GK	CZE	Přemysl Kovář (to (Czech Republic) Slavia Prague)
40	GK	SRB	Aleksandar Čanović (released)

=== CSKA Sofia ===
In:

No.	Pos.	Nation	Player
7	MF	ECU	Kevin Mercado (on loan from (Spain) Granada)
8	FW	CGO	Kévin Koubemba (from (Belgium) Sint-Truiden)
9	FW	BRA	Fernando Karanga (from (South Korea) Jeju United)
5	DF	BUL	Nikolay Bodurov (Free agent)
24	MF	BUL	Rumen Rumenov (loan return from Neftochimic Burgas)

Out:

No.	Pos.	Nation	Player
1	GK	BUL	Anatoli Gospodinov (to (Poland) Chrobry Głogów)
7	MF	POR	Diogo Viana (to (Portugal) Belenenses)
8	MF	BUL	Boris Galchev (to Septemvri Sofia)
9	FW	BUL	Preslav Yordanov (to (Kazakhstan) Ordabasy)
24	DF	BUL	Lazar Marin (to Botev Plovdiv)
27	FW	BUL	Georgi Minchev (on loan to Tsarsko Selo)

=== Dunav Ruse ===
In:

No.	Pos.	Nation	Player
7	MF	BUL	Bircent Karagaren (from Lokomotiv Plovdiv)
21	DF	UKR	Oleksiy Larin (from (Ukraine) Dnipro)
23	DF	BUL	Hristofor Hubchev (from Beroe Stara Zagora)
99	FW	ALB	Ndue Mujeci (from Pirin Blagoevgrad)

Out:

No.	Pos.	Nation	Player
2	DF	BUL	Georgi Kremenliev (to Etar, previously on loan at Tsarsko Selo)
7	MF	BUL	Nikolay Kolev (to Nesebar)
12	MF	BUL	Svetoslav Chitakov (to Oborishte)
17	MF	BUL	Spas Georgiev (to Botev Vratsa)
18	MF	BUL	Anton Ognyanov (to Levski Sofia)
30	GK	BUL	Evgeni Aleksandrov (to Montana)
88	MF	BUL	Yanislav Ivanov (to Vereya)
91	MF	TJK	Nuriddin Davronov (on loan to (Tajikistan) Istiklol)

=== Levski Sofia ===
In:

No.	Pos.	Nation	Player
18	MF	BUL	Anton Ognyanov (from Dunav Ruse)
21	GK	BUL	Bozhidar Mitrev (from (Moldova) Sheriff Tiraspol)
26	FW	FRA	Amadou Soukouna (from Vereya)
28	DF	CZE	David Jablonský (from (Russia) Tom Tomsk)
89	GK	BUL	Nikolay Krastev (loan return from Nesebar)

Out:

No.	Pos.	Nation	Player
4	DF	BUL	Miki Orachev (on loan to Lokomotiv Sofia)
9	FW	BUL	Iliyan Mitsanski (to (Poland) Korona Kielce)
10	MF	BUL	Galin Ivanov (to Neftochimic Burgas)
11	FW	PER	Jean Deza (contract terminated)
19	FW	BUL	Iliya Dimitrov (on loan to Loko Sofia, previously on loan at Pirin)
21	GK	BUL	Ivan Čvorović (to Botev Plovdiv)
44	DF	BUL	Viktor Genev (to Botev Plovdiv)
88	MF	BUL	Georgi Yanev (on loan to Spartak Pleven)

=== Lokomotiv GO ===
In:

No.	Pos.	Nation	Player
9	FW	TUN	Sofien Moussa (from (Norway) Tromsø)
10	MF	BUL	Bedri Ryustemov (from (Spain) Atlético Saguntino)
15	DF	HAI	Jean Ambrose (from (France) Sedan)
16	GK	BUL	Petar Denchev (from Levski Karlovo)
22	MF	FRA	Karl Madianga (Free agent)
38	DF	COD	Aristote N'Dongala (from (Belgium) Sprimont)
75	FW	ALG	Mehdi Fennouche (Free agent)

Out:

No.	Pos.	Nation	Player
9	FW	BUL	Tihomir Kanev (to Etar)
10	FW	BUL	Yanaki Smirnov (loan return to Ludogorets Razgrad)
12	GK	BUL	Ivaylo Saykov (to Kariana Erden)
18	FW	BUL	Tsvetan Genkov (to (Kazakhstan) Okzhetpes)
19	MF	MTQ	Mathias Coureur (to (Kazakhstan) Kaisar)
30	MF	BUL	Dimo Atanasov (to Etar)
88	MF	BUL	Yordan Apostolov (to Etar)

=== Lokomotiv Plovdiv ===
In:

No.	Pos.	Nation	Player
3	DF	BUL	Aleksandar Tunchev (Free agent)
24	DF	MKD	Robert Petrov (from Bdin Vidin)
77	MF	SVN	Dino Martinović (Free agent)
90	DF	BRA	Choco (from Montana)

Out:

No.	Pos.	Nation	Player
7	MF	BUL	Georgi Valchev (to Neftochimic Burgas)
13	MF	BUL	Simeon Raykov (to (Netherlands) Roda)
18	MF	BUL	Martin Raynov (to Beroe Stara Zagora)
21	MF	BUL	Bircent Karagaren (to Dunav Ruse)
29	DF	FRA	Yassine Amrioui (to Tsarsko Selo)
44	DF	BUL	Ivaylo Markov (on loan to Tsarsko Selo)
93	FW	TUN	Aymen Souda (to Pirin Blagoevgrad)
98	MF	BUL	Georgi Chukalov (to Slavia Sofia U19)
—	MF	BUL	Zhak Pehlivanov (on loan to Nesebar, previously on loan at Rilski Sportist)

=== Ludogorets Razgrad ===
In:

No.	Pos.	Nation	Player
19	MF	BUL	Aleksandar Vasilev (loan return from Beroe Stara Zagora)
33	GK	BRA	Renan (from (Brazil) Avaí)
37	FW	BRA	João Paulo (from Botev Plovdiv)

Out:

No.	Pos.	Nation	Player
1	GK	CAN	Milan Borjan (on loan to (Poland) Korona Kielce)
33	GK	BUL	Georgi Argilashki (on loan to Vereya, previously on loan at Pirin)
55	DF	BUL	Georgi Terziev (on loan to (Croatia) Hajduk Split)
71	FW	BUL	Yanaki Smirnov (to (Serbia) Metalac, previously on loan at Loko GO)

=== Montana ===
In:

No.	Pos.	Nation	Player
1	GK	BUL	Evgeni Aleksandrov (from Dunav Ruse)
2	DF	SVN	Marko Jakolić (from (Slovenia) Brežice)
4	MF	BUL	Antoni Ivanov (from Sozopol)
5	DF	FRA	Birahim Sarr (from (Romania) Șoimii Pâncota)
12	GK	MSR	Corrin Brooks-Meade (from (Cyprus) Akritas Chlorakas)
17	DF	MNE	Blažo Igumanović (from (Montenegro) Mladost Podgorica)
21	MF	BUL	Daniel Gadzhev (Free agent)
24	DF	ARG	Santiago Villafañe (from (Croatia) RNK Split)
26	MF	SRB	Đorđe Ivelja (from (Serbia) Zemun)
28	FW	FRA	Saër Sène (from (Germany) Stuttgarter Kickers)
33	GK	MNE	Nemanja Šćekić (from (Serbia) Sinđelić Beograd)
77	FW	SRB	Nebojša Ivančević (Free agent)

Out:

No.	Pos.	Nation	Player
1	GK	BUL	Hristo Ivanov (to Oborishte)
4	FW	BRA	Danillo Bala (to (Brazil) Juazeirense)
5	DF	RUS	Anton Polyutkin (to (Moldova) Academia Chișinău)
6	DF	BUL	Tihomir Trifonov (to (Moldova) Zarya Bălți)
8	MF	BUL	Georgi Korudzhiev (to Tsarsko Selo)
12	GK	BUL	Pavel Zdravkov (to Tsarsko Selo)
13	DF	BUL	Raif Muradov (to Oborishte)
14	DF	GRE	Christos Kontochristos (released)
20	MF	BUL	Nikolay Chipev (released)
21	MF	BUL	Ivan Toshev (to Botev Vratsa)
23	DF	BRA	Choco (to Lokomotiv Plovdiv)
24	MF	BRA	Fernando Silva (to (North Macedonia) Pelister)
28	MF	BUL	Marquinhos (retired)
33	GK	BUL	Ivaylo Vasilev (to Neftochimic Burgas)

=== Neftochimic Burgas ===
In:

No.	Pos.	Nation	Player
3	DF	BUL	Georgi Hashev (from Sozopol)
6	MF	BUL	Georgi Valchev (from Lokomotiv Plovdiv)
10	MF	BUL	Galin Ivanov (from Levski Sofia)
11	MF	BUL	Vladislav Romanov (from Cherno More)
17	DF	NED	Randy Onuoha (from (Netherlands) Fortuna Sittard)
33	GK	BUL	Ivaylo Vasilev (from Montana)
71	DF	BUL	Iliya Milanov (from Beroe Stara Zagora)

Out:

No.	Pos.	Nation	Player
3	DF	BUL	Ivo Malinov (released)
5	DF	BUL	Zhivko Hadzhiev (to Pomorie)
6	DF	SRB	Marko Ranđelović (to (North Macedonia) Bregalnica Štip)
11	MF	BUL	Atanas Chipilov (to Bansko)
12	GK	BUL	Stoyan Kolev (retired)
16	DF	MKD	Bojan Gjorgievski (to (North Macedonia) Pobeda)
17	MF	BUL	Rumen Rumenov (loan return to CSKA Sofia)
31	DF	BUL	Daniel Andreev (to Sozopol)

=== Pirin Blagoevgrad ===
In:

No.	Pos.	Nation	Player
8	FW	BUL	Ivan Tsvetkov (Free agent)
9	MF	ENG	Ross Jenkins (Free agent)
10	FW	TUN	Aymen Souda (from Lokomotiv Plovdiv)
22	GK	BUL	Blagoy Makendzhiev (from Beroe Stara Zagora)

Out:

No.	Pos.	Nation	Player
8	FW	BUL	Iliya Dimitrov (loan return to Levski Sofia)
9	FW	BUL	Vladislav Zlatinov (to Bansko)
10	FW	ALB	Ndue Mujeci (to Dunav Ruse)
16	MF	BUL	Ventsislav Bengyuzov (to Vereya)
33	GK	BUL	Georgi Argilashki (loan return to Ludogorets Razgrad)

=== Slavia Sofia ===
In:

No.	Pos.	Nation	Player
2	DF	BUL	Dimitar Todorov (Free agent)
7	FW	BUL	Nasko Milev (from Botev Plovdiv)
17	MF	BUL	Stefan Velev (from (Georgia (country)) Dinamo Tbilisi)
18	DF	RUS	Daniil Maykov (from (Russia) Zenit-2 St. Petersburg)
33	FW	BUL	Kitan Vasilev (loan return from Vitosha Bistritsa)

Out:

No.	Pos.	Nation	Player
2	DF	BUL	Dimitar Burov (on loan to Spartak Pleven)
5	DF	ROU	Alexandru Giurgiu (to (Romania) Unirea Alba Iulia)
7	MF	BUL	Borislav Baldzhiyski (to Cherno More)
17	MF	BUL	Georg Iliev (released)
18	FW	RUS	Yevgeni Tyukalov (to (Russia) Ararat Moscow)
24	FW	BUL	Valeri Domovchiyski (to Vereya)
71	MF	BUL	Emil Stoev (on loan to Botev Vratsa)
77	MF	BUL	Nikolay Dimitrov (to (Russia) Ural Yekaterinburg)

=== Vereya ===
In:

No.	Pos.	Nation	Player
2	DF	GHA	Samuel Inkoom (from (Turkey) Antalyaspor)
4	DF	TUN	Selim Ben Djemia (Free agent)
17	FW	BUL	Valeri Domovchiyski (from Slavia Sofia)
18	MF	BUL	Yanislav Ivanov (from Dunav Ruse)
20	MF	BUL	Ventsislav Bengyuzov (from Pirin Blagoevgrad)
86	DF	BUL	Ivan Bandalovski (Free agent)
99	GK	BUL	Georgi Argilashki (on loan from Ludogorets Razgrad)

Out:

No.	Pos.	Nation	Player
9	FW	FRA	Amadou Soukouna (to Levski Sofia)
12	GK	BUL	Ivan Karadzhov (to (Belarus) Shakhtyor Soligorsk)
27	MF	BUL	Svetoslav Dikov (to Tsarsko Selo)
39	FW	BUL	Metodi Kostov (to Litex Lovech)
71	MF	BUL	Ivan Vinkov (on loan to Botev Galabovo)
89	MF	BUL	Veselin Vasev (to Litex Lovech)

== Second League ==
=== Bansko ===
In:

No.	Pos.	Nation	Player
1	GK	BUL	Angel Yusev (from Pirin Gotse Delchev)
2	MF	BUL	Radoslav Anev (from Pirin Gotse Delchev)
5	MF	URU	Mathias Herrera (from Pirin Razlog)
9	FW	BUL	Vladislav Zlatinov (from Pirin Blagoevgrad)
10	FW	BUL	Kaloyan Bonev (from Lokomotiv Sofia)
11	MF	BUL	Atanas Chipilov (from Neftochimic Burgas)
15	DF	BUL	Toni Stoichkov (from Sevlievo)
17	MF	BUL	Hristo Kirev (from Oborishte)
18	FW	NGA	Samson Jegede (from Pirin Razlog)
19	MF	CYP	Georgi Ivanov (from (Cyprus) Omonia)
20	MF	BUL	Stoyan Kadifchin (from Botev Ihtiman)
21	MF	BUL	Lyubomir Vitanov (from Pirin Gotse Delchev)
23	MF	BUL	Ilian Hristov (from Botev Galabovo)

Out:

No.	Pos.	Nation	Player
1	GK	BUL	Georgi Stavrev (to Botev Galabovo)
2	DF	BUL	Yordan Lechov (retired)
4	MF	BUL	Dzheyhan Zaydenov (to Pirin Razlog)
5	MF	BUL	Vasil Tudzharov (released)
6	MF	BRA	Eli Marques (to Oborishte)
10	MF	BUL	Krasimir Iliev (to Tsarsko Selo)
11	MF	BUL	Nikolay Hadzhinikolov (to Pirin Razlog)
13	FW	BUL	Hristiyan Vasilev (retired)
15	MF	BUL	Tsvetan Varsanov (to Pirin Razlog)
18	DF	BUL	Mario Dimitrov (released)
19	MF	BUL	Milen Lefterov (to Kariana Erden)
22	MF	BUL	Valeri Kulinov (to Strumska Slava)
24	FW	BUL	Angel Dimitrov (retired)

=== Botev Galabovo ===
In:

No.	Pos.	Nation	Player
1	GK	BUL	Georgi Stavrev (from Bansko)
15	MF	BUL	Milen Mitev (from Tsarsko Selo)
71	MF	BUL	Ivan Vinkov (on loan from Vereya)
74	MF	BUL	Denis Nikolov (from Slavia Sofia U19)

Out:

No.	Pos.	Nation	Player
8	MF	BUL	Ivan Kanev (released)
32	MF	BUL	Ilian Hristov (to Bansko)
73	DF	BUL	Martin Zdravchev (to Levski Karlovo)
91	GK	BUL	Pavel Kolev (to Rozova Dolina)

=== Botev Vratsa ===
In:

No.	Pos.	Nation	Player
3	DF	BUL	Mariyan Ivanov (Free agent)
4	DF	BUL	Ivo Harizanov (Free agent)
7	FW	BUL	Yanaki Smirnov (from (Serbia) Metalac)
8	MF	BUL	Ivan Toshev (from Montana)
11	MF	BUL	Pavel Golovodov (from CSKA Sofia II)
14	MF	BUL	Nikolay Marinov (from Slivnishki Geroy)
15	MF	BUL	Emil Stoev (on loan from Slavia Sofia)
16	MF	BUL	Lyubomir Tanev (from Belasitsa Petrich)
17	MF	BUL	Spas Georgiev (from Dunav Ruse)
21	MF	BUL	Iliya Karapetrov (from Etar)
27	GK	MDA	Nicolai Cebotari (from (Portugal) Leiria)
—	MF	BUL	Milen Vasilev (from (North Macedonia) Pelister)

Out:

No.	Pos.	Nation	Player
3	DF	BUL	Martin Dimov (to Tsarsko Selo)
4	DF	BUL	Georgi Peychev (to Septemvri Simitli)
5	DF	BUL	Lyubomir Iliev (to Sozopol)
6	MF	BUL	Dimitar Petkov (to Tsarsko Selo)
8	DF	BUL	Martin Sandov (to Oborishte)
11	MF	BUL	Krasimir Gavazov (released)
14	MF	BUL	Ivaylo Tsvetanov (to Balkan Botevgrad)
15	MF	BUL	Iliyan Iliev (to Minyor Pernik)
16	MF	BUL	Kaloyan Tsvetkov (to Bdin Vidin)
17	FW	BUL	Ventsislav Ivanov (to (Cyprus) Akritas Chlorakas)
18	MF	BUL	Daniel Vasev (to Lokomotiv Sofia)
22	MF	BUL	Pavel Petkov (to Tsarsko Selo)
27	GK	BUL	Ivan Ivanov (to Oborishte)
—	MF	BUL	Milen Vasilev (released)

=== CSKA Sofia II ===
In:

No.	Pos.	Nation	Player
11	FW	BUL	Aykut Ramadan (loan return from Tsarsko Selo)

Out:

No.	Pos.	Nation	Player
11	MF	BUL	Pavel Golovodov (to Botev Vratsa)
20	DF	BUL	Vasil Popov (on loan to Tsarsko Selo)

=== Etar ===
In:

No.	Pos.	Nation	Player
3	DF	BUL	Georgi Kremenliev (from Dunav Ruse)
20	FW	BUL	Todor Kolev (from Hebar Pazardzhik)
22	MF	BUL	Dimo Atanasov (from Lokomotiv GO)
73	FW	BUL	Ivan Stoyanov (from Botev Plovdiv)
88	MF	BUL	Yordan Apostolov (from Lokomotiv GO)
99	FW	BUL	Tihomir Kanev (from Lokomotiv GO)

Out:

No.	Pos.	Nation	Player
7	DF	BUL	Aleksandar Kirilov (to Litex Lovech)
20	FW	ARG	Guido Abayián (to (Uruguay) Atenas)
21	MF	BUL	Iliya Karapetrov (to Botev Vratsa)
22	MF	BUL	Nikolay Tsvetkov (to Septemvri Sofia)
88	FW	BUL	Petar Dimitrov (to Kariana Erden)

=== Levski Karlovo ===
In:

No.	Pos.	Nation	Player
1	GK	BUL	Tsvetan Todorov (from Rozova Dolina)
6	DF	BUL	Petar Raykov (from Rakovski)
7	MF	ALB	Andi Renja (from (Greece) Diagoras Sevasti)
10	MF	BUL	Lachezar Angelov (from Nesebar)
11	MF	BUL	Angel Zdravchev (from Litex Lovech)
12	GK	BUL	Ferdi Myumyunov (from Borislav Parvomay)
15	DF	BUL	Boyan Iliev (from (Greece) Eordaikos)
16	DF	GRE	Ioannis Dinotakis (Free agent)
18	MF	BUL	Mihael Kisyov (from Velbazhd Kyustendil)
20	DF	BUL	Martin Zdravchev (from Botev Galabovo)
21	FW	BUL	Valentin Slivov (from Borislav Parvomay)
22	FW	FRA	Kevin N'Cho (from (France) Dieppe)
30	MF	BUL	Boyan Penev (from Minyor Radnevo)

Out:

No.	Pos.	Nation	Player
1	GK	BUL	Petar Denchev (to Lokomotiv GO)
4	DF	BUL	Ivaylo Avramov (to Eurocollege Plovdiv)
6	MF	BUL	Radoslav Apostolov (loan return to Botev Plovdiv)
7	MF	BUL	Hristo Yanchev (to Maritsa Plovdiv)
8	MF	BUL	Teodor Stefanov (to Rodopa Smolyan)
10	FW	BUL	Georgi Stefanov (to Oborishte)
11	FW	BUL	Ismet Ramadan (loan return to Botev Plovdiv)
12	GK	BUL	Vasil Kuzmanov (to Borislav Parvomay)
16	MF	BUL	Tsvetan Pavlov (to Hebar Pazardzhik)
30	MF	BUL	Vladimir Michev (released)

=== Lokomotiv Sofia ===
In:

No.	Pos.	Nation	Player
3	DF	BUL	Evgeni Zyumbyulev (from Tsarsko Selo)
11	MF	BUL	Aleksandar Manolov (from Septemvri Sofia)
14	DF	BUL	Nikola Ivanov (Free agent)
18	DF	BUL	Miki Orachev (on loan from Levski Sofia)
19	MF	BUL	Aleksandar Aleksandrov (Free agent)
21	FW	BUL	Iliya Dimitrov (on loan from Levski Sofia)
94	MF	BUL	Daniel Vasev (from Botev Vratsa)

Out:

No.	Pos.	Nation	Player
11	FW	BUL	Kaloyan Angelov (released)
14	FW	BUL	Kaloyan Bonev (to Bansko)
16	MF	BUL	Yordan Rizov (to Balkan Botevgrad)
18	MF	BUL	Zlatko Bonev (released)
19	MF	BUL	Viliyan Komitski (released)
21	MF	BUL	Borislav Midilev (to CSKA 1948 Sofia)

=== Ludogorets Razgrad II ===
In:

No.	Pos.	Nation	Player

Out:

No.	Pos.	Nation	Player
23	FW	BUL	Georgi Netov (to Oborishte)
83	DF	BUL	Hristo Popadiyn (to Vitosha Bistritsa)

=== Nesebar ===
In:

No.	Pos.	Nation	Player
1	GK	BUL	Stamen Boyadzhiev (from Svilengrad)
6	MF	BUL	Daniel Benchev (from Chernomorets Burgas)
7	MF	BUL	Nikolay Kolev (from Dunav Ruse)
15	DF	BUL	Emin Ahmed (on loan from Beroe Stara Zagora)
15	DF	CHN	Zheng Zixiang (from (Portugal) Oliveira do Hospital)
21	MF	BUL	Zhak Pehlivanov (on loan from Lokomotiv Plovdiv)
26	DF	BUL	Zhivko Dinev (Free agent)
28	MF	BUL	Daniel Stoyanov (from Pomorie)

Out:

No.	Pos.	Nation	Player
1	GK	BUL	Nikolay Krastev (loan return to Levski Sofia)
5	DF	BUL	Plamen Tenev (loan return to Beroe Stara Zagora)
8	DF	BUL	Stoyan Kalev (to Svilengrad)
15	GK	BUL	Borislav Totev (retired)
21	MF	BUL	Lachezar Angelov (to Levski Karlovo)
28	MF	BUL	Rangel Ignatov (loan return to Botev Plovdiv)
32	FW	BUL	Vladislav Mirchev (to (Malaysia) Perak TBG)

=== Oborishte ===
In:

No.	Pos.	Nation	Player
1	GK	BUL	Hristo Ivanov (from Montana)
3	DF	BUL	Lyubomir Gutsev (from Tsarsko Selo)
11	FW	BUL	Georgi Netov (from Ludogorets Razgrad II)
12	GK	BUL	Ivan Ivanov (from Botev Vratsa)
13	DF	BUL	Raif Muradov (from Montana)
15	MF	BUL	Svetoslav Chitakov (from Dunav Ruse)
17	FW	BUL	Dimitar Aleksiev (Free agent)
18	MF	BUL	Kristiyan Ivanov (from Hebar Pazardzhik)
28	MF	BRA	Eli Marques (from Bansko)
77	FW	BUL	Georgi Stefanov (from Levski Karlovo)
88	DF	BUL	Martin Sandov (from Botev Vratsa)
90	MF	BUL	Antonio Tsankov (from Pirin Gotse Delchev)

Out:

No.	Pos.	Nation	Player
3	DF	GRE	Lazaros Fotias (to (Slovakia) Topvar Topoľčany)
12	GK	BUL	Filip Dimitrov (to Tsarsko Selo)
13	DF	ALG	Nabil Ejenavi (released)
15	FW	BUL	Anatoli Todorov (released)
17	MF	BUL	Hristo Kirev (to Bansko)
18	DF	BUL	Stoyan Georgiev (to Balkan Botevgrad)
22	DF	BUL	Angel Parpulov (to Svoboda Peshtera)
73	GK	BUL	Aleksandar Vitanov (released)
80	MF	BUL	Emil Kamberov (loan return to Botev Plovdiv)
88	MF	BUL	Stoyno Solakov (released)

=== Pomorie ===
In:

No.	Pos.	Nation	Player
6	MF	BUL	Stanislav Dryanov (from Beroe Stara Zagora)
19	DF	BUL	Zhivko Hadzhiev (from Neftochimic Burgas)

Out:

No.	Pos.	Nation	Player
6	MF	BUL	Daniel Stamatov (to Svilengrad)
7	MF	BUL	Daniel Stoyanov (to Nesebar)
15	MF	BUL	Martin Ivanov (to Karnobat)
19	MF	GHA	Michael Tawiah (to (Japan) Vonds Ichihara)

=== Septemvri Sofia ===
In:

No.	Pos.	Nation	Player
7	MF	BUL	Nikolay Tsvetkov (from Etar)
10	FW	BUL	Radoslav Vasilev (Free agent)
21	MF	BUL	Yanko Sandanski (Free agent)
23	MF	BUL	Ivo Ivanov (Free agent)
25	MF	BUL	Boris Galchev (from CSKA Sofia)

Out:

No.	Pos.	Nation	Player
7	MF	BUL	Aleksandar Manolov (to Lokomotiv Sofia)
10	FW	BUL	Bozhidar Katsarov (to Tsarsko Selo)
16	FW	BUL	Boris Pantaleev (to (Spain) Compostela)
18	DF	BUL	Asparuh Smilkov (to (Spain) Compostela)
21	MF	BUL	Blagoy Nakov (to Belasitsa Petrich)

=== Sozopol ===
In:

No.	Pos.	Nation	Player
5	DF	BUL	Lyubomir Iliev (from Botev Vratsa)
14	DF	BUL	Martin Sechkov (Free agent)
20	FW	BUL	Georgi Petrov (from Borislav Parvomay)
25	DF	BUL	Daniel Andreev (from Neftochimic Burgas)
—	MF	BUL	Vilen Gegamyan (Free agent)

Out:

No.	Pos.	Nation	Player
5	DF	BUL	Petko Ganev (to Litex Lovech)
8	MF	BUL	Antoni Ivanov (to Montana)
14	DF	BUL	Georgi Radev (to Tsarsko Selo)
25	DF	BUL	Ivan Stoyanov (to Neftochimic Burgas U19)
69	DF	BUL	Georgi Hashev (to Neftochimic Burgas)

=== Spartak Pleven ===
In:

No.	Pos.	Nation	Player
9	MF	COD	Ken Mabika Tassin (from (Romania) Metalul Reșița)
17	FW	BUL	Zahari Yankov (from Velbazhd Kyustendil)
18	DF	BUL	Nikolay Nikolaev (from Hebar Pazardzhik)
23	DF	BUL	Dimitar Burov (on loan from Slavia Sofia)
27	MF	BUL	Velimir Popchev (Free agent)
30	DF	CGO	Rodrigue Nanitelamio (Free agent)
62	MF	BUL	Georgi Chakarov (Free agent)
88	MF	BUL	Georgi Yanev (on loan from Levski Sofia)

Out:

No.	Pos.	Nation	Player
6	MF	BUL	Anton Slavchev (to Minyor Pernik)
8	FW	BUL	Viktor Mitov (released)
9	FW	BUL	Stefan Hristov (to Vitosha Bistritsa)
11	MF	BUL	Kiril Valov (to Velbazhd Kyustendil)
12	FW	BUL	Kristiyan Dimitrov (released)
13	DF	BUL	Teodor Kolarov (released)
17	MF	BUL	Nikolay Velkov (to Chepinets Velingrad)
20	MF	BUL	Preslav Antonov (to Litex Lovech)

=== Tsarsko Selo ===
In:

No.	Pos.	Nation	Player
1	GK	BUL	Pavel Zdravkov (from Montana)
2	DF	BUL	Georgi Radev (from Sozopol)
3	DF	BUL	Martin Dimov (from Botev Vratsa)
4	DF	BUL	Ivaylo Markov (on loan from Lokomotiv Plovdiv)
5	MF	BUL	Svetoslav Dikov (from Vereya)
8	MF	BUL	Pavel Petkov (from Botev Vratsa)
9	FW	BUL	Georgi Minchev (on loan from CSKA Sofia)
10	DF	FRA	Yassine Amrioui (from Lokomotiv Plovdiv)
12	GK	BUL	Filip Dimitrov (from Oborishte)
14	FW	BUL	Bozhidar Katsarov (from Septemvri Sofia)
15	MF	BUL	Georgi Korudzhiev (from Montana)
16	MF	BUL	Dimitar Petkov (from Botev Vratsa)
18	DF	BUL	Vasil Popov (on loan from CSKA Sofia II)
19	MF	BUL	Krasimir Iliev (from Bansko)
21	DF	BUL	Viktor Raychev (Free agent)

Out:

No.	Pos.	Nation	Player
1	GK	BUL	Stoyan Despotov (to CSKA 1948)
2	DF	BUL	Georgi Kremenilev (loan return to Dunav Ruse)
3	DF	BUL	Evgeni Zyumbyulev (to Lokomotiv Sofia)
4	MF	BUL	Milen Mitev (to Botev Galabovo)
5	DF	BUL	Lyubomir Gutsev (to Oborishte)
8	MF	BUL	Milen Ivanov (to Chepinets Velingrad)
9	FW	BUL	Aleksandar Kirov (to (Austria) Andorf)
12	GK	BUL	Aleksandar Stoyanov (released)
14	MF	BUL	Antonio Hadzhiivanov (released)
16	FW	BUL	Aykut Ramadan (loan return to CSKA Sofia II)
18	MF	BUL	Vladimir Baharov (to Minyor Pernik)
19	MF	BUL	Stoyko Ivanov (to Septemvri Simitli)
23	MF	BUL	Dimitar Kolarov (released)
25	DF	BUL	Miroslav Ivanov (to Minyor Pernik)
29	FW	BUL	Aleksandar Asparuhov (to Strumska Slava)

=== Vitosha Bistritsa ===
In:

No.	Pos.	Nation	Player
6	DF	BUL	Hristo Popadiyn (from Ludogorets Razgrad II)
8	FW	BUL	Stefan Hristov (from Spartak Pleven)
31	MF	BUL	Petko Tsankov (from Chernomorets Balchik)

Out:

No.	Pos.	Nation	Player
8	MF	BUL	Evgeni Grozdin (to Slivniski Geroy)
11	FW	BUL	Kitan Vasilev (loan return to Slavia Sofia)
19	DF	BUL	Velizar Andonov (retired)
23	FW	BUL	Boris Tyutyukov (loan return to Botev Plovdiv)
