= Ilian Iliev (footballer, born 1999) =

Bulgarian footballer

Ilian Iliev Jr.
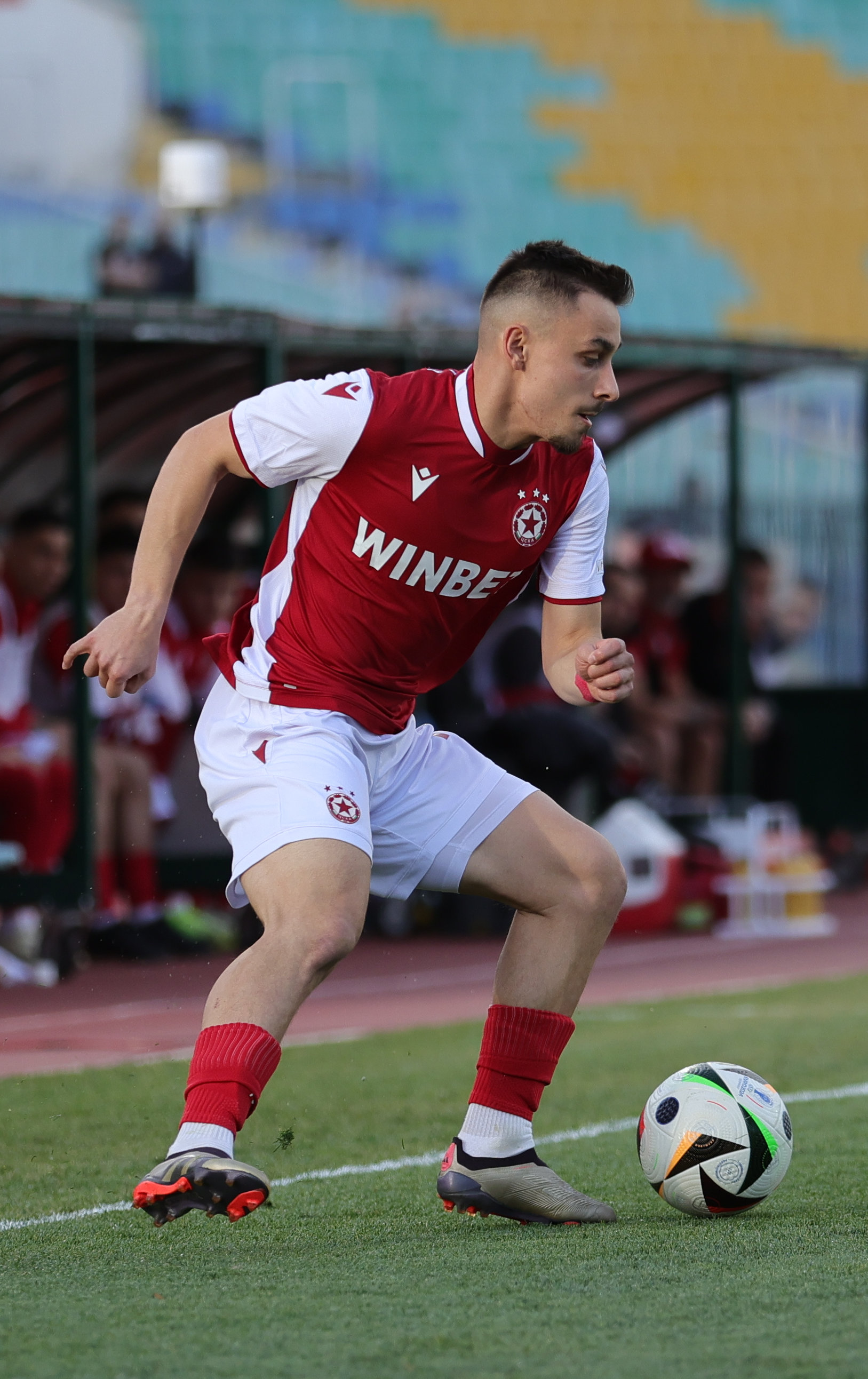
- Iliev in 2025

Personal information
- Full name: Ilian Ilianov Iliev
- Date of birth: 20 August 1999 (age 27)
- Place of birth: Funchal, Portugal
- Height: 1.73 m (5 ft 8 in)
- Positions: Attacking midfielder; winger

Team information
- Current team: İstanbulspor
- Number: 10

Youth career
- 2006–2017: Cherno More
- 2017–2019: Académica de Coimbra

Senior career*
Years	Team	Apps	(Gls)
2016–2017	Cherno More	3	(0)
2017–2019	Académica de Coimbra	0	(0)
2019–2021	Cherno More	46	(5)
2021–2024	Apollon Limassol	49	(2)
2023–2024	→ Kifisia (loan)	19	(0)
2024	→ Cherno More (loan)	13	(0)
2024–2026	CSKA Sofia	50	(4)
2026–	İstanbulspor	12	(1)

International career^{‡}
2017	Bulgaria U18	5	(0)
2019–2020	Bulgaria U21	5	(1)
2021–	Bulgaria	21	(0)
- * Club domestic league appearances and goals as of 24 October 2026 ‡ National team caps and goals as of 10 June 2025

Ilian Ilianov Iliev (Bulgarian: Илиан Илианов Илиев; born 20 August 1999), also known as Ilian Iliev Jr., is a Bulgarian professional footballer who plays as an attacking midfielder for Turkish TFF 1. Lig club İstanbulspor.

== Club career ==
Ilian made his first team league début in a 1–3 home defeat against Ludogorets on 9 September 2016, coming on as substitute for Georgi Iliev. He scored his first goal in the top division of Bulgarian football on 30 August 2019, in the 1–1 draw with Dunav Ruse.

On 31 July 2017, Iliev joined Académica de Coimbra's academy.

On 19 July 2021, Iliev agreed a deal to join Cypriot First Division side Apollon Limassol on a four-year contract. Having spent the first half of the 2023–24 season on loan with A.E. Kifisia, Iliev returned to Cherno More on loan for the remainder of the season in February 2024.

Iliev signed a contract with CSKA Sofia on 3 September 2024.

Iliev joined the Turkish 1. Lig club İstanbulspor on 24 June 2026.

== International career ==
Iliev made his debut for Bulgaria national team on 25 March 2021 in a World Cup qualifier against Switzerland.

== Personal life ==
He is the son of former footballer and current manager Ilian Iliev Sr.

== Career statistics ==
=== Club ===
As of 29 August 2026

Appearances and goals by club, season and competition
Club	Season	League			Cup		Continental		Other		Total	
Club	Season	Division	Apps	Goals	Apps	Goals	Apps	Goals	Apps	Goals	Apps	Goals
Cherno More	2016–17	First League	3	0	1	0	—		—		4	0
Académica de Coimbra	2017–18	LigaPro	0	0	0	0	—		—		0	0
Académica de Coimbra	2018–19	LigaPro	0	0	0	0	—		—		0	0
Académica de Coimbra	Total		0	0	0	0	—		—		0	0
Cherno More	2019–20	First League	20	3	1	0	—		—		21	3
Cherno More	2020–21	First League	27	2	1	0	—		—		28	2
Cherno More	Total		47	5	2	0	—		—		49	5
Apollon Limassol	2021–22	Cypriot First Division	25	1	1	0	1	0	—		27	1
Apollon Limassol	2022–23	Cypriot First Division	24	1	1	0	—		—		25	1
Apollon Limassol	Total		49	1	2	0	1	0	0	0	52	2
Kifisia (loan)	2023–24	Super League Greece	19	0	3	0	—		—		22	0
Cherno More (loan)	2023–24	First League	13	0	—		—		—		13	0
CSKA Sofia	2024–25	First League	26	3	6	1	—		1	0	33	4
CSKA Sofia	2025–26	First League	24	1	3	0	—		0	0	27	1
CSKA Sofia	Total		50	4	9	1	0	0	1	0	60	5
İstanbulspor	2026–27	TFF 1. Lig	4	1	0	0	—		—		4	1
Career total			185	12	17	1	1	0	1	0	204	13

=== International ===
As of match played 10 June 2025

Appearances and goals by national team and year
National team	Year	Apps	Goals
Bulgaria	2021	6	0
Bulgaria	2022	3	0
Bulgaria	2023	3	0
Bulgaria	2024	5	0
Bulgaria	2025	4	0
Total		21	0

== Honours ==
Apollon Limassol

- Cypriot First Division: 2021–22

CSKA Sofia

- Bulgarian Cup: 2025–26
