= Marek Kuzma =

Slovak footballer (born 1988)

Personal information
- Date of birth: 22 June 1988 (age 38)
- Place of birth: Trenčín, Czechoslovakia
- Height: 1.82 m (6 ft 0 in)
- Position: Forward

Team information
- Current team: ViOn Zlaté Moravce
- Number: 29

Youth career
- 2003–2007: Dubnica

Senior career*
Years	Team	Apps	(Gls)
2006–2009	Dubnica	76	(10)
2009	→ Dukla Banská Bystrica (loan)	19	(4)
2010–2014	Slovan Bratislava	39	(2)
2011	→ Dubnica (loan)	13	(3)
2012	→ Dukla Banská Bystrica (loan)	12	(0)
2012	→ Slovácko (loan)	5	(0)
2014–2015	Spartak Myjava	28	(6)
2015	Iskra Borčice	6	(0)
2016	ViOn Zlaté Moravce	13	(3)
2016–2018	Cherno More Varna	62	(13)
2018	Puszcza Niepołomice	10	(1)
2019	iClinic Sereď	12	(0)
2019–2021	Dubnica	65	(24)
2022–2023	Železiarne Podbrezová	52	(17)
2024–2026	ViOn Zlaté Moravce	69	(20)
2026-	FK Pohronie	0	(0)

International career
2006–2007	Slovakia U19	17	(1)
2009–2010	Slovakia U21	6	(0)
- * Club domestic league appearances and goals as of 17 May 2026

Marek Kuzma (born 22 June 1988) is a Slovak professional footballer who last played as a forward for FK Pohronie.

== Career ==
On 20 July 2016, Kuzma signed with Bulgarian First League club Cherno More. He became the team's topscorer for the 2016–17 season but left the club in May 2018 when his contract expired.

On 20 June 2018, Kuzma signed for I liga side Puszcza Niepołomice.

== Honours ==
Slovan Bratislava

- Slovak First Football League: 2012–13
- Slovak Cup: 2009–10, 2012–13
