= Plamen Nikolov (footballer, born 1985) =

Bulgarian footballer

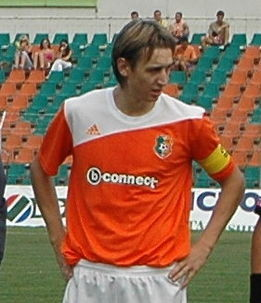

Personal information
- Full name: Plamen Venelinov Nikolov
- Date of birth: 12 June 1985 (age 41)
- Place of birth: Pleven, Bulgaria
- Height: 1.91 m (6 ft 3 in)
- Position: Centre-back

Youth career
- Spartak Pleven
- Levski Sofia

Senior career*
Years	Team	Apps	(Gls)
2004–2006	Spartak Pleven	51	(1)
2006–2012	Litex Lovech	107	(4)
2012	→ Tom Tomsk (loan)	10	(0)
2012–2013	Tom Tomsk	30	(1)
2014	Litex Lovech	5	(0)
2014–2015	Botev Plovdiv	42	(0)
2016–2017	Cherno More	41	(2)
2017	Lokomotiv Plovdiv	15	(0)
2018–2022	Litex Lovech	108	(7)
Total		409	(15)

International career
2009–2011	Bulgaria	5	(0)
- * Club domestic league appearances and goals

Plamen Venelinov Nikolov (Bulgarian: Пламен Венелинов Николов; born 12 June 1985) is a Bulgarian former professional footballer who played as a defender.

== Career ==
=== Spartak Pleven ===
Nikolov was born in Pleven. After emerging through Levski Sofia's youth system, he made his professional debut in the second level with Spartak Pleven, the club from his home town. He made his team début on 7 August 2004, in an 0–0 draw against Rilski Sportist Samokov. On 6 October 2004 Nikolov scored his first goal in a 6–0 drubbing of amateur side Botev Lukovit of Bulgarian Cup.

Plamen quickly became part of the main team and for two seasons earned 53 appearances, scoring two goals.

=== Litex Lovech ===
In June 2006, Nikolov agreed a deal to sign for Litex Lovech for an undisclosed fee. He has made his debut for Litex in Rilski Sportist match on 13 August 2006 as an 85th-minute substitute. During his first season in Litex, Nikolov found regular starting positions in defence hard to find. He played only 5 matches in the domestic league.

In 2007–08 A PFG season coach of Litex Miodrag Ješić decided to put Nikolov into the starting line-up as center back. In this season, he earned 22 appearances playing in the A PFG, scored one goal. In the Bulgarian Cup, he played three matches, and in the UEFA Cup, he played 6 matches. Nikolov also won his first trophy in his career - the Bulgarian Cup. In the final against Cherno More he played 90 minutes.

In the 2008–09 season Nikolov won Bulgarian Cup for the second time. On 25 October 2010, he was sent off in the 2:1 home win against Levski Sofia after an altercation with Darko Tasevski.

=== FC Tom Tomsk ===
In February 2012 Nikolov signed for FC Tom Tomsk on loan until the end of the season, before joining the club permanently in the summer of the same year.

=== Return to Litex Lovech ===
In January 2014 Nikolov re-signed for Litex Lovech.

=== Botev Plovdiv ===
On 30 July 2014 Plamen Nikolov signed a contract with Botev Plovdiv until the end of the season. Four days later he made a debut for the club during the 2:1 win over Cherno More Varna.

Nikolov quickly became a key player for Botev Plovdiv and took part in a lot of important games, including the 0–2 away win over the local rivals Lokomotiv Plovdiv. On 16 May, Nikolov was sent off with a direct red card after a conflict with Toni Silva from CSKA Sofia, who was also sent off. Despite his absence in the final 35 minutes Botev won the game with 3–2.

On 17 June, Nikolov extended his contract with Botev until the end of 2015–16 season.

Nikolov terminated his contract on mutual agreement and left Botev Plovdiv in January 2016.

=== Lokomotiv Plovdiv ===
On 10 July 2017, Nikolov signed with Lokomotiv Plovdiv.

== Career statistics ==
As of 21 May 2017

Club	Season	League		Cups		Europe		Total	
Club	Season	Apps	Goals	Apps	Goals	Apps	Goals	Apps	Goals
Spartak Pleven	2004–05	27	1	1	1	0	0	28	2
Spartak Pleven	2005–06	24	0	2	0	0	0	26	0
Spartak Pleven	Total	51	1	3	1	0	0	54	2
Litex Lovech	2006–07	5	0	0	0	1	0	6	0
Litex Lovech	2007–08	22	1	4	0	6	0	32	1
Litex Lovech	2008–09	20	2	5	0	3	0	28	2
Litex Lovech	2009–10	27	1	3	0	2	0	32	1
Litex Lovech	2010–11	21	0	5	0	5	0	31	0
Litex Lovech	2011–12	12	0	2	0	4	0	18	0
Litex Lovech	Total	107	4	19	0	21	0	147	4
Tom Tomsk	2011–12	10	0	0	0	-	-	10	0
Tom Tomsk	2012–13	27	1	1	0	-	-	27	1
Tom Tomsk	2013–14	3	0	0	0	-	-	3	0
Tom Tomsk	Total	40	1	1	0	0	0	41	1
Litex Lovech	2013–14	5	0	2	0	0	0	7	0
Litex Lovech	Total	5	0	2	0	0	0	7	0
Botev Plovdiv	2014–15	23	0	3	0	-	-	26	0
Botev Plovdiv	2015–16	19	0	2	0	-	-	21	0
Botev Plovdiv	Total	42	0	5	0	0	0	47	0
Cherno More	2015–16	14	0	-	-	-	-	14	0
Cherno More	2016–17	27	2	3	0	-	-	30	2
Cherno More	Total	41	2	3	0	0	0	44	2
Lokomotiv Plovdiv	2017–18	0	0	0	0	-	-	0	0
Lokomotiv Plovdiv	Total	0	0	0	0	0	0	0	0
Career Total		286	8	33	1	21	0	340	9

== Honours ==
Litex Lovech

- Bulgarian A Group (2): 2009–10, 2010–11
- Bulgarian Supercup: 2010
- Bulgarian Cup (2): 2007–08, 2008–09
