= Birahim Sarr =

French footballer (born 1991)

Personal information
- Date of birth: 27 July 1991 (age 35)
- Place of birth: Troyes, France
- Height: 1.82 m (6 ft 0 in)
- Position: Centre back

Team information
- Current team: Västerås SK
- Number: 21

Senior career*
Years	Team	Apps	(Gls)
2010–2014	ASSRC		
2014	N&S Erimis	11	(0)
2015–2016	AFM Romilly		
2016	Șoimii Pâncota	6	(0)
2017	Montana	15	(0)
2018–	Västerås SK	0	(0)
- * Club domestic league appearances and goals as of 4 December 2017

Birahim Sarr (born 27 July 1991) is a French footballer who plays as a defender for the Swedish club Västerås SK.

== Career ==
=== Montana ===
On 15 January 2017, Sarr signed a 1-year contract with Bulgarian First League side Montana, after impressing in a single training session and one friendly game against Kariana Erden. On 1 March 2017, he made his debut in a 1–0 away win against relegation rivals Lokomotiv Gorna Oryahovitsa, keeping a rare clean sheet in the team's first away victory of the season. He was released in June 2017 due to a relegation clause in his contract. On 24 August 2017, Sarr returned to his former team Montana in order to play in the Bulgarian Second League.
