= Pedro Marques (footballer, born 1988) =

Portuguese footballer

Pedrito
Personal information
- Full name: Pedro Alexandre Mendes Marques
- Date of birth: 31 March 1988 (age 38)
- Place of birth: Figueira da Foz, Portugal
- Height: 1.80 m (5 ft 11 in)
- Position: Midfielder

Youth career
- 1996–1999: Naval
- 1999–2003: Sporting CP
- 2003–2005: Académica
- 2005–2006: Naval
- 2006–2007: Real Madrid

Senior career*
Years	Team	Apps	(Gls)
2007–2010	Real Madrid C	73	(13)
2010–2011	San Roque	28	(2)
2012–2013	Farense	11	(0)
2013–2014	Libolo	39	(6)
2015–2016	Interclube	23	(5)
2016–2017	Beroe Stara Zagora	5	(0)
2017	Gil Vicente	9	(0)
- * Club domestic league appearances and goals as of 2 August 2017

Pedro Alexandre Mendes Marques (born 31 March 1988), commonly known as Pedrito, is a Portuguese professional footballer who plays as a midfielder.

== Football career ==
Born in Figueira da Foz, Coimbra District, Marques played youth football with three clubs, including Sporting Clube de Portugal from ages 11–15. He moved abroad in 2006, going on to spend his last as a junior with Real Madrid.

In Spain, Marques never competed in higher than Segunda División B, representing Real Madrid C and CD San Roque de Lepe. In the 2011–12 season, he did not feature for any team.

Marques returned to his country in the 2012 summer, signing with S.C. Farense in the third level. He changed sides and countries again in the following transfer window, going on to make his professional debut in the Angolan Girabola with C.R.D. Libolo and later playing with G.D. Interclube also in that nation.

On 31 March 2016, Marques agreed to a contract with Bulgarian club PFC Beroe Stara Zagora after a successful trial period. He was released in December.

In January 2017, Marques joined Gil Vicente.
