= Jan Malík =

Czech footballer

Personal information
- Date of birth: 7 April 1992 (age 34)
- Place of birth: Brno, Czechoslovakia
- Height: 1.80 m (5 ft 11 in)
- Positions: Defensive midfielder; centre-back

Team information
- Current team: SK Raika Ernstbrunn
- Number: 8

Youth career
- –2011: Zbrojovka Brno

Senior career*
Years	Team	Apps	(Gls)
2011–2013	Zbrojovka Brno B	17	(0)
2011	→ Sparta Brno (loan)	3	(0)
2011–2012	→ Líšeň (loan)	22	(1)
2013–2016	Zbrojovka Brno	60	(3)
2013	→ Třinec (loan)	10	(0)
2016	Cherno More Varna	10	(0)
2017	Legionovia Legionowo	13	(0)
2017–2018	Líšeň		
2018	Vítkovice	8	(0)
2018–	SK Raika Ernstbrunn	104	(37)

International career
2014	Czech Republic U21	2	(0)
- * Club domestic league appearances and goals as of 10 February 2024

Jan Malík (born 7 April 1992) is a Czech footballer who plays as a midfielder for Austrian club SK Raika Ernstbrunn.

== Career ==
He made his debut in Czech First League on 22 May 2013 in the home match against Sparta.

On 27 June 2016, Malík signed for Bulgarian First League club Cherno More. On 31 July 2016, he made his debut in a 3–1 away win against Pirin Blagoevgrad, coming on as substitute for Hugo Seco. He was released in December.

On 3 March 2017, Malík joined Polish side Legionovia Legionowo.
