= Filip Hlúpik =

Czech footballer

Personal information
- Date of birth: 30 April 1991 (age 35)
- Place of birth: Uherské Hradiště, Czech Republic
- Height: 1.80 m (5 ft 11 in)
- Position: Winger

Team information
- Current team: FK Fotbal Třinec
- Number: 15

Youth career
- 1. FC Slovácko

Senior career*
Years	Team	Apps	(Gls)
2010–2016	1. FC Slovácko	96	(9)
2017	Cherno More	4	(0)
2017	IFK Mariehamn	9	(0)
2018–2019	1. FK Příbram	32	(4)
2019–2021	Fotbal Třinec	30	(5)
2021-	USC Mank	3	(0)

International career
2008–2009	Czech Republic U18	3	(0)
2011	Czech Republic U20	1	(0)
- * Club domestic league appearances and goals as of 13 August 2019

Filip Hlúpik (born 30 April 1991) is a professional Czech football player who plays for USC Mank.

== Career ==
Hlúpik started his professional career at his hometown club 1. FC Slovácko. On 7 February 2017, he signed for Bulgarian club Cherno More Varna. On 19 February, he made his debut in a 0–2 home defeat against CSKA Sofia, coming on as substitute for Pirulo. On 29 May 2017, his contract was terminated by mutual consent.

On 8 August 2017, Hlúpik signed a short-term contract with Ålandic club Mariehamn.

He was called up to the Czech Republic national under-21 team in 2011, but failed to make an appearance.
