= Ondřej Sukup =

Czech footballer (born 1988)

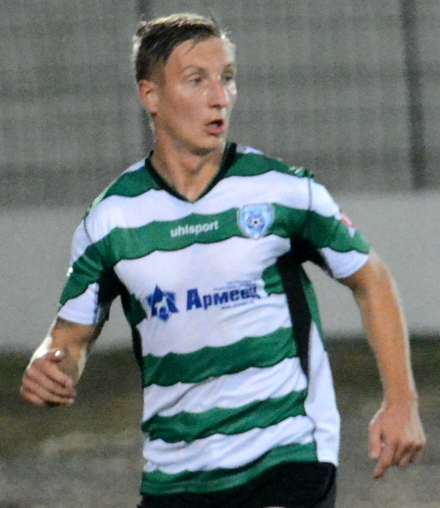

Personal information
- Date of birth: 8 December 1988 (age 37)
- Place of birth: Uherské Hradiště, Czechoslovakia
- Height: 1.77 m (5 ft 9 1/2 in)
- Position: Right back

Team information
- Current team: Blansko
- Number: 73

Youth career
- Slovácko

Senior career*
Years	Team	Apps	(Gls)
2008–2010	FK Šardice		
2010–2012	Znojmo	58	(2)
2013	Sigma Olomouc	2	(0)
2013–2016	Baník Ostrava	37	(0)
2016–2017	Cherno More	54	(1)
2018–2020	Zbrojovka Brno	29	(1)
2020–2021	Blansko	15	(1)
2021–2024	Hodonín	54	(2)
2024	Alpenvorland		
2025	1. FC Polešovice		
2025–	Guntersdorf		
- * Club domestic league appearances and goals as of 21:56, 1 August 2021 (UTC)

Ondřej Sukup (born 8 December 1988) is a Czech professional footballer who plays as a right back for FK Blansko.

He had previously played for Znojmo, Sigma Olomouc and Baník Ostrava.
