= Borislav Baldzhiyski =

Bulgarian footballer

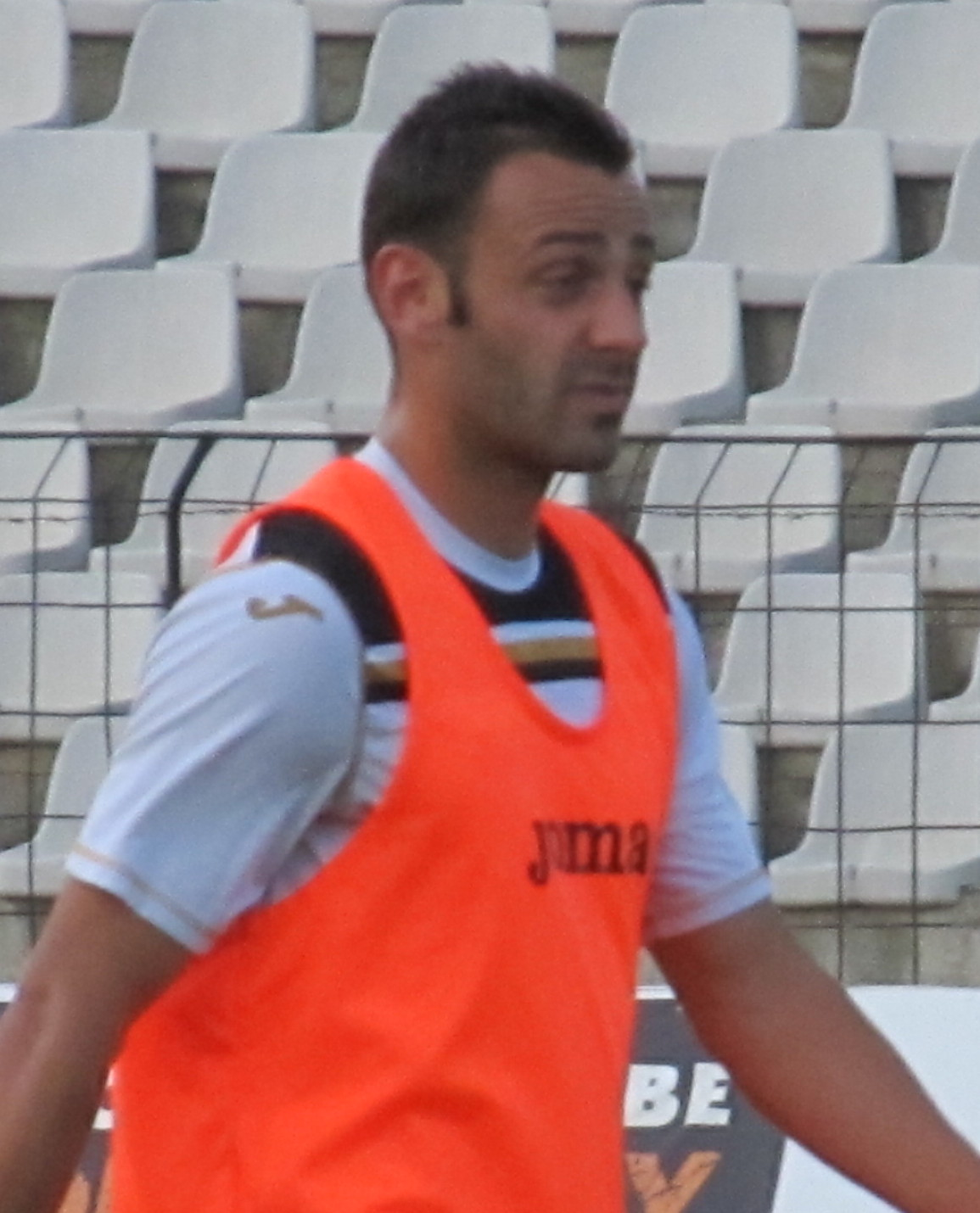

Personal information
- Full name: Borislav Yordanov Baldzhiyski
- Date of birth: 12 October 1990 (age 36)
- Place of birth: Ihtiman, Bulgaria
- Height: 1.81 m (5 ft 11 1/2 in)
- Positions: Attacking midfielder; forward

Team information
- Current team: Botev Ihtiman
- Number: 12

Youth career
- Levski Sofia

Senior career*
Years	Team	Apps	(Gls)
2009–2011	Levski Sofia	0	(0)
2010	→ Lokomotiv Mezdra (loan)	5	(0)
2010–2011	→ Nesebar (loan)	24	(6)
2011–2013	Chernomorets Burgas	30	(0)
2013	Slavia Sofia	3	(0)
2013–2014	Botev Ihtiman	17	(8)
2014	Lokomotiv Mezdra	15	(3)
2015	Montana	29	(7)
2016	Slavia Sofia	25	(7)
2017	Cherno More	18	(1)
2017–2018	Montana	23	(6)
2018	Dunav Ruse	18	(2)
2019	Tsarsko Selo	12	(0)
2019–2021	Montana	23	(5)
2021	KF Liria	0	(0)
2021–	Botev Ihtiman	89	(49)

International career
2011–2012	Bulgaria U21	8	(0)
- * Club domestic league appearances and goals as of 08:44, 15 June 2025 (UTC)

Borislav Baldzhiyski (Bulgarian: Борислав Балджийски; born 12 October 1990) is a Bulgarian footballer who plays as an attacking midfielder or forward for Bulgarian Third League club Botev Ihtiman.

== Career ==
=== Levski Sofia ===
Born in Ihtiman, Baldzhiyski joined the youth academy of Levski Sofia and represented the club at all youth levels. He finally signed a full contract on 14 October 2008, at the age of 18. On 10 September 2009 Baldzhiyski started training with the first team. On the next day, he signed his new contract with Levski, with a better salary, connected him with the team until 2013. Baldzhiyski made his first appearance in the first team in a 2–0 win against Brestnik 1948 in a match of the Bulgarian Cup on 9 December 2009.

On 11 January 2010, Borislav was sent to Lokomotiv Mezdra on loan for six months. On 9 June 2010 he returned to Levski. In January 2011, Borislav was sent to Nesebar on loan for six months.

=== Chernomorets Burgas ===
On 16 June 2011, Baldzhiyski was transferred to Chernomorets Burgas as a part of the deal for Orlin Starokin to Levski Sofia. He is released in late May 2013.

=== Cherno More ===
On 17 December 2016, Baldzhiyski signed with Cherno More for 1 1/2 years. He made his debut against CSKA Sofia in a 0–2 home defeat on 19 February. On 22 August 2017, Baldzhiyski's contract was terminated by mutual consent.

=== Montana ===
On 24 August 2017, Baldzhiyski returned to Montana, signing a two-year contract. However, he was released at the end of the 2017–18 season.

== Murder charges ==
Borislav Baldzhiyski was arrested for the murder of a 36-year-old man on August 6, 2013. If found guilty, he could be sentenced from 10 to 20 years in prison. In September 2016, the Sofia city court declared him guilty of the lesser charge of manslaughter due to carelessness, imposing a four-year prison sentence. On 4 July 2019 he was convicted guilty causing death by negligence, being conditionally sentenced to 2 years in prison with a maximum probation period of 5 years.

== Career statistics ==
As of 26 May 2018

Club	Season	League		Cup		Europe		Total	
Club	Season	Apps	Goals	Apps	Goals	Apps	Goals	Apps	Goals
Levski Sofia	2009–10	0	0	1	0	0	0	1	0
Levski Sofia	Total	0	0	1	0	0	0	1	0
Lokomotiv Mezdra	2009–10	5	0	0	0	—		5	0
Lokomotiv Mezdra	Total	5	0	0	0	0	0	5	0
Nesebar	2010–11	21	6	1	0	—		22	6
Nesebar	Total	21	6	1	0	0	0	22	6
Chernomorets Burgas	2011–12	21	0	2	1	—		23	1
Chernomorets Burgas	2012–13	9	0	0	0	—		9	0
Chernomorets Burgas	Total	30	0	2	1	0	0	32	1
Slavia Sofia	2013–14	3	0	0	0	—		3	0
Slavia Sofia	Total	3	0	0	0	0	0	3	0
Botev Ihtiman	2013–14	17	8	0	0	—		17	8
Botev Ihtiman	Total	17	8	0	0	0	0	17	8
Lokomotiv Mezdra	2014–15	15	3	1	0	—		16	3
Lokomotiv Mezdra	Total	15	3	1	0	0	0	16	3
Montana	2014–15	12	4	0	0	—		12	4
Montana	2015–16	17	3	3	0	—		20	3
Montana	Total	29	7	3	0	0	0	32	7
Slavia Sofia	2015–16	13	5	0	0	—		13	5
Slavia Sofia	2016–17	12	2	1	0	2	0	15	2
Slavia Sofia	Total	25	7	1	0	2	0	28	7
Cherno More	2016–17	16	1	1	0	—		17	1
Cherno More	2017–18	2	0	0	0	—		2	0
Cherno More	Total	18	1	1	0	0	0	19	1
Montana	2017–18	23	6	2	0	—		25	6
Montana	Total	23	6	2	0	0	0	25	6
Career total		186	38	12	1	2	0	200	39
