= Vojtěch Šrom =

Czech footballer

Personal information
- Date of birth: 3 May 1988 (age 38)
- Place of birth: Litovel, Czechoslovakia
- Height: 1.92 m (6 ft 4 in)
- Position: Goalkeeper

Team information
- Current team: Opava
- Number: 1

Youth career
- Sigma Olomouc

Senior career*
Years	Team	Apps	(Gls)
2008–2014	1. HFK Olomouc	79	(0)
2014–2016	Baník Ostrava	12	(0)
2016	→ Karviná (loan)	0	(0)
2017	Cherno More	5	(0)
2017–	Opava	45	(0)
- * Club domestic league appearances and goals as of 31 January 2021

Vojtěch Šrom (born 2 May 1988) is a Czech footballer who plays as a goalkeeper for SFC Opava.

== Career ==
A product of the youth academy of Sigma Olomouc, Šrom left the club at the age of 19 and joined 1. HFK Olomouc. He kept 12 clean sheets during 2011–12 season, helping the team gain promotion to the 2. liga.

In January 2014, Šrom joined Baník Ostrava. He made his Czech First League debut on 5 May 2014 against Sigma Olomouc as a first-half substitute, replacing Jiří Pavlenka in the 17th minute.

On 5 January 2017, Šrom signed a contract with Bulgarian First League club Cherno More Varna. He made his debut against CSKA Sofia in a 0–2 home defeat on 19 February. On 29 May 2017, his contract was terminated by mutual consent.

In June 2017, Šrom joined Opava.
