= Přemysl Kovář =

Czech footballer

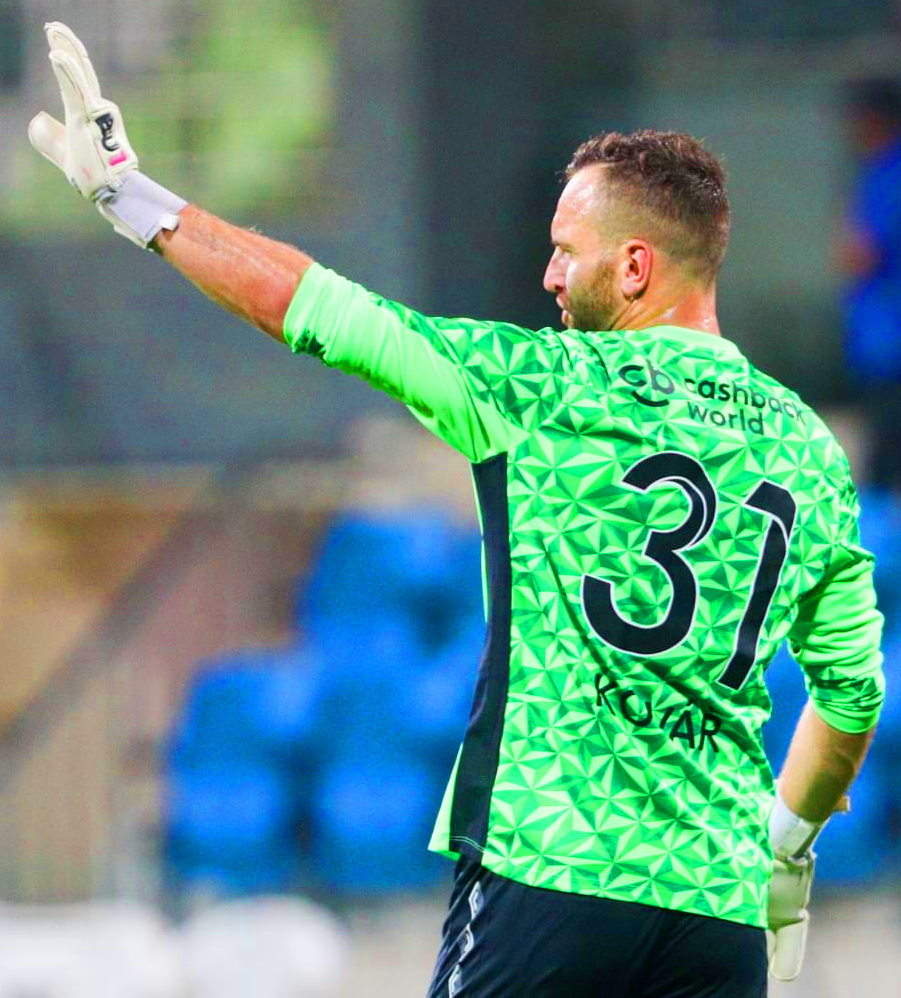

Personal information
- Full name: Přemysl Kovář
- Date of birth: 14 October 1985 (age 41)
- Place of birth: Boskovice, Czechoslovakia
- Height: 1.87 m (6 ft 1 1/2 in)
- Position: Goalkeeper

Senior career*
Years	Team	Apps	(Gls)
2003–2009	1. FC Slovácko	0	(0)
2006	→ FK Kunovice (loan)	?	(0)
2006–2007	→ Lamia (loan)	?	(0)
2009–2010	SK Hlavice	?	(0)
2010–2014	Slovan Liberec	34	(0)
2011	→ Ústí nad Labem (loan)	3	(0)
2011	→ Viktoria Žižkov (loan)	0	(0)
2012–2013	→ Varnsdorf (loan)	26	(0)
2014–2016	Hapoel Haifa	44	(0)
2016	Cherno More	12	(0)
2017–2022	Slavia Prague	8	(0)
- * Club domestic league appearances and goals as of 4 January 2023

Přemysl Kovář (born 14 October 1985) is a former Czech footballer who last played as a goalkeeper for Slavia Prague.

== Career ==
On 12 September 2016, Kovář joined Bulgarian club Cherno More Varna as free agent. In December 2016, he signed a 3-years contract with Slavia Prague.
