= Daniel Zlatkov =

Bulgarian footballer

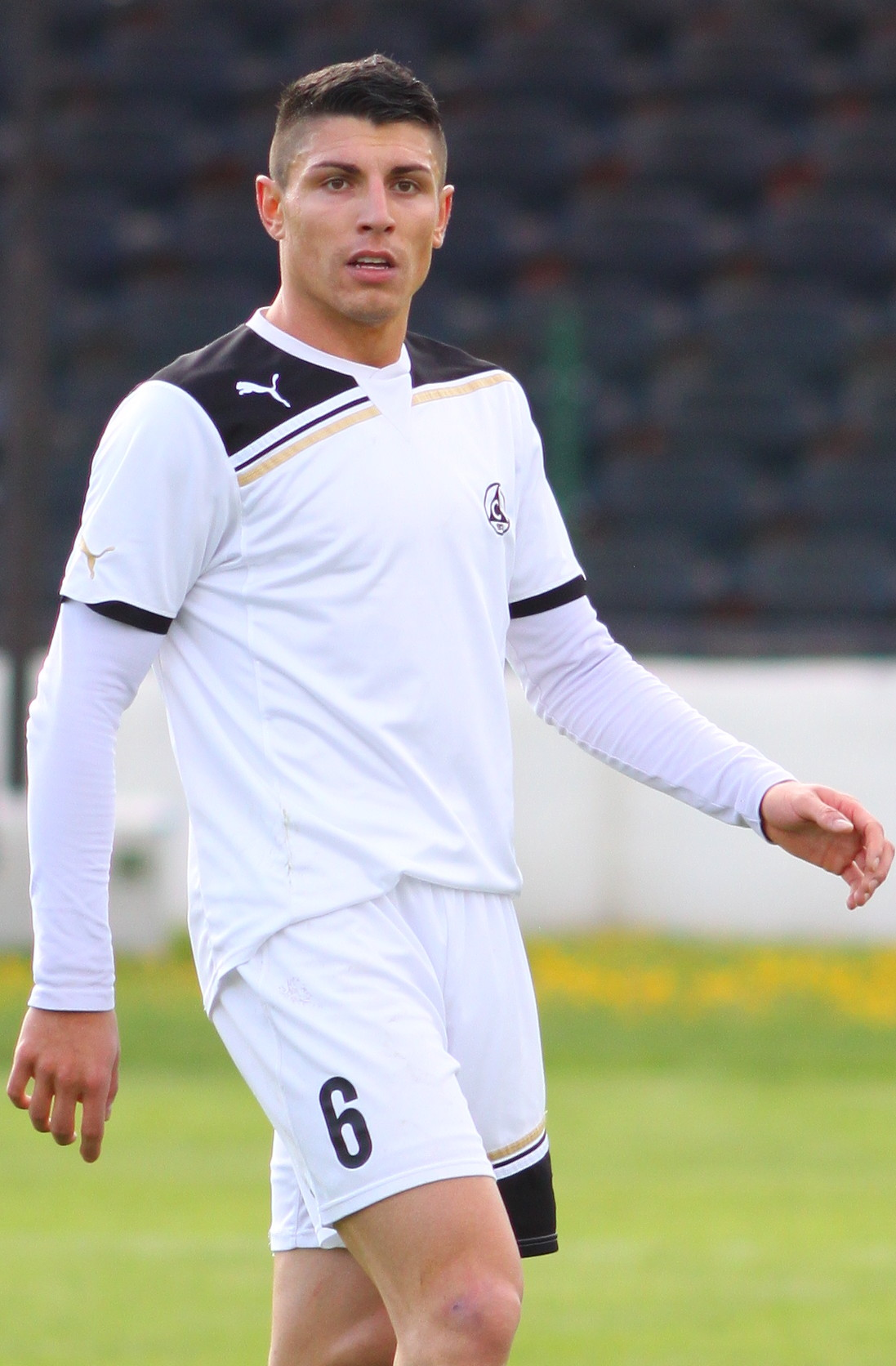
- Zlatkov playing for Slavia Sofia in 2012

Personal information
- Full name: Daniel Mariov Zlatkov
- Date of birth: 9 March 1989 (age 37)
- Place of birth: Blagoevgrad, Bulgaria
- Height: 1.89 m (6 ft 2 1/2 in)
- Position: Centre-back

Youth career
- 1998–2007: Pirin Blagoevgrad

Senior career*
Years	Team	Apps	(Gls)
2007–2009	Pirin Blagoevgrad	1	(0)
2008–2009	→ Pirin GD (loan)	24	(6)
2009–2011	Minyor Pernik	46	(3)
2011–2013	Slavia Sofia	49	(2)
2013–2014	Boluspor	28	(1)
2014–2016	Botev Plovdiv	33	(0)
2016	Cherno More	4	(0)
2016–2017	Botev Plovdiv	12	(0)
2017	Shakhtyor Soligorsk	3	(1)
2018–2021	Vihren Sandanski	47	(6)
2021–2022	Dobrudzha	7	(0)

International career
2009	Bulgaria U21		
- * Club domestic league appearances and goals as of 20 December 2021

Daniel Zlatkov (Bulgarian: Даниел Златков; born 6 March 1989) is a Bulgarian former footballer. He played for several years in the Bulgarian A PFG.

== Career ==
=== Early career ===
Zlatkov began playing football in his hometown Blagoevgrad at Pirin. In summer 2007, he started training with the first team and signed a professional contract, connecting him with the club until 2010. Zlatkov made his debut during the 2007–08 season on 10 May 2008 in a 2–2 away draw against Beroe. A few days later, he had a trial with Dynamo Kyiv, but did not do enough to secure a contract with the Ukrainian club. In June 2008, Zlatkov was sent to Pirin Gotse Delchev on loan for one year. In the 2008–09 season, he earned 27 appearances playing in the second division, scored seven goals and provided five assists.

=== Minyor ===
Because of his good displays, Zlatkov caught the eye of Minyor Pernik scouts. In May 2009, he signed a three-year contract with Minyor. On 17 January 2011 it was officially announced that he would spend 2 weeks trial with Maccabi Haifa. In August, he left the club.

=== Botev Plovdiv ===
Daniel Zlatkov signed a two-year contract with Botev Plovdiv on 25 August 2014.

Daniel did not participate in any competitive games until 10 March 2015 due to an injury. He made an official debut during the 0–2 away win in the derby game against Lokomotiv Plovdiv. Five days later, on 15 March, Zlatkov was again included in the starting lineup and he assisted for the first goal scored by Milen Gamakov and had a solid overall performance during the important 2–0 win over CSKA Sofia.

Daniel Zlatkov participated in 10 games in A Grupa during spring 2015 and because of his solid performance the fans of Botev Plovdiv selected him among the ten best players of the season.

Zlatkov's contract expired in the summer of 2016 and the manager Nikolay Kostov decided to release him. After that Zlatkov joined Cherno More Varna and he even played in a few games. In September 2016, a week after the dismissal of Nikolay Kostov, Zlatkov returned again to Botev Plovdiv. On 23 February 2017, his contract was terminated by mutual consent.

=== Shakhtyor Soligorsk ===
On 2 March 2017, Zlatkov signed a 2-year contract with Belarusian club Shakhtyor Soligorsk, for which he made just 3 appearances, scoring one goal.

=== Lokomotiv Sofia ===
After a brief stint as a MMA fighter, Daniel Zlatkov returned to football by joining Lokomotiv Sofia in February 2018, but the contract was not signed.

=== Dobrudzha Dobrich ===
In August 2021 Zlatkov joined Dobrudzha Dobrich.

== International career ==
In November 2016 Zlatkov received his first call-up to the senior Bulgaria squad for a match against Belarus, but remained on the bench.

== Personal life ==
Zlatkov has made an appearance in Azis's music video for the song "Mykonos".

In 2017 he entered in the 9th season of the Bulgarian VIP Brother. He was the seventh evicted in 10th place.
