= Metodi Kostov =

Bulgarian footballer

Personal information
- Full name: Metodi Nikolaev Kostov
- Date of birth: 4 April 1990 (age 36)
- Place of birth: Blagoevgrad, Bulgaria
- Height: 1.87 m (6 ft 1 1/2 in)
- Position: Forward

Youth career
- Pirin Blagoevgrad

Senior career*
Years	Team	Apps	(Gls)
2012–2013	Pirin Blagoevgrad	31	(18)
2013–2014	Minyor Pernik	25	(9)
2014–2015	Septemvri Simitli	42	(8)
2016	Vereya	22	(5)
2017–2018	Litex Lovech	27	(2)
2018–2019	Botev Galabovo	18	(8)
2019–2021	Vihren Sandanski	24	(20)
2021–2022	Minyor Pernik	43	(15)
2023–2026	Vihren Sandanski	78	(40)
- * Club domestic league appearances and goals as of 21 June 2026

Metodi Kostov (Bulgarian: Методи Костов; born 4 April 1990) is a Bulgarian former professional footballer who played as a forward.

== Career ==
=== Vereya ===
Kostov joined Vereya in the beginning of 2016. He made his First League debut on 30 July 2016 in a match against Dunav Ruse. He left the club in January 2017.

=== Litex ===
In January 2017, Kostov signed with Litex Lovech. His contract was terminated by mutual consent at the end of the 2017–18 season.

=== Botev Galabovo ===
On 12 July 2018, Kostov signed with Botev Galabovo.
