= Yordan Apostolov =

Bulgarian footballer

Personal information
- Full name: Yordan Dimitrov Apostolov
- Date of birth: 30 November 1989 (age 36)
- Place of birth: Sofia, Bulgaria
- Height: 1.85 m (6 ft 1 in)
- Position: Midfielder

Team information
- Current team: Balkan Botevgrad
- Number: 17

Senior career*
Years	Team	Apps	(Gls)
2007–2008	Sportist Svoge	5	(1)
2008–2009	Belasitsa Petrich	5	(0)
2009–2010	Balkan Botevgrad	17	(0)
2010–2011	Chavdar Byala Slatina	17	(1)
2011	Etar 1924	11	(2)
2012	Lokomotiv Mezdra	?	(?)
2012–2013	Dobrudzha Dobrich	25	(2)
2013	Marek Dupnitsa	5	(0)
2014	Botev Vratsa	10	(1)
2014–2016	Lokomotiv GO	46	(3)
2017	Etar Veliko Tarnovo	26	(1)
2018–2019	Botev Vratsa	36	(3)
2019	Etar Veliko Tarnovo	5	(0)
2019–2020	Hebar Pazardzhik	15	(0)
2020–2021	Sportist Svoge	7	(1)
2021–	Balkan Botevgrad	17	(1)
- * Club domestic league appearances and goals as of 10 November 2021

Yordan Apostolov (Bulgarian: Йордан Апостолов; born 30 November 1989) is a Bulgarian footballer, currently playing as a midfielder for Balkan Botevgrad.
