= Hristo Ivanov (footballer, born 1982) =

Bulgarian footballer

Personal information
- Full name: Hristo Stefanov Ivanov
- Date of birth: 6 April 1982 (age 44)
- Place of birth: Pleven, Bulgaria
- Height: 1.76 m (5 ft 9 1/2 in)
- Position: Goalkeeper

Senior career*
Years	Team	Apps	(Gls)
2000–2002	Spartak Pleven	57	(0)
2002–2009	Vidima-Rakovski	44	(0)
2009	Lokomotiv Mezdra	11	(0)
2010–2011	Montana	51	(0)
2012	Botev Plovdiv	16	(0)
2013–2016	Montana	104	(0)
2017	Oborishte	13	(0)
2017–2023	Etar Veliko Tarnovo	127	(0)

International career
2019	Bulgaria	1	(0)
- * Club domestic league appearances and goals

Hristo Ivanov (Bulgarian: Христо Иванов; born 6 April 1982) is a Bulgarian former professional footballer who played as a goalkeeper.

Ivanov previously played for Spartak Pleven, Vidima-Rakovski Sevlievo, Lokomotiv Mezdra, Botev Plovdiv, Montana and Oborishte.

== International career ==
In August 2019, Ivanov was called up by Krasimir Balakov to the Bulgaria national team for the Euro 2020 qualifier against England and friendly match against Republic of Ireland. An unused substitute against England, he made his debut against Ireland on 10 September 2019 at the Aviva Stadium, Dublin, making him, at 37 years, 5 months and 4 days, the oldest Bulgaria debutant.
