= Pirulo =

Spanish footballer (born 1992)

Personal information
- Full name: José Antonio Ruiz Lopéz
- Date of birth: 17 April 1992 (age 34)
- Place of birth: Los Barrios, Spain
- Height: 1.76 m (5 ft 9 1/2 in)
- Position: Attacking midfielder

Team information
- Current team: Persijap Jepara
- Number: 10

Youth career
- 2006–2007: Los Barrios
- 2007–2009: Cádiz
- 2009–2011: Espanyol

Senior career*
Years	Team	Apps	(Gls)
2011–2012	Espanyol B	33	(8)
2012–2013	Málaga B	27	(3)
2013–2014	Hospitalet	30	(6)
2014–2015	Espanyol B	30	(3)
2015–2016	Sabadell	25	(2)
2016	Senica	17	(4)
2017	Cherno More Varna	15	(1)
2017–2018	Los Barrios	26	(11)
2018–2019	Linense	30	(8)
2019–2025	ŁKS Łódź	172	(43)
2025–2026	St Joseph's	21	(3)
2026–	Persijap Jepara	9	(1)
- * Club domestic league appearances and goals as of 22:00, 7 November 2026 (UTC)

José Antonio Ruiz Lopéz (born 17 April 1992), commonly known as Pirulo, is a Spanish professional footballer who plays as an attacking midfielder for Super League club Persijap Jepara.

== Club career ==
=== Spain ===
Born in Los Barrios, Cádiz, Andalusia, Pirulo joined Espanyol's youth setup in January 2009, after refusing to train with his previous club, Cádiz. He made his senior debut for the former's reserves in 2011, in Tercera División.

On 8 July 2012 Pirulo signed for another reserve team, Atlético Malagueño also in the fourth tier. The following year he moved to Segunda División B club L'Hospitalet, scoring six goals in 30 appearances as his side missed out promotion in the play-offs.

On 30 June 2014, Pirulo returned to the Pericos and its B-team, now in the third division. On 14 July 2015, he joined fellow league team Sabadell.

=== Senica ===
In July 2016, Pirulo signed a contract with Fortuna Liga club Senica, after impressing on a trial basis. He made his professional debut on 16 July, starting in a 0–1 home loss against Slovan Bratislava.

=== Cherno More ===
On 6 February 2017, Pirulo joined Bulgarian club Cherno More. He made his debut against CSKA Sofia in a 0–2 home defeat on 19 February. On 19 March 2017, Pirulo scored his first and only goal in a 3–1 away win over Neftochimic Burgas. On 29 May 2017, his contract was terminated by mutual consent.

== Honours ==
ŁKS Łódź

- I liga: 2022–23

Individual

- I liga Player of the Year: 2022
- I liga Player of the Month: August 2022, February 2023
