= Hugo Seco =

Portuguese footballer

Personal information
- Full name: Hugo André Rodrigues Seco
- Date of birth: 17 June 1988 (age 38)
- Place of birth: Lousã, Portugal
- Height: 1.78 m (5 ft 10 in)
- Position: Winger

Team information
- Current team: Marialvas
- Number: 77

Youth career
- 1998–1999: Santa Clara Coimbra
- 1999–2001: Académico Gândaras
- 2001–2003: Académica
- 2003–2004: Vigor Mocidade
- 2004–2007: Académica

Senior career*
Years	Team	Apps	(Gls)
2007–2008	Anadia	8	(0)
2008–2009	Nelas	19	(0)
2009–2010	Académico Viseu	16	(1)
2010–2011	St. Lawrence Spurs		
2011–2012	Benfica Castelo Branco	14	(6)
2012–2013	Fátima	22	(3)
2013–2014	Benfica Castelo Branco	24	(1)
2014–2016	Académica	43	(1)
2016	Cherno More	18	(2)
2017–2018	Feirense	33	(1)
2018–2019	Irtysh	11	(1)
2019–2020	Kisvárda	27	(1)
2020–2021	Farense	26	(0)
2021–2024	Académica	69	(4)
2024–2025	União Coimbra	13	(0)
2025	União Lamas	8	(2)
2026–	Marialvas	1	(0)
- * Club domestic league appearances and goals as of 01:01, 12 January 2026 (UTC)

Hugo André Rodrigues Seco (born 17 June 1988) is a Portuguese professional footballer who plays as a winger for Campeonato de Portugal club Marialvas.

== Career ==
Born in Lousã, Coimbra District, Seco lived in Coimbra until he was 9, when he moved back with his family to his birthplace. He represented three clubs as a youth after starting out at futsal, finishing his development with Académica de Coimbra by signing at age 16. He spent his first seven seasons as a senior in lower league or amateur football, including two with Sport Benfica e Castelo Branco and one in the Maltese First Division with the St. Lawrence Spurs.

Seco returned to Académica on 4 July 2014, thus moving straight to the Primeira Liga. He made his debut in the competition on 10 January 2015, coming on as a 78th-minute substitute in a 2–2 home draw against F.C. Paços de Ferreira. He scored his first goal exactly one year later, closing the 2–1 win over C.D. Tondela also at the Estádio Cidade de Coimbra; it would be his only in 49 competitive appearances.

On 12 July 2016, after suffering top-flight relegation, Seco signed a one-year deal with PFC Cherno More Varna. On 31 January 2017, he left Bulgaria and returned to his homeland, joining C.D. Feirense.

Seco moved to FC Irtysh Pavlodar of the Kazakhstan Premier League on 23 July 2018, leaving the club the following January by mutual consent. and going on to spend parts of two seasons in the Hungarian Nemzeti Bajnokság I with Kisvárda FC.
