= 2018–19 FC Dunav Ruse season =

Dunav Ruse
2018–19 season
- Chairman: Simeon Simeonov
- Manager: Malin Orachev (until 17 September 2018); Lyudmil Kirov (since 1 October 2018)
- Bulgarian Cup: Second round
- Top goalscorer: League: Ahmed Ahmedov (8); All: Ahmed Ahmedov (8)
- Highest home attendance: 3,700 (vs. Levski Sofia, 11 August 2018)
- Lowest home attendance: 280 (vs. Slavia Sofia, 6 December 2018)
- Average home league attendance: 1,205
- Biggest win: 3–0 (vs. Vitosha Bistritsa, 3 November 2018)
- Biggest defeat: 1–4 (vs. Botev Plovdiv, 6 October 2018 vs. Lokomotiv Plovdiv, 9 March 2019)
Home colours	Away colours	Third colours
- All statistics correct as of 12 April 2019.

This page covers all relevant details regarding Dunav Ruse for all official competitions inside the 2018–19 season. These are the First Professional Football League and the Bulgarian Cup.

== Transfers ==
=== In ===
Date	Pos.	Name	From	Fee
7 June 2018	DF	(Bulgaria) Georgi Dinkov	Beroe	Free
7 June 2018	MF	(Bulgaria) Aleksandar Aleksandrov	Lokomotiv Sofia	Free
7 June 2018	MF	(Bulgaria) Borislav Baldzhiyski	Montana	Free
11 June 2018	MF	(Bulgaria) Ivan Kokonov	Montana	Free
18 June 2018	MF	(Bulgaria) Daniel Pehlivanov	Vihren	Free
18 June 2018	FW	(Bulgaria) Ahmed Ahmedov	Pomorie	Free
6 July 2018	GK	(Bulgaria) Filip Dimitrov	Tsarsko Selo	Free
11 July 2018	FW	(Brazil) Gláucio	(Brazil) Oeste	Free
7 August 2018	DF	(Brazil) Duda	(Brazil) Grêmio Anápolis	Free
15 August 2018	MF	(Ghana) Derrick Mensah	(Slovenia) NK Aluminij	Free
21 August 2018	MF	(France) Samy Ben Aicha	(France) Tarbes	Free
7 January 2019	DF	(Bulgaria) Iliya Munin	Vereya	Free
15 January 2019	DF	(Ghana) Samuel Inkoom	Free agent	Free
15 January 2019	MF	(Bulgaria) Svilen Shterev	Botev Galabovo	Free
15 January 2019	MF	(Bulgaria) Diyan Dimov	CSKA 1948	Free
16 January 2019	MF	(Romania) Dragoș Firțulescu	Beroe	Free
18 January 2019	DF	(North Macedonia) Aleksandar Isaevski	(North Macedonia) Pobeda	Free
4 February 2019	GK	(Bulgaria) Blagoy Makendzhiev	Cherno More	Free
4 February 2019	DF	(Australia) Kristopher Kioussis	(Australia) Port Melbourne	Free
14 February 2019	MF	(Bulgaria) Martin Stankev	Lokomotiv Sofia	Free

=== Out ===
Date	Pos.	Name	To	Fee
31 May 2018	MF	(Bulgaria) Yuliyan Nenov	Botev Vratsa	Free
5 June 2018	MF	(Bulgaria) Bircent Karagaren	Lokomotiv Plovdiv	Free
6 June 2018	MF	(Bulgaria) Vasil Shopov	Botev Plovdiv	Free
8 June 2018	DF	(Bulgaria) Mihail Milchev	Botev Vratsa	Free
10 June 2018	GK	(Bulgaria) Martin Lukov	Lokomotiv Plovdiv	Free
14 June 2018	DF	(Bulgaria) Ivaylo Markov	Cherno More	Free
15 June 2018	MF	(Brazil) Jatoba	(Portugal) Sporting CP	Free
15 June 2018	MF	(Bulgaria) Diyan Dimov	CSKA 1948	Free
18 June 2018	FW	(Bulgaria) Dimitar Georgiev	Montana	Free
1 July 2018	DF	(Bulgaria) Mario Petkov	Lokomotiv Sofia	Free
1 July 2018	GK	(Bulgaria) Veselin Dobrev	Chernomorets Balchik	Free
10 July 2018	MF	(Bulgaria) Stefan Mitev	Oborishte	Free
3 August 2018	MF	(Algeria) Nassim Zitouni	(Algeria) CS Constantine	Free
8 August 2018	MF	(Brazil) Esquerdinha		Free
20 August 2018	MF	(Bulgaria) Hristo Lemperov		Free
29 October 2018	FW	(Brazil) Gláucio	(Armenia) Alashkert	Free
30 October 2018	DF	(Brazil) Duda	(Brazil) Maringá	Free
30 October 2018	MF	(France) Samy Ben Aicha		Free
10 December 2018	MF	(Bulgaria) Aleksandar Aleksandrov	Lokomotiv Sofia	Free
17 December 2018	MF	(Ghana) Derrick Mensah		Free
21 December 2018	MF	(Bulgaria) Daniel Pehlivanov	Hebar	Free
8 January 2019	MF	(Bulgaria) Branimir Kostadinov		Free
9 January 2019	DF	(Bulgaria) Preslav Petrov	Slavia Sofia	Free
15 January 2019	MF	(Bulgaria) Borislav Baldzhiyski	Tsarsko Selo	Free
15 January 2019	MF	(Bulgaria) Ivan Kokonov	Arda	Free

=== Loans in ===
Date	Pos.	Name	From	End date	Fee
3 September 2018	MF	(Bulgaria) Svetoslav Kovachev	Ludogorets	30 June 2019	Free
15 January 2019	DF	(Bulgaria) Emin Ahmed	Beroe	30 June 2019	Free

=== Loans out ===
Date	Pos.	Name	To	End date	Fee
4 February 2019	DF	(Australia) Kristopher Kioussis	Pirin Blagoevgrad	30 June 2019	Free
7 February 2019	GK	(Bulgaria) Filip Dimitrov	Pirin Blagoevgrad	30 June 2019	Free

== Current squad ==
As of 9 March 2019

Note: Flags indicate national team as defined under FIFA eligibility rules; some limited exceptions apply. Players may hold more than one non-FIFA nationality.

No.	Pos.	Nation	Player
1	GK	BUL	Borislav Nachev
2	DF	GHA	Samuel Inkoom
4	DF	BUL	Petar Patev
5	DF	BUL	Georgi Dinkov
7	MF	BUL	Martin Stankev
8	MF	BUL	Svilen Shterev
9	FW	BUL	Ahmed Ahmedov
10	MF	ROU	Dragoș Firțulescu
11	MF	BUL	Diyan Dimov
14	MF	BUL	Bozhidar Vasev
16	DF	BUL	Martin Kovachev (captain)

No.	Pos.	Nation	Player
19	MF	BUL	Kristiyan Varbanov
21	GK	BUL	Blagoy Makendzhiev
22	FW	BUL	Ismail Isa
23	DF	BUL	Iliya Munin
24	DF	MKD	Aleksandar Isaevski
27	FW	SEN	Mouhamadou N'Diaye
31	MF	BUL	Krasimir Stanoev
77	DF	BUL	Emin Ahmed (on loan from Beroe)
83	DF	BUL	Hristo Popadiyn
86	GK	BUL	Stanislav Antonov
98	MF	BUL	Svetoslav Kovachev (on loan from Ludogorets)

=== Foreign players ===
EU Nationals

- (Romania) Dragoș Firțulescu

EU Nationals (Dual citizenship)

Non-EU Nationals

- (Ghana) Samuel Inkoom
- (North Macedonia) (United States) Aleksandar Isaevski
- (Senegal) Mouhamadou N'Diaye

== Squad statistics ==
As of match played 9 March 2019

No.	Pos	Nat	Player	Total		Parva Liga		Bulgarian Cup	
No.	Pos	Nat	Player	Apps	Goals	Apps	Goals	Apps	Goals
1	GK	(Bulgaria) BUL	Borislav Nachev	0	0	0	0	0	0
2	DF	(Ghana) GHA	Samuel Inkoom	10	0	8	0	2	0
4	DF	(Bulgaria) BUL	Petar Patev	27	0	23+4	0	0	0
5	DF	(Bulgaria) BUL	Georgi Dinkov	30	1	29	1	1	0
7	MF	(Bulgaria) BUL	Martin Stankev	4	0	1+3	0	0	0
8	MF	(Bulgaria) BUL	Svilen Shterev	4	0	3+1	0	0	0
9	FW	(Bulgaria) BUL	Ahmed Ahmedov	27	8	18+7	8	1+1	0
10	MF	(Romania) ROU	Dragoș Firțulescu	5	0	2+3	0	0	0
11	MF	(Bulgaria) BUL	Diyan Dimov	5	0	4+1	0	0	0
14	MF	(Bulgaria) BUL	Bozhidar Vasev	21	3	21	3	0	0
16	DF	(Bulgaria) BUL	Martin Kovachev	31	2	29	2	2	0
19	MF	(Bulgaria) BUL	Kristiyan Varbanov	2	0	1	0	0+1	0
21	GK	(Bulgaria) BUL	Blagoy Makendzhiev	13	0	11	0	2	0
22	FW	(Bulgaria) BUL	Ismail Isa	15	2	14	2	1	0
23	DF	(Bulgaria) BUL	Iliya Munin	6	1	4	1	2	0
24	DF	(North Macedonia) MKD	Aleksandar Isaevski	11	0	8+1	0	2	0
27	FW	(Senegal) SEN	Mouhamadou N'Diaye	21	0	8+11	0	1+1	0
31	MF	(Bulgaria) BUL	Krasimir Stanoev	26	3	22+2	2	2	1
77	DF	(Bulgaria) BUL	Emin Ahmed	3	0	3	0	0	0
83	DF	(Bulgaria) BUL	Hristo Popadiyn	27	0	24+1	0	1+1	0
86	GK	(Bulgaria) BUL	Stanislav Antonov	14	0	13	0	1	0
98	MF	(Bulgaria) BUL	Svetoslav Kovachev	23	2	20+1	2	1+1	0

== Competitions ==
=== Overall ===
==== Competition record ====
Competition	Started round	Current position/round	Final position/round	First match	Last match	Record							
Competition	Started round	Current position/round	Final position/round	First match	Last match	P	W	D	L	GF	GA	GD	Win %
First League	—	—	11th	20 July 2018	22 May 2019	36	9	9	18	40	58	−18	25.00
Bulgarian Cup	First round	—	Second round	26 September 2018	30 October 2018	2	0	1	1	2	3	−1	0.00
Total						38	9	10	19	42	61	−19	23.68

Updated to match played 22 May 2019
Source: Competitions

=== Friendlies ===
==== Pre-season ====
23 June 2018 Friendly	Dunav Ruse	1–1	Etar	Tryavna
18:30 EEST	Baldzhiyski 44'	Report	Ivaylov 7'	Stadium: Angel Kanchev Stadium

27 June 2018 Friendly	Dunav Ruse	4–1	Botev Galabovo	Maglizh
18:00 EEST	Ahmedov 10'; Kokonov 16'; Kostadinov 18', 90'	Report		Stadium: Maglizh Stadium

30 June 2018 Friendly	Dunav Ruse	2–2	Vitosha Bistritsa	Sevlievo
18:00 EEST	Baldzhiyski 14'; Ahmedov 70'	Report	Kotev 23', 54'	Stadium: Rakovski Stadium

7 July 2018 Friendly	Dunav Ruse	3–2	Chernomorets Balchik	Targovishte
18:00 EEST	Kostadinov 14'; Patev 52'; S. Kovachev 90+2'	Report	Lugo 60'; Palankov 85'	Stadium: Dimitar Burkov Stadium

13 July 2018 Friendly	Dunav Ruse	0–0	Lokomotiv Gorna Oryahovitsa	Ruse
18:00 EEST		Report		Stadium: Gradski Stadium

==== Mid-season ====
7 September 2018 Friendly	Dunav Ruse	3–4	Lokomotiv Gorna Oryahovitsa	Gorna Oryahovitsa
17:30 EEST	Aleksandrov 9'; Kokonov 48'; Pehlivanov 52'	Report	Todorov 2', 60'; Kolev 58'; Velkov 81'	Stadium: Lokomotiv Stadium

12 October 2018 Friendly	Dunav Ruse (Bulgaria)	0–2	(Romania) Astra Giurgiu	Giurgiu, Romania
16:30 EET		Report	Llullaku 25', 80'	Stadium: Marin Anastasovici

23 March 2019 Friendly	Dunav Ruse (Bulgaria)	0–0	(Romania) Astra Giurgiu	Giurgiu, Romania
11:30 EET		Report		Stadium: Marin Anastasovici

==== Winter ====
17 January 2019 Friendly	Dunav Ruse	2–0	Botev Vratsa	Vratsa
14:00 EET	N'Diaye 35'; Shterev 39'	Report		Stadium: Hristo Botev Stadium

22 January 2019 Friendly	Dunav Ruse (Bulgaria)	1–4	(Kazakhstan) Zhetysu	Antalya, Turkey
17:00 EET	Vasev 46' (pen.)	Report	Zhaksylykov 32', 77' (pen.); Lebedzew 37'; Stepanyuk 69'	Stadium: SENTIDO Zeynep Golf Resort Otel

31 January 2019 Friendly	Dunav Ruse (Bulgaria)	0–1	(Romania) Sepsi OSK	Antalya, Turkey
14:00 EET		Report	Tandia 9'	Stadium: SENTIDO Zeynep Golf Resort Otel

28 January 2019 Friendly	Dunav Ruse (Bulgaria)	1–0	(Russia) Shinnik	Antalya, Turkey
14:00 EET	Ahmedov 23'	Report		Stadium: SENTIDO Zeynep Golf Resort Otel

31 January 2019 Friendly	Dunav Ruse (Bulgaria)	0–0	(Russia) Khimki	Antalya, Turkey
14:00 EET		Report		Stadium: SENTIDO Zeynep Golf Resort Otel

6 February 2019 Friendly	Dunav Ruse	0–2	Cherno More	Varna
14:30 EET		Report	N'Dongala 54'; Iliev 87'	Stadium: Ticha Stadium

9 February 2019 Friendly	Dunav Ruse	2–0	Litex Lovech	Lovech
14:30 EET	N'Diaye 19'; Ahmedov 31'	Report		Stadium: Lovech Stadium

=== First Professional League ===
==== Regular season ====
===== Matches =====
20 July 2018 1	Vitosha Bistritsa	2–1	Dunav Ruse	Bistritsa
21:45 EEST	Tsankov (yellow card) 21' (yellow-red card) 90+4'; Milev 62' (pen.); Hristov 64'; Renja (yellow card) 88' (yellow-red card) 90+4'	Report	Ahmedov 4'; Stanoev (red card) 90+4'	Stadium: Bistritsa Stadium; Attendance: 220; Referee: Ivaylo Stoyanov (Petrich)

27 July 2018 2	Dunav Ruse	3–1	Botev Vratsa	Ruse
21:45 EEST	Ahmedov 27'; Vasev 31' (pen.); S. Kovachev (yellow card) 44'; M. Kovachev (yellow card) 60'; Baldzhiyski 63'; Gláucio (yellow card) 87'	Report	Milchev (yellow card) 45'; Atanasov 56'	Stadium: Gradski Stadium; Attendance: 900; Referee: Stanislav Todorov (Shumen)

5 August 2018 3	CSKA Sofia	3–0	Dunav Ruse	Sofia
20:45 EEST	Maurides 39'; M. Kovachev 45+2' (o.g.); Despodov 56'; Chorbadzhiyski (yellow card) 84'	Report		Stadium: Balgarska Armia Stadium; Attendance: 2,600; Referee: Vladimir Valkov (Plovdiv)

11 August 2018 4	Dunav Ruse	1–2	Levski Sofia	Ruse
21:00 EEST	Vasev 53' (pen.); Patev (yellow card) 62'; Ahmedov (yellow card) 86'	Report	Naydenov (yellow card) 33'; Belaïd (yellow card) 52'; Cabral 59' (yellow card) 63'; Gómez (yellow card) 72'; Eyjólfsson 78'; Thiam (yellow card) 90+1'	Stadium: Gradski Stadium; Attendance: 3,700; Referee: Stanislav Stavrov (Veliko Tarnovo)

17 August 2018 5	Slavia Sofia	2–0	Dunav Ruse	Sofia
18:30 EEST	G. Ivanov 63'; Shokolarov 67'; Petkov (yellow card) 85'	Report	S. Kovachev (yellow card) 24'; M. Kovachev (yellow card) 36'; N'Diaye (yellow card) 61'; Vasev (yellow card) 62'	Stadium: Vasil Levski National Stadium; Attendance: 80; Referee: Valentin Zhelezov (Burgas)

24 August 2018 6	Dunav Ruse	2–0	Septemvri Sofia	Ruse
18:45 EEST	M. Kovachev 69'; Ahmedov 75'; Patev (yellow card) 77'; Baldzhiyski (yellow card) 88'	Report	I. Stoyanov (yellow card) 36' (yellow-red card) 57'; Fabiano (yellow card) 45+3'; Diaby (yellow card) 74'; Benga (yellow card) 87'	Stadium: Gradski Stadium; Attendance: 1,000; Referee: Georgi Kabakov (Plovdiv)

2 September 2018 7	Ludogorets Razgrad	3–1	Dunav Ruse	Razgrad
21:00 EEST	Lukoki 26'; Keșerü 51', 53'	Report	Kokonov 76'	Stadium: Ludogorets Arena; Attendance: 1,100; Referee: Dragomir Draganov (Plovdiv)

15 September 2018 8	Dunav Ruse	2–4	Etar	Ruse
14:45 EEST	Stanoev 45+1'; Dinkov 49'	Report	Mladenov 10'; Batrović 14'; Rumenov 20' (yellow card) 62'; Artjunin (yellow card) 45'; Vasilev (yellow card) 68'; Sarmov 71' (pen.)	Stadium: Gradski Stadium; Attendance: 1,200; Referee: Ivaylo Stoyanov (Petrich)

23 September 2018 9	Vereya	1–1	Dunav Ruse	Stara Zagora
15:00 EET	Vušurović 11'	Report	M. Kovachev 86'	Stadium: Trace Arena; Attendance: 240; Referee: Stanimir Trenchev (Sofia)

30 September 2018 10	Dunav Ruse	1–1	Beroe	Ruse
15:00 EET	M. Kovachev (yellow card) 28'; Ahmedov 48'; Patev (yellow card) 66'; Baldzhiyski (yellow card) 75'	Report	Angelov (yellow card) 8'; Mesca (yellow card) 28'; Kamburov 40'; Tsvetkov (yellow card) 57'; Wanderson (yellow card) 78'	Stadium: Gradski Stadium; Attendance: 1,100; Referee: Georgi Kabakov (Plovdiv)

6 October 2018 11	Botev Plovdiv	4–1	Dunav Ruse	Plovdiv
15:00 EET	Petkov 29'; Patev 35' (o.g.); Vutov (yellow card) 53'; K. Dimitrov 70'; Terziev (yellow card) 77'; Baltanov 79'; Gustavo (yellow card) 84'	Report	Ahmedov 17'; Dinkov (yellow card) 48'; Patev (yellow card) 61'; Popadiyn (yellow card) 71'	Stadium: Botev 1912 Football Complex; Attendance: 2,000; Referee: Stefan Apostolov (Simitli)

21 October 2018 12	Dunav Ruse	1–0	Lokomotiv Plovdiv	Ruse
17:30 EET	M. Kovachev (yellow card) 39'; Stanoev (yellow card) 43' (goal) 67' (pen.); Kostadinov (yellow card) 53'; Pehlivanov (yellow card) 87'	Report	Eze (yellow card) 27'; Aralica (yellow card) 32'; Petrović (yellow card) 52'; Tomašević (yellow card) 59'	Stadium: Gradski Stadium; Attendance: 1,500; Referee: Valentin Zhelezov (Burgas)

26 October 2018 13	Cherno More	3–2	Dunav Ruse	Varna
17:30 EET	Iliev 9', 82'; Enchev 32'; Konongo (yellow card) 59'; Panayotov (yellow card) 88'	Report	Hassani 2' (o.g.); A. Aleksandrov (yellow card) 67'; Petrov (yellow card) 76'; Isa 78'; Popadiyn (yellow card) 85'; M. Kovachev (yellow card) 90'	Stadium: Ticha Stadium; Attendance: 700; Referee: Petar Kirilov (Dobrich)

3 November 2018 14	Dunav Ruse	3–0	Vitosha Bistritsa	Ruse
12:30 EET	Ahmedov 6', 23'; S. Kovachev 15' (yellow card) 17'; Popadiyn (yellow card) 69'; Petrov (yellow card) 71'	Report	Gochev (yellow card) 17'; Lazarov (yellow card) 45'; Hristov (yellow card) 50'	Stadium: Gradski Stadium; Attendance: 950; Referee: Volen Chinkov (Sofia)

11 November 2018 15	Botev Vratsa	1–0	Dunav Ruse	Vratsa
12:15 EET	A. Vasev (yellow card) 38'; Domovchiyski 49'; Gadzhev (yellow card) 54'; Milanov (yellow card) 78'; Apostolov (yellow card) 90'	Report	B. Vasev (yellow card) 22'; M. Kovachev (yellow card) 33'; Dinkov (yellow card) 90+4'	Stadium: Hristo Botev Stadium; Attendance: 5,200; Referee: Stefan Apostolov (Simitli)

24 November 2018 16	Dunav Ruse	0–2	CSKA Sofia	Ruse
15:00 EET	Popadiyn (yellow card) 39'	Report	Maurides 40'; Gyasi 47'	Stadium: Gradski Stadium; Attendance: 2,000; Referee: Stanislav Todorov (Shumen)

1 December 2018 17	Levski Sofia	3–0	Dunav Ruse	Sofia
17:30 EET	Cabral 21', 28' (pen.); Kostov 38'; Jablonský (yellow card) 68'	Report	M. Kovachev (yellow card) 27'	Stadium: Vivacom Arena - Georgi Asparuhov Stadium; Attendance: 850; Referee: Dragomir Draganov (Plovdiv)

6 December 2018 18	Dunav Ruse	1–1	Slavia Sofia	Ruse
15:00 EET	S. Kovachev (yellow card) 26'; Ahmedov (yellow card) 27' (goal) 42'; Vasev (yellow card) 36'; Patev (yellow card) 60'; M. Kovachev (yellow card) 70'	Report	Marem (yellow card) 25'; G. Ivanov (yellow card) 60'; Uzunov 90+1'	Stadium: Gradski Stadium; Attendance: 280; Referee: Georgi Davidov (Veliko Tarnovo)

9 December 2018 19	Septemvri Sofia	2–1	Dunav Ruse	Sofia
12:30 EET	Nikolov (yellow card) 3' (goal) 50'; Meledje (yellow card) 38'; Gadi 72'; Georgiev (yellow card) 90+4'	Report	Baldzhiyski 17'; M. Kovachev (yellow card) 23'; Ahmedov (yellow card) 30'; Kostadinov (yellow card) 34'; S. Kovachev (yellow card) 70'; Vasev (yellow card) 84' (yellow-red card) 84'	Stadium: Vasil Levski National Stadium; Attendance: 30; Referee: Radoslav Gidzhenov (Plovdiv)

16 December 2018 20	Dunav Ruse	0–2	Ludogorets Razgrad	Ruse
12:30 EET	Ahmedov (yellow card) 52'; Stanoev (yellow card) 53'; Patev (yellow card) 80'	Report	Świerczok 16'; Góralski (yellow card) 52'; Keșerü 82'	Stadium: Gradski Stadium; Attendance: 480; Referee: Nikola Popov (Sofia)

17 February 2019 21	Etar	3–0	Dunav Ruse	Veliko Tarnovo
12:30 EET	Bojaj 47'; Mladenov 69'; Angelov 82'	Report	Popadiyn (yellow card) 64'	Stadium: Ivaylo Stadium; Attendance: 1,200; Referee: Stanislav Todorov (Shumen)

20 February 2019 22	Dunav Ruse	1–0	Vereya	Ruse
12:15 EET	Stanoev (yellow card) 22'; S. Kovachev 57'	Report	Ntoya (yellow card) 12'; Kouroupis (yellow card) 19'; D. Ivanov (yellow card) 23'	Stadium: Gradski Stadium; Attendance: 650; Referee: Vladimir Valkov (Plovdiv)

24 February 2019 23	Beroe	1–0	Dunav Ruse	Stara Zagora
18:00 EET	Dinkov 13' (o.g.); Tsvetkov (yellow card) 45'; Mesca (yellow card) 73'	Report	Vasev (yellow card) 29'	Stadium: Beroe Stadium; Attendance: 260; Referee: Nikolay Yordanov (Sofia)

2 March 2019 24	Dunav Ruse	1–1	Botev Plovdiv	Ruse
12:30 EET	Vasev 43'; E. Ahmed (yellow card) 53'	Report	Terziev (yellow card) 26'; Nedelev 54' (pen.); Ebert (yellow card) 57'; Zehirov (yellow card) 58'; S. Shopov (yellow card) 89'	Stadium: Gradski Stadium; Attendance: 700; Referee: Ivaylo Stoyanov (Petrich)

9 March 2019 25	Lokomotiv Plovdiv	4–1	Dunav Ruse	Plovdiv
15:00 EET	D. Iliev 24', 45+2'; Bahtić 34'; Banović 90+2'	Report	Dinkov (yellow card) 14'; Shterev (yellow card) 18'; Isa 30'; E. Ahmed (yellow card) 45+1'; Isaevski (yellow card) 65'; Dimov (yellow card) 87'; Stanoev (yellow card) 90'	Stadium: Lokomotiv Stadium; Attendance: 550; Referee: Volen Chinkov (Sofia)

17 March 2019 26	Dunav Ruse	1–1	Cherno More	Ruse
15:00 EET	Vasev 20' (pen.); M. Kovachev (yellow card) 27'; S. Kovachev (yellow card) 49'; Isaevski (yellow card) 77'; Inkoom (yellow card) 90+3'	Report	Iliev 28' (pen.) (yellow card) 35'	Stadium: Gradski Stadium; Attendance: 1,000; Referee: Petar Kirilov (Dobrich)

===== Results summary =====
Overall								Home						Away					
Pld	W	D	L	GF	GA	GD	Pts	W	D	L	GF	GA	GD	W	D	L	GF	GA	GD
26	5	5	16	25	47	−22	20	5	4	4	17	15	+2	0	1	12	8	32	−24

Last updated: 15 March 2019.
Source: bulgarian-football.com

===== League performance =====
Round	1	2	3	4	5	6	7	8	9	10	11	12	13	14	15	16	17	18	19	20	21	22	23	24	25	26
Ground	A	H	A	H	A	H	A	H	A	H	A	H	A	H	A	H	A	H	A	H	A	H	A	H	A	H
Result	L	W	L	L	L	W	L	L	D	D	L	W	L	W	L	L	L	D	L	L	L	W	L	D	L	D
Position	11	9	10	12	13	10	12	12	12	12	12	12	12	11	11	12	12	12	12	12	13	13	13	13	13	13

Source: bulgarian-football.com
A = Away; H = Home; W = Win; D = Draw; L = Loss

===== League table =====
Pos	Team	Pld	W	D	L	GF	GA	GD	Pts	Qualification
10	Botev Vratsa	26	9	4	13	29	40	−11	31	Qualification for the Relegation round
11	Vitosha Bistritsa	26	7	4	15	17	39	−22	25	Qualification for the Relegation round
12	Septemvri Sofia	26	6	3	17	23	52	−29	21	Qualification for the Relegation round
13	Dunav Ruse	26	5	5	16	25	47	−22	20	Qualification for the Relegation round
14	Vereya	26	0	6	20	12	60	−48	6	Qualification for the Relegation round

Source: Soccerway
Rules for classification: 1) Points; 2) Head-to-head points; 3) Head-to-head goal difference; 4) Head-to-head goals scored; 5) Head-to-head away goals scored (only if two teams); 6) Goal difference; 7) Goals scored; 8) Fairplay ranking; 9) Draw.

==== Relegation stage ====
===== Matches =====
29 March 2019 27	Lokomotiv Plovdiv	1–1	Dunav Ruse	Plovdiv
20:00 EET	Ožbolt 28'; Banović (yellow card) 38'; Eze (yellow card) 47'; Tsvetanov (yellow card) 80'	Report	Popadiyn (yellow card) 4'; Isa 45+2'; Dimov (yellow card) 63'	Stadium: Lokomotiv Stadium; Attendance: 440; Referee: Nikolay Yordanov (Sofia)

8 April 2019 28	Dunav Ruse	2–2	Septemvri Sofia	Ruse
17:30 EET	Popadiyn (yellow card) 26' (yellow-red card) 30'; S. Kovachev 33'; Isa 38' (yellow card) 63'; Patev (yellow card) 56'	Report	Mandiangu 5'; Sahiti (yellow card) 32'; Nikolov 50'; I. Stoyanov (yellow card) 68'	Stadium: Gradski Stadium; Attendance: 800; Referee: Stanislav Todorov (Shumen)

12 April 2019 29	Slavia Sofia	3–5	Dunav Ruse	Sofia
17:15 EET	Kirilov 41', 90+1'; Shokolarov (yellow card) 45'; Chunchukov 51' (pen.); Bollo (yellow card) 85'	Report	Isa 12'; Munin 24'; Stanoev (yellow card) 31'; S. Kovachev 44', 54'; Firțulescu 61'	Stadium: Slavia Stadium; Attendance: 140; Referee: Georgi Kabakov (Plovdiv)

19 April 2019 30	Dunav Ruse	2–0	Lokomotiv Plovdiv	Ruse
17:30 EET	Firțulescu 3' (pen.), 40'; S. Kovachev (yellow card) 14'; Shterev (yellow card) 21'; Dimov (yellow card) 54'	Report	Masoero (red card) 2'	Stadium: Gradski Stadium; Attendance: 400; Referee: Georgi Davidov (Veliko Tarnovo)

26 April 2019 31	Septemvri Sofia	1–1	Dunav Ruse	Sofia
16:00 EET	M. Kovachev 5' (o.g.); Z. Dimitrov (yellow card) 17'; G. Stoichkov (yellow card) 33'; Benga (yellow card) 86'	Report	A. Dyulgerov 9' (o.g.); Firțulescu (yellow card) 41'; S. Kovachev (yellow card) 79'	Stadium: Vasil Levski National Stadium; Attendance: 80; Referee: Stanislav Todorov (Shumen)

3 May 2019 32	Dunav Ruse	0–1	Slavia Sofia	Ruse
17:30 EET	Isa (yellow card) 63'; E. Ahmed (yellow card) 87'	Report	Chunchukov 89'	Stadium: Gradski Stadium; Attendance: 600; Referee: Nikola Popov (Sofia)

===== Relegation play-offs =====
8 May 2019 Round 1 1st leg	Dunav Ruse	0–0	Vitosha Bistritsa	Ruse
19:30 EET	Stanoev (yellow card) 64'	Report	Tsankov (yellow card) 74' (yellow-red card) 80'; Valchanov (yellow card) 78'; Vasilev (yellow card) 90+2'	Stadium: Gradski Stadium; Attendance: 1,200; Referee: Dragomir Draganov (Varna)

13 May 2019 Round 1 2nd leg	Vitosha Bistritsa	0–1 (0–1 agg.)	Dunav Ruse	Bistritsa
20:00 EET	Kotev (yellow card) 74'; Bonev (yellow card) 90+2'	Report	Isa 16'; Popadiyn (yellow card) 20'; S. Kovachev (yellow card) 77' (red card) 90+2'	Stadium: Bistritsa Stadium; Attendance: 340; Referee: Nedelcho Gadzhalov (Plovdiv)

19 May 2019 Round 2 1st leg	Dunav Ruse	0–1	Septemvri Sofia	Ruse
20:00 EET	Isaevski (yellow card) 16'	Report	Mandiangu (yellow card) 32' (goal) 65'	Stadium: Gradski Stadium; Attendance: 1,800; Referee: Vladimir Valkov (Plovdiv)

22 May 2019 Round 2 2nd leg	Septemvri Sofia	2–3 (3–3(a.) agg.)	Dunav Ruse	Sofia
20:00 EET	Dimitrov 5'; Galchev 67'	Report	M. Kovachev (yellow card) 9'; Isa 41'; Shterev 44', 73' (red card) 81'; Patev (yellow card) 52'; Stanoev (yellow card) 78'	Stadium: Vasil Levski National Stadium; Attendance: 120; Referee: Nikolay Yordanov (Sofia)

===== Results summary =====
Overall								Home						Away					
Pld	W	D	L	GF	GA	GD	Pts	W	D	L	GF	GA	GD	W	D	L	GF	GA	GD
6	2	3	1	11	8	+3	9	1	1	1	4	3	+1	1	2	0	7	5	+2

Last updated: 3 May 2019.
Source: bulgarian-football.com

===== League performance =====
Round	1	2	3	4	5	6
Ground	A	H	A	H	A	H
Result	D	D	W	W	D	L
Position	4	4	4	4	4	4

Updated to match(es) played on 3 May 2019. Source: bulgarian-football.com
A = Away; H = Home; W = Win; D = Draw; L = Loss

===== League table =====
Pos	Team	Pld	W	D	L	GF	GA	GD	Pts	Qualification or relegation	SLA	LPL	SEP	DUN
1	Slavia Sofia	32	10	9	13	37	42	−5	39	Qualification for the European play-off quarter-finals	—	2–2	0–0	3–5
2	Lokomotiv Plovdiv	32	10	8	14	37	37	0	38	Qualification for the Europa League second qualifying round (Note: Lokomotiv Plovdiv qualified for the Europa League second qualifying round by winning the 2018–19 Bulgarian Cup.)	1–1	—	1–2	1–1
3	Septemvri Sofia (R)	32	9	6	17	32	58	−26	33	Qualification for the relegation play-offs	3–2	1–0	—	1–1
4	Dunav Ruse	32	7	8	17	36	55	−19	29	Qualification for the relegation play-offs	0–1	2–0	2–2	—

Source: Soccerway
Legend: Blue = home team win; Yellow = draw; Red = away team win.
Rules for classification: 1) Points; 2) Head-to-head points; 3) Head-to-head goal difference; 4) Head-to-head goals scored; 5) Head-to-head away goals scored (only if two teams); 6) Goal difference; 7) Goals scored; 8) Fairplay ranking; 9) Draw.
(R) Relegated

=== Bulgarian Cup ===
26 September 2018 1st round	Lokomotiv Gorna Oryahovitsa	1–1 (a.e.t.) (6–7 p)	Dunav Ruse	Gorna Oryahovitsa
17:00 EEST	Yordanov (yellow card) 23'; T. Trifonov (yellow card) 40'; Todorov (yellow card) 41'; Yurukov 46'; Penev (yellow card) 82'	Report	Duda (yellow card) 4'; Stanoev 43' (pen.); Petrov (yellow card) 65'; Mensah (yellow card) 83'	Stadium: Lokomotiv Stadium; Attendance: 450; Referee: Nikola Petrov (Lovech)
	Penalties
	Kanev (penalty scored); Petev (penalty missed); K. Trifonov (penalty scored); T. Trifonov (penalty missed); Penev (penalty missed); Nikolov (penalty scored); Kitov (penalty scored); Chalakov (penalty missed); Kalchev (penalty missed); Yurukov (penalty scored); Simeonov (penalty scored); Kanev (penalty missed)		(penalty missed) Patev; (penalty missed) Stanoev; (penalty missed) Ahmedov; (penalty scored) Popadiyn; (penalty scored) Baldzhiyski; (penalty scored) N'Diaye; (penalty scored) Petrov; (penalty missed) Mensah; (penalty missed) Kovachev; (penalty scored) Ben Aicha; (penalty scored) Dimitrov; (penalty scored) Baldzhiyski

30 October 2018 2nd round	Dunav Ruse	1–2	Lokomotiv Plovdiv	Ruse
17:30 EEST	Mensah (yellow card) 43'; A. Aleksandrov 90+1'	Report	Abdullahi (yellow card) 33'; Aralica 64'; Karagaren 68'	Stadium: Gradski Stadium; Attendance: 650; Referee: Stanislav Todorov (Shumen)
