= 2017–18 PFC Beroe Stara Zagora season =

Beroe Stara Zagora
- Full name: Professional Football Club Beroe
- Nickname: Zelenite (The Greens)
- Short name: Beroe
- Founded: 6 May 1916; 110 years ago as Vereya
- Ground: Beroe
- Capacity: 12,128
- Owner: Maritsa East 2 EAD
- Chairman: Ilko Rusev
- Head coach: Aleksandar Tomash
- League: First League
- 2017–18: TBA
- Website: http://www.beroe.bg/
| Home colours | Away colours | Third colours |

Beroe is a Bulgarian professional football club which are based in Stara Zagora. During the 2017/18 campaign they will be competing in the following competitions: First League, Bulgarian cup.

== Friendlies ==
| 16 June 2017 | Beroe Stara Zagora | 2 - 2 | FC Dunav Ruse |
| 18:30 | | Summary |

| 23 June 2017 | Beroe Stara Zagora | 2 - 2 | Cherno More Varna |
| 18:30 | | Summary |

| 26 June 2017 | Slavia Sofia | 0 - 1 | Beroe Stara Zagora |
| 18:30 | | Summary |

| 3 July 2017 | Beroe Stara Zagora (Bulgaria) | 0 - 1 | (Israel) Bnei Yehuda |
| 18:30 | | Summary |

| 7 July 2017 | CSKA Sofia | 1 - 0 | Beroe Stara Zagora |
| 20:00 | | Summary |

== Competitions ==
=== First League ===
==== Regular season ====
===== Table =====
| Pos | Team | Pld | W | D | L | GF | GA | GD | Pts | Qualification |
|---|---|---|---|---|---|---|---|---|---|---|
| 2 | CSKA Sofia | 26 | 19 | 6 | 1 | 59 | 14 | +45 | 63 | Qualification for the Championship round |
| 3 | Levski Sofia | 26 | 14 | 8 | 4 | 37 | 14 | +23 | 50 | Qualification for the Championship round |
| 4 | Beroe | 26 | 12 | 9 | 5 | 33 | 24 | +9 | 45 | Qualification for the Championship round |
| 5 | Botev Plovdiv | 26 | 11 | 9 | 6 | 44 | 29 | +15 | 42 | Qualification for the Championship round |
| 6 | Vereya | 26 | 10 | 5 | 11 | 24 | 34 | −10 | 35 | Qualification for the Championship round |

Source: Soccerway
Rules for classification: 1) Points; 2) Head-to-head points; 3) Head-to-head goal difference; 4) Head-to-head goals scored; 5) Head-to-head away goals scored (only if two teams); 6) Goal difference; 7) Goals scored; 8) Fairplay ranking; 9) Draw.

===== Results summary =====
| Overall | | | | | | | | Home | | | | | | Away | | | | | |
| Pld | W | D | L | GF | GA | GD | Pts | W | D | L | GF | GA | GD | W | D | L | GF | GA | GD |
|---|---|---|---|---|---|---|---|---|---|---|---|---|---|---|---|---|---|---|---|
| 26 | 12 | 9 | 5 | 33 | 24 | +9 | 45 | 4 | 6 | 3 | 15 | 11 | +4 | 8 | 3 | 2 | 18 | 13 | +5 |

Last updated: 17 March 2018.

===== Results by matchday =====
| Matchday | 1 | 2 | 3 | 4 | 5 | 6 | 7 | 8 | 9 | 10 | 11 | 12 | 13 | 14 | 15 | 16 | 17 | 18 | 19 | 20 | 21 | 22 | 23 | 24 | 25 | 26 | 27 | 28 | 29 | 30 | 31 | 32 | 33 | 34 |
|---|---|---|---|---|---|---|---|---|---|---|---|---|---|---|---|---|---|---|---|---|---|---|---|---|---|---|---|---|---|---|---|---|---|---|
| Ground | H | A | H | A | H | A | H | H | A | H | A | H | A | A | | | | | | | | | | | | | | | | | | | | |
| Result | D | D | D | W | D | W | L | W | W | D | L | | | | | | | | | | | | | | | | | | | | | | | |
| Position | 7 | 8 | 10 | 5 | 6 | 5 | 7 | 5 | 3 | 5 | 5 | | | | | | | | | | | | | | | | | | | | | | | |

Updated to match(es) played on 1 October 2017. Source:
A = Away; H = Home; W = Win; D = Draw; L = Loss

===== Matches =====
| 14 July 2017 Match 1 | Beroe Stara Zagora | 0 - 0 | Vereya | Stara Zagora |
| 20:25 | Kato (yellow card) 38'; Pedro Eugénio (yellow card) 54'; Tsonev (yellow card) 68'; Dinkov (yellow card) 70' | Report | Enchev (yellow card) 16' (yellow-red card); Kerkar (yellow card) 65'; Ben Djemia (yellow card) 67' | Stadium: Beroe Stadium; Attendance: 1,800; Referee: (Bulgaria) Georgi Kabakov |

| 24 July 2017 Match 2 | Dunav Rose | 1 - 1 | Beroe Stara Zagora | Ruse |
| 20:30 | Dimov (yellow card) 25'; Kostadinov (yellow card) 73'; Budinov 81' | Report | Pedro Eugénio (yellow card) 22'; Negruț 29'; Tsonev (yellow card) 89' | Stadium: Gradski Stadium; Attendance: 3,500; Referee: (Bulgaria) Dragomir Draganov |

| 29 July 2017 Match 3 | Beroe Stara Zagora | 1 - 1 | Pirin Blagoevgrad | Stara Zagora |
| 18:45 | Dinkov (yellow card) 13'; Tsonev (yellow card) 17'; Raynov 25'; Firțulescu (yellow card) 27'; Ohene (yellow card) 85' | Report | Kostadinov (yellow card) 6' (yellow-red card); Blagov 18' (yellow card) 90+2'; Bashliev (yellow card) 60'; Nichev (yellow card) 63'; Sandev (yellow card) 73'; Nikolov (yellow card) 85' | Stadium: Beroe Stadium; Attendance: 1,300; Referee: (Bulgaria) Stanislav Stavrov |

| 4 August 2017 Match 4 | Slavia Sofia | 1 - 4 | Beroe Stara Zagora | Sofia |
| 18:00 | Minchev (yellow card) 38'; Venkov (yellow card) 45+1'; Matheus Bissi (yellow card) 49'; Dimitrov 57'; Shokolarov (yellow card) 66' | Report | Ohene 22' (yellow card) 55'; Kato (yellow card) 47'; Velkov 69' (o.g.); Pedro Eugénio 83' 90+3' | Stadium: Slavia Stadium; Attendance: 440; Referee: (Bulgaria) Georgi Kabakov |

==== Championship stage ====
| Pos | Team | Pld | W | D | L | GF | GA | GD | Pts | Qualification | LUD | CSK | LEV | BSZ | BOT | VER |
|---|---|---|---|---|---|---|---|---|---|---|---|---|---|---|---|---|
| 1 | Ludogorets Razgrad (C) | 36 | 27 | 7 | 2 | 91 | 22 | +69 | 88 | Qualification for the Champions League first qualifying round | — | 3–2 | 2–2 | 7–0 | 2–2 | 5–0 |
| 2 | CSKA Sofia | 36 | 24 | 9 | 3 | 80 | 26 | +54 | 81 | Qualification for the Europa League first qualifying round | 0–0 | — | 2–2 | 1–0 | 4–1 | 5–1 |
| 3 | Levski Sofia (O) | 36 | 18 | 10 | 8 | 55 | 27 | +28 | 64 | Qualification for the European play-off final | 0–1 | 2–3 | — | 1–2 | 3–2 | 2–0 |
| 4 | Beroe | 36 | 16 | 11 | 9 | 45 | 43 | +2 | 59 | | 1–1 | 1–1 | 0–4 | — | 3−2 | 1–0 |
| 5 | Botev Plovdiv | 36 | 15 | 11 | 10 | 62 | 49 | +13 | 56 | | 2–4 | 2–1 | 1–0 | 2–1 | — | 2–0 |
| 6 | Vereya | 36 | 10 | 6 | 20 | 27 | 61 | −34 | 36 | | 0–3 | 0–2 | 0–2 | 0–3 | 2–2 | — |

Source: Soccerway
Legend: Blue = home team win; Yellow = draw; Red = away team win.
Rules for classification: 1) Points; 2) Head-to-head points; 3) Head-to-head goal difference; 4) Head-to-head goals scored; 5) Head-to-head away goals scored (only if two teams); 6) Goal difference; 7) Goals scored; 8) Fairplay ranking; 9) Draw.
(C) Champions; (O) Play-off winners
