= List of Bulgarian football transfers winter 2020–21 =

This is a list of Bulgarian football transfers for the 2020–21 winter transfer window. Only transfers involving a team from the two professional leagues, First League and Second League are listed.

== First League ==
=== Arda ===
In:

No.	Pos.	Nation	Player
13	DF	FRA	Nicolas Taravel (from (United States) OKC Energy)
18	FW	BUL	Georgi Atanasov (from Levski Sofia)
21	DF	BUL	Martin Kostadinov (loan return from Botev Vratsa)
22	DF	GRE	Manolis Roussakis (on loan from (Greece) Xanthi)
24	DF	BUL	Alex Petkov (from Levski Sofia)
98	FW	BUL	Tonislav Yordanov (from CSKA Sofia)

Out:

No.	Pos.	Nation	Player
7	MF	BUL	Mihail Aleksandrov (to Slavia Sofia)
10	MF	BUL	Svetoslav Kovachev (loan return to Ludogorets)
14	FW	CRO	Andrija Bubnjar (released)
15	MF	FRA	Moussa Haddad (released)
22	MF	CRO	Lovre Knežević (to Etar)
24	DF	IRQ	Rebin Sulaka (to Levski Sofia)
25	DF	BRA	Matheus Leoni (to (Hungary) Kisvárda)

=== Beroe ===
In:

No.	Pos.	Nation	Player
91	FW	BUL	Martin Kamburov (from CSKA 1948)
94	MF	BUL	Iliyan Stefanov (from Lokomotiv Sofia)

Out:

No.	Pos.	Nation	Player
8	MF	GHA	Carlos Ohene (released)

=== Botev Plovdiv ===
In:

No.	Pos.	Nation	Player
3	DF	GUI	Pa Konate (from (Norway) Rosenborg)
5	DF	MKD	Mario Mladenovski (from (Denmark) Fremad Amager)
7	MF	BRA	Marquinhos (on loan from (Brazil) Atlético Mineiro)
19	DF	NOR	Anwar Elyounossi (from (Norway) Sarpsborg 08)
21	MF	GHA	Emmanuel Toku (on loan from (Denmark) Fremad Amager)
22	MF	FRA	Réda Rabeï (from (Denmark) Fremad Amager)
24	MF	SWE	Kevin Höög Jansson (from (Denmark) Fremad Amager)

Out:

No.	Pos.	Nation	Player
6	DF	BRA	Marquinhos Pedroso (released)
20	MF	BUL	Dimitar Proychev (on loan to (Denmark) Fremad Amager)
27	FW	BUL	Ivan Vasilev (on loan to (Denmark) Fremad Amager)

=== Botev Vratsa ===
In:

No.	Pos.	Nation	Player
16	DF	BUL	Petar Genchev (from Ludogorets II)
19	DF	BUL	Angel Tsolov (from Kariana)
20	FW	MKD	Dorian Babunski (from (Japan) Machida Zelvia)
22	MF	BUL	Nikola Kolev (from Etar)
34	GK	BUL	Damyan Damyanov (on loan from Ludogorets II)
77	DF	BUL	Martin Nikolov (from Kariana)

Out:

No.	Pos.	Nation	Player
5	DF	BUL	Vasil Dobrev (released)
16	DF	SRB	Aleksandar Stanisavljević (released)
19	MF	BUL	Ivaylo Mihaylov (to Sportist Svoge)
21	DF	BUL	Martin Kostadinov (loan return to Arda)
23	MF	BUL	Vladislav Uzunov (released)
34	GK	RUS	Dar Korolev (to Sportist Svoge)

=== Cherno More ===
In:

No.	Pos.	Nation	Player
20	FW	POR	Zé Gomes (from (Portugal) Benfica)
23	MF	ESP	Pablo Álvarez (from (Spain) Alavés B)
—	MF	BUL	Petar Vutsov (loan return from Pirin Blagoevgrad)

Out:

No.	Pos.	Nation	Player
11	MF	ALG	Mehdi Boukassi (released)
19	FW	MTQ	Mathias Coureur (to (Turkey) Samsunspor)
31	MF	BUL	Lachezar Yordanov (on loan to Sozopol)
99	MF	BUL	Dani Kiki (released)
—	MF	BUL	Petar Vutsov (to Slavia Sofia, previously on loan to Pirin Blagoevgrad)

=== CSKA Sofia ===
In:

No.	Pos.	Nation	Player
4	DF	NED	Menno Koch (from (Belgium) Eupen)
5	MF	ARG	Federico Varela (from (Turkey) Denizlispor)
17	FW	GHA	Bismark Charles (from (Kosovo) Trepça '89)
30	FW	ECU	Jordy Caicedo (from (Brazil) Vitória)
—	DF	POR	Nuno Tomás (loan return from (Finland) KuPS)

Out:

No.	Pos.	Nation	Player
9	FW	AUS	Tomi Juric (to (Australia) Adelaide United)
10	MF	ITA	Stefano Beltrame (to (Portugal) Marítimo)
13	MF	SEN	Younousse Sankharé (to (Greece) Panathinaikos)
17	FW	BUL	Tonislav Yordanov (to Arda)
22	FW	GAM	Ali Sowe (on loan to (Russia) Rostov)
23	FW	BUL	Ahmed Ahmedov (on loan to (Azerbaijan) Neftçi)
26	DF	BUL	Valentin Antov (on loan to (Italy) Bologna)
—	DF	POR	Nuno Tomás (released)

=== CSKA 1948 ===
In:

No.	Pos.	Nation	Player
4	DF	BUL	Angel Lyaskov (from (Slovenia) Olimpija Ljubljana)
9	FW	BUL	Dimitar Mitkov (on loan from Ludogorets)
19	DF	BUL	Georgi Gospodinov (from Botev Plovdiv)
27	MF	BUL	Borislav Damyanov (from Kariana)
28	MF	BUL	Emanuil Lichev (from Kariana)
88	MF	BUL	Martin Haydarov (from Levski Sofia)
90	FW	BUL	Nikolay Ganchev (from Marek)
91	FW	BUL	Stefan Statev (from (Italy) Ascoli)
—	FW	BUL	Valentin Yoskov (loan return from Etar)

Out:

No.	Pos.	Nation	Player
9	FW	BUL	Martin Kamburov (to Beroe)
17	MF	BUL	Daniel Mladenov (to Etar)
99	FW	BUL	Andon Gushterov (to Pirin Blagoevgrad)
—	FW	BUL	Valentin Yoskov (to Sportist Svoge, previously on loan to Etar)

=== Etar ===
In:

No.	Pos.	Nation	Player
3	DF	PAN	José Córdoba (from (Panama) Independiente de La Chorrera)
4	DF	TUR	Erol Alkan (from (Germany) Türkgücü München)
10	FW	GAB	Gaëtan Missi Mezu (from (Finland) Ilves)
11	FW	BUL	Daniel Mladenov (from CSKA 1948)
16	MF	BUL	Simeon Mechev (from Septemvri Sofia)
17	MF	PAN	Romeesh Ivey (on loan from (Colombia) Alianza Petrolera)
22	MF	CRO	Lovre Knežević (from Arda)
81	DF	BUL	Venelin Filipov (from Slavia Sofia)

Out:

No.	Pos.	Nation	Player
8	MF	BUL	Ivan Mihaylov (to Levski Lom)
9	FW	BUL	Ivan Petkov (to Yantra Gabrovo)
10	MF	BUL	Svilen Shterev (to (North Macedonia) Sileks)
11	MF	BUL	Anton Ognyanov (end of contract)
16	MF	BUL	Steliyan Dobrev (to Slavia Sofia)
22	MF	BUL	Nikola Kolev (to Botev Vratsa)
24	DF	BUL	Georgi Kupenov (to Minyor Pernik)
71	MF	BUL	Daniel Pehlivanov (to Vihren)
72	DF	EST	Mark Edur (to (Estonia) Nõmme Kalju)
98	FW	BUL	Valentin Yoskov (loan return to CSKA 1948)

=== Levski Sofia ===
In:

No.	Pos.	Nation	Player
1	GK	CRO	Zvonimir Mikulić (from (Moldova) Sheriff Tiraspol)
19	FW	MAR	Bilal Bari (from Montana)
20	DF	ESP	Nacho Monsalve (from (Netherlands) NAC Breda)
23	DF	MAR	Faycal Rherras (from (Morocco) Mouloudia Oujda)
91	DF	SUI	Dragan Mihajlović (from (Cyprus) APOEL)
—	DF	IRQ	Rebin Sulaka (from Arda)

Out:

No.	Pos.	Nation	Player
2	DF	BUL	Alex Petkov (to Arda)
7	MF	BRA	Paulinho (to (United Arab Emirates) Khor Fakkan)
15	MF	BUL	Martin Haydarov (to CSKA 1948)
17	FW	CUW	Nigel Robertha (to (United States) D.C. United)
33	GK	BUL	Ivan Andonov (on loan to (Italy) Fiorentina Primavera)
39	DF	BUL	Deyan Ivanov (to Lokomotiv Sofia)
66	DF	BUL	Orlin Starokin (to Pirin Blagoevgrad)
99	MF	BUL	Stanislav Ivanov (to (United States) Chicago Fire)
12	GK	BUL	Petar Ivanov (on loan to Sportist Svoge)
5	DF	IRQ	Rebin Sulaka (released)
28	DF	FRA	Thomas Dasquet (released)
18	MF	GHA	Nasiru Mohammed (released)
23	DF	MAR	Faycal Rherras (released)

=== Lokomotiv Plovdiv ===
In:

No.	Pos.	Nation	Player
11	MF	ENG	Connor Ruane (from (Finland) Inter Turku)
19	FW	BUL	Aleksandar Ivanov (from Rilski Sportist)
22	GK	BUL	Ivaylo Vasilev (from Lokomotiv Sofia)
23	MF	PER	Paolo Hurtado (from (Turkey) Konyaspor)

Out:

No.	Pos.	Nation	Player
11	FW	AUT	Kenan Muslimović (to (Germany) SV Donaustauf)
13	MF	SUI	Valentino Pugliese (to (Netherlands) Dordrecht)
20	DF	SRB	Miloš Petrović (to (Greece) Xanthi)
50	MF	CRO	Filip Mihaljević (to (Croatia) Međimurje)
77	FW	CRO	Ante Aralica (to (Romania) Hermannstadt)

=== Ludogorets ===
In:

No.	Pos.	Nation	Player
1	GK	CRO	Kristijan Kahlina (on loan from (Croatia) Gorica)
19	FW	CYP	Pieros Sotiriou (from (Kazakhstan) Astana)

Out:

No.	Pos.	Nation	Player
33	GK	BRA	Renan dos Santos (released)
81	FW	BUL	Dimitar Mitkov (on loan to CSKA 1948)
—	FW	BRA	Júnior Brandão (on loan to (Portugal) Rio Ave)

=== Montana ===
In:

No.	Pos.	Nation	Player
1	GK	BUL	Mario Kirev (from FC Kyustendil)
4	DF	BUL	Radoslav Terziev (from Slavia Sofia)
7	MF	BUL	Dimitar Zakonov (from Hebar)
17	MF	FRA	Adam Boujamaa (from (Morocco) Mouloudia Oujda)
20	MF	BUL	Mihael Orachev (from CSKA 1948)
26	DF	BUL	Stoyan Predev (from Kariana)

Out:

No.	Pos.	Nation	Player
1	GK	BUL	Marin Orlinov (released)
7	MF	BUL	Ivelin Iliev (to Strumska Slava)
9	FW	MAR	Bilal Bari (to Levski Sofia)
15	DF	BUL	Preslav M. Petrov (to Dobrudzha)
16	MF	BUL	Nikolay Tsvetkov (to Lokomotiv Sofia)
20	MF	BUL	Dimitar Iliev (to Marek)
21	MF	BUL	Borislav Baldzhiyski (to (Kosovo) Liria)

=== Slavia Sofia ===
In:

No.	Pos.	Nation	Player
6	DF	BUL	Kostadin Velkov (from (Germany) Atlas Delmenhorst)
7	MF	AUS	Peter Makrillos (from (Finland) Mariehamn)
12	GK	BUL	Ivan Dermendziev (loan return from Sportist Svoge)
17	MF	BUL	Erol Dost (from Ludogorets II)
29	MF	BUL	Petar Vutsov (from Cherno More, previously on loan to Pirin Blagoevgrad)
70	MF	BUL	Mihail Aleksandrov (from Arda)
75	MF	TUN	Nader Ghandri (on loan from (Belgium) Westerlo)
89	MF	BUL	Steliyan Dobrev (from Etar)
—	MF	ROU	Dragoș Firțulescu (from (India) Chennaiyin)

Out:

No.	Pos.	Nation	Player
7	FW	BUL	Ventsislav Hristov (released)
10	MF	BUL	Yanis Karabelyov (to (Hungary) Kisvárda)
17	DF	BUL	Radoslav Terziev (to Montana)
20	MF	BUL	Filip Krastev (loan return to (Belgium) Lommel)
29	DF	BUL	Venelin Filipov (to Etar)
38	DF	BUL	Milen Gamakov (to (Lithuania) Žalgiris)
73	MF	BUL	Ventsislav Bengyuzov (to Pirin Blagoevgrad)
83	DF	BUL	Hristo Popadiyn (to Tsarsko Selo)
93	MF	BUL	Atanas Kabov (to Septemvri Sofia)
97	MF	BUL	Hristo Ivanov (released)
—	MF	ROU	Dragoș Firțulescu (released)

=== Tsarsko Selo ===
In:

No.	Pos.	Nation	Player
2	DF	FRA	Louis Nganioni (from (Denmark) Fremad Amager)
10	MF	BUL	Dimitar Kostadinov (on loan from Septemvri Sofia)
14	DF	BUL	Hristo Popadiyn (from Slavia Sofia)
44	MF	SRB	Alen Stevanović (from (Poland) Wisła Płock)
89	FW	NED	Lesly de Sa (from (Sweden) Eskilstuna)
99	FW	SUI	Karim Rossi (from (Sweden) Eskilstuna)

Out:

No.	Pos.	Nation	Player
5	DF	BRA	Gustavo Carbonieri (to (Kosovo) Trepça '89)
7	MF	CYP	Giannis Gerolemou (loan return to (Cyprus) AEL Limassol)
9	FW	BUL	Miroslav Budinov (to Minyor Pernik)
10	MF	BUL	Boris Galchev (to Minyor Pernik)
14	MF	BUL	Bozhidar Vasev (to Minyor Pernik)
87	FW	BUL	Toma Ushagelov (released)

== Second League ==
=== Dobrudzha ===
In:

No.	Pos.	Nation	Player

Out:

No.	Pos.	Nation	Player

=== Hebar ===
In:

No.	Pos.	Nation	Player
—	DF	BUL	Nikolay Dichev (from Kariana)
—	MF	BUL	Georgi Tartov (from Kariana)
—	MF	BUL	Evgeni Ignatov (from Kariana)
—	MF	BUL	Nikolay Yankov (from Litex Lovech)

Out:

No.	Pos.	Nation	Player
17	FW	BUL	Aleksandar Dimitrov (released)

=== Litex ===
In:

No.	Pos.	Nation	Player

Out:

No.	Pos.	Nation	Player

=== Lokomotiv GO ===
In:

No.	Pos.	Nation	Player
—	DF	BUL	Ivan Penev (from Sevlievo)

Out:

No.	Pos.	Nation	Player
66	DF	BUL	Kristiyan Raychev (released)

=== Lokomotiv Sofia ===
In:

No.	Pos.	Nation	Player

Out:

No.	Pos.	Nation	Player

=== Ludogorets II ===
In:

No.	Pos.	Nation	Player

Out:

No.	Pos.	Nation	Player
75	DF	BUL	Petar Genchev (to Botev Vratsa)

=== Minyor Pernik ===
In:

No.	Pos.	Nation	Player
—	MF	BUL	Boris Galchev (from Tsarsko Selo)
—	MF	BUL	Bozhidar Vasev (from Tsarsko Selo)
—	FW	BUL	Miroslav Budinov (from Tsarsko Selo)
—	FW	BUL	Redzheb Halil (from Strumska Slava)

Out:

No.	Pos.	Nation	Player

=== Neftochimic ===
In:

No.	Pos.	Nation	Player

Out:

No.	Pos.	Nation	Player

=== Pirin Blagoevgrad ===
In:

No.	Pos.	Nation	Player
6	DF	BUL	Yuliyan Popev (from Strumska Slava)
8	DF	BUL	Orlin Starokin (from Levski Sofia)
10	FW	BUL	Andon Gushterov (from CSKA 1948)
73	MF	BUL	Ventsislav Bengyuzov (from Slavia Sofia)
87	GK	BUL	Dimitar Sheytanov (from (Portugal) Aves)

Out:

No.	Pos.	Nation	Player
1	GK	SUI	Francesco Ruberto (released)
10	FW	ENG	George Oakley (to (Scotland) Kilmarnock)
19	DF	BUL	Miroslav Pushkarov (released)
23	FW	BUL	Dimitar Aleksiev (released)
91	GK	BUL	Ismet Kisyo (released)

=== Septemvri Simitli ===
In:

No.	Pos.	Nation	Player
—	GK	MKD	Metodija Velkovski (from (North Macedonia) Osogovo)

Out:

No.	Pos.	Nation	Player

=== Septemvri Sofia ===
In:

No.	Pos.	Nation	Player

Out:

No.	Pos.	Nation	Player

=== Sozopol ===
In:

No.	Pos.	Nation	Player

Out:

No.	Pos.	Nation	Player

=== Sportist ===
In:

No.	Pos.	Nation	Player

Out:

No.	Pos.	Nation	Player

=== Strumska Slava ===
In:

No.	Pos.	Nation	Player

Out:

No.	Pos.	Nation	Player

=== Yantra ===
In:

No.	Pos.	Nation	Player

Out:

No.	Pos.	Nation	Player
