= Ivan Mihailov (disambiguation) =

Ivan Mihailov may refer to:

- Ivan Mihailov, Bulgarian revolutionary
- Ivan Mihailov (general), Bulgarian Army general
- Ivan Mihailov (boxer), Bulgarian boxer
- Ivan Mihaylov (footballer), Bulgarian footballer
- Ivan Mikhailov (politician), Russian politician
