= Ismail Isa =

Bulgarian footballer

Ismail Isa Mustafa
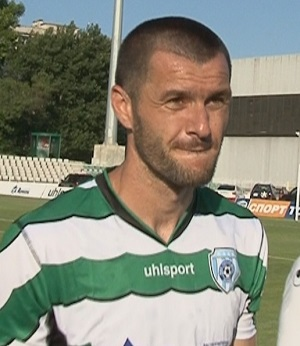

Personal information
- Full name: Ismail Isa Mustafa
- Date of birth: 26 June 1989 (age 37)
- Place of birth: Targovishte, Bulgaria
- Height: 1.83 m (6 ft 0 in)
- Position: Forward

Youth career
- Levski Omurtag
- –2005: Svetkavitsa Targovishte

Senior career*
Years	Team	Apps	(Gls)
2005–2006	Svetkavitsa	8	(2)
2006–2007	Haskovo	32	(14)
2008–2011	Levski Sofia	22	(3)
2008–2009	→ Sliven (loan)	17	(1)
2009–2010	→ Lokomotiv Mezdra (loan)	25	(10)
2011–2012	Karabükspor	3	(0)
2012	→ Elazığspor (loan)	6	(2)
2012–2013	Litex Lovech	24	(11)
2013–2015	Sheriff Tiraspol	44	(14)
2015–2016	Beroe	25	(7)
2016–2017	Dacia Chișinău	19	(5)
2017	Vereya	7	(2)
2018–2019	Dunav Ruse	27	(9)
2019–2021	Cherno More	50	(13)
2022–2025	Cherno More	80	(11)

International career^{‡}
2007–2008	Bulgaria U19	?	(?)
2009	Bulgaria U21	1	(0)
2015	Bulgaria B	1	(0)
2019–2020	Bulgaria	8	(1)
- * Club domestic league appearances and goals as of 06:02, 27 May 2025 (UTC) ‡ National team caps and goals as of 14 October 2020

Ismail Isa Mustafa (Bulgarian: Исмаил Иса Мустафа; born 26 June 1989) is a retired Bulgarian professional footballer who plays as a forward.

== Club career ==
Born in Targovishte, Isa started playing football at PFC Svetkavitsa's youth teams.

=== Levski Sofia ===
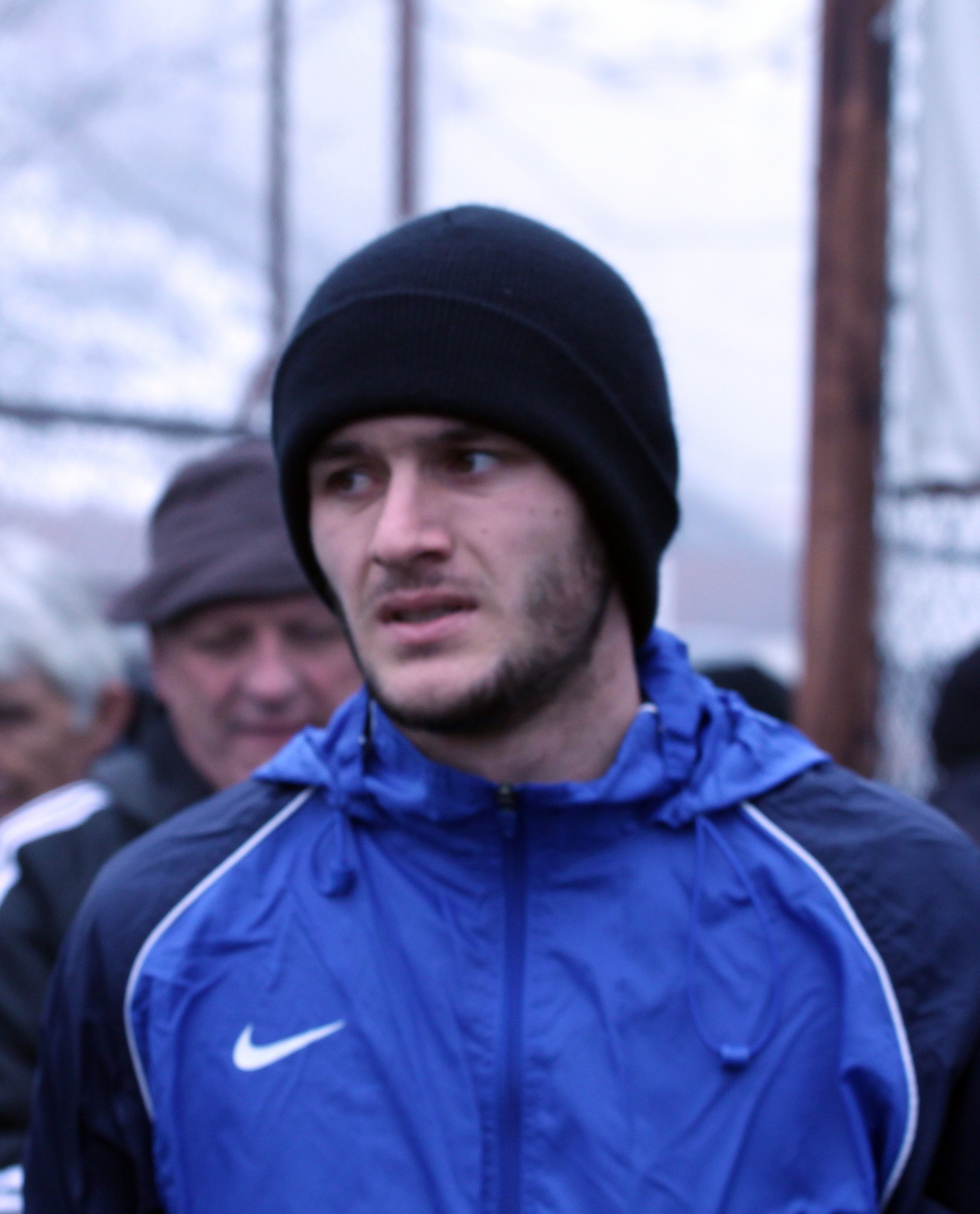
Isa with Levski Sofia

Ismail Isa made his unofficial debut for Levski in a friendly match against Dynamo Kyiv on 20 January 2008. He played for 33 minutes. The result was a 1–2 loss for Levski. On 20 February, he scored his first goals in a friendly against Vidima-Rakovski Sevlievo. He scored two goals in the 75th and 85th minute. The result of the match was a 3–0 win for Levski. He made his official debut in a 1–0 defeat away to Lokomotiv Plovdiv.

During the 2008–09 season, he was loaned to OFC Sliven 2000. Anyway, after the end of the season, he returned to Levski.

Isa re-debuted for Levski on 15 July 2009 in the 2nd Qualifying round of UEFA Champions League, where Levski defeated the team of UE Sant Julià. The result of the match was 4–0 with a home win for Levski. On 21 July, he was sent off at the stroke of half time for a second bookable offense in the return leg against the Andorran side, but despite playing a man down his team won 5–0. His return was in a match against Dundalk – a second qualifying round of Europa League. Levski won the first match and the result was 6:0. Isa scored two of the goals. He further added to his tally in the 5–2 home win against the Swedish Kalmar FF, where he scored another two goals.

Isa scored his first goal for Levski in the Bulgarian A Professional Football Group on 23 August 2010 against Kaliakra Kavarna.

==== Lokomotiv Mezdra (loan) ====
On 2 August 2009, Ismail Isa was loaned for half a season in Lokomotiv Mezdra. After matches, in which he scored 7 goals in 12 matches, Isa returned to Levski. Shortly afterwards on 11 January 2010, though, he was loaned out to Lokomotiv Mezdra again. On 21 March 2010, he scored the only goal for his side to give the team from Mezdra a 1:0 lead against the other Bulgarian top team CSKA Sofia. This goal got him in the news since just a few minutes after it the CSKA supporters flooded the field and stopped the match, earning their team a 3–0 disciplinary loss (4:0 aggregate loss). After scoring 11 goals in 25 caps Isa was brought back to Levski on 24 May.

=== Karabükspor ===
In June 2011, Isa joined Turkish Super League club Karabükspor. Media reports estimated the transfer fee to be around €200,000. On 22 October 2011, Isa made his official debut for his new team, playing the first 85 minutes and earning himself a yellow card in the 2:0 home win over Istanbul B.B. in a Turkish Süper Lig match.

=== Litex ===
Isa was signed by Litex Lovech for the 2012/2013 season and netted 7 goals in 11 appearances during the first half of the season. He finished the 2012/2013 A PFG season as the fifth highest goal scorer in the league, having managed 11 goals.

=== Sheriff Tiraspol ===
In June 2013, Isa signed a contract with Moldovan club Sheriff Tiraspol. He marked his debut by scoring a goal in the 2:0 win over FC Tiraspol in a Moldovan Super Cup match that was held on 29 June.

=== Beroe ===
Isa returned to Bulgaria, joining Beroe Stara Zagora in September 2015.

=== Vereya ===
On 19 October 2017, Isa signed with First League side Vereya.

== International career ==
Isa was a part of the Bulgaria national under-19 football team. During his time with the team he played in the 2008 UEFA European Under-19 Football Championship in the Czech Republic. On 29 April 2008, he scored a goal in qualifying match against Norway.

On 7 February 2015, Isa made his first appearance for Bulgaria, in the 0–0 draw against Romania in a non-official friendly match, playing over the course of the first 70 minutes. He was recalled to the national team in May 2019 by new manager Krasimir Balakov and played as a starter in the 1–2 away loss against the Czech Republic in a Euro 2020 qualifier on 7 June 2019, opening the scoring with his first international goal.

== Personal life ==
His family is of Turkish descent.

== Career statistics ==
=== Club ===
As of 28 April 2024

Appearances and goals by club, season and competition
Club	Season	League		Cup		Europe		Other		Total	
Club	Season	Apps	Goals	Apps	Goals	Apps	Goals	Apps	Goals	Apps	Goals
Svetkavitsa	2005–06	8	2	0	0	–		–		8	2
Haskovo	2006–07	21	9	0	0	–		–		21	9
Haskovo	2007–08	11	5	0	0	–		–		11	5
Levski Sofia	2007–08	3	0	0	0	0	0	–		3	0
Levski Sofia	2009–10	0	0	0	0	2	0	–		2	0
Levski Sofia	2010–11	19	3	2	0	6	4	–		27	7
Sliven 2000 (loan)	2008–09	17	1	2	0	–		–		19	1
Lokomotiv Mezdra (loan)	2009–10	25	10	1	0	–		–		26	10
Kardemir Karabükspor	2011–12	3	0	0	0	–		–		3	0
Elazığspor (loan)	2011–12	6	1	0	0	–		–		6	1
Litex Lovech	2012–13	24	11	4	3	0	0	–		28	14
Sheriff Tiraspol	2013–14	26	11	3	0	8	4	1	1	38	16
Sheriff Tiraspol	2014–15	19	1	3	2	6	2	1	0	29	5
Beroe Stara Zagora	2015–16	25	7	5	2	0	0	–		30	9
Dacia Chișinău	2016–17	19	5	1	1	0	0	–		20	6
Vereya Stara Zagora	2017–18	7	2	0	0	–		–		7	2
Dunav Ruse	2017–18	6	4	0	0	–		5	0	11	4
Dunav Ruse	2018–19	21	5	1	0	–		4	2	26	7
Cherno More	2019–20	23	13	1	0	–		–		24	13
Cherno More	2020–21	27	0	1	1	–		1	0	29	1
Cherno More	2022–23	24	3	5	1	–		–		29	4
Cherno More	2023–24	25	5	1	0	–		–		26	5
Career total		339	96	25	9	22	10	2	1	388	116

=== International ===
Scores and results list Bulgaria's goal tally first.

No.	Date	Venue	Opponent	Score	Result	Competition
1.	7 June 2019	Stadion Letná, Prague, Czech Republic	Czech Republic	1–0	1–2	UEFA Euro 2020 qualification

== Honours ==
Levski Sofia

- Bulgarian A Football Group (1) - 2008-09
- Bulgarian Supercup (1) - 2009

FC Sheriff Tiraspol

- Moldovan Super Cup (1) - 2013
- Moldovan National Division: 2013–14
