= Preslav Petrov (footballer, born 1995) =

Bulgarian footballer

Personal information
- Full name: Preslav Ivelinov Petrov
- Date of birth: 1 May 1995 (age 31)
- Place of birth: Troyan, Bulgaria
- Height: 1.78 m (5 ft 10 in)
- Position: Left back

Youth career
- Litex Lovech
- Vidima-Rakovski

Senior career*
Years	Team	Apps	(Gls)
2012–2014	Vidima-Rakovski	24	(0)
2014–2017	Ludogorets Razgrad	4	(0)
2015–2017	Ludogorets Razgrad II	43	(1)
2017–2018	Dunav Ruse	11	(0)
2019	Slavia Sofia	10	(0)
2019–2020	Montana	16	(0)
2020–2021	Grafičar Beograd	4	(0)

International career^{‡}
2013–2014	Bulgaria U19	5	(0)
- * Club domestic league appearances and goals as of 15 May 2021 ‡ National team caps and goals as of 25 September 2020

Preslav Ivelinov Petrov (Bulgarian: Преслав Ивелинов Петров; born 1 May 1995) is a Bulgarian footballer who plays as a defender.

== Career ==
=== Youth career ===
Petrov started his career in Litex Lovech. He later joined Vidima-Rakovski's academy and eventually made a professional debut for the team in 2012. On 6 June 2014, Petrov joined Ludogorets Razgrad.

Together with Steven Petkov, he was witness about the 2014 U19 team match fixing scandal.

=== Ludogorets Razgrad ===
Petrov made his professional debut for the team on 9 August 2014 in a match against PFC Lokomotiv Plovdiv. During the 2015–16 season after the creation of the 2nd teams, Petrov became a regular for Ludogorets Razgrad II in the B Group.

=== Dunav Ruse ===
On 6 June 2017 he signed a contract with Dunav Ruse.

=== Grafičar ===
In the season 2020–21, after a short spell with FC Montana, he signed with Serbian second-tier side FK Grafičar Beograd.

== Club statistics ==
=== Club ===
As of 31 May 2017

Club performance			League		Cup		Continental		Other		Total	
Club	League	Season	Apps	Goals	Apps	Goals	Apps	Goals	Apps	Goals	Apps	Goals
Bulgaria			League		Bulgarian Cup		Europe		Other (Note: Includes Bulgarian Supercup matches.)		Total	
Vidima-Rakovski	A Group	2011–12	1	0	0	0	–		–		1	0
Vidima-Rakovski	B Group	2012–13	0	0	0	0	–		–		0	0
Vidima-Rakovski	North-West V Group	2013–14	23	0	1	0	–		–		24	0
Vidima-Rakovski	Total		24	0	1	0	0	0	0	0	25	0
Ludogorets Razgrad	A Group	2014–15	1	0	0	0	0	0	0	0	1	0
Ludogorets Razgrad	A Group	2015–16	1	0	0	0	0	0	0	0	1	0
Ludogorets Razgrad	First League	2016–17	2	0	3	0	0	0	—		5	0
Ludogorets Razgrad	Total		4	0	3	0	0	0	0	0	7	0
Ludogorets Razgrad II	B Group	2015–16	16	1	–		–		–		16	1
Ludogorets Razgrad II	Second League	2016–17	27	0	–		–		–		27	0
Career Total			71	1	4	0	0	0	0	0	75	1

== Honours ==
Ludogorets

- First Professional League: 2014–15, 2015–16
- Bulgarian Cup runners-up: 2017
- Bulgarian Supercup winner: 2014
- Bulgarian Supercup runners-up: 2015
