= Krasimir Stanoev =

Bulgarian footballer

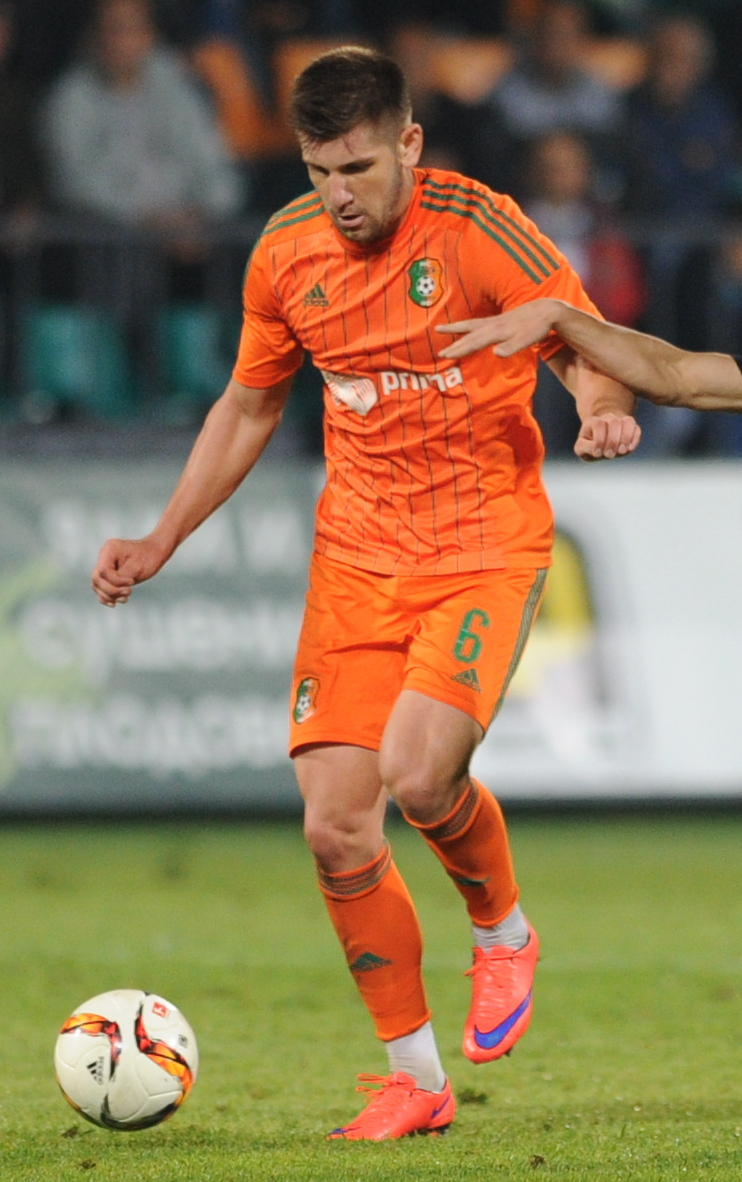

Personal information
- Full name: Krasimir Rumenov Stanoev
- Date of birth: 14 September 1994 (age 32)
- Place of birth: Blagoevgrad, Bulgaria
- Height: 1.85 m (6 ft 1 in)
- Positions: Centre back; defensive midfielder

Team information
- Current team: Lokomotiv Sofia
- Number: 31

Youth career
- 2004–2010: Pirin 2001
- 2010–2013: Litex Lovech

Senior career*
Years	Team	Apps	(Gls)
2012–2016	Litex Lovech	17	(0)
2013	→ Pirin Razlog (loan)	12	(0)
2014	→ Dobrudzha (loan)	28	(7)
2015	→ Pirin Blagoevgrad (loan)	6	(0)
2015–2016	Litex Lovech II	14	(1)
2016–2017	CSKA Sofia II	24	(4)
2016–2017	CSKA Sofia	2	(0)
2017–2019	Dunav Ruse	44	(3)
2019–2020	Etar	23	(2)
2020–2023	Pirin Blagoevgrad	73	(11)
2023	Septemvri Sofia	15	(1)
2023–	Lokomotiv Sofia	98	(7)

International career
2013	Bulgaria U19	2	(0)
2014–2015	Bulgaria U21	2	(0)
- * Club domestic league appearances and goals as of 11 June 2026

Krasimir Stanoev (Bulgarian: Красимир Станоев; born 14 September 1994) is a Bulgarian professional footballer who plays as a centre back or defensive midfielder for First League club Lokomotiv Sofia.

== Career ==
=== Dunav Ruse ===
On 12 June 2017 he left CSKA Sofia to join the other Bulgarian First League team of Dunav Ruse.

== Personal ==
In May 2020, Stanoev tested positive for COVID-19.

== Career statistics ==
=== Club ===
As of 9 November 2015

Club performance			League		Cup		Continental		Other		Total	
Club	League	Season	Apps	Goals	Apps	Goals	Apps	Goals	Apps	Goals	Apps	Goals
Bulgaria			League		Bulgarian Cup		Europe		Other (Note: Includes Bulgarian Supercup matches.)		Total	
Litex Lovech	A Group	2012–13	1	0	0	0	0	0	–		1	0
Pirin Razlog	B Group	2013–14	12	0	2	0	–		–		14	0
Dobrudzha Dobrich	B Group	2013–14	13	4	2	0	–		–		15	4
Dobrudzha Dobrich	B Group	2014–15	15	3	1	0	–		–		16	3
Pirin Blagoevgrad	B Group	2014–15	6	0	0	0	–		–		6	0
Litex Lovech II	B Group	2015–16	2	0	–		–		–		2	0
Litex Lovech	A Group	2015–16	14	0	0	0	0	0	–		14	0
Litex Lovech	Litex Total		15	0	0	0	0	0	0	0	15	0
Career statistics			63	7	5	0	0	0	0	0	68	7

== Honours ==
Individual

- Bulgarian First League Goal of the Week: 2021–22 (Week 4) v. CSKA 1948
