= Martin Kovachev =

Bulgarian footballer

Personal information
- Full name: Martin Stoyanov Kovachev
- Date of birth: 13 March 1982 (age 44)
- Place of birth: Kyustendil, Bulgaria
- Height: 1.92 m (6 ft 4 in)
- Position: Centre back

Team information
- Current team: Chernolomets Popovo
- Number: 16

Senior career*
Years	Team	Apps	(Gls)
2000–2004	Velbazhd Kyustendil	18	(2)
2004–2006	Spartak Varna	22	(2)
2006–2008	Litex Lovech	20	(0)
2006–2008	→ Dunav Ruse (loan)	43	(6)
2008–2009	Chernomorets Burgas	28	(1)
2009	→ Naftex Burgas (loan)	22	(1)
2009–2010	Sliven 2000	40	(3)
2011	Vostok	18	(1)
2011–2012	Botev Vratsa	20	(1)
2012–2013	Montana	24	(1)
2013–2014	Pelister	21	(3)
2014	Haskovo	8	(0)
2015	Pusamania Borneo	1	(0)
2015–2016	Dunav Ruse	28	(4)
2016–2017	Pelister	43	(4)
2018–2019	Dunav Ruse	64	(3)
2020	Makedonija GP	13	(0)
2021–2022	Chernolomets Popovo	13	(1)
2022	Rilski Sportist	3	(0)
2023–	Chernolomets Popovo	76	(13)
- * Club domestic league appearances and goals as of 20 November 2026

Martin Kovachev (Bulgarian: Мартин Ковачев; born 13 March 1982) is a Bulgarian professional footballer who plays as a defender for Chernolomets Popovo.

== Career ==
Kovachev played for Velbazhd Kyustendil, Spartak Varna, Litex Lovech and Dunav Rousse before moving to Chernomorets in June 2008 for a free transfer. With the club Kovachev played in a matches of Intertoto Cup 2008 against Slovenian ND Gorica and Swiss Grasshopper Club Zürich. Six months later he is loaned to Naftex Burgas. On 5 July 2009 Kovachev signed three years contract with OFC Sliven 2000.

On 29 December 2014, he signed with Pusamania Borneo FC.

== Honours ==
Pelister

- Macedonian Cup: 2016–17
