= Steven Petkov =

Bulgarian footballer

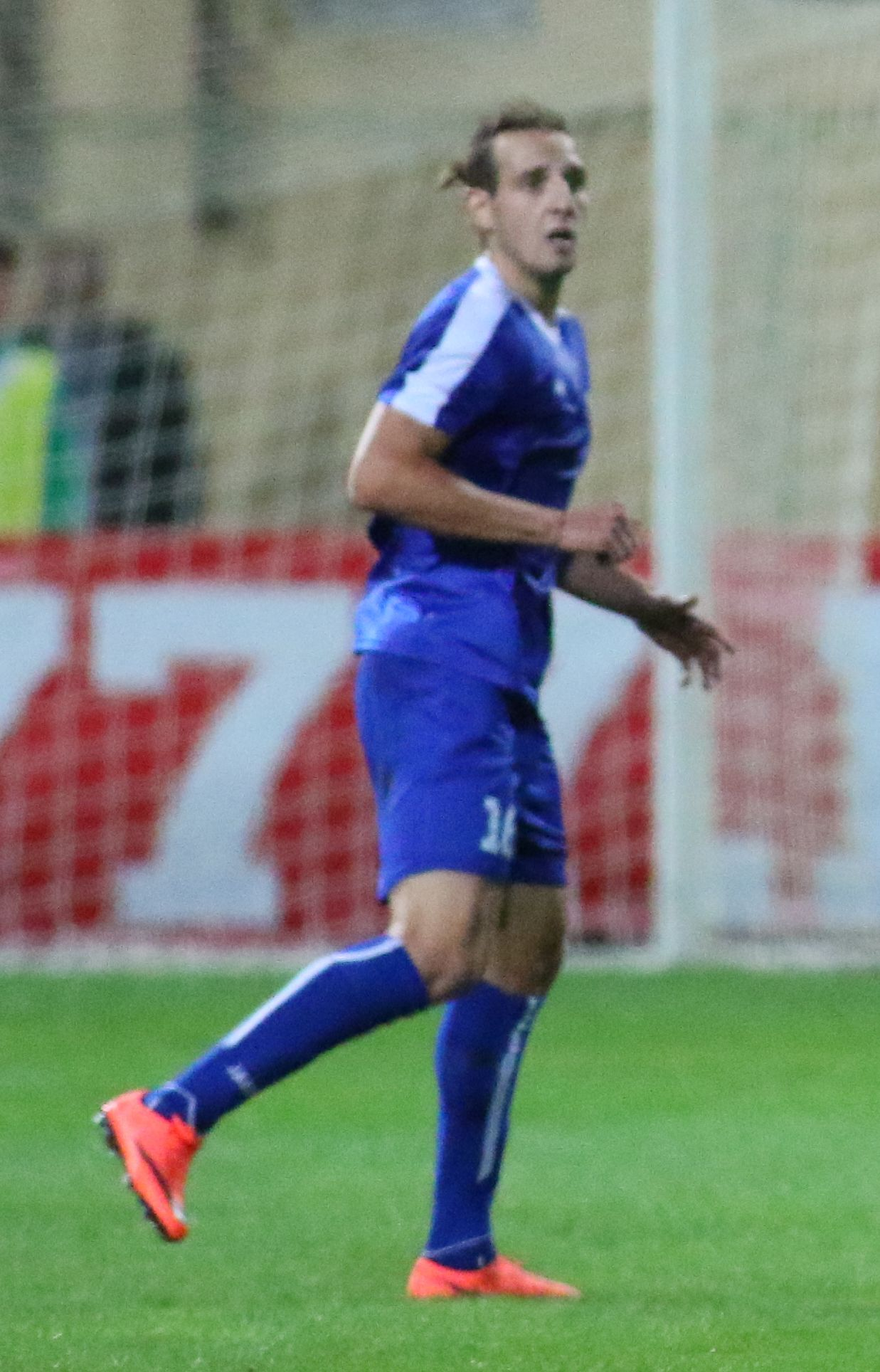

Personal information
- Full name: Steven Valentinov Petkov
- Date of birth: 7 May 1995 (age 31)
- Place of birth: Sofia, Bulgaria
- Height: 1.85 m (6 ft 1 in)
- Position: Forward

Team information
- Current team: Ponferradina
- Number: 11

Youth career
- 2001–2004: Botev Vratsa
- 2004–2014: Levski Sofia

Senior career*
Years	Team	Apps	(Gls)
2012–2014	Levski Sofia	7	(0)
2014	Ludogorets Razgrad	0	(0)
2015–2016	Beroe Stara Zagora	18	(1)
2016–2017	Montana	23	(7)
2017–2018	Botev Plovdiv	44	(21)
2019–2022	Feirense	39	(13)
2019	→ Karviná (loan)	11	(0)
2020–2021	→ Levski Sofia (loan)	14	(1)
2022–2023	Moreirense	10	(1)
2023–2024	Académico de Viseu	22	(0)
2024–2025	Feirense	33	(6)
2025–2026	Botev Plovdiv	12	(0)
2026–	Ponferradina	3	(0)

International career
2011–2012	Bulgaria U17	6	(3)
2014	Bulgaria U19	3	(0)
- * Club domestic league appearances and goals as of 25 May 2026

Steven Valentinov Petkov (Bulgarian: Стивън Валентинов Петков; born 7 May 1995) is a Bulgarian professional footballer who plays as a forward for Spanish Primera Federación club Ponferradina.

== Career ==
Born in Sofia, Petkov arrived in Levski Sofia's youth academy in 2004, from Botev Vratsa, and progressed through the club's youth academy. He made his first team debut at 16 years and 351 days, when he came off the bench against Kaliakra Kavarna on 23 April 2012.

=== Ludogorets Razgrad ===
On 3 July 2014, Petkov joined the Bulgarian champion Ludogorets Razgrad. On 5 August, Petkov was released from the team due to a match-fixing scandal involving Bulgaria U19.

==== Match-fixing scandal ====
Just before the UEFA Euro U19 2014 Petkov was released from the Bulgaria U19. After the team came back from the tournament it was announced that there had been a scheme for match-fixing, according to which the Bulgarian team should lose the matches with big results. Dimitar Gyaurov was arrested for this. Later it was announced that Petkov had been part of the scheme. He talked with other players from the team to join him and to lose the matches for money, but the player Stefan Velkov revealed this to head coach Aleksandar Dimitrov. On 5 August 2014, the Bulgarian Football Union announced that Petkov is with blocked rights to play football until the investigation is over. Later that day Ludogorets announced that Petkov is released from the team due to this scandal. On 7 May 2015, Petkov gained back his rights to play after he was not indicted.

On 8 April 2016. Petkov was found not guilty in taking part of the scheme. Same day was found out that the footballer who revealed to the coach about the scheme was Preslav Petrov and together they were witnesses on the case.

=== Beroe Stara Zagora ===
In June 2015, Petkov signed a contract with Beroe Stara Zagora.

=== Montana ===
Petkov played one season for Montana but left the club in July 2017.

=== Botev Plovdiv ===
==== 2017–18 ====
On 14 August 2017, Petkov signed a two-year contract with Botev Plovdiv. A few days later, he made his debut and scored a goal during the 2–1 defeat from Cherno More Varna. On 27 October Petkov scored the winning goal for the 2–1 away win over Pirin Blagoevgrad. A week later, on 3 November, he scored just a few seconds after he came on the pitch as a substitute for the 1–1 draw with Slavia Sofia.

Despite scoring numerous important goals, Petkov was never included in the starting line-up until 12 December. He used the opportunity to impress and scored a hat-trick for the 5–0 win over Litex Lovech in the quarter final of the Bulgarian Cup.

On 12 March, on day when Botev Plovdiv celebrated 106 years from its foundation, Petkov scored in a 4–2 away win over FC Vereya. On 31 March 2018 Steven scored the only goal for Botev Plovdiv during the 4–1 away defeat from CSKA Sofia. A week later, on 6 April, he came on as a substitute and scored the winning goal for the 1–0 victory over Levski Sofia.

On 14 April Petkov scored during the 3–2 away defeat by Beroe Stara Zagora. A week later, on 21 April he scored again in Stara Zagora, this time during the 2–2 away draw with FC Vereya. On 29 April he scored a goal for the 2–1 home win over CSKA Sofia and won the award for man of the match. A week later, on 5 May, during the first half he scored again but this time Botev Plovdiv was dramatically defeated with 3–2 by Levski Sofia.

==== 2018–19 ====
On 28 July 2018, Petkov scored his first goal for the season for the 0–2 away win over Septemvri Sofia. He was selected for the man of the match. On 3 August Petkov scored during a 2–0 home win over Etar Veliko Tarnovo. A week later, on 11 August, he scored again but this time his team lost the away game against Beroe Stara Zagora.

=== Feirense ===
On 4 January 2019, Petkov was transferred to Portuguese Primeira Liga side Feirense for an undisclosed fee, signing a contract until the summer of 2022. On 10 February 2019, he scored his first goal for the club, a bicycle kick, in a 1–3 loss to Sporting. Feirense announced on 1 September 2019, that Petkov had been loaned out to Czech club MFK Karviná until the end of the 2019–20 season. On 14 September 2020, Feirense sent Petkov on a season-long loan to Levski Sofia.

=== Moreirense ===
On 10 September 2022, recently relegated to Liga Portugal 2 side Moreirense announced the free signing of Petkov on a one-year deal, after his contract with Feirense had expired. After achieving promotion with the Moreira de Cónegos club, Petkov's contract expired and he became a free agent.

=== Académico de Viseu ===
On 28 August 2023, Petkov signed a one-year contract with Liga Portugal 2 club Académico de Viseu.

=== Feirense ===
On 11 July 2024, Petkov moved to fellow league-side and former club Feirense.

=== Ponferradina ===
On 19 January 2026, Petkov signed with Ponferradina in the Spanish third tier.

== Career statistics ==
=== Club ===
As of 31 October 2021

Appearances and goals by club, season and competition
Club	Season	League			National cup (Note: Includes appearances in the Bulgarian Cup, Bulgarian Supercup, Taça de Portugal and Taça da Liga.)		Europe		Total	
Club	Season	Division	Apps	Goals	Apps	Goals	Apps	Goals	Apps	Goals
Levski Sofia	2011–12	A Group	1	0	0	0	0	0	1	0
Levski Sofia	2012–13	A Group	0	0	0	0	0	0	0	0
Levski Sofia	2013–14	A Group	6	0	0	0	0	0	6	0
Levski Sofia	Total		7	0	0	0	0	0	7	0
Ludogorets Razgrad	2014–15	A Group	0	0	0	0	0	0	0	0
Beroe Stara Zagora	2015–16	A Group	18	1	0	0	0	0	18	1
Montana	2016–17	Bulgarian First League	23	7	2	1	–		25	8
Botev Plovdiv	2017–18	Bulgarian First League	26	15	5	4	0	0	31	19
Botev Plovdiv	2018–19	Bulgarian First League	18	6	2	1	–		20	7
Feirense	2018–19	Primeira Liga	12	1	1	0	–		13	1
Feirense	2019–20	LigaPro	1	0	0	0	–		1	0
Feirense	2021–22	LigaPro	4	2	1	1	–		5	3
Feirense	Total		17	3	2	1	0	0	19	4
Karviná (loan)	2019–20	Czech First League	11	0	1	0	–		12	0
Levski Sofia (loan)	2020–21	Bulgarian First League	14	1	3	0	0	0	17	1
Career total			132	33	15	7	0	0	148	40

== Honours ==
Individual

- Primeira Liga Goal of the Month: February 2019
