= Iliya Munin =

Bulgarian footballer

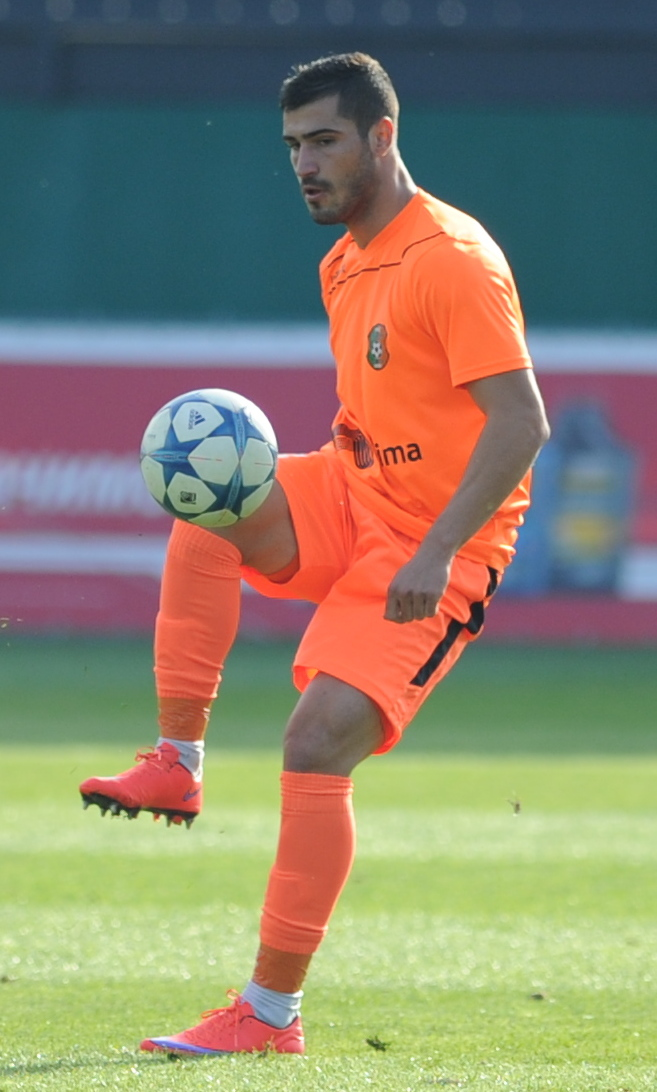
- Munin playing for Litex II in 2015

Personal information
- Full name: Iliya Georgiev Munin
- Date of birth: 16 January 1993 (age 33)
- Place of birth: Dobrinishte, Bulgaria
- Height: 1.81 m (5 ft 11 in)
- Position: Right-back

Team information
- Current team: Bansko

Youth career
- Pirin Blagoevgrad
- Levski Sofia

Senior career*
Years	Team	Apps	(Gls)
2012–2013	Lyubimets 2007	25	(0)
2014	Beroe	11	(0)
2015	Litex Lovech	0	(0)
2015	Litex Lovech II	11	(0)
2016	Bansko	11	(0)
2016–2018	Vereya	39	(1)
2019	Dunav Ruse	6	(1)
2019–2020	Bansko	10	(1)
2020–2021	Septemvri Simitli	31	(3)
2022–	Bansko		

International career
2013–2014	Bulgaria U21	7	(0)
- * Club domestic league appearances and goals as of 17 August 2019

Iliya Munin (Bulgarian: Илия Мунин; born 16 January 1993) is a Bulgarian footballer who plays as a right-back for PFC Bansko.

== Career statistics ==
=== Club ===
As of 10 January 2015

Club	Season	Division	League		Bulgarian Cup		Europe		Total	
Club	Season	Division	Apps	Goals	Apps	Goals	Apps	Goals	Apps	Goals
Lyubimets 2007	2012–13	B Group	12	0	0	0	–		12	0
Lyubimets 2007	2013–14	A Group	13	0	1	0	–		14	0
Beroe Stara Zagora	2013–14	A Group	4	0	0	0	–		4	0
Beroe Stara Zagora	2014–15	A Group	7	0	0	0	–		7	0
Litex Lovech	2014–15	A Group	0	0	0	0	–		0	0
Litex Lovech	2015–16	A Group	0	0	0	0	0	0	0	0
Total	Bulgaria		36	0	1	0	0	0	37	0
