= Emin Ahmed =

Bulgarian footballer

Personal information
- Full name: Emin Zülküf Ahmed
- Date of birth: 10 March 1996 (age 30)
- Place of birth: Chernoochene, Bulgaria
- Height: 1.72 m (5 ft 8 in)
- Positions: Right back; winger

Team information
- Current team: Botev Galabovo
- Number: 15

Youth career
- 2010–2015: Beroe

Senior career*
Years	Team	Apps	(Gls)
2015–2019	Beroe	28	(1)
2017	→ Nesebar (loan)	6	(0)
2018	→ Vereya (loan)	7	(0)
2019	→ Dunav Ruse (loan)	3	(0)
2019	Lokomotiv GO	3	(0)
2019–	Botev Galabovo	11	(0)

International career
2016–2018	Bulgaria U21	3	(0)
- * Club domestic league appearances and goals as of 15 December 2019

Emin Аhmed (Bulgarian: Емин Aхмед; born 10 March 1996) is a Bulgarian footballer of Turkish descent who plays as a right-back for Botev Galabovo.

== Career ==
=== Beroe ===
Ahmed bеgan his career in Beroe Stara Zagora. On 23 September 2015 he made his debut for the team for the Bulgarian Cup against Svetkavitsa Targovishte. 4 days later he made his official debut in the A Group for the team.

==== Nesebar (loan) ====
In February 2017, Ahmed was loaned to Nesebar until the end of the season.

==== Vereya (loan) ====
On 20 June 2018, Ahmed was loaned to local rivals Vereya until the end of the year.

== Career statistics ==
=== Club ===
As of 10 March 2016

Club performance			League		Cup		Continental		Other		Total	
Club	League	Season	Apps	Goals	Apps	Goals	Apps	Goals	Apps	Goals	Apps	Goals
Bulgaria			League		Bulgarian Cup		Europe		Other (Note: Includes Bulgarian Supercup matches.)		Total	
Beroe Stara Zagora	A Group	2015–16	6	0	1	0	0 (Note: UEFA Europa League matches.)	0	–		7	0
Beroe Stara Zagora	Total		6	0	1	0	0	0	0	0	7	0
Career statistics			6	0	1	0	0	0	0	0	7	0
