= Ivan Stoyanov (footballer, born 1994) =

Bulgarian footballer

Personal information
- Full name: Ivan Veselinov Stoyanov
- Date of birth: 25 July 1994 (age 32)
- Place of birth: Nesebar, Bulgaria
- Position: Defender

Team information
- Current team: Nesebar
- Number: 3

Youth career
- Nesebar

Senior career*
Years	Team	Apps	(Gls)
2012–2014	Nesebar	48	(5)
2014–2015	Chernomorets Burgas	18	(0)
2015–2017	Nesebar	57	(2)
2017–2021	Septemvri Sofia	70	(3)
2021–	Nesebar	4	(0)
- * Club domestic league appearances and goals as of 8 December 2021

Ivan Stoyanov (Bulgarian: Иван Стоянов; born 25 July 1994) is a Bulgarian footballer who plays as a defender for Nesebar.
