= Duda (footballer, born 1994) =

Brazilian footballer

Personal information
- Full name: Eduardo Haas Gehlen
- Date of birth: 19 April 1994 (age 32)
- Place of birth: Montenegro, Brazil
- Height: 1.81 m (5 ft 11 1/2 in)
- Positions: Right back; left back

Youth career
- –2010: Vasco da Gama
- 2011–2013: Grêmio
- 2013: Coritiba
- 2014: Juventude

Senior career*
Years	Team	Apps	(Gls)
2015–2017	Juventude	29	(1)
2017	→ Inter de Lages (loan)	1	(0)
2018	Operário-MS	0	(0)
2018	Grêmio Anápolis	5	(0)
2018	Portuguesa	0	(0)
2018	Dunav Ruse	1	(0)
2019	Maringá	6	(0)
2019	AC Kajaani	24	(1)
2020	São Luiz	3	(0)
2020	OTP United	12	(1)
2020–2021	Almagro	26	(0)
2021	Veranópolis		
2022	CRAC	9	(1)
2022	Bahia de Feira	11	(0)
2023	CRAC	11	(0)
- * Club domestic league appearances and goals as of 23:19, 5 April 2024 (UTC)

Eduardo Haas Gehlen (born 19 April 1994), commonly known as Duda, is a Brazilian footballer who plays as a right back.

== Career ==
=== Juventude ===
Duda made his league debut against SC São Paulo on 11 February 2015. He scored his first goal for the club against Portuguesa on 4 July 2015, scoring in the 65th minute.

=== Inter de Lages ===
Duda made his league debut against Almirante Barroso on 1 February 2017.

=== Operário-MS ===
Duda didn't make any appearances for Operário-MS, only appearing on the bench once in the Copa Verde against Cuiabá on 15 February 2018.

=== Grêmio Anápolis ===
Duda made his league debut against EC Rio Verde on 25 February 2018.

=== Dunav Ruse ===
Duda signed with Bulgarian club Dunav Ruse on 7 August 2018 on a two-year deal. He made his league debut against Ludogorets on 2 September 2018.

=== Maringá ===
Duda made his league debut against Rio Branco SC on 20 January 2019.

=== AC Kajaani ===
Duda made his league debut against Oulu on 6 May 2019. He scored his first goal for the club against Myllykosken Pallo −47 on 31 August 2019, scoring in the 51st minute.

=== São Luiz ===
Duda made his league debut against Esportivo on 1 March 2020.

=== Almagro ===
Duda made his league debut against Atlético IbaÑÉs on 18 October 2020.

=== First spell at CRAC ===
Duda made his league debut against Atlético Goianiense on 26 January 2022. He scored his first goal for the club against Goitatuba EC on 9 February 2022, scoring in the 89th minute.

=== Bahia de Feira ===
Duda made his league debut against Caldense on 1 May 2022.

=== Second spell at CRAC ===
During his second spell with CRAC, he made his league debut against Iporá on 15 January 2023.

== Honours ==
=== Club ===
Juventude

- Semifinalist 2016
