= Hristo Popadiyn =

Bulgarian footballer (born 1994)

Hristo Popadiyn Христо Попадийн
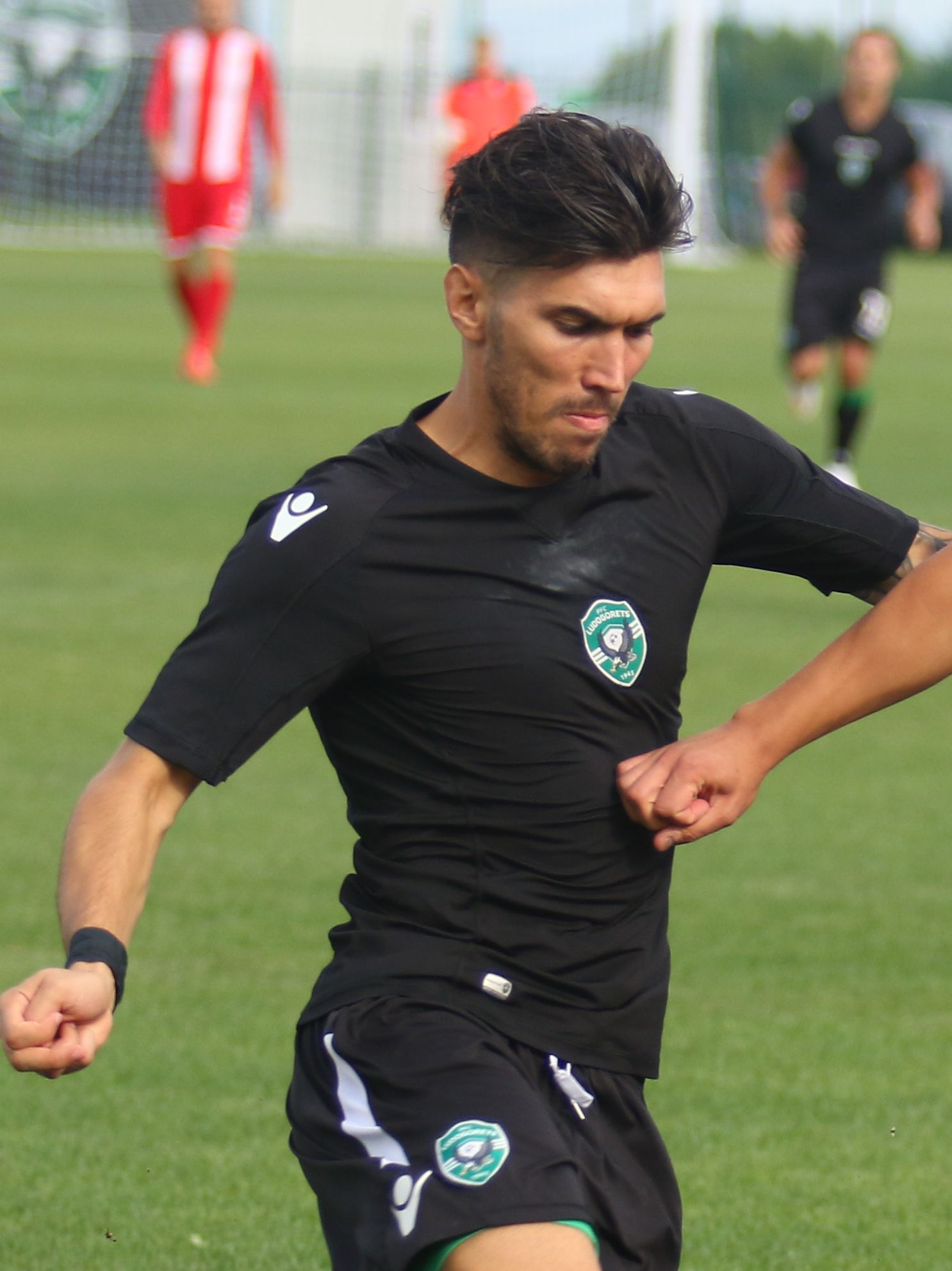
- Христо Попадийн

Personal information
- Full name: Hristo Hristov Popadiyn
- Date of birth: 6 January 1994 (age 32)
- Place of birth: Sofia, Bulgaria
- Height: 1.75 m (5 ft 9 in)
- Positions: Right back; centre back

Youth career
- –2014: Levski Sofia
- 2013: → Chievo Verona (loan)

Senior career*
Years	Team	Apps	(Gls)
2011–2014	Levski Sofia	0	(0)
2014	→ Vitosha Bistritsa (loan)	10	(0)
2014	Botev Vratsa	14	(0)
2015	Lokomotiv Mezdra	11	(0)
2015–2016	Ludogorets Razgrad II	22	(0)
2015–2016	Ludogorets Razgrad	2	(0)
2017	Vitosha Bistritsa	2	(0)
2017–2019	Dunav Ruse	41	(0)
2019–2020	Slavia Sofia	39	(1)
2021	Tsarsko Selo	27	(0)
2022–2023	Slavia Sofia	17	(0)
2023-2024	Pirin Blagoevgrad	26	(1)

International career
2010	Bulgaria U17	3	(0)
2011	Bulgaria U19	3	(0)
2015–2016	Bulgaria U21	6	(0)
- * Club domestic league appearances and goals as of 20 June 2024

Hristo Popadiyn (Bulgarian: Христо Попадийн; born 4 January 1994) is a Bulgarian professional footballer who plays as a defender.

== Career ==
=== Levski Sofia ===
Popadiyn began his career with Levski Sofia. In the beginning of 2013 he was sent on loan to the Italian Serie A team Chievo Verona until the end of the season. He returned to Levski for the 2013/14 season making his official debut for the club in a cup match against Pirin Gotse Delchev won by Levski with 0:5. He was sent on loan to Vitosha Bistritsa in the beginning of 2014 until the end of the season.

=== Botev and Lokomotiv ===
After his loan to Vitosha ended he left Levski and moved to Botev Vratsa. He made his debut for the team in a match against Dobrudzha on 2 August 2014. For the cup the team was drawn against the Bulgarian champions Ludogorets Razgrad and Popadiyn played in the match on 24 September 2014.

On 12 January 2015 Popadiyn moved to another team in the B Group, Lokomotiv 2012 Mezdra.

=== Ludogorets Razgrad ===
After receiving offers from teams from A Group he chose to move to the newly created second team of Ludogorets Razgrad. He made his debut for Ludogorets II on 25 July 2015 in a match against Dunav Ruse.

On 23 September 2015 he made his debut for the Ludogorets first team in the Bulgarian Cup in a 5–0 win over Lokomotiv 1929 Mezdra.

On 22 May 2016 he made his complete debut in A Group for Ludogorets in a match against Beroe Stara Zagora. On 7 September 2016 he became the third player after Ventsislav Kerchev and Yanaki Smirnov who joined Lokomotiv Gorna Aryahovitsa on loan until the end of the 2016–17 season, but 2 days later returned in Ludogorets.

On 9 November 2016, Popadiyn was released by Ludogorets.

=== Vitosha Bistritsa ===
In February 2017, following a few months without a club, Popadiyn joined Vitosha Bistritsa.

=== Dunav Ruse ===
On 6 June 2017 he signed a contract with Dunav Ruse.

=== Slavia Sofia ===
In January 2022, Popadiyn joined Slavia Sofia for the second time.

== Career statistics ==
=== Club ===
As of 14 July 2023

Club performance			League		Cup		Continental		Other		Total	
Club	League	Season	Apps	Goals	Apps	Goals	Apps	Goals	Apps	Goals	Apps	Goals
Bulgaria			League		Bulgarian Cup		Europe		Other (Note: Includes Bulgarian Supercup matches.)		Total	
Levski Sofia	A Group	2013–14	0	0	1	0	0	0	–		1	0
Vitosha Bistritsa (loan)	B Group	2013–14	10	0	0	0	–		–		10	0
Botev Vratsa	B Group	2014–15	14	0	1	0	–		–		15	0
Lokomotiv Mezdra	B Group	2014–15	11	0	0	0	–		–		11	0
Ludogorets Razgrad II	B Group	2015–16	15	0	–		–		–		15	0
Ludogorets Razgrad	A Group	2015–16	0	0	1	0	0	0	0	0	1	0
Career statistics			50	0	3	0	0	0	0	0	53	0
