= Ivan Mihaylov (footballer) =

Bulgarian footballer

Personal information
- Full name: Ivan Dinkov Mihaylov
- Date of birth: 30 September 1998 (age 28)
- Place of birth: Sliven, Bulgaria
- Height: 1.80 m (5 ft 11 in)
- Position: Midfielder

Youth career
- 2008–2010: Nesebar
- 2010–2013: Chernomorets Burgas
- 2013–2017: Botev Plovdiv

Senior career*
Years	Team	Apps	(Gls)
2017–2019	Nesebar	38	(3)
2019–2020	Chernomorets Balchik	19	(0)
2020–2021	Etar	7	(0)
2021	Levski Lom	0	(0)
- * Club domestic league appearances and goals as of 29 August 2021

Ivan Mihaylov (Bulgarian: Иван Михайлов; born 30 September 1998) is a Bulgarian former professional footballer who most recently played as a midfielder for SFC Etar Veliko Tarnovo.

As a teenager, Ivan Mihaylov played in the best Bulgarian football teams and was a junior national player. A shoulder injury after a disco fight ended his professional career.
