= Gradski stadion (Ruse) =

Stadium in Bulgaria

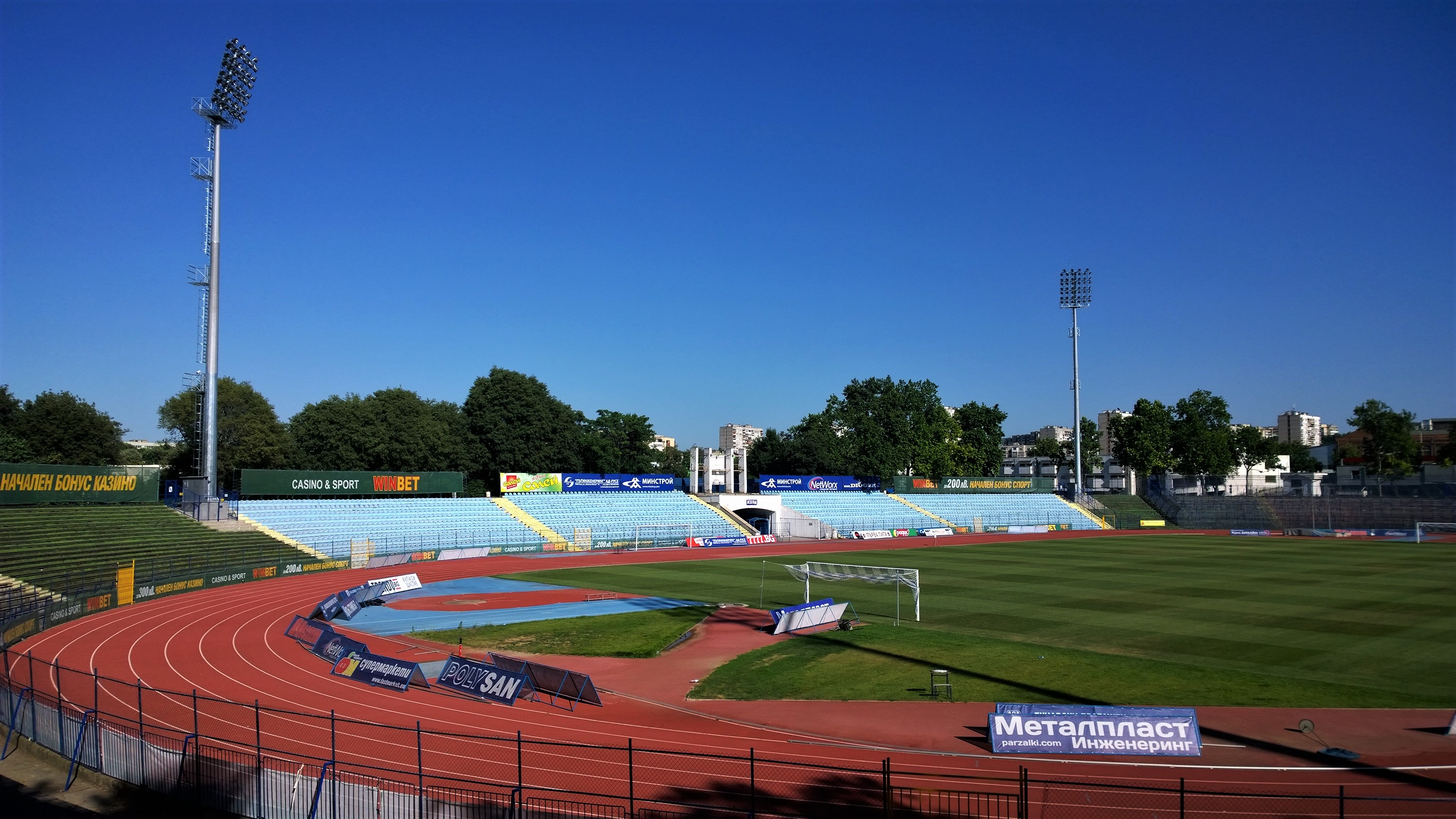
- Interactive map of Gradski stadion
- Location: Ruse, Bulgaria
- Coordinates: 43°50′53″N 25°57′47″E
- Owner: Municipality of Ruse
- Capacity: 13,000
- Surface: Grass

Construction
- Opened: 1910
- Renovated: 2013, 2017

Tenants
- Dunav Ruse (1949–present); Lokomotiv Ruse (2016–present)

Gradski stadion (Bulgarian: Градски стадион, lit. ''City Stadium'') is a multi-purpose stadium in Ruse, Bulgaria. It is used for football matches and concerts. It hosts the home games of Dunav Ruse and Lokomotiv Ruse. The stadium holds a capacity of 13,000 spectators, of which 2,000 places are designated for away fans.

== Renovations ==
=== 2013 ===
The stadium was renovated in early 2013, as navy-blue seats were put on the main seven sectors. In December, roof covers were added over the main stand.

=== 2017 ===
Following Dunav Ruse's promotion to Bulgarian First League in 2016, the stadium was renovated to meet the licensing criteria of the Bulgarian Football Union. A new drainage system and an automatic watering system were installed, the renovation also included replacing the grass surface of the stadium and constructing floodlights. On the 24th of April, the Bulgarian Football Union licensed the stadium. Prior to the event, Dunav played their home matches on Ludogorets Arena in Razgrad.
