= Daniel Pehlivanov =

Bulgarian footballer

Personal information
- Full name: Daniel Krasimirov Pehlivanov
- Date of birth: 1 July 1994 (age 32)
- Place of birth: Sandanski, Bulgaria
- Height: 1.78 m (5 ft 10 in)
- Position: Midfielder

Team information
- Current team: Vihren Sandanski
- Number: 11

Youth career
- –2014: Vihren Sandanski

Senior career*
Years	Team	Apps	(Gls)
2014–2016	Vihren Sandanski		
2016	Pirin Razlog	9	(0)
2016–2017	Septemvri Sofia	28	(9)
2017	Vihren Sandanski	29	(13)
2017-2018	Arda Kardzhali		
2018	Dunav Ruse	4	(0)
2019–2020	Hebar	19	(3)
2020	Etar	13	(0)
2021	Vihren Sandanski		
2021–2022	Levski Lom	12	(3)
2022	Belatsitsa	7	(3)
2022–2023	Montana	10	(1)
2023–	Vihren Sandanski	0	(0)
- * Club domestic league appearances and goals as of 8 January 2023

Daniel Krasimirov Pehlivanov (Bulgarian: Даниел Красимиров Пехливанов; born 1 July 1994) is a Bulgarian professional footballer who plays as a midfielder for Vihren Sandanski.

== Career ==
=== Dunav Ruse ===
On 18 June 2018 Pehlivanov signed a contract with the Bulgarian First League team Dunav Ruse. He made his professional debut for the team in the first league match of the season against Vitosha Bistritsa on 20 July 2018.
