= Miroslav Budinov =

Bulgarian footballer

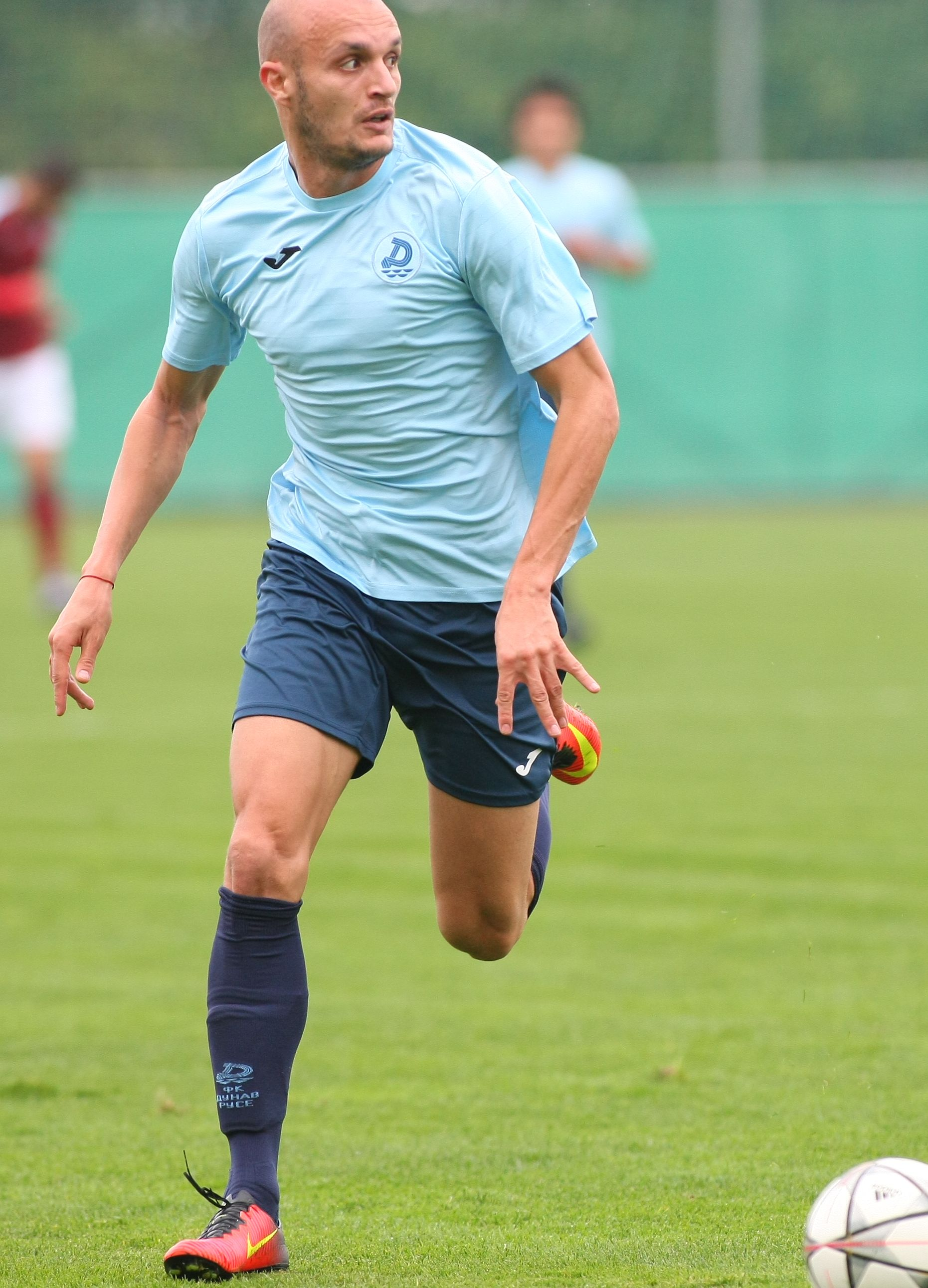

Personal information
- Full name: Miroslav Vladimirov Budinov
- Date of birth: 23 January 1986 (age 40)
- Place of birth: Sofia, Bulgaria
- Height: 1.90 m (6 ft 3 in)
- Position: Forward

Senior career*
Years	Team	Apps	(Gls)
2006–2008	Belite Orli Pleven	25	(12)
2008–2010	Akademik Sofia	57	(21)
2010–2011	Cherno More	3	(0)
2011–2012	Sportist Svoge	25	(4)
2012–2013	Lyubimets	34	(7)
2014	Ethnikos Gazoros	5	(1)
2014–2017	Dunav Ruse	109	(44)
2018	Septemvri Sofia	30	(2)
2019	Botev Vratsa	24	(4)
2020	Tsarsko Selo	25	(2)
2021	Minyor Pernik	10	(1)
2021–2022	Krumovgrad	23	(11)
2022–2024	Dunav Ruse	58	(21)
Total		428	(130)
- * Club domestic league appearances and goals

Miroslav Budinov (Bulgarian: Мирослав Будинов; born 23 January 1986) is a Bulgarian former professional footballer who played as a forward.
