= Branimir Kostadinov =

Bulgarian footballer

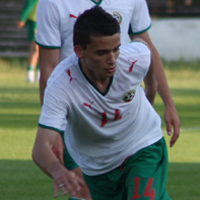

Personal information
- Full name: Branimir Petev Kostadinov
- Date of birth: 4 March 1989 (age 37)
- Place of birth: Veliko Tarnovo, Bulgaria
- Height: 1.80 m (5 ft 11 in)
- Positions: Winger; forward

Youth career
- –2004: Slavia Sofia
- 2004–2005: LASK Linz
- 2006–2009: Heart of Midlothian

Senior career*
| Years | Team | Apps | (Gls) |
| 2009–2011 | Chernomorets Burgas | 6 | (0) |
| 2009 | → Pomorie (loan) | 13 | (4) |
| 2010 | → Pomorie (loan) | 10 | (0) |
| 2011–2012 | Botev Vratsa | 26 | (4) |
| 2012 | → Tatran Prešov (loan) | 10 | (1) |
| 2013 | Lokomotiv Sofia | 18 | (1) |
| 2014 | Chernomorets Burgas | 8 | (0) |
| 2014–2015 | Lokomotiv Plovdiv | 12 | (0) |
| 2015–2018 | Dunav Ruse | 99 | (9) |
| 2019–2024 | Ludogorets Razgrad II | 141 | (17) |
| 2021 | Ludogorets Razgrad | 1 | (0) |
| Total | | 343 | (36) |

International career
| 2009 | Bulgaria U21 | 1 | (0) |
- * Club domestic league appearances and goals as of 12:57, 3 June 2024 (UTC)

Branimir Petev Kostadinov (Bulgarian: Бранимир Петев Костадинов; born 4 March 1989) is a retired Bulgarian footballer.

== Career ==
Branimir Kostadinov – Career Biography

Branimir Kostadinov began playing football in the youth development groups of Sofia-based Septemvri under the guidance of twin brothers Toni and Kiril Kirilovi. He subsequently joined the youth academy of PFC Slavia Sofia. In May 2004, he successfully completed a trial and moved to the youth team of LASK Linz in Austria, where he made 22 appearances and scored 19 goals.

Kostadinov scored three goals for the Bulgaria U17 national team in a 4–0 victory over Austria at the UEFA European Under-17 Championship. He attracted interest from Manchester City and Scottish club Hearts, while turning down a direct contract offer from French side RC Lens. Due to administrative restrictions in England, Manchester City were unable to sign the Bulgarian forward in November 2005. In January 2006, Kostadinov moved to Scotland.

He represented Hearts in the youth league, scoring 15 goals in 22 appearances. His performances earned him recognition from British sports broadcaster Sky Sports, which described him as one of Europe’s most promising young talents.

During the 2007–08 season, Kostadinov trained with the first team in Germany, where he scored his first goal in a 2–1 defeat against BV Cloppenburg. He subsequently featured for Hearts’ Under-17 side and reserve team during the 2007–08 period. He also made ten appearances in friendly matches with the first team, scoring three goals. On 10 March 2008, he was once again invited to train with Manchester City. However, the proposed transfer fell through due to administrative complications.

At the end of the 2008–09 season, Hearts were facing serious financial difficulties and mounting debts. As a result, the contracts of Kostadinov and all other continental European players at the Edinburgh club were terminated, forcing them to leave Scotland.

Kostadinov declined an offer from Swiss club AC Bellinzona and returned to Bulgaria, where he was invited by PSFC Chernomorets Burgas to undergo a trial. In a match for the reserve team at Lazur Stadium, he scored twice and provided two assists in a comprehensive 6–0 victory over Vihren Sandanski.

Just a few days later, on 20 June 2009, Kostadinov signed a three-year contract with PSFC Chernomorets Burgas.

In 2011, he joined Botev Vratsa, who had returned to Bulgaria’s top division after a 20-year absence. He signed a contract for one and a half years. Following a strong season in Vratsa, Kostadinov moved on loan to Slovak club Tatran Prešov for half a season, with an option for a permanent transfer.

After his loan spell ended, he returned to Bulgaria and terminated his contract with Botev Vratsa due to the club’s alleged contractual breaches. He subsequently joined Lokomotiv Sofia, signing a one-and-a-half-year contract. Under head coach Emil Velev, he established himself as a regular starter.

In 2014, Kostadinov and Lokomotiv Sofia mutually agreed to terminate his contract, and he returned to Chernomorets Burgas after three years away from the club. He signed a one-year deal but left after just six months due to outstanding unpaid wages.

He then joined the prestigious Plovdiv club Lokomotiv Plovdiv, where he spent one season. He played the full 90 minutes in one of the two quarter-final matches against city rivals Botev Plovdiv. Following a 1–1 draw at Lokomotiv Stadium and a 2–1 defeat at Komatevo, Lokomotiv Plovdiv progressed to the semi-finals on aggregate. Kostadinov was subsequently sidelined by injury for the following matches against Cherno More.

After leaving Lokomotiv Plovdiv and seeing a potential move abroad fall through, Kostadinov decided to join Dunav Ruse, who were leading Bulgaria’s second division at the time. The club had already played seven league matches when he signed a two-year contract.

Dunav Ruse subsequently secured promotion to the First Professional League, finishing ten points ahead of the runners-up in the Second League. The following season proved to be one of the most memorable in the club’s history, as Dunav finished fourth in the top division and qualified for the top six.

Kostadinov established himself as one of the team’s key players, finishing the season as the club’s second-highest scorer with eight goals and nine assists. He featured in memorable encounters against Ludogorets, scoring against the reigning champions in one of the matches.

In front of approximately 15,000 spectators, he scored twice against his former club Lokomotiv Plovdiv in Dunav’s first home match in Ruse in 25 years.

Dunav’s fourth-place finish earned the club a place in the qualifying rounds of the UEFA Europa League, where they faced Irtysh Pavlodar, managed by Dimitar Dimitrov, who had previously coached Kostadinov at Chernomorets Burgas. Although Dunav lost both legs, the team left a positive impression with its performances. Kostadinov played the full 90 minutes in both matches.

After four seasons with Dunav Ruse, Kostadinov left the club in an unexpected turn of events. In February 2019, a move to his boyhood club Slavia Sofia appeared almost certain but ultimately fell through. He remained without a club until the summer of that year.

In June 2019, Kostadinov received an offer from Ludogorets Razgrad, which he accepted despite the prospect of playing exclusively for the club’s reserve team in the Second Professional League. He embraced the opportunity to use his experience to support and mentor younger players.

He went on to be part of a historic season for Ludogorets II. During the first half of the 2020–21 season, the team came within one victory of reaching first place. In the second half of the campaign, they were involved in a fiercely contested battle for the bronze medals. Following two defeats, Ludogorets II finished fourth, recording the best league finish in the team’s history at that time.

Kostadinov finished the season strongly in attacking positions, scoring six goals in his final eight appearances. He scored seven goals in total during the campaign, despite playing primarily as a right-back in approximately 70% of the matches because the team lacked a specialist in that position.

He also made his debut for Ludogorets’ first team against CSKA 1948 Sofia, playing as a left-back. He completed the full 90 minutes and provided the assist for Ludogorets’ only goal, scored by Claudiu Keșerü, in a 3–1 defeat in Sofia.

Following this appearance, Kostadinov remained at Ludogorets, continuing to contribute his experience and leadership to the younger players in the reserve team.

Ludogorets II achieved another fourth-place finish in the 2022–23 season, ending the campaign just four points behind third place.

During the 2023–24 season, Kostadinov enjoyed another productive campaign, scoring six goals despite playing predominantly as either a left-back or right-back. In the final match of the season against Maritsa Plovdiv, who had already been relegated, he led his young teammates onto the pitch wearing the captain’s armband. Six players from Ludogorets’ third team made their professional football debuts in the match. The game ended 1–1, with Kostadinov scoring Ludogorets II’s goal from the penalty spot ten minutes before the final whistle.

After playing the first half of the 2024–25 season as a player-coach, Kostadinov made his final appearance as a professional footballer on 5 December 2024, against Lokomotiv Gorna Oryahovitsa.

Transition to Sports Performance Coaching

In 2025, Branimir Kostadinov began working as a strength and conditioning coach at the Ludogorets Academy, working across multiple age groups and subsequently taking on responsibilities with Ludogorets II, who compete in Bulgaria’s Second Professional League.

From the summer of 2026, he became part of Ludogorets’ first-team staff, working alongside English strength and conditioning coach John Phillips.

His transition from professional footballer to strength and conditioning coach reflects his commitment to the development of young players and his desire to pass on the knowledge and experience gained throughout his playing career.

== International career ==
Kostadinov was a part of the Bulgaria U19 at the 2008 European Under-19 Championship in Czech Republic.
