= Bozhidar Vasev =

Bulgarian footballer

Bozhidar Vasev Божидар Васев
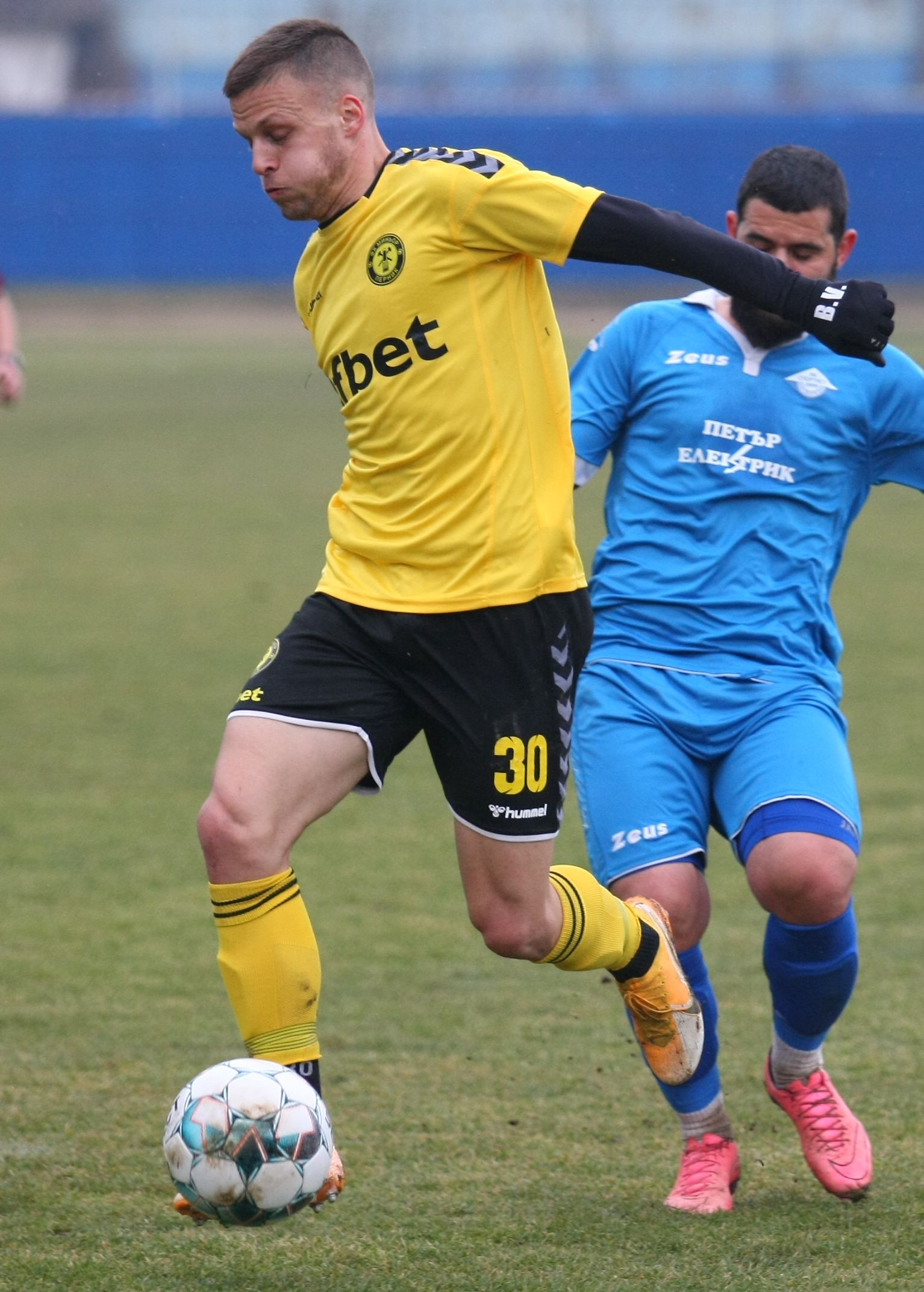

Personal information
- Full name: Bozhidar Yuriev Vasev
- Date of birth: 14 March 1993 (age 33)
- Place of birth: Pernik, Bulgaria
- Height: 1.80 m (5 ft 11 in)
- Position: Central midfielder

Team information
- Current team: Germanea Sapareva Banya
- Number: 10

Youth career
- Slavia Sofia

Senior career*
Years	Team	Apps	(Gls)
2011–2012	Slavia Sofia	3	(0)
2012	→ Pomorie (loan)	6	(0)
2012	Septemvri Simitli	10	(1)
2013	Pirin Blagoevgrad	15	(3)
2013–2016	Botev Plovdiv	51	(4)
2013–2014	→ Rakovski (loan)	13	(1)
2016–2017	Slavia Sofia	28	(4)
2017	Hapoel Acre	0	(0)
2017–2019	Dunav Ruse	47	(4)
2019–2020	Hebar	16	(0)
2020	Tsarsko Selo	12	(1)
2021–2022	Minyor Pernik	45	(21)
2022–2024	Spartak Varna	23	(2)
2024	Minyor Pernik	0	(0)
2024–	Germanea Sapareva Banya		

International career
2013–2014	Bulgaria U21	6	(0)
- * Club domestic league appearances and goals

Bozhidar Vasev (Bulgarian: Божидар Васев; born 14 March 1993) is a Bulgarian former professional footballer who played as a midfielder for Germanea Sapareva Banya.

== Career ==
=== Botev Plovdiv ===
Vasev signed a contract with Botev Plovdiv in July 2013 and soon after that he was loaded the Rakovski.

Vasev returned to Botev Plovdiv for season 2014-15 and became part of the first team. The manager Velislav Vutsov decided to use him on a new position as a left-back.

==== 2014-15 ====
In December 2014 Velislav Vutsov was replaced by Petar Penchev. The new manager returned Vasev to his favorite position in the midfield. On 10 March 2015 Bozhidar scored his first goal in A Grupa during the 0–2 away win over the local rivals Lokomotiv Plovdiv.

==== 2015-16 ====
On 29 August 2015 Vasev scored a goal for the 2–1 victory over Cherno More Varna.

Two months later, on 23 October, Vasev has sent off only 5 minutes after replacing the injured Orlin Starokin. Vasev received a yellow card during the substitution for coming on the pitch without a permission from the referee. Soon after that he committed a foul and was sent off. Immediately after the game Vasev was fined, although that his team achieved 1–0 win over Pirin Blagoevgrad. After missing a match due to a ban, on 30 October, Vasev returned in the starting lineup for the away game with Slavia Sofia. In the 80th minute Slavia Sofia scored a goal after Vasev's terrible mistake, while two minutes later they scored the second goal for their 2–0 home win.

=== Hapoel Acre ===
In June 2017, Vasev joined Pirin Blagoevgrad but did not sign a professional contract because of the club's financial problems. On 6 July, he signed for 1+1 years with Israeli side Hapoel Acre.

=== Dunav Ruse ===
On 5 September 2017, Vasev signed a two-year contract with Dunav Ruse, where he joined his brother Andreas.

=== Spartak Varna ===
After 2 seasons with Minyor Pernik and becoming the top goalscorer in 2021-22 for the team, Vasev moved to the newly promoted to First League team Spartak Varna, signing a 3-years long contract.

== Personal life ==
Bozhidar Vasev is son of the football coach Yuri Vasev. His brother Andreas Vasev is also a football player.

=== Stabbing ===
On 23 August 2011, Vasev was stabbed in the back by unknown attackers in downtown Sofia.
