= Georgi Dinkov =

Bulgarian footballer

Personal information
- Full name: Georgi Ivanov Dinkov
- Date of birth: 20 May 1991 (age 35)
- Place of birth: Gabrovo, Bulgaria
- Height: 1.86 m (6 ft 1 in)
- Positions: Centre-back; midfielder

Team information
- Current team: Yambol
- Number: 18

Youth career
- 1998–2010: Beroe Stara Zagora

Senior career*
Years	Team	Apps	(Gls)
2010–2018	Beroe Stara Zagora	96	(1)
2011	→ Spartak Varna (loan)	11	(2)
2012	→ Sliven 2000 (loan)	8	(0)
2018–2019	Dunav Ruse	35	(2)
2019–2020	Spartak Varna	11	(0)
2020–2023	Beroe Stara Zagora	34	(0)
2023–2024	Septemvri Sofia	25	(1)
2024–	Yambol	80	(18)
- * Club domestic league appearances and goals as of 31 October 2026

Georgi Dinkov (Bulgarian: Георги Динков; born 20 May 1991) is a Bulgarian footballer who plays as a centre-back.

== Honours ==
Beroe Stara Zagora

- Bulgarian Cup: 2013
- Bulgarian Supercup: 2013
