= Diyan Dimov =

Bulgarian footballer

Personal information
- Full name: Diyan Hristov Dimov
- Date of birth: 27 September 1985 (age 41)
- Place of birth: Ruse, Bulgaria
- Height: 1.91 m (6 ft 3 in)
- Position: Centre midfielder

Youth career
- Dunav Ruse

Senior career*
Years	Team	Apps	(Gls)
2004–2007	Dunav Ruse	36	(5)
2007–2009	Benkovski Byala	24	(8)
2009–2010	Dunav Ruse	26	(1)
2010–2011	Ludogorets	18	(3)
2011	Svetkavitsa	13	(0)
2012	Etar 1924	11	(0)
2012	Lyubimets	4	(0)
2013–2018	Dunav Ruse	158	(34)
2018	CSKA 1948	15	(1)
2019–2023	Dunav Ruse	51	(1)
- * Club domestic league appearances and goals

Diyan Hristov Dimov (Bulgarian: Диян Христов Димов; born 27 September 1985) is a Bulgarian former footballer who played as a midfielder.
