= Stilyan Nikolov =

Bulgarian footballer (born 1991)

Personal information
- Full name: Stilyan Petrov Nikolov
- Date of birth: 16 July 1991 (age 35)
- Place of birth: Bulgaria
- Position: Centre-back

Team information
- Current team: Kyustendil
- Number: 14

Senior career*
Years	Team	Apps	(Gls)
2010–2013	Chavdar Etropole	60	(1)
2013	Lyubimets 2007	12	(0)
2014	Slivnishki geroi	14	(3)
2014–2017	Pirin Blagoevgrad	105	(2)
2018–2020	Septemvri Sofia	36	(4)
2020–2022	Pirin Blagoevgrad	54	(4)
2022–2023	Beroe	14	(0)
2023	Montana	17	(1)
2023–2024	Dobrudzha	31	(2)
2024–	Kyustendil	2	(0)
- * Club domestic league appearances and goals as of 12 August 2024

Stilyan Nikolov (Bulgarian: Стилян Николов; born 16 July 1991) is a Bulgarian professional footballer who plays as a centre-back for Kyustendil.

In December 2017, Nikolov joined Septemvri Sofia.
