= Svilen Shterev =

Bulgarian footballer

Personal information
- Full name: Svilen Ignatov Shterev
- Date of birth: 14 December 1992 (age 33)
- Place of birth: Bulgaria
- Height: 1.78 m (5 ft 10 in)
- Position: Midfielder

Team information
- Current team: Sayana Haskovo
- Number: 7

Youth career
- Lokomotiv Plovdiv

Senior career*
Years	Team	Apps	(Gls)
2011–2012	Brestnik		
2012–2013	Pirin Gotse Delchev	9	(0)
2013–2014	Eurocollege		
2014–2016	Gigant Saedinenie	58	(24)
2016–2017	Oborishte	29	(2)
2017	Montana	4	(0)
2017–2018	Maritsa Plovdiv	23	(4)
2018	Botev Galabovo	16	(5)
2019–2020	Dunav Ruse	35	(2)
2020–2021	Etar	10	(1)
2021	Sileks	11	(2)
2021–	Sayana Haskovo	13	(7)
- * Club domestic league appearances and goals as of 10 December 2021

Svilen Shterev (Bulgarian: Свилен Щерев; born 14 December 1992) is a Bulgarian professional footballer who plays as a midfielder for Bulgarian Third League club Sayana Haskovo.

== Career ==
Shterev played for Oborishte Panagyurishte. On 24 June 2017, he signed a 2-year contract with Montana. On 6 September 2017, following the appointment of new manager Ferario Spasov, his contract was terminated by mutual consent.

On 8 September 2017, Shterev signed with Maritsa Plovdiv. He left the club at the end of the 2017–18 season following the relegation to Third League. On 2 July 2018, Shterev joined Botev Galabovo. In August 2021, Shterev signed with Sayana Haskovo.
