= Dragoș Firțulescu =

Romanian footballer

Personal information
- Full name: Dragoș Petruț Firțulescu
- Date of birth: 15 May 1989 (age 37)
- Place of birth: Craiova, Romania
- Height: 1.75 m (5 ft 9 in)
- Position: Left midfielder

Team information
- Current team: Malappuram FC (assistant coach)

Youth career
- FCU Craiova

Senior career*
| Years | Team | Apps | (Gls) |
| 2006–2011 | FC U Craiova | 46 | (1) |
| 2007–2008 | → Caracal (loan) | 30 | (10) |
| 2009 | → Jiul Petroșani (loan) | | |
| 2011–2012 | Alki Larnaca | 6 | (1) |
| 2012 | Târgu Mureș | 7 | (0) |
| 2012–2013 | Universitatea Cluj | | |
| 2013 | Slatina | 10 | (1) |
| 2013–2014 | UTA Arad | 14 | (0) |
| 2014 | Kaposvár | 13 | (0) |
| 2014 | Dinamo București | | |
| 2015–2016 | Râmnicu Vâlcea | 35 | (5) |
| 2017 | Pandurii Târgu Jiu | 17 | (1) |
| 2017–2018 | Beroe | 18 | (0) |
| 2019 | Dunav Ruse | 11 | (3) |
| 2019–2020 | Chennaiyin | 16 | (0) |
| 2020–2021 | Slavia Sofia | | |
| 2021 | Dobrudzha Dobrich | 6 | (0) |
| 2022 | Astra Giurgiu | 7 | (2) |
| 2022–2024 | Lokomotiv Ruse | 12 | (2) |

International career
| 2009–2010 | Romania U21 | 2 | (0) |
- * Club domestic league appearances and goals

Dragoș Petruț Firțulescu (born 15 May 1989) is a Romanian retired professional footballer who played as a left midfielder. He is currently assistant coach for Malappuram FC.
