= 2017–18 PFC Cherno More Varna season =

Cherno More
2017–18 season
- Chairman: Marin Marinov
- Manager: Georgi Ivanov (until 21 September); Emanuel Lukanov (caretaker) (21 September – 28 December); Ilian Iliev (from 28 December)
- First League: 7th
- Bulgarian Cup: First round (knocked out by Montana)
- Top goalscorer: League: Mariyan Ognyanov, Radoslav Vasilev & Georgi Iliev (6); All: Mariyan Ognyanov, Radoslav Vasilev & Georgi Iliev (6)
- Highest home attendance: 6,500 (vs. CSKA Sofia, 16 September 2017)
- Lowest home attendance: 250 (vs. Vitosha Bistritsa, 15 July 2017)
- Average home league attendance: 1,692
- Biggest win: 4–0 (vs Vereya, 21 July 2017)
- Biggest defeat: 1–4 (vs Septemvri Sofia, 27 August 2017); 1–4 (vs Beroe, 17 February 2018); 1–4 (vs Levski Sofia, 24 May 2018)
Home colours	Away colours	Third colours
- All statistics correct as of 24 May 2018.

This page covers all relevant details regarding Cherno More for all official competitions inside the 2017–18 season. These are the First Professional Football League and the Bulgarian Cup.

Due to the ongoing repair works at Ticha Stadium, the team played its first home league game at Kavarna Stadium in Kavarna.

On 21 September 2017, following a streak of poor results and Bulgarian Cup elimination by Montana, manager Georgi Ivanov resigned. Assistant coach Emanuel Lukanov was immediately appointed as caretaker manager. As results didn't improve, on 28 December he was replaced with Ilian Iliev, his second tenure as Cherno More manager.

== Transfers ==
=== In ===
Date	Pos.	Name	From	Fee
14 June 2017	MF	(Bulgaria) Atanas Zehirov	Beroe	Free
14 June 2017	MF	(Bulgaria) Orlin Starokin	Pirin Blagoevgrad	Free
14 June 2017	MF	(Bulgaria) Mariyan Ognyanov	Neftochimic	Free
14 June 2017	FW	(Bulgaria) Georgi Bozhilov	Beroe	Free
15 June 2017	DF	(Algeria) Ilias Hassani	Vereya	Free
16 June 2017	DF	(Portugal) Vitinha	Ludogorets Razgrad	Free
18 June 2017	DF	(Bulgaria) Aleksandar Aleksandrov	Levski Sofia	Free
19 June 2017	FW	(Bulgaria) Tsvetelin Chunchukov	Ludogorets Razgrad	Free
15 August 2017	GK	(Ukraine) Yevhen Borovyk	(Ukraine) Karpaty Lviv	Free
12 September 2017	DF	(Bulgaria) Iliya Milanov	Neftochimic	Free
12 September 2017	FW	(France) Amadou Soukouna	Levski Sofia	Free
12 October 2017	MF	(Bulgaria) Anton Ognyanov	Levski Sofia	Free
18 December 2017	GK	(Bulgaria) Blagoy Makendzhiev	Pirin Blagoevgrad	Free
8 January 2018	MF	(Algeria) Mehdi Fennouche	Vereya	Free
8 January 2018	MF	(Democratic Republic of the Congo) Aristote N'Dongala	Lokomotiv GO	Free
12 January 2018	MF	(Bulgaria) Petar Vitanov	Vereya	Free
16 January 2018	MF	(Bulgaria) Dani Kiki	Lokomotiv Plovdiv	Free
16 January 2018	DF	(Bulgaria) Miroslav Enchev	Vereya	Undisclosed
5 February 2018	FW	(Bulgaria) Radoslav Vasilev	(Cyprus) Alki Oroklini	Free
5 February 2018	DF	(Republic of the Congo) Hugo Konongo	(France) Paulhan-Pézenas	Free
13 February 2018	DF	(Bulgaria) Daniel Dimov	(Turkey) Manisaspor	Free
19 April 2018	MF	(Portugal) Fábinho	(Portugal) Sporting B	Free

=== Out ===
Date	Pos.	Name	To	Fee
12 May 2017	DF	(Bulgaria) Trayan Trayanov	Septemvri Sofia	Free
29 May 2017	GK	(Czech Republic) Vojtěch Šrom	(Czech Republic) Opava	Free
29 May 2017	DF	(Bulgaria) Mihail Venkov	Slavia Sofia	Free
29 May 2017	DF	(Bulgaria) Plamen Nikolov	Lokomotiv Plovdiv	Free
29 May 2017	MF	(Bulgaria) Daniel Georgiev	Septemvri Sofia	Free
29 May 2017	MF	(Bulgaria) Todor Palankov	Pirin Blagoevgrad	Free
29 May 2017	MF	(Czech Republic) Filip Hlúpik	(Finland) Mariehamn	Free
29 May 2017	MF	(Spain) Pirulo	Free agent	Released
29 May 2017	FW	(The Gambia) Bacari	Free agent	Released
31 July 2017	MF	(Bulgaria) Ilian Iliev	(Portugal) Académica de Coimbra U19	Free
22 August 2017	MF	(Bulgaria) Borislav Baldzhiyski	Montana	Free
6 September 2017	MF	(Bulgaria) Ivan Kokonov	Montana	Free
6 December 2017	GK	(Ukraine) Yevhen Borovyk	(Kazakhstan) Akzhayik	Free
9 December 2017	FW	(France) Amadou Soukouna	Free agent	Released
12 December 2017	MF	(Bulgaria) Anton Ognyanov	Vereya	Free
14 December 2017	FW	(Bulgaria) Tsvetelin Chunchukov	Slavia Sofia	Free
14 December 2017	DF	(Bulgaria) Aleksandar Aleksandrov	Free agent	Released
15 December 2017	GK	(Bulgaria) Emil Mihaylov	CSKA 1948	Free
8 January 2018	MF	(Bulgaria) Orlin Starokin	Vitosha Bistritsa	Free
8 January 2018	DF	(Czech Republic) Ondřej Sukup	(Czech Republic) Zbrojovka Brno	Free
27 January 2018	DF	(Bulgaria) Iliya Milanov	Free agent	End of contract

=== Loans out ===
Date	Pos.	Name	To	End date	Fee
17 June 2017	FW	(Bulgaria) Valentin Yoskov	Nesebar	End of season	Free

== Squad information ==
N	Pos.	Nat.	Name	Age	EU	Since	App	Goals	Ends	Transfer fee	Previous Club	Notes
3	RB	(Bulgaria)	Ertan Tombak	18	EU	2017	4	0	2019	Youth system	Cherno More Academy	
5	RB	(Bulgaria)	Stefan Stanchev	29	EU	2013	101	1	2018	Free	Minyor Pernik	
6	CM	(Bulgaria)	~~Aleksandar Tsvetkov~~	27	EU	2016	57	2	2018	Free	Litex	(Note: Player left the club in May 2018.)
7	LB	(Portugal)	Vitinha	32	EU	2017	1	0	2019	Free	Ludogorets Razgrad	
8	CM	(Bulgaria)	Emil Yanchev	19	EU	2017	11	0	2019	Youth system	Cherno More Academy	
9	FW	(Bulgaria)	~~Tsvetelin Chunchukov~~	22	EU	2017	9	1	2019	Free	Ludogorets Razgrad	(Note: Player left the club in December 2017.)
9	LW	(Algeria)	Mehdi Fennouche	25	EU	2018	13	4	2019	Free	Vereya	
10	AM	(Bulgaria)	~~Ilian Iliev~~	17	EU	2016	3	0		Youth system	Cherno More Academy	(Note: Player left the club in July 2017.)
10	FW	(Bulgaria)	Radoslav Vasilev	27	EU	2018	16	6	2019	Free	(Cyprus) Alki Oroklini	
11	FW	(France)	~~Amadou Soukouna~~	25	EU	2017	8	0	2019	Free	Levski Sofia	
13	LW	(Bulgaria)	~~Ivan Kokonov~~	26	EU	2016	93	11	2019	Free	Montana	(Note: Kokonov made 56 appearances and scored 8 goals during his first spell at the club between 2013 and 2015.) (Note: Player left the club in September 2017.)
14	FW	(Bulgaria)	Georgi Bozhilov	31	EU	2017	159	22	2019	Free	Beroe	(Note: Bozhilov made 139 appearances and scored 19 goals during his first spell at the club between 2010 and 2015.)
15	CB	(Bulgaria)	~~Aleksandar Aleksandrov~~	31	EU	2017	231	5	2019	Free	Levski Sofia	(Note: Aleksandrov made 217 appearances and scored 5 goals during his first spell at the club between 2005 and 2013.)
16	DM	(Bulgaria)	Petar Vitanov	23	EU	2018	14	0	2019	Free	Vereya	
17	RB	(Bulgaria)	Martin Kostadinov	22	EU	2014	36	1	2020	Youth system	Cherno More Academy	
18	RW	(Bulgaria)	Atanas Zehirov	29	EU	2017	32	2	2019	Free	Beroe	
19	CB	(Bulgaria)	~~Iliya Milanov~~	25	EU	2017	7	0	2019	Free	Neftochimic	(Note: Player left the club in January 2018.)
21	CM	(Bulgaria)	Georgi Iliev (captain)	36	EU	2016	287	61	2018	Free	(China) Shijiazhuang Ever Bright	(Note: G. Iliev made 207 appearances and scored 48 goals during his first two spells at the club between 2000–2003 and 2008–2013.)
22	AM	(Bulgaria)	Mariyan Ognyanov	29	EU	2017	24	6	2019	Free	Neftochimic	
23	CB	(Algeria)	Ilias Hassani	22	EU	2017	32	1	2019	Free	Vereya	
25	GK	(Bulgaria)	Ivan Dyulgerov	18	EU	2016	4	0	2019	Youth system	Cherno More Academy	
26	GK	(Bulgaria)	Ivan Dichevski	17	EU	2017	0	0		Youth system	Cherno More Academy	
27	CB	(Bulgaria)	Daniel Dimov	29	EU	2018	70	4	2018	Free	(Turkey) Manisaspor	(Note: Dimov made 54 appearances and scored 3 goals during his first spell at the club between 2006 and 2010.)
29	FW	(Slovakia)	Marek Kuzma	29	EU	2016	63	13	2018	Free	(Slovakia) Zlaté Moravce	
33	GK	(Bulgaria)	~~Emil Mihaylov~~	29	EU	2016	32	0	2018	Free	Etar	(Note: E. Mihaylov made 3 appearances during his first spell at the club in 2013.)
33	CB	(Bulgaria)	Miroslav Enchev	26	EU	2018	6	0	2019	Undisclosed	Vereya	
36	AM	(Bulgaria)	Rumen Kasabov	18	EU	2017	1	1		Youth system	Cherno More Academy	
37	CM	(Bulgaria)	Lachezar Yordanov	17	EU	2018	1	0		Youth system	Cherno More Academy	
38	LW	(Democratic Republic of the Congo)	Aristote N'Dongala	24	EU	2018	8	0	2019	Free	Lokomotiv GO	
41	LB	(Republic of the Congo)	Hugo Konongo	26	EU	2018	13	0	2019	Free	(France) Paulhan-Pézenas	
45	CM	(Portugal)	Fábinho	22	EU	2018	6	0	2018	Free	(Portugal) Sporting B	
66	DM	(Bulgaria)	~~Orlin Starokin~~	31	EU	2017	16	2	2019	Free	Pirin Blagoevgrad	
70	AM	(Bulgaria)	~~Borislav Baldzhiyski~~	26	EU	2017	18	1	2018	Free	Slavia Sofia	(Note: Player left the club in August 2017.)
73	RB	(Czech Republic)	~~Ondřej Sukup~~	29	EU	2016	54	1	2019	Free	(Czech Republic) Baník Ostrava	
77	GK	(Ukraine)	~~Yevhen Borovyk~~	32	Non-EU	2017	3	0	2019	Free	(Ukraine) Karpaty Lviv	
81	LW	(Bulgaria)	~~Anton Ognyanov~~	29	EU	2017	8	1	2018	Free	Levski Sofia	
88	GK	(Bulgaria)	Blagoy Makendzhiev	29	EU	2018	15	0	2020	Free	Pirin Blagoevgrad	
90	FW	(Bulgaria)	Martin Minchev	17	EU	2017	26	2	2020	Youth system	Cherno More Academy	
97	RW	(Bulgaria)	Nikolay Minkov	20	EU	2016	25	1	2018	Youth system	Cherno More Academy	
98	FW	(Bulgaria)	Valentin Yoskov	19	EU	2015	21	0	2018	Youth system	Cherno More Academy	(Note: On loan at Nesebar for the entire season.)
99	AM	(Bulgaria)	Dani Kiki	30	EU	2018	9	1	2019	Free	Lokomotiv Plovdiv	

- Last updated: 24 May 2018

== Competitions ==
=== Overall ===
==== Competition record ====
Competition	Started round	Current position/round	Final position/round	First match	Last match	Record							
Competition	Started round	Current position/round	Final position/round	First match	Last match	P	W	D	L	GF	GA	GD	Win %
First League	—	—	7th	15 July 2017	24 May 2018	37	14	8	15	42	44	−2	37.84
Bulgarian Cup	First round	—	First round	20 September 2017		1	0	0	1	1	2	−1	0.00
Total						38	14	8	16	43	46	−3	36.84

Updated to match played 24 May 2018
Source: Competitions

==== Summary ====
Clean sheets	11 (11 First League)
Yellow cards	89 (86 First League, 3 Bulgarian Cup)
Red cards	2 (2 First League)
Worst discipline	(Algeria) Ilias Hassani (12 (yellow card) , 1 (red card) )
Biggest Win	4–0 vs Vereya (A)
Biggest Defeat	1–4 vs Septemvri Sofia (H), Beroe (H), Levski Sofia (A)
Most appearances	(Bulgaria) Georgi Iliev (36)
Top scorer	(Bulgaria) Mariyan Ognyanov, (Bulgaria) Radoslav Vasilev, (Bulgaria) Georgi Iliev (6)

Correct as of match played on 24 May 2018.

=== Pre-season and friendlies ===
As of 16 June 2017, Cherno More have announced 5 pre-season friendlies against Levski Sofia, Beroe, Septemvri Sofia, Bnei Yehuda and Dunărea Călărași. The Israeli club replaced the initially announced Sozopol. The final summer pre-season friendly was supposed to be against Dobrudzha Dobrich but they refused to participate due to organizational issues and were replaced by the Romanian club. On 14 December 2017, the club announced the final two friendlies for the winter pre-season, against Ludogorets Razgrad II and Pomorie. The first winter pre-season match was announced a week later. On 7 January 2018, the full schedule of the winter pre-season was announced, with 5 friendlies on Turkish soil: against Krylia Sovetov on 24 January, Lokomotiv Tashkent on 29 January, and Pyunik on 31 January. Two more friendlies remained to be arranged. They were announced on 17 January, encounters with Tirana on 23 January and Dunărea Călărași on 31 January. Subsequently, the friendly against the Armenian club was rearranged with Tosno. On 21 March, another friendly was arranged during the international break, against Chernomorets Balchik.

20 June 2017 Friendly	Levski Sofia	0–1	Cherno More	Pravets
17:00 EEST		Report	Kokonov 53'	Stadium: Gradski

23 June 2017 Friendly	Beroe	2–2	Cherno More	Razlog
18:30 EEST	Raynov 52' (pen.); Tsonev 70'	Report	Chunchukov 23' (pen.); G. Iliev 39'	Stadium: Gradski

27 June 2017 Friendly	Septemvri Sofia	0–2	Cherno More	Razlog
18:30 EEST		Report	Chunchukov 67'; Minkov 80'	Stadium: Gradski

30 June 2017 Friendly	Bnei Yehuda (Israel)	3–2	(Bulgaria) Cherno More	Sofia
18:00 EEST	56'; 67'; 83'	Report	Kuzma 70'; Kokonov 87'	Stadium: Boyana National Football Complex

8 July 2017 Friendly	Cherno More (Bulgaria)	3–1	(Romania) Dunărea Călărași	Varna
18:30 EEST	Chunchukov 30', 54'; Zehirov 56'	Report	Draghiceanu 83'	Stadium: Mladost

17 January 2018 Friendly	Cherno More	2–0	Chernomorets Balchik	Varna
11:30 EET	Yordanov 36'; N'Dongala 71'	Report		Stadium: Mladost

23 January 2018 Friendly	Tirana (Albania)	0–0	(Bulgaria) Cherno More	Belek, Turkey
15:30 FET		Report		Stadium: Susesi Complex

24 January 2018 Friendly	Krylia Sovetov (Russia)	4–0	(Bulgaria) Cherno More	Belek, Turkey
17:00 FET	Chochiyev 6'; Tkachuk 18', 20'; Samodin 42'	Report		Stadium: Susesi Complex

29 January 2018 Friendly	Lokomotiv Tashkent (Uzbekistan)	0–0	(Bulgaria) Cherno More	Antalya, Turkey
16:30 FET		Report

31 January 2018 Friendly	Dunărea Călărași (Romania)	3–2	(Bulgaria) Cherno More	Belek, Turkey
11:00 FET	Drăghiceanu 38'; Alexandru 43' (pen.), 48'	Report	Kuzma 6'; Kasabov 79'	Stadium: Sisesi Complex

31 January 2018 Friendly	Tosno (Russia)	0–1	(Bulgaria) Cherno More	Belek, Turkey
17:00 FET		Report	Fennouche 34'	Stadium: Sisesi Complex

7 February 2018 Friendly	Cherno More	1–4	Ludogorets Razgrad II	Varna
15:00 EET	Fennouche 28'	Report	Ts. Petrov 4'; Tsvyatkov 20', 22' (pen.); Milkov 63'	Stadium: Mladost

10 February 2018 Friendly	Cherno More	2–0	Pomorie	Varna
16:30 EET	M. Ognyanov 29'; Minchev 80'	Report		Stadium: Ticha

23 March 2018 Friendly	Cherno More	4–0	Chernomorets Balchik	Varna
11:30 EET	Zehirov 73'; Minchev 78', 85'; Vutsov 90'	Report		Stadium: Mladost

=== First Professional League ===
==== Regular season ====
===== Matches =====
15 July 2017 1	Cherno More	1–0	Vitosha Bistritsa	Kavarna
18:45 EEST	G. Iliev (yellow card) 59'; Bozhilov 63'; Mihaylov (yellow card) 90+1'; Minkov (yellow card) 90+2'	Report	Gyonov (yellow card) 54'	Stadium: Kavarna; Attendance: 250; Referee: Stanislav Todorov (Shumen); Man of the Match: Georgi Bozhilov

21 July 2017 2	Vereya	0–4	Cherno More	Stara Zagora
18:45 EEST	Bengyuzov (yellow card) 62'	Report	Sukup 4'; Sukup (yellow card) 8'; M. Ognyanov 28', 77'; Hassani (yellow card) 47'; Chunchukov (yellow card) 76'; Chunchukov 82'	Stadium: Trace Arena; Attendance: 370; Referee: Angel Bayaltsaliev (Sofia); Man of the Match: Mariyan Ognyanov

28 July 2017 3	Cherno More	1–0	Dunav Ruse	Varna
18:15 EEST	Hassani 65'; Mihaylov (yellow card) 89'; Sukup (yellow card) 90'; Zehirov (yellow card) 90+2'	Report	Milchev (yellow card) 44'; Karagaren (yellow card) 59'	Stadium: Ticha; Attendance: 2,480; Referee: Angel Angelov (Sofia); Man of the Match: Martin Kostadinov

4 August 2017 4	Pirin Blagoevgrad	1–1	Cherno More	Blagoevgrad
21:00 EEST	Nichev (yellow card) 33'; Blagov (yellow card) 40'; S. Kostov (yellow card) 45+2'; Popev (yellow card) 78'; Popev 81'; Palankov (yellow card) 84'	Report	Chunchukov (yellow card) 27'; Bozhilov 35'; Hassani (yellow card) 64'	Stadium: Hristo Botev; Attendance: 950; Referee: Petar Dorovski (Sofia); Man of the Match: Martin Kostadinov

11 August 2017 5	Cherno More	1–1	Slavia Sofia	Varna
18:15 EEST	Hassani (yellow card) 27'; Zehirov 38'; Baldzhiyski (yellow card) 78'	Report	Velev (yellow card) 16'; Yomov 72'; Yomov (yellow card) 86'; Petkov (yellow card) 88'	Stadium: Ticha; Attendance: 1,830; Referee: Nikola Popov (Sofia); Man of the Match: Atanas Zehirov

18 August 2017 6	Botev Plovdiv	1–2	Cherno More	Plovdiv
18:45 EEST	Dimov (yellow card) 25'; Stoyanov (yellow card) 38'; Petkov 69'; Baltanov (yellow card) 77'	Report	Kuzma (yellow card) 10'; Kuzma 22'; Starokin 35'	Stadium: Botev 1912 Football Complex; Attendance: 2,100; Referee: Ivaylo Stoyanov - the Wedding (Petrich); Man of the Match: Atanas Zehirov

27 August 2017 7	Cherno More	1–4	Septemvri Sofia	Varna
18:45 EEST	G. Iliev (yellow card) 31'; Hassani (red card) 54'; G. Iliev 65'; Starokin (yellow card) 74'	Report	Toshev 6', 81'; Gadi (yellow card) 43'; Galchev 56'; Galchev (yellow card) 78'; Ivanov (yellow card) 90+2'; Y. Georgiev (yellow card) 90+3'; Gadi 90+3'	Stadium: Ticha; Attendance: 1,630; Referee: Valentin Zhelezov (Burgas); Man of the Match: Boris Galchev

8 September 2017 8	Beroe	2–0	Cherno More	Stara Zagora
17:30 EEST	Eugénio 3'; Kamburov 45'	Report	Kuzma (yellow card) 67'; Chunchukov (yellow card) 87'	Stadium: Beroe; Attendance: 810; Referee: Georgi Kabakov (Plovdiv); Man of the Match: Pedro Eugénio

16 September 2017 9	Cherno More	0–1	CSKA Sofia	Varna
20:00 EEST	Chunchukov (yellow card) 83' (yellow-red card) 84'; Borovyk (yellow card) 89'	Report	Karanga (yellow card) 6'; Bodurov (yellow card) 44'; Karanga 90+6'	Stadium: Ticha; Attendance: 6,500; Referee: Stefan Apostolov (Simitli); Man of the Match: Fernando Karanga

23 September 2017 10	Cherno More	0–0	Etar	Varna
20:00 EEST		Report		Stadium: Ticha; Attendance: 1,650; Referee: Nikola Popov (Sofia); Man of the Match: Veselin Minev

1 October 2017 11	Levski Sofia	1–0	Cherno More	Sofia
17:30 EEST	Jablonský 12'	Report	Tsvetkov (yellow card) 32'; Hassani (yellow card) 50'; Milanov (yellow card) 55'	Stadium: Vivacom Arena - Georgi Asparuhov; Attendance: 1,700; Referee: Stanislav Todorov (Shumen); Man of the Match: David Jablonský

14 October 2017 12	Cherno More	0–1	Ludogorets Razgrad	Varna
20:00 EEST	Zehirov (yellow card) 27'; Milanov (yellow card) 52'; G. Iliev (yellow card) 60'; M. Ognyanov (yellow card) 87'	Report	Marcelinho 7'; João Paulo (yellow card) 38'; Wanderson (yellow card) 60'	Stadium: Ticha; Attendance: 3,980; Referee: Ivaylo Stoyanov - the Wedding (Petrich); Man of the Match: Marcelinho

21 October 2017 13	Lokomotiv Plovdiv	0–3	Cherno More	Plovdiv
20:15 EEST	Muhammed (yellow card) 61'; Frikeche (yellow card) 68'	Report	M. Ognyanov 4'; M. Ognyanov (yellow card) 54'; Hassani (yellow card) 55'; Starokin 60'; Tsvetkov (yellow card) 68'; A. Ognyanov 87'	Stadium: Lokomotiv; Attendance: 900; Referee: Stefan Apostolov (Simitli); Man of the Match: Georgi Iliev

27 October 2017 14	Vitosha Bistritsa	1–2	Cherno More	Bistritsa
16:30 EEST	Peev 45+1'	Report	M. Ognyanov 33', 55'; A. Ognyanov (yellow card) 60'; M. Ognyanov (yellow card) 81'	Stadium: Bistritsa; Attendance: 250; Referee: Georgi Kabakov (Plovdiv); Man of the Match: Mariyan Ognyanov

5 November 2017 15	Cherno More	1–2	Vereya	Varna
15:30 EET	G. Iliev 21'; Milanov (yellow card) 74'; Hassani (yellow card) 84'; Sukup (yellow card) 84'	Report	Enchev (yellow card) 30'; Bengyuzov 71'; Domovchiyski 75'; Kolev (yellow card) 82'; Yordanov (yellow card) 84'	Stadium: Ticha; Attendance: 780; Referee: Nikola Popov (Sofia); Man of the Match: Georgi Iliev

19 November 2017 16	Dunav Ruse	0–1	Cherno More	Ruse
12:30 EET	Dimov (yellow card) 62'; Marem (yellow card) 68'	Report	Karagaren 13' (o.g.); Aleksandrov (yellow card) 16'; Hassani (yellow card) 43'	Stadium: Gradski; Attendance: 880; Referee: Stanislav Todorov (Shumen); Man of the Match: Mariyan Ognyanov

24 November 2017 17	Cherno More	0–1	Pirin Blagoevgrad	Varna
17:30 EET		Report	Nikolov (yellow card) 26'; Palankov (yellow card) 58'; Kostadinov (yellow card) 89'; Henderson 90+4'	Stadium: Ticha; Attendance: 610; Referee: Nedelcho Gadzhalov (Plovdiv); Man of the Match: Stilyan Nikolov

28 November 2017 18	Slavia Sofia	2–0	Cherno More	Sofia
15:00 EET	Burov (yellow card) 17'; Hristov (yellow card) 32'; Martinov (yellow card) 35'; Minchev 45'; Ivanov 83'	Report	Zehirov (yellow card) 30'; G. Iliev (yellow card) 72'	Stadium: Vasil Levski; Attendance: 40; Referee: Georgi Kabakov (Plovdiv); Man of the Match: Ivan Minchev

2 December 2017 19	Cherno More	0–0	Botev Plovdiv	Varna
15:00 EET	Hassani (yellow card) 4'; Milanov (yellow card) 67'; Kuzma (yellow card) 74'; Stanchev (yellow card) 77'; Tombak (yellow card) 90+3'	Report	N'Dongala (yellow card) 29'; Baltanov (yellow card) 34'; Dimov (yellow card) 45+1'; Gustavo (yellow card) 70'; Čvorović (yellow card) 74'; Tasev (yellow card) 80'	Stadium: Ticha; Attendance: 780; Referee: Nikolay Yordanov (Sofia); Man of the Match: Aleksandar Aleksandrov

8 December 2017 20	Septemvri Sofia	2–1	Cherno More	Sofia
17:30 EET	Toshev 35', 67'; Dyakov (yellow card) 66'; Sandanski (yellow card) 74'; Genchev (yellow card) 76'	Report	Hassani (yellow card) 37'; G. Iliev 52'; Zehirov (yellow card) 75'	Stadium: Vasil Levski; Attendance: 30; Referee: Stanislav Todorov (Shumen); Man of the Match: Martin Toshev

17 February 2018 21	Cherno More	1–4	Beroe	Varna
17:30 EET	Vasilev 5'; Vitanov (yellow card) 59'; Fennouche (yellow card) 69'	Report	Leoni (yellow card) 11'; Eugénio 26', 38', 44'; Hadzhiev (yellow card) 35'; Bandalovski (yellow card) 76'; Kamburov 90+1'	Stadium: Ticha; Attendance: 1,380; Referee: Stefan Apostolov (Simitli); Man of the Match: Pedro Eugénio

23 February 2018 22	CSKA Sofia	0–0	Cherno More	Sofia
17:30 EET	Tiago (yellow card) 63'	Report	Dimov (yellow card) 29'; Kuzma (yellow card) 62'; Makendzhiev (yellow card) 90+3'	Stadium: Balgarska Armia; Attendance: 1,900; Referee: Angel Angelov (Sofia); Man of the Match: Blagoy Makendzhiev

3 March 2018 23	Etar	1–1	Cherno More	Veliko Tarnovo
12:30 EET	Badará 1'; Galabov (yellow card) 40'; Pashov (yellow card) 68'; Badará (red card) 69'	Report	M. Ognyanov 70' (pen.)	Stadium: Ivaylo; Attendance: 550; Referee: Valentin Zhelezov (Burgas); Man of the Match: Mariyan Ognyanov

7 March 2018 24	Cherno More	2–3	Levski Sofia	Varna
17:30 EET	Vasilev 22', 76'; M. Ognyanov (yellow card) 27'; Hassani (yellow card) 27'; Dimov (yellow card) 58'; Tsvetkov (yellow card) 64'; G. Iliev (yellow card) 69'; Vasilev (yellow card) 82'	Report	Vutov 21'; Gómez (yellow card) 32'; Paulinho 38'; Vutov (red card) 54'; Jablonský 65'; Belaïd (yellow card) 69'; Cvetković (yellow card) 74'; Krastev (yellow card) 85'	Stadium: Ticha; Attendance: 3,080; Referee: Stanislav Todorov (Shumen); Man of the Match: David Jablonský

10 March 2018 25	Ludogorets Razgrad	3–1	Cherno More	Razgrad
17:30 EET	Wanderson 8'; Marcelinho 14'; Dyakov (yellow card) 35'; Misidjan 41'; Moți (yellow card) 48'; Góralski (yellow card) 88'	Report	Kiki 32'; Tsvetkov (yellow card) 78'; Konongo (yellow card) 87'; Vasilev (yellow card) 90'	Stadium: Ludogorets Arena; Attendance: 900; Referee: Nikola Popov (Sofia); Man of the Match: Wanderson

18 March 2018 26	Cherno More	0–1	Lokomotiv Plovdiv	Varna
16:00 EET	Vasilev (yellow card) 21'; G. Iliev (yellow card) 24'; Tsvetkov (yellow card) 85'	Report	Musa (yellow card) 19'; Bouhna 29'; Aralica (yellow card) 43'; Bouhna (yellow card) 54'; Bakalov (yellow card) 87' (yellow-red card) 87'; Mihaljević (yellow card) 89'; Buljat (yellow card) 90+1'	Stadium: Ticha; Attendance: 780; Referee: Stefan Apostolov (Simitli); Man of the Match: Dimitar Velkovski

===== League table =====
Pos	Team	Pld	W	D	L	GF	GA	GD	Pts	Qualification
8	Septemvri Sofia	26	9	4	13	25	42	−17	31 (Note: Septemvri Sofia ahead of Lokomotiv Plovdiv on head-to-head record; Septemvri Sofia–Lokomotiv Plovdiv 3-1, Lokomotiv Plovdiv–Septemvri Sofia 1-0.)	Qualification for the Relegation round
9	Lokomotiv Plovdiv	26	8	7	11	22	37	−15	31	Qualification for the Relegation round
10	Cherno More	26	7	6	13	24	32	−8	27	Qualification for the Relegation round
11	Pirin Blagoevgrad	26	6	8	12	20	28	−8	26	Qualification for the Relegation round
12	Dunav Ruse	26	5	6	15	17	38	−21	21 (Note: Dunav Ruse ahead of Etar on head-to-head record; Dunav Ruse–Etar 0–0, Etar–Dunav Ruse 0–2.)	Qualification for the Relegation round

Source: Soccerway
Rules for classification: 1) Points; 2) Head-to-head points; 3) Head-to-head goal difference; 4) Head-to-head goals scored; 5) Head-to-head away goals scored (only if two teams); 6) Goal difference; 7) Goals scored; 8) Fairplay ranking; 9) Draw.

===== Results summary =====
Overall								Home						Away					
Pld	W	D	L	GF	GA	GD	Pts	W	D	L	GF	GA	GD	W	D	L	GF	GA	GD
26	7	6	13	24	32	−8	27	2	3	8	8	18	−10	5	3	5	16	14	+2

Last updated: 18 March 2018.
Source: bulgarian-football.com

===== League performance =====
Round	1	2	3	4	5	6	7	8	9	10	11	12	13	14	15	16	17	18	19	20	21	22	23	24	25	26
Ground	H	A	H	A	H	A	H	A	H	H	A	H	A	A	H	A	H	A	H	A	H	A	A	H	A	H
Result	W	W	W	D	D	W	L	L	L	D	L	L	W	W	L	W	L	L	D	L	L	D	D	L	L	L
Position	3	1	1	1	1	1	4	4	6	6	6	9	7	6	7	7	7	7	7	7	8	8	8	9	10	10

Source: bulgarian-football.com
A = Away; H = Home; W = Win; D = Draw; L = Loss

==== Relegation round ====
===== Matches =====
30 March 2018 27	Cherno More	2–1	Pirin Blagoevgrad	Varna
20:00 EEST	Minchev 6'; G. Iliev 45+1'	Report	Yordanov 10'; Popev (yellow card) 56'; Yordanov (yellow card) 76'; Sandev (red card) 90+1'	Stadium: Ticha; Attendance: 1,300; Referee: Valentin Zhelezov (Burgas); Man of the Match: Georgi Iliev

5 April 2018 28	Slavia Sofia	1–1	Cherno More	Sofia
19:30 EEST	Uzunov (yellow card) 38'; G. Ivanov 61'	Report	Vasilev 22'; Stanchev (yellow card) 37'; G. Iliev (yellow card) 41'; Kiki (yellow card) 61'; Vitanov (yellow card) 75'	Stadium: Vasil Levski; Attendance: 90; Referee: Nikola Popov (Sofia); Man of the Match: Galin Ivanov

13 April 2018 29	Cherno More	2–0	Vitosha Bistritsa	Varna
17:30 EEST	Vasilev 19', 32'; Stanchev (yellow card) 26'	Report		Stadium: Ticha; Attendance: 740; Referee: Volen Chinkov (Sofia); Man of the Match: Radoslav Vasilev

17 April 2018 30	Pirin Blagoevgrad	0–2	Cherno More	Blagoevgrad
17:30 EEST	Nichev (yellow card) 77'; Topuzov (yellow card) 86'	Report	Vitanov (yellow card) 22'; Georgiev 39' (o.g.); Minchev 45+1'	Stadium: Hristo Botev; Attendance: 300; Referee: Ivaylo Stoyanov (Petrich); Man of the Match: Martin Minchev

20 April 2018 31	Cherno More	2–0	Slavia Sofia	Varna
20:00 EEST	Kuzma 38'; Zehirov (yellow card) 42'; Bozhilov 51'; Kiki (yellow card) 70'; Fennouche (yellow card) 85'	Report	Mbah (yellow card) 36'	Stadium: Ticha; Attendance: 660; Referee: Stanislav Todorov (Shumen); Man of the Match: Georgi Bozhilov

28 April 2018 32	Vitosha Bistritsa	1–0	Cherno More	Bistritsa
17:30 EEST	Peev 36' (pen.); Kochilov (yellow card) 52'; Tsankov (yellow card) 69'	Report		Stadium: Bistritsa; Attendance: 80; Referee: Georgi Davidov (Veliko Tarnovo); Man of the Match: Daniel Peev

===== League table =====
Pos	Team	Pld	W	D	L	GF	GA	GD	Pts	Qualification or relegation
1	Slavia Sofia	32	11	10	11	44	44	0	43	Qualification for the Europa League first qualifying round (Note: Slavia Sofia qualified for the Europa League first qualifying round by winning the 2017–18 Bulgarian Cup.)
2	Cherno More	32	11	7	14	33	35	−2	40	Qualification for the European play-off quarter-finals
3	Pirin Blagoevgrad (R)	32	7	9	16	29	42	−13	30	Qualification for the relegation play-offs
4	Vitosha Bistritsa (O)	32	1	10	21	17	60	−43	13	Qualification for the relegation play-offs

Source: Soccerway
Rules for classification: 1) Points; 2) Head-to-head points; 3) Head-to-head goal difference; 4) Head-to-head goals scored; 5) Head-to-head away goals scored (only if two teams); 6) Goal difference; 7) Goals scored; 8) Fairplay ranking; 9) Draw.
(O) Play-off winners; (R) Relegated

===== Results summary =====
Overall								Home						Away					
Pld	W	D	L	GF	GA	GD	Pts	W	D	L	GF	GA	GD	W	D	L	GF	GA	GD
6	4	1	1	9	3	+6	13	3	0	0	6	1	+5	1	1	1	3	2	+1

Last updated: 28 April 2018.
Source: bulgarian-football.com

===== League performance =====
Round	1	2	3	4	5	6
Ground	H	A	H	A	H	A
Result	W	D	W	W	W	L
Position	2	2	2	2	2	2

Source: bulgarian-football.com
A = Away; H = Home; W = Win; D = Draw; L = Loss

==== European play-offs ====
5 May 2018 Quarter-finals	Cherno More	2–1	Septemvri Sofia	Varna
17:00 EEST	G. Iliev 45+1', 77' (pen.); Bozhilov (yellow card) 65'; Stanchev (yellow card) 84'	Report	Gadi (yellow card) 32'; Fabiano (yellow card) 52' (yellow-red card) 76'; Toshev 57'; Meledje (yellow card) 71'; Stoyanov (yellow card) 72'	Stadium: Ticha; Attendance: 770; Referee: Volen Chinkov (Sofia); Man of the Match: Georgi Iliev

11 May 2018 Quarter-finals	Septemvri Sofia	1–2 (2–4 agg.)	Cherno More	Sofia
17:30 EEST	Galchev (yellow card) 67'; Toshev 85'	Report	Fennouche 39', 43'; Hassani (yellow card) 45'	Stadium: Vasil Levski; Attendance: 200; Referee: Stefan Apostolov (Simitli); Man of the Match: Mehdi Fennouche

16 May 2018 Semi-finals	Cherno More	2–1	Lokomotiv Plovdiv	Varna
19:00 EEST	Zehirov 61'; Fennouche 64'; Fennouche (yellow card) 79'	Report	Banović (yellow card) 9'; Mihaljević (yellow card) 40'; Mihaljević 84'; Aralica (red card) 90+3'	Stadium: Ticha; Attendance: 1,250; Referee: Nikolay Yordanov (Sofia); Man of the Match: Atanas Zehirov

19 May 2018 Semi-finals	Lokomotiv Plovdiv	2–2 (a.e.t.) (3–4 agg.)	Cherno More	Plovdiv
19:45 EEST	Mihaljević 12', 42'; Eze (yellow card) 24'; Velkovski (yellow card) 62'; Raykov (yellow card) 110'; Umarbayev (yellow card) 114'	Report	Minchev (yellow card) 39'; Kuzma 69'; Dimov (yellow card) 79'; Stanchev (yellow card) 80'; Vitanov (yellow card) 90+4'; Dimov 103'	Stadium: Lokomotiv; Attendance: 970; Referee: Nikola Popov (Sofia); Man of the Match: Daniel Dimov

24 May 2018 Final	Levski Sofia	4–1	Cherno More	Sofia
20:30 EEST	Obertan 24'; Buș 39'; Buș (yellow card) 68'; Gómez (yellow card) 70'; Panayotov 73'; Jablonský (yellow card) 77'; Goranov 83' (pen.)	Report	Konongo (yellow card) 5'; Bozhilov (yellow card) 17'; Dimov (yellow card) 27'; Enchev (yellow card) 29'; Fennouche 55'; G. Iliev (yellow card) 76'; Vitanov (yellow card) 81'; Hassani (yellow card) 87'	Stadium: Vivacom Arena - Georgi Asparuhov; Attendance: 4,030; Referee: Georgi Kabakov (Plovdiv); Man of the Match: Vasil Panayotov

=== Bulgarian Cup ===
20 September 2017 1st round	Montana	2–1	Cherno More	Chiprovtsi
16:00 EEST	A. Iliev 23'; A. Iliev (yellow card) 29'; Vasev (yellow card) 88'; Atanasov 90+2'	Report	M. Ognyanov (yellow card) 54'; Soukouna (yellow card) 83'; Starokin (yellow card) 86'; Kuzma 89'	Stadium: Kiprovets; Attendance: 500; Referee: Volen Chinkov (Sofia)

== Statistics ==
=== Player appearances ===
Key:
‡ On loan from another club * First appearance(s) for the club

- # = Squad number
- **Pos** = Playing position
- **P** = Number of games played
- **G** = Number of goals scored
- **GK** = Goalkeeper
- **DF** = Defender
- **MF** = Midfielder
- **FW** = Forward
- = Yellow cards
- = Red cards
- † Permanent player left club during the season
- ¤ Loaned to another club for part or all of season

Correct as of 24 May 2018. Starting appearances are listed first, followed by substitute appearances in parentheses where applicable.

No.	Pos	Name	P	G	P	G	P	G	A yellow card	A red card	Notes
No.	Pos	Name	League		Bulgarian Cup		Total		Discipline		Notes
3	DF	(Bulgaria) Ertan Tombak	1(2)	0	1	0	2(2)	0	1	0	
5	DF	(Bulgaria) Stefan Stanchev	17(6)	0	1	0	18(6)	0	5	0	
6	MF	(Bulgaria) Aleksandar Tsvetkov †	25(1)	0	0(1)	0	25(2)	0	5	0	
7	DF	(Portugal) Vitinha	1	0	0	0	1	0	0	0	
8	MF	(Bulgaria) Emil Yanchev	2(6)	0	0	0	2(6)	0	0	0	
9	FW	(Bulgaria) Tsvetelin Chunchukov †	8(1)	1	0	0	8(1)	1	3	1	
9	MF	(Algeria) Mehdi Fennouche	12(1)	4	0	0	12(1)	4	3	0	
10	MF	(Bulgaria) Ilian Iliev †	0	0	0	0	0	0	0	0	
10	FW	(Bulgaria) Radoslav Vasilev	14(2)	**6**	0	0	14(2)	**6**	3	0	
11	FW	(France) Amadou Soukouna †	6(2)	0	1	0	7(2)	0	1	0	
13	MF	(Bulgaria) Ivan Kokonov †	1(4)	0	0	0	1(4)	0	0	0	
14	FW	(Bulgaria) Georgi Bozhilov	13(7)	3	0(1)	0	13(8)	3	2	0	
15	DF	(Bulgaria) Aleksandar Aleksandrov †	10(4)	0	0	0	10(4)	0	1	0	
16	MF	(Bulgaria) Petar Vitanov	14	0	0	0	14	0	5	0	
17	DF	(Bulgaria) Martin Kostadinov	14(4)	0	0(1)	0	14(5)	0	0	0	
18	MF	(Bulgaria) Atanas Zehirov	29(3)	2	1	0	30(3)	2	5	0	
19	DF	(Bulgaria) Iliya Milanov †	7	0	1	0	8	0	4	0	
21	MF	(Bulgaria) Georgi Iliev (c)	**36**	**6**	0	0	**36**	**6**	8	0	
22	MF	(Bulgaria) Mariyan Ognyanov	22(2)	**6**	1	0	23(2)	**6**	5	0	
23	DF	(Algeria) Ilias Hassani	32	1	1	0	33	1	**12**	1	
25	GK	(Bulgaria) Ivan Dyulgerov	3	0	0	0	3	0	0	0	
26	GK	(Bulgaria) Ivan Dichevski	0	0	0	0	0	0	0	0	
27	DF	(Bulgaria) Daniel Dimov	16	1	0	0	16	1	4	0	
29	FW	(Slovakia) Marek Kuzma	11(16)	3	1	1	12(16)	4	4	0	
33	GK	(Bulgaria) Emil Mihaylov †	16	0	0	0	16	0	2	0	
33	DF	(Bulgaria) Miroslav Enchev	3(3)	0	0	0	3(3)	0	1	0	
36	MF	(Bulgaria) Rumen Kasabov	0	0	0	0	0	0	0	0	
37	MF	(Bulgaria) Lachezar Yordanov	0(1)	0	0	0	0(1)	0	0	0	
38	MF	(Democratic Republic of the Congo) Aristote N'Dongala	6(2)	0	0	0	6(2)	0	0	0	
41	DF	(Republic of the Congo) Hugo Konongo	13	0	0	0	13	0	2	0	
45	MF	(Portugal) Fábinho	1(5)	0	0	0	1(5)	0	0	0	
66	MF	(Bulgaria) Orlin Starokin †	16	2	1	0	17	2	2	0	
70	MF	(Bulgaria) Borislav Baldzhiyski †	0(2)	0	0	0	0(2)	0	1	0	
73	DF	(Czech Republic) Ondřej Sukup †	19(1)	1	0	0	19(1)	1	3	0	
77	GK	(Ukraine) Yevhen Borovyk †	3	0	1	0	4	0	1	0	
81	MF	(Bulgaria) Anton Ognyanov †	5(3)	1	0	0	5(3)	1	1	0	
88	GK	(Bulgaria) Blagoy Makendzhiev	15	0	0	0	15	0	1	0	
90	FW	(Bulgaria) Martin Minchev	6(16)	2	0	0	6(16)	2	1	0	
97	MF	(Bulgaria) Nikolay Minkov	5(9)	0	1	0	6(9)	0	1	0	
98	FW	(Bulgaria) Valentin Yoskov ¤	0	0	0	0	0	0	0	0	
99	MF	(Bulgaria) Dani Kiki	5(4)	1	0	0	5(4)	1	2	0	

=== Minutes on the pitch ===
Includes injury time. Positions indicate the most natural position of the particular player, followed by alternative positions where he actually started games during the course of the season.

No.	Position	Alternative Position(s)	Player	First League	Bulgarian Cup	Total
3	RB		(Bulgaria) Ertan Tombak	106	53	159
5	RB	CB / LB	(Bulgaria) Stefan Stanchev	1789	96	1885
6	CM	CB / AM / LW / RW / DM	(Bulgaria) Aleksandar Tsvetkov	2385	43	2428
7	LB		(Portugal) Vitinha	51	0	51
8	CM	CB / DM	(Bulgaria) Emil Yanchev	218	0	218
9	FW		(Bulgaria) Tsvetelin Chunchukov	604	0	604
9	LW	RW / FW	(Algeria) Mehdi Fennouche	1044	0	1044
10	AM		(Bulgaria) Ilian Iliev	0	0	0
10	FW	AM	(Bulgaria) Radoslav Vasilev	1311	0	1311
11	FW	AM	(France) Amadou Soukouna	563	96	659
13	LW		(Bulgaria) Ivan Kokonov	111	0	111
14	FW	AM	(Bulgaria) Georgi Bozhilov	1206	49	1255
15	CB		(Bulgaria) Aleksandar Aleksandrov	1076	0	1076
16	DM		(Bulgaria) Petar Vitanov	1258	0	1258
17	RB	LB / LWB / RW	(Bulgaria) Martin Kostadinov	1354	26	1380
18	RW	RWB / RB / LW	(Bulgaria) Atanas Zehirov	2652	96	2748
19	CB		(Bulgaria) Iliya Milanov	660	70	730
21	CM	DM / AM	(Bulgaria) Georgi Iliev	**3329**	0	**3329**
22	AM	CM / LW	(Bulgaria) Mariyan Ognyanov	1950	96	2046
23	CB	LB / RB / DM	(Algeria) Ilias Hassani	2992	96	3088
25	GK		(Bulgaria) Ivan Dyulgerov	281	0	281
26	GK		(Bulgaria) Ivan Dichevski	0	0	0
27	CB		(Bulgaria) Daniel Dimov	1536	0	1536
29	FW	LW	(Slovakia) Marek Kuzma	1330	96	1426
33	GK		(Bulgaria) Emil Mihaylov	1517	0	1517
33	CB		(Bulgaria) Miroslav Enchev	315	0	315
36	AM		(Bulgaria) Rumen Kasabov	0	0	0
37	CM		(Bulgaria) Lachezar Yordanov	18	0	18
38	LW	RW	(Democratic Republic of the Congo) Aristote N'Dongala	668	0	668
41	LB		(Republic of the Congo) Hugo Konongo	1139	0	1139
45	CM		(Portugal) Fábinho	158	0	158
66	DM	CM / LW / LB	(Bulgaria) Orlin Starokin	1365	96	1461
70	AM		(Bulgaria) Borislav Baldzhiyski	50	0	50
73	RB	LB / CB	(Czech Republic) Ondřej Sukup	1829	0	1829
77	GK		(Ukraine) Yevhen Borovyk	288	96	384
81	LW		(Bulgaria) Anton Ognyanov	445	0	445
88	GK		(Bulgaria) Blagoy Makendzhiev	1447	0	1447
90	FW	LW / RW	(Bulgaria) Martin Minchev	723	0	723
97	RW	LW	(Bulgaria) Nikolay Minkov	513	47	560
98	FW		(Bulgaria) Valentin Yoskov	0	0	0
99	AM	RW	(Bulgaria) Dani Kiki	526	0	526

Correct as of match played on 24 May 2018.

=== Goalscorers ===
Rank	Pos.	Player	L	C	Total
1	MF	(Bulgaria) Mariyan Ognyanov	6	0	6
1	FW	(Bulgaria) Radoslav Vasilev	6	0	6
1	MF	(Bulgaria) Georgi Iliev	6	0	6
2	MF	(Algeria) Mehdi Fennouche	4	0	4
2	FW	(Slovakia) Marek Kuzma	3	1	4
3	FW	(Bulgaria) Georgi Bozhilov	3	0	3
4	MF	(Bulgaria) Orlin Starokin	2	0	2
4	FW	(Bulgaria) Martin Minchev	2	0	2
4	MF	(Bulgaria) Atanas Zehirov	2	0	2
5	DF	(Czech Republic) Ondřej Sukup	1	0	1
5	FW	(Bulgaria) Tsvetelin Chunchukov	1	0	1
5	DF	(Algeria) Ilias Hassani	1	0	1
5	MF	(Bulgaria) Anton Ognyanov	1	0	1
5	MF	(Bulgaria) Dani Kiki	1	0	1
5	DF	(Bulgaria) Daniel Dimov	1	0	1
Own goals			2	0	2
**Totals**			**42**	**1**	43

Last updated: 24 May 2018

=== Clean sheets ===
R	No.	Nat	Goalkeeper	L	C	**Total**
1	33	(Bulgaria)	Emil Mihaylov	6	–	**6**
2	88	(Bulgaria)	Blagoy Makendzhiev	3	–	**3**
3	77	(Ukraine)	Yevhen Borovyk	1	0	**1**
3	25	(Bulgaria)	Ivan Dyulgerov	1	–	**1**
			**Totals**	**11**	**0**	**11**

Last updated: 20 April 2018

=== Own goals ===
Own goals in favour
Date	Pos.	Player	Opponent	Competition
19 Nov	MF	(Bulgaria) Bircent Karagaren	Dunav Ruse	First League
17 Apr	GK	(Bulgaria) Georgi Georgiev	Pirin Blagoevgrad	First League

Own goals conceded
Date	Pos.	Player	Opponent	Competition

=== Man of the Match performances ===
Ranking	Squad Number	Position	Player	Round	Opponent	Total
1	22	MF	(Bulgaria) Mariyan Ognyanov	2	Vereya (A)	4
1	22	MF	(Bulgaria) Mariyan Ognyanov	14	Vitosha Bistritsa (A)	4
1	22	MF	(Bulgaria) Mariyan Ognyanov	16	Dunav Ruse (A)	4
1	22	MF	(Bulgaria) Mariyan Ognyanov	23	Etar (A)	4
1	21	MF	(Bulgaria) Georgi Iliev	13	Lokomotiv Plovdiv (A)	4
1	21	MF	(Bulgaria) Georgi Iliev	15	Vereya (H)	4
1	21	MF	(Bulgaria) Georgi Iliev	27	Pirin Blagoevgrad (H)	4
1	21	MF	(Bulgaria) Georgi Iliev	EP 1/4	Septemvri Sofia (H)	4
2	18	MF	(Bulgaria) Atanas Zehirov	5	Slavia Sofia (H)	3
2	18	MF	(Bulgaria) Atanas Zehirov	6	Botev Plovdiv (A)	3
2	18	MF	(Bulgaria) Atanas Zehirov	EP 1/2	Lokomotiv Plovdiv (H)	3
3	17	DF	(Bulgaria) Martin Kostadinov	3	Dunav Ruse (H)	2
3	17	DF	(Bulgaria) Martin Kostadinov	4	Pirin Blagoevgrad (A)	2
3	14	FW	(Bulgaria) Georgi Bozhilov	1	Vitosha Bistritsa (H)	2
3	14	FW	(Bulgaria) Georgi Bozhilov	31	Slavia Sofia (H)	2
4	15	DF	(Bulgaria) Aleksandar Aleksandrov	19	Botev Plovdiv (H)	1
4	88	GK	(Bulgaria) Blagoy Makendzhiev	22	CSKA Sofia (A)	1
4	10	FW	(Bulgaria) Radoslav Vasilev	29	Vitosha Bistritsa (H)	1
4	90	FW	(Bulgaria) Martin Minchev	30	Pirin Blagoevgrad (A)	1
4	9	MF	(Algeria) Mehdi Fennouche	EP 1/4	Septemvri Sofia (A)	1
4	27	DF	(Bulgaria) Daniel Dimov	EP 1/2	Lokomotiv Plovdiv (A)	1

Last updated: 19 May 2018
Source: Match reports in Competitions, Gong.bg Man of the Match Awards

=== Disciplinary record ===
Correct as of 24 May 2018
Players are listed in descending order of (yellow card)
Players with the same amount of cards are listed by their position on the club's official website

**R.**	**No.**	**Nat**	**Pos**	**Name**	**First League**			**Bulgarian Cup**			**Total**		
**R.**	**No.**	**Nat**	**Pos**	**Name**	Yellow card	(yellow card) (yellow-red card)	Red card	Yellow card	(yellow card) (yellow-red card)	Red card	Yellow card	(yellow card) (yellow-red card)	Red card
1	23	(Algeria)	DF	Ilias Hassani	12	0	1	0	0	0	12	0	1
2	21	(Bulgaria)	MF	Georgi Iliev	8	0	0	0	0	0	8	0	0
3	5	(Bulgaria)	DF	Stefan Stanchev	5	0	0	0	0	0	5	0	0
3	6	(Bulgaria)	MF	Aleksandar Tsvetkov	5	0	0	0	0	0	5	0	0
3	9	(Bulgaria)	FW	Tsvetelin Chunchukov	3	1	0	0	0	0	3	1	0
3	16	(Bulgaria)	MF	Petar Vitanov	5	0	0	0	0	0	5	0	0
3	18	(Bulgaria)	MF	Atanas Zehirov	5	0	0	0	0	0	5	0	0
3	22	(Bulgaria)	MF	Mariyan Ognyanov	4	0	0	1	0	0	5	0	0
4	19	(Bulgaria)	DF	Iliya Milanov	4	0	0	0	0	0	4	0	0
4	27	(Bulgaria)	DF	Daniel Dimov	4	0	0	0	0	0	4	0	0
4	29	(Slovakia)	FW	Marek Kuzma	4	0	0	0	0	0	4	0	0
5	9	(Algeria)	MF	Mehdi Fennouche	3	0	0	0	0	0	3	0	0
5	10	(Bulgaria)	FW	Radoslav Vasilev	3	0	0	0	0	0	3	0	0
5	73	(Czech Republic)	DF	Ondřej Sukup	3	0	0	0	0	0	3	0	0
6	14	(Bulgaria)	FW	Georgi Bozhilov	2	0	0	0	0	0	2	0	0
6	33	(Bulgaria)	GK	Emil Mihaylov	2	0	0	0	0	0	2	0	0
6	41	(Republic of the Congo)	DF	Hugo Konongo	2	0	0	0	0	0	2	0	0
6	66	(Bulgaria)	MF	Orlin Starokin	1	0	0	1	0	0	2	0	0
6	99	(Bulgaria)	MF	Dani Kiki	2	0	0	0	0	0	2	0	0
7	3	(Bulgaria)	DF	Ertan Tombak	1	0	0	0	0	0	1	0	0
7	11	(France)	FW	Amadou Soukouna	0	0	0	1	0	0	1	0	0
7	15	(Bulgaria)	DF	Aleksandar Aleksandrov	1	0	0	0	0	0	1	0	0
7	33	(Bulgaria)	DF	Miroslav Enchev	1	0	0	0	0	0	1	0	0
7	70	(Bulgaria)	MF	Borislav Baldzhiyski	1	0	0	0	0	0	1	0	0
7	77	(Ukraine)	GK	Yevhen Borovyk	1	0	0	0	0	0	1	0	0
7	81	(Bulgaria)	MF	Anton Ognyanov	1	0	0	0	0	0	1	0	0
7	88	(Bulgaria)	GK	Blagoy Makendzhiev	1	0	0	0	0	0	1	0	0
7	90	(Bulgaria)	FW	Martin Minchev	1	0	0	0	0	0	1	0	0
7	97	(Bulgaria)	MF	Nikolay Minkov	1	0	0	0	0	0	1	0	0
				**TOTALS**	**86**	**1**	**1**	**3**	**0**	**0**	**89**	**1**	**1**

==== Suspensions served ====
Date	Matches Missed	Player	Reason	Opponents Missed
16 May 2017	1	(Bulgaria) Orlin Starokin	5th (yellow card) vs Vereya (previous season as Pirin Blagoevgrad player)	Vitosha Bistritsa (H)
31 May 2017	1	(Bulgaria) Aleksandar Tsvetkov	(red card) vs Levski Sofia (previous season)	Vitosha Bistritsa (H)
4 June 2017	1	(Bulgaria) Ertan Tombak	5th (yellow card) vs Slavia Sofia U19 (previous season as U19 player)	Vitosha Bistritsa (H)
27 August 2017	1	(Algeria) Ilias Hassani	(red card) vs Septemvri Sofia	Beroe (A)
16 September 2017	1	(Bulgaria) Tsvetelin Chunchukov	(red card) vs CSKA Sofia	Montana (A) (C)
21 October 2017	1	(Algeria) Ilias Hassani	5th (yellow card) vs Lokomotiv Plovdiv	Vitosha Bistritsa (A)
8 December 2017	2	(Algeria) Ilias Hassani	9th (yellow card) vs Septemvri Sofia	Beroe (H), CSKA Sofia (A)
7 March 2018	1	(Bulgaria) Mariyan Ognyanov	5th (yellow card) vs Levski Sofia	Ludogorets Razgrad (A)
7 March 2018	1	(Bulgaria) Georgi Iliev	5th (yellow card) vs Levski Sofia	Ludogorets Razgrad (A)
18 March 2018	1	(Bulgaria) Aleksandar Tsvetkov	5th (yellow card) vs Lokomotiv Plovdiv	Pirin Blagoevgrad (H)
1 April 2018	3	(Bulgaria) Emil Yanchev	(red card) vs Septemvri Sofia U19 (as U19 player)	Slavia Sofia (A), Vitosha Bistritsa (H), Pirin Blagoevgrad (A)
17 April 2018	1	(Bulgaria) Petar Vitanov	5th (yellow card) vs Pirin Blagoevgrad (including 2 (yellow card) as Vereya player)	Slavia Sofia (H)
20 April 2018	1	(Bulgaria) Atanas Zehirov	5th (yellow card) vs Slavia Sofia	Vitosha Bistritsa (A)
20 April 2018	1	(Bulgaria) Dani Kiki	5th (yellow card) vs Slavia Sofia (including 3 (yellow card) as Lokomotiv Plovdiv player)	Vitosha Bistritsa (A)
20 April 2018	1	(Algeria) Mehdi Fennouche	5th (yellow card) vs Slavia Sofia (including 3 (yellow card) as Vereya player)	Vitosha Bistritsa (A)
19 May 2018	1	(Bulgaria) Stefan Stanchev	5th (yellow card) vs Lokomotiv Plovdiv	Levski Sofia (A) (EP)

=== Injuries ===
Players in bold are still out from their injuries.
Players listed will/have miss(ed) at least one competitive game (missing from whole match day squad).

Date	No.	Pos.	Name	Injury	Note	Recovery time	Games missed	Source
27 June	7	DF	(Portugal) Vitinha	Achilles tendon injury	Occurred during pre-season friendly against Septemvri Sofia.	Exact time unknown	4	
8 July	15	DF	(Bulgaria) Aleksandar Aleksandrov	Foot injury	Occurred during pre-season friendly against Dunărea Călărași.	Exact time unknown	2	
4 August	14	FW	(Bulgaria) Georgi Bozhilov	Sprained ankle	Occurred during match against Pirin Blagoevgrad.	2 weeks	2	
4 August	17	DF	(Bulgaria) Martin Kostadinov	Pulled hamstring	Occurred during match against Pirin Blagoevgrad.	Exact time unknown	2	
11 August	9	FW	(Bulgaria) Tsvetelin Chunchukov	Pulled hamstring	Occurred during match against Slavia Sofia.	Exact time unknown	2	
11 August	7	DF	(Portugal) Vitinha	Achilles tendon rupture	Occurred during match against Slavia Sofia.	6 months	33	
30 September	15	DF	(Bulgaria) Aleksandar Aleksandrov	Common cold	Occurred during training.	1 week	1	
7 October	77	GK	(Ukraine) Yevhen Borovyk	Ankle fracture	Occurred during training.	3 months	8	
17 October	9	FW	(Bulgaria) Tsvetelin Chunchukov	PCL injury	Occurred during training.	3 months	8	
19 October	14	FW	(Bulgaria) Georgi Bozhilov	Ankle injury	Occurred during training.	Exact time unknown	14	
20 October	17	DF	(Bulgaria) Martin Kostadinov	Common cold	Occurred during training.	1 week	1	
21 October	5	DF	(Bulgaria) Stefan Stanchev	Unspecified injury	Occurred during match against Lokomotiv Plovdiv.	1 week	1	
27 October	17	DF	(Bulgaria) Martin Kostadinov	PCL injury	Occurred during match against Vitosha Bistritsa.	3 months	6	
13 November	29	FW	(Slovakia) Marek Kuzma	Knee injury	Occurred during training.	Exact time unknown	2	
19 November	33	GK	(Bulgaria) Emil Mihaylov	Pulled hamstring	Occurred during match against Dunav Ruse.	Exact time unknown	1	
24 November	66	MF	(Bulgaria) Orlin Starokin	Thigh injury	Occurred during match against Pirin Blagoevgrad.	Exact time unknown	2	
28 November	18	MF	(Bulgaria) Atanas Zehirov	Ankle injury	Occurred during match against Slavia Sofia.	Exact time unknown	1	
5 December	97	MF	(Bulgaria) Nikolay Minkov	Ankle injury	Occurred during training.	1 week	1	
16 January	5	DF	(Bulgaria) Stefan Stanchev	PCL injury	Occurred during pre-season training.	3 months	6	
23 January	99	MF	(Bulgaria) Dani Kiki	Pulled hamstring	Occurred during pre-season friendly against Tirana.	Exact time unknown	2	
17 February	33	DF	(Bulgaria) Miroslav Enchev	Ankle injury	Occurred during match against Beroe.	1 week	1	
21 February	9	MF	(Algeria) Mehdi Fennouche	Thigh injury	Occurred during training.	Exact time unknown	1	
3 March	17	DF	(Bulgaria) Martin Kostadinov	Unspecified injury	Occurred during match against Etar.	Exact time unknown	2	
9 March	33	DF	(Bulgaria) Miroslav Enchev	Ankle injury	Reoccurrence of the injury from 17 February.	1 week	2	
18 March	22	MF	(Bulgaria) Mariyan Ognyanov	PCL injury	Occurred during match against Lokomotiv Plovdiv.	2 months	11	
29 March	38	MF	(Democratic Republic of the Congo) Aristote N'Dongala	Pulled hamstring	Occurred during training.	2 weeks	3	
9 April	3	DF	(Bulgaria) Ertan Tombak	Ankle injury	Occurred during training.	Exact time unknown	2	
10 April	33	DF	(Bulgaria) Miroslav Enchev	Ankle injury	Reoccurrence of the injury from 17 February.	1 week	1	
13 April	97	MF	(Bulgaria) Nikolay Minkov	Thigh injury	Occurred during match against Vitosha Bistritsa.	Exact time unknown	2	
14 April	17	DF	(Bulgaria) Martin Kostadinov	Pulled hamstring	Occurred during training.	3 weeks	5	
17 April	5	DF	(Bulgaria) Stefan Stanchev	Thigh injury	Occurred during warm-up for the match against Pirin Blagoevgrad.	1 week	2	
19 April	6	MF	(Bulgaria) Aleksandar Tsvetkov	Unspecified injury	Occurred during training.	Exact time unknown	1	
5 May	99	MF	(Bulgaria) Dani Kiki	Pulled hamstring	Occurred during match against Septemvri Sofia.	3 weeks	4	
16 May	9	MF	(Algeria) Mehdi Fennouche	Pulled hamstring	Occurred during match against Lokomotiv Plovdiv.	2 weeks	1	
17 May	3	DF	(Bulgaria) Ertan Tombak	Unspecified injury	Occurred during training.	Exact time unknown	2	

=== Home attendances ===
Correct as of match played on 16 May 2018.
Win Draw Loss Void

Competition	Date	Score	Opponent	Attendance
First League	15 July 2017	1–0	Vitosha Bistritsa	250
First League	28 July 2017	1–0	Dunav Ruse	2,480
First League	11 August 2017	1–1	Slavia Sofia	1,830
First League	27 August 2017	1–4	Septemvri Sofia	1,630
First League	16 September 2017	0–1	CSKA Sofia	6,500
First League	23 September 2017	0–0	Etar	1,650
First League	14 October 2017	0–1	Ludogorets Razgrad	3,980
First League	5 November 2017	1–2	Vereya	780
First League	24 November 2017	0–1	Pirin Blagoevgrad	610
First League	2 December 2017	0–0	Botev Plovdiv	780
First League	17 February 2018	1–4	Beroe	1,380
First League	7 March 2018	2–3	Levski Sofia	3,080
First League	18 March 2018	0–1	Lokomotiv Plovdiv	780
First League	30 March 2018	2–1	Pirin Blagoevgrad	1,300
First League	13 April 2018	2–0	Vitosha Bistritsa	740
First League	20 April 2018	2–0	Slavia Sofia	660
European play-off quarter-finals	5 May 2018	2–1	Septemvri Sofia	770
European play-off semi-finals	16 May 2018	2–1	Lokomotiv Plovdiv	1,250
			**Total attendance**	**30,450**
			**Total league attendance**	**30,450**
			**Average attendance**	**1,692**
			**Average league attendance**	**1,692**

Source: Match reports in Competitions

== Club ==
=== Coaching staff ===
Position	Staff
Manager	(Bulgaria) Georgi Ivanov (until 21 September) (Bulgaria) Emanuel Lukanov (21 September–28 December) (Bulgaria) Ilian Iliev (from 28 December)
Assistant First Team Coach	(Bulgaria) Ivaylo Petrov (until 21 September) (Bulgaria) Petar Kostadinov (from 28 December)
Assistant First Team Coach	(Bulgaria) Emanuel Lukanov (until 21 September)
Goalkeeper Coach	(Bulgaria) Stoyan Stavrev (until 28 December) (Bulgaria) Boyan Peykov (from 28 December)
First Team Fitness Coach	(Bulgaria) Veselin Markov
Individual Team Fitness Coach	(Bulgaria) Viktor Bumbalov
Medical Director	(Bulgaria) Dr. Petko Atev

Last updated: 1 July 2016
Source: Cherno More

=== Other information ===
Owner/Chairman	(Bulgaria) Marin Mitev
Chief Executive	(Bulgaria) Marin Marinov
Sporting Director	(Bulgaria) Todor Velikov
Ground (capacity and dimensions)	Ticha Stadium (12,500 / 103x67 metres)

Updated to match played 1 August 2012
Source: Cherno More
