= Emil Yanchev =

Bulgarian footballer

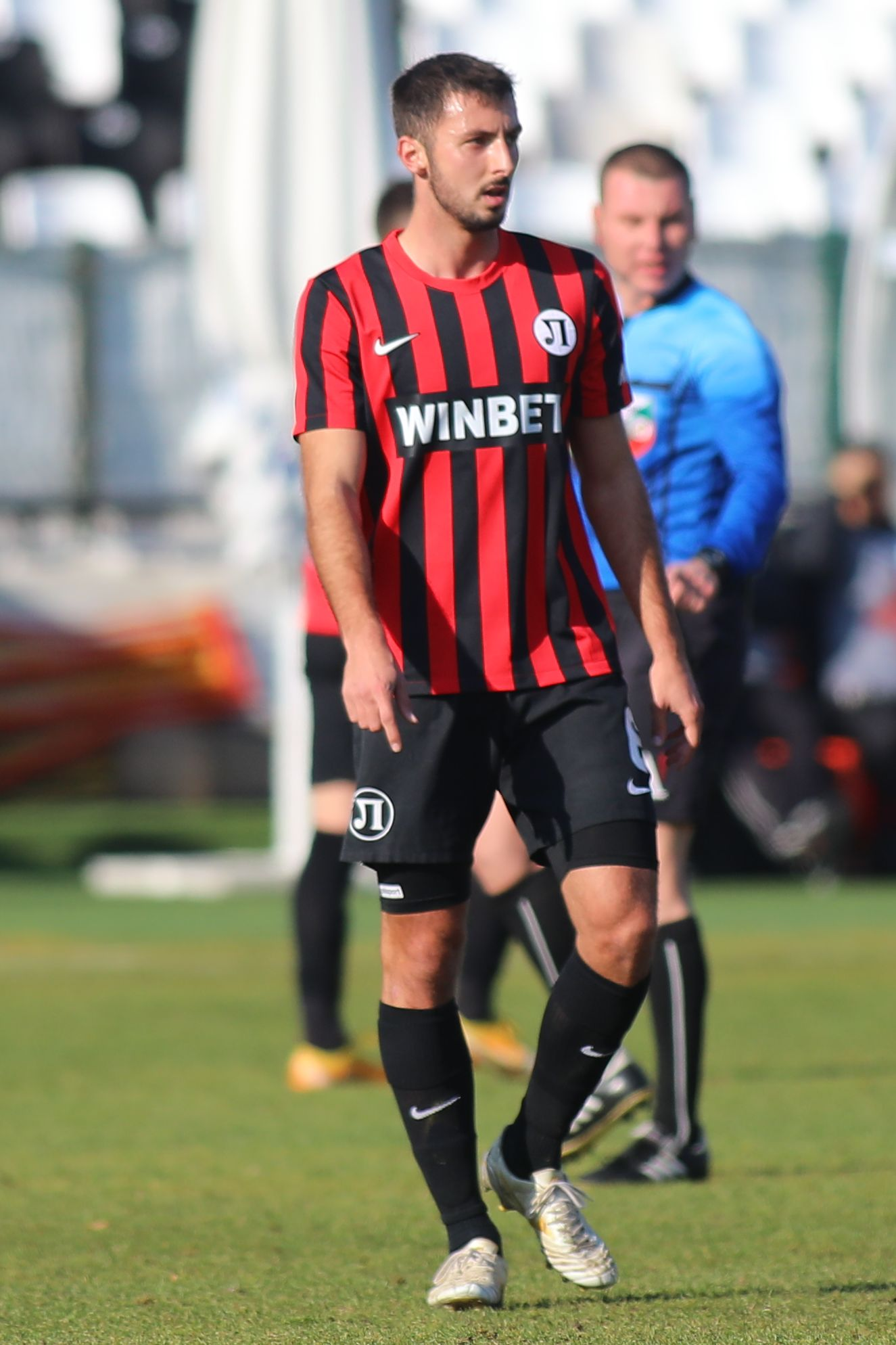

Personal information
- Full name: Emil Emilov Yanchev
- Date of birth: 8 February 1999 (age 27)
- Place of birth: Varna, Bulgaria
- Height: 1.85 m (6 ft 1 in)
- Positions: Centre midfielder; centre-back

Team information
- Current team: Chernomorets Burgas
- Number: 8

Youth career
- Cherno More

Senior career*
| Years | Team | Apps | (Gls) |
| 2017–2021 | Cherno More | 32 | (0) |
| 2021–2022 | Lokomotiv Plovdiv | 21 | (0) |
| 2022 | Pirin Blagoevgrad | 8 | (0) |
| 2023 | Dunav Ruse | 12 | (1) |
| 2023–2024 | Montana | 24 | (1) |
| 2024 | Fratria | 7 | (1) |
| 2025 | Sportist Svoge | 8 | (0) |
| 2025–2026 | Spartak Varna | 24 | (0) |
| 2026– | Chernomorets Burgas | 11 | (0) |

International career
| 2017 | Bulgaria U18 | 4 | (0) |
| 2017–2018 | Bulgaria U19 | 10 | (2) |
- * Club domestic league appearances and goals as of 15:41, 30 May 2026 (UTC)

Emil Emilov Yanchev (Bulgarian: Емил Емилов Янчев; born 8 February 1999) is a Bulgarian professional footballer who plays as a midfielder for Second League club Chernomorets Burgas.

== Career ==
Yanchev made his first team league début in a 0–4 away defeat against Ludogorets Razgrad on 1 May 2017, coming on as substitute for Nikolay Minkov. On 6 July 2017, he signed his first professional contract.

== Career statistics ==
As of 1 July 2019

| Club | Season | League | | Cup | | Continental | | Total | |
| Club | Season | Apps | Goals | Apps | Goals | Apps | Goals | Apps | Goals |
|---|---|---|---|---|---|---|---|---|---|
| Cherno More | 2016–17 | 3 | 0 | 0 | 0 | — | | 3 | 0 |
| Cherno More | 2017–18 | 8 | 0 | 0 | 0 | — | | 8 | 0 |
| Cherno More | 2018–19 | 2 | 0 | 0 | 0 | — | | 2 | 0 |
| Cherno More | 2019–20 | 0 | 0 | 0 | 0 | — | | 0 | 0 |
| Cherno More | Total | 13 | 0 | 0 | 0 | 0 | 0 | 13 | 0 |

== International career ==
Yanchev received a call-up for the Bulgaria U18 team for the friendlies against Macedonia U18 on 9 and 11 May 2017. On 12 September 2017, he made his debut for Bulgaria U19 in a friendly against Bosnia and Herzegovina U19.
