= Ertan Tombak =

Bulgarian footballer

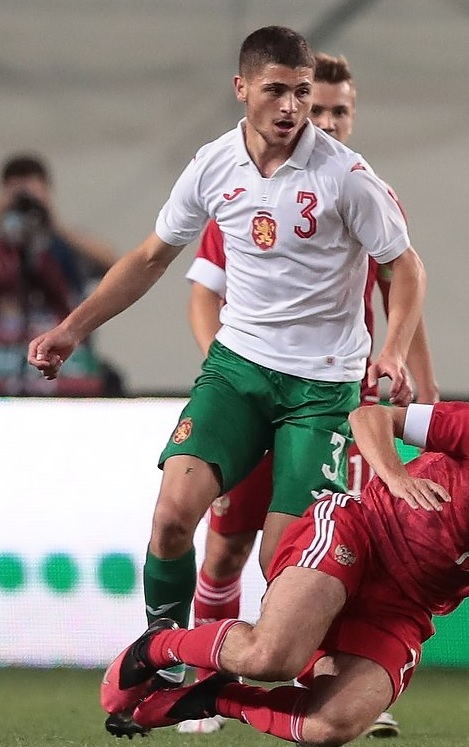
- Tombak with Bulgaria U21 in 2020

Personal information
- Full name: Ertan Yuzeir Tombak
- Date of birth: 30 May 1999 (age 27)
- Place of birth: Varna, Bulgaria
- Height: 1.80 m (5 ft 11 in)
- Position: Right back

Team information
- Current team: Cherno More
- Number: 50

Youth career
- –2017: Cherno More

Senior career*
Years	Team	Apps	(Gls)
2017–2018	Cherno More	4	(0)
2019–2025	Slavia Sofia	143	(1)
2025–	Cherno More	15	(0)

International career^{‡}
2017–2018	Bulgaria U18	3	(0)
2017–2018	Bulgaria U19	9	(0)
2019–2020	Bulgaria U21	6	(1)
2024	Bulgaria	1	(0)
- * Club domestic league appearances and goals as of 26 May 2026 ‡ National team caps and goals as of 8 June 2024

Ertan Yuzeir Tombak (Bulgarian: Ертан Юзеир Томбак; born 30 May 1999) is a Bulgarian professional footballer who plays as a right back for First League club Cherno More Varna.

== Career ==
=== Cherno More ===
On 31 May 2017, Tombak made his professional début in a 2–2 away draw against Levski Sofia, playing full 90 minutes. On 6 July 2017, he signed his first professional contract. Tombak publicly expressed his delight and stated that being part of the first team was a "dream come true".

On 6 October 2018 he announced his retirement from football to go to university in Sofia.

=== Slavia Sofia ===
In the fall of 2018 Tombak participated in some training sessions with Slavia Sofia, but from the team it was clarified that he was training just to keep in shape. Nevertheless, on 9 January 2019 Slavia officially announced Tombak as their first winter signing. On 29 April 2019 He made his debut for Slavia in a 2:2 draw against Lokomotiv Plovdiv playing 90 minutes. Оn 13 July Tombak mysteriously left Slavia after 6 years playing for the whites with a very big chance of retirement. After this decision he stated "We divided with Slavia, but I don't want to comment any further."

=== Cherno More return ===
On 3 December 2025 he shockingy returned to Cherno More the news broke out before a match against Beroe Stara Zagora when it was announced that he is part of the squad. The manager of Cherno More Ilian Iiliev explained evreything about the transfer. He said that Tombak attended Cherno More's match against Levski Sofia despite the 3–1 loss something ''sparked in him'' and after that the first idea was Tombak to join in January but because of the lack of players in his position he joined early. He made his debut in a 2–1 against Beroe coming on in the 71st minute.

== International career ==
Tombak was called up for the Bulgaria U18 squad for the friendlies against Macedonia U18 on 9 and 11 May 2017. On 12 September 2017, he made his debut for Bulgaria U19 in a friendly against Bosnia and Herzegovina U19. He scored his first goal for the Bulgaria U21 national side on 17 November 2020, in the 3:0 home win over Estonia U21 in a UEFA European Championship qualifier.

Tombak made his debut for the Bulgaria national team on 8 June 2024 in a friendly against Slovenia at the Stožice Stadium. He played the full game in a 1–1 draw.

== Career statistics ==
As of 26 May 2026

Club	Division	Season	League		Cup		Continental		Total	
Club	Division	Season	Apps	Goals	Apps	Goals	Apps	Goals	Apps	Goals
Cherno More	First League	2016–17	1	0	0	0	—		1	0
Cherno More	First League	2017–18	3	0	1	0	—		4	0
Cherno More	First League	2018–19	0	0	0	0	—		0	0
Cherno More	First League	Total	4	0	1	0	0	0	5	0
Slavia Sofia	First League	2018–19	4	0	0	0	—		6	0
Slavia Sofia	First League	2019–20	3	0	0	0	—		3	0
Slavia Sofia	First League	2020–21	15	0	1	0	0	0	16	0
Slavia Sofia	First League	2021–22	25	0	4	0	—		29	0
Slavia Sofia	First League	2022–23	30	0	1	0	—		31	0
Slavia Sofia	First League	2023–24	34	1	2	0	—		36	1
Slavia Sofia	First League	2024–25	32	0	2	0	—		34	0
Slavia Sofia	First League	Total	143	1	10	0	0	0	153	1
Cherno More	First League	2025–26	15	0	1	0	—		16	0
Career statistics			162	1	12	0	0	0	174	1
