= Martin Kostadinov =

Bulgarian footballer (born 1996)

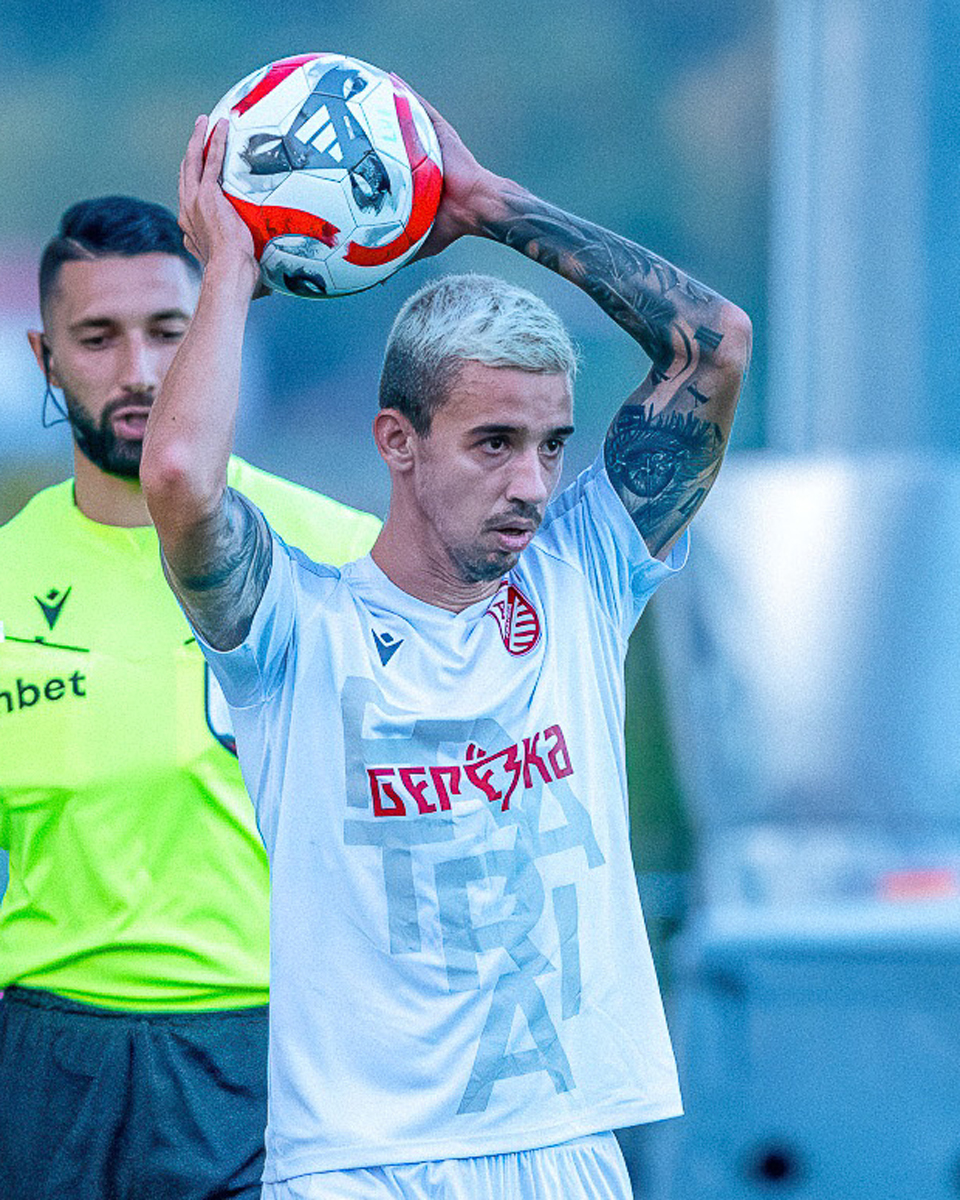
- Kostadinov playing for Fratria in 2024.

Personal information
- Full name: Martin Rosenov Kostadinov
- Date of birth: 13 May 1996 (age 30)
- Place of birth: Varna, Bulgaria
- Height: 1.78 m (5 ft 10 in)
- Positions: Left-back; winger

Team information
- Current team: Fratria
- Number: 17

Youth career
- 2007–2015: Cherno More

Senior career*
Years	Team	Apps	(Gls)
2014–2019	Cherno More	51	(1)
2019	→ Dunav Ruse (loan)	16	(0)
2020–2022	Arda	20	(0)
2020	→ Botev Vratsa (loan)	7	(0)
2021	→ Botev Vratsa (loan)	3	(0)
2022–2023	Dunav Ruse	16	(1)
2023–	Fratria	53	(5)

International career^{‡}
2014	Bulgaria U19	2	(0)
2017–2018	Bulgaria U21	11	(0)
- * Club domestic league appearances and goals as of 20:49, 31 October 2025 (UTC) ‡ National team caps and goals as of 16 October 2018

Martin Kostadinov (Bulgarian: Мартин Костадинов; born 13 May 1996) is a Bulgarian professional footballer who plays as a left back for Fratria.

== Career ==
In January 2014, Kostadinov was included in Cherno More's 25-man squad for their training camp in Turkey. Martin made his full first team début in a 4–0 away win against Lyubimets on 9 March 2014, playing as left back for 60 minutes. On 27 October 2015, he scored his first goal for the club in a 5–0 away win over Vihar Stroevo in the Bulgarian Cup. Kostadinov was used sparingly in the next two years following his début, but made significant progress during the 2016–17 season when he was named in the starting XI for 12 matches. Martin won the Man of the match award in the final two league fixtures, a 1–3 home defeat by Ludogorets Razgrad on 28 May 2017 and a 2–2 away draw against Levski Sofia on 31 May 2017, when he scored his first league goal.

Kostadinov started the 2017–18 season as first team regular, playing as left back. He won two consecutive Man of the match awards in the early rounds, a 1–0 home win over Dunav Ruse on 28 July, followed by a 1–1 away draw against Pirin Blagoevgrad on 4 August.

Kostadinov joined Arda Kardzhali in January 2020.

In August 2023 he moved to the newly promoted to Third League team Fratria. He had an important role for the team promoting to Second League, being a regular starter. For the 2024–25 season he ended the season with 3 goals and 8 assists, becoming an important player for the team. On 12 June 2025 he extended his contract with Fratria.

== International career ==
Martin was included in the Bulgaria U21 squad for the friendly against Macedonia U21 on 28 March 2017. He made his debut for the team, coming on as substitute for Georgi Yomov in the second half.

== Career statistics ==
=== Club ===
As of 3 November 2025

Club performance			League		Cup		Continental		Other		Total	
Club	League	Season	Apps	Goals	Apps	Goals	Apps	Goals	Apps	Goals	Apps	Goals
Bulgaria			League		Bulgarian Cup		Europe		Other		Total	
Cherno More	First League	2013–14	2	0	0	0	–		–		2	0
Cherno More	First League	2014–15	1	0	1	0	–		–		2	0
Cherno More	First League	2015–16	1	0	1	1	0	0	–		2	1
Cherno More	First League	2016–17	14	1	1	0	–		–		15	1
Cherno More	First League	2017–18	18	0	1	0	–		–		19	0
Cherno More	First League	2018–19	15	0	0	0	–		–		15	0
Cherno More	Total		51	1	4	1	0	0	0	0	55	2
Dunav Ruse (loan)	First League	2019–20	16	0	0	0	–		–		16	0
Arda	First League	2019–20	6	0	0	0	–		–		6	0
Arda	First League	2020–21	10	0	1	0	0	0	–		11	0
Arda	First League	2021–22	4	0	0	0	0	0	–		4	0
Arda	Total		20	0	1	0	0	0	0	0	21	0
Botev Vratsa (loan)	First League	2020–21	7	0	2	0	–		–		9	0
Botev Vratsa (loan)	First League	2021–22	3	0	0	0	–		–		3	0
Botev Vratsa (loan)	Total		10	0	2	0	0	0	0	0	12	0
Dunav Ruse	Second League	2022–23	16	1	0	0	–		–		16	1
Fratria	Third League	2023–24	20	2	0	0	–		–		20	2
Fratria	Second League	2024–25	30	3	1	0	–		0	0	31	3
Fratria	Second League	2025–26	3	0	2	0	–		–		5	0
Fratria	Total		53	5	3	0	0	0	0	0	56	5
Career statistics			166	7	10	0	0	0	0	0	176	7
