= Amadou Soukouna =

French football player (born 1992)

Personal information
- Full name: Amadou Soukouna
- Date of birth: 21 June 1992 (age 34)
- Place of birth: Nogent-sur-Marne, France
- Height: 1.82 m (6 ft 0 in)
- Positions: Striker; attacking midfielder

Team information
- Current team: Malappuram FC
- Number: 11

Youth career
- 2000–2008: Fontenay-sous-Bois
- 2008–2010: Toulouse

Senior career*
Years	Team	Apps	(Gls)
2010–2015	Toulouse	5	(1)
2012–2013	→ Luzenac (loan)	31	(4)
2013–2015	Toulouse II	19	(1)
2016	Vereya	27	(6)
2017	Levski Sofia	10	(1)
2017	Cherno More	8	(0)
2018–2020	Hapoel Petah Tikva	52	(22)
2020–2021	Hapoel Kfar Saba	40	(3)
2021–2023	Maritzburg United	46	(11)
2023–2024	Bangkok United	5	(0)
2024–2025	Cape Town City	25	(3)
2026	Rajasthan United	6	(4)

International career
2011	France U19	2	(0)
- * Club domestic league appearances and goals

Amadou Soukouna (born 21 June 1992) is a French professional footballer who plays as a forward. He was a French youth international having played at under-19 level.

== Career ==
Soukouna made his professional debut for Toulouse on 13 November 2010 in a league match against Montpellier in a 1–0 defeat. In the following week, he appeared as a first-half substitute in a 1–0 loss to Marseille.

On 7 April 2016, Soukouna signed with a Bulgarian club, Vereya. In January 2017, he was sold to Levski Sofia where he signed for 2.5 years. On 12 September 2017, he moved to Cherno More as free agent. Soukouna made his debut on 16 September in a 0–1 home defeat against CSKA Sofia, coming on as substitute for Atanas Zehirov. On 9 December 2017, his contract was terminated by mutual consent. In August 2018, Soukouna joined Israeli team Hapoel Petah Tikva, remaining with the club until the end of 2019. In 2021, Soukouna joined South African club Maritzburg United

== Honours ==
Bangkok United

- Thai FA Cup: 2023–24
