= Emanuel Lukanov =

Bulgarian footballer

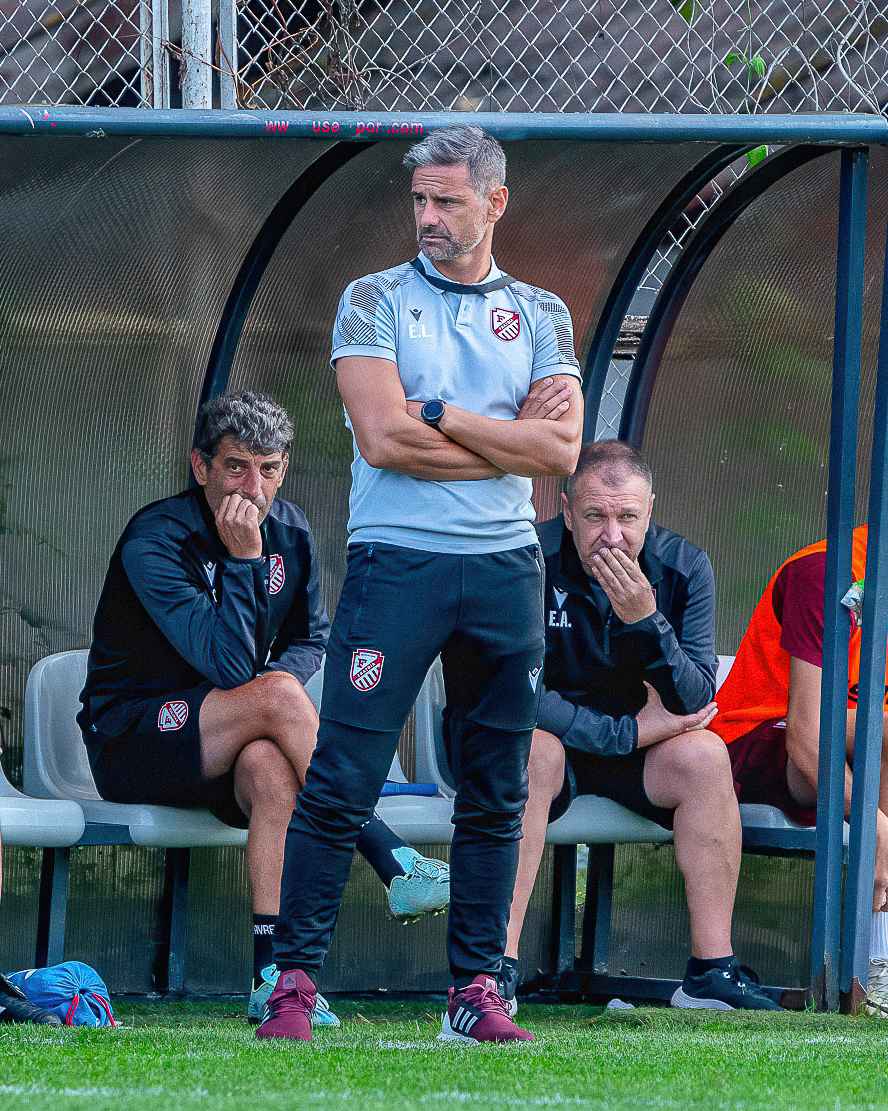

Personal information
- Date of birth: 25 May 1975 (age 51)
- Place of birth: Veliko Tarnovo, Bulgaria
- Height: 1.81 m (5 ft 11 in)
- Position: Defender

Team information
- Current team: Yantra Gabrovo (head coach)

Senior career*
Years	Team	Apps	(Gls)
1993–1998	Etar	73	(4)
1998–1999	Derthona	23	(0)
1999–2000	Etar	27	(0)
2000–2003	Pergocrema		
2003–2004	Chiari		
2004–2005	Castellana		
2005–2010	Nuova Verolese		

Managerial career
- 2010: Cherno More (youth coach)
- 2010–2017: Cherno More (assistant)
- 2017: Cherno More
- 2018–2019: Al-Qadsiah (assistant)
- 2020: Jagiellonia Białystok (assistant)
- 2021–2022: Beroe (assistant)
- 2022–2023: Etar Veliko Tarnovo
- 2024: Fratria
- 2025–2026: Yantra Gabrovo
- 2026: Dunav Ruse
- 2026–: Yantra Gabrovo
- * Club domestic league appearances and goals

Emanuel Lukanov (Bulgarian: Емануел Луканов; born 25 May 1975) is a Bulgarian retired football defender and current manager.

Lukanov has 8 caps for the Bulgaria U21 national side.

== Playing career ==
He was born on 25 May 1975 in Veliko Tarnovo. He is 181 cm tall and weighs 75 kg. He played for Etar and the Italian Derthona, Pergocrema, Chiari 1912, Nuova Verolese. Winner of the PFL Cup in 1995 with Etar. The "A" group played 73 games and scored 4 goals. There are 4 matches for Etar in the Intertoto tournament. Since the autumn of 2006 he has been playing coach of Nuova Verolise. In 2015 he won the Champion Cup of Bulgaria with Cherno More, as assistant coach of the representative team. He had a training session at UEFA campus in Nyon, Switzerland where he attended. Also was a coach in the first INTER Academy Camp 2018 in Bulgaria.

== Coach career ==
In July 2010, Lukanov began working as a coach at the Youth Academy of the Cherno More. In October that year he was recruited as an assistant of Stefan Genov in the first team. He worked for 7 years as assistant coach of the Cherno More, and during this period he also assisted Nikola Spasov, Adalbert Zafirov and Georgi Ivanov.

On 31 December 2016 Lukanov finished a coaching course and obtained a UEFA PRO license. In September 2017, he was confirmed as a senior coach of the Cherno More, replacing Georgi Ivanov's resignation.

In July 2018 INTER Academy made their first INTER Academy Camp in Bulgaria and he was one of the coaches.

In November 2018 he became part of the coach team of Ivaylo Petev in Saudi club Al-Qadsiah.

In January 2020, Lukanov started working in the coaching team of Petev in Jagiellonia Białystok. (till 1 September 2020)

In June 2021, he became part of the coach team in Beroe as an assistant & fitness coach.

On 6 June 2022, Lukanov was announced as the new manager of Etar Veliko Tarnovo.

On 5 October 2023, after leaving Etar Veliko Tarnovo manager position, he was announced as the new sports director of Fratria. He later served as manager of the team.
