= Nikolay Minkov =

Bulgarian footballer

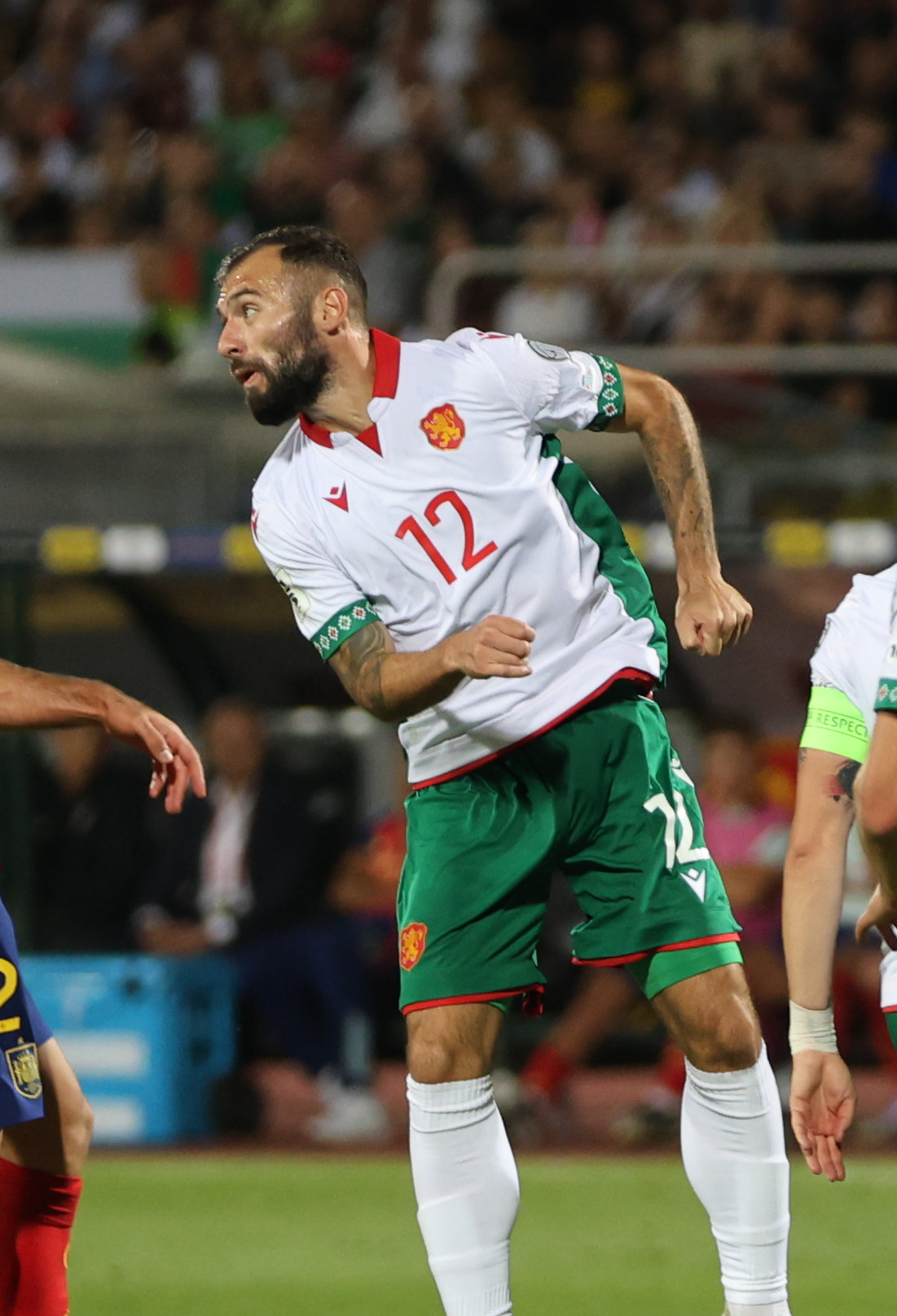

Personal information
- Full name: Nikolay Minkov Minkov
- Date of birth: 13 August 1997 (age 29)
- Place of birth: Silistra, Bulgaria
- Height: 1.72 m (5 ft 7 1/2 in)
- Positions: Attacking midfielder; right winger; right back

Youth career
- –2011: Cherno More
- 2011–2013: Litex Lovech
- 2013: Spartak Varna
- 2013–2015: Cherno More

Senior career*
Years	Team	Apps	(Gls)
2015–2018	Cherno More	25	(1)
2016	→ Dobrudzha (loan)	13	(3)
2018	CSKA 1948	6	(0)
2019	Dobrudzha	13	(2)
2019–2021	Montana	50	(5)
2021–2026	Botev Plovdiv	146	(11)

International career^{‡}
2013	Bulgaria U17	3	(0)
2015	Bulgaria U19	5	(0)
2018	Bulgaria U21	1	(0)
2024	Bulgaria	5	(0)
- * Club domestic league appearances and goals as of 11 June 2026 ‡ National team caps and goals as of 7 September 2025

Nikolay Minkov Minkov (Bulgarian: Николай Минков Минков; born 13 August 1997) is a Bulgarian footballer who plays as a right winger and right back.

== Career ==
=== Club ===
In January 2014, Minkov was included in Cherno More's 25-man squad for their training camp in Turkey. Nikolay made his full first team league début in a 1–2 home defeat against Lokomotiv Plovdiv on 26 May 2015, playing as striker. On 21 May 2017, he scored his first goal for Cherno More in a 1–2 away defeat by Lokomotiv Plovdiv. He won the Man of the match award despite the loss.

On 15 January 2016, Minkov joined Dobrudzha Dobrich on loan for the rest of the 2015–16 B Group season.

Minkov's contract expired at the end of the 2017–18 season and he left the club after refusing to sign an extension.

On 18 June 2018, Minkov signed with Second League club CSKA 1948.

On 1 July 2021, Minkov signed with First League club Botev Plovdiv.

=== International ===
In the autumn of 2024, he received his first call-up to the national team for the November UEFA Nations League matches against Luxembourg and Belarus, but did not make an appearance.

== Career statistics ==
As of 28 April 2018

Club	Season	League		Cup		Continental		Total	
Club	Season	Apps	Goals	Apps	Goals	Apps	Goals	Apps	Goals
Cherno More	2014–15	1	0	0	0	—		1	0
Dobrudzha Dobrich (loan)	2015–16	13	3	—		—		13	3
Cherno More	2016–17	10	1	2	0	—		12	1
Cherno More	2017–18	14	0	1	0	—		15	0
	Total	38	4	3	0	0	0	41	4

== Honours ==
Botev Plovdiv

- Bulgarian Cup: 2023–24

Individual

- Botev Plovdiv Player of the Year: 2025
- Plovdiv Footballer of the Year: 2025
