= Fabinho Martins =

Portuguese footballer (born 1996)

Personal information
- Full name: Fábio Alexandre Cruz Martins
- Date of birth: 10 February 1996 (age 30)
- Place of birth: Lisbon, Portugal
- Height: 1.81 m (5 ft 11 in)
- Position: Midfielder

Team information
- Current team: ASIL Lysi
- Number: 45

Youth career
- 2007–2009: Alverca
- 2009–2015: Sporting

Senior career*
Years	Team	Apps	(Gls)
2015–2017	Sporting B	23	(2)
2017	→ Sporting Covilhã (loan)	1	(0)
2018	Cherno More	6	(0)
2018–2019	Estoril	0	(0)
2019	Episkopi	11	(2)
2020–2021	Alverca	6	(1)
2021	AD Fafe	3	(0)
2021–2022	Olympias Lympion	0	(0)
2022	Karmiotissa	0	(0)
2023–2024	Penya Encarnada	22	(5)
2024–2025	Omonia 29M	15	(7)
2025	Digenis Akritas Morphou	3	(0)
2026–	ASIL Lysi	11	(3)
- * Club domestic league appearances and goals as of 3 May 2026

Fábio "Fabinho" Alexandre Cruz Martins (born 10 February 1996) is a Portuguese professional footballer who plays as a midfielder for Cypriot club ASIL Lysi.

== Career ==
On 26 April 2015, Fabinho made his professional debut with Sporting B in a 2014–15 Segunda Liga match against Oriental.

On 15 April 2018 he signed a short contract, until end of the season, with the Bulgarian First League team Cherno More Varna after a main player got injured. He completed his debut on 20 April 2018 in a league match against Slavia Sofia.

In August 2018, Fabinho signed contract with Estoril until 30 June 2020.

On 12 January 2024, Fabinho left Andorran Primera Divisió side Penya Encarnada and joined Cypriot Second Division club Omonia 29M until the end of the 2023–24 season. He scored 7 goals in 12 league appearances to help the club achieve promotion to the First Division.
