= Emil Mihaylov =

Bulgarian footballer

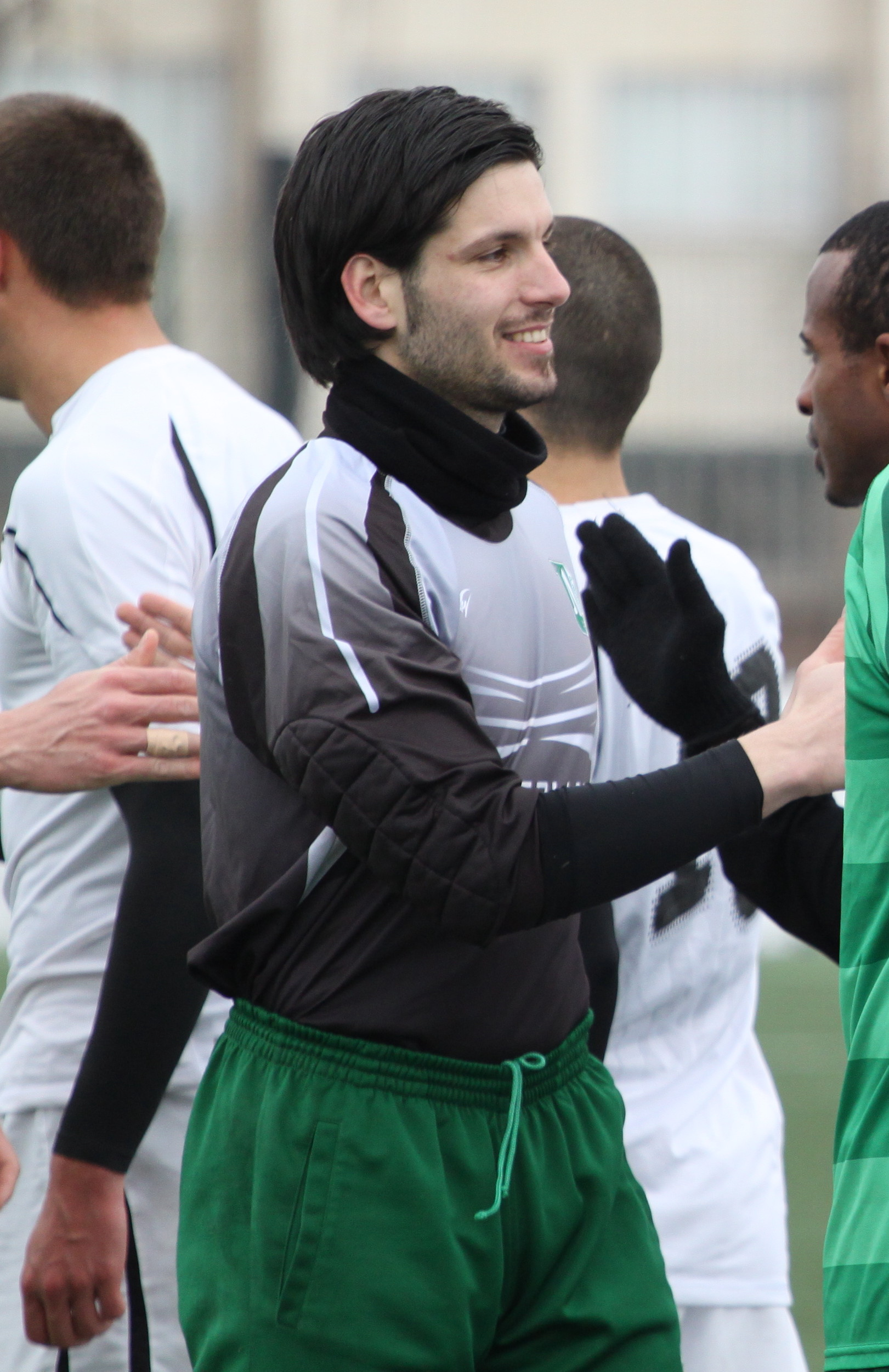
- Mihaylov playing for Ludogorets in 2011

Personal information
- Full name: Emil Emilov Mihaylov
- Date of birth: 1 March 1988 (age 38)
- Place of birth: Sofia, Bulgaria
- Height: 1.83 m (6 ft 0 in)
- Position: Goalkeeper

Youth career
- Slavia Sofia

Senior career*
Years	Team	Apps	(Gls)
2006–2009	Rilski Sportist	41	(3)
2010	Akademik Sofia	12	(0)
2011	Ludogorets Razgrad	6	(0)
2012	Lokomotiv Sofia	5	(0)
2013	Cherno More	3	(0)
2014–2015	Marek Dupnitsa	40	(0)
2015–2016	Omonia Aradippou	17	(0)
2016	Etar Veliko Tarnovo	15	(0)
2016–2017	Cherno More	29	(0)
2018–2019	CSKA 1948	36	(0)

Managerial career
- 2022–2023: Slavia Sofia (Goalkeeping Coach U18)
- 2023–2024: Montana (Goalkeeping Coach)
- 2025–: CSKA Sofia III (Goalkeeping Coach)
- * Club domestic league appearances and goals as of 12 December 2019

Emil Emilov Mihaylov (Bulgarian: Емил Емилов Михайлов; born 1 March 1988) is a Bulgarian footballer who plays as a goalkeeper.

== Career ==
On 4 October 2014, Mihaylov saved a penalty taken by Vladimir Gadzhev during the 1–1 draw of Marek Dupnitsa against Levski Sofia. Despite his excellent performance throughout the whole match Levski Sofia equalized from a second penalty which was taken by Miroslav Ivanov.

On 19 December 2017, Mihaylov joined Third League club CSKA 1948.
