= Iliya Milanov =

Bulgarian footballer (born 1992)

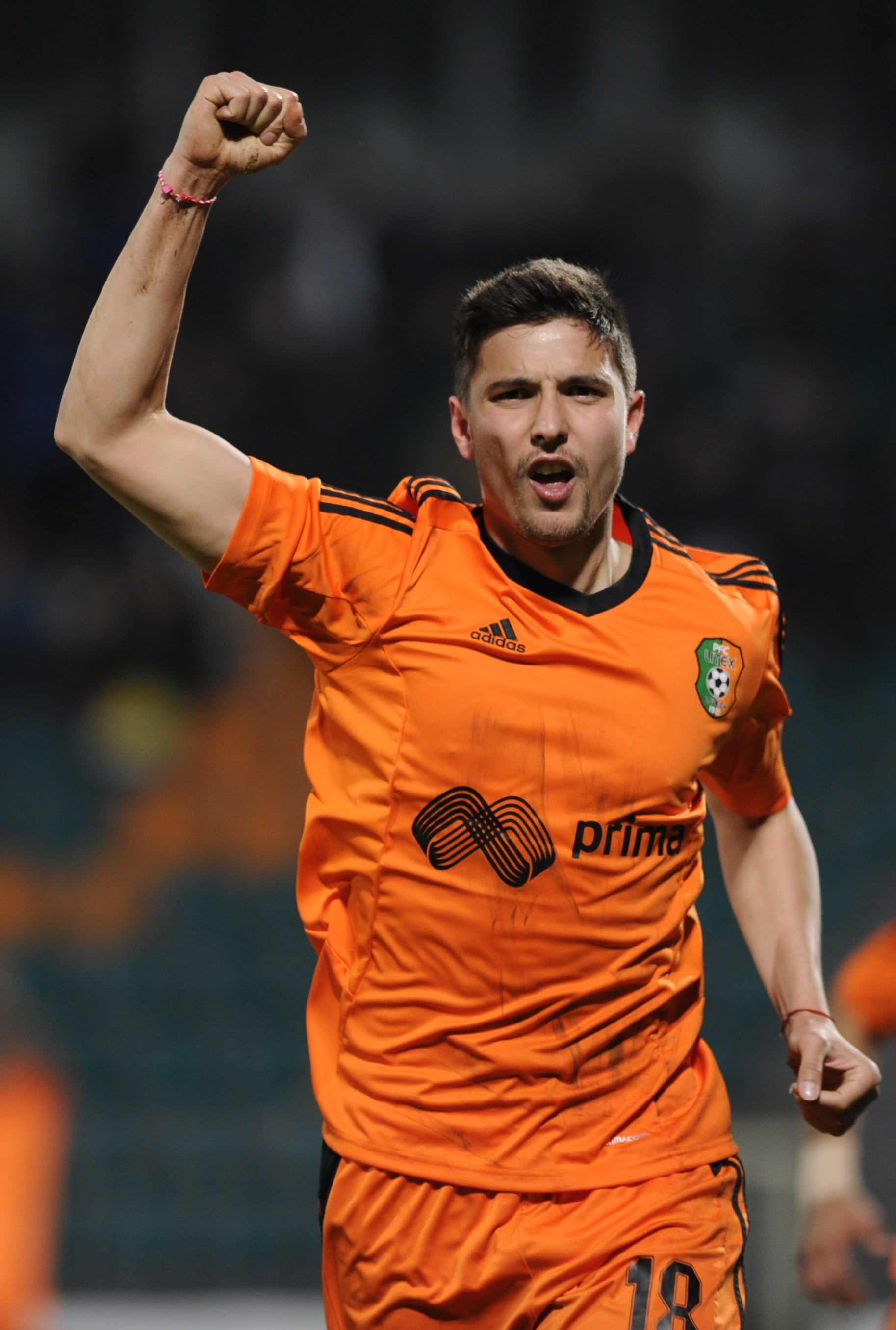
- Milanov with Litex Lovech in 2015

Personal information
- Full name: Iliya Ventsislavov Milanov
- Date of birth: 19 February 1992 (age 34)
- Place of birth: Levski, Bulgaria
- Height: 1.84 m (6 ft 1/2 in)
- Positions: Centre-back; right-back

Team information
- Current team: Rilski Sportist
- Number: 18

Youth career
- 2005–2009: Litex Lovech

Senior career*
Years	Team	Apps	(Gls)
2009–2015	Litex Lovech	94	(3)
2015	Litex Lovech II	5	(0)
2016	Beroe	17	(0)
2017	Neftochimic	9	(1)
2017	Cherno More	7	(0)
2018–2022	Botev Vratsa	101	(4)
2022	Septemvri Sofia	6	(0)
2023	Dunav Ruse	27	(0)
2024–	Rilski Sportist	41	(0)

International career
2011	Bulgaria U19	3	(0)
2011–2013	Bulgaria U21	11	(0)
2012–2016	Bulgaria	6	(0)
- * Club domestic league appearances and goals as of 13:40, 13 January 2026 (UTC)

Iliya Ventsislavov Milanov (Bulgarian: Илия Венциславов Миланов; born 19 February 1992) is a Bulgarian professional footballer who plays as a defender for Rilski Sportist Samokov. His twin brother Georgi Milanov is also a footballer.

== Career ==
=== Litex Lovech ===
Born in Levski, Pleven Province, Milanov began playing football at the local club, before joined the Litex Lovech Academy, together with his twin brother Georgi, in 2005. He was part of a group of young players at the club who guided the club to win the Bulgarian U-17 Championship in June 2009.

On 3 December 2009, Milanov made his Litex first-team debut in a 4–0 away win over Pirin Gotse Delchev in the Bulgarian Cup, coming on as a substitute in the 72nd minute. He made his league debut in a 4–2 away win against Sportist Svoge at Chavdar Tsvetkov Stadium on 16 May 2010, in the final game of the 2009–10 A PFG season, playing the full 90 minutes.

During the 2011–12 season, Milanov formed a partnership with Nikolay Bodurov in the centre of defence and has become an established first team player. On 20 April 2013, he hit his first goal, scoring header in the 2–1 home loss against Levski Sofia.

On 5 January 2016 it was announced that left the club by terminating his contract with paying 3 paychecks, but later the same day Litex said that this is not possible and he can't cancel his contract and can't leave the club as free agent until 31 July 2017 when his contract ends and if he wants to move in other club they have to pay transfer fee. Still, the player left the club even after Litex announced they will sue him.

=== Beroe Stara Zagora ===
On 1 March 2016 Milanov signed with Beroe Stara Zagora.

=== Neftochimic Burgas ===
On 12 February 2017 Milanov signed with Neftochimic Burgas. He made his debut for the team on 1 March 2017 after coming on as a substitute and scoring the equalizer for the 1:1 draw against Ludogorets Razgrad.

=== Cherno More ===
On 12 September 2017, Milanov signed with Cherno More. He made his debut on 20 September in a 1–2 away defeat by Montana in the Bulgarian Cup's first round.

=== Botev Vratsa ===
On 27 September 2018, Milanov signed with Botev Vratsa, after having been released from Cherno More at the end of the previous season.

=== Septemvri Sofia ===
After 4 seasons with Botev, Milanov moved to Septemvri Sofia in June 2022.

== International career ==
In 2010, Milanov was called up to the Bulgaria under-21 team for the first time, making his competitive debut on 3 March, in a 0–2 loss against Montenegro U21. He made his debut for the senior team on 12 October 2012 in a 1–1 draw against Denmark, substituting Georgi Iliev.

== Career statistics ==
=== Club ===
As of 25 October 2021

Club	Season	Division	League		Cup		Europe		Total	
Club	Season	Division	Apps	Goals	Apps	Goals	Apps	Goals	Apps	Goals
Litex Lovech	2009–10	A Group	1	0	1	0	0	0	2	0
Litex Lovech	2010–11	A Group	6	0	1	0	0	0	7	0
Litex Lovech	2011–12	A Group	21	0	4	0	3	0	28	0
Litex Lovech	2012–13	A Group	27	1	4	0	–		31	1
Litex Lovech	2013–14	A Group	25	0	1	0	–		26	0
Litex Lovech	2014–15	A Group	14	2	4	0	0	0	18	2
Litex Lovech	2015–16	A Group	0	0	1	0	0	0	1	0
Litex Lovech II	2015–16	B Group	5	0	–		–		5	0
Beroe	2015–16	A Group	4	0	0	0	0	0	4	0
Beroe	2016–17	First League	13	0	0	0	4	0	17	0
Neftochimic	2016–17	First League	9	1	2	1	–		11	2
Cherno More	2017–18	First League	7	0	1	0	–		8	0
Botev Vratsa	2018–19	First League	19	1	0	0	–		19	1
Botev Vratsa	2019–20	First League	28	2	1	0	–		29	2
Botev Vratsa	2020–21	First League	29	0	2	0	–		31	0
Botev Vratsa	2021–22	First League	26	1	0	0	–		26	1
Total	Bulgaria		234	8	22	1	7	0	263	9

== National team ==
Bulgaria national team
Year	Apps	Goals
2012	2	0
2013	3	0
2014	1	0
Total	6	0

== Honours ==
=== Litex Lovech ===
- Bulgarian A PFG (2): 2009–10, 2010–11
- Bulgarian Supercup (1): 2010
