= Tsvetelin Chunchukov =

Bulgarian footballer (born 1994)

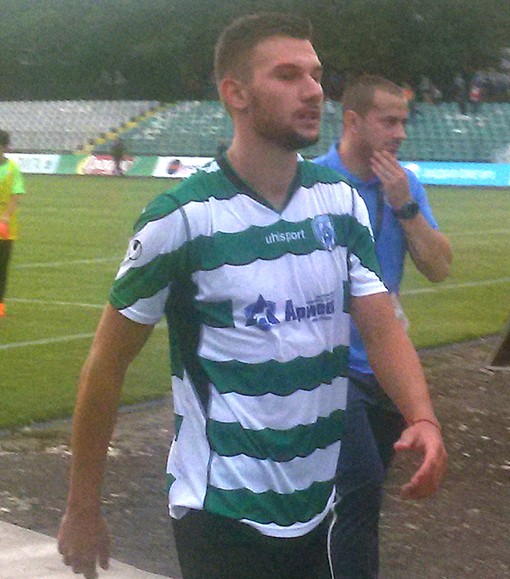

Personal information
- Full name: Tsvetelin Lukov Chunchukov
- Date of birth: 26 December 1994 (age 31)
- Place of birth: Pazardzhik, Bulgaria
- Height: 1.87 m (6 ft 2 in)
- Position: Forward

Youth career
- 2002–2011: Benkovski Pazardzhik
- 2011–2013: Levski Sofia

Senior career*
Years	Team	Apps	(Gls)
2013–2015	Botev Plovdiv	30	(5)
2013–2014	→ Rakovski (loan)	16	(1)
2015–2017	Ludogorets II	31	(8)
2015–2017	Ludogorets Razgrad	8	(0)
2017	Cherno More	9	(1)
2018–2021	Slavia Sofia	64	(15)
2020–2021	→ Academica Clinceni (loan)	31	(6)
2021–2022	Sepsi OSK	19	(1)
2022	→ Chindia Târgoviște (loan)	14	(0)
2022–2024	Steaua București	43	(8)
2024	Slavia Sofia	14	(1)
2025	Atyrau	23	(1)
2026	Spartak Varna	30	(3)

International career
2014–2016	Bulgaria U21	7	(1)
2019	Bulgaria	2	(0)
- * Club domestic league appearances and goals as of 11 November 2026

Tsvetelin Lukov Chunchukov (Bulgarian: Цветелин Луков Чунчуков; born 26 December 1994) is a Bulgarian professional footballer who plays as a forward.

== Club career ==
=== Early career ===
Born in Pazardzhik, Chunchukov began playing football for local side Benkovski. On 2 May 2010, at the age of 15 years and 4 months, he made his debut as a second-half substitute against Germanea Sapareva Banya in a game of the South-West V AFG, the third level of Bulgarian football. On 12 May, he scored his first goal in a 1–1 home draw against Malesh Mikrevo.

In 2011, Chunchukov was spotted by a Levski Sofia scout and joined the club as an academy player.

=== Botev Plovdiv ===
On 5 April 2013, Chunchukov joined Botev Plovdiv, signing first professional contract in his career. He signed a three-year deal with the club.

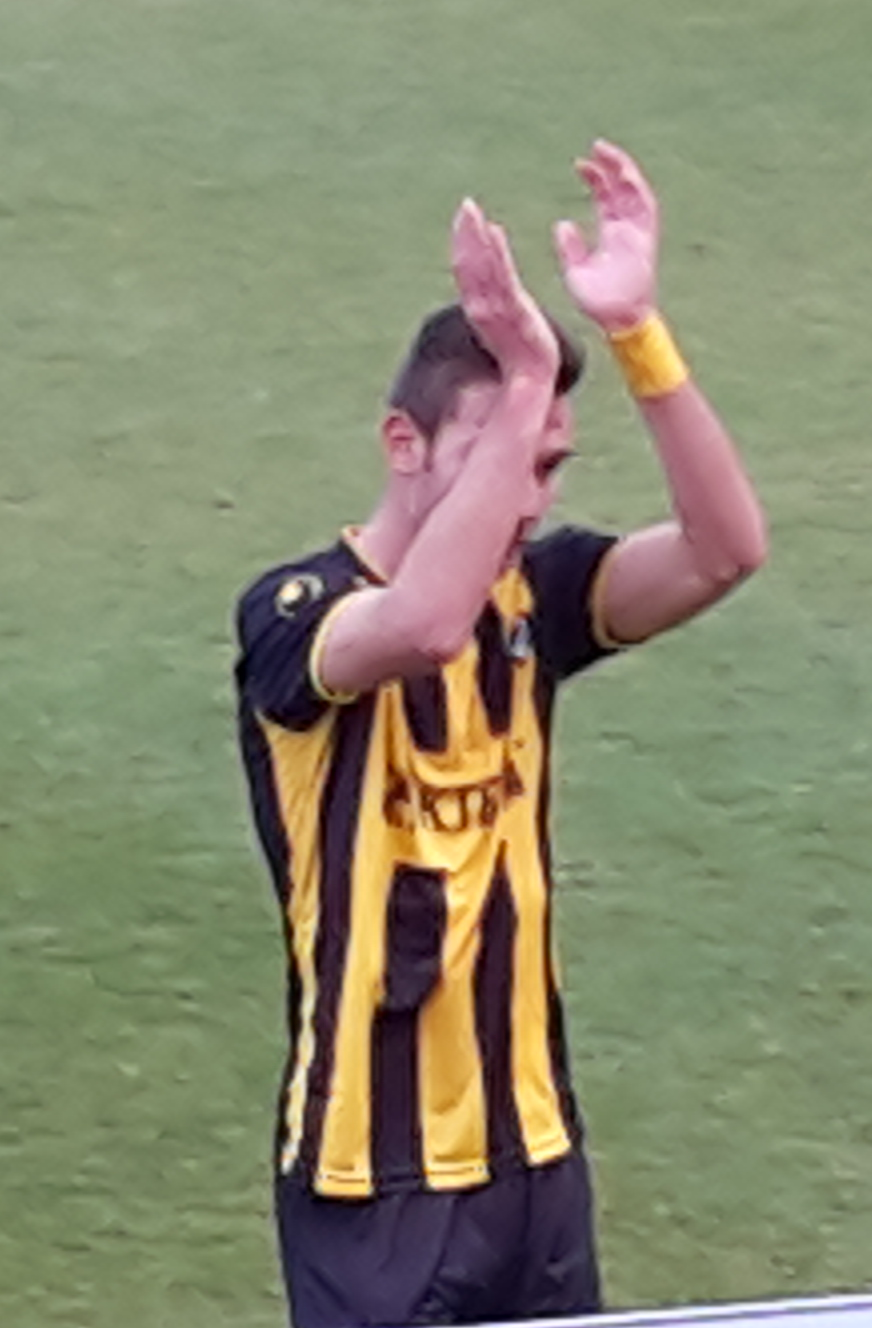
Chunchukov playing for Botev

Chunchukov made his debut for the first team of Botev Plovdiv during the 2014–15 season. He came on as a substitute in the first qualifying round of the 2014–15 UEFA Europa League against underdogs A.C. Libertas. Botev Plovdiv won this match 4–0. Chunchukov scored his first goal for Botev Plovdiv on 17 July 2014 during a 2–1 win against St. Pölten in the next round of Europa League. Three days after that Chunchukov was at the starting lineup against Lokomotiv Sofia and he made a debut in A Grupa. Botev Plovdiv won this game with 1–0 after a goal from a penalty kick which has given after a fault against Chunchukov.

Chunchukov scored his first goal in A Grupa on 17 August 2014. He opened the scoring in an away game against Levski Sofia but Botev Plovdiv lost the match with 2–1.

On 27 September Chunchukov scored a goal, provided an assist for the goal of Ivan Tsvetkov and was among the best players on the pitch during the derby match against Lokomotiv Plovdiv. Botev Plovdiv achieved a 2–0 home win.

Chunchukov scored his third goal in A Grupa on 19 October but Lokomotiv Sofia defeated Botev Plovdiv 3–1.

After a seven-game goal drought, Chunchukov scored again on 7 December 2014 against PFC Haskovo.

Chunchukov scored again in the next round of A Grupa which was the first official game for 2015. He netted the opening goal and assisted for the last goal during the 3–0 home win over PFC Marek Dupnitsa. In the next round Chunchukov played during the 2–0 win over the local rivals Lokomotiv Plovdiv, missed the game with CSKA Sofia due to a ban, and on 22 March he was again in the starting lineup for 0–0 draw with Ludogorets Razgrad.

On 18 April Chunchukov came on as a substitute and made an assist during the 1–1 draw with Beroe Stara Zagora. A month later, on 23 May, he made an assist again versus the same team. Despite his efforts this time Botev Plovdiv was defeated with 2–1 during the visit to Beroe Stara Zagora.

At the end of the season, Chunchukov was announced as the A Group Youth Player of the Year for his contributions to the club. His teammate Milen Gamakov was named runner-up in the same contest.

==== Rakovski (loan) ====
Chunchukov was loaned by Botev Plovdiv to Rakovski and spent 2013–14 season in the B Group. He appeared in 16 matches for the club, scoring goals against Bansko and Dobrudzha Dobrich, the latter of which came in a match for the Bulgarian Cup.

=== Ludogorets ===
On 23 June 2015, Chunchukov was transferred from Botev Plovdiv to Ludogorets Razgrad for an undisclosed fee, considered to be in the range of 175 000 EUR, as reported by several Bulgarian media outlets. On 1 July Chunchukov scored the only goal for his new team in a 1–0 friendly win against Romanian club Universitatea Craiova.

Unfortunately, on 4 October 2016, Chunchukov broke his left leg foot during a training session of the Bulgaria U21 team and as a result, he was ruled out from the squad for several months. After recovery, he spent most of his playing time at Ludogorets's reserve squad in the Bulgarian Second League. He was released from the club on 7 June 2017.

=== Cherno More ===
On 19 June 2017 he signed with Cherno More Varna. On 15 July, he made his debut in a 1–0 home win over Vitosha Bistritsa. He scored his first goal on 21 July in a 4–0 away win over Vereya. On 14 December 2017, his contract was terminated by mutual consent.

=== Slavia Sofia ===
On 28 December 2017, Chunchukov signed with Slavia Sofia.

== International career ==
Chunchukov made his debut for Bulgaria U21 in the 2–2 draw with Estonia U21 on 3 September 2014, contributing with a goal. On 31 March 2015 he played during the first half of the 1–3 away defeat from Wales U21.

On 25 March 2016 Chunchukov came on as a substitute during the goalless draw with Wales U21.

He made his debut for the senior national team on 7 June 2019 in a Euro 2020 qualifier against the Czech Republic, as an 82nd-minute substitute for Todor Nedelev.

== Personal life ==
In an interview for Botev Plovdiv's club channel Chunchukov stated that he was encouraged to play football by his grandfather and has no favorite foreign football club.

== Career statistics ==
=== Club ===
As of 13 May 2022

Appearances and goals by club, season and competition
Club	Season	League			National cup		Continental		Other		Total	
Club	Season	Division	Apps	Goals	Apps	Goals	Apps	Goals	Apps	Goals	Apps	Goals
Rakovski	2013–14	B Group	16	1	2	1	–		–		18	2
Botev Plovdiv	2014–15	A Group	30	5	2	0	3	1	1	0	36	6
Ludogorets Razgrad II	2015–16	B Group	14	2	–		–		–		14	2
Ludogorets Razgrad II	2016–17	Vtora Liga	17	6	–		–		–		17	6
Ludogorets Razgrad II	Total		31	8	0	0	–		–		31	8
Ludogorets Razgrad	2015–16	A Group	5	0	0	0	2	0	0	0	7	0
Ludogorets Razgrad	2016–17	Bulgarian First League	3	0	1	0	0	0	0	0	4	0
Ludogorets Razgrad	Total		8	0	1	0	2	0	0	0	11	0
Cherno More	2017–18	Bulgarian First League	9	1	0	0	–		–		9	1
Slavia Sofia	2017–18	Bulgarian First League	8	0	3	0	–		–		11	0
Slavia Sofia	2018–19	Bulgarian First League	32	11	2	1	3	0	0	0	37	12
Slavia Sofia	2019–20	Bulgarian First League	23	4	1	2	–		–		24	6
Slavia Sofia	2020–21	Bulgarian First League	1	0	0	0	–		–		1	0
Slavia Sofia	Total		64	15	6	3	3	0	0	0	73	18
Academica Clinceni	2020–21	Liga I	31	6	0	0	–		–		31	6
Sepsi OSK	2021–22	Liga I	19	1	2	0	2	0	–		23	1
Chindia Târgoviște (loan)	2021–22	Liga I	14	0	–		–		–		14	0
Career total			222	37	13	4	10	1	1	0	246	42

== Honours ==
Ludogorets Razgrad

- Bulgarian First League: 2015–16, 2016–17

Slavia Sofia

- Bulgarian Cup: 2017–18

Individual

- A Group Young Player of the Year: 2014–15
