= Filip Mihaljević (footballer, born 1992) =

Croatian footballer

Personal information
- Date of birth: 9 March 1992 (age 34)
- Place of birth: Zagreb, Croatia
- Height: 1.80 m (5 ft 11 in)
- Position: Forward

Team information
- Current team: Tikvesh

Youth career
- Špansko

Senior career*
Years	Team	Apps	(Gls)
2011–2017	Dinamo Zagreb II	16	(5)
2011–2012	→ Sesvete (loan)	22	(7)
2012–2013	→ Lokomotiva (loan)	0	(0)
2013–2014	→ Sesvete (loan)	25	(6)
2014	→ Široki Brijeg (loan)	7	(2)
2015	→ Slaven Koprivnica (loan)	16	(2)
2016	→ Sesvete (loan)	11	(8)
2017	Lokomotiva	4	(0)
2018	Lokomotiv Plovdiv	17	(5)
2018–2020	Widzew Łódź	17	(3)
2020	Visakha	15	(13)
2021	Seregno	15	(1)
2021–2022	Kustošija	9	(2)
2022	Finn Harps	36	(6)
2023–2024	GOŠK Gabela	39	(5)
2025–	Tikvesh	5	(0)

International career
2011	Croatia U-20	1	(0)
- * Club domestic league appearances and goals as of 19 August 2024

Filip Mihaljević (born 9 March 1992) is a Croatian professional footballer who plays as a forward for Macedonian First Football League club Tikvesh. He played for Cambodian club Visakha in 2020.
