= Dani Kiki =

Bulgarian footballer

Personal information
- Full name: Dani Ayman Kiki
- Date of birth: 8 January 1988 (age 38)
- Place of birth: Plovdiv, Bulgaria
- Height: 1.78 m (5 ft 10 in)
- Positions: Attacking midfielder; winger

Youth career
- 1995–2003: Botev 2002
- 2003–2006: Spartak Plovdiv

Senior career*
Years	Team	Apps	(Gls)
2006–2011	Lokomotiv Plovdiv	84	(7)
2011	Chernomorets Burgas	2	(0)
2012	Rakovski	4	(1)
2013	Lokomotiv Sofia	2	(0)
2013–2017	Lokomotiv Plovdiv	113	(16)
2018–2020	Cherno More	48	(6)
2021	Levski Krumovgrad		
Total		253	(30)

International career
2007–2009	Bulgaria U21	5	(0)
- * Club domestic league appearances and goals as of 24 December 2020

Dani Ayman Kiki (Bulgarian: Дани Айман Кики; born 8 January 1988) is a retired Bulgarian professional footballer, who played as a midfielder. He is of Syrian Kurdish descent, as his father is from Syria.

== Career ==
=== Early career ===
Kiki started to play football in the private junior football academy Botev 2002 in Plovdiv. His first coach was Marin Bakalov. In 2004, at the age of 16, he went to Spartak Plovdiv.

=== Lokomotiv Plovdiv ===
In 2006, only 18 years old, Dani Kiki signed his first professional contract with Lokomotiv Plovdiv.

Kiki made his official debut in the Bulgarian first division in a match against Lokomotiv Sofia on 17 September 2006 as a 77th-minute substitute and played for 13 minutes. The result of the match was a 0:2 loss for The Smurfs.

Six days later, Kiki scored his first goal for Lokomotiv Plovdiv against PFC Chernomorets Burgas Sofia. He netted a goal in the 90th minute. The result of the match was a 6:0 win for Loko.

On 31 October 2009, he was involved in a brawl, along with several other players, following his team's 0–1 loss to Botev Plovdiv.

=== Chernomorets Burgas ===
After a five-year spell at Lauta and some problems with the club, Kiki was released from Lokomotiv Plovdiv. He relocated to Burgas, to sign a contract with Chernomorets Burgas. He was released in January 2012.

=== Return to Lokomotiv Plovdiv ===
On 29 October 2016 he scored the winning goal for Lokomotiv Plovdiv in the game against CSKA Sofia.

=== Cherno More Varna ===
On 16 January 2018 Kiki joined Cherno More Varna after he had left Lokomotiv Plovdiv in the end of 2017.

=== Krumovgrad ===
In July 2021, Kiki joined Levski Krumovgrad.

== Career statistics ==
As of 1 July 2019

Club performance			League		Cup		Continental		Other (Note: Includes Bulgarian Supercup matches.)		Total	
Club	League	Season	Apps	Goals	Apps	Goals	Apps	Goals	Apps	Goals	Apps	Goals
Lokomotiv Plovdiv	A Group	2006–07	17	2	4	2	–		–		21	4
Lokomotiv Plovdiv	A Group	2007–08	24	0	2	0	–		–		26	0
Lokomotiv Plovdiv	A Group	2008–09	10	3	0	0	–		–		10	3
Lokomotiv Plovdiv	A Group	2009–10	19	2	0	0	–		–		19	2
Lokomotiv Plovdiv	A Group	2010–11	14	0	1	0	–		–		15	0
Chernomorets Burgas	A Group	2011–12	2	0	0	0	–		–		2	0
Rakovski	V AFG	2011–12	4	1	0	0	–		–		4	1
Lokomotiv Sofia	A Group	2012–13	2	0	0	0	–		–		2	0
Lokomotiv Plovdiv	A Group	2013–14	22	2	4	0	–		–		26	2
Lokomotiv Plovdiv	A Group	2014–15	24	3	4	0	–		–		27	3
Lokomotiv Plovdiv	A Group	2015–16	21	3	2	0	–		–		23	3
Lokomotiv Plovdiv	First League	2016–17	33	6	2	0	–		–		35	6
Lokomotiv Plovdiv	First League	2017–18	13	2	1	0	–		–		14	2
Cherno More	First League	2017–18	9	1	0	0	–		–		9	1
Cherno More	First League	2018–19	22	4	1	0	–		–		23	4
Cherno More	First League	2019–20	0	0	0	0	–		–		0	0
Career total			236	29	21	2	0	0	0	0	257	31

== International career ==
In November 2007 of that time the Bulgarian national under-21 coach Aleksandar Stankov called Kiki up for Bulgaria national under-21 football team for a matches with England U21 and Ireland U21. On 16 November 2007, on stadium:mk in Milton Keynes he made his official debut for Bulgaria U21 against England U21. For Bulgaria U21, Kiki was capped five times.
