= Mehdi Fennouche =

Algerian footballer (born 1993)

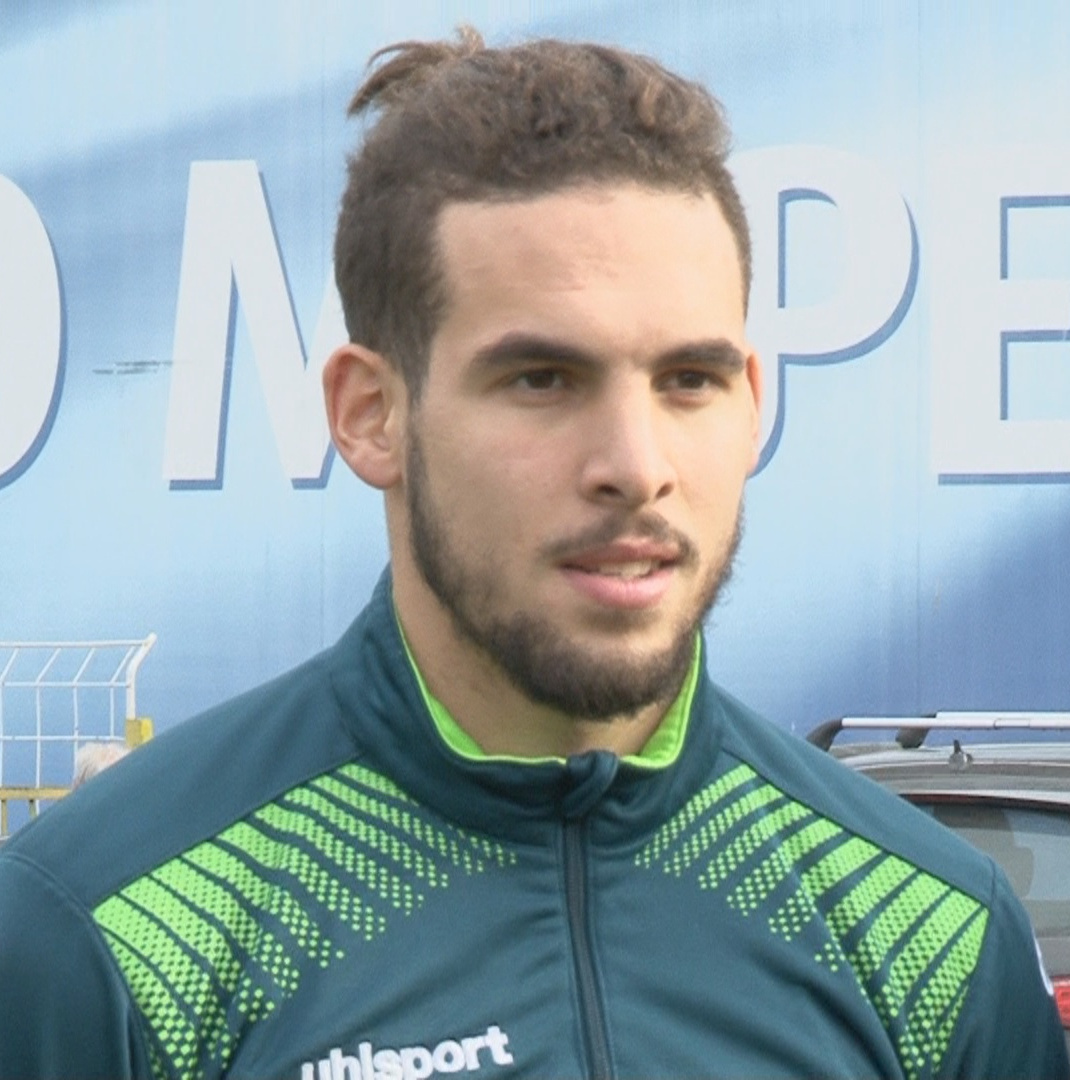

Personal information
- Full name: Mehdi Fennouche
- Date of birth: February 20, 1993 (age 33)
- Place of birth: Paris, France
- Height: 1.80 m (5 ft 11 in)
- Positions: Winger; forward

Youth career
- 2001–2008: ES Parisienne
- 2008–2012: JA Drancy

Senior career*
Years	Team	Apps	(Gls)
2012–2014	Toulouse II	35	(8)
2013–2014	Toulouse	2	(0)
2014–2016	Tubize	43	(5)
2017	Lokomotiv GO	5	(0)
2017	Vereya	16	(3)
2018–2019	Cherno More	34	(3)
2020	Louhans-Cuiseaux	4	(0)
Total		139	(19)

International career
2012–2013	Algeria U20	2	(1)
- * Club domestic league appearances and goals

Mehdi Fennouche (born 20 February 1993) is a former professional footballer who played as a winger or forward. Born in France, he represents Algeria at youth level.

== Career ==
He made his professional debut for Toulouse on September 20, 2013, against Saint-Étienne, replacing Wissam Ben Yedder in the 82nd minute. Fennouche represented Algeria at the under-20 level, participating in the 2012 UNAF U-20 Tournament. He signed for AFC Tubize on 1 September 2014.

In January 2017, Fennouche signed for Bulgarian First League club Lokomotiv Gorna Oryahovitsa. He left the club at the end of the season following the relegation to Second League and joined fellow top flight club Vereya in July 2017, after a successful trial period.

On 8 January 2018, Fennouche signed with Cherno More, another Bulgarian club. On 17 February, he made his debut in a 1–4 home defeat by Beroe.
