= Atanas Zehirov =

Bulgarian footballer

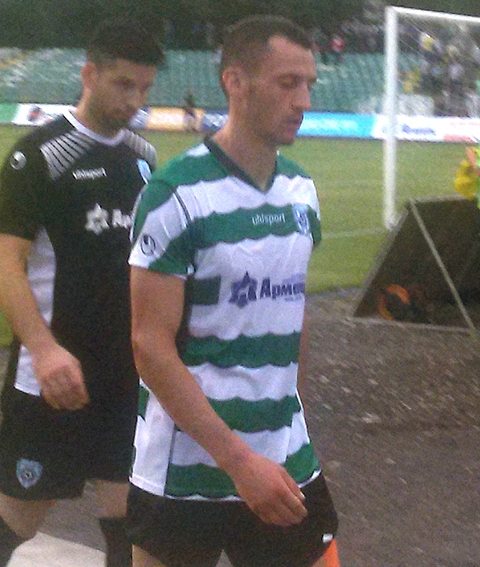

Personal information
- Full name: Atanas Tsankov Zehirov
- Date of birth: 13 February 1989 (age 37)
- Place of birth: Kochan, Bulgaria
- Height: 1.80 m (5 ft 11 in)
- Positions: Right back; right winger

Team information
- Current team: Asenovets

Senior career*
Years	Team	Apps	(Gls)
2008–2010	CSKA Sofia	6	(1)
2010	→ Sliven (loan)	5	(0)
2011	Pirin Blagoevgrad	1	(0)
2011–2012	Hasle-Løren IL	22	(6)
2013–2017	Beroe Stara Zagora	92	(10)
2017–2018	Cherno More	38	(2)
2019	Botev Plovdiv	5	(0)
2020–2021	Botev Vratsa	39	(0)
2021–2023	Arda Kardzhali	19	(0)
2023–2024	Spartak Varna	23	(3)
2025–	Asenovets	23	(3)

International career
- Bulgaria U19
2008–2009	Bulgaria U21	4	(0)
2017	Bulgaria	1	(0)
- * Club domestic league appearances and goals as of 12:05, 20 June 2026 (UTC)

Atanas Zehirov (Bulgarian: Атанас Зехиров; born 13 February 1989) is a Bulgarian professional footballer who plays as a right back and right winger for Asenovets Asenovgrad.

== Career ==
=== Early career ===
Zehirov began his career with CSKA Sofia, but made only six league appearances with one goal and spent time on loan to Sliven 2000 before leaving the club in October 2010. He scored his first and last goal for the club against Lokomotiv Mezdra on 13 June 2009.

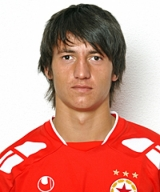
Zehirov with CSKA in 2009

On 31 January 2011, Zehirov signed as a free agent with Pirin Blagoevgrad, but made only one league appearance, as a substitute, before being released at the end of the season.

In August 2011, Zehirov joined Norwegian side Hasle-Løren IL.

=== Beroe ===
On 7 February 2013, Zehirov signed a two-and-a-half-year deal with Beroe Stara Zagora. During his time with the club he primarily has been used in the defence as a right-back. Zehirov made his debut on 22 May 2013, replacing Martin Raynov for the last 13 minutes of a 2–1 away win over Lokomotiv Plovdiv. On 1 March 2014, Zehirov scored his first league goal for Beroe in a 5–0 home win over Lyubimets 2007, scoring the fourth of their five goals.

In the 2014–15 season, Zehirov became Beroe's first-choice right-back. On 8 May 2015, he signed a new two-year extension to his contract. He left the club in May 2017 after his contract expired.

=== Cherno More ===
On 1 June 2017, Zehirov agreed to join Cherno More, but the official contract was signed two weeks later. On 15 July, he made his debut in a 1–0 home win over Vitosha Bistritsa, playing as a right winger. On 11 August 2017, he scored his first goal for the club in a 1–1 home draw with Slavia Sofia. Zehirov won the Man of the match award in that game.

== International career ==
On 26 May 2015, Zehirov received his first call-up to the Bulgaria national team for the friendly game against Turkey on 8 June 2015 in Istanbul from Ivaylo Petev, but did not make an appearance. He was called up in November 2016 for a 2018 World Cup qualifier against Belarus national team, during which he remained on the bench. On 3 September 2017, Zehirov made his debut in a 1–3 away defeat by the Netherlands, a 2018 FIFA World Cup qualifier.

== Career statistics ==
As of 21 January 2019

Club	Season	Division	League		Cup		Europe		Total	
Club	Season	Division	Apps	Goals	Apps	Goals	Apps	Goals	Apps	Goals
CSKA Sofia	2008–09	A Group	5	1	0	0	–		5	1
CSKA Sofia	2009–10	A Group	1	0	0	0	1	0	2	0
Sliven 2000 (loan)	2009–10	A Group	5	0	0	0	–		5	0
Pirin Blagoevgrad	2010–11	A Group	1	0	0	0	–		1	0
Hasle-Løren IL	2011	2. divisjon	12	1	0	0	–		12	1
Hasle-Løren IL	2012	3. divisjon	10	5	0	0	–		10	5
Beroe	2012–13	A Group	2	0	1	0	–		3	0
Beroe	2013–14	A Group	26	3	3	1	0	0	29	4
Beroe	2014–15	A Group	19	2	3	0	–		22	2
Beroe	2015–16	A Group	18	4	2	0	4	0	24	4
Beroe	2016–17	First League	25	1	0	0	0	0	25	1
Cherno More	2017–18	First League	32	2	1	0	–		33	2
Cherno More	2018–19	First League	6	0	2	1	–		8	1
Botev Plovdiv	2018–19	First League	0	0	0	0	–		0	0
Career Total			162	19	12	2	5	0	179	21

== Honours ==
=== Club ===
Beroe

- Bulgarian Cup (1): 2012–13
- Bulgarian Supercup (1): 2013
