= 2017–18 FC Vitosha Bistritsa season =

Vitosha Bistritsa
2017–18 season
- Chairman: Sergey Tashkov
- Manager: Kostadin Angelov
- Stadium: Bistritsa Stadium
- First League: 13th
- Bulgarian Cup: First Round
- Top goalscorer: League: Grigor Dolapchiev (5); Stefan Hristov (5); All: Grigor Dolapchiev (5); Stefan Hristov (5)
- Biggest win: 1-0 v. Cherno More (28 April 2018); 2-1 v. Pirin Blagoevgrad (21 May 2018)
- Biggest defeat: 1-6 v. CSKA Sofia (19 August 2017)
Home colours	Away colours

The 2017–18 season is Vitosha Bistritsa's first season in the Bulgarian First League after they won 1-0 the play-off promotion/relegation match against Neftochimic Burgas on June 3, 2017, on Trace Arena in Stara Zagora. Paul Otofe scored the most important goal in the club's history.

== Squad ==
No.	Name	Nationality	Position(s)	Age	EU	Since	Signed From
97	Hristiyan Vasilev	Bulgaria	GK	29	EU	2016	Slavia Sofiа
12	Nikolay Georgiev	Bulgaria	GK	28	EU	2018	Septemvri Sofia (Youth team)
2	Todor Gochev	Bulgaria	LB/LWB	33	EU	2017	Botev Vratsa
3	Yordan Varbanov	Bulgaria	CB	46	EU	2013	Lokomotiv Sofia
4	Kristiyan Uzunov	Bulgaria	CB	37	EU	2015	Oborishte Panagyurishte
5	Ventsislav Bonev	Bulgaria	CB/LB	46	EU	2015	Minyor Pernik
6	Rumen Gyonov	Bulgaria	RB/RWB	34	EU	2014	Germanea Sapareva Banya
7	Kristiyan Kochilov	Bulgaria	CM	36	EU	2015	Slivnishki Geroy
9	Angel Stoyanov	Bulgaria	AM/SS	39	EU	2011	Levski Dragalevtsi
10	Georgi Amzin	Bulgaria	CM/AM	34	EU	2014	Slivnishki Geroy
11	Daniel Kutev	Bulgaria	LW/SS	35	EU	2017	Nestos Chrysoupoli
14	Chetin Sadula (captain)	Bulgaria	CM/RM/AM	39	EU	2013	Lokomotiv Plovdiv
15	Radko Mutafchiyski	Bulgaria	CB	34	EU	2017	Apollon Larissa
17	Mihail Petrov	Bulgaria	DM	40	EU	2015	Slivnishki Geroy
18	Petko Tsankov	Bulgaria	RW/RWB/LWB	30	EU	2017	Chernomorets Balchik
19	Dimitar Atanasov	Bulgaria	LB/LW	27	EU	2017	Vitosha Bistritsa (Youth team)
24	Nikolay Hristozov	Bulgaria	CB	44	EU	2016	Lokomotiv Mezdra
25	Georgi Angelov	Bulgaria	CB/DM	36	EU	2018	Levski Sofia
30	Iliyan Popov	Bulgaria	LB/CB	28	EU	2017	Levski Sofia (Youth team)
45	Grigor Dolapchiev	Bulgaria	CF	32	EU	2017	Spartak Pleven
66	Orlin Starokin	Bulgaria	DM/LWB/LB	39	EU	2018	Cherno More
77	Daniel Peev (vice-captain)	Bulgaria	AM/LW	42	EU	2017	Lokomotiv Sofia
80	Lachezar Kotev	Bulgaria	AM/RW	28	EU	2016	Septemvri Sofia
88	Ivaylo Lazarov	Bulgaria	CM/AM	34	EU	2016	Chernomorets Balchik
99	Stefan Hristov	Bulgaria	CF	37	EU	2017	Spartak Pleven

== Fixtures ==
Win Draw Loss Upcoming fixture

=== Regular season ===
15 July 2017 1	Cherno More	1 – 0	Vitosha Bistritsa	Kavarna
	Georgi Iliev (yellow card) 54'; Georgi Bozhilov 63'; Nikolay Minkov (yellow card) 89'; Emil Mihaylov (yellow card) 89'	Report	Rumen Gyonov (yellow card) 54'	Stadium: Kavarna Stadium; Referee: Stanislav Todorov; Man of the Match: Georgi Bozhilov

21 July 2017 2	Vitosha Bistritsa	1 – 1	Etar	Sofia
	Todor Gochev (yellow card) 43'; Grigor Dolapchiev 38', (yellow card) 47'; Yordan Varbanov (yellow card) 62'; Kristiyan Kochilov (yellow card) 65'; Daniel Kutev (yellow card) 73'; Iliyan Popov (yellow card) 90'	Report	Ivan Petkov 30', (yellow card) 31'; Sasho Aleksandrov (yellow card) 45'; Ventsislav Vasilev (yellow card) 90+3'	Stadium: Vasil Levski National Stadium; Referee: Vladimir Valkov; Man of the Match: Grigor Dolapchiev

30 July 2017 3	Levski	2 – 0	Vitosha Bistritsa	Sofia
	Antonio Vutov 2'; Sergiu Buș 57'	Report	Paul Otofe (yellow card) 48'	Stadium: Vivacom Arena – Georgi Asparuhov Stadium; Referee: Nikolay Yordanov; Man of the Match: Antonio Vutov

5 August 2017 4	Vitosha Bistritsa	2 – 4	Ludogorets	Sofia
	Grigor Dolapchiev 4', 36'; Iliyan Popov (yellow card) 35'; Rumen Gyonov (yellow card) 71'; Yordan Varbanov (yellow card) 75'	Report	Virgil Misidjan 12'; Cicinho (yellow card) 33'; Cosmin Moți 38' (pen.); Gustavo Campanharo 73'; Juninho Quixadá (yellow card) 75', (goal) 85'	Stadium: Vasil Levski National Stadium; Referee: Dragomir Draganov; Man of the Match: Grigor Dolapchiev

14 August 2017 5	Lokomotiv Plovdiv	3 – 1	Vitosha Bistritsa	Plovdiv
	Dino Martinović 4'; Parvizdzhon Umarbayev 37'; Dani Kiki 67'	Report	Stefan Hristov 9'; Grigor Dolapchiev (yellow card) 17'; Kristiyan Uzunov (yellow card) 23'; Kitan Vasilev (yellow card) 82'	Stadium: Lokomotiv Stadium; Referee: Angel Bayaltsaliev; Man of the Match: Parvizdzhon Umarbayev

19 August 2017 6	CSKA Sofia	6 – 1	Vitosha Bistritsa	Sofia
	Bozhidar Chorbadzhiyski 5', 39'; Fernando Karanga 13'; Tiago Rodrigues 54'; Stoycho Atanasov (yellow card) 67'; Rúben Pinto 78'; Kévin Koubemba 90'	Report	Petko Tsankov (yellow card) 44'; Grigor Dolapchiev 61'	Stadium: Balgarska Armia Stadium; Referee: Stanislav Stavrov; Man of the Match: Tiago Rodrigues

28 August 2017 7	Vitosha Bistritsa	0 – 3	Vereya	Bistritsa
	Rumen Gyonov (yellow card) 63'	Report	Mehdi Fennouche 33', (yellow card) 60'; Ventsislav Bengyuzov 69', (yellow card) 86'; Georgi Andonov 83'	Stadium: Bistritsa Stadium; Referee: Angel Angelov

10 September 2017 8	Dunav	3 – 0	Vitosha Bistritsa	Ruse
	Vasil Shopov 5'; Miroslav Budinov 42' (pen.), 83' (pen.)	Report	Rumen Gyonov (yellow card) 14'; Nikolay Hristozov (yellow card) 40'; Kristiyan Kochilov (yellow card) 83'	Stadium: Gradski Stadium; Referee: Ivaylo Stoyanov – the Wedding; Man of the Match: Vasil Shopov

17 September 2017 9	Vitosha Bistritsa	0 – 0	Pirin Blagoevgrad	Bistritsa
	Ivaylo Lazarov (yellow card) 78'	Report	Todor Trayanov (yellow card) 61'; Radoslav Kirilov (yellow card) 72'; Anton Kostadinov (yellow card) 84'; Aymen Souda (yellow card) 89'	Stadium: Bistritsa Stadium; Referee: Nedelcho Gadzhalov; Man of the Match: Blagoy Makendzhiev

23 September 2017 10	Slavia	4 – 0	Vitosha Bistritsa	Sofia
	Andrea Hristov 38'; Ivaylo Dimitrov 67'; Emil Martinov 84'; Nasko Milev 90+2'	Report	Stefan Hristov (yellow card) 42'; Todor Gochev (yellow card) 47'	Stadium: Vasil Levski National Stadium; Referee: Petar Kirilov; Man of the Match: Galin Ivanov

30 September 2017 11	Vitosha Bistritsa	2 – 4	Botev Plovdiv	Bistritsa
	Daniel Peev 6' (pen.), (yellow card) 36'; Ivaylo Lazarov (yellow card) 44'; Petko Tsankov 66'; Rumen Gyonov (yellow card) 86'; Nikolay Hristozov (yellow card) 88'	Report	Fernando Viana 2', 53'; Steven Petkov 90+2'; Lazar Marin 90+5'	Stadium: Bistritsa Stadium; Referee: Dragomir Draganov; Man of the Match: Fernando Viana

16 October 2017 12	Septemvri	1 – 0	Vitosha Bistritsa	Sofia
	Martin Toshev 63'; Yanko Sandanski (yellow card) 74'; Boris Galchev (yellow card) 87'	Report	Petko Tsankov (yellow card) 40'; Kitan Vasilev (yellow card) 57'; Angel Stoyanov (yellow card) 85'; Chetin Sadula (yellow card) 86'	Stadium: Vasil Levski National Stadium; Referee: Vladimir Valkov; Man of the Match: Martin Toshev

22 October 2017 13	Vitosha Bistritsa	0 – 1	Beroe	Bistritsa
	Dimitar Pantaleev (yellow card) 43'; Radko Mutafchiyski (yellow card) 71'	Report	Pedro Eugenio 14'; Martin Raynov (yellow card) 49'; Carlos Ohene (yellow card) 74'	Stadium: Bistritsa Stadium; Referee: Nedelcho Gadzhalov; Man of the Match: Pedro Eugenio

27 October 2017 14	Vitosha Bistritsa	1 – 2	Cherno More	Bistritsa
	Daniel Peev 45'	Report	Mariyan Ognyanov 33', 55', (yellow card) 81'; Anton Ognyanov (yellow card) 61'	Stadium: Bistritsa Stadium; Referee: Georgi Kabakov; Man of the Match: Mariyan Ognyanov

4 November 2017 15	Etar	2 – 0	Vitosha Bistritsa	Veliko Tarnovo
	Sasho Aleksandrov 28', (yellow card) 61'; Alioune Badará 71'; Ivan Stoyanov (yellow card) 86'; Plamen Galabov (yellow card) 90'	Report	Dimitar Pantaleev (yellow card) 81'; Radko Mutafchiyski (yellow card) 90+1'	Stadium: Ivaylo Stadium; Referee: Vladimir Valkov; Man of the Match: Sasho Aleksandrov

17 November 2017 16	Vitosha Bistritsa	0 – 0	Levski	Sofia
	Petko Tsankov (yellow card) 42'; Mihail Ivanov (yellow card) 74'; Daniel Peev (yellow card) 75'	Report	Jordi Gómez (penalty missed) 44'; Hólmar Eyjólfsson (yellow card) 90+2'	Stadium: Vasil Levski National Stadium; Referee: Georgi Davidov; Man of the Match: Mihail Ivanov

27 November 2017 17	Ludogorets	3 – 0	Vitosha Bistritsa	Razgrad
	Claudiu Keșerü (yellow card) 42', (goal) 52'; Virgil Misidjan (yellow card) 47', (goal) 64'; Gustavo Campanharo 68'; Georgi Terziev (yellow card) 71'	Report	Radko Mutafchiyski (yellow card) 17'; Daniel Kutev (yellow card) 48', (red card) 63'	Stadium: Ludogorets Arena; Referee: Vladimir Valkov; Man of the Match: Claudiu Keșerü

30 November 2017 18	Vitosha Bistritsa	1 – 1	Lokomotiv Plovdiv	Sofia
	Ivaylo Lazarov 9', (yellow card) 73'; Kristiyan Uzunov (yellow card) 16'	Report	Dimo Bakalov 10'	Stadium: Vasil Levski National Stadium; Referee: Petar Dorovski; Man of the Match: Dimo Bakalov

3 December 2017 19	Vitosha Bistritsa	0 – 2	CSKA Sofia	Sofia
		Report	Raoul Loé 42'; Kiril Despodov 88'	Stadium: Vasil Levski National Stadium; Referee: Stanislav Stavrov; Man of the Match: Kiril Despodov

10 December 2017 20	Vereya	1 – 1	Vitosha Bistritsa	Stara Zagora
	Georgi Andonov (yellow card) 3'; Valeri Domovchiyski 83'	Report	Petko Tsankov (yellow card) 5'; Ivaylo Lazarov 32'; Grigor Dolapchiev (yellow card) 33'	Stadium: Trace Arena; Referee: Nikolay Kolev; Man of the Match: Ivaylo Lazarov

19 February 2018 21	Vitosha Bistritsa	1 – 2	Dunav	Bistritsa
	Lachezar Kotev (yellow card) 23'; Ivaylo Lazarov 45'; Radko Mutafchiyski (yellow card) 59'	Report	Vasil Shopov 30', 60'; Nassim Zitouni (yellow card) 90+2'	Stadium: Bistritsa Stadium; Referee: Volen Chinkov; Man of the Match: Vasil Shopov

25 February 2018 22	Pirin Blagoevgrad	1 – 0	Vitosha Bistritsa	Blagoevgrad
	Conor Henderson 22'; Rumen Sandev (yellow card) 35'; Georgi Georgiev (yellow card) 71'; Andi Renja (yellow card) 81'	Report	Lachezar Kotev (yellow card) 34'; Orlin Starokin (yellow card) 69'	Stadium: Hristo Botev Stadium; Referee: Vladimir Valkov; Man of the Match: Conor Henderson

4 March 2018 23	Vitosha Bistritsa	1 – 1	Slavia	Bistritsa
	Daniel Peev 67'; Grigor Dolapchiev (yellow card) 85'; Hristiyan Vasilev (yellow card) 90+1'	Report	Milcho Angelov 90+3'	Stadium: Bistritsa Stadium; Referee: Georgi Dimitrov; Man of the Match: Daniel Peev

7 March 2018 24	Botev Plovdiv	3 – 0	Vitosha Bistritsa	Plovdiv
	Todor Nedelev 5', (penalty missed) 18'; João Paulo 23'; Steven Petkov 79'	Report	Kristiyan Uzunov (yellow card) 5'; Lachezar Kotev (yellow card) 60'; Rumen Gyonov (yellow card) 85'	Stadium: Botev 1912 Football Complex; Referee: Petar Kostadinov; Man of the Match: Joao Paulo

11 March 2018 25	Vitosha Bistritsa	0 – 0	Septemvri	Bistritsa
	Kristiyan Kochilov (yellow card) 70'; Chetin Sadula (yellow card) 76'	Report	Martin Toshev (yellow card) 20'	Stadium: Bistritsa Stadium; Referee: Stanislav Stavrov; Man of the Match: Valentin Galev

17 March 2018 26	Beroe	0 – 0	Vitosha Bistritsa	Stara Zagora
	Rúben Brígido (yellow card) 13'	Report	Angel Stoyanov (yellow card) 81'; Grigor Dolapchiev (yellow card) 83'	Stadium: Beroe Stadium; Referee: Vladimir Valkov; Man of the Match: Martin Kamburov

==== Table ====
Pos	Team	Pld	W	D	L	GF	GA	GD	Pts	Qualification
10	Cherno More	26	7	6	13	24	32	−8	27	Qualification for the Relegation round
11	Pirin Blagoevgrad	26	6	8	12	20	28	−8	26	Qualification for the Relegation round
12	Dunav Ruse	26	5	6	15	17	38	−21	21 (Note: Dunav Ruse ahead of Etar on head-to-head record; Dunav Ruse–Etar 0–0, Etar–Dunav Ruse 0–2.)	Qualification for the Relegation round
13	Etar	26	4	9	13	24	45	−21	21	Qualification for the Relegation round
14	Vitosha Bistritsa	26	0	8	18	12	51	−39	8	Qualification for the Relegation round

Source: Soccerway
Rules for classification: 1) Points; 2) Head-to-head points; 3) Head-to-head goal difference; 4) Head-to-head goals scored; 5) Head-to-head away goals scored (only if two teams); 6) Goal difference; 7) Goals scored; 8) Fairplay ranking; 9) Draw.

=== Relegation stage ===
30 March 2018 27	Slavia	0 – 0	Vitosha Bistritsa	Sofia
		Report	Kristiyan Kochilov (yellow card) 42'; Petko Tsankov (yellow card) 67'; Daniel Peev (yellow card) 86', (red card) 87'; Nikolay Georgiev (yellow card) 90+4'	Stadium: Vasil Levski National Stadium; Referee: Petar Kostadinov; Man of the Match: Petko Tsankov

5 April 2018 28	Vitosha Bistritsa	1 – 3	Pirin Blagoevgrad	Bistritsa
	Stefan Hristov 26'; Lachezar Kotev (yellow card) 34'; Grigor Dolapchiev (penalty missed) 59'; Todor Gochev (yellow card) 79'	Report	Dimitar Mitev (yellow card) 35'; Florent Bodjaj 45+1', 70'; Kostadin Nichev (yellow card) 51'; Todor Trayanov (yellow card) 58'; Andi Renja (yellow card) 64', (goal) 83'; Lyubomir Tsolev (yellow card) 68'	Stadium: Bistritsa Stadium; Referee: Georgi Kabakov; Man of the Match: Florent Bodjaj

13 April 2018 29	Cherno More	2 – 0	Vitosha Bistritsa	Varna
	Radoslav Vasilev 19', 32'; Stefan Stanchev (yellow card) 26'	Report		Stadium: Ticha Stadium; Referee: Volen Chinkov; Man of the Match: Radoslav Vasilev

17 April 2018 30	Vitosha Bistritsa	1 – 2	Slavia	Bistritsa
	Petko Tsankov (yellow card) 57'; Angel Stoyanov (yellow card) 78'; Orlin Starokin 83'; Radko Mutafchiyski (yellow card) 87'	Report	Ivaylo Dimitrov 12'; Kostadin Velkov (yellow card) 50'; Galin Ivanov 54'; Tsvetelin Chunchukov (yellow card) 71'; Stefan Velkov (yellow card) 74'	Stadium: Bistritsa Stadium; Referee: Nedelcho Gadzhalov; Man of the Match: Galin Ivanov

22 April 2018 31	Pirin Blagoevgrad	2 – 2	Vitosha Bistritsa	Blagoevgrad
	Rumen Sandev (yellow card) 20'; Yulian Popev 35'; Anton Kostadinov (yellow card) 43'; Florent Bodjaj 78'; Manol Chapov (yellow card) 83'; Andi Renja (yellow card) 88'	Report	Angel Stoyanov 4', (yellow card) 14'; Georgi Angelov (yellow card) 33'; Stefan Hristov 67', (yellow card) 68'; Rumen Gyonov (yellow card) 81'; Daniel Peev (yellow card) 87'	Stadium: Hristo Botev Stadium; Referee: Vladimir Valkov; Man of the Match: Stefan Hristov

28 April 2018 32	Vitosha Bistritsa	1 – 0	Cherno More	Bistritsa
	Daniel Peev 36' (pen.); Kristiyan Kochilov (yellow card) 52'; Petko Tsankov (yellow card) 69'	Report		Stadium: Bistritsa Stadium; Referee: Georgi Davidov; Man of the Match: Daniel Peev

==== Table ====
Pos	Team	Pld	W	D	L	GF	GA	GD	Pts	Qualification or relegation
1	Slavia Sofia	32	11	10	11	44	44	0	43	Qualification for the Europa League first qualifying round (Note: Slavia Sofia qualified for the Europa League first qualifying round by winning the 2017–18 Bulgarian Cup.)
2	Cherno More	32	11	7	14	33	35	−2	40	Qualification for the European play-off quarter-finals
3	Pirin Blagoevgrad (R)	32	7	9	16	29	42	−13	30	Qualification for the relegation play-offs
4	Vitosha Bistritsa (O)	32	1	10	21	17	60	−43	13	Qualification for the relegation play-offs

Source: Soccerway
Rules for classification: 1) Points; 2) Head-to-head points; 3) Head-to-head goal difference; 4) Head-to-head goals scored; 5) Head-to-head away goals scored (only if two teams); 6) Goal difference; 7) Goals scored; 8) Fairplay ranking; 9) Draw.
(O) Play-off winners; (R) Relegated

=== Relegation play-offs ===
6 May 2018 First round 1st leg	Vitosha Bistritsa	0 – 1	Dunav	Bistritsa
	Kristiyan Kochilov (yellow card) 31'; Todor Gochev (yellow card) 64'; Ventsislav Bonev (yellow card) 67'; Petko Tsankov (yellow card) 90+2'	Report	Bircent Karagaren 48'; Vasil Shopov (yellow card) 61'; Diyan Dimov (yellow card) 79'; Martin Lukov (yellow card) 81'	Stadium: Bistritsa Stadium; Referee: Stanislav Todorov; Man of the Match: Bircent Karagaren

14 May 2018 First round 2nd leg	Dunav	3 – 1 (4 – 1 agg.)	Vitosha Bistritsa	Ruse
	Diyan Dimov (yellow card) 5'; Bircent Karagaren 22', 29'; Vasil Shopov 40'; Petar Patev (yellow card) 56'	Report	Ventsislav Bonev (yellow card) 6'; Rumen Gyonov (yellow card) 14', (red card) 60'; Stefan Hristov 85' (pen.)	Stadium: Gradski Stadium; Referee: Ivaylo Stoyanov – the Wedding; Man of the Match: Bircent Karagaren

17 May 2018 Second round 1st leg	Vitosha Bistritsa	0 – 1	Pirin Blagoevgrad	Bistritsa
	Grigor Dolapchiev (yellow card) 39'	Report	Conor Henderson (yellow card) 12'; Yulian Popev 57', (yellow card) 90+2'; Metodiy Stefanov (yellow card) 61'; Radoslav Kirilov (yellow card) 63'	Stadium: Bistritsa Stadium; Referee: Angel Bayaltsaliev; Man of the Match: Yulian Popev

21 May 2018 Second round 2nd leg	Pirin Blagoevgrad	1 – 2 (2 – 2 (a) agg.)	Vitosha Bistritsa	Blagoevgrad
	Yulian Popev (yellow card) 32'; Andi Renja (yellow card) 64'; Kostadin Nichev 66'; Todor Palankov (yellow card) 81'	Report	Rumen Gyonov (yellow card) 41'; Radko Mutafchiyski (yellow card) 44', (goal) 60'; Ivaylo Lazarov (yellow card) 58'; Grigor Dolapchiev 63'; Petko Tsankov (yellow card) 63', (red card) 90+1'; Mihail Petrov (yellow card) 71'; Nikolay Georgiev (yellow card) 74'; Daniel Kutev (yellow card) 82'; Georgi Angelov (yellow card) 83'	Stadium: Hristo Botev Stadium; Referee: Stanislav Todorov; Man of the Match: Radko Mutafchiyski

25 May 2018 Third round	Vitosha Bistritsa	2 – 2 (a.e.t.) (4 – 2 p)	Lokomotiv Sofia	Plovdiv
	Georgi Angelov (yellow card) 3'; Mihail Petrov (yellow card) 8'; Rumen Gyonov (yellow card) 34'; Ivaylo Lazarov (yellow card) 41', (red card) 81'; Grigor Dolapchiev (yellow card) 51'; Todor Gochev (yellow card) 56'; Daniel Kutev 60', (yellow card) 107'; Stefan Hristov 120+3'	Report	Iliya Dimitrov 4'; Tom (yellow card) 23'; Ivo Ivanov (yellow card) 33'; Aleksandar Goranov (yellow card) 44'; Vladimir Semerdzhiev (yellow card) 88'; Zdravko Dimitrov 109', (yellow card) 110'; Martin Stankev (yellow card) 114'; Kristiyan Katsarev (yellow card) 120'	Stadium: Lokomotiv Stadium; Referee: Nikola Popov
	Penalties
	Kristiyan Kochilov (penalty scored); Georgi Angelov (penalty scored); Lachezar Kotev (penalty scored); Stefan Hristov (penalty scored)		Martin Stankev (penalty scored); Zdravko Dimitrov (penalty missed); Vladimir Semerdzhiev (penalty missed); Aleksandar Goranov (penalty scored)

=== Bulgarian Cup ===
20 September 2017 First round	Litex	1 – 0	Vitosha Bistritsa	Lovech
	Ivan Ivanov (yellow card) 39'; Ivaylo Radentsov 68' (pen.); Tonislav Yordanov (yellow card) 65'	Report	Ventsislav Bonev (yellow card) 22'; Dimitar Pantaleev (yellow card) 36'; Yordan Varbanov (yellow card) 68'; Kristiyan Kochilov (yellow card) 90+2'	Stadium: Lovech Stadium; Referee: Georgi Ginchev

== Squad statistics ==
As of match played 25 May 2018

No.	Pos	Nat	Player	Total		Parva Liga		Bulgarian Cup	
No.	Pos	Nat	Player	Apps	Goals	Apps	Goals	Apps	Goals
97	GK	(Bulgaria) BUL	Hristiyan Vasilev	11	0	10	0	1	0
12	GK	(Bulgaria) BUL	Nikolay Georgiev	12	0	12	0	0	0
2	DF	(Bulgaria) BUL	Todor Gochev	23	0	18+4	0	0+1	0
3	DF	(Bulgaria) BUL	Yordan Varbanov	16	0	13+2	0	1	0
4	DF	(Bulgaria) BUL	Kristiyan Uzunov	17	0	15+2	0	0	0
5	DF	(Bulgaria) BUL	Ventsislav Bonev	10	0	7+2	0	1	0
6	DF	(Bulgaria) BUL	Rumen Gyonov	33	0	33	0	0	0
7	MF	(Bulgaria) BUL	Kristiyan Kochilov	26	0	21+4	0	1	0
9	MF	(Bulgaria) BUL	Angel Stoyanov	16	1	8+8	1	0	0
10	MF	(Bulgaria) BUL	Georgi Amzin	17	0	3+13	0	1	0
11	FW	(Bulgaria) BUL	Daniel Kutev	17	1	10+6	1	1	0
14	MF	(Bulgaria) BUL	Chetin Sadula	25	0	13+12	0	0	0
15	DF	(Bulgaria) BUL	Radko Mutafchiyski	19	1	19	1	0	0
17	MF	(Bulgaria) BUL	Mihail Petrov	17	0	11+6	0	0	0
18	MF	(Bulgaria) BUL	Petko Tsankov	30	1	27+3	1	0	0
19	MF	(Bulgaria) BUL	Dimitar Atanasov	2	0	0+1	0	0+1	0
24	DF	(Bulgaria) BUL	Nikolay Hristozov	27	0	23+3	0	1	0
25	DF	(Bulgaria) BUL	Georgi Angelov	15	0	15	0	0	0
30	DF	(Bulgaria) BUL	Iliyan Popov	3	0	1+1	0	1	0
45	FW	(Bulgaria) BUL	Grigor Dolapchiev	22	5	17+5	5	0	0
66	MF	(Bulgaria) BUL	Orlin Starokin	13	1	12+1	1	0	0
77	MF	(Bulgaria) BUL	Daniel Peev	34	4	23+10	4	0+1	0
80	MF	(Bulgaria) BUL	Lachezar Kotev	16	0	16	0	0	0
88	MF	(Bulgaria) BUL	Ivaylo Lazarov	26	3	24+2	3	0	0
99	FW	(Bulgaria) BUL	Stefan Hristov	30	5	22+8	5	0	0
Players away from the club on loan:
33	GK	(Bulgaria) BUL	Nikolay Radev	3	0	3	0	0	0
16	MF	(Bulgaria) BUL	Dimitar Pantaleev	6	0	4+1	0	1	0
Players who left Vitosha Bistritsa during the season:
1	GK	(Bulgaria) BUL	Mihail Ivanov	12	0	12	0	0	0
25	FW	(Nigeria) NGR	Paul Otofe	12	0	8+3	0	1	0
80	FW	(Bulgaria) BUL	Kitan Vasilev	8	0	4+3	0	1	0
