= 2018–19 FC Vitosha Bistritsa season =

Vitosha Bistritsa
2018–19 season
- Chairman: Sergei Tashkov
- Manager: Rosen Kirilov
- Stadium: Bistritsa Stadium
- First league: 13th
- Bulgarian Cup: Second round
- Top goalscorer: League: Grigor Dolapchiev (6); All: Grigor Dolapchiev (6)
Home colours	Away colours

The 2018–19 season is Vitosha Bistritsa's second consecutive season in the Bulgarian First League after they won play-offs against Pirin Blagoevgrad (0:1 home loss and 2:1 away win with goals of Radko Mutafchiyski and Grigor Dolapchiev and Lokomotiv Sofia (2:2 after extra time with goals by Daniel Kutev and Stefan Hristov, and 4:2 after penalties).

== Squad ==
No.	Name	Nationality	Position(s)	Age	EU	Since	Signed From
Goalkeepers
1	Hristiyan Vasilev	Bulgaria	GK	29	EU	2016	Slavia Sofiа
12	Nikolay Georgiev	Bulgaria	GK	28	EU	2018	Septemvri Sofia
Defenders
2	Todor Gochev	Bulgaria	LB/LWB	33	EU	2017	Botev Vratsa
4	Kristiyan Uzunov	Bulgaria	CB/DM	37	EU	2015	Oborishte Panagyurishte
5	Ventsislav Bonev	Bulgaria	CB/LB	46	EU	2015	Minyor Pernik
6	Rumen Gyonov	Bulgaria	RB/RWB	34	EU	2014	Germanea Sapareva Banya
16	Radko Mutafchiyski	Bulgaria	CB	34	EU	2017	Apollon Larissa
18	Petko Tsankov	Bulgaria	RWB/LWB/LW/RW	30	EU	2017	Chernomorets Balchik
22	Mihail Milchev	Bulgaria	CB	38	EU	2018	Botev Vratsa
24	Georgi Kupenov	Bulgaria	CB	29	EU	2018	Botev Plovdiv
93	Yulian Popev	Bulgaria	LB/RB	40	EU	2019	Pirin Blagoevgrad
Midfielders
7	Kristiyan Kochilov	Bulgaria	CM	36	EU	2015	Slivnishki Geroy
9	Angel Stoyanov	Bulgaria	AM/SS	39	EU	2011	Levski Dragalevtsi
10	Georgi Amzin (vice-captain)	Bulgaria	CM/AM	34	EU	2014	Slivnishki Geroy
14	Chetin Sadula (captain)	Bulgaria	LW/AM/RW	39	EU	2013	Lokomotiv Plovdiv
17	Mihail Petrov	Bulgaria	DM	40	EU	2015	Slivnishki Geroy
23	Emil Gargorov	Bulgaria	AM	45	EU	2019	CSKA 1948
77	Ivan Valchanov	Bulgaria	AM/LW	35	EU	2018	Etar
80	Lachezar Kotev	Bulgaria	AM/RW	28	EU	2016	Septemvri Sofia
88	Ivaylo Lazarov	Bulgaria	DM/AM	34	EU	2016	Chernomorets Balchik
Forwards
11	Daniel Kutev	Bulgaria	LW	35	EU	2017	Nestos Chrysoupoli
45	Grigor Dolapchiev	Bulgaria	CF	32	EU	2017	Spartak Pleven
96	Nasko Milev	Bulgaria	CF	30	EU	2018	Slavia Sofia
99	Stefan Hristov	Bulgaria	LW/RW/CF	37	EU	2017	Spartak Pleven

== Fixtures ==
Win Draw Loss Upcoming fixture

=== Regular season ===
20 July 2018 1	Vitosha Bistritsa	2 – 1	Dunav	Bistritsa
	Petko Tsankov (yellow card) 21', (red card) 90+4'; Nasko Milev 62' (pen.); Stefan Hristov 64'; Andi Renja (yellow card) 88' (yellow-red card) 90+4'	Report	Ahmed Ahmedov 4'; Krasimir Stanoev (red card) 90+4'	Stadium: Bistritsa Stadium; Referee: Ivaylo Stoyanov - the Wedding

29 July 2018 2	Vitosha Bistritsa	0 – 2	CSKA Sofia	Sofia
	Todor Gochev (yellow card) 33'	Report	Tiago Rodrigues 10'; Rúben Pinto 17'; Nikolay Bodurov (yellow card) 31'	Stadium: Vasil Levski National Stadium; Referee: Stanislav Stavrov

6 August 2018 3	Slavia	0 – 2	Vitosha Bistritsa	Sofia
	Galin Ivanov (yellow card) 48'; Sasho Aleksandrov (yellow card) 64'; Tsvetelin Chunchukov (yellow card) 70'; Emil Martinov (yellow card) 74'; Dimitar Velkovski (yellow card) 90+1'	Report	Daniel Kutev 13', 43', (yellow card) 48'; Petko Tsankov (yellow card) 63'; Radko Mutafchiyski (yellow card) 72'; Nasko Milev (yellow card) 77'; Georgi Kupenov (yellow card) 90+2'	Stadium: Vasil Levski National Stadium; Referee: Georgi Dimitrov

12 August 2018 4	Vitosha Bistritsa	0 – 2	Ludogorets	Bistritsa
	Todor Gochev (yellow card) 18'; Lachezar Kotev (yellow card) 23'	Report	Jacek Góralski (yellow card) 12'; Virgil Misidjan 65'; Claudiu Keșerü 75'; Cosmin Moți (yellow card) 85'; Jody Lukoki (yellow card) 90'	Stadium: Bistritsa Stadium; Referee: Georgi Kabakov

20 August 2018 5	Vereya	0 – 1	Vitosha Bistritsa	Stara Zagora
	Bilel Aït Malek (yellow card) 11'; Theofilos Kouroupis (yellow card) 13'	Report	Todor Gochev (yellow card) 49'; Stefan Hristov 88', (yellow card) 89'	Stadium: Trace Arena; Referee: Stanislav Todorov

25 August 2018 6	Vitosha Bistritsa	0 – 2	Botev Plovdiv	Bistritsa
	Lachezar Kotev (yellow card) 33'; Stefan Hristov (yellow card) 71'	Report	Todor Nedelev 33'; Lachezar Baltanov (yellow card) 71'; Steven Petkov (yellow card) 76'; Gustavo Sauer 90+3'	Stadium: Bistritsa Stadium; Referee: Georgi Davidov

31 August 2018 7	Cherno More	1 – 0	Vitosha Bistritsa	Varna
	Nasko Milev 3' (o.g.); Petar Vitanov (yellow card) 61'	Report	Nasko Milev (yellow card) 4'; Todor Gochev (yellow card) 26'; Ivaylo Todorov (yellow card) 33'; Petko Tsankov (yellow card) 45'	Stadium: Stadion Ticha; Referee: Petar Kostadinov

14 September 2018 8	Vitosha Bistritsa	1 – 1	Botev Vratsa	Bistritsa
	Ivaylo Mihaylov (yellow card) 18'; Valeri Bojinov 27'; Mariyan Ivanov (yellow card) 32'	Report	Ivaylo Lazarov 37'; Grigor Dolapchiev (yellow card) 40'; Ivan Valchanov (yellow card) 90+2'	Stadium: Bistritsa Stadium; Referee: Stanislav Stavrov

21 September 2018 9	Levski	4 – 1	Vitosha Bistritsa	Sofia
	David Jablonský 3'; Jerson Cabral 52'; Paulinho (penalty missed) 63'; Stanislav Kostov 65', 74'	Report	Radko Mutafchiyski (yellow card) 62'; Grigor Dolapchiev 83'	Stadium: Vivacom Arena - Georgi Asparuhov Stadium; Referee: Nedelcho Gadzhalov

28 September 2018 10	Vitosha Bistritsa	2 – 1	Septemvri	Bistritsa
	Todor Gochev (yellow card) 23'; Ivaylo Lazarov (yellow card) 42', (goal) 89'; Grigor Dolapchiev (penalty missed) 45'; Ivan Valchanov 75'	Report	Boris Galchev 13'; Alassane Diaby (yellow card) 37' (yellow-red card) 44'; Yaya Meledje (yellow card) 42'; Ivan Stoyanov (yellow card) 81'	Stadium: Bistritsa Stadium; Referee: Stanislav Stavrov

7 October 2018 11	Etar	1 – 0	Vitosha Bistritsa	Veliko Tarnovo
	Plamen Galabov (yellow card) 54'; Daniel Mladenov 77'	Report	Chetin Sadula (yellow card) 36'	Stadium: Stadion Ivaylo; Referee: Radoslav Gidzhenov

22 October 2018 12	Vitosha Bistritsa	1 – 2	Beroe	Bistritsa
	Chetin Sadula 18'; Kristiyan Uzunov (yellow card) 22'	Report	Martin Kamburov 37', 89'; Aleksandar Vasilev (yellow card) 64'; Vladimir Gadzhev (yellow card) 72'; Rúben Brígido (yellow card) 90+1'	Stadium: Bistritsa Stadium; Referee: Nikolay Yordanov

27 October 2018 13	Lokomotiv Plovdiv	2 – 1	Vitosha Bistritsa	Plovdiv
	Dimitar Iliev 19' (pen.); Alen Ožbolt 41'; Vilim Posinković (yellow card) 79'	Report	Lachezar Kotev (yellow card) 12'; Grigor Dolapchiev 73', (yellow card) 77'	Stadium: Lokomotiv Stadium; Referee: Dragomir Draganov

3 November 2018 14	Dunav	3 – 0	Vitosha Bistritsa	Ruse
	Ahmed Ahmedov 6', 23'; Svetoslav Kovachev 15', (yellow card) 17'; Hristo Popadiyn (yellow card) 69'; Preslav Petrov (yellow card) 71'	Report	Todor Gochev (yellow card) 17'; Ivaylo Lazarov (yellow card) 45'; Stefan Hristov (yellow card) 50'	Stadium: Gradski stadium Referee: Volen Chinkov

9 November 2018 15	CSKA Sofia	3 – 0	Vitosha Bistritsa	Sofia
	Kristiyan Malinov (yellow card) 71'; Maurides 79', 90+3'; Kiril Despodov 90'	Report	Ivaylo Lazarov (yellow card) 24'; Todor Gochev (yellow card) 39'; Hristiyan Vasilev (yellow card) 62'; Georgi Kupenov (yellow card) 82'	Stadium: Stadion Balgarska Armia; Referee: Nikola Popov

23 November 2018 16	Vitosha Bistritsa	1 – 0	Slavia	Bistritsa
	Daniel Kutev (yellow card) 72'; Nasko Milev 74', (yellow card) 75'; Nikolay Georgiev (yellow card) 87'	Report	Slavcho Shokolarov (yellow card) 44'; Georgi Yomov (yellow card) 79'; Iliyan Mitsanski (yellow card) 86'	Stadium: Bistritsa Stadium; Referee: Nedelcho Gadzhalov

2 December 2018 17	Ludogorets	3 – 0	Vitosha Bistritsa	Razgrad
	Wanderson 13'; Lucas Sasha 15'; Anton Nedyalkov (yellow card) 53'; Jakub Świerczok 81'	Report	Mihail Milchev (yellow card) 28'; Petko Tsankov (yellow card) 71'	Stadium: Ludogorets Arena; Referee: Vladimir Valkov

6 December 2018 18	Vitosha Bistritsa	2 – 0	Vereya	Bistritsa
	Chetin Sadula 22', 83'	Report	Alexander N'Doumbou (yellow card) 31'; Ivo Ivanov (yellow card) 70'; Emil Peter Jørgensen (yellow card) 83'	Stadium: Bistritsa Stadium; Referee: Stanimir Trenchev

10 December 2018 19	Botev Plovdiv	3 – 0	Vitosha Bistritsa	Plovdiv
	Todor Nedelev 24', 25', 42'; Dimitar Pirgov (red card) 41'	Report	Kristiyan Uzunov (yellow card) 12'; Todor Gochev (yellow card) 44'; Kristiyan Kochilov (yellow card) 69'	Stadium: Futbolen kompleks Botev 1912; Referee: Georgi Todorov

15 December 2018 20	Vitosha Bistritsa	1 – 1	Cherno More	Bistritsa
	Todor Gochev (yellow card) 33'; Mihail Milchev (yellow card) 60'; Ivaylo Lazarov 72'	Report	Georgi Iliev 72'	Stadium: Bistritsa Stadium; Referee: Nikolay Yordanov

16 February 2019 21	Botev Vratsa	1 – 0	Vitosha Bistritsa	Vratsa
	Yordan Apostolov (yellow card) 44'; Ivaylo Mihaylov (yellow card) 49' (yellow-red card) 88'; Valeri Domovchiyski (yellow card) 58', (goal) 62'	Report	Yulian Popev (yellow card) 25'	Stadium: Hristo Botev Stadium; Referee: Ivaylo Stoyanov - the Wedding

20 February 2019 22	Vitosha Bistritsa	0 – 2	Levski	Sofia
	Mihail Milchev (yellow card) 66'	Report	Paulinho 22'; Stanislav Kostov 42'; Miloš Cvetković (yellow card) 81'	Stadium: Vasil Levski National Stadium; Referee: Petar Kostadinov

25 February 2019 23	Septemvri	0 – 0	Vitosha Bistritsa	Sofia
	Georgi Stoichkov (yellow card) 42'; Fabiano Alves (yellow card) 75'	Report	Todor Gochev (yellow card) 36'; Ivaylo Lazarov (yellow card) 37'; Lachezar Kotev (yellow card) 69'	Stadium: Vasil Levski National Stadium; Referee: Volen Chinkov

3 March 2019 24	Vitosha Bistritsa	1 – 1	Etar	Bistritsa
	Kristiyan Kochilov 25' (pen.); Petko Tsankov (yellow card) 33'; Stefan Hristov (yellow card) 49'; Rumen Gyonov (yellow card) 54'; Hristiyan Vasilev (yellow card) 60'	Report	Flo Bojaj 66'; Milcho Angelov (yellow card) 72'; Ivan Stoyanov (yellow card) 75'; Ventsislav Vasilev (yellow card) 82'	Stadium: Bistritsa Stadium; Referee: Nikolay Yordanov

11 March 2019 25	Beroe	0 – 1	Vitosha Bistritsa	Stara Zagora
	Mesca (yellow card) 73'	Report	Chetin Sadula 55'	Stadium: Stadion Beroe; Referee: Nedelcho Gadzhalov

17 March 2019 26	Vitosha Bistritsa	0 – 3	Lokomotiv Plovdiv	Bistritsa
	Mihail Milchev (red card) 32'; Todor Gochev (yellow card) 39'; Georgi Kupenov (yellow card) 79'	Report	Abdelhakim Bouhna (yellow card) 39'; Edin Bahtić 66'; Dimitar Iliev 83'; Alen Ožbolt 90'	Stadium: Bistritsa Stadium; Referee: Georgi Kabakov

=== Relegation stage ===
1 April 2019 27	Botev Vratsa	3 – 0	Vitosha Bistritsa	Vratsa
	Simeon Mechev (yellow card) 32'; Valeri Domovchiyski 43'; Rumen Gyonov 50' (o.g.); Emil Stoev (yellow card) 54'; Petar Atanasov 67'	Report	Todor Gochev (yellow card) 9' (yellow-red card) 72'; Rumen Gyonov (yellow card) 23'; Georgi Kupenov (yellow card) 49'	Stadium: Hristo Botev Stadium; Referee: Petar Kostadinov

6 April 2019 28	Vereya	0 – 2	Vitosha Bistritsa	Stara Zagora
	Ivo Ivanov (yellow card) 14'; Denislav Stanchev (yellow card) 42'; Bedri Ryustemov (yellow card) 66'	Report	Grigor Dolapchiev 12'; Lachezar Kotev (yellow card) 17'; Emil Gargorov 80'	Stadium: Trace Arena; Referee: Radoslav Gidzhenov

15 April 2019 29	Vitosha Bistritsa	3 – 0	Etar	Bistritsa
	Emil Gargorov 25'; Grigor Dolapchiev (yellow card) 45+1'; Ivan Valchanov 58'; Stefan Hristov (yellow card) 88', (goal) 90+3'; Yulian Popev (yellow card) 90+1'	Report	Flo Bojaj (yellow card) 69'; Nikola Kolev (yellow card) 81'	Stadium: Bistritsa Stadium; Referee: Nedelcho Gadzalov

22 April 2019 30	Vitosha Bistritsa	2 – 5	Botev Vratsa	Bistritsa
	Todor Gochev (yellow card) 9'; Georgi Kupenov 30', (yellow card) 90+4'; Grigor Dolapchiev 48'; Mihail Milchev (yellow card) 54'; Ivaylo Lazarov (yellow card) 75'; Rumen Gyonov (yellow card) 84'; Petko Tsankov (yellow card) 86'	Report	Andreas Vasev (yellow card) 25'; Emil Stoev 15', 25', 41'; Valeri Domovchiyski 28'; Yordan Apostolov (yellow card) 52'; Ivaylo Mihaylov (yellow card) 89'; Daniel Genov 90+4'	Stadium: Bistritsa Stadium; Referee: Ivaylo Stoyanov - the Wedding

25 April 2019 31	Vitosha Bistritsa	2 – 0	Vereya	Bistritsa
	Stefan Hristov 12' (pen.); Grigor Dolapchiev 87'	Report		Stadium: Bistritsa Stadium; Referee: Vladimir Valkov

2 May 2019 32	Etar	2 – 0	Vitosha Bistritsa	Veliko Tarnovo
	Veljko Batrović 19'; Milcho Angelov 29'; Plamen Galabov (yellow card) 32'	Report	Ventsislav Bonev (yellow card) 43'	Stadium: Stadion Ivaylo; Referee: Nikolay Yordanov

=== Relegation play-offs ===
8 May 2019 First round 1st leg	Dunav	0 – 0	Vitosha Bistritsa	Ruse
	Krasimir Stanoev (yellow card) 64'	Report	Petko Tsankov (yellow card) 74' (yellow-red card) 80'; Ivan Valchanov (yellow card) 78'; Hristiyan Vasilev (yellow card) 90+2'	Stadium: City Stadium; Referee: Dragomir Draganov

13 May 2019 First round 2nd leg	Vitosha Bistritsa	0 – 1 (0 – 1 agg.)	Dunav	Bistritsa
	Lachezar Kotev (yellow card) 74'; Ventsislav Bonev (yellow card) 90+2'	Report	Ismail Isa 16'; Hristo Popadiyn (yellow card) 20'; Svetoslav Kovachev (yellow card) 77', (red card) 90+2'	Stadium: Bistritsa Stadium; Referee: Nedelcho Gadzhalov

19 May 2019 Second round 1st leg	Vereya	0 – 3 (awarded)	Vitosha Bistritsa	Stara Zagora
		Report		Stadium: Trace Arena

22 May 2019 Second round 2nd leg	Vitosha Bistritsa	3 – 0 (awarded) (6 – 0 agg.)	Vereya	Bistritsa
		Report		Stadium: Bistritsa Stadium

30 May 2019 Third round	Vitosha Bistritsa	3 – 0	Montana	Sofia
	Grigor Dolapchiev 52'; Lachezar Kotev (yellow card) 82'; Stefan Hristov (yellow card) 87'; Petko Ysankov (yellow card) 90'; Emil Gargorov 90', 90+3'	Report	Nikolay Tsvetkov (yellow card) 33'; Vladimir Aytov (yellow card) 39'; Galin Tashev (yellow card) 75'; Daniel Georgiev (yellow card) 83'; Yordan Yordanov (yellow card) 87'	Stadium: Stadion Slavia; Referee: Nikolay Yordanov

=== Bulgarian Cup ===
25 September 2018 First round	Botev Galabovo	0 – 0 (a.e.t.) (8 – 9 p)	Vitosha Bistritsa	Galabovo
	Svilen Shterev (yellow card) 63'; Isus Angelov (yellow card) 111'	Report	Kristiyan Kochilov (red card) 49'; Radko Mutafchiyski (yellow card) 78'; Lachezar Kotev (yellow card) 88' (yellow-red card) 109'	Stadium: Stadion Hristo Botev; Referee: Blagoy Manov
	Penalties
	(penalty scored) Svilen Shterev (penalty scored) (penalty scored) (penalty scored) (penalty scored) (penalty scored) (penalty scored) (penalty scored); (penalty missed) Pavel Kolev		(penalty scored) Daniel Kutev; (penalty scored) Ivan Valchanov; (penalty scored) Georgi Kupenov; (penalty scored) Ivaylo Lazarov; (penalty scored) Petko Tsankov; (penalty scored) Radko Mutafchiyski; (penalty scored) Georgi Amzin; (penalty scored) Rumen Gyonov; (penalty scored) Nikolay Georgiev

30 October 2018 Second round	CSKA Sofia	3 – 1	Vitosha Bistritsa	Sofia
	Rúben Pinto 15'; Ali Sowe 74', 76'	Report	Petko Tsankov (yellow card) 71'; Kristiyan Kochilov (yellow card) 77'; Mihail Milchev 90+1'	Stadium: Stadion Balgarska Armia; Referee: Petar Kirilov

== Squad statistics ==
As of match played 30 May 2019

No.	Pos	Nat	Player	Total		Parva Liga		Bulgarian Cup	
No.	Pos	Nat	Player	Apps	Goals	Apps	Goals	Apps	Goals
1	GK	(Bulgaria) BUL	Hristiyan Vasilev	24	0	23	0	1	0
2	DF	(Bulgaria) BUL	Todor Gochev	25	0	24	0	1	0
4	DF	(Bulgaria) BUL	Kristiyan Uzunov	13	0	6+6	0	0+1	0
5	DF	(Bulgaria) BUL	Ventsislav Bonev	12	0	9+3	0	0	0
6	DF	(Bulgaria) BUL	Rumen Gyonov	26	0	19+5	0	1+1	0
7	MF	(Bulgaria) BUL	Kristiyan Kochilov	22	1	8+12	1	2	0
9	MF	(Bulgaria) BUL	Angel Stoyanov	2	0	0+1	0	1	0
10	MF	(Bulgaria) BUL	Georgi Amzin	30	0	16+12	0	1+1	0
11	FW	(Bulgaria) BUL	Daniel Kutev	19	2	12+5	2	1+1	0
14	MF	(Bulgaria) BUL	Chetin Sadula	31	4	24+6	4	1	0
12	GK	(Bulgaria) BUL	Nikolay Georgiev	12	0	11	0	1	0
16	DF	(Bulgaria) BUL	Radko Mutafchiyski	11	0	10	0	1	0
17	MF	(Bulgaria) BUL	Mihail Petrov	4	0	1+3	0	0	0
18	MF	(Bulgaria) BUL	Petko Tsankov	26	0	21+3	0	2	0
22	DF	(Bulgaria) BUL	Mihail Milchev	25	1	22+2	0	1	1
23	MF	(Bulgaria) BUL	Emil Gargorov	11	4	7+4	4	0	0
24	DF	(Bulgaria) BUL	Georgi Kupenov	30	1	27+1	1	2	0
45	FW	(Bulgaria) BUL	Grigor Dolapchiev	23	6	12+10	6	1	0
77	MF	(Bulgaria) BUL	Ivan Valchanov	18	2	12+4	2	1+1	0
80	MF	(Bulgaria) BUL	Lachezar Kotev	34	0	32+1	0	0+1	0
88	MF	(Bulgaria) BUL	Ivaylo Lazarov	31	3	29	3	2	0
94	DF	(Bulgaria) BUL	Yulian Popev	11	0	9+2	0	0	0
96	FW	(Bulgaria) BUL	Nasko Milev	25	2	19+5	2	1	0
99	FW	(Bulgaria) BUL	Stefan Hristov	31	4	25+5	4	1	0
Players who left Vitosha Bistritsa during the season:
3	DF	(Bulgaria) BUL	Yordan Varbanov	0	0	0	0	0	0
17	FW	(Albania) ALB	Andi Renja	5	0	3+2	0	0	0
24	DF	(Bulgaria) BUL	Nikolay Hristozov	0	0	0	0	0	0
25	DF	(Bulgaria) BUL	Georgi Angelov	0	0	0	0	0	0
30	DF	(Bulgaria) BUL	Iliyan Popov	0	0	0	0	0	0
66	MF	(Bulgaria) BUL	Orlin Starokin	0	0	0	0	0	0
77	MF	(Bulgaria) BUL	Daniel Peev	0	0	0	0	0	0
94	DF	(Bulgaria) BUL	Ivaylo Todorov	1	0	1	0	0	0
