= 2019–20 FC Vitosha Bistritsa season =

Vitosha Bistritsa
2019–20 season
- Chairman: Sergei Tashkov
- Manager: Engibar Engibarov (until 26 December 2019); Asen Bukarev (since 27 December 2019)
- Stadium: Bistritsa Stadium
- Top goalscorer: League: Emil Gargorov (3); All: Emil Gargorov (3)
- Biggest win: 4–0 v. Chernomorets Balchik (26 September 2019)
- Biggest defeat: 2–6 v. Etar (2 March 2020)
Home colours	Away colours	Third colours

The 2019–20 season is Vitosha Bistritsa's third consecutive season in the Bulgarian First League after they won 3-0 the play-off promotion/relegation match against Montana on May 3, 2019, on Slavia Stadium in Sofia with goals of Grigor Dolapchiev and Emil Gargorov (2).

== Squad ==
No.	Name	Nationality	Position(s)	Age	EU	Since	Signed From
Goalkeepers
1	Hristiyan Vasilev	Bulgaria	GK	29	EU	2016	Slavia Sofiа
12	Nikolay Georgiev	Bulgaria	GK	28	EU	2018	Septemvri Sofia
33	Kristiyan Katsarev	Bulgaria	GK	31	EU	2019	Vereya
Defenders
2	Todor Gochev	Bulgaria	LB/LWB	33	EU	2017	Botev Vratsa
3	Evgeni Zyumbulev	Bulgaria	CB	37	EU	2019	Lokomotiv Sofia
4	Kristiyan Uzunov	Bulgaria	CB/DM	37	EU	2015	Oborishte Panagyurishte
5	Ventsislav Bonev	Bulgaria	CB/LB	46	EU	2015	Minyor Pernik
6	Rumen Gyonov	Bulgaria	RB/RWB	34	EU	2014	Germanea Sapareva Banya
18	Theofilos Kouroupis	Greece	LB	36	EU	2019	Vereya
22	Aleksandar Hristev	Bulgaria	CB	36	EU	2019	Atletik Kuklen
24	Georgi Kupenov	Bulgaria	CB	29	EU	2018	Botev Plovdiv
Midfielders
7	Kristiyan Kochilov	Bulgaria	CM/DM	36	EU	2015	Slivnishki Geroy
10	Georgi Amzin (vice-captain)	Bulgaria	CM/AM	34	EU	2014	Slivnishki Geroy
14	Chetin Sadula (captain)	Bulgaria	LW/AM	39	EU	2013	Lokomotiv Plovdiv
23	Emil Gargorov	Bulgaria	AM	45	EU	2019	CSKA 1948
80	Lachezar Kotev	Bulgaria	AM/RW	28	EU	2016	Septemvri Sofia
88	Martin Stankev	Bulgaria	AM	37	EU	2019	Dunav
93	Atanas Kabov	Bulgaria	AM/RW/LW	27	EU	2019	Levski Sofia
Forwards
9	Iliya Dimitrov	Bulgaria	CF	30	EU	2019	Levski Sofia
11	Daniel Kutev	Bulgaria	LW	35	EU	2017	Nestos Chrysoupoli
17	Zapro Dinev	Bulgaria	LW	27	EU	2019	Botev Plovdiv
45	Grigor Dolapchiev	Bulgaria	CF	32	EU	2017	Spartak Pleven

== Fixtures ==
Win Draw Loss Upcoming fixture

=== Regular season ===
14 July 2019 1	Slavia	3 – 2	Vitosha Bistritsa	Sofia
	Yanis Karabelyov 15'; Dimitar Velkovski (yellow card) 45'; Darko Tasevski 60'; Vladislav Uzunov (yellow card) 69'; Kaloyan Krastev 88', (yellow card) 89'	Report	Georgi Amzin 11'; Emil Gargorov 23'; Kristiyan Uzunov (yellow card) 32'; Rumen Gyonov (yellow card) 55'	Stadium: Slavia Stadium; Referee: Georgi Davidov; Man of the Match: Darko Tasevski

22 July 2019 2	Vitosha Bistritsa	0 – 2	Botev Vratsa	Bistritsa
	Grigor Dolapchiev (yellow card) 35'; Georgi Amzin (yellow card) 42'; Rumen Gyonov (yellow card) 44'	Report	Daniel Genov 17', (yellow card) 90'; Iliya Milanov 54'	Stadium: Bistritsa Stadium; Referee: Nikola Popov; Man of the Match: Daniel Genov

29 July 2019 3	Ludogorets	2 – 0	Vitosha Bistritsa	Razgrad
	Jakub Świerczok 79'; Serkan Yusein (yellow card) 87'; Jody Lukoki 90'	Report	Theofilos Kouroupis (yellow card) 18'; Aleksandar Hristev (yellow card) 61'; Rumen Gyonov (yellow card) 74'	Stadium: Ludogorets Arena; Referee: Radoslav Gidzenov; Man of the Match: Nikolay Georgiev

2 August 2019 4	Vitosha Bistritsa	1 – 3	Arda	Bistritsa
	Georgi Kupenov 23', (yellow card) 67'; Martin Stankev (yellow card) 28'; Aleksandar Hristev (red card) 88'	Report	Radoslav Vasilev 5'; Deyan Lozev (yellow card) 22'; Veselin Marchev (yellow card) 44'; Ivan Kokonov 59' (pen.); Rumen Gyonov 69' (o.g.); Elisha Sam (yellow card) 84'	Stadium: Bistritsa Stadium; Referee: Dragomir Draganov; Man of the Match: Ivan Kokonov

9 August 2019 5	Dunav	2 – 0	Vitosha Bistritsa	Ruse
	Fernando Henrique (yellow card) 31'; Ahmed Ahmedov 39', 60', (yellow card) 59'; Martin Kovachev (yellow card) 47'	Report	Todor Gochev (yellow card) 29'	Stadium: Gradski Stadium; Referee: Georgi Kabakov; Man of the Match: Ahmed Ahmedov

17 August 2019 6	Vitosha Bistritsa	0 – 4	Levski	Sofia
	Emil Gargorov (yellow card) 26'; Todor Gochev (yellow card) 55'	Report	Paulinho 22', 50'; Stanislav Ivanov (yellow card) 53'; Filipe Nascimento 82'; Nigel Robertha 89'	Stadium: Vasil Levski National Stadium; Referee: Radoslav Gidzenov; Man of the Match: Paulinho

24 August 2019 7	Botev Plovdiv	2 – 1	Vitosha Bistritsa	Plovdiv
	Marko Pervan 22', 60'; Lachezar Baltanov (yellow card) 90'; Georgi Argilashki (yellow card) 90+2'	Report	Georgi Amzin (yellow card) 25'; Iliya Dimitrov 33', (yellow card) 73'	Stadium: Futbolen Kompleks Botev 1912; Referee: Valentin Zhelezov; Man of the Match: Marko Pervan

1 September 2019 8	Vitosha Bistritsa	3 – 2	Tsarsko Selo	Bistritsa
	Iliya Dimitrov 14'; Chetin Sadula (yellow card) 39', (goal) 84'; Emil Gargorov 51' (pen.); Evgeni Zyumbulev (yellow card) 67'; Todor Gochev (yellow card) 74'	Report	Wesley Natã (yellow card) 31' (yellow-red card) 72', (goal) 64'; Rumen Gyonov 37' (o.g.)	Stadium: Bistritsa Stadium; Referee: Nikolay Yordanov; Man of the Match: Emil Gargorov

16 September 2019 9	Beroe	1 – 0	Vitosha Bistritsa	Stara Zagora
	Yuliyan Nenov (yellow card) 45'; Zoran Josipovic 84'	Report	Todor Gochev (yellow card) 5'; Lachezar Kotev (yellow card) 20'; Evgeni Zyumbulev (yellow card) 37'	Stadium: Beroe Stadium; Referee: Ivaylo Stoyanov; Man of the Match: Zoran Josipovic

23 August 2019 10	Etar	1 – 0	Vitosha Bistritsa	Veliko Tarnovo
	Krasimir Stanoev (yellow card) 23'; Ivan Ivanov (yellow card) 25'; Yani Pehlivanov 42', (yellow card) 87'; Krum Stoyanov (yellow card) 90+1'	Report	Emil Gargorov (yellow card) 23' (yellow-red card) 86', (penalty missed) 26'; Ventsislav Bonev (yellow card) 27'; Iliya Dimitrov (yellow card) 84'; Todor Gochev (yellow card) 86'	Stadium: Ivaylo Stadium; Referee: Vladimir Valkov; Man of the Match: Hristo Ivanov

30 September 2019 11	Vitosha Bistritsa	2 – 3	Lokomotiv Plovdiv	Bistritsa
	Ventsislav Bonev (yellow card) 41', (goal) 90+3'; Atanas Kabov 53'; Evgeni Zyumbulev (yellow card) 55'	Report	Dinis Almeida 33'; Georgi Iliev 52'; Dimitar Iliev 66' (pen.); Martin Lukov (yellow card) 88'	Stadium: Bistritsa Stadium; Referee: Georgi Davidov; Man of the Match: Georgi Iliev

5 October 2019 12	CSKA Sofia	4 – 0	Vitosha Bistritsa	Sofia
	Tony Watt 4'; Raúl Albentosa 19'; Kristiyan Malinov 39'; Evandro 73'	Report	Todor Gochev (yellow card) 22'	Stadium: Balgarska Armia Stadium; Referee: Georgi Ivanov; Man of the Match: Kristiyan Malinov

18 October 2019 13	Vitosha Bistritsa	0 – 2	Cherno More	Bistritsa
	Todor Gochev (yellow card) 25'; Kristiyan Kochilov (yellow card) 26'; Rumen Gyonov (yellow card) 48'	Report	Tsvetomir Panov (yellow card) 22'; Fahd Aktaou (yellow card) 42'; Rodrigo Henrique (yellow card) 43' (goal) 54'; Dani Kiki 65'; Ismail Isa (yellow card) 90+2'	Stadium: Bistritsa Stadium; Referee: Nikola Popov; Man of the Match: Dani Kiki

31 October 2019 14	Vitosha Bistritsa	0 – 1	Slavia	Bistritsa
	Martin Stankev (yellow card) 16'; Grigor Dolapchiev (yellow card) 30'; Georgi Kupenov (yellow card) 69'; Kristiyan Kochilov (yellow card) 75'	Report	Slavcho Shokolarov (yellow card) 30'; Georgi Yomov 52'; Georgi Georgiev (yellow card) 80'	Stadium: Bistritsa Stadium; Referee: Stanislav Todorov; Man of the Match: Georgi Yomov

5 November 2019 15	Botev Vratsa	1 – 1	Vitosha Bistritsa	Vratsa
	Daniel Gadzhev (yellow card) 35'; Angel Lyaskov (yellow card) 38'; Valeri Bozhinov (yellow card) 40'; Valeri Domovchiyski 45+3' (pen.)	Report	Grigor Dolapchiev (yellow card) 29'; Kristiyan Kochilov (yellow card) 36'; Chetin Sadula (yellow card) 44'; Hristiyan Vasilev (yellow card) 45+2'; Zapro Dinev (yellow card) 72', (goal) 74'	Stadium: Hristo Botev Stadium; Referee: Stanimir Trenchev; Man of the Match: Hristiyan Vasilev

10 November 2019 16	Vitosha Bistritsa	0 – 1	Ludogorets	Bistritsa
	Georgi Kupenov (yellow card) 46'; Lachezar Kotev (yellow card) 56'; Hristiyan Vasilev (yellow card) 86'	Report	Jordan Ikoko (yellow card) 38'; Dimo Bakalov 90+1'	Stadium: Bistritsa Stadium; Referee: Georgi Dimitrov; Man of the Match: Kristiyan Kochilov

22 November 2019 17	Arda	2 – 0	Vitosha Bistritsa	Plovdiv
	Radoslav Vasilev 22', 48', (yellow card) 38'; Ilias Hassani (yellow card) 33'; Atanas Krastev (yellow card) 64'; Connor Randall (yellow card) 90+2'	Report	Georgi Amzin (yellow card) 17'; Todor Gochev (yellow card) 57'	Stadium: Lokomotiv Stadium; Referee: Nikolay Yordanov; Man of the Match: Radoslav Vasilev

1 December 2019 18	Vitosha Bistritsa	1 – 1	Dunav	Bistritsa
	Rumen Gyonov (yellow card) 43' (yellow-red card) 77'; Emil Gargorov 53' (pen.)	Report	Ivaylo Lazarov (yellow card) 22'; Diyan Dimov (yellow card) 26'; Svilen Shterev (yellow card) 27'; Stefan Hristov 65'	Stadium: Bistritsa Stadium; Referee: Vladimir Valkov; Man of the Match: Stefan Hristov

8 December 2019 19	Levski	2 – 0	Vitosha Bistritsa	Sofia
	Paulinho 24'; Stanislav Ivanov 60'	Report	Aleksandar Hristev (yellow card) 75'; Georgi Kupenov (yellow card) 82'; Rumen Gyonov (yellow card) 87'	Stadium: Vivacom Arena - Georgi Asparuhov Stadium; Referee: Nikola Popov; Man of the Match: Stanislav Ivanov

15 December 2019 20	Vitosha Bistritsa	0 – 2	Botev Plovdiv	Bistritsa
	Ventsislav Bonev (yellow card) 19'; Evgeni Zyumbulev (yellow card) 71'	Report	Todor Nedelev 46'; Fernando Viana 81'	Stadium: Bistritsa Stadium; Referee: Georgi Ivanov; Man of the Match: Todor Nedelev

14 February 2020 21	Tsarsko Selo	1 – 0	Vitosha Bistritsa	Sofia
	Rumen Gyonov (yellow card) 19'; Antonio Georgiev 70'; Ivaylo Markov (yellow card) 88'; Ivaylo Ivanov (yellow card) 90'	Report	Daniel Kutev (yellow card) 23'; Yordan Minev (yellow card) 86'; Georgi Sarmov (yellow card) 90+1'	Stadium: Tsarsko Selo Sports Complex; Referee: Dragomir Draganov; Man of the Match: Antonio Georgiev

23 February 2020 22	Vitosha Bistritsa	1 – 2	Beroe	Bistritsa
	Georgi Amzin 3'; Veselin Minev (yellow card) 35'	Report	Alioune Fall 24'; Gaius Makouta (yellow card) 54' (goal) 88'; Teddy Mézague (yellow card) 75'	Stadium: Bistritsa Stadium; Referee: Petar Kostadinov; Man of the Match: Gaius Makouta

2 March 2020 23	Vitosha Bistritsa	2 – 6	Etar	Bistritsa
	Kristiyan Kochilov 31' (pen.); Chetin Sadula (yellow card) 58'; Iliya Dimitrov 59'; Evgeni Zyumbulev (yellow card) 63'; Lachezar Kotev (yellow card) 72'	Report	Aleksandar Dyulgerov 11'; Veselin Minev 12' (o.g.); Yani Pehlivanov 15'; Flo Bojaj 41'; Ivan Stoyanov 65'; Bozhidar Katsarov (yellow card) 71'; Tonislav Yordanov 76'	Stadium: Bistritsa Stadium; Referee: Georgi Ivanov; Man of the Match: Milcho Angelov

7 March 2020 24	Lokomotiv Plovdiv	1 – 1	Vitosha Bistritsa	Plovdiv
	Ante Aralica 33'; Josip Tomašević (yellow card) 37'; Mirza Hasanbegović (yellow card) 84'	Report	Hristo Ivanov (yellow card) 27'; Bogomil Dyakov (yellow card) 80'; Apostol Popov 86'; Iliya Dimitrov (yellow card) 90+2'	Stadium: Lokomotiv Stadium; Referee: Georgi Dimitrov; Man of the Match: Apostol Popov

6 June 2020 25	Vitosha Bistritsa	0 – 1	CSKA Sofia	Bistritsa
	Nikolay Krastev (yellow card) 24'; Zapro Dinev (yellow card) 41'; Georgi Amzin (yellow card) 56'; Evgeni Zyumbulev (yellow card) 71'; Bogomil Dyakov (yellow card) 76'; Daniel Kutev (yellow card) 89'	Report	Ali Sowe (penalty missed) 25'; Rúben Pinto (yellow card) 63'; Ahmed Ahmedov (yellow card) 73'; Evandro 85'	Stadium: Bistritsa Stadium; Referee: Radoslav Gidzhenov; Man of the Match: Evandro

13 June 2020 26	Cherno More	2 – 0	Vitosha Bistritsa	Varna
	Chetin Sadula 45+1' (o.g.); Ismail Isa 48'; Viktor Popov (yellow card) 70'; Petar Vutsov (yellow card) 90+2'	Report	Atanas Kabov (yellow card) 71'	Stadium: Ticha Stadium; Referee: Stanimir Trenchev; Man of the Match: Ilian Iliev Jr.

=== Bulgarian Cup ===
26 September 2019 First round	Chernomorets Balchik	0 – 4	Vitosha Bistritsa	Balchik
	Miroslav Nachev (yellow card) 43'	Report	Daniel Kutev 1'; Hristo Ivanov 14'; Grigor Dolapchiev 30', 58', (yellow card) 90+1'; Kristiyan Kochilov (yellow card) 70'	Stadium: Balchik Stadium; Referee: Stanislav Stavrov

4 December 2019 Second round	Botev Galabovo	2 – 1	Vitosha Bistritsa	Stara Zagora
	Nikolay Yankov (yellow card) 31'; Tsvetelin Radev (yellow card) 70'; Eray Karadayi 79', 90+2' (yellow card) 90+3'	Report	Atanas Kabov 46'; Vanyo Ivanov (yellow card) 75'	Stadium: Trace Arena; Referee: Georgi Ginchev

== Squad statistics ==
As of match played 1 December 2019

No.	Pos	Nat	Player	Total		Parva Liga		Bulgarian Cup	
No.	Pos	Nat	Player	Apps	Goals	Apps	Goals	Apps	Goals
1	GK	(Bulgaria) BUL	Hristiyan Vasilev	11	0	11	0	0	0
2	DF	(Bulgaria) BUL	Todor Gochev	16	0	16	0	0	0
3	DF	(Bulgaria) BUL	Evgeni Zyumbulev	12	0	11+1	0	0	0
4	DF	(Bulgaria) BUL	Kristiyan Uzunov	6	0	2+3	0	0+1	0
5	DF	(Bulgaria) BUL	Ventsislav Bonev	18	1	18	1	0	0
6	DF	(Bulgaria) BUL	Rumen Gyonov	10	0	10	0	0	0
7	MF	(Bulgaria) BUL	Kristiyan Kochilov	11	0	8+2	0	1	0
9	FW	(Bulgaria) BUL	Iliya Dimitrov	6	2	6	2	0	0
10	MF	(Bulgaria) BUL	Georgi Amzin	16	1	15+1	1	0	0
11	FW	(Bulgaria) BUL	Daniel Kutev	6	1	2+3	0	1	1
12	GK	(Bulgaria) BUL	Nikolay Georgiev	2	0	2	0	0	0
14	MF	(Bulgaria) BUL	Chetin Sadula	14	1	12+2	1	0	0
17	FW	(Bulgaria) BUL	Zapro Dinev	13	1	2+10	1	0+1	0
18	DF	(Greece) GRE	Theofilos Kouroupis	10	0	4+5	0	1	0
22	DF	(Bulgaria) BUL	Aleksandar Hristev	4	0	2+1	0	1	0
23	MF	(Bulgaria) BUL	Emil Gargorov	10	3	8+2	3	0	0
24	DF	(Bulgaria) BUL	Georgi Kupenov	13	1	11+1	1	1	0
33	GK	(Bulgaria) BUL	Kristiyan Katsarev	7	0	5+1	0	1	0
45	FW	(Bulgaria) BUL	Grigor Dolapchiev	13	2	6+6	0	1	2
80	MF	(Bulgaria) BUL	Lachezar Kotev	19	0	18	0	1	0
88	MF	(Bulgaria) BUL	Martin Stankev	10	0	8+1	0	1	0
93	MF	(Bulgaria) BUL	Atanas Kabov	14	1	12+2	1	0	0
Players who left Vitosha Bistritsa during the season:
9	MF	(Bulgaria) BUL	Angel Stoyanov	0	0	0	0	0	0
16	DF	(Bulgaria) BUL	Radko Mutafchiyski	0	0	0	0	0	0
17	MF	(Bulgaria) BUL	Mihail Petrov	0	0	0	0	0	0
18	MF	(Bulgaria) BUL	Petko Tsankov	0	0	0	0	0	0
22	DF	(Bulgaria) BUL	Mihail Milchev	0	0	0	0	0	0
77	MF	(Bulgaria) BUL	Ivan Valchanov	0	0	0	0	0	0
88	MF	(Bulgaria) BUL	Ivaylo Lazarov	0	0	0	0	0	0
94	DF	(Bulgaria) BUL	Yulian Popev	0	0	0	0	0	0
96	FW	(Bulgaria) BUL	Nasko Milev	0	0	0	0	0	0
99	FW	(Bulgaria) BUL	Stefan Hristov	0	0	0	0	0	0
