= Yasin Mishaui =

Bulgarian footballer and manager

Personal information
- Full name: Yasin Sharaf Mishaui
- Date of birth: 21 July 1975 (age 51)
- Place of birth: Sofia, Bulgaria
- Height: 1.79 m (5 ft 10 in)
- Position: Midfielder

Team information
- Current team: Al-Markhiya (assistant coach)

Senior career*
Years	Team	Apps	(Gls)
1996–1998	Botev Plovdiv		
1998–2000	Belasitsa Petrich		
2001–2002	PAS Giannina		
2002–2003	Conegliano German		
2003–2004	Al-Merrikh		
2005–2007	Vitosha Bistritsa		

Managerial career
- 2004–2006: FC Academic Sofia U17
- 2006–2014: Vitosha Bistritsa
- 2010–2013: Bulgaria amateurs international team
- 2014–2015: Vitosha Bistritsa U19
- 2015–2017: Al-Markhiya Academy
- 2017–2020: Al-Markhiya (assistant)
- 2021: Al-Mesaimeer SC (assistant)
- 2021–current: Al-Markhiya (assistant)
- * Club domestic league appearances and goals

Yasin Mishaui (Bulgarian: Ясин Мишауи) (born 21 July 1975) is a Bulgarian former footballer of partial Arab descent.

== Career ==
Born in Sofia, the son of a Bulgarian mother and a Sudanese father, Mishaui has played for a number of professional teams in the country, including Balkan Botevgrad, Botev Plovdiv, Belasitsa, Iskar, Conegliano German, FC Bankya, and Vitosha Bistritsa. He also had a spell in Greece. Given that he had not made appearances for Bulgarian national sides, in 2004 he received an offer to represent the national team of Sudan, but eventually this did not materialize.

He was the manager of Vitosha Bistritsa for more than 7 years, leading them to their first ever promotion to the second tier of Bulgarian football and winning the Bulgaria Amateur Cup in 2013. He also at one point coached current Bulgarian Prime Minister Boyko Borisov. In March 2014, Nikolay Todorov replaced Mishaui at the helm of the "Bistritsa tigers".
