= Paul Otofe =

Nigerian footballer

Personal information
- Full name: Lucky Paul Otofe
- Date of birth: 23 September 1989 (age 37)
- Place of birth: Nigeria
- Height: 1.85 m (6 ft 1 in)
- Positions: Winger; forward

Senior career*
Years	Team	Apps	(Gls)
2012–2013	Abahani Dhaka	34	(17)
2014–2016	Shumen	49	(18)
2016–2017	Vitosha Bistritsa	36	(5)
- Strumska Slava
- Germanea
2019-?	Nadezhda Dobroslavtsi		
- * Club domestic league appearances and goals as of 11 December 2017

Lucky Paul Otofe (born 23 September 1989) is a Nigerian professional footballer who currently plays as a forward. After joining Bulgarian club Shumen in 2014, between the summer of 2016 and February 2018 he was under contract with Vitosha Bistritsa, scoring a goal against Neftochimic Burgas in a playoff match held in June 2017 that secured the team's first ever promotion to the top division of Bulgarian football. Subsequently to leaving Vitosha, Otofe played for Strumska Slava, Germanea and Nadezhda Dobroslavtsi, signing for the latter in July 2019.
