= Kitan Vasilev =

Bulgarian footballer

Personal information
- Full name: Kitan Svetoslavov Vasilev
- Date of birth: 19 February 1997 (age 29)
- Place of birth: Blagoevgrad, Bulgaria
- Height: 1.79 m (5 ft 10 in)
- Positions: Winger; forward

Team information
- Current team: Strumska Slava
- Number: 11

Youth career
- Slavia Sofia

Senior career*
| Years | Team | Apps | (Gls) |
| 2014–2019 | Slavia Sofia | 8 | (1) |
| 2016 | → Vitosha Bistritsa (loan) | 16 | (4) |
| 2017 | → Vitosha Bistritsa (loan) | 8 | (0) |
| 2018–2019 | → Tsarsko Selo (loan) | 30 | (3) |
| 2019 | Lokomotiv Sofia | 7 | (1) |
| 2020–2021 | Septemvri Simitli | 39 | (6) |
| 2022 | Hebar | 12 | (3) |
| 2022 | Pirin Blagoevgrad | 12 | (1) |
| 2023–2024 | Krumovgrad | 37 | (2) |
| 2024 | Dobrudzha | 9 | (0) |
| 2025 | Vihren Sandanski | 29 | (7) |
| 2026 | Marek Dupnitsa | 12 | (1) |
| 2026– | Strumska Slava | 11 | (6) |

International career
| 2014 | Bulgaria U17 | 3 | (0) |
| 2017 | Bulgaria U21 | 1 | (0) |
- * Club domestic league appearances and goals as of 1 November 2026

Kitan Vasilev (Bulgarian: Китан Василев; born 19 February 1997) is a Bulgarian professional footballer who plays as a winger for Strumska Slava Radomir.

== Career ==
=== Slavia Sofia ===
Vasilev started his career in Slavia Sofia. He made his professional debut on 17 May 2014 in a match against Pirin Gotse Delchev. For the 2016–17 season he was sent on loan to Vitosha Bistritsa for a season long deal and after a good first half of the season on 18 December 2016 his loan was ended and he returned to Slavia. On 3 August 2017, he was loaned again to Vitosha Bistritsa.

On 16 January 2018 he switched his loan from Vitosha to Tsarsko Selo.

=== Krumovgrad ===
In January 2023, Vasilev joined Krumovgrad.

== Career statistics ==
=== Club ===
As of 20 January 2018

| Club performance | | | League | | Cup | | Continental | | Other | | Total | |
| Club | League | Season | Apps | Goals | Apps | Goals | Apps | Goals | Apps | Goals | Apps | Goals |
| Bulgaria | | | League | | Bulgarian Cup | | Europe | | Other (Note: Includes Bulgarian Supercup matches.) | | Total | |
|---|---|---|---|---|---|---|---|---|---|---|---|---|
| Slavia Sofia | A Group | 2013–14 | 1 | 0 | 0 | 0 | – | | – | | 1 | 0 |
| Slavia Sofia | A Group | 2014–15 | 2 | 1 | 0 | 0 | – | | – | | 2 | 1 |
| Slavia Sofia | A Group | 2015–16 | 2 | 0 | 1 | 0 | – | | – | | 3 | 0 |
| Vitosha Bistritsa (loan) | Second League | 2016–17 | 16 | 4 | 1 | 1 | – | | – | | 17 | 5 |
| Slavia Sofia | First League | 2016–17 | 3 | 0 | 0 | 0 | 0 | 0 | 1 (Note: Relegation Play-offs) | 0 | 4 | 0 |
| Vitosha Bistritsa (loan) | First League | 2017–18 | 8 | 0 | 1 | 0 | – | | 0 | 0 | 9 | 0 |
| Tsarsko Selo (loan) | Second League | 2017–18 | 0 | 0 | 0 | 0 | – | | 0 | 0 | 0 | 0 |
| Career total | | | 32 | 5 | 3 | 1 | 0 | 0 | 1 | 0 | 37 | 6 |
