= Evgeni Zyumbulev =

Bulgarian footballer

Personal information
- Full name: Evgeni Dimitrov Zyumbulev
- Date of birth: 1 September 1988 (age 38)
- Place of birth: Kyustendil, Bulgaria
- Height: 1.90 m (6 ft 3 in)
- Position: Centre-back

Team information
- Current team: Kyustendil
- Number: 3

Senior career*
Years	Team	Apps	(Gls)
2008–2010	Strumska Slava		
2011	Malesh Mikrevo	14	(1)
2012	Shumen	7	(0)
2013–2016	Strumska Slava	94	(6)
2016	Tsarsko Selo	16	(2)
2017–2018	Lokomotiv Sofia	27	(3)
2018	CSKA 1948	10	(0)
2019	Lokomotiv Sofia	11	(0)
2019–2020	Vitosha Bistritsa	24	(0)
2021–	Kyustendil	54	(3)
- * Club domestic league appearances and goals as of 8 October 2022

Evgeni Zyumbulev (Bulgarian: Евгени Зюмбулев; born 1 September 1988) is a Bulgarian footballer who plays as a defender for Kyustendil.
