= Dimitar Pantaleev =

Bulgarian footballer

Personal information
- Full name: Dimitar Robertov Pantaleev
- Date of birth: 19 December 1995 (age 30)
- Place of birth: Sevlievo, Bulgaria
- Position: Midfielder

Team information
- Current team: Botev Ihtiman
- Number: 11

Youth career
- –2015: Vidima-Rakovski

Senior career*
Years	Team	Apps	(Gls)
2015–2016	Minyor Pernik	10	(1)
2016–2018	Vitosha Bistritsa	13	(0)
2018	→ Oborishte (loan)	1	(0)
2018	Sportist Svoge	2	(0)
2019	Minyor Pernik	8	(0)
2019–2020	Svilengrad	19	(5)
2020–2022	Marek Dupnitsa	60	(11)
2022–2024	Slivnishki Geroy	62	(13)
2024	Oborishte	16	(2)
2025–	Botev Ihtiman	33	(4)
- * Club domestic league appearances and goals as of 26 January 2026

Dimitar Pantaleev (born 19 December 1995) is a Bulgarian footballer who plays as a midfielder for Botev Ihtiman.

== Career ==
Panteleev began his career in his local Vidima-Rakovski, but after team dissolve he moved to Minyor Pernik. In 2016 he moved to Vitosha Bistritsa. He made his debut in First League on 28 August 2017 in a match against Vereya.

On 8 January 2018 he was sent on loan to Oborishte for the rest of the season.
