= Rumen Sandev =

Bulgarian association football player

Personal information
- Full name: Rumen Sandov Sandev
- Date of birth: 19 November 1988 (age 37)
- Place of birth: Blagoevgrad, Bulgaria
- Height: 1.83 m (6 ft 0 in)
- Position: Centre back

Senior career*
| Years | Team | Apps | (Gls) |
| 2010–2012 | Malesh Mikrevo | 49 | (3) |
| 2012–2018 | Pirin Blagoevgrad | 153 | (3) |
| 2018–2019 | Arda Kardzhali | 23 | (2) |
| 2019–2020 | Septemvri Sofia | 15 | (1) |
| 2020–2022 | Strumska Slava | 62 | (1) |
| 2023 | Marek Dupnitsa | 27 | (0) |
| 2024 | Strumska Slava | 30 | (0) |
| 2025 | Vihren Sandanski | 16 | (0) |
| Total | | 375 | (10) |
- * Club domestic league appearances and goals

Rumen Sandov Sandev (Bulgarian: Румен Сандов Сандев; born 19 November 1988) is a former Bulgarian professional footballer who played as a defender.
