= Georgi Kupenov =

Bulgarian footballer

Personal information
- Full name: Georgi Slavchev Kupenov
- Date of birth: 24 February 1997 (age 29)
- Place of birth: Burgas, Bulgaria
- Height: 1.84 m (6 ft 0 in)
- Position: Centre back

Team information
- Current team: Minyor Pernik
- Number: 24

Youth career
- Chernomorets Burgas
- Botev Plovdiv

Senior career*
Years	Team	Apps	(Gls)
2015–2018	Botev Plovdiv	0	(0)
2016	→ Dobrudzha (loan)	7	(0)
2016–2017	→ Septemvri Sofia (loan)	19	(2)
2017–2018	→ Nesebar (loan)	18	(0)
2018–2020	Vitosha Bistritsa	42	(2)
2020–2021	Etar	22	(0)
2021–	Minyor Pernik	73	(0)

International career
2014–2016	Bulgaria U19	10	(1)
- * Club domestic league appearances and goals as of 5 June 2023

Georgi Kupenov (Bulgarian: Георги Купенов; born 24 February 1997) is a Bulgarian footballer who plays as a defender for Minyor Pernik.

== Career ==
Kupenov made his unofficial debut for the first team of Botev Plovdiv on 15 November 2014. He came on as a substitute during the second half of the 2–0 win over the Greek football club Panthrakikos.

On 23 May Kupenov was included in the squad for the 1–2 away defeat from Beroe Stara Zagora but remained an unused substitute.

On 24 February 2016 it was reported that he would be sent on loan until the end of the season to Septemvri Sofia. Two days later it was confirmed that he was sent on loan, but to Dobrudzha Dobrich.

In August 2016 Kupenov joined Septemvri Sofia officially on a loan deal until January 2017. He made his debut for the team on 6 August 2016 in match against Spartak Pleven. After his good performance his loan was extended until 31 June 2017 on 13 January 2017. Sadly, on 9 February 2017 it was reported that he will probably miss the remainder of the season after sustaining an injury.

On 24 August 2017, Kupenov was loaned to Second League club Nesebar.

On 12 July 2018, Kupenov signed with Vitosha Bistritsa.

== International career ==
Kupenov has earned several caps for the Bulgarian U18 team.

In March 2016 Kupenov was in the starting lineup of Bulgaria U19 for the 0–1 defeats from Belgium U19 and Croatia U19.
