= Radko Mutafchiyski =

Bulgarian footballer (born 1989)

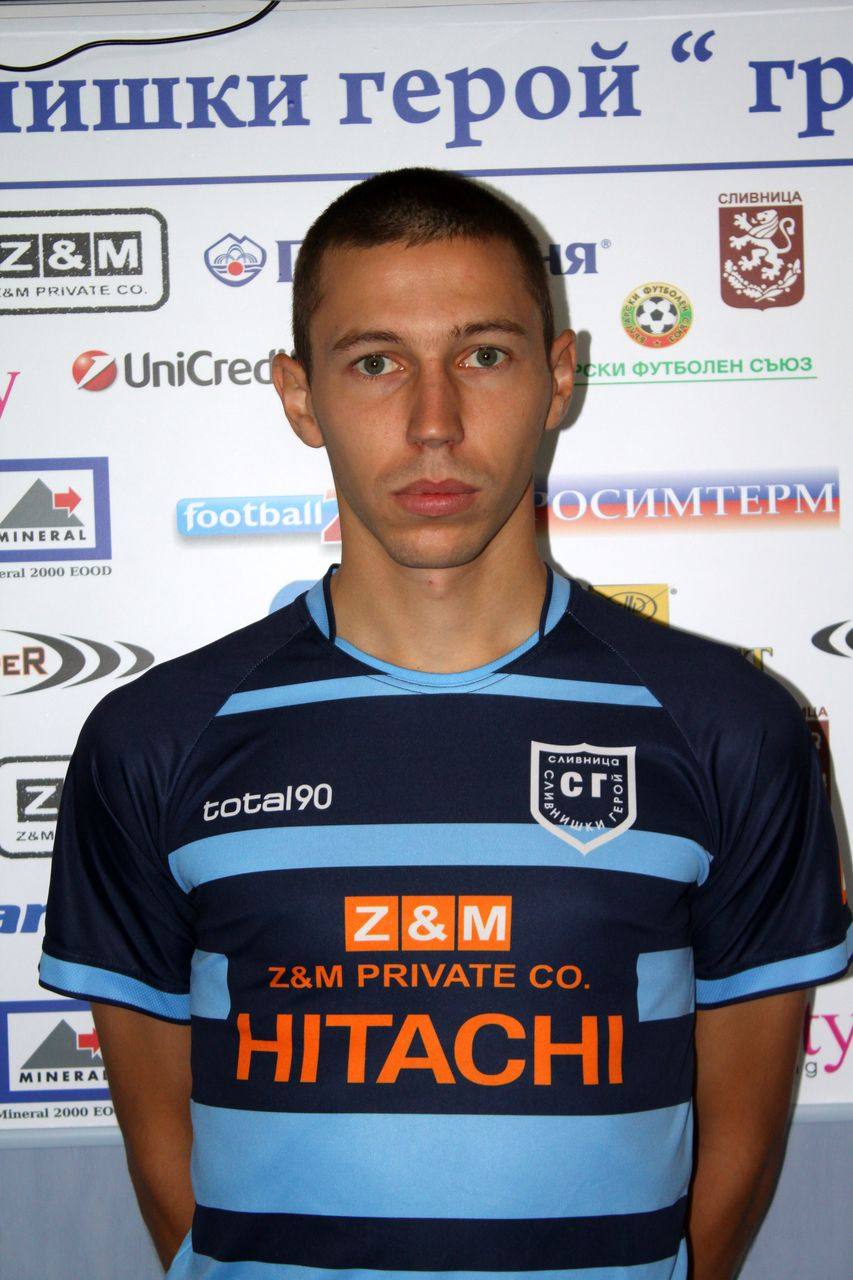

Personal information
- Full name: Radko Petkov Mutafchiyski
- Date of birth: 11 May 1989 (age 37)
- Place of birth: Sofia, Bulgaria
- Height: 1.86 m (6 ft 1 in)
- Position: Centre back

Youth career
- Levski Sofia

Senior career*
| Years | Team | Apps | (Gls) |
| 2009 | Balkan Botevgrad | 12 | (1) |
| 2010–2011 | Chavdar Etropole | 27 | (0) |
| 2012 | Akademik Sofia | 10 | (1) |
| 2012–2013 | Slivnishki Geroy | 26 | (2) |
| 2013–2015 | Horizont Turnovo | 48 | (1) |
| 2016 | Aiginiakos | 2 | (0) |
| 2017 | Apollon Larissa | 3 | (0) |
| 2017–2019 | Vitosha Bistritsa | 26 | (0) |
- * Club domestic league appearances and goals as of 1 June 2019

Radko Mutafchiyski (Bulgarian: Радко Мутафчийски; born 11 May 1989) is a Bulgarian footballer who plays as a defender.
