= Georgi Angelov =

Bulgarian footballer

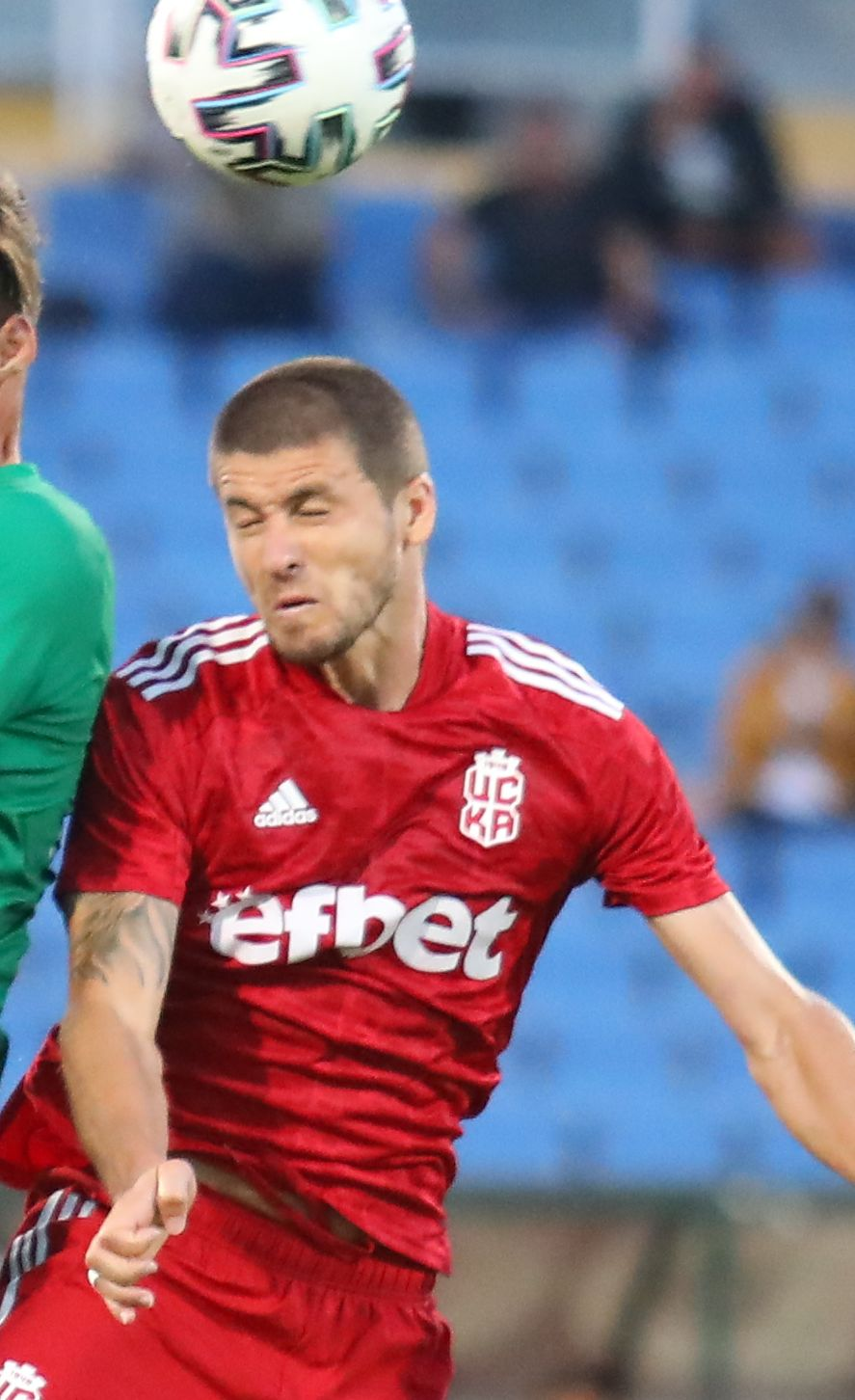
- Georgi Angelov (born November 12, 1990) is a Bulgarian footballer, central defender and defensive midfielder. Athlete of {CSKA 1948 (Sofia).

Personal information
- Full name: Georgi Ivanov Angelov
- Date of birth: 12 November 1990 (age 36)
- Place of birth: Sofia, Bulgaria
- Height: 1.81 m (5 ft 11 1/2 in)
- Positions: Centre-back; defensive midfielder

Senior career*
Years	Team	Apps	(Gls)
2009–2011	Levski Sofia	1	(0)
2011–2014	Bansko	82	(1)
2015–2016	Montana	39	(0)
2016–2017	Vereya	30	(2)
2017–2018	Levski Sofia	4	(0)
2018	→ Vitosha Bistritsa (loan)	15	(0)
2018–2021	Beroe	59	(1)
2021–2022	CSKA 1948	21	(1)
2021–2022	CSKA 1948 II	6	(2)
2022–2024	Etar Veliko Tarnovo	57	(3)

International career^{‡}
2020–	Bulgaria	1	(0)
- * Club domestic league appearances and goals as of 12 June 2024 ‡ National team caps and goals as of 18 November 2020

Georgi Ivanov Angelov (Bulgarian: Георги Иванов Ангелов; born 12 November 1990) is a Bulgarian professional footballer who plays as a centre-back and defensive midfielder.

== Career ==
=== Youth career ===
Georgi Angelov began his career playing for Levski's academy team and he was later promoted to the Levski reserve squad. He made his debut for the first team on 25 November 2009 in a match against Litex Lovech. Angelov came on from the bench as a substitute for Zé Soares in the 74th minute.

=== Bansko ===
In June 2011 Angelov joined Bansko.

=== Levski Sofia ===
On 12 June 2017, Angelov signed a 3-year contract with Levski Sofia. On 28 February 2018, he was loaned to Vitosha Bistritsa for the rest of the season. In June, his contract was terminated by mutual consent.

=== Beroe ===
On 21 June 2018, Angelov signed with Beroe as a free agent.

=== Etar ===
In July 2022, he joined Etar Veliko Tarnovo.

== International career ==
Angelov received his first call up to the Bulgaria national team on 12 November 2020 for the UEFA Nations League matches against Finland on 15 November and the Republic of Ireland on 18 November, making his debut in the 0–0 away draw against the latter.
