= Daniel Peev =

Bulgarian footballer

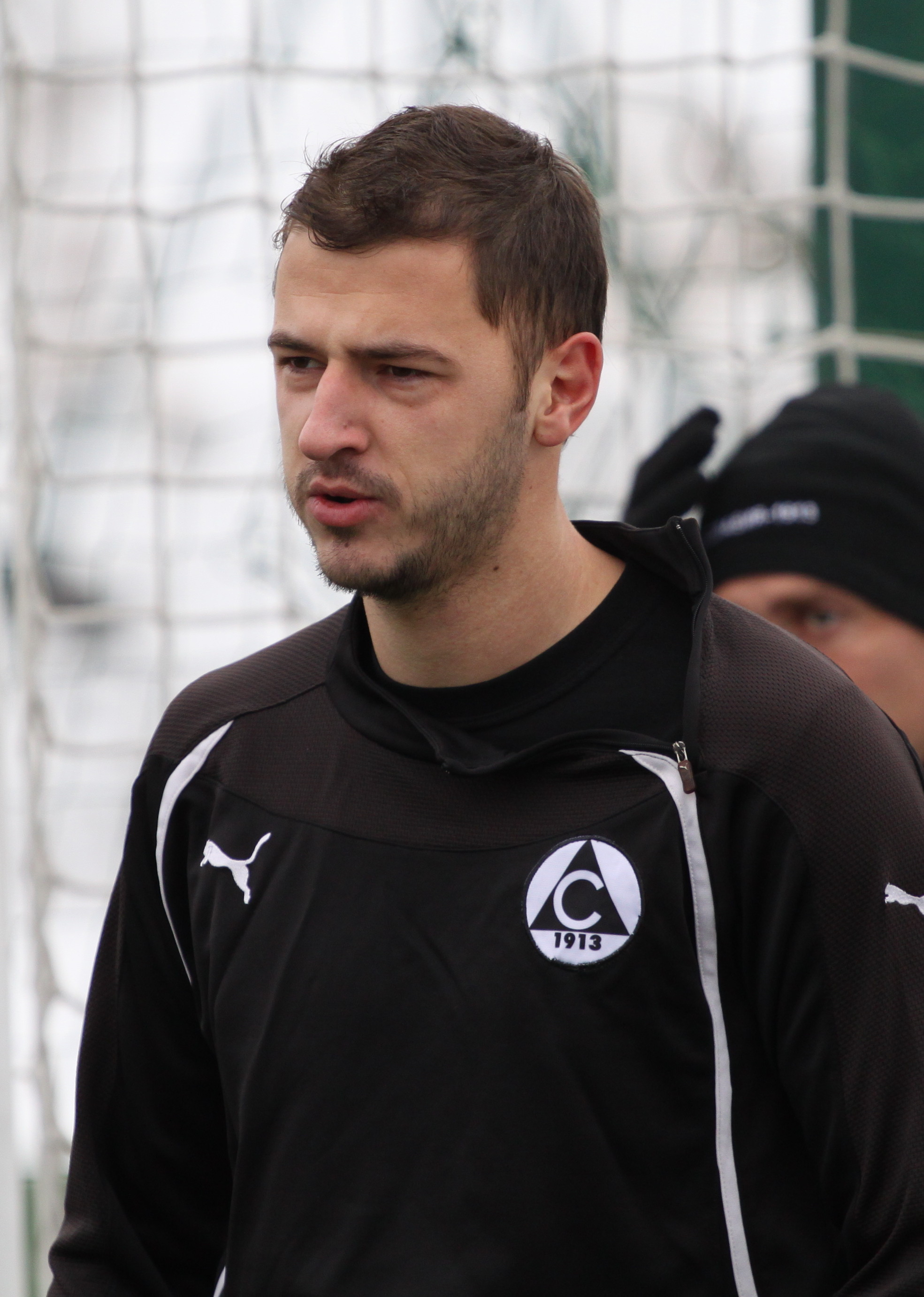

Personal information
- Full name: Daniel Ivanov Peev
- Date of birth: 6 October 1984 (age 42)
- Place of birth: Sofia, Bulgaria
- Height: 1.79 m (5 ft 10 in)
- Position: Midfielder

Youth career
- 1990–2002: Lokomotiv Sofia

Senior career*
Years	Team	Apps	(Gls)
2002–2003	Lokomotiv Sofia	17	(1)
2003–2004	Levski Sofia	0	(0)
2004–2008	Rodopa Smolyan	83	(14)
2008–2009	Pirin Blagoevgrad	48	(11)
2010–2011	Slavia Sofia	55	(8)
2012–2013	Lokomotiv Sofia	56	(9)
2014	Spartak Semey	30	(4)
2015	NK Osijek	4	(1)
2015	Spartak Semey	4	(1)
2016–2017	Lokomotiv Sofia	23	(8)
2017–2018	Vitosha Bistritsa	30	(4)

Managerial career
- 2020: Vitosha Bistritsa (assistant)
- * Club domestic league appearances and goals

Daniel Peev (Bulgarian: Даниел Пеев; born 6 October 1984) is a Bulgarian retired footballer who played as a left attacking midfielder. Daniel is also the younger brother of Georgi Peev.

== Career ==
Daniel had short reigns at Lokomotiv Sofia and Levski Sofia. Later he joined Rodopa Smolyan where he played 4 years, making 83 appearances and scoring 14 goals.

Peev signed a two years contract with Pirin Blagoevgrad in July 2008. On 29 April 2009, he scored the only goal for his team in the 1:0 win against Levski Sofia in a 1/2 final of the Bulgarian Cup. During 2008–09 season, Peev became the only footballer who was able to score against all metropolitan teams - Levski Sofia, CSKA Sofia, Lokomotiv Sofia and Slavia Sofia. In his first season in Pirin, Peev earned 33 appearances, netting seven goals. In the first half of season 2009-10 he earned 15 appearances, netting four goals.

In December 2009, it was announced in the Bulgarian media that Slavia Sofia are having an interest in signing the midfielder to the club. On 28 December, Slavia signed Peev for a two-a-half-year deal.

In 2012 he returned to Lokomotiv Sofia, helping the struggling team avoid relegation.

In January 2014, Peev relocated to Kazakhstan, signing a contract for one year with newly promoted Kazakhstan Premier League club Spartak Semey. Spartak Semey were relegated following the conclusion of the season and Peev joined Croatian club NK Osijek in February 2015.

On 20 June 2017, Peev signed with Vitosha Bistritsa. On 28 April 2018, he scored the only goal in the 1:0 victory over Cherno More Varna, helping the "tigers" from Bistritsa secure their first ever win in the top flight of Bulgarian football.
