= Yuliyan Popev =

Bulgarian footballer

Personal information
- Full name: Yuliyan Strahilov Popev
- Date of birth: 7 July 1986 (age 40)
- Place of birth: Blagoevgrad, Bulgaria
- Height: 1.79 m (5 ft 10 in)
- Position: Left back

Team information
- Current team: Septemvri Simitli
- Number: 6

Senior career*
Years	Team	Apps	(Gls)
2004–2011	Pirin Blagoevgrad	89	(0)
2011	Slavia Sofia	2	(0)
2012	Pirin Blagoevgrad	?	(?)
2012–2013	Bansko	23	(0)
2013–2018	Pirin Blagoevgrad	144	(7)
2019	Vitosha Bistritsa	9	(0)
2019–2020	Septemvri Sofia	20	(1)
2020	Strumska Slava	5	(0)
2020–2023	Pirin Blagoevgrad	39	(0)
2023–	Septemvri Simitli		
- * Club domestic league appearances and goals as of 6 March 2023

Yuliyan Popev (Bulgarian: Юлиян Попев; born 7 July 1986) is a Bulgarian footballer who plays as a left back for Septemvri Simitli.
