= Nikolay Georgiev (footballer) =

Bulgarian footballer

Nikolay Georgiev Николай Георгиев
Personal information
- Full name: Nikolay Ivaylov Georgiev
- Date of birth: 6 September 1998 (age 28)
- Place of birth: Sofia, Bulgaria
- Height: 1.80 m (5 ft 11 in)
- Position: Goalkeeper

Youth career
- 2009–2015: Slavia Sofia
- 2015–2017: Septemvri Sofia

College career
Years	Team	Apps	(Gls)
2017	TeamBath		

Senior career*
Years	Team	Apps	(Gls)
2015–2017	Septemvri Sofia	16	(0)
2018–2019	Vitosha Bistritsa	20	(0)
2020–2021	Yantra Gabrovo	1	(0)
Total		37	(0)
- * Club domestic league appearances and goals as of 1 June 2020

Nikolay Georgiev (Bulgarian: Николай Георгиев; born 6 September 1998) is a Bulgarian retired footballer who played as a goalkeeper.

== Career ==
=== Vitosha Bistritsa ===
==== 2017–18 season ====
Georgiev trained with Vitosha Bistritsa in the summer of 2017, before leaving for England to study in University of Bath and play for their college team. He officially rejoined Vitosha on 28 February 2018. He completed his professional debut on 17 March 2018 in a league match against Beroe, keeping a clean sheet. Georgiev also kept a clean sheet in the following game against Slavia Sofia.

On 25 May 2018, Georgiev saved 2 of the penalties in the penalty shoot-out in the final relegation play-off against Lokomotiv Sofia, keeping his team in the First League.

==== 2018–19 season ====
Georgiev played a major role for Vitosha's excellent start to the 2018/2019 season. The Bistritsa Tigers won three of their opening five games with Georgiev keeping two clean sheets against Slavia Sofia and Vereya Stara Zagora. By mid-August, the team had already collected more points than during their entire previous season in the elite division.

On 25 September 2018, Vitosha faced Botev Galabovo in the first round of the Bulgarian Cup. After a goalless draw and 8–8 in the penalty shoot-out, Georgiev stepped up to take the winning penalty and sent his team to the next round.

=== Retirement ===
Georgiev spend a season in Yantra Gabrovo, before taking the decision to retire in July 2021, aged just 22.

== Career statistics ==
=== Club ===
As of 26 August 2018

Club performance			League		Cup		Continental		Other		Total	
Club	League	Season	Apps	Goals	Apps	Goals	Apps	Goals	Apps	Goals	Apps	Goals
Bulgaria			League		Bulgarian Cup		Europe		Other		Total	
Septemvri Sofia	V Group	2015–16	16	0	0	0	–		–		16	0
Septemvri Sofia	Second League	2016–17	0	0	0	0	–		0	0	0	0
Septemvri Sofia	Total		16	0	0	0	0	0	0	0	16	0
Vitosha Bistritsa	First League	2017–18	7	0	0	0	–		5	0	12	0
Vitosha Bistritsa	First League	2018–19	10	0	1	0	–		–		11	0
Vitosha Bistritsa	Total		17	0	1	0	0	0	6	0	24	0
Career statistics			33	0	1	0	0	0	6	0	40	0
