= Mihail Petrov =

Bulgarian footballer

Personal information
- Full name: Mihail Petrov Petrov
- Date of birth: 1 July 1986 (age 40)
- Place of birth: Bulgaria
- Height: 1.77 m (5 ft 9 1/2 in)
- Position: Defensive midfielder

Team information
- Current team: Vitosha Bistritsa
- Number: 17

Senior career*
Years	Team	Apps	(Gls)
2007–2009	Sportist Svoge	40	(0)
2009–2011	Akademik Sofia	49	(3)
2011	Dorostol Silistra	7	(0)
2012	Botev Vratsa	3	(0)
2012	Dobrudzha Dobrich		
2013	Oborishte	12	(0)
2013	Slivnishki Geroy		
2014	Oborishte	12	(0)
2014–2015	Slivnishki Geroy	27	(2)
2015–2019	Vitosha Bistritsa	71	(3)
2019–2020	Sportist Svoge		(3)
2020–2021	Chavdar Etropole		(0)
2021–	Vitosha Bistritsa	20	(0)
- * Club domestic league appearances and goals as of 8 October 2022

Mihail Petrov (Bulgarian: Михаил Петров; born 1 July 1986) is a Bulgarian footballer who currently plays as a midfielder for Vitosha Bistritsa. He previously played for Sportist Svoge, Akademik Sofia, Dorostol Silistra, Slivnishki Geroy Slivnitsa and Chavdar Etropole.
