= Stefan Hristov (footballer) =

Bulgarian footballer

Personal information
- Full name: Stefan Veselinov Hristov
- Date of birth: 28 August 1989 (age 37)
- Place of birth: Pleven, Bulgaria
- Height: 1.85 m (6 ft 1 in)
- Position: Forward

Team information
- Current team: Spartak Pleven
- Number: 9

Youth career
- Belite Orli Pleven

Senior career*
| Years | Team | Apps | (Gls) |
| 2010–2012 | Spartak Pleven | 31 | (7) |
| 2012–2013 | Partizan Cherven Bryag | 34 | (30) |
| 2014 | Lyubimets 2007 | 13 | (0) |
| 2014–2016 | Spartak Pleven | 39 | (31) |
| 2016 | Etar Veliko Tarnovo | 15 | (6) |
| 2016–2017 | Spartak Pleven | 16 | (4) |
| 2017–2019 | Vitosha Bistritsa | 61 | (12) |
| 2019–2020 | Dunav Ruse | 29 | (7) |
| 2020–2021 | Tsarsko Selo | 25 | (2) |
| 2021 | Montana | 6 | (1) |
| 2022 | Krumovgrad | ? | (1) |
| 2022– | Spartak Pleven | 26 | (2) |
- * Club domestic league appearances and goals as of 5 June 2023

Stefan Hristov (Bulgarian: Стефан Христов; born 28 August 1989) is a Bulgarian professional footballer who plays as a forward for Bulgarian Second League club Spartak Pleven.

== Career ==
In January 2014, Hristov joined Lyubimets 2007. He made his A Group debut in a 2–0 home loss against Lokomotiv Plovdiv on 22 February.

In June 2014, Hristov signed with Spartak Pleven. He scored five goals at Pleven Stadium in a 7–0 thrashing of Sitomir Nikopol on 16 November 2014. He made 23 appearances during the 2014–15 season finishing as the club's top scorer with 29 goals in third division and helped his team to gain promotion in the B Group.

On 8 January 2016 Boncho Genchev announced that Hristov is joining Etar Veliko Tarnovo, to help them promote to B Group.

On 30 December 2016, Hristov signed with Vitosha Bistritsa.

On 14 June 2019, Stefan Hristov signed with Dunav Ruse a 2 years contract.
