= Georgi Kabakov =

Bulgarian football referee (born 1986)

Georgi Kabakov Георги Кабаков
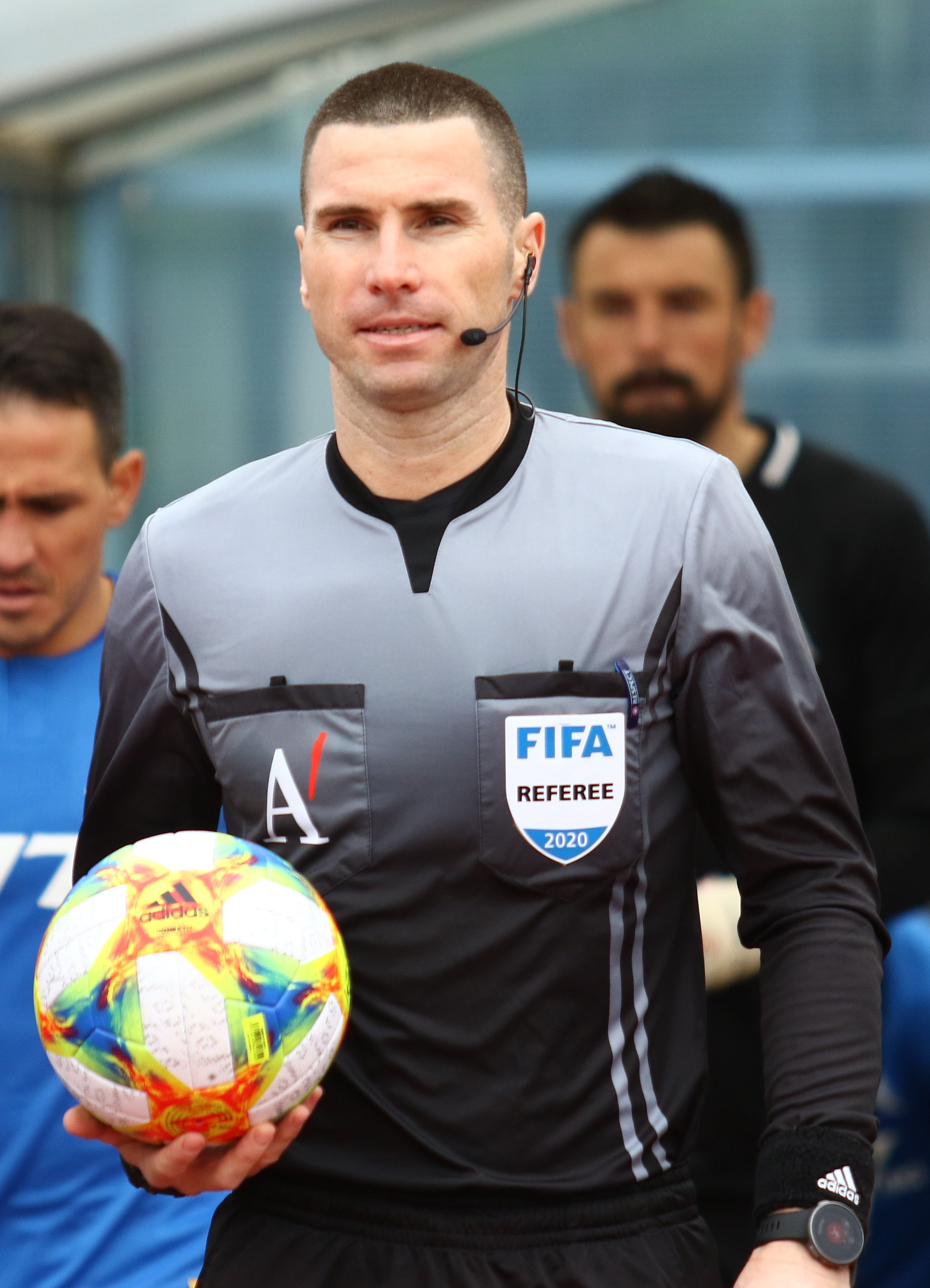
- Full name: Georgi Nikolov Kabakov
- Born: 22 February 1986 (age 40); Plovdiv, PR Bulgaria

Domestic
Years	League	Role
2007–	Bulgarian First League	Referee
2024–	Saudi Pro League	Referee

International
Years	League	Role
2013–	FIFA listed	Referee

Georgi Kabakov (Bulgarian: Георги Кабаков; born 22 February 1986) is a Bulgarian international football referee.

He became a football referee in 2001. In 2007, he was promoted to the Bulgarian top division. Until 2017, he has officiated more than 120 games in it. In 2013, Kabakov was a CORE 13 participant.

In 2013, he became a FIFA referee. He was appointed as a 4th official for the 2015 UEFA U17 Euro in Bulgaria. Kabakov was a referee at the 2015 UEFA U19 Euro in Greece. Until 2017 he has more than 35 international games as a referee.

Kabakov has officiated in the 2016–17, 2017–18 and 2018–19 UEFA Europa League, as well as the UEFA Nations League game between Austria and Northern Ireland.

Kabakov made his debut in the UEFA Champions League group stage. He officiated the match between Valencia CF and Manchester United at Mestalla Stadium, which ended in a 2–1 win for the hosts.
