= Georgi Amzin =

Bulgarian footballer

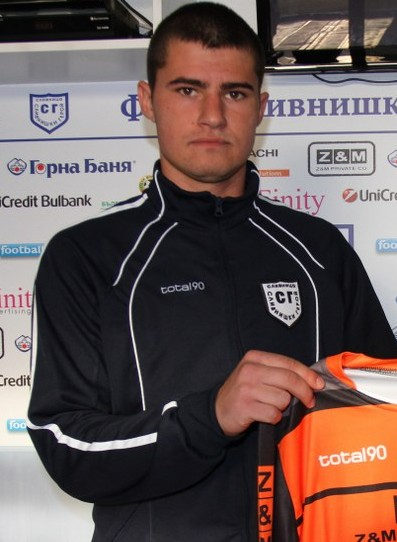

Personal information
- Full name: Georgi Plamenov Amzin
- Date of birth: 2 March 1992 (age 34)
- Place of birth: Sofia, Bulgaria
- Height: 1.87 m (6 ft 2 in)
- Position: Midfielder

Team information
- Current team: Vitosha Bistritsa
- Number: 10

Senior career*
Years	Team	Apps	(Gls)
2010–2012	CSKA Sofia	1	(0)
2011–2012	→ Akademik Sofia (loan)	18	(0)
2013	Slivnishki Geroy	11	(2)
2014–	Vitosha Bistritsa	208	(32)

International career
2010	Bulgaria U19	2	(1)
- * Club domestic league appearances and goals as of 5 June 2023

Georgi Amzin (Bulgarian: Георги Амзин; born 2 March 1992) is a Bulgarian footballer who plays as a midfielder for Vitosha Bistritsa.
