= Rumen Gyonov =

Bulgarian footballer

Personal information
- Full name: Rumen Ivaylov Gyonov
- Date of birth: 9 May 1992 (age 34)
- Place of birth: Dupnitsa, Bulgaria
- Height: 1.80 m (5 ft 11 in)
- Position: Right back

Team information
- Current team: Strumska Slava
- Number: 6

Senior career*
Years	Team	Apps	(Gls)
2011–2014	Germanea	?	(?)
2014–2019	Vitosha Bistritsa	122	(0)
2020	Tsarsko Selo	10	(0)
2020–2021	Lokomotiv GO	10	(0)
2021–2022	Marek Dupnitsa	29	(0)
2022–2025	Rilski Sportist	87	(3)
2025	Vitosha Bistritsa	16	(2)
2026	Germanea	11	(0)
2026–	Strumska Slava	12	(0)
- * Club domestic league appearances and goals as of 1 November 2026

Rumen Gyonov (Bulgarian: Румен Гьонов; born 9 May 1992) is a Bulgarian footballer who plays as a defender for Strumska Slava Radomir.

== Career ==
=== Vitosha Bistritsa ===
Gyonov made his First League debut for Vitosha Bistritsa in their debut match on the top level against Cherno More Varna.

== Career statistics ==
=== Club ===
As of 23 July 2017

Club performance			League		Cup		Continental		Other		Total	
Club	League	Season	Apps	Goals	Apps	Goals	Apps	Goals	Apps	Goals	Apps	Goals
Bulgaria			League		Bulgarian Cup		Europe		Other		Total	
Vitosha Bistritsa	Second League	2016–17	29	0	1	0	–		1	0	31	0
Vitosha Bistritsa	First League	2017–18	2	0	0	0	–		0	0	2	0
Vitosha Bistritsa	Total		31	0	1	0	0	0	1	0	33	0
Career statistics			31	0	1	0	0	0	1	0	33	0
