= Ventsislav Bonev =

Bulgarian professional footballer

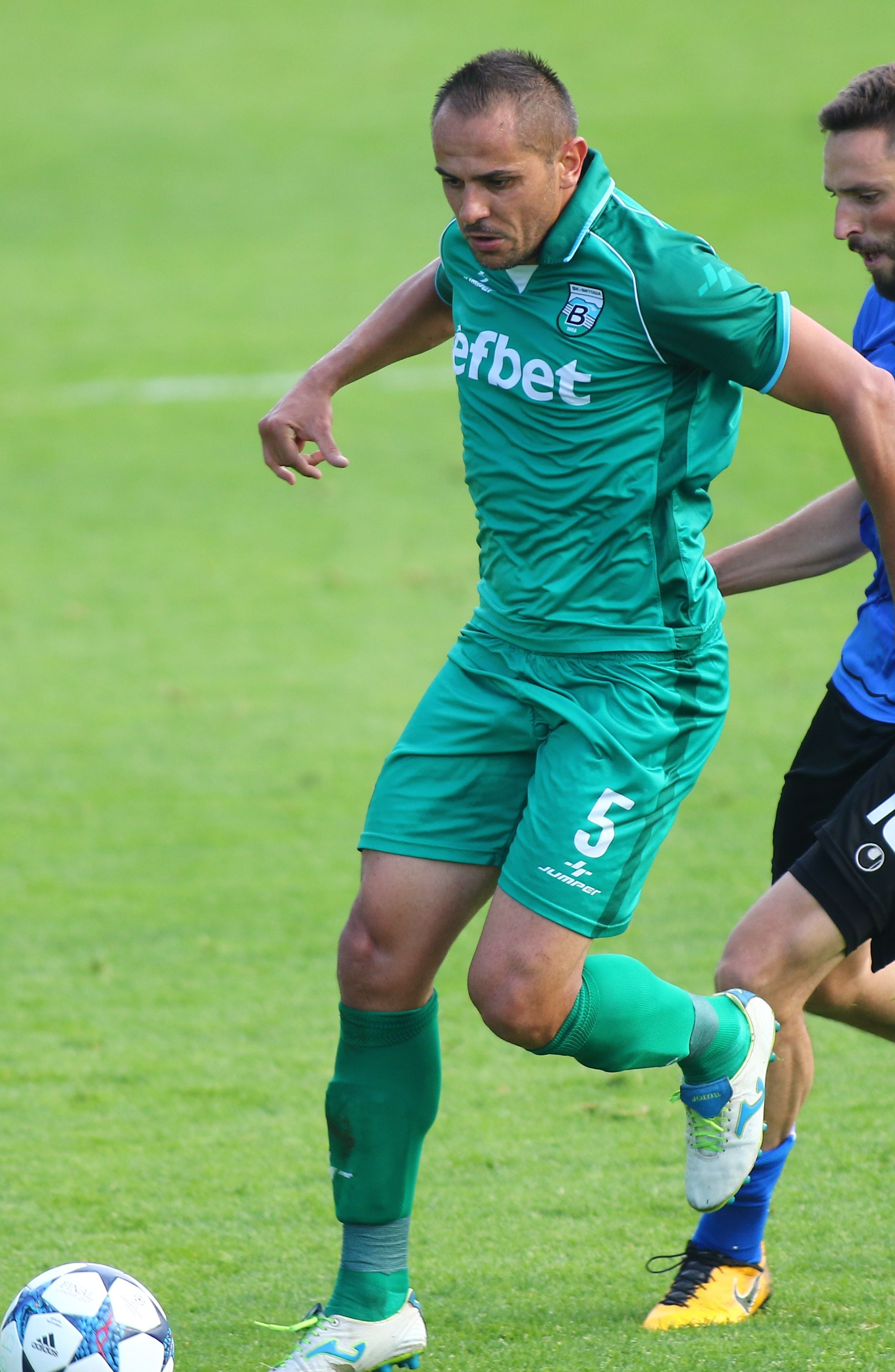

Personal information
- Full name: Ventsislav Georgiev Bonev
- Date of birth: 8 May 1980 (age 46)
- Place of birth: Sofia, Bulgaria
- Height: 1.81 m (5 ft 11 in)
- Position: Defender

Senior career*
| Years | Team | Apps | (Gls) |
| 1998–2003 | Lokomotiv Sofia | 45 | (0) |
| 1999 | → Lokomotiv Plovdiv (loan) | 8 | (0) |
| 2000 | → Minyor Pernik (loan) | 10 | (0) |
| 2003–2006 | Marek Dupnitsa | 61 | (0) |
| 2006–2008 | Naftex Burgas | 47 | (1) |
| 2009–2011 | Chernomorets Burgas | 29 | (1) |
| 2012 | Botev Plovdiv | 11 | (0) |
| 2013 | Vitosha Bistritsa | 12 | (0) |
| 2014 | Marek Dupnitsa | 10 | (0) |
| 2014–2015 | Minyor Pernik | 23 | (1) |
| 2015–2020 | Vitosha Bistritsa | 78 | (1) |
- * Club domestic league appearances and goals

Ventsislav Bonev (Bulgarian: Венцислав Бонев; born 8 May 1980) is a Bulgarian former professional footballer who played as a defender.

He had previously played for Lokomotiv Sofia, Minyor Pernik, Marek Dupnitsa, Naftex Burgas. Bonev signed with Chernomorets Burgas in January 2009. To the end of the 2008–09 season he played in seven matches for the club. On 20 January 2012, he was sold to Botev Plovdiv, but was subsequently released in June.
