= Kristiyan Uzunov =

Bulgarian footballer

Personal information
- Full name: Kristiyan Valeriev Uzunov
- Date of birth: 4 February 1989 (age 37)
- Place of birth: Sofia, Bulgaria
- Height: 1.86 m (6 ft 1 in)
- Position: Defender

Team information
- Current team: Vitosha Bistritsa
- Number: 4

Youth career
- CSKA Sofia

Senior career*
| Years | Team | Apps | (Gls) |
| 2008–2009 | CSKA Sofia | 1 | (0) |
| 2009–2010 | Anagennisi Dherynia | ? | (?) |
| 2010 | Chernomorets Burgas | 0 | (0) |
| 2010 | → Pomorie (loan) | 0 | (0) |
| 2011 | Akademik Sofia | 1 | (0) |
| 2011–2012 | Onisilos Sotira | ? | (?) |
| 2012 | Oborishte | 10 | (1) |
| 2013–2014 | Bansko | 29 | (0) |
| 2014–2015 | Oborishte | 16 | (0) |
| 2015– | Vitosha Bistritsa | 114 | (3) |

International career
| 2008 | Bulgaria U19 | | |
- * Club domestic league appearances and goals as of 5 June 2023

Kristiyan Uzunov (Bulgarian: Кристиян Узунов; born 4 February 1989) is a Bulgarian footballer who plays as a defender for Vitosha Bistritsa. He was raised in CSKA Sofia's youth teams.

Made his official debut for CSKA in the last match of 2008-09 season in the Bulgarian A PFG (Professional Football Group) against Lokomotiv Mezdra.

== International career ==
Uzunov was formerly part of the Bulgaria national under-19 football team. With the team he participated in the 2008 UEFA European Under-19 Football Championship in the Czech Republic.
