= Ivaylo Lazarov =

Bulgarian footballer

Personal information
- Full name: Ivaylo Stefanov Lazarov
- Date of birth: 11 April 1992 (age 34)
- Place of birth: Dobrich, Bulgaria
- Height: 1.86 m (6 ft 1 in)
- Position: Midfielder

Team information
- Current team: Septemvri Tervel
- Number: 8

Youth career
- 2000–2010: Dobrudzha

Senior career*
Years	Team	Apps	(Gls)
2010–2013	Dobrudzha	46	(3)
2014	Dunav Ruse	10	(0)
2014	Dobrudzha	13	(0)
2015–2016	Chernomorets Balchik	37	(12)
2016–2019	Vitosha Bistritsa	78	(7)
2019–2020	Dunav Ruse	27	(2)
2020	Dobrudzha	7	(0)
2020–2021	Hebar	15	(0)
2021	Neftochimic	11	(0)
2022–2023	Dobrudzha	44	(9)
2023–	Septemvri Tervel	81	(26)
- * Club domestic league appearances and goals as of 1 June 2026

Ivaylo Lazarov (Bulgarian: Ивайло Лазаров; born 11 April 1992) is a Bulgarian professional footballer who plays as a midfielder for Septemvri Tervel.

== Career ==
=== Vitosha Bistritsa ===
Lazarov joined Vitosha Bistritsa in 2016 from Chernomorets Balchik. He completed his full professional debut for the team on 22 July 2017 in a league match against Cherno More Varna.

=== Dunav Ruse ===
On 24 June 2019, Lazarov signed with Dunav Ruse.
