= Angel Stoyanov (footballer) =

Bulgarian footballer

Personal information
- Full name: Angel Bozhidarov Stoyanov
- Date of birth: 31 December 1986 (age 39)
- Place of birth: Sofia, Bulgaria
- Height: 1.77 m (5 ft 9 1/2 in)
- Position: Midfielder

Senior career*
Years	Team	Apps	(Gls)
2009–2011	Levski Dragalevtsi		
2011–2019	Vitosha Bistritsa	163	(27)

International career
2013	Southeast Bulgaria	6	(2)
- * Club domestic league appearances and goals as of 16 December 2018

Angel Stoyanov (Bulgarian: Ангел Стоянов; born 31 December 1986) is a Bulgarian retired footballer who played as a midfielder.

== Career ==
=== Vitosha Bistritsa ===
Being a part of the team since 2011, Stoyanov made his fully professional debut for the team in their first season on the top level in the league match against Levski Sofia on 30 July 2017.

== International career ==
Stoyanov was part of Southeast Bulgaria's amateur team.
