= Kristiyan Kochilov =

Bulgarian footballer

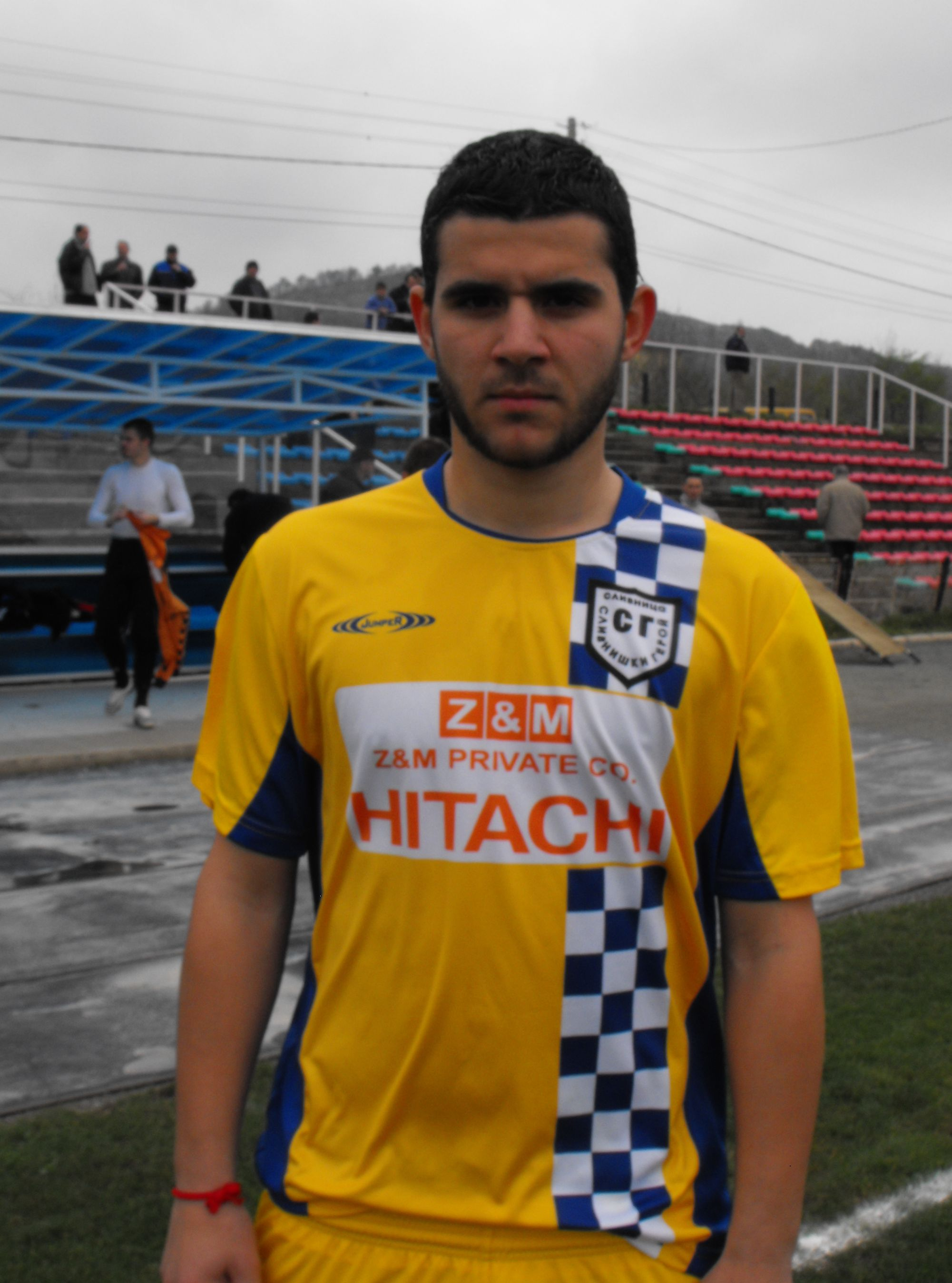
- Portrait of Kristiyan Kochilov

Personal information
- Full name: Kristiyan Lyudmilov Kochilov
- Date of birth: 3 April 1990 (age 36)
- Place of birth: Vratsa, Bulgaria
- Height: 1.74 m (5 ft 8 1/2 in)
- Position: Midfielder

Youth career
- Lokomotiv Sofia

Senior career*
Years	Team	Apps	(Gls)
2009–2015	Slivnishki Geroy	148	(21)
2015–2020	Vitosha Bistritsa	113	(7)
2020–2021	Sportist Svoge	17	(1)
2021–2023	Vitosha Bistritsa	69	(12)
2023–2026	Rilski Sportist	86	(7)
- * Club domestic league appearances and goals as of 5 une 2023

Kristiyan Kochilov (Bulgarian: Кристиян Кочилов; born 3 April 1990) is a Bulgarian professional footballer who plays as a midfielder.

== Career ==
=== Vitosha Bistritsa ===
Kochilov joined Vitosha Bistritsa in 2015 from Slivnishki Geroy. He completed his fully professional debut for the team on 22 July 2017 in a first division match against Cherno More Varna.
