= Todor Gochev =

Bulgarian footballer

Personal information
- Full name: Todor Dobrinov Gochev
- Date of birth: 15 April 1993 (age 33)
- Place of birth: Burgas, Bulgaria
- Height: 1.78 m (5 ft 10 in)
- Position: Defender

Youth career
- Levski Sofia

Senior career*
| Years | Team | Apps | (Gls) |
| 2013 | Shumen | | |
| 2014 | Montana | 6 | (0) |
| 2014–2015 | PFC Burgas | 17 | (0) |
| 2015–2016 | Neftochimic | 19 | (0) |
| 2016–2017 | Botev Vratsa | 24 | (0) |
| 2017–2019 | Vitosha Bistritsa | 60 | (0) |
| 2020–2021 | Hebar | 16 | (0) |
- * Club domestic league appearances and goals as of 26 October 2021

Todor Gochev (Bulgarian: Тодор Гочев; born 15 April 1993) is a Bulgarian footballer who plays as a defender.

== Career ==
=== Vitosha Bistritsa ===
On 9 July 2017 Gochev signed with Bulgarian First League debutant Vitosha Bistritsa. He made his debut for the team on 22 July 2017 in match against the other debutant in First League - Etar Veliko Tarnovo.
