= Daniel Kutev =

Bulgarian footballer

Personal information
- Full name: Daniel Venelin Kutev
- Date of birth: 6 March 1991 (age 35)
- Place of birth: Zlatograd, Bulgaria
- Height: 1.80 m (5 ft 11 in)
- Positions: Winger; forward

Team information
- Current team: Levski Lom
- Number: 11

Senior career*
Years	Team	Apps	(Gls)
2010–2011	Rodopa Smolyan	30	(17)
2011–2012	Echinos Spor		
2012–2014	Skoda Xanthi	1	(0)
2013	→ Kavala (loan)	9	(0)
2014	→ Nestos Chrysoupoli (loan)		
2014–2016	Nestos Chrysoupoli		
2016	Botev Plovdiv	14	(0)
2017	Nestos Chrysoupoli		
2017–2020	Vitosha Bistritsa	42	(2)
2021–	Levski Lom		
- * Club domestic league appearances and goals as of 13 July 2020

Daniel Kutev (Bulgarian: Даниел Кутев; born 6 March 1991) is a Bulgarian professional footballer who plays as a winger for Levski Lom.

== Career ==
Born in Zlatograd, Kutev began his career playing for Rodopa Smolyan. During 2010–11 season, he scored 17 goals in the South-East V AFG, the third division of Bulgarian football.

On 2 June 2012, following a short trial period Kutev signed for Skoda Xanthi on a five-year deal. He made his Super League Greece debut on 10 November in a 1–0 away loss against PAS Giannina, coming on as a substitute for Benjamin Onwuachi.

On 12 January 2013, Kutev was loaned out to Football League side Kavala for the rest of the season. On the following day, he played his first game, coming on as a substitute in the 64th minute in a 1–0 win over Fokikos at home.

On 15 June 2016, Kutev joined Botev Plovdiv on a trial. Following his good performance in friendly games he signed a full-time contract. He was released in January 2017.

On 9 July 2017, Kutev signed with newly promoted Vitosha Bistritsa.

== Career statistics ==
(Correct as of March 31, 2013)

Club	Season	League		Cup		Continental		Total	
Club	Season	Apps	Goals	Apps	Goals	Apps	Goals	Apps	Goals
Skoda Xanthi	2012–13	1	0	0	0	-	-	1	0
Kavala	2012–13	9	0	2	0	-	-	11	0
Total		10	0	2	0	0	0	12	0
