= FC Vitosha Bistritsa =

Association football club in Bulgaria

- Full name: Football Club Vitosha Bistritsa
- Nickname: "The Bistritsa Tigers"
- Short name: Vitosha
- Founded: 1958; 68 years ago
- Ground: Stadion Bistritsa
- Capacity: 2,500
- Manager: Nikolay Hristozov
- League: Southwest Third League
- 2024–25: Southwest Third League, 9th
- Website: www.fcvitosha.bg
| Home colours | Away colours | Third colours |

FC Vitosha (Bulgarian: ФК Витоша) is a Bulgarian association football club based in Bistritsa, Sofia City Province, which competes in the Southwest Third League, the third tier of Bulgarian football. It is named after the Vitosha mountain range, where Bistritsa is located.

Vitosha was founded in 1958, however, the club spent the majority of its history playing in lower leagues. In 2017, Vitosha managed to promote to the First League for the first time ever. The club was relegated after the 2019–20 season and re-founded in 2021.

The club became notable for having Bulgaria's prime minister, Boyko Borisov, as a registered player of the squad in the lower divisions. The increased popularity of the club due to Borisov's presence led to its coach and players being featured on the TV series BNT Taxi in 2011.

== History ==
=== 1958–2007: Regional divisions ===
The club was founded in 1958 and played in the regional divisions until 2007 when it gained promotion to the third division. In the 1972–73 Bulgarian Cup they entered the preliminary round but eventually lost to Pirin Blagoevgrad with a 3–0 result.

=== 2007–2016: Amateur division and B Group breakthrough ===
From 2007 to 2016 the team played regularly in the V Group. In May 2012, Vitosha claimed the Amateur League Cup for the first time in their history, eliminating Dve Mogili 2–1 in the final match. During the 2012-13 V Group, the club ranked second in the South-West V Group and achieved promotion to Bulgaria's professional B Group for the first time in their history.

During the 2013–14 Bulgarian Cup, Vitosha eliminated Bansko with an aggregate score of 3–1 to advance to the Round of 16 of the Bulgarian Cup for the first time ever. Previously, their highest achievement had been reaching the Round of 32 in the 1972 Bulgarian Cup.

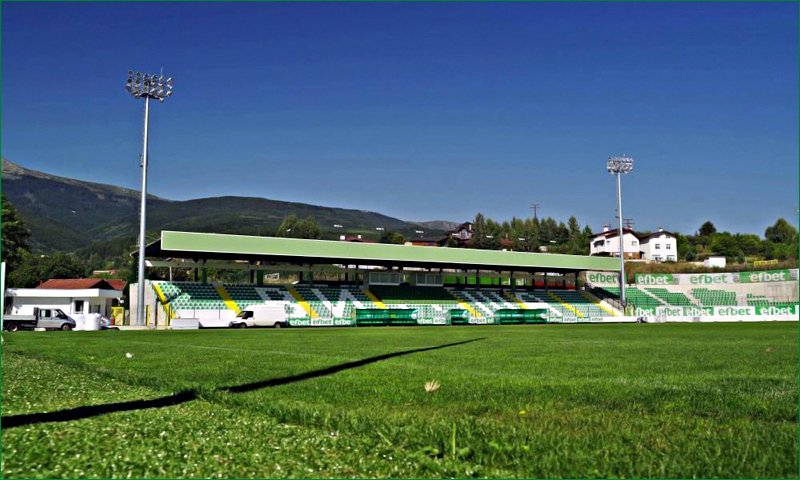
Vitosha Stadium

=== 2016–2020: From third tier to first tier, then dissolution ===
Vitosha finished the 2015–16 V Group in second place after CSKA Sofia, but due to the adoption of a new league structure for the Second League, they were promoted again. In the meantime, the club started investing in a youth academy consisting of five youth teams for the 2016–17 season and reconstruction works on the club's stadium. On 3 May 2017, Vitosha presented an update of their current club crest. A few days later, on 8 May 2017, they also signed a sponsorship agreement with Bulgarian gambling company Efbet for the upcoming two seasons.

On 2 June 2017, Vitosha won the play-off relegation match against Neftochimic Burgas and achieved promotion to the top division for first time in their history.

Despite their poor performance during the regular season of their maiden season in the top tier, where Vitosha finished last with the worst defense and attack, and gaining only one victory, Vitosha avoided relegation from the 2017–18 First League, winning the play-offs against Pirin Blagoevgrad and Lokomotiv Sofia. Vitosha improved their performance in the next season, avoiding relegation once more.

The 2019-20 season was disastrous for Vitosha, however. The team finished in the last place in the regular season, with only one win. Since the number of matches in the second phase was reduced by half for the season, Vitosha was mathematically relegated even before the relegation phase started. This ended their three-year stay in the Bulgarian top tier.

On 28 September 2020, after several matches from the new season were completed, the first team was dissolved while keeping only the youth teams.

=== 2021–present: Re-founding and amateur leagues ===
On 25 May 2021 the team announced that they would join the Third League playing the most with youth academy players and Nikolay Hristozov as manager. At the end of the 2021–22 season, Vitosha finished in second place in the Southwest Third League, but the team was promoted to the Second League after Tsarsko Selo, which was relegated from the First League, announced its dissolution, thus leaving an empty spot in the Second League. The Bulgarian Football Union gave Vitosha the place in the Second League, since they had accumulated the most points out of all second-placed teams from the regional third leagues.

During the 2022–23 season, while competing in the Second League, Vitosha also qualified for the Bulgarian Cup. Vitosha made a surprising performance by eliminating first tier side Botev Vratsa in the round of 32, after eliminating Chernolomets Popovo in the first round. Vitosha set up a meeting with another First League team, Lokomotiv Sofia in the round of 16. They lost this game 3–0.

== Honours ==
- Cup of Bulgarian Amateur Football League
  - Winners (2): 2012, 2022

== Players ==
=== Current squad ===
As of 1 December 2025

Note: Flags indicate national team as defined under FIFA eligibility rules; some limited exceptions apply. Players may hold more than one non-FIFA nationality.

| No. | Pos. | Nation | Player |
|---|---|---|---|
| 1 | GK | BUL | Valentin Galev |
| 5 | DF | BUL | Giulio Charlov |
| 6 | DF | BUL | Rumen Gyonov |
| 7 | MF | BUL | Dimitar Goranov |
| 8 | MF | BUL | Alpay Ramadan |
| 9 | MF | BUL | Martin Zimbilev |
| 11 | MF | BUL | Kiril Yanakiev |
| 15 | DF | BUL | Kristiyan Atanasov |
| 17 | MF | BUL | Anton Bakalov |
| 18 | DF | BUL | Stanislav Petrov |

| No. | Pos. | Nation | Player |
|---|---|---|---|
| 19 | DF | BUL | Viliyan Spasov |
| 21 | MF | BUL | Radoslav Iliev |
| 22 | MF | BUL | Kristian Nikolov |
| 25 | GK | BUL | Kaloyan Petkov |
| 26 | MF | BUL | Georgi Ivanov |
| 27 | DF | BUL | Slavi Paskalev |
| 41 | FW | BUL | Deyan Hristov |
| 77 | MF | BUL | Tsvetomir Vachev |
| 82 | FW | BUL | Lyubomir Sarafski |
| 88 | MF | BUL | Milen Ivanov |

=== Foreign players ===
Up to one non-EU national can be registered and given a squad number for the first team in the Second League. Those non-EU nationals with European ancestry can claim citizenship from the nation their ancestors came from. If a player does not have European ancestry he can claim Bulgarian citizenship after playing in Bulgaria for 5 years.

EU Nationals

EU Nationals (Dual citizenship)

Non-EU Nationals

== Notable players ==
Had international caps for their respective countries, held any club record, or had more than 100 league appearances. Players whose name is listed in bold represented their countries.

Bulgaria

- (Bulgaria) Georgi Amzin
- (Bulgaria) **Georgi Angelov**
- (Bulgaria) Ventsislav Bonev
- (Bulgaria) **Valeri Bojinov**
- (Bulgaria) Boyko Borisov
- (Bulgaria) **Emil Gargorov**
- (Bulgaria) Rumen Gyonov
- (Bulgaria) **Hristo Ivanov**
- (Bulgaria) **Mihail Ivanov**
- (Bulgaria) Kristiyan Kochilov
- (Bulgaria) Lachezar Kotev
- (Bulgaria) **Martin Lukov**
- (Bulgaria) **Veselin Minev**
- (Bulgaria) **Yordan Minev**
- (Bulgaria) **Apostol Popov**
- (Bulgaria) Chetin Sadula
- (Bulgaria) **Georgi Sarmov**
- (Bulgaria) Angel Stoyanov
- (Bulgaria) Kristiyan Uzunov
- (Bulgaria) Yordan Varbanov
- (Bulgaria) Hristiyan Vasilev

== Goalscoring and appearance records ==
As of 1 December 2019

**Most appearances for the club in First League**

| Rank | Name | Career | Appearances |
|---|---|---|---|
| 1 | (Bulgaria) Chetin Sadula | 2013–2020 | 69 |
| 2 | (Bulgaria) Rumen Gyonov | 2014–2019 | 68 |
| 3 | (Bulgaria) Lachezar Kotev | 2016–2020 | 67 |
| 4 | (Bulgaria) Todor Gochev | 2017–2019 | 62 |
| 5 | (Bulgaria) **Georgi Amzin** | 2014– | 60 |
| – | (Bulgaria) Stefan Hristov | 2017–2019 | 60 |
| 7 | (Bulgaria) Grigor Dolapchiev | 2017–2019 | 56 |
| 8 | (Bulgaria) Kristiyan Kochilov | 2015–2020 | 55 |
| – | (Bulgaria) Ivaylo Lazarov | 2016–2019 | 55 |
| 10 | (Bulgaria) Petko Tsankov | 2017–2019 | 54 |

As of 1 December 2019

**Most goals for the club in First League**

| Rank | Name | Career | Goals |
|---|---|---|---|
| 1 | (Bulgaria) Grigor Dolapchiev | 2017–2019 | 11 |
| 2 | (Bulgaria) Stefan Hristov | 2017–2019 | 9 |
| 3 | (Bulgaria) **Emil Gargorov** | 2019– | 7 |
| 4 | (Bulgaria) Ivaylo Lazarov | 2016–2019 | 6 |
| 5 | (Bulgaria) Chetin Sadula | 2013–2020 | 5 |
| 6 | (Bulgaria) Daniel Peev | 2017–2018 | 4 |
| 7 | (Bulgaria) Daniel Kutev | 2017–2020 | 3 |
| 8 | (Bulgaria) Ivan Valchanov | 2018–2019 | 2 |
| – | (Bulgaria) Iliya Dimitrov | 2019–2020 | 2 |

== Personnel ==
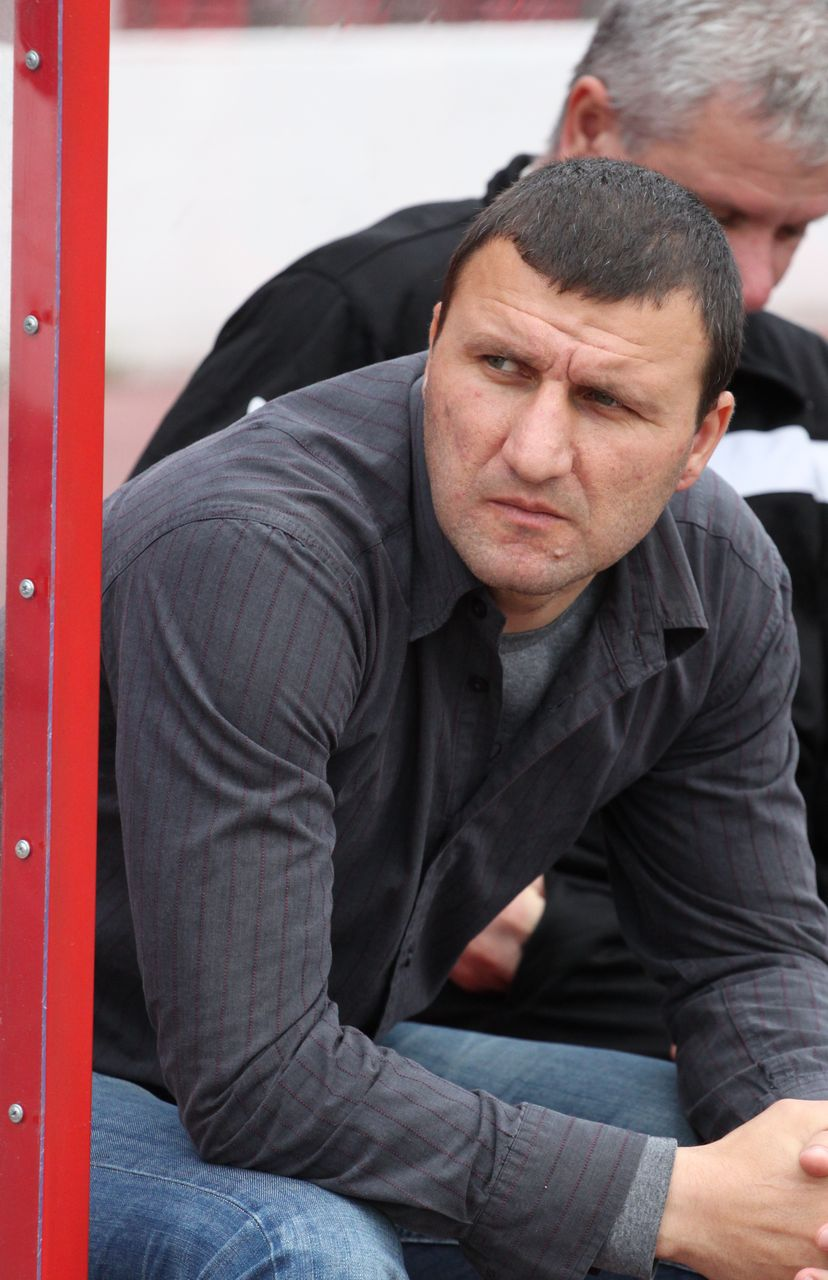
Kostadin Angelov who was head coach of the team between 2015 and 2018.

=== Manager history ===
| Dates | Name | Honours |
|---|---|---|
| 1959–2007 | Unknown | |
| 2007–2014 | (Bulgaria) Yasin Mishaui | 1 Amateur Cup title |
| 2014 | (Bulgaria) Nikolay Todorov | |
| 2014–2015 | (Bulgaria) Borislav Georgiev | |
| 2015–2018 | (Bulgaria) Kostadin Angelov | |
| 2018–2019 | (Bulgaria) Rosen Kirilov | |
| 2019 | (Bulgaria) Engibar Engibarov | |
| 2019–2020 | (Bulgaria) Asen Bukarev | |
| 2020 | (Bulgaria) Kostadin Angelov | |
| 2021– | (Bulgaria) Nikolay Hristozov | |

=== Current technical body ===
| Position | Name | Nationality |
|---|---|---|
| Head coach | Nikolay Hristozov | (Bulgaria) |
| Assistant coach | Yordan Varbanov | (Bulgaria) |
| Goalkeeper coach | Valentin Galev | (Bulgaria) |

== League stats ==
=== Seasons ===
2017–18 FC Vitosha Bistritsa season

2018–19 FC Vitosha Bistritsa season

2019–20 FC Vitosha Bistritsa season

=== Past seasons ===
| Season | League | Place | W | D | L | GF | GA | Pts | Bulgarian Cup |
|---|---|---|---|---|---|---|---|---|---|
| 2010–11 | V Group (III) | 3 | 27 | 4 | 7 | 70 | 24 | 85 | not qualified |
| 2011–12 | V Group | 6 | 19 | 4 | 13 | 53 | 36 | 61 | not qualified |
| 2012–13 | V Group | 2 | 22 | 5 | 3 | 52 | 10 | 71 | not qualified |
| 2013–14 | B Group (II) | 11 | 7 | 7 | 12 | 22 | 24 | 28 | Second round |
| 2014–15 | V Group (III) | 4 | 18 | 6 | 6 | 57 | 22 | 60 | not qualified |
| 2015–16 | V Group | 2 | 23 | 5 | 4 | 72 | 16 | 74 | not qualified |
| 2016–17 | Second League (II) | 3 | 15 | 8 | 7 | 37 | 23 | 53 | First round |
| 2017–18 | First League (I) | 13 | 2 | 11 | 24 | 22 | 68 | 17 | First round |
| 2018–19 | First League | 13 | 13 | 5 | 19 | 35 | 50 | 44 | Second round |
**Green marks a season followed by promotion, red a season followed by relegation.**
