= 2018–19 First Professional Football League (Bulgaria) =

95th season of top-tier football league in Bulgaria

First Professional Football League
- Season: 2018–19
- Dates: 20 July 2018 – 30 May 2019
- Champions: Ludogorets Razgrad (8th title)
- Relegated: Vereya; Septemvri Sofia
- Champions League: Ludogorets Razgrad
- Europa League: CSKA Sofia; Levski Sofia; Lokomotiv Plovdiv
- Matches: 252
- Goals: 615 (2.44 per match)
- Top goalscorer: Stanislav Kostov (24 goals)
- Best goalkeeper: Vytautas Černiauskas (20 clean sheets)
- Biggest home win: Levski Sofia 7–0 Vereya (26 October 2018)
- Biggest away win: Cherno More 1–5 Septemvri Sofia (4 August 2018)
- Highest scoring: Slavia Sofia 3–5 Dunav Ruse (12 April 2019)
- Longest winning run: 11 games by Ludogorets
- Longest unbeaten run: 19 games Ludogorets
- Longest winless run: 32 games Vereya
- Longest losing run: 10 games Septemvri Sofia
- Highest attendance: 23,000; CSKA Sofia 0–1 Levski Sofia (29 September 2018)
- Lowest attendance: 30; Septemvri Sofia 2–1 Dunav Ruse (9 December 2018)
- All statistics correct as of 29 May 2019.

The 2018–19 First Professional Football League was the 95th season of the top division of the Bulgarian football league system, the 71st since a league format was adopted for the national competition of A Group as a top tier of the pyramid and also the 3rd season of the First Professional Football League, which decides the Bulgarian champion. The season began on 20 July 2018 and finished on 30 May 2019. Ludogorets Razgrad became champions for the 8th consecutive time, on the final matchday of the season, with a 4–1 home win over Cherno More Varna.

== Teams ==
Fourteen teams are competing in the league – the top thirteen teams from the previous season, and one team promoted from the Second League.

Botev Vratsa were promoted as champions of the 2017–18 Second League. The promoted club replaced Pirin Blagoevgrad, who were relegated after elimination in the relegation play-offs by Vitosha Bistritsa. Botev Vratsa return to the top tier after a 5-year absence, while Pirin Blagoevgrad ended a 3-year stay in the top flight.

=== Stadia and locations ===
Location of teams in 2018–19 First League
Sofia 2018–19 First League football clubs

Team	Location	Stadium	Capacity (seating)
Beroe	Stara Zagora	Beroe	12,128
Botev	Plovdiv	Botev 1912 Football Complex	4,000
Botev	Vratsa	Hristo Botev	12,000
Cherno More	Varna	Ticha	8,250
CSKA	Sofia	Balgarska Armiya	18,495
Dunav	Ruse	Gradski	12,400
Etar	Veliko Tarnovo	Ivaylo	18,000
Levski	Sofia	Vivacom Arena - Georgi Asparuhov	25,000
Lokomotiv	Plovdiv	Lokomotiv	13,000
Ludogorets	Razgrad	Ludogorets Arena	10,422
Septemvri	Sofia	Vasil Levski National Stadium	43,230
Slavia	Sofia	Slavia; Vasil Levski National Stadium	25,556; 43,230
Vereya	Stara Zagora	Trace Arena	3,500
Vitosha	Bistritsa	Stadion Nikolay Stanislavov	2,500

=== Personnel and sponsorship ===
Note: Flags indicate national team as has been defined under FIFA eligibility rules. Players and managers may hold more than one non-FIFA nationality.

Team	Manager	Captain	Kit manufacturer	Shirt sponsor	Additional
Beroe	(Bulgaria) Aleksandar Tomash	(Bulgaria) Martin Kamburov	Uhlsport	—	Refan, Ajax Group
Botev Plovdiv	(Bulgaria) Nikolay Kirov	(Bulgaria) Lachezar Baltanov	Uhlsport	WinBet	—
Botev Vratsa	(Bulgaria) Sasho Angelov	(Bulgaria) Ivaylo Mihaylov	Joma	WinBet	Kozloduy NPP
CSKA Sofia	(Bulgaria) Dobromir Mitov	(Bulgaria) Nikolay Bodurov	adidas	A1 Bulgaria	WinBet, Baristo
Cherno More	(Bulgaria) Ilian Iliev	(Bulgaria) Georgi Iliev	Uhlsport	Armeets	—
Dunav	(Bulgaria) Lyudmil Kirov	(Bulgaria) Martin Kovachev	Joma	WinBet	SanSi
Etar	(Bulgaria) Krasimir Balakov	(Bulgaria) Ivan Stoyanov	Joma	WinBet	—
Levski Sofia	(Bulgaria) Georgi Todorov	(Bulgaria) Zhivko Milanov	Nike	Efbet	Strabag
Lokomotiv Plovdiv	(Bosnia and Herzegovina) Bruno Akrapović	(Bulgaria) Bircent Karagaren	Uhlsport	Efbet	General Broker
Ludogorets	(Bulgaria) Stoycho Stoev	(Bulgaria) Svetoslav Dyakov	Umbro	Efbet	Vivacom, Spetema
Septemvri Sofia	(Bulgaria) Hristo Arangelov	(Bulgaria) Boris Galchev	Uhlsport	Efbet	—
Slavia Sofia	(Bulgaria) Zlatomir Zagorčić	(Bulgaria) Georgi Petkov	Joma	bet365	—
Vereya	(Bulgaria) Ivan Vutov	(Bulgaria) Ivo Ivanov	Uhlsport	Efbet	Spetema
Vitosha Bistritsa	(Bulgaria) Rosen Kirilov	(Bulgaria) Georgi Amzin	Jumper	Efbet	—

Note: Individual clubs may wear jerseys with advertising. However, only one sponsorship is permitted per jersey for official tournaments organised by UEFA in addition to that of the kit manufacturer (exceptions are made for non-profit organisations). Clubs in the domestic league can have more than one sponsorship per jersey which can feature on the front of the shirt, incorporated with the main sponsor or in place of it; or on the back, either below the squad number or on the collar area. Shorts also have space available for advertisement.

=== Managerial changes ===
Team	Outgoing manager	Manner of departure	Date of vacancy	Position in table	Incoming manager	Date of appointment
Vitosha Bistritsa	(Bulgaria) Kostadin Angelov	Promoted to Director of football	30 May 2018	Pre-season	(Bulgaria) Rosen Kirilov	1 June 2018
Vereya	(Brazil) Elias	Demoted to assistant^{1}	4 June 2018	Pre-season	(Bulgaria) Ivan Kolev	4 June 2018
Ludogorets	(Bulgaria) Dimitar Dimitrov	Mutual consent	6 June 2018	Pre-season	(Brazil) Paulo Autuori	6 June 2018
CSKA Sofia	(Bulgaria) Hristo Yanev	End of caretaker tenure	7 June 2018	Pre-season	(England) Nestor El Maestro	7 June 2018
Levski Sofia	(Italy) Delio Rossi	Mutual consent	18 July 2018	Pre-season	(Bulgaria) Todor Simov (caretaker)	18 July 2018
Levski Sofia	(Bulgaria) Todor Simov	End of caretaker tenure	31 July 2018	4th	(Slovenia) Slaviša Stojanovič	31 July 2018
Vereya	(Bulgaria) Ivan Kolev	Mutual consent	14 August 2018	14th	(Serbia) Nebojša Miličić	14 August 2018
Dunav	(Bulgaria) Malin Orachev	Mutual consent	17 September 2018	12th	(Bulgaria) Tsvetomir Mladenov (caretaker)	17 September 2018
Septemvri	(Bulgaria) Nikolay Mitov	Mutual consent	28 September 2018	13th	(Bulgaria) Hristo Arangelov (caretaker)	28 September 2018
Dunav	(Bulgaria) Tsvetomir Mladenov	End of caretaker tenure	1 October 2018	12th	(Bulgaria) Lyudmil Kirov	1 October 2018
Ludogorets	(Brazil) Paulo Autuori	Mutual consent	9 October 2018	2nd	(Bulgaria) Antoni Zdravkov	9 October 2018
Vereya	(Serbia) Nebojša Miličić	Mutual consent	10 January 2019	14th	(Ukraine) Oleksandr Sevidov	18 January 2019
Levski Sofia	(Slovenia) Slaviša Stojanovič	Mutual consent	21 January 2019	3rd	(Bulgaria) Georgi Dermendzhiev	21 January 2019
CSKA Sofia	(England) Nestor El Maestro	Mutual consent	7 February 2019	2nd	(Bulgaria) Lyuboslav Penev	8 February 2019
Ludogorets	(Bulgaria) Antoni Zdravkov	Mutual consent	6 March 2019	1st	(Bulgaria) Stoycho Stoev	6 March 2019
Vereya	(Ukraine) Oleksandr Sevidov	Mutual consent	25 March 2019	14th	(Bulgaria) Ivan Vutov	26 March 2019
Levski Sofia	(Bulgaria) Georgi Dermendzhiev	Mutual consent	29 April 2019	3rd	(Bulgaria) Georgi Todorov (caretaker)	29 April 2019
CSKA Sofia	(Bulgaria) Lyuboslav Penev	Resigned	3 May 2019	2nd	(Bulgaria) Dobromir Mitov (caretaker)	3 May 2019

1.No license for First League.

== Regular season ==
=== League table ===
Pos	Team	Pld	W	D	L	GF	GA	GD	Pts	Qualification
1	Ludogorets Razgrad	26	19	5	2	53	14	+39	62	Qualification for the Championship round
2	CSKA Sofia	26	18	3	5	47	14	+33	57	Qualification for the Championship round
3	Levski Sofia	26	17	3	6	51	24	+27	54	Qualification for the Championship round
4	Botev Plovdiv	26	13	6	7	39	21	+18	45	Qualification for the Championship round
5	Cherno More	26	12	6	8	36	34	+2	42	Qualification for the Championship round
6	Beroe	26	12	6	8	32	23	+9	42	Qualification for the Championship round
7	Etar	26	12	4	10	30	27	+3	40	Qualification for the Relegation round
8	Lokomotiv Plovdiv	26	10	5	11	32	28	+4	35	Qualification for the Relegation round
9	Slavia Sofia	26	9	6	11	28	31	−3	33	Qualification for the Relegation round
10	Botev Vratsa	26	9	4	13	29	40	−11	31	Qualification for the Relegation round
11	Vitosha Bistritsa	26	7	4	15	17	39	−22	25	Qualification for the Relegation round
12	Septemvri Sofia	26	6	3	17	23	52	−29	21	Qualification for the Relegation round
13	Dunav Ruse	26	5	5	16	25	47	−22	20	Qualification for the Relegation round
14	Vereya	26	0	6	20	12	60	−48	6	Qualification for the Relegation round

Source: Soccerway
Rules for classification: 1) Points; 2) Head-to-head points; 3) Head-to-head goal difference; 4) Head-to-head goals scored; 5) Head-to-head away goals scored (only if two teams); 6) Goal difference; 7) Goals scored; 8) Fairplay ranking; 9) Draw.

=== Results ===
Home \ Away	BER	BPD	BVR	CHM	CSK	DUN	ETA	LEV	LPL	LUD	SEP	SLA	VER	VIT
Beroe	—	2−1	4–0	0–1	1–1	1–0	1–0	2–1	1–0	1–1	1–0	2–0	6–0	0–1
Botev Plovdiv	4−1	—	1–1	2–1	0–0	4–1	2–0	0–1	0–1	2–3	2–0	1–0	4–0	3–0
Botev Vratsa	0–1	0–1	—	2–1	0–2	1–0	2–0	0–2	0–0	1–4	4–1	1–3	3–0	1–0
Cherno More	0–0	0–0	2–1	—	2–0	3–2	1–0	1–0	2–0	1–0	1–5	1–2	4–2	1–0
CSKA Sofia	2–0	2–1	2–1	3–1	—	3–0	3–0	0–1	2–0	1–1	5–1	2–1	4–0	3–0
Dunav Ruse	1–1	1–1	3–1	1–1	0–2	—	2–4	1–2	1–0	0–2	2–0	1–1	1–0	3–0
Etar	1–1	1–0	2–1	1–1	1–3	3–0	—	1–2	2–0	1–4	2–0	3–0	1–0	1–0
Levski Sofia	1–0	4–1	1–3	2–2	1–0	3–0	2–1	—	1–1	0–2	2–0	2−0	7–0	4–1
Lokomotiv Plovdiv	4–1	0–2	4–0	0–2	0–1	4–1	0–0	1–0	—	0–1	0–2	2–4	3–0	2–1
Ludogorets Razgrad	1–0	1–1	2–0	5–1	1–0	3–1	1–0	2–1	0–1	—	6–0	2–0	2–1	3–0
Septemvri Sofia	1–0	0–2	1–2	2–1	0–3	2–1	0–2	2–2	1–3	1–4	—	1–2	1–0	0–0
Slavia Sofia	1–1	0–0	0–1	3–2	1–0	2–0	0–1	0−3	1–1	0–0	3–1	—	4–0	0–2
Vereya	0–2	1–2	2–2	0–2	0–1	1–1	0–1	3–4	2–2	0–0	0–0	0–0	—	0–1
Vitosha Bistritsa	1–2	0–2	1–1	1–1	0–2	2–1	1–1	0–2	0–3	0–2	2–1	1–0	2–0	—

Source: bulgarian-football.com
Legend: Blue = home team win; Yellow = draw; Red = away team win.
For upcoming matches, an "a" indicates there is an article about the rivalry between the two participants.

=== Positions by round ===
Team ╲ Round	1	2	3	4	5	6	7	8	9	10	11	12	13	14	15	16	17	18	19	20	21	22	23	24	25	26
Ludogorets Razgrad	5	5	8	4	3	4	3	3	3	2	2	1	1	1	1	1	1	1	1	1	1	1	1	1	1	1
CSKA Sofia	1	1	1	1	2	2	2	1	1	3	3	3	3	3	2	2	2	2	2	2	2	2	3	3	2	2
Levski Sofia	4	3	2	2	1	1	1	2	2	1	1	2	2	2	3	3	3	3	3	3	3	3	2	2	3	3
Botev Plovdiv	12	7	3	5	9	6	7	7	8	6	6	5	5	5	5	5	5	4	4	5	4	4	4	4	4	4
Cherno More	2	2	9	8	8	5	5	6	7	9	7	8	7	7	6	7	6	6	6	6	6	6	6	6	6	5
Beroe	6	10	5	3	5	3	4	4	4	4	4	4	4	4	4	4	4	5	5	4	5	5	5	5	5	6
Etar	13	8	11	11	12	13	11	9	9	10	8	9	8	8	7	6	8	7	7	7	7	7	7	7	7	7
Lokomotiv Plovdiv	14	14	12	6	5	7	6	5	5	5	5	6	6	6	8	9	9	9	9	8	9	10	10	9	9	8
Slavia Sofia	7	4	7	10	7	9	9	10	6	8	10	7	9	9	10	10	10	10	10	10	10	9	8	8	8	9
Botev Vratsa	10	13	14	13	10	11	10	11	11	11	11	11	11	10	9	8	7	8	8	9	8	8	9	10	10	10
Vitosha Bistritsa	3	6	4	7	6	8	8	8	10	7	9	10	10	12	12	11	11	11	11	11	11	11	11	11	11	11
Septemvri Sofia	8	12	6	9	11	12	13	13	13	13	13	13	13	13	13	13	13	13	13	13	12	12	12	12	12	12
Dunav Ruse	11	9	10	12	13	10	12	12	12	12	12	12	12	11	11	12	12	12	12	12	13	13	13	13	13	13
Vereya	9	11	13	14	14	14	14	14	14	14	14	14	14	14	14	14	14	14	14	14	14	14	14	14	14	14

Source: bulgarian-football.com

=== Results by round ===
Team ╲ Round	1	2	3	4	5	6	7	8	9	10	11	12	13	14	15	16	17	18	19	20	21	22	23	24	25	26
Beroe	D	D	W	W	D	W	L	W	D	D	W	W	D	W	L	W	L	L	W	W	L	W	W	L	L	L
Botev Plovdiv	L	W	W	L	L	W	D	D	L	W	W	W	W	L	W	L	W	W	W	L	W	D	W	D	D	D
Botev Vratsa	L	L	L	W	W	L	D	D	L	W	L	D	L	W	W	W	W	L	L	L	W	L	L	L	W	D
Cherno More	W	D	L	D	D	W	W	L	L	L	W	L	W	L	W	L	W	W	W	D	W	L	W	W	D	D
CSKA Sofia	W	W	W	W	L	W	D	W	W	L	W	W	D	W	W	W	L	D	W	W	L	W	L	W	W	W
Dunav Ruse	L	W	L	L	L	W	L	L	D	D	L	W	L	W	L	L	L	D	L	L	L	W	L	D	L	D
Etar	L	W	L	D	L	L	W	W	D	D	W	L	W	L	W	W	L	W	L	W	W	L	W	D	L	W
Levski Sofia	W	D	W	W	W	W	W	L	W	W	W	L	W	W	L	L	W	D	W	L	D	W	W	W	L	W
Lokomotiv Plovdiv	L	L	W	W	W	L	D	W	W	D	L	L	W	L	D	L	D	L	L	W	D	L	W	W	W	W
Ludogorets Razgrad	W	D	L	W	W	D	W	W	W	W	W	W	W	W	W	W	W	D	W	W	D	D	L	W	W	W
Septemvri Sofia	D	L	W	L	L	L	L	L	L	L	L	L	L	W	L	W	L	D	W	L	W	W	D	L	L	L
Slavia Sofia	D	W	L	L	W	D	D	D	W	L	L	W	L	L	D	L	W	D	L	W	L	W	W	L	W	L
Vereya	D	L	L	L	L	L	D	L	D	L	L	D	L	L	L	L	D	L	L	L	D	L	L	L	L	L
Vitosha Bistritsa	W	L	W	L	W	L	L	D	L	W	L	L	L	L	L	W	L	W	L	D	L	L	D	D	W	L

Source: bulgarian-football.com
W = Win; D = Draw; L = Loss

== Championship round ==
Points and goals will carry over in full from regular season.

Pos	Team	Pld	W	D	L	GF	GA	GD	Pts	Qualification	LUD	CSK	LEV	BSZ	CHM	BOT
1	Ludogorets Razgrad (C)	36	23	10	3	67	19	+48	79	Qualification for the Champions League first qualifying round	—	0–0	1–1	0–0	4–1	3–0
2	CSKA Sofia	36	24	6	6	57	17	+40	78	Qualification for the Europa League first qualifying round	0–0	—	0–0	2–0	1–0	1–0
3	Levski Sofia (O)	36	20	6	10	64	37	+27	66	Qualification for the European play-off final	0–2	0–2	—	1–2	5–1	1–1
4	Beroe	36	16	10	10	42	30	+12	58		1–1	0–1	3–1	—	2–0	1–1
5	Cherno More	36	15	7	14	44	51	−7	52		2–1	1–3	0–1	0–0	—	1–0
6	Botev Plovdiv	36	14	8	14	44	36	+8	50		0–2	2–0	1–3	0–1	0–2	—

Source: Soccerway
Legend: Blue = home team win; Yellow = draw; Red = away team win.
Rules for classification: 1) Points; 2) Head-to-head points; 3) Head-to-head goal difference; 4) Head-to-head goals scored; 5) Head-to-head away goals scored (only if two teams); 6) Goal difference; 7) Goals scored; 8) Fairplay ranking; 9) Draw.
(C) Champions; (O) Play-off winners

=== Positions by round ===
Below the positions per round are shown. As teams did not all start with an equal number of points, the initial pre-playoffs positions are also given.

Team ╲ Round	Initial	1	2	3	4	5	6	7	8	9	10
Beroe	6	5	5	6	5	5	4	4	4	4	4
Botev Plovdiv	4	4	4	4	4	4	5	5	6	6	6
Cherno More	5	6	6	5	6	6	6	6	5	5	5
CSKA Sofia	2	2	2	2	2	2	2	2	2	2	2
Levski Sofia	3	3	3	3	3	3	3	3	3	3	3
Ludogorets Razgrad	1	1	1	1	1	1	1	1	1	1	1

Source: bulgarian-football.com

== Relegation round ==
Points and goals will carry over in full from regular season.

=== Group A ===
Pos	Team	Pld	W	D	L	GF	GA	GD	Pts	Qualification or relegation	ETA	BVR	VIT	VER
1	Etar	32	15	6	11	39	31	+8	51	Qualification for the European play-off quarter-finals	—	0–0	2–0	3–0
2	Botev Vratsa	32	13	6	13	49	44	+5	45	Qualification for the European play-off quarter-finals	1–1	—	3–0	5–0
3	Vitosha Bistritsa	32	10	4	18	26	49	−23	34	Qualification for the relegation play-offs	3–0	2–5	—	2–0
4	Vereya (R, D)	32	0	6	26	13	81	−68	6	Disqualified and relegated to the Second League (Note: On 7 May 2019, Vereya were disqualified from the league for match fixing. All results from played matches involving Vereya were retained with the Bulgarian Football Union awarding Septemvri Sofia two wins by 3–0 from their scheduled relegation play-off matches with Vereya and the loser from the relegation play-off match between Dunav Ruse and Vitosha Bistritsa will now face directly the second-placed team from Second League.)	0–3	1–6	0–2	—

Source: Soccerway
Legend: Blue = home team win; Yellow = draw; Red = away team win.
Rules for classification: 1) Points; 2) Head-to-head points; 3) Head-to-head goal difference; 4) Head-to-head goals scored; 5) Head-to-head away goals scored (only if two teams); 6) Goal difference; 7) Goals scored; 8) Fairplay ranking; 9) Draw.
(D) Disqualified; (R) Relegated

=== Group B ===
Pos	Team	Pld	W	D	L	GF	GA	GD	Pts	Qualification or relegation	SLA	LPL	SEP	DUN
1	Slavia Sofia	32	10	9	13	37	42	−5	39	Qualification for the European play-off quarter-finals	—	2–2	0–0	3–5
2	Lokomotiv Plovdiv	32	10	8	14	37	37	0	38	Qualification for the Europa League second qualifying round (Note: Lokomotiv Plovdiv qualified for the Europa League second qualifying round by winning the 2018–19 Bulgarian Cup.)	1–1	—	1–2	1–1
3	Septemvri Sofia (R)	32	9	6	17	32	58	−26	33	Qualification for the relegation play-offs	3–2	1–0	—	1–1
4	Dunav Ruse	32	7	8	17	36	55	−19	29	Qualification for the relegation play-offs	0–1	2–0	2–2	—

Source: Soccerway
Legend: Blue = home team win; Yellow = draw; Red = away team win.
Rules for classification: 1) Points; 2) Head-to-head points; 3) Head-to-head goal difference; 4) Head-to-head goals scored; 5) Head-to-head away goals scored (only if two teams); 6) Goal difference; 7) Goals scored; 8) Fairplay ranking; 9) Draw.
(R) Relegated

== European play-offs ==
=== Bracket ===
Quarter-finals
Quarter-final 1
Etar	2	1	3
Lokomotiv Plovdiv	0	0	0
Quarter-final 2
Slavia Sofia	0	1	1
Botev Vratsa	0	0	0

Semi-finals
Semi-final
Etar	0	2	2
Slavia Sofia	1	0	1

Final
Final
Levski Sofia	1
Etar	0

=== European play-off quarter-finals ===
7 May 2019
17:15 EEST

Botev Vratsa	0–0	Slavia Sofia
	Report

Hristo Botev, Vratsa
Attendance: 600
Referee: Valentin Zhelezov (Burgas)
10 May 2019
20:15 EEST

Slavia Sofia	1−0 (a.e.t.)	Botev Vratsa
Chunchukov 99'	Report

Slavia, Sofia
Attendance: 370
Referee: Dragomir Draganov (Varna)

7 May 2019
19:30 EEST

Lokomotiv Plovdiv	0–2	Etar
	Report	Mladenov 24'; Sarmov 39' (pen.)

Lokomotiv, Plovdiv
Attendance: 380
Referee: Stefan Apostolov (Simitli)
10 May 2019
17:15 EEST

Etar	1−0	Lokomotiv Plovdiv
K. Stoyanov 63'	Report

Ivaylo, Veliko Tarnovo
Attendance: 370
Referee: Vladimir Valkov (Plovdiv)

=== European play-off semi-finals ===
20 May 2019
20:00 EEST

Slavia Sofia	1−0	Etar
Yomov 45+1'	Report

Slavia, Sofia
Attendance: 370
Referee: Georgi Ivanov (Sofia)
23 May 2019
20:00 EEST

Etar	2−0	Slavia Sofia
Pehlivanov 23'; Angelov 37'	Report

Ivaylo, Veliko Tarnovo
Attendance: 1,700
Referee: Nikola Popov (Sofia)

=== European play-off final ===
28 May 2019
20:00 EEST

Levski Sofia	1−0	Etar
Bojinov 72'	Report

Vivacom Arena - Georgi Asparuhov, Sofia
Attendance: 7,300
Referee: Volen Chinkov (Sofia)

== Relegation play-offs ==
=== Bracket ===
First round
Match 1
Vitosha Bistritsa	0	0	0
Dunav Ruse	0	1	1
Match 2
Septemvri Sofia	3	3	6
Vereya	0	0	0

Second round
Match 3
Dunav Ruse	0	3	3
Septemvri Sofia	1	2	3
Match 4
Vitosha Bistritsa	3	3	6
Vereya	0	0	0

Third round
Match 5
Septemvri Sofia	0
Arda	1
Match 6
Vitosha Bistritsa	3
Montana	0

Winners of matches 3, 5 and 6 will play in the top division next season

=== First round ===
8 May 2019
19:30 EEST

Dunav Ruse	0–0	Vitosha Bistritsa
	Report

Gradski, Ruse
Attendance: 1,200
Referee: Dragomir Draganov (Varna)
13 May 2019
20:00 EEST

Vitosha Bistritsa	0−1	Dunav Ruse
	Report	Isa 16'

Bistritsa Stadium, Bistritsa
Attendance: 340
Referee: Nedelcho Gadzhalov (Plovdiv)

8 May 2019
19:30 EEST

Vereya	0–3 (Awarded)	Septemvri Sofia
	Report

Trace Arena, Stara Zagora
14 May 2019
20:00 EEST

Septemvri Sofia	3–0 (Awarded)	Vereya
	Report

Vasil Levski National Stadium, Sofia

=== Second round ===
19 May 2019
20:00 EEST

Dunav Ruse	0−1	Septemvri Sofia
	Report	Mandiangu 65'

Gradski, Ruse
Attendance: 1,800
Referee: Vladimir Valkov (Plovdiv)
22 May 2019
20:00 EEST

Septemvri Sofia	2−3	Dunav Ruse
Z. Dimitrov 5'; Galchev 67'	Report	Isa 41'; Shterev 44', 73'

Vasil Levski National Stadium, Sofia
Attendance: 330
Referee: Nikolay Yordanov (Sofia)

19 May 2019
17:30 EEST

Vereya	0–3 (Awarded)	Vitosha Bistritsa
	Report

Trace Arena, Stara Zagora
22 May 2019
17:30 EEST

Vitosha Bistritsa	3–0 (Awarded)	Vereya
	Report

Bistritsa Stadium, Bistritsa

Vereya are relegated to the Second League.

=== Third round ===
29 May 2019
18:30 EEST

Septemvri Sofia	0–1 (a.e.t.)	Arda
	Report	Osman 111'

Lokomotiv, Plovdiv
Attendance: 3,700
Referee: Georgi Kabakov (Plovdiv)

Septemvri Sofia are relegated to the Second League.

30 May 2019
20:00 EEST

Vitosha Bistritsa	3−0	Montana
Dolapchiev 52'; Gargorov 90', 90+3'	Report

Slavia, Sofia
Attendance: 520
Referee: Nikolay Yordanov (Sofia)

== Season statistics ==
Round	Goal of the week	Club
1	(Bulgaria) Martin Kamburov vs Slavia	Beroe
2	(Bulgaria) Martin Raynov vs Ludogorets	Beroe
3	(Bulgaria) Martin Kamburov vs Vereya	Beroe
4	(Netherlands) Virgil Misidjan vs Vitosha Bistritsa	Ludogorets
5	(Bulgaria) Slavcho Shokolarov vs Dunav	Slavia
6	(Bulgaria) Kiril Despodov vs Vereya	CSKA Sofia
7	(France) Anthony Belmonte vs Beroe	Levski Sofia
8	(Portugal) Rúben Pinto vs Cherno More	CSKA Sofia
9	(Cape Verde) Jerson Cabral vs Vitosha Bistritsa (Bulgaria) Todor Nedelev vs Ludogorets	Levski Sofia; Botev Plovdiv
10	(Bulgaria) Yulian Nenov vs Slavia	Botev Vratsa
11	(Bulgaria) Stanislav Manolev vs Septemvri	CSKA Sofia
12	(Bulgaria) Emil Stoev vs Vereya	Botev Vratsa
13	(Bulgaria) Ivan Petkov vs Slavia	Etar
14	(Bulgaria) Stanislav Kostov vs Botev Plovdiv	Levski Sofia
15	(Democratic Republic of the Congo) Jody Lukoki vs Beroe	Ludogorets
16	(Bulgaria) Martin Kamburov vs Vereya	Beroe
17	(Bulgaria) Yanis Karabelyov vs CSKA Sofia	Slavia
18	(Bulgaria) Todor Nedelev vs Lokomotiv Plovdiv	Botev Plovdiv
19	(Bulgaria) Todor Nedelev vs Vitosha Bistritsa	Botev Plovdiv
20	(Bulgaria) Martin Kamburov vs Levski Sofia	Beroe
21	(Democratic Republic of the Congo) Aristote N'Dongala vs CSKA Sofia	Charno More
22	(Bulgaria) Emil Stoev vs CSKA Sofia	Botev Vratsa
23	(Bulgaria) Kristian Dobrev vs Vereya	Botev Plovdiv
24	(Switzerland) Davide Mariani vs Slavia	Levski Sofia
25	(Bulgaria) Dimitar Iliev vs Dunav	Lokomotiv Plovdiv
26	(Portugal) Tiago Rodrigues vs Beroe	CSKA Sofia
27	(Bulgaria) Kristian Dimitrov vs Levski Sofia	Botev Plovdiv
28	(Bulgaria) Stanislav Kostov vs Cherno More	Levski Sofia
29	(Kosovo) Suad Sahiti vs Lokomotiv Plovdiv	Septemvri
30	(Portugal) Pedro Eugénio vs Cherno More	Beroe
31	(Ghana) Carlos Ohene vs Levski Sofia	Beroe
32	(Portugal) Pedro Eugénio vs Ludogorets	Beroe
33	(Brazil) Paulinho vs Cherno More	Levski Sofia
34	(Bulgaria) Zhivko Milanov vs Ludogorets	Levski Sofia
35	(Portugal) Tiago Rodrigues vs Levski Sofia	CSKA Sofia
36	(Portugal) Rúben Brígido vs Levski Sofia	Beroe

=== Top scorers ===
As of 24 May 2019

Rank	Player	Club	Goals
1	(Bulgaria) Stanislav Kostov	Levski Sofia	24
2	(Romania) Claudiu Keșerü	Ludogorets	20
3	(Bulgaria) Martin Kamburov	Beroe	16
4	(Bulgaria) Todor Nedelev	Botev Plovdiv	14
5	(The Gambia) Ali Sowe	CSKA Sofia	11
5	(Bulgaria) Daniel Mladenov	Etar	11
5	(Switzerland) Davide Mariani	Levski Sofia	11
5	(Poland) Jakub Świerczok	Ludogorets	11
5	(Bulgaria) Tsvetelin Chunchukov	Slavia Sofia	11
5	(Bulgaria) Georgi Iliev	Cherno More	11
5	(Bulgaria) Valeri Bojinov	Levski Sofia (Note: Includes 7 goals for Botev Vratsa)	11

=== Hat-tricks ===
Player	For	Against	Result	Date
(France) Chris Gadi	Septemvri Sofia	Cherno More	5–1	4 August 2018
(Romania) Claudiu Keșerü	Ludogorets	Botev Vratsa	4–1	7 October 2018
(Romania) Claudiu Keșerü	Ludogorets	Etar	4–1	4 November 2018
(Bulgaria) Borislav Tsonev	Beroe	Vereya	6–0	25 November 2018
(Bulgaria) Todor Nedelev	Botev Plovdiv	Vitosha Bistritsa	3–0	10 December 2018
(The Gambia) Ali Sowe	CSKA Sofia	Septemvri Sofia	5–1	2 March 2019
(Bulgaria) Ivan Petkov	Etar	Vereya	3–0	21 April 2019
(Bulgaria) Emil Stoev	Botev Vratsa	Vitosha Bistritsa	5–2	22 April 2019
(Poland) Jakub Świerczok	Ludogorets	Cherno More	4–1	24 May 2019

=== Clean sheets ===
As of match(es) played on 24 May 2019

Rank	Player	Club	Clean sheets
1	(Lithuania) Vytautas Černiauskas	CSKA Sofia	20
2	(Bulgaria) Hristo Ivanov	Etar	16
3	(Slovakia) Dušan Perniš	Beroe	14
4	(Poland) Daniel Kajzer	Botev Plovdiv	13
5	(Bulgaria) Krasimir Kostov	Botev Vratsa	10
5	(Brazil) Renan	Ludogorets	10
7	(Bulgaria) Blagoy Makendzhiev	Dunav Ruse (Note: Includes 4 clean sheets for Cherno More)	8

== Attendances ==
#	Club	Average	Highest
1	Levski	5,817	14,700
2	CSKA Sofia	5,228	23,000
3	Ludogorets	2,252	7,600
4	Botev	1,946	3,100
5	Cherno More	1,936	6,000
6	Beroe	1,936	6,900
7	Etar	1,751	7,800
8	Botev Vratsa	1,349	5,200
9	Lokomotiv Plovdiv	1,126	3,900
10	Dunav	1,126	3,700
11	Slavia Sofia	541	4,300
12	Vereya	364	1,500
13	Vitosha	349	1,400
14	Septemvri	192	800

== Transfers ==
- List of Bulgarian football transfers summer 2018
- List of Bulgarian football transfers winter 2018–19
