= 2017–18 First Professional Football League (Bulgaria) =

94th season of top-tier football league in Bulgaria

First Professional Football League
- Season: 2017–18
- Dates: 14 July 2017–25 May 2018
- Champions: Ludogorets Razgrad (7th title)
- Relegated: Pirin Blagoevgrad
- Champions League: Ludogorets Razgrad
- Europa League: Slavia Sofia; CSKA Sofia; Levski Sofia
- Matches: 243
- Goals: 621 (2.56 per match)
- Top goalscorer: (Romania) Claudiu Keșerü (26)
- Best goalkeeper: Bozhidar Mitrev (19 clean sheets)
- Biggest home win: Ludogorets Razgrad 7–0 Beroe (18 April 2018)
- Biggest away win: Etar 0–6 Ludogorets Razgrad (18 March 2018)
- Highest scoring: Botev Plovdiv 2–6 CSKA Sofia (30 July 2017)
- Longest winning run: 14 games by Ludogorets Razgrad
- Longest unbeaten run: 25 games by CSKA Sofia
- Longest winless run: 31 games by Vitosha Bistritsa
- Longest losing run: 6 games by Vereya and Vitosha Bistritsa
- Highest attendance: 29,000; CSKA Sofia 0–0 Ludogorets Razgrad (5 May 2018)
- Lowest attendance: ~30; Septemvri Sofia 2–1 Cherno More (8 December 2017)
- All statistics correct as of 25 May 2018.

The 2017–18 First Professional Football League was the 94th season of the top division of the Bulgarian football league system, the 70th since a league format was adopted for the national competition of A Group as a top tier of the pyramid and also the 2nd season of the First Professional Football League, which decides the Bulgarian champion. The season is the second with a new league structure and strict financial criteria where 14 clubs play each other home and away, until the league is split up in championship and relegation playoffs. The new league structure, inspired by the ones used by the Belgian First Division A and Danish Superliga, was approved by the Bulgarian Football Union on 6 June 2016. The fixture list was released on 22 June 2017.

On 29 April 2018, four rounds before the end of the championship, Ludogorets Razgrad managed to secure the title for a seventh consecutive and overall time.

== Teams ==
A total of 14 teams would be contesting the league. Etar were promoted as champions of the 2016–17 Second League, sealing their title on the final day of the season with a 2–2 away draw against Nesebar, coupled with Septemvri Sofia's 0–2 away defeat to Oborishte. The promoted club replaced Lokomotiv Gorna Oryahovitsa, who suffered an immediate return to the second tier after elimination in the relegation play-offs by Montana.

Septemvri Sofia, runners-up of the 2016–17 Second League, won the play-off against Montana and return to the top flight after an 18-year absence, for the first time since the 1998–99 season. Montana return to the second tier after two seasons in the top flight.

Vitosha Bistritsa, who finished 3rd in the 2016–17 Second League, defeated Neftochimic in the play-off and won promotion to the top division for the first time in their history. Neftochimic spent only one season in the First League.

=== Stadia and locations ===
Note: From the 2016–17 season onwards, all participating clubs are required to have electric floodlights and adequate pitch conditions under the BFU and TV broadcaster's new licensing criteria. The following stadiums below have either obtained a license under UEFA's category ranking or fulfill the licensing criteria.

Location of teams in 2017–18 First League
Sofia 2017–18 First League football clubs

Team	Location	Stadium	Capacity (seating)
Beroe	Stara Zagora	Beroe	12,128
Botev	Plovdiv	Botev 1912 Football Complex	4,000
Cherno More	Varna	Ticha^{a}	8,250
CSKA	Sofia	Balgarska Armiya	18,495
Dunav	Ruse	Gradski, Ruse	12,400
Etar	Veliko Tarnovo	Ivaylo^{b}	18,000
Levski	Sofia	Vivacom Arena - Georgi Asparuhov	25,000
Lokomotiv	Plovdiv	Lokomotiv	13,000
Ludogorets	Razgrad	Ludogorets Arena	9,000
Pirin	Blagoevgrad	Hristo Botev	7,000
Septemvri	Sofia	Vasil Levski National Stadium^{c}	43,230
Slavia	Sofia	Slavia; Vasil Levski National Stadium^{d}	25,556; 43,230
Vereya	Stara Zagora	Trace Arena	3,500
Vitosha	Bistritsa	Bistritsa Stadium	2,500

a.Cherno More played their first home match at Kavarna Stadium in Kavarna due to ongoing renovation works at their Ticha Stadium.
b.Etar played their first two home matches at Lovech Stadium in Lovech due to ongoing renovation works at their Ivaylo Stadium.
c.Septemvri Sofia will play at the Vasil Levski National Stadium because their Dragalevtsi Stadium is not licensed for First League.
d.Slavia Sofia obtained permission from the Bulgarian Football Union to use their own stadium and will play their matches at the Vasil Levski National Stadium only when floodlights are necessary.

=== Personnel and sponsorship ===
Note: Flags indicate national team as has been defined under FIFA eligibility rules. Players and managers may hold more than one non-FIFA nationality.

Team	Manager	Captain	Kit manufacturer	Shirt sponsor	Additional
Beroe	(Bulgaria) Aleksandar Tomash	(Bulgaria) Veselin Penev	Uhlsport	—	Refan
Botev Plovdiv	(Bulgaria) Nikolay Kirov	(Bulgaria) Lachezar Baltanov	Uhlsport	Efbet	—
CSKA Sofia	(Bulgaria) Hristo Yanev (caretaker)	(Bulgaria) Bozhidar Chorbadzhiyski	adidas	Mtel	WinBet, Baristo
Cherno More	(Bulgaria) Ilian Iliev	(Bulgaria) Georgi Iliev	Uhlsport	Armeets	—
Dunav Ruse	(Bulgaria) Malin Orachev	(Bulgaria) Diyan Dimov	Joma	—	WinBet
Etar	(Bulgaria) Krasimir Balakov	(Bulgaria) Kiril Akalski	Joma	—	WinBet
Levski Sofia	(Italy) Delio Rossi	(Bulgaria) Bozhidar Mitrev	Joma	Vivacom	Strabag, Efbet, Spetema
Lokomotiv Plovdiv	(Bosnia and Herzegovina) Bruno Akrapović	(North Macedonia) Vančo Trajanov	Uhlsport	Efbet	General Broker
Ludogorets Razgrad	(Bulgaria) Dimitar Dimitrov	(Bulgaria) Svetoslav Dyakov	Umbro	bet365	Vivacom, Spetema
Pirin Blagoevgrad	(Bulgaria) Milen Radukanov	(Bulgaria) Yulian Popev	Erreà	Katarino Spa	—
Septemvri Sofia	(Bulgaria) Nikolay Mitov	(Bulgaria) Valentin Galev	Uhlsport	Efbet	—
Slavia Sofia	(Bulgaria) Zlatomir Zagorčić	(Bulgaria) Georgi Petkov	Joma	bet365	—
Vereya	(Brazil) Elias	(Brazil) Elias	Erreà	Efbet	Spetema
Vitosha Bistritsa	(Bulgaria) Kostadin Angelov	(Bulgaria) Chetin Sadula	Jumper	Efbet	

Note: Individual clubs may wear jerseys with advertising. However, only one sponsorship is permitted per jersey for official tournaments organised by UEFA in addition to that of the kit manufacturer (exceptions are made for non-profit organisations). Clubs in the domestic league can have more than one sponsorship per jersey which can feature on the front of the shirt, incorporated with the main sponsor or in place of it; or on the back, either below the squad number or on the collar area. Shorts also have space available for advertisement.

=== Managerial changes ===
Team	Outgoing manager	Manner of departure	Date of vacancy	Position in table	Incoming manager	Date of appointment
Beroe	(Bulgaria) Ferario Spasov	Mutual consent	19 May 2017	Pre-season	(Bulgaria) Aleksandar Tomash	8 June 2017
Septemvri	(Bulgaria) Hristo Arangelov	Demoted to assistant^{1}	4 June 2017	Pre-season	(Bulgaria) Dimitar Vasev	8 June 2017
Vereya	(Bulgaria) Aleksandar Tomash	Signed by Beroe	5 June 2017	Pre-season	(Bulgaria) Ilian Iliev	9 June 2017
Levski	(Bulgaria) Nikolay Mitov	Mutual consent	4 August 2017	6th	(Bulgaria) Asen Bukarev (caretaker)	4 August 2017
Levski	(Bulgaria) Asen Bukarev	End of caretaker tenure	8 August 2017	9th	(Italy) Delio Rossi	8 August 2017
Ludogorets	(Bulgaria) Georgi Dermendzhiev	Resigned	9 August 2017	2nd	(Bulgaria) Petko Petkov (caretaker)	10 August 2017
Ludogorets	(Bulgaria) Petko Petkov	End of caretaker tenure	14 August 2017	2nd	(Bulgaria) Dimitar Dimitrov	14 August 2017
Septemvri	(Bulgaria) Dimitar Vasev	Sacked	23 August 2017	13th	(Bulgaria) Nikolay Mitov	23 August 2017
Cherno More	(Bulgaria) Georgi Ivanov	Resigned	21 September 2017	6th	(Bulgaria) Emanuel Lukanov (caretaker)	21 September 2017
Dunav	(Bulgaria) Veselin Velikov	Mutual consent	16 October 2017	12th	(Bulgaria) Plamen Donev (caretaker)	16 October 2017
Lokomotiv Plovdiv	(Bulgaria) Voyn Voynov	Mutual consent	30 October 2017	8th	(Bosnia and Herzegovina) Bruno Akrapović	30 October 2017
Dunav	(Bulgaria) Plamen Donev	End of caretaker tenure	31 October 2017	13th	(Bulgaria) Malin Orachev	31 October 2017
Cherno More	(Bulgaria) Emanuel Lukanov	End of caretaker tenure	28 December 2017	7th	(Bulgaria) Ilian Iliev	28 December 2017
Vereya	(Bulgaria) Ilian Iliev	Signed by Cherno More	28 December 2017	6th	(Bulgaria) Blagomir Mitrev	2 January 2018
Etar	(Bulgaria) Stanislav Genchev	Demoted to assistant	4 January 2018	12th	(Bulgaria) Krasimir Balakov	4 January 2018
Vereya	(Bulgaria) Blagomir Mitrev	Mutual consent	1 April 2018	6th	(Brazil) Elias	2 April 2018
CSKA Sofia	(Bulgaria) Stamen Belchev	Mutual consent	1 May 2018	2nd	(Bulgaria) Hristo Yanev (caretaker)	1 May 2018

1.No license for First League.

== Regular season ==
=== League table ===
Pos	Team	Pld	W	D	L	GF	GA	GD	Pts	Qualification
1	Ludogorets Razgrad	26	21	3	2	63	13	+50	66	Qualification for the Championship round
2	CSKA Sofia	26	19	6	1	59	14	+45	63	Qualification for the Championship round
3	Levski Sofia	26	14	8	4	37	14	+23	50	Qualification for the Championship round
4	Beroe	26	12	9	5	33	24	+9	45	Qualification for the Championship round
5	Botev Plovdiv	26	11	9	6	44	29	+15	42	Qualification for the Championship round
6	Vereya	26	10	5	11	24	34	−10	35	Qualification for the Championship round
7	Slavia Sofia	26	8	8	10	34	37	−3	32	Qualification for the Relegation round
8	Septemvri Sofia	26	9	4	13	25	42	−17	31 (Note: Septemvri Sofia ahead of Lokomotiv Plovdiv on head-to-head record; Septemvri Sofia–Lokomotiv Plovdiv 3-1, Lokomotiv Plovdiv–Septemvri Sofia 1-0.)	Qualification for the Relegation round
9	Lokomotiv Plovdiv	26	8	7	11	22	37	−15	31	Qualification for the Relegation round
10	Cherno More	26	7	6	13	24	32	−8	27	Qualification for the Relegation round
11	Pirin Blagoevgrad	26	6	8	12	20	28	−8	26	Qualification for the Relegation round
12	Dunav Ruse	26	5	6	15	17	38	−21	21 (Note: Dunav Ruse ahead of Etar on head-to-head record; Dunav Ruse–Etar 0–0, Etar–Dunav Ruse 0–2.)	Qualification for the Relegation round
13	Etar	26	4	9	13	24	45	−21	21	Qualification for the Relegation round
14	Vitosha Bistritsa	26	0	8	18	12	51	−39	8	Qualification for the Relegation round

Source: Soccerway
Rules for classification: 1) Points; 2) Head-to-head points; 3) Head-to-head goal difference; 4) Head-to-head goals scored; 5) Head-to-head away goals scored (only if two teams); 6) Goal difference; 7) Goals scored; 8) Fairplay ranking; 9) Draw.

=== Results ===
Home \ Away	BSZ	BOT	CHM	CSK	DUN	ETA	LEV	LPL	LUD	PIR	SEP	SLA	VER	VIT
Beroe	—	1–1	2–0	0–3	1–1	2–1	0–0	1–2	0–1	1–1	5–1	2–0	0–0	0–0
Botev Plovdiv	1−1	—	1–2	2–6	3–0	3–0	2–1	3–0	1–3	0–1	5–0	1–1	1–0	3–0
Cherno More	1–4	0–0	—	0–1	1–0	0–0	2–3	0–1	0–1	0–1	1–4	1–1	1–2	1–0
CSKA Sofia	6–0	1–1	0–0	—	3–0	2–1	1–0	4–1	0–1	0–0	2–0	1–0	3–0	6–1
Dunav Ruse	1–1	0–0	0–1	0–2	—	0–0	0–4	2–2	0–5	0–0	0–1	0–1	2–0	3–0
Etar	1–2	1–1	1–1	2–2	0–2	—	0–1	1–2	0–6	2–1	3–3	2–1	0–1	2–0
Levski Sofia	0–0	1–0	1–0	2–2	2–0	1–1	—	1–0	0–0	3–0	2–0	4–0	1–0	2–0
Lokomotiv Plovdiv	0–2	0–0	0–3	0–1	2–1	2–0	0–0	—	0–3	1–0	1–0	1–2	1–1	3–1
Ludogorets Razgrad	2–0	2–1	3–1	1–2	2–0	4–0	2–0	0–0	—	1–1	1–0	4–1	3–1	3–0
Pirin Blagoevgrad	0–1	1–2	1–1	1–2	1–0	3–2	0–3	5–0	0–2	—	0–1	0–0	1–2	1–0
Septemvri Sofia	0–1	1–1	2–1	0–1	0–2	1–1	1–4	3–1	1–4	1–0	—	0–2	2–0	1–0
Slavia Sofia	1–4	2–3	2–0	1–1	3–0	1–2	1−1	1–1	0–4	3–1	4–1	—	0–1	4–0
Vereya	0–1	2–4	0–4	0–5	2–1	2–0	2–0	1–0	2–1	0–0	0–1	1–1	—	1–1
Vitosha Bistritsa	0–1	2–4	1–2	0–2	1–2	1–1	0–0	1–1	2–4	0–0	0–0	1–1	0–3	—

Source: bulgarian-football.com
Legend: Blue = home team win; Yellow = draw; Red = away team win.
For upcoming matches, an "a" indicates there is an article about the rivalry between the two participants.

=== Positions by round ===
Team ╲ Round	1	2	3	4	5	6	7	8	9	10	11	12	13	14	15	16	17	18	19	20	21	22	23	24	25	26
Beroe	7	8	10	5	6	5	7	5	4	5	5	7	5	5	5	4	4	4	4	4	4	4	4	4	4	4
Botev Plovdiv	12	7	12	12	12	12	11	10	10	7	7	4	4	4	4	5	5	6	6	5	5	5	5	5	5	5
Cherno More	3	1	1	1	1	1	4	4	6	6	6	9	7	6	7	7	7	7	7	7	8	8	8	9	10	10
CSKA Sofia	5	11	5	4	3	3	1	1	1	1	2	2	2	2	2	2	2	2	2	2	2	2	2	2	2	2
Dunav Ruse	1	2	7	6	9	11	12	11	11	12	12	13	13	13	13	13	13	13	13	13	13	12	12	12	12	12
Etar	11	10	13	13	8	8	8	8	8	8	9	10	12	12	11	11	12	12	12	12	12	13	13	13	13	13
Levski Sofia	9	13	6	9	7	6	3	3	3	4	3	3	3	3	3	3	3	3	3	3	3	3	3	3	3	3
Lokomotiv Plovdiv	2	3	2	8	4	7	6	7	7	10	8	6	8	8	8	9	9	9	9	9	7	7	7	7	9	9
Ludogorets Razgrad	10	6	3	2	2	2	2	2	2	2	1	1	1	1	1	1	1	1	1	1	1	1	1	1	1	1
Pirin Blagoevgrad	4	5	8	7	11	10	10	9	9	11	11	11	11	11	12	12	11	11	11	11	11	11	11	11	11	11
Septemvri Sofia	14	4	11	11	13	13	9	12	13	13	13	12	10	10	9	10	10	10	10	10	10	10	10	8	8	8
Slavia Sofia	6	9	4	10	10	9	13	13	12	9	10	8	9	9	10	8	8	8	8	8	9	9	9	10	7	7
Vereya	8	14	9	3	5	4	5	6	5	3	4	5	6	7	6	6	6	5	5	6	6	6	6	6	6	6
Vitosha Bistritsa	13	12	14	14	14	14	14	14	14	14	14	14	14	14	14	14	14	14	14	14	14	14	14	14	14	14

Source: bulgarian-football.com

=== Results by round ===
Team ╲ Round	1	2	3	4	5	6	7	8	9	10	11	12	13	14	15	16	17	18	19	20	21	22	23	24	25	26
Beroe	D	D	D	W	D	W	L	W	W	D	L	L	W	W	D	W	W	D	W	L	W	W	D	L	W	D
Botev Plovdiv	L	W	L	W	D	L	D	W	L	W	W	W	D	W	D	D	D	D	D	W	L	L	D	W	W	W
Cherno More	W	W	W	D	D	W	L	L	L	D	L	L	W	W	L	W	L	L	D	L	L	D	D	L	L	L
CSKA Sofia	D	L	W	W	W	W	W	W	W	W	D	D	D	W	W	D	W	W	W	W	W	D	W	W	W	W
Dunav Ruse	W	D	L	D	L	L	L	W	L	L	D	L	D	L	D	L	W	L	L	D	W	W	L	L	L	L
Etar	L	D	L	D	W	W	D	D	L	D	D	L	L	L	W	L	L	L	W	L	D	L	D	L	D	L
Levski Sofia	D	D	W	L	W	W	W	L	W	D	W	W	D	L	W	D	W	W	W	D	W	W	D	W	D	L
Lokomotiv Plovdiv	W	D	D	L	W	L	W	L	L	L	W	W	L	W	L	L	L	D	D	D	W	D	D	L	L	W
Ludogorets Razgrad	D	W	D	W	W	W	D	W	W	W	W	W	W	W	L	W	W	L	W	W	W	W	W	W	W	W
Pirin Blagoevgrad	W	L	D	D	L	L	D	W	D	L	D	D	D	L	L	L	W	W	L	L	L	W	D	W	L	L
Septemvri Sofia	L	W	L	L	L	L	W	D	L	L	L	W	W	W	W	L	D	L	L	W	D	L	L	W	D	W
Slavia Sofia	D	L	W	L	D	L	L	L	W	W	D	W	D	L	D	W	L	W	L	D	L	D	D	L	W	W
Vereya	D	L	W	W	L	W	W	L	W	W	D	L	L	L	W	W	L	W	D	D	L	L	D	W	L	L
Vitosha Bistritsa	L	D	L	L	L	L	L	L	D	L	L	L	L	L	L	D	L	D	L	D	L	L	D	L	D	D

Source: bulgarian-football.com
W = Win; D = Draw; L = Loss

== Championship round ==
Points and goals will carry over in full from regular season.

Pos	Team	Pld	W	D	L	GF	GA	GD	Pts	Qualification	LUD	CSK	LEV	BSZ	BOT	VER
1	Ludogorets Razgrad (C)	36	27	7	2	91	22	+69	88	Qualification for the Champions League first qualifying round	—	3–2	2–2	7–0	2–2	5–0
2	CSKA Sofia	36	24	9	3	80	26	+54	81	Qualification for the Europa League first qualifying round	0–0	—	2–2	1–0	4–1	5–1
3	Levski Sofia (O)	36	18	10	8	55	27	+28	64	Qualification for the European play-off final	0–1	2–3	—	1–2	3–2	2–0
4	Beroe	36	16	11	9	45	43	+2	59		1–1	1–1	0–4	—	3−2	1–0
5	Botev Plovdiv	36	15	11	10	62	49	+13	56		2–4	2–1	1–0	2–1	—	2–0
6	Vereya	36	10	6	20	27	61	−34	36		0–3	0–2	0–2	0–3	2–2	—

Source: Soccerway
Legend: Blue = home team win; Yellow = draw; Red = away team win.
Rules for classification: 1) Points; 2) Head-to-head points; 3) Head-to-head goal difference; 4) Head-to-head goals scored; 5) Head-to-head away goals scored (only if two teams); 6) Goal difference; 7) Goals scored; 8) Fairplay ranking; 9) Draw.
(C) Champions; (O) Play-off winners

=== Positions by round ===
Below the positions per round are shown. As teams did not all start with an equal number of points, the initial pre-playoffs positions are also given.

Team ╲ Round	Initial	1	2	3	4	5	6	7	8	9	10
Beroe	4	4	3	3	3	3	4	4	4	4	4
Botev Plovdiv	5	5	5	5	5	5	5	5	5	5	5
CSKA Sofia	2	2	2	2	2	2	2	2	2	2	2
Levski Sofia	3	3	4	4	4	4	3	3	3	3	3
Ludogorets Razgrad	1	1	1	1	1	1	1	1	1	1	1
Vereya	6	6	6	6	6	6	6	6	6	6	6

Source: bulgarian-football.com

== Relegation round ==
Points and goals will carry over in full from regular season.

=== Group A ===
Pos	Team	Pld	W	D	L	GF	GA	GD	Pts	Qualification or relegation	SLA	CHM	PIR	VIT
1	Slavia Sofia	32	11	10	11	44	44	0	43	Qualification for the Europa League first qualifying round (Note: Slavia Sofia qualified for the Europa League first qualifying round by winning the 2017–18 Bulgarian Cup.)	—	1–1	2–1	0–0
2	Cherno More	32	11	7	14	33	35	−2	40	Qualification for the European play-off quarter-finals	2–0	—	2–1	2–0
3	Pirin Blagoevgrad (R)	32	7	9	16	29	42	−13	30	Qualification for the relegation play-offs	2–5	0–2	—	2–2
4	Vitosha Bistritsa (O)	32	1	10	21	17	60	−43	13	Qualification for the relegation play-offs	1–2	1–0	1–3	—

Source: Soccerway
Legend: Blue = home team win; Yellow = draw; Red = away team win.
Rules for classification: 1) Points; 2) Head-to-head points; 3) Head-to-head goal difference; 4) Head-to-head goals scored; 5) Head-to-head away goals scored (only if two teams); 6) Goal difference; 7) Goals scored; 8) Fairplay ranking; 9) Draw.
(O) Play-off winners; (R) Relegated

=== Group B ===
Pos	Team	Pld	W	D	L	GF	GA	GD	Pts	Qualification or relegation	SEP	LPL	DUN	ETA
1	Septemvri Sofia	32	12	5	15	32	48	−16	41	Qualification for the European play-off quarter-finals	—	0–0	0–2	1–0
2	Lokomotiv Plovdiv	32	9	10	13	26	43	−17	37	Qualification for the European play-off quarter-finals	0–2	—	2–2	1–0
3	Dunav Ruse (O)	32	8	7	17	24	44	−20	31	Qualification for the relegation play-offs	0–2	1–0	—	1–0
4	Etar (O)	32	6	10	16	31	52	−21	28	Qualification for the relegation play-offs	4–2	1–1	2–1	—

Source: Soccerway
Legend: Blue = home team win; Yellow = draw; Red = away team win.
Rules for classification: 1) Points; 2) Head-to-head points; 3) Head-to-head goal difference; 4) Head-to-head goals scored; 5) Head-to-head away goals scored (only if two teams); 6) Goal difference; 7) Goals scored; 8) Fairplay ranking; 9) Draw.
(O) Play-off winners

== European play-offs ==
=== Bracket ===
Quarter-finals
Quarter-final 1
Cherno More	2	2	4
Septemvri Sofia	1	1	2
Quarter-final 2
Lokomotiv Plovdiv	3	3	6
Slavia Sofia	1	0	1

Semi-finals
Semi-final
Cherno More	2	2	4
Lokomotiv Plovdiv	1	2	3

Final
Final
Levski Sofia	4
Cherno More	1

=== European play-off quarter-finals ===
5 May 2018
17:00 EEST

Cherno More	2−1	Septemvri Sofia
Iliev 45+1', 77' (pen.)	Report	Toshev 57'

Ticha, Varna
Attendance: 770
Referee: Volen Chinkov (Sofia)
11 May 2018
17:30 EEST

Septemvri Sofia	1−2	Cherno More
Toshev 85'	Report	Fennouche 39', 43'

Vasil Levski, Sofia
Attendance: 200
Referee: Stefan Apostolov (Simitli)

4 May 2018
17:30 EEST

Lokomotiv Plovdiv	3−1	Slavia Sofia
Bakalov 17'; Aralica 56'; Marchev 67'	Report	Yomov 2'

Lokomotiv, Plovdiv
Attendance: 790
Referee: Ivaylo Stoyanov (Petrich)
13 May 2018
19:00 EEST

Slavia Sofia	0−3	Lokomotiv Plovdiv
	Report	Umarbayev 26'; Angelov 82'; Aralica 90'

Vasil Levski, Sofia
Attendance: 350
Referee: Stanislav Todorov (Shumen)

=== European play-off semi-finals ===
16 May 2018
19:00 EEST

Cherno More	2−1	Lokomotiv Plovdiv
Zehirov 61'; Fennouche 64'	Report	Mihaljević 85'

Ticha, Varna
Attendance: 1,250
Referee: Nikolay Yordanov (Sofia)
19 May 2018
19:45 EEST

Lokomotiv Plovdiv	2−2 (a.e.t.)	Cherno More
Mihaljević 12', 42'	Report	Kuzma 69'; Dimov 103'

Lokomotiv, Plovdiv
Attendance: 970
Referee: Nikola Popov (Sofia)

=== European play-off final ===
24 May 2018
20:30 EEST

Levski Sofia	4−1	Cherno More
Obertan 24'; Buș 39'; Panayotov 74'; Goranov 83' (pen.)	Report	Fennouche 56'

Vivacom Arena - Georgi Asparuhov, Sofia
Attendance: 4,030
Referee: Georgi Kabakov (Plovdiv)

== Relegation play-offs ==
=== Bracket ===
First round
Match 1
Etar	2	1	3
Pirin Blagoevgrad	1	0	1
Match 2
Vitosha Bistritsa	0	1	1
Dunav Ruse	1	3	4

Second round
Match 3
Etar	2	2	4
Dunav Ruse	0	1	1
Match 4
Vitosha Bistritsa	0	2	2
Pirin Blagoevgrad	1	1	2

Third round
Match 5
Dunav Ruse	2
Tsarsko Selo	1
Match 6
Vitosha Bistritsa	2 (4)
Lokomotiv Sofia	2 (2)

Winners of matches 3, 5 and 6 will play in the top division next season

=== First round ===
6 May 2018
17:30 EEST

Vitosha Bistritsa	0–1	Dunav Ruse
	Report	Karagaren 48'

Bistritsa Stadium, Bistritsa
Attendance: 290
Referee: Stanislav Todorov (Shumen)
14 May 2018
17:30 EEST

Dunav Ruse	3–1	Vitosha Bistritsa
Karagaren 22', 30'; Shopov 40'	Report	Hristov 31' (pen.)

Gradski, Ruse
Attendance: 1,500
Referee: Ivaylo Stoyanov (Petrich)

7 May 2018
20:00 EEST

Etar	2–1	Pirin Blagoevgrad
Pochanski 26'; Badará 32'	Report	Kirilov 72'

Ivaylo, Veliko Tarnovo
Attendance: 1,500
Referee: Georgi Kabakov (Plovdiv)
14 May 2018
20:30 EEST

Pirin Blagoevgrad	0–1	Etar
	Report	Manneh 52'

Hristo Botev, Blagoevgrad
Attendance: 1,680
Referee: Nikola Popov (Sofia)

=== Second round ===
17 May 2018
20:00 EEST

Etar	2–0	Dunav Ruse
Mladenov 54'; Pashov 76'	Report

Ivaylo, Veliko Tarnovo
Attendance: 1,450
Referee: Vladimir Valkov (Plovdiv)
21 May 2018
20:30 EEST

Dunav Ruse	1–2	Etar
N'Diaye 57'	Report	Batrović 68' (pen.); Stoyanov 90+2'

Gradski, Ruse
Attendance: 2,500
Referee: Stefan Apostolov (Simitli)

17 May 2018
17:30 EEST

Vitosha Bistritsa	0–1	Pirin Blagoevgrad
	Report	Popev 57'

Bistritsa Stadium, Bistritsa
Attendance: 180
Referee: Angel Bayaltsaliev (Sofia)
21 May 2018
17:30 EEST

Pirin Blagoevgrad	1−2	Vitosha Bistritsa
Nichev 66'	Report	Mutafchiyski 60'; Dolapchiev 63'

Hristo Botev, Blagoevgrad
Attendance: 480
Referee: Stanislav Todorov (Shumen)

Pirin Blagoevgrad are relegated to the Second League.

=== Third round ===
24 May 2018
17:30 EEST

Dunav Ruse	2−1	Tsarsko Selo
Karagaren 59'; N'Diaye 75'	Report	Minchev 82'

Botev 1912 Football Complex, Plovdiv
Attendance: 410
Referee: Nikolay Yordanov (Sofia)
25 May 2018
20:00 EEST

Vitosha Bistritsa	2−2 (a.e.t.)	Lokomotiv Sofia
Kutev 63'; Hristov 120+5'	Report	I. Dimitrov 4'; Z. Dimitrov 111'
Penalties
Kochilov (penalty scored); Angelov (penalty scored); Kotev (penalty scored); Hristov (penalty scored)	4–2	(penalty scored) Stankev; (penalty missed) Z. Dimitrov; (penalty missed) Semerdzhiev; (penalty scored) Goranov

Lokomotiv, Plovdiv
Attendance: 550
Referee: Nikola Popov (Sofia)

== Season statistics ==
Round	Goal of the week	Club	Save of the week	Club
1	(Bulgaria) Dani Kiki vs Etar	Lokomotiv Plovdiv	(Bulgaria) Mihail Ivanov vs Cherno More	Vitosha Bistritsa
2	(Bulgaria) Vladislav Uzunov vs Botev Plovdiv	Slavia	(Slovakia) Dušan Perniš vs Dunav	Beroe
3	(Portugal) Tiago Rodrigues vs Botev Plovdiv	CSKA Sofia	(Bulgaria) Hristiyan Vasilev vs Levski Sofia	Vitosha Bistritsa
4	(Ghana) Carlos Ohene vs Slavia	Beroe	(Slovakia) Dušan Perniš vs Slavia	Beroe
5	(Czech Republic) David Jablonský vs Dunav	Levski Sofia	(Bulgaria) Stanislav Antonov vs Levski Sofia	Dunav
6	(Democratic Republic of the Congo) Junior Mapuku vs Pirin Blagoevgrad	Levski Sofia	(Argentina) Jorge Broun vs Dunav	Ludogorets
7	(Bulgaria) Dimo Bakalov vs Dunav	Lokomotiv Plovdiv	(Slovakia) Dušan Perniš vs CSKA Sofia	Beroe
8	(Netherlands) Virgil Misidjan vs Slavia	Ludogorets	(Bulgaria) Stanislav Antonov vs Vitosha Bistritsa	Dunav
9	(France) Gabriel Obertan vs Septemvri	Levski Sofia	(Ukraine) Yevhen Borovyk vs CSKA Sofia	Cherno More
10	(Portugal) Tiago Rodrigues vs Dunav	CSKA Sofia	(Slovakia) Dušan Perniš vs Levski Sofia	Beroe
11	(Senegal) Alioune Badará vs CSKA Sofia	Etar	(Bulgaria) Emil Mihaylov vs Levski Sofia	Cherno More
12	(Portugal) Pedro Eugénio vs Lokomotiv Plovdiv	Beroe	(Bulgaria) Blagoy Makendzhiev vs CSKA Sofia	Pirin Blagoevgrad
13	(Slovakia) Roman Procházka vs CSKA Sofia	Levski Sofia	(Argentina) Jorge Broun vs Etar	Ludogorets
14	(Bulgaria) Martin Kamburov vs Vereya	Beroe	(Bulgaria) Stanislav Antonov vs Septemvri	Dunav
15	(Spain) Jordi Gómez vs Lokomotiv Plovdiv	Levski Sofia	(Bulgaria) Georgi Argilashki vs Cherno More	Vereya
16	(Bulgaria) Martin Kamburov vs Pirin Blagoevgrad	Beroe	(Bulgaria) Georgi Argilashki vs Etar	Vereya
17	(Ghana) Carlos Ohene vs Slavia	Beroe	(Bulgaria) Georgi Argilashki vs Levski Sofia	Vereya
18	(Bulgaria) Ivan Minchev vs Cherno More	Slavia	(Slovakia) Dušan Perniš vs Botev Plovdiv	Beroe
19	(Democratic Republic of the Congo) Junior Mapuku vs Pirin Blagoevgrad	Levski Sofia	(Slovakia) Dušan Perniš vs Septemvri	Beroe
20	(Bulgaria) Serkan Yusein vs Etar	Botev Plovdiv		
21	(Portugal) Pedro Eugénio vs Cherno More	Beroe	(Bulgaria) Daniel Naumov vs CSKA Sofia	Vereya
22	(France) Gabriel Obertan vs Septemvri	Levski Sofia	(Bulgaria) Blagoy Makendzhiev vs CSKA Sofia	Pirin Blagoevgrad
23	(Bulgaria) Daniel Peev vs Slavia	Vitosha Bistritsa	(Bulgaria) Valentin Galev vs Ludogorets	Septemvri
24	(The Gambia) Alasana Manneh vs CSKA Sofia	Etar	(Bulgaria) Nikolay Krastev vs Cherno More	Levski Sofia
25	(Brazil) João Paulo vs Vereya	Botev Plovdiv	(Bulgaria) Ilko Pirgov vs Beroe	Lokomotiv Plovdiv
26	(Bulgaria) Todor Nedelev vs Dunav	Botev Plovdiv	(Bulgaria) Georgi Argilashki vs Vitosha Bistritsa	Vereya
27	(Portugal) Pedro Eugénio vs Levski Sofia	Beroe	(Slovakia) Dušan Perniš vs Levski Sofia	Beroe
28	(Bulgaria) Martin Kamburov vs Vereya	Beroe	(Brazil) Renan vs CSKA Sofia	Ludogorets
29	(Romania) Claudiu Keșerü vs Levski Sofia	Ludogorets	(Bulgaria) Bozhidar Mitrev vs Ludogorets	Levski Sofia
30	(Bulgaria) Ivan Goranov vs CSKA Sofia	Levski Sofia	(Bulgaria) Bozhidar Mitrev vs CSKA Sofia	Levski Sofia
31	(Bulgaria) Georgi Bozhilov vs Slavia	Cherno More	(Bulgaria) Martin Lukov vs Etar	Dunav
32	(Spain) Jordi Gómez vs Beroe	Levski Sofia	(Poland) Daniel Kajzer vs CSKA Sofia	Botev Plovdiv
33	(Brazil) Paulinho vs Botev Plovdiv	Levski Sofia	(Bulgaria) Nikolay Krastev vs Botev Plovdiv	Levski Sofia
34	(Algeria) Mehdi Fennouche vs Septemvri	Cherno More	(Bulgaria) Georgi Argilashki vs Botev Plovdiv	Beroe
35	(Bulgaria) Atanas Zehirov vs Lokomotiv Plovdiv	Cherno More	(Bulgaria) Bozhidar Mitrev vs CSKA Sofia	Levski Sofia
36	(Brazil) Paulinho vs Vereya	Levski Sofia		

=== Top scorers ===
As of match(es) played on 25 May 2018

Rank	Player	Club	Goals
1	(Romania) Claudiu Keșerü	Ludogorets Razgrad	26
2	(Brazil) Fernando Karanga	CSKA Sofia	23
3	(Portugal) Pedro Eugénio	Beroe	16
4	(Bulgaria) Steven Petkov	Botev Plovdiv	15
5	(Bulgaria) Martin Kamburov	Beroe Stara Zagora	14
6	(Netherlands) Virgil Misidjan	Ludogorets Razgrad	12
7	(Bulgaria) Ivaylo Dimitrov	Slavia Sofia	11
7	(Bulgaria) Martin Toshev	Septemvri Sofia	11
9	(Senegal) Alioune Badará	Etar	10
9	(Brazil) João Paulo	Botev Plovdiv (Note: Including 1 goal for Ludogorets Razgrad.)	10
11	(Brazil) Fernando Viana	Botev Plovdiv	9
11	(Bulgaria) Marcelinho	Ludogorets Razgrad	9
11	(Bulgaria) Todor Nedelev	Botev Plovdiv	9
11	(Portugal) Tiago Rodrigues	CSKA Sofia	9
11	(Bulgaria) Galin Ivanov	Slavia Sofia	9
11	(Czech Republic) David Jablonský	Levski Sofia	9
11	(Bulgaria) Dimo Bakalov	Lokomotiv Plovdiv	9
11	(Bulgaria) Stanislav Kostov	Levski Sofia (Note: Including 6 goals for Pirin Blagoevgrad.)	9
19	(Bulgaria) Vasil Shopov	Dunav Ruse	8
19	(Bulgaria) Kiril Despodov	CSKA Sofia	8
19	(Brazil) Paulinho	Levski Sofia	8
22	(Bulgaria) Miroslav Budinov	Septemvri Sofia (Note: Including 6 goals for Dunav Ruse.)	7
22	(Romania) Sergiu Buș	Levski Sofia	7
22	(Bulgaria) Boris Galchev	Septemvri Sofia	7
22	(France) Chris Gadi	Septemvri Sofia	7
22	(Democratic Republic of the Congo) Jody Lukoki	Ludogorets Razgrad	7
22	(Poland) Jakub Świerczok	Ludogorets Razgrad	7
22	(Brazil) Wanderson	Ludogorets Razgrad	7
29	(Democratic Republic of the Congo) Junior Mapuku	Levski Sofia	6
29	(Bulgaria) Mariyan Ognyanov	Cherno More	6
29	(Bulgaria) Ivan Minchev	Slavia Sofia	6
29	(Bulgaria) Radoslav Vasilev	Cherno More	6
29	(Bulgaria) Ismail Isa	Dunav Ruse (Note: Including 2 goals for Vereya.)	6
29	(Bulgaria) Georgi Iliev	Cherno More	6
29	(Algeria) Mehdi Fennouche	Cherno More (Note: Including 3 goals for Vereya.)	6

=== Hat-tricks ===
Player	For	Against	Result	Date
(Brazil) Fernando Karanga	CSKA Sofia	Botev Plovdiv	6–2	30 July 2017
(Democratic Republic of the Congo) Junior Mapuku	Levski Sofia	Pirin Blagoevgrad	3–0	18 August 2017
(Brazil) Fernando Viana^{4}	Botev Plovdiv	Septemvri Sofia	5–0	12 October 2017
(Romania) Claudiu Keșerü	Ludogorets Razgrad	Etar	4–0	23 October 2017
(Brazil) Fernando Karanga	CSKA Sofia	Beroe	6–0	10 December 2017
(Portugal) Pedro Eugénio	Beroe	Cherno More	4–1	17 February 2018
(Romania) Claudiu Keșerü	Ludogorets Razgrad	Beroe	7–0	18 April 2018

== Clean sheets ==
As of match(es) played on 25 May 2018

Rank	Player	Club	Clean sheets
1	(Bulgaria) Bozhidar Mitrev	Levski Sofia	19
2	(Lithuania) Vytautas Černiauskas	CSKA Sofia	17
3	(Argentina) Jorge Broun	Ludogorets Razgrad	12
4	(Slovakia) Dušan Perniš	Beroe	11
5	(Bulgaria) Blagoy Makendzhiev	Cherno More (Note: Including 7 clean sheets for Pirin Blagoevgrad.)	10
6	(Bulgaria) Ivan Čvorović	Botev Plovdiv	9
6	(Brazil) Renan	Ludogorets Razgrad	9
8	(Bulgaria) Yanko Georgiev	Septemvri Sofia	8
8	(Bulgaria) Ilko Pirgov	Lokomotiv Plovdiv	8
10	(Bulgaria) Georgi Argilashki	Beroe (Note: Including 6 clean sheets for Vereya.)	7
11	(Bulgaria) Stanislav Antonov	Dunav Ruse	6
11	(Bulgaria) Emil Mihaylov	Cherno More	6
13	(Bulgaria) Martin Lukov	Dunav Ruse	5
13	(Greece) Antonis Stergiakis	Slavia Sofia	5
13	(Bulgaria) Hristo Ivanov	Etar	5
16	(Bulgaria) Nikolay Georgiev	Vitosha Bistritsa	3
16	(Bulgaria) Valentin Galev	Septemvri Sofia	3
16	(Bulgaria) Georgi Georgiev	Pirin Blagoevgrad	3
19	(Bulgaria) Georgi Petkov	Slavia Sofia	2
19	(Croatia) Antoni Milina	Lokomotiv Plovdiv	2
19	(Poland) Daniel Kajzer	Botev Plovdiv	2
22	(Ukraine) Yevhen Borovyk	Cherno More	1
22	(Bulgaria) Ivan Dyulgerov	Cherno More	1
22	(Bulgaria) Mihail Ivanov	Vitosha Bistritsa	1
22	(Bulgaria) Petar Ivanov	Levski Sofia	1
22	(Bulgaria) Aleksandar Lyubenov	Levski Sofia	1
22	(Bulgaria) Nikolay Radev	Vitosha Bistritsa	1
22	(Bulgaria) Hristiyan Vasilev	Vitosha Bistritsa	1

== Transfers ==
- List of Bulgarian football transfers summer 2017
- List of Bulgarian football transfers winter 2017–18

== Attendances ==
#	Club	Average	Highest
1	CSKA Sofia	5,019	29,000
2	Levski	4,483	25,107
3	Beroe	2,189	7,200
4	Etar	2,124	9,800
5	Ludogorets	1,918	7,400
6	Botev	1,829	3,300
7	Cherno More	1,706	6,500
8	Dunav	1,437	3,500
9	Pirin	1,053	6,100
10	Lokomotiv Plovdiv	989	3,600
11	Vereya	643	3,200
12	Slavia Sofia	460	3,800
13	Vitosha	307	1,000
14	Septemvri	232	1,400
