= Georgi Argilashki =

Bulgarian footballer

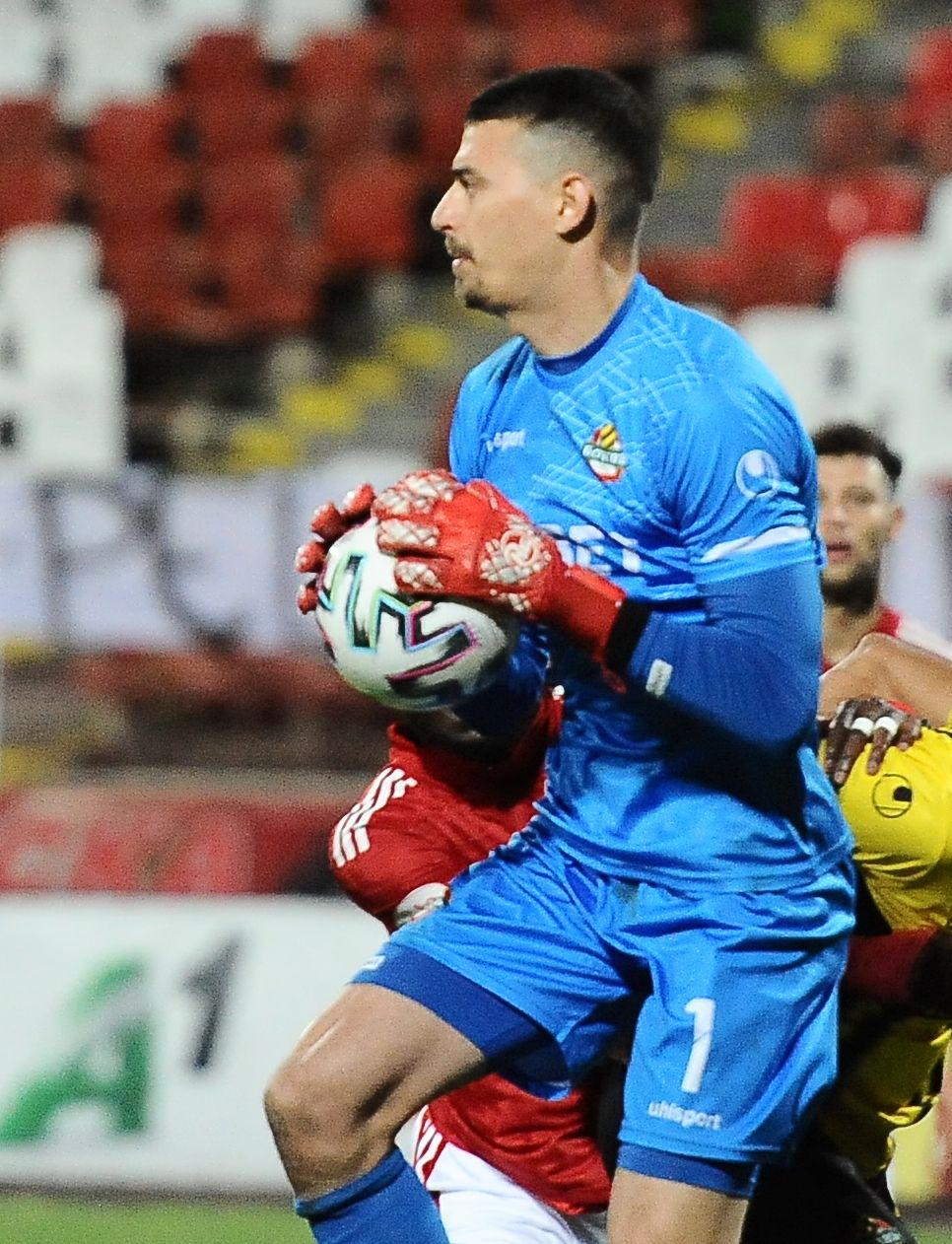

Personal information
- Full name: Georgi Rangelov Argilashki
- Date of birth: 13 June 1991 (age 35)
- Place of birth: Plovdiv, Bulgaria
- Height: 1.90 m (6 ft 3 in)
- Position: Goalkeeper

Team information
- Current team: Chernomorets Burgas
- Number: 15

Youth career
- 1999–2010: Maritsa Plovdiv

Senior career*
Years	Team	Apps	(Gls)
2011	Brestnik 1948	15	(0)
2011–2017	Ludogorets Razgrad	6	(0)
2013	→ Pirin Razlog (loan)	7	(0)
2015–2016	→ Ludogorets II	18	(0)
2016	→ Pirin Blagoevgrad (loan)	5	(0)
2017	→ Vereya (loan)	2	(0)
2017	Vereya	17	(0)
2018–2019	Beroe	7	(0)
2019–2023	Botev Plovdiv	64	(0)
2023–2026	Dobrudzha	54	(0)
2026–	Chernomorets Burgas	11	(0)

International career
2011	South-West Bulgaria	3	(0)
- * Club domestic league appearances and goals as of 26 July 2026

Georgi Argilashki (Bulgarian: Георги Аргилашки; born 13 June 1991) is a Bulgarian professional footballer who plays as a goalkeeper for Chernomorets Burgas.

== Career ==
=== Ludogorets Razgrad ===
In December 2011, Argilashki signed a long-term contract with Ludogorets Razgrad. He made his A Group debut in a 1–1 home draw against Beroe Stara Zagora on 31 May 2015. He mainly served as an understudy to Vladislav Stoyanov and Milan Borjan during the 2015/2016 season.

In the summer of 2016 he was sent on loan to Pirin Blagoevgrad until end of the season. However, on 1 March 2017 his loan was ended and he was sent again on loan in Vereya until rest of the season. On 20 June 2017, his contract with Ludogorets Razgrad was terminated by mutual consent.

== Statistics ==
=== Club ===
As of 5 March 2018

Appearances and goals by club, season and competition
Club	Season	League			Cup		Europe		Total	
Club	Season	Division	Apps	Goals	Apps	Goals	Apps	Goals	Apps	Goals
Brestnik 1948	2011–12	V Group	15	0	0	0	–		15	0
Ludogorets Razgrad	2011–12	A Group	0	0	0	0	0	0	0	0
Ludogorets Razgrad	2012–13	A Group	0	0	0	0	0	0	0	0
Ludogorets Razgrad	2013–14	A Group	0	0	2	0	0	0	2	0
Ludogorets Razgrad	2014–15	A Group	1	0	0	0	0	0	1	0
Ludogorets Razgrad	2015–16	A Group	5	0	1	0	0	0	6	0
Ludogorets Razgrad	Total		6	0	3	0	0	0	9	0
Pirin Razlog (loan)	2012–13	B Group	7	0	0	0	–		7	0
Ludogorets Razgrad II	2015–16	B Group	18	0	–		–		18	0
Pirin Blagoevgrad (loan)	2016–17	Parva Liga	5	0	1	0	–		6	0
Vereya (loan)	2016–17	Parva Liga	2	0	1	0	–		3	0
Vereya	2017–18	Parva Liga	17	0	0	0	–		17	0
Beroe Stara Zagora	2017–18	Parva Liga	0	0	0	0	–		0	0
Career Total			70	0	5	0	0	0	75	0
