= Lachezar Kotev =

Bulgarian footballer

Personal information
- Full name: Lachezar Hristov Kotev
- Date of birth: 5 January 1998 (age 28)
- Place of birth: Sofia, Bulgaria
- Height: 1.83 m (6 ft 0 in)
- Position: Midfielder

Team information
- Current team: Arda Kardzhali
- Number: 80

Youth career
- Levski Sofia
- Septemvri Sofia

Senior career*
| Years | Team | Apps | (Gls) |
| 2015–2016 | Septemvri Sofia | 21 | (3) |
| 2016–2020 | Vitosha Bistritsa | 77 | (0) |
| 2017 | → Oborishte (loan) | 10 | (0) |
| 2020–2023 | Arda Kardzhali | 64 | (5) |
| 2023–2024 | Khimki | 2 | (0) |
| 2023–2024 | → Arda Kardzhali (loan) | 36 | (1) |
| 2024– | Arda Kardzhali | 63 | (1) |

International career^{‡}
| 2019–2020 | Bulgaria U21 | 10 | (2) |
- * Club domestic league appearances and goals as of 11 June 2026 ‡ National team caps and goals as of 10 October 2020

Lachezar Hristov Kotev (Bulgarian: Лъчезар Христов Котев; born 5 January 1998) is a Bulgarian professional footballer who plays as a midfielder for First League club Arda Kardzhali.

== Club career ==
On 11 February 2023, Kotev signed a two-and-a-half-year contract with Russian Premier League club Khimki.

Khimki were relegated to the Russian First League at the end of the 2022–23 season, and First League has much stricter restrictions than RPL on the number of foreign players allowed on the squad. On 28 June 2023, Kotev returned to Arda Kardzhali on a season-long loan.

On 20 August 2024, Kotev returned to Arda Kardzhali on a permanent basis and signed a three-year contract.

== International career ==
=== Youth levels ===
In August 2018 he was called up for the Bulgaria U21 team for the 2019 UEFA European Under-21 Championship qualification matches against France U21 and Montenegro U21 to be held on 7 and 11 September 2018.

=== Senior level ===
Kotev received his first call up for the Bulgaria national team on 14 May 2021 for the friendly games against Slovakia, Russia and France between 1 and 8 June.

== Career statistics ==
=== Club ===
As of 24 December 2020

| Club performance | | | League | | Cup | | Continental | | Other | | Total | |
| Club | League | Season | Apps | Goals | Apps | Goals | Apps | Goals | Apps | Goals | Apps | Goals |
| Bulgaria | | | League | | Bulgarian Cup | | Europe | | Other | | Total | |
|---|---|---|---|---|---|---|---|---|---|---|---|---|
| Septemvri Sofia | V Group | 2015–16 | 21 | 3 | 0 | 0 | – | | – | | 21 | 3 |
| Vitosha Bistritsa | Second League | 2016–17 | 14 | 0 | 0 | 0 | – | | 0 | 0 | 14 | 0 |
| Vitosha Bistritsa | First League | 2017–18 | 11 | 0 | 0 | 0 | – | | 5 (Note: Relegation Play-offs) | 0 | 16 | 0 |
| Vitosha Bistritsa | First League | 2018–19 | 29 | 0 | 1 | 0 | – | | 3 (Note: Relegation Play-offs) | 0 | 33 | 0 |
| Vitosha Bistritsa | First League | 2019–20 | 23 | 0 | 2 | 0 | – | | 0 | 0 | 25 | 0 |
| Vitosha Bistritsa | Total | | 77 | 0 | 3 | 0 | 0 | 0 | 8 | 0 | 88 | 0 |
| Oborishte (loan) | Second League | 2017–18 | 10 | 0 | 0 | 0 | – | | – | | 10 | 0 |
| Arda Kardzhali | First League | 2020–21 | 12 | 0 | 1 | 0 | – | | – | | 13 | 0 |
| Career statistics | | | 120 | 3 | 4 | 0 | 0 | 0 | 8 | 0 | 132 | 3 |
