= Blagoy Makendzhiev =

Bulgarian footballer (born 1988)

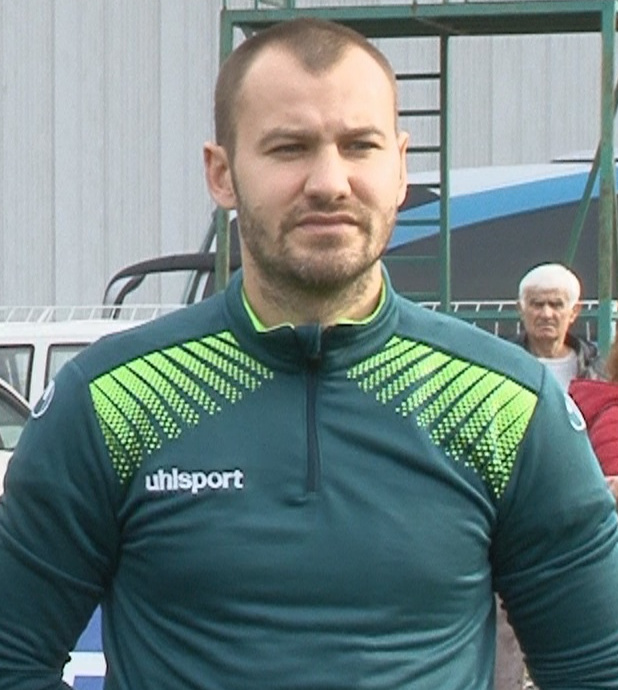

Personal information
- Full name: Blagoy Georgiev Makendzhiev
- Date of birth: 11 July 1988 (age 38)
- Place of birth: Petrich, Bulgaria
- Height: 1.84 m (6 ft 0 in)
- Position: Goalkeeper

Team information
- Current team: Krumovgrad
- Number: 21

Youth career
- Pirin Blagoevgrad

Senior career*
| Years | Team | Apps | (Gls) |
| 2005–2010 | Pirin Blagoevgrad | 49 | (0) |
| 2011–2013 | CSKA Sofia | 3 | (0) |
| 2013–2016 | Beroe | 75 | (0) |
| 2017 | Pirin Blagoevgrad | 33 | (0) |
| 2018 | Cherno More | 28 | (0) |
| 2019–2020 | Dunav Ruse | 39 | (0) |
| 2020–2021 | Montana | 22 | (0) |
| 2021–2025 | Krumovgrad | 67 | (0) |
| 2025 | Yambol | 12 | (0) |
| 2026– | Krumovgrad | 5 | (0) |

International career
| 2015 | Bulgaria B | 1 | (0) |
| 2015–2019 | Bulgaria | 0 | (0) |
- * Club domestic league appearances and goals as of 30 October 2026

Blagoy Makendzhiev (Bulgarian: Благой Макенджиев; born 11 July 1988) is a Bulgarian professional footballer who plays as a goalkeeper for Krumovgrad.

== Career ==
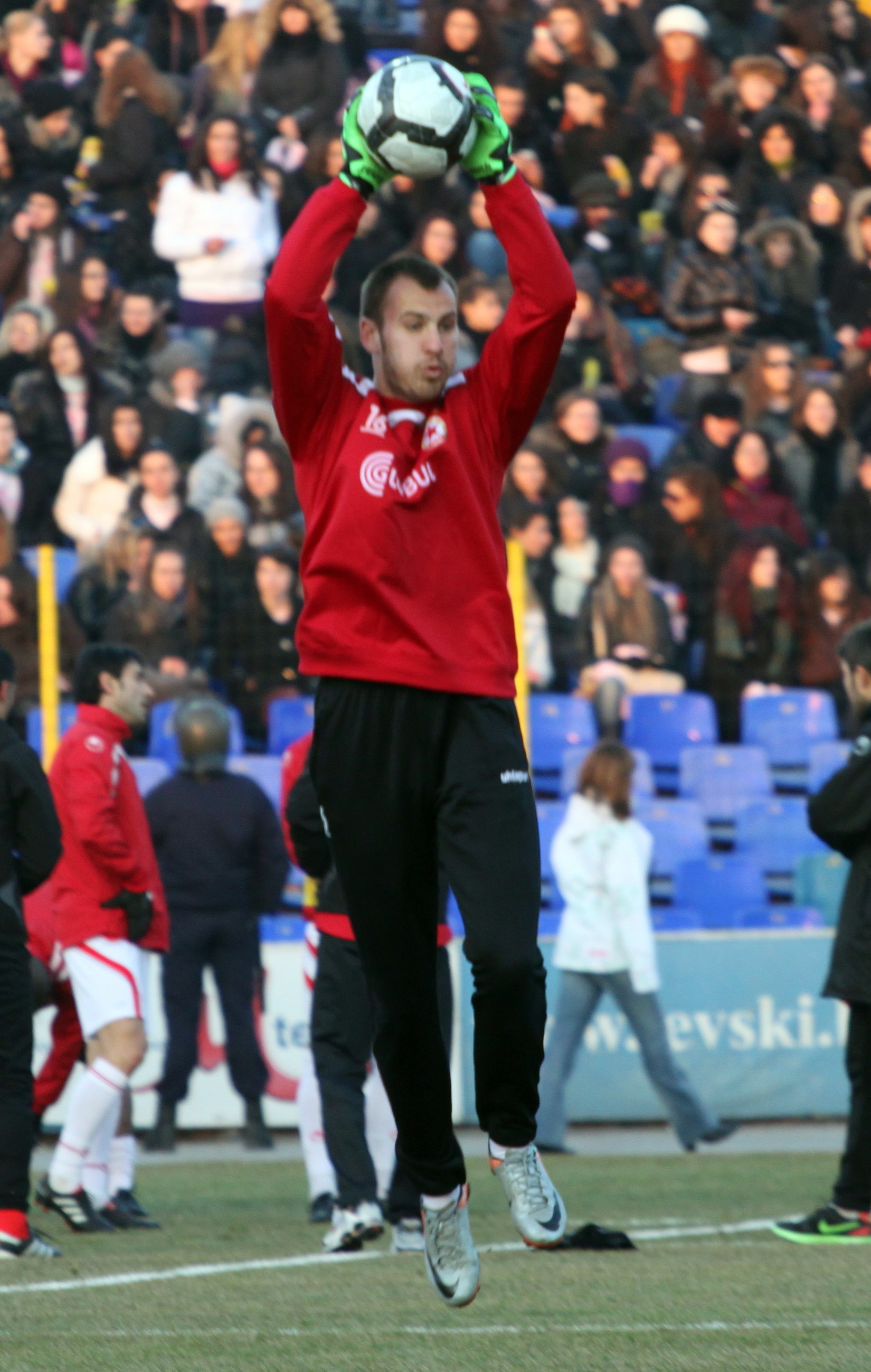
Makendzhiev with CSKA in 2011

Makendzhiev began his professional career at Pirin Blagoevgrad. He made his competitive debut on 9 November 2005 in a match against Lokomotiv Sofia. In the next two seasons he played in only 4 games. During the 2009–10 season, he gradually established himself as the first choice goalkeeper for Pirin.

In December 2010, Makendzhiev signed a 3-year contract with CSKA Sofia. On 18 May 2011 he made his official debut for CSKA in a home draw 2–2 against his former club Pirin Blagoevgrad. In 2011–12 season he spend most of the time on the bench, earning only one league appearance, coming as a substitute when Raïs M'Bolhi received a red card in away win 0–2 against Litex Lovech. After the managerial departure of Stoycho Mladenov from CSKA, Miodrag Ješić was appointed as head coach. Blagoy was not part of the plans of the new manager. In January 2013 he was released by the club.

In June 2013, Makendzhiev joined Beroe Stara Zagora as a free agent. He quickly established as first choice goalkeeper, having initially served as an understudy to Ivan Karadzhov.

In February 2017, Makendzhiev joined his hometown club Pirin Blagoevgrad. He immediately established himself as a first choice goalkeeper, contributing to Pirin's improved performances and results. However, at the end of the yеar his contract was terminated by mutual consent.

On 18 December 2017, Makendzhiev signed with Cherno More. On 17 February 2018, he made his debut in a 1–4 home defeat by Beroe.

In the summer of 2021, he became part of the ranks of Levski Krumovgrad.

== International career ==
On 27 January 2015, Makendzhiev received his first call-up to the Bulgaria national team for the Friendly game against Romania on 7 February 2015 in Antalya from Ivaylo Petev. He played over the course of the entire second half, keeping a clean sheet in the non-official friendly match that ended with a score of 0:0. He was named as part of Bulgaria's 2016 Kirin Cup squad.

== Career statistics ==
As of 14 December 2018

| Club | Season | League | | Cup | | Europe | | Total | |
| Club | Season | Apps | Goals | Apps | Goals | Apps | Goals | Apps | Goals |
|---|---|---|---|---|---|---|---|---|---|
| Pirin Blagoevgrad | 2005–06 | 0 | 0 | 1 | 0 | – | – | 1 | 0 |
| Pirin Blagoevgrad | 2006–07 | 3 | 0 | 1 | 0 | – | – | 4 | 0 |
| Pirin Blagoevgrad | 2007–08 | 0 | 0 | 0 | 0 | – | – | 0 | 0 |
| Pirin Blagoevgrad | 2008-09 | 11 | 0 | 2 | 0 | – | – | 13 | 0 |
| Pirin Blagoevgrad | 2009-10 | 20 | 0 | 1 | 0 | – | – | 21 | 0 |
| Pirin Blagoevgrad | 2010-11 | 15 | 0 | 2 | 0 | – | – | 17 | 0 |
| CSKA Sofia | 2010-11 | 2 | 0 | 0 | 0 | – | – | 2 | 0 |
| CSKA Sofia | 2011-12 | 1 | 0 | 1 | 0 | – | – | 2 | 0 |
| CSKA Sofia | 2012-13 | 0 | 0 | 0 | 0 | – | – | 0 | 0 |
| Beroe | 2013-14 | 5 | 0 | 2 | 0 | – | – | 7 | 0 |
| Beroe | 2014-15 | 22 | 0 | 2 | 0 | – | – | 24 | 0 |
| Beroe | 2015-16 | 29 | 0 | 0 | 0 | 4 | 0 | 33 | 0 |
| Beroe | 2016–17 | 19 | 0 | 1 | 0 | 4 | 0 | 24 | 0 |
| Pirin Blagoevgrad | 2016–17 | 13 | 0 | 1 | 0 | – | – | 14 | 0 |
| Pirin Blagoevgrad | 2017–18 | 20 | 0 | 0 | 0 | – | – | 20 | 0 |
| Cherno More | 2017–18 | 15 | 0 | 0 | 0 | – | – | 15 | 0 |
| Cherno More | 2018–19 | 14 | 0 | 1 | 0 | – | – | 15 | 0 |
| Career totals | | 189 | 0 | 15 | 0 | 8 | 0 | 212 | 0 |
