= Tiago Rodrigues =

Portuguese footballer (born 1992)

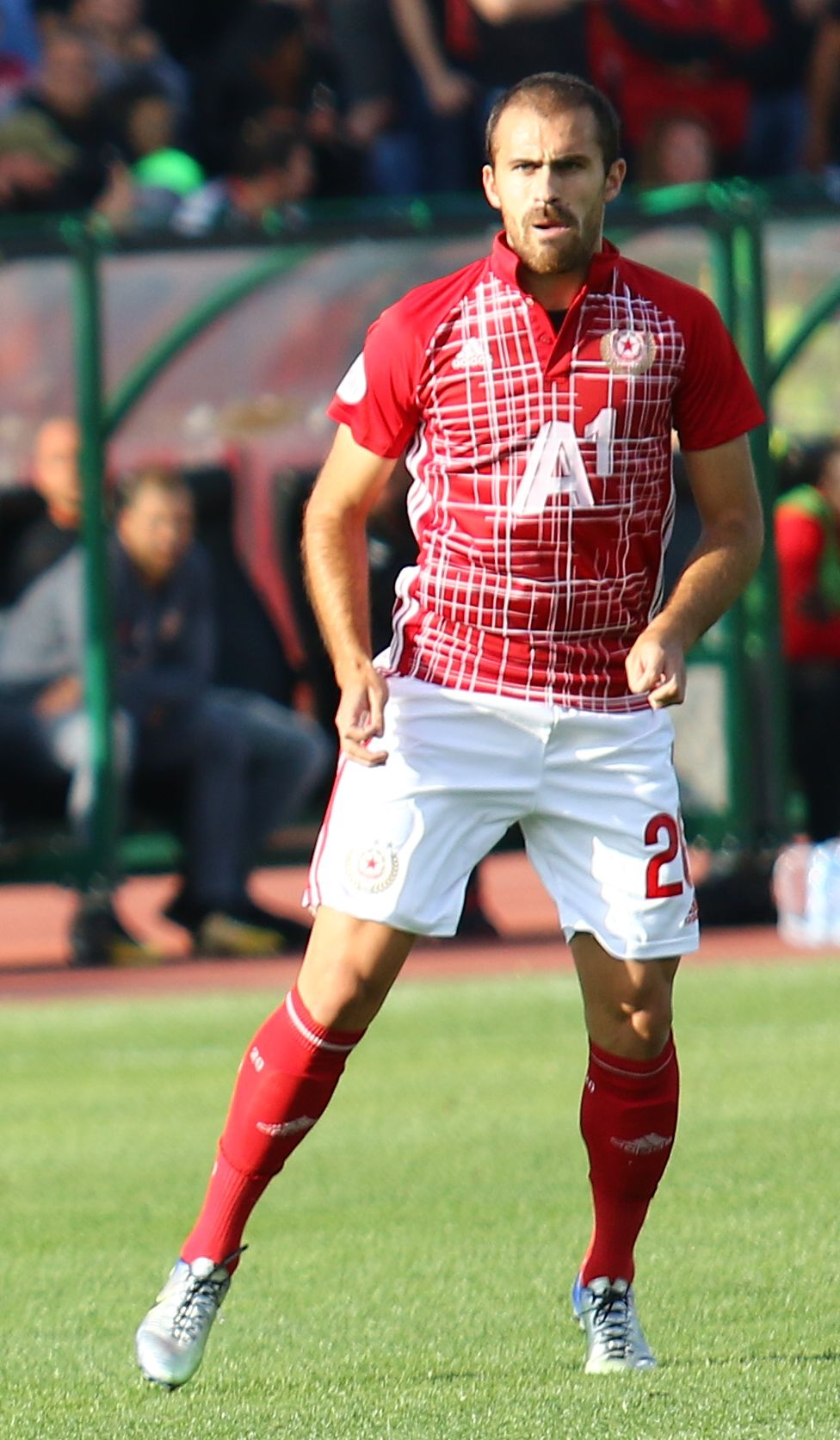
- Rodrigues with CSKA Sofia in 2018

Personal information
- Full name: Tiago Filipe Sousa Nóbrega Rodrigues
- Date of birth: 29 January 1992 (age 34)
- Place of birth: Vila Real, Portugal
- Height: 1.77 m (5 ft 10 in)
- Position: Midfielder

Youth career
- 2000–2006: Diogo Cão
- 2006–2008: Sporting CP
- 2008–2011: Vitória Guimarães

Senior career*
Years	Team	Apps	(Gls)
2011–2013	Vitória Guimarães	20	(4)
2011–2012	→ Amarante (loan)	17	(3)
2012–2013	Vitória Guimarães B	17	(3)
2013–2017	Porto	0	(0)
2013–2014	Porto B	17	(2)
2013–2014	→ Vitória Guimarães (loan)	21	(2)
2015	→ Nacional (loan)	18	(4)
2015–2016	→ Marítimo (loan)	18	(1)
2016–2017	→ Nacional (loan)	22	(1)
2017–2021	CSKA Sofia	118	(28)
2021–2022	Al-Hazem	16	(1)
2022	Ufa	4	(0)
2023–2024	Gençlerbirliği	24	(0)
2024–2025	Penafiel	30	(1)

International career
2009–2010	Portugal U18	4	(3)
2010–2011	Portugal U19	8	(1)
2012–2013	Portugal U21	5	(0)
- * Club domestic league appearances and goals as of 11:20, 23 May 2025 (UTC)

Tiago Filipe Sousa Nóbrega Rodrigues (born 29 January 1992) is a Portuguese professional footballer who plays as a midfielder.

== Club career ==
Born in Vila Real, Vila Real District, Rodrigues played youth football with three clubs, including Sporting CP and Vitória de Guimarães. Loaned by the latter, he made his senior debut with Amarante in the third division.

Returned to the Minho side for 2012–13, Rodrigues initially represented both the A and B teams, the latter competing in the Segunda Liga. He made his Primeira Liga debut for the former on 21 September 2012, playing the second half in the 1–0 away win against Moreirense. He also featured the full 90 minutes in that season's Taça de Portugal final, a 2–1 victory over Benfica which was Vitória's first-ever win in the tournament.

On 16 April 2013, before the campaign was over, Rodrigues agreed to join Porto on 1 July, moving alongside teammate Ricardo. He never represented the first team in competitive games, going on to appear for their reserves as well as being loaned to Guimarães, Nacional (twice) and Marítimo.

Rodrigues signed a two-year deal with Bulgarian club CSKA Sofia on 1 July 2017. On 14 January 2019, he extended his contract until June 2022; he eventually became the highest-scoring foreign player (alongside Fernando Karanga) in The Eternal Derby, totalling three goals.

Rodrigues continued playing abroad the following seasons, with Al-Hazem in the Saudi Professional League and Ufa in the Russian Premier League. On 5 January 2023, he joined TFF First League side Gençlerbirliği on a one-and-a-half-year contract.

In August 2024, Rodrigues returned to Portugal seven years after leaving, agreeing to a one-year contract at second-tier Penafiel.

== Career statistics ==
As of 15 May 2025

Club performance			League		Cup		Continental^{1}		Other^{2}		Total	
Club	League	Season	Apps	Goals	Apps	Goals	Apps	Goals	Apps	Goals	Apps	Goals
Vitória Guimarães	Primeira Liga	2011–12	0	0	0	0	0	0	0	0	0	0
Amarante (loan)	Segunda Divisão	2011–12	17	3	0	0	–		0	0	17	3
Vitória Guimarães B (loan)	Segunda Liga	2012–13	17	3	–		–		–		17	3
Vitória Guimarães	Primeira Liga	2012–13	20	4	4	0	–		1	0	25	4
Porto	Primeira Liga	2013–14	0	0	0	0	0	0	0	0	0	0
Porto B (loan)	Segunda Liga	2013–14	4	0	–		–		–		4	0
Vitória Guimarães (loan)	Primeira Liga	2013–14	21	2	1	0	4	0	1	0	27	2
Porto B (loan)	Segunda Liga	2014–15	13	2	–		–		–		13	2
Nacional (loan)	Primeira Liga	2014–15	18	4	3	0	0	0	1	0	22	4
Marítimo (loan)	Primeira Liga	2015–16	18	1	1	0	0	0	4	2	23	3
Nacional (loan)	Primeira Liga	2016–17	22	1	0	0	0	0	0	0	22	1
CSKA Sofia	First League	2017–18	34	9	3	0	–		–		37	9
CSKA Sofia	First League	2018–19	33	8	2	0	5	1	–		40	9
CSKA Sofia	First League	2019–20	24	8	5	0	3	1	–		32	9
CSKA Sofia	First League	2020–21	27	3	6	1	10	3	–		43	7
CSKA Sofia	Total		118	28	16	1	18	5	0	0	152	34
Al-Hazem	Saudi Professional League	2021–22	16	1	1	0	–		–		17	1
Ufa	Russian Premier League	2021–22	4	0	0	0	–		–		4	0
Gençlerbirliği	1. Lig	2022–23	10	0	0	0	–		–		10	0
Gençlerbirliği	1. Lig	2023–24	14	0	1	1	–		–		15	1
Gençlerbirliği	Total		24	0	1	1	0	0	0	0	25	1
Penafiel	Liga Portugal 2	2024–25	30	1	1	0	–		–		31	1
Career total			326	53	23	2	22	5	7	2	381	58

^{1} Includes UEFA Champions League and UEFA Europa League matches.

^{2} Includes Taça da Liga, Supertaça Cândido de Oliveira and Bulgarian Supercup matches.

== Honours ==
Vitória de Guimarães

- Taça de Portugal: 2012–13

CSKA Sofia

- Bulgarian Cup: 2020–21
