= Paulinho (footballer, born May 1993) =

Brazilian footballer

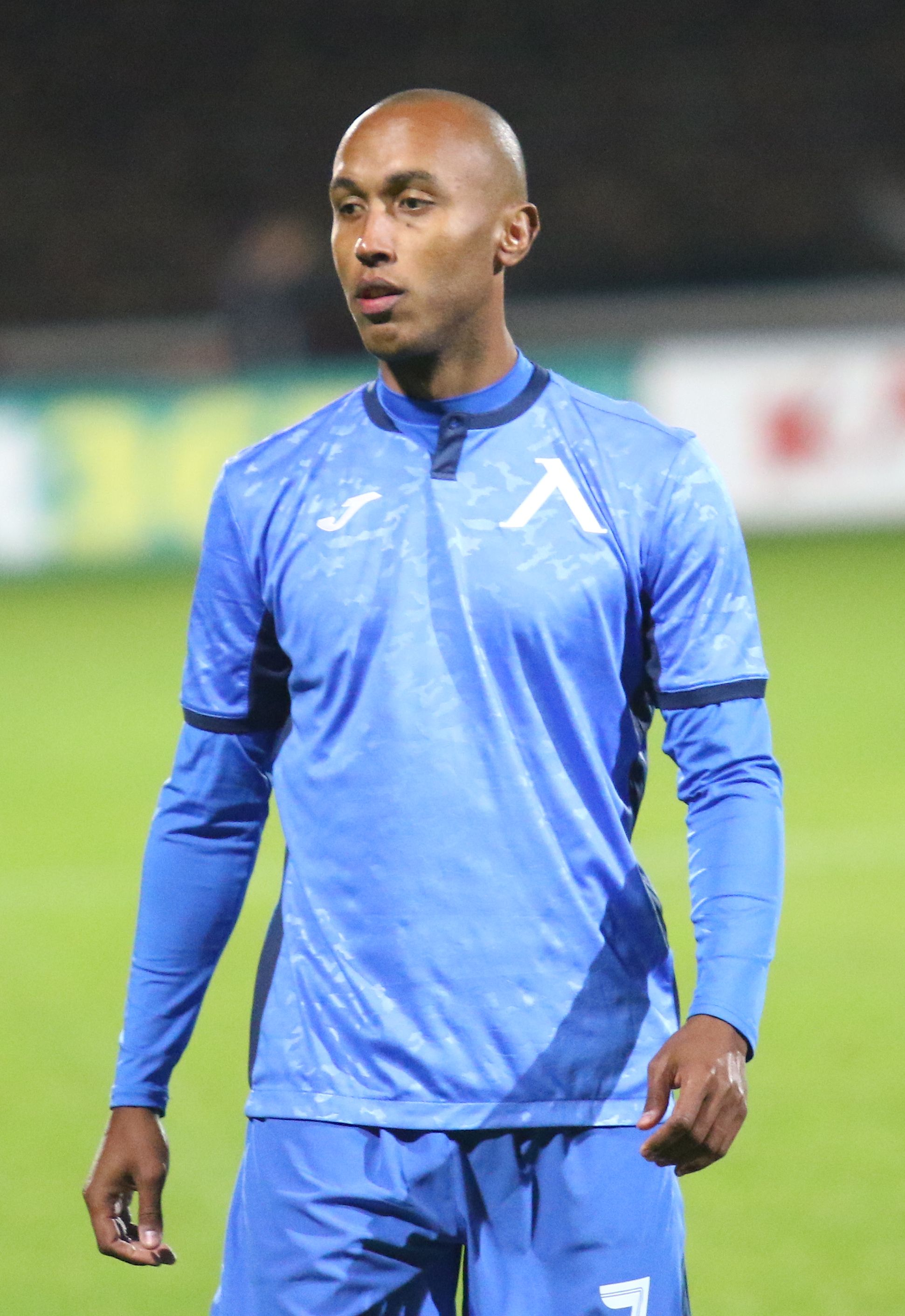

Personal information
- Full name: Paulo Victor de Menezes Melo
- Date of birth: 29 May 1993 (age 33)
- Place of birth: São Paulo, Brazil
- Height: 1.77 m (5 ft 9 1/2 in)
- Position: Winger

Team information
- Current team: Chungbuk Cheongju
- Number: 10

Youth career
- 2011–2013: Corinthians

Senior career*
Years	Team	Apps	(Gls)
2013–2015	Corinthians	9	(0)
2014	→ América-RN (loan)	10	(1)
2015	→ Rio Claro (loan)	14	(1)
2015	→ Portuguesa (loan)	9	(2)
2016–2017	Zorya Luhansk	40	(4)
2018–2021	Levski Sofia	87	(22)
2021–2022	Khor Fakkan	22	(6)
2023–	Chungbuk Cheongju	4	(2)
- * Club domestic league appearances and goals as of 17:47, 21 March 2023 (UTC)

Paulo Victor de Menezes Melo (born 29 May 1993), commonly known as Paulinho, is a Brazilian footballer who plays for South Korean K League 2 club Chungbuk Cheongju as a left winger.

== Career ==
Paulinho began his professional career at Corinthians in 2013. After loan spells at América-RN, Rio Claro and Portuguesa he signed for Ukrainian Premier League club Zorya Luhansk in January 2016.

After spending more than two years with Bulgarian club Levski Sofia, in January 2021, Paulinho joined Khor Fakkan in the United Arab Emirates for a season and a half.

== Career statistics ==
As of 4 January 2023

Club	Season	League		State League		Cup		Continental		Other		Total																
Club	Season	Apps	Goals	Apps	Goals	Apps	Goals	Apps	Goals	Apps	Goals	Apps	Goals															
Corinthians	2013	5	0	1	0	0	0	0	0	—		6	0															
Corinthians	2014	1	0	2	0	0	0	0	0	—		3	0															
Corinthians	Total	6	0	3	0	0	0	0	0	—		9	0															
América-RN	2014	10	1	0	0	2	0	—		—		12	1															
Rio Claro	2015	0	0	14	1	0	0	—		—		14	1															
Portuguesa	2015	9	2	0	0	0	0	—		—		9	2															
Zorya Luhansk	2015–16	5	1	—		2	0	0	0	—		7	1															
Zorya Luhansk	2016–17	31	3	—		1	0	5	0	—		37	3															
Zorya Luhansk	2017–18	4	0	—		0	0	0	0	—		4	0															
Zorya Luhansk	Total	40	4	—		3	0	5	0	—		48	4															
Levski Sofia	2017–18	16	8	—		3	0	—		—		19	8															
Levski Sofia	2018–19	27	2	—		1	0	0	0	—		28	2															
Levski Sofia	2019–20	30	8	—		2	0	4	1	—		36	9															
Levski Sofia	2020–21	14	4	—		0	0	—		—		14	4															
Levski Sofia	Total	87	22	—		6	0	4	1	—		97	23															
Khor Fakkan	2021–22	?	?	?	?	—		—		—		?	?															
Chungbuk Cheongju FC	2023					—		—		—				Betim Futebol	2026]]	Career total	152	29	17	1	11	0	9	1	0	0	189	31

== Honours ==
Corinthians

- Campeonato Paulista: 2013
- Recopa Sudamericana: 2013

Zorya Luhansk

- Ukrainian Cup: Runner-up 2015–16
