= Emil Stoev (footballer, born 1996) =

Bulgarian footballer

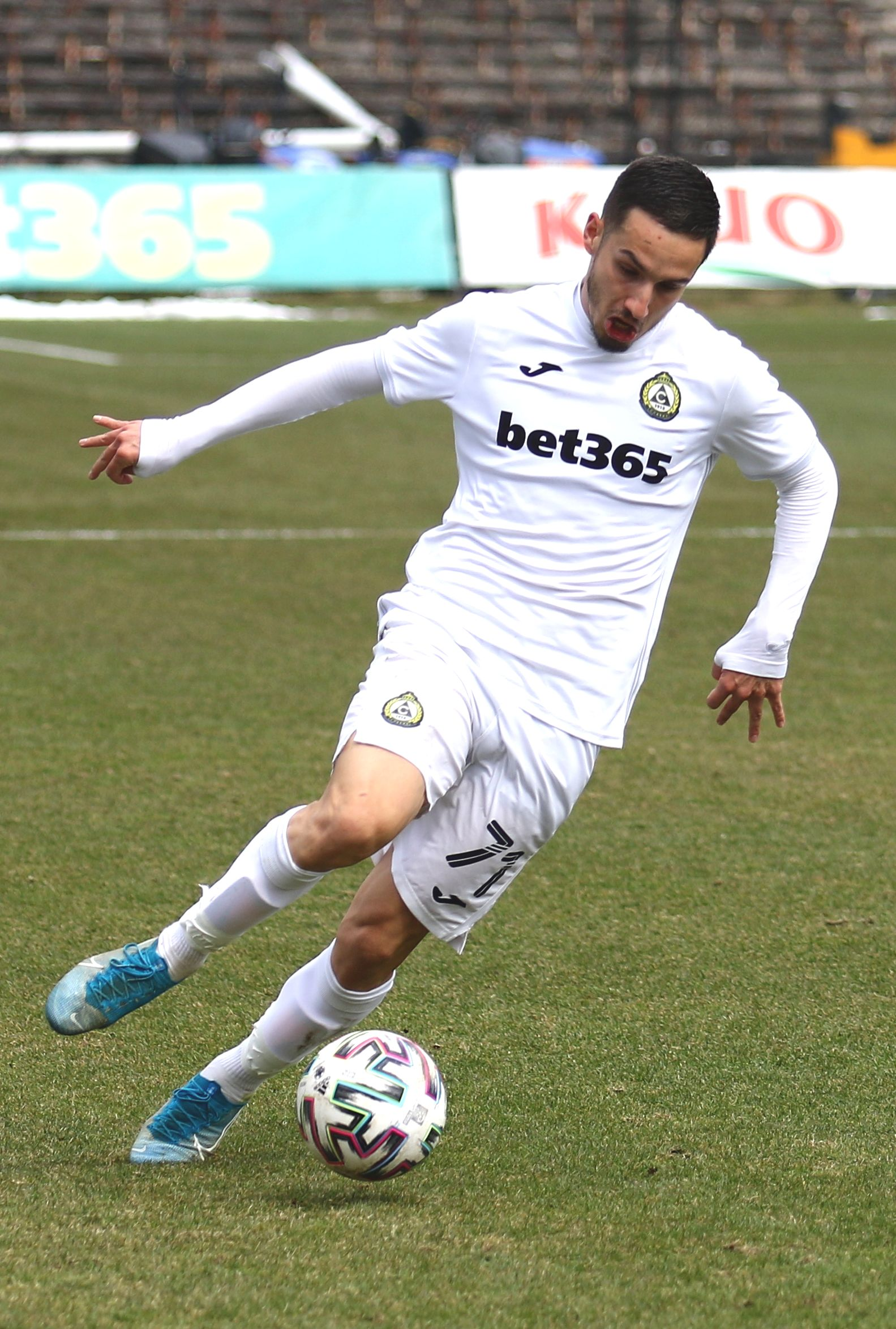

Personal information
- Full name: Emil Svetoslavov Stoev
- Date of birth: 17 January 1996 (age 30)
- Place of birth: Sofia, Bulgaria
- Height: 1.80 m (5 ft 11 in)
- Positions: Attacking midfielder; winger

Team information
- Current team: Slavia Sofia
- Number: 8

Youth career
- 2005–2008: Septemvri Sofia
- 2008–2013: Slavia Sofia

Senior career*
| Years | Team | Apps | (Gls) |
| 2013– | Slavia Sofia | 219 | (17) |
| 2017–2019 | → Botev Vratsa (loan) | 66 | (10) |

International career
| 2012–2013 | Bulgaria U17 | 6 | (0) |
| 2014–2015 | Bulgaria U19 | 3 | (0) |
| 2018 | Bulgaria U21 | 4 | (0) |
- * Club domestic league appearances and goals as of 11 June 2026

Emil Svetoslavov Stoev (Bulgarian: Емил Стоев; born 17 January 1996) is a Bulgarian professional footballer who plays as an attacking midfielder for First League club Slavia Sofia.

== Career ==
Stoev began his career with Slavia Sofia. On 16 February 2017 he was sent on loan to Botev Vratsa until the end of the season. The loan was further extended in July. On 8 January 2018 Stoev returned in Slavia after his loan ended in the end of 2017.

== Career statistics ==
=== Club ===
As of 1 June 2019

| Club performance | | | League | | Cup | | Continental | | Other | | Total | |
| Club | League | Season | Apps | Goals | Apps | Goals | Apps | Goals | Apps | Goals | Apps | Goals |
| Bulgaria | | | League | | Bulgarian Cup | | Europe | | Other (Note: Includes Bulgarian Supercup matches.) | | Total | |
|---|---|---|---|---|---|---|---|---|---|---|---|---|
| Slavia Sofia | A Group | 2013–14 | 4 | 1 | 0 | 0 | – | | – | | 4 | 1 |
| Slavia Sofia | A Group | 2014–15 | 5 | 0 | 1 | 0 | – | | – | | 6 | 0 |
| Slavia Sofia | A Group | 2015–16 | 22 | 1 | 1 | 0 | – | | – | | 23 | 1 |
| Slavia Sofia | First League | 2016–17 | 2 | 0 | 0 | 0 | 0 | 0 | – | | 2 | 0 |
| Slavia Sofia | Total | | 33 | 2 | 2 | 0 | 0 | 0 | 0 | 0 | 35 | 2 |
| Botev Vratsa (loan) | Second League | 2016–17 | 10 | 2 | 0 | 0 | – | | – | | 10 | 2 |
| Botev Vratsa (loan) | Second League | 2017–18 | 28 | 2 | 2 | 1 | – | | – | | 30 | 3 |
| Botev Vratsa (loan) | First League | 2018–19 | 28 | 6 | 0 | 0 | – | | – | | 28 | 6 |
| Botev Vratsa (loan) | Total | | 66 | 10 | 2 | 1 | 0 | 0 | 0 | 0 | 68 | 11 |
| Career total | | | 99 | 12 | 4 | 1 | 0 | 0 | 0 | 0 | 103 | 13 |
