= Nebojša Miličić =

Serbian football manager

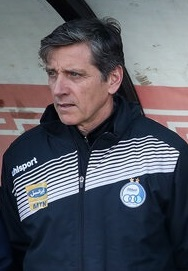

Personal information
- Full name: Nebojša Miličić
- Date of birth: 16 September 1959 (age 67)
- Place of birth: Zemun, Yugoslavia

Managerial career
- Years: Team
- 1988–1993: Zemun (technical director)
- 1994–1998: Fuenlabrada
- 1998–2000: Atlético Madrileño U19
- 2000–2001: Zemun
- 2002–2008: Real Madrid C (technical assistant)
- 2003–2007: Real Madrid U19
- 2008–2011: Real Madrid Castilla
- 2012–2013: Kairat (asst.)
- 2012–2013: Kazakhstan U19
- 2013–2014: Real Madrid C (asst.)
- 2014–2016: Real Madrid (youth co-ordinator)
- 2016–2017: Alcorcón (asst.)
- 2017–2018: Vereya (technical director)
- 2018–2019: Vereya
- 2020: Esteghlal (assistant)

Nebojša Miličić (born 16 September 1959) is a Serbian football manager, who was lately assistant coach of Esteghlal, alongside manager Farhad Majidi.

== Career statistics ==
=== Managerial statistics ===
As of January 2020

Team	From	To	Record							
Team	From	To	G	W	D	L	GF	GA	GD	Win %
Vereya	14 August 2018	18 January 2019	18	0	5	13	10	44	−34	0.00
