= FC Vereya =

Bulgarian football club

- Full name: Professional Football Club Vereya-Stara Zagora
- Nickname: The Lions
- Founded: July 15, 2001; 25 years ago
- Ground: Trace Arena, Stara Zagora, Bulgaria
- Capacity: 3,500
- Head coach: Kolyo Kolev
- League: A RFG Stara Zagora
- 2025–26: A RFG Stara Zagora, 7th
- Website: fcvereya.bg
Home colours	Away colours	Third colours

Vereya (Bulgarian: Верея) is a Bulgarian association football club based in Stara Zagora, currently competing in the A RFG Stara Zagora, the fourth tier of Bulgarian football.

Vereya was founded in 2001. The team made a remarkable rise through the levels of the Bulgarian football system, and by 2016, the club reached the top level of Bulgarian football, the First League, for the first time. In 2019, after three seasons in the First League, they were expelled from it for reported match fixing.

== History ==
=== Foundation and beginning ===
The club was founded in 2001 by a founding board led by Hristiyan Parvanov, Galin Mihaylov, Slavcho Tanev, Tonko Totev and Dimo Hristov. Until the 2005/06 season it was playing in Regional groups before the promotion to the V AFG under the name FC Vereya-Arsenal after a merger with Arsenal Kazanlak, but after the season 2006/07 Vereya-Arsenal became Arsenal Kazanlak and the 2nd team Vereya Bulsatkom moved to Stara Zagora again and was registered as FC Vereya. They won the A RFG 3 times in the next 5 seasons, getting the promotion during the 2011–12 season.

=== Trace Group ownership (2012–present) ===
In 2012, Bulgarian construction company Trace Group started investing in the club and a new stadium project Trace Arena was presented. On May 21, 2014, the club won the Cup of Bulgarian Amateur Football League after defeating Minyor Pernik 2–0 in the final. During the same season Vereya finished 3rd in the V Group and secured promotion to the higher-ranked professional football league, the B Group.

In 2016, the club submitted an application for the newly restructured Bulgarian First League. On June 1, 2016, one of the new signings of the club for the upcoming season, the Brazilian Elias Alves da Silva, announced that he joined the club, as it would compete in the top league of Bulgaria, long before an official statement was given by the BFU officials on the number of the teams competing in the new league, thus sparking controversy.

On June 7, 2016, Vereya, alongside five other B Group outfits, were approved by the Bulgarian Football Union and were promoted to compete in the upcoming 2016-17 Bulgarian First League. Vereya was one of the clubs with the necessary financial and infrastructural requirements for the new first tier.

In its first ever season in the top level (2016–17), Vereya managed to secure a 7th-place finish, thus remaining part of the elite for next season.

In its second season in the top level (2017–18), Vereya surprised many, by finishing in the top 6 in the regular season.

The third season in the elite was not that successful, however. It was marked by financial problems. On 7 May 2019, Vereya were disqualified from the league for match fixing. All results from played matches involving Vereya were retained with the Bulgarian Football Union awarding Septemvri Sofia two wins by 3–0 from their scheduled relegation play-off matches with Vereya and the loser from the relegation play-off match between Dunav Ruse and Vitosha Bistritsa (the latter) directly faced the second-placed team from the Second League (Montana). Vereya was then disqualified from the Second League, due to financial issues, following which they were also disqualified from the third tier, which meant that the team will start the 2019–20 season from the fourth division of Bulgarian football, in this case the Stara Zagora regional league.

== Statistics ==
=== Season to season ===
- Seasons in First League: 3
- Seasons in B Group (now Second League): 2
- Seasons in V Group ( now Third League): 5
- Seasons in A Regional Group: 13

Season	Tier	Division	Place	Bulgarian Cup
2001–02	4	A RFG	N/A	Did Not Play
2002–03	4	A RFG	N/A	DNP
2003–04	4	A RFG	N/A	DNP
2004–05	4	A RFG	N/A	DNP
2005–06	4	A RFG	1st ↑	DNP
2006–07	3	V AFG	7th ↓	DNP
2007–08	4	A RFG	4th	DNP
2008–09	4	A RFG	1st	DNP

Season	Tier	Division	Place	Bulgarian Cup
2009–10	4	A RFG	2nd	DNP
2010–11	4	A RFG	1st	DNP
2011–12	4	A RFG	1st ↑	Second round
2012–13	3	V AFG	5th	DNP
2013–14	3	V AFG	3rd ↑	DNP
2014–15	2	B PFG	11th	First round
2015–16	2	B PFG	8th ↑	First round
2016–17	1	First League	7th	Semifinals

Season	Tier	Division	Place	Bulgarian Cup
2017–18	1	First League	6th	First round
2018–19	1	First League	14th ↓	Second round
2019–20	4	A RFG	3rd ↑	DNP
2020–21	3	Third League	18th ↓	DNP
2021–22	4	A RFG	4th ↑	DNP
2022–23	3	Third League	20th ↓	DNP
2023–24	4	A RFG		DNP

== Shirt and sponsors ==
Vereya main colors are blue and white.

Period	Kit manufacturer	Shirt partner
2006–2012	Unknown	Bulsatcom / Trace Group
2012–2014	(Bulgaria) Tomy Sport	Trace Group
2014–2016	(United States) Nike	Trace Group
2016–2018	(Italy) Erreà	Trace Group
2018–2019	(Germany) Uhlsport	Efbet

== Honours ==
- First League:
  - 6th: 2017–18
- Bulgarian Cup:
  - Semifinals: 2016–17
- Second League:
  - 8th 2015–16
- Third League:
  - 3rd: 2013–14
- A RFG Stara Zagora:
  - Winners (4): 2005–06, 2008–09, 2010–11, 2011–12
- Cup of Bulgarian Amateur Football League:
  - Winners (1): 2013–14

== Current squad ==
As of 1 August 2020

Note: Flags indicate national team as defined under FIFA eligibility rules; some limited exceptions apply. Players may hold more than one non-FIFA nationality.

No.	Pos.	Nation	Player
1	GK	BUL	Radostin Yordanov
4	DF	BUL	Yordan Dobrev
5	MF	BUL	Isus Angelov
6	DF	BUL	Ivan Ivanov
7	DF	BUL	Milen Stoyanov
8	MF	BUL	Galin Penev
9	CF	BUL	Desimir Rusev
10	MF	BUL	Ventsislav Ivanov
11	MF	BUL	Mihael Lalev

No.	Pos.	Nation	Player
14	DF	BUL	Georgi Koychev
16	MF	BUL	Steliyan Kolev
17	DF	BUL	Stanimir Petrov
18	MF	BUL	Denislav Zapryanov
20	MF	BUL	Kiril Atanasov
21	FW	BUL	Petar Milkov
22	GK	BUL	Ventsislav Yankov
26	DF	BUL	Vladimir Zafirov (captain)
77	DF	BUL	Zhivko Monev
23	DF	GRE	Konstantinos Laios

== Notable players ==
Had international caps for their respective countries, or held any club record. Players whose name is listed in bold represented their countries while playing for Vereya or at some other point in their careers.

- (Bulgaria) **Zhivko Zhelev**
- (Bulgaria) **Ivan Stoyanov**
- (Bulgaria) **Kostadin Stoyanov**
- (Bulgaria) **Ivo Ivanov**
- (Bulgaria) **Ivan Bandalovski**
- (Bulgaria) **Valeri Domovchiyski**
- (Bulgaria) **Veselin Minev**
- (Bulgaria) **Ventsislav Hristov**
- (Bulgaria) **Daniel Naumov**
- (Bulgaria) **Petar Vitanov**
- (Bulgaria) **Birsent Karagaren**

Europe

- (Moldova) **Alexandru Pașcenco**
- (Latvia) **Andrejs Kovaļovs**

Asia

- (Saudi Arabia) **Hussein Abdulghani**

Africa

- (Morocco) **Yassine El Kharroubi**
- (Niger) **Olivier Bonnes**
- (Republic of the Congo) **Christoffer Mafoumbi**
- (Gabon) **Ulysse Ndong**
- (Gabon) **Alexander N'Doumbou**
- (Ghana) **Samuel Inkoom**
- (Tunisia) **Selim Ben Djemia**

== Managers ==
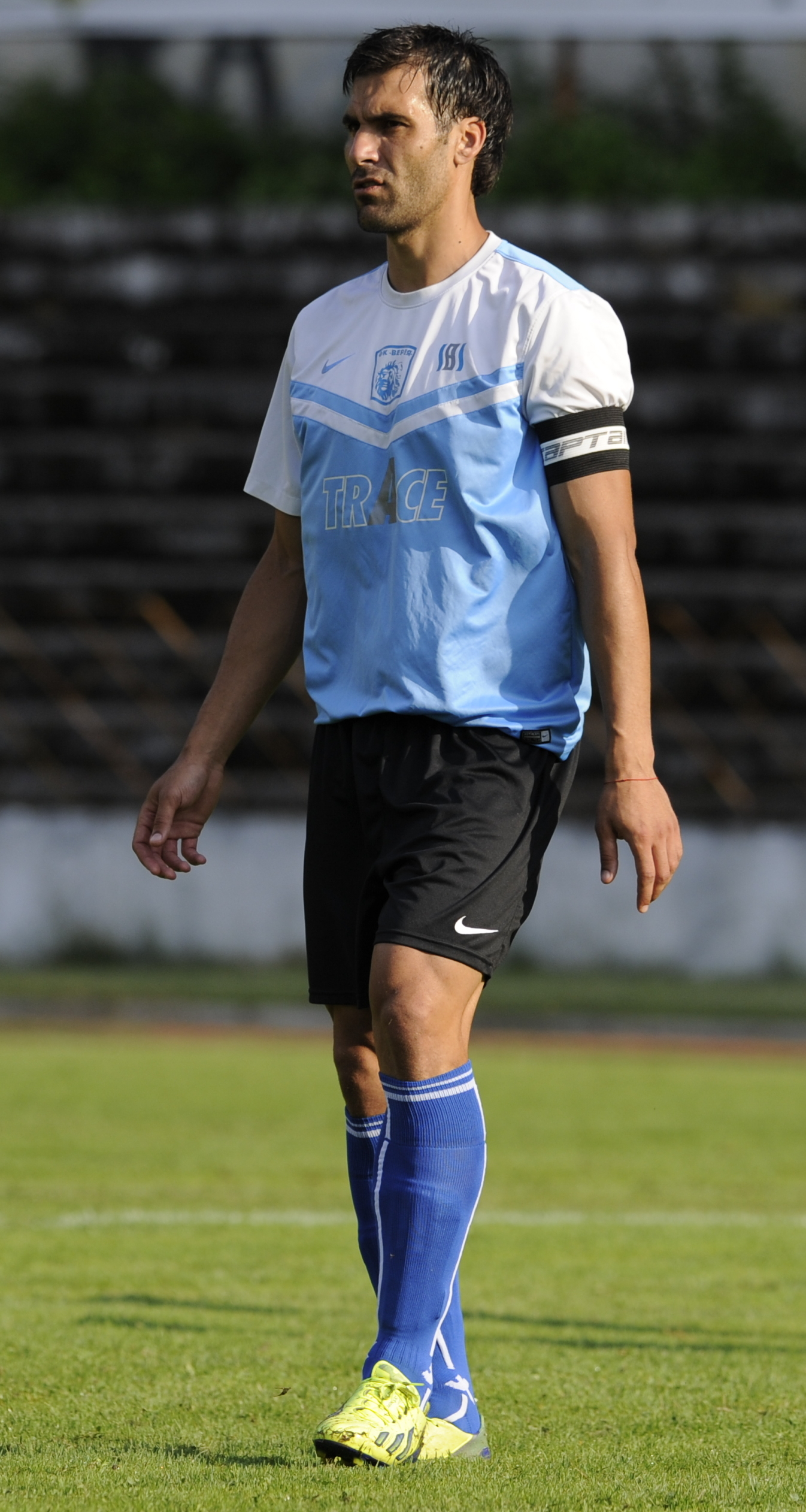
Zhivko Zhelev was appointed Vereya playing head coach in March 2015

Dates	Name	Honours
2001–11	Unknown	
2011–13	(Bulgaria) Kolyo Hristov	
2013–14	(Bulgaria) Petar Kostadinov	1 Amateur Cup title 1 Promotion to B Group
2014	(Bulgaria) Krasimir Manolov	1 Amateur Cup title 1 Promotion to B Group
2014	(Bulgaria) Gospodin Mirchev	
2014–15	(Bulgaria) Radostin Kishishev	
2015–16	(Bulgaria) Zhivko Zhelev (Bulgaria) Vladislav Yanush	
2016–2017	(Bulgaria) Aleksandar Tomash	
2017	(Bulgaria) Ilian Iliev	
2018	(Bulgaria) Blagomir Mitrev	
2018	(Bulgaria) Ivan Kolev	
2018	(Serbia) Nebojša Miličić	
2018	(Bulgaria) Lyudmil Kirov	
2018–2019	(Serbia) Nebojša Miličić	
2019	(Ukraine) Oleksandr Sevidov	
2019	(Bulgaria) Ivan Vutov	
2020–	(Bulgaria) Kolyo Kolev	
