= Alioune Badará =

Senegalese footballer

Personal information
- Full name: Alioune Badará Samb
- Date of birth: 1 October 1989 (age 37)
- Place of birth: Dakar, Senegal
- Height: 1.94 m (6 ft 4 1/2 in)
- Position: Forward

Youth career
- Étoile Lusitana

Senior career*
Years	Team	Apps	(Gls)
2008–2009	Moreirense	5	(0)
2009	→ Famalicão (loan)	–	(–)
2009–2011	Bragança	58	(9)
2011–2012	Melgacense	21	(7)
2012–2013	Fafe	25	(3)
2013–2014	Vianense	15	(2)
2014	Ninense	9	(3)
2014–2016	Montalegre	44	(49)
2016–2017	Amarante	28	(16)
2017–2018	Etar Veliko Tarnovo	28	(10)
2018–2019	Alki Oroklini	8	(0)
2019	Sohar	0	(0)
2020	Al-Arabi	0	(0)
2020–2021	União Leiria	21	(6)
2021–2023	Vitória Setúbal	3	(0)
2022–2023	→ Montalegre (loan)	9	(0)
2023–2024	Septemvri Sofia	19	(4)
2024	Chernomorets 1919	11	(0)
2024–2025	Lokomotiv GO	6	(0)
- * Club domestic league appearances and goals as of 27 July 2024

Alioune Badará Samb (born 1 October 1989) is a Senegalese footballer who plays as a forward.

== Club career ==
After playing youth football for Senegalese academy Étoile Lusitana, Badará spent 9 years of his career with several clubs in Portugal.

On 20 July 2017, Badará signed a two-year contract with Bulgarian club Etar Veliko Tarnovo. On 7 August 2017, he made his debut in a 0–0 away draw against Dunav Ruse, coming on as a substitute for Ivan Petkov.

On 10 September 2019, Badará signed a contract with Oman Professional League team Sohar.

In October 2020, he joined Portuguese club União Leiria.
