= Aleksandar Tomash =

Bulgarian footballer and manager

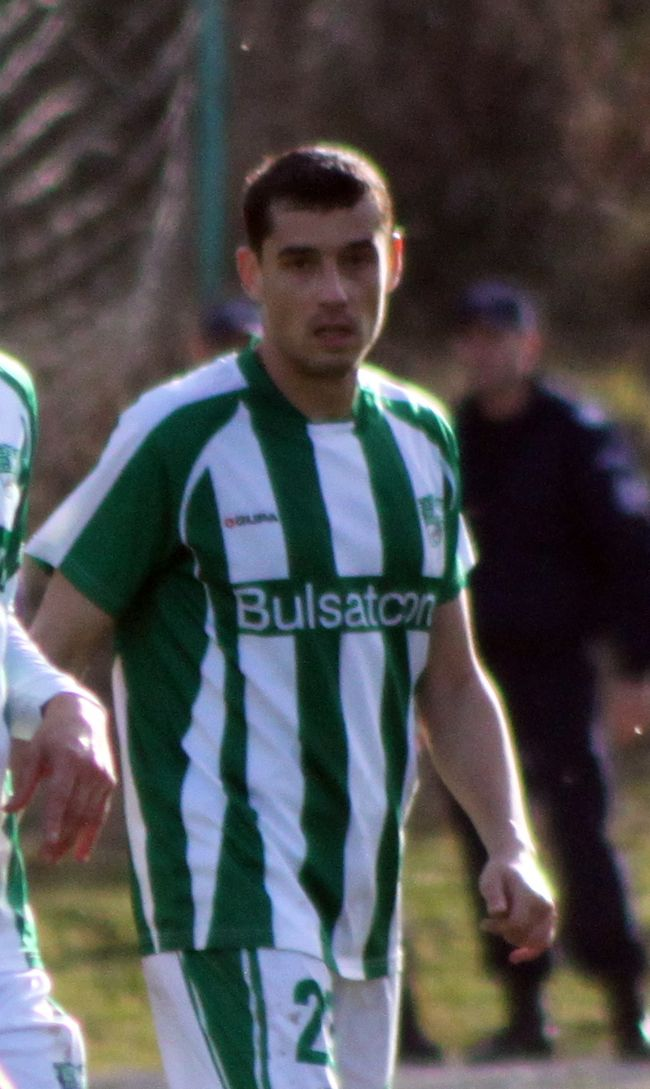
- Tomash as a player in 2010

Personal information
- Full name: Aleksandar Tomash Tomovski
- Date of birth: 2 September 1978 (age 48)
- Place of birth: Veliko Tarnovo, Bulgaria
- Height: 1.79 m (5 ft 10 in)
- Positions: Centre back; left back

Senior career*
Years	Team	Apps	(Gls)
1996–2004	CSKA Sofia	122	(2)
1998	→ Maritsa Plovdiv (loan)	14	(0)
2004–2005	OFI	48	(2)
2005–2006	Metalurh Zaporizhzhia	3	(0)
2006–2008	Cherno More	44	(1)
2008–2009	Baku	23	(0)
2010	Slavia Sofia	12	(0)
2010–2011	Beroe Stara Zagora	27	(0)
2011–2012	Etar 1924	23	(1)
Total		316	(6)

International career
2000–2001	Bulgaria	6	(0)

Managerial career
- 2012–2013: Beroe Stara Zagora (assistant)
- 2013–2015: Bansko
- 2016: Lokomotiv Gorna Oryahovitsa
- 2016–2017: Vereya Stara Zagora
- 2017–2019: Beroe Stara Zagora
- 2020–2021: Etar Veliko Tarnovo
- 2022–2024: Lokomotiv Plovdiv
- 2024: Spartak Varna
- 2024–2025: CSKA Sofia
- * Club domestic league appearances and goals

Aleksandar Tomash (Bulgarian: Александър Томаш; born 2 September 1978) is a Bulgarian football manager and former player.

During his playing career as a defender, he made several appearances for CSKA Sofia, OFI, Metalurh Zaporizhya, Cherno More Varna, FC Baku, Slavia Sofia, Beroe Stara Zagora and Etar 1924 Veliko Tarnovo.

== Coaching career ==
After serving as assistant to Ivko Ganchev at Beroe during the 2012/2013 season, Tomash began his coaching career at Bansko, leading the team for 2 years, before moving to Lokomotiv GO.

=== Vereya Stara Zagora ===
On 10 June 2016 he was appointed as manager at the newly promoted to First Professional League team Vereya. The team finished on 10th position in the regular season and qualified for the Relegation Group A. Vereya finished 1st in the group and qualified for the European play-off.

=== Beroe Stara Zagora ===
On 23 May 2017 Tomash was announced as the new manager of the other Stara Zagora team - Beroe, taking over the coaching duties at the team from 1 June.

=== Lokomotiv Plovdiv ===
On 11 April 2022, Tomash was appointed as manager of Lokomotiv Plovdiv.

=== Spartak Varna ===
On 10 June 2024, Aleksandar Tomash was introduced as the new head coach of Spartak Varna, who returned to the highest level of football in Bulgaria. After a very start to the season, after which Spartak is in the top form and first positions, and after victories against some of the leaders of league, Tomash leaves Spartak on 27 August 2024, after CSKA Sofia pays his forfeit and brings him as head coach of the team, fulfilling his childhood dream.

=== CSKA Sofia ===
Tomash returned to the club from his childhood and whose former player he was on 28 August 2024.

== Managerial statistics ==
As of 31 May 2025

Team	From	To	Record							
Team	From	To	G	W	D	L	Win %	GF	GA	GD
Bansko	1 July 2013	5 December 2015	80	37	20	23	46.25	117	69	47
Lokomotiv GO	23 March 2016	7 June 2016	9	2	5	2	22.22	15	12	3
Vereya	10 June 2016	5 June 2017	26	11	5	10	42.31	33	37	-4
Beroe Stara Zagora	8 June 2017	22 October 2019	90	41	21	28	45.56	123	104	19
Etar Veliko Tarnovo	19 November 2020	16 June 2021	21	6	7	8	28.57	16	23	-7
Lokomotiv Plovdiv	11 April 2022	23 May 2024	79	33	20	26	41.77	99	96	3
Spartak Varna	10 June 2024	27 August 2024	6	4	1	1	66.67	10	5	5
CSKA Sofia	28 August 2024	31 May 2025	38	22	10	6	57.89	66	23	43
Total			343	150	89	104	43.73	479	369	110

== Honours ==
CSKA Sofia

- A Group: 1996–97, 2002–03
- Bulgarian Cup: 1997, 1999

Baku

- Azerbaijan Premier League: 2008–09

Etar 1924

- B Group: 2011–12
