= Kostadin Angelov =

Bulgarian coach

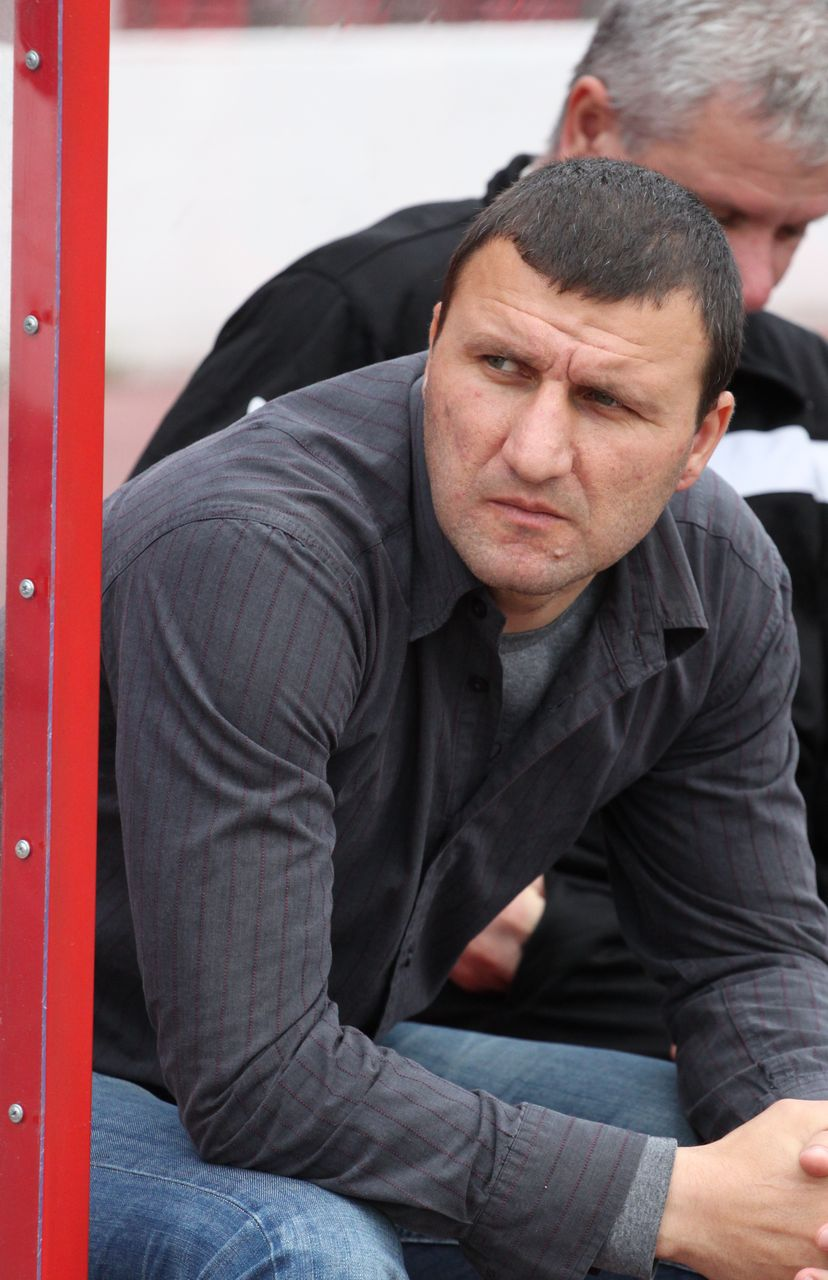

Personal information
- Full name: Kostadin Georgiev Angelov
- Date of birth: 9 January 1973 (age 53)
- Place of birth: Sofia, PR Bulgaria
- Position: Defender

Team information
- Current team: Akademik Sofia (manager)

Youth career
- CSKA Sofia

Senior career*
Years	Team	Apps	(Gls)
1990–1992	NSA Vasil Levski		
1992–1996	Chardafon		
1996–2002	Vidima-Rakovski		

Managerial career
- 2002–2006: Vidima-Rakovski (assistant coach)
- 2006–2008: Vidima-Rakovski
- 2008–2009: Botev Plovdiv
- 2009–2010: Pro Duta
- 2010–2011: Pirin Blagoevgrad
- 2011–2012: Vidima-Rakovski
- 2013: Pirin Gotse Delchev
- 2014: Oborishte
- 2015–2018: Vitosha Bistritsa
- 2018–2020: Vitosha Bistritsa (sporting director)
- 2020: Vitosha Bistritsa
- 2020–2021: Yantra Gabrovo
- 2023–2025: CSKA Sofia (director of youth academy)
- 2026–: Akademik Sofia
- * Club domestic league appearances and goals

Kostadin "The Laptop" Angelov (Bulgarian: Костадин Ангелов - Лаптопа) (born 9 January 1973) is a Bulgarian football manager, who is currently the manager of Akademik Sofia. He holds a Pro license from the Bulgarian Coaching School and a higher education with a master's degree from the NSA "Vasil Levski" with a degree in Sports Management. He has two children, Gergana Angelova (born 1999), and Daniel Angelov (born 2007).

== Early life and career ==
He grew up in the school of CSKA and competed for "Chardafon" (Gabrovo) and "Vidima-Rakovski" (Sevlievo).

== Coaching career ==
He started his coaching career in Sevlievo, as an assistant to Plamen Markov, setting a record for the youngest specialist leading a team in Group A. After Plamen Markov left, when the club's management voted for him, he managed to promote the team of FC "Vidima-Rakovski" (Sevlievo) to the highest Bulgarian division, the A Group. In 2008, he was appointed head coach of Botev (Plovdiv), in 2009 he left for Indonesia, where he coached the team of "Pro Duta". In September 2010, he was appointed as coach of Pirin (Blagoevgrad). He managed to preserve Pirin (Blagoevgrad)'s place in the A Group despite the difficult financial situation of the club. After the bankruptcy of Pirin (Blagoevgrad), he took over FC Vidima-Rakovski (Sevlievo) for the second time, and in the decisive promotion/relegation playoff for the A Group, he managed to save the Sevlievo team as well, thus becoming the only coach who has managed to retain the top flight status of two teams in one season. In 2013, he led Pirin "Gotse Delchev" in "A" group and in 2014-2015 Oborishte (Panagyurishte) in "B" group. He left the club, leaving him in the first place. In 2015, he took over Vitosha (Bistritsa) in amateur football and in 3 years he managed to climb the club to the First League after a barrage against Neftohimik (Burgas). In 2018 he managed to save the football club Vitosha (Bistritsa), winning the barrages for promotion / stay in the First League against Pirin (Blagoevgrad) and Lokomotiv (Sofia). The following year he retired from coaching and began to hold the position of general manager of Vitosha (Bistritsa). He has the main credit for the ascent of Vitosha from the amateur to the top league. In October 2020, Angelov returned to management, being appointed as head coach of Yantra Gabrovo, replacing Stoyan Atsarov.
