= Trace Arena =

Stadium in Bulgaria

- Interactive map of Trace Arena
- Location: Stara Zagora, Bulgaria
- Coordinates: 42°23′44″N 25°38′49″E
- Owner: Trace Group Hold PLC
- Operator: Vereya
- Capacity: 3,500
- Surface: Grass
- Field size: 105 x 68
- Public transit: Trolleybus lines 2, 26

Construction
- Opened: 2001
- Renovated: 2014; 2016
- Expanded: 2016

Tenant
- Vereya (2001–) Vereya II (2012–)

Trace Arena (Bulgarian: Трейс Арена) is a multi-purpose stadium in Stara Zagora, Bulgaria. It is currently used for football matches and is the home ground of local football club Vereya. The stadium has a seating capacity of 3,500 spectators. It is owned by the Bulgarian construction company Trace Group Hold PLC, who also have the naming rights to the venue.

== History ==
In 2014, the stadium underwent partial reconstruction as electric floodlights were installed. Construction of the main stand began during the same year, and was opened in early 2016. Following Vereya's promotion to the Bulgarian First League, the construction of another stand opposing the main one began in the summer of 2016, and was completed by September.

In 2017 the stadium hosted the Amateur Football League Cup final. It was also chosen as the venue for the 2018 Bulgarian Supercup final on July 5, 2018, which was contested between Ludogorets Razgrad and Slavia Sofia.
