= 2016–17 PFC CSKA Sofia season =

CSKA Sofia
2016–17 season
- Controlling owner: Grisha Ganchev
- Manager: Hristo Yanev (until 21 August 2016); Edward Iordănescu (until 27 November 2016); Stamen Belchev (since 28 November 2016)
- Parva Liga: Second place
- Bulgarian Cup: First Round
Home colours	Away colours

The 2016–17 season was CSKA Sofia's 68th season in the Bulgarian A Football Group after their administrative relegation in the third division during the past season due to mounting financial troubles. This article shows player statistics and all matches (official and friendly) that the club will play during the 2016–17 season.

== Players ==
=== Squad stats ===
No.	Pos	Nat	Player	Total		Parva Liga		Bulgarian Cup	
No.	Pos	Nat	Player	Apps	Goals	Apps	Goals	Apps	Goals
2	DF	(Bulgaria) BUL	Stoycho Atanasov	7	0	7	0	0	0
3	DF	(Bulgaria) BUL	Anton Nedyalkov	35	0	34	0	0+1	0
4	DF	(Bulgaria) BUL	Bozhidar Chorbadzhiyski	32	3	31	3	1	0
5	DF	(Bulgaria) BUL	Martin Simeonov	1	0	1	0	0	0
6	MF	(Portugal) POR	Rúben Pinto	28	2	25+2	2	1	0
7	FW	(Ecuador) ECU	Kevin Mercado	14	1	4+10	1	0	0
8	FW	(Republic of the Congo) CGO	Kévin Koubemba	12	0	6+6	0	0	0
9	FW	(Brazil) BRA	Fernando Karanga	12	6	12	6	0	0
10	MF	(Portugal) POR	Arsénio Nunes	29	4	25+3	4	1	0
10	MF	(Bulgaria) BUL	Rumen Rumenov	1	0	1	0	0	0
11	DF	(Bulgaria) BUL	Stanislav Manolev	24	0	23+1	0	0	0
12	GK	(Bulgaria) BUL	Georgi Kitanov	34	0	33	0	1	0
14	DF	(Bulgaria) BUL	Nikolay Bodurov	16	1	16	1	0	0
15	MF	(Bulgaria) BUL	Kristiyan Malinov	18	0	8+9	0	1	0
16	DF	(Bulgaria) BUL	Krasimir Stanoev	2	0	1+1	0	0	0
17	MF	(Portugal) POR	David Simão	22	3	17+5	3	0	0
18	MF	(Bulgaria) BUL	Aleksandar Georgiev	7	0	2+4	0	1	0
19	FW	(Bulgaria) BUL	Kiril Despodov	25	4	15+10	4	0	0
19	MF	(Bulgaria) BUL	Mitko Mitkov	1	0	0+1	0	0	0
20	MF	(Cameroon) CMR	Petrus Boumal	22	2	17+5	2	0	0
20	MF	(Bulgaria) BUL	Petar Vitanov	1	0	1	0	0	0
21	FW	(Portugal) POR	Rui Pedro	26	5	16+9	4	0+1	1
21	MF	(Bulgaria) BUL	Radoslav Iliev	1	0	0+1	0	0	0
22	MF	(Bulgaria) BUL	Nikola Kolev	9	0	5+4	0	0	0
23	DF	(Bulgaria) BUL	Aleksandar Dyulgerov	20	1	14+5	1	1	0
25	FW	(Bulgaria) BUL	Tonislav Yordanov	1	0	1	0	0	0
26	MF	(Colombia) COL	Gustavo Culma	30	7	26+4	7	0	0
26	MF	(Bulgaria) BUL	Georgi Tartov	1	0	1	0	0	0
28	DF	(Bulgaria) BUL	Plamen Galabov	2	0	1+1	0	0	0
29	FW	(Bulgaria) BUL	Milcho Angelov	11	4	1+9	4	0+1	0
29	DF	(Bulgaria) BUL	Milen Manchev	1	0	0+1	0	0	0
30	GK	(Bulgaria) BUL	Aleksandar Konov	3	0	3	0	0	0
Players sold or loaned out after the start of the season:
1	GK	(Bulgaria) BUL	Anatoli Gospodinov	0	0	0	0	0	0
5	DF	(Colombia) COL	Rafa Pérez	17	1	16	1	1	0
7	MF	(Portugal) POR	Diogo Viana	19	5	15+3	5	1	0
8	MF	(Bulgaria) BUL	Boris Galchev	8	0	6+2	0	0	0
9	FW	(Bulgaria) BUL	Preslav Yordanov	11	3	9+2	3	0	0
13	MF	(Bulgaria) BUL	Yordan Yordanov	0	0	0	0	0	0
14	MF	(Bulgaria) BUL	Samir Ayass	4	0	0+4	0	0	0
20	FW	(Bulgaria) BUL	Stanislav Malamov	4	0	2+2	0	0	0
21	MF	(Bulgaria) BUL	Ivan Minchev	1	0	0+1	0	0	0
24	DF	(Bulgaria) BUL	Lazar Marin	1	0	0	0	1	0
25	FW	(Colombia) COL	Wilmar Jordán	4	0	1+2	0	1	0
27	FW	(Bulgaria) BUL	Georgi Minchev	0	0	0	0	0	0

As of 31 May 2017

== Players in/out ==
=== Summer transfers ===
In: Note: Flags indicate national team as defined under FIFA eligibility rules; some limited exceptions apply. Players may hold more than one non-FIFA nationality.

No.	Pos.	Nation	Player
2	DF	BUL	Stoycho Atanasov (from Litex Lovech)
3	DF	BUL	Anton Nedyalkov (from Litex Lovech)
5	DF	COL	Rafa Pérez (from Litex Lovech)
6	MF	BUL	Krasimir Stanoev (from Litex Lovech)
6	MF	POR	Rúben Pinto (loan from (Portugal) Belenenses)
7	MF	POR	Diogo Viana (from Litex Lovech)
10	MF	POR	Arsénio (from Litex Lovech)
11	DF	BUL	Stanislav Manolev (from (Russia) Kuban Krasnodar)
12	GK	BUL	Georgi Kitanov (from Cherno More Varna)
15	MF	BUL	Kristiyan Malinov (from Litex Lovech)
17	MF	POR	David Simão (from (Portugal) Arouca)
18	MF	BUL	Aleksandar Georgiev (from Litex Lovech)
19	FW	BUL	Kiril Despodov (from Litex Lovech)
20	MF	CMR	Petrus Boumal (from Litex Lovech)
21	MF	BUL	Ivan Minchev (from Montana)
21	FW	POR	Rui Pedro (from (Portugal) Académica)
22	MF	BUL	Nikola Kolev (from Litex Lovech)
23	DF	BUL	Aleksandar Dyulgerov (from Pirin Blagoevgrad)
24	DF	BUL	Lazar Marin (from Botev Plovdiv)
25	FW	COL	Wilmar Jordán (from (China) Tianjin Teda)
26	MF	COL	Gustavo Culma (from Litex Lovech)
27	FW	BUL	Georgi Minchev (from Litex Lovech)
28	DF	BUL	Plamen Galabov (from Litex Lovech)
29	FW	BUL	Milcho Angelov (from Litex Lovech)
30	GK	BUL	Aleksandar Konov (from Litex Lovech)
31	MF	BUL	Rumen Rumenov (from Litex Lovech)
—	FW	USA	Bjørn Johnsen (from Litex Lovech)

Out: Note: Flags indicate national team as defined under FIFA eligibility rules; some limited exceptions apply. Players may hold more than one non-FIFA nationality.

No.	Pos.	Nation	Player
3	DF	BUL	Kiril Dinchev (retired)
5	DF	BUL	Nikolay Dichev (to Lokomotiv Gorna Oryahovitsa)
6	DF	BUL	Aleksandar Branekov (to Slavia Sofia)
6	MF	BUL	Krasimir Stanoev (to CSKA Sofia II)
7	MF	BUL	Momchil Tsvetanov (to Vereya Stara Zagora)
10	MF	BUL	Aleksandar Aleksandrov (to Neftochimic Burgas)
11	MF	BUL	Pavel Golovodov (to CSKA Sofia II)
12	GK	BUL	Stoyan Kolev (to Neftochimic Burgas)
13	MF	BUL	Yordan Yordanov (to Neftochimic Burgas)
14	MF	BUL	Samir Ayass (to Dunav Ruse)
16	MF	BUL	Petar Vitanov (to CSKA Sofia II)
17	DF	BUL	Milen Kikarin (to Botev Plovdiv)
18	MF	BUL	Aykut Ramadan (to CSKA Sofia II)
19	MF	BUL	Mario Yordanov (to Slavia Sofia)
19	DF	BUL	Valentin Antov (to CSKA Sofia II)
20	FW	BUL	Stanislav Malamov (to Neftochimic Burgas)
21	MF	BUL	Ivan Minchev (loan to Slavia Sofia)
21	DF	BUL	Viktor Raychev (released)
22	MF	BUL	Nikolay Tsvetkov (to Etar Veliko Tarnovo)
24	FW	BUL	Kostadin Hazurov (to Neftochimic Burgas)
25	DF	BUL	Angel Granchov (to Neftochimic Burgas)
25	FW	COL	Wilmar Jordán (released)
27	FW	BUL	Georgi Minchev (to CSKA Sofia II)
29	FW	BUL	Milcho Angelov (to CSKA Sofia II)
31	MF	BUL	Rumen Rumenov (loan to Neftochimic Burgas)
—	FW	BUL	Emil Petrov (loan to Spartak Pleven)
—	FW	USA	Bjørn Johnsen (to (Scotland) Heart of Midlothian)

=== Winter transfers ===
In: Note: Flags indicate national team as defined under FIFA eligibility rules; some limited exceptions apply. Players may hold more than one non-FIFA nationality.

No.	Pos.	Nation	Player
7	FW	ECU	Kevin Mercado (on loan from (Spain) Granada)
8	FW	CGO	Kévin Koubemba (from (Belgium) Sint-Truidense)
9	FW	BRA	Fernando Karanga (from (South Korea) Jeju United, previously on loan at (Brazil) Paraná Clube)
14	DF	BUL	Nikolay Bodurov (free agent)
24	MF	BUL	Rumen Rumenov (loan return from Neftochimic Burgas)

Out: Note: Flags indicate national team as defined under FIFA eligibility rules; some limited exceptions apply. Players may hold more than one non-FIFA nationality.

No.	Pos.	Nation	Player
1	GK	BUL	Anatoli Gospodinov (to (Poland) Chrobry Głogów)
5	DF	COL	Rafa Pérez (to (Colombia) Atlético Junior)
7	MF	POR	Diogo Viana (to (Portugal) Belenenses)
8	MF	BUL	Boris Galchev (to Septemvri Sofia)
9	FW	BUL	Preslav Yordanov (to (Kazakhstan) Ordabasy)
11	MF	BUL	Pavel Golovodov (to Botev Vratsa)
24	DF	BUL	Lazar Marin (to Botev Plovdiv)

== Pre-season and friendlies ==
Win Draw Loss Fixtures

=== Pre-season ===
24 June 2016	CSKA	0–1	Spartak Pleven	Teteven
18:00 EEST		Report	Dolapchiev 57'	Stadium: Stadion Georgi Benkovski; Attendance: 2,000

2 July 2016	CSKA (Bulgaria)	1–0	(Poland) Legia Warszawa	Jenbach, Austria
19:00 EEST	Arsénio 13'	Report		Stadium: Stadion Jenbach; Referee: Walter Altmann

7 July 2016	CSKA (Bulgaria)	2–5	(Russia) Krasnodar	Mittersill, Austria
19:15 EEST	Culma 13'; Despodov 24' (pen.)	Report	Wánderson 28'; Ari 49' (pen.), 51', 74'; Laborde 85' (pen.)	Stadium: Sportplatz Mittersill

10 July 2016	CSKA (Bulgaria)	0–3	(Ukraine) Dynamo Kyiv	Schwaz, Austria
18:00 EEST		Report	González 47'; Sydorchuk 59'; Yarmolenko 76'	Stadium: Silberstadt-Arena Schwaz

14 July 2016	CSKA (Bulgaria)	2–1	(Italy) Internazionale	Riscone di Brunico, Italy
19:00 EEST	Arsénio 10'; P. Yordanov 55'	Report	Palacio 14'	Stadium: Sportzone Reiperting

23 July 2016	CSKA (Bulgaria)	0–0	(Italy) Udinese	Sofia
18:00 EEST		Report		Stadium: Stadion Balgarska Armiya; Attendance: 10,419; Referee: Nikola Popov (Sofia)

=== On-season (autumn) ===
8 October 2016	CSKA (Bulgaria)	4–0	(North Macedonia) Pelister	Sofia
17:00 EEST	Arsénio 17' (pen.); Culma 26'; Pedro 28'; Viana 56'	Report		Stadium: Stadion Balgarska Armiya; Referee: Petar Dorovski (Sofia)

12 November 2016	CSKA	1–0	Tsarsko Selo	Sofia
15:00 EET	Pinto 20'	Report		Stadium: Tsarsko Selo Complex

12 November 2016	CSKA (Bulgaria)	2–0	(North Macedonia) Horizont	Sofia
16:00 EET	Angelov 19', 33'	Report		Stadium: Tsarsko Selo Complex

=== Mid-season ===
22 January 2017	CSKA (Bulgaria)	2–1	(Russia) Lokomotiv Moscow	Sotogrande, Spain
17:00 EET	Pedro 53'; T. Yordanov 85'	Report	N'Dinga 51'	Stadium: Ayala Polo Club

26 January 2017	CSKA (Bulgaria)	2–4	(Russia) Rubin Kazan	Sotogrande, Spain
13:00 EET	Manolev 24'; Pedro 32'	Report	Jonathas 34'; Ozdoyev 41'; Akhmetov 71'; Caktaš 88'	Stadium: Ayala Polo Club

30 January 2017	CSKA (Bulgaria)	2–2	(Ukraine) Dynamo Kyiv	Marbella, Spain
13:00 EET	Pedro 4'; Despodov 90+3' (pen.)	Report	Buyalskyi 36'; González 38'	Stadium: Marbellla Football Center

1 February 2017	CSKA (Bulgaria)	0–4	(South Korea) Suwon Bluewings	La Línea, Spain
17:00 EET		Report	Johnathan 8'; Santons 54'; Yeom Ki-hun 80'; Park Gi-dong 87'	Stadium: Estadio Municipal

3 February 2017	CSKA (Bulgaria)	0–1	(Denmark) SønderjyskE	La Línea, Spain
17:00 EET		Report	Jakobsen 69'	Stadium: Estadio Municipal

11 February 2017	CSKA (Bulgaria)	8–1	(North Macedonia) Shkëndija	Sofia
13:00 EET	Pérez 25'; Dyulgerov 27'; Karanga 33'; Pedro 37', 40'; Pinto 38'; Despodov 67'; Mercado 73'	Report	Ibraimi 16'	Stadium: Stadion Balgarska Armiya; Attendance: 3,000

=== On-season (spring) ===
24 March 2017	CSKA	2–0	Montana	Sofia
14:00 EET	Culma 11'; Dyulgerov 64'	Report		Stadium: Pancharevo Sport Complex

== Competitions ==
=== Parva Liga ===
==== Regular season ====
===== League table =====
Pos	Team	Pld	W	D	L	GF	GA	GD	Pts	Qualification
1	Ludogorets Razgrad	26	21	4	1	69	19	+50	67	Qualification for the championship round
2	Levski Sofia	26	15	6	5	38	17	+21	51	Qualification for the championship round
3	CSKA Sofia	26	13	7	6	35	16	+19	46	Qualification for the championship round
4	Cherno More	26	12	7	7	30	24	+6	43	Qualification for the championship round
5	Lokomotiv Plovdiv	26	10	9	7	35	30	+5	39	Qualification for the championship round

Source: Bulgarian Football Union, Soccerway
Rules for classification: 1) Points; 2) Head-to-head points; 3) Head-to-head goal difference; 4) Head-to-head goals scored; 5) Head-to-head away goals scored (only if two teams); 6) Goal difference; 7) Goals scored; 8) Fairplay ranking; 9) Draw.

===== Results summary =====
Overall								Home						Away					
Pld	W	D	L	GF	GA	GD	Pts	W	D	L	GF	GA	GD	W	D	L	GF	GA	GD
26	13	7	6	35	16	+19	46	8	3	2	23	7	+16	5	4	4	12	9	+3

Last updated: 1 April 2017.
Source: See results

===== Results by round =====
Round	1	2	3	4	5	6	7	8	9	10	11	12	13	14	15	16	17	18	19	20	21	22	23	24	25	26
Ground	H	A	H	A	H	A	H	H	A	H	A	H	A	A	H	A	H	A	H	A	A	H	A	H	A	H
Result	W	L	W	D	W	L	W	W	D	D	W	L	L	W	D	W	W	D	W	W	W	D	L	W	D	L
Position	2	3	3	5	3	6	4	4	4	4	3	4	5	3	5	3	3	3	3	3	3	3	3	3	3	3

Source: See Results
A = Away; H = Home; W = Win; D = Draw; L = Loss

===== Results =====
29 July 2016 1	CSKA	2–0	Slavia	Sofia
21:15 EEST	Viana 57', 78'; Malinov (yellow card) 59'; Atanasov (yellow card) 64'; P. Yordanov (yellow card) 71'	Report	Yomov (yellow card) 55'; Branekov (yellow card) 60'	Stadium: Stadion Balgarska Armiya; Attendance: 6,880; Referee: Nikola Popov (Sofia)

6 August 2016 2	Vereya	1–0	CSKA	Stara Zagora
19:00 EEST	Soukouna 5'; Angelov (yellow card) 57'; Elias (yellow card) 71'; Kaloyanov (yellow card) 74'	Report	Galabov (yellow card) 39' (yellow-red card) 64'; Arsénio (yellow card) 69'; Nedyalkov (yellow card) 86'	Stadium: Stadion Beroe; Attendance: 3,530; Referee: Stanislav Todorov (Shumen)

14 August 2016 3	CSKA	5–1	Neftochimic	Sofia
21:15 EEST	P. Yordanov 2'; Arsénio 5'; Viana 20', 21'; Chorbadzhiyski 81'; Atanasov (yellow card) 49'	Report	Dyulgerov 53' (o.g.); Ranđelović (yellow card) 4'; Dyulgerov (yellow card) 15'; Pehlivanov (yellow card) 51'	Stadium: Stadion Balgarska Armiya; Attendance: 3,100; Referee: Petar Dorovski (Sofia)

20 August 2016 4	Pirin	1–1	CSKA	Blagoevgrad
19:00 EEST	Blagov 63'; Tasev (yellow card) 42'; Nikolov (yellow card) 44'; Zlatinov (yellow card) 74'; Koštrna (yellow card) 84'; Trayanov (yellow card) 90+1'; K. Kostov (yellow card) 90+2'	Report	Arsénio 54'; Malinov (yellow card) 44'; Galchev (yellow card) 58'; P. Yordanov (yellow card) 81'	Stadium: Stadion Hristo Botev; Attendance: 3,630; Referee: Dragomir Draganov (Varna)

27 August 2016 5	CSKA	2–0	Lokomotiv Gorna Oryahovitsa	Sofia
21:15 EEST	Culma 66'; Chorbadzhiyski 90+5'; Galchev (yellow card) 58'; Kitanov (yellow card) 90+1'; Chorbadzhiyski (yellow card) 90+3'	Report	Atanasov (yellow card) 24' (yellow-red card) 81'; Hristov (yellow card) 26'; Karaneychev (yellow card) 90+2'	Stadium: Stadion Balgarska Armiya; Attendance: 1,750; Referee: Nikola Popov (Sofia)

11 September 2016 6	Dunav	2–0	CSKA	Razgrad
21:15 EEST	Shopov 31'; Ognyanov 33'; Budinov (yellow card) 51'; Lukov (yellow card) 78'; Atanasov (yellow card) 82'	Report	Pérez (yellow card) 46'; Malinov (yellow card) 67'; Chorbadzhiyski (yellow card) 68'; Arsénio (yellow card) 90+1'	Stadium: Ludogorets Arena; Attendance: 5,170; Referee: Stanislav Todorov (Shumen)

18 September 2016 7	CSKA	1–0	Cherno More	Sofia
19:00 EEST	Culma 90+3'; Manolev (yellow card) 23'; Simão (yellow card) 90+5'	Report	Tsvetkov (yellow card) 24'; Bacari (yellow card) 83'; Čanović (yellow card) 89'	Stadium: Stadion Balgarska Armiya; Attendance: 3,000; Referee: Tasko Taskov (Sofia)

25 September 2016 8	CSKA	4–0	Beroe	Sofia
19:00 EEST	Simão 5' (pen.); Culma 9'; Viana 50'; Pedro 81'; Viana (yellow card) 34'; Culma (yellow card) 67'	Report	Milanov (yellow card) 3'; Ivanov (yellow card) 4'; V. Vasilev (yellow card) 47'; Bozhilov (yellow card) 82'	Stadium: Stadion Balgarska Armiya; Attendance: 2,040; Referee: Stanislav Stavrov (Veliko Tarnovo)

1 October 2016 9	Botev	0–0	CSKA	Plovdiv
17:30 EEST	Stoyanov (yellow card) 39'; Nedelev (yellow card) 45+4'; Meledje (yellow card) 45+4'; Sténio (red card) 65'; Zlatkov (yellow card) 75'	Report	Pedro (yellow card) 39'; Simão (red card) 45+3'; Viana (yellow card) 53'; Chorbadzhiyski (yellow card) 89'	Stadium: Futbolen complex Botev 1912; Attendance: 3,350; Referee: Dragomir Draganov (Varna)

15 October 2016 10	CSKA	1–1	Levski	Sofia
16:30 EEST	Yordanov 77' (pen.); Nedyalkov (yellow card) 54'; Boumal (yellow card) 86'; Viana (yellow card) 90+3'	Report	Narh 34'; Adeniji (yellow card) 22'; Procházka (yellow card) 51'; S. Aleksandrov (yellow card) 69'; Jorgačević (yellow card) 76'	Stadium: Natsionalen stadion Vasil Levski; Attendance: 21,000; Referee: Ivaylo Stoyanov (Petrich)

21 October 2016 11	Montana	0–2	CSKA	Lovech
20:00 EEST	Dyakov (yellow card) 46'; Trifonov (yellow card) 76'; Silva (yellow card) 90+2'	Report	Angelov 54', 80'	Stadium: Stadion Lovech; Attendance: 1,200; Referee: Valentin Zhelezov (Burgas)

29 October 2016 12	CSKA	0–1	Lokomotiv Plovdiv	Sofia
17:30 EEST	Pérez (yellow card) 5'; Simão (yellow card) 14'; Pedro (yellow card) 45+1'	Report	Kiki 10'; Krumov (yellow card) 15'; Kotev (yellow card) 24'; El Kharroubi (yellow card) 39'; Raykov (yellow card) 81'; Raynov (yellow card) 88'	Stadium: Stadion Balgarska Armiya; Attendance: 0 Referee: Georgi Dimitrov (Sofia)

5 November 2016 13	Ludogorets	2–1	CSKA	Razgrad
15:00 EET	Wanderson 28'; Moți 62'; Sasha (yellow card) 30'; Wanderson (yellow card) 49'; Cicinho (yellow card) 53'; Keșerü (yellow card) 59'	Report	Culma 90+2'; Pérez (yellow card) 15' (yellow-red card) 71'; Arsénio (yellow card) 32'; Simão (yellow card) 38'; Boumal (yellow card) 55'; Manolev (yellow card) 83'	Stadium: Ludogorets Arena; Attendance: 5,800; Referee: Nikola Popov (Sofia)

19 November 2016 14	Slavia	0–1	CSKA	Sofia
15:00 EET	Pashov (yellow card) 10'; N. Dimitrov (yellow card) 19'; Omar (yellow card) 54'; Serderov (yellow card) 63'; Yomov (yellow card) 64'	Report	Angelov 52'; Manolev (yellow card) 46'; Nedyalkov (yellow card) 68'; Kitanov (yellow card) 80'	Stadium: Natsionalen stadion Vasil Levski; Attendance: 830; Referee: Stanislav Stavrov (Veliko Tarnovo)

27 November 2016 15	CSKA	1–1	Vereya	Sofia
17:45 EET	Boumal 8'	Report	Tsvetanov 65'; Elias (yellow card) 76'	Stadium: Stadion Balgarska Armiya; Attendance: 1,450; Referee: Georgi Davidov (Veliko Tarnovo)

1 December 2016 16	Neftochimic	0–2	CSKA	Burgas
17:30 EET	Dyulgerov (yellow card) 40'; Bozhinov (yellow card) 83'	Report	Pérez 50'; Culma 59'; Arsénio (yellow card) 8'	Stadium: Stadion Lazur; Attendance: 980; Referee: Angel Angelov (Sofia)

4 December 2016 17	CSKA	2–0	Pirin	Sofia
17:30 EET	Yordanov 12'; Angelov 90+3'; Pérez (yellow card) 25'; Culma (yellow card) 80'	Report	Trayanov (yellow card) 77'	Stadium: Stadion Balgarska Armiya; Attendance: 1,100; Referee: Petar Dorovski (Sofia)

11 December 2016 18	Lokomotiv Gorna Oryahovitsa	0–0	CSKA	Gorna Oryahovitsa
15:00 EET	Apostolov (yellow card) 17'; Kifouéti (yellow card) 60'; Zhelev (yellow card) 90+5'	Report	Boumal (yellow card) 44'; Yordanov (yellow card) 73'; Kolev (yellow card) 81'; Chorbadzhiyski (yellow card) 90+5'	Stadium: Stadion Lokomotiv; Attendance: 8,000; Referee: Ivaylo Stoyanov (Petrich)

16 December 2016 19	CSKA	3–0	Dunav	Sofia
17:30 EET	Pinto 59'; Chorbadzhiyski 88'; Dyulgerov 90+3'; Yordanov (penalty missed) 19'; Kitanov (yellow card) 8'; Kolev (yellow card) 61'; Chorbadzhiyski (yellow card) 83'; Boumal (yellow card) 84'	Report	Marem (yellow card) 17'; Petkov (yellow card) 55' (yellow-red card) 85'	Stadium: Stadion Balgarska Armiya; Attendance: 780; Referee: Angel Angelov (Sofia)

19 February 2017 20	Cherno More	0–2	CSKA	Kavarna
12:30 EET	G. Iliev (yellow card) 18'; Bacari (yellow card) 78'	Report	Pedro 85', 90+1'; Culma (yellow card) 50'	Stadium: Stadion Kavarna; Attendance: 2,550; Referee: Ivaylo Stoyanov (Petrich)

25 February 2017 21	Beroe	0–1	CSKA	Stara Zagora
15:00 EET	Kato (yellow card) 52'; Zehirov (yellow card) 71'; Raynov (yellow card) 86'; Ivanov (yellow card) 90+1'	Report	Pedro 87'	Stadium: Stadion Beroe; Attendance: 4,780; Referee: Dragomir Draganov (Varna)

28 February 2017 22	CSKA	0–0	Botev	Sofia
17:30 EET	Simão (yellow card) 50'; Pinto (yellow card) 84'; Manolev (yellow card) 90+1'	Report	Vutov (yellow card) 20'; Meledje (yellow card) 84' (yellow-red card) 85'; Genev (yellow card) 90+3'	Stadium: Stadion Balgarska Armiya; Attendance: 1,850; Referee: Petar Dorovski (Sofia)

4 March 2017 23	Levski	2–1	CSKA	Sofia
14:30 EET	Procházka 71' (pen.); Jablonský 79'; Adeniji (yellow card) 11'; Krastev (yellow card) 13'; Añete (yellow card) 27'; Bourabia (yellow card) 61'	Report	Arsénio 8'; Pinto (yellow card) 26'; Bodurov (yellow card) 29'; Nedyalkov (yellow card) 45+3'; Karanga (yellow card) 51'; Boumal (yellow card) 56'	Stadium: Natsionalen stadion Vasil Levski; Attendance: 21,000; Referee: Nikola Popov (Sofia)

11 March 2017 24	CSKA	2–1	Montana	Sofia
17:30 EET	Mercado 28'; Despodov 39'; Manolev (yellow card) 76'	Report	Atanasov 88'; Iliev (yellow card) 25'; Igumanović (yellow card) 52'	Stadium: Stadion Balgarska Armiya; Attendance: 650; Referee: Stanislav Stavrov (Veliko Tarnovo)

18 March 2017 25	Lokomotiv Plovdiv	1–1	CSKA	Plovdiv
15:00 EET	Kiki 13'; Kiki (yellow card) 25'; Velkovski (yellow card) 71'; Krumov (yellow card) 72'	Report	Despodov 80'; Boumal (yellow card) 79'; Malinov (yellow card) 86'	Stadium: Stadion Lokomotiv; Attendance: 3,990; Referee: Ivaylo Stoyanov (Petrich)

1 April 2017 26	CSKA	0–2	Ludogorets	Sofia
20:00 EEST	Nedyalkov (yellow card) 28'; Manolev (yellow card) 41'; Pinto (yellow card) 56'; Despodov (yellow card) 57'	Report	Moți 28'; Cafu 41'; Sasha (yellow card) 57'; Wanderson (yellow card) 59'; Keșerü (yellow card) 78'	Stadium: Stadion Balgarska Armiya; Attendance: 8,800; Referee: Stefan Apostolov (Blagoevgrad)

==== Championship round ====
===== League table =====
Pos	Team	Pld	W	D	L	GF	GA	GD	Pts	Qualification
1	Ludogorets Razgrad (C)	36	25	8	3	87	28	+59	83	Qualification for the Champions League second qualifying round
2	CSKA Sofia (Note: On 29 May 2017 a UEFA letter to the Bulgarian Football Union declared that CSKA Sofia were not allowed to compete in European tournaments for the following two seasons as they were considered to have been re-formed as a new club and thus did not pass the "three-year rule". As this decision was appealed by CSKA Sofia, the Bulgarian Football Union granted a license to them subject to legal proceedings. A few hours prior to the Europa League first qualifying round draw, UEFA replaced them by Dunav Ruse, the fourth-placed team of the league.)	36	19	10	7	51	21	+30	67	
3	Levski Sofia (O)	36	18	9	9	50	31	+19	63	Qualification for the European play-off final
4	Dunav Ruse	36	15	10	11	46	44	+2	55	Qualification for the Europa League first qualifying round
5	Lokomotiv Plovdiv	36	14	10	12	50	52	−2	52	
6	Cherno More Varna	36	13	8	15	39	45	−6	47	

Source: Soccerway
Rules for classification: 1) Points; 2) Head-to-head points; 3) Head-to-head goal difference; 4) Head-to-head goals scored; 5) Head-to-head away goals scored (only if two teams); 6) Goal difference; 7) Goals scored; 8) Fairplay ranking; 9) Draw.
(C) Champions; (O) Play-off winners

===== Results summary =====
Overall								Home						Away					
Pld	W	D	L	GF	GA	GD	Pts	W	D	L	GF	GA	GD	W	D	L	GF	GA	GD
10	6	3	1	16	5	+11	21	3	2	0	9	2	+7	3	1	1	7	3	+4

Last updated: 31 May 2017.
Source: See results

===== Results by round =====
Round	1	2	3	4	5	6	7	8	9	10
Ground	H	A	H	A	H	A	H	A	H	A
Result	W	W	D	W	W	W	D	D	W	L
Position	3	3	3	2	2	2	2	2	2	2

Source: See Results
A = Away; H = Home; W = Win; D = Draw; L = Loss

===== Results =====
8 April 2017 27	CSKA	3–1	Cherno More	Sofia
20:00 EEST	Karanga 45', 87'; Despodov 45+1'; Arsénio (yellow card) 25'; Pedro (yellow card) 60'; Chorbadzhiyski (yellow card) 63' (yellow-red card) 75'; Dyulgerov (yellow card) 90'	Report	Kokonov 77'; Stanchev (yellow card) 39'; E. Mihaylov (yellow card) 43'; Trayanov (red card) 60'; Tsvetkov (yellow card) 79'; Nikolov (yellow card) 85'	Stadium: Stadion Balgarska Armiya; Attendance: 1,050; Referee: Nikola Popov (Sofia)

13 April 2017 28	Lokomotiv Plovdiv	1–2	CSKA	Plovdiv
19:30 EEST	Bakalov 36'; Vidanov (yellow card) 34'; Umarbayev (red card) 37'; Trajanov (yellow card) 38'; Kamburov (yellow card) 56'; Kiki (yellow card) 74'; Goranov (yellow card) 90+4'	Report	Bodurov 11'; Culma 71'; Simão (yellow card) 38'; Manolev (yellow card) 61'; Mercado (yellow card) 90+1'	Stadium: Stadion Lokomotiv; Attendance: 2,250; Referee: Stanislav Stavrov (Veliko Tarnovo)

23 April 2017 29	CSKA	1–1	Ludogorets	Sofia
20:00 EEST	Boumal 65' (pen.); Karanga (yellow card) 12'; Boumal (yellow card) 40'; Bodurov (yellow card) 58'	Report	Marcelinho 76'; Marcelinho (yellow card) 64'; Campanharo (yellow card) 68'; Moți (yellow card) 74'	Stadium: Stadion Balgarska Armiya; Attendance: 4,200; Referee: Stefan Apostolov (Blagoevgrad)

29 April 2017 30	Levski	0–3	CSKA	Sofia
17:00 EEST	Bourabia (yellow card) 12' de Nooijer (yellow card) 62'; Narh (yellow card) 65'; Procházka (red card) 90+5'	Report	Arsénio 2'; Despodov 6'; Karanga 53'; Despodov (yellow card) 49'; Simão (yellow card) 63'; Culma (yellow card) 90'; Malinov (red card) 90+5'	Stadium: Natsionalen stadion Vasil Levski; Attendance: 11,200; Referee: Nikola Popov (Sofia)

7 May 2017 31	CSKA	2–0	Dunav	Sofia
20:00 EEST	Karanga 75'; Pinto 90+4'	Report	Nenov (yellow card) 83'; Budinov (yellow card) 88'	Stadium: Stadion Balgarska Armiya; Attendance: 950; Referee: Dragomir Draganov (Varna)

13 May 2017 32	Cherno More	0–1	CSKA	Kavarna
17:30 EEST	Stanchev (yellow card) 63' (yellow-red card) 78'; Kuzma (yellow card) 66'; Georgiev (yellow card) 76'; Palankov (yellow card) 80'	Report	Karanga 81'; Manolev (yellow card) 54'; Chorbadzhiyski (yellow card) 58'; Nedyalkov (yellow card) 90'	Stadium: Stadion Kavarna; Attendance: 1,700; Referee: Nikola Popov (Sofia)

17 May 2017 33	CSKA	0–0	Lokomotiv Plovdiv	Sofia
20:00 EEST	Chorbadzhiyski (yellow card) 17'	Report	Vidanov (yellow card) 41' (yellow-red card) 90+3'; Trajanov (yellow card) 60'; Pirgov (yellow card) 90'	Stadium: Stadion Balgarska Armiya; Attendance: 1,600; Referee: Ivaylo Stoyanov (Petrich)

20 May 2017 34	Ludogorets	1–1	CSKA	Razgrad
20:00 EEST	Dyakov 41'; Anicet (yellow card) 85'	Report	Karanga 63'; Pedro (yellow card) 28'; Chorbadzhiyski (yellow card) 84'; Pinto (yellow card) 88'	Stadium: Ludogorets Arena; Attendance: 4,650; Referee: Angel Angelov (Sofia)

28 May 2017 35	CSKA	3–0	Levski	Sofia
18:30 EEST	Simão 1', 83'; Culma 67'; Malinov (yellow card) 25'; Simão (yellow card) 50'; Culma (yellow card) 72'	Report	Jablonský (yellow card) 24'; S. Aleksandrov (yellow card) 46'	Stadium: Natsionalen stadion Vasil Levski; Attendance: 13,600; Referee: Georgi Kabakov (Plovdiv)

31 May 2017 36	Dunav	1–0	CSKA	Ruse
20:00 EEST	Ayass 70'; Dimov (yellow card) 59'	Report	Malinov (yellow card) 59'	Stadium: Gradski stadion Attendance: 12,200; Referee: Georgi Dimitrov (Sofia)

=== Bulgarian Cup ===
21 September 2016 First round	Lokomotiv Sofia	2–1	CSKA	Sofia
16:00 EEST	Georgiev 6'; Hristov 71'; Lyubenov (yellow card) 83'; Bouzoukis (yellow card) 85'; Peev (red card) 87'	Report	Pedro 54'; Malinov (yellow card) 41'; Jordán (yellow card) 42'; Pérez (yellow card) 45+1' (yellow-red card) 87'	Stadium: Stadion Lokomotiv; Attendance: 960; Referee: Angel Angelov (Sofia)

== See also ==
- PFC CSKA Sofia
