= Georgi Minchev (footballer) =

Bulgarian footballer

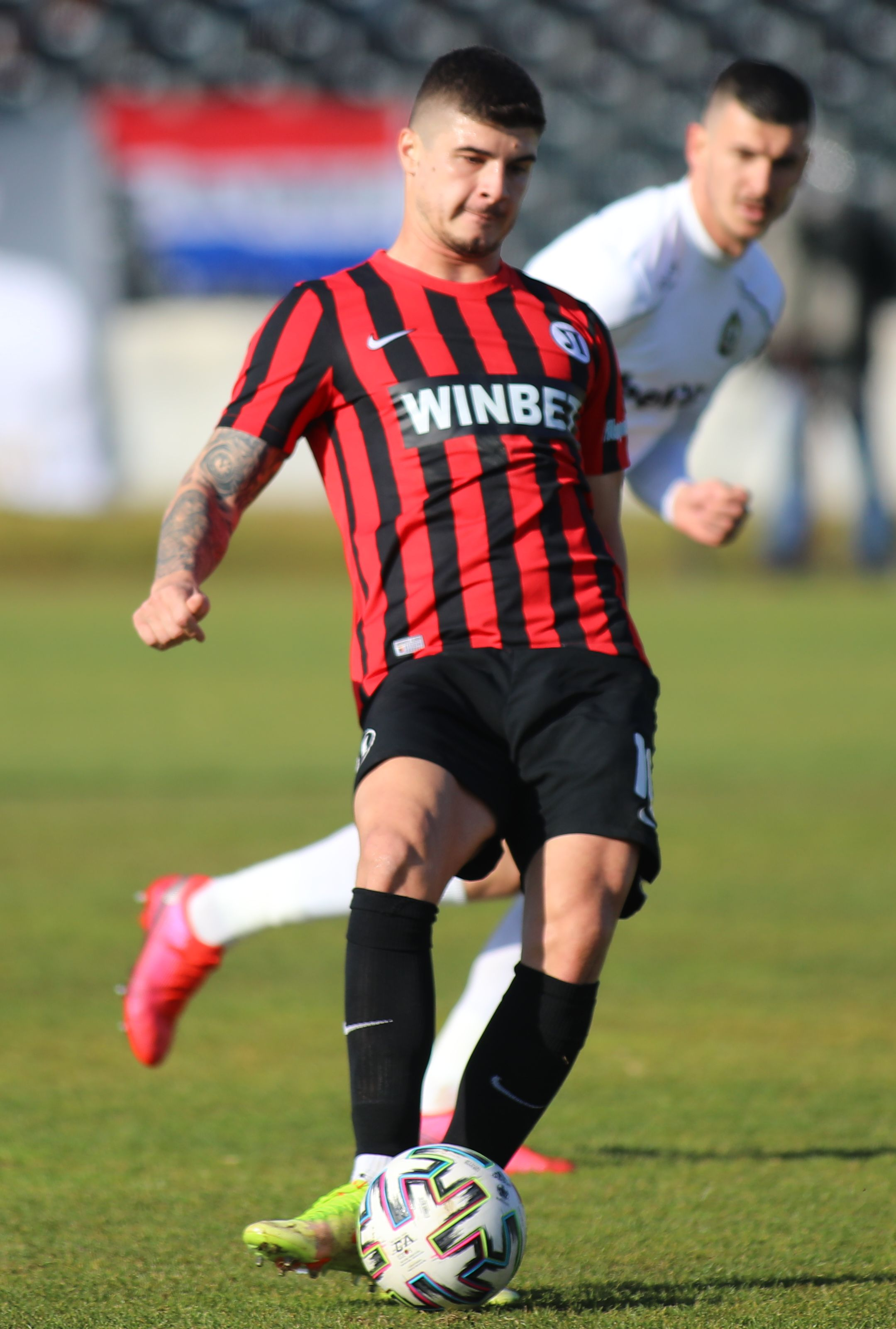

Personal information
- Full name: Georgi Plamenov Minchev
- Date of birth: 20 April 1995 (age 31)
- Place of birth: Ruse, Bulgaria
- Height: 1.84 m (6 ft 0 in)
- Position: Forward

Team information
- Current team: Lokomotiv Sofia
- Number: 10

Youth career
- 2006–2008: Ariston Ruse
- 2008–2013: Litex Lovech

Senior career*
Years	Team	Apps	(Gls)
2013–2016	Litex Lovech	22	(4)
2015–2016	Litex Lovech II	10	(3)
2016	CSKA Sofia II	5	(1)
2016–2018	CSKA Sofia	0	(0)
2017–2018	→ Tsarsko Selo (loan)	34	(8)
2018–2020	Tsarsko Selo	53	(32)
2020–2022	Lokomotiv Plovdiv	49	(18)
2022–2023	Riga	16	(1)
2022–2023	→ Auda (loan)	23	(3)
2023	Lokomotiv Plovdiv	20	(4)
2024	AEL Limassol	20	(11)
2024–2025	Ümraniyespor	18	(6)
2025	Manisa	17	(5)
2025–	Lokomotiv Sofia	29	(4)

International career^{‡}
2011–2012	Bulgaria U17	6	(0)
2013–2015	Bulgaria U19	5	(0)
2015–2016	Bulgaria U21	9	(2)
2021–	Bulgaria	13	(1)
- * Club domestic league appearances and goals as of 11 June 2026 ‡ National team caps and goals as of 23:00, 15 October 2024 (UTC)

Georgi Plamenov Minchev (Bulgarian: Георги Пламенов Минчев; born 20 April 1995) is a Bulgarian professional footballer who plays as a forward for First League club Lokomotiv Sofia.

He started playing with Litex Lovech, signing with CSKA Sofia after three seasons and being loaned to Tsarsko Selo Sofia in early 2017. In June 2018, he moved to the latter club on a permanent deal. After his contract with Tsarsko Selo expired, Minchev joined Lokomotiv Plovdiv in July 2020 on free transfer.

== Club career ==
=== Litex Lovech ===
Minchev made his professional debut on 6 November 2013 in a Bulgarian Cup game against Sozopol, coming on as a substitute in the 83rd minute. Litex won the game 2–1. On 11 December, he made his A PFG debut in a 0–0 home draw against CSKA Sofia, coming on in the 1st minute of injury time as a substitute for Wilmar Jordán. Three days later, Minchev scored his first goal during the 5–2 away league win over Lokomotiv Plovdiv.

He became a top goalscorer in the Bulgarian U21 League for 2014–15 season with 18 goals for Litex U21. For the 2015–16 season he was able also for Litex II playing in B Group. He made his debut for the team on 26 July 2015 in a match against Dobrudzha. He scored his debut 2 goals for the team in a match against Spartak Pleven on 24 August 2015.

=== CSKA Sofia ===
==== Tsarsko Selo (loan) ====
On 17 February 2017, Minchev was loaned to Tsarsko Selo until the end of the season. On 27 May 2017 he scored a hat-trick in the last match of the season against Botev Vratsa. Minchev became captain of the team.

=== Lokomotiv Plovdiv ===
Minchev joined Lokomotiv Plovdiv in July 2020.

=== Riga ===
Minchev joined Riga in February 2022.

== International career ==
Minchev received his first call up for the Bulgaria national team on 14 May 2021 for the friendly games against Slovakia, Russia and France between 1 June and 8 June. He made his debut on 1 June 2021 against Slovakia.

=== International goals ===
Scores and results list Bulgaria's goal tally first.

No.	Date	Venue	Opponent	Score	Result	Competition
1	9 June 2022	Victoria Stadium, Gibraltar	Gibraltar	1–0	1–1	2022–23 UEFA Nations League C

== Statistics ==
=== Club ===
As of 10 May 2024

Club	Season	League	League		Cup		Continental		Total	
Club	Season	League	Apps	Goals	Apps	Goals	Apps	Goals	Apps	Goals
Litex Lovech	2013–14	A Group	2	1	1	0	–		3	1
Litex Lovech	2014–15	A Group	11	3	1	1	1	0	13	4
Litex Lovech	2015–16	A Group	9	0	2	2	0	0	11	2
Litex Lovech	Total		22	4	4	3	1	0	27	7
Litex Lovech II	2015–16	B Group	10	3	–		–		10	3
CSKA Sofia	2016–17	First League	0	0	0	0	–		0	0
CSKA Sofia II	2016–17	Second League	5	1	–		–		5	1
Tsarsko Selo (loan)	2016–17	Second League	12	4	–		–		12	4
Tsarsko Selo (loan)	2017–18	Second League	22	4	2	2	–		24	6
Tsarsko Selo	2018–19	Second League	28	29	1	1	–		29	30
Tsarsko Selo	2019–20	First League	25	3	1	1	–		26	4
Tsarsko Selo	Total		87	40	4	4	0	0	91	44
Lokomotiv Plovdiv	2020–21	First League	30	9	4	1	2	1	36	11
Lokomotiv Plovdiv	2021–22	First League	19	10	2	3	4	0	25	13
Lokomotiv Plovdiv	Total		49	19	6	4	2	1	61	24
Riga	2022	Latvian Higher League	16	1	0	0	0	0	16	1
Auda (loan)	2022	Latvian Higher League	13	3	3	2	–		16	5
Auda (loan)	2023	Latvian Higher League	10	0	0	0	–		10	0
Auda (loan)	Total		23	3	3	2	0	0	26	5
Lokomotiv Plovdiv	2023–24	First League	20	4	2	1	–		22	5
AEL Limassol	2023–24	Cypriot First Division	19	11	1	1	–		20	12
Career total			251	86	20	15	7	1	278	102

=== International ===
As of match played 15 October 2024

Appearances and goals by national team and year
National team	Year	Apps	Goals
Bulgaria	2021	4	0
Bulgaria	2022	5	1
Bulgaria	2023	0	0
Bulgaria	2024	4	0
Total		13	1

== Honours ==
=== Club ===
Lokomotiv Plovdiv

- Bulgarian Supercup: 2020
