= Kiril Despodov =

Bulgarian footballer (born 1996)

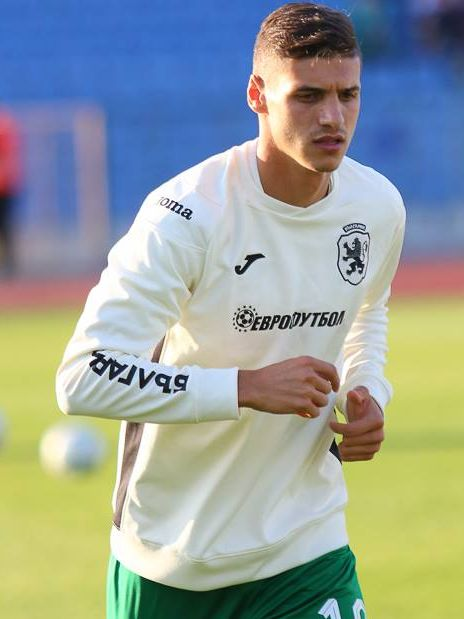
- Despodov warming up for Bulgaria in October 2018

Personal information
- Full name: Kiril Vasilev Despodov
- Date of birth: 11 November 1996 (age 29)
- Place of birth: Kresna, Bulgaria
- Height: 1.80 m (5 ft 11 in)
- Position: Winger

Team information
- Current team: PAOK
- Number: 77

Youth career
- 2008–2015: Litex Lovech

Senior career*
Years	Team	Apps	(Gls)
2012–2016	Litex Lovech	37	(4)
2015–2016	Litex Lovech II	13	(2)
2016	CSKA Sofia II	1	(0)
2016–2019	CSKA Sofia	71	(20)
2019–2021	Cagliari	5	(0)
2019–2020	→ Sturm Graz (loan)	19	(8)
2020–2021	→ Ludogorets Razgrad (loan)	20	(5)
2021–2023	Ludogorets Razgrad	59	(22)
2023–	PAOK	76	(19)

International career^{‡}
2012–2013	Bulgaria U17	9	(5)
2012–2015	Bulgaria U19	17	(5)
2015–2018	Bulgaria U21	20	(8)
2017–	Bulgaria	60	(15)
- * Club domestic league appearances and goals as of 22 March 2026 ‡ National team caps and goals as of 18 November 2025

Kiril Vasilev Despodov (Bulgarian: Кирил Василев Десподов; born 11 November 1996) is a Bulgarian professional footballer who plays primarily as a winger for Super League Greece club PAOK and the Bulgaria national team, which he captains.

Despodov made his way through the youth teams at Litex Lovech before making his senior debut in 2012 at the age of 15. He became part of CSKA Sofia in June 2016, where he established himself as the team's star player, winning the Bulgarian Footballer of the Year award in 2018 – the first CSKA player to do so since Hristo Stoichkov in 1989. He won it for second time in 2021, and again in 2022.

On 23 March 2018, Despodov made his senior international debut for Bulgaria in a 1–0 friendly loss against Bosnia and Herzegovina.

== Club career ==
=== Litex Lovech ===
Despodov was born in Kresna and made his first steps in football in the local team Perun's Academy. He joined Litex Lovech's Academy at the age of 12 and progressed through the club's youth system. He played an important role in Litex's 2012 BFU U-16 Cup win, scoring two goals in the final against Cherno More on 26 April.

Despodov made his first team debut under Hristo Stoichkov's management, at 15 years 183 days, in a 5–0 league win over Kaliakra Kavarna on 12 May 2012, coming on as a substitute for Svetoslav Todorov. He scored his first goal on 10 August 2013, netting the fifth in a 5–1 away league win over Pirin Gotse Delchev.

On 22 November 2014, Despodov scored his first goal of the 2014–15 season against Cherno More in a 3–0 away win. On 27 November, he signed his first professional contract with Litex shortly after turning 18. Two days later he scored his second goal of the season in a 2–2 away draw against Levski Sofia in the 66th minute to clinch a point for his team.

Despite the not so good start of the season 2015–16 for Despodov, as he played only in 4 matches from 19 rounds, he became a hero in the quarterfinals of the Bulgarian Cup. In the match against Levski Sofia, after coming on as a substitute in the 76th minute when the match was 0–0 and Litex was down to 10 people, they eventually ended up winning the game after extra time 3–0, with Despodov scoring 2 of the goals.

=== CSKA Sofia ===
He joined CSKA Sofia in the summer of 2016. On 29 April 2017, Despodov scored his first goal in The Eternal Derby, netting the second in CSKA Sofia's 3–0 win over Levski Sofia in a First Professional Football League match. Remaining with the club until January 2019 and becoming popular with the fans of the "redmen", Despodov later began receiving a frosty reception from many of them as a result of becoming part of the ranks of league rivals Ludogorets Razgrad in 2020. On 30 April 2023, a decisive league match between CSKA Sofia and Ludogorets Razgrad had to be temporarily halted after Despodov was unable to take a corner kick as a result of objects being thrown at him by CSKA supporters.

=== Cagliari ===
On 30 January 2019, Despodov completed a transfer to Serie A side Cagliari, signing a contract until 2023 with an extension option for one more season. CSKA Sofia did not reveal the exact transfer fee, but it was reported that it broke the record for an outgoing First League transfer of a local Bulgarian player, which until then was Hristo Stoichkov's $4.5 million move to Barcelona in the summer of 1990. He made his debut for the club in a 3–0 away loss to Milan on 10 February, coming on for Artur Ioniță in the 75th minute.

==== Sturm Graz (loan) ====
On 2 September 2019, Despodov was loaned to Sturm Graz for the 2019–20 season.

=== Ludogorets Razgrad ===
On 5 October 2020, Cagliari announced that Despodov would be loaned to Ludogorets Razgrad with an option to buy. The deal would see him remain at the club for the duration of the 2020–21 campaign.

On 19 June 2021, Ludogorets announced that he had signed permanently with the club. On 12 March 2023, Despodov scored his first hat-trick for Ludogorets in a 3–2 home win over Cherno More in a league match.

=== PAOK ===
On 4 September 2023, Super League Greece club PAOK announced the signing of Despodov on a four-year contract, for a reported fee of €3 million. On 28 January 2024, he scored a brace in a home match against Panathinaikos, securing a 2–1 win.

== International career ==
On 7 February 2015, Despodov made his first appearance for Bulgaria, in a goalless draw with Romania in a non-official friendly match, coming on as a late substitute for Stanislav Manolev. He was also called up in March 2017, for a 2018 World Cup qualifier against the Netherlands, but remained on the bench. Despodov finally made his complete debut for Bulgaria on 23 March 2018 in a friendly match against Bosnia and Herzegovina, replacing Spas Delev shortly after the one hour mark.

On 13 October 2018, he scored his first goal for the national team in a 2–1 home win against Cyprus, in a match for the 2018–19 UEFA Nations League. His second goal came in a 2022 FIFA World Cup qualification against Switzerland national football team. On 29 March 2022, Despodov opened the scoring in the friendly match against Croatia, but was dismissed from the field almost immediately after that due to receiving a second yellow card for taking off his shirt as part of his goal celebration.

== Career statistics ==
=== Club ===
As of match played 22 March 2026

Appearances and goals by club, season and competition
Club	Season	League			National cup (Note: Includes Bulgarian Cup, Austrian Cup, Greek Football Cup)		Europe		Other		Total	
Club	Season	Division	Apps	Goals	Apps	Goals	Apps	Goals	Apps	Goals	Apps	Goals
Litex Lovech	2011–12	A Group	1	0	—		—		—		1	0
Litex Lovech	2012–13	A Group	8	0	1	0	—		—		9	0
Litex Lovech	2013–14	A Group	5	2	4	0	—		—		9	2
Litex Lovech	2014–15	A Group	18	2	3	0	—		—		21	2
Litex Lovech	2015–16	A Group	4	0	5	2	—		—		9	2
Litex Lovech	Total		36	4	13	2	—		—		49	6
Litex Lovech II	2015–16	B Group	13	2	—		—		—		13	2
CSKA Sofia II	2016–17	Second League	1	0	—		—		—		1	0
CSKA Sofia	2016–17	First League	25	4	—		—		—		25	4
CSKA Sofia	2017–18	First League	30	8	3	3	—		—		33	11
CSKA Sofia	2018–19	First League	16	8	1	0	5 (Note: Appearances in UEFA Europa League)	2	—		22	10
CSKA Sofia	Total		71	20	4	3	5	2	—		80	25
Cagliari	2018–19	Serie A	4	0	—		—		—		4	0
Cagliari	2020–21	Serie A	1	0	—		—		—		1	0
Cagliari	Total		5	0	—		—		—		5	0
Sturm Graz (loan)	2019–20	Austrian Bundesliga	19	8	2	1	—		—		21	9
Ludogorets Razgrad	2020–21	First League	20	5	4	0	4	1	—		28	6
Ludogorets Razgrad	2021–22	First League	25	6	2	1	13 (Note: Seven appearances and two goals in UEFA Champions League, six appearances and one goal in UEFA Europa League)	3	1 (Note: Appearance in Bulgarian Supercup)	0	41	10
Ludogorets Razgrad	2022–23	First League	30	14	4	0	13 (Note: Six appearances and two goals in UEFA Champions League, five appearances and one goal in UEFA Europa League, two appearances in UEFA Europa Conference League)	3	1	2	48	19
Ludogorets Razgrad	2023–24	First League	4	2	—		7 (Note: Four appearances and one goal in UEFA Champions League, three appearances and one goal in UEFA Europa League)	2	—		11	4
Ludogorets Razgrad	Total		79	27	10	1	37	9	2	2	128	39
PAOK	2023–24	Super League Greece	33	11	4	0	10 (Note: Appearances in UEFA Europa Conference League)	2	—		47	13
PAOK	2024–25	Super League Greece	25	5	3	0	16 (Note: Four appearances in UEFA Champions League, twelve appearances and three goals in UEFA Europa League)	3	—		44	8
PAOK	2025–26	Super League Greece	18	3	3	1	9	1	—		30	5
PAOK	Total		76	19	10	1	35	6	—		121	26
Career total			300	80	39	8	77	17	2	2	418	107

=== International ===
As of 18 November 2025

National team	Year	Apps	Goals
Bulgaria
Bulgaria	2018	5	1
Bulgaria	2019	7	0
Bulgaria	2020	3	0
Bulgaria	2021	11	2
Bulgaria	2022	9	6
Bulgaria	2023	10	3
Bulgaria	2024	9	3
Bulgaria	2025	6	0
Total		60	15

International goals

Scores and results list Bulgaria's goal tally first.

No.	Date	Venue	Opponent	Score	Result	Competition
1.	13 October 2018	Vasil Levski National Stadium, Sofia, Bulgaria	Cyprus	1–1	2–1	2018–19 UEFA Nations League C
2.	25 March 2021	Vasil Levski National Stadium, Sofia, Bulgaria	Switzerland	1–3	1–3	2022 FIFA World Cup qualification
3.	9 October 2021	LFF Stadium, Vilnius, Lithuania	Lithuania	1–1	1–3	2022 FIFA World Cup qualification
4.	26 March 2022	Education City Stadium, Al Rayyan, Qatar	Qatar	1–1	1–2	Friendly
5.	29 March 2022	Education City Stadium, Al Rayyan, Qatar	Croatia	1–0	1–2	Friendly
6.	2 June 2022	Huvepharma Arena, Razgrad, Bulgaria	North Macedonia	1–0	1–1	2022–23 UEFA Nations League C
7.	23 September 2022	Huvepharma Arena, Razgrad, Bulgaria	Gibraltar	2–1	5–1	2022–23 UEFA Nations League C
8.	26 September 2022	Toše Proeski Arena, Skopje, North Macedonia	North Macedonia	1–0	1–0	2022–23 UEFA Nations League C
9.	16 November 2022	AEK Arena – Georgios Karapatakis, Larnaca, Cyprus	Cyprus	1–0	2–0	Friendly
10.	20 June 2023	Huvepharma Arena, Razgrad, Bulgaria	Serbia	1–0	1–1	UEFA Euro 2024 qualifying
11.	16 November 2023	Vasil Levski National Stadium, Sofia, Bulgaria	Hungary	2–1	2–2	UEFA Euro 2024 qualifying
12.	19 November 2023	Dubočica Stadium, Leskovac, Serbia	Serbia	2–1	2–2	UEFA Euro 2024 qualifying
13.	22 March 2024	Dalga Arena, Baku, Azerbaijan	Tanzania	1–0	1–0	2024 FIFA Series
14.	8 June 2024	Stožice Stadium, Ljubljana, Slovenia	Slovenia	1–0	1–1	Friendly
15.	8 September 2024	Stadion Hristo Botev, Plovdiv, Bulgaria	Northern Ireland	1–0	1–0	2024–25 UEFA Nations League C

== Honours ==
=== Club ===
Ludogorets Razgrad

- Bulgarian First League: 2020–21, 2021–22, 2022–23, 2023–24
- Bulgarian Supercup: 2021, 2022
- Bulgarian Cup: 2022–23

PAOK

- Super League Greece: 2023–24

=== Individual ===
- Bulgarian Footballer of the Year: 2018, 2021, 2022, 2023, 2024
- Bulgarian Youth Footballer of the Year: 2017
- Bulgarian First League top assist provider: 2020–21, 2022–23
- PAOK Player of the Month: January 2024
