= Chavdar Ivaylov =

Bulgarian footballer

Personal information
- Full name: Chavdar Zhelev Ivaylov
- Date of birth: 9 July 1996 (age 30)
- Place of birth: Teteven, Bulgaria
- Height: 1.74 m (5 ft 9 in)
- Position: Midfielder

Team information
- Current team: Etar Veliko Tarnovo
- Number: 10

Youth career
- –2015: Litex Lovech

Senior career*
Years	Team	Apps	(Gls)
2015–2016	Litex Lovech II	17	(5)
2016–2018	Etar Veliko Tarnovo	42	(0)
2019	CSKA 1948	25	(3)
2020–2025	Botev Vratsa	86	(7)
2025	→ Belasitsa Petrich (loan)	15	(2)
2025–	Etar Veliko Tarnovo	32	(4)

International career
2012–2013	Bulgaria U17	5	(2)
2014	Bulgaria U19	2	(0)
2017–2018	Bulgaria U21	7	(0)
- * Club domestic league appearances and goals as of 13 October 2026

Chavdar Ivaylov (Bulgarian: Чавдар Ивайлов; born 9 July 1996) is a Bulgarian professional footballer who plays as a midfielder for Etar Veliko Tarnovo.

== Career ==
=== Litex Lovech ===
Ivaylov began his football career from Litex Lovech Academy. In 2015 he was promoted to Litex Lovech II. He made his debut for the team on 26 July 2016 in match against Dobrudzha Dobrich. A month later he scored his first goal for the club against Spartak Pleven.

=== Etar Veliko Tarnovo ===
In July 2016 Ivaylov moved to the newly promoted to Bulgarian Second League team of Etar Veliko Tarnovo. He made his debut for the team in the league on 6 August 2016 in match against PFC Bansko. The team won the league and promoted to First Professional Football League in the end of the season.

Ivaylov completed his professional debut on 14 July 2017 in the debut league match of the team against Lokomotiv Plovdiv.

=== Botev Vratsa ===
In January 2020, he joined Botev Vratsa.

== International career ==
=== Youth levels ===
Ivaylov was called up for the Bulgaria U21 team on 14 March 2017.

== Career statistics ==
=== Club ===
As of 15 July 2017

Club performance			League		Cup		Continental		Other		Total	
Club	League	Season	Apps	Goals	Apps	Goals	Apps	Goals	Apps	Goals	Apps	Goals
Bulgaria			League		Bulgarian Cup		Europe		Other		Total	
Litex Lovech II	B Group	2015–16	17	5	0	0	–		–		17	5
Etar Veliko Tarnovo	Second League	2016–17	19	0	1	0	–		–		20	0
Etar Veliko Tarnovo	First League	2017–18	1	0	0	0	–		0	0	1	0
Etar Veliko Tarnovo	Total		20	0	1	0	0	0	0	0	21	0
Career statistics			36	5	1	0	0	0	0	0	37	5
