= Manchev =

Manchev (masculine, Bulgarian: Манчев) or Mancheva (feminine, Bulgarian: Манчева) is a Bulgarian surname. Notable people with the surname include:

- Dimitar Manchev (1934–2009), Bulgarian actor
- Georgi Manchev (born 1990), Bulgarian volleyball player
- Lachezar Manchev (born 1989), Bulgarian footballer
- Milen Manchev (born 2001), Bulgarian footballer
- Nikolay Manchev (born 1985), Bulgarian footballer
- Vladimir Manchev (born 1977), Bulgarian footballer
