= Nikola Kolev =

Bulgarian footballer

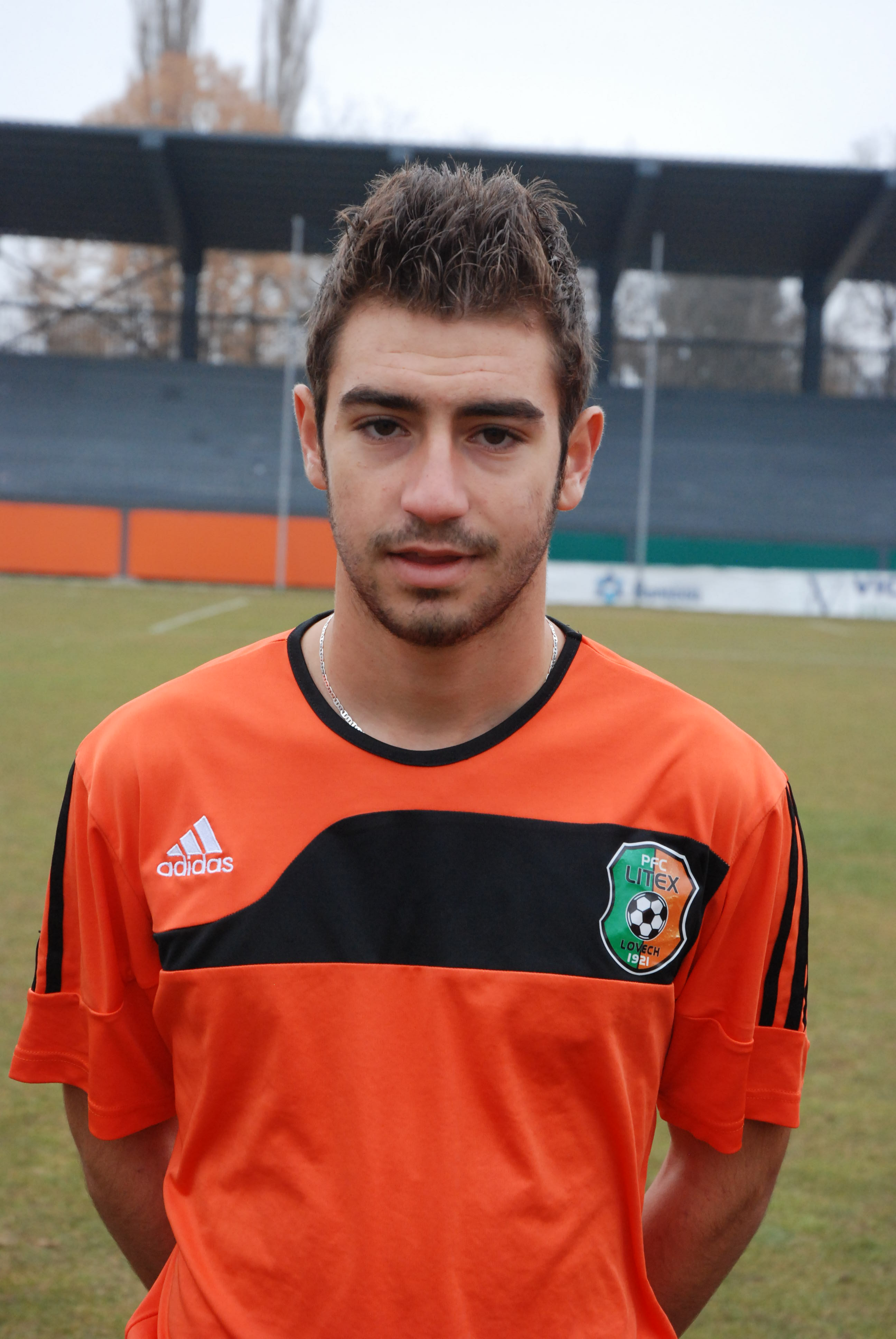

Personal information
- Full name: Nikola Peychev Kolev
- Date of birth: 6 June 1995 (age 31)
- Place of birth: Targovishte, Bulgaria
- Height: 1.70 m (5 ft 7 in)
- Position: Midfielder

Team information
- Current team: Lokomotiv Gorna Oryahovitsa
- Number: 6

Youth career
- 2004–2007: Svetkavitsa
- 2007–2008: Vilafranca
- 2008–2012: Litex Lovech

Senior career*
| Years | Team | Apps | (Gls) |
| 2012–2016 | Litex Lovech | 54 | (0) |
| 2016 | Litex Lovech II | 10 | (1) |
| 2016–2017 | CSKA Sofia II | 19 | (3) |
| 2016–2019 | CSKA Sofia | 11 | (0) |
| 2017–2019 | → Etar (loan) | 46 | (0) |
| 2019–2020 | Etar | 26 | (0) |
| 2020–2021 | Botev Vratsa | 11 | (0) |
| 2021–2022 | Tsarsko Selo | 10 | (0) |
| 2022 | Yantra Gabrovo | 8 | (0) |
| 2022–2024 | Dunav Ruse | 53 | (0) |
| 2024– | Lokomotiv Gorna Oryahovitsa | 37 | (1) |

International career
| 2011–2012 | Bulgaria U17 | 8 | (1) |
| 2012–2014 | Bulgaria U19 | 6 | (1) |
| 2014–2016 | Bulgaria U21 | 11 | (2) |
- * Club domestic league appearances and goals as of 11 June 2026

Nikola Kolev (Bulgarian: Никола Колев; born 6 June 1995) is a Bulgarian footballer who plays as a midfielder for Lokomotiv Gorna Oryahovitsa.

== Career ==
=== Youth career ===
Kolev started his career in Svetkavitsa. In 2007, he joined the Gillette youth academy and he was chosen by Hristo Stoichkov to join him for one year at the academy. After the one year with Vilafranca he chose to join the Bulgarian club Litex Lovech.

=== Litex Lovech ===
He became a champion with elite youth under-19 team of Litex for 2010–2011 season. In end of 2011 he joined in first team from the coach Hristo Stoichkov. Nikola Kolev made his first team debut for Litex Lovech against Levski Sofia on 29 March 2012 at age 16 years, 9 months and 23 days.

=== CSKA Sofia ===
In June 2016 he and big part of the Litex squad moved to CSKA Sofia.

==== Etar ====
On 6 September 2017, Kolev was loaned to Etar Veliko Tarnovo. In June 2018, Kolev started pre-season training with his parent club put subsequently his loan was extended until the end of the year.

== Club statistics ==
=== Club ===
As of 13 September 2020

| Club | Season | Division | League | | Cup | | Europe | | Total | |
| Club | Season | Division | Apps | Goals | Apps | Goals | Apps | Goals | Apps | Goals |
|---|---|---|---|---|---|---|---|---|---|---|
| Litex Lovech | 2011–12 | A Group | 7 | 0 | 0 | 0 | 0 | 0 | 7 | 0 |
| Litex Lovech | 2012–13 | A Group | 5 | 0 | 0 | 0 | – | | 5 | 0 |
| Litex Lovech | 2013–14 | A Group | 5 | 0 | 2 | 1 | – | | 7 | 1 |
| Litex Lovech | 2014–15 | A Group | 20 | 0 | 3 | 2 | 2 | 0 | 25 | 2 |
| Litex Lovech | 2015–16 | A Group | 17 | 0 | 4 | 0 | 2 | 0 | 23 | 0 |
| Litex Lovech | Total | | 54 | 0 | 9 | 3 | 4 | 0 | 67 | 3 |
| Litex Lovech II | 2015–16 | B Group | 10 | 1 | – | | – | | 10 | 1 |
| CSKA Sofia II | 2016–17 | Second League | 19 | 3 | – | | – | | 19 | 3 |
| CSKA Sofia | 2016–17 | First League | 9 | 0 | 0 | 0 | – | | 9 | 0 |
| CSKA Sofia | 2017–18 | First League | 2 | 0 | 0 | 0 | – | | 2 | 0 |
| CSKA Sofia | Total | | 11 | 0 | 0 | 0 | 0 | 0 | 11 | 0 |
| Etar (loan) | 2017–18 | First League | 21 | 0 | 1 | 0 | – | | 22 | 0 |
| Etar (loan) | 2018–19 | First League | 27 | 0 | 0 | 0 | – | | 27 | 0 |
| Etar | 2019–20 | First League | 21 | 0 | 0 | 0 | – | | 21 | 0 |
| Etar | 2020–21 | First League | 5 | 0 | 0 | 0 | – | | 5 | 0 |
| Etar | Total | First League | 74 | 0 | 1 | 0 | – | | 75 | 0 |
| Botev Vratsa | 2020–21 | First League | 0 | 0 | 0 | 0 | – | | 0 | 0 |
| Career Total | | | 166 | 4 | 11 | 3 | 4 | 0 | 181 | 7 |
