= Anton Nedyalkov =

Bulgarian footballer

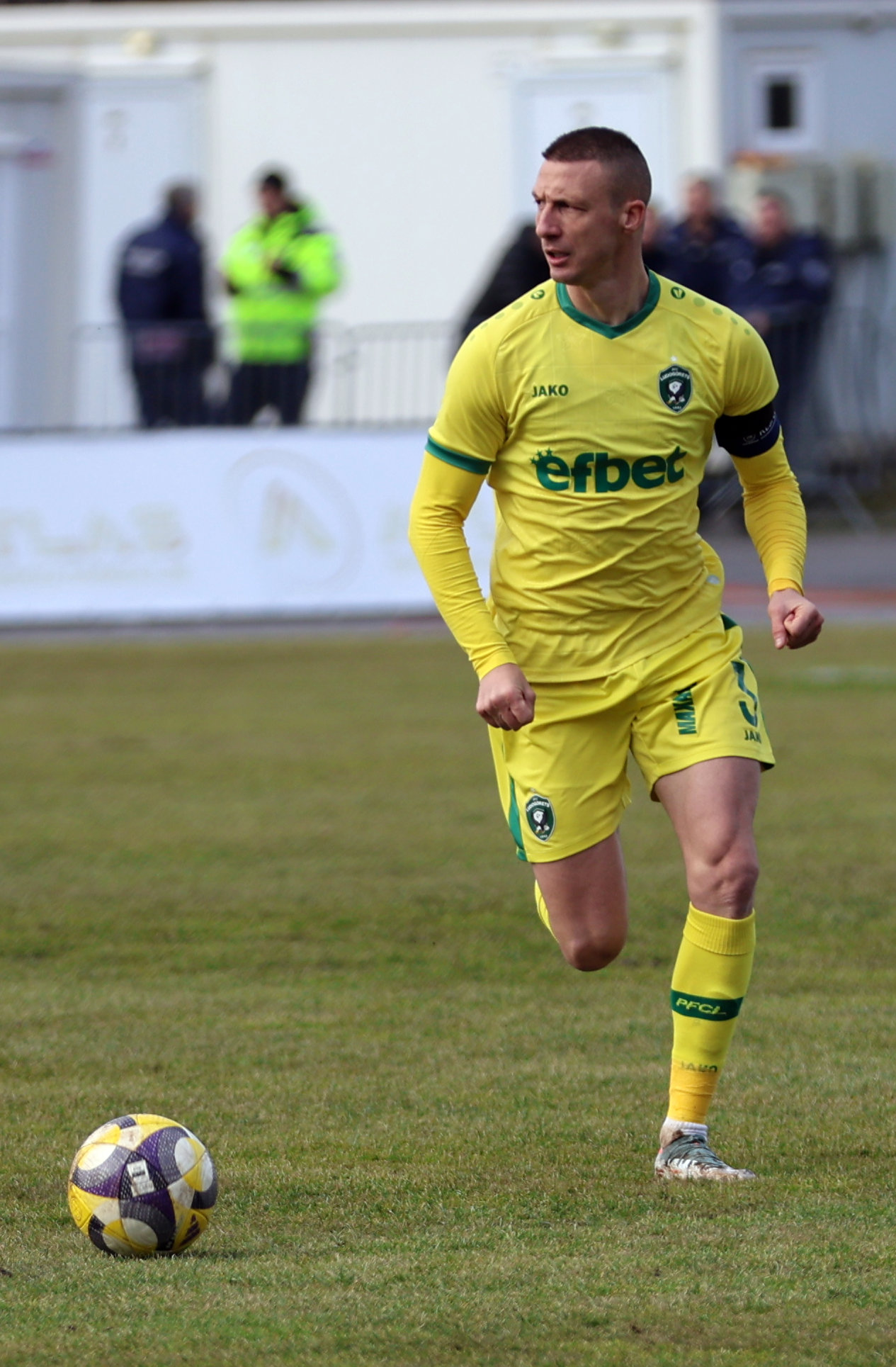

Personal information
- Full name: Anton Mihaylov Nedyalkov
- Date of birth: 30 April 1993 (age 33)
- Place of birth: Lovech, Bulgaria
- Height: 1.81 m (5 ft 11 in)
- Positions: Left-back; centre-back

Team information
- Current team: Ludogorets Razgrad
- Number: 3

Youth career
- 2002–2011: Litex Lovech

Senior career*
Years	Team	Apps	(Gls)
2011–2016	Litex Lovech	72	(0)
2011	→ Chavdar Etropole (loan)	10	(0)
2012	→ Svetkavitsa (loan)	13	(0)
2015–2016	Litex Lovech II	10	(1)
2016–2017	CSKA Sofia	53	(0)
2018	FC Dallas	9	(0)
2018–	Ludogorets Razgrad	162	(2)

International career^{‡}
2011	Bulgaria U19	3	(0)
2012–2014	Bulgaria U21	5	(0)
2016–	Bulgaria	35	(0)
- * Club domestic league appearances and goals as of 9 September 2026 ‡ National team caps and goals as of 7 September 2025

Anton Mihaylov Nedyalkov (Bulgarian: Антон Михайлов Недялков; born 30 April 1993) is a Bulgarian professional footballer who plays as a left-back and centre-back for Ludogorets Razgrad and the Bulgarian national team.

Nedyalkov began his professional career at Litex Lovech in 2011. After loan spells at Chavdar Etropole and Svetkavitsa he became a regular in their team, playing 85 total games for Litex. In June 2016, he joined CSKA Sofia and became an integral member of the team. In December 2017, he briefly signed for Major League Soccer club FC Dallas before joining Ludogorets six months later.

Formerly an international at under-19 and under-21 level, Nedyalkov made his senior international debut for Bulgaria against Luxembourg on 6 September 2016.

== Club career ==
=== Litex Lovech ===
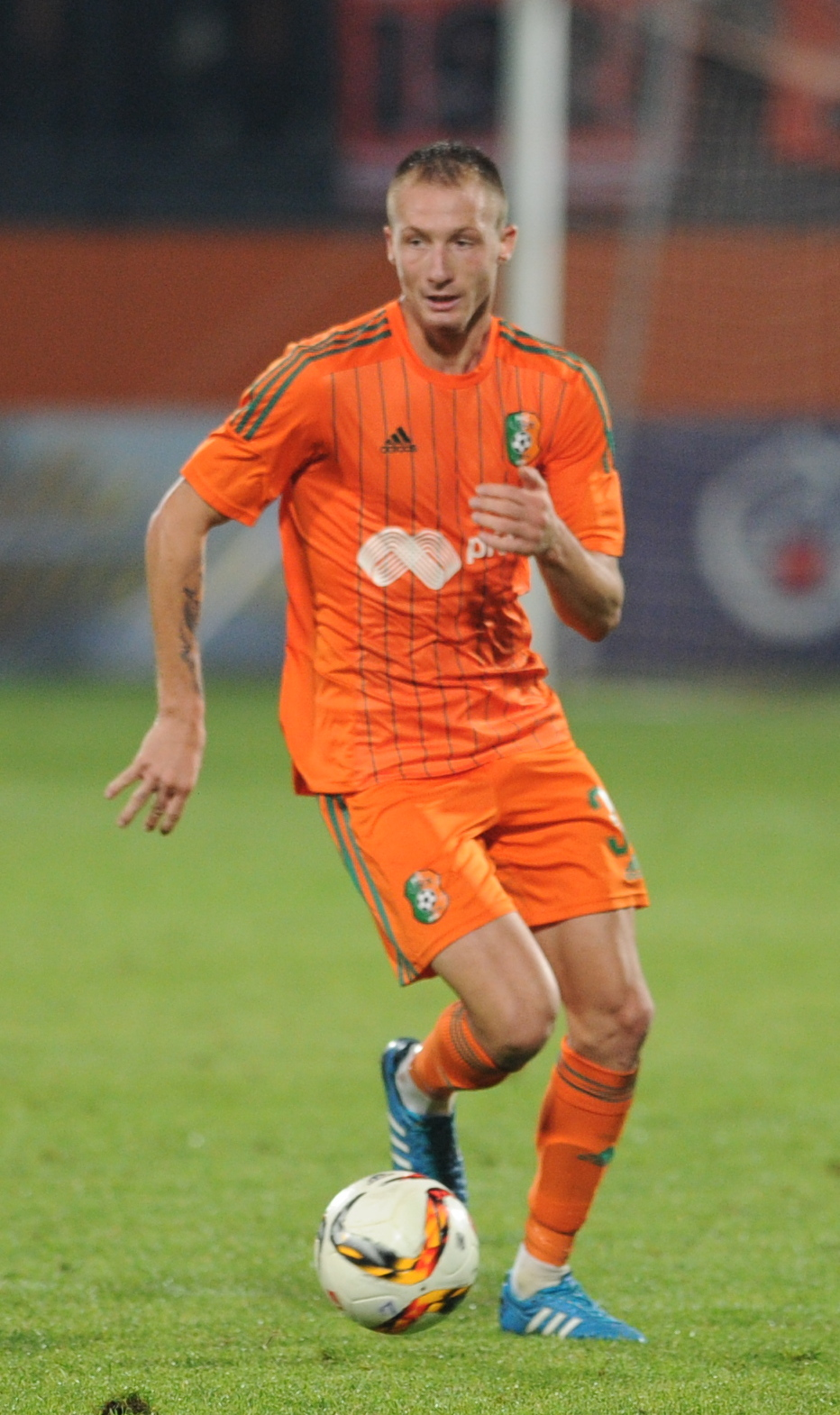
Nedyalkov with Litex in 2015

Nedyalkov joined the first team in 2012 after two loan spells at Chavdar Etropole and Svetkavitsa during the 2011–12 season.

=== CSKA Sofia ===
In June 2016, Nedyalkov joined CSKA Sofia. He made his debut on 29 July, in a 2–0 home win over Slavia Sofia which was also the season opener. In his first season with CSKA, he appeared in 34 of 36 league matches; in 33 of them Nedyalkov played full 90 minutes. After a number of good games he was chosen as the best player of the 2016–17 season by the club's fans.

=== FC Dallas ===
On 21 December 2017, Nedyalkov completed a move to Major League Soccer club FC Dallas for a fee of $1.5 million plus bonuses. He was given the number 6 shirt. Nedyalkov made his league debut in a 3–0 home win at Toyota Stadium against Seattle Sounders FC on 18 March 2018, playing full 90 minutes as a left-back. He assisted Roland Lamah for the third goal in the game.

=== Ludogorets Razgrad ===
On 23 June 2018, after six months in the United States, Dallas announced that Nedyalkov would return to Bulgaria and sign a contract with Bulgarian champions Ludogorets Razgrad for an undisclosed fee. Later that day Ludogorets officially announced the transfer of Nedyalkov, signing with his favorite number 3 shirt.

On 23 June 2021, Nedyalkov was announced as the new captain of the team, after Svetoslav Dyakov left the club. On 12 March 2023, he completed the full 90 minutes in the 3–2 home win over Cherno More in a league match, but it was subsequently revealed that Nedyalkov will have to undergo surgery, which kept him out of action until 22 October 2023 when he played in the 0–0 away draw with Arda. On 22 January 2026, Nedyalkov was on the pitch over the whole duration of the 0–1 away loss against Rangers in a UEFA Europa League match, thus making his 82nd European tournaments appearance for Ludogorets, surpassing former teammate Cosmin Moți. He is also the Bulgarian player with the most matches played for clubs from his home country in European competitions (Nedyalkov has two appearances for Litex Lovech in 2014 under his belt as well).

== International career ==
In 2011, Nedyalkov was a member of Bulgaria U-19 team, playing three games in the qualifying round of U-19 European Championship.

Nedyalkov was called up to the senior Bulgaria team for friendlies against Portugal and Macedonia in March 2016. On 6 September 2016, he made his debut for Bulgaria in a 4–3 2018 World Cup Qualifying victory over Luxembourg.

== Career statistics ==
=== Club ===
As of 9 September 2026

Appearances and goals by club, season and competition
Club	Season	League			Cup (Note: Includes Bulgarian Cup, Bulgarian Supercup and Lamar Hunt U.S. Open Cup.)		Continental (Note: Includes UEFA Europa League and CONCACAF Champions League.)		Other		Total	
Club	Season	Division	Apps	Goals	Apps	Goals	Apps	Goals	Apps	Goals	Apps	Goals
Litex Lovech	2010–11	A Group	0	0	0	0	0	0	0	0	0	0
Litex Lovech	2012–13	A Group	17	0	2	0	–		0	0	19	0
Litex Lovech	2013–14	A Group	19	0	1	0	–		0	0	20	0
Litex Lovech	2014–15	A Group	21	0	4	0	2	0	0	0	27	0
Litex Lovech	2015–16	A Group	15	0	4	0	0	0	0	0	19	0
Litex Lovech	Total		72	0	11	0	2	0	0	0	85	0
Chavdar Etropole (loan)	2011–12	B Group	10	0	0	0	–		0	0	10	0
Svetkavitsa (loan)	2011–12	A Group	13	0	0	0	–		0	0	13	0
Litex Lovech II	2015–16	B Group	10	1	–		–		0	0	10	1
CSKA Sofia	2016–17	Bulgarian First League	34	0	1	0	–		0	0	35	0
CSKA Sofia	2017–18	Bulgarian First League	19	0	1	0	–		0	0	20	0
CSKA Sofia	Total		53	0	2	0	0	0	0	0	55	0
Dallas	2018	MLS	9	0	0	0	1	0	0	0	10	0
Ludogorets Razgrad	2018–19	Bulgarian First League	35	1	1	0	10	0	0	0	46	1
Ludogorets Razgrad	2019–20	Bulgarian First League	26	0	1	0	15	0	1	0	43	0
Ludogorets Razgrad	2020–21	Bulgarian First League	22	0	3	0	8	0	0	0	33	0
Ludogorets Razgrad	2021–22	Bulgarian First League	8	0	1	0	9	1	1	0	19	1
Ludogorets Razgrad	2022–23	Bulgarian First League	16	0	1	0	15	0	1	0	33	0
Ludogorets Razgrad	2023–24	Bulgarian First League	8	1	3	0	3	0	0	0	14	1
Ludogorets Razgrad	2024–25	Bulgarian First League	10	0	4	0	8	0	0	0	22	0
Ludogorets Razgrad	2025–26	Bulgarian First League	31	0	4	0	17	0	1	0	53	0
Ludogorets Razgrad	2026–27	Bulgarian First League	6	0	0	0	2	0	0	0	8	0
Ludogorets Razgrad	Total		162	2	18	0	87	1	4	0	271	3
Career total			329	3	31	0	90	1	4	0	454	4

=== International ===
As of match played 7 September 2025

Appearances and goals by national team and year
National team	Year	Apps	Goals
Bulgaria	2016	2	0
Bulgaria	2017	3	0
Bulgaria	2018	3	0
Bulgaria	2019	6	0
Bulgaria	2020	5	0
Bulgaria	2021	2	0
Bulgaria	2022	7	0
Bulgaria	2023	1	0
Bulgaria	2025	6	0
Total		35	0

== Honours ==
Ludogorets Razgrad

- Bulgarian First League (7): 2018–19, 2019–20, 2020–21, 2021–22, 2022–23, 2023–24, 2024–25
- Bulgarian Cup: (2) 2022–23, 2024–25
- Bulgarian Supercup: (4) 2019, 2021, 2022, 2025

Individual

- Best defender in the Bulgarian First League: 2019
- 2nd place in the Bulgarian Footballer of the Year ranking - 2019
