= Martin Simeonov =

Bulgarian footballer

Personal information
- Full name: Martin Ivanov Simeonov
- Date of birth: 20 January 1998 (age 28)
- Place of birth: Bulgaria
- Position: Defender

Team information
- Current team: Spartak Pleven
- Number: 28

Youth career
- –2016: Litex Lovech

Senior career*
Years	Team	Apps	(Gls)
2015–2016	Litex Lovech II	2	(0)
2016–2017	CSKA Sofia II	11	(0)
2017	CSKA Sofia	1	(0)
2017–2019	Litex Lovech	7	(0)
2020–2021	Levski Karlovo	32	(4)
2021–2022	FC Krumovgrad		
2022–	Spartak Pleven	0	(0)
- * Club domestic league appearances and goals as of 4 July 2022

Martin Simeonov (Bulgarian: Мартин Симеонов; born 20 January 1998) is a Bulgarian footballer who plays as a defender for Spartak Pleven.

== Career ==
=== CSKA Sofia ===
On 31 May 2017 he made his debut for CSKA Sofia in match against Dunav Ruse.

=== Litex Lovech ===
On 14 June 2017 he returned in his youth club Litex Lovech.

=== Krumovgrad ===
In June 2021, Simeonov joined Levski Krumovgrad, where he remained for one year.

== Career statistics ==
=== Club ===
As of 31 May 2017

Club performance			League		Cup		Continental		Other		Total	
Club	League	Season	Apps	Goals	Apps	Goals	Apps	Goals	Apps	Goals	Apps	Goals
Bulgaria			League		Bulgarian Cup		Europe		Other (Note: Includes Bulgarian Supercup matches.)		Total	
Litex Lovech II	B Group	2015–16	2	0	–		–		–		2	0
CSKA Sofia II	Second League	2016–17	11	0	–		–		–		11	0
CSKA Sofia	First League	2016–17	1	0	0	0	—		—		1	0
CSKA Sofia	Total		1	0	0	0	0	0	0	0	1	0
Career statistics			14	0	0	0	0	0	0	0	14	0
