= Gustavo Culma =

Colombian footballer (born 1993)

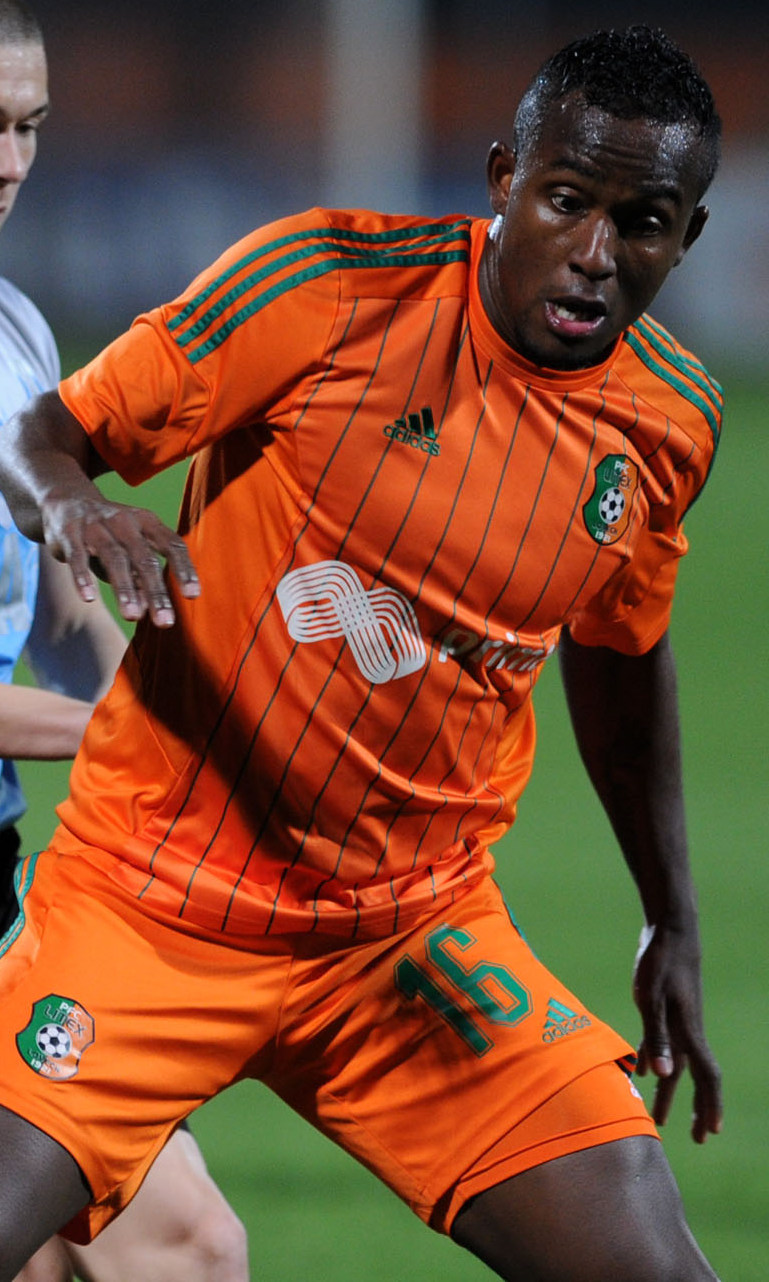
- Culma playing for Litex Lovech in 2016

Personal information
- Date of birth: 20 April 1993 (age 33)
- Place of birth: Ortigal, Colombia
- Height: 1.78 m (5 ft 10 in)
- Position: Winger

Senior career*
Years	Team	Apps	(Gls)
2012–2015	Once Caldas	52	(6)
2016	Litex Lovech II	4	(2)
2016–2017	CSKA Sofia	45	(9)
2018	Necaxa	10	(0)
2018	Correcaminos	5	(1)
- * Club domestic league appearances and goals

Gustavo Culma (born 20 April 1993) is a Colombian former footballer who played as a winger.

== Career ==
Culma began his career with Once Caldas. On 15 January 2016, he joined Bulgarian side Litex Lovech. In January 2018 Culma signed with Club Necaxa that plays in the Mexican Liga MX.

== Statistics ==
As of 12 December 2017

Club performance			League		Cup		Continental		Other		Total	
Club	League	Season	Apps	Goals	Apps	Goals	Apps	Goals	Apps	Goals	Apps	Goals
Colombia			League		Copa Águila		South America		Other (Note: Includes Superliga Colombiana matches.)		Total	
Once Caldas	Liga Águila	2012	13	2	1	0	–		–		14	2
Once Caldas	Liga Águila	2013	1	0	4	0	–		–		5	0
Once Caldas	Liga Águila	2014	25	3	9	1	–		–		34	4
Once Caldas	Liga Águila	2015	13	1	2	0	–		–		15	1
Once Caldas	Total		52	6	16	1	0	0	0	0	68	7
Bulgaria			League		Bulgarian Cup		Europe		Other (Note: Includes Bulgarian Supercup matches.)		Total	
Litex Lovech II	B Group	2015–16	4	2	–		–		–		4	2
Litex Lovech II	Total		4	2	0	0	0	0	0	0	4	2
CSKA Sofia	First League	2016–17	30	7	0	0	–		–		30	7
CSKA Sofia	First League	2017–18	15	2	1	0	–		–		16	2
CSKA Sofia	Total		45	9	1	0	0	0	0	0	46	9
Career statistics			101	17	17	1	0	0	0	0	118	18

== Honours ==
=== Club ===
Necaxa

- Copa MX: Clausura 2018
