= Diogo Viana =

Portuguese footballer (born 1990)

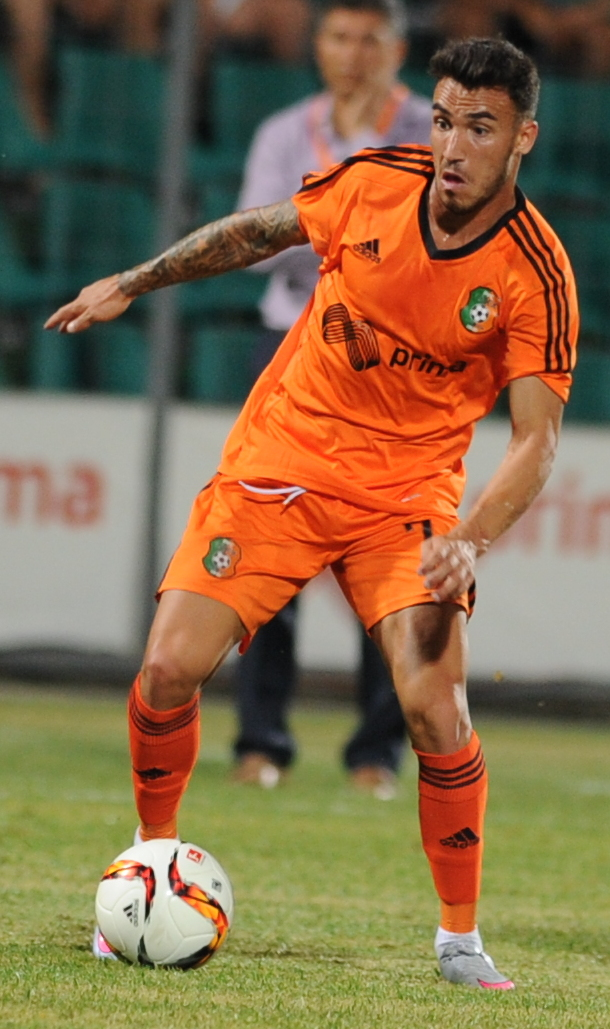
- Viana playing for Litex Lovech in 2015

Personal information
- Full name: Diogo Filipe Guerreiro Viana
- Date of birth: 22 February 1990 (age 36)
- Place of birth: Lagos, Portugal
- Height: 1.74 m (5 ft 9 in)
- Position: Winger

Youth career
- 1999–2000: Burgau
- 2000–2002: Esperança Lagos
- 2002–2008: Sporting CP
- 2008–2009: Porto

Senior career*
Years	Team	Apps	(Gls)
2009–2011	Porto	0	(0)
2009–2010	→ VVV (loan)	33	(1)
2011	→ Aves (loan)	9	(0)
2011–2013	Penafiel	61	(6)
2013–2015	Gil Vicente	59	(4)
2015–2016	Litex Lovech	9	(2)
2016	Litex Lovech II	8	(0)
2016	CSKA Sofia	18	(5)
2017–2018	Belenenses	34	(0)
2018–2019	B-SAD	30	(1)
2019–2020	Braga	6	(0)
2021	Feirense	7	(0)
2021–2022	Argeș Pitești	29	(2)
2022–2023	Farense	6	(0)
2023–2025	Trofense	44	(3)
2025	Anadia	7	(0)

International career
2005–2006	Portugal U16	11	(1)
2007	Portugal U17	5	(1)
2007–2008	Portugal U18	9	(4)
2008–2009	Portugal U19	15	(0)
2010	Portugal U20	4	(0)
2010–2011	Portugal U21	8	(0)
- * Club domestic league appearances and goals as of 2 November 2025

Diogo Filipe Guerreiro Viana (born 22 February 1990) is a Portuguese professional footballer who plays as a right winger.

Developed at Sporting CP and Porto, he played 129 Primeira Liga games for Gil Vicente, Belenenses, B-SAD and Braga, while also having spells abroad in the Netherlands, Bulgaria and Romania.

== Club career ==
Born in Lagos, Algarve, Viana spent six years as a youth at Sporting CP. In June 2008 the 18-year-old was transferred to FC Porto as part of a deal involving Hélder Postiga, with the northerners receiving €2.5 million whereas the Lisbon club retained 50% of his rights. In the 2008–09 season, whilst still a junior, he made his debut with the first team, playing four Taça da Liga matches and totalling 55 minutes in two wins and two losses. His first appearance was against Vitória de Setúbal (2–1 home victory), on 8 January 2009.

On 17 June 2009, Viana moved on loan to VVV-Venlo in the Netherlands. He appeared in 23 Eredivisie games in his first year, helping the Limburg side finish in 12th position. In January 2011, he returned to Portugal and joined C.D. Aves of the Segunda Liga also on loan.

After two years with F.C. Penafiel in the second tier, Viana joined Gil Vicente F.C. of the top flight in 2013. In November that year, he agreed to a new contract to keep him there until 2016, and with a buyout clause of €5 million.

Viana signed with First Professional Football League (Bulgaria) club PFC Litex Lovech in June 2015, after two years in the Primeira Liga with Gil Vicente FC. In the summer of 2016 he joined PFC CSKA Sofia on a free transfer, after the former merged with the latter.

On 31 January 2017, Viana moved to C.F. Os Belenenses for an undisclosed fee. He scored once for the reorganised B-SAD on 11 March 2019, as they came from behind to hold leaders S.L. Benfica to a 2–2 away draw.

After his deal expired, Viana was confirmed as a player for S.C. Braga on 25 June 2019, on a two-year contract. After eight competitive matches, both parties agreed to end his link on 5 October 2020.

Viana signed with C.D. Feirense on 1 February 2021, for free. On 25 June, he moved abroad again, with compatriot João Miguel to FC Argeș Pitești in the Romanian Liga I. His first goal came on the third matchday, earning a 2–2 draw at CS Gaz Metan Mediaș in added time.

On 30 August 2022, Viana returned to his country's second division, on a contract of undisclosed length at S.C. Farense. He played six games in their promotion-winning season, plus three more in cups, before leaving in June.
