= Arsénio Nunes =

Portuguese footballer

Arsénio
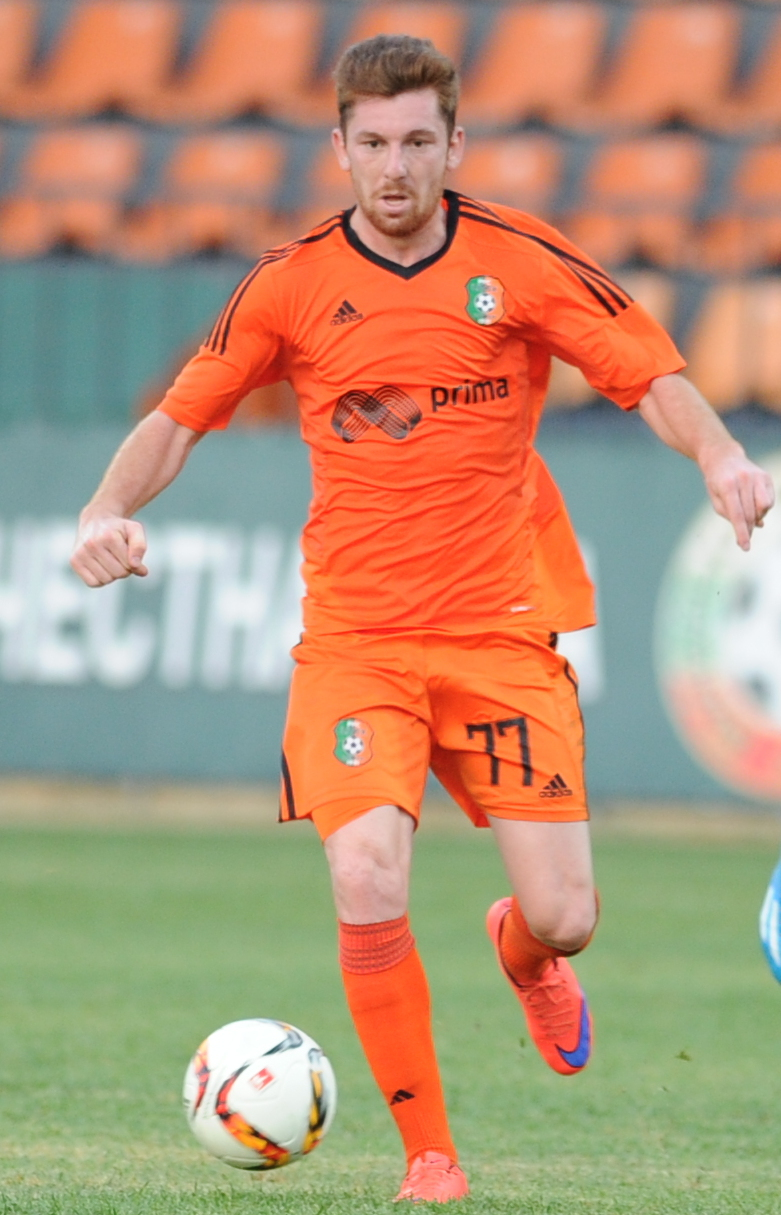
- Arsénio with Litex Lovech in 2015

Personal information
- Full name: Arsénio Martins Lafuente Nunes
- Date of birth: 30 August 1989 (age 37)
- Place of birth: Esposende, Portugal
- Height: 1.80 m (5 ft 11 in)
- Position: Winger

Team information
- Current team: Lusitânia
- Number: 12

Youth career
- 1998–2001: Esposende
- 2001–2004: Porto
- 2004–2008: Leixões

Senior career*
Years	Team	Apps	(Gls)
2008–2010	Padroense	46	(4)
2010–2011	Marítimo B	21	(3)
2011–2012	Ribeirão	24	(4)
2012–2014	Belenenses	47	(5)
2014	→ Moreirense (loan)	16	(3)
2014–2015	Moreirense	31	(3)
2015–2016	Litex Lovech	20	(3)
2016	Litex Lovech II	10	(7)
2016–2017	CSKA Sofia	28	(4)
2017–2019	Moreirense	59	(6)
2019–2020	Al-Fayha	28	(1)
2021–2023	Arouca	85	(7)
2023–2025	União Leiria	32	(1)
2025–	Lusitânia	47	(6)

International career
2008	Portugal U19	1	(0)
- * Club domestic league appearances and goals as of 10:32, 21 September 2026 (UTC)

Arsénio Martins Lafuente Nunes (born 30 August 1989), known simply as Arsénio, is a Portuguese professional footballer who plays as a winger for Liga Portugal 2 club Lusitânia.

== Club career ==
Born in Esposende, Braga District, Arsénio began playing football with local A.D. Esposende, signing with FC Porto at the age of 12 and completing his development with Leixões SC. He spent his first four years as a senior in the lower leagues, with Padroense FC, C.S. Marítimo B and G.D. Ribeirão.

Arsénio signed with C.F. Os Belenenses in summer 2012, playing his first match as a professional on 11 August and scoring once in a 3–1 home win against C.D. Feirense in the Segunda Liga. He contributed 42 games and five goals during the season, helping the Lisbon club to return to the Primeira Liga after three years.

Arsénio made his debut in the top tier on 18 August 2013, coming on as a 46th-minute substitute in a 0–3 home loss to Rio Ave FC. In the following transfer window, he was loaned to Moreirense F.C. of division two, scoring three times as his team achieved promotion as champions. Subsequently, the move was made permanent for two years.

On 18 June 2015, Arsénio joined Bulgarian side PFC Litex Lovech. His first competitive appearance took place on 2 July, as he featured 77 minutes of the 1–1 draw at FK Jelgava in the first qualifying round of the UEFA Europa League. He scored his first goal in the league later that month, in a 2–2 away draw against PFC Levski Sofia.

On 1 July 2017, Arsénio returned to Portugal, its top division and Moreirense by signing a two-year contract. On 30 December, he scored once and provided an assist in a 3–3 home draw against Vitória S.C. in the group stage of the Taça da Liga. He added three decisive passes on 2 November 2018, being voted player of the match in the 3–1 away victory over S.L. Benfica in the domestic league.

On 6 December 2020, after one season in the Saudi Pro League with Al-Fayha Club, Arsénio went back to his homeland on a deal at F.C. Arouca. He contributed six goals and as many assists to help the latter club to return to the top flight via the play-offs, and subsequently renewed his link.

Arsénio then spent one and a half seasons in the second division with U.D. Leiria. In February 2025, the 35-year-old moved down to Liga 3 with Lusitânia FC, earning another promotion in his debut campaign as champion and agreeing a to a new contract until June 2026.

== International career ==
Arsénio represented Portugal at under-19 level. He is of Mozambican descent.

== Honours ==
Belenenses

- Segunda Liga: 2012–13

Moreirense

- Segunda Liga: 2013–14

Lusitânia

- Liga 3: 2024–25
