= Radoslav Iliev =

Bulgarian footballer

Personal information
- Full name: Radoslav Iliyanov Iliev
- Date of birth: 30 July 2000 (age 26)
- Place of birth: Bulgaria
- Position: Midfielder

Team information
- Current team: Vitosha Bistritsa
- Number: 21

Youth career
- 2014–2017: CSKA Sofia

Senior career*
Years	Team	Apps	(Gls)
2016–2017	CSKA Sofia II	1	(0)
2017–2019	CSKA Sofia	1	(0)
2019–2020	Sportist Svoge	2	(1)
2020–2021	Slivnishki Geroy	5	(0)
2021–2023	Vitosha Bistritsa	35	(1)
2023	Nadezhda Dobroslavtsi	12	(3)
2023–2024	Vitosha Bistritsa	18	(1)
2024–2025	CSKA 1948 II	26	(0)
2024–2025	CSKA 1948	2	(0)
2025–	Vitosha Bistritsa		
- * Club domestic league appearances and goals as of 08:30, 13 December 2024 (UTC)

Radoslav Iliev (Bulgarian: Радослав Илиев; born 2000) is a Bulgarian footballer who plays as a midfielder for Vitosha Bistritsa.

== Career ==
=== CSKA Sofia ===
On 31 May 2017 he made his debut for CSKA Sofia in a match against Dunav Ruse.

== Career statistics ==
=== Club ===
As of 31 May 2017

Club performance			League		Cup		Continental		Other		Total	
Club	League	Season	Apps	Goals	Apps	Goals	Apps	Goals	Apps	Goals	Apps	Goals
Bulgaria			League		Bulgarian Cup		Europe		Other (Note: Includes Bulgarian Supercup matches.)		Total	
CSKA Sofia II	Second League	2016–17	1	0	–		–		–		1	0
CSKA Sofia	First League	2016–17	1	0	0	0	—		—		1	0
CSKA Sofia	First League	2017–18	0	0	0	0	—		—		0	0
CSKA Sofia	First League	2018–19	0	0	0	0	—		—		0	0
CSKA Sofia	Total		1	0	0	0	0	0	0	0	1	0
Career statistics			2	0	0	0	0	0	0	0	2	0
