= Milcho Angelov =

Bulgarian footballer

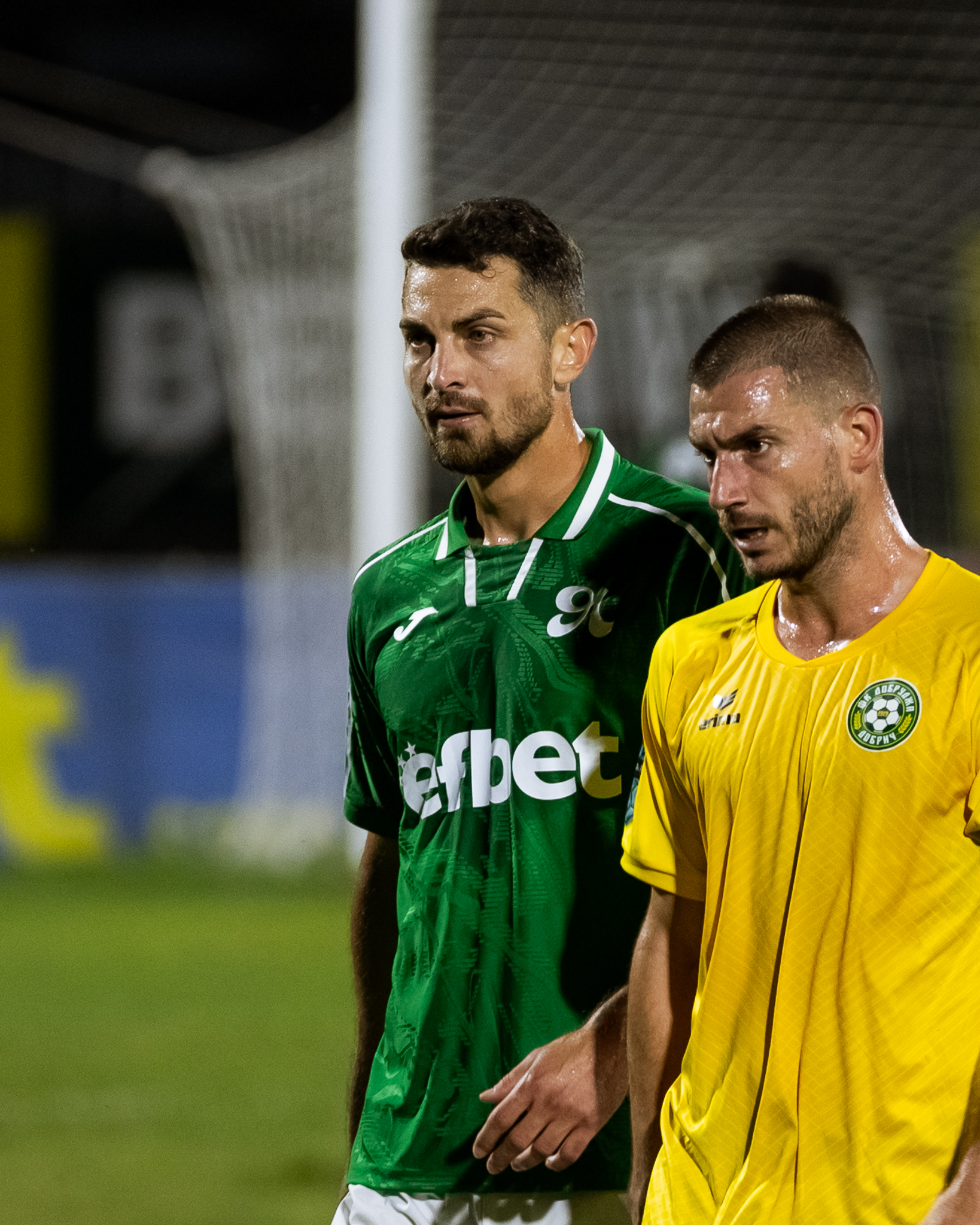
- Angelov with Yantra in 2026

Personal information
- Full name: Milcho Angelov Angelov
- Date of birth: 2 January 1995 (age 31)
- Place of birth: Irechekovo, Bulgaria
- Height: 1.84 m (6 ft 1/2 in)
- Position: Forward

Team information
- Current team: Yantra Gabrovo
- Number: 9

Youth career
- 2009–2013: Chernomorets Burgas

Senior career*
Years	Team	Apps	(Gls)
2012–2014	Chernomorets Burgas	31	(6)
2014–2016	Litex Lovech	29	(1)
2015–2016	Litex Lovech II	18	(6)
2016–2017	CSKA Sofia	13	(4)
2016–2017	CSKA Sofia II	17	(12)
2018	Slavia Sofia	27	(3)
2019–2021	Etar Veliko Tarnovo	67	(11)
2021–2022	Tsarsko Selo	18	(1)
2022–2023	FC Brașov	34	(21)
2023–2024	Argeș Pitești	22	(5)
2024	CSM Reșița	6	(0)
2025	Dobrudzha Dobrich	31	(14)
2026–	Yantra Gabrovo	22	(13)

International career
2012	Bulgaria U17	4	(1)
2012–2013	Bulgaria U19	8	(4)
2015–2016	Bulgaria U21	3	(0)
- * Club domestic league appearances and goals as of 20:41, 11 September 2026 (UTC)

Milcho Angelov Angelov (Bulgarian: Милчо Ангелов Ангелов; born 2 January 1995) is a Bulgarian professional footballer who plays as a forward for Yantra Gabrovo.

== Career ==
Born in Irechekovo, Yambol Province, Angelov joined the Chernomorets Burgas youth team in 2009.

He made his senior debut on 23 November 2012, at the age of 17, scoring two goals in a 5–0 victory over Spartak Pleven in the Bulgarian Cup. On 16 January 2013, Angelov signed his first professional contract. On 10 March 2013, he made his A PFG debut, starting in a game against CSKA Sofia.

On 30 June 2023, Argeș Pitești announced the signing of Angelov.

== Honours ==
Slavia Sofia

- Bulgarian Cup: 2017–18
- Bulgarian Supercup runner-up: 2018
