= Aleksandar Dyulgerov =

Bulgarian footballer

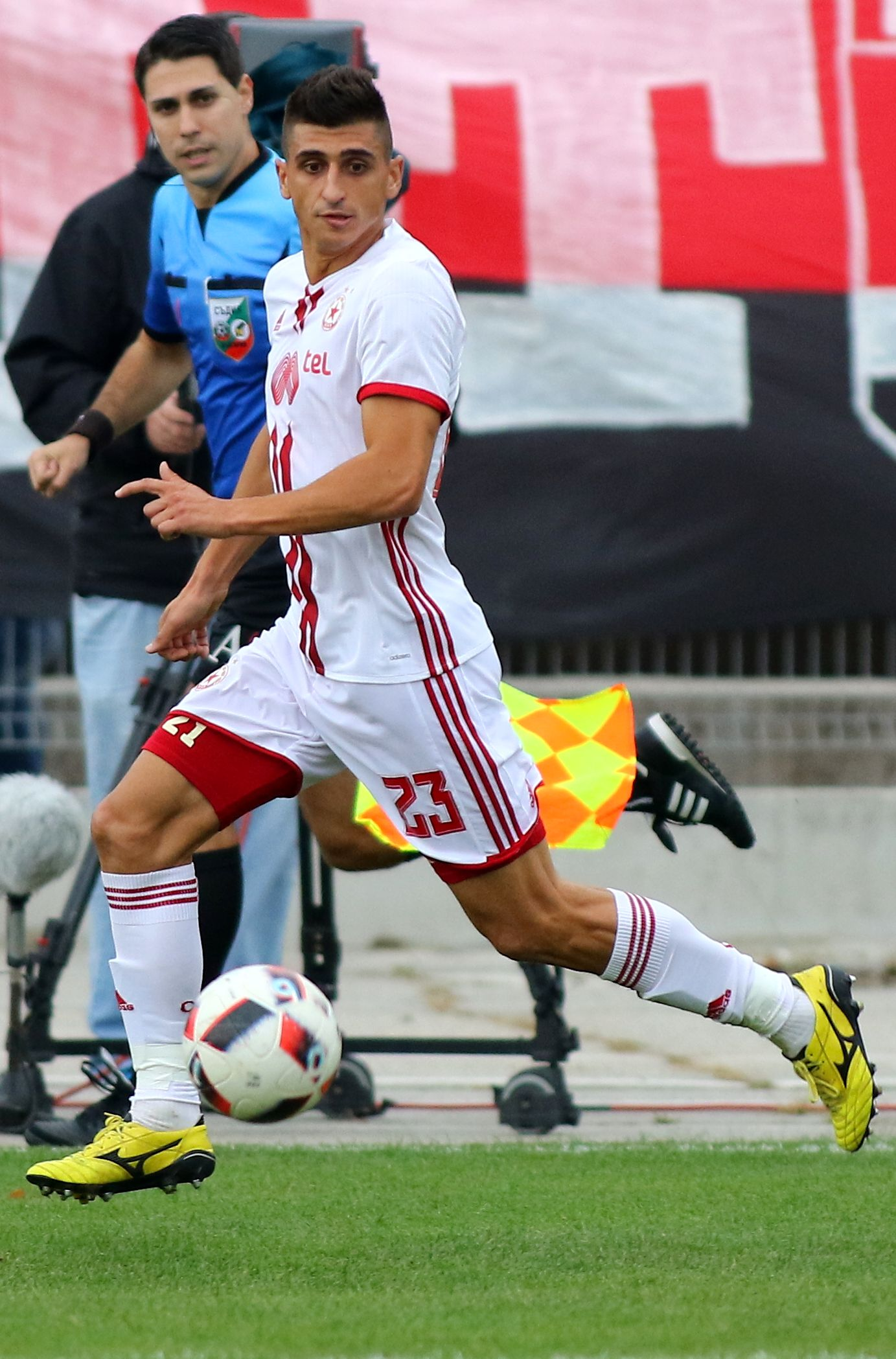

Personal information
- Full name: Aleksandar Antoniev Dyulgerov
- Date of birth: 19 April 1990 (age 36)
- Place of birth: Blagoevgrad, Bulgaria
- Height: 1.84 m (6 ft 0 in)
- Positions: Right back; centre back

Team information
- Current team: Marek Dupnitsa
- Number: 23

Senior career*
Years	Team	Apps	(Gls)
2009–2011	Pirin Blagoevgrad	14	(0)
2011–2012	CSKA Sofia	0	(0)
2011–2012	→ Montana (loan)	14	(0)
2012–2013	Lokomotiv Sofia	38	(2)
2014	Slavia Sofia	9	(0)
2014–2015	Concordia Chiajna	9	(0)
2015–2016	Pirin Blagoevgrad	32	(1)
2016–2018	CSKA Sofia	41	(1)
2017	→ CSKA II	3	(0)
2019	Septemvri Sofia	12	(1)
2019–2020	Etar	23	(2)
2020–2025	Pirin Blagoevgrad	157	(9)
2026–	Marek Dupnitsa	14	(0)
- * Club domestic league appearances and goals as of 11 June 2026

Aleksandar Dyulgerov (Bulgarian: Александър Дюлгеров; born 19 April 1990) is a Bulgarian professional footballer who plays as a defender for Marek Dupnitsa.
