= Lyubomir Bozhinov =

Bulgarian footballer

Personal information
- Full name: Lyubomir Kostadinov Bozhinov
- Date of birth: 16 May 1986 (age 40)
- Place of birth: Burgas, Bulgaria
- Height: 1.74 m (5 ft 9 in)
- Position: Central midfielder

Team information
- Current team: Chernomorets Burgas
- Number: 32

Senior career*
Years	Team	Apps	(Gls)
2004–2008	Naftex Burgas	69	(8)
2008–2009	Chernomorets Burgas	9	(0)
2009–2011	Chernomorets Pomorie	51	(8)
2011	Lokomotiv Sofia	4	(0)
2012–2014	Neftochimic 1986	49	(10)
2014–2016	Pomorie	53	(19)
2016–2017	Neftochimic Burgas	20	(1)
2017–2018	Pomorie	40	(6)
2019	Neftochimic Burgas	14	(4)
2019–	Chernomorets Burgas	0	(0)
- * Club domestic league appearances and goals as of 1 June 2019

Lyubomir Bozhinov (Bulgarian: Любомир Божинов; born 16 May 1986) is a Bulgarian footballer who plays as a central midfielder for Chernomorets Burgas.

== Career ==
Born in Burgas, Bozhinov was part of the Naftex youth squad, before he made his A PFG debut in a 0–0 away draw with Nesebar on 11 September 2004. The following 2005–06 season saw Bozhinov make 11 appearances for The Sheiks, but Naftex were relegated from the A PFG at the end of the campaign. During the 2006–07 season, on 15 October 2006, again against Nesebar he scored his first professional career goal in a 2–0 away win.

In 2008, he left Naftex Burgas for Chernomorets Burgas, but earned only 9 appearances in the A PFG during the 2008–09 season. In May 2009 Bozhinov joined the club's satellite team Chernomorets Pomorie.

In June 2011, after two seasons outside the A PFG, Bozhinov signed a contract with Lokomotiv Sofia. He left the club in early December, due to financial problems.

On 22 June 2017, Bozhinov signed with Pomorie for the third time in his career.

== Career statistics ==
As of 1 June 2017

Club	Season	League		Cup		Europe		Total	
Club	Season	Apps	Goals	Apps	Goals	Apps	Goals	Apps	Goals
Naftex Burgas	2004–05	10	0	3	0	–	–	13	0
Naftex Burgas	2005–06	11	0	2	0	–	–	13	0
Naftex Burgas	2006–07	24	4	1	1	–	–	25	5
Naftex Burgas	2007–08	24	4	2	0	–	–	26	4
Chernomorets Burgas	2008–09	9	0	1	0	–	–	10	0
Chernomorets Pomorie	2009–10	22	4	4	2	–	–	26	6
Chernomorets Pomorie	2010–11	29	4	3	0	–	–	32	4
Lokomotiv Sofia	2011–12	4	0	1	0	2	1	7	1
Neftochimic Burgas	2011–12	11	3	0	0	–	–	11	3
Neftochimic Burgas	2012–13	23	5	3	0	–	–	26	5
Neftochimic Burgas	2013–14	15	2	0	0	–	–	15	2
Pomorie	2014–15	27	10	0	0	–	–	27	10
Pomorie	2015–16	26	9	1	0	–	–	27	9
Neftochimic Burgas	2016–17	20	1	1	0	–	–	21	1
Career totals		247	45	22	3	2	1	271	49

== Honours ==
Neftochimic Burgas

- B PFG: 2013
