= Milen Manchev =

Bulgarian footballer

Personal information
- Full name: Milen Yavorov Manchev
- Date of birth: 4 January 2000 (age 26)
- Place of birth: Sofia, Bulgaria
- Height: 1.94 m (6 ft 4 in)
- Position: Defender

Team information
- Current team: Werder Bremen III

Youth career
- 2010–2014: Levski Sofia
- 2014–2019: CSKA Sofia

College career
Years	Team	Apps	(Gls)
2019–2022	Fort Lewis Skyhawks		

Senior career*
Years	Team	Apps	(Gls)
2016–2017	CSKA Sofia II	1	(0)
2017–2019	CSKA Sofia	1	(0)
2022	TuS Mayen	33	(2)
2023	Blau-Weiß Friesdorf	14	(0)
2023–2024	FV Bonn-Endenich	27	(0)
2024–2025	VfB Homberg	8	(0)
2025–	Werder Bremen III	4	(0)
- * Club domestic league appearances and goals as of 18:13, 4 September 2025 (UTC)

Milen Manchev (Bulgarian: Милен Манчев; born 4 January 2000) is a Bulgarian footballer who plays as a midfielder for German club Werder Bremen III.

== Career ==
=== CSKA Sofia ===
On 31 May 2017 he made his debut for CSKA Sofia in match against Dunav Ruse.

== Career statistics ==
=== Club ===
As of 31 May 2017

Club performance			League		Cup		Continental		Other		Total	
Club	League	Season	Apps	Goals	Apps	Goals	Apps	Goals	Apps	Goals	Apps	Goals
Bulgaria			League		Bulgarian Cup		Europe		Other (Note: Includes Bulgarian Supercup matches.)		Total	
CSKA Sofia II	Second League	2016–17	1	0	–		–		–		1	0
CSKA Sofia	First League	2016–17	1	0	0	0	—		—		1	0
CSKA Sofia	Total		1	0	0	0	0	0	0	0	1	0
Career statistics			2	0	0	0	0	0	0	0	2	0
