= Stanislav Manolev =

Bulgarian footballer

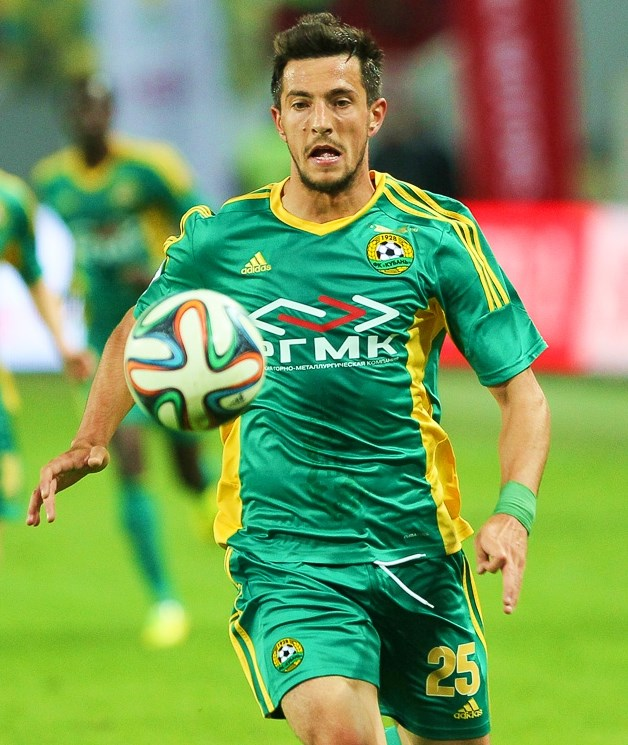
- Manolev with Kuban in 2014

Personal information
- Full name: Stanislav Lyubenov Manolev
- Date of birth: 16 December 1985 (age 40)
- Place of birth: Blagoevgrad, Bulgaria
- Height: 1.85 m (6 ft 1 in)
- Position: Right-back

Senior career*
Years	Team	Apps	(Gls)
2002–2004	Pirin 1922	26	(1)
2005–2009	Litex Lovech	92	(17)
2006	→ Pirin 1922 (loan)	12	(1)
2009–2014	PSV Eindhoven	95	(4)
2013	→ Fulham (loan)	5	(0)
2013–2014	→ Jong PSV	10	(1)
2014	Kuban Krasnodar	10	(1)
2014	Dynamo Moscow	8	(1)
2015–2016	Kuban Krasnodar	21	(0)
2016–2018	CSKA Sofia	65	(5)
2017	→ CSKA II	1	(0)
2019–2020	Ludogorets Razgrad	20	(1)
2019–2020	→ Ludogorets II	2	(2)
2020–2022	Pirin Blagoevgrad	51	(12)
Total		405	(41)

International career
2006	Bulgaria U21	4	(0)
2008–2018	Bulgaria	51	(5)

Managerial career
- 2022–2023: Pirin Blagoevgrad
- * Club domestic league appearances and goals

Stanislav Lyubenov Manolev (Bulgarian: Станислав Любенов Манолев; born 16 December 1985) is a Bulgarian professional football manager and former player. During his playing career, his primary position was at right-back.

== Club career ==
=== Pirin 1922 ===
Stanislav Manolev, a Bulgarian right-back, began his senior career at Pirin 1922 , which was his hometown club, making approximately 26 appearances before 2005. He also had a loan spell back at Pirin in 2006

=== Litex Lovech ===
In early 2005 he moved to Litex. Manolev won The National Cup in 2008 with Litex. In the final on 21 May 2008 against Cherno More Varna, Manolev scored the only goal after 53 minutes. Next year, Litex won the cup again. The event took place on 26 May 2009.

=== PSV Eindhoven ===
On 25 July 2009, Manolev signed a 3+2 years contract with the Dutch club PSV Eindhoven, to fend competitions from Aston Villa. On 6 August 2009, Manolev made his official debut for PSV Eindhoven. He was selected as a starter against Bulgarian club Cherno More in the UEFA Europa League 3rd qualification round. Unluckily for him he was sent off for a second bookable offense in the 44th minute of the game, but his team went on to repeat its 1–0 win from the first leg.

On 9 August 2009, Manolev made his full debut for PSV Eindhoven in the Eredivisie. He played 69 minutes before being substituted for Jan Kromkamp, assisting Balázs Dzsudzsák's equalizing goal and earning himself a booking. On 16 August 2009, Manolev played the full 90 minutes of PSV's 4–3 home win against AFC Ajax and assisted Otman Bakkal's decisive goal in the 75th minute of the game. On 23 August 2009, Manolev had another fine display, assisting two PSV goals in the 3–1 home win against NAC Breda. On 12 September 2009, he scored his first goal in the 3–0 home win against Roda JC. On 28 October 2009, Manolev scored his second goal for PSV against Roda JC for a match from the KNVB Cup. On 14 April 2010, Manolev scored his second league goal in the 2–2 draw with Heerenveen.

In the 2011–12 season, Manolev signed a new contract with PSV until 2014. In the summer transfer window in 2012, Manolev was linked around Europe, with VfB Stuttgart and Sporting Lisbon.

Subsequently, his performance at PSV led to him being branded as "the worst right back in Europe" by RTL pundits, such as René van der Gijp, having become his outspoken critics since his arrival. Despite this, Manolev refused to bow down to the criticism he received, being quoted as saying: "I do not look at it and I do not make me worry about," said Manolev then. "This man (ed. Van der Gijp) is paid to give his opinion, fine. I look good at the Bulgarian television."

Upon his loan spell ended from Fulham, having lost a first team place to Santiago Arias and Joshua Brenet. PSV would allow Manolev to leave the club on free transfer, as well leaving on cheap basis. After a failed move in the summer transfer window, Manolev was then sent to the reserve team and went on to make ten appearances, scoring once.

In the January transfer window, Manolev left the club by mutual consent, with just six month left to his contract after the club did not display an interest to extend his contract.

=== Fulham (loan) ===
Manolev signed for Premier League side Fulham on loan until the end of the season on 31 January 2013.

On 9 February 2013, Manolev made his debut in a 0–0 draw against Norwich City. In a 1–0 loss against Arsenal on 20 April 2013, Manolev was fouled by Olivier Giroud, who later got sent-off in the 85th minute. Manolev made five league appearances and returned to PSV despite hopes of joining Fulham on a permanent basis. After his loan spell finished, Manolev expressed he was "delighted to be given a chance to play for Fulham".

=== Kuban Krasnodar ===
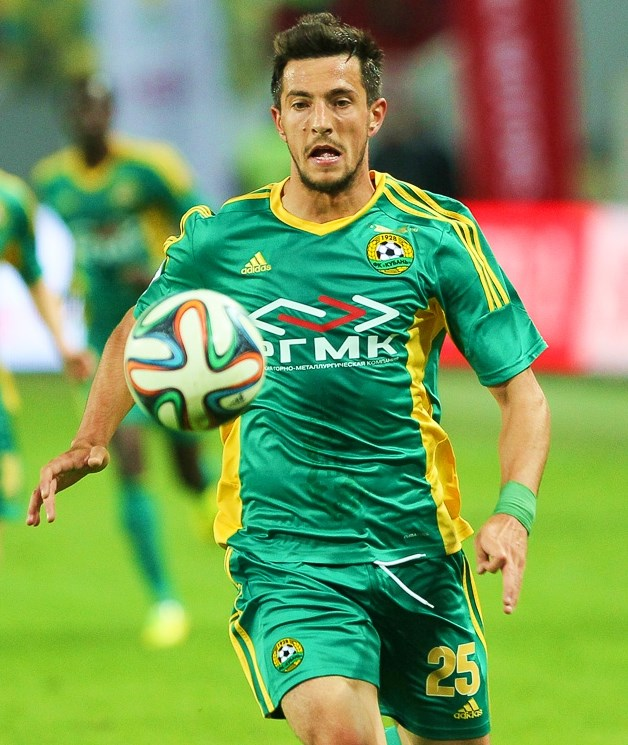
Manolev playing for Kuban in 2014

After being released by PSV, Manolev moved to Russia by joining Kuban Krasnodar, where he joined teammate Ivelin Popov. Manolev made his debut in a 1–1 draw against Dynamo Moscow. He scored his first goal for the club in a 4–0 win against Krylia Sovetov, netting the first goal of the game. The assist came from fellow Bulgarian teammate Ivelin Popov.

=== Dynamo Moscow ===
After his main tenure in the Netherlands, Manolev moved to Russia, signing with Dynamo Moscow in July 2014 as a free agent. He featured in 8 matches for the club across all competitions, scoring 1 goal before leaving in February 2015.

=== CSKA Sofia ===
Manolev returned to Bulgaria in September 2016 to join CSKA Sofia, where he spent over two years. He became a significant player for the club, recording 65 matches and scoring 5 goals during his spell, which concluded in February 2019.

=== Ludogorets Razgrad ===
His final spell with a major Bulgarian club was at Ludogorets Razgrad, where he signed a contract in February 2019. He won two national titles with the Razgrad-based team before leaving in July 2020. He was part of the squad that won the Bulgarian First League (2018–19) and the Bulgarian Super Cup (2019). He made 23 appearances and scored 1 goal for Ludogorets before leaving in June 2020. Manolev later concluded his playing career with another return to Pirin 1922 (as PFK Pirin 22 Blagoevgrad) in 2022.

=== Pirin Blagoevgrad ===
In the summer of 2020 he joined Pirin Blagoevgrad from his hometown. In August 2021, Manolev was accused of racism by CSKA Sofia player Amos Youga. He was subsequently banned for 5 matches, but on appeal the punishment for racism was dropped, with the player instead ordered to serve a 3-match suspension for general insults directed at the opponent. He officially retired on 21 May 2022, when he played his last match against Botev Vratsa, when he was substituted in the 11th minute, his playing number for the most of his career.

== International career ==
Manolev started his career for the Bulgaria national football team during the World Cup 2010 qualifiers. In August 2008, the Bulgaria national team coach Plamen Markov called Stanislav in Bulgaria national football team in a match against Bosnia and Herzegovina national football team. Manolev made his official debut and Bulgaria won the match as a guest. Manolev was a part of the Bulgaria national football team in the World Cup 2010 qualifiers against Italy and Montenegro, but remained an unused substitute. He played 45 minutes in the second half of the friendly between Bulgaria and Serbia in November 2008. He was in the starting 11 in the next two games against the Republic of Ireland and Cyprus. He scored his first goal for Bulgaria in a 2014 FIFA World Cup qualification match against Italy that finished 2–2.

On 28 March 2015, Manolev made an assist for the Bulgaria national team during a 2–2 draw with Italy. On 31 August 2017 he scored his first international goal in more than four years for the historical 3–2 home win against Sweden.

== Career statistics ==
=== Club ===
Appearances and goals by club, season and competition
Club	Season	League (Note: Includes appearances in play-offs)			Cup (Note: Includes appearances in League Cup and Super Cup games)		Europe		Total	
Club	Season	Division	Apps	Goals	Apps	Goals	Apps	Goals	Apps	Goals
Pirin 1922	2002–03	B Group	10	0	?	?	–		10	0
Pirin 1922	2003–04	A Group	8	0	?	?	–		8	0
Pirin 1922	2004–05	B Group	17	2	?	?	–		17	2
Pirin 1922	Total		35	2	?	?	0	0	35	2
Litex Lovech	2004–05	A Group	2	0	?	?	0	0	2	0
Litex Lovech	2005–06	A Group	3	0	?	?	1	0	4	0
Litex Lovech	2006–07	A Group	28	4	4	0	6	0	38	4
Litex Lovech	2007–08	A Group	25	3	5	1	4	0	34	4
Litex Lovech	2008–09	A Group	28	5	5	0	4	0	37	5
Litex Lovech	Total		86	12	14	1	15	0	115	13
Pirin 1922 (loan)	2005–06	A Group	13	1	?	?	–		13	1
PSV	2009–10	Eredivisie	30	2	2	1	9	0	41	3
PSV	2010–11	Eredivisie	21	0	3	0	8	0	32	0
PSV	2011–12	Eredivisie	23	1	4	1	12	1	39	3
PSV	2012–13	Eredivisie	2	0	2	1	4	0	8	1
PSV	Total		76	3	11	3	33	1	120	7
Fulham (loan)	2012–13	Premier League	5	0	0	0	–		5	0
Jong PSV	2013–14	Eerste Divisie	10	1	0	0	–		10	1
Kuban Krasnodar	2013–14	Russian Premier League	10	1	0	0	0	0	10	1
Dynamo Moscow	2014–15	Russian Premier League	8	1	1	0	5	0	14	1
Kuban Krasnodar	2014–15	Russian Premier League	6	0	1	0	–		7	0
Kuban Krasnodar	2015–16	Russian Premier League	17	0	1	0	–		18	0
Kuban Krasnodar	Total		23	0	2	0	0	0	25	0
CSKA Sofia	2016–17	First League	24	0	0	0	–		24	0
CSKA Sofia	2017–18	First League	30	4	2	0	–		32	4
CSKA Sofia	2018–19	First League	11	1	2	0	1	0	14	1
CSKA Sofia	Total		65	5	4	0	1	0	70	5
Ludogorets Razgrad II	2018–19	Second League	2	2	–		–		2	2
Ludogorets Razgrad	2018–19	First League	5	0	1	0	0	0	6	0
Ludogorets Razgrad	2019–20	First League	15	1	1	0	1	0	17	1
Ludogorets Razgrad	Total		20	1	2	0	1	0	23	1
Pirin Blagoevgrad	2020–21	Second League	24	5	1	0	–		25	5
Pirin Blagoevgrad	2021–22	First League	27	7	1	0	–		28	7
Pirin Blagoevgrad	Total		51	12	2	0	0	0	53	12
Career total			404	41	36	4	55	1	495	46

=== International ===
Appearances and goals by national team and year
National team	Year	Apps	Goals
Bulgaria	2008	3	0
Bulgaria	2009	6	0
Bulgaria	2010	4	0
Bulgaria	2011	6	0
Bulgaria	2012	9	2
Bulgaria	2013	7	2
Bulgaria	2014	6	0
Bulgaria	2015	4	0
Bulgaria	2017	5	1
Bulgaria	2018	1	0
Total		51	5

Scores and results list Bulgaria's goal tally first, score column indicates score after each Manolev goal.

List of international goals scored by Stanislav Manolev
#	Date	Venue	Opponent	Score	Result	Competition
1.	7 September 2012	Vasil Levski National Stadium, Sofia, Bulgaria	Italy	1–0	2–2	2014 FIFA World Cup qualification
2.	11 September 2012	Vasil Levski National Stadium, Sofia, Bulgaria	Armenia	1–0	1–0	2014 FIFA World Cup qualification
3.	26 March 2013	Parken Stadium, Copenhagen, Denmark	Denmark	1–0	1–1	2014 FIFA World Cup qualification
4.	30 May 2013	Toyota Stadium, Nagoya, Japan	Japan	1–0	2–0	Friendly
5.	31 August 2017	Vasil Levski National Stadium, Sofia, Bulgaria	Sweden	1–0	3–2	2018 FIFA World Cup qualification

== Honours ==
- Litex Lovech
  - Bulgarian Cup: 2008, 2009
- PSV Eindhoven
  - KNVB Cup: 2012
- Ludogorets
  - First League: 2018–19
  - Bulgarian Supercup: 2019
- Pirin Blagoevgrad
  - Second League: 2020–21
