= PFC Litex Lovech II =

Bulgarian football club

Litex Lovech II
- Nickname(s): The Oranges
- Short name: Litex II
- Founded: 2015; 10 years ago
- Dissolved: June 2, 2016; 9 years ago
- Ground: Lovech Stadium, Lovech
- Capacity: 8,100
- 2015–16: B Group, 5th
- Website: http://pfclitex.com/
Home colours	Away colours

PFC Litex Lovech II (Bulgarian: ПФК Литекс Ловеч 2) or Litex Lovech 2 was a Bulgarian football team based in Lovech. Founded in 2015, it was the reserve team of PFC Litex Lovech, and completed one season in B Group, the second level of Bulgarian football.

== History ==
=== Foundation ===
At the beginning of 2015 BFUnion discussed the idea of teams from A Group having a second team in B Group or lower. Ludogorets Razgrad, Litex Lovech, Levski Sofia, CSKA Sofia, Cherno More Varna and Botev Plovdiv showed interest in having a team in B group. At the beginning of June 2015, BFU announced that only Litex and Ludogorets had applied to have their 2nd teams in B Group. Later Litex II and Ludogorets II were added in B Group for the 2015–16 season.

=== 2015–16 season ===
After the administrative relegation to the B Group on 21 January 2016 (for the 2016–17 season) of Litex Lovech, the 2nd team will be relegated to the V Group for the 2016–17 season, but the team will complete the season in the B Group until end of 2015–16 season and as the first team won't complete in A Group, most of the players could complete for the 2nd team and play for the first team in the Bulgarian Cup since Litex Lovech is part of semifinals.

== Managers ==
Dates	Name	Honours
2015–2016	(Bulgaria) Stamen Belchev	
2016	(Bulgaria) Lyuboslav Penev	

== Past seasons ==
Season	League	Place	W	D	L	GF	GA	Pts
2015–16	B PFG (II)	5	14	7	9	50	38	49
Green marks a season followed by promotion, red a season followed by relegation.

== Most matches ==
=== B Group ===
Ranking	Nationality	Name	Years	Matches	Goals
1	Bulgaria	Aleksandar Tsvetkov	2015–2016	22	1
2	Bulgaria	Aleksandar Konov	2015–2016	21	0
3	Bulgaria	Rumen Rumenov	2015–2016	18	3
4	Bulgaria	Milcho Angelov	2015–2016	17	5
5	Bulgaria	Chavdar Ivaylov	2015–2016	16	4
6	Bulgaria	Tonislav Yordanov	2015–2016	14	1
7	Bulgaria	Aleksandar Georgiev	2015–2016	13	4
–	Bulgaria	Kiril Despodov	2015–2016	13	3
–	Bulgaria	Ivan Goranov	2015–2016	13	2
–	Bulgaria	Krasimir Stanoev	2015–2016	13	1
