= 2015–16 B Group =

Bulgarian B Group
- Season: 2015–16
- Promoted: Dunav Ruse; Vereya; Loko GO; Neftochimic
- Matches: 240
- Goals: 580 (2.42 per match)
- Top goalscorer: Tihomir Kanev (14 goals)

The 2015–16 B Group was the 60th season of the Bulgarian B Football Group, the second tier of the Bulgarian football league system.

A total of 16 teams contested the league: 10 of which returning from the 2014–15 season, 4 of which promoted from third division and two new teams - the reserves team of Ludogorets Razgrad and Litex Lovech.

This season was different compared to previous seasons in terms of promotion. Since the league structure was changed for the first and second tiers, as well as the licensing criteria needed for teams entering the First League, a select number of teams were promoted administratively to the First League, without consideration of their league positions, which was reflected in the league table.

== Stadia and locations ==
Location of teams in B Group 2015–16

Team	City	Stadium	Capacity
Bansko	Bansko	Saint Peter	3,000
Botev	Galabovo	Energetik	3,000
Dobrudzha	Dobrich	Druzhba	12,500
Dunav	Ruse	Gradski Stadium	19,960
Litex II	Lovech	Lovech Stadium	8,100
Lokomotiv	Gorna Oryahovitsa	Lokomotiv	12,000
Lokomotiv 2012	Mezdra	Lokomotiv	5,000
Ludogorets II	Razgrad	Ludogorets Arena	7,500
Neftochimic	Burgas	Lazur Stadium	18,037
Oborishte	Panagyurishte	Orcho Voivoda	3,000
Pirin	Razlog	Razlog Stadium	6,500
Pomorie	Pomorie	Pomorie Stadium	2,000
Septemvri	Simitli	Struma	8,000
Sozopol	Sozopol	Arena Sozopol	3,500
Spartak	Pleven	Pleven Stadium	22,000
Vereya	Stara Zagora	Trace Arena	1,714

== League table ==
Pos	Team	Pld	W	D	L	GF	GA	GD	Pts	Promotion, qualification or relegation
1	Dunav Ruse (P)	30	18	10	2	53	19	+34	64	Promotion to the First League
2	Pomorie (Q)	30	15	9	6	36	23	+13	54	Qualification for the promotion play-offs
3	Lokomotiv Gorna Oryahovitsa (P)	30	13	11	6	42	26	+16	50	Promotion to the First League
4	Sozopol	30	13	10	7	44	28	+16	49 (Note: SOZ 3−1 LIT; LIT 3−1 SOZ)	
5	Litex II (R)	30	14	7	9	50	38	+12	49 (Note: Litex II will be relegated to V AFG regardless of their position at the end of the season, due to the relegation of the first team.)	Relegation to the Third League
6	Botev Galabovo	30	12	5	13	32	47	−15	41 (Note: LUD 0−1 GAL; GAL 3−1 LUD)	
7	Ludogorets Razgrad II	30	12	5	13	41	41	0	41	
8	Vereya (P)	30	10	10	10	33	27	+6	40	Promotion to the First League
9	Bansko	30	11	6	13	42	38	+4	39 (Note: OBO 2−2 BAN; BAN 2−1 OBO)	
10	Oborishte	30	11	6	13	29	33	−4	39	
11	Pirin Razlog	30	10	8	12	31	41	−10	38 (Note: PRZ 3−1 NEF; NEF 1−0 PRZ)	
12	Neftochimic (P)	30	8	14	8	31	39	−8	38	Promotion to the First League
13	Spartak Pleven	30	9	9	12	35	42	−7	36	
14	Dobrudzha Dobrich (R)	30	8	10	12	27	33	−6	34	Relegation to the Third League
15	Septemvri Simitli (R)	30	6	5	19	26	50	−24	23	Relegation to the Third League
16	Lokomotiv 2012 Mezdra (R)	30	5	5	20	28	55	−27	20	Relegation to the Third League

Source: bulgarian-football.com
Rules for classification: 1st points; 2nd head-to-head points; 3rd head-to-head goal difference; 4th head-to-head goals scored; 5th goal difference; 6th number of goals scored; 7th Fair-play points; 8th Draw
(P) Promoted; (Q) Qualified for the phase indicated; (R) Relegated

== Results ==
Home \ Away	BAN	GAL	DOB	DUN	LIT	LGO	LM12	LUD	NEF	OBO	PRZ	POM	SIM	SOZ	SPL	VER
Bansko		2–1	0–1	1–2	2–2	0–0	2–2	1–0	3–0	2–1	3–0	0–1	2–0	0–0	1–2	5–0
Botev Galabovo	1–0		2–1	0–1	0–2	2–1	2–1	3–1	4–2	0–3	4–1	0–0	3–1	1–1	2–2	1–0
Dobrudzha Dobrich	1–2	1–1		1–1	2–1	0–1	3–1	1–1	2–0	2–1	0–0	0–1	1–0	1–1	1–1	0–1
Dunav Ruse	3–1	5–0	2–2		4–1	0–0	3–0	4–1	1–0	0–0	2–0	1–0	1–2	2–0	0–0	1–0
Litex II	1–0	3–0	1–1	1–2		1–4	2–1	2–0	1–1	4–1	1–0	0–1	0–0	3–1	4–1	1–0
Lokomotiv Gorna Oryahovitsa	2–1	2–0	1–1	2–0	1–2		2–0	4–1	1–3	0–1	0–0	1–1	2–1	3–2	5–1	1–0
Lokomotiv 2012 Mezdra	2–0	3–0	0–0	1–5	4–2	1–1		1–4	0–0	1–3	2–0	0–2	1–3	1–3	0–1	0–3
Ludogorets Razgrad II	2–1	0–1	1–2	2–3	2–1	2–1	1–2		0–0	2–0	1–1	0–0	5–0	3–2	3–1	1–1
Neftochimic	2–0	1–0	2–1	1–1	0–6	2–2	2–1	1–2		0–0	1–0	1–1	2–1	0–0	1–1	1–1
Oborishte	2–2	3–0	1–0	0–1	0–0	1–0	1–0	0–2	1–2		2–1	2–1	2–1	1–3	2–0	0–0
Pirin Razlog	2–2	2–0	2–0	2–2	0–0	0–0	3–1	1–0	3–1	2–1		0–1	2–1	1–0	2–1	1–1
Pomorie	0–1	0–0	1–0	1–2	0–4	1–1	1–0	1–0	2–1	3–0	5–1		3–2	2–1	1–0	4–1
Septemvri Simitli	2–3	0–1	0–1	0–4	1–1	0–1	2–2	0–1	0–0	0–0	1–0	2–1		0–3	2–0	4–2
Sozopol	2–1	5–1	2–0	0–0	3–1	0–0	2–0	4–1	1–1	1–0	1–2	0–0	1–0		3–2	1–0
Spartak Pleven	1–3	3–1	2–1	0–0	1–2	0–1	1–0	2–0	3–3	2–0	4–1	1–1	1–0	1–1		0–0
Vereya	3–1	0–1	3–0	0–0	5–0	2–2	1–0	0–2	0–0	1–0	3–0	0–0	4–0	0–0	1–0	

Source: bulgarian-football.com
Legend: Blue = home team win; Yellow = draw; Red = away team win.

== Promotion play-offs ==
4 June 2016
19:00 EEST

Montana	2−1	Pomorie
S. Georgiev 54'; Iliev 86'	Report	Bozhinov 73' (pen.)

Trace Arena, Stara Zagora
Attendance: 1,500
Referee: Nikola Popov (Sofia)

== Season statistics ==
=== Top scorers ===
Rank	Scorer	Club	Goals
1	(Bulgaria) Tihomir Kanev	Lokomotiv GO	14
2	(Bulgaria) Vasil Kaloyanov	Sozopol	13
3	(Bulgaria) Petar Dimitrov	Lokomotiv Mezdra	12
4	(Bulgaria) Yanaki Smirnov	Ludogorets Razgrad II	11
5	(Bulgaria) Diyan Dimov	Dunav Ruse	10
6	(Bulgaria) Lyubomir Bozhinov	Pomorie	9
7	(Bulgaria) Grigor Dolapchiev	Spartak Pleven	8
7	(Bulgaria) Borislav Hazurov	Bansko	8
7	(Bulgaria) Georgi Kirilov	Botev Galabovo	8
7	(Bulgaria) Ivan Kolev	Oborishte	8
7	(Bulgaria) Emanuil Manev	Sozopol	8
7	(Bulgaria) Yuliyan Nenov	Dunav Ruse	8

_{Updated on 1 June 2016}

=== Hat-tricks ===
Player	For	Against	Result	Date
(Bulgaria) Borislav Borisov	Neftochimic Burgas	Spartak Pleven	3–3	29 August 2015
(Bulgaria) Atanas Chipilov	Bansko	Vereya Stara Zagora	5–0	17 October 2015
(Bulgaria) Tihomir Kanev	Lokomotiv Gorna Oryahovitsa	Spartak Pleven	5–1	23 April 2016
