= 2019–20 PFC CSKA Sofia season =

CSKA Sofia
2019–20 season
- Controlling owner: Grisha Ganchev
- Manager: Dobromir Mitov (until 21 July 2019); Ljupko Petrović (until 2 October 2019); Dobromir Mitov (interim) (until 7 October 2019); Miloš Kruščić (until 2 July 2020); Stamen Belchev (from 2 July 2020)
- Parva Liga: Second place
- Bulgarian Cup: Final
- Europa League: Third qualifying round
- Top goalscorer: League: Ali Sowe (13 goals); All: Ali Sowe (15 goals)
- Highest home attendance: 15,310 (v Zorya Luhansk, 8 August 2019)
- Lowest home attendance: 720 (v Vitosha, 5 October 2019)
- Average home league attendance: 4,639
Home colours	Away colours	Third colours

The 2019–20 season is CSKA Sofia's 71st season in the First League and their fourth consecutive participation after their administrative relegation in the third division due to mounting financial troubles. This article shows player statistics and all matches (official and friendly) that the club will play during the 2019–20 season.

== Players ==
=== Current squad ===
As of 21 May 2020 Note: Flags indicate national team as defined under FIFA eligibility rules; some limited exceptions apply. Players may hold more than one non-FIFA nationality.

No.	Pos.	Nation	Player
1	GK	BUL	Iliya Shalamanov
3	DF	BRA	Geferson
4	DF	BUL	Bozhidar Chorbadzhiyski
6	MF	POR	Rúben Pinto (vice-captain)
8	MF	IRL	Graham Carey
9	FW	AUS	Tomi Juric
10	FW	BRA	Evandro
11	DF	BUL	Petar Zanev (captain)
13	GK	BRA	Gustavo Busatto
15	MF	BUL	Kristiyan Malinov
17	MF	BRA	Henrique

No.	Pos.	Nation	Player
18	DF	FRA	Bradley Mazikou
19	DF	BUL	Ivan Turitsov
20	MF	POR	Tiago Rodrigues
21	MF	GHA	Edwin Gyasi
22	FW	GAM	Ali Sowe
23	FW	BUL	Ahmed Ahmedov
24	MF	ITA	Stefano Beltrame
26	DF	BUL	Valentin Antov
27	MF	BUL	Martin Smolenski
28	DF	BUL	Plamen Galabov
30	GK	LTU	Vytautas Černiauskas

== Transfers ==
=== In ===
No.	Pos.	Nat.	Name	Age	EU	Moving from	Type	Transfer window	Ends	Transfer fee	Source
7	MF	(Russia)	Denis Davydov	24	Non-EU	(Russia) Nizhny Novgorod	Free transfer	Summer	2023	Free	cska.bg
9	FW	(Scotland)	Tony Watt	25	EU	(Scotland) St Johnstone	Free transfer	Summer	2022	Free	cska.bg
21	MF	(Italy)	Diego Fabbrini	28	EU	(Romania) Botoșani	Free transfer	Summer	2022	Free	cska.bg
11	DF	(Bulgaria)	Petar Zanev	33	EU	(Russia) Yenisey	Free transfer	Summer	2020	Free	cska.bg
1	GK	(Bulgaria)	Petar Petrov	20	EU	(Bulgaria) Litex Lovech	Loan return	Summer			cska.bg
23	MF	(Bulgaria)	Mitko Mitkov	18	EU	(Bulgaria) Litex Lovech	Loan return	Summer			cska.bg
24	DF	(Portugal)	Nuno Tomás	23	EU	(Portugal) Belenenses	Transfer	Summer	2022	Undisclosed	cska.bg
28	DF	(Bulgaria)	Plamen Galabov	23	EU	(Bulgaria) Etar Veliko Tarnovo	Loan return	Summer	2022		sportal.bg
8	MF	(Republic of Ireland)	Graham Carey	30	EU	(England) Plymouth Argyle	Free transfer	Summer	2021	Free	cska.bg
13	GK	(Brazil)	Gustavo Busatto	28	EU	(Brazil) Ituano	Transfer	Summer	2022	Undisclosed	cska.bg
14	MF	(England)	Viv Solomon-Otabor	23	EU	(England) Birmingham City	Transfer	Summer	2022	Free	cska.bg
25	DF	(Spain)	Raúl Albentosa	30	EU	(Spain) Deportivo La Coruña	Transfer	Summer	2022	Undisclosed	cska.bg
18	DF	(Republic of the Congo)	Bradley Mazikou	23	EU	(France) Lorient	Transfer	Summer	2022	Undisclosed	cska.bg
21/9	FW	(Australia)	Tomi Juric	28	EU	(Switzerland) Luzern	Free transfer	Summer	2022	Free	cska.bg
23	FW	(Bulgaria)	Ahmed Ahmedov	24	EU	(Bulgaria) Dunav Ruse	Transfer	Winter		€60,000	cska.bg
4	DF	(Bulgaria)	Bozhidar Chorbadzhiyski	24	EU	(Romania) FCSB	Loan return	Winter	2022		
21	MF	(Ghana)	Edwin Gyasi	28	EU	(United States) FC Dallas	Loan return	Winter	2020		
29	FW	(Bulgaria)	Tonislav Yordanov	21	EU	(Bulgaria) Litex Lovech	Loan return	Winter	2022		
24	MF	(Italy)	Stefano Beltrame	26	EU	(Italy) Juventus	Transfer	Winter	2021	Undisclosed	cska.bg
5	MF	(Netherlands)	Vurnon Anita	30	EU	(England) Leeds United	Transfer	Winter	2020	Free	cska.bg
27	MF	(Bulgaria)	Martin Smolenski	17	EU	(Bulgaria) Litex Lovech	Loan return	Winter		Free	dsport.bg

=== Out ===
No.	Pos.	Nat.	Name	Age	EU	Moving to	Type	Transfer window	Transfer fee	Source
1	GK	(Croatia)	Dante Stipica	28	EU	(Poland) Pogoń Szczecin	Released	Summer	Free	cska.bg
7	MF	(Guinea-Bissau)	Jorginho	23	EU	(France) Saint-Étienne	Loan return	Summer	Free	cska.bg
12	GK	(Bulgaria)	Slavi Petrov	20	EU	(Bulgaria) Strumska Slava	Released	Summer	Free	sportal.bg
14	DF	(Bulgaria)	Angel Lyaskov	21	EU	(Bulgaria) Botev Vratsa	Loan	Summer	Free	cska.bg
18	MF	(Bulgaria)	Aleksandar Georgiev	21	EU	(Bulgaria) Arda Kardzhali	Released	Summer	Free	sportal.bg
22	MF	(Bulgaria)	Nikola Kolev	23	EU	(Bulgaria) Etar Veliko Tarnovo	Released	Summer	Free	sportal.bg
25	RB	(Cape Verde)	Steven Pereira	25	EU	(Portugal) Santa Clara	Released	Summer	Free	cska.bg
33	GK	(Bulgaria)	Georgi Kitanov	24	EU	(Romania) Astra Giurgiu	Released	Summer	Free	sportal.bg
8	MF	(Ghana)	Edwin Gyasi	28	EU	(United States) FC Dallas	Loan	Summer	Undisclosed	cska.bg
1	GK	(Bulgaria)	Petar Petrov	20	EU	(Bulgaria) Litex Lovech	Transfer	Summer	Free	
4	DF	(Bulgaria)	Bozhidar Chorbadzhiyski	24	EU	(Romania) FCSB	Loan	Summer	€50,000	cska.bg
21	MF	(Italy)	Diego Fabbrini	29	EU	(Romania) Dinamo București	Transfer	Summer	Free	cska.bg
5	DF	(Bulgaria)	Nikolay Bodurov	33	EU	(Iran) Esteghlal	Released	Winter	Free	cska.bg
2	DF	(Bulgaria)	Stoycho Atanasov	22	EU	(Bulgaria) Arda Kardzhali	Transfer	Winter	€50,000	cska.bg
23	MF	(Bulgaria)	Mitko Mitkov	19	EU	(Bulgaria) Dunav Ruse	Loan	Winter	Free	dsport.bg
9	FW	(Scotland)	Tony Watt	26	EU	(Scotland) Motherwell	Released	Winter	Free	cska.bg
16	MF	(Portugal)	Janio Bikel	24	EU	(United States) Vancouver Whitecaps	Transfer	Winter	€455,000	cska.bg
27	MF	(Bulgaria)	Martin Smolenski	16	EU	(Bulgaria) Litex Lovech	Loan	Winter	Free	cska.bg
29	FW	(Bulgaria)	Tonislav Yordanov	21	EU	(Bulgaria) Etar Veliko Tarnovo	Loan	Winter	Free	cska.bg
24	DF	(Portugal)	Nuno Tomás	24	EU	(Finland) KuPS	Loan	Winter	Free	dsport.bg
25	DF	(Spain)	Raúl Albentosa	31	EU	(Romania) Dinamo București	Released	Winter	Free	cska.bg
5	MF	(Netherlands)	Vurnon Anita	31	EU	(Netherlands) RKC Waalwijk	Released	Winter	Free	dsport.bg
7	MF	(Russia)	Denis Davydov	25	Non-EU	(Russia) Tom Tomsk	Released	Winter	Free	dsport.bg
14	MF	(England)	Viv Solomon-Otabor	24	EU	(England) Wigan Athletic	Released	Winter	Free	cska.bg

== Preseason and friendlies ==
Win Draw Loss Fixtures

=== Preseason ===
18 June 2019 Friendly	CSKA	3−0	Lokomotiv Gorna Oryahovitsa	Teteven, Bulgaria
11:00 EEST	Sowe 56'; Bikel 79'; Sandov 84' (o.g.)	Report		Stadium: Stadion Georgi Benkovski

24 June 2019 Friendly	CSKA (Bulgaria)	3−0	(Czech Republic) Příbram	Bruck, Austria
18:00 EEST	Sowe 11'; Henrique 41'; Fabbrini 79'	Report		Stadium: Sportplatz Bruck

27 June 2019 Friendly	CSKA (Bulgaria)	0−1	(Hungary) Ferencváros	Hochfilzen, Austria
19:00 EEST		Report	Nguen 71'	Stadium: Stadion Hochfilzen

30 June 2019 Friendly	CSKA (Bulgaria)	0−1	(Ukraine) Shakhtar Donetsk	Grödig, Austria
12:00 EEST		Report	Sikan 10'	Stadium: Untersberg-Arena

3 July 2019 Friendly	CSKA (Bulgaria)	1−0	(Austria) Red Bull Salzburg	Saalfelden, Austria
19:30 EEST	Evandro 35'	Report	Prevljak (penalty missed) 62'	Stadium: Sportplatz Bürgerau

6 July 2019 Friendly	CSKA	3−0	Vihren	Sofia, Bulgaria
19:00 EEST	Carey 27'; Sowe 53'; Pinto 83'	Report		Stadium: Stadion Balgarska Armiya; Referee: Petar Grigorov (Sofia)

=== On-season (autumn) ===
7 September 2019 Friendly	CSKA	1−0	Pomorie	Straldzha, Bulgaria
17:00 EEST	Sowe 67'	Report		Stadium: Gradski stadion

12 October 2019 Friendly	Pirin	1−3	CSKA	Blagoevgrad, Bulgaria
16:30 EEST	Meledje 21'	Report	Evandro 10', 52'; Galabov 30'	Stadium: Stadion Hristo Botev

24 October 2019 Friendly	CSKA	3−1	Kariana	Pancharevo, Bulgaria
16:00 EEST	Tiago 35', 72'; Sowe 90' (pen.)	Report	Todorov 32'	Stadium: Sporten kompleks Pancharevo

16 November 2019 Friendly	Aris (Greece)	2−0	(Bulgaria) CSKA	Thessaloniki, Greece
15:30 EET	Mancini 19'; Tonso 37'	Report		Stadium: Stadio Kleanthis Vikelidis

=== Mid-season ===
16 January 2020 Friendly	CSKA (Bulgaria)	4−0	(Kazakhstan) Caspiy	Antalya, Turkey
15:30 EET	Sowe 35', 39'; Albentosa 61'; Nabihanov 68' (o.g.)	Report		Stadium: Aqua Sports Center Side

21 January 2020 Friendly	CSKA (Bulgaria)	0−5	(Germany) 1. FC Nürnberg	Marbella, Spain
17:00 EET		Report	Lohkemper 29', 33'; Carey 66' (o.g.); Frey 72'; Geis 90+1' (pen.)	Stadium: Marbella Football Center

26 January 2020 Friendly	CSKA (Bulgaria)	0−1	(Japan) Shonan Bellmare	Benahavís, Spain
17:00 EET		Report	Saka 71'	Stadium: La Quinta Football Fields

29 January 2020 Friendly	CSKA (Bulgaria)	0−0	(South Korea) Jeonbuk Hyundai Motors	Marbella, Spain
17:00 EET		Report		Stadium: Marbella Football Center S1

31 January 2020 Friendly	CSKA (Bulgaria)	0−3	(Czech Republic) Viktoria Plzeň	Estepona, Spain
17:00 EET		Report	Kovařík 39', 47'; Alvir 66'	Stadium: Arroyo Enmedio Pitch

1 February 2020 Friendly	CSKA (Bulgaria)	0−2	(Czech Republic) Jablonec	Marbella, Spain
18:15 EET		Report	Kubista 6'; Jovović 35'	Stadium: Marbella Football Center S1

8 February 2020 Friendly	CSKA	2−0	Strumska Slava	Sofia, Bulgaria
14:45 EET	Beltrame 44'; Pinto 79' (pen.)	Report		Stadium: Stadion Balgarska Armia

=== On-season (spring) ===
30 May 2020 Friendly	CSKA	2−0	Botev Vratsa	Sofia, Bulgaria
17:00 EEST	Juric 77' (pen.); Carey 79'	Report		Stadium: Stadion Balgarska Armia

== Competitions ==
=== Parva Liga ===
==== Regular Stage ====
===== League table =====
Pos	Team	Pld	W	D	L	GF	GA	GD	Pts	Qualification
1	Ludogorets Razgrad	26	18	8	0	46	12	+34	62	Qualification for the Championship round
2	Lokomotiv Plovdiv	26	14	8	4	49	23	+26	50 (Note: Head-to-head points (GD): Lokomotiv Plovdiv 4, CSKA Sofia 1.)	Qualification for the Championship round
3	CSKA Sofia	26	14	8	4	41	17	+24	50	Qualification for the Championship round
4	Levski Sofia	26	14	7	5	43	19	+24	49	Qualification for the Championship round
5	Slavia Sofia	26	13	6	7	36	28	+8	45	Qualification for the Championship round

Source: Soccerway
Rules for classification: 1) Points; 2) Head-to-head points; 3) Head-to-head goal difference; 4) Head-to-head goals scored; 5) Head-to-head away goals scored (only if two teams); 6) Goal difference; 7) Goals scored; 8) Fairplay ranking; 9) Draw.

===== Results summary =====
Overall								Home						Away					
Pld	W	D	L	GF	GA	GD	Pts	W	D	L	GF	GA	GD	W	D	L	GF	GA	GD
26	14	8	4	41	17	+24	50	8	4	1	25	10	+15	6	4	3	16	7	+9

Last updated: 14 June 2020.
Source: See results

===== Results by round =====
Round	1	2	3	4	5	6	7	8	9	10	11	12	13	14	15	16	17	18	19	20	21	22	23	24	25	26
Ground	H	H	A	H	A	H	A	H	A	H	A	H	A	A	A	H	A	H	A	H	A	H	A	H	A	H
Result	D	L	W	W	D	W	D	D	W	W	L	W	L	W	W	W	W	D	D	W	D	W	L	W	W	D
Position	7	11	7	6	7	5	5	4	4	4	4	4	4	4	4	4	4	4	4	4	4	4	4	4	3	3

Updated to match(es) played on 14 June 2020. Source: See Results
A = Away; H = Home; W = Win; D = Draw; L = Loss

===== Results =====
12 July 2019 1	CSKA	2−2	Etar	Sofia
21:00 EEST	Sowe 4' (pen.); Mitkov 73'; Pinto (yellow card) 86'	Report	Iliev (yellow card) 26'; Mladenov 57', 78'; Apostolov (yellow card) 67'; Bojaj (yellow card) 89'; Ivanov (yellow card) 90+2'	Stadium: Stadion Balgarska Armiya; Attendance: 1,800; Referee: Stefan Apostolov (Simitli); Man of the Match: Daniel Mladenov

20 July 2019 2	CSKA	1−3	Cherno More	Sofia
18:45 EEST	Evandro (yellow card) 27'; Atanasov (yellow card) 39'; Tiago (yellow card) 67'; Watt 74', (yellow card) 74'	Report	Rodrigo (yellow card) 19', (goal) 37' (pen.), 60'; Isa 23'; Popov (yellow card) 33' (yellow-red card) 88'; Andrade (yellow card) 40'; Panayotov (yellow card) 61'; N'Dongala (yellow card) 76'; Panov (yellow card) 76'	Stadium: Stadion Balgarska Armiya; Attendance: 1,600; Referee: Georgi Kabakov (Plovdiv); Man of the Match: Rodrigo Henrique

28 July 2019 3	Slavia	1−2	CSKA	Sofia
21:00 EEST	Dyulgerov (yellow card) 36'; Karabelyov 60'; Patev (yellow card) 84'	Report	Chorbadzhiyski (yellow card) 41'; Fabbrini (yellow card) 60'; Evandro 69', 87'; Malinov (yellow card) 87'	Stadium: Stadion Slavia; Attendance: 1,400; Referee: Stanislav Todorov (Shumen); Man of the Match: Evandro

4 August 2019 4	CSKA	1−0	Botev Vratsa	Sofia
18:45 EEST	Evandro (yellow card) 56', (goal) 71'; Turitsov (yellow card) 60'	Report	Gadzhev (yellow card) 36'; Zlatinski (yellow card) 39'; Domovchiyski (yellow card) 56'; Genov (yellow card) 64'; Žderić (yellow card) 73' (yellow-red card) 85'; Valchev (yellow card) 86'	Stadium: Stadion Balgarska Armiya; Attendance: 2,100; Referee: Georgi Davidov (Veliko Tarnovo); Man of the Match: Evandro

11 August 2019 5	Ludogorets	0−0	CSKA	Razgrad
20:30 EEST	Keșerü (yellow card) 77'; Wanderson (yellow card) 82'	Report	Tiago (yellow card) 45'; Fabbrini (yellow card) 83'	Stadium: Ludogorets Arena; Attendance: 5,300; Referee: Dragomir Draganov (Varna); Man of the Match: Plamen Iliev

18 August 2019 6	CSKA	3−2	Arda	Sofia
18:00 EEST	Watt 15'; Evandro 63'; Sowe 89'; Černiauskas (yellow card) 90+2'	Report	Vasilev 19'; Krumov (yellow card) 32'; Martinov (yellow card) 49'; Lozev (yellow card) 57'; Kokonov 90+1'; Sam (yellow card) 90+2'	Stadium: Stadion Balgarska Armiya; Attendance: 1,700; Referee: Georgi Nikolov (Sofia); Man of the Match: Tony Watt

25 August 2019 7	Dunav	1−1	CSKA	Ruse
18:00 EEST	Hristov 41'; Isaevski (yellow card) 48'; Ahmedov (yellow card) 49'; Dimov (yellow card) 70'; Inkoom (yellow card) 86'; Nikolov (yellow card) 90'	Report	Sowe (yellow card) 35'; Evandro 68'	Stadium: Gradski stadion Attendance: 2,967; Referee: Nikola Popov (Sofia); Man of the Match: Evandro

1 September 2019 8	CSKA	2−2	Levski	Sofia
17:45 EEST	Evandro 73', (yellow card) 83'; Carey (yellow card) 75'; Albentosa (yellow card) 78', (goal) 88'; Bikel (yellow card) 82'	Report	S. Ivanov 12'; Robertha 18'; Thiam (yellow card) 68'; Milanov (yellow card) 90+4'	Stadium: Natsionalen stadion Vasil Levski; Attendance: 14,200; Referee: Georgi Kabakov (Plovdiv); Man of the Match: Graham Carey

14 September 2019 9	Botev Plovdiv	0−1	CSKA	Plovdiv
17:30 EEST	Terziev (yellow card) 20'; Vutov (yellow card) 85'	Report	Sowe 75'	Stadium: Futbolen complex Botev 1912; Attendance: 3,000; Referee: Georgi Davidov (Veliko Tarnovo); Man of the Match: Ali Sowe

20 September 2019 10	CSKA	3−0	Tsarsko Selo	Sofia
20:00 EEST	Sowe 48'; Tiago 75'; Geferson 80'	Report	Anderson (yellow card) 23'; Daskalov (yellow card) 50'; Kavdanski (yellow card) 87'	Stadium: Stadion Balgarska Armiya; Attendance: 1,200; Referee: Stanimir Trenchev (Sofia); Man of the Match: Ali Sowe

29 September 2019 11	Beroe	2−1	CSKA	Stara Zagora
20:30 EEST	Conté 31'; Alkan (yellow card) 38'; Bandalovski (yellow card) 45+3'; Brígido 78'; Perniš (yellow card) 90+3'	Report	Carey (yellow card) 72'; Sowe 90'	Stadium: Stadion Beroe; Attendance: 4,000; Referee: Dragomir Draganov (Varna); Man of the Match: Rúben Brígido

5 October 2019 12	CSKA	4−0	Vitosha	Sofia
20:00 EEST	Watt 4'; Albentosa 19'; Malinov 39'; Evandro 74'	Report	Gochev (yellow card) 22'	Stadium: Stadion Balgarska Armiya; Attendance: 720; Referee: Georgi Ivanov (Sofia); Man of the Match: Kristiyan Malinov

20 October 2019 13	Lokomotiv	1−0	CSKA	Plovdiv
17:45 EEST	Tomašević 16', (yellow card) 37' (yellow-red card) 82'; Vitanov (yellow card) 71'; Lukov (yellow card) 90+4'	Report	Galabov (yellow card) 57'; Carey (yellow card) 66'; Antov (yellow card) 79'; Zanev (yellow card) 90'	Stadium: Stadion Lokomotiv; Attendance: 4,500; Referee: Stanislav Todorov (Shumen); Man of the Match: Martin Lukov

30 October 2019 14	Etar	0−4	CSKA	Veliko Tarnovo
18:30 EEST	Stanoev (yellow card) 22'; Iliev (yellow card) 25' (yellow-red card) 54'; Bojaj (yellow card) 69'; Hubchev (yellow card) 79'; Dyulgerov (yellow card) 83'	Report	Galabov (yellow card) 32'; Zanev (yellow card) 36', (goal) 81'; Evandro 63'; Sowe 68'; Tiago (yellow card) 72'; Solomon-Otabor 74'	Stadium: Stadion Ivaylo; Attendance: 2,500; Referee: Ivaylo Stoyanov (Petrich); Man of the Match: Petar Zanev

5 November 2019 15	Cherno More	0−2	CSKA	Varna
17:30 EET	Andrade (yellow card) 16'; Kiki (yellow card) 45'; Popov (yellow card) 60'; Yanchev (yellow card) 75'; Panayotov (yellow card) 79'	Report	Evandro (yellow card) 13'; Sowe (yellow card) 30', (goal) 90+2'; Kruščić (yellow card) 63'; Mazikou (yellow card) 66'; Geferson (yellow card) 78'; Pinto (yellow card) 79'; Malinov 88'	Stadium: Stadion Ticha; Attendance: 6,700; Referee: Nikolay Yordanov (Sofia); Man of the Match: Kristiyan Malinov

9 November 2019 16	CSKA	1−0	Slavia	Sofia
17:30 EET	Zanev (yellow card) 45+1'; Sowe 66'; Albentosa (yellow card) 75'; Busatto (yellow card) 90+6'	Report	Karabelyov (yellow card) 65'; Gamakov (yellow card) 65'; Shokolarov (yellow card) 87' (red card) 88'	Stadium: Stadion Balgarska Armiya; Attendance: 1,900; Referee: Dragomir Draganov (Varna); Man of the Match: Ali Sowe

23 November 2019 17	Botev Vratsa	0−3	CSKA	Vratsa
15:00 EET	Kerchev (yellow card) 24'; Milanov (yellow card) 60'; Gadzhev (yellow card) 77'	Report	Galabov 7'; Tiago 18', 90+2'; Pinto (yellow card) 35'; Antov (yellow card) 77'	Stadium: Stadion Hristo Botev; Attendance: 4,400; Referee: Nikola Popov (Sofia); Man of the Match: Plamen Galabov

1 December 2019 18	CSKA	0−0	Ludogorets	Sofia
18:00 EET	Albentosa (yellow card) 12'; Tiago (yellow card) 36'; Galabov (yellow card) 72'; Geferson (yellow card) 89'	Report	Anicet (yellow card) 25'; Forster (yellow card) 33'; Tchibota (yellow card) 38'; Keșerü (yellow card) 49'; Wanderson (yellow card) 90'	Stadium: Stadion Balgarska Armiya; Attendance: 9,000; Referee: Nikolay Yordanov (Sofia); Man of the Match: Plamen Iliev

8 December 2019 19	Arda	0−0	CSKA	Plovdiv
14:15 EET	Kokonov (yellow card) 11'; Amorim (yellow card) 45+1'; Krumov (yellow card) 66'; Hristov (yellow card) 90+1'	Report	Mazikou (yellow card) 19'; Geferson (yellow card) 34'; Pinto (yellow card) 90'	Stadium: Stadion Lokomotiv; Attendance: 820; Referee: Petar Kirilov (Dobrich); Man of the Match: Gustavo Busatto

14 December 2019 20	CSKA	4−0	Dunav	Sofia
16:50 EET	Tiago 31'; Sowe 59'; Turitsov (yellow card) 62'; Carey 68'; Pinto 73'	Report	Shterev (yellow card) 21'; Varbanov (yellow card) 32'	Stadium: Stadion Balgarska Armiya; Attendance: 850; Referee: Stanimir Trenchev (Sofia); Man of the Match: Rúben Pinto
Note: The game was scheduled for a 16:30 start, but started with a 20 minute delay due to a power outage.

15 February 2020 21	Levski	0−0	CSKA	Sofia
14:45 EET	Paulinho (yellow card) 31'; Reis (yellow card) 40' (yellow-red card) 75'; Milanov (yellow card) 52'	Report	Malinov (yellow card) 18'; Kruščić (yellow card) 22'; Antov (yellow card) 24'; Bikel (yellow card) 90'; Juric (yellow card) 90+3'; Zanev (yellow card) 90+5' (red card) 90+5'	Stadium: Natsionalen stadion Vasil Levski; Attendance: 25,255; Referee: Georgi Kabakov (Plovdiv); Man of the Match: Valentin Antov

22 February 2020 22	CSKA	1−0	Botev Plovdiv	Sofia
16:30 EET	Beltrame 34', (yellow card) 59'	Report	Shopov (yellow card) 13'; A. Tonev (yellow card) 55'; Pirgov (yellow card) 60'	Stadium: Stadion Balgarska Armiya; Attendance: 1,800; Referee: Georgi Dimitrov (Sofia); Man of the Match: Stefano Beltrame

29 February 2020 23	Tsarsko Selo	2−1	CSKA	Bistritsa
17:30 EET	Anderson 6'; Bahamboula 42' (yellow card) 43'; Daskalov (yellow card) 59'; Budinov (yellow card) 82'; Ivanov (yellow card) 88'; Placide (yellow card) 90+2'	Report	Beltrame 20'; Galabov (yellow card) 57'	Stadium: Stadion Bistritsa; Attendance: 1,100; Referee: Nikolay Yordanov (Sofia); Man of the Match: Dylan Bahamboula

7 March 2020 24	CSKA	2−0	Beroe	Sofia
17:30 EET	Anita (yellow card) 21'; Carey 59', 72'	Report	Octávio (yellow card) 18'; Angelov (yellow card) 23'; Mézague (yellow card) 31'; Furtado (yellow card) 45'; Stoyanov (yellow card) 51'; D. Dimitrov (yellow card) 82'	Stadium: Stadion Balgarska Armiya; Attendance: 800; Referee: Ivaylo Stoyanov (Petrich); Man of the Match: Graham Carey

6 June 2020 25	Vitosha	0−1	CSKA	Bistritsa
21:00 EEST	Krastev (yellow card) 24'; Dinev (yellow card) 41'; Amzin (yellow card) 56'; Zyumbulev (yellow card) 71'; Dyakov (yellow card) 76'; Kutev (yellow card) 89'	Report	Sowe (penalty missed) 25'; Pinto (yellow card) 63'; Ahmedov (yellow card) 73'; Evandro 86'	Stadium: Stadion Bistritsa; Attendance: 550; Referee: Radoslav Gidzhenov (Plovdiv); Man of the Match: Evandro
Note: The game was originally scheduled to be played on 15 March 2020. Due to concerns over the coronavirus outbreak it was decided to be played behind closed doors. On 13 March the Bulgarian Football Union postponed all games until 13 April., which was on 6 April extended until 13 May 2020. On 2 June 2020 the Ministry of Health announced that stadiums are allowed to host spectators up to 30% of their total capacity.

14 June 2020 26	CSKA	1−1	Lokomotiv	Sofia
21:00 EEST	Malinov (yellow card) 67'; Turitsov (yellow card) 68'; Tiago 83'; Zanev (yellow card) 90'; Carey (yellow card) 90+4'	Report	Lucas 4'; Almeida (yellow card) 49'; Petrović (yellow card) 52' (yellow-red card) 66'	Stadium: Stadion Balgarska Armiya; Attendance: 2,500; Referee: Stanislav Todorov (Shumen); Man of the Match: Tiago Rodrigues
Note: The match was to be originally played on 21 March 2020, but was postponed due to concerns over the coronavirus outbreak. On 12 June 2020 the Ministry of Health announced that stadiums are allowed to host spectators up to 50% of their total capacity.

==== Championship round ====
===== League table =====
Pos	Team	Pld	W	D	L	GF	GA	GD	Pts	Qualification
1	Ludogorets Razgrad (C)	31	21	9	1	59	18	+41	72	Qualification for the Champions League first qualifying round
2	CSKA Sofia	31	16	11	4	52	22	+30	59	Qualification for the Europa League first qualifying round
3	Slavia Sofia (O)	31	16	7	8	42	32	+10	55	Qualification for the European play-off final
4	Levski Sofia	31	15	8	8	50	30	+20	53 (Note: Head-to-head points in the regular season: Levski 4, Lokomotiv Plovdiv 1.)	
5	Lokomotiv Plovdiv	31	15	8	8	53	35	+18	53	Qualification for the Europa League first qualifying round (Note: Lokomotiv Plovdiv qualified for the Europa League first qualifying round by winning the 2019–20 Bulgarian Cup.)
6	Beroe	31	16	1	14	50	43	+7	49	

Source: Soccerway
Rules for classification: 1) Points; 2) Head-to-head points; 3) Head-to-head goal difference; 4) Head-to-head goals scored; 5) Head-to-head away goals scored (only if two teams); 6) Goal difference; 7) Goals scored; 8) Fairplay ranking; 9) Draw.
(C) Champions; (O) Play-off winners

===== Results summary =====
Overall								Home						Away					
Pld	W	D	L	GF	GA	GD	Pts	W	D	L	GF	GA	GD	W	D	L	GF	GA	GD
5	2	3	0	11	5	+6	9	1	2	0	9	4	+5	1	1	0	2	1	+1

Last updated: 12 July 2020.
Source: See results

===== Results by round =====
Round	1	2	3	4	5
Ground	H	A	H	A	H
Result	D	D	D	W	W
Position	2	3	3	2	2

Updated to match(es) played on 12 July 2020. Source: See Results
A = Away; H = Home; W = Win; D = Draw; L = Loss

===== Results =====
20 June 2020 27	CSKA	3−3	Levski	Sofia
16:15 EEST	Kargas 16' (o.g.); Busatto (yellow card) 34'; Antov (yellow card) 38'; Carey 58' (pen.); Galabov (yellow card) 69'; Kruščić (yellow card) 70'; Pinto (yellow card) 74'; Sowe 88'	Report	Alar (yellow card) 16'; Nascimento (yellow card) 16'; Kargas (yellow card) 19'; Goranov 35' (pen.); Thiam 45+3'; Eyjólfsson (yellow card) 57'; Slavchev 62', (yellow card) 70'; Naydenov (yellow card) 86'	Stadium: Natsionalen stadion Vasil Levski; Attendance: 14,000; Referee: Georgi Kabakov (Plovdiv); Man of the Match: Ali Sowe
Note: According to a regulation from 12 June 2020, issued by the Ministry of Health, stadiums are allowed to host spectators up to 50% of their total capacity.

27 June 2020 28	Slavia	0−0	CSKA	Sofia
18:45 EEST	K. Krastev (yellow card) 72'	Report	Geferson (yellow card) 66'; Pinto (yellow card) 74'	Stadium: Stadion Slavia; Attendance: 700; Referee: Ivaylo Stoyanov (Petrich); Man of the Match: Plamen Galabov
Note: According to a regulation, issued on 23 June 2020 by the Ministry of Health, stadiums are allowed to host up to 50% of its capacity, but no more than 1,000 spectators per block.

5 July 2020 29	CSKA	1−1	Ludogorets	Sofia
21:00 EEST	Tiago (yellow card) 49'; Ahmedov (yellow card) 53'; Sowe 62'; Carey (yellow card) 70'	Report	Cicinho (yellow card) 8'; Biton 71'	Stadium: Stadion Balgarska Armia; Attendance: 1,400; Referee: Nikola Popov (Sofia); Man of the Match: Ali Sowe
Note: According to a regulation, issued on 23 June 2020 by the Ministry of Health, stadiums are allowed to host up to 50% of its capacity, but no more than 1,000 spectators per block.

9 July 2020 30	Lokomotiv	1−2	CSKA	Plovdiv
20:30 EEST	Pugliese (yellow card) 38'; Nikolaev (yellow card) 41'; Salinas 61'; Akinyemi (yellow card) 70'; Lukov (yellow card) 90+4'	Report	Geferson (yellow card) 34'; Galabov (yellow card) 37'; Tiago 80' (pen.); Sowe 90+5'	Stadium: Stadion Lokomotiv; Attendance: no spectators Referee: Ivaylo Stoyanov (Petrich); Man of the Match: Tiago Rodrigues
Note: The game will be played behind closed doors due to a spike of COVID-19-related infections in Bulgaria.

12 July 2020 31	CSKA	5−0	Beroe	Sofia
21:00 EEST	Evandro 4'; Antov 24'; Tiago (yellow card) 27', (goal) 70' (pen.), 77'; Malinov (yellow card) 32'; Sowe 81'	Report	Mézague (yellow card) 39'; Stoyanov (yellow card) 40'	Stadium: Stadion Balgarska Armia; Attendance: no spectators Referee: Georgi Davidov (Veliko Tarnovo); Man of the Match: Valentin Antov
Note: On 9 July 2020 the Ministry of Health announced that the stadiums are not allowed to host spectators due to a recent spike of COVID-19-related infections in Bulgaria. All games will be played behind closed doors until further notice.

=== Bulgarian Cup ===
24 September 2019 First Round	Lokomotiv Gorna Oryahovitsa	0−3	CSKA	Gorna Oryahovitsa
18:30 EEST		Report	Davydov 20'; Watt 55', 62'	Stadium: Stadion Lokomotiv; Attendance: 1,600; Referee: Dimo Dimov (Sliven)

5 December 2019 Second Round	Arda	0−1	CSKA	Kardzhali
13:30 EET	Delev (yellow card) 6'; Hassani (yellow card) 14' (yellow-red card) 66'; Kokonov (yellow card) 37'; Georgiev (yellow card) 73'; Krumov (yellow card) 73'	Report	Sowe 2', (red card) 66'; Galabov (yellow card) 21'; Tiago (yellow card) 39'	Stadium: Arena Arda; Attendance: 3,600; Referee: Ivaylo Stoyanov (Petrich)

3 March 2020 Quarter-final	CSKA	2−1	Botev Vratsa	Sofia
18:00 EET	Gyasi (yellow card) 34', (goal) 67'; Zanev (yellow card) 38'; Anita (yellow card) 87'; Ahmedov 89'	Report	Genov 22'; Ivaylov (yellow card) 24'; Vasev (yellow card) 43'; Uzunov (yellow card) 71'; Kostov (yellow card) 75'; Gadzhev (yellow card) 90+2'	Stadium: Stadion Balgarska Armia; Attendance: 1,600; Referee: Vladimir Valkov (Plovdiv)

10 June 2020 Semi-final Leg 1	Botev Plovdiv	0−0	CSKA	Plovdiv
21:00 EEST	Terziev (yellow card) 34'; Filipov (yellow card) 89' (yellow-red card) 90+1'	Report	Malinov (yellow card) 49'; Kruščić (yellow card) 83'	Stadium: Futbolen kompleks Botev 1912; Attendance: 1,100; Referee: Nikolay Yordanov (Sofia)
Note: The match was to be originally played between 7 and 9 April 2020, but it was postponed due to concerns over the coronavirus outbreak. According to regulation from 2 June 2020., issued by the Ministry of Health, stadiums are allowed to host spectators up to 30% of their total capacity.

24 June 2020 Semi-final Leg 2	CSKA	2−0 (2−0 agg.)	Botev Plovdiv	Sofia
20:30 EEST	Bandalovski 19' (o.g.); Sowe 54'; Pinto (yellow card) 88'; Malinov (yellow card) 90+1'	Report		Stadium: Stadion Balgarska Armia; Attendance: 4,300; Referee: Dragomir Draganov (Varna)
Note: The match was to be originally played between 21 and 23 April 2020, but it was postponed due to concerns over the coronavirus outbreak. On 23 June 2020 the Ministry of Health announced that stadiums are allowed to host up to 50% of its capacity, but no more than 1,000 spectators per block.

1 July 2020 Final	CSKA	0−0 (a.e.t.) (3−5 p)	Lokomotiv Plovdiv	Sofia
19:15 EEST	Malinov (yellow card) 29' (yellow-red card) 115'; Pinto (yellow card) 44'; Antov (yellow card) 46'; Sowe (yellow card) 59'; Zanev (yellow card) 86'	Report	Karagaren (yellow card) 82'; Aralica (yellow card) 90+4'; Lukov (yellow card) 120+1'	Stadium: Natsionalen stadion Vasil Levski; Attendance: 12,000; Referee: Georgi Kabakov (Plovdiv)
	Penalties
	Zanev (penalty scored); Sowe (penalty missed); Geferson (penalty scored); Carey (penalty scored)		(penalty scored) Iliev; (penalty scored) Almeida; (penalty scored) Karagaren; (penalty scored) Malonga; (penalty scored) Tsvetanov
Note: The match was to be originally played on 16 May 2020, but it was postponed due to concerns over the coronavirus outbreak. On 27 June the Bulgarian Football Union announced that it is allowed for the stadium to host up to 30% of its total capacity (i.e. 12,000 spectators) with up to 3,000 spectators per block in accordance to health regulations, issued by the Ministry of Health.

=== UEFA Europa League ===
==== First qualifying round ====
9 July 2019 First leg	CSKA (Bulgaria)	4−0	(Montenegro) Titograd	Sofia, Bulgaria
20:30 EEST	Evandro 40'; Tiago 53'; Geferson 55'; Malinov 72'	Report	Mamadou (yellow card) 32'; Roganović (yellow card) 39'; Djalović (yellow card) 45'	Stadium: Stadion Balgarska Armiya; Attendance: 8,500; Referee: Luís Godinho (Portugal)

16 July 2019 Second leg	Titograd (Montenegro)	0−0 (0−4 agg.)	(Bulgaria) CSKA	Podgorica, Montenegro
21:30 EEST	Banović (yellow card) 34'	Report	Mitkov (yellow card) 68'; Pinto (yellow card) 89'	Stadium: Stadion pod Goricom; Attendance: 969; Referee: Vasilis Dimitriou (Cyprus)

==== Second qualifying round ====
25 July 2019 First leg	CSKA (Bulgaria)	1−0	(Croatia) Osijek	Sofia, Bulgaria
20:30 EEST	Fabbrini (yellow card) 17'; Evandro 53'; Geferson (yellow card) 66'; Antov (yellow card) 71'; Carey (yellow card) 90'	Report	Žaper (yellow card) 21'; Šorša (yellow card) 29'; Bočkaj (yellow card) 58'	Stadium: Stadion Balgarska Armiya; Attendance: 7,500; Referee: Paolo Valeri (Italy)

1 August 2019 Second leg	Osijek (Croatia)	1−0 (a.e.t.) (1−1 agg.) (3−4 p)	(Bulgaria) CSKA	Osijek, Croatia
21:45 EEST	Majstorović 28'; Žaper (yellow card) 50'; Bočkaj (yellow card) 54'; Škorić (yellow card) 60'; Mance (yellow card) 68'	Report	Bodurov (yellow card) 21'; Albentosa (yellow card) 39'; Sowe (yellow card) 51'	Stadium: Stadion Gradski vrt Attendance: 7,214; Referee: Robert Schörgenhofer (Austria)
	Penalties
	Lyopa (penalty scored); Bočkaj (penalty missed); Škorić (penalty missed); Pilj (penalty scored); Marić (penalty scored)		(penalty scored) Tiago; (penalty scored) Carey; (penalty missed) Geferson; (penalty scored) Bodurov; (penalty scored) Sowe

==== Third qualifying round ====
8 August 2019 First leg	CSKA (Bulgaria)	1−1	(Ukraine) Zorya Luhansk	Sofia, Bulgaria
20:30 EEST	Evandro 13'; Bikel (yellow card) 33'; Malinov (yellow card) 41'; Fabbrini (yellow card) 75'	Report	Yurchenko 45+1' (pen.); Tymchyk (yellow card) 61'; Abu Hanna (yellow card) 74'	Stadium: Natsionalen stadion Vasil Levski; Attendance: 15,310; Referee: Sandro Schärer (Switzerland)

15 August 2019 Second leg	Zorya Luhansk (Ukraine)	1−0 (2−1 agg.)	(Bulgaria) CSKA	Zaporizhia, Ukraine
20:00 EEST	Khomchenovskyi (yellow card) 21'; Yurchenko (yellow card) 29'; Budkivskyi (yellow card) 45'; Rusyn (yellow card) 68' (yellow-red card) 90', (goal) 89'; Shevchenko (yellow card) 90+2'	Report	Turitsov (yellow card) 15' (red card) 22'	Stadium: Slavutych-Arena; Attendance: 7,857; Referee: Amaury Delerue (France)

== Statistics ==
=== Appearances and goals ===
As of 12 July 2020

No.	Pos	Player	Parva Liga		Bulgarian Cup		Europa League		Total	
No.	Pos	Player	Apps	Goals	Apps	Goals	Apps	Goals	Apps	Goals
1	GK	(Bulgaria) Iliya Shalamanov	0	0	0	0	0	0	0	0
3	DF	(Brazil) Geferson	9+10	1	1+3	0	6	1	29	2
4	DF	(Bulgaria) Bozhidar Chorbadzhiyski	3	0	0	0	0+1	0	4	0
5	MF	(Bulgaria) Yoan Baurenski	0+1	0	0	0	0	0	1	0
6	MF	(Portugal) Rúben Pinto	15+4	1	4+1	0	1+1	0	26	1
8	MF	(Republic of Ireland) Graham Carey	16+9	4	4	0	2+3	0	34	4
9	FW	(Australia) Tomi Juric	0+7	0	0+1	0	0	0	8	0
10	FW	(Brazil) Evandro	22+8	10	5	0	5	3	40	13
11	DF	(Bulgaria) Petar Zanev	26	1	5	0	4+1	0	36	1
13	GK	(Brazil) Gustavo Busatto	24	-11	6	-1	0	0	30	-12
15	MF	(Bulgaria) Kristiyan Malinov	21+6	2	5+1	0	5+1	1	39	3
17	FW	(Brazil) Henrique	4+7	0	0+4	0	0	0	15	0
18	DF	(Republic of the Congo) Bradley Mazikou	23+2	0	6	0	0	0	31	0
19	DF	(Bulgaria) Ivan Turitsov	19	0	4	0	2+1	0	26	0
20	MF	(Portugal) Tiago Rodrigues	18+6	8	3+2	0	5	1	34	9
21	MF	(Ghana) Edwin Gyasi	6+3	0	1	1	0	0	10	1
22	FW	(The Gambia) Ali Sowe	27+3	13	5	2	5+1	0	41	15
23	FW	(Bulgaria) Ahmed Ahmedov	2+4	0	0+3	1	0	0	9	1
24	MF	(Italy) Stefano Beltrame	6+1	2	2+2	0	0	0	11	2
26	DF	(Bulgaria) Valentin Antov	17	1	6	0	1+1	0	25	1
27	MF	(Bulgaria) Martin Smolenski	0+1	0	0	0	0	0	1	0
28	DF	(Bulgaria) Plamen Galabov	17	1	2+1	0	2	0	22	1
30	GK	(Lithuania) Vytautas Černiauskas	7	-11	0	0	6	-3	13	-14
Players away from the club on loan:
23	MF	(Bulgaria) Mitko Mitkov	0+2	1	0	0	0+2	0	4	1
24	DF	(Portugal) Nuno Tomás	4	0	0	0	5	0	9	0
29	FW	(Bulgaria) Tonislav Yordanov	0	0	0	0	0	0	0	0
Players who appeared for CSKA Sofia that left during the season:
2	DF	(Bulgaria) Stoycho Atanasov	2	0	0+1	0	1	0	4	0
5	DF	(Bulgaria) Nikolay Bodurov	2	0	0	0	3	0	5	0
5	MF	(Netherlands) Vurnon Anita	1+1	0	1	0	0	0	3	0
7	MF	(Russia) Denis Davydov	0+3	0	1	1	0	0	4	1
9	FW	(Scotland) Tony Watt	7+8	3	1+1	2	1+2	0	20	5
14	MF	(England) Viv Solomon-Otabor	13+6	1	1+1	0	0+1	0	22	1
16	MF	(Portugal) Janio Bikel	12+2	0	1	0	5+1	0	21	0
21	MF	(Italy) Diego Fabbrini	3+2	0	0	0	4+2	0	11	0
25	DF	(Spain) Raúl Albentosa	15	2	2	0	3	0	20	2

=== Goalscorers ===
Place	Position	Nation	Number	Name	Parva Liga	Bulgarian Cup	Europa League	Total
1	FW	(The Gambia)	22	Ali Sowe	13	2	0	15
2	FW	(Brazil)	10	Evandro	10	0	3	13
3	MF	(Portugal)	20	Tiago Rodrigues	8	0	1	9
4	FW	(Scotland)	9	Tony Watt	3	2	0	5
5	MF	(Republic of Ireland)	8	Graham Carey	4	0	0	4
6	MF	(Bulgaria)	15	Kristiyan Malinov	2	0	1	3
7	DF	(Brazil)	3	Geferson	1	0	1	2
7	MF	(Italy)	24	Stefano Beltrame	2	0	0	2
7	DF	(Spain)	25	Raúl Albentosa	2	0	0	2
10	MF	(Portugal)	6	Rúben Pinto	1	0	0	1
10	MF	(Russia)	7	Denis Davydov	0	1	0	1
10	DF	(Bulgaria)	11	Petar Zanev	1	0	0	1
10	MF	(England)	14	Viv Solomon-Otabor	1	0	0	1
10	MF	(Netherlands)	21	Edwin Gyasi	0	1	0	1
10	MF	(Bulgaria)	23	Mitko Mitkov	1	0	0	1
10	FW	(Bulgaria)	23	Ahmed Ahmedov	0	1	0	1
10	MF	(Bulgaria)	26	Valentin Antov	1	0	0	1
10	DF	(Bulgaria)	28	Plamen Galabov	1	0	0	1
				Own goal	1	1	0	2
TOTALS					52	8	6	66

As of 12 July 2020

=== Disciplinary record ===
Includes all competitive matches. Players listed below made at least one appearance for CSKA first squad during the season.

N	P	Nat.	Name	Parva Liga			Bulgarian Cup			Europa League			Total			Notes
N	P	Nat.	Name	Yellow card	Second yellow card	Red card	Yellow card	Second yellow card	Red card	Yellow card	Second yellow card	Red card	Yellow card	Second yellow card	Red card	Notes
2	DF	(Bulgaria)	Atanasov	1									1			
3	DF	(Brazil)	Geferson	5						1			6			
4	DF	(Bulgaria)	Chorbadzhiyski	1									1			
5	MF	(Netherlands)	Anita	1			1						2			
5	DF	(Bulgaria)	Bodurov							1			1			
6	MF	(Portugal)	Pinto	8			1			1			10			
8	MF	(Republic of Ireland)	Carey	5						1			6			
9	FW	(Scotland)	Watt	1									1			
9	FW	(Australia)	Juric	1									1			
10	FW	(Brazil)	Evandro	4									4			
11	DF	(Bulgaria)	Zanev	6		1	1						7		1	
13	GK	(Brazil)	Busatto	2									2			
15	MF	(Bulgaria)	Malinov	5	1		2			1			8	1		
16	MF	(Portugal)	Bikel	2						1			3			
18	DF	(Republic of the Congo)	Mazikou	2									2			
19	DF	(Bulgaria)	Turistsov	3						1		1	4		1	
20	MF	(Portugal)	Tiago	6			1						7			
21	MF	(Netherlands)	Gyasi				1						1			
21	MF	(Italy)	Fabbrini	2						2			4			
22	FW	(The Gambia)	Sowe	3					1	1			4		1	
23	MF	(Bulgaria)	Ahmedov	2									2			
23	MF	(Bulgaria)	Mitkov							1			1			
24	MF	(Italy)	Beltrame	1									1			
25	DF	(Spain)	Albentosa	3						1			4			
26	MF	(Bulgaria)	Antov	5						1			6			
28	DF	(Bulgaria)	Galabov	6			1						7			
30	GK	(Lithuania)	Černiauskas	1									1			

Last updated: 12 July 2020
Source: Competitive matches
Only competitive matches
(yellow card) = Number of bookings; (second yellow card) = Number of sending offs after a second yellow card; (red card) = Number of sending offs by a direct red card.

== See also ==
- PFC CSKA Sofia
