= 2023–24 Bulgarian Cup =

Sesame Купа на България

Tournament details
- Country: Bulgaria
- Teams: 48

Final positions
- Champions: Botev Plovdiv (4th title)
- Runners-up: Ludogorets Razgrad

Tournament statistics
- Matches played: 49
- Goals scored: 156 (3.18 per match)
- Top goal scorer(s): (Brazil) Rick (5 goals)
- All statistics correct as of 15 May 2024.

The 2023–24 Bulgarian Cup was the 42nd official edition of the Bulgarian annual football knockout tournament. It was sponsored by Sesame and known as the Sesame Kupa na Bulgaria for sponsorship purposes. The competition began on 9 August 2023 with the preliminary round and finished with the final on 15 May 2024. Ludogorets Razgrad were the defending cup winners and reached the final for the second consecutive year, but were defeated by Botev Plovdiv, who won their fourth cup in history. As winners, Botev qualified for the 2024–25 UEFA Europa League first qualifying round.

== Participating clubs ==
The following 48 teams qualified for the competition:

| 2023–24 First League; 16 clubs | 2023–24 Second League; 16 non-reserve clubs | Winners of 4 regional competitions 16 clubs |
| Arda Kardzhali; Beroe Stara Zagora; Botev Plovdiv; Botev Vratsa; CSKA 1948 Sofia; CSKA Sofia; Cherno More Varna; Etar Veliko Tarnovo; Hebar Pazardzhik; Krumovgrad; Levski Sofia; Lokomotiv Plovdiv; Lokomotiv Sofia; Ludogorets Razgrad; Pirin Blagoevgrad; Slavia Sofia | Bdin Vidin; Belasitsa Petrich; Chernomorets Balchik; Chernomorets Burgas; Dobrudzha Dobrich; Dunav Ruse; Litex Lovech; Marek Dupnitsa; Maritsa Plovdiv; Montana; Septemvri Sofia; Spartak Pleven; Spartak Varna; Sportist Svoge; Strumska Slava Radomir; Yantra Gabrovo | from North-East zone: Chernolomets Popovo; Fratria Varna; Septemvri Tervel; Svetkavitsa Targovishte; from North-West zone: Lokomotiv Gorna Oryahovitsa; Lozen Suhindol; Septemvri Glozhene; Sevlievo; from South-West zone: Balkan Botevgrad; Kyustendil; Metalurg Pernik; Vihren Sandanski; from South-East zone: Nesebar; Rozova Dolina Kazanlak; Sayana Haskovo; Spartak Plovdiv |

== Matches ==
=== Preliminary round ===
The draw was conducted on 25 August 2023. The games were played between 5 and 13 September 2023. In this stage participated the 16 winners from the regional amateur competitions and 16 non-reserve teams from the Second League.

| 5 September 2023 | Kyustendil (III) | 1−1 (a.e.t.) (2−4 p) | Dunav Ruse (II) | Kyustendil |
| 16:00 UTC+3 | Atanasov 28' | Report | Y. Y. Dimitrov 80' | Stadium: Stadion Osogovo; Referee: Lyubomir Vushovski (Sofia) |
| | Penalties |
| | Georgiev (penalty missed); Grozdin (penalty scored); Hristov (penalty scored); Valchinov (penalty missed) | | (penalty scored) Y. Y. Dimitrov; (penalty scored) Georgiev; (penalty scored) Budinov; (penalty scored) Hasan |

| 6 September 2023 | Metalurg Pernik (IV) | 0−1 | Chernomorets Balchik (II) | Pernik |
| 16:00 UTC+3 | | Report | Georgiev 23' | Stadium: Stadion Metalurg; Referee: Antonio Antov (Kyustendil) |

| 6 September 2023 | Rozova Dolina Kazanlak (III) | 0−1 | Bdin Vidin (II) | Kazanlak |
| 16:00 UTC+3 | | Report | Belotti 20' | Stadium: Stadion Sevtopolis; Referee: Georgi Stoyanov (Plovdiv) |

| 6 September 2023 | Svetkavitsa Targovishte (III) | 1−4 | Litex Lovech (II) | Targovishte |
| 16:00 UTC+3 | Iliev 44' (pen.) | Report | Ignatov 9'; Zhabov 16', 89'; Angelov 34' | Stadium: Stadion Dimitar Burkov; Referee: Todor Kirov (Varna) |

| 6 September 2023 | Vihren Sandanski (III) | 4−3 | Marek Dupnitsa (II) | Mikrevo (Note: Vihren plays their preliminary round home match at Stadion Malesh, Mikrevo, instead of their regular stadium Stadion Spartak in Sandanski, which is undergoing renovation works.) |
| 16:00 UTC+3 | Kostov 8'; Yakimov 23'; Dimitrov 29', 52' | Report | Gogov 15', 57' (pen.); Lyubomirov 39' | Stadium: Stadion Malesh; Referee: Georgi Spasov (Sofia) |

| 8 September 2023 | Spartak Varna (II) | 3−1 | Fratria Varna (III) | Varna |
| 19:00 UTC+2 | Ahmedov 23', 37', 68' | Report | Vasin 73' | Stadium: Stadion Spartak; Referee: Kristiyan Todorov (Varna) |
Note: Tie reversed from the original draw.

| 9 September 2023 | Chernolomets Popovo (III) | 0−1 | Dobrudzha Dobrich (II) | Popovo |
| 16:00 UTC+3 | | Report | Manev 44' | Stadium: Stadion Stamo Kostov; Referee: Mihael Pavlov (Veliko Tarnovo) |

| 9 September 2023 | Sayana Haskovo (III) | 0−3 | Yantra Gabrovo (II) | Haskovo |
| 16:00 UTC+3 | | Report | Kazakov 70'; Mladenov 81'; Kolev 90+1' | Stadium: Stadion Haskovo; Referee: Svetoslav Lazarov (Burgas) |

| 9 September 2023 | Septemvri Glozhene (IV) | 0−3 | Spartak Pleven (II) | Glozhene |
| 16:00 UTC+3 | | Report | Hristov 6', 36'; Chernakov 56' | Stadium: Stadion Septemvri; Referee: Myumyun Mehmed (Burgas) |
Note: The game started with 15 minutes delay.

| 9 September 2023 | Septemvri Tervel (III) | 1−0 | Belasitsa Petrich (II) | Tervel |
| 16:00 UTC+3 | Georgiev 39' | Report | | Stadium: Stadion Septemvri; Referee: Krasimir Krastev (Shumen) |

| 12 September 2023 | Balkan Botevgrad (III) | 2−1 (a.e.t.) | Montana (II) | Botevgrad |
| 16:00 UTC+3 | Ganchev 77'; Ivanov 108' | Report | Ejike 61' | Stadium: Stadion Gerena; Referee: Lyuboslav Lyubomirov (Sofia) |

| 12 September 2023 | Lokomotiv Gorna Oryahovitsa (III) | 1−2 | Sportist Svoge (II) | Gorna Oryahovitsa |
| 16:00 UTC+3 | Tsachev 11' | Report | Zhivkov 22'; Ivanov 87' | Stadium: Stadion Lokomotiv; Referee: Denislav Stalev (Plovdiv) |

| 12 September 2023 | Lozen Suhindol (IV) | 0−5 | Strumska Slava Radomir (II) | Suhindol |
| 16:00 UTC+3 | | Report | Mladenov 16'; Yanev 36'; Stoyanov 42'; Zhelev 56'; Asparuhov 84' | Stadium: Stadion Loviko; Referee: Vladimir Kirilov (Pleven) |

| 12 September 2023 | Nesebar (III) | 2−4 | Septemvri Sofia (II) | Nesebar |
| 16:00 UTC+3 | Yanev 38', 71' | Report | Georgiev 10'; Kostadinov 26'; Dimitrov 48'; Petrov 68' | Stadium: Stadion Nesebar; Referee: Kraen Georgiev (Varna) |

| 13 September 2023 | Sevlievo (III) | 1−3 | Chernomorets Burgas (II) | Sevlievo |
| 16:00 UTC+3 | Makaveev 61' | Report | Patev 63'; Ivanov 74'; Petkov 90+1' | Stadium: Stadion Rakovski; Referee: Ivo Isaev (Sofia) |

| 13 September 2023 | Spartak Plovdiv (III) | 0−5 | Maritsa Plovdiv (II) | Plovdiv |
| 16:00 UTC+3 | | Report | Popov 9'; Marchev 12', 18', 41'; Trifonov 83' | Stadium: Stadion Plovdiv (Note: Spartak Plovdiv plays their preliminary round home match at Stadion Plovdiv, Plovdiv, instead of their regular stadium Stadion Todor Diev in Plovdiv, which is undergoing renovation works.); Referee: Mustafa Shefket (Kardzhali) |

=== Round of 32 ===
The draw for this round was conducted on 3 October 2023. The games were played between 14 October and 22 November 2023. The 16 preliminary round winners and the 16 teams from the First League entered this round.

| 14 October 2023 | Dobrudzha Dobrich (II) | 3−4 (a.e.t.) | Lokomotiv Plovdiv (I) | Dobrich |
| 13:30 UTC+3 | Pirgov 7'; Dimitrov 89'; Osman 120' | Report | Dione 41', 98'; Karakashev 47'; Minchev 111' (pen.) | Stadium: Stadion Druzhba; Referee: Mihael Pavlov (Veliko Tarnovo) |

| 14 October 2023 | Septemvri Tervel (III) | 0−4 | Arda Kardzhali (I) | Tervel |
| 15:00 UTC+3 | | Report | Tsonev 21', 35'; Yordanov 47'; Zhekov 89' | Stadium: Stadion Septemvri; Referee: Martin Velikov (Varna) |

| 14 October 2023 | Spartak Pleven (II) | 0−1 | Lokomotiv Sofia (I) | Pleven |
| 15:00 UTC+3 | | Report | Mitkov 45+1' | Stadium: Stadion Pleven; Referee: Stoyan Arsov (Sofia) |

| 14 October 2023 | Sportist Svoge (II) | 0−1 | Hebar Pazardzhik (I) | Svoge |
| 15:00 UTC+3 | | Report | Zbun 58' | Stadium: Stadion Chavdar Tsvetkov; Referee: Vasil Minev (Sofia) |

| 14 October 2023 | Vihren Sandanski (III) | 0−1 | Pirin Blagoevgrad (I) | Sandanski |
| 15:00 UTC+3 | | Report | Tyutyukov 60' | Stadium: Stadion Spartak; Referee: Dimo Dimov (Sliven) |

| 31 October 2023 | Litex Lovech (II) | 1−0 | Cherno More Varna (I) | Lovech |
| 17:30 UTC+2 | Vasilev 68' | Report | | Stadium: Gradski stadion Referee: Stanimir Trenchev (Sofia) |

| 1 November 2023 | Maritsa Plovdiv (II) | 0−1 | CSKA 1948 Sofia (I) | Plovdiv |
| 13:30 UTC+2 | | Report | Rusev 73' | Stadium: Stadion Maritsa; Referee: Vasimir El-Hatib (Sofia) |

| 1 November 2023 | Septemvri Sofia (II) | 5−5 (a.e.t.) (3−4 p) | Botev Vratsa (I) | Sofia |
| 13:30 UTC+2 | Kostadinov 34', 89', 90+1'; Petrov 94'; Dimitrov 104' | Report | Perea 8'; Da Sylva 45'; Luiz Felipe 84'; Panov 92'; Kavdanski 117' | Stadium: Stadion DIT; Referee: Volen Chinkov (Sofia) |
| | Penalties |
| | Kostadinov (penalty scored); A. Georgiev (penalty scored); Dimitrov (penalty missed); Mihaylov (penalty scored); Yordanov (penalty missed) | | (penalty scored) Perea; (penalty scored) Genov; (penalty scored) Tsvetanov; (penalty scored) S. Georgiev |

| 1 November 2023 | Spartak Varna (II) | 1−0 | Krumovgrad (I) | Varna |
| 15:00 UTC+2 | Senhadji 73' (o.g.) | Report | | Stadium: Stadion Spartak; Referee: Georgi Ginchev (Veliko Tarnovo) |

| 8 November 2023 | Strumska Slava Radomir (II) | 0−3 | Botev Plovdiv (I) | Radomir |
| 13:30 UTC+2 | | Report | Sekulić 13', 79' (pen.), 84' | Stadium: Stadion Hristo Radovanov; Referee: Ventsislav Mitrev (Sofia) |

| 9 November 2023 | Chernomorets Balchik (II) | 0−3 | CSKA Sofia (I) | Balchik |
| 17:30 UTC+2 | | Report | Asprilla 2', 42'; Lindseth 89' | Stadium: Stadion Balchik; Referee: Kristiyan Kolev (Plovdiv) |

| 18 November 2023 | Bdin Vidin (II) | 1−2 (a.e.t.) | Beroe Stara Zagora (I) | Vidin |
| 13:30 UTC+2 | Todorov 61' | Report | Ivanov 59' (o.g.); Godoy 105+1' | Stadium: Stadion Georgi Benkovski; Referee: Ivo Andreev (Sofia) |

| 18 November 2023 | Chernomorets Burgas (II) | 2−3 (a.e.t.) | Etar Veliko Tarnovo (I) | Burgas |
| 13:30 UTC+2 | Peychev 37'; Kholod 57' | Report | Boukholda 77', 79', 96' | Stadium: Stadion Lazur; Referee: Krasen Georgiev (Varna) |

| 22 November 2023 | Balkan Botevgrad (III) | 0−4 | Ludogorets Razgrad (I) | Botevgrad |
| 13:30 UTC+2 | | Report | Tekpetey 14'; Nedelev 56'; Rwan Cruz 72'; Rick 81' | Stadium: Stadion Hristo Botev; Referee: Stoyan Arsov (Sofia) |

| 22 November 2023 | Dunav Ruse (II) | 1−3 | Levski Sofia (I) | Ruse |
| 18:00 UTC+2 | Valchev 30' | Report | Ricardinho 26', 45+2' (pen.); Ronaldo 56' | Stadium: Gradski stadion Referee: Vladimir Valkov (Plovdiv) |

| 23 November 2023 | Yantra Gabrovo (II) | 1−4 | Slavia Sofia (I) | Gabrovo |
| 13:30 UTC+2 | Mihaylov 21' | Report | Ivanov 5'; Nikolov 34'; Aleksandrov 67'; Sorakov 87' | Stadium: Stadion Hristo Botev; Referee: Georgi Ginchev (Veliko Tarnovo) |

=== Round of 16 ===
The draw was conducted on 10 November 2023. The games were played between 18 November and 7 December 2023. In this stage the participants were the 16 winners from the previous round.

| 18 November 2023 | Lokomotiv Sofia (I) | 0−0 (a.e.t.) (1−4 p) | Spartak Varna (II) | Sofia |
| 14:00 UTC+2 | | Report | | Stadium: Stadion Lokomotiv; Referee: Georgi Ivanov (Sofia) |
| | Penalties |
| | Stanoev (penalty missed); Mechev (penalty missed); Mitkov (penalty scored) | | (penalty scored) Tsvetkov; (penalty scored) Mitev; (penalty scored) Zehirov; (penalty scored) Ahmedov |

| 18 November 2023 | Pirin Blagoevgrad (I) | 2−1 (a.e.t.) | Botev Vratsa (I) | Blagoevgrad |
| 14:30 UTC+2 | Souda 50'; Tasev 112' | Report | Genov 17' | Stadium: Stadion Hristo Botev; Referee: Kristiyan Kolev (Plovdiv) |

| 5 December 2023 | Arda Kardzhali (I) | 4−1 | Litex Lovech (II) | Kardzhali |
| 14:00 UTC+2 | Mitev 18'; Yordanov 23', 65', 71' | Report | Vasilev 61' | Stadium: Arena Arda; Referee: Georgi Ivanov (Sofia) |

| 5 December 2023 | Slavia Sofia (I) | 0–1 | CSKA Sofia (I) | Sofia |
| 17:30 UTC+2 | | Report | Phaëton 27' | Stadium: Stadion Aleksandar Shalamanov; Referee: Nikola Popov (Sofia) |

| 6 December 2023 | Hebar Pazardzhik (I) | 2−1 | Levski Sofia (I) | Pazardzhik |
| 14:30 UTC+2 | Bastunov 68' (pen.); Kabov 90+9' | Report | Welton 90+1' | Stadium: Stadion Georgi Benkovski; Referee: Vasimir El-Hatib (Sofia) |

| 6 December 2023 | Ludogorets Razgrad (I) | 4−0 | Lokomotiv Plovdiv (I) | Razgrad |
| 17:30 UTC+2 | Caio Vidal 11'; Rick 75'; Rwan Cruz 84'; Tissera 90+3' | Report | | Stadium: Huvepharma Arena; Referee: Georgi Ginchev (Veliko Tarnovo) |

| 7 December 2023 | CSKA 1948 Sofia (I) | 2−1 | Beroe Stara Zagora (I) | Bistritsa |
| 14:30 UTC+2 | Pedrinho 60'; Chochev 87' | Report | Godoy 53' | Stadium: Stadion Bistritsa; Referee: Georgi Kabakov (Plovdiv) |

| 7 December 2023 | Etar Veliko Tarnovo (I) | 2−4 | Botev Plovdiv (I) | Veliko Tarnovo |
| 17:30 UTC+2 | Knežević 86'; Dimitrov 90+1' | Report | Sekulić 64'; Eto'o 72'; Emmanuel 90'; Akere 90+4' | Stadium: Stadion Ivaylo; Referee: Volen Chinkov (Sofia) |

=== Quarter-finals ===
The draw was conducted on 15 December 2023. The games were played between 27 and 29 February 2024. In this stage the participants were the 8 winners from the previous round.

| 27 February 2024 | Botev Plovdiv (I) | 2−1 | Spartak Varna (II) | Plovdiv |
| 17:30 UTC+2 | Akere 22'; Popov 72' | Report | Ahmedov 87' | Stadium: Stadion Hristo Botev; Attendance: 3,746; Referee: Stoyan Arsov (Sofia) |

| 28 February 2024 | Hebar Pazardzhik (I) | 2−1 | Pirin Blagoevgrad (I) | Pazardzhik |
| 14:30 UTC+2 | Valchev 45+5' (pen.); Diamanka 90+4' | Report | Tasev 59' | Stadium: Stadion Georgi Benkovski; Attendance: 450; Referee: Krasen Georgiev (Varna) |

| 28 February 2024 | CSKA Sofia (I) | 1−0 | Arda Kardzhali (I) | Sofia |
| 17:30 UTC+2 | Youga 19' | Report | | Stadium: Natsionalen stadion Vasil Levski (Note: From the spring of 2024 CSKA plays their home games at Natsionalen stadion Vasil Levski, Sofia, instead of their regular stadium Stadion Balgarska Armia, Sofia, which is undergoing a major reconstruction.); Referee: Stanimir Trenchev (Sofia) |

| 29 February 2024 | Ludogorets Razgrad (I) | 3−1 | CSKA 1948 Sofia (I) | Razgrad |
| 17:30 UTC+2 | Nedelev 17', 46'; Rick 80' | Report | Pedrinho 58' | Stadium: Huvepharma Arena; Referee: Valentin Zhelezov (Burgas) |

=== Semi-finals ===
The draw was conducted on 29 February 2024. The first legs were played on 17 and 24 April, while the second legs were scheduled on 1 and 2 May 2024.

==== First legs ====
| 17 April 2024 | CSKA Sofia | 0−1 | Botev Plovdiv | Sofia |
| 19:00 UTC+3 | | Report | Emmanuel 46' | Stadium: Natsionalen stadion Vasil Levski; Referee: Dragomir Draganov (Varna) |

| 24 April 2024 | Ludogorets Razgrad | 4−0 | Hebar Pazardzhik | Razgrad |
| 18:45 UTC+3 | Rick 4', 21'; Almeida 55'; Delev 80' | Report | | Stadium: Huvepharma Arena; Attendance: 498; Referee: Vladimir Valkov (Plovdiv) |

==== Second legs ====
| 1 May 2024 | Botev Plovdiv | 2−0 (3−0 agg.) | CSKA Sofia | Plovdiv |
| 18:45 UTC+3 | Popov 4'; Mertens 82' | Report | | Stadium: Stadion Hristo Botev; Attendance: 16,233; Referee: Volen Chinkov (Sofia) |

| 2 May 2024 | Hebar Pazardzhik | 0−5 (0–9 agg.) | Ludogorets Razgrad | Pazardzhik |
| 18:45 UTC+3 | | Report | Chochev 5'; Vidal 22'; Gonçalves 44'; Tissera 75'; Sundberg 90' | Stadium: Stadion Georgi Benkovski; Referee: Georgi Ginchev (Veliko Tarnovo) |

=== Final ===
15 May 2024
19:00 UTC+3

| Ludogorets Razgrad | 2−3 | Botev Plovdiv |
|---|---|---|
| Duah 8'; Rwan Cruz 71' | Report | Conte 4'; Sekulić 45'; Emmanuel 58' |

Vasil Levski National Stadium, Sofia
Attendance: 11,334
Referee: Dragomir Draganov (Varna)
