= Babacar Dione =

Babacar Dione my refer to:

- Babacar Dione (footballer) (born 1997), Belgian footballer
- Babacar Dione (judoka) (born 1961), Senegalese judoka
