= Martin Sekulić (footballer) =

Croatian footballer

Personal information
- Date of birth: 4 January 1999 (age 27)
- Place of birth: Zagreb, Croatia
- Height: 1.90 m (6 ft 3 in)
- Positions: Second striker; forward

Team information
- Current team: Ural
- Number: 10

Youth career
- 2010–2017: NK HAŠK
- 2017–2018: Hajduk Split
- 2019–2020: NK Ravnice
- 2020: Kustošija

Senior career*
Years	Team	Apps	(Gls)
2018–2019	Hrvatski Dragovoljac	2	(0)
2020–2021	Osijek II	30	(9)
2020–2021	Osijek	1	(0)
2021	Hrvatski Dragovoljac	1	(0)
2021–2022	Rudeš	28	(13)
2022–2023	Botev Plovdiv II	3	(0)
2022–2024	Botev Plovdiv	58	(11)
2024–	Ural	54	(21)
- * Club domestic league appearances and goals as of 16 May 2026

Martin Sekulić (born 4 January 1999) is a Croatian professional footballer who plays as a forward for Russian First League club Ural.

== Career ==
Born in Zagreb, Croatia, Martin started his career in local NK HAŠK. On 9 July 2022 he moved to Bulgarian club Botev Plovdiv, after a strong season with Rudeš.

== Career statistics ==
As of 23 May 2026

Club	Season	League			Cup		Continental		Other		Total	
Club	Season	Division	Apps	Goals	Apps	Goals	Apps	Goals	Apps	Goals	Apps	Goals
Hrvatski Dragovoljac	2018–19	First Football League	2	0	1	0	—		—		3	0
Osijek II	2020–21	First Football League	30	9	—		—		—		30	9
Osijek	2020–21	Croatian Football League	1	0	0	0	—		—		1	0
Hrvatski Dragovoljac	2021–22	Croatian Football League	1	0	—		—		—		1	0
Rudeš	2021–22	First Football League	28	13	2	1	—		—		30	14
Botev Plovdiv II	2022–23	Second Professional Football League	3	0	—		—		—		3	0
Botev Plovdiv	2022–23	First Professional Football League	25	3	0	0	2 (Note: Appearances in UEFA Conference League)	0	—		27	3
Botev Plovdiv	2023–24	First Professional Football League	30	6	6	5	—		—		36	11
Botev Plovdiv	2024–25	First Professional Football League	3	2	—		6 (Note: Four appearances in UEFA Europa League, two appearances in UEFA Conference League)	0	—		9	2
Botev Plovdiv	Total		58	11	6	5	8	0	0	0	72	16
Ural	2024–25	Russian First League	23	14	2	0	—		2 (Note: Appearances in promotion play-offs)	2	27	16
Ural	2025–26	Russian First League	31	7	1	0	—		2	0	34	7
Ural	Total		54	21	3	0	0	0	4	2	61	23
Career total			177	54	12	6	8	0	4	2	201	62

== Honours ==
Botev Plovdiv

- Bulgarian Cup: 2023–24
