= Denis Davydov (footballer) =

Russian professional footballer

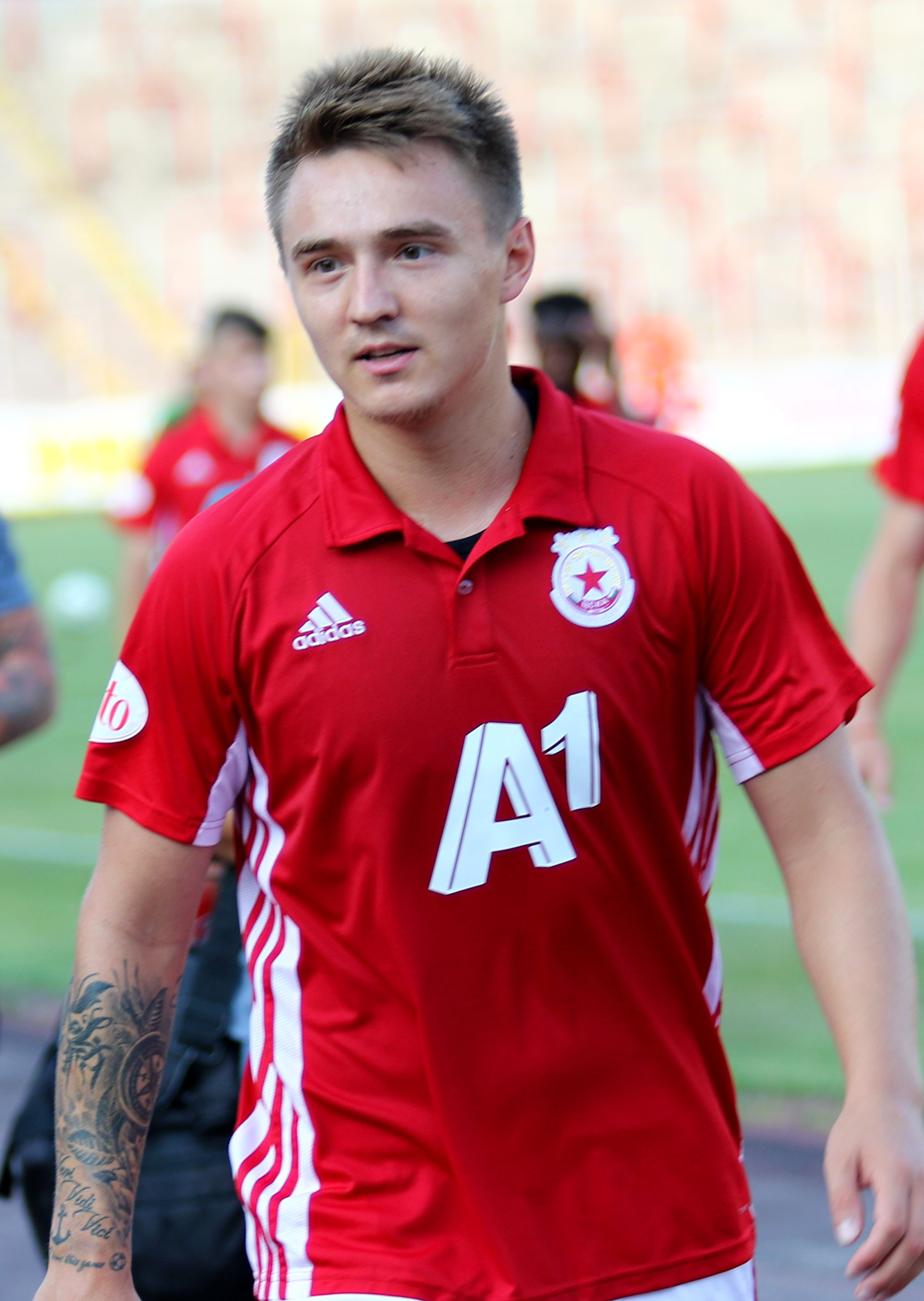
- Davydov in 2019

Personal information
- Full name: Denis Alekseyevich Davydov
- Date of birth: 22 March 1995 (age 31)
- Place of birth: Moscow, Russia
- Height: 1.75 m (5 ft 9 in)
- Positions: Winger; second striker

Youth career
- 2001–2010: FC Moscow
- 2010–2015: Spartak Moscow

Senior career*
| Years | Team | Apps | (Gls) |
| 2013–2019 | Spartak Moscow | 33 | (1) |
| 2013–2018 | → Spartak-2 Moscow | 90 | (33) |
| 2016 | → Mladá Boleslav (loan) | 0 | (0) |
| 2018 | → Spartaks Jūrmala (loan) | 12 | (2) |
| 2019 | Nizhny Novgorod | 7 | (1) |
| 2019−2020 | CSKA Sofia | 3 | (0) |
| 2020–2021 | Tom Tomsk | 17 | (2) |
| 2021–2022 | Znamya Truda | 21 | (9) |
| 2022–2023 | Khimki | 0 | (0) |
| 2022–2023 | Khimki-M | 6 | (0) |

International career
| 2011 | Russia U-16 | 9 | (2) |
| 2012 | Russia U-17 | 8 | (1) |
| 2013 | Russia U-18 | 8 | (11) |
| 2013–2014 | Russia U-19 | 12 | (10) |
| 2013–2015 | Russia U-21 | 13 | (4) |
| 2015 | Russia | 1 | (0) |
- * Club domestic league appearances and goals

Denis Alekseyevich Davydov (Russian: Денис Алексеевич Давыдов; born 22 March 1995) is a Russian former professional footballer who played as a winger or second striker.

== Club career ==
He made his debut in the Russian Premier League for FC Spartak Moscow on 28 September 2013 in a game against FC Zenit St. Petersburg.

On 19 February 2019, he was released from his contract by FC Spartak Moscow by mutual consent.

On 27 February 2019, he signed with FC Nizhny Novgorod.

On 28 May 2019, he joined Bulgarian club CSKA Sofia. After featuring only on rare occasions for the team, Davidov decided to cancel his contract with the "redmen" in the spring of 2020.

On 18 September 2020, he signed with Tom Tomsk.

On 14 July 2022, Davydov signed with Khimki.

On 7 February 2024, Davydov announced that he is putting his football career on pause.

=== Career statistics ===
As of 27 November 2022

| Club | Season | League | | | Cup | | Continental | | Other | | Total | |
| Club | Season | Division | Apps | Goals | Apps | Goals | Apps | Goals | Apps | Goals | Apps | Goals |
|---|---|---|---|---|---|---|---|---|---|---|---|---|
| Spartak Moscow | 2013–14 | RPL | 2 | 0 | 0 | 0 | 0 | 0 | – | | 2 | 0 |
| Spartak Moscow | 2014–15 | RPL | 19 | 0 | 1 | 0 | – | | – | | 20 | 0 |
| Spartak Moscow | 2015–16 | RPL | 8 | 1 | 1 | 0 | – | | – | | 9 | 1 |
| Mladá Boleslav | 2015–16 | Czech First League | 0 | 0 | 0 | 0 | – | | – | | 0 | 0 |
| Spartak Moscow | 2016–17 | RPL | 4 | 0 | 1 | 0 | 0 | 0 | – | | 5 | 0 |
| Spartak Moscow | 2017–18 | RPL | 0 | 0 | 1 | 0 | 0 | 0 | – | | 1 | 0 |
| Spartak Moscow | Total (2 spells) | | 33 | 1 | 4 | 0 | 0 | 0 | 0 | 0 | 37 | 1 |
| Spartak-2 Moscow | 2013–14 | Second League | 21 | 8 | – | | – | | – | | 21 | 8 |
| Spartak-2 Moscow | 2014–15 | Second League | 10 | 7 | – | | – | | – | | 10 | 7 |
| Spartak-2 Moscow | 2015–16 | First League | 9 | 3 | – | | – | | – | | 9 | 3 |
| Spartak-2 Moscow | 2016–17 | First League | 29 | 13 | – | | – | | – | | 29 | 13 |
| Spartak-2 Moscow | 2017–18 | First League | 21 | 2 | – | | – | | 5 (Note: Appearances in the FNL Cup) | 1 | 26 | 3 |
| Spartak-2 Moscow | Total | | 90 | 33 | 0 | 0 | 0 | 0 | 5 | 1 | 95 | 34 |
| Spartaks Jūrmala | 2018 | Latvian Higher League | 12 | 2 | 1 | 1 | 3 (Note: Two appearances in the UEFA Champions League, one appearance in the UEFA Europa League) | 0 | – | | 16 | 3 |
| Nizhny Novgorod | 2018–19 | First League | 7 | 1 | 0 | 0 | – | | – | | 7 | 1 |
| CSKA Sofia | 2019–20 | Bulgarian First League | 3 | 0 | 1 | 1 | 0 | 0 | – | | 4 | 1 |
| Tom Tomsk | 2020–21 | First League | 17 | 2 | – | | – | | – | | 17 | 2 |
| Znamya Truda | 2021–22 | Second League | 21 | 9 | – | | – | | – | | 21 | 9 |
| Khimki | 2022–23 | RPL | 0 | 0 | 1 | 0 | – | | – | | 1 | 0 |
| Khimki-M | 2022–23 | Second League | 6 | 0 | – | | – | | – | | 6 | 0 |
| Career total | | | 189 | 48 | 7 | 2 | 3 | 0 | 5 | 1 | 204 | 51 |

== International ==
Davydov made his debut for the Russia national football team on 31 March 2015 in a friendly game against Kazakhstan.
