= Plamen Galabov =

Bulgarian footballer

Plamen Galabov Пламен Гълъбов
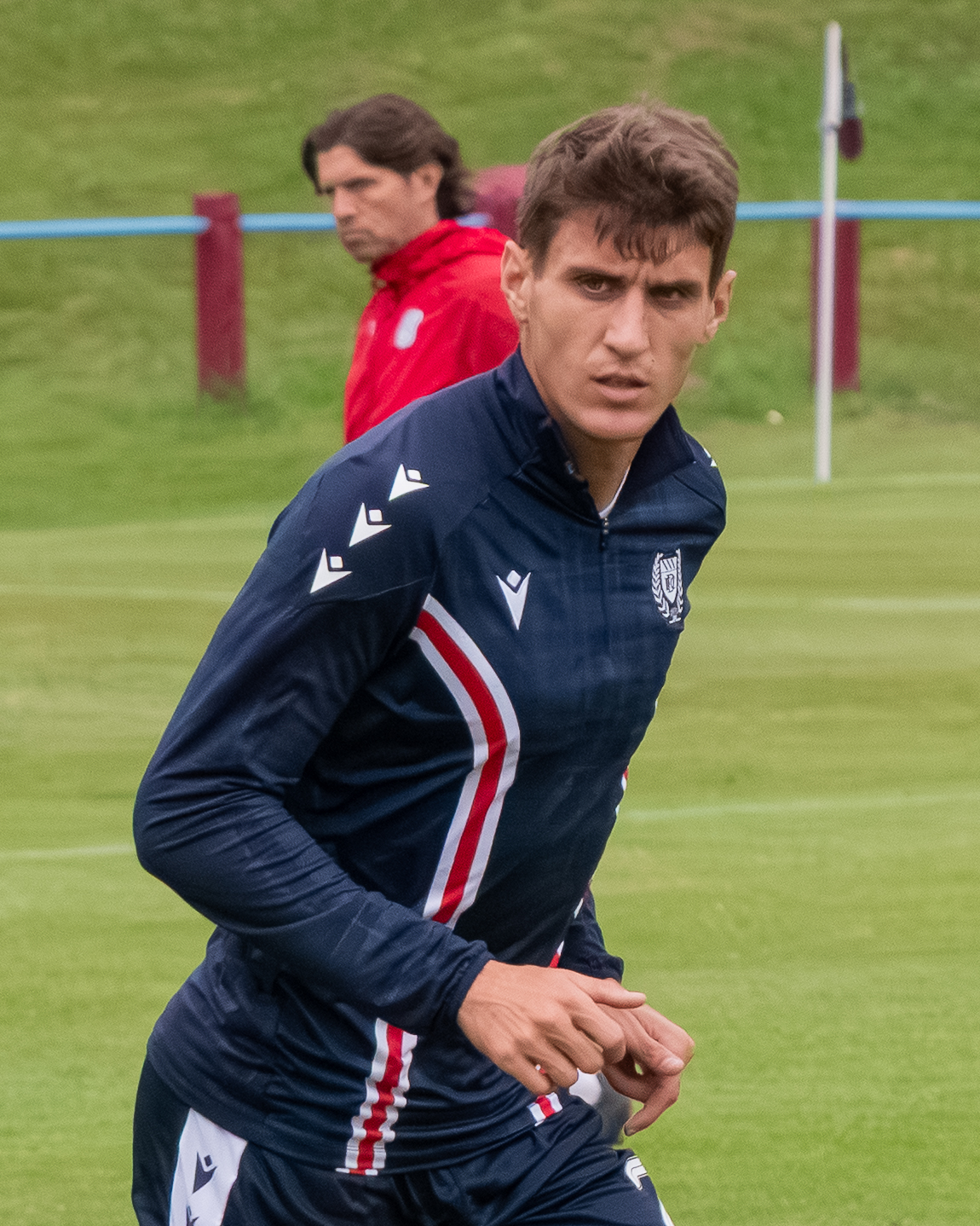
- Galabov warming up for Dundee in 2025

Personal information
- Full name: Plamen Yordanov Galabov
- Date of birth: 2 November 1995 (age 31)
- Place of birth: Shumen, Bulgaria
- Height: 1.88 m (6 ft 2 in)
- Positions: Centre-back; right-back

Youth career
- 2003–2007: FC Shumen
- 2007–2013: Litex Lovech

Senior career*
Years	Team	Apps	(Gls)
2013–2016	Litex Lovech	28	(2)
2016	Litex Lovech II	12	(1)
2016–2027	CSKA Sofia II	17	(1)
2016–2022	CSKA Sofia	46	(1)
2017–2018	→ Etar (loan)	18	(0)
2018–2019	→ Etar (loan)	24	(0)
2022–2024	Maccabi Netanya	60	(1)
2024	Beitar Jerusalem	12	(0)
2024–2025	Maccabi Petah Tikva	30	(0)
2025–2026	Dundee	0	(0)
2026	Kyzylzhar	9	(0)

International career^{‡}
2011–2012	Bulgaria U17	7	(0)
2013–2015	Bulgaria U19	9	(1)
2014–2016	Bulgaria U21	13	(0)
2020–	Bulgaria	5	(0)
- * Club domestic league appearances and goals as of 24 August 2026 ‡ National team caps and goals as of 27 March 2023

Plamen Yordanov Galabov (Bulgarian: Пламен Йорданов Гълъбов; born 2 November 1995) is a Bulgarian professional footballer who plays as a defender.

== Club career ==
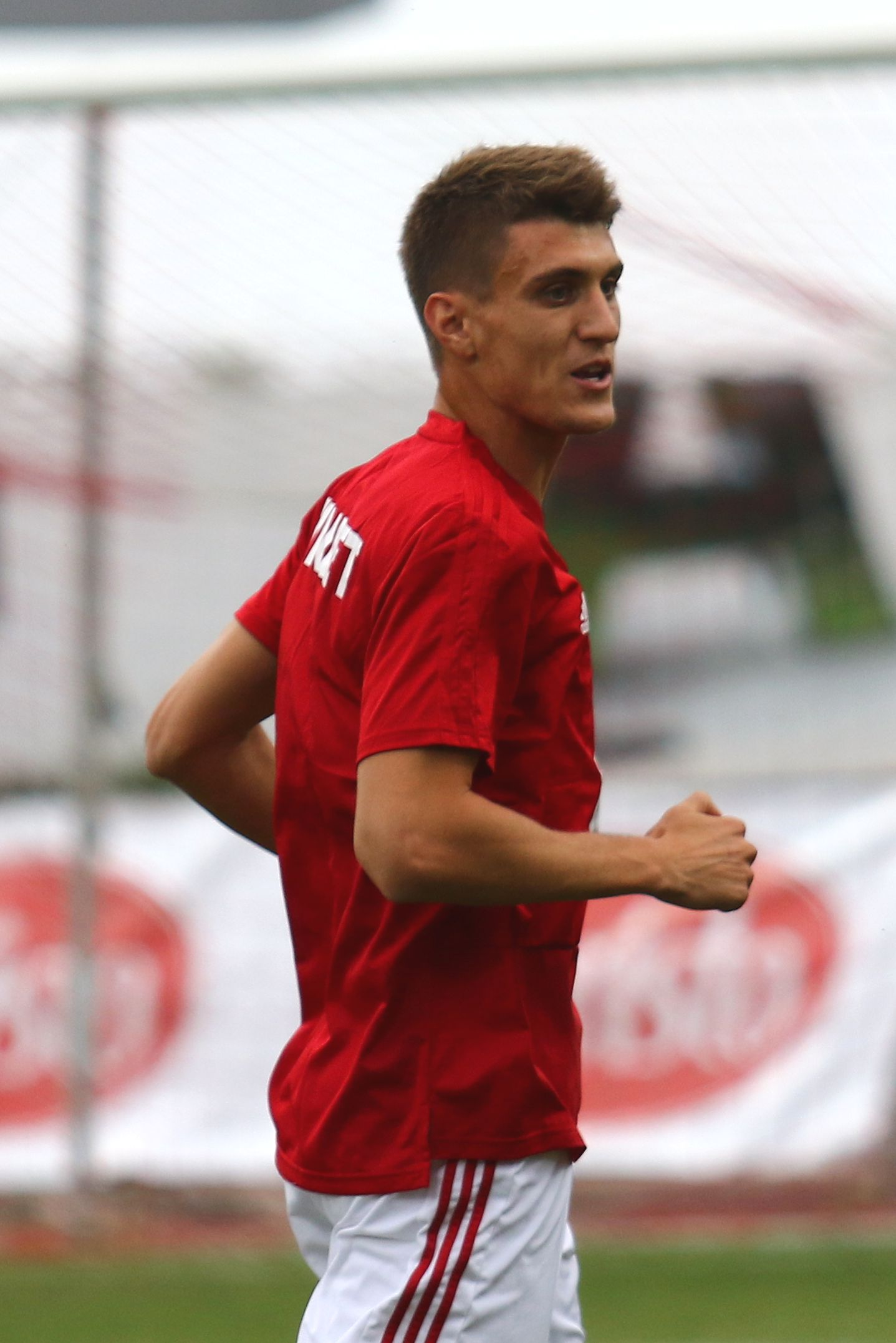
Galabov training with CSKA Sofia

Galabov made his competitive debut on 12 December 2012 in a Bulgarian Cup game against Spartak Varna, coming on as a substitute in the 56th minute. Litex won the game by a score of 7–1. A year later, on 14 December 2013, he made his A PFG debut in a 5–2 away win over Lokomotiv Plovdiv, playing the full 90 minutes, though he was sent off for a second yellow card in the closing moments of the match.

On 6 September 2017, Galabov was loaned to Etar Veliko Tarnovo until the end of the year. A year later he was again loaned out to Etar until the end of 2018.

On 27 June 2025, Galabov joined Scottish Premiership club Dundee on a two-year deal. On 18 January 2026, after struggling to adjust to football and life in Scotland, Galabov left the club by mutual consent, having only made 2 appearances.

On 29 January 2026, Galabov joined Kazakhstan Premier League club FC Kyzylzhar on a year-long deal.

== International career ==
Galabov was named in Bulgaria's 2016 Kirin Cup squad but was later withdrawn through injury. but got an injury before the cup. He earned his first cap on 3 September 2020, replacing then CSKA Sofia teammate Petar Zanev for the last 11 minutes of a 1–1 home draw with Republic of Ireland in a UEFA Nations League match.

== Career statistics ==
=== Club ===
As of 28 May 2026

Appearances and goals by club, season and competition
Club	Season	League			National cup		League cup		Europe		Other		Total	
Club	Season	Division	Apps	Goals	Apps	Goals	Apps	Goals	Apps	Goals	Apps	Goals	Apps	Goals
Litex Lovech	2012–13	A Group	0	0	1	0	–		–		–		1	0
Litex Lovech	2013–14	A Group	1	0	0	0	–		–		–		1	0
Litex Lovech	2014–15	A Group	17	2	1	0	–		0	0	–		18	2
Litex Lovech	2015–16	A Group	10	0	3	0	–		0	0	–		13	0
Litex Lovech II	2015–16	B Group	12	1	–		–		–		–		12	1
CSKA Sofia II	2016–17	Bulgarian Second League	17	1	–		–		–		–		17	1
CSKA Sofia	2016–17	Bulgarian First League	2	0	0	0	–		–		–		2	0
CSKA Sofia	2017–18	Bulgarian First League	1	0	0	0	–		–		–		1	0
CSKA Sofia	2018–19	Bulgarian First League	0	0	0	0	–		1	0	–		1	0
CSKA Sofia	2019–20	Bulgarian First League	17	1	3	0	–		2	0	–		22	1
CSKA Sofia	2020–21	Bulgarian First League	19	0	2	0	–		5	0	–		26	0
CSKA Sofia	2021–22	Bulgarian First League	7	0	1	0	–		5	0	1	0	14	0
CSKA Sofia	Total		46	1	6	0	0	0	13	0	1	0	66	1
Etar Veliko Tarnovo (loan)	2017–18	Bulgarian First League	18	0	1	0	–		–		–		19	0
Etar Veliko Tarnovo (loan)	2018–19	Bulgarian First League	24	0	3	0	–		–		–		27	0
Etar Veliko Tarnovo (loan)	Total		42	0	4	0	0	0	0	0	0	0	46	0
Maccabi Netanya	2021–22	Israeli Premier League	14	0	0	0	–		–		–		14	0
Maccabi Netanya	2022–23	Israeli Premier League	31	0	4	0	3	0	–		–		38	0
Maccabi Netanya	2023–24	Israeli Premier League	15	1	1	0	4	0	–		–		20	1
Maccabi Netanya	Total		60	1	5	0	7	0	0	0	0	0	72	1
Beitar Jerusalem	2023–24	Israeli Premier League	12	0	0	0	–		–		–		12	0
Maccabi Petah Tikva	2024–25	Israeli Premier League	30	0	2	0	–		4 (Note: 2 appearances in UEFA Europa League, 2 appearances in UEFA Conference League)	0	1 (Note: Appearance in Israel Super Cup)	0	37	0
Dundee	2025–26	Scottish Premiership	0	0	0	0	2	0	–		0	0	2	0
Kyzylzhar	2026	Kazakhstan Premier League	9	0	2	1	0	0	–		0	0	11	1
Career total			256	6	24	1	9	0	17	0	2	0	308	7

=== International ===
As of match played 27 March 2023

Appearances and goals by national team and year
National team	Year	Apps	Goals
Bulgaria	2020	1	0
Bulgaria	2022	3	0
Bulgaria	2023	1	0
Total		5	0

== Honours ==
CSKA Sofia

- Bulgarian Cup: 2020–21

Maccabi Netanya

- Toto Cup: 2022-23
