= Umeh Emmanuel =

Nigerian footballer (born 2004)

Personal information
- Full name: Umeh Umeh Emmanuel
- Date of birth: 31 August 2004 (age 22)
- Place of birth: Nigeria
- Height: 1.75 m (5 ft 9 in)
- Position: Forward

Team information
- Current team: FC Zürich
- Number: 11

Youth career
- Right2win Football Academy
- –2022: Vista Gelendzhik

Senior career*
Years	Team	Apps	(Gls)
2022	Botev Plovdiv II	3	(3)
2022–2024	Botev Plovdiv	40	(8)
2024–	FC Zürich	68	(7)

International career^{‡}
2022–	Nigeria U20	5	(0)
- * Club domestic league appearances and goals as of 28 September 2026 ‡ National team caps and goals as of 10 June 2023

Umeh Umeh Emmanuel (born 31 August 2004) is a Nigerian professional footballer who plays as a forward for Swiss side FC Zürich.

== Club career ==
Emmanuel played for the Right2win Football Academy in Nigeria before moving to Russian side Vista Gelendzhik.

In 2022, he joined Botev Plovdiv. On 15 October 2022, he made his professional debut in Botev Plovdiv 3–1 victory against Pirin. Emmanuel scored his first professional goal on 4 March 2023 against Cherno More and brought a 2–1 win for his club.

On the 8th of July, Emmanuel signed a five-year contract with Swiss team FC Zürich.

== International career ==
Emmanuel represented Nigeria's under-20 team at the 2023 FIFA U-20 World Cup. He appeared all five matches as Nigeria was knocked-out by South Korea in the quarter-finals. Emmanuel didn't score any goals during the tournament but provided two assists.

== Personal life ==
Emmanuel wears the number-11 shirt because it was the one worn by his favourite player, Didier Drogba.

== Honours ==
Botev Plovdiv

- Bulgarian Cup: 2023–24
