= 2021–22 NK Hrvatski Dragovoljac season =

Hrvatski Dragovoljac
2021–22 season
- Chairman: Marinko Perić
- Manager: Miroslav Kuljanac
- Stadium: Stadion Kranjčevićeva
- Prva HNL: 10th
- Croatian Cup: Pre-season
- Top goalscorer: League: Mario Veljača (2); All: Mario Veljača (2)
Home colours	Away colours
- All statistics correct as of 8 August 2021.

The 2021–22 season is the 47th season in the existence of NK Hrvatski Dragovoljac and the club's first season back in the top flight of Croatian football since 2014. In addition to the domestic league, Hrvatski Dragovoljac will participate in this season's edition of the Croatian Cup.

== Players ==
=== First-team squad ===
As of 6 August 2021

Note: Flags indicate national team as defined under FIFA eligibility rules; some limited exceptions apply. Players may hold more than one non-FIFA nationality.

No.	Pos.	Nation	Player
1	GK	CRO	Mario Marić
2	DF	CRO	Ricardo Bagadur
3	DF	KOS	Nue Nreca
4	FW	MNE	Dženan Mučić
5	MF	CRO	Marko Bašić
6	DF	CRO	Stipe Vulikić
7	FW	CRO	Valentino Majstorović
8	MF	CRO	Dino Skorup (on loan from Hajduk Split)
9	FW	CRO	Karlo Perić
10	FW	CRO	Vinko Petković
11	FW	CRO	Fran Beloša Fijan
13	DF	CRO	Tomislav Valentić
14	FW	CRO	Luka Viduka (on loan from Lokomotiva)
16	MF	CRO	Domagoj Babin
17	FW	CRO	Filip Jazvić
18	FW	CRO	Martin Sekulić
19	DF	CRO	Tin Hrvoj (on loan from Dinamo Zagreb)

No.	Pos.	Nation	Player
20	FW	CRO	Bruno Karoglan
21	FW	COL	Danovis Martínez
22	MF	CRO	Ivan Roca
23	MF	CRO	Tonio Teklić (on loan from Hajduk Split)
24	MF	CRO	Jakov Bašić
25	MF	CRO	Mario Burić
27	DF	SLO	Dominik Ivkič
28	FW	CRO	Mario Veljača
31	MF	CRO	Benedik Mioč
32	MF	CRO	Luka Pasariček
97	GK	CRO	Zvonimir Šubarić (captain)
—	MF	CAN	Ivan Mamić
—	MF	ALB	Mark Bushaj (on loan from Hajduk Split)
—	FW	COL	Jhon Fredy Miranda
—	FW	RUS	Kirill Kosarev (on loan from Rubin Kazan)
—	FW	SUI	Leo Perić
—	FW	CRO	Tomislav Turčin

=== Other players under contract ===
Note: Flags indicate national team as defined under FIFA eligibility rules; some limited exceptions apply. Players may hold more than one non-FIFA nationality.

No.	Pos.	Nation	Player
—	DF	CRO	Luka Smoljo
—	MF	CRO	Leon-Habib Ernst
—	MF	BFA	Patrice Zoungrana

No.	Pos.	Nation	Player
—	FW	CRO	Ivan Skansi
—	FW	CRO	Ivan Stjepanović
—	FW	GHA	Seth Amoateng

== Pre-season and friendlies ==
Win Draw Loss Fixtures

== Competitions ==
=== Overall record ===
Competition	First match	Last match	Starting round	Record							
Competition	First match	Last match	Starting round	Pld	W	D	L	GF	GA	GD	Win %
Prva HNL	18 July 2021	May 2022	Matchday 1	4	0	0	4	4	12	−8	0.00
Croatian Cup	TBD			0	0	0	0	0	0	+0	—
Total				4	0	0	4	4	12	−8	0.00

Last updated: 8 August 2021
Source: Soccerway

=== Prva HNL ===
==== League table ====
Pos	Team	Pld	W	D	L	GF	GA	GD	Pts	Qualification or relegation
6	Gorica	36	12	9	15	43	50	−7	45	
7	Slaven Belupo	36	9	9	18	35	54	−19	36	
8	Šibenik	36	9	5	22	46	75	−29	32	
9	Istra 1961	36	7	10	19	42	67	−25	31	
10	Hrvatski Dragovoljac (R)	36	4	7	25	31	75	−44	19	Relegation to First Football League

Source: PrvaHNL.hr
Rules for classification: 1) Points; 2) Head-to-head points; 3) Head-to-head goal difference; 4) Head-to-head goals scored (at home if two teams tied); 5) Goal difference; 6) Goals scored; 7) Play-off
(Note: Criteria 2-4 and 7 is only used if deciding champion, teams to international competition or teams for relegation and in that case criteria 6 will not be used).
(R) Relegated

==== Results summary ====
Overall								Home						Away					
Pld	W	D	L	GF	GA	GD	Pts	W	D	L	GF	GA	GD	W	D	L	GF	GA	GD
4	0	0	4	4	12	−8	0	0	0	2	1	6	−5	0	0	2	3	6	−3

Last updated: 8 August 2021.
Source: Prva HNL

==== Results by round ====
Round	1	2	3	4	5
Ground	A	H	A	H	A
Result	L	L	L	L	
Position	9	10			

Updated to match(es) played on 23 July 2021. Source: Prva HNL
A = Away; H = Home; W = Win; D = Draw; L = Loss

==== Matches ====
The league fixtures were announced on 8 June 2021.

18 July 2021 1	Istra 1961	3–1	Hrvatski Dragovoljac	Pula
18:55 CEST (UTC+2)	Bandé 10', 17'; Matić 45+3'; Mlinar (yellow card) 49'	Report	Sekulić (yellow card) 29'; Bašić (yellow card) 35'; Jazvić (yellow card) 45+2'; Roca (yellow card) 77'; Veljača 90+3'	Stadium: Stadion Aldo Drosina; Attendance: 713; Referee: Mario Zebec

23 July 2021 2	Hrvatski Dragovoljac	0–4	Dinamo Zagreb	Zagreb
20:00 CEST (UTC+2)	Teklić (yellow card) 34'	Report	Majer 19', 53'; Šutalo 36'; Gavranović 48'	Stadium: Stadion Kranjčevićeva; Attendance: 328; Referee: Ante Čuljak

30 July 2021 3	Lokomotiva	v	Hrvatski Dragovoljac	Zagreb
20:00 CEST (UTC+2)				Stadium: Stadion Kranjčevićeva
