= Martin Smolenski =

Bulgarian footballer

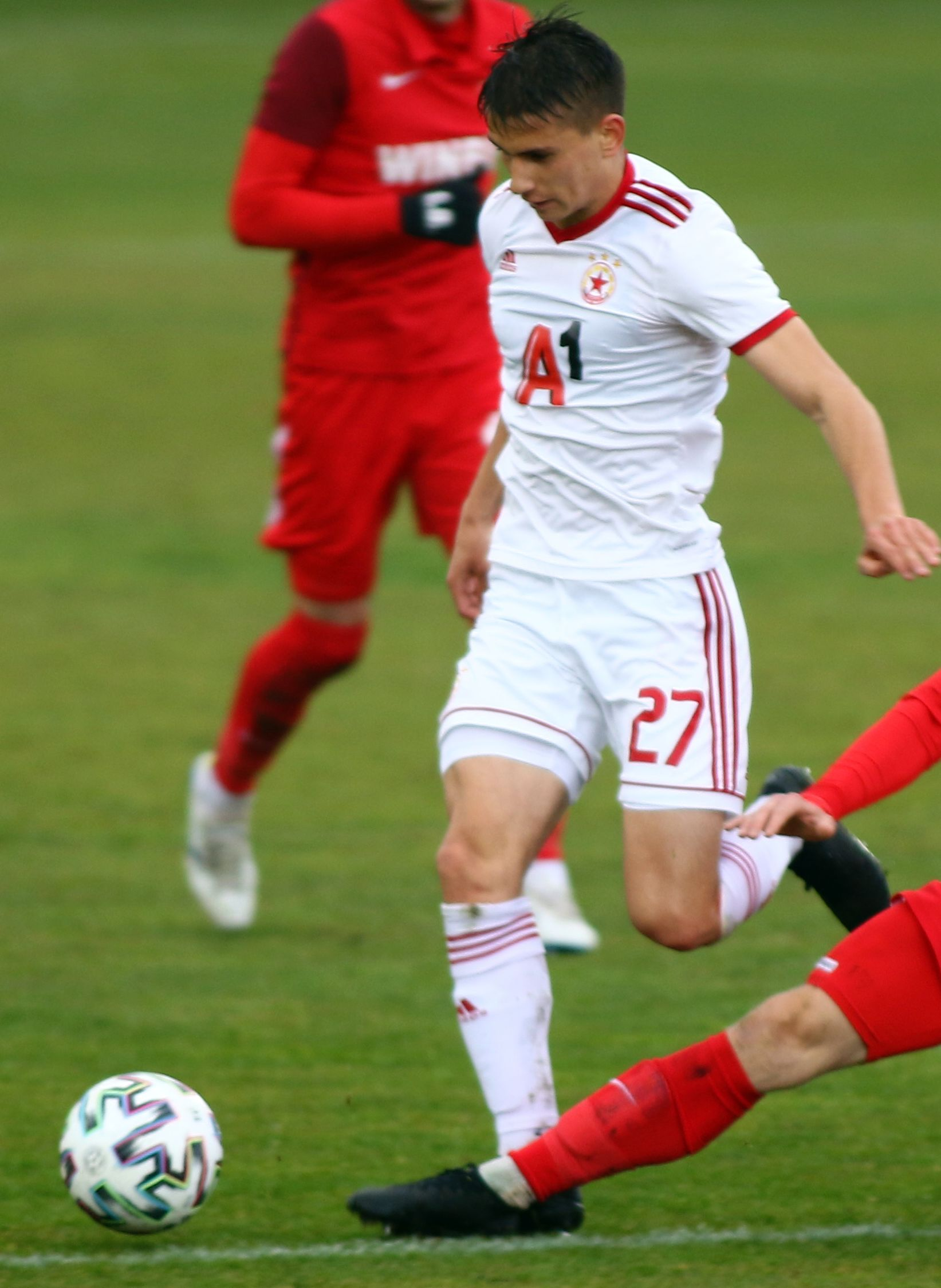

Personal information
- Full name: Martin Ognyanov Smolenski
- Date of birth: 8 March 2003 (age 23)
- Place of birth: Sofia, Bulgaria
- Height: 1.80 m (5 ft 11 in)
- Position: Winger

Team information
- Current team: Botev Vratsa
- Number: 24

Youth career
- 2009–2019: CSKA Sofia

Senior career*
Years	Team	Apps	(Gls)
2019–2023	CSKA Sofia	13	(0)
2020	→ Litex Lovech (loan)	1	(0)
2021–2022	→ Minyor Pernik (loan)	16	(1)
2022–2023	→ Pirin Blagoevgrad (loan)	30	(2)
2023–	Botev Vratsa	98	(10)

International career^{‡}
2018–2020	Bulgaria U17	12	(10)
2021–	Bulgaria U19	1	(0)
2022–	Bulgaria U21	2	(0)
- * Club domestic league appearances and goals as of 10:38, 14 November 2026 (UTC) ‡ National team caps and goals as of 09:31, 14 November 2022 (UTC)

Martin Smolenski (Bulgarian: Мартин Смоленски; born 8 March 2003) is a Bulgarian footballer who plays as a midfielder for Botev Vratsa.

== Career ==
Smolenski joined CSKA Sofia as an 7-year-old and progressed through the club's academy system. He made his senior debut on 9 March 2019, a day after his 16th birthday, in a 3–1 league win over Etar at Ivaylo Stadium, replacing Jorginho for the final 2 minutes. In July 2022 he was loaned out to Pirin Blagoevgrad.

== Career statistics ==
=== Club ===
As of 7 November 2026

Club	Season	Division	League		Cup		Europe		Total	
Club	Season	Division	Apps	Goals	Apps	Goals	Apps	Goals	Apps	Goals
CSKA Sofia	First League	2018–19	2	0	0	0	0	0	2	0
CSKA Sofia	First League	2019–20	1	0	0	0	0	0	1	0
CSKA Sofia	First League	2020–21	7	0	3	0	0	0	10	0
CSKA Sofia	Total		10	0	3	0	0	0	13	0
Litex Lovech (loan)	Second League	2019–20	1	0	0	0	–		1	0
Minyor Pernik (loan)	Second League	2021–22	16	1	0	0	–		16	1
Pirin Blagoevgrad (loan)	First League	2022–23	30	2	0	0	–		30	2
Botev Vratsa	First League	2023–24	25	3	2	0	–		27	3
Botev Vratsa	First League	2024–25	29	3	3	2	–		32	5
Botev Vratsa	First League	2025–26	30	2	3	2	–		33	4
Botev Vratsa	First League	2026–27	14	2	1	0	–		15	2
Botev Vratsa	Total		98	10	9	4	0	0	107	14
Career Total			155	13	12	4	0	0	167	17

== Honours ==
CSKA Sofia

- Bulgarian Cup: 2020–21
