= Daniel Gadzhev =

Bulgarian footballer

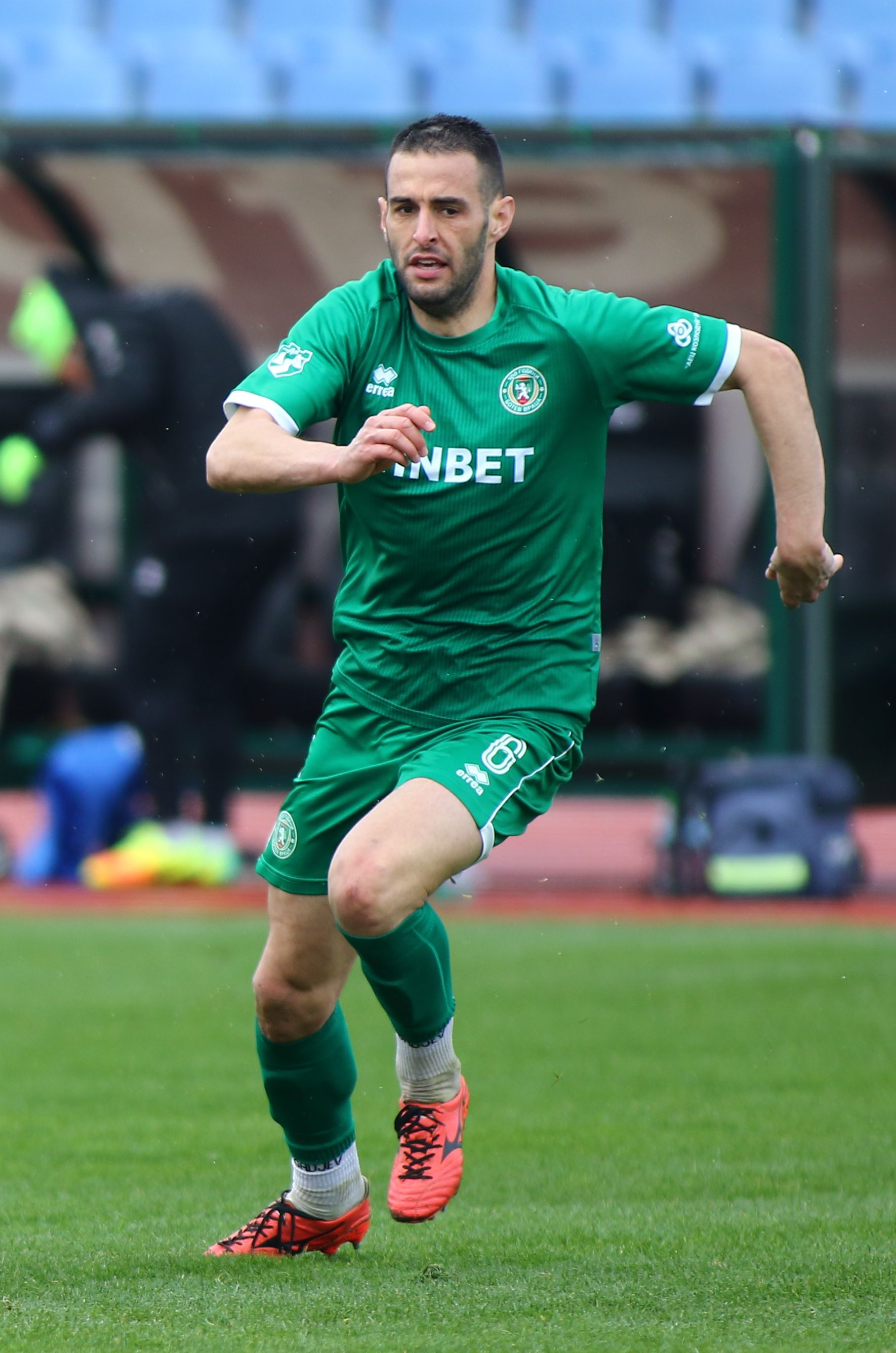

Personal information
- Full name: Daniel Hristov Gadzhev
- Date of birth: 21 June 1985 (age 41)
- Place of birth: Ihtiman, Bulgaria
- Height: 1.85 m (6 ft 1 in)
- Position: Central midfielder

Team information
- Current team: Yantra Gabrovo
- Number: 24

Senior career*
Years	Team	Apps	(Gls)
2002–2005	Botev Ihtiman		
2005	Balkan Botevgrad	8	(0)
2006–2007	Belasitsa Petrich	13	(1)
2008–2012	Montana	100	(1)
2012–2015	Lokomotiv Sofia	26	(0)
2016	Neftochimic Burgas	11	(0)
2017	Montana	8	(0)
2017–2021	Botev Vratsa	80	(0)
2021–	Yantra Gabrovo	65	(1)
- * Club domestic league appearances and goals as of 15 June 2024

Daniel Hristov Gadzhev (Bulgarian: Даниел Христов Гаджев; born 21 June 1985) is a Bulgarian professional footballer who plays as a midfielder for Bulgarian Second League club Yantra Gabrovo.

== Career ==
Gadzhev was out of contract with Belasitsa Petrich when he was signed by Montana on 5 February 2008.

After joining Montana, he became the club captain in August 2009. On 19 March 2012, Gadzhev was sent off against CSKA Sofia in a 2–0 defeat, marking his fourth match during 2011–12 season in which he had been shown a red card. On 25 March he was sent off for fifth time during campaign, in a game against Botev Vratsa. On 23 May 2012, Gadzhev made his 100th league appearance for Montana in a 2–4 home defeat against Chernomorets Burgas.

During the summer of 2012, Gadzhev was transferred to Lokomotiv Sofia.

In January 2017 Gadzhev returned to Montana, signing a 6-month contract. He left the club in June when his contract expired.

In July 2017, Gadzhev joined Botev Vratsa.

== Career statistics ==
As of 1 July 2012

Club	Season	League		Cup		Europe		Total	
Club	Season	Apps	Goals	Apps	Goals	Apps	Goals	Apps	Goals
Balkan Botevgrad	2005–06	8	0	1	0	—		9	0
Total		8	0	1	0	0	0	9	0
Belasitsa Petrich	2005–06	2	0	0	0	—		2	0
Belasitsa Petrich	2006–07	8	1	0	0	—		8	1
Belasitsa Petrich	2007–08	3	0	0	0	—		3	0
Total		13	1	0	0	0	0	13	1
Montana	2007–08	11	1	0	0	—		11	1
Montana	2008–09	26	0	3	0	—		29	0
Montana	2009–10	19	0	1	0	—		20	0
Montana	2010–11	21	0	1	0	—		22	0
Montana	2011–12	23	0	0	0	—		23	0
Total		100	1	5	0	0	0	105	1
Career total		121	2	6	0	0	0	127	2
