= Jean-Pierre Da Sylva =

French footballer (born 1997)

Personal information
- Date of birth: 3 January 1997 (age 29)
- Place of birth: France
- Height: 1.80 m (5 ft 11 in)
- Position: Left winger

Team information
- Current team: Haka
- Number: 7

Senior career*
| Years | Team | Apps | (Gls) |
| 2017 | Rouen | 1 | (0) |
| 2021–2022 | Neftochimic | 5 | (0) |
| 2022 | Septemvri Simitli | 14 | (0) |
| 2022–2024 | Botev Vratsa | 47 | (2) |
| 2024 | Septemvri Sofia | 15 | (1) |
| 2025– | Haka | 25 | (5) |
- * Club domestic league appearances and goals as of 19 November 2025

Jean-Pierre Da Sylva (born 3 January 1997) is a French professional footballer who plays as a left winger for Veikkausliiga club Haka.

== Club career ==
After playing in France for Rouen and in Bulgaria for Neftochimic Burgas, Septemvri Simitli, Botev Vratsa and Septemvri Sofia, Da Sylva moved to Finland in January 2025 and signed with Veikkausliiga club Haka for the 2025 season.

== Personal life ==
Born in France, Da Sylva is of Senegalese descent.

== Career statistics ==
As of 19 June 2025

Appearances and goals by club, season and competition
| Club | Season | League | | | National cup (Note: Includes Bulgarian Cup and Suomen Cup) | | League cup (Note: Includes Finnish League Cup) | | Total | |
| Club | Season | Division | Apps | Goals | Apps | Goals | Apps | Goals | Apps | Goals |
|---|---|---|---|---|---|---|---|---|---|---|
| Rouen | 2017–18 | National 3 | 1 | 0 | 0 | 0 | – | | 1 | 0 |
| Neftochimic Burgas | 2021–22 | Bulgarian Second League | 5 | 0 | – | | – | | 5 | 0 |
| Septemvri Simitli | 2021–22 | Bulgarian Second League | 14 | 0 | 0 | 0 | – | | 14 | 0 |
| Botev Vratsa | 2022–23 | Bulgarian First League | 28 | 1 | 1 | 0 | – | | 21 | 2 |
| Botev Vratsa | 2023–24 | Bulgarian First League | 19 | 1 | 2 | 1 | – | | 21 | 2 |
| Botev Vratsa | Total | | 47 | 2 | 3 | 1 | 0 | 0 | 50 | 3 |
| Septemvri Sofia | 2023–24 | Bulgarian Second League | 8 | 1 | – | | – | | 8 | 1 |
| Septemvri Sofia | 2024–25 | Bulgarian First League | 7 | 0 | 1 | 0 | – | | 8 | 0 |
| Septemvri Sofia | Total | | 15 | 1 | 1 | 0 | 0 | 0 | 16 | 1 |
| Haka | 2025 | Veikkausliiga | 11 | 2 | 3 | 0 | 4 | 0 | 18 | 2 |
| Career total | | | 93 | 4 | 7 | 1 | 4 | 0 | 104 | 6 |
