= Ahmed Ahmedov =

Bulgarian footballer (born 1995)

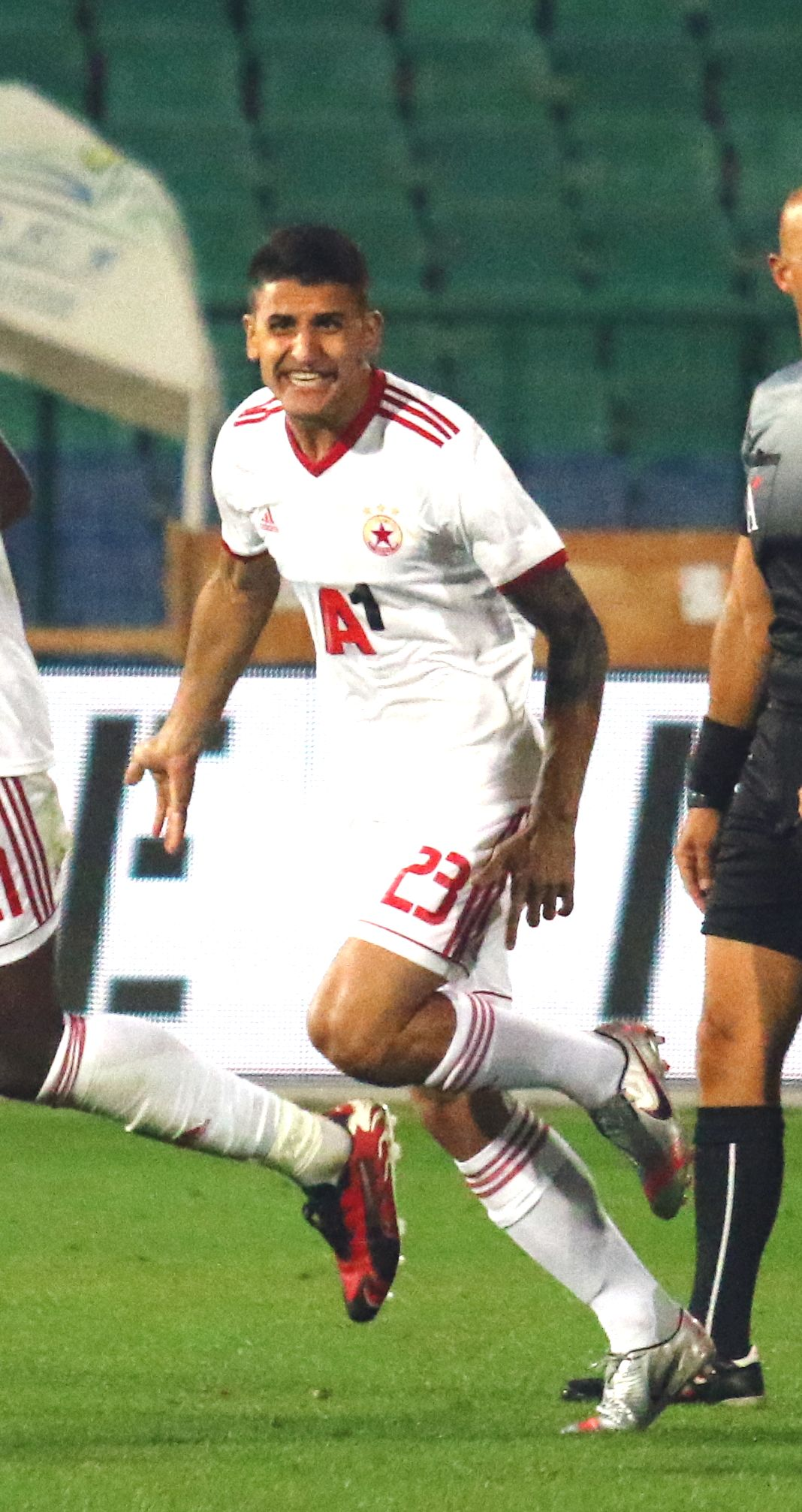

Personal information
- Full name: Ahmed Yalmazov Ahmedov
- Date of birth: 4 March 1995 (age 31)
- Place of birth: Planinitsa, Bulgaria
- Height: 1.84 m (6 ft 0 in)
- Position: Striker

Team information
- Current team: Spartak Varna
- Number: 70

Youth career
- 2007–2014: Chernomorets Burgas

Senior career*
Years	Team	Apps	(Gls)
2013–2014	Chernomorets Burgas	0	(0)
2014–2015	PFC Burgas	18	(2)
2015–2018	Pomorie	85	(25)
2018–2019	Dunav Ruse	53	(14)
2020–2022	CSKA Sofia	23	(1)
2021	→ Neftçi Baku (loan)	9	(1)
2022–2023	Slavia Sofia	32	(4)
2023–2024	Spartak Varna	52	(37)
2025–2026	Shimizu S-Pulse	9	(0)
2026–	Spartak Varna	2	(1)

International career^{‡}
2024–	Bulgaria	4	(0)
- * Club domestic league appearances and goals as of 20:51, 10 August 2026 (UTC) ‡ National team caps and goals as of 23:13, 18 November 2024 (UTC)

Ahmed Yalmazov Ahmedov (Bulgarian: Ахмед Йълмъзов Ахмедов; born 4 March 1995) is a Bulgarian professional footballer who plays as a striker for Spartak Varna.

== Club career ==
=== Dunav Ruse ===
On 18 June 2018 Ahmedov signed a contract with the Bulgarian First League team Dunav Ruse, after spending 3 seasons in OFC Pomorie. He made his professional debut for the team in the first league match of the season against Vitosha Bistritsa on 20 July 2018, scoring the only goal for Dunav.

=== Slavia Sofia ===
In June 2022 Ahmedov joined Slavia Sofia.

== International career ==
Born in Bulgaria, Ahmedov is of Turkish descent. In August 2024, he received his first call-up to the national team, being selected for the September UEFA Nations League matches against Belarus and Northern Ireland. He debuted on 5 September 2024 against Belarus at the ZTE Arena in Hungary. He substituted Aleksandar Kolev in the 83rd minute of a 0–0 draw.

== Career statistics ==
=== Club ===
As of match played 3 May 2025

Appearances and goals by club, season and competition
Club	Season	League			National cup (Note: Includes Bulgarian Cup, Azerbaijan Cup)		Europe		Other		Total	
Club	Season	Division	Apps	Goals	Apps	Goals	Apps	Goals	Apps	Goals	Apps	Goals
Chernomorets Burgas	2013–14	B Group	0	0	2	0	—		—		2	0
PFC Burgas	2014–15	B Group	18	2	1	0	—		—		19	2
OFC Pomorie	2015–16	B Group	29	7	0	0	–		1 (Note: Appearance in Bulgarian B Group promotion play-offs)	0	30	7
OFC Pomorie	2016–17	Second League	30	10	1	0	–		–		31	10
OFC Pomorie	2017–18	Second League	26	8	1	1	–		–		27	9
OFC Pomorie	Total		85	25	2	1	0	0	1	0	88	26
Dunav Ruse	2018–19	First League	35	8	2	0	—		—		37	8
Dunav Ruse	2019–20	First League	18	6	1	0	—		—		19	6
Dunav Ruse	Total		53	14	3	0	0	0	0	0	56	14
CSKA Sofia	2019–20	First League	6	0	3	1	—		—		9	1
CSKA Sofia	2020–21	First League	11	1	1	1	7 (Note: Appearances in UEFA Europa League)	2	—		19	4
CSKA Sofia	2021–22	First League	6	0	2	1	6 (Note: Appearances in UEFA Europa Conference League)	0	0	0	14	1
CSKA Sofia	Total		23	1	6	3	13	2	0	0	42	6
Neftçi Baku (loan)	2020–21	Azerbaijan Premier League	9	1	0	0	—		—		9	1
Slavia Sofia	2022–23	First League	32	4	3	1	—		—		35	5
Spartak Varna	2023–24	Second League	33	21	3	1	—		—		36	22
Spartak Varna	2024–25	First League	19	16	2	2	—		—		21	18
Spartak Varna	Total		51	37	5	3	0	0	0	0	57	40
Shimizu S-Pulse	2025	J1 League	8	0	2	1	—		—		10	1
Career total			280	83	24	9	13	2	1	0	318	95

=== International ===
As of match played 18 November 2024

Appearances and goals by national team and year
National team	Year	Apps	Goals
Bulgaria	2024	4	0
Total		4	0

== Honours ==
Neftchi Baku

- Azerbaijan Premier League: 2020–21

Spartak Varna

- Bulgarian Second League: 2023–24
