= Babacar Dione (footballer) =

Belgian footballer

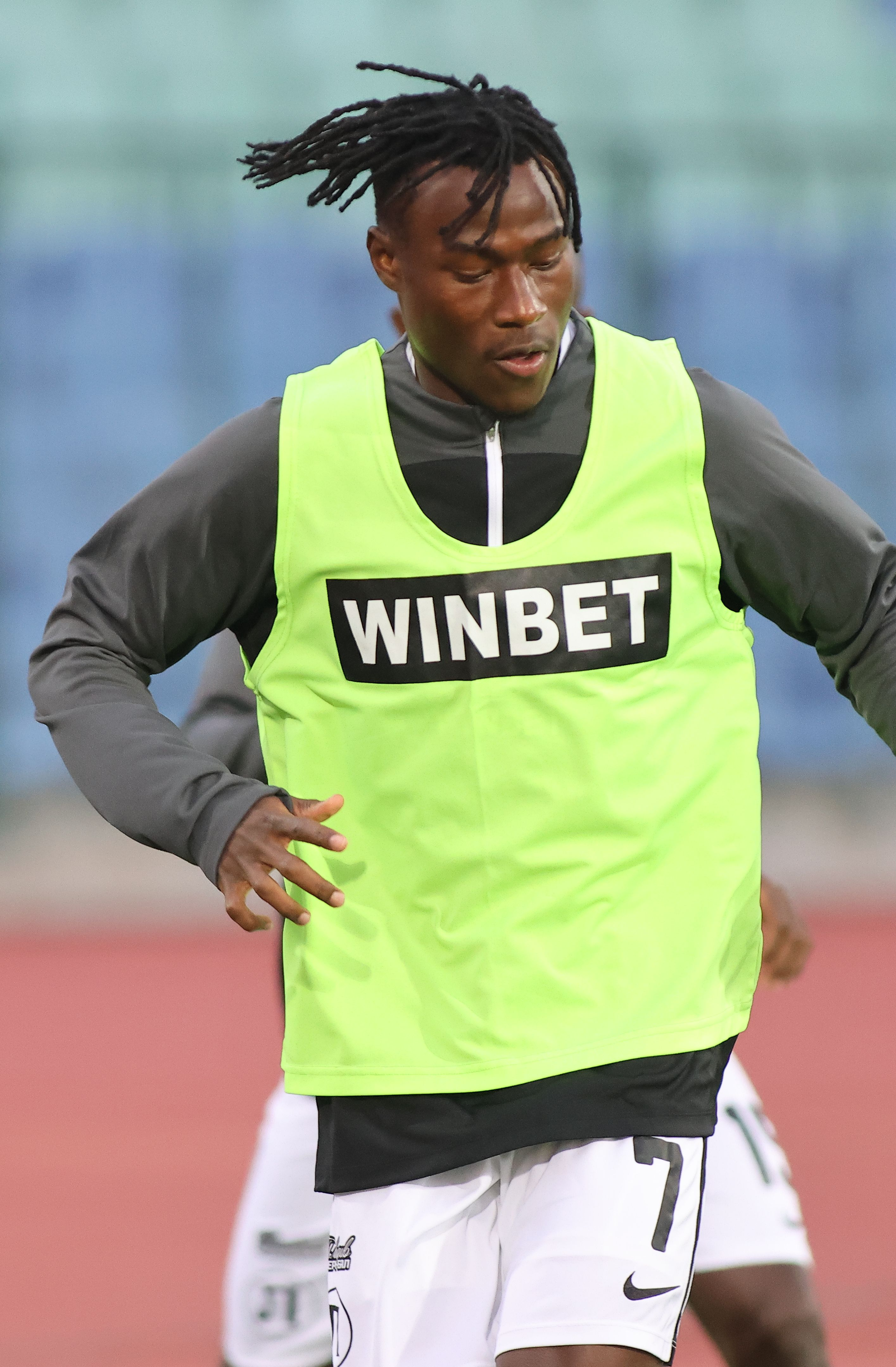

Personal information
- Date of birth: 22 March 1997 (age 29)
- Place of birth: Mbayard, Senegal
- Height: 1.67 m (5 ft 6 in)
- Position: Striker

Team information
- Current team: Anorthosis
- Number: 11

Youth career
- –2016: Zulte Waregem
- 2016–2017: Mouscron

Senior career*
Years	Team	Apps	(Gls)
2017–2022	Mouscron	16	(1)
2022–2024	Lokomotiv Plovdiv	68	(9)
2024–2025	Apollon Limassol	20	(2)
2025–	Anorthosis	13	(0)
- * Club domestic league appearances and goals as of 14 June 2026

Babacar Dione (born 22 March 1997) is a Belgian-Senegalese professional footballer who plays as a striker for Anorthosis.

== Personal life ==
Born in Senegal, Dione moved with his parents to Belgium in early age.

== Career statistics ==
=== Club ===
As of 2 October 2025

Club	Season	Division	League		Cup		Europe		Other		Total	
Club	Season	Division	Apps	Goals	Apps	Goals	Apps	Goals	Apps	Goals	Apps	Goals
Mouscron	2016–17	First Division A	1	0	0	0	—		—		1	0
Mouscron	2017–18	First Division A	1	0	0	0	—		—		1	0
Mouscron	2018–19	First Division A	10	1	0	0	—		—		10	1
Mouscron	2019–20	First Division A	2	0	0	0	—		—		2	0
Mouscron	2020–21	First Division A	0	0	0	0	—		—		0	0
Mouscron	2021–22	First Division B	2	0	1	0	—		—		3	0
Mouscron	Total		16	1	1	0	—		—		17	1
Lokomotiv Plovdiv	2022–23	First League	35	4	2	0	—		—		37	4
Lokomotiv Plovdiv	2023–24	First League	33	5	2	2	—		—		35	7
Lokomotiv Plovdiv	Total		68	9	4	2	—		—		72	11
Apollon Limassol	2024–25	Cypriot First Division	18	2	2	2	—		—		20	4
Apollon Limassol	2025–26	Cypriot First Division	2	0	0	0	—		—		2	0
Apollon Limassol	Total		20	2	0	0	—		—		22	4
Career total			104	12	5	2	0	0	0	0	111	16
