= Petar Zanev =

Bulgarian footballer

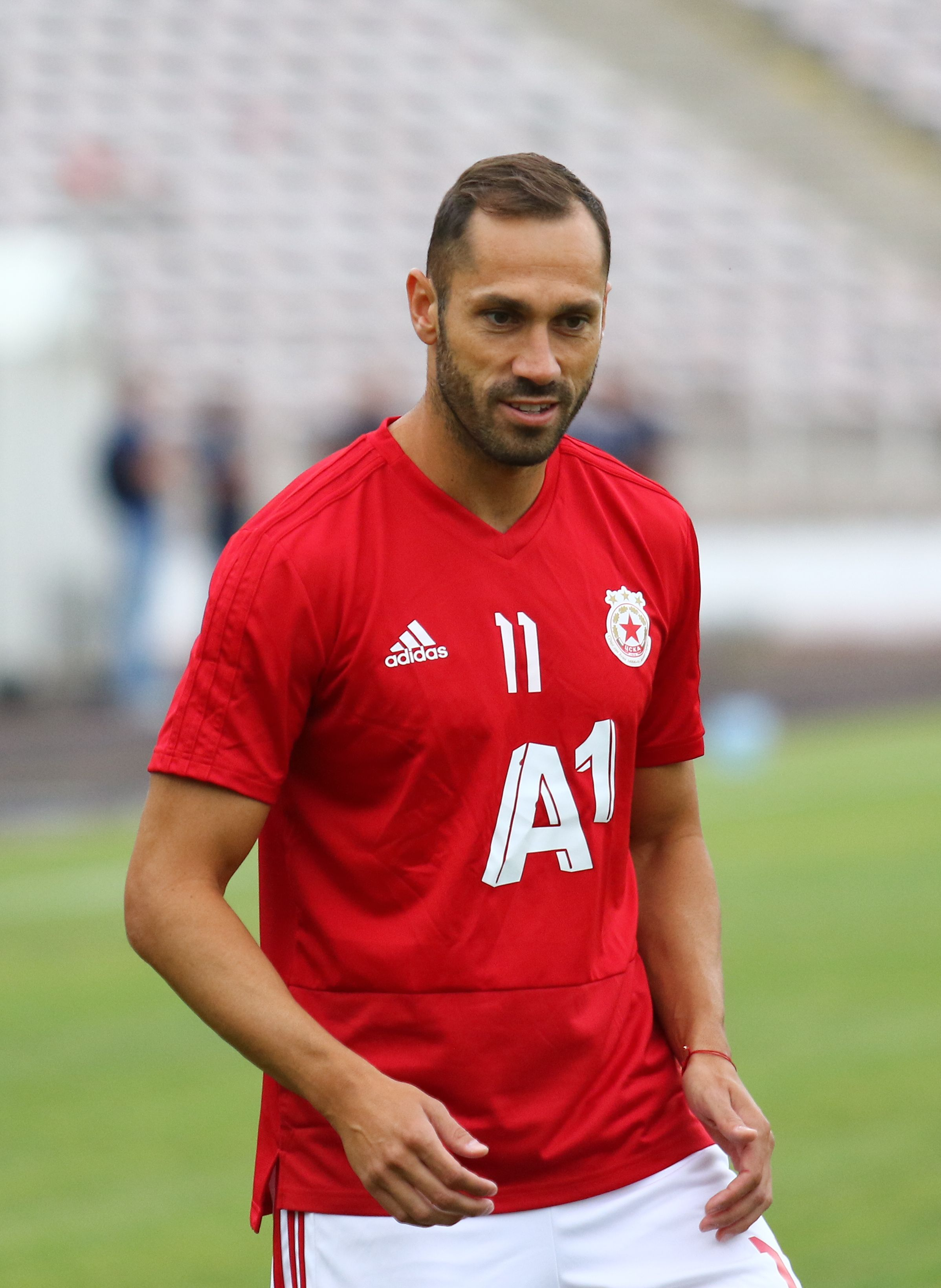
- Zanev in 2019

Personal information
- Full name: Petar Dimitrov Zanev
- Date of birth: 18 October 1985 (age 41)
- Place of birth: Gotse Delchev, Bulgaria
- Height: 1.83 m (6 ft 0 in)
- Positions: Left back; centre back

Team information
- Current team: CSKA Sofia (Coordinator)

Senior career*
Years	Team	Apps	(Gls)
2003–2005	Pirin Blagoevgrad	15	(1)
2005–2012	Litex Lovech	124	(4)
2007–2008	→ Celta Vigo (loan)	3	(0)
2008	→ Racing Ferrol (loan)	14	(0)
2012–2013	Volyn Lutsk	22	(0)
2013–2018	Amkar Perm	115	(2)
2018–2019	Yenisey Krasnoyarsk	15	(1)
2019–2021	CSKA Sofia	45	(1)
2021–2022	Pirin Blagoevgrad	43	(2)
Total		396	(11)

International career
2006–2021	Bulgaria	46	(0)
- * Club domestic league appearances and goals

Petar Dimitrov Zanev (Bulgarian: Петър Димитров Занев; born 18 October 1985) is a Bulgarian retired footballer who played as a left back.

== Club career ==
Zanev was born in Gotse Delchev and joined the youth system of his hometown club Pirin at an early age. In early 2005 he signed with Litex Lovech.

=== Celta (loan) ===
On 17 June 2007, Celta manager Hristo Stoichkov unveiled Zanev as the club's first signing ahead of 2007–08 season. On the next day, Zanev signed for the Spanish Segunda División side on a season-long loan deal, with the club having the option to make the move permanent. On 26 August, he made his league debut in their 1–1 draw against Córdoba CF, but spent most of his time with Celta on the bench, making only three appearances. Because of this, midway through the season his contract was terminated.

=== Racing Ferrol (loan) ===
On 9 January 2008, Racing Ferrol confirmed Zanev has joined on loan until the end of the season. He made his debut on 27 January in a 3–1 away win over SD Eibar, coming on as a substitute for Jonathan Pereira. Zanev appeared 14 times for Ferrol in the Segunda División.

=== Return to Litex ===
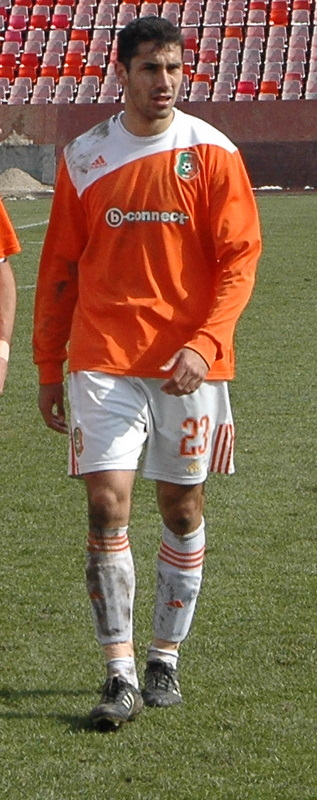
Zanev playing for Litex Lovech in 2009

Zanev returned to Litex Lovech at the end of the 2007–08 season. On 18 May 2011, he scored his second league goal in his career in a 4–1 win over Montana. Zanev's third official goal for Litex came on 19 July 2011, netting the first of a 3–0 home win over Mogren Budva in the second qualifying round of the Champions League, this also being Zanev's first European goal.

=== Volyn Lutsk ===
In early July 2012, Zanev signed a three-year contract with Ukrainian club Volyn Lutsk.

=== Amkar Perm ===
Zanev signed with Russian Premier League side Amkar Perm on 30 June 2013 on a three-year deal. He was given the number 3 jersey.

=== Yenisey Krasnoyarsk ===
On 25 June 2018, following the bankruptcy of Amkar, he joined FC Yenisey Krasnoyarsk that was promoted for the first time into the Russian Premier League. He left Yenisey on 3 April 2019.

=== CSKA Sofia ===
On 29 May 2019 CSKA Sofia announced to have signed a contract with Zanev, following a period when he was training with the team.

== International career ==
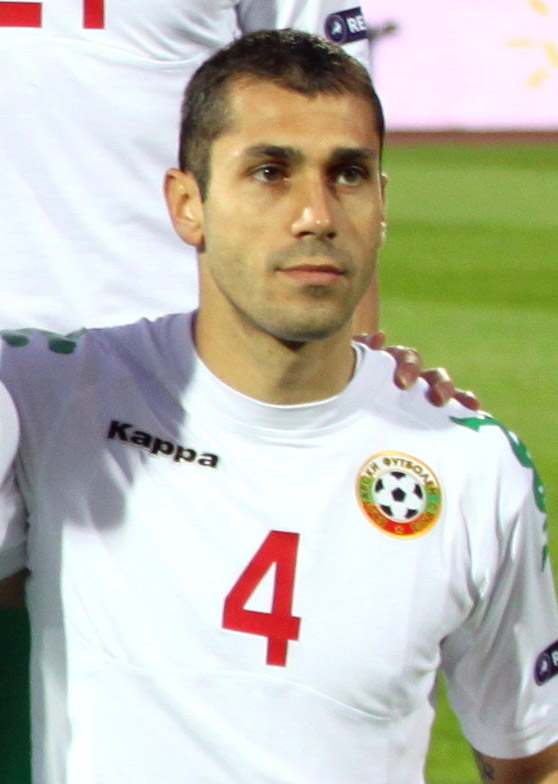
Zanev with Bulgaria in 2011

In 2006 Hristo Stoichkov called up the left back to the Bulgaria national team. Zanev made his official debut for Bulgaria in a friendly match against Slovakia on 15 November 2006. The result of the match was a 1:3 loss for Bulgaria. He was sent off (after receiving a second caution) for the first time on 15 October 2013, in the 0:1 home loss against the Czech Republic in a World Cup qualifier. After being overlooked for the Euro 2016 qualifiers, Zanev's good performances in the Russian Premier League saw him make a return to the national side for the 2018 World Cup qualification matches. On 7 October 2017, he captained the national team, in the 0:1 home loss against France in a 2018 World Cup qualifier.

== Career statistics ==
As of 31 October 2021

Club	Season	League		Cup		Europe		Other		Total	
Club	Season	Apps	Goals	Apps	Goals	Apps	Goals	Apps	Goals	Apps	Goals
Pirin Blagoevgrad	2003–04	5	0	0	0	–		–		5	0
Pirin Blagoevgrad	2004–05	7	0	1	0	–		–		8	0
Pirin Blagoevgrad	Total	12	0	1	0	0	0	0	0	13	0
Litex Lovech	2004–05	3	0	0	0	0	0	–		3	0
Litex Lovech	2005–06	11	0	1	0	3	0	–		15	0
Litex Lovech	2006–07	18	1	5	0	3	1	–		26	2
Celta (loan)	2007–08	3	0	0	0	–		–		3	0
Racing Ferrol (loan)	2007–08	14	0	0	0	–		–		14	0
Litex Lovech	2008–09	19	0	2	0	1	0	–		22	0
Litex Lovech	2009–10	19	0	1	0	2	0	–		22	0
Litex Lovech	2010–11	27	1	3	0	5	0	–		35	1
Litex Lovech	2011–12	27	2	3	0	3	1	–		33	3
Litex Lovech	Total	124	4	15	0	17	2	0	0	156	6
Volyn Lutsk	2012–13	22	0	2	0	–		–		24	0
Amkar Perm	2013–14	15	0	0	0	–		–		15	0
Amkar Perm	2014–15	24	0	1	0	–		–		25	0
Amkar Perm	2015–16	23	0	4	0	–		–		27	0
Amkar Perm	2016–17	29	1	2	0	–		–		31	1
Amkar Perm	2017–18	24	1	2	0	–		2 (Note: Two appearances in relegation play-offs)	0	28	1
Amkar Perm	Total	115	2	9	0	0	0	2	0	126	2
Yenisey Krasnoyarsk	2018–19	15	1	1	0	–		–		16	1
CSKA Sofia	2019–20	26	1	5	0	3	0	–		34	1
CSKA Sofia	2020–21	19	0	1	0	4	0	–		24	0
CSKA Sofia	Total	45	1	6	0	7	0	0	0	58	1
Pirin Blagoevgrad	2021–22	13	1	1	0	–		–		14	1
Career total		363	9	35	0	24	2	2	0	424	11

=== International ===
As of match played 31 March 2021

Appearances and goals by national team and year
National team	Year	Apps	Goals
Bulgaria	2007	4	0
Bulgaria	2010	3	0
Bulgaria	2011	8	0
Bulgaria	2012	4	0
Bulgaria	2013	3	0
Bulgaria	2014	1	0
Bulgaria	2015	2	0
Bulgaria	2016	1	0
Bulgaria	2017	6	0
Bulgaria	2018	5	0
Bulgaria	2019	5	0
Bulgaria	2020	2	0
Bulgaria	2021	2	0
Total		46	0

== Honours ==
Litex Lovech

- A Group: 2009–10, 2010–11
- Bulgarian Cup: 2008–09
- Bulgarian Supercup: 2010

CSKA Sofia

- Bulgarian Cup: 2020–21
