= 2010–11 B Group =

Bulgarian B Group
- Season: 2010–11
- Champions: Botev Vratsa (West); Ludogorets (East)
- Promoted: Ludogorets; Botev Vratsa; Svetkavitsa
- Relegated: Vihren; Botev Krivodol; Kom-Minyor; Spartak Plovdiv; Brestnik; Chernomorets Balchik; Dunav Ruse; Ravda
- Matches: 396
- Goals: 573 (1.45 per match)

The 2010–11 B Group was the 55th season of the Bulgarian B Football Group, the second tier of the Bulgarian football league system. The season started on 31 July 2010 and finished in May 2011 with the A Group promotion play-off.

On 3 June the Executive Committee of Bulgarian Football Union decided to reduce the number of teams in both West and East B PFG due to the licensing problems that occurred in the last 5 years. The new format will consist 12 teams in each group playing three times during the season. The draw for the third matches will be conducted after Round 22 based in the Berger tables. The same principles were used in the first level football leagues in Macedonia and Montenegro.

There is also change regarding the A Group promotion play-off. Since this season it will be played in two stages. The first will be the match between the runners-up from the East and West B PFG. The final stage will be played between the 14th finished team from A Group and the winner from the first stage.

== Team changes from 2009–10 ==
=== Movement between A Group and B Group ===
The champions of the two B Group 2009/10 divisions were promoted to the A Group 2010/11. These were Kaliakra Kavarna (East) and Vidima-Rakovski Sevlievo (West).

Lokomotiv Mezdra, Sportist Svoge and Botev Plovdiv were relegated from A Group 2009/10 after finishing in the bottom three places. Botev and Lokomotiv did not even receive license for the B Group, so they will participate in 2010-11 V AFG

=== Movement between B Group and third-level leagues ===
Rodopa Smolyan and Belite Orli Pleven declared bankruptcy during the winter break and so relegated from respectively East B PFG and West B PFG. Bdin Vidin finished in 15th place in West B PFG and relegated to the Bulgarian North-West V AFG.

The relegated teams were replaced by teams from the third-level leagues of the Bulgarian league pyramid and allocated to one of the two divisions. Dorostol Silistra as winners of a North-East V AFG and Ravda as winners of South-East V AFG joined the Eastern division. Malesh Mikrevo as winners of South-West V AFG and Chavdar Byala Slatina as winners of North-West V AFG were included to the Western division.

On 20 July AKB Minyor Radnevo declared that their financial status would not be secured, so they were removed from East B PFG. It is not clear what the future of AKB Minyor would be. On 27 July the Executive committee of Bulgarian Football Union decided that the new member of East B PFG will be FC Razgrad 2000. At the same time FC Razgrad renamed themselves and from this season they will be PFC Ludogorets Razgrad.

=== Reducing the size of the divisions ===
Because of the reducing the size of the divisions, some teams from both East and West B Group lost their license. The teams of Spartak Varna, Volov Shumen, Svilengrad and Botev Plovdiv, which should play in East B PFG this season, did not receive professional license and so were relegated to the next division levels. The same is the case with the following teams from West B PFG - Marek Dupnitsa, Balkan Botevgrad, Rislki Sportist Samokov and Lokomotiv Mezdra.

== East B Group ==
=== Stadia and locations ===
Location of teams in East B PFG 2010-11

| Team | City | Stadium | Capacity | Notes |
|---|---|---|---|---|
| Brestnik 1948 | Brestnik | Berkut | 7,000 | 6th in 2009/10 |
| Chernomorets Balchik | Balchik | Balchik | 2,500 | 8th in 2009/10 |
| Chernomorets Pomorie | Pomorie | Pomorie | 3,000 | 7th in 2009/10 |
| Dobrudzha | Dobrich | Druzhba | 12,500 | 13th in 2009/10 |
| Dorostol | Silistra | Louis Ayer | 12,000 | Promoted from Third Division (North East) |
| Dunav | Ruse | Gradski Stadium | 22,000 | 3rd in 2009/10 |
| Ludogorets | Razgrad | Dyanko Stefanov | 12,000 | Promoted from Third Division (North East) |
| Lyubimetz 2007 | Lyubimets | Lyubimetz | 5,000 | 5th in 2009/10 |
| Nesebar | Nesebar | Nesebar | 10,000 | 2nd in 2009/10 |
| Ravda | Ravda | Nesebar | 10,000 | Promoted from Third Division (South East) |
| Svetkavitsa | Targovishte | Svetkavitsa | 7,000 | 11th in 2009/10 |
| Spartak Plovdiv | Plovdiv | Todor Diev | 3,548 | 4th in 2009/10 |

=== League table ===
| Pos | Team | Pld | W | D | L | GF | GA | GD | Pts | Promotion or relegation |
|---|---|---|---|---|---|---|---|---|---|---|
| 1 | Ludogorets Razgrad (C, P) | 24 | 12 | 8 | 4 | 38 | 16 | +22 | 44 | Promotion to 2011–12 A Group |
| 2 | Chernomorets Pomorie | 24 | 9 | 9 | 6 | 23 | 19 | +4 | 36 | Qualification for Promotion Play-Off |
| 3 | Spartak Plovdiv (R) | 24 | 10 | 6 | 8 | 26 | 17 | +9 | 36 | Relegation to 2011–12 V Group |
| 4 | Svetkavitsa Targovishte (P) | 24 | 8 | 9 | 7 | 24 | 23 | +1 | 33 | Promotion to 2011–12 A Group |
| 5 | Nesebar | 24 | 9 | 5 | 10 | 20 | 22 | −2 | 32 | |
| 6 | Lyubimets | 24 | 7 | 9 | 8 | 22 | 26 | −4 | 30 | |
| 7 | Dorostol Silistra | 24 | 7 | 7 | 10 | 18 | 22 | −4 | 28 | |
| 8 | Brestnik (R) | 24 | 6 | 8 | 10 | 21 | 29 | −8 | 26 | Relegation to 2011–12 V Group |
| 9 | Dobrudzha Dobrich | 24 | 7 | 5 | 12 | 14 | 30 | −16 | 26 | |
| – | Chernomorets Balchik (Note: Chernomorets Balchik decided to cancel their participation in the championship during the winter break after the city municipality decided not to continue its financial support for the club. All its results are annulled and their opponents will rest if they should play against them.) (R) | 14 | 5 | 6 | 3 | 11 | 7 | +4 | 21 | Relegation to 2011–12 V Group |
| – | Dunav Ruse (Note: Dunav Ruse decided to cancel their participation in the championship during the winter break due to financial difficulties. All its results are annulled and their opponents will rest if they should play against them.) (R) | 14 | 3 | 5 | 6 | 8 | 14 | −6 | 14 | Relegation to 2011–12 V Group |
| – | Ravda (Note: Ravda decided to cancel their participation in the championship after Round 10 due "unacceptable results". All its results are annulled and their opponents will rest if they should play against them.) (R) | 10 | 1 | 1 | 8 | 12 | 27 | −15 | 4 | Relegation to 2011–12 V Group |

Source: Soccerway
Rules for classification: 1) points; 2) goal difference; 3) number of goals scored.
(C) Champions; (P) Promoted; (R) Relegated

=== Top goalscorers ===
| Rank | Scorer | Club | Goals |
|---|---|---|---|
| 1 | (Bulgaria) Petar Atanasov | Brestnik | 11 |
| 2 | (Bulgaria) Petar Kolev | Ravda | 9 |
| 2 | (Bulgaria) Todor Kolev | Ludogorets | 9 |
| 2 | (Bulgaria) Vasil Kaloyanov | Chernomorets Pomorie | 9 |
| 5 | (Bulgaria) Martin Stefanov | Spartak Plovdiv | 7 |

Source: Soccerway

== West B Group ==
=== Stadia and locations ===
Location of teams in West B PFG 2010-11

| Team | City | Stadium | Capacity | Notes |
|---|---|---|---|---|
| Bansko | Bansko | Saint Peter | 3,000 | 3rd in 2009/10 |
| Botev Krivodol | Krivodol | Hristo Botev | 3,000 | 10th in 2008-09 |
| Botev Vratsa | Vratsa | Hristo Botev | 32,000 | 6th in 2009/10 |
| Chavdar Byala Slatina | Byala Slatina | Chavdar | 3,000 | Promoted from Third Division (North West) |
| Chavdar Etropole | Etropole | Chavdar | 5,000 | 8th in 2009/10 |
| Etar | Veliko Tarnovo | Ivaylo | 18,000 | 5th in 2009/10 |
| Kom-Minyor | Berkovitsa | Gradski | 6,000 | 12th in 2009/10 |
| Malesh | Mikrevo | Malesh | 1,500 | Promoted from Third Division (South West) |
| Pirin | Gotse Delchev | Gradski | 8,000 | 11th in 2009/10 |
| Septemvri | Simitli | Struma | 8,000 | 7th in 2009/10 |
| Sportist | Svoge | Chavdar Tsvetkov | 3,500 | Relegated from First Division |
| Vihren | Sandanski | Sandanski | 6,000 | 4th in 2009/10 |

=== League table ===
| Pos | Team | Pld | W | D | L | GF | GA | GD | Pts | Promotion or relegation |
|---|---|---|---|---|---|---|---|---|---|---|
| 1 | Botev Vratsa (C, P) | 30 | 20 | 2 | 8 | 52 | 28 | +24 | 62 | Promotion to 2011–12 A PFG |
| 2 | Sportist Svoge | 30 | 15 | 7 | 8 | 36 | 15 | +21 | 52 | Qualification for Promotion Play-Off |
| 3 | Etar Veliko Tarnovo | 30 | 13 | 12 | 5 | 33 | 19 | +14 | 51 | |
| 4 | Bansko | 30 | 14 | 6 | 10 | 42 | 35 | +7 | 48 | |
| 5 | Chavdar Etropole | 30 | 13 | 5 | 12 | 37 | 34 | +3 | 44 | |
| 6 | Septemvri Simitli | 30 | 12 | 7 | 11 | 30 | 31 | −1 | 43 | |
| 7 | Vihren Sandanski (R) | 30 | 13 | 3 | 14 | 37 | 32 | +5 | 42 | Relegation to 2011–12 V Group |
| 8 | Pirin Gotse Delchev | 30 | 10 | 6 | 14 | 27 | 38 | −11 | 36 | |
| 9 | Chavdar Byala Slatina | 30 | 9 | 7 | 14 | 27 | 36 | −9 | 34 | |
| 10 | Malesh Mikrevo | 30 | 8 | 8 | 14 | 22 | 37 | −15 | 32 | |
| 11 | Botev Krivodol (R) | 30 | 4 | 5 | 21 | 25 | 63 | −38 | 17 | Relegation to 2011–12 V Group |
| – | Kom-Minyor (Note: Kom-Minyor decided to cancel their participation in the championship on 1 March 2011 due financial difficulties. All its results are annulled and their opponents will rest if they should play against them.) (R) | 16 | 1 | 8 | 7 | 5 | 15 | −10 | 11 | Relegation to 2011–12 V Group |

Source: Soccerway
Rules for classification: 1) points; 2) goal difference; 3) number of goals scored.
(C) Champions; (P) Promoted; (R) Relegated

=== Top goalscorers ===
| Rank | Scorer | Club | Goals |
|---|---|---|---|
| 1 | (Bulgaria) Tihomir Kanev | Etar | 11 |
| 1 | (Bulgaria) Georgi Kalaydzhiev | Bansko | 11 |
| 1 | (Bulgaria) Simeon Raykov | Botev Vratsa | 11 |
| 4 | (Bulgaria) Borislav Hazurov | Bansko | 9 |
| 4 | (Bulgaria) Aleksandar Ruskov | Vihren | 9 |
| 4 | (Bulgaria) Mario Bliznakov | Pirin Gotse Delchev | 9 |
| 4 | (Bulgaria) Ivaylo Danchev | Botev Vratsa | 9 |

Source: Soccerway

== Promotion play-off ==
8 June 2011
17:00 EEST

| Sportist Svoge | 1–2 | Chernomorets Pomorie |
|---|---|---|
| Mladenov 82' | Report | Koparanov 38'; Kostadinov 41' |

Hadzhi Dimitar, Sliven
Attendance: 600
Referee: Nikolay Yordanov (Sofia)

12 June 2011
17:00 EEST

| Vidima-Rakovski | 0–3 | Chernomorets Pomorie |
|---|---|---|
| | Report | Atanasov 57'; Kaloyanov 60', 80' |

Hadzhi Dimitar, Sliven
Attendance: 800
Referee: Stanislav Todorov
