= 2010–11 A Group =

87th season of top-tier football league in Bulgaria

A Group
- Season: 2010–11
- Dates: 31 July 2010 – 28 May 2011
- Champions: Litex Lovech (4th title)
- Relegated: Akademik Sofia; Sliven; Pirin
- Champions League: Litex Lovech
- Europa League: Levski Sofia; CSKA Sofia; Lokomotiv Sofia
- Matches: 240
- Goals: 577 (2.4 per match)
- Top goalscorer: (Mali) Garra Dembélé (26 goals)
- Biggest home win: Pirin 6–0 Akademik (14 May 2011)
- Biggest away win: Akademik 0–4 Slavia (11 September 2010); Chernomorets 0–4 CSKA Sofia (5 March 2011)
- Highest scoring: Sliven 6–1 Vidima-Rakovski (18 September 2010); Lokomotiv Sofia 4–3 Slavia (27 November 2010)

The 2010–11 A Group season was the 87th edition of the Bulgarian national top football division, and the 63rd of A Group as the top-tier football league in the country. The season commenced on 31 July 2010 and ended with the last games on 28 May 2011. The winter break was between the weekends around 29 November 2010 and 26 February 2011. Litex Lovech defended their 2009/10 A Group title and were champions for two consecutive seasons. This was the last edition until the 2025-26 season that was not won by Ludogorets Razgrad.

== Team information ==
Lokomotiv Mezdra, Sportist Svoge and Botev Plovdiv were directly relegated after finishing in the bottom three places. Lokomotiv Mezdra ended a two-year tenure, Sportist Svoge were relegated after a year in A Group, and Botev were excluded from A Group due to financial difficulties at the winter brake, ending a five-year stint in the A Group.

The relegated teams were replaced by Vidima-Rakovski, champions of West B Group and Kaliakra Kavarna, champions of the East B Group. Vidima-Rakovski returned to A Group after two years, while Kaliakra entered the top division for their first time.

A further place in the league was decided by a play-off match between the runners-up teams from the two B Group's. The game was played on 23 May 2010 between Nesebar and Akademik Sofia. Akademik won the match by 2–1 and returned to the top division after 28 years. The last season the club had played in A Group was 1981–82.

=== Stadia and locations ===
As in the previous year, the league will comprise the best thirteen teams of season 2009/10, the 2 champions of the West and East B Group's and the winners of the promotion play-off between the runners-up from the West and East B Group's.

The following teams have ensured their participation in A Group for season 2010/11 (listed in alphabetical order):

Location of teams in 2010–11 A Group
Sofia 2010–11 A Group football clubs

Team	City	Stadium	Stadium capacity
Akademik	Sofia	Ovcha Kupel^{1}	18,000
Beroe	Stara Zagora	Beroe	17,800
Cherno More	Varna	Ticha	8,250
Chernomorets	Burgas	Lazur	18,037
CSKA	Sofia	Vasil Levski^{2}	43,632
Kaliakra	Kavarna	Kavarna	5,000
Levski	Sofia	Georgi Asparuhov	29,986
Litex	Lovech	Lovech	7,050
Lokomotiv	Plovdiv	Lokomotiv	13,800
Lokomotiv	Sofia	Vasil Levski^{3}	43,632
Minyor	Pernik	Minyor	8,000
Montana	Montana	Ogosta	8,000
Pirin	Blagoevgrad	Hristo Botev	7,500
Slavia	Sofia	Ovcha Kupel	18,000
Sliven 2000	Sliven	Hadzhi Dimitar	10,000
Vidima-Rakovski	Sevlievo	Rakovski	8,816

Notes

1. Akademik Sofia will play their league home games at Ovcha Kupel Stadium in Sofia because their Akademik Stadium had not received approval from the BFU license committee.
2. CSKA Sofia will play their league home games at Vasil Levski National Stadium in Sofia because their Balgarska Armiya had not received approval from the BFU license committee.
3. Lokomotiv Sofia will play their league home games at Vasil Levski National Stadium in Sofia because their Lokomotiv Stadium had not received approval from the BFU license committee.

=== Personnel and sponsoring ===
Team	Manager	Captain	Kit Manufacturer	Shirt Sponsor
Akademik Sofia	(Bulgaria) Boris Angelov	(Bulgaria) Nikola Asenov	Saller	Bench Mark Group
Beroe Stara Zagora	(Bulgaria) Ilian Iliev	(Bulgaria) Slavi Zhekov	GUPA	Bulsatcom
Cherno More Varna	(Bulgaria) Stefan Genov	(Bulgaria) Georgi Iliev	Misho	Armeets
Chernomorets Burgas	(Bulgaria) Georgi Vasilev	(Bulgaria) Trayan Dyankov	Puma	QUARTO
CSKA Sofia	(Bulgaria) Milen Radukanov	(Bulgaria) Todor Yanchev	Uhlsport	GLOBUL
Kaliakra	(Bulgaria) Anton Zdravkov	(Bulgaria) Ivan Raychev	Uhlsport	Municipality of Kavarna
Levski Sofia	(Bulgaria) Yasen Petrov	(Bulgaria) Hristo Yovov	Nike	M-Tel
Litex Lovech	(Bulgaria) Lyuboslav Penev	(Serbia) Nebojša Jelenković	Adidas	b-connect
Lokomotiv Plovdiv	(Serbia) Saša Nikolić	(Bulgaria) Zdravko Lazarov	Uhlsport	
Lokomotiv Sofia	(Bulgaria) Dian Petkov	(Bulgaria) Kristian Dobrev	Puma	
Minyor Pernik	(Bulgaria) Stoycho Stoev	(Bulgaria) Kostadin Markov	Jumper	Municipal Insurance Company
Montana	(Bulgaria) Atanas Dzhambazki	(Bulgaria) Daniel Gadzhev	ASICS	GM Capital
Pirin Blagoevgrad	(Bulgaria) Kostadin Angelov	(Bulgaria) Veselin Stoykov	Joma	Beer Pirinsko
Slavia Sofia	(Bulgaria) Emil Velev	(Bulgaria) Bogomil Dyakov	Puma	
Sliven	(Bulgaria) Dimcho Nenov	(Bulgaria) Evgeni Karamanov	Tomy	
Vidima-Rakovski	(Bulgaria) Dimitar Todorov	(Bulgaria) Georgi Stoychev	ASICS	VIDEXIM

=== Managerial changes ===
Team	Outgoing manager(s)	Manner of departure	Date of vacancy	Position in table	Replaced by	Date of appointment
CSKA Sofia	(Bulgaria) Adalbert Zafirov (interim)	End of caretaker contract	16 May 2010	Pre-season	(Bulgaria) Pavel Dochev	13 May 2010
Slavia Sofia	(Bulgaria) Velislav Vutsov	Sacked	17 May 2010	Pre-season	(Bulgaria) Emil Velev	19 May 2010
Levski Sofia	(Bulgaria) Anton Zdravkov (Bulgaria) Georgi Ivanov	End of caretaker contract	20 May 2010	Pre-season	(Bulgaria) Yasen Petrov	20 May 2010
Pirin Blagoevgrad	(Bulgaria) Stefan Grozdanov	Leaves the club	8 June 2010	Pre-season	(Bulgaria) Yordan Bozdanski	21 June 2010
Litex Lovech	(Bulgaria) Angel Chervenkov	Sacked	5 August 2010	1st	(Bulgaria) Petko Petkov (interim)	5 August 2010
CSKA Sofia	(Bulgaria) Pavel Dochev	Sacked	16 August 2010	13th	(North Macedonia) Gjore Jovanovski	16 August 2010
Pirin Blagoevgrad	(Bulgaria) Yordan Bozdanski	Sacked	30 August 2010	14th	(Bulgaria) Kostadin Angelov	1 September 2010
Litex Lovech	(Bulgaria) Petko Petkov (interim)	End of caretaker contract	1 September 2010	4th	(Bulgaria) Luboslav Penev	2 September 2010
Minyor Pernik	(Bulgaria) Anton Velkov	Resigned	6 September 2010	16th	(Bulgaria) Stoycho Stoev	8 September 2010
Kaliakra Kavarna	(Bulgaria) Filip Filipov	Sacked	6 October 2010	13th	(Bulgaria) Anton Zdravkov	7 October 2010
CSKA Sofia	(North Macedonia) Gjore Jovanovski	Sacked	21 October 2010	9th	(Bulgaria) Milen Radukanov	21 October 2010
Cherno More Varna	(Bulgaria) Velizar Popov	Resigned	23 October 2010	10th	(Bulgaria) Stefan Genov	23 October 2010
Lokomotiv Sofia	(Bulgaria) Dimitar Vasev	Sacked	22 November 2010	5th	(Bulgaria) Dian Petkov (interim)	22 November 2010
Sliven	(Serbia) Dragoljub Simonović	Resigned	4 December 2010	15th	(Bulgaria) Dimcho Nenov	10 January 2011
Chernomorets Burgas	(Bulgaria) Krasimir Balakov	Resigned	7 December 2010	3rd	(Bulgaria) Anton Velkov	23 December 2010
Chernomorets Burgas	(Bulgaria) Anton Velkov	Sacked	21 March 2011	7th	(Bulgaria) Georgi Vasilev	21 March 2011
Lokomotiv Plovdiv	(Bulgaria) Nedelcho Matushev	Sacked	26 April 2011	5th	(Serbia) Saša Nikolić	26 April 2011

== League table ==
Pos	Team	Pld	W	D	L	GF	GA	GD	Pts	Qualification or relegation
1	Litex Lovech (C)	30	23	6	1	56	13	+43	75	Qualification for Champions League second qualifying round
2	Levski Sofia	30	23	3	4	67	24	+43	72	Qualification for Europa League third qualifying round
3	CSKA Sofia	30	18	7	5	53	26	+27	61	Qualification for Europa League play-off round (Note: CSKA Sofia have won the 2010–11 Bulgarian Cup competition and therefore qualified for the play-off round of the 2011–12 UEFA Europa League.)
4	Lokomotiv Sofia	30	16	4	10	47	33	+14	52 (Note: Lokomotiv Sofia ahead of Lokomotiv Plovdiv on head-to-head record; Lokomotiv Sofia–Lokomotiv Plovdiv 3–0, Lokomotiv Plovdiv–Lokomotiv Sofia 0–0.)	Qualification for Europa League second qualifying round
5	Lokomotiv Plovdiv	30	14	10	6	54	28	+26	52	
6	Cherno More	30	15	6	9	36	28	+8	51	
7	Beroe	30	13	7	10	33	34	−1	46	
8	Chernomorets Burgas	30	9	10	11	19	28	−9	37	
9	Minyor Pernik	30	10	6	14	33	45	−12	36	
10	Montana	30	8	8	14	30	46	−16	32 (Note: Montana ahead of Slavia Sofia on head-to-head record; Slavia Sofia–Montana 3–2, Montana–Slavia Sofia 1–0.)	
11	Slavia Sofia	30	9	5	16	34	38	−4	32	
12	Kaliakra	30	8	6	16	19	40	−21	30	
13	Pirin Blagoevgrad (R)	30	6	9	15	32	39	−7	27	Relegation to 2011–12 V Group (Note: The team did not receive a license for professional football for the next season.)
14	Vidima-Rakovski (O)	30	6	7	17	26	52	−26	25	Qualification for relegation play-off
15	Akademik Sofia (R)	30	5	5	20	16	51	−35	20	Relegation to 2011–12 B Group
16	Sliven (R)	30	4	7	19	22	52	−30	19	Relegation to 2011–12 B Group

Source: A PFG (in Bulgarian)
Rules for classification: 1st points; 2nd head-to-head points; 3rd head-to-head goal difference; 4th head-to-head goals scored; 5th head-to-head away goals scored; 6th goal difference; 7th goals scored
(C) Champions; (O) Play-off winners; (R) Relegated

== Results ==
Home \ Away	AKD	BSZ	CHM	CHB	CSK	KAV	LEV	LIT	LPL	LSO	MIN	MON	PIR	SLA	OFC	VRA
Akademik Sofia		1–3	0–0	1–1	1–1	0–1	0–3	0–3	1–2	2–3	2–0	1–0	1–0	0–4	0–1	1–2
Beroe	1–0		0–0	0–0	0–2	2–0	2–3	1–1	1–0	1–0	2–0	2–1	0–0	2–1	1–0	1–1
Cherno More	1–0	1–0		0–1	1–0	2–0	2–3	0–1	1–1	1–0	3–0	0–0	2–1	3–2	3–0	5–0
Chernomorets Burgas	0–0	0–2	1–2		0–4	0–1	2–1	0–1	1–2	2–1	0–0	0–1	1–0	2–1	0–0	1–0
CSKA Sofia	3–1	3–2	1–0	1–2		0–0	0–1	1–1	1–0	3–1	2–0	2–0	2–2	1–0	2–0	1–0
Kaliakra	0–1	2–2	4–0	1–1	0–3		0–3	0–1	1–3	0–1	2–1	0–0	0–0	0–1	2–1	1–0
Levski Sofia	1–0	2–1	1–0	1–0	1–3	3–0		2–0	1–2	3–1	4–0	3–0	4–1	3–0	5–0	2–0
Litex Lovech	2–0	4–0	3–1	0–0	0–0	0–0	2–1		1–0	1–0	2–1	4–1	2–1	2–0	4–0	4–0
Lokomotiv Plovdiv	3–0	1–1	2–0	2–0	4–1	5–0	2–3	2–2		0–0	3–0	4–0	2–2	1–1	3–0	3–0
Lokomotiv Sofia	2–0	3–0	1–1	2–1	2–2	4–0	0–2	1–3	3–0		0–3	2–0	2–0	4–3	3–0	2–1
Minyor Pernik	1–0	2–0	1–1	0–1	2–4	1–0	0–0	0–3	2–2	1–3		1–0	1–0	1–2	4–1	2–1
Montana	2–2	2–1	4–0	0–0	1–4	3–2	0–3	0–2	1–1	0–1	3–1		3–0	1–0	2–2	1–1
Pirin Blagoevgrad	6–0	2–0	0–1	1–1	0–1	1–0	2–3	1–2	1–1	2–1	1–1	3–0		0–2	2–1	1–1
Slavia Sofia	2–0	1–2	0–1	0–1	1–0	0–1	2–2	0–1	2–1	0–1	1–2	3–2	1–1		0–0	2–0
OFC Sliven	3–0	0–1	1–3	0–0	1–3	0–1	1–1	0–1	0–1	0–2	0–3	1–1	1–0	1–1		6–1
Vidima-Rakovski	0–1	1–2	0–1	3–0	2–2	1–0	1–2	0–3	1–1	1–1	2–2	0–1	2–1	2–1	2–1	

Source: A PFG (in Bulgarian)
Legend: Blue = home team win; Yellow = draw; Red = away team win.

== Positions by round ==
Team ╲ Round	1	2	3	4	5	6	7	8	9	10	11	12	13	14	15	16	17	18	19	20	21	22	23	24	25	26	27	28	29	30
Litex Lovech	1	3	2	5	4	6	5	4	2	2	1	1	1	1	1	1	1	1	1	1	1	1	1	1	1	1	1	1	1	1
Levski Sofia	3	1	4	2	2	1	1	1	1	1	2	2	2	2	2	2	2	2	2	2	2	2	2	2	2	2	2	2	2	2
CSKA Sofia	14	16	13	11	9	9	9	9	8	9	8	7	6	4	5	5	3	3	3	3	3	3	3	3	3	3	3	3	3	3
Lokomotiv Sofia	3	9	5	3	3	4	2	2	4	4	4	4	4	5	4	3	4	4	4	4	4	4	4	5	4	4	4	4	4	4
Lokomotiv Plovdiv	6	2	1	4	7	7	7	6	6	6	7	5	5	7	6	4	5	5	5	5	6	5	5	4	5	5	6	6	5	5
Cherno More	1	9	6	8	11	8	8	8	9	7	10	9	9	9	9	9	7	8	6	6	5	7	6	6	6	6	5	5	6	6
Beroe	10	11	9	6	5	3	6	7	7	8	6	8	8	8	7	7	8	7	8	7	7	6	7	7	7	7	7	7	7	7
Chernomorets Burgas	8	5	3	1	1	2	4	3	3	3	3	3	3	3	3	6	6	6	7	8	9	9	8	8	8	8	8	8	8	8
Minyor Pernik	12	15	16	16	16	16	15	15	15	15	15	16	15	15	13	13	13	11	11	10	10	10	10	10	10	10	10	10	9	9
Montana	14	13	8	10	8	10	10	10	10	10	9	10	10	10	10	10	10	10	10	11	11	11	11	11	11	11	11	11	10	10
Slavia Sofia	14	8	12	7	6	5	3	5	5	5	5	6	7	6	8	8	9	9	9	9	8	8	9	9	9	9	9	9	11	11
Kaliakra	3	6	10	12	10	11	11	11	13	12	12	13	11	11	11	11	12	13	13	13	13	14	14	14	14	12	12	13	12	12
Pirin Blagoevgrad	12	7	11	13	13	12	13	12	11	11	11	12	13	13	14	14	15	15	16	15	15	15	13	12	12	13	13	12	13	13
Vidima-Rakovski	6	3	7	9	12	13	14	14	14	16	16	15	16	16	16	16	16	16	15	16	16	16	16	15	15	14	14	14	14	14
Akademik Sofia	8	12	14	15	15	15	16	16	16	14	14	11	12	12	12	12	11	12	12	12	12	12	12	13	13	15	15	15	15	15
OFC Sliven	10	14	15	14	14	14	12	13	12	13	13	14	14	14	15	15	14	14	14	14	14	13	15	16	16	16	16	16	16	16

== Relegation playoff ==
8 June 2011
17:00 EEST

Sportist Svoge	1–2	Chernomorets Pomorie
Mladenov 82'	(Report)	Koparanov 38'; Kostadinov 41'

Hadzhi Dimitar Stadium, Sliven
Attendance: 600
Referee: Nikolay Yordanov (Sofia)

12 June 2011
17:00 EEST

Vidima-Rakovski	0–3	Chernomorets Pomorie
	Report	Atanasov 57'; Kaloyanov 60', 80'

Hadzhi Dimitar Stadium, Sliven
Attendance: 800
Referee: Stanislav Todorov (Shumen)

Chernomorets Pomorie wasn't allowed to compete in the next season, so there will be 2 play-offs. The first will be between the teams that lost against Chernomorets Pomorie, Vidima-Rakovski and Sportist Svoge. The other will be between Svetkavitsa and FC Etar Veliko Tarnovo (the 3rd teams in the West and East B Group) for the Pirin Blagoevgrad's place.

17 June 2011
17:00 EEST

Svetkavitsa	3–1	Etar
Genov 24'; Stoyanov 46'; Shokolarov 90+2'	Report	Kanev 4'

Hadzhi Dimitar Stadium, Sliven
Attendance: 2500
Referee: Aleksandar Kostadinov (Sofia)

26 June 2011
17:00 EEST

Sportist Svoge	1–1	Vidima-Rakovski
P. Vasilev 35'	Report	Gospodinov 88' (pen.)
Penalties
Stoev (penalty scored); Mladenov (penalty missed); Mutafov (penalty missed); Borisov (penalty scored); Valentinov (penalty missed)	2–3	Gospodinov (penalty scored); Andonov (penalty scored); A. Ivanov (penalty missed); Ashimov (penalty scored)

Hristo Botev Stadium, Vratsa
Referee: Ahmed Ahmed (Burgas)

== Champions ==
Litex Lovech

Goalkeepers
1	(Serbia) Uroš Golubović	2	(0)
30	(Bulgaria) Evgeni Aleksandrov	1	(0)
31	(Brazil) Vinícius Barrivieira	26	(0)

Defenders
2	(France) Alexandre Barthe	21	(3)
3	(Bulgaria) Petar Zanev	27	(1)
4	(Bosnia and Herzegovina) Džemal Berberović	23	(0)
5	(Bulgaria) Mihail Venkov	12	(0)
6	(Bulgaria) Ivaylo Petkov	5	(1)
16	(Bulgaria) Strahil Popov	3	(0)
18	(Bulgaria) Iliya Milanov	6	(0)
22	(Bulgaria) Plamen Nikolov	24	(0)
33	(Bulgaria) Nikolay Bodurov	25	(2)

Midfielders
7	(Bulgaria) Hristo Yanev	27	(5)
8	(Brazil) Tom	18	(1)
10	(Brazil) Sandrinho	10	(1)
15	(Brazil) Doka Madureira	22	(12)
17	(Bulgaria) Georgi Milanov	27	(4)
19	(Bulgaria) Rumen Rumenov	6	(0)
20	(Brazil) Neném	0	(0)
21	(Bulgaria) Aleksandar Tsvetkov	14	(0)
22	(Bulgaria) Simeon Slavchev	1	(0)
23	(Serbia) Nebojša Jelenković	22	(0)
24	(Bulgaria) Angel Zdravchev	1	(0)
27	(Bulgaria) Momchil Tsvetanov	22	(3)

Forwards
9	(Bulgaria) Svetoslav Todorov	25	(8)
11	(Senegal) Papa Diouf	14	(2)
14	(Slovenia) Dejan Djermanović	12	(3)
	(France) Wilfried Niflore*	12	(6)
	(Bulgaria) Ivelin Popov*	3	(0)
	(Romania) Florin Bratu*	7	(2)

Manager
(Bulgaria) Lyuboslav Penev

- Niflore, Popov and Bratu left the club during a season.

== Season statistics ==
=== Top goalscorers ===
Including matches played on 28 May 2011

Rank	Scorer	Club	Goals
1	(Mali) Garra Dembélé	Levski Sofia	26
2	(Bulgaria) Zdravko Lazarov	Lokomotiv Plovdiv	14
3	(Bulgaria) Spas Delev	CSKA Sofia	13
4	(Brazil) Doka Madureira	Litex Lovech	12
5	(Bulgaria) Tsvetan Genkov	Lokomotiv Sofia	11
5	(Bulgaria) Hristo Zlatinski	Lokomotiv Plovdiv	11
7	(Brazil) Michel Platini	CSKA Sofia	10
7	(Bulgaria) Nikolay Bozhov	Slavia Sofia	10
7	(Guinea-Bissau) Basile de Carvalho	Lokomotiv Plovdiv	10
7	(Bulgaria) Vladislav Zlatinov	Beroe Stara Zagora	10

=== Top assistants ===
Including matches played on 28 May 2011

Rank	Player	Club	Assists
1	(North Macedonia) Darko Tasevski	Levski Sofia	9
2	(Brazil) Tom	Litex Lovech	8
2	(Bulgaria) Zdravko Lazarov	Lokomotiv Plovdiv	8
4	(Brazil) Joãozinho	Levski Sofia	7
4	(Bulgaria) Hristo Yanev	Litex Lovech	7
4	(Bulgaria) Spas Delev	CSKA Sofia	7
7	(Netherlands) Gregory Nelson	CSKA Sofia	6
7	(Bulgaria) Iskren Pisarov	Lokomotiv Sofia	6
7	(Bulgaria) Marcho Dafchev	Lokomotiv Sofia	6
10	(Bulgaria) Tsvetan Genkov	Lokomotiv Sofia	5
10	(Guinea-Bissau) Basile de Carvalho	Lokomotiv Plovdiv	5
10	(Portugal) Serginho	Lokomotiv Plovdiv	5
10	(North Macedonia) Dragi Kotsev	Lokomotiv Plovdiv	5
10	(Bulgaria) Emil Gargorov	CSKA Sofia	5
10	(Bulgaria) Todor Hristov	Beroe	5
10	(Brazil) Doka Madureira	Litex Lovech	5
10	(Bulgaria) Atanas Chipilov	Montana	5

=== Scoring ===
- First goal of the season: 18:06, 31 July 2010 – (Bulgaria) Georgi Filipov for Kaliakra against Slavia (6th minute)
- Fastest goal in a match: 19 seconds – (Bulgaria) Rumen Trifonov for CSKA against Chernomorets (8 August 2010)
- First own goal of the season: (Bulgaria) Yordan Petkov (Slavia) for Beroe, 3rd round (15 August 2010)
- First hat-trick of the season: (Mali) Garra Dembélé (Levski) against Loko Sofia (9 August 2010)
- Quickest hat-trick: 25 minutes – (Mali) Garra Dembélé (Levski) against Minyor (12 September 2010)
- Widest winning margin: 5 goals
  - Sliven 2000 6–1 Vidima-Rakovski (18 September 2010)
  - Lokomotiv Plovdiv 5–0 Kaliakra (25 September 2010)
  - Cherno More 5–0 Vidima-Rakovski (9 April 2011)
- Most goals in one half: 6 goals
  - Sliven 2000 6–1 Vidima-Rakovski (5–1 at half time) (18 September 2010)
- Most goals scored by losing team: 3 goals
  - Lokomotiv Sofia 4–3 Slavia (27 November 2010)
- Highest scoring draw: 4 goals
  - Vidima-Rakovski 2–2 CSKA (14 August 2010)
  - Lokomotiv Plovdiv 2–2 Litex (22 August 2010)
  - Montana 2–2 Akademik (18 September 2010)
  - Minyor 2–2 Lokomotiv Plovdiv (2 October 2010)
  - Lokomotiv Sofia 2–2 CSKA (4 October 2010)
  - Slavia 2–2 Levski (7 November 2010)

=== Discipline ===
- First yellow card of the season: (Bulgaria) Radoslav Mitrevski for Pirin against Cherno More, 17 minutes and 25 seconds (31 July 2010)
- First red card of the season: (Bulgaria) Anton Dimitrov for Kaliakra against Slavia, 87 minutes and 14 seconds (31 July 2010)
- Most yellow cards in a single match: 10
  - Akademik 0–1 Sliven – 6 for Akademik (Pieter Mbemba, Asparuh Vasilev, Ivan Redovski, Nikola Asenov, Marcos Bonfim and Yulian Petkov) and 4 for Sliven (Petar Stoyanov, Nikolay Dimitrov, Miroslav Mindev and Dimo Bakalov) (21 August 2010)
- Most red cards in a single match: 3
  - Cherno More 3–2 Slavia – 1 for Cherno More (Ademar Júnior) and 2 for Slavia (Galin Ivanov, Victor Deniran) (17 October 2010)

== Attendances ==
#	Club	Average
1	Chernomorets	4,084
2	Beroe	3,222
3	Lokomotiv Plovdiv	3,093
4	Levski	2,811
5	CSKA Sofia	2,423
6	Minyor	2,411
7	Montana	2,310
8	Cherno More	2,023
9	Sliven	1,611
10	Lovech	1,513
11	Pirin	1,381
12	Kaliakra	988
13	Vidima-Rakovski	912
14	Slavia Sofia	725
15	Lokomotiv Sofia	311
16	Akademik Sofia	307

== See also ==
- List of Bulgarian football transfers summer 2010
- List of Bulgarian football transfers winter 2010–11
