= Ivan Minchev =

Bulgarian footballer

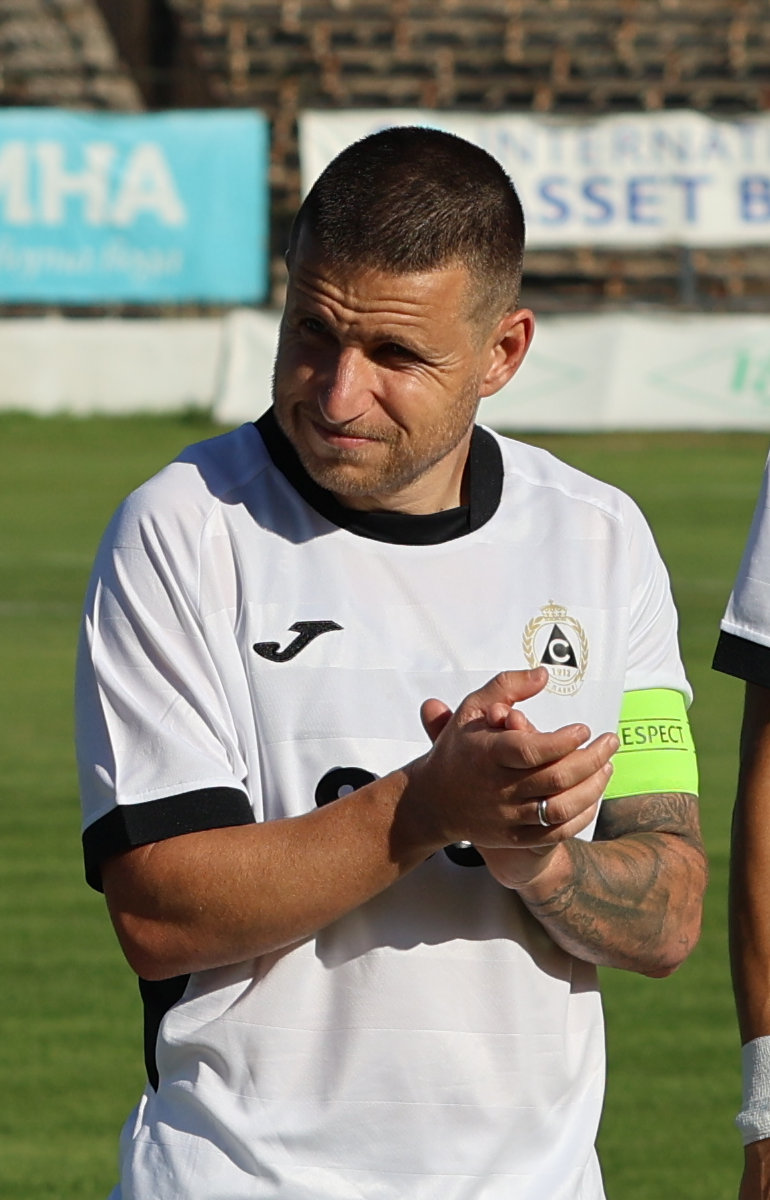

Personal information
- Full name: Ivan Stoilov Minchev
- Date of birth: 28 May 1991 (age 35)
- Place of birth: Kazanlak, Bulgaria
- Height: 1.60 m (5 ft 3 in)
- Position: Midfielder

Team information
- Current team: Slavia Sofia
- Number: 73

Youth career
- 2001–2005: Rozova Dolina
- 2005–2009: Litex Lovech
- 2009–2010: Lokomotiv Mezdra

Senior career*
Years	Team	Apps	(Gls)
2010–2013	Lyubimets 2007	86	(6)
2014	Spartak Varna	12	(2)
2014–2016	Montana	57	(11)
2016	CSKA Sofia II	2	(0)
2016	CSKA Sofia	1	(0)
2016–2018	Slavia Sofia	52	(11)
2018–2021	Beroe	83	(8)
2021	Bregalnica Štip	4	(0)
2021–	Slavia Sofia	138	(18)

International career^{‡}
2017–	Bulgaria	2	(0)
- * Club domestic league appearances and goals as of 11 June 2026 ‡ National team caps and goals as of 23:30, 5 September 2023 (UTC)

Ivan Stoilov Minchev (Bulgarian: Иван Стоилов Минчев; born 28 May 1991) is a Bulgarian professional footballer who plays as a midfielder for Slavia Sofia.

== Club career ==
=== Early career ===
Minchev began his career in his local Rozova Dolina aged 7 and moved to Litex Lovech Academy aged 15. In 2009 he moved to Lokomotiv Mezdra Academy, before moving to Lyubimets 2007 a year later.

=== CSKA Sofia ===
On 14 June 2016, Minchev signed with the returning on the top-level team of CSKA Sofia He made his debut for the CSKA II team on 7 August 2016 in a match against Sozopol, won by CSKA II with 2–0 result. A week later he completed his debut for the first team in a league match against Neftochimic Burgas.

=== Slavia Sofia ===
Three months after he joined CSKA and a single appearance for the first team, Minchev moved to Slavia Sofia. He made his debut for the team in a league match on 10 September 2017 against Lokomotiv Plovdiv won by Slavia with 5–2 result. In the league match against Vereya played on 1 October he scored his first goal for the club. On 15 April 2017, Minchev was named as Man of the Match in the league match against his ex club Montana.

On 28 November 2017, Minchev was awarded as Man of the Match in the league match against Cherno More where he scored the first goal for the 2–0 win. Minchev ended his first half of the 2017–18 season with 5 goals and 5 assists in 19 league matches, attracting interest from Russian and Kazakhstan clubs.

=== Beroe ===
On 9 June 2018, Minchev signed with Beroe Stara Zagora.

== International career ==
On 2 November 2017, Minchev received his first call-up for Bulgaria for the friendly game against Saudi Arabia. 11 days later he made his debut for the national side in a match, coming on as a substitute in added time of the second half. In August 2024, Minchev was once again called up, being selected by manager Ilian Iliev for the September UEFA Nations League matches against Belarus and Northern Ireland, earning his second cap against the former.

== Career statistics ==
=== Club ===
As of 1 August 2020

Appearances and goals by club, season and competition
Club	Season	League			Cup		Continental		Other		Total	
Club	Season	Division	Apps	Goals	Apps	Goals	Apps	Goals	Apps	Goals	Apps	Goals
Lyubimets 2007	2009–10	B Group	6	2	0	0	—		—		6	2
Lyubimets 2007	2010–11	B Group	24	1	1	0	—		—		25	1
Lyubimets 2007	2011–12	B Group	23	1	1	1	—		—		24	2
Lyubimets 2007	2012–13	B Group	22	2	2	0	—		—		24	2
Lyubimets 2007	2013–14	A Group	11	0	1	0	—		—		12	0
Lyubimets 2007	Total		86	6	5	1	0	0	0	0	91	7
Spartak Varna	2013–14	B Group	12	2	0	0	—		—		12	2
Montana	2014–15	B Group	27	5	3	1	—		—		30	6
Montana	2015–16	A Group	30	6	5	1	—		—		35	7
Montana	Total		57	11	8	2	0	0	0	0	65	13
CSKA Sofia II	2016–17	Second League	2	0	–		–		–		2	0
CSKA Sofia	2016–17	First League	1	0	0	0	–		–		1	0
Slavia Sofia	2016–17	First League	23	5	1	0	0	0	3 (Note: Appearances in Relegation Play-offs)	0	27	5
Slavia Sofia	2017–18	First League	29	6	6	2	–		–		35	8
Slavia Sofia	Total		52	11	7	2	0	0	3	0	62	13
Beroe	2018–19	First League	29	0	2	0	–		–		31	0
Beroe	2019–20	First League	29	3	2	1	–		–		31	4
Beroe	2020–21	First League	0	0	0	0	–		–		0	0
Beroe	Total		58	3	4	1	0	0	0	0	62	4
Career total			268	33	24	6	0	0	3	0	295	39

== Honours ==
Slavia Sofia

- Bulgarian Cup: 2017–18
