= Georgi Kostadinov (footballer) =

Bulgarian footballer (born 1990)

Georgi Kostadinov Георги Костадинов
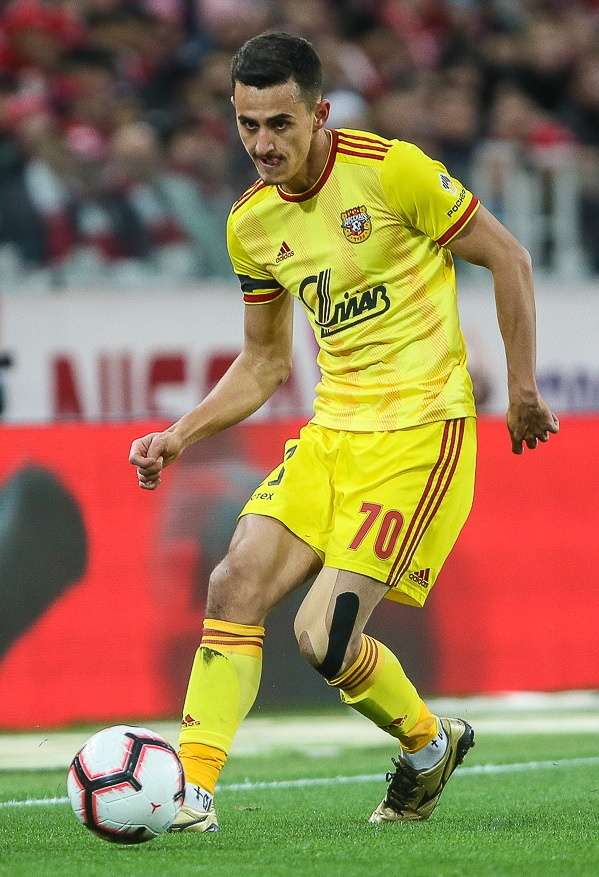
- Kostadinov with Arsenal Tula in 2018

Personal information
- Full name: Georgi Georgiev Kostadinov
- Date of birth: 7 September 1990 (age 36)
- Place of birth: Tsarevo, Bulgaria
- Height: 1.85 m (6 ft 1 in)
- Position: Defensive midfielder

Youth career
- 2004–2008: Naftex Burgas
- 2008–2009: Chernomorets Burgas

Senior career*
Years	Team	Apps	(Gls)
2007–2008	Naftex Burgas	10	(0)
2009–2011	Pomorie	53	(4)
2012–2013	Ludogorets Razgrad	12	(2)
2013–2015	Beroe	49	(8)
2015–2017	Levski Sofia	49	(8)
2017–2018	Maccabi Haifa	24	(2)
2018–2022	Arsenal Tula	95	(1)
2022–2025	APOEL	66	(4)
2025–2026	Levski Sofia	39	(2)

International career^{‡}
2011–2012	Bulgaria U21	6	(1)
2016–2024	Bulgaria	44	(3)
- * Club domestic league appearances and goals as of 25 May 2026 ‡ National team caps and goals as of 15 October 2024

Georgi Georgiev Kostadinov (Bulgarian: Георги Георгиев Костадинов; born 7 September 1990) is a Bulgarian former professional footballer. He is the current sporting director of Levski Sofia.

== Career ==
=== Early career ===
Born in Tsarevo, Kostadinov began his career with Naftex Burgas. In 2007–08, he helped Naftex win the Bulgarian U19 Championship, scoring the only goal in the final against CSKA Sofia.

In June 2009, Kostadinov joined Pomorie.

=== Ludogorets ===
On 16 January 2012, Kostadinov signed for Ludogorets Razgrad. His A Group debut was on 18 March, as a substitute against Svetkavitsa, replacing Stanislav Genchev in the 78th minute. Six minutes later he scored his first goal, netting the fourth in a 5–0 victory.

Kostadinov won two Bulgarian League titles, a Bulgarian Cup and the Bulgarian Supercup for Ludogorets, but struggled to hold down a place in the first team, totalling 13 games and two goals.

=== Beroe ===
On 19 August 2013, Kostadinov joined Beroe Stara Zagora as a free agent. He signed a two-year contract with the club and was given the number 70 shirt. Kostadinov made his debut in the same day in a 0–0 home draw against Cherno More, coming on as an 85th-minute substitute for Élio Martins. He scored his first Beroe goal on 9 March 2014, in a 3–1 away win over Chernomorets Burgas. Kostadinov spent two seasons with the club, where he scored 8 goals in 49 league matches.

=== Levski Sofia ===
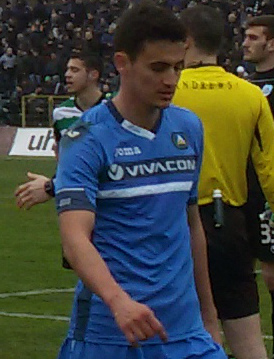
Kostadinov with Levski Sofia in 2016

After his contract with Beroe expired, Kostadinov joined Levski Sofia. On 3 July 2015, he signed a two-year contract with Levski. His competitive debut came against Botev Plovdiv in the opening game of the Bulgarian League season on 18 July, and scored his first goal for the club in a 1–1 away draw.

After two successful individual campaigns with Levski, he left the club at the end of his contract in May 2017.

=== Maccabi Haifa ===
On 22 June 2017, Kostadinov signed as a free agent for Israeli Premier League club Maccabi Haifa on a two-year contract. He made his competitive debut for the club on 29 July, playing full 90 minutes of a 2017–18 Toto Cup Al match against Bnei Sakhnin at Acre Municipal Stadium; Maccabi won 4–1. Kostadinov played his first Israeli Premier League match on the opening day of the season during their 2–0 away defeat against Bnei Yehuda on 21 August.

On 16 September 2017, Kostadinov scored his first goals in a 4–2 home win over Hapoel Ra'anana. He scored his second Maccabi goal on 5 May 2018 in a 1–1 draw at Bnei Sakhnin.

=== Arsenal Tula ===
On 1 July 2018, Kostadinov joined Russian Premier League club Arsenal Tula on a 2+1-year contract, for an undisclosed fee reported to be €200,000. On 29 July, he made his competitive debut in their season opener against Dynamo Moscow by replacing Kantemir Berkhamov for the final 32 minutes of a 0–0 home draw. On 5 October 2018, he scored his first Russian Premier League goal in a 1–1 home draw against FC Ufa.

=== APOEL ===
On 26 July 2022, Kostadinov signed with APOEL in Cyprus. He scored his first goal for the club on 17 September 2022, in a 2–0 away win over Olympiakos Nicosia.

=== Levski Sofia (second spell) ===
In February 2025, he returned to Levski Sofia, signing a contract until the summer of 2026.

== International career ==
He was called up to the senior Bulgaria squad by Ivaylo Petev for a 2018 FIFA World Cup qualifier against Luxembourg in September 2016. Kostadinov earned his first cap on 7 October under new manager Petar Hubchev, playing the full 90 minutes in the 1–4 away loss against France in another qualification match for the 2018 World Cup.

On 31 August 2017, Kostadinov scored his second international goal in a 3–2 home win against Sweden.

== Career statistics ==
=== Club ===
As of 7 August 2025

Appearances and goals by club, season and competition
Club	Season	League			Cup (Note: Includes Bulgarian Cup, Bulgarian Supercup, Israel State Cup, Toto Cup, Israel Super Cup, Cypriot Cup and Cypriot Super Cup)		Europe		Total	
Club	Season	Division	Apps	Goals	Apps	Goals	Apps	Goals	Apps	Goals
Naftex Burgas	2008–09	B Group	10	0	0	0	—		10	0
Chernomorets Pomorie	2009–10	B Group	24	1	3	0	—		27	1
Chernomorets Pomorie	2010–11	B Group	18	2	1	0	—		19	2
Chernomorets Pomorie	2011–12	B Group	11	1	0	0	—		11	1
Chernomorets Pomorie	Total		53	4	4	0	—		57	4
Ludogorets Razgrad	2011–12	A Group	5	2	0	0	—		5	2
Ludogorets Razgrad	2012–13	A Group	6	0	1	0	0	0	7	0
Ludogorets Razgrad	2013–14	A Group	1	0	0	0	0	0	1	0
Ludogorets Razgrad	Total		12	2	1	0	0	0	13	2
Beroe Stara Zagora	2013–14	A Group	19	6	0	0	0	0	19	6
Beroe Stara Zagora	2014–15	A Group	30	2	1	0	—		31	2
Beroe Stara Zagora	Total		49	8	1	0	0	0	50	8
Levski Sofia	2015–16	A Group	29	4	2	0	—		31	4
Levski Sofia	2016–17	First League	20	4	2	0	2 (Note: Appearances in UEFA Europa League)	0	24	4
Levski Sofia	Total		49	8	4	0	2	0	55	8
Maccabi Haifa	2017–18	Israeli Premier League	24	2	8	0	—		32	2
Arsenal Tula	2018–19	Russian Premier League	26	1	5	0	—		31	1
Arsenal Tula	2019–20	Russian Premier League	24	0	1	1	2	0	27	1
Arsenal Tula	2020–21	Russian Premier League	20	0	2	0	—		22	0
Arsenal Tula	2021–22	Russian Premier League	25	0	2	0	—		27	0
Arsenal Tula	Total		95	1	10	1	2	0	107	2
APOEL	2022–23	Cypriot First Division	25	2	2	0	3 (Note: Appearances in UEFA Europa Conference League)	0	30	2
APOEL	2023–24	Cypriot First Division	31	2	1	1	6	0	38	3
APOEL	2024–25	Cypriot First Division	10	0	1	0	10 (Note: Four appearances in UEFA Champions League, two appearances in UEFA Europa League, four appearances and one goal in UEFA Conference League)	1	21	1
APOEL	Total		66	4	4	1	19	1	89	6
Levski Sofia	2024–25	First League	11	1	1	0	—		12	1
Levski Sofia	2025–26	First League	2	0	0	0	4	0	6	0
Levski Sofia	Total		13	1	1	0	4	0	18	1
Career total			371	30	33	2	27	1	431	33

=== International ===
As of match played 15 October 2024

Appearances and goals by national team and year
National team	Year	Apps	Goals
Bulgaria
Bulgaria	2016	2	0
Bulgaria	2017	6	3
Bulgaria	2018	8	0
Bulgaria	2019	7	0
Bulgaria	2020	2	0
Bulgaria	2021	8	0
Bulgaria	2022	4	0
Bulgaria	2024	7	0
Total		44	3

Scores and results list Bulgaria's goal tally first, score column indicates score after each Kostadinov goal.

List of international goals scored by Georgi Kostadinov
No.	Date	Venue	Opponent	Score	Result	Competition
1	9 June 2017	Borisov Arena, Borisov, Belarus	Belarus	1–2	1–2	2018 FIFA World Cup qualification
2	31 August 2017	Vasil Levski National Stadium, Sofia, Bulgaria	Sweden	2–1	3–2	2018 FIFA World Cup qualification
3	3 September 2017	Amsterdam ArenA, Amsterdam, Netherlands	Netherlands	1–2	1–3	2018 FIFA World Cup qualification

== Honours ==
Ludogorets

- Bulgarian First League: 2011–12, 2012–13
- Bulgarian Cup: 2011–12
- Bulgarian Supercup: 2012

APOEL

- Cypriot First Division: 2023–24
- Cypriot Super Cup: 2024

Levski Sofia

- Bulgarian First League: 2025–26
