= 2011–12 V AFG =

Bulgarian V AFG
- Season: 2011–12

The 2011–12 V AFG season is the 57th season of the Bulgarian V AFG, the third tier of the Bulgarian football league system. The winners of each of the four regional groups progress to the 2012–13 B PFG, and up to four teams from each group are relegated to regional amateur championships.

== Changes from the 2010–11 season ==
=== Movement between B PFG and V AFG ===
The champions of the four 2010–11 V AFG divisions were promoted to the 2011–12 B PFG: Spartak Varna from V AFG North-East and Botev Plovdiv from V AFG South-East promoted to the B PFG East, Bdin Vidin from V AFG North-West and Slivniski Geroy Slivnitsa from V AFG South-West ascended to the B PFG West. As the East B PFG needed one more team from the third division, the two runners-up from the Eastern divisions Neftochimic Burgas and Septemvri Tervel played a special play-off on 26 June 2011. Neftohimic won the match 1:0.

In return, Chernomorets Balchik, Dunav Ruse and Ravda canceled their participation during the East B PFG championship and relegated automatically in the third division. Ravda and Dunav Ruse even dissolved themselves, so they won't participate this season. Chernomorets Balchik will participate in the North-East V AFG. Additionally two more teams - Brestnik and Spartak Plovdiv - canceled their East B PFG participation after the end of the last season and automatically relegated into the South-East V AFG.

From West B PFG relegated three teams - Kom-Minyor canceled its participation during the season and dissolved as club, Botev Krivodol will play in the North-West V AFG and Vihren Sandanski have not received a professional licence, but due financial difficulties they canceled its participation in the South-West V AFG. Additionally the team of Pirin Blagoevgrad, which have not received a license for the 2011-12 A PFG, relegated to the third division. The team is struggling financially, so they have decided not to participate in the South-West V AFG.

=== Movement from V Group to fourth-level leagues ===
In the North-East V AFG the teams of Sportist General Toshevo, Kubrat, Topolite and Shabla resigned form the championship in different stages during the season. Additionally Skrita Sila Mudrevo decided not to participate in the new season. The new teams coming from the regional divisions are Lokomotiv Kaspichan and the newly founded Dunav 2010 Ruse (which should not be confused with the dissolved Dunav Ruse). The team of Makak 2008 Shumen renamed itself and this season they will play as Shumen 2010.

The South-East V AFG was left from Gabrovnitsa Gorno Strahane and Stambolovo. The new teams are Sportist Roza and Master Burgas. Also the team of Maritsa Plovdiv united with Rakovski, so this season the team is called Rakovski 2011 and will play its games in the town of Rakovski.

The North-West V AFG was joined by Cherven Bryag and Dunav Selanovtsi. They replace Samovodene and Botev Dimovo, which could not afford their participation this season.

The new teams in the South-West V AFG are Oborishte Panagyurishte, Belasitsa Petrich, the newly founded Marek 2010 Dupnitsa and Rilski Sportist Samokov. Benovski Pazardzhik canceled their participation for the new season. Additionally the team of Lokomotiv Septemvri united with the newly founded Hebar 2011 Pazardzhik (not to be confused with Hebar Pazardzhik) and will play under the name Hebar 2011 Pazardzhik.

== Promotion to East B PFG ==
=== North-East V AFG ===
| Pos | Team | Pld | W | D | L | GF | GA | GD | Pts | Promotion or relegation |
|---|---|---|---|---|---|---|---|---|---|---|
| 1 | Shumen 2010 (C, P) | 28 | 19 | 6 | 3 | 69 | 24 | +45 | 63 | Promotion to B Group |
| 2 | Dve Mogili | 28 | 19 | 5 | 4 | 75 | 28 | +47 | 62 | |
| 3 | Suvorovo (Note: Suvorovo and Devnya received a one point deduction, because their match was suspended due to mass brawl between the players of both teams and pitch invasion by the fans.) | 28 | 18 | 6 | 4 | 60 | 23 | +37 | 59 | |
| 4 | Belitsa | 28 | 14 | 8 | 6 | 50 | 24 | +26 | 50 | |
| 5 | Septemvri Tervel | 28 | 13 | 10 | 5 | 45 | 27 | +18 | 49 | |
| 6 | Dunav 2010 Ruse | 28 | 12 | 10 | 6 | 48 | 19 | +29 | 46 | |
| 7 | Chernolomets Popovo | 28 | 12 | 7 | 9 | 46 | 30 | +16 | 43 | |
| 8 | Benkovski Byala | 28 | 13 | 2 | 13 | 52 | 60 | −8 | 41 | |
| 9 | Devnya | 28 | 11 | 7 | 10 | 33 | 38 | −5 | 39 | |
| 10 | Chernomorets Balchik | 28 | 10 | 6 | 12 | 43 | 33 | +10 | 36 | |
| 11 | Chernomorets 2003 Byala | 28 | 8 | 7 | 13 | 41 | 32 | +9 | 31 | |
| 12 | Veliki Preslav | 28 | 7 | 3 | 18 | 24 | 74 | −50 | 24 | |
| 13 | Rapid Divdyadovo (R) | 27 | 6 | 4 | 17 | 33 | 57 | −24 | 22 (Note: Rapid Divdyadovo fused with Shumen 2010 and canceled its further participation on this division. All remaining fixtures are awarded 0-3 against them.) | Relegation to Regional Division |
| 14 | Lokomotiv 2008 Kaspichan | 28 | 4 | 3 | 21 | 19 | 88 | −69 | 15 | |
| 15 | Botev Novi Pazar (R) | 27 | 0 | 2 | 25 | 3 | 84 | −81 | 2 (Note: Botev Novi Pazar decided to cancel their participation in the championship during the winter break due to financial difficulties. All remaining fixtures are awarded 0-3 against them.) | Relegation to Regional Division |

Source: Soccerway
Rules for classification: 1) points; 2) goal difference; 3) number of goals scored.
(C) Champions; (P) Promoted; (R) Relegated

=== South-East V AFG ===
| Pos | Team | Pld | W | D | L | GF | GA | GD | Pts | Promotion or relegation |
|---|---|---|---|---|---|---|---|---|---|---|
| 1 | Rakovski 2011 (C, P) | 34 | 23 | 6 | 5 | 91 | 30 | +61 | 75 | Promotion to B Group |
| 2 | Tundzha Yambol | 34 | 23 | 6 | 5 | 71 | 24 | +47 | 75 | |
| 3 | Botev Galabovo | 34 | 19 | 9 | 6 | 57 | 23 | +34 | 66 | |
| 4 | Svilengrad | 34 | 18 | 11 | 5 | 67 | 29 | +38 | 65 | |
| 5 | Asenovets | 34 | 19 | 6 | 9 | 59 | 54 | +5 | 63 | |
| 6 | Master Burgas | 34 | 17 | 8 | 9 | 45 | 34 | +11 | 59 | |
| 7 | Dimitrovgrad | 34 | 18 | 4 | 12 | 64 | 47 | +17 | 58 | |
| 8 | Sozopol | 34 | 17 | 5 | 12 | 54 | 30 | +24 | 56 | |
| 9 | Brestnik | 34 | 14 | 8 | 12 | 60 | 45 | +15 | 50 | |
| 10 | Zagorets Nova Zagora | 34 | 14 | 4 | 16 | 42 | 40 | +2 | 46 | |
| 11 | Arda Kardzhali | 34 | 13 | 5 | 16 | 42 | 49 | −7 | 44 | |
| 12 | Spartak Plovdiv | 34 | 9 | 10 | 15 | 51 | 57 | −6 | 37 | |
| 13 | Gigant Saedinenie | 34 | 10 | 6 | 18 | 45 | 63 | −18 | 36 | |
| 14 | Levski Karlovo | 34 | 9 | 7 | 18 | 32 | 64 | −32 | 34 | |
| 15 | Rozova Dolina | 34 | 8 | 8 | 18 | 38 | 60 | −22 | 32 | |
| 16 | Hebros Harmanli | 34 | 8 | 6 | 20 | 43 | 58 | −15 | 30 | |
| 17 | Sportist Roza (R) | 34 | 4 | 6 | 24 | 21 | 98 | −77 | 18 | Relegation to Regional Division |
| 18 | Chirpan (Note: Chirpan decided to cancel their participation after Round 31 due to financial difficulties. All remaining fixtures are awarded 0-3 against them.) (R) | 34 | 4 | 3 | 27 | 13 | 89 | −76 | 15 | Relegation to Regional Division |
| – | Rodopa Smolyan (Note: Rodopa Smolyan resigned from participation in the league after round 13, all fixtures were annulled and every opponent will rest if it is the case (according to schedule) that they should play against Rodopa.) (R) | 12 | 1 | 2 | 9 | 7 | 25 | −18 | 5 | Relegation to Regional Division |
| – | Tundzha Yagoda (Note: Tundzha Yagoda resigned from participation in the league after round 9, all fixtures were annulled and every opponent will rest if it is the case (according to schedule) that they should play against Tundzha Yagoda.) (R) | 9 | 0 | 0 | 9 | 3 | 43 | −40 | 0 | Relegation to Regional Division |

Source: Soccerway
Rules for classification: 1) points; 2) goal difference; 3) number of goals scored.
(C) Champions; (P) Promoted; (R) Relegated

== Promotion to West B PFG ==
=== North-West V AFG ===
| Pos | Team | Pld | W | D | L | GF | GA | GD | Pts | Promotion or relegation |
|---|---|---|---|---|---|---|---|---|---|---|
| 1 | Spartak 1919 Pleven (C, P) | 30 | 27 | 2 | 1 | 111 | 10 | +101 | 83 | Promotion to B Group |
| 2 | Lokomotiv Mezdra (Note: Lokomotiv Mezdra received 3 points deduction due unsettled debts to former employees incl. players. On 11 April 2012 a new 3 points deduction were implemented due new unsettled debts to the former player Michael Tawiah.) | 30 | 28 | 1 | 1 | 102 | 21 | +81 | 79 | |
| 3 | Botev Kozloduy | 30 | 19 | 4 | 7 | 78 | 24 | +54 | 61 | |
| 4 | Akademik Svishtov | 30 | 18 | 4 | 8 | 65 | 33 | +32 | 58 | |
| 5 | Dunav Selanovtsi | 30 | 16 | 7 | 7 | 49 | 22 | +27 | 55 | |
| 6 | Torpedo Borovan | 30 | 17 | 4 | 9 | 62 | 43 | +19 | 55 | |
| 7 | Gigant Belene | 30 | 13 | 7 | 10 | 43 | 34 | +9 | 46 | |
| 8 | Cherven Bryag | 30 | 12 | 5 | 13 | 44 | 63 | −19 | 41 | |
| 9 | Lokomotiv Gorna Oryahovitsa | 30 | 10 | 7 | 13 | 34 | 31 | +3 | 37 | |
| 10 | Sitomir Nikopol | 30 | 11 | 3 | 16 | 41 | 79 | −38 | 36 | |
| 11 | Tryavna | 30 | 7 | 8 | 15 | 32 | 60 | −28 | 29 | |
| 12 | Botev Krivodol (Note: Botev Krivodol decided to cancel their participation in the championship during the winter break due to financial difficulties. All remaining fixtures are awarded 0-3 against them.) (R) | 28 | 7 | 2 | 19 | 22 | 54 | −32 | 23 | Relegation to Regional Division |
| 13 | Yantra Gabrovo (Note: Yantra Gabrovo decided to cancel their participation after Round 17 due to financial difficulties. All remaining fixtures are awarded 0-3 against them.) (R) | 29 | 7 | 2 | 20 | 20 | 60 | −40 | 23 | Relegation to Regional Division |
| 14 | Balkan Belogradchik | 30 | 5 | 5 | 20 | 24 | 83 | −59 | 20 | |
| 15 | Levski | 30 | 5 | 2 | 23 | 29 | 85 | −56 | 17 | |
| 16 | Lokomotiv Dryanovo (Note: Lokomotiv Dryanovo decided to cancel their participation in the championship during the winter break due to financial difficulties. All remaining fixtures are awarded 0-3 against them) (R) | 29 | 2 | 5 | 22 | 13 | 68 | −55 | 11 | Relegation to Regional Division |

Source: Soccerway
Rules for classification: 1) points; 2) goal difference; 3) number of goals scored.
(C) Champions; (P) Promoted; (R) Relegated

=== South-West V AFG ===
| Pos | Team | Pld | W | D | L | GF | GA | GD | Pts | Promotion or relegation |
|---|---|---|---|---|---|---|---|---|---|---|
| 1 | Pirin Razlog (C, P) | 36 | 30 | 3 | 3 | 93 | 20 | +73 | 93 | Promotion to B Group |
| 2 | Perun Kresna | 36 | 27 | 8 | 1 | 83 | 20 | +63 | 89 | |
| 3 | Rilski Sportist Samokov | 36 | 21 | 5 | 10 | 66 | 29 | +37 | 68 | |
| 4 | FC Oborishte Panagyurishte | 36 | 20 | 7 | 9 | 76 | 35 | +41 | 67 | |
| 5 | Marek 2010 Dupnitsa | 36 | 18 | 9 | 9 | 62 | 31 | +31 | 63 | |
| 6 | Vitosha Bistritsa | 36 | 19 | 4 | 13 | 53 | 36 | +17 | 61 | |
| 7 | Velbazhd Kyustendil | 36 | 17 | 6 | 13 | 57 | 54 | +3 | 57 | |
| 8 | Germaneya Sapareva Banya | 36 | 14 | 10 | 12 | 50 | 51 | −1 | 52 | |
| 9 | Chepinets Velingrad | 36 | 13 | 10 | 13 | 68 | 50 | +18 | 49 | |
| 10 | Belasitsa Petrich | 36 | 15 | 3 | 18 | 54 | 47 | +7 | 48 | |
| 11 | Mesta Hadzhidimovo | 36 | 13 | 7 | 16 | 51 | 51 | 0 | 46 | |
| 12 | Kostinbrod | 36 | 13 | 7 | 16 | 42 | 50 | −8 | 46 | |
| 13 | Septemvri Sofia | 36 | 12 | 8 | 16 | 38 | 49 | −11 | 44 | |
| 14 | Minyor Bobov Dol | 36 | 12 | 6 | 18 | 45 | 62 | −17 | 42 | |
| 15 | Vitosha Dolna Dikanya | 36 | 13 | 3 | 20 | 48 | 68 | −20 | 42 | |
| 16 | Strumska Slava (R) | 36 | 10 | 6 | 20 | 44 | 63 | −19 | 36 | Relegation to Regional Division |
| 17 | Hebar 2011 Pazardzhik (Note: Hebar 2011 Pazardzhik decided to cancel their participation in the championship during the winter break due to financial difficulties. All remaining fixtures are awarded 0-3 against them.) (R) | 36 | 10 | 4 | 22 | 39 | 76 | −37 | 34 | Relegation to Regional Division |
| 18 | Levski Elin Pelin (R) | 36 | 6 | 5 | 25 | 31 | 85 | −54 | 23 | Relegation to Regional Division |
| 19 | Hebar Pazardzhik (Note: Hebar Pazardzhik have not send their youth team to five consecutive games in the youth championship and received 9 point deduction. The club received also a fine of 2100 Leva.) (R) | 36 | 2 | 3 | 31 | 22 | 145 | −123 | 0 | Relegation to Regional Division |
| – | Balkan Botevgrad (Note: Balkan Botevgrad resigned from participation in the league after round 2, all fixtures were annulled and every opponent will rest if it is the case (according to schedule) that they should play against Balkan.) (R) | 2 | 0 | 0 | 2 | 0 | 13 | −13 | 0 | Relegation to Regional Division |

Source: Soccerway
Rules for classification: 1) points; 2) goal difference; 3) number of goals scored.
(C) Champions; (P) Promoted; (R) Relegated
