= Nikolay Bozhov =

Bulgarian football forward

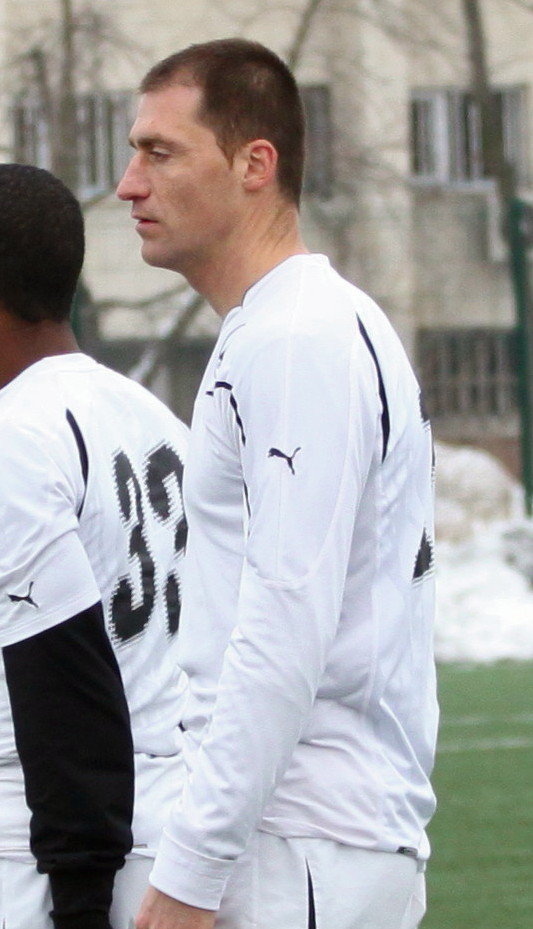

Personal information
- Full name: Nikolay Angelov Bozhov
- Date of birth: 18 July 1977 (age 49)
- Place of birth: Sofia, Bulgaria
- Height: 1.85 m (6 ft 1 in)
- Position: Forward

Youth career
- –1994: Levski Sofia

Senior career*
Years	Team	Apps	(Gls)
2005–2007	Vihar Gorublyane	?	(?)
2007–2010	Akademik Sofia	66	(29)
2010–2012	Slavia Sofia	48	(16)
2012	Hamrun Spartans	11	(1)
2013–?	Vitosha Bistritsa	34	(14)
- * Club domestic league appearances and goals

Nikolay Bozhov (Bulgarian: Николай Божов; born 18 July 1977) is a Bulgarian former footballer who played as a forward.

== Youth retirement and business ==
Bozhov was born in Sofia. He started his youth career in Bulgarian powerhouse Levski Sofia's academy. At the age of 17, he retired from football because of a waist injury. Bozhov's father died soon after Bozhov finished his compulsory military service, so he had to take charge of his father's ironmonger's shop. The business quickly developed and the shop soon grew to a full-fledged enterprise. Bozhov imported goods from China and supplied local wholesale dealers. At the time, Bozhov did not even consider a return to football, as his business provided a good source of income and his waist problems continued.

== Senior career ==
In 2005, on the insistence of a friend, Bozhov started appearing for amateur side Vihar Gorublyane, returning to football after a ten-year break. He played for the team for two seasons in the lower divisions of Bulgaria's football pyramid. While a part-time player at Vihar, Bozhov did not receive any salary. In 2007, the club merged with B PFG side Akademik Sofia, and thus Bozhov indirectly became a part of that team.

=== Akademik Sofia ===
In June 2007, at 30, Bozhov signed his first professional contract with Akademik Sofia. Nonetheless, he was not a full-time footballer for the club and would sometimes attend training as rarely as once or twice a week. He made his debut on 18 August 2007, during the 2007–08 season, in a 1–1 away draw against Yantra Gabrovo, coming on as a substitute for Troyan Radulov. In the next week he scored his first goal for a 2–1 away win against Velbazhd Kyustendil. In his first season as a professional footballer, Bozhov made 18 appearances in the B PFG and scored six goals.

During the following 2008–09 campaign, the Akademik manager decided to use Bozhov in the starting line-up as the team's main striker. In that season, Bozhov scored eight goals in 24 appearances.

The 2009–10 season saw Bozhov emerge as the top scorer of Akademik Sofia with 15 goals in 24 games. His goals helped the team gain promotion to the first division in Bulgaria, for the first time in 28 years. On 23 May 2010, Bozhov scored two goals in the A PFG promotion play-off against Nesebar and was voted Akademik's best player of the 2009–10 season.

=== Slavia Sofia ===
In late May 2010, Bozhov joined Slavia Sofia on a free transfer, agreeing a one-year deal with the A PFG club. Among the reasons for Bozhov's choice to sign for Slavia was the negative effect of the 2008 financial crisis on his business, which ceased to be profitable. While he was still running the enterprise and paying the salaries of his three employees, he could afford to train daily and attend pre-season camps outside Sofia.

He began the season in fine form for Slavia. On 7 August 2010, while 33 years old, he made his debut in the Bulgarian top division. Bozhov scored his first competitive Slavia goal 12 minutes into his debut, in the game against Minyor Pernik. In Slavia's fourth game of the season against Pirin Blagoevgrad, Bozhov scored twice. He also featured in the next game, at home against Lokomotiv Plovdiv, when he scored his fourth goal of the A PFG season. On 11 September 2010, Bozhov continued to impress with two goals in a 4–0 win against his previous team Akademik Sofia. Bozhov was at one point sharing 5th place among the top scorers in the A PFG. On 7 April 2011, Bozhov netted twice (including a last-minute goal with a scissor kick to send the game into extra time) in the 4:4 draw with Chernomorets Burgas in the quarter finals of the Bulgarian Cup. He also converted his penalty kick into the eventual shootout to decide the game, which was won by Slavia. Bozhov featured less regularly during the 2011/2012 season and was released from Slavia in late April 2012.

== Career statistics ==
As of 31 May 2012

Club	Season	League		Cup		Total	
Club	Season	Apps	Goals	Apps	Goals	Apps	Goals
Akademik	2007–08	18	6	1	0	19	6
Akademik	2008–09	24	8	0	0	24	8
Akademik	2009–10	24	15	2	2	26	17
Akademik	TOTAL	66	29	3	2	69	31
Slavia	2010–11	27	10	4	4	30	14
Slavia	2011–12	21	6	0	0	21	6
Slavia	TOTAL	48	16	4	4	52	20
Career totals		114	45	7	6	121	51
