= 2010–11 V AFG =

Bulgarian V AFG
- Season: 2010–11

The 2010–11 V AFG season was the 62nd season of the Bulgarian V AFG, the third tier of the Bulgarian football league system. The season started on 15 August 2010 and finished in May 2011. The group comprised four regional divisions with a different number of teams. Only the champion of each division was promoted to the B Group 2011/12.

== Changes from the 2009–10 season ==
=== Movement between B PFG and V AFG ===
The champions of the four 2009–10 V AFG divisions were promoted to the 2010–11 B PFG: Dorostol Silistra from V AFG North-East and Ravda from V AFG South-East promoted to the B PFG East, Chavdar Byala Slatina from V AFG North-West and Malesh Mikrevo from V AFG South-West ascended to the B PFG West.

In return, Rodopa Smolyan, Belite Orli Pleven and Bdin Vidin were relegated from both 2009-10 B PFG groups. Rodopa and Belite Orli even did not receive a license for V AFG, so they will play in the regional divisions this season.

=== Movement from V Group to fourth-level leagues ===
The club of Aksakovo was relegated from the North-Eastern V AFG after the end of the season. The clubs of Ariston Ruse and Endzhe Tsari Brod were also relegated from this division, but because they resigned their participation during the season. In North-East V AFG promotion achieved the teams from Kubrat and Devnya. The team of F.C. Spartak Varna took the license of FC Topolite (the 16th-placed team in North-East division). Due to the huge similarity with the name of PFC Spartak Varna, the Regional football committee registered the new team under the name FC Topolite. Spartak Varna and Volov Shumen lost their professional license and went to play in this division. Volov Shumen unites with the team of Makak from Shumen Regional division, and the new team will be called Makak Shumen. On 27 July the executive committee of BFU decided that Razgrad will take the place of the bankrupted team of AKB Minyor in East B PFG.

In South-East V AFG there were also a lot of changes. Botev Plovdiv and Svilengrad lost their professional license and joined the South-East V AFG. Botev Plovdiv even was abolished as a team, but resurfaced after the new founding of the club and using the spot and license for Metalik Sopot. Strandzha-Metalurg Sredets decided to cancel their participation, so their spot was taken by the team of Rodopa Smolyan (the team lost their professional license from last season). The team of Levski Stara Zagora renamed themselves Tundzha Yagoda, but will play their home games at the Lokomotiv Stadium in Stara Zagora. From that division relegated Haskovo and Kosmos Burgas resigned from participation before the start of the last season. Asenovets and Chirpan promoted form the regional divisions.

North-West V AFG was joined by Lokomotiv Mezdra from A PFG and Bdin Vidin from B PFG. The teams of Pavlikeni and Belite orli decided to cancel their participation for this season. Samovodene and the re-emerged team of Spartak Pleven joined this division from the fourth level.

The South-West division was joined by Balkan Botevgrad and Rilski Sportist Samokov from B PFG. Later Rilski Sportist and Marek Dupnitsa were not granted a license for the South-West division. The team of Belasitsa Petrich decided to cancel their participation for this season. From the regional divisions came up the teams of Septemvri Sofia, Lokomotiv Septemvri and Avangard Bachevo, but on 12 August 2010 the zonal committee decided not to grant Avangard a license for participation in the South-West division. After the team of Avangard objected this ruling, they received the license.

== Promotion to East B PFG ==
=== North-East V AFG ===
Pos	Team	Pld	W	D	L	GF	GA	GD	Pts	Promotion or relegation
1	Spartak Varna (C, P)	30	25	1	4	91	20	+71	76	Promotion to B Group
2	Septemvri Tervel	30	20	2	8	54	27	+27	62	
3	Dve Mogili	30	18	5	7	58	29	+29	59	
4	Makak Shumen	30	16	8	6	65	31	+34	56	
5	Suvorovo	30	17	4	9	45	24	+21	55	
6	Rapid Divdyadovo	30	13	5	12	39	40	−1	44	
7	Chernomorets Byala	30	13	4	13	49	50	−1	43	
8	Belitsa	30	13	1	16	43	42	+1	40	
9	Chernolomets Popovo	30	11	5	14	42	45	−3	38	
10	Skrita Sila Mudrevo (Note: Skrita sila Madrevo decided to cancel their participation after the end of the season.) (R)	30	11	5	14	51	58	−7	38	Relegation to Regional Division
11	Benkovski Byala	30	10	7	13	58	58	0	37	
12	Topolite (Note: Topolite resigned from participation during the winter break on 9 February 2011. Until the end of the championship, its opponents will be awarded with 3:0 wins.) (R)	29	10	2	17	34	54	−20	32	Relegation to Regional Division
13	Preslav	30	8	6	16	26	54	−28	30	
14	Devnya	30	5	10	15	21	52	−31	25	
15	Shabla (Note: Shabla resigned from participation during the winter break on 11 February 2011. Until the end of the championship, its opponents will be awarded with 3:0 wins.) (R)	29	7	4	18	23	59	−36	25	Relegation to Regional Division
16	Botev Novi Pazar	30	5	5	20	19	75	−56	20	
–	Sportist (Note: Sportist resigned from participation in the league after round 10, all fixtures were annulled and every opponent will rest if it is the case (according to schedule) that they should play against Sportist.) (R)	10	1	2	7	6	31	−25	5	Relegation to Regional Division
–	Kubrat (Note: Kubrat resigned from participation in the league after round 9, all fixtures were annulled and every opponent will rest if it is the case (according to schedule) that they should play against Kubrat.) (R)	9	0	3	6	5	28	−23	3	Relegation to Regional Division

Source: Soccerway
Rules for classification: 1) points; 2) goal difference; 3) number of goals scored.
(C) Champions; (P) Promoted; (R) Relegated

=== South-East V AFG ===
Pos	Team	Pld	W	D	L	GF	GA	GD	Pts	Promotion or relegation
1	Botev Plovdiv (C, P)	38	37	1	0	127	15	+112	112	Promotion to B Group
2	Neftochimik (P)	38	25	6	7	100	31	+69	81	Promotion to B Group
3	Zagorets Nova Zagora	38	23	9	6	69	37	+32	78	
4	Sozopol	38	22	5	11	89	31	+58	71	
5	Gigant	38	21	7	10	66	45	+21	70	
6	Botev Galabovo	38	19	9	10	68	39	+29	66	
7	Dimitrovgrad	38	17	10	11	67	42	+25	61	
8	Svilengrad	38	19	4	15	70	66	+4	61	
9	Maritsa Plovdiv	38	16	10	12	77	55	+22	58	
10	Hebros Harmanli	38	16	6	16	61	49	+12	54	
11	Arda Kardzhali	38	17	3	18	71	59	+12	54	
12	Tundzha Yagoda (Note: Tundzha Yagoda didn't show up for their match against Asenovets, so they received an 0:3 loss and 3 points deduction.)	38	17	2	19	67	86	−19	50	
13	Asenovets	38	13	10	15	58	63	−5	49	
14	Rozova Dolina	38	13	6	19	49	58	−9	45	
15	Rodopa Smolyan (Note: Rodopa didn't show up for their match against Gabrovnitza Gorno Strahane, so they received an 0:3 loss and 3 points deduction.)	38	14	5	19	63	72	−9	44	
16	Levski Karlovo	38	12	7	19	39	71	−32	43	
17	Chirpan	38	10	2	26	36	90	−54	32	
18	Tundzha Yambol	38	9	3	26	43	106	−63	30	
19	Gabrovnitsa Gorno Strahane (R)	38	3	2	33	19	136	−117	11	Relegation to Regional Division
20	Stambolovo (Note: Stambolovo resigned from participation during the winter break on 1 March 2011. Until the end of the championship, its opponents will be awarded with 3:0 wins. They were also banned with 3 points deduction.) (R)	38	3	1	34	16	104	−88	7	Relegation to Regional Division

Source: Soccerway
Rules for classification: 1) points; 2) goal difference; 3) number of goals scored.
(C) Champions; (P) Promoted; (R) Relegated

== Promotion to West B PFG ==
=== North-West V AFG ===
Pos	Team	Pld	W	D	L	GF	GA	GD	Pts	Promotion or relegation
1	Bdin Vidin (C, P)	30	23	5	2	82	17	+65	74	Promotion to B Group
2	Botev Kozloduy	30	19	4	7	57	16	+41	61	
3	Lokomotiv Mezdra	30	17	7	6	53	24	+29	58	
4	Yantra Gabrovo	30	16	5	9	57	34	+23	53	
5	Spartak 1919 Pleven	30	15	6	9	49	27	+22	51	
6	Samovodene (Note: Samovodene decided to cancel their participation after the end of the season.) (R)	30	14	8	8	57	25	+32	50	Relegation to Regional Division
7	Akademik Svishtov	30	13	9	8	52	29	+23	48	
8	Tryavna	30	13	6	11	42	37	+5	45	
9	Sitomir Nikopol	30	12	5	13	39	53	−14	41	
10	Torpedo Borovan	30	10	5	15	39	35	+4	35	
11	Balkan Belogradchik	30	9	4	17	40	65	−25	31	
12	FC Lokomotiv Gorna Oryahovitsa	30	7	8	15	28	42	−14	29	
13	Botev Dimovo (Note: Botev Dimovo decided to cancel their participation on April 27, 2011 in the competition due financial difficulties. Until the end of the season its opponents will receive a 3:0 awarded win. They received also 3 points deduction because they did not show up for their last match.) (R)	30	10	2	18	25	58	−33	29	Relegation to Regional Division
14	Gigant Belene	30	8	2	20	25	70	−45	26	
15	Lokomotiv Dryanovo	30	6	5	19	17	76	−59	23	
16	Levski	30	7	1	22	24	78	−54	22	

Source: Soccerway
Rules for classification: 1) points; 2) goal difference; 3) number of goals scored.
(C) Champions; (P) Promoted; (R) Relegated

=== South-West V AFG ===
Pos	Team	Pld	W	D	L	GF	GA	GD	Pts	Promotion or relegation
1	Slivnishki Geroi (C, P)	38	29	6	3	108	24	+84	93	Promotion to B Group
2	Pirin Razlog	38	26	7	5	89	28	+61	85	
3	Vitosha Bistritsa	38	27	4	7	70	24	+46	85	
4	Perun Kresna	38	24	7	7	89	31	+58	79	
5	Mesta Hadzhidimovo	38	20	9	9	71	38	+33	69	
6	Kostinbrod	38	18	7	13	82	46	+36	61	
7	Lokomotiv Septemvri	38	17	8	13	75	55	+20	59	
8	Balkan Botevgrad	38	16	8	14	61	51	+10	56	
9	Septemvri Sofia	38	15	11	12	59	54	+5	56	
10	Velbazhd	38	16	6	16	73	59	+14	54	
11	Minyor Bobov Dol	38	16	6	16	62	58	+4	54	
12	Vitosha Dolna Dikanya	38	16	5	17	58	53	+5	53	
13	Benkovski Pazardzhik (Note: Benkovski Pazardzhik decided to cancel their participation after the end of the season.) (R)	38	13	9	16	57	57	0	48	Relegation to Regional Division
14	Strumska slava	38	14	5	19	56	78	−22	47	
15	Chepinets Velingrad	38	13	3	22	49	75	−26	42	
16	Germanea	38	11	6	21	39	58	−19	39	
17	Levski Elin Pelin	38	11	3	24	52	100	−48	36	
18	Hebar Pazardzhik	38	10	2	26	54	93	−39	32	
19	Botev Ihtiman (R)	38	4	5	29	21	134	−113	17	Relegation to Regional Division
20	Avangard Bachevo (R)	38	4	3	31	38	147	−109	15	Relegation to Regional Division

Source: Soccerway
Rules for classification: 1) points; 2) goal difference; 3) number of goals scored.
(C) Champions; (P) Promoted; (R) Relegated
