= 2009–10 B Group =

Bulgarian B Group
- Season: 2009–10
- Teams: 32
- Champions: Vidima-Rakovski (West); Kaliakra (East)
- Promoted: Vidima-Rakovski; Kaliakra; Akademik Sofia
- Relegated: Balkan; Marek; Rilski Sportist; Bdin Vidin; Belite Orli Pleven; Spartak Varna; Panayot Volov; Svilengrad; Minyor Radnevo; Rodopa
- Matches: 450
- Goals: 1,119 (2.49 per match)

The 2009–10 B Group was the 54th season of the Bulgarian B Football Group, the second tier of the Bulgarian football league system. The season started on 8 August 2009 and finished on 23 May 2010 with the A Group promotion play-off between the runners-up from both divisions.

== East B Group ==
=== Teams ===
Team^{1}	City	Stadium	Capacity	Notes
AKB Minyor Radnevo	Radnevo	Minyor Stadium	3,455	10th in 2008-09
Brestnik 1948	Brestnik	Brestnik Stadium	7,000	Promoted from Third Division - South East
Chernomorets Balchik	Balchik	Balchik Stadium	2,500	13th in 2008-09
Chernomorets Pomorie	Pomorie	Pomorie Stadium	3,000	2nd in 2008-09
Dobrudzha Dobrich	Dobrich	Druzhba Stadium	12,500	Promoted from Third Division - North East
Dunav Rousse	Rousse	Gradski Stadium	22,000	5th in 2008-09
Kaliakra Kavarna	Kavarna	Kavarna Stadium	5,000	3rd in 2008-09
Lyubimetz 2007	Lyubimets	Lyubimetz Stadium	5,000	7th in 2008-09
Nesebar	Nesebar	Nesebar Stadium	10,000	6th in 2008-09
PFC Panayot Volov	Shumen	Panayot Volov Stadium	24,390	14th in 2008-09
PFC Svetkavitsa	Targovishte	Svetkavitsa Stadium	7,000	8th in 2008-09
Rodopa	Smolyan	Septemvri Stadium	6,100	12th in 2008-09
Spartak Varna	Varna	Spartak Stadium	12,000	Relegated from First Division
Spartak Plovdiv	Plovdiv	Todor Diev Stadium	3,548	4th in 2008-09
Svilengrad 1921	Svilengrad	Kolodruma Stadium	6,536	9th in 2008-09

^{1}Only 15 teams will compete in the East B PFG this season due to no team from the Bulgarian North-East V AFG being promoted. Both the champions FC Orlovets Pobeda and runners-up FC Benkovski Bjala refused to participate in the Second Division and chose instead to continue to compete in the Third Division.

=== Final standings ===
Pos	Team	Pld	W	D	L	GF	GA	GD	Pts	Promotion or relegation
1	Kaliakra Kavarna (P)	28	17	6	5	44	20	+24	57	Promotion to 2010–11 A Group
2	Nesebar	28	17	6	5	56	24	+32	57	Qualification for Promotion play-off
3	Dunav Ruse	28	16	6	6	48	29	+19	54	
4	Spartak Plovdiv	28	13	8	7	36	24	+12	47	
5	Lyubimets 2007	28	12	9	7	39	24	+15	45	
6	Brestnik	28	13	6	9	42	29	+13	45	
7	Chernomorets Pomorie	28	13	4	11	45	36	+9	43	
8	Chernomorets Balchik	28	12	6	10	37	30	+7	42	
9	Spartak Varna (R)	28	11	4	13	33	41	−8	37 (Note: The team did not receive a license for professional football for the next season.)	Relegation to 2010–11 V Group
10	PFC Panayot Volov (R)	28	9	6	13	37	39	−2	33	Relegation to 2010–11 V Group
11	PFC Svetkavitsa	28	8	8	12	28	31	−3	32	
12	Svilengrad 1921 (R)	28	10	1	17	36	58	−22	31	Relegation to 2010–11 V Group
13	Dobrudzha Dobrich	28	8	6	14	27	39	−12	30	
14	AKB Minyor Radnevo (R)	28	8	6	14	34	46	−12	30	Relegation to 2010–11 V Group
–	Rodopa Smolyan (R)	28	1	2	25	6	78	−72	5 (Note: Rodopa were excluded from the league during the winter break, all remaining fixtures are awarded 0-3 against them.)	Relegation to 2010–11 V Group

Source: BFU
Rules for classification: 1) points; 2) goal difference; 3) number of goals scored.
(P) Promoted; (R) Relegated

=== Top goalscorers ===
Rank	Scorer	Club	Goals
1	(Bulgaria) Borislav Ivanov	Nesebar	12
2	(Bulgaria) Emil Todorov	Chernomorets Balchik	8
2	(Bulgaria) Martin Stefanov	Nesebar	8
2	(Bulgaria) Todor Hristov	Nesebar	8
5	(Bulgaria) Aleksandar Stoychev	Brestnik 1948	7
5	(Bulgaria) Ivan Petkov	Kaliakra Kavarna	7
7	(Bulgaria) Emil Petkov	Lyubimetz	6

== West B Group ==
=== Teams ===
Team	City	Stadium	Capacity	Notes
Akademik Sofia	Sofia	Stadium "Akademik"	18,000	8th in 2008-09
Balkan Botevgrad	Botevgrad	Hirsto Botev Stadium	8,000	5th in 2008-09
Bansko	Bansko	St. Petar Stadium	3,000	3rd in 2008-09
Belite Orli Pleven	Pleven	Belite Orli Stadium	15,000	5th in 2008-09
Botev Krivodol	Krivodol	Hristo Botev Stadium	3,000	10th in 2008-09
Botev Vratsa	Vratsa	Hristo Botev Stadium	32,000	Promoted from Third Division - North West
Chavdar Etropole	Etropole	Chavdar Stadium	5,000	4th in 2008-09
Etar Veliko Tarnovo	Tarnovo	Ivaylo Stadium	18,000	13th in 2008-09
FC Bdin Vidin	Vidin	Georgi Benkovski Stadium	15,000	Promoted from Third Division - North West
Kom-Minyor	Berkovitza	Gradski Stadium	6,000	11th in 2008-09
Marek Dupnitsa	Dupnitsa	Bonchuk Stadium	16,050	14th in 2008-09
Pirin Gotse Delchev	Gotse Delchev	Gradski Stadium	8,000	9th in 2008-09
Rilski Sportist Samokov	Samokov	Iskar Stadium	5,000	6th in 2008-09
Septemvri Simitli	Simitli	Struma Stadium	8,000	Promoted from Third Division - South West
Vidima-Rakovski Sevlievo	Sevlievo	Rakovski Stadium	8,816	7th in 2008-09
Vihren Sandanski	Sandanski	Sandanski Stadium	6,000	Relegated from First Division

=== Final standings ===
Pos	Team	Pld	W	D	L	GF	GA	GD	Pts	Promotion or relegation
1	Vidima-Rakovski (P)	30	19	3	8	53	32	+21	60	Promotion to 2010–11 A Group
2	Akademik Sofia (P)	30	18	5	7	49	37	+12	59	Qualification for Promotion play-off
3	Bansko	30	17	8	5	50	22	+28	59	
4	Vihren Sandanski	30	16	8	6	45	24	+21	56	
5	Etar Veliko Tarnovo	30	13	8	9	47	38	+9	47	
6	Botev Vratsa	30	11	12	7	39	26	+13	45	
7	Septemvri Simitli	30	13	4	13	40	34	+6	43	
8	Chavdar Etropole	30	12	7	11	34	32	+2	43	
9	Balkan Botevgrad (R)	30	9	14	7	35	28	+7	41 (Note: The team did not receive a license for professional football for the next season.)	Relegation to 2010–11 V Group
10	Marek Dupnitsa (R)	30	12	5	13	35	36	−1	41	Relegation to 2010–11 V Group
11	Pirin Gotse Delchev	30	11	7	12	35	38	−3	40	
12	Kom-Minyor	30	10	8	12	36	43	−7	38	
13	Botev Krivodol	30	8	7	15	21	40	−19	31	
14	Rilski Sportist Samokov (R)	30	8	6	16	32	49	−17	30	Relegation to 2010–11 V Group
15	FC Bdin Vidin (R)	30	4	8	18	24	47	−23	20	Relegation to 2010–11 V Group
–	Belite Orli Pleven (R)	30	2	4	24	20	69	−49	10 (Note: Belite Orli Pleven were excluded from the league during the winter break, all remaining fixtures are awarded 0-3 against them.)	Relegation to 2010–11 V Group

Source: BFU
Rules for classification: 1) points; 2) goal difference; 3) number of goals scored.
(P) Promoted; (R) Relegated

=== Top goalscorers ===
Rank	Scorer	Club	Goals
1	(Bulgaria) Veselin Stoykov	Bansko	15
1	(Bulgaria) Rumen Rangelov	Botev Vratsa	15
3	(Bulgaria) Angel Rusev	Vidima	10
4	(Bulgaria) Ivan Redovski	Balkan	9
4	(Bulgaria) Todorov	Bdin	9
4	(Bulgaria) Vladislav Zlatinov	Bansko	9
7	(Bulgaria) Asparuh Vasilev	Akademik Sofia	8
7	(Bulgaria) Valentin Valentinov	Marek	8
9	(Bulgaria) Daniel Genov	Kom-Minyor	7
9	(Bulgaria) Angel Toshev	Pirin GD	7

== Promotion play-off ==
23 May 2010

Nesebar	1–2	Akademik Sofia
Ivanov 24'	Report	Bozhov 20', 26' (pen.)

Beroe Stadium, Stara Zagora
Attendance: 300
Referee: Stefan Spasov, Pernik
