= Loudias, Thessaloniki =

Loudias Λουδίας
- Settlement
- Location within Greece
- Coordinates: 40°40.7′N 22°32.5′E
- Country: Greece
- Administrative region: Central Macedonia
- Regional unit: Thessaloniki
- Municipality: Chalkidona
- Municipal unit: Chalkidona
- Community: Mikro Monastiri
- Elevation: 5 m (16 ft)

Population (2021)
  - Total: 665
- Time zone: UTC+2 (EET)
  - Summer (DST): UTC+3 (EEST)
- Postal code: 570 07
- Area code: +30-2391
- Vehicle registration: NA to NX

Loudias (Greek: Λουδίας) is a village of the Chalkidona municipality. Before the 1997 local government reform it was part of the community of Mikro Monastiri. The 2021 census recorded 665 inhabitants in the village.

Its name is derived from the river of the same name that passes through it.

== See also ==
- List of settlements in the Thessaloniki regional unit
