= Petar Kolev (footballer, born 1984) =

Bulgarian footballer

Personal information
- Full name: Petar Todorov Kolev
- Date of birth: 26 June 1984 (age 42)
- Place of birth: Burgas, Bulgaria
- Height: 1.73 m (5 ft 8 in)
- Position: Forward

Team information
- Current team: Karnobat

Youth career
- Chernomorets Burgas

Senior career*
Years	Team	Apps	(Gls)
2002–2004	Chernomorets Burgas	51	(13)
2004–2006	Slavia Sofia	28	(1)
2006–2008	Nesebar	51	(18)
2008	Sliven 2000	5	(0)
2009	Naftex Burgas	10	(8)
2009	Chernomorets Pomorie	7	(1)
2010	Ravda 1954	10	(6)
2011	Nesebar	12	(3)
2011–2012	Neftochimic Burgas	26	(4)
2013–2014	PFC Burgas	30	(18)
2015	Sozopol	11	(0)
2016–	Karnobat	10	(12)
- * Club domestic league appearances and goals as of 21 April 2016

Petar Kolev (Bulgarian: Петър Колев; born 26 June 1984) is a Bulgarian football player. He is a striker. He has played for Chernomorets Pomorie and Ravda. In 2017, he played for Karnobat. He is a graduate of the Chernomorets academy.
