= 2011–12 B Group =

Bulgarian B Group
- Season: 2011–12
- Champions: Pirin Gotse Delchev (West); Etar 1924 (East)
- Promoted: Pirin Gotse Delchev; Etar 1924; Botev Plovdiv
- Relegated: Akademik Sofia; Slivnishki Geroy; Malesh; Chavdar Byala Slatina; Chernomorets Pomorie; Dobrudzha; Nesebar; Dorostol
- Matches: 270
- Goals: 625 (2.31 per match)

The 2011–12 B Group was the 56th season of the Bulgarian B Football Group, the second tier of the Bulgarian football league system. The season started on 13 August 2011 and finished in June 2012 with the A Group promotion play-off.

On 9 June the Executive Committee of Bulgarian Football Union decided to reduce further the number of teams in both West and East B PFG due licensing problems in most of the clubs. The new format consisted of ten teams in each group playing three times against all the others during the season. There were no draws for the matches between fixture 19 and fixture 27. The program was issued depending the position of each club after the completion of fixture 18.

Like in the previous season, the A Group promotion play-off was played in two stages. The first was the match between the runners-up from the West and East B PFG. The final stage was played between the 14th finished team from A Group and the winner from the first stage.

== Team changes from 2010–11 ==
=== Movement between A PFG and B PFG ===
The champions of the two groups of B PFG were promoted to A PFG. These were Botev (Vratsa) (West B PFG champions) and Ludogorets Razgrad (East B PFG champions). The third promoted team is Svetkavitsa, which won the promotion play-off against Etar (Veliko Tarnovo).

Akademik (Sofia) and Sliven were directly relegated from A PFG after finishing in the bottom two places. The team that finished 14th in A PFG - Vidima-Rakovski (Sevlievo) lost the promotion/relegation play-off against Chernomorets (Pomorie), but Chernomorets did not receive a license for A PFG, so Vidima-Rakovski retained its place. The third relegated team is Pirin (Blagoevgrad), finished 13th, because it filed bankruptcy. Pirin did not even receive license for B PFG, so the team will participate in V AFG.

=== Movement between B PFG and V AFG ===
In different stages Chernomorets (Balchik), Dunav (Ruse) and Ravda decided to cancel their participation in the East B PFG and were relegated from the group. Additionally the teams of Spartak (Plovdiv) and Brestnik 1948 (Plovdiv) declared not being ready to fulfill the license regulations and voluntarily were relegated to V AFG. In place of those five teams came the third league champions Botev (Plovdiv) (South-East), Spartak (Varna) (North-East) and the winner of the promotion play-off Neftochimic 1986 (Burgas). Further the team of Etar (Veliko Tarnovo) was moved from West to East B PFG so that the league had ten participating teams.

The situation in the West B PFG was much more clearer. Kom-Minyor left the competition during the winter break due financial difficulties, Botev (Krivodol) was relegated after finishing in 11th place and Vihren (Sandanski) voluntarily left after the end of the season. Those teams were replaced with the V AFG champions - Slivnishki Geroi (Slivnitsa) (South-West) and Bdin (Vidin) (North-West).

== East B Group ==
=== Stadia and locations ===
Location of teams in East B Group 2011-12

Team	City	Stadium	Capacity
Botev	Plovdiv	Hristo Botev	22,000
Chernomorets	Pomorie	Pomorie	3,000
Dobrudzha	Dobrich	Druzhba	12,500
Dorostol	Silistra	Louis Ayer	12,000
Etar	Veliko Tarnovo	Ivaylo	18,000
Lyubimetz 2007	Lyubimets	Lyubimetz	5,000
Neftochimic	Burgas	Lazur	18,037
Nesebar	Nesebar	Nesebar	10,000
Spartak	Varna	Spartak	13,000
Sliven 2000	Sliven	Hadzhi Dimitar	10,000

=== League table ===
Pos	Team	Pld	W	D	L	GF	GA	GD	Pts	Promotion or relegation
1	Etar 1924 (P)	27	15	8	4	31	14	+17	53	Promotion to 2012–13 A Group
2	Botev Plovdiv (P)	27	14	9	4	40	17	+23	51	Qualification for Promotion play-off
3	Neftochimic 1986 Burgas	27	14	7	6	46	29	+17	49	
4	Lyubimets	27	14	6	7	42	22	+20	48	
5	Chernomorets Pomorie (R)	27	10	7	10	38	29	+9	37	Relegation to 2012–13 V Group
6	Sliven 2000	27	10	6	11	29	23	+6	36	
7	Spartak Varna	27	10	6	11	27	35	−8	36	
8	Dobrudzha Dobrich (R)	27	8	8	11	22	28	−6	32	Relegation to 2012–13 V Group
9	Nesebar (R)	27	7	5	15	24	44	−20	26	Relegation to 2012–13 V Group
10	Dorostol Silistra (Note: Dorostol Silistra canceled their participation in the championship during the winter break due to financial difficulties. All remaining fixtures were awarded 0-3 against them.) (R)	27	1	2	24	6	66	−60	2	Relegation to 2012–13 V Group

Source: Soccerway
Rules for classification: 1) points; 2) goal difference; 3) number of goals scored.
(P) Promoted; (R) Relegated

== West B Group ==
=== Stadia and locations ===
Location of teams in West B Group 2011-12

Team	City	Stadium	Capacity
Akademik	Sofia	Akademik	10,000
Bansko	Bansko	Saint Peter	3,000
Bdin	Vidin	Georgi Benkovski	15,000
Chavdar	Byala Slatina	Chavdar	3,000
Chavdar	Etropole	Chavdar	5,000
Malesh	Mikrevo	Malesh	1,500
Pirin	Gotse Delchev	Gradski	8,000
Septemvri	Simitli	Struma	8,000
Slivnishki geroi	Slivnitsa	Slivnishki geroi	10,000
Sportist	Svoge	Chavdar Tsvetkov	5,500

=== League table ===
Pos	Team	Pld	W	D	L	GF	GA	GD	Pts	Promotion or relegation
1	Pirin Gotse Delchev (P)	27	19	5	3	41	12	+29	62	Promotion to 2012–13 A Group
2	Sportist Svoge	27	17	5	5	44	23	+21	56	Qualification for Promotion play-off
3	Bdin Vidin	27	15	6	6	42	20	+22	51	
4	Bansko	27	10	10	7	36	24	+12	40	
5	Chavdar Etropole	27	10	9	8	36	33	+3	39	
6	Septemvri Simitli	27	8	10	9	35	33	+2	34	
7	Akademik Sofia (R)	27	9	4	14	25	33	−8	31	Relegation to 2012–13 V Group
8	Slivnishki Geroi (R)	27	7	4	16	28	48	−20	25	Relegation to 2012–13 V Group
9	Malesh Mikrevo (R)	27	6	4	17	19	38	−19	22	Relegation to 2012–13 V Group
10	Chavdar Byala Slatina (Note: Chavdar Byala Slatina decided to cancel their participation in the championship during the winter break due to financial difficulties. All remaining fixtures are awarded 0-3 against them.) (R)	27	4	3	20	14	56	−42	12	Relegation to 2012–13 V Group

Source: Soccerway
Rules for classification: 1) points; 2) goal difference; 3) number of goals scored.
(P) Promoted; (R) Relegated

== Promotion play-off ==
30 May 2012
17:00 EEST

Sportist Svoge	0–2	Botev Plovdiv
	Report	Rahov 22'; Aleksandrov 43'

Ovcha Kupel, Sofia
Attendance: 8,000
Referee: Stefan Spasov (Sofia)
