= Doka Madureira =

Brazilian footballer (born 1984)

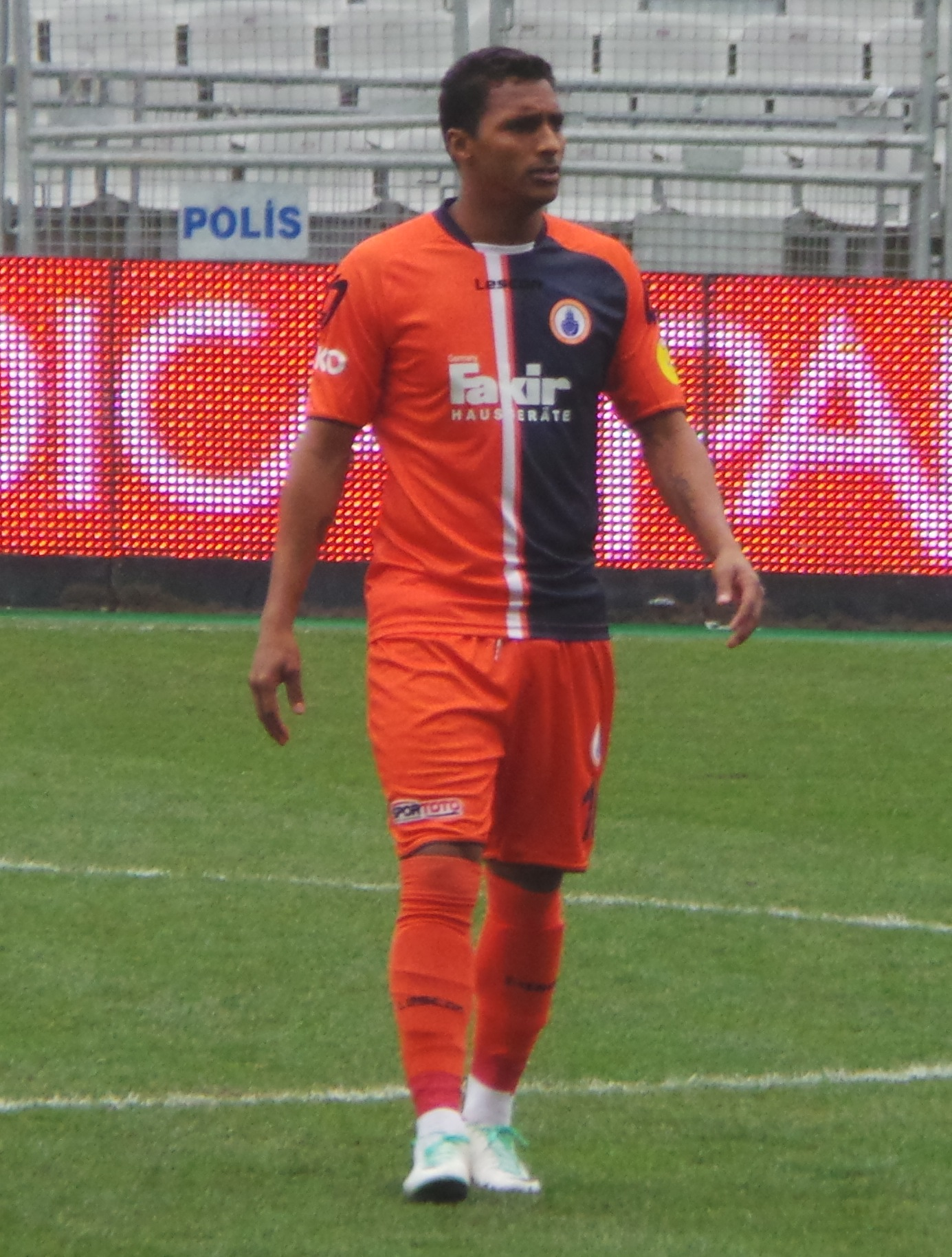

Personal information
- Full name: Francisco Lima da Silva
- Date of birth: 11 February 1984 (age 42)
- Place of birth: Sena Madureira, Brazil
- Height: 1.78 m (5 ft 10 in)
- Position: Winger

Team information
- Current team: Sena Madureira U20 (head coach)

Senior career*
Years	Team	Apps	(Gls)
2003–2008	Rio Branco-AC		
2004–2005	→ Vitória (loan)		
2007	→ Goiás (loan)	3	(0)
2008–2011	Litex Lovech	62	(24)
2011–2017	İstanbul Başakşehir	154	(39)
2017	Ankaragücü	11	(0)
2019	Rio Branco-AC	2	(1)
2019	Atlético Acreano	3	(0)

Managerial career
- 2023–: Sena Madureira U20
- * Club domestic league appearances and goals

Francisco Lima da Silva (born 11 February 1984), commonly known as Doka Madureira or Doka, is a Brazilian football coach and former player who played as a winger. He is the current head coach of the under-20 team of Sena Madureira.

== Career ==
=== Early years ===
Born in Sena Madureira, Acre, Doka spent the first five years of his career in with local Rio Branco, later moving to Bahia and Goiás. He was invited by Serbian FK Partizan for a trial period which began in June 2007, but nothing came of it and he subsequently returning to Rio Branco.

=== Litex Lovech ===
In November 2008 he was invited by Bulgarian Litex Lovech to join a trial period. He made his team debut a few days later in a 4–1 friendly win against Chavdar Etropole. In December 2008, Litex signed Madureira to a three-year deal. He was given the number 15 shirt.

Madureira marked his Litex Lovech competitive debut with a goal in a 5–1 win away to Nesebar in the Bulgarian Cup on 4 March 2009. Until the end of the season, he earned 17 appearances and scored eight goals. Litex won the Bulgarian Cup on 26 May 2009, to grant Doka his first career cup in Bulgaria. In the final he scored and assisted for a 3–0 win against Pirin Blagoevgrad.

Doka scored his first goal of the 2009–10 season against Lokomotiv Plovdiv on 21 November 2009, scoring the fourth goal of a 5–0 home win. On 14 March 2010, he scored Litex's first goal in their 3–0 victory over Levski Sofia and was awarded Man of the Match. Litex won the A PFG on 2 May 2010 with a win at away to Lokomotiv Plovdiv. Doka scored the second goal for a 3–0 win.

Following the 2010–11 season, he earned 22 appearances in the A PFG, scored 12 goals and provided five assists. On 16 May 2011, Doka was named the ABF A PFG Player of the Season, by the professional footballers association of Bulgaria.

=== İstanbul Başakşehir ===
In late June 2011, Doka Madureira was signed by Turkish Süper Lig club Istanbul B.B. The Brazilian's contract is for 3 years, with the option for a 1-year extension. On 11 September 2011, he made his official debut as a starter in the 2:0 home win against Galatasaray in a Süper Lig match. On 24 September 2011, Doka Madureira scored his first goal for the team, converting a penalty in the 2:0 away win against Manisaspor. On 12 May 2012, Madureira received a red card in the 0:4 home loss against Bursaspor.

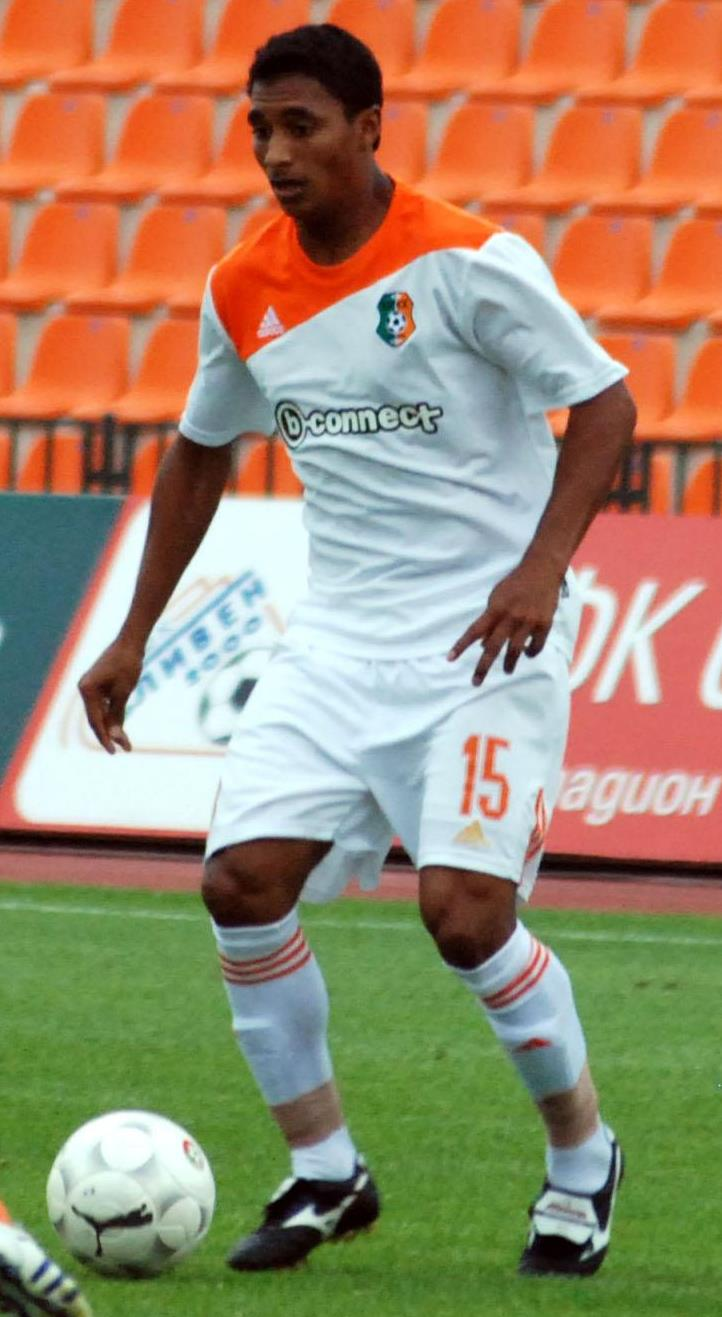
Doka Madureira playing for Litex Lovech

=== Ankaragücü ===
On 31 August 2017, Doka signed with Ankaragücü.

On 26 December 2017, Ank terminated Doka's contract for indiscipline and lack of physical commitment.

=== Atlético Acreano ===
On 24 April 2019, Atlético Acreano announced that Madureira had joined their club.

== Career statistics ==
As of 10 May 2016

Appearances and goals by club, season and competition
Club	Season	League		Cup		Europe		Total	
Club	Season	Apps	Goals	Apps	Goals	Apps	Goals	Apps	Goals
Litex Lovech	2008–09	14	6	3	2	0	0	17	8
Litex Lovech	2009–10	26	6	1	0	2	0	29	6
Litex Lovech	2010–11	22	12	4	1	2	0	28	13
Litex Lovech	Total	62	24	8	3	4	0	74	27
İstanbul B.B.	2011–12	39	14	2	0	–	–	41	14
İstanbul B.B.	2012–13	25	5	1	0	–	–	26	5
İstanbul B.B.	2013–14	31	11	1	1	–	–	32	12
İstanbul B.B.	2014–15	29	6	1	0	–	–	30	6
İstanbul B.B.	2015–16	30	3	7	1	2	1	39	5
İstanbul B.B.	Total	154	39	12	2	2	1	168	42
Career total		216	63	20	5	6	1	242	69

== Honours ==
Litex Lovech

- Bulgarian A PFG: 2009–10, 2010–11
- Bulgarian Cup: 2009
- Bulgarian Supercup: 2010

Individual

- ABF A PFG Player of the Year: 2010–11
