= Ravda =

Ravda Равда
- Village
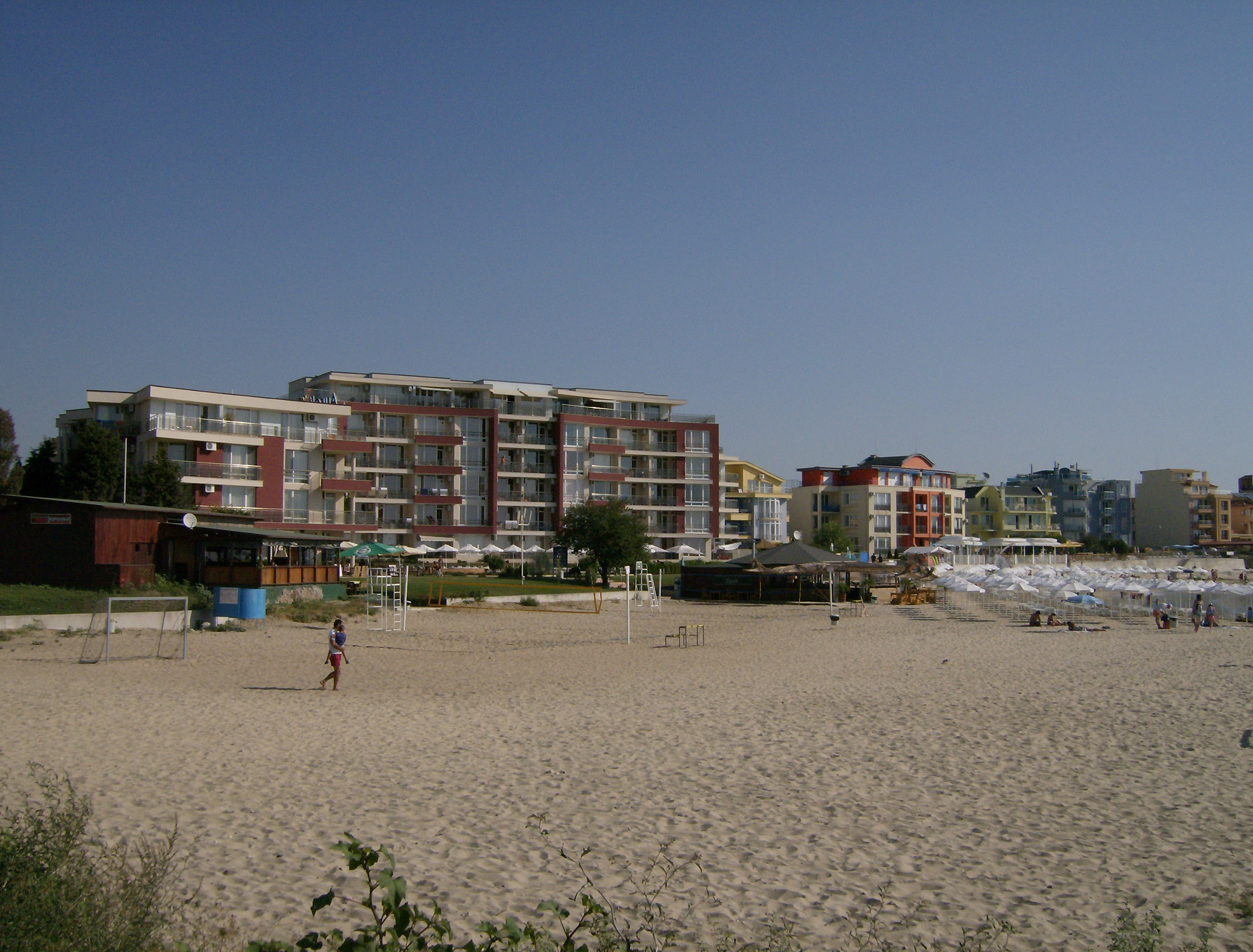

- Location within Bulgaria
- Coordinates: 42°39′N 27°41′E

Government
  - Mayor: Andon Bakalov

Population (2005)
  - Total: 1,745
- Postal code: 8238
- Area code: +359 554

Ravda (Bulgarian: Равда, Greek: Ράβδα) a coastal village and seaside resort in southeastern Bulgaria, situated in Nesebar municipality, Burgas Province. Ravda is a small seaside resort on the Black Sea, located 3 km from Nesebar and 5 km from Sunny Beach. 30 km from Bourgas airport. After 1924, Bulgarian refugees from the villages of Koufalia, Bozets, Kirkalovo, Mikro Monastiri, Barovitsa, Ramel, Krya Vrysi, Kadinovo and Axios in Aegean Macedonia settled in Ravda.

The average monthly temperature during the summer is 22°C (71°F). Ravda's beaches have fine sand. The area offers a combination of major hotel chains and small family hotels.

There are regular bus lines to the other resorts in the area — every 30 minutes to Burgas and every 20 minutes to Sunny Beach and Nesebar. Ravda's postal code is 8238, the telephone area code is +(359) 554, where (359) is the country code. As of 2005 the village has a population of 1,745. It lies at 42°39′N 27°41′E, at sea level.

== Honour ==
Ravda Peak on Livingston Island in the South Shetland Islands, Antarctica is named after Ravda.
