= Marcão (footballer, born 1989) =

Brazilian footballer

Personal information
- Full name: Marcos da Silva Bonfim
- Date of birth: 7 January 1989 (age 37)
- Place of birth: São Paulo, Brazil
- Height: 1.87 m (6 ft 1 1/2 in)
- Position: Midfielder

Team information
- Current team: Lusitano VRSA
- Number: 8

Youth career
- União São João
- 2007: Portuguesa
- 2008: Flamengo-SP

Senior career*
Years	Team	Apps	(Gls)
2008	Colo-Colo		
2009	Varginha EC		
2010	Sumaré		
2010	Juventus-SC		
2010–2011	Akademik Sofia	21	(1)
2011–2012	Polonia 1912 Leszno		
2012–2013	Feirense	11	(0)
2013–2014	Rah Ahan	1	(0)
2014–2015	Al Khaleej		
2016–	Lusitano VRSA	23	(0)
- * Club domestic league appearances and goals as of 9 April 2017

Marcos da Silva Bonfim or simply Marcão (born 7 January 1989) is a Brazilian football midfielder who plays for Lusitano VRSA.

== Club career ==
He made his professional debut in the First Professional Football League for Akademik on 21 August 2010 in a game against Sliven.
