= Mikro Monastiri =

Mikro Monastiri Μικρό Μοναστήρι
- Community
- Location within Greece
- Coordinates: 40°42.3′N 22°32.5′E
- Country: Greece
- Administrative region: Central Macedonia
- Regional unit: Thessaloniki
- Municipality: Chalkidona
- Municipal unit: Chalkidona

Area
  - Community: 36.45 km^{2} (14.07 sq mi)
- Elevation: 11 m (36 ft)

Population (2021)
  - Community: 1,779
  - Density: 48.81/km^{2} (126.4/sq mi)
- Time zone: UTC+2 (EET)
  - Summer (DST): UTC+3 (EEST)
- Postal code: 570 07
- Area code: +30-2391
- Vehicle registration: NA to NX

Mikro Monastiri (Greek: Μικρό Μοναστήρι lit: "Little Monastery") is a village and a community of the Chalkidona municipality in Thessaloniki regional unit, Greece. Before the 2011 local government reform it was part of the municipality of Chalkidona, of which it was a municipal district. The 2021 census recorded 1,779 inhabitants in the community. The community of Mikro Monastiri covers an area of 36.45 km Historically, the existence of the village dates back to the Byzantine years Empire. During the Turkish occupation, the village bore the name "Zorbas". The word zorbas in the Turkish language is used to describe the violent,[2] the lad, but also the oppressed, the forced. It is believed that this name was given to the village because of its inhabitants, who passed through a lot hardships and difficulties from robber raids, but also from diseases. According to another version, because of these raids, all the inhabitants of the village were armed, so the name Zorbas was given with the meaning of the lad, the cruel one. Inhabitants of the village have been the indigenous natives for years. In 1924, however, as part of the population exchange agreement between Greece and Bulgaria, refugees from eastern Romilia arrived and settled in the village. Thus, in 1927, when it was decided to give a Greek name to the village, it was decided to be Mikro Monastiri, in memory of the village of the same name in eastern Romilia, which was the birthplace of the refugees. In the 1950s, groups of Sarakatsans arrived in the village. Somehow, a fusion of cultures and people was created. The village and its history are mentioned extensively in Penelope Delta's multi-award winning novel, 'In the Mysteries of the Swamp', contributing decisively to the Macedonian Struggle in the midst of Turkish rule, as well as to formation of Greek consciousness among the citizens. A prominent figure in the area is Teacher Electra Drakou or Mrs. Electra, as she is mentioned in the novel by Penelope Delta, who secretly supplied food, weapons, and even letters to the Macedonian fighters in Valtos Giannitsson and hid priests and rebels in her school who were wanted by the Turks and the Bulgarians. In fact, once the Bulgarians attacked her with bombs in her school, and despite her injuries she fought like a beast with her weapon. Due to her contribution to the struggle and the deep appreciation that the residents have for her, on July 2, 2016, a bust of her was presented by the local artist Stavroula Apostolidou and a feast was held in her honor, in fact it was established annually on July 7 that a feast be held in her honor. Nowadays the inhabitants of the village are mainly farmers and are engaged in the cultivation of rice, cotton, corn, alfalfa and industrial tomatoes. Several of them are also engaged in animal husbandry. As far as the church is concerned, the village has two churches, one of Agios Dimitrios in the square next to the school of the teacher Elektra and one of the Dormition of the Virgin in the cemeteries where it date at least somewhere around 1800. The village has a football team, the Macedonian of Mikro Monastiri, the football player of Aris,[3]Christos Karkamanis, started his career from this team where he was a native of Mikro Monastiri.^{2}.

== Administrative division ==
The community of Mikro Monastiri consists of two communities:

- Loudias (population 665 in 2021)
- Mikro Monastiri (population 1,114)

== Notable natives ==
- Traianos Dellas, international football player

== See also ==
- List of settlements in the Thessaloniki regional unit
