= Ivaylo Danchev =

Bulgarian football player

Personal information
- Full name: Ivaylo Danchev Pavlov
- Date of birth: 31 March 1984 (age 42)
- Place of birth: Bulgaria
- Height: 1.84 m (6 ft 1/2 in)
- Position: Forward

Senior career*
Years	Team	Apps	(Gls)
2002–2004	Botev Vratsa	13	(1)
2004–2006	Dobrudzha Dobrich	24	(1)
2006–2012	Botev Vratsa		
- * Club domestic league appearances and goals as of 17 May 2010

Ivaylo Danchev Pavlov (Bulgarian: Ивайло Данчев Павлов) (born 31 March 1984 in Vratsa) is a Bulgarian former footballer who played as a forward.
