= Hristo Gospodinov =

Bulgarian footballer

Personal information
- Full name: Hristo Zhivkov Gospodinov
- Date of birth: 18 January 1979 (age 47)
- Place of birth: Sofia, Bulgaria
- Height: 1.78 m (5 ft 10 in)
- Position: Midfielder

Youth career
- Levski Sofia

Senior career*
Years	Team	Apps	(Gls)
1998–2000	Yantra Gabrovo	?	(?)
2000–2002	Vidima-Rakovski	46	(0)
2002–2003	Slavia Sofia	5	(0)
2003–2006	Vidima-Rakovski	68	(4)
2006–2008	Belasitsa Petrich	55	(4)
2008–2010	Minyor Pernik	48	(8)
2011	Vidima-Rakovski	24	(2)
2012	Etar 1924	12	(3)
2012	Lyubimets 2007	4	(0)
2013–2014	Vitosha Bistritsa	23	(2)
Total		285	(23)

Managerial career
- 2016–2017: Levski-Rakovski U17
- 2017–2023: Ludogorets Razgrad U17
- 2023–2025: Minyor Pernik
- 2025–: Belasitsa Petrich
- * Club domestic league appearances and goals as of 23 May 2014

Hristo Gospodinov (Bulgarian: Христо Господинов; born 18 January 1979 in Sofia) is a Bulgarian retired football midfielder.

== Playing career ==
He has previously played for Yantra Gabrovo, Slavia Sofia, Belasitsa Petrich, Minyor Pernik, Vidima-Rakovski Sevlievo, Etar 1924 and Lyubimets 2007.

== Manager career ==
On 10 August 2017 he took over at Ludogorets Razgrad U17 after previously being a head coach of Levski-Rakovski U17.
