= 2008–09 B Group =

Bulgarian B Group
- Season: 2008–09
- Champions: Montana (West); Beroe (East)
- Promoted: Montana; Beroe; Sportist Svoge
- Relegated: Chavdar Byala Slatina; Spartak Pleven; Naftex; Lokomotiv Stara Zagora; Maritsa
- Matches: 450
- Goals: 1,119 (2.49 per match)

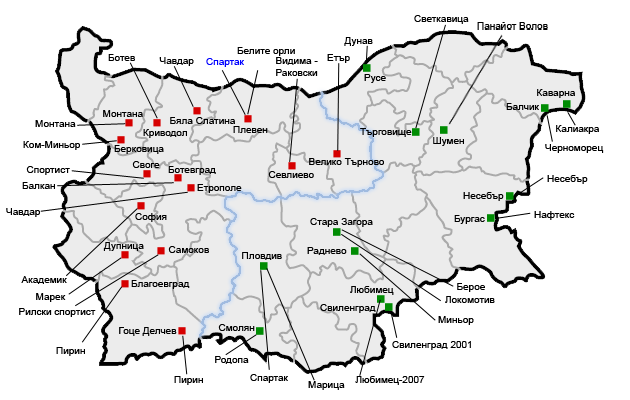
B PFG 2008-09 team distribution

The 2008–09 B Group was the 53rd season of the Bulgarian B Football Group, the second tier of the Bulgarian football league system. The season started on 16 August 2008 and finished on 17 June 2009 with the A Group promotion play-off between the runners-up from both divisions.

== Stadia, Locations and Results ==
=== West B Group ===
==== Teams Competing ====
- Etar 1924 Veliko Tarnovo
- Spartak Pleven
- PFC Chavdar Byala Slatina
- Akademik Sofia
- Pirin Gotse Delchev
- Montana
- Belite orli Pleven
- Rilski Sportist Samokov
- Sportist Svoge
- Chavdar Etropole
- Vidima-Rakovski Sevlievo (relegated from A Group)
- Marek Dupnitsa (relegated from A Group)
- Botev Krivodol (winners of North-Western V group)
- Kom-Minyor (runners-up of North-Western V group)
- Balkan Botevgrad (runners-up of South-Western V group)
- Bansko^{1}

^{1}FC Bansko replaced FC Pirin Blagoevgrad, last season's winners of the South-West group, when it merged with another club from Blagoevgrad, which is playing the A PFG.

==== Table ====
Pos	Team	Pld	W	D	L	GF	GA	GD	Pts	Promotion or relegation
1	Montana (C, P)	30	22	4	4	63	21	+42	70	Promotion to 2009–10 A Group
2	Sportist Svoge (Q, P)	30	19	6	5	54	25	+29	63	Qualification for Promotion play-off
3	Bansko	30	17	9	4	52	23	+29	60	
4	Chavdar Etropole	30	15	9	6	45	30	+15	54	
5	Balkan Botevgrad	30	15	4	11	38	34	+4	49	
6	Rilski Sportist	30	15	4	11	34	39	−5	49	
7	Vidima-Rakovski	30	11	10	9	31	25	+6	43	
8	Akademik Sofia	30	12	6	12	39	35	+4	42	
9	Pirin Gotse Delchev	30	11	7	12	48	39	+9	40	
10	Botev Krivodol	30	10	8	12	32	46	−14	38	
11	Kom-Minyor	30	8	9	13	32	47	−15	33	
12	Belite orli	30	8	5	17	27	43	−16	29	
13	Etar 1924	30	6	10	14	36	45	−9	28	
14	Marek Dupnitsa	30	7	7	16	29	48	−19	28	
15	Chavdar Byala Slatina (R)	30	7	5	18	31	41	−10	26	Relegation to 2009–10 V Group
16	Spartak Pleven	30	3	5	22	10	60	−50	14	Club Folded (Note: Spartak Pleven went bankrupt in January 2009 and folded at the end of the season)

Source: Soccerway
Rules for classification: 1) points; 2) goal difference; 3) number of goals scored.
(C) Champions; (P) Promoted; (Q) Qualified for the phase indicated; (R) Relegated

=== East B Group ===
==== Teams Competing ====
- Naftex Burgas
- Maritsa Plovdiv
- Spartak Plovdiv
- Dunav Ruse
- Shumen
- Kaliakra Kavarna
- Svetkavitsa
- Minyor Radnevo
- Nesebar
- Rodopa Smolyan
- Svilengrad
- Beroe Stara Zagora (relegated from A Group)
- Chernomorets Balchik (runners-up of North-Eastern V group)
- Lyubimets 2007 (winners of South-Eastern V group)
- Lokomotiv Stara Zagora (runners-up of South-Eastern V group)

^{1}No second team from North-Eastern V group was promoted because the winners, Dobrudzha Dobrich, and Ariston Ruse, team that should have replaced it, refused to participate and will play in this season's V Group.

==== Table ====
Pos	Team	Pld	W	D	L	GF	GA	GD	Pts	Promotion or relegation
1	Beroe Stara Zagora (C, P)	28	20	6	2	48	19	+29	66	Promotion to 2009–10 A Group
2	Naftex Burgas (Note: Burgas folded on the 6 July 2009 and all their results were annulled from the competition.) (Q)	28	18	7	3	59	21	+38	61	Qualification for Promotion play-off
3	Kaliakra Kavarna	28	14	6	8	39	28	+11	48	
4	Spartak Plovdiv	28	11	8	9	30	33	−3	41	
5	Dunav Ruse	28	11	6	11	35	34	+1	39	
6	Nesebar	28	12	2	14	36	32	+4	38	
7	Lyubimets 2007	28	10	8	10	30	29	+1	38	
8	Svetkavitsa	28	9	7	12	37	40	−3	34	
9	Svilengrad	28	9	7	12	32	40	−8	34	
10	Minyor Radnevo	28	10	3	15	35	47	−12	33	
11	Lokomotiv Stara Zagora	28	8	8	12	31	36	−5	32	Club Folded
12	Rodopa Smolyan	28	8	7	13	33	48	−15	31	
13	Chernomorets Balchik	28	8	7	13	30	39	−9	31	
14	Shumen	28	8	6	14	22	34	−12	30	
15	Maritsa Plovdiv (R)	28	9	2	17	21	38	−17	29	Relegation to 2009–10 V Group

Source: Soccerway.
Rules for classification: 1) points; 2) goal difference; 3) number of goals scored.
(C) Champions; (P) Promoted; (Q) Qualified for the phase indicated; (R) Relegated

== Promotion play-off ==
17 June 2009

Naftex Burgas	2–2	Sportist Svoge
Orachev 10'; Kaloyanov 82'	Report	Pavlov 52'; Antonov 72'
Penalties
Kovachev (penalty missed); Penev (penalty scored); Orachev (penalty missed); Valeriev (penalty scored)	2–4	(penalty scored) N. Ivanov; (penalty scored) Pavlov; (penalty scored) Dimitrov; (penalty scored) Ts. Ivanov

Lovech Stadium, Lovech
Attendance: 1,000
Referee: Anton Genov
