= Martin Stefanov =

Bulgarian footballer

Personal information
- Full name: Martin Miroslavov Stefanov
- Date of birth: 25 April 1987 (age 39)
- Place of birth: Vidin, Bulgaria
- Height: 1.88 m (6 ft 2 in)
- Position: Forward

Team information
- Current team: Sportist Svoge
- Number: 19

Youth career
- Slavia Sofia

Senior career*
Years	Team	Apps	(Gls)
2004–2007	Slavia Sofia	28	(1)
2007–2009	Sportist Svoge	33	(15)
2009–2010	Nesebar	24	(8)
2010–2011	Spartak Plovdiv	22	(7)
2011	Botev Plovdiv	8	(1)
2012–	Sportist Svoge	8	(1)
- * Club domestic league appearances and goals as of 24 May 2012

Martin Stefanov (Bulgarian: Мартин Стефанов; born 25 April 1987) is a Bulgarian footballer, who currently plays as a forward for Sportist Svoge.
