= Asparuh Vasilev =

Bulgarian footballer

Personal information
- Full name: Asparuh Stefanov Vasilev
- Date of birth: 14 November 1981 (age 44)
- Place of birth: Sofia, Bulgaria
- Height: 1.82 m (5 ft 11 1/2 in)
- Position: Wide midfielder

Team information
- Current team: Slivnishki geroi
- Number: 22

Youth career
- CSKA Sofia

Senior career*
Years	Team	Apps	(Gls)
2001–2004	Spartak Varna	15	(0)
2006–2007	Vihar Gorublyane	23	(6)
2007–2011	Akademik Sofia	102	(28)
2011	Atromitos Yeroskipou	15	(2)
2012–	Slivnishki geroi	10	(3)
- * Club domestic league appearances and goals as of 8 June 2011

Asparuh Vasilev (Bulgarian: Аспарух Василев) (born 14 November 1981 in Sofia) is a Bulgarian football midfielder who currently plays for Slivnishki geroi.

Vasilev previously played for Spartak Varna and Akademik Sofia in the A PFG.
