= Emil Koparanov =

Bulgarian footballer (born 1983)

Personal information
- Full name: Emil Haralambiev Koparanov
- Date of birth: 14 June 1983 (age 43)
- Place of birth: Bulgaria
- Height: 1.96 m (6 ft 5 in)
- Positions: Centre back; defensive midfielder

Team information
- Current team: Lokomotiv GO
- Number: 15

Youth career
- 1991–2002: Etar 1924

Senior career*
Years	Team	Apps	(Gls)
2002–2007	FC Kilifarevo	?	(?)
2008–2009	Etar 1924	37	(1)
2010	Chernomorets Burgas	2	(0)
2010–2011	Chernomorets Pomorie	24	(3)
2011–2012	Montana	18	(1)
2012–2013	Lyubimets 2007	30	(1)
2015	Etar Veliko Tarnovo	11	(1)
2015–2016	Dobrudzha Dobrich	16	(0)
2016–2017	Pavlikeni	?	(?)
2017	Sevlievo	?	(?)
2018–2020	Yantra Polski Trambesh	?	(?)
2021	Akademik Svishtov	?	(?)
2021–2022	Lokomotiv Dryanovo	?	(?)
2022–	Lokomotiv GO	0	(0)
- * Club domestic league appearances and goals as of 20 June 2018

Emil Koparanov (Bulgarian: Емил Копаранов; born 14 June 1983) is a Bulgarian football defender.
