= FC Botev Krivodol =

Bulgarian football club

Botev Krivodol
- Nickname(s): Ботевци
- Founded: 1924; 101 years ago
- Ground: Hristo Botev
- Capacity: 8,000
- Chairman: (Bulgaria) Georgi Georgiev
Home colours	Away colours

FC Botev Krivodol (ФК Ботев Криводол) is a Bulgarian football club from the town of Krivodol, currently playing in the North-West V AFG, the third division of Bulgarian football. Its home matches take place at the Hristo Botev Stadium.

== Honours ==
- North-West V AFG
  - Winners: 2007–08
- Tenth place in the Western "B" group: 2008/09
- 1/4 finalist in the National Cup Tournament: at that time the official name is the Cup of Bulgaria - 2008/09

== History ==
The club was officially founded in 1924 under the name Levski. In 1957 the club called Botev. Club colors are green and black.

Botev's previous logo

During 2007–2008 season the team took first place in Bulgarian North-West V AFG, thus qualified in the Bulgarian B Professional Football Group for the upcoming season.

Season 2008-09 is a first for the club for all time in Bulgarian professional football. Botev Krivodol qualified at the 1/8 finals of the Bulgarian Cup 2008-09 after defeating Beroe Stara Zagora with 1:0 and beating surprisingly elite Slavia Sofia with 2:1 to make it to the 1/8 finals of the competition. At the 1/8 finals the draw met Botev Krivodol with Rodopa Smolyan. The match took place at Smolyan and Botev Krivodol surprisingly beat Rodopa with 1:3 and qualified for the first time at the 1/4 finals of the tournament.

== Botev season performances ==
- 2005-06: North-West V AFG (10th)
- 2006-07: North-West V AFG (6th)
- 2007-08: North-West V AFG (1st Promotion)
- 2008-09: B PFG (10th)
- 2009-10: B PFG (13th)

== Current squad ==
As of September 13, 2011 Note: Flags indicate national team as defined under FIFA eligibility rules; some limited exceptions apply. Players may hold more than one non-FIFA nationality.

No.	Pos.	Nation	Player
3	DF	BUL	Rosen Ganovski
5	DF	BUL	Ivaylo Zarchev
7	MF	BUL	Georgi Ivanov
8	MF	BUL	Konstantin Genkov
9	FW	BUL	Angel Hristov
10	MF	BUL	Nikolay Metodiev
11	FW	BUL	Tihomir Yosifov
16	MF	BUL	Aleksandar Tsenov

No.	Pos.	Nation	Player
18	MF	BUL	Emiliyan Petrov
19	FW	BUL	Lyuben Valkov
22	DF	BUL	Emiliyan Ivov
25	DF	BUL	Genadi Petrov
32	MF	BUL	Emanuil Dimitrov
46	GK	BUL	Plamen Marinov
15	CB	BUL	Plamen Pantev
