= Stadion Hadzhi Dimitar =

Multi-purpose stadium in Sliven, Bulgaria

- Interactive map of Stadion Hadzhi Dimitar
- Full name: Hadzhi Dimitar Sport Complex
- Location: Sliven, Bulgaria
- Coordinates: 42°40′45.50″N 26°20′12″E
- Owner: Municipality of Sliven
- Operator: Sliven
- Capacity: 10,000
- Surface: Grass
- Field size: 105 X 68

Construction
- Groundbreaking: 1956
- Built: 1956 - 1959
- Opened: 1959
- Renovated: 1984 - 1989, 2009
- Expanded: 1989

Tenants
- Sliven (1959–); Etar 1924 (2013); Neftochimic Burgas (2013–2014)

Stadion Hadzhi Dimitar (Bulgarian: Стадион „Хаджи Димитър“, English: 'Hadzhi Dimitar Stadium') is a multi-purpose stadium in Sliven, Bulgaria. It is currently used for football matches and is the home ground of OFC Sliven 2000. The stadium holds 10,000 people.

- The stadium is a part of a big multifunctional sport complex, which includes a swimming pool, tennis courts, 2 training pitches and a 4-star hotel.
- The athletic track of the stadium meets all of the IAAF requirements to host international competitions.
- The stadium complex also has the only training pitch with FieldTurf flooring in Bulgaria.

In 2008, due to the promotion of OFC Sliven 2000 in the A PFG, plastic seats were installed in the stands of the stadium.

In 2009, the mayor of Sliven, Yordan Letchkov, announced that he plans also to install electric lighting to the stadium, right before the start of the new football campaign.
