= Vasil Kaloyanov =

Bulgarian footballer

Personal information
- Full name: Vasil Dimitrov Kaloyanov
- Date of birth: 13 July 1988 (age 38)
- Place of birth: Burgas, Bulgaria
- Height: 1.90 m (6 ft 3 in)
- Position: Forward

Team information
- Current team: Lokomotiv Mezdra
- Number: 32

Youth career
- Chernomorets Burgas

Senior career*
Years	Team	Apps	(Gls)
2005–2006	Chernomorets Burgas	23	(8)
2006–2008	Pomorie	28	(15)
2008	Svetkavitsa	12	(4)
2009	Naftex Burgas	10	(1)
2009–2011	Chernomorets Pomorie	37	(10)
2012	Slavia Sofia	11	(0)
2012	→ Neftochimic 1986 (loan)	7	(7)
2013	Neftochimic 1986	23	(4)
2014	Master Burgas	14	(11)
2014	Botev Vratsa	8	(2)
2015	Bdin Vidin	10	(3)
2015–2016	Sozopol	23	(13)
2016–2017	Vereya	15	(2)
2017	Septemvri Sofia	10	(0)
2018	Chernomorets Balchik	11	(3)
2018	Tsarsko Selo	9	(0)
2019	Chernomorets Burgas	–	(–)
2019	Chernomorets Balchik	9	(2)
2020	Sportist Svoge	1	(0)
2020–2021	Marek Dupnitsa	15	(9)
2021	Septemvri Simitli	8	(0)
2022	Rilski Sportist	15	(2)
2022–	Lokomotiv Mezdra	91	(52)
- * Club domestic league appearances and goals as of 16 November 2026

Vasil Kaloyanov (Bulgarian: Васил Калоянов; born 13 July 1988) is a Bulgarian professional footballer who plays as a forward for Lokomotiv Mezdra.

== Career ==
In July 2017 Kaloyanov joined Septemvri Sofia.

On 24 July 2018, he signed with Tsarsko Selo.

== Awards ==
- Champion of B PFG 2013 (with Neftochimic 1986)
