= FC Ravda 1954 =

Bulgarian football club

FC Ravda
- Full name: FC Ravda 1954
- Founded: 1954; 71 years ago
- Ground: Ravda Stadium, Ravda
- Chairman: (Bulgaria) Dimitar Hrusafov
- Manager: (Bulgaria) Marin Baychev
- League: Regional division Burgas
Home colours	Away colours

FC Ravda 1954 (Bulgarian: ФК Равда 1954) is a Bulgarian football club from the village of Ravda nearby city Nesebar, which currently competes in the A RFG, the fourth tier of the Bulgarian football league pyramid.per WP:Linking

== History ==
The club was originally established in 1954 but after a few years was dissolved. In 2009 OFC Chernomorets Nesebar was relocated in Ravda, renamed as FC Ravda 1954 and was named as a successor of the former FC Ravda. The biggest success in the club's history came in 2010, when the team earned promotion to the Bulgarian B PFG by decisively winning the South-East V AFG. The club's home ground is the Municipal Stadium in Ravda, which has a capacity for 2,000 spectators, but the team plays its home matches at Nesebar due to renovation at stadium. On 20 October Ravda 1954 withdrew from Eastern B PFG.

== Honours ==
- South-East V AFG
  - Champions 2009–10
- Cup of Bulgarian Amateur Football League
  - Winners 2009-10
