= List of Bulgarian football transfers winter 2012–13 =

This is a list of Bulgarian football transfers for the 2012–13 winter transfer window. Only transfers involving a team from the A PFG and B PFG are listed. The window is closed at midnight on 28 February 2013. Players without a club may join one at any time, either during or in between transfer windows.

== A PFG ==
=== Beroe ===
In:

| No. | Pos. | Nation | Player |
|---|---|---|---|
| 5 | DF | BUL | Borislav Stoychev (from Minyor Pernik) |
| 10 | FW | BUL | Ventsislav Hristov (from Chernomorets Burgas) |
| 11 | MF | BUL | Doncho Atanasov (from Cherno More) |
| 17 | MF | BUL | Plamen Krumov (from (Romania) Universitatea Cluj) |
| 18 | MF | BUL | Atanas Zehirov (from (Norway) Hasle-Løren IL) |
| 25 | MF | POR | Paulo Jorge (on loan from (England) Blackburn Rovers) |
| 27 | MF | FRA | Igor Djoman (from (France) Vendée Poiré sur Vie Football) |
| 70 | FW | MOZ | Jerry Sitoe (on loan from (Portugal) AD Oeiras) |
| 71 | MF | ALG | Amir Sayoud (from (Egypt) Al Ahly) |
| 73 | GK | BUL | Ivan Karadzhov (from Lokomotiv Plovdiv) |
| 80 | FW | BUL | Emil Angelov (from (Turkey) Konyaspor) |

Out:

| No. | Pos. | Nation | Player |
|---|---|---|---|
| 1 | GK | BUL | Martin Temenliev (released) |
| 5 | DF | CRO | Vanja Džaferović (retired) |
| 11 | FW | BRA | Rodolfo Xavier Neves (released) |
| 16 | MF | BUL | Stefan Velev (to Levski Sofia) |
| 18 | DF | CMR | Dieudonné Owona (released) |
| 20 | MF | POR | Fernando Livramento (to Slavia Sofia) |
| 22 | FW | BRA | João Sales (to (Brazil) CA Linense) |
| 23 | MF | BUL | Todor Hristov (to Marek Dupnitsa) |
| 25 | DF | BUL | Miroslav Enchev (to Neftochimic Burgas) |
| 71 | MF | BUL | Georgi Bozhanov (on loan to Minyor Pernik) |

=== Botev Plovdiv ===
In:

| No. | Pos. | Nation | Player |
|---|---|---|---|
| 1 | GK | POL | Adam Stachowiak (from (Poland) GKS Bełchatów) |
| 9 | FW | NED | Luís Pedro (from (Netherlands) Heracles Almelo) |
| 13 | MF | BUL | Nikolay Pavlov (from Lyubimetz 2007) |
| 14 | DF | BUL | Veselin Minev (from (Turkey) Antalyaspor) |
| 15 | DF | NED | Marlon Pereira (from (Netherlands) Willem II) |
| 71 | MF | BUL | Boris Galchev (from (Romania) Dinamo București) |
| 83 | DF | CUW | Civard Sprockel (from CSKA Sofia) |

Out:

| No. | Pos. | Nation | Player |
|---|---|---|---|
| 1 | GK | BUL | Hristo Ivanov (to Montana) |
| 10 | MF | ESP | Rubén Palazuelos (to (Finland) Honka Espoo) |
| 17 | DF | BUL | Ivaylo Dimitrov (released) |
| 20 | MF | BUL | Lachezar Angelov (on loan to Rakovski) |
| 22 | DF | BUL | Radoslav Terziev (on loan to Rakovski) |
| 23 | GK | LTU | Ernestas Šetkus (to (Belarus) Gomel) |
| 28 | DF | BUL | Lazar Marin (on loan to Rakovski) |
| 89 | DF | BUL | Stefan Stanchev (to Minyor Pernik) |
| 90 | FW | BUL | Petar Atanasov (on loan to Rakovski) |
| 92 | FW | BFA | Habib Bamogo (released) |

=== Botev Vratsa ===
In:

| No. | Pos. | Nation | Player |
|---|---|---|---|
| 15 | DF | BUL | Petar Alyoshev (from Slavia Sofia) |
| 16 | MF | BUL | Tsvetelin Tonev (on loan from Levski Sofia) |
| 17 | FW | BUL | Ivan Kokonov (on loan from Slavia Sofia) |
| 18 | MF | BUL | Pavel Petkov (from Lokomotiv Sofia) |
| 21 | GK | BUL | Zdravko Chavdarov (Free agent) |
| 23 | MF | BUL | Vasil Velev (from Lokomotiv Sofia) |
| 33 | GK | BUL | Ivaylo Yanachkov (from Montana) |

Out:

| No. | Pos. | Nation | Player |
|---|---|---|---|
| 9 | MF | URU | Ignacio Lores (loan return to (Italy) Palermo) |
| 10 | MF | ITA | Massimiliano Ammendola (to (Greece) Iraklis Psachna) |
| 12 | GK | BUL | Dimitar Ivanov (released) |
| 15 | DF | URU | Pablo Caballero (released) |
| 16 | FW | ARG | Nicolas Celeste (released) |
| 18 | FW | URU | Sasha Aneff (loan return to (Uruguay) Defensor Sporting) |
| 21 | GK | BUL | Mihail Ivanov (to Levski Sofia) |
| 23 | FW | ITA | Roberto Floriano (to (Italy) Pistoiese 1921) |
| — | DF | ITA | Giuseppe Pira (released) |
| — | MF | BRA | Augusto (released) |
| — | MF | BRA | Kassio (released) |
| — | FW | BUL | Branimir Kostadinov (to Lokomotiv Sofia, previously on loan at (Slovakia) Tatran Prešov) |

=== Cherno More ===
In:

| No. | Pos. | Nation | Player |
|---|---|---|---|
| 1 | GK | BUL | Emil Mihaylov (from Lokomotiv Sofia) |
| 8 | MF | BUL | Kosta Yanev (from CSKA Sofia) |
| 11 | MF | BUL | Simeon Raykov (from Levski Sofia) |
| 13 | MF | BUL | Todor Kolev (Free agent) |
| 18 | DF | SLO | Sebastjan Komel (from (Belgium) Royal Antwerp) |
| 19 | FW | FRA | Bruce Inkango (from (Romania) Oțelul Galați) |
| 83 | MF | ESP | Cristian (from (Cyprus) Alki Larnaca) |

Out:

| No. | Pos. | Nation | Player |
|---|---|---|---|
| 1 | GK | BUL | Petar Denchev (to Lokomotiv Plovdiv) |
| 8 | MF | BUL | Kosta Yanev (released) |
| 11 | MF | BUL | Doncho Atanasov (to Beroe Stara Zagora) |
| 12 | DF | BUL | Martin Dechev (to Montana) |
| 18 | DF | BUL | Ivelin Yanev (to Lokomotiv Sofia) |
| 19 | MF | BUL | Hristian Popov (to Svilengrad 1921) |
| 20 | MF | BUL | Stamen Angelov (to Neftochimic Burgas) |
| 22 | GK | BUL | Plamen Kolev (to Vereya Stara Zagora) |
| 37 | GK | BUL | Stoyan Stavrev (retired) |
| 77 | MF | BUL | Viktor Mitev (to Dunav Ruse, previously on loan at Kaliakra Kavarna) |

=== Chernomorets Burgas ===
In:

| No. | Pos. | Nation | Player |
|---|---|---|---|
| 5 | DF | BUL | Tihomir Trifonov (from Etar 1924) |
| 15 | MF | MKD | Vančo Trajanov (from Minyor Pernik) |
| 21 | DF | BUL | Aleksandar Bashliev (from Levski Sofia) |
| 39 | MF | ALG | Yanis Youcef (from (Algeria) El Harrach) |
| 78 | FW | FRA | Loris Arnaud (from (France) Paris Saint-Germain) |

Out:

| No. | Pos. | Nation | Player |
|---|---|---|---|
| 5 | DF | BUL | Nikolay Nikolov (to Lokomotiv Sofia) |
| 8 | MF | BUL | Rumen Trifonov (to Lokomotiv Sofia) |
| 10 | FW | BUL | Ventsislav Hristov (to Beroe Stara Zagora) |
| 11 | MF | BUL | Daniel Mladenov (to Montana) |
| 23 | MF | POR | Pedro Mendes (released) |
| 25 | DF | BUL | Plamen Dimov (to Levski Sofia) |
| 94 | FW | CIV | Yannick Boli (to (Ukraine) Zorya Luhansk) |

=== CSKA Sofia ===
In:

| No. | Pos. | Nation | Player |
|---|---|---|---|
| 7 | FW | BUL | Spas Delev (Free agent) |
| 9 | MF | BRA | Marcinho (from (Brazil) Guaratinguetá) |
| 18 | MF | BUL | Ivaylo Chochev (from Chavdar Etropole) |
| 21 | DF | BUL | Ventsislav Vasilev (from Minyor Pernik) |
| 22 | FW | BUL | Martin Kamburov (from (China) Dalian Shide) |
| 70 | MF | URU | Ignacio Lores (on loan from (Italy) Palermo) |
| 85 | GK | BUL | Bozhidar Stoychev (loan return from Neftochimic Burgas) |

Out:

| No. | Pos. | Nation | Player |
|---|---|---|---|
| 2 | DF | FRA | Jérémie Rodrigues (released) |
| 5 | MF | BUL | Todor Yanchev (to Slavia Sofia) |
| 9 | MF | ARG | Sebastián Sciorilli (to (Chile) C.S.D. Rangers) |
| 16 | DF | CPV | Nilson Antonio (to (Portugal) Portimonense) |
| 20 | MF | ROU | Alexandru Păcurar (released) |
| 24 | MF | POR | Bernardo Tengarrinha (to (Portugal) Freamunde) |
| 29 | FW | BRA | Tássio (to (Brazil) Boa Esporte) |
| 33 | DF | FRA | Youness Bengelloun (released) |
| — | DF | CUW | Civard Sprockel (to Botev Plovdiv) |
| — | MF | BUL | Kosta Yanev (to Cherno More) |

=== Etar 1924 ===
In:

| No. | Pos. | Nation | Player |
|---|---|---|---|
| 4 | DF | POL | Krzysztof Hrymowicz (from (Poland) Zawisza Bydgoszcz) |
| 5 | DF | BEL | Laurent Castellana (from (Netherlands) MVV Maastricht) |
| 7 | MF | AFG | Faysal Shayesteh (from (Netherlands) Heerenveen) |
| 8 | MF | TUR | Fatih Yılmaz (from (Germany) Wilhelmshaven) |
| 10 | MF | FRA | Jacques Fey (Free agent) |
| 11 | MF | BUL | Lyubomir Lyubenov (from (Poland) Olimpia Elbląg) |
| 12 | GK | TUR | Yilmaz Aksoy (from (England) Leyton Orient) |
| 13 | MF | POL | Michał Protasewicz (from (Poland) Flota Świnoujście) |
| 14 | MF | SWE | Mehmet Mehmet (from (Sweden) IF Sylvia) |
| 15 | FW | BEL | Wim Bokila (from (Netherlands) SDOUC Ulft) |
| 16 | MF | BUL | Valentin Veselinov (from Dunav Ruse) |
| 17 | FW | SLE | Sulaiman Sesay-Fullah (from (Italy) Parma) |
| 18 | MF | CPV | Jerson Ribeiro (from (Netherlands) SBV Excelsior) |
| 19 | DF | FIN | Patrik Rikama (from (Sweden) GIF Sundsvall) |
| 20 | FW | SWE | Sonny Karlsson (from (Sweden) Ljungskile SK) |
| 21 | DF | NOR | Kai Risholt (from (Norway) Bryne) |
| 22 | DF | POL | Sławomir Cienciała (from (Poland) Podbeskidzie Bielsko-Biała) |
| 24 | MF | TUR | Ali Aydogan (from (Turkey) Kayserispor) |
| 25 | MF | GER | Paweł Grischok (from (Poland) Olimpia Grudziądz) |
| 32 | GK | POL | Mateusz Bąk (from (Poland) Podbeskidzie Bielsko-Biała) |
| 92 | FW | BUL | Bircent Karagaren (from Shumen 2010) |

Out:

| No. | Pos. | Nation | Player |
|---|---|---|---|
| 1 | GK | BUL | Tsvetomir Tsankov (to Neftochimic Burgas) |
| 3 | DF | BUL | Milcho Makendzhiev (released) |
| 6 | DF | BUL | Tihomir Trifonov (to Chernomorets Burgas) |
| 7 | MF | BUL | Radoslav Anev (to Pirin Blagoevgrad) |
| 8 | MF | BUL | Nikolay Petrov (to Dobrudzha Dobrich) |
| 9 | FW | BRA | Luiz Eduardo (to (Turkey) Adana Demirspor) |
| 10 | MF | BUL | Ahmed Hikmet (to Minyor Pernik) |
| 11 | MF | NED | Jasar Takak (released) |
| 12 | MF | BRA | Nerylon (to (Brazil) Monte Azul) |
| 13 | DF | BUL | Kostadin Gadzhalov (released) |
| 14 | MF | BUL | Chetin Sadula (to Lokomotiv Plovdiv) |
| 16 | DF | BUL | Georgi Gaydarov (released) |
| 18 | DF | ENG | Kasali Casal (released) |
| 21 | MF | BUL | Martin Stankev (to Bansko) |
| 21 | MF | CMR | Tiko Messina (released) |
| 22 | GK | MNE | Pavle Velimirović (released) |
| 23 | MF | GLP | Grégory Gendrey (to (France) Compiègne) |
| 27 | GK | BUL | Radoslav Rashkov (to Lyubimetz 2007) |
| 28 | DF | BUL | Atanas Atanasov (to Lokomotiv Plovdiv) |
| 30 | DF | BRA | Eli Marques (released) |
| 88 | GK | BUL | Ventsislav Dimitrov (released) |
| 91 | FW | MTQ | Yoan Pivaty (released) |

=== Levski Sofia ===
In:

| No. | Pos. | Nation | Player |
|---|---|---|---|
| 7 | MF | BUL | Milen Vasilev (from Minyor Pernik) |
| 11 | MF | CPV | Garry Mendes Rodrigues (from (Netherlands) ADO Den Haag) |
| 29 | MF | SLO | Rene Mihelič (on loan from (Portugal) Nacional) |
| 35 | DF | BUL | Plamen Dimov (from Chernomorets Burgas) |
| 77 | MF | BUL | Stefan Velev (from Beroe Stara Zagora) |
| 89 | GK | BUL | Mihail Ivanov (from Botev Vratsa) |

Out:

| No. | Pos. | Nation | Player |
|---|---|---|---|
| 11 | MF | BUL | Simeon Raykov (to Cherno More) |
| 14 | FW | GHA | Agyemang Opoku (released) |
| 17 | FW | BUL | Todor Chavorski (on loan to Pirin Razlog) |
| 20 | DF | BUL | Aleksandar Bashliev (to Chernomorets Burgas) |
| 21 | MF | BUL | Tsvetelin Tonev (on loan to Botev Vratsa) |
| 31 | MF | BRA | Marcinho (released) |

=== Litex Lovech ===
In:

| No. | Pos. | Nation | Player |
|---|---|---|---|
| 7 | MF | BRA | Vanger (from (Brazil) Boa Esporte) |
| 10 | FW | BRA | Stênio Júnior (from (Brazil) Horizonte) |

Out:

| No. | Pos. | Nation | Player |
|---|---|---|---|
| 7 | FW | BUL | Kostadin Bashov (to (Cyprus) AEP Paphos) |
| 10 | FW | BUL | Gerasim Zakov (to (China) Chengdu Blades) |
| 11 | FW | BUL | Borislav Borisov (to Lyubimetz 2007) |
| 12 | GK | BUL | Aleksandar Konov (on loan to Vidima-Rakovski) |
| 13 | FW | SEN | Papis Dembo Coly (released) |
| 22 | MF | BUL | Angel Zdravchev (on loan to Vidima-Rakovski) |
| 77 | MF | BUL | Galin Ivanov (loan return to Slavia Sofia) |

=== Lokomotiv Plovdiv ===
In:

| No. | Pos. | Nation | Player |
|---|---|---|---|
| 1 | GK | BUL | Petar Denchev (from Cherno More) |
| 9 | FW | BUL | Vladislav Mirchev (from (Kazakhstan) Irtysh Pavlodar) |
| 19 | MF | BUL | Chetin Sadula (from Etar 1924) |
| 21 | DF | BUL | Georgi Mechedzhiev (from Montana) |
| 28 | DF | BUL | Atanas Atanasov (from Etar 1924) |
| 82 | MF | BUL | Yordan Yurukov (from Minyor Pernik) |

Out:

| No. | Pos. | Nation | Player |
|---|---|---|---|
| 1 | GK | BUL | Stefano Kunchev (loan return to Slavia Sofia) |
| 7 | MF | BUL | Nikolay Stankov (released) |
| 19 | MF | BUL | Marin Petrov (retired) |
| 24 | MF | BUL | Konstantin Mirchev (to Slivnishki geroi) |
| 26 | MF | BUL | Nikolay Dyulgerov (to Slavia Sofia) |
| 33 | MF | BUL | Dimo Atanasov (to Slavia Sofia) |
| 39 | FW | BUL | Atanas Kurdov (released) |
| 71 | FW | BUL | Hristo Spasov (to Chepinets Velingrad) |
| 90 | DF | CYP | Stelios Demetriou (released) |

=== Lokomotiv Sofia ===
In:

| No. | Pos. | Nation | Player |
|---|---|---|---|
| 1 | GK | BUL | Bozhidar Mitrev (Free agent) |
| 3 | DF | BUL | Ivelin Yanev (from Cherno More) |
| 7 | MF | BUL | Iskren Pisarov (from Minyor Pernik) |
| 13 | FW | BRA | Wilker (Free agent) |
| 21 | MF | BUL | Rumen Trifonov (from Chernomorets Burgas) |
| 22 | MF | BUL | Antonio Tsankov (from Rakovski) |
| 23 | MF | BRA | Tom (from Minyor Pernik) |
| 26 | DF | BUL | Nikolay Nikolov (from Chernomorets Burgas) |
| 28 | MF | BUL | Marquinhos (from (China) Changchun Yatai) |
| 76 | FW | BUL | Krum Bibishkov (from Minyor Pernik) |
| 90 | FW | BUL | Branimir Kostadinov (from Botev Vratsa) |

Out:

| No. | Pos. | Nation | Player |
|---|---|---|---|
| 3 | DF | BUL | Yordan Varbanov (released) |
| 7 | MF | BUL | Vasil Velev (to Botev Vratsa) |
| 12 | MF | BUL | Dimitar Telkiyski (released) |
| 13 | MF | BUL | Yulian Petkov (to Lokomotiv Mezdra) |
| 21 | MF | BUL | Daniel Gadzhev (released) |
| 22 | MF | BUL | Pavel Petkov (to Botev Vratsa) |
| 23 | FW | BUL | Georgi Hristov (to (United States) Tampa Bay Rowdies) |
| 33 | GK | BUL | Emil Mihaylov (to Cherno More) |
| 90 | MF | BUL | Mladen Stoev (to Dobrudzha Dobrich) |

=== Ludogorets Razgrad ===
In:

| No. | Pos. | Nation | Player |
|---|---|---|---|
| 10 | MF | COL | Sebastián Hernández (from (Colombia) Independiente Medellín) |
| 15 | MF | SRB | Nemanja Milisavljević (from (Romania) Rapid București) |
| 21 | GK | BUL | Vladislav Stoyanov (from (Moldova) Sheriff Tiraspol) |

Out:

| No. | Pos. | Nation | Player |
|---|---|---|---|
| 30 | GK | BUL | Georgi Argilashki (on loan to Pirin Razlog) |
| 99 | MF | CIV | Franck Guela (released) |
| — | FW | BUL | Miroslav Antonov (to Slavia Sofia, previously on loan at Montana) |

=== Minyor Pernik ===
In:

| No. | Pos. | Nation | Player |
|---|---|---|---|
| 3 | DF | BUL | Adrian Olegov (from (Malta) Ħamrun Spartans) |
| 5 | MF | BUL | Ahmed Hikmet (from Etar 1924) |
| 9 | FW | CIV | Franck Madou (from (Switzerland) Wil 1900) |
| 17 | MF | BUL | Viktor Sofroniev (Free agent) |
| 19 | MF | BUL | Petar Petrov (from Montana) |
| 23 | MF | BUL | Stoyan Stefanov (from (Moldova) Costuleni) |
| 24 | DF | BUL | Dimitar Yalamov (from Balkan Belogradchik) |
| 71 | MF | BUL | Georgi Bozhanov (on loan from Beroe Stara Zagora) |
| 78 | FW | BEL | Jean-Baptiste Yakassongo (from (Belgium) Géants Athois) |
| 89 | DF | BUL | Stefan Stanchev (from Botev Plovdiv) |

Out:

| No. | Pos. | Nation | Player |
|---|---|---|---|
| 3 | DF | BUL | Ivan Mihov (to Montana) |
| 4 | DF | BUL | Nikolay Hristozov (to Dobrudzha Dobrich) |
| 5 | DF | BUL | Borislav Stoychev (to Beroe Stara Zagora) |
| 7 | MF | BUL | Milen Vasilev (to Levski Sofia) |
| 9 | FW | BUL | Nikolay Vladinov (released) |
| 11 | MF | BUL | Iliyan Iliev (to Montana) |
| 17 | MF | MKD | Vančo Trajanov (to Chernomorets Burgas) |
| 18 | MF | BUL | Iskren Pisarov (to Lokomotiv Sofia) |
| 23 | DF | BUL | Ventsislav Vasilev (to CSKA Sofia) |
| 33 | MF | BRA | Tom (to Lokomotiv Sofia) |
| 42 | MF | ALG | Farès Brahimi (to Montana) |
| 59 | FW | BUL | Ventsislav Ivanov (to Montana) |
| 76 | FW | BUL | Krum Bibishkov (to Lokomotiv Sofia) |
| 77 | MF | BUL | Yordan Yurukov (to Lokomotiv Plovdiv) |
| 99 | DF | ALG | Sabri Boumelaha (released) |

=== Montana ===
In:

| No. | Pos. | Nation | Player |
|---|---|---|---|
| 1 | GK | BUL | Hristo Ivanov (from Botev Plovdiv) |
| 3 | DF | BUL | Ivan Mihov (from Minyor Pernik) |
| 9 | FW | BUL | Vladislav Zlatinov (from Slavia Sofia) |
| 11 | MF | BUL | Iliyan Iliev (from Minyor Pernik) |
| 18 | MF | BUL | Slavcho Shokolarov (from Svetkavitsa) |
| 19 | FW | BUL | Ventsislav Ivanov (from Minyor Pernik) |
| 21 | MF | ALG | Farès Brahimi (from Minyor Pernik) |
| 23 | MF | BUL | Daniel Mladenov (from Chernomorets Burgas) |
| 25 | DF | BUL | Martin Dechev (from Cherno More) |
| 27 | MF | BRA | Thiago Miracema (on loan from (Brazil) Sampaio Corrêa) |

Out:

| No. | Pos. | Nation | Player |
|---|---|---|---|
| 2 | DF | BUL | Georgi Mechedzhiev (to Lokomotiv Plovdiv) |
| 9 | FW | BUL | Miroslav Antonov (loan return to Ludogorets Razgrad) |
| 10 | MF | BUL | Petar Petrov (to Minyor Pernik) |
| 12 | GK | BUL | Ivaylo Yanachkov (to Botev Vratsa) |
| 15 | MF | BUL | Andon Gushterov (to Septemvri Simitli) |
| 16 | MF | BUL | Dimitar Petkov (to (Georgia (country)) Zestaponi) |
| 18 | FW | BUL | Deyan Hristov (to Svetkavitsa) |
| 21 | MF | BUL | Samir Aess (to Lyubimetz 2007) |
| 23 | FW | BUL | Spas Georgiev (loan return to Slavia Sofia) |
| 26 | FW | BUL | Dimitar Vodenicharov (to Lyubimetz 2007) |

=== Pirin Gotse Delchev ===
In:

| No. | Pos. | Nation | Player |
|---|---|---|---|
| 14 | MF | BUL | Lyubomir Vitanov (from (Malta) Ħamrun Spartans) |
| 77 | MF | BUL | Mario Bliznakov (from Lyubimetz 2007) |

Out:

| No. | Pos. | Nation | Player |
|---|---|---|---|
| 14 | MF | BUL | Nikolay Dimirov (to Pirin Blagoevgrad) |
| 17 | MF | BUL | Nikola Nikolov (to F.C. Master Burgas) |

=== Slavia Sofia ===
In:

| No. | Pos. | Nation | Player |
|---|---|---|---|
| 5 | MF | BUL | Todor Yanchev (from CSKA Sofia) |
| 9 | FW | BUL | Todor Kolev (from (Greece) Olympiacos Volos) |
| 11 | FW | BUL | Radoslav Vasilev (loan return from Lyubimetz 2007) |
| 17 | MF | BUL | Dimo Atanasov (from Lokomotiv Plovdiv) |
| 19 | FW | BUL | Miroslav Antonov (from Ludogorets Razgrad) |
| 24 | FW | BUL | Spas Georgiev (loan return from Montana) |
| 26 | MF | BUL | Nikolay Dyulgerov (from Lokomotiv Plovdiv) |
| 32 | GK | BUL | Stefano Kunchev (loan return from Lokomotiv Plovdiv) |
| 33 | MF | BUL | Galin Ivanov (loan return from Litex Lovech) |
| 35 | MF | POR | Fernando Livramento (from Beroe Stara Zagora) |
| 99 | GK | BUL | Ivaylo Ivanov (Free agent) |

Out:

| No. | Pos. | Nation | Player |
|---|---|---|---|
| 5 | DF | BUL | Petar Alyoshev (to Botev Vratsa) |
| 9 | FW | BUL | Vladislav Zlatinov (to Montana) |
| 15 | DF | HUN | Miklós Gaál (to (Hungary) Pécsi MFC) |
| 17 | FW | BUL | Ivan Kokonov (on loan to Botev Vratsa) |
| 24 | MF | BUL | Maksim Stoykov (to Vidima-Rakovski) |
| 25 | MF | BUL | Nikolay Chipev (to Svetkavitsa) |
| 29 | FW | BUL | Vasil Kaloyanov (to Neftochimic Burgas) |
| 33 | MF | BUL | Tsvetomir Todorov (released) |
| 71 | MF | ESP | Hugo López (to (Israel) Ironi Ramat HaSharon) |
| 99 | FW | BUL | Martin Toshev (released) |
| — | GK | BUL | Ivan Karadzhov (to Beroe Stara Zagora) |

== B PFG ==
=== Bansko ===
In:

| No. | Pos. | Nation | Player |
|---|---|---|---|
| 5 | DF | BUL | Kristiyan Uzunov (from Oborishte) |
| 10 | FW | BUL | Veselin Stoykov (from (Kazakhstan) Caspiy) |
| 22 | MF | BUL | Miroslav Nikolov (Free agent) |

Out:

| No. | Pos. | Nation | Player |
|---|---|---|---|
| 5 | MF | BUL | Vasil Tudzharov (released) |
| 10 | FW | BUL | Nikolay Ivanov (released) |
| 22 | MF | BUL | Aleksandar Kehayov (released) |

=== Chavdar Etropole ===
In:

| No. | Pos. | Nation | Player |

Out:

| No. | Pos. | Nation | Player |

=== Kaliakra ===
In:

| No. | Pos. | Nation | Player |

Out:

| No. | Pos. | Nation | Player |
|---|---|---|---|
| 2 | MF | BUL | Nikolay Dimitrov (released) |
| 4 | DF | BUL | Ayan Irfan (released) |
| 10 | MF | BUL | Ivelin Kostov (released) |
| 12 | FW | BUL | Denis Nikolov (released) |
| 19 | FW | BUL | Ivan Tsachev (to Spartak Varna) |
| 22 | MF | BUL | Stanislav Stamatov (released) |
| 26 | DF | BUL | Aleksandar Sabev (released) |

=== Lyubimets 2007 ===
In:

| No. | Pos. | Nation | Player |

Out:

| No. | Pos. | Nation | Player |
|---|---|---|---|
| 10 | MF | BUL | Nikolay Pavlov (to Botev Plovdiv) |
| — | FW | BUL | Lyubomir Genchev (released) |

=== Neftochimic Burgas ===
In:

| No. | Pos. | Nation | Player |
|---|---|---|---|
| 5 | DF | BUL | Miroslav Enchev (from Beroe Stara Zagora) |
| 7 | MF | BUL | Hyusein Filipov (from Sliven) |
| 9 | FW | BUL | Vasil Kaloyanov (from Slavia Sofia) |
| 12 | GK | BUL | Evgeni Karamanov (from Sliven) |
| 13 | GK | BUL | Tsvetomir Tsankov (from Etar 1924) |
| 17 | FW | BUL | Yanaki Smirnov (from Spartak Varna) |
| 21 | MF | BUL | Stamen Angelov (from Cherno more Varna) |
| 22 | DF | BUL | Ivan Ivanov (from Sliven) |
| 27 | MF | BUL | Milen Gamakov (on loan from Chernomorets Burgas) |

Out:

| No. | Pos. | Nation | Player |
|---|---|---|---|
| 5 | DF | BUL | Rostislav Yankov (released) |
| 6 | DF | BUL | Velin Damyanov (to (Poland) Chrobry Głogów) |
| 7 | MF | BUL | Dimitar Blagov (released) |
| 8 | MF | BUL | Stanimir Andonov (released) |
| 13 | GK | BUL | Bozhidar Stoychev (loan return to CSKA Sofia) |
| 15 | FW | BUL | Petar Kolev (to Master Burgas) |
| 22 | MF | BUL | Vladimir Baharov (loan return to CSKA Sofia) |
| 27 | MF | BUL | Georgi Kaloyanov (to Master Burgas) |
| 90 | FW | BUL | Rumen Nikolov (to (Spain) CD Mijas) |
| — | GK | BUL | Georgi Stoyanov (to Master Burgas) |

=== Pirin Razlog ===
In:

| No. | Pos. | Nation | Player |
|---|---|---|---|
| 10 | FW | BUL | Todor Chavorski (on loan from Levski Sofia) |

Out:

| No. | Pos. | Nation | Player |

=== Rakovski 2011 ===
In:

| No. | Pos. | Nation | Player |
|---|---|---|---|
| 6 | DF | BUL | Radoslav Terziev (on loan from Botev Plovdiv) |
| 7 | MF | BUL | Lachezar Angelov (on loan from Botev Plovdiv) |
| 13 | MF | BUL | Hristian Kazakov (on loan from Botev Plovdiv) |
| 28 | MF | BUL | Lazar Marin (on loan from Botev Plovdiv) |
| 90 | FW | BUL | Petar Atanasov (on loan from Botev Plovdiv) |

Out:

| No. | Pos. | Nation | Player |
|---|---|---|---|
| 14 | MF | BUL | Filip Chipchev (released) |
| 17 | MF | BUL | Dobrin Orlovski (released) |

=== Septemvri Simitli ===
In:

| No. | Pos. | Nation | Player |

Out:

| No. | Pos. | Nation | Player |

=== Shumen 2010 ===
In:

| No. | Pos. | Nation | Player |

Out:

| No. | Pos. | Nation | Player |
|---|---|---|---|
| 1 | GK | BUL | Todor Todorov (released) |
| 6 | MF | BUL | Bozhidar Iliev (released) |
| 8 | MF | BUL | Petar Petrov (released) |
| 9 | FW | BUL | Zahari Dimitrov (released) |
| 14 | MF | BUL | Zhivko Gerchev (released) |
| 15 | MF | BUL | Mitko Mitkov (released) |
| 17 | MF | BUL | Bircent Karagaren (released) |
| 18 | FW | BUL | Nededin Ahmedov (released) |
| 19 | DF | BUL | Dimitar Vitanov (released) |
| 22 | DF | BUL | Maksim Nedev (released) |
| 23 | DF | BUL | Evgeni Zyumbyulev (released) |
| 24 | MF | SCO | Ross Chisholm (released) |
| 26 | DF | BUL | Yulian Zagorov (released) |
| 30 | MF | ITA | Emanuele Morini (released) |
| — | MF | BUL | Boris Markov (released) |
| — | DF | BUL | Trayan Georgiev (released) |
| — | FW | BUL | Deyan Yordanov (released) |

=== Spartak Pleven ===
In:

| No. | Pos. | Nation | Player |

Out:

| No. | Pos. | Nation | Player |
|---|---|---|---|
| 3 | DF | BUL | Marian Blazhev (released) |
| 6 | MF | BUL | Spas Milushev (released) |
| 8 | FW | BUL | Tsvetan Petrov (released) |
| 12 | GK | BUL | Angel Manolov (released) |
| 15 | MF | BUL | Tihomir Todorov (released) |
| 19 | DF | BUL | Toni Palikrushev (released) |

=== Spartak Varna ===
In:

| No. | Pos. | Nation | Player |
|---|---|---|---|
| 20 | MF | BUL | Dragomir Kazakov (Free agent) |
| 22 | MF | BUL | Ignat Damyanov (from Dobrudzha) |

Out:

| No. | Pos. | Nation | Player |
|---|---|---|---|
| 13 | MF | BUL | Vasko Boev (retired) |
| 16 | DF | BUL | Martin Dimov (to (Norway) Sandnessjøen IL) |
| 18 | FW | BUL | Erhan Mehmed (released) |
| 22 | MF | BUL | Beadir Beadirov (released) |
| 33 | FW | BUL | Yanaki Smirnov (to Neftochimic Burgas) |
| 89 | GK | BUL | Petar Stoev (released) |
| — | FW | BUL | Georgi Stanchev (released) |

=== Sliven 2000 ===
In:

| No. | Pos. | Nation | Player |

Out:

| No. | Pos. | Nation | Player |
|---|---|---|---|
| — | GK | BUL | Evgeni Karamanov (to Neftochimic Burgas) |
| — | MF | BUL | Hyusein Filipov (to Neftochimic Burgas) |
| — | DF | BUL | Ivan Ivanov (to Neftochimic Burgas) |

=== Svetkavitsa ===
In:

| No. | Pos. | Nation | Player |

Out:

| No. | Pos. | Nation | Player |

=== Vidima-Rakovski ===
In:

| No. | Pos. | Nation | Player |
|---|---|---|---|
| — | DF | BUL | Martin Vasilev (from CSKA Sofia) |

Out:

| No. | Pos. | Nation | Player |
|---|---|---|---|
| — | FW | BUL | Milen Zhelev (released) |
| — | MF | BUL | Ivan Ivanov (released) |
| — | MF | BUL | Simeon Mechev (released) |
