= FC Eurocollege Plovdiv =

Eurocollege
- Full name: Football Club Eurocollege
- Founded: 2006; 19 years ago
- Ground: Sports Complex Eurocollege, Orizari
- Capacity: 1000
- Manager: Yordan Harkov
- League: South-East Third League
- 2016–17: South-East Third League, 7th
Home colours	Away colours

FC Eurocollege (Bulgarian: ФК Евроколеж) is a Bulgarian association football club based in Plovdiv, currently playing in the South-East Third League, the third level of Bulgarian football.

== Current squad ==
As of 12 July 2017 Note: Flags indicate national team as defined under FIFA eligibility rules; some limited exceptions apply. Players may hold more than one non-FIFA nationality.

No.	Pos.	Nation	Player
—	GK	BUL	Rumen Tinkov
—	GK	BUL	Apostol Stoyanov
—	GK	BUL	Georgi Ivanov
—	GK	BUL	Ivan Geshev
—	DF	GRE	Nikos Thomopoulos
—	DF	BUL	Nikolay Bonchev
—	DF	BUL	Georgi Bachvarov
—	DF	BUL	Atanas Savov
—	DF	BUL	Kristiyan Moskov
—	DF	BUL	Ivan Atanasov
—	DF	BUL	Yordan Zharov
—	DF	BUL	Iliya Petrov
—	DF	BUL	Ivaylo Avramov
—	DF	BUL	Yordan Vranchev
—	MF	BUL	Hristo Yanchev

No.	Pos.	Nation	Player
—	MF	BUL	Dido Pavlov
—	MF	BUL	Sezgin Chetin
—	MF	BUL	Miroslav Karailiev
—	MF	BUL	Radi Trendafilov
—	MF	BUL	Nikolay Pavlov
—	MF	BUL	Valentin Tomov
—	MF	BUL	Vasil Gudzhev
—	MF	BUL	Peyo Batinov
—	FW	BUL	Petar Chelebiev
—	FW	BUL	Nikolay Nikolov
—	FW	BUL	Georgi Kurtev
—	FW	BUL	Stanimir Kovachev
—	FW	BUL	Serafim Mihaylov
—	FW	BUL	Etorul Celiktepe
