= Makendzhiev =

Makendzhiev (masculine, Bulgarian: Макенджиев) or Makendzhieva (feminine, Bulgarian: Макенджиева) is a Bulgarian surname. Notable people with the surname include:

- Blagoy Makendzhiev (born 1988), Bulgarian footballer
- Milcho Makendzhiev (born 1989), Bulgarian footballer
