= Milen Kikarin =

Bulgarian footballer

Personal information
- Full name: Milen Georgiev Kikarin
- Date of birth: 18 August 1992 (age 34)
- Place of birth: Bulgaria
- Height: 1.71 m (5 ft 7 in)
- Position: Left back

Team information
- Current team: Kostenets

Youth career
- CSKA Sofia

Senior career*
Years	Team	Apps	(Gls)
2010–2012	CSKA Sofia	0	(0)
2011–2012	→ Akademik Sofia (loan)	18	(0)
2012–2013	Pirin Gotse Delchev	0	(0)
2013	Vitosha Bistritsa	12	(1)
2014	Lyubimets 2007	13	(0)
2015	Minyor Pernik	14	(0)
2015–2016	CSKA Sofia	26	(0)
2016	Botev Plovdiv	6	(0)
2017–2018	CSKA 1948	11	(0)
2019–2020	Sportist Svoge	10	(0)
2023–	Kostenets		
- * Club domestic league appearances and goals as of 15 November 2021

Milen Kikarin (Bulgarian: Милен Кикарин; born 18 August 1992) is a Bulgarian footballer who plays as a left back for Kostenets.

== Career ==
On 17 June 2016 Kikarin joined Botev Plovdiv. On 30 July 2016 he made an official debut for Botev Plovdiv during the 1–1 draw with the local rivals Lokomotiv Plovdiv. He was released in January 2017.

On 14 July 2017, Kikarin signed with CSKA 1948.

== Honours ==
=== Club ===
CSKA Sofia

- Bulgarian Cup: 2015–16
