= Karamanov =

Karamanov is a surname. Notable people with the surname include:

- Aco Karamanov (1927-1944), Macedonian or Bulgarian poet and partisan
- Alemdar Karamanov (1934-2007), Russian-Ukrainian composer
- Evgeni Karamanov (born 1986), Bulgarian footballer
- Ivan Karamanov (born 1981), Bulgarian footballer

== See also ==
- 4274 Karamanov, a minor planet named in honour of Alemdar Karamanov
