= Rumen Tinkov =

Bulgarian footballer

Personal information
- Full name: Rumen Georgiev Tinkov
- Date of birth: 20 February 1987 (age 39)
- Place of birth: Plovdiv, Bulgaria
- Height: 1.91 m (6 ft 3 in)
- Position: Goalkeeper

Team information
- Current team: Eurocollege

Youth career
- 1997–2005: Spartak Plovdiv

Senior career*
Years	Team	Apps	(Gls)
2005–2007	Spartak Plovdiv	43	(0)
2007–2011	Lokomotiv Sofia	1	(0)
2011	Lyubimets 2007	1	(0)
2011–2012	Botev Plovdiv	0	(0)
2012–	Eurocollege	0	(0)
- * Club domestic league appearances and goals as of 17 June 2012

Rumen Tinkov (Bulgarian: Румен Тинков; born 20 February 1987 in Plovdiv) is a Bulgarian footballer who plays as a goalkeeper.

== Career ==
His first club was Spartak Plovdiv. Tinkov signed for Lokomotiv Sofia in early 2007 for a fee of €50,000 together with Ivaylo Dimitrov and Nikolay Pavlov.
