= Protasiewicz =

Protasiewicz (archaic feminine: Protasiewiczowa; archaic maiden surname: Protasiewiczówna; plural: Protasiewiczowie) is a Polish surname. Other forms of the name include Protasewicz, Protasevich, Protosevich, Protaszewicz and the Lithuanian name Protasevičius. Notable people with the name include:

- Michał Protasewicz (born 1985), Polish footballer
- Walerian Protasewicz (c. 1505–1579), bishop of Lutsk (1549–1555) and Vilnius (1555–1579)
- Jacek Protasiewicz (born 1967), Polish politician
- Janet Protasiewicz (born 1962), American judge
- Piotr Protasiewicz (born 1975), Polish speedway rider
- Mark Protosevich (born 1961), American screenwriter
- Mikhail Protasevich (born 1971), Belarusian sailor
- Roman Protasevich (born 1995), Belarusian blogger and political activist
