= Tomov =

Tomov or Tomow (Bulgarian: Томов) is a Bulgarian masculine surname, its feminine counterpart is Tomova or Tomowa. Notable people with the surname include:

- Aleksandar Tomov (wrestler) (born 1949), Bulgarian wrestler
- Aleksandar Tomov (politician) (born 1954), Bulgarian politician, economist and academic
- Anna Tomowa-Sintow (born 1941), Bulgarian soprano singer
- Lilyana Tomova (born 1946), Bulgarian sprinter
- Radina Tomova (born 2005), Bulgarian rhythmic gymnast
- Toma Tomov (born 1958), Bulgarian hurdler
- Valentin Tomov (born 1996), Bulgarian football player
- Viktoriya Tomova (born 1995), Bulgarian tennis player
- Yordan Tomov (1924–1998), Bulgarian football player and coach
