= Jasar Takak =

Dutch former professional footballer (born 1982)

Personal information
- Full name: Jasar Takak
- Date of birth: 4 March 1982 (age 44)
- Place of birth: 's-Hertogenbosch, Netherlands
- Height: 1.71 m (5 ft 7 1/2 in)
- Position: Midfielder

Youth career
- RKVV Sint-Michielsgestel
- 1993–2002: PSV

Senior career*
Years	Team	Apps	(Gls)
2002–2006	PSV	0	(0)
2003–2004	→ Zwolle (loan)	34	(8)
2004–2005	→ RKC Waalwijk (loan)	22	(4)
2005–2006	→ NEC (loan)	21	(2)
2007–2008	Vitesse	23	(1)
2009–2010	VVV-Venlo	8	(0)
2012	Cambuur	7	(0)
2012	Etar 1924	4	(0)
- * Club domestic league appearances and goals as of 27 November 2012 (UTC)

Jasar Takak (born 4 March 1982) is a Dutch former professional footballer who played as a midfielder.

== Career ==
=== Early career ===
Born in 's-Hertogenbosch by Assyrian parents originally from Turkey, Takak started his career with local side RKVV Sint-Michielsgestel. Takak was a big fan of PSV Eindhoven, and after impressing PSV scouts and staff on an arranged talent day, he joined their youth at age eleven.

=== PSV ===
In 2002, Takak was promoted to the PSV first team. Although being a part of the first-team squad, he never made any appearances for the first team. In September 2003, FC Zwolle signing him on a one-year loan deal after he had impressed in a friendly. In Zwolle, he established himself in the starting lineup and managed to score eight goals.

Despite impressing, it was decided that Takak would once again be loaned out for another season. Several clubs showed their interest, ultimately choosing to play for RKC Waalwijk. Once again, he was loaned out for one season.

In the summer of 2005, he returned to PSV, where his contract was terminated, effectively making him a free agent. After attracting the interest from several Dutch clubs, he signed a loan deal with NEC. With NEC, he established himself in the starting lineup, but after manager Cees Lok's dismissal, he lost his starting position and left NEC after only one season – without signing a new deal. His contract with PSV had, and Takak spent the 2006–07 season outside professional football, choosing instead to focus on other ventures.

=== Vitesse ===
After spending the season on the training ground of Roda JC, Takak signed a one-year contract with Vitesse. Although making some strong appearances, he was not offered a contract extension. Again, he received no considerable interest, but was eventually invited to train with Willem II, to keep up his fitness.

=== VVV-Venlo ===
In the 2009–10 pre-season, he was invited for training with VVV-Venlo where he impresses the staff. However, due to limited funds he was only offered an amateur-deal with VVV. He once again signed a one-year contract.

Takak was released at the end of the 2009–10 season.

=== SC Cambuur ===
In January 2012, after being a free agent for one and a half year, Takak signed with SC Cambuur until the end of the season.

=== Etar Veliko Tarnovo ===
He signed with Etar 1924 in 2012 after being approved by manager Serdar Dayat.
