= Rosen Vankov =

Bulgarian footballer

Personal information
- Full name: Rosen Ivanov Vankov
- Date of birth: 21 March 1985 (age 41)
- Place of birth: Bulgaria
- Height: 1.84 m (6 ft 1/2 in)
- Position: Defender

Team information
- Current team: OFC Etar
- Number: 4

Senior career*
| Years | Team | Apps | (Gls) |
| 2004–2009 | Etar 1924 | 62 | (1) |
| 2009–2012 | Botev Vratsa | 81 | (1) |
| 2013– | OFC Etar | 22 | (1) |
- * Club domestic league appearances and goals as of 1 August 2014

Rosen Vankov (Bulgarian: Росен Ванков; born 21 March 1985) is a Bulgarian football defender who currently plays for OFC Etar. He had previously played for Etar 1924 and Botev Vratsa.

== Career statistics ==
As of 1 August 2014

| Club | Season | League | | Cup | | Europe | | Total | |
| Club | Season | Apps | Goals | Apps | Goals | Apps | Goals | Apps | Goals |
|---|---|---|---|---|---|---|---|---|---|
| Etar 1924 | 2004–05 | 12 | 0 | 3 | 0 | – | – | 15 | 0 |
| Etar 1924 | 2005–06 | 9 | 0 | 0 | 0 | – | – | 9 | 0 |
| Etar 1924 | 2006–07 | 20 | 0 | 0 | 0 | – | – | 20 | 0 |
| Etar 1924 | 2007–08 | 8 | 1 | 1 | 0 | – | – | 9 | 1 |
| Etar 1924 | 2008–09 | 13 | 0 | 1 | 0 | – | – | 14 | 0 |
| Botev Vratsa | 2009–10 | 26 | 0 | 2 | 0 | – | – | 28 | 0 |
| Botev Vratsa | 2010–11 | 29 | 0 | 2 | 0 | – | – | 31 | 0 |
| Botev Vratsa | 2011–12 | 26 | 1 | 0 | 0 | – | – | 26 | 1 |
| OFC Etar | 2013–14 | 22 | 1 | 0 | 0 | – | – | 22 | 1 |
| OFC Etar | 2014–15 | 0 | 0 | 0 | 0 | – | – | 0 | 0 |
| Career totals | | 165 | 3 | 9 | 0 | 0 | 0 | 174 | 3 |
