= Nikolay Nikolaev (footballer, born 1992) =

Bulgarian footballer

Personal information
- Date of birth: 1 October 1992 (age 34)
- Place of birth: Bulgaria
- Position: Midfielder

Team information
- Current team: Lyubimets
- Number: 8

Senior career*
Years	Team	Apps	(Gls)
2012–2013	Etar 1924	11	(0)
2013–2016	Etar Veliko Tarnovo	64	(22)
2016–	Lyubimets	0	(0)
- * Club domestic league appearances and goals as of 21 March 2016

Nikolay Nikolaev (Bulgarian: Николай Николаев; born 1 October 1992) is a Bulgarian footballer who plays as a midfielder for Lyubimets.
