= Velin Kefalov =

Bulgarian footballer and manager

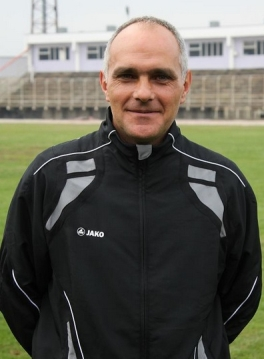

Personal information
- Full name: Velin Donchev Kefalov
- Date of birth: 18 September 1968 (age 58)
- Place of birth: Kazanlak, Bulgaria
- Height: 1.78 m (5 ft 10 in)
- Position: Defender

Senior career*
Years	Team	Apps	(Gls)
1985–1992	Rozova Dolina Kazanlak	200	(12)
1992–1996	Etar Veliko Tarnovo	115	(29)
1997–1998	Vorskla Poltava	17	(0)
1997	→ Vorskla-2 Poltava	1	(0)
1998–1999	Etar Veliko Tarnovo	7	(0)
1999–2000	Spartak Pleven	20	(0)
2000–2001	Etar Veliko Tarnovo	14	(2)

Managerial career
- 2007–2008: Etar 1924
- 2009–2010: Litex (assistant)
- 2010–2011: Etar 1924
- * Club domestic league appearances and goals

Velin Kefalov (Bulgarian: Велин Кефалов; born 18 September 1968) is a Bulgarian former football defender and manager. As of 2011, he was head coach of Etar Veliko Tarnovo,

== Career ==
He was born in Kazanlak and started his career with the local team Etar Veliko Tarnovo. In 1997, he signed a contract for one year with the team from Ukrainian Premier League Vorskla Poltava. In 1998 Kefalov returned to Bulgaria – to Etar Veliko Tarnovo.

== Managerial career ==
After completing his playing career Kefalov began a coaching job. At the beginning of the twenty-first century, Kefalov led Etar, and then became director of the Football School in Veliko Tarnovo. In the summer of 2009, he moved, at the invitation of coach Angel Chervenkov, to work as his assistant in Litex. His excellent training led the club to win the championship. In August 2010, Kefalov again took the position of head coach with Etar Veliko Tarnovo.
