= Ivan Ivanov (footballer, born 1989) =

Bulgarian footballer

Personal information
- Full name: Ivan Angelov Ivanov
- Date of birth: 8 December 1989 (age 36)
- Place of birth: Lukovit, Bulgaria
- Height: 1.77 m (5 ft 9 1/2 in)
- Position: Defender

Team information
- Current team: Spartak Pleven
- Number: 16

Senior career*
Years	Team	Apps	(Gls)
2009–2011	Akademik Sofia	57	(1)
2011	Sliven 2000	8	(0)
2012	Lyubimetz 2007	5	(0)
2012	Sliven 2000	7	(0)
2013	Neftochimic 1986	6	(0)
2013–2016	Botev Lukovit	76	(4)
2016–2025	Litex Lovech	214	(5)
2025–	Spartak Pleven	30	(0)
- * Club domestic league appearances and goals as of 11 June 2026

Ivan Angelov Ivanov (Bulgarian: Иван Ангелов Иванов; born 8 December 1989) is a Bulgarian footballer who currently plays as a defender for Spartak Pleven.
