= Radoslav Vasilev =

Bulgarian footballer

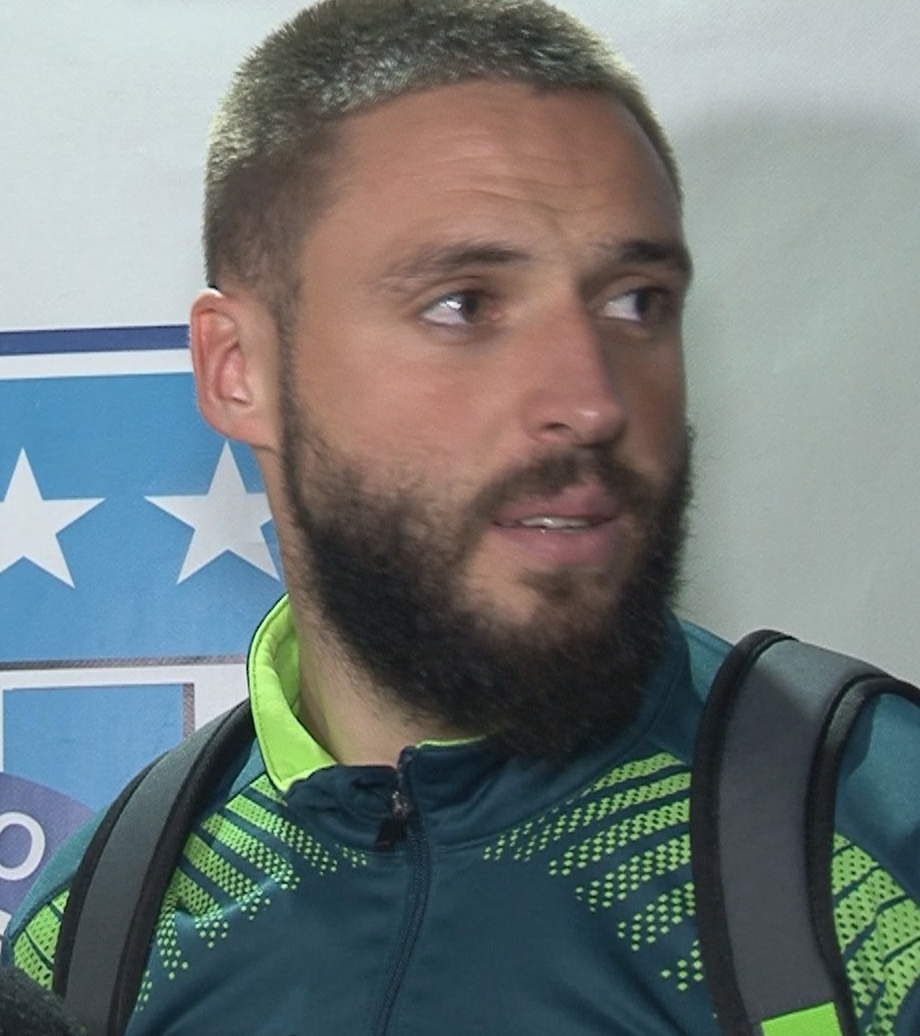

Personal information
- Full name: Radoslav Antonov Vasilev
- Date of birth: 12 October 1990 (age 36)
- Place of birth: Sofia, Bulgaria
- Height: 6 ft 2 in (1.88 m)
- Position: Striker

Team information
- Current team: Kostenets
- Number: 9

Youth career
- 1999–2007: Slavia Sofia
- 2007–2009: Reading

Senior career*
Years	Team	Apps	(Gls)
2009–2010	Reading	0	(0)
2010–2016	Slavia Sofia	79	(16)
2012	→ Lyubimets (loan)	8	(1)
2016–2017	Septemvri Sofia	10	(4)
2017	Alki Oroklini	14	(1)
2018–2019	Cherno More	43	(11)
2019–2020	Arda Kardzhali	31	(11)
2020–2021	Xanthi	0	(0)
2021	Sportist Svoge	2	(0)
2022–2023	Rilski Sportist	25	(12)
2023–2024	Kostenets	–	(–)
2024–2026	Kostinbrod	–	(–)

International career^{‡}
2008–2009	Bulgaria U19	4	(1)
2009–2011	Bulgaria U21	5	(0)
2015–2019	Bulgaria	6	(1)

Managerial career
- 2026: CSKA Sofia III (caretaker)
- * Club domestic league appearances and goals as of 13:42, 25 March 2024 (UTC) ‡ National team caps and goals as of 19 November 2018

Radoslav Vasilev (Bulgarian: Радослав Василев; born 12 October 1990) is a Bulgarian former professional footballer.

Vasilev began his career as a youth player for Slavia Sofia. In 2007, he moved to England, joining Reading. Vasilev spent two and a half years in the club's academy, but did not make any appearances for the first team. After leaving Reading at the end of the 2009–10 season, he re-joined Slavia. He spent six season with the club, but left in 2016 following a long absence due to injury. Vasilev signed for Septemvri Sofia in December 2016, then joined newly promoted Cypriot First Division club Alki Oroklini in June 2017, before joining Cherno More Varna in February 2018.

On 8 June 2015, Vasilev made his senior international debut for Bulgaria in a 4–0 friendly loss against Turkey.

== Career ==
=== Early career ===
Vasilev began his career with Slavia Sofia, where he played until he was 17.

On 12 December 2007, Vasilev joined Reading for an undisclosed fee, after a successful trial period with the club. Reading's Academy Recruitment officer, Steve Shorey (father of Nicky Shorey) explained his reasons for signing Vasilev: "He's different from what we've got at the same age. He's not just about brawn and pace, he's got football intelligence. He's a lovely size, around 6 ft 2 in, can use both feet."

Vasilev was released from Reading at the beginning of May 2010, alongside midfielders Mitchell Bryant and Oliver Bozanic.

=== Slavia Sofia ===
In July 2010, Vasilev returned to Bulgaria, signing a contract with his home club Slavia Sofia. He made his A Group debut during the 2010–11 season on August 21, 2010, in a 2–0 away win against Pirin Blagoevgrad.

Following a long absence due to injury, he left Slavia on 25 October 2016.

=== Septemvri Sofia ===
On 12 December 2016 Vasilev signed with Septemvri Sofia. After almost 2 years without playing he returned in play by debuting for Septemvri in the Vtora Liga on 27 February 2017 in a match against Pomorie won by Septemvri. He scored his first goal for the team on 1 April 2017 for the 5:0 win over Botev Galabovo. On 21 May 2017 he scored 2 goals for the team coming as a substitute in the match against Levski Karlovo.

=== Alki Oroklini ===
In June 2017, Vasilev joined Cypriot First Division club Alki Oroklini. On 19 August, he made his club debut in a 1–0 away victory over Ethnikos Achna in their first league game of the season. On 25 October 2017, he scored his first goal in a 3–2 defeat by Ermis Aradippou.

=== Cherno More ===
On 5 February 2018, Vasilev signed with Cherno More. On 17 February 2018, he made his debut for the club scoring the opener in a 1–4 home defeat by Beroe.

=== Arda Kardzhali ===
Vasilev joined Arda Kardzhali in June 2019.

Vasilev retired in the end of 2021 after long treated knee injury.

== International ==
In March 2015, Vasilev was called up to the Bulgarian national side for a Euro 2016 qualifier against Italy, but did not debut. He earned his first cap on 8 June 2015, after coming on as a substitute for Iliyan Mitsanski during the second half of the 0–4 loss against Turkey. He scored his first international goal on 9 September 2018, after coming on as a substitute against Norway in the UEFA Nations League.

=== International goals ===
Scores and results list Bulgaria's goal tally first.

No	Date	Venue	Opponent	Score	Result	Competition
1.	9 September 2018	Vasil Levski National Stadium, Sofia, Bulgaria	Norway	1–0	1–0	2018–19 UEFA Nations League C

== Career statistics ==
=== Club ===
As of 8 July 2020

Club performance			League		Cup		Continental		Other		Total	
Club	League	Season	Apps	Goals	Apps	Goals	Apps	Goals	Apps	Goals	Apps	Goals
England			League		FA Cup		Europe		Other (Note: Includes League Cup matches.)		Total	
Reading	Championship	2009–10	0	0	0	0	–		–		0	0
Bulgaria			League		Bulgarian Cup		Europe		Other (Note: Includes Bulgarian Supercup matches.)		Total	
Slavia Sofia	A Group	2010–11	6	0	0	0	—		—		6	0
Slavia Sofia	A Group	2011–12	10	2	0	0	—		—		10	2
Lyubimets 2007 (loan)	B Group	2012–13	8	1	0	0	—		—		8	1
Slavia Sofia	A Group	2012–13	12	1	4	0	—		—		16	1
Slavia Sofia	A Group	2013–14	26	3	2	0	—		—		28	3
Slavia Sofia	A Group	2014–15	25	10	3	0	—		—		28	10
Slavia Sofia	A Group	2015–16	0	0	0	0	—		—		0	0
Slavia Sofia	First League	2016–17	0	0	0	0	—		—		0	0
Slavia Sofia	Total		79	16	9	0	0	0	0	0	88	16
Septemvri Sofia	Second League	2016–17	11	4	0	0	—		—		11	4
Alki Oroklini	First Division	2017–18	14	1	0	0	—		—		14	1
Cherno More	First League	2017–18	16	6	0	0	—		—		16	6
Cherno More	First League	2018–19	27	5	2	0	—		—		29	5
Cherno More	Total		43	11	2	0	0	0	0	0	45	11
Arda Kardzhali	First League	2019–20	27	10	1	1	—		—		28	11
Career statistics			182	43	12	1	0	0	0	0	194	44

== Managerial statistics ==
As of 3 October 2026

Team	From	To	Record							
Team	From	To	G	W	D	L	Win %	GF	GA	GD
(Bulgaria) CSKA Sofia III (caretaker)	10 September 2026	3 October 2026	3	1	2	0	33.33	2	1	+1
Total			3	1	2	0	33.33	2	1	+1
