= Emil Petkov =

Bulgarian footballer

Personal information
- Full name: Emil Nikolov Petkov
- Date of birth: 16 July 1980 (age 46)
- Place of birth: Sofia, Bulgaria
- Height: 1.75 m (5 ft 9 in)
- Positions: Right wing back; wide midfielder

Youth career
- CSKA Sofia

Senior career*
Years	Team	Apps	(Gls)
1998–2000	Slanchev Bryag	28	(0)
2000–2004	Marek Dupnitsa	82	(3)
2005–2008	Rodopa Smolyan	93	(11)
2008–2012	Lyubimets 2007	98	(12)
2012–2013	Rakovski	21	(5)
2013	Oborishte	9	(1)
Total		331	(32)
- * Club domestic league appearances and goals

Emil Petkov (Bulgarian: Емил Петков; born 16 July 1980) is a former Bulgarian footballer, who played as a midfielder.

== Club statistics ==
As of 22 July 2012

Club	Season	League		Cup		Total	
Club	Season	Apps	Goals	Apps	Goals	Apps	Goals
Slanchev Bryag	1998–99	5	0	0	0	5	0
Slanchev Bryag	1999-00	23	0	0	0	23	0
Marek Dupnitsa	2000-01	22	0	0	0	22	0
Marek Dupnitsa	2001-02	26	0	5	0	31	0
Marek Dupnitsa	2002-03	13	0	0	0	13	0
Marek Dupnitsa	2003-04	14	3	2	0	16	3
Marek Dupnitsa	2004-05	7	0	2	0	9	0
Rodopa Smolyan	2004–05	15	3	0	0	15	3
Rodopa Smolyan	2005–06	26	1	0	0	26	1
Rodopa Smolyan	2006–07	27	1	1	0	28	1
Rodopa Smolyan	2007–08	25	6	1	0	26	6
Lyubimets 2007	2008-09	26	2	2	1	28	3
Lyubimets 2007	2009-10	26	5	0	0	26	5
Lyubimets 2007	2010-11	24	3	0	0	24	3
Lyubimets 2007	2011-12	22	2	0	0	22	2
Career totals		301	26	13	1	314	27
