= Filip Chipchev =

Bulgarian footballer

Personal information
- Full name: Filip Asenov Chipchev
- Date of birth: 15 July 1985 (age 41)
- Place of birth: Bulgaria
- Height: 1.84 m (6 ft 1/2 in)
- Position: Forward

Team information
- Current team: Oborishte
- Number: 23

Senior career*
Years	Team	Apps	(Gls)
2002–2004	Chernomorets Burgas	7	(0)
2004–2009	Rodopa Smolyan	81	(10)
2009–2011	Spartak Plovdiv	48	(11)
2011–2012	Lyubimets 2007	20	(1)
2012	Rakovski	8	(1)
2013–2015	Oborishte	0	(0)
- * Club domestic league appearances and goals as of 30 June 2013

Filip Chipchev (Bulgarian: Филип Чипчев; born 15 July 1985) is a Bulgarian footballer, currently playing as a forward for FC Oborishte.
