= Petar Dimitrov =

Bulgarian footballer

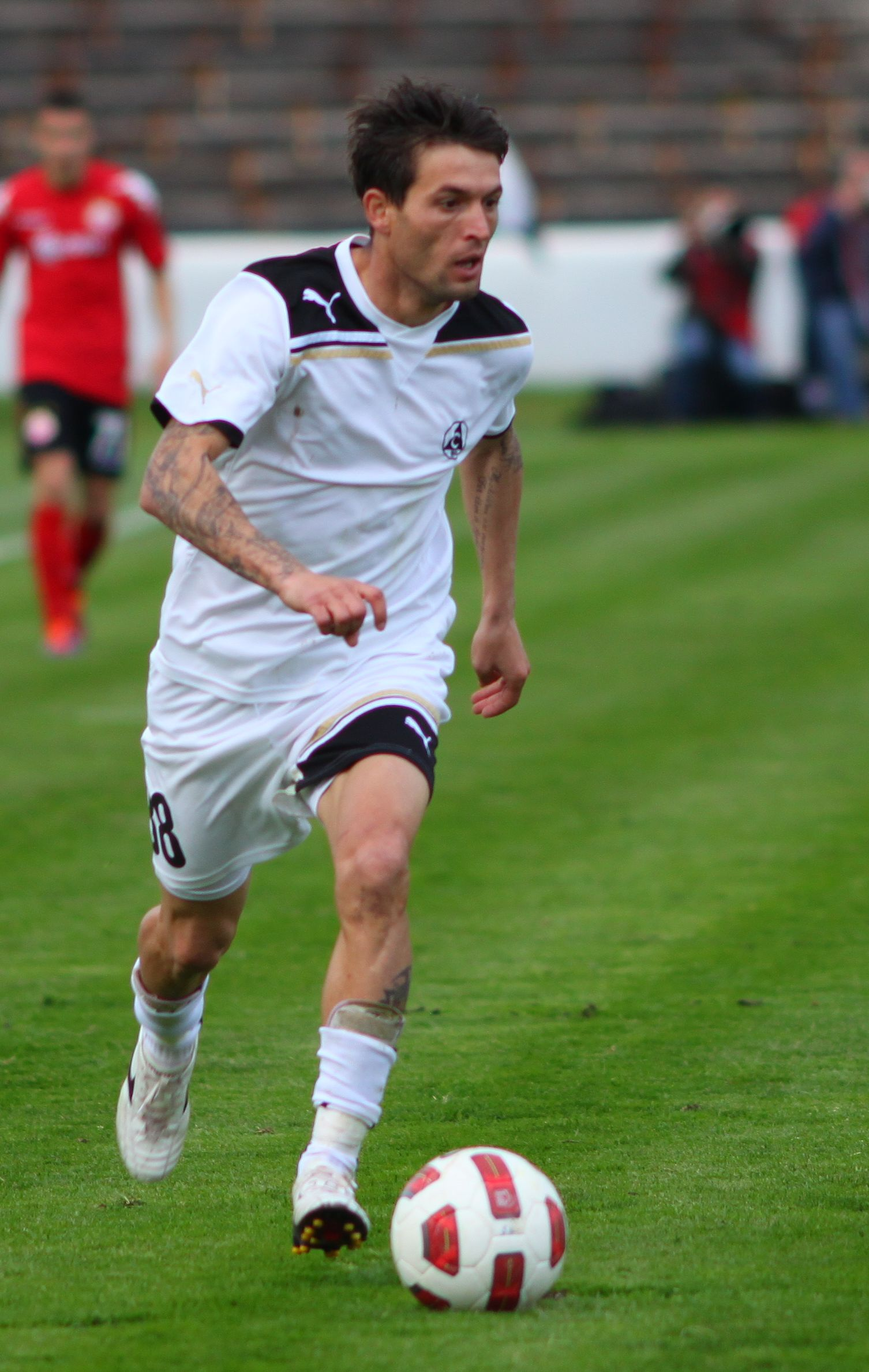

Personal information
- Full name: Petar Ognyanov Dimitrov
- Date of birth: 28 February 1982 (age 44)
- Place of birth: Sofia, Bulgaria
- Height: 1.70 m (5 ft 7 in)
- Positions: Winger; forward

Team information
- Current team: Kostenets

Senior career*
Years	Team	Apps	(Gls)
2002	Botev Vratsa	9	(1)
2003	Spartak Pleven	9	(0)
2003–2004	Belasitsa Petrich	3	(2)
2004–2005	CSKA Sofia	4	(0)
2006	Conegliano	11	(1)
2006–2008	Vihren Sandanski	40	(1)
2008–2009	Beroe	34	(7)
2010	Slavia Sofia	10	(0)
2010–2011	Beroe	37	(5)
2012–2013	Slavia Sofia	35	(6)
2013	Neftochimic 1986	17	(4)
2014	Lokomotiv Sofia	15	(0)
2015	Lokomotiv Mezdra	24	(15)
2016	Etar	31	(20)
2017	Kariana		
2017	Strumska Slava	7	(0)
2018	Balkan Botevgrad	13	(2)
2019	Levski 2007	14	(7)
2020	Lokomotiv Mezdra		
2021–2023	Kostinbrod	5	(3)
2023–	Kostenets		
- * Club domestic league appearances and goals as of 1 July 2019

Petar Dimitrov (Bulgarian: Петър Димитров; born 28 February 1982) is a Bulgarian professional footballer who plays as a winger or forward for Kostenets.

== Career ==
Dimitrov played for a few clubs, including CSKA Sofia, Belasitsa Petrich, Vihren Sandanski and Beroe Stara Zagora.

In August 2005, Dimitrov made appearances for CSKA Sofia in a 3–1 home loss against Liverpool in a Champions League qualification match and a 1–0 win over the same team in the return leg.

On 18 October 2009, Dimitrov scored the only goal for Beroe (in the 84th minute) to bring about a 1–0 away win against defending champions Levski Sofia, contributing to the sacking of their coach.

On 2 August 2013 he scored a legendary extra time side kick for Neftohimic Burgas' 3–2 victory over arch rivals Chernomorets.

On 15 January 2016 he signed for V Group team Etar Veliko Tarnovo after leaving Lokomotiv 2012 Mezdra as the team had financial trouble. He was leading goalscorer in B Group and the transfer was described as "transfer bomb". He left the team in January 2017.

In February 2017, Dimitrov joined Kariana Erden but was released in May.

On 20 June 2017, Dimitrov signed with the newly promoted to Second League club Strumska Slava. He was released at the end of November.

In the summer 2020, Dimitrov joined Lokomotiv Mezdra. During 2021, Dimitrov also played for OFK Kostinbrod.
