= OFC Kostenets =

- Full name: United Football Club Kostenets
- Founded: 1 June 2020; 5 years ago
- Ground: Benkovski Stadium, Kostenets
- Capacity: 2,500
- Manager: Nikolay Nikolov
- League: A RFG Sofia
- 2022–23: 4th
Home colours	Away colours

OFC Kostenets (Bulgarian: ОФК Костенец) is a Bulgarian association football club based in Kostenets, which competes in the A RFG Sofia, the forth division of the Bulgarian football league system. Fratria's home ground is the Benkovski Stadium, which has a capacity of 2,500 spectators.

== History ==
OFC Kostenets was established in 2020 and joined A RFG Sofia. In 2023 the team signed a sponsorship contract with 8888.bg and expressed a desire to get experienced players. They signed with Svetoslav Petrov, Yordan Varbanov, Milen Kikarin and Petar Dimitrov. In November 2023 they surprisingly signed with the ex-national star player Valeri Bojinov. They also announced the joining of another ex-national player Radoslav Vasilev. The team finished the first half of the season with 10 wins from 10 matches. In February 2024 they also got the captain of Pirin Razlog.

== Shirt and sponsor ==
Period	Kit manufacturer	Shirt partner
2020–2023	(Bulgaria) Jumper	None
2023–	(Bulgaria) Jumper	8888.bg

== Players ==
=== Current squad ===
As of 30 October 2023

Note: Flags indicate national team as defined under FIFA eligibility rules; some limited exceptions apply. Players may hold more than one non-FIFA nationality.

No.	Pos.	Nation	Player
—	GK	BUL	Kostadin Gotsev
—	DF	BUL	Nikolay Nikolov
—	DF	BUL	Dimitar Mavrodiev
—	DF	BUL	Angel Dimitrov
—	DF	BUL	Yordan Varbanov
—	DF	BUL	Svetoslav Kotlarov
—	DF	BUL	Georgi Kostov
—	MF	BUL	Violin Grigorov
—	MF	BUL	Milen Kikarin
—	MF	BUL	Nikolay Dyulgerov
—	MF	BUL	Nikolay Dimitrov

No.	Pos.	Nation	Player
—	MF	BUL	Petar Dimitrov
—	MF	BUL	Kristiyan Dimitrov
—	MF	BUL	Veselin Gelev
—	MF	BUL	Dimitar Kiranov
—	MF	BUL	George Nikolov
—	FW	BUL	Rumen Patarov
—	FW	BUL	Ventsislav Dimitrov
—	FW	BUL	Stanislav Dimitrov
—	FW	BUL	Radoslav Vasilev

== Notable players ==
Had international caps for their respective countries, held any club record, or had more than 100 league appearances. Players whose name is listed in bold represented their countries.

Bulgaria

- (Bulgaria) **Valeri Bojinov**
- (Bulgaria) **Svetoslav Petrov**
- (Bulgaria) **Radoslav Vasilev**

== Personnel ==
=== Managerial history ===
Dates	Name	Honours
2023–	(Bulgaria) Nikolay Nikolov	

== Seasons ==
=== Past seasons ===
Results of league and cup competitions by season
Season	League											Bulgarian Cup	Other competitions	Top goalscorer
Season	Division	Level	P	W	D	L	F	A	GD	Pts	Pos	Bulgarian Cup	Other competitions	Top goalscorer
2020–21	A RFG Sofia	4	16	13	2	1	47	9	+36	41	1st	DNQ		
2021–22	A RFG Sofia	4	21	13	4	4	54	25	+29	43	5th	DNQ		
2022–23	A RFG Sofia	4	26	19	3	4	91	33	+58	60	4th	DNQ		
2023–24	A RFG Sofia	4												

==== Key ====
- GS = Group stage
- QF = Quarter-finals
- SF = Semi-finals

Champions	Runners-up	Promoted	Relegated
