= Iliyan Iliev =

Bulgarian footballer

Personal information
- Full name: Iliyan Rumenov Iliev
- Date of birth: 6 November 1988 (age 38)
- Place of birth: Bulgaria
- Height: 1.74 m (5 ft 8 1/2 in)
- Position: Midfielder

Senior career*
Years	Team	Apps	(Gls)
2009–2010	Marek Dupnitsa	28	(1)
2011–2012	Minyor Pernik	43	(2)
2013	Montana	7	(0)
2014	Minyor Pernik	14	(2)
2014–2015	Septemvri Simitli	24	(0)
2015	Minyor Pernik		
2016	Botev Vratsa	20	(0)
2017–2021	Minyor Pernik	84	(5)
- * Club domestic league appearances and goals as of 15 March 2022

Iliyan Rumenov Iliev (Bulgarian: Илиян Руменов Илиев; born 6 November 1988) is a Bulgarian footballer who plays as a midfielder.

== Career ==
He made his debut in Marek Dupnitsa on 8 August in the team's 0–0 draw with Etar Veliko Tarnovo. On 22 August Iliev scored his first goal against Kom-Minyor. In the 2009–10 campaign he appeared in 28 matches and scored one goal.

On 20 January 2011, Iliev joined Minyor Pernik on a three-year contract, taking squad number 15.

On 4 January 2017, Iliev returned to Minyor Pernik.
