= Roger Risholt =

Norwegian footballer (born 1979)

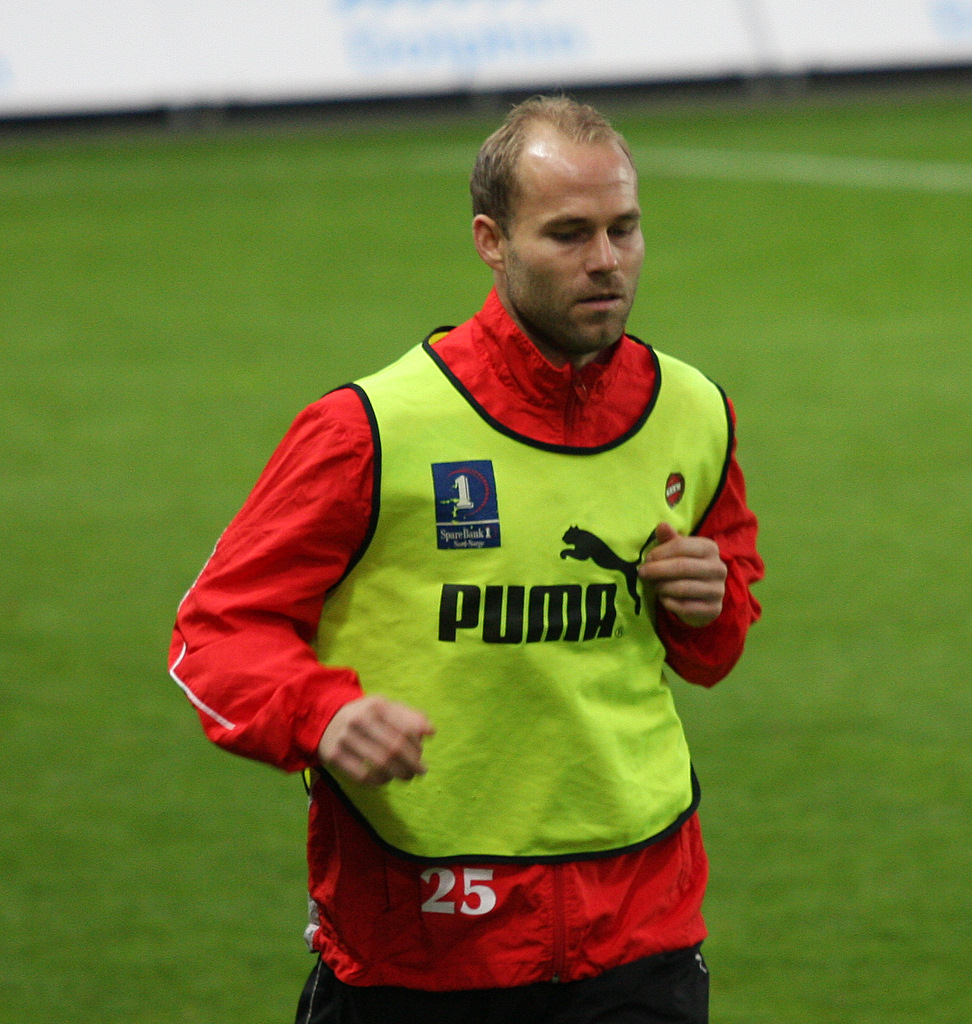

Personal information
- Date of birth: 10 April 1979 (age 47)
- Place of birth: Arendal, Norway
- Height: 1.79 m (5 ft 10 1/2 in)

Team information
- Current team: Arendal (manager)

Senior career*
Years	Team	Apps	(Gls)
- Arendal
- Jerv
- Øyestad
2000–2001	Start	16	(2)
2002–2005	Fredrikstad	83	(10)
2005–2006	AGF Aarhus	23	(1)
2006–2007	Häcken	21	(2)
2007–2008	Tromsø	18	(0)
2009–2010	Kongsvinger	43	(4)
2010	Fredrikstad	9	(1)
2011–2013	GIF Sundsvall	35	(2)
2013	Kristiansund	26	(0)
2014–2015	Sandefjord	40	(1)
2015–2016	Fredrikstad	18	(0)

International career
2005	Norway	3	(0)

Managerial career
- 2018: Arendal (interim)
- 2019–2020: Arendal (assistant)
- 2020–: Arendal
- * Club domestic league appearances and goals

Roger Risholt (born 10 April 1979) is a retired Norwegian football midfielder who is the current manager of Arendal. He is the twin brother of fellow footballer Kai Risholt.

== Playing career ==
Risholt started his career in local Arendal. He also played for Øyestad IF and FK Jerv before he became a part of the Start squad in 2000. With Start he took part in relegation from the Norwegian Premier League in 2000 and promotion the following season. In 2002, he moved to Fredrikstad, where he played an important part in helping them to successive promotion from the Norwegian Second Division to the Premier League. After the 2004 season with Fredrikstad he was voted player of the year by the supporters, and as a result of the good form he was displaying he was selected to be with the Norwegian national team during their winter tour in the Middle East where he won 3 caps, all as a substitute. Halfway through the 2005 season he left Fredrikstad for AGF Aarhus, where he played one season for AGF which ended with relegation. In the summer of 2006 he moved to BK Häcken, and once more experienced relegation. On 28 August 2007 Risholt signed for Tromsø IL, and in December 2008 he signed for Kongsvinger, where he would team up with his twin brother Kai.

On 31 August 2010, he signed for Fredrikstad.

He left Fredrikstad to join GIF Sundsvall in the winter 2011 before returning to Norway and Sandefjord. As captain he helped the team to promotion to the Norwegian Premier League in 2014. On the opening day of the Norwegian summer transfer window he decided to join Fredrikstad for the third time in his career. He came on a free transfer and signed a 1,5 year contract, finally retiring at the end of 2016.

== Managerial career ==
Risholt was made interim head coach of 2. divisjon club Arendal in July 2018, a position he held for one month. Ahead of the 2019 season, he returned to the club, now as an assistant coach. In September 2020, head coach Steinar Pedersen left the club, and Risholt was made interim head coach for a second time. One month later, he was appointed head coach on a permanent basis, signing a two-year contract.
