= Mehmet Mehmet =

Turkish footballer

Personal information
- Date of birth: 23 December 1985 (age 40)
- Place of birth: Gabrovo, Bulgaria
- Height: 1.68 m (5 ft 6 in)
- Position: Midfielder

Senior career*
Years	Team	Apps	(Gls)
2003–2005	Falkenbergs FF	20	(0)
2006–2008	Varbergs BoIS	20	(5)
2009–2010	IK Sleipner	30	(4)
2010	UMF Njarðvíkur	7	(0)
2011–2012	IF Sylvia	25	(1)
2013-2016	Etar 1924	5	(1)
- * Club domestic league appearances and goals as of 7 May 2013

Mehmet Mehmet is a Turkish footballer who plays as a midfielder.

== Career ==
Born in London, United Kingdom, Mehmet arrived in Cyprus at the age of 16. His footballing career began at Lapethos SK.

In 2010, Mehmet joined Bulgariaic side UMF Njarðvíkur.

In January 2013, Mehmet signed with Etar 1924 in Bulgaria on a six-month deal. He made his league debut on 9 March in a 1–0 away win over Cherno More, coming on as a second-half substitute. Just four minutes after coming off the bench, Mehmet scored the only goal.
