= Miroslav Antonov =

Bulgarian footballer

Miroslav Antonov Мирослав Антонов
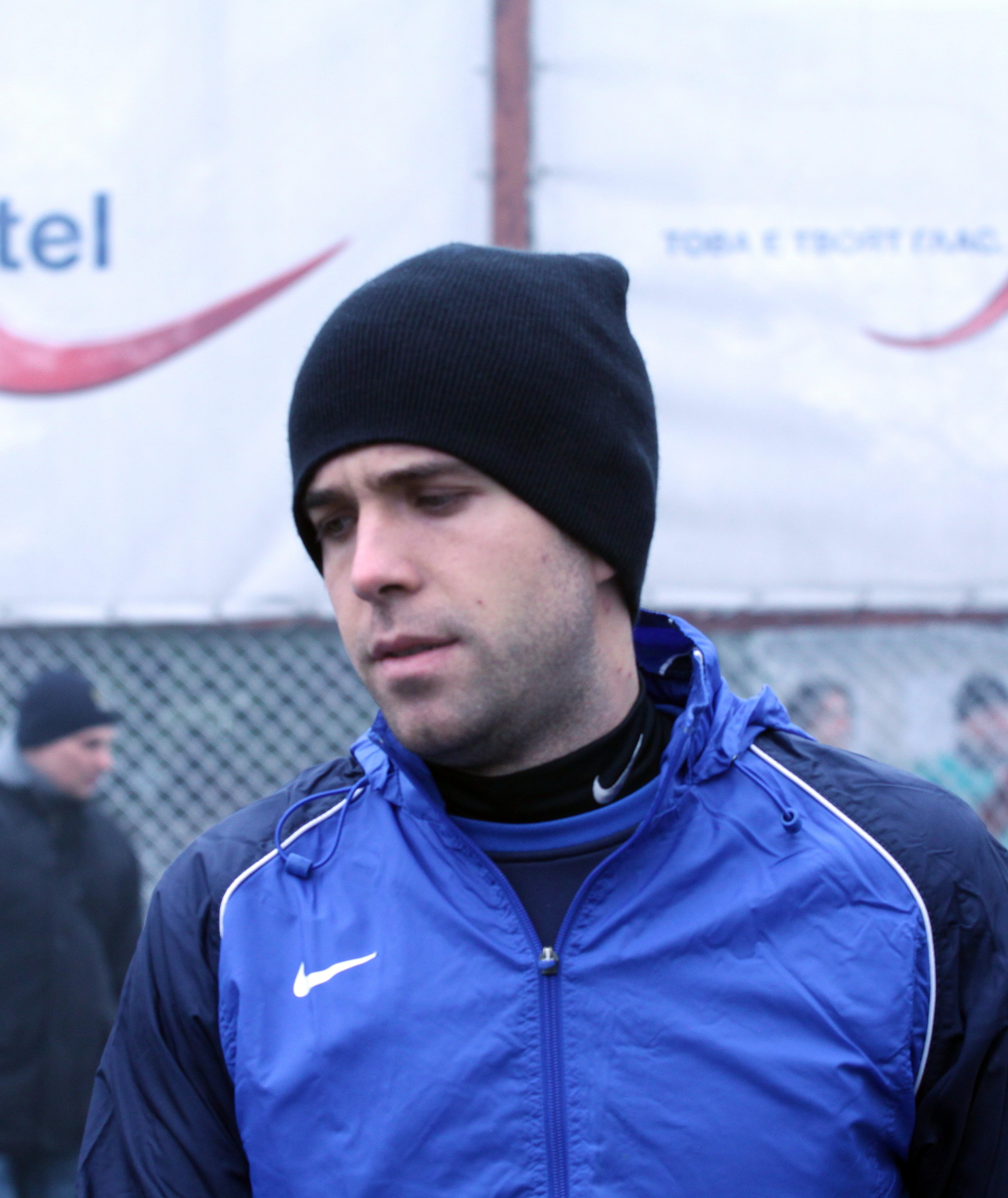

Personal information
- Full name: Miroslav Budinov Antonov
- Date of birth: 10 March 1986 (age 40)
- Place of birth: Montana, Bulgaria
- Height: 1.90 m (6 ft 3 in)
- Position: Forward

Team information
- Current team: Union Unis Gschwandt

Youth career
- Montana

Senior career*
Years	Team	Apps	(Gls)
2005–2006	Minyor BD	25	(10)
2006–2008	Montana	42	(23)
2008–2009	Sportist Svoge	44	(25)
2010	Levski Sofia	13	(4)
2010	→ Montana (loan)	17	(9)
2011–2012	Ludogorets Razgrad	15	(8)
2012	→ Montana (loan)	28	(13)
2013	Slavia Sofia	8	(2)
2013	Montana	12	(3)
2014	Maccabi Yavne	18	(5)
2014–2015	Montana	28	(17)
2015–2016	Maccabi Yavne	35	(16)
2016–2017	Hapoel Bnei Lod	12	(4)
2017	Hapoel Ramat HaSharon	19	(5)
2017–2019	Montana	40	(5)
2020–	Aiolikos		
- * Club domestic league appearances and goals as of 12 December 2019

Miroslav Antonov (Bulgarian: Мирослав Антонов; born 10 March 1986) is a Bulgarian footballer who currently plays as a forward for Union Unis Gschwandt. In 2024 he helped FC Munderfing staying in Landesliga West.

== Career ==
Antonov had previously played for Minyor Bobov dol and Montana.

=== Sportist Svoge ===
In summer 2008, he signed with Sportist Svoge. In the 2008–09 season, Antonov helped the team with his goals gain promotion to the first division in Bulgaria. He scored 15 goals in 29 matches.

In the first half of the next season he earned 15 appearances playing in the A PFG, scoring five goals.

=== Levski Sofia ===
On 4 January 2010, Levski Sofia signed Antonov on a three-year deal for € 50 000. He chose to wear the kit number 19. On 10 February 2010, Antonov scored his first goal for Levski in the 1:0 win against Belarusian side Dinamo Minsk in a friendly match.

Antonov made his official debut for Levski on 7 March 2010 against Minyor Pernik. The result of the match was 3–1 for Levski.

In the 2009–10 season, after couple of bad games and results, Levski however achieved qualification for UEFA Europa League becoming 3rd in the final ranking.

==== Montana (loan) ====
On 13 July 2010, Antonov was sent on loan to his former club PFC Montana.

On 15 January 2014 moved to Maccabi Yavne from the Israeli National League 2.

=== Montana ===
On 17 July 2017, Antonov signed a 1-year contract with his hometown club Montana.

=== Aiolikos ===
At the end of January 2020, Antonov moved to Greece where he joined Aiolikos in the Gamma Ethniki. He played two games before he got injured and didn't play again until the summer 2020, also due to the COVID-19 pandemic.

== Playing style ==
A tall and physically imposing forward with a good heading ability, Antonov has been likened to Georgi Chilikov.
