= Tsvetelin Tonev =

Bulgarian footballer

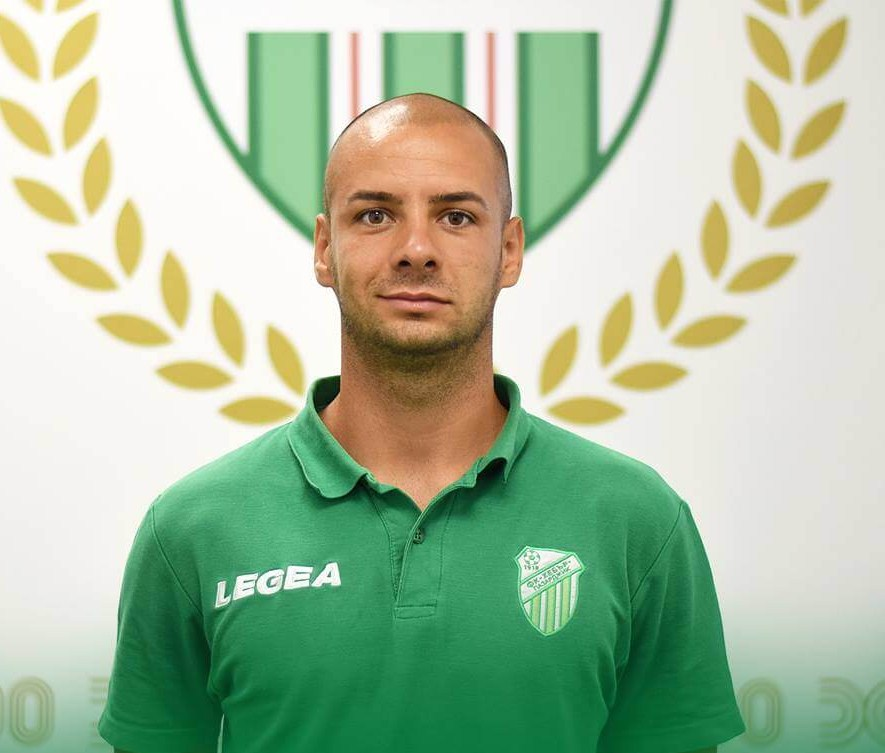
- Tonev in Hebar's 2018–2019 season jersey

Personal information
- Full name: Tsvetelin Yordanov Tonev
- Date of birth: 3 January 1992 (age 34)
- Place of birth: Plovdiv, Bulgaria
- Height: 1.70 m (5 ft 7 in)
- Position: Goalkeeper

Team information
- Current team: Trakite 2007 Skutare

Youth career
- Botev Plovdiv

Senior career*
Years	Team	Apps	(Gls)
2009–2010	Botev Plovdiv	2	(0)
2011–2014	Levski Sofia	1	(0)
2013	→ Botev Vratsa (loan)	9	(0)
2014	→ Montana (loan)	13	(0)
2014	Rakovski	13	(1)
2015	Botev Vratsa	11	(1)
2015–2016	OJC Rosmalen	19	(0)
2017–2022	Hebar	138	(11)
2023	Spartak Plovdiv		
2024–	Trakite 2007 Skutare		

International career
- Bulgaria U14

Managerial career
- 2024–: Trakite 2007 Skutare (set 2011–2012)
- 2025–: Trakite 2007 Skutare (boss)
- * Club domestic league appearances and goals as of 28 February 2023

Tsvetelin Yordanov Tonev (Bulgarian: Цветелин Йорданов Тонев; born 3 January 1992 in Plovdiv) is a Bulgarian footballer who currently plays as a goalkeeper for Trakite 2007 Skutare

== Career ==
=== Botev Plovdiv ===
Tonev is a youth player of Botev Plovdiv. On 22 August 2009, he made his first team debut against OFC Sliven 2000 on 22 August, coming on as an 80th-minute substitute in the 3–0 loss.

=== Levski Sofia ===
In 2011 Tonev joined Levski Sofia. He make him team debut against Lokomotiv Plovdiv on 06.05.12, coming on as an 85th-minute substitute in the 3–2 loss. He make his debut in Europa League as a substitute in 2nd match of Levski in 2nd qualification round.

On 11 January 2013 he was sent on loan to Botev Vratsa until rest of the season. Him loan ended after he broke a leg on match day.

Botev Vratsa (loan)

Montana (loan)

Rakovski

Botev Vratsa

Rosmalen

Hebar

Spartak Plovdiv

Trakite 2007 Skutare
