= Jacques Fey =

French footballer (born 1989)

Personal information
- Date of birth: 20 June 1989 (age 37)
- Place of birth: Longjumeau, France
- Position: Midfielder

Senior career*
Years	Team	Apps	(Gls)
2007–2008	US Palaiseau		
2008–2009	Bastia B		
2009–2010	Louhans-Cuiseaux	35	(1)
2010–2011	Viry-Châtillon	33	(3)
2012	Consolat	16	(2)
2012–2013	Etar 1924	11	(0)
- * Club domestic league appearances and goals

Jacques Fey (born 20 June 1989) is a French former professional footballer who played as a midfielder. He appeared in the Bulgarian A PFG for Etar 1924.
