= Kai Risholt =

Norwegian footballer (born 1979)

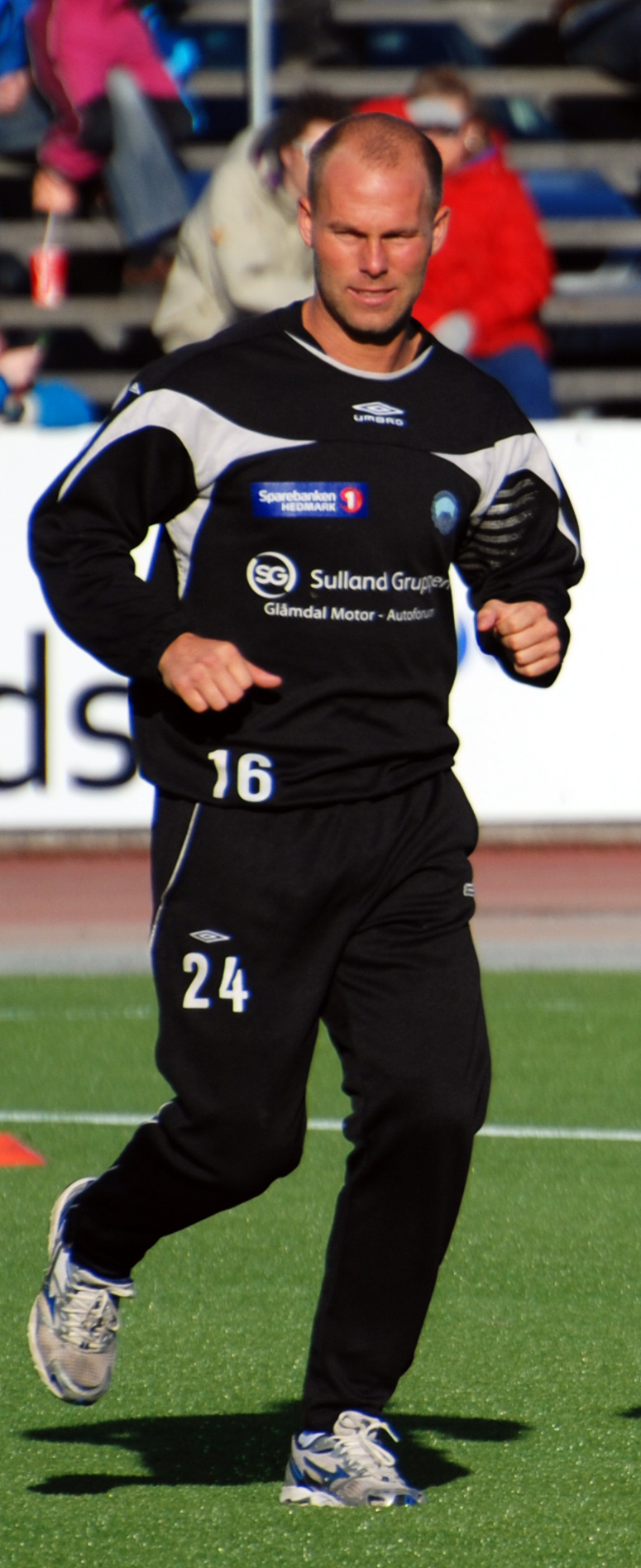

Personal information
- Date of birth: 10 April 1979 (age 47)
- Place of birth: Arendal, Norway
- Height: 1.76 m (5 ft 9 1/2 in)
- Positions: Defender; forward

Team information
- Current team: Hisøy

Youth career
- 1985–1990: ABK
- 1991–1995: Øyestad

Senior career*
| Years | Team | Apps | (Gls) |
| 1996 | Øyestad | | (12) |
| 1997–1998 | Jerv | | (14) |
| 1999 | Øyestad | | (15) |
| 2000–2001 | Eik-Tønsberg | | (14) |
| 2002 | Tollnes | 19 | (2) |
| 2003 | Ørn-Horten | 26 | (10) |
| 2004–2005 | Start | 30 | (3) |
| 2005–2007 | Hønefoss | 55 | (16) |
| 2008 | Sogndal | 20 | (8) |
| 2009–2010 | Kongsvinger | 55 | (10) |
| 2011–2012 | Bryne | 53 | (17) |
| 2013 | Etar 1924 | 11 | (1) |
| 2013 | Arendal | 4 | (1) |
| 2013 | Balzan | 0 | (0) |
| 2014 | Zejtun | 1 | (0) |
| 2014 | Fløy | ? | (?) |
| 2015 | Arendal | ? | (?) |
| 2018– | Hisøy | | |
- * Club domestic league appearances and goals as of 20:09, 7 May 2013 (UTC)

Kai Risholt (born 10 April 1979) is a Norwegian footballer, who plays for Arendal Fotball. He has previously played 32 matches and scored 3 goals in Tippeligaen for Start and Kongsvinger, and has played for numerous clubs in the Norwegian First Division as well as the Bulgarian A PFG side Etar 1924. Risholt has primarily played as a striker during his career, but has also played as a centre back. He is the twin brother of Roger Risholt.

== Career ==
Risholt was born in Arendal Municipality and is the twin brother of Roger. The two brothers played for the same teams until 1998, and they spent time with the local teams Arendal, Øyestad and Jerv. Risholt transferred to Eik-Tønsberg in 2000 and played for the team for two seasons, before he signed for Tollnes ahead of the 2002 season. At Tollnes, he was going to be used as a centre back despite having played primarily as a striker in his early years.

Risholt joined Ørn-Horten in 2003, where he teamed up with his former teammate from Jerv and Eik, Glenn Andersen. Risholt stayed at Ørn-Horten for one season, where he scored 10 goals and was the team's top goalscorer, before he joined Start ahead of the 2004 season, signing a two-year contract with the club. He was a part of the Start-team that won promotion to Tippeligaen in 2004 and won silver in the 2005 Tippeligaen, but was the fifth-choice striker and played a total of 11 minutes in the 2005 season. Risholt scored the winning goal in the 2–1 victory Aalesund on 16 June 2005, but did not get a new contract with Start and decided to join Hønefoss in August 2006.

After a severe concussion in a pre-season friendly against Odd Grenland on 9 February 2006, Risholt could not sleep for 22 days. He received much attention when he talked about his insomnia, and was invited as a guest at Fredrik Skavlan's talk-show Først & sist. In April 2006, Risholt said he was cured from the insomnia, and that the only thing preventing him from playing football was a knee injury.

Risholt broke his contract with Hønefoss in October 2007, and signed with Sogndal ahead of the 2008 season, where he was the top goalscorer with 12 goals. He left the club after one season as they did not want to renew his contract. Risholt joined Kongsvinger in 2009, where he played together with his brother Roger for the first time in 10 years, and the brothers were valuable contributors to the club's promotion to Tippeligaen.

Risholt made 28 appearances, 17 as a substitute, and scored 2 goals for Kongsvinger in the 2010 Tippeligaen, when the team was relegated. Risholt was frustrated about limited playing-time, and left the club after the season and signed a two-year contract with Bryne.

Risholt was, with his seven goals, the top goalscorer for Bryne in the 2012 season and was voted player of the season by Bryne's supporters. His contract was however not renewed by the club, and Risholt joined Bulgarian club Etar 1924 on a short-term contract in January 2013. He made his debut on 2 March 2013, after coming on as a late substitute in the 2–1 home win over PFC Montana and netted his first goal on 30 March 2013, in the 2–2 away draw with PFC Pirin Gotse Delchev. Risholt played a total of 12 matches for Etar 1924 when the team was relegated from the A PFG, and left the club after the season.

In 2013 to 2014 he travelled to Malta and played for 3 teams there during his stay, during his stay he played for Balzan, Zejtun and Tarixen. Before joining Flekkerøy IL.

After the 2014 season he went from Flekkerøy IL to Arendal Fotball.

== Career statistics ==
As of 22 February 2013

| Season | Club | Division | League | | Cup | | Total | |
| Season | Club | Division | Apps | Goals | Apps | Goals | Apps | Goals |
|---|---|---|---|---|---|---|---|---|
| 2002 | Tollnes | Adeccoligaen | 19 | 2 | 0 | 0 | 19 | 2 |
| 2003 | Ørn-Horten | Adeccoligaen | 26 | 10 | 4 | 1 | 30 | 11 |
| 2004 | Start | Adeccoligaen | 27 | 2 | 2 | 5 | 29 | 7 |
| 2005 | Start | Tippeligaen | 3 | 1 | 2 | 0 | 5 | 1 |
| 2005 | Hønefoss | Adeccoligaen | 8 | 1 | 1 | 0 | 9 | 1 |
| 2006 | Hønefoss | Adeccoligaen | 24 | 8 | 0 | 0 | 24 | 8 |
| 2007 | Hønefoss | Adeccoligaen | 22 | 7 | 0 | 0 | 22 | 7 |
| 2008 | Sogndal | Adeccoligaen | 20 | 8 | 3 | 4 | 23 | 12 |
| 2009 | Kongsvinger | Adeccoligaen | 27 | 8 | 1 | 0 | 28 | 8 |
| 2010 | Kongsvinger | Tippeligaen | 28 | 2 | 4 | 3 | 32 | 5 |
| 2011 | Bryne | Adeccoligaen | 27 | 10 | 1 | 0 | 28 | 10 |
| 2012 | Bryne | Adeccoligaen | 26 | 7 | 2 | 0 | 28 | 7 |
| Career Total | | | 257 | 66 | 20 | 13 | 277 | 79 |
