= Serdar Dayat =

Turkish football manager

Personal information
- Date of birth: 30 May 1969 (age 57)
- Place of birth: Istanbul, Turkey

Managerial career
- Years: Team
- 2001–2002: SV 1975 Munich
- 2002–2003: TSG Graefelfing
- 2003–2004: SC Fürstenfeldbruck
- 2012–2013: FC Etar 1924
- 2013: Denizlispor
- 2018: Kristianstad FC
- 2018–2019: Türkspor Augsburg
- 2021: Türkgücü München

Serdar Dayat is a Turkish football manager, who last managed Türkgücü München.

He trained in German Sports University Cologne and has experience as the assistant coach of Thomas Doll, Ersun Yanal, Vladimir Petkovic, and Werner Lorant and as the head coach of Turkish, German, Bulgarian, and Swedish clubs. Dayat speaks German, English, Turkish, and French. Along with Mustafa Denizli, Şenol Güneş, Fatih Terim, Bülent Uygun, Oğuz Çetin, Güvenç Kurtar, Rasim Kara, Bülent Korkmaz, and Tayfun Korkut, Serdar Dayat is one of the few Turkish managers who has worked in a foreign country as a head coach. He holds a UEFA Pro License.
