= Sławomir Cienciała =

Polish footballer

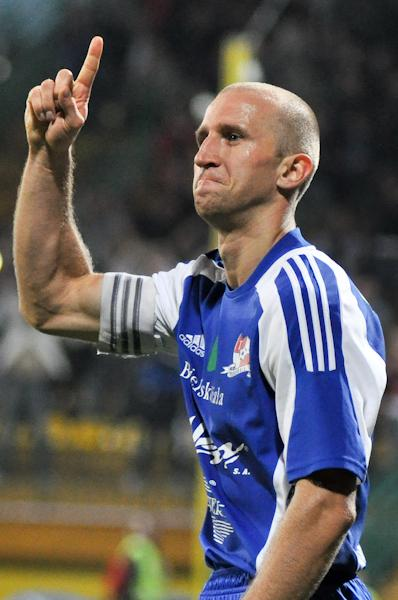

Personal information
- Full name: Sławomir Cienciała
- Date of birth: 19 March 1983 (age 43)
- Place of birth: Cieszyn, Poland
- Height: 1.83 m (6 ft 0 in)
- Position: Right-back

Youth career
- Beskid Skoczów

Senior career*
Years	Team	Apps	(Gls)
1998–2003	Beskid Skoczów		
2004–2012	Podbeskidzie Bielsko-Biała	169	(7)
2005–2006	→ Beskid Skoczów (loan)		
2013	Etar 1924	8	(2)
2013	Odra Opole	10	(0)
2014	Arka Gdynia	7	(0)
2014–2015	Flota Świnoujście	5	(2)
2016	Kuźnia Ustroń		
2016–2017	Podbeskidzie II		
- * Club domestic league appearances and goals

Sławomir Cienciała (born 19 March 1983 in Cieszyn) is a Polish former professional footballer who played as a right-back.
