= Nikolay Pavlov (footballer) =

Bulgarian footballer

Personal information
- Full name: Nikolay Andreev Pavlov
- Date of birth: 12 November 1987 (age 39)
- Place of birth: Plovdiv, Bulgaria
- Height: 1.90 m (6 ft 3 in)
- Position: Midfielder

Youth career
- 1995–2005: Spartak Plovdiv

Senior career*
Years	Team	Apps	(Gls)
2006–2007	Spartak Plovdiv	22	(7)
2007–2010	Lokomotiv Sofia	0	(0)
2011	Brestnik 1948	11	(0)
2011–2012	Lyubimets	36	(20)
2013–2014	Botev Plovdiv	8	(0)
2013	→ Chernomorets Burgas (loan)	13	(2)
2014	→ Rakovski (loan)	13	(3)
2014–2016	FC Eurocollege	54	(13)
2016–2017	Maritsa Plovdiv	29	(10)
2017–2018	FC Eurocollege	?	(?)
- * Club domestic league appearances and goals as of 1 June 2018

Nikolay Pavlov (Bulgarian: Николай Павлов; born 12 November 1987, in Plovdiv) is a Bulgarian footballer who plays as a midfielder and forward.

== Career ==
Born in Plovdiv, Pavlov started his career with local side Spartak Plovdiv. Because of his good displays he caught eye of Lokomotiv Sofia scouts and signed for the club in June 2007 for fee of €50 000 together with Ivaylo Dimitrov and Rumen Tinkov.

After a match in UEFA Cup qualification against Borac Cacak on August 14, 2008, Pavlov was tested positive for testosterone. Although he was substitute who did not play in that match, he was suspended from all official football competitions for a period of two years by UEFA.

In June 2011, it was officially announced that Pavlov had signed a contract with Lyubimetz 2007. He spent successful one and a half years at the club, playing a total of 36 games in the second division, scoring 20 goals. Pavlov finished the 2011–12 season as the league's top goal scorer with 13 goals.

On 5 January 2013, Pavlov joined Botev Plovdiv on a three-year contract.
