= Milcho Makendzhiev =

Bulgarian footballer

Personal information
- Date of birth: 31 October 1989 (age 37)
- Place of birth: Petrich, Bulgaria
- Height: 1.91 m (6 ft 3 in)
- Position: Defender

Youth career
- Pirin 2001
- 2007: Ascoli
- 2008: Gavorrano

Senior career*
| Years | Team | Apps | (Gls) |
| 2008–2009 | Lokomotiv Mezdra | 21 | (1) |
| 2010 | Nesebar | 18 | (0) |
| 2011 | Sliven 2000 | 8 | (0) |
| 2011–2012 | Etar 1924 | 26 | (0) |
| 2014 | Vihren Sandanski | 9 | (0) |
| 2015 | Etar Veliko Tarnovo | 10 | (2) |
| 2015–2018 | Belasitsa Petrich | ? | (?) |

International career
| 2008 | Bulgaria U19 | 3 | (0) |
| 2008–2009 | Bulgaria U21 | 3 | (0) |
- * Club domestic league appearances and goals

Milcho Makendzhiev (Bulgarian: Милчо Макенджиев; born 31 October 1989) is a Bulgarian former professional footballer who played as a defender.

== Career ==
In August 2007, Ascoli Calcio 1898 officially invited Makendzhiev to join the training sessions of their junior team and he went to Italy. In 2008 for four months he played and in junior team of U.S.D. Gavorrano. In June 2008 Makendzhiev returned to Bulgaria and signed his first professional contract with Lokomotiv Mezdra. In his first season in Lokomotiv, Makendzhiev earned 14 appearances playing in A Group, scoring one goal.

From 2008 Makendzhiev played for Bulgaria national under-19 football team. He was part of the Bulgarian team that played at the 2008 UEFA European Under-19 Football Championship in the Czech Republic.

From August 2008 he is a member of Bulgaria U21.
