= Patrik Rikama-Hinnenberg =

Finnish footballer (born 1983)

Patrik Rikama
Personal information
- Full name: Patrik Rikama-Hinnenberg
- Date of birth: 8 February 1983 (age 43)
- Place of birth: Vantaa, Finland
- Height: 1.77 m (5 ft 9 1/2 in)
- Position: Right-back

Youth career
- VJS
- HJK

Senior career*
Years	Team	Apps	(Gls)
2004	HJK	1	(0)
2005–2006	Atlantis FC	42	(0)
2007–2010	IFK Mariehamn	71	(1)
2011–2012	GIF Sundsvall	29	(0)
2013	Etar 1924	7	(0)
2013	Haka	3	(0)
- * Club domestic league appearances and goals as of 20:08, 7 May 2013 (UTC)

Patrik Rikama-Hinnenberg (born 8 February 1983) is a Finnish football player. He formerly played for IFK Mariehamn, HJK, Atlantis FC, GIF Sundsvall and Etar 1924.

== Career statistics ==
As of 21 May 2024

Appearances and goals by club, season and competition
Club	Season	League			Cup (Note: Includes Suomen Cup and Svenska Cupen)		Other		Total	
Club	Season	Division	Apps	Goals	Apps	Goals	Apps	Goals	Apps	Goals
HJK	2004	Veikkausliiga	1	0	0	0	–		1	0
Atlantis	2005	Ykkönen	21	0	0	0	–		21	0
Atlantis	2006	Ykkönen	21	0	0	0	–		21	0
Atlantis	Total		42	0	0	0	–	–	42	0
IFK Mariehamn	2007	Veikkausliiga	14	0	0	0	–		14	0
IFK Mariehamn	2008	Veikkausliiga	11	0	0	0	–		11	0
IFK Mariehamn	2009	Veikkausliiga	23	1	0	0	8 (Note: Includes Finnish League Cup)	0	31	1
IFK Mariehamn	2010	Veikkausliiga	23	0	3	0	–		26	0
IFK Mariehamn	Total		71	1	3	0	8	0	82	1
GIF Sundsvall	2011	Superettan	23	0	0	0	–		23	0
GIF Sundsvall	2012	Allsvenskan	6	0	1	0	–		7	0
GIF Sundsvall	Total		29	0	1	0	–	–	30	0
Etar 1924	2012–13	Bulgarian First League	7	0	0	0	–		7	0
Haka	2013	Ykkönen	3	0	0	0	–		3	0
Career total			153	1	4	0	8	0	165	1
