= Yordan Varbanov =

Bulgarian footballer

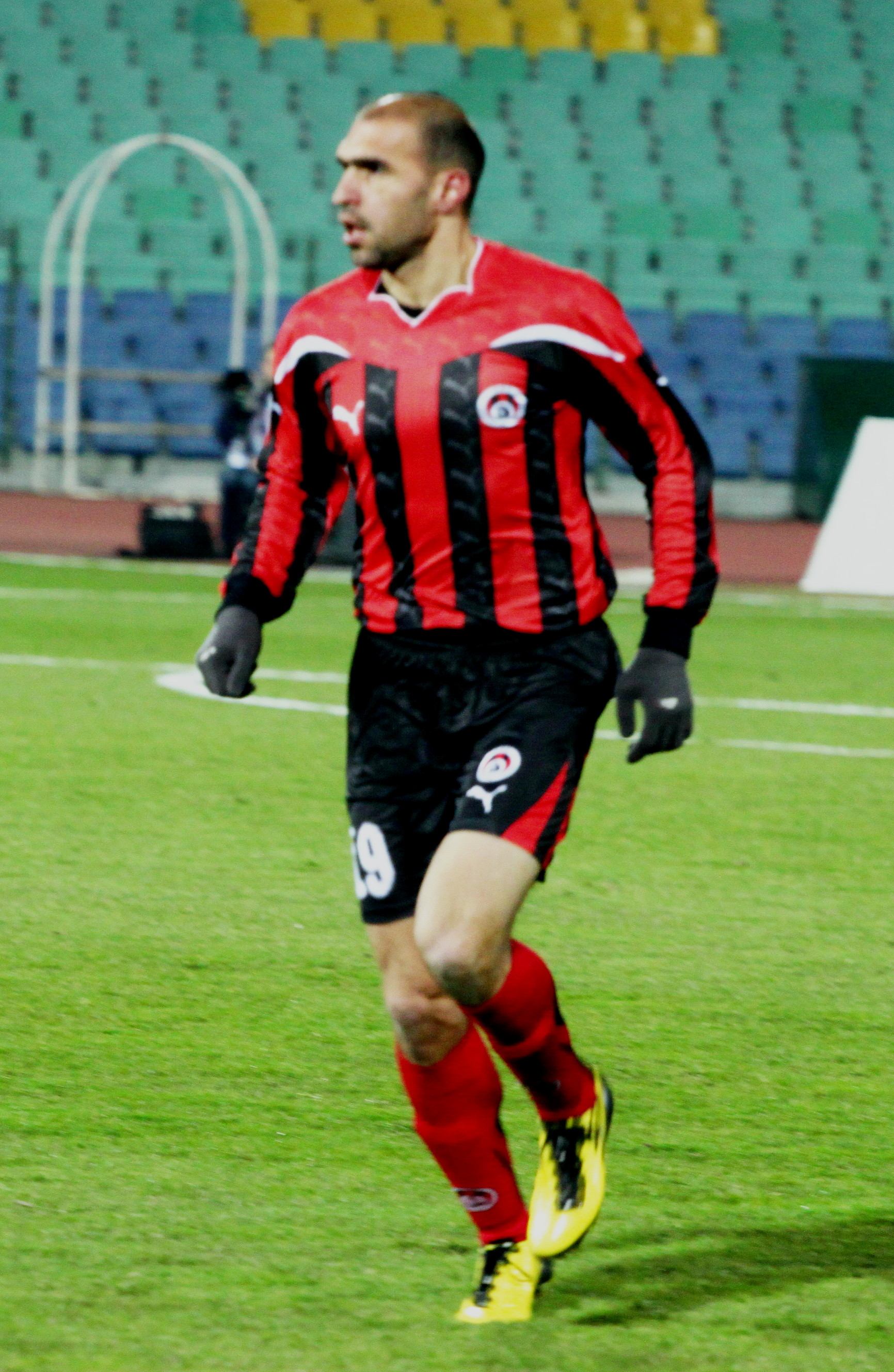
- Varbanov with Lokomotiv Sofia in 2011

Personal information
- Full name: Yordan Genchev Varbanov
- Date of birth: 15 February 1980 (age 46)
- Place of birth: Kazanlak, Bulgaria
- Height: 1.86 m (6 ft 1 in)
- Position: Centre back

Team information
- Current team: CSKA Sofia (youth coach)

Senior career*
Years	Team	Apps	(Gls)
1997–1999	Rozova Dolina	25	(1)
1999–2000	Slanchev bryag	23	(2)
2000–2005	CSKA Sofia	32	(0)
2001–2002	→ Spartak Varna (loan)	24	(0)
2005	Conegliano German	12	(1)
2006–2008	Lokomotiv Sofia	37	(0)
2008–2010	Hangzhou Greentown	54	(2)
2010	Anhui Jiufang	23	(0)
2011–2012	Lokomotiv Sofia	38	(0)
2013–2018	Vitosha Bistritsa	101	(2)
2023	Kostenets	?	(?)
Total		369	(8)

Managerial career
- 2021–2022: Vitosha Bistritsa (assistant)
- 2025–: CSKA Sofia (youth coach)
- * Club domestic league appearances and goals

Yordan Genchev Varbanov (Bulgarian: Йордан Генчев Върбанов; born 15 February 1980) is a Bulgarian footballer who plays as a defender for Kostenets.

Varbanov previously played for CSKA Sofia and Lokomotiv Sofia in the Bulgarian A PFG.

== Honours ==
CSKA Sofia

- Bulgarian League (2): 2002–03, 2004–05
