= Nikolay Dyulgerov =

Bulgarian professional footballer

Nikolay Dyulgerov Николай Дюлгеров
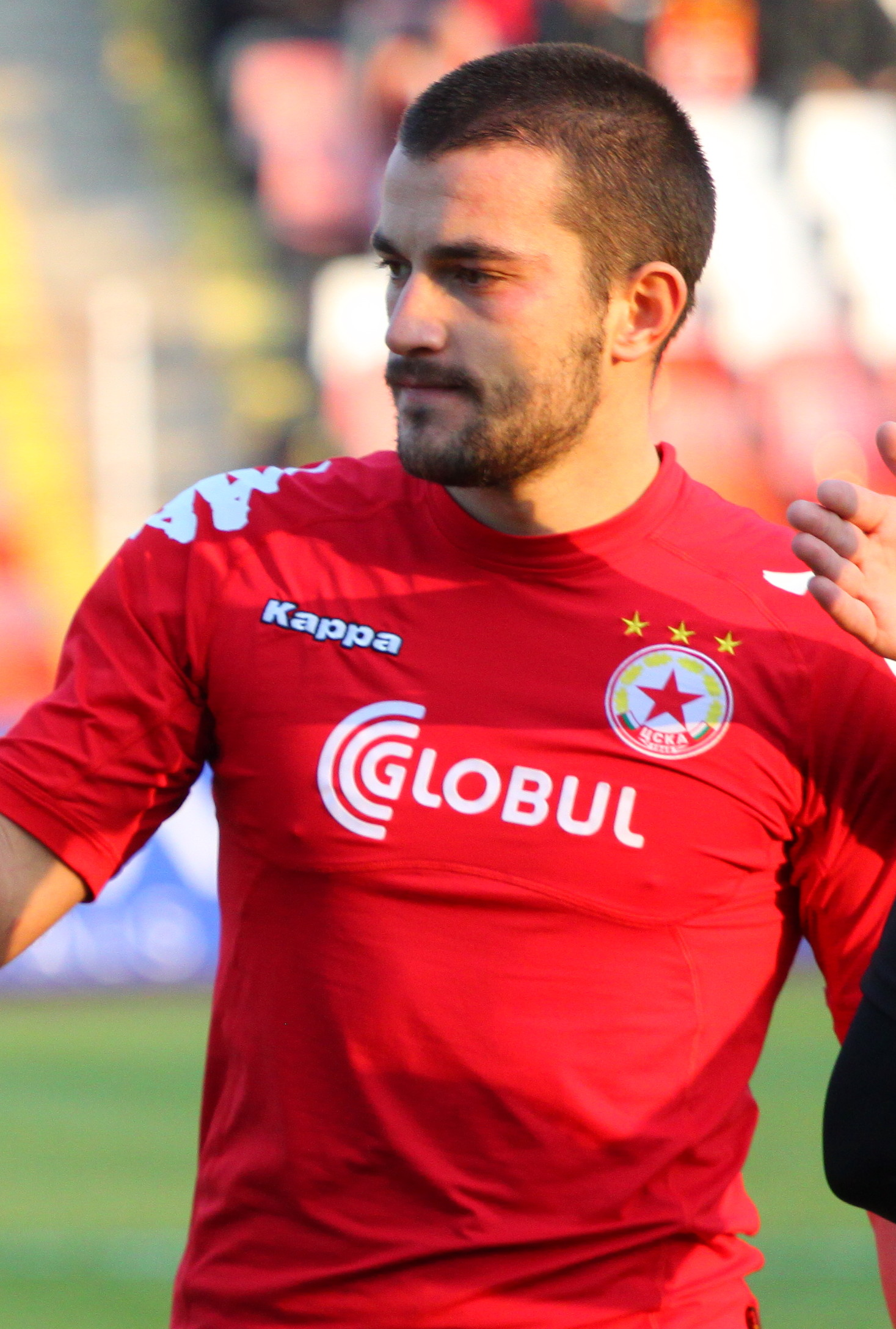

Personal information
- Full name: Nikolay Velkov Dyulgerov
- Date of birth: 10 March 1988 (age 38)
- Place of birth: Sofia, Bulgaria
- Height: 1.83 m (6 ft 0 in)
- Position: Midfielder

Team information
- Current team: Kostenets

Youth career
- Levski Sofia

Senior career*
Years	Team	Apps	(Gls)
2007–2010	Slavia Sofia	33	(1)
2008–2009	→ Minyor Pernik (loan)	39	(5)
2011	Ludogorets Razgrad	9	(0)
2012	CSKA Sofia	12	(0)
2012	Lokomotiv Plovdiv	9	(0)
2013	Slavia Sofia	1	(0)
2013	CSKA Sofia	7	(0)
2014–2015	Spartak Semey	34	(1)
2015	Septemvri Sofia	6	(2)
2016	Akragas	12	(0)
2016–2017	Neftochimic Burgas	32	(3)
2017–2018	Hapoel Marmorek	31	(4)
2018	Tsarsko Selo	12	(1)
2019	Rabotnički	3	(0)
2019	Slavia Sofia	8	(0)
2020–2021	Sportist Svoge	4	(0)
2023–	Kostenets		

International career
2007–2009	Bulgaria U21	6	(0)
- * Club domestic league appearances and goals

Nikolay Velkov Dyulgerov (Bulgarian: Николай Велков Дюлгеров; born 10 March 1988) is a Bulgarian retired professional footballer who played as a midfielder for Kostenets.

== Career ==
In June 2018, Dyulgerov joined Second League club Tsarsko Selo.

== Career statistics ==
As of 20 December 2019

Appearances and goals by club, season and competition
Club	Season	League			Cup		Europe		Total	
Club	Season	Division	Apps	Goals	Apps	Goals	Apps	Goals	Apps	Goals
Slavia Sofia	2007–08	A Group	6	0	0	0	–		6	0
Minyor Pernik (loan)	2007–08	B Group	12	4	0	0	–		12	4
Minyor Pernik (loan)	2008–09	A Group	27	1	3	0	–		30	1
Minyor Pernik (loan)	Total		39	5	3	0	0	0	42	5
Slavia Sofia	2009–10	A Group	22	1	1	0	–		23	1
Slavia Sofia	2010–11	A Group	5	0	0	0	–		5	0
Slavia Sofia	Total		33	1	1	0	0	0	34	1
Ludogorets Razgrad	2010–11	B Group	7	0	0	0	–		7	0
Ludogorets Razgrad	2011–12	A Group	2	0	0	0	–		2	0
Ludogorets Razgrad	Total		9	0	0	0	0	0	9	0
CSKA Sofia	2011–12	A Group	12	0	1	0	–		13	0
Lokomotiv Plovdiv	2012–13	A Group	9	0	0	0	–		9	0
Slavia Sofia	2012–13	A Group	1	0	1	0	–		2	0
CSKA Sofia	2013–14	A Group	7	0	1	0	–		8	0
Spartak Semey	2014	Kazakhstan Premier League	22	1	0	0	–		22	1
Spartak Semey	2015	Kazakhstan First League	12	0	0	0	–		12	0
Spartak Semey	Total		34	1	0	0	0	0	34	1
Septemvri Sofia	2015–16	V Group	6	2	0	0	–		6	2
Akragas	2015–16	Lega Pro	12	0	0	0	–		12	0
Neftochimic Burgas	2016–17	Bulgarian First League	32	3	2	0	–		34	3
Hapoel Marmorek	2017–18	Liga Leumit	31	4	2	1	–		33	5
Tsarsko Selo	2018–19	Bulgarian Second League	12	1	1	0	–		13	1
Rabotnički	2018–19	1. MFL	3	0	0	0	–		3	0
Slavia Sofia	2019–20	Bulgarian First League	8	0	0	0	–		8	0
Career total			248	17	12	1	0	0	260	18
