= Nikolay Nikolov (footballer, born 1981) =

Bulgarian footballer

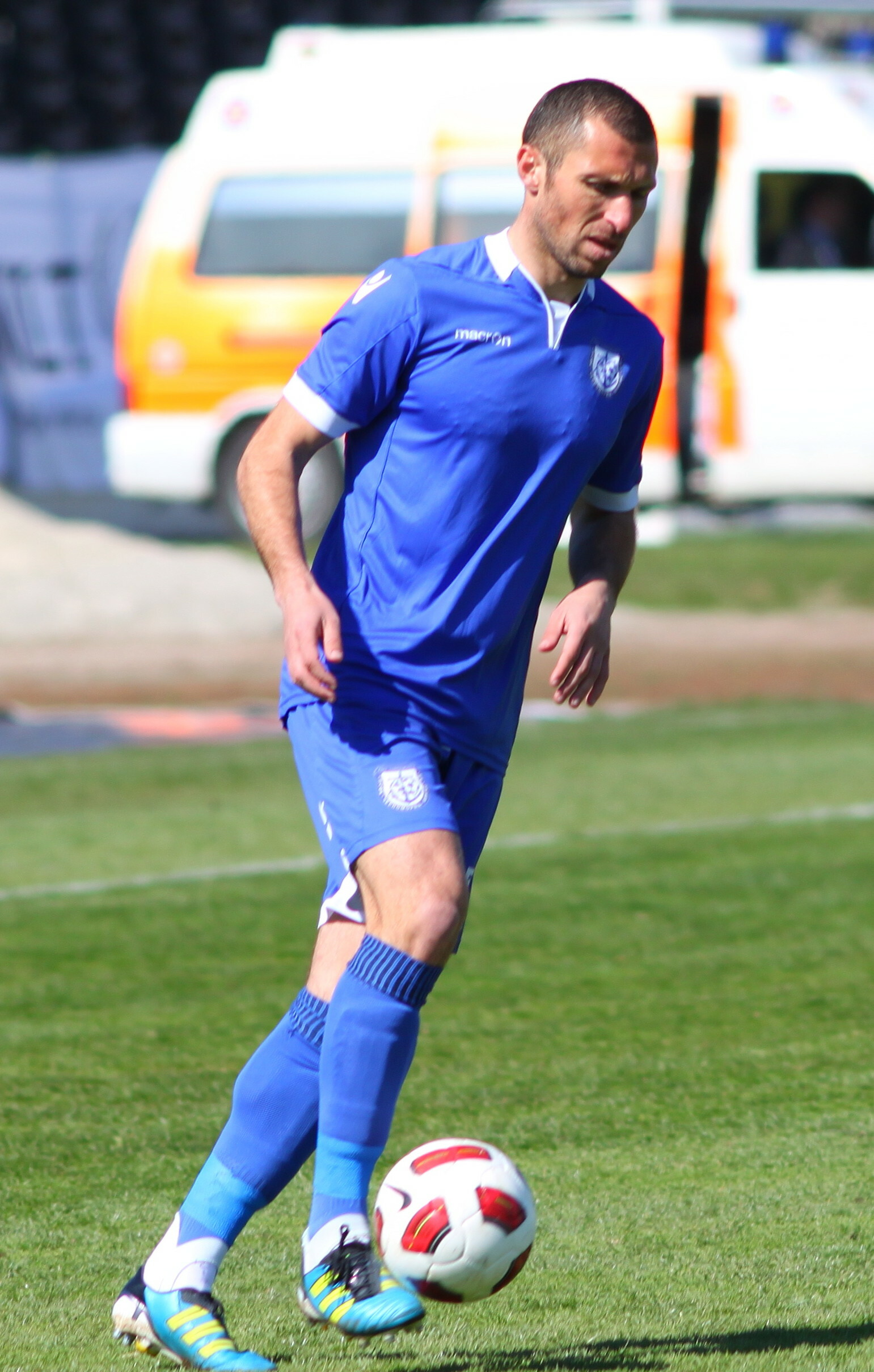

Personal information
- Full name: Nikolay Ivanov Nikolov
- Date of birth: 26 January 1981 (age 45)
- Place of birth: Sofia, Bulgaria
- Height: 1.79 m (5 ft 10 in)
- Position: Centre-back

Team information
- Current team: Kostenets (player–manager)

Senior career*
Years	Team	Apps	(Gls)
2001–2003	Balkan Botevgrad	?	(?)
2003–2004	Levski-Spartak	?	(?)
2004–2006	Pirin Gotse Delchev	49	(1)
2006	Levski Sofia	0	(0)
2006–2009	Chernomorets Burgas	63	(3)
2009	Montana	14	(2)
2010	Banants	26	(1)
2011	Montana	9	(1)
2011–2012	Chernomorets Burgas	28	(2)
2013	Lokomotiv Sofia	8	(0)
2013	Pirin Gotse Delchev	6	(0)
2014	Montana	10	(0)
2014	Marek Dupnitsa	15	(0)
2015	Conegliano German	?	(?)
2015–2016	Septemvri Sofia	10	(1)
2016	Levski Karlovo	5	(0)
2017–2018	Marek Dupnitsa	?	(?)
2018–2019	Botev Ihtiman	21	(1)
2020–2021	Granit Vladaya	?	(?)
2023–	Kostenets	?	(?)

Managerial career
- 2023–: Kostenets (player-manager)
- * Club domestic league appearances and goals as of 30 January 2017

Nikolay Nikolov (Bulgarian: Николай Николов; born 26 January 1981) is a Bulgarian footballer who currently plays as a defender and manager for Kostenets.

== Career ==
Nikolov started your career in Levski Sofia. After that he played for Balkan Botevgrad, Levski-Spartak, Levski Sofia, Pirin Gotse Delchev, Chernomorets, Montana, and Armenian club Banants.

On 30 January 2017, Nikolov joined Marek Dupnitsa. He left the club at the end of the 2017–18 season.
