= Evgeni Karamanov =

Bulgarian footballer

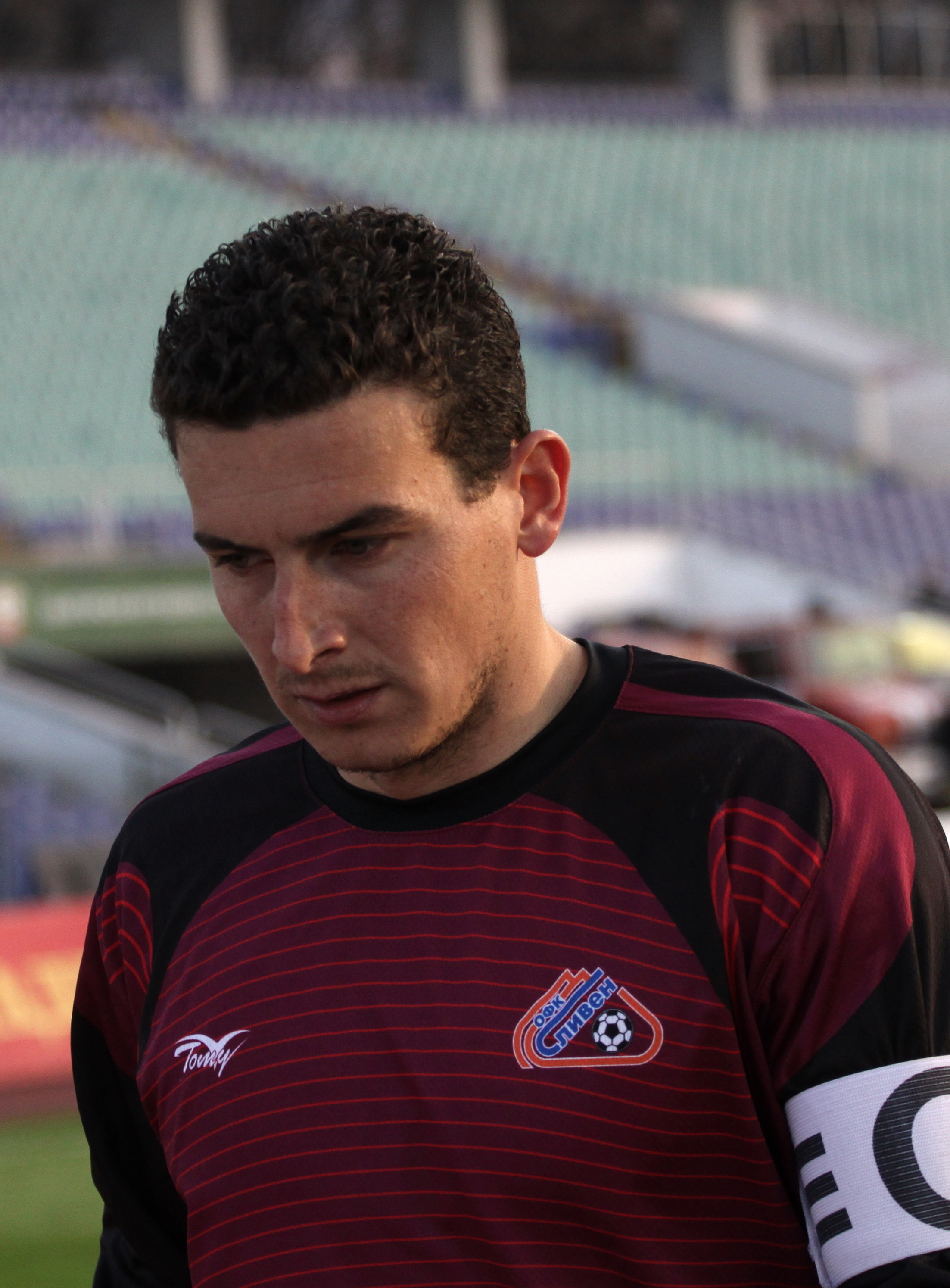

Personal information
- Full name: Evgeni Rumenov Karamanov
- Date of birth: 26 March 1986 (age 40)
- Place of birth: Sliven, Bulgaria
- Height: 1.79 m (5 ft 10 1/2 in)
- Position: Goalkeeper

Team information
- Current team: Zagorets
- Number: 86

Youth career
- Sliven 2000

Senior career*
| Years | Team | Apps | (Gls) |
| 2006–2012 | Sliven 2000 | 89 | (0) |
| 2013 | Neftochimic 1986 | 15 | (0) |
| 2014– | Zagorets | 12 | (0) |
- * Club domestic league appearances and goals as of 30 October 2013

Evgeni Karamanov (born 26 March 1986) is a Bulgarian footballer currently playing as a goalkeeper for Zagorets Nova Zagora.

Karamanov comes directly from Sliven`s Youth Academy. He made his debut for the first squad on 29 April 2007 in a match of the B PFG against Chernomorets Burgas. In the next 2007-08 season Karamanov played 18 matches and helped the team gain promotion to the first division.

== Club statistics ==
As of 22 January 2013

| Club | Season | League | | Cup | | Total | |
| Club | Season | Apps | Goals | Apps | Goals | Apps | Goals |
|---|---|---|---|---|---|---|---|
| Sliven 2000 | 2006–07 | 4 | 0 | 0 | 0 | 4 | 0 |
| Sliven 2000 | 2007–08 | 18 | 0 | 1 | 0 | 19 | 0 |
| Sliven 2000 | 2008–09 | 1 | 0 | 0 | 0 | 1 | 0 |
| Sliven 2000 | 2009–10 | 6 | 0 | 2 | 0 | 8 | 0 |
| Sliven 2000 | 2010–11 | 23 | 0 | 1 | 0 | 24 | 0 |
| Sliven 2000 | 2011–12 | 24 | 0 | 0 | 0 | 24 | 0 |
| Sliven 2000 | 2012–13 | 13 | 0 | 0 | 0 | 13 | 0 |
| Neftochimic 1986 | 2012–13 | 5 | 0 | 0 | 0 | 5 | 0 |
| Career totals | | 94 | 0 | 4 | 0 | 98 | 0 |

== Awards ==
- Champion of B PFG 2013 (with Neftochimic 1986)
