= Michał Protasewicz =

Polish footballer

Personal information
- Date of birth: 26 September 1985 (age 41)
- Place of birth: Knurów, Poland
- Height: 1.83 m (6 ft 0 in)
- Positions: Left-back; midfielder

Youth career
- Rot-Weiß Oberhausen

Senior career*
Years	Team	Apps	(Gls)
2003–2004	SV Schermbeck	6	(0)
2004	Twente B		
2005–2006	Górnik Zabrze	0	(0)
2006	Germania Gladbeck		
2007	Rot-Weiss Essen B		
2007–2013	Flota Świnoujście	35	(0)
2011	→ Górnik Wałbrzych (loan)	9	(0)
2011	→ Concordia PT (loan)	15	(1)
2012	→ Pogoń Barlinek (loan)	17	(0)
2013	Etar 1924	7	(0)
2013–2014	VFC Anklam	25	(0)
2014–2016	FC Insel Usedom	33	(19)
2016–2017	SV Siedenbollentin		
2017	Flota Świnoujście		
2018	FC Rot-Weiß Wolgast		
2019–2020	FC Insel Usedom		
2020–2021	Prawobrzeże Świnoujście	4	(0)
2021–2022	Flota Świnoujście	12	(0)
2022–2023	Wybrzeże Rewalskie Rewal	13	(1)
- * Club domestic league appearances and goals

Michał Protasewicz (born 26 September 1985) is a Polish former professional footballer who played as a defender.

== Career ==
=== Etar ===
On 16 January 2013, Protasewicz joined Bulgarian A PFG club Etar 1924.

== Honours ==
Flota Świnoujście

- III liga, group II: 2007–08
