= Valentin Tomov =

Bulgarian footballer

Personal information
- Full name: Valentin Yavorov Tomov
- Date of birth: 14 May 1996 (age 30)
- Place of birth: Plovdiv, Bulgaria
- Height: 1.84 m (6 ft 1/2 in)
- Position: Midfielder

Team information
- Current team: A.C.D. Treviso
- Number: 8

Youth career
- Botev Plovdiv

Senior career*
Years	Team	Apps	(Gls)
2014–2015	Botev Plovdiv	0	(0)
2016–	Treviso	21	(5)
- * Club domestic league appearances and goals as of 1 March 2016

Valentin Tomov (Bulgarian: Валентин Томов; born 14 May 1996 in Plovdiv) is a Bulgarian footballer who currently plays as a midfielder for A.C.D. Treviso 2013 / Treviso.

== Career ==
=== Botev Plovdiv ===
Tomov was the captain of Botev Plovdiv U19 team in season 2013–14. He participated in 29 games and scored 9 goals.

Tomov was promoted to the Botev Plovdiv U21 team. He was included for the first time in the first team for the away game with Haskovo which Botev won by a score of 2-1 but he remained an unused substitute.

On 30 June 2015 Tomov won the Bulgarian U19 cup with Botev Plovdiv and scored a goal in the final game against Lokomotiv Sofia. In January 2016 Tomov was released from Botev Plovdiv.
