= FC Etar 1924 Veliko Tarnovo =

Etar 1924
- Full name: PFC Etar 1924; ПФК "Етър 1924"
- Nickname: Бoлярите (The Bolyars)
- Founded: 2002; 23 years ago
- Dissolved: 8 May 2013; 12 years ago
- Ground: Stadion Ivaylo
- Capacity: 25,600
- 2012–13: A PFG, 15th (relegated)
Home colours	Away colours

Professional Football Club Etar 1924 (Bulgarian: Професионален футболен клуб "Етър 1924"), commonly referred to as Etar 1924 Veliko Tarnovo, is a former Bulgarian professional football club based in Veliko Tarnovo. They were last competing in the 2012–13 season of the Bulgarian A Professional Football Group, the top tier of professional football in Bulgaria. The club replaced the old FC Etar (Veliko Tarnovo), which won the Bulgarian championship in 1991.

The club's home ground had been Ivaylo Stadium since 1958, and their main nicknames were the Bolyars and the Violets, the latter in reference to the colour of their home kit, which was often mistaken for purple.

The club folded following the end of the 2012–13 A PFG due to financial difficulties. Etar Veliko Tarnovo acquired the license of Botev Debelets and played in the Bulgarian V AFG in the 2013/14 season.

== Honours ==
=== Domestic ===
- Bulgarian East B PFG
  - Winners (1): 2011–12
- Bulgarian North-West V AFG
  - Winners (1): 2002–03

== History ==
Etar crest used from 2002 to 2012

The club was founded as Etar 1924 in 2002, following severe financial problems plaguing the historical FC Etar, which folded in 2003. In their first season, they were promoted to B PFG as champions of the North-West V AFG.

In the 2004–05 season, Etar had their best Bulgarian Cup run, beating Dorostol Silistra and Slavia Sofia before losing to Levski Sofia in the Round of 16.

In September 2010, Velin Kefalov had been appointed as a manager of Etar 1924. He led the team to the third place in the West B PFG. Because Chernomorets Pomorie did not receive a licence to play in the A PFG, Etar competed in the promotion playoff, but lost 3–1 to Svetkavitsa Targovishte.

In June 2011, Kefalov left the club and was replaced by Georgi Todorov in the role of head coach. Todorov resigned after the first half of the 2011–12 season and was replaced by Tsanko Tsvetanov. А streak of good form in the second half of the season ensured promotion to the A PFG on 23 May 2012 with 1–0 home win against Nesebar.

The team finished the autumn part of the 2012-2013 A PFG in last place of the standings. As a result, the second half of the 2012-13 A PFG season saw a huge turnover in player and managerial personnel (Tsvetanov had already been replaced by Serdar Dayat). Despite a bright start to the spring season, the increasing financial uncertainty continued to plague the team and Etar relocated to Sliven, in part due to a conflict of interest with the Veliko Tarnovo supporter groups and the municipality, which contributed to the club remaining in the relegation zone. In May 2013, the team was practically dissolved and Etar's remaining A PFG opponents were awarded 3:0 wins by default until the end of the season.

The legacy of the club was succeeded by SFC Etar Veliko Tarnovo, which was established shortly after Etar 1924 folded.

== Last squad ==
As of 7 February 2013 Note: Flags indicate national team as defined under FIFA eligibility rules; some limited exceptions apply. Players may hold more than one non-FIFA nationality.

No.	Pos.	Nation	Player
1	GK	SRB	Nenad Filipović
4	DF	BUL	Rosen Vankov
5	DF	BUL	Martin Nikolov
6	MF	BUL	Emil Koparanov
7	MF	BUL	Nikolay Petrov
8	MF	TUR	Fatih Yılmaz
9	FW	BUL	Dormushali Saidhodzha (captain)
10	MF	FRA	Jacques Fey
11	FW	BUL	Iskren Pisarov
12	GK	TUR	Yilmaz Aksoy
13	DF	POL	Michał Protasewicz
14	MF	SWE	Mehmet Mehmet

No.	Pos.	Nation	Player
16	MF	TUR	Ali Aydogan
17	FW	SLE	Sulaiman Sesay-Fullah
18	MF	CPV	Jerson
19	DF	FIN	Patrik Rikama
20	FW	SWE	Sonny Karlsson
21	DF	NOR	Kai Risholt
24	DF	POL	Sławomir Cienciała
25	MF	GER	Paul Grischok
26	FW	BUL	Nikolai Nikolaev
32	FW	BUL	Dimitar Baydakov
33	GK	BUL	Ivailo Petkov
77	FW	BUL	Tyunay Kamber-Captain

=== Foreign players ===
Up to three non-EU nationals can be registered and given a squad number for the first team in the A PFG. Those non-EU nationals with European ancestry can claim citizenship from the nation their ancestors came from. If a player does not have European ancestry he can claim Bulgarian citizenship after playing in Bulgaria for 5 years.

== Managerial history ==
This is a list of the last seven Etar managers:

Name	Nat	From	To	Honours
Emil Dimitrov	(Bulgaria)	May 2005	June 2006	–
Stoyan Petrov	(Bulgaria)	June 2006	25 June 2007	–
Velin Kefalov	(Bulgaria)	25 June 2007	6 October 2008	–
Sasho Angelov	(Bulgaria)	6 October 2008	23 December 2008	–
Nikolay Arnaudov	(Bulgaria)	23 December 2008	21 September 2010	–
Velin Kefalov	(Bulgaria)	21 September 2010	30 June 2011	–
Georgi Todorov	(Bulgaria)	6 July 2011	12 December 2011	–
Tsanko Tsvetanov	(Bulgaria)	30 December 2011	15 October 2012	B PFG Champions
Serdar Dayat	(Turkey)	22 October 2012	20 April 2013	–
Grigor Petkov	(Bulgaria)	28 April 2013	3 May 2013	–
Rumen Dankov	(Bulgaria)	4 May 2013	8 May 2013	–

As of 8 May 2013
