= FC Lyubimets =

Bulgarian football club

Lyubimets
- Full name: Football Club Lyubimets
- Founded: 1921; 104 years ago /restored 2007/
- Ground: Gradski Stadium, Lyubimets
- Capacity: 4,000
- Chairman: Atanas Stalev
- Manager: Toshko Yordanov
- League: A RFG Haskovo
- 2023–24: A RFG Haskovo, 4th
Home colours	Away colours

FC Lyubimets (Bulgarian: ФК Любимец) is a Bulgarian football club based in Lyubimets. The team was founded in 1921 and re-founded in 2007. The team currently competes in the fourth tier of Bulgarian football, the A RFG Haskovo.

The club's biggest achievement came in 2013, when Lyubimets managed to promote to the A Group for the first time in club history for the 2013–14 season. Lyubimets was relegated, however, and has since slipped into the amateur levels of Bulgarian football.

The club's home ground is the local Municipal Stadium in Lyubimets, which has an overall capacity of 4,000 seats.

== History ==
The first club was founded as Football Club Maritsa in 1921. In 1947 the club changed its name to Football Club Strela. In the 1960s the club was finally named Football Club Lyubimets. The club participated in the third and fourth divisions of Bulgarian football for the majority of its history, before being dissolved by the end of the 1993–94 season.

In 2007, thirteen years later, the club was restored as Football Club Lyubimets 2007. In its first season, the club was promoted for the first time to the second division. In its first season in professional football, the club finished in 7th place.

On 9 January 2013, club's former player Veselin Velikov was announced as the new manager. Four months later he led Lyubimets to promotion to the A PFG for first time in the club's history, finishing in 2nd place in the B PFG.

The maiden season in the professional top-flight began with a 1–0 win over defending champions Ludogorets Razgrad, a big surprise in Bulgarian football. Lyubimets went on to earn 9 points from their first four games, including wins against Lokomotiv Sofia and Europa League participants Botev Plovdiv (2–1 away in Plovdiv). The team's form dropped after the fifth round, however, as it managed to win only one of their next 18 games in the first phase. This placed them in the relegation group for the remainder of the season. In the relegation round, they won only one of twelve possible matches, and were relegated to the B PFG, after finishing last.

In the summer of 2014, the BFU decided to refuse to give FC Lyubimets a license for the second league, similarly to the other teams relegated that year from the first tier, Neftochimic and Pirin Gotse Delchev. This was done mainly because of financial reasons, as Lyubimets could not provide enough financial resources to sustain themselves in professional football. Lyubimets was subsequently relegated to the fourth tier, the regional league of Haskovo. The team returned to the third tier after two seasons in the fourth division, but was relegated immediately.

== Honours ==
- Bulgarian B Group
  - Runners-up (1): 2012–13

== Current squad ==
As of 1 November 2016 Note: Flags indicate national team as defined under FIFA eligibility rules; some limited exceptions apply. Players may hold more than one non-FIFA nationality.

No.	Pos.	Nation	Player
3	DF	BUL	Ivan Yordanov
8	MF	BUL	Nikolay Nikolaev
9	FW	BUL	Ventsislav Yordanov
10	MF	BUL	Georgi Drumev
11	DF	BUL	Emil Asenov
12	GK	BUL	Ventsislav Dimitrov

No.	Pos.	Nation	Player
13	DF	BUL	Martin Belomorski
15	MF	BUL	Nikolay Ilchev
19	FW	BUL	Hristo Dyulgerov
21	MF	BUL	Dimitar Dimitrov
22	MF	BUL	Atanas Evtimov

== Managerial history ==
After restored

Name	Nationality	Years
Dimcho Markov	(Bulgaria)	June 2006–Oct 2008
Ivaylo Petev	(Bulgaria)	Oct 2008–Aug 2009
Stamen Belchev	(Bulgaria)	Aug 2009–Sept 2012
Krasimir Mechev	(Bulgaria)	Sept 2012–Jan 2013
Veselin Velikov	(Bulgaria)	1 January 2013–August 10, 2013
Krasimir Mechev	(Bulgaria)	10 August 2013–January 7, 2014
Voyn Voynov	(Bulgaria)	9 January 2014

== Notable stats ==
After the club was restored in 2007

Most appearances for the club

#	Name	Apps	Years
1	(Bulgaria) Emil Petkov	98	2008–2012
2	(Bulgaria) Ivan Minchev	78	2009–present
3	(Bulgaria) Ventsislav Yordanov	72	2008–2010/2012–present
4	(Bulgaria) Kircho Krumov	59	2008–2009/2010–2011
5	(Bulgaria) Anton Ognyanov	53	2011–present

Most goals for the club

#	Name	Gls	Years
1	(Bulgaria) Nikolay Pavlov	20	2011–2012
2	(Bulgaria) Anton Ognyanov	16	2011–present
3	(Bulgaria) Emil Petkov	12	2008–2012
4	(Bulgaria) Tzvetomir Matev	10	2010–2011
5	(Bulgaria) Atanas Lyubenov	8	2009–2011

Notes:

- Bold signals active players
- Correct as of 2013-06-10

== Past seasons ==
Season	League	Place	W	D	L	GF	GA	Pts	Bulgarian Cup
2015–16	A RFG (IV)	4th	13	7	4	58	32	46	not qualified
2016–17	Third League (III)	17th	9	6	19	38	79	33	not qualified
2017–18	A RFG (IV)	–	–	–	–	–	–	–	TBD
Green marks a season followed by promotion, red a season followed by relegation.
