= 2008–09 PFC Levski Sofia season =

Levski Sofia
2008–09 season
- Chairman: Todor Batkov
- Manager: Velislav Vutsov (until 13 August 2008); Emil Velev
- A Group: Champions
- Bulgarian Cup: Semi-finals
- UEFA Champions League: 3rd round
- UEFA Cup: 1st round
- Top goalscorer: League: Georgi Ivanov (12 goals); All: Georgi Ivanov (13 goals)
- Highest home attendance: 27 000 vs CSKA Sofia (9 May 2009)
- Lowest home attendance: 800 vs Belasitsa Petrich (18 October 2008)
Home colours	Away colours

The 2008–09 PFC Levski Sofia season included the club's 26th win of the A group of Bulgarian professional football, A Group. Additionally they competed in the Semi-finals of the 2008–09 Bulgarian Cup, but lost to OFC Pirin Blagoevgrad. The club made it to the third round of the UEFA Champions League. The top goal scorer was Georgi Ivanov with 13 total goals. The club changed managers from Velislav Vutsov to Emil Velev on 13 August 2008.

== Transfers ==
=== Summer transfers ===
In:

No.	Pos.	Nation	Player
—	FW	BUL	Georgi Ivanov (free transfer from (Croatia) NK Rijeka)
—	MF	BUL	Vladimir Gadzhev (on loan from (Greece) Panathinaikos)
—	FW	BUL	Georgi Hristov (free from Botev Plovdiv)
—	FW	MAR	Rachid Tiberkanine (from (Latvia) Daugava)
—	DF	CZE	David Bystron (from (Czech Republic) Banik Ostrava)
—	MF	BUL	Boyan Iliev (free from Spartak Varna)
—	GK	SVK	Daniel Kiss (on loan from (Slovakia) Slovan Bratislava)

Out:

No.	Pos.	Nation	Player
4	DF	CRO	Igor Tomašić (free transfer to (Israel) Maccabi Tel Aviv)
17	FW	BUL	Valeri Domovchiyski (to (Germany) Hertha Berlin)
—	FW	NGR	Ekundayo Jayeoba (to Chernomorets Burgas)
7	MF	BUL	Daniel Borimirov (retired)

See List of Bulgarian football transfers 2008–09

=== Winter transfers ===
In:

No.	Pos.	Nation	Player
—	MF	POR	Filipe da Costa (free transfer from CSKA Sofia)
—	DF	BUL	Yordan Miliev (from Lokomotiv Plovdiv)
—	FW	BUL	Hristo Yovov (free transfer from (Cyprus) Apollon Limassol)

Out:

No.	Pos.	Nation	Player
—	GK	SVK	Daniel Kiss (loan return to (Slovakia) Slovan Bratislava)
—	FW	BRA	Jean Carlos (to (Russia) Amkar Perm)
—	MF	BUL	Boyan Iliev (released)

See List of Bulgarian football transfers 2008–09

== Squad ==
Note: Flags indicate national team as defined under FIFA eligibility rules; some limited exceptions apply. Players may hold more than one non-FIFA nationality.

No.	Pos.	Nation	Player
1	GK	BUL	Georgi Petkov (captain)
2	DF	BUL	Viktor Genev
3	DF	BUL	Zhivko Milanov
5	DF	MAR	Youssef Rabeh
6	MF	MAR	Rachid Tiberkanine
8	MF	BUL	Georgi Sarmov
9	FW	BUL	Georgi Ivanov
10	MF	BUL	Hristo Yovov
11	FW	BUL	Georgi Hristov
12	GK	BUL	Bozhidar Mitrev
14	DF	BUL	Veselin Minev
15	DF	MAR	Chakib Benzoukane
18	MF	BUL	Miroslav Ivanov

No.	Pos.	Nation	Player
19	FW	BUL	Ivan Tsachev
20	FW	BRA	Joãozinho
21	FW	BRA	Ze Soares
22	MF	MKD	Darko Tasevski
23	DF	CZE	David Bystron
24	FW	BUL	Nikolay Dimitrov
25	DF	BRA	Lucio Wagner
27	FW	BUL	Enyo Krastovchev
30	MF	BUL	Lachezar Baltanov
31	GK	BUL	Tsvetan Dimitrov
45	MF	BUL	Vladimir Gadzhev
55	DF	BUL	Yordan Miliev
70	MF	POR	Filipe da Costa

== Competitions ==
=== A Group ===
==== Table ====
Pos	Team	Pld	W	D	L	GF	GA	GD	Pts	Qualification or relegation
1	Levski Sofia (C)	30	21	6	3	57	18	+39	69	Qualification for Champions League second qualifying round
2	CSKA Sofia	30	21	5	4	54	22	+32	68	Qualification for Europa League third qualifying round
3	Cherno More	30	18	6	6	48	19	+29	60	Qualification for Europa League second qualifying round
4	Litex Lovech	30	17	7	6	53	26	+27	58	Qualification for Europa League play-off round (Note: Litex Lovech won the 2008–09 Bulgarian Cup and qualified for the play-off round of the UEFA Europa League.)
5	Lokomotiv Sofia	30	16	6	8	52	29	+23	54	

Source: A PFG (in Bulgarian)
Rules for classification: 1st points; 2nd head-to-head points; 3rd head-to-head goal difference; 4th head-to-head goals scored; 5th head-to-head away goals scored; 6th goal difference; 7th goals scored
(C) Champions

==== Results summary ====
Overall								Home						Away					
Pld	W	D	L	GF	GA	GD	Pts	W	D	L	GF	GA	GD	W	D	L	GF	GA	GD
30	21	6	3	57	18	+39	69	12	2	1	34	9	+25	9	4	2	23	9	+14

Last updated: 13 May 2009.
Source: Soccerway

==== Results by round ====
Round	1	2	3	4	5	6	7	8	9	10	11	12	13	14	15	16	17	18	19	20	21	22	23	24	25	26	27	28	29	30
Ground	A	H	A	A	H	A	H	A	H	A	H	A	H	A	H	H	A	H	H	A	H	A	H	A	H	A	H	A	H	A
Result	L	W	D	W	W	L	W	W	W	D	D	W	W	W	W	W	W	W	W	D	L	W	W	W	W	W	W	W	D	D
Position	13	7	9	5	3	5	3	3	2	2	2	2	2	2	1	1	1	1	1	2	2	2	2	2	2	2	1	1	1	1

A = Away; H = Home; W = Win; D = Draw; L = Loss

==== Fixtures and results ====
9 August 2008 1	Vihren Sandanski	1–0	Levski Sofia	Sandanski
(EET)	Moke 76' (pen.)	Report		Stadium: Sandanski Stadium; Attendance: 2,500; Referee: Tsvetan Georgiev

17 August 2008 2	Levski Sofia	6–0	Botev Plovdiv	Sofia
(EET)	Hristov 5', 49', 56'; Tiberkanine 7'; Bystron 12'; Jean Carlos 85'	Report		Stadium: Georgi Asparuhov; Attendance: 3,000; Referee: Martin Bogdev

5 November 2008 3	Chernomorets Burgas	2–2	Levski Sofia	Burgas
(EET)	Bozhilov 69'; Marcio 84'	Report	Tasevski 15'; Sarmov 19'	Stadium: Lazur; Attendance: 6,000; Referee: Nikolay Yordanov

31 August 2008 4	Lokomotiv Plovdiv	2–3	Levski Sofia	Plovdiv
(EET)	Todorov 9', 15'	Report	Milanov 14', 90'; Joaozinho 76'	Stadium: Lokomotiv; Attendance: 5,000; Referee: Stefan Spasov

12 September 2008 5	Levski Sofia	3–0	Cherno More	Sofia
(EET)	Hristov 15' (pen.); Joaozinho 34' (pen.); Tiberkanine 87'	Report		Stadium: Georgi Asparuhov; Attendance: 2,000; Referee: Tsvetan Georgiev

21 September 2008 6	Lokomotiv Sofia	1–0	Levski Sofia	Sofia
(EET)	Bogdanović 67'	Report		Stadium: Lokomotiv; Attendance: 3,000; Referee: Stanislav Todorov

27 September 2008 7	Levski Sofia	2–0	Litex Lovech	Sofia
(EET)	Tasevski 34', 67'	Report		Stadium: Georgi Asparuhov; Attendance: 5,000; Referee: Cristian Balazs (Romania)

6 October 2008 8	Lokomotiv Mezdra	0–1	Levski Sofia	Mezdra
(EET)		Report	Dimitrov 7'	Stadium: Lokomotiv; Attendance: 3,500; Referee: Nikolay Yordanov

18 October 2008 9	Levski Sofia	2–0	Belasitsa Petrich	Sofia
(EET)	Hristov 9'; Tiberkanine 26'	Report		Stadium: Georgi Asparuhov; Attendance: 800; Referee: Ahmed Ahmed

26 October 2008 10	Sliven	0–0	Levski Sofia	Sliven
(EET)		Report		Stadium: Hadzhi Dimitar Stadium; Attendance: 8,000; Referee: Anton Genov

1 November 2008 11	Levski Sofia	1–1	CSKA Sofia	Sofia
(EET)	Ivanov 66'	Report	Lazarov 59' (pen.)	Stadium: Vasil Levski; Attendance: 18,000; Referee: Stanislav Todorov

9 November 2008 12	Spartak Varna	0–1	Levski Sofia	Varna
(EET)		Report	Joãozinho 67'	Stadium: Spartak; Attendance: 5,000; Referee: Georgi Yordanov

16 November 2008 13	Levski Sofia	1–0	Slavia Sofia	Sofia
(EET)	Ivanov 36'	Report		Stadium: Georgi Asparuhov; Attendance: 3,000; Referee: Anton Genov

23 November 2008 14	Minyor Pernik	0–2	Levski Sofia	Pernik
(EET)		Report	Ivanov 44', 64'	Stadium: Minyor; Attendance: 5,000; Referee: Hristo Ristoskov

29 November 2008 15	Levski Sofia	2–0	Pirin Blagoevgrad	Sofia
(EET)	Ivanov 52' 67'	Report		Stadium: Georgi Asparuhov; Attendance: 4,000; Referee: Martin Bogdev

8 March 2009 16	Levski Sofia	3–2	Vihren Sandanski	Sofia
(EET)	Joãozinho 9'; Ivanov 45'; Hristov 89'	Report	Zografakis 4'; Rusev 72'	Stadium: Georgi Asparuhov; Attendance: 4,000; Referee: Ahmed Ahmed

14 March 2009 17	Botev Plovdiv	0–1	Levski Sofia	Plovdiv
(EET)		Report	Tasevski 19'	Stadium: Hristo Botev; Attendance: 10,000; Referee: Stanislav Todorov

18 March 2009 18	Levski Sofia	3–1	Chernomorets Burgas	Sofia
(EET)	Tasevski 44'; Yovov 62'; Ze Soares 86'	Report	Bozhilov 48'	Stadium: Georgi Asparuhov; Attendance: 1,000; Referee: Georgi Ignatov

22 March 2009 19	Levski Sofia	1–0	Lokomotiv Plovdiv	Sofia
(EET)	Yovov 1'	Report		Stadium: Georgi Asparuhov; Attendance: 4,000; Referee: Tsvetan Georgiev

4 April 2009 20	Cherno More	0–0	Levski Sofia	Varna
(EET)		Report		Stadium: Ticha Stadium; Attendance: 12,000; Referee: Hristo Ristoskov

11 April 2009 21	Levski Sofia	0–3	Lokomotiv Sofia	Sofia
(EET)		Report	Kamburov 17', 35', 58'	Stadium: Georgi Asparuhov; Attendance: 7,000; Referee: Nikolay Yordanov

17 April 2009 22	Litex Lovech	1–2	Levski Sofia	Lovech
(EET)	Sandrinho 11'	Report	Georgi Ivanov 7', 18'	Stadium: Lovech Stadium; Attendance: 7,000; Referee: Ivaylo Stoyanov

23 April 2009 23	Levski Sofia	3–1	Lokomotiv Mezdra	Sofia
(EET)	Sarmov 56'; Yovov 64'; Ivanov 85'	Report	Georgiev 4'	Stadium: Georgi Asparuhov; Attendance: 5,000; Referee: Georgi Yordanov

26 April 2009 24	Belasitsa Petrich	1–7	Levski Sofia	Blagoevgrad
(EET)	Asen Georgiev 52'	Report	Ivanov 6'; Yovov 35'; Hristov 55', 63', 65', 87'; Tsachev 76'	Stadium: Hristo Botev; Attendance: 5,000; Referee: Bogomil Marinov

3 May 2009 25	Levski Sofia	1–0	Sliven	Sofia
(EET)	Ivanov 72'	Report		Stadium: Georgi Asparuhov; Attendance: 4,000; Referee: Stanislav Todorov

9 May 2009 26	CSKA Sofia	0–2	Levski Sofia	Sofia
(EET)		Report	Hristov 36'; Ze Soares 58'	Stadium: Vasil Levski; Attendance: 27,000; Referee: Stefan Spasov

17 May 2009 27	Levski Sofia	5–0	Spartak Varna	Sofia
(EET)	Tasevski 1'; Bystron 24'; Tsachev 70', 85', 87'	Report		Stadium: Georgi Asparuhov; Attendance: 10,000; Referee: Aleksandar Kostadinov

23 May 2009 28	Slavia Sofia	0–1	Levski Sofia	Sofia
(EET)		Report	Ze Soares 52'	Stadium: Ovcha Kupel; Attendance: 10,000; Referee: Tsvetan Georgiev

31 May 2009 29	Levski Sofia	1–1	Minyor Pernik	Sofia
(EET)	Gadzhev 76'	Report	Hazurov 51'	Stadium: Georgi Asparuhov; Attendance: 15,000; Referee: Asen Nikolov

13 June 2009 30	Pirin Blagoevgrad	1–1	Levski Sofia	Blagoevgrad
(EET)	Kotsev 73'	Report	Nedyalkov 76'	Stadium: Hristo Botev; Attendance: 5,000; Referee: Bogomil Marinov

=== Bulgarian Cup ===
26 November 2008 Second round	Lokomotiv Sofia	1–2 (a.e.t.)	Levski Sofia	Sofia
EEST	Paskov 33'	Report	Joãozinho 36' (pen.); Dimitrov 111'	Stadium: Lokomotiv; Attendance: 3,000; Referee: Stefan Spasov

8 December 2008 Third round	Levski Sofia	2–1 (a.e.t.)	Sliven	Sofia
EEST	Jean Carlos 68'; Gadzhev 112'	Report	Yanev 4'	Stadium: Georgi Asparuhov; Attendance: 2,000; Referee: Stanislav Todorov

4 March 2009 Quarterfinal	Vihren Sandanski	0–2	Levski Sofia	Kyustendil
EEST		Report	Ivanov 13'; Tasevski 28'	Stadium: Osogovo Stadium; Attendance: 2,000; Referee: Nikolay Yordanov

29 April 2009 Semifinal	Pirin Blagoevgrad	1–0	Levski Sofia	Blagoevgrad
EEST	Peev 56'	Report		Stadium: Hristo Botev; Attendance: 7,000; Referee: Georgi Ignatov

=== UEFA Champions League ===
==== Third qualifying round ====
13 August 2008 1st leg	Levski Sofia (Bulgaria)	0–1	(Belarus) BATE Borisov	Sofia, Bulgaria
20:00 EEST		Report	Rzhevsky 60'	Stadium: Georgi Asparuhov; Attendance: 20,000; Referee: Jonas Erikson (Sweden)

27 August 2008 2nd leg	BATE Borisov (Belarus)	1–1 (2–1 agg.)	(Bulgaria) Levski Sofia	Barysaw, Belarus
19:00 EEST	Sosnovsky 14'	Report	Gadzhev 38'	Stadium: Haradski; Attendance: 5,000; Referee: Konrad Plautz (Austria)

=== UEFA Cup ===
==== First round ====
18 September 2008 1st leg	Žilina (Slovakia)	1–1	(Bulgaria) Levski Sofia	Žilina, Slovakia
20:30 EEST	Vladavić 49' (pen.)	Report	Joãozinho 64'	Stadium: Štadión pod Dubňom; Attendance: 5,000; Referee: Paulo Costa (Portugal)

2 October 2008 2nd leg	Levski Sofia (Bulgaria)	0–1 (1–2 agg.)	(Slovakia) Žilina	Sofia, Bulgaria
19:30 EEST		Report	Adauto 60'	Stadium: Georgi Asparuhov; Attendance: 13,000; Referee: Radek Matejek (Czech Republic)
