= 2009–10 PFC Levski Sofia season =

Levski Sofia
2009–10 season
- Chairman: Todor Batkov
- Manager: Emil Velev (until 23 July); Ratko Dostanić (until 18 October); Georgi Ivanov (caretaker until 14 May 2010)
- A Group: Third place
- Bulgarian Cup: Third Round
- UEFA Champions League: Playoff round
- UEFA Europa League: Group stage
- Bulgarian Supercup: Winner
- Top goalscorer: League: Hristo Yovov (11); All: Hristo Yovov (14)
- Highest home attendance: 20 000 vs CSKA (27 March 2009)
- Lowest home attendance: 1 000 vs Beroe (18 October 2010)
Home colours	Away colours

The 2009–10 season is Levski Sofia's 88th season in the First League. This article shows player statistics and all matches (official and friendly) that the club has played during the 2009–10 season.

== First-team squad ==
=== Current squad ===
As of 4 July 2009 (according to latest announcements) Note: Flags indicate national team as defined under FIFA eligibility rules; some limited exceptions apply. Players may hold more than one non-FIFA nationality.

No.	Pos.	Nation	Player
1	GK	BUL	Georgi Petkov (captain)
2	DF	BUL	Victor Genev
3	DF	BUL	Zhivko Milanov
5	DF	MAR	Youssef Rabeh
6	MF	MAR	Rachid Tiberkanine
8	MF	BUL	Georgi Sarmov
9	FW	BUL	Georgi Ivanov
10	MF	BUL	Hristo Yovov
11	FW	BUL	Georgi Hristov
12	GK	BUL	Bozhidar Mitrev
14	DF	BUL	Veselin Minev
15	DF	MAR	Chakib Benzoukane
16	MF	BUL	Marian Ognyanov
19	FW	BUL	Ivan Tsachev

No.	Pos.	Nation	Player
20	MF	BRA	Joãozinho
21	FW	BRA	Zé Soares
22	MF	MKD	Darko Tasevski
23	DF	CZE	David Bystroň
24	FW	BUL	Nikolay Dimitrov
25	DF	BUL	Lúcio Wagner
27	MF	FRA	Cédric Bardon
28	FW	BUL	Aleksandar Kirov
29	FW	BUL	Ismail Isa Mustafa
30	MF	BUL	Lachezar Baltanov
31	GK	BUL	Tzvetan Dimitrov
45	MF	BUL	Vladimir Gadzhev
55	DF	BUL	Yordan Miliev

=== Transfers ===
==== Summer transfers ====
In: Note: Flags indicate national team as defined under FIFA eligibility rules; some limited exceptions apply. Players may hold more than one non-FIFA nationality.

No.	Pos.	Nation	Player
11	DF	BUL	Elin Topuzakov (free agent)
16	MF	BUL	Mariyan Ognyanov (loan return from Belasitsa Petrich)
17	FW	NGR	Deniran Ortega (on loan from Slavia Sofia)
27	MF	FRA	Cédric Bardon (from Anorthosis Famagusta)
70	MF	SRB	Saša Simonović (from Lokomotiv Mezdra)

Out: Note: Flags indicate national team as defined under FIFA eligibility rules; some limited exceptions apply. Players may hold more than one non-FIFA nationality.

No.	Pos.	Nation	Player
4	MF	BUL	Georgi Chakarov (on loan to Sportist Svoge)
9	FW	BUL	Georgi Ivanov (was not indexed because of an injury)
17	MF	BUL	Georgi Nedyalkov (on loan to Sportist Svoge)
18	MF	BUL	Miroslav Ivanov (to Montana)
19	FW	BUL	Ivan Tsachev (on loan to Pirin Blagoevgrad)
23	DF	CZE	David Bystroň (on loan to Viktoria Plzeň)
26	DF	BUL	Martin Dimov (on loan to Sportist Svoge)
29	FW	BUL	Ismail Isa (on loan to Lokomotiv Mezdra)
34	DF	BUL	Dimitar Dimitrov (on loan to Spartak Plovdiv)
52	DF	BUL	Stefan Stanchev (on loan to Pirin Blagoevgrad)
70	MF	POR	Filipe da Costa (to Nacional)
—	MF	BUL	Dzuneit Yashar (to Slavia Sofia)
—	MF	BUL	Ivo Mikhailov (to Chavdar Etropole)
—	DF	BUL	Todor Stoev (to Chavdar Etropole)

==== Winter transfers ====
In:

No.	Pos.	Nation	Player
4	DF	BUL	Stefan Stanchev (loan return from Pirin Blagoevgrad)
6	MF	GHA	Michael Tawiah (from Lokomotiv Mezdra)
7	MF	BUL	Aleksandar Aleksandrov (from Cherno More Varna)
19	FW	BUL	Miroslav Antonov (from Sportist Svoge)
21	DF	SVK	Peter Petras (from Slovan Bratislava)
—	FW	BUL	Ivan Tsachev (loan return from Pirin Blagoevgrad)

Out:

No.	Pos.	Nation	Player
3	DF	BUL	Zhivko Milanov (to Vaslui)
5	DF	MAR	Youssef Rabeh (to Anzhi Makhachkala)
17	FW	NGR	Deniran Ortega (loan return to Slavia Sofia)
21	MF	BRA	Zé Soares (to Metalurh Donetsk)
28	FW	BUL	Aleksandar Kirov (on loan to Lokomotiv Mezdra)
43	FW	BUL	Boyan Tabakov (on loan to Lokomotiv Mezdra)
44	MF	BUL	Borislav Baldzhiyski (on loan to Lokomotiv Mezdra)
50	DF	BUL	Simeon Ivanov (to Rayo Vallecano)
99	FW	BUL	Georgi Hristov (on loan to Wisła Kraków)

== Competitions ==
=== Bulgarian Supercup ===
1 August 2009	Levski Sofia	1–0	Litex Lovech	Sofia
18:00	Bardon 65'	Report		Stadium: Vasil Levski National Stadium; Attendance: 7,000; Referee: Stefan Spasov (Pernik)

=== A Group ===
==== Table ====
Pos	Team	Pld	W	D	L	GF	GA	GD	Pts	Qualification or relegation
1	Litex Lovech (C)	30	22	4	4	59	17	+42	70	Qualification for Champions League second qualifying round
2	CSKA Sofia	30	16	10	4	51	25	+26	58	Qualification for Europa League third qualifying round
3	Levski Sofia	30	17	6	7	57	26	+31	57	Qualification for Europa League second qualifying round
4	Lokomotiv Sofia	30	15	7	8	47	33	+14	52	
5	Chernomorets Burgas	30	15	6	9	44	29	+15	51	

Source: A PFG (in Bulgarian)
Rules for classification: 1st points; 2nd head-to-head points; 3rd head-to-head goal difference; 4th head-to-head goals scored; 5th head-to-head away goals scored; 6th goal difference; 7th goals scored
(C) Champions

==== Results summary ====
Overall								Home						Away					
Pld	W	D	L	GF	GA	GD	Pts	W	D	L	GF	GA	GD	W	D	L	GF	GA	GD
30	17	6	7	57	26	+31	57	10	2	3	34	9	+25	7	4	4	23	17	+6

Last updated: 16 May 2010.
Source: Soccerway

==== Results by round ====
Round	1	2	3	4	5	6	7	8	9	10	11	12	13	14	15	16	17	18	19	20	21	22	23	24	25	26	27	28	29	30
Ground	H	A	H	A	H	A	H	A	H	A	H	A	H	H	A	A	H	A	H	A	H	A	H	A	H	A	H	A	A	H
Result	W	W	D	W	L	L	L	D	L	W	W	W	W	W	L	W	W	L	W	L	D	D	W	W	W	D	W	D	W	W
Position	2	2	2	2	4	6	6	7	9	7	5	5	4	3	5	4	4	4	4	4	4	5	5	4	4	4	4	4	3	3

A = Away; H = Home; W = Win; D = Draw; L = Loss

==== Fixtures and results ====
8 August 2009 1	Levski Sofia	5–0	Botev Plovdiv	Sofia
18:00 EEST	Krastovchev 6'; Miliev 15'; Tasevski 66'; Ortega 73', 77'	Report		Stadium: Georgi Asparuhov; Attendance: 5,000; Referee: Vihren Manev (Sofia)

15 August 2009 2	Minyor Pernik	0–2	Levski Sofia	Pernik
16:00 EEST		Report	Yovov 79'; Ortega 84'	Stadium: Minyor; Attendance: 5,000; Referee: Vihren Manev (Sofia)

25 November 2009 3	Levski Sofia	2–2	Litex Lovech	Sofia
19:30 EEST	Soares 48'; Yovov 57'	Report	Nikolov 11'; Niflore 89'	Stadium: Georgi Asparuhov; Attendance: 10,000; Referee: Nikolay Yordanov (Sofia)

29 August 2009 4	Slavia Sofia	1–3	Levski Sofia	Slavia
16:00 EEST	Júnior 79'	Report	Bardon 2'; Soares 45'; Dimitrov 90'	Stadium: Slavia; Attendance: 5,000; Referee: Stefan Spasov (Pernik)

12 September 2009 5	Levski Sofia	1–2	Lokomotiv Sofia	Sofia
19:30 EEST	Yovov 60'	Report	Karadzhinov 52'; Kamburov 64' (pen.)	Stadium: Georgi Asparuhov; Attendance: 4,000; Referee: Nikolay Yordanov (Sofia)

20 September 2009 6	CSKA Sofia	2–0	Levski Sofia	Sofia
20:00 EEST	I. Stoyanov 15'; K. Stoyanov 65'	Report		Stadium: Vasil Levski; Attendance: 17,000; Referee: Anton Genov (Sofia)

27 September 2009 7	Levski Sofia	0–1	Chernomorets Burgas	Lovech
19:30 EEST		Report	Dyankov 52'	Stadium: Lovech; Attendance: 1,500; Referee: Aleksandar Kostadinov (Sofia)

4 October 2009 8	Lokomotiv Plovdiv	2–2	Levski Sofia	Plovdiv
15:00 EEST	Iliev 51'; Dakson 90'	Report	Bardon 34' (pen.); Yovov 44'	Stadium: Lauta; Attendance: 5,000; Referee: Hristo Ristoskov (Sandanski)

18 October 2009 9	Levski Sofia	0–1	Beroe	Sofia
19:30 EEST		Report	Dimitrov 83'	Stadium: Georgi Asparuhov; Attendance: 1,000; Referee: Ivaylo Stoyanov (Petrich)

25 October 2009 10	Sportist Svoge	2–3	Levski Sofia	Sofia
15:00 EEST	Simov 6'; Antonov 82' (pen.)	Report	Yovov 31'; Sarmov 69'; Krastovchev 86'	Stadium: Chavdar Tsvetkov; Attendance: 2,000; Referee: Georgi Yordanov (Gabrovo)

31 October 2009 11	Levski Sofia	3–1	Lokomotiv Mezdra	Sofia
19:30 EEST	Bardon 50'; Sarmov 64'; Krastovchev 66'	Report	Hazurov 40'	Stadium: Georgi Asparuhov; Attendance: 1,000; Referee: Ivaylo Stoyanov (Petrich)

8 November 2009 12	Pirin Blagoevgrad	0–2	Levski Sofia	Kyustendil
15:00 EEST		Report	Tasevski 32'; Krastovchev 90'	Stadium: Osogovo; Attendance: 2,000; Referee: Kolyo Danev (Varna)

21 November 2009 13	Levski Sofia	3–0	Cherno More	Sofia
19:30 EEST	Joãozinho 23'; Bardon 28' (pen.); Dimitrov 74'	Report		Stadium: Georgi Asparuhov; Attendance: 4,000; Referee: Aleksandar Kostadinov (Sofia)

28 November 2009 14	Levski Sofia	3–1	Montana	Sofia
19:30 EEST	Luiz Eduardo 26' (o.g.); Hristov 42'; Joãozinho 48'	Report	Beto 45'	Stadium: Georgi Asparuhov; Attendance: 2,000; Referee: Ivaylo Stoyanov (Petrich)

6 December 2009 15	Sliven	1–0	Levski Sofia	Sliven
14:00 EEST	Hristov 74'	Report		Stadium: Hadzhi Dimitar; Attendance: 4,000; Referee: Aleksandar Kostadinov (Sofia)

27 February 2010 16	Botev Plovdiv	0–3 (w/o)	Levski Sofia	Plovdiv
14:00 EEST				Stadium: Hristo Botev
Note: Match awarded due to excluding of Botev Plovdiv.

7 March 2010 17	Levski Sofia	3–1	Minyor Pernik	Sofia
15:00 EEST	Joãozinho 21', 90+3'; Bardon 90' (pen.)	Report	Iliev 13'	Stadium: Ovcha Kupel; Attendance: 6,000; Referee: Angel Angelov (Sofia)

14 March 2010 18	Litex Lovech	3–0	Levski Sofia	Lovech
19:30 EEST	Doka 30'; Popov 45'; Yanev 87'	Report		Stadium: Lovech; Attendance: 6,000; Referee: Stefan Spasov (Pernik)

20 March 2010 19	Levski Sofia	3–0	Slavia Sofia	Sofia
19:30 EEST	Reinette 21' (o.g.); Yovov 55'; Dimitrov 64'	Report		Stadium: Georgi Asparuhov; Attendance: 4,000; Referee: Georgi Yordanov (Gabrovo)

24 March 2010 20	Lokomotiv Sofia	2–0	Levski Sofia	Sofia
19:30 EEST	Atanasov 1'; Genkov 79'	Report		Stadium: Lokomotiv; Attendance: 5,000; Referee: Stanislav Todorov (Shumen)

27 March 2010 21	Levski Sofia	0–0	CSKA Sofia	Sofia
19:30 EEST		Report		Stadium: Vasil Levski; Attendance: 15,000; Referee: Anton Genov (Sofia)

4 April 2010 22	Chernomorets Burgas	1–1	Levski Sofia	Burgas
19:30 EEST	Krumov 68'	Report	Bardon 34' (pen.)	Stadium: Lazur; Attendance: 12,500; Referee: Hristo Ristoskov (Sandanski)

4 April 2010 23	Levski Sofia	2–0	Lokomotiv Plovdiv	Sofia
17:00 EEST	Petras 45'; Antonov 70'	Report		Stadium: Georgi Asparuhov; Attendance: 4,500; Referee: Kolyo Danev (Varna)

14 April 2010 24	Beroe	1–3	Levski Sofia	Stara Zagora
15:00 EEST	Ivanov 2'	Report	Dimitrov 5'; Antonov 16'; Yovov 30'	Stadium: Beroe; Attendance: 10,000; Referee: Anton Genov (Sofia)

17 April 2010 25	Levski Sofia	5–0	Sportist Svoge	Sofia
19:30 EEST	Antonov 22', 35'; Aleksandrov 49', 90'; Tasevski 64'	Report		Stadium: Georgi Asparuhov; Attendance: 1 000; Referee: Hristo Ristoskov (Sandanski)

20 April 2010 26	Lokomotiv Mezdra	1–1	Levski Sofia	Mezdra
15:00 EEST	Iliev 10'	Report	Baltanov 72'	Stadium: Lokomotiv; Attendance: 1,000; Referee: Georgi Yordanov (Gabrovo)

24 April 2010 27	Levski Sofia	2–0	Pirin Blagoevgrad	Sofia
17:30 EEST	Yovov 36', 44'	Report		Stadium: Georgi Asparuhov; Attendance: 1,000; Referee: Ahmed Ahmed (Aytos)

2 May 2010 28	Cherno More	1–1	Levski Sofia	Varna
17:30 EEST	Bozhilov 18'	Report	Gadzhev 83'	Stadium: Ticha; Attendance: 7,000; Referee: Nikolay Yordanov (Varna)

9 May 2010 29	Montana	0–2	Levski Sofia	Montana
17:30 EEST		Report	Aleksandrov 38'; Yovov 61'	Stadium: Ogosta; Attendance: 4,000; Referee: Stanislav Todorov (Shumen)

16 May 2010 30	Levski Sofia	2–0	Sliven	Sofia
17:30 EEST	Yovov 21'; Petras 73'	Report		Stadium: Georgi Asparuhov; Attendance: 3,000; Referee: Angel Angelov (Sofia)

=== Bulgarian Cup ===
9 December 2009 Second round	Brestnik	0–2	Levski Sofia	Bansko
14:00 EEST		Report	Dembele 26'; Miliev 69'	Stadium: St Petar; Attendance: 6,000; Referee: Tasko Taskov (Sofia))

13 December 2009 Third round	Cherno More	4–1	Levski Sofia	Varna
13:30 EEST	Iliev 29', 50'; Georgiev 45'; Dyakov 88'	Report	Milanov 39'; Rabeh (red card) 15'	Stadium: Ticha; Attendance: 2,500; Referee: Stanislav Stavrov

=== Europe ===
==== UEFA Champions League ====
===== Second qualifying round =====
15 July 2009 1st leg	Levski Sofia (Bulgaria)	4–0	(Andorra) Sant Julià	Sofia, Bulgaria
19:30 EEST	Tasevski 49'; Hristov 64', 72'; Gadzhev 82'	Report		Stadium: Georgi Asparuhov; Attendance: 10,000; Referee: Levan Paniashvili (Georgia)

21 July 2009 2nd leg	Sant Julià (Andorra)	0–5 (0−9 agg.)	(Bulgaria) Levski Sofia	Sant Julia de Loria, Andorra
17:00 WEST		Report	Ognyanov 23', 40'; Yovov 34'; Tsachev 83'; Kirov 87'	Stadium: Estadi Comunal d'Aixovall; Attendance: 200; Referee: Junni Huutia (Finland)

===== Third qualifying round =====
28 July 2009 1st leg	FK Baku (Azerbaijan)	0–0	(Bulgaria) Levski Sofia	Baku, Azerbaijan
17:00 WEST		Report		Stadium: Tofig Bakhramov; Attendance: 25,000; Referee: Sven Odvar Moen (Norway)

5 August 2009 2nd leg	Levski Sofia (Bulgaria)	2–0 (2−0 agg.)	(Azerbaijan) FK Baku	Sofia, Bulgaria
19:00 WEST	Yovov 64'; Hristov 80'	Report		Stadium: Georgi Asparuhov; Attendance: 15,000; Referee: Stefan Johannesson (Sweden)

===== Play-off round =====
19 August 2009 1st leg	Levski Sofia (Bulgaria)	1–2	(Hungary) Debrecen	Sofia, Bulgaria
21:45 WEST	Bardon 51'	Report	Bodnár 12'; Cvitkovics 76'	Stadium: Georgi Asparuhov; Attendance: 18,000; Referee: Laurent Duhamelle (France)

25 August 2009 2nd leg	Debrecen (Hungary)	2–0 (4−1 agg.)	(Bulgaria) Levski Sofia	Budapest, Hungary
21:45 WEST	Varga 13'; Rudolf 35'	Report		Stadium: Puskas Ferenc; Attendance: 30,000; Referee: Claus Bo Larsen (Denmark)

==== UEFA Europa League ====
===== Group stage =====
Pos	Team	Pld	W	D	L	GF	GA	GD	Pts	Qualification	SBG	VIL	LAZ	LS
1	(Austria) Red Bull Salzburg	6	6	0	0	9	2	+7	18	Advance to knockout phase	—	2–0	2–1	1–0
2	(Spain) Villarreal	6	3	0	3	8	6	+2	9	Advance to knockout phase	0–1	—	4–1	1–0
3	(Italy) Lazio	6	2	0	4	9	10	−1	6		1–2	2–1	—	0–1
4	(Bulgaria) Levski Sofia	6	1	0	5	1	9	−8	3		0–1	0–2	0–4	—

Source: Soccerway

17 September 2009 1	Villarreal (Spain)	1–0	(Bulgaria) Levski Sofia	Villarreal, Spain
21:05	Nilmar 72'	Report		Stadium: El Madrigal; Attendance: 5,244; Referee: Mike Dean (England)

1 October 2009 2	Levski Sofia (Bulgaria)	0–4	(Italy) Lazio	Sofia, Bulgaria
19:00		Report	Matuzalém 22'; Zárate 45+1'; Meghni 67'; Rocchi 74'	Stadium: Georgi Asparuhov; Attendance: 16,500; Referee: Nikolay Ivanov (Russia)

22 October 2009 3	Salzburg (Austria)	1–0	(Bulgaria) Levski Sofia	Salzburg, Austria
19:00	Švento 45+2'	Report		Stadium: Red Bull Arena; Attendance: 17,800; Referee: Hannes Kaasik (Estonia)

5 November 2009 4	Levski Sofia (Bulgaria)	0–1	(Austria) Salzburg	Sofia, Bulgaria
21:05		Report	Schiemer 90+3'	Stadium: Georgi Asparuhov; Attendance: 15,000; Referee: Cüneyt Çakır (Turkey)

2 December 2009 5	Levski Sofia (Bulgaria)	0–2	(Spain) Villarreal	Sofia, Bulgaria
19:00		Report	Rossi 36'; Senna 84'	Stadium: Georgi Asparuhov; Attendance: 5,000; Referee: Paul Allaerts (Belgium)

17 December 2009 6	Lazio (Italy)	0–1	(Bulgaria) Levski Sofia	Rome, Italy
21:05		Report	Yovov 61'	Stadium: Olimpico; Attendance: 3,000; Referee: William Collum (Scotland)
