= 2008–09 A Group =

85th season of top-tier football league in Bulgaria

A Group
- Season: 2008–09
- Dates: 9 August 2008 – 13 June 2009
- Champions: Levski Sofia (26th title)
- Relegated: Vihren; Spartak; Belasitsa
- Champions League: Levski
- Europa League: CSKA; Cherno More; Litex (via domestic cup)
- Matches: 240
- Goals: 619 (2.58 per match)
- Top goalscorer: Martin Kamburov (17 goals)
- Biggest home win: Cherno More 6–0 Belasitsa; Levski 6–0 Botev
- Biggest away win: Belasitsa 1–7 Levski
- Highest scoring: Vihren 3–5 Chernomorets; Belasitsa 1–7 Levski

The 2008–09 A Group was the 85th season of the Bulgarian national top football division, and the 61st of A Group as the top tier football league in the country. It began on 9 August 2008 and ended on 13 June 2009. CSKA Sofia were the defending champions, but they were unable to retain it and Levski Sofia won the title, which was their 26th overall.

== Promotion and relegation ==
Three teams were promoted from the 2007–08 B Group. These include the champions of the East and West B Groups, as well as the promotion playoff winner, decided through a one match between the runners-up of the two B Groups. The promoted teams were Lokomotiv Mezdra, Sliven, and Minyor Pernik. Lokomotiv Mezdra made their debut in the top tier of Bulgarian football, Sliven return after a fifteen-year absence, while Minyor Pernik return to the top tier after a seven-year absence. The promoted teams replaced Marek Dupnitsa, Vidima-Rakovski Sevlievo and Beroe Stara Zagora, who were relegated after respective top flight spells of seven, one, and four years in the A Group.

Teams promoted from B PFG after the 2007–08 season

- West group champions: Lokomotiv Mezdra
- East group champions: OFC Sliven
- Play-offs: Minyor Pernik

Teams relegated to B PFG after the 2007–08 season

- Vidima-Rakovski Sevlievo
- Marek Dupnitsa
- Beroe Stara Zagora

== Team overview ==
Location of teams in 2008–09 A Group
Sofia 2008–09 A Group football clubs

Club	Location	Manager	Venue	Capacity
Belasitsa	Petrich	(Bulgaria) Miroslav Mitev	Tsar Samuil Stadium	9,500
Botev	Plovdiv	(Bulgaria) Kostadin Angelov	Hristo Botev Stadium, Plovdiv	22,000
Cherno More	Varna	(Bulgaria) Nikola Spasov	Ticha Stadium	8,250
Chernomorets	Burgas	(Bulgaria) Dimitar Dimitrov	Naftex Stadium	18,037
CSKA	Sofia	(Bulgaria) Luboslav Penev	Balgarska Armiya Stadium	22,015
Levski	Sofia	(Bulgaria) Emil Velev	Georgi Asparuhov Stadium	29,800
Litex	Lovech	(Bulgaria) Stanimir Stoilov	Lovech Stadium	7,000
Lokomotiv Mezdra	Mezdra	(Bulgaria) Georgi Bachev	Lokomotiv Stadium, Mezdra	5,000
Lokomotiv Plovdiv	Plovdiv	(Bulgaria) Ayan Sadakov	Lokomotiv Stadium, Plovdiv	13,800
Lokomotiv Sofia	Sofia	(Serbia) Dragomir Okuka	Lokomotiv Stadium, Sofia	22,000
Minyor	Pernik	(Bulgaria) Dimitar Aleksiev	Minyor Stadium	16,500
OFC Sliven	Sliven	(Bulgaria) Georgi Dermendzhiev	Hadzhi Dimitar Stadium	10,000
Pirin	Blagoevgrad	(Bulgaria) Petar Tsvetkov	Hristo Botev Stadium, Blagoevgrad	7,500
Slavia	Sofia	(North Macedonia) Stevica Kuzmanovski	Ovcha Kupel Stadium	18,000
Spartak	Varna	(Serbia) Dragoljub Simonović	Spartak Stadium	8,000
Vihren	Sandanski	(Bulgaria) Filip Filipov	Sandanski Stadium	6,000

== League table ==
Pos	Team	Pld	W	D	L	GF	GA	GD	Pts	Qualification or relegation
1	Levski Sofia (C)	30	21	6	3	57	18	+39	69	Qualification for Champions League second qualifying round
2	CSKA Sofia	30	21	5	4	54	22	+32	68	Qualification for Europa League third qualifying round
3	Cherno More	30	18	6	6	48	19	+29	60	Qualification for Europa League second qualifying round
4	Litex Lovech	30	17	7	6	53	26	+27	58	Qualification for Europa League play-off round (Note: Litex Lovech won the 2008–09 Bulgarian Cup and qualified for the play-off round of the UEFA Europa League.)
5	Lokomotiv Sofia	30	16	6	8	52	29	+23	54	
6	Lokomotiv Plovdiv	30	12	7	11	40	43	−3	43 (Note: Lokomotiv Plovdiv ahead of Chernomorets Burgas on head-to-head record; Chernomorets Burgas–Lokomotiv Plovdiv 1–3, Lokomotiv Plovdiv–Chernomorets Burgas 1–1.)	
7	Chernomorets Burgas	30	11	10	9	41	37	+4	43	
8	Lokomotiv Mezdra	30	10	7	13	39	41	−2	37 (Note: Lokomotiv Mezdra ahead of Slavia Sofia on head-to-head record; Slavia Sofia–Lokomotiv Mezdra 0–0, Lokomotiv Mezdra–Slavia Sofia 1–0.)	
9	Slavia Sofia	30	11	4	15	41	38	+3	37	
10	Pirin Blagoevgrad	30	10	5	15	35	50	−15	35 (Note: Montana ahead of Slavia Sofia on head-to-head record; Minyor Pernik–Pirin Blagoevgrad 0–0, Pirin Blagoevgrad–Minyor Pernik 1–0.)	
11	Minyor Pernik	30	9	8	13	24	39	−15	35	
12	Sliven	30	8	8	14	32	40	−8	32	
13	Botev Plovdiv	30	8	6	16	31	50	−19	30	
14	Vihren (R)	30	8	2	20	29	50	−21	26	Relegation to 2009–10 B Group
15	Spartak Varna (R)	30	5	10	15	19	46	−27	25	Relegation to 2009–10 B Group
16	Belasitsa Petrich (R)	30	4	5	21	24	71	−47	17	Relegation to 2009–10 B Group

Source: A PFG (in Bulgarian)
Rules for classification: 1st points; 2nd head-to-head points; 3rd head-to-head goal difference; 4th head-to-head goals scored; 5th head-to-head away goals scored; 6th goal difference; 7th goals scored
(C) Champions; (R) Relegated

== Results ==
Home \ Away	BEL	BOT	CHM	CHB	CSK	LEV	LIT	LME	LPL	LSO	MIN	OFC	PIR	SLA	SPV	VIH
Belasitsa Petrich		0–2	2–0	0–1	0–3	1–7	1–1	1–3	1–2	2–4	0–0	2–1	1–4	2–5	0–0	1–2
Botev Plovdiv	5–0		2–2	0–1	0–2	0–1	1–1	3–1	2–2	0–4	1–2	1–3	1–0	2–1	1–0	3–1
Cherno More	6–0	1–0		0–1	1–0	0–0	0–0	2–0	2–1	1–0	4–0	3–0	1–0	2–0	5–0	2–0
Chernomorets Burgas	2–0	2–1	0–0		0–1	2–2	3–1	2–2	1–3	1–1	1–1	1–1	3–1	2–1	2–0	1–3
CSKA Sofia	1–0	2–1	1–1	2–1		0–2	2–0	2–1	2–0	1–0	2–0	3–0	4–1	2–1	3–0	2–0
Levski Sofia	2–0	6–0	3–0	3–1	1–1		2–0	3–1	1–0	0–3	1–1	1–0	2–0	1–0	5–0	3–2
Litex Lovech	4–1	5–1	1–0	2–2	1–0	1–2		2–1	3–0	2–1	2–0	2–0	3–0	0–1	2–1	2–0
Lokomotiv Mezdra	3–1	0–0	1–3	1–1	2–2	0–1	2–4		1–1	4–0	3–1	2–0	4–0	1–0	1–1	0–1
Lokomotiv Plovdiv	1–1	3–0	1–0	1–1	1–3	2–3	1–3	0–2		3–2	1–0	2–1	3–2	2–1	2–1	0–1
Lokomotiv Sofia	3–1	2–0	3–2	2–0	1–1	1–0	1–0	3–0	1–2		5–1	3–2	1–0	0–1	2–2	2–0
Minyor Pernik	0–3	1–0	2–2	1–0	0–1	0–2	0–0	2–0	2–2	0–1		0–2	0–0	1–0	3–1	3–2
OFC Sliven	0–2	3–1	0–1	0–0	3–1	0–0	2–2	2–0	1–1	0–0	0–1		2–1	1–1	0–1	2–0
Pirin Blagoevgrad	2–0	0–3	1–2	2–1	2–2	1–1	1–1	1–2	1–0	0–4	1–0	3–1		3–2	0–0	2–1
Slavia Sofia	3–0	4–0	0–2	2–0	1–2	0–1	0–3	0–0	2–0	2–2	1–1	3–1	2–3		1–2	2–0
Spartak Varna	0–0	0–0	0–1	0–3	0–2	0–1	0–4	2–0	1–1	0–0	1–0	2–2	2–0	1–2		1–1
Vihren	4–1	0–0	0–2	3–5	1–4	1–0	0–1	0–1	1–2	1–0	0–1	0–2	1–3	1–2	2–0	

Source: A PFG (in Bulgarian)
Legend: Blue = home team win; Yellow = draw; Red = away team win.

== Champions ==
Levski Sofia

Goalkeepers
1	(Bulgaria) Georgi Petkov	17	(0)
12	(Bulgaria) Bozhidar Mitrev	7	(0)
29	(Slovakia) Daniel Kiss	3	(0)
31	(Bulgaria) Tsvetan Dimitrov	3	(0)

Defenders
2	(Bulgaria) Viktor Genev	14	(0)
3	(Bulgaria) Zhivko Milanov	23	(2)
5	(Morocco) Youssef Rabeh	22	(0)
14	(Bulgaria) Veselin Minev	18	(0)
15	(Morocco) Chakib Benzoukane	3	(0)
20	(Czech Republic) David Bystroň	19	(2)
25	(Bulgaria) Lúcio Wagner	16	(0)
26	(Bulgaria) Martin Dimov	1	(0)
33	(Bulgaria) Stefan Stanchev	1	(0)
34	(Bulgaria) Dimitar Dimitrov	1	(0)
37	(Bulgaria) Simeon Ivanov	1	(0)
55	(Bulgaria) Yordan Miliev	4	(0)

Midfielders
4	(Bulgaria) Georgi Chakarov	2	(0)
6	(Morocco) Rachid Tiberkanine	14	(3)
8	(Bulgaria) Georgi Sarmov	21	(2)
16	(Bulgaria) Mariyan Ognyanov	1	(0)
17	(Bulgaria) Georgi Nedyalkov	1	(1)
18	(Bulgaria) Miroslav Ivanov	20	(0)
20	(Brazil) Joãozinho	19	(4)
21	(Brazil) Zé Soares	25	(3)
22	(North Macedonia) Darko Tasevski	23	(6)
24	(Bulgaria) Nikolay Dimitrov	17	(1)
30	(Bulgaria) Lachezar Baltanov	15	(0)
45	(Bulgaria) Vladimir Gadzhev	23	(1)
70	(Portugal) Filipe da Costa	8	(0)
	(Bulgaria) Boyan Iliev*	2	(0)

Forwards
7	(Brazil) Jean Carlos*	4	(1)
9	(Bulgaria) Georgi Ivanov	23	(12)
10	(Bulgaria) Hristo Yovov	11	(4)
11	(Bulgaria) Georgi Hristov	25	(11)
19	(Bulgaria) Ivan Tsachev	9	(4)
27	(Bulgaria) Enyo Krastovchev	3	(0)
32	(Bulgaria) Boyan Tabakov	1	(0)

Manager
(Bulgaria) Emil Velev

- Iliev and Jean Carlos left the club during a season.

== Top scorers ==
Rank	Scorer	Club	Goals
1	(Bulgaria) Martin Kamburov	Lokomotiv Sofia	17
2	(Bulgaria) Dormushali Saidhodzha	CSKA Sofia^{1}	14
3	(Bulgaria) Georgi Ivanov	Levski Sofia	12
4	(Bulgaria) Yordan Yurukov	Cherno More Varna	11
4	(Bulgaria) Georgi Hristov	Levski Sofia	11
6	(North Macedonia) Zoran Baldovaliev	Lokomotiv Sofia	10
6	(Serbia) Pavle Delibašić	Lokomotiv Plovdiv	10
6	(Brazil) Michel Platini	Chernomorets Burgas	10
9	(Bulgaria) Krum Bibishkov	Litex Lovech	9
9	(Argentina) Adrián Fernández	Chernomorets Burgas^{2}	9
9	(Bulgaria) Miroslav Manolov	Cherno More Varna	9
9	(Serbia) Saša Simonović	Lokomotiv Mezdra	9
9	(Bulgaria) Ivan Stoyanov	Sliven	9
9	(Bulgaria) Yordan Todorov	CSKA Sofia	9

^{1. Saidhodzha scored 7 goals for Botev Plovdiv and 7 for CSKA Sofia (he was transferred during the winter break)}
^{2. Fernández scored 4 goals for Cherno More Varna and 5 for Chernomorets Burgas (he was transferred during the winter break)}

== Annual awards ==
=== Team of the season ===
The team have been voted by selected media representatives (Note: First team members are denoted in bold).

A PFG Team of the season, first squad

Position	Name	Club
Goalkeepers	Kiril Akalski	Lokomotiv Plovdiv
Goalkeepers	**Georgi Petkov**	**Levski**
Defenders	Tanko Dyakov	Cherno More
Defenders	**Ivan Ivanov**	**CSKA**
Defenders	**Stanislav Manolev**	**Litex**
Defenders	Zhivko Milanov	Levski
Defenders	**Veselin Minev**	**Levski**
Defenders	**Youssef Rabeh**	**Levski**
Midfielders	**Alex**	**Cherno More**
Midfielders	**Joãozinho**	**Levski**
Midfielders	Dani Kiki	Lokomotiv Plovdiv
Midfielders	**Aleksandar Tonev**	**CSKA**
Midfielders	**Todor Yanchev**	**CSKA**
Midfielders	Kosta Yanev	Sliven
Forwards	Spas Delev	Pirin
Forwards	**Georgi Ivanov**	**Levski**
Forwards	**Martin Kamburov**	**Lokomotiv Sofia**
Forwards	Ivelin Popov	Litex
Head coach	**Emil Velev**	**Levski**

== Attendances ==
#	Club	Average attendance
1	Levski	5,967
2	Cherno More	5,289
3	Sliven	4,989
4	CSKA Sofia	4,272
5	Botev	4,158
6	Lokomotiv Plovdiv	3,667
7	Chernomorets	3,129
8	Minyor	2,720
9	Pirin	2,167
10	Varna	1,670
11	Lokomotiv Mezdra	1,433
12	Lovech	1,385
13	Slavia Sofia	1,343
14	Lokomotiv Sofia	1,333
15	Vihren	1,143
16	Belasitsa	1,129

== See also ==
- 2008–09 B Group
