= List of Bulgarian football transfers 2008–09 =

This is a list of Bulgarian football transfers for the 2008-09 season. Only moves from and/or to the Bulgarian "A" professional football group are listed.

== Summer transfer window ==
=== May ===
| Date | Name | Nat | Moving from | Moving to | Fee |
|---|---|---|---|---|---|
| May 2008 | Iliya Iliev | (Bulgaria) | Slavia | Lokomotiv Mezdra | Free |
| May 2008 | Fausto | (Portugal) | Académica | Lokomotiv Mezdra | Undisclosed |
| May 2008 | Dudu | (Brazil) | Clube do Remo | Chernomorets | Free |
| May 2008 | Martin Kovachev | (Bulgaria) | Dunav | Chernomorets | Undisclosed |
| May 2008 | Igor Tomašić | (Croatia) (Bulgaria) | Levski | Maccabi Tel Aviv | Free |

=== June ===
| Date | Name | Nat | Moving from | Moving to | Fee |
|---|---|---|---|---|---|
| June 2008 | Michel | (Brazil) | Araguaína | Chernomorets | Free |
| June 2008 | Svetoslav Dyakov | (Bulgaria) | Pirin | Lokomotiv Sofia | € 250,000 |
| June 2008 | David Bystroň | (Czech Republic) | Baník Ostrava | Levski | € 430,000 |
| June 2008 | Jeremy Acedo | (France) | Martigues | Litex | Undisclosed |
| June 2008 | Alexis Bertin | (France) | Gueugnon | Litex | Undisclosed |
| June 2008 | Mensur Kurtisi | (North Macedonia) | Parndorf 1919 | CSKA Sofia | Free |
| June 2008 | Tanko Dyakov | (Bulgaria) | Vihren | Cherno More | Free |
| June 2008 | Milen Petkov | (Bulgaria) | Ilisiakos | Cherno More | Free |
| June 2008 | Kiril Djorov | (Bulgaria) | Cherno More | Vihren | Free |
| June 2008 | Igor Bondžulić | (Serbia) | Javor Ivanjica | Lokomotiv Sofia | € 25,000 |
| June 2008 | Uroš Golubović | (Serbia) | Lokomotiv Sofia | Litex | Free |
| June 2008 | Kostadin Hazurov | (Bulgaria) | Litex | Minyor | € 350,000 |
| June 2008 | Rachid Tiberkanine | (Morocco) (Belgium) | FK Daugava | Levski | € 80,000 |
| June 2008 | Georgi Ivanov | (Bulgaria) | NK Rijeka | Levski | € 200,000 |
| June 2008 | Vladimir Gadzhev | (Bulgaria) | Panathinaikos | Levski | Loan |
| June 2008 | Radostin Stanev | (Bulgaria) | Spartak Varna | Lokomotiv Mezdra | Free |
| June 2008 | Georgi Hristov | (Bulgaria) | Botev | Levski | Free |
| June 2008 | Daniel Peev | (Bulgaria) | Rodopa | Pirin | € 100,000 |
| June 2008 | Peycho Deliminkov | (Bulgaria) | Beroe | Minyor | Free |
| June 2008 | David Silva | (Portugal) | G.D. Tourizense | Lokomotiv Mezdra | Undisclosed |
| June 2008 | Rui Miguel | (Portugal) | G.D. Tourizense | Lokomotiv Mezdra | Undisclosed |
| June 2008 | Hristo Gospodinov | (Bulgaria) | Belasitsa | Minyor | Free |
| June 2008 | Martin Toshev | (Bulgaria) | 1. FC Köln | CSKA Sofia | Free |
| June 2008 | Vladislav Zlatinov | (Bulgaria) | Lokomotiv Plovdiv | CSKA Sofia | |
| June 2008 | Ivaylo Ivanov | (Bulgaria) | Ilisiakos | Minyor | Free |
| June, 2008 | Nikolay Hristozov | (Bulgaria) | Vihren | Lokomotiv Mezdra | Free |
| June 2008 | Ilko Pirgov | (Bulgaria) | CSKA Sofia | CS Otopeni | € 100,000 |
| June 2008 | Velizar Dimitrov | (Bulgaria) | CSKA Sofia | Metalurh Donetsk | € 450,000 |
| June 2008 | Ivaylo Petrov | (Bulgaria) | CSKA Sofia | AEK Larnaca | € 50,000 |
| June 2008 | Aleksandar Tomash | (Bulgaria) | Cherno More | FK Baku | Free |
| June 2008 | Kuncho Kunchev | (Bulgaria) | Spartak Varna | Prefab 05 Modelu | Free |
| June 2008 | Stanislav Genchev | (Bulgaria) | Litex | FC Vaslui | Undisclosed |
| June 2008 | Nebojša Jelenković | (Serbia) (Bulgaria) | Litex | Spartak Trnava | Undisclosed |
| June 2008 | Marcho Dafchev | (Bulgaria) | Lokomotiv Sofia | Neftchi Baku | € 250,000 |
| June 2008 | Alfred Mapoka | (Cameroon) | TP-47 | Botev | Free |
| June 2008 | Cedric Uras | (France) | Litex | Neuchâtel Xamax | Free |
| June 2008 | Iskren Pisarov | (Bulgaria) | Vidima-Rakovski | Lokomotiv Plovdiv | € 20,000 |
| June 2008 | Zoran Janković | (Serbia) (Bulgaria) | Litex | Ethnikos Achna | Undisclosed |
| June 2008 | Malin Orachev | (Bulgaria) | Lokomotiv Sofia | Naftex | Free |
| June 2008 | Mihail Avrionov | (Bulgaria) | Etar | Lokomotiv Mezdra | Free |
| June 2008 | Jiří Lenko | (Czech Republic) | Superfund | Lokomotiv Mezdra | Undisclosed |
| June 2008 | Yordan Yurukov | (Bulgaria) | CSKA Sofia | Cherno More | € 100,000 |
| June 2008 | Georgi Iliev | (Bulgaria) | CSKA Sofia | Cherno More | € 150,000 |
| June 2008 | Jamie Phoenix | (England) | Sabah FA | Slavia | Free |
| June 2008 | Marko Muslin | (France) | Lokomotiv Sofia | Slavia | Free |
| June 2008 | Stefan Donchev | (Bulgaria) | Lokomotiv Sofia | Spartak Varna | Free |

=== July ===
| Date | Name | Nat | Moving from | Moving to | Fee |
|---|---|---|---|---|---|
| July 2008 | Aleksandar Tunchev | (Bulgaria) | CSKA Sofia | Leicester | € 1,000,000 |
| July 2008 | Lyubomir Bozhinov | (Bulgaria) | Naftex | Chernomorets | € 50,000 |
| July 2008 | Emil Trenkov | (Bulgaria) | Vihren | Lokomotiv Mezdra | Free |
| July 2008 | Florentin Petre | (Romania) | CSKA Sofia | Terek Grozny | € 300,000 |
| July 2008 | Daniel Mladenov | (Bulgaria) | Marek | Pirin | Free |
| July 2008 | Evgheni Hmaruc | (Moldova) | Persija Jakarta | Cherno More | Free |
| July 2008 | Milan Janković | (Austria) (Bosnia and Herzegovina) | SKN St. Pölten | Lokomotiv Mezdra | Free |
| July 2008 | Aristeidis Lottas | (Greece) | Olympiacos | Lokomotiv Mezdra | Free |
| July 2008 | Desislav Rusev | (Bulgaria) | Spartak Varna | Rodopa | € 30,000 |
| July 2008 | Alexandre Barthe | (France) | Rodez AF | Litex | Undisclosed |
| July 2008 | Pavle Popara | (Serbia) | Enosis Paralimni | Slavia | Free |
| July 2008 | Lee Hyung-Sang | (South Korea) | S.C. Beira-Mar | Spartak Varna | Free |
| July 2008 | Daniel Morales | (Brazil) | Lokomotiv Plovdiv | Spartak Varna | Free |
| July 2008 | Slavcho Georgievski | (North Macedonia) | Zhejiang Lücheng | Slavia | Free |

=== August ===
| Date | Name | Nat | Moving from | Moving to | Fee |
|---|---|---|---|---|---|
| August 2008 | Ilian Chilibonov | (Bulgaria) | Haskovo | Spartak Varna | Free |
| August 2008 | Enco Malindi | (Albania) | Slavia | Spartak Varna | € 50,000 |
| August 2008 | Adrián Gustavo Fernández | (Argentina) | FC St. Gallen | Cherno More | € 100,000 |
| August 2008 | Boyan Iliev | (Bulgaria) | Spartak Varna | Levski | Free |
| August 2008 | Eli Marques | (Brazil) | Belasitsa | CSKA Sofia | € 80,000 |
| August 2008 | Viktors Morozs | (Latvia) | Skonto Riga | CSKA Sofia | Free |
| August 2008 | Mitja Morec | (Slovenia) | Maccabi Herzliya | CSKA Sofia | Free |
| August 2008 | Spas Bayraktarov | (Bulgaria) | Lokomotiv Mezdra | Spartak Varna | Undisclosed |
| August 2008 | Yuri Ivanov | (Bulgaria) | Lokomotiv Mezdra | Spartak Varna | Undisclosed |
| August 2008 | Anton Kostadinov | (Bulgaria) | Lokomotiv Mezdra | Spartak Varna | Undisclosed |
| August 2008 | Martin Toshev | (Bulgaria) | 1. FC Köln | CSKA Sofia | Undisclosed |
| August 2008 | Vladislav Zlatinov | (Bulgaria) | Lokomotiv Plovdiv | CSKA Sofia | Undisclosed |

=== September ===
| Date | Name | Nat | Moving from | Moving to | Fee |
|---|---|---|---|---|---|
| September 2008 | Zdravko Lazarov | (Bulgaria) | Shinnik Yaroslavl | CSKA Sofia | Free |

=== October ===
| Date | Name | Nat | Moving from | Moving to | Fee |
|---|---|---|---|---|---|
| October 2008 | Vladimir Manchev | (Bulgaria) | none | CSKA Sofia | Free |

== Winter transfer window ==
=== December ===
| Date | Name | Nat | Moving from | Moving to | Fee |
|---|---|---|---|---|---|
| December 2008 | David Silva | (Portugal) | PFC Lokomotiv Mezdra | CSKA Sofia | ? |
| December 2008 | Rui Miguel | (Portugal) | PFC Lokomotiv Mezdra | CSKA Sofia | ? |
| December 2008 | Dormushali Saidhodzha | (Bulgaria) | PFC Botev Plovdiv | CSKA Sofia | € 50,000 |

=== January ===
| Date | Name | Nat | Moving from | Moving to | Fee |
|---|---|---|---|---|---|
| January 2009 | Yordan Miliev | (Bulgaria) | PFC Lokomotiv Plovdiv | Levski Sofia | € 50,000 |
| January 2009 | Filipe da Costa | (Portugal) | CSKA Sofia | Levski Sofia | Free |
