= Joãozinho (footballer, born 1988) =

Brazilian-Russian footballer

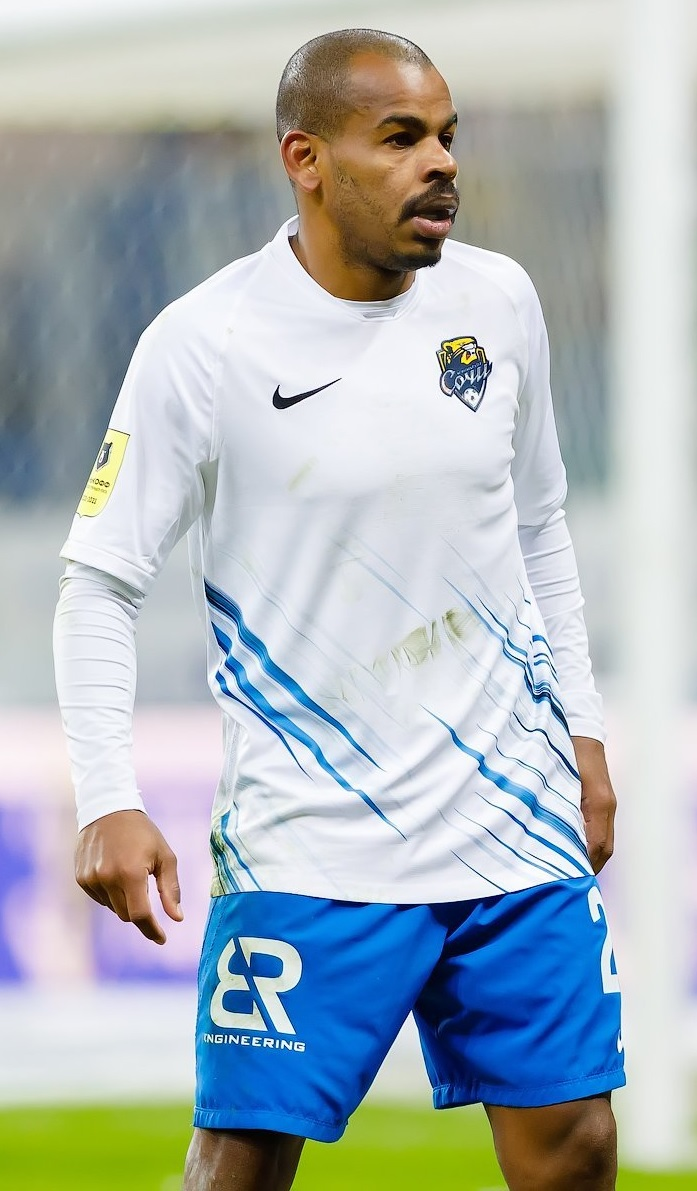
- Joãozinho with PFC Sochi in 2021

Personal information
- Full name: João Natailton Ramos dos Santos
- Date of birth: 25 December 1988 (age 37)
- Place of birth: Umbaúba, Brazil
- Height: 1.65 m (5 ft 5 in)
- Position: Winger

Youth career
- Portuguesa

Senior career*
Years	Team	Apps	(Gls)
2006–2007	Portuguesa	54	(4)
2007–2011	Levski Sofia	73	(12)
2011–2018	Krasnodar	177	(29)
2018–2020	Dynamo Moscow	49	(6)
2020–2023	Sochi	66	(7)
2023	Novorizontino	5	(0)
2024–2026	Brasiliense	33	(10)
- * Club domestic league appearances and goals

João Natailton Ramos dos Santos or simply Joãozinho (Russian: Жоао Натаилтон Рамос Дос Сантос; born 25 December 1988) is a Brazilian former professional footballer who played as a right or left winger.

== Career ==
=== Levski Sofia ===
He signed his five-year-contract with Levski Sofia on 7 December 2007. The same day he made his first training with his new club. Joãozinho made his unofficial debut in a friendly match against FC Dynamo Kyiv on 20 January 2008. He played for 45 minutes. Levski lost the match with a result of 1–2.

His initial number was supposed to be 20, but when Hristo Yovov left Levski Sofia there were no troubles for Joãozinho to play with number 10.

He scored his first goal for Levski on 10 February 2008 in a friendly match against FC Rapid București. Joãozinho scored a penalty kick. Joãozinho made his official debut for Levski on 24 February 2008 in a match against Chernomorets Burgas, the match from Bulgarian A PFG. Levski won the match. The result was 2–1, after goals from Jean Carlos and Daniel Borimirov. He scored his first goal for Levski on 22 March 2008 against Belasitsa Petrich in the 87th minute, making the result 4-0 for Levski. He directed the ball into the net after a shot by Darko Tasevski which was going out of the goalkeeper's frame.

He became a Champion of Bulgaria in 2009. He was also honoured with a fairplay award for 2009 due to not receiving a single booking in the A PFG during that year.

=== Krasnodar ===
On 30 January 2011, after days of speculations, Joãozinho revealed that he had moved to Krasnodar. In early February 2011, the transfer was finalized and the Brazilian signed his contract with the Russian club. On 6 February 2011, Joãozinho made his unofficial debut for the team from Krasnodar, playing the first 63 minutes in the 2–2 draw with Ukrainian side SC Tavriya Simferopol in a friendly match. On 15 February 2011, he scored a goal and provided an assist in the 4–0 rout against Czech club FK Baumit Jablonec. Joãozinho's official debut came on 6 March 2011 in the 1–0 win against Amkar Perm in a Russian Cup match, with the Brazilian being in the starting line-up. His Russian Premier League debut occurred 6 days later in the 0–0 away draw with FC Anzhi Makhachkala. On 14 June 2011, the Brazilian opened his account for the team, netting twice in the 4–2 home win against Volga Nizhny Novgorod. He suffered a broken foot in a March 2015 match. He left Krasnodar at the end of the 2017–18 season.

=== Dynamo Moscow ===
On 23 July 2018, he signed a one-year contract with FC Dynamo Moscow. On 10 June 2019, he extended his contract for another year with an option to extend it for the 2020–21 season as well.

=== Sochi ===
On 11 August 2020, he signed with Sochi. Joãozinho left Sochi in June 2023.

=== Novorizontino ===
On 29 July 2023, Joãozinho returned to Brazil after 16 years in Europe and joined Novorizontino.

=== Retirement ===
Joãozinho announced his retirement from playing in February 2026.

== Career statistics ==
As of 27 November 2022

Club	Season	League			Cup		Continental		Total	
Club	Season	Division	Apps	Goals	Apps	Goals	Apps	Goals	Apps	Goals
PFC Levski Sofia	2007–08	Bulgarian A Group	12	2	1	0	–		13	2
PFC Levski Sofia	2008–09	Bulgarian A Group	19	4	4	1	2	1	25	6
PFC Levski Sofia	2009–10	Bulgarian A Group	27	4	1	0	10	0	38	4
PFC Levski Sofia	2010–11	Bulgarian A Group	15	2	2	0	12	2	29	4
PFC Levski Sofia	Total		73	12	8	1	24	3	105	16
FC Krasnodar	2011–12	Russian Premier League	39	7	2	0	–		41	7
FC Krasnodar	2012–13	Russian Premier League	30	4	1	0	–		31	4
FC Krasnodar	2013–14	Russian Premier League	30	9	4	0	–		34	9
FC Krasnodar	2014–15	Russian Premier League	19	6	2	2	8	3	29	11
FC Krasnodar	2015–16	Russian Premier League	14	0	3	1	6	1	23	2
FC Krasnodar	2016–17	Russian Premier League	21	1	1	0	11	5	33	6
FC Krasnodar	2017–18	Russian Premier League	24	2	1	0	1	0	26	2
FC Krasnodar	Total		177	29	14	3	26	9	217	41
FC Dynamo Moscow	2018–19	Russian Premier League	30	4	1	0	–		31	4
FC Dynamo Moscow	2019–20	Russian Premier League	19	2	0	0	–		19	2
FC Dynamo Moscow	Total		49	6	1	0	–		50	6
PFC Sochi	2020–21	Russian Premier League	23	1	2	1	–		25	2
PFC Sochi	2021–22	Russian Premier League	20	3	1	0	1	0	22	3
PFC Sochi	2022–23	Russian Premier League	14	2	5	1	–		19	3
PFC Sochi	Total		57	6	8	2	1	0	66	8
Career total			356	53	31	6	51	12	438	71

== Honours ==
=== Club ===
Levski Sofia

- A PFG (1): 2009
- Bulgarian Supercup (1): 2009

=== Individual ===
- Russian Premier League – Krasnodar fans' and footballers' player of the season: 2013–2014
- List of 33 top players of the Russian league: 2013/14.

== Personal life ==
In August 2016, he received Russian citizenship.

Joãozinho is dating the Russian model Lera Yalovets. In the fall of 2017 the couple announced that they are expecting their first child.
