= Tsachev =

Tsachev (Bulgarian: Цачев) is a Bulgarian masculine surname, its feminine counterpart is Tsacheva. Notable people with the surname include:

- Ivan Tsachev (born 1989), Bulgarian footballer
- Tsetska Tsacheva (born 1958), Bulgarian jurist and politician
