= Dániel Kiss =

Dániel Kiss may refer to:

- Daniel Kiss (footballer) (born 1984), Slovak goalkeeper
- Dániel Kiss (hurdler) (born 1982), Hungarian hurdler

== See also ==
- Kiss Daniel (born 1994), Nigerian singer
- Danilo Kiš (1935–1989), Serbian writer
