= Aleksandar Kirov =

Bulgarian footballer

Personal information
- Full name: Aleksandar Kirilov Kirov
- Date of birth: 25 October 1990 (age 36)
- Place of birth: Sofia, Bulgaria
- Height: 1.81 m (5 ft 11 in)
- Positions: Forward; midfielder

Team information
- Current team: Lokomotiv GO
- Number: 8

Senior career*
Years	Team	Apps	(Gls)
2007–2012	Levski Sofia	15	(0)
2010	→ Lokomotiv Mezdra (loan)	9	(1)
2013	Spartak Pleven	9	(3)
2013	Botev Vratsa	10	(0)
2014–2015	Montana	21	(10)
2016	Tsarsko Selo	8	(0)
2017	Andorf		
2017–	Lokomotiv GO	7	(2)

International career
2009–2010	Bulgaria U21	2	(0)
- * Club domestic league appearances and goals as of 19:11, 5 December 2017 (UTC)

Aleksandar Kirov (Bulgarian: Александър Киров; born 25 October 1990) is a Bulgarian footballer who plays as a forward for Lokomotiv GO.

== Career ==
=== Youth career ===
He comes directly from Levski Sofia`s Youth Academy. Kirov made his official debut for Levski's "A" Team on 22 September 2007 against Cherno More Varna. Kirov played as a sub and entered the match in 67th minute. Levski won by the result of 4:0, but Kirov didn't score a goal.

=== PFC Levski Sofia ===
Kirov made his seasonly debut for Levski in the beginning of the 09/10 season on 21 July 2009 in the second match of the 2nd Qualifying round of UEFA Champions League, where Levski defeated the team of UE Sant Julià. The result of the match was 0:5 with a guest win for Levski. Kirov scored the fifth goal in the 87th minute.

On 9 June 2010, Kirov returned to PFC Levski Sofia after a loan period.

==== PFC Lokomotiv Mezdra ====
On 12 January 2010, Kirov was transferred to PFC Lokomotiv Mezdra on loan for six months. He made his debut for the team on 13 March 2010. Kirov scored 1 goal in 9 matches. After a season spent there, he started training for the next one with PFC Levski Sofia.

=== Tsarsko Selo ===
Kirov played for Tsarsko Selo in the first half of the 2016–17 Second League season but was released in December 2016.

=== Lokomotiv GO ===
In July 2017, Kirov joined Lokomotiv Gorna Oryahovitsa.

== Career stats ==
As of 12 June 2011.

Club	Season	League		Cup		Europe		Total	
Club	Season	Apps	Goals	Apps	Goals	Apps	Goals	Apps	Goals
Levski Sofia	2007–08	1	0	0	0	0	0	1	0
Levski Sofia	2008–09	0	0	0	0	0	0	0	0
Levski Sofia	2009–10	0	0	0	0	1	1	1	1
Levski Sofia	2010–11	14	0	0	0	6	0	20	0
Career totals		15	0	0	0	7	1	22	1
