= Bulgarian Doubles Football Group =

- Founded: 2008
- Folded: 2010
- Country: Bulgaria
- Confederation: UEFA
- Number of clubs: 16
- Most championships: PFC Levski Sofia B & PFC Litex Lovech B (1)

The Bulgarian Doubles Football Group (Bulgarian: Дублираща футболна група) was a Bulgarian football reserve team league. It existed for just two seasons – 2008–09 and 2009–10.

The 16 clubs that used to form the Doubles Groups were the 16 reserve teams of the clubs currently playing in the Bulgarian A Professional Football Group (A Group). They played their matches each Monday following the official fixtures of A Group but with a reverse home team (if Club A entertains Club B in their A Group match, Club B entertains Club A in their Doubles Groups match).

== League tables ==
=== Season 2008–09 ===
Pos	Team	Pld	W	D	L	GF	GA	GD	Pts
1	Levski Sofia B (Note: Levski Sofia made a double league win as the club's first team also won the respective A Group season.)	30	21	4	5	91	34	+57	67
2	CSKA Sofia B	30	20	6	4	73	30	+43	66
3	Pirin Blagoevgrad B	30	19	5	6	87	40	+47	62
4	Litex Lovech B	30	18	4	8	69	40	+29	58
5	Slavia Sofia B	30	17	6	7	68	42	+26	57
6	Chernomorets Burgas B	30	17	4	9	83	46	+37	55
7	Cherno More Varna B	30	14	5	11	45	50	−5	47
8	Lokomotiv Mezdra B	30	13	6	11	67	71	−4	45
9	Lokomotiv Plovdiv B	30	13	3	14	73	67	+6	42
10	Lokomotiv Sofia B	30	12	4	14	51	60	−9	40
11	Sliven B	30	11	4	15	54	65	−11	37
12	Vihren Sandanski B (Note: The clubs lose their places in next season's Doubles Football Group as their first teams were relegated during the 2008–09 A Group season.)	30	10	3	17	55	72	−17	33
13	Botev Plovdiv B	30	9	2	19	67	73	−6	29
14	Minyor Pernik B	30	6	1	23	36	96	−60	19
15	Spartak Varna B	30	5	3	22	25	101	−76	18
16	Belasitsa Petrich B	30	2	6	22	15	72	−57	12

Source: Bulgarian-football.com
Rules for classification: 1st points; 2nd head-to-head matches; 3rd goal difference; 4th number of goals scored.

=== Season 2009–10 ===
Pos	Team	Pld	W	D	L	GF	GA	GD	Pts
1	Litex Lovech B (Note: Litex Lovech made a double league win as the club's first team also won the respective A Group season.)	30	24	2	4	83	22	+61	74
2	Sliven B	30	20	3	7	74	36	+38	63
3	Levski Sofia B	30	19	5	6	85	22	+63	62
4	Cherno More Varna B	30	19	4	7	60	32	+28	61
5	Pirin Blagoevgrad B	30	17	5	8	65	46	+19	56
6	Beroe Stara Zagora B	30	16	6	8	61	31	+30	54
7	Slavia Sofia B	30	14	7	9	52	37	+15	49
8	CSKA Sofia B	30	14	6	10	62	36	+26	48
9	Chernomorets Burgas B	30	13	4	13	51	42	+9	43
10	Sportist Svoge B (Note: The clubs lose their places in next season's Doubles Football Group as their first teams were relegated during the 2009–10 A Group season.)	30	8	6	16	39	68	−29	30
11	Lokomotiv Mezdra B	30	8	5	17	46	87	−41	29 (Note: Head-to-head: LMZ 3–1 MON; MON 0–3 LME; LME 6–0 MIN; MIN 2–3 LME; MON 6–0 MIN; MIN 4–0 MON)
12	Montana B	30	9	2	19	43	69	−26	29
13	Minyor Pernik B	30	9	2	19	55	86	−31	29
14	Lokomotiv Plovdiv B	30	7	7	16	48	68	−20	28
15	Lokomotiv Sofia B	30	8	3	19	47	98	−51	27
16	Botev Plovdiv B	30	1	1	28	13	104	−91	4 (Note: In February 2010 Botev Plovdiv were expelled from both A Group and Doubles Group because they were unable to meet the criteria required to continue the season. All of their remaining matches of the second half of the season were counted as a 3–0 win for their opponents.)

Source: Bulgarian-football.com
Rules for classification: 1st points; 2nd head-to-head matches; 3rd goal difference; 4th number of goals scored.
