= Tsvetan Dimitrov =

Bulgarian footballer

Personal information
- Full name: Tsvetan Iliev Dimitrov
- Date of birth: 10 February 1987 (age 39)
- Place of birth: Sofia, Bulgaria
- Height: 1.89 m (6 ft 2 in)
- Position: Goalkeeper

Team information
- Current team: Lyubimets 2007
- Number: 12

Youth career
- 1997–2006: Levski Sofia

Senior career*
Years	Team	Apps	(Gls)
2006–2010	Levski Sofia	8	(0)
2006–2007	→ Chavdar BS (loan)	13	(0)
2011–2012	Kaliakra Kavarna	25	(0)
2012–2013	Neftochimic 1986	13	(1)
2013–	Lyubimets 2007	2	(0)
- * Club domestic league appearances and goals as of 27 July 2013

Tsvetan Dimitrov (Bulgarian: Цветан Димитров; born 10 February 1987) is a Bulgarian footballer, who currently plays as a goalkeeper for Lyubimets 2007.

== Career ==
=== Chavdar Byala Slatina ===
During 2006–2007 season, Tsvetan played in B PFG for Chavdar Byala Slatina on loan. On that period he became famous with that he safe a penalty of Bulgarian football star Velizar Dimitrov in 1/16 final for Bulgarian Cup.

=== Levski Sofia ===
He comes from Levski Sofia`s Youth Academy. After a short loan to Chavdar Byala Slatina, the head coach of Levski Sofa – Stanimir Stoilov invited the youth keeper and he started trainings with his mother club on 12 November 2007. He made his redebut for Levski Sofia on 16 November 2007 in a friendly against Vihren Sandanski. On 3 January 2008 the young goalkeeper signed his first professional contract with Levski for three years.

He became a Champion of Bulgaria in 2009, after a contradictory but great season under the coaching of Emil Velev. Despite the bad results during the autumnal part of the season, after great matches in the spring, Levski Sofia fulfilled the plan before the term had set and became a champion for 26 time, before the last round has been played.

In 2009/2010 season, after couple of bad games and results, Levski however achieved qualifying for UEFA Europa League becoming 3rd in the final ranking.

During the 2010/2011 Levski qualified for UEFA Europa League after eliminating Dundalk F.C., Kalmar FF and AIK Fotboll. Levski was drawn in Group C, facing Gent, Lille and Sporting CP.

=== Kaliakra Kavarna ===
On 21 December 2010 Tzvetan signed a 1.5 year contract with the team from Kavarna.

== Career stats ==
As of 2 September 2010.

Club	Season	League		Cup		Europe		Total	
Club	Season	Apps	Goals	Apps	Goals	Apps	Goals	Apps	Goals
Levski Sofia	2008–09	3	0	0	0	0	0	3	0
Levski Sofia	2009–10	5	0	0	0	1	0	6	0
Levski Sofia	2010–11	0	0	0	0	0	0	0	0
Kaliakra Kavarna	2010–11	0	0	0	0	0	0	0	0
Career totals		8	0	0	0	1	0	9	0

== Awards ==
- Champion of Bulgaria 2009 (with PFC Levski Sofia)
- Champion of B PFG 2013 (with Neftochimic Burgas)
