= Georgi Nedyalkov =

Bulgarian footballer

Personal information
- Date of birth: 2 November 1989 (age 37)
- Place of birth: Elin Pelin, Bulgaria
- Height: 1.78 m (5 ft 10 in)
- Position: Midfielder

Youth career
- 1999–2008: Levski Sofia

Senior career*
Years	Team	Apps	(Gls)
2009–2010	Levski Sofia	1	(1)
2009	→ Sportist Svoge (loan)	0	(0)
2010	→ Kom-Minyor (loan)	14	(0)
2011	Sliven 2000	7	(0)
2011–2012	Calisia Kalisz	22	(0)
2016–2018	Elin Pelin		
- * Club domestic league appearances and goals

Georgi Nedyalkov (Bulgarian: Георги Недялков; born 2 November 1989) is a Bulgarian former professional footballer who played as a midfielder.

== Career ==
=== Levski Sofia ===
Nedyalkov comes directly from Levski Sofia's youth academy. After the creation of the second team of Levski, he became a part of the newly formed PFC Levski Sofia B. During the first season of the 'B' league, Levski became a champion.

Nedyalkov made his debut for Levski's senior team on 13 June 2009 in a match against Pirin Blagoevgrad. The result of the match was a 1–1 draw, with Nedyalkov scoring the sole goal for Levski in the 76th minute.

==== Sportist Svoge ====
On 3 July 2009, it was announced that Nedyalkov would be playing on loan for Sportist Svoge during the 2009–10 season.

== Honours ==
Levski Sofia

- First Professional Football League: 2008–09
