= Martin Dimov (footballer, born 1986) =

Bulgarian footballer

Personal information
- Full name: Martin Stoyanov Dimov
- Date of birth: 1 March 1986 (age 40)
- Place of birth: Sofia, Bulgaria
- Height: 1.91 m (6 ft 3 in)
- Position: Centre back

Youth career
- –2005: Levski Sofia

Senior career*
Years	Team	Apps	(Gls)
2005–2010	Levski Sofia	19	(0)
2005–2008	→ Rodopa Smolyan (loan)	60	(3)
2009–2010	→ Sportist Svoge (loan)	24	(1)
2010–2011	Kaliakra Kavarna	27	(0)
2011–2012	Botev Plovdiv	1	(0)
2012	Montana	2	(0)
2012–2013	Lyubimets 2007	14	(0)
2013	Vitosha Bistritsa	9	(0)
2014	Chernomorets Burgas	10	(0)
2014–2015	Dunav Ruse	28	(5)
2015–2016	Oborishte	22	(1)
2016	Botev Vratsa	15	(2)
2017–2018	Tsarsko Selo	30	(1)
- * Club domestic league appearances and goals as of 26 May 2018

Martin Dimov (Bulgarian: Мартин Димов; born 1 March 1986) is a Bulgarian football manager and former footballer.

== Career ==
=== Levski Sofia ===
In 2005, he was loaned by Levski Sofia to Rodopa Smolyan. In 2008, he returned to Levski Sofia. Back at the Gerena stadium, coaching staff were amazed by his performance and skills at his young age.

After an injury, Dimov played mainly for the second team during the 08/09 season.

Dimov became a Champion of Bulgaria in 2009, after a contradictory but great season under the coaching of Emil Velev. Despite the bad results during the autumnal part of the season, after great matches in the spring, Levski Sofia fulfilled the plan before the term had set and became a champion for 26 time, before the last round has been played. Dimov was a substitute the whole season.

On 9 June 2010 he returned to Levski, after a season out on loan.

==== Sportist Svoge ====
On 27 June 2009 it was announced that Dimov would be play on loan for FC Sportist Svoge during 2009/2010 season. As of the 2009/10 season, Martin capped 24 times for Sportist, scoring 1 goal. On 9 June 2010 he returned Levski.

=== Kaliakra Kavarna ===
On 8 July 2010 it became clear that Martin will continue his career in PFC Kaliakra Kavarna.

=== Tsarsko Selo Sofia ===
On 20 December 2016, Martin joined Tsarsko Selo.

== Awards ==
- Champion of Bulgaria 2009
