= Vladimir Rzhevsky =

Russian footballer and coach

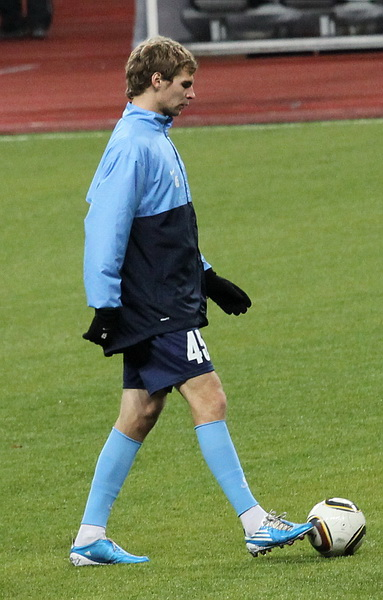

Personal information
- Full name: Vladimir Petrovich Rzhevsky
- Date of birth: 19 July 1987 (age 39)
- Place of birth: Zheleznovodsk, Russian SFSR
- Height: 1.95 m (6 ft 5 in)
- Position: Defender

Team information
- Current team: BATE Borisov (youth coach)

Youth career
- Mashuk Pyatigorsk

Senior career*
Years	Team	Apps	(Gls)
2003	Kosmos Yegoryevsk	1	(0)
2004	Master-Saturn Yegoryevsk		
2005–2006	Energiya Shatura		
2007	Jakobstad		
2008–2010	BATE Borisov	24	(2)
2010	Krylia Sovetov Samara	0	(0)
- * Club domestic league appearances and goals

Vladimir Petrovich Rzhevsky (Russian: Владимир Петрович Ржевский; born 19 July 1987) is a former Russian footballer.

== Career ==
Rzhevsky played as a defender. On 13 August 2008, Rzhevsky scored the decisive goal for BATE Borisov against Levski Sofia in the third round qualifying for the 2008-09 UEFA Champions League season. Rzhevsky also played in Finland for Jakobstad before he joined BATE in 2008.

== Coaching career ==
Ending his career in 2012 after a series of injuries, Rzhevsky began taking a coaching license. In August 2015, he returned to BATE Borisov as a youth coach. As of June 2019, he was still working for the club.
