= Simeon Ivanov (footballer) =

Bulgarian footballer

Personal information
- Full name: Simeon Ivanov
- Date of birth: 8 February 1990 (age 36)
- Place of birth: Sofia, Bulgaria
- Height: 1.95 m (6 ft 5 in)
- Position: Defender

Team information
- Current team: Balkan Botevgrad
- Number: 30

Youth career
- Levski Sofia

Senior career*
Years	Team	Apps	(Gls)
2007–2010	Levski Sofia	2	(0)
2010–2011	Rayo Vallecano B	1	(0)
2012	Akademik Sofia	11	(1)
2012–2013	Lyubimets	12	(0)
2013	Vitosha Bistritsa	8	(0)
2014	Botev Vratsa	26	(1)
2015	Dobrudzha	30	(2)
2016	Neftochimic	8	(0)
2016–2018	Etar	28	(3)
2018	→ Lokomotiv GO (loan)	21	(1)
2019	Hebar	16	(1)
2019–2020	Sportist Svoge	17	(2)
2020–	Balkan Botevgrad	25	(0)

International career
- Bulgaria U19
2010–2011	Bulgaria U21	2	(0)
- * Club domestic league appearances and goals as of 15 November 2021

Simeon Ivanov (born 8 February 1990) is a Bulgarian footballer who currently plays for Balkan Botevgrad as a defender.

== Career ==
=== Levski Sofia ===
Ivanov made his debut for Levski's first team on 16 May 2007 in a match against Lokomotiv Plovdiv.

He became a part of the newly formed second team, PFC Levski Sofia B and won the title of the first season of the 'B' league.

=== Rayo Vallecano ===
On 1 February 2010, Ivanov signed with Spanish side Rayo Vallecano.

=== Return to Bulgaria ===
In February 2012, Ivanov was close to signing with A PFG club Vidima Rakovski, but eventually put pen to paper on a contract with second division side Akademik Sofia.
