= Krasimir Georgiev =

Bulgarian footballer

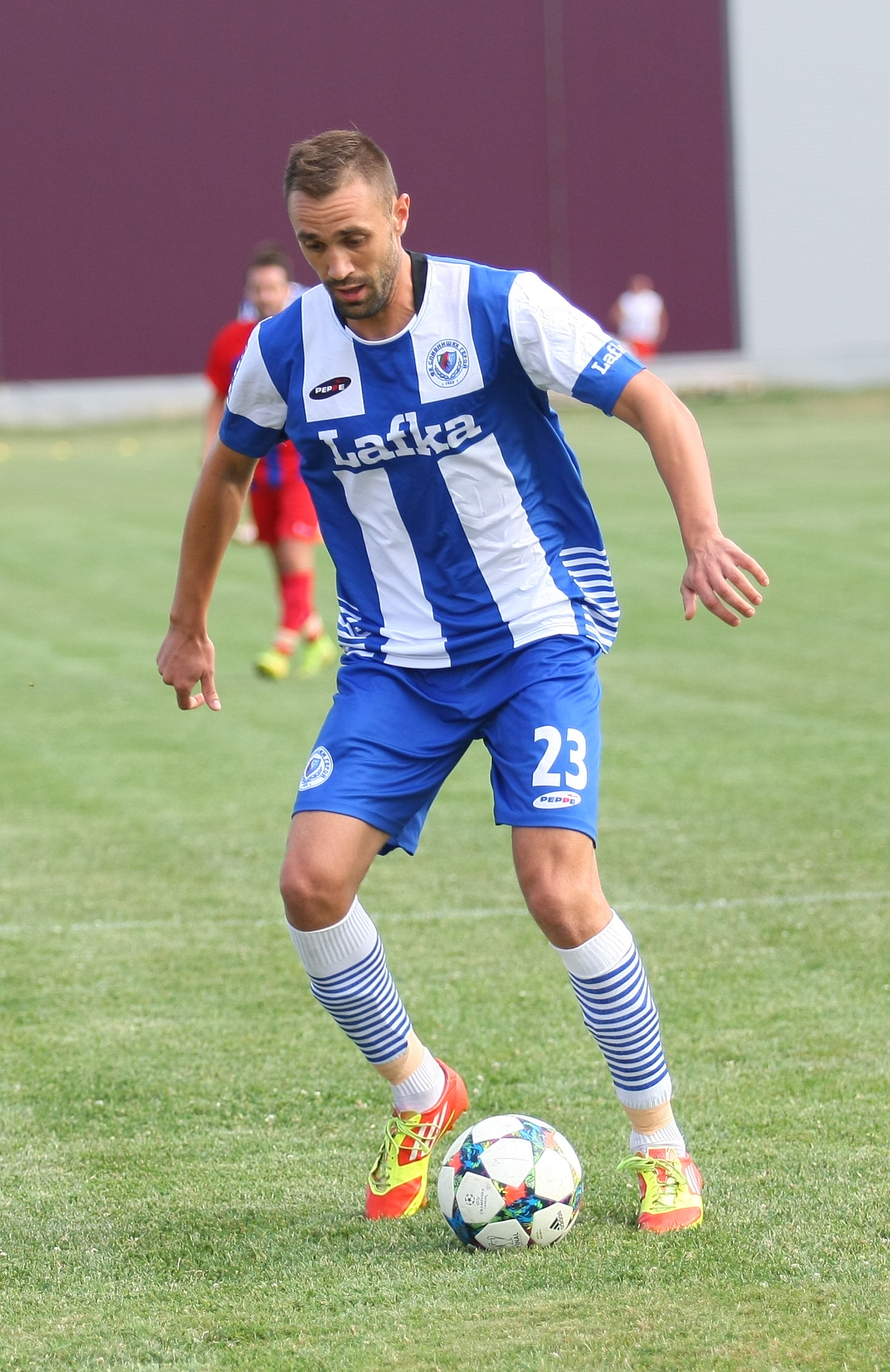

Personal information
- Full name: Krasimir Aleksandrov Georgiev
- Date of birth: 23 April 1986 (age 40)
- Place of birth: Sofia, Bulgaria
- Height: 1.84 m (6 ft 0 in)
- Position: Forward

Team information
- Current team: FC Slivnishki geroi

Youth career
- Litex Lovech

Senior career*
Years	Team	Apps	(Gls)
2004–2007	Litex Lovech	2	(0)
2005–2006	→ Vidima-Rakovski (loan)	13	(0)
2006–2007	→ Spartak Pleven (loan)	22	(5)
2007–2009	Lokomotiv Mezdra	38	(10)
2009–2010	Vihren Sandanski	24	(5)
2014–	FC Slivnishki geroi		
- * Club domestic league appearances and goals as of 08-09-2015

Krasimir Georgiev (Bulgarian: Красимир Георгиев) (born 23 April 1986) is a Bulgarian footballer who is currently playing for FC Slivnishki geroi as a forward.
