= Spas Bayraktarov =

Bulgarian footballer

Personal information
- Full name: Spas Angelov Bayraktarov
- Date of birth: 7 May 1988 (age 38)
- Place of birth: Plovdiv, Bulgaria
- Height: 1.77 m (5 ft 10 in)
- Position: Midfielder

Youth career
- –2004: Botev Plovdiv
- 2004–2007: Levski Sofia

Senior career*
Years	Team	Apps	(Gls)
2007–2008	Lokomotiv Mezdra	11	(1)
2008	Spartak Varna	11	(0)
2009	Volov Shumen	6	(0)
2009–2010	Vihren Sandanski	1	(0)
2010–2011	Botev Vratsa	15	(0)
2011	Levski 2007		
2012	Asenovets		
2012–2013	Eurocollege		
- * Club domestic league appearances and goals

Spas Bayraktarov (Bulgarian: Спас Байрактаров; born 7 May 1988) is a Bulgarian footballer who plays as a midfielder.

== Career ==
Bayraktarov was raised in Levski Sofia's youth teams. Born in Plovdiv, he moved to Sofia at the age of 15. In June 2007 he signed his first professional contract with Lokomotiv Mezdra. One year later he moved to Varna and signed with local team Spartak. Bayraktarov made his debut in the A PFG in a game against Lokomotiv Mezdra on 9 August 2008. He played for 64 minutes. The result of the match was a 2–0 win for Spartak. In 2010, he moved to Botev Vratsa.
