= Boyan Tabakov =

Bulgarian footballer

Personal information
- Full name: Boyan Zafirov Tabakov
- Date of birth: 2 February 1990 (age 36)
- Place of birth: Haskovo, Bulgaria
- Height: 1.80 m (5 ft 11 in)
- Position: Striker

Youth career
- Levski Sofia

Senior career*
Years	Team	Apps	(Gls)
2009–2011	Levski Sofia	2	(0)
2010	→ Loko Mezdra (loan)	12	(0)
2010–2011	→ Lyubimetz 2007 (loan)	21	(4)
- * Club domestic league appearances and goals as of 30 May 2011

Boyan Tabakov (Bulgarian: Боян Табаков) (born on 2 February 1990) is a Bulgarian footballer.

== Career ==
=== Levski ===
Tabakov came directly from Levski Sofia's Youth Academy. On 25 January 2008 Tabakov signed a three-year professional contract with Levski Sofia.

His first senior goal was on 27 February 2008, against Akademik Sofia, which was scored it at 64th minute. The match ended with a 3:0 result for Levski. His first official match was on 9 April 2008 against Marek Dupnitsa. Tabakov entered the match in the 54th minute, with a resulting 0:4 guest win for Levski.

On 10 September 2009 Tabakov started training with the first team. On the next day, he signed his new contract with Levski, connecting him with the team until 2013. He returned to Levski on 9 June 2010 after a short period on loan.

==== Lokomotiv Mezdra ====
On 11 January 2010, Tabakov was sent to Lokomotiv Mezdra on loan for six months. He returned to Levski on 9 June 2010.

==== Lyubimetz 2007 ====
On 29 July 2010, Tabakov was sent to Lyubimetz 2007 on loan.
