= Filipe da Costa =

Portuguese footballer

Personal information
- Full name: Filipe Gui Paradela Maciel da Costa
- Date of birth: 30 August 1984 (age 42)
- Place of birth: Lisbon, Portugal
- Height: 1.80 m (5 ft 11 in)
- Position: Midfielder

Youth career
- 1994–2002: Benfica
- 1999–2001: → Belenenses (loan)
- 2001–2002: → Amora (loan)
- 2002–2003: Braga

Senior career*
Years	Team	Apps	(Gls)
2003–2004	Reggiana	0	(0)
2005–2007	Ionikos	49	(5)
2007	→ AEL (loan)	4	(0)
2007–2008	Leeds United	4	(0)
2008	Politehnica Timișoara	0	(0)
2008	CSKA Sofia	5	(0)
2009	Levski Sofia	8	(0)
2009–2010	Nacional	0	(0)
2010–2011	Estoril	3	(0)
2011–2012	Panserraikos	19	(1)
2012–2013	Enosis Neon	8	(0)
2013	Panserraikos	18	(4)
2013–2014	Veria	3	(0)
2014–2015	Panachaiki	24	(5)
2015–2016	Panserraikos	4	(0)
2016–2017	Olympiakos Volos	0	(0)
2017	AEEK INKA	0	(0)
Total		149	(15)

International career
2002	Portugal U18	1	(0)
- * Club domestic league appearances and goals

Filipe Gui Paradela Maciel da Costa (born 30 August 1984) is a Portuguese retired footballer who played as a midfielder.

== Football career ==
=== Early career ===
Born in Lisbon, Costa began his career at S.L. Benfica, also being loaned to C.F. Os Belenenses and Amora F.C. during his formative years.

In 2003, he moved to Italy's A.C. Reggiana 1919, but failed to appear in any games in the season's Serie C1/A.

=== Greece ===
In January 2005, Costa joined Super League Greece club Ionikos FC. Exactly two years later he was loaned to Athlitiki Enosi Larissa FC, which eventually won the domestic cup as the player appeared in one match in the tournament, the 31 January quarter-finals against PAE Kerkyra.

During his two-and-a-half-year stay in the country, Costa was voted by fans and league players and coaches for two consecutive years to the annual All-Star game, held between the best Greek and foreign players.

=== England / Romania ===
On 1 September 2007, Costa signed a one-year contract with Leeds United. He made seven appearances, all but one as a substitute, and was sent off in a rare start, a game against Bury for the Football League Trophy; his injuries otherwise largely prevented him from playing.

In mid-January 2008, Costa joined Scottish club Falkirk for a trial, but returned to Elland Road after this proved unsuccessful. He was released in April.

For the 2008–09 campaign, Costa moved to Romania with FC Politehnica Timișoara, with the contract including a special clause that stated it could be terminated if the player suffered an injury. He was released on 4 August 2008.

=== Bulgaria ===
In September 2008, Costa signed for PFC CSKA Sofia. He made his debut for his new team on 4 October against FC Vihren Sandanski, playing a total of five matches during the season. In January of the following year CSKA released the player, via arbitration commission of the Bulgarian Football Union.

On 28 January 2009, Costa joined PFC Levski Sofia on a three-year deal. He made his competitive debut also against Vihren, in the first game of the second round of the championship, a 3–2 win. On 9 May he appeared in The Eternal Derby against ex-team CSKA, which resulted in a 2–0 away win; in total, he contributed with eight appearances for an eventual league win.

On 21 June 2009, it was announced that Levski were trying to sell Costa. Club coach Emil Velev decided to sell the player due to his poor performances in the second round of the campaign.

=== Return to Portugal ===
On 13 July 2009, Costa returned to Portugal after six years, joining C.D. Nacional. He was not registered for the season's UEFA Europa League by the Madeirans and, on 5 January 2010, without making any official appearances, he was released, quickly signing with G.D. Estoril Praia in the Segunda Liga.

== Honours ==
Larissa

- Greek Football Cup: 2006–07

Levski

- First Professional Football League: 2008–09
