= Zé Soares =

Brazilian footballer (born 1983)

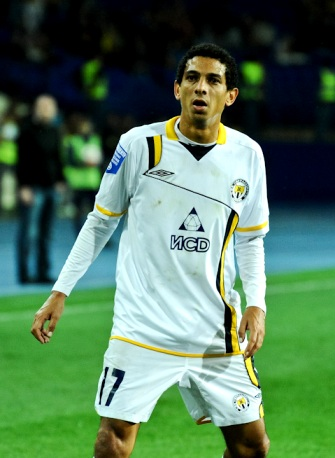
- Ze Soares in Metalurg

Personal information
- Full name: José Soares da Silva Filho
- Date of birth: 27 July 1983 (age 43)
- Place of birth: Paulo Afonso, Brazil
- Height: 1.73 m (5 ft 8 in)
- Positions: Striker; winger

Senior career*
Years	Team	Apps	(Gls)
2000–2004	Palmeiras		
2005	Luverdense		
2006	São Bento		
2006	Sorocaba		
2007	Remo		
2007	Sorocaba		
2007	Remo		
2007–2010	Levski Sofia	100	(9)
2010–2013	Metalurh Donetsk	79	(7)
2014	Remo		
2016	Itabaiana	2	(0)
- * Club domestic league appearances and goals

José Soares da Silva Filho or simply Zé Soares (born 27 July 1983) is a Brazilian former professional footballer.

== Career ==
=== Levski Sofia ===
Zé Soares was bought by Levski Sofia from Clube do Remo. On 6 November 2007, he made his unofficial debut for Levski Sofia in a friendly match against PFC Haskovo. Zé Soares did not score a goal, but played very well and made an assist for Levski's first goal in the match. On 9 November 2007, he received his employment permit. He was registered at BFU and was ready to play in the championship. The week after his unofficial debut (against FC Haskovo), Zé Soares was included in the group for the match against Chernomorets Burgas (match on Saturday 10 November 2007). Anyway, the football match Levski vs. Chernomorets was postponed due to bad weather (this match was played later on 24 February 2008 and Levski won it). He made his official debut for PFC Levski Sofia in the match against Lokomotiv Sofia on 24 November 2007. Zé Soares was a substitute so he entered the game in the 61st minute. The Brazilian wing played very well, but the match ended in a 0:0 draw. His second appearance was in Bulgaria's "Eternal Derby" match against CSKA Sofia. Levski lost by 0:1. Zé Soares was a substitute but he played very good again. His first match for Levski in the starting eleven was against Slavia Sofia. Zé Soares played awesome but the stadium's awful condition declined the fast and creative Levski player so the match ended in a goalless draw. Zé Soares scored his first goal for Levski on 22 March 2008 in a match against Belasitsa Petrich. He scored the goal in the 40th minute. The result of the match was 4:0 with a home victory for Levski. Zé made his debut in Europe on 13 August 2008 in a match against FC BATE Borisov. He entered the match as a substitute. Levski lost the match 0:1. Da Silva was scouted by FC Kuban Krasnodar during the winter pause of Bulgarian League. He has played one friendly match as a right fullback, and Kuban won. On 9 May 2009, Zé Soares assisted for the first goal of Levski Sofia in The Eternal Derby against CSKA and later scored the second. The result of the match was 0:2 with a guest win for Levski. Filho was eventually chosen to be the man of the match, rated 8.5 (max. 10). Later, in a match of the oldest Metropolitan Derby against Slavia Sofia, Zé Soares was again the man of the match scoring the only and winning goal in 51st minute. The fans applauded him and after second metropolitan derby in which Soares was again the man of the match, he became a fans' favourite. He became a Champion of Bulgaria in 2009, after a contradictory but great season under the coaching of Emil Velev. Despite the bad results during the autumnal part of the season, after great matches in the spring, Levski Sofia fulfilled the plan before the term had set and became a champion for 26th time, before the last round has been played. Zé Soares was rumored to play his last match with Levski on 2 December 2009 against Villarreal CF. The fans stretched a transparent, which showed their gratitude for Soares' games for Levski. Before, he left Bulgaria, Zé told that he had never met such a great audience like Levski's one. Soares was expected to sign with Metalurg Donetsk. However, the transfer did not become a fact and Filho kept playing for Levski until 15 January 2010 when he became a Metalurg Donetsk for a transfer fee of €450,000 and signed a 3.5-year deal.

=== Metalurh Donetsk ===
On 15 January 2010, Zé Soares was bought by Metalurh Donetsk for a transfer fee of €450,000. He signed a 3 1/2-year contract. During the end of the season, Filho made 15 appearances, scoring 2 goals. He was also a regular for the team during the 2010/2011 season in the Ukrainian Premier League.

== Playing style ==
Zé Soares is a right foot dominant player who plays as a right winger, or second striker, and is known for his fast dribbling. His speed and good techniques often make him unstoppable for the defenders.

== Club career statistics ==
This statistic includes domestic league, domestic cup and European tournaments.

Season	Team	Division	Apps	Goals
2011–12	Metalurg Donetsk	1	21	0
2010–11	Metalurg Donetsk	1	24	2
2009–10	Metalurg Donetsk	1	15	2
2009–10	Levski Sofia	1	27	2
2008–09	Levski Sofia	1	32	3
2007–08	Levski Sofia	1	21	2

Last update: 16 March 2012

== Trivia ==
- Ze Soares became a father of a girl, called Maria-Alisi, born on 16 January 2008 by his girlfriend Alini in the town of Paulo Afonso, Brazil. The happy father treated his teammates for the joyful event.
- He firstly started in Levski Sofia with a kit number 19, but when weeks later Elin Topuzakov left the team, Ze Soares chose to play with number 11. Later, his kit number was changed again to 21.
- During second part of 08/09 season, Zé Soares became the man of the match in the derbies against CSKA Sofia and Slavia Sofia, scoring 2 goals and doing 1 assistance (total of 3 goals). This made him a favourite of 'the blue' fans.

== Awards ==
- Champion of Bulgaria 2009
- Supercup champion of Bulgaria 2009
