= Ivan Tsachev =

Bulgarian footballer

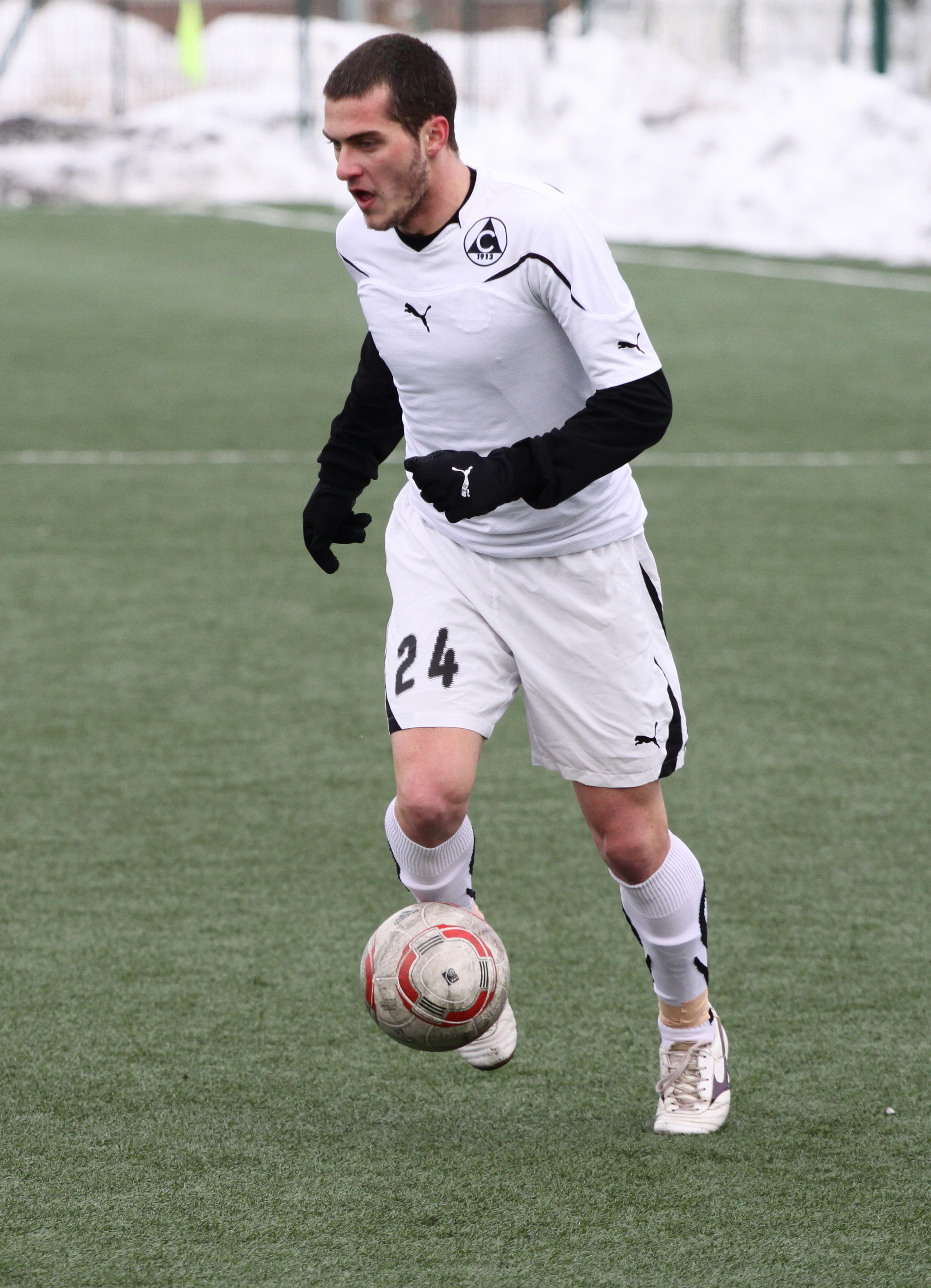

Personal information
- Full name: Ivan Evgeniev Tsachev
- Date of birth: 18 January 1989 (age 37)
- Place of birth: Varna, Bulgaria
- Height: 1.74 m (5 ft 8 1/2 in)
- Positions: Forward; winger

Team information
- Current team: Chernomorets Balchik
- Number: 21

Youth career
- Spartak Varna
- 2003–2008: Levski Sofia

Senior career*
Years	Team	Apps	(Gls)
2009–2010	Levski Sofia	12	(4)
2009	→ Pirin (loan)	12	(2)
2010–2011	Slavia Sofia	15	(1)
2011–2012	Kaliakra	40	(3)
2013	Spartak Varna	9	(2)
2013–2014	Dobrudzha	39	(7)
2015	Montana	11	(2)
2015–2016	Neftochimic	19	(0)
2016–2017	Nesebar	23	(7)
2017–2018	Botev Galabovo	23	(7)
2018–2019	Nesebar	26	(5)
2019–2020	Neftochimic	19	(2)
2020–2021	Dobrudzha	26	(2)
2021–2022	Ustrem Donchevo		
2022–	Chernomorets Balchik		

International career
- Bulgaria U19
2008–2009	Bulgaria U21		
- * Club domestic league appearances and goals as of 26 March 2022

Ivan Tsachev (Bulgarian: Иван Цачев; born 18 January 1989) is a Bulgarian footballer who plays as a forward for Chernomorets Balchik.

== Career ==
=== Youth career ===
As a young, Tsachev trained at Spartak Varna's youth academy.

=== Levski Sofia ===
Tsachev made his debut for the senior team during the second part of 2008–09 season. Soon after, on 26 April 2009, Tsachev scored his first goal for Levski Sofia's seniors against Belasitsa Petrich. The result of the match was 1:7 with a guest win for Levski.

On 17 May 2009, Tsachev scored his first hat-trick for the senior team, in the game against Spartak Varna after entering in 65th minute. The result of the match was a 5:0 home win for Levski. He became a Champion of Bulgaria in 2009.

Tsachev made his debut in Europe on 21 July 2009 in the second match of the 2nd Qualifying round of UEFA Champions League, where Levski beaten the team of UE Sant Julià 5:0. Tsachev scored the fourth goal in the 83rd minute.

=== Pirin Blagoevgrad ===
On 2 August 2009, Tsachev was loaned for one year to Pirin Blagoevgrad together with his teammate Stefan Stanchev. He made his debut against Litex Lovech, scoring in the process.

In the next round Pirin Blagoevgrad had a home game against Slavia Sofia. Tsachev started as a titular and scored again in the 47th minute to lead the "eagles" to a 1–0 victory.

=== Return to Levski Sofia ===
For the second part of 2009–10 season he returned to Levski Sofia. Tsachev made his official return on 20 March 2010 against Slavia Sofia. He entered the match as a substitute in 62nd minute. The result was 3–0 and Levski won the match.

=== Slavia Sofia ===
On 25 May 2010, it was officially announced that Tsachev had been bought by Slavia Sofia, where the new coach was Tsachev's former coach and the one who had given him his debut at Levski Sofia - Emil Velev.

=== Kaliakra ===
In 2011, Tsachev joined Kaliakra Kavarna. He scored his first league goal for the club on 18 April 2012, in a 7–1 away loss against Cherno More.

=== Botev Galabovo ===
On 3 July 2017, Tsachev signed with Botev Galabovo.

=== Nesebar ===
In June 2018, Tsachev returned to Nesebar.

== Club career statistics ==
This statistic includes domestic league only

Season	Team	Country	Division	Apps	Goals
2013–	Dobrudzha Dobrich	Bulgaria	2	0	0
2013	Spartak Varna	Bulgaria	2	9	2
2012	Kaliakra Kavarna	Bulgaria	2	13	2
2011–12	Kaliakra Kavarna	Bulgaria	1	27	1
2010–11	Slavia Sofia	Bulgaria	1	15	1
2009–10	Levski Sofia	Bulgaria	1	3	0
2009–10	Pirin Blagoevgrad	Bulgaria	1	12	2
2008–09	Levski Sofia	Bulgaria	1	9	4

Last update: 20 June 2013

== Honours ==
=== Club ===
Levski Sofia

- A PFG (1): 2008–09
