= Darko Tasevski =

Macedonian footballer

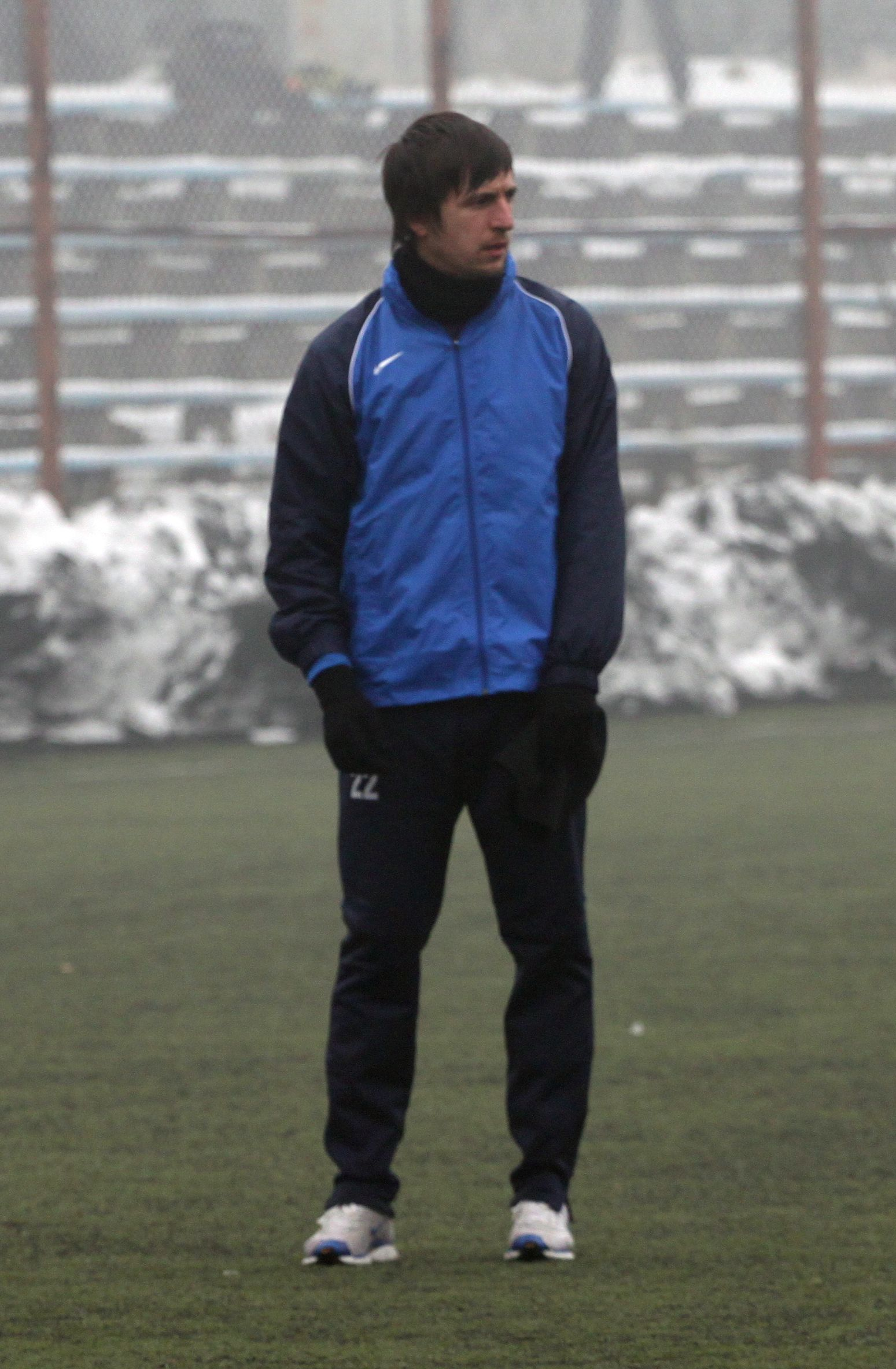

Personal information
- Full name: Darko Tasevski
- Date of birth: 20 May 1984 (age 42)
- Place of birth: Skopje, SR Macedonia, SFR Yugoslavia
- Height: 1.84 m (6 ft 1/2 in)
- Position: Attacking midfielder

Team information
- Current team: Levski Sofia (assistant)

Youth career
- 1991–2002: Vardar

Senior career*
Years	Team	Apps	(Gls)
2002–2003	Cementarnica	24	(1)
2003–2005	Vardar	53	(7)
2005–2007	Metalurh Zaporizhzhia	33	(1)
2007–2012	Levski Sofia	108	(21)
2012–2013	Ironi Kiryat Shmona	45	(2)
2014–2016	Bangkok Glass	77	(21)
2016	Suphanburi	12	(3)
2017–2018	Khon Kaen	25	(12)
2019–2023	Slavia Sofia	52	(2)
Total		429	(70)

International career
2001–2003	Macedonia U19	7	(0)
2002–2006	Macedonia U21	13	(1)
2005–2013	Macedonia	45	(1)

Managerial career
- 2023–2024: Slavia Sofia (assistant)
- 2024: Levski Sofia (assistant)
- 2025–: Levski Sofia (assistant)
- * Club domestic league appearances and goals

Darko Tasevski (Macedonian: Дарко Тасевски; Bulgarian: Дарко Тасевски; born 20 May 1984) is a Macedonian and Bulgarian retired professional footballer who played as a midfielder.

== International career ==
He made his senior debut for Macedonia in an October 2005 FIFA World Cup qualification match against the Netherlands and has earned a total of 45 caps, scoring 1 goal. His final international was an October 2013 World Cup qualification match against Wales.

=== Levski Sofia ===
Tasevski played in a derby match against Litex Lovech on 27 September 2008 and scored two goals. The final result was 2:0 with a home win for Levski Sofia.

On 17 May 2009, Tasevski scored a goal in the 44th second of the match against PFC Spartak Varna. The result of the match was 5:0 with a home win for Levski. He became a Champion of Bulgaria in 2009.

On 15 July 2009 he opened his goal account for the new season with a goal in the first official match for Levski during 2009/2010 season. The event took place in the 2nd Qualifying round of UEFA Champions League, where Levski beaten the team of UE Sant Julià. The result of the match was 4:0 with a home win for Levski.

On 25 October 2010, he was sent off in the 1:2 away loss against Litex Lovech. Tasevski re-signed his contract with PFC Levski Sofia on 11 January 2011. The new contract keeps him in the team until the summer of 2012.

=== Ironi Kiryat Shmona ===
He has been announced as a future signing for F.C. Ironi Kiryat Shmona in the 2012 summer transfer window.

=== Suphanburi ===
In June 2016 after 2 and half years with Bangkok Glass Tasevski joined Suphanburi, reuniting with former coach Ricardo Rodríguez. However, he left the club at the end of the season after his contract expired.

=== Slavia Sofia ===
In January 2019 Tasevski returned to Bulgaria, agreeing terms with Slavia Sofia.

== Coaching career ==
He started his coaching career at the end of 2023 at Slavia. Since the summer of 2024, he has been an assistant coach in the representative team of Levski and won the Bulgarian football championship title for the 2025/26 season.

=== International goals ===
#	Date	Venue	Opponent	Score	Result	Competition
1.	14 November 2012	Philip II Arena, Skopje, Macedonia	Slovenia	1–0	3–2	International Friendly

== Honours ==
Cementarnica

- Macedonian Cup: 2002–03

Levski Sofia

- Bulgarian A Group: 2008–09
- Bulgarian Supercup (2): 2007, 2009

Bangkok Glass

- Thai FA Cup: 2014
