= Boyan Iliev =

Bulgarian footballer

Personal information
- Full name: Boyan Kirchev Iliev
- Date of birth: 21 August 1982 (age 44)
- Place of birth: Varna, Bulgaria
- Height: 1.83 m (6 ft 0 in)
- Positions: Defender; midfielder

Youth career
- Spartak Varna

Senior career*
Years	Team	Apps	(Gls)
2001–2005	Spartak Varna	35	(0)
2002–2003	→ Svetkavitsa (loan)	?	(?)
2005	Naftex Burgas	4	(0)
2006–2008	Spartak Varna	68	(1)
2008	Levski Sofia	2	(0)
2009–2010	Spartak Varna	24	(0)
2010	Lokomotiv Plovdiv	10	(0)
2011–2013	Spartak Varna	40	(6)
2014	Kaliakra Kavarna	7	(0)
2015	Glyfada		
2015	Kalamata		
2016	Farkadona		
2016	Eordaikos		
2017	Levski Karlovo	13	(0)
2018–2020	Spartak Varna	48	(6)
- * Club domestic league appearances and goals as of 15 December 2019

Boyan Iliev (Bulgarian: Боян Илиев; born 21 August 1982) is a Bulgarian former football defender and midfielder. He was raised in Spartak Varna's youth teams.

== Career ==
=== Levski Sofia ===
On 2 August 2008 he was transferred to PFC Levski Sofia.

Later, on 5 August 2008, Boyan played in a match against German vice-champion Werder Bremen. He started the match, but he was injured in 33rd minute. He left the match. Anyway, his injury wasn't heavy and Boyan signed his 3-year-contract with Levski on the next day.

Boyan made his official debut for Levski on 13 August 2008 in a match against FC BATE Borisov. He played very well, but Levski lose the match. The result was 0:1 with a home lost.

On 7 December 2008 he was dismissed from Levski and told he was free to look around for a new team. A few days later Iliev returned to his hometown club Spartak Varna.

=== Levski Karlovo ===
In January 2017, Iliev returned to Bulgaria and joined Levski Karlovo.
