= Yordan Miliev =

Bulgarian footballer

Yordan Miliev Йордан Милиев
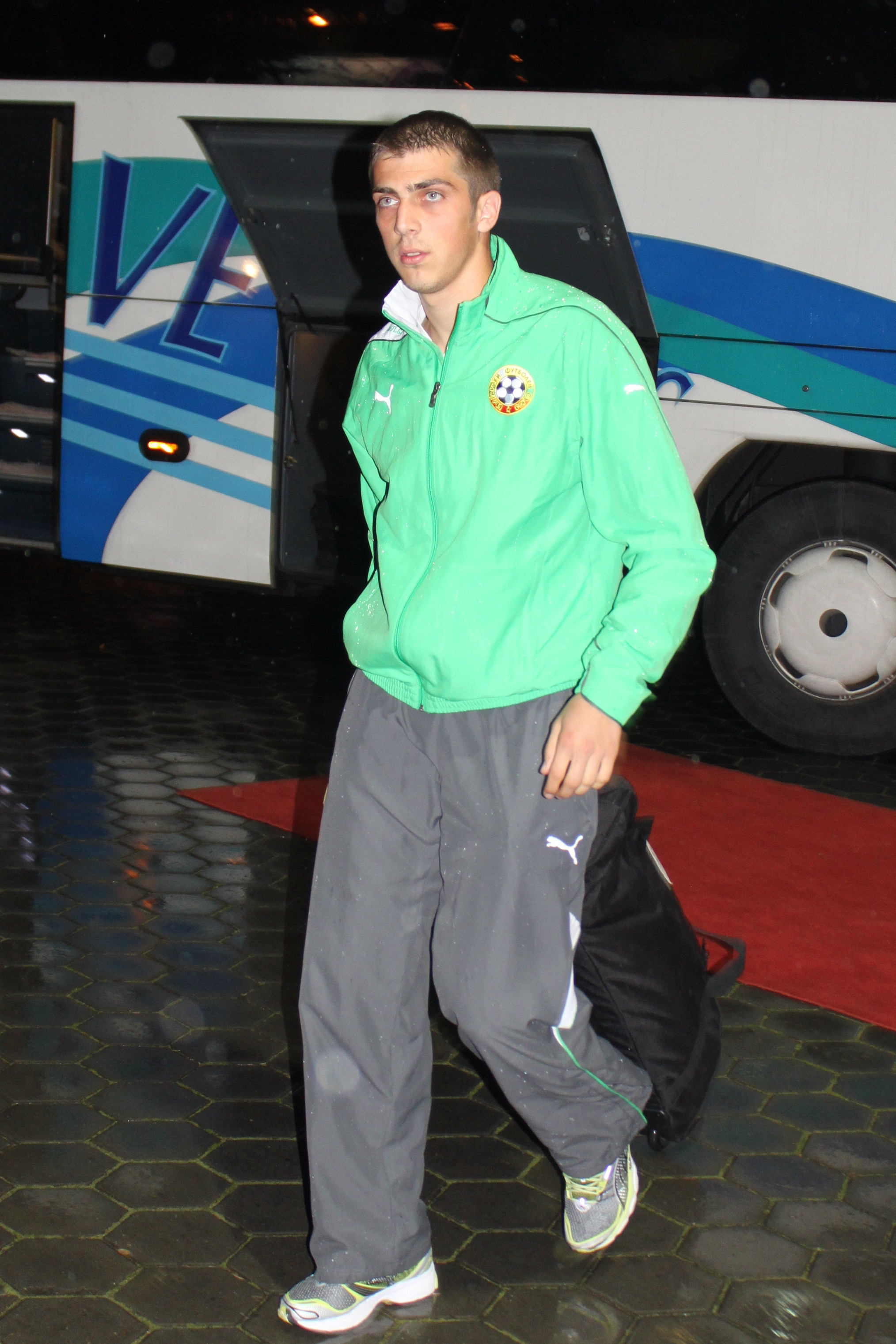
- Miliev with Bulgaria in 2010

Personal information
- Full name: Yordan Hristov Miliev
- Date of birth: 5 October 1987 (age 39)
- Place of birth: Peshtera, Bulgaria
- Height: 1.84 m (6 ft 1/2 in)
- Position: Centre-back

Youth career
- FC Apoli'99 Plovdiv

Senior career*
Years	Team	Apps	(Gls)
2006–2008	Lokomotiv Plovdiv	66	(3)
2009–2013	Levski Sofia	91	(2)
2012	→ Ironi Ramat HaSharon (loan)	10	(0)
2013–2015	Shkëndija	40	(1)
2016	Levski Sofia	2	(0)

International career^{‡}
2007	Bulgaria U21	1	(0)
2010–2016	Bulgaria	4	(0)
2018–	Bulgaria minifootball		
- * Club domestic league appearances and goals as of 20 December 2015 ‡ National team caps and goals as of 25 November 2011

Yordan Hristov Miliev (Bulgarian: Йордан Христов Милиев; born 5 October 1987) is a Bulgarian footballer who currently plays as a defender.

== Biography ==
Miliev's uncle, Ivan, was a professional footballer with the local outfit PFC Lokomotiv Plovdiv. As a youngster, Yordan supported Lokomotiv Plovdiv. Outside of football, he lists his hobbies as watching films and Formula One. Miliev is a big fan of the motoring. He also enjoys reading adventure stories.

== Career ==
=== Lokomotiv Plovdiv ===
Born in the small town of Peshtera, Miliev started his career in the private football school "Apoli'99" in Plovdiv. In June 2006, he signed his first professional contract with Lokomotiv Plovdiv. His first match for the team was against Farul Constanța in the UEFA Intertoto Cup tournament. He quickly became a key figure for Lokomotiv team, as he was considered to be highly talented and reliable in the center of the defense.

=== Levski Sofia ===
On 9 January Miliev officially signed a 2.5-year contract with Levski Sofia. He became the first signing for Levski in January. He has been given the kit number 55. He chose it, because his lucky number is 5, and he wants more than just luck, so he chose 55.

Miliev made his unofficial debut for Levski in a friendly match against Red Star Belgrade. He played 45 minutes, and Levski won the match. He eventually debut for Levski on 4 March in a match against PFC Vihren Sandanski. Levski won the match and the result was 2:0. He became a Champion of Bulgaria in 2009.

Miliev made his debut in Europe on 21 July 2009 in the second match of the 2nd Qualifying round of UEFA Champions League, where Levski beaten the team of UE Sant Julià. The result of the match was 0:5 with a guest win for Levski. He scored his first goal for Levski on 8 August 2009 against Botev Plovdiv. The result of the match was 5:0 with a home win for Levski.

In 2009/2010 season Levski achieved qualifying for UEFA Europa League becoming 3rd in the final ranking. During the 2010/2011 Levski qualified for UEFA Europa League after eliminating Dundalk F.C., Kalmar FF and AIK Fotboll. Levski was drawn in Group C, facing Gent, Lille and Sporting CP.

Prior to the start of the 2012/2013 A PFG season Miliev was loaned out to Israeli club Ironi Ramat HaSharon, but in late November 2012 he returned to Levski in part due to the tense security situation in Israel. During the 2013/2014 A PFG season, Miliev was mostly confined to substitute appearances and he joined Shkëndija from neighbouring Macedonia in January 2014.

=== International career ===
He has featured for the Bulgaria U21 national side. Miliev earned his first cap for Bulgaria on 3 March 2010 in the 0:2 away loss against Poland in a friendly match.

In 2018 Miliev was part of the Bulgarian minifootball national team in the 2018 Cape Town World Cup finishing as runner-up.

== Career stats ==
Updated 15 January 2014.

Club	Season	League		Cup		Europe		Total	
Club	Season	Apps	Goals	Apps	Goals	Apps	Goals	Apps	Goals
Levski Sofia	2008–09	4	0	2	0	0	0	6	0
Levski Sofia	2009–10	22	1	2	1	6	0	30	2
Levski Sofia	2010–11	26	1	2	0	11	0	39	1
Levski Sofia	2011–12	21	0	2	0	2	0	25	0
Levski Sofia	2012–13	6	0	1	0	0	0	7	0
Levski Sofia	2013–14	12	0	2	0	0	0	14	0
Levski totals		91	2	11	1	19	0	121	3
Shkëndija	2013–14	0	0	0	0	0	0	0	0

== Awards ==
- Champion of Bulgaria 2009
- Bulgarian Supercup 2009
