= Daniel Kiss (footballer) =

Slovak footballer (born 1984)

Personal information
- Full name: Daniel Kiss
- Date of birth: 14 April 1984 (age 42)
- Place of birth: Galanta, Czechoslovakia
- Height: 1.92 m (6 ft 4 in)
- Position: Goalkeeper

Senior career*
Years	Team	Apps	(Gls)
2003–	Slovan Bratislava	54	(0)
2008	→ Levski Sofia (loan)	3	(0)
2009–2010	→ Petržalka (loan)	7	(1)
2010–2012	→ DAC Dunajská Streda (loan)	7	(0)
2012–2013	→ Sereď (loan)		
- * Club domestic league appearances and goals as of 1 June 2012

Daniel Kiss (born 14 April 1984) is a Slovak goalkeeper.

Kiss started his career in Slovan Bratislava. On 10 August 2008 he arrived in Bulgaria to move to Levski Sofia for a fee around 100 000 euro.

== PFC Levski Sofia ==
Kiss made his official debut for Levski on 17 August 2008, in a match against Botev Plovdiv. The result of the match was 6:0.

On 7 December 2008 he was dismissed from Levski and told he was free to look around for a new team. He transferred to Artmedia Petrzalka in his home country.
