= Jean Carlos (footballer, born 1984) =

Brazilian footballer

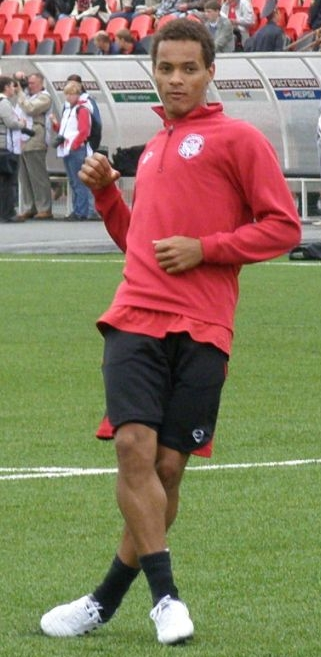

Personal information
- Full name: Jean Carlos Sales Bemvindo
- Date of birth: 17 March 1984 (age 42)
- Place of birth: Salvador, Brazil
- Height: 1.76 m (5 ft 9 in)
- Position: Striker

Team information
- Current team: Trieste

Youth career
- 2002: Bahia

Senior career*
Years	Team	Apps	(Gls)
2004	Caxias	3	(1)
2004–2005	Tubarão-SC	8	(6)
2006	Atlético Sorocaba	18	(10)
2006	Atlético Goianiense	4	(2)
2006	Chapecoense	8	(5)
2006–2007	Figueirense	6	(4)
2008–2009	Levski Sofia	15	(7)
2009–2011	Amkar Perm	25	(2)
2010	→ Shinnik Yaroslavl (loan)	9	(0)
2010–2011	→ Ceará (loan)	10	(9)
2011–2012	Chapecoense	17	(4)
2012	Joinville	15	(1)
2013	Hermann Aichinger	12	(8)
2013	Figueirense	8	(3)
2014	→ Ituano (loan)	14	(0)
2014	Figueirense	7	(2)
2015	Hermann Aichinger		
2015	Brusque		
2016	Passo Fundo		
2016	Camboriú		
2016	São Paulo RS	1	(1)
2017	Veranópolis	0	(0)
2017	Barra		
2018	CA Juventus	0	(0)
2018	Esportivo		
2018	Camboriú		
2018	Atlético Itajaí		
2019	Glória		
2019	Barra		
2021	Veranópolis		
2021–2022	Nação Esportes		
2022	→ Barra (loan)	6	(1)
2023–2025	Andraus		
2025–	Trieste FC		
- * Club domestic league appearances and goals as of 5 March 2022

Jean Carlos Sales Bemvindo (born 17 March 1984), or simply Jean Carlos, is a Brazilian professional football striker who plays for Trieste FC.

== Career ==
=== Levski Sofia ===
Jean Carlos arrived in Bulgaria on 5 December 2007. On 6 December 2007, he signed a three-year contract with Levski Sofia and became an official part of the team. The transfer fee was reportedly close to 1 million dollars. He participated in his first training with Levski on 7 December 2007. He made his unofficial debut in a friendly match against Dynamo Kyiv on 20 January 2008, playing for 63 minutes while Levski lost 2–1.

On 5 February 2008, Jean Carlos scored his first goal for Levski Sofia in the 62nd minute of a 1–0 win against České Budějovice. His next goal came in the following match against Rapid București, where he scored in the 37th minute of a 3–2 win.

He made his official debut for Levski on 24 February 2008 in a match against Chernomorets Burgas. In the same match he scored his first goal for Levski in A PFG. Levski won the match 2–1, after a second goal from Daniel Borimirov.

Jean Carlos made his debut in Europe on 13 August 2008 in a match against BATE Borisov. He entered the game as a substitute, but was unable to help the team secure a draw.

He was sold to Amkar Perm on 6 February 2009.

=== Amkar Perm ===
On 6 February 2009, it was announced that Jean Carlos would move to Amkar Perm. He made his debut on 14 February 2009 in a match against Shinnik Yaroslavl. The match was a draw and Jean played until the 70th minute. On 16 May 2009, Jean Carlos scored his first goal for the team from Perm in a 2–2 home draw with Rubin Kazan. On 14 February 2010, he was loaned to Shinnik Yaroslavl.

== Honours ==
Ituano

- Campeonato Paulista: 2014
