= Rachid Tiberkanine =

Moroccan footballer

- Tiberkanine in 2016

Personal information
- Date of birth: 28 March 1985 (age 41)
- Place of birth: Antwerp, Belgium
- Height: 1.72 m (5 ft 8 in)
- Positions: Midfielder; forward

Youth career
- Liège
- Germinal Beerschot

Senior career*
Years	Team	Apps	(Gls)
2004–2006	Ajax	0	(0)
2006–2007	Bayer Leverkusen II	25	(3)
2007–2008	FC Moscow		
2008	→ FC Daugava (loan)	19	(3)
2008–2010	Levski Sofia	14	(3)
2010–2011	Dubai Club	16	(11)
2015–2016	Olympique de Khouribga	55	(5)
2016–2018	FUS	9	(0)
2017–2018	→ Al Kharaitiyat (loan)	29	(19)
2018–2019	Al-Sailiya	18	(13)
2019–2023	Al Kharaitiyat	63	(34)

International career^{‡}
2015	Morocco	2	(0)
- * Club domestic league appearances and goals as of 08:53, 15 April 2023 (UTC) ‡ National team caps and goals as of 18:40, 30 June 2016 (UTC)

Rachid Tiberkanine (born 28 March 1985) is a professional footballer who plays as a midfielder and forward. Born in Belgium, he represented Morocco at international level.

== Early and personal life ==
Born in Antwerp, Belgium, Tiberkanine holds dual Belgian and Moroccan nationality.

== Club career ==
Tiberkanine spent his early career with Liège and Germinal Beerschot. He signed a professional contract with Dutch club Ajax in 2004, but never made a first-team appearance. He moved to German club Bayer Leverkusen in June 2006. After playing for their second team, he moved to Russian club FC Moscow, who in turn loaned him to Latvian club FC Daugava. He next moved to Bulgarian club Levski Sofia, and later played for Emirati club Dubai Club and Moroccan club Olympique de Khouribga. He signed for FUS in July 2016. He joined Qatari club Al Kharaitiyat on loan in 2017. He joined Qatari club Al-Sailiya in 2018. He joined Qatari club Al Kharaitiyat in 2019.

== International career ==
After playing youth football for Belgium, he later declared his international allegiance to Morocco.
