= Emil Velev =

Bulgarian footballer and manager

Emil Velev Емил Симеонов Велев
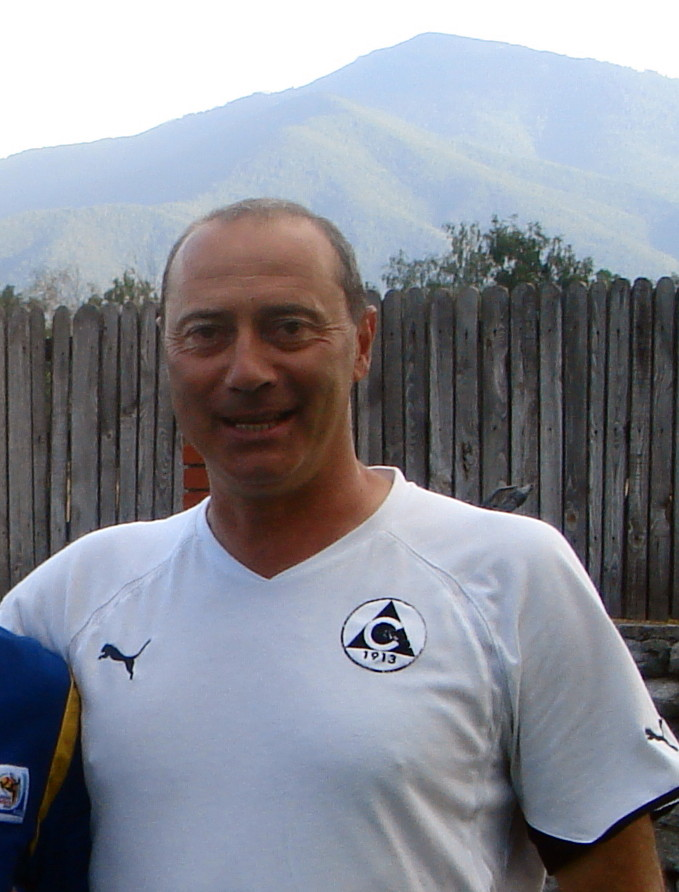
- Velev in 2010

Personal information
- Full name: Emil Simeonov Velev
- Date of birth: 5 February 1962 (age 64)
- Place of birth: Sofia, Bulgaria
- Position: Defensive midfielder

Senior career*
Years	Team	Apps	(Gls)
1981–1989	Levski Sofia	150	(19)
1989–1990	Hapoel Ramat Gan		
1990–1994	Maccabi Ironi Ashdod		
1994–1995	Maccabi Jaffa		
1995–1996	Levski Sofia	26	(3)
1996	Maccabi Ironi Ashdod		
1996–1997	Hapoel Bat Yam		
1997–1999	Beitar Avraham Be'er Sheva		
1999–2000	Maccabi Ashkelon		
2000–2001	Maccabi Ramat Amidar		

Managerial career
- 2002–2008: Levski Sofia (assistant)
- 2008–2009: Levski Sofia
- 2010–2011: Slavia Sofia
- 2011–2012: Lokomotiv Plovdiv
- 2012–2013: Lokomotiv Sofia
- 2014: Lokomotiv Plovdiv
- 2014–2015: Haskovo
- 2015–2016: Montana
- 2016–2017: Oborishte
- 2017–2018: Spartak Pleven
- 2018–2019: Dobrudzha Dobrich
- 2021: Levski Lom
- 2021–2022: Vihren Sandanski
- * Club domestic league appearances and goals

Emil Velev (Bulgarian: Емил Симеонов Велев; born 5 February 1962) is a Bulgarian former footballer and currently manager.

== Career ==
Velev started his career in Levski Sofia. Kokala James (Bulgarian: Кокала) (The bone James), as the fans called him, played for Levski's first team from 1981 until 1989. He became Champion of Bulgaria in 1984, 1985 and 1988. Velev won the Cup of Bulgaria in 1982 and 1984. He registered 176 matches and 22 scores for Levski in the championship, and 34 matches and 8 goals for the Cup of Bulgaria. Velev had also played for many years with Maccabi Ironi Ashdod F.C. in Israel.

== Coaching career ==
=== Levski Sofia ===
In 2002 Velev became an assistant coach of PFC Levski Sofia. Six years later, Emil became head coach of Levski, after Velislav Vutsov's sacking. Under his guidance, Levski secured a 1–1 away draw against Belarusian FC BATE Borisov in the third qualifying phase of the UEFA Champions League, but this result was insufficient for Levski to progress after the 0–1 home loss in the first game.

Velev made an awesome debut in the Bulgarian league, coaching Levski. He debuted as a coach on 17 August 2008 in a game against Botev Plovdiv. Levski won the match 6–0. However, Velev drew the ire of Levski supporters on a number of occasions in subsequent matches due to what were perceived to be poor tactics and inconsistent player selections. After Levski were eliminated by Slovak MŠK Žilina, Velev criticized some of the Levski ultras, hinting at their latent alcoholism and drug abuse, and condemned what he regarded as their insufficient support during matches. Velev eventually stated that some of his comments had been misconstrued by the media and attempted to mend fences with the Levski supporters, praising them for their passion for the team on a number of occasions.

He led the blues to become the Champion of Bulgaria on 31 May 2009 following a 1–1 home draw against Minyor Pernik. All in all, this was attained after a contradictory but great season under his coaching. Despite the bad results during the autumn part of the season, after great matches in the spring, Levski Sofia fulfilled the initial plan and became a champion for the 26th time, with the last round still to be played. On 23 July 2009, Velev announced that he had been fired from Levski Sofia, despite the fact that Levski won 9–0 on aggregate against Andorran side UE Sant Julià in the second qualifying round of the 2009–10 UEFA Champions League.

=== Slavia Sofia ===
In May 2010 it was announced that Velev is the new manager of Slavia Sofia.

With Slavia he managed to lead the team to the Final of the Cup. Slavia lost it against CSKA with 1–0. This was the first time since 15 years the "Whites" played a final. The last time when Slavia achieved that was in 1996. However, despite the good run in the Bulgarian Cup Slavia recorded a very poor performances in the championship. In 11th spot with 15 lost games Velev was relieved of his duties.

=== Lokomotiv Plovdiv ===
On 8 November 2011, Velev was announced as the new head coach of Lokomotiv Plovdiv replacing Dragan Kanatlarovski after series of bad results. Velev's contract will be until the end of the season. Velev managed to lead the team to a positive series of results. He started with a few wins and led the team to the Final of the Cup eliminating Levski Sofia at Lauta (2–1 after extra time) and Litex Lovech in Lovech (1–0) in the semifinals making it to the final against Ludogorets. However Lokomotiv lost the final against Ludogorets but made it to Europa League for the first time since 2005. The Plovdiv side played against Vitesse in the Second Round of the tournament and were eliminated after a 4-4 draw followed by a 1-3 loss in the Netherlands. In October 2012 Velev was sacked by the new Loko Plovdiv Board.

=== Lokomotiv Sofia ===
In the late 2012 Velev was appointed as new coach of Lokomotiv Sofia. He managed to avoid relegation and led the team to the semi-finals of the Bulgarian Cup after eliminating CSKA Sofia 1–0 on aggregate.

On 5 August 2013, Velev was sacked and replaced by Stefan Genov at Lokomotiv Sofia.

=== Lokomotiv Plovdiv ===
In June 2014, Velev returned as manager of Lokomotiv Plovdiv, but parted ways with the team in early July 2014.

=== Haskovo ===
Velev was in charge of Haskovo between October 2014 and March 2015, but resigned after he was unable to pull the team out of the relegation zone.

=== Montana ===
Velev took over as manager of Montana in November 2015, on a contract until the end of the season. He left by mutual consent in May 2016.

=== Oborishte ===
Velev was appointed as manager of Oborishte Panagyurishte on 17 October 2016 with the sole purpose to avoid relegation to Third League. He managed to complete the task and stepped down on 1 June 2017, when his contract expired.

=== Manager statistics ===
Team	Nat	Year	Record				
Team	Nat	Year	G	W	D	L	Win %
Levski Sofia	(Bulgaria)	August 2008 - 22 July 2009	38	26	7	5	68.42

As of 21 July 2009, includes all official matches - Bulgarian League, Bulgarian Cup (+ overtime) and international tournament games.

== Awards ==
=== As a player ===
- Champion of Bulgaria 1984, 1985, 1988
- Bulgarian Cup 1982, 1984

=== As a manager ===
- Champion of Bulgaria 2009
