= List of Bulgarian football transfers winter 2010–11 =

This is a list of Bulgarian football transfers in the winter transfer window 2010–11 by club. Only transfers of the A PFG clubs are listed.

== Akademik ==
In:

No.	Pos.	Nation	Player
11	MF	FRA	Ender Günlü (from (Azerbaijan) AZAL Baku)
17	DF	BUL	Kristian Uzunov (from Chernomorets Pomorie)
22	MF	POR	Sérgio Organista (on loan from CSKA Sofia)
23	FW	ALB	Enco Malindi (from (Albania) KF Tirana)
25	MF	SRB	Nikola Radulović (on loan from CSKA Sofia)
26	FW	CHI	Nicolás Medina (from (Spain) Osasuna)
33	GK	BUL	Bozhidar Stoychev (on loan from CSKA Sofia)

Out:

No.	Pos.	Nation	Player
5	DF	BUL	Martin Sechkov (to Slavia Sofia)
7	MF	BUL	Mihail Aleksandrov (to Ludogorets Razgrad)
11	MF	BUL	Samir Aess (to Minyor Pernik)
24	MF	TUR	Güven Güneri (to (Turkey) İnegölspor)
33	GK	BUL	Emil Mihaylov (to Ludogorets Razgrad)

== Beroe ==
In:

No.	Pos.	Nation	Player
1	GK	BUL	Martin Temenliev (from Chernomorets Balchik)
5	DF	CRO	Vanja Džaferović (from (Cyprus) Ethnikos Achna)
6	MF	BUL	Simeon Mechev (on loan from Slavia Sofia)
8	MF	BUL	Tsvetan Filipov (from Chernomorets Pomorie)
22	GK	BUL	Miroslav Radev (from Kaliakra Kavarna)
27	MF	BUL	Vladislav Yamukov (from Sliven 2000)
32	FW	BRA	Romario (from (Brazil) Radium Mococa)
71	MF	BUL	Milen Tanev (from Chernomorets Balchik)

Out:

No.	Pos.	Nation	Player
4	DF	BUL	Todor Dinchev (on loan to Lyubimetz 2007)
5	DF	BUL	Georgi Hashev (on loan to Sliven 2000)
6	MF	BUL	Simeon Minchev (released)
15	FW	BUL	Ivan Yanchev (on loan to Nesebar)
22	GK	BUL	Karamfil Ilchev (retired)
27	FW	BUL	Atanas Apostolov (on loan to Lyubimetz 2007)

== Cherno More ==
In:

No.	Pos.	Nation	Player
5	MF	BRA	Samuel Camazzola (from (Brazil) Esportivo)
55	DF	BUL	Rosen Kolev (from Kom-Minyor)
77	FW	BUL	Vladimir Kaptiev (from Dunav Ruse)

Out:

No.	Pos.	Nation	Player
5	DF	BUL	Nikolay Domakinov (to Montana)
10	MF	BUL	Daniel Dimov (to Levski Sofia)
16	FW	BRA	Mário Jardel (to (Brazil) Rio Negro)
22	MF	BUL	Milen Petkov (to Dobrudzha Dobrich)
28	MF	BRA	Eli Marques (to (Cyprus) AEL Limassol)
34	DF	BUL	Kamen Trifonov (on loan to Dobrudzha Dobrich)
77	MF	BUL	Yordan Yurukov (to Slavia Sofia)

== Chernomorets ==
In:

No.	Pos.	Nation	Player
7	FW	GER	Savio Nsereko (on loan from (Italy) Fiorentina)
8	MF	ITA	Alberto Quadri (from (Italy) Lazio)
15	DF	BUL	Venelin Filipov (from Chernomorets Pomorie)
18	FW	BUL	Yani Pehlivanov (from Chernomorets Pomorie)
20	MF	ITA	Michele Cruciani (from (Italy) Gela Calcio)
23	DF	ISL	Josef Josefsson (from (Iceland) Grindavík)
28	FW	BUL	Branimir Kostadinov (from Chernomorets Pomorie)
83	MF	POR	Jaime Bragança (from (Kuwait) Al Sahel)
—	DF	BUL	Kostadin Velkov (from Chernomorets Pomorie)

Out:

No.	Pos.	Nation	Player
5	DF	BUL	Nikolay Krastev (to Chernomorets Pomorie)
7	FW	GER	Matthias Morys (to (Germany) VfR Aalen)
8	MF	POR	Márcio Abreu (to (Russia) Krasnodar)
9	FW	ARG	Adrián Fernández (released)
29	GK	SRB	Lazar Jovisić (on loan to Chernomorets Pomorie)
30	MF	BRA	António dos Santos (released)
78	MF	POR	Pedrinha (released)

== CSKA Sofia ==
In:

No.	Pos.	Nation	Player
14	FW	BUL	Stanislav Kostov (from Pirin Blagoevgrad)
17	MF	BUL	Chetin Sadula (from Kaliakra Kavarna)
20	MF	BUL	Petar Stoyanov (from Sliven 2000)
23	MF	BUL	Emil Gargorov (from (Romania) Universitatea Craiova)
27	FW	BUL	Stanko Yovchev (from (Greece) Pontioi Katerini)
88	GK	BUL	Blagoy Makendzhiev (from Pirin Blagoevgrad)
--	MF	POR	Sérgio Organista (from (Greece) OFI)

Out:

No.	Pos.	Nation	Player
9	FW	BUL	Dormushali Saidhodzha (to Lokomotiv Sofia)
13	GK	BUL	Bozhidar Stoychev (on loan to Akademik Sofia)
14	FW	BUL	Dimitar Iliev (on loan to Pirin Blagoevgrad)
16	FW	ITA	Christian Tiboni (loan return to (Italy) Atalanta)
22	DF	ITA	Marco Esposito (to (Italy) Portogruaro)
23	MF	GHA	William Tiero (to (Portugal) Olhanense)
25	DF	BUL	Yordan Minev (to Botev Plovdiv)
27	DF	BUL	Martin Dechev (on loan to Ludogorets Razgrad)
92	GK	ALG	Raïs M'Bolhi (loan return to Slavia Sofia)
--	MF	POR	Sérgio Organista (on loan to Akademik Sofia)

== Kaliakra ==
In:

No.	Pos.	Nation	Player
6	MF	GHA	Michael Tawiah (on loan from Levski Sofia)
7	MF	BUL	Lachezar Baltanov (on loan from Levski Sofia)
12	GK	BUL	Tzvetan Dimitrov (from Levski Sofia)
16	FW	BUL	Daniel Shmedin (on loan from Levski Sofia)
18	FW	BUL	Desislav Rusev (from Chernomorets Balchik)

Out:

No.	Pos.	Nation	Player
6	FW	BUL	Dimitar Chechev (to Malesh Mikrevo)
7	DF	BUL	Ivan Zdravkov (loan return to Slavia Sofia)
16	MF	BUL	Stoyan Stefanov (to Sliven 2000)
18	MF	BUL	Delcho Stoilov (released)
22	MF	BUL	Chetin Sadula (to CSKA Sofia)
27	FW	BUL	Alexandar Mladenov (to (Ukraine) Sevastopol)
33	GK	BUL	Miroslav Radev (to Beroe)
77	MF	BUL	Svetoslav Petrov (retired)

== Levski Sofia ==
In:

No.	Pos.	Nation	Player
6	FW	BEL	Jeanvion Yulu-Matondo (from (Netherlands) Roda JC)
8	MF	BUL	Daniel Dimov (from Cherno More)
11	DF	MNE	Marko Vidovic (from (Cyprus) Anorthosis Famagusta)
23	GK	BUL	Plamen Iliev (from Vidima-Rakovski)

Out:

No.	Pos.	Nation	Player
1	GK	BUL	Georgi Petkov (to (Cyprus) Enosis Paralimni)
6	MF	GHA	Michael Tawiah (on loan to Kaliakra Kavarna)
13	FW	BUL	Daniel Shmedin (on loan to Kaliakra Kavarna)
15	DF	MAR	Chakib Benzoukane (released)
20	MF	BRA	Joãozinho (to (Russia) Krasnodar)
23	MF	NED	Andwélé Slory (to (Australia) Adelaide United)
26	DF	BUL	Kalin Shtarkov (on loan to Vidima-Rakovski)
30	MF	BUL	Lachezar Baltanov (on loan to Kaliakra Kavarna)
31	GK	BUL	Tzvetan Dimitrov (to Kaliakra Kavarna)

== Litex ==
In:

No.	Pos.	Nation	Player
11	FW	SEN	Pape Diouf (on loan from (Senegal) Dakar UC)
14	FW	SVN	Dejan Djermanović (from (Slovenia) Rudar Velenje)
20	MF	BRA	Neném (from (Brazil) Rio Branco)

Out:

No.	Pos.	Nation	Player
11	FW	ROU	Florin Bratu (loan return to (Romania) Dinamo București)
19	FW	FRA	Wilfried Niflore (to (France) Nîmes Olympique)

== Lokomotiv Plovdiv ==
In:

No.	Pos.	Nation	Player
7	MF	BUL	Yordan Todorov (from Minyor Pernik)
10	MF	POR	Serginho (from (Greece) Levadiakos)
14	MF	SRB	Nenad Lukić (from (Serbia) Teleoptik)
17	DF	SRB	Bojan Dojkić (from (Greece) Trikala)
22	FW	FRA	Dimitri Durand (from (France) Red Star)
25	MF	ARG	Juan Barrientos (from (Greece) Trikala)
44	MF	BUL	Lyubomir Vitanov (from Minyor Pernik)
88	FW	NGA	Patrick Ogunsoto (from (Greece) Ergotelis)

Out:

No.	Pos.	Nation	Player
7	DF	BUL	Tsvetan Yotov (to Spartak Plovdiv)
11	MF	BUL	Ivaylo Gerdzhikov (released)
14	DF	BUL	Kostadin Gadzhalov (to Botev Plovdiv)
15	MF	BUL	Nikolay Chipev (to (Malta) Ħamrun Spartans)
17	MF	BUL	Martin Kerchev (to (Azerbaijan) Turan Tovuz)
18	FW	CIV	Bassilia Sakanoko (loan return to (Belgium) WS Woluwe)
20	MF	BRA	Tom (to Minyor Pernik)
22	MF	BUL	Krasen Trifonov (to Nesebar)
25	DF	BUL	Emil Argirov (to Botev Plovdiv)
26	DF	BUL	Angel Yoshev (to Minyor Pernik)
66	DF	BUL	Kiril Kotev (to (China) Dalian Aerbin)
88	FW	BUL	Georgi Petrov (to Sliven 2000)

== Lokomotiv Sofia ==
In:

No.	Pos.	Nation	Player
7	FW	USA	Jemal Johnson (from (England) MK Dons)
19	DF	BUL	Yordan Varbanov (from (China) Anhui Jiufang)
77	MF	MAR	Youssef Idrissi (from (France) Andrézieux)
99	FW	BUL	Dormushali Saidhodzha (from CSKA Sofia)

Out:

No.	Pos.	Nation	Player
1	FW	GHA	Derek Asamoah (to (South Korea) Pohang Steelers)
7	MF	BUL	Dimo Atanasov (to Ludogorets Razgrad)
9	FW	BUL	Tsvetan Genkov (loan return to (Russia) Dynamo Moscow)

== Minyor ==
In:

No.	Pos.	Nation	Player
5	DF	BUL	Borislav Stoychev (from Lyubimetz 2007)
7	MF	BUL	Milen Vasilev (from Sliven 2000)
8	MF	BUL	Samir Aess (from Akademik Sofia)
12	FW	BUL	Kostadin Adzhov (from Vidima-Rakovski Sevlievo)
26	DF	BUL	Angel Yoshev (from Lokomotiv Plovdiv)
28	FW	BUL	Yavor Vandev (from Brestnik 1948)
33	MF	BRA	Tom (from Lokomotiv Plovdiv)
42	MF	ALG	Farès Brahimi (from (France) Saint-Étienne B)
88	FW	CZE	Tomáš Okleštěk (from (Czech Republic) Zbrojovka Brno)

Out:

No.	Pos.	Nation	Player
7	MF	BUL	Mladen Stoev (to Sportist Svoge)
8	MF	BUL	Yordan Todorov (to Lokomotiv Plovdiv)
21	FW	BUL	Kostadin Hazurov (to (Israel) Bnei Sakhnin)
22	DF	BUL	Yuri Ivanov (to Vihren Sandanski)
23	MF	BUL	Hristo Gospodinov (to Vidima-Rakovski)
24	MF	BUL	Lyubomir Vitanov (to Lokomotiv Plovdiv)
28	MF	SRB	Velimir Ivanović (to Dorostol Silistra)
99	GK	BUL	Ivaylo Ivanov (released)

== Montana ==
In:

No.	Pos.	Nation	Player
4	DF	SEN	Moussa Gueye (from (Lebanon) Nejmeh SC)
13	DF	BUL	Nikolay Domakinov (from Cherno More)
20	MF	BRA	Anderson (from (Brazil) São Bento)
24	FW	BUL	Boyan Gaytano] (from Lokomotiv Mezdra)
25	DF	BUL	Nikolay Nikolov (from (Armenia) Banants)

Out:

No.	Pos.	Nation	Player
4	DF	BUL	Stanislav Zhekov (to Ludogorets Razgrad)
12	GK	BUL	Viktor Georgiev (to Nesebar)
13	DF	BUL	Dimitar Nakov (to Pirin Blagoevgrad)
17	DF	BUL	Murad Ibrahim (to Lyubimetz 2007)
20	MF	BUL	Miroslav Ivanov (to Ludogorets Razgrad)

== Pirin ==
In:

No.	Pos.	Nation	Player
1	GK	BUL	Atanas Arshinkov (from Bansko)
5	DF	BUL	Dimitar Koemdzhiev (from Vihren Sandanski)
11	MF	BUL	Ventsislav Bengyuzov (on loan from Litex Lovech)
15	FW	BUL	Krum Bibishkov (from (Israel) Hapoel Ramat Gan)
18	MF	BUL	Atanas Zehirov (from CSKA Sofia)
24	FW	BUL	Ivan Tsvetkov (from (Azerbaijan) Khazar Lankaran)
25	DF	BUL	Dimitar Nakov (from Montana)
28	FW	BUL	Georgi Kakalov (from Botev Plovdiv)
29	FW	BUL	Dimitar Iliev (on loan from CSKA Sofia)

Out:

No.	Pos.	Nation	Player
6	DF	BUL	Georgi Georgiev (to Ludogorets Razgrad)
7	FW	MKD	Zoran Zlatkovski (to Ludogorets Razgrad)
9	FW	BUL	Stanislav Kostov (to CSKA Sofia)
12	GK	BUL	Blagoy Makendzhiev (to CSKA Sofia)
23	DF	BUL	Dian Moldovanov (to Slavia Sofia)
29	FW	BUL	Boris Kondev (to (Azerbaijan) Turan Tovuz)

== Slavia ==
In:

No.	Pos.	Nation	Player
4	DF	BRA	Josias Basso (from (Romania) Universitatea Cluj)
6	DF	BUL	Martin Sechkov (from Akademik Sofia)
8	MF	SRB	Pavle Popara (loan return from (Romania) Astra Ploieşti)
10	MF	BUL	Yordan Yurukov (from Cherno More)
18	DF	BUL	Filip Filipov (from Sliven 2000)
19	FW	BUL	Martin Kushev (from (Russia) Amkar Perm)
33	MF	BRA	Baiano (from (Romania) Politehnica Iaşi)
34	FW	BUL	Ivan Kokonov (from Sliven 2000)
35	DF	BUL	Dian Moldovanov (from Pirin Blagoevgrad)
44	FW	BRA	Jose Junior (loan return from (Armenia) Banants)

Out:

No.	Pos.	Nation	Player
2	DF	BUL	Atanas Drenovichki (on loan to Ludogorets Razgrad)
6	MF	BUL	Nikolay Dyulgerov (to Ludogorets Razgrad)
8	FW	BUL	Antonio Pavlov (to Ludogorets Razgrad)
10	FW	BUL	Todor Kolev (to Ludogorets Razgrad)
13	MF	BUL	Stefan Kikov (released)
14	DF	BUL	Emil Martinov (on loan to Dorostol Silistra)
15	DF	BUL	Galin Bogdanov (on loan to Dorostol Silistra)
18	MF	BUL	Radoslav Rangelov (released)
27	DF	FRA	Steeve Joseph-Reinette (to (Russia) Krylia Sovetov, previously on loan at (Russia) Sibir)
29	GK	ALG	Raïs M'Bolhi (to (Russia) Krylia Sovetov, previously on loan at CSKA Sofia)
33	MF	BUL	Galin Ivanov (on loan to (Germany) Arminia Bielefeld)
34	FW	BUL	Ivan Kokonov (on loan to Botev Vratsa)
35	DF	BUL	Yordan Petkov (to (Cyprus) Ermis Aradippou)
44	DF	BUL	Simeon Mechev (on loan to Beroe)

== Sliven 2000 ==
In:

No.	Pos.	Nation	Player
3	MF	BUL	Hristian Popov (from Svilengrad 1921)
6	DF	BUL	Milcho Makendzhiev (from Nesebar)
9	FW	BUL	Georgi Karaneychev (from Ludogorets Razgrad)
11	MF	BUL	Veselin Marchev (from Lokomotiv Plovdiv)
15	MF	BUL	Stayko Stoychev (from Kom-Minyor)
16	MF	BUL	Stoyan Stefanov (from Kaliakra Kavarna)
17	MF	BUL	Dilyan Kolev (from Kom-Minyor)
18	DF	BUL	Stoyan Georgiev (from Dunav Ruse)
19	DF	BUL	Andrey Stoev (from Pirin Blagoevgrad)
20	DF	BUL	Martin Tsirkov (from Dunav Ruse)
22	FW	BUL	Georgi Petrov (from Lokomotiv Plovdiv)
23	MF	SRB	Marko Ilić (from Topolite)
24	MF	BUL	Ivaylo Petrov (loan return from Svetkavitsa)
26	MF	BUL	Georgi Nedyalkov (from Kom-Minyor)
27	DF	BUL	Georgi Hashev (on loan from Beroe)

Out:

No.	Pos.	Nation	Player
4	MF	BUL	Milen Vasilev (to Minyor Pernik)
6	DF	BUL	Nikolay Dimitrov (to Botev Plovdiv)
7	FW	BUL	Miroslav Mindev (to Etar Veliko Tarnovo)
11	MF	BRA	David Lazari (to (Belarus) Dinamo Brest)
14	FW	BUL	Deyan Hristov (to (Kazakhstan) Kairat Almaty)
15	MF	BRA	Adriano Miranda (to (Brazil) Tuna Luso)
16	DF	BUL	Martin Kovachev (released)
19	FW	BUL	Evgeni Ignatov (to Vidima-Rakovski)
22	MF	BUL	Petar Stoyanov (to CSKA Sofia)
24	DF	BUL	Filip Filipov (to Slavia Sofia)
27	DF	BUL	Vladislav Yamukov (to Beroe)

== Vidima-Rakovski ==
In:

No.	Pos.	Nation	Player
10	MF	BUL	Hristo Gospodinov (from Minyor Pernik)
14	DF	BUL	Ivan Skerlev (from Brestnik 1948)
17	DF	BUL	Kalin Shtarkov (on loan from Levski Sofia)
18	FW	BUL	Lyubomir Velichkov (from Sportist Svoge)
19	FW	BUL	Evgeni Ignatov (from Sliven 2000)
20	FW	BUL	Atanas Ivanov (from Pirin Gotse Delchev)
22	GK	BUL	Plamen Kolev (from Chernomorets Pomorie)
62	GK	BUL	Ivaylo Vasilev (on loan from Levski Sofia)

Out:

No.	Pos.	Nation	Player
8	MF	BUL	Vladimir Pekin (released)
12	FW	BUL	Kostadin Adzhov (to Minyor Pernik)
13	MF	BUL	Dobri Dobrev (released)
14	DF	BUL	Zdravko Stankov (released)
17	FW	BUL	Anatoli Todorov (to Brestnik 1948)
18	MF	BUL	Atanas Vargov (released)
19	FW	BUL	Emil Stoev (to Dimitrovgrad)
22	GK	BUL	Plamen Iliev (to Levski Sofia)
24	DF	BUL	Atanas Pashkulev (to Brestnik 1948)
