= 2010–11 Bulgarian Cup =

Tournament details
- Country: Bulgaria

Final positions
- Champions: CSKA Sofia (19th cup)
- Runners-up: Slavia Sofia

The 2010–11 Bulgarian Cup was the 29th official season of the Bulgarian annual football knockout tournament. The competition began in September 2010 with the matches of the preliminary round and ended the final in May 2011. Beroe Stara Zagora are the defending champions.

The winners of the competition will qualify for the play-off round of the 2011–12 UEFA Europa League.

== Participating clubs ==
The following teams will compete in the cup: (Teams in bold are still active in the competition)

**2010–11 A Group** all clubs	**2010–11 B Group West** all clubs	**2010–11 B Group East** all clubs	**Winners of 8 regional competitions**
Litex Lovech; **CSKA Sofia**; Levski Sofia; Lokomotiv Sofia; Chernomorets Burgas; **Slavia Sofia**; Cherno More Varna; Minyor Pernik; Pirin Blagoevgrad; Beroe Stara Zagora; Montana; Lokomotiv Plovdiv; Sliven; Kaliakra; Vidima-Rakovski Sevlievo; Akademik Sofia	Sportist; Bansko; Vihren; Etar Veliko Tarnovo; Botev Vratsa; Septemvri Simitli; Chavdar Etropole; Pirin Gotse Delchev; Kom-Minyor; Botev Krivodol; Chavdar Byala Slatina; Malesh Mikrevo	Nesebar; Dunav Ruse; Spartak Plovdiv; Lyubimetz; Brestnik; Chernomorets Pomorie; Chernomorets Balchik; Svetkavitsa; Dobrudzha; Ludogorets Razgrad; Dorostol Silistra; Ravda	from North-East zone: Belitsa; Topolite; from North-West zone: Samovodene; Yantra Gabrovo; from South-East zone: Sozopol; Dimitrovgrad; from South-West zone: Strela Dobroslavtsi; Pirin Razlog

== Calendar for remaining rounds ==
The calendar for the remaining rounds of the 2010–11 Bulgarian Cup, as announced by the BFL.

- Round 1: 27 October 2010
- Round 2: 20 November 2010
- Round 3: 4 December 2010
- Quarter-finals: 5–7 April 2011
- Semi-finals: 20–21 April 2011
- Final: 25 May 2011

== First round ==
The draw was conducted on 18 October 2010. The matches will be played on 27 October 2010. On this stage the participants will be the 24 teams from the two second divisions and the 8 winners from the regional amateur competitions. The team from the lower league has home advantage.

Note: Roman numerals in brackets denote the league tier the clubs participate in during the 2010–11 season.

26 October 2010	Botev Krivodol (II)	3–1	Lyubimetz (II)	Mezdra
14:00 EEST	Baev 15'; Chirpanov 66', 77'	Report	Kehayov 56'	Stadium: Lokomotiv; Referee: Velislav Yordanov

26 October 2010	Malesh Mikrevo (II)	3–0	Ravda (II)
Note: Ravda canceled their participation from the competition

27 October 2010	Chernomorets Pomorie (II)	0–0 (a.e.t.) (3–2 p)	Nesebar (II)	Pomorie
14:00 EEST		Report		Stadium: Pomorie; Referee: Valeri Vulkov

27 October 2010	Sozopol (III)	2–1	Spartak Plovdiv (II)	Tsarevo
14:00 EEST	Ralev 52'; Mustafa 72'	Report	Stoyanov 90+3' (pen.)	Stadium: Gradski

27 October 2010	Vihren (II)	5–0	Sportist Svoge (II)	Sandanski
14:00 EEST	K. Nikolov 14'; Panchev 24'; Gushterov 38'; Stankev 83'; Zahariev 86'	Report		Stadium: Sandanski; Referee: Danail Zahariev

27 October 2010	Pirin Gotse Delchev (II)	1–3	Dobrudzha (II)	Gotse Delchev
14:00 EEST	Shishkov 5'; Sherif (red card) 15'	Report	N. Kolev 26'; Kostov 31'; Angelov 86'	Stadium: Gradski; Referee: Stanislav Gruev

27 October 2010	Chernomrets Balchik (II)	1–0	Septemvri Simitli (II)	Albena
14:00 EEST	Kurtev 71'	Report		Stadium: Albena; Referee: Maksim Lazarov

27 October 2010	Bansko (II)	3–1	Svetkavitsa (II)	Bansko
14:00 EEST	G. Nikolov 75'; Mihaylov 86'; Kyosev 90+3'	Report	N. Nikolov 43'	Stadium: Saint Peter; Referee: Dimitar Petkov

27 October 2010	Bretsnik (II)	1–3	Dorostol (II)	Brestnik
14:00 EEST	Marchev 8'	Report	Beadirov 5' (pen.); Mehmed 29'; T.Dimitrov 44'	Stadium: Berkut; Referee: Pavlin Tyutyundzhiyan

27 October 2010	Dimitrovgrad (III)	0–2	Ludogorets Razgrad (II)	Dimitrovgrad
14:00 EEST		Report	Salif 40'; Kaptiev 52'	Stadium: Minyor; Referee: Valentin Dikov

27 October 2010	Belitsa (III)	0–6	Botev Vratsa (II)	Silistra
14:00 EEST		Report	Danchev 9', 39', 61'; Manolov 15'; Raykov 37'; Cheneshkov 83'	Stadium: Louis Ayer; Referee: Angel Angelov

27 October 2010	Yantra Gabrovo (III)	1–2	Etar Veliko Tarnovo (II)	Gabrovo
14:00 EEST	Kyosev 50'	Report	Kyamil 47'; Kushev 76'	Stadium: Hristo Botev; Referee: Rangel Enchev

27 October 2010	Pirin Razlog (III)	1–2	Kom-Minyor (II)	Razlog
14:00 EEST	Pandev 43' (pen.)	Report	Jonathan 75'; Todorov 90'	Stadium: Gradski

27 October 2010	Strela Dobroslavtsi (IV)	0–2	Chavdar Byala Slatina (II)	Sofia
14:00 EEST		Report	Zh. Atanasov 67'; Kamenov 80'	Stadium: Obelya; Attendance: 150; Referee: Hristo Hristov

27 October 2010	Chavdar Etropole (II)	4–0	Dunav Ruse (II)	Etropole
14:00 EEST	Chochev 42'; Pirgov 46'; Valchanov 52'; Kraev 77'	Report		Stadium: Chavdar; Attendance: 300; Referee: Martin Stoimenov

28 October 2010	Samovodene (III)	2–3	Topolite (III)	Veliko Tarnovo
14:00 EEST	Momchilov 38'; Karaivanov 88'	Report	Radomirov 8'; M. Petrov 47'; Aleksandrov 87'	Stadium: Ivaylo; Attendance: 600; Referee: Veselin Gatsev

== Second round ==
The matches will be played on 20 November 2010. On this stage the participants will be the 16 winners from the first round and the 16 teams from A Grupa. The team from the lower league has home advantage.

Note: Roman numerals in brackets denote the league tier the clubs participate in during the 2010–11 season.

20 November 2010	Chavdar Etropole (II)	0–1	Beroe Stara Zagora	Etropole
13:30 EET		Report	Zlatinov 42'	Stadium: Chavdar; Referee: Ivaylo Stoyanov (Petrich)

20 November 2010	Dobrudzha (II)	1–0	Botev Vratsa (II)	Dobrich
13:30 EET	Simeonov 16'	Report		Stadium: Druzhba; Referee: Velislav Yordanov (Ruse)

20 November 2010	Chernomorets Balchik (II)	1–2	Litex Lovech	Albena
13:30 EET	Pavlov 78'	Report	Doka 34'; Bratu 90+2'	Stadium: Albena; Attendance: 2,000; Referee: Anton Genov (Sofia)

20 November 2010	Montana	0–1	Cherno More Varna	Montana
13:30 EET		Report	Ratnikov 9'	Stadium: Ogosta; Referee: Vihren Manev (Sofia)

20 November 2010	Bansko (II)	1–3	Levski Sofia	Bansko
13:30 EET	Petkov 63'	Report	Dembélé 26', 76'; Shopov 31' (o.g.)	Stadium: Saint Peter; Attendance: 6,000; Referee: Nikolay Yordanov (Sofia)

20 November 2010	Botev Krivodol (II)	0–2 (a.e.t.)	Kom-Minyor Berkovitsa (II)	Mezdra
13:30 EET		Report	Kolev 108'; Mihaylov 111'	Stadium: Lokomotiv; Referee: Kolyo Danev (Varna)

20 November 2010	Minyor Pernik	1–1 (a.e.t.) (4–3 p)	Akademik Sofia	Pernik
13:30 EET	Markov 87'	Report	Sakaliev 15'; Asenov (yellow card) 12' (yellow-red card) 23'	Stadium: Minyor; Referee: Stanislav Todorov (Shumen)
	Penalties
	Janković (penalty missed); Vitanov (penalty scored); Todorov (penalty scored); Ivanović (penalty scored)		(penalty scored) Redovski; (penalty scored) Vasilev; (penalty missed) Kyumurdzhiev; (penalty missed) Dinchev; (penalty missed) Nikolov

20 November 2010	Malesh Mikrevo (II)	0–0 (a.e.t.) (5–4 p)	Vidima-Rakovski Sevlievo	Mikrevo
13:30 EET		Report		Stadium: Gradski; Referee: Atanas Dimitrov (Sliven)

20 November 2010	Sozopol (III)	0–1	Kaliakra Kavarna	Tsarevo
13:30 EET		Report	Stoilov 22'	Stadium: Gradski; Referee: Stanislav Stavrov (Veliko Tarnovo)

20 November 2010	Vihren (II)	0–5	Chernomorets Burgas	Sandanski
13:30 EET		Report	Ricardo 12'; Koita 17'; Hajri 37'; Fernández 78'; Mouithys 81'	Stadium: Sandanski; Referee: Georgi Kabakov (Plovdiv)

20 November 2010	Dorostol Silistra (II)	0–0 (a.e.t.) (3–5 p)	Pirin Blagoevgrad	Silistra
13:30 EET		Report		Stadium: Louis Ayer; Attendance: 4,700; Referee: Ivan Kirilov (Varna)
	Penalties
	Beadirov (penalty scored); Dimov (penalty missed); Dimitrov (penalty scored); Stanev (penalty scored)		(penalty scored) Sandanski; (penalty scored) Kostadinov; (penalty scored) Paskov; (penalty scored) Zlatkovski; (penalty scored) Todorov

20 November 2010	Chavdar Byala Slatina (II)	0–0 (a.e.t.) (2–4 p)	Etar Veliko Tarnovo (II)	Byala Slatina
13:30 EET		Report		Stadium: Chavdar; Attendance: 450; Referee: Stefan Apostolov (Blagoevgrad)
	Penalties
	Vasilev (penalty missed); T. Todorov (penalty scored); Kosturkov (penalty scored); Malkovski (penalty missed)		(penalty scored) Y. Petrov; (penalty scored) Avrionov; (penalty scored) Harlov; (penalty scored) Kyamil

20 November 2010	Ludogorets Razgrad (II)	0–2	Slavia Sofia	Razgrad
13:30 EET	Ginev (red card) 58'	Report	Bozhov 18', 45'	Stadium: Gradski; Referee: Stefan Spasov (Pernik)

20 November 2010	Topolite (III)	0–1	Chernomorets Pomorie (II)	Topoli
13:30 EET		Report	Pl. Dimov 45'	Stadium: Topoli; Attendance: 1,000; Referee: Dimitar Andreev (Kardzhali)

20 November 2010	Sliven	1–3	CSKA Sofia	Sliven
14:00 EET	Vasilev 23'	Report	Yanchev 56'; Delev 72'; Sheridan 90'	Stadium: Hadzhi Dimitar; Referee: Ahmed Ahmed (Burgas)

21 November 2010	Lokomotiv Sofia	0–0 (a.e.t.) (3–4 p)	Lokomotiv Plovdiv	Sofia
14:00 EET	Genkov (penalty missed); Yordanov (yellow card) 27'; Lahchev (yellow card) 47'; Garov (yellow card) 62'	Report	Ton (yellow card) 18'; Y. Bengelloun (yellow card) 45+1'; S. Bengelloun (yellow card) 58'; Lazarov (yellow card) 59'	Stadium: Lokomotiv; Attendance: 1,500; Referee: Aleksandar Kostadinov (Sofia)
	Penalties
	Dyakov (penalty scored); Lahchev (penalty missed) yordanov (penalty scored); Goranov (penalty scored); Genkov (penalty missed)		(penalty scored) Zlatinski; (penalty scored) Lazarov; (penalty scored) Y. Bengelloun; (penalty scored) Krachunov

== Third round ==
The matches will be played on 4 December 2010. On this stage the participants will be the 16 winners from the second round. The team from the lower league has home advantage.

Note: Roman numerals in brackets denote the league tier the clubs participate in during the 2010–11 season.

4 December 2010	Etar Veliko Tarnovo (II)	0–1	Slavia Sofia	Veliko Tarnovo
13:00 EET	Jayeoba (yellow card) 20'	Report	Dimitrov 40'	Stadium: Ivaylo; Attendance: 8,000; Referee: Tasko Taskov (Sofia)

4 December 2010	Pirin Blagoevgrad	3–1 (a.e.t.)	Kaliakra Kavarna	Blagoevgrad
13:00 EET	Yakimov 73'; Vodenicharov 105'; Georgiev 112'	Report	Filipov 37'	Stadium: Hristo Botev; Attendance: 250; Referee: Anton Genov (Sofia)

4 December 2010	Lokomotiv Plovdiv	2–1	Minyor Pernik	Plovdiv
13:00 EET	Zlatinski 48'; Lazarov 90'; De Carvalho (yellow card) 45'; Tom (yellow card) 75'; Kotsev (yellow card) 88'	Report	Janković 90+2'; Trajanov (yellow card) 17'; Vitanov (yellow card) 25'; Zlatkov (yellow card) 34'; Rangelov (yellow card) 61'	Stadium: Lauta; Attendance: 3,200; Referee: Radan Miryanov (Varna)

4 December 2010	Dobrudzha (II)	0–3	Chernomorets Burgas	Dobrich
13:00 EET		Report	Conkov 12'; Terziev 22'; Dyakov 74'	Stadium: Druzhba; Attendance: 3,500; Referee: Stanislav Todorov (Shumen)

4 December 2010	Chernomorets Pomorie (II)	0–2	Litex Lovech	Pomorie
13:00 EET		Report	Todorov 40' (pen.), 47'	Stadium: Pomorie Stadium; Attendance: 1,300; Referee: Atanas Dimitrov (Sliven)

4 December 2010	Kom-Minyor Berkovitsa (II)	0–1	Cherno More Varna	Berkovitsa
13:00 EET		Report	Ademar 75'	Stadium: Mramor; Attendance: 100; Referee: Aleksandar Kostadinov (Sofia)

8 December 2010	Levski Sofia	1–0	Beroe Stara Zagora	Sofia
16:00 EET	Gadzhev 82'	Report		Stadium: Georgi Asparuhov; Attendance: 3,100; Referee: Ahmed Ahmed (Aytos)

11 December 2010	Malesh Mikrevo (II)	0–3	CSKA Sofia	Mikrevo
13:00 EET		Report	Delev 60', 73'; Sheridan 64'	Stadium: Gradski; Attendance: 3,500; Referee: Nikolay Yordanov (Sofia)

== Quarter-finals ==
On this stage the participants will be the 8 winners from the third round.

5 April 2011	CSKA Sofia	2–0	Cherno More Varna	Sofia
18:00 EEST	Delev 34'; Marquinhos 67'	Report		Stadium: Vasil Levski; Attendance: 3,000; Referee: Georgi Yordanov (Gabrovo)

6 April 2011	Lokomotiv Plovdiv	1–2	Pirin Blagoevgrad	Plovdiv
16:00 EET	Krachunov 48'	Report	Tsvetkov 72'; R. Ivanov 90+2'	Stadium: Lauta; Attendance: 2,500; Referee: Ivan Kirilov (Varna)

6 April 2011	Litex Lovech	1–1 (a.e.t.) (4–2 p)	Levski Sofia	Lovech
18:00 EET	Tom 36' (pen.)	Report	Dembélé 79'	Stadium: Gradski; Attendance: 6,000; Referee: Lars Christoffersen (Denmark)
	Penalties
	Tom (penalty scored); Doka (penalty missed); Djermanovic (penalty scored); Todorov (penalty scored); Zanev (penalty scored)		(penalty scored) Dembélé; (penalty missed) Aleks; (penalty scored) Ognyanov; (penalty missed) Isa

7 April 2011	Chernomorets Burgas	4–4 (a.e.t.) (3–5 p)	Slavia Sofia	Burgas
19:00 EET	Bragança 3' (pen.); Andonov 32'; Seitz 78'; Andonov 92'	Report	Bozhov 16', 90+2'; Kushev 69'; Moldovanov 102'	Stadium: Lazur; Referee: Stefan Spasov (Pernik)
	Penalties
	Palankov (penalty scored); Dyankov (penalty scored); Bonev (penalty scored); Krumov (penalty missed)		(penalty scored) Bozhov; (penalty scored) Kushev; (penalty scored) Mansarov; (penalty scored) Dimitrov; (penalty scored) Jose Junior

== Semi-finals ==
On this stage participants will be the 4 winners from the quarterfinals.

20 April 2011	CSKA Sofia	2–1	Litex Lovech	Sofia
21:00 EET	Delev 27', 87'	Report	Milanov 68'	Stadium: Balgarska Armiya; Attendance: 14,000; Referee: Anton Genov (Sofia)

21 April 2011	Slavia Sofia	1–1 (a.e.t.) (7–6 p)	Pirin Blagoevgrad	Sofia
15:00 EET	Peev 45' (pen.)	Report	Nakov 70'	Stadium: Ovcha Kupel; Referee: Georgi Yordanov (Gabrovo)
	Penalties
	G. Hristov (penalty scored); Bozhov (penalty scored); Peev (penalty scored); Mansharov (penalty scored); Junior (penalty scored); Filipov (penalty scored); Dimitrov (penalty missed); Moldovanov (penalty scored)		(penalty scored) Sandanski; (penalty scored) Nakov; (penalty scored) Popev; (penalty scored) Bibishkov; (penalty scored) Tsvetkov; (penalty scored) Yakimov; (penalty missed) Karachanakov; (penalty missed) Rizov

== Final ==
25 May 2011
19:00 EET

CSKA Sofia	1–0	Slavia Sofia
Delev 39'	Report

Vasil Levski, Sofia
Attendance: 17,500
Referee: Ivaylo Stoyanov (Petrich)

== See also ==
- 2010–11 A Group
- 2010–11 B Group
- 2010–11 V AFG
