= 2016–17 First Professional Football League (Bulgaria) =

93rd season of top-tier football league in Bulgaria

First Professional Football League
- Season: 2016–17
- Dates: 29 July 2016 – 4 June 2017
- Champions: Ludogorets Razgrad (6th title)
- Relegated: Neftochimic; Montana; Lokomotiv GO
- Champions League: Ludogorets Razgrad
- Europa League: Botev Plovdiv; Levski Sofia; Dunav Ruse
- Matches: 240
- Goals: 616 (2.57 per match)
- Top goalscorer: (Romania) Claudiu Keșerü (22)
- Best goalkeeper: (Bulgaria) Georgi Kitanov (18 clean sheets)
- Biggest home win: Botev Plovdiv 7–1 Montana (7 April 2017)
- Biggest away win: Lokomotiv GO 0–5 Ludogorets Razgrad (12 March 2017)
- Highest scoring: Dunav Ruse 3–5 Ludogorets Razgrad (28 October 2016); Botev Plovdiv 7–1 Montana (7 April 2017)
- Longest winning run: 13 games by Ludogorets Razgrad
- Longest unbeaten run: 24 games by Ludogorets Razgrad
- Longest winless run: 10 games by Lokomotiv GO
- Longest losing run: 7 games by Montana
- Highest attendance: ~21,000; CSKA Sofia 1–1 Levski Sofia (15 October 2016); Levski Sofia 2–1 CSKA Sofia (4 March 2017)
- Lowest attendance: ~20; Montana 1–1 Vereya (10 May 2017)
- All statistics correct as of 31 May 2017.

The 2016–17 First Professional Football League is the 93rd season of the top division of the Bulgarian football league system, the 69th since a league format was adopted for the national competition of A Group as a top tier of the pyramid and also the inaugural season of the First Professional Football League, which decides the Bulgarian champion. The season is the first with a new league structure and strict financial criteria where 14 clubs play each other home and away, until the league is split up in championship and relegation playoffs. The new league structure, inspired by the ones used by the Belgian First Division A and Danish Superliga, was approved by the Bulgarian Football Union on 6 June 2016. The fixtures were announced on 8 July 2016.

On 5 May 2017, five rounds before the end of the championship, after winning the away match with Lokomotiv Plovdiv, Ludogorets Razgrad managed to secure the title for a sixth consecutive and overall time. Ludogorets finished 16 points ahead of CSKA Sofia. Levski Sofia finished third.

== Competition format ==
Starting from the 2016–17 season, a new league format was approved by the Bulgarian Football Union, in an attempt to improve each participating club's competitiveness, match attendance and performance in the league, alongside strict financial criteria. It involves 14 teams playing in two phases, a regular season and playoffs. The first phase includes each club competing against every other team twice in a double round-robin system, on a home-away basis at a total of 26 games per team, also played in 26 fixtures. Seven matches are played in every fixture at a total of 182 games during the first phase. In the second phase, the top six teams form a European qualifying table, while the bottom eight teams participate in a relegation group. The winner of the top group is declared as Champions of Bulgaria and is awarded with the title.

=== International qualification ===
The six top teams compete against each other on a home-away basis. Three matches are played in every fixture of the top six, with the results and points after the regular season also included. At the end of the stage, every team will have played a total of 36 games. The winner of the group is declared as Champions of Bulgaria and automatically secures participation in the 2017-18 UEFA Champions League second qualifying round. The team that ranks second is awarded with a place in the UEFA Europa League qualifying rounds. The third team in the final standings would participate in a play-off match against a representative team from the bottom eight. Depending on the winner of the Bulgarian Cup final, a possible fourth team from the first six may compete in a play-off match for an UEFA Europa League spot instead of the third ranked team.

Note: If the Bulgarian Cup winner has secured its qualification for the European tournaments for the next season through results from Parva Liga, then the place in the UEFA Europa League play-off is awarded to the fourth ranked team in the final standings.

=== Relegation ===
The teams in the bottom eight are split in two sub-groups of four teams, Group A and Group B, depending on their final position after the regular season standings. The teams that enter Group A are the 7th, 10th, 11th and the 14th, and the teams that participate in Group B are the 8th, 9th, 12th and the 13th. Every participant plays twice against the other three teams in their group on a home-away basis. The teams from the bottom eight also compete with the results from the regular season. After the group stages, every team will have played a total number of 32 games. Depending on their final position in Group A and Group B, two sections will be formed, one for a play-off spot in next season's European competitions and one to avoid relegation. The first two teams from each group continue in the semi-finals, and the last two teams of each group continue to the semi-finals for a relegation match. After this phase, one team is directly relegated to the Second League and the remaining two teams will compete in two relegation matches against the second and the third ranked clubs from the Second League.

=== Tiebreakers ===
In case of a tie on points between two or more clubs, tiebreakers are applied in the following order:

1. Number of wins;
2. Goal difference;
3. Goals pro;
4. Goals away;
5. Fewer red cards;
6. Fewest yellow cards;
7. Draw

== Teams ==
Prior to the start of the season, the Bulgarian Football Union announced that every Bulgarian professional football club's application would be considered for the upcoming season, as long as it fulfills the financial criteria. A total of 14 teams would be contesting the league, including the 9 sides from the previous season, plus five promoted clubs from the lower B Group, which would be issued a license by the Bulgarian Football Union. The five approved applications from the lower division were the B Group's last year champions Dunav Ruse, alongside Lokomotiv GO, Neftochimic, Vereya and CSKA Sofia respectively.

Dunav return after a 25-year absence from the top flight, Lokomotiv Gorna Oryahovitsa return after a 21-year absence, Neftochimic return after a two-year absence, Vereya made its debut in the top flight, while CSKA Sofia return after a one-year absence, having played in the third tier the previous season, but managing to administratively promote back to the elite.

=== Stadia and locations ===
Note: From the 2016–17 season onwards, all participating clubs are required to have electric floodlights and adequate pitch conditions under the BFU and TV broadcaster's new licensing criteria. The following stadiums below have either obtained a license under UEFA's category ranking or fulfill the licensing criteria.

Location of teams in 2016–17 First League
Sofia 2016–17 First League football clubs

Team	Location	Stadium	Capacity (seating)
Beroe	Stara Zagora	Beroe	12,128
Botev	Plovdiv	Botev 1912 Football Complex	4,000
Cherno More	Varna	Stadion Kavarna, Kavarna	5,000
CSKA	Sofia	Balgarska Armia	18,495
Dunav	Ruse	Gradski	12,400
Levski	Sofia	Vivacom Arena - Georgi Asparuhov	25,000
Lokomotiv	Gorna Oryahovitsa	Lokomotiv	10,500
Lokomotiv	Plovdiv	Lokomotiv	13,000
Ludogorets	Razgrad	Ludogorets Arena	8,808
Montana	Montana	Gradski	6,000
Neftochimic	Burgas	Lazur	18,037
Pirin	Blagoevgrad	Hristo Botev	7,000
Slavia	Sofia	Vasil Levski National Stadium	43,230
Vereya	Stara Zagora	Trace Arena	3,500

Note: On June 15, 2016, the Ministry of Youth and Sports of Bulgaria granted 3 mln. BGN in total for stadium renovations to the following three clubs – Cherno More, Dunav and Lokomotiv GO.

=== Personnel and sponsorship ===
Note: Flags indicate national team as has been defined under FIFA eligibility rules. Players and managers may hold more than one non-FIFA nationality.

Team	Manager	Captain	Kit manufacturer	Shirt sponsor	Additional
Beroe	(Bulgaria) Ferario Spasov	(Bulgaria) Ivo Ivanov	Uhlsport	—	Refan
Botev Plovdiv	(Bulgaria) Nikolay Kirov	(Bulgaria) Lachezar Baltanov	Joma	efbet	—
CSKA Sofia	(Bulgaria) Stamen Belchev	(Bulgaria) Bozhidar Chorbadzhiyski	Adidas	Mtel	WinBet
Cherno More	(Bulgaria) Georgi Ivanov	(Bulgaria) Georgi Iliev	Uhlsport	Armeets	—
Dunav Ruse	(Bulgaria) Veselin Velikov	(Bulgaria) Diyan Dimov	Joma	—	—
Levski Sofia	(Bulgaria) Nikolay Mitov	(Bulgaria) Veselin Minev	Joma	Vivacom	Strabag, efbet, Spetema
Lokomotiv Gorna Oryahovitsa	(Bulgaria) Aleksandar Dimitrov	(Bulgaria) Atanas Fidanin	Krasiko	efbet	Prity, Enel, Go Grill
Lokomotiv Plovdiv	(Bulgaria) Voyn Voynov	(Bulgaria) Martin Kamburov	Uhlsport	efbet	—
Ludogorets Razgrad	(Bulgaria) Georgi Dermendzhiev	(Bulgaria) Svetoslav Dyakov	Macron	bet365	Vivacom, Spetema
Montana	(Bulgaria) Atanas Atanasov	(Bulgaria) Ivan Mihov	Jako	efbet	—
Neftochimic	(Bulgaria) Hristo Yanev	(Bulgaria) Lyubomir Bozhinov	Krasiko	Masterhaus	—
Pirin Blagoevgrad	(Bulgaria) Milen Radukanov	(Bulgaria) Yuliyan Popev	Erreà	—	—
Slavia Sofia	(Bulgaria) Zlatomir Zagorčić	(Bulgaria) Georgi Petkov	Joma	bet365	—
Vereya	(Bulgaria) Aleksandar Tomash	(Brazil) Elias	Erreà	Trace Group	Spetema

Note: Individual clubs may wear jerseys with advertising. However, only one sponsorship is permitted per jersey for official tournaments organised by UEFA in addition to that of the kit manufacturer (exceptions are made for non-profit organisations). Clubs in the domestic league can have more than one sponsorship per jersey which can feature on the front of the shirt, incorporated with the main sponsor or in place of it; or on the back, either below the squad number or on the collar area. Shorts also have space available for advertisement.

=== Managerial changes ===
Team	Outgoing manager	Manner of departure	Date of vacancy	Position in table	Incoming manager	Date of appointment
Beroe	(Bulgaria) Plamen Lipenski	End of caretaker tenure	31 May 2016	Pre-season	(Bulgaria) Aleksandar Dimitrov	31 May 2016
Montana	(Bulgaria) Emil Velev	Sacked	31 May 2016	Pre-season	(North Macedonia) Stevica Kuzmanovski	10 June 2016
Vereya	(Bulgaria) Zhivko Zhelev	End of contract	31 May 2016	Pre-season	(Bulgaria) Aleksandar Tomash	10 June 2016
Lokomotiv GO	(Bulgaria) Aleksandar Tomash	Sacked	8 June 2016	Pre-season	(Bulgaria) Angel Chervenkov	8 June 2016
Cherno More	(Bulgaria) Nikola Spasov	Mutual consent	10 June 2016	Pre-season	(Bulgaria) Georgi Ivanov	21 June 2016
Pirin Blagoevgrad	(Kosovo) Naci Şensoy	End of contract	20 June 2016	Pre-season	(Bulgaria) Stefan Genov	20 June 2016
CSKA Sofia	(Bulgaria) Hristo Yanev	Resigned	21 August 2016	3rd	(Romania) Edward Iordănescu	24 August 2016
Botev Plovdiv	(Bulgaria) Nikolay Kostov	Resigned	23 August 2016	10th	(Bulgaria) Nikolay Mitov	30 August 2016
Botev Plovdiv	(Bulgaria) Nikolay Mitov	Resigned	30 August 2016	8th	(Bulgaria) Nikolay Kirov^{a}	1 September 2016
Neftochimic	(Bulgaria) Dimcho Nenov	Sacked	17 September 2016	13th	(Bulgaria) Hristo Yanev	17 September 2016
Lokomotiv GO	(Bulgaria) Angel Chervenkov	Sacked	28 September 2016	14th	(Bulgaria) Ivan Kolev	28 September 2016
Montana	(North Macedonia) Stevica Kuzmanovski	Sacked	3 October 2016	13th	(Bulgaria) Atanas Dzhambazki^{b}	4 October 2016
Beroe	(Bulgaria) Aleksandar Dimitrov	Resigned	17 October 2016	7th	(Bulgaria) Plamen Lipenski (interim)	20 October 2016
Lokomotiv Plovdiv	(Bulgaria) Ilian Iliev	Resigned	17 October 2016	9th	(Bulgaria) Hristo Kolev (interim)	18 October 2016
Levski Sofia	(Serbia) Ljupko Petrović	Resigned	22 October 2016	1st	(Bulgaria) Elin Topuzakov^{c}	24 October 2016
Beroe	(Bulgaria) Plamen Lipenski	End of caretaker tenure	26 October 2016	8th	(Bulgaria) Ferario Spasov	26 October 2016
Lokomotiv Plovdiv	(Bulgaria) Hristo Kolev	End of caretaker tenure	31 October 2016	7th	(Bulgaria) Eduard Eranosyan	31 October 2016
Slavia Sofia	(Russia) Aleksandr Tarkhanov	Signed by (Russia) Ural Sverdlovsk Oblast	2 November 2016	10th	(Bulgaria) Vladimir Ivanov	3 November 2016
CSKA Sofia	(Romania) Edward Iordănescu	Resigned	27 November 2016	5th	(Bulgaria) Stamen Belchev^{d}	27 November 2016
Pirin Blagoevgrad	(Bulgaria) Stefan Genov	Signed by CSKA Sofia	9 January 2017	11th	(Bulgaria) Milen Radukanov	13 January 2017
Lokomotiv GO	(Bulgaria) Ivan Kolev	Resigned	2 March 2017	13th	(Bulgaria) Milcho Sirmov (interim)	2 March 2017
Levski Sofia	(Bulgaria) Elin Topuzakov	Mutual consent	2 March 2017	2nd	(Bulgaria) Nikolay Mitov	2 March 2017
Lokomotiv GO	(Bulgaria) Milcho Sirmov	End of caretaker tenure	14 March 2017	13th	(Bulgaria) Aleksandar Dimitrov	14 March 2017
Lokomotiv Plovdiv	(Bulgaria) Eduard Eranosyan	Resigned	9 April 2017	5th	(Bulgaria) Stoyan Kolev (interim)	12 April 2017
Montana	(Bulgaria) Atanas Dzhambazki	Resigned	17 April 2017	4th/Group A	(Bulgaria) Dilyan Ivanov (interim)	17 April 2017
Lokomotiv Plovdiv	(Bulgaria) Stoyan Kolev	End of caretaker tenure	19 April 2017	6th	(Bulgaria) Voyn Voynov	19 April 2017
Montana	(Bulgaria) Dilyan Ivanov	End of caretaker tenure	24 April 2017	4th/Group A	(Bulgaria) Atanas Atanasov	24 April 2017
Slavia Sofia	(Bulgaria) Vladimir Ivanov	Demoted to assistant	11 May 2017	3rd/Group A	(Bulgaria) Zlatomir Zagorčić	11 May 2017

a.Initially interim, made permanent 19 January 2017.
b.Initially interim, made permanent 16 December 2016.
c.Initially interim, made permanent 16 November 2016.
d.Initially interim, made permanent 3 January 2017.

== Regular season ==
=== League table ===
Pos	Team	Pld	W	D	L	GF	GA	GD	Pts	Qualification
1	Ludogorets Razgrad	26	21	4	1	69	19	+50	67	Qualification for the championship round
2	Levski Sofia	26	15	6	5	38	17	+21	51	Qualification for the championship round
3	CSKA Sofia	26	13	7	6	35	16	+19	46	Qualification for the championship round
4	Cherno More	26	12	7	7	30	24	+6	43	Qualification for the championship round
5	Lokomotiv Plovdiv	26	10	9	7	35	30	+5	39	Qualification for the championship round
6	Dunav Ruse	26	10	8	8	32	31	+1	38	Qualification for the championship round
7	Botev Plovdiv	26	10	5	11	36	42	−6	35 (Note: Botev Plovdiv ahead of Beroe on head-to-head record; Beroe–Botev Plovdiv 3–4, Botev Plovdiv–Beroe 2–0.)	Qualification for the relegation round
8	Beroe	26	10	5	11	27	28	−1	35	Qualification for the relegation round
9	Pirin Blagoevgrad	26	10	4	12	30	36	−6	34	Qualification for the relegation round
10	Vereya	26	8	6	12	22	36	−14	30	Qualification for the relegation round
11	Slavia Sofia	26	8	4	14	30	45	−15	28	Qualification for the relegation round
12	Neftochimic	26	7	5	14	27	37	−10	26	Qualification for the relegation round
13	Lokomotiv Gorna Oryahovitsa	26	5	7	14	22	39	−17	22	Qualification for the relegation round
14	Montana	26	3	3	20	16	49	−33	12	Qualification for the relegation round

Source: Bulgarian Football Union, Soccerway
Rules for classification: 1) Points; 2) Head-to-head points; 3) Head-to-head goal difference; 4) Head-to-head goals scored; 5) Head-to-head away goals scored (only if two teams); 6) Goal difference; 7) Goals scored; 8) Fairplay ranking; 9) Draw.

=== Results ===
Home \ Away	BSZ	BOT	CHM	CSK	DUN	LEV	LGO	LPL	LUD	MON	NEF	PIR	SLA	VER
Beroe		3–4	0–1	0–1	0–0	1–0	1–1	3–2	0–2	2–1	2–0	1–0	1–1	1–0
Botev Plovdiv	2–0		2–3	0–0	0–2	1–1	4–0	1–1	1–3	2–0	2–1	3–2	3–2	2–1
Cherno More	1–0	1–1		0–2	1–0	1–0	1–1	2–0	1–3	1–0	3–1	0–0	0–0	2–1
CSKA Sofia	4–0	0–0	1–0		3–0	1–1	2–0	0–1	0–2	2–1	5–1	2–0	2–0	1–1
Dunav Ruse	0–4	1–2	3–0	2–0		2–2	1–0	1–1	3–5	1–1	3–0	1–0	1–1	0–0
Levski Sofia	2–0	2–0	1–0	2–1	2–0		1–1	1–2	1–0	0–0	1–0	2–0	1–0	4–0
Lokomotiv G. Oryahovitsa	0–1	0–1	2–2	0–0	0–2	0–1		2–1	0–5	0–1	0–0	1–0	1–0	5–0
Lokomotiv Plovdiv	1–1	2–0	1–0	1–1	0–0	2–2	2–1		2–2	2–0	0–0	2–3	1–1	3–1
Ludogorets Razgrad	1–0	4–1	1–1	2–1	2–2	2–1	4–0	1–0		2–0	3–1	3–0	3–1	4–0
Montana	0–3	3–1	0–2	0–2	1–2	1–3	2–4	0–3	0–4		2–0	1–2	1–2	1–1
Neftochimic	1–0	4–0	1–3	0–2	1–2	1–2	1–1	1–2	1–1	2–0		3–1	2–0	1–0
Pirin Blagoevgrad	1–1	2–1	1–3	1–1	4–1	1–0	2–1	1–0	1–3	1–0	1–0		4–0	1–1
Slavia Sofia	1–2	3–2	2–1	0–1	0–2	0–4	3–1	5–2	0–2	2–0	0–3	3–1		3–1
Vereya	1–0	1–0	0–0	1–0	1–0	0–1	1–0	0–1	1–5	3–0	1–1	2–0	3–0	

Source: bulgarian-football.com
Legend: Blue = home team win; Yellow = draw; Red = away team win.

=== Positions by round ===
Team ╲ Round	1	2	3	4	5	6	7	8	9	10	11	12	13	14	15	16	17	18	19	20	21	22	23	24	25	26
Ludogorets Razgrad	12	4	9	6	6	4	3	3	2	2	2	2	1	1	1	1	1	1	1	1	1	1	1	1	1	1
Levski Sofia	6	8	5	3	2	2	1	1	1	1	1	1	2	2	2	2	2	2	2	2	2	2	2	2	2	2
CSKA Sofia	2	6	3	5	3	6	4	4	4	4	3	4	5	3	5	3	3	3	3	3	3	3	3	3	3	3
Cherno More	1	1	1	1	4	7	7	8	6	6	4	3	3	4	3	4	6	4	4	5	5	4	5	5	4	4
Lokomotiv Plovdiv	3	9	6	8	9	11	9	7	9	9	10	7	8	6	6	5	4	5	5	4	4	5	4	4	5	5
Dunav Ruse	5	2	2	2	1	1	2	2	3	3	5	5	4	5	4	6	5	6	6	6	6	6	6	6	6	6
Botev Plovdiv	4	13	8	10	8	9	8	5	5	5	6	6	6	8	8	8	8	9	7	7	7	8	7	7	7	7
Beroe	11	5	4	7	5	3	5	6	7	7	8	8	7	9	9	9	9	7	8	8	8	9	10	9	8	8
Pirin Blagoevgrad	13	7	10	9	10	8	10	9	8	8	9	9	10	10	11	10	10	11	11	10	9	7	8	8	9	9
Vereya	10	3	7	4	7	5	6	10	11	11	11	11	9	7	7	7	7	8	9	9	11	10	9	10	10	10
Slavia Sofia	14	14	14	14	12	10	11	11	10	10	7	10	11	11	12	11	11	10	10	11	10	11	11	12	11	11
Neftochimic	9	11	13	11	11	12	13	13	14	13	12	13	12	13	13	13	13	13	13	13	13	12	12	11	12	12
Lokomotiv Gorna Oryahovitsa	7	10	11	12	13	13	14	14	12	12	13	12	13	12	10	12	12	12	12	12	12	13	13	13	13	13
Montana	8	12	12	13	14	14	12	12	13	14	14	14	14	14	14	14	14	14	14	14	14	14	14	14	14	14

Source: en.bulgarian-football.com

=== Results by round ===
Team ╲ Round	1	2	3	4	5	6	7	8	9	10	11	12	13	14	15	16	17	18	19	20	21	22	23	24	25	26
Beroe	L	W	W	L	W	W	D	L	L	L	L	W	D	L	D	L	W	D	D	W	L	L	L	W	W	W
Botev Plovdiv	D	L	W	L	W	L	W	W	D	W	L	D	L	L	L	L	W	L	W	W	L	D	W	D	L	W
Cherno More	W	W	D	W	L	L	L	D	W	W	W	W	L	D	W	D	L	W	D	L	L	W	D	D	W	W
CSKA Sofia	W	L	W	D	W	L	W	W	D	D	W	L	L	W	D	W	W	D	W	W	W	D	L	W	D	L
Dunav Ruse	D	W	W	W	W	W	D	L	L	D	D	L	W	L	W	L	W	L	L	L	W	D	W	D	D	D
Montana	D	L	L	L	L	L	W	L	L	D	L	L	W	L	L	L	L	L	D	L	L	W	L	L	L	L
Neftohimic	D	L	L	W	L	L	L	L	L	W	D	L	W	D	L	L	L	W	L	W	D	D	W	W	L	L
Levski Sofia	D	D	W	W	W	W	W	W	W	D	W	D	W	W	L	L	W	W	W	L	D	D	W	L	W	L
Lokomotiv Gorna Oryahovitsa	D	L	D	L	L	L	L	L	W	W	L	W	L	D	W	D	L	D	D	L	D	L	L	L	L	W
Lokomotiv Plovdiv	D	D	W	L	D	L	W	W	L	L	D	W	D	W	W	W	W	L	D	W	D	L	W	D	D	L
Ludogorets	W	W	L	W	D	W	W	W	W	W	W	W	W	W	W	W	W	W	D	W	W	D	W	W	D	W
Pirin Blagievgrad	L	W	L	D	L	W	L	W	W	L	L	D	L	D	L	W	L	D	L	W	W	W	L	W	L	W
Slavia Sofia	L	L	L	L	W	W	L	D	W	L	W	L	L	L	D	W	L	W	D	L	W	L	L	L	W	D
Vereya	D	W	L	W	L	W	L	L	L	L	D	D	W	W	D	W	L	L	D	L	L	W	D	L	W	L

Source: bulgarian-football.com
W = Win; D = Draw; L = Loss

== Championship round ==
Points and goals will carry over in full from regular season.

Pos	Team	Pld	W	D	L	GF	GA	GD	Pts	Qualification	LUD	CSK	LEV	DUN	LPL	CHM
1	Ludogorets Razgrad (C)	36	25	8	3	87	28	+59	83	Qualification for the Champions League second qualifying round	—	1–1	0–0	0–1	1–2	4–0
2	CSKA Sofia (Note: On 29 May 2017 a UEFA letter to the Bulgarian Football Union declared that CSKA Sofia were not allowed to compete in European tournaments for the following two seasons as they were considered to have been re-formed as a new club and thus did not pass the "three-year rule". As this decision was appealed by CSKA Sofia, the Bulgarian Football Union granted a license to them subject to legal proceedings. A few hours prior to the Europa League first qualifying round draw, UEFA replaced them by Dunav Ruse, the fourth-placed team of the league.)	36	19	10	7	51	21	+30	67		1–1	—	3–0	2–0	0–0	3–1
3	Levski Sofia (O)	36	18	9	9	50	31	+19	63	Qualification for the European play-off final	1–3	0–3	—	1–1	5–0	2–2
4	Dunav Ruse	36	15	10	11	46	44	+2	55	Qualification for the Europa League first qualifying round	2–2	1–0	0–1	—	2–3	1–0
5	Lokomotiv Plovdiv	36	14	10	12	50	52	−2	52		0–3	1–2	2–1	3–4	—	2–1
6	Cherno More Varna	36	13	8	15	39	45	−6	47		1–3	0–1	0–1	1–2	3–2	—

Source: Soccerway
Legend: Blue = home team win; Yellow = draw; Red = away team win.
Rules for classification: 1) Points; 2) Head-to-head points; 3) Head-to-head goal difference; 4) Head-to-head goals scored; 5) Head-to-head away goals scored (only if two teams); 6) Goal difference; 7) Goals scored; 8) Fairplay ranking; 9) Draw.
(C) Champions; (O) Play-off winners

=== Positions by round ===
Below the positions per round are shown. As teams did not all start with an equal number of points, the initial pre-playoffs positions are also given.

Team ╲ Round	Initial	1	2	3	4	5	6	7	8	9	10
Ludogorets Razgrad	1	1	1	1	1	1	1	1	1	1	1
CSKA Sofia	3	3	3	3	2	2	2	2	2	2	2
Levski Sofia	2	2	2	2	3	3	3	3	3	3	3
Dunav Ruse	6	5	4	5	5	5	4	4	5	4	4
Lokomotiv Plovdiv	5	6	6	6	6	6	6	6	4	5	5
Cherno More	4	4	5	4	4	4	5	5	6	6	6

Source: bulgarian-football.com

== Relegation round ==
Points and goals will carry over in full from regular season.

=== Group A ===
Pos	Team	Pld	W	D	L	GF	GA	GD	Pts	Qualification or relegation	VER	BOT	SLA	MON
1	Vereya	32	13	6	13	31	40	−9	45	Qualification for the European play-off quarter-finals	—	3–1	0–1	1–0
2	Botev Plovdiv	32	13	5	14	51	50	+1	44	Qualification for the Europa League first qualifying round (Note: Botev Plovdiv qualified for the Europa League first qualifying round by winning the 2016–17 Bulgarian Cup.)	0–1	—	3–1	7–1
3	Slavia Sofia (O)	32	11	4	17	37	55	−18	37	Qualification for the relegation play-offs	0–1	0–3	—	1–0
4	Montana (R)	32	4	3	25	24	66	−42	15	Qualification for the relegation play-offs	2–3	2–1	3–4	—

Source: Soccerway
Legend: Blue = home team win; Yellow = draw; Red = away team win.
Rules for classification: 1) Points; 2) Head-to-head points; 3) Head-to-head goal difference; 4) Head-to-head goals scored; 5) Head-to-head away goals scored (only if two teams); 6) Goal difference; 7) Goals scored; 8) Fairplay ranking; 9) Draw.
(O) Play-off winners; (R) Relegated

=== Group B ===
Pos	Team	Pld	W	D	L	GF	GA	GD	Pts	Qualification or relegation	BSZ	PIR	NEF	LGO
1	Beroe	32	12	8	12	35	33	+2	44	Qualification for the European play-off quarter-finals	—	1–1	3–0	2–3
2	Pirin Blagoevgrad	32	12	7	13	41	44	−3	43	Qualification for the European play-off quarter-finals	1–1	—	2–1	1–1
3	Neftochimic (R)	32	8	7	17	33	47	−14	31	Qualification for the relegation play-offs	0–0	0–3	—	4–1
4	Lokomotiv Gorna Oryahovitsa (R)	32	7	9	16	32	51	−19	30	Qualification for the relegation play-offs	0–1	4–3	1–1	—

Source: Soccerway
Legend: Blue = home team win; Yellow = draw; Red = away team win.
Rules for classification: 1) Points; 2) Head-to-head points; 3) Head-to-head goal difference; 4) Head-to-head goals scored; 5) Head-to-head away goals scored (only if two teams); 6) Goal difference; 7) Goals scored; 8) Fairplay ranking; 9) Draw.
(R) Relegated

== European play-offs ==
=== Bracket ===
Quarter-finals
16 and 20 May
Pirin Blagoevgrad	1	0	1
Vereya	1	1	2
15 and 19 May
Botev Plovdiv	3	1	4
Beroe	0	2	2

Semi-finals
27 and 30 May
Vereya	–	–	—
Botev Plovdiv	–	–	—

Final
4 June
Levski Sofia	1 (9)
Vereya	1 (8)

=== European play-off quarter-finals ===
15 May 2017
20:00 EEST

Botev Plovdiv	3–0	Beroe
Kossoko 14'; Viana 45'; Vutov 81'	Report

Botev 1912 Football Complex, Plovdiv
Attendance: 1,700
Referee: Angel Angelov (Sofia)
19 May 2017
20:00 EEST

Beroe	2–1	Botev Plovdiv
K. Dimitrov 15' (o.g.); Mapuku 75'	Report	Vutov 64'

Beroe, Stara Zagora
Attendance: 850
Referee: Dragomir Draganov (Varna)

16 May 2017
17:30 EEST

Pirin Blagoevgrad	1–1	Vereya
Tsvetkov 81'	Report	Bandalovski 90+3'

Hristo Botev, Blagoevgrad
Attendance: 650
Referee: Stanislav Stavrov (Veliko Tarnovo)
20 May 2017
17:30 EEST

Vereya	1–0	Pirin Blagoevgrad
Kaloyanov 44'	Report

Trace Arena, Stara Zagora
Attendance: 180
Referee: Vladimir Valkov (Plovdiv)

=== European play-off semi-finals ===
27 May 2017
20:00 EEST

Vereya	Not Played	Botev Plovdiv

Trace Arena, Stara Zagora
30 May 2017
20:00 EEST

Botev Plovdiv	Not Played	Vereya

Botev 1912 Football Complex, Plovdiv

Since Botev Plovdiv qualified for the Europa League first qualifying round by winning the 2016–17 Bulgarian Cup, the semi-finals were not held and Vereya qualified automatically for the play-off final.

=== European play-off final ===
4 June 2017
20:00 EEST

Levski Sofia	1–1 (a.e.t.)	Vereya
Kraev 44'	Report	Bandalovski 90+3'
Penalties
Procházka (penalty scored); Kraev (penalty scored); Bourabia (penalty missed); S. Aleksandrov (penalty missed); Borimirov (penalty scored); Ognyanov (penalty scored); Jablonský (penalty scored); Pirgov (penalty scored); S. Ivanov (penalty scored); Mitrev (penalty scored); Naydenov (penalty scored)	9–8	(penalty scored) Andonov; (penalty scored) Domovchiyski; (penalty scored) Tsvetanov; (penalty missed) Eugénio; (penalty missed) Elias; (penalty scored) Zafirov; (penalty scored) Kerkar; (penalty scored) Angelov; (penalty scored) Bandalovski; (penalty scored) Inkoom; (penalty missed) Kolev

Vivacom Arena - Georgi Asparuhov Stadium, Sofia
Attendance: 2,000
Referee: Stefan Apostolov (Simitli)

== Relegation play-offs ==
=== Bracket ===
First round
Match 1
Montana	1	1	2
Neftochimic	3	2	5
Match 2
Lokomotiv GO	0	1	1
Slavia Sofia	3	1	4

Second round
Match 3
Neftochimic	0	2	2
Slavia Sofia	1	5	6
Match 4
Montana	1	3	4
Lokomotiv GO	1	0	1

Third round
Match 5
Neftochimic	0
Vitosha Bistritsa	1
Match 6
Montana	1
Septemvri Sofia	2

Winners of matches 3, 5 and 6 will play in the top division next season

=== First round ===
18 May 2017
17:30 EEST

Montana	1–3	Neftochimic
Atanasov 90+3'	Report	Hazurov 16' (pen.), 55'; Romanov 21'

Gradski, Lovech
Attendance: 50
Referee: Georgi Kabakov (Plovdiv)
22 May 2017
17:30 EEST

Neftochimic	2–1	Montana
Milanov 71'; Ivanov 80'	Report	Atanasov 24'

Lazur, Burgas
Attendance: 370
Referee: Stefan Apostolov (Simitli)

18 May 2017
19:45 EEST

Lokomotiv Gorna Oryahovitsa	0–3	Slavia Sofia
	Report	Dimitrov 45', 62'; Serderov 58'

Lokomotiv, Gorna Oryahovitsa
Attendance: 2,500
Referee: Nikola Popov (Sofia)
22 May 2017
20:00 EEST

Slavia Sofia	1–1	Lokomotiv Gorna Oryahovitsa
Omar 29'	Report	Kirev 38' (o.g.)

Vasil Levski National Stadium, Sofia
Attendance: 90
Referee: Ivaylo Stoyanov (Petrich)

=== Second round ===
26 May 2017
20:00 EEST

Neftochimic	0–1	Slavia Sofia
	Report	Yomov 9'

Lazur, Burgas
Attendance: 700
Referee: Dragomir Draganov (Varna)
29 May 2017
20:00 EEST

Slavia Sofia	5–2	Neftochimic
Serderov 2'; Hashev 5' (o.g.); Dimitrov 17', 64'; Velev 72'	Report	Hashev 57'; Ognyanov 87'

Vasil Levski National Stadium, Sofia
Attendance: 130
Referee: Nikola Popov (Sofia)

Slavia Sofia qualify for the 2017–18 First League.

26 May 2017
17:45 EEST

Montana	1–1	Lokomotiv Gorna Oryahovitsa
Atanasov 17'	Report	Kifouéti 25'

Gradski, Lovech
Attendance: 170
Referee: Georgi Dimitrov (Sofia)
29 May 2017
17:30 EEST

Lokomotiv Gorna Oryahovitsa	0–3	Montana
	Report	Iliev 10', 49'; Genov 19'

Lokomotiv, Gorna Oryahovitsa
Attendance: 800
Referee: Ivaylo Stoyanov (Petrich)

Lokomotiv Gorna Oryahovitsa are relegated to the 2017–18 Second League.

=== Third round ===
2 June 2017
20:00 EEST

Neftochimic	0–1	Vitosha Bistritsa
	Report	Otofe 58'

Trace Arena, Stara Zagora
Attendance: 350
Referee: Stanislav Todorov (Shumen)
3 June 2017
18:30 EEST

Montana	1–2	Septemvri Sofia
Iliev 67'	Report	Angelov 3'; Galchev 11'

Lokomotiv, Plovdiv
Attendance: 200
Referee: Nikola Popov (Sofia)

Neftochimic and Montana are relegated to the 2017–18 Second League. Vitosha Bistritsa and Septemvri Sofia are promoted to the 2017–18 First League.

== Season statistics ==
Round	Goal of the week	Club	Save of the week	Club
1	(Portugal) Diogo Viana vs Slavia	CSKA Sofia		
2	(Bulgaria) Aleksandar Vasilev vs Slavia	Beroe	(Bulgaria) Hristo Ivanov vs Cherno More	Montana
3	(Portugal) Diogo Viana vs Neftochimic	CSKA Sofia	(Bulgaria) Vladislav Stoyanov vs Levski Sofia	Ludogorets
4	(Bulgaria) Georgi Kostadinov vs Slavia	Levski Sofia	(Greece) Antonis Stergiakis vs Levski Sofia	Slavia
5	(Bulgaria) Bozhidar Kraev vs Vereya	Levski Sofia	(Bulgaria) Georgi Petkov vs Montana	Slavia
6	(Bulgaria) Anton Ognyanov vs CSKA Sofia	Dunav	(Bulgaria) Martin Lukov vs CSKA Sofia	Dunav
7	(Bulgaria) Dimitar Pirgov vs Pirin Blagoevgrad	Levski Sofia	(Bulgaria) Blagoy Makendzhiev vs Dunav	Beroe
8	(Bulgaria) Ventsislav Hristov vs Lokomotiv Plovdiv	Neftohimic	(Bulgaria) Martin Lukov vs Botev Plovdiv	Dunav
9	(Bulgaria) Ivan Minchev vs Vereya	Slavia	(Serbia) Bojan Jorgačević vs Dunav	Levski Sofia
10	(Bulgaria) Todor Nedelev vs Beroe	Botev Plovdiv	(Bulgaria) Nikolay Bankov vs Lokomotiv Plovdiv	Lokomotiv Gorna Oryahovitsa
11	(Spain) Añete vs Beroe	Levski Sofia	(Bulgaria) Hristo Ivanov vs CSKA Sofia	Montana
12	(Bulgaria) Atanas Zehirov vs Montana	Beroe	(Serbia) Bojan Jorgačević vs Botev Plovdiv	Levski Sofia
13	(Ghana) Carlos Ohene vs Lokomotiv Plovdiv	Beroe	(Bulgaria) Blagoy Makendzhiev vs Lokomotiv Plovdiv	Beroe
14	(Bulgaria) Dimitar Pirgov vs Montana	Levski Sofia	(Bulgaria) Krasimir Kostov vs Cherno More	Pirin Blagoevgrad
15	(Brazil) Gustavo Campanharo vs Botev Plovdiv	Ludogorets	(Morocco) Yassine El Kharroubi vs Levski Sofia	Lokomotiv Plovdiv
16	(Bulgaria) Stanislav Kostov vs Dunav	Pirin Blagoevgrad	(Serbia) Bojan Jorgačević vs Ludogorets	Levski Sofia
17	(Morocco) Mehdi Bourabia vs Slavia	Levski Sofia	(Morocco) Yassine El Kharroubi vs Cherno More	Lokomotiv Plovdiv
18	(Spain) Añete vs Vereya	Levski Sofia	(Bulgaria) Nikolay Bankov vs CSKA Sofia	Lokomotiv Gorna Oryahovitsa
19	(Bulgaria) Vladislav Uzunov vs Beroe	Lokomotiv Gorna Oryahovitsa	(Bulgaria) Martin Lukov vs CSKA Sofia	Dunav
20	(Bulgaria) Anton Karachanakov vs Dunav	Beroe	(Bulgaria) Ivan Čvorović vs Lokomotiv Gorna Oryahovitsa	Botev Plovdiv
21	(Bulgaria) Ivan Minchev vs Cherno More	Slavia		
22	(Bulgaria) Marcelinho vs Neftohimic	Ludogorets	(Bulgaria) Yanko Georgiev vs Ludogorets	Neftochimic
23	(Czech Republic) David Jablonský vs CSKA Sofia	Levski Sofia	(Bulgaria) Nikolay Krastev vs CSKA Sofia	Levski Sofia
24	(Bulgaria) Martin Raynov vs Levski Sofia	Beroe	(Slovakia) Dušan Perniš vs Levski Sofia	Beroe
25	(Bulgaria) Bircent Karagaren vs Ludogorets	Dunav	(Bulgaria) Stanislav Antonov vs Ludogorets	Dunav
26	(Brazil) Fernando Viana vs Montana	Botev Plovdiv	(Bulgaria) Yanko Georgiev vs Pirin Blagoevgrad	Neftochimic
27	(Spain) Añete vs Lokomotiv Plovdiv	Levski Sofia	(Bulgaria) Stanislav Antonov vs Ludogorets	Dunav
28	(Bulgaria) Miroslav Budinov vs Cherno More	Dunav	(Bulgaria) Yanko Georgiev vs Lokomotiv Gorna Oryahovitsa	Neftohimic
29	(France) Omar Kossoko vs Slavia	Botev Plovdiv	(Bulgaria) Stanislav Antonov vs Levski Sofia	Dunav
30	(Brazil) Fernando Karanga vs Levski Sofia	CSKA Sofia	(Bulgaria) Georgi Kitanov vs Levski Sofia	CSKA Sofia
31	(Bulgaria) Stanislav Kostov vs Beroe	Pirin Blagoevgrad	(Bulgaria) Stanislav Antonov vs CSKA Sofia	Dunav
32	(Morocco) Mehdi Bourabia vs Lokomotiv Plovdiv	Levski Sofia	(Bulgaria) Stefano Kunchev vs Pirin Blagoevgrad	Lokomotiv Gorna Oryahovitsa
33	(Bulgaria) Ivan Tsvetkov vs Vereya	Pirin Blagoevgrad		
34	(Bulgaria) Nikolay Minkov vs Lokomotiv Plovdiv	Cherno More	(Bulgaria) Stanislav Antonov vs Levski Sofia	Dunav
35	(Bulgaria) Samir Ayass vs Lokomotiv Plovdiv	Dunav		
36	(Slovakia) Roman Procházka vs Cherno More	Levski Sofia		

=== Top scorers ===
As of matches played on 31 May 2017

Rank	Player	Club	Goals
1	(Romania) Claudiu Keșerü	Ludogorets Razgrad	22
2	(Bulgaria) Martin Kamburov	Lokomotiv Plovdiv	17
3	(Bulgaria) Marcelinho	Ludogorets Razgrad	14
4	(Brazil) João Paulo (Note: Including 12 goals for Botev Plovdiv.)	Ludogorets Razgrad	13
4	(Brazil) Wanderson	Ludogorets Razgrad	13
6	(Bulgaria) Todor Nedelev	Botev Plovdiv	11
6	(Bulgaria) Daniel Mladenov	Pirin Blagoevgrad	11
6	(Democratic Republic of the Congo) Junior Mapuku	Beroe	11
9	(Brazil) Jonathan Cafu	Ludogorets Razgrad	10
9	(Bulgaria) Stanislav Kostov	Pirin Blagoevgrad	10
9	(Slovakia) Marek Kuzma	Cherno More	10
9	(Bulgaria) Miroslav Budinov	Dunav Ruse	10
9	(Russia) Serder Serderov	Slavia Sofia	10
9	(Bulgaria) Bozhidar Kraev	Levski Sofia	10
15	(Bulgaria) Ivaylo Dimitrov	Slavia Sofia	9
16	(France) Rahavi Kifouéti	Lokomotiv GO	8
16	(Slovakia) Roman Procházka	Levski Sofia	8
18	(Nigeria) Tunde Adeniji	Levski Sofia	7
18	(Bulgaria) Steven Petkov	Montana	7
18	(Colombia) Gustavo Culma	CSKA Sofia	7
18	(Bulgaria) Branimir Kostadinov	Dunav Ruse	7
18	(Slovenia) Dino Martinović	Lokomotiv Plovdiv	7

=== Hat-tricks ===
Player	For	Against	Result	Date
(Brazil) João Paulo	Botev Plovdiv	Lokomotiv GO	4–0	17 September 2016
(Democratic Republic of the Congo) Junior Mapuku	Beroe	Botev Plovdiv	3–4	16 October 2016
(Romania) Claudiu Keșerü	Ludogorets Razgrad	Dunav Ruse	5–3	28 October 2016
(Romania) Claudiu Keșerü	Ludogorets Razgrad	Lokomotiv GO	5–0	12 March 2017
(Bulgaria) Bozhidar Kraev^{4}	Levski Sofia	Lokomotiv Plovdiv	5–0	9 April 2017

Note

^{4} Player scored 4 goals

== Clean sheets ==
As of matches played on 31 May 2017

Rank	Player	Club	Clean sheets
1	(Bulgaria) Georgi Kitanov	CSKA Sofia	18
2	(Serbia) Bojan Jorgačević	Levski Sofia	12
3	(Bulgaria) Martin Lukov	Dunav Ruse	10
4	(Bulgaria) Blagoy Makendzhiev (Note: Including 5 clean sheets for Beroe.)	Pirin Blagoevgrad	9
4	(Bulgaria) Plamen Kolev	Vereya	9
6	(Bulgaria) Vladislav Stoyanov	Ludogorets Razgrad	8
6	(Bulgaria) Yanko Georgiev	Neftochimic	8
8	(Morocco) Yassine El Kharroubi	Lokomotiv Plovdiv	7
9	(Czech Republic) Přemysl Kovář	Cherno More	5
9	(Slovakia) Dušan Perniš	Beroe	5
9	(Bulgaria) Nikolay Krastev	Levski Sofia	5
12	(Bulgaria) Ivan Karadzhov	Vereya	4
12	(Bulgaria) Nikolay Bankov	Lokomotiv GO	4
12	(Bulgaria) Ivan Čvorović	Botev Plovdiv	4
12	(Brazil) Renan	Ludogorets Razgrad	4
12	(Bulgaria) Stanislav Antonov	Dunav Ruse	4

== Transfers ==
- List of Bulgarian football transfers summer 2016
- List of Bulgarian football transfers winter 2016–17

== Attendances ==
#	Club	Average	Highest
1	CSKA Sofia	4,217	21,000
2	Dunav	3,261	12,200
3	Levski	3,255	18,000
4	Ludogorets	2,045	5,800
5	Botev	1,906	7,300
6	Lokomotiv Plovdiv	1,534	4,600
7	Lokomotiv GO	1,440	8,000
8	Beroe	1,351	4,800
9	Pirin	1,192	4,800
10	Cherno More	821	2,600
11	Neftochimik	742	2,300
12	Vereya	556	3,500
13	Slavia Sofia	303	2,700
14	Montana	227	1,200
