= Stoychev =

Stoychev (Bulgarian: Стойчев) is a Bulgarian surname.

- Borislav Stoychev (born 1986), Bulgarian footballer
- Bozhidar Stoychev (born 1991), Bulgarian footballer
- Georgi Stoychev (born 1977), Bulgarian footballer
- Petar Stoychev (born 1976), Bulgarian swimmer
- Radostin Stoychev (born 1969), volleyball player and coach
- Stayko Stoychev (born 1989), Bulgarian footballer
- Trendafil Stoychev (born 1953), Bulgarian weightlifter
- Vladimir Stoychev (1892–1990), Bulgarian general, diplomats and equestrian
