= FC Partizan Cherven Bryag =

Bulgarian football club

Partizan
- Full name: Football Club Partizan Cherven Bryag
- Founded: 1918; 108 years ago
- Ground: Gradski Stadium
- Capacity: 1500
- Chairman: Angel Stoyanov
- Manager: Ivaylo Petkov-Gary
- League: North-West Third League
- 2020–21: North-West Third League, 7th
| Home colours | Away colours |

Football Club Partizan Cherven Bryag (Bulgarian: Футболен клуб Партизан Червен бряг) is a Bulgarian association football club based in Cherven Bryag, and plays in the North-West Third League, the third level of Bulgarian football.

Partizan was founded in 1918 as Football Club Sila. Cherven Bryag won promotion to the B PFG during the 1981–82 season, the only time the club has played in the second level of Bulgarian football. This proved to be the club's only season in professional football to date, as they finished on 16th place and were relegated after losing in the play-off against Metalurg Pernik.

The club had been playing mostly in the country's fourth division before it was promoted to the V AFG for the 2011–12 season, finishing 8th. They did even better during the 2012-13 campaign, finishing in 3rd spot.

== Stadium ==
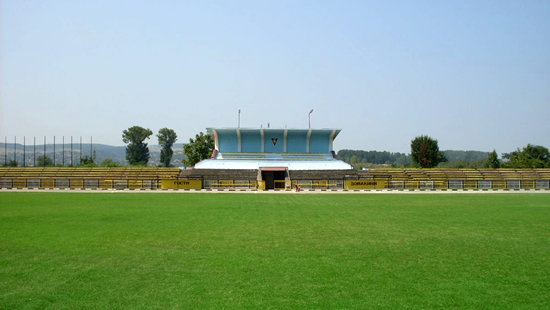
Stadium in Cherven Bryag

The club stadium is the 1500-seat Gradski Stadium in Cherven Bryag.

== Current squad ==
As of 1 August 2020 Note: Flags indicate national team as defined under FIFA eligibility rules; some limited exceptions apply. Players may hold more than one non-FIFA nationality.

| No. | Pos. | Nation | Player |
|---|---|---|---|
| 86 | GK | BUL | Dimitar Ivanov |
| 2 | DF | BUL | Stefan Stefanov |
| 3 | DF | BUL | Slavi Paskalev |
| 4 | DF | BUL | Stefan Stefanov |
| 6 | MF | BUL | Martin Eftimov |
| 7 | DF | BUL | Kaloyan Todorov |
| 8 | MF | BUL | Dimitar Dimitrov |
| 9 | MF | BUL | Kaloyan Angelov |
| 10 | FW | BUL | Kristiyan Tafradzhiyski |
| 11 | MF | BUL | Lyubomir Ivanov |
| 12 | GK | BUL | Veselin Ganchev |
| 13 | MF | BUL | Mitko Milchev |

| No. | Pos. | Nation | Player |
|---|---|---|---|
| 14 | MF | BUL | Hristo Dimov |
| 15 | MF | BUL | Angel Rusev |
| 16 | DF | BUL | Galin Velikov (captain) |
| 17 | MF | BUL | Aleksandar Aleksandrov |
| 18 | GK | BUL | Stanislav Antonov |
| 19 | MF | BUL | Ivaylo Minkov |
| 20 | DF | BUL | Tihomir Damyanov |
| 21 | FW | BUL | Aliosha Iliev |
| 22 | FW | BUL | Aleksandar Penev |
| 23 | DF | BUL | Petyo Petkov |
| 66 | MF | BUL | Milen Tonev |
