= Rahavi Kifouéti =

Congolese footballer (born 1989)

Personal information
- Full name: Rahavi Minimbou Kifouéti
- Date of birth: 12 March 1989 (age 37)
- Place of birth: Issy-les-Moulineaux, France
- Height: 1.82 m (6 ft 0 in)
- Positions: Winger; forward

Youth career
- 2005–2008: Auxerre

Senior career*
Years	Team	Apps	(Gls)
2007–2008	Auxerre	1	(0)
2009	ES Wasquehal		
2009–2011	Le Havre	2	(0)
2009–2011	Le Havre II	54	(12)
2011–2013	Vendée Poiré-sur-Vie	56	(7)
2013–2014	USJA Carquefou	5	(0)
2014–2015	Luçon	23	(4)
2015–2016	Botev Plovdiv	20	(0)
2016–2017	Lokomotiv GO	27	(8)
2017–2018	Doxa Katokopias	18	(1)
2018	Elazigspor	0	(0)
2018–2019	Bastia	13	(1)

International career
2017	Congo	2	(0)
- * Club domestic league appearances and goals

Rahavi Minimbou Kifouéti (born 12 March 1989) is a former professional footballer who played as a forward or winger. Born in France, he represented Congo at international level.

== Club career ==
=== Early career ===
Kifouéti was born in Issy-les-Moulineaux, Hauts-de-Seine (suburban Paris). He began his career in 2005 with Auxerre. After six months without a club, following his release from Auxerre in July 2008, he signed a contract with ES Wasquehal on 12 December 2008. Afterwards, he had short spells with Le Havre, Vendeé Poiré-sur-Vie, USJA Carquefou and Luçon.

=== Botev Plovdiv ===
After a successful trial, Kifouéti signed a contract with Botev Plovdiv on 11 September 2015. During the trial, he scored twice in a friendly game against Lokomotiv Gorna Oryahovitsa.

Kifouéti made an official debut for Botev Plovdiv on 12 September, but he was unable to prevent a 2–0 home loss from Litex Lovech.

On 23 September 2015, Kifouéti scored his first goal for Botev Plovdiv during a 4–0 away win over Septemvri Simitli in a game for the Bulgarian Cup. In October, Kifouéti provided the assists for the winning goals against PFC Montana and Pirin Blagoevgrad.

In the spring of 2016, Kifouéti failed to impress. After taking part in 22 official games and scoring one goal, he was released from the club at the end of the season.

=== Lokomotiv GO ===
Kifouéti spent the next season at newly promoted Lokomotiv Gorna Oryahovitsa, but left the club in June 2017 when his contract expired.

=== Doxa Katokopias ===
On 11 July 2017, Kifouéti signed with Cypriot club Doxa Katokopias.

=== Elazigspor ===
On 14 August 2018, he signed for Turkish club Elazigspor.

=== Bastia ===
On 12 October 2018, he signed a one-year contract with SC Bastia, and was released in July.

== International career ==
Kifouéti made his debut for the Congo national team in a 5–1 2018 FIFA World Cup qualification loss with Ghana on 5 September 2017.
