= Georgi Filipov =

Bulgarian footballer

Personal information
- Full name: Georgi Georgiev Filipov
- Date of birth: 12 August 1985 (age 41)
- Place of birth: Varna, Bulgaria
- Height: 1.81 m (5 ft 11 in)
- Positions: Winger; second striker

Senior career*
Years	Team	Apps	(Gls)
2003–2007	Spartak Varna	63	(7)
2007	Pierikos	0	(0)
2008–2010	Chernomorets Balchik	28	(4)
2010–2012	Kaliakra Kavarna	25	(2)
2012–2013	Spartak Varna	15	(0)
Total		131	(13)
- * Club domestic league appearances and goals

Georgi Filipov (Bulgarian: Георги Филипов; born 12 August 1985 in Varna) is a former Bulgarian footballer who played as a midfielder. He retired in 2013, at the age of 28, due to injury.

== Career ==
Filipov started his career in Spartak Varna's youth and made his debut for the club's first team at the age of 19 on 14 February 2004 in a 3–0 defeat to Belasitsa Petrich. He scored his first goal during the next 2004–05 season on 13 November 2004 in a 3–2 home win against Vidima-Rakovski.

Georgi left Spartak in June 2007, joining Greek side Pierikos, however, the coach could not find a place in his squad for the winger, and he was allowed to join Chernomorets Balchik at the end of the season.

In June 2010, Filipov signed a two-year contract with newly promoted A PFG side Kaliakra Kavarna. On 31 July he scored Kaliakra's first ever A PFG goal, in the 1–0 win over Slavia Sofia on the opening day of the 2010–11 season at the Ovcha Kupel Stadium. He scored his second league goal on 13 November 2010 as Kaliakra defeated Sliven 2000 1–0. One month later Filipov scored his third goal for Kaliakra in the third round of the 2010–11 Bulgarian Cup, a 3–1 defeat to Pirin Blagoevgrad at Hristo Botev Stadium.

On 22 October 2011 Filipov broke his leg in a match against Levski Sofia. Manager Radostin Trifonov later said he expected Filipov to be absent for a minimum of six months.

== Club statistics ==
Club	Season	League		Cup		Europe		Total	
Club	Season	Apps	Goals	Apps	Goals	Apps	Goals	Apps	Goals
Spartak Varna	2003–04	2	0	0	0	–	–	2	0
Spartak Varna	2004–05	19	1	1	0	–	–	20	1
Spartak Varna	2005–06	19	3	1	0	–	–	20	3
Spartak Varna	2006–07	23	3	1	0	–	–	24	3
Pierikos	2007–08	0	0	0	0	–	–	0	0
Chernomorets Balchik	2008–09	9	3	0	0	–	–	9	3
Chernomorets Balchik	2009–10	19	1	2	1	–	–	21	2
Kaliakra Kavarna	2010–11	19	2	2	1	–	–	21	3
Kaliakra Kavarna	2011–12	6	0	0	0	–	–	6	0
Spartak Varna	2012–13	15	0	1	0	–	–	16	0
Career totals		131	13	8	2	0	0	139	15
