= Miguelito (footballer, born 1981) =

Portuguese footballer

Personal information
- Full name: José Miguel Organista Simões Aguiar
- Date of birth: 4 February 1981 (age 45)
- Place of birth: Póvoa de Varzim, Portugal
- Height: 1.74 m (5 ft 9 in)
- Position: Wing-back

Youth career
- 1991–1999: Rio Ave

Senior career*
Years	Team	Apps	(Gls)
1999–2005	Rio Ave	146	(6)
2005–2006	Nacional	34	(1)
2006–2008	Benfica	7	(0)
2008	→ Braga (loan)	10	(0)
2008–2011	Marítimo	30	(0)
2010	→ Belenenses (loan)	12	(2)
2010–2011	→ Vitória Setúbal (loan)	29	(0)
2011–2012	Vitória Setúbal	27	(1)
2012–2013	Apollon Limassol	19	(0)
2013–2014	Moreirense	5	(1)
2014–2015	Chaves	13	(0)
2015–2016	Tirsense	10	(1)
Total		342	(12)

International career
2001–2002	Portugal U20	13	(3)
2002–2004	Portugal U21	5	(0)
- * Club domestic league appearances and goals

José Miguel Organista Simões Aguiar (born 4 February 1981), known as Miguelito, is a Portuguese former footballer. A speedy player, he could operate as a defender or midfielder on the left side of the pitch.

He amassed Primeira Liga totals of 220 games and seven goals over the course of ten seasons, representing in the competition Rio Ave, Nacional, Benfica, Braga, Marítimo, Belenenses and Vitória de Setúbal. He also competed professionally in Cyprus, in a 17-year career.

== Club career ==
Born in Póvoa de Varzim, Miguelito joined neighbouring Rio Ave FC's youth system at the age of 10. He broke into the first team eight years later, contributing 26 games in the 2002–03 campaign as the club returned to the Primeira Liga after a three-year absence, as champions.

Transferred to Madeira's C.D. Nacional on 2 June 2005, Miguelito had an impressive first season, not missing one match as the Madeira side qualified for the UEFA Cup (notably scoring against his former team in a 2–0 away win). He was bought by S.L. Benfica on 22 August 2006, having previously been voted the league's best winger by newspaper Record.

Midway through 2007–08, after having managed just three appearances in the Taça da Liga, barred by former Brazilian international Léo, Miguelito joined S.C. Braga in January, on loan. In August, he was released by Benfica and signed a three-year contract with C.S. Marítimo, which had just qualified for the UEFA Cup.

After a good first season, Miguelito fell out of favour and was inclusively demoted to the reserves. In late January 2010, he moved on loan to C.F. Os Belenenses.

== Personal life ==
Miguelito's younger brother, Sérgio Organista, was also a footballer. A youth product of FC Porto, he went on to represent, among others, Pontevedra CF.

== Honours ==
Rio Ave

- Segunda Liga: 2002–03

Moreirense

- Segunda Liga: 2013–14
