= Petar Petrov (footballer, born 1988) =

Bulgarian footballer

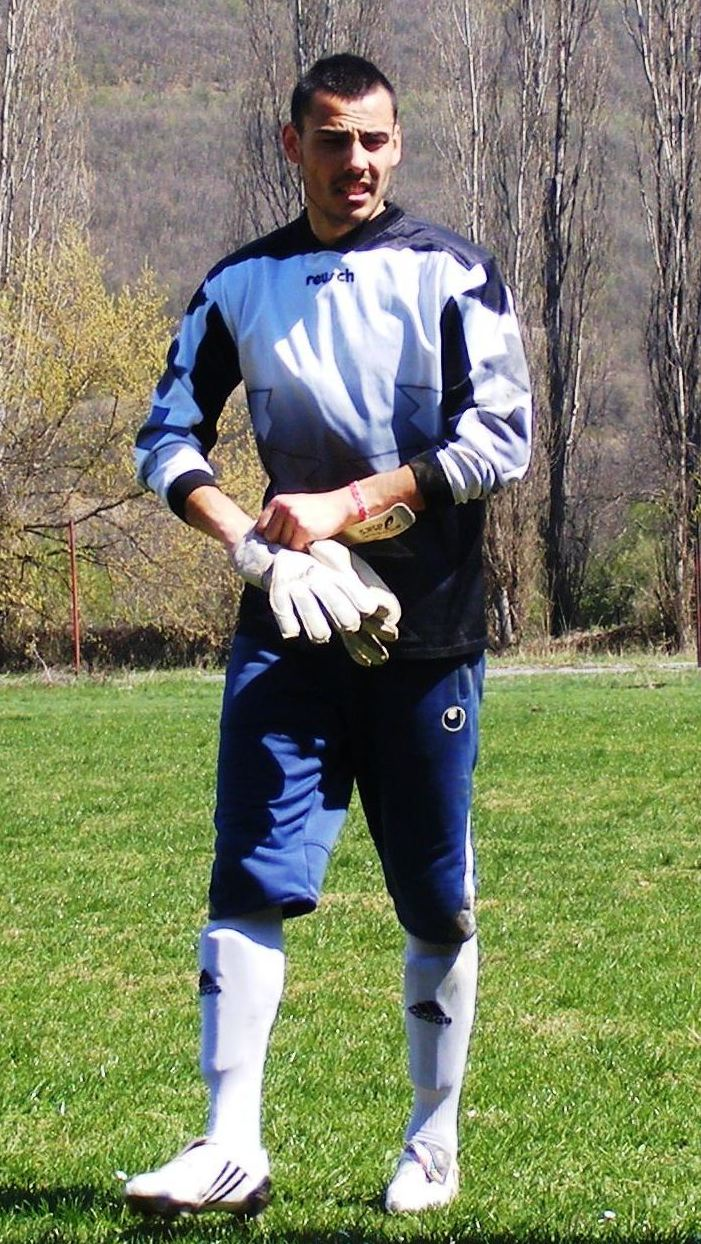
- Petrov in 2011

Personal information
- Full name: Petar Krasimirov Petrov
- Date of birth: 9 March 1988 (age 38)
- Place of birth: Montana, Bulgaria
- Height: 1.85 m (6 ft 1 in)
- Position: Goalkeeper

Team information
- Current team: FC Rheineck
- Number: 1

Youth career
- 1999–2006: Montana

Senior career*
Years	Team	Apps	(Gls)
2008–2009	Lencho Yakimovo	46	(0)
2010	Kom-Minyor	7	(0)
2011	Shurdanitsa Georgi Damyanovo	10	(0)
2012	Devnya	5	(0)
2013	Botev Brestak	5	(0)
2013	Vihar 23 Nikolovo	4	(0)
2014–2016	Kariana	51	(0)
2016–2017	Varshets 2012	8	(0)
2017	Kariana	0	(0)
2018–	FC Rheineck	31	(0)
- * Club domestic league appearances and goals as of 1. May 2022

Petar Krasimirov Petrov (Bulgarian: Петър Красимиров Петров; born 9 March 1988) is a Bulgarian footballer who plays as a goalkeeper for FC Rheineck in the Swiss 3. Liga.

== Career ==
Petrov started playing football in his hometown club Montana and spent his youth there, but never played for the senior team.

His professional career began at Kom-Minyor after signing with the club in January 2010. As a third choice goalkeeper he managed to start in the last three league matches of the 2009–10 season and in another five in the following 2010–11. He made his debut in a league game against Pirin Gotse Delchev on 1 May 2010 without conceding a goal and securing the 2–0 win which helped the team to avoid relegation.

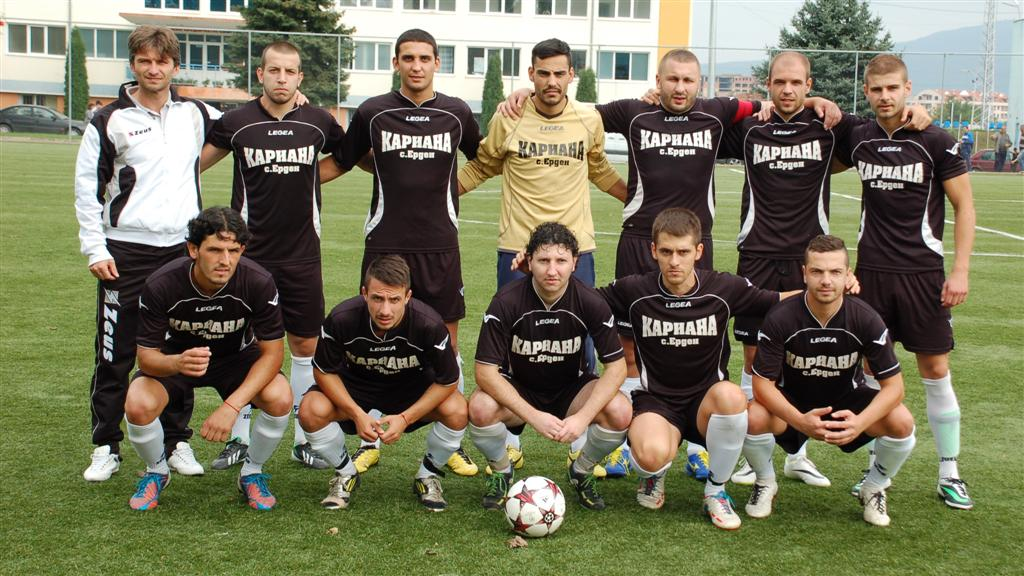
Kariana's starting eleven in an AFL Cup match against Kom Berkovitsa

Petrov started playing for Kariana in the spring 2013–14 season and since he is a regular choice. In Kariana's first participation in the AFL Cup Petrov helped the team reach the North-west final, while in the First stage he saved a penalty in a 2:1 win over Kom Berkovitsa and completing a clean sheet and saving two penalties securing a win over Manastirishte 2000.

After a short spell with Varshets 2012, in July 2017 Petrov returned to Kariana.

In November 2018 Petrov moved to Switzerland and joined the 3. Liga(Group 2) leaders FC Rheineck. By the end of the season the club won promotion to 2. Liga finishing first as group champions.

== Career statistics ==
As of 1. May 2022.

Club	Season	League	League		Cup		League Cup		Total	
Club	Season	League	Apps	Goals	Apps	Goals	Apps	Goals	Apps	Goals
Lencho Yakimovo	2007-08	A OFG (Montana)	11	0	-		-		11	0
Lencho Yakimovo	2008-09	A OFG (Montana)	21	0	-		-		21	0
Lencho Yakimovo	2009-10	A OFG (Montana)	14	0	-		-		14	0
Lencho Yakimovo	Total		46	0	-		-		46	0
Kom-Minyor	2009-10	B PFG (West)	3	0	0	0	-		3	0
Kom-Minyor	2010-11	B PFG (West)	4	0	1	0	-		5	0
Kom-Minyor	Total		7	0	1	0	-		8	0
Shurdanitsa	2010-11	A OFG (Montana)	10	0	-		-		10	0
Devnya	2012–13	V AFG (North-East)	5	0	-		-		5	0
Botev Brestak	2012–13	A OFG (Varna – North)	5	0	-		-		5	0
Vihar 23 (Nikolovo)	2013–14	A OFG (Montana)	4	0	-		-		4	0
Kariana Erden	2013–14	A OFG (Montana)	11	0	-		-		11	0
Kariana Erden	2014–15	A OFG (Montana)	21	0	2	0	4	0	27	0
Kariana Erden	2015–16	V AFG (North-West)	19	0	0	0	1	0	20	0
Kariana Erden	Total		51	0	3	0	6	0	60	0
Varshets 2012	2016–17	A OFG (Montana)	8	0	-		-		8	0
Kariana Erden	2017–18	Third League (North-West)	0	0	1	0	1	0	2	0
FC Rheineck	2018–19	3. Liga	3	0	-	-	1	0	4	0
FC Rheineck	2019–20	2. Liga	4	0	-	-	1	0	5	0
FC Rheineck	2020–21	2. Liga	9	0	-	-	1	0	10	0
FC Rheineck	2021–22	3. Liga	15	0	-	-	1	0	16	0
FC Rheineck	Total		31	0	-	-	4	0	35	0
Career total			167	0	5	0	11	0	183	0

== Honours ==
=== Club ===
Kariana Erden

- A OFG Montana: 2013–14, 2014–15
