= Stanislav Antonov =

Bulgarian footballer

Stanislav Georgiev Antonov
Personal information
- Date of birth: 21 March 1986 (age 40)
- Place of birth: Pleven, Bulgaria
- Height: 1.78 m (5 ft 10 in)
- Position: Goalkeeper

Team information
- Current team: Partizan Cherven Bryag
- Number: 1

Senior career*
Years	Team	Apps	(Gls)
2006–2008	Spartak Pleven	?	(?)
2009–2010	Dunav Ruse	13	(0)
2011	Bdin Vidin	13	(1)
2012–2015	Spartak Pleven	20	(0)
2015–2019	Dunav Ruse	53	(0)
2019–2020	Spartak Pleven	19	(0)
2020–2023	Partizan Cherven Bryag	?	(?)
2023–2025	Spartak Pleven	29	(0)
2025–	Partizan Cherven Bryag	?	(?)
- * Club domestic league appearances and goals as of 29 February 2024

Stanislav Antonov (Bulgarian: Станислав Антонов; born 21 March 1986) is a Bulgarian footballer who plays as a goalkeeper for FC Partizan Cherven Bryag
