= FC Malesh Mikrevo =

Bulgarian football club

Malesh
- Full name: FC Malesh Mikrevo
- Founded: 1936; 89 years ago
- Ground: Municipal Stadium, Mikrevo
- Capacity: 3,000
- Chairman: (Bulgaria) Valentin Chilikov
- Manager: (Bulgaria) Plamen Mitsanski
- League: A RFG Blagoevgrad
- 2021–22: A RFG Blagoevgrad, 6th
Home colours	Away colours

FC Malesh Mikrevo is a Bulgarian association football club based in the village of Mikrevo, Blagoevgrad Province, which currently competes in the A RFG Blagoevgrad, the fourth tier of the Bulgarian football league system.

The club was established in 1936. The biggest success in the club's history came in 2010, when the team earned promotion to the Bulgarian B PFG by decisively winning the South-West V AFG. The club's home ground is the Municipal Stadium in Mikrevo, which has a capacity for 3,000 spectators.

In December 2011, Vihren Sandanski obtained the license of Malesh. Malesh was subsequently demoted to playing in A RFG Blagoevgrad since the 2012–13 season.

== Honours ==
- South-West V AFG
  - Champions 2009-10
- Amateur Football League Cup
  - Winners 2006-07
