= Viktor Georgiev =

Bulgarian footballer

Personal information
- Full name: Viktor Yordanov Georgiev
- Date of birth: 28 October 1973 (age 52)
- Place of birth: Lovech, Bulgaria
- Height: 1.84 m (6 ft 0 in)
- Position: Goalkeeper

Youth career
- Litex Lovech

Senior career*
Years	Team	Apps	(Gls)
1995–1996	Litex Lovech		
1997–2000	Minyor Pernik	33	(0)
2000–2002	Slavia Sofia	34	(0)
2002–2004	Pirin Blagoevgrad		
2005–2006	Dunav Ruse	11	(0)
2006	Velbazhd Kyustendil	0	(0)
2007	Dunav Ruse	12	(0)
2007–2008	Akademik Sofia	5	(0)
2008–2010	Montana	32	(0)
2011	Nesebar	6	(0)
2012	Akademik Sofia	3	(0)
- * Club domestic league appearances and goals

Viktor Georgiev (Bulgarian: Виктор Георгиев; born 28 October 1973) is a retired Bulgarian footballer who played as a goalkeeper.
