= Stayko Stoychev =

Bulgarian footballer

Personal information
- Full name: Stayko Antonov Stoychev
- Date of birth: 30 August 1989 (age 37)
- Place of birth: Chirpan, Bulgaria
- Height: 1.78 m (5 ft 10 in)
- Position: Midfielder

Team information
- Current team: KS Opatówek
- Number: 10

Youth career
- FK Svetkavitsa Cirpan

Senior career*
Years	Team	Apps	(Gls)
2007–2010	Lokomotiv Plovdiv	22	(0)
2010	Brestnik 1948	8	(1)
2010	Chavdar Byala Slatina	3	(0)
2010–2011	Minyor Pernik	7	(0)
2011	Sliven 2000	10	(1)
2011	→ Chirpan (loan)	8	(0)
2012–2014	Calisia Kalisz	36	(2)
2013	→ KS Opatówek (loan)		
2014–2018	KKS 1925 Kalisz		
2018–2019	KS Opatówek	35	(8)
2019–2022	Victoria Skarszew	73	(14)
2023–2024	Orzeł Kawęczyn	41	(8)
2024–	KS Opatówek	48	(9)
- * Club domestic league appearances and goals as of 08:15, 23 June 2026 (UTC)

Stayko Stoychev (Bulgarian: Стайко Стойчев) (born 30 August 1989) is a Bulgarian footballer who plays as a midfielder for Polish club KS Opatówek.

== Career ==
Stoychev was raised in Lokomotiv Plovdiv's youth teams and made his competitive debut as a substitute for Lokomotiv in a 5–0 win over Beroe Stara Zagora on 1 April 2007. He played than in the following years for PFC Brestnik 1948, PFC Chavdar Byala Slatina, Kom-Minyor, FK Chirpan and Sliven 2000. On 16 January 2012, he left Bulgaria and signed with Polish II liga club Calisia Kalisz. In May 2012, he suffered a leg fracture, which kept him out of play for over six months. In March 2013, he joined IV liga club KS Opatówek on loan until the end of the season.

== Honours ==
Victoria Skarszew

- Regional league Greater Poland I: 2019–20

KS Opatówek

- Klasa A Greater Poland IX: 2024–25
