= Kristiyan Tafradzhiyski =

Bulgarian footballer

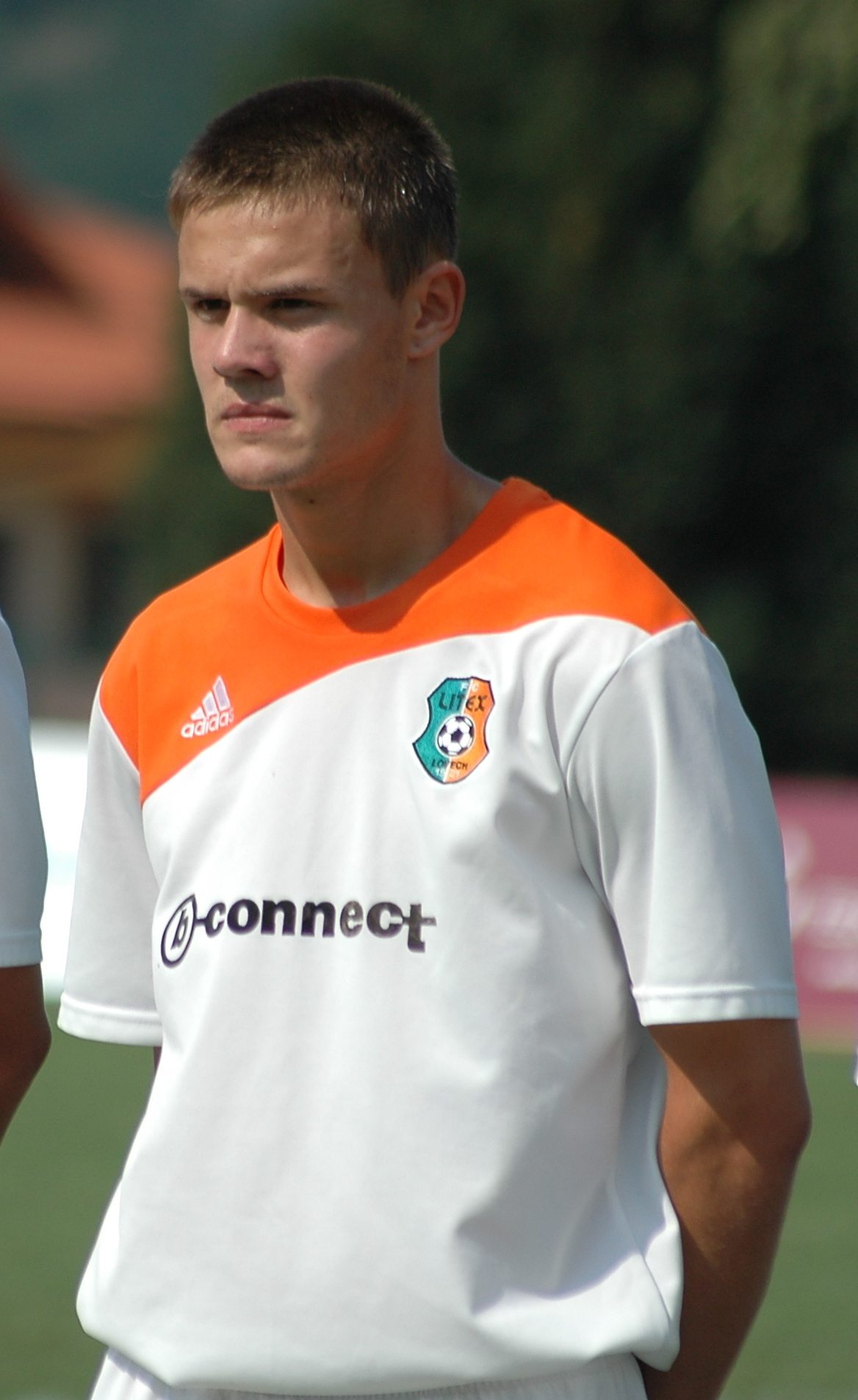

Personal information
- Full name: Kristiyan Ivanov Tafradzhiyski
- Date of birth: 10 August 1993 (age 33)
- Place of birth: Knezha, Bulgaria
- Height: 1.80 m (5 ft 11 in)
- Positions: Winger; forward

Youth career
- 2006–2011: Litex Lovech

Senior career*
Years	Team	Apps	(Gls)
2010–2016	Litex Lovech	0	(0)
2012	→ Vidima-Rakovski (loan)	14	(2)
2012–2015	→ Akademik Svishtov (loan)	73	(31)
2016	→ Sozopol (loan)	10	(1)
2016–2017	Sozopol	42	(7)
2018–2019	Litex Lovech	38	(8)
- * Club domestic league appearances and goals as of 1 June 2019

Kristiyan Tafradzhiyski (Bulgarian: Кристиян Тафраджийски; born 10 August 1993) is a Bulgarian footballer who plays as a forward.

== Career ==
Born in Knezha, Tafradzhiyski joined the Litex Lovech Academy at the age of thirteen in 2006. His first association with the first team came in October 2010, when he was featured as an unused substitute in a league game against Slavia Sofia.

In January 2012, Tafradzhiyski was loaned out to fellow A Group club Vidima-Rakovski. He made his competitive debut on 3 March in a 3–0 away league loss against Litex. On 28 March, he scored his first goal in a 3–2 away loss against Kaliakra Kavarna.

In June 2012, Tafradzhiyski joined Akademik Svishtov on loan, where he spent three and a half seasons. In his first campaign with Akademik he scored 7 goals in the third division, helping the team gain promotion to the B Group. In the following season, Tafradzhiyski played 18 games for the club in the second division, scoring three goals, but Akademik were relegated at the end of the season. In the 2014–15 season, he finished as Akademik's top league goalscorer with 11 goals.

On 16 January 2016, Tafradzhiyski was loaned out to Sozopol for the rest of the season.
