= Aleksandar Dimitrov =

Bulgarian footballer and manager

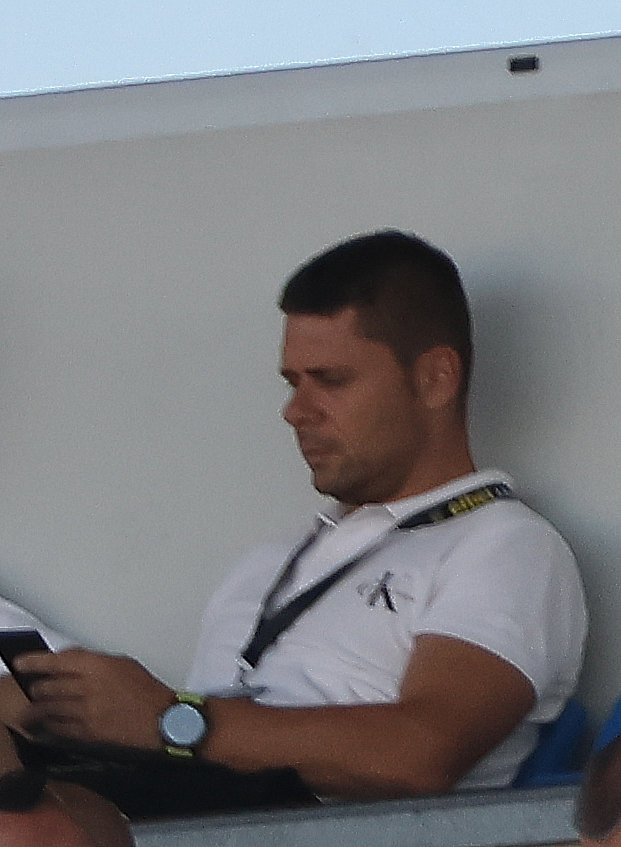

Personal information
- Full name: Aleksandar Kirilov Dimitrov
- Date of birth: 12 September 1976 (age 50)
- Place of birth: Sofia, Bulgaria
- Position: Midfielder

Youth career
- 1982–1995: CSKA Sofia

Senior career*
Years	Team	Apps	(Gls)
1995–2000	Yantra Gabrovo		
2000–2002	Belasitsa Petrich		
2002	Persija Jakarta		
2003–2004	Petrokimia Putra		
2005	Akademik Sofia		

Managerial career
- 2006–2007: Persipura Jayapura (assistant)
- 2007: Indonesia (assistant)
- 2008–2009: Conegliano German
- 2009: Vitosha Bistritsa
- 2010–2012: Bulgaria U17
- 2012: Botev Plovdiv (assistant)
- 2013–2014: Bulgaria U19 (assistant)
- 2014–2015: Bulgaria U17
- 2016: Beroe Stara Zagora
- 2017: Lokomotiv Gorna Oryahovitsa
- 2018–2025: Bulgaria U21
- 2025–2026: Bulgaria
- * Club domestic league appearances and goals

Aleksandar Dimitrov (Bulgarian: Александър Димитров; born 12 September 1976) is a Bulgarian professional football manager and former player who played as a midfielder. He was most recently the manager of the Bulgaria national team.

== Managerial career ==
Dimitrov served as manager of Beroe Stara Zagora; he resigned on 17 October 2016. On 14 March 2017, he was appointed as manager of Lokomotiv Gorna Oryahovitsa.

On 20 December 2018, Dimitrov was named the coach of Bulgaria's U21 side. Under his management the team went close to qualifying for the 2021 UEFA European Under-21 Championship, but eventually missed out. In December 2020, it was revealed by the Bulgarian Football Union that Dimitrov's contract will not be extended. However, in early 2021 he was appointed once again to the same position as manager of the team. In September 2025, Dimitrov became the manager of the senior national team on a two-year contract.

== Managerial statistics ==
As of 29 September 2026

Team	From	To	Record							
Team	From	To	G	W	D	L	Win %	GF	GA	GD
Bulgaria U17	1 September 2011	31 December 2012	10	4	2	4	40.00	13	10	+3
Bulgaria U19	1 July 2013	30 June 2014	11	5	3	3	45.45	17	11	+6
(Bulgaria) Beroe	1 July 2016	17 October 2016	13	5	2	6	38.46	11	15	-4
(Bulgaria) Lokomotiv Gorna Oryahovitsa	14 March 2017	30 June 2018	41	12	14	15	29.27	56	61	-5
Bulgaria U21	20 December 2018	24 September 2025	54	19	15	20	35.19	67	60	+7
Bulgaria	24 September 2025	29 September 2026	10	3	2	5	30.00	17	20	-3
Total			139	48	38	53	34.53	181	177	+4
