= Mihail Avrionov =

Bulgarian footballer

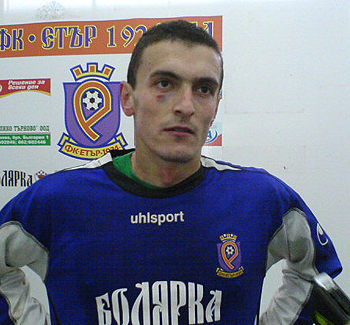

Personal information
- Full name: Mihail Kirilov Avrionov
- Date of birth: 27 June 1980 (age 46)
- Place of birth: Sofia, Bulgaria
- Height: 1.83 m (6 ft 0 in)
- Position: Forward

Senior career*
Years	Team	Apps	(Gls)
1999–2003	Asenovets	–	(–)
2003–2005	Levski Karlovo	–	(–)
2005–2006	Yantra Gabrovo	7	(4)
2006–2008	Etar 1924	49	(23)
2008–2010	Spartak Varna	22	(3)
2009	→ Etar 1924 (loan)	14	(6)
2010	Etar 1924	14	(5)
2011–2013	Asenovets	–	(–)
- * Club domestic league appearances and goals

Mihail Avrionov (born 27 June 1980) is a former Bulgarian footballer who played as a forward.

== Career ==
Avrionov started to play football on the junior teams of Levski Sofia. At the age of 18, he moved to FC Asenovets from Asenovgrad and played four years for this club in the Bulgarian amateur division. Avrionov then played two seasons in the amateur team Levski Karlovo. During the 2005–06 season, he made his official debut in professional football with FC Yantra.

During the 2007–08 season, Avrionov was the top scorer of Etar Veliko Tarnovo in the Bulgarian second division with 14 goals. He was also recognized as Etar's player of the season. In August 2008, the forward was transferred to Spartak Varna. He has been given the number 99 shirt.
