= Sérgio Organista =

Portuguese footballer

Personal information
- Full name: Sérgio José Organista Aguiar
- Date of birth: 26 August 1984 (age 42)
- Place of birth: Vila do Conde, Portugal
- Height: 1.83 m (6 ft 0 in)
- Position: Midfielder

Youth career
- 1993–1996: Rio Ave
- 1996–2002: Porto

Senior career*
Years	Team	Apps	(Gls)
2002–2006	Porto B	50	(6)
2004–2005	→ Santa Clara (loan)	20	(0)
2005–2006	→ Pontevedra (loan)	30	(0)
2006–2009	Pontevedra	38	(1)
2008–2009	→ Belenenses (loan)	7	(0)
2009–2010	OFI	13	(2)
2011	CSKA Sofia	0	(0)
2011	→ Akademik Sofia (loan)	9	(0)
2011–2012	Portimonense	15	(2)
2012–2013	Penafiel	31	(8)
2013–2014	Chaves	25	(1)
2014–2018	Varzim	57	(6)
Total		295	(26)

International career
2003–2004	Portugal U20	11	(2)
2005–2007	Portugal U21	12	(0)
- * Club domestic league appearances and goals

Sérgio José Organista Aguiar (born 26 August 1984), known as Organista, is a Portuguese former professional footballer who played as a midfielder.

== Club career ==
Organista was born in Vila do Conde. A product of FC Porto's youth academy, he would never appear officially for its main squad, spending two years with the reserve team and being loaned to C.D. Santa Clara in the 2004–05 season (Segunda Liga).

Subsequently, Organista spent three years with Pontevedra CF in the Spanish Segunda División B, the first still on loan. In August 2008 he agreed on a loan return to Portugal with C.F. Os Belenenses, being very rarely played as the Lisbon-based club was eventually relegated from the Primeira Liga – later reinstated.

In the summer of 2009, Organista was released by Pontevedra and signed for OFI Crete F.C. in Greece's second division. After a brief spell in Bulgaria he resumed his career in his country's second tier, appearing for Portimonense SC, F.C. Penafiel, G.D. Chaves and Varzim SC.

== International career ==
Organista was part of the Portugal under-21 squad at the 2007 UEFA European Championship, but did not play any games. Two years earlier he appeared for the nation at the Toulon Tournament, scoring two penalty kicks in as many matches (both wins) in a final runner-up position.

== Personal life ==
Organista's older brother, Miguel, was also a footballer. Among others, he represented C.D. Nacional and S.L. Benfica.
