= Vladislav Yamukov =

Bulgarian footballer

Personal information
- Full name: Vladislav Ivanov Yamukov
- Date of birth: 22 March 1980 (age 46)
- Place of birth: Elhovo, Bulgaria
- Height: 1.72 m (5 ft 7 1/2 in)
- Position: Full back

Team information
- Current team: Zagorets Nova Zagora

Youth career
- Rozova Dolina

Senior career*
Years	Team	Apps	(Gls)
1999–2003	Rozova Dolina	?	(?)
2003–2005	Sokol Markovo	?	(?)
2005–2007	Haskovo	44	(8)
2007–2010	Sliven 2000	69	(9)
2011–2012	Beroe Stara Zagora	26	(1)
2013–2015	Svilengrad	?	(13)
2015–	Zagorets Nova Zagora	?	(3)
- * Club domestic league appearances and goals as of 1 February 2016

Vladislav Yamukov (Bulgarian Cyrillic: Владислав Ямуков; born 22 Мarch 1980) is a Bulgarian football defender, who currently plays for Zagorets Nova Zagora.
