= Georgi Nikolov (footballer, born 1983) =

Bulgarian footballer

Personal information
- Full name: Georgi Nikolov Nikolov
- Date of birth: 5 June 1983 (age 43)
- Place of birth: Sofia, Bulgaria
- Height: 1.89 m (6 ft 2 in)
- Position: Defender

Youth career
- 1993–2002: Septemvri Sofia

Senior career*
Years	Team	Apps	(Gls)
2003–2005	Beroe Stara Zagora	13	(0)
2005–2006	Marek Dupnitsa	30	(0)
2007–2008	Belasitsa Petrich	54	(1)
2009	Lokomotiv Sofia	3	(0)
2010	Marek Dupnitsa	11	(0)
2010–2011	Bansko	27	(0)
2011–2012	Bdin Vidin	10	(1)
2012	Marek Dupnitsa	?	(2)
2013	Vitosha Bistritsa	?	(0)
2013–2014	Marek Dupnitsa	7	(0)
- * Club domestic league appearances and goals as of 14 November 2013

Georgi Nikolov (Bulgarian: Георги Николов; born 5 June 1983 in Sofia) is a Bulgarian footballer who last played for Marek Dupnitsa as a defender.

== Career ==
Nikolov is 1.93 m tall and weighs 81 kg. He has previously played for Beroe Stara Zagora, Marek Dupnitsa, Belasitsa Petrich, and Lokomotiv Sofia. Nikolov was raised in Septemvri Sofia's youths teams.
