= Milen Lahchev =

Bulgarian footballer and coach

Personal information
- Full name: Milen Veselinov Lahchev
- Date of birth: 1 April 1987 (age 39)
- Place of birth: Dupnitsa, Bulgaria
- Height: 1.87 m (6 ft 2 in)
- Position: Centre-back

Youth career
- 1994–2004: Marek Dupnitsa

Senior career*
Years	Team	Apps	(Gls)
2004–2005	Marek Dupnitsa	0	(0)
2005–2010	Vidima-Rakovski	106	(9)
2010–2011	Lokomotiv Sofia	41	(1)
2012	Concordia Chiajna	2	(0)
2012–2013	Montana	14	(0)
2013–2016	Marek Dupnitsa	51	(2)
Total		214	(12)

International career
	Bulgaria U19	1	(0)
2007	Bulgaria U21	1	(0)

Managerial career
- 2017: Germanea
- * Club domestic league appearances and goals as of 7 September 2019

Milen Lahchev (Bulgarian: Милен Лахчев; born 1 April 1987) is a former Bulgarian footballer and a current coach.

== Career ==
Lahchev began his youth career at Germanea, but later moved to Marek Dupnitsa. His professional years were spent mainly at Vidima-Rakovski and Lokomotiv Sofia, for whom he played in the UEFA Europa League. Following brief stints at Montana and Romanian side Concordia, Lahchev returned to Marek in 2013, where he served as team captain.

In early 2017, without announcing that he is retiring as an active player, Lahchev, who holds a UEFA B Licence, left Marek to become head coach of Germanea.

== Honours ==
=== Player ===
Vidima-Rakovski

- Second League (1): 2009–10

Marek Dupnitsa

- Second League (1): 2013–14
