= Stoyan Stefanov =

Bulgarian footballer

Personal information
- Full name: Stoyan Ivanov Stefanov
- Date of birth: 28 July 1983 (age 43)
- Place of birth: Sliven, Bulgaria
- Height: 1.76 m (5 ft 9 1/2 in)
- Position: Midfielder

Senior career*
Years	Team	Apps	(Gls)
2005–2008	Kastoria	10	(0)
2008–2009	Kaliakra Kavarna	24	(0)
2009–2010	Sliven 2000	15	(0)
2011	Costuleni	10	(0)
2011–2012	Minyor Pernik	4	(0)
- * Club domestic league appearances and goals

Stoyan Stefanov (Bulgarian: Стоян Стефанов; born 28 July 1983) is a Bulgarian former footballer who played as a midfielder.
