= Dilyan Kolev =

Bulgarian footballer

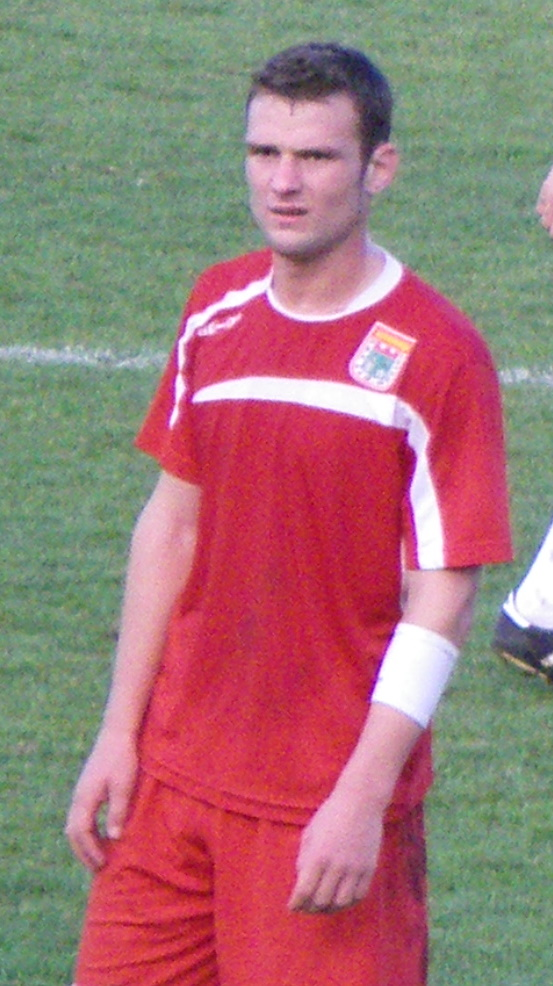

Personal information
- Full name: Dilyan Nikolaev Kolev
- Date of birth: 9 November 1988 (age 38)
- Place of birth: Byala, Bulgaria
- Height: 1.84 m (6 ft 0 in)
- Position: Midfielder

Team information
- Current team: Einherji
- Number: 17

Youth career
- 2002–2007: Litex Lovech

Senior career*
Years	Team	Apps	(Gls)
2007–2008	Lokomotiv Mezdra	0	(0)
2008	Benkovski Byala	13	(0)
2008–2010	Kom-Minyor	55	(5)
2011	Sliven 2000	13	(0)
2011	Chavdar BS	10	(0)
2012	Costuleni	12	(0)
2012–2013	Čelik Nikšić	25	(1)
2013	Lokomotiv Sofia	4	(0)
2014	Mladost Podgorica	11	(0)
2014	KF Fjallabyggd	9	(0)
2015	Einherji	17	(4)
2016	Leiknir Fáskrúðsfirði	2	(0)
2016–2023	Einherji	105	(15)

International career
2009	Bulgaria U21	3	(0)
- * Club domestic league appearances and goals as of 1 December 2017

Dilyan Kolev
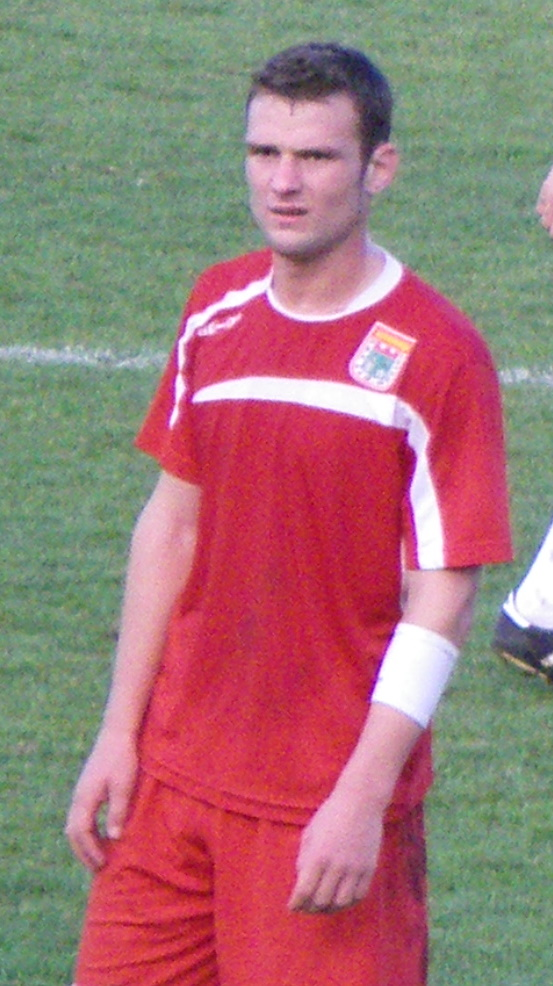

Personal information
- Nickname: "The Lizard"
- Born: 9 November 1988 (age 38)

Sport
- Sport: Darts
- Playing since: 2020
- Laterality: Right-handed
- Walk-on music: "Numb" by Linkin Park

Organisation (see split in darts)
- WDF: 2024–
- Current world ranking: (WDF) NR (17 August 2026)

Dilyan Nikolaev Kolev (Bulgarian: Дилян Николаев Колев; born 9 November 1988) is a Bulgarian professional darts player who currently plays in World Darts Federation (WDF) events. He is also a former footballer who played as a midfielder.

== Football career ==
Born in Byala, Rousse Province, Kolev underwent trials in the Litex Lovech youth academy after just two training sessions. His first coach was Yordan Yordanov. He progressed through all age groups at the academy, coached by specialists including Stefan Yarmov, Plamen Linkov, and Nikolay Dimitrov-Dzhaych. As a youth player, he won the Juliy Manzarov Cup in 2005. The same year, he also secured a bronze medal in the Bulgarian Football Union Cup (again with the 1987 cohort at Litex). In 2006, he was named "Best Youth Player" at the academy and was earmarked as the heir to the legendary Nebojša Jelenković.

Kolev's performances caught the attention of then-head coach Lyubko Petrovich. The promising talent began training with the first team, participating in 7-8 friendly matches, but never made an official debut for the senior squad. In July 2007, he was sent on a trial at PFC Lokomotiv Mezdra and later signed a professional contract. Despite a strong preseason, he did not get a chance to play, and during the winter break, he was loaned to Benkovski Byala. After the season ended, Mezdra did not offer him a long-term contract, and he signed with Kom-Minyor. His impressive displays attracted the attention of top Bulgarian clubs. In 2009, he was a member of the Bulgaria national under-21 football team.

In early February 2011, he signed a one-and-a-half-year contract with elite club OFC Sliven 2000, with his former club Berkovitsa entitled to receive 30% of his future transfer fee. He had a stint at Moldovan club Kostuleni, where his coach was Velizar Popov. Since 2012, he has been competing for Montenegrin club Cetinje Niksic. On October 22, 2012, he was named Player of the Round in the Montenegrin league. In the winter break of the 2011–12 season, he moved first time abroad, to play with Moldovan National Division side FC Costuleni. Then in the summer of 2012 he moved to Montenegro where he signed for FK Čelik Nikšić.

He ended his professional football career in July 2023.

== Darts career ==
In 2020, during the coronavirus pandemic, Kolev ventured into the sport of darts. Over the following years, he honed his skills in Iceland, where he participated in his first international tournament. In his debut year at the international level, he advanced to the final of the 2024 Faroe Islands Darts Open, where he faced Edwin Torbjörnsson and lost with a score of 3–5 legs in that final match. This marked a significant milestone in Kolev's darting career, showcasing his rapid progress.

In October 2024, he took part in the World Masters held in Budapest.
