= Angel Ginev =

Bulgarian footballer

Personal information
- Full name: Angel Ginev Ginev
- Date of birth: 24 December 1976 (age 49)
- Place of birth: Haskovo, Bulgaria
- Height: 1.88 m (6 ft 2 in)
- Position: Defender

Senior career*
Years	Team	Apps	(Gls)
2002–2004	Rodopa Smolyan		
2004–2006	Jaro	51	(0)
2007	Rodopa Smolyan	9	(0)
2007–2009	Lyubimets 2007	23	(1)
2009–2010	Dunav Rousse	23	(1)
2010–2011	Ludogorets Razgrad	14	(3)
- * Club domestic league appearances and goals as of 30 December 2010

Angel Ginev Ginev (Bulgarian: Ангел Гинев Гинев; born 24 December 1976) is a former Bulgarian footballer.

Ginev played for FF Jaro in Finnish premier division and for Rodopa Smolyan in the Bulgarian first division. Ginev played as a central defender. He retired in 2011.
