= Miroslav Todorov =

Bulgarian footballer (born 1985)

Personal information
- Full name: Miroslav Todorov Todorov
- Date of birth: 26 June 1985 (age 41)
- Place of birth: Bulgaria
- Height: 1.80 m (5 ft 11 in)
- Position: Midfielder

Team information
- Current team: Botev Ihtiman

Senior career*
Years	Team	Apps	(Gls)
2006–2008	Rodopa Smolyan	51	(5)
2009	Botev Plovdiv	5	(0)
2009–2011	Pirin Blagoevgrad	11	(1)
2011–2012	Sportist Svoge	22	(7)
2012	Lyubimets 2007	1	(0)
2013–2014	Vitosha Bistritsa	5	(0)
2014–2015	Minyor Pernik	33	(7)
2015	Vitosha Bistritsa	17	(2)
2016	Minyor Pernik	17	(5)
2016	Tsarsko Selo	1	(0)
2017–	Botev Ihtiman	0	(0)
- * Club domestic league appearances and goals as of 11 February 2017

Miroslav Todorov (Bulgarian: Мирослав Тодоров; born 26 June 1985) is a Bulgarian footballer, who plays as a midfielder for Botev Ihtiman.

Todorov previously played for Rodopa Smolyan, Botev Plovdiv and Pirin Blagoevgrad in the A PFG.
