= Georgi Hashev =

Bulgarian footballer

Personal information
- Full name: Georgi Titev Hashev
- Date of birth: 26 March 1990 (age 36)
- Place of birth: Stara Zagora, Bulgaria
- Height: 1.86 m (6 ft 1 in)
- Position: Centre back

Youth career
- 2000–2008: Beroe Stara Zagora

Senior career*
Years	Team	Apps	(Gls)
2009–2012	Beroe Stara Zagora	1	(0)
2009–2010	→ Minyor Radnevo (loan)	13	(0)
2011–2012	→ Sliven 2000 (loan)	33	(1)
2012–2013	Neftochimic 1986	34	(3)
2014	Sozopol	14	(3)
2014	Korsholm	–	(–)
2015–2016	Sozopol	53	(0)
2017	Neftochimic Burgas	7	(0)
2017–2019	Tsarsko Selo	56	(4)
- * Club domestic league appearances and goals as of 15 December 2019

Georgi Hashev (Bulgarian: Георги Хашев; born 26 March 1990) is a Bulgarian professional footballer who plays as a defender.

== Career ==
On 25 January 2017, Hashev signed with Neftochimic but had to leave the club in June following the relegation to the Second League. On 25 June 2017, he joined Tsarsko Selo.

== Awards ==
- Champion of B PFG 2013 (with Neftochimic Burgas)
