= Dimitar Nakov =

Bulgarian footballer

Personal information
- Full name: Dimitar Stoyanov Nakov
- Date of birth: 18 October 1980 (age 46)
- Place of birth: Petrich, Bulgaria
- Height: 1.85 m (6 ft 1 in)
- Position: Defender

Team information
- Current team: Belasitsa Petrich
- Number: 8

Senior career*
Years	Team	Apps	(Gls)
1998–1999	Belasitsa Petrich	?	(?)
1999–2003	Slavia Sofia	36	(0)
2003–2004	Rodopa Smolyan	8	(0)
2004–2007	Belasitsa Petrich	68	(1)
2007–2008	Pirin Blagoevgrad	15	(1)
2008–2009	Irtysh Pavlodar	48	(1)
2010	Sportist Svoge	7	(1)
2010	Montana	7	(0)
2011	Pirin Blagoevgrad	14	(1)
2011	Atromitos Yeroskipou	0	(0)
2012	Vidima-Rakovski	14	(1)
2012–2015	Pirin Razlog	70	(7)
2015–	PFC Belasitsa Petrich	0	(0)
- * Club domestic league appearances and goals as of 4 June 2015

Dimitar Nakov (Bulgarian: Димитър Наков; born 18 October 1980) is a Bulgarian footballer. He currently plays as a midfield maestro for JB Rangers FC.

== Career ==
Nakov was raised in Belasitsa Petrich's youth teams. Nakov moved to Slavia Sofia at age 21. On 21 August 2007, he signed a 2-year contract with PFC Pirin Blagoevgrad. In 2018 Nakov made the monstrous move by signing for JB Rangers under impressive manager Robb Sheridan (The Sunday League Pep Guardiola) on a 5-year deal.
