= OFC Kom Berkovitsa =

Bulgarian football club

Kom
- Full name: Obshtinski Football Club Kom Berkovitsa
- Nickname: Komo
- Founded: 1957; 69 years ago
- Ground: Mramor Stadium, Berkovitsa
- Capacity: 3,000
- League: North-West Third League
- 2025–26: North-West Third League, 3rd
Home colours	Away colours

OFC Kom (Bulgarian: ОФК Ком) is a Bulgarian football club from the town of Berkovitsa, currently playing in the North-West Third League, the third level of Bulgarian football.

The club's home ground is the Mramor Stadium in Berkovitsa, with a capacity of 3,000. Team colours are white, red, black and yellow.

== Honours ==
- Cup of Bulgarian Amateur Football League
  - Winners: 2007–08
- Eleventh place in the Western "B" group: 2008/09
- 1/8 Finalist in the National Cup Tournament: at that time its official name was Cup of Bulgaria – 2010/11

== History ==
Football Club Kom was founded in 1957. In 1972 the club qualified for Bulgarian second division, but five years later were relegated in amateur division.

In summer 2007 FC Kom merged with another amateur club – FC Minyor 2002 Draganitsa. The new club was named Kom-Minyor and in his first season finished in third position in third division. Thus Kom-Minyor qualified for the Bulgarian second professional division for the second time in his history. In 2007–08 season the club won and the Cup of Amateur Football League. The team have since forfeited their place in the league for the 2010–11 season.

In March 2011, the team decided to cancel its participation in the Bulgarian B Professional Football Group due to financial difficulties and the club was administratively relegated to the amateur divisions. After a few days the club was dissolved.

In 2012 FC Kom was restored.

== Last squad ==
As of August 31, 2010

Note: Flags indicate national team as defined under FIFA eligibility rules; some limited exceptions apply. Players may hold more than one non-FIFA nationality.

No.	Pos.	Nation	Player
1	GK	BUL	Borislav Dragomirov
2	DF	BUL	Aleksandar Goranov
3	DF	BUL	Kostadin Boshikyov
4	MF	BUL	Emanuil Petrov
5	DF	BUL	Anton Vergilov
7	DF	BUL	Chavdar Dimitrov
8	MF	BUL	Yordan Todorov
9	FW	BUL	Blagovest Todorov
10	MF	BUL	Ilian Antonov
11	MF	BUL	Nikola Boychev
12	GK	BUL	Georgi Sholevski
13	DF	BUL	Galab Gerasimov
14	MF	BUL	Georgi Nedyalkov

No.	Pos.	Nation	Player
15	MF	BUL	Rosen Kolev
17	MF	BUL	Dilyan Kolev
19	DF	BUL	Milen Gotsov
22	MF	BUL	Vladimir Georgiev
24	DF	BUL	Kaloyan Zarchov
26	GK	BUL	Petar Petrov
77	MF	BUL	Dilyan Dimitrov
88	MF	BUL	Miroslav Marinov
90	MF	BUL	Svetoslav Kostov
99	GK	BUL	Slavi Petrov
