= List of Bulgarian football transfers summer 2017 =

This is a list of Bulgarian football transfers for the 2017 summer transfer window. Only transfers involving a team from the two professional leagues, First League and Second League are listed.

== First League ==
=== Beroe ===
In:

No.	Pos.	Nation	Player
3	DF	BUL	Milen Zhelev (from Lokomotiv GO)
5	DF	BUL	Pavel Vidanov (from Lokomotiv Plovdiv)
6	DF	BUL	Ivan Ivanov (from (Russia) Arsenal Tula)
9	FW	BUL	Martin Kamburov (from Lokomotiv Plovdiv)
11	MF	ROU	Dragoș Firțulescu (from (Romania) Pandurii)
13	DF	BUL	Emin Ahmed (loan return from Nesebar)
16	MF	SRB	Marko Adamović (from (Israel) Hapoel Ra'anana)
20	DF	BRA	Matheus Leoni (from (Switzerland) Neuchâtel Xamax)
21	FW	ROU	Sergiu Negruț (from (Romania) Pandurii)
22	GK	BUL	Bogomil Tsintsarski (loan return from Minyor Radnevo)
26	DF	BUL	Kamen Hadzhiev (from (Netherlands) Fortuna Sittard)
77	MF	POR	Pedro Eugénio (from Vereya)
—	DF	BUL	Aleksandar Hardalov (from Zagorets)

Out:

No.	Pos.	Nation	Player
5	DF	BUL	Asen Georgiev (to Lokomotiv Plovdiv)
6	DF	BUL	Ivo Ivanov (to Vereya)
9	MF	BUL	Radoslav Kirilov (loan return to (Italy) Chievo)
10	FW	COD	Junior Mapuku (to Levski Sofia)
11	FW	FIN	Ville Salmikivi (to (Poland) Olimpia Grudziądz)
14	FW	BUL	Georgi Bozhilov (to Cherno More)
18	DF	BUL	Atanas Zehirov (to Cherno More)
19	MF	BUL	Ivelin Iliev (to Rozova Dolina, previously on loan at Botev Galabovo)
21	DF	BUL	Ventsislav Vasilev (to Etar)
24	FW	CRO	Mateas Delić (to (Italy) Bisceglie)
30	MF	BUL	Atanas Panov (to Vereya)
33	MF	BRA	Tom (to Lokomotiv Sofia)
91	MF	BUL	Erik Pochanski (to Etar)
—	DF	BUL	Aleksandar Hardalov (on loan to Botev Galabovo)
—	MF	BUL	Kiril Lichev (to Neftochimic, previously on loan at Oborishte)

=== Botev Plovdiv ===
In:

No.	Pos.	Nation	Player
6	MF	BRA	Álvaro (from (Brazil) Olímpia)
11	MF	BUL	Toni Tasev (from Pirin Blagoevgrad)
20	FW	BUL	Steven Petkov (from Montana)
22	GK	POL	Daniel Kajzer (from (Poland) ROW Rybnik)
23	DF	BUL	Yordan Minev (from Ludogorets)
29	MF	FRA	Daudet N'Dongala (from (Turkey) Şanlıurfaspor)
93	FW	BRA	Gustavo Sauer (from (United Arab Emirates) Al-Shaab)

Out:

No.	Pos.	Nation	Player
3	DF	BUL	Atanas Tasholov (on loan to Maritsa Plovdiv)
4	DF	BUL	Viktor Genev (to (Israel) Ashdod)
13	FW	BUL	Ismet Ramadan (to (Germany) TSV Rothwesten)
15	FW	BUL	Ivan Kirev (on loan to Bansko)
19	FW	BUL	Boris Tyutyukov (to Pomorie)
20	FW	FRA	Omar Kossoko (to (United Arab Emirates) Al-Fujairah)
21	GK	BUL	Martin Dimitrov (on loan to Nesebar)
22	GK	BUL	Georgi Georgiev (to (Moldova) Dacia Chișinău)
23	MF	BUL	Petar Chalakov (on loan to Maritsa Plovdiv)
39	MF	BUL	Antonio Vutov (loan return to (Italy) Udinese)
77	MF	BUL	Milko Georgiev (on loan to Chernomorets Balchik)
—	DF	BUL	Georgi Kupenov (on loan to Nesebar, previously on loan at Septemvri Sofia)
—	FW	BUL	Emil Kamberov (released)

=== Cherno More ===
In:

No.	Pos.	Nation	Player
7	DF	POR	Vitinha (from Ludogorets)
9	FW	BUL	Tsvetelin Chunchukov (from Ludogorets)
11	FW	FRA	Amadou Soukouna (from Levski Sofia)
14	FW	BUL	Georgi Bozhilov (from Beroe)
15	DF	BUL	Aleksandar Aleksandrov (from Levski Sofia)
18	DF	BUL	Atanas Zehirov (from Beroe)
19	DF	BUL	Iliya Milanov (from Neftochimic)
22	MF	BUL	Mariyan Ognyanov (from Neftochimic)
23	DF	ALG	Ilias Hassani (from Vereya)
66	MF	BUL	Orlin Starokin (from Pirin Blagoevgrad)
77	GK	UKR	Yevhen Borovyk (from (Ukraine) Karpaty Lviv)
81	MF	BUL	Anton Ognyanov (from Levski Sofia)

Out:

No.	Pos.	Nation	Player
3	MF	BUL	Daniel Georgiev (to Septemvri Sofia)
4	DF	BUL	Mihail Venkov (to Slavia Sofia)
9	FW	GAM	Bacari (released)
10	MF	BUL	Ilian Iliev (to (Portugal) Académica de Coimbra U19)
13	MF	BUL	Ivan Kokonov (to Montana)
15	DF	BUL	Trayan Trayanov (to Septemvri Sofia)
22	DF	BUL	Plamen Nikolov (to Lokomotiv Plovdiv)
30	GK	CZE	Vojtěch Šrom (to (Czech Republic) Opava)
66	MF	CZE	Filip Hlúpik (to (Finland) Mariehamn)
70	MF	BUL	Borislav Baldzhiyski (to Montana)
77	MF	ESP	Pirulo (released)
84	MF	BUL	Todor Palankov (to Pirin Blagoevgrad)
98	FW	BUL	Valentin Yoskov (on loan to Nesebar)

=== CSKA Sofia ===
In:

No.	Pos.	Nation	Player
6	MF	POR	Rúben Pinto (from (Portugal) Belenenses, previously on loan)
16	MF	CMR	Raoul Loé (from (Spain) Osasuna)
17	MF	BRA	Henrique (on loan from (Brazil) Atlético Mineiro)
20	MF	POR	Tiago Rodrigues (from (Portugal) Porto)
25	DF	FRA	Alexandre Barthe (from (Romania) Universitatea Craiova)
30	GK	LTU	Vytautas Černiauskas (from (Romania) Dinamo București)

Out:

No.	Pos.	Nation	Player
5	DF	COL	Rafa Pérez (to (Colombia) Atlético Junior)
10	MF	POR	Arsénio (to (Portugal) Moreirense)
16	MF	BUL	Krasimir Stanoev (to Dunav Ruse)
17	MF	POR	David Simão (to (Portugal) Boavista)
20	MF	CMR	Petrus Boumal (to (Russia) Ural Yekaterinburg)
21	MF	POR	Rui Pedro (to (Hungary) Ferencváros)
22	MF	BUL	Nikola Kolev (on loan to Etar)
24	MF	BUL	Rumen Rumenov (to Etar)
25	FW	BUL	Tonislav Yordanov (on loan to Litex)
28	DF	BUL	Plamen Galabov (on loan to Etar)
30	GK	BUL	Aleksandar Konov (to Dunav Ruse)

=== Dunav ===
In:

No.	Pos.	Nation	Player
8	MF	BRA	Jatoba (from (Brazil) J. Malucelli)
14	MF	BUL	Bozhidar Vasev (from (Israel) Hapoel Acre)
17	MF	BUL	Andreas Vasev (from Montana)
20	FW	BUL	Dimitar Georgiev (from Lokomotiv Sofia)
24	DF	BUL	Preslav Petrov (from Ludogorets Razgrad II)
31	MF	BUL	Krasimir Stanoev (from CSKA Sofia)
33	GK	BUL	Aleksandar Konov (from CSKA Sofia)
83	DF	BUL	Hristo Popadiyn (from Vitosha Bistritsa)

Out:

No.	Pos.	Nation	Player
3	DF	BUL	Mario Petkov (on loan to Tsarsko Selo)
6	MF	LBN	Samir Ayass (to (Lebanon) Al-Ahed)
8	MF	BUL	Ivaylo Radentsov (to Litex)
28	DF	BUL	Atanas Atanasov (end of contract)
32	MF	BUL	Stefan Mitev (on loan to Lokomotiv Ruse)
66	DF	TJK	Iskandar Dzhalilov (to (Russia) Baltika Kaliningrad)
91	MF	TJK	Nuriddin Davronov (to (Tajikistan) Istiklol, previously on loan)
99	FW	ALB	Ndue Mujeci (to (Georgia (country)) Saburtalo)

=== Etar ===
In:

No.	Pos.	Nation	Player
1	GK	BUL	Hristo Ivanov (from Oborishte)
5	MF	BUL	Georgi Sarmov (from (Moldova) Dacia Chișinău)
7	MF	BUL	Ivan Valchanov (from Septemvri Sofia)
8	MF	BUL	Rumen Rumenov (from CSKA Sofia)
14	DF	BUL	Veselin Minev (from Levski Sofia)
16	DF	BUL	Plamen Galabov (on loan from CSKA Sofia)
20	MF	BUL	Yani Pehlivanov (from Neftochimic)
21	DF	BUL	Ventsislav Vasilev (from Beroe)
22	MF	BUL	Nikola Kolev (on loan from CSKA Sofia)
25	DF	BUL	Sasho Aleksandrov (from Levski Sofia)
89	FW	SEN	Alioune Badará (from (Portugal) Amarante)
92	MF	BUL	Erik Pochanski (from Beroe)
—	MF	BUL	Martin Stankev (from Slavia Sofia)

Out:

No.	Pos.	Nation	Player
1	GK	BUL	Ivaylo Petkov (released)
2	DF	BUL	Martin Nikolov (to Lokomotiv GO)
3	DF	BUL	Georgi Kremenliev (to Arda Kardzhali)
4	DF	BUL	Denislav Mitsakov (to Strumska Slava)
5	DF	BUL	Mihail Minkov (to Litex Lovech)
8	MF	BUL	Stanislav Genchev (retired)
11	MF	BUL	Stefan Nedelchev (on loan to Botev Galabovo)
16	DF	BUL	Galin Tashev (loan return to Levski Sofia)
18	MF	BUL	Iliyan Trifonov (released)
23	MF	BUL	Yavor Genchev (to Sevlievo)
25	MF	BUL	Mitko Plahov (to Arda Kardzhali)
99	FW	BUL	Tihomir Kanev (to Litex Lovech)
—	MF	BUL	Martin Stankev (to Lokomotiv Sofia)

=== Levski Sofia ===
In:

No.	Pos.	Nation	Player
4	DF	BUL	Ivan Goranov (from Lokomotiv Plovdiv)
5	DF	ISL	Hólmar Örn Eyjólfsson (on loan from (Israel) Maccabi Haifa)
8	MF	BUL	Antonio Vutov (on loan from (Italy) Udinese)
9	FW	ROU	Sergiu Buș (from (Romania) Astra Giurgiu)
10	FW	COD	Junior Mapuku (from Beroe)
11	MF	FRA	Anthony Belmonte (from (France) Limonest)
13	MF	ESP	Jordi Gómez (from (Spain) Rayo Vallecano)
14	DF	BUL	Miki Orachev (loan return from Lokomotiv Sofia)
19	DF	SRB	Miloš Cvetković (from (Serbia) Napredak Kruševac)
24	GK	BUL	Aleksandar Lyubenov (from Lokomotiv Plovdiv)
25	MF	BUL	Georgi Angelov (from Vereya)
26	MF	NED	Jerson Cabral (from (France) Bastia)
30	MF	ROU	Neluț Roșu (from (Romania) Viitorul Constanța)
32	MF	FRA	Gabriel Obertan (from (England) Wigan)
71	MF	BUL	Vasil Panayotov (from (Poland) Stal Mielec)

Out:

No.	Pos.	Nation	Player
2	DF	ROU	Srdjan Luchin (to (Romania) CFR Cluj)
5	DF	BUL	Aleksandar Aleksandrov (to Cherno More)
8	MF	CUW	Jeremy de Nooijer (to (Moldova) Sheriff Tiraspol)
12	MF	BUL	Bozhidar Kraev (to (Denmark) Midtjylland)
14	DF	BUL	Veselin Minev (to Etar)
18	MF	BUL	Anton Ognyanov (to Cherno More)
20	FW	ESP	Añete (to (Greece) Apollon Smyrnis)
25	DF	BUL	Sasho Aleksandrov (to Etar)
26	FW	FRA	Amadou Soukouna (to Cherno More)
27	MF	FRA	Mehdi Bourabia (to (Turkey) Konyaspor)
29	GK	SRB	Bojan Jorgačević (retired)
39	DF	BUL	Deyan Ivanov (on loan to Botev Vratsa)
70	MF	BUL	Georgi Kostadinov (to (Israel) Maccabi Haifa)
88	MF	BUL	Georgi Yanev (on loan to Strumska Slava, previously on loan at Spartak Pleven)
89	GK	BUL	Nikolay Krastev (on loan to Botev Vratsa)
93	MF	BUL	Atanas Kabov (on loan to Botev Vratsa)
—	DF	BUL	Galin Tashev (on loan to Lokomotiv Sofia, previously on loan at Etar)

=== Lokomotiv Plovdiv ===
In:

No.	Pos.	Nation	Player
2	DF	CMR	Marc-Gauthier Bedimé (from (France) Belfort)
5	DF	BUL	Asen Georgiev (from Beroe)
6	DF	BUL	Georgi Pashov (from Slavia Sofia)
11	FW	TUN	Khaled Ayari (from (France) Orléans)
13	MF	BUL	Simeon Raykov (from (Netherlands) Roda)
22	DF	BUL	Plamen Nikolov (from Cherno More)
25	DF	NGA	Musa Muhammed (on loan from (Turkey) İstanbul Başakşehir)
29	MF	BUL	Yanko Angelov (from Septemvri Sofia)
34	MF	CRO	Igor Banović (from (Moldova) Milsami Orhei)
40	GK	FRA	Mory Diaw (from (Portugal) Mafra)
44	DF	BUL	Ivaylo Markov (loan return from Tsarsko Selo)
49	MF	MAR	Rayan Frikeche (from (France) Ajaccio)

Out:

No.	Pos.	Nation	Player
3	DF	BUL	Aleksandar Tunchev (retired)
4	MF	MKD	Stefan Jevtoski (to (Croatia) NK Varaždin)
5	DF	BUL	Pavel Vidanov (to Beroe)
6	DF	BUL	Kiril Kotev (to CSKA 1948)
11	FW	BUL	Martin Kamburov (to Beroe)
14	DF	BUL	Ivan Goranov (to Levski Sofia)
16	GK	MAR	Yassine El Kharroubi (to (Morocco) WAC)
23	MF	ESP	Miguel Luque (to (Andorra) Sant Julià)
24	DF	MKD	Robert Petrov (retired)
33	GK	BUL	Kristiyan Katsarev (to Lokomotiv GO)
37	MF	BUL	Eyad Hammoud (to (England) Sheffield Wednesday U18)
90	DF	BRA	Choco (to (Lithuania) Sūduva)
—	GK	BUL	Aleksandar Lyubenov (to Levski, previously on loan at Loko Sofia)
—	GK	BUL	Mario Raychev (to Rilski Sportist, previously on loan)
—	MF	BUL	Aykut Yanukov (released, previously on loan at Oborishte)
—	FW	BUL	Ivan Kolev (to Nesebar, previously on loan at Pomorie)

=== Ludogorets ===
In:

No.	Pos.	Nation	Player
1	GK	ARG	Jorge Broun (from (Argentina) Rosario Central)
2	DF	BRA	Rafael Forster (from (Ukraine) Zorya Luhansk)
5	DF	BUL	Georgi Terziev (loan return from (Croatia) Hajduk Split)
23	DF	BUL	Ventsislav Kerchev (loan return from Lokomotiv GO)
44	MF	POL	Jacek Góralski (from (Poland) Jagiellonia Białystok)

Out:

No.	Pos.	Nation	Player
5	DF	ARG	José Palomino (to (Italy) Atalanta)
16	DF	COL	Brayan Angulo (to (Mexico) Puebla, previously on loan at (Mexico) Chiapas)
17	FW	BUL	Tsvetelin Chunchukov (to Cherno More)
22	FW	BRA	Jonathan Cafu (to (France) Bordeaux)
25	DF	BUL	Yordan Minev (to Botev Plovdiv)
33	GK	BUL	Georgi Argilashki (to Vereya, previously on loan)
77	DF	POR	Vitinha (to Cherno More)
99	GK	CAN	Milan Borjan (to (Serbia) Red Star, previously on loan at (Poland) Korona Kielce)

=== Pirin Blagoevgrad ===
In:

No.	Pos.	Nation	Player
6	MF	BUL	Todor Palankov (from Cherno More)
7	MF	ALB	Andi Renja (from Levski Karlovo)
44	MF	IRL	Conor Henderson (from (England) Eastbourne Borough)
99	FW	BUL	Radoslav Kirilov (on loan from (Italy) Chievo)

Out:

No.	Pos.	Nation	Player
4	DF	SVK	Kristián Koštrna (to (Slovakia) DAC Dunajská Streda)
5	MF	BUL	Hristo Mladenov (on loan to Strumska Slava)
6	MF	BUL	Orlin Starokin (to Cherno More)
7	MF	BUL	Toni Tasev (to Botev Plovdiv)
8	FW	BUL	Ivan Tsvetkov (retired)
9	MF	ENG	Ross Jenkins (to (Norway) Viking)
12	GK	BUL	Veselin Ganev (to Arda Kardzhali)
20	FW	BUL	Kiril Grozdanov (on loan to Sozopol)
28	MF	BUL	Vasil Bozhinov (to Septemvri Simitli)
29	DF	BRA	Alexandre Hans (to (Portugal) Aves)

=== Septemvri Sofia ===
In:

No.	Pos.	Nation	Player
3	DF	AUT	Patrick Wessely (from (Austria) Admira Wacker)
4	DF	BUL	Trayan Trayanov (from Cherno More)
6	DF	FRA	Helton Dos Reis (Free agent)
7	MF	BUL	Ivan Tilev (loan return from Tsarsko Selo)
9	FW	BUL	Martin Toshev (from (Germany) Erzgebirge Aue)
11	MF	BUL	Vladislav Romanov (from Neftochimic)
13	FW	BUL	Vasil Kaloyanov (from Vereya)
16	MF	BRA	Jean Patric (from (Brazil) América-RN)
18	MF	BUL	Antoni Ivanov (from Montana)
19	FW	FRA	Chris Gadi (from Spartak Pleven)
21	GK	BUL	Yanko Georgiev (from Neftochimic)
23	DF	BUL	Rumen Trifonov (from (Poland) Miedź Legnica)
25	DF	BUL	Ivan Stoyanov (from Nesebar)
—	DF	BUL	Aleksandar Branekov (from Slavia Sofia)
—	MF	BUL	Daniel Georgiev (from Cherno More)
—	MF	BUL	Ivan Valchanov (from Neftochimic)

Out:

No.	Pos.	Nation	Player
3	DF	BUL	Georgi Kupenov (loan return to Botev Plovdiv)
7	MF	BUL	Nikolay Tsvetkov (to Lokomotiv Sofia)
8	MF	BUL	Yanko Angelov (to Lokomotiv Plovdiv)
10	FW	BUL	Radoslav Vasilev (to (Cyprus) Alki Oroklini)
11	FW	BUL	Daniel Pehlivanov (to Vihren Sandanski)
12	GK	BUL	Petar Debarliev (to Hebar Pazardzhik)
13	DF	BUL	Petar Vasilev (retired)
14	MF	BUL	Zdravko Dimitrov (on loan to Botev Vratsa)
15	MF	BUL	Petar Tonchev (to Oborishte)
16	MF	BUL	Ivan Tilev (on loan to Tsarsko Selo)
18	DF	BUL	Dimitar Ruychev (to Oborishte)
19	DF	BUL	Mariyan Dimitrov (on loan to Tsarsko Selo)
20	FW	BUL	Kostadin Adzhov (to Oborishte)
23	MF	BUL	Ivo Ivanov (to Lokomotiv Sofia)
30	MF	BUL	Aleksandar Bastunov (on loan to Nesebar)
—	DF	BUL	Aleksandar Branekov (to Lokomotiv Sofia)
—	MF	BUL	Daniel Georgiev (to Montana)
—	MF	BUL	Ivan Valchanov (to Etar)
—	MF	BUL	Zdravko Dimitrov (on loan to Lokomotiv Sofia, previously on loan at Botev Vratsa)

=== Slavia Sofia ===
In:

No.	Pos.	Nation	Player
2	DF	BUL	Dimitar Burov (loan return from Spartak Pleven)
4	DF	BUL	Mihail Venkov (from Cherno More)
5	MF	GAB	Ulysse Ndong (from Lokomotiv GO)
6	DF	BUL	Kostadin Velkov (from Neftochimic)
8	MF	BUL	Slavcho Shokolarov (from Ludogorets II)
11	MF	NGA	Chigozie Mbah (from (Slovakia) Žilina)
12	GK	ITA	Emanuele Geria (Free agent)
22	FW	MLI	Souleymane Traore (from (Morocco) Hassania Agadir)
23	MF	BUL	Vladislav Uzunov (from Lokomotiv GO)
24	DF	BRA	Matheus Bissi (from (Portugal) Tourizense)
33	MF	BUL	Galin Ivanov (from Neftochimic)
99	GK	BUL	Martin Velichkov (loan return from Strumska Slava)
—	DF	GRE	Theodoros Papoutsoyiannopoulos (from (Greece) Aiginiakos)

Out:

No.	Pos.	Nation	Player
2	DF	BUL	Dimitar Todorov (to Botev Vratsa)
6	DF	BUL	Aleksandar Branekov (to Septemvri Sofia)
8	MF	BUL	Bozhidar Vasev (to (Israel) Hapoel Acre)
9	FW	RUS	Serder Serderov (to (Russia) Yenisey)
10	MF	BUL	Yanis Karabelyov (on loan to Tsarsko Selo)
11	DF	BUL	Georgi Pashov (to Lokomotiv Plovdiv)
12	GK	BUL	Mario Kirev (to (Cyprus) Nea Salamina)
15	DF	BUL	Petko Hristov (to (Italy) Fiorentina)
18	DF	RUS	Daniil Maykov (released)
21	MF	BUL	Martin Stankev (to Etar)
22	MF	BUL	Vladimir Semerdzhiev (on loan to Lokomotiv Sofia)
33	FW	BUL	Kitan Vasilev (on loan to Vitosha Bistritsa)
—	DF	GRE	Theodoros Papoutsoyiannopoulos (to (Greece) Kalamata)

=== Vereya ===
In:

No.	Pos.	Nation	Player
6	DF	BUL	Ivo Ivanov (from Beroe)
9	FW	ALG	Mehdi Fennouche (from Lokomotiv GO)
14	MF	KAZ	Yerkebulan Nurgaliyev (from (Kazakhstan) Okzhetpes)
16	MF	BUL	Petar Vitanov (from CSKA Sofia II)
19	MF	BUL	Atanas Panov (from Beroe)
24	DF	KSA	Hussein Sulaimani (from (Saudi Arabia) Al-Nassr)
29	FW	BUL	Ismail Isa (from (Moldova) Dacia Chișinău)
77	MF	BUL	Milen Tanev (from Pomorie)
96	GK	BUL	Georgi Argilashki (from Ludogorets, previously on loan)
—	MF	ESP	David González Gutiérrez (from (Spain) Atlético Unión Güímar)

Out:

No.	Pos.	Nation	Player
2	DF	GHA	Samuel Inkoom (end of contract)
3	DF	BUL	Vladimir Zafirov (released)
6	DF	ALG	Ilias Hassani (to Cherno More)
7	MF	BUL	Momchil Tsvetanov (to (Poland) Stal Mielec)
25	MF	BUL	Georgi Angelov (to Levski Sofia)
32	FW	BUL	Vasil Kaloyanov (to Septemvri Sofia)
71	MF	BUL	Ivan Vinkov (to Botev Galabovo, previously on loan)
77	DF	POR	Pedro Eugénio (to Beroe)
86	DF	BUL	Ivan Bandalovski (to (Cyprus) Anorthosis)

=== Vitosha Bistritsa ===
In:

No.	Pos.	Nation	Player
1	GK	BUL	Mihail Ivanov (from (Italy) Robur Siena)
2	DF	BUL	Todor Gochev (from Botev Vratsa)
11	FW	BUL	Daniel Kutev (from (Greece) Nestos Chrysoupoli)
15	DF	BUL	Radko Mutafchiyski (from (Greece) Apollon Larissa)
30	DF	BUL	Iliyan Popov (from Levski Sofia U19)
45	FW	BUL	Grigor Dolapchiev (from Spartak Pleven)
77	MF	BUL	Daniel Peev (from Lokomotiv Sofia)
80	FW	BUL	Kitan Vasilev (on loan from Slavia Sofia)

Out:

No.	Pos.	Nation	Player
2	MF	BUL	Lachezar Kotev (on loan to Oborishte)
6	DF	BUL	Hristo Popadiyn (to Dunav Ruse)
21	MF	BUL	Ivan Georgiev (released)
23	MF	BUL	Emil Kolev (to Botev Galabovo)
30	DF	BUL	Mike Krastev (to Oborishte)

== Second League ==
=== Botev Galabovo ===
In:

No.	Pos.	Nation	Player
5	DF	BUL	Tsvetelin Radev (from Spartak Pleven)
6	MF	BUL	Antonio Georgiev (from Ludogorets Razgrad II)
11	MF	BUL	Iliyan Kapitanov (from Dobrudzha Dobrich)
15	FW	BUL	Ivan Tsachev (from Nesebar)
18	MF	BUL	Emil Kolev (from Vitosha Bistritsa)
28	MF	BUL	Kristiyan Georgiev (from Dobrudzha Dobrich)
31	GK	BUL	Marin Orlinov (from Spartak Pleven)
71	MF	BUL	Ivan Vinkov (from Vereya, previously on loan)
74	MF	BUL	Bogomil Hristov (from Lokomotiv Sofia)
77	MF	BUL	Stefan Nedelchev (on loan from Etar)
—	DF	BUL	Aleksandar Hardalov (on loan from Beroe)

Out:

No.	Pos.	Nation	Player
1	GK	BUL	Georgi Stavrev (to Vihren Sandanski)
5	DF	BUL	Beysim Beysim (to Arda Kardzhali)
6	MF	BUL	Steliyan Evtimov (to Minyor Radnevo)
7	MF	BUL	Georgi Valev (released)
11	MF	BUL	Doncho Atanasov (to Svilengrad)
17	MF	BUL	Valchan Chanev (to Arda Kardzhali)
23	MF	BUL	Dimitar Videv (to Vereya II)
28	MF	BUL	Ivan Tilev (to Levski Karlovo)
69	DF	BUL	Ivaylo Angelov (to (Italy) Latina)
74	MF	BUL	Denis Nikolov (to Minyor Pernik)
77	MF	BUL	Ivelin Iliev (loan return to Beroe)

=== Botev Vratsa ===
In:

No.	Pos.	Nation	Player
2	DF	BUL	Dimitar Todorov (from Slavia Sofia)
5	DF	BUL	Kristiyan Grigorov (from Ludogorets Razgrad II)
6	MF	BUL	Daniel Gadzhev (from Montana)
7	FW	BUL	Aleksandar Aleksandrov (from Slivnishki Geroy)
11	FW	BUL	Borislav Borisov (from Sozopol)
13	MF	BUL	Atanas Dimitrov (from Belasitsa Petrich)
14	DF	BUL	Petar Alyoshev (from Ludogorets Razgrad II)
16	DF	BUL	Atanas Fidanin (from Lokomotiv GO)
18	MF	BUL	Atanas Kabov (on loan from Levski Sofia)
33	GK	BUL	Nikolay Krastev (on loan from Levski Sofia)
39	DF	BUL	Deyan Ivanov (on loan from Levski Sofia)
—	GK	BUL	Ivaylo Vasilev (from Neftochimic)
—	MF	BUL	Zdravko Dimitrov (on loan from Septemvri Sofia)

Out:

No.	Pos.	Nation	Player
2	DF	BUL	Todor Gochev (to Vitosha Bistritsa)
3	DF	BUL	Mariyan Ivanov (to Lokomotiv GO)
5	DF	BUL	Minko Lastardzhiev (released)
7	FW	BUL	Hristo Spasov (to Spartak Pleven)
10	MF	BUL	Denis Tsolev (released)
11	MF	BUL	Pavel Golovodov (to Lokomotiv GO)
13	MF	ARM	Andrey Shakhkeldyan (released)
14	MF	BUL	Nikolay Marinov (released)
16	MF	BUL	Lyubomir Tanev (to Belasitsa Petrich)
20	MF	BUL	Andrian Kraev (to Hebar Pazardzhik)
23	GK	BUL	Ivaylo Yanachkov (to Lokomotiv Sofia)
27	GK	MDA	Nicolai Cebotari (to (Moldova) Sfântul Gheorghe)
39	DF	BUL	Ivan Penev (to Sozopol)
—	GK	BUL	Ivaylo Vasilev (to Montana)
—	MF	BUL	Zdravko Dimitrov (loan return to Septemvri Sofia)

=== Chernomorets Balchik ===
In:

No.	Pos.	Nation	Player
6	MF	BUL	Milko Georgiev (on loan from Botev Plovdiv)
8	MF	BUL	Ahmed Hikmet (from Hebar Pazardzhik)
13	DF	BUL	Raif Muradov (from Oborishte)
17	MF	TJK	Nozim Babadjanov (from (Tajikistan) Regar-TadAZ)
24	FW	BUL	Vladislav Mirchev (from (Malaysia) Perak TBG)
73	DF	BUL	Stefan Ivanov (from Dobrudzha Dobrich)

Out:

No.	Pos.	Nation	Player
8	MF	BUL	Nikola Arnaudov (to Suvorovo)

=== Litex ===
In:

No.	Pos.	Nation	Player
3	DF	BUL	Martin Simeonov (from CSKA Sofia II)
4	MF	BUL	Nikolay Hristov (from Lokomotiv GO)
6	DF	BUL	Mihail Minkov (from Etar)
7	MF	BUL	Hristo Kirev (from Bansko)
10	FW	BUL	Tonislav Yordanov (on loan from CSKA Sofia)
11	DF	BUL	Emil Petrov (from CSKA Sofia II)
13	GK	BUL	Petar Petrov (from CSKA Sofia II)
17	MF	BUL	Dobromir Bonev (from CSKA Sofia II)
18	MF	BUL	Ivaylo Radentsov (from Dunav Ruse)
22	DF	BUL	Angel Lyaskov (on loan from CSKA Sofia)
23	MF	BUL	Tihomir Todorov (from Spartak Pleven)
88	DF	BUL	Ivan Turitsov (on loan from CSKA Sofia II)
98	MF	BUL	Georgi Tartov (from CSKA Sofia II)
99	FW	BUL	Tihomir Kanev (from Etar)

Out:

No.	Pos.	Nation	Player
5	DF	BUL	Emil Grozev (to Botev Lukovit)
6	MF	BUL	Antoniy Balakov (to Lokomotiv GO)
7	DF	BUL	Aleksandar Kirilov (to (Iceland) Einherji)
10	MF	BUL	Denil Seliminski (to Botev Lukovit)
12	MF	BUL	Zhulien Benkov (released)
13	GK	BUL	Ventsislav Dimitrov (released)
19	FW	BUL	Georgi Kakalov (to Borislav)
21	FW	BUL	Preslav Antonov (released)
23	MF	BUL	Yoan Petkov (released)
24	MF	BUL	Radoslav Baychev (to Sevlievo)
70	DF	BUL	Ivan Filipov (released)
77	DF	BUL	Viktor Mitsakov (to Vihren Sandanski)
78	FW	BUL	Atanas Kurdov (to Lokomotiv Sofia)
88	MF	BUL	Ruslan Ivanov (to Bansko)
99	MF	BUL	Veselin Vasev (to CSKA 1948)

=== Lokomotiv GO ===
In:

No.	Pos.	Nation	Player
1	GK	BUL	Kristiyan Katsarev (from Lokomotiv Plovdiv)
2	DF	BUL	Martin Nikolov (from Etar)
6	MF	BUL	Petar Kazakov (from Dobrudzha Dobrich)
8	FW	BUL	Aleksandar Kirov (from (Austria) Andorf)
12	GK	BUL	Ivaylo Krusharski (Free agent)
13	MF	BUL	Veselin Lyubomirov (from Ludogorets Razgrad II)
14	DF	BUL	Ivaylo Todorov (from Lyubimets)
16	MF	BUL	Vladimir Michev (Free agent)
17	MF	BUL	Pavel Golovodov (from Botev Vratsa)
18	FW	BUL	Deyan Hristov (from Sozopol)
19	DF	BUL	Milen Savov (from Lyubimets)
20	MF	BUL	Yacub Idrizov (from Sozopol)
26	DF	BUL	Mariyan Ivanov (from Botev Vratsa)
27	MF	BUL	Georgi Chukalov (from Slavia Sofia U19)
28	MF	FRA	Kevin Osei (from Spartak Pleven)
66	MF	BUL	Antoniy Balakov (from Litex)
70	DF	BUL	Kristiyan Dimitrov (from Ludogorets Razgrad II)
93	FW	BUL	Dimitar Baydakov (from Lyubimets)
—	GK	BUL	Dimitar Nikolov (from Neftochimic)

Out:

No.	Pos.	Nation	Player
1	GK	BUL	Stefano Kunchev (to Vihren Sandanski)
4	MF	BUL	Nikolay Hristov (to Litex Lovech)
5	DF	BUL	Martin Kavdanski (to (France) Clermont)
6	DF	BUL	Atanas Fidanin (to Botev Vratsa)
7	MF	BUL	Simeon Mechev (released)
8	DF	BUL	Milen Zhelev (to Beroe)
9	FW	TUN	Sofien Moussa (to (Scotland) Dundee)
11	MF	BUL	Krasen Trifonov (to Pavlikeni)
14	MF	FRA	Rahavi Kifouéti (to (Cyprus) Doxa Katokopias)
15	DF	HAI	Jean Ambrose (released)
16	GK	BUL	Petar Denchev (released)
22	MF	FRA	Karl Madianga (released)
23	MF	BUL	Vladislav Uzunov (to Slavia Sofia)
24	MF	GAB	Ulysse Ndong (to Slavia Sofia)
27	MF	FRA	Igor Djoman (to Gibraltar United)
28	MF	TUN	Mohamed Ben Othman (to (France) Orléans)
33	DF	BUL	Stefan Tsonkov (to Montana)
37	DF	BUL	Ventsislav Kerchev (loan return to Ludogorets Razgrad)
75	FW	ALG	Mehdi Fennouche (to Vereya)
77	MF	BUL	Lyubomir Genchev (released)
91	GK	BUL	Nikolay Bankov (to (Poland) Ruch Chorzów)
—	GK	BUL	Dimitar Nikolov (to Neftochimic)

=== Lokomotiv Sofia ===
In:

No.	Pos.	Nation	Player
6	MF	BUL	Vladimir Semerdzhiev (on loan from Slavia Sofia)
8	MF	BUL	Stoyan Kadifchin (from Bansko)
10	MF	BUL	Iliyan Stefanov (from (Italy) Gozzano)
11	FW	BUL	Denis Stoilov (from (Cyprus) Digenis Oroklinis)
14	MF	BUL	Ivo Ivanov (from Septemvri Sofia)
16	DF	BUL	Vasil Popov (from CSKA Sofia II)
17	DF	BUL	Galin Tashev (on loan from Levski Sofia)
18	MF	BUL	Nikolay Tsvetkov (from Septemvri Sofia)
19	MF	BUL	Mario Yordanov (Free agent)
20	MF	BUL	Zdravko Dimitrov (on loan from Septemvri Sofia)
21	DF	BUL	Viktor Raychev (from Tsarsko Selo)
24	GK	BUL	Ivaylo Yanachkov (from Botev Vratsa)
28	FW	GRE	Efthymios Gamagas (from (Greece) Kerkyra)
33	MF	BRA	Tom (from Beroe)
66	DF	BUL	Aleksandar Branekov (from Septemvri Sofia)
77	MF	BUL	Martin Stankev (from Etar)
92	GK	MKD	Andreja Efremov (from (Portugal) Famalicão)
—	FW	BUL	Atanas Kurdov (from Litex)

Out:

No.	Pos.	Nation	Player
2	DF	BUL	Borislav Nikolov (to Strumska Slava)
4	FW	BUL	Aleksandar Grigorov (released)
5	DF	BUL	Slavi Paskalev (released)
7	MF	BUL	Daniel Peev (to Vitosha Bistritsa)
8	MF	BUL	Bogomil Hristov (to Botev Galabovo)
9	FW	BUL	Dimitar Georgiev (to Dunav Ruse)
11	MF	BUL	Aleksandar Manolov (to Montana)
12	MF	BUL	Martin Dimitrov (released)
14	DF	BUL	Nikola Ivanov (to Hebar Pazardzhik)
15	MF	BUL	Vladislav Misyak (to Arda Kardzhali)
17	MF	GRE	Giorgos Bouzoukis (released)
18	DF	BUL	Miki Orachev (loan return to Levski Sofia)
20	DF	GRE	Anestis Chatziliadis (to (Greece) Agrotikos Asteras)
22	GK	BUL	Dragomir Petkov (to Bdin Vidin)
24	GK	BUL	Aleksandar Lyubenov (loan return to Lokomotiv Plovdiv)
25	DF	BUL	Denis Pidev (to CSKA 1948)
94	MF	BUL	Daniel Vasev (to Montana)
—	FW	BUL	Atanas Kurdov (released)

=== Ludogorets Razgrad II ===
In:

No.	Pos.	Nation	Player

Out:

No.	Pos.	Nation	Player
13	MF	BUL	Veselin Lyubomirov (to Lokomotiv GO)
14	MF	BUL	Slavcho Shokolarov (to Slavia Sofia)
24	DF	BUL	Preslav Petrov (to Dunav Ruse)
44	MF	BUL	Antonio Georgiev (to Botev Galabovo)
71	DF	BUL	Petar Alyoshev (to Botev Vratsa)
73	DF	BUL	Kristiyan Dimitrov (to Lokomotiv GO)
99	DF	BUL	Kristiyan Grigorov (to Botev Vratsa)

=== Maritsa Plovdiv ===
In:

No.	Pos.	Nation	Player
2	DF	BUL	Nikola Marin (from Svilengrad)
3	DF	BUL	Atanas Tasholov (on loan from Botev Plovdiv)
6	DF	BUL	Tsvetan Yotov (from Gigant Saedinenie)
7	MF	BUL	Dzhuneyt Yashar (from Nesebar)
12	GK	BUL	Dimitar Grabchev (from Hebar Pazardzhik)
13	MF	BUL	Nikolay Kolev (from Nesebar)
15	MF	BUL	Svetoslav Chitakov (from Oborishte)
17	MF	BUL	Kostadin Dyakov (from Montana)
19	MF	BUL	Petar Chalakov (on loan from Botev Plovdiv)
22	DF	BUL	Atanas Kumanov (from Levski Karlovo)
23	MF	BUL	Svilen Shterev (from Montana)
—	DF	BUL	Hristo Stamov (from Oborishte)

Out:

No.	Pos.	Nation	Player
2	MF	BUL	Borislav Nikiforov (released)
3	MF	BUL	Krasimir Ivanov (to Sokol Markovo)
6	DF	BUL	Dimitar Hubinov (to Sokol Markovo)
9	FW	BUL	Nikolay Pavlov (released)
12	GK	BUL	Goran Grablev (released)
13	FW	BUL	Ayan Sadakov (released)
14	FW	BUL	Georgi Georgiev (released)
17	MF	BUL	Todor Ivanov (released)
19	DF	BUL	Svetlozar Barashki (released)
21	DF	BUL	Plamen Tabakov (released)
—	DF	BUL	Hristo Stamov (released)

=== Montana ===
In:

No.	Pos.	Nation	Player
4	MF	BUL	Daniel Vasev (from Lokomotiv Sofia)
5	DF	BUL	Stefan Tsonkov (from Lokomotiv GO)
7	MF	BUL	Borislav Baldzhiyski (from Cherno More)
11	MF	BUL	Aleksandar Manolov (from Lokomotiv Sofia)
13	MF	BUL	Yordan Yordanov (from Neftochimic)
17	MF	BUL	Todor Kolev (from Dobrudzha Dobrich)
19	FW	BUL	Miroslav Antonov (from (Israel) Hapoel Ramat HaSharon)
21	MF	BUL	Vladimir Aytov (from Oborishte)
23	MF	BUL	Daniel Georgiev (from Septemvri Sofia)
33	GK	BUL	Ivaylo Vasilev (from Botev Vratsa)
77	MF	BUL	Ivan Kokonov (from Cherno More)
—	DF	BUL	Nikolay Parnarov (from Oborishte)
—	MF	BUL	Svilen Shterev (from Oborishte)

Out:

No.	Pos.	Nation	Player
2	DF	SVN	Marko Jakolić (to (Slovenia) Krško)
4	MF	BUL	Antoni Ivanov (to Septemvri Sofia)
7	MF	BUL	Daniel Genov (to (Cyprus) Enosis Neon Paralimni)
11	MF	BUL	Andreas Vasev (to Dunav Ruse)
12	GK	MSR	Corrin Brooks-Meade (end of contract)
16	MF	BUL	Steven Petkov (to Botev Plovdiv)
17	DF	MNE	Blažo Igumanović (to (Montenegro) Budućnost Podgorica)
19	DF	BUL	Yuliyan Chapaev (released)
21	MF	BUL	Daniel Gadzhev (to Botev Vratsa)
24	DF	ARG	Santiago Villafañe (to (Poland) Ruch Chorzów)
25	MF	BUL	Kostadin Dyakov (to Maritsa Plovdiv)
26	MF	SRB	Đorđe Ivelja (to (Switzerland) Pajde)
28	FW	FRA	Saër Sène (to (Morocco) FAR Rabat)
29	DF	FRA	Bamba Diarrassouba (end of contract)
33	GK	MNE	Nemanja Šćekić (released)
77	FW	SRB	Nebojša Ivančević (released)
—	DF	BUL	Nikolay Parnarov (released)
—	MF	BUL	Svilen Shterev (to Maritsa Plovdiv)

=== Neftochimic Burgas ===
In:

No.	Pos.	Nation	Player
1	GK	BUL	Dimitar Nikolov (from Lokomotiv GO)
7	FW	BUL	Georgi Binev (from Karnobat)
8	MF	BUL	Daniel Stamatov (from Svilengrad)
9	FW	CHN	Ziming Liu (on loan from (China) Shijiazhuang Ever Bright)
12	GK	BUL	Hristiyan Slavov (from Karnobat)
15	DF	BUL	Dimitar Donchev (from Pomorie)
16	DF	BUL	Tsvetan Chahov (from Zagorets)
17	MF	BUL	Zhivko Komelov (from Sozopol)
18	MF	BUL	Kiril Lichev (from Beroe)
19	MF	BUL	Yasen Tuzakov (from Karnobat)
20	MF	BUL	Stoyan Kalev (from Svilengrad)
21	MF	BUL	Tsvetan Filipov (Free agent)
22	MF	BUL	Halibryam Karmadzha (from Asenovets)
23	DF	BUL	Stanislav Zhekov (from Pomorie)
25	MF	BUL	Daniel Stoyanov (from Nesebar)
71	MF	BUL	Zhivko Iliev (from Pomorie)
89	DF	BUL	Andrey Kazaliev (from (Spain) Iruña)

Out:

No.	Pos.	Nation	Player
1	GK	BUL	Yanko Georgiev (to Septemvri Sofia)
2	DF	BUL	Kostadin Velkov (to Slavia Sofia)
3	DF	BUL	Georgi Hashev (to Tsarsko Selo)
6	MF	BUL	Georgi Valchev (released)
7	MF	BUL	Ivan Valchanov (to Septemvri Sofia)
8	MF	BUL	Nikolay Dyulgerov (to (Israel) Hapoel Marmorek)
10	MF	BUL	Galin Ivanov (to Slavia Sofia)
11	MF	BUL	Vladislav Romanov (to Septemvri Sofia)
13	MF	BUL	Yordan Yordanov (to Montana)
15	FW	BUL	Zhivko Petkov (to Pomorie)
17	DF	NED	Randy Onuoha (released)
19	MF	BUL	Mihael Orachev (to Pomorie)
20	MF	BUL	Yani Pehlivanov (to Etar)
21	MF	BUL	Mariyan Ognyanov (to Cherno More)
22	MF	BUL	Emanuil Manev (to Nesebar)
24	FW	BUL	Kostadin Hazurov (to CSKA 1948)
25	DF	BUL	Angel Granchov (to (Poland) Stal Mielec)
26	DF	ROU	Sergiu Homei (to (Romania) Pandurii)
32	MF	BUL	Lyubomir Bozhinov (to Pomorie)
33	GK	BUL	Ivaylo Vasilev (to Botev Vratsa)
71	DF	BUL	Iliya Milanov (to Cherno More)
89	MF	BUL	Stanislav Malamov (released)
91	FW	BUL	Ventsislav Hristov (to (Russia) SKA-Khabarovsk)
96	GK	BUL	Dimitar Nikolov (to Lokomotiv GO)

=== Nesebar ===
In:

No.	Pos.	Nation	Player
1	GK	BUL	Martin Dimitrov (on loan from Botev Plovdiv)
3	DF	BUL	Georgi Kupenov (on loan from Botev Plovdiv)
5	MF	BUL	Aleksandar Bastunov (on loan from Septemvri Sofia)
7	FW	BUL	Valentin Yoskov (on loan from Cherno More)
8	MF	BUL	Ivan Mihaylov (from Botev Plovdiv U19)
9	FW	BUL	Ivan Kolev (from Lokomotiv Plovdiv)
11	MF	BUL	Emanuil Manev (from Neftochimic)
14	MF	BUL	Nikolay Drosev (from Beroe U19)
22	DF	BUL	Dimitar Popov (from Karnobat)
28	MF	BUL	Dimitar Kolarov (from Botev Ihtiman)

Out:

No.	Pos.	Nation	Player
3	DF	BUL	Ivan Stoyanov (to Septemvri Sofia)
7	MF	BUL	Nikolay Kolev (to Maritsa Plovdiv)
15	DF	BUL	Emin Ahmed (loan return to Beroe)
17	FW	BUL	Ivan Tsachev (to Botev Galabovo)
19	FW	BUL	Eray Karadayi (to Oborishte)
20	MF	BUL	Dzhuneyt Yashar (to Maritsa Plovdiv)
22	MF	BUL	Tsvetomir Tsonkov (to Oborishte)
26	DF	BUL	Zhivko Dinev (to (Iceland) Einherji)
28	MF	BUL	Daniel Stoyanov (to Neftochimic)
33	GK	BUL	Rosen Andonov (to Oborishte)

=== Oborishte ===
In:

No.	Pos.	Nation	Player
2	DF	BUL	Angel Delchev (from Sozopol)
3	DF	BUL	Martin Vasilev (from Pomorie)
6	MF	BUL	Nikola Georgiev (from Vihren Sandanski)
8	DF	BUL	Mike Krastev (from Vitosha Bistritsa)
10	FW	BRA	Fernando Henrique (from (Cyprus) THOI Lakatamia)
13	FW	BUL	Kostadin Adzhov (from Septemvri Sofia)
15	MF	BUL	Petar Tonchev (from Septemvri Sofia)
16	MF	BUL	Kristiyan Petkov (from Botev Ihtiman)
17	FW	BUL	Eray Karadayi (from Nesebar)
18	DF	ENG	George Lucas (from (Spain) Villarreal B)
22	MF	BUL	Tsvetomir Tsonkov (from Nesebar)
24	MF	BUL	Iliya Dzhamov (from CSKA 1948)
27	FW	BRA	Jacó (from (Brazil) CS Alagoano)
73	GK	BUL	Rosen Andonov (from Nesebar)
78	MF	FRA	Quentin Guyon (from (France) Pau)
80	MF	BUL	Lachezar Kotev (on loan from Vitosha Bistritsa)
90	DF	BUL	Dimitar Ruychev (from Septemvri Sofia)

Out:

No.	Pos.	Nation	Player
1	GK	BUL	Hristo Ivanov (to Etar)
6	DF	BUL	Hristo Stamov (to Maritsa Plovdiv)
7	MF	BUL	Kiril Lichev (loan return to Beroe)
8	MF	BUL	Svilen Shterev (to Montana)
10	MF	BUL	Vladimir Aytov (to Montana)
13	DF	BUL	Raif Muradov (to Chernomorets Balchik)
14	DF	BUL	Nikolay Parnarov (to Montana)
15	MF	BUL	Svetoslav Chitakov (to Maritsa Plovdiv)
16	FW	BUL	Vasil Tachev (to Kariana)
17	FW	BUL	Dimitar Aleksiev (to Arda Kardzhali)
18	MF	BUL	Kristiyan Ivanov (released)
19	FW	FRA	Taylor Salibur (released)
24	DF	BUL	Iliyan Garov (to Arda Kardzhali)
27	DF	BUL	Nikolay Dimitrov (to Arda Kardzhali)
77	FW	BUL	Georgi Stefanov (to Arda Kardzhali)
80	MF	BUL	Aykut Yanukov (loan return to Lokomotiv Plovdiv)
90	MF	BUL	Antonio Tsankov (released)

=== Pomorie ===
In:

No.	Pos.	Nation	Player
1	GK	BUL	Petko Patsov (from Sozopol)
14	MF	BUL	Zhivko Zhekov (from (England) Brook House College)
16	MF	BUL	Lyubomir Bozhinov (from Neftochimic)
18	FW	BUL	Zhivko Petkov (from Neftochimic)
19	MF	BUL	Mihael Orachev (from Neftochimic)
24	FW	BUL	Boris Tyutyukov (from Botev Plovdiv)
—	DF	BUL	Dimitar Donchev (from Chernomorets 1919)

Out:

No.	Pos.	Nation	Player
1	GK	BUL	Dimitar Iliev (released)
3	DF	BUL	Martin Vasilev (to Oborishte)
7	FW	BUL	Ivan Kolev (loan return to Lokomotiv Plovdiv)
8	MF	BUL	Zhivko Iliev (to Neftochimic)
23	DF	BUL	Stanislav Zhekov (to Neftochimic)
27	MF	BUL	Milen Tanev (to Vereya)
—	DF	BUL	Dimitar Donchev (to Neftochimic)

=== Sozopol ===
In:

No.	Pos.	Nation	Player
2	DF	BUL	Kostadin Stoyanov (from Vereya II)
4	MF	BUL	Dzheyhan Zaydenov (from Pirin Razlog)
16	DF	BUL	Diyan Lefterov (from Karnobat)
50	FW	BRA	Gabriel do Carmo (from (Brazil) Bangu)
83	DF	BUL	Ivan Penev (from Botev Vratsa)
99	FW	BUL	Kiril Grozdanov (on loan from Pirin Blagoevgrad)

Out:

No.	Pos.	Nation	Player
1	GK	BUL	Petko Patsov (to Pomorie)
2	DF	BUL	Angel Delchev (to Oborishte)
5	DF	BUL	Lyubomir Iliev (to Minyor Pernik)
18	FW	BUL	Deyan Hristov (to Lokomotiv GO)
24	MF	BUL	Zhivko Komelov (to Neftochimic)
26	MF	BUL	Yacub Idrizov (to Lokomotiv GO)
96	FW	BUL	Borislav Borisov (to Botev Vratsa)

=== Strumska Slava ===
In:

No.	Pos.	Nation	Player
2	DF	BUL	Borislav Nikolov (from Lokomotiv Sofia)
3	DF	BUL	Samet Ashimov (Free agent)
4	MF	BUL	Georgi Yanev (on loan from Levski Sofia)
19	MF	BUL	Hristo Mladenov (on loan from Pirin Blagoevgrad)
22	MF	BUL	Anton Tungarov (from Septemvri Sofia U19)
84	DF	BUL	Denislav Mitsakov (from Etar)
88	FW	BUL	Petar Dimitrov (from Kariana)
99	GK	BUL	Aleks Georgiev (from Minyor Pernik)
—	GK	BUL	Martin Velichkov (on loan from Slavia Sofia)

Out:

No.	Pos.	Nation	Player
—	GK	BUL	Martin Velichkov (loan return to Slavia Sofia)
—	DF	BUL	Nikolay Velichkov (retired)
—	MF	BUL	Asen Boychev (released)
—	MF	BUL	Metodi Todorov (released)
—	MF	BUL	Valentin Ivanov (released)
—	FW	BUL	Aleksandar Dimitrov (released)

=== Tsarsko Selo ===
In:

No.	Pos.	Nation	Player
4	DF	BUL	Asparuh Smilkov (from (Spain) Compostela)
6	MF	BUL	Yanis Karabelyov (on loan from Slavia Sofia)
15	DF	BUL	Georgi Hashev (from Neftochimic)
19	DF	BUL	Mario Petkov (on loan from Dunav Ruse)
20	DF	BUL	Martin Mitov (from Spartak Pleven)
21	DF	BUL	Mariyan Dimitrov (on loan from Septemvri Sofia)
—	MF	BUL	Ivan Tilev (on loan from Septemvri Sofia)
—	FW	BUL	Tsvetelin Tsakovski (from Balkan Botevgrad)

Out:

No.	Pos.	Nation	Player
4	DF	BUL	Ivaylo Markov (loan return to Lokomotiv Plovdiv)
6	MF	BUL	Lyubomir Hristov (to Minyor Pernik)
7	MF	BUL	Radoy Bozhilov (to Spartak Pleven)
10	DF	FRA	Yassine Amrioui (to (Morocco) Ittihad Tanger)
16	MF	BUL	Aleksandar Yakimov (to Vihren Sandanski)
17	DF	BUL	Ronald Donev (released)
18	DF	BUL	Vasil Popov (loan return to CSKA Sofia)
21	DF	BUL	Viktor Raychev (to Lokomotiv Sofia)
—	MF	BUL	Ivan Tilev (loan return to Septemvri Sofia)
—	FW	BUL	Tsvetelin Tsakovski (released)
