= List of Bulgarian football transfers winter 2018–19 =

This is a list of Bulgarian football transfers for the 2018–19 winter transfer window. Only transfers involving a team from the two professional leagues, First League and Second League are listed.

== First League ==
=== Beroe ===
In:

No.	Pos.	Nation	Player
8	MF	GHA	Carlos Ohene (from (Saudi Arabia) Ohod)
14	MF	CIV	Yaya Meledje (from Septemvri Sofia)
27	DF	EST	Nikita Baranov (from (Norway) Sogndal)
77	MF	POR	Pedro Eugénio (from (Turkey) Altay)

Out:

No.	Pos.	Nation	Player
7	MF	BUL	Martin Raynov (to Levski Sofia)
10	MF	BUL	Borislav Tsonev (to (Croatia) Inter Zaprešić)
13	DF	BUL	Emin Ahmed (on loan to Dunav, previously on loan at Vereya)
18	FW	BRA	Alfredo (released)
26	DF	BUL	Kamen Hadzhiev (to (Hungary) Puskás Akadémia)
70	MF	ROU	Dragoș Firțulescu (to Dunav)

=== Botev Plovdiv ===
In:

No.	Pos.	Nation	Player
7	MF	BUL	Aleksandar Tonev (free agent)
10	FW	CGO	Férébory Doré (from (France) Angers)
24	DF	BUL	Lazar Marin (from (Georgia (country)) Torpedo Kutaisi)
26	MF	BUL	Radoslav Apostolov (loan return from Nesebar)
29	MF	BUL	Zapro Dinev (from Belasitsa Petrich)
66	DF	BRA	Ebert (free agent)
71	MF	BUL	Anton Karachanakov (from (Greece) Panachaiki)
81	MF	BUL	Atanas Zehirov (from Cherno More)

Out:

No.	Pos.	Nation	Player
9	FW	BRA	Diogo Campos (to (Indonesia) Kalteng Putra)
10	MF	BUL	Serkan Yusein (to Ludogorets)
20	FW	BUL	Steven Petkov (to (Portugal) Feirense)
21	GK	BUL	Martin Dimitrov (on loan to Tsarsko Selo)
23	DF	BUL	Yordan Minev (to Tsarsko Selo)
93	MF	BRA	Gustavo Sauer (to (Portugal) Boavista)
—	DF	BUL	Atanas Tasholov (to Neftochimic, previously on loan at Nesebar)

=== Botev Vratsa ===
In:

No.	Pos.	Nation	Player
3	DF	BUL	Martin Kavdanski (from (France) Clermont Foot)
4	DF	EST	Edgar Tur (on loan from (Estonia) Paide Linnameeskond)
8	MF	BUL	Anton Ognyanov (from Vereya)
14	FW	BUL	Miroslav Budinov (from Septemvri Sofia)
17	MF	MNE	Milan Vušurović (from Vereya)
22	DF	EST	Trevor Elhi (from (Estonia) Nõmme Kalju)
23	MF	BUL	Simeon Mechev (from Vereya)
34	GK	FRA	Hugo Cointard (from Strumska Slava)

Out:

No.	Pos.	Nation	Player
9	FW	BUL	Ivan Kolev (to Lokomotiv GO)
17	MF	BUL	Spas Georgiev (to CSKA 1948)
21	DF	TJK	Iskandar Dzhalilov (to (Tajikistan) Istiklol)
23	MF	BUL	Todor Trayanov (to (Poland) KKS Kalisz, previously on loan at Pirin)
34	GK	BUL	Nikolay Bankov (released)
58	DF	BUL	Atanas Fidanin (to Lokomotiv GO)
86	FW	BUL	Valeri Bojinov (to Levski Sofia)
94	MF	BUL	Yuliyan Nenov (to (Morocco) DHJ)

=== Cherno More ===
In:

No.	Pos.	Nation	Player
2	DF	BUL	Tsvetomir Panov (from Ludogorets)
66	DF	FRA	Joakim Balmy (from (Netherlands) SC Telstar)
72	MF	BRA	Rodrigo Henrique (from (Portugal) União da Madeira)

Out:

No.	Pos.	Nation	Player
18	MF	BUL	Atanas Zehirov (to Botev Plovdiv)
23	DF	ALG	Ilias Hassani (to (Qatar) Al-Gharafa)
88	GK	BUL	Blagoy Makendzhiev (to Dunav)

=== CSKA Sofia ===
In:

No.	Pos.	Nation	Player
12	GK	BUL	Slavi Petrov (loan return from Litex)
19	DF	BUL	Ivan Turitsov (loan return from Litex)
22	FW	GAM	Ali Sowe (from (Italy) Chievo, previously on loan)
24	DF	POR	Nuno Tomás (on loan from (Portugal) Belenenses)

Out:

No.	Pos.	Nation	Player
9	FW	BRA	Maurides (to (China) Changchun Yatai)
11	DF	BUL	Stanislav Manolev (to Ludogorets)
18	MF	BUL	Aleksandar Georgiev (on loan to Etar, previously on loan at Septemvri Sofia)
19	FW	BUL	Kiril Despodov (to (Italy) Cagliari)
23	DF	BUL	Aleksandar Dyulgerov (to Septemvri Sofia)
27	DF	SVK	Boris Sekulić (to (Poland) Górnik Zabrze)

=== Dunav ===
In:

No.	Pos.	Nation	Player
2	DF	GHA	Samuel Inkoom (free agent)
7	MF	BUL	Martin Stankev (from Lokomotiv Sofia)
8	MF	BUL	Svilen Shterev (from Botev Galabovo)
10	MF	ROU	Dragoș Firțulescu (from Beroe)
11	MF	BUL	Diyan Dimov (from CSKA 1948)
21	GK	BUL	Blagoy Makendzhiev (from Cherno More)
23	DF	BUL	Iliya Munin (from Vereya)
24	DF	MKD	Aleksandar Isaevski (from (North Macedonia) Pobeda)
77	DF	BUL	Emin Ahmed (on loan from Beroe)
—	DF	AUS	Kristopher Kioussis (from (Australia) Port Melbourne)

Out:

No.	Pos.	Nation	Player
2	DF	BRA	Duda (to (Brazil) Maringá)
7	MF	BUL	Aleksandar Aleksandrov (to Lokomotiv Sofia)
11	MF	BUL	Daniel Pehlivanov (to Hebar)
12	GK	BUL	Filip Dimitrov (on loan to Pirin Blagoevgrad)
17	MF	BUL	Ivan Kokonov (to Arda)
24	DF	BUL	Preslav Petrov (to Slavia Sofia)
25	MF	BUL	Borislav Baldzhiyski (to Tsarsko Selo)
77	MF	BUL	Branimir Kostadinov (released)
94	FW	BRA	Gláucio (to (Armenia) Alashkert)
99	MF	GHA	Derrick Mensah (released)
—	DF	AUS	Kristopher Kioussis (on loan to Pirin Blagoevgrad)

=== Etar ===
In:

No.	Pos.	Nation	Player
7	FW	BUL	Milcho Angelov (from Slavia Sofia)
15	MF	BUL	Aleksandar Georgiev (on loan from CSKA Sofia)
30	MF	BUL	Iliya Dzhamov (from Dobrudzha)
77	MF	SLO	Dino Martinović (from Vereya)
84	DF	BUL	Zdravko Iliev (from Vereya)

Out:

No.	Pos.	Nation	Player
17	MF	BUL	Chavdar Ivaylov (to CSKA 1948)
30	DF	BUL	Dimo Atanasov (to CSKA 1948)
99	FW	CPV	Gilson Varela (released)
—	DF	BUL	Simeon Ivanov (to Hebar, previously on loan at Lokomotiv GO)

=== Levski Sofia ===
In:

No.	Pos.	Nation	Player
17	FW	KAZ	Yerkebulan Seydakhmet (on loan from (Russia) Ufa)
18	DF	BEN	Cédric Hountondji (from (United States) New York City)
20	DF	BUL	Zhivko Milanov (from (Cyprus) APOEL)
70	MF	BUL	Martin Raynov (from Beroe)
86	FW	BUL	Valeri Bojinov (from Botev Vratsa)

Out:

No.	Pos.	Nation	Player
1	GK	SVK	Martin Polaček (released)
3	DF	TUN	Aymen Belaïd (to (Saudi Arabia) Ohod)
6	MF	BUL	Ivaylo Naydenov (on loan to Arda)
10	FW	BRA	Rivaldinho (on loan to (Romania) Viitorul)
20	MF	POR	Filipe Nascimento (on loan to (Romania) Politehnica Iași)
21	GK	BUL	Bozhidar Mitrev (to (Romania) Voluntari)
30	FW	BUL	Iliya Dimitrov (on loan to Septemvri Sofia)
32	MF	FRA	Gabriel Obertan (to (Turkey) BB Erzurumspor)
75	MF	BUL	Aleks Borimirov (on loan to Slavia Sofia)
93	MF	BUL	Atanas Kabov (on loan to Tsarsko Selo)
96	FW	BRA	Luan Viana (on loan to Tsarsko Selo)

=== Lokomotiv Plovdiv ===
In:

No.	Pos.	Nation	Player
7	MF	BUL	Momchil Tsvetanov (from Slavia Sofia)
13	MF	AUT	Edin Bahtić (from (Germany) Mecklenburg Schwerin)
22	GK	BUL	Stamen Boyadzhiev (from Kariana)
88	FW	CRO	Nikola Marić (from (Croatia) Primorac Biograd)

Out:

No.	Pos.	Nation	Player
16	MF	CRO	Duje Mrdeša (released)
88	MF	BUL	Petar Glavchev (on loan to Rilski Sportist)
—	MF	CAN	Alessandro Hojabrpour (to (Canada) Pacific FC)

=== Ludogorets ===
In:

No.	Pos.	Nation	Player
11	DF	BUL	Stanislav Manolev (from CSKA Sofia)
23	GK	BUL	Plamen Iliev (from (Romania) Astra Giurgiu)
63	MF	BRA	David Ribeiro (from (Brazil) Santo André)
77	MF	ROU	Adrian Popa (on loan from (England) Reading)
96	MF	BUL	Serkan Yusein (from Botev Plovdiv)

Out:

No.	Pos.	Nation	Player
9	FW	BRA	Júnior Brandão (on loan to (Brazil) Goiás)
10	MF	BRA	Gustavo Campanharo (to (Brazil) Chapecoense)
11	MF	RSA	May Mahlangu (on loan to (Kazakhstan) Ordabasy)
25	DF	BUL	Tsvetomir Panov (to Cherno More)
37	FW	BRA	João Paulo (on loan to (Kazakhstan) Ordabasy)

=== Septemvri Sofia ===
In:

No.	Pos.	Nation	Player
9	FW	BUL	Iliya Dimitrov (on loan from Levski Sofia)
15	MF	KOS	Suad Sahiti (from (Greece) AEL)
18	DF	BUL	Mateo Stamatov (from (Spain) Espanyol Juvenil A)
20	MF	GER	Christopher Mandiangu (from (Finland) FF Jaro)
23	DF	BUL	Aleksandar Dyulgerov (from CSKA Sofia)
24	DF	BUL	Aleksandar Bashliev (from Pirin Blagoevgrad)
—	FW	BUL	Preslav Yordanov (free agent)

Out:

No.	Pos.	Nation	Player
3	DF	COL	Sergio Castañeda (released)
4	DF	MLI	Alassane Diaby (released)
9	FW	BUL	Miroslav Budinov (to Botev Vratsa)
14	MF	CIV	Yaya Meledje (to Beroe)
15	DF	BUL	Vasil Dobrev (on loan to Arda)
19	FW	FRA	Chris Gadi (to (Egypt) Petrojet SC)
20	MF	GHA	Ishmael Baidoo (to (Poland) Górnik Zabrze)
24	MF	BUL	Aleksandar Georgiev (loan return to CSKA Sofia)

=== Slavia Sofia ===
In:

No.	Pos.	Nation	Player
6	DF	ESP	David Bollo (from (Spain) CD Alcalá)
11	MF	BUL	Radoslav Kirilov (from (Italy) Vis Pesaro)
13	GK	BUL	Georgi Georgiev (from Vereya)
14	MF	MKD	Darko Tasevski (from (Thailand) Khon Kaen)
16	DF	SRB	Dušan Lalatović (from (Serbia) Radnički Niš)
17	DF	KOR	Kim Ho-yeon (free agent)
18	MF	SRB	Luka Spoljarić (from (Greece) Apollon Pontus)
24	DF	BUL	Preslav Petrov (from Dunav)
25	DF	BUL	Ertan Tombak (free agent)
27	DF	NED	Randy Onuoha (from (Netherlands) SV Huizen)
75	MF	BUL	Aleks Borimirov (on loan from Levski Sofia)

Out:

No.	Pos.	Nation	Player
5	DF	BUL	Pavel Vidanov (released)
6	DF	SRB	Nemanja Ivanov (to (Slovenia) Drava Ptuj)
7	FW	BUL	Milcho Angelov (to Etar)
11	MF	BUL	Kristiyan Peshov (on loan to CSKA 1948)
16	MF	BUL	Aleksandar Zlatkov (on loan to Lokomotiv GO)
17	MF	BUL	Momchil Tsvetanov (to Lokomotiv Plovdiv)
25	DF	BUL	Sasho Aleksandrov (to CSKA 1948)
33	MF	BUL	Galin Ivanov (to (Hungary) Szombathelyi Haladás)
55	DF	BUL	Andrea Hristov (on loan to (Italy) Cosenza)
71	MF	BUL	Toni Ivanov (on loan to Lokomotiv GO)

=== Vereya ===
In:

No.	Pos.	Nation	Player
5	DF	KAZ	Midat Galbayev (from (Kazakhstan) Kyzylzhar)
8	MF	SRB	Branislav Vasiljević (from (Greece) Olympiacos Volos)
9	MF	CRO	Hrvoje Rizvanović (from (Serbia) Vojvodina II)
12	GK	BUL	Kristiyan Katsarev (from Tsarsko Selo)
14	DF	RUS	Dmitri Ivanov (from (Russia) Khimki)
18	MF	UKR	Yevhen Dobrovolskyi (free agent)
19	MF	COD	Aurélien Ngeyitala (from (Ukraine) Arsenal Kyiv)
21	DF	FRA	Thimothee Rubin (from (France) Vaulx-en-Velin)
22	GK	UKR	Hennadiy Hanyev (from (Ukraine) Inhulets Petrove)
30	MF	GEO	Shota Gvazava (from (Georgia (country)) Shevardeni-1906)
33	MF	FRA	Josue Ntoya (free agent)
77	MF	LAT	Andrejs Kovaļovs (from (Latvia) Spartaks Jūrmala)
88	MF	UKR	Serhiy Rudyka (from (Belarus) Dnepr Mogilev)

Out:

No.	Pos.	Nation	Player
5	DF	SVK	Tomáš Košút (to (Slovakia) Spartak Trnava)
7	MF	BUL	Simeon Mechev (to Botev Vratsa)
10	MF	BUL	Anton Ognyanov (to Botev Vratsa)
11	MF	MNE	Milan Vušurović (to Botev Vratsa)
16	MF	FRA	Bilel Ait Malek (to (Romania) Sportul Snagov)
17	MF	MDA	Andrei Ciofu (to (Lithuania) Stumbras)
18	MF	BUL	Angel Maksimov (released)
20	MF	BRA	Elias (to Haskovo)
21	DF	BUL	Zdravko Iliev (to Etar)
22	GK	BUL	Bogomil Tsintsarski (to Minyor Radnevo)
24	MF	BEL	Seydina Diarra (to (Belgium) RWDM47)
27	GK	BUL	Georgi Georgiev (to Slavia Sofia)
28	MF	GAB	Alexander N'Doumbou (to (China) Shanghai Shenhua)
30	MF	BUL	Stefan Alichkov (to Balkan Botevgrad)
52	DF	BUL	Iliya Munin (to Dunav)
71	MF	BUL	Milen Tanev (to Pomorie)
77	MF	SLO	Dino Martinović (to Etar)
88	MF	GHA	Michael Tawiah (released)

=== Vitosha Bistritsa ===
In:

No.	Pos.	Nation	Player
23	MF	BUL	Emil Gargorov (free agent)
94	DF	BUL	Yuliyan Popev (from Pirin Blagoevgrad)

Out:

No.	Pos.	Nation	Player
19	MF	ALB	Andi Renja (released)

== Second League ==
=== Arda ===
In:

No.	Pos.	Nation	Player
6	MF	BUL	Ivaylo Naydenov (on loan from Levski Sofia)
14	MF	SLO	Ernest Grvala (from (Bosnia and Herzegovina) GOŠK Gabela)
16	FW	BUL	Petar Hristov (from Pirin Blagoevgrad)
17	MF	BUL	Ivan Kokonov (from Dunav)
21	FW	BUL	Todor Todorov (from Asenovets)
77	DF	BUL	Vasil Dobrev (on loan from Septemvri Sofia)
98	MF	BUL	Nikolay Dimitrov (from Lokomotiv Plovdiv U19)

Out:

No.	Pos.	Nation	Player
2	DF	BUL	Milen Stoev (on loan to Pirin Blagoevgrad)
5	DF	BUL	Borislav Stoychev (to Montana)
6	MF	BUL	Dzhihat Kyamil (to Lokomotiv Sofia)
8	MF	BUL	Krasimir Iliev (to Kariana)
14	FW	BUL	Georgi Andonov (to Tsarsko Selo)
16	FW	BUL	Dimitar Makriev (to (Cyprus) Ermis Aradippou)
98	MF	BUL	Berkay Halil (to Nesebar)

=== Botev Galabovo ===
In:

No.	Pos.	Nation	Player
11	DF	BUL	Asparuh Smilkov (from Pirin Blagoevgrad)
17	MF	BUL	Dzhuneyt Yashar (from Nesebar)
98	MF	BUL	Georgi Tartov (from Litex)
99	FW	BUL	Gabriel Dimanov (from Karnobat)

Out:

No.	Pos.	Nation	Player
21	MF	BUL	Simeon Rusev (to Nesebar)
71	MF	BUL	Halibryam Karmadzha (released)
88	MF	BUL	Svilen Shterev (to Dunav)

=== Chernomorets Balchik ===
In:

No.	Pos.	Nation	Player
4	DF	BUL	Daniel Gramatikov (from Dobrudzha)
9	FW	BUL	Yanaki Smirnov (from Dobrudzha)
14	MF	BUL	Doni Donchev (from Dobrudzha)
73	MF	BUL	Kristiyan Georgiev (from Dobrudzha)

Out:

No.	Pos.	Nation	Player
4	DF	BUL	Mihail Venkov (to Dobrudzha)
7	MF	BUL	Aleksandar Popov (to Lokomotiv GO)
9	FW	BUL	Rumen Aleksandrov (released)
31	DF	BUL	Sevdalin Staykov (to Spartak Varna)
73	MF	BUL	Todor Palankov (to Dobrudzha)

=== CSKA 1948 ===
In:

No.	Pos.	Nation	Player
7	FW	BUL	Radoy Bozhilov (from Botev Ihtiman)
8	MF	BUL	Spas Georgiev (from Botev Vratsa)
9	MF	BUL	Kristiyan Peshov (on loan from Slavia Sofia)
10	MF	BUL	Aykut Ramadan (from Montana)
11	MF	BUL	Denislav Aleksandrov (from Ludogorets II)
17	MF	BUL	Chavdar Ivaylov (from Etar)
25	DF	BUL	Sasho Aleksandrov (from Slavia Sofia)
30	DF	BUL	Dimo Atanasov (from Etar)

Out:

No.	Pos.	Nation	Player
3	DF	BUL	Evgeni Zyumbulev (to Lokomotiv Sofia)
6	MF	BUL	Diyan Dimov (to Dunav)
10	MF	BUL	Tomislav Pavlov (to Minyor Pernik)
11	FW	BUL	Kaloyan Stefanov (released)
15	DF	BUL	Kostadin Slaev (to Bansko)
17	FW	BUL	Yoan Marinov (to Pirin Blagoevgrad)
22	MF	BUL	Veselin Vasev (to Minyor Pernik)
25	DF	BUL	German Petrov (released)
27	FW	BUL	Svetoslav Dikov (to (Slovenia) Tabor Sežana)
39	DF	BUL	Kristiyan Mihaylov (released)

=== Dobrudzha ===
In:

No.	Pos.	Nation	Player
3	DF	BUL	Mihail Venkov (from Chernomorets Balchik)
4	MF	BUL	Todor Palankov (from Chernomorets Balchik)
5	DF	BUL	Kristiyan Grigorov (free agent)
6	MF	BUL	Kristiyan R. Dimitrov (from Kariana)
7	MF	BUL	Nikolay Minkov (from CSKA 1948)
10	MF	BUL	Georgi Kolev (from Lokomotiv GO)
11	MF	MDA	Valeriu Tiron (from (Moldova) Speranța Nisporeni)
12	GK	BUL	Stefano Kunchev (from Vihren)
15	MF	BUL	Petar Tonchev (from Minyor Pernik)
19	FW	BUL	Rosen Krastev (from Pirin Blagoevgrad)
22	DF	BUL	Kristiyan D. Dimitrov (from Tsarsko Selo)
23	FW	BUL	Martin Kirilov (from Septemvri Tervel)
25	DF	BUL	Atanas Kumanov (from Oborishte)
26	FW	BEL	Etienne Mukanya (from (Lithuania) Trakai)

Out:

No.	Pos.	Nation	Player
1	GK	BUL	Dimitar Iliev (released)
3	DF	BUL	Yavor Kolev (released)
4	DF	BUL	Daniel Gramatikov (to Chernomorets Balchik)
5	DF	BUL	Mihail Minkov (to Lokomotiv GO)
7	MF	BUL	Beadir Beadirov (to Spartak Varna)
10	FW	BUL	Rumen Nikolov (to Spartak Varna)
12	GK	BUL	Ivan Ivanov (to Spartak Varna)
14	MF	BUL	Georgi Dimitrov (to Suvorovo)
15	DF	BUL	Georgi Radev (to Neftochimic)
22	DF	BUL	Ahmed Ademov (to Pirin Blagoevgrad)
23	MF	BUL	Doni Donchev (to Chernomorets Balchik)
26	MF	BUL	Iliya Dzhamov (to Etar)
71	FW	BUL	Yanaki Smirnov (to Chernomorets Balchik)
88	MF	BUL	Kristiyan Georgiev (to Chernomorets Balchik)

=== Kariana ===
In:

No.	Pos.	Nation	Player
12	GK	BUL	Petar Nachev (from Bansko)
77	MF	BUL	Krasimir Iliev (from Arda)
99	FW	BUL	Dimitar Georgiev (on loan from Montana)

Out:

No.	Pos.	Nation	Player
12	GK	BUL	Stamen Boyadzhiev (to Lokomotiv Plovdiv)
15	MF	BUL	Angel Rusev (from Partizan Cherven Bryag)
77	MF	BUL	Kristiyan Dimitrov (to Dobrudzha)

=== Litex ===
In:

No.	Pos.	Nation	Player
12	DF	BUL	Nikola Borisov (on loan from CSKA Sofia)
88	MF	BUL	Mitko Mitkov (on loan from CSKA Sofia)

Out:

No.	Pos.	Nation	Player
1	GK	BUL	Dimitar Pantev (to Sevlievo)
15	GK	BUL	Slavi Petrov (loan return to CSKA Sofia)
88	DF	BUL	Ivan Turitsov (loan return to CSKA Sofia)
98	MF	BUL	Georgi Tartov (to Botev Galabovo)

=== Lokomotiv GO ===
In:

No.	Pos.	Nation	Player
5	DF	BUL	Mihail Minkov (from Dobrudzha)
7	MF	BUL	Toni Ivanov (on loan from Slavia Sofia)
8	MF	BUL	Steven Slavkov (from Neftochimic)
9	FW	BUL	Ivan Kolev (from Botev Vratsa)
10	MF	BUL	Aleksandar Popov (from Chernomorets Balchik)
15	FW	BUL	Maksimilian Velkov (from Sevlievo)
20	MF	BUL	Zhak Pehlivanov (from Nesebar)
21	DF	BUL	Atanas Fidanin (from Botev Vratsa)
24	MF	BUL	Aleksandar Zlatkov (on loan from Slavia Sofia)
27	MF	BUL	Filip Angelov (from Slavia Sofia U19)
31	GK	BUL	Hristian Slavov (from Kaliakra)

Out:

No.	Pos.	Nation	Player
5	DF	BUL	Dimitar Kalchev (to Vihren)
7	MF	BUL	Zdravko Zhilov (to Spartak Plovdiv)
8	MF	BUL	Iliya Karapetrov (to Bansko)
10	FW	BUL	Tihomir Kanev (to (Greece) Kronos Argyrades)
15	DF	BUL	Simeon Ivanov (loan return to Etar)
17	MF	BUL	Georgi Kolev (to Dobrudzha)
33	GK	BUL	Simeon Simeonov (to Vihren)
96	MF	BUL	Kristiyan Kitov (to Strumska Slava)

=== Lokomotiv Sofia ===
In:

No.	Pos.	Nation	Player
7	MF	BUL	Aleksandar Aleksandrov (from Dunav Ruse)
9	FW	BUL	Todor Chavorski (from Minyor Pernik)
20	MF	BUL	Dzhihat Kyamil (from Arda)
23	DF	BUL	Martin Vasilev (from Minyor Pernik)
77	MF	BUL	Tsvetomir Vachev (from Pirin Blagoevgrad)
88	DF	BUL	Evgeni Zyumbulev (from CSKA 1948)
94	MF	BUL	Ani Petkov (from Kaliakra)

Out:

No.	Pos.	Nation	Player
4	MF	CMR	Franck Mbarga (released)
6	MF	GRE	Giorgos Bouzoukis (released)
7	FW	BUL	Georgi Netov (to Oborishte)
9	FW	BUL	Kostadin Hazurov (released)
20	DF	BUL	Daniel Aleksiev (to Hebar)
23	DF	BUL	Emil Viyachki (to (North Macedonia) Rabotnički)
77	MF	BUL	Martin Stankev (to Dunav)
79	FW	MKD	Strahinja Krstevski (to (Serbia) Red Star Belgrade)
88	MF	BUL	Bogomil Hristov (released)
94	MF	BUL	Daniel Vasev (released)

=== Ludogorets II ===
In:

No.	Pos.	Nation	Player
80	MF	BUL	Metodiy Stefanov (from Pirin Blagoevgrad)

Out:

No.	Pos.	Nation	Player
31	FW	BUL	Andrian Dimitrov (to Spartak Pleven)
53	DF	BUL	Lachezar Kovachev (released)
62	DF	BUL	Ventsislav Slavov (to Neftochimic)
80	MF	BUL	Denislav Aleksandrov (to CSKA 1948)

=== Montana ===
In:

No.	Pos.	Nation	Player
25	DF	BUL	Borislav Stoychev (from Arda)

Out:

No.	Pos.	Nation	Player
7	MF	BUL	Aykut Ramadan (to CSKA 1948)
11	FW	BUL	Dimitar Georgiev (on loan to Kariana)

=== Nesebar ===
In:

No.	Pos.	Nation	Player
3	DF	BUL	Krastyo Pishev (from Pirin Razlog)
4	DF	CHN	Xuelei Ding (from (China) Sichuan Jiuniu)
6	MF	BUL	Berkay Halil (from Arda)
7	MF	BUL	Simeon Rusev (from Botev Galabovo)
11	FW	FRA	Bryan Comtesse (from (France) FCSR Obernai)
20	MF	BUL	Sava Savov (from Svilengrad)
27	DF	BUL	Atanas Pashaliev (on loan from Botev Plovdiv)
33	GK	BUL	Mario Isakov (from Neftochimic)

Out:

No.	Pos.	Nation	Player
4	DF	CHN	Zheng Zixiang (released)
6	MF	BUL	Radoslav Apostolov (loan return to Botev Plovdiv)
7	MF	BUL	Borimir Karamfilov (to Neftochimic)
9	FW	BUL	Trayo Grozev (to Sozopol)
17	MF	BUL	Dzhuneyt Yashar (to Botev Galabovo)
20	MF	BUL	Zhak Pehlivanov (to Lokomotiv GO)
27	DF	BUL	Nikolay Kostov (to Neftochimic)
33	GK	BUL	Petko Patsov (to Chernomorets Burgas)

=== Pirin Blagoevgrad ===
In:

No.	Pos.	Nation	Player
6	DF	AUS	Kristopher Kioussis (on loan from Dunav)
11	FW	BUL	Kiril Mutavdzhiyski (from Vetren Polena)
19	DF	BUL	Miroslav Pushkarov (from (Iceland) Leiknir)
21	FW	BUL	Viktor Yanev (from Botev Ihtiman)
22	GK	BUL	Filip Dimitrov (on loan from Dunav)
23	MF	COL	Juan Pablo González (from (England) Bedfont Sports)
25	DF	BUL	Ahmed Ademov (from Dobrudzha)
29	DF	BUL	Milen Stoev (on loan from Arda)
44	DF	BUL	Lyubomir Gutsev (from Oborishte)

Out:

No.	Pos.	Nation	Player
6	DF	BUL	Evgeni Tuntev (to Septemvri Simitli)
7	MF	BUL	Lyubomir Hristov (to Minyor Pernik)
8	MF	BUL	Milko Georgiev (loan return to Botev Plovdiv)
16	MF	BUL	Todor Trayanov (loan return to Botev Vratsa)
18	DF	BUL	Yuliyan Popev (to Vitosha Bistritsa)
19	FW	BUL	Rosen Krastev (to Dobrudzha)
20	MF	BUL	Tsvetomir Vachev (to Lokomotiv Sofia)
21	DF	BUL	Aleksandar Bashliev (to Septemvri Sofia)
23	MF	BUL	Mario Topuzov (released)
25	MF	BUL	Metodiy Stefanov (to Ludogorets II)
27	DF	BUL	Asparuh Smilkov (to Botev Galabovo)
29	FW	BUL	Petar Hristov (to Arda)
72	GK	BUL	Ivaylo Yanachkov (released)

=== Pomorie ===
In:

No.	Pos.	Nation	Player
11	MF	BUL	Zhivko Iliev (from Neftochimic)
25	MF	BUL	Milen Tanev (from Vereya)

Out:

No.	Pos.	Nation	Player
16	MF	BUL	Lyubomir Bozhinov (to Neftochimic)

=== Strumska Slava ===
In:

No.	Pos.	Nation	Player
1	GK	BUL	Ivaylo Krusharski (free agent)
20	MF	BUL	Kristiyan Kitov (from Lokomotiv GO)
77	DF	BUL	Slavi Paskalev (from Partizan Cherven Bryag)
84	FW	BEL	Maxime Cosse (from (Oman) Al-Rustaq)

Out:

No.	Pos.	Nation	Player
1	GK	FRA	Hugo Cointard (to Botev Vratsa)
20	DF	BUL	Angel Madzhirov (to Oborishte)

=== Tsarsko Selo ===
In:

No.	Pos.	Nation	Player
1	GK	BUL	Martin Dimitrov (on loan from Botev Plovdiv)
7	MF	BUL	Borislav Baldzhiyski (from Dunav)
8	FW	BUL	Georgi Andonov (from Arda)
9	FW	BRA	Luan Viana (on loan from Levski Sofia)
13	DF	BUL	Galin Minkov (loan return from Litex)
25	DF	BUL	Yordan Minev (from Botev Plovdiv)
93	MF	BUL	Atanas Kabov (on loan from Levski Sofia)

Out:

No.	Pos.	Nation	Player
1	GK	BUL	Kristiyan Katsarev (to Vereya)
5	DF	SRB	Marko Prljević (to (Armenia) Shirak)
7	DF	BUL	Kristiyan Dimitrov (to Dobrudzha)
8	MF	BUL	Nikolay Dyulgerov (to (North Macedonia) Rabotnički)
13	FW	BUL	Vasil Kaloyanov (to Chernomorets Burgas)
