= 2017–18 Bulgarian Cup =

Купа на България

Tournament details
- Country: Bulgaria
- Teams: 32

Final positions
- Champions: Slavia Sofia (8th title)
- Runners-up: Levski Sofia

Tournament statistics
- Matches played: 33
- Goals scored: 99 (3 per match)
- Top goal scorer(s): (Bulgaria) Ivan Petkov (5 goals)

The 2017−18 Bulgarian Cup was the 36th official edition of the Bulgarian annual football knockout tournament. The competition began on 19 September 2017 with the first round and finished with the final on 9 May 2018. Botev Plovdiv were the defending champions, but lost on away goals in the semi-finals to Slavia Sofia. Slavia later won the final on penalties against Levski Sofia, thus acquiring its eight Bulgarian Cup in its history. The club also qualified for the first qualifying round of the 2018–19 UEFA Europa League.

== Participating clubs ==
The following 32 teams qualified for the competition:

2017–18 First League; 14 clubs	2017–18 Second League; 15 non-reserve clubs	Winners of 3 regional competitions 3 clubs
Beroe Stara Zagora; Botev Plovdiv; CSKA Sofia; Cherno More Varna; Dunav Ruse; Etar Veliko Tarnovo; Levski Sofia; Lokomotiv Plovdiv; Ludogorets Razgrad; Pirin Blagoevgrad; Septemvri Sofia; Slavia Sofia; Vereya Stara Zagora; Vitosha Bistritsa	Botev Galabovo; Botev Vratsa; Chernomorets Balchik; Litex Lovech; Lokomotiv Gorna Oryahovitsa; Lokomotiv Sofia; Maritsa Plovdiv; Montana; Neftochimic Burgas; Nesebar; Oborishte Panagyurishte; Pomorie; Sozopol; Strumska Slava Radomir; Tsarsko Selo Sofia	from Northern zone: Sevlievo; from South-East zone: Sokol Markovo; from South-West zone: Vihren Sandanski

== Matches ==
=== Round of 32 ===
The draw was conducted on 24 August 2017. The games will be played between 19 and 21 September 2017. On this stage all of the participants started their participation i.e. the 14 teams from First League, the 15 non-reserve teams from Second League and the 3 winners from the regional amateur competitions.

19 September 2017	Neftochimic Burgas (II)	1–2	Tsarsko Selo Sofia (II)	Balgarovo (Note: The match took place at the Gradski stadion in Balgarovo instead of Neftochimic's home stadium.)
16:00 EEST	Karmadzha 43'	Report	Ganchev 28' (pen.); Minchev 75'	Stadium: Gradski stadion Attendance: 120; Referee: Kaloyan Kirilov (Varna)

19 September 2017	Nesebar (II)	1–4	CSKA Sofia	Nesebar
16:00 EEST	Bodurov 90+1' (o.g.)	Report	Koubemba 15', 30', 60'; Despodov 89'	Stadium: Stadion Nesebar; Attendance: 1,190; Referee: Stanislav Stavrov (Veliko Tarnovo)

19 September 2017	Sevlievo (III)	0–2	Beroe Stara Zagora	Sevlievo
16:00 EEST		Report	Hadzhiev 8'; Negruț 17'	Stadium: Stadion Rakovski; Attendance: 380; Referee: Dimitar Mihaylov (Varna)

19 September 2017	Sokol Markovo (III)	1–4	Dunav Ruse	Markovo
16:00 EEST	Rahov 62'	Report	Jatoba 18'; Georgiev 39'; Kostadinov 45'; Nenov 65'	Stadium: Stadion Sokol; Attendance: 260; Referee: Stefan Pavlov (Burgas)

19 September 2017	Vihren Sandanski (III)	0–2	Septemvri Sofia	Sandanski
16:00 EEST		Report	Kunchev 9' (o.g.); Gadi 88'	Stadium: Stadion Sandanski; Attendance: 450; Referee: Mustafa Shefket (Kardzhali)

19 September 2017	Botev Galabovo (II)	0−1 (a.e.t.)	Levski Sofia	Stara Zagora (Note: The match took place at Trace Arena in Stara Zagora instead of Botev Galabovo's home stadium.)
19:00 EEST		Report	Vutov 111'	Stadium: Trace Arena; Attendance: 860; Referee: Stanislav Todorov (Shumen)

20 September 2017	Botev Vratsa (II)	3−1 (a.e.t.)	Pirin Blagoevgrad	Vratsa
16:00 EEST	Alyoshev 78'; Stoev 102'; Chavorski 120'	Report	Nikolov 37'	Stadium: Stadion Hristo Botev; Attendance: 300; Referee: Ryustem Karageren (Asenovgrad)

20 September 2017	Chernomorets Balchik (II)	0−2	Slavia Sofia	Balchik
16:00 EEST		Report	Krastev 14'; Dimitrov 90'	Stadium: Gradski stadion Attendance: 260; Referee: Nikola Petrov (Lovech)

20 September 2017	Lokomotiv Sofia (II)	2−1	Vereya Stara Zagora	Sofia
16:00 EEST	Ivanov 2'; Tsvetkov 79' (pen.)	Report	Nurgaliyev 35'	Stadium: Stadion Lokomotiv; Attendance: 350; Referee: Georgi Kabakov (Plovdiv)

20 September 2017	Montana (II)	2−1	Cherno More Varna	Chiprovtsi (Note: The match took place at the Stadion Kiprovets in Chiprovtsi instead of Montana's home stadium.)
16:00 EEST	A. Iliev 23'; Atanasov 90+2'	Report	Kuzma 89'	Stadium: Stadion Kiprovets; Attendance: 500; Referee: Volen Chinkov (Sofia)

20 September 2017	Pomorie (II)	2−4 (a.e.t.)	Etar Veliko Tarnovo	Burgas (Note: The match took place at the Stadion Lazur in Burgas instead of Pomorie's home stadium.)
16:00 EEST	Ahmedov 59'; Bozhinov 84' (pen.)	Report	Petkov 39', 66', 96'; Rumenov 111'	Stadium: Stadion Lazur; Attendance: 70; Referee: Dragomir Draganov (Varna)

20 September 2017	Strumska Slava Radomir (II)	2−1	Sozopol (II)	Radomir
16:00 EEST	S. Georgiev 83'; Tasev 90'	Report	Grozdanov 33'	Stadium: Gradski stadion Attendance: 280; Referee: Stanimir Trenchev (Sofia)

20 September 2017	Litex Lovech (II)	1−0	Vitosha Bistritsa	Lovech
19:00 EEST	Radentsov 68' (pen.)	Report		Stadium: Stadion Lovech; Attendance: 180; Referee: Georgi Ginchev (Veliko Tarnovo)

21 September 2017	Oborishte Panagyurishte (II)	2−3 (a.e.t.)	Ludogorets Razgrad	Panagyurishte
16:00 EEST	Netov 77'; Lucas 119'	Report	Quixadá 38'; Keșerü 98', 114'	Stadium: Stadion Orcho Voyvoda; Attendance: 750; Referee: Vladimir Valkov (Plovdiv)

21 September 2017	Maritsa Plovdiv (II)	1−3	Lokomotiv Plovdiv	Plovdiv (Note: The match took place at the Stadion Lokomotiv in Plovidv instead of Maritsa's home stadium.)
17:30 EEST	Gyuzelev 63'	Report	Martinović 46'; Raykov 59'; Bakalov 66'	Stadium: Stadion Lokomotiv; Attendance: 480; Referee: Georgi Davidov (Veliko Tarnovo)

21 September 2017	Lokomotiv Gorna Oryahovitsa (II)	1−3	Botev Plovdiv	Gorna Oryahovitsa
20:00 EEST	Hristov 2'	Report	Baltanov 57', 60'; Álvaro 71'	Stadium: Stadion Lokomotiv; Attendance: 460; Referee: Angel Angelov (Sofia)

=== Round of 16 ===
The draw was conducted on 26 September 2017. The games will be played between 24 and 26 October 2017. On this stage the participants will be the 16 winners from the first round.

24 October 2017	Tsarsko Selo Sofia (II)	3−4 (a.e.t.)	Botev Plovdiv	Sofia (Note: The match will take place at the Stadion Slavia in Sofia instead of Tsarsko Selo's home stadium.)
15:00 EEST	Minchev 33'; Daskalov 62'; Dikov 92'	Report	Minev 31'; Viana 90+1', 98'; Petkov 115'	Stadium: Stadion Slavia; Attendance: 90; Referee: Petar Dorovski (Sofia)

24 October 2017	Litex Lovech (II)	1−0	Lokomotiv Sofia (II)	Lovech
17:00 EEST	Radentsov 90'	Report		Stadium: Stadion Lovech; Attendance: 120; Referee: Angel Bayaltsaliev (Sofia)

24 October 2017	CSKA Sofia	3−1	Botev Vratsa (II)	Sofia
18:00 EEST	Karanga 68'; Despodov 81'; Koubemba 84'	Report	Dimitrov 8'	Stadium: Stadion Balgarska Armiya; Attendance: 790; Referee: Petar Kostadinov (Dobrich)

24 October 2017	Dunav Ruse	2−0	Strumska Slava Radomir (II)	Ruse
18:00 EEST	Georgiev 45'; B. Vasev 59'	Report		Stadium: Gradski stadion Attendance: 230; Referee: Vladimir Valkov (Plovdiv)

25 October 2017	Slavia Sofia	2−1 (a.e.t.)	Lokomotiv Plovdiv	Sofia (Note: The match took place at the Natsionalen stadion Vasil Levski in Sofia instead of Slavia's home stadium.)
17:30 EEST	Mbah 35'; Ivanov 117'	Report	Marchev 59'	Stadium: Natsionalen stadion Vasil Levski; Attendance: 90; Referee: Nikola Popov (Sofia)

25 October 2017	Montana (II)	0−1	Levski Sofia	Sofia (Note: The match took place at the Vivacom Arena - Stadion Georgi Asparuhov, Levski's own stadium, as Montana couldn't finish in time the renovation works of their home venue, and Stadion Kiprovets in Chiprovtsi being unsuitable to host the fixture.)
18:00 EEST		Report	D. Georgiev 55' (o.g.)	Stadium: Vivacom Arena - Stadion Georgi Asparuhov; Attendance: 530; Referee: Stanimir Trenchev (Sofia)

26 October 2017	Etar Veliko Tarnovo	2−1	Septemvri Sofia	Veliko Tarnovo
18:00 EEST	Petkov 19', 33'	Report	Galchev 70'	Stadium: Stadion Ivaylo; Attendance: 630; Referee: Nikolay Yordanov (Sofia)

26 October 2017	Ludogorets Razgrad	1−1 (a.e.t.) (4–3 p)	Beroe Stara Zagora	Razgrad
19:00 EEST	Campanharo 36' (pen.)	Report	Hadzhiev 24'	Stadium: Ludogorets Arena; Attendance: 480; Referee: Georgi Dimitrov (Sofia)
	Penalties
	Keșerü (penalty scored); Campanharo (penalty scored); Sasha (penalty scored); Vasilev (penalty missed); Forster (penalty scored)		(penalty missed) Raynov; (penalty scored) Eugénio; (penalty scored) Negruț; (penalty scored) Tsonev; (penalty missed) Vidanov

=== Quarter-finals ===
The draw was conducted on 1 November 2017. The games will be played between 12 and 15 December 2017. In this stage the participants will be the 8 winners from the second round.

12 December 2017	Botev Plovdiv	5–0	Litex Lovech (II)	Plovdiv
17:30 EET	Petkov 15', 29', 64' (pen.); Brisola 45+1'; Nedelev 87'	Report		Stadium: Futbolen kompleks Botev 1912; Attendance: 1,880; Referee: Stanislav Todorov (Shumen)

13 December 2017	Etar Veliko Tarnovo	1–3	Slavia Sofia	Veliko Tarnovo
17:30 EET	Rumenov 1'	Report	Minchev 13' (pen.); Dimitrov 79' (pen.), 90'	Stadium: Stadion Ivaylo; Attendance: 810; Referee: Petar Kostadinov (Dobrich)

14 December 2017	CSKA Sofia	2−1 (a.e.t.)	Ludogorets Razgrad	Sofia
17:30 EET	Bodurov 9'; Despodov 96'	Report	Moți 34' (pen.)	Stadium: Stadion Balgarska Armiya; Attendance: 14,500; Referee: Georgi Kabakov (Plovdiv)

15 December 2017	Dunav Ruse	0−2	Levski Sofia	Ruse
16:30 EET		Report	Mapuku 23'; Cabral 45'	Stadium: Gradski stadion Attendance: 1,750; Referee: Nikolay Yordanov (Sofia)

=== Semi-finals ===
The draw was conducted on 19 December 2017. The first legs will be played on 10 and 11 April and the second legs are scheduled for 24 and 25 April 2018.

==== First legs ====
10 April 2018	Botev Plovdiv	2–1	Slavia Sofia	Plovdiv
19:00 EEST	João Paulo 18'; N'Dongala 23'	Report	Minchev 31'	Stadium: Futbolen kompleks Botev 1912; Attendance: 3,400; Referee: Valentin Zhelezov (Burgas)

11 April 2018	CSKA Sofia	0−2	Levski Sofia	Sofia
18:00 EEST		Report	Buș 7', 46'	Stadium: Natsionalen stadion Vasil Levski; Attendance: 20,000; Referee: Ivaylo Stoyanov (Petrich)

==== Second legs ====
24 April 2018	Slavia Sofia	1−0 (2a−2 agg.)	Botev Plovdiv	Sofia (Note: The match took place at the Natsionalen stadion Vasil Levski in Sofia instead of Slavia's home stadium.)
18:30 EEST	Dimitrov 66' (pen.)	Report		Stadium: Natsionalen stadion Vasil Levski; Attendance: 1,200; Referee: Stanislav Stavrov (Veliko Tarnovo)

25 April 2018	Levski Sofia	2−2 (4−2 agg.)	CSKA Sofia	Sofia
18:30 EEST	Gómez 6'; Buș 65'	Report	Blanco 57'; Alberg 82'	Stadium: Natsionalen stadion Vasil Levski; Attendance: 24,000; Referee: Nikolay Yordanov (Sofia)

=== Final ===
The final took place on 9 May at Vasil Levski National Stadium in Sofia.

9 May 2018
19:30 EEST

Slavia Sofia	0–0 (a.e.t.)	Levski Sofia
	Report
Penalties
Minchev (penalty scored); Angelov (penalty scored); Dimitrov (penalty missed); Velev (penalty scored); Yomov (penalty scored)	4–2	(penalty scored) Nascimento; (penalty missed) Thiam; (penalty missed) Procházka; (penalty scored) Vutov

Vasil Levski National Stadium, Sofia
Attendance: 29,779
Referee: Nikola Popov (Sofia)

== Bracket ==
Round of 32
2	Neftochimic Burgas	1
2	Tsarsko Selo Sofia	2
2	Lokomotiv Gorna Oryahovitsa	1
1	Botev Plovdiv	3
2	Litex Lovech	1
1	Vitosha Bistritsa	0
2	Lokomotiv Sofia	2
1	Vereya Stara Zagora	1
2	Pomorie	2
1	Etar Veliko Tarnovo (a.e.t.)	4
3	Vihren Sandanski	0
1	Septemvri Sofia	2
2	Chernomorets Balchik	0
1	Slavia Sofia	2
2	Maritsa Plovdiv	1
1	Lokomotiv Plovdiv	3
2	Nesebar	1
1	CSKA Sofia	4
2	Botev Vratsa (a.e.t.)	3
1	Pirin Blagoevgrad	1
2	Oborishte Panagyurishte	2
1	Ludogorets Razgrad (a.e.t.)	3
3	Sevlievo	0
1	Beroe Stara Zagora	2
3	Sokol Markovo	1
1	Dunav Ruse	4
2	Strumska Slava Radomir	2
2	Sozopol	1
2	Montana	2
1	Cherno More	1
2	Botev Galabovo	0
1	Levski Sofia (a.e.t.)	1

Round of 16
2	Tsarsko Selo Sofia	3
1	Botev Plovdiv (a.e.t.)	4
2	Litex Lovech	1
2	Lokomotiv Sofia	0
1	Etar Veliko Tarnovo	2
1	Septemvri Sofia	1
1	Slavia Sofia (a.e.t.)	2
1	Lokomotiv Plovdiv	1
1	CSKA Sofia	3
2	Botev Vratsa	1
1	Ludogorets Razgrad (p)	1 (4)
1	Beroe Stara Zagora	1 (3)
1	Dunav Ruse	2
2	Strumska Slava Radomir	0
2	Montana	0
1	Levski Sofia	1

Quarter-finals
1	Botev Plovdiv	5
2	Litex Lovech	0
1	Etar Veliko Tarnovo	1
1	Slavia Sofia	3
1	CSKA Sofia (a.e.t.)	2
1	Ludogorets Razgrad	1
1	Dunav Ruse	0
1	Levski Sofia	2

Semi-finals
1	Botev Plovdiv	2	0
1	Slavia Sofia (a)	1	1
1	CSKA Sofia	0	2
1	Levski Sofia	2	2

Final
1	Slavia Sofia (p)	0 (4)
1	Levski Sofia	0 (2)

== Top goalscorers ==
As of 25 April 2018

Rank	Player	Club	Goals
1	(Bulgaria) Ivan Petkov	Etar Veliko Tarnovo	5
2	(Bulgaria) Ivaylo Dimitrov	Slavia Sofia	4
2	(Republic of the Congo) Kévin Koubemba	CSKA Sofia	4
2	(Bulgaria) Steven Petkov	Botev Plovdiv	4
5	(Romania) Sergiu Buș	Levski Sofia	3
5	(Bulgaria) Kiril Despodov	CSKA Sofia	3
7	9 players		2
