= Dimitar Todorov =

Dimitar Todorov may refer to:

- Dimitar Todorov (footballer, born 1957)
- Dimitar Todorov (footballer, born 1996)
