= 2015–16 FC Dunav Ruse season =

Dunav Ruse
2015–16 season
- Chairman: Simeon Simeonov
- Manager: Veselin Velikov
- Stadium: Gradski Stadium
- B Group: 1st
- Bulgarian Cup: 1/8 final (knocked out by Litex)
- Top goalscorer: League: Yuliyan Nenov (7); All: Yuliyan Nenov (9)
- Biggest win: 5-0 vs Botev Galabovo
- Biggest defeat: 2-0 vs Loko GO
| Home colours | Away colours |

The 2015–16 season was Dunav Ruse's third time in the B Group, after promotion from the V Group.

== Current squad ==
As of 20 May 2016 Note: Flags indicate national team as defined under FIFA eligibility rules; some limited exceptions apply. Players may hold more than one non-FIFA nationality.

| No. | Pos. | Nation | Player |
|---|---|---|---|
| 1 | GK | BUL | Martin Lukov |
| 3 | DF | BUL | Mario Petkov |
| 4 | DF | BUL | Petar Patev |
| 7 | DF | BUL | Nikolay Kolev |
| 8 | MF | BUL | Ivaylo Radentsov |
| 9 | FW | BUL | Miroslav Budinov |
| 10 | MF | BUL | Georgi Chakarov |
| 11 | MF | BUL | Diyan Dimov (captain) |
| 12 | MF | BUL | Svetoslav Chitakov |
| 14 | DF | BUL | Nikolay Parnarov |
| 16 | DF | BUL | Martin Kovachev |

| No. | Pos. | Nation | Player |
|---|---|---|---|
| 20 | FW | BUL | Yordan Dimitrov |
| 22 | DF | BUL | Mihail Milchev |
| 23 | MF | BUL | Angel Zdravchev |
| 28 | DF | BUL | Atanas Atanasov |
| 70 | MF | BUL | Anton Ognyanov |
| 77 | FW | BUL | Branimir Kostadinov |
| 86 | GK | BUL | Stanislav Antonov |
| 88 | MF | BUL | Yanislav Ivanov |
| 92 | GK | BUL | Radosvet Hristov |
| 94 | FW | BUL | Yuliyan Nenov |

== Bulgarian B Professional Football Group ==
=== Table ===
| Pos | Team | Pld | W | D | L | GF | GA | GD | Pts | Promotion, qualification or relegation |
|---|---|---|---|---|---|---|---|---|---|---|
| 1 | Dunav Ruse (P) | 30 | 18 | 10 | 2 | 53 | 19 | +34 | 64 | Promotion to the First League |
| 2 | Pomorie (Q) | 30 | 15 | 9 | 6 | 36 | 23 | +13 | 54 | Qualification for the promotion play-offs |
| 3 | Lokomotiv Gorna Oryahovitsa (P) | 30 | 13 | 11 | 6 | 42 | 26 | +16 | 50 | Promotion to the First League |
| 4 | Sozopol | 30 | 13 | 10 | 7 | 44 | 28 | +16 | 49 (Note: SOZ 3−1 LIT; LIT 3−1 SOZ) | |
| 5 | Litex II (R) | 30 | 14 | 7 | 9 | 50 | 38 | +12 | 49 (Note: Litex II will be relegated to V AFG regardless of their position at the end of the season, due to the relegation of the first team.) | Relegation to the Third League |

Source: bulgarian-football.com
Rules for classification: 1st points; 2nd head-to-head points; 3rd head-to-head goal difference; 4th head-to-head goals scored; 5th goal difference; 6th number of goals scored; 7th Fair-play points; 8th Draw
(P) Promoted; (Q) Qualified for the phase indicated; (R) Relegated

==== Results summary ====
| Overall | | | | | | | | Home | | | | | | Away | | | | | |
| Pld | W | D | L | GF | GA | GD | Pts | W | D | L | GF | GA | GD | W | D | L | GF | GA | GD |
|---|---|---|---|---|---|---|---|---|---|---|---|---|---|---|---|---|---|---|---|
| 30 | 18 | 10 | 2 | 53 | 19 | +34 | 64 | 10 | 4 | 1 | 29 | 7 | +22 | 8 | 6 | 1 | 24 | 12 | +12 |

Last updated: 29 May 2016.
Source: Soccerway

=== Fixtures and results ===
| 25 July 2015 1 | PFC Ludogorets Razgrad II | 2–3 | Dunav Ruse | Razgrad |

| 1 August 2015 2 | Dunav Ruse | 4–1 | PFC Litex Lovech II | Ruse |

| 9 August 2015 3 | PFC Neftochimic Burgas | 1–1 | Dunav Ruse | Burgas |

| 15 August 2015 4 | Dunav Ruse | 2–0 | FC Sozopol | Ruse |

| 22 August 2015 5 | OFC Pomorie | 1–2 | Dunav Ruse | Pomorie |

| 29 August 2015 6 | Dunav Ruse | 5-0 | FC Botev Galabovo | Ruse |

| 12 September 2015 7 | FC Lokomotiv Gorna Oryahovitsa | 2-0 | Dunav Ruse | Gorna Oryahovitsa |

| 19 September 2015 8 | Dunav Ruse | 0-0 | FC Oborishte | Ruse |

| 27 September 2015 9 | FC Bansko | 1-2 | Dunav Ruse | Bansko |

| 3 October 2015 10 | Dunav Ruse | 3-0 | FC Lokomotiv 2012 Mezdra | Mezdra |

| 17 October 2015 11 | PFC Dobrudzha Dobrich | 1-1 | Dunav Ruse | Dobrich |

| 23 October 2015 12 | FC Septemvri Simitli | 0-4 | Dunav Ruse | Simitli |

| 2 November 2015 13 | Dunav Ruse | 2-0 | FC Pirin Razlog | Ruse |

| 8 November 2015 14 | FC Vereya | 0-0 | Dunav | Stara Zagora |

| 21 November 2015 15 | Dunav | 0-0 | PFC Spartak Pleven | Ruse |

| 28 November 2015 16 | Dunav | 4-1 | PFC Ludogorets Razgrad II | Ruse |

| 6 December 2015 17 | PFC Litex Lovech II | 1-2 | Dunav Ruse | Lovech |

| 27 February 2016 18 | Dunav Ruse | 1–0 | PFC Neftochimic Burgas | Ruse |

| 5 March 2016 19 | FC Sozopol | 0-0 | Dunav Ruse | Sozopol |

| 12 March 2016 20 | Dunav Ruse | 1–0 | OFC Pomorie | Ruse |

| 19 March 2016 21 | FC Botev Galabovo | 0-1 | Dunav Ruse | Galabovo |

| 2 April 2016 22 | Dunav Ruse | 0–0 | FC Lokomotiv Gorna Oryahovitsa | Ruse |

| 9 April 2016 23 | FC Oborishte | 0–1 | Dunav Ruse | Panagyorishte |

| 16 April 2016 24 | Dunav Ruse | 3–1 | FC Bansko | Ruse |

| 23 April 2016 25 | FC Lokomotiv 2012 Mezdra | 1–5 | Dunav Ruse | Mezdra |

| 28 April 2016 26 | Dunav Ruse | 2-2 | PFC Dobrudzha Dobrich | Ruse |

| 7 May 2016 27 | Dunav Ruse | 1–2 | FC Septemvri Simitli | Ruse |

| 14 May 2016 28 | FC Pirin Razlog | 2–2 | Dunav Ruse | Razlog |

| 21 May 2016 29 | Dunav Ruse | v | FC Vereya | Ruse |

| 29 May 2016 30 | FC Spartak Pleven | v | Dunav Ruse | Pleven |

== Bulgarian Cup ==
| 22 September 2015 1/16 Finals | Dunav Ruse | 5-0 | FC Botev Galabovo | Ruse |

| 22 September 2015 1/8 Finals | Litex Lovech | 4-2 | Dunav Ruse | Lovech |
