= Svetoslav Chitakov =

Bulgarian footballer (born 1992)

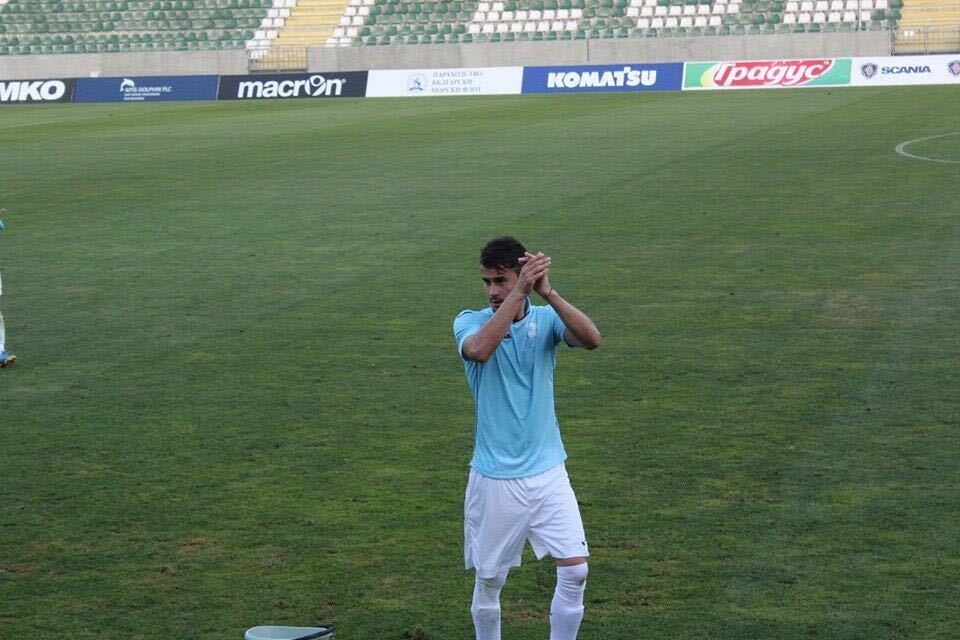

Personal information
- Full name: Svetoslav Lyudmilov Chitakov
- Date of birth: 10 January 1992 (age 34)
- Place of birth: Bulgaria
- Height: 1.86 m (6 ft 1 in)
- Positions: Midfielder; attacking midfielder

Youth career
- Botev Plovdiv

Senior career*
Years	Team	Apps	(Gls)
2011–2014	Spartak Plovdiv	46	(21)
2014–2016	Dunav Ruse	61	(21)
2017	Oborishte	9	(0)
2017	Maritsa Plovdiv	9	(0)
2018	Botev Galabovo	8	(0)
2018–2019	Gigant Saedinenie	25	(14)
2020–2020	Spartak Plovdiv	27	(11)
2020-2022	Sokol Markovo	20	(10)
Total		205	(77)
- * Club domestic league appearances and goals as of 07 March 2023

Svetoslav Chitakov (Bulgarian: Светослав Читаков; born 10 January 1992) is a Bulgarian footballer who plays as an attacking midfielder for Sokol Markovo. He spends his youth years at Botev Plovdiv, but he failed to make a single appearance for the club. He is prolific box-to-box midfielder, as he has good natural fitness and stamina. He spends his best years at Dunav Ruse.

== Career ==
On the summer, 2014, he signed with FC Dunav Ruse, when they were in Third League (V group at the time), and he won the league and the amateur football league cup in his first season with the club. He was a vital part of the club during his second season, also, when they won the Second League (B group at the time). He was the first choice midfielder during the whole period, as he played as a box-to-box occupying the whole middle zone of the pitch. He left the club right before the start of the 2016-2017 Football league season.

On 21 January 2017, Chitakov signed with Oborishte Panagyurishte.

In July 2018, Chitakov joined OFC Gigant Saedinenie.

In January 2020, Chitakov joined Spartak Plovdiv. He played the first 3 games in Bulgaria Third Amateur Football League as a midfielder. He also played in the first cup round against Atletik Kuklen.

He signed with Sokol Markovo. for a year and a half in the summer of 2020. He played mainly as a striker or attacking midfielder during his time with the club. In season 2020/2021 he scored 8 goals in his first 8 games.

== Honours ==
FC Dunav Ruse

- Bulgaria V Group: 2014-2015 Bulgaria V group winner
- Bulgaria B Group: 2015-2016 Bulgaria B group winner
- Bulgaria Cup of Amateur football league: 2015 Cup winner
