= Veselin Lyubomirov =

Bulgarian footballer

Personal information
- Full name: Veselin Atanasov Lyubomirov
- Date of birth: 2 February 1996 (age 30)
- Place of birth: Dupnitsa, Bulgaria
- Position: Winger

Team information
- Current team: Marek Dupnitsa
- Number: 13

Youth career
- Marek 2007
- –2012: Pirin Blagoevgrad
- 2012–2015: Ludogorets Razgrad

Senior career*
Years	Team	Apps	(Gls)
2013–2017	Ludogorets Razgrad	1	(0)
2013–2014	→ Akademik Svishtov (loan)	2	(0)
2015–2017	Ludogorets Razgrad II	31	(0)
2017–2018	Lokomotiv GO	22	(0)
2018–2019	Pirin Blagoevgrad	23	(0)
2019–2021	Marek Dupnitsa	46	(14)
2021	Septemvri Simitli	22	(3)
2022	Spartak Varna	14	(0)
2022–2024	Marek Dupnitsa	67	(10)
2025	Vihren Sandanski	16	(1)
2025–	Marek Dupnitsa	12	(0)

International career
- Bulgaria U17
2013–2014	Bulgaria U19	3	(1)
- * Club domestic league appearances and goals as of 11 June 2026

Veselin Lyubomirov (Bulgarian: Веселин Любомиров; born 2 February 1996) is a Bulgarian footballer who plays as a winger for Marek Dupnitsa.

== Career ==
In July 2017, Lyubomirov joined Second League club Lokomotiv Gorna Oryahovitsa. He left at the end of the 2017–18 season.

In June 2018, Lyubomirov signed with Pirin Blagoevgrad.

== Career statistics ==
=== Club ===
As of 2 August 2015

Club performance			League		Cup		Continental		Other		Total	
Club	League	Season	Apps	Goals	Apps	Goals	Apps	Goals	Apps	Goals	Apps	Goals
Bulgaria			League		Bulgarian Cup		Europe		Other (Note: Includes Bulgarian Supercup matches.)		Total	
Akademik Svishtov	B Group	2013–14	2	0	0	0	–		–		2	0
Ludogorets Razgrad	A Group	2014–15	1	0	0	0	0	0	–		1	0
Ludogorets Razgrad II	B Group	2015–16	2	0	–		–		–		2	0
Ludogorets Razgrad	A Group	2015–16	0	0	0	0	0	0	–		0	0
Ludogorets Razgrad	Total		1	0	0	0	0	0	0	0	1	0
Career statistics			5	0	0	0	0	0	0	0	5	0
