= Emanuele Geria =

Italian footballer (born 1995)

Personal information
- Date of birth: 29 July 1995 (age 31)
- Place of birth: Reggio di Calabria, Italy
- Height: 1.90 m (6 ft 3 in)
- Position: Goalkeeper

Youth career
- –2011: Reggina
- 2011–2013: Siena
- 2013–2014: Trapani

Senior career*
Years	Team	Apps	(Gls)
2014–2016	Trapani	0	(0)
2014–2015	→ Martina (loan)	0	(0)
2015	→ Civitanovese (loan)	1	(0)
2017–2019	Slavia Sofia	4	(0)
2019–2020	Reggina	0	(0)
- * Club domestic league appearances and goals as of 8 March 2020

Emanuele Geria (born 29 July 1995) is an Italian footballer who plays as a goalkeeper.

== Career ==
=== Slavia Sofia ===
On 4 September 2017, after a spending a trials, Geria joined the Bulgarian First League club Slavia Sofia. On 19 March 2018, after an injury of the first choice goalkeeper Georgi Petkov 30 minutes before the match against Pirin Blagoevgrad, Geria made his debut for the team.

=== Reggina ===
On 21 October 2019 he returned to the club he was raised in, Serie C side Reggina, signing a contract until 30 June 2020.

== Career statistics ==
=== Club ===
As of 1 July 2019

Club performance			League		Cup		Continental		Other		Total	
Club	League	Season	Apps	Goals	Apps	Goals	Apps	Goals	Apps	Goals	Apps	Goals
Bulgaria			League		Bulgarian Cup		Europe		Other (Note: Includes Bulgarian Supercup matches.)		Total	
Slavia Sofia	First League	2017–18	2	0	0	0	–		–		2	0
Slavia Sofia	First League	2018–19	2	0	0	0	0	0	–		2	0
Slavia Sofia	Total		4	0	0	0	0	0	0	0	4	0
Career statistics			4	0	0	0	0	0	0	0	4	0
