= Yanko Angelov =

Bulgarian footballer

Personal information
- Full name: Yanko Atanasov Angelov
- Date of birth: 29 June 1993 (age 33)
- Place of birth: Pazardzhik, Bulgaria
- Height: 1.78 m (5 ft 10 in)
- Position: Midfielder

Team information
- Current team: Hebar
- Number: 29

Youth career
- Hebar
- Levski Sofia

Senior career*
Years	Team	Apps	(Gls)
2012–2013	Lyubimets 2007	21	(0)
2014–2015	Montana	34	(2)
2016–2016	Pirin Razlog	8	(1)
2016–2017	Septemvri Sofia	27	(4)
2017–2019	Lokomotiv Plovdiv	53	(1)
2019–2020	Hebar	20	(4)
2020–2021	Montana	30	(1)
2021–2022	Maritsa Plovdiv	30	(1)
2023	Etar Veliko Tarnovo	33	(0)
2024	Maritsa Plovdiv	10	(0)
2024–	Hebar	42	(5)

International career
2012–2013	Bulgaria U21	2	(0)
2010–2011	Bulgaria U19	1	(0)
2008–2009	Bulgaria U17	2	(0)
- * Club domestic league appearances and goals as of 13 June 2026

Yanko Angelov (Bulgarian: Янко Ангелов; born 29 June 1993) is a Bulgarian professional footballer who plays as a midfielder for Hebar Pazardzhik.

== Career ==
=== Septemvri Sofia ===
Angelov joined Septemvri Sofia in the beginning of July after his previous team - Pirin Razlog, merged with Septemvri. He made his debut for the team in the first round of the season in a match against Spartak Pleven. On 26 November 2016 he scored his debut goal for the team in a league match against Levski Karlovo providing the only goal for the 1:0 win. Angelov scored a goal and helped his team win the Promotion playoffs against elite member Montana on 3 June 2017 with 2:1 final result and qualifying his team in the top level after 19 years.

=== Lokomotiv Plovdiv ===
On 10 July 2017, Angelov signed with Lokomotiv Plovdiv.

=== Montana ===
On 20 July 2020 he joined Montana after leaving Hebar. This was his second time at the club, after playing there during the 2014/2015 season, helping them win first place in B Group.

== Career statistics ==
=== Club ===
As of 29 March 2017

Club performance			League		Cup		Continental		Other		Total	
Club	League	Season	Apps	Goals	Apps	Goals	Apps	Goals	Apps	Goals	Apps	Goals
Bulgaria			League		Bulgarian Cup		Europe		Other		Total	
Lyubimets 2007	B Group	2012-13	13	0	0	0	–		–		13	0
Lyubimets 2007	A Group	2013-14	7	0	1	0	–		–		8	0
Lyubimets 2007	Total		20	0	1	0	0	0	0	0	21	0
Montana	B Group	2013-14	3	1	0	0	–		–		3	1
Montana	B Group	2014-15	22	0	3	0	–		–		25	0
Montana	A Group	2015-16	5	1	2	0	–		–		7	1
Montana	Total		30	2	5	0	0	0	0	0	35	2
Pirin Razlog	B Group	2015-16	8	1	0	0	–		–		8	1
Septemvri Sofia	Second League	2016–17	24	3	2	0	–		1 (Note: Includes Promotion playoffs match.)	1	27	4
Septemvri Sofia	First League	2017–18	0	0	0	0	–		–		0	0
Septemvri Sofia	Total		24	3	2	0	0	0	1	1	27	4
Career statistics			82	6	8	0	0	0	1	1	91	7

== Honours ==
=== Club ===
Lokomotiv Plovdiv

- Bulgarian Cup: 2018–19
