= Petar Glavchev =

Bulgarian association football player

Personal information
- Full name: Petar Ivanov Glavchev
- Date of birth: 19 August 1999 (age 27)
- Place of birth: Rome, Italy
- Position: Midfielder

Team information
- Current team: Vereya (on loan from Lokomotiv Plovdiv)

Youth career
- Lokomotiv Plovdiv

Senior career*
Years	Team	Apps	(Gls)
2017–2019	Lokomotiv Plovdiv	4	(0)
2019	→ Vereya (loan)		
2019	Rilski Sportist Samokov		
2020–	Levski Karlovo		
- * Club domestic league appearances and goals as of 22:26, 17 December 2018 (UTC)

Petar Glavchev (Bulgarian: Петър Главчев; born 19 August 1999) is a Bulgarian footballer who plays as a midfielder for Levski Karlovo.

== Career ==
=== Lokomotiv Plovdiv ===
On 31 May 2017 he made his debut for Lokomotiv Plovdiv in match against Ludogorets Razgrad.

On 1 February 2019, Glavchev was loaned out to FC Vereya.

== Career statistics ==
=== Club ===
As of 31 May 2017

Club performance			League		Cup		Continental		Other		Total	
Club	League	Season	Apps	Goals	Apps	Goals	Apps	Goals	Apps	Goals	Apps	Goals
Bulgaria			League		Bulgarian Cup		Europe		Other (Note: Includes Bulgarian Supercup matches.)		Total	
Lokomotiv Plovdiv	First League	2016–17	1	0	0	0	—		—		1	0
Lokomotiv Plovdiv	Total		1	0	0	0	0	0	0	0	1	0
Career statistics			1	0	0	0	0	0	0	0	1	0

== Personal life ==
Glavchev is the son of a famous Bulgarian rapper who goes under the name Vanko 1 (Bulgarian: Ванко 1)
