= FC Sokol Markovo =

Bulgarian football club

Sokol Markovo
- Full name: Football Club Sokol Markovo
- Founded: 1928; 98 years ago
- Ground: Markovo Stadium
- Capacity: 400
- Head coach: Manol Georgiev
- League: B RFG Plovdiv
- 2025–26: B RFG Plovdiv, 3rd
Home colours	Away colours

FC Sokol (Bulgarian: ФК Сокол) is a Bulgarian football club based in Markovo, Plovdiv Province, currently playing in the B RFG Plovdiv, the fifth tier of Bulgarian football. It was founded in 1928.

== Current squad ==
As of 1 September 2019

Note: Flags indicate national team as defined under FIFA eligibility rules; some limited exceptions apply. Players may hold more than one non-FIFA nationality.

No.	Pos.	Nation	Player
3	DF	BUL	Yordan Vranchev
4	DF	BUL	Plamen Gerov
5	DF	BUL	Kostadin Dimitrov
6	DF	BUL	Hristo Stamov
7	MF	BUL	Martin Lazov
8	MF	BUL	Videlin Serdarski
9	FW	BUL	Aleksandar Stoychev
10	MF	BUL	Sezgin Chetin
11	MF	BUL	Aleksandar Drashkov

No.	Pos.	Nation	Player
12	MF	BUL	Georgi Kurtev
13	DF	BUL	Simeon Stalev
14	MF	BUL	Angel Rahov (captain)
16	DF	BUL	Daniel Dimitrov
17	DF	BUL	Teodor Mitrev
20	MF	BUL	Martin Hristozov
22	MF	BUL	Georgi Ivanov
33	GK	BUL	Aleksandar Vitanov
81	GK	BUL	Dimitar Argirov
