= Petar Chalakov =

Bulgarian footballer

Personal information
- Full name: Petar Pavlov Chalakov
- Date of birth: 15 June 1998 (age 28)
- Place of birth: Plovdiv, Bulgaria
- Position: Central midfielder

Team information
- Current team: Litex Lovech
- Number: 14

Youth career
- Botev Plovdiv

Senior career*
Years	Team	Apps	(Gls)
2016–2018	Botev Plovdiv	1	(0)
2017–2018	→ Maritsa Plovdiv (loan)	23	(0)
2018–2021	Lokomotiv GO	64	(2)
2021–	Litex Lovech	32	(0)
- * Club domestic league appearances and goals as of 22 September 2022

Petar Chalakov (Bulgarian: Петър Чалъков; born 15 June 1998) is a Bulgarian footballer who plays as a midfielder for Litex Lovech.

== Career ==
Chalakov started his career at the youth ranks of Botev Plovdiv. On 17 September 2016, he made his professional debut for the club in a 4–0 home win over Lokomotiv Gorna Oryahovitsa, coming on as substitute for Felipe Brisola. On 16 June 2017, he was loaned to Maritsa Plovdiv.

In July 2018, Chalakov joined Lokomotiv Gorna Oryahovitsa.
