= Mihael Orachev =

Bulgarian footballer

Personal information
- Full name: Mihael Malinov Orachev
- Date of birth: 3 October 1995 (age 31)
- Place of birth: Bulgaria
- Height: 1.78 m (5 ft 10 in)
- Position: Midfielder

Team information
- Current team: Minyor Pernik
- Number: 39

Senior career*
| Years | Team | Apps | (Gls) |
| 2012–2013 | Chernomorets Burgas | 0 | (0) |
| 2013–2014 | Neftochimic 1986 | 20 | (2) |
| 2014–2015 | Chernomorets Burgas | 15 | (0) |
| 2015–2016 | Pomorie | 29 | (2) |
| 2016–2017 | Neftochimic Burgas | 20 | (0) |
| 2017–2019 | Pomorie | 45 | (6) |
| 2019–2021 | CSKA 1948 | 8 | (0) |
| 2021 | Montana | 3 | (0) |
| 2021–2022 | Sozopol | 31 | (0) |
| 2022– | Minyor Pernik | 109 | (8) |

International career
| 2011–2012 | Bulgaria U17 | 6 | (0) |
- * Club domestic league appearances and goals as of 11 June 2026

Mihael Orachev (Bulgarian: Михаел Орачев; born 3 October 1995) is a Bulgarian footballer, who currently plays for Minyor Pernik as a midfielder. He is the son of former footballer Malin Orachev.

== Career ==
Orachev spent his entire career at clubs from Burgas or Burgas Province. On 22 June 2017, following Neftochimic's relegation, he returned to his former club Pomorie.
