= Kostadin Adzhov =

Bulgarian footballer

Personal information
- Full name: Kostadin Kostadinov Adzhov
- Date of birth: 19 May 1991 (age 35)
- Place of birth: Samokov, Bulgaria
- Height: 1.85 m (6 ft 1 in)
- Position: Forward

Team information
- Current team: Rilski Sportist

Senior career*
Years	Team	Apps	(Gls)
2009–2010	Levski Sofia	0	(0)
2010	Vidima-Rakovski	0	(0)
2011–2012	Minyor Pernik	2	(1)
2012	→ Bansko (loan)	8	(2)
2012–2013	Septemvri Simitli	17	(1)
2013	Chepinets Velingrad	14	(3)
2014–2015	SV Krenglbach	34	(24)
2015	Rilski Sportist	13	(8)
2016	Pirin Razlog	12	(3)
2016–2017	Septemvri Sofia	28	(12)
2017	Oborishte	14	(0)
2018–	Rilski Sportist	1	(0)
- * Club domestic league appearances and goals as of 21:57, 5 March 2018 (UTC)

Kostadin Adzhov (Bulgarian: Костадин Аджов; born 19 May 1991) is a Bulgarian footballer who currently plays as a forward for Rilski Sportist Samokov.

== Career ==
=== Septemvri Sofia ===
Kostadin Adzhov joined Septemvri Sofia in the beginning of July after his previous team - Pirin Razlog, merged with Septemvri. He made his debut for the team on 6 August 2016 in a league match against Spartak Pleven and scored 2 of the goals for the 4:0 win. He scored a total of 12 goals helping his team to return in Bulgarian First League after play-offs. On 14 June 2017 he left the club after his contract ended.

=== Oborishte ===
On 27 June 2017, Adzhov joined Litex Lovech but a few weeks later signed with Oborishte Panagyurishte.
