= Hristo Mladenov (footballer, born 1999) =

Bulgarian footballer

Personal information
- Full name: Hristo Lyubenov Mladenov
- Date of birth: 1999 (age 26–27)
- Place of birth: Bulgaria
- Position: Midfielder

Team information
- Current team: Litex
- Number: 10

Youth career
- Pirin Blagoevgrad

Senior career*
Years	Team	Apps	(Gls)
2017–2018	Pirin Blagoevgrad	1	(0)
2017–2018	→ Strumska Slava (loan)	8	(0)
2018–2019	Strumska Slava	26	(1)
2020–2022	Septemvri Simitli	47	(0)
2022–	Litex	3	(1)
- * Club domestic league appearances and goals as of 22 September 2022

Hristo Mladenov (Bulgarian: Христо Младенов; born 1999) is a Bulgarian footballer who currently plays as a midfielder for Litex Lovech.

== Career ==
=== Pirin Blagoevgrad ===
In June 2016, Mladenov started pre-season training with Pirin Blagoevgrad's first team. On 5 March 2017, he made his professional debut in a 0–3 away loss against Ludogorets Razgrad, coming on as substitute for Ross Jenkins.
