= Yakub Idrizov =

Bulgarian footballer (born 1990)

Personal information
- Full name: Yakub Halilov Idrizov
- Date of birth: 22 November 1990 (age 35)
- Place of birth: Sliven, Bulgaria
- Height: 1.70 m (5 ft 7 in)
- Position: Midfielder

Team information
- Current team: Zagorets
- Number: 21

Youth career
- Sliven 2000

Senior career*
Years	Team	Apps	(Gls)
2010–2012	Sliven 2000	33	(1)
2012	Nesebar	17	(0)
2012–2015	Vereya	73	(3)
2016–2017	Sozopol	32	(5)
2017–2018	Lokomotiv GO	27	(0)
2018–2019	Hebar	36	(1)
2019	Pomorie	11	(0)
2020–2022	Dobrudzha	56	(0)
2022–	Zagorets	0	(0)
- * Club domestic league appearances and goals as of 4 July 2022

Yakub Halilov Idrizov (Bulgarian: Якуб Халилов Идризов; born 22 November 1990) is a Bulgarian football player who plays as a midfielder for Zagorets.

== Career ==
Idrizov has started his football career in the youth team of Sliven 2000. After numerous games as a captain of Sliven 2000 in the Youth Bulgarian league, he joined the first team which at that time was playing in the First professional league (known as A PFG). He also played for the teams of Nesebar and Vereya. On 19th of January 2016 Idrizov joined the Bulgarian B PFG team Sozopol, after he was released from Vereya where he played for 3 years. Idrizov left Sozopol in June 2017.

In July 2017, Idrizov joined Lokomotiv Gorna Oryahovitsa. He left the club at the end of the 2017–18 season.

On 25 June 2018, Idrizov signed with Third League club Hebar.
