= Antoniy Balakov =

Bulgarian footballer

Personal information
- Full name: Antoniy Ivov Balakov
- Date of birth: 14 December 1988 (age 37)
- Place of birth: Veliko Tarnovo, Bulgaria
- Height: 1.82 m (6 ft 0 in)
- Position: Midfielder

Youth career
- Etar Veliko Tarnovo

Senior career*
Years	Team	Apps	(Gls)
2006–2008	Botev-Bali Debelets	–	(–)
2008–2010	Etar 1924	35	(1)
2010	Pomorie	10	(0)
2011	Lokomotiv Dryanovo	12	(1)
2013–2016	Lokomotiv GO	90	(38)
2017	Litex Lovech	15	(4)
2017–2018	Lokomotiv GO	24	(6)
- * Club domestic league appearances and goals as of 26 May 2018

Antoniy Balakov (Bulgarian: Антоний Балъков; born 14 December 1988) is a Bulgarian footballer who plays as a midfielder. He is a nephew of former footballer Krasimir Balakov.

== Career ==
On 20 January 2017, Balakov joined Litex Lovech. He helped the team to achieve promotion to Second League but was released in June. In July 2017, he returned to Lokomotiv Gorna Oryahovitsa. He left the club at the end of the 2017–18 season.
