= Marc-Gauthier Bedimé =

Cameroonian footballer (born 1994)

Personal information
- Date of birth: 29 December 1994 (age 31)
- Place of birth: Dibombari, Cameroon
- Height: 1.75 m (5 ft 9 in)
- Position: Right-back

Senior career*
| Years | Team | Apps | (Gls) |
| 2011–2014 | Sochaux B | 34 | (0) |
| 2015–2017 | Belfort | 42 | (0) |
| 2017 | Lokomotiv Plovdiv | 4 | (0) |
| 2018 | Belfort | 10 | (0) |
| 2019 | Bergerac | 3 | (0) |
| 2019–2020 | Vendée Fontenay | 19 | (1) |
| 2022– | La Châtaigneraie | | |

International career
| | France U16 | 15 | (0) |
| | France U17 | 8 | (2) |
| 2017 | France U18 | | |
- * Club domestic league appearances and goals as of 1 July 2024

Marc-Gauthier Bedimé (born 29 December 1994) is a footballer who plays as a right-back for Vendée Fontenay Foot. Born in Cameroon, he represented France at youth level.
