= Boris Tyutyukov =

Bulgarian footballer

Personal information
- Full name: Boris Pavlov Tyutyukov
- Date of birth: 28 October 1997 (age 29)
- Place of birth: Sofia, Bulgaria
- Height: 1.86 m (6 ft 1 in)
- Position: Forward

Team information
- Current team: Radnički Niš
- Number: 29

Youth career
- 2010–2016: Botev Plovdiv

Senior career*
Years	Team	Apps	(Gls)
2016–2017	Botev Plovdiv	8	(0)
2016	→ Vitosha Bistritsa (loan)	3	(0)
2017–2019	Pomorie	54	(5)
2019–2020	CSKA 1948	9	(2)
2020	Litex Lovech	13	(2)
2021	Sozopol	34	(8)
2022–2023	Minyor Pernik	26	(9)
2023–2024	Pirin Blagoevgrad	36	(4)
2024–2025	Arda Kardzhali	25	(2)
2025–	Radnički Niš	0	(0)
- * Club domestic league appearances and goals as of 25 January 2025

Boris Pavlov Tyutyukov (Bulgarian: Борис Павлов Тютюков; born 28 October 1997) is a Bulgarian footballer who plays as a forward for Radnički Niš.

== Career ==
Tyutyukov made his A Group debut on 6 March 2016, when he came on as a substitute during the 1–1 away draw against Beroe Stara Zagora. A week later, on 13 March, he came on a substitute during the 3–1 win over Cherno more Varna.

On 29 April Tyutyukov was included in the starting lineup for the 2–2 draw with PFC Pirin Blagoevgrad. Unfortunately, he performed below expectations and was replaced in the 26th minute.

Tyutyukov left Botev Plovdiv in June 2017. In July 2017, he joined Pomorie. In February 2024, Tyutyukov became part of the ranks of Arda Kardzhali, signing a two-and-a-half-year contract.
