= Ivaylo Vasilev (footballer, born 1991) =

Bulgarian footballer

Personal information
- Full name: Ivaylo Angelov Vasilev
- Date of birth: 15 January 1991 (age 35)
- Place of birth: Bulgaria
- Height: 1.84 m (6 ft 0 in)
- Position: Goalkeeper

Youth career
- –1998: Lokomotiv Sofia
- 1998–2008: CSKA Sofia
- 2008–2009: Levski Sofia

Senior career*
Years	Team	Apps	(Gls)
2009–2013	Levski Sofia	1	(0)
2009–2010	→ Chavdar BS (loan)	15	(0)
2011–2012	→ Vidima-Rakovski (loan)	25	(0)
2013	→ Septemvri Simitli (loan)	8	(0)
2013	Haskovo	7	(0)
2014–2016	Montana	13	(0)
2017	Neftochimic Burgas	1	(0)
2017	Botev Vratsa	2	(0)
2017–2019	Montana	50	(0)
2019–2020	Lokomotiv Sofia	36	(0)
2021	Lokomotiv Plovdiv	0	(0)
2021–2022	Hebar	0	(0)
2022–2022	Sportist Svoge	9	(0)

International career
2011	Bulgaria U21	2	(0)
- * Club domestic league appearances and goals as of 3 January 2023

Ivaylo Vasilev (Bulgarian: Ивайло Василев; born 15 January 1991) is a Bulgarian footballer who plays as a goalkeeper.

== Career ==
After starting his career with Lokomotiv Sofia, Vasilev joined the CSKA Sofia academy when he was 7 years old, where he honed his footballing skills. Vasilev then was signed in the 2008–09 season by Levski Sofia.

In January 2017, Vasilev joined Neftochimic Burgas. On 16 June 2017, he moved to Botev Vratsa but left the club in August.

On 1 September 2017, Vasilev signed a two-year contract with his former club Montana.
