= Petar Tonchev =

Bulgarian footballer

Personal information
- Full name: Petar Ilianov Tonchev
- Date of birth: 8 April 1989 (age 37)
- Place of birth: Pleven, Bulgaria
- Height: 1.70 m (5 ft 7 in)
- Position: Winger

Team information
- Current team: Pershore Town

Senior career*
| Years | Team | Apps | (Gls) |
| 2009–2011 | Chavdar Etropole | 66 | (7) |
| 2012–2013 | Bansko | 33 | (4) |
| 2013–2014 | Marek | 38 | (7) |
| 2015 | Pirin Blagoevgrad | 11 | (1) |
| 2015–2017 | Septemvri Sofia | 24 | (6) |
| 2016 | → Pirin Razlog (loan) | 13 | (1) |
| 2017 | Oborishte | 16 | (4) |
| 2018 | Asteras Vlachioti | ? | (?) |
| 2018 | Minyor Pernik | 14 | (3) |
| 2019 | Dobrudzha | 11 | (1) |
| 2019–2020 | Spartak Pleven | 16 | (0) |
| 2020–2021 | FC Stratford | | |
| 2021– | Pershore Town | | |
- * Club domestic league appearances and goals as of 6 October 2022

Petar Tonchev (Bulgarian: Петър Тончев; born 8 April 1989) is a Bulgarian footballer who plays as a winger for Pershore Town.

== Career ==
On 7 July 2017, Tonchev signed with Oborishte.

In June 2018, he joined Second League club Tsarsko Selo but a few weeks later agreed terms with Minyor Pernik. In February 2020 he signed for FC Stratford. Chicken Farmer by trade, Petar went down the avenue of Plum Farming in November 2021 at Pershore Town.
