= Dimitar Todorov (footballer, born 1996) =

Bulgarian footballer

Personal information
- Date of birth: 8 November 1996 (age 30)
- Place of birth: Sofia, Bulgaria
- Positions: Defender; midfielder

Youth career
- –2015: Slavia Sofia

Senior career*
Years	Team	Apps	(Gls)
2015	Slavia Sofia	1	(0)
2015	Ludogorets II	5	(0)
2016	Lokomotiv Sofia		
2017	Slavia Sofia	0	(0)
2017	Botev Vratsa	0	(0)
2018	Neftochimic	6	(0)
- * Club domestic league appearances and goals as of 31 May 2018

Dimitar Todorov (Bulgarian: Димитър Тодоров; born 8 November 1996) is a Bulgarian footballer who plays as a defender.

== Career ==
On 27 May 2015, Todorov made his professional debut for his hometown club Slavia Sofia in a 1–0 away win against Haskovo, coming on as substitute for Yanis Karabelyov. In the summer of 2015 he moved to Ludogorets Razgrad II but was released in 6 months. In January 2016, Todorov joined Lokomotiv Sofia. On 17 February 2017, he returned to Slavia Sofia.

In July 2017, Todorov signed with Botev Vratsa.

In February 2018, Todorov joined Neftochimic. He left the club at the end of the season.
