= Martin Vasilev =

Bulgarian footballer

Personal information
- Full name: Martin Nikolaev Vasilev
- Date of birth: 2 January 1992 (age 34)
- Place of birth: Sofia, Bulgaria
- Height: 1.76 m (5 ft 9 in)
- Position: Defender

Youth career
- CSKA Sofia

Senior career*
Years	Team	Apps	(Gls)
2010–2012	CSKA Sofia	0	(0)
2011–2012	→ Akademik Sofia (loan)	21	(1)
2012	→ Botev Vratsa (loan)	9	(0)
2013	Vidima-Rakovski	11	(0)
2013	Montana	6	(0)
2014–2015	Vitosha Bistritsa	25	(6)
2015	Oborishte	11	(0)
2016–2017	Pomorie	20	(1)
2017–2018	Oborishte	26	(2)
2018	Minyor Pernik	16	(0)
2019–2021	Lokomotiv Sofia	51	(1)
2021	Chavdar Etropole	18	(2)
2022	Spartak Varna	7	(0)
- * Club domestic league appearances and goals as of 4 July 2022

Martin Nikolaev Vasilev (Bulgarian: Мартин Николаев Василев; born 2 January 1992) is a Bulgarian footballer who plays as a defender.

== Career ==
On 19 June 2017, Vasilev was released by Pomorie and returned to his former club Oborishte Panagyurishte a few weeks later.

On 2 July 2018, Vasilev joined Minyor Pernik.
