= Martin Dimitrov (footballer, born 1996) =

Bulgarian footballer

Personal information
- Full name: Martin Dimitrov Dimitrov
- Date of birth: 20 March 1996 (age 30)
- Place of birth: Plovdiv, Bulgaria
- Height: 1.83 m (6 ft 0 in)
- Position: Goalkeeper

Youth career
- Maritsa Plovdiv
- –2016: Botev Plovdiv

Senior career*
Years	Team	Apps	(Gls)
2015–2019	Botev Plovdiv	2	(0)
2017–2018	→ Nesebar (loan)	26	(0)
2019	→ Tsarsko Selo (loan)	8	(0)
2019–2020	Tsarsko Selo	7	(0)
- * Club domestic league appearances and goals as of 1 June 2020

Martin Dimitrov (Bulgarian: Мартин Димитров; born 20 March 1996) is a Bulgarian footballer who plays as a goalkeeper.

== Career ==
=== Botev Plovdiv ===
Dimitrov began his youth career with Maritsa Plovdiv before moving to Botev Plovdiv. On 24 April 2016, he made his debut for the team in the A Group in the local derby against Lokomotiv Plovdiv.

==== Nesebar (loan) ====
On 16 June 2017, he was sent on loan to Maritsa Plovdiv but a week later the deal was cancelled and he moved to Nesebar.

== Career statistics ==
=== Club ===
As of 27 May 2016

Club performance			League		Cup		Continental		Other		Total	
Club	League	Season	Apps	Goals	Apps	Goals	Apps	Goals	Apps	Goals	Apps	Goals
Bulgaria			League		Bulgarian Cup		Europe		Other (Note: Includes Bulgarian Supercup matches.)		Total	
Botev Plovdiv	A Group	2015–16	2	0	0	0	0 (Note: UEFA Europa League matches.)	0	–		2	0
Botev Plovdiv	Total		2	0	0	0	0	0	0	0	2	0
Career statistics			2	0	0	0	0	0	0	0	2	0

== Honours ==
Botev Plovdiv

- Bulgarian Cup: 2016–17
