= Kristiyan Grigorov =

Bulgarian footballer

Personal information
- Full name: Kristiyan Krasimirov Grigorov
- Date of birth: 27 October 1990 (age 36)
- Place of birth: Pleven, Bulgaria
- Height: 1.96 m (6 ft 5 in)
- Position: Centre-back

Team information
- Current team: Levski Lom
- Number: 5

Youth career
- Belite Orli Pleven

Senior career*
Years	Team	Apps	(Gls)
2008–2010	Belite Orli Pleven	38	(1)
2010–2011	Chavdar Byala Slatina	30	(3)
2011–2013	Spartak Pleven	32	(2)
2013–2014	Dunav Ruse	16	(1)
2014–2015	Spartak Pleven	39	(9)
2015–2017	Ludogorets Razgrad II	40	(4)
2016–2017	Ludogorets Razgrad	2	(1)
2017–2018	Botev Vratsa	28	(2)
2018	Kariana	5	(0)
2019	Dobrudzha	11	(1)
2019–2020	Spartak Pleven	19	(1)
2020–	Levski Lom	0	(0)
- * Club domestic league appearances and goals as of 1 August 2020

Kristiyan Krasimirov Grigorov (Bulgarian: Кристиян Григоров; born 27 October 1990) is a Bulgarian footballer who plays as a centre-back for Levski Lom.

== Career ==
=== Ludogorets Razgrad ===
On 28 May 2017 he complete his debut for the first team in the First League, scoring one of the goals for the 3:1 win over Cherno More.

=== Botev Vratsa ===
On 13 June 2017, Grigorov joined Botev Vratsa. He left the club at the end of the 2017–18 season when his contract expired.

=== Kariana ===
On 26 July 2018, Grigorov signed with Kariana.
