= Atanas Fidanin =

Bulgarian footballer

Personal information
- Full name: Atanas Aleksandrov Fidanin
- Date of birth: 9 August 1986 (age 40)
- Place of birth: Gotse Delchev, Bulgaria
- Height: 1.84 m (6 ft 0 in)
- Position: Left back

Team information
- Current team: Sevlievo
- Number: 6

Senior career*
Years	Team	Apps	(Gls)
2003–2007	Levski Sofia	0	(0)
2004–2006	→ Rodopa Smolyan (loan)	6	(0)
2006–2007	→ Vidima-Rakovski (loan)	22	(1)
2007–2009	Chernomorets Burgas	25	(1)
2009–2011	Montana	26	(0)
2012–2013	Pirin Gotse Delchev	62	(0)
2014–2017	Lokomotiv GO	80	(5)
2017–2018	Botev Vratsa	35	(1)
2019	Lokomotiv GO	25	(4)
2020–	Sevlievo	0	(0)

International career
2007	Bulgaria U21		
- * Club domestic league appearances and goals as of 15 December 2019

Atanas Fidanin (Bulgarian: Атанас Фиданин; born 9 August 1986) is a Bulgarian footballer who plays as a left back for Sevlievo. He was raised in Levski Sofia's youth teams.

== Career ==
Fidanin started his career at Levski Sofia. After that he played on loan for Rodopa Smolyan and Vidima-Rakovski. In June 2007 he signed with Chernomorets Burgas for fee of €20 000 from Levski. From July 2009 he was part of the PFC Montana squad. He was released from PFC Montana in June 2011.

Fidanin spent three full seasons at Lokomotiv Gorna Oryahovitsa but left the club in July 2017 when his contract expired.

In July 2017, Fidanin signed with Botev Vratsa.
