= Hristo Stamov =

Bulgarian footballer

Personal information
- Full name: Hristo Kirilov Stamov
- Date of birth: 2 January 1994 (age 32)
- Place of birth: Plovdiv, Bulgaria
- Height: 1.85 m (6 ft 1 in)
- Position: Defender

Youth career
- Lokomotiv Plovdiv

Senior career*
Years	Team	Apps	(Gls)
2012–2015	Lokomotiv Plovdiv	55	(0)
2014	→ Eurocollege (loan)	12	(3)
2016–2017	Oborishte	40	(0)
2017	Maritsa Plovdiv	3	(0)

International career
2010	Bulgaria U17	10	(0)
2012	Bulgaria U19	5	(1)
- * Club domestic league appearances and goals as of 7 August 2017

Hristo Kirilov Stamov (Bulgarian: Христо Кирилов Стамов; born 2 January 1994) is a Bulgarian footballer who plays as a defender.
