= Nikolay Kolev (footballer) =

Bulgarian footballer (born 1990)

Personal information
- Full name: Nikolay Veneslavov Kolev
- Date of birth: 29 March 1990 (age 36)
- Place of birth: Bulgaria
- Height: 1.85 m (6 ft 1 in)
- Position: Midfielder

Team information
- Current team: Oborishte
- Number: 10

Senior career*
Years	Team	Apps	(Gls)
2010–2011	Dobrudzha Dobrich	24	(2)
2011–2012	Svilengrad 1921	?	(?)
2013–2014	Lyubimets 2007	35	(2)
2014–2016	Dunav Ruse	69	(9)
2017	Nesebar	10	(1)
2017–2018	Maritsa Plovdiv	17	(0)
2018–	Oborishte	21	(4)
- * Club domestic league appearances and goals as of 26 May 2019

Nikolay Kolev (Bulgarian: Николай Колев; born 29 March 1990) is a Bulgarian footballer who plays as a midfielder for Oborishte Panagyurishte.

== Career ==
On 24 January 2017, Kolev signed with Nesebar. He moved to Maritsa Plovdiv in June 2017. He left the club at the end of the 2017–18 season following the relegation to Third League.

In July 2018, Kolev joined Oborishte.
