= Martin Stankev =

Bulgarian footballer

Personal information
- Full name: Martin Mariov Stankev
- Date of birth: 29 July 1989 (age 37)
- Place of birth: Sofia, Bulgaria
- Height: 1.80 m (5 ft 11 in)
- Position: Midfielder

Team information
- Current team: Vitosha Bistritsa
- Number: 80

Youth career
- Slavia Sofia

Senior career*
Years	Team	Apps	(Gls)
2008	Sportist Svoge		
2009	Marek Dupnitsa		
2009–2011	Vihren Sandanski	38	(5)
2011–2012	Etar 1924	28	(2)
2013–2014	Bansko	45	(7)
2015–2017	Slavia Sofia	7	(1)
2017	Etar	1	(0)
2017–2018	Lokomotiv Sofia	34	(5)
2019	Dunav Ruse	8	(0)
2019–2020	Vitosha Bistritsa	11	(0)
2020–2021	Sportist Svoge	4	(0)
2021	Botev Ihtiman		(2)
2021–2022	Kostinbrod	17	(1)
2022–	Vitosha Bistritsa	24	(4)
- * Club domestic league appearances and goals as of 5 June 2023

Martin Mariov Stankev (Bulgarian: Мартин Мариов Станкев; born 29 July 1989) is a Bulgarian footballer who plays as a midfielder for Vitosha Bistritsa.

Stankev joined Etar at the beginning of the 2017–18 season but was released shortly afterwards.
