= Kiril Grozdanov =

Bulgarian footballer

Personal information
- Date of birth: 27 September 1997 (age 29)
- Place of birth: Blagoevgrad, Bulgaria
- Position: Forward

Team information
- Current team: Septemvri Simitli
- Number: 99

Youth career
- Pirin Blagoevgrad

Senior career*
| Years | Team | Apps | (Gls) |
| 2015– | Pirin Blagoevgrad | 26 | (0) |
| 2017–2018 | → Sozopol (loan) | 19 | (1) |
| 2020– | Septemvri Simitli | 10 | (0) |

International career
| 2017 | Bulgaria U21 | 2 | (0) |
- * Club domestic league appearances and goals as of 15 October 2021

Kiril Grozdanov (Bulgarian: Кирил Грозданов; born 27 September 1997) is a Bulgarian footballer who plays as a forward for Bulgarian Second League club Septemvri Simitli.

== Club career ==
=== Pirin Blagoevgrad ===
On 26 July 2016, Grozdanov signed his first professional contract with Pirin Blagoevgrad. On 31 August 2017, he was sent on a season-long loan at Second League club Sozopol.
