= List of Bulgarian football transfers summer 2018 =

This is a list of Bulgarian football transfers for the 2018 summer transfer window. Only transfers involving a team from the two professional leagues, First League and Second League are listed.

== First League ==
=== Beroe ===
In:

No.	Pos.	Nation	Player
4	DF	TUR	Erol Alkan (from (Netherlands) Dordrecht)
5	MF	POR	Mesca (from (Cyprus) AEL Limassol)
6	MF	BUL	Aleksandar Tsvetkov (from Cherno More)
18	FW	BRA	Alfredo (from (Brazil) Uberlândia)
19	DF	BUL	Aleksandar Vasilev (from Ludogorets)
21	MF	BUL	Vladimir Gadzhev (from (Cyprus) Anorthosis)
25	DF	BUL	Georgi Angelov (from Levski Sofia)
73	MF	BUL	Ivan Minchev (from Slavia Sofia)
77	MF	BRA	Wanderson (from (Greece) Lamia)

Out:

No.	Pos.	Nation	Player
1	GK	BUL	Mihail Mihailov (released, previously on loan at Botev Galabovo)
5	DF	BUL	Pavel Vidanov (to Slavia Sofia)
6	DF	BUL	Ivan Ivanov (to (Turkey) Altay)
8	MF	GHA	Carlos Ohene (to (Saudi Arabia) Ohod)
13	DF	BUL	Emin Ahmed (on loan to Vereya)
15	DF	BUL	Georgi Dinkov (to Dunav Ruse)
16	MF	SRB	Marko Adamović (to (Cyprus) AEL Limassol)
21	FW	ROU	Sergiu Negruț (to (Hungary) Kisvárda)
22	GK	BUL	Bogomil Tsintsarski (to Vereya, previously on loan)
24	MF	BUL	Nikola Gavov (on loan to Montana)
28	DF	BUL	Veselin Penev (retired)
71	MF	BUL	Anton Karachanakov (loan return to (Poland) Cracovia)
77	MF	POR	Pedro Eugénio (to (Turkey) Altay)

=== Botev Plovdiv ===
In:

No.	Pos.	Nation	Player
2	DF	BRA	Johnathan (from (Ukraine) Stal Kamianske)
5	DF	BUL	Kristian Dimitrov (loan return from Montana)
6	DF	BUL	Kostadin Nichev (from Pirin Blagoevgrad)
16	MF	BUL	Vasil Shopov (from Dunav Ruse)
21	GK	BUL	Martin Dimitrov (loan return from Nesebar)
39	MF	BUL	Antonio Vutov (from (Italy) Udinese)

Out:

No.	Pos.	Nation	Player
6	MF	BRA	Álvaro Juliano (to (Italy) Catanzaro)
7	MF	BRA	Felipe Brisola (to (Latvia) Riga FC)
11	MF	BUL	Toni Tasev (to Montana, previously on loan)
14	DF	BUL	Dimitar Kalchev (to Lokomotiv GO)
21	GK	BUL	Simeon Simeonov (to Lokomotiv GO)
24	DF	BUL	Lazar Marin (to (Georgia (country)) Torpedo Kutaisi)
29	MF	FRA	Daudet N'Dongala (to (Romania) Politehnica Iași)
30	DF	BUL	Angel Bastunov (to Kariana)
37	FW	BRA	João Paulo (loan return to Ludogorets)
70	DF	BUL	Plamen Dimov (to Cherno More)
77	MF	BUL	Milko Georgiev (on loan to Pirin Blagoevgrad)
—	DF	BUL	Atanas Tasholov (on loan to Nesebar, previously on loan at Maritsa)
—	DF	BUL	Georgi Kupenov (to Vitosha Bistritsa, previously on loan at Nesebar)
—	MF	BUL	Zdravko Zhilov (to Lokomotiv GO)
—	MF	BUL	Petar Chalakov (to Lokomotiv GO, previously on loan at Maritsa)

=== Botev Vratsa ===
In:

No.	Pos.	Nation	Player
7	MF	BUL	Georgi Valchev (from Vereya)
14	MF	BUL	Daniel Genov (from (Cyprus) Enosis Neon Paralimni)
18	DF	BUL	Iliya Milanov (Free agent)
20	DF	BUL	Kostadin Gadzhalov (from (Scotland) Dundee)
21	DF	TJK	Iskandar Dzhalilov (from Lokomotiv Plovdiv)
26	DF	BUL	Mariyan Ivanov (from Lokomotiv GO)
30	FW	BUL	Valeri Domovchiyski (from Vereya)
33	GK	BUL	Krasimir Kostov (from Pirin Blagoevgrad)
34	GK	BUL	Nikolay Bankov (from (Poland) Ruch Chorzów)
37	DF	BUL	Ventsislav Kerchev (on loan from Ludogorets)
86	FW	BUL	Valeri Bojinov (from (Croatia) Rijeka)
94	MF	BUL	Yuliyan Nenov (from Dunav Ruse)
—	GK	BUL	Nikolay Krastev (on loan from Levski Sofia)
—	DF	BUL	Mihail Milchev (from Dunav Ruse)
—	DF	BUL	Georgi Kremenliev (from Lokomotiv Plovdiv)
—	MF	BUL	Todor Trayanov (from Pirin Blagoevgrad)

Out:

No.	Pos.	Nation	Player
2	DF	BUL	Alekszandar Petrov (on loan to Lokomotiv Mezdra)
4	DF	BUL	Ivo Harizanov (to Lokomotiv GO)
5	DF	BUL	Kristiyan Grigorov (to Kariana)
7	FW	BUL	Rumen Rangelov (to Lokomotiv Mezdra)
10	FW	BUL	Yanaki Smirnov (to Dobrudzha Dobrich)
11	MF	BUL	Borislav Borisov (released)
13	MF	BUL	Atanas Dimitrov (to Vihren)
14	DF	BUL	Petar Alyoshev (released)
15	MF	BUL	Georgi Yanev (loan return to Levski Sofia)
18	MF	BUL	Atanas Kabov (loan return to Levski Sofia)
22	MF	BUL	Viktor Vasilev (on loan to CSKA 1948)
27	GK	BUL	Aleksandar Lyubenov (loan return to Levski Sofia)
39	DF	BUL	Deyan Ivanov (loan return to Levski Sofia)
—	GK	BUL	Nikolay Krastev (loan return to Levski Sofia)
—	DF	BUL	Mihail Milchev (to Vitosha Bistritsa)
—	DF	BUL	Georgi Kremenliev (to Oborishte)
—	MF	BUL	Todor Trayanov (to Pirin Blagoevgrad)

=== Cherno More ===
In:

No.	Pos.	Nation	Player
4	DF	BUL	Viktor Genev (from (Israel) Ashdod)
7	MF	CPV	Patrick Andrade (from (Portugal) Moreirense)
11	FW	BRA	Jorginho (from (Portugal) Farense)
36	GK	BUL	Georgi Kitanov (on loan from CSKA Sofia)
44	DF	BUL	Ivaylo Markov (from Dunav Ruse)
70	DF	BUL	Plamen Dimov (from Botev Plovdiv)
71	MF	BUL	Vasil Panayotov (from Levski Sofia)
98	FW	BUL	Valentin Yoskov (loan return from Nesebar)

Out:

No.	Pos.	Nation	Player
3	DF	BUL	Ertan Tombak (released)
6	MF	BUL	Aleksandar Tsvetkov (to Beroe)
7	DF	POR	Vitinha (to (Romania) Unirea Alba Iulia)
22	MF	BUL	Mariyan Ognyanov (to CSKA 1948)
27	DF	BUL	Daniel Dimov (to (Turkey) Boluspor)
29	FW	SVK	Marek Kuzma (to (Poland) Puszcza Niepołomice)
36	MF	BUL	Rumen Kasabov (on loan to Chernomorets Balchik)
44	DF	BUL	Ivaylo Markov (on loan to Tsarsko Selo)
45	MF	POR	Fábinho (end of contract)
97	MF	BUL	Nikolay Minkov (to CSKA 1948)
98	FW	BUL	Valentin Yoskov (on loan to Chernomorets Balchik)

=== CSKA Sofia ===
In:

No.	Pos.	Nation	Player
1	GK	CRO	Dante Stipica (from (Croatia) Hajduk Split)
7	MF	GNB	Jorginho (on loan from (France) Saint-Étienne)
9	FW	BRA	Maurides (from (Portugal) Belenenses)
10	FW	BRA	Evandro (from (Brazil) Coritiba)
14	DF	BUL	Angel Lyaskov (loan return from Litex)
16	MF	POR	Janio Bikel (from (Netherlands) NEC)
17	MF	BRA	Henrique (from (Brazil) Atlético Mineiro, previously on loan)
21	FW	BUL	Tonislav Yordanov (loan return from Litex)
22	FW	GAM	Ali Sowe (on loan from (Italy) Chievo)
25	DF	CPV	Steven Pereira (from (Netherlands) Maastricht)
27	DF	SVK	Boris Sekulić (from (Slovakia) Slovan Bratislava)

Out:

No.	Pos.	Nation	Player
7	FW	COL	Jean Carlos Blanco (to (Colombia) Independiente Medellín)
9	FW	BRA	Fernando Karanga (to (China) Henan Jianye)
10	MF	NED	Roland Alberg (to (Greece) Panionios)
12	GK	BUL	Slavi Petrov (on loan to Litex)
14	MF	POR	Ukra (released)
16	MF	CMR	Raoul Loé (to (Cyprus) Omonia)
18	MF	BUL	Aleksandar Georgiev (on loan to Septemvri Sofia)
21	FW	BUL	Tonislav Yordanov (on loan to Litex)
25	DF	FRA	Alexandre Barthe (released)
33	GK	BUL	Georgi Kitanov (on loan to Cherno More)
—	DF	BUL	Ivan Turitsov (on loan to Litex)

=== Dunav ===
In:

No.	Pos.	Nation	Player
2	DF	BRA	Duda (from (Brazil) Grêmio Anápolis)
5	DF	BUL	Georgi Dinkov (from Beroe)
7	MF	BUL	Aleksandar Aleksandrov (from Lokomotiv Sofia)
8	MF	FRA	Samy Ben Aicha (from (France) Tarbes)
9	FW	BUL	Ahmed Ahmedov (from Pomorie)
11	MF	BUL	Daniel Pehlivanov (from Vihren)
12	GK	BUL	Filip Dimitrov (from Tsarsko Selo)
17	MF	BUL	Ivan Kokonov (from Montana)
25	MF	BUL	Borislav Baldzhiyski (from Montana)
94	FW	BRA	Gláucio (from (Brazil) Oeste)
98	MF	BUL	Svetoslav Kovachev (on loan from Ludogorets)
99	MF	GHA	Derrick Mensah (from (Slovenia) NK Aluminij)

Out:

No.	Pos.	Nation	Player
1	GK	BUL	Martin Lukov (to Lokomotiv Plovdiv)
3	DF	BUL	Mario Petkov (to Loko Sofia, previously on loan at Tsarsko Selo)
5	DF	BUL	Ivaylo Markov (to Cherno More)
6	MF	ALG	Nassim Zitouni (to (Algeria) CS Constantine)
7	MF	BUL	Bircent Karagaren (to Lokomotiv Plovdiv)
8	MF	BRA	Jatoba (to (Portugal) Sporting CP)
10	MF	BUL	Vasil Shopov (to Botev Plovdiv)
11	MF	BUL	Diyan Dimov (to CSKA 1948)
16	MF	BUL	Hristo Lemperov (released)
20	FW	BUL	Dimitar Georgiev (to Montana)
22	DF	BUL	Mihail Milchev (to Botev Vratsa)
23	MF	BRA	Esquerdinha (released)
30	GK	BUL	Veselin Dobrev (to Chernomorets Balchik, previously on loan at Kaliakra)
32	MF	BUL	Stefan Mitev (to Oborishte, previously on loan at Loko Ruse)
94	MF	BUL	Yuliyan Nenov (to Botev Vratsa)

=== Etar ===
In:

No.	Pos.	Nation	Player
3	DF	EST	Artjom Artjunin (from (Estonia) Tallinna Kalev)
13	GK	BUL	Anatoli Gospodinov (from (Poland) Chrobry Głogów)
25	DF	BUL	Krum Stoyanov (from (Belarus) Dinamo Minsk)
88	FW	ALB	Flo Bojaj (from Pirin Blagoevgrad)
99	FW	CPV	Gilson Varela (from (Portugal) Espinho)

Out:

No.	Pos.	Nation	Player
4	DF	BUL	Venelin Filipov (to (Lithuania) Žalgiris)
6	DF	BUL	Georgi Pashov (to Ararat-Armenia)
7	MF	BUL	Ivan Valchanov (to Vitosha Bistritsa)
10	DF	SRB	Dušan Mladenović (released)
12	GK	GER	Denis Grgic (released)
23	MF	BUL	Stefan Nedelchev (to Litex)
89	FW	SEN	Alioune Badará (released)

=== Levski Sofia ===
In:

No.	Pos.	Nation	Player
1	GK	SVK	Martin Polaček (from (Czech Republic) Mladá Boleslav)
2	DF	FRA	Louis Nganioni (from (France) Lyon)
5	DF	ISL	Hólmar Eyjólfsson (from (Israel) Maccabi Haifa, previously on loan)
8	MF	SUI	Davide Mariani (from (Switzerland) Lugano)
13	GK	BUL	Nikolay Mihaylov (from (Cyprus) Omonia)
14	MF	EST	Bogdan Vaštšuk (on loan from (Latvia) Riga FC)
22	DF	POR	Nuno Reis (from (Portugal) Vitória F.C.)
23	MF	SEN	Khaly Thiam (from (Hungary) MTK Budapest, previously on loan)
30	FW	BUL	Iliya Dimitrov (loan return from Lokomotiv Sofia)
39	DF	BUL	Deyan Ivanov (loan return from Botev Vratsa)
75	MF	BUL	Aleks Borimirov (loan return from Lokomotiv Sofia)
89	GK	BUL	Nikolay Krastev (loan return from Botev Vratsa)
93	MF	BUL	Atanas Kabov (loan return from Botev Vratsa)
96	FW	BRA	Luan Viana (from (United Arab Emirates) Shabab Al-Ahli)

Out:

No.	Pos.	Nation	Player
8	MF	BUL	Antonio Vutov (loan return to (Italy) Udinese)
13	MF	ESP	Jordi Gómez (to (Cyprus) Omonia)
15	MF	SVK	Roman Procházka (to (Czech Republic) Viktoria Plzeň)
25	DF	POR	Afonso Figueiredo (loan return to (France) Rennes)
30	MF	ROU	Neluț Roșu (to (Romania) Astra Giurgiu)
55	DF	BUL	Georgi Angelov (to Beroe, previously on loan at Vitosha Bistritsa)
71	MF	BUL	Vasil Panayotov (to Cherno More)
88	MF	BUL	Georgi Yanev (to Strumska Slava, previously on loan at Botev Vratsa)
89	GK	BUL	Nikolay Krastev (on loan to Botev Vratsa)
—	GK	BUL	Aleksandar Lyubenov (on loan to Lokomotiv Sofia, previously on loan at Botev Vratsa)
—	DF	BUL	Galin Tashev (to Montana, previously on loan at Lokomotiv Sofia)

=== Lokomotiv Plovdiv ===
In:

No.	Pos.	Nation	Player
9	MF	BUL	Bircent Karagaren (from Dunav Ruse)
12	FW	SVN	Alen Ožbolt (from (Austria) TSV Hartberg)
14	MF	BUL	Dimitar Iliev (from (Poland) Podbeskidzie)
16	MF	CRO	Duje Mrdeša (from (Croatia) Cibalia)
19	MF	BRA	Wiris Gustavo (from (Brazil) Campo Grande)
20	DF	SRB	Miloš Petrović (from (Serbia) Radnički Niš)
25	DF	ARG	Lucas Masoero (from (Argentina) Deportivo Maipú)
44	MF	CRO	Vilim Posinković (from (Poland) Ruch Chorzów)
50	DF	CRO	Josip Tomašević (from (Croatia) Cibalia)
71	GK	BUL	Martin Lukov (from Dunav Ruse)
—	DF	TJK	Iskandar Dzhalilov (from (Russia) Baltika Kaliningrad)
—	DF	BUL	Georgi Kremenliev (from Arda)

Out:

No.	Pos.	Nation	Player
7	MF	BUL	Dimo Bakalov (to Ludogorets)
10	MF	BUL	Veselin Marchev (to Arda)
12	FW	CRO	Filip Mihaljević (to (Poland) Widzew Łódź)
17	MF	MKD	Vančo Trajanov (to Oborishte)
19	DF	BUL	Dimitar Velkovski (to Slavia Sofia)
20	MF	BUL	Dimitar Zakonov (on loan to Arda)
21	DF	CRO	Jurica Buljat (end of contract)
22	GK	CRO	Antoni Milina (released)
23	MF	BUL	Iliya Dzhamov (to Dobrudzha Dobrich)
25	DF	NGA	Musa Muhammed (loan return to (Turkey) İstanbul Başakşehir)
26	DF	BUL	Nikolay Georgiev (on loan to Chernomorets Balchik)
33	GK	BUL	Rosen Andonov (to Tsarsko Selo)
99	DF	BUL	Arhan Isuf (on loan to Arda)
—	DF	TJK	Iskandar Dzhalilov (to Botev Vratsa)
—	DF	BUL	Georgi Kremenliev (to Botev Vratsa)

=== Ludogorets ===
In:

No.	Pos.	Nation	Player
3	DF	BUL	Anton Nedyalkov (from (United States) FC Dallas)
7	MF	BUL	Dimo Bakalov (from Lokomotiv Plovdiv)
9	FW	BRA	Júnior Brandão (from (Brazil) Atlético Goianiense)
11	MF	RSA	May Mahlangu (from (Romania) Dinamo București)
21	DF	ROU	Dragoș Grigore (from (Qatar) Al-Sailiya)
29	GK	BUL	Daniel Naumov (loan return from Vereya)
37	FW	BRA	João Paulo (loan return from Botev Plovdiv)

Out:

No.	Pos.	Nation	Player
19	DF	BUL	Aleksandar Vasilev (to Beroe)
23	DF	BUL	Ventsislav Kerchev (on loan to Botev Vratsa)
32	DF	UKR	Ihor Plastun (to (Belgium) Gent)
93	MF	NED	Virgil Misidjan (to (Germany) 1. FC Nürnberg)
98	MF	BUL	Svetoslav Kovachev (on loan to Dunav Ruse)

=== Septemvri Sofia ===
In:

No.	Pos.	Nation	Player
3	DF	COL	Sergio Castañeda (Free agent)
4	DF	MLI	Alassane Diaby (from (Turkey) Osmanlıspor)
6	DF	ROU	Alexandru Benga (from (Poland) Sandecja Nowy Sącz)
7	MF	BUL	Georgi Rusev (from (Spain) Getafe)
13	MF	BUL	Zdravko Dimitrov (loan return from Lokomotiv Sofia)
23	DF	MKD	Darko Glišić (from (North Macedonia) Vardar)
24	MF	BUL	Aleksandar Georgiev (on loan from CSKA Sofia)

Out:

No.	Pos.	Nation	Player
3	DF	BRA	Victor Luiz (released)
4	DF	BUL	Miki Orachev (released)
5	DF	BUL	Petar Genchev (on loan to CSKA 1948)
6	DF	CPV	Helton Dos Reis (to (Kazakhstan) Ordabasy)
9	FW	BUL	Martin Toshev (to (Lebanon) Al-Ahed)
14	MF	BUL	Yanko Sandanski (to CSKA 1948)
16	MF	BUL	Antoni Ivanov (to (Romania) Gaz Metan Mediaș)
23	MF	BUL	Stanislav Malamov (to Vereya)
24	DF	BUL	Bogomil Dyakov (to CSKA 1948)
30	MF	BUL	Yordan Todorov (on loan to Lokomotiv Sofia)
—	MF	BUL	Aleksandar Bastunov (on loan to Pirin, previously on loan at Nesebar)

=== Slavia Sofia ===
In:

No.	Pos.	Nation	Player
3	DF	BUL	Teynur Marem (from Tsarsko Selo)
5	DF	BUL	Pavel Vidanov (from Beroe)
6	DF	SRB	Nemanja Ivanov (from (Lithuania) Atlantas)
11	MF	BUL	Kristiyan Peshov (from Sozopol)
15	DF	SRB	Aleksandar Stanisavljević (from (Russia) CSKA Moscow II)
19	DF	BUL	Dimitar Velkovski (from Lokomotiv Plovdiv)
22	FW	BUL	Iliyan Mitsanski (Free agent)
37	MF	MKD	Stefan Aškovski (from (Netherlands) Fortuna Sittard)
38	DF	BUL	Milen Gamakov (from (Poland) Lechia Gdańsk)

Out:

No.	Pos.	Nation	Player
5	DF	BUL	Dimitar Burov (on loan to CSKA 1948)
6	DF	BUL	Kostadin Velkov (to (Germany) Chemnitzer FC)
7	FW	BUL	Nasko Milev (to Vitosha Bistritsa)
11	MF	NGA	Chigozie Mbah (released)
13	DF	BUL	Stefan Velkov (to (Netherlands) Den Bosch)
14	FW	BUL	Ivaylo Dimitrov (to (Armenia) Ararat Yerevan)
22	MF	BUL	Vladimir Semerdzhiev (on loan to Tsarsko Selo, previously on loan at Lokomotiv Sofia)
27	MF	BUL	Emil Martinov (to (Azerbaijan) Sabail)
66	DF	KEN	Aboud Omar (to (Belgium) Cercle Brugge)
73	MF	BUL	Ivan Minchev (to Beroe)
77	MF	BUL	Stefan Velev (to (Romania) Sepsi Sfântu Gheorghe)

=== Vereya ===
In:

No.	Pos.	Nation	Player
2	DF	BUL	Georgi Tanev (from Neftochimic)
3	DF	GRE	Theofilos Kouroupis (from (Greece) Rodos)
4	DF	GEO	Goderdzi Machaidze (from (Georgia (country)) Dila Gori)
5	DF	SVK	Tomáš Košút (from (Hungary) Budapest Honvéd)
9	MF	BUL	Stanislav Malamov (from Septemvri Sofia)
11	MF	MNE	Milan Vušurović (from (Latvia) Riga FC)
13	DF	BUL	Emin Ahmed (on loan from Beroe)
15	MF	UKR	Denys Vasilyev (from (Ukraine) Naftovyk-Ukrnafta)
16	MF	FRA	Bilel Ait Malek (from (France) Tarbes Pyrénées)
17	MF	MDA	Andrei Ciofu (from (Greece) Sparta)
18	MF	BUL	Angel Maksimov (from Rilski Sportist)
22	GK	BUL	Bogomil Tsintsarski (from Beroe, previously on loan)
24	MF	BEL	Seydina Diarra (from (Belgium) Eendracht Aalst)
27	GK	BUL	Georgi Georgiev (from Pirin Blagoevgrad)
28	MF	GAB	Alexander N'Doumbou (from (Belgium) FCV Dender EH)
30	MF	BUL	Stefan Alichkov (from Minyor Pernik)
32	MF	BUL	Bedri Ryustemov (from Lokomotiv GO)
33	DF	DEN	Emil Jørgensen (from (Denmark) BK Frem)
77	MF	SVN	Dino Martinović (from (Kazakhstan) Zhetysu)
88	MF	GHA	Michael Tawiah (Free agent)

Out:

No.	Pos.	Nation	Player
1	GK	BUL	Plamen Kolev (to Botev Galabovo)
4	DF	BUL	Plamen Tenev (to Tsarsko Selo)
7	FW	BUL	Georgi Andonov (to Arda)
9	MF	GAB	Ulysse Ndong (to (Qatar) Al-Khor)
11	MF	BUL	Iliyan Yordanov (to Tsarsko Selo)
12	GK	BUL	Daniel Naumov (loan return to Ludogorets)
14	DF	BUL	Veselin Minev (to Tsarsko Selo)
15	DF	BUL	Kostadin Slaev (to CSKA 1948)
16	MF	FRA	Mohamed Chemlal (to (France) Mantes)
17	FW	BUL	Valeri Domovchiyski (to Botev Vratsa)
18	MF	BUL	Georgi Valchev (to Botev Vratsa)
19	MF	BUL	Atanas Panov (released)
20	MF	BUL	Ventsislav Bengyuzov (to Arda)
24	DF	KSA	Hussein Sulaimani (to (Saudi Arabia) Ohod)
26	MF	GER	Savio Nsereko (released)
29	FW	BUL	Ventsislav Hristov (to Arda)

=== Vitosha Bistritsa ===
In:

No.	Pos.	Nation	Player
19	MF	ALB	Andi Renja (from Pirin Blagoevgrad)
22	DF	BUL	Mihail Milchev (from Botev Vratsa)
24	DF	BUL	Georgi Kupenov (from Botev Plovdiv)
33	GK	BUL	Nikolay Radev (loan return from Oborishte)
77	MF	BUL	Ivan Valchanov (from Etar)
96	FW	BUL	Nasko Milev (from Slavia Sofia)
—	DF	BUL	Ivaylo Todorov (from Pirin Blagoevgrad)
—	MF	BUL	Ivaylo Klimentov (on loan from Ludogorets II)

Out:

No.	Pos.	Nation	Player
3	DF	BUL	Yordan Varbanov (retired)
24	DF	BUL	Nikolay Hristozov (retired)
25	DF	BUL	Georgi Angelov (loan return to Levski Sofia)
30	DF	BUL	Iliyan Popov (to Strumska Slava)
66	MF	BUL	Orlin Starokin (to (Cyprus) Alki Oroklini)
77	MF	BUL	Daniel Peev (end of contract)
—	DF	BUL	Ivaylo Todorov (to Lokomotiv GO)
—	MF	BUL	Ivaylo Klimentov (loan return to Ludogorets II)

== Second League ==
=== Arda ===
In:

No.	Pos.	Nation	Player
2	DF	BUL	Milen Stoev (from Vihren)
3	DF	BUL	Rumen Sandev (from Pirin Blagoevgrad)
9	MF	BUL	Veselin Marchev (from Lokomotiv Plovdiv)
13	DF	BUL	Arhan Isuf (on loan from Lokomotiv Plovdiv)
14	FW	BUL	Georgi Andonov (from Vereya)
15	MF	BRA	Lucas Willian (from (Brazil) Rio Branco)
16	FW	BUL	Dimitar Makriev (from (Cyprus) Nea Salamis)
17	MF	BUL	Dimitar Zakonov (on loan from Lokomotiv Plovdiv)
73	MF	BUL	Ventsislav Bengyuzov (from Vereya)
91	FW	BUL	Ventsislav Hristov (from Vereya)

Out:

No.	Pos.	Nation	Player
1	GK	BUL	Hakan Habib (released)
3	DF	BUL	Ahmed Yusein (released)
11	MF	BUL	Atanas Chipilov (to Vihren)
15	DF	BUL	Georgi Chichev (released)
16	MF	BUL	Oldzhay Mehmed (released)
17	FW	BUL	Georgi Stefanov (to Oborishte)
19	DF	BUL	Georgi Kremenliev (to Lokomotiv Plovdiv)
21	MF	BUL	Vladislav Misyak (to Montana)
24	DF	BUL	Iliyan Garov (to Gigant Saedinenie)
55	DF	BUL	Kiril Brestovichki (released)
77	DF	BUL	Beysim Beysim (to Botev Galabovo)

=== Botev Galabovo ===
In:

No.	Pos.	Nation	Player
1	GK	BUL	Plamen Kolev (from Vereya)
6	DF	BUL	Ivelin Ivanov (from Minyor Radnevo)
9	FW	BUL	Metodi Kostov (from Litex)
15	DF	BUL	Beysim Beysim (from Arda)
21	MF	BUL	Simeon Rusev (from Neftochimic)
71	MF	BUL	Halibryam Karmadzha (from Oborishte)
74	MF	BUL	Krasimir Zdravkov (from Hebar)
77	MF	BUL	Rangel Ignatov (from Maritsa Plovdiv)
88	MF	BUL	Svilen Shterev (from Maritsa Plovdiv)
91	GK	BUL	Pavel Kolev (from Rozova Dolina)

Out:

No.	Pos.	Nation	Player
1	GK	ALG	Hossin Lagoun (to (Sweden) AFC Eskilstuna)
6	DF	BUL	Asparuh Smilkov (to Pirin Blagoevgrad)
9	FW	BUL	Redzheb Halil (to Nesebar)
11	MF	BUL	Svetoslav Chitakov (to Gigant Saedinenie)
14	DF	BUL	Stoyan Kizhev (to Pomorie)
15	FW	BUL	Ivan Tsachev (to Nesebar)
21	FW	BUL	Georgi Kirilov (retired)
74	MF	BUL	Bogomil Hristov (to Lokomotiv Sofia)
77	MF	BUL	Dimitar Videv (released)
88	MF	BUL	Dimitar Traykov (released)
91	GK	BUL	Mihail Mihaylov (loan return to Beroe)

=== Chernomorets Balchik ===
In:

No.	Pos.	Nation	Player
4	DF	BUL	Mihail Venkov (from (Kazakhstan) Kyzylzhar)
11	MF	BUL	Rumen Kasabov (on loan from Cherno More)
14	FW	BUL	Valentin Yoskov (on loan from Cherno More)
17	MF	BUL	Yunuz Yunuz (from Ludogorets II)
18	DF	BUL	Nikolay Georgiev (on loan from Lokomotiv Plovdiv)
33	GK	BUL	Veselin Dobrev (from Dunav Ruse)
73	MF	BUL	Todor Palankov (from Pirin Blagoevgrad)
—	MF	BUL	Yanislav Ivanov (from Kariana)

Out:

No.	Pos.	Nation	Player
8	MF	BUL	Zhorzh Dobrev (released)
11	MF	BUL	Viktor Mitev (released)
14	MF	BUL	Valentin Veselinov (to Spartak Varna)
17	DF	BUL	Aleksandar Hardalov (released)
18	FW	BUL	Vasil Kaloyanov (to Tsarsko Selo)
33	GK	BUL	Konstantinos Havales (released)
73	DF	BUL	Stefan Ivanov (to Spartak Varna)
—	MF	BUL	Yanislav Ivanov (to Kariana)

=== CSKA 1948 ===
In:

No.	Pos.	Nation	Player
1	GK	BUL	Diyan Valkov (from Litex)
4	MF	BUL	Nikolay Hristov (from Litex)
5	DF	BUL	Petar Genchev (on loan from Septemvri Sofia)
6	MF	BUL	Diyan Dimov (from Dunav Ruse)
12	DF	BUL	Bogomil Dyakov (from Septemvri Sofia)
15	DF	BUL	Kostadin Slaev (from Vereya)
18	DF	BUL	Apostol Popov (from (Romania) Universitatea Craiova)
20	MF	BUL	Yanko Sandanski (from Septemvri Sofia)
21	MF	BUL	Mariyan Ognyanov (from Cherno More)
27	FW	BUL	Svetoslav Dikov (from Tsarsko Selo)
31	DF	BUL	Dimitar Burov (on loan from Slavia Sofia)
—	MF	BUL	Nikolay Minkov (from Cherno More)
—	MF	BUL	Viktor Vasilev (on loan from Botev Vratsa)
—	MF	BUL	Nikolay Tsvetkov (from Lokomotiv Sofia)
—	FW	BUL	Ventsislav Gyuzelev (from Maritsa Plovdiv)

Out:

No.	Pos.	Nation	Player
6	DF	BUL	Kiril Kotev (retired)
8	FW	BUL	Tsvetelin Tsakovski (to Balkan Botevgrad)
12	GK	BUL	Dragomir Petkov (on loan to Strumska Slava)
20	MF	BUL	Martin Taushanov (to Belasitsa Petrich)
23	MF	BUL	Emil Gargorov (end of contract)
27	DF	BUL	Evgeni Grozdin (released)
29	MF	BUL	Lyubomir Hristov (to Pirin Blagoevgrad)
30	MF	BUL	Mihail Georgiev (to Neftochimic)
76	DF	BUL	Georgi Atanasov (to Chavdar Etropole)
77	MF	BUL	Nikolay Hadzhinikolov (to Hebar)
—	MF	BUL	Nikolay Minkov (released)
—	MF	BUL	Viktor Vasilev (loan return to Botev Vratsa)
—	MF	BUL	Nikolay Tsvetkov (to Montana)
—	FW	BUL	Ventsislav Gyuzelev (released)

=== Dobrudzha ===
In:

No.	Pos.	Nation	Player
5	DF	BUL	Mihail Minkov (from Litex)
14	MF	BUL	Georgi Dimitrov (from Spartak Varna)
15	DF	BUL	Georgi Radev (from Tsarsko Selo)
17	DF	BUL	Todor Kolev (from Montana)
25	MF	BUL	Nikolay Petrov (from Spartak Varna)
26	MF	BUL	Iliya Dzhamov (from Lokomotiv Plovdiv)
27	DF	BUL	Nikolay Nikolaev (from Hebar)
71	FW	BUL	Yanaki Smirnov (from Botev Vratsa)

Out:

No.	Pos.	Nation	Player
14	MF	BUL	Simeon Simeonov (retired)
17	MF	BUL	Emil Stoyanov (to Marek Dupnitsa)
31	MF	BUL	Valentin Slivov (to Gigant Saedinenie)

=== Kariana ===
In:

No.	Pos.	Nation	Player
5	MF	BUL	Yanislav Ivanov (from Chernomorets Balchik)
7	MF	BUL	Ivelin Iliev (from Rozova Dolina)
12	GK	BUL	Stamen Boyadzhiev (from Sozopol)
17	DF	BUL	Stoyan Predev (from Lokomotiv Sofia)
18	MF	BUL	Hristiyan Iliev (on loan from Montana)
30	DF	BUL	Angel Bastunov (from Botev Plovdiv)
73	MF	BUL	Vladimir Michev (from Lokomotiv GO)
—	DF	BUL	Raif Muradov (from Spartak Pleven)
—	DF	BUL	Kristiyan Grigorov (from Botev Vratsa)

Out:

No.	Pos.	Nation	Player
2	DF	BUL	Lyudmil Ivanov (released)
3	DF	BUL	Milen Mladenov (released)
6	MF	BUL	Hristiyan Vasilev (released)
7	MF	BUL	Georgi Tsekov (released)
11	DF	BUL	Stenislav Georgiev (to Oborishte)
12	GK	BUL	Blagoy Stoyanov (to Oborishte)
14	MF	BUL	Yanislav Ivanov (to Chernomorets Balchik)
18	MF	BUL	Yordan Todorov (to Kom)
22	MF	BUL	Borislav Nikiforov (released)
—	DF	BUL	Raif Muradov (released)
—	DF	BUL	Kristiyan Grigorov (released)

=== Litex ===
In:

No.	Pos.	Nation	Player
1	GK	BUL	Dimitar Pantev (from Yantra Gabrovo)
4	MF	BUL	Dzheyhan Zaydenov (from Sozopol)
7	MF	BUL	Tomas Tsvyatkov (from Ludogorets II)
8	MF	BUL	Petar Petrov (from CSKA Sofia U19)
9	FW	BUL	Tonislav Yordanov (on loan from CSKA Sofia)
10	MF	BUL	Georgi Ivanov (from Strumska Slava)
11	DF	BUL	Martin Achkov (on loan from CSKA Sofia)
12	DF	BUL	Galin Minkov (on loan from CSKA Sofia)
15	GK	BUL	Slavi Petrov (on loan from CSKA Sofia)
19	DF	BUL	Daniel Yordanov (from CSKA Sofia U19)
20	MF	BUL	Nikolay Yankov (on loan from CSKA Sofia)
21	MF	BUL	Iliyan Kapitanov (from Oborishte)
23	MF	BUL	Ivan Mitrev (from CSKA Sofia U19)
88	DF	BUL	Ivan Turitsov (from CSKA Sofia, previously on loan)
99	FW	BUL	Radoslav Zhivkov (on loan from CSKA Sofia)
—	MF	BUL	Stefan Nedelchev (from Etar)

Out:

No.	Pos.	Nation	Player
1	GK	BUL	Diyan Valkov (to CSKA 1948)
4	MF	BUL	Nikolay Hristov (to CSKA 1948)
6	DF	BUL	Mihail Minkov (to Dobrudzha Dobrich)
7	MF	BUL	Hristo Kirev (to Strumska Slava)
9	FW	BUL	Metodi Kostov (to Botev Galabovo)
10	FW	BUL	Tonislav Yordanov (loan return to CSKA Sofia)
11	MF	BUL	Emil Petrov (to Pirin Blagoevgrad)
14	MF	BUL	Iskren Pisarov (released)
20	MF	BUL	Ivaylo Radentsov (to Spartak Pleven)
22	DF	BUL	Angel Lyaskov (loan return to CSKA Sofia)
23	MF	BUL	Tihomir Todorov (to Spartak Pleven)
73	MF	BUL	Denis Stoilov (released)

=== Lokomotiv GO ===
In:

No.	Pos.	Nation	Player
4	DF	BUL	Ivo Harizanov (from Botev Vratsa)
5	DF	BUL	Dimitar Kalchev (from Botev Plovdiv)
6	DF	BUL	Tihomir Trifonov (from Sevlievo)
7	MF	BUL	Zdravko Zhilov (from Botev Plovdiv)
8	MF	BUL	Iliya Karapetrov (from Oborishte)
10	FW	BUL	Tihomir Kanev (from Sevlievo)
11	MF	BUL	Krasen Trifonov (from Pavlikeni)
18	MF	BUL	Petar Chalakov (from Botev Plovdiv)
19	MF	BUL	Dimitar Yurukov (from Hebar)
23	DF	BUL	Ivaylo Todorov (from Vitosha Bistritsa)
33	GK	BUL	Simeon Simeonov (from Botev Plovdiv)
77	DF	BUL	Martin Sandov (from Oborishte)
83	DF	BUL	Ivan Penev (from Sozopol)
96	MF	BUL	Kristiyan Kitov (from Ludogorets Razgrad II)

Out:

No.	Pos.	Nation	Player
6	MF	BUL	Petar Kazakov (released)
8	FW	BUL	Georgi Binev (to Chernomorets Burgas)
9	MF	FRA	Cedric Nanitelamio (released)
10	MF	BUL	Bedri Ryustemov (to Vereya)
11	MF	BUL	Tsvetomir Vachev (to Pirin Blagoevgrad)
12	GK	BUL	Ivaylo Krusharski (released)
13	DF	BUL	Veselin Lyubomirov (to Pirin Blagoevgrad)
16	MF	BUL	Vladimir Michev (to Kariana)
17	MF	BUL	Pavel Golovodov (to Bansko)
18	FW	BUL	Deyan Hristov (to Neftochimic)
20	MF	BUL	Yacub Idrizov (to Hebar)
24	MF	BUL	Daniel Vasev (to Lokomotiv Sofia)
26	DF	BUL	Mariyan Ivanov (to Botev Vratsa)
27	MF	BUL	Georgi Chukalov (released)
28	MF	FRA	Kevin Osei (released)
66	MF	BUL	Antoniy Balakov (released)
70	DF	BUL	Kristiyan Dimitrov (to Tsarsko Selo)
77	MF	JPN	Koken Kuroki (released)
91	GK	BUL	Yuliy-Christopher Aleksandrov (released)
93	DF	BUL	Daniel Andreev (to Neftochimic)

=== Lokomotiv Sofia ===
In:

No.	Pos.	Nation	Player
1	GK	BUL	Tsvetomir Vitkov (Free agent)
3	DF	BUL	Mario Petkov (from Dunav Ruse)
4	MF	CMR	Franck Mbarga (Free agent)
6	MF	GRE	Giorgos Bouzoukis (from (Greece) Sparta)
7	FW	BUL	Georgi Netov (from Tsarsko Selo)
9	FW	BUL	Kostadin Hazurov (Free agent)
16	DF	BUL	Ivan Kalaydzhiyski (from Levski Sofia U19)
17	MF	BUL	Yordan Todorov (on loan from Septemvri Sofia)
24	GK	BUL	Aleksandar Lyubenov (on loan from Levski Sofia)
25	MF	SRB	Zoran Švonja (from (Serbia) Bačka Bačka Palanka)
79	FW	MKD	Strahinja Krstevski (from (Serbia) Proleter Novi Sad)
88	MF	BUL	Bogomil Hristov (from Botev Galabovo)
94	MF	BUL	Daniel Vasev (from Lokomotiv GO)

Out:

No.	Pos.	Nation	Player
1	GK	BUL	Kristiyan Katsarev (to Tsarsko Selo)
3	DF	GRE	Konstantinos Manolas (to (Greece) Aittitos Spata)
6	MF	BUL	Vladimir Semerdzhiev (loan return to Slavia Sofia)
7	MF	BUL	Aleksandar Aleksandrov (to Dunav Ruse)
9	FW	BUL	Iliya Dimitrov (loan return to Levski Sofia)
11	MF	BUL	Aleks Borimirov (loan return to Levski Sofia)
13	DF	BUL	Stoyan Predev (to Kariana)
14	MF	BUL	Ivo Ivanov (to Minyor Pernik)
17	DF	BUL	Galin Tashev (loan return to Levski Sofia)
18	MF	BUL	Nikolay Tsvetkov (to CSKA 1948)
20	MF	BUL	Zdravko Dimitrov (loan return to Septemvri Sofia)
66	DF	BUL	Aleksandar Branekov (retired)
92	GK	MKD	Andreja Efremov (released)

=== Ludogorets II ===
In:

No.	Pos.	Nation	Player

Out:

No.	Pos.	Nation	Player
38	MF	BUL	Kristiyan Kitov (to Lokomotiv GO)
45	MF	BUL	Ivaylo Klimentov (on loan to Vitosha Bistritsa)
56	DF	BUL	Ivan Velikov (to Spartak Varna)
74	FW	BUL	Yunuz Yunuz (to Chernomorets Balchik)
85	MF	BUL	Atanas Karachorov (to Spartak Varna)
90	GK	BUL	Ivan Atanasov (to Spartak Varna)
91	FW	BUL	Mehmed Sabri (released)
97	FW	BUL	Tomas Tsvyatkov (to Litex)

=== Montana ===
In:

No.	Pos.	Nation	Player
2	DF	BUL	Vasil Popov (from Oborishte)
4	DF	BUL	Galin Tashev (from Levski Sofia)
8	MF	BUL	Toni Tasev (from Botev Plovdiv, previously on loan)
11	FW	BUL	Dimitar Georgiev (from Dunav Ruse)
14	MF	BUL	Nikola Gavov (on loan from Beroe)
17	MF	BUL	Vladislav Misyak (from Arda)
20	MF	BUL	Dimitar Iliev (from Hebar)
21	DF	BUL	Rumen Trifonov (from Spartak Pleven)
77	MF	BUL	Nikolay Tsvetkov (from CSKA 1948)
—	MF	BUL	Ivaylo Stoyanov (from Strumska Slava)

Out:

No.	Pos.	Nation	Player
6	MF	BUL	Sava Savov (to Svilengrad)
8	MF	BUL	Hristiyan Iliev (on loan to Kariana)
10	MF	BUL	Borislav Baldzhiyski (to Dunav Ruse)
11	MF	BUL	Aleksandar Manolov (to Minyor Pernik)
14	MF	ARM	Sargis Shahinyan (to (Armenia) Alashkert)
17	DF	BUL	Todor Kolev (to Dobrudzha Dobrich)
55	DF	BUL	Kristian Dimitrov (loan return to Botev Plovdiv)
77	MF	BUL	Ivan Kokonov (to Dunav Ruse)
—	MF	BUL	Ivaylo Stoyanov (to Minyor Pernik)

=== Nesebar ===
In:

No.	Pos.	Nation	Player
1	GK	BUL	Pavel Zdravkov (from Tsarsko Selo)
3	DF	BUL	Atanas Tasholov (on loan from Botev Plovdiv)
17	MF	BUL	Dzhuneyt Yashar (from Maritsa Plovdiv)
19	FW	BUL	Redzheb Halil (from Botev Galabovo)
21	FW	BUL	Ivan Tsachev (from Botev Galabovo)

Out:

No.	Pos.	Nation	Player
1	GK	BUL	Martin Dimitrov (loan return to Botev Plovdiv)
3	DF	BUL	Georgi Kupenov (loan return to Botev Plovdiv)
5	MF	BUL	Aleksandar Bastunov (loan return to Septemvri Sofia)
7	FW	BUL	Valentin Yoskov (loan return to Cherno More)
11	MF	BUL	Daniel Benchev (to Chernomorets Burgas)
13	DF	BUL	Hristo Kaymakanski (to Karnobat)
19	MF	BUL	Dimitar Kolarov (to Sozopol)
21	MF	BUL	Emanuil Manev (to Tsarsko Selo)

=== Pirin Blagoevgrad ===
In:

No.	Pos.	Nation	Player
3	DF	BUL	Aleksandar Bastunov (on loan from Septemvri Sofia)
4	MF	BUL	Emil Petrov (from Litex)
6	DF	BUL	Evgeni Tuntev (from Septemvri Simitli)
7	MF	BUL	Lyubomir Hristov (from CSKA 1948)
8	MF	BUL	Milko Georgiev (on loan from Botev Plovdiv)
9	FW	BUL	Vladislav Zlatinov (from Vihren)
10	MF	BUL	Nikola Georgiev (from Oborishte)
14	FW	BUL	Kiril Grozdanov (loan return from Sozopol)
16	MF	BUL	Todor Trayanov (from Botev Vratsa)
20	MF	BUL	Tsvetomir Vachev (from Lokomotiv GO)
27	DF	BUL	Asparuh Smilkov (from Botev Galabovo)
30	DF	BUL	Iliyan Mitrev (from Vihren)
44	DF	BUL	Veselin Lyubomirov (from Lokomotiv GO)
72	GK	BUL	Ivaylo Yanachkov (from Spartak Pleven)

Out:

No.	Pos.	Nation	Player
3	DF	BUL	Rumen Sandev (to Arda)
6	MF	BUL	Todor Palankov (to Chernomorets Balchik)
7	MF	ALB	Andi Renja (to Vitosha Bistritsa)
9	FW	ALB	Flo Bojaj (to Etar)
14	DF	BUL	Ivaylo Todorov (to Vitosha Bistritsa)
19	FW	BUL	Preslav Yordanov (end of contract)
27	DF	BUL	Kostadin Nichev (to Botev Plovdiv)
30	MF	BUL	Todor Trayanov (to Botev Vratsa)
44	MF	IRL	Conor Henderson (end of contract)
72	GK	BUL	Georgi Georgiev (to Vereya)
76	GK	BUL	Krasimir Kostov (to Botev Vratsa)
99	MF	BUL	Radoslav Kirilov (loan return to (Italy) Chievo)

=== Pomorie ===
In:

No.	Pos.	Nation	Player
3	DF	BUL	Todor Taushanov (from Akademik Svishtov)
4	DF	BUL	Stoyan Kizhev (from Botev Galabovo)
20	MF	BUL	Vasil Bozhinov (from Septemvri Simitli)
21	MF	BUL	Teodor Stefanov (from Sozopol)

Out:

No.	Pos.	Nation	Player
4	DF	BUL	Rostislav Petrov (released)
9	FW	BUL	Ahmed Ahmedov (to Dunav Ruse)
20	MF	BUL	Stanislav Dryanov (released)
22	DF	BUL	Aleksandar Georgiev (released)
25	DF	BUL	Slavi Shopov (released)

=== Strumska Slava ===
In:

No.	Pos.	Nation	Player
1	GK	FRA	Hugo Cointard (from (France) Chartres)
11	MF	BUL	Georgi Yanev (from Levski Sofia)
12	GK	BUL	Dragomir Petkov (on loan from CSKA 1948)
16	MF	COL	Juan Alzáte (Free agent)
17	MF	BUL	Hristo Kirev (from Litex)
33	DF	BUL	Dinko Dinev (from Yambol 1915)
88	DF	BUL	Iliyan Popov (from Vitosha Bistritsa)

Out:

No.	Pos.	Nation	Player
1	GK	BUL	Radoslav Kostadinov (to Botev Ihtiman)
9	FW	BUL	Stoyan Georgiev (released)
12	GK	ESP	Carlos Rubio García (released)
13	MF	BUL	Georgi Ivanov (to Litex)
14	MF	NGA	Salas Okechukwu (loan return to Tsarsko Selo)
16	MF	BUL	Ivaylo Stoyanov (to Montana)
77	DF	BUL	Viktor Mitsakov (released)
88	FW	BUL	Georgi Karaneychev (to (Iceland) Einherji)

=== Tsarsko Selo ===
In:

No.	Pos.	Nation	Player
1	GK	BUL	Kristiyan Katsarev (from Lokomotiv Sofia)
2	DF	BUL	Ivaylo Markov (on loan from Cherno More)
4	DF	BUL	Plamen Tenev (from Vereya)
5	DF	SRB	Marko Prljević (from (Armenia) Shirak)
7	DF	BUL	Kristiyan Dimitrov (from Lokomotiv GO)
8	MF	BUL	Nikolay Dyulgerov (from (Israel) Hapoel Marmorek)
12	GK	BUL	Rosen Andonov (from Lokomotiv Plovdiv)
13	FW	BUL	Vasil Kaloyanov (from Chernomorets Balchik)
14	DF	BUL	Veselin Minev (from Vereya)
21	MF	BUL	Emanuil Manev (from Nesebar)
22	MF	BUL	Vladimir Semerdzhiev (on loan from Slavia Sofia)
89	MF	BUL	Iliyan Yordanov (from Vereya)

Out:

No.	Pos.	Nation	Player
1	GK	BUL	Pavel Zdravkov (to Nesebar)
2	DF	BUL	Georgi Radev (to Dobrudzha Dobrich)
3	DF	BUL	Martin Dimov (to Botev Ihtiman)
4	DF	BUL	Teynur Marem (to Slavia Sofia)
5	FW	BUL	Svetoslav Dikov (to CSKA 1948)
6	DF	BUL	Dimitar Ruychev (to Oborishte)
7	FW	BUL	Georgi Netov (to Lokomotiv Sofia)
12	GK	BUL	Filip Dimitrov (to Dunav Ruse)
13	DF	BUL	Galin Minkov (on loan to Litex)
16	MF	BUL	Dimitar Petkov (to Vihren)
20	DF	BUL	Mario Petkov (loan return to Dunav Ruse)
21	MF	BUL	Georgi Korudzhiev (released)
—	MF	NGA	Salas Okechukwu (released, previously on loan at Strumska Slava)
