= List of Bulgarian football transfers winter 2017–18 =

This is a list of Bulgarian football transfers for the 2017–18 winter transfer window. Only transfers involving a team from the two professional leagues, First League and Second League are listed.

== First League ==
=== Beroe ===
In:

| No. | Pos. | Nation | Player |
|---|---|---|---|
| 11 | DF | BUL | Ivan Bandalovski (from (Cyprus) Anorthosis) |
| 18 | MF | POR | Rúben Brígido (from (Cyprus) Nea Salamina) |
| 23 | GK | BUL | Georgi Argilashki (from Vereya) |

Out:

| No. | Pos. | Nation | Player |
|---|---|---|---|
| 1 | GK | BUL | Mihail Mihaylov (on loan to Botev Galabovo) |
| 4 | MF | JPN | Kohei Kato (to (Japan) Sagan Tosu) |
| 19 | DF | BUL | Plamen Tenev (to Vereya) |
| 22 | GK | BUL | Bogomil Tsintsarski (on loan to Vereya) |
| 27 | MF | BUL | Denislav Stanchev (to Vereya) |

=== Botev Plovdiv ===
In:

| No. | Pos. | Nation | Player |
|---|---|---|---|
| 3 | DF | BUL | Dimitar Pirgov (from Levski Sofia) |
| 9 | FW | BRA | Diogo Campos (from (Brazil) Água Santa) |
| 26 | MF | BUL | Milko Georgiev (loan return from Chernomorets Balchik) |
| 28 | DF | BUL | Filip Filipov (from (Cyprus) Ethnikos Achna) |
| 37 | FW | BRA | João Paulo (on loan from Ludogorets) |

Out:

| No. | Pos. | Nation | Player |
|---|---|---|---|
| 2 | DF | BUL | Tsvetomir Panov (to Ludogorets) |
| 5 | DF | BUL | Kristian Dimitrov (on loan to Montana) |
| 9 | FW | BRA | Fernando Viana (to (United Arab Emirates) Al Dhafra) |
| 11 | MF | BUL | Toni Tasev (on loan to Montana) |
| 14 | MF | CIV | Yaya Meledje (to Septemvri Sofia) |
| 25 | DF | BUL | Krum Stoyanov (to (Belarus) Dinamo Minsk) |
| 26 | MF | BUL | Radoslav Apostolov (on loan to Nesebar) |

=== Cherno More ===
In:

| No. | Pos. | Nation | Player |
|---|---|---|---|
| 9 | MF | ALG | Mehdi Fennouche (from Vereya) |
| 10 | FW | BUL | Radoslav Vasilev (from (Cyprus) Alki Oroklini) |
| 16 | MF | BUL | Petar Vitanov (from Vereya) |
| 27 | DF | BUL | Daniel Dimov (from (Turkey) Manisaspor) |
| 33 | DF | BUL | Miroslav Enchev (from Vereya) |
| 38 | MF | COD | Aristote N'Dongala (from Lokomotiv GO) |
| 41 | DF | CGO | Hugo Konongo (from (France) Paulhan Pézenas) |
| 45 | MF | POR | Fábinho (from (Portugal) Sporting B) |
| 88 | GK | BUL | Blagoy Makendzhiev (from Pirin Blagoevgrad) |
| 99 | MF | BUL | Dani Kiki (from Lokomotiv Plovdiv) |

Out:

| No. | Pos. | Nation | Player |
|---|---|---|---|
| 9 | FW | BUL | Tsvetelin Chunchukov (to Slavia Sofia) |
| 11 | FW | FRA | Amadou Soukouna (released) |
| 15 | DF | BUL | Aleksandar Aleksandrov (released) |
| 19 | DF | BUL | Iliya Milanov (end of contract) |
| 33 | GK | BUL | Emil Mihaylov (to CSKA 1948) |
| 66 | MF | BUL | Orlin Starokin (to Vitosha Bistritsa) |
| 73 | DF | CZE | Ondřej Sukup (to (Czech Republic) Zbrojovka Brno) |
| 77 | GK | UKR | Yevhen Borovyk (to (Kazakhstan) Akzhayik) |
| 81 | MF | BUL | Anton Ognyanov (to Vereya) |

=== CSKA Sofia ===
In:

| No. | Pos. | Nation | Player |
|---|---|---|---|
| 3 | DF | BRA | Geferson (from (Brazil) Internacional) |
| 7 | FW | COL | Jean Carlos Blanco (from (Colombia) La Equidad) |
| 8 | MF | GHA | Edwin Gyasi (from (Norway) Aalesunds FK) |
| 10 | MF | NED | Roland Alberg (from (United States) Philadelphia Union) |
| 14 | MF | POR | Ukra (Free agent) |

Out:

| No. | Pos. | Nation | Player |
|---|---|---|---|
| 3 | DF | BUL | Anton Nedyalkov (to (United States) FC Dallas) |
| 7 | MF | ECU | Kevin Mercado (loan return to (Spain) Granada) |
| 10 | MF | COL | Gustavo Culma (to (Mexico) Club Necaxa) |
| 21 | FW | CGO | Kévin Koubemba (to (France) Bourg-en-Bresse) |
| 29 | FW | BUL | Milcho Angelov (to Slavia Sofia) |

=== Dunav ===
In:

| No. | Pos. | Nation | Player |
|---|---|---|---|
| 5 | DF | BUL | Ivaylo Markov (from Lokomotiv Plovdiv) |
| 9 | FW | BUL | Ismail Isa (from Vereya) |
| 15 | DF | BUL | Hristo Lemperov (from Pomorie) |
| 16 | DF | BUL | Martin Kovachev (from (North Macedonia) Pelister) |
| 17 | MF | ALG | Nassim Zitouni (from (France) ASPV Strasbourg) |
| 23 | MF | BRA | Esquerdinha (from (Brazil) Guarany) |
| 27 | FW | SEN | Mouhamadou N'Diaye (from (Norway) Elverum) |
| 99 | FW | BUL | Soner Hyusein (loan return from Lokomotiv Ruse) |
| — | FW | BRA | Luís Cláudio (from (Brazil) Taboão da Serra) |

Out:

| No. | Pos. | Nation | Player |
|---|---|---|---|
| 5 | DF | BUL | Teynur Marem (to Tsarsko Selo) |
| 9 | FW | BUL | Miroslav Budinov (to Septemvri Sofia) |
| 17 | MF | BUL | Andreas Vasev (to Botev Vratsa) |
| 21 | DF | UKR | Oleksiy Larin (released) |
| 23 | DF | BUL | Hristofor Hubchev (to (Greece) Larissa) |
| 30 | GK | BUL | Veselin Dobrev (on loan to Kaliakra) |
| 33 | GK | BUL | Aleksandar Konov (to Oborishte) |
| — | FW | BRA | Luís Cláudio (released) |

=== Etar ===
In:

| No. | Pos. | Nation | Player |
|---|---|---|---|
| 4 | DF | BUL | Venelin Filipov (from (Romania) Voluntari) |
| 6 | DF | BUL | Georgi Pashov (from Lokomotiv Plovdiv) |
| 10 | DF | SRB | Dušan Mladenović (from (Serbia) Dinamo Vranje) |
| 11 | MF | BUL | Daniel Mladenov (from Pirin Blagoevgrad) |
| 12 | GK | GER | Denis Grgic (from (Germany) 1. FC Frickenhausen) |
| 23 | MF | BUL | Stefan Nedelchev (loan return from Botev Galabovo) |
| 25 | MF | GAM | Alasana Manneh (on loan from (Spain) Barcelona B) |
| 70 | MF | MNE | Veljko Batrović (from (Slovenia) Krško) |

Out:

| No. | Pos. | Nation | Player |
|---|---|---|---|
| 6 | MF | BUL | Dzhihat Kyamil (to Arda) |
| 10 | FW | BUL | Todor Kolev (retired) |
| 12 | GK | BUL | Kiril Akalski (to Maritsa Plovdiv) |
| 14 | DF | BUL | Veselin Minev (to Vereya) |
| 24 | DF | BUL | Simeon Ivanov (on loan to Lokomotiv GO) |
| 25 | DF | BUL | Sasho Aleksandrov (to Slavia Sofia) |
| 88 | MF | BUL | Yordan Apostolov (to Botev Vratsa) |
| 91 | FW | BUL | Tsvetomir Todorov (to Kariana) |

=== Levski Sofia ===
In:

| No. | Pos. | Nation | Player |
|---|---|---|---|
| 3 | DF | TUN | Aymen Belaïd (Free agent) |
| 7 | MF | BRA | Paulinho (from (Ukraine) Zorya Luhansk) |
| 10 | FW | BRA | Rivaldinho (from (Romania) Dinamo București) |
| 14 | MF | SEN | Khaly Thiam (on loan from (Hungary) MTK Budapest) |
| 20 | MF | POR | Filipe Nascimento (from (Romania) Dinamo București) |
| 25 | DF | POR | Afonso Figueiredo (on loan from (France) Rennes) |
| 29 | FW | BUL | Stanislav Kostov (from Pirin Blagoevgrad) |
| 89 | GK | BUL | Nikolay Krastev (loan return from Botev Vratsa) |

Out:

| No. | Pos. | Nation | Player |
|---|---|---|---|
| 3 | DF | BUL | Dimitar Pirgov (to Botev Plovdiv) |
| 7 | MF | GHA | Francis Narh (to (Cyprus) Doxa Katokopias) |
| 10 | FW | COD | Junior Mapuku (to (China) Shijiazhuang Ever Bright) |
| 14 | DF | BUL | Miki Orachev (to Septemvri Sofia) |
| 17 | FW | NGA | Tunde Adeniji (to (Kazakhstan) Atyrau) |
| 23 | DF | SWE | Simon Sandberg (to (Sweden) Hammarby) |
| 24 | GK | BUL | Aleksandar Lyubenov (on loan to Botev Vratsa) |
| 55 | DF | BUL | Georgi Angelov (on loan to Vitosha Bistritsa) |
| 75 | MF | BUL | Aleks Borimirov (on loan to Lokomotiv Sofia) |

=== Lokomotiv Plovdiv ===
In:

| No. | Pos. | Nation | Player |
|---|---|---|---|
| 3 | DF | NGA | Mustapha Abdullahi (from (Nigeria) Katsina United) |
| 6 | DF | NGA | Stephen Eze (from (Nigeria) Kano Pillars) |
| 12 | FW | CRO | Filip Mihaljević (Free agent) |
| 21 | DF | CRO | Jurica Buljat (from (Belarus) BATE Borisov) |
| 22 | GK | CRO | Antoni Milina (from (Croatia) NK Župa) |
| 23 | MF | BUL | Iliya Dzhamov (from Oborishte) |
| 33 | GK | BUL | Rosen Andonov (from Oborishte) |
| 61 | MF | BRA | Eliton Junior (Free agent) |
| 77 | FW | CRO | Ante Aralica (from (Croatia) NK Rudeš) |
| 91 | MF | BEL | Abdelhakim Bouhna (Free agent) |

Out:

| No. | Pos. | Nation | Player |
|---|---|---|---|
| 2 | DF | CMR | Marc-Gauthier Bedimé (released) |
| 6 | DF | BUL | Georgi Pashov (to Etar) |
| 9 | MF | BUL | Dani Kiki (to Cherno More) |
| 11 | FW | TUN | Khaled Ayari (to (France) Rodez AF) |
| 20 | MF | POR | Paulo Teles (released) |
| 22 | DF | BUL | Plamen Nikolov (to Litex) |
| 40 | GK | FRA | Mory Diaw (released) |
| 44 | DF | BUL | Ivaylo Markov (to Dunav) |
| 49 | MF | MAR | Rayan Frikeche (released) |
| 71 | DF | BUL | Plamen Krumov (to Arda) |
| 77 | MF | SVN | Dino Martinović (to (Kazakhstan) Zhetysu) |

=== Ludogorets ===
In:

| No. | Pos. | Nation | Player |
|---|---|---|---|
| 25 | DF | BUL | Tsvetomir Panov (from Botev Plovdiv) |
| 70 | FW | POL | Jakub Świerczok (from (Poland) Zagłębie Lubin) |

Out:

| No. | Pos. | Nation | Player |
|---|---|---|---|
| 11 | FW | BRA | Juninho Quixadá (to (Brazil) Ferroviário) |
| 29 | GK | BUL | Daniel Naumov (on loan to Vereya) |
| 37 | FW | BRA | João Paulo (on loan to Botev Plovdiv) |

=== Pirin Blagoevgrad ===
In:

| No. | Pos. | Nation | Player |
|---|---|---|---|
| 9 | FW | ALB | Flo Bojaj (from (England) Walton & Hersham) |
| 11 | MF | BUL | Manol Chapov (Free agent) |
| 14 | DF | BUL | Ivaylo Todorov (from Lokomotiv GO) |
| 19 | FW | BUL | Preslav Yordanov (from (Kazakhstan) Ordabasy) |
| 72 | GK | BUL | Georgi Georgiev (from (Moldova) Dacia Chișinău) |

Out:

| No. | Pos. | Nation | Player |
|---|---|---|---|
| 11 | MF | BUL | Daniel Mladenov (to Etar) |
| 14 | DF | BUL | Stilyan Nikolov (to Septemvri Sofia) |
| 19 | FW | BUL | Stanislav Kostov (to Levski Sofia) |
| 22 | GK | BUL | Blagoy Makendzhiev (to Cherno More) |

=== Septemvri Sofia ===
In:

| No. | Pos. | Nation | Player |
|---|---|---|---|
| 2 | DF | BUL | Stilyan Nikolov (from Pirin Blagoevgrad) |
| 3 | DF | BRA | Victor Luiz (from (Brazil) São Bernardo) |
| 4 | DF | BUL | Miki Orachev (from Levski Sofia) |
| 13 | FW | BUL | Miroslav Budinov (from Dunav) |
| 23 | MF | BUL | Stanislav Malamov (Free agent) |
| 26 | MF | BRA | Fabiano Alves (from (Brazil) Corinthians) |
| 41 | MF | CIV | Yaya Meledje (from Botev Plovdiv) |

Out:

| No. | Pos. | Nation | Player |
|---|---|---|---|
| 2 | DF | BUL | Stoyan Predev (to Lokomotiv Sofia) |
| 3 | DF | AUT | Patrick Wessely (to (Austria) St. Pölten) |
| 4 | DF | BUL | Trayan Trayanov (to Chernomorets Balchik) |
| 11 | MF | BUL | Vladislav Romanov (to Lokomotiv Sofia) |
| 13 | FW | BUL | Vasil Kaloyanov (to Chernomorets Balchik) |
| 16 | MF | BRA | Jean Patric (to (Brazil) Grêmio Anápolis) |
| 23 | DF | BUL | Rumen Trifonov (to Spartak Pleven) |
| — | DF | BUL | Mariyan Dimitrov (to Neftochimic, previously on loan at Tsarsko Selo) |

=== Slavia Sofia ===
In:

| No. | Pos. | Nation | Player |
|---|---|---|---|
| 9 | FW | BUL | Tsvetelin Chunchukov (from Cherno More) |
| 10 | MF | BUL | Yanis Karabelyov (loan return from Tsarsko Selo) |
| 17 | MF | BUL | Momchil Tsvetanov (from (Poland) Stal Mielec) |
| 25 | DF | BUL | Sasho Aleksandrov (from Etar) |
| 29 | FW | BUL | Milcho Angelov (from CSKA Sofia) |
| 71 | MF | BUL | Toni Ivanov (from Ludogorets II) |

Out:

| No. | Pos. | Nation | Player |
|---|---|---|---|
| 4 | DF | BUL | Mihail Venkov (to (Kazakhstan) Kyzylzhar) |
| 5 | MF | GAB | Ulysse Ndong (to Vereya) |
| 19 | FW | BUL | Kaloyan Krastev (to (Italy) Bologna) |
| 22 | FW | MLI | Souleymane Traore (released) |
| 24 | DF | BRA | Matheus Bissi (released) |
| 33 | FW | BUL | Kitan Vasilev (on loan to Tsarsko Selo, previously on loan at Vitosha) |
| 99 | GK | BUL | Martin Velichkov (on loan to Strumska Slava) |

=== Vereya ===
In:

| No. | Pos. | Nation | Player |
|---|---|---|---|
| 4 | DF | BUL | Plamen Tenev (from Beroe) |
| 8 | MF | BUL | Anton Ognyanov (from Cherno More) |
| 9 | MF | GAB | Ulysse Ndong (from Slavia Sofia) |
| 12 | GK | BUL | Daniel Naumov (on loan from Ludogorets) |
| 14 | DF | BUL | Veselin Minev (from Etar) |
| 16 | MF | FRA | Mohamed Chemlal (Free agent) |
| 18 | MF | BUL | Georgi Valchev (Free agent) |
| 22 | GK | BUL | Bogomil Tsintsarski (on loan from Beroe) |
| 26 | MF | GER | Savio Nsereko (Free agent) |
| 29 | FW | BUL | Ventsislav Hristov (from (Russia) SKA-Khabarovsk) |
| 33 | MF | BUL | Denislav Stanchev (from Beroe) |
| 87 | MF | BUL | Simeon Mechev (Free agent) |

Out:

| No. | Pos. | Nation | Player |
|---|---|---|---|
| 4 | DF | TUN | Selim Ben Djemia (to (Greece) Lamia) |
| 8 | MF | GUI | Ousmane Baldé (released) |
| 9 | MF | ALG | Mehdi Fennouche (to Cherno More) |
| 12 | GK | BUL | Georgi Stavrev (to Spartak Varna) |
| 14 | MF | KAZ | Yerkebulan Nurgaliyev (to (Kazakhstan) Akzhayik) |
| 16 | MF | BUL | Petar Vitanov (to Cherno More) |
| 18 | MF | BUL | Yanislav Ivanov (to Kariana) |
| 22 | MF | ESP | David González (released) |
| 26 | MF | FRA | Salim Kerkar (to (Kuwait) Burgan SC) |
| 29 | FW | BUL | Ismail Isa (to Dunav Ruse) |
| 33 | DF | BUL | Miroslav Enchev (to Cherno More) |
| 96 | GK | BUL | Georgi Argilashki (to Beroe) |

=== Vitosha Bistritsa ===
In:

| No. | Pos. | Nation | Player |
|---|---|---|---|
| 12 | GK | BUL | Nikolay Georgiev (Free agent) |
| 25 | DF | BUL | Georgi Angelov (on loan from Levski Sofia) |
| 66 | MF | BUL | Orlin Starokin (from Cherno More) |
| 80 | MF | BUL | Lachezar Kotev (loan return from Oborishte) |

Out:

| No. | Pos. | Nation | Player |
|---|---|---|---|
| 1 | GK | BUL | Mihail Ivanov (to (Sweden) AFC Eskilstuna) |
| 16 | MF | BUL | Dimitar Pantaleev (on loan to Oborishte) |
| 25 | FW | NGA | Paul Otofe (released) |
| 33 | GK | BUL | Nikolay Radev (on loan to Oborishte) |
| 80 | FW | BUL | Kitan Vasilev (loan return to Slavia Sofia) |

== Second League ==
=== Botev Galabovo ===
In:

| No. | Pos. | Nation | Player |
|---|---|---|---|
| 1 | GK | ALG | Hossin Lagoun (from (Algeria) RC Arbaâ) |
| 6 | DF | BUL | Asparuh Smilkov (from Tsarsko Selo) |
| 11 | MF | BUL | Svetoslav Chitakov (from Maritsa) |
| 19 | FW | BUL | Rangel Abushev (from Minyor Pernik) |
| 69 | DF | BUL | Ivaylo Angelov (from (Italy) Latina) |
| 77 | MF | BUL | Dimitar Videv (from Vereya II) |
| 91 | GK | BUL | Mihail Mihaylov (on loan from Beroe) |
| — | MF | BUL | Ivan Toshev (from Botev Vratsa) |

Out:

| No. | Pos. | Nation | Player |
|---|---|---|---|
| 6 | MF | BUL | Antonio Georgiev (to Tsarsko Selo) |
| 11 | MF | BUL | Iliyan Kapitanov (to Oborishte) |
| 18 | DF | BUL | Emil Kolev (to Oborishte) |
| 28 | MF | BUL | Kristiyan Georgiev (to Dobrudzha) |
| 31 | GK | BUL | Marin Orlinov (to Montana) |
| 77 | MF | BUL | Stefan Nedelchev (loan return to Etar) |

=== Botev Vratsa ===
In:

| No. | Pos. | Nation | Player |
|---|---|---|---|
| 2 | DF | BUL | Alekszandar Petrov (from Ludogorets U19) |
| 7 | FW | BUL | Rumen Rangelov (from Kariana) |
| 8 | MF | BUL | Petar Atanasov (from Montana) |
| 9 | FW | BUL | Ivan Kolev (from Nesebar) |
| 15 | MF | BUL | Georgi Yanev (on loan from Levski Sofia) |
| 22 | MF | BUL | Andreas Vasev (from Dunav) |
| 27 | GK | BUL | Aleksandar Lyubenov (on loan from Levski Sofia) |
| 88 | MF | BUL | Yordan Apostolov (from Etar) |

Out:

| No. | Pos. | Nation | Player |
|---|---|---|---|
| 2 | DF | BUL | Dimitar Todorov (to Neftochimic) |
| 7 | FW | BUL | Aleksandar Aleksandrov (to Pirin Razlog) |
| 8 | MF | BUL | Ivan Toshev (to Botev Galabovo) |
| 9 | FW | BUL | Todor Chavorski (to Oborishte) |
| 21 | MF | BUL | Iliya Karapetrov (to Oborishte) |
| 33 | GK | BUL | Nikolay Krastev (loan return to Levski Sofia) |

=== Chernomorets Balchik ===
In:

| No. | Pos. | Nation | Player |
|---|---|---|---|
| 17 | DF | BUL | Aleksandar Hardalov (from Zagorets) |
| 18 | FW | BUL | Vasil Kaloyanov (from Septemvri Sofia) |
| 92 | DF | BUL | Trayan Trayanov (from Septemvri Sofia) |

Out:

| No. | Pos. | Nation | Player |
|---|---|---|---|
| 6 | MF | BUL | Milko Georgiev (loan return to Botev Plovdiv) |
| 13 | DF | BUL | Raif Muradov (to Spartak Pleven) |
| 17 | MF | TJK | Nozim Babadjanov (to (Tajikistan) Istiklol) |
| 22 | MF | BUL | Beadir Beadirov (to Dobrudzha) |
| 92 | MF | BUL | Georgi Dimitrov (to Spartak Varna) |

=== Litex ===
In:

| No. | Pos. | Nation | Player |
|---|---|---|---|
| 18 | DF | BUL | Denislav Mitsakov (from Strumska Slava) |
| 33 | DF | BUL | Plamen Nikolov (from Lokomotiv Plovdiv) |
| 73 | MF | BUL | Denis Stoilov (from Lokomotiv Sofia) |
| 77 | FW | BUL | Kristiyan Tafradzhiyski (from Sozopol) |

Out:

| No. | Pos. | Nation | Player |
|---|---|---|---|
| 8 | MF | BUL | Konstantin Genkov (to Vihar Slavyanovo) |
| 73 | MF | BUL | Dilyan Dimitrov (to Vihar Slavyanovo) |
| 99 | FW | BUL | Tihomir Kanev (to Sevlievo) |

=== Lokomotiv GO ===
In:

| No. | Pos. | Nation | Player |
|---|---|---|---|
| 8 | FW | BUL | Georgi Binev (from Neftochimic) |
| 9 | MF | FRA | Cedric Nanitelamio (from (Andorra) Ordino) |
| 11 | MF | BUL | Tsvetomir Vachev (from Slivnishki Geroy) |
| 14 | GK | BUL | Evgeni Aleksandrov (from Montana) |
| 15 | DF | BUL | Simeon Ivanov (on loan from Etar) |
| 19 | MF | BUL | Georgi Kolev (from Dobrudzha) |
| 24 | MF | BUL | Daniel Vasev (from Montana) |
| 77 | MF | JPN | Koken Kuroki (Free agent) |
| 93 | DF | BUL | Daniel Andreev (from Sozopol) |

Out:

| No. | Pos. | Nation | Player |
|---|---|---|---|
| 1 | GK | BUL | Kristiyan Katsarev (to Lokomotiv Sofia) |
| 8 | FW | BUL | Aleksandar Kirov (released) |
| 14 | DF | BUL | Ivaylo Todorov (to Pirin Blagoevgrad) |
| 19 | DF | BUL | Milen Savov (to Sevlievo) |
| 24 | MF | COD | Aristote N'Dongala (to Cherno More) |
| 93 | FW | BUL | Dimitar Baydakov (to Sevlievo) |

=== Lokomotiv Sofia ===
In:

| No. | Pos. | Nation | Player |
|---|---|---|---|
| 1 | GK | BUL | Kristiyan Katsarev (from Lokomotiv GO) |
| 3 | DF | GRE | Konstantinos Manolas (from (Greece) Levadiakos) |
| 8 | MF | ALG | Ismaël Taïder (from (Romania) Soimii Pancota) |
| 11 | MF | BUL | Aleks Borimirov (on loan from Levski Sofia) |
| 13 | DF | BUL | Stoyan Predev (from Septemvri Sofia) |
| 21 | DF | GRE | Christos Kontochristos (from (Greece) Panegialios) |
| 88 | MF | BUL | Vladislav Romanov (from Septemvri Sofia) |

Out:

| No. | Pos. | Nation | Player |
|---|---|---|---|
| 3 | DF | BUL | Evgeni Zyumbulev (to CSKA 1948) |
| 8 | MF | BUL | Stoyan Kadifchin (to Minyor Pernik) |
| 11 | MF | BUL | Denis Stoilov (to Litex) |
| 16 | DF | BUL | Vasil Popov (to Oborishte) |
| 21 | DF | BUL | Viktor Raychev (to Minyor Pernik) |
| 24 | GK | BUL | Ivaylo Yanachkov (to Spartal Pleven) |
| 28 | FW | GRE | Efthymios Gamagas (released) |

=== Ludogorets Razgrad II ===
In:

| No. | Pos. | Nation | Player |

Out:

| No. | Pos. | Nation | Player |
|---|---|---|---|
| 81 | MF | BUL | Toni Ivanov (to Slavia Sofia) |

=== Maritsa Plovdiv ===
In:

| No. | Pos. | Nation | Player |
|---|---|---|---|
| 6 | DF | BUL | Yordan Hristov (from (Cyprus) Ermis Aradippou) |
| 12 | GK | BUL | Kiril Akalski (from Etar) |
| 21 | DF | BUL | Plamen Tabakov (Free agent) |

Out:

| No. | Pos. | Nation | Player |
|---|---|---|---|
| 5 | DF | BUL | Samer Alhusein (retired) |
| 6 | DF | BUL | Tsvetan Yotov (released) |
| 11 | FW | BUL | Ivan Gendov (to Rakovski) |
| 15 | MF | BUL | Svetoslav Chitakov (to Botev Galabovo) |
| 21 | MF | BUL | Hristo Yanchev (to Borislav Parvomay) |

=== Montana ===
In:

| No. | Pos. | Nation | Player |
|---|---|---|---|
| 1 | GK | BUL | Marin Orlinov (from Botev Galabovo) |
| 6 | MF | BUL | Sava Savov (from Parva Atomna) |
| 7 | MF | BUL | Aykut Ramadan (from Minyor Pernik) |
| 14 | MF | ARM | Sargis Shahinyan (from (Armenia) Gandzasar Kapan) |
| 18 | MF | BUL | Toni Tasev (from Botev Plovdiv) |
| 55 | DF | BUL | Kristian Dimitrov (on loan from Botev Plovdiv) |

Out:

| No. | Pos. | Nation | Player |
|---|---|---|---|
| 1 | GK | BUL | Evgeni Aleksandrov (to Lokomotiv GO) |
| 2 | DF | BUL | Mario Blagoev (to Dobrudzha) |
| 4 | MF | BUL | Daniel Vasev (to Lokomotiv GO) |
| 6 | DF | FRA | Birahim Sarr (to (Sweden) Västerås SK) |
| 10 | MF | BUL | Petar Atanasov (to Botev Vratsa) |
| 15 | FW | BUL | Aleksandar Veselinov (to Kariana) |

=== Neftochimic ===
In:

| No. | Pos. | Nation | Player |
|---|---|---|---|
| 11 | DF | BUL | Stoyko Ivanov (from Septemvri Simitli) |
| 13 | DF | BUL | Dimitar Todorov (from Botev Vratsa) |
| 17 | MF | BUL | Steven Slavkov (from Vihren) |
| 22 | MF | BUL | Tsvetomir Tsonkov (from Oborishte) |
| 71 | DF | BUL | Mariyan Dimitrov (from Septemvri Sofia) |
| 96 | GK | BUL | Ferdi Myumyunov (from Minyor Pernik) |

Out:

| No. | Pos. | Nation | Player |
|---|---|---|---|
| 5 | DF | BUL | Nikola Avdzhiev (retired) |
| 6 | DF | BUL | Ivan Stoyanov (to Sozopol) |
| 7 | FW | BUL | Georgi Binev (to Lokomotiv GO) |
| 9 | FW | CHN | Liu Ziming (loan return to (China) Shijiazhuang) |
| 12 | GK | BUL | Hristiyan Slavov (to Karnobat) |
| 13 | DF | BUL | Dimitar Valev (to Tsarevo) |
| 14 | FW | BUL | Martin Ivanov (released) |
| 19 | DF | BUL | Yasen Tuzakov (to Chernomorets Burgas) |
| 22 | MF | BUL | Halibryam Karmadzha (to Oborishte) |
| 89 | DF | BUL | Andrey Kazaliev (released) |

=== Nesebar ===
In:

| No. | Pos. | Nation | Player |
|---|---|---|---|
| 6 | MF | BUL | Radoslav Apostolov (on loan from Botev Plovdiv) |
| 9 | FW | BUL | Trayo Grozev (from (Malta) Kerċem Ajax) |
| 13 | DF | BUL | Hristo Kaymakanski (from Sozopol) |
| 15 | MF | BUL | Borimir Karamfilov (from Oborishte) |
| 33 | GK | BUL | Petko Patsov (from Pomorie) |

Out:

| No. | Pos. | Nation | Player |
|---|---|---|---|
| 9 | FW | BUL | Ivan Kolev (to Botev Vratsa) |
| 11 | MF | BUL | Stamen Angelov (retired) |
| 17 | MF | BUL | Stoyan Valchev (released) |
| 19 | MF | BUL | Dimitar Kolarov (released) |
| 33 | GK | BUL | Stamen Boyadzhiev (to Sozopol) |

=== Oborishte ===
In:

| No. | Pos. | Nation | Player |
|---|---|---|---|
| 1 | GK | BUL | Nikolay Radev (on loan from Vitosha Bistritsa) |
| 8 | MF | BUL | Iliya Karapetrov (from Botev Vratsa) |
| 9 | FW | BUL | Todor Chavorski (from Botev Vratsa) |
| 11 | MF | BUL | Iliyan Kapitanov (from Botev Galabovo) |
| 15 | MF | BUL | Kristiyan Slavov (from Vereya II) |
| 16 | MF | BUL | Dimitar Pantaleev (on loan from Vitosha Bistritsa) |
| 19 | MF | BUL | Lachezar Angelov (from Levski Karlovo) |
| 21 | DF | BUL | Emil Kolev (from Botev Galabovo) |
| 23 | DF | BUL | Vasil Popov (from Lokomotiv Sofia) |
| 27 | DF | BUL | David Stoyanov (from CSKA 1948) |
| 73 | GK | BUL | Aleksandar Konov (from Dunav Ruse) |
| 77 | MF | BUL | Halibryam Karmadzha (from Neftochimic) |
| 90 | FW | BUL | Georgi Bozhilov (from Germanea) |

Out:

| No. | Pos. | Nation | Player |
|---|---|---|---|
| 1 | GK | BUL | Ivan Ivanov (to Dobrudzha) |
| 8 | DF | BUL | Mike Krastev (to Minyor Pernik) |
| 9 | MF | BUL | Borimir Karamfilov (to Nesebar) |
| 11 | FW | BUL | Georgi Netov (to Tsarsko Selo) |
| 13 | FW | BUL | Kostadin Adzhov (to Rilski Sportist) |
| 15 | MF | BUL | Petar Tonchev (to (Greece) Asteras Vlachioti) |
| 17 | FW | BUL | Eray Karadayi (to Arda) |
| 22 | MF | BUL | Tsvetomir Tsonkov (to Neftochimic) |
| 24 | MF | BUL | Iliya Dzhamov (to Lokomotiv Plovdiv) |
| 27 | FW | BRA | Jacó (to (Brazil) Anapolina) |
| 73 | GK | BUL | Rosen Andonov (to Lokomotiv Plovdiv) |
| 80 | MF | BUL | Lachezar Kotev (loan return to Vitosha Bistritsa) |
| 90 | DF | BUL | Dimitar Ruychev (to Tsarsko Selo) |

=== Pomorie ===
In:

| No. | Pos. | Nation | Player |
|---|---|---|---|
| 6 | DF | BUL | Ivan Yanchev (from Sozopol) |
| 21 | FW | BUL | Aleko Hristov (from (Germany) MTV 1862 Pfaffenhofen) |
| 22 | DF | BUL | Aleksandar Georgiev (from Pirin GD) |
| 30 | GK | BUL | Martin Temenliev (from Sozopol) |

Out:

| No. | Pos. | Nation | Player |
|---|---|---|---|
| 1 | GK | BUL | Petko Patsov (to Nesebar) |
| 10 | MF | BUL | Kiril Georgiev (to Hebar) |
| 11 | MF | BUL | Deyan Lozev (to Arda) |
| 22 | DF | BUL | Hristo Lemperov (to Dunav Ruse) |

=== Sozopol ===
In:

| No. | Pos. | Nation | Player |
|---|---|---|---|
| 1 | GK | BUL | Stamen Boyadzhiev (from Nesebar) |
| 7 | FW | BUL | Spas Spasov (from CSKA 1948) |
| 8 | MF | BUL | Teodor Stefanov (from Hebar) |
| 14 | DF | BUL | Ivan Stoyanov (from Neftochimic) |
| 22 | DF | BUL | Miroslav Ivanov (from Minyor Pernik) |
| 31 | DF | BUL | Petar Kyumurdzhiev (from (Malta) Kerċem Ajax) |
| 77 | FW | FRA | Gil Lawson (from Pirin Razlog) |
| 88 | MF | BUL | Martin Gaziev (from Pirin Razlog) |

Out:

| No. | Pos. | Nation | Player |
|---|---|---|---|
| 2 | DF | BUL | Kostadin Stoyanov (released) |
| 3 | DF | BUL | Ivan Yanchev (to Pomorie) |
| 7 | FW | BUL | Kristiyan Tafradzhiyski (to Litex) |
| 8 | FW | BUL | Georgi Petrov (end of contract) |
| 13 | DF | BUL | Hristo Kaymakanski (to Nesebar) |
| 14 | DF | BUL | Martin Sechkov (to Hebar) |
| 17 | MF | BUL | Diyan Hadzhiev (released) |
| 22 | MF | BUL | Stanimir Mitev (to Chernomorets Burgas) |
| 30 | GK | BUL | Martin Temenliev (to Pomorie) |
| 32 | DF | BUL | Daniel Andreev (to Lokomotiv GO) |
| 55 | MF | BUL | Mihail Georgiev (to CSKA 1948) |

=== Strumska Slava ===
In:

| No. | Pos. | Nation | Player |
|---|---|---|---|
| 4 | DF | BUL | Yuliyan Chapaev (Free agent) |
| 12 | GK | ESP | Carlos García (from (United States) Ohio Valley University) |
| 14 | MF | NGA | Salas Okechukwu (on loan from Tsarsko Selo) |
| 23 | MF | BUL | Lyubomir Tanev (from Belasitsa Petrich) |
| 77 | DF | BUL | Viktor Mitsakov (from Vihren) |
| 88 | FW | BUL | Georgi Karaneychev (from (Iceland) KF Fjarðabyggðar) |
| 99 | GK | BUL | Martin Velichkov (on loan from Slavia Sofia) |

Out:

| No. | Pos. | Nation | Player |
|---|---|---|---|
| 3 | DF | BUL | Samet Ashimov (retired) |
| 4 | MF | BUL | Georgi Yanev (loan return to Levski Sofia) |
| 12 | GK | BUL | Kristian Donchev (released) |
| 14 | FW | BUL | Marian Hadzhiev (to Slivnishki Geroy) |
| 23 | MF | BUL | Kristiyan Evgeniev (released) |
| 84 | DF | BUL | Denislav Mitsakov (to Litex) |
| 88 | FW | BUL | Petar Dimitrov (released) |

=== Tsarsko Selo ===
In:

| No. | Pos. | Nation | Player |
|---|---|---|---|
| 4 | DF | BUL | Teynur Marem (from Dunav Ruse) |
| 6 | DF | BUL | Dimitar Ruychev (from Oborishte) |
| 7 | FW | BUL | Georgi Netov (from Oborishte) |
| 9 | MF | BUL | Antonio Georgiev (from Botev Galabovo) |
| 11 | FW | BUL | Kitan Vasilev (on loan from Slavia Sofia) |

Out:

| No. | Pos. | Nation | Player |
|---|---|---|---|
| 4 | DF | BUL | Asparuh Smilkov (to Botev Galabovo) |
| 7 | MF | BUL | Krasimir Iliev (to Arda) |
| 10 | MF | BUL | Yanis Karabelyov (loan return to Slavia Sofia) |
| 11 | MF | NGA | Salas Okechukwu (on loan to Strumska Slava) |
| 20 | DF | BUL | Martin Mitov (to Spartak Pleven) |
| 21 | DF | BUL | Mariyan Dimitrov (loan return to Septemvri Sofia) |
