= Yordan Todorov =

Yordan Todorov may refer to:

- Yordan Todorov (footballer, born July 1981), Bulgarian footballer for ESV Regensburg
- Yordan Todorov (footballer, born November 1981), Bulgarian footballer for Kom
- Yordan Todorov (footballer, born 1999), Bulgarian footballer for Lokomotiv Sofia on loan from Septemvri Sofia
