= Nikola Gavov =

Bulgarian footballer

Personal information
- Full name: Nikola Hristov Gavov
- Date of birth: 19 March 1999 (age 27)
- Place of birth: Kotel, Bulgaria
- Height: 1.78 m (5 ft 10 in)
- Position: Midfielder

Team information
- Current team: Rodopa Smolyan
- Number: 21

Youth career
- –2016: Litex
- 2016–2018: Beroe

Senior career*
Years	Team	Apps	(Gls)
2017–2020	Beroe	4	(0)
2018–2019	→ Montana (loan)	13	(0)
2019–2020	→ Minyor Radnevo (loan)	9	(0)
2020	Nesebar		
2020–2021	Syrianska		
2021	Nesebar		
2021	Botev Vratsa	2	(0)
2021–2022	Levski Lom	13	(0)
2023–2025	Nesebar	71	(17)
2025–	Rodopa Smolyan	0	(0)

International career
2015–2016	Bulgaria U17	2	(0)
- * Club domestic league appearances and goals as of 1 June 2019

Nikola Gavov (Bulgarian: Никола Гавов; born 19 March 1999) is a Bulgarian footballer who currently plays as a midfielder for Botev Vratsa.

== Career ==
=== Beroe Stara Zagora ===
In the summer of 2016 he moved from Litex Lovech to Beroe Stara Zagora. He made his official debut for the team on 11 May 2017 against Neftochimic.

In June 2018, Gavov was sent on loan to Second League club Montana.

== Career statistics ==
=== Club ===
As of 12 February 2017

Club performance			League		Cup		Continental		Other		Total	
Club	League	Season	Apps	Goals	Apps	Goals	Apps	Goals	Apps	Goals	Apps	Goals
Bulgaria			League		Bulgarian Cup		Europe		Other (Note: Includes Bulgarian Supercup matches.)		Total	
Beroe Stara Zagora	First League	2016–17	1	0	0	0	–		–		1	0
Beroe Stara Zagora	Total		1	0	0	0	0	0	0	0	1	0
Career statistics			1	0	0	0	0	0	0	0	1	0
