= Dimitar Baydakov =

Bulgarian footballer

Personal information
- Full name: Dimitar Krasimirov Baydakov
- Date of birth: 15 February 1993 (age 33)
- Place of birth: Veliko Tarnovo, Bulgaria
- Height: 1.76 m (5 ft 9 in)
- Position: Forward

Team information
- Current team: Sevlievo

Senior career*
| Years | Team | Apps | (Gls) |
| 2012–2013 | Etar 1924 | 4 | (0) |
| 2013–2015 | Etar | 45 | (29) |
| 2015–2016 | Lokomotiv GO | 25 | (4) |
| 2016–2017 | Lyubimets | – | (–) |
| 2017 | Lokomotiv GO | 6 | (0) |
| 2018 | Sevlievo | 25 | (9) |
| 2019 | Minyor Radnevo | 13 | (4) |
| 2019–2021 | Etar II | 23 | (18) |
| 2020–2021 | Etar | 0 | (0) |
| 2021–2024 | Lokomotiv GO | ? | (39) |
| 2024– | Sevlievo | 0 | (0) |
- * Club domestic league appearances and goals as of 16 July 2024

Dimitar Baydakov (Bulgarian: Димитър Байдаков; born 15 February 1993) is a Bulgarian professional footballer who plays as a forward for Sevlievo.

== Career ==
On 1 September 2016, Baydakov joined Lyubimets. He was supposed to sign with Sevlievo in July 2017 but actually joined his former club Lokomotiv Gorna Oryahovitsa.
