= Bedri Ryustemov =

Bulgarian footballer

Personal information
- Full name: Bedri Reyhatov Ryustemov
- Date of birth: 17 November 1995 (age 30)
- Place of birth: Veliko Tarnovo, Bulgaria
- Height: 1.85 m (6 ft 1 in)
- Positions: Attacking midfielder; forward

Youth career
- Etar
- Etar 1924
- –2006: Bali Debelets
- 2006–2011: Pieta Hotspurs
- 2011–2013: Lazio
- 2012–2013: → Città di Marino (loan)
- 2013–2014: Novara

Senior career*
Years	Team	Apps	(Gls)
2014–2015	Pro Patria	0	(0)
2015–2016	Lleida Esportiu	0	(0)
2016	→ Llosetense (loan)	11	(0)
2016–2017	Atlético Saguntino	6	(0)
2017–2018	Lokomotiv GO	23	(2)
2018–2019	Vereya	16	(0)

International career
2016	Bulgaria U21	4	(0)
- * Club domestic league appearances and goals as of 8 May 2019

Bedri Ryustemov (Bulgarian: Бедри Рюстемов; born 17 November 1995) is a Bulgarian footballer who plays as a midfielder.

== Career ==
=== Yourth career ===
Born in Veliko Tarnovo, Ryustemov began his career at the local clubs Etar and Etar 1924. He later moved to Bali Debelets, before moving to Malta and joining Pieta Hotspurs. 5 years later he joined Lazio Academy and was loaned to Città di Marino.

In 2013, he joined another Italian team - Novara. А year later he signed with Pro Patria.

In 2015, he moved to Spain, joining Lleida Esportiu and was later sent on loan to Llosetense. In September 2016 he signed with the Spanish team Atlético Saguntino, receiving the number 15 shirt.

=== Lokomotiv Gorna Oryahovitsa ===
On 17 February 2017 Ryustemov returned to Bulgaria to join Lokomotiv GO. He made his debut in the First League for Lokomotiv on 2 April 2017 in a 5–0 win against Vereya, coming on as a substitute in the 86th minute.

=== Vereya ===
On 2 October he signed a contract with the Bulgarian First League team Vereyajoining as a free agent.

== International career ==
=== Youth levels ===
Ryustemov was called up for Bulgaria U21 on 31 May 2016 for the friendly matches against Cyprus U21 and Norway U21. He played in both matches.

== Career statistics ==
=== Club ===
As of 25 May 2018

Club performance			League		Cup		Continental		Other		Total	
Club	League	Season	Apps	Goals	Apps	Goals	Apps	Goals	Apps	Goals	Apps	Goals
Llosetense (loan)	Segunda B	2015–16	11	0	0	0	–		–		11	0
Llosetense (loan)	Total		11	0	0	0	0	0	0	0	11	0
Atlético Saguntino	Segunda B	2016–17	0	0	0	0	–		–		0	0
Atlético Saguntino	Total		0	0	0	0	0	0	0	0	0	0
Lokomotiv GO	First League	2016–17	1	0	0	0	–		2 (Note: Includes Bulgarian Supercup matches.)	0	3	0
Lokomotiv GO	Second League	2017–18	20	2	1	0	–		–		21	2
Lokomotiv GO	Total		21	2	1	0	0	0	2	0	24	2
Career statistics			32	2	1	0	0	0	2	0	35	2
