= Nemanja Ivanov =

Serbian footballer

Personal information
- Full name: Nemanja Ivanov
- Date of birth: 6 October 1994 (age 32)
- Place of birth: Dimitrovgrad, Serbia
- Height: 1.88 m (6 ft 2 in)
- Position: Centre back

Team information
- Current team: Balkanski

Youth career
- FK Balkanski Dimitrovgrad
- Kostinbrod

Senior career*
Years	Team	Apps	(Gls)
2012–2013	Balkanski		
2014	Lyubimets	6	(0)
2014–2015	Radnički Pirot		
2015–2017	Sileks Kratovo	49	(1)
2017–2018	Atlantas	9	(0)
2018	Slavia Sofia	3	(0)
2019	Drava Ptuj	11	(1)
2019–2020	Lokomotiv Sofia	16	(1)
2020–2021	GFK Dubočica	21	(1)
2021–	Balkanski		

International career
- Serbia U17
- * Club domestic league appearances and goals as of 1 August 2020

Nemanja Ivanov (Serbian Cyrillic: Немања Иванов; born 6 October 1994) is a Serbian footballer who plays as a defender for FK Balkanski Dimitrovgrad.
