= Todor Trayanov =

Bulgarian footballer

Personal information
- Full name: Todor Antonov Trayanov
- Date of birth: 30 May 1995 (age 31)
- Place of birth: Simitli, Bulgaria
- Height: 1.78 m (5 ft 10 in)
- Position: Midfielder

Team information
- Current team: Septemvri Simitli
- Number: 8

Youth career
- –2014: Pirin Blagoevgrad

Senior career*
Years	Team	Apps	(Gls)
2014–2018	Pirin Blagoevgrad	69	(2)
2015	→ Septemvri Simitli (loan)	10	(0)
2018	Botev Vratsa	0	(0)
2018	→ Pirin Blagoevgrad (loan)	11	(1)
2019	KKS 1925 Kalisz	13	(1)
2019–2021	Lokomotiv Sofia	34	(1)
2021–	Septemvri Simitli	41	(2)
2022	FC Zell am See	14	(1)
2023–	Septemvri Simitli		

International career
2016	Bulgaria U21	1	(0)
- * Club domestic league appearances and goals as of 30 May 2024

Todor Antonov Trayanov (Bulgarian: Тодор Антонов Траянов; born 30 May 1995) is a Bulgarian professional footballer who plays as a midfielder for Septemvri Simitli.

== Career ==
Trayanov began his career at Pirin Blagoevgrad. In January 2015, he joined Septemvri Simitli on loan until the end of the 2014–15 season.

In June 2015, Trayanov returned to Pirin. He made his first competitive appearance for the club in a 0–0 away league draw against Levski Sofia on 30 August.

In June 2018, Trayanov signed with Botev Vratsa. After a loan spell at Pirin Blagoevgrad, he left Botev. He then signed for Polish club KKS 1925 Kalisz on 8 January 2019.
