= Denislav Stanchev =

Bulgarian footballer

Personal information
- Full name: Denislav Stefanov Stanchev
- Date of birth: 28 March 2000 (age 26)
- Place of birth: Stara Zagora, Bulgaria
- Height: 1.70 m (5 ft 7 in)
- Position: Winger

Team information
- Current team: Beroe

Youth career
- 2006–2008: Trayana
- 2008–2017: Beroe

Senior career*
Years	Team	Apps	(Gls)
2017	Beroe	5	(0)
2018–2019	Vereya	30	(2)
2019–2020	Bytovia Bytów	15	(0)
2020–2021	Lokomotiv Sofia	15	(5)
2021	Litex Lovech	8	(2)
2021–2022	Dobrudzha	24	(8)
2023	Beroe	7	(4)
2023–	Beroe caps8 =		

International career
2016	Bulgaria U17	2	(0)
2018	Bulgaria U18	6	(2)
- * Club domestic league appearances and goals as of 28 March 2024

Denislav Stanchev (Bulgarian: Денислав Станчев; born 28 March 2000) is a Bulgarian professional footballer who plays as a midfielder for Beroe.

== Career ==
On 17 February 2017, Stanchev made his professional debut for his hometown club Beroe Stara Zagora in a 4–0 away win against Dunav Ruse, coming on as substitute for Anton Karachanakov.
