= Daniel Naumov =

Bulgarian footballer

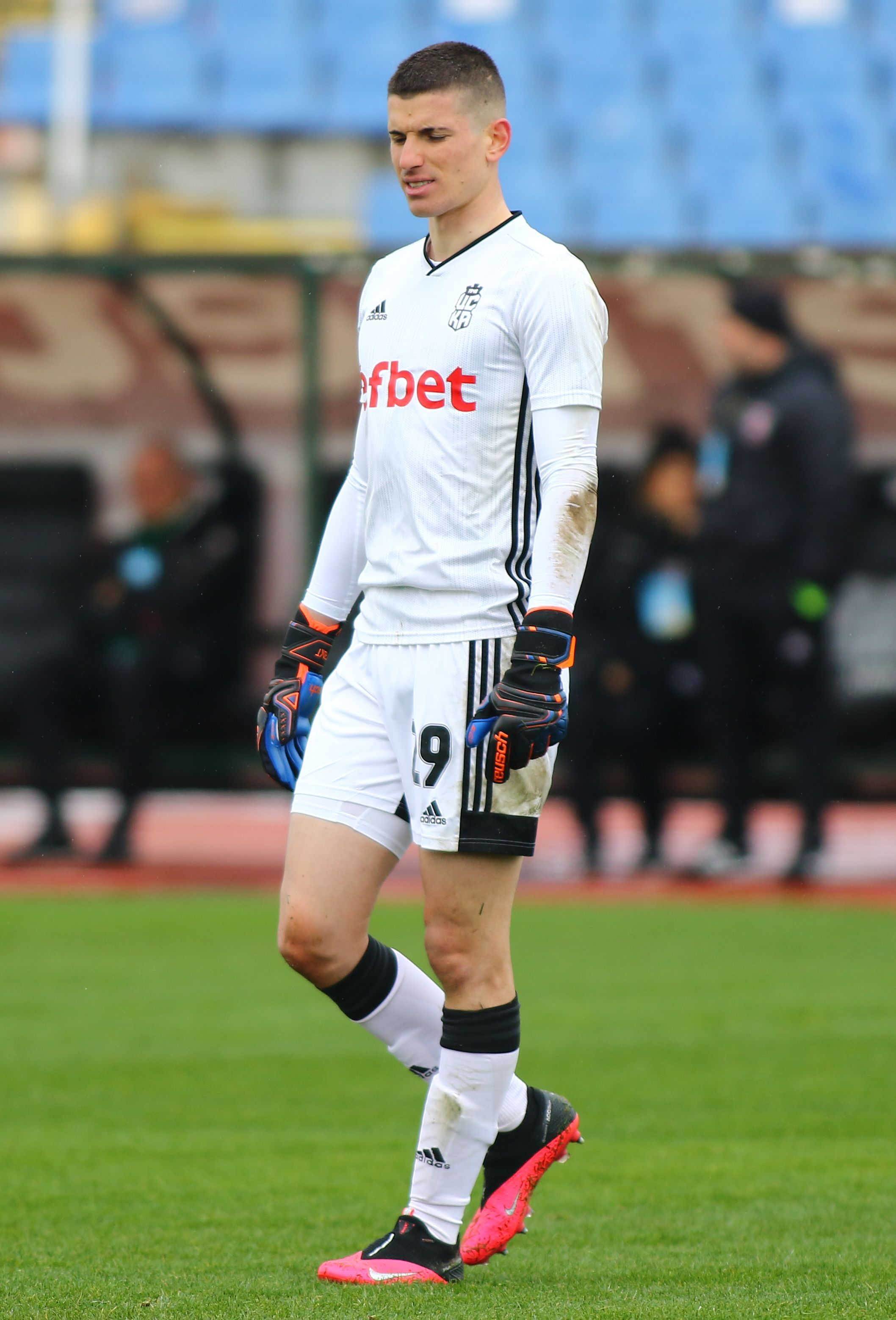
- Naumov with CSKA 1948 in 2021

Personal information
- Full name: Daniel Genadiev Naumov
- Date of birth: 29 March 1998 (age 28)
- Place of birth: Gotse Delchev, Bulgaria
- Height: 1.92 m (6 ft 3 1/2 in)
- Position: Goalkeeper

Team information
- Current team: Botev Plovdiv
- Number: 29

Youth career
- Pirin Gotse Delchev
- –2015: CSKA Sofia
- 2015–2017: Ludogorets Razgrad

Senior career*
Years	Team	Apps	(Gls)
2016–2019	Ludogorets II	62	(0)
2016–2019	Ludogorets Razgrad	2	(0)
2018	→ Vereya (loan)	5	(0)
2019–2024	CSKA 1948	108	(0)
2021	CSKA 1948 II	1	(0)
2024–2025	OFI Crete	7	(0)
2025–	Botev Plovdiv	45	(0)

International career^{‡}
2015–2016	Bulgaria U17	2	(0)
2015–2018	Bulgaria U19	15	(0)
2018–2020	Bulgaria U21	18	(0)
2020–	Bulgaria	17	(0)
- * Club domestic league appearances and goals as of 08:54, 8 October 2026 (UTC) ‡ National team caps and goals as of 13 November 2026

Daniel Genadiev Naumov (Bulgarian: Даниел Генадиев Наумов; born 29 March 1998) is a Bulgarian professional footballer who plays as a goalkeeper for Botev Plovdiv.

== Club career ==
=== Ludogorets ===
Born in Gotse Delchev, Naumov started his career from the local Pirin Gotse Delchev, before joining CSKA Sofia. In 2015, he moved to Ludogorets Razgrad Academy.

He made his debut for Ludogorets Razgrad II in B Group on 4 April 2016 in match against Neftochimic Burgas. After the injury of Vladislav Stoyanov in March 2017, Numov became the second-choice goalkeeper and on 18 April 2017 he made his debut for the first team in the Bulgarian Cup match against Litex Lovech, keeping a clean sheet in a 4–0 win. On 28 May 2017, he completed his First League debut in a 3–1 win over Cherno More.

Naumov started the 2017–18 season in Ludogorets II playing in the first match of the season against Lokomotiv 1929 Sofia.

==== Vereya (loan) ====
On 30 January 2018, Naumov was loaned to Vereya until end of the season in order to play in the First League. He made his debut for the team on 17 February 2018 in the first league match of the year against CSKA Sofia. Naumov ended the campaign with only five appearances due to a shoulder injury and noted that he hoped to become the first-choice goalkeeper in Ludogorets in the following season.

=== CSKA 1948 ===
In June 2019, Naumov joined Second League club CSKA 1948, in search of more starting games, signing a contract until June 2021. He quickly established himself as a first choice goalkeeper. In November 2019 he was watched by scouts of Manchester City & Southampton FC.

== International career ==
=== Youth levels ===
Naumov served as the captain of the Bulgaria U19 team for the 2017 European Under-19 Championship qualification from 22 to 27 March 2017. After a draw and two wins, the team qualified for the knockout phase which was held in July 2017.

In August 2017, he was called up for Bulgaria U21 for the 2019 UEFA European Under-21 Championship qualification match against Luxembourg, but dropped out after receiving an injury in league match with Ludogorets II and was replaced by Mihail Mihaylov. Naumov made his debut for Bulgaria U21 on 27 March 2018 in a European Under-21 qualification match against Slovenia U21, keeping a clean sheet in a 3–0 win.

=== Senior levels ===
In February 2020, Naumov was called up to the senior team for a friendly against Belarus, but did not debut. He made his debut on 31 March 2021, keeping a clean sheet for the draw against Northern Ireland for the 2022 FIFA World Cup qualification.

== Career statistics ==
=== Club ===
As of 11 January 2024

Club performance			League		Cup		Continental		Other		Total	
Club	Season	League	Apps	Goals	Apps	Goals	Apps	Goals	Apps	Goals	Apps	Goals
Ludogorets II	2015–16	Second League	7	0	—		—		—		7	0
Ludogorets II	2016–17	Second League	18	0	—		—		—		18	0
Ludogorets II	2017–18	Second League	12	0	—		—		—		12	0
Ludogorets II	2018–19	Second League	25	0	—		—		—		25	0
Ludogorets II	Total		62	0	0	0	0	0	0	0	62	0
Ludogorets	2015–16	First League	0	0	0	0	0	0	0	0	0	0
Ludogorets	2016–17	First League	2	0	1	0	0	0	0	0	3	0
Ludogorets	2017–18	First League	0	0	0	0	0	0	0	0	0	0
Ludogorets	2018–19	First League	0	0	0	0	0	0	0	0	0	0
Ludogorets	Total		2	0	1	0	0	0	0	0	3	0
Vereya (loan)	2017–18	First League	5	0	0	0	—		—		5	0
CSKA 1948	2019–20	Second League	17	0	3	0	—		—		20	0
CSKA 1948	2020–21	First League	30	0	1	0	—		—		31	0
CSKA 1948	2021–22	First League	27	0	1	0	—		—		28	0
CSKA 1948	2022–23	First League	33	0	5	0	—		—		38	0
CSKA 1948	2023–24	First League	16	0	2	0	2 (Note: Appearances in UEFA Europa Conference League)	0	—		20	0
CSKA 1948	Total		106	0	12	0	2	0	0	0	120	0
OFI	2024–25	Super League Greece	7	0	2	0	—		—		9	0
Botev Plovdiv	2025–26	First League	0	0	0	0	—		—		0	0
Career statistics			202	0	15	0	2	0	0	0	210	0

=== International ===
As of match played 13 November 2026

Appearances and goals by national team and year
National team	Year	Apps	Goals
Bulgaria	2020	0	0
Bulgaria	2021	3	0
Bulgaria	2022	3	0
Bulgaria	2023	4	0
Bulgaria	2026	7	0
Total		17	0
