= Ivaylo Stoyanov =

Bulgarian footballer

Personal information
- Full name: Ivaylo Yordanov Stoyanov
- Date of birth: 13 July 1990 (age 36)
- Place of birth: Pernik, Bulgaria
- Height: 1.78 m (5 ft 10 in)
- Position: Midfielder

Team information
- Current team: Strumska Slava
- Number: 16

Youth career
- Minyor Pernik
- Lokomotiv Sofia

Senior career*
Years	Team	Apps	(Gls)
2009–2013	Minyor Pernik	39	(2)
2014–2018	Strumska Slava	115	(32)
2018	Montana	0	(0)
2018	Minyor Pernik	17	(2)
2019	Germanea	16	(2)
2019	Chavdar Etropole	15	(2)
2020–2021	Strumska Slava	17	(3)
2021	Velbazhd	4	(0)
2021–2023	FC Kyustendil	22	(2)
2023–	Strumska Slava	14	(0)
- * Club domestic league appearances and goals as of 5 June 2023

Ivaylo Stoyanov (Bulgarian: Ивайло Стоянов; born 13 July 1990) is a Bulgarian footballer who plays as a midfielder for Strumska Slava.

== Career ==
Stoyanov left Strumska Slava Radomir at the end of the 2017–18 season, having made 115 appearances for the club.

On 2 July 2018, Stoyanov signed a one-year contract with Montana, following a successful trial period.

== Career statistics ==
As of 22 June 2012

Club	Season	League		Cup		Europe		Total	
Club	Season	Apps	Goals	Apps	Goals	Apps	Goals	Apps	Goals
Minyor Pernik	2009–10	1	0	0	0	—		1	0
Minyor Pernik	2010–11	5	0	0	0	—		5	0
Minyor Pernik	2011–12	19	2	0	0	—		19	2
Minyor Pernik	Total	25	2	0	0	0	0	25	2
Career total		25	2	0	0	0	0	25	2
