= Vladimir Semerdzhiev =

Bulgarian footballer

Personal information
- Full name: Vladimir Ivaylov Semerdzhiev
- Date of birth: 27 May 1995 (age 31)
- Place of birth: Sofia, Bulgaria
- Height: 1.81 m (5 ft 11 in)
- Position: Midfielder

Team information
- Current team: Minyor Pernik
- Number: 15

Youth career
- 2002–2014: Slavia Sofia

Senior career*
Years	Team	Apps	(Gls)
2014–2019	Slavia Sofia	52	(1)
2017–2018	→ Lokomotiv Sofia (loan)	28	(0)
2018–2019	→ Tsarsko Selo (loan)	25	(1)
2019–2022	Lokomotiv Sofia	66	(2)
2022–2024	Sportist Svoge	56	(2)
2024–	Minyor Pernik	10	(1)
- * Club domestic league appearances and goals as of 18:48, 27 November 2023 (UTC)

Vladimir Semerdzhiev (Bulgarian: Владимир Семерджиев; born 27 May 1995) is a Bulgarian footballer who plays as a midfielder for Minyor Pernik.

== Career ==
Semerdzhiev joined Slavia Sofia at the age of seven and progressed through the Slavia academy, earning a professional contract and a place in the first team squad in the process. On 17 May 2014, he made his senior team debut, as he came on as a substitute for Oleg Shalayev in Slavia last game of the season, a 2–0 home win over Pirin Gotse Delchev.

On 21 July 2017, Semerdzhiev was loaned to Second League club Lokomotiv Sofia. On 18 June 2018, he was loaned to another club from the second tier, Tsarsko Selo.

== Statistics ==
As of 11 May 2017

Club performance			League		Cup		Continental		Other		Total	
Club	League	Season	Apps	Goals	Apps	Goals	Apps	Goals	Apps	Goals	Apps	Goals
Bulgaria			League		Bulgarian Cup		Europe		Other (Note: Includes Bulgarian Supercup matches.)		Total	
Slavia Sofia	A Group	2013–14	1	0	0	0	–		–		1	0
Slavia Sofia	A Group	2014–15	15	0	2	0	–		–		17	0
Slavia Sofia	A Group	2015–16	21	1	0	0	–		–		21	1
Slavia Sofia	First League	2016–17	15	0	0	0	0	0	–		15	0
Slavia Sofia	Total		52	1	2	0	0	0	0	0	54	1
Career statistics			52	1	2	0	0	0	0	0	54	1
