= Mihail Milchev =

Bulgarian footballer

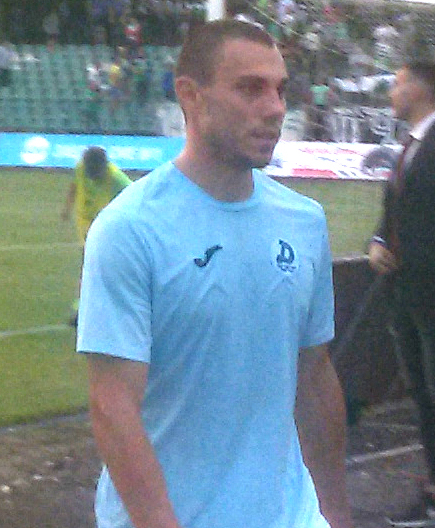

Personal information
- Full name: Mihail Miroslavov Milchev
- Date of birth: 18 June 1988 (age 38)
- Place of birth: Bulgaria
- Height: 1.78 m (5 ft 10 in)
- Positions: Right back; centre back

Team information
- Current team: Partizan Cherven Bryag
- Number: 22

Youth career
- Litex Lovech

Senior career*
Years	Team	Apps	(Gls)
2008–2011	Botev Krivodol	47	(0)
2011	Spartak Pleven	12	(1)
2012	Slavia Sofia	3	(0)
2012–2013	Spartak Pleven	24	(0)
2013–2018	Dunav Ruse	133	(9)
2018	Botev Vratsa	5	(0)
2018–2019	Vitosha Bistritsa	23	(0)
2019–2020	Dunav Ruse	28	(0)
2020–2021	Parva Atomna		
2021–	Partizan Cherven Bryag		
- * Club domestic league appearances and goals as of 17 August 2022

Mihail Milchev (Bulgarian: Михаил Милчев; born 18 June 1988) is a Bulgarian footballer who plays as a defender for Partizan Cherven Bryag.

== Career ==
On 8 June 2018, Milchev joined Botev Vratsa.

On 24 June 2019, Milchev signed with Dunav Ruse.
