= Mario Petkov =

Bulgarian footballer

Personal information
- Full name: Mario Petyov Petkov
- Date of birth: 4 December 1996 (age 29)
- Place of birth: Sofia, Bulgaria
- Height: 1.84 m (6 ft 0 in)
- Position: Defender

Team information
- Current team: Marek Dupnitsa
- Number: 5

Youth career
- Lokomotiv Sofia
- –2015: Slavia Sofia

Senior career*
Years	Team	Apps	(Gls)
2015–2018	Dunav Ruse	44	(0)
2017–2018	→ Tsarsko Selo (loan)	21	(0)
2018–2023	Lokomotiv Sofia	81	(3)
2023–2024	Ceahlăul Piatra Neamț	15	(1)
2024–2025	Marek Dupnitsa	19	(2)
2025	CSKA 1948	6	(0)
2025	CSKA 1948 II	11	(0)
2026-	Marek Dupnitsa	8	(0)

International career
2014	Bulgaria U19	6	(0)
2017–2018	Bulgaria U21	1	(0)
- * Club domestic league appearances and goals as of 11 June 2026

Mario Petyov Petkov (Bulgarian: Марио Петьoв Петков; born 4 December 1996) is a Bulgarian footballer who currently plays as a defender for Marek Dupnitsa.

== Career ==
On 4 September 2017, Petkov was loaned to Second League club Tsarsko Selo.

== Honours ==
Dunav Ruse

- B Group: 2015–16
