= Raif Muradov =

Bulgarian footballer (born 1993)

Personal information
- Full name: Raif Arifov Muradov
- Date of birth: 10 December 1993 (age 32)
- Place of birth: Gotse Delchev, Bulgaria
- Height: 1.83 m (6 ft 0 in)
- Position: Left back

Team information
- Current team: Levski Lom
- Number: 20

Youth career
- Pirin Gotse Delchev

Senior career*
Years	Team	Apps	(Gls)
2010–2013	Chavdar Etropole	37	(0)
2013–2015	Montana	26	(1)
2015	Botev Vratsa	10	(2)
2016	Montana	11	(0)
2017	Oborishte	12	(0)
2017	Chernomorets Balchik	15	(1)
2018	Spartak Pleven	?	(?)
2018	Kariana	1	(0)
2019	Rozova Dolina	7	(1)
2020	Spartak Pleven	4	(0)
2020–	Levski Lom	0	(0)

International career
2011	Bulgaria U19	3	(0)
- * Club domestic league appearances and goals as of 1 August 2020

Raif Muradov (Bulgarian: Раиф Мурадов; born 10 December 1993) is a Bulgarian footballer who plays as a defender for Levski Lom.

== Career ==
Muradov began his professional career at Chavdar Etropole. In 2013, he moved to Montana. After helping the team to gain promotion to the A Group, he was released from the team and joined the 3rd league team Botev Vratsa.

In January 2016, Muradov returned to Montana. He made his A Group debut on 6 March 2016 in a match against Cherno More Varna. On 24 November 2016, Muradov's contract was terminated by mutual consent.

On 22 December 2016, Muradov joined Oborishte Panagyurishte. On 30 June 2017, he moved to Chernomorets Balchik.

In January 2018, Muradov joined North-West Third League side Spartak Pleven but was released at the end of the season.

On 24 July 2018, Muradov signed with Kariana.
