= Salas Okechukwu =

Nigerian footballer

Personal information
- Full name: Salas Obasi Okechukwu
- Date of birth: 15 May 1989 (age 37)
- Place of birth: Yola, Nigeria
- Height: 1.79 m (5 ft 10 in)
- Position: Winger

Team information
- Current team: Levski Chepintsi

Senior career*
Years	Team	Apps	(Gls)
2008	Chepinets Velingrad		
2009	Hebar Pazardzhik	11	(0)
2010	Levski Elin Pelin		
2010–2011	Oborishte		
2011–2013	Minyor Pernik	35	(2)
2014–2015	Oborishte	49	(10)
2016	Botev Ihtiman	13	(9)
2016–2018	Tsarsko Selo	40	(4)
2018	→ Strumska Slava (loan)	7	(0)
2019	Nadezhda Dovroslavtsi		
2019–2020	Gigant Belene		
2020–	Levski Chepintsi		
- * Club domestic league appearances and goals as of 13 October 2021

Salas Obasi Okechukwu (born 15 May 1989) is a Nigerian professional footballer who plays as a winger for Bulgarian Third league club Levski Chepintsi.

== Career ==
In February 2008 Okechukwu joined Bulgarian third division side Chepinets Velingrad.

On 23 October 2010, Okechukwu joined Oborishte Panagyurishte in fourth division. On 18 June 2011, he scored a goal and provided assist in the play-off for promotion to the Bulgarian V AFG, which helped Oborishte to a 4–0 victory over Rilski Sportist Samokov.

After visiting Minyor Pernik on trial in June 2011, he signed his first professional contract with the club on 22 July. Okechukwu made his A PFG debut on 6 August in a 1–0 home win over Vidima-Rakovski, coming on as a substitute for Farès Brahimi.

In February 2018, Okechukwu was loaned from Tsarsko Selo to Bulgarian Second League rivals Strumska Slava. He returned to his parent club at the end of the season.

== Career statistics ==
As of 20 June 2015

Appearances and goals by club, season and competition
Club	Season	League		Cup		Continental		Total	
Club	Season	Apps	Goals	Apps	Goals	Apps	Goals	Apps	Goals
Minyor Pernik	2011–12	17	0	2	0	–		19	0
Minyor Pernik	2012–13	18	2	6	1	–		24	3
Minyor Pernik	Total	35	2	8	1	–		43	3
Oborishte	2013–14	14	3	0	0	–		14	3
Oborishte	2014–15	22	6	0	0	–		22	6
Oborishte	2015–16	13	1	1	0	–		14	1
Oborishte	Total	49	10	1	0	–		50	10
