= Esquerdinha (footballer, born 1992) =

Brazilian footballer

Personal information
- Full name: Victor de Almeida Sandes
- Date of birth: 8 January 1992 (age 34)
- Place of birth: Garanhuns, Brazil
- Position: Midfielder

Team information
- Current team: Concórdia

Youth career
- Atlético Paranaense

Senior career*
Years	Team	Apps	(Gls)
2011–2016	Atlético Paranaense	2	(0)
2013	→ Ferroviária (loan)	0	(0)
2015	→ Guaratinguetá (loan)	0	(0)
2016	→ Brasília (loan)	1	(0)
2017	Guarany	3	(0)
2018	Dunav Ruse	6	(0)
2019	Acadêmica Vitória	0	(0)
2019–	Concórdia		
- * Club domestic league appearances and goals as of 14:41, 29 April 2019 (UTC)

Victor de Almeida Sandes (born 8 January 1992), commonly known as Esquerdinha, is a Brazilian footballer who plays as a midfielder for Concórdia.
