= Hristo Lemperov =

Bulgarian footballer

Personal information
- Full name: Hristo Georgiev Lemperov
- Date of birth: 22 April 1988 (age 38)
- Place of birth: Burgas, Bulgaria
- Height: 1.76 m (5 ft 9 1/2 in)
- Position: Midfielder

Senior career*
Years	Team	Apps	(Gls)
2007–2009	Naftex Burgas	38	(17)
2009–2012	Chernomorets Pomorie	30	(1)
2012–2013	Neftochimic 1986	34	(1)
2014	Master Burgas	9	(4)
2014	Académica do Lobito	26	(13)
2015–2017	Pomorie	80	(25)
2018	Dunav Ruse	5	(0)
2018–2019	Chernomorets Burgas		
2019–2020	Pomorie	16	(0)
- * Club domestic league appearances and goals as of 1 July 2020

Hristo Lemperov (Bulgarian: Христо Лемперов; born 22 April 1988) is a Bulgarian retired footballer who last played as a midfielder for Pomorie.
