= Plamen Tenev =

Bulgarian footballer

Personal information
- Full name: Plamen Kirchev Tenev
- Date of birth: 13 June 1995 (age 31)
- Place of birth: Radnevo, Bulgaria
- Height: 1.83 m (6 ft 0 in)
- Position: Defender

Team information
- Current team: Zagorets
- Number: 4

Youth career
- 2004–2013: Beroe

Senior career*
Years	Team	Apps	(Gls)
2013–2017	Beroe	14	(0)
2015	→ Spartak Pleven (loan)	12	(0)
2016	→ Vereya (loan)	12	(0)
2016	→ Nesebar (loan)	17	(0)
2018	Vereya	13	(1)
2018–2019	Tsarsko Selo	21	(2)
2019–2020	Neftochimic	17	(2)
2020	Lokomotiv GO	5	(0)
2021–2022	Yantra Gabrovo	43	(1)
2022–	Zagorets		

International career
2014–2016	Bulgaria U21	1	(0)
- * Club domestic league appearances and goals as of 12 August 2022

Plamen Tenev (Bulgarian: Пламен Тенев; born 13 June 1995) is a Bulgarian footballer who currently plays as a defender for Zagorets.

== Career ==
On 5 January 2018, Tenev signed a 1 1/2-year contract with Vereya.

In July 2018, Tenev moved to Tsarsko Selo.

After a year in Neftochimik, Tenev joined Lokomotiv GO.

== Club statistics ==
=== Club ===
As of 29 December 2015

Club	Season	Division	League		Cup		Europe		Total	
Club	Season	Division	Apps	Goals	Apps	Goals	Apps	Goals	Apps	Goals
Beroe Stara Zagora	2012–13	A Group	1	0	0	0	–		1	0
Beroe Stara Zagora	2013–14	A Group	4	0	1	0	–		5	0
Beroe Stara Zagora	2014–15	A Group	1	0	0	0	0	0	1	0
Spartak Pleven (loan)	2015–16	B Group	12	0	2	0	–		14	0
Beroe Stara Zagora	2015–16	A Group	0	0	0	0	0	0	0	0
Beroe Stara Zagora	Total		5	0	2	0	0	0	7	0
Career Total			18	0	2	0	0	0	20	0
