= Rumen Rangelov =

Bulgarian footballer

Personal information
- Full name: Rumen Ivaylov Rangelov
- Date of birth: 30 November 1985 (age 40)
- Place of birth: Vratsa, Bulgaria
- Height: 1.80 m (5 ft 11 in)
- Position: Forward

Team information
- Current team: Lokomotiv Mezdra

Senior career*
Years	Team	Apps	(Gls)
2004–2006	Botev Vratsa		
2007–2009	Lokomotiv Sofia	5	(1)
2008	→ Chavdar Etropole (loan)	9	(0)
2009–2010	Botev Vratsa	22	(15)
2010–2011	Minyor Pernik	20	(3)
2012–2015	Botev Vratsa	57	(12)
2015–2017	Kariana Erden	61	(36)
2018	Botev Vratsa	0	(0)
2018–	Lokomotiv Mezdra	0	(0)
- * Club domestic league appearances and goals as of 26 May 2018

Rumen Rangelov (Bulgarian: Румен Рангелов; born 30 November 1985) is a Bulgarian footballer who plays as a forward for Lokomotiv Mezdra.

== Career ==
Rangelov spent most of his career at his hometown club Botev Vratsa, where he last played until June 2018.
