= Kristiyan Katsarev =

Bulgarian footballer

Personal information
- Full name: Kristiyan Donchev Katsarev
- Date of birth: 7 August 1995 (age 31)
- Place of birth: Plovdiv, Bulgaria
- Height: 1.90 m (6 ft 3 in)
- Position: Goalkeeper

Youth career
- 2003–2013: Lokomotiv Plovdiv

Senior career*
| Years | Team | Apps | (Gls) |
| 2013–2015 | Lokomotiv Sofia | 1 | (0) |
| 2015–2017 | Lokomotiv Plovdiv | 0 | (0) |
| 2017 | Lokomotiv GO | 9 | (0) |
| 2018 | Lokomotiv Sofia | 2 | (0) |
| 2018 | Tsarsko Selo | 2 | (0) |
| 2019 | Vereya | 6 | (0) |
| 2019–2020 | Vitosha Bistritsa | 6 | (0) |
| 2020–2022 | Sokol Markovo | | |

International career
| 2014 | Bulgaria U19 | 2 | (0) |
- * Club domestic league appearances and goals as of 8 October 2022

Kristiyan Katsarev (Bulgarian: Кристиян Кацарев; born 7 August 1995) is a Bulgarian footballer who plays as a goalkeeper.

== Career ==
In July 2017, Katsarev joined Lokomotiv Gorna Oryahovitsa.

In June 2018, he moved to Tsarsko Selo.

== Club statistics ==
=== Club ===
As of 1 June 2015

| Club | Season | Division | League | | Cup | | Europe | | Total | |
| Club | Season | Division | Apps | Goals | Apps | Goals | Apps | Goals | Apps | Goals |
|---|---|---|---|---|---|---|---|---|---|---|
| Lokomotiv Sofia | 2013–14 | A Group | 1 | 0 | 0 | 0 | 0 | 0 | 1 | 0 |
| Career Total | | | 1 | 0 | 0 | 0 | 0 | 0 | 1 | 0 |
