= Denis Grgic =

German footballer

Personal information
- Date of birth: 19 September 1991 (age 35)
- Place of birth: Germany
- Height: 1.98 m (6 ft 6 in)
- Position: Goalkeeper

Youth career
- 2000–2007: VfL Kirchheim
- 2007–2008: Stuttgarter Kickers
- 2008–2009: Karlsruher SC

Senior career*
Years	Team	Apps	(Gls)
2009–2010	Normannia Gmünd		
2010	1. FC Frickenhausen		
2011	Ulm 1846	0	(0)
2011–2012	SV Ebersbach/Fils		
2013	SSV Reutlingen		
2013	RM Hamm Benfica		
2014	SGV Freiberg		
2014–2015	1. FC Eislingen	4	(0)
2015	SSV Reutlingen	14	(0)
2015–2016	Leinfelden-Echterdingen	28	(1)
2017	1. FC Frickenhausen	21	(0)
2018	Etar	5	(0)
2018–2019	SpVgg Bayreuth		
- * Club domestic league appearances and goals

Denis Grgic (born 19 September 1991) is a German former professional footballer who played as a goalkeeper.

== Career ==
In February 2018, Grgic signed for Bulgarian First League club Etar Veliko Tarnovo. He was released at the end of the season.

By January 2022, he was no longer playing professionally.
