= Ivaylo Yanachkov =

Bulgarian footballer

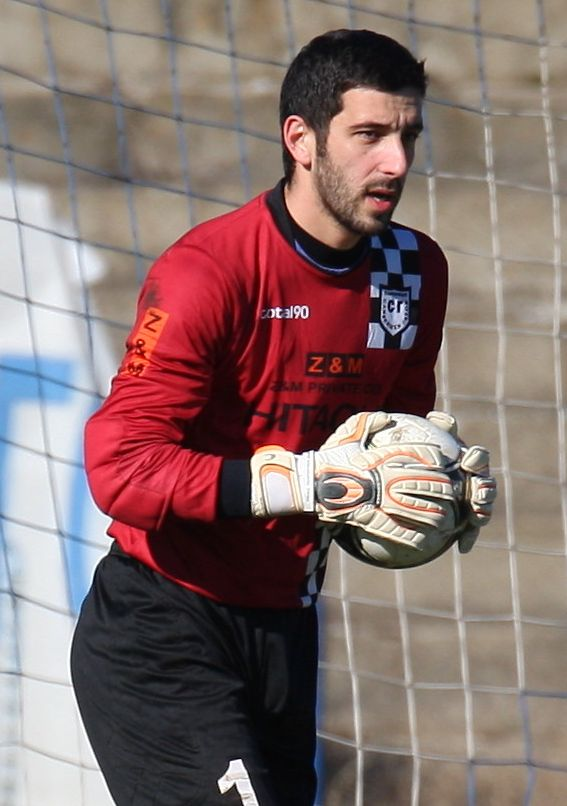

Personal information
- Full name: Ivaylo Mihaylov Yanachkov
- Date of birth: 31 August 1986 (age 40)
- Place of birth: Sofia, Bulgaria
- Height: 1.93 m (6 ft 4 in)
- Position: Goalkeeper

Team information
- Current team: Ægir
- Number: 25

Senior career*
Years	Team	Apps	(Gls)
2006–2007	Rodopa Smolyan	0	(0)
2007–2009	Rilski Sportist	26	(0)
2009–2011	Chavdar Etropole	67	(0)
2012	Montana	16	(0)
2013	Botev Vratsa	1	(0)
2014	Slivnishki Geroy	23	(0)
2015–2016	Oborishte	26	(0)
2016–2017	Botev Vratsa	23	(0)
2017	Lokomotiv Sofia	12	(0)
2018	Spartak Pleven	14	(0)
2018	Pirin Blagoevgrad	14	(0)
2019	Þróttur Vogum	21	(0)
2020	Ægir	20	(0)
2021–2022	Vihren Sandanski	16	(0)
2022–	Ægir	31	(0)
- * Club domestic league appearances and goals as of 1 November 2023

Ivaylo Yanachkov (Bulgarian: Ивайло Яначков; born 31 August 1986) is a Bulgarian professional football goalkeeper who plays for Ægir.

== Career ==
In January 2014, Yanachkov signed with Slivnishki Geroy. In June 2017, Yanachkov moved from Botev Vratsa to Lokomotiv Sofia.

In January 2018, Yanachkov joined North-West Third League side Spartak Pleven but was released at the end of the season.
