= Stoyan Predev =

Bulgarian footballer

Personal information
- Full name: Stoyan Petrov Predev
- Date of birth: 19 August 1993 (age 33)
- Place of birth: Sofia, Bulgaria
- Height: 1.81 m (5 ft 11 1/2 in)
- Position: Defender

Team information
- Current team: Dunav Ruse
- Number: 22

Youth career
- Slavia Sofia

Senior career*
Years	Team	Apps	(Gls)
2011–2012	Slavia Sofia	1	(0)
2013–2014	Vitosha Bistritsa	5	(0)
2014–2015	Sportist Svoge		
2015–2017	Septemvri Sofia	44	(2)
2016	→ Pirin Razlog (loan)	12	(0)
2018	Lokomotiv Sofia	11	(0)
2018–2020	Kariana	56	(2)
2020–2022	Montana	30	(0)
2022–	Dunav Ruse	121	(2)
- * Club domestic league appearances and goals as of 24 May 2026

Stoyan Predev (Bulgarian: Стоян Предев; born 19 August 1993) is a Bulgarian footballer who plays as a defender for Dunav Ruse.

== Career ==
On 1 July 2018, Predev signed with Kariana.

== Career statistics ==
=== Club ===
As of 20 January 2018

Club	Season	Division	League		Cup		Europe		Other		Total	
Club	Season	Division	Apps	Goals	Apps	Goals	Apps	Goals	Apps	Goals	Apps	Goals
Slavia Sofia	2010–11	A Group	1	0	0	0	–		–		1	0
Slavia Sofia	2011–12	A Group	0	0	0	0	–		–		0	0
Slavia Sofia	2012–13	A Group	0	0	0	0	–		–		0	0
Vitosha Bistritsa	2013–14	B Group	5	0	3	0	–		–		8	0
Septemvri Sofia	2015–16	V Group	16	1	0	0	–		–		16	1
Pirin Razlog (loan)	2015–16	B Group	12	0	0	0	–		–		12	0
Septemvri Sofia	2016–17	Second League	23	1	2	0	–		1	0	26	1
Septemvri Sofia	2017–18	First League	5	0	1	0	–		–		6	0
Septemvri Sofia	Total		44	2	3	0	0	0	1	0	48	2
Lokomotiv Sofia	2017–18	Second League	0	0	0	0	–		–		0	0
Career statistics			62	2	6	0	0	0	1	0	69	2
