= Stefan Nedelchev =

Bulgarian footballer

Personal information
- Full name: Stefan Svetoslavov Nedelchev
- Date of birth: 9 May 1996 (age 30)
- Place of birth: Pavlikeni, Bulgaria
- Height: 1.81 m (5 ft 11 1/2 in)
- Positions: Winger; forward

Team information
- Current team: Lokomotiv GO
- Number: 17

Youth career
- 2003–2010: Pavlikeni
- 2010–2015: Litex Lovech

Senior career*
Years	Team	Apps	(Gls)
2015–2016	Neftochimic	17	(3)
2016–2018	Etar	23	(4)
2017	→ Botev Galabovo (loan)	11	(2)
2018	Litex Lovech	2	(0)
2020	Lokomotiv GO	8	(0)
2020–2022	Litex Lovech	38	(4)
2022–	Lokomotiv GO	?	(1)

International career
2017	Bulgaria U21	1	(0)
- * Club domestic league appearances and goals as of 15 April 2022

Stefan Nedelchev (Bulgarian: Стефан Неделчев; born 9 May 1996) is a Bulgarian footballer who plays as a winger for Lokomotiv GO.

== Career ==
=== Early career ===
Nedelchev started his career in the local team of Pavlikeni aged seven. In 2010 he moved to Litex Lovech Academy. In the summer of 2015 he joined the summer camp of Neftochimic Burgas and signed a contract. He made his debut for the team on 25 July 2015 in match against Lokomotiv 2012 Mezdra.

=== Etar Veliko Tarnovo ===
In July 2016 Nedelchev moved to the newly promoted to Bulgarian Second League team of Etar Veliko Tarnovo. He made his debut for the team in the league on 13 August 2016 in match against Levski Karlovo. He scored his debut goal for the club on 17 September 2016 in match against Pomorie. The team won the league and promoted to First Professional Football League in the end of the season.

Nedelchev completed his professional debut on 14 July 2017 in the debut league match of the team against Lokomotiv Plovdiv.

On 16 August 2017, Nedelchev was loaned to Botev Galabovo until the end of the season.

== International career ==
=== Youth levels ===
Nedelchev was called up for the Bulgaria U21 team on 14 March 2017.

== Career statistics ==
=== Club ===
As of 30 May 2017

Club performance			League		Cup		Continental		Other		Total	
Club	League	Season	Apps	Goals	Apps	Goals	Apps	Goals	Apps	Goals	Apps	Goals
Bulgaria			League		Bulgarian Cup		Europe		Other		Total	
Neftochimic Burgas	B Group	2015–16	17	3	1	0	–		–		18	3
Etar Veliko Tarnovo	Second League	2016–17	21	4	1	0	–		–		22	4
Etar Veliko Tarnovo	First League	2017–18	1	0	0	0	–		0	0	1	0
Etar Veliko Tarnovo	Total		22	4	1	0	0	0	0	0	23	4
Career statistics			39	7	2	0	0	0	0	0	41	7
