= Milko Georgiev =

Bulgarian footballer

Personal information
- Full name: Milko Georgiev Georgiev
- Date of birth: 3 August 1998 (age 28)
- Place of birth: Sandanski, Bulgaria
- Height: 1.72 m (5 ft 8 in)
- Position: Midfielder

Team information
- Current team: Bansko
- Number: 7

Youth career
- 2011–2016: Botev Plovdiv

Senior career*
| Years | Team | Apps | (Gls) |
| 2016–2019 | Botev Plovdiv | 18 | (1) |
| 2017 | → Chernomorets Balchik (loan) | 9 | (0) |
| 2018 | → Pirin Blagoevgrad (loan) | 6 | (0) |
| 2019–2020 | CSKA 1948 | 9 | (0) |
| 2020 | Oborishte | ? | (1) |
| 2021– | Bansko | ? | (2) |

International career^{‡}
| 2016–2017 | Bulgaria U19 | 3 | (0) |
- * Club domestic league appearances and goals as of 29 March 2022 ‡ National team caps and goals as of 11:32, 10 February 2017 (UTC)

Milko Georgiev (Bulgarian: Милко Георгиев; born 3 August 1998) is a Bulgarian footballer who currently plays as a midfielder for Bansko.

== Career ==
=== Botev Plovdiv ===
Born in Vidin, Georgiev joined Botev Plovdiv at academy level in 2013. On 24 April 2016, he made his A Group debut in the local derby against Lokomotiv Plovdiv.

On 16 June 2017, Georgiev signed his first professional contract with the club. In July 2017, he was loaned to Second League club Oborishte Panagyurishte but couldn't agree personal terms and in August moved to Chernomorets Balchik on loan.

On 21 April 2018 Milko Georgiev scored his first goal for Botev Plovdiv during the 2–4 defeat from Ludogorets Razgrad. After that he participated in the home wins over CSKA Sofia and Beroe Stara Zagora.

== Career statistics ==
=== Club ===
As of 25 May 2017

| Club performance | | | League | | Cup | | Continental | | Other | | Total | |
| Club | League | Season | Apps | Goals | Apps | Goals | Apps | Goals | Apps | Goals | Apps | Goals |
| Bulgaria | | | League | | Bulgarian Cup | | Europe | | Other (Note: Includes Bulgarian Supercup matches.) | | Total | |
|---|---|---|---|---|---|---|---|---|---|---|---|---|
| Botev Plovdiv | A Group | 2015–16 | 3 | 0 | 0 | 0 | 0 (Note: UEFA Europa League matches.) | 0 | – | | 3 | 0 |
| Botev Plovdiv | First League | 2016–17 | 9 | 0 | 1 | 0 | – | | – | | 10 | 0 |
| Botev Plovdiv | Total | | 12 | 0 | 1 | 0 | 0 | 0 | 0 | 0 | 13 | 0 |
| Career statistics | | | 12 | 0 | 1 | 0 | 0 | 0 | 0 | 0 | 13 | 0 |

== Honours ==
Botev Plovdiv

- Bulgarian Cup: 2016–17
