= Mihail Mihaylov (footballer, born 1997) =

Bulgarian footballer

Personal information
- Full name: Mihail Dimitrov Mihaylov
- Date of birth: 16 June 1997 (age 29)
- Place of birth: Stara Zagora, Bulgaria
- Height: 1.86 m (6 ft 1 in)
- Position: Goalkeeper

Team information
- Current team: Botev Galabovo
- Number: 1

Youth career
- Beroe

Senior career*
Years	Team	Apps	(Gls)
2014–2018	Beroe	1	(0)
2018	→ Botev Galabovo (loan)	1	(0)
2018–2019	Minyor Radnevo	?	(?)
2020–	Botev Galabovo	0	(0)

International career^{‡}
2012–2015	Bulgaria U17	16	(0)
2015–2016	Bulgaria U19	6	(0)
2016–2017	Bulgaria U21	2	(0)
- * Club domestic league appearances and goals as of 23 May 2018 ‡ National team caps and goals as of 12 June 2017

Mihail Mihaylov (Bulgarian: Михаил Михайлов; born 16 July 1997) is a Bulgarian footballer who plays for Botev Galabovo as a goalkeeper.

== Career ==
=== Beroe ===
On 17 May 2014 Mihaylov was on the bench in the match against Neftochimic 3 years later, after being on the bench several times, he made his official debut for Beroe against Neftochimic.

On 4 January 2018, Mihaylov was loaned to Second League club Botev Galabovo until the end of the season. He was released by the club at the end of the 2017–18 season.

== Career statistics ==
=== Club ===
As of 21 September 2017

Club performance			League		Cup		Continental		Total	
Club	League	Season	Apps	Goals	Apps	Goals	Apps	Goals	Apps	Goals
Bulgaria			League		Bulgarian Cup		Europe		Total	
Beroe	A Group	2013–14	0	0	0	0	–		0	0
Beroe	A Group	2014–15	0	0	0	0	–		0	0
Beroe	A Group	2015–16	0	0	0	0	–		0	0
Beroe	First League	2016–17	1	0	0	0	0	0	1	0
Beroe	First League	2017–18	0	0	1	0	–		1	0
Beroe	Total		1	0	1	0	0	0	2	0
Career statistics			1	0	1	0	0	0	2	0
