= Bogomil Tsintsarski =

Bulgarian footballer

Personal information
- Full name: Bogomil Yordanov Tsintsarski
- Date of birth: 14 May 1997 (age 29)
- Place of birth: Las Vegas, Nevada, United States
- Height: 1.80 m (5 ft 11 in)
- Position: Goalkeeper

Team information
- Current team: Spartak Pleven
- Number: 12

Youth career
- –2017: Beroe

Senior career*
Years	Team	Apps	(Gls)
2017–2018	Beroe	0	(0)
2018	→ Vereya (loan)	7	(0)
2018–2019	Vereya	5	(0)
2019–2020	Minyor Radnevo	20	(0)
2021–2022	Yantra Gabrovo	25	(0)
2022–	Spartak Pleven	26	(0)
- * Club domestic league appearances and goals as of 26 November 2023

Bogomil Tsintsarski (Bulgarian: Богомил Цинцарски; born 14 May 1997) is a Bulgarian footballer who plays as a goalkeeper for Spartak Pleven.

== Career ==
=== Vereya ===
Tsintsarski was sent on loan from Beroe to Vereya in January 2018, until end of the season. He made his debut for the team on 24 February 2018 in league match against Dunav Ruse. In the league match against Levski Sofia on 21 April 2018 he made 5 savings and one of them was included in the saving of the round. On 23 May 2018 it was announced that after his loan end, he and 5 other players will be released from Beroe at the end of the season.

On 15 June 2018, Tsintsarski started pre-season training with Vereya.

== Career statistics ==
=== Club ===
As of 5 October 2018

Club performance			League		Cup		Continental		Other		Total	
Club	League	Season	Apps	Goals	Apps	Goals	Apps	Goals	Apps	Goals	Apps	Goals
Bulgaria			League		Bulgarian Cup		Europe		Other		Total	
Beroe Stara Zagora	First League	2017–18	0	0	0	0	0	0	–		0	0
Beroe Stara Zagora	Total		0	0	0	0	0	0	0	0	0	0
Vereya (loan)	First League	2017–18	7	0	0	0	–		–		7	0
Vereya	First League	2018–19	1	0	1	0	–		–		2	0
Vereya	Total		8	0	1	0	0	0	0	0	9	0
Career statistics			8	0	1	0	0	0	0	0	9	0
