= Yordan Todorov (footballer, born November 1981) =

Bulgarian footballer

Personal information
- Full name: Yordan Georgiev Todorov
- Date of birth: 12 November 1981 (age 44)
- Place of birth: Montana, Bulgaria
- Height: 1.82 m (5 ft 11 1/2 in)
- Position: Midfielder

Youth career
- –2004: Marek

Senior career*
Years	Team	Apps	(Gls)
2005–2015	Montana	196	(20)
2016–2018	Kariana		
2018–2020	Kom		
2020–2022	Drenovets		
- * Club domestic league appearances and goals

Yordan Todorov – Paro (Bulgarian: Йордан Тодоров – Паро; born 12 November 1981) is a retired Bulgarian footballer, who played as a midfielder.

== Career ==
Todorov spent almost his entire career at Montana. Between 2016 and 2018 he played for Kariana but was released at the end of the 2017–18 season. In July 2018, Todorov joined Kom.
