= Yordan Todorov (footballer, born 1999) =

Bulgarian footballer

Yordan Yankov Todorov
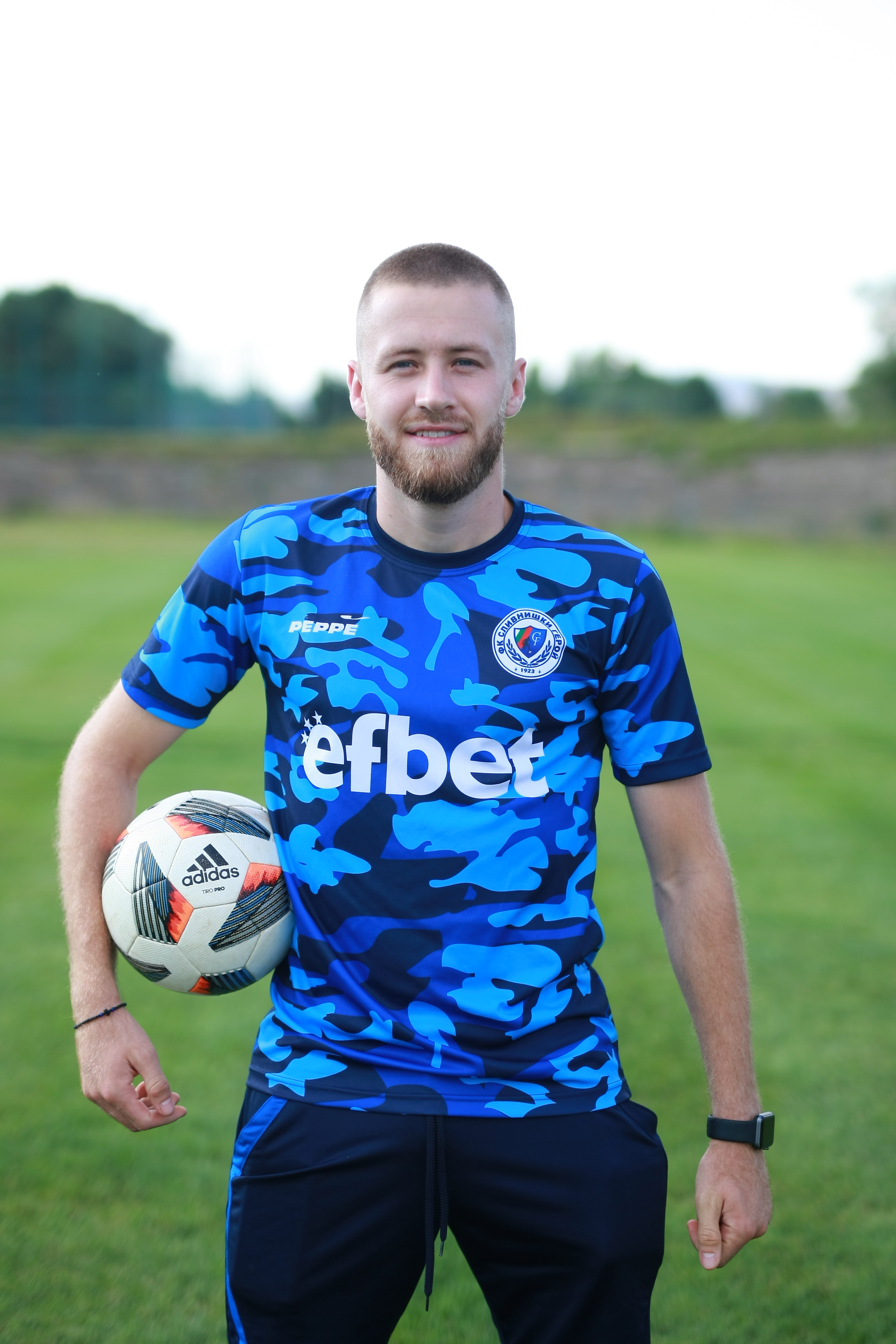

Personal information
- Full name: Yordan Yankov Todorov
- Date of birth: 13 July 1999 (age 27)
- Place of birth: Bulgaria
- Position: Midfielder

Youth career
- –2015: Dit Sofia
- 2015–2018: Septemvri Sofia

Senior career*
Years	Team	Apps	(Gls)
2017–2019	Septemvri Sofia	1	(0)
2018–2019	→ Lokomotiv Sofia (loan)	13	(0)
2019–2020	Rilski Sportist	17	(1)
2020–2021	Hebar	24	(1)
2021–2022	Belasitsa Petrich	10	(2)
2022-	FC Slivnishki Geroy (Slivnitsa)	0	(0)

International career
2015–2016	Bulgaria U17		
- * Club domestic league appearances and goals as of 3 May 2022

Yordan Todorov (Bulgarian: Йордан Тодоров; born 1 January 1999) is a Bulgarian footballer who plays as a winger. He is currently played for FC Slivnishki Geroy (Slivnitsa).

== Career ==
=== Septemvri Sofia ===
In the summer of 2017 Yordan Todorov was promoted to the first team of Septemvri Sofia. He made his professional debut for the team on 12 October 2017 in league match against Botev Plovdiv.

== Career statistics ==
=== Club ===
As of 7 November 2017

Club performance			League		Cup		Continental		Other		Total	
Club	League	Season	Apps	Goals	Apps	Goals	Apps	Goals	Apps	Goals	Apps	Goals
Bulgaria			League		Bulgarian Cup		Europe		Other		Total	
Septemvri Sofia	First League	2017–18	1	0	0	0	–		–		1	0
Septemvri Sofia	Total		1	0	0	0	0	0	0	0	1	0
Career statistics			1	0	0	0	0	0	0	0	1	0
