= Nikolay Radev =

Bulgarian footballer

Personal information
- Full name: Nikolay Borislavov Radev
- Date of birth: 17 July 1996 (age 30)
- Place of birth: Sofia, Bulgaria
- Height: 1.90 m (6 ft 3 in)
- Position: Goalkeeper

Team information
- Current team: Botev Ihtiman
- Number: 55

Youth career
- –2013: CSKA Sofia
- 2013–2016: Vitosha Bistritsa

Senior career*
Years	Team	Apps	(Gls)
2016–2019	Vitosha Bistritsa	5	(0)
2018	→ Oborishte (loan)	3	(0)
2019–2020	Sportist Svoge	4	(0)
2020–	Botev Ihtiman	0	(0)
- * Club domestic league appearances and goals as of 1 July 2020

Nikolay Radev (Bulgarian: Николай Радев; born 17 July 1996) is a Bulgarian footballer who plays as a goalkeeper for Botev Ihtiman.

== Career ==
=== Vitosha Bistritsa ===
On 29 August 2013 he joined Vitosha Bistritsa Academy from CSKA Sofia. In January 2018, Radev was loaned to Oborishte but returned to his parent club in July.

== Career statistics ==
=== Club ===
As of 16 September 2017

Club performance			League		Cup		Continental		Other		Total	
Club	League	Season	Apps	Goals	Apps	Goals	Apps	Goals	Apps	Goals	Apps	Goals
Bulgaria			League		Bulgarian Cup		Europe		Other		Total	
Vitosha Bistritsa	Second League	2016–17	2	0	1	0	–		0	0	3	0
Vitosha Bistritsa	First League	2017–18	1	0	0	0	–		–		1	0
Vitosha Bistritsa	Total		3	0	1	0	0	0	1	0	4	0
Career statistics			3	0	1	0	0	0	0	0	4	0
