= FC Minyor Radnevo =

Bulgarian football club

Minyor Radnevo
- Full name: FC Minyor Radnevo
- Founded: 1952; 74 years ago
- Ground: Minyor Stadium, Radnevo
- Capacity: 2000
- Manager: Ivan Gadzhev
- League: A RFG Stara Zagora
- 2025–26: A RFG Stara Zagora, 6th
Home colours	Away colours

FC Minyor Radnevo (ПФК Миньор Раднево) is a Bulgarian football club from the town of Radnevo that has played in the South-East Third League, the third division of Bulgarian football. The club was founded in 1952.

== Honours ==
Cup of the Soviet Army

- Runners-up (1): 1989

== Current squad ==
As of 1 February 2020 Note: Flags indicate national team as defined under FIFA eligibility rules; some limited exceptions apply. Players may hold more than one non-FIFA nationality.

No.	Pos.	Nation	Player
1	GK	BUL	Kristian Petkov
4	DF	BUL	Diyan Dinev
6	DF	BUL	Ivelin Ivanov
7	MF	BUL	Ivan Toshev
8	MF	BUL	Rusi Chernakov
9	MF	BUL	Emre Emin
10	FW	BUL	Angel Kostov
11	DF	BUL	Ivaylo Angelov
12	GK	BUL	Bogomil Tsintsarski

No.	Pos.	Nation	Player
13	DF	BUL	Nadim Angelov (on loan from Beroe)
14	DF	BUL	Veselin Penev
15	DF	BUL	Stanislav Belchev (captain)
17	MF	BUL	Kostadin Peev
18	MF	BUL	Plamen Stoyanov
19	MF	BUL	Soner Polat
20	MF	BUL	Ivaylo Marinov
21	MF	BUL	Alen Ivanov
22	MF	BUL	Kiril Lichev
