= List of Bulgarian football transfers summer 2020 =

This is a list of Bulgarian football transfers for the 2020 summer transfer window. Only transfers involving a team from the two professional leagues, First League and Second League are listed.

== First League ==
=== Arda ===
In:

No.	Pos.	Nation	Player
5	DF	BUL	Petko Ganev (from Litex)
8	DF	BUL	Milen Zhelev (from Beroe)
14	FW	CRO	Andrija Bubnjar (from (Slovenia) Mura)
15	MF	FRA	Moussa Haddad (from (France) Sochaux)
20	DF	BUL	Deyan Lozev (from Levski Sofia)
22	MF	CRO	Lovre Knežević (from (Slovenia) Beltinci)
24	DF	IRQ	Rebin Sulaka (from (Serbia) Radnički Niš)
33	MF	BUL	Ivan Tilev (from Septemvri Sofia)
36	GK	BUL	Vasil Simeonov (from Montana)
37	FW	BRA	Juninho (from (Brazil) Sport Recife)
80	MF	BUL	Lachezar Kotev (from Vitosha)

Out:

No.	Pos.	Nation	Player
5	DF	SRB	Zoran Gajić (to (Czech Republic) Zbrojovka Brno)
6	DF	ENG	Connor Randall (to (Scotland) Ross County)
8	MF	ARM	Rumyan Hovsepyan (to (Armenia) Alashkert)
9	FW	BUL	Eray Karadayi (on loan to Dobrudzha)
10	FW	BUL	Ahmed Osman (to Dimitrovgrad)
15	MF	BRA	Lucas Willian (released)
21	DF	BUL	Martin Kostadinov (on loan to Botev Vratsa)
22	DF	BUL	Atanas Krastev (to Haskovo)
24	DF	ALG	Ilias Hassani (to Beroe)
30	MF	BUL	Dimitar Atanasov (released)
33	DF	NED	Darren Sidoel (to (Spain) Córdoba)
45	FW	BEL	Elisha Sam (to (England) Notts County)
91	GK	BUL	Nikolay Bankov (to Septemvri Sofia)
99	FW	BUL	Radoslav Vasilev (to (Greece) Xanthi)

=== Beroe ===
In:

No.	Pos.	Nation	Player
1	GK	BUL	Hristiyan Vasilev (from Vitosha)
2	DF	BUL	Dzhuneyt Ali (from Neftochimic)
7	MF	BUL	Dimo Bakalov (from Ludogorets)
9	FW	CPV	Kukula (from (Portugal) Covilhã)
15	DF	BUL	Georgi Dinkov (from Spartak Varna)
18	DF	ALG	Ilias Hassani (from Arda)
21	MF	FRA	Keelan Lebon (from (France) Créteil)
29	MF	POR	Erivaldo (from (Portugal) Marítimo)
66	MF	BUL	Radoslav Apostolov (from Neftochimic)

Out:

No.	Pos.	Nation	Player
3	DF	BUL	Milen Zhelev (to Arda)
7	MF	CMR	Pierre Fonkeu (released)
9	FW	BUL	Martin Kamburov (to CSKA 1948)
14	MF	CIV	Yaya Meledje (to (Israel) Hapoel Hadera)
21	FW	SUI	Zoran Josipovic (released)
23	GK	BUL	Ivan Goshev (on loan to Yantra)
24	MF	BUL	Stoyan Ivanov (on loan to Yantra)
44	DF	BUL	Viktor Genev (to Botev Plovdiv)
59	DF	BEL	Ahmed Touba (loan return to (Belgium) Club Brugge)

=== Botev Plovdiv ===
In:

No.	Pos.	Nation	Player
4	DF	BUL	Viktor Genev (from Beroe)
6	DF	BRA	Marquinhos Pedroso (from (United States) D.C. United)
9	FW	BUL	Atanas Iliev (from Montana)
13	MF	FRA	Michel Espinosa (from (France) Lyon-Duchère)
17	FW	FRA	Salif Cissé (from Tsarsko Selo)
26	DF	MKD	Mite Cikarski (from (North Macedonia) Akademija Pandev)
81	FW	BUL	Kristian Dobrev (loan return from (Portugal) Porto B)
88	MF	BUL	Slavcho Shokolarov (from CSKA 1948)

Out:

No.	Pos.	Nation	Player
3	DF	BUL	Dimitar Pirgov (to CSKA 1948)
6	DF	BUL	Kostadin Nichev (to Botev Vratsa)
7	MF	BUL	Aleksandar Tonev (released)
9	FW	BRA	Anderson Barbosa (released)
10	MF	BUL	Stanislav Shopov (to (Netherlands) Heerenveen)
11	DF	BUL	Ivan Bandalovski (to Tsarsko Selo)
17	MF	BUL	Lachezar Baltanov (to Tsarsko Selo)
18	DF	BUL	Radoslav Terziev (to Slavia Sofia)
24	DF	BUL	Lazar Marin (to CSKA 1948)
26	MF	BUL	Atanas Stoimenov (on loan to Yantra)
39	MF	BUL	Antonio Vutov (to (Hungary) Mezőkövesdi SE)

=== Botev Vratsa ===
In:

No.	Pos.	Nation	Player
5	DF	BUL	Vasil Dobrev (from Slavia Sofia)
8	MF	POR	Pedro Lagoa (from Etar)
14	DF	BUL	Dimitar Burov (from Strumska Slava)
34	GK	RUS	Dar Korolev (from (Spain) Lorca)
77	DF	BUL	Martin Kostadinov (on loan from Arda)
94	MF	BUL	Yuliyan Nenov (from Dunav)
—	DF	BUL	Kostadin Nichev (from Botev Plovdiv)

Out:

No.	Pos.	Nation	Player
4	DF	BUL	Angel Lyaskov (loan return to CSKA Sofia)
5	DF	BUL	Petko Ganev (loan return to Litex)
8	MF	BUL	Dominik Yankov (loan return to Ludogorets)
11	DF	BUL	Andreas Vasev (to Minyor Pernik)
34	GK	BUL	Stamen Boyadzhiev (to Dimitrovgrad)
39	DF	BUL	Deyan Ivanov (loan return to Levski Sofia)

=== Cherno More ===
In:

No.	Pos.	Nation	Player
7	MF	POR	Rodrigo Vilela (from (Portugal) Torreense)
15	MF	POR	Leandro Andrade (from (Portugal) Fátima)
22	GK	BUL	Georgi Georgiev (from Levski Sofia)
28	DF	MKD	Vlatko Drobarov (from (India) Kerala Blasters)
29	MF	BEL	Faysel Kasmi (from (Belgium) URSL Visé)
70	MF	BUL	Stefan Velev (from (Romania) Sepsi)

Out:

No.	Pos.	Nation	Player
3	DF	BUL	Yordan Radev (on loan to Dobrudzha)
7	MF	CPV	Patrick Andrade (to (Azerbaijan) Qarabağ)
18	GK	SUI	Miodrag Mitrović (released)
20	MF	POR	Jordão Cardoso (to (Portugal) Amora)
44	DF	GRE	Dimitrios Chantakias (to (Azerbaijan) Zira)
77	MF	BUL	Petar Vutsov (on loan to Pirin Blagoevgrad)
90	FW	BUL	Martin Minchev (to (Czech Republic) Sparta Prague)
93	DF	NED	Fahd Aktaou (released)

=== CSKA Sofia ===
In:

No.	Pos.	Nation	Player
2	DF	NED	Jurgen Mattheij (from (Netherlands) Sparta Rotterdam)
13	MF	SEN	Younousse Sankharé (from (France) Bordeaux)
14	MF	GUI	Jules Keita (on loan from (France) Lens)
15	DF	FRA	Thibaut Vion (from (France) Chamois Niortais)
17	MF	VEN	Adalberto Peñaranda (on loan from (England) Watford)
21	MF	CTA	Amos Youga (from (France) Le Havre)
24	FW	ENG	Jerome Sinclair (on loan from (England) Watford)
25	GK	BUL	Dimitar Evtimov (from (England) Accrington Stanley)
30	MF	BUL	Georgi Yomov (from Slavia Sofia)
31	FW	BUL	Tonislav Yordanov (loan return from Etar)

Out:

No.	Pos.	Nation	Player
4	DF	BUL	Bozhidar Chorbadzhiyski (to (Poland) Stal Mielec)
5	MF	NED	Vurnon Anita (to (Netherlands) RKC Waalwijk)
6	MF	POR	Rúben Pinto (to (Hungary) Fehérvár)
7	MF	RUS	Denis Davydov (to (Russia) Tom Tomsk)
10	FW	BRA	Evandro (to (Hungary) Fehérvár)
14	MF	NGA	Viv Solomon-Otabor (to (England) Wigan Athletic)
15	MF	BUL	Kristiyan Malinov (to (Belgium) OH Leuven)
21	MF	GHA	Edwin Gyasi (to (Turkey) Samsunspor)
25	DF	ESP	Raúl Albentosa (released)
30	GK	LTU	Vytautas Černiauskas (to (Latvia) RFS)
—	DF	BUL	Angel Lyaskov (to (Slovenia) Olimpija, previously on loan at Botev)

=== CSKA 1948 ===
In:

No.	Pos.	Nation	Player
3	DF	BUL	Dimitar Pirgov (from Botev Plovdiv)
7	MF	BUL	Mario Topuzov (from Septemvri Simitli)
9	FW	BUL	Martin Kamburov (from Beroe)
14	DF	BUL	Dimitar Savov (from Minyor Pernik)
18	MF	BUL	Ivaylo Chochev (from (Italy) Pescara)
20	MF	BUL	Angel Bastunov (from Kariana)
24	DF	BUL	Lazar Marin (from Botev Plovdiv)
26	MF	BUL	Serkan Yusein (on loan from Ludogorets)
33	MF	BUL	Galin Ivanov (from Slavia Sofia)
70	MF	BUL	Georgi Rusev (from Septemvri Sofia)
87	DF	BUL	Simeon Petrov (from Strumska Slava)
—	MF	BUL	Georgi Mariyanov (from Litex)
—	MF	BUL	Tsvetomir Todorov (from Strumska Slava)

Out:

No.	Pos.	Nation	Player
6	DF	BUL	Denislav Mitsakov (to Strumska Slava)
7	MF	BUL	Boris Tyutyukov (to Litex)
9	MF	BUL	Kristiyan Peshov (to Septemvri Sofia)
13	DF	BUL	Kristian Nikolov (to Sportist)
14	DF	BUL	Ivaylo Todorov (to Hebar)
20	MF	BUL	Yanko Sandanski (to Vitosha Bistritsa)
27	MF	BUL	Milko Georgiev (to Oborishte)
30	DF	BUL	Dimo Atanasov (released)
71	DF	BUL	Aleksandar Georgiev (on loan to Strumska Slava)
88	MF	BUL	Slavcho Shokolarov (to Botev Plovdiv)
98	FW	BUL	Valentin Yoskov (on loan to Etar)
—	MF	BUL	Georgi Mariyanov (on loan to Strumska Slava)
—	MF	BUL	Tsvetomir Todorov (to Sozopol)

=== Etar ===
In:

No.	Pos.	Nation	Player
5	DF	ESP	Paco Puertas (on loan from (Spain) Fuenlabrada)
6	DF	BUL	Plamen Krachunov (from Lokomotiv Sofia)
8	MF	BUL	Ivan Mihaylov (from Chernomorets Balchik)
10	MF	BUL	Svilen Shterev (from Dunav Ruse)
18	MF	ARG	Nicolás Femia (from (Argentina) Villa Dálmine)
26	DF	BUL	Mariyan Ivanov (from Septemvri Sofia)
71	MF	BUL	Daniel Pehlivanov (from Hebar)
72	DF	EST	Mark Edur (from (Estonia) Tulevik)
83	MF	ANG	Aldaír Ferreira (from (Portugal) Cova da Piedade)
98	FW	BUL	Valentin Yoskov (on loan from CSKA 1948)
99	FW	BUL	Preslav Borukov (from (England) Sheffield Wednesday U23)

Out:

No.	Pos.	Nation	Player
8	MF	POR	Pedro Lagoa (to Botev Vratsa)
10	FW	ALB	Flo Bojaj (to (Germany) Kickers Offenbach)
14	DF	BUL	Ivan Skerlev (released)
19	FW	BUL	Tonislav Yordanov (loan return to CSKA Sofia)
23	DF	BUL	Aleksandar Dyulgerov (to Pirin Blagoevgrad)
31	MF	BUL	Krasimir Stanoev (to Pirin Blagoevgrad)
71	MF	BUL	Toni Ivanov (loan return to Slavia Sofia)
72	MF	BUL	Erol Dost (loan return to Ludogorets)
73	MF	BUL	Ivan Stoyanov (to Zagorets)
77	MF	SVN	Dino Martinović (end of contract)

=== Levski Sofia ===
In:

No.	Pos.	Nation	Player
2	DF	BUL	Alex Petkov (from (Scotland) Hearts)
3	DF	BUL	Zhivko Atanasov (from (Italy) Catanzaro)
9	FW	BUL	Steven Petkov (on loan from (Portugal) Feirense)
10	MF	BUL	Borislav Tsonev (from (Croatia) Inter Zaprešić)
12	GK	BUL	Nikolay Krastev (from Vitosha Bistritsa)
14	DF	BUL	Mateo Stamatov (from (Spain) UA Horta)
21	MF	BUL	Radoslav Tsonev (from (Italy) Lecce)
28	DF	FRA	Thomas Dasquet (from (France) Le Mans)
39	DF	BUL	Deyan Ivanov (loan return from Botev Vratsa)
41	DF	BUL	Georgi Aleksandrov (from Vitosha Bistritsa)
45	FW	BUL	Iliya Dimitrov (loan return from Vitosha Bistritsa)
66	DF	BUL	Orlin Starokin (from (Cyprus) Enosis Neon Paralimni)
86	FW	BUL	Valeri Bojinov (from (Italy) Pescara)
89	FW	BUL	Andrian Kraev (from Hebar)

Out:

No.	Pos.	Nation	Player
1	GK	MNE	Milan Mijatović (to (Hungary) MTK Budapest)
4	DF	BUL	Ivan Goranov (to (Belgium) Charleroi)
5	DF	ISL	Hólmar Örn Eyjólfsson (to (Norway) Rosenborg)
9	FW	AUT	Deni Alar (loan return to (Austria) Rapid Wien)
10	MF	ARG	Franco Mazurek (to (Greece) Panetolikos)
12	GK	BUL	Petar Ivanov (on loan to Neftochimic)
14	MF	POR	Filipe Nascimento (released)
15	MF	BUL	Martin Haydarov (released)
19	DF	GRE	Giannis Kargas (to (Greece) PAS Giannina)
20	DF	BUL	Zhivko Milanov (retired)
22	DF	POR	Nuno Reis (released)
23	MF	SEN	Khaly Thiam (to (Turkey) Altay)
26	DF	BUL	Deyan Lozev (to Arda)
27	GK	BUL	Georgi Georgiev (to Cherno More)
29	FW	BUL	Stanislav Kostov (to (Cyprus) Olympiakos Nicosia)
40	MF	NED	Stijn Spierings (to (France) Toulouse)
93	MF	BUL	Atanas Kabov (to Slavia Sofia)

=== Lokomotiv Plovdiv ===
In:

No.	Pos.	Nation	Player
4	DF	FRA	Christian Gomis (from (France) PSG II)
15	MF	CRO	Christian Ilić (from (Scotland) Motherwell)
19	FW	BUL	Georgi Minchev (from Tsarsko Selo)
50	MF	CRO	Filip Mihaljević (from (Croatia) Dinamo Zagreb)

Out:

No.	Pos.	Nation	Player
3	DF	NGA	Mustapha Abdullahi (released)
4	DF	NOR	Akinshola Akinyemi (to (Israel) Maccabi Netanya)
13	MF	CRO	Mihovil Klapan (to (Romania) UTA Arad)
19	MF	BRA	Wiris (released)
23	FW	CGO	Dominique Malonga (released)
50	DF	CRO	Josip Tomašević (to (Greece) Atromitos)
91	FW	BIH	Mirza Hasanbegović (released)
—	DF	BUL	Arhan Isuf (to Pirin, previously on loan at Spartak Varna)

=== Ludogorets ===
In:

No.	Pos.	Nation	Player
7	MF	BRA	Alex Santana (from (Brazil) Botafogo)
9	FW	ESP	Higinio Marín (from (Spain) Numancia)
10	MF	NED	Elvis Manu (from (China) Beijing Renhe)
11	FW	BUL	Kiril Despodov (on loan from (Italy) Cagliari)
24	DF	BEN	Olivier Verdon (on loan from (Spain) Alavés)
32	DF	POR	Josué Sá (from (Belgium) Anderlecht)
37	FW	GHA	Bernard Tekpetey (on loan from (Germany) Schalke 04)
64	MF	BUL	Dominik Yankov (loan return from Botev Vratsa)

Out:

No.	Pos.	Nation	Player
6	DF	ISR	Taleb Tawatha (to (Israel) Maccabi Haifa)
7	MF	BUL	Dimo Bakalov (to Beroe)
8	MF	ISR	Dan Biton (on loan to (Israel) Maccabi Tel Aviv)
10	FW	POL	Jakub Świerczok (on loan to (Poland) Piast Gliwice)
11	DF	BUL	Stanislav Manolev (to Pirin Blagoevgrad)
20	MF	BUL	Serkan Yusein (on loan to CSKA 1948)
84	MF	BUL	Marcelinho (to (Brazil) Vitória)
90	DF	BRA	Rafael Forster (to (Brazil) Botafogo)
92	MF	COD	Jody Lukoki (to (Turkey) Malatyaspor)

=== Montana ===
In:

No.	Pos.	Nation	Player
5	DF	FRA	Rayan Senhadji (from (France) Sochaux)
6	MF	BUL	Yanko Angelov (from Hebar)
7	MF	BUL	Ivelin Iliev (from Kariana)
9	FW	MAR	Bilal Bari (from (Romania) Concordia Chiajna)
15	DF	BUL	Preslav Petrov (from Ludogorets II)
24	DF	BEN	David Kiki (from (France) Brest)
25	DF	BUL	Aleksandar Bashliev (from Septemvri Sofia)
30	GK	BUL	Blagoy Makendzhiev (from Dunav Ruse)
—	GK	BUL	Filip Dimitrov (from Septemvri Sofia)

Out:

No.	Pos.	Nation	Player
5	DF	BUL	Kostadin Gadzhalov (to Yantra)
9	FW	BUL	Atanas Iliev (to Botev Plovdiv)
18	DF	BUL	Vanyo Ivanov (to Sportist)
24	DF	BUL	Preslav Petrov (to (Serbia) Grafičar Beograd)
26	MF	BUL	Borislav Damyanov (to Kariana)
55	GK	BUL	Vasil Simeonov (to Arda)
—	GK	BUL	Filip Dimitrov (to Septemvri Simitli)

=== Slavia Sofia ===
In:

No.	Pos.	Nation	Player
7	FW	BUL	Ventsislav Hristov (from (Romania) Concordia Chiajna)
8	FW	BUL	Dimitar Rangelov (from (Germany) Energie Cottbus)
17	DF	BUL	Radoslav Terziev (from Botev Plovdiv)
19	DF	MKD	Filip Antovski (on loan from (Croatia) Dinamo Zagreb)
93	MF	BUL	Atanas Kabov (from Levski Sofia)
—	GK	BUL	Ivan Dermendzhiev (from Botev Galabovo)

Out:

No.	Pos.	Nation	Player
6	DF	BUL	Vasil Dobrev (to Botev Vratsa)
9	FW	BUL	Tsvetelin Chunchukov (on loan to (Romania) Academica Clinceni)
16	DF	BUL	Konstantin Ivanov (on loan to Yantra)
32	GK	GRE	Antonis Stergiakis (to (England) Blackburn Rovers)
33	MF	BUL	Galin Ivanov (to CSKA 1948)
35	MF	BUL	Georgi Yomov (to CSKA Sofia)
—	GK	BUL	Ivan Dermendzhiev (on loan to Sportist)
—	DF	BUL	Martin Achkov (on loan to Septemvri, previously on loan at Spartak)
—	MF	BUL	Hristo Ivanov (on loan to Sportist, previously on loan at Spartak)
—	MF	BUL	Toni Ivanov (on loan to Yantra, previously on loan at Etar)

=== Tsarsko Selo ===
In:

No.	Pos.	Nation	Player
1	GK	BUL	Mihail Ivanov (from (Sweden) AFC Eskilstuna)
7	MF	CYP	Giannis Gerolemou (on loan from (Cyprus) AEL Limassol)
8	FW	CYP	Panagiotis Louka (from (Italy) Atalanta)
10	MF	BUL	Boris Galchev (from Septemvri Sofia)
11	MF	BUL	Lachezar Baltanov (from Botev Plovdiv)
14	MF	BUL	Bozhidar Vasev (from Hebar)
21	MF	BUL	Emanuil Manev (from Neftochimic)
22	DF	ANG	Luis Pedro (from (Netherlands) RKSV Leonidas)
25	MF	NED	Dylan Mertens (from (Netherlands) Koninklijke HFC)
93	DF	BUL	Ivan Bandalovski (from Botev Plovdiv)
98	FW	BUL	Stefan Hristov (from Dunav)
—	MF	BUL	Hristiyan Chipev (from (Germany) Hallescher U19)
—	DF	BUL	Vasil Bozhinov (from Vihren)
—	MF	FRA	Mohamed Brahimi (from (France) Vaulx)
—	FW	FRA	Salif Cissé (Free agent)

Out:

No.	Pos.	Nation	Player
2	DF	BRA	Léo Fioravanti (released)
7	MF	AUT	Edin Bahtić (released)
8	MF	BRA	Wesley Natã (to (Latvia) Riga FC)
10	FW	BUL	Georgi Minchev (to Lokomotiv Plovdiv)
11	MF	NED	Ludcinio Marengo (released)
12	GK	BUL	Martin Dimitrov (released)
14	MF	BUL	Simeon Mechev (released)
20	DF	BUL	Ivaylo Ivanov (to Vitosha Bistritsa)
21	DF	BUL	Rumen Gyonov (to Lokomotiv GO)
22	MF	CGO	Dylan Bahamboula (released)
26	DF	BUL	Iliya Dzhamov (released)
44	DF	ESP	Julio (to (Poland) Wisła Płock)
71	MF	BUL	Anton Karachanakov (to Pirin Blagoevgrad)
—	DF	BUL	Vasil Bozhinov (to Hebar)
—	MF	FRA	Mohamed Brahimi (released)
—	FW	FRA	Salif Cissé (to Botev Plovdiv)

== Second League ==
=== Dobrudzha ===
In:

No.	Pos.	Nation	Player
2	DF	BUL	Yordan Radev (on loan from Cherno More)
4	MF	BUL	Yakub Idrizov (from Pomorie)
5	DF	BUL	Tsvetelin Radev (from Botev Galabovo)
6	DF	BUL	Ahmed Ademov (from Pirin Blagoevgrad)
10	MF	BUL	Hristiyan Kazakov (from Pomorie)
17	MF	BUL	Tsvetan Iliev (from Chernomorets Balchik)
18	FW	BUL	Ivan Tsachev (from Neftochimic)
21	MF	BUL	Iliyan Kapitanov (from Litex)
23	MF	BUL	Doni Donchev (from Chernomorets Balchik)
88	MF	BUL	Erik Pochanski (from Neftochimic)
99	FW	BUL	Eray Karadayi (on loan from Arda)
—	MF	BUL	Ivaylo Lazarov (from Dunav)

Out:

No.	Pos.	Nation	Player
4	MF	BUL	Todor Palankov (released)
5	DF	BUL	Mihail Venkov (to Shumen)
9	FW	BUL	Kristian Peshkov (to Chernomorets Balchik)
10	MF	BUL	Yancho Andreev (to Spartak Varna)
—	MF	BUL	Ivaylo Lazarov (to Hebar)

=== Hebar ===
In:

No.	Pos.	Nation	Player
7	DF	BUL	Vasil Bozhinov (from Tsarsko Selo)
10	MF	BUL	Krasimir Iliev (from Arda)
11	MF	BUL	Yordan Todorov (from Rilski Sportist)
15	FW	BUL	Zhivko Petkov (from Neftochimic)
17	FW	BUL	Aleksandar Dimitrov (from Bratsigovo)
20	MF	BUL	Zhak Pehlivanov (from Lokomotiv GO)
22	DF	BUL	Ivaylo Todorov (from CSKA 1948)
29	DF	BUL	Todor Gochev (from Chernomorets Burgas)
39	DF	BUL	Zhivko Hadzhiev (from Chernomorets Burgas)
88	MF	BUL	Ivaylo Lazarov (from Dobrudzha)

Out:

No.	Pos.	Nation	Player
4	DF	BUL	Asen Georgiev (to Septemvri Sofia)
7	FW	BUL	Georgi Andonov (to Levski Karlovo)
8	MF	BUL	Andrian Kraev (to Levski Sofia)
10	FW	BUL	Veselin Marchev (released)
11	MF	BUL	Daniel Pehlivanov (to Etar)
15	DF	BUL	Dimitar Vezalov (released)
20	MF	BUL	Dimitar Zakonov (released)
22	DF	BUL	Georgi Stoichkov (released)
29	MF	BUL	Yanko Angelov (to Montana)
30	MF	BUL	Bozhidar Vasev (to Tsarsko Selo)
45	MF	BUL	Vladimir Gadzhev (end of contract)
88	MF	BUL	Yordan Apostolov (to Sportist)

=== Kariana ===
In:

No.	Pos.	Nation	Player
7	MF	BRA	Matheus Casarotto (from Belasitsa)
9	FW	SEN	Justino Mendes (from Belasitsa)
27	MF	BUL	Borislav Damyanov (from Montana)

Out:

No.	Pos.	Nation	Player
7	MF	BUL	Ivelin Iliev (to Montana)
9	FW	BUL	Redzheb Halil (to Minyor Pernik)
16	MF	BUL	Simeon Rusev (to Chernomorets Burgas)
30	MF	BUL	Angel Bastunov (to CSKA 1948)

=== Litex ===
In:

No.	Pos.	Nation	Player
5	MF	BUL	Yoan Baurenski (on loan from CSKA Sofia)
9	MF	BUL	Boris Tyutyukov (from CSKA 1948)
10	MF	BUL	Hristo Radkov (on loan from CSKA Sofia)
14	MF	BUL	Stefan Nedelchev (from Lokomotiv GO)
19	MF	BUL	Andrey Yordanov (on loan from CSKA Sofia)
21	MF	BUL	Ognyan Nikolov (on loan from CSKA Sofia)
24	GK	BUL	Iliya Shalamanov (on loan from CSKA Sofia)

Out:

No.	Pos.	Nation	Player
4	MF	BUL	Dzheyhan Zaydenov (to FC Kyustendil)
6	DF	BUL	Valentin Ivanov (to Chernomorets Burgas)
9	FW	BUL	Aleksandar Asparuhov (to Strumska Slava)
10	MF	BUL	Georgi Mariyanov (to CSKA 1948)
21	MF	BUL	Iliyan Kapitanov (to Dobrudzha)
24	GK	BUL	Martin Sheytanov (to Chernomorets Burgas)
99	GK	BUL	Petar Petrov (to Pirin Blagoevgrad)
—	DF	BUL	Petko Ganev (to Arda, previously on loan at Botev Vratsa)

=== Lokomotiv GO ===
In:

No.	Pos.	Nation	Player
1	GK	BUL	Hristiyan Hristov (from Chernomorets Balchik)
4	DF	BUL	Rumen Gyonov (from Tsarsko Selo)
5	DF	BUL	Todor Taushanov (from Chernomorets Balchik)
8	MF	BUL	Ivan Ivanov (from CSKA U19)
10	MF	BUL	Dzhuneyt Yashar (from Botev Galabovo)
11	MF	BUL	Viktor Mitev (from Chernomorets Balchik)
15	MF	BUL	Radoslav Baychev (from Sozopol)
18	DF	BUL	Petko Tsankov (from Dunav Ruse)
23	FW	BUL	Vladislav Mirchev (from Chernomorets Balchik)
31	MF	BUL	Aleksandar Stefanov (from Chernomorets Balchik)
—	DF	BUL	Atanas Tasholov (from Neftochimic)
—	DF	BUL	Plamen Tenev (from Neftochimic)
—	MF	BUL	Ivan Valchanov (from Pirin Blagoevgrad)
—	MF	BUL	Ivan Vinkov (from Botev Galabovo)

Out:

No.	Pos.	Nation	Player
4	DF	BUL	Ivo Harizanov (to Sportist)
5	MF	BUL	Valchan Chanev (to Neftochimic)
6	DF	BUL	Tihomir Trifonov (to Sevlievo)
7	FW	BUL	Nikola Kakamakov (to Pavlikeni)
8	MF	BUL	Georgi Yanev (to Sportist)
9	FW	BUL	Kaloyan Stefanov (to Sportist)
10	MF	BUL	Aykut Ramadan (to Sportist)
11	MF	BUL	Stefan Nedelchev (to Litex)
14	GK	BUL	Diyan Valkov (to Vitosha Bistritsa)
15	DF	BUL	Velichko Velichkov (to Maritsa Plovdiv)
18	FW	BUL	Deyan Hristov (to Vitosha Bistritsa)
19	MF	BUL	Dimitar Yurukov (to Maritsa Plovdiv)
20	MF	BUL	Zhak Pehlivanov (to Hebar)
33	GK	BUL	Ivaylo Vasilev (released)
77	MF	BUL	Tsvetomir Vachev (to Septemvri Sofia)
96	MF	BUL	Georgi Kolev (released)
—	DF	BUL	Atanas Tasholov (released)
—	DF	BUL	Plamen Tenev (released)
—	MF	BUL	Ivan Valchanov (to Minyor Pernik)
—	MF	BUL	Ivan Vinkov (to Neftochimic)

=== Lokomotiv Sofia ===
In:

No.	Pos.	Nation	Player
27	MF	BUL	Pavel Petkov (from Septemvri Sofia)
89	DF	BRA	Matheus Duarte (from (Portugal) Vila Real)

Out:

No.	Pos.	Nation	Player
12	DF	BRA	Choco (to Ludogorets II)
15	DF	SRB	Nemanja Ivanov (to (Serbia) Dubočica)
33	MF	BRA	Tom (released)
89	DF	BUL	Plamen Krachunov (to Etar)

=== Ludogorets II ===
In:

No.	Pos.	Nation	Player
20	DF	BRA	Choco (from Lokomotiv Sofia)

Out:

No.	Pos.	Nation	Player
87	DF	BUL	Preslav Petrov (to Montana)
91	MF	BUL	Stefan Metodiev (to Minyor Pernik)

=== Minyor Pernik ===
In:

No.	Pos.	Nation	Player
9	FW	BUL	Redzheb Halil (from Kariana)
13	MF	BUL	Georgi Netov (from Oborishte)
14	MF	BUL	Chetin Sadula (from Vitosha Bistritsa)
17	MF	BUL	Ivan Valchanov (from Lokomotiv GO)
20	DF	BUL	Andreas Vasev (from Botev Vratsa)
24	MF	BUL	Stefan Metodiev (from Ludogorets II)
30	MF	BUL	Yanko Sandanski (from Vitosha Bistritsa)

Out:

No.	Pos.	Nation	Player
14	DF	BUL	Dimitar Savov (to CSKA 1948)
17	FW	BUL	Yoan Marinov (to Balkan)

=== Neftochimic ===
In:

No.	Pos.	Nation	Player
1	GK	BUL	Plamen Kolev (from Sozopol)
3	DF	BUL	Todor Petkov (from Pomorie)
4	DF	BUL	Ali Ahmed (from Nesebar)
8	MF	BUL	Blagovest Danchev (on loan from Botev Plovdiv)
9	FW	BUL	Viktor Yanev (from Chernomorets Burgas)
10	FW	BUL	Oktay Yusein (from Lokomotiv Plovdiv)
11	MF	BUL	Zhivko Zhekov (from Chernomorets Burgas)
14	MF	BUL	Valchan Chanev (from Lokomotiv GO)
15	DF	BUL	Nikola Borisov (from Litex)
17	MF	BUL	Simeon Veshev (from Oborishte)
18	MF	BUL	Iliyan Yordanov (from Vitosha Bistritsa)
20	MF	BUL	Daniel Ivanov (from CSKA Sofia U19)
32	DF	BUL	Dimitar Balinov (on loan from Botev Plovdiv)
33	GK	BUL	Petar Ivanov (on loan from Levski Sofia)
71	MF	BUL	Ivan Vinkov (from Lokomotiv GO)
77	MF	BUL	Daniel Vasilev (from Levski Sofia U19)
92	DF	BUL	Galin Tashev (Free agent)
99	MF	BUL	Mario Yordanov (from Rilski Sportist)
—	DF	FRA	Bila Antonio (from Pirin Blagoevgrad)
—	DF	FRA	Redoine Aouchet (from (France) AG Caennaise)
—	MF	FRA	Gloire Antonio (from Pirin Blagoevgrad)
—	MF	FRA	Jessy Kasongo (Free agent)

Out:

No.	Pos.	Nation	Player
1	GK	BUL	Pavel Zdravkov (to Septemvri Sofia)
2	DF	BUL	Dzhuneyt Ali (to Beroe)
3	DF	BUL	Atanas Tasholov (to Lokomotiv GO)
4	DF	BUL	Plamen Tenev (to Lokomotiv GO)
8	MF	BUL	Emanuil Manev (to Tsarsko Selo)
9	FW	BUL	Ivan Kolev (to Sozopol)
10	MF	BUL	Miroslav Radev (to Chernomorets Burgas)
14	FW	BUL	Zhivko Petkov (to Hebar)
20	FW	BUL	Ivan Tsachev (to Dobrudzha)
23	DF	BUL	Diyan Moldovanov (to Sozopol)
33	GK	BUL	Rosen Andonov (to Sozopol)
66	MF	BUL	Radoslav Apostolov (to Beroe)
77	MF	BUL	Dimitar Kostadinov (to Septemvri Sofia)
92	MF	BUL	Erik Pochanski (to Dobrudzha)
99	MF	BUL	Kristiyan Parashkevov (to Sozopol)
—	DF	FRA	Bila Antonio (released)
—	DF	FRA	Redoine Aouchet (released)
—	MF	FRA	Gloire Antonio (released)
—	MF	FRA	Jessy Kasongo (released)

=== Pirin Blagoevgrad ===
In:

No.	Pos.	Nation	Player
5	DF	BUL	Nikolay Bodurov (from (Iran) Esteghlal)
7	MF	BUL	Petar Vutsov (on loan from Cherno More)
10	FW	ENG	George Oakley (from (Scotland) Hamilton Academical)
11	DF	BUL	Stanislav Manolev (from Ludogorets)
13	DF	BUL	Arhan Isuf (from Lokomotiv Plovdiv)
14	DF	BUL	Stilyan Nikolov (from Septemvri Sofia)
15	FW	FRA	John-Christophe Ayina (from (Italy) Nardò)
17	MF	BUL	Spas Georgiev (from Septemvri Sofia)
18	FW	BUL	Preslav Yordanov (from Septemvri Sofia)
31	MF	BUL	Krasimir Stanoev (from Etar)
38	DF	BUL	Aleksandar Dyulgerov (from Etar)
71	MF	BUL	Anton Karachanakov (from Tsarsko Selo)
99	GK	BUL	Petar Petrov (from Litex)

Out:

No.	Pos.	Nation	Player
2	DF	FRA	Bila Antonio (to Neftochimic)
4	DF	BUL	Ahmed Ademov (to Dobrudzha)
5	DF	BUL	Pavel Vidanov (released)
6	DF	BUL	Emil Petrov (to Septemvri Simitli)
7	MF	BUL	Ruslan Ivanov (to Septemvri Simitli)
8	FW	ENG	Ibrahim Meite (loan return to (England) Crawley Town)
10	MF	BUL	Ivan Valchanov (to Lokomotiv GO)
11	FW	BRA	Gabriel Pereira (released)
12	GK	BUL	Radoslav Angelski (to Bansko)
15	MF	BUL	Dimitar Blagov (to Strumska Slava)
20	MF	FRA	Gloire Antonio (to Neftochimic)
29	DF	GRE	Christos Kontochristos (to (Greece) Diagoras)
39	FW	BUL	Ivaylo Mihaylov (on loan to Septemvri Simitli)
87	GK	BUL	Veselin Ganev (to Vihren)

=== Septemvri Simitli ===
In:

No.	Pos.	Nation	Player
3	DF	BUL	Iliya Munin (from Bansko)
8	MF	BUL	Ruslan Ivanov (from Pirin Blagoevgrad)
9	MF	BUL	Zapro Dinev (from Vitosha)
17	MF	BUL	Iliya Karapetrov (from Bansko)
27	DF	BUL	Nikolay Stoilkov (from Vihren)
74	GK	BUL	Filip Dimitrov (from Montana)
88	FW	BUL	Ivaylo Mihaylov (on loan from Pirin Blagoevgrad)
—	DF	BUL	Emil Petrov (from Pirin Blagoevgrad)

Out:

No.	Pos.	Nation	Player
8	MF	BUL	Mario Topuzov (to CSKA 1948)
22	GK	BUL	Valentin Obretenov (on loan to Bansko)
27	DF	BUL	Boris Bozhinov (on loan to Bansko)
88	DF	BUL	Ivaylo Ivanov (to Pirin Razlog)
98	FW	BUL	Lachezar Dafkov (on loan to Pirin GD)

=== Septemvri Sofia ===
In:

No.	Pos.	Nation	Player
1	GK	BUL	Nikolay Bankov (from Arda)
4	DF	BUL	Ivan Arsov (from Pirin Razlog)
5	MF	BUL	Georgi Sarmov (from Vitosha Bistritsa)
6	DF	BUL	Asen Georgiev (from Hebar)
7	MF	BUL	Tsvetomir Vachev (from Lokomotiv GO)
10	MF	BUL	Dimitar Kostadinov (from Neftochimic)
11	DF	BUL	Asparuh Smilkov (from Botev Galabovo)
15	DF	BUL	Angel Granchov (from (North Macedonia) Akademija Pandev)
16	MF	BUL	Kristiyan Peshov (from CSKA 1948)
21	GK	BUL	Pavel Zdravkov (from Neftochimic)
22	FW	BUL	Kiril Kirov (from Levski Sofia U19)
23	DF	BUL	Martin Achkov (on loan from Slavia Sofia)

Out:

No.	Pos.	Nation	Player
1	GK	BUL	Valentin Galev (to Vitosha Bistritsa)
2	DF	BUL	Aleksandar Bashliev (to Montana)
3	DF	BUL	Rumen Sandev (to Strumska Slava)
6	DF	BUL	Yuliyan Popev (to Strumska Slava)
7	MF	BUL	Georgi Rusev (to CSKA 1948)
8	MF	BUL	Boris Galchev (to Tsarsko Selo)
9	FW	BUL	Preslav Yordanov (to Pirin Blagoevgrad)
10	MF	BUL	Asen Chandarov (to (Romania) Academica Clinceni)
11	MF	BUL	Ivan Tilev (to Arda)
12	GK	BUL	Filip Dimitrov (to Montana)
14	MF	BUL	Pavel Petkov (to Lokomotiv Sofia)
16	DF	BUL	Stilyan Nikolov (to Pirin Blagoevgrad)
17	MF	BUL	Spas Georgiev (to Pirin Blagoevgrad)
18	FW	BUL	Vladimir Nikolov (to (Germany) Würzburger Kickers)
23	DF	BUL	Vasil Popov (released)
26	DF	BUL	Mariyan Ivanov (to Etar)

=== Sozopol ===
In:

No.	Pos.	Nation	Player
5	DF	BUL	Georgi Radev (from (Kyrgyzstan) Dordoi Bishkek)
12	GK	BUL	Rosen Andonov (from Neftochimic)
14	DF	BUL	Rasim Syuleyman (from Levski Karlovo)
15	DF	BUL	Dimitar Zhekov (from Ludogorets U19)
20	MF	BUL	Tsvetomir Todorov (from CSKA 1948)
23	DF	BUL	Diyan Moldovanov (from Neftochimic)
27	FW	BUL	Ivan Kolev (from Neftochimic)
91	MF	BUL	Antonio Laskov (from Bangladesh Police)
99	MF	BUL	Kristiyan Parashkevov (from Neftochimic)

Out:

No.	Pos.	Nation	Player
12	GK	BUL	Plamen Kolev (to Neftochimic)
24	GK	BUL	Vladislav Velikin (released)
27	MF	BUL	Zhivko Dimov (to Nesebar)
30	MF	BUL	Radoslav Baychev (to Lokomotiv GO)
99	FW	BUL	Borislav Hadzhiev (to Levski Karlovo)

=== Sportist ===
In:

No.	Pos.	Nation	Player
1	GK	BUL	Stefano Kunchev (from Oborishte)
4	DF	BUL	Ivo Harizanov (from Lokomotiv GO)
5	DF	BUL	Vanyo Ivanov (from Montana)
6	MF	BUL	Hristo Ivanov (on loan from Slavia Sofia)
9	MF	BUL	Rangel Ignatov (from Oborishte)
10	MF	BUL	Aykut Ramadan (from Lokomotiv GO)
15	MF	BUL	Yordan Apostolov (from Hebar)
17	DF	BUL	Nikolay Tomov (from Spartak Varna)
18	FW	BUL	Deyan Hristov (from Vitosha Bistritsa)
20	MF	BUL	Martin Stankev (from Vitosha Bistritsa)
21	FW	BUL	Grigor Dolapchiev (from Dunav Ruse)
22	MF	BUL	Kristiyan Kochilov (from Vitosha Bistritsa)
23	FW	BUL	Kaloyan Stefanov (from Lokomotiv GO)
33	GK	BUL	Ivan Dermendzhiev (on loan from Slavia Sofia)
80	DF	BUL	Martin Mihaylov (from FC Kyustendil)
88	MF	BUL	Georgi Yanev (from Lokomotiv GO)
—	DF	BUL	Kristian Nikolov (from CSKA 1948)

Out:

No.	Pos.	Nation	Player
2	DF	BUL	Simeon Ivanov (to Balkan)
4	DF	BUL	Radoslav Iliev (released)
5	DF	BUL	Antoan Asenov (released)
10	MF	BUL	Daniel Vasev (to Oborishte)
11	MF	BUL	Kaloyan Angelov (released)
15	FW	BUL	Marian Hadzhiev (released)
16	MF	BUL	Kristiyan Petkov (released)
17	MF	BUL	Mihail Petrov (to Chavdar Etropole)
18	MF	BUL	Steven Kirilov (to Slivnishki Geroy)
21	FW	BUL	Vasil Kaloyanov (released)
22	MF	BUL	Stefan Alichkov (to Granit Vladaya)
33	GK	BUL	Stanislav Dimitrov (released)
—	DF	BUL	Kristian Nikolov (released)

=== Strumska Slava ===
In:

No.	Pos.	Nation	Player
1	GK	BUL	Tsvetelin Stavrev (from Levski Sofia U19)
3	DF	BUL	Rumen Sandev (from Septemvri Sofia)
4	DF	BUL	Lyubomir Graminov (from Belasitsa Petrich)
8	DF	BUL	Denislav Mitsakov (from CSKA 1948)
9	FW	BUL	Aleksandar Asparuhov (from Litex)
11	MF	BUL	Nikolay Ganchev (from Marek)
14	DF	BUL	Yuliyan Popev (from Septemvri Sofia)
15	MF	BUL	Dimitar Blagov (from Pirin Blagoevgrad)
19	MF	BUL	Georgi Mariyanov (on loan from CSKA 1948)

Out:

No.	Pos.	Nation	Player
4	DF	BUL	Simeon Petrov (to CSKA 1948)
7	FW	MKD	Andrian Chavoli (released)
9	FW	BUL	Lionel Matados (to Lokomotiv Mezdra)
11	MF	BUL	Tsvetomir Todorov (to CSKA 1948)
13	DF	BUL	Dimitar Burov (to Botev Vratsa)
88	DF	BUL	Iliyan Popov (to Yantra)

=== Vitosha ===
In:

No.	Pos.	Nation	Player
1	GK	BUL	Valentin Galev (from Septemvri Sofia)
6	DF	BUL	Ivaylo Ivanov (from Tsarsko Selo)
11	MF	BUL	Iliyan Yordanov (from Maritsa Plovdiv)
18	FW	BUL	Deyan Hristov (from Lokomotiv GO)
20	MF	BUL	Yanko Sandanski (from CSKA 1948)
33	GK	BUL	Diyan Valkov (from Lokomotiv GO)
41	DF	BUL	Georgi Aleksandrov (from Levski Sofia U19)
93	FW	BUL	Georgi Babaliev (from Ludogorets U19)

Out:

No.	Pos.	Nation	Player
1	GK	BUL	Hristiyan Vasilev (to Beroe)
6	MF	BUL	Stanislav Malamov (released)
8	MF	BUL	Georgi Sarmov (to Septemvri Sofia)
9	FW	BUL	Iliya Dimitrov (loan return to Levski Sofia)
11	MF	BUL	Daniel Kutev (to Rodopa Smolyan)
12	GK	BUL	Nikolay Krastev (to Levski Sofia)
17	MF	BUL	Zapro Dinev (to Septemvri Simitli)
18	DF	BUL	Apostol Popov (released)
20	MF	FRA	Aristote Madiani (released)
25	DF	BUL	Yordan Minev (to Spartak Plovdiv)
33	GK	BUL	Kristiyan Katsarev (released)
77	DF	BUL	Veselin Minev (released)
80	MF	BUL	Lachezar Kotev (to Arda)
88	MF	BUL	Martin Stankev (released)
93	MF	BUL	Atanas Kabov (loan return to Levski Sofia)

=== Yantra ===
In:

No.	Pos.	Nation	Player
4	DF	BUL	Iliyan Popov (from Strumska Slava)
5	DF	BUL	Kostadin Gadzhalov (from Montana)
9	MF	BUL	Emil Kolev (on loan from Botev Plovdiv)
10	MF	BUL	Ivaylo Ivanov (from Levski Sofia U19)
16	DF	BUL	Konstantin Ivanov (on loan from Slavia Sofia)
17	MF	BUL	Atanas Stoimenov (on loan from Botev Plovdiv)
21	MF	BUL	Stoyan Ivanov (on loan from Beroe)
23	GK	BUL	Ivan Goshev (on loan from Beroe)
25	DF	BUL	Hristo Mitev (from Zagorets)
71	MF	BUL	Toni Ivanov (on loan from Slavia Sofia)

Out:

No.	Pos.	Nation	Player
1	GK	BUL	Hristo Hristov (released)
6	MF	BUL	Delyan Donchev (on loan to Tryavna)
9	MF	BUL	Stefan Ivanov (to Sevlievo)
10	MF	BUL	Hristiyan Vasilev (to Sevlievo)
14	MF	BUL	Iliyan Tosunov (to Tryavna)
15	DF	BUL	Ilian Iliev (released)
20	DF	BUL	Hristo Tsonev (to Tryavna)
