= List of Bulgarian football transfers summer 2021 =

This is a list of Bulgarian football transfers for the 2021 summer transfer window. Only transfers involving a team from the two professional leagues, First League and Second League are listed.

== First League ==
=== Arda ===
In:

No.	Pos.	Nation	Player
10	MF	BUL	Svetoslav Kovachev (from Ludogorets)
16	MF	BUL	Emirdzhan Syuleyman (loan return from Dimitrovgrad)
18	DF	SRB	Slobodan Rubežić (from (Serbia) Čukarički)
25	DF	BUL	Krum Stoyanov (from Beroe)
77	MF	BUL	Iliya Yurukov (from Levski Sofia)
—	FW	BUL	Petar Hristov (loan return from Litex)

Out:

No.	Pos.	Nation	Player
13	DF	FRA	Nicolas Taravel (released)
14	DF	BUL	Stoycho Atanasov (to Lokomotiv Sofia)
22	DF	GRE	Manolis Roussakis (loan return to (Greece) Xanthi)
77	DF	BUL	Martin Kostadinov (on loan to Botev Vratsa)
—	FW	BUL	Petar Hristov (to Levski Krumovgrad)

=== Beroe ===
In:

No.	Pos.	Nation	Player
1	GK	NED	Nordin Bakker (from (Netherlands) Volendam)
3	DF	BUL	Miroslav Enchev (from Cherno More)
4	DF	BUL	Hristo Mitev (from Yantra)
5	DF	CIV	Oumar Sako (from (Qatar) Al Kharaitiyat)
10	MF	BUL	Daniel Genov (from Botev Vratsa)
12	GK	BUL	Ivan Goshev (loan return from Yantra)
16	MF	BUL	Simeon Mechev (from Tsarsko Selo)
17	MF	BUL	Reyan Daskalov (from Tsarsko Selo)
26	DF	BUL	Kamen Hadzhiev (from (Hungary) Puskás Akadémia)
27	MF	MLI	Aboubacar Toungara (from (Morocco) AS FAR)
30	MF	BUL	Serkan Yusein (on loan from Ludogorets)
43	DF	BRA	Johnathan (from Botev Plovdiv)
91	FW	BUL	Oldzhay Aliev (from Maritsa Plovdiv)
99	MF	MTN	Oumar Camara (from (France) Sète)
—	MF	BUL	Stoyan Ivanov (loan return from Yantra)

Out:

No.	Pos.	Nation	Player
1	GK	BUL	Hristiyan Vasilev (to Tsarsko Selo)
5	DF	FRA	Teddy Mézague (to (Turkey) Eyüpspor)
7	MF	BUL	Dimo Bakalov (to Tsarsko Selo)
10	MF	CGO	Gaius Makouta (loan return to (Portugal) Braga)
12	GK	SVK	Dušan Perniš (retired)
17	MF	GUI	Ibrahima Conté (to (Israel) Bnei Sakhnin)
18	DF	ALG	Ilias Hassani (to (Qatar) Al-Shahania)
22	MF	BRA	Octávio (to Lokomotiv Sofia)
25	DF	BUL	Georgi Angelov (to CSKA 1948)
27	DF	BUL	Krum Stoyanov (to Arda)
29	MF	POR	Erivaldo (to (Kazakhstan) Taraz)
66	MF	BUL	Radoslav Apostolov (to Etar)
73	MF	BUL	Ivan Minchev (to (North Macedonia) Bregalnica Štip)

=== Botev Plovdiv ===
In:

No.	Pos.	Nation	Player
6	MF	NED	Dylan Mertens (from Tsarsko Selo)
13	GK	AUT	Hidajet Hankič (from (Romania) Botoșani)
17	MF	BUL	Nikolay Minkov (from Montana)
18	DF	FRA	Samuel Souprayen (from (France) Auxerre)
20	FW	FRA	Antoine Baroan (from (France) Chamois Niortais)
—	MF	BUL	Dimitar Proychev (loan return from (Denmark) Fremad Amager)
—	MF	BUL	Atanas Stoimenov (loan return from Yantra)
—	MF	BUL	Emil Kolev (loan return from Yantra)
—	FW	BUL	Ivan Vasilev (loan return from (Denmark) Fremad Amager)
77	MF	BUL	Petar Vutsov (from Slavia Sofia)
35	MF	CMR	James Eto'o (from (France) US Boulogne)

Out:

No.	Pos.	Nation	Player
1	GK	BUL	Yanko Georgiev (to Tsarsko Selo)
9	FW	BUL	Atanas Iliev (to (Italy) Ascoli)
10	MF	BUL	Slavcho Shokolarov (released)
13	MF	FRA	Michel Espinosa (released)
17	FW	FRA	Salif Cissé (released)
19	DF	NOR	Anwar Elyounoussi (on loan to (Denmark) Fremad Amager)

=== Botev Vratsa ===
In:

No.	Pos.	Nation	Player
2	DF	BUL	Valeri Hristov (from Montana)
6	MF	BUL	Antonio Georgiev (from Tsarsko Selo)
19	DF	BUL	Martin Kostadinov (on loan from Arda)
21	MF	POR	Serginho (from (Portugal) Sintrense)
30	DF	POR	Gonçalo Vieira (from (Portugal) Sintrense)
37	MF	BUL	Nikola Gavov (Free agent)
88	MF	BUL	Yoan Baurenski (on loan from CSKA Sofia)
—	MF	BUL	Ivan Mitrev (on loan from CSKA Sofia)

Out:

No.	Pos.	Nation	Player
6	MF	BUL	Daniel Gadzhev (released)
9	MF	BUL	Daniel Genov (released)
10	FW	BUL	Petar Atanasov (to Tsarsko Selo)
24	MF	FRA	Alassane N'Diaye (released)
28	MF	BUL	Hristo Zlatinski (retired)
30	FW	BUL	Valeri Domovchiyski (to Maritsa Plovdiv)
37	DF	BUL	Ventsislav Kerchev (to Slavia Sofia)
81	DF	BUL	Atanas Zehirov (released)
—	MF	LBN	Samir Ayass (to (Malaysia) Perak)

=== Cherno More ===
In:

No.	Pos.	Nation	Player
3	DF	BUL	Zhivko Atanasov (from Levski Sofia)
11	FW	GUI	Fodé Guirassy (from (France) Orléans)
31	MF	BUL	Lachezar Yordanov (loan return from Sozopol)
41	DF	BEL	Sami El Anabi (from (Spain) Real Avilés)
—	DF	BUL	Yordan Radev (loan return from Dobrudzha)

Out:

No.	Pos.	Nation	Player
10	MF	BUL	Ilian Iliev Jr. (to (Cyprus) Apollon Limassol)

=== CSKA Sofia ===
In:

No.	Pos.	Nation	Player
6	MF	FRA	Junior Nzila (on loan from (Switzerland) Chiasso)
7	MF	FRA	Yohan Baï (from (France) Canet Roussillon)
11	FW	BIH	Hamza Čataković (from (Slovakia) Trenčín)
14	FW	BUL	Kaloyan Krastev (from Slavia Sofia)
20	DF	EST	Karol Mets (from (Saudi Arabia) Ettifaq)
23	FW	BUL	Ahmed Ahmedov (loan return from (Azerbaijan) Neftçi Baku)
24	MF	CRO	Karlo Muhar (on loan from (Poland) Lech Poznań)
26	DF	BUL	Valentin Antov (loan return from (Italy) Bologna)
29	DF	FIN	Thomas Lam (from (Netherlands) Zwolle)
30	MF	NED	Yanic Wildschut (from (Israel) Maccabi Haifa)
—	GK	BUL	Ivaylo Iliev (loan return from Litex)
—	GK	BUL	Iliya Shalamanov-Trenkov (loan return from Litex)
—	MF	BUL	Yoan Baurenski (loan return from Litex)
—	MF	BUL	Emil Tsenov (loan return from Litex)
—	MF	BUL	Hristo Radkov (loan return from Litex)
—	MF	BUL	Ivan Mitrev (loan return from Litex)
—	MF	BUL	Andrey Yordanov (loan return from FC Kyustendil)

Out:

No.	Pos.	Nation	Player
7	MF	BRA	Henrique (to (Portugal) Marítimo)
9	FW	VEN	Adalberto Peñaranda (loan return to (England) Watford)
11	DF	BUL	Petar Zanev (to Pirin Blagoevgrad)
14	MF	GUI	Jules Keita (loan return to (France) Lens)
14	MF	BUL	Mitko Mitkov (loan return from Litex)
20	MF	POR	Tiago (to (Saudi Arabia) Al-Hazem)
20	DF	BUL	Hristiyan Petrov (loan return from Litex)
22	FW	GAM	Ali Sowe (to (Russia) Rostov, previously on loan)
22	FW	BUL	Radoslav Zhivkov (loan return from Litex)
24	FW	ENG	Jerome Sinclair (loan return to (England) Watford)
26	DF	BUL	Valentin Antov (on loan to (Italy) Monza)
27	MF	BUL	Martin Smolenski (on loan to Minyor Pernik)
—	MF	BUL	Yoan Baurenski (on loan to Botev Vratsa)
—	MF	BUL	Ivan Mitrev (on loan to Botev Vratsa)
—	DF	BUL	Aleksandar Buchkov (on loan to Litex Lovech)
—	DF	BUL	Kristiyan Atanasov (on loan to Litex Lovech)
—	MF	BUL	Kaloyan Stoilov (on loan to Litex Lovech)
—	FW	BUL	Mark-Emilio Papazov (on loan to Litex Lovech)
—	GK	BUL	Iliya Shalamanov-Trenkov (on loan to Litex Lovech)

=== CSKA 1948 ===
In:

No.	Pos.	Nation	Player
22	DF	BUL	Dimitar Iliev (from Ludogorets II)
44	DF	BUL	Kostadin Iliev (from Levski Sofia)
61	MF	BUL	Steliyan Dobrev (from Slavia Sofia)
98	FW	BUL	Valentin Yoskov (loan return from Etar)
—	DF	BUL	Aleksandar Georgiev (loan return from Strumska Slava)
—	DF	BUL	Bogdan Kostov (from Levski Sofia)
—	MF	BUL	Georgi Mariyanov (loan return from Strumska Slava)

Out:

No.	Pos.	Nation	Player
9	FW	BUL	Dimitar Mitkov (loan return to Ludogorets)
10	MF	BUL	Vasil Shopov (to Tsarsko Selo)
14	DF	BUL	Dimitar Savov (released)
21	DF	BUL	Ventsislav Vasilev (to Tsarsko Selo)
25	DF	BUL	Sasho Aleksandrov (to Tsarsko Selo)
26	MF	BUL	Serkan Yusein (loan return to Ludogorets)

=== Levski Sofia ===
In:

No.	Pos.	Nation	Player
3	DF	MKD	Gjoko Zajkov (from (Belgium) Charleroi)
4	DF	BUL	Ivan Goranov (on loan from (Belgium) Charleroi)
5	DF	CYP	Christos Shelis (from (Cyprus) APOEL)
7	MF	BUL	Georgi Milanov (free agent)
20	MF	BUL	Dimitar Kostadinov (from Septemvri Sofia)
33	DF	PAN	José Córdoba (on loan from Etar)
—	DF	BUL	Hristofor Hubchev (from Etar)

Out:

No.	Pos.	Nation	Player
1	GK	CRO	Zvonimir Mikulić (to (Turkey) Tuzlaspor)
3	DF	BUL	Zhivko Atanasov (to Cherno More)
4	MF	BUL	Martin Raynov (to (Israel) Ashdod)
9	FW	BUL	Steven Petkov (loan return to (Portugal) Feirense)
12	GK	BUL	Nikolay Krastev (end of contract)
14	DF	BUL	Mateo Stamatov (to (Russia) Orenburg)
15	DF	BUL	Bogdan Kostov (to CSKA 1948)
20	DF	ESP	Nacho Monsalve (to (Poland) ŁKS Łódź)
31	DF	BUL	Kostadin Iliev (to CSKA 1948)
45	FW	BUL	Iliya Dimitrov (to Lokomotiv Sofia)
70	FW	BUL	Ivaylo Hristov (to Sportist Svoge)
77	MF	BUL	Iliya Yurukov (to Arda)
86	FW	BUL	Valeri Bojinov (released)
—	GK	BUL	Petar Ivanov (to Yantra)
—	DF	BUL	Hristofor Hubchev (to Pirin Blagoevgrad)

=== Lokomotiv Plovdiv ===
In:

No.	Pos.	Nation	Player
2	DF	UKR	Oleksiy Bykov (on loan from (Ukraine) Mariupol)
5	DF	BUL	Martin Paskalev (from Spartak Varna)
6	MF	BUL	Emil Yanchev (from Cherno More)
7	DF	NED	Shaquill Sno (from (Norway) Aalesund)
20	DF	SRB	Miloš Petrović (from (Greece) Xanthi)
25	DF	MDA	Artur Crăciun (on loan from (Hungary) Budapest Honvéd)
28	MF	BUL	Ayvan Angelov (from Belasitsa)
61	MF	FRA	Vincent Marcel (free agent)
71	GK	GER	Lukas Raeder (from (Germany) VfB Lübeck)

Out:

No.	Pos.	Nation	Player
5	DF	MOZ	David Malembana (released)
6	MF	CRO	Christian Ilić (released)
7	MF	BUL	Momchil Tsvetanov (to (South Korea) Gangwon FC)
22	GK	BUL	Ivaylo Vasilev (to Hebar)
25	DF	ARG	Lucas Masoero (to (Russia) Nizhny Novgorod)
61	DF	POR	Dinis Almeida (to (Belgium) Antwerp)
71	GK	BUL	Martin Lukov (to (Saudi Arabia) Al-Tai)

=== Lokomotiv Sofia ===
In:

No.	Pos.	Nation	Player
5	DF	GRE	Giorgos Katsikas (free agent)
6	DF	BUL	Plamen Krachunov (from Etar)
8	MF	BUL	Hristo Ivanov (from Septemvri Simitli)
9	FW	ALG	Karim Bouhmidi (from (France) Olympique Saint-Quentin)
11	MF	SUI	Raël Lolala (from Neftochimic)
13	DF	POR	Celso Raposo (from (Iceland) Vestri)
14	MF	BUL	Hristiyan Chipev (from Tsarsko Selo)
19	FW	BUL	Iliya Dimitrov (from Levski Sofia)
24	GK	BUL	Aleksandar Lyubenov (from Hebar)
44	MF	BUL	Bozhidar Katsarov (from Etar)
58	MF	BRA	Octávio (from Beroe)
99	MF	BRA	Jonata Machado (from (Brazil) Botafogo SP)

Out:

No.	Pos.	Nation	Player
2	DF	BRA	Pedro Ferrari (end of contract)
8	MF	BUL	Nikolay Tsvetkov (end of contract)
10	MF	BUL	Tomislav Pavlov (end of contract)
11	FW	BUL	Georgi Babaliev (to Spartak Varna)
18	FW	BUL	Svetoslav Dikov (end of contract)
21	GK	BUL	Bozhidar Mitrev (released)
27	DF	BUL	Deyan Ivanov (end of contract)
89	DF	BRA	Matheus Duarte (end of contract)

=== Ludogorets ===
In:

No.	Pos.	Nation	Player
1	GK	NED	Sergio Padt (from (Netherlands) Groningen)
6	DF	SUR	Shaquille Pinas (from (Netherlands) ADO Den Haag)
8	MF	POR	Claude Gonçalves (from (Portugal) Gil Vicente)
11	FW	BUL	Kiril Despodov (from (Italy) Cagliari, previously on loan)
24	DF	BEN	Olivier Verdon (from (Spain) Alavés, previously on loan)
29	MF	ROU	Dorin Rotariu (from (Kazakhstan) Astana)
30	DF	UKR	Ihor Plastun (from (Belgium) Gent)
37	MF	GHA	Bernard Tekpetey (from (Germany) Schalke 04, previously on loan)
45	FW	BUL	Dimitar Mitkov (loan return CSKA 1948)
71	GK	CRO	Kristijan Kahlina (from (Croatia) HNK Gorica, previously on loan)

Out:

No.	Pos.	Nation	Player
18	MF	BUL	Svetoslav Dyakov (to Pirin Blagoevgrad)
21	DF	ROU	Dragoș Grigore (end of contract)
27	GK	BUL	Vladislav Stoyanov (retired)
30	DF	ROU	Cosmin Moți (retired)
98	MF	BUL	Svetoslav Kovachev (to Arda)
—	MF	BUL	Serkan Yusein (on loan to Beroe, previously on loan to CSKA 1948)
—	FW	POL	Jakub Świerczok (to (Poland) Piast Gliwice, previously on loan)
—	FW	BRA	Júnior Brandão (on loan to (Brazil) CRB, previously on loan to (Portugal) Rio Ave)

=== Pirin Blagoevgrad ===
In:

No.	Pos.	Nation	Player
3	DF	BUL	Petar Zanev (from CSKA Sofia)
7	FW	ALG	Mohamed Brahimi (from Neftochimic)
18	MF	BUL	Svetoslav Dyakov (from Ludogorets)
29	FW	BUL	Stanislav Kostov (from (Cyprus) Olympiakos Nicosia)
—	FW	BUL	Ivaylo Mihaylov (loan return from Septemvri Simitli)

Out:

No.	Pos.	Nation	Player
3	DF	BUL	Aleksandar Bastunov (released)
9	FW	BUL	Vladislav Zlatinov (released)
13	DF	BUL	Arhan Isuf (to Spartak Varna)
15	MF	FRA	John-Christophe Ayina (released)
22	DF	BUL	Dimitar Mitev (released)
—	FW	BUL	Ivaylo Mihaylov (to Hebar)

=== Slavia Sofia ===
In:

No.	Pos.	Nation	Player
4	DF	FRA	Ludovic Soares (from (France) Laval)
37	DF	BUL	Ventsislav Kerchev (from Botev Vratsa)
88	MF	BUL	Toni Tasev (from Montana)

Out:

No.	Pos.	Nation	Player
11	MF	BUL	Vladislav Uzunov (released)
14	FW	BUL	Ivaylo Dimitrov (released)
19	DF	MKD	Filip Antovski (loan return to (Croatia) Dinamo Zagreb)
70	MF	BUL	Mihail Aleksandrov (released)
75	MF	TUN	Nader Ghandri (loan return to (Belgium) Westerlo)
89	MF	BUL	Steliyan Dobrev (to CSKA 1948)

=== Tsarsko Selo ===
In:

No.	Pos.	Nation	Player
1	GK	BUL	Yanko Georgiev (from Botev Plovdiv)
7	MF	BUL	Dimo Bakalov (from Beroe)
9	FW	BUL	Milcho Angelov (from Etar)
12	MF	BRA	Lucas Dias (from (Czech Republic) FC Vlašim)
13	GK	BUL	Hristiyan Vasilev (from Beroe)
20	MF	BUL	Petar Atanasov (from Botev Vratsa)
22	MF	SRB	Milan Jokić (from (Serbia) Metalac GM)
21	DF	BUL	Ventsislav Vasilev (from CSKA 1948)
25	DF	BUL	Sasho Aleksandrov (from CSKA 1948)
29	FW	GAB	Gaëtan Missi Mezu (from Etar)
93	MF	BUL	Vasil Shopov (from CSKA 1948)

Out:

No.	Pos.	Nation	Player
17	DF	BUL	Reyan Daskalov (to Beroe)
20	MF	BUL	Dimitar Kostadinov (loan return to Septemvri Sofia)
25	MF	NED	Dylan Mertens (to Botev Plovdiv)
30	GK	HAI	Johny Placide (to (France) Bastia)

== Second League ==
=== Botev Plovdiv II ===
In:

No.	Pos.	Nation	Player

Out:

No.	Pos.	Nation	Player

=== CSKA 1948 II ===
In:

No.	Pos.	Nation	Player
—	FW	BUL	Yasen Tsekov (from CSKA Sofia U17)

Out:

No.	Pos.	Nation	Player

=== Dobrudzha ===
In:

No.	Pos.	Nation	Player

Out:

No.	Pos.	Nation	Player
2	DF	BUL	Yordan Radev (loan return to Cherno More)
99	FW	BUL	Eray Karadayi (loan return to Arda)

=== Etar ===
In:

No.	Pos.	Nation	Player

Out:

No.	Pos.	Nation	Player
5	DF	ESP	Paco Puertas (loan return to (Spain) Fuenlabrada)
6	DF	BUL	Plamen Krachunov (to Lokomotiv Sofia)
7	FW	BUL	Milcho Angelov (to Tsarsko Selo)
10	FW	GAB	Gaëtan Missi Mezu (to Tsarsko Selo)
23	DF	BUL	Hristofor Hubchev (to Levski Sofia)

=== Hebar ===
In:

No.	Pos.	Nation	Player
—	GK	BUL	Ivaylo Vasilev (from Lokomotiv Plovdiv)
—	DF	BUL	Martin Mihaylov (from Sportist Svoge)
—	DF	BUL	Aleksandar Bastunov (from Pirin Blagoevgrad)
—	MF	BUL	Oleg Dimitrov (from Litex)
—	MF	BUL	Emanuil Manev (from Tsarsko Selo)
—	FW	BUL	Ivaylo Mihaylov (from Pirin Blagoevgrad)

Out:

No.	Pos.	Nation	Player
2	DF	BUL	Vasil Gerov (retired)
3	DF	BUL	Atanas Tasholov (released)
7	MF	BUL	Stanislav Manevski (released)
10	MF	BUL	Krasimir Iliev (released)
11	MF	BUL	Yordan Todorov (released)
14	DF	BUL	Nikolay Dichev (to Etar)
28	MF	BUL	Nikolay Yankov (to Etar)
29	DF	BUL	Todor Gochev (released)
39	DF	BUL	Zhivko Hadzhiev (released)
88	MF	BUL	Ivaylo Lazarov (released)
95	GK	BUL	Aleksandar Lyubenov (to Lokomotiv Sofia)

=== Levski Lom ===
In:

No.	Pos.	Nation	Player
18	DF	BUL	Vanyo Ivanov (from Sportist Svoge)
14	MF	FRA	Damien Marie (from (Slovakia) Slavoj Trebišov)
—	FW	BUL	Racho Rachev (from Levski Sofia U19)
9	FW	BUL	Andon Gushterov (from Pirin Blagoevgrad)
8	FW	BUL	Daniel Kutev (from Rodopa Smolyan)
17	FW	COD	Grace Tanda (from (Sweden) Vasalund)
—	DF	MKD	Viktor Markovski (from (North Macedonia) Kamenica Sasa)
21	MF	MLI	Mohamed Sylla (from Bdin Vidin)
—	MF	BUL	Daniel Pehlivanov (from Vihren Sandanski)

Out:

No.	Pos.	Nation	Player
2	DF	BUL	Aleks Georgiev (to Spartak Pleven)
3	DF	BUL	Lachezar Kovachev (to Spartak Pleven)
8	FW	BUL	Martin Dinov (to Botev Ihtiman)
14	FW	BUL	Rangel Abushev (free agent)
18	MF	BUL	Nikolay Nikolov (to Montana)
—	MF	BUL	Bobi Simeonov (to Drenovets)
17	MF	BUL	Pier Pierov (to Drenovets)
19	FW	BUL	Petko Petkov (free agent)
21	MF	BUL	Mariyan Ognyanov (free agent)

=== Litex Lovech ===
In:

No.	Pos.	Nation	Player

Out:

No.	Pos.	Nation	Player
5	MF	BUL	Yoan Baurenski (loan return to CSKA Sofia)
8	FW	BUL	Petar Hristov (loan return to Arda)
10	MF	BUL	Hristo Radkov (loan return to CSKA Sofia)
15	DF	BUL	Hristiyan Petrov (loan return to CSKA Sofia)
19	MF	BUL	Andrey Yordanov (loan return to CSKA Sofia)
21	MF	BUL	Ognyan Nikolov (loan return to CSKA Sofia)
23	MF	BUL	Ivan Mitrev (loan return to CSKA Sofia)
24	GK	BUL	Iliya Shalamanov (loan return to CSKA Sofia)
34	MF	BUL	Oleg Dimitrov (to Hebar)

=== Ludogorets II ===
In:

No.	Pos.	Nation	Player

Out:

No.	Pos.	Nation	Player
31	DF	BUL	Georgi Valchev (to Dunav Ruse)
58	DF	BUL	Dimitar Iliev (to CSKA 1948)

=== Marek Dupnitsa ===
In:

No.	Pos.	Nation	Player

Out:

No.	Pos.	Nation	Player

=== Maritsa ===
In:

No.	Pos.	Nation	Player

Out:

No.	Pos.	Nation	Player

=== Minyor Pernik ===
In:

No.	Pos.	Nation	Player

Out:

No.	Pos.	Nation	Player

=== Montana ===
In:

No.	Pos.	Nation	Player

Out:

No.	Pos.	Nation	Player
11	MF	BUL	Nikolay Minkov (to Botev Plovdiv)
24	DF	BEN	David Kiki (to Arda Kardzhali)

=== Neftochimic ===
In:

No.	Pos.	Nation	Player

Out:

No.	Pos.	Nation	Player
8	MF	BUL	Blagovest Danchev (loan return to Botev Plovdiv)
10	FW	ALG	Mohamed Brahimi (to Pirin Blagoevgrad)
32	DF	BUL	Dimitar Balinov (loan return to Botev Plovdiv)

=== Septemvri Simitli ===
In:

No.	Pos.	Nation	Player
—	GK	BUL	Valentin Obretenov (loan return from Bansko)
—	DF	BUL	Boris Bozhinov (loan return from Bansko)
—	FW	BUL	Lachezar Dafkov (loan return from Pirin Gotse Delchev)

Out:

No.	Pos.	Nation	Player
88	FW	BUL	Ivaylo Mihaylov (loan return to Pirin Blagoevgrad)

=== Septemvri Sofia ===
In:

No.	Pos.	Nation	Player
—	MF	BUL	Dimitar Kostadinov (loan return from Tsarsko Selo)

Out:

No.	Pos.	Nation	Player
23	DF	BUL	Martin Achkov (loan return to Slavia Sofia)
—	MF	BUL	Dimitar Kostadinov (to Levski Sofia)

=== Sozopol ===
In:

No.	Pos.	Nation	Player

Out:

No.	Pos.	Nation	Player
—	MF	BUL	Lachezar Yordanov (loan return to Cherno More)

=== Spartak Varna ===
In:

No.	Pos.	Nation	Player
—	GK	BUL	Stanislav Nistorov (from Litex Lovech)
—	DF	BUL	Arhan Isuf (from Pirin Blagoevgrad)
—	MF	BUL	Aleksandar Stefanov (from Lokomotiv Gorna Oryahovitsa)
—	MF	BUL	Viktor Mitev (from Lokomotiv Gorna Oryahovitsa)
—	MF	BUL	Tsvetan Iliev (from Dobrudzha)
—	MF	BUL	Daniel Nachev (from Levski Sofia U19)
—	FW	BUL	Vladislav Mirchev (from Lokomotiv GO)
—	FW	BUL	Georgi Babaliev (from Lokomotiv Sofia)
—	FW	BUL	Georgi Bozhilov (from Botev Ihtiman)

Out:

No.	Pos.	Nation	Player
5	DF	BUL	Martin Paskalev (to Lokomotiv Plovdiv)
9	FW	CRO	Ante Bačkov (released)
13	DF	BUL	Kristian Varbanov (to CSKA 1948)

=== Sportist Svoge ===
In:

No.	Pos.	Nation	Player
11	FW	BUL	Ivaylo Hristov (from Levski Sofia)

Out:

No.	Pos.	Nation	Player

=== Strumska Slava ===
In:

No.	Pos.	Nation	Player

Out:

No.	Pos.	Nation	Player
19	MF	BUL	Georgi Mariyanov (loan return to CSKA 1948)
88	MF	BUL	Aleksandar Georgiev (loan return to CSKA 1948)

=== Yantra ===
In:

No.	Pos.	Nation	Player
23	GK	BUL	Petar Ivanov (from Levski Sofia)

Out:

No.	Pos.	Nation	Player
9	FW	BUL	Emil Kolev (loan return to Botev Plovdiv)
12	GK	BUL	Nikolay Georgiev (retired)
16	DF	BUL	Konstantin Ivanov (loan return to Slavia Sofia)
17	MF	BUL	Atanas Stoimenov (loan return to Botev Plovdiv)
21	MF	BUL	Stoyan Ivanov (loan return to Beroe)
23	GK	BUL	Ivan Goshev (loan return to Beroe)
71	MF	BUL	Toni Ivanov (loan return to Slavia Sofia)
