= Stoyan Ivanov =

Stoyan Ivanov may refer to:

- Stoyan Nikolov (Stoyan Nikolov Ivanov), Bulgarian wrestler
- Stoyan Ivanov (footballer), Bulgarian footballer
