= Vutsov =

Vutsov is a Bulgarian surname Вуцов. Notable people with the surname include:

- Ivan Vutsov (1939–2019), Bulgarian footballer and manager
- Petar Vutsov
- Svetoslav Vutsov
- Velislav Vutsov (born 1967), Bulgarian footballer and manager
