= Yordan Murlev =

Former Bulgarian professional footballer

Personal information
- Full name: Yordan Metodiev Murlev
- Date of birth: 3 May 1960 (age 66)
- Place of birth: Klyuch, Bulgaria
- Positions: Defender; defensive midfielder

Senior career*
Years	Team	Apps	(Gls)
1978–1980	Vihren Sandanski	62	(9)
1980–1987	Pirin Blagoevgrad	101	(11)
1987–1988	CSKA Sofia	17	(0)
1988	Levski Sofia	9	(0)
1989–1992	Yantra Gabrovo	80	(1)

International career
1981	Bulgaria	1	(0)
- * Club domestic league appearances and goals

Yordan Metodiev Murlev (Bulgarian: Йордан Методиев Мурлев; born 3 May 1960) is a Bulgarian former professional footballer who played as a defender or midfielder.

== Honours ==
=== Club ===
CSKA Sofia

- Bulgarian Cup: 1987–88
