= Iskren Pisarov =

Bulgarian footballer

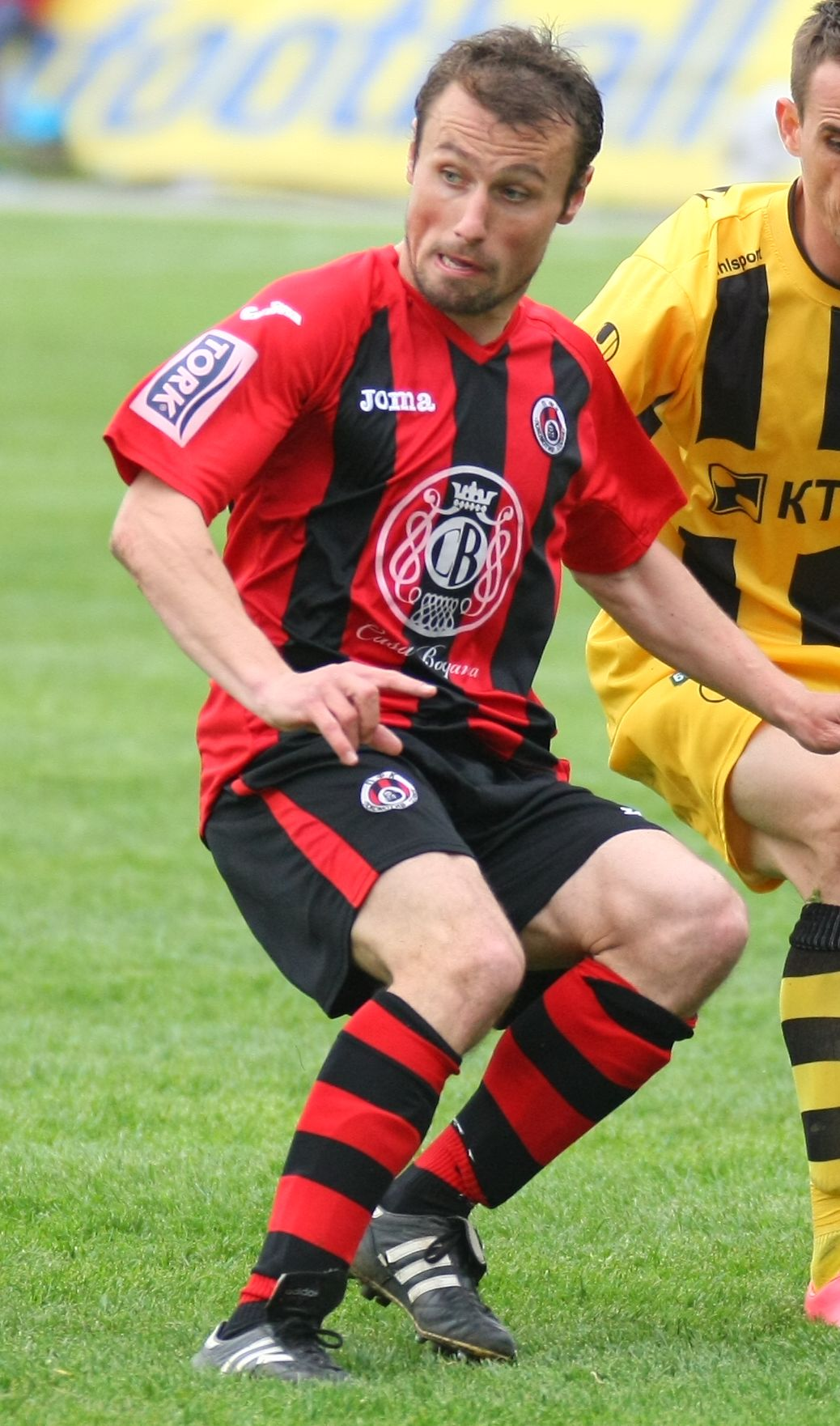

Personal information
- Full name: Iskren Nenchev Pisarov
- Date of birth: 5 October 1985 (age 41)
- Place of birth: Burgas, Bulgaria
- Height: 1.69 m (5 ft 7 in)
- Position: Winger

Team information
- Current team: Yantra Gabrovo
- Number: 11

Senior career*
Years	Team	Apps	(Gls)
2003–2006	Yantra Gabrovo		
2006–2008	Vidima-Rakovski	41	(6)
2008–2010	Lokomotiv Plovdiv	28	(1)
2009–2010	→ Beroe (loan)	25	(4)
2010–2011	Lokomotiv Sofia	38	(6)
2012	Beroe	9	(1)
2012	Minyor Pernik	9	(1)
2013–2014	Lokomotiv Sofia	32	(2)
2014	Chernomorets Burgas	11	(0)
2015	Etar	11	(6)
2015–2016	Sevlievo	26	(9)
2016–2018	Litex	37	(11)
2018–	Yantra Gabrovo	70	(14)
- * Club domestic league appearances and goals as of 5 June 2023

Iskren Nenchev Pisarov (Bulgarian: Искрен Ненчев Писаров; born 5 October 1985) is a Bulgarian footballer who plays as a winger for Yantra Gabrovo.

== Career ==
Pisarov played for Litex for two seasons but left the club by mutual consent in June 2018.

== Honours ==
Beroe Stara Zagora

- Bulgarian Cup: 2009-10
