= Veselin Ganev =

Bulgarian footballer

Personal information
- Full name: Veselin Vasilev Ganev
- Date of birth: 15 September 1987 (age 39)
- Place of birth: Blagoevgrad, Bulgaria
- Height: 1.86 m (6 ft 1 in)
- Position: Goalkeeper

Team information
- Current team: Septemvri Simitli
- Number: 74

Senior career*
Years	Team	Apps	(Gls)
2008–2011	Pirin Blagoevgrad	12	(0)
2008	→ Bansko (loan)	13	(0)
2011–2012	Septemvri Simitli	13	(0)
2012–2014	Bansko	31	(0)
2014–2017	Pirin Blagoevgrad	0	(0)
2017–2019	Arda Kardzhali	26	(0)
2019–2020	Pirin Blagoevgrad	6	(0)
2020–2021	Vihren Sandanski	?	(?)
2021–	Septemvri Simitli	0	(0)
- * Club domestic league appearances and goals as of 13 April 2022

Veselin Vasilev Ganev (Bulgarian: Веселин Василев Ганев; born 15 September 1987) is a Bulgarian footballer who plays as a goalkeeper for Septemvri Simitli.

== Career ==
After spending 3 years at Pirin Blagoevgrad as a second choice goalkeeper, Veselin signed with Arda Kardzhali on 2 July 2017.
