= Petar Hristov =

Bulgarian footballer

Personal information
- Full name: Petar Iliev Hristov
- Date of birth: 25 June 1999 (age 27)
- Place of birth: Blagoevgrad, Bulgaria
- Height: 1.84 m (6 ft 0 in)
- Position: Forward

Team information
- Current team: FC Krumovgrad
- Number: 9

Youth career
- Pirin Blagoevgrad

Senior career*
Years	Team	Apps	(Gls)
2017–2018	Pirin Blagoevgrad	17	(2)
2019–2021	Arda Kardzhali	7	(1)
2020–2021	→ Litex Lovech (loan)	23	(0)
2021–	FC Krumovgrad	25	(14)

International career
2017–2018	Bulgaria U19	2	(0)
- * Club domestic league appearances and goals as of 11:32, 3 June 2022 (UTC)

Petar Hristov (Bulgarian: Петър Христов; born 25 June 1999) is a Bulgarian footballer who currently plays as a forward for FC Krumovgrad.

On 9 September 2017, Hristov scored his first senior goal for Pirin in a 5–0 win against Lokomotiv Plovdiv. In July 2021, he joined Krumovgrad.
