= Atanas Stoimenov =

Bulgarian footballer

Personal information
- Full name: Atanas Yordanov Stoimenov
- Date of birth: 25 September 2002 (age 24)
- Place of birth: Pazardzhik, Bulgaria
- Height: 1.73 m (5 ft 8 in)
- Position: Midfielder

Team information
- Current team: Botev Plovdiv II
- Number: 17

Youth career
- 2010–2016: Maritsa Belovo
- 2016–2020: Botev Plovdiv

Senior career*
Years	Team	Apps	(Gls)
2019–	Botev Plovdiv	3	(0)
2020–2021	→ Yantra Gabrovo (loan)	21	(0)
2021–	→ Botev Plovdiv II	3	(0)
- * Club domestic league appearances and goals as of 19 August 2021

Atanas Stoimenov (Bulgarian: Атанас Стоименов; born 25 September 2002) is a Bulgarian footballer who plays as a midfielder for Botev Plovdiv II.

== Career statistics ==
=== Club ===
As of 27 July 2020

Club	League	Season	League		Cup		Continental		Total	
Club	League	Season	Apps	Goals	Apps	Goals	Apps	Goals	Apps	Goals
Botev Plovdiv	First League	2019–20	3	0	0	0	—		3	0
Career statistics			3	0	0	0	0	0	3	0
