= Emil Petrov (footballer, born 1996) =

Bulgarian footballer

Personal information
- Full name: Emil Dobrinov Petrov
- Date of birth: 19 June 1996 (age 30)
- Place of birth: Bulgaria
- Height: 1.80 m (5 ft 11 in)
- Positions: Right winger; right-back

Team information
- Current team: Septemvri Simitli
- Number: 20

Youth career
- –2013: Pirin 2001
- 2013–2015: Litex Lovech

Senior career*
| Years | Team | Apps | (Gls) |
| 2014–2016 | Litex Lovech | 1 | (0) |
| 2015 | Litex Lovech II | 13 | (2) |
| 2016 | → Lokomotiv Mezdra (loan) | 7 | (0) |
| 2016–2017 | CSKA Sofia II | 0 | (0) |
| 2016–2017 | → Spartak Pleven (loan) | 8 | (1) |
| 2017–2018 | Litex Lovech | 2 | (0) |
| 2018–2020 | Pirin Blagoevgrad | 28 | (0) |
| 2020– | Septemvri Simitli | 32 | (0) |

International career
| 2012–2013 | Bulgaria U17 | 5 | (0) |
- * Club domestic league appearances and goals as of 20 December 2021

Emil Dobrinov Petrov (Bulgarian: Емил Добринов Петров; born 19 June 1996) is a Bulgarian footballer who plays as a right winger and right-back for Septemvri Simitli.

== Career ==
On 14 June 2017, Petrov returned in his youth club Litex Lovech.

== Career statistics ==
As of 10 August 2015

| Club performance | | | League | | Cup | | Continental | | Other | | Total | |
| Club | League | Season | Apps | Goals | Apps | Goals | Apps | Goals | Apps | Goals | Apps | Goals |
| Bulgaria | | | League | | Bulgarian Cup | | Europe | | Other (Note: Includes Bulgarian Supercup matches.) | | Total | |
|---|---|---|---|---|---|---|---|---|---|---|---|---|
| Litex Lovech | A Group | 2014–15 | 1 | 0 | 0 | 0 | 0 | 0 | – | | 1 | 0 |
| Litex Lovech II | B Group | 2015–16 | 13 | 2 | – | | – | | – | | 13 | 2 |
| Litex Lovech | A Group | 2015–16 | 0 | 0 | 0 | 0 | 0 | 0 | – | | 0 | 0 |
| Litex Lovech | Total | | 1 | 0 | 0 | 0 | 0 | 0 | 0 | 0 | 1 | 0 |
| Career statistics | | | 14 | 2 | 0 | 0 | 0 | 0 | 0 | 0 | 14 | 2 |
