= Dimitar Blagov =

Bulgarian footballer

Personal information
- Full name: Dimitar Ivaylov Blagov
- Date of birth: 30 March 1992 (age 34)
- Place of birth: Blagoevgrad, Bulgaria
- Height: 1.79 m (5 ft 10 in)
- Position: Midfielder

Team information
- Current team: Septemvri Simitli
- Number: 99

Youth career
- 2003–2009: Pirin 2001
- 2010–2011: Chernomorets Burgas

Senior career*
Years	Team	Apps	(Gls)
2011–2012	Chernomorets Pomorie	30	(0)
2012	Neftochimic 1986	10	(0)
2013–2020	Pirin Blagoevgrad	168	(27)
2020	Strumska Slava	3	(0)
2020–2021	Vihren Sandanski	4	(0)
2021–2022	FC Kyustendil	16	(0)
2022–	Septemvri Simitli	2	(0)
- * Club domestic league appearances and goals as of 13 April 2022

Dimitar Ivaylov Blagov (Bulgarian: Димитър Ивайлов Благов; born 30 March 1992) is a Bulgarian footballer currently playing as a midfielder for Septemvri Simitli.

== Career ==
Blagov joined Pirin Blagoevgrad in January 2013.
