= Filip Dimitrov (footballer) =

Bulgarian footballer

Personal information
- Full name: Filip Ivanov Dimitrov
- Date of birth: 13 April 1995 (age 31)
- Place of birth: Blagoevgrad, Bulgaria
- Height: 1.83 m (6 ft 0 in)
- Position: Goalkeeper

Team information
- Current team: Septemvri Simitli
- Number: 13

Youth career
- 2003–2012: Pirin Blagoevgrad
- 2013: Botev Plovdiv

Senior career*
Years	Team	Apps	(Gls)
2013–2015	Botev Plovdiv	0	(0)
2013	→ Rakovski (loan)	5	(0)
2014	→ Spartak Varna (loan)	6	(0)
2015–2016	Septemvri Simitli	21	(0)
2016	Oborishte	11	(0)
2017–2018	Tsarsko Selo	36	(0)
2018–2019	Dunav Ruse	8	(0)
2019	→ Pirin Blagoevgrad (loan)	12	(0)
2019–2020	Septemvri Sofia	4	(0)
2020	Montana	0	(0)
2020–	Septemvri Simitli	28	(0)
- * Club domestic league appearances and goals as of 00:45, 22 December 2021 (UTC)

Filip Ivanov Dimitrov (Bulgarian: Филип Иванов Димитров; born 13 April 1995) is a Bulgarian footballer who plays as a goalkeeper for Septemvri Simitli.
