= Ivan Mitrev =

Bulgarian footballer

Personal information
- Full name: Ivan Bozhkov Mitrev
- Date of birth: 28 May 1999 (age 27)
- Place of birth: Sandanski, Bulgaria
- Height: 1.80 m (5 ft 11 in)
- Positions: Winger; forward

Youth career
- Vihren Sandanski
- –2016: Litex Lovech
- 2016–2020: CSKA Sofia

Senior career*
Years	Team	Apps	(Gls)
2016–2017	CSKA Sofia II	5	(1)
2017–2023	CSKA Sofia	1	(0)
2018–2021	→ Litex Lovech (loan)	66	(15)
2021–2022	→ Botev Vratsa (loan)	6	(0)
2022	→ Litex Lovech (loan)	3	(0)
Total		81	(16)

International career
2015–2016	Bulgaria U17	4	(0)
- * Club domestic league appearances and goals as of 22 September 2022

Ivan Mitrev (Bulgarian: Иван Митрев; born 28 May 1999) is a Bulgarian retired professional footballer who played as a winger or forward.

== History ==
Mitrev started his career at CSKA Sofia Academy. On 9 March 2022, while playing on loan to Litex Lovech, Mitrev's leg was broken by Nikola Borisov which ruled him out until end of the season. Mitrev never returned to the play until July 2023, when he announced his retirement, due to the injury he received. He later announced that he become a real estate broker.

== Career statistics ==
=== Club ===
As of 9 March 2022

Club performance			League		Cup		Continental		Other		Total	
Club	League	Season	Apps	Goals	Apps	Goals	Apps	Goals	Apps	Goals	Apps	Goals
Bulgaria			League		Bulgarian Cup		Europe		Other (Note: Includes Bulgarian Supercup matches.)		Total	
CSKA Sofia II	Second League	2016–17	5	1	—		—		—		5	1
CSKA Sofia	First League	2017–18	1	0	0	0	—		—		1	0
Litex Lovech	Second League	2018–19	26	8	1	0	—		—		27	8
Litex Lovech	Second League	2019–20	17	4	2	1	—		—		19	5
Litex Lovech	Second League	2020–21	22	3	0	0	—		—		22	3
Litex Lovech	Total		65	15	3	1	0	0	0	0	66	16
Botev Vratsa	First League	2021–22	6	0	0	0	—		—		6	0
Litex Lovech	Second League	2021–22	3	0	0	0	—		—		3	0
Career statistics			80	16	3	1	0	0	0	0	82	17
