= FC Septemvri Simitli =

Bulgarian football club

Septemvri
- Full name: Football Club Septemvri Simitli
- Nickname: The Simitlians
- Founded: 1942; 84 years ago
- Ground: Struma, Simitli
- Capacity: 8,000
- Chairman: Hristo Atanasovski
- Manager: Spas Stoimenov
- League: Third League
- 2021–22: Second League, relegated
Home colours	Away colours

FC Septemvri (Bulgarian: ФК Септември) is a Bulgarian football club based in Simitli, which currently plays in the Third League, the third tier of the Bulgarian football league system.

== History ==
The club was founded in 1942. From 1961 to 1975, it was called "Pirin miner". The players at that time were mostly young boys from the age of 18 to 20, with the exception of goalkeeper Dimitar Atanasovski (former player from Belasitsa). The recruited coach was Stoimenov and assistant coach was Radoslav Mitrevski (former player of CSKA Sofia and OFC Pirin Blagoevgrad).

As of 2011, Septemvri is officially affiliated as a satellite to Levski Sofia. On 15 March 2012, the team reached the 1/2 finals of the Bulgarian Cup for the first time in its history, eliminating Bulgarian powerhouse CSKA Sofia in the quarter-finals by a score of 2:1. They lost in the next round against Ludogorets by a score of 1:4.

== Honours ==
- Sixth place in the Western "B" group: 2010/11 and 2011 /12
- Semifinalist in the National Cup tournament: this time its official name is the Cup of Bulgaria - 2011 /12
- Cup of Amateur Football League: 1994/95

== Current squad ==
As of 13 April 2022

Note: Flags indicate national team as defined under FIFA eligibility rules; some limited exceptions apply. Players may hold more than one non-FIFA nationality.

No.	Pos.	Nation	Player
4	DF	BUL	Dimitar Mitev
5	DF	BUL	Lyubomir Graminov
6	MF	BUL	Yoan Petrov
8	MF	BUL	Todor Trayanov
9	FW	BUL	Vladislav Zlatinov
10	FW	BUL	Anatoli Luleyski (captain)
11	MF	FRA	Jean-Pierre Da Silva
13	GK	BUL	Filip Dimitrov
19	FW	FRA	Nelson Galvanelli
20	DF	BUL	Emil Petrov

No.	Pos.	Nation	Player
21	DF	BUL	Filip Angelov
24	GK	CRO	Antonio Tuta
28	DF	BUL	Krum Nikolov
69	FW	FRA	Nadzhib Chibout
74	GK	BUL	Veselin Ganev
77	DF	BUL	Kristiyan Mihaylov
88	DF	BUL	Ivaylo Ivanov
99	MF	BUL	Dimitar Blagov
—	MF	BUL	Kiril Mutavdzhiyski

For recent transfers, see Transfers summer 2020.

== Past seasons ==
Season	League	Place	W	D	L	GF	GA	Pts	Bulgarian Cup
2010–11	B PFG (II)	6	12	7	11	30	31	43	First round
2011–12	B PFG	6	8	10	9	48	35	33	Semifinals
2012–13	B PFG	13	4	3	19	18	39	15	First round
2013–14	V AFG (III)	2	21	7	2	47	15	70	not qualified
2014–15	B PFG	12	11	3	16	30	47	36	First round
2015–16	B PFG	15	6	5	19	26	50	23	First round
2016–17	Third League (III)	2	21	9	4	62	28	72	not qualified
2017–18	Third League	7	14	8	12	46	37	50	not qualified
Green marks a season followed by promotion, red a season followed by relegation.
