= Simeon Mechev =

Bulgarian footballer

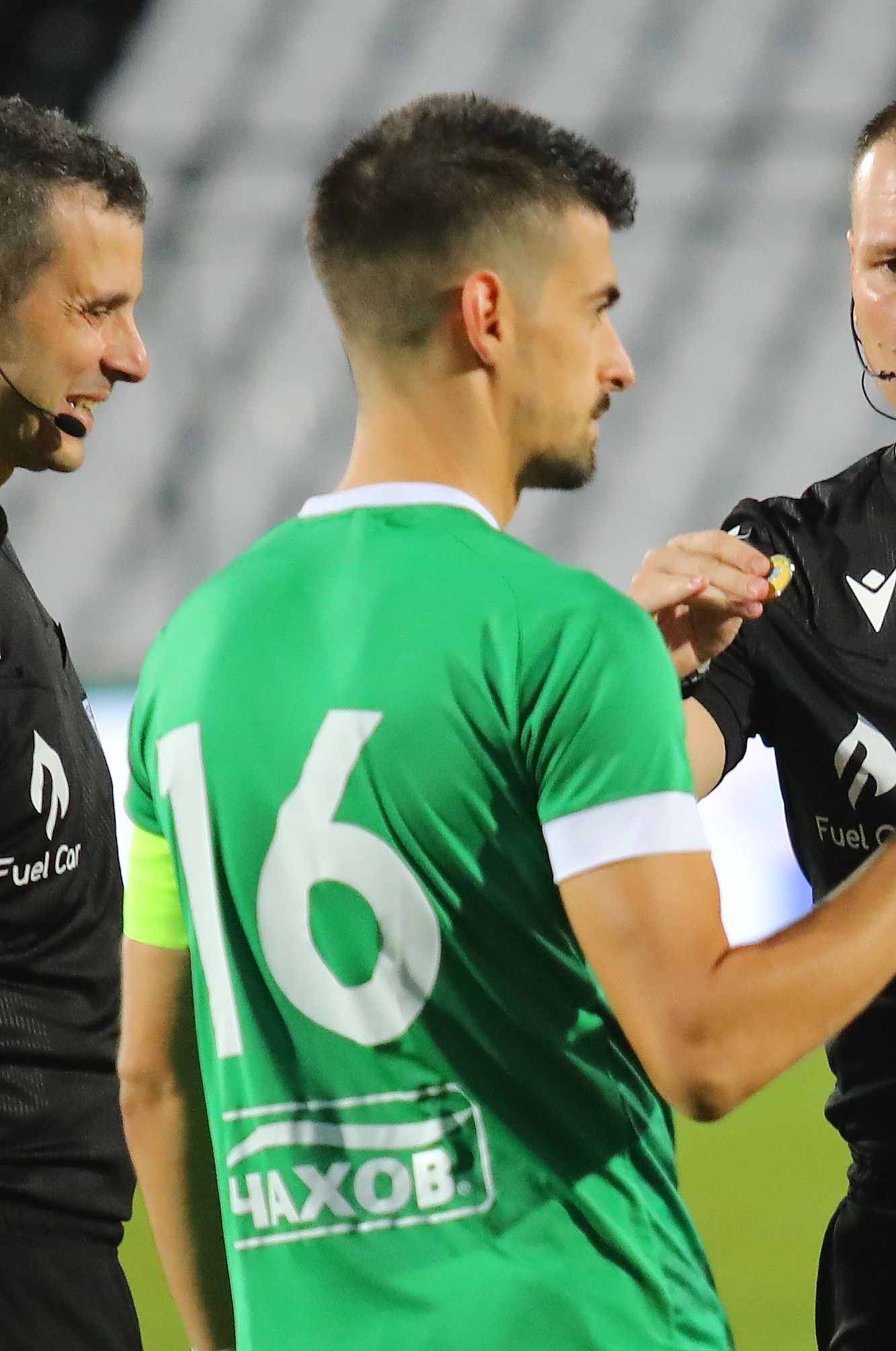

Personal information
- Full name: Simeon Krasimirov Mechev
- Date of birth: 16 March 1990 (age 36)
- Place of birth: Stara Zagora, Bulgaria
- Height: 1.75 m (5 ft 9 in)
- Position: Midfielder

Team information
- Current team: Marek
- Number: 16

Youth career
- Trayana
- Beroe
- 2008–2009: Slavia Sofia

Senior career*
Years	Team	Apps	(Gls)
2009–2011	Slavia Sofia	3	(0)
2010	→ Montana (loan)	3	(0)
2011	→ Beroe (loan)	10	(1)
2011	Botev Vratsa	13	(0)
2012	Vidima-Rakovski	10	(1)
2013	Vereya	15	(4)
2013	Botev Vratsa	9	(0)
2014	Neftochimic 1986	11	(0)
2014–2015	PFC Burgas	18	(2)
2015	Neftochimic	15	(1)
2016–2017	Lokomotiv GO	31	(1)
2018	Vereya	21	(0)
2019	Botev Vratsa	23	(1)
2020	Tsarsko Selo	11	(1)
2020	Septemvri Sofia	5	(1)
2021	Etar	16	(0)
2021–2023	Beroe	62	(4)
2023–2024	Lokomotiv Sofia	24	(3)
2024–2025	Dobrudzha	1	(0)
2025	Yambol	16	(3)
2025	Rilski Sportist	4	(1)
2025–	Marek	22	(2)
- * Club domestic league appearances and goals as of 11 June 2026

Simeon Mechev (Bulgarian: Симеон Мечев; born 16 March 1990) is a Bulgarian professional footballer who plays as a midfielder for Marek Dupnitsa.

== Family ==
His mother Malina is a Bulgarian pop folk singer and football agent; his father Krasimir Mechev is a Bulgarian retired footballer.

== Career ==
=== Youth Clubs ===
Born in Stara Zagora Mechev played for two youth clubs in his home town, ranging from 1997 to 2007, including Trayana and Beroe. In January 2008 he moved to Slavia Sofia and signed his first professional contract.

Mechev spent two seasons at Lokomotiv Gorna Oryahovitsa but was released in September 2017.

=== Later career ===
He rejoined Beroe in 2021, where he subsequently became the team captain, but parted ways with the team in August 2023, shortly after the start of the new season.
