= Iliya Dimitrov =

Bulgarian footballer

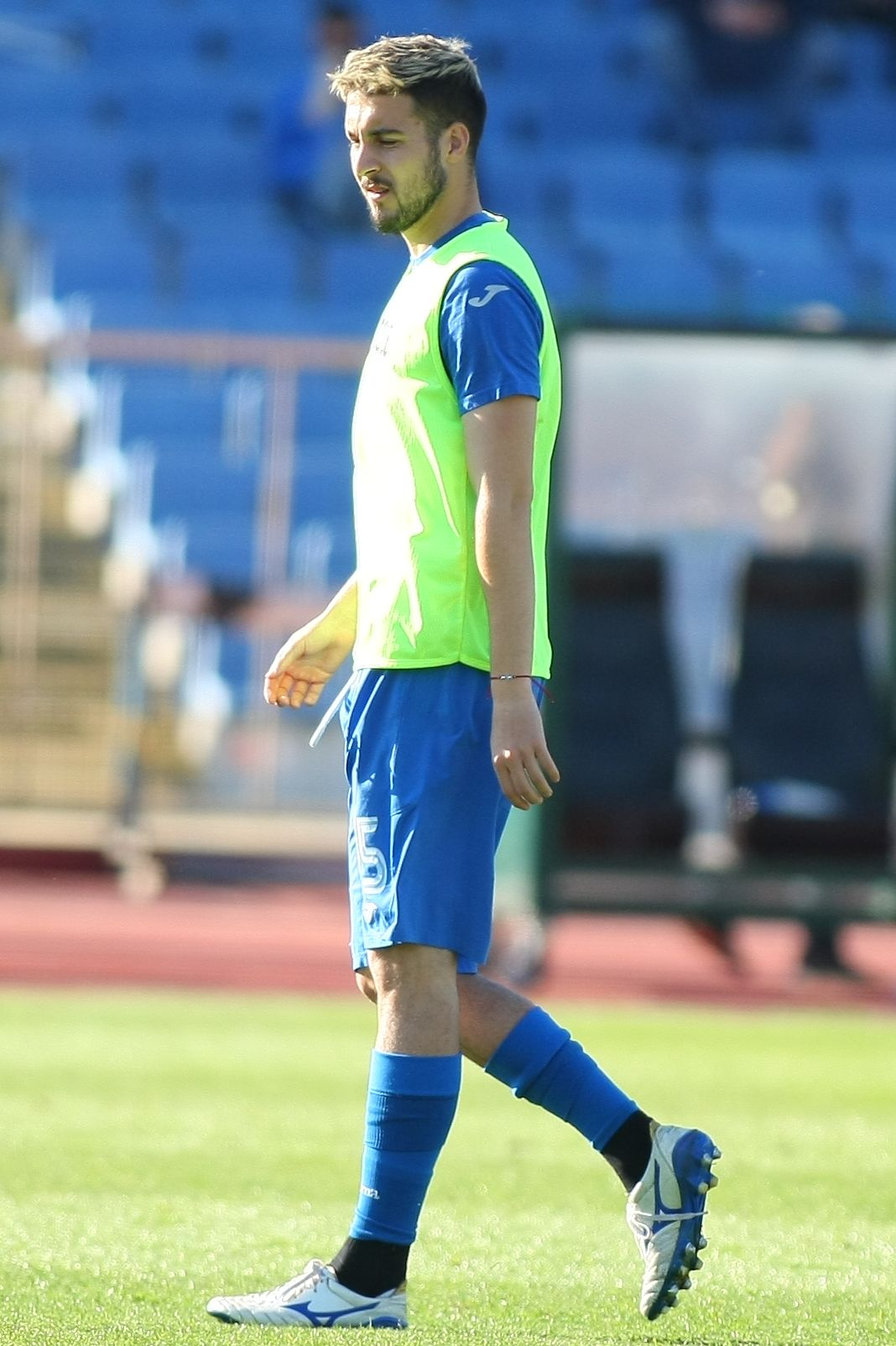

Personal information
- Full name: Iliya Asenov Dimitrov
- Date of birth: 10 July 1996 (age 30)
- Place of birth: Dupnitsa, Bulgaria
- Height: 1.82 m (5 ft 11 1/2 in)
- Position: Forward

Team information
- Current team: Rilski Sportist
- Number: 9

Youth career
- –2014: Levski Sofia

Senior career*
Years	Team	Apps	(Gls)
2013–2021	Levski Sofia	19	(1)
2016	→ Neftochimic (loan)	13	(2)
2016	→ Pirin Blagoevgrad (loan)	3	(0)
2017–2018	→ Lokomotiv Sofia (loan)	41	(21)
2019	→ Septemvri Sofia (loan)	10	(3)
2019–2020	→ Vitosha Bistritsa (loan)	15	(3)
2021–2023	Lokomotiv Sofia	38	(5)
2023–2024	Oțelul Galați	3	(0)
2024	Unirea Slobozia	4	(0)
2024	Marek Dupnitsa	18	(11)
2025	Tabor Sežana	8	(4)
2025–2026	Marek Dupnitsa	24	(4)
2026–	Rilski Sportist	14	(3)

International career
2012–2013	Bulgaria U17	4	(0)
2014	Bulgaria U19	1	(0)
2016–2017	Bulgaria U21	6	(0)
- * Club domestic league appearances and goals as of 2 November 2026

Iliya Asenov Dimitrov (Bulgarian: Илия Асенов Димитров; born 10 July 1996) is a Bulgarian professional footballer who plays as a centre-forward for Bulgarian Second League club Rilski Sportist Samokov.

== Career ==
Dimitrov made his first team debut in a 4–1 league win over Pirin Gotse Delchev on 3 November 2013, coming on as a substitute for Antonio Vutov.

In January 2017, Dimitrov was loaned to Second League club Lokomotiv Sofia until the end of the season.

Dimitrov returned to Levski Sofia for the 2018–19 season. On 26 February 2019 he signed a new 3-year contract with Levski. 2 days later he was loaned to Septemvri Sofia until the end of the season. He made his debut for the team on 2 March in a league match against CSKA Sofia and scored a goal in the 89th minute for the 5:1 loss.

== Honours ==
Levski Sofia

- Bulgarian Cup runner-up: 2014–15

Unirea Slobozia

- Liga II: 2023–24
