= Paco Puertas =

Spanish footballer

Personal information
- Full name: Francisco Puertas Trujillano
- Date of birth: 7 November 1995 (age 31)
- Place of birth: Madrid, Spain
- Height: 1.84 m (6 ft 0 in)
- Position: Defender

Team information
- Current team: Villaverde San Andrés

Youth career
- 2011–2013: Unión Adarve
- 2013–2014: Rayo Majadahonda

Senior career*
| Years | Team | Apps | (Gls) |
| 2014–2015 | Torrejón | 1 | (0) |
| 2015 | Villaviciosa | 10 | (0) |
| 2015–2016 | Puerta Bonita | 26 | (3) |
| 2016 | San Fernando | 1 | (0) |
| 2017–2018 | Rayo Vallecano B | 3 | (0) |
| 2017 | → Villaverde (loan) | 5 | (0) |
| 2018–2019 | Mérida | 8 | (0) |
| 2019 | → Villaverde (loan) | 8 | (0) |
| 2019 | SS Reyes | 0 | (0) |
| 2019–2020 | Burgos Promesas | 10 | (2) |
| 2020–2022 | Fuenlabrada | 0 | (0) |
| 2020–2021 | → Etar (loan) | 3 | (0) |
| 2021–2022 | → Burgos B (loan) | 9 | (0) |
| 2022–2023 | Olympiakos Nicosia | 0 | (0) |
| 2023 | Izarra | 2 | (0) |
| 2023 | Paracuellos MX | 0 | (0) |
| 2024 | Villanueva Pardillo | 10 | (0) |
| 2024– | Villaverde San Andrés | 3 | (0) |
- * Club domestic league appearances and goals as of 13 October 2024

Francisco "Paco" Puertas Trujillano (born 7 November 1995) is a Spanish professional footballer who played as either a central defender or a left back for Villaverde San Andrés.

== Club career ==
Puertas was born in Madrid, and represented AD Unión Adarve and CF Rayo Majadahonda as a youth. In 2014, after finishing his formation, he signed for Tercera División side AD Torrejón CF, but left the club in January of the following year after appearing rarely, and subsequently moved to AD Villaviciosa de Odón in the regional leagues.

In July 2015, Puertas joined CD Puerta Bonita in the fourth tier, where he featured regularly. During the 2016–17 season, he agreed to a deal with Rayo Vallecano after a short spell with CD San Fernando de Henares; initially assigned to the reserves, he was subsequently loaned to Villaverde San Andrés.

Back to Rayo and their B-team in July 2017, Puertas spent most of the campaign sidelined due to knee injuries. On 26 June 2018, he signed for Mérida AD, still in the fourth division, but again featured rarely before returning to Villaverde the following 26 January, also on loan.

On 14 July 2019, Puertas agreed to a contract with UD San Sebastián de los Reyes in Segunda División B, but moved to CD Burgos Promesas 2000 in division four on 22 August, without making a single appearance for his previous club. On 12 September 2020, he signed a two-year deal with CF Fuenlabrada in Segunda División, after spending the pre-season on trial at the club, and was immediately loaned to Bulgarian First Professional League side SFC Etar Veliko Tarnovo.

Officially presented at Etar on 24 September 2020, Puertas made his professional debut on the following day, starting in a 1–5 away loss against CSKA 1948. On 13 August of the following year, he returned to Burgos Promesas on loan, with the club now being a reserve team of Burgos CF.
