= Stoyan Ivanov (footballer) =

Bulgarian footballer

Personal information
- Full name: Stoyan Georgiev Ivanov
- Date of birth: 14 May 2001 (age 25)
- Place of birth: Stara Zagora, Bulgaria
- Height: 1.75 m (5 ft 9 in)
- Position: Midfielder

Team information
- Current team: Beroe

Youth career
- 2010–2018: Beroe Stara Zagora

Senior career*
Years	Team	Apps	(Gls)
2018–	Beroe Stara Zagora	6	(0)
2019	→ Spartak Varna (loan)	12	(0)
2020–2021	→ Yantra Gabrovo (loan)	25	(0)

International career
2019–	Bulgaria U18	2	(0)
- * Club domestic league appearances and goals as of 25 October 2021

Stoyan Ivanov (Bulgarian: Стоян Иванов; born 14 May 2001) is a Bulgarian footballer who plays as a midfielder for Bulgarian First League club Beroe Stara Zagora.

== Career ==
On 21 February 2019, he made his professional debut in Beroe's 1–0 victory over Etar, replacing Ivan Minchev in the stoppage time. On 29 May 2019, Ivanov signed his first professional contract with the club.

== Career statistics ==
=== Club ===
As of 27 May 2019

Club	League	Season	League		Cup		Continental		Total	
Club	League	Season	Apps	Goals	Apps	Goals	Apps	Goals	Apps	Goals
Beroe	First League	2018–19	6	0	0	0	—		6	0
Career statistics			6	0	0	0	0	0	6	0
