= Georgi Mariyanov =

Bulgarian footballer

Personal information
- Full name: Georgi Mariyanov Ivanov
- Date of birth: 25 July 1993 (age 33)
- Place of birth: Sofia, Bulgaria
- Height: 1.87 m (6 ft 2 in)
- Position: Central midfielder

Team information
- Current team: Spartak Varna
- Number: 27

Senior career*
Years	Team	Apps	(Gls)
2012–2013	Botev Ihtiman	26	(1)
2013–2018	Strumska Slava	131	(7)
2018–2020	Litex Lovech	46	(4)
2020–2023	CSKA 1948	3	(0)
2020–2021	→ Strumska Slava (loan)	25	(3)
2021–2023	→ CSKA 1948 II	57	(2)
2023–	Spartak Varna	20	(1)
- * Club domestic league appearances and goals as of 28 December 2023

Georgi Mariyanov (Bulgarian: Георги Мариянов; born 25 July 1993) is a Bulgarian professional footballer who plays as a midfielder for Spartak Varna. In June 2023, he joined Spartak Varna.
