= Toni Ivanov =

Bulgarian footballer

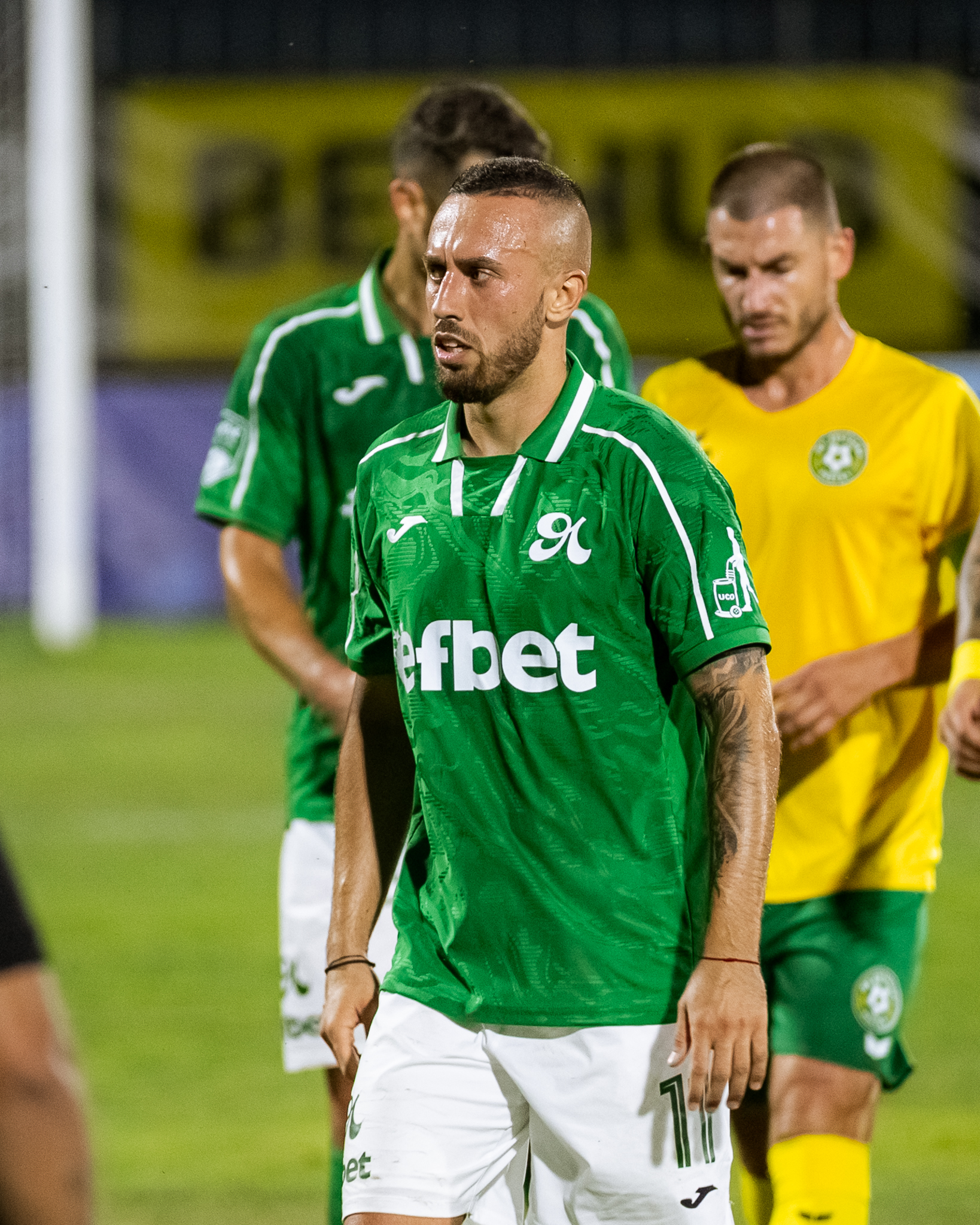

Personal information
- Full name: Toni Ivanov Ivanov
- Date of birth: 21 March 1999 (age 27)
- Place of birth: Gabrovo, Bulgaria
- Height: 1.66 m (5 ft 5 in)
- Position: Midfielder

Team information
- Current team: Yantra Gabrovo
- Number: 71

Youth career
- Yantra Gabrovo
- –2016: Litex Lovech
- 2016–2017: Ludogorets

Senior career*
Years	Team	Apps	(Gls)
2017	Ludogorets II	8	(0)
2018–2022	Slavia Sofia	4	(1)
2019	→ Lokomotiv GO (loan)	13	(3)
2019	→ CSKA 1948 (loan)	15	(2)
2020	→ Etar (loan)	3	(0)
2020–2022	→ Yantra Gabrovo (loan)	51	(4)
2022	Montana	17	(0)
2023–	Yantra Gabrovo	98	(6)

International career^{‡}
2015–2016	Bulgaria U17	4	(0)
2017–2018	Bulgaria U19	10	(2)
- * Club domestic league appearances and goals as of 26 May 2026 ‡ National team caps and goals as of 19 February 2018

Toni Ivanov Ivanov (Bulgarian: Тони Иванов Иванов; born 21 March 1999) is a Bulgarian professional footballer who plays as a midfielder for Bulgarian Second League club Yantra Gabrovo.

== Career ==
=== Slavia Sofia ===
Ivanov moved to Slavia Sofia on 8 January 2018 coming from Ludogorets Razgrad Academy. He made his professional debut for the team on 18 February 2018 in the first league match for the year, against his youth club Ludogorets Razgrad. On 29 April 2018, he scored his first goal in a league match against Pirin Blagoevgrad.

== Career statistics ==
=== Club ===
As of 13 May 2018

Club performance			League		Cup		Continental		Other		Total	
Club	League	Season	Apps	Goals	Apps	Goals	Apps	Goals	Apps	Goals	Apps	Goals
Bulgaria			League		Bulgarian Cup		Europe		Other (Note: Includes Bulgarian Supercup matches.)		Total	
Ludogorets II	Second League	2016–17	1	0	–		–		–		1	0
Ludogorets II	Second League	2017–18	7	0	–		–		–		7	0
Ludogorets II	Total		8	0	0	0	0	0	0	0	8	0
Slavia Sofia	First League	2017–18	3	1	0	0	–		–		3	1
Slavia Sofia	Total		3	1	0	0	0	0	0	0	3	1
Career statistics			11	1	0	0	0	0	0	0	11	1

== Honours ==
Slavia Sofia

- Bulgarian Cup (1): 2017–18
