= Atanas Tasholov =

Bulgarian footballer

Personal information
- Full name: Atanas Ivanov Tasholov
- Date of birth: 9 September 1998 (age 28)
- Place of birth: Plovdiv, Bulgaria
- Position: Centre back

Team information
- Current team: Gigant Saedinenie
- Number: 4

Youth career
- Botev Plovdiv

Senior career*
Years	Team	Apps	(Gls)
2016–2019	Botev Plovdiv	1	(0)
2017–2018	→ Maritsa Plovdiv (loan)	26	(1)
2018	→ Nesebar (loan)	17	(1)
2019–2020	Neftochimic	16	(2)
2020	Lokomotiv GO	6	(0)
2021	Hebar	5	(0)
2021	Sozopol	19	(0)
2022–2023	Krumovgrad	41	(2)
2023–2025	Maritsa Plovdiv	67	(3)
2025–	Gigant Saedinenie	18	(1)

International career
2017	Bulgaria U19	1	(0)
- * Club domestic league appearances and goals as of 5 January 2026

Atanas Tasholov (Bulgarian: Атанас Ташолов; born 9 September 1998) is a Bulgarian footballer who currently plays as a defender for Gigant Saedinenie.

== Career ==
On 9 December 2016, Tasholov made his professional debut for Botev Plovdiv in a 0–4 away defeat by Neftochimic, coming on as substitute for Yaya Meledje. On 16 June 2017, he signed his first professional contract and was sent on loan to Maritsa Plovdiv. In June 2018, he was loaned to Nesebar. In February 2022, Tasholov joined Krumovgrad. In June 2023, he signed a contract with Maritsa Plovdiv.
