= Emanuil Manev =

Bulgarian footballer

Personal information
- Full name: Emanuil Ganchev Manev
- Date of birth: 19 April 1992 (age 34)
- Place of birth: Karnobat, Bulgaria
- Height: 1.86 m (6 ft 1 in)
- Position: Midfielder

Team information
- Current team: Chernomorets Burgas
- Number: 14

Senior career*
Years	Team	Apps	(Gls)
2009–2011	Chernomorets Pomorie	37	(2)
2012–2014	Neftochimic 1986	70	(10)
2014	Ústí nad Labem	5	(1)
2015	Burgas	13	(1)
2015–2016	Sozopol	29	(8)
2016–2017	Neftochimic	22	(3)
2017–2018	Nesebar	28	(5)
2018–2019	Tsarsko Selo	37	(6)
2020	Neftochimic	3	(0)
2020–2021	Tsarsko Selo	29	(4)
2021–2022	Hebar	43	(12)
2023	Sozopol	16	(4)
2023–2024	Dobrudzha	20	(2)
2024–	Chernomorets Burgas	20	(1)

International career
2009–2010	Bulgaria U19	5	(0)
2012–2013	Bulgaria U21	2	(0)
- * Club domestic league appearances and goals as of 30 December 2025

Emanuil Ganchev Manev (Bulgarian: Емануил Манев; born 19 April 1992) is a Bulgarian professional footballer who plays as a midfielder for Chernomorets Burgas. He has represented Bulgaria at U-19 and U-21 level.

== Career ==
On 25 June 2017, Manev signed with Nesebar.

On 17 June 2018, he joined Tsarsko Selo.

== Club statistics ==
As of 8 August 2014

Club	Season	Division	League		Cup		Europe		Total	
Club	Season	Division	Apps	Goals	Apps	Goals	Apps	Goals	Apps	Goals
Chernomorets Pomorie	2009–10	B Group	13	0	4	0	–		17	0
Chernomorets Pomorie	2010–11	B Group	14	1	3	0	–		17	1
Chernomorets Pomorie	2011–12	B Group	10	1	1	0	–		11	1
Neftochimic Burgas	2011–12	B Group	11	1	0	0	–		11	1
Neftochimic Burgas	2012–13	B Group	25	9	4	0	–		29	9
Neftochimic Burgas	2013–14	A Group	34	0	2	0	–		36	0
Ústí nad Labem	2014–15	Czech 2. Liga	2	1	0	0	–		2	1
Total	Bulgaria		108	11	14	0	0	0	122	11
