= Petar Vutsov =

Bulgarian footballer

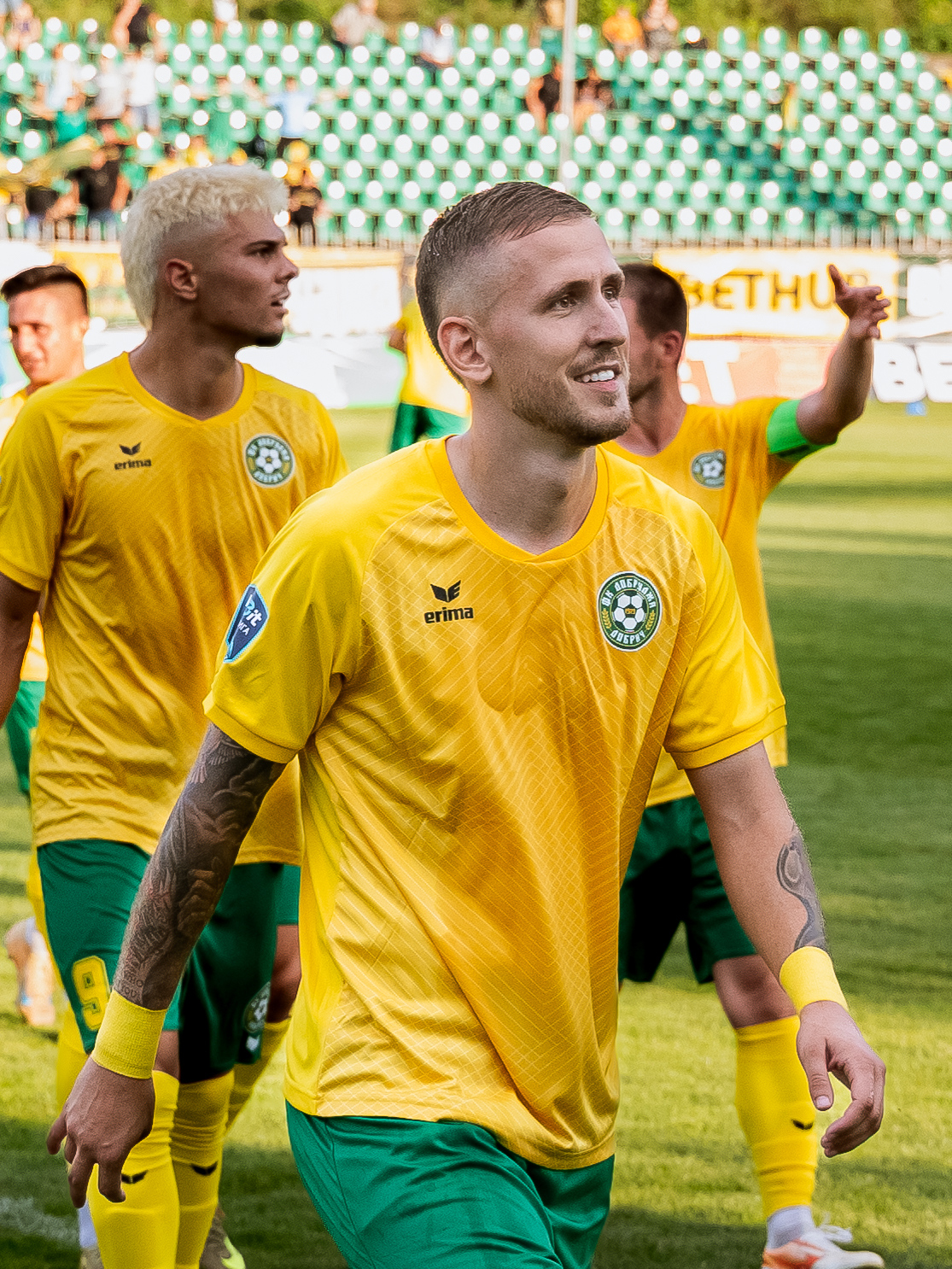

Personal information
- Full name: Petar Velislavov Vutsov
- Date of birth: 7 August 2000 (age 26)
- Place of birth: Varna, Bulgaria
- Height: 1.91 m (6 ft 3 in)
- Position: Defensive midfielder

Team information
- Current team: Dobrudzha
- Number: 77

Youth career
- 2008–2019: Cherno More

Senior career*
Years	Team	Apps	(Gls)
2019–2021	Cherno More	5	(0)
2019	→ Spartak Pleven (loan)	2	(0)
2020	→ Pirin Blagoevgrad (loan)	2	(0)
2021	Slavia Sofia	1	(0)
2021–2022	Botev Plovdiv II	22	(0)
2022	Sozopol	8	(1)
2023	Sportist Svoge	13	(1)
2023–2024	Yantra Gabrovo	33	(0)
2024–2026	Minyor Pernik	59	(1)
2026–	Dobrudzha	11	(0)
- * Club domestic league appearances and goals as of 22 September 2026 (UTC)

Petar Vutsov (Bulgarian: Петър Вуцов; born 7 August 2000) is a Bulgarian professional footballer who plays as a midfielder for Second League club Dobrudzha Dobrich.

He comes from a footballing family, with his grandfather Ivan, father Velislav, mother Svetlana and brother Svetoslav having all played professional football.

== Career ==
Vutsov made his first team debut for Cherno More in a 3–2 away loss against Slavia Sofia on 19 February 2019, coming on as a substitute for Patrick Andrade.
