= Dimitar Savov =

Bulgarian footballer

Personal information
- Full name: Dimitar Valeriev Savov
- Date of birth: 29 January 1998 (age 28)
- Place of birth: Sofia, Bulgaria
- Height: 1.76 m (5 ft 9 in)
- Position: Right-back

Team information
- Current team: Minyor Pernik
- Number: 14

Youth career
- Slavia Sofia

Senior career*
Years	Team	Apps	(Gls)
2016–2017	Slivnishki Geroy	?	(?)
2017–2020	Minyor Pernik	83	(2)
2020–2021	CSKA 1948	5	(0)
2021–	Minyor Pernik	26	(0)

International career
2015	Bulgaria U17	3	(0)
- * Club domestic league appearances and goals as of 5 June 2023

Dimitar Savov (Bulgarian: Димитър Савов; born 29 January 1998) is a Bulgarian professional footballer who plays as a defender for Minyor Pernik.
