= Vanyo Ivanov =

Bulgarian footballer

Personal information
- Full name: Vanyo Iliev Ivanov
- Date of birth: 9 May 2000 (age 26)
- Place of birth: Berkovitsa, Bulgaria
- Height: 1.85 m (6 ft 1 in)
- Position: Right back

Team information
- Current team: Lokomotiv Mezdra
- Number: 94

Youth career
- –2019: Montana

Senior career*
Years	Team	Apps	(Gls)
2019	Vitosha Bistritsa	8	(0)
2020	Montana	1	(0)
2020–	Sportist Svoge	15	(0)
- * Club domestic league appearances and goals as of 19:29, 30 April 2021 (UTC)

Vanyo Ivanov (Bulgarian: Ваньо Иванов; born 9 May 2000) is a Bulgarian footballer who plays as a defender for Sportist Svoge.
