= Hristiyan Vasilev =

Bulgarian footballer

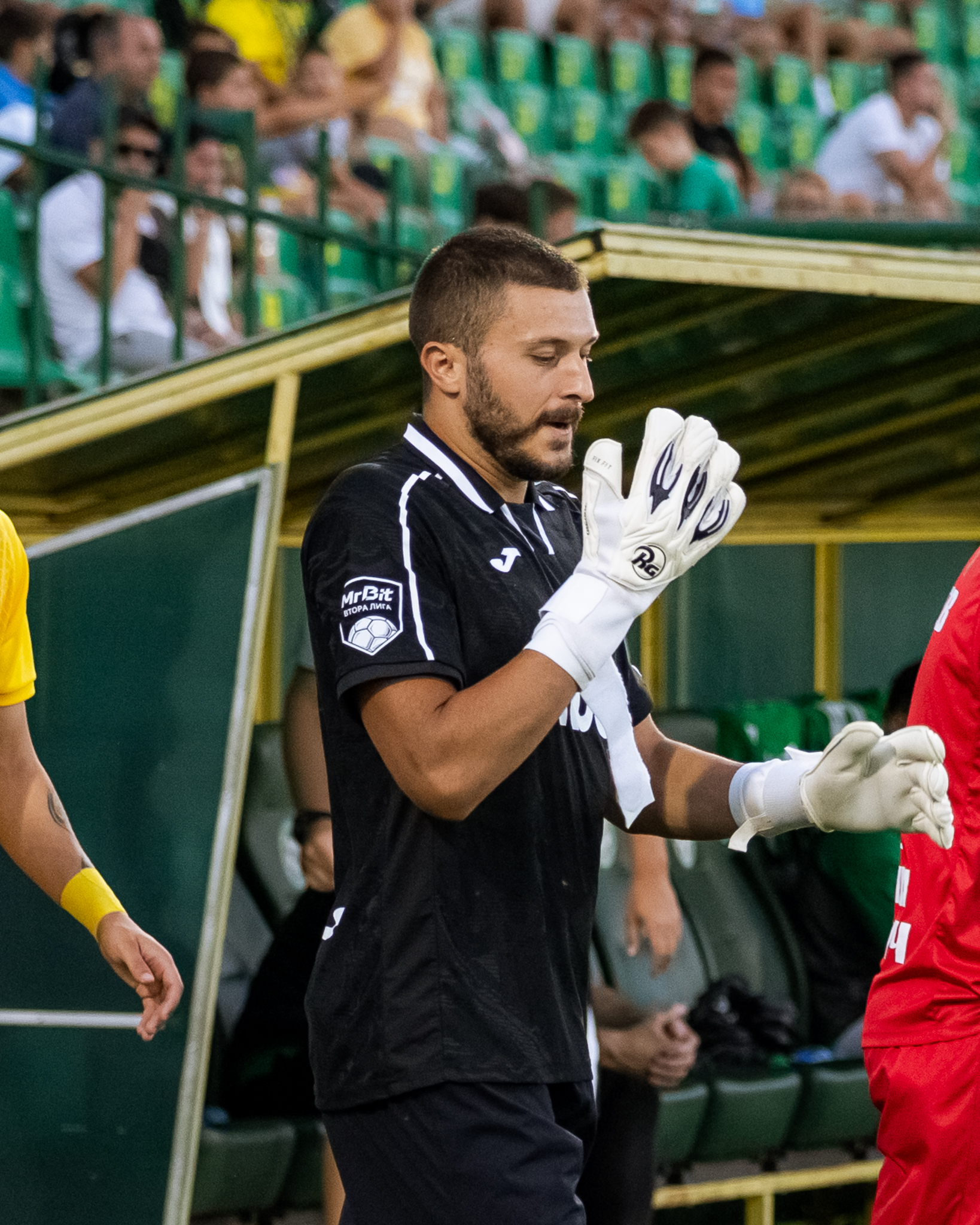

Personal information
- Full name: Hristiyan Iliyanov Vasilev
- Date of birth: 5 December 1997 (age 28)
- Place of birth: Gabrovo, Bulgaria
- Height: 1.88 m (6 ft 2 in)
- Position: Goalkeeper

Team information
- Current team: Yantra Gabrovo
- Number: 1

Youth career
- Yantra Gabrovo
- Vidima-Rakovski
- Slavia Sofia

Senior career*
Years	Team	Apps	(Gls)
2015–2016	Slavia Sofia	0	(0)
2016	→ Yantra Gabrovo (loan)	16	(0)
2016–2020	Vitosha Bistritsa	75	(0)
2020–2021	Beroe Stara Zagora	10	(0)
2021	Tsarsko Selo	1	(0)
2022	Arda Kardzhali	3	(0)
2022–	Yantra Gabrovo	100	(0)

International career
2017–2018	Bulgaria U21	2	(0)
- * Club domestic league appearances and goals as of 25 May 2026

Hristiyan Vasilev (Bulgarian: Християн Василев; born 5 December 1997) is a Bulgarian professional footballer who plays as a goalkeeper for Bulgarian Second League club Yantra Gabrovo.

== Career ==
=== Yantra Gabrovo ===
A product of the youth academy of Slavia Sofia, Vasilev was loaned out to Yantra Gabrovo in January 2016.

=== Vitosha Bistritsa ===
In June 2016, he joined Vitosha Bistritsa. He made his debut for the team on 8 August 2016 in a league match against Ludogorets Razgrad II keeping a clean sheet. On 2 June 2017 he kept a clean sheet in the play-off match against Neftochimic won by Vitosha with 1:0 and won promotion to the top division for the first time in their history.

On 17 July 2017 he signed his first long-term professional contract with the team. He completed his professional First League debut on 30 July 2017 in match against Levski Sofia. Vasilev left the team in June 2020.

=== Beroe ===
In July 2020, Vassilev joined Beroe Stara Zagora.

== International career ==
Vasilev made his debut for Bulgaria U21 on 8 June 2017 in a friendly match against Georgia U21.

He received his first call up for the Bulgaria on 12 November for the UEFA Nations League matches against Finland on 15 November 2020 and Republic of Ireland on 18 November.

== Career statistics ==
=== Club ===
As of 23 August 2017

Club performance			League		Cup		Continental		Other		Total	
Club	League	Season	Apps	Goals	Apps	Goals	Apps	Goals	Apps	Goals	Apps	Goals
Bulgaria			League		Bulgarian Cup		Europe		Other		Total	
Yantra Gabrovo (loan)	V Group	2015–16	16	0	0	0	–		–		16	0
Vitosha Bistritsa	Second League	2016–17	28	0	0	0	–		1	0	29	0
Vitosha Bistritsa	First League	2017–18	2	0	0	0	–		–		2	0
Vitosha Bistritsa	Total		30	0	0	0	0	0	1	0	31	0
Career statistics			46	0	0	0	0	0	1	0	47	0
