= FC Yantra Gabrovo =

Bulgarian football club

Yantra
- Full name: FC Yantra Gabrovo
- Nickname: Ковачите (The Blacksmiths)
- Founded: 21st September 1919; 107 years ago
- Ground: Stadion Hristo Botev, Gabrovo
- Capacity: 12,000
- Chairman: Nikolay Minchev
- Head coach: Emanuel Lukanov
- League: Second League
- 2025–26: Second League, 2nd of 17
- Website: www.fcyantra.bg
Home colours	Away colours

FC Yantra (Bulgarian: ФК Янтра) is a Bulgarian football club based in Gabrovo, which plays in Second League, the second tier of Bulgarian football. The club was originally founded in 1919 and home matches are played at Stadion Hristo Botev. Its home stadium has a capacity of 12 000 seats. Club colors are green and white.

== History ==
The club was founded in the summer of 1919 under the name of FC City of Gabrovo. Its founders are Hristo Bobchev, dr. Dencho Nedyalkov, Simeon Kostov, Kosta Tepavicharov, Nikola Vulnarov, Nencho Dimitrov, Hristofor Negentsov, Hristofor Stomonyakov, Hristo Karafezov, Dimitar Popov, Sava Mihailov, Ivan, Naniu and Georgi Nenov. On 21 September 1919 the club played its first game against Gorna Oryahovitsa and won 1:0. The starting eleven for this game were: Sava Mihailov (goalkeeper), Ivan Nanev, Nikola Rashev, Georgi Nanev, Simeon Kostov, Nikola Vulnarov, Stoyan Nanev, Dosiu Peev, Hristo Bobchev, Nencho Dimitrov and Nencho Stoyanov. In the beginning of 1920 the club joined gymnastics association Yunak, but later this year separates and takes a new name sports club Balkan, which is followed by another change - FC Oto. The latter comes from one of the players - Spiridon Nedevsky, nicknamed Oto. Because he had a strong desire to get the ball while on the field he had constantly yelled at his teammates 'ot, ot!' this became a byword for the team. The club subsequently changed its name to Aprilov, FC Chardafon, Chardafon-Orlovets. They participated to Bulgarian Championship as Tarnovo Region champion at seasons of 1928–29, 1931–32, 1932–33, 1933–34 and as Gabrovo Region champion at seasons of 1944-45 and 1947–48. The best result was quarter final in 1944–45. The name FC Yantra came up in 1973, and is used until now (excluding the period 1994 - 2001 when, after a relegation for a corruption case, it played under the name FC Chardafon).

Yantra has played in Bulgarian A Football Group for a total of eight seasons. It made its debut during season 1970–71. Yantra managed to surprise many, finishing in eight place, comfortably avoiding relegation. Next season, however, Yantra could not replicate their success, finishing in last place, and suffering relegation after two seasons in the elite. Yantra also had six points deducted due to bribery allegations.

Yantra maintained a strong form in the B Group, managing to secure promotion to the top level after just one season away. For the 1973–74 season, Yantra again defied the odds, finishing 12th. However, their form dropped in the next season, and Yantra again fell into the B Group after two seasons in the elite.

After this second relegation, Yantra did not manage to recover quickly and the team spent the next fifteen seasons in the lower tiers of Bulgarian football, mostly the B Group. In 1990, Yantra finally returned to the A Group and finished 14th for the 1990–91 season. The next two seasons were even more successful, as Yantra finished 9th and 11th, respectively. This fine period in the club's history ended abruptly, however, in 1994. Yantra was administratively relegated to the B Group after only eight rounds during the 1993–94 season, as it was discovered the club was involved in a bribery scheme with Beroe Stara Zagora. After this scandal, Yantra began to decline and eventually the club dropped into the amateur levels of football.

During season 2005–06, the club was relegated to the third tier of Bulgarian football. Next season (2006–07), Yantra won the North-West "V" Football Bulgarian group and promoted to "B" West Football Group. However, season 2007-08 was not good for Yantra, as they were relegated to the third division (North-West "V" Bulgarian Football group) with 6-wins, 6-draw, 14-loses, GF:GA-31:48, Points:24.

After the end of the season 2008/2009 with the club's financial instability FC Yantra, 4th in the season and the new participant group Yantra 2000 (Gabrovo) were merged after drawing the program. The new team was named FC Yantra 1919 (Gabrovo) and played their home games at the stadium Hristo Botev, Gabrovo. The new team changed its home colours and play with black shirts, green shorts and black socks.

Due to financial reasons, FC Yantra gave up participation in the North-West "V" football group on 23 March 2012.

In 2016, the newly reformed Yantra Gabrovo managed to promote to the V AFG, for the first time since their bankruptcy in 2012. This team claims to be the successor of the entity that existed before, thus carrying its traditions. A separate team from Gabrovo, called Yantra Gabrovo 1919 also promoted to the third tier in 2017. This meant that both teams were to play their home games at the Hristo Botev Stadium in Gabrovo. However, Yantra Gabrovo 1919 was relegated at the end of the 2017-18 season, leaving the original Yantra Gabrovo in the third tier.

On July 8, 2019, the two clubs from Gabrovo decided to merge and form one club, called Yantra Gabrovo 2019. Yantra finished first in the 2019-20 season in the third level, securing promotion to the Second League.

== Players ==
=== Current squad ===
As of 7 September 2026

Note: Flags indicate national team as defined under FIFA eligibility rules; some limited exceptions apply. Players may hold more than one non-FIFA nationality.

No.	Pos.	Nation	Player
1	GK	BUL	Hristiyan Vasilev
3	DF	BUL	Velizar Kanalyan
4	DF	BUL	Konstantin Ivanov
5	DF	BUL	Asen Georgiev
6	MF	BUL	Petar Kazakov (captain)
7	DF	BUL	Kolyo Stanev
9	FW	BUL	Milcho Angelov
10	MF	BUL	Ayvan Angelov
11	DF	BUL	Aleksandar Georgiev
12	GK	BUL	Hristo Lalev

No.	Pos.	Nation	Player
14	MF	BUL	Yoan Anastasov
15	MF	BUL	Martin Raynov
16	DF	BUL	Ivaylo Enchev
17	MF	BUL	Martin Ganchev
18	MF	BUL	Martin Portarski
19	FW	BUL	Yoan Yordanov
21	MF	BUL	Ivan Kokonov
24	DF	BUL	Tihomir Dimitrov
71	MF	BUL	Toni Ivanov
89	DF	BUL	Martin Angelov

For recent transfers, see Transfers winter 2025–26 and Transfers summer 2026.

=== Foreign players ===
EU Nationals

EU Nationals (Dual citizenship)

Non-EU Nationals

=== Technical staff ===
Name	Role
(Bulgaria) Borislav Stoychev	Head coach
(Bulgaria) Iskren Pisarov	Assistant
(Bulgaria) Nikolay Vasilev	Assistant
(Bulgaria) Iliyan Vasilev	Goalkeeping coach
(Bulgaria) Daniel Gadzhev	Conditioning Coach

== Notable players ==
Had international caps for their respective countries, held any club record, or had more than 100 league appearances. Players whose name is listed in bold represented their countries.

Bulgaria

- (Bulgaria) Georgi Dermendzhiev
- (Bulgaria) Aleksandar Dimitrov
- (Bulgaria) Toni Ivanov
- (Bulgaria) Miroslav Ivanov
- (Bulgaria) Plamen Kozhuharov
- (Bulgaria) **Martin Kushev**
- (Bulgaria) **Zdravko Lazarov**
- (Bulgaria) **Vladimir Manchev**
- (Bulgaria) **Yordan Murlev**
- (Bulgaria) **Tsvetomir Parvanov**
- (Bulgaria) Iskren Pisarov
- (Bulgaria) **Kostadin Yanchev**
- (Bulgaria) **Antoni Zdravkov**

Moldova

- (Moldova) **Vladislav Nemescalo**

== Managers ==
- **Dimitar Aleksiev**
- **Krasen Marinov**
- **Plamen Markov** (1990–92), (1996–97)
- **Velislav Vutsov** (2001–02) Winning the Amateur football league cup, and promoted club to Bulgarian B PFG after play off
- **Todor Todorov** (2004-6 April)
- **Stoyan Filipov** (April 2006–07) promoted club to "B" PFG after winning Bulgarian North-West C AFG
- **Veselin Antonov** (2007-March 2008)
- **Ilian Vasilev** (March 2008-May 2008)
- **Hristo Kirilov** (August 2008-June 2009)
- **Plamen Iliev** (July 2009 - December 2009)
- **Nikolay Iliev - Galibata** (December 2009 - March 2010)
- **Veselin Antonov** (April 2010-December 2010)
- **Radia Doichev** (January 2011-July 2011)
- **Nikolay Vasilev** (August 2011-?)
- **Stoyan Atsarov** (May 2020–October 2020)
- **Kostadin Angelov** (October 2020–August 2021)
- **Sasho Angelov** (August 2021–September 2022)
- **Zhivko Zhelev** (2022–2023)
- **Velislav Vutsov** (2023–2024)
- **Todor Kiselichkov** (2024–2025)

== Honours ==
=== Domestic ===
- Cup of Bulgarian Amateur Football League:
  - Winners (1): 2002
- Bulgarian Second League:
  - Winners (3): 1970,1973,1990

=== International ===
- UEFA Intertoto Cup: 1993 Group Stage

Pos	Team	Pld	W	D	L	GF	GA	GD	Pts
1	(Austria) Rapid Wien	4	3	1	0	14	4	+10	**7**
2	(Poland) Zawisza Bydgoszcz	4	1	2	1	8	4	+4	**4**
3	(Sweden) Halmstads BK	4	2	0	2	3	4	−1	**4**
4	(Denmark) Brøndby IF	4	2	0	2	11	15	−4	**4**
5	(Bulgaria) Yantra	4	0	1	3	4	13	−9	**1**

== Past seasons ==
- 8 participations in Bulgarian A Professional Football Group.
- 38 participations in Bulgarian B Professional Football Group.
- 1995/1996 Bulgarian B PFG (II) **9th place** - under the name FC Chardafon
- 1996/1997 Bulgarian B PFG **6th place** under the name FC Chardafon
- 1997/1998 Bulgarian B PFG **7th place** under the name FC Chardafon
- 1998/1999 Bulgarian B PFG **14th place** ▼ - relegated to V AFG under the name FC Chardafon
- 1999/2000 Bulgarian V AFG (III) **11th place** - under the name FC Chardafon
- 2000/2001 Bulgarian V AFG **8th place** - under the name FC Chardafon; after end of the season the team changed its name to **FC Yantra**
- 2001/2002 Bulgarian V AFG **2nd place** ▲ - promoted to B PFG after winning the playoff against Shumen 2001 with 2:0.
- 2002/2003 Bulgarian B PFG (II) **9th place** ▼ - due to a lack of finances FC Yantra were at the brink of dissolving and failed to show up for their first match with Chavdar Byala Slatina; because of this, the club were relegated to V AFG
- 2003/2004 Bulgarian V AFG (III) **3rd place**
- 2004/2005 Bulgarian V AFG **1st place** ▲ - promoted to B PFG
- 2005/2006 Bulgarian B PFG (II) **13th place** ▼ - relegated to V AFG
- 2006/2007 Bulgarian V AFG (III) **1st place** ▲ - promoted to B PFG
- 2007/2008 Bulgarian B PFG (II) **13th place** ▼ - relegated to V AFG
- 2008/2009 Bulgarian V AFG (III) **4th place**
- 2009/2010 Bulgarian V AFG **11th place**
- 2010/2011 Bulgarian V AFG **4th place**
- 2011/2012 Bulgarian V AFG **14th place** ▼ - relegated to the Regional AFG
- 2012/2013 Bulgarian Regional AFG (IV) **1st place** ▲ - promoted to V AFG
- 2013/2014 Bulgarian V AFG (III) **13th place**
- 2014/2015 Bulgarian V AFG **7th place**
- 2015/2016 Bulgarian V AFG **14th place**
- 2016/2017 Third League **10th place**
- 2017/2018 Third League **7th place**

== Contacts ==
3 Debel dial Str. 5300 Gabrovo, Bulgaria tel. +359-66-808353

== See also ==
- Prodan Tiskov - Chardafon
