= 2015–16 PFC CSKA Sofia season =

CSKA Sofia
2015–16 season
- Controlling owner: Grisha Ganchev
- Manager: Hristo Yanev
- V Group: 1st
- Bulgarian Cup: Winner
Home colours	Away colours	Third colours

The 2015–16 season was PFC CSKA Sofia's 1st season in the Bulgarian V Football Group. CSKA started the 2015/2016 season in V group (3rd division) as they did not receive a licence to play in A group due to unpaid debts. CSKA finished in first place in the standings. This article shows player statistics and all matches (official and friendly) that the club will play during the 2015–16 season.

== Players ==
=== Squad stats ===
No.	Pos	Nat	Player	Total		V Group		Bulgarian Cup	
No.	Pos	Nat	Player	Apps	Goals	Apps	Goals	Apps	Goals
1	GK	(Bulgaria) BUL	Anatoli Gospodinov	24	0	14	0	10	0
3	DF	(Bulgaria) BUL	Kiril Dinchev	31	1	20+2	0	9	1
4	DF	(Bulgaria) BUL	Bozhidar Chorbadzhiyski	36	1	25+1	0	10	1
5	DF	(Bulgaria) BUL	Nikolay Dichev	7	2	3+4	2	0	0
6	DF	(Bulgaria) BUL	Aleksandar Branekov	13	1	10	1	3	0
7	MF	(Bulgaria) BUL	Momchil Tsvetanov	21	9	16+2	8	3	1
8	MF	(Bulgaria) BUL	Boris Galchev	30	18	21+1	16	8	2
9	FW	(Bulgaria) BUL	Preslav Yordanov	26	33	13+4	23	8+1	10
10	MF	(Bulgaria) BUL	Aleksandar Aleksandrov	19	4	10+8	4	1	0
11	MF	(Bulgaria) BUL	Pavel Golovodov	19	9	9+6	8	4	1
12	GK	(Bulgaria) BUL	Stoyan Kolev	17	0	17	0	0	0
13	MF	(Bulgaria) BUL	Yordan Yordanov	36	7	26+2	7	7+1	0
14	MF	(Bulgaria) BUL	Samir Ayass	37	14	26+3	12	8	2
15	GK	(Bulgaria) BUL	Slavi Petrov	0	0	0	0	0	0
16	MF	(Bulgaria) BUL	Petar Vitanov	28	1	10+13	1	1+4	0
17	DF	(Bulgaria) BUL	Milen Kikarin	33	1	24+2	0	6+1	1
18	MF	(Bulgaria) BUL	Aykut Ramadan	4	0	0+4	0	0	0
19	DF	(Bulgaria) BUL	Valentin Antov	5	0	0+4	0	1	0
19	MF	(Bulgaria) BUL	Mario Yordanov	2	2	0+2	2	0	0
20	FW	(Bulgaria) BUL	Stanislav Malamov	15	3	10+2	2	3	1
21	DF	(Bulgaria) BUL	Viktor Raychev	28	1	16+3	0	5+4	1
22	MF	(Bulgaria) BUL	Nikolay Tsvetkov	38	22	20+9	19	9	3
23	DF	(Bulgaria) BUL	Vasil Popov	12	0	5+1	0	0+6	0
24	FW	(Bulgaria) BUL	Kostadin Hazurov	32	36	18+8	31	2+4	5
25	DF	(Bulgaria) BUL	Angel Granchov	26	1	20	1	6	0
Players sold or loaned out after the start of the season:
5	MF	(Bulgaria) BUL	Ivo Ivanov	11	1	2+3	1	3+3	0
18	MF	(Bulgaria) BUL	Radoy Bozhilov	8	3	3+2	0	1+2	3
23	MF	(Bulgaria) BUL	Vladislav Uzunov	13	2	4+3	2	2+4	0

As of 29 May 2016

== Players in/out ==
=== Summer transfers ===
In: Note: Flags indicate national team as defined under FIFA eligibility rules; some limited exceptions apply. Players may hold more than one non-FIFA nationality.

No.	Pos.	Nation	Player
2	DF	BUL	Vasil Popov (loan return from Etar Veliko Tarnovo)
3	DF	BUL	Kiril Dinchev (from (North Macedonia) Pelister)
4	DF	BUL	Bozhidar Chorbadzhiyski (loan return from Pirin Blagoevgrad)
5	MF	BUL	Ivo Ivanov (from Lokomotiv Sofia)
6	DF	BUL	Aleksandar Branekov (from Lokomotiv Sofia)
7	MF	BUL	Momchil Tsvetanov (from Botev Plovdiv)
9	FW	BUL	Preslav Yordanov (from Lokomotiv Sofia)
10	MF	BUL	Aleksandar Aleksandrov (from Minyor Pernik)
12	GK	BUL	Stoyan Kolev (returned from retirement)
13	MF	BUL	Yordan Yordanov (from Minyor Pernik)
14	MF	BUL	Samir Ayass (from Beroe Stara Zagora)
17	DF	BUL	Milen Kikarin (from Minyor Pernik)
18	FW	BUL	Radoy Bozhilov (loan return from Dobrudzha Dobrich)
20	FW	BUL	Stanislav Malamov (from Haskovo)
21	DF	BUL	Viktor Raychev (from Minyor Pernik)
22	MF	BUL	Nikolay Tsvetkov (from Lokomotiv Mezdra)
23	MF	BUL	Vladislav Uzunov (from Haskovo)
24	FW	BUL	Kostadin Hazurov (from (Israel) Maccabi Petah Tikva)
25	DF	BUL	Angel Granchov (from Slavia Sofia)

Out: Note: Flags indicate national team as defined under FIFA eligibility rules; some limited exceptions apply. Players may hold more than one non-FIFA nationality.

No.	Pos.	Nation	Player
3	DF	BUL	Aleksandar Tunchev (to Lokomotiv Plovdiv)
4	MF	NGR	Sunny (to (Turkey) Alanyaspor)
5	DF	CRO	Mario Brkljača (to (Slovenia) Krka)
5	DF	BUL	Emil Grozev (to Vereya Stara Zagora)
7	MF	POR	Toni Silva (to (Turkey) Şanlıurfaspor)
9	FW	MNE	Stefan Nikolić (to (Croatia) Istra 1961)
10	MF	SRB	Ivan Marković (to (Greece) Levadiakos)
11	MF	SRB	Nemanja Milisavljević (to Beroe Stara Zagora)
13	FW	LUX	Aurélien Joachim (to (England) Burton Albion)
14	DF	BUL	Valentin Iliev (to (Romania) Universitatea Craiova)
14	FW	BUL	Grigor Dolapchiev (to Oborishte Panagyurishte)
15	MF	IND	Renedy Singh (to (India) Kerala Blasters FC)
19	DF	BUL	Apostol Popov (to (Romania) Universitatea Craiova)
19	MF	BUL	Dimitar Panteleev (to Strumska Slava Radomir)
19	FW	BUL	Aleksandar Asparuhov (to Strumska Slava Radomir)
20	MF	CPV	Platini (to (Egypt) El Ittihad Alexandria)
21	DF	BUL	Ventsislav Vasilev (to Beroe Stara Zagora)
22	MF	BRA	Edenilson (to Pirin Blagoevgrad)
24	DF	BUL	Yuliyan Chapaev (to (Germany) RB Leipzig)
28	MF	BUL	Marquinhos (to Pirin Blagoevgrad)
31	DF	NED	Christian Supusepa (to (Netherlands) Sparta Rotterdam)
33	GK	CZE	Jakub Diviš (to (Czech Republic) FK Mladá Boleslav)
34	MF	GER	Denis Prychynenko (to (Germany) 1. FC Union Berlin)
48	DF	CRO	Marin Oršulić (to (Norway) Tromsø IL)
66	DF	BUL	Plamen Krachunov (to Montana)
70	MF	BRA	Juan Felipe (to (North Macedonia) Vardar Skopje)
73	MF	BUL	Ivan Stoyanov (to Vereya Stara Zagora)
77	DF	CRO	Tonći Kukoč (to (Italy) Livorno)
92	GK	LAT	Maksims Uvarenko (to (Slovakia) Zlaté Moravce)
99	GK	BUL	Stoyan Kolev (Retired)

=== Winter transfers ===
In: Note: Flags indicate national team as defined under FIFA eligibility rules; some limited exceptions apply. Players may hold more than one non-FIFA nationality.

No.	Pos.	Nation	Player
5	DF	BUL	Nikolay Dichev (from Bansko)
18	MF	BUL	Aykut Ramadan (from Litex Lovech II)

Out: Note: Flags indicate national team as defined under FIFA eligibility rules; some limited exceptions apply. Players may hold more than one non-FIFA nationality.

No.	Pos.	Nation	Player
5	MF	BUL	Ivo Ivanov (to Spartak Pleven)
18	FW	BUL	Radoy Bozhilov (to FC Sofia)
23	MF	BUL	Vladislav Uzunov (to Dobrudzha Dobrich)

== Pre-season and friendlies ==
Win Draw Loss Fixtures

=== Pre-season ===
10 July 2015	CSKA	0–1	Spartak Pleven	Teteven
18:00	Dolapchiev (yellow card) 45'; Uzunov (yellow card) 84'	Report	Hristov 25'; I. Todorov (yellow card) 43'	Stadium: Stadion Georgi Benkovski; Attendance: 4,000; Referee: Nikola Petrov

14 July 2015	CSKA	2–0	Litex II	Teteven
10:00	Hazurov 25' (pen.); P. Yordanov 78'	Report	Daskalov (yellow card) 45'	Stadium: Stadion Georgi Benkovski; Attendance: 100

18 July 2015	CSKA	1–0	Oborishte	Sofia
18:00	Golovodov 51'; Kolev (yellow card) 20'; Malamov (yellow card) 69'; Galchev (yellow card) 78'	Report	Ivanov (yellow card) 15'; Parpulov (yellow card) 87'; Zdravkov (yellow card) 90'	Stadium: Stadion Balgarska Armiya; Attendance: 4,000

22 July 2015	CSKA	3–1	Maritsa	Sofia
18:00	Uzunov 18'; Hazurov 49'; Tsvetkov 90+1'	Report	Stefanov 56'	Stadium: Stadion Balgarska Armiya

25 July 2015	CSKA	5–1	Vihren	Sofia
18:00	Aleksandrov 5'; Y. Yordanov 10'; P. Yordanov 15'; Malamov 21'; Tsvetanov 53'	Report	Laskov 45' (pen.)	Stadium: Stadion Balgarska Armiya

2 August 2015	CSKA (Bulgaria)	0–1	(Israel) Ironi Ashdod	Sofia
20:00		Report	Avitan 43'	Stadium: Stadion Balgarska Armiya
Note: abandoned in 89th minute due to a pitch invasion by CSKA fans

=== Mid-season ===
21 January 2016	CSKA (Bulgaria)	4–2	(Ukraine) Oleksandriya	Alaniya, Turkey
17:00	Tsvetanov 10', 28'; Hazurov 25'; P. Yordanov 90'	Report	Leonov 26'; Banada 43'	Stadium: Gold City Hotel Training Ground

1 February 2016	CSKA (Bulgaria)	0–1	(Greece) Skoda Xanthi	Xanthi, Greece
15:00		Report	Farkaš 38'	Stadium: Skoda Xanthi Arena

3 February 2016	CSKA (Bulgaria)	2–2	(Greece) Panthrakikos	Alexandroupoli, Greece
15:30	Tsvetanov 23'; Dichev 25'	Report	Watsukanidis 38'; Yorgopoulous 89'	Stadium: Fotis Kosmas Stadium

14 February 2016	CSKA	6–0	Dunav	Sofia
14:00	Malamov 14'; Tsvetanov 55'; Tsvetkov 60', 72'; Vitanov 68'; Aleksandrov 71'	Report		Stadium: Stadion Balgarska Armiya

== Competitions ==
=== V Group ===
==== Table ====
Pos	Team	Pld	W	D	L	GF	GA	GD	Pts	Qualification or relegation
1	CSKA Sofia (P)	32	31	1	0	146	10	+136	94	Promoted to Second League
2	Vitosha Bistritsa	32	23	5	4	72	16	+56	74	
3	Slivnishki Geroy	32	21	6	5	80	35	+45	69	
4	Strumska Slava	32	18	6	8	58	36	+22	60	
5	Minyor Pernik	32	17	8	7	55	35	+20	59	

Source: bulgarian-football.com, Soccerway
Rules for classification: 1) Points; 2) Head-to-head points; 3) Head-to-head goal difference; 4) Head-to-head goals scored; 5) Head-to-head away goals scored (only if two teams); 6) Goal difference; 7) Goals scored; 8) Fairplay ranking; 9) Draw.
(P) Promoted

==== Results summary ====
Overall								Home						Away					
Pld	W	D	L	GF	GA	GD	Pts	W	D	L	GF	GA	GD	W	D	L	GF	GA	GD
32	31	1	0	146	10	+136	94	15	1	0	90	6	+84	16	0	0	56	4	+52

Last updated: 29 May 2016.
Source: Soccerway

==== Results by round ====
Round	1	2	3	4	5	6	7	8	9	10	11	12	13	14	15	16	17	18	19	20	21	22	23	24	25	26	27	28	29	30	31	32	33	34
Ground	H	A	H	A	H	A	H	A	H	A	H	H	A	-	A	H	A	A	H	A	H	A	H	A	H	A	H	A	A	H	-	H	A	H
Result	W	W	W	W	W	W	W	W	W	W	W	W	W	-	W	W	W	W	W	W	W	W	W	W	W	W	W	W	W	D	-	W	W	W
Position	2	1	1	1	1	1	1	1	1	1	1	1	1	1	1	1	1	1	1	1	1	1	1	1	1	1	1	1	1	1	1	1	1	1

Source: See Results
A = Away; H = Home; W = Win; D = Draw; L = Loss

==== Fixtures and results ====
9 August 2015 1	CSKA	3–0	Strumska Slava	Sofia
18:00	P. Yordanov 22'; Y. Yordanov 86'; Branekov 89'	Report		Stadium: Stadion Balgarska Armiya; Attendance: 7,000; Referee: Georgi Ignatov (Sofia)

16 August 2015 2	Septemvri	0–3	CSKA	Sofia
18:00		Report	Hazurov 15', 42' (pen.); Galchev 77'	Stadium: Stadion Lokomotiv; Attendance: 5,500; Referee: Ivaylo Stoyanov (Petrich)

23 August 2015 3	CSKA	7–0	Chepinets	Sofia
18:00	Hazurov 8' (pen.), 9'; Y. Yordanov 12'; Golovodov 33', 50'; Galchev 39'; Ayass 85'	Report		Stadium: Stadion Balgarska Armiya; Attendance: 5,000; Referee: Petar Dorovski (Sofia)

30 August 2015 4	Botev	0–3	CSKA	Sofia
15:30		Report	Galchev 63', 90+3'; P. Yordanov 86'	Stadium: Stadion Lokomotiv; Attendance: 3,000; Referee: Mladen Penev (Kyustendil)

6 September 2015 5	CSKA	6–0	Velbazhd	Sofia
17:00	Golovodov 7'; P. Yordanov 16', 38', 52'; Galchev 59'; Uzunov 86'	Report		Stadium: Stadion Balgarska Armiya; Attendance: 5,000; Referee: Borislav Nenkov (Sofia)

13 September 2015 6	Chiko	0–2	CSKA	Pazardzhik
14:15		Report	Hazurov 61' (pen.), 89'	Stadium: Stadion Georgi Benkovski; Attendance: 6,000; Referee: Dimitar Burov (Sofia)

20 September 2015 7	CSKA	8–0	Sofia 2010	Sofia
17:00	Ayass 9'; Y. Yordanov 23', 31', 45'; Ivanov 37'; Hazurov 42', 67', 73'	Report		Stadium: Stadion Balgarska Armiya; Attendance: 2,000; Referee: Simeon Velikov (Blagoevgrad)

27 September 2015 8	Rilski Sportist	0–3	CSKA	Samokov
14:30		Report	Hazurov (penalty missed) 21'; Uzunov 21'; Ayass 45'; P. Yordanov 72' (pen.)	Stadium: Stadion Iskar; Attendance: 2,000; Referee: Stefan Apostolov (Simitli)

4 October 2015 9	CSKA	8–0	Belasitsa	Sofia
16:00	Galchev 7', 89'; P. Yordanov 45+1', 49', 60'; Tanchev 52' (o.g.); Tsvetkov 56', 71'	Report		Stadium: Stadion Balgarska Armiya; Attendance: 7,000; Referee: Georgi Andreev (Sofia)

11 October 2015 10	Vihren	1–5	CSKA	Sandanski
16:00	Branekov 81' (o.g.)	Report	Y. Yordanov 7'; Tsvetkov 10', 31'; Hazurov 33', 43'	Stadium: Stadion Sandanski; Attendance: 2,000; Referee: Petar Dorovski (Sofia)

18 October 2015 11	CSKA	3–0	Vitosha	Sofia
14:30				Stadium: Stadion Balgarska Armiya; Referee: Tasko Taskov (Sofia)
Note: Vitosha Bistritsa declined participation in the game due to fear of political provocation and disturbances during the game.

21 October 2015 12	CSKA	3–0	Germaneya	Sofia
16:00	Tsvetanov 2', 17'; Hazurov 90'	Report		Stadium: Stadion Balgarska Armiya; Attendance: 2,000; Referee: Stanimir Trenchev (Sofia)

4 November 2015 13	Slivnishki Geroy	0–2	CSKA	Sofia
18:00		Report	P. Yordanov 72'; Vitanov 87'	Stadium: Stadion Balgarska Armiya; Attendance: 3,000; Referee: Angel Angelov (Sofia)

14	CSKA	bye

15 November 2015 15	Balkan	0–2	CSKA	Pazardzhik
14:00		Report	Hazurov 52'; Ayass 87'	Stadium: Stadion Georgi Benkovski; Attendance: 4,500; Referee: Georgi Dimitrov (Sofia)

22 November 2015 16	CSKA	4–0	Pirin	Sofia
14:00	Ayass 6'; Tsvetanov 21'; Tsvetkov 73'; Galchev 76'	Report		Stadium: Stadion Balgarska Armiya; Attendance: 1,500; Referee: Metodi Pavlov (Sofia)

29 November 2015 17	Minyor	0–3	CSKA	Pernik
14:00		Report	Tsvetkov 26'; P. Yordanov 49'; Tsvetanov 69'	Stadium: Stadion Minyor; Attendance: 2,500; Referee: Volen Chinkov (Sofia)

21 February 2016 18	Strumska Slava	0–2	CSKA	Sofia
18:30		Report	Galchev 44'; P. Yordanov 90+1'	Stadium: Stadion Balgarska Armiya; Attendance: 3,000; Referee: Vangel Vangelov (Sofia)

28 February 2016 19	CSKA	8–1	Septemvri	Sofia
14:45	Tsvetanov 1'; Hazurov 8', 50', 90+1'; Ayass 17', 55'; Tsvetkov 70' (pen.), 86'	Report	Nikolov 45+2' (pen.)	Stadium: Stadion Balgarska Armiya; Attendance: 2,000; Referee: Stanimir Trenchev (Sofia)

6 March 2016 20	Chepinets	0–4	CSKA	Velingrad
12:00		Report	Ayass 39'; P. Yordanov 47', 90+1'; Aleksandrov 84'	Stadium: Stadion Chepinets; Attendance: 3,500; Referee: Yoto Garabedov (Sofia)

13 March 2016 21	CSKA	11–0	Botev	Sofia
18:30	Golovodov 8', 43', 63'; P. Yordanov 18', 55'; Tsvetanov 33'; Hazurov 71', 90'; Galchev 74', 75'; Dichev 86'	Report		Stadium: Stadion Balgarska Armiya; Attendance: 2,000; Referee: Georgi Nikolov (Sofia)

20 March 2016 22	Velbazhd	0–3	CSKA	Kyustendil
15:00		Report	Tsvetkov 38'; Hazurov 47', 49'	Stadium: Stadion Osogovo; Attendance: 4,000; Referee: Volen Chinkov (Sofia)

23 March 2016 23	CSKA	5–0	Chiko	Sofia
18:00	Hazurov 3' (pen.), 23', 25'; Golovodov 59'; Tsvetkov 84'	Report		Stadium: Stadion Balgarska Armiya; Attendance: 2,000; Referee: Pavel Tsekov (Sofia)

27 March 2016 24	Sofia 2010	1–5	CSKA	Sofia
18:30	Bozhilov 85'	Report	Galchev 26', 79'; Ivanov 27' (o.g.); P. Yordanov 38'; Tsvetanov 42'	Stadium: Stadion Balgarska Armiya; Attendance: 2,200; Referee: Metodi Pavlov (Sofia)

2 April 2016 25	CSKA	5–2	Rilski Sportist	Sofia
15:30	Ayass 8'; Granchov 10'; Golovodov 22'; Galchev 56'; Aleksandrov 79'	Report	Lovkov 37'; Kirov 78' (pen.)	Stadium: Stadion Balgarska Armiya; Attendance: 2,000; Referee: Yordan Vodenicharov (Blagoevgrad)

10 April 2016 26	Belasitsa	2–4	CSKA	Gotse Delchev
15:30	Kabranov 55' (pen.), 84'	Report	Tsvetkov 17', 26', 59'; Aleksandrov 65'	Stadium: Gradski stadion Attendance: 2,000; Referee: Dimitar Burov (Sofia)

13 April 2016 27	CSKA	4–0	Vihren	Sofia
18:00	P. Yordanov 28' (pen.), 36'; Malamov 71'; Galchev 83'	Report		Stadium: Stadion Balgarska Armiya; Attendance: 600; Referee: Vasimir El-Hatib (Sofia)

24 April 2016 29	Germaneya	0–10	CSKA	Sofia
15:30		Report	Hazurov 7', 9' (pen.), 29', 43', 62', 87'; Tsvetkov 34', 41', 59', 72'	Stadium: Stadion Balgarska Armiya; Attendance: 1,500; Referee: Hristiyana Guteva (Sofia)

27 April 2016 30	CSKA	2–2	Slivnishki Geroy	Sofia
17:00	P. Yordanov 61'; Tsvetanov 80'	Report	Aleksandrov 31'; Dikov 76'	Stadium: Natsionalen stadion Vasil Levski; Attendance: 500; Referee: Georgi Ignatov (Sofia)

31	CSKA	bye

11 May 2016 33	Pirin	0–3	CSKA	Gotse Delchev
18:00		Report	Ayass 16'; Samokishev 28' (o.g.); Hazurov 59' (pen.)	Stadium: Gradski stadion Attendance: 1,500; Referee: Biser Nikiforov (Pernik)

15 May 2016 32	CSKA	7–0	Balkan	Sofia
18:00	P. Yordanov 6', 23' (pen.), 35'; Ayass 16'; Galchev 27'; Aleksandrov 81'; M. Yordanov 84'	Report		Stadium: Natsionalen stadion Vasil Levski; Attendance: 2,000; Referee: Krasimir Atanasov (Sofia)

18 May 2016 28	Vitosha	0–2	CSKA	Sofia
18:00		Report	Malamov 48'; Ayass 88'	Stadium: Stadion Lokomotiv; Attendance: 2,000; Referee: Ivaylo Stoyanov (Petrich)

29 May 2016 34	CSKA	6–1	Minyor	Sofia
18:00	Dichev 13'; Y. Yordanov 32'; Tsvetkov 34', 52'; Hazurov 61'; M. Yordanov 71'	Report	Todorov 87'	Stadium: Stadion Slavia; Attendance: 3,000; Referee: Stanimir Trenchev (Sofia)

=== Bulgarian Cup ===
19 August 2015 District SF	Sofia 2010	1–4	CSKA	Sofia
18:30	Ivanov 42' (o.g.)	Report	Stoev 12' (o.g.); P. Yordanov 23', 90'; Tsvetkov 29'	Stadium: Stadion Balgarska Armiya; Attendance: 3,500; Referee: Georgi Dimitrov (Sofia)

26 August 2015 District F	Septemvri	0–1	CSKA	Sofia
18:45		Report	P. Yordanov 90+5'	Stadium: Stadion Balgarska Armiya; Attendance: 1,500; Referee: Vihren Manev (Sofia)

2 September 2015 Regional SF	Saraya	0–11	CSKA	Pazardzhik
17:00		Report	Raychev 2'; Hazurov 19', 37', 44'; Kostov 31' (o.g.); Bozhilov 42', 48'; Dinchev 45+3'; P. Yordanov 52'; Tsvetkov 85'; Kikarin 88'	Stadium: Stadion Georgi Benkovski; Attendance: 9,000; Referee: Biser Nikiforov (Pernik)

9 September 2015 Regional F	CSKA	5–0	Botev	Sofia
20:00	Hazurov 6', 48'; Golovodov 57'; Bozhilov 76'; Chorbadzhiyski 85'	Report		Stadium: Stadion Balgarska Armiya; Attendance: 4,000; Referee: Angel Bayaltsaliev (Sofia)

23 September 2015 First Round	CSKA	3–1	Neftochimic	Sofia
18:45	P. Yordanov 17'; Ayass 53'; Galchev 55'	Report	Lyubenov 61'	Stadium: Stadion Balgarska Armiya; Attendance: 5,200; Referee: Boyan Slavkov (Plovdiv)

27 October 2015 Second Round	Spartak Pleven	0–2	CSKA	Pleven
13:30		Report	P. Yordanov 24', 85'	Stadium: Gradski stadion Attendance: 4,170; Referee: Stanislav Stavrov (Veliko Tarnovo)

10 December 2015 Quarterfinal	CSKA	3–0	Sozopol	Sofia
17:00	P. Yordanov 78', 86'; Tsvetanov 90+7'	Report		Stadium: Stadion Balgarska Armiya; Attendance: 4,330; Referee: Georgi Ignatov (Sofia)

6 April 2016 Semifinal Leg 1	Beroe	0–2	CSKA	Stara Zagora
19:15		Report	Ayass 5'; Galchev 54'	Stadium: Stadion Beroe; Attendance: 9,500; Referee: Tsvetan Krastev (Varna)

20 April 2016 Semifinal Leg 2	CSKA	2–0 (4–0 agg.)	Beroe	Sofia
20:00	P. Yordanov 3'; Tsvetkov 41'	Report		Stadium: Stadion Balgarska Armiya; Attendance: 15,000; Referee: Ivaylo Stoyanov (Petrich)

24 May 2016 Final	CSKA	1–0	Montana	Sofia
20:00	Malamov 12'	Report		Stadium: Natsionalen stadion Vasil Levski; Attendance: 33,345; Referee: Stanislav Todorov (Shumen)

=== Amateur Cup ===
On 24 September CSKA was drawn to play against Vitosha Bistritsa for the BAFL Cup. However, several hours after the draw the club cancelled its participation, citing its growing problems with injured and exhausted players. In doing so, CSKA will be fined with 700 BGN for its refusal of participation.

== See also ==
- PFC CSKA Sofia
