= 2016 Bulgarian Cup final =

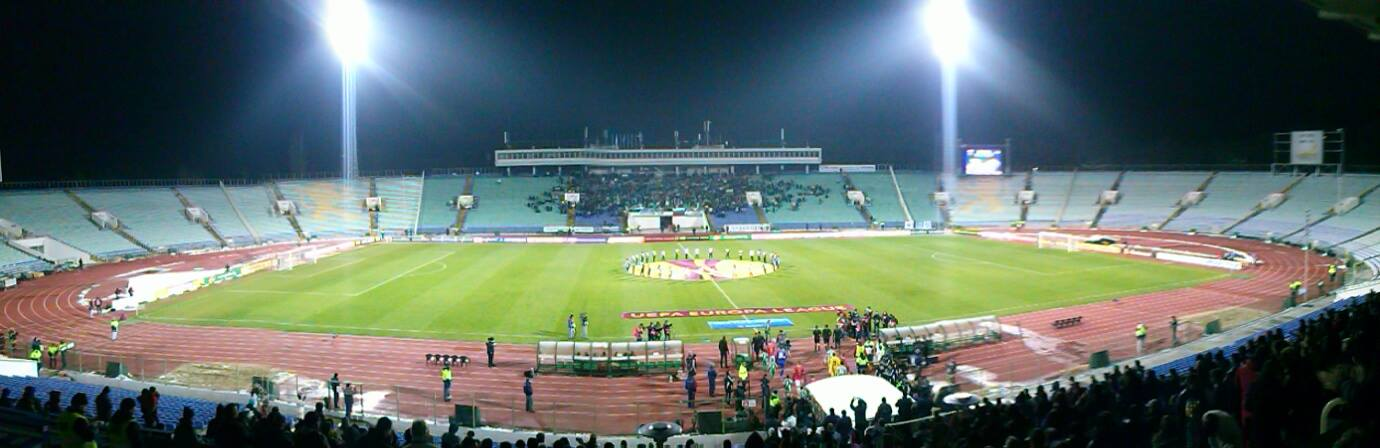
- Event: 2015–16 Bulgarian Cup
Montana	CSKA Sofia
A Group	V Group
0	1
- Date: 24 May 2016
- Venue: Vasil Levski National Stadium, Sofia
- Referee: Stanislav Todorov (Shumen)
- Attendance: 33,345

The 2016 Bulgarian Cup final was the 76th final of the Bulgarian Cup. The final took place on 24 May 2016 at Vasil Levski National Stadium in Sofia in front of 33,345 spectators. It was refereed by Stanislav Todorov, from Shumen.

The clubs contesting the final were Montana and CSKA Sofia. CSKA won the match 1–0 with a goal from Stanislav Malamov, claiming their 20th Bulgarian Cup. The "redmen" were, however, not able to participate in the 2016-2017 edition of the UEFA Europa League due to a ban imposed by the UEFA Club Financial Control Body.

== Background ==
CSKA Sofia were appearing in their 32nd Bulgarian Cup final and had won it on 19 of their previous 31 appearances. They also became only the fourth team from outside the A Group, since its foundation in 1948, to reach the final and the first team of third division.

For Montana, 2016 was their first appearance in a Bulgarian Cup final.

== Route to the final ==
Montana			Round	CSKA
Opponent	Result	Legs		Opponent	Result	Legs
–	–	–	Second preliminary round	Sofia 2010	4–1	home
–	–	–	Third preliminary round	Septemvri Sofia	1–0	home
–	–	–	Fourth preliminary round	Saraya	11–0	away
–	–	–	Fifth preliminary round	Botev Ihtiman	5–0	home
Pirin Gotse Delchev	3–1	away	First round	Neftochimic Burgas	3–1	home
Lokomotiv Plovdiv	1–1 (4–2p)	away	Second round	Spartak Pleven	2–0	away
Lokomotiv GO	1–1 (4–3p)	away	Quarter-finals	Sozopol	3–0	home
Litex Lovech	2–1	2–0 home; 0–1 away	Semi-finals	Beroe Stara Zagora	4–0	2–0 away; 2–0 home

== Match ==
=== Details ===
24 May 2016
20:00 EEST

Montana	0−1	CSKA Sofia
		Malamov 12'

Vasil Levski National Stadium, Sofia
Attendance: 33,345
Referee: Stanislav Todorov (Shumen)

Montana	CSKA

GK	33	(Bulgaria) Ivaylo Vasilev
RB	26	(Bulgaria) Yordan Todorov
CB	5	(Bulgaria) Asen Georgiev
CB	15	(Bulgaria) Georgi Angelov
LB	6	(Bulgaria) Hristofor Hubchev
DM	25	(Bulgaria) Stanislav Genchev		(substituted off) 83'
DM	16	(Bulgaria) Vladimir Michev (c)		(substituted off) 38'
CM	24	(Niger) Olivier Bonnes
RW	22	(Bulgaria) Sergey Georgiev	(yellow card) 82'
LW	10	(Bulgaria) Ivan Stoyanov
CF	7	(Bulgaria) Ivan Kokonov		(substituted off) 62'
Substitutes:
GK	1	(Bulgaria) Hristo Ivanov
MF	4	(Algeria) Nabil Ejenavi
MF	8	(Bulgaria) Ivan Minchev	(yellow card) 67'	(substituted on) 38'
FW	9	(Bulgaria) Atanas Iliev		(substituted on) 62'
DF	17	(Bulgaria) Georgi Pashov
MF	19	(Bulgaria) Tsvetan Varsanov
FW	20	(Bulgaria) Petar Atanasov		(substituted on) 83'
Manager:
(Bulgaria) Emil Velev

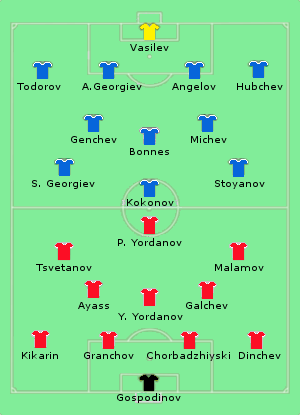

GK	1	(Bulgaria) Anatoli Gospodinov	(yellow card) 90+3'
RB	3	(Bulgaria) Kiril Dinchev
CB	4	(Bulgaria) Bozhidar Chorbadzhiyski
CB	25	(Bulgaria) Angel Granchov
LB	17	(Bulgaria) Milen Kikarin	(yellow card) 87'
DM	13	(Bulgaria) Yordan Yordanov
CM	8	(Bulgaria) Boris Galchev (c)	(yellow card) 59'
CM	14	(Bulgaria) Samir Ayass		(substituted off) 78'
RW	20	(Bulgaria) Stanislav Malamov
LW	7	(Bulgaria) Momchil Tsvetanov		(substituted off) 90+2'
CF	9	(Bulgaria) Preslav Yordanov		(substituted off) 88'
Substitutes:
GK	12	(Bulgaria) Stoyan Kolev
DF	5	(Bulgaria) Nikolay Dichev
MF	10	(Bulgaria) Aleksandar Aleksandrov
MF	16	(Bulgaria) Petar Vitanov		(substituted on) 78'
MF	22	(Bulgaria) Nikolay Tsvetkov		(substituted on) 90+2'
DF	23	(Bulgaria) Vasil Popov
FW	24	(Bulgaria) Kostadin Hazurov		(substituted on) 88'
Manager:
(Bulgaria) Hristo Yanev

MATCH OFFICIALS

- Assistant referees: Ivo Kolev & Georgi Doynov
- Fourth official: Ivaylo Stoyanov (Petrich)

MATCH RULES

- 90 minutes.
- 30 minutes of extra-time if necessary.
- Penalty shoot-out if scores still level.
- Seven named substitutes.
- Maximum of three substitutions.

== Match overview ==
CSKA Sofia had more opportunities to score during the first half, with Montana starting to look more dangerous after the half hour mark. The unmarked Stanislav Malamov netted with a header what would turn out to be the winning goal in the 12th minute of the match after an Angel Granchov assist following a Boris Galchev corner kick. Momchil Tsvetanov and Preslav Yordanov then had chances to double CSKA's advantage, but their shots lacked accuracy. Ivan Minchev went close to finding an equalizer right before the half time break, with his free kick going just inches wide of the target.

Shortly after the resumption of the match, Ivaylo Vasilev pulled off a good save after a Granchov attempt. In the 57th minute, the goalscorer Malamov hit the right post and 13 minutes later he saw his powerful close distance shot saved by Vasilev. Montana threatened on a number of occasions after the 70th minute until a Stanislav Genchev goal was disallowed for offside on the 75' mark. In the 77th minute, manager Emil Velev was sent to the stands by Stanislav Todorov for aggressively protesting against the referee's decisions. Montana started to send more men forward (with goalkeeper Vasilev entering CSKA's penalty area for a corner kick in the fourth minute of added time), but clearcut chances were lacking until the end of the match and CSKA Sofia managed to hold on for the 1−0 win, becoming the first third division club to secure the Bulgarian Cup.

== See also ==
- 2015–16 A Group
