= Aess =

Aess or AESS may refer to:

- Samir Aess or Ayass (born 1990), Bulgarian football player
- IEEE Aerospace and Electronic Systems Society
- Association of English Singers & Speakers, where Patricia Routledge was past president.
