= Ivo Ivanov =

Ivo Ivanov may refer to:

- Ivo Dimitrov Ivanov (born 30 July 1966), Bulgarian businessman and co-owner of CSKA Sofia
- Ivo Ivanov (footballer, born March 1985), Bulgarian footballer who plays for Beroe Stara Zagora
- Ivo Ivanov (footballer, born April 1985), Bulgarian footballer who plays for CSKA Sofia and previously for Lokomotiv Sofia
