= Kostadin Hazurov =

Bulgarian footballer

Personal information
- Full name: Kostadin Petrov Hazurov
- Date of birth: 5 August 1985 (age 41)
- Place of birth: Gotse Delchev, Bulgaria
- Height: 1.85 m (6 ft 1 in)
- Position: Forward

Team information
- Current team: CSKA 1948 (assistant)

Youth career
- Pirin Blagoevgrad

Senior career*
Years	Team	Apps	(Gls)
2001–2003	Pirin Blagoevgrad	41	(11)
2004–2005	CSKA Sofia	28	(11)
2005–2008	Litex Lovech	15	(0)
2006	→ Dunav Ruse (loan)	14	(7)
2007	→ Pirin Blagoevgrad (loan)	12	(4)
2008	→ Vidima-Rakovski (loan)	15	(6)
2008–2010	Minyor Pernik	59	(6)
2011–2012	Bnei Sakhnin	54	(18)
2012–2014	Lierse	42	(11)
2014–2015	Maccabi Petah Tikva	13	(1)
2015–2016	CSKA Sofia	26	(31)
2016–2017	Neftochimic	18	(1)
2017	CSKA 1948	1	(0)
2018	USD Nerostellati 1910	8	(0)
2018	Lokomotiv Sofia	15	(3)
Total		361	(110)

International career
2004–2006	Bulgaria U21		
2004	Bulgaria	1	(0)

Managerial career
- 2020–: CSKA 1948 (assistant)
- * Club domestic league appearances and goals

Kostadin Petrov Hazurov (Bulgarian: Костадин Петров Хазуров; born 5 August 1985) is a former Bulgarian footballer who played as a striker.

== Career ==
Hazurov began his career at Pirin. In 2004, he moved to CSKA Sofia making his official debut in Bulgarian A Professional Football Group in a match against Botev Plovdiv on 27 March 2004. The result of the match was 4:1 with win for CSKA. Two months later, in May 2004, Hazurov scored three goals against Belasitsa Petrich (he is the youngest player in the A PFG to have achieved such a feat). In the following season he scored 6 goals in 22 league games for the eventual league champions.

In 2005 Hazurov joined Litex Lovech. On 14 August 2005, he sustained an injury in a match against his former club CSKA Sofia, which kept him out of action for five months, but eventually Hazurov began regaining his shape. Whilst at Lovech he spent several loan spells at Dunav Ruse, Pirin Blagoevgrad and Vidima-Rakovski. Overall, he played just 15 times in 3 years. Having failed to break into the Litex first team, Hazurov joined Minyor Pernik on 9 June 2008, where he had difficulty becoming a regular starter, frequently being benched.

=== Bnei Sakhnin ===
On 12 January 2011, Hazurov joined Israeli Premier League side Bnei Sakhnin. His debut came a three days later in a match against Maccabi Tel Aviv, which Bnei Sakhnin lost 3–1. He scored his first goal on 23 January in a 2–1 away win against Maccabi Petah Tikva. Hazurov went on to score four goals for Bnei Sakhnin to the end of the season.

=== Lierse ===
On 22 May 2012, Hazurov signed a two-year contract with Belgian Jupiler Pro League side Lierse S.K.

=== CSKA Sofia ===
He rejoined CSKA Sofia in the summer 2015, quickly establishing himself as a key player and top scorer for the team, managing 36 goals in all competitions.

=== Neftochimic ===
In June 2016, Hazurov became part of newly promoted Neftochimic Burgas' squad.

=== CSKA 1948 ===
On 14 July 2017, Hazurov signed with Third League club CSKA 1948. On 15 August 2017, he decided to leave the club, having made one appearance only.

== International career ==
Between 2004 and 2006 Kostadin Hazurov played in Bulgaria national under-21 football team. In 2004, he played in 1 match in Bulgaria national football team.

== Personal life ==
His cousin, Borislav Hazurov, is also a footballer.

== Honours ==
=== Club ===
CSKA Sofia

- A Group: 2004–05
- Bulgarian Cup: 2015–16
