= Bozhidar Chorbadzhiyski =

Bulgarian footballer

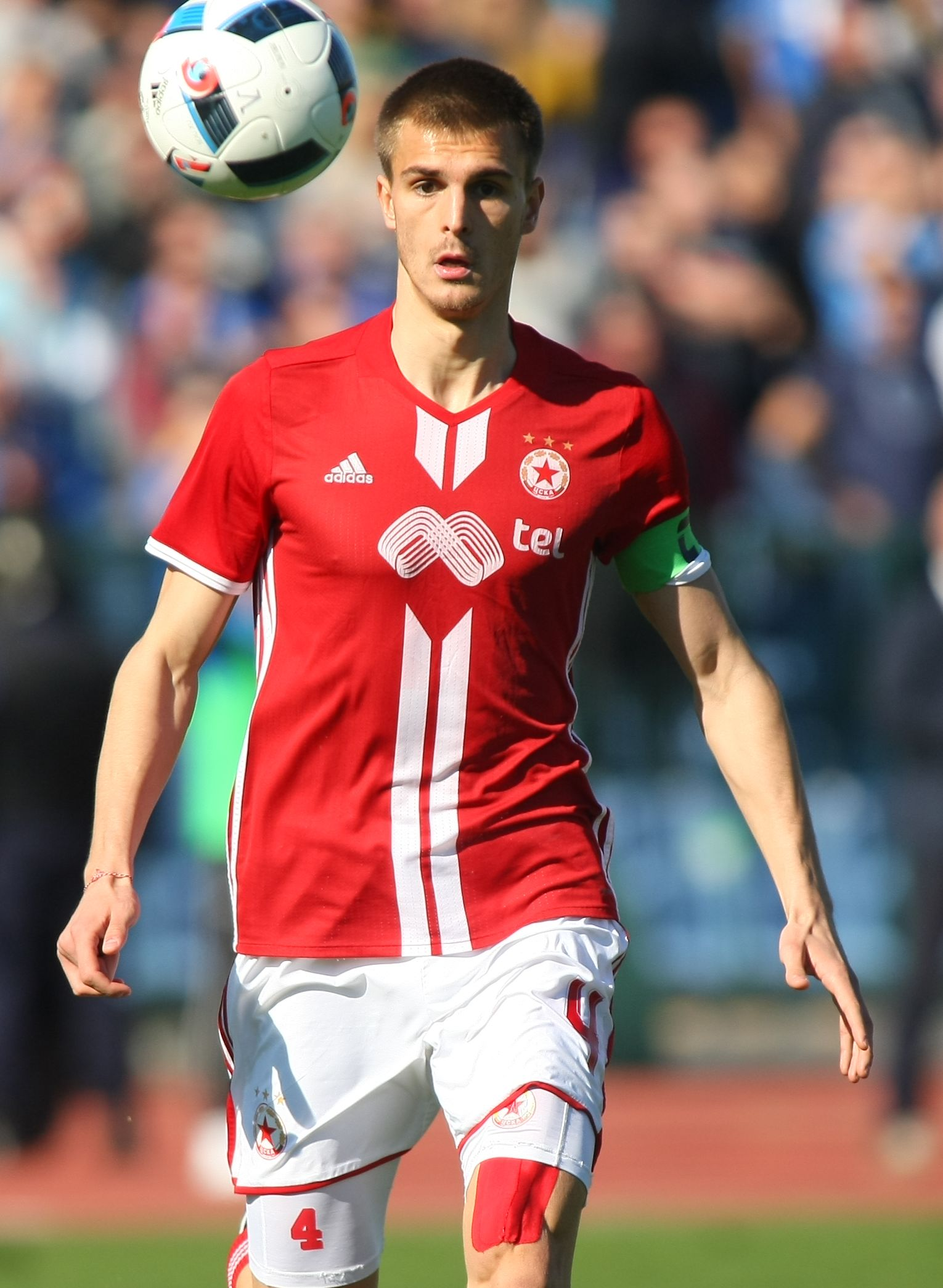

Personal information
- Full name: Bozhidar Brankov Chorbadzhiyski
- Date of birth: 8 August 1995 (age 31)
- Place of birth: Sofia, Bulgaria
- Height: 1.95 m (6 ft 5 in)
- Position: Centre back

Youth career
- 2004–2015: CSKA Sofia

Senior career*
Years	Team	Apps	(Gls)
2013–2020	CSKA Sofia	117	(8)
2019	→ FCSB (loan)	3	(0)
2020–2022	Stal Mielec	42	(1)
2022–2023	Widzew Łódź	11	(0)
2023–2025	Diósgyőr	36	(1)
2025	Botev Vratsa	8	(0)
2026	Hermannstadt	13	(2)

International career^{‡}
2016–2022	Bulgaria	11	(0)
- * Club domestic league appearances and goals as of 24 July 2026 ‡ National team caps and goals as of 12 June 2022

Bozhidar Brankov Chorbadzhiyski (Bulgarian: Божидар Бранков Чорбаджийски; born 8 August 1995) is a Bulgarian professional footballer who plays as a centre back.

== Career ==
=== CSKA Sofia ===
Chorbadzhiyski joined CSKA Sofia as a nine-year-old in 2004 and subsequently progressed through CSKA's academy. On 25 May 2013, he made his competitive debut as a 32nd-minute substitute for Plamen Krachunov in a 2–1 league loss against Lokomotiv Sofia at Lokomotiv Stadium. On 4 April 2014, he signed his first professional contract.

Chorbadzhiyski began to establish himself in the CSKA first team from the 2015–16 season, making 26 league appearances. He scored his first senior goal of his career in a Bulgarian Cup match against Botev Ihtiman on 9 September 2015, which CSKA won 5–0. In that season he also collected his first trophy with the club, winning the 2015–16 Bulgarian Cup.

==== Loan to FCSB ====
On 20 August 2019 Chorbadzhiyski joined Romanian club FCSB on loan until end of the year, with a buyout clause.

=== Stal Mielec ===
On 20 October 2020, Chorbadzhiyski signed with Polish Ekstraklasa side Stal Mielec as a free agent.

=== Widzew Łódź ===
On 24 June 2022, Chorbadzhiyski joined fellow Ekstraklasa club Widzew Łódź, signing a two-year contract. On 16 June 2023 he terminated his contract with the club.

=== Diósgyőr ===
On 16 June 2023, Chorbadzhiyski moved to Hungarian club Diósgyőr.

== International career ==
On 26 May 2016, Chorbadzhiyski received his first call up for Bulgaria for the Kirin Cup, replacing the injured Plamen Galabov. He made his debut for the team on 6 September 2016 in a match against Luxembourg for the 2018 FIFA World Cup qualification, won by Bulgaria by a score of 4–3. His second game for the team was again a qualification match for the 2018 World Cup against the Netherlands on 25 March 2017, won by Bulgaria with 2–0.

== Career statistics ==
=== Club ===
As of match played 1 June 2026

Appearances and goals by club, season and competition
Club	Season	League			National cup (Note: Includes Bulgarian Cup, Cupa României, Polish Cup, Magyar Kupa)		Europe		Other		Total	
Club	Season	Division	Apps	Goals	Apps	Goals	Apps	Goals	Apps	Goals	Apps	Goals
CSKA Sofia	2012–13	A Group	1	0	0	0	0	0	—		1	0
CSKA Sofia	2013–14	A Group	0	0	0	0	—		—		0	0
CSKA Sofia	2014–15	A Group	0	0	0	0	0	0	—		0	0
CSKA Sofia	2015–16	V Group	26	0	9	1	—		—		35	1
CSKA Sofia	2016–17	First League	31	3	1	0	—		—		32	3
CSKA Sofia	2017–18	First League	27	4	3	0	—		—		30	4
CSKA Sofia	2018–19	First League	29	1	3	0	5 (Note: Appearance(s) in UEFA Europa League)	0	—		37	1
CSKA Sofia	2019–20	First League	3	0	0	0	1	0	—		4	0
CSKA Sofia	Total		117	8	16	1	6	0	—		139	9
FCSB (loan)	2019–20	Liga I	3	0	1	0	0	0	—		4	0
Stal Mielec	2020–21	Ekstraklasa	20	0	0	0	—		—		20	0
Stal Mielec	2021–22	Ekstraklasa	22	1	1	0	—		—		23	1
Stal Mielec	Total		42	1	1	0	—		—		43	1
Widzew Łódź	2022–23	Ekstraklasa	11	0	1	0	—		—		12	0
Diósgyőr	2023–24	Nemzeti Bajnokság I	15	0	2	0	—		—		17	0
Diósgyőr	2024–25	Nemzeti Bajnokság I	21	1	0	0	—		—		21	1
Diósgyőr	Total		36	1	2	0	—		—		38	1
Botev Vratsa	2025–26	First League	8	0	1	0	—		—		9	0
Hermannstadt	2025–26	Liga I	13	2	2	0	—		2 (Note: Appearances in Liga I promotion/relegation play-offs)	0	17	2
Career total			230	12	24	1	6	0	2	0	262	13

=== International ===
As of match played 12 June 2022

Appearances and goals by national team and year
National team	Year	Apps	Goals
Bulgaria	2016	1	0
Bulgaria	2017	3	0
Bulgaria	2018	4	0
Bulgaria	2019	1	0
Bulgaria	2020	0	0
Bulgaria	2021	0	0
Bulgaria	2022	2	0
Total		11	0

== Honours ==
CSKA Sofia

- V AFG: 2015–16
- Bulgarian Cup: 2015–16
