= Vasil Popov =

Bulgarian footballer

Personal information
- Full name: Vasil Emilov Popov
- Date of birth: 19 November 1995 (age 30)
- Place of birth: Sofia, Bulgaria
- Height: 1.82 m (5 ft 11 1/2 in)
- Position: Right back

Youth career
- 2002–2014: CSKA Sofia

Senior career*
Years	Team	Apps	(Gls)
2012–2017	CSKA Sofia	8	(0)
2015	→ Etar (loan)		
2016–2017	→ CSKA Sofia II	12	(0)
2017	→ Tsarsko Selo (loan)	4	(0)
2017	Lokomotiv Sofia	10	(0)
2018	Oborishte	7	(0)
2018–2019	Montana	3	(0)
2019–2020	Septemvri Sofia	10	(0)

International career
2012–2014	Bulgaria U19	7	(0)
- * Club domestic league appearances and goals as of 8 December 2021

Vasil Emilov Popov (Bulgarian: Васил Емилов Попов; born 19 November 1995) is a Bulgarian footballer who plays as a right back.

== Club career ==
Born in Sofia, Popov began playing football in 2002, in the youth team of CSKA Sofia. He made his first team debut on 15 December 2012 at 17 years 17 days, in a 5–0 win over Chavdar Etropole for Bulgarian Cup, coming on as a substitute for Ivan Bandalovski. On 10 March 2013, Popov made his league debut, coming on as a first-half substitute during the 2–0 win over Chernomorets Burgas.

On 18 February 2017, Popov was loaned to Tsarsko Selo until the end of the season.

On 29 July 2017, Popov joined Lokomotiv Sofia.

On 2 July 2018, Popov signed a two years contract with Montana, following a successful trial period.

== Honours ==
CSKA Sofia

- Bulgarian Cup: 2015–16
