= Anatoli Gospodinov =

Bulgarian footballer

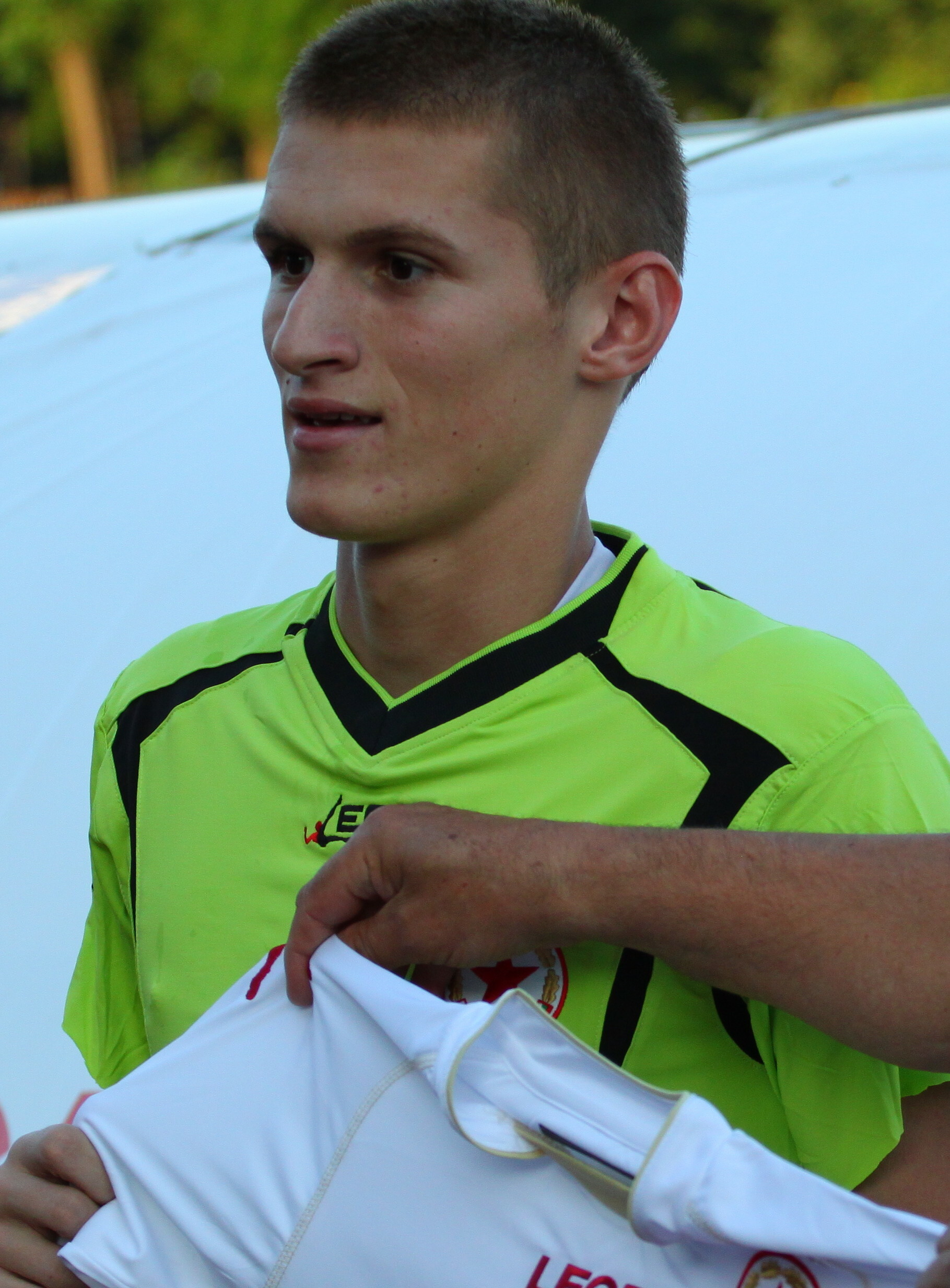

Personal information
- Full name: Anatoli Enchev Gospodinov
- Date of birth: 21 March 1994 (age 32)
- Place of birth: Sliven, Bulgaria
- Height: 1.86 m (6 ft 1 in)
- Position: Goalkeeper

Team information
- Current team: Arda
- Number: 1

Youth career
- Sliven 2000

Senior career*
Years	Team	Apps	(Gls)
2010–2012	Sliven 2000	2	(0)
2012–2016	CSKA Sofia	20	(0)
2013–2014	→ Vitosha Bistritsa (loan)	20	(0)
2016	CSKA Sofia II	5	(0)
2017–2018	Chrobry Głogów	17	(0)
2018–2022	Etar Veliko Tarnovo	43	(0)
2022–	Arda Kardzhali	134	(0)

International career
2010	Bulgaria U17	3	(0)
2012–2013	Bulgaria U19	5	(0)
2014–2016	Bulgaria U21	3	(0)
- * Club domestic league appearances and goals as of 11 June 2026

Anatoli Enchev Gospodinov (Bulgarian: Анатоли Господинов; born 21 March 1994) is a Bulgarian professional footballer who plays as a goalkeeper for First League club Arda Kardzhali, which he captains.

== Career statistics ==
=== Club ===
As of 11 June 2026

Club	Season	Division	League		Cup		Europe		Other		Total	
Club	Season	Division	Apps	Goals	Apps	Goals	Apps	Goals	Apps	Goals	Apps	Goals
Sliven 2000	2010–11	A Group	1	0	0	0	–		–		1	0
Sliven 2000	2011–12	B Group	1	0	0	0	–		–		1	0
Sliven 2000	Total		2	0	0	0	0	0	0	0	2	0
CSKA Sofia	2012–13	A Group	0	0	0	0	0	0	–		0	0
Vitosha Bistritsa (loan)	2013–14	B Group	20	0	1	0	–		–		21	0
CSKA Sofia	2014–15	A Group	6	0	0	0	0	0	–		6	0
CSKA Sofia	2015–16	V Group	14	0	10	0	–		–		24	0
CSKA Sofia	Total		20	0	10	0	0	0	0	0	30	0
CSKA Sofia II	2016–17	Second League	5	0	–		–		–		5	0
Chrobry Głogów	2016–17	I liga	13	0	–		–		–		13	0
Chrobry Głogów	2017–18	I liga	4	0	4	0	–		–		8	0
Chrobry Głogów	Total		17	0	4	0	0	0	0	0	21	0
Etar Veliko Tarnovo	2018–19	First League	2	0	2	0	–		–		4	0
Etar Veliko Tarnovo	2019–20	First League	2	0	1	0	–		1	0	4	0
Etar Veliko Tarnovo	2020–21	First League	10	0	1	0	–		–		11	0
Etar Veliko Tarnovo	2021–22	Second League	29	0	2	0	–		0	0	31	0
Etar Veliko Tarnovo	Total		43	0	6	0	0	0	1	0	50	0
Arda Kardzhali	2022–23	First League	29	0	0	0	–		1	0	30	0
Arda Kardzhali	2023–24	First League	33	0	2	0	–		–		35	0
Arda Kardzhali	2024–25	First League	36	0	2	0	–		1	0	39	0
Arda Kardzhali	2025–26	First League	36	0	4	0	6	0	–		46	0
Arda Kardzhali	Total		134	0	8	0	6	0	2	0	150	0
Career total			241	0	29	0	6	0	3	0	279	0

== Honours ==
CSKA Sofia

- Bulgarian Cup: 2015–16
