= Vladislav Uzunov =

Bulgarian footballer

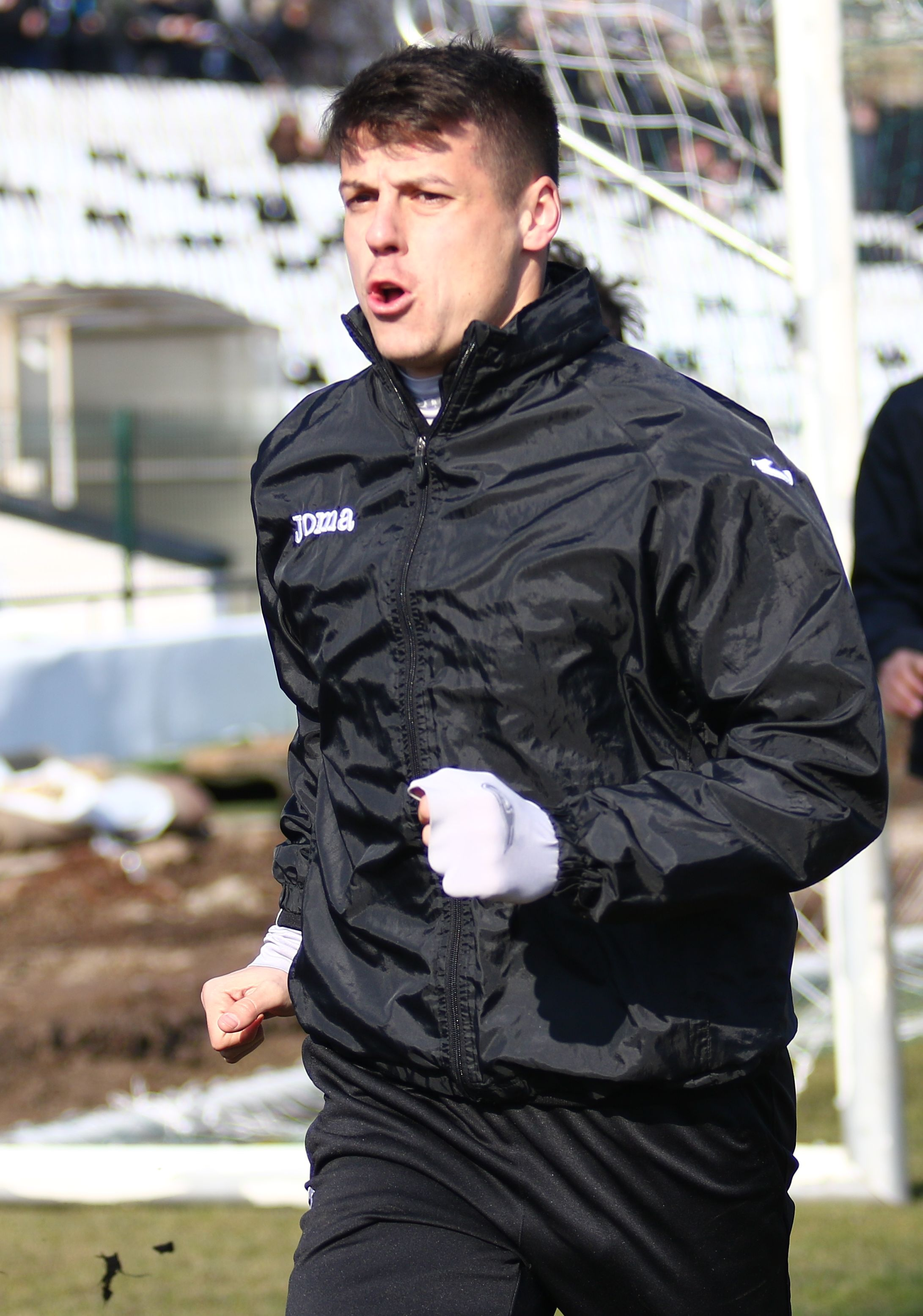

Personal information
- Full name: Vladislav Zdravkov Uzunov
- Date of birth: 25 May 1991 (age 35)
- Place of birth: Madan, Bulgaria
- Height: 1.79 m (5 ft 10 in)
- Position: Midfielder

Team information
- Current team: FC Krumovgrad

Senior career*
Years	Team	Apps	(Gls)
2009	Lokomotiv Mezdra	2	(0)
2010	Sliven 2000	0	(0)
2010–2011	Brestnik 1948	7	(0)
2011–2012	Dimitrovgrad	28	(6)
2012–2013	Kaliakra Kavarna	24	(4)
2013–2015	Haskovo	53	(8)
2015	CSKA Sofia	7	(2)
2016	Dobrudzha Dobrich	11	(1)
2016–2017	Lokomotiv GO	22	(2)
2017–2019	Slavia Sofia	76	(5)
2020	Botev Vratsa	17	(0)
2021	Slavia Sofia	7	(0)
2021–2022	Septemvri Sofia	28	(4)
2022–	FC Krumovgrad	20	(2)
- * Club domestic league appearances and goals as of 5 June 2023

Vladislav Zdravkov Uzunov (Bulgarian: Владислав Здравков Узунов; born 25 May 1991) is a Bulgarian professional footballer who plays as a midfielder for FC Krumovgrad.

== Career ==
On 23 June 2017, Uzunov signed a contract with Slavia Sofia. In July 2022, he joined Krumovgrad.

== Club statistics ==
As of 22 March 2010

Club	Season	League		Cup		Total	
Club	Season	Apps	Goals	Apps	Goals	Apps	Goals
Loko Mezdra	2008–09	0	0	0	0	0	0
Loko Mezdra	2009-10	1	0	1	0	2	0
Sliven	2009-10	0	0	0	0	0	0
Career totals		1	0	1	0	2	0

== Honours ==
Slavia Sofia

- Bulgarian Cup (1): 2017–18
