= Aleksandar Aleksandrov (footballer, born 1994) =

Bulgarian footballer

Personal information
- Full name: Aleksandar Ivov Aleksandrov
- Date of birth: 28 March 1994 (age 32)
- Place of birth: Pernik, Bulgaria
- Height: 1.78 m (5 ft 10 in)
- Position: Winger

Team information
- Current team: Minyor Pernik
- Number: 7

Youth career
- Minyor Pernik

Senior career*
Years	Team	Apps	(Gls)
2012–2013	Minyor Pernik	9	(1)
2013–2014	Slavia Sofia	8	(0)
2014–2015	Minyor Pernik	24	(6)
2015–2016	CSKA Sofia	18	(4)
2016	Neftochimic Burgas	5	(0)
2017–2018	Lokomotiv Sofia	27	(6)
2018	Dunav Ruse	4	(0)
2019–2023	Lokomotiv Sofia	88	(19)
2023–	Minyor Pernik	69	(13)
- * Club domestic league appearances and goals as of 11 June 2026

Aleksandar Ivov Aleksandrov (Bulgarian: Александър Александров; born 28 March 1994) is a Bulgarian footballer who plays as a midfielder for Minyor Pernik.

== International career ==
On 21 May 2013, Aleksandrov was called up to the Under-21 squad by manager Mihail Madanski for the European Championship qualifying games against Andorra on 1 and 5 June.

On 11 December 2018 Lokomotiv Sofia announced that Aleksandrov had returned to the club for the second time.

== Honours ==
=== Club ===
CSKA Sofia

- Bulgarian Cup: 2015–16
