= Viktor Raychev =

Bulgarian footballer

Personal information
- Full name: Viktor Miroslavov Raychev
- Date of birth: 26 May 1986 (age 40)
- Place of birth: Pernik, Bulgaria
- Position: Defender

Senior career*
Years	Team	Apps	(Gls)
2008–2010	Minyor Bobov Dol		
2010–2011	Vitosha Dolna Dikanya		
2011–2012	Marek Dupnitsa		
2012–2015	Minyor Pernik	62	(0)
2015–2016	CSKA Sofia	18	(1)
2017	Tsarsko Selo	6	(0)
2017	Lokomotiv Sofia	7	(0)
2018–2022	Minyor Pernik	100	(2)
- * Club domestic league appearances and goals

Viktor Raychev (Bulgarian: Виктор Райчев; born 26 May 1986) is a Bulgarian retired footballer who played as a defender.

== Career ==
On 4 December 2017, Raychev joined Third League side Minyor Pernik.
