= Ivo Ivanov (footballer, born April 1985) =

Bulgarian footballer

Personal information
- Full name: Ivo Krasimirov Ivanov
- Date of birth: 30 April 1985 (age 41)
- Place of birth: Pleven, Bulgaria
- Height: 1.86 m (6 ft 1 in)
- Position: Central midfielder

Senior career*
Years	Team	Apps	(Gls)
2003–2006	Spartak Pleven	44	(7)
2006–2012	Lokomotiv Sofia	76	(3)
2012–2013	Spartak Pleven	18	(1)
2013	Lyubimets 2007	5	(0)
2014–2015	Lokomotiv Sofia	36	(2)
2015	CSKA Sofia	5	(1)
2016	Spartak Pleven	16	(1)
2017	Septemvri Sofia	7	(1)
2017–2018	Lokomotiv Sofia	28	(3)
2018	Minyor Pernik	12	(3)

International career
2006	Bulgaria U21	4	(0)
- * Club domestic league appearances and goals as of 1 January 2019

Ivo Krasimirov Ivanov (Bulgarian: Иво Красимиров Иванов; born 30 April 1985) is a Bulgarian footballer who plays as a midfielder.

== Career ==
In July 2017, Ivanov returned to Lokomotiv Sofia.

On 2 July 2018, Ivanov joined Minyor Pernik.
