= Stadion Minyor =

- The Stadium of Peace
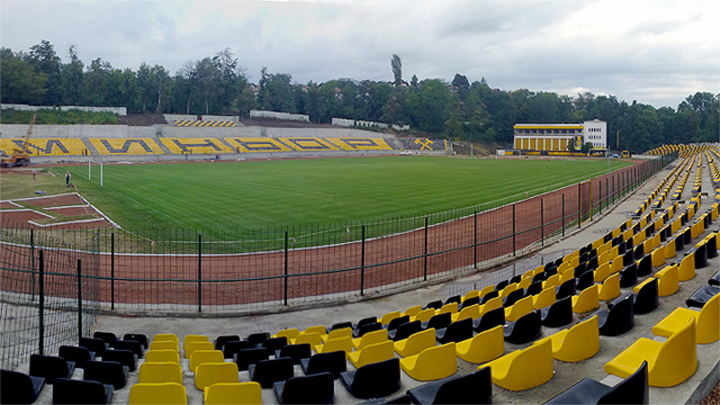
- Interactive map of Stadion Minyor
- Full name: Stadion Minyor
- Former names: Stadion Georgi Dimitrov
- Location: Pernik, Bulgaria
- Coordinates: 42°36′24″N 23°1′24″E
- Owner: Municipality of Pernik
- Operator: Minyor Pernik
- Capacity: 8,000
- Surface: Grass
- Field size: 105 X 60

Construction
- Groundbreaking: 1951
- Built: 1951–1954
- Opened: 30 May 1954
- Renovated: 2009

Tenant
- Minyor Pernik (1954-present)

Stadion Minyor (Bulgarian: Стадион „Миньор“, English: 'Minyor Stadium', lit. ''Miner Stadium''), nicknamed The Stadium of Peace is a multi-purpose stadium in Pernik, Bulgaria. It is used for football matches and is the home ground of the local football club Minyor Pernik. The stadium has a capacity of 8,000 spectators. It was officially inaugurated on 30 May 1954.

The stadium initially held a capacity of 20,000 spectators, but in August 2009, the owners of the club decided to rebuild the whole western stand, and the capacity was reduced to 8,000 spectators to obtain a license from the Bulgarian Football Union.
