= Tihomir Kanev =

Bulgarian footballer

Personal information
- Full name: Tihomir Krasimirov Kanev
- Date of birth: 3 January 1986 (age 40)
- Place of birth: Veliko Tarnovo, Bulgaria
- Height: 1.82 m (6 ft 0 in)
- Position: Forward

Team information
- Current team: FC "Chernolomets 1919" Popovo
- Number: 10

Senior career*
Years	Team	Apps	(Gls)
2006–2007	Chernolomets	20	(27)
2007–2009	Svetkavitsa	46	(13)
2010–2011	Etar 1924	37	(14)
2011–2012	Svetkavitsa	34	(1)
2013–2014	Lokomotiv GO	41	(56)
2014	Sozopol	4	(1)
2015	Etar	11	(6)
2015–2016	Lokomotiv GO	33	(14)
2017	Etar	8	(2)
2017	Litex Lovech	10	(0)
2018	Sevlievo	13	(9)
2018	Lokomotiv GO	15	(5)
2019	Kronos Argyrades	–	(–)
2019	Pomorie	10	(3)
2020–	Sevlievo	0	(0)
- * Club domestic league appearances and goals as of 15 December 2019

Tihomir Kanev (Bulgarian: Тихомир Кънев; born 3 January 1986) is a Bulgarian footballer who plays as a forward for FC "Chernolomets 1919" Popovo.

== Career ==
Kanev returned to Etar in January 2017, but was released at the end of the season. On 15 July 2017, he joined Third League club Sevlievo but actually signed with Litex Lovech a week later.

In June 2018, Kanev returned to Lokomotiv Gorna Oryahovitsa.
