= Kiril Dinchev =

Bulgarian footballer

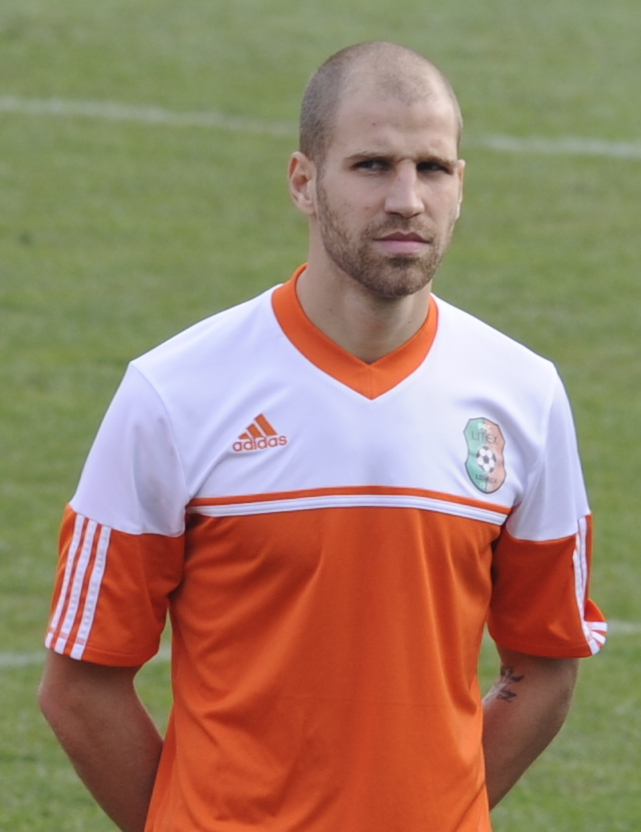

Personal information
- Full name: Kiril Tonev Dinchev
- Date of birth: 8 May 1989 (age 37)
- Place of birth: Sofia, Bulgaria
- Height: 1.80 m (5 ft 11 in)
- Position: Right back

Team information
- Current team: Slavia Sofia (fitness coach)

Youth career
- Slavia Sofia

Senior career*
Years	Team	Apps	(Gls)
2008–2011	Akademik Sofia	60	(1)
2011	Botev Vratsa	8	(0)
2012–2013	Litex Lovech	6	(0)
2014	Pelister	17	(0)
2015	Apollon Arnaia	13	(0)
2015–2016	CSKA Sofia	21	(0)
Total		125	(1)

Managerial career
- 2016–2022: CSKA Sofia (fitness coach)
- 2022–2024: CSKA Sofia II (fitness coach)
- 2024: CSKA Sofia (fitness coach)
- 2024–: Slavia Sofia (fitness coach)
- * Club domestic league appearances and goals

Kiril Dinchev (Bulgarian: Кирил Динчев; born 8 May 1989 in Sofia) is a former Bulgarian footballer who played as a defender. He retired in 2016, at the age of 27.

== Honours ==
=== Club ===
CSKA Sofia

- Bulgarian Cup: 2015–16

== Career statistics ==
Club	Season	Division	League		Cup		Europe		Total	
Club	Season	Division	Apps	Goals	Apps	Goals	Apps	Goals	Apps	Goals
Akademik Sofia	2009–10	B Group	21	1	0	0	–		21	1
Akademik Sofia	2010–11	A Group	22	0	0	0	–		22	0
Akademik Sofia	Total		43	1	0	0	0	0	43	1
Botev Vratsa	2011–12	A Group	8	0	0	0	–		8	0
Botev Vratsa	Total		8	0	0	0	0	0	8	0
Litex Lovech	2011–12	A Group	1	0	0	0	–		1	0
Litex Lovech	2012–13	A Group	5	0	0	0	–		5	0
Litex Lovech	2013–14	A Group	0	0	4	0	0	0	4	0
Litex Lovech	Total		6	0	4	0	0	0	10	0
Pelister	2013–14	Prva Liga	2	0	0	0	–		2	0
Pelister	2014–15	Prva Liga	11	0	0	0	–		11	0
Pelister	Total		13	0	0	0	0	0	13	0
Apollon Arnaia	2014–2015	Gamma Ethniki	13	0	0	0	–		13	0
Apollon Arnaia	Total		13	0	0	0	0	0	13	0
CSKA Sofia	2015–16	V Group	22	0	9	1	–		31	1
CSKA Sofia	Total		22	0	9	1	0	0	31	1
Career Total			92	1	13	1	0	0	105	2
