= Stanislav Malamov =

Bulgarian footballer

Personal information
- Full name: Stanislav Aleksandrov Malamov
- Date of birth: 21 September 1989 (age 37)
- Place of birth: Stamboliyski, Bulgaria
- Height: 1.82 m (6 ft 0 in)
- Position: Winger

Team information
- Current team: Krumovgrad
- Number: 12

Youth career
- 1996–2002: Trakia Stamboliyski
- 2002–2008: Maritsa Plovdiv

Senior career*
Years	Team	Apps	(Gls)
2008–2010	Maritsa Plovdiv	23	(1)
2010	Nesebar	10	(1)
2011	Rakovski		
2012–2014	Lokomotiv Plovdiv	55	(2)
2015	Haskovo	8	(0)
2015–2016	CSKA Sofia	16	(2)
2016	Neftochimic Burgas	8	(1)
2018	Septemvri Sofia	3	(0)
2018–2019	Vereya	18	(2)
2020	Vitosha Bistritsa	4	(0)
2021–2024	Maritsa Plovdiv	99	(21)
2024–2025	Chernomorets Burgas	37	(13)
2025–2026	Hebar	25	(2)
2026–	Krumovgrad	10	(3)
- * Club domestic league appearances and goals as of 30 October 2026

Stanislav Aleksandrov Malamov (Bulgarian: Станислав Маламов; born 21 September 1989) is a Bulgarian professional footballer who plays as a winger for Krumovgrad.

== Career ==
Born in Stamboliyski, Malamov began his football career at the age of 7, playing for hometown club FC Trakia. He spent a six years at the club before moving to Maritsa Plovdiv in 2002 at the age of 13. In the summer of 2008, Malamov was included in the Maritsa first-team squad.

On 12 December 2011, Malamov joined Lokomotiv Plovdiv. He made his A PFG debut in a 2–0 win over Chernomorets Burgas on 10 March 2012, coming on as a substitute for Dakson. On 24 May 2016, he scored the winning goal for CSKA Sofia in the 2016 Bulgarian Cup Final. In December 2017, Malamov was confirmed as a new signing of Septemvri Sofia.

== Honours ==
CSKA Sofia

- Bulgarian Cup: 2015–16
