= Iliyan Trifonov =

Bulgarian footballer

Personal information
- Full name: Iliyan Ivanov Trifonov
- Date of birth: 30 September 1984 (age 42)
- Place of birth: Veliko Tarnovo, Bulgaria
- Height: 1.81 m (5 ft 11 1/2 in)
- Position: Midfielder

Senior career*
Years	Team	Apps	(Gls)
2002–2005	Etar 1924	55	(7)
2005–2006	Slavia Sofia	16	(2)
2006–2007	Etar 1924	29	(1)
2008–2010	Vidima-Rakovski	61	(1)
2010–2011	Etar 1924	28	(1)
2011–2013	Lyubimets 2007	42	(5)
2013–2017	SFC Etar	68	(11)
- * Club domestic league appearances and goals as of 29 May 2017

Iliyan Trifonov (Bulgarian: Илиян Трифонов; born 30 September 1984) is a Bulgarian footballer who plays as a midfielder.

== Career ==
Trifonov started his football career with Etar 1924 before moving to Slavia Sofia in the year 2005. He made his A PFG debut for the Sofia-based club in August 2005, but did not become a regular to the end of the season and returned to Etar.
