= Preslav Yordanov =

Bulgarian footballer

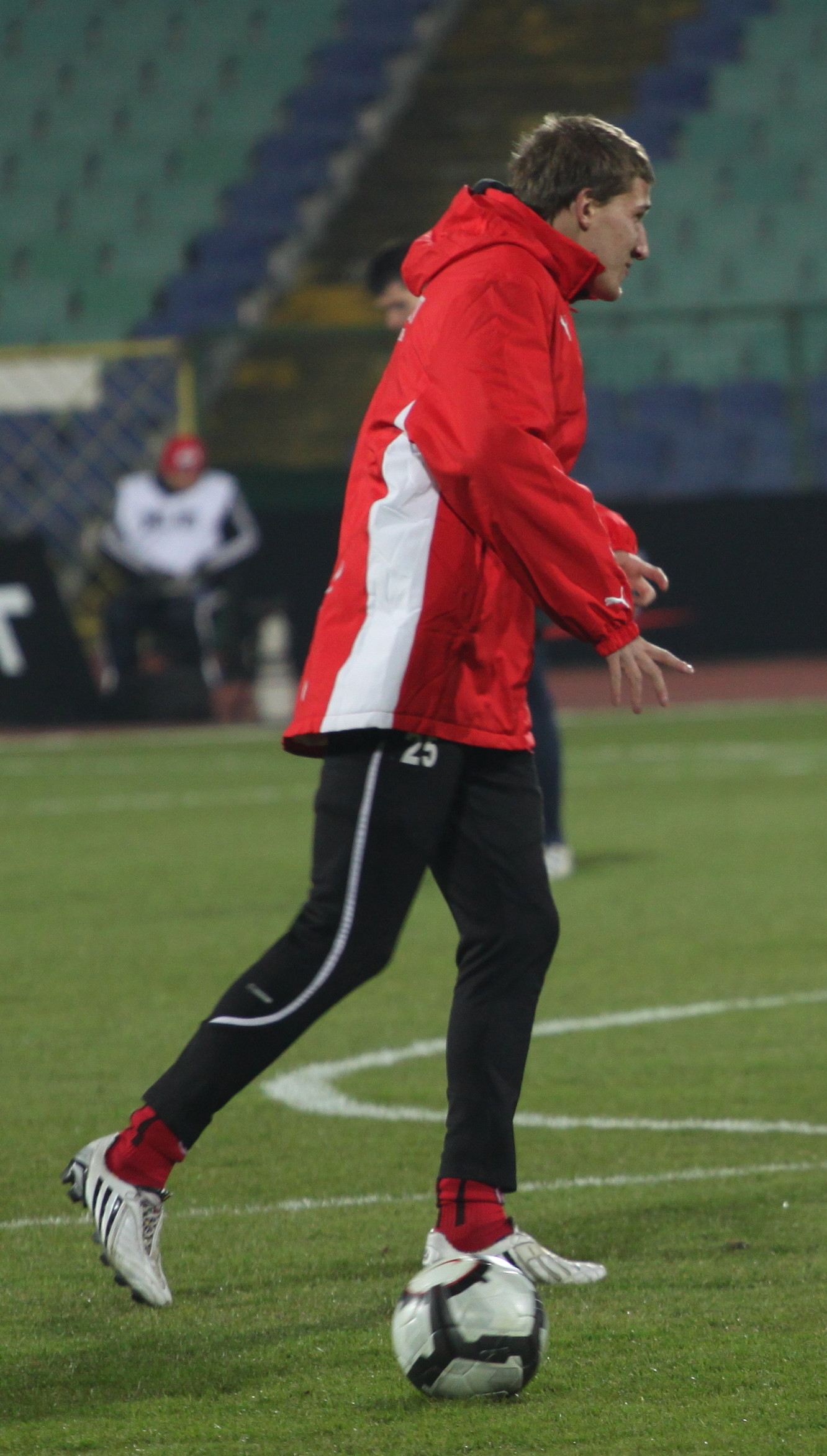
- Yordanov with Lokomotiv Sofia in 2011

Personal information
- Full name: Preslav Anatoliev Yordanov
- Date of birth: 21 July 1989 (age 37)
- Place of birth: Pleven, Bulgaria
- Height: 1.92 m (6 ft 4 in)
- Position: Forward

Team information
- Current team: Vihren Sandanski
- Number: 29

Youth career
- –2006: Spartak Pleven

Senior career*
Years	Team	Apps	(Gls)
2006–2007	Spartak Pleven	17	(3)
2007–2011	Lokomotiv Sofia	41	(10)
2008	→ Spartak Pleven (loan)	11	(7)
2009	→ Belasitsa Petrich (loan)	10	(3)
2012–2014	Chernomorets Burgas	42	(4)
2014–2015	Lokomotiv Sofia	12	(3)
2015–2016	CSKA Sofia	28	(26)
2017	Ordabasy	17	(4)
2018	Pirin Blagoevgrad	8	(1)
2019–2020	Septemvri Sofia	17	(13)
2020–2023	Pirin Blagoevgrad	79	(23)
2023–2024	Dobrudzha	33	(14)
2024–2025	Etar Veliko Tarnovo	13	(6)
2025–2026	Minyor Pernik	28	(11)
2026–	Vihren Sandanski	0	(0)

International career
2016	Bulgaria	1	(0)
- * Club domestic league appearances and goals as of 11 June 2026

Preslav Anatoliev Yordanov (Bulgarian: Преслав Анатолиев Йорданов; born 21 July 1989) is a Bulgarian professional footballer who plays as a forward for Vihren Sandanski.

== Club career ==
=== Spartak Pleven ===
Born in Pleven, Yordanov started his career as a forward for Spartak Pleven during the 2006–07 season. He made his professional debut on 23 September 2006 in the West B PFG match against Hebar Pazardzhik at the age of 17.

=== Lokomotiv Sofia ===
In May 2007, Yordanov was confirmed to have signed a deal with A PFG side Lokomotiv Sofia, but for the 2007–08 season he was loaned out to Lokomotiv Mezdra and Spartak Pleven. On 5 March 2008, he scored his first hat-trick in his career, scoring four in a 5–3 win over Akademik Sofia.

Yordanov returned to Lokomotiv Sofia for the 2008–09 season, playing for the reserves. On 23 January 2009, Belasitsa Petrich confirmed Preslav has joined on loan until the end of the season. He earned 10 appearances playing in the A PFG, scoring three goals.

Yordanov made his competitive debut for Lokomotiv Sofia during the 2009–10 season, on 14 August 2009, in a 3–2 home win over Sportist Svoge, coming on as a substitute for Kristian Dobrev. He scored his first goal a year later, on 9 August 2010, in a 3–1 away loss against Levski Sofia.

On 21 July 2011, Yordanov scored his first ever European goals, netting twice in a 3–2 home win over Metalurg Skopje in the second qualifying round of 2011–12 Europa League and helped his team advance to the next stage. He left the club in December due to financial problems.

=== Chernomorets Burgas ===
On 4 December 2011, it was announced that Preslav Yordanov had signed with Chernomorets Burgas and will join his new club in January 2012. Yordanov impressed during Chernomorets' preseason campaign, netting 9 goals in 11 friendly matches. He debuted in a 2–0 home win against CSKA Sofia on 4 March 2012, playing the full 90 minutes. Yordanov scored for the first time in an official match on 21 March 2012, netting a last-minute goal in an away A PFG match against Kaliakra Kavarna to seal a 4–0 win.

On 13 December 2012, he was arrested for match-fixing. Yordanov was subsequently released without any charges pressed against him.

=== CSKA Sofia ===
Yordanov joined CSKA Sofia in the summer 2015, quickly establishing himself as an influential player for the team, being the club's second highest goalscorer in all competitions, finding the net on 33 occasions.

=== Ordabasy ===
On 15 February 2017, CSKA Sofia sold Yordanov to Kazakh club Ordabasy for an undisclosed fee.

=== Pirin Blagoevgrad ===
Yordanov returned to Bulgaria in March 2018, joining Pirin Blagoevgrad.

=== Septemvri Sofia ===
He was part of the Septemvri Sofia team between December 2018 and May 2020.

=== Pirin Blagoevgrad (2nd stint) ===
Yordanov rejoined Pirin Blagoevgrad in May 2020, signing a two-year contract.

== International career ==
Yordanov has been capped for various Bulgaria youth teams. He was called up to the senior Bulgaria squad by Ivaylo Petev for a 2018 FIFA World Cup qualifier against Luxembourg in September 2016, but had to withdraw due to sustaining an injury. On 13 November 2016, Yordanov earned his first cap for Bulgaria under new manager Petar Houbchev, coming on as a second-half substitute for Ivelin Popov in the 1–0 win over Belarus in a 2018 World Cup qualifier.

== Career statistics ==
As of 7 November 2025

Appearances and goals by club, season and competition
Club	Season	League			Cup		Europe		Total	
Club	Season	Division	Apps	Goals	Apps	Goals	Apps	Goals	Apps	Goals
Spartak Pleven	2006–07	B Group	17	3	0	0	–		17	3
Lokomotiv Mezdra	2007–08	B Group	5	0	0	0	–		5	0
Lokomotiv Sofia	2008–09	A Group	0	0	0	0	0	0	0	0
Lokomotiv Sofia	2009–10	A Group	8	0	1	0	–		9	0
Lokomotiv Sofia	2010–11	A Group	19	5	1	0	–		20	5
Lokomotiv Sofia	2011–12	A Group	14	5	1	0	2	2	17	7
Spartak Pleven (loan)	2007–08	B Group	11	7	0	0	–		11	7
Belasitsa Petrich (loan)	2008–09	A Group	10	3	1	1	–		11	4
Chernomorets Burgas	2011–12	A Group	12	2	0	0	0	0	12	2
Chernomorets Burgas	2012–13	A Group	23	2	0	0	–		23	2
Chernomorets Burgas	2013–14	A Group	5	0	0	0	–		5	0
Lokomotiv Sofia	2014–15	A Group	12	3	4	0	–		16	4
CSKA Sofia	2015–16	V Group	17	23	9	10	–		26	33
CSKA Sofia	2016–17	First League	11	3	0	0	–		11	3
CSKA Sofia	Total		28	26	9	10	0	0	37	36
Ordabasy	2017	Kazakhstan Premier League	17	4	1	0	0	19	5	
Pirin Blagoevgrad	2017–18	First League	8	1	0	0	–		8	1
Septemvri Sofia	2019–20	Second League	17	13	0	0	–		17	13
Pirin Blagoevgrad	2020–21	Second League	27	15	1	3	–		28	18
Pirin Blagoevgrad	2021–22	First League	28	4	2	2	–		30	6
Pirin Blagoevgrad	2022–23	First League	24	4	1	0	–		25	4
Pirin Blagoevgrad	Total		79	23	4	5	0	0	83	28
Dobrudzha	2023–24	Second League	33	14	0	0	–		33	14
Etar Veliko Tarnovo	2024–25	Second League	13	6	0	0	–		13	6
Minyor Pernik	2025–26	Second League	14	7	1	0	–		15	7
Career total			255	124	23	16	3	2	371	144

== Honours ==
CSKA Sofia

- Bulgarian Cup: 2015–16

== External sources ==
- Preslav Yordanov at Soccerway
