= Yordan Yordanov (footballer, born 1992) =

Bulgarian footballer

Personal information
- Full name: Yordan Kanchev Yordanov
- Date of birth: 20 April 1992 (age 34)
- Place of birth: Pernik, Bulgaria
- Height: 1.90 m (6 ft 3 in)
- Position: Midfielder

Team information
- Current team: Minyor Pernik
- Number: 23

Youth career
- Minyor Pernik

Senior career*
Years	Team	Apps	(Gls)
2010–2015	Minyor Pernik	67	(11)
2015–2016	CSKA Sofia	28	(7)
2016–2017	Neftochimic	22	(0)
2017–2023	Montana	161	(17)
2023–2024	Septemvri Sofia	32	(2)
2024–	Minyor Pernik	60	(0)
- * Club domestic league appearances and goals as of 11 June 2026

Yordan Kanchev Yordanov (Bulgarian: Йордан Кънчев Йорданов; born 20 April 1992) is a Bulgarian footballer who plays for Minyor Pernik as a midfielder.

He made his A Group debut for Minyor Pernik on 28 May 2011 in a 3–0 away win over Sliven 2000, coming on as a second-half substitute. On 30 June 2017, he signed a 1-year contract with Montana. In June 2023, Yordanov joined Septemvri Sofia.

== Career statistics ==
As of 3 May 2016

Club	Season	Division	League		Cup		Europe		Total	
Club	Season	Division	Apps	Goals	Apps	Goals	Apps	Goals	Apps	Goals
Minyor Pernik	2010–11	A Group	1	0	0	0	—		1	0
Minyor Pernik	2011–12	A Group	1	0	0	0	—		1	0
Minyor Pernik	2012–13	A Group	16	0	2	0	—		18	0
Minyor Pernik	2013–14	V Group	23	4	0	0	—		23	4
Minyor Pernik	2014–15	V Group	26	7	0	0	—		26	7
Minyor Pernik	Total		67	11	2	0	0	0	69	11
CSKA Sofia	2015–16	V Group	28	7	8	0	—		36	7
CSKA Sofia	Total		28	7	8	0	0	0	36	7
Career total			95	18	10	0	0	0	105	18

== Honours ==
CSKA Sofia

- Bulgarian Cup: 2015–16
