= Boris Galchev =

Bulgarian footballer

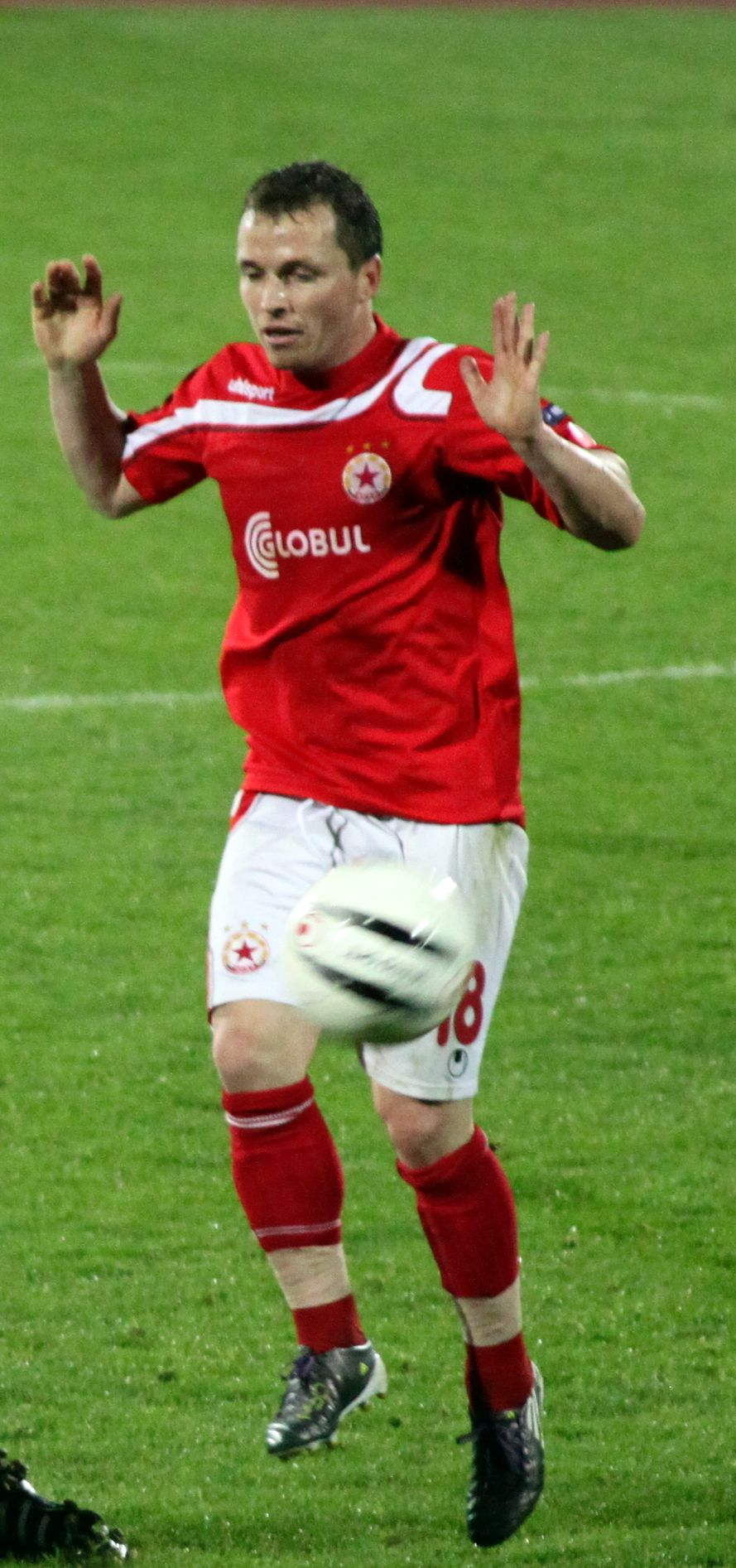
- Galchev with CSKA Sofia in 2010

Personal information
- Full name: Boris Petrov Galchev
- Date of birth: 31 October 1983 (age 43)
- Place of birth: Razlog, Bulgaria
- Height: 1.73 m (5 ft 8 in)
- Position: Defensive midfielder

Team information
- Current team: Bansko Team (manager)

Senior career*
Years	Team	Apps	(Gls)
2003–2007	Pirin Razlog	?	(?)
2008–2009	Pirin Blagoevgrad	27	(2)
2010–2012	CSKA Sofia	60	(3)
2012	Dinamo București	4	(0)
2013	Botev Plovdiv	30	(2)
2014–2016	CSKA Sofia	59	(18)
2017–2020	Septemvri Sofia	89	(19)
2020	Tsarsko Selo	12	(0)
2021	Minyor Pernik	12	(2)
2021–2023	Bansko Team	46	(8)
Total		339+	(54+)

International career
2012	Bulgaria	1	(0)

Managerial career
- 2021–2023: Bansko Team (player-manager)
- 2023–: Bansko Team
- * Club domestic league appearances and goals as of 12:33, 18 May 2022 (UTC)

Boris Petrov Galchev (Bulgarian: Борис Галчев; born 31 October 1983) is a Bulgarian retired professional footballer who played as a midfielder and now manager, currently working as the manager of Bansko Team.

== Career ==
=== Early career ===
Born in Razlog, but raised in Dobrinishte, Galchev started his career in the youth system of Pirin Blagoevgrad. Then he was released by Pirin after failing to progress into their first team and joined amateur side Pirin Razlog. In this period, along with his football career, he also worked as a lumberman.

=== Pirin Blagoevgrad ===
In 2007, Galchev returned to Pirin Blagoevgrad and helped the team gain promotion to the B Group. In December 2008, Pirin merged with the other club of Blagoevgrad, which in season 2008–09 was a part of A Group. Galchev was selected to join unions club.

He quickly became part of the main team and until the end of 2008–09 season earned 15 appearances playing in the A PFG, scoring one goal.

On 7 August 2009, Galchev was announced as Pirin's new club captain.

=== CSKA Sofia ===
On 12 January 2010, CSKA Sofia signed Galchev to a three-and-a-half-year deal. He was given the number 18 shirt. On 27 March 2010, he played in his first Eternal Derby against Levski Sofia after coming on as a substitute during the second half of the game. He established himself as a key player in the midfield for CSKA. For the Reds Galchev appeared in 60 games, scoring three goals.

=== Dinamo București ===
On 13 July 2012, Galchev signed with Romanian Liga I side Dinamo București for two years with an option for a year extension. As part of the deal, former CSKA Sofia striker Michel Platini returned to his previous club.

=== Botev Plovdiv ===
In early January 2013, Galchev returned to Bulgaria and signed a contract with Botev Plovdiv. On 3 January 2014 his contract was terminated by mutual agreement.

=== Return to CSKA ===
In January 2014, Galchev rejoined CSKA Sofia, with the expectation of improved financial parameters for the next season. During the 2014–15 A PFG season he has mostly seen action as a substitute. On 25 October 2014, he scored the third goal for his team in the 3–0 win over Levski Sofia in the Eternal Derby. He was released in January 2017.

=== Septemvri Sofia ===
In January 2017, Galchev signed with Septemvri Sofia for two and a half years.

Galchev scored the winning goal for the first victory of Septemvri in First League for the season on 22 July 2017 in match against Pirin Blagoevgrad.

== International career ==
Galchev earned his first call-up to the Bulgaria national side in March 2011 for the Euro 2012 qualifier against Switzerland and the friendly match versus Cyprus, but was not selected to play in any of these games. He was also called up for the friendly against Hungary in February 2012, but did not feature in the match. Galchev made his debut on 29 May 2012, after coming on as a substitute in a 2–0 loss against Turkey in an exhibition game.

He has also played for Bulgaria at the amateur level.

== Career statistics ==
=== Club ===
As of 24 December 2020

Club performance			League		Cup		Continental		Other		Total	
Club	Season	Division	Apps	Goals	Apps	Goals	Apps	Goals	Apps	Goals	Apps	Goals
Pirin Blagoevgrad	2008–09	A Group	12	1	3	0	–		–		15	1
Pirin Blagoevgrad	2009–10	A Group	15	1	1	0	–		–		16	1
Pirin Blagoevgrad	Total		27	2	4	0	0	0	0	0	31	2
CSKA Sofia	2009–10	A Group	9	0	1	0	0	0	–		10	0
CSKA Sofia	2010–11	A Group	22	1	4	0	8	0	–		34	1
CSKA Sofia	2011–12	A Group	29	2	2	1	2	0	1	0	34	3
CSKA Sofia	Total		60	3	7	1	10	0	1	0	78	4
Dinamo București	2012–13	Liga I	4	0	1	0	2	0	–		7	0
Dinamo București	Total		4	0	1	0	2	0	0	0	7	0
Botev Plovdiv	2012–13	A Group	13	1	0	0	–		–		13	1
Botev Plovdiv	2013–14	A Group	17	1	1	0	6	0	–		24	1
Botev Plovdiv	Total		30	2	1	0	6	0	0	0	37	2
CSKA Sofia	2013–14	A Group	5	0	0	0	–		–		5	0
CSKA Sofia	2014–15	A Group	24	2	0	0	2	0	–		26	2
CSKA Sofia	2015–16	V Group	22	16	8	2	–		–		30	18
CSKA Sofia	2016–17	First League	8	0	0	0	–		–		8	0
CSKA Sofia	Total		59	18	8	2	2	0	0	0	69	20
Septemvri Sofia	2016–17	Second League	12	3	0	0	–		1	1	13	4
Septemvri Sofia	2017–18	First League	32	7	1	1	–		–		33	8
Septemvri Sofia	2018–19	First League	29	4	4	1	–		3	1	36	6
Septemvri Sofia	2019–20	Second League	16	5	2	1	–		1	0	19	6
Septemvri Sofia	Total		89	19	7	3	0	0	5	2	101	24
Tsarsko Selo	2020–21	First League	12	0	1	0	–		–		13	0
Career Total			281	44	29	6	20	0	6	2	336	52

== Honours ==
=== Club ===
CSKA Sofia

- Bulgarian Cup (2): 2010–11, 2015–16
