= Sergey Georgiev =

Bulgarian footballer

Personal information
- Full name: Sergey Sergeev Georgiev
- Date of birth: 15 May 1992 (age 34)
- Place of birth: Sofia, Bulgaria
- Height: 1.76 m (5 ft 9 1/2 in)
- Position: Winger

Team information
- Current team: Lokomotiv Mezdra
- Number: 99

Youth career
- 1999–2000: Levski Sofia
- 2000–2009: Elit Sofia
- 2009–2011: Canillas

Senior career*
Years	Team	Apps	(Gls)
2012–2014	Bansko	45	(9)
2014–2019	Montana	135	(21)
2019	Tsarsko Selo	3	(0)
2019–2022	Montana	45	(5)
2022–2023	Dunav Lom	?	(?)
2023–	Lokomotiv Mezdra	?	(?)
- * Club domestic league appearances and goals as of 1 June 2026

Sergey Georgiev (Bulgarian: Сергей Георгиев; born 15 May 1992) is a Bulgarian professional footballer who plays as a winger for Lokomotiv Mezdra.

== Career ==
=== Youth career ===
Georgiev began his football career with Levski Sofia, but joined Elit Sofia as an 8-year-old in 2000. He left Elit for Spanish side CD Canillas at the age of 17 in 2009.

=== PFC Bansko ===
On 23 March 2012 Sergey joined the Bulgarian B Group side team Bansko.

=== PFC Montana ===
In June 2014 Georgiev moved from Bansko to the other B Group team PFC Montana. On 25 September 2014, he scored the winning goal during extra time in PFC Montana's surprising 2:1 victory over CSKA Sofia in the 1/16 finals of the Bulgarian Cup. On 4 June 2016 he scored a goal and assisted for another one in 2–1 win against OFC Pomorie in the Relegation play-off.

== Career statistics ==
=== Club ===
As of 5 February 2017

Club performance			League		Cup		Continental		Other		Total	
Club	League	Season	Apps	Goals	Apps	Goals	Apps	Goals	Apps	Goals	Apps	Goals
Bulgaria			League		Bulgarian Cup		Europe		Other (Note: Includes Bulgarian Supercup and Relegation play-offs matches.)		Total	
Bansko	B Group	2011–12	7	0	0	0	–		–		7	0
Bansko	B Group	2012–13	12	2	2	1	–		–		14	3
Bansko	B Group	2013–14	26	7	0	0	–		–		26	7
Bansko	Total		45	9	2	1	0	0	0	0	47	10
Montana	B Group	2014–15	27	9	3	2	–		–		30	11
Montana	А Group	2015–16	26	2	6	3	–		1	1	33	6
Montana	First League	2016–17	17	1	0	0	–		–		17	1
Montana	Total		70	12	9	5	0	0	1	1	80	18
Career statistics			115	21	11	6	0	0	1	1	127	28
