= Nikolay Tsvetkov =

Bulgarian footballer

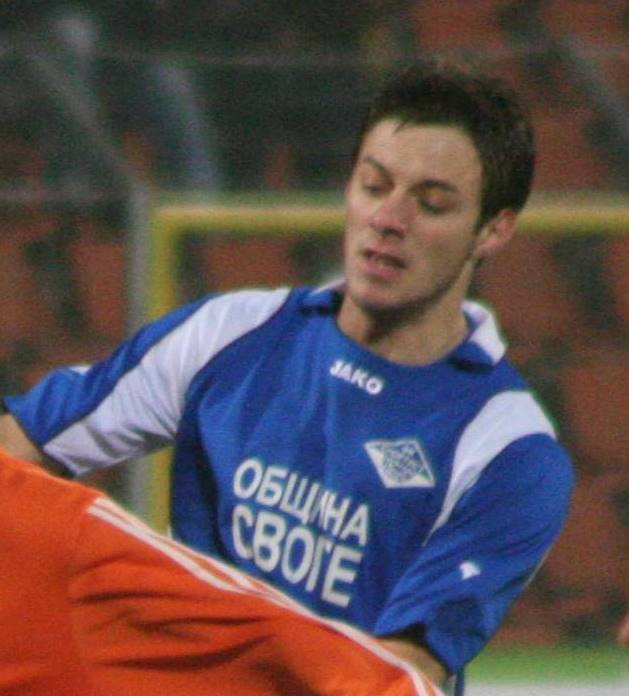

Personal information
- Full name: Nikolay Angelov Tsvetkov
- Date of birth: 10 August 1987 (age 39)
- Place of birth: Vidin, Bulgaria
- Height: 1.85 m (6 ft 1 in)
- Position: Attacking midfielder

Team information
- Current team: Bdin Vidin (manager)

Youth career
- 1995–2003: Balkan Botevgrad
- 2003–2006: Litex Lovech

Senior career*
Years	Team	Apps	(Gls)
2005–2007	Litex Lovech	0	(0)
2006–2007	→ Dunav Ruse (loan)	26	(2)
2007	Lokomotiv Mezdra	8	(0)
2008	Spartak Pleven	3	(0)
2008–2010	Sportist Svoge	54	(9)
2010–2011	Vidima-Rakovski	21	(1)
2011–2012	Bdin Vidin	23	(3)
2012–2013	Lokomotiv Mezdra	1	(1)
2013	Dardania Lausanne	13	(7)
2014–2015	Lokomotiv Mezdra	43	(21)
2015–2016	CSKA Sofia	29	(19)
2016	Etar Veliko Tarnovo	17	(4)
2017	Septemvri Sofia	10	(2)
2017–2018	Lokomotiv Sofia	29	(9)
2018	CSKA 1948	1	(0)
2018–2021	Montana	58	(10)
2021	Lokomotiv Sofia	12	(4)
2021–2022	Balkan Botevgrad	14	(7)
- * Club domestic league appearances and goals as of 3 November 2021

Nikolay Angelov Tsvetkov (Bulgarian: Николай Ангелов Цветков; born 10 August 1987) is a Bulgarian footballer who plays as a midfielder.

== Career ==
In June 2017, Tsvetkov joined Lokomotiv Sofia.

On 12 June 2018, Tsvetkov signed with CSKA 1948.

== Honours ==
=== Club ===
CSKA Sofia

- Bulgarian Cup: 2015–16
