= Vladimir Michev =

Bulgarian footballer (born 1986)

Personal information
- Full name: Vladimir Ivanov Michev
- Date of birth: 20 November 1985 (age 40)
- Place of birth: Sevlievo, Bulgaria
- Height: 1.79 m (5 ft 10 in)
- Position: Midfielder

Team information
- Current team: Sevlievo
- Number: 8

Youth career
- Vidima-Rakovski

Senior career*
Years	Team	Apps	(Gls)
2003–2009	Vidima-Rakovski	66	(12)
2007–2008	→ Etar 1924 (loan)	23	(2)
2009–2016	Montana	165	(11)
2016	Levski Karlovo	8	(2)
2017–2018	Lokomotiv GO	25	(1)
2018–2021	Kariana	55	(3)
2021–2022	Yantra Gabrovo	29	(0)
2022–	Sevlievo		
- * Club domestic league appearances and goals as of 30 March 2022

Vladimir Michev (Bulgarian: Владимир Мичев; born 20 November 1986) is a Bulgarian footballer who plays as a midfielder for Bulgarian Third League club Sevlievo.

Michev previously played for Vidima-Rakovski Sevlievo, Etar 1924, Montana, Levski Karlovo and Lokomotiv Gorna Oryahovitsa.
