= FC Minyor Pernik =

Bulgarian football club

Minyor Pernik
- Full name: Футболен Клуб Миньор Перник (Football Club Minyor Pernik)
- Nickname: Чуковете (The Hammers)
- Founded: 16 April 1919; 107 years ago as SC Krakra
- Ground: Stadion Minyor, Pernik
- Capacity: 8,000
- Head coach: Velislav Vutsov
- League: Southwest Third League
- 2025–26: Second League, 16th of 17 (relegated)
- Website: minyor-pernik.bg
Home colours	Away colours

FC Minyor (Bulgarian: ФК Миньор) is a football club in Pernik, Bulgaria, currently competing in the Third League, the third tier of Bulgarian football. Founded in 1919 as SC Krakra, the club's home ground since 1954 has been Stadion Minyor. The club's name comes from the fact that the area around the city of Pernik has had long traditions with mining and the mining industry.

The club's highest league finish in the top division is fourth, which was achieved in the 1955 and 1960–61 seasons. Minyor played in the Bulgarian Cup Final in 1958, finishing runners-up to Spartak Plovdiv.

Minyor has spent a total of 38 seasons in the top tier of Bulgarian football, most recently during the 2012–13 season.

== History ==
The origins of the club date back to 1919. Minyor came into existence with the merger of several football clubs from Pernik. In 1944, SC Krakra (founded in 1919), SC Svetkavitsa (founded in 1932), SC Benkovski (founded in 1936), and ZHSK (founded in 1941) merged to form SC Rudnichar. Since SC Krakra is the oldest of the clubs, the year 1919 is generally considered to be founding date of Minyor. After World War II, as Bulgaria became a People's Republic, closely following the model for sports in the Soviet Union, the club was renamed to Republikanets '46. The club finally came to be known as Minyor in 1952, which reflected the mining history of the city of Pernik.

The club joined the Bulgarian top division in 1951. That same year, they laid the foundations of a strong team, which, until the 1961–62 season, was among the top teams in Bulgaria. The first match in the division was on March 2, 1951, against Cherveno Zname Sofia. Minyor's best seasons in the top division were in 1955 and 1961, finishing both times at fourth place.

In 1956, Minyor's forward and captain Pavel Vladimirov became the top scorer of the division with 16 goals. Vladimirov holds Minyor's overall appearance record - 305 matches. The former forward is also the all-time leading scorer for the club with 98 goals.

In 1958, the club qualified for the final of the Bulgarian Cup, where the team lost to Spartak Plovdiv. In 1962, Minyor was relegated to the second division. Between 1951 and 1994, the club participated in either the top or second divisions, regularly being promoted and relegated, but never falling below the second level. Until the 2008–09 season, Minyor has played a total of 32 seasons in the first division. Minyor's biggest victory in A PFG to date is the 6–0 win against Torpedo Pleven in 1951. Minyor's largest defeat, 0–8, was against Beroe Stara Zagora in 1973.

Minyor Pernik's latest spell in the top flight began in 2008. They managed to return to the elite rank by winning the 2007-08 promotion play-off, beating Kaliakra Kavarna after a penalty shootout. Their first season since returning to the elite was quite successful as they finished 11th, with 35 points, including an away draw to Levski Sofia, the eventual champions.

The next season, 2009–10, was better for the hammers, as they managed to finish in eight place, under the management of Anton Velkov. Minyor collected 45 points, and managed to beat CSKA 0–3 in Sofia, which was the latter's only defeat at home for the season.

For the 2010–11 season, Minyor hired Stoycho Stoev, who replaced Anton Velkov due to poor results in the beginning of the season. Minyor eventually finished the season in 9th place, with 36 points.

Minyor decided to extend Stoev's contract for the 2011–12 season. They had another relatively successful season, finishing in 9th place again, with 36 points. Highlights from the season included a home 2–0 win over CSKA Sofia and an away win against Levski Sofia, the two most decorated Bulgarian teams. Minyor also reached the quarterfinals of the Bulgarian cup for the 2011-12 season. They were, however, eliminated by Litex by a score of 2–0.

Stoycho Stoev left the club at the end of the season and was replaced by Nikolay Todorov. However, Minyor dropped their form and eventually finished 14th, meaning they were relegated after a 5-year stay in the top level.

The team was supposed to play in the 2013-14 B Group, however due to very big financial problems, the owners of the club decided to abolish the current club and, and restart from V AFG. The reformed team, which carried the identity and traditions of the old one, started playing in the third tier from the 2013–14 season. Minyor played there in the following six seasons.

Minyor finished first in the Southwest Third League for the 2019-20 season and promoted to the Second League for the first time in 12 years.

In November 2022, Minyor was left without a major financial backing, when the mayor of Pernik decided to stop his backing for the club. This was a result of a violent situation that occurred during a Bulgarian cup match between Minyor and Beroe Stara Zagora, when Minyor and Beroe fans clashed with each other on the stands of Stadion Minyor, resulting in property damage for Beroe fans after the match. Minyor lost that game 0–2.

On March 10, 2023, Minyor announced a complete overhaul of the board of directors, with the new goal of the club being promotion to the First League. Despite the change in ownership and new hopes that were set, Minyor had a turbulent 2022–23 season, culminating in relegation from the Second League. This ended the club's three-year stay in the second level.

In October 2023, Minyor announced that Velizar Dimitrov, a former Minyor player, would become the new chairman of the club. Minyor finished first in the 2023–24 season in the Third League, achieving promotion back to the Second League. In the 2024–25 season Minyor survived by 8 points the relegation places, finishing 15th.

== Honours ==
- First League:
  - Fourth place (2): 1955, 1960–61
- Bulgarian Cup:
  - Runner-up: 1958
- Second League:
  - Winners (4): 1965–66, 1971–72, 1978–79, 1986–87
- Third League:
  - Winners (4): 1994–95, 2004–05, 2019–20, 2023-24

== Players ==
As of 23 February 2026

Note: Flags indicate national team as defined under FIFA eligibility rules; some limited exceptions apply. Players may hold more than one non-FIFA nationality.

No.	Pos.	Nation	Player
1	GK	BUL	Ivan Goshev
2	MF	BUL	Borislav Nikolov
3	DF	BUL	Pavlin Chilikov
4	DF	BUL	Miki Orachev
5	DF	BUL	Aleksandar Mihov
6	MF	BUL	Georgi Angelov
7	MF	BUL	Aleksandar Aleksandrov
8	MF	BUL	Valentin Dotsev (on loan from Septemvri Sofia)
9	FW	BUL	Preslav Yordanov
10	MF	BUL	Valentin Petrov
12	GK	BUL	Borislav Parvanov
13	MF	BUL	Yordan Yordanov
14	MF	BUL	Samuil Simeonov

No.	Pos.	Nation	Player
15	MF	UKR	Danilo Tarasenko
16	DF	BUL	Roberto Viktorov
17	FW	BUL	Kaloyan Simeonov
18	FW	BUL	Yanko Mihaylov
20	MF	BUL	Mario Danchev
21	MF	BUL	Viktor Vasilev
22	MF	BUL	Petar Vutsov
23	MF	BUL	Adrian Georgiev
24	MF	BUL	Stoil Yordanov
25	DF	BUL	Svetoslav Todorov
27	DF	BUL	Hristo Hristov
30	DF	UKR	Igor Romanyuk
39	DF	BUL	Mihael Orachev

For recent transfers, see Transfers summer 2025 and Transfers winter 2025–26.

== Notable players ==
Had international caps for their respective countries, held any club record, or had more than 100 league appearances. Players whose name is listed in bold represented their countries.

Bulgaria

- (Bulgaria) **Petar Argirov**
- (Bulgaria) **Kalin Bankov**
- (Bulgaria) **Krum Bibishkov**
- (Bulgaria) **Georgi Borisov**
- (Bulgaria) **Vasil Bozhikov**
- (Bulgaria) **Ivan Čvorović**
- (Bulgaria) **Velizar Dimitrov**
- (Bulgaria) **Spas Dzhevizov**
- (Bulgaria) **Anton Evtimov**
- (Bulgaria) **Kamen Hadzhiev**
- (Bulgaria) **Kostadin Hazurov**
- (Bulgaria) **Dimitar Iliev**

- (Bulgaria) Iliyan Iliev
- (Bulgaria) **Ivan Ivanov**
- (Bulgaria) **Kiril Ivkov**
- (Bulgaria) Georgi Karakanov
- (Bulgaria) Anton Kirov
- (Bulgaria) Yanek Kyuchukov
- (Bulgaria) **Zdravko Lazarov**
- (Bulgaria) Ivaylo Pargov
- (Bulgaria) Slavcho Pavlov
- (Bulgaria) Tomislav Pavlov
- (Bulgaria) Petar Petrov
- (Bulgaria) **Boyan Peykov**

- (Bulgaria) Viktor Raychev
- (Bulgaria) Dimitar Savov
- (Bulgaria) Anton Slavchev
- (Bulgaria) **Ivo Slavchev**
- (Bulgaria) **Yordan Todorov**
- (Bulgaria) **Metodi Tomanov**
- (Bulgaria) **Ventsislav Vasilev**
- (Bulgaria) **Preslav Yordanov**
- (Bulgaria) **Yordan Yordanov**

Europe

- (Slovakia) **Peter Lérant**
- (North Macedonia) **Vančo Trajanov**

Asia

- (Lebanon) **Samir Ayass**
- (Uzbekistan) **Georgi Georgiev**

== League positions ==
=== Previous names ===
- Pernik - 1970–73
- Krakra - 1969–70
- Torpedo - 1948–52
- Republicanets '46 - 1946–48

== Statistics and Records ==
Most league appearances for the club

Rank	Name	Nat	Apps
1	Pavel Vladimirov	(Bulgaria)	305
2	Georgi Yordanov	(Bulgaria)	243
3	Evlogi Banchev	(Bulgaria)	231
4	Slave Malinov	(Bulgaria)	225

Most league goals for the club

Rank	Name	Nat	Goals
1	Pavel Vladimirov	(Bulgaria)	98
2	Georgi Yordanov	(Bulgaria)	68
3	Ivan Danchev	(Bulgaria)	56
4	Oleg Pavlov	(Bulgaria)	51

Bulgarian league top scorer with the club

Year	Name	Nat	Goals
1956	Pavel Vladimirov	(Bulgaria)	16

Notes:

- Bold signals active players
- Correct as of 15 May 2008

== Managers ==
- (Bulgaria) Anton Velkov (Jul 2009–Sep 2010)
- (Bulgaria) Stoycho Stoev (Sep 2010–Sep 2012)
- (Bulgaria) Nikolay Todorov (Sep 2012–Jul 2014)
- (Bulgaria) Valeri Damyanov (Jul 2014–Dec 2014)
- (Bulgaria) Hristo Yanev (Jan 2015–Jul 2015)
- (Bulgaria) Danail Bachkov (Jun 2017–Nov 2017)
- (Bulgaria) Nikolay Todorov (Dec 2017–Sep 2018)
- (Bulgaria) Georgi Stankov (Sep 2018–Nov 2018)
- (Bulgaria) Anton Evtimov (Nov 2018–Dec 2018)
- (Bulgaria) Yuriy Vasev (Dec 2018–Oct 2020)
- (Bulgaria) Hristo Yanev (Oct 2020–Sep 2022)
- (Bulgaria) Petar Anestiev (Sep 2022)
- (Bulgaria) Emil Serafimov (Sep 2022–Mar 2023)
- (Bulgaria) Krasimir Petrov (Mar 2023–Jan 2023)
- (Bulgaria) Hristo Gospodinov (Jan 2023–Apr 2025)
- (Bulgaria) Angel Chervenkov (Apr 2025–)

== Supporters ==
Minyor's fans are known as the hammers or the yellow-blacks. They have a legendary hatred for Levski Sofia and the fans of both teams have had some big fights over the years, some of which have even involved rifles. Minyor fans are also infamous for their general hatred for Sofia. Their only friends are considered to be Botev Plovdiv, also yellow-black. The rivals of Minyor call them "orcs" due to the mining heritage of the town.
