= Samir Ayass =

Footballer (born 1990)

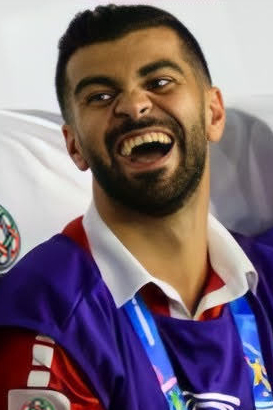
- Ayass with Lebanon in 2019

Personal information
- Full name: Samir Ahmed Ayass
- Date of birth: 24 December 1990 (age 35)
- Place of birth: Sofia, Bulgaria
- Height: 1.74 m (5 ft 9 in)
- Position: Midfielder

Youth career
- 1996–2009: CSKA Sofia

Senior career*
Years	Team	Apps	(Gls)
2008–2010	CSKA Sofia	0	(0)
2010	→ Akademik Sofia (loan)	13	(1)
2010	Akademik Sofia	13	(0)
2011	Minyor Pernik	6	(0)
2011–2012	Bansko	21	(1)
2012	Montana	3	(0)
2013	Lyubimets	23	(4)
2014–2015	Beroe Stara Zagora	24	(4)
2015–2016	CSKA Sofia	33	(12)
2016–2017	Dunav Ruse	30	(4)
2017–2019	Ahed	32	(2)
2019	Dunav Ruse	15	(0)
2020	Persiraja	3	(0)
2021	Botev Vratsa	8	(0)
2021	Perak	3	(0)
Total		277	(28)

International career
2011–2012	Bulgaria U21	3	(0)
2017–2019	Lebanon	13	(1)
- * Club domestic league appearances and goals

Samir Ahmed Ayass (Arabic: سمير أحمد اياس, Lebanese Arabic pronunciation: [saˈmiːr ˈʔaħmad ʔajˈjæːs]; Bulgarian: Самир Ахмед Аяс; born 24 December 1990) is a former professional footballer who played as a midfielder. Born in Bulgaria, he played for the Lebanon national team.

Coming through the youth system, Ayass began his senior career in 2008 at hometown club CSKA Sofia, before moving to cross-city side Akademik Sofia in 2010. He then went on to play for various Bulgarian sides, namely Minyor Pernik, Bansko, Montana, Lyubimets, and Beroe Stara Zagora, before returning to CSKA Sofia in 2015, winning the Bulgarian Cup. The following year he joined Dunav Ruse, before moving to Lebanon in 2017 to Ahed. After having won multiple titles, including the 2019 AFC Cup, Ayass returned to Dunav Ruse in 2019, before moving to Persiraja in Indonesia the following year. He moved back to Bulgaria in 2021, at Botev Vratsa, and then joined Malaysian side Perak.

Ayass represented Bulgaria at youth level, before switching allegiance to Lebanon, for whom he made his senior international debut in 2017. He helped his team reach the 2019 AFC Asian Cup for the first time through qualification, playing in the final tournament.

== Early life ==
Samir Ayass was born in Sofia, Bulgaria to a Lebanese father and a Bulgarian mother. He started his playing career at CSKA Sofia at the age of six.

== Club career ==
=== Dunav Ruse ===
On 6 October 2016, Ayass signed a one-and-a-half-year contract with Dunav Ruse. He scored his first goal for the team on 9 April 2017, in a 1–0 win over champions Ludogorets Razgrad.

=== Ahed ===
On 4 August 2017, Ayass signed a two-year contract with Lebanese Premier League champions Ahed for an undisclosed fee. He returned to Dunav Ruse in Bulgaria on 11 July 2019.

=== Persiraja ===
On 17 February 2020, Ayass moved to newly promoted Indonesian Liga 1 side Persiraja. Following the cancellation of the 2020 season due to the COVID-19 pandemic, Ayass was released. He re-joined in March 2021 on trial ahead of the 2021 season.

=== Botev Vratsa ===
On 3 April 2021, Ayass returned to Bulgaria, joining Botev Vratsa for the final part of the 2020–21 First Professional League. He made his debut on 8 April, coming on as a substitute and winning a penalty for his team; they lost 2–1 to Botev Plovdiv. Ayass helped Botev avoid relegation.

=== Perak ===
On 19 June 2021, Ayass moved to Perak in the Malaysia Super League. He left the club at the end of September after his contract expired.

== International career ==
=== Bulgaria ===
Ayass played for the Bulgarian under-21 team between 2011 and 2012, and was capped three times. However, he was never called up for the senior team.

=== Lebanon ===
Eligible to represent Lebanon through his father, on 20 March 2017 he accepted the call up for Lebanon for the match against Hong Kong on 28 March 2017, for the 2019 AFC Asian Cup qualification. He completed his debut, coming as a substitute on the 69th minute.

On 10 October 2017, Ayass scored his first international goal for Lebanon against North Korea, in a 5–0 home win at the Asian Cup qualifications. In December 2018, he was called up for the 2019 AFC Asian Cup squad, featuring in two group stage games.

== Style of play ==
Ayass is a technical midfielder with good attacking capabilities.

== Career statistics ==
=== Club ===
As of match played 12 September 2021

Appearances and goals by club, season and competition
Club	Season	League			National Cup (Note: Includes Bulgarian Cup, Lebanese FA Cup, Piala Indonesia)		Continental		Total	
Club	Season	Division	Apps	Goals	Apps	Goals	Apps	Goals	Apps	Goals
Akademik Sofia (loan)	2009–10	Bulgarian Second League	13	1	—		—		13	1
Akademik Sofia	2010–11	Bulgarian First League	13	0	—		—		13	0
Minyor Pernik	2010–11	Bulgarian First League	6	0	—		—		6	0
Bansko	2011–12	Bulgarian Second League	21	1	—		—		21	1
Montana	2012–13	Bulgarian First League	3	0	—		—		3	0
Lyubimets	2012–13	Bulgarian Second League	11	2	—		—		11	2
Lyubimets	2013–14	Bulgarian First League	12	2	1	0	—		13	2
Lyubimets	Total		23	4	1	0	0	0	24	4
Beroe Stara Zagora	2013–14	Bulgarian First League	11	2	—		—		11	2
Beroe Stara Zagora	2014–15	Bulgarian First League	13	2	3	0	0	0	16	2
Beroe Stara Zagora	Total		24	4	3	0	0	0	27	4
CSKA Sofia	2015–16	Third League	29	12	6	2	—		35	14
CSKA Sofia	2016–17	Bulgarian First League	4	0	—		—		4	0
CSKA Sofia	Total		33	12	6	2	0	0	39	14
Dunav Ruse	2016–17	Bulgarian First League	27	4	2	0	—		29	4
Dunav Ruse	2017–18	Bulgarian First League	3	0	—		2 (Note: Appearances in UEFA Europa League first qualifying round)	0	5	0
Dunav Ruse	Total		30	4	2	0	2	0	34	4
Ahed	2017–18	Lebanese Premier League	16	1	—		7 (Note: Appearances in AFC Cup)	1	23	2
Ahed	2018–19	Premier League	16	1	—		6	0	22	1
Ahed	Total		32	2	0	0	13	1	45	3
Dunav Ruse	2019–20	Bulgarian First League	15	0	1	0	—		16	0
Persiraja	2020	Liga 1 (Indonesia)	3	0	—		—		3	0
Botev Vratsa	2020–21	Bulgarian First League	8	0	0	0	—		8	0
Perak	2021	Malaysia Super League	3	0	—		—		3	0
Career total			198	16	13	2	16	1	227	19

=== International ===
As of match played 10 October 2017
Scores and results list Lebanon's goal tally first, score column indicates score after each Ayass goal.

List of international goals scored by Samir Ayass
No.	Date	Venue	Opponent	Score	Result	Competition
1	10 October 2017	Camille Chamoun Sports City Stadium, Beirut, Lebanon	North Korea	3–0	5–0	2019 AFC Asian Cup qualification

== Honours ==
CSKA Sofia

- Bulgarian Cup: 2015–16

Ahed

- AFC Cup: 2019
- Lebanese Premier League: 2017–18, 2018–19
- Lebanese FA Cup: 2017–18, 2018–19
- Lebanese Super Cup: 2017, 2018

== See also ==
- List of Lebanon international footballers born outside Lebanon
- List of sportspeople who competed for more than one nation
