= 2015–16 Bulgarian Cup =

Tournament details
- Country: Bulgaria
- Teams: 32

Final positions
- Champions: CSKA Sofia (20th title)
- Runners-up: Montana

Tournament statistics
- Matches played: 33
- Goals scored: 92 (2.79 per match)
- Top goal scorer(s): (Bulgaria) Preslav Yordanov; 6 goals

The 2015–16 Bulgarian Cup was the 34th official edition of the Bulgarian annual football knockout tournament. The competition began on 23 September 2015 with the matches of the First Round and finished with the final on 24 May 2016. Cherno More Varna were the defending champions.

For the first time in the history of this competition the winner, CSKA Sofia, came from the third division of Bulgarian football. However as the club was excluded from participating in the 2016–17 European competitions by the UEFA Club Financial Control Body., its place was taken up by the runners-up of the 2015–16 A Group, Levski Sofia, who is entitled to participate in the second qualifying round of the 2016–17 UEFA Europa League.

== Participating clubs ==
The following teams competed in the cup:
(Teams still active are in bold)

| **2015–16 A Group**; 10 clubs | **2015–16 B Group**; 14 non-reserve clubs | **Winners of 4 regional competitions** 8 clubs |
| Ludogorets Razgrad; Beroe Stara Zagora; Litex Lovech; Botev Plovdiv; Levski Sofia; Cherno More Varna; Slavia Sofia; Lokomotiv Plovdiv; Montana; Pirin Blagoevgrad | Lokomotiv Gorna Oryahovitsa; Bansko; Dobrudzha Dobrich; Sozopol; Neftochimic Burgas; Botev Galabovo; Lokomotiv 2012 Mezdra; Pirin Razlog; Vereya Stara Zagora; Septemvri Simitli; Spartak Pleven; Dunav Ruse; Pomorie; Oborishte Panagyurishte | from North-West zone: Etar Veliko Tarnovo; Lokomotiv 1929 Mezdra; from North-East zone: Chernomorets Balchik; Svetkavitsa Targovishte; from South-East zone: Vihar Stroevo; Nesebar; from South-West zone: **CSKA Sofia**; Pirin Gotse Delchev |

== First round ==
The draw was conducted on 11 September 2015. The games were played between 22 and 24 September 2015. On this stage all of the participants started their participation i.e. the 10 teams from A PFG (first division), the 14 teams from the B PFG (second division) and the 8 winners from the regional amateur competitions.

| 22 September 2015 | Lokomotiv 2012 Mezdra **(II)** | **0–3** | **Litex Lovech** | Mezdra |
| 16:00 | | Report | Johnsen 52'; Yordanov 78'; Viana 83' | Stadium: Stadion Lokomotiv; Attendance: 350; Referee: Georgi Dimitrov (Sofia) |

| 22 September 2015 | Chernomorets Balchik **(III)** | **0–3** | **Lokomotiv Gorna Oryahovitsa (II)** | Albena |
| 16:00 | | Report | Kanev 20', 38', 69' | Stadium: Stadion Albena-1; Attendance: 500; Referee: Ivelin Zanev (Ruse) |

| 22 September 2015 | **Dunav Ruse (II)** | **4–0** | Botev Galabovo **(II)** | Ruse |
| 16:00 | Budinov 9'; Chitakov 12'; Nenov 29'; Kovachev 63' | Report | | Stadium: Gradski stadion Attendance: 2,530; Referee: Dimitar Zhelyazkov (Silistra) |

| 23 September 2015 | Oborishte Panagyurishte **(II)** | **0–2** | **Lokomotiv Plovdiv** | Panagyurishte |
| 16:00 | | Report | Baldovaliev 12', 45+1' | Stadium: Stadion Orcho Voyvoda; Attendance: 500; Referee: Ivaylo Stoyanov (Petrich) |

| 23 September 2015 | Pirin Razlog **(II)** | **1–7** | **Cherno More Varna** | Razlog |
| 16:00 | D. Dimitrov 53' | Report | Bijev 23', 54', 74'; Rasim 34'; Raykov 38', 90'; Klok 58' | Stadium: Gradski stadion Referee: Angel Angelov (Sofia) |

| 23 September 2015 | Lokomotiv 1929 Mezdra **(IV)** | **0–5** | **Ludogorets Razgrad** | Mezdra |
| 16:00 | | Report | Smirnov 16'; Angulo 50'; Sasha 61'; Karamfilov 66', 90' | Stadium: Stadion Lokomotiv; Referee: Georgi Ignatov (Sofia) |

| 23 September 2015 | **Vihar Stroevo (IV)** | **0–0** (a.e.t.) (**5–3** p) | Dobrudzha Dobrich **(II)** | Stroevo |
| 16:00 | | Report | | Stadium: Stadion Stroevo; Referee: Valentin Stanchev (Sliven) |
| | **Penalties** |
| | Atanasov (penalty scored); Urumov (penalty scored); Belilov (penalty scored); Yonchev (penalty scored); Hasan (penalty scored) | | (penalty scored) K. Dimitrov; (penalty scored) Dimov; (penalty missed) P.G. Petkov; (penalty scored) Yovchev |

| 23 September 2015 | Svetkavitsa Targovishte **(III)** | **0–4** | **Beroe Stara Zagora** | Targovishte |
| 16:00 | | Report | Kostov 12'; Isa 41', 58'; Dinkov 70' | Stadium: Stadion Dimitar Burkov; Referee: Nikola Atanasov (Veliko Tarnovo) |

| 23 September 2015 | **Spartak Pleven (II)** | **2–1** | Slavia Sofia | Pleven |
| 16:00 | Tenev 1'; Todorov 62' | Report | Manzorro 23' (pen.) | Stadium: Gradski stadion Referee: Aleksandar Kostadinov (Sofia) |

| 23 September 2015 | Septemvri Simitli **(II)** | **0–4** | **Botev Plovdiv** | Krupnik |
| 16:00 | | Report | Baltanov 24', 54'; Genov 51'; Kifouéti 82' | Stadium: Arena Krupnik; Referee: Petar Dorovski (Sofia) |

| 23 September 2015 | Etar Veliko Tarnovo **(III)** | **1–1** (a.e.t.) (**4–5** p) | **Sozopol (II)** | Veliko Tarnovo |
| 16:00 | Trifonov 70' | Report | Hadzhiev 16' | Stadium: Stadion Ivaylo; Referee: Dragomir Draganov (Varna) |
| | **Penalties** |
| | Ivanov (penalty scored); Trifonov (penalty scored); Petrov (penalty missed); Iliev (penalty scored); Baychev (penalty scored) | | (penalty scored) Mitev; (penalty scored) Kaloyanov; (penalty scored) Mustafa; (penalty scored) Georgiev; (penalty scored) Koev |

| 23 September 2015 | Pirin Gotse Delchev **(III)** | **1–3** | **Montana** | Gotse Delchev |
| 16:00 | Gogov 84' | Report | Iliev 22', 47'; S. Georgiev 45' | Stadium: Gradski stadion Referee: Rumen Hristov (Pleven) |

| 23 September 2015 | **Nesebar (III)** | **1–0** | Pirin Blagoevgrad | Nesebar |
| 16:00 | Angelov 74' | Report | | Stadium: Gradski stadion Referee: Ryustem Karagaren (Asenovgrad) |

| 23 September 2015 | Vereya Stara Zagora **(II)** | **1–3** (a.e.t.) | **Bansko (II)** | Stara Zagora |
| 16:00 | Ganev 35' | Report | Pavlov 28'; Chipilov 97', 118' | Stadium: Trace Arena; Referee: Valentin Zhelezov (Burgas) |

| 23 September 2015 | **CSKA Sofia (III)** | **3–1** | Neftochimic Burgas **(II)** | Sofia |
| 18:45 | P. Yordanov 17'; Ayass 53'; Galchev 55' | Report | Lyubenov 61' | Stadium: Stadion Balgarska Armiya; Attendance: 5,200; Referee: Boyan Slavkov (Plovdiv) |

| 24 September 2015 | Pomorie **(II)** | **0–0** (a.e.t.) (**2–4** p) | **Levski Sofia** | Burgas |
| 18:45 | | Report | | Stadium: Stadion Lazur; Attendance: 1,500; Referee: Stefan Apostolov (Blagoevgrad) |
| | **Penalties** |
| | K. Georgiev (penalty scored); Shokolarov (penalty missed); Lemperov (penalty scored); Petkov (penalty missed) | | (penalty scored) Procházka; (penalty scored) Kostadinov; (penalty scored) Karner; (penalty missed) Kurdov; (penalty scored) Gadzhev |

== Second round ==
The draw was conducted on 30 September 2015. The games will be played between 27 and 29 October 2015. On this stage the participants will be the 16 winners from the first round.

| 27 October 2015 | Vihar Stroevo **(IV)** | **0–5** | **Cherno More Varna** | Plovdiv |
| 13:30 EET | | Report | Raykov 39', 47'; Varea 43'; Yoskov 54'; Kostadinov 84' | Stadium: Stadion Komatevo; Attendance: 450; Referee: Stoyan Denev (Veliko Tarnovo) |

| 27 October 2015 | Spartak Pleven **(II)** | **0–2** | **CSKA Sofia (III)** | Pleven |
| 13:30 EET | | Report | P. Yordanov 24', 84' | Stadium: Gradski stadion Attendance: 4,170; Referee: Stanislav Stavrov (Veliko Tarnovo) |

| 27 October 2015 | **Sozopol (II)** | **1–0** | Botev Plovdiv | Sozopol |
| 15:00 EET | Manev 4' | Report | | Stadium: Arena Sozopol; Attendance: 1,582; Referee: Angel Angelov (Sofia) |

| 27 October 2015 | **Litex Lovech** | **4–2** | Dunav Ruse **(II)** | Lovech |
| 16:30 EET | Asprilla 29'; Minchev 63', 66'; Arsénio 88' | Report | Nenov 36'; Dimitrov 90+4' | Stadium: Stadion Lovech; Attendance: 350; Referee: Dragomir Draganov (Varna) |

| 28 October 2015 | Nesebar **(III)** | **1–3** | **Levski Sofia** | Nesebar |
| 13:30 EET | Kostov 32' | Report | Kraev 13', 28'; Bedoya 27' | Stadium: Gradski stadion Attendance: 1,020; Referee: Georgi Kabakov (Plovdiv) |

| 28 October 2015 | Lokomotiv Plovdiv | **1–1** (a.e.t.) (**2–4** p) | **Montana** | Plovdiv |
| 17:30 EET | Gargorov 43' | Report | Minchev 65' | Stadium: Stadion Lokomotiv; Attendance: 1,970; Referee: Tasko Taskov (Sofia) |
| | **Penalties** |
| | Kamburov (penalty scored); Kiki (penalty scored); Gargorov (penalty missed); Krumov (penalty missed) | | (penalty scored) Lazarov; (penalty scored) Dosti; (penalty missed) A. Georgiev; (penalty scored) Michev; (penalty scored) Minchev |

| 29 October 2015 | **Lokomotiv Gorna Oryahovitsa (II)** | **1–0** | Ludogorets Razgrad | Gorna Oryahovitsa |
| 13:30 EET | Penev 4' | Report | | Stadium: Stadion Lokomotiv; Attendance: 3,830; Referee: Nikolay Yordanov (Sofia) |

| 29 October 2015 | **Beroe Stara Zagora** | **3–1** | Bansko **(II)** | Stara Zagora |
| 16:30 EET | Andonov 40', 64'; Elias 82' | Report | R. Ivanov 44' | Stadium: Stadion Beroe; Attendance: 800; Referee: Vladimir Valkov (Plovdiv) |

== Quarter-finals ==
The draw was conducted on 3 November 2015. The games will be played between 8 and 10 December 2015. On this stage the participants will be the 8 winners from the second round.

| 8 December 2015 | **Litex Lovech** | **3–0** (a.e.t.) | Levski Sofia | Lovech |
| 17:30 | Arsénio 101'; Despodov 109', 112' | Report | | Stadium: Stadion Lovech; Attendance: 4,250; Referee: Tasko Taskov (Sofia) |

| 9 December 2015 | Lokomotiv Gorna Oryahovitsa **(II)** | **1–1** (a.e.t.) (**3–4** p) | **Montana** | Gorna Oryahovitsa |
| 13:00 | Kanev 29' | Report | Michev 69' | Stadium: Stadion Lokomotiv; Attendance: 2,100; Referee: Nikolay Yordanov (Sofia) |
| | **Penalties** |
| | Fidanin (penalty scored); Dimitrov (penalty scored); Raynov (penalty missed); Apostolov (penalty scored); Balakov (penalty missed) | | (penalty missed) Todorov; (penalty scored) Michev; (penalty scored) Popov; (penalty scored) G. Angelov; (penalty scored) Baldzhiyski |

| 9 December 2015 | **Beroe Stara Zagora** | **0–0** (a.e.t.) (**5–3** p) | Cherno More Varna | Stara Zagora |
| 17:30 | | Report | | Stadium: Stadion Beroe; Attendance: 1,850; Referee: Georgi Kabakov (Plovdiv) |
| | **Penalties** |
| | Dinkov (penalty scored); Ivanov (penalty scored); Kostov (penalty scored); Isa (penalty scored); Elias (penalty scored) | | (penalty scored) Sténio; (penalty missed) Burkhardt; (penalty scored) Rasim; (penalty scored) Eugénio |

| 10 December 2015 | **CSKA Sofia (III)** | **3–0** | Sozopol **(II)** | Sofia |
| 17:00 | P. Yordanov 78', 86'; Tsvetanov 90+7' | Report | | Stadium: Stadion Balgarska Armiya; Attendance: 4,330; Referee: Georgi Ignatov (Sofia) |

== Semi-finals ==
The draw was to be conducted on 15 December 2015. The draw was postponed because of the expulsion of Litex Lovech from the A PFG after the team was ordered off the pitch in a controversial league match against Levski Sofia. At the time it was not clear how this would affect Litex's continued participation in this edition of the Bulgarian Cup. A new date for the draw was scheduled for the 16th of February 2016. The first legs were played on 6 April and the second legs were played on 20 and 21 April 2016.

=== First legs ===
| 6 April 2016 | **Montana** | **2−0** | **Litex Lovech** | Montana |
| 17:00 | S. Georgiev 22', 70' | Report | | Stadium: Stadion Ogosta; Attendance: 840; Referee: Ivaylo Stoyanov (Petrich) |

| 6 April 2016 | **Beroe Stara Zagora** | **0−2** | **CSKA Sofia (III)** | Stara Zagora |
| 19:15 | | Report | Ayass 5'; Galchev 54' | Stadium: Stadion Beroe; Attendance: 9,500; Referee: Tsvetan Krastev (Varna) |

=== Second legs ===
| 20 April 2016 | **CSKA Sofia (III)** | **2−0** (**4−0** agg.) | Beroe Stara Zagora | Sofia |
| 20:00 | P. Yordanov 3'; Tsvetkov 41' | Report | | Stadium: Stadion Balgarska Armiya; Attendance: 15,000; Referee: Ivaylo Stoyanov (Petrich) |

| 21 April 2016 | Litex Lovech | **1−0** (**1−2** agg.) | **Montana** | Lovech |
| 20:00 | Malinov 33' | Report | | Stadium: Stadion Lovech; Attendance: 1,500; Referee: Stanislav Stavrov (Veliko Tarnovo) |

== Final ==
24 May 2016
20:00 EEST

| Montana | 0−1 | CSKA Sofia |
|---|---|---|
| | | Malamov 12' |

Vasil Levski National Stadium, Sofia
Attendance: 33,345
Referee: Stanislav Todorov (Shumen)

== Statistics ==
=== Top scorers ===
| Rank | Scorer | Club | Goals |
|---|---|---|---|
| 1 | (Bulgaria) Preslav Yordanov | CSKA Sofia | 6 |
| 2 | (Bulgaria) Tihomir Kanev | Lokomotiv Gorna Oryahovitsa | 4 |
| 2 | (Bulgaria) Simeon Raykov | Cherno More | 4 |
| 4 | (Bulgaria) Villyan Bijev | Cherno More | 3 |
| 4 | (Bulgaria) Sergey Georgiev | Montana | 3 |
| 6 | (Bulgaria) Georgi Andonov | Beroe | 2 |
| 6 | (Portugal) Arsénio | Litex Lovech | 2 |
| 6 | (Bulgaria) Samir Ayass | CSKA Sofia | 2 |
| 6 | (North Macedonia) Zoran Baldovaliev | Lokomotiv Plovdiv | 2 |
| 6 | (Bulgaria) Lachezar Baltanov | Botev Plovdiv | 2 |
| 6 | (Bulgaria) Atanas Chipilov | Bansko | 2 |
| 6 | (Bulgaria) Kiril Despodov | Litex Lovech | 2 |
| 6 | (Bulgaria) Boris Galchev | CSKA Sofia | 2 |
| 6 | (Bulgaria) Atanas Iliev | Montana | 2 |
| 6 | (Bulgaria) Ismail Isa | Beroe | 2 |
| 6 | (Bulgaria) Borimir Karamfilov | Ludogrets Razgrad | 2 |
| 6 | (Bulgaria) Bozhidar Kraev | Levski Sofia | 2 |
| 6 | (Bulgaria) Georgi Minchev | Litex Lovech | 2 |
| 6 | (Bulgaria) Yuliyan Nenov | Dunav Ruse | 2 |

=== Hat-tricks ===
| Player | For | Against | Result | Date |
|---|---|---|---|---|
| (Bulgaria) Tihomir Kanev | Lokomotiv Gorna Oryahovitsa | Chernomorets Balchik | 3–0 | 22 September 2015 |
| (Bulgaria) Villyan Bijev | Cherno More | Pirin Razlog | 7–1 | 23 September 2015 |

== See also ==
- 2015–16 A Group
- 2015–16 B Group
- 2015–16 V AFG
