= List of Bulgarian football transfers summer 2016 =

This is a list of Bulgarian football transfers for the 2016 summer transfer window. Only transfers involving a team from the two professional leagues, First League and Second League are listed.

== First league ==
=== Beroe Stara Zagora ===
In:

No.	Pos.	Nation	Player
3	MF	GHA	Carlos Ohene (from (Cyprus) AEL Limassol)
4	MF	JPN	Kohei Kato (from (Poland) Podbeskidzie Bielsko-Biała)
7	FW	BUL	Aleksandar Kolev (from (Belgium) Geel)
8	MF	BUL	Vasil Panayotov (from (Poland) Zawisza Bydgoszcz)
9	MF	BUL	Radoslav Kirilov (on loan from (Italy) Chievo Verona)
10	MF	BUL	Stanislav Dryanov (from Neftochimic Burgas)
19	MF	BUL	Aleksandar Vasilev (on loan from Ludogorets Razgrad)
23	MF	BUL	Borislav Tsonev (from Levski Sofia)
24	DF	BUL	Hristofor Hubchev (from Montana)
27	MF	ESP	Marquitos (from (Poland) Górnik Łęczna)
30	FW	COD	Junior Mapuku (from (Turkey) Bandırmaspor)
32	MF	BUL	Emil Gargorov (from Lokomotiv Plovdiv)
77	FW	CTA	David Manga (from (Romania) Târgu Mureș)
91	MF	BUL	Erik Pochanski (from Lokomotiv GO)

Out:

No.	Pos.	Nation	Player
3	DF	BUL	Vladimir Zafirov (to Vereya)
7	FW	BUL	Georgi Andonov (to Cherno More)
8	MF	BUL	Georgi Sarmov (to (Moldova) Dacia Chișinău)
9	FW	BUL	Stanislav Kostov (to Pirin Blagoevgrad)
10	FW	BUL	Ismail Isa (to (Moldova) Dacia Chișinău)
16	MF	BUL	Ivaylo Angelov (on loan to Botev Galabovo)
19	MF	BUL	Ivelin Iliev (on loan to Botev Galabovo)
21	MF	BRA	Elias (to Vereya)
23	GK	BUL	Ilko Pirgov (to Lokomotiv Plovdiv)
26	MF	FRA	Salim Kerkar (to Vereya)
27	MF	FRA	Igor Djoman (to Lokomotiv GO)
73	MF	BUL	Steven Petkov (to Montana)
77	FW	BUL	Spas Delev (to (Poland) Pogoń Szczecin)
87	MF	FRA	Benjamin Morel (to (Slovenia) Domžale)
—	DF	BUL	Plamen Tenev (on loan to Nesebar, previously on loan at Vereya)
—	MF	BUL	Kiril Lichev (on loan to Oborishte, previously on loan at Vereya)

=== Botev Plovdiv ===
In:

No.	Pos.	Nation	Player
2	DF	BUL	Tsvetomir Panov (from Slavia Sofia)
4	DF	BRA	Rafael (from (Brazil) ABC)
6	DF	BUL	Daniel Zlatkov (from Cherno More)
7	MF	BRA	Felipe Brisola (from (Brazil) Itumbiara)
14	MF	CIV	Yaya Meledje (from Septemvri Sofia)
16	MF	CPV	Sténio (from Cherno More)
20	FW	FRA	Omar Kossoko (from (France) Mantes)
22	GK	BUL	Georgi Georgiev (from (Iran) Gostaresh Foulad)
25	DF	BUL	Krum Stoyanov (from Lokomotiv Plovdiv)
37	FW	BRA	João Paulo (from (Brazil) Ferroviária)
71	DF	BUL	Milen Kikarin (from CSKA Sofia)
73	FW	BUL	Ivan Stoyanov (from Montana)
88	FW	BUL	Daniel Kutev (from (Greece) Nestos Chrysoupoli)
99	GK	BUL	Pavel Petkov (from Lokomotiv GO)
—	DF	BUL	Kostadin Stoyanov (from Vereya II)
—	MF	BUL	Asen Chandarov (from Pirin Razlog)

Out:

No.	Pos.	Nation	Player
1	GK	BRA	Victor Golas (to (Portugal) Belenenses)
3	DF	BUL	Georgi Kupenov (on loan to Septemvri Sofia)
4	DF	UKR	Ihor Oshchypko (released)
7	MF	BUL	Mariyan Ognyanov (to Neftochimic Burgas)
9	MF	BUL	Emil Kamberov (on loan to Oborishte)
11	DF	BUL	Yordan Hristov (to (Cyprus) Ermis Aradippou)
13	FW	BUL	Ismet Ramadan (on loan to Levski Karlovo)
19	FW	BUL	Boris Tyutyukov (on loan to Vitosha Bistritsa)
23	MF	NED	Gregory Nelson (end of contract)
24	DF	BUL	Lazar Marin (to CSKA Sofia)
26	MF	BUL	Radoslav Apostolov (on loan to Levski Karlovo)
28	DF	BUL	Filip Filipov (to (Cyprus) Ethnikos Achna)
30	MF	BUL	Bozhidar Vasev (to Slavia Sofia)
66	DF	BUL	Orlin Starokin (to Pirin Blagoevgrad)
84	GK	BUL	Valentin Galev (to Septemvri Sofia)
88	MF	BUL	Milen Gamakov (to (Poland) Lechia Gdańsk)
91	MF	FRA	Rahavi Kifouéti (to Lokomotiv GO)
—	DF	BUL	Kostadin Stoyanov (released)
—	MF	BUL	Asen Chandarov (to Septemvri Sofia)
—	MF	BUL	Rangel Ignatov (on loan to Nesebar, previously on loan at Pirin Razlog)

=== Cherno More ===
In:

No.	Pos.	Nation	Player
6	MF	BUL	Aleksandar Tsvetkov (from Litex Lovech)
7	MF	POR	Hugo Seco (from (Portugal) Académica)
8	MF	CZE	Jan Malík (from (Czech Republic) Zbrojovka Brno)
13	MF	BUL	Ivan Kokonov (from Montana)
29	FW	SVK	Marek Kuzma (from (Slovakia) Zlaté Moravce)
31	GK	CZE	Přemysl Kovář (from (Israel) Hapoel Haifa)
33	GK	BUL	Emil Mihaylov (from Etar Veliko Tarnovo)
73	DF	CZE	Ondřej Sukup (from (Czech Republic) Baník Ostrava)
97	MF	BUL	Nikolay Minkov (loan return from Dobrudzha Dobrich)
—	DF	BUL	Daniel Zlatkov (from Botev Plovdiv)
—	FW	BUL	Georgi Andonov (from Beroe Stara Zagora)

Out:

No.	Pos.	Nation	Player
6	DF	MLI	Mamoutou Coulibaly (end of contract)
7	MF	BUL	Bekir Rasim (to Pomorie)
8	MF	CPV	Sténio (to Botev Plovdiv)
10	MF	NED	Marc Klok (to (England) Oldham Athletic)
11	FW	BUL	Zhivko Petkov (to Neftochimic Burgas)
13	MF	BUL	Simeon Raykov (to Lokomotiv Plovdiv)
19	MF	MTQ	Mathias Coureur (to (Georgia (country)) Dinamo Tbilisi)
23	MF	BUL	Ivan Valchanov (to Neftochimic Burgas)
28	MF	SRB	Ivan Marković (to (South Korea) Gyeongnam)
33	GK	BUL	Georgi Kitanov (to CSKA Sofia)
55	DF	BUL	Borislav Stoychev (to (Cyprus) Ethnikos Achna)
70	DF	POR	Pedro Eugénio (to Vereya)
77	MF	BUL	Andreas Vasev (to Montana)
—	DF	BUL	Daniel Zlatkov (to Botev Plovdiv)
—	FW	BUL	Georgi Andonov (to Vereya)

=== CSKA Sofia ===
In:

No.	Pos.	Nation	Player
2	DF	BUL	Stoycho Atanasov (from Litex Lovech II)
3	DF	BUL	Anton Nedyalkov (from Litex Lovech)
5	DF	COL	Rafa Pérez (from Litex Lovech)
6	MF	POR	Rúben Pinto (on loan from (Portugal) Belenenses)
7	MF	POR	Diogo Viana (from Litex Lovech)
10	MF	POR	Arsénio (from Litex Lovech)
11	DF	BUL	Stanislav Manolev (from (Russia) Kuban Krasnodar)
12	GK	BUL	Georgi Kitanov (from Cherno More)
15	MF	BUL	Kristiyan Malinov (from Litex Lovech)
17	MF	POR	David Simão (from (Portugal) Arouca)
18	MF	BUL	Aleksandar Georgiev (from Litex Lovech)
19	FW	BUL	Kiril Despodov (from Litex Lovech)
20	MF	CMR	Petrus Boumal (from Litex Lovech)
21	FW	POR	Rui Pedro (from (Portugal) Académica)
22	MF	BUL	Nikola Kolev (from Litex Lovech)
23	DF	BUL	Aleksandar Dyulgerov (from Pirin Blagoevgrad)
24	DF	BUL	Lazar Marin (from Botev Plovdiv)
26	MF	COL	Gustavo Culma (from Litex Lovech II)
27	FW	BUL	Georgi Minchev (from Litex Lovech)
28	DF	BUL	Plamen Galabov (from Litex Lovech)
30	GK	BUL	Aleksandar Konov (from Litex Lovech)
—	MF	BUL	Ivan Minchev (from Montana)
—	MF	BUL	Emil Petrov (from Litex Lovech)
—	MF	BUL	Rumen Rumenov (from Litex Lovech)
—	FW	COL	Wilmar Jordán (from (China) Tianjin Teda)

Out:

No.	Pos.	Nation	Player
3	DF	BUL	Kiril Dinchev (retired)
5	DF	BUL	Nikolay Dichev (to Lokomotiv GO)
6	DF	BUL	Aleksandar Branekov (to Slavia Sofia)
7	MF	BUL	Momchil Tsvetanov (to Vereya)
10	MF	BUL	Aleksandar Aleksandrov (to Neftochimic Burgas)
12	GK	BUL	Stoyan Kolev (to Neftochimic Burgas)
13	MF	BUL	Yordan Yordanov (to Neftochimic Burgas)
14	MF	BUL	Samir Ayass (to Dunav Ruse)
17	DF	BUL	Milen Kikarin (to Botev Plovdiv)
18	FW	BUL	Aykut Ramadan (on loan to Tsarsko Selo)
19	MF	BUL	Mario Yordanov (released)
20	MF	BUL	Stanislav Malamov (to Neftochimic Burgas)
21	DF	BUL	Viktor Raychev (released)
22	MF	BUL	Nikolay Tsvetkov (to Etar Veliko Tarnovo)
24	FW	BUL	Kostadin Hazurov (to Neftochimic Burgas)
25	DF	BUL	Angel Granchov (to Neftochimic Burgas)
—	MF	BUL	Ivan Minchev (to Slavia Sofia)
—	MF	BUL	Emil Petrov (on loan to Spartak Pleven)
—	MF	BUL	Rumen Rumenov (on loan to Neftochimic Burgas)
—	FW	COL	Wilmar Jordán (released)

=== Dunav Ruse ===
In:

No.	Pos.	Nation	Player
2	DF	BUL	Georgi Kremenliev (from Bansko)
5	DF	BUL	Teynur Marem (from Ludogorets Razgrad)
6	MF	BUL	Samir Ayass (from CSKA Sofia)
10	MF	BUL	Vasil Shopov (from Litex Lovech)
16	MF	BUL	Stefan Mitev (from Septemvri Sofia)
17	MF	BUL	Spas Georgiev (from (Scotland) Livingston)
30	GK	BUL	Evgeni Aleksandrov (from Litex Lovech)
66	DF	TJK	Iskandar Dzhalilov (from (Russia) Volga Nizhny Novgorod)
91	MF	TJK	Nuriddin Davronov (from (Tajikistan) Istiklol)
—	DF	MKD	Darko Stojanov (from (North Macedonia) Bregalnica Štip)

Out:

No.	Pos.	Nation	Player
2	DF	BUL	Georgi Kremenliev (on loan to Tsarsko Selo)
10	MF	BUL	Georgi Chakarov (to Neftochimic Burgas)
14	DF	BUL	Nikolay Parnarov (to Oborishte)
16	DF	BUL	Martin Kovachev (to (North Macedonia) Pelister)
20	FW	BUL	Yordan Dimitrov (released)
25	MF	BUL	Angel Zdravchev (to Litex Lovech)
92	GK	BUL	Radosvet Hristov (to Lokomotiv Ruse)
—	DF	MKD	Darko Stojanov (released)

=== Levski Sofia ===
In:

No.	Pos.	Nation	Player
3	DF	BUL	Dimitar Pirgov (from Slavia Sofia)
9	FW	BUL	Iliyan Mitsanski (from (South Korea) Suwon)
10	MF	BUL	Galin Ivanov (from (Turkey) Samsunspor)
11	MF	PER	Jean Deza (from (France) Montpellier)
20	FW	ESP	Añete (from (Azerbaijan) Neftçi Baku)
21	GK	BUL	Ivan Čvorović (from Ludogorets Razgrad)
23	DF	SWE	Simon Sandberg (from (Sweden) Häcken)
44	DF	BUL	Viktor Genev (from (Belarus) Dinamo Minsk)

Out:

No.	Pos.	Nation	Player
10	MF	ESP	Miguel Bedoya (to (Cyprus) Apollon Limassol)
11	FW	CMR	Justin Mengolo (released)
18	MF	BUL	Borislav Tsonev (to Beroe Stara Zagora)
19	FW	BUL	Iliya Dimitrov (on loan to Pirin, previously on loan at Neftochimic)
20	DF	BUL	Galin Tashev (on loan to Etar Veliko Tarnovo)
21	MF	BUL	Radoslav Tsonev (to (Italy) Lecce)
24	GK	BUL	Aleksandar Lyubenov (to Lokomotiv Plovdiv)
30	DF	AUT	Maximilian Karner (to (Northern Ireland) Derry City)
89	GK	BUL	Nikolay Krastev (on loan to Nesebar, previously on loan at Lokomotiv Mezdra)
91	FW	BUL	Ventsislav Hristov (to Neftochimic Burgas)

=== Lokomotiv GO ===
In:

No.	Pos.	Nation	Player
1	GK	BUL	Stefano Kunchev (from (Norway) Egersunds IK)
4	MF	BUL	Nikolay Hristov (from (North Macedonia) Bregalnica Štip)
5	DF	BUL	Martin Kavdanski (from Lokomotiv Plovdiv)
10	FW	BUL	Yanaki Smirnov (on loan from Ludogorets Razgrad)
12	GK	BUL	Ivaylo Saykov (from Oborishte)
14	MF	FRA	Rahavi Kifouéti (from Botev Plovdiv)
18	FW	BUL	Tsvetan Genkov (from (Turkey) Denizlispor)
19	MF	MTQ	Mathias Coureur (from (Georgia (country)) Dinamo Tbilisi)
23	MF	BUL	Vladislav Uzunov (from Dobrudzha Dobrich)
24	DF	GAB	Ulysse Ndong (from (Cyprus) Ermis Aradippou)
27	MF	FRA	Igor Djoman (from Beroe Stara Zagora)
28	MF	TUN	Mohamed Ben Othman (from (Portugal) Leixões)
30	MF	BUL	Dimo Atanasov (from Spartak Pleven)
37	DF	BUL	Ventsislav Kerchev (on loan from Ludogorets Razgrad)
77	MF	BUL	Lyubomir Genchev (from Etar Veliko Tarnovo)
91	GK	BUL	Nikolay Bankov (from Dobrudzha Dobrich)
—	DF	BUL	Nikolay Dichev (from CSKA Sofia)
—	FW	BUL	Viktor Shishkov (from (Greece) Episkopi)
—	FW	BUL	Georgi Karaneychev (from (Kazakhstan) Kaisar)

Out:

No.	Pos.	Nation	Player
1	GK	BUL	Plamen Kolev (to Vereya)
5	MF	BUL	Ivaylo Mihaylov (to Botev Vratsa)
13	MF	BUL	Atanas Dimitrov (to Belasitsa Petrich)
19	FW	TUN	Aymen Souda (to Lokomotiv Plovdiv)
23	DF	BUL	Denislav Mitsakov (to Etar Veliko Tarnovo)
26	DF	BUL	Mariyan Ivanov (released)
33	GK	BUL	Pavel Petkov (to Botev Plovdiv)
39	FW	BUL	Dimitar Aleksiev (to (Italy) Vigor Lamezia)
66	MF	BUL	Antoniy Balakov (released)
71	DF	BUL	Ivo Harizanov (released)
77	FW	BUL	Martin Sandov (to Botev Vratsa)
83	DF	BUL	Ivan Penev (to Botev Vratsa)
87	GK	BUL	Radoslav Rashkov (to Pavlikeni)
91	MF	BUL	Erik Pochanski (to Beroe Stara Zagora)
93	FW	BUL	Dimitar Baydakov (to Lyubimets)
—	DF	BUL	Nikolay Dichev (to Kariana Erden)
—	FW	BUL	Viktor Shishkov (to Bansko)
—	FW	BUL	Georgi Karaneychev (to (Moldova) Dacia Chișinău)

=== Lokomotiv Plovdiv ===
In:

No.	Pos.	Nation	Player
5	DF	BUL	Pavel Vidanov (from (Poland) Górnik Zabrze)
13	MF	BUL	Simeon Raykov (from Cherno More)
14	DF	BUL	Ivan Goranov (from Litex Lovech)
15	DF	BUL	Dimitar Vezalov (from (Poland) Zagłębie Sosnowiec)
23	MF	ESP	Miguel Ángel Luque (from (Catalonia) Manresa)
28	GK	BUL	Ilko Pirgov (from Beroe Stara Zagora)
39	MF	TJK	Parvizdzhon Umarbayev (from (Tajikistan) Istiklol)
44	DF	BUL	Ivaylo Markov (from Slivnishki Geroy)
93	FW	TUN	Aymen Souda (from Lokomotiv GO)
—	GK	BUL	Aleksandar Lyubenov (from Levski Sofia)
—	MF	IRQ	Osama Rashid (from (Portugal) Farense)
—	FW	BUL	Ivan Kolev (from Oborishte)

Out:

No.	Pos.	Nation	Player
3	DF	BUL	Aleksandar Tunchev (retired)
5	DF	BUL	Nikolay Dimitrov (to Oborishte)
12	GK	BUL	Aleksandar Vitanov (to Oborishte)
14	MF	BUL	Aykut Yanukov (on loan to Oborishte)
15	DF	BUL	Ivan Ivanov (to (Greece) Panathinaikos)
23	MF	BUL	Emil Gargorov (to Beroe Stara Zagora)
25	DF	BUL	Krum Stoyanov (to Botev Plovdiv)
55	DF	BUL	Martin Kavdanski (to Lokomotiv GO)
77	MF	BUL	Stefan Velev (to (Georgia (country)) Dinamo Tbilisi)
99	FW	SEN	Mansour Gueye (released)
—	GK	BUL	Aleksandar Lyubenov (on loan to Lokomotiv Sofia)
—	GK	BUL	Mario Raychev (on loan to Rilski Sportist)
—	MF	BUL	Zhak Pehlivanov (on loan to Rilski Sportist)
—	MF	IRQ	Osama Rashid (released)
—	FW	BUL	Ivan Kolev (on loan to Pomorie)

=== Ludogorets Razgrad ===
In:

No.	Pos.	Nation	Player
5	DF	ARG	José Palomino (from (France) Metz)
10	MF	BRA	Gustavo Campanharo (from (Brazil) Bragantino)
32	DF	UKR	Ihor Plastun (from (Ukraine) Karpaty Lviv)

Out:

No.	Pos.	Nation	Player
3	DF	BUL	Teynur Marem (to Dunav Ruse)
16	DF	COL	Brayan Angulo (on loan to (Mexico) Chiapas)
19	MF	BUL	Aleksandar Vasilev (on loan to Beroe Stara Zagora)
30	MF	ROU	Andrei Prepeliță (to (Russia) Rostov)
33	GK	BUL	Georgi Argilashki (on loan to Pirin Blagoevgrad)
37	DF	BUL	Ventsislav Kerchev (on loan to Lokomotiv GO)
71	FW	BUL	Yanaki Smirnov (on loan to Lokomotiv GO)
91	GK	BUL	Ivan Čvorović (to Levski Sofia)

=== Montana ===
In:

No.	Pos.	Nation	Player
2	DF	BUL	Mario Blagoev (Free agent)
4	FW	BRA	Danillo Bala (from (Brazil) Confiança)
5	DF	RUS	Anton Polyutkin (from (Russia) Solyaris Moscow)
6	DF	BUL	Tihomir Trifonov (from Neftochimic Burgas)
7	MF	BUL	Daniel Genov (from Pirin Blagoevgrad)
8	MF	BUL	Georgi Korudzhiev (from (Hungary) Békéscsaba)
11	MF	BUL	Andreas Vasev (from Cherno More)
14	DF	GRE	Christos Kontochristos (from (Greece) AEL)
16	MF	BUL	Steven Petkov (from Beroe Stara Zagora)
19	DF	BUL	Yuliyan Chapaev (from (Germany) RB Leipzig II)
20	MF	BUL	Nikolay Chipev (Free agent)
21	MF	BUL	Ivan Toshev (from Botev Galabovo)
23	DF	BRA	Choco (from (Brazil) AO Itabaiana)
24	MF	BRA	Fernando Silva (from (Portugal) Aves)
25	MF	BUL	Kostadin Dyakov (from Pirin Blagoevgrad)
28	MF	BUL	Marquinhos (from Pirin Blagoevgrad)
29	DF	FRA	Bamba Diarrassouba (from (France) Fréjus Saint-Raphaël)
—	DF	BUL	Denis Pidev (from Vereya)

Out:

No.	Pos.	Nation	Player
4	MF	ALG	Nabil Ejenavi (to Oborishte)
5	DF	BUL	Asen Georgiev (to (Croatia) Istra 1961)
6	DF	BUL	Hristofor Hubchev (to Beroe Stara Zagora)
7	MF	BUL	Ivan Kokonov (to Cherno More)
8	MF	BUL	Ivan Minchev (to CSKA Sofia)
10	FW	BUL	Ivan Stoyanov (to Botev Plovdiv)
15	DF	BUL	Georgi Angelov (to Vereya)
16	MF	BUL	Vladimir Michev (to Levski Karlovo)
17	DF	BUL	Georgi Pashov (to Slavia Sofia)
19	MF	BUL	Tsvetan Varsanov (to Bansko)
24	MF	NIG	Olivier Bonnes (to (South Korea) Gwangju)
25	MF	BUL	Stanislav Genchev (to Etar Veliko Tarnovo)
26	DF	BUL	Yordan Todorov (to (Germany) Neutraubling)
77	FW	BUL	Zdravko Lazarov (to Hebar Pazardzhik)
—	DF	BUL	Denis Pidev (to Lokomotiv Sofia)

=== Neftochimic Burgas ===
In:

No.	Pos.	Nation	Player
1	GK	BUL	Yanko Georgiev (from Pomorie)
2	DF	BUL	Kostadin Velkov (from Lokomotiv 1929 Sofia)
3	DF	BUL	Ivo Malinov (from Sofia 2010)
6	DF	SRB	Marko Ranđelović (from (Serbia) Čukarički)
7	MF	BUL	Ivan Valchanov (from Cherno More)
8	MF	BUL	Nikolay Dyulgerov (from (Italy) Akragas)
11	MF	BUL	Atanas Chipilov (from Bansko)
12	GK	BUL	Stoyan Kolev (from CSKA Sofia)
13	MF	BUL	Yordan Yordanov (from CSKA Sofia)
15	FW	BUL	Zhivko Petkov (from Cherno More)
16	DF	MKD	Bojan Gjorgievski (from (North Macedonia) Horizont Turnovo)
17	MF	BUL	Rumen Rumenov (on loan from CSKA Sofia)
19	MF	BUL	Mihael Orachev (from Pomorie)
20	DF	BUL	Yani Pehlivanov (from Pomorie)
21	MF	BUL	Mariyan Ognyanov (from Botev Plovdiv)
22	MF	BUL	Emanuil Manev (from Sozopol)
24	FW	BUL	Kostadin Hazurov (from CSKA Sofia)
25	DF	BUL	Angel Granchov (from CSKA Sofia)
26	DF	ROU	Sergiu Homei (from (Romania) Academica Clinceni)
32	MF	BUL	Lyubomir Bozhinov (from Pomorie)
89	MF	BUL	Stanislav Malamov (from CSKA Sofia)
91	FW	BUL	Ventsislav Hristov (from Levski Sofia)
—	MF	BUL	Aleksandar Aleksandrov (from CSKA Sofia)
—	MF	BUL	Georgi Chakarov (from Dunav Ruse)
—	FW	CRO	Mario Rašić (from (Austria) Parndorf)

Out:

No.	Pos.	Nation	Player
1	GK	BUL	Petko Patsov (to Sozopol)
2	DF	BUL	Todor Gochev (to Botev Vratsa)
5	DF	BUL	Simeon Ivanov (to Etar Veliko Tarnovo)
7	MF	BUL	Vladislav Misyak (to Lokomotiv Sofia)
8	MF	BUL	Teodor Stefanov (to Levski Karlovo)
9	FW	BUL	Iliya Dimitrov (loan return to Levski Sofia)
10	MF	BUL	Stanislav Dryanov (to Beroe Stara Zagora)
11	MF	BUL	Stefan Nedelchev (to Etar Veliko Tarnovo)
14	DF	BUL	Stoyan Kizhev (to Botev Galabovo)
17	MF	BUL	Stanimir Andonov (to Dobrudzha Dobrich)
18	DF	BUL	Miroslav Koev (to Pomorie)
19	FW	BUL	Ivan Tsachev (to Nesebar)
21	MF	BUL	Daniel Gadzhev (released)
22	DF	BUL	Tihomir Trifonov (to Montana)
23	DF	BUL	Stanislav Zhekov (to Pomorie)
27	DF	BUL	Slavi Shopov (to Pomorie)
32	DF	BUL	Rostislav Petrov (to Pomorie)
44	GK	BUL	Dimitar Iliev (to Pomorie)
77	MF	BUL	Tsvetan Filipov (to Levski Karlovo)
88	FW	BUL	Eray Karadayi (to Nesebar)
90	GK	BUL	Petar Denchev (to Levski Karlovo)
99	MF	BUL	Borislav Borisov (to Sozopol)
—	MF	BUL	Aleksandar Aleksandrov (released)
—	MF	BUL	Georgi Chakarov (released)
—	FW	CRO	Mario Rašić (released)

=== Pirin Blagoevgrad ===
In:

No.	Pos.	Nation	Player
4	DF	SVK	Kristián Koštrna (from (Austria) Parndorf)
6	DF	BUL	Orlin Starokin (from Botev Plovdiv)
8	FW	BUL	Iliya Dimitrov (on loan from Levski Sofia)
9	FW	BUL	Vladislav Zlatinov (from Lokomotiv Mezdra)
10	FW	ALB	Ndue Mujeci (from (Latvia) Ventspils)
19	FW	BUL	Stanislav Kostov (from Beroe Stara Zagora)
26	MF	BUL	Manol Chapov (from Lokomotiv Mezdra)
27	DF	BUL	Kostadin Nichev (from Dobrudzha Dobrich)
29	DF	BRA	Alexandre Hans (from (Brazil) Rio Branco)
33	GK	BUL	Georgi Argilashki (on loan from Ludogorets Razgrad)

Out:

No.	Pos.	Nation	Player
1	GK	BUL	Martin Minev (to Slivnishki Geroy)
5	DF	BUL	Aleksandar Dyulgerov (to CSKA Sofia)
6	MF	BUL	Kostadin Dyakov (to Montana)
8	MF	BUL	Daniel Genov (to Montana)
10	FW	BUL	Martin Toshev (to (Germany) Erzgebirge Aue)
11	MF	BRA	Edenilson Bergonsi (to (Kosovo) Drita)
17	MF	BUL	Iliya Karapetrov (to Etar Veliko Tarnovo)
19	MF	BUL	Blagoy Nakov (to Septemvri Sofia)
20	MF	BUL	Yanko Sandanski (released)
28	MF	BUL	Marquinhos (to Montana)
33	DF	BUL	Emil Viyachki (to Lokomotiv Sofia)

=== Slavia Sofia ===
In:

No.	Pos.	Nation	Player
5	DF	ROU	Alexandru Giurgiu (from (Romania) SC Bacău)
6	DF	BUL	Aleksandar Branekov (from CSKA Sofia)
8	MF	BUL	Bozhidar Vasev (from Botev Plovdiv)
11	DF	BUL	Georgi Pashov (from Montana)
18	FW	RUS	Yevgeni Tyukalov (from (Estonia) Infonet Tallinn)
24	FW	BUL	Valeri Domovchiyski (from (Greece) Levadiakos)
73	MF	BUL	Ivan Minchev (from CSKA Sofia)
77	MF	BUL	Nikolay Dimitrov (from (Greece) Skoda Xanthi)

Out:

No.	Pos.	Nation	Player
2	DF	BUL	Martin Dechev (released)
3	DF	BUL	Dimitar Pirgov (to Levski Sofia)
9	FW	FRA	Donneil Moukanza (to (Cyprus) Aris Limassol)
11	MF	FRA	Daudet N'Dongala (to (Turkey) Balıkesirspor)
24	FW	BUL	Kitan Vasilev (on loan to Vitosha Bistritsa)
25	DF	BUL	Tsvetomir Panov (to Botev Plovdiv)
55	DF	RUS	Nikita Sergeyev (released)
87	DF	BRA	Diego Ferraresso (to (Poland) Cracovia)
99	FW	BUL	Radoslav Vasilev (released)
—	GK	BUL	Diyan Valkov (to Litex Lovech, previously on loan at Vereya)
—	MF	FRA	Jérémy Manzorro (released, previously on loan at (Cyprus) Anorthosis)

=== Vereya ===
In:

No.	Pos.	Nation	Player
1	GK	BUL	Plamen Kolev (from Lokomotiv GO)
3	DF	BUL	Vladimir Zafirov (from Beroe Stara Zagora)
5	DF	BUL	Iliya Munin (from Bansko)
6	DF	FRA	Ilias Hassani (from (France) Bordeaux)
7	MF	BUL	Momchil Tsvetanov (from CSKA Sofia)
8	MF	GUI	Ousmane Baldé (from (Portugal) Olhanense)
10	MF	BRA	Elias (from Beroe Stara Zagora)
11	MF	BUL	Iliyan Yordanov (from (Serbia) Borac Čačak)
12	GK	BUL	Ivan Karadzhov (Free agent)
14	FW	BUL	Georgi Andonov (from Cherno More)
15	DF	BUL	Kostadin Slaev (from Bansko)
25	DF	BUL	Georgi Angelov (from Montana)
26	MF	FRA	Salim Kerkar (from Beroe Stara Zagora)
27	MF	BUL	Svetoslav Dikov (from Slivnishki Geroy)
32	FW	BUL	Vasil Kaloyanov (from Sozopol)
33	DF	BUL	Miroslav Enchev (from Botev Galabovo)
77	DF	POR	Pedro Eugénio (from Cherno More)
—	MF	MDA	Alexandru Pașcenco (from (Moldova) Dinamo-Auto Tiraspol)
—	MF	BUL	Aleksandar Yakimov (from Belasitsa Petrich)
—	FW	FRA	Adama Guidiala (from (France) Bastia)

Out:

No.	Pos.	Nation	Player
2	DF	BUL	Dzhuneyt Ali (to Nesebar)
3	DF	BUL	Zhivko Zhelev (retired)
4	DF	BUL	Plamen Tenev (loan return to Beroe)
5	DF	BUL	Petko Ganev (to Sozopol)
6	MF	BUL	Kiril Lichev (loan return to Beroe)
8	MF	BUL	Milen Mitev (to Tsarsko Selo)
9	MF	BUL	Doncho Atanasov (to Botev Galabovo)
10	MF	BUL	Dzhuneyt Yashar (to Nesebar)
12	GK	BUL	Diyan Valkov (loan return to Slavia Sofia)
14	MF	BUL	Hristian Popov (to (Germany) FCM Schwerin)
15	MF	BUL	Ventsislav Ivanov (released)
18	MF	BUL	Peycho Enchev (to Eurocollege)
19	DF	BUL	Denis Pidev (to Montana)
22	GK	CGO	Christoffer Mafoumbi (to (South Africa) Free State Stars)
45	MF	BUL	Mitko Plahov (to Etar Veliko Tarnovo)
77	DF	BUL	Vasil Botev (to Vereya II)
97	DF	BUL	Hristo Mitev (to Rilski Sportist)
99	FW	BUL	Angel Kostov (to Vereya II)
—	MF	MDA	Alexandru Pașcenco (released)
—	MF	BUL	Aleksandar Yakimov (to Tsarsko Selo)
—	FW	FRA	Adama Guidiala (released)

== Second league ==
=== Bansko ===
In:

No.	Pos.	Nation	Player
1	GK	BUL	Georgi Stavrev (from Chernomorets Balchik)
3	DF	BUL	Ahmed Ademov (from Pirin Gotse Delchev)
4	MF	BUL	Dzheyhan Zaydenov (from Septemvri Simitli)
6	MF	BRA	Eli Marques (from Oborishte)
9	FW	BUL	Viktor Shishkov (from Lokomotiv GO)
11	MF	BUL	Nikolay Hadzhinikolov (from Septemvri Simitli)
12	GK	BUL	Abdi Abdikov (from Levski Karlovo)
13	FW	BUL	Hristiyan Vasilev (from Oborishte)
15	MF	BUL	Tsvetan Varsanov (from Montana)
16	DF	BUL	Murad Ibrahim (from Oborishte)
18	DF	BUL	Mario Dimitrov (from Spartak Pleven)
20	DF	BUL	Kristiyan Mihaylov (from Ludogorets Razgrad II)
22	MF	BUL	Valeri Kulinov (from Strumska Slava)
24	FW	BUL	Angel Dimitrov (from Lokomotiv Sofia U19)
—	MF	BUL	Yordan Yurukov (from Pirin Razlog)

Out:

No.	Pos.	Nation	Player
1	GK	BUL	Mario Atanasov (released)
3	DF	BUL	Kostadin Slaev (to Vereya)
6	DF	BUL	Georgi Kremenliev (to Dunav Ruse)
11	MF	BUL	Atanas Chipilov (to Neftochimic Burgas)
12	GK	BUL	Aleksandar Stoyanov (to Tsarsko Selo)
13	DF	BUL	Blagoy Rodov (released)
15	MF	BUL	Hristo Kirev (to Oborishte)
19	FW	BUL	Andriyan Dimitrov (released)
20	MF	BUL	Antonio Laskov (released)
21	FW	BUL	Borislav Hazurov (to Pirin Gotse Delchev)
22	DF	BUL	Iliya Munin (to Vereya)
23	MF	BUL	Kostadin Katsimerski (to Pirin Razlog)
24	MF	BUL	Lyubomir Vitanov (to Pirin Gotse Delchev)
—	MF	BUL	Yordan Yurukov (retired)

=== Botev Galabovo ===
In:

No.	Pos.	Nation	Player
3	DF	BUL	Stoyan Kizhev (from Neftochimic Burgas)
23	MF	BUL	Dimitar Videv (from Beroe Stara Zagora U19)
32	MF	BUL	Ilian Hristov (from Oborishte)
70	MF	BUL	Doncho Atanasov (from Vereya Stara Zagora)
77	FW	BUL	Ivelin Iliev (on loan from Beroe Stara Zagora)
90	MF	BUL	Ivaylo Angelov (on loan from Beroe Stara Zagora)
92	MF	BUL	Dimitar Traykov (from (Italy) Parma)

Out:

No.	Pos.	Nation	Player
3	DF	BUL	Yanko Valkanov (to Levski Karlovo)
19	FW	BUL	Lyubomir Aleksandrov (released)
23	MF	BUL	Nikola Grozdanov (to Hebar Pazardzhik)
32	DF	BUL	Miroslav Enchev (to Vereya)
92	MF	BUL	Ivan Toshev (to Montana)

=== Botev Vratsa ===
In:

No.	Pos.	Nation	Player
2	DF	BUL	Todor Gochev (from Neftochimic Burgas)
3	DF	BUL	Martin Dimov (from Oborishte)
4	DF	BUL	Georgi Peychev (from Septemvri Simitli)
6	MF	BUL	Dimitar Petkov (from (Cyprus) Elpida Xylofagou)
8	DF	BUL	Martin Sandov (from Lokomotiv GO)
10	MF	BUL	Denis Tsolev (from Lokomotiv Mezdra)
11	MF	BUL	Krasimir Gavazov (from Levski-Rakovski)
13	MF	ARM	Andrey Shahgeldyan (from (Armenia) Banants II)
16	MF	BUL	Kaloyan Tsvetkov (from Oborishte)
18	MF	BUL	Daniel Vasev (from Spartak Pleven)
19	MF	BUL	Ivaylo Mihaylov (from Lokomotiv GO)
22	MF	BUL	Pavel Petkov (Free agent)
23	GK	BUL	Ivaylo Yanachkov (from Oborishte)
24	FW	BUL	Andrian Kraev (from Levski Sofia U19)
39	DF	BUL	Ivan Penev (from Lokomotiv GO)

Out:

No.	Pos.	Nation	Player
—	DF	BUL	Ruslan Kuang (to Bdin Vidin)
—	DF	BUL	Emil Grozev (to Litex Lovech)
—	DF	BUL	Georgi Pavlov (released)
—	DF	BUL	Daniel Genov (to Svetkavitsa Targovishte)
—	DF	BUL	Georgi Ivanov (to Levski Karlovo)
—	MF	BUL	Anatoli Todorov (to Oborishte)
—	MF	BUL	Dilyan Dimitrov (to Litex Lovech)
—	MF	BUL	Deyan Borisov (to Botev Ihtiman)
—	MF	BUL	Nigel Yanislavov (released)
—	MF	BUL	Georgi Vasilev (to Minyor Pernik)
—	MF	BUL	Mihael Paraskov (released)
—	MF	BUL	Lyuboslav Petrov (released)
—	MF	BUL	Milen Vasilev (to (North Macedonia) Pelister)
—	FW	BUL	Viliyan Manolov (released)

=== CSKA Sofia II ===
In:

No.	Pos.	Nation	Player

Out:

No.	Pos.	Nation	Player

=== Etar ===
In:

No.	Pos.	Nation	Player
4	DF	BUL	Denislav Mitsakov (from Lokomotiv GO)
8	MF	BUL	Stanislav Genchev (from Montana)
10	FW	BUL	Tsvetomir Todorov (from Spartak Pleven)
11	MF	BUL	Stefan Nedelchev (from Neftochimic Burgas)
12	GK	BUL	Kiril Akalski (from (Germany) FC Unterföhring)
16	DF	BUL	Galin Tashev (on loan from Levski Sofia)
17	MF	BUL	Chavdar Ivaylov (from Litex Lovech II)
20	FW	ARG	Guido Abayián (from (Gibraltar) Lincoln Red Imps)
21	MF	BUL	Iliya Karapetrov (from Pirin Blagoevgrad)
22	MF	BUL	Nikolay Tsvetkov (from CSKA Sofia)
24	DF	BUL	Simeon Ivanov (from Neftochimic Burgas)
25	MF	BUL	Mitko Plahov (from Vereya)

Out:

No.	Pos.	Nation	Player
3	DF	BUL	Blagovest Angelov (released)
4	MF	BUL	Radoslav Anev (to Pirin Gotse Delchev)
11	FW	BUL	Stefan Hristov (to Spartak Pleven)
13	MF	BUL	Zhulien Benkov (to Spartak Pleven)
15	DF	BUL	Ivaylo Rusev (to Spartak Varna)
16	MF	BUL	Aleksandar Uzunov (released)
18	DF	BUL	Tsvetan Petrov (released)
22	GK	BUL	Emil Mihaylov (to Cherno More)
24	MF	BUL	Radoslav Baychev (to Sevlievo)
77	MF	BUL	Lyubomir Genchev (to Lokomotiv GO)

=== Levski Karlovo ===
In:

No.	Pos.	Nation	Player
1	GK	BUL	Petar Denchev (from Neftochimic Burgas)
4	DF	BUL	Boris Biserov (from Spartak Plovdiv)
5	DF	BUL	Evgeni Tuntev (from Lokomotiv Mezdra)
6	MF	BUL	Radoslav Apostolov (on loan from Botev Plovdiv)
7	MF	BUL	Hristo Yanchev (from Eurocollege)
8	MF	BUL	Teodor Stefanov (from Neftochimic Burgas)
10	FW	BUL	Georgi Stefanov (from Spartak Plovdiv)
11	FW	BUL	Ismet Ramadan (on loan from Botev Plovdiv)
14	DF	BUL	Atanas Kumanov (from Botev Plovdiv U19)
15	FW	GRE	Ilias Ignatidis (from (Hungary) Vasas)
22	DF	BUL	Yanko Valkanov (from Botev Galabovo)
30	MF	BUL	Vladimir Michev (from Montana)
79	DF	BUL	Georgi Ivanov (from Botev Vratsa)
—	DF	BUL	Kostadin Markov (Free agent)
—	DF	BUL	Nikolay Nikolov (from Septemvri Sofia)
—	MF	BUL	Valentin Veselinov (from Chernomorets Balchik)
—	MF	BUL	Tsvetan Filipov (from Neftochimic Burgas)
—	FW	BUL	Andrey Atanasov (from Spartak Plovdiv)

Out:

No.	Pos.	Nation	Player
—	GK	BUL	Abdi Abdikov (to Bansko)
—	DF	BUL	Konstantin Kostov (released)
—	DF	BUL	Petar Vichkov (released)
—	DF	BUL	Ivan Karabobev (released)
—	MF	BUL	Anton Mangurev (to Septemvri Simitli)
—	MF	BUL	Petar Kepov (to Vihren Sandanski)
—	MF	BUL	Nikola Danchev (released)
—	MF	BUL	Martin Gunev (released)
—	MF	BUL	Vasil Stefanov (released)
—	MF	BUL	Filip Lupov (released)
—	FW	BUL	Boyan Penev (to Minyor Radnevo)
—	FW	BUL	Stoyan Stoyanov (released)
—	DF	BUL	Kostadin Markov (released)
—	DF	BUL	Nikolay Nikolov (released)
—	MF	BUL	Valentin Veselinov (released)
—	MF	BUL	Tsvetan Filipov (released)
—	FW	BUL	Andrey Atanasov (released)

=== Lokomotiv Sofia ===
In:

No.	Pos.	Nation	Player
2	DF	BUL	Borislav Nikolov (from Strumska Slava)
3	DF	BUL	Slavi Paskalev (from Partizan Cherven Bryag)
6	DF	BUL	Aleksandar Goranov (from Sozopol)
7	MF	BUL	Daniel Peev (from (Kazakhstan) Spartak Semey)
8	MF	BUL	Bogomil Hristov (Free agent)
9	FW	BUL	Dimitar Georgiev (from Pirin Razlog)
15	MF	BUL	Vladislav Misyak (from Neftochimic Burgas)
17	MF	GRE	Giorgos Bouzoukis (from (Greece) Veria)
18	MF	BUL	Zlatko Bonev (from Lokomotiv Mezdra)
19	MF	BUL	Viliyan Komitski (from (Scotland) Stirling University)
20	DF	GRE	Anestis Chatziliadis (from (Greece) Chania)
23	DF	BUL	Emil Viyachki (from Pirin Blagoevgrad)
24	GK	BUL	Aleksandar Lyubenov (on loan from Lokomotiv Plovdiv)
25	DF	BUL	Denis Pidev (from Montana)
—	GK	BUL	Emil Petrov (from Pirin Razlog)

Out:

No.	Pos.	Nation	Player
2	DF	BUL	Kostadin Velkov (to Neftochimic Burgas)
3	DF	BUL	Valeri Drandev (released)
4	DF	BUL	Vasil Vakadinov (released)
6	MF	BUL	Anton Slavchev (to Spartak Pleven)
8	MF	BUL	Kristiyan Velichkov (to Botev Ihtiman)
9	FW	BUL	Rosen Yordanov (released)
15	MF	BUL	Sibil Karagyozov (to Pirin Razlog)
17	MF	BUL	Nikolay Velkov (to Spartak Pleven)
18	MF	BUL	Kaloyan Karadzhinov (retired)
19	DF	SRB	Darko Savić (retired)
20	DF	BUL	Valentin Udev (released)
24	MF	BUL	Ivan Gogov (released)
26	MF	BUL	Vasil Dimitrov (released)
—	GK	BUL	Emil Petrov (released)

=== Ludogorets Razgrad II ===
In:

No.	Pos.	Nation	Player
14	MF	BUL	Slavcho Shokolarov (Free agent)
23	FW	BUL	Georgi Netov (from Oborishte)
71	DF	BUL	Petar Alyoshev (from Oborishte)
73	DF	BUL	Kristiyan Dimitrov (from Dobrudzha Dobrich)

Out:

No.	Pos.	Nation	Player
39	DF	BUL	Kristiyan Mihaylov (to Bansko)
51	DF	BUL	Aleksandar Georgiev (released, previously on loan to Karnobat)
72	DF	BUL	Kristian Dzhamov (to Hebar Pazardzhik)
95	MF	BUL	Borimir Karamfilov (to Oborishte)

=== Nesebar ===
In:

No.	Pos.	Nation	Player
1	GK	BUL	Nikolay Krastev (on loan from Levski Sofia)
2	DF	BUL	Dzhuneyt Ali (from Vereya)
5	DF	BUL	Plamen Tenev (on loan from Beroe Stara Zagora)
17	FW	BUL	Ivan Tsachev (from Neftochimic Burgas)
19	FW	BUL	Eray Karadayi (from Neftochimic Burgas)
20	MF	BUL	Dzhuneyt Yashar (from Vereya)
28	MF	BUL	Rangel Ignatov (on loan from Botev Plovdiv)
32	FW	BUL	Vladislav Mirchev (from Spartak Varna)

Out:

No.	Pos.	Nation	Player
4	MF	BUL	Lyubomir Petrov (released)
14	FW	BUL	Petko Stoyanov (released)
15	MF	BUL	Dimitar Kolarov (to Tsarsko Selo)
19	FW	BUL	Aleksandar Argirov (released)
20	MF	BUL	Zhivko Dimov (to Karnobat)
32	FW	BUL	Trayo Grozev (to (Malta) Kerċem Ajax)

=== Oborishte ===
In:

No.	Pos.	Nation	Player
3	DF	GRE	Lazaros Fotias (from (Greece) Panegialios)
7	MF	BUL	Kiril Lichev (on loan from Beroe Stara Zagora)
8	MF	BUL	Svilen Shterev (from Gigant Saedinenie)
9	MF	BUL	Borimir Karamfilov (from Ludogorets Razgrad II)
10	MF	BUL	Vladimir Aytov (from Dobrudzha Dobrich)
11	MF	BUL	Aykut Yanukov (from Lokomotiv Plovdiv)
13	MF	ALG	Nabil Ejenavi (from Montana)
14	DF	BUL	Nikolay Parnarov (from Dunav Ruse)
15	FW	BUL	Anatoli Todorov (from Botev Vratsa)
16	FW	BUL	Vasil Tachev (from Chernomorets Balchik)
17	MF	BUL	Hristo Kirev (from Bansko)
18	DF	BUL	Stoyan Georgiev (from Lokomotiv Mezdra)
19	FW	FRA	Taylor Salibur (from (France) Marck)
24	DF	BUL	Iliyan Garov (from Spartak Pleven)
27	DF	BUL	Nikolay Dimitrov (from Lokomotiv Plovdiv)
73	GK	BUL	Aleksandar Vitanov (from Lokomotiv Plovdiv)
80	FW	BUL	Emil Kamberov (on loan from Botev Plovdiv)

Out:

No.	Pos.	Nation	Player
1	GK	BUL	Ivaylo Yanachkov (to Botev Vratsa)
2	DF	BUL	Petar Alyoshev (to Ludogorets Razgrad II)
3	DF	BUL	Martin Dimov (to Botev Vratsa)
4	DF	BUL	Ivan Ivanov (to Dobrudzha Dobrich)
8	FW	BUL	Ivan Kolev (to Lokomotiv Plovdiv)
9	MF	BUL	Ilian Hristov (to Botev Galabovo)
10	MF	BUL	Shaban Osmanov (to Borislav Parvomay)
11	FW	BUL	Georgi Netov (to Ludogorets Razgrad II)
12	GK	BUL	Ivaylo Saykov (to Lokomotiv GO)
13	DF	BUL	Nikola Ivanov (released)
16	MF	BUL	Kaloyan Tsvetkov (to Botev Vratsa)
17	DF	BUL	Ivaylo Dimitrov (released)
18	MF	BUL	Vladimir Baharov (to Tsarsko Selo)
19	FW	BUL	Dimitar Dimitrov (to Germanea Sapareva Banya)
20	MF	ENG	Andrew Musungu (released)
21	DF	BUL	Murad Ibrahim (to Bansko)
28	MF	BRA	Eli Marques (to Bansko)
77	FW	BUL	Hristiyan Vasilev (to Bansko)
88	GK	BUL	Ventsislav Dimitrov (to Lyubimets)
90	MF	BUL	Antonio Tsankov (to Pirin Gotse Delchev)
99	MF	BUL	Nikolay Kuzmanov (released)

=== Pomorie ===
In:

No.	Pos.	Nation	Player
1	GK	BUL	Dimitar Iliev (from Neftochimic Burgas)
3	DF	BUL	Martin Vasilev (Free agent)
4	DF	BUL	Rostislav Petrov (from Neftochimic Burgas)
13	DF	BUL	Miroslav Koev (from Neftochimic Burgas)
15	MF	BUL	Martin Ivanov (from Neftochimic Burgas U19)
19	MF	GHA	Michael Tawiah (from Lokomotiv Mezdra)
20	MF	BUL	Iliyan Sherdenov (from Sozopol)
21	MF	BUL	Bekir Rasim (from Cherno More)
23	DF	BUL	Stanislav Zhekov (from Neftochimic Burgas)
24	MF	BUL	Hristiyan Kazakov (from Dobrudzha Dobrich)
25	DF	BUL	Slavi Shopov (from Neftochimic Burgas)
26	FW	BUL	Ivan Kolev (on loan from Lokomotiv Plovdiv)
—	MF	BUL	Nikola Mitsanski (from Spartak Pleven)

Out:

No.	Pos.	Nation	Player
1	GK	BUL	Yanko Georgiev (to Neftochimic Burgas)
4	DF	BUL	Diyan Lefterov (to Karnobat)
9	FW	BUL	Aleko Hristov (released)
10	MF	BUL	Lyubomir Bozhinov (to Neftochimic Burgas)
18	DF	BUL	Aleksandar Ivanov (released)
19	MF	BUL	Mihael Orachev (to Neftochimic Burgas)
23	DF	BUL	Dimitar Popov (released)
26	DF	BUL	Yani Pehlivanov (to Neftochimic Burgas)
—	MF	BUL	Nikola Mitsanski (to Spartak Pleven)

=== Septemvri Sofia ===
In:

No.	Pos.	Nation	Player
1	GK	BUL	Valentin Galev (from Botev Plovdiv)
3	DF	BUL	Georgi Kupenov (on loan from Botev Plovdiv)
9	MF	BUL	Asen Chandarov (from Botev Plovdiv)
21	MF	BUL	Blagoy Nakov (from Pirin Blagoevgrad)
24	DF	BUL	Bogomil Dyakov (from Spartak Pleven)

Out:

No.	Pos.	Nation	Player
2	MF	BUL	Lachezar Kotev (to Vitosha Bistritsa)
3	MF	BUL	Stefan Mitev (to Dunav Ruse)
5	DF	BUL	Nikolay Nikolov (to Levski Karlovo)
8	FW	BUL	Valentin Slivov (to Borislav Parvomay)
9	FW	BUL	Antonio Pavlov (released)
14	MF	CIV	Yaya Meledje (to Botev Plovdiv)

=== Sozopol ===
In:

No.	Pos.	Nation	Player
1	GK	BUL	Petko Patsov (from Neftochimic Burgas)
5	DF	BUL	Petko Ganev (from Vereya)
6	MF	BUL	Kristiyan Peshov (from CSKA Sofia U19)
8	MF	BUL	Antoni Ivanov (Free agent)
18	FW	BUL	Deyan Hristov (from Septemvri Simitli)
24	MF	BUL	Zhivko Komelov (from Neftochimic Burgas U19)
25	DF	BUL	Ivan Stoyanov (from Chernomorets Burgas)
93	DF	BUL	Hristo Kaymakanski (from Chernomorets Burgas)
96	MF	BUL	Borislav Borisov (from Neftochimic Burgas)

Out:

No.	Pos.	Nation	Player
1	GK	BUL	Stanimir Minchev (to Vihar Aytos)
4	DF	BUL	Aleksandar Goranov (to Lokomotiv Sofia)
8	MF	BUL	Iliyan Sherdenov (to Pomorie)
12	MF	BUL	Emanuil Manev (to Neftochimic Burgas)
24	MF	BUL	Rostislav Yankov (to Chernomorets 1919 Burgas)
25	MF	BUL	Iliyan Kapitanov (to Chernomorets Balchik)
32	FW	BUL	Vasil Kaloyanov (to Vereya)

=== Spartak Pleven ===
In:

No.	Pos.	Nation	Player
2	MF	BUL	Emil Petrov (on loan from CSKA Sofia)
4	FW	BUL	Rangel Abushev (from (Russia) Sibir Novosibirsk)
6	MF	BUL	Anton Slavchev (from Lokomotiv Sofia)
7	FW	BUL	Vladimir Kaptiev (from Septemvri Simitli)
9	FW	BUL	Stefan Hristov (from Etar Veliko Tarnovo)
10	MF	GHA	Kevin Osei (Free agent)
11	MF	BUL	Kiril Valov (from Partizan Cherven Bryag)
12	FW	BUL	Kristiyan Dimitrov (from (Switzerland) Champagne Sports)
13	DF	BRA	Brendo (from (Brazil) Colo Colo)
17	MF	BUL	Nikolay Velkov (from Lokomotiv Sofia)
19	MF	FRA	Chris Gadi (from (Portugal) Atlético CP)
20	DF	BUL	Martin Mitov (from Litex Lovech II)
30	MF	BUL	Nikola Mitsanski (from Pomorie)
94	GK	BUL	Teodor Todorov (from Beroe U19)
94	GK	BUL	Marin Orlinov (from Litex Lovech)
—	GK	BUL	Zlati Zlatev (from Cherno More U19)
—	DF	BUL	Dimitar Michkov (from Maritsa Plovdiv)
—	DF	BUL	Tsvetan Karakolev (from (Switzerland) Champagne Sports)
—	MF	BUL	Zhulien Benkov (from Etar Veliko Tarnovo)
—	FW	BUL	Lyubomir Todorov (Free agent)
—	FW	BUL	Spas Spasov (from Rilski Sportist)

Out:

No.	Pos.	Nation	Player
2	DF	BUL	Mario Dimitrov (to Bansko)
3	DF	BUL	Teodor Mihaylov (to Akademik Svishtov)
4	DF	BUL	Iliyan Garov (to Oborishte)
7	MF	BUL	Daniel Vasev (to Botev Vratsa)
8	MF	BUL	Ivo Ivanov (released)
10	FW	BUL	Tsvetomir Todorov (to Etar Veliko Tarnovo)
11	MF	BUL	Ivaylo Dangurov (to Akademik Svishtov)
14	DF	BUL	Daniel Gergov (to Akademik Svishtov)
16	MF	BUL	Martin Bakalov (released)
19	DF	BUL	Bogomil Dyakov (to Septemvri Sofia)
21	MF	BUL	Kristiyan Ivanov (released)
22	MF	BUL	Viktor Ivanov (released)
30	MF	BUL	Dimo Atanasov (to Lokomotiv GO)
89	GK	BUL	Hristo Matev (released)
—	GK	BUL	Zlati Zlatev (to Dobrudzha Dobrich)
—	DF	BUL	Dimitar Michkov (released)
—	DF	BUL	Tsvetan Karakolev (released)
—	MF	BUL	Zhulien Benkov (released)
—	FW	BUL	Lyubomir Todorov (released)
—	FW	BUL	Spas Spasov (released)

=== Tsarsko Selo ===
In:

No.	Pos.	Nation	Player
2	DF	BUL	Georgi Kremenliev (on loan from Dunav Ruse)
3	DF	BUL	Evgeni Zyumbyulev (from Strumska Slava)
4	DF	BUL	Milen Mitev (from Vereya)
5	DF	BUL	Lyubomir Gutsev (from Septemvri Simitli)
11	MF	BUL	Aleksandar Yakimov (from Vereya)
12	GK	BUL	Aleksandar Stoyanov (from Bansko)
13	MF	NGA	Salas Okechukwu (from Botev Ihtiman)
14	MF	BUL	Antonio Hadzhiivanov (from Lokomotiv Mezdra)
16	FW	BUL	Aykut Ramadan (on loan from CSKA Sofia)
17	MF	BUL	Reyan Daskalov (from Litex Lovech II)
18	MF	BUL	Vladimir Baharov (from Oborishte)
20	DF	BUL	Galin Minkov (from Litex Lovech II)
23	MF	BUL	Dimitar Kolarov (from Nesebar)

Out:

No.	Pos.	Nation	Player
—	GK	BUL	Boyan Peykov (released)
—	DF	BUL	Toni Stoichkov (to Sevlievo)
—	DF	BUL	Ivo Malinov (to Neftochimic Burgas)
—	DF	BUL	Nikolay Velichkov (released)
—	DF	BUL	David Stoyanov (to CSKA 1948)
—	MF	BUL	Radi Staykov (released)
—	MF	BUL	Hristo Bangeev (released)
—	MF	BUL	Vlado Ivanov (released)
—	MF	BUL	Miroslav Todorov (released)
—	MF	BUL	Tsvetomir Valeriev (released)
—	MF	BUL	Nikolay Petrov (released)
—	MF	BUL	Aleksandar Dimitrov (to Velbazhd Kyustendil)
—	FW	BUL	Kristiyan Petrov (to Hebar Pazardzhik)

=== Vitosha Bistritsa ===
In:

No.	Pos.	Nation	Player
1	GK	BUL	Hristiyan Vasilev (from Yantra Gabrovo)
2	MF	BUL	Lachezar Kotev (from Septemvri Sofia)
11	FW	BUL	Kitan Vasilev (on loan from Slavia Sofia)
23	FW	BUL	Boris Tyutyukov (on loan from Botev Plovdiv)
25	FW	NGA	Paul Otofe (from Shumen 1929)
88	MF	BUL	Ivaylo Lazarov (from Chernomorets Balchik)

Out:

No.	Pos.	Nation	Player
11	FW	BUL	Dimitar Vodenicharov (released)
—	GK	BUL	Mihail Ivanov (to (Italy) Robur Siena)
—	DF	BUL	Nikolay Velichkov (released)
—	MF	BUL	Tomi Kostadinov (to Pirin Gotse Delchev)
—	FW	BUL	Stoyan Georgiev (to Strumska Slava)
