= 2010 Bulgarian Cup final =

- Event: 2009–10 Bulgarian Cup
Chernomorets Pomorie	Beroe
B PFG	A PFG
0	1
- Date: 5 May 2010
- Venue: Gradski Stadium, Lovech
- Man of the Match: Doncho Atanasov
- Referee: Nikolay Yordanov
- Attendance: 5,250

The 2010 Bulgarian Cup final was played at the Lovech Stadium in Lovech on 5 May 2010, and was contested by Beroe Stara Zagora and Chernomorets Pomorie. The match was won by Beroe Stara Zagora, with Doncho Atanasov scoring the crucial goal in the 92nd minute.

== Match ==
=== Details ===
5 May 2010
18:00

Chernomorets Pomorie	0–1	Beroe Stara Zagora
		D. Atanasov 90+2'

Gradski Stadium, Lovech
Attendance: 5,250
Referee: Nikolay Yordanov (Sofia)

Chernomorets	Beroe

Chernomorets:
GK	1	(Bulgaria) Yanko Georgiev
DF	2	(Bulgaria) Kostadin Velkov
DF	18	(Bulgaria) Miroslav Koev
DF	22	(Bulgaria) Malin Orachev (c)
DF	25	(Bulgaria) Plamen Dimov
MF	14	(Bulgaria) Emanuil Manev
MF	17	(Bulgaria) Georgi Chakarov (substituted off) 89'
MF	8	(Bulgaria) Georgi Kostadinov (yellow card) 63'
MF	10	(Bulgaria) Stanimir Mitev
MF	11	(Bulgaria) Tsvetan Filipov (substituted off) 90'
FW	20	(Bulgaria) Yani Pehlivanov
Substitutes:
GK	12	(Bulgaria) Plamen Kolev
MF	3	(Bulgaria) Georgi Kaloyanov
DF	4	(Bulgaria) Venelin Filipov (substituted in) 90'
FW	9	(Bulgaria) Zhivko Petkov
FW	19	(Bulgaria) Galin Dimov (substituted in) 89'
MF	21	(Bulgaria) Krum Stoyanov
DF	31	(Bulgaria) Radoslav Staykov
Manager:
(Bulgaria) Petar Houbchev Assistant referees: (Bulgaria) Nikola Djuganski (Bulgaria) Kiril Manolov; Fourth official: (Bulgaria) Anatoli Donchev

Beroe:
GK	22	(Bulgaria) Boyan Peykov
DF	2	(Bulgaria) Zdravko Iliev
DF	24	(Bulgaria) Stanislav Bachev
DF	28	(Bulgaria) Atanas Atanasov (substituted off) 46'
DF	5	(Bulgaria) Ivo Ivanov
MF	13	(Bulgaria) Dian Genchev (substituted off) 71'
MF	7	(Bulgaria) Slavi Zhekov (c)
MF	18	(Bulgaria) Petar Kostadinov
FW	17	(Bulgaria) Iskren Pisarov
FW	77	(Bulgaria) Georgi Andonov
FW	11	(Bulgaria) Doncho Atanasov
Substitutes:
GK	33	(Bulgaria) Teodor Skorchev
DF	3	(Bulgaria) Todor Todorov (substituted in) 46'
MF	6	(Bulgaria) Georgi Bozhanov
MF	20	(Bulgaria) Nikolay Stankov (substituted in) 71'
MF	21	(Bulgaria) Milen Tanev
FW	27	(Bulgaria) Atanas Apostolov
MF	29	(Bulgaria) Simeon Minchev
Manager:
(Bulgaria) Ilian Iliev

== See also ==
- 2009–10 A Group
