= Vladimir Kaptiev =

Bulgarian footballer

Personal information
- Full name: Vladimir Nikolov Kaptiev
- Date of birth: 14 July 1987 (age 39)
- Place of birth: Satovcha, Bulgaria
- Height: 1.82 m (6 ft 0 in)
- Position: Forward

Team information
- Current team: Kostinbrod
- Number: 18

Senior career*
Years	Team	Apps	(Gls)
2005–2006	Pirin Blagoevgrad	?	(?)
2006–2007	Balkan Botevgrad	?	(?)
2007	Spartak Pleven	2	(0)
2008–2010	Dunav Ruse	65	(13)
2011	Cherno More	7	(1)
2011	Botev Kozloduy	8	(2)
2012	Spartak Varna	5	(0)
2013	Dunav Ruse	10	(2)
2014	Oborishte	13	(11)
2014	Pirin Razlog	15	(8)
2015	Oborishte	23	(11)
2016	Septemvri Simitli	13	(3)
2016–2017	Spartak Pleven	16	(2)
2017	Kariana	11	(3)
2018	Makedonikos	?	(?)
2018	Oborishte	15	(1)
2019	Septemvri Simitli	12	(7)
2019–2020	Sportist Svoge	16	(6)
2020–2021	Botev Ihtiman	7	(3)
2021–2022	Kostinbrod	12	(6)
2022–2023	Oborishte	4	(1)
2023–	Kostinbrod	4	(0)
- * Club domestic league appearances and goals as of 1 August 2020

Vladimir Kaptiev (Bulgarian: Владимир Каптиев; born 14 July 1987) is a Bulgarian footballer who plays as a forward for Kostinbrod. He is the younger brother of Rosen Kaptiev.

== Career ==
Vladimir had previously played for Pirin Blagoevgrad, Balkan Botevgrad, Spartak Pleven, Dunav Ruse, Cherno More Varna, Botev Kozloduy, Spartak Varna and Oborishte.

In July 2017, Kaptiev joined Kariana Erden. In July 2018, he returned to Oborishte.
