= Rangel Ignatov =

Bulgarian footballer

Personal information
- Full name: Rangel Georgiev Ignatov
- Date of birth: 6 April 1997 (age 29)
- Place of birth: Plovdiv, Bulgaria
- Height: 1.78 m (5 ft 10 in)
- Positions: Winger; attacking midfielder

Team information
- Current team: Botev Ihtiman
- Number: 77

Youth career
- Maritsa Plovdiv
- Eurocollege Plovdiv
- Vekta Plovdiv
- Botev Plovdiv

Senior career*
Years	Team	Apps	(Gls)
2015–2016	Botev Plovdiv	0	(0)
2016	→ Pirin Razlog (loan)	3	(0)
2016	→ Nesebar (loan)	2	(0)
2017–2018	Maritsa Plovdiv	41	(13)
2018–2019	Botev Galabovo	20	(1)
2019–2020	Oborishte	8	(2)
2020	Sportist Svoge	5	(0)
2020–	Botev Ihtiman	10	(1)

International career
2014–	Bulgaria U19	6	(2)
- * Club domestic league appearances and goals as of 10 November 2021

Rangel Ignatov (Bulgarian: Рангел Игнатов; born 6 April 1997) is a Bulgarian footballer who plays as a winger or attacking midfielder for Botev Ihtiman.

== Club career ==
=== Botev Plovdiv ===
==== Youth squads ====
Rangel Ignatov was part of Botev Plovdiv U17 and U19 squads. He won the U19 national championship in 2015 and even scored a goal in the final.

==== First team ====
Rangel Ignatov was included in the first team squad for the pre-season training during the winter break of season 2015–16. He participated in several friendly games and scored a goal in the 4–1 win over Poli Timișoara. He was released on 22 February 2017.

==== Pirin Razlog (loan) ====
On 17 February 2016 Ignatov was loaned to Pirin Razlog until the end of the season in B Grupa. Rangel made a debut on 28 February during the goalless draw with Litex Lovech. On 12 March, he came on as a substitute during the 0–1 away win over FC Sozopol and got seriously injured, which kept him out of action until the end of the season. Ignatov will miss the other games until the end of the season due to dislocated shoulder.

=== Maritsa Plovdiv ===
On 22 February 2017, immediately after his contract termination with Botev Plovdiv, Ignatov joined his boyhood club Maritsa Plovdiv.

=== Botev Galabovo ===
At the end of the 2017–18 season, following Maritsa's relegation to Third League, Ignatov signed with Botev Galabovo.

== International career ==
Ignatov has earned several caps for the Bulgarian U18 and U19 team.

On 3 January 2015 Ignatov came on a substitute and scored a goal for the 2–0 win over Kazakhstan U19. On the next day, on 4 January 2015, he played in the 0–1 defeat from Slovenia U19. Three days later, on 7 January 2015, Ignatov scored a goal for the 2–0 win over Lithuania U19. He also participated in the 1–1 draw with Latvia U19 and 0–3 defeat from Japan U19.

On 24 February 2016, Ignatov came on as a second-half substitute in the friendly game with Serbia U19 which was lost with 0–2.
