= Murad Ibrahim =

Murad Ibrahim may refer to:

- Al-Hajj Murad Ebrahim (born 1948), Filipino Islamist
- Murad Ibrahim (footballer) (born 1987), Bulgarian footballer
