= Diyan Valkov =

Bulgarian footballer (born 1993)

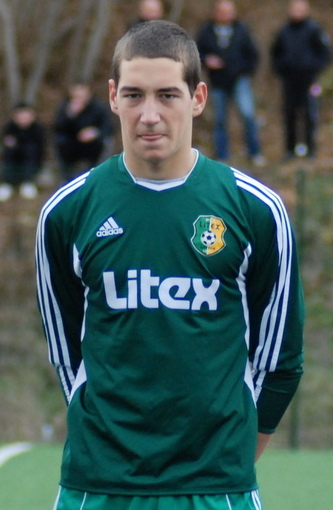
- Valkov in 2009

Personal information
- Full name: Diyan Tsvetozarov Valkov
- Date of birth: 13 September 1993 (age 33)
- Place of birth: Pleven, Bulgaria
- Height: 1.90 m (6 ft 3 in)
- Position: Goalkeeper

Team information
- Current team: Sayana Haskovo
- Number: 1

Youth career
- Spartak Pleven
- Litex Lovech
- Slavia Sofia

Senior career*
| Years | Team | Apps | (Gls) |
| 2010–2016 | Slavia Sofia | 0 | (0) |
| 2012–2013 | → Lyubimets 2007 (loan) | 21 | (0) |
| 2015 | → Pirin Razlog (loan) | 12 | (0) |
| 2015–2016 | → Vereya (loan) | 26 | (0) |
| 2016–2018 | Litex Lovech | 57 | (0) |
| 2018–2019 | CSKA 1948 | 12 | (0) |
| 2019 | Botev Galabovo | 11 | (0) |
| 2020 | Lokomotiv GO | 4 | (0) |
| 2020 | Vitosha Bistritsa | 5 | (0) |
| 2020–2021 | Levski Lom | 31 | (0) |
| 2021–2023 | Levski Karlovo | 11 | (0) |
| 2023– | Sayana Haskovo | 0 | (0) |
- * Club domestic league appearances and goals

Diyan Valkov (Bulgarian: Диян Вълков; born 13 September 1993) is a Bulgarian footballer who plays as a goalkeeper for Sayana Haskovo.

== Career ==
In August 2016, Valkov joined Litex. He left the club in June 2018.

On 28 June 2018, Valkov signed with CSKA 1948.
