= Georgi Ivanov (footballer, born 1980) =

Bulgarian footballer

Personal information
- Full name: Georgi Dimitrov Ivanov
- Date of birth: 13 March 1980 (age 46)
- Place of birth: Madan, Bulgaria
- Height: 1.88 m (6 ft 2 in)
- Positions: Centre back; defensive midfielder

Team information
- Current team: Oborishte (Player/Manager)

Senior career*
Years	Team	Apps	(Gls)
2002–2005	Botev Plovdiv	29	(0)
2005–2007	Maritsa Plovdiv	52	(0)
2007–2008	Belite orli	18	(3)
2008–2011	Montana	47	(4)
2012	Vidima-Rakovski	2	(0)
2012	Svilengrad 1921	14	(0)
2013–2015	Oborishte	60	(5)
2015–2016	Botev Vratsa	24	(4)
2016–2017	Levski Karlovo	12	(0)
2017	Hebar Pazardzhik	5	(0)
2020–	Oborishte	0	(0)

Managerial career
- 2020–: Oborishte (Player/Manager)
- * Club domestic league appearances and goals as of 31 May 2017

Georgi Ivanov (Bulgarian: Георги Иванов; born 13 March 1980 in Madan) is a Bulgarian footballer who plays as a defender for Hebar Pazardzhik.
