= Petar Lazarov =

Bulgarian footballer

Personal information
- Full name: Petar Ivanov Lazarov
- Date of birth: 27 August 1985 (age 41)
- Place of birth: Plovdiv, Bulgaria
- Height: 1.79 m (5 ft 10 in)
- Position: Midfielder

Team information
- Current team: Pirin Razlog
- Number: 8

Senior career*
Years	Team	Apps	(Gls)
2006–2008	Sportist Svoge	39	(3)
2008–2009	Lokomotiv Plovdiv	4	(0)
2009–2010	Spartak Plovdiv	11	(1)
2010–2013	Pirin Gotse Delchev	104	(11)
2014	Montana	9	(0)
2014	Chernomorets Burgas	15	(0)
2015	Pirin Gotse Delchev	13	(0)
2015	Pirin Razlog	16	(1)
2016–2019	Bansko	108	(8)
2020–	Pirin Razlog	0	(0)
- * Club domestic league appearances and goals as of 1 February 2020

Petar Lazarov (Bulgarian: Петър Лазаров; born 23 November 1985) is a Bulgarian footballer, currently playing as a midfielder for Pirin Razlog.
