= Valentin Veselinov =

Bulgarian footballer

Personal information
- Full name: Valentin Yulianov Veselinov
- Date of birth: 15 June 1992 (age 34)
- Place of birth: Bulgaria
- Height: 1.76 m (5 ft 9 in)
- Position: Midfielder

Senior career*
Years	Team	Apps	(Gls)
2009–2011	Sliven 2000	35	(4)
2012	Botev Plovdiv	2	(0)
2012	Dunav Ruse	–	(–)
2013	Etar 1924	2	(0)
2013	Lyubimets 2007	5	(0)
2014	Spartak Varna	12	(0)
2014	Trikala	–	(–)
2015	Dobrudzha Dobrich	12	(0)
2015–2016	Chernomorets Balchik	22	(3)
2016	Levski Karlovo	3	(0)
2017–2018	Chernomorets Balchik	29	(1)
2018–2019	Spartak Varna	31	(14)
- * Club domestic league appearances and goals as of 10 September 2019

Valentin Veselinov (Bulgarian: Валентин Веселинов; born 15 June 1992) is a Bulgarian footballer who plays as a midfielder.

== Career ==
Veselinov is a product of Sliven's youth system. He made his debut during the 2009–10 season on 25 March 2010 in a 0–1 away loss against Litex Lovech, coming on as a substitute for Nikolay Dimitrov.

In February 2012, Veselinov joined Botev Plovdiv.

In February 2017, after a short stint at Levski Karlovo, Veselinov returned to Chernomorets Balchik.
