= Baharov =

Baharov or Bakharov (Bulgarian: Бахъров) is a Bulgarian masculine surname, its feminine counterpart is Baharova or Bakharova. Notable people with the surname include:

- Vladimir Baharov (born 1992), Bulgarian footballer
- Zachary Baharov (born 1980), Bulgarian actor
