= Ivelin =

Ivelin is a given name. Notable people with the name include:

- Ivelin Giro, Cuban American actress
- Ivelin Iliev, Bulgarian footballer
- Ivelin Kostov, Bulgarian footballer
- Ivelin Mihaylov, Bulgarian politician
- Ivelin Popov, Bulgarian footballer
- Ivelin Yanev, Bulgarian footballer
