= Deyan Borisov =

Bulgarian footballer

Personal information
- Full name: Deyan Valentinov Borisov
- Date of birth: 1 March 1989 (age 37)
- Place of birth: Bulgaria
- Height: 1.76 m (5 ft 9 in)
- Position: Midfielder

Team information
- Current team: Sportist Svoge
- Number: 14

Senior career*
Years	Team	Apps	(Gls)
2007–2012	Sportist Svoge	109	(15)
2013	Oborishte	14	(3)
2013	Sportist Svoge		
2014–2015	Oborishte	28	(6)
2015–2016	Botev Vratsa	26	(2)
2016–2017	Botev Ihtiman		
2017–	Sportist Svoge		
- * Club domestic league appearances and goals as of 7 July 2019

Deyan Borisov (Bulgarian: Деян Борисов; born 1 March 1989) is a Bulgarian footballer currently playing as a midfielder for Sportist Svoge.
