= Georgi Stefanov =

Bulgarian footballer

Personal information
- Full name: Georgi Robertov Stefanov
- Date of birth: 13 July 1988 (age 38)
- Place of birth: Plovdiv, Bulgaria
- Height: 1.85 m (6 ft 1 in)
- Position: Forward

Youth career
- 1998–2004: Maritsa Plovdiv
- 2004–2006: Litex Lovech

Senior career*
Years	Team	Apps	(Gls)
2006–2009	Litex Lovech	0	(0)
2006–2007	→ Spartak Pleven (loan)	10	(6)
2007–2009	→ Belite Orli (loan)	20	(12)
2009–2011	Maritsa Plovdiv	23	(12)
2011	Botev Plovdiv	16	(10)
2012	Rakovski	?	(?)
2012–2013	Lokomotiv Plovdiv	36	(3)
2014	Lyubimets 2007	13	(1)
2014	Lokomotiv Plovdiv	3	(0)
2015	Vereya	12	(2)
2015	Maritsa Plovdiv	11	(1)
2016	Spartak Plovdiv	14	(9)
2016	Levski Karlovo	16	(3)
2017	Oborishte	8	(1)
2017–2018	Arda		
2018–2020	Oborishte		
2020	Spartak Plovdiv		
2020–2023	Atletik Kuklen		
2023	Levski Karlovo		
- * Club domestic league appearances and goals

Georgi Stefanov (Bulgarian: Георги Стефанов; born 13 July 1988, in Plovdiv) is a Bulgarian footballer who plays as a forward for Oborishte.

== Career ==
In August 2017, Stefanov joined Arda Kardzhali. He was released at the end of the season.

In July 2018, Stefanov returned to Oborishte.
