= Emil Kamberov =

Bulgarian footballer

Personal information
- Date of birth: 7 April 1996 (age 30)
- Place of birth: Plovdiv, Bulgaria
- Height: 1.83 m (6 ft 0 in)
- Position: Midfielder

Youth career
- Botev Plovdiv

Senior career*
Years	Team	Apps	(Gls)
2013–2017	Botev Plovdiv	2	(0)
2013	→ Rakovski (loan)	8	(0)
2015	→ Lokomotiv GO (loan)	4	(0)
2016	→ Oborishte (loan)	15	(3)
Total		29	(3)
- * Club domestic league appearances and goals as of 7 January 2017

Emil Kamberov (Bulgarian: Емил Камберов; born 7 April 1996) is a Bulgarian footballer, who plays as midfielder.

== Career ==
Kamberov spent a couple of short spells on loan at POFC Rakovski and FC Lokomotiv Gorna Oryahovitsa.

On 30 June 2015, Kamberov won the Bulgarian U19 cup with Botev Plovdiv and scored a goal in the final game against Lokomotiv Sofia.

On 7 January 2016, Kamberov returned to Botev Plovdiv. On 23 January he scored a goal during the 4–1 win in a friendly game over ACS Poli Timișoara.

On 16 April 2016, Kamberov made his A Group debut. He came on as a substitute during the 2–2 home draw against Montana. On 23 April he came on as a substitute again during the 2–2 draw with PFC Pirin Blagoevgrad.
