= Petar Hubchev =

Bulgarian footballer and manager

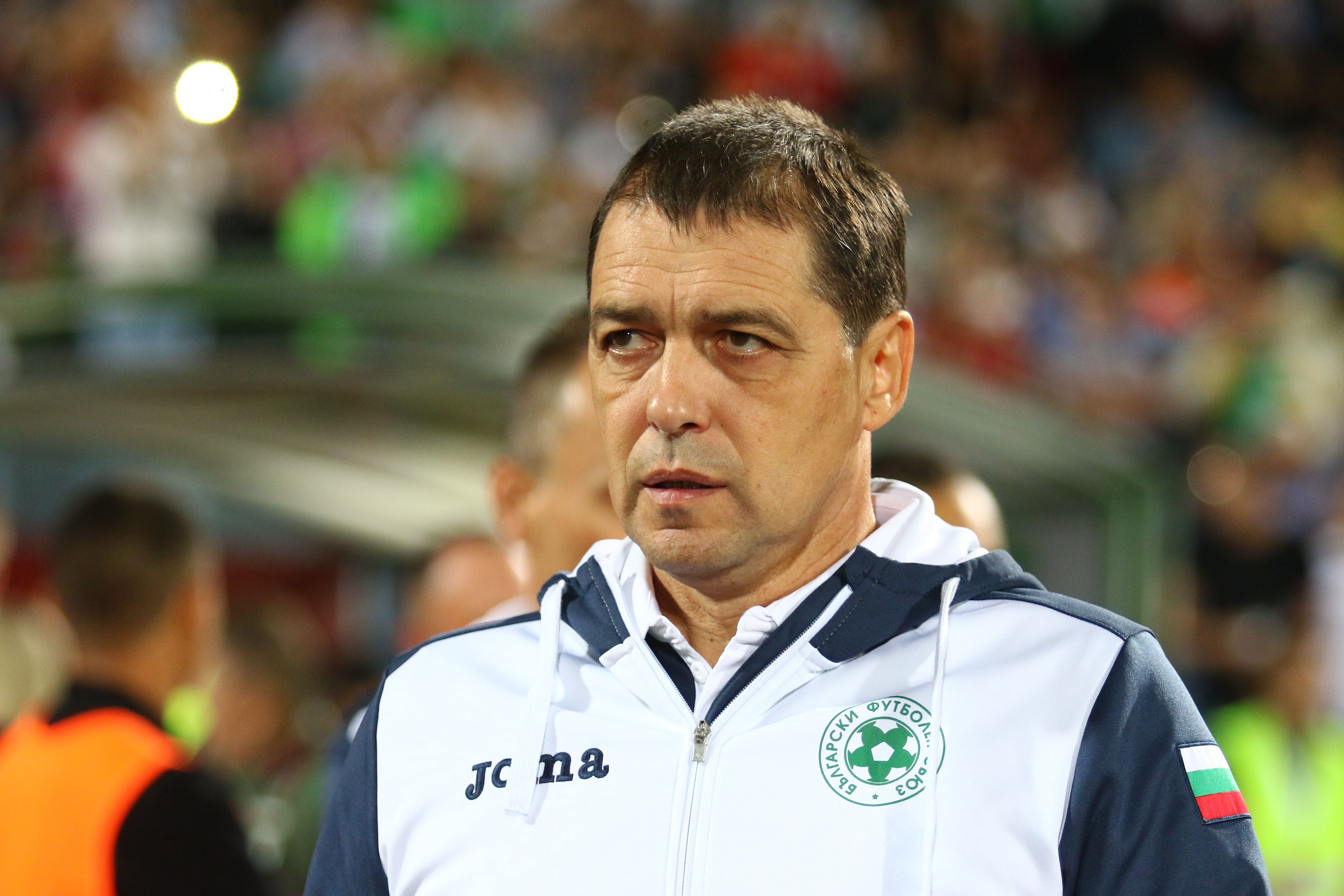
- Hubchev in 2017

Personal information
- Full name: Petar Kanchev Hubchev
- Date of birth: 26 February 1964 (age 62)
- Place of birth: Glozhene, Bulgaria
- Height: 1.85 m (6 ft 1 in)
- Position: Sweeper

Senior career*
Years	Team	Apps	(Gls)
1981–1989	Osam Lovech	249	(26)
1989–1993	Levski Sofia	125	(5)
1993–1996	Hamburger SV	65	(2)
1996–2001	Eintracht Frankfurt	107	(2)
Total		546	(35)

International career
1984–1996	Bulgaria	35	(0)

Managerial career
- 2002: Eintracht Frankfurt (assistant)
- 2003–2004: Bulgaria (assistant)
- 2004: FV Bad Vilbel
- 2005: Slavia Sofia
- 2005–2007: Eintracht Frankfurt II
- 2008–2009: VfL Wolfsburg II
- 2009–2011: Chernomorets Pomorie
- 2011: Botev Plovdiv
- 2012–2016: Beroe Stara Zagora
- 2016−2019: Bulgaria
- 2019−2020: Levski Sofia
- 2022: Beroe Stara Zagora
- * Club domestic league appearances and goals

Petar Kanchev Hubchev (Bulgarian: Петър Кънчев Хубчев; born 26 February 1964) is a Bulgarian football manager and former player who played for Hamburger SV and Eintracht Frankfurt in the German Bundesliga. Considered one of the greatest defenders in the Bulgarian football history, he was an integral part of the Bulgarian squad that reached the semi-finals of the 1994 World Cup and also played at the Euro 1996.

== Career ==
Born in the village of Glozhene, Lovech Province, Hubchev initially began his career as a centre-back at Osam Lovech and being called up for the national team while still playing in the B Group. He made his debut for the Bulgaria national team on 25 April 1984 in a match against Greece. Hubchev was subsequently bought by Levski Sofia in 1989 after 249 matches for Osam. He stayed until 1994, winning two domestic titles and two national cups. His success during the 1994 World Cup led him to a move to German club Hamburger SV, a team which he captained for a brief period. He then played for Eintracht Frankfurt until 2001, where he finished his professional career at the age of 38 and continued as an assistant manager and reserves manager, having played 128 matches and scored two goals in the German Bundesliga, as well as 44 matches in the 2. Bundesliga with another two goals.

== Coaching and managerial career ==
In 2003, Hubchev became the assistant manager of the Bulgaria national team under head coach Plamen Markov, as he helped Bulgaria qualify for the Euro 2004. He continued afterwards as an assistant manager under new Bulgaria national team manager Hristo Stoichkov, and also briefly worked as a Slavia Sofia manager in 2005. After his career as an assistant coach of the national team of Bulgaria, Houbtchev successfully worked as the head coach of the Eintracht Frankfurt U-23 formation in Germany, reaching promotion for the Regionalliga with the “Eagles”. Following his successful stay at Eintracht Frankfurt, Houbtchev was hired by the former Stuttgart, Bayern Munich and Fulham manager Felix Magath to take the wheel of the VfL Wolfsburg U23 formation. Houbtchev managed to gain a very prolific experience during his command in Wolfsburg, as he collaborated with one of the best German coaches. From the summer of 2009 he went on to manage Chernomorets Pomorie, a feeder club of Chernomorets Burgas at the time in the Bulgarian B Group. Hubchev managed the team to a surprise appearance in the 2010 Bulgarian Cup Final by eliminating Minyor Pernik with 2–0 in the quarter-final and Kaliakra Kavarna (4–1 after penalties) respectively. Chernomorets Pomorie players were the second ones from a B Group side in the Bulgarian Cup history to appear in the final of the competition since Chernomorets Burgas' similar achievement in 1989. Chernomorets Pomorie lost the final 0–1 against Beroe Stara Zagora after conceding a late goal just before extra time was to commence. In 2011, he was appointed as a manager of Botev Plovdiv. Under his management, Botev recorded only one defeat in 10 games. He left Botev however, as a result of internal differences among club officials.

In February 2012, he was appointed as a sports director at Beroe Stara Zagora. In October 2012, Hubchev was announced as the new head coach of Beroe Stara Zagora. The very same season he guided the team to a Bulgarian Cup triumph against Levski Sofia in the final, combined with a Super Cup brace against domestic title holders Ludogorets Razgrad. In the follow-up 2014–15 A Group, he also led Beroe Stara Zagora to a historic second place in the final league ranking, mostly by securing crucial wins at home against title contenders Levski Sofia and CSKA Sofia, alongside Lokomotiv Sofia and Slavia Sofia. Beroe Stara Zagora also avoided losing against these four in the away league matches in Sofia respectively. Hubchev was released from his duties in April 2016, following a 0–2 home loss against CSKA Sofia in a first leg Bulgarian Cup semi-final match, with the management of the club proclaiming him to be the most successful manager Beroe Stara Zagora has had in the club's history. In October 2016 Houbtchev was appointed the new head coach of the Bulgaria national football team. Under his command the Bulgaria national team put up one of their best performances in recent years, beating the Netherlands 2–0 as well as Sweden 3–2 in Sofia for the 2018 World Cup Qualification. As for the Nations League, Bulgaria were drawn in Euro Cup Nations League C qualifying group 3 with Norway, Slovenia and Cyprus.

Bulgaria opened up the campaign well, with an impressive 2-1 win over Slovenia and an even more astounding 1-0 shutout win over Norway coached by Lars Lagerbäck. Bulgaria also managed to beat Cyprus 2-1 in Sofia, thereby earning 9 points out of the first three games. Bulgaria eventually closed out the second round of games with two 1-1 draws against Slovenia and Cyprus. This ultimately resulted in securing two important playoff games for the 2020 UEFA Euro qualification against Hungary and the winner between Iceland/Romania. Owing to his achievements as the head coach of the Bulgaria national team Petar Houbtchev was voted Coach of the Year in 2018 by local media representatives. During his spell, the Bulgaria national team managed to achieve several decent wins against prominent and strong sides such as Sweden, Netherlands, Norway, Slovenia, Saudi Arabia, Belarus, Kazakhstan and Cyprus, securing an average of 1.45 points per match.

After his successful tenure at the Bulgaria national team he was appointed as the new head coach of Levski Sofia in June 2019, with the team under his guidance being defensively very solid, and quick on transitions. In January 2022 he returned to Beroe Stara Zagora. Under Hubchev, the team first managed to avoid relegation and furthermore qualified for the UEFA Conference League play-off, that was narrowly lost against Botev Plovdiv.

== Managerial statistics ==
As of match played 1 August 2019

Team	From	To	Record				
Team	From	To	G	W	D	L	
Bulgaria (assistant)	1 June 2003	1 October 2004	–	–	–	–	
(Germany) FV Bad Vilbel	-	-	7	5	0	2	71.43
(Bulgaria) Slavia Sofia	1 August 2005	1 December 2005	–	–	–	–	
(Germany) Eintracht Frankfurt II	15 December 2005	13 December 2007	68	29	17	22	42.65
(Germany) VfL Wolfsburg II	4 January 2008	1 January 2009	17	2	3	12	11.76
(Bulgaria) Chernomorets Pomorie	31 July 2009	1 May 2011	–	–	–	–	
(Bulgaria) Botev Plovdiv	16 May 2011	26 October 2011	9	3	5	1	33.33
(Bulgaria) Beroe Stara Zagora	1 February 2012	7 April 2016	139	68	36	35	48.92
Bulgaria	28 September 2016	14 May 2019	20	8	5	7	40.00
(Bulgaria) Levski Sofia	10 June 2019	11 June 2020	33	17	8	8	51.52
Total			260	116	64	80	44.62

== Honours ==
=== As player ===
Levski Sofia

- A Group: 1992–93, 1993–94
- Bulgarian Cup: 1991–92, 1993–94

=== As manager ===
Chernomorets Pomorie

- Bulgarian Cup runners-up: 2009–10

Beroe Stara Zagora

- A Group runners-up: 2014–15
- Bulgarian Cup: 2012–13
- Bulgarian Supercup: 2013

=== Individual ===
- Bulgarian Coach of the Year 2018: winner
- Bulgarian Coach of the Year 2019: runner-up
- Bulgarian Footballer of the Year 1992: runner-up
- Trifov Ivanov Lionheart Award 2023
