= Kaloyan Tsvetkov =

Bulgarian footballer

Personal information
- Full name: Kaloyan Plamenov Tsvetkov
- Date of birth: 21 October 1988 (age 38)
- Place of birth: Bulgaria
- Height: 1.81 m (5 ft 11 in)
- Position: Midfielder

Team information
- Current team: Bdin Vidin

Senior career*
| Years | Team | Apps | (Gls) |
| 2007–2009 | Bdin Vidin | | |
| 2009–2010 | Botev Vratsa | 9 | (0) |
| 2010–2011 | Bdin Vidin | 31 | (3) |
| 2012 | Svetkavitsa | 14 | (0) |
| 2012–2013 | Bdin Vidin | | |
| 2014–2015 | Botev Vratsa | 33 | (2) |
| 2015–2016 | Oborishte | 28 | (2) |
| 2016 | Botev Vratsa | 17 | (0) |
| 2017– | Bdin Vidin | 0 | (0) |
- * Club domestic league appearances and goals as of 23 January 2017

Kaloyan Tsvetkov (Bulgarian: Калоян Цветков; born 21 October 1988) is a Bulgarian footballer who plays as a midfielder for Bdin Vidin.
