= Aykut Yanukov =

Bulgarian footballer

Aykut Yanаkov
Personal information
- Full name: Aykut Aydun Yanаkov
- Date of birth: 8 April 1995 (age 31)
- Place of birth: Plovdiv, Bulgaria
- Height: 1.82 m (6 ft 0 in)
- Position: Winger

Team information
- Current team: Maritsa
- Number: 77

Youth career
- Lokomotiv Plovdiv

Senior career*
Years	Team	Apps	(Gls)
2014–2017	Lokomotiv Plovdiv	15	(0)
2016–2017	→ Oborishte (loan)	8	(1)
2017–2018	Achaiki	?	(?)
2018–2019	Maritsa	29	(7)
2019–2021	Lokomotiv GO	9	(0)
2021–	Maritsa	48	(1)
- * Club domestic league appearances and goals as of 5 June 2023

Aykut Aydun Yanukov (Bulgarian: Айкут Айдън Янъков; born 8 April 1995) is a Bulgarian footballer who plays as a winger for Maritsa.

== Career ==
Yanukov began his career in his hometown club Lokomotiv Plovdiv but left the team in September 2017.

In June 2018, he joined Maritsa Plovdiv.

== Club statistics ==
As of 29 May 2016

Club	Season	League			Cup		Europe		Total	
Club	Season	Division	Apps	Goals	Apps	Goals	Apps	Goals	Apps	Goals
Lokomotiv Plovdiv	2013–14	A Group	4	0	0	0	–		4	0
Lokomotiv Plovdiv	2014–15	A Group	3	0	2	0	–		5	0
Lokomotiv Plovdiv	2015–16	A Group	8	0	0	0	–		8	0
Career total			15	0	2	0	0	0	17	0
