= Murad Ibrahim (footballer) =

Bulgarian footballer

Personal information
- Full name: Murad Ibrahim Ibrahim
- Date of birth: 11 June 1987 (age 39)
- Place of birth: Bulgaria
- Height: 1.76 m (5 ft 9 in)
- Position: Defender

Team information
- Current team: Rodopa Smolyan

Senior career*
Years	Team	Apps	(Gls)
2005–2010	Spartak Plovdiv	110	(1)
2010	Montana	0	(0)
2011–2012	Lyubimets	20	(0)
2013–2015	Pirin GD	47	(4)
2015–2016	Oborishte	11	(1)
2016–2017	Bansko	13	(0)
2017–2018	Hebar	33	(0)
2018	Oborishte	11	(0)
2019–2021	Sozopol	9	(0)
2021–	Rodopa Smolyan	?	(?)
- * Club domestic league appearances and goals as of 1 December 2021

Murad Ibrahim (Bulgarian: Мурад Ибрахим; born 11 June 1987) is a former professional Bulgarian footballer who competed primarily in Bulgarian football. Over the course of his career, he made 72 appearances in league and cup competitions, including the efbet Liga, Vtora Liga, and the Bulgarian Cup.

Ibrahim represented several Bulgarian clubs, among them Pirin Gotse Delchev, Lyubimets, Oborishte, Bansko, Sozopol, Montana, and Spartak Plovdiv 1947. His most sustained period came with Pirin Gotse Delchev during the 2013–14 season, when he featured in both the top division and the relegation group, as well as in domestic cup matches. Across his recorded senior career, Ibrahim accumulated 5,440 minutes of competitive football, scoring two goals—one in the Vtora Liga and one in the Bulgarian Cup.
