= Mario Dimitrov =

Bulgarian footballer

Mario Dimitrov (Bulgarian: Марио Димитров; born 25 October 1994, in Pernik) is a Bulgarian footballer who plays as a defender for FC Bansko.

== Club career ==
On 9 August 2016, Dimitrov joined Bansko as free agent after his contract with Spartak Pleven has expired. He was released in December.
