= Aleksandar Stoyanov =

Bulgarian footballer

Personal information
- Full name: Aleksandar Ventsislavov Stoyanov
- Date of birth: 25 July 1986 (age 40)
- Place of birth: Sofia, Bulgaria
- Height: 1.82 m (5 ft 11 1/2 in)
- Position: Goalkeeper

Youth career
- CSKA Sofia

Senior career*
Years	Team	Apps	(Gls)
2006–2008	Etar 1924	31	(0)
2009–2011	Sportist Svoge	23	(0)
2011–2016	Bansko	51	(0)
2016	Tsarsko Selo	11	(0)
- * Club domestic league appearances and goals as of 19:09, 13 December 2016 (UTC)

Aleksandar Stoyanov (Bulgarian: Александър Стоянов; born 25 July 1986) is a Bulgarian footballer who plays as a goalkeeper.

== Career ==
Stoyanov began his football career with the CSKA Sofia youth team. At the age of 19, he signed his first professional contract with Etar 1924 Veliko Tarnovo. After spending two and a half years with Etar, Stoyanov transferred to Sportist Svoge in February 2009, conceding only five goals in 9 matches up to the end of the season. In the play-off for promotion in the top division against Naftex Burgas, he played a central role in the 6-4 penalty kick victory, saving the first attempt.
