= Vladimir Baharov =

Bulgarian footballer

Personal information
- Full name: Vladimir Atanasov Baharov
- Date of birth: 23 January 1992 (age 34)
- Place of birth: Ruse, Bulgaria
- Height: 1.71 m (5 ft 7 in)
- Position: Midfielder

Team information
- Current team: Botev Ihtiman
- Number: 23

Youth career
- CSKA Sofia

Senior career*
Years	Team	Apps	(Gls)
2009–2013	CSKA Sofia	1	(0)
2011–2012	→ Akademik Sofia (loan)	21	(2)
2012–2013	→ Neftochimic 1986 (loan)	1	(0)
2013	Slivnishki geroi	13	(1)
2014	Dunav Ruse	9	(0)
2014–2015	Vitosha Bistritsa	25	(1)
2015–2016	Oborishte	29	(1)
2016	Tsarsko Selo	5	(0)
2017	Minyor Pernik	11	(1)
2017–2018	Botev Ihtiman	34	(3)
2019	Oborishte	10	(2)
2019–2022	Botev Ihtiman	15	(1)
2022	Kostinbrod		
2022–	Botev Ihtiman		
- * Club domestic league appearances and goals as of 1 August 2020

Vladimir Atanasov Baharov (Bulgarian: Владимир Атанасов Бахаров; born 23 January 1992) is a Bulgarian footballer who plays as a midfielder for Botev Ihtiman. Baharov also plays competitive futsal.
