= Ismet Ramadan =

Bulgarian footballer

Personal information
- Date of birth: 18 March 1998 (age 28)
- Place of birth: Pazardzhik, Bulgaria
- Height: 1.71 m (5 ft 7 in)
- Position: Striker

Youth career
- Benkovski Byala
- Chavdar Etropole
- Botev Plovdiv

Senior career*
Years	Team	Apps	(Gls)
2016–2017	Botev Plovdiv	2	(0)
2016	→ Levski Karlovo (loan)	13	(0)
2017–2018	TSV Rothwesten	14	(0)

International career
2013	Bulgaria U17	3	(0)
- * Club domestic league appearances and goals as of 1 January 2019

Ismet Ramadan (Bulgarian: Исмет Рамадан; born 18 Март 1998) is a Bulgarian footballer who lately played as a striker for TSV Rothwesten.

== Career ==
=== Botev Plovdiv ===
Ramadan bеgan his youth career in Benkovski Byala and Chavdar Etropole before moving to Botev Plovdiv. On 14 May 2016 he made his debut for the team in A Group in a match against Cherno More Varna. Ramadan left the club in July 2017.

== Career statistics ==
=== Club ===
As of 14 May 2016

Club performance			League		Cup		Continental		Other		Total	
Club	League	Season	Apps	Goals	Apps	Goals	Apps	Goals	Apps	Goals	Apps	Goals
Bulgaria			League		Bulgarian Cup		Europe		Other (Note: Includes Bulgarian Supercup matches.)		Total	
Botev Plovdiv	A Group	2015–16	1	0	0	0	0 (Note: UEFA Europa League matches.)	0	–		1	0
Botev Plovdiv	Total		1	0	0	0	0	0	0	0	1	0
Career statistics			1	0	0	0	0	0	0	0	1	0
