= Emil Petrov =

Bulgarian footballer

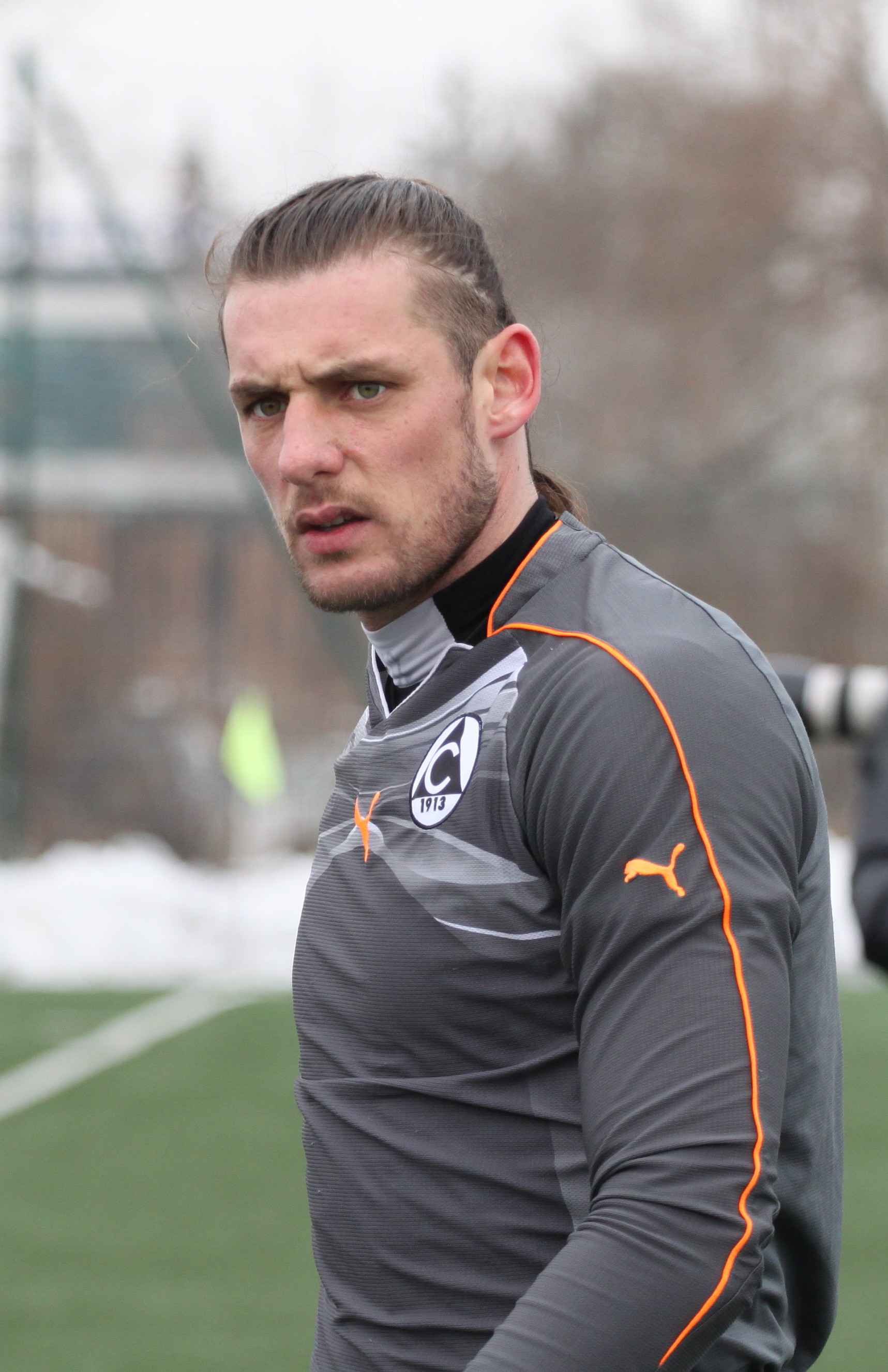

Personal information
- Full name: Emil Stankov Petrov
- Date of birth: 22 July 1983 (age 43)
- Place of birth: Samokov, Bulgaria
- Height: 1.84 m (6 ft 0 in)
- Position: Goalkeeper

Senior career*
Years	Team	Apps	(Gls)
2000–2001	Rilski Sportist	11	(0)
2001–2015	Slavia Sofia	77	(0)
2005–2006	→ Spartak Pleven (loan)	12	(0)
2015	Septemvri Sofia	15	(0)
2016	Pirin Razlog	5	(0)
2016	Lokomotiv Sofia	4	(0)
2017–2019	Balkan Botevgrad		

International career
2003–2004	Bulgaria U21	7	(0)
- * Club domestic league appearances and goals

Emil Stankov Petrov (Bulgarian: Емил Станков Петров; born 22 July 1983, in Samokov) is a retired Bulgarian football goalkeeper.
