= Denis Pidev =

Bulgarian footballer

Personal information
- Full name: Denis Velinov Pidev
- Date of birth: 1 December 1992 (age 33)
- Place of birth: Bobov Dol, Bulgaria
- Height: 1.75 m (5 ft 9 in)
- Position: Left back

Senior career*
Years	Team	Apps	(Gls)
2012–2013	Chavdar Etropole	7	(0)
2013–2014	Marek Dupnitsa	30	(0)
2015–2016	Vereya	33	(0)
2016	Montana	0	(0)
2016–2017	Lokomotiv Sofia	11	(0)
2017	CSKA 1948	10	(0)
- * Club domestic league appearances and goals as of 3 January 2018

Denis Pidev (Bulgarian: Денис Пидев; born 1 December 1992) is a Bulgarian footballer who plays as a defender.

== Career ==
On 8 July 2017, Pidev joined Third League club CSKA 1948.

== Career statistics ==
=== Club ===
As of 18 January 2016

Club performance			League		Cup		Continental		Other		Total	
Club	League	Season	Apps	Goals	Apps	Goals	Apps	Goals	Apps	Goals	Apps	Goals
Bulgaria			League		Bulgarian Cup		Europe		Other (Note: Includes Bulgarian Supercup matches.)		Total	
Chavdar Etropole	B Group	2012–13	7	0	1	0	–		–		8	0
Chavdar Etropole	Total		7	0	1	0	0	0	0	0	8	0
Marek Dupnitsa	B Group	2013–14	24	0	2	0	–		–		26	0
Marek Dupnitsa	A Group	2014–15	6	0	1	0	–		–		7	0
Marek Dupnitsa	Total		30	0	3	0	0	0	0	0	33	0
Vereya Stara Zagora	B Group	2014–15	12	0	0	0	–		–		12	0
Vereya Stara Zagora	B Group	2015–16	12	0	1	0	–		–		13	0
Vereya Stara Zagora	Total		24	0	1	0	0	0	0	0	25	0
Career statistics			61	0	5	0	0	0	0	0	67	0
