= Venelin Filipov =

Bulgarian footballer

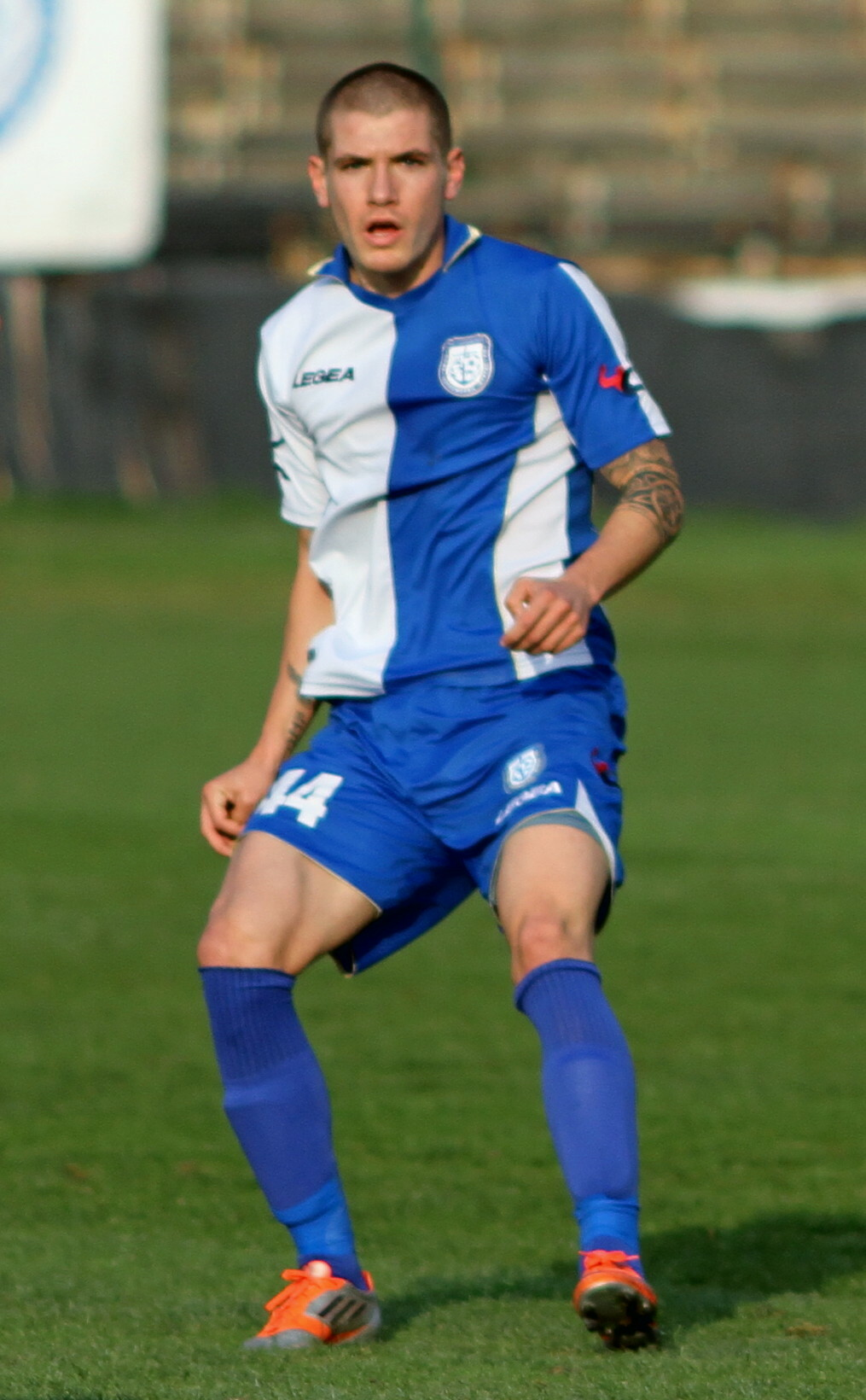

Personal information
- Full name: Venelin Angelov Filipov
- Date of birth: 20 August 1990 (age 36)
- Place of birth: Burgas, Bulgaria
- Height: 1.77 m (5 ft 10 in)
- Position: Right back

Team information
- Current team: Sozopol
- Number: 14

Youth career
- Etar

Senior career*
Years	Team	Apps	(Gls)
2009–2010	Chernomorets Pomorie	29	(1)
2010–2014	Chernomorets Burgas	76	(1)
2014–2015	Lokomotiv Plovdiv	22	(0)
2015	Beroe	9	(0)
2016–2017	Voluntari	51	(0)
2018	Etar	4	(0)
2018–2019	Žalgiris	16	(0)
2020	Slavia Sofia	5	(0)
2020–2021	Etar	7	(0)
2021–	Sozopol	7	(0)

International career
2011	Bulgaria U21	1	(0)
- * Club domestic league appearances and goals as of 20 December 2021 (UTC)

Venelin Filipov (Bulgarian: Венелин Филипов; born 20 August 1990) is a Bulgarian footballer who played as a defender for Sozopol. His brother, Tsvetan Filipov, is also a footballer.

== Career ==
On 28 February 2018, Filipov signed with Etar Veliko Tarnovo for 1 1/2 years. He was released after the end of the 2017–18 season. After the 2019 season he left Žalgiris. In February 2020, Filipov joined Slavia Sofia on a contract running for two seasons.

On 4 January 2021, Filipov returned to Etar where he played until the end of the season.

== Honours ==
FC Voluntari

- Romanian Cup: 2016–17

Žalgiris

- Lithuanian Cup: 2018
