= Mario Rašić =

Croatian footballer

Personal information
- Date of birth: 20 May 1989 (age 37)
- Place of birth: Zagreb, SFR Yugoslavia
- Height: 1.80 m (5 ft 11 in)
- Position: Forward

Team information
- Current team: Bistra

Senior career*
Years	Team	Apps	(Gls)
2007–2009	Inter Zaprešić	24	(1)
2010	Vrapče		
2011–2014	Hrvatski Dragovoljac	57	(7)
2014–2016	Parndorf	36	(12)
2016	Neftochimic Burgas	2	(0)
2017	HNK Gorica	9	(1)
2017	UFC Markt Allhau	15	(14)
2018–2019	Fürstenfeld	20	(9)
2019	Stegersbach	17	(18)
2020–2021	Bistra		
2021	Trofaiach	11	(12)
2022	Straden	7	(4)
2022–	Bistra		
- * Club domestic league appearances and goals as of 9 November 2022

Mario Rašić (born 20 May 1989) is a Croatian professional footballer who plays as a forward for Bistra.

He had spells with several clubs in Austria.
