= Erik Pochanski =

Bulgarian footballer

Personal information
- Full name: Erik Rumenov Pochanski
- Date of birth: 5 April 1992 (age 34)
- Place of birth: Brashten, Bulgaria
- Height: 1.74 m (5 ft 9 in)
- Position: Winger

Team information
- Current team: Chernolomets Popovo
- Number: 8

Youth career
- Chavdar Etropole

Senior career*
Years	Team	Apps	(Gls)
2010–2013	Chavdar Etropole	52	(9)
2013–2015	Montana	42	(8)
2015	Ludogorets II	15	(2)
2016	Lokomotiv GO	15	(3)
2016–2017	Beroe	28	(5)
2017–2019	Etar	38	(6)
2019–2020	Neftochimic	16	(3)
2020–2021	Dobrudzha	22	(2)
2021	Yantra Gabrovo	6	(0)
2022	Sevlievo	13	(5)
2022–2023	Sozopol	14	(0)
2023–	Chernolomets Popovo	0	(0)

International career
2010	Bulgaria U19	5	(1)
2013	Bulgaria U21	6	(2)
- * Club domestic league appearances and goals as of 10 January 2023

Erik Pochanski (Bulgarian: Ерик Почански; born 5 April 1992) is a Bulgarian footballer who plays as a midfielder for Chernolomets Popovo.

== Career ==
=== Early career ===
Pochanski started his career in Chavdar Etropole in 2010 and moved to Montana in 2013. In June 2015 Pochanski signed a pre-contract with Dunav Ruse, but latеly the same month moved to Ludogorets Razgrad II. In the beginning of 2016 he moved to another B Group team Lokomotiv GO.

=== Beroe ===
On 10 June 2016 Pochanski moved to Beroe Stara Zagora. He made his debut for the team on 31 June 2016 in a match for Europa League First qualifying round against FK Radnik Bijeljina. On 7 July he scored both goals for a 2:0 win which qualified Beroe to a further round.

On 18 July 2017, Pochanski's contract was terminated by mutual consent.

=== Etar ===
On 20 July 2017, Pochanski signed with Etar Veliko Tarnovo.

== Career statistics ==
=== Club ===
As of 7 May 2018

Club performance			League		Cup		Continental		Other		Total	
Club	League	Season	Apps	Goals	Apps	Goals	Apps	Goals	Apps	Goals	Apps	Goals
Bulgaria			League (Note: Includes play-off matches, where applicable.)		Bulgarian Cup		Europe		Other (Note: Includes Bulgarian Supercup matches.)		Total	
Chavdar Etropole	2010–11	B Group	16	1	0	0	–		–		16	1
Chavdar Etropole	2011–12	B Group	13	0	0	0	–		–		13	1
Chavdar Etropole	2012–13	B Group	24	3	2	0	–		–		26	3
Chavdar Etropole	Total		53	5	2	0	0	0	0	0	53	5
Montana	2013–14	B Group	26	5	3	0	–		–		26	5
Montana	2014–15	B Group	15	5	3	0	–		–		15	2
Montana	Total		41	8	6	0	0	0	0	0	41	8
Ludogorets Razgrad II	2015–16	B Group	15	3	–		–		–		15	3
Lokomotiv GO	2015–16	B Group	13	3	0	0	–		–		13	3
Beroe Stara Zagora	2016–17	Parva Liga	21	2	1	0	4	2	–		25	4
Beroe Stara Zagora	2017–18	Parva Liga	1	0	0	0	–		–		1	0
Etar Veliko Tarnovo	2017–18	Parva Liga	35	4	3	0	–		–		21	4
Career statistics			178	25	12	0	4	2	0	0	178	25
