= Tsvetan Filipov =

Bulgarian footballer

Personal information
- Full name: Tsvetan Angelov Filipov
- Date of birth: 28 August 1988 (age 38)
- Place of birth: Burgas, Bulgaria
- Height: 1.81 m (5 ft 11 in)
- Position: Midfielder

Team information
- Current team: Neftochimic
- Number: 21

Youth career
- Naftex Burgas

Senior career*
Years	Team	Apps	(Gls)
2005–2009	Naftex Burgas	42	(1)
2005–2006	→ Pomorie (loan)	14	(0)
2009–2010	Chernomorets Pomorie	37	(12)
2011–2012	Beroe	6	(0)
2011–2012	→ Kaliakra (loan)	22	(1)
2012	Edirnespor	10	(7)
2013–2015	Wisła Puławy	41	(1)
2015	Weston-super-Mare	8	(1)
2016	Neftochimic	12	(2)
2016	Levski Karlovo	3	(0)
2017–	Neftochimic	71	(19)
- * Club domestic league appearances and goals as of 15 December 2019

Tsvetan Filipov (Bulgarian: Цветан Филипов; born 28 August 1988) is a Bulgarian footballer who plays as a midfielder for Neftochimic Burgas.

== Career ==
Product of Naftex's youth system, Filipov's first professional appearance was as a 17-year-old for Pomorie, where he was loaned for the 2005–06 season. His brother Venelin is also footballer.

He joined Weston-super-Mare A.F.C. ahead of the 2015 season, but his arrival was delayed until September due to international clearance. He scored one goal for the club before leaving by mutual consent in November 2015.

In June 2017, Filipov joined Neftochimic Burgas.

== Club statistics ==
As of 20 July 2019

Club	Season	League		Cup		Europe		Total	
Club	Season	Apps	Goals	Apps	Goals	Apps	Goals	Apps	Goals
Pomorie	2005–06	14	0	1	0	–	–	15	0
Naftex Burgas	2006–07	15	0	0	0	–	–	15	0
Naftex Burgas	2007–08	17	1	2	0	–	–	19	1
Naftex Burgas	2008–09	10	0	1	0	–	–	11	0
Chernomorets Pomorie	2009–10	23	10	6	1	–	–	29	11
Chernomorets Pomorie	2010–11	14	2	3	0	–	–	17	2
Beroe Stara Zagora	2010–11	6	0	0	0	0	0	6	0
Kaliakra Kavarna	2011–12	22	1	4	1	–	–	26	2
Edirnespor	2012–13	10	7	?	?	–	–	10	7
Wisła Puławy	2013–14	15	0	0	0	–	–	15	0
Wisła Puławy	2014–15	26	1	1	0	–	–	27	1
Weston-super-Mare	2015–16	8	1	0	0	–	–	8	1
Neftochimic	2015–16	12	2	0	0	–	–	12	2
Levski Karlovo	2016–17	3	0	0	0	–	–	3	0
Neftochimic	2017–18	27	4	0	0	–	–	27	4
Neftochimic	2018–19	33	15	0	0	–	–	33	15
Neftochimic	2019–20	0	0	0	0	–	–	0	0
Career totals		255	44	18	2	0	0	273	46
