= Lyubomir Todorov =

Bulgarian footballer

Personal information
- Full name: Lyubomir Georgiev Todorov
- Date of birth: 4 October 1988 (age 38)
- Place of birth: Trastenik, Bulgaria
- Height: 1.84 m (6 ft 0 in)
- Position: Forward

Youth career
- Sokol Trastenik
- Levski 2007
- Spartak Pleven

Senior career*
Years	Team	Apps	(Gls)
2006–2008	Spartak Pleven	37	(8)
2009–2010	Lokomotiv Mezdra	25	(3)
2010–2012	Minyor Pernik	11	(0)
2012–2015	Spartak Pleven	66	(42)
2016	Sevlievo		
2016	Spartak Pleven	1	(0)
2017–2018	Levski 2007		
2018–2021	Spartak Pleven		
- * Club domestic league appearances and goals as of 30 August 2016

Lyubomir Georgiev Todorov (Bulgarian: Любомир Тодоров; born 4 October 1988) is a Bulgarian footballer who plays as a forward.

== Career ==
In July 2018, Todorov returned to Spartak Pleven.
