= Kostadin Slaev =

Bulgarian footballer

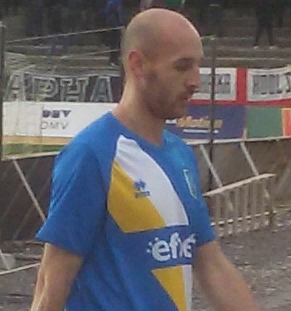

Personal information
- Full name: Kostadin Georgievich Slaev
- Date of birth: 2 October 1989 (age 37)
- Place of birth: Plovdiv, Bulgaria
- Height: 1.84 m (6 ft 1/2 in)
- Position: Left back

Team information
- Current team: Bansko
- Number: 3

Youth career
- 2003–2010: Spartak Plovdiv

Senior career*
Years	Team	Apps	(Gls)
2010–2016	Bansko	123	(5)
2016–2018	Vereya	47	(0)
2018	CSKA 1948	16	(0)
2019–	Bansko	126	(8)
- * Club domestic league appearances and goals as of 18:17, 24 September 2024 (UTC)

Kostadin Georgievich Slaev (Bulgarian: Костадин Георгиевич Слаев; born 2 October 1989) is a Bulgarian footballer who plays as a left back for Bansko.

== Career ==
=== Vereya ===
After six seasons in B Group with Bansko Slaev moved to the newly promoted to First League team Vereya. He made his debut for the team on 30 July 2016 in a match against Dunav Ruse.

=== CSKA 1948 ===
On 14 June 2018, Slaev signed with the newly promoted to Second League CSKA 1948.

== Career statistics ==
=== Club ===
As of 11 May 2017

Club performance			League		Cup		Continental		Other		Total	
Club	League	Season	Apps	Goals	Apps	Goals	Apps	Goals	Apps	Goals	Apps	Goals
Bulgaria			League		Bulgarian Cup		Europe		Other (Note: Includes Bulgarian Supercup matches.)		Total	
Bansko	B Group	2010–11	4	0	0	0	—		—		4	0
Bansko	B Group	2011–12	22	0	0	0	—		—		2	0
Bansko	B Group	2012–13	24	2	2	0	—		—		26	2
Bansko	B Group	2013–14	21	0	1	0	—		—		22	0
Bansko	B Group	2014–15	27	2	2	0	—		—		29	2
Bansko	B Group	2015–16	25	1	2	0	—		—		27	1
Bansko	Total		123	5	7	0	0	0	0	0	130	5
Vereya Stara Zagora	Parva Liga	2016–17	25	0	1	0	—		—		26	0
Vereya Stara Zagora	Total		25	0	1	0	0	0	0	0	26	0
Career statistics			148	5	8	0	0	0	0	0	156	5
