= Nikolay Dimitrov (footballer, born 1990) =

Bulgarian footballer

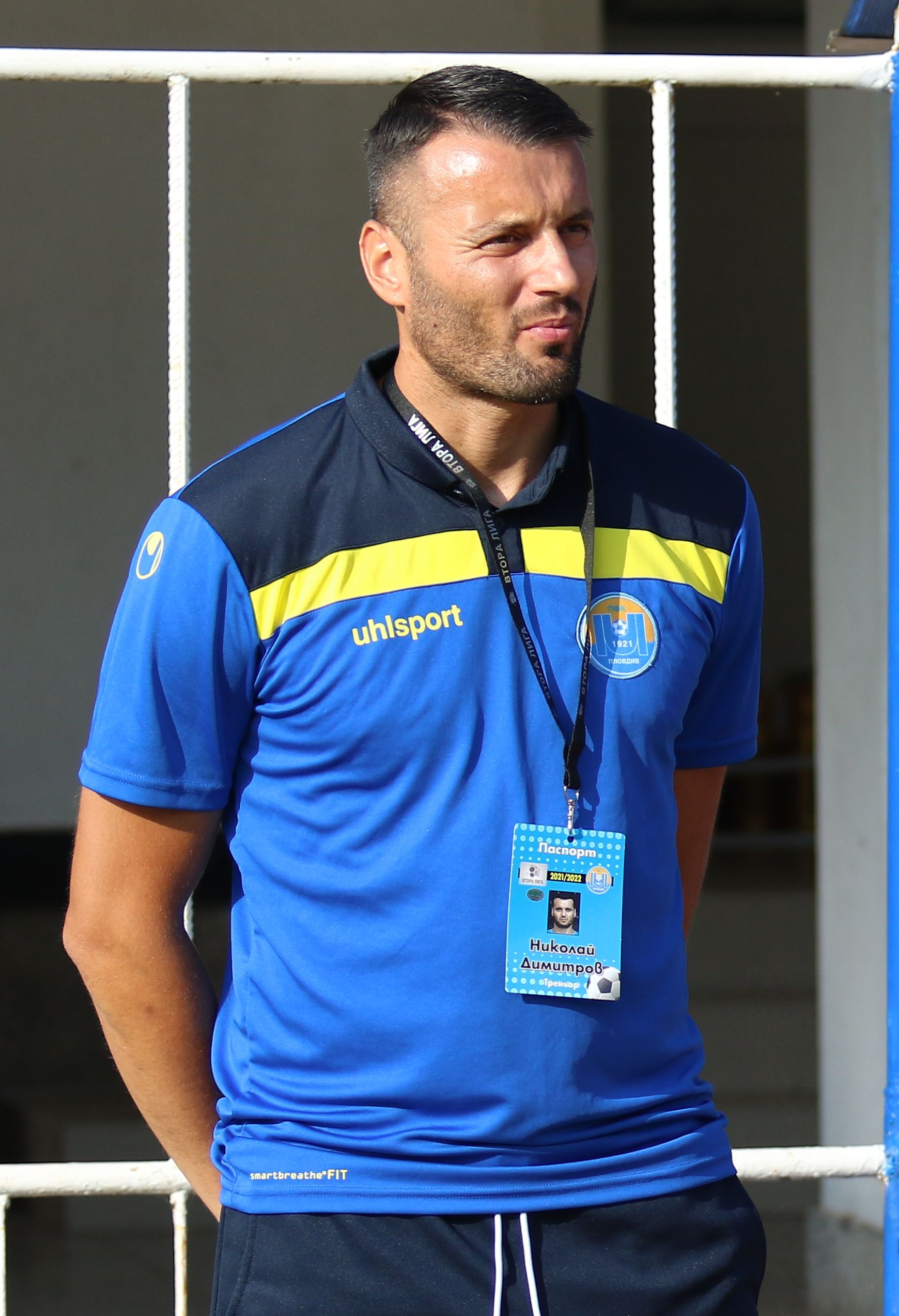

Personal information
- Full name: Nikolay Dimitrov Dimitrov
- Date of birth: 15 June 1990 (age 36)
- Place of birth: Plovdiv, Bulgaria
- Height: 1.86 m (6 ft 1 in)
- Position: Centre back

Team information
- Current team: Maritsa Plovdiv (manager)

Senior career*
Years	Team	Apps	(Gls)
2006–2008	Botev Plovdiv	6	(0)
2008–2010	Sliven 2000	19	(0)
2011–2012	Botev Plovdiv	20	(0)
2012–2014	Haskovo	46	(1)
2015	Chernomorets Burgas	4	(0)
2015–2016	Lokomotiv Plovdiv	4	(0)
2016–2017	Oborishte	11	(0)
2017	Arda	?	(?)
2018	Borislav	?	(?)
2018–2019	Maritsa Plovdiv	?	(?)

Managerial career
- 2020–: Maritsa Plovdiv
- * Club domestic league appearances and goals

Nikolay Dimitrov (Bulgarian: Николай Димитров; born on 15 June 1990) is a Bulgarian former professional footballer and a football manager who currently manages Maritsa Plovdiv.

== Career ==
On 21 June 2017 he joined Third League club Arda Kardzhali but was released in February 2018. A few days later, he joined Borislav Parvomay.

On 10 June 2018, Dimitrov signed with Maritsa Plovdiv.
