= Ivo Malinov =

Bulgarian footballer

Personal information
- Full name: Ivo Ivaylov Malinov
- Date of birth: 29 January 1993 (age 33)
- Place of birth: Bulgaria
- Position: Left back

Senior career*
| Years | Team | Apps | (Gls) |
| 2013–2014 | Dijon II | 2 | (0) |
| 2015 | Botev Vratsa | 6 | (0) |
| 2016 | Sofia 2010 | 14 | (1) |
| 2016 | Neftochimic Burgas | 7 | (0) |
- * Club domestic league appearances and goals as of 13 February 2017

Ivo Malinov (Bulgarian: Иво Малинов; born 29 January 1993) is a Bulgarian footballer, who plays as a defender.
