= Simeon Minchev =

Bulgarian footballer

Personal information
- Full name: Simeon Tenyov Minchev
- Date of birth: 28 June 1982 (age 44)
- Place of birth: Stara Zagora, Bulgaria
- Height: 1.84 m (6 ft 0 in)
- Position: Midfielder

Senior career*
Years	Team	Apps	(Gls)
2001–2007	Beroe	84	(3)
2007–2008	Panegialios	?	(?)
2008–2009	Loko Stara Zagora	27	(2)
2009	Volov Shumen	9	(0)
2010	Beroe	2	(0)
- * Club domestic league appearances and goals as of 1 January 2011

Simeon Minchev (born 28 June 1982) is a Bulgarian footballer who plays as a midfielder.

Minchev last played for Panegialios F.C. in Greece before return to play in Stara Zagora.

- Height - 1.84 m.
- Weight - 73 kg.

== Honours ==
=== Club ===
- Beroe
  - Bulgarian Cup:
    - Winner: 2009-10
