= Darko Stojanov =

Macedonian footballer

Personal information
- Date of birth: 11 February 1990 (age 36)
- Place of birth: Štip, SFR Yugoslavia
- Height: 1.91 m (6 ft 3 in)
- Position: Centre back

Senior career*
Years	Team	Apps	(Gls)
2008–2009	Vardar		
2008	→ Madžari (loan)		
2009–2011	Belasica		
2011–2013	Bregalnica	44	(4)
2013	Horizont Turnovo	11	(1)
2013–2016	Bregalnica	71	(7)
2016	Dunav Ruse	1	(0)
2017	Bregalnica	16	(1)
2017	Borec		
2018	Renova	12	(0)
2019–2020	Bregalnica		
2021–2022	Vardar	19	(0)

International career
2012	Macedonia U-21	1	(0)
- * Club domestic league appearances and goals as of 9 April 2022

Darko Stojanov (Macedonian: Дарко Стојанов; born 11 February 1990) is a Macedonian footballer who plays as a defender.

== Club career ==
In June 2016, Stojanov signed a contract with Bulgarian side Dunav Ruse, after a successful trial period with the club. He was released in October.
