= Yanko Valkanov =

Bulgarian footballer

Personal information
- Full name: Yanko Hristov Valkanov
- Date of birth: 25 July 1982 (age 44)
- Place of birth: Stara Zagora, Bulgaria
- Height: 1.86 m (6 ft 1 in)
- Position: Centre back

Team information
- Current team: WFC Lokomotiv Stara Zagora (manager)

Senior career*
Years	Team	Apps	(Gls)
1999–2002	CSKA Sofia	19	(1)
1999–2000	→ Beroe (loan)	20	(1)
2000	→ Naftex Burgas (loan)	1	(0)
2002–2003	Marek Dupnitsa	16	(0)
2003–2006	Slavia Sofia	64	(11)
2006–2007	MTZ-RIPO Minsk	25	(4)
2007–2008	Kaunas	13	(0)
2008	MTZ-RIPO Minsk	15	(0)
2009	Shanghai Shenhua	27	(5)
2010	Shenzhen Ruby	14	(0)
2010	Dinamo Minsk	11	(0)
2011	Beroe Stara Zagora	7	(1)
2012	Akzhayik	11	(2)
2013	Belshina Bobruisk	8	(0)
2013–2015	Botev Galabovo	47	(1)
2015	Akzhayik	11	(2)
2016	Botev Galabovo	11	(0)
2016–2017	Levski Karlovo	24	(2)
2017–2018	Tundzha Yagoda		
2018–2019	Svilengrad		
2019–2021	Levski Karlovo	0	(0)

International career
2005	Bulgaria	2	(1)

Managerial career
- 2022–: Lokomotiv Stara Zagora (women)
- * Club domestic league appearances and goals as of 31 May 2019

Yanko Hristov Valkanov (Bulgarian: Янко Христов Вълканов; born 25 July 1982) is a Bulgarian football coach and former player who played as a defender. His preferred position on the pitch is right-back, but he can play as a central defender as well.

== Career ==
=== Club ===
==== Early career in Bulgaria ====
He started his professional football career with CSKA Sofia in the 1999/2000 league season and was quickly loaned out to Beroe Stara Zagora to gain more playing time. The following season he was loaned out once more to Naftex Burgas, however he was unable to establish himself and returned to CSKA Sofia during the league season. At the beginning of the 2002/2003 league season he would transfer to Marek Dupnitsa and during his time with them he would attract the interests of Slavia Sofia and would join them before the start of the 2003/2004 where after several seasons he would establish himself as an integral member of their team.

==== Belarus and Lithuania ====
Yanko Valkanov joined reigning Belarusian Cup winners MTZ-RIPO Minsk during the 2006 league season and while he was a squad regular he could not establish himself as a first team regular. By the following season he would move to Lithuanian football club FBK Kaunas during the 2007 league season, however his time with them was not the most productive and halfway through the 2008 league season in July he would return to MTZ-RIPO Minsk.

==== Move to China ====
At the beginning of the 2009 China Super League season he transferred to Shanghai Shenhua. At first he was criticized for poor performances by both fans and the media, but he began to gain popularity on the other end of the pitch; he has so far scored 5 goals (3 in Chinese Super League, 2 in AFC Champions League), becoming the top scorer of his team. On 17 April, he scored two goals using his right shoulder in a Chinese Super League match against Shenzhen. At the end of 2009 season, his position was transformed to striker by Jia Xiuquan. But he played unbelievable jobs that he had made two assists to Aleksander Rodić at critical moment.

Valkanov transferred to Shenzhen Ruby on 28 February 2010. He was released by Shenzhen in July 2010 after New Zealand defender Ivan Vicelich joined the club.

==== Return to Belarus ====
On 8 September 2010, Valkanov signed with FC Dinamo Minsk until the end of the 2010 Belarusian Premier League season. He made his debut four days later in the 4:0 home win against FC Belshina Bobruisk, playing the full 90 minutes.

==== Later career ====
In 2011 Valkanov had a short spell with A PFG club Beroe. He signed with Kazakhstani club Akzhayik in February 2012. On 14 July 2015, Valkanov returned to FC Akzhayik, helping them win the Kazakhstan First Division and gain promotion to the Kazakhstan Premier League.

In August 2017, Valkanov joined Tundzha Yagoda.

=== International career ===
He earned his first call-up to the national side for the friendly match against Azerbaijan, which was held on 17 November 2004.

== Career statistics ==
=== International ===
Bulgaria
Year	Apps	Goals
2005	2	1
Total	2	1

Statistics accurate as of 11 November 2015

=== International goal ===
#	Date	Venue	Opponent	Score	Result	Competition
1	16 November 2005	Reliant Stadium, Houston, USA	Mexico	1–0	3–0	Friendly match
