= Ivelin Iliev =

Bulgarian footballer

Personal information
- Full name: Ivelin Iliev Iliev
- Date of birth: 8 August 1997 (age 29)
- Place of birth: Kazanlak, Bulgaria
- Height: 1.73 m (5 ft 8 in)
- Position: Winger

Team information
- Current team: Rozova Dolina
- Number: 7

Youth career
- Rozova Dolina
- Beroe

Senior career*
Years	Team	Apps	(Gls)
2014–2015	Vereya	14	(0)
2015–2017	Beroe	2	(0)
2016–2017	→ Botev Galabovo (loan)	24	(1)
2017–2018	Rozova Dolina	29	(9)
2018–2020	Kariana	44	(7)
2020–2021	Montana	5	(0)
2021–2022	Strumska Slava	13	(2)
2022–	Rozova Dolina		
- * Club domestic league appearances and goals as of 1 January 2022

Ivelin Iliev (Bulgarian: Ивелин Илиев; born 8 August 1997) is a Bulgarian footballer who currently plays as a winger for Bulgarian Third League club Rozova Dolina.

== Career ==
Iliev started his youth career at the local club Rozova Dolina. Later he moved to Beroe Stara Zagora's academy. In 2014, he moved to Vereya, playing with the team in the B Group. In the beginning of 2016 he returned to Beroe, making his debut in the A Group on 30 April 2016 in a match against Slavia Sofia.

In July 2017, Iliev signed with Botev Vratsa but was released a few weeks later and subsequently joined his hometown club Rozova Dolina.

On 1 July 2018, Iliev joined Kariana.

== Career statistics ==
=== Club ===
As of 10 March 2016

Club performance			League		Cup		Continental		Other		Total	
Club	League	Season	Apps	Goals	Apps	Goals	Apps	Goals	Apps	Goals	Apps	Goals
Bulgaria			League		Bulgarian Cup		Europe		Other (Note: Includes Bulgarian Supercup matches.)		Total	
Vereya Stara Zagora	B Group	2014–15	12	0	0	0	–		–		12	0
Vereya Stara Zagora	B Group	2015–16	2	0	0	0	–		–		2	0
Vereya Stara Zagora	Total		14	0	0	0	0	0	0	0	14	0
Beroe Stara Zagora	A Group	2015–16	1	0	0	0	0 (Note: UEFA Europa League matches.)	0	–		1	0
Beroe Stara Zagora	Total		1	0	0	0	0	0	0	0	1	0
Career statistics			15	0	0	0	0	0	0	0	15	0
