= Miroslav Koev =

Bulgarian footballer

Personal information
- Full name: Miroslav Kalchev Koev
- Date of birth: 22 April 1990 (age 36)
- Place of birth: Burgas, Bulgaria
- Height: 1.77 m (5 ft 10 in)
- Position: Defender

Youth career
- Chernomorets Burgas

Senior career*
Years	Team	Apps	(Gls)
2009–2011	Chernomorets Pomorie	48	(0)
2012	Lokomotiv Sofia	2	(0)
2013	Kaliakra Kavarna	4	(0)
2014–2015	Sozopol	47	(3)
2016	Neftochimic Burgas	4	(0)
2016–2019	Pomorie	60	(0)
2020	Chernomorets Burgas	0	(0)
2020–2021	Yambol 1915		
2021–202?	Chernomorets Burgas		
- * Club domestic league appearances and goals as of 1 February 2020

Miroslav Koev (Bulgarian: Мирослав Коев; born 22 April 1990) is a Bulgarian footballer who plays as a defender.
