= Anton Slavchev =

Bulgarian footballer

Personal information
- Full name: Anton Ivov Slavchev
- Date of birth: 21 June 1995 (age 31)
- Place of birth: Sofia, Bulgaria
- Height: 1.76 m (5 ft 9 in)
- Position: Defender

Team information
- Current team: Minyor Pernik
- Number: 3

Youth career
- Lokomotiv Sofia

Senior career*
Years	Team	Apps	(Gls)
2013–2016	Lokomotiv Sofia	24	(5)
2016	Spartak Pleven	7	(0)
2017–2018	Germanea	–	(–)
2019–	Minyor Pernik	115	(10)
- * Club domestic league appearances and goals as of 5 June 2023

Anton Slavchev (Bulgarian: Антон Славчев; born 21 June 1995) is a Bulgarian footballer who plays as a defender for Minyor Pernik.
