= FC Botev Ihtiman =

Bulgarian football club

Botev Ihtiman
- Full name: Football Club Botev Ihtiman
- Founded: 1921
- Ground: Hristo Botev Stadium
- Capacity: 5,000
- Head coach: Valeri Svilenov
- League: South-West Third League
- 2025–26: South-West Third League, 4th
- Website: fcbotevihtiman.com
Home colours	Away colours

FC Botev Ihtiman (Bulgarian: ФК Ботев Ихтиман) is a Bulgarian association football club based in Ihtiman, which competes in the South-West Third League, the third tier of Bulgarian football league system.

== Players ==
=== Current squad ===
As of 1 November 2026 Note: Flags indicate national team as defined under FIFA eligibility rules; some limited exceptions apply. Players may hold more than one non-FIFA nationality.

No.	Pos.	Nation	Player
1	GK	BUL	Ivan Dermendzhiev
3	DF	BUL	Martin Kostadinov
4	DF	BUL	Tuna Andreev
5	DF	BUL	Stivan Manolov
6	MF	BUL	Krasimir Panchev
7	MF	BUL	Bozhidar Uzunov
8	MF	BUL	Bogomil Hristov
10	MF	BUL	Kristian Andonov
11	MF	BUL	Dimitar Pantaleev
12	FW	BUL	Borislav Baldzhiyski
13	DF	BUL	Svetoslav Slavov

No.	Pos.	Nation	Player
14	FW	BUL	Martin Fotirov
15	DF	BUL	Denis Zashev
16	MF	BUL	Yuliyan Tashev
17	DF	BUL	Emil Angelov
18	DF	BUL	Emil Trendafilov
20	DF	BUL	Ivan Dishkov
22	MF	BUL	Veselin Vasev
23	DF	BUL	Martin Minchev
24	GK	BUL	Valentin Spasov
77	MF	BUL	Stefan Velev
