= FC Pirin Razlog =

Bulgarian football club

Pirin
- Full name: Football Club Pirin Razlog
- Founded: 2002; 24 years ago
- Ground: Gradski Stadium, Razlog
- Capacity: 50,000
- Head coach: Dimitur Padareev
- League: South-West Third League
- 2024–25: South-West Third League, 7th
Home colours	Away colours

Football Club Pirin Razlog (Bulgarian: Пирин Разлог) is a Bulgarian football club based in Razlog, that competes in the South-West Third League.

== History ==
The club was founded as Pirin in 2002. In their second season, they were promoted to South-Western V Group (third tier) as champions of the Regional Group - Blagoevgrad.

In 2010, Ivan Stoychev had been appointed as a manager of Pirin 2002. In 2011–12 season, the club won promotion for the B Group for first time in the club's history.

On 24 June 2016 Pirin merged into PFC Septemvri Sofia. In August 2016 the restored club merged with Malesh Mikrevo and from the new season 2016/17 Pirin will compete in the new Third Southwestern League, the third division of Bulgarian football.

== Honours ==
- Nineteenth place in the "B" group: 1990/91 (as Pirin).
- Twice the 1/32 finals of the tournament for the National Cup: this time its official name is the Cup of Bulgaria - 1990/91 (as Pirin) and 2010/11

== Current squad ==
As of 1 February 2020

Note: Flags indicate national team as defined under FIFA eligibility rules; some limited exceptions apply. Players may hold more than one non-FIFA nationality.

No.	Pos.	Nation	Player
1	GK	BUL	Blagoy Stoyanov
3	DF	BUL	Ivan Arsov
4	DF	BUL	Zhivko Grozdanov
5	DF	BUL	Dimitar Mavrodiev
6	MF	BUL	Radoslav Lefterov
7	DF	BUL	Georgi Fikiyn
8	MF	BUL	Petar Lazarov
9	FW	BUL	Krasimir Shapkarov
10	MF	BUL	Nikolay Pokezhanov (captain)
11	MF	BUL	Ibrahim Alim

No.	Pos.	Nation	Player
12	GK	BUL	Ivan Dimitrov
14	FW	SRB	Miloš Stojanov
15	MF	BUL	Nikolay Dimirov
17	MF	BRA	Matheus
18	FW	BUL	Milen Lefterov
19	MF	BUL	Martin Tatarov
20	MF	BUL	Anton Kostadinov
21	MF	BUL	Mario Dimitrov
22	DF	BUL	Krastyo Pishev
25	MF	COL	Juan Toro
