= FC Levski Karlovo =

Bulgarian football club

- Full name: Football Club Levski Karlovo
- Founded: 1923; 103 years ago
- Ground: Krepost Stadium, Hisarya
- Capacity: 3,000
- Chairman: Emil Kabaivanov
- Manager: Danail Bachkov
- League: South-East Third League
- 2020–21: South-East Third League, 8th
Home colours	Away colours

Levski Karlovo (Bulgarian: Левски Карлово) is a Bulgarian football club based in Karlovo, Plovdiv Province. Founded in 1923, it currently competes in the South-East Third League. The club's colors are blue and white. Levski Karlovo is where Bulgarian international Petar Aleksandrov began his career.

== History ==
=== 1923–2004 ===
Since its founding in 1923, Levski has had 10 seasons in second division, finishing third in 1975, with the last one being in 1981/82, when they finished 17th. Petar Aleksandrov made his debut during that season, scoring 10 goals in 22 matches, before joining Slavia Sofia.

=== 2004–2016: Re-founding ===
The club was dissolved in 2004 only to be re-established later that year. It remained in third division until 2016, when it was promoted.

=== 2016–present: Return to Professional Football ===
On 27 July 2016, Levski was promoted to the newly formed Bulgarian Second League. On 8 August 2016, after 34 years in the amateur leagues, the club returned to professional football in a match against Lokomotiv Sofia on 8 August 2016, which they lost 2:3. On 20 September 2016, Vereya beat Levski with 2:0 in the First round of Bulgarian Cup. After 9 defeats in their first 9 matches for the season, Levski finally notched a 2:0 win over PFC Bansko on 22 September 2016. On 10 December 2016, they defeated group leader Etar Veliko Tarnovo 2:0. After finishing 16th in the table, the club was relegated back to third division for the 2017/18 season.

== Honours ==
- B Group (now Second League):
  - Third-place (1): 1974–75
- Bulgarian Cup:
  - Second Round (1): 1993–94

== Players ==
=== Current squad ===
As of 1 August 2020

Note: Flags indicate national team as defined under FIFA eligibility rules; some limited exceptions apply. Players may hold more than one non-FIFA nationality.

No.	Pos.	Nation	Player
1	GK	BUL	Tsvetan Todorov (captain)
3	DF	BUL	Martin Simeonov
5	DF	BUL	Kostadin Gadzhalov
6	MF	BUL	Ivaylo Marinov
7	FW	BUL	Georgi Andonov
8	MF	BUL	Ivan Toshev
9	FW	BUL	Petar Glavchev
10	MF	BUL	Valentin Slivov
11	MF	BUL	Georgi Georgiev
12	GK	BUL	Vladimir Kostov

No.	Pos.	Nation	Player
14	DF	BUL	Ivan Dikliev
15	DF	BUL	Nadim Angelov
17	DF	BUL	Radoslav Dimitrov
18	DF	BUL	Yanko Valkanov
19	MF	BUL	Petar Petrov
20	MF	BUL	Todor Sultanov
22	MF	BUL	Nikola Popov
30	DF	BUL	Emil Ivanov
79	FW	BUL	Borislav Hadzhiev

== Past seasons ==
Season	League	Place	W	D	L	GF	GA	Pts	Bulgarian Cup
2009–10	V AFG (III)	5	18	8	10	54	28	62	not qualified
2010–11	V AFG	16	12	7	19	39	71	43	not qualified
2011–12	V AFG	14	9	7	18	32	64	34	not qualified
2012–13	V AFG	11	14	8	12	52	53	50	not qualified
2013–14	V AFG	14	7	4	21	35	85	25	not qualified
2014–15	V AFG	14	7	7	16	23	48	28	not qualified
2015–16	V AFG	13	11	2	21	43	75	35	not qualified
2016–17	Second League (II)	16	5	1	24	24	71	16	First round
Green marks a season followed by promotion, red a season followed by relegation.
