= FC Bansko Team =

Bulgarian football club

Bansko Team
- Full name: Association Football Club Bansko Team
- Nickname: The Chamois
- Founded: 1951; 75 years ago
- Ground: St Petar Stadium, Bansko
- Capacity: 200
- Chairman: Georgi Kotsev
- Head coach: Boris Galchev
- League: South-West Third League
- 2025–26: Third League, 13th of 18
- Website: fcbansko.com
Home colours	Away colours

Bansko Team (Bulgarian: Банско Тийм) is a Bulgarian professional association football club from the town of Bansko, currently playing in the South-West Third League, the third division of Bulgarian football. Its home matches take place at the Saint Petar Stadium.

The club was founded in 1951. Until the 2008–09 season, the team participated in either the amateurs Bulgarian divisions. After the union by the two clubs from Blagoevgrad – "Pirin" and "Pirin 1931", FC Bansko took licence of Pirin for participation in the West B Group.

== History ==
Bansko was founded in 1951. The team has largely played in regional leagues throughout its history. The team enjoyed more success in the 21st century. Bansko was promoted to the B PFG for the first time in 2009. A strong selection of players led to success in the second tier of Bulgarian football. In their debut season, Bansko finished third, very close to securing promotion to the top tier. During this season, 2009-10 season, Bansko managed to finish in third place, with 59 points, equal with Akademik Sofia on points. However, Akademik had a better goal difference and was placed second, thus being promoted to the first tier at the expense of Bansko.

On 15 June 2020 the team was transferred under a new operative company and at the start of season 2021–22 the team name was changed to FC Bansko Team.

== Honours ==
B Group:

- 3rd place (1): 2009–10

Bulgarian Cup:

- Third Round (2): 2007–08, 2012–13

== Current squad ==
As of 30 March 2026

Note: Flags indicate national team as defined under FIFA eligibility rules; some limited exceptions apply. Players may hold more than one non-FIFA nationality.

No.	Pos.	Nation	Player
1	GK	BUL	Daniel Grachki
2	DF	BUL	Yordan Lechov
3	DF	BUL	Kostadin Slaev (captain)
5	DF	BUL	Iliya Munin
6	MF	BUL	Radoslav Rashev
7	DF	BUL	Georgi Fikiyn
8	MF	BUL	Lyubomir Hristov
9	FW	BUL	Vladislav Zlatinov
10	MF	BUL	Zhoro Roshkov
11	MF	BUL	Pavel Golovodov
14	FW	BUL	Ibrahim Sherif
15	DF	BUL	Todor Paskov

No.	Pos.	Nation	Player
16	MF	BUL	Aleks Vitanov
17	DF	BUL	Ivan Andonov
18	FW	BUL	Teodor Cholev
19	MF	BUL	Leonardo Manduhov
20	DF	BUL	Mario Dimitrov
21	MF	BUL	Shefket Sariev
22	FW	BUL	Asen Libyahovski
23	MF	BUL	Nedzhmi Vranchev
24	MF	BUL	Georgi Proev
28	MF	BUL	Viktor Ergin
33	GK	BUL	Atanas Tapigyozov

== Managers ==
Dates	Name
2008–2009	(Bulgaria) Boris Nikolov
2009–2010	(Bulgaria) Krasimir Manolov
2010–2013	(Bulgaria) Voyn Voynov
2013–2015	(Bulgaria) Aleksandar Tomash
2016	(Bulgaria) Ivan Atanasov
2016–2017	(Bulgaria) Petko Medvedski
2017–2019	(Bulgaria) Dimitar Krushovski
2021–2024	(Bulgaria) Boris Galchev
2024–	(Bulgaria) Borislav Hazurov

== Past seasons ==
Season	League	Place	W	D	L	GF	GA	Pts	Bulgarian Cup
2009–10	B PFG (II)	3	17	8	5	50	22	59	First round
2010–11	B PFG	4	14	6	10	42	35	48	Second round
2011–12	B PFG	4	10	10	7	36	24	40	Second round
2012–13	B PFG	5	13	7	6	48	26	46	Third round
2013–14	B PFG	5	13	3	10	40	24	42	First round
2014–15	B PFG	4	14	11	5	38	18	53	Second round
2015–16	B PFG	9	11	6	13	42	38	39	Second round
2016–17	Second League (II)	15	6	7	17	26	55	25	First Round
Green marks a season followed by promotion, red a season followed by relegation.
