= FC Oborishte Panagyurishte =

Bulgarian football club

Oborishte Panagyurishte
- Full name: Футболен клуб „Оборище“ Панагюрище; Oborishte Panagyurishte Football Club
- Nickname: Voivodi (Voivodes)
- Founded: 1925; 101 years ago
- Ground: Orcho Voivoda Stadium, Panagyurishte
- Capacity: 3,000
- Chairman: Iliya Anchev
- Head Coach: Hristo Koilov
- League: South-West Third League
- 2025–26: South-West Third League, 7th
Home colours	Away colours

Oborishte (Bulgarian: Оборище) is a Bulgarian association football club based in the town of Panagyurishte, Pazardzhik Province, currently playing in the Third League, the third level of Bulgarian football.

== History ==
Oborishte was founded in 1925 as Aprilski yunak. In 2015, the club secured promotion to the B Group for the first time in the club's history.

== Honours ==
- Second League:
  - 10th: 2015–16
- South-Western Third League:
  - Champions (1): 2014–15
  - Runners up (1): 2018–19

== Current squad ==
As of 1 November 2026

Note: Flags indicate national team as defined under FIFA eligibility rules; some limited exceptions apply. Players may hold more than one non-FIFA nationality.

No.	Pos.	Nation	Player
1	GK	BUL	Michael Matev
2	DF	BUL	Anton Slavchev
3	DF	BUL	Stenislav Georgiev
5	DF	BUL	Martin Sandov
6	MF	BUL	Martin Valchinov
7	MF	BUL	Vladislav Ivanov
9	MF	BUL	Slavi Zarkov
10	MF	BUL	Bozhidar Hristov
11	FW	BUL	Grigor Dolapchiev
12	GK	BUL	Aleksey Andreev
14	MF	BUL	Stefan Stefanov

No.	Pos.	Nation	Player
15	DF	BUL	Aleks Ivanov
16	DF	BUL	Georgi Kremenliev
17	DF	BUL	Vladimir Siromahov
19	FW	BUL	Aleksandar Krastanov
22	MF	BUL	Kristian Belmustakov
24	FW	BUL	Martin Stoilov
27	FW	BUL	Andrey Dudolenski
78	MF	BUL	Aleksandar Bonev
80	MF	BUL	Mario Danchev
88	MF	BUL	Michael Rangelov

== Notable players ==
Had international caps for their respective countries, held any club record, or had more than 100 league appearances. Players whose name is listed in bold represented their countries.

Bulgaria

- (Bulgaria) **Hristo Ivanov**
- (Bulgaria) **Martin Lukov**
- (Bulgaria) **Daniel Mladenov**
- (Bulgaria) Vasil Tachev

Europe

- (North Macedonia) **Vančo Trajanov**

America

- (Brazil) Eli Marques
