= List of Bulgarian football transfers summer 2013 =

This is a list of Bulgarian football transfers for the 2013 summer transfer window. Only transfers involving a team from the A PFG and B PFG are listed.

The summer transfer window opens on 1 July 2013. The window will be closed at midnight on 31 August 2013. Players without a club may join one at any time, either during or in between transfer windows.

== A PFG ==
=== Beroe ===
In:

No.	Pos.	Nation	Player
4	DF	BUL	Kostadin Stoyanov (from CSKA Sofia)
13	MF	BRA	Evandro Roncatto (from (Cyprus) Anorthosis Famagusta)
22	GK	BUL	Blagoy Makendzhiev (from CSKA Sofia)
70	MF	BUL	Georgi Kostadinov (from Ludogorets Razgrad)

Out:

No.	Pos.	Nation	Player
1	GK	BUL	Teodor Skorchev (released)
8	MF	POR	Alberto Louzeiro (released)
11	MF	BUL	Doncho Atanasov (to Lyubimets 2007)
12	GK	BUL	Kiril Akalski (to Lokomotiv Plovdiv)
25	MF	POR	Paulo Jorge (loan return to (England) Blackburn Rovers)
70	FW	MOZ	Jerry Sitoe (loan return to (Portugal) AD Oeiras)
77	MF	POR	Pedro Eugénio (released)
80	FW	BUL	Emil Angelov (to Haskovo)
—	MF	BUL	Georgi Bozhanov (to Minyor Pernik, previously on loan)

=== Botev Plovdiv ===
In:

No.	Pos.	Nation	Player
3	DF	SLO	Elvedin Džinić (from (Belgium) Charleroi)
4	MF	BUL	Bozhidar Vasev (from Pirin Blagoevgrad)
15	FW	BUL	Valeri Domovchiyski (from (Germany) MSV Duisburg)
17	MF	MAD	Anicet Abel (from CSKA Sofia)
22	FW	NED	Romario Kortzorg (from (Netherlands) Dordrecht)
28	DF	BUL	Filip Filipov (from Slavia Sofia)
88	MF	BUL	Georgi Sarmov (from (Turkey) Kasımpaşa)

Out:

No.	Pos.	Nation	Player
3	DF	BUL	Asen Karaslavov (retired)
4	MF	BUL	Bozhidar Vasev (on loan to Rakovski)
13	MF	BUL	Nikolay Pavlov (on loan to Chernomorets Burgas)
15	DF	NED	Marlon Pereira (to (Netherlands) SC Cambuur)
20	MF	BUL	Serkan Yusein (on loan to Rakovski)
21	GK	BUL	Filip Dimitrov (on loan to Rakovski)
55	DF	BUL	Angel Rahov (on loan to Rakovski)
90	FW	BUL	Petar Atanasov (on loan to Chernomorets Burgas, previously on loan at Rakovski)

=== Cherno More ===
In:

No.	Pos.	Nation	Player
3	MF	BUL	Daniel Georgiev (from Lokomotiv Plovdiv)
4	DF	BUL	Mihail Venkov (from CSKA Sofia)
5	DF	BUL	Stefan Stanchev (from Minyor Pernik)
6	DF	BUL	Kiril Kotev (from Lokomotiv Plovdiv)
9	FW	ESP	Bacari (from (Spain) L'Hospitalet)
10	MF	BUL	Todor Palankov (from Chernomorets Burgas)
17	FW	BUL	Ivan Kokonov (from Slavia Sofia)
20	MF	NGR	Stanley Okoro (on loan from (Spain) Almería B)
23	MF	BUL	Daniel Mladenov (from Montana)

Out:

No.	Pos.	Nation	Player
4	DF	BUL	Detelin Dimitrov (to Dobrudzha Dobrich)
5	MF	BRA	Samuel Camazzola (released)
9	FW	VEN	Hermes Palomino (to Atlético Venezuela)
10	FW	BUL	Miroslav Manolov (to Litex Lovech)
13	MF	BUL	Todor Kolev (to Lyubimets 2007)
18	DF	SLO	Sebastjan Komel (released)
19	FW	FRA	Bruce Inkango (to (Turkey) Denizlispor)
23	MF	BUL	Simeon Simeonov (to Dobrudzha Dobrich)
26	DF	BUL	Georgi Radev (to Dobrudzha Dobrich)
30	MF	BUL	Ilian Kapitanov (end of contract)
37	GK	BUL	Georgi Stavrev (to Ludogorets Razgrad)
83	MF	ESP	Cristian Hidalgo (to (Israel) Bnei Sakhnin)

=== Chernomorets Burgas ===
In:

No.	Pos.	Nation	Player
3	DF	BUL	Trayan Trayanov (from Neftochimic Burgas)
8	MF	BUL	Milen Gamakov (loan return from Neftochimic Burgas)
10	MF	POR	Marquinho (from (Portugal) Ribeira Brava)
11	FW	SEN	Mouhamed Soly (from (France) Guingamp)
13	MF	ALG	Najib Ammari (from (France) Marseille)
14	MF	FRA	Jérémy Manzorro (from (France) Bourg-Péronnas)
23	DF	POR	Chico (from (Portugal) Portimonense)
24	DF	BUL	Martin Kavdanski (from Lokomotiv Plovdiv)
26	MF	BUL	Nikolay Pavlov (on loan from Botev Plovdiv)
87	MF	POR	Carlos Fonseca (from (Portugal) Feirense)
88	GK	BUL	Svilen Notev (from Master Burgas)
89	DF	BRA	Oliveira (from (Portugal) Feirense)
90	FW	BUL	Petar Atanasov (on loan from Botev Plovdiv)
91	MF	FRA	Oussama Mrabet (from (Tunisia) ES Zarzis)
94	FW	CAF	Josué Balamandji (from (France) Paris FC)

Out:

No.	Pos.	Nation	Player
2	DF	BUL	Trayan Dyankov (to Chernomorets Balchik)
3	DF	BUL	Georgi Terziev (to Ludogorets Razgrad)
5	DF	BUL	Tihomir Trifonov (released)
6	MF	BUL	Todor Palankov (to Cherno More)
7	MF	BUL	Borislav Baldzhiyski (to Slavia Sofia)
11	FW	SEN	Mouhamed Soly (released)
12	GK	BUL	Stoyan Kolev (to CSKA Sofia)
18	MF	COD	Aurélien Ngeyitala (released)
21	DF	BUL	Aleksandar Bashliev (released)
22	MF	BUL	Tsvetomir Tsonkov (to Neftochimic Burgas)
32	MF	BFA	Issouf Ouattara (released)
37	DF	FRA	Jérémy Faug-Porret (to CSKA Sofia)
39	MF	ALG	Yanis Youcef (released)
78	FW	FRA	Loris Arnaud (released)
92	MF	FRA	Gaël N’Lundulu (to Lokomotiv Sofia)

=== CSKA Sofia ===
In:

No.	Pos.	Nation	Player
4	FW	BUL	Rangel Abushev (from Lokomotiv Plovdiv)
5	MF	BUL	Todor Yanchev (from Slavia Sofia)
6	DF	SEN	Jackson Mendy (from (Greece) Levadiakos)
7	FW	MLI	Mamady Sidibé (from (England) Stoke City)
8	MF	BUL	Nikolay Dyulgerov (from Slavia Sofia)
9	FW	MKD	Hristijan Kirovski (from (Greece) Iraklis)
11	MF	SRB	Nemanja Milisavljević (from Ludogorets Razgrad)
14	DF	BUL	Valentin Iliev (from (Ukraine) Volyn Lutsk)
15	MF	ENG	Brian Howard (from (England) Bristol City)
17	MF	BUL	Martin Petrov (Free agent)
20	MF	BEN	Omar Kossoko (from (Switzerland) Servette)
22	DF	BUL	Ivo Raykov (from Pirin Blagoevgrad)
23	MF	BUL	Emil Gargorov (from Ludogorets Razgrad)
37	DF	FRA	Jérémy Faug-Porret (from Chernomorets Burgas)
41	FW	POR	Bruno Moreira (on loan from (Portugal) Nacional da Madeira)
77	MF	BRA	Revson (on loan from (Portugal) Nacional da Madeira)
92	GK	ALG	Raïs M'Bolhi (from (Russia) Krylia Sovetov)
99	GK	BUL	Stoyan Kolev (from Chernomorets Burgas)

Out:

No.	Pos.	Nation	Player
1	GK	BUL	Anatoli Gospodinov (on loan to Vitosha Bistritsa)
4	DF	BUL	Mihail Venkov (to Cherno More)
5	DF	BUL	Kostadin Stoyanov (to Beroe Stara Zagora)
6	DF	BUL	Plamen Krachunov (to Lokomotiv Plovdiv)
7	FW	BUL	Spas Delev (to (Spain) Las Palmas)
8	MF	BRA	Lucas Sasha (to (Israel) Hapoel Tel Aviv)
10	MF	POR	Serginho (to (Ukraine) Metalurh Zaporizhya)
11	DF	BUL	Ivan Bandalovski (to (Belgium) Oud-Heverlee Leuven)
14	FW	TOG	Serge Nyuiadzi (to (Lithuania) Žalgiris Vilnius)
15	FW	BUL	Stanko Yovchev (to Lokomotiv Plovdiv)
16	MF	BUL	Aleksandar Yakimov (to Loko Plovdiv, previously on loan at Botev Vratsa)
17	FW	MAD	Anicet Abel (to Botev Plovdiv)
20	MF	BUL	Bogomil Hristov (to Slavia Sofia)
22	FW	BUL	Martin Kamburov (to Lokomotiv Plovdiv)
23	FW	BRA	Michel Platini (to Ludogorets Razgrad)
55	MF	GRE	Ilias Kyriakidis (to (Greece) AEL)
70	MF	URU	Ignacio Lores Varela (loan return to (Italy) Palermo)
85	GK	BUL	Bozhidar Stoychev (to Lokomotiv Plovdiv)
88	GK	BUL	Blagoy Makendzhiev (to Beroe Stara Zagora)
99	FW	CMR	Njongo Priso (to (Romania) Petrolul Ploiești)

=== Levski Sofia ===
In:

No.	Pos.	Nation	Player
1	GK	CRO	Goran Blažević (from (Croatia) Hajduk Split)
5	DF	ESP	Álex Pérez (on loan from (Spain) Getafe)
7	FW	BUL	Dimitar Makriev (from (Israel) Ashdod)
9	FW	BUL	Tsvetan Genkov (from (Poland) Wisła Kraków)
20	MF	BUL	Miroslav Ivanov (from Ludogorets Razgrad)
26	DF	BUL	Hristo Popadiyn (loan return from (Italy) Chievo)
59	MF	GUI	Larsen Touré (from (France) Brest)
75	MF	MRI	Kévin Bru (from (France) Istres)
—	MF	BRA	Ramon Lopes (from (Ukraine) Volyn Lutsk)

Out:

No.	Pos.	Nation	Player
1	GK	BUL	Ivaylo Vasilev (to Haskovo)
3	DF	FRA	Romain Élie (released)
7	MF	BUL	Milen Vasilev (to Slavia Sofia)
8	MF	SVK	Roman Procházka (on loan to (Slovakia) Spartak Trnava)
9	FW	POR	João Silva (to (Italy) Bari)
10	MF	BUL	Hristo Yovov (retired)
12	FW	NED	Sjoerd Ars (to (Turkey) Karşıyaka, previously on loan at (Turkey) Konyaspor)
16	MF	POR	Cristóvão Ramos (to (Turkey) Konyaspor)
17	FW	BUL	Todor Chavorski (on loan to Dobrudzha, previously on loan at Pirin Razlog)
19	FW	GBS	Basile de Carvalho (to (Belgium) White Star Bruxelles)
29	MF	SLO	Rene Mihelič (loan return to (Portugal) Nacional Madeira)
32	MF	BUL	Radoslav Tsonev (on loan to Botev Vratsa)
—	MF	BRA	Ramon Lopes (to (Ukraine) Volyn Lutsk)

=== Litex Lovech ===
In:

No.	Pos.	Nation	Player
8	MF	BUL	Stanislav Genchev (from Ludogorets Razgrad)
9	FW	COL	Wilmar Jordán Gil (from (South Korea) Seongnam Ilhwa Chunma)
10	MF	GER	Jürgen Gjasula (from (Germany) MSV Duisburg)
11	FW	BUL	Miroslav Manolov (from Cherno More)
12	GK	BUL	Boyan Peykov (from Minyor Pernik)
24	MF	BUL	Petar Zlatinov (from (Azerbaijan) Inter Baku)
33	DF	BIH	Džemal Berberović (from (Germany) MSV Duisburg)

Out:

No.	Pos.	Nation	Player
9	FW	BUL	Ismail Isa (to (Moldova) Sheriff Tiraspol)
10	FW	BRA	Stênio Júnior (on loan to (North Macedonia) Pelister)
15	MF	BUL	Tomi Kostadinov (to (Greece) Chania)
17	MF	BUL	Georgi Milanov (to (Russia) CSKA Moscow)
23	MF	SRB	Nebojša Jelenković (retired)
24	MF	ALB	Edon Hasani (to (Romania) Ceahlăul Piatra Neamț)

=== Lokomotiv Plovdiv ===
In:

No.	Pos.	Nation	Player
1	GK	BUL	Bozhidar Stoychev (from CSKA Sofia)
5	DF	GRE	Konstantinos Kasnaferis (from (Greece) Aris)
6	DF	BUL	Plamen Krachunov (from CSKA Sofia)
7	MF	BUL	Yordan Todorov (from (Greece) Panserraikos)
9	MF	BUL	Dani Kiki (from Lokomotiv Sofia)
11	FW	BUL	Martin Kamburov (from CSKA Sofia)
18	DF	BUL	Asen Georgiev (from Botev Vratsa)
20	MF	TUN	Tijani Belaïd (from (Portugal) Moreirense)
21	FW	BUL	Stanko Yovchev (from CSKA Sofia)
22	MF	FRA	Alassane N'Diaye (from (England) Hastings United)
23	GK	BUL	Kiril Akalski (from Beroe Stara Zagora)
25	DF	BUL	Ruslan Kuang (from Botev Vratsa)
27	MF	BUL	Aleksandar Yakimov (from CSKA Sofia)
28	MF	GRE	Stelios Iliadis (from (Greece) Kerkyra)
33	DF	BUL	Aleksandar Tunchev (from (Poland) Zagłębie Lubin)
50	FW	BRA	Gabriel do Carmo (from (Greece) Asteras Tripolis)
53	MF	BRA	Flávio Paulino (from (Brazil) Paulista)
75	DF	TUN	Aymen Belaïd (from (Tunisia) Étoile du Sahel)
77	FW	BUL	Zdravko Lazarov (from Slavia Sofia)
91	FW	FRA	Chris Gadi (from (France) Marseille)
99	FW	BUL	Andrey Atanasov (from Botev Vratsa)

Out:

No.	Pos.	Nation	Player
1	GK	BUL	Petar Denchev (to Neftochimic Burgas)
4	MF	BUL	Rangel Abushev (to CSKA Sofia)
5	DF	BUL	Pavel Kovachev (released)
6	DF	BUL	Kiril Kotev (to Cherno More)
9	FW	BUL	Vladislav Mirchev (released)
11	MF	BUL	Zapryan Zapryanov (to Rakovski)
15	DF	BUL	Hristo Stamov (on loan to Eurocollege)
16	MF	BUL	Hristo Zlatinski (to Ludogorets Razgrad)
19	MF	BUL	Chetin Sadula (to Vitosha Bistritsa)
23	MF	BUL	Daniel Georgiev (to Cherno More)
24	DF	BUL	Martin Kavdanski (to Chernomorets Burgas)
38	DF	BUL	Atanas Atanasov (released)
40	GK	BUL	Kristiyan Katsarev (to Lokomotiv Sofia)
82	MF	BUL	Yordan Yurukov (to Pirin Razlog)
95	FW	BUL	Serafim Mihaylov (to Pirin Gotse Delchev)

=== Lokomotiv Sofia ===
In:

No.	Pos.	Nation	Player
3	DF	FRA	Luc-Christopher Matutu (from (France) Beauvais Oise)
5	DF	SRB	Marko Ranđelović (from (Kazakhstan) Taraz)
13	MF	ESP	Sota (from (Canada) Thunder Bay Chill)
17	MF	BUL	Todor Hristov (from Marek Dupnitsa)
19	MF	BUL	Dilyan Kolev (from (Montenegro) Čelik Nikšić)
21	MF	BUL	Daniel Gadzhev (Free agent)
22	GK	BUL	Kristiyan Katsarev (from Lokomotiv Plovdiv)
47	DF	MNE	Milan Jovanović (from (Serbia) Red Star Belgrade)
69	DF	FRA	Helton Dos Reis (from (France) Lyon-Duchère)
91	FW	FRA	Cédric Baseya (Free agent)
92	MF	FRA	Gaël N’Lundulu (from Chernomorets Burgas)
94	MF	CHA	Azrack Mahamat (from Etar 1924)

Out:

No.	Pos.	Nation	Player
2	DF	BUL	Kostadin Velkov (to Slavia Sofia)
3	DF	BUL	Ivelin Yanev (to Neftochimic Burgas)
9	FW	BUL	Antonio Pavlov (to Bansko)
10	MF	BUL	Marcho Dafchev (end of contract)
11	DF	BUL	Kristian Dobrev (retired)
13	MF	BRA	Wilker (released)
19	MF	BUL	Svetoslav Petrov (to Lyubimets 2007)
26	DF	BUL	Nikolay Nikolov (to Pirin Gotse Delchev)
69	MF	BUL	Dani Kiki (to Lokomotiv Plovdiv)
88	MF	BUL	Atanas Bornosuzov (end of contract)

=== Ludogorets Razgrad ===
In:

No.	Pos.	Nation	Player
8	MF	POR	Fábio Espinho (from (Portugal) Moreirense)
17	MF	ESP	Dani Abalo (from (Spain) Celta Vigo)
23	MF	BUL	Hristo Zlatinski (from Lokomotiv Plovdiv)
55	DF	BUL	Georgi Terziev (from Chernomorets Burgas)
93	MF	NED	Virgil Misidjan (from (Netherlands) Willem II)
99	FW	BRA	Michel Platini (from CSKA Sofia)

Out:

No.	Pos.	Nation	Player
1	GK	SRB	Uroš Golubović (end of contract)
3	DF	BUL	Teynur Marem (on loan to Haskovo)
6	MF	BUL	Georgi Kostadinov (to Beroe Stara Zagora)
8	MF	BUL	Stanislav Genchev (to Litex Lovech)
15	MF	SRB	Nemanja Milisavljević (to CSKA Sofia)
22	MF	BUL	Miroslav Ivanov (to Levski Sofia)
23	MF	BUL	Emil Gargorov (to CSKA Sofia)
33	DF	SVK	Ľubomír Guldan (to (Poland) Zagłębie Lubin)

=== Lyubimets 2007 ===
In:

No.	Pos.	Nation	Player
1	GK	BUL	Tsvetomir Tsankov (from Neftochimic Burgas)
3	DF	BUL	Tanko Dyakov (from (Kazakhstan) Zhetysu)
4	DF	BUL	Stiliyan Nikolov (from Chavdar Etropole)
5	DF	BUL	Tsvetomir Panov (from Spartak Pleven)
10	MF	BRA	Mauro Alonso (from (Libya) Al-Ittihad Tripoli)
11	MF	BUL	Slavcho Shokolarov (from Montana)
14	MF	BUL	Petar Stoyanov (from (Greece) Olympiacos Volos)
15	MF	BUL	Todor Kolev (from Cherno More)
16	MF	BUL	Valentin Veselinov (from Etar 1924)
17	MF	BUL	Ivan Valchanov (from Chavdar Etropole)
20	MF	BUL	Doncho Atanasov (from Beroe Stara Zagora)
22	DF	GRE	Eleftherios Sakellariou (from (Greece) PAOK)
30	MF	BUL	Orlin Orlinov (Free agent)
—	GK	BUL	Tsvetan Dimitrov (from Neftochimic Burgas)
—	MF	BUL	Vladislav Romanov (from (Poland) Cracovia)
—	MF	BUL	Andon Gushterov (from Septemvri Simitli)
—	MF	BUL	Svetoslav Petrov (from Lokomotiv Sofia)
—	MF	BUL	Ivo Ivanov (from Spartak Pleven)

Out:

No.	Pos.	Nation	Player
3	DF	BUL	Martin Dimov (to Vitosha Bistritsa)
5	DF	BUL	Simeon Ivanov (to Vitosha Bistritsa)
7	MF	BUL	Kiril Zakov (released)
9	FW	BUL	Dimitar Vodenicharov (to (North Macedonia) Pelister)
10	MF	BUL	Georgi Chakarov (released)
15	MF	BUL	Emil Ivanov (released)
16	DF	BUL	Slavi Shopov (to Bansko)
17	MF	BUL	Deyan Lozev (to Haskovo)
20	DF	BUL	Ventsislav Yordanov (released)
22	FW	BUL	Borislav Borisov (released)
30	MF	BUL	Iliyan Trifonov (to OFC Etar)
—	GK	BUL	Tsvetan Dimitrov (released)
—	MF	BUL	Vladislav Romanov (released)
—	MF	BUL	Andon Gushterov (released)
—	MF	BUL	Svetoslav Petrov (released)
—	MF	BUL	Ivo Ivanov (released)

=== Neftochimic Burgas ===
In:

No.	Pos.	Nation	Player
1	GK	BUL	Petar Denchev (from Lokomotiv Plovdiv)
2	MF	FRA	Kevin Coulibaly (Free agent)
3	DF	BUL	Angel Yoshev (from Svetkavitsa)
12	GK	BUL	Plamen Kolev (from Vereya Stara Zagora)
16	DF	BUL	Anton Dimitrov (from Svetkavitsa)
17	MF	BUL	Tsvetan Iliev (from Svetkavitsa)
18	FW	BUL	Deyan Hristov (from Svetkavitsa)
19	DF	BUL	Mihael Orachev (from Chernomorets Burgas)
21	MF	BUL	Kosta Yanev (Free agent)
22	MF	BUL	Tsvetomir Tsonkov (from Chernomorets Burgas)
23	FW	BUL	Gerasim Zakov (from (China) Chengdu Blades)
25	MF	BUL	Nikolay Chipev (from Svetkavitsa)
27	MF	BUL	Georgi Valchev (from Svetkavitsa)
35	DF	BUL	Anton Vergilov (from (Malta) Ħamrun Spartans)
81	DF	BUL	Ivelin Yanev (from Lokomotiv Sofia)
88	MF	BUL	Petar Dimitrov (from Slavia Sofia)
—	GK	BUL	Ivan Georgiev (from Svetkavitsa)
—	DF	BUL	Trayan Trayanov (from Svetkavitsa)

Out:

No.	Pos.	Nation	Player
1	GK	BUL	Tsvetan Dimitrov (to Lyubimets 2007)
5	DF	BUL	Miroslav Enchev (to Botev Galabovo)
6	MF	BUL	Milen Gamakov (loan return to Chernomorets Burgas)
7	MF	BUL	Hyusein Filipov (to Vereya Stara Zagora)
8	MF	BUL	Mihail Georgiev (to Master Burgas)
10	MF	BUL	Stanimir Mitev (to Nesebar)
12	GK	BUL	Tsvetomir Tsankov (to Lyubimets 2007)
22	DF	BUL	Ivan Ivanov (to Botev Lukovit)
23	DF	BUL	Dian Moldovanov (released)
—	GK	BUL	Ivan Georgiev (to Dunav Ruse)
—	DF	BUL	Trayan Trayanov (to Chernomorets Burgas)

=== Pirin Gotse Delchev ===
In:

No.	Pos.	Nation	Player
14	DF	BUL	Murad Ibrahim (from Pirin Blagoevgrad)
16	FW	BUL	Serafim Mihaylov (from Lokomotiv Plovdiv)
18	MF	BUL	Daniel Vasev (from Slavia Sofia)
19	MF	BUL	Martin Gaziev (Free agent)
35	FW	BUL	Kostadin Bashov (from (Cyprus) AEP Paphos)
—	DF	BUL	Nikolay Nikolov (from Lokomotiv Sofia)

Out:

No.	Pos.	Nation	Player
1	GK	BUL	Dimitar Kurshumov (released)
2	DF	BUL	Zefir Katunchev (released)
4	DF	BUL	Atanas Drenovichki (to Slivnishki geroi)
11	MF	BUL	Viktor Shishkov (to (Armenia) Alashkert)
14	MF	BUL	Lyubomir Vitanov (released)
18	MF	BUL	Rumen Lapantov (released)
—	DF	BUL	Nikolay Nikolov (released)

=== Slavia Sofia ===
In:

No.	Pos.	Nation	Player
3	MF	CMR	Albert Baning (from (France) Metz)
4	MF	BUL	Milen Vasilev (from Levski Sofia)
5	DF	BUL	Kostadin Velkov (from Lokomotiv Sofia)
6	MF	BUL	Borislav Baldzhiyski (from Chernomorets Burgas)
7	MF	BUL	Hristo Yanev (from (Greece) Panetolikos)
9	FW	BUL	Atanas Kurdov (Free agent)
21	DF	BUL	Georgi Pashov (loan return from Montana)
23	MF	RUS	Oleg Shalayev (from (Russia) Krylia Sovetov Samara)
26	MF	BUL	Bogomil Hristov (from CSKA Sofia)
75	MF	FRA	Plaisir Bahamboula (from (Finland) MYPA)
77	MF	BUL	Aleksandar Aleksandrov (from Minyor Pernik)
91	MF	BRA	Fernando Silva (from (Brazil) Caldense)
99	FW	BRA	Diego Neves (from (Brazil) Confiança)

Out:

No.	Pos.	Nation	Player
5	MF	BUL	Todor Yanchev (to CSKA Sofia)
6	DF	BUL	Daniel Zlatkov (to (Turkey) Boluspor)
7	MF	JPN	Daisuke Matsui (to (Poland) Lechia Gdańsk)
9	FW	BUL	Todor Kolev (released)
18	DF	BUL	Filip Filipov (to Botev Plovdiv)
19	FW	BUL	Miroslav Antonov (to Montana)
21	DF	BUL	Bogomil Dyakov (to Montana)
23	MF	JPN	Taisuke Akiyoshi (released)
24	MF	BUL	Spas Georgiev (to Dobrudzha Dobrich)
26	MF	BUL	Nikolay Dyulgerov (to CSKA Sofia)
35	MF	POR	Fernando Livramento (to (Portugal) Farense)
71	MF	BUL	Daniel Vasev (to Pirin Gotse Delchev)
77	FW	BUL	Zdravko Lazarov (to Lokomotiv Plovdiv)
88	MF	BUL	Petar Dimitrov (to Neftochimic Burgas)
99	GK	BUL	Ivaylo Ivanov (retired)
—	MF	BUL	Borislav Baldzhiyski (Botev Ihtiman)
—	FW	BUL	Ivan Kokonov (to Cherno More, previously on loan at Botev Vratsa)
—	FW	BRA	Jose Junior (to (Turkey) Adana Demirspor, previously on loan)

== B PFG ==
=== Akademik Svishtov ===
In:

No.	Pos.	Nation	Player
3	DF	BUL	Radoslav Bachev (from Septemvri Simitli)
8	MF	BUL	Antoni Ivanov (on loan from Ludogorets Razgrad)
10	MF	BUL	Evgeni Ignatov (from Chavdar Etropole)
12	GK	BUL	Radoslav Mihailov (on loan from Ludogorets Razgrad)

Out:

No.	Pos.	Nation	Player

=== Bansko ===
In:

No.	Pos.	Nation	Player

Out:

No.	Pos.	Nation	Player
5	DF	BUL	Vangel Stoyanov (released)
15	MF	BUL	Petar Tonchev (released)
16	MF	BUL	Miroslav Nikolov (released)

=== Botev Galabovo ===
In:

No.	Pos.	Nation	Player
1	GK	BUL	Petar Debarliev (Free agent)
3	DF	BUL	Miroslav Enchev (from Neftochimic Burgas)
17	DF	BUL	Daniel Dobrikov (Free agent)
55	MF	BUL	Isus Angelov (from Beroe Stara Zagora)
71	MF	BUL	Milen Tanev (from Beroe Stara Zagora)

Out:

No.	Pos.	Nation	Player

=== Botev Vratsa ===
In:

No.	Pos.	Nation	Player
11	FW	BUL	Georgi Kakalov (Free agent)
12	DF	BUL	Vladimir Bayrev (Free agent)
16	DF	BUL	Kamen Kamenov (Free agent)
17	MF	BUL	Plamen Iliev (on loan from Levski Sofia)
20	MF	BUL	Aleksandar Kirov (Free agent)
21	MF	BUL	Radoslav Tsonev (on loan from Levski Sofia)
22	MF	BUL	Kristiyan Dimitrov (Free agent)
30	FW	BUL	Zhak Koen (Free agent)
33	GK	BUL	Veselin Tsvetkovski (Free agent)

Out:

No.	Pos.	Nation	Player
2	DF	ITA	Alessandro Marchetti (released)
3	DF	BRA	Jairo (released)
5	MF	BRA	Vicente (loan return to (Italy) Padova)
10	FW	BUL	Andrey Atanasov (released)
11	MF	BUL	Aleksandar Yakimov (released)
13	DF	BUL	Nikolay Marinov (released)
15	DF	BUL	Rosen Vankov (released)
16	MF	BUL	Tsvetelin Tonev (loan return to Levski Sofia)
17	MF	BUL	Ivan Kokonov (loan return to Slavia Sofia)
18	MF	BUL	Pavel Petkov (released)
20	MF	BUL	Asen Georgiev (released)
21	GK	BUL	Zdravko Chavdarov (released)
22	DF	BUL	Ruslan Kuang (to Lokomotiv Plovdiv)

=== Dobrudzha ===
In:

No.	Pos.	Nation	Player
1	GK	BUL	Aleksandar Konov (on loan from Litex Lovech)
2	DF	BUL	Georgi Radev (from Cherno More Varna)
4	DF	BUL	Detelin Dimitrov (from Cherno More Varna)
10	FW	BUL	Kristiyan Petkov (on loan from Litex Lovech)
14	MF	BUL	Simeon Simeonov (from Cherno More Varna)
17	FW	BUL	Todor Chavorski (on loan from Levski Sofia)
18	MF	BUL	Kristiyan Malinov (on loan from Litex Lovech)
19	FW	BUL	Ivan Tsachev (from Kaliakra Kavarna)
89	DF	BUL	Kostadin Gadzhalov (Free agent)

Out:

No.	Pos.	Nation	Player
—	DF	BUL	Borislav Iliev (released)
—	DF	BUL	Marian Stanchev (released)
—	MF	BUL	Yordan Apostolov (released)
—	MF	BUL	Preslav Pasev (released)
—	MF	BUL	Mladen Stoev (to Dunav 2010)
—	FW	BUL	Nikolay Valev (released)

=== Dunav 2010 ===
In:

No.	Pos.	Nation	Player
18	MF	BUL	Mladen Stoev (from Dobrudzha)

Out:

No.	Pos.	Nation	Player

=== Haskovo 2009 ===
In:

No.	Pos.	Nation	Player
8	FW	BUL	Emil Angelov (from Beroe Stara Zagora)
15	FW	BUL	Tsvetomir Matev (from Dimitrovgrad)
23	MF	BUL	Vladislav Uzunov (from Kaliakra)

Out:

No.	Pos.	Nation	Player

=== Kaliakra ===
In:

No.	Pos.	Nation	Player
12	MF	BUL	Plamen Kozhuharov (Free agent)

Out:

No.	Pos.	Nation	Player
3	DF	BUL	Marian Ivanov (released)
4	DF	BUL	Miroslav Koev (released)
10	MF	BUL	Ivelin Kostov (released)
15	DF	BUL	Rostislav Yankov (released)
19	FW	BUL	Pavlin Todorov (released)
33	GK	BUL	Hristian Slavov (released)

=== Marek 2010 ===
In:

No.	Pos.	Nation	Player
15	MF	BUL	Petar Tonchev (Free agent)

Out:

No.	Pos.	Nation	Player

=== Montana ===
In:

No.	Pos.	Nation	Player
1	GK	BUL	Hristo Ivanov (Free agent)
2	DF	BUL	Georgi Mechedzhiev (Free agent)
10	FW	BUL	Ventsislav Ivanov (Free agent)
17	MF	BUL	Blagoy Nakov (Free agent)
23	DF	BUL	Bogomil Dyakov (Free agent)
24	DF	BUL	Martin Dechev (Free agent)
26	DF	BUL	Martin Vasilev (Free agent)

Out:

No.	Pos.	Nation	Player
4	DF	NGR	Victor Deniran (released)
12	GK	BUL	Veselin Tsvetkovski (released)
13	DF	BUL	Milen Lahchev (released)
16	MF	BUL	Vladimir Michev (released)
17	DF	BUL	Georgi Pashov (released)
18	MF	BUL	Slavcho Shokolarov (released)
21	MF	ALG	Farès Brahimi (released)
23	MF	BUL	Daniel Mladenov (released)
27	MF	BRA	Thiago Miracema (loan return to (Brazil) Sampaio Corrêa)
32	MF	CGO	Cololo Minou (released)

=== Pirin Razlog ===
In:

No.	Pos.	Nation	Player

Out:

No.	Pos.	Nation	Player
10	FW	BUL	Todor Chavorski (loan return to Levski Sofia)
11	MF	BUL	Vladislav Shumantov (released)
13	MF	BUL	Zlatko Bogoev (released)
15	MF	BUL	Bogdan Stoyanov (released)
21	MF	BUL	Nikolay Hadzhinikolov (released)
28	GK	BUL	Atanas Arshinkov (released)

=== Rakovski 2011 ===
In:

No.	Pos.	Nation	Player
3	DF	BUL	Vladimir Bayrev (Free agent)
5	DF	BUL	Angel Rahov (on loan from Botev Plovdiv)
15	FW	BUL	Tsvetelin Chunchukov (on loan from Botev Plovdiv)
19	MF	BUL	Venstislav Gyuzelev (on loan from Botev Plovdiv)
—	GK	BUL	Filip Dimitrov (on loan from Botev Plovdiv)
—	DF	BUL	Vladimir Aytov (on loan from Botev Plovdiv)
—	GK	BUL	Filip Dimitrov (on loan from Botev Plovdiv)
—	DF	BUL	Radoslav Terziev (on loan from Botev Plovdiv)
—	DF	BUL	Lazar Marin (on loan from Botev Plovdiv)
—	MF	BUL	Bozhidar Vasev (on loan from Botev Plovdiv)
—	MF	BUL	Serkan Yusein (on loan from Botev Plovdiv)
—	MF	BUL	Borimir Karamfilov (on loan from Botev Plovdiv)
—	MF	BUL	Lachezar Angelov (on loan from Botev Plovdiv)
—	MF	BUL	Emil Kamberov (on loan from Botev Plovdiv)

Out:

No.	Pos.	Nation	Player
99	DF	BUL	Ivan Ploshtakov (released)

=== Spartak Varna ===
In:

No.	Pos.	Nation	Player
5	DF	BUL	Ivaylo Rusev (from Etar 1924)
6	MF	BUL	Dzihat Kyamil (Free agent)
7	FW	BUL	Blagoy Paskov (from Svetkavitsa)
13	FW	BUL	Ronald Donev (from Svetkavitsa)
21	MF	BUL	Viktor Mitev (Free agent)
31	GK	BUL	Nikolay Bankov (Free agent)

Out:

No.	Pos.	Nation	Player
1	GK	BUL	Genko Slavov (released)
2	DF	BUL	Kristian Radev (released)
5	DF	BUL	Ventsislav Marinov (released)
7	FW	BUL	Georgi Filipov (released)
8	MF	BUL	Georgi Dimitrov (released)
10	MF	BUL	Dian Kateliev (released)
14	MF	BUL	Dimo Dimov (released)
15	DF	BUL	Boyan Iliev (released)
16	DF	BUL	Filip Kostadinov (released)
18	FW	BUL	Ivan Tsachev (to Dobrudzha)
20	MF	BUL	Dragomir Kazakov (released)
21	FW	BUL	Enyo Krastovchev (released)
22	MF	BUL	Emil Martinov (released)
28	DF	BUL	Ignat Damyanov (released)
31	GK	BUL	Miroslav Markov (released)
33	FW	BUL	Viktor Dragolov (released)
55	DF	BUL	Stanislav Ivanov (released)

=== Vitosha Bistritsa ===
In:

No.	Pos.	Nation	Player

Out:

No.	Pos.	Nation	Player
