= List of Bulgarian football transfers winter 2013–14 =

This is a list of Bulgarian football transfers for the 2013–14 winter transfer window. Only transfers involving a team from the A PFG and B PFG are listed. The window will close at midnight on 28 February 2014. Players without a club may join one at any time, either during or in between transfer windows.

== A PFG ==
=== Beroe ===
In:

No.	Pos.	Nation	Player
2	DF	BUL	Iliya Munin (from Lyubimets 2007)
8	MF	BUL	Samir Ayass (from Lyubimets 2007)
9	FW	BUL	Stanislav Kostov (from Botev Plovdiv)
13	MF	BUL	Nikolay Chipev (from Neftochimic Burgas)
17	MF	FRA	Salim Kerkar (Free agent)
30	FW	COD	Junior Mapuku (from (France) AFC Compiègne)
88	FW	BUL	Viktor Shishkov (from (Armenia) Alashkert)
92	MF	MKD	Stefan Spirovski (from (Serbia) Borac Čačak)

Out:

No.	Pos.	Nation	Player
2	DF	BUL	Zdravko Iliev (to CSKA Sofia)
4	DF	BUL	Kostadin Stoyanov (released)
10	FW	BUL	Ventsislav Hristov (on loan to (Ukraine) Metalurh Donetsk)
13	MF	BRA	Evandro Roncatto (to (Greece) Niki Volos)
17	MF	BUL	Plamen Krumov (to Levski Sofia)
19	MF	BUL	Martin Raynov (on loan to Bansko)
88	MF	POR	David Caiado (to (Ukraine) Tavriya Simferopol)
91	MF	ALG	Amir Sayoud (to (Tunisia) CS Sfaxien)
92	MF	BUL	Ivan Goranov (to Litex Lovech)

=== Botev Plovdiv ===
In:

No.	Pos.	Nation	Player
3	FW	CGO	Férébory Doré (from (Romania) Petrolul Ploiești)
4	DF	ROU	Srdjan Luchin (from (Romania) Dinamo București)
6	DF	ROU	Alexandru Benga (from (Romania) Petrolul Ploiești)
8	MF	ROU	Alexandru Curtean (from (Romania) Dinamo București)
9	FW	TUN	Hamza Younés (from (Romania) Petrolul Ploiești)
24	DF	BUL	Dimitar Vezalov (from Levski Sofia)
27	GK	BUL	Iliya Nikolov (on loan from Rakovski)

Out:

No.	Pos.	Nation	Player
3	DF	SLO	Elvedin Džinić (to (Poland) Zagłębie Lubin)
5	DF	MKD	Boban Grnčarov (to (Ukraine) Tavriya Simferopol)
6	MF	BUL	Kostadin Dyakov (to Master Burgas)
8	MF	BUL	Todor Nedelev (to (Germany) Mainz 05)
15	FW	BUL	Valeri Domovchiyski (to Cherno More)
18	FW	BUL	Stanislav Kostov (to Beroe Stara Zagora)
33	GK	BUL	Rosen Andonov (on loan to Rakovski)
71	MF	BUL	Boris Galchev (to CSKA Sofia)

=== Cherno More ===
In:

No.	Pos.	Nation	Player
1	GK	BUL	Nik Dashev (from Chernomorets Burgas)
11	FW	BUL	Valeri Domovchiyski (from Botev Plovdiv)
30	MF	BUL	Dimo Atanasov (from Slavia Sofia)

Out:

No.	Pos.	Nation	Player
1	GK	BUL	Emil Mihaylov (to Marek Dupnitsa)
11	MF	BUL	Simeon Raykov (to Chernomorets Burgas)
15	DF	BUL	Aleksandar Aleksandrov (to Ludogorets Razgrad)
21	MF	BUL	Georgi Iliev (to (China) Shijiazhuang Yongchang)
23	MF	BUL	Daniel Mladenov (to Marek Dupnitsa)
55	DF	BUL	Rosen Kolev (to Lyubimets 2007)

=== Chernomorets Burgas ===
In:

No.	Pos.	Nation	Player
1	GK	SRB	Mladen Živković (from (Serbia) Donji Srem)
3	DF	BUL	Martin Dimov (from Vitosha Bistritsa)
4	MF	BUL	Milen Vasilev (from Slavia Sofia)
10	FW	GHA	Godfred Bekoé (from (Cyprus) Olympiakos Nicosia)
11	MF	BUL	Simeon Raykov (from Cherno More)
21	DF	MKD	Aleksandar Damčevski (from (Switzerland) SC Kriens)
32	GK	BUL	Stefano Kunchev (from Slavia Sofia)
45	MF	BUL	Slavcho Shokolarov (from Lyubimets 2007)
70	FW	BUL	Branimir Kostadinov (from Lokomotiv Sofia)

Out:

No.	Pos.	Nation	Player
1	GK	BUL	Nik Dashev (to Cherno More)
5	DF	BUL	Stoyan Kizhev (on loan to Master Burgas)
10	MF	POR	Marquinho (to (Romania) Vaslui)
12	GK	BUL	Yanko Georgiev (to Master Burgas)
13	MF	ALG	Najib Ammari (to (Romania) CFR Cluj)
24	DF	BUL	Martin Kavdanski (released)
26	MF	BUL	Nikolay Pavlov (loan return to Botev Plovdiv)
88	GK	BUL	Svilen Notev (to Nesebar)
89	DF	BRA	Oliveira (to (Brazil) Lajeadense)
90	FW	BUL	Petar Atanasov (loan return to Botev Plovdiv)
91	MF	FRA	Oussama Mrabet (released)
94	FW	CAF	Josué Balamandji (released)

=== CSKA Sofia ===
In:

No.	Pos.	Nation	Player
2	DF	BUL	Zdravko Iliev (from Beroe Stara Zagora)
4	MF	NGR	Sunny (from (Israel) Bnei Sakhnin)
7	MF	POR	Toni Silva (from (England) Barnsley)
8	MF	BUL	Boris Galchev (from Botev Plovdiv)
26	FW	ARG	Guido Di Vanni (from (Paraguay) Club Guaraní)
27	DF	ESP	Brian Herrero (from (Portugal) Braga B)
28	MF	SRB	Ivan Marković (from (Poland) Korona Kielce)
66	DF	BUL	Plamen Krachunov (from Lokomotiv Plovdiv)
73	FW	BUL	Ivan Stoyanov (from Ludogorets Razgrad)

Out:

No.	Pos.	Nation	Player
7	FW	MLI	Mamady Sidibé (released)
8	MF	BUL	Nikolay Dyulgerov (to (Kazakhstan) Spartak Semey)
9	FW	MKD	Hristijan Kirovski (to (Poland) GKS Bełchatów)
15	MF	ENG	Brian Howard (to (England) Birmingham City)
25	DF	BUL	Angel Granchov (to Lokomotiv Plovdiv)
27	DF	BUL	Ivo Raykov (to Minyor Pernik)
41	FW	POR	Bruno Moreira (loan return to (Portugal) Nacional)
42	DF	BUL	Hristo Martinski (released)
77	MF	BRA	Revson (loan return to (Portugal) Nacional)

=== Levski Sofia ===
In:

No.	Pos.	Nation	Player
3	DF	TUN	Aymen Belaïd (from Lokomotiv Plovdiv)
8	MF	BUL	Anton Ognyanov (from Lyubimets 2007)
10	FW	BUL	Valeri Bojinov (Free agent)
16	MF	BRA	Rafael Bastos (from (Saudi Arabia) Al Nassr)
17	DF	CZE	Pavel Čmovš (from (Netherlands) NEC Nijmegen)
21	MF	BUL	Radoslav Tsonev (loan return from Botev Vratsa)
28	MF	POR	Cristóvão Ramos (from (Turkey) Konyaspor)
40	DF	RSA	Ricardo Nunes (from (Slovakia) MŠK Žilina)
71	MF	BUL	Plamen Krumov (from Beroe Stara Zagora)

Out:

No.	Pos.	Nation	Player
5	DF	ESP	Álex Pérez (loan return to (Spain) Getafe)
10	MF	BUL	Antonio Vutov (to (Italy) Udinese)
11	MF	CPV	Garry Rodrigues (to (Spain) Elche)
13	DF	BUL	Dimitar Vezalov (to Botev Plovdiv)
17	FW	BUL	Todor Chavorski (to Loko Mezdra, previously on loan at Dobrudzha)
22	MF	BUL	Ilian Yordanov (to (Turkey) Denizlispor)
28	DF	POR	Nuno Pinto (to (Ukraine) Tavriya Simferopol)
55	DF	BUL	Yordan Miliev (to (North Macedonia) Shkëndija)

=== Litex Lovech ===
In:

No.	Pos.	Nation	Player
8	MF	BRA	Tom (on loan from (Turkey) İstanbul B.B.)
22	DF	BUL	Plamen Nikolov (from (Russia) Tom Tomsk)
23	DF	BUL	Ivan Goranov (from Beroe Stara Zagora)
70	MF	COL	Danilo Moreno (from (Colombia) Patriotas)

Out:

No.	Pos.	Nation	Player
2	DF	BUL	Kiril Dinchev (to (North Macedonia) Pelister)
7	MF	BRA	Vanger (to (Brazil) Tombense)
8	MF	BUL	Stanislav Genchev (to (Cyprus) AEL Limassol)
12	GK	BUL	Boyan Peykov (released)
13	DF	BUL	Ivelin Aladzhov (on loan to Dunav Ruse)
22	DF	BUL	Emil Grozev (on loan to Lyubimets 2007)
25	MF	BUL	Angel Zdravchev (on loan to Dunav Ruse)

=== Lokomotiv Plovdiv ===
In:

No.	Pos.	Nation	Player
5	DF	BUL	Tihomir Trifonov (Free agent)
6	DF	BUL	Angel Yoshev (from Neftochimic Burgas)
7	FW	BUL	Spas Delev (from (Spain) Las Palmas)
25	DF	BUL	Angel Granchov (from CSKA Sofia)
42	MF	TUN	Hamed Namouchi (from (Tunisia) Étoile du Sahel)
45	FW	FRA	Joseph Mendes (from (France) Le Mans)
88	MF	BUL	Georgi Korudzhiev (from Spartak Varna)

Out:

No.	Pos.	Nation	Player
1	GK	BUL	Bozhidar Stoychev (on loan to (North Macedonia) Rabotnički)
5	DF	GRE	Konstantinos Kaznaferis (to (Greece) Platanias)
6	DF	BUL	Plamen Krachunov (to CSKA Sofia)
10	MF	BUL	Todor Timonov (to (Greece) Anagennisi Karditsa)
25	DF	BUL	Ruslan Kuang (to Botev Vratsa)
50	FW	BRA	Gabriel do Carmo (released)
53	MF	BRA	Flávio Paulino (released)
75	DF	TUN	Aymen Belaïd (to Levski Sofia)
88	FW	BUL	Georgi Stefanov (to Lyubimets 2007)
99	FW	BUL	Andrey Atanasov (released)

=== Lokomotiv Sofia ===
In:

No.	Pos.	Nation	Player
9	MF	BUL	Daniel Genov (from (Azerbaijan) Inter Baku)
16	DF	BUL	Kamen Hadzhiev (Free agent)
26	MF	BUL	Ivo Ivanov (from Lyubimets 2007)
39	MF	TUN	Nabil Taïder (on loan from (Italy) Parma)
47	FW	BEL	Raoul Ngadrira (from (Belgium) La Louvière Centre)
88	MF	BUL	Petar Dimitrov (from Neftochimic Burgas)

Out:

No.	Pos.	Nation	Player
10	MF	BUL	Georg Vasilev (on loan to (Italy) Parma)
13	MF	ESP	Sota (released)
16	MF	BUL	Martin Dimitrov (to Master Burgas)
17	MF	BUL	Todor Hristov (to Akademik Svishtov)
18	DF	BUL	Aleksandar Dyulgerov (to Slavia Sofia)
19	MF	BUL	Dilyan Kolev (to (Montenegro) Mladost Podgorica)
47	DF	MNE	Milan Jovanović (released)
70	FW	BUL	Branimir Kostadinov (to Chernomorets Burgas)
76	FW	BUL	Krum Bibishkov (to Marek Dupnitsa)
77	MF	BUL	Daniel Peev (to (Kazakhstan) Spartak Semey)
91	FW	FRA	Cédric Baseya (released)

=== Ludogorets Razgrad ===
In:

No.	Pos.	Nation	Player
15	DF	BUL	Aleksandar Aleksandrov (from Cherno More)
95	MF	NED	Jeroen Lumu (from (Netherlands) Willem II)

Out:

No.	Pos.	Nation	Player
73	MF	BUL	Ivan Stoyanov (to CSKA Sofia)

=== Lyubimets 2007 ===
In:

No.	Pos.	Nation	Player
1	GK	BUL	Zdravko Chavdarov (Free agent)
3	DF	BUL	Emil Grozev (on loan from Litex Lovech)
4	DF	BUL	Petar Alyoshev (from Botev Vratsa)
6	DF	BUL	Rosen Kolev (from Cherno More)
7	MF	BUL	Georgi Valchev (from Neftochimic Burgas)
9	FW	BUL	Stefan Hristov (from Partizan Cherven Bryag)
10	MF	BUL	Mladen Stoev (from Dunav Ruse)
11	MF	BUL	Viktor Mitev (from Spartak Varna)
14	DF	BUL	Georgi Radev (from Dobrudzha Dobrich)
15	DF	BUL	Emil Argirov (from Oborishte)
19	FW	FRA	Albin Hodža (from Pirin Gotse Delchev)
20	MF	BUL	Ilian Kapitanov (Free agent)
22	FW	BUL	Georgi Stefanov (from Lokomotiv Plovdiv)
28	DF	BUL	Milen Kikarin (from Vitosha Bistritsa)

Out:

No.	Pos.	Nation	Player
1	GK	BUL	Tsvetomir Tsankov (released)
3	DF	BUL	Tanko Dyakov (released)
4	DF	BUL	Stilyan Nikolov (to Slivnishki geroi)
5	DF	BUL	Tsvetomir Panov (to Slavia Sofia)
6	MF	BUL	Samir Ayass (to Beroe Stara Zagora)
7	MF	BUL	Anton Ognyanov (to Levski Sofia)
9	FW	BUL	Miroslav Budinov (to (Greece) Ethnikos Gazoros)
10	MF	BRA	Mauro Alonso (released)
11	MF	BUL	Slavcho Shokolarov (to Chernomorets Burgas)
13	DF	BUL	Velichko Velichkov (to Slavia Sofia)
14	MF	BUL	Petar Stoyanov (released)
18	DF	BUL	Iliya Munin (to Beroe Stara Zagora)
19	MF	BUL	Yanko Angelov (to Montana)
20	MF	BUL	Doncho Atanasov (released)
22	DF	GRE	Eleftherios Sakellariou (released)
28	MF	BUL	Ivan Minchev (to Spartak Varna)
30	MF	BUL	Orlin Orlinov (released)

=== Neftochimic Burgas ===
In:

No.	Pos.	Nation	Player
1	GK	BUL	Daniel Zhelev (from Sozopol)
5	DF	BUL	Georgi Petkov (from Master Burgas)
7	MF	BUL	Simeon Mechev (from Botev Vratsa)
8	MF	BUL	Valentin Dobrevski (Free agent)
9	MF	BUL	Eray Karadayi (on loan from Levski Sofia)
23	DF	BUL	Stanislav Zhekov (from Master Burgas)
25	DF	BUL	Nikolay Kostov (from Nesebar)
35	FW	BUL	Diyan Malchev (from Ticha Dolni Chiflik)
69	DF	BUL	Chris Yonev (Free agent)
90	GK	BUL	Kostadin Georgiev (Free agent)

Out:

No.	Pos.	Nation	Player
2	DF	FRA	Kevin Coulibaly (released)
3	DF	BUL	Angel Yoshev (to Lokomotiv Plovdiv)
7	MF	BUL	Hristo Lemperov (to Master Burgas)
8	MF	BUL	Stamen Angelov (to Rakovski)
9	FW	BUL	Vasil Kaloyanov (to Master Burgas)
12	GK	BUL	Petar Denchev (to Spartak Varna)
16	DF	BUL	Anton Dimitrov (to Suvorovo)
17	MF	BUL	Tsvetan Iliev (to Svetkavitsa)
18	MF	BUL	Deyan Hristov (to Spartak Varna)
22	MF	BUL	Tsvetomir Tsonkov (to Master Burgas)
23	FW	BUL	Gerasim Zakov (to Bansko)
25	MF	BUL	Nikolay Chipev (to Beroe Stara Zagora)
27	MF	BUL	Georgi Valchev (to Lyubimets 2007)
28	DF	BUL	Martin Sechkov (to Pirin Razlog)
35	DF	BUL	Anton Vergilov (to Oborishte)
69	DF	BUL	Georgi Hashev (to Sozopol)
74	DF	BUL	Petar Patev (to Spartak Varna)
88	MF	BUL	Petar Dimitrov (to Lokomotiv Sofia)

=== Pirin Gotse Delchev ===
In:

No.	Pos.	Nation	Player
2	DF	BUL	Zefir Katunchev (from Mesta Hadzhidimovo)
4	DF	BUL	Georgi Samokishev (from Pirin Blagoevgrad)
14	MF	BUL	Lyubomir Vitanov (Free agent)
15	DF	BUL	Dimitar Krushovski (from Mesta Hadzhidimovo)
16	FW	BUL	Ognyan Stefanov (Free agent)
18	MF	BUL	Rumen Lapantov (Free agent)
30	MF	BRA	Eli Marques (from Montana)

Out:

No.	Pos.	Nation	Player
3	DF	BUL	Dimitar Pirgov (to Slavia Sofia)
6	DF	BUL	Atanas Fidanin (to Lokomotiv GO)
7	FW	FRA	Albin Hodža (to Lyubimets 2007)
8	MF	BUL	Petar Lazarov (to Montana)
10	MF	BUL	Veselin Marchev (to Slavia Sofia)
16	FW	BUL	Serafim Mihaylov (to Spartak Plovdiv)
18	MF	BUL	Daniel Vasev (to Botev Vratsa)
20	MF	MKD	Dragi Kotsev (to Pirin Blagoevgrad)
22	DF	BUL	Anton Kirov (to Minyor Pernik)
30	DF	BUL	Ivan Stoyanov (released)
88	FW	BUL	Georgi Petrov (to Gigant Saedinenie)

=== Slavia Sofia ===
In:

No.	Pos.	Nation	Player
3	DF	BUL	Velichko Velichkov (from Lyubimets 2007)
4	DF	MKD	Kire Ristevski (from (Albania) Bylis Ballsh)
6	DF	BUL	Dimitar Pirgov (from Pirin Gotse Delchev)
7	FW	BUL	Rangel Abushev (Free agent)
17	MF	BUL	Veselin Marchev (from Pirin Gotse Delchev)
18	MF	SLO	Tadej Apatič (from (Slovenia) Olimpija Ljubljana)
25	DF	BUL	Tsvetomir Panov (from Lyubimets 2007)
26	DF	BUL	Aleksandar Dyulgerov (from Lokomotiv Sofia)

Out:

No.	Pos.	Nation	Player
2	DF	CMR	Albert Baning (to (France) Sedan)
3	DF	BUL	Zhivko Zhelev (to Vereya Stara Zagora)
4	MF	BUL	Milen Vasilev (to Chernomorets Burgas)
7	MF	BUL	Hristo Yanev (released)
9	FW	BUL	Atanas Kurdov (to (Kazakhstan) Astana)
10	MF	SRB	Pavle Popara (to (Poland) Pogoń Szczecin)
17	DF	BUL	Dimo Atanasov (to Cherno More)
22	DF	BUL	Viktor Genev (to (Kazakhstan) Spartak Semey)
26	MF	BUL	Bogomil Hristov (to Slivnishki geroi)
32	GK	BUL	Stefano Kunchev (to Chernomorets Burgas)
75	MF	FRA	Plaisir Bahamboula (released)
99	FW	BRA	Diego Neves (to (Brazil) Fortaleza)

== B PFG ==
=== Akademik Svishtov ===
In:

No.	Pos.	Nation	Player
9	FW	BUL	Ivan Yanchev (Free agent)
17	DF	BUL	Ignat Damyanov (Free agent)
21	DF	BUL	Tsvetomir Genov (Free agent)
—	FW	BUL	Stoyan Kadifchin (Free agent)
—	DF	BUL	Lyubomir Despotov (Free agent)
—	MF	BUL	Stefan Traykov (Free agent)
—	MF	JPN	Koichiro Iizuka (Free agent)

Out:

No.	Pos.	Nation	Player

=== Bansko ===
In:

No.	Pos.	Nation	Player

Out:

No.	Pos.	Nation	Player

=== Botev Galabovo ===
In:

No.	Pos.	Nation	Player

Out:

No.	Pos.	Nation	Player
2	DF	BUL	Vasil Botev (released)
24	MF	BUL	Smilen Zlatanov (released)

=== Botev Vratsa ===
In:

No.	Pos.	Nation	Player
2	DF	BUL	Simeon Ivanov (Free agent)
3	DF	ITA	Edoardo Zita (Free agent)
4	DF	BUL	Daniel Vasev (Free agent)
10	MF	BUL	Vladislav Romanov (Free agent)
15	DF	BUL	Emanuil Borisov (Free agent)
17	MF	BUL	Tsvetomir Valeriev (Free agent)
22	MF	BUL	Nigel Yanislavov (Free agent)
23	MF	BUL	Yordan Apostolov (Free agent)

Out:

No.	Pos.	Nation	Player
2	DF	BUL	Zhivko Gospodinov (released)
3	DF	BUL	Daniel Bozhkov (released)
4	DF	BUL	Petar Alyoshev (released)
5	MF	BUL	Nikolay Nikolov (released)
12	DF	BUL	Vladimir Bayrev (released)
15	DF	BUL	Georgi Pavlov (released)
17	MF	BUL	Plamen Iliev (loan return to Levski Sofia)
18	MF	BUL	Simeon Mechev (released)
20	MF	BUL	Aleksandar Kirov (released)
22	MF	BUL	Kristiyan Dimitrov (released)
31	GK	BUL	Ivaylo Yanachkov (released)

=== Dobrudzha ===
In:

No.	Pos.	Nation	Player
9	FW	BUL	Ivelin Vasilev (Free agent)
31	MF	BUL	Krasimir Stanoev (on loan from Litex Lovech)

Out:

No.	Pos.	Nation	Player
2	DF	BUL	Georgi Radev (released)
10	FW	BUL	Kristiyan Petkov (loan return to Litex Lovech)
20	DF	BUL	Angel Madzhirov (released)
31	DF	BUL	Nikolay Iliev (released)

=== Dunav 2010 ===
In:

No.	Pos.	Nation	Player
3	DF	BUL	Ventsislav Yordanov (Free agent)
7	MF	BUL	Vladimir Baharov (Free agent)
10	MF	BUL	Hristo Kirev (Free agent)
13	DF	BUL	Ivelin Aladzhov (on loan from Litex Lovech)
14	MF	BUL	Kostadin Kaftanov (Free agent)
15	MF	BUL	Veselin Vasilev (Free agent)
17	MF	BUL	Ivaylo Lazarov (Free agent)
19	FW	BUL	Kristiyan Petkov (on loan from Litex Lovech)
—	MF	BUL	Angel Zdravchev (on loan from Litex Lovech)

Out:

No.	Pos.	Nation	Player

=== Haskovo 2009 ===
In:

No.	Pos.	Nation	Player
1	GK	BUL	Nikolay Bankov (Free agent)
18	FW	BUL	Yavor Vandev (Free agent)

Out:

No.	Pos.	Nation	Player
1	GK	BUL	Vasil Hristov (released)

=== Kaliakra ===
In:

No.	Pos.	Nation	Player
2	DF	BUL	Nikolay Iliev (Free agent)
12	MF	BUL	Plamen Kozhuharov (Free agent)
16	DF	BUL	Nikolay Zlatanov (Free agent)

Out:

No.	Pos.	Nation	Player
11	MF	BUL	Georgi Dimitrov (released)
12	DF	BUL	Pavlin Ivanov (released)
16	MF	BUL	Mustafa Mustafa (released)
26	FW	CMR	Fabrice Fauca (released)

=== Marek 2010 ===
In:

No.	Pos.	Nation	Player
1	GK	BUL	Emil Mihaylov (Free agent)
4	FW	BUL	Krum Bibishkov (Free agent)
5	DF	BUL	Ventsislav Bonev (Free agent)

Out:

No.	Pos.	Nation	Player

=== Montana ===
In:

No.	Pos.	Nation	Player
4	DF	BUL	Kristiyan Zdravkov (Free agent)
13	DF	BUL	Nikolay Nikolov (Free agent)
19	DF	BUL	Dian Moldovanov (Free agent)

Out:

No.	Pos.	Nation	Player
3	DF	BUL	Ivan Mihov (released)
4	DF	BUL	Georgi Georgiev (released)
9	FW	BUL	Miroslav Antonov (to (Israel) Maccabi Yavne)
13	FW	BUL	Boyan Gaytanov (released)
18	MF	BUL	Nikola Mitsanski (released)
19	FW	BUL	Kristiyan Metodiev (released)

=== Pirin Razlog ===
In:

No.	Pos.	Nation	Player
77	MF	BUL	Yordan Yurukov (Free agent)

Out:

No.	Pos.	Nation	Player
4	DF	BUL	Aleksandar Dyulgerov (released)
10	MF	BUL	Krasimir Stanoev (loan return to Litex Lovech)
11	MF	BUL	Asen Nikolov (released)
12	GK	BUL	Ivaylo Krusharski (released)
25	FW	SRB	Dušan Deljanin (released)

=== Rakovski 2011 ===
In:

No.	Pos.	Nation	Player

Out:

No.	Pos.	Nation	Player

=== Spartak Varna ===
In:

No.	Pos.	Nation	Player
1	GK	BUL	Petar Denchev (from Neftochimic Burgas)
3	DF	BUL	Stanislav Georgiev (Free agent)
4	DF	BUL	Kristiyan Radev (Free agent)
7	MF	BUL	Ivan Minchev (Free agent)
8	MF	BUL	Georgi Dimitrov (Free agent)
12	GK	BUL	Genko Slavov (Free agent)
14	MF	BUL	Iliyan Nedelchev (Free agent)
16	MF	BUL	Valentin Veselinov (Free agent)
18	FW	BUL	Deyan Hristov (from Neftochimic Burgas)
19	DF	BUL	Petar Patev (from Neftochimic Burgas)
20	DF	BUL	Trayan Dyankov (Free agent)
21	DF	BUL	Radomir Todorov (Free agent)
23	FW	BUL	Vladislav Mirchev (Free agent)

Out:

No.	Pos.	Nation	Player
1	GK	BUL	Radosvet Hristov (released)
8	MF	BUL	Georgi Korudzhiev (released)
16	MF	BUL	Emil Nikolov (released)
22	MF	BUL	Beadir Beadirov (released)
23	FW	BUL	Simeon Ganchev (released)
31	GK	BUL	Nikolay Bankov (released)

=== Vitosha Bistritsa ===
In:

No.	Pos.	Nation	Player
—	DF	BUL	Martin Dechev (Free agent)
—	DF	BUL	Georgi Pavlov (Free agent)
—	DF	BUL	Georgi Stoichkov (on loan from Levski Sofia)
—	DF	BUL	Hristo Popadiyn (on loan from Levski Sofia)
—	MF	BUL	Georgi Amzin (Free agent)
—	MF	BUL	Kiril Atanasov (Free agent)
—	MF	BUL	Mihail Kisyov (Free agent)
—	FW	BUL	Georgi Netov (Free agent)
—	DF	BUL	Stefan Chilingirov (Free agent)

Out:

No.	Pos.	Nation	Player
2	MF	BUL	Dobri Dobrev (released)
4	MF	BUL	Nikolay Ivanov (released)
5	DF	BUL	Simeon Ivanov (released)
6	DF	BUL	Milen Kikarin (released)
10	MF	BUL	Nikola Yanachkov (released)
11	MF	BUL	Miroslav Todorov (released)
15	DF	BUL	Anton Petrov (released)
16	DF	BUL	Martin Dimov (released)
19	MF	BUL	Petar Petrov (released)
20	DF	BUL	Velizar Andonov (released)
22	MF	BUL	Ivan Georgiev (released)
25	DF	BUL	Dimitar Dimitrov (released)
99	FW	BUL	Kristiyan Kovachev (released)
