= Svetoslav Petrov =

Svetoslav Petrov may refer to:

- Svetoslav Petrov (footballer born 1978), former Bulgarian football midfielder
- Svetoslav Petrov (footballer born 1988), Bulgarian football midfielder for Lokomotiv Sofia
