= Diego Neves =

Brazilian footballer (born 1986)

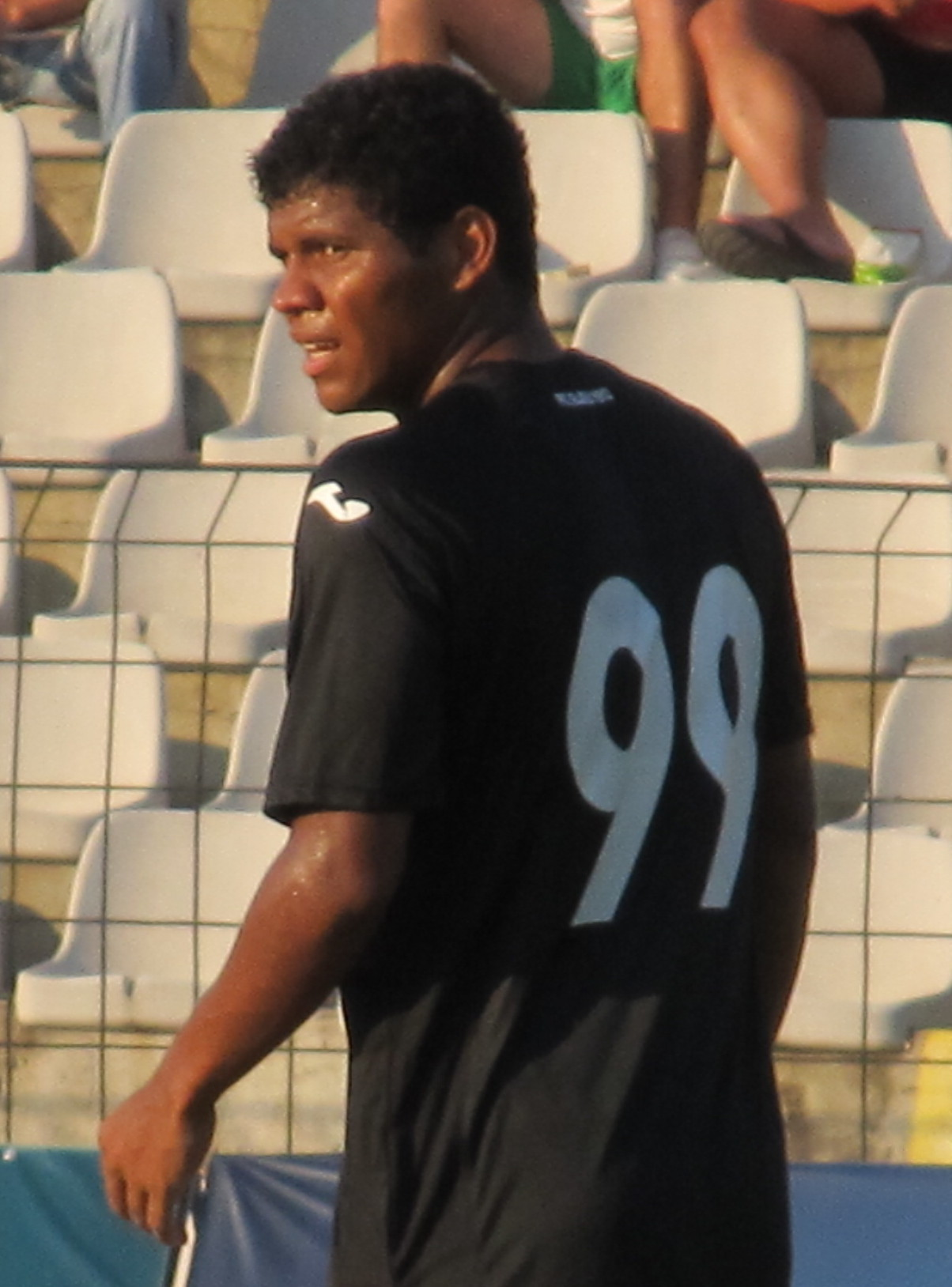

Personal information
- Full name: Diego Neves de Jesus
- Date of birth: June 13, 1986 (age 40)
- Place of birth: Serra, Brazil
- Height: 1.80 m (5 ft 11 in)
- Position: Forward

Team information
- Current team: Fortaleza

Senior career*
Years	Team	Apps	(Gls)
2006–2008	Serra	?	(?)
2009	Noroeste	0	(0)
2010	Oeste	2	(0)
2011	Americano	0	(0)
2011	Madureira	7	(3)
2012	Americano	0	(0)
2013	Confiança	0	(0)
2013	Slavia Sofia	7	(0)
2014–	Fortaleza		
- * Club domestic league appearances and goals as of December 12, 2013

Diego Neves de Jesus (born 13 June 1986) is a Brazilian footballer who plays as a forward.

== Career ==
In June 2013, Diego signed with Bulgarian side Slavia Sofia on a two-year deal. He was released some weeks after.

== Statistics ==
Professional Club Performance
Club	Season	League		State league		Cup		Continental		Total	
Club	Season	Apps	Goals	Apps	Goals	Apps	Goals	Apps	Goals	Apps	Goals
Noroeste	2009	0	0	2	0	0	0	–	–	2	0
Oeste	2010	2	0	0	0	0	0	–	–	2	0
Americano	2011	0	0	14	3	0	0	–	–	14	3
Madureira	2011	7	3	0	0	0	0	–	–	7	3
Americano	2012	0	0	12	5	0	0	–	–	12	5
Confiança	2013	0	0	6	2	1	0	–	–	7	2
Slavia Sofia	2013–14	0	0	–	–	0	0	–	–	0	0
Total		9	3	34	10	1	0	0	0	44	13
