= Oussama Mrabet =

French footballer (born 1993)

Personal information
- Date of birth: 10 July 1993 (age 33)
- Place of birth: Massy, France
- Height: 1.74 m (5 ft 8 1/2 in)
- Position: Midfielder

Youth career
- 2007–2011: Sochaux

Senior career*
Years	Team	Apps	(Gls)
2011–2012	ES Zarzis	0	(0)
2013	Chernomorets Burgas	3	(0)
- * Club domestic league appearances and goals as of 2 August 2013

Oussama Mrabet (born 10 July 1993) is a French footballer who plays as a midfielder. He appeared in the Bulgarian A PFG for Chernomorets Burgas.

== Career ==
In June 2013, Mrabet joined Chernomorets Burgas in Bulgaria. He made his debut on the opening day of the 2013–14 season, in a 1–0 home win over Cherno More Varna on 20 July, playing the full 90 minutes. Mrabet remained with Chernomorets until late October 2013.
