= Flávio Paulino =

Brazilian footballer (born 1989)

Personal information
- Full name: Flávio Paulino da Silva Filho
- Date of birth: 14 April 1989 (age 37)
- Place of birth: Santo André, Brazil
- Height: 1.85 m (6 ft 1 in)
- Position: Midfielder

Team information
- Current team: URT

Youth career
- 2006–2010: São Paulo

Senior career*
Years	Team	Apps	(Gls)
2010–2013	São Paulo	0	(0)
2010	→ Colo Colo (loan)	0	(0)
2011	→ Bragantino (loan)	1	(0)
2012	→ São Carlos (loan)	0	(0)
2013	→ Paulista (loan)	0	(0)
2013	Lokomotiv Plovdiv	5	(0)
2014–2016	Covilhã	23	(1)
2016–2017	Real Estelí	0	(0)
2017	Metropolitano	0	(0)
2017	São Paulo-RS	6	(0)
2018	Concórdia	0	(0)
2018	Camboriú		
2019	Ypiranga-RS	5	(0)
2020–	URT	0	(0)
- * Club domestic league appearances and goals as of 21:46, 8 August 2020 (UTC)

Flávio Paulino da Silva Filho (born 14 April 1989) is a Brazilian footballer who plays as a midfielder for União Recreativa dos Trabalhadores.

== Career ==
Flávio Paulino was born in Santo André.

On 22 July 2013, he signed with Lokomotiv Plovdiv in Bulgaria on a two-year deal.

== Career statistics ==
As of 1 November 2013

Professional Club Performance
Club	Season	League		State league		Cup		Continental		Total	
Club	Season	Apps	Goals	Apps	Goals	Apps	Goals	Apps	Goals	Apps	Goals
Colo Colo	2010	0	0	3	0	0	0	–	–	3	0
Bragantino	2011	1	0	0	0	0	0	–	–	1	0
São Carlos	2012	0	0	12	2	0	0	–	–	12	2
Paulista	2013	0	0	17	0	0	0	–	–	17	0
Lokomotiv Plovdiv	2013–14	5	0	–	–	0	0	–	–	5	0
Total		6	0	32	2	0	0	0	0	38	2
