= 2013–14 A Group =

90th season of top-tier football league in Bulgaria

A Group
- Season: 2013–14
- Dates: 19 July 2013 – 18 May 2014
- Champions: Ludogorets Razgrad (3rd title)
- Relegated: Lyubimets; Pirin Gotse Delchev; Neftochimic 1986; Chernomorets Burgas
- Champions League: Ludogorets Razgrad
- Europa League: Litex; CSKA Sofia; Botev Plovdiv
- Matches: 266
- Goals: 712 (2.68 per match)
- Top goalscorer: (Colombia) Wilmar Jordán; Martin Kamburov (20 goals each)
- Biggest home win: CSKA Sofia 7-0 Lyubimets (Saturday, 14 December)
- Biggest away win: Pirin Gotse Delchev 0-6 Lokomotiv Plovdiv (Wednesday, 11 December)
- Highest scoring: Botev Plovdiv 7-1 Pirin Gotse Delchev (Sunday, 28 July); Litex 6-2 Pirin Gotse Delchev (Saturday, 9 November)
- Longest winning run: Ludogorets Razgrad; Litex; CSKA Sofia; Beroe (6 games)
- Longest unbeaten run: Ludogorets Razgrad (17 games)
- Longest winless run: Lyubimets (20 games)
- Longest losing run: Lyubimets (15 games)

The 2013–14 A Group was the 90th season of the top division of the Bulgarian football league system, and 66th since a league format was adopted for the national competition of A Group as a top tier of the pyramid. The season started on 19 July 2013 with the opening game between Chernomorets and Cherno More; the season ended on 18 May 2014 with the last game between Ludogorets Razgrad and Cherno More.

For the first time after twelve years the competition was divided into two phases - Regular season, with every team playing against every other team twice, and Playoffs, with teams divided into Championship group (top seven) and Relegation group (bottom seven) to determine the champions and the relegated teams, respectively.

Ludogorets Razgrad went into the season as two-time defending champions and managed to retain the title for a third consecutive and overall time, after winning their match with Lokomotiv Plovdiv on 7 May two rounds before the end of the season.

== Competition format ==
Season 2013-14 has some changes in the tournament format compared to the previous season. For the first time since 2001–02 the championship is divided in two phases.

In the first phase, the Regular season, every team must play two times against each of the other teams on home-away basis for a subtotal of 26 matches.

In the second phase, the Play-offs, the teams are divided into Championship group (first seven) and Relegation group (bottom seven). In those two parallel played groups every team has to play two times, again on home-away basis, only against the remaining six teams in the group for a subtotal of 12 matches. Since there is an odd number of teams in each group (seven), each round of the Play-offs in a group consists only of three games between six teams, and the odd team does not play in the round. Hence, there are fourteen rounds in the second phase of the season, despite there being only twelve matches for each team of the two groups to play.

Thus, the season has a total of 40 rounds.

At the end of the season, the champion earns a place in the UEFA Champions League qualifying rounds, while the next two or three clubs in the final standings of Bulgaria's A PFG league table (depending on the winner of the 2013–14 Bulgarian Cup) earn the right to play in UEFA's Europa League qualifying rounds. The last four teams in the table (from 11th to 14th place) are directly relegated to B Group for the next season while only two clubs from the lower division are promoted, effectively reducing the number of teams in A Group for the next season by two - making the Bulgarian top football division to consist of 12 teams as of season 2014–15.

== Teams ==
A total of fourteen teams are contesting the league, including the best 12 sides from the previous 2012–13 season, plus two promoted clubs from the 2012–13 B Group.

As finishing in the bottom four places of the table at the end of season 2012–13, Botev Vratsa, Minyor Pernik, Montana and Etar 1924 were relegated to B Group and only two teams were promoted from B Group with the object of decreasing the number of teams from 16 to 14 only for the current season. Only Botev Vratsa and Montana joined the 2013-14 B Group. Etar and Minyor were not given licenses to compete due to financial problems.

The relegated teams were replaced by Neftochimic 1986, the 2012–13 B Group champions and Lyubimets, the 2012–13 B Group runner-up. On 8 May 2013 Neftochimic 1986 earned promotion after winning their match against Shumen 2010 with result of 3:1 and returned to A Group after seven years of absence. Their participation in A Group will include the Burgas derby between them and Chernomorets. Lyubimets on the other hand made their debut in the highest level of Bulgarian football.

=== Stadia and locations ===
Note: Table lists in alphabetical order.

Location of teams in 2013–14 A Group
Sofia 2013–14 A Group football clubs

Team	Location	Stadium	Capacity (seating)
Beroe	Stara Zagora	Beroe	12,128
Botev	Plovdiv	Hristo Botev	18,000 (13 000)
Cherno More	Varna	Ticha	8,250
Chernomorets	Burgas	Lazur	18,037
CSKA	Sofia	Balgarska Armiya	22,015 (11 400)
Levski	Sofia	Georgi Asparuhov	29,200 (19 000)
Litex	Lovech	Lovech	8,100
Lokomotiv	Plovdiv	Lokomotiv	10,000
Lokomotiv	Sofia	Lokomotiv Sofia	22,000 (6000)
Ludogorets	Razgrad	Ludogorets Arena	6,000
Lyubimets	Lyubimets	Gradski	4,000
Neftochimic	Burgas	Nesebar	7,000
Pirin	Gotse Delchev	Gradski	5,000
Slavia	Sofia	Ovcha Kupel	15,992

=== Personnel and sponsoring ===
Note: Flags indicate national team as has been defined under FIFA eligibility rules. Players and Managers may hold more than one non-FIFA nationality.

Team	Manager	Captain	Kit manufacturer	Shirt sponsor
Beroe Stara Zagora	(Bulgaria) Petar Hubchev	(Bulgaria) Georgi Andonov	Joma	BEROE
Botev Plovdiv	(Bulgaria) Stanimir Stoilov	(Bulgaria) Ivan Tsvetkov	Uhlsport	KTB AD
Cherno More Varna	(Bulgaria) Georgi Ivanov	(Bulgaria) Georgi Iliev	Joma	Armeets
Chernomorets Burgas	(Bulgaria) Dimitar Dimitrov	(North Macedonia) Vančo Trajanov	Sportika	—
CSKA Sofia	(Bulgaria) Stoycho Mladenov	(Bulgaria) Valentin Iliev	Legea	—
Levski Sofia	(Bulgaria) Elin Topuzakov	(Bulgaria) Stanislav Angelov	Puma	M-tel
Litex Lovech	(Serbia) Miodrag Ješić	(Bulgaria) Simeon Slavchev	adidas	Prima
Lokomotiv Plovdiv	(Bulgaria) Aleksandar Stankov	(Bulgaria) Zdravko Lazarov	Uhlsport	—
Lokomotiv Sofia	(Bulgaria) Dimitar Vasev	(Bulgaria) Marquinhos	Joma	Casa Boyana
Ludogorets Razgrad	(Bulgaria) Stoycho Stoev	(Bulgaria) Svetoslav Dyakov	adidas	Navibulgar
Lyubimets 2007	(Bulgaria) Krasimir Mechev	(Bulgaria) Anton Ognyanov	adidas	—
Neftochimic Burgas	(Bulgaria) Zlatko Yankov	(Bulgaria) Stanislav Zhekov	Krasiko	—
Pirin Gotse Delchev	(Bulgaria) Kostadin Angelov	(Bulgaria) Petar Lazarov	Erreà	—
Slavia Sofia	(Bulgaria) Milen Radukanov	(Bulgaria) Georgi Petkov	Joma	—

== First phase ==
The first 26 Rounds comprise the first phase of the season, also called the Regular season. In the first phase, every team plays each other team twice on a home-away basis till all the teams have played two matches against each other. The table standings at the end of the Regular season determine the group in which each team is going to play in the Play-offs.

=== League table ===
Pos	Team	Pld	W	D	L	GF	GA	GD	Pts	Qualification
1	Ludogorets Razgrad	26	18	4	4	57	14	+43	58	Qualification for championship group
2	Litex Lovech	26	17	6	3	59	26	+33	57	Qualification for championship group
3	CSKA Sofia	26	15	6	5	44	14	+30	51	Qualification for championship group
4	Botev Plovdiv	26	13	7	6	45	21	+24	46	Qualification for championship group
5	Lokomotiv Plovdiv	26	14	3	9	43	31	+12	45	Qualification for championship group
6	Levski Sofia	26	13	5	8	45	24	+21	44	Qualification for championship group
7	Cherno More	26	12	7	7	31	21	+10	43	Qualification for championship group
8	Beroe	26	11	6	9	32	25	+7	39	Qualification for relegation group
9	Slavia Sofia	26	8	7	11	35	38	−3	31 (Note: Slavia Sofia ahead of Lokomotiv Sofia on head-to-head record; Slavia Sofia–Lokomotiv Sofia 3–1, Lokomotiv Sofia–Slavia Sofia 0–1.)	Qualification for relegation group
10	Lokomotiv Sofia	26	9	4	13	30	44	−14	31	Qualification for relegation group
11	Chernomorets Burgas	26	6	4	16	30	46	−16	22	Qualification for relegation group
12	Lyubimets	26	5	3	18	18	66	−48	18	Qualification for relegation group
13	Pirin Gotse Delchev	26	4	3	19	23	71	−48	15	Qualification for relegation group
14	Neftochimic	26	3	3	20	15	66	−51	12	Qualification for relegation group

Source: A PFG (in Bulgarian)
Rules for classification: 1st points; 2nd head-to-head points; 3rd head-to-head goal difference; 4th head-to-head goals scored; 5th head-to-head away goals scored; 6th season goal difference; 7th season goals scored; 8th "sportsmanship" (R & Y cards); 9th draw

=== Results ===
Each team played against every other team for a total of 26 matches.

Home \ Away	BSZ	BOT	CHM	CHB	CSK	LEV	LIT	LPL	LSO	LUD	LYU	NEF	PGD	SLA
Beroe		1–0	0–0	1–1	1–1	1–0	2–3	3–0	0–1	0–1	5–0	2–0	2–1	2–1
Botev Plovdiv	0–0		2–0	6–1	2–1	2–1	2–1	2–0	4–1	2–2	1–2	4–0	7–1	3–2
Cherno More	1–1	1–0		2–0	2–1	2–1	1–2	1–0	2–2	3–1	2–0	2–1	2–1	0–0
Chernomorets Burgas	1–3	0–2	1–0		1–2	1–3	0–0	0–1	2–1	0–2	5–0	2–3	5–0	2–2
CSKA Sofia	1–0	0–0	0–0	3–0		3–0	1–0	0–0	5–0	0–2	7–0	4–0	2–0	3–0
Levski Sofia	0–0	1–0	1–1	2–0	0–1		4–1	1–2	0–0	0–2	3–0	6–0	4–1	2–2
Litex Lovech	3–0	0–0	2–1	3–1	0–0	1–1		2–1	4–0	0–0	2–1	4–1	6–2	1–1
Lokomotiv Plovdiv	3–1	0–0	1–0	1–1	1–0	2–3	2–5		3–1	0–1	5–0	2–0	2–0	3–1
Lokomotiv Sofia	1–0	3–2	0–2	2–1	1–1	1–0	0–2	1–2		1–2	1–0	5–0	2–0	0–1
Ludogorets Razgrad	3–0	0–0	1–1	1–0	3–0	0–1	2–4	3–0	4–0		5–1	4–0	5–0	4–0
Lyubimets	1–2	1–0	0–4	1–2	0–3	0–2	1–4	0–2	2–1	1–0		1–1	1–0	2–2
Neftochimic 1986	1–3	0–1	0–1	1–0	1–3	1–6	0–2	1–3	0–2	0–3	1–0		0–0	1–1
Pirin Gotse Delchev	1–0	1–1	1–0	2–3	0–1	0–2	1–5	0–6	2–2	0–3	5–2	3–2		1–3
Slavia Sofia	0–2	1–2	2–0	2–0	0–1	0–1	1–2	4–1	3–1	0–3	1–1	2–0	3–0	

Source: A PFG
Legend: Blue = home team win; Yellow = draw; Red = away team win.

=== Round by round ===
Round	1	2	3	4	5	6	7	8	9	10	11	12	13	14	15	16	17	18	19	20	21	22	23	24	25	26
Beroe (Stara Zagora)	W	D	L	D	D	L	W	L	W	L	L	W	D	W	L	W	W	D	L	W	L	D	W	L	W	W
Botev (Plovdiv)	W	W	D	L	W	W	D	W	L	W	D	W	L	L	D	W	L	W	W	W	D	D	L	D	W	W
Levski (Sofia)	L	L	W	D	D	D	W	L	W	W	W	D	L	W	W	W	L	W	L	W	W	W	W	D	L	L
Litex (Lovech)	W	W	D	W	D	W	D	D	L	W	W	W	W	W	W	L	W	L	W	W	W	D	W	W	W	D
Lokomotiv (Plovdiv)	D	W	W	L	L	W	W	L	W	L	W	W	W	W	L	L	W	L	W	W	D	W	L	W	D	L
Lokomotiv (Sofia)	D	L	L	W	L	D	L	W	D	L	W	D	W	W	L	W	L	L	L	L	W	L	L	W	W	L
Ludogorets (Razgrad)	L	W	W	W	W	W	L	W	W	W	D	W	L	W	W	W	W	W	W	D	L	W	W	D	W	D
Lyubimets 2007	W	L	W	W	W	L	L	L	D	L	L	L	L	L	D	L	W	L	L	L	L	D	L	L	L	L
Neftochimic 1986	L	W	W	D	L	L	L	L	L	L	L	L	D	L	D	W	L	L	L	L	L	L	L	L	L	L
Pirin (Gotse Delchev)	D	L	L	L	L	L	L	L	L	W	L	L	D	L	D	L	L	W	L	L	L	L	L	W	L	W
Slavia (Sofia)	L	D	L	D	W	L	W	D	D	D	L	L	L	L	W	L	W	W	L	W	L	D	W	D	L	W
CSKA (Sofia)	D	D	D	L	W	D	D	W	W	W	W	W	W	L	W	L	L	W	W	L	W	D	W	W	W	W
Cherno More (Varna)	L	D	D	W	D	D	W	W	D	L	W	L	W	W	L	W	L	D	W	D	W	W	W	L	L	W
Chernomorets (Burgas)	W	L	L	L	L	W	D	W	L	D	L	L	D	L	L	L	W	L	W	L	W	L	L	L	D	L

Source: sportal.bg
W = Win; D = Draw; L = Loss

=== Positions by round ===
Team ╲ Round	1	2	3	4	5	6	7	8	9	10	11	12	13	14	15	16	17	18	19	20	21	22	23	24	25	26
Beroe (Stara Zagora)	2	3	7	7	8	11	8	11	9	9	10	8	9	9	9	9	8	8	8	8	8	8	8	8	8	8
Botev (Plovdiv)	3	1	1	4	4	3	3	2	2	2	3	3	5	5	6	5	6	5	4	3	3	5	7	6	6	4
Levski (Sofia)	10	14	8	9	10	9	7	9	8	6	6	6	7	7	5	4	5	4	6	6	6	4	3	4	5	6
Litex (Lovech)	1	2	2	1	3	2	1	3	3	3	2	2	1	1	1	2	2	2	2	2	2	2	2	2	2	2
Lokomotiv (Plovdiv)	8	4	3	5	5	5	4	5	4	5	5	5	4	3	4	6	3	6	5	4	4	3	5	5	4	5
Lokomotiv (Sofia)	6	10	12	10	12	12	13	12	12	12	9	10	8	8	8	8	9	9	9	10	9	9	10	10	9	10
Ludogorets (Razgrad)	11	6	6	3	1	1	2	1	1	1	1	1	2	2	2	1	1	1	1	1	1	1	1	1	1	1
Lyubimets 2007	4	6	5	2	2	4	5	6	7	8	8	9	10	10	10	10	10	11	12	12	12	12	12	12	12	12
Neftochimic 1986	14	5	4	6	6	8	12	13	13	13	13	13	13	13	13	12	13	13	13	13	13	13	13	14	14	14
Pirin (Gotse Delchev)	6	11	13	14	14	14	14	14	14	14	14	14	14	14	14	14	14	14	14	14	14	14	14	13	13	13
Slavia (Sofia)	13	13	14	13	11	13	10	10	10	10	11	11	12	12	11	11	11	10	10	9	10	10	9	9	10	9
CSKA (Sofia)	8	9	9	12	7	6	9	7	5	4	4	4	3	4	3	3	4	3	3	5	5	6	4	3	3	3
Cherno More (Varna)	11	12	11	8	9	7	6	4	6	7	7	7	6	6	7	7	7	7	7	7	7	7	6	7	7	7
Chernomorets (Burgas)	4	8	10	11	13	10	11	8	11	11	12	12	11	11	12	13	12	12	11	11	11	11	11	11	11	11

= Championship group; = Relegation group

== Second phase ==
After the first 26 Rounds comprising the Regular season, the teams are divided into two groups of seven determined by their standings in the table at the end of the Regular season. The second phase is also referred to as the Play-offs. The teams in each group of the Play-offs again play on a home-away basis but only with the teams in their respective group. Hence, the total number of games each team has to play in this phase is 12 (twice with each of the other six teams in the group). Yet, since the number of teams in each group is odd (seven), each round of the second phase of the season consists of three games between six teams per group, and the odd team in the group does not play this round. Thus, there are 14 rounds in the Play-offs, despite there being only 12 matches a team has to play.

=== Championship group ===
The top seven teams at the end of the Regular season play in the Championship group to determine the champion for the season. Additionally, the teams in this group compete for the Bulgarian spots in UEFA's 2014-15 editions of Champions League and Europa League.

At the end of the Play-offs, the team placed first in the group can compete in the qualifying rounds of 2014–15 UEFA Champions League. The second and the third placed teams earn the right to compete in the qualifying rounds of 2014–15 UEFA Europa League. If the winner of the 2013–14 Bulgarian Cup is one of those top three teams, the fourth placed team in the group also earns a right to participate in the qualifying rounds of the Europa League.

Pos	Team	Pld	W	D	L	GF	GA	GD	Pts	Qualification
1	Ludogorets Razgrad (C)	38	25	9	4	74	20	+54	84	Qualification for Champions League second qualifying round
2	CSKA Sofia	38	21	9	8	56	20	+36	72 (Note: CSKA Sofia ahead of Litex Lovech on head-to-head points; CSKA Sofia: 10 pts, Litex Lovech: 1 pts.)	Qualification for Europa League second qualifying round
3	Litex Lovech	38	21	9	8	74	37	+37	72	Qualification for Europa League first qualifying round
4	Botev Plovdiv	38	18	11	9	57	32	+25	65	Qualification for Europa League first qualifying round
5	Levski Sofia	38	19	5	14	59	39	+20	62	
6	Cherno More	38	14	12	12	40	33	+7	54	
7	Lokomotiv Plovdiv	38	15	5	18	49	55	−6	50	

Source: A PFG (in Bulgarian)
Rules for classification: 1st points; 2nd head-to-head points; 3rd head-to-head goal difference; 4th head-to-head goals scored; 5th head-to-head away goals scored; 6th season goal difference; 7th season goals scored; 8th "sportsmanship" (R & Y cards); 9th draw
(C) Champions
Notes:

Results
Home \ Away	BOT	CHM	CSK	LEV	LIT	LPL	LUD
Botev Plovdiv		1–1	0–0	2–0	2–1	2–1	0–0
Cherno More	0–1		0–0	1–2	1–1	2–0	1–1
CSKA Sofia	2–0	2–0		1–0	2–0	1–1	0–1
Levski Sofia	2–0	1–0	1–3		1–2	2–1	2–3
Litex Lovech	3–0	0–0	0–1	0–1		3–0	0–0
Lokomotiv Plovdiv	0–3 (Note: The game was stopped in the 42 minute due to excessive amount of pyrotechnics used by Lokomotiv Plovdiv's fans. The game was not resumed as the conditions on the pitch and escalating unrest of Lokomotiv supporters obstructed the continuation of the game in "playable conditions". The BFU penalised the club of Lokomotiv Plovdiv with a 3-0 defeat for the game, scorewise.)	0–2	2–0	0–2	0–5		1–1
Ludogorets Razgrad	1–1	3–1	1–0	2–0	3–0	1–0	

Source: A PFG
Legend: Blue = home team win; Yellow = draw; Red = away team win.
Notes:

Results by round
Round	27	28	29	30	31	32	33	34	35	36	37	38	39	40
Botev (Plovdiv)	W	L	D	D	W	L		W	W	W	D	L	D	
Levski (Sofia)	L	W	W		W	L	L	L	L	W		W	L	W
Litex (Lovech)	D	L		L	L	W	W	D	D		L	W	W	L
Lokomotiv (Plovdiv)	L		L	L	D	L	W	L		L	L	L	L	D
Ludogorets (Razgrad)		W	W	D	D	W	D		D	W	D	W	W	W
CSKA (Sofia)	W	D	L	W		W	L	W	W	L	W		D	D
Cherno More (Varna)	D	D	D	W	L		D	D	L	L	W	L		L

Source: sportal.bg
W = Win; D = Draw; L = Loss

Positions by round
Round	27	28	29	30	31	32	33	34	35	36	37	38	39	40
Botev (Plovdiv)	4	4	5	4	4	4	4	4	4	4	4	4	4	4
Levski (Sofia)	6	5	4	5	5	5	5	5	5	5	5	5	5	5
Litex (Lovech)	2	2	2	3	3	3	2	2	2	3	3	3	2	3
Lokomotiv (Plovdiv)	5	6	7	7	7	7	7	7	7	7	7	7	7	7
Ludogorets (Razgrad)	1	1	1	1	1	1	1	1	1	1	1	1	1	1
CSKA (Sofia)	3	3	3	2	2	2	3	3	3	2	2	2	3	2
Cherno More (Varna)	7	7	6	6	6	6	6	6	6	6	6	6	6	6

= Champion; = Qualifies for Europa League

=== Relegation group ===
The bottom seven teams at the end of the Regular season play in the Relegation group to determine which four teams are relegated to B PFG for next season.

At the end of the Play-offs, the bottom four teams of this group will be directly relegated.

Pos	Team	Pld	W	D	L	GF	GA	GD	Pts	Relegation
8	Beroe	38	21	7	10	58	29	+29	70	
9	Slavia Sofia	38	16	7	15	57	46	+11	55	
10	Lokomotiv Sofia	38	16	6	16	46	52	−6	54	
11	Chernomorets Burgas (R)	38	13	5	20	56	62	−6	44	Relegation to 2014–15 B Group
12	Neftochimic 1986 (R)	38	7	4	27	26	92	−66	25	Relegation to 2014–15 B Group
13	Pirin Gotse Delchev (R)	38	6	4	28	35	91	−56	22	Relegation to 2014–15 B Group
14	Lyubimets (R)	38	6	3	29	25	104	−79	21	Relegation to 2014–15 B Group

Source: A PFG (in Bulgarian)
Rules for classification: 1st points; 2nd head-to-head points; 3rd head-to-head goal difference; 4th head-to-head goals scored; 5th head-to-head away goals scored; 6th season goal difference; 7th season goals scored; 8th "sportsmanship" (R & Y cards); 9th draw
(R) Relegated

Results
Home \ Away	BSZ	CHB	LSO	LYU	NEF	PGD	SLA
Beroe		3–0	1–0	4–1	3–0	2–1	1–0
Chernomorets Burgas	0–5		1–2	5–0	4–0	4–0	2–1
Lokomotiv Sofia	0–0	1–1		1–2	3–0	1–0	2–0
Lyubimets	0–4	0–4	0–2		1–2	1–2	1–2
Neftochimic 1986	1–0	2–3	0–2	3–1		2–1	0–3
Pirin Gotse Delchev	1–2	1–2	1–2	5–0	0–0		0–2
Slavia Sofia	0–1	1–0	2–0	4–0	5–1	2–0	

Source: A PFG
Legend: Blue = home team win; Yellow = draw; Red = away team win.

Results by round
Round	27	28	29	30	31	32	33	34	35	36	37	38	39	40
Beroe (Stara Zagora)		W	D	W	W	W	L		W	W	W	W	W	W
Lokomotiv (Sofia)	W	W	D	L		D	W	W	W	L	W		W	L
Lyubimets 2007	L		L	L	L	L	L	L		L	L	L	L	W
Neftochimic 1986	L	L	L	W	D		W	L	L	L	W	W		L
Pirin (Gotse Delchev)	L	L	W		D	L	L	L	L	W		L	L	L
Slavia (Sofia)	W	L		W	L	W	W	W	L		L	W	W	W
Chernomorets (Burgas)	W	W	W	L	W	D		W	W	W	L	L	L	

Source: sportal.bg
W = Win; D = Draw; L = Loss

Positions by round
Round	27	28	29	30	31	32	33	34	35	36	37	38	39	40
Beroe (Stara Zagora)	8	8	8	8	8	8	8	8	8	8	8	8	8	8
Lokomotiv (Sofia)	10	9	9	9	9	10	10	10	9	9	9	9	9	10
Lyubimets 2007	12	12	13	13	13	13	14	14	14	14	14	14	14	14
Neftochimic 1986	14	14	14	14	14	14	13	13	13	13	13	12	12	12
Pirin (Gotse Delchev)	13	13	12	12	12	12	12	12	12	12	12	13	13	13
Slavia (Sofia)	9	10	10	10	10	9	9	9	10	10	10	10	10	9
Chernomorets (Burgas)	11	11	11	11	11	11	11	11	11	11	11	11	11	11

= Relegated

== Season statistics ==
=== Top scorers ===
Rank	Scorer	Club	Goals
1	(Colombia) Wilmar Jordán	Litex Lovech	20
1	(Bulgaria) Martin Kamburov	Lokomotiv Plovdiv	20
3	(Bulgaria) Marquinhos	Lokomotiv Sofia	16
4	(Bulgaria) Simeon Slavchev	Litex Lovech	14
5	(Slovenia) Roman Bezjak	Ludogorets Razgrad	13
5	(Bulgaria) Georgi Andonov	Beroe Stara Zagora	13
7	(Cape Verde) Garry Rodrigues	Levski Sofia	11
7	(Bulgaria) Atanas Kurdov	Slavia Sofia	11
7	(Spain) Bacari	Cherno More Varna	11
7	(Bulgaria) Simeon Raykov	Chernomorets Burgas/Cherno More Varna	11

_{Updated on 18 May 2014}

=== Top assists ===
Rank	Player	Club	Assists
1	(Bulgaria) Zdravko Lazarov	Lokomotiv Plovdiv	12
2	(Albania) Armando Vajushi	Litex Lovech	9
2	(Cape Verde) Garry Rodrigues	Levski Sofia	9
4	(Brazil) Marcelinho	Ludogorets Razgrad	8
4	(Albania) Jurgen Gjasula	Litex Lovech	8
6	(Bulgaria) Martin Kamburov	Lokomotiv Plovdiv	7
7	(Serbia) Nemanja Milisavljević	CSKA Sofia	6
7	(Brazil) Marcinho	CSKA Sofia	6
7	(Bulgaria) Miroslav Manolov	Litex Lovech	6
10	(Bulgaria) Anton Karachanakov	CSKA Sofia	5
10	(Bulgaria) Galin Ivanov	Slavia Sofia	5

=== Hat-tricks ===
Player	For	Against	Result	Date
(Slovenia) Roman Bezjak^{4}	Ludogorets	Lyubimets	5–1	27 October 2013
(Bulgaria) Martin Kamburov	Lokomotiv Plovdiv	Lyubimets	5–0	29 September 2013
(Colombia) Wilmar Jordán	Litex	Lokomotiv Plovdiv	2–5	14 December 2013
(Bulgaria) Georgi Andonov	Beroe	Lyubimets	5–0	1 March 2014
(Bulgaria) Galin Ivanov	Slavia	Neftohimic	5–1	15 March 2014

^{4} Player scored 4 goals

=== Scoring ===
- First goal of the season: Petar Atanasov for Chernomorets against Cherno More (Friday, 19 July 2013)
- Fastest goal of the season: 27 seconds

Chris Gadi for Lokomotiv Plovdiv against CSKA (Saturday, 26 October);
Ivan Valchanov for Lyubimets against Pirin (Gotse Delchev) (Saturday, 23 November)

- Widest winning margin: 7 goals

CSKA (Sofia) 7-0 Lyubimets (Saturday, 14 December)

- Highest scoring game: 8 goals

Botev (Plovdiv) 7-1 Pirin (GD) (Sunday, 28 July)
Litex 6-2 Pirin (GD) (Saturday, 9 November)

- Most goals scored in a match by a single team: 7 goals

Botev (Plovdiv) 7-1 Pirin (GD) (Sunday, 28 July)
CSKA (Sofia) 7-0 Lyubimets (Saturday, 14 December)

=== Clean sheets ===
Club(s) with most clean sheets - 25
Ludogorets
Clubs with 24 clean sheets
CSKA Sofia
Clubs with 17 clean sheets
Beroe Stara Zagora

_{Updated to games played on 18 May 2014}

== Awards ==
=== Weekly awards ===
==== Player of the Round ====
Round	Player of the Round	
Round	Player	Club
Round 1	(Bulgaria) Todor Nedelev	Botev Plovdiv
Round 2	(Bulgaria) Martin Kamburov	Lokomotiv Plovdiv
Round 3	(Bulgaria) Nikolay Chipev	Neftochimic 1986
Round 4	(Bulgaria) Ivan Karadzhov	Beroe Stara Zagora
Round 5	(Colombia) Wilmar Jordán	Litex Lovech
Round 6	(Brazil) Marcelinho	Ludogorets Razgrad
Round 7	(Bulgaria) Georgi Bozhilov	Cherno More Varna
Round 8	(Madagascar) Anicet Abel	Botev Plovdiv
Round 9	(Bulgaria) Ivaylo Chochev	CSKA Sofia
Round 10	(Bulgaria) Ivaylo Chochev	CSKA Sofia
Round 11	(Bulgaria) Simeon Slavchev	Litex Lovech
Round 12	(Bulgaria) Emil Gargorov	CSKA Sofia
Round 13	(Bulgaria) Emil Gargorov	CSKA Sofia
Round 14	(France) Chris Gadi	Lokomotiv Plovdiv
Round 15	(Bulgaria) Simeon Slavchev	Litex Lovech
Round 16	(Slovenia) Roman Bezjak	Ludogorets Razgrad
Round 17	(Bulgaria) Simeon Slavchev	Litex Lovech
Round 18	(Bulgaria) Orlin Starokin	Levski Sofia
Round 19	(Bulgaria) Martin Petrov	CSKA Sofia
Round 20	(Colombia) Wilmar Jordán	Litex Lovech
Round 21	(Bulgaria) Plamen Iliev	Levski Sofia
Round 22	(Guinea) Larsen Toure	Levski Sofia
Round 23	(Colombia) Wilmar Jordán	Litex Lovech
Round 24	(Tunisia) Hamza Younes	Botev Plovdiv
Round 25	(Brazil) Tom	Lokomotiv Sofia
Round 26	(Bulgaria) Emil Gargorov	CSKA Sofia
Round 27	(Bulgaria) Plamen Krachunov	CSKA Sofia
Round 28	(Bulgaria) Georgi Andonov	Beroe Stara Zagora
Round 29	(Bulgaria) Milcho Angelov	Chernomorets Burgas
Round 30	(Bulgaria) Vladimir Gadzhev	Levski Sofia
Round 31	(Tunisia) Hamza Younes	Botev Plovdiv
Round 32	(Benin) Omar Kossoko	CSKA Sofia
Round 33	(Bulgaria) Zdravko Lazarov	Lokomotiv Plovdiv
Round 34	(Benin) Omar Kossoko	CSKA Sofia
Round 35	(Bulgaria) Emil Gargorov	CSKA Sofia
Round 36	(Netherlands) Jeroen Lumu	Ludogorets Razgrad
Round 37	(Benin) Omar Kossoko	CSKA Sofia
Round 38	(Colombia) Wilmar Jordán	Litex Lovech
Round 39	(Colombia) Sebastián Hernández	Ludogorets Razgrad
Round 40	(Bulgaria) Valeri Bojinov	Levski Sofia

== Transfers ==
- List of Bulgarian football transfers summer 2013
- List of Bulgarian football transfers winter 2013–14

== Attendances ==
#	Club	Average	Highest
1	CSKA Sofia	4,364	14,000
2	Botev	3,745	12,200
3	Ludogorets	3,100	6,000
4	Levski	2,924	9,900
5	Beroe	2,248	9,100
6	Cherno More	2,190	9,400
7	Lokomotiv Plovdiv	1,713	5,700
8	Lovech	1,439	5,900
9	Chernomorets	797	3,900
10	Pirin	751	2,300
11	Lyubimets	636	2,900
12	Neftochimic	589	1,500
13	Lokomotiv Sofia	451	1,900
14	Slavia Sofia	222	1,100
