= Viktor Dragolov =

Bulgarian footballer

Personal information
- Full name: Viktor Vasilev Dragolov
- Date of birth: 27 July 1988 (age 38)
- Place of birth: Stara Zagora, Bulgaria
- Height: 1.65 m (5 ft 5 in)
- Position: Winger

Youth career
- 2002–2007: Beroe Stara Zagora

Senior career*
Years	Team	Apps	(Gls)
2008–2009	Nesebar	0	(0)
2009–2011	Spartak Varna	42	(7)
2011	Dobrudzha Dobrich	7	(0)
2011–2012	Ethnikos Asteras	7	(0)
2012	Paniliakos	5	(0)
2013	Korinthos F.C.	15	(0)
- * Club domestic league appearances and goals as of 25 February 2013

Viktor Dragolov (Bulgarian: Виктор Драголов; born 27 July 1988) is a Bulgarian footballer currently playing as a winger.

== Career ==
Viktor Dragolov began playing football with Beroe Stara Zagora. He also played for Nesebar, Spartak Varna, Dobrudzha Dobrich, and Ethnikos Asteras.
