= Mouhamed Soly =

Senegalese footballer

Personal information
- Date of birth: 25 November 1989 (age 36)
- Place of birth: Dakar, Senegal
- Height: 1.85 m (6 ft 1 in)
- Position: Striker

Team information
- Current team: AS Cannes

Senior career*
Years	Team	Apps	(Gls)
2006–2008	Jeanne d'Arc	?	(?)
2008–2009	Guingamp B	20	(4)
2009–2013	Guingamp	22	(7)
2011	→ Amiens SC (loan)	8	(1)
2012	→ AS Cannes (loan)	13	(6)
2012	→ Vendée Poiré sur Vie (loan)	7	(1)
2013	→ Beauvais Oise (loan)	17	(9)
2013	Chernomorets Burgas	2	(0)
2014–	AS Cannes	8	(3)
- * Club domestic league appearances and goals as of 26 September 2013

Mouhamed Soly (born 25 November 1989 in Dakar) is a Senegalese footballer who plays as a forward.
