= Genko Slavov =

Bulgarian footballer

Personal information
- Full name: Genko Slavov Slavov
- Date of birth: 4 January 1981 (age 45)
- Place of birth: Varna, Bulgaria
- Height: 1.86 m (6 ft 1 in)
- Position: Goalkeeper

Team information
- Current team: Fratria (youth coach)

Youth career
- 1991–2000: Spartak Varna

Senior career*
Years	Team	Apps	(Gls)
2000–2003	Spartak Varna	7	(0)
2003–2004	CSKA Sofia	1	(0)
2004–2007	Spartak Varna	61	(0)
2008	Volov Shumen	11	(0)
2008	Kaliakra Kavarna	10	(0)
2009–2010	Volov Shumen	38	(0)
2010	Chernomorets Balchik	6	(0)
2011–2013	Spartak 1918	35	(0)
2013	Suvorovo		
2014	Spartak 1918	0	(0)

Managerial career
- 2023–2024: Fratria (Goalkeepers coach)
- 2025–: Fratria (Youth coach)
- * Club domestic league appearances and goals as of 13 May 2013

Genko Slavov Slavov (Bulgarian: Генко Славов Славов) (born 4 January 1981 in Varna) is a Bulgarian retired footballer and now goalkeepers youth coach at Fratria. He played as a goalkeeper.

== Career ==
Born in Varna, Slavov started his career as a 10-year-old at his hometown club, Spartak Varna. He was promoted from their youth team in June 2000. After two seasons as a third-choice keeper, behind Krasimir Kolev and Georgi Arnaudov, he made his debut during the 2002–03 season on 12 April 2003 in a 0–3 home loss against Slavia Sofia, coming on as a substitute for Kolev. Since his debut, Slavov has established himself as Spartak's first-choice goalkeeper.

In June 2003 Genko was snatched up by Bulgarian giants CSKA Sofia for a fee of a reported €50,000. In Sofia he was the fourth-choice keeper and earned just one appearance. Slavov's only league appearance of that season came in a 0–3 away loss against Cherno More Varna on 8 May 2004. Following Slavov's release from CSKA he returned to Spartak Varna after signing a three-year contract in June 2004.

== Statistics ==
As of 10 January 2011.

Club	Season	League		Cup		Europe		Total	
Club	Season	Apps	Goals	Apps	Goals	Apps	Goals	Apps	Goals
Spartak Varna	2000–01	0	0	0	0	–	–	0	0
Spartak Varna	2001–02	0	0	0	0	–	–	0	0
Spartak Varna	2002–03	7	0	0	0	–	–	7	0
CSKA Sofia	2003–04	1	0	0	0	0	0	1	0
Spartak Varna	2004–05	13	0	0	0	–	–	13	0
Spartak Varna	2005–06	26	0	0	0	–	–	26	0
Spartak Varna	2006–07	20	0	0	0	–	–	20	0
Spartak Varna	2007–08	2	0	0	0	–	–	2	0
Volov Shumen	2007–08	11	0	0	0	–	–	11	0
Kaliakra Kavarna	2008–09	10	0	0	0	–	–	10	0
Volov Shumen	2008–09	14	0	0	0	–	–	14	0
Volov Shumen	2009–10	24	0	1	0	–	–	25	0
Chernomorets Balchik	2010–11	6	0	1	0	–	–	7	0
Spartak Varna	2010–11	0	0	0	0	–	–	0	0
Career totals		134	0	2	0	0	0	136	0
