= Serafim Mihaylov =

Bulgarian footballer

Personal information
- Date of birth: 25 April 1995 (age 31)
- Place of birth: Plovdiv, Bulgaria
- Position: Forward

Team information
- Current team: Hebar Pazardzhik
- Number: 27

Youth career
- 2008–2011: Spartak Plovdiv
- 2012: Manchester City

Senior career*
Years	Team	Apps	(Gls)
2012–2013	Lokomotiv Plovdiv	5	(0)
2013	Pirin Gotse Delchev	4	(0)
2014	Spartak Plovdiv	?	(2)
2014	Oborishte	22	(10)
2015	Pirin Gotse Delchev	4	(1)
2016–2017	Eurocollege	?	(24)
2018–	Hebar Pazardzhik	20	(2)

International career
- Bulgaria U17
2012	Bulgaria U21	1	(0)
- * Club domestic league appearances and goals as of 17:03, 17 September 2017 (UTC)

Serafim Mihaylov (Bulgarian: Серафим Михайлов; born 25 April 1995) is a Bulgarian footballer, who currently plays as a forward for Hebar Pazardzhik in the Bulgarian V Group.

== Career ==
Born in Plovdiv, Mihaylov began his career playing for Spartak Plovdiv. In 2011, his player's rights were purchased by Serbian football agent Mirko Miličević for €5,000.

In January 2012, Mihaylov began a trial with English side Manchester City. In July he traveled with the first squad for a pre-season training camp in Austria.

On 26 October 2012, Mihaylov joined Lokomotiv Plovdiv. Five days later, he made his debut in a 0–0 home draw against Litex Lovech in the Bulgarian Cup second round, as a second-half substitute for Atanas Kurdov.
