= Tsvetomir Tsankov =

Bulgarian footballer

Personal information
- Full name: Tsvetomir Ivanov Tsankov
- Date of birth: 6 June 1984 (age 42)
- Place of birth: Lovech, Bulgaria
- Height: 1.85 m (6 ft 1 in)
- Position: Goalkeeper

Team information
- Current team: Etar Veliko Tarnovo

Youth career
- Levski Sofia

Senior career*
Years	Team	Apps	(Gls)
2005–2007	Dunav Ruse	12	(0)
2007–2009	Spartak Varna	36	(0)
2009	Montana	12	(0)
2010	Banants	2	(0)
2010–2011	Botev Vratsa	16	(0)
2011–2012	Etar 1924	28	(0)
2013	Neftochimic 1986	2	(0)
2013–2014	Lyubimets 2007	2	(0)
2014–2015	Dunav Ruse	19	(0)
2015–	Etar Veliko Tarnovo	23	(0)
- * Club domestic league appearances and goals as of 19 August 2021

Tsvetomir Tsankov (Bulgarian: Цветомир Цанков; born 6 June 1984 in Lovech) is a Bulgarian football goalkeeper who plays for Etar Veliko Tarnovo.
