= Anton Dimitrov (footballer, born 1979) =

Bulgarian footballer

Personal information
- Full name: Anton Mitkov Dimitrov
- Date of birth: 31 October 1979 (age 46)
- Height: 1.85 m (6 ft 1 in)
- Position: Centre back

Senior career*
Years	Team	Apps	(Gls)
2000–2004	Dobrudzha Dobrich	65	(4)
2005–2006	Maritsa Plovdiv	15	(0)
2006–2011	Kaliakra Kavarna	120	(3)
2012	Dobrudzha Dobrich	9	(0)
2012–2013	Svetkavitsa	25	(1)
2013	Neftochimic 1986	3	(0)
- * Club domestic league appearances and goals as of 30 October 2013

Anton Dimitrov (Bulgarian: Антон Димитров; born 31 October 1979) is a Bulgarian footballer who plays as a defender.
