= Milen Vasilev =

Bulgarian footballer

Personal information
- Full name: Milen Georgiev Vasilev
- Date of birth: 17 May 1988 (age 38)
- Place of birth: Botevgrad, Bulgaria
- Height: 1.71 m (5 ft 7 in)
- Position: Winger

Youth career
- Balkan Botevgrad

Senior career*
Years	Team	Apps	(Gls)
2009–2010	Botev Kozloduy	24	(9)
2010	Sliven 2000	12	(0)
2011–2012	Minyor Pernik	53	(7)
2013	Levski Sofia	3	(0)
2013	Slavia Sofia	11	(0)
2014	Chernomorets Burgas	12	(5)
2014	Marek	6	(1)
2015	Etar	2	(0)
2015–2016	Botev Vratsa	30	(10)
2016	Pelister	11	(0)
2017	Botev Vratsa	1	(0)
2018	Spartak Pleven	?	(?)
2018–2019	Bansko	?	(?)
- * Club domestic league appearances and goals

Milen Georgiev Vasilev (Bulgarian: Милен Василев; born 17 May 1988) is a Bulgarian footballer, who plays as a winger.

== Career ==
Vasilev played for Botev Vratsa during the 2016–17 season, but was released in March 2017 due to disciplinary issues. In March 2018, he joined North-West Third League side Spartak Pleven but was released at the end of the season.
