= Daniel Vasev =

Bulgarian footballer

Personal information
- Full name: Daniel Dimitrov Vasev
- Date of birth: 23 May 1994 (age 32)
- Place of birth: Sofia, Bulgaria
- Height: 1.75 m (5 ft 9 in)
- Position: Midfielder

Team information
- Current team: Rilski Sportist
- Number: 94

Youth career
- Slavia Sofia

Senior career*
Years	Team	Apps	(Gls)
2012–2013	Slavia Sofia	1	(0)
2013–2014	Pirin Gotse Delchev	4	(0)
2014	Botev Vratsa	10	(2)
2014–2015	Lokomotiv Sofia	7	(0)
2015–2016	Lokomotiv Mezdra	7	(0)
2016	Spartak Pleven	8	(1)
2016–2017	Botev Vratsa	2	(0)
2017	Lokomotiv Sofia	12	(1)
2017–2018	Montana	14	(2)
2018	Lokomotiv GO	3	(0)
2018–2019	Lokomotiv Sofia	14	(2)
2019	Arda	0	(0)
2019–2020	Sportist Svoge	12	(4)
2020–2021	Oborishte	10	(2)
2021–2022	Marek Dupnitsa	14	(0)
2022–2023	Kostinbrod	39	(6)
2023–	Rilski Sportist	4	(0)
- * Club domestic league appearances and goals as of 20 December 2021

Daniel Vasev (Bulgarian: Даниел Васев; born 23 May 1994) is a Bulgarian footballer who plays as a midfielder for Rilski Sportist.

He is a son of the former football player and now manager Dimitar Vasev.

== Career ==
In July 2016, Vasev signed with Botev Vratsa. He moved to Lokomotiv Sofia in January 2017.

In July 2017, Vasev joined Montana.

In February 2018, Vasev signed with Lokomotiv Gorna Oryahovitsa.} He left the club in April following a disagreement regarding bonus payments.
