= Josué Balamandji =

Central African Republic footballer (born 1989)

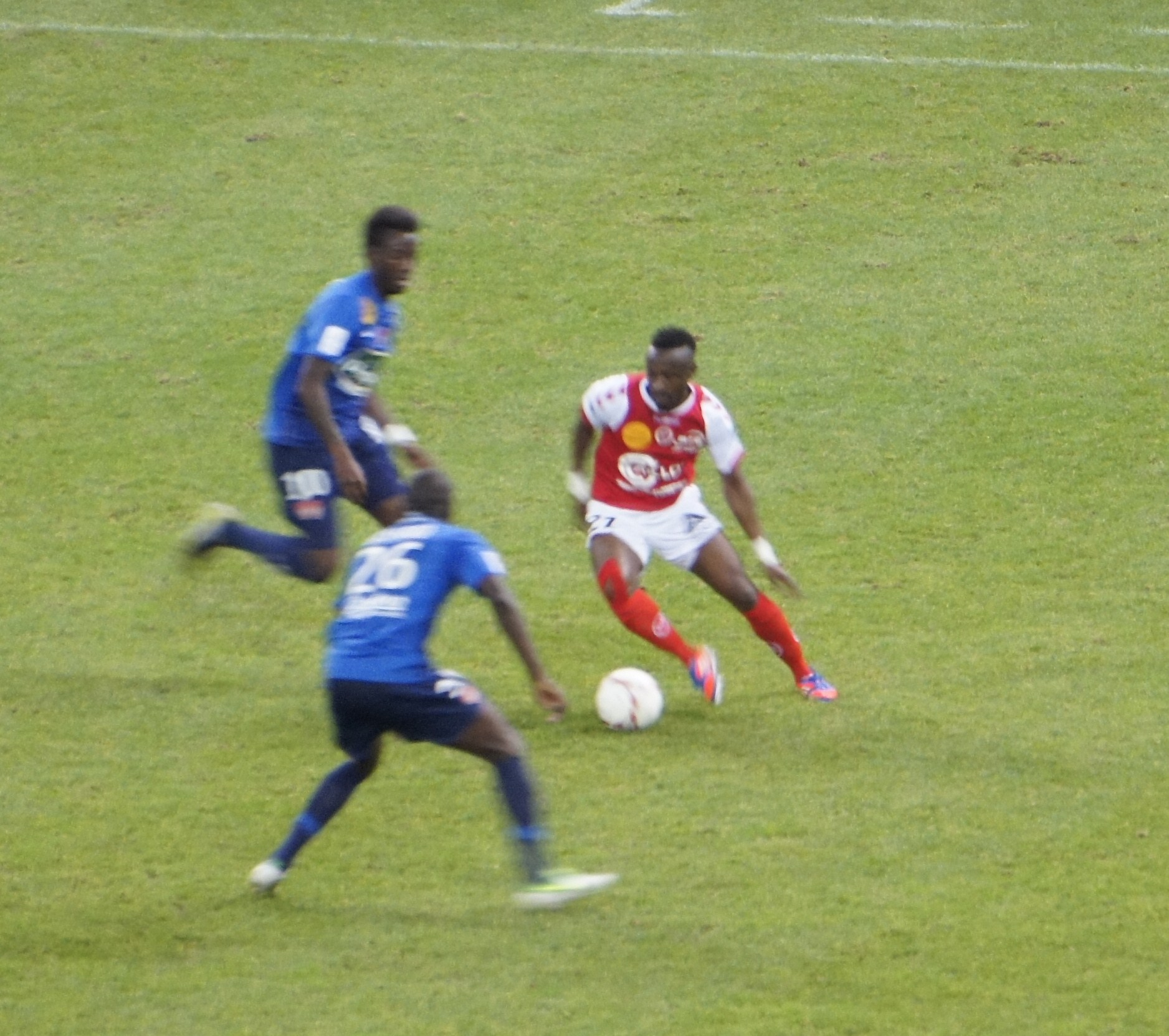

Personal information
- Full name: Josué Kossingou Balamandji
- Date of birth: 9 August 1989 (age 37)
- Place of birth: Bangui, Central African Republic
- Height: 1.70 m (5 ft 7 in)
- Position: Striker

Team information
- Current team: Mulhouse

Youth career
- 2000–2004: Red Star
- 2004–2007: Lens
- 2007–2009: Lorient

Senior career*
Years	Team	Apps	(Gls)
2009–2010	Plabennec	1	(1)
2010–2011	Villemomble	21	(15)
2011–2012	Reims	1	(0)
2012–2013	Paris FC	12	(5)
2013	Chernomorets Burgas	6	(3)
2015–	Olympique de Rosny	91	(54)

International career^{‡}
2012–	Central African Republic	9	(1)
- * Club domestic league appearances and goals as of 15 December 2013 ‡ National team caps and goals as of 21:49, 23 December 2014 (UTC)

Josué Kossingou Balamandji (born 9 August 1989) is a Central African footballer who currently plays for Mulhouse. He plays as either a striker or a winger.

== Career ==
=== Club career ===
Balamandji was born in Bangui and moved to France at two months old. After rotating between both countries in his youth, at the age of eight, his family moved permanently to France settling in Paris. Balamandji began his career with Red Star before joining professional club Lens at the age of 15. Following the 2006–07 season, he was released from the club and, subsequently, signed with Lorient. With Lorient, Balamandji played on the club's reserve team. After two years with Lorient, he signed with Plabennec in the Championnat National. Balamandji only made one appearance with the team in the 2009–10 season.

Before the 2010–11 season, Balamandji joined amateur club Villemomble in the Championnat de France amateur, the fourth level of French football. The forward had a successful campaign appearing in 20 matches and scoring 11 goals, which included a double against his former club Red Star. On 24 May 2011, it was announced that Balamandji had signed his first professional contract agreeing to a two-year deal with Reims. He made his professional debut on 30 July 2011 appearing as a substitute in a 2–0 win over his former club Lens.

== Career statistics ==
=== Club ===
(Correct as of 28 November 2011)

Club	Season	League		Cup (Note: Includes Coupe de France and Coupe de la Ligue matches.)		Europe		Other (Note: Includes Trophée des champions, UEFA Supercup, and FIFA Club World Cup matches.)		Total	
Club	Season	Apps	Goals	Apps	Goals	Apps	Goals	Apps	Goals	Apps	Goals
Plabennec	2009–10	1	0	0	0	—		—		1	0
Villemomble	2010–11	20	11	0	0	—		—		20	11
Reims	2011–12	1	0	0	0	—		—		1	0
Career total		22	11	0	0	0	0	0	0	22	11

=== International goal ===
Scores and results list Central African Republic's goal tally first.

No	Date	Venue	Opponent	Score	Result	Competition
1.	31 May 2014	Estádio 24 de Setembro, Bissau, Guinea-Bissau	Guinea-Bissau	1–3	1–3	2015 Africa Cup of Nations qualifier
