= Plamen Iliev (footballer, born 1994) =

Bulgarian footballer

Personal information
- Full name: Plamen Tonev Iliev
- Date of birth: 4 February 1994 (age 32)
- Place of birth: Pleven, Bulgaria
- Position: Winger

Team information
- Current team: Spartak Pleven

Youth career
- –2008: Litex Lovech
- 2008–2013: Levski Sofia

Senior career*
Years	Team	Apps	(Gls)
2013–2014	Levski Sofia	1	(0)
2013	→ Botev Vratsa (loan)	7	(0)
2014	→ Spartak Pleven (loan)	?	(?)
2014	Lokomotiv GO	1	(0)
2015–	Spartak Pleven	1	(1)
- * Club domestic league appearances and goals as of 23 March 2015

Plamen Tonev Iliev (Bulgarian: Пламен Тонев Илиев; born 4 February 1994 in Pleven) is a Bulgarian footballer currently playing as a winger for Spartak Pleven.

== Career ==
Born in Pleven, Iliev began his career at his hometown club, Spartak Pleven.

In 2008, he joined Levski Sofia's Academy.

== Career statistics ==
As of 15 April 2013.

Club	Season	League		Cup		Continental		Total	
Club	Season	Apps	Goals	Apps	Goals	Apps	Goals	Apps	Goals
Levski Sofia	2012–13	1	0	0	0	0	0	1	0
Total		1	0	0	0	0	0	1	0
