= Nikolay Bankov =

Bulgarian footballer

Personal information
- Full name: Nikolay Ivelinov Bankov
- Date of birth: 19 November 1990 (age 35)
- Place of birth: Dobrich, Bulgaria
- Height: 1.89 m (6 ft 2 in)
- Position: Goalkeeper

Youth career
- Dobrudzha Dobrich

Senior career*
Years	Team	Apps	(Gls)
2008–2010	Spartak Varna	14	(0)
2010–2013	Minyor Pernik	8	(0)
2013	Spartak Varna	11	(0)
2014–2015	Haskovo	25	(0)
2015	Pirin Blagoevgrad	0	(0)
2016	Dobrudzha Dobrich	12	(0)
2016–2017	Lokomotiv GO	26	(0)
2017–2018	Ruch Chorzów	18	(0)
2018	Botev Vratsa	0	(0)
2019	Chalkida		
2019–2020	Arda Kardzhali	3	(0)
2020–2022	Septemvri Sofia	43	(0)
- * Club domestic league appearances and goals

Nikolay Ivelinov Bankov (Bulgarian: Николай Банков; born 19 November 1990) is a Bulgarian former professional footballer who played as a goalkeeper.

== Career ==
Bankov started his career in his home town Dobrich in the local team Dobrudzha Dobrich. He made an impression during the 2016–17 season while playing for Lokomotiv Gorna Oryahovitsa. He left the club in June 2017 when his contract expired following the team's relegation to Second League.

On 18 July 2017, Bankov signed a two-year contract with Polish I liga side Ruch Chorzów. He was part of the Arda Kardzhali team between June 2019 and June 2020.
