= Georgi Radev =

Bulgarian footballer

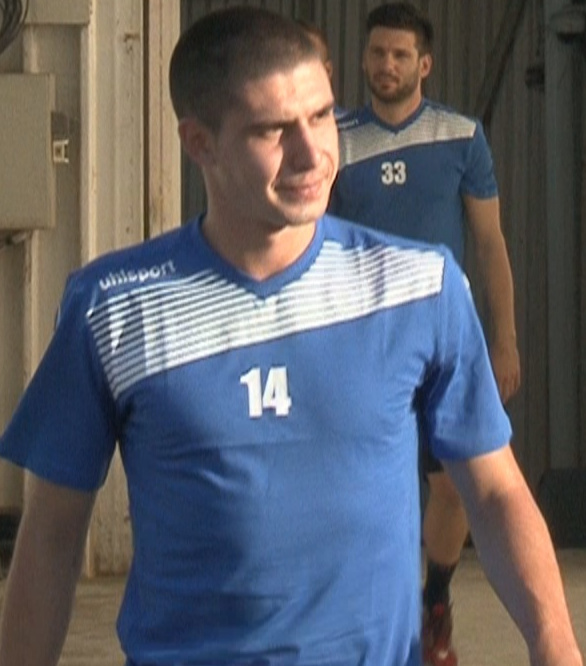

Personal information
- Full name: Georgi Plamenov Radev
- Date of birth: 15 September 1994 (age 32)
- Place of birth: Dobrich, Bulgaria
- Height: 1.87 m (6 ft 2 in)
- Position: Centre-back

Team information
- Current team: Aksakovo

Youth career
- 2002–2009: Dobrudzha Dobrich
- 2009–2013: Cherno More

Senior career*
Years	Team	Apps	(Gls)
2012–2013	Cherno More	0	(0)
2013	Dobrudzha	2	(0)
2014	Lyubimets 2007	13	(0)
2014–2016	Sozopol	32	(1)
2016	Cherno More	0	(0)
2016	Sozopol	6	(0)
2017–2018	Tsarsko Selo	28	(0)
2018	Dobrudzha	13	(0)
2019	Neftochimic	14	(0)
2019	Spartak Varna	6	(0)
2020	Dordoi Bishkek	?	(?)
2020–2022	Sozopol	60	(0)
2022–2023	Litex	32	(1)
2023–2024	Chernomorets Balchik	30	(0)
2024–	Aksakovo	16	(0)

International career
2012	Bulgaria U19	2	(0)
2016	Bulgaria U21	4	(0)
- * Club domestic league appearances and goals as of 11:50, 13 March 2025 (UTC)

Georgi Radev (Bulgarian: Георги Радев; born 15 September 1994) is a Bulgarian footballer who plays as a centre-back for Litex.

== Career ==
On 3 June 2016, Radev rejoined his youth team Cherno More from Sozopol for undisclosed fee, but on 20 July was released and subsequently returned to Sozopol. On 13 December 2016, Radev was released by Sozopol. A few days later, he joined Tsarsko Selo Sofia.

In June 2018, Radev returned to his hometown club Dobrudzha Dobrich.

On 20 January 2020, Dordoi Bishkek announced the signing of Radev on a one-year contract.

In June 2022, he joined Litex Lovech.
