= Mladen Stoev =

Bulgarian footballer (born 1984)

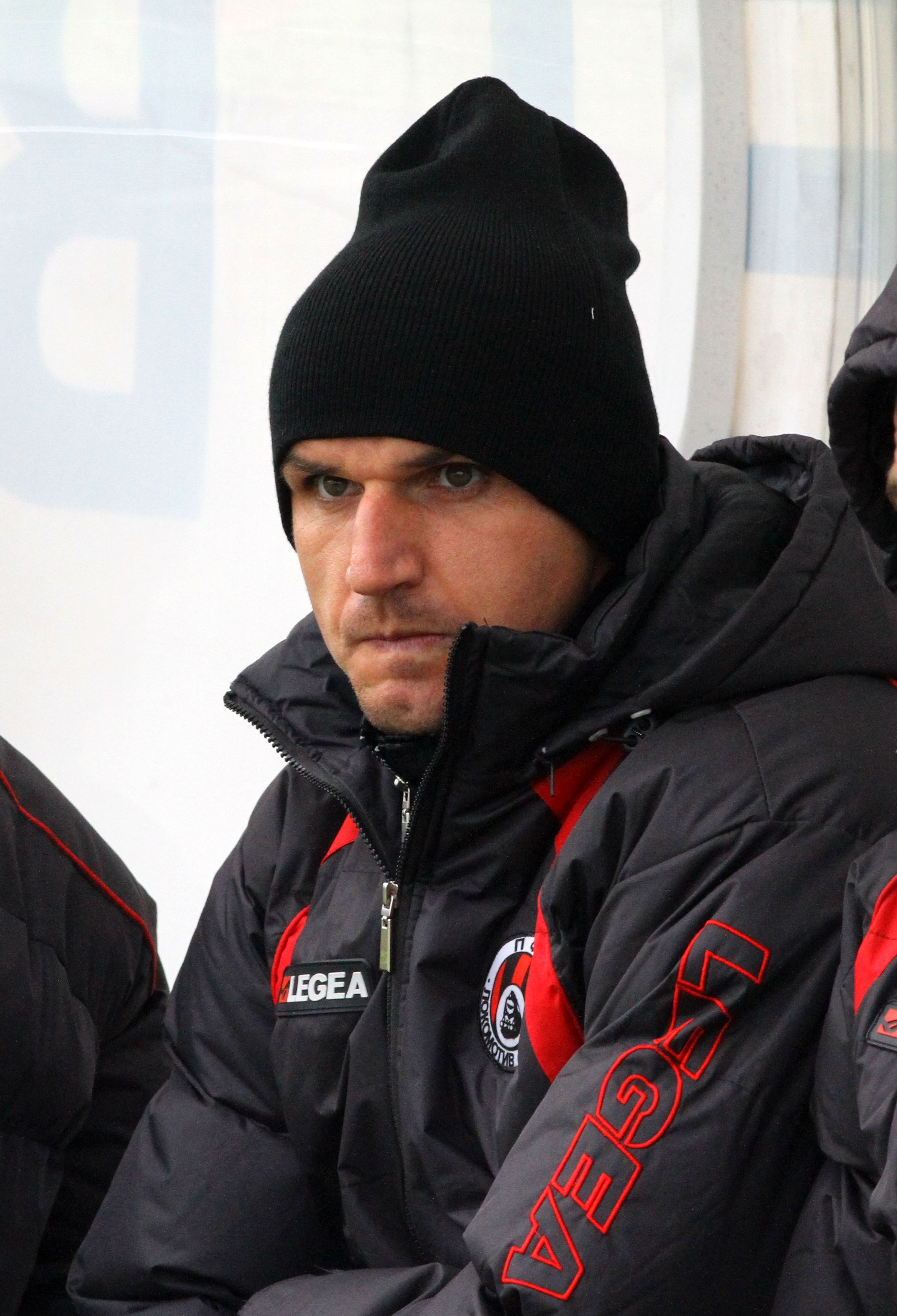

Personal information
- Full name: Mladen Lyudmilov Stoev
- Date of birth: 26 January 1984 (age 42)
- Place of birth: Sofia, Bulgaria
- Height: 1.86 m (6 ft 1 in)
- Position: Attacking midfielder

Team information
- Current team: Septemvri Sofia (assistant manager)

Youth career
- –2002: Lokomotiv Sofia

Senior career*
Years	Team	Apps	(Gls)
2002–2005	Lokomotiv Sofia	34	(2)
2005–2006	Spartak Varna	14	(2)
2006	Dunav Ruse	11	(3)
2007	Spartak Varna	21	(2)
2008	Lokomotiv Mezdra	11	(1)
2008	Rodopa Smolyan	12	(5)
2009	Vihren Sandanski	15	(6)
2010	Minyor Pernik	19	(3)
2011	Sportist Svoge	27	(10)
2012	Lokomotiv Sofia	13	(1)
2013	Dobrudzha Dobrich		
2013	Dunav Ruse	10	(2)
2014	Lyubimets 2007	3	(0)
2014	Minyor Pernik		
2015	Lokomotiv Sofia		
2015	Botev Ihtiman		

Managerial career
- 2025: Septemvri Sofia (assistant)
- 2025: Septemvri Sofia
- 2025–: Septemvri Sofia (assistant)
- * Club domestic league appearances and goals

Mladen Stoev (Bulgarian: Младен Стоев; born 26 January 1984) is a Bulgarian football coach and former footballer.
