= Svetoslav Petrov (footballer, born 1988) =

Bulgarian footballer

Personal information
- Full name: Svetoslav Parvanov Petrov
- Date of birth: 20 August 1988 (age 38)
- Place of birth: Sandanski, Bulgaria
- Height: 1.78 m (5 ft 10 in)
- Position: Midfielder

Team information
- Current team: Lyubimets 2007
- Number: 22

Senior career*
Years	Team	Apps	(Gls)
2007–2009	Vihren Sandanski	35	(0)
2010	Sportist Svoge	5	(0)
2010–2011	Brestnik 1948	18	(0)
2011	Sliven 2000	9	(1)
2012–2013	Lokomotiv Sofia	23	(0)
2013–	Lyubimets 2007	1	(0)
- * Club domestic league appearances and goals as of 1 September 2013

Svetoslav Petrov (Bulgarian: Светослав Петров; born 20 August 1988) is a Bulgarian footballer currently playing for Lyubimets 2007 as a midfielder.

Petrov played for Vihren Sandanski before joining Sportist Svoge in January 2010.
