= Ruslan Kuang =

Bulgarian footballer

Personal information
- Full name: Ruslan Tien Kuang
- Date of birth: 25 October 1985 (age 41)
- Place of birth: Vidin, Bulgaria
- Height: 1.72 m (5 ft 7 1/2 in)
- Position: Right back

Team information
- Current team: Bdin Vidin

Senior career*
Years	Team	Apps	(Gls)
2004–2010	Bdin Vidin	94	(3)
2010–2013	Botev Vratsa	63	(0)
2013	Lokomotiv Plovdiv	2	(0)
2014–2016	Botev Vratsa	37	(0)
2016–2017	Bdin Vidin		
2017–2021	Partizani Markesh		
2021–	Bdin Vidin	12	(2)
- * Club domestic league appearances and goals as of 8 August 2016

Ruslan Tien Kuang (Bulgarian: Руслан Тиен Куанг; born 25 October 1985) is a Bulgarian professional footballer currently playing for Bdin Vidin. He plays as a defender.

== Career ==
In February 2013, it was revealed that Kuang may be called up to represent the Vietnam national side, the country of his father, but this eventually did not materialize.
