= Andrey Atanasov =

Bulgarian footballer

Personal information
- Full name: Andrey Ognyanov Atanasov
- Date of birth: 9 April 1987 (age 39)
- Place of birth: Gabrovo, Bulgaria
- Height: 1.86 m (6 ft 1 in)
- Position: Forward

Senior career*
Years	Team	Apps	(Gls)
2007–2008	Yantra Gabrovo	14	(2)
2008	Etar 1924		
2008–2010	Volov Shumen	38	(15)
2010–2011	Chernomorets Pomorie	31	(9)
2012	Lokomotiv Sofia	5	(0)
2012	Banants Yerevan	4	(0)
2012–2013	Botev Vratsa	21	(6)
2013	Lokomotiv Plovdiv	2	(0)
2014	Calisia Kalisz	12	(0)
2014	Rudar Pljevlja	3	(0)
2015	Acharnaikos	6	(0)
2015	Aiginiakos		
2016	Levski Karlovo	5	(0)
2017–2018	Borislav Parvomay	31	(24)
2019	Dimitrovgrad	6	(4)
2020	Atletik Kuklen		
2020–2021	Borislav Parvomay		
2021	Levski Karlovo	3	(2)
2022	Bdin Vidin	13	(5)
2022	Borislav Parvomay	16	(3)
2023	Svilengrad 2022		
- * Club domestic league appearances and goals

Andrey Atanasov (Bulgarian: Андрей Атанасов; born 9 April 1987) is a Bulgarian former professional footballer who played as a forward.

He previously played for Yantra Gabrovo, Volov Shumen, Chernomorets Pomorie, Lokomotiv Sofia, Banants Yerevan, Botev Vratsa, Lokomotiv Plovdiv and Calisia Kalisz.
