= Angel Yoshev =

Bulgarian footballer

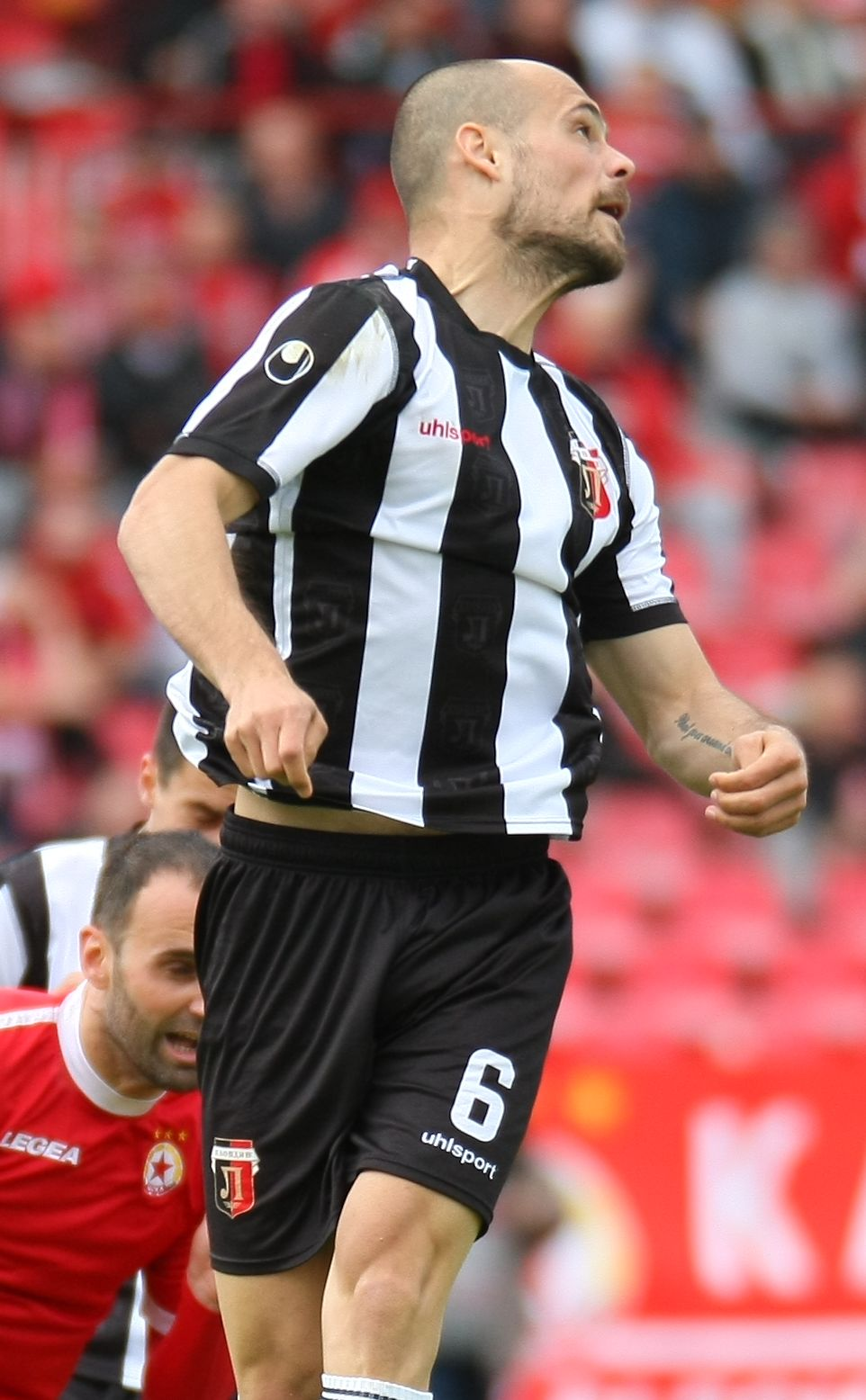

Personal information
- Full name: Angel Bozhidarov Yoshev
- Date of birth: 1 January 1985 (age 41)
- Place of birth: Sofia, Bulgaria
- Height: 1.82 m (6 ft 0 in)
- Position: Left-back

Team information
- Current team: Marek Dupnitsa
- Number: 2

Senior career*
Years	Team	Apps	(Gls)
2003–2004	CSKA Sofia	4	(0)
2004–2006	Conegliano German	43	(1)
2006–2010	Lokomotiv Plovdiv	106	(0)
2011	Minyor Pernik	1	(0)
2011–2012	Lokomotiv Plovdiv	9	(0)
2012	Hamrun Spartans	12	(1)
2013	Svetkavitsa	7	(0)
2013	Neftochimic 1986	10	(0)
2014	Lokomotiv Plovdiv	7	(0)
2014–	Marek Dupnitsa	5	(0)
- * Club domestic league appearances and goals as of 27 May 2015

Angel Bozhidarov Yoshev (Bulgarian: Ангел Божидаров Йошев; born 1 January 1985) is a Bulgarian footballer, currently playing as a defender for Marek Dupnitsa. Yoshev is a left back.
