= Rumen Lapantov =

Bulgarian footballer

Personal information
- Full name: Rumen Borisov Lapantov
- Date of birth: 11 April 1984 (age 42)
- Place of birth: Bulgaria
- Height: 1.76 m (5 ft 9 1/2 in)
- Position: Midfielder

Senior career*
Years	Team	Apps	(Gls)
2004–2007	Vihren Sandanski	19	(1)
2007–2008	Pirin Blagoevgrad		
2008–2010	Pirin Gotse Delchev	50	(6)
2010–2011	Etar 1924	27	(1)
2011–2013	Pirin Gotse Delchev	67	(4)
2014–2015	Pirin Gotse Delchev		
- * Club domestic league appearances and goals

Rumen Lapantov (Bulgarian: Румен Лапантов; born 11 April 1984) is a Bulgarian football player, currently playing as a midfielder.

On 12 August 2012, Lapantov scored Pirin's first-ever A PFG goal, in a two to one home win against Minyor Pernik.
