= Marquinho (footballer, born 1989) =

Portuguese footballer

Personal information
- Full name: Marco Gomes Rodrigues
- Date of birth: 22 June 1989 (age 37)
- Place of birth: Ribeira Brava, Portugal
- Height: 1.71 m (5 ft 7 in)
- Position: Midfielder

Team information
- Current team: Ribeira Brava

Youth career
- 1998–2005: Ribeira Brava
- 2005–2008: Marítimo

Senior career*
Years	Team	Apps	(Gls)
2008–2011	Marítimo B	72	(2)
2011–2013	Ribeira Brava	53	(8)
2013	Chernomorets	17	(3)
2014–2018	Camacha	81	(15)
2018	União Madeira	10	(1)
2019–	Ribeira Brava	30	(13)
- * Club domestic league appearances and goals as of 18:53, 23 August 2020 (UTC)

Marco Gomes Rodrigues (born 22 June 1989 in Ribeira Brava, Madeira), commonly known as Marquinho, is a Portuguese professional footballer who plays for CD Ribeira Brava as a midfielder.
