= Bogomil Hristov =

Bulgarian footballer

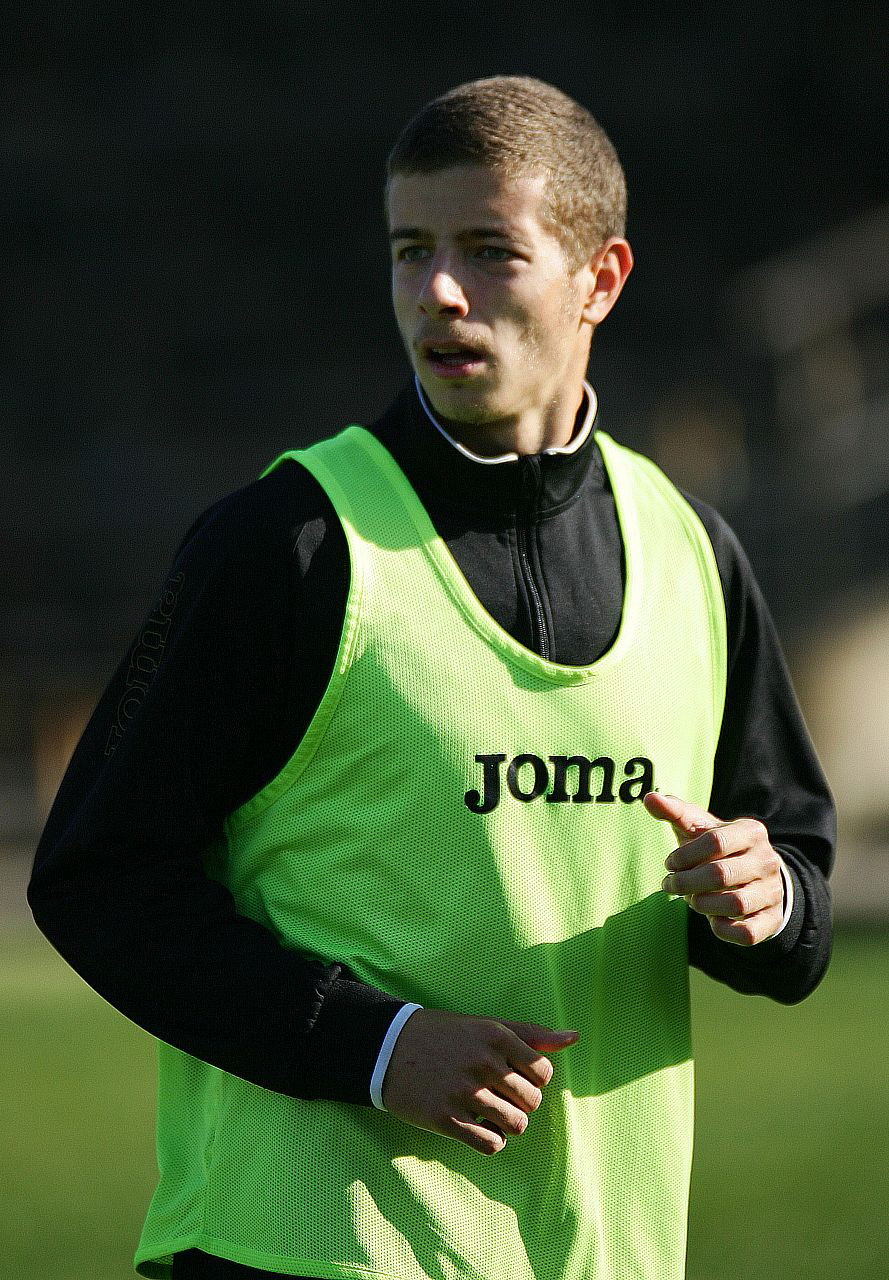

Personal information
- Full name: Bogomil Eftimov Hristov
- Date of birth: 6 January 1994 (age 32)
- Place of birth: Sofia, Bulgaria
- Height: 1.84 m (6 ft 1/2 in)
- Position: Midfielder

Team information
- Current team: Botev Ihtiman
- Number: 10

Youth career
- Septemvri Sofia
- Slavia Sofia
- CSKA Sofia

Senior career*
Years	Team	Apps	(Gls)
2013	CSKA Sofia	5	(0)
2013	Slavia Sofia	7	(0)
2014	Slivnishki Geroy	13	(3)
2014–2015	Bansko	24	(0)
2015	Spartak Pleven	7	(0)
2016–2017	Lokomotiv Sofia	27	(0)
2017–2018	Botev Galabovo	1	(0)
2018	Lokomotiv Sofia	8	(0)
2019	Oborishte	13	(0)
2019–2020	Strumska Slava	8	(0)
2020–	Botev Ihtiman	0	(0)
- * Club domestic league appearances and goals as of 1 August 2020

Bogomil Eftimov Hristov (Bulgarian: Богомил Ефтимов Христов; born 6 January 1994) is a Bulgarian footballer who currently plays for Botev Ihtiman as a midfielder.

== Career ==
Hristov played for Slivnishki Geroy and Lokomotiv Sofia.

In July 2017, he joined Botev Vratsa but actually signed with Botev Galabovo.
