= Oliveira (footballer, born 1985) =

Brazilian footballer

Personal information
- Full name: Bruno Giglio de Oliveira
- Date of birth: 20 August 1985 (age 41)
- Place of birth: São Vicente, Brazil
- Height: 1.88 m (6 ft 2 in)
- Position: Centre back

Team information
- Current team: Inter de Limeira

Senior career*
Years	Team	Apps	(Gls)
2005	Grêmio Catanduvense		
2005	Mogi Mirim		
2006–2007	Lemense		
2008	Itapirense		
2009	Botafogo-SP		
2009	Francana		
2010–2011	Red Bull Brasil	7	(0)
2012	Noroeste	12	(0)
2012–2013	Feirense	31	(3)
2013	Chernomorets Burgas	7	(0)
2014	Lajeadense	13	(0)
2014	Treze	11	(1)
2015	Ypiranga	0	(0)
2015–2016	Tarxien Rainbows	27	(2)
2016–2018	Balzan	39	(1)
2019–	Inter de Limeira	1	(0)
- * Club domestic league appearances and goals as of 12:11, 25 April 2019 (UTC)

Bruno Giglio de Oliveira (born 20 August 1985 in São Vicente), commonly known as Oliveira, is a Brazilian central defender who plays for Inter de Limeira.

== Career ==
On 1 July 2013, Oliveira signed a contract with Bulgarian side Chernomorets Burgas as a free agent.
