= 2009–10 Bulgarian Cup =

Tournament details
- Country: Bulgaria

Final positions
- Champions: Beroe Stara Zagora (1st cup)
- Runners-up: Chernomorets Pomorie

The 2009–10 Bulgarian Cup was the 28th official season of the Bulgarian annual football knockout tournament. The competition began on September 16, 2009, with the matches of the preliminary round and ended with the final on May 5, 2010. Litex Lovech are the defending champions.

Beroe won the competition, beating Chernomorets Pomorie in the finals at Gradski. As such, they qualified for the third qualifying round of the 2010–11 UEFA Europa League.

== Participating clubs ==
The following teams competed in the cup: (Teams in bold are still active in the competition)

**2008–09 A Group** all clubs	**2008–09 B Group West** all clubs	**2008–09 B Group East** all clubs	**Winners of regional cup competitions** best eight teams
Levski Sofia; CSKA Sofia; Cherno More Varna; Litex Lovech; Lokomotiv Sofia; Lokomotiv Plovdiv; Chernomorets Burgas; Lokomotiv Mezdra; Slavia Sofia; Pirin Blagoevgrad; Minyor Pernik; Sliven; Botev Plovdiv; Vihren; Spartak Varna; Belasitsa Petrich^{1}	Montana; Sportist; Bansko; Chavdar Etropole; Balkan Botevgrad; Rilski Sportist; Vidima-Rakovski Sevlievo; Pirin Gotse Delchev; Botev Krivodol; Kom-Minyor; Belite orli Etar 1924; Marek Dupnitsa; Chavdar Byala Slatina^{2} Spartak Pleven^{3}	**Beroe Stara Zagora**; **Chernomorets Pomorie**; Kaliakra; Spartak Plovdiv; Dunav Ruse; Lyubimetz 2007; Svetkavitsa; Svilengrad 1921; Minyor Radnevo; Lokomotiv Stara Zagora^{4} Rodopa Smolyan^{5} PFC Chernomorets Balchik; Volov Shumen; Nesebar	OFC Devnya from North-East Zone; FC Tryavna from North-West Zone; Lokomotiv 1925 Septemvri from South-West Zone; Maritsa Plovdiv from South-East Zone; Dobrudzha as Winner in North-East V AFG; Brestnik 1948 as Winner in South-East V AFG; Botev Vratsa as Winner in North-West V AFG; Septemvri Simitli as Winner in South-West V AFG

^{1} Belasitsa Petrich was removed from West B PFG due lack of funding.
^{2} Chavdar Byala Slatina declined its participation on the tournament.
^{3} Spartak Pleven was removed from West B PFG on 10 March 2009 due lack of eligible players.
^{4} Lokomotiv Stara Zagora was removed from East B PFG on 3 August 2009 due lack of funding.
^{5} Rodopa Smolyan declined its participation on the tournament due lack of funding.

== Preliminary round ==
In this round entered 4 winners from the regional competitions as well as 3 teams from B PFG (second level) decided by random draw. There should have been 4 teams selected from B PFG, but since this year's league features only 31 team, 3 teams were chosen. The matches were played on 16 September and 8 October 2009.

16 September 2009	OFC Devnya (III)	1–5	Nesebar (II)	Devnya
16:00 UTC+3	Nikolay Kateliev		Vasil Stefanov; Martin Kokaldzhiev, Ventsislav Hristov (pen.); Ivan Ilyanov	Attendance: Unknown

16 September 2009	Maritsa (III)	3–2 (a.e.t.)	Balkan (II)	Plovdiv
16:00 UTC+3	Yuseinov 47', 95'; Krachunov 119'		Ralchovski 85'; P.Petrov 105'	Stadium: Maritsa; Attendance: Unknown

8 October 2009	Lokomotiv 1925 Septemvri (III)	1–3	Botev Vratsa (II)	Septemvri
15:00 UTC+3	A. Petrov 36' (pen.)		D. Petrov 14', 45'; Romanov 60'	Attendance: 300

Note: Roman numerals in brackets denote the league tier the clubs participate in during the 2009–10 season.

== First round ==
In this round entered winners from the previous round together with the remaining 28 teams from B PFG. The matches were played on 21 October 2009.

20 October 2009	Lyubimetz 2007 (II)	0–5	Brestnik 1948 (II)	Lyubimets
15:00 UTC+3			Atanasov 18', 41', 69'; Gemedzhiev 65'; Stoychev 75'	Stadium: Unknown; Attendance: Unknown

21 October 2009	Minyor Radnevo (II)	2–1	Kom-Minyor (II)	Radnevo
15:00 UTC+3	Pavlov 29'; Kurtev 60'		Kolev 70'	Stadium: Unknown; Attendance: Unknown

21 October 2009	Volov (II)	0–2	Chernomorets Balchik (II)	Shumen
15:00 UTC+3	Cvetkov (red card) 85'		Filipov 72'; Tanev 89'	Stadium: Panayot Volov; Attendance: Unknown

21 October 2009	FC Tryavna (III)	0–1 (a.e.t.)	Vihren (II)	Tryavna
15:00 UTC+3			Abushev 93'; S. Georgiev (red card) 75'	Stadium: Unknown; Attendance: Unknown

21 October 2009	Botev Vratsa (II)	2–0	Spartak Varna (II)	Vratsa
15:00 UTC+3	Valeriev 25', 85'; Borisov (penalty missed)			Stadium: Hristo Botev; Attendance: Unknown

21 October 2009	Chernomorets Pomorie (II)	1–0 (a.e.t.)	Botev Krivodol (II)	Pomorie
15:00 UTC+3	Bozhinov 120' (pen.)			Stadium: Unknown; Attendance: Unknown

21 October 2009	Svilengrad 1921 (II)	1–0	Akademik Sofia (II)	Svilengrad
15:00 UTC+3	Hristov 44'			Stadium: Kolodruma; Attendance: Unknown

21 October 2009	Maritsa (III)	4–1	Vidima-Rakovski (II)	Plovdiv
15:00 UTC+3	Yuseinov 3', 5'; Plachkov 48'; Enchev 80'		Pavlov 32'	Stadium: Maritsa; Attendance: Unknown

21 October 2009	Dunav (II)	2–1 (a.e.t.)	Spartak Plovdiv (II)	Ruse
15:00 UTC+3	Dimov 25'; Dzharnaliev 120'		Chernev 72'	Stadium: Dunav; Attendance: Unknown

21 October 2009	Belite Orli (II)	2–1 (a.e.t.)	Dobrudzha (II)	Pleven
15:00 UTC+3	Petrov 74'; Georgiev 102' (o.g.)		Angelov 24'	Stadium: Belite orli Attendance: Unknown

21 October 2009	Septemvri (II)	2–0	Svetkavitsa (II)	Simitli
15:00 UTC+3	Lyaskov 39'; Kosturkov 43'			Stadium: Unknown; Attendance: Unknown

21 October 2009	Marek (II)	4–0	Nesebar (II)	Dupnitsa
15:00 UTC+3	Sokolov 40'; Vladimirov 55'; Valentinov 76', 90'			Stadium: Bonchuk; Attendance: Unknown

21 October 2009	Bdin (II)	0–1	Rilski sportist (II)	Vidin
15:00 UTC+3			Marinov 26'	Stadium: Unknown; Attendance: Unknown

21 October 2009	Pirin Gotse Delchev (II)	2–0	Etar 1924 (II)	Gotse Delchev
15:00 UTC+3	Lapantov 72'; Yusev 90+2'			Stadium: Unknown; Attendance: Unknown

21 October 2009	Chavdar Etropole (II)	1–0	Bansko (II)	Etropole
15:00 UTC+3	Valov 47'; Paziyski (red card) 80'			Stadium: Unknown; Attendance: Unknown

== Second round ==
This round featured winners from the first round and all 16 teams from A PFG. The matches were played on 24, 25, November, 2, 3, 9 and 10 December 2009.

24 November 2009	Sliven	1–0	Pirin Blagoevgrad	Sliven
13:30 UTC+2	Vandev 2'			Stadium: Hadzhi Dimitar; Attendance: 1,700

25 November 2009	Botev Vratsa (II)	2–0	Chernomorets Balchik (II)	Vratsa
13:30 UTC+2	Rangelov 16'; Romanov 24'			Stadium: Hristo Botev; Attendance: 2,500

25 November 2009	Vihren (II)	0–0 (a.e.t.) (3–4 p)	Slavia	Sandanski
13:30 UTC+2				Stadium: Sandanski; Attendance: 1,300
	Penalties
	Djorov (penalty missed); V. Georgiev (penalty scored); Trenkov (penalty scored); Petrov (penalty scored); Kabranov (penalty missed)		(penalty scored) Mladenov; (penalty scored) B. Georgiev; (penalty scored) Junior; (penalty scored) Popara

25 November 2009	Chernomorets Pomorie (II)	3–0	Dunav (II)	Burgas
13:30 UTC+2	Kostadinov 10', 42'; Bozhinov 73'			Stadium: Pomorie; Attendance: Unknown

25 November 2009	Marek (II)	2–0	Belite orli (II)	Dupnitsa
13:30 UTC+2	Valentinov 18', 57' (pen.)			Stadium: Bonchuk; Attendance: Unknown

25 November 2009	Svilengrad 1921 (II)	0–1	CSKA Sofia	Svilengrad
13:30 UTC+2			Michel Platini 76'	Stadium: Kolodruma; Attendance: 3,000

25 November 2009	Rilski sportist (II)	0–2	Chavdar Etropole (II)	Samokov
13:30 UTC+2			Nikolov 31', 80'	Stadium: Iskar; Attendance: Unknown

25 November 2009	Lokomotiv Sofia	2–1	Botev Plovdiv	Sofia
13:30 UTC+2	Garov 44'; Kamburov 62'		Yordanov 5'	Stadium: Lokomotiv; Attendance: 500

25 November 2009	Kaliakra (II)	2–0	Lokomotiv Plovdiv	Kavarna
13:30 UTC+2	Petkov 5'; Raychev 48' (pen.)			Stadium: Kavarna; Attendance: 2,200

25 November 2009	Maritsa (III)	3–1	Minyor Radnevo (II)	Plovdiv
13:30 UTC+2	Uchikov 22'; Tanev 55'; Bayrev 85'		Kyosev 72'	Stadium: Maritsa; Attendance: Unknown

25 November 2009	Lokomotiv Mezdra	3–0	Sportist	Mezdra
13:30 UTC+2	Bamba 2'; Popov 20'; Todorov 89'			Stadium: Lokomotiv; Attendance: 300

25 November 2009	Chernomorets Burgas	0–2	Cherno More	Burgas
16:30 UTC+2		Report	Bornosuzov 45+1'; Eli Marques 90+2'	Stadium: Lazur; Attendance: 350; Referee: Georgi Yordanov

2 December 2009	Septemvri (II)	0–0 (a.e.t.) (4–5 p)	Minyor Pernik	Simitli
13:30 UTC+2		Report		Stadium: Unknown; Attendance: 400; Referee: Angel Bayltsaliev
	Penalties
	Lyaskov (penalty scored); Luleyski (penalty scored); Shumantov (penalty scored); Petrunov (penalty missed); Dimitrov (penalty scored)		(penalty scored) Vitanov; (penalty scored) Janković; (penalty scored) Krumov; (penalty scored) Zlatkov; (penalty scored) Ashimov

3 December 2009	Pirin Gotse Delchev (II)	0–4	Litex	Gotse Delchev
13:30 UTC+2		Report	Sandrinho 14'; Saidhodzha 37'; Cvetanov 69'; Milanov 90'	Stadium: Gotse Delchev; Attendance: 4,000; Referee: Kalin Lyudmilov

9 December 2009	Brestnik 1948 (II)	0–2	Levski Sofia	Plovdiv
13:00 UTC+2		Report	Hristov 24'; Miliev 69'	Stadium: Lauta; Attendance: Unknown; Referee: Tasko Taskov

10 December 2009	Montana	0–1	Beroe	Montana
13:30 UTC+3		Report	Atanasov 65'	Stadium: Ogosta; Attendance: 1,000; Referee: Stanislav Stavrev

== Third round ==
In this round entered winners from the second round. The matches were played on 12 and 13 December 2009.

12 December 2009	Minyor Pernik	1–0	Sliven	Pernik
13:00 UTC+2	Janković 41'	Report		Stadium: Minyor; Attendance: 1,500; Referee: Ivaylo Stoyanov

12 December 2009	Chernomorets Pomorie (II)	1–0	Botev Vratsa (II)	Pomorie
13:00 UTC+2	R. Vankov 47' (o.g.)	Report		Stadium: Gradski Stadion Pomorie; Attendance: 50; Referee: Dimitar Andreev

12 December 2009	Marek Dupnitsa (II)	1–5	Kaliakra (II)	Dupnitsa
13:30 UTC+2		Report		Stadium: Bonchuk; Attendance: 200; Referee: Georgi Ignatov

12 December 2009	Maritsa Plovdiv (III)	0–1 (a.e.t.)	Chavdar Etropole (II)	Plovdiv
13:00 UTC+2		Report	P. Tonchev 97'	Stadium: Maritsa; Attendance: 800; Referee: Atanas Dimitrov

12 December 2009	Lokomotiv Sofia	1–2	Slavia Sofia	Sofia
13:30 UTC+2	Baldovaliev 14'; Bandalovski (yellow card) 25' (yellow-red card) 44'	Report	Du Bala 41'; Ivanov 59'	Stadium: Lokomotiv; Attendance: 1,200; Referee: Nikolay Yordanov

12 December 2009	CSKA Sofia	1–0	Litex Lovech	Sofia
16:00 UTC+2	Delev 48'	Report		Stadium: Balgarska Armiya; Attendance: 1,500; Referee: Aleksandar Kostadinov

13 December 2009	Lokomotiv Mezdra	0–3	Beroe	Mezdra
13:30 UTC+2			Atanasov 10', 48', 74'	Stadium: Lokomotiv; Attendance: 300; Referee: Angel Angelov

13 December 2009	Cherno More Varna	4–1	Levski Sofia	Varna
13:30 UTC+2	Iliev 29', 50'; Georgiev 45'; Dyakov 88'		Milanov 39'; Rabeh (red card) 15'	Stadium: Ticha; Attendance: 2,500; Referee: Stanislav Stavrov

== Quarter-finals ==
31 March 2010	Chernomorets Pomorie (II)	2–0	Minyor Pernik	Pomorie
16:00 UTC+2	Pehlivanov 56'; Petkov 88'	Report		Stadium: Pomorie Stadium; Attendance: 3,000; Referee: Hristo Ristoskov

31 March 2010	Beroe	1–0	CSKA Sofia	Stara Zagora
16:00 UTC+2	Pisarov 73'	Report		Stadium: Beroe; Attendance: 10,000; Referee: Stefan Spasov

31 March 2010	Chavdar Etropole (II)	0–0 (a.e.t.) (4–2 p)	Slavia Sofia	Etropole
16:00 UTC+2		Report		Stadium: Chavdar; Attendance: 1,500; Referee: Ivaylo Stoyanov
	Penalties
	Nikolov (penalty scored); Ruskov (penalty scored); Petrov (penalty scored); Valchanov (penalty scored)		(penalty scored) Junior; (penalty scored) Peev; (penalty missed) Petrov; (penalty missed) Popara

31 March 2010	Kaliakra (II)	0–0 (a.e.t.) (3–2 p)	Cherno More Varna	Kavarna
19:30 UTC+2		Report		Stadium: Kavarna; Attendance: 4,000; Referee: Nikolay Yordanov
	Penalties
	Raychev (penalty scored); Kyuchukov (penalty scored); Sadula (penalty missed); Petkov (penalty scored)		(penalty scored) Yurukov; (penalty scored) Aleksandrov; (penalty missed) Bachev; (penalty missed) Domakinov; (penalty missed) Bornosuzov

== Semi-finals ==
28 April 2010	Chernomorets Pomorie (II)	1–1 (a.e.t.) (3–0 p)	Kaliakra (II)	Pomorie
13:00 UTC+2	Filipov 33'	Report	D. Stoilov 13'; Raychev (yellow card) 71' (yellow-red card) 88'	Stadium: Pomorie Stadium; Attendance: 3,000; Referee: Georgi Yordanov
	Penalties
	Filipov (penalty scored); Mitev (penalty missed); Bozhinov (penalty scored); G. Kostadinov (penalty scored)		(penalty missed) D. Dimitrov; (penalty missed) Kyuchukov; (penalty missed) Sabev

28 April 2010	Chavdar Etropole (II)	0–1	Beroe	Etropole
15:30 UTC+2		Report	A. Atanasov 39'	Stadium: Chavdar Stadium; Attendance: 5,000; Referee: Stanislav Todorov

== Final ==
5 May 2010
18:00

Chernomorets Pomorie	0–1	Beroe Stara Zagora
		D. Atanasov 90+2'

Gradski Stadium, Lovech
Attendance: 5,250
Referee: Nikolay Yordanov (Sofia)
