= 2011–12 Bulgarian Cup =

Tournament details
- Country: Bulgaria

Final positions
- Champions: Ludogorets Razgrad (1st cup)
- Runners-up: Lokomotiv Plovdiv

The 2011–12 Bulgarian Cup was the 30th official season of the Bulgarian annual football knockout tournament. The competition began in September 2011 with the matches of the preliminary round and ended with the final in May 2012. CSKA Sofia were the defending champions, but lost to Septemvri Simitli in the quarterfinals. Ludogorets Razgrad won the title, after defeating Lokomotiv Plovdiv in the final.

The winners of the competition, Ludogorets, won also the championship and thus the Bulgarian cup runner-up, Lokomotiv Plovdiv, qualified for the second qualifying round of the 2012–13 UEFA Europa League.

== Participating clubs ==
The following teams competed in the cup:

2011–12 A Group all clubs	2011–12 B Group West all clubs	2011–12 B Group East all clubs	Winners of 9 regional competitions †
Litex Lovech; Levski Sofia; CSKA Sofia; Lokomotiv Sofia; Lokomotiv Plovdiv; Cherno More Varna; Beroe Stara Zagora; Chernomorets Burgas; Minyor Pernik; Montana; Slavia Sofia; Kaliakra Kavarna; Vidima-Rakovski Sevlievo; Botev Vratsa; Ludogorets Razgrad; Svetkavitsa Targovishte	Akademik Sofia; Sportist Svoge; Bansko; Chavdar Etropole; Septemvri Simitli; Pirin Gotse Delchev; Chavdar Byala Slatina; Malesh Mikrevo; Bdin Vidin; Slivnishki Geroi	Sliven 2000; Chernomorets Pomorie; Nesebar; Lyubimetz 2007; Dorostol Silistra; Dobrudzha Dobrich; Botev Plovdiv; Spartak Varna; Neftochimic Burgas; Etar 1924	from North-West zone: Spartak Pleven; Lokomotiv Gorna Oryahovitsa; Botev Kozloduy; from South-East zone: Rakovski 2011; Tundzha Yambol; Vereya Stara Zagora; from South-West zone: Chepinets Velingrad; Urvich Dolni Pasarel; Pirin Zemen

†: Teams from the North-East zone declined participation

== Calendar for remaining rounds ==
The calendar for the remaining rounds of the 2010–11 Bulgarian Cup, as announced by the BFL.

- Round 1: 20 October 2011
- Round 2: 23 November 2011
- Round 3: 3 December 2011
- Quarter-finals: Spring 2012
- Semi-finals: Spring 2012
- Final: May 2012

== First round ==
The draw was conducted on 12 October 2011. The matches will be played on 20 October 2011 and one match on 19 October 2011. On this stage the participants will be the 20 teams from the two groups of B PFG (second division) and the 9 winners from the regional amateur competitions. The team from the lower league had home advantage.

Because the teams from North-East zone canceled their participation, three teams will receive a bye for the next round. According to the draw those teams are FC Bansko (Bansko) (II), FC Vereya (Stara Zagora) (IV) and FC Slivnishki Geroi (Slivnitsa) (II).

Note: Roman numerals in brackets denote the league tier the clubs participate in during the 2011–12 season.

19 October 2011	Urvich Dolni Pasarel (IV)	0–5	Chavdar Etropole (II)	Dolni Pasarel
15:00 EEST		Report		Stadium: Gradski

19 October 2011	Pirin Zemen (IV)	0–6	Lyubimets 2007 (II)	Zemen
15:00 EEST		Report		Stadium: Gradski

20 October 2011	Chavdar Byala Slatina (II)	2–3	Dobrudzha Dobrich (II)	Byala Slatina
15:00 EEST		Report		Stadium: Chavdar

20 October 2011	Etar 1924 (II)	2–1	Akademik Sofia (II)	Veliko Tarnovo
15:00 EEST		Report		Stadium: Ivaylo

20 October 2011	Neftochimic Burgas (II)	0–0 (a.e.t.) (8–7 p)	Spartak Varna (II)	Burgas
15:00 EEST		Report		Stadium: Lazur

20 October 2011	Lokomotiv Gorna Oryahovitsa (III)	1–3	Septemvri Simitli (II)	Gorna Oryahovitsa
15:00 EEST		Report		Stadium: Lokomotiv

20 October 2011	Pirin Gotse Delchev (II)	2–0	Dorostol Silistra (II)	Gotse Delchev
15:00 EEST		Report		Stadium: Gradski

20 October 2011	Tundzha Yambol (III)	7–0	Bdin Vidin (II)	Yambol
15:00 EEST		Report		Stadium: Luskov

20 October 2011	Sliven 2000 (II)	0–1	Nesebar (II)	Nesebar
15:00 EEST		Report		Stadium: Gradski

20 October 2011	Spartak Pleven (III)	2–0	Rakovski 2011 (III)	Pleven
15:00 EEST		Report		Stadium: Slavi Aleksiev

20 October 2011	Botev Plovdiv (II)	2–1	Malesh Mikrevo (II)	Plovdiv
15:00 EEST		Report		Stadium: Hristo Botev

20 October 2011	Sportist Svoge (II)	3–0	Chernomorets Pomorie (II)	Svoge
15:00 EEST		Report		Stadium: Chavdar Tsvetkov

20 October 2011	Chepinets Velingrad (III)	0–1	Botev Kozloduy (III)	Velingrad
15:00 EEST		Report		Stadium: Gradski

== Second round ==
The draw was conducted on 3 November 2011. The matches will be played on 23 November 2011. On this stage the participants will be the 16 winners from the first round and the 16 teams from A PFG (first division). The team from the lower league has home advantage.

Note: Roman numerals in brackets denote the league tier the clubs participate in during the 2011–12 season.

23 November 2011	Botev Kozloduy (III)	2–2 (a.e.t.) (7−8 p)	Septemvri Simitli (II)	Kozloduy
13:30 EET	Topuzov 20' (o.g.); Kaptiev 90'	Report	Stoyanov 33', 44'	Stadium: Hristo Botev; Referee: Martin Dimitrov (Stara Zagora)

23 November 2011	Chavdar Etropole (II)	0–2	Lokomotiv Plovdiv	Etropole
13:30 EET		Report	Venkov 3'; Serginho 76'	Stadium: Chavdar; Referee: Stefan Spasov (Pernik)

23 November 2011	Minyor Pernik	1–1 (a.e.t.) (5−3 p)	Cherno More	Pernik
13:30 EET	Vasilev 69'	Report	Markov 3' (o.g.)	Stadium: Minyor; Referee: Hristo Ristoskov (Blagoevgrad)

23 November 2011	Bansko (II)	0–1	Levski Sofia	Bansko
13:30 EET		Report	Tsvetkov 33'	Stadium: St. Peter; Referee: Ahemd Ahmed (Burgas)

23 November 2011	Vidima-Rakovski	1–1 (a.e.t.) (4−5 p)	Svetkavitsa	Sevlievo
13:30 EET	Kakalov 93'	Report	Dimov 114'	Stadium: Rakovski; Referee: Anton Genov (Sofia)

23 November 2011	Slavia Sofia	0–1	CSKA Sofia	Sofia
13:30 EET		Report	Moraes 19'	Stadium: Ovcha Kupel; Referee: Georgi Kabakov (Plovdiv)

23 November 2011	Kaliakra Kavarna	1–1 (a.e.t.) (4−3 p)	Lokomotiv Sofia	Kavarna
13:30 EET	Kichukov 68'	Report	Telkiyski 20'	Stadium: Kavarna; Referee: Stanislav Stavrov (Veliko Tarnovo)

23 November 2011	Pirin Gotse Delchev (II)	1–3	Chernomorets Burgas	Gotse Delchev
13:30 EET	Filipov 5' (o.g.)	Report	Dyakov 11'; Baldzhiyski 41'; Anicet 88'	Stadium: Gradski; Referee: Kalin Lyudmilov (Sofia)

23 November 2011	Botev Plovdiv (II)	1–0	Botev Vratsa	Plovdiv
13:30 EET	Hristov 90+1'	Report		Stadium: Hristo Botev; Referee: Nikola Popov (Sofia)

23 November 2011	Sportist Svoge (II)	0–5	Litex Lovech	Svoge
13:30 EET		Report	Tsvetanov 37', 64'; Itoua 53'; Todorov 65'; Djermanović 88'	Stadium: Chavdar Tsvetkov; Referee: Radan Miryanov (Varna)

23 November 2011	Spartak Pleven (III)	4–1	Lyubimetz 2007 (II)	Pleven
13:30 EET	Kunchev 19', 23'; Shopov 51'; Grigorov 90'	Report	Minchev 60'	Stadium: Slavi Aleksiev; Referee: Vladimir Ovcharov (Smolyan)

23 November 2011	Dobrudzha Dobrich (II)	1–0	Nesebar (II)	Dobrich
13:30 EET	Todorov 90+3' (pen.)	Report		Stadium: Druzhba; Referee: Stanislav Todorov (Shumen)

23 November 2011	Tundzha Yambol (III)	0–0 (a.e.t.) (5−4 p)	Montana	Yambol
13:30 EET		Report		Stadium: Luskov; Referee: Viktor Valkov (Plovdiv)

23 November 2011	Beroe Stara Zagora	0–1 (a.e.t.)	Ludogorets Razgrad	Stara Zagora
18:00 EET		Report	Ivanov 104'	Stadium: Beroe; Referee: Blagoy Marinov (Sofia)

24 November 2011	Etar 1924 (II)	2–0	Neftochimic Burgas (II)	Veliko Tarnovo
13:30 EET	Sechkov 39'; Stankev 66'	Report		Stadium: Ivaylo; Referee: Stoyan Denev (Veliko Tarnovo)

24 November 2011	Vereya Stara Zagora (IV)	1–4	Slivnishki Geroi (II)	Stara Zagora
13:30 EET	Kalchev 83'	Report	Kurtelov 18', 24'; Hadzhiev 22'; Petrov 76'	Stadium: Vereya; Attendance: Atanas Dimitrov (Sliven)

== Third round ==
The draw will be conducted on 25 November 2011. The matches will be played on 3 December 2011. On this stage the participants will be the 16 winners from the second round. The team from the lower league has home advantage.

Note: Roman numerals in brackets denote the league tier the clubs participate in during the 2011–12 season.

3 December 2011	Etar 1924 (II)	0–3	Levski Sofia	Veliko Tarnovo
12:30 EET		Report	Tsvetkov 49', 90+3'; Dimov 78'; Calvo (yellow card) 36'	Stadium: Ivaylo; Attendance: 10,000; Referee: Anton Genov (Sofia)

3 December 2011	Dobrudzha Dobrich (II)	0–4	Lokomotiv Plovdiv	Dobrich
13:00 EET	Florov (yellow card) 61'	Report	Kotsev 1', 65', 90+1'; Rodrigues 78'; Rodrigues (yellow card) 33'	Stadium: Druzhba; Attendance: 2,200; Referee: Ahmed Ahmed (Burgas)

3 December 2011	Tundzha Yambol (III)	0–3	Minyor Pernik	Yambol
13:00 EET	Sashev (yellow card) 38' (yellow-red card) 54'; Gargov (yellow card) 52'	Report	Vasilev 25'; Trajanov 54' (pen.); Tom 87'; Trajanov (yellow card) 36'; Mihov (yellow card) 58'; Tom (yellow card) 62'	Stadium: Luskov; Attendance: 700; Referee: Georgi Ignatov (Sofia)

3 December 2011	Septemvri Simitli (II)	3–0	Slivnishki Geroi (II)	Simitli
13:00 EET	Nikolov 32'; Stoyanov 47'; Gushterov 79'	Report		Stadium: Struma; Attendance: 200; Referee: Stefan Spasov (Pernik)

3 December 2011	Ludogorets Razgrad	5–1	Svetkavitsa	Razgrad
13:00 EET	Genchev 15'; Marcelinho 45+1'; Gargorov 61'; Kabasele 68'; Stoyanov 72'	Report	Kanev 75'	Stadium: Ludogorets Arena; Attendance: 5,500; Referee: Hristo Ristoskov (Blagoevgrad)

3 December 2011	Spartak Pleven (III)	0–3	CSKA Sofia	Pleven
14:00 EET		Report	Galchev 21'; Krachunov 56'; Stoyanov 81'	Stadium: Slavi Aleksiev; Attendance: 15,000; Referee: Nikolay Yordanov (Sofia)

3 December 2011	Litex Lovech	5–0	Kaliakra Kavarna	Lovech
18:00 EET	Miracema 6', 64'; Yanev 19'; Todorov 28' (pen.); Djermanović 80'	Report		Stadium: Lovech; Attendance: 400; Referee: Aleksandar Kostadinov (Sofia)

4 December 2011	Botev Plovdiv (II)	2–1	Chernomorets Burgas	Plovdiv
13:00 EET	Domakinov 36'; Hristov 86'; Rahov (yellow card) 23' (yellow-red card) 27'; Aleksandrov (yellow card) 56'; Gadzhalov (yellow card) 72'	Report	Kolev 73' (pen.); Anicet (yellow card) 30' (yellow-red card) 56'; Pehlivanov (yellow card) 35'; Kishishev (yellow card) 65'; Hajri (red card) 75'	Stadium: Hristo Botev; Attendance: 8,000; Referee: Ivaylo Stoyanov (Petrich)

== Quarter-finals ==
The matches will be played on 14 March 2012. On this stage the participants will be the 8 winners from the third round. The team from the lower league has home advantage.

Note: Roman numerals in brackets denote the league tier the clubs participate in during the 2011–12 season.

14 March 2012	Botev Plovdiv (II)	0–3	Ludogorets Razgrad	Hristo Botev, Plovdiv
14:30 EET		Report	Marcelinho 21'; Aleksandrov 76'; Kabasele 88'	Attendance: 8,230; Referee: Stefan Spasov (Pernik)

14 March 2012	Litex Lovech	2–0	Minyor Pernik	Lovech, Lovech
17:30 EET	Marcelo Nicácio 45+3' (pen.); Yanev 55'	Report		Attendance: 510; Referee: Ahmed Ahmed (Burgas)

15 March 2012	Lokomotiv Plovdiv	2–1 (a.e.t.)	Levski Sofia	Lauta, Plovdiv
13:00 EET	Venkov 90+2'; Lazarov 92'	Report	Calvo 21'	Attendance: 6,340; Referee: Ivaylo Stoyanov (Petrich)

15 March 2012	Septemvri Simitli (II)	2–1	CSKA Sofia	Struma, Simitli
15:30 EET	Gushterov 31'; A. Nikolov 49'	Report	Priso 88'	Attendance: 3,060; Referee: Vladimir Valkov (Plovdiv)

== Semi-finals ==
The matches will be played on 11 April 2012. at this stage the participants will be the 4 winners from the quarter finals. The team from the lower league has home advantage.

Note: Roman numerals in brackets denote the league tier the clubs participate in during the 2011–12 season.

11 April 2012	Septemvri Simitli (II)	1−4	Ludogorets Razgrad	Struma, Simitli
16:00 EET	Mäntylä 60' (o.g.)	Report	Stoyanov 36', 76'; Kabasele 48'; Aleksandrov 78'	Referee: Stefan Spasov (Pernik)

11 April 2012	Litex Lovech	0–1	Lokomotiv Plovdiv	Lovech, Lovech
19:00 EET		Report	Bengelloun 79'	Referee: Tasko Taskov (Sofia)

== Final ==
16 May 2012
19:00 EET

Lokomotiv Plovdiv	1–2	Ludogorets Razgrad
Dakson 18'		Marcelinho 72', 79'

Lazur, Burgas
Attendance: 13,103
Referee: Stanislav Todorov (Shumen)

== See also ==
- 2011–12 A Group
- 2011–12 B Group
- 2011–12 V AFG
