= Kaloyan (disambiguation) =

Kaloyan may refer to:

== Given name ==
- Kaloyan and Desislava, 13th-century Bulgarian nobles
- Kaloyan of Bulgaria, Tsar of Bulgaria from 1196 to 1207
- Kaloyan Baev, Bulgarian wrestler (born 1972)
- Kaloyan Chakarov, Bulgarian footballer (born 1971)
- Kaloyan Cvetkov, Bulgarian footballer (born 1988)
- Kaloyan Dinchev, Bulgarian footballer (born 1980)
- Kaloyan Ivanov, Bulgarian basketball player (born 1986)
- Kaloyan Karadzhinov, Bulgarian footballer (born 1977)
- Kaloyan Kopchev, Bulgarian footballer (born 1975)
- Kaloyan Kostadinov, Bulgarian footballer (born 2002)
- Kaloyan Kostov, Bulgarian footballer (born 2004)
- Kaloyan Krastev, Bulgarian footballer (born 1999)
- Kaloyan Levterov, Bulgarian swimmer (born 2003)
- Kaloyan Stoyanov, Bulgarian footballer (born 1986)
- Kaluyan, 13th-century Greek architect from Konya
- Kotoōshū Katsunori, born Kaloyan Stefanov Mahlyanov, Bulgarian sumo wrestler (born 1983)

== Other ==
- Kaloyan Nunatak, nunatak in the Tangra Mountains
- Kaloyan (film), 1963 movie
- Tsar Kaloyan, Razgrad Province, town in Bulgaria

== See also ==
- Kaloyanovo
- Kaloyanov Peak, peak in Antarctica
