= Milen =

Milen (Bulgarian: Милен) is a Bulgarian masculine given name. Notable people with the name include:

- Milen Bonev (born 1986), Bulgarian football player, currently playing for Kaliakra Kavarna as a defender
- Milen Dobrev (born 1980), Bulgarian weightlifter
- Milen Hristov (born 1977), Bulgarian footballer who currently plays for Neftochimic Burgas as a midfielder
- Milen Lahchev (born 1987), Bulgarian footballer, currently playing as a defender for Lokomotiv Sofia
- Milen Nachev, Bulgarian/American conductor and Principal Guest Conductor with the Romanian National Radio Symphony Orchestra & Choir
- Milen Petkov (born 1974), Bulgarian football player currently playing for Dobrudzha Dobrich
- Milen Radukanov (born 1972), former Bulgarian footballer, who currently manages Botev Plovdiv
- Milen Ruskov (1966), Bulgarian writer and translator
- Milen Tanev (born 1987), Bulgarian footballer, currently playing for Beroe as a midfielder
- Milen Tsvetkov (born 1966), Bulgarian journalist and TV host
- Milen Vasilev, Bulgarian football player, currently playing for Minyor Pernik as a midfielder
- Milen Veltchev (born 1966), the finance minister of Bulgaria from 2001 until 2005
