= 2024 Men's U-20 EHF Championship =

Tournament details
- Host country: Kosovo
- City: Pristina
- Venue(s): 1 (in 1 host city)
- Dates: 13–21 July 2024
- Teams: 12 (from 1 confederation)

Final positions
- Champions: Slovakia
- Runner-up: Latvia
- Third place: Finland
- Fourth place: Luxembourg

Tournament statistics
- Matches played: 30
- Top scorer(s): (Turkey) Sadik Emre Herseklioglu (45 goals)

Official website
- Official website

The 2024 Men's U-20 EHF Championship was held in Pristina, Kosovo from 13 to 21 July 2024. Slovakia won the tournament by defeating Latvia in the final.

== Teams ==
- Belgium
- Bulgaria
- Estonia
- Finland
- Georgia
- Great Britain
- Kosovo
- Latvia
- Lithuania
- Luxembourg
- Slovakia
- Turkey

== Venue ==
As the larger arena is being renovated, the tournament was held in the smaller arena.

| 2024 Men's U-20 EHF Championship is located in Kosovo | Pristina |
|---|---|
| 2024 Men's U-20 EHF Championship is located in Kosovo | Palace of Youth and Sports (smaller arena) |
| 2024 Men's U-20 EHF Championship is located in Kosovo | Capacity: 2,800 |

== Draw ==
The draw was held on 29 February 2024 in Vienna at 15:00 (CET). Prior to the draw, Belgium, Estonia and Georgia, who all had the same EHF ranking, would be placed into a separate draw to determine each team's position in the draw. Later on, Georgia won the draw and were placed in pot 2.

| Pot 1 | Pot 2 | Pot 3 |
|---|---|---|
| Luxembourg; Finland; Latvia; Lithuania | Slovakia; Turkey; Kosovo; Georgia | Belgium; Estonia; Bulgaria; Great Britain |

== Referees ==
Referees
| Czech Republic | Jakub Uhlir; Vojtech Benus |
| Croatia | Matija Brodic; Matija Hodzic |
| Denmark | Nichlas Nygaard; Jonas Primdahl |
| Germany | Lucas Hellbusch; Darnel Jansen |

Referees
| Kosovo | Genc Bujupi; Getoar Bujupi |
| Montenegro | Milica Pavicevic; Sladana Martinovic |
| Switzerland | Linus Hardegger; Simon Hardegger |
| Ukraine | Mykola Shnyt; Volodymyr Filonenko |

== Preliminary round ==
=== Group A ===
| Pos | Team | Pld | W | D | L | GF | GA | GD | Pts | Qualification |
|---|---|---|---|---|---|---|---|---|---|---|
| 1 | Finland | 2 | 2 | 0 | 0 | 81 | 46 | +35 | 4 | Quarterfinals |
| 2 | Kosovo (H) | 2 | 1 | 0 | 1 | 50 | 61 | −11 | 2 | Quarterfinals |
| 3 | Bulgaria | 2 | 0 | 0 | 2 | 41 | 65 | −24 | 0 | 9–12 placement group |

Source: EHF
Rules for classification: 1) points; 2) head-to-head points; 3) head-to-head goal difference; 4) head-to-head number of goals scored; 5) goal difference.
(H) Hosts

| 13 July 2024; 19:15 | Kosovo | 23–22 | Bulgaria | Palace of Youth and Sports, Pristina; Referees: Hellbusch, Jansen (GER) |
| 13 July 2024; 19:15 | Mulaj 9 | (15–13) | Marev 7 | Palace of Youth and Sports, Pristina; Referees: Hellbusch, Jansen (GER) |
| 13 July 2024; 19:15 | 1× (yellow card) 6× (suspension) | Report | 3× (suspension) | Palace of Youth and Sports, Pristina; Referees: Hellbusch, Jansen (GER) |

| 14 July 2024; 14:30 | Bulgaria | 19–42 | Finland | Palace of Youth and Sports, Pristina; Referees: Uhlir, Benus (CZE) |
| 14 July 2024; 14:30 | Marev 5 | (9–21) | von Troil 11 | Palace of Youth and Sports, Pristina; Referees: Uhlir, Benus (CZE) |
| 14 July 2024; 14:30 | 5× (suspension) | Report | 1× (yellow card) 5× (suspension) | Palace of Youth and Sports, Pristina; Referees: Uhlir, Benus (CZE) |

| 15 July 2024; 19:00 | Finland | 39–27 | Kosovo | Palace of Youth and Sports, Pristina; Referees: Nygaard, Primdahl (DEN) |
| 15 July 2024; 19:00 | Sjöstedt 8 | (20–9) | Mulaj 8 | Palace of Youth and Sports, Pristina; Referees: Nygaard, Primdahl (DEN) |
| 15 July 2024; 19:00 | 1× (suspension) | Report | 1× (yellow card) 2× (suspension) | Palace of Youth and Sports, Pristina; Referees: Nygaard, Primdahl (DEN) |

=== Group B ===
| Pos | Team | Pld | W | D | L | GF | GA | GD | Pts | Qualification |
|---|---|---|---|---|---|---|---|---|---|---|
| 1 | Luxembourg | 2 | 2 | 0 | 0 | 67 | 48 | +19 | 4 | Quarterfinals |
| 2 | Turkey | 2 | 1 | 0 | 1 | 59 | 61 | −2 | 2 | Quarterfinals |
| 3 | Belgium | 2 | 0 | 0 | 2 | 52 | 69 | −17 | 0 | 9–12 placement group |

Source: EHF
Rules for classification: 1) points; 2) head-to-head points; 3) head-to-head goal difference; 4) head-to-head number of goals scored; 5) goal difference.

| 13 July 2024; 12:15 | Turkey | 37–26 | Belgium | Palace of Youth and Sports, Pristina; Referees: Brodic, Hodzic (CRO) |
| 13 July 2024; 12:15 | Herseklioglu 15 | (17–13) | Dubuc, Riske 6 | Palace of Youth and Sports, Pristina; Referees: Brodic, Hodzic (CRO) |
| 13 July 2024; 12:15 | 3× (suspension) | Report | 2× (yellow card) 3× (suspension) | Palace of Youth and Sports, Pristina; Referees: Brodic, Hodzic (CRO) |

| 14 July 2024; 12:15 | Belgium | 26–32 | Luxembourg | Palace of Youth and Sports, Pristina; Referees: Hardegger, Hardegger (SUI) |
| 14 July 2024; 12:15 | Dubuc 6 | (14–17) | Etute 8 | Palace of Youth and Sports, Pristina; Referees: Hardegger, Hardegger (SUI) |
| 14 July 2024; 12:15 | 3× (suspension) | Report | 1× (suspension) | Palace of Youth and Sports, Pristina; Referees: Hardegger, Hardegger (SUI) |

| 15 July 2024; 12:15 | Luxembourg | 35–22 | Turkey | Palace of Youth and Sports, Pristina; Referees: Hellbusch, Jansen (GER) |
| 15 July 2024; 12:15 | Etute 9 | (18–11) | Herseklioglu 6 | Palace of Youth and Sports, Pristina; Referees: Hellbusch, Jansen (GER) |
| 15 July 2024; 12:15 | 1× (yellow card) 8× (suspension) 1× (red card) | Report | 4× (suspension) | Palace of Youth and Sports, Pristina; Referees: Hellbusch, Jansen (GER) |

=== Group C ===
| Pos | Team | Pld | W | D | L | GF | GA | GD | Pts | Qualification |
|---|---|---|---|---|---|---|---|---|---|---|
| 1 | Estonia | 2 | 1 | 1 | 0 | 54 | 50 | +4 | 3 | Quarterfinals |
| 2 | Lithuania | 2 | 1 | 0 | 1 | 59 | 58 | +1 | 2 | Quarterfinals |
| 3 | Georgia | 2 | 0 | 1 | 1 | 56 | 61 | −5 | 1 | 9–12 placement group |

Source: EHF
Rules for classification: 1) points; 2) head-to-head points; 3) head-to-head goal difference; 4) head-to-head number of goals scored; 5) goal difference.

| 13 July 2024; 14:30 | Georgia | 26–26 | Estonia | Palace of Youth and Sports, Pristina; Referees: Nygaard, Primdahl (DEN) |
| 13 July 2024; 14:30 | Pantskhava 7 | (13–12) | Vare 6 | Palace of Youth and Sports, Pristina; Referees: Nygaard, Primdahl (DEN) |
| 13 July 2024; 14:30 | 1× (yellow card) 6× (suspension) | Report | 2× (yellow card) 3× (suspension) | Palace of Youth and Sports, Pristina; Referees: Nygaard, Primdahl (DEN) |

| 14 July 2024; 16:45 | Estonia | 28–24 | Lithuania | Palace of Youth and Sports, Pristina; Referees: Bujupi, Bujupi (KOS) |
| 14 July 2024; 16:45 | Koks 7 | (12–9) | Draksas, Cesna 4 | Palace of Youth and Sports, Pristina; Referees: Bujupi, Bujupi (KOS) |
| 14 July 2024; 16:45 | 7× (suspension) | Report | 4× (suspension) | Palace of Youth and Sports, Pristina; Referees: Bujupi, Bujupi (KOS) |

| 15 July 2024; 14:30 | Lithuania | 35–30 | Georgia | Palace of Youth and Sports, Pristina; Referees: Pavicevic, Martinovic (MNE) |
| 15 July 2024; 14:30 | Draksas 7 | (16–15) | Pantskhava 10 | Palace of Youth and Sports, Pristina; Referees: Pavicevic, Martinovic (MNE) |
| 15 July 2024; 14:30 | 5× (suspension) | Report | 1× (yellow card) 7× (suspension) 1× (red card) | Palace of Youth and Sports, Pristina; Referees: Pavicevic, Martinovic (MNE) |

=== Group D ===
| Pos | Team | Pld | W | D | L | GF | GA | GD | Pts | Qualification |
|---|---|---|---|---|---|---|---|---|---|---|
| 1 | Latvia | 2 | 2 | 0 | 0 | 76 | 47 | +29 | 4 | Quarterfinals |
| 2 | Slovakia | 2 | 1 | 0 | 1 | 65 | 44 | +21 | 2 | Quarterfinals |
| 3 | Great Britain | 2 | 0 | 0 | 2 | 35 | 85 | −50 | 0 | 9–12 placement group |

Source: EHF
Rules for classification: 1) points; 2) head-to-head points; 3) head-to-head goal difference; 4) head-to-head number of goals scored; 5) goal difference.

| 13 July 2024; 16:45 | Slovakia | 39–14 | Great Britain | Palace of Youth and Sports, Pristina; Referees: Pavicevic, Martinovic (MNE) |
| 13 July 2024; 16:45 | Fenár 7 | (18–4) | Leavey 4 | Palace of Youth and Sports, Pristina; Referees: Pavicevic, Martinovic (MNE) |
| 13 July 2024; 16:45 | 3× (suspension) | Report | 9× (suspension) 1× (red card) | Palace of Youth and Sports, Pristina; Referees: Pavicevic, Martinovic (MNE) |

| 14 July 2024; 19:00 | Great Britain | 21–46 | Latvia | Palace of Youth and Sports, Pristina; Referees: Shnyt, Filonenko (UKR) |
| 14 July 2024; 19:00 | Persson 6 | (7–22) | Vaškevicš 6 | Palace of Youth and Sports, Pristina; Referees: Shnyt, Filonenko (UKR) |
| 14 July 2024; 19:00 | 3× (suspension) | Report | 5× (suspension) | Palace of Youth and Sports, Pristina; Referees: Shnyt, Filonenko (UKR) |

| 15 July 2024; 16:45 | Latvia | 30–26 | Slovakia | Palace of Youth and Sports, Pristina; Referees: Brodic, Hodzic (CRO) |
| 15 July 2024; 16:45 | Bors 8 | (11–13) | Fenár 6 | Palace of Youth and Sports, Pristina; Referees: Brodic, Hodzic (CRO) |
| 15 July 2024; 16:45 | 1× (yellow card) 6× (suspension) | Report | 10× (suspension) 1× (red card) | Palace of Youth and Sports, Pristina; Referees: Brodic, Hodzic (CRO) |

== 9–12 placement group ==
| Pos | Team | Pld | W | D | L | GF | GA | GD | Pts |
|---|---|---|---|---|---|---|---|---|---|
| 1 | Belgium | 3 | 3 | 0 | 0 | 95 | 63 | +32 | 6 |
| 2 | Georgia | 3 | 2 | 0 | 1 | 100 | 86 | +14 | 4 |
| 3 | Great Britain | 3 | 1 | 0 | 2 | 68 | 96 | −28 | 2 |
| 4 | Bulgaria | 3 | 0 | 0 | 3 | 74 | 92 | −18 | 0 |

Source: EHF
Rules for classification: 1) points; 2) head-to-head points; 3) head-to-head goal difference; 4) head-to-head number of goals scored; 5) goal difference.

| 16 July 2024; 16:45 | Bulgaria | 31–34 | Georgia | Palace of Youth and Sports, Pristina; Referees: Bujupi, Bujupi (KOS) |
| 16 July 2024; 16:45 | Dimitrov 10 | (10–17) | Khelisupali 17 | Palace of Youth and Sports, Pristina; Referees: Bujupi, Bujupi (KOS) |
| 16 July 2024; 16:45 | 7× (suspension) | Report | 1× (yellow card) 4× (suspension) | Palace of Youth and Sports, Pristina; Referees: Bujupi, Bujupi (KOS) |

| 16 July 2024; 19:00 | Belgium | 30–20 | Great Britain | Palace of Youth and Sports, Pristina; Referees: Shnyt, Filonenko (UKR) |
| 16 July 2024; 19:00 | Dubuc Maes 5 | (14–13) | Chigozie 6 | Palace of Youth and Sports, Pristina; Referees: Shnyt, Filonenko (UKR) |
| 16 July 2024; 19:00 | 3× (suspension) | Report | 1× (suspension) | Palace of Youth and Sports, Pristina; Referees: Shnyt, Filonenko (UKR) |

| 18 July 2024; 16:45 | Georgia | 25–34 | Belgium | Palace of Youth and Sports, Pristina; Referees: Brodic, Hodzic (CRO) |
| 18 July 2024; 16:45 | Meliava 9 | (14–16) | Verbeke 6 | Palace of Youth and Sports, Pristina; Referees: Brodic, Hodzic (CRO) |
| 18 July 2024; 16:45 | 1× (suspension) | Report | 1× (yellow card) 1× (suspension) | Palace of Youth and Sports, Pristina; Referees: Brodic, Hodzic (CRO) |

| 18 July 2024; 19:00 | Great Britain | 27–25 | Bulgaria | Palace of Youth and Sports, Pristina; Referees: Shnyt, Filonenko (UKR) |
| 18 July 2024; 19:00 | Johnson 10 | (8–13) | Dimitrov 11 | Palace of Youth and Sports, Pristina; Referees: Shnyt, Filonenko (UKR) |
| 18 July 2024; 19:00 | | Report | 5× (suspension) | Palace of Youth and Sports, Pristina; Referees: Shnyt, Filonenko (UKR) |

| 20 July 2024; 15:00 | Georgia | 41–21 | Great Britain | Palace of Youth and Sports, Pristina; Referees: Uhlir, Benus (CZE) |
| 20 July 2024; 15:00 | Pantskhava 9 | (21–8) | Persson, Wellbelove 4 | Palace of Youth and Sports, Pristina; Referees: Uhlir, Benus (CZE) |
| 20 July 2024; 15:00 | 2× (suspension) | Report | 2× (suspension) | Palace of Youth and Sports, Pristina; Referees: Uhlir, Benus (CZE) |

| 20 July 2024; 17:30 | Bulgaria | 18–31 | Belgium | Palace of Youth and Sports, Pristina; Referees: Hardegger, Hardegger (SUI) |
| 20 July 2024; 17:30 | Petkov 8 | (8–18) | Dubuc 10 | Palace of Youth and Sports, Pristina; Referees: Hardegger, Hardegger (SUI) |
| 20 July 2024; 17:30 | 2× (suspension) | Report | 2× (suspension) | Palace of Youth and Sports, Pristina; Referees: Hardegger, Hardegger (SUI) |

== Knockout stage ==
Quarter-finals
17 July
Finland | 45
Turkey | 35
17 July
Latvia | 43
Lithuania | 31
17 July
Luxembourg | 27
Kosovo | 22
17 July
Estonia | 27
Slovakia | 28

Semi-finals
19 July
Finland | 31
Latvia | 36
19 July
Luxembourg | 24
Slovakia | 36

Final
21 July
Latvia | 25
Slovakia | 31
Third place
21 July
Finland | 36
Luxembourg | 35

=== 5–8 classification bracket ===
Semifinals
19 July
Turkey | 35
Lithuania | 34
19 July
Kosovo | 18
Estonia | 28

5th place match
21 July
Turkey | 28
Estonia | 30
7th place match
21 July
Lithuania | 38
Kosovo | 32

=== Quarterfinals ===
| 17 July 2024; 12:15 | Latvia | 43–31 | Lithuania | Palace of Youth and Sports, Pristina; Referees: Nygaard, Primdahl (DEN) |
| 17 July 2024; 12:15 | Serafimovics 11 | (19–14) | Kairys 12 | Palace of Youth and Sports, Pristina; Referees: Nygaard, Primdahl (DEN) |
| 17 July 2024; 12:15 | 5× (suspension) | Report | 2× (yellow card) 4× (suspension) | Palace of Youth and Sports, Pristina; Referees: Nygaard, Primdahl (DEN) |

| 17 July 2024; 14:30 | Estonia | 27–28 | Slovakia | Palace of Youth and Sports, Pristina; Referees: Pavicevic, Martinovic (MNE) |
| 17 July 2024; 14:30 | Vare 7 | (12–15) | Fenár, Jurkovic 7 | Palace of Youth and Sports, Pristina; Referees: Pavicevic, Martinovic (MNE) |
| 17 July 2024; 14:30 | 1× (yellow card) 6× (suspension) | Report | 4× (suspension) | Palace of Youth and Sports, Pristina; Referees: Pavicevic, Martinovic (MNE) |

| 17 July 2024; 16:45 | Luxembourg | 27–22 | Kosovo | Palace of Youth and Sports, Pristina; Referees: Uhlir, Benus (CZE) |
| 17 July 2024; 16:45 | Etute, Richard 6 | (14–10) | Mulaj 7 | Palace of Youth and Sports, Pristina; Referees: Uhlir, Benus (CZE) |
| 17 July 2024; 16:45 | 7× (suspension) | Report | 1× (yellow card) 5× (suspension) | Palace of Youth and Sports, Pristina; Referees: Uhlir, Benus (CZE) |

| 17 July 2024; 19:00 | Finland | 45–35 | Turkey | Palace of Youth and Sports, Pristina; Referees: Hardegger, Hardegger (SUI) |
| 17 July 2024; 19:00 | Reenpää 8 | (20–15) | Yildiz 10 | Palace of Youth and Sports, Pristina; Referees: Hardegger, Hardegger (SUI) |
| 17 July 2024; 19:00 | 2× (suspension) | Report | 3× (suspension) | Palace of Youth and Sports, Pristina; Referees: Hardegger, Hardegger (SUI) |

=== 5–8th place semifinals ===
| 19 July 2024; 12:15 | Turkey | 35–34 | Lithuania | Palace of Youth and Sports, Pristina; Referees: Bujupi, Bujupi (KOS) |
| 19 July 2024; 12:15 | Herseklioglu 12 | (19–17) | Kairys 8 | Palace of Youth and Sports, Pristina; Referees: Bujupi, Bujupi (KOS) |
| 19 July 2024; 12:15 | 1× (yellow card) 4× (suspension) | Report | 1× (suspension) | Palace of Youth and Sports, Pristina; Referees: Bujupi, Bujupi (KOS) |

| 19 July 2024; 14:30 | Kosovo | 18–28 | Estonia | Palace of Youth and Sports, Pristina; Referees: Hellbusch, Jansen (GER) |
| 19 July 2024; 14:30 | Mulaj 4 | (8–15) | Koks, Kosmirak 4 | Palace of Youth and Sports, Pristina; Referees: Hellbusch, Jansen (GER) |
| 19 July 2024; 14:30 | 2× (suspension) | Report | 2× (yellow card) 3× (suspension) | Palace of Youth and Sports, Pristina; Referees: Hellbusch, Jansen (GER) |

=== Semifinals ===
| 19 July 2024; 16:45 | Finland | 31–36 | Latvia | Palace of Youth and Sports, Pristina; Referees: Pavicevic, Martinovic (MNE) |
| 19 July 2024; 16:45 | von Troil 12 | (12–15) | Kalnins, Serafimovics 9 | Palace of Youth and Sports, Pristina; Referees: Pavicevic, Martinovic (MNE) |
| 19 July 2024; 16:45 | 1× (yellow card) 5× (suspension) | Report | 1× (yellow card) 5× (suspension) 1× (red card) | Palace of Youth and Sports, Pristina; Referees: Pavicevic, Martinovic (MNE) |

| 19 July 2024; 19:00 | Luxembourg | 24–36 | Slovakia | Palace of Youth and Sports, Pristina; Referees: Nygaard, Primdahl (DEN) |
| 19 July 2024; 19:00 | Kaysen 6 | (11–17) | Fenár, Mital 8 | Palace of Youth and Sports, Pristina; Referees: Nygaard, Primdahl (DEN) |
| 19 July 2024; 19:00 | 4× (suspension) 1× (red card) | Report | 4× (suspension) | Palace of Youth and Sports, Pristina; Referees: Nygaard, Primdahl (DEN) |

=== Seventh place game ===
| 21 July 2024; 12:00 | Lithuania | 38–32 | Kosovo | Palace of Youth and Sports, Pristina; Referees: Brodic, Hodzic (CRO) |
| 21 July 2024; 12:00 | Janušonis 6 | (15–18) | Mulaj 8 | Palace of Youth and Sports, Pristina; Referees: Brodic, Hodzic (CRO) |
| 21 July 2024; 12:00 | 1× (yellow card) 2× (suspension) | Report | 3× (suspension) | Palace of Youth and Sports, Pristina; Referees: Brodic, Hodzic (CRO) |

=== Fifth place game ===
| 21 July 2024; 14:15 | Turkey | 28–30 | Estonia | Palace of Youth and Sports, Pristina; Referees: Nygaard, Primdahl (DEN) |
| 21 July 2024; 14:15 | Herseklioglu 6 | (11–15) | three players 6 | Palace of Youth and Sports, Pristina; Referees: Nygaard, Primdahl (DEN) |
| 21 July 2024; 14:15 | 1× (yellow card) 3× (suspension) | Report | 2× (suspension) | Palace of Youth and Sports, Pristina; Referees: Nygaard, Primdahl (DEN) |

=== Third place game ===
| 21 July 2024; 16:30 | Finland | 36–35 | Luxembourg | Palace of Youth and Sports, Pristina; Referees: Hardegger, Hardegger (SUI) |
| 21 July 2024; 16:30 | Leppänen 9 | (10–14) | Etute, Meunier 6 | Palace of Youth and Sports, Pristina; Referees: Hardegger, Hardegger (SUI) |
| 21 July 2024; 16:30 | 1× (yellow card) 3× (suspension) | Report | 5× (suspension) 2× (red card) | Palace of Youth and Sports, Pristina; Referees: Hardegger, Hardegger (SUI) |

=== Final ===
| 21 July 2024; 18:45 | Latvia | 25–31 | Slovakia | Palace of Youth and Sports, Pristina; Referees: Hellbusch, Jansen (GER) |
| 21 July 2024; 18:45 | Serafimovics 7 | (11–14) | Jurkovic 7 | Palace of Youth and Sports, Pristina; Referees: Hellbusch, Jansen (GER) |
| 21 July 2024; 18:45 | 1× (yellow card) 2× (suspension) | Report | 4× (suspension) | Palace of Youth and Sports, Pristina; Referees: Hellbusch, Jansen (GER) |

== Final ranking ==
| Rank | Team |
|---|---|
| 1st place, gold medalist(s) | Slovakia |
| 2nd place, silver medalist(s) | Latvia |
| 3rd place, bronze medalist(s) | Finland |
| 4 | Luxembourg |
| 5 | Estonia |
| 6 | Turkey |
| 7 | Lithuania |
| 8 | Kosovo |
| 9 | Belgium |
| 10 | Georgia |
| 11 | Great Britain |
| 12 | Bulgaria |

== See also ==
- 2024 European Men's U-20 Handball Championship
- 2024 European Men's U-18 Handball Championship
- 2024 Men's U-18 EHF Championship I
- 2024 Men's U-18 EHF Championship II
- 2025 IHF Men's U19 Handball World Championship
- 2025 IHF Men's U21 Handball World Championship
