= Raychev =

Raychev (Bulgarian: Райчев) is a Bulgarian surname. Notable people with the surname include:

- Alexander Raichev (1922–2003), Bulgarian music educator and composer
- Ivan Raychev (born 1977), Bulgarian footballer
- Valentin Raychev (born 1958), Bulgarian wrestler
