= Chernev (surname) =

Chernev is a surname. Notable people with the surname include:

- Irving Chernev (1900–1981), Russian-American chess author
- Lyubomir Chernev (born 1986), Bulgarian footballer
- Nedelcho Chernev, Bulgarian film director
- Petar Chernev, mayor of Sofia, Bulgaria
- Pavel Chernev (1969–2016), Bulgarian politician
