= 2024 Men's U-18 EHF Championship II =

Tournament details
- Host country: Kosovo
- City: Pristina
- Venue(s): 1 (in 1 host city)
- Dates: 12–18 August 2024
- Teams: 7 (from 1 confederation)

Final positions
- Champions: Kosovo
- Runner-up: Georgia
- Third place: Belgium
- Fourth place: Luxembourg

Tournament statistics
- Matches played: 15
- Top scorer(s): (Kosovo) Olsi Mulaj (44 goals)

Official website
- Official website

The 2024 Men's U-18 EHF Championship II was held in Pristina, Kosovo from 12 to 18 August 2024. Kosovo won the tournament by defeating Georgia in the final.

== Teams ==
- Azerbaijan
- Belgium
- Bulgaria
- Georgia
- Great Britain
- Kosovo
- Luxembourg

== Venue ==
2024 Men's U-18 EHF Championship II is located in Kosovo	Pristina
2024 Men's U-18 EHF Championship II is located in Kosovo	Palace of Youth and Sports (smaller arena)
2024 Men's U-18 EHF Championship II is located in Kosovo	Capacity: 2,800

== Draw ==
The draw was held on 29 February 2024 in Vienna at 15:00 (CET).

Pot 1	Pot 2	Pot 3	Pot 4
Kosovo; Luxembourg	Georgia; Bulgaria	Great Britain; Belgium	Azerbaijan

== Referees ==
Referees
France	Mathilde Cournil; Loriane Lamour
Italy	Stefano Riello; Niccolò Panetta
Kosovo	Sherif Xhema; Besfort Jahja
Romania	Ionut Marian Cazan; Gesur Suliman

== Preliminary round ==
=== Group A ===
Pos	Team	Pld	W	D	L	GF	GA	GD	Pts	Qualification
1	Belgium	3	3	0	0	96	68	+28	6	Semifinals
2	Kosovo (H)	3	2	0	1	107	76	+31	4	Semifinals
3	Bulgaria	3	1	0	2	94	86	+8	2	5–7 classification group
4	Azerbaijan	3	0	0	3	65	132	−67	0	5–7 classification group

Source: EHF
Rules for classification: 1) points; 2) head-to-head points; 3) head-to-head goal difference; 4) head-to-head number of goals scored; 5) goal difference.
(H) Hosts

12 August 2024; 16:15	Azerbaijan	22–48	Bulgaria	Palace of Youth and Sports, Pristina; Referees: Cournil, Lamour (FRA)
12 August 2024; 16:15	Huseynov 6	(9–22)	Petkov 10	Palace of Youth and Sports, Pristina; Referees: Cournil, Lamour (FRA)
12 August 2024; 16:15	3× (suspension) 1× (red card)	Report	1× (yellow card) 5× (suspension)	Palace of Youth and Sports, Pristina; Referees: Cournil, Lamour (FRA)

12 August 2024; 18:30	Belgium	29–26	Kosovo	Palace of Youth and Sports, Pristina; Referees: Riello, Panetta (ITA)
12 August 2024; 18:30	Fransen 10	(14–15)	Imeraj 9	Palace of Youth and Sports, Pristina; Referees: Riello, Panetta (ITA)
12 August 2024; 18:30	1× (yellow card) 3× (suspension)	Report	1× (yellow card) 7× (suspension) 1× (red card)	Palace of Youth and Sports, Pristina; Referees: Riello, Panetta (ITA)

13 August 2024; 16:15	Azerbaijan	16–40	Belgium	Palace of Youth and Sports, Pristina; Referees: Cazan, Suliman (ROU)
13 August 2024; 16:15	Huseynov 7	(9–19)	Fransen, Herné 5	Palace of Youth and Sports, Pristina; Referees: Cazan, Suliman (ROU)
13 August 2024; 16:15	7× (suspension)	Report	1× (yellow card) 6× (suspension)	Palace of Youth and Sports, Pristina; Referees: Cazan, Suliman (ROU)

13 August 2024; 18:30	Bulgaria	20–37	Kosovo	Palace of Youth and Sports, Pristina; Referees: Cournil, Lamour (FRA)
13 August 2024; 18:30	Angelov 4	(11–15)	Malaj 11	Palace of Youth and Sports, Pristina; Referees: Cournil, Lamour (FRA)
13 August 2024; 18:30	1× (yellow card) 1× (suspension)	Report	1× (yellow card) 3× (suspension)	Palace of Youth and Sports, Pristina; Referees: Cournil, Lamour (FRA)

15 August 2024; 16:15	Belgium	27–26	Bulgaria	Palace of Youth and Sports, Pristina; Referees: Cazan, Suliman (ROU)
15 August 2024; 16:15	Piel 8	(13–14)	Petkov 10	Palace of Youth and Sports, Pristina; Referees: Cazan, Suliman (ROU)
15 August 2024; 16:15	1× (yellow card) 1× (suspension)	Report	1× (yellow card) 2× (suspension)	Palace of Youth and Sports, Pristina; Referees: Cazan, Suliman (ROU)

15 August 2024; 18:30	Kosovo	44–27	Azerbaijan	Palace of Youth and Sports, Pristina; Referees: Riello, Panetta (ITA)
15 August 2024; 18:30	three players 7	(22–14)	Huseynov 5	Palace of Youth and Sports, Pristina; Referees: Riello, Panetta (ITA)
15 August 2024; 18:30	4× (suspension) 1× (red card)	Report	1× (yellow card) 1× (suspension)	Palace of Youth and Sports, Pristina; Referees: Riello, Panetta (ITA)

=== Group B ===
Pos	Team	Pld	W	D	L	GF	GA	GD	Pts	Qualification
1	Luxembourg	2	2	0	0	57	57	0	4	Semifinals
2	Georgia	2	1	0	1	72	72	0	2	Semifinals
3	Great Britain	2	0	0	2	60	74	−14	0	5–7 classification group

Source: EHF
Rules for classification: 1) points; 2) head-to-head points; 3) head-to-head goal difference; 4) head-to-head number of goals scored; 5) goal difference.

12 August 2024; 14:00	Great Britain	24–35	Luxembourg	Palace of Youth and Sports, Pristina; Referees: Xhema, Jahja (KOS)
12 August 2024; 14:00	Jones 5	(12–18)	Wener 9	Palace of Youth and Sports, Pristina; Referees: Xhema, Jahja (KOS)
12 August 2024; 14:00	1× (yellow card) 4× (suspension)	Report	1× (yellow card) 5× (suspension)	Palace of Youth and Sports, Pristina; Referees: Xhema, Jahja (KOS)

13 August 2024; 14:00	Great Britain	36–39	Georgia	Palace of Youth and Sports, Pristina; Referees: Riello, Panetta (ITA)
13 August 2024; 14:00	Ludewig-Vieira 10	(18–19)	Shioshvili 12	Palace of Youth and Sports, Pristina; Referees: Riello, Panetta (ITA)
13 August 2024; 14:00	1× (yellow card) 2× (suspension)	Report	3× (suspension)	Palace of Youth and Sports, Pristina; Referees: Riello, Panetta (ITA)

15 August 2024; 14:00	Georgia	33–36	Luxembourg	Palace of Youth and Sports, Pristina; Referees: Xhema, Jahja (KOS)
15 August 2024; 14:00	Grishikashvili 12	(15–16)	Mousel 13	Palace of Youth and Sports, Pristina; Referees: Xhema, Jahja (KOS)
15 August 2024; 14:00	1× (yellow card) 5× (suspension)	Report	1× (yellow card) 8× (suspension) 1× (red card)	Palace of Youth and Sports, Pristina; Referees: Xhema, Jahja (KOS)

== Knockout stage ==
=== 5–7 classification group ===
Pos	Team	Pld	W	D	L	GF	GA	GD	Pts	Qualification
1	Bulgaria	2	2	0	0	87	51	+36	4	Fifth place
2	Great Britain	2	1	0	1	63	62	+1	2	Sixth place
3	Azerbaijan	2	0	0	2	45	82	−37	0	Seventh place

Source: EHF
Rules for classification: 1) points; 2) head-to-head points; 3) head-to-head goal difference; 4) head-to-head number of goals scored; 5) goal difference.

17 August 2024; 14:00	Great Britain	29–39	Bulgaria	Palace of Youth and Sports, Pristina; Referees: Cournil, Lamour (FRA)
17 August 2024; 14:00	Mines 9	(13–20)	Petkov 11	Palace of Youth and Sports, Pristina; Referees: Cournil, Lamour (FRA)
17 August 2024; 14:00	3× (suspension)	Report	3× (suspension)	Palace of Youth and Sports, Pristina; Referees: Cournil, Lamour (FRA)

18 August 2024; 12:30	Azerbaijan	23–34	Great Britain	Palace of Youth and Sports, Pristina; Referees: Riello, Panetta (ITA)
18 August 2024; 12:30	Mammadzada 6	(10–18)	Mines 8	Palace of Youth and Sports, Pristina; Referees: Riello, Panetta (ITA)
18 August 2024; 12:30	1× (yellow card) 9× (suspension)	Report	1× (yellow card) 11× (suspension) 1× (red card)	Palace of Youth and Sports, Pristina; Referees: Riello, Panetta (ITA)

=== Semifinals ===
Semi-finals
17 August
Belgium	47
Georgia	48
17 August
Luxembourg	20
Kosovo	33

Final
18 August
Georgia	22
Kosovo	30
Third place
18 August
Belgium	36
Luxembourg	22

17 August 2024; 16:15	Belgium	47–48	Georgia	Palace of Youth and Sports, Pristina; Referees: Xhema, Jahja (KOS)
17 August 2024; 16:15	Fransen 11	(20–19)	Grishikashvili 14	Palace of Youth and Sports, Pristina; Referees: Xhema, Jahja (KOS)
17 August 2024; 16:15	6× (suspension)	Report	5× (suspension)	Palace of Youth and Sports, Pristina; Referees: Xhema, Jahja (KOS)

17 August 2024; 18:30	Luxembourg	20–33	Kosovo	Palace of Youth and Sports, Pristina; Referees: Cazan, Suliman (ROU)
17 August 2024; 18:30	Fancelli 7	(9–19)	Mulaj 8	Palace of Youth and Sports, Pristina; Referees: Cazan, Suliman (ROU)
17 August 2024; 18:30	2× (suspension)	Report	1× (yellow card) 4× (suspension)	Palace of Youth and Sports, Pristina; Referees: Cazan, Suliman (ROU)

=== Third place game ===
18 August 2024; 14:45	Belgium	36–22	Luxembourg	Palace of Youth and Sports, Pristina; Referees: Xhema, Jahja (KOS)
18 August 2024; 14:45	De Regge 6	(17–13)	Wener 7	Palace of Youth and Sports, Pristina; Referees: Xhema, Jahja (KOS)
18 August 2024; 14:45	1× (yellow card) 4× (suspension)	Report	6× (suspension)	Palace of Youth and Sports, Pristina; Referees: Xhema, Jahja (KOS)

=== Final ===
18 August 2024; 17:00	Georgia	22–30	Kosovo	Palace of Youth and Sports, Pristina; Referees: Cournil, Lamour (FRA)
18 August 2024; 17:00	Kharebashvili, Putkaradze 5	(12–16)	Mulaj 11	Palace of Youth and Sports, Pristina; Referees: Cournil, Lamour (FRA)
18 August 2024; 17:00	2× (suspension)	Report	3× (suspension)	Palace of Youth and Sports, Pristina; Referees: Cournil, Lamour (FRA)

== Final ranking ==
Rank	Team
1st place, gold medalist(s)	Kosovo
2nd place, silver medalist(s)	Georgia
3rd place, bronze medalist(s)	Belgium
4	Luxembourg
5	Bulgaria
6	Great Britain
7	Azerbaijan

== See also ==
- 2024 European Men's U-18 Handball Championship
- 2024 Men's U-18 EHF Championship I
- 2024 Men's U-20 EHF Championship
- 2024 European Men's U-20 Handball Championship
- 2025 IHF Men's U19 Handball World Championship
- 2025 IHF Men's U21 Handball World Championship
