= Tsonko Tsonev =

Bulgarian politician (born 1967)

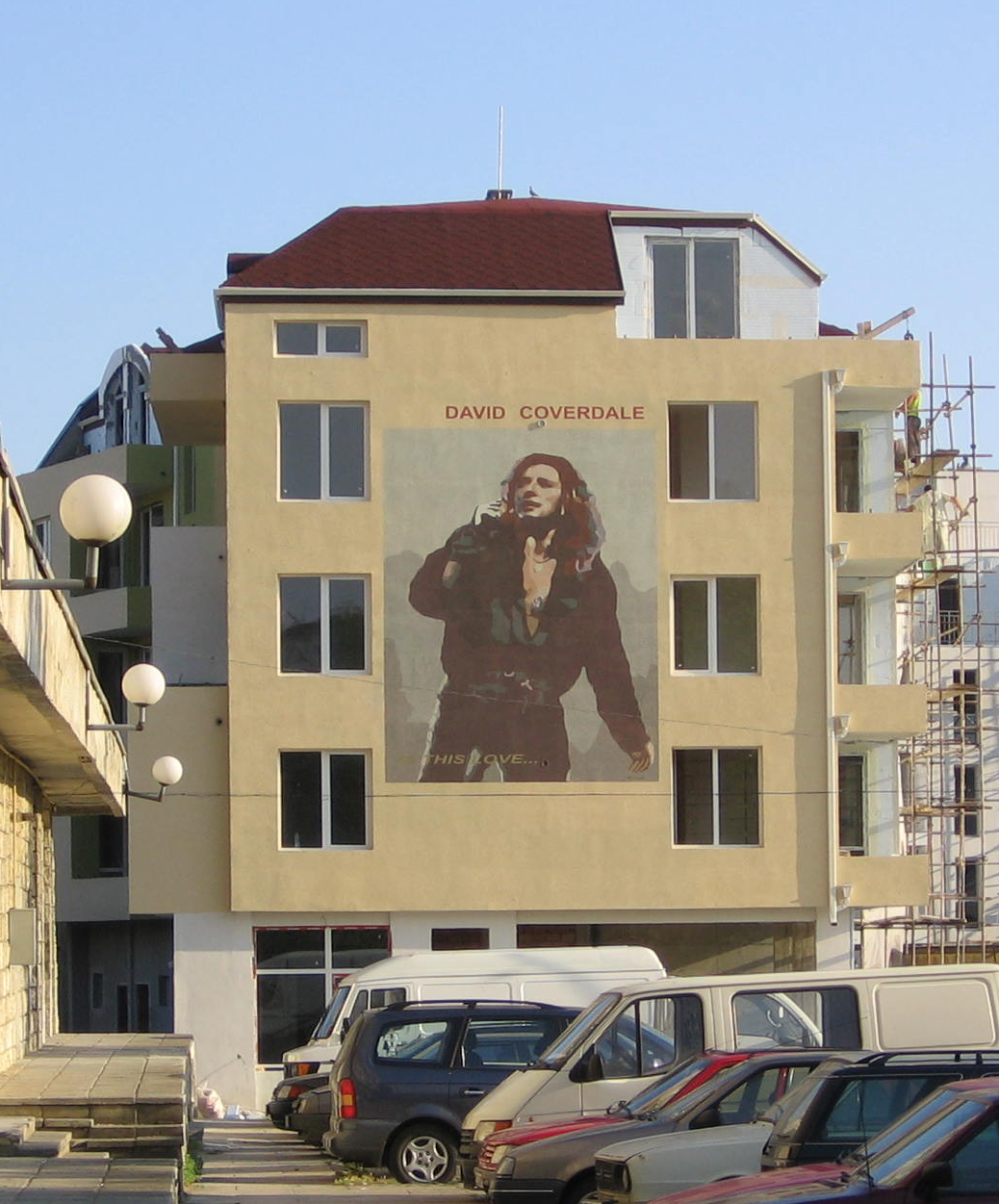
On Tsonev's idea, apartment blocks in Kavarna have been decorated with murals depicting rock stars (David Coverdale is shown here)

Tsonko Zdravkov Tsonev (Bulgarian: Цонко Здравков Цонев) (born 3 June 1967) was the mayor of Kavarna, a town on the Black Sea coast of Dobrich Province, Bulgaria from 2003 to 2015. An avid hard rock and heavy metal fan, Tsonev is notable for turning Kavarna into the "rock capital of Bulgaria", regularly organizing major rock concerts in the town. For his contributions to Kavarna and Bulgaria, he was named the 2005 Man of the Year by the Club M magazine.As of 2005, he is the owner of the Bulgarian A PFG football club PFC Kaliakra Kavarna.

Born in the town, Tsonev graduated the Mathematical High School in Dobrich and then studied Law at Sofia University. He got acquainted with rock music in the 1970s while accompanying his mother in Slovakia, Poland, the Czech Republic and Hungary. In 1994–1995, Tsonev was the legal adviser of Kavarna municipality and then served one term as a member of the town council, until 1999. During his time as a mayor, Tsonev brought bands like Heaven and Hell, Manowar, Deep Purple and Motörhead to the small Bulgarian resort town, as well as reducing unemployment and promoting the development of the region's culture and infrastructure.

Tsonev was initially a member of the Union of Democratic Forces, before he was expelled from the party for anti-statute behaviour. In 2006, he joined Boyko Borisov's Citizens for European Development of Bulgaria. Tsonev is jokingly referred to as the Kmetal (Cyrillic: кметъл; in Bulgarian, a portmanteau of kmet, "mayor" and metal), a nickname he has embraced himself.
