= Feodor Koenemann =

Russian pianist and composer (1873–1937)

Feodor Feodorovich Koenemann (sometimes transliterated as Fyodor Keneman; Russian: Фёдор Фёдорович Кёнеман; 20 April [O.S. 8 April] 1873 – 29 March 1937) was a Russian pianist, composer and music teacher.

His last name originated from the Prussian family name Könemann of his father Friedrich Napoleon Könemann (Moscow, 27 February 1838 – Moscow, 23 March 1903).

== Biography ==
Born in Moscow, Feodor Koenemann was trained from 1892 to 1897 at the Moscow Conservatory under Nikolay Zverev (1892–1895, piano), Vasily Safonov (1895–1897, piano), Anton Arensky, Sergei Taneyev and Mikhail Ippolitov-Ivanov (1897, Music Theory). He was graduated in 1897 with the Great Gold Medal with two specialities – pianist and music theory.

From 1896 to 1897 Koenemann, being a student, worked as a piano teacher at the Moscow Aleksandrovsky Institute (Institute for Noble Maidens).

After graduating from the Moscow Conservatory in 1897, Koenemann moved for two years to Astrakhan where he was appointed as a director and a piano teacher of the Astrakhan Music Classes. He also organized in Astrakhan the city chorus and the symphony orchestra, finding musicians among the music teachers, students and the military bands. In 1899 he was called back to Moscow to become a piano teacher at the Moscow Conservatory, and from 1899 to 1901 he was also a conductor of the Russian Choral Society in Moscow.

For the grand opening of the Great Hall of the Moscow Conservatory on 7 April 1901, Koenemann wrote the cantata-hymn, which became the official anthem of the Moscow Conservatory.

In 1912, Koenemann became a professor at the Moscow Conservatory and was teaching piano until his retirement in 1932.

He died in Moscow.

== Works ==
Koenemann wrote over one hundred works. He also translated into Russian a theoretical work by Ebenezer Prout, "The Orchestra".

In 1896, he met Feodor Chaliapin who just moved to Moscow from St. Petersburg to sing at the Moscow Private Opera owned by Savva Mamontov. Koenemann started a twenty-four-year collaboration with Chaliapin, both as an accompanist and arranger; his arrangement of The Volga Boatmen's Song made the song well-known abroad after Chaliapin's emigration. Koenemann and Chaliapin – the "Two Feodors" –created the perfect duet – Koenemann was a virtuoso pianist, and Chaliapin – was a singer-wunderkind. Chaliapin was 66 days older than Koenemann.

=== Selected recordings ===
- Как король шёл на войну (When the King Went Forth to War)
