= Petar Gargov =

Bulgarian footballer and manager

Personal information
- Date of birth: 11 April 1983 (age 43)
- Place of birth: Bulgaria
- Position: Goalkeeper

International career
Years	Team	Apps	(Gls)
- Bulgaria U21

Petar Gargov (Bulgarian: Петър Гаргов) (born 11 April 1983) is a former Bulgarian footballer and manager.

== Career ==
In his playing days, Gargov represented Bourgas-based Chernomorets, Neftochimic and Master as well as OFC Pomorie. Gargov was formerly part of the Bulgaria U21 national team, receiving his first call-up in 2005. Following his retirement, he worked as a goalkeeping coach at Master.
