= Alexandre Dubuque =

Russian composer and pianist (1812–1897)

Alexandre Ivanovich Dubuque
- Александр Иванович Дюбюк
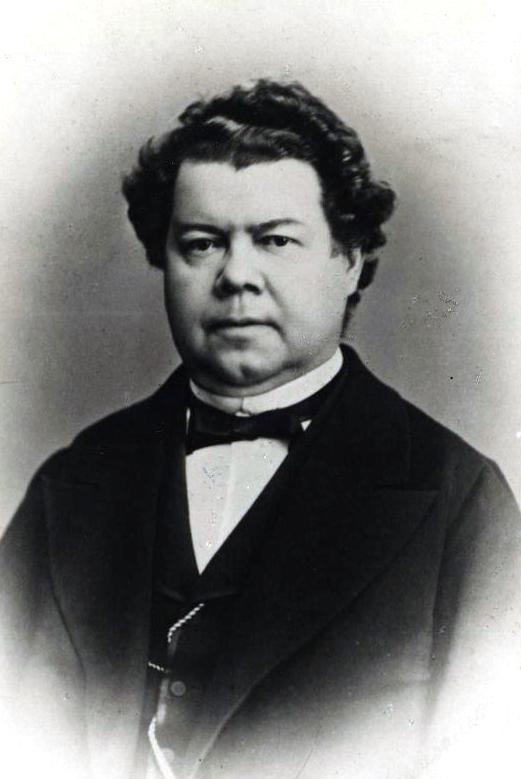
- Alexandre Dubuque in 1880
- Born: March 3, 1812; Moscow, Russia
- Died: January 8, 1898 (aged 85); Moscow, Russia
- Burial place: Vagankovo Cemetery
- Occupations: Pianist; composer; teacher

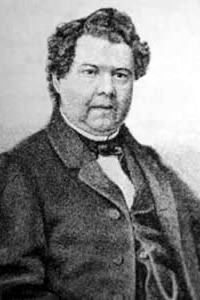
Alexandre Dubuque

Alexandre Ivanovich Dubuque, also Alexander and Dubuc (Russian: Алекса́ндр Ива́нович Дюбю́к, romanized: Aleksandr Ivanovich Diubiuk; 3 March [O.S. 20 February] 1812 – 8 January 1898 [O.S. 27 December 1897]), was a Russian pianist, composer and teacher of French descent.

== Life ==
Alexandre Dubuque was born in Moscow on 3 March 1812. His father was a refugee from the French Revolution who had fled to Russia. He studied piano under the tutelage of John Field.

As a composer he mainly wrote works for solo piano and songs. His most significant work was 130 russkikh narodnïkh pesen (English: 130 Russian folksongs; first published in Moscow in c. 1855 and republished in 1865). One of his other works was "Do not scold me, my darling" (Russian: Не брани меня, родная), which was played by Léon Theremin around the 1950s, and later by Kaia Galina Urb with Heiki Mätlik. Other compositions include the capriccio Le rossignol d’Alabieff, Album pour les enfants (1866, Moscow), and 3 études dans le style fugue opp.95–7 among many others.

A respected piano pedagogue, Dubuque authored the methodology book Tekhnika fortepiannoy igrï (1866, Moscow) and taught at the Moscow Conservatory from 1866 to 1872. His students included Mily Balakirev, Nikolay Kashkin, Herman Laroche, and Nikolai Zverev.

Dubuque died in Moscow on 8 January 1898.

== Students ==
- Mily Balakirev
- Nikolai Zverev

== Sources ==
- "Дюбюк, Александр Иванович" . Brockhaus and Efron Encyclopedic Dictionary (in Russian). 1906.
