= Milen Hristov =

Bulgarian footballer

Personal information
- Full name: Milen Hristov Hristov
- Date of birth: 20 March 1977 (age 49)
- Place of birth: Bulgaria
- Height: 1.83 m (6 ft 0 in)
- Position: Attacking midfielder

Senior career*
Years	Team	Apps	(Gls)
1995–1998	Metalik Sopot		
1998–2000	Naftex Burgas	6	(1)
2000–2001	Slanchev Bryag		
2001–2002	Naftex Burgas	22	(2)
2002–2005	Spartak Varna	27	(0)
2005–2007	Chernomorets Burgas		
2007	Kaliakra Kavarna		
2008	Haskovo	11	(1)
2008–2009	Svetkavitsa	40	(11)
2010–2012	Neftochimic 1986		

Managerial career
- 2013–2014: Neftochimic 1986 (youth coach)
- * Club domestic league appearances and goals

Milen Hristov (born 20 March 1977) is a Bulgarian footballer who is coach at Neftochimic Burgas.
