= Nikolai Zverev =

Russian pianist and teacher

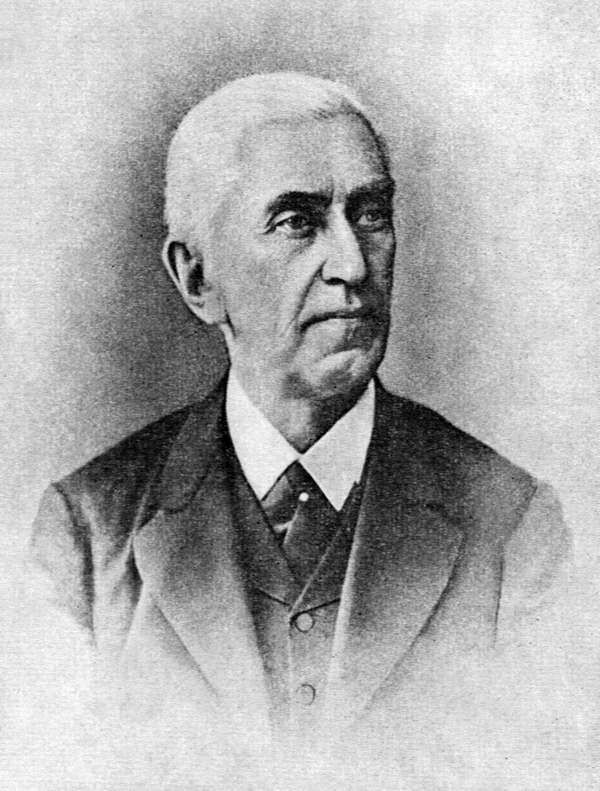

Nikolai Sergeyevich Zverev (Russian: Николай Серге́евич Зве́рев, sometimes transliterated Nikolai Zveref; 25 March [O.S. 13 March] 1833 – 12 October [O.S. 30 September] 1893) was a Russian pianist and teacher known for his pupils Alexander Siloti, Sergei Rachmaninoff, Alexander Scriabin, Konstantin Igumnov, Aleksandr Goldenweiser, and others.

== Life ==
Zverev was born in 1833 in Volokolamsk, Russia, into an aristocratic family. He attended Moscow State University, studying mathematics and physics, while taking piano lessons from Alexander Dubuque (1812–1898). He did not graduate, because he inherited a large family fortune, and moved to Saint Petersburg to become a civil servant. While there, he continued to study piano with Adolf von Henselt, who emphasized the importance of practice, which was the basis of Zverev's own strict regime that he required of his students.

Unfulfilled with civil service, and persuaded by Dubuque, he returned to Moscow in 1867 to become a private teacher. In 1870, Nikolai Rubinstein asked him to teach at the Moscow Conservatory, which he did. At one point, he also studied harmony with Tchaikovsky. Zverev never married. He died at the age of 60, in 1893.

== Teaching methods ==
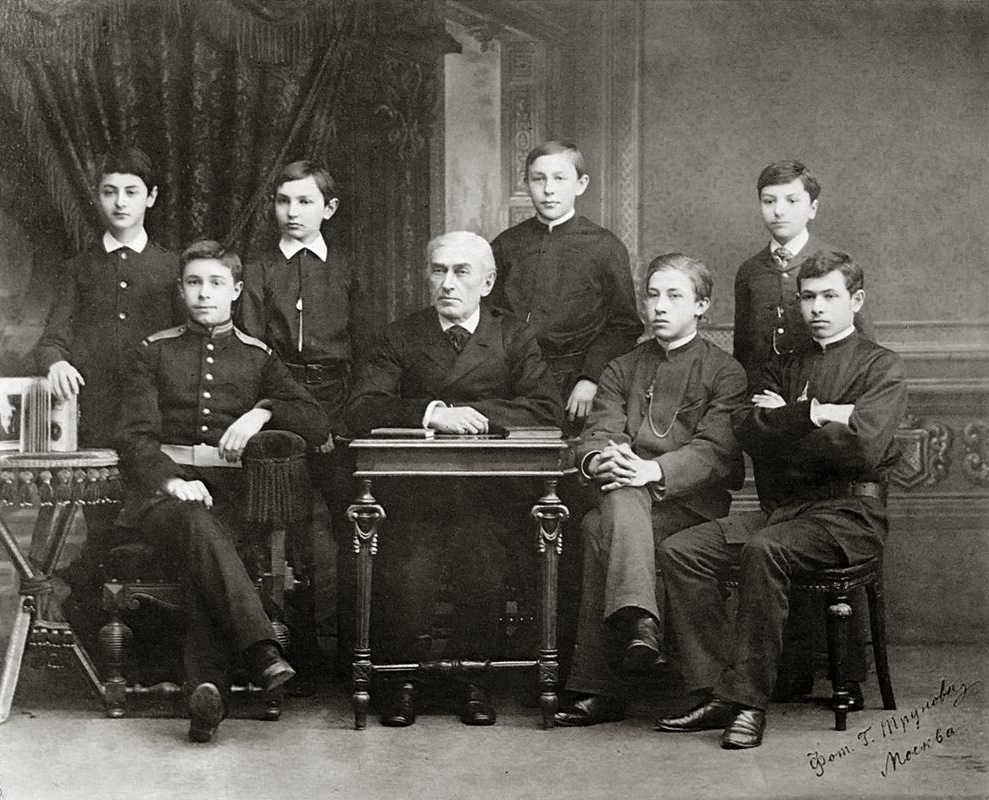
Zverev (center) and the students he housed, from left to right, Samuelson, Scriabin, Maximov, Rachmaninoff, Chernyaev, Keneman, and Pressman.

Pupils had to audition to become a student of Zverev's. Once accepted, they would move into his house.

Rachmaninoff's recollections are of interest:

I entered Zverev's home with a heavy heart and foreboding, having heard tell of his severity and 'heavy hand', which he had no qualms of resorting to. Indeed, we were able to witness proof of this latter: Zverev had a temper, and could launch himself at a person fists flailing, or hurl some object at the offender. I myself had been the object of his fury on three or four occasions…

But all other talk of his exacting and severe manner were false. This was a man of rare intellect, generosity and kindness. He commanded a great deal of respect among the best people of his time.

Indeed, discipline entered my life. God forbid that I leave the piano five minutes before my time of three hours was up! Or one uncompleted note – such cases were capable of stirring him up into a fearsome temper. However, all our achievements and diligence paid off: he drove us, his pupils, to various houses with concerts. When I finished playing, Zverev said: "Now that is how one should play the piano!"

The impression was that he was quite mad about us, his pupils. He never took a single coin from us as payment: neither for lessons, nor for board (after all, we lived in his house). He dressed us at the best tailors, we never missed a premiere at Moscow theatres – musical or drama. Of course, no really good concert went unnoticed. And that was a time when there was so much on offer: take the famous historical concerts of Anton Rubinstein, where we had an opportunity to hear all that was the greatest!

Zverev never limited himself to bringing us up as pianists. He did his best to generally give us a good all-round upbringing. He was deeply interested in the kind of reading we did.

Zverev required many things of each student, including mandatory opera attendances and chamber music rehearsals. Throughout the week, his students had to practice many hours, but on Sunday, they would relax, and he would host an open house. In the afternoon and evening, he would invite musical and intellectual figures from all over Moscow. His guests included Pyotr Ilyich Tchaikovsky, Alexander Taneyev, Anton Arensky, Anton Rubinstein, Vasily Safonov, Alexander Siloti, and other musicians, actors, lawyers, and professors. During these gatherings, he would allow no one to touch the piano, except to illustrate a point, because it was his students whom the gatherings were for.

=== Pupils ===
Zverev took only male students, and referred to them as "cubs" (Russian: зверята), (his own surname is derived from Russian зверь, meaning beast, or animal). The following were among his prominent students:

- Aleksandr Goldenweiser
- Sergei Rachmaninoff
- Alexander Scriabin
- Alexander Siloti

- Konstantin Igumnov (1873–1948) taught at the Moscow Conservatory, and gave lessons to Natalia Satina, who would become Rachmaninoff's wife.
- Fyodor Keneman (1873–1937) was a friend of Rachmaninoff.
- Leonid Maximov (1873–1904) died at age 31, terminating a successful career.
- Matvei Pressman (1870–1937) became Head of the Rostov Conservatory.
