= 2024 Men's U-18 EHF Championship I =

Tournament details
- Host country: Slovakia
- City: Humenné
- Venue: 1 (in 1 host city)
- Dates: 12–18 August 2024
- Teams: 8 (from 1 confederation)

Final positions
- Champions: Bosnia and Herzegovina
- Runners-up: Latvia
- Third place: Turkey
- Fourth place: Netherlands

Tournament statistics
- Matches played: 20
- Top scorers: (Turkey) Sadik Emre Herseklioglu (60 goals)

Awards
- Best player: (Bosnia and Herzegovina) Alem Hadžić

Official website
- Official website

The 2024 Men's U-18 EHF Championship I was held in Humenné, Slovakia from 12 to 18 August 2024. Bosnia and Herzegovina won the tournament by defeating Latvia in the final. The tournament featured 8 teams competing for the top spot with the finals seeing Bosnia and Herzegovina, Latvia and the Netherlands in the top spots.

== Teams ==
- Bosnia and Herzegovina
- Estonia
- Finland
- Latvia
- Lithuania
- Netherlands
- Slovakia
- Turkey

== Venue ==
The venue was the Mestska Sportova Hala in Humenné.

== Draw ==
The draw was held on 29 February 2024 in Vienna at 15:00 (CET).

Pot 1	Pot 2	Pot 3	Pot 4
Latvia; Bosnia and Herzegovina	Slovakia; Lithuania	Estonia; Netherlands	Turkey; Finland

== Referees ==
Referees
Bulgaria	Svetoslav Yovchev; Zvezdelin Yonchev
Cyprus	Charalambos Charalambous; Efstathiou Efstathios
Poland	Malgorzata Lidacka; Urszula Lesiak

Referees
Serbia	Stefan Berdic; Filip Šorak
Slovakia	Barbora Bocakova; Lucia Janosikova

== Preliminary round ==
=== Group A ===
Pos	Team	Pld	W	D	L	GF	GA	GD	Pts	Qualification
1	Bosnia and Herzegovina	3	3	0	0	109	81	+28	6	Semifinals
2	Turkey	3	2	0	1	105	100	+5	4	Semifinals
3	Lithuania	3	0	1	2	92	104	−12	1	5–8 classification bracket
4	Estonia	3	0	1	2	84	105	−21	1	5–8 classification bracket

Source: EHF
Rules for classification: 1) points; 2) head-to-head points; 3) head-to-head goal difference; 4) head-to-head number of goals scored; 5) goal difference.

12 August 2024; 12:15	Lithuania	34–43	Turkey	Mestska Sportova Hala, Humenné; Referees: Berdic, Šorak (SRB)
12 August 2024; 12:15	Labutis 9	(16–21)	Mete 11	Mestska Sportova Hala, Humenné; Referees: Berdic, Šorak (SRB)
12 August 2024; 12:15	1× (yellow card) 3× (suspension)	Report	11× (suspension)	Mestska Sportova Hala, Humenné; Referees: Berdic, Šorak (SRB)

12 August 2024; 14:30	Bosnia and Herzegovina	43–23	Estonia	Mestska Sportova Hala, Humenné; Referees: Lidacka, Lesiak (POL)
12 August 2024; 14:30	Hadzic, Hadzimuhamedovic 11	(20–8)	Heinla 7	Mestska Sportova Hala, Humenné; Referees: Lidacka, Lesiak (POL)
12 August 2024; 14:30	2× (suspension)	Report	4× (suspension)	Mestska Sportova Hala, Humenné; Referees: Lidacka, Lesiak (POL)

13 August 2024; 12:15	Estonia	33–34	Turkey	Mestska Sportova Hala, Humenné; Referees: Bocakova, Janosikova (SVK)
13 August 2024; 12:15	Heinla 8	(15–16)	Herseklioglu 13	Mestska Sportova Hala, Humenné; Referees: Bocakova, Janosikova (SVK)
13 August 2024; 12:15	2× (yellow card) 6× (suspension) 1× (red card)	Report	1× (yellow card) 8× (suspension) 1× (red card)	Mestska Sportova Hala, Humenné; Referees: Bocakova, Janosikova (SVK)

13 August 2024; 14:30	Bosnia and Herzegovina	33–30	Lithuania	Mestska Sportova Hala, Humenné; Referees: Yovchev, Yovchev (BUL)
13 August 2024; 14:30	Hadzimuhamedovic 11	(17–14)	Labutis 7	Mestska Sportova Hala, Humenné; Referees: Yovchev, Yovchev (BUL)
13 August 2024; 14:30	1× (yellow card) 5× (suspension)	Report	1× (yellow card) 3× (suspension)	Mestska Sportova Hala, Humenné; Referees: Yovchev, Yovchev (BUL)

15 August 2024; 16:45	Turkey	28–33	Bosnia and Herzegovina	Mestska Sportova Hala, Humenné; Referees: Berdic, Šorak (SRB)
15 August 2024; 16:45	Herseklioglu 12	(13–16)	Hadzic 10	Mestska Sportova Hala, Humenné; Referees: Berdic, Šorak (SRB)
15 August 2024; 16:45	1× (yellow card) 6× (suspension)	Report	1× (yellow card) 4× (suspension)	Mestska Sportova Hala, Humenné; Referees: Berdic, Šorak (SRB)

15 August 2024; 19:00	Lithuania	28–28	Estonia	Mestska Sportova Hala, Humenné; Referees: Bocakova, Janosikova (SVK)
15 August 2024; 19:00	Labutis 7	(14–13)	Liedemann 6	Mestska Sportova Hala, Humenné; Referees: Bocakova, Janosikova (SVK)
15 August 2024; 19:00	6× (suspension) 1× (red card)	Report	7× (suspension)	Mestska Sportova Hala, Humenné; Referees: Bocakova, Janosikova (SVK)

=== Group B ===
Pos	Team	Pld	W	D	L	GF	GA	GD	Pts	Qualification
1	Latvia	3	2	1	0	95	79	+16	5	Semifinals
2	Netherlands	3	2	0	1	96	80	+16	4	Semifinals
3	Slovakia (H)	3	1	1	1	91	87	+4	3	5–8 classification bracket
4	Finland	3	0	0	3	67	103	−36	0	5–8 classification bracket

Source: EHF
Rules for classification: 1) points; 2) head-to-head points; 3) head-to-head goal difference; 4) head-to-head number of goals scored; 5) goal difference.
(H) Hosts

12 August 2024; 16:45	Slovakia	32–23	Finland	Mestska Sportova Hala, Humenné; Referees: Yovchev, Yovchev (BUL)
12 August 2024; 16:45	Mišových 7	(19–12)	Malkamäki 4	Mestska Sportova Hala, Humenné; Referees: Yovchev, Yovchev (BUL)
12 August 2024; 16:45	1× (yellow card) 2× (suspension)	Report	3× (suspension)	Mestska Sportova Hala, Humenné; Referees: Yovchev, Yovchev (BUL)

12 August 2024; 19:00	Latvia	29–27	Netherlands	Mestska Sportova Hala, Humenné; Referees: Charalambous, Efstathiou (CYP)
12 August 2024; 19:00	Borisovs, Lilienfelds 8	(14–12)	Skwarczynski 5	Mestska Sportova Hala, Humenné; Referees: Charalambous, Efstathiou (CYP)
12 August 2024; 19:00	1× (yellow card) 4× (suspension)	Report	2× (suspension)	Mestska Sportova Hala, Humenné; Referees: Charalambous, Efstathiou (CYP)

13 August 2024; 16:45	Netherlands	34–21	Finland	Mestska Sportova Hala, Humenné; Referees: Berdic, Šorak (SRB)
13 August 2024; 16:45	Antonio 7	(14–7)	Sivén 5	Mestska Sportova Hala, Humenné; Referees: Berdic, Šorak (SRB)
13 August 2024; 16:45	6× (suspension)	Report		Mestska Sportova Hala, Humenné; Referees: Berdic, Šorak (SRB)

13 August 2024; 19:00	Latvia	29–29	Slovakia	Mestska Sportova Hala, Humenné; Referees: Lidacka, Lesiak (POL)
13 August 2024; 19:00	Lilienfelds 8	(15–15)	Krok 8	Mestska Sportova Hala, Humenné; Referees: Lidacka, Lesiak (POL)
13 August 2024; 19:00	1× (yellow card) 8× (suspension) 1× (red card)	Report	8× (suspension) 1× (red card)	Mestska Sportova Hala, Humenné; Referees: Lidacka, Lesiak (POL)

15 August 2024; 12:15	Finland	23–37	Latvia	Mestska Sportova Hala, Humenné; Referees: Charalambous, Efstathiou (CYP)
15 August 2024; 12:15	Hagman 6	(13–17)	Bors 10	Mestska Sportova Hala, Humenné; Referees: Charalambous, Efstathiou (CYP)
15 August 2024; 12:15	3× (suspension)	Report	4× (suspension)	Mestska Sportova Hala, Humenné; Referees: Charalambous, Efstathiou (CYP)

15 August 2024; 14:30	Slovakia	30–35	Netherlands	Mestska Sportova Hala, Humenné; Referees: Yonchev, Yonchev (BUL)
15 August 2024; 14:30	Gagyi 6	(21–18)	Luijten 9	Mestska Sportova Hala, Humenné; Referees: Yonchev, Yonchev (BUL)
15 August 2024; 14:30	1× (yellow card) 3× (suspension)	Report	4× (suspension)	Mestska Sportova Hala, Humenné; Referees: Yonchev, Yonchev (BUL)

== Knockout stage ==
=== 5–8 classification bracket ===
Semifinals
17 August
Lithuania	28
Finland	25
17 August
Slovakia	26
Estonia	29

5th place match
18 August
Lithuania	34
Estonia	30
7th place match
18 August
Finland	27
Slovakia	35

=== 5–8th place semifinals ===
17 August 2024; 12:15	Lithuania	28–25	Finland	Mestska Sportova Hala, Humenné; Referees: Bocakova, Janosikova (SVK)
17 August 2024; 12:15	Labutis 7	(13–13)	Ahlbäck 7	Mestska Sportova Hala, Humenné; Referees: Bocakova, Janosikova (SVK)
17 August 2024; 12:15	4× (suspension)	Report	3× (suspension)	Mestska Sportova Hala, Humenné; Referees: Bocakova, Janosikova (SVK)

17 August 2024; 14:30	Slovakia	26–29	Estonia	Mestska Sportova Hala, Humenné; Referees: Charalambous, Efstathiou (CYP)
17 August 2024; 14:30	Gagyi 6	(14–14)	Liedemann, Luks 6	Mestska Sportova Hala, Humenné; Referees: Charalambous, Efstathiou (CYP)
17 August 2024; 14:30	1× (yellow card) 4× (suspension) 1× (red card)	Report	7× (suspension)	Mestska Sportova Hala, Humenné; Referees: Charalambous, Efstathiou (CYP)

=== Seventh place game ===
18 August 2024; 14:00	Finland	27–35	Slovakia	Mestska Sportova Hala, Humenné; Referees: Berdic, Šorak (SRB)
18 August 2024; 14:00	Berglund 6	(9–17)	Valent 9	Mestska Sportova Hala, Humenné; Referees: Berdic, Šorak (SRB)
18 August 2024; 14:00	1× (yellow card) 3× (suspension)	Report	7× (suspension) 1× (red card)	Mestska Sportova Hala, Humenné; Referees: Berdic, Šorak (SRB)

=== Fifth place game ===
18 August 2024; 16:15	Lithuania	34–30	Estonia	Mestska Sportova Hala, Humenné; Referees: Charalambous, Efstathiou (CYP)
18 August 2024; 16:15	Budraitis 9	(14–15)	Liedemann 7	Mestska Sportova Hala, Humenné; Referees: Charalambous, Efstathiou (CYP)
18 August 2024; 16:15	1× (suspension)	Report	1× (yellow card) 6× (suspension)	Mestska Sportova Hala, Humenné; Referees: Charalambous, Efstathiou (CYP)

=== Knockout stage ===
Semi-finals
17 August
Bosnia and Herzegovina	29
Netherlands	25
17 August
Latvia	33
Turkey	28

Final
18 August
Bosnia and Herzegovina	38
Latvia	26
Third place
18 August
Netherlands	36
Turkey	38

=== Semifinals ===
17 August 2024; 16:45	Bosnia and Herzegovina	29–25	Netherlands	Mestska Sportova Hala, Humenné; Referees: Berdic, Šorak (SRB)
17 August 2024; 16:45	Hadzimuhamedovic 11	(16–13)	Van Vliet 6	Mestska Sportova Hala, Humenné; Referees: Berdic, Šorak (SRB)
17 August 2024; 16:45	2× (suspension)	Report	3× (suspension)	Mestska Sportova Hala, Humenné; Referees: Berdic, Šorak (SRB)

17 August 2024; 19:00	Latvia	33–28	Turkey	Mestska Sportova Hala, Humenné; Referees: Lidacka, Lesiak (POL)
17 August 2024; 19:00	Misulis 10	(15–15)	Herseklioglu 12	Mestska Sportova Hala, Humenné; Referees: Lidacka, Lesiak (POL)
17 August 2024; 19:00	3× (suspension)	Report	1× (yellow card) 7× (suspension) 1× (red card)	Mestska Sportova Hala, Humenné; Referees: Lidacka, Lesiak (POL)

=== Third place game ===
18 August 2024; 18:30	Netherlands	36–38	Turkey	Mestska Sportova Hala, Humenné; Referees: Yovchev, Yovchev (BUL)
18 August 2024; 18:30	Luijten 7	(15–19)	Herseklioglu 15	Mestska Sportova Hala, Humenné; Referees: Yovchev, Yovchev (BUL)
18 August 2024; 18:30	2× (suspension)	Report	1× (yellow card) 2× (suspension)	Mestska Sportova Hala, Humenné; Referees: Yovchev, Yovchev (BUL)

=== Final ===
18 August 2024; 20:45	Bosnia and Herzegovina	38–36	Latvia	Mestska Sportova Hala, Humenné; Referees: Lidacka, Lesiak (POL)
18 August 2024; 20:45	Hadzimuhamedovic 12	(16–10)	Misulis 6	Mestska Sportova Hala, Humenné; Referees: Lidacka, Lesiak (POL)
18 August 2024; 20:45	4× (suspension)	Report	1× (yellow card) 3× (suspension)	Mestska Sportova Hala, Humenné; Referees: Lidacka, Lesiak (POL)

== Final ranking ==
Rank	Team
1st place, gold medalist(s)	Bosnia and Herzegovina
2nd place, silver medalist(s)	Latvia
3rd place, bronze medalist(s)	Turkey
4	Netherlands
5	Lithuania
6	Estonia
7	Slovakia
8	Finland

== See also ==
- 2024 European Men's U-18 Handball Championship
- 2024 Men's U-18 EHF Championship II
- 2024 Men's U-20 EHF Championship
- 2024 European Men's U-20 Handball Championship
- 2025 IHF Men's U19 Handball World Championship
- 2025 IHF Men's U21 Handball World Championship
