= Ivaylo Sokolov =

Bulgarian footballer

Personal information
- Full name: Ivaylo Spirov Sokolov
- Date of birth: 15 September 1984 (age 42)
- Place of birth: Sofia, Bulgaria
- Height: 1.90 m (6 ft 3 in)
- Position: Defender

Youth career
- Lokomotiv Sofia

Senior career*
Years	Team	Apps	(Gls)
2004–2005	Lokomotiv Sofia	0	(0)
2005–2006	Rodopa Smolyan	0	(0)
2006–2008	Marek Dupnitsa	35	(0)
2008	Vihren Sandanski	0	(0)
2009	Birkirkara	12	(1)
2009–2010	Marek Dupnitsa	16	(2)
2010–2011	Floriana	7	(0)
2012	Nesebar	12	(1)
2012–2014	Chepinets Velingrad	?	(?)
2014–2015	Akademik Svishtov	?	(?)
- * Club domestic league appearances and goals

Ivaylo Sokolov (Bulgarian: Ивайло Соколов; born 15 September 1984) is a Bulgarian former professional footballer who played as a defender.

== Career ==
In December 2008, he was loaned by his club, Vihren Sandanski, to Maltese side Birkirkara until the end of the season.
