= Todor Vladimirov =

Bulgarian footballer

Personal information
- Date of birth: 21 May 1895
- Place of birth: Sofia, Bulgaria
- Date of death: 23 January 1978 (aged 82)
- Place of death: Sofia, Bulgaria

International career
Years	Team	Apps	(Gls)
- Bulgaria

Todor Vladimirov (Bulgarian: Тодор Владимиров, 21 May 1895 – 23 January 1978) was a Bulgarian footballer. He competed in the men's tournament at the 1924 Summer Olympics.
