= Milen Tanev =

Bulgarian footballer

Personal information
- Full name: Milen Kirchev Tanev
- Date of birth: 4 March 1987 (age 39)
- Place of birth: Stara Zagora, Bulgaria
- Height: 1.70 m (5 ft 7 in)
- Position: Midfielder

Team information
- Current team: Sayana Haskovo

Youth career
- Beroe Stara Zagora

Senior career*
| Years | Team | Apps | (Gls) |
| 2006–2012 | Beroe Stara Zagora | 67 | (4) |
| 2008–2010 | → Chernomorets Balchik (loan) | 13 | (2) |
| 2010 | → Chernomorets Balchik (loan) | 15 | (0) |
| 2012–2013 | Caspiy | 22 | (3) |
| 2013 | Botev Galabovo | 3 | (0) |
| 2014 | Master Burgas | 15 | (7) |
| 2014–2015 | Chernomorets Burgas | 26 | (2) |
| 2015–2017 | Pomorie | 53 | (4) |
| 2017–2018 | Vereya | 28 | (0) |
| 2019 | Pomorie | 30 | (5) |
| 2020–2023 | Chernomorets Burgas | 63 | (27) |
| 2023– | Sayana Haskovo | | |
- * Club domestic league appearances and goals as of 15 December 2019

Milen Tanev (Bulgarian: Милен Танев; born 4 March 1987) is a Bulgarian footballer currently playing as a midfielder for Sayana Haskovo.

== Career ==
Tanev played for Pomorie in the Second League for two seasons but left the club in June 2017 when he signed with Vereya. He then played for Pomorie again in 2019, before returning to Chernomorets Burgas in 2020.

== Honours ==
=== Club ===
- Beroe
  - Bulgarian Cup: 2009-10
