= Georgi Petkov (footballer, born 1988) =

Bulgarian footballer (born 1988)

Personal information
- Full name: Georgi Dimitrov Petkov
- Date of birth: 30 July 1988 (age 38)
- Place of birth: Burgas, Bulgaria
- Height: 1.80 m (5 ft 11 in)
- Position: Defender

Team information
- Current team: Pomorie
- Number: 5

Senior career*
Years	Team	Apps	(Gls)
2006–2009	Sliven 2000	26	(1)
2009–2010	Chernomorets Pomorie	7	(1)
2010	Sliven 2000	1	(0)
2010–2011	Caravaca CF	29	(4)
2011–2012	CF La Unión	33	(2)
2012–2013	Master Burgas	?	(?)
2014	Neftochimic Burgas	14	(1)
2014–	Pomorie	137	(13)
- * Club domestic league appearances and goals as of 15 December 2019

Georgi Petkov (Bulgarian: Георги Петков; born 30 July 1988) is a Bulgarian footballer who plays as a defender for Bulgarian Second League club OFC Pomorie, for whom he is captain.
