= Milen Bonev =

Bulgarian football player

Personal information
- Full name: Milen Hristov Bonev
- Date of birth: 1 July 1986 (age 40)
- Place of birth: Tryavna, Bulgaria
- Height: 1.70 m (5 ft 7 in)
- Position: Midfielder

Team information
- Current team: Kaliakra Kavarna
- Number: 30

Senior career*
Years	Team	Apps	(Gls)
2005–2008	Valeks Tryavna		
2008–	Kaliakra Kavarna	108	(4)
- * Club domestic league appearances and goals as of 23 May 2014

Milen Bonev (Bulgarian: Милен Бонев; born 1 July 1986 in Tryavna) is a Bulgarian football player. He played Kaliakra Kavarna as a midfielder.
