= Georgi Kichukov =

Bulgarian footballer

Personal information
- Full name: Georgi Todorov Kichukov
- Date of birth: 8 March 1976 (age 50)
- Place of birth: Panagyurishte, Bulgaria
- Height: 1.80 m (5 ft 11 in)
- Position: Midfielder

Senior career*
Years	Team	Apps	(Gls)
1996–1998	Botev Vratsa	35	(9)
1998–1999	Yantra Gabrovo	27	(6)
1999–2000	Etar Veliko Tarnovo	40	(12)
2001–2002	Botev Vratsa	35	(14)
2002–2007	Dobrudzha Dobrich	121	(25)
2007–2008	Svetkavitsa	32	(7)
2009–2014	Kaliakra Kavarna	105	(8)
Total		395	(81)

International career
1996–1997	Bulgaria U-21	8	(1)
- * Club domestic league appearances and goals

Georgi Kichukov (Bulgarian: Георги Кичуков; born 8 March 1976) is a retired Bulgarian footballer, who played as a midfielder. In 2010, he played for Kaliakra Kavarna.
