= Nikolay Nikolov (footballer, born 1985) =

Bulgarian footballer

Personal information
- Full name: Nikolay Hristov Nikolov
- Date of birth: 21 May 1985 (age 41)
- Place of birth: Bulgaria
- Height: 1.77 m (5 ft 9 1/2 in)
- Position: Midfielder

Senior career*
Years	Team	Apps	(Gls)
2003–2004	CSKA Sofia	1	(0)
2004–2011	Chavdar Etropole	151	(19)
2011–2013	Botev Vratsa	51	(1)
- * Club domestic league appearances and goals as of 14 November 2013

Nikolay Nikolov (Bulgarian: Николай Николов; born 21 May 1985) is a Bulgarian footballer, who plays as a midfielder for Kariana Erden.

== Career statistics ==
As of 5 June 2012

Club	Season	League		Cup		Europe		Total	
Club	Season	Apps	Goals	Apps	Goals	Apps	Goals	Apps	Goals
CSKA Sofia	2003–04	1	0	0	0	0	0	1	0
Chavdar Etropole	2004–05	13	0	0	0	–	–	13	0
Chavdar Etropole	2005–06	23	2	0	0	–	–	23	2
Chavdar Etropole	2006–07	28	6	0	0	–	–	28	6
Chavdar Etropole	2007–08	22	2	2	1	–	–	24	3
Chavdar Etropole	2008–09	27	2	2	0	–	–	29	2
Chavdar Etropole	2009–10	25	4	4	0	–	–	29	4
Chavdar Etropole	2010–11	13	3	1	0	–	–	14	3
Botev Vratsa	2010–11	15	0	0	0	–	–	15	0
Botev Vratsa	2011–12	17	0	0	0	–	–	17	0
Career totals		184	19	9	1	0	0	193	20
