= Capriccio =

Capriccio may refer to:

== Music ==
- Capriccio (music), a piece of music which is fairly free in form
- Fantasia in C major (Haydn), "Capriccio", a 1789 piano composition by Joseph Haydn
- Capriccio (Janáček), a chamber music composition by Leoš Janáček
- Capriccio for Piano and Orchestra, a 1929 composition for piano and orchestra by Stravinsky
- Capriccio (opera), a 1942 opera by Richard Strauss
- Capriccio (record label), an Austrian classical music record label
- Capriccio, a composition adapted by Imogen Holst from a jazz-band piece by Gustav Holst.

== Films ==
- Capriccio (1938 film), a German historical comedy
- Capriccio (1972 film), by Carmelo Bene
- Capriccio (1987 film), by Tinto Brass

== Other uses ==
- Capriccio (art), in painting an architectural fantasy
- Capriccio (Rex Whistler), a 1936-1938 mural by Rex Whistler at Plas Newydd, Anglesey
- Capriccio, 1990 collection of poems by Ted Hughes
- Capriccio, 2003 manga series volume, see list of One Piece chapters (187–388)

== See also ==
- El Capricho, a building in Comillas, designed by Antoni Gaudí
