= Svetoslav Valeriev =

Bulgarian footballer

Personal information
- Full name: Svetoslav Valeriev Angelov
- Date of birth: 3 March 1988 (age 38)
- Place of birth: Bulgaria
- Height: 1.77 m (5 ft 9 1/2 in)
- Position: Midfielder

Team information
- Current team: Lokomotiv Mezdra
- Number: 19

Senior career*
Years	Team	Apps	(Gls)
2007–2008	Lokomotiv Mezdra	7	(0)
2008–2014	Botev Vratsa	134	(9)
2017–2018	Miziya Knezha		
2018	Bdin Vidin		(6)
2019	Parva Atomna		(0)
2019–	Lokomotiv Mezdra	0	(0)
- * Club domestic league appearances and goals as of 8 December 2014

Svetoslav Valeriev (Bulgarian: Светослав Валериев; born 3 March 1988) is a Bulgarian football midfielder who plays for Lokomotiv Mezdra.
