= Kavarna Stadium =

Sports venue in Bulgaria

- Interactive map of Kavarna Stadium
- Full name: Kavarna Stadium
- Location: Kavarna, Bulgaria
- Coordinates: 43°25′42″N 28°19′52″E
- Owner: Municipality of Kavarna
- Operator: PFC Kaliakra Kavarna
- Capacity: 5,000
- Surface: Grass
- Field size: 103 x 68

Construction
- Groundbreaking: 1967
- Built: 1967 - 1968
- Opened: 1968
- Renovated: 2008
- Expanded: 2008

Tenants
- Kaliakra Kavarna (1967-present); Kavarna Rock Fest (2006-2016); Cherno More Varna (2016-2017); Fratria (2024-present)

Kavarna Stadium (Bulgarian: Стадион "Каварна") is a multi-purpose stadium in Kavarna, Bulgaria. It is located in the south part of the city. Currently, the venue is used mostly for football matches and is the home ground of former Bulgarian A PFG football club, Kaliakra Kavarna. The stadium has an overall capacity of 5,000 spectators and was built in 1967.

- The stadium is situated in the Kaliakra Sport Complex, which was constructed along with the renovation of the stadium in 2008. The sports complex also includes two football training pitches and one authority building, used by the management of the local football club.
- In 2008, with the help of the mayor Tsonko Tsonev, the stadium underwent a total renovation. New stands were constructed and the capacity of the stadium was expanded to 5,000 spectators. In the same year, a floodlight system of 1200 lx and a new scoreboard were installed. The grass surface was replaced and new sprinkler and drainage systems were also installed.
- The stadium is also used as a ground for numerous rock concerts and the traditional Kavarna Rock Fest, which was held every year, from 2004 to 2016. Notable artists that have performed at the stadium include Manowar, Deep Purple, Black Sabbath, Scorpions and Robert Plant & The Strange Sensation, among others.
- The record attendance of the stadium is 4,540 spectators, which was achieved at the game between Kaliakra Kavarna and Cherno More Varna on April 16, 2008 in the semi-final match of the Bulgarian Cup.
- Due to the modern infrastructure of the stadium, and the presence of floodlights, clubs other than Kaliakra have also used the stadium for limited time periods, including Ludogorets Razgrad and Cherno More Varna.
