= FC Etropole =

Bulgarian football club

Etropole
- Full name: Football Club Etropole
- Founded: 1922; 104 years ago
- Ground: Chavdar Stadium
- Capacity: 5,600
- League: Third League
- 2025–26: A RFG Sofia, 1st (promoted)
Home colours	Away colours

FC Etropole (Bulgarian: ФК Етрополе) is a Bulgarian football club based in Etropole, Sofia Province. Founded in 1922, they competes in the Third League, the third level of Bulgarian football league system. They play their home games at the Chavdar Stadium, which now boasts a capacity of 5,600. Their home colours are red and white.

Chavdar have spent the majority of their playing history between the third and fourth tiers of the Bulgarian football league system. They achieved promotion to the second tier in 2007 following a win against Botev Vratsa in the play-off. The following season, they achieved their highest league finish in club history, ending the season 3rd in the Bulgarian Second Division.

In 2009–10 season, as a second league team, Chavdar contested the Bulgarian Cup Semi-final for the only time in their history, losing 1–0 against Beroe.

== History ==
Crest used from 1990 until 2024.

The club was established in 1922 with the name "Balkan". In 1945 the club was renamed "Peyo Krinchev". Between 1957 and 1985 the club was named DFS "Etropole". Since 1985 the name is "Chavdar". The main kit-colours of the team are red and white. In his history the club participated in either the second or the third Bulgarian division. Currently the team is playing in the West B PFG. In 2007/2008 season Chavdar finishes 3rd in the Bulgarian South-West V AFG, and wins promotion for the 2008/2009 season.

The club qualified for the 1/16 finals of the Bulgarian Cup 1972–73 after defeating Botev Vratsa and for the 1/8 finals in 2007–08 after defeating PFC Haskovo and beating surprisingly elite Marek Dupnitsa with 5:3 (after penalty kicks) to make it to the 1/8 finals of the competition. There "Chavdar" was eliminated by the Kaliakra Kavarna after suffering a 2:0 loss. On 31 March 2010, Chavdar reached the semi-finals of the Bulgarian Cup for the first time in their history - the team from Etropole eliminated higher echelon Slavia Sofia after a penalty shootout (the score at the end of extra time was 0:0, the hosts won 4:2 in the kicks from the spot contest). They lost in the next round against Beroe by a score of 0:1.

The team was dissolved in 2013, but restored again in the year 2014, starting from A Regional Group, the 4th league in Bulgarian football. He quickly returned to Third league, but in December 2023 the team once again was dissolved. It was restored in the summer of 2024, starting from A Regional, under the name FC Etropole. On 11 June 2026 they won the promotion playoff against Nadezhda Dobroslavtsi and returned to Third League.

== Honours ==
- Third place in the Western "B" group: 2007/08
- Semifinalist in the National Cup tournament: this time its official name is the Cup of Bulgaria - 2009 / 10

== Notable players ==
Had international caps for their respective countries, held any club record, or had more than 100 league appearances. Players whose name is listed in bold represented their countries.

Bulgaria

- (Bulgaria) **Ivaylo Chochev**
- (Bulgaria) **Anton Nedyalkov**
- (Bulgaria) Nikolay Nikolov

- (Bulgaria) **Georgi Pashov**
- (Bulgaria) **Dimitar Pirgov**
- (Bulgaria) **Simeon Slavchev**
- (Bulgaria) **Aleksandar Vasilev**

== Seasons ==
=== Past seasons ===
Season	League	Place	W	D	L	GF	GA	Pts	Bulgarian Cup
2014–15	A RFG (IV)	1st	14	2	2	64	14	44	not qualified
2015–16	A RFG	2nd	16	2	2	96	18	50	not qualified
2016–17	Third League (III)	7th	17	2	15	60	46	53	not qualified
2017–18	Third League	6th	14	10	10	63	49	52	not qualified
2018–19	Third League	12th	11	7	16	54	47	40	not qualified
**Green marks a season followed by promotion, red a season followed by relegation.**

== Managers ==
Name	Period
(Bulgaria) Stoycho Stoev	July 2007 – July 2009
(Bulgaria) Boris Angelov	July 2009 – June 2010
(Bulgaria) Atanas Atanasov	June 2010 – December 2011
(Bulgaria) Petar Penchev	December 2011 – June 2013
(Bulgaria) Krasimir Stoev	June 2014 –
