= Kaloyanovo =

Kaloyanovo (Bulgarian: Калояново) may refer to:

- Kaloyanovo Municipality - a municipality in Plovdiv Province, Bulgaria
- Kaloyanovo, Plovdiv Province - a village in Kaloyanovo Municipality, Plovdiv Province, Bulgaria
- Kaloyanovo, Sliven Province - a village in Sliven Municipality, Sliven Province, Bulgaria
