= Kaloyan Kopchev =

Bulgarian footballer

Personal information
- Date of birth: 22 June 1975 (age 51)
- Place of birth: Ruse, Bulgaria
- Position: Midfielder

Kaloyan Kopchev (Bulgarian: Калоян Копчев; born 22 June 1975) is a former Bulgarian football midfielder who is currently the director of the Health Insurance Fund in Ruse.

== Biography ==
In the 1990s and early 2000s, Kopchev played for Dunav Ruse. In 1999, he earned a Master's in "Marketing and Planning" from the Tsenov Academy of Economics.
