= Ivan Raychev =

Bulgarian footballer

Personal information
- Full name: Ivan Raychev Ivanov
- Date of birth: 28 February 1977 (age 49)
- Place of birth: Kavarna, Bulgaria
- Height: 1.83 m (6 ft 0 in)
- Positions: Centre-back; right-back

Senior career*
Years	Team	Apps	(Gls)
1994–1998	Cherno More	59	(1)
1998–1999	Antibiotik-Ludogorets	27	(0)
1999–2000	Litex Lovech	2	(0)
2000–2007	Vidima-Rakovski	114	(5)
2007–2014	Kaliakra Kavarna	147	(15)
Total		349	(21)

International career
1998–1999	Bulgaria U21	6	(0)
1999	Bulgaria U23	1	(0)

Managerial career
- 2014–2016: Kaliakra Kavarna
- 2025–2026: Aksakovo
- * Club domestic league appearances and goals

Ivan Raychev (Bulgarian: Иван Райчев; born 28 February 1977) is a Bulgarian former professional footballer who played as a centre-back or right-back.

== Career ==
In 2014, after retirement, he become the manager of Kaliakra Kavarna. He left the post on 26 May 2016. On 17 February 2025 he become a manager of Aksakovo.
