= OFC Pomorie =

Bulgarian football club

- Full name: Municipal Football Club Pomorie
- Nickname: The Pomorians
- Founded: 1934; 92 years ago
- Ground: Stadion Pomorie, Pomorie
- Capacity: 2,000
- Owner: Pomorie Municipality
- Chairman: Hristo Burgazliev
- Head coach: Malin Orachev
- League: A RFG Burgas
- 2023–24: A RFG Burgas, 3rd
- Website: http://www.ofc.pomorie.bg/
Home colours	Away colours

Pomorie (Bulgarian: Поморие) is a Bulgarian municipal (Bulgarian: общински, pronounced obshtinski) association football club based in Pomorie, that competes in the A RFG Burgas, the fourth tier of Bulgarian football. The club plays its home matches at the Pomorie Stadium, which has an overall capacity of 2,000 seats.

== Honours ==
Second League:

- Runners-up (2): 2010-11, 2015-16

Third League:

- Winners (1): 2002/03

Bulgarian Cup

- Runners-up (1): 2010

Cup of Bulgarian Amateur Football League

- Winners (2): 2002/03, 2008/09

== History ==
=== First years ===
The football club in Pomorie was established in 1934. In 1944 became Nikolay Luskov in honour of the famous Bulgarian communist politic with the same name, who died in the town. Since then, the club changed its name twice, as Cherveno Zname and FC Pomorie, without making some important achievements.

=== 2002–2009 ===
However, in 2002, the club managed to earn a promotion to the Bulgarian V AFG. The next season, the club was bought by the Bulgarian oil company Petrol AD, and the same 2003–04 season the team achieved a double by winning the South-East V AFG and the Bulgarian Amateur Cup, again under the name FC Pomorie.

The following two seasons Pomorie competed in the Bulgarian B PFG, but in 2006, were once again relegated to the V AFG. In the next years, the club stayed in the South-East V AFG, without achieving any significant results. In 2009, however, PFC Pomorie finished in the third position of their division and were able to play a play-off match for a promotion to the Bulgarian B PFG.

=== Union with Naftex Burgas ===
On July 3, 2009, PFC Pomorie merged with Naftex Burgas from the nearby city Burgas, by demands from the Petrol AD owner Mitko Sabev. However, the old club was folded and a new club was established by the fans as a successor of the old team. Therefore, only part of the Naftex players were moved to the Pomorie team. The newly created club was named Chernomorets Pomorie and several days later the club obtained a license from the BFU in order to participate in the East B PFG. As of 2009 Chernomorets Pomorie is used as a satellite team for Chernomorets Burgas and has a goal to train and develop players, seeking promotion to the first squad in the main club. At the end of the 2010/2011 B PFG season, Chernomorets Pomorie finished in 2nd place, securing the right to challenge Vidima Rakovski for a spot in the A PFG, the top echelon in Bulgaria. However, they were ultimately denied a professional license by the Bulgarian Football Union and FC Sportist Svoge will face the team from Sevlievo. Since season 2014/2015 OFC Pomorie has participated in the South-Eastern 3rd football division.

=== Final of Bulgarian Cup ===
On April 28, 2010, Chernomorets Pomorie surprisingly managed to secure a place in the final of the Bulgarian Cup after securing some prestigious wins against Minyor Pernik (2:0) and Kaliakra Kavarna (4:1 after penalties) at the Pomorie Stadium. Chernomorets's players are the second ones from a B PFG team in the Bulgarian Cup history, that have reached the final of the competition since Chernomorets Burgas's similar achievement in 1989. The final of the cup was held on May 5, 2010, against Beroe Stara Zagora at the Lovech Stadium, but it was lost by the Pomorie with 0:1.

=== Difficult Years ===
On 23 May 2012 was the last game of team. In June 2012 Chernomorets Pomorie and Akademik Sofia did not receive a professional license from the BFU and were relegated to the third division. The team denied to compete in V Grupa and any other division due to financial problems. On 15 September 2012 its changes the name to OFC Pomorie. The youth academy of the club currently competes in youth divisions.

=== New beginning ===
On 22 July 2013 the main team made its first training and during 2013–14 season competed in the regional divisions. The team quickly progressed, winning the Third League in the season 2014–15, thus promoting to the second division, where they currently play.

Pomorie was disqualified from the second level after the 2019–20 season due to financial problems. The club did not apply for entry to the Third League due to continuing financial trouble.

=== Historical names ===
Years	Names
1944-80	FC Nikolay Luskov
1980-95	FC Cherno More
1995-09	PFC Pomorie
2009-12	PFC Chernomorets
2012–present	OFC Pomorie

== Past seasons ==
Season	League	Place	W	D	L	GF	GA	Pts	Bulgarian Cup
2013–14	A RFG (IV)	2	23	1	4	91	27	70	not qualified
2014–15	V Group (III)	1	23	4	3	66	16	73	not qualified
2015–16	B Group (II)	2	15	9	6	36	23	54	First round
2016–17	Second League	7	14	5	11	36	32	47	Second round
2017–18	Second League	6	10	11	9	36	32	41	First round
Green marks a season followed by promotion, red a season followed by relegation.

== Stadium and Sports Complex ==
Chernomorets Pomorie currently play their home matches at the Pomorie Stadium in Pomorie. The stadium has an overall capacity of 3,000 spectators and it is part of a major training sports complex located in the range of a 5-star luxury hotel complex, which is also used by the needs of the football club. The venue has one main stand with roof covers, a 1400 lux floodlight system, a frame scoreboard and a synthetic grass pitch surface. It was built in 2006, along with the Pomorie Sports Complex at a total cost of € 3,25 million.

== Players ==
=== Current squad ===
As of 20 August 2019 Note: Flags indicate national team as defined under FIFA eligibility rules; some limited exceptions apply. Players may hold more than one non-FIFA nationality.

No.	Pos.	Nation	Player
1	GK	BUL	Martin Sheytanov
2	DF	BUL	Anton Ivanov
3	DF	BUL	Todor Petkov
4	DF	BUL	Stoyan Kizhev
5	DF	BUL	Georgi Petkov (captain)
6	DF	BUL	Ivan Yanchev
7	MF	BUL	Dimitar Zakonov
8	MF	BUL	Hristiyan Kazakov
9	FW	BUL	Aleko Hristov
10	MF	BUL	Bekir Rasim
11	MF	BUL	Zhivko Iliev
12	GK	BUL	Dimitar Todorov

No.	Pos.	Nation	Player
13	DF	BUL	Miroslav Koev
14	MF	BUL	Zhivko Zhekov
16	MF	FRA	Wilfried Grimaud
17	MF	BUL	Georgi Chukalov
19	MF	BUL	Yakub Idrizov
20	MF	BUL	Rumen Kasabov
21	MF	BUL	Hristo Lemperov
22	MF	BUL	Kaloyan Stoyandzhov
23	DF	BUL	Zhivko Hadzhiev
24	MF	FRA	Josué Ntoya
25	MF	BUL	Milen Tanev
27	FW	BUL	Tihomir Kanev

For recent transfers, see Transfers summer 2019.

=== Foreign players ===
Only one non-EU national can be registered and given a squad number for the first team in the Bulgarian Second League. Those non-EU nationals with European ancestry can claim citizenship from the nation their ancestors came from. If a player does not have European ancestry, he can claim Bulgarian citizenship after playing in Bulgaria for 5 years.

EU Nationals

- (France) Wilfried Grimaud
- (France) Josué Ntoya

EU Nationals (Dual citizenship)

Non-EU Nationals

=== Staff ===
Position	Name
Chairman	(Bulgaria) Hristo Burgazliev
Managing director	(Bulgaria) Ognyan Ralev
Sport-technical director	(Bulgaria) Stoyan Dzhisov
Coach	(Bulgaria) Lazar Tonozliev
Coach	(Bulgaria) Lachezar Danev
Coach	(Bulgaria) Boris Tomov
