= FC Kaliakra Kavarna =

Bulgarian football club

Kaliakra
- Full name: Футболен клуб Калиакра Каварна (Football club Kaliakra Kavarna)
- Nickname: Каляри (Cagliari)
- Founded: 1922; 104 years ago
- Ground: Kavarna Stadium, Kavarna
- Capacity: 5,000
- Director: Dimo Yordanov
- Manager: Dimcho Filev
- League: OG Dobrich
- 2024-25: Unknown
- Website: www.fckaliakra.com
Home colours	Away colours

FC Kaliakra Kavarna (Bulgarian: ФК Калиакра Каварна) is a Bulgarian football club from the town of Kavarna, which currently competes in the A RFG Dobrich, the fourth tier of Bulgarian football.

Founded in 1922 as Kaliakra Sport Club, the club spent most of its history in amateur football before making a rapid ascent to the second-flight of Bulgarian football in 1980. In 2010, the team managed to promote to the A Group for the first time. Their spell in the top flight lasted two seasons, ending in relegation in 2012.

Kaliakra Kavarna's name is derived from the Kaliakra cape, which is located nearby the town. The team plays in all-blue home kits, in reference to the geographic proximity of the city of Kavarna and the Black Sea, similarly to other teams from the area. The lighthouse of Kavarna is also shown on the team logo.

=== Kits ===
Currently the team's home kit is blue and away kit is white. A various combinations of blue and white can be seen through the years. But blue remains the basic colour of the team.

== History ==
Kaliakra was established in 1922, and has had its current name since 1957. The official colors were initially chosen as blue and white. During its history the club has also been named Venus Venera, Bizone, SC Dobrotich, SC Spartak and Cherveno zname.

The club spent most of its history in amateur football before winning promotion for the second-flight of Bulgarian football in 1980. In the first campaign in B PFG, Kaliakra survived relegation back to third division at the end of 1980–81, but with only point more than rivals Chernolomets Popovo. The next season meant a 14th place for the team, but in 1982-83 Kaliakra won just eleven games during the entire campaign and were relegated. The team spent the next 22 years in third division, before being promoted for the second time to B PFG during the 2004–05 season. They finished their first campaign in the 2005/06 B PFG in 10th place.

In 2007–08 season Kaliakra had their best Bulgarian Cup run ever, beating Chavdar Etropole and elite Lokomotiv Plovdiv before losing to Cherno More Varna on penalties in the semi-finals. The season in the domestic league was also successful for the team, after they finished 2nd, and qualified for the play-off for promotion in the top division. But on May 24, 2008, Kaliakra lost against Minyor Pernik with a result of 6:7 (after penalties) in the play-off.

In 2009–10 Kaliakra reached the Bulgarian Cup semi-finals for second time in the club's history, but lost 3–0 after penalties (1–1 in regular time) to Chernomorets Pomorie at Pomorie Stadium. A month later they won a first promotion to the A PFG by winning the Eastern B PFG.

The 2010-11 season was historic for Kaliakra, as it was their first ever season in the Bulgarian elite. The team began the campaign under the management of Filip Filipov, starting strong, with an away 0–1 win against Slavia Sofia. However, Kaliakra then dropped their form and at the end of round 12, the team was in 13th position. Filipov was sacked and replaced by Antoni Zdravkov on 7 October. Under Zdravkov, Kavarna improved somewhat, although the team was still in danger of relegation up until round 25. Good results in the last couple of rounds improved their position on the table, eventually leading Kaliakra to a 12th-place finish, thus avoiding relegation. The team ended the season with eight wins, six draws, as well as 16 losses, earning them 30 points.

For the 2011-12 season, which would be Kaliakra's second season in the elite, Zdravkov's contract was not renewed, so he was replaced by Adalbert Zafirov, prior to the start of the season. The 2011–12 season proved to be much more difficult for Kaliakra, as the team spent the majority of the season in the relegation zone. Zafirov was sacked on 19 October, being replaced by Radostin Trifonov. This did not improve the team's results, as the team remained in 15th position until the end of the season, thus were relegated. Kaliakra ended the season with only 11 points, with only FC Svetkavitsa Targovishte having less points (only 8). Kavarna only won two games, against Beroe Stara Zagora and PFC Vidima-Rakovski Sevlievo, both of which were home wins. Away results were horrible, with the team earning only one point from away games, a 1–1 draw against Minyor Pernik.

Kaliakra was relegated to the B PFG after two years in the top division. After two more years in B PFG Kaliakra was relegated back to the amateur divisions, ending nearly a decade of professional football.

In 2018, amid the serious financial problems of the club, a new club from Kavarna was founded, called FC Kaliakra 1, which enrolled in A RFG Dobrich, the regional fourth tier for clubs based in Dobrich region. In 2020, the original Kaliakra Kavarna was relegated from the Third League and subsequently dissolved due to insolvency. This resulted in Kaliakra 1 becoming the main club from the city. Kaliakra 1 is consented generally to be the legitimate successor of the original club. The club was subsequently renamed to Kaliakra 1923 and began playing in the fourth tier of Bulgarian football.

== Notable players ==
Had international caps for their respective countries, held any club record, or had more than 100 league appearances. Players whose name is listed in bold represented their countries.

Bulgaria

- (Bulgaria) **Lachezar Baltanov**
- (Bulgaria) Milen Bonev
- (Bulgaria) Anton Dimitrov
- (Bulgaria) Detelin Dimitrov
- (Bulgaria) **Yordan Gospodinov**
- (Bulgaria) Georgi Kichukov
- (Bulgaria) Ivan Petkov
- (Bulgaria) **Svetoslav Petrov**
- (Bulgaria) Ivan Raychev
- (Bulgaria) Chetin Sadula
- (Bulgaria) Georgi Stanchev
- (Bulgaria) **Aleksandar Vasilev**
- (Bulgaria) Dzhuneyt Yashar
- (Bulgaria) **Vladimir Yonkov**

Asia

- (Uzbekistan) **Georgi Georgiev**

== Honours ==
=== Domestic ===
Bulgarian A PFG:

- 12th place: 2010–11

Bulgarian B Group

- Winners (1): 2009–10
- Runners-up (1): 2007-08

Bulgarian Cup:

- Semi-finals (2): 2007-08, 2009-10

== Stadium ==
PFC Kaliakra currently plays its home matches at the Kavarna Stadium. The club's home stadium was built in 1967. It is situated in the Kaliakra Sport Complex, in the south side of Kavarna. Years later, the ground underwent a total reconstruction in 2007 and was brought to a suitable stand in 2008. It has approximately 5,000 seats with pitch dimensions of 103 x 68 metres. In 2008, the stadium was also equipped with electric lighting of 1200 lx. The record attendance of the stadium is 4,540 spectators and it was achieved at the game against Cherno More Varna on April 16, 2008, in the semi-final of the Bulgarian Cup.

== Managers ==
- (Bulgaria) Filip Filipov (July 2010–Oct 10)
- (Bulgaria) Antoni Zdravkov (Oct 2010–May 11)
- (Bulgaria) Radostin Trifonov (2011)
- (Bulgaria) Adalbert Zafirov (2011)
- (Bulgaria) Radostin Trifonov (2011–12)
- (Bulgaria) Vachko Vachev (March 2012–)
