= Stadion Pomorie =

Sports venue in Pomorie, Bulgaria

Coordinates: 42°33′58″N 27°38′12″E

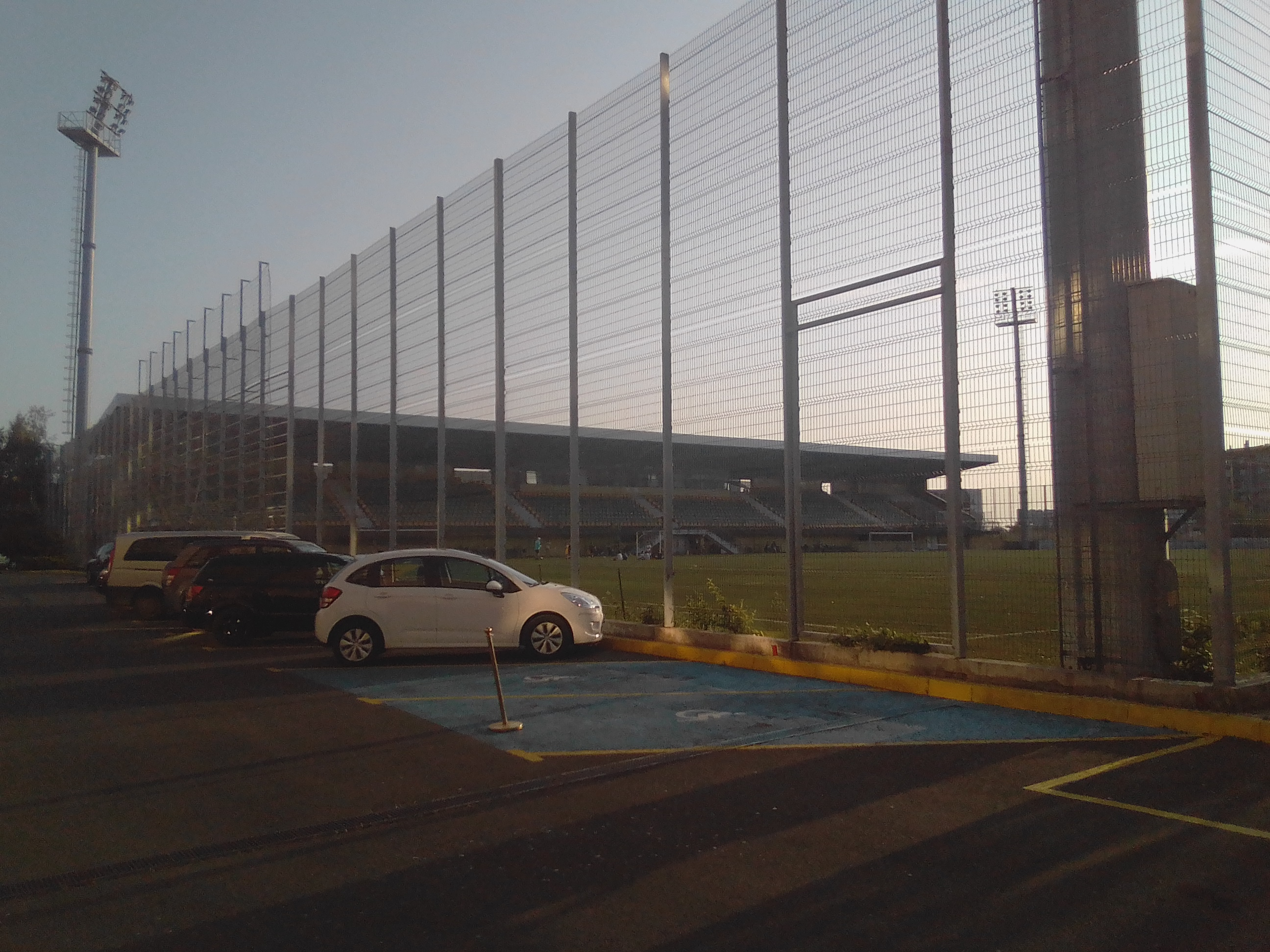
- Interactive map of Stadion Pomorie
- Full name: Pomorie Stadium
- Location: Pomorie, Bulgaria
- Owner: Petrol AD
- Capacity: 2,000
- Surface: Synthetic grass
- Field size: 105 × 68

Construction
- Groundbreaking: May 2005
- Built: 2005–2006
- Opened: November 2006
- Renovated: 2017
- Cost: €3,25 million
- Architect: Kamen Shipkov

Tenants
- Pomorie (2006–); Master Burgas (2013–2014)

Stadion Pomorie (Bulgarian: Стадион „Поморие“, English: 'Pomorie Stadium') is a multi-purpose stadium in Pomorie, Bulgaria. It is currently used for football matches and is the home ground of OFC Pomorie. The stadium currently holds 2,000 spectators.

- The stadium is part of the Pomorie Sports Complex, which is located in the range of a five-star luxurious hotel complex. The sports complex also includes two training football grounds, an indoor fitness hall and an administration building, which is used by the coaching staff and the management of the sports club.
- The stadium has one main stand with roof covers. The venue is also equipped with an electronic scoreboard and a floodlight system with a density of 1400 lux.
- Also, the construction of the stadium started in May 2005 and was completed in November 2006, along with the Pomorie Sports Complex at a total cost of €3.25 million.
