= Kaloyan Stoyanov =

Bulgarian footballer

Personal information
- Full name: Kaloyan Valeriev Stoyanov
- Date of birth: 2 November 1986 (age 40)
- Place of birth: Blagoevgrad, Bulgaria
- Height: 1.86 m (6 ft 1 in)
- Position: Forward

Senior career*
Years	Team	Apps	(Gls)
2006–2011	Pirin Blagoevgrad	45	(4)
2011–2012	Septemvri Simitli	26	(9)
2012–2015	Bansko	62	(13)
- * Club domestic league appearances and goals as of 4 June 2015

Kaloyan Stoyanov (born 2 November 1986 in Blagoevgrad) is a Bulgarian footballer who played as a forward.
