= Lyubomir Chernev =

Bulgarian football player

Personal information
- Full name: Lyubomir Nikolaev Chernev
- Date of birth: 27 May 1986 (age 40)
- Place of birth: Plovdiv, Bulgaria
- Height: 1.90 m (6 ft 3 in)
- Position: Midfielder

Team information
- Current team: Chavdar Byala Slatina

Senior career*
Years	Team	Apps	(Gls)
2006–2008	Sportist Svoge	44	(9)
2008–2009	Loko Plovdiv	4	(0)
2009	Spartak Plovdiv	6	(0)
2010	Rilski Sportist	10	(0)
2010–	Chavdar Byala Slatina		
- * Club domestic league appearances and goals as of 1 March 2009

Lyubomir Chernev (Bulgarian: Любомир Чернев) (born 27 May 1986) is a Bulgarian football player, currently playing for Chavdar Byala Slatina as a midfielder. Chernev is a left midfielder. His first club was Sportist Svoge.
