= Kaloyan Cvetkov =

Bulgarian footballer

Kaloyan Cvetkov (Bulgarian: Калоян Цветков) (born 27 September 1988) is a Bulgarian footballer, who plays for PFC Panayot Volov as a midfielder.
