= Ivan Petkov =

Bulgarian footballer

Personal information
- Full name: Ivan Aleksandrov Petkov
- Date of birth: 22 January 1985 (age 41)
- Place of birth: Veliko Tarnovo, Bulgaria
- Height: 1.87 m (6 ft 1 1/2 in)
- Position: Striker

Team information
- Current team: Etar II
- Number: 9

Youth career
- Etar Veliko Tarnovo II
- Valeks Tryavna

Senior career*
Years	Team	Apps	(Gls)
2005–2007	Zagorets	44	(13)
2007–2011	Kaliakra Kavarna	94	(37)
2011–2012	Spartak Varna	14	(1)
2012–2014	Kaliakra Kavarna	36	(6)
2014–2021	Etar Veliko Tarnovo	121	(40)
2021–2022	Yantra Gabrovo	57	(7)
2023–	Etar Veliko Tarnovo II	6	(4)
- * Club domestic league appearances and goals as of 22:13, 2 July 2023 (UTC)

Ivan Petkov (Bulgarian: Иван Петков; born 22 January 1985) is a Bulgarian footballer who currently plays for Etar Veliko Tarnovo II as a striker. Petkov started his career at Zagorets Nova Zagora and joined Kaliakra Kavarna in 2007.
