= List of Bulgarian football transfers summer 2014 =

This is a list of Bulgarian football transfers for the 2014 summer transfer window. Only transfers involving a team from the A PFG and B PFG are listed.

== A PFG ==
=== Beroe ===
In:

No.	Pos.	Nation	Player
4	MF	FRA	Alassane N'Diaye (from Lokomotiv Plovdiv)
5	DF	BUL	Tanko Dyakov (Free agent)
10	FW	BUL	Ventsislav Hristov (loan return from (Ukraine) Metalurh Donetsk)
11	MF	FRA	Chris Gadi (from Lokomotiv Plovdiv)
24	DF	SUI	Mihael Kovačević (Free agent)
25	MF	BUL	Dimo Bakalov (from Ludogorets Razgrad)

Out:

No.	Pos.	Nation	Player
5	DF	BUL	Borislav Stoychev (to Levski Sofia)
7	FW	BUL	Georgi Andonov (to (Turkey) Denizlispor)
13	MF	BUL	Nikolay Chipev (to Spartak Varna)
14	DF	BUL	Ignat Dishliev (to (Albania) Partizani Tirana)
19	MF	BUL	Martin Raynov (to Haskovo, previously on loan at Bansko)
29	FW	POR	Élio Martins (to (Portugal) União da Madeira)
88	FW	BUL	Viktor Shishkov (to Bansko)

=== Botev Plovdiv ===
In:

No.	Pos.	Nation	Player
3	DF	FRA	Romain Inez (from (France) Metz)
6	DF	BUL	Daniel Zlatkov (from (Turkey) Boluspor)
9	FW	BUL	Aleksandar Kolev (from (Belgium) Geel)
14	MF	BIH	Goran Galešić (from (Slovenia) Koper)
15	MF	BUL	Hristiyan Kazakov (loan return from Rakovski)
17	MF	BUL	Lachezar Baltanov (from Levski Sofia)
18	DF	BUL	Radoslav Terziev (loan return from Rakovski)
22	DF	BUL	Plamen Nikolov (from Litex Lovech)
23	FW	BUL	Tsvetelin Chunchukov (loan return from Rakovski)
24	DF	BUL	Lazar Marin (loan return from Rakovski)
30	MF	BUL	Bozhidar Vasev (loan return from Rakovski)
37	DF	BUL	Rosen Kolev (from Montana)
38	MF	BUL	Milen Gamakov (from Chernomorets Burgas)
48	MF	BUL	Borimir Karamfilov (loan return from Rakovski)
77	MF	BUL	Momchil Tsvetanov (from Litex Lovech)
89	GK	BUL	Mihail Ivanov (from Levski Sofia)
95	MF	BUL	Stanislav Dryanov (from Chernomorets Burgas)

Out:

No.	Pos.	Nation	Player
3	FW	CGO	Férébory Doré (on loan to (Romania) CFR Cluj)
4	DF	ROU	Srdjan Luchin (to (Romania) Steaua București)
6	DF	ROU	Alexandru Benga (to (Azerbaijan) Gabala)
8	MF	ROU	Alexandru Curtean (to (Romania) Gaz Metan Mediaș)
9	FW	TUN	Hamza Younés (to Ludogorets Razgrad)
10	MF	BRA	Vander Vieira (to (Cyprus) AEK Larnaca)
13	MF	BUL	Nikolay Pavlov (to Eurocollege, previously on loan at Rakovski)
14	DF	BUL	Veselin Minev (to Levski Sofia)
15	FW	NED	Luís Pedro (to Levski Sofia)
17	MF	MAD	Anicet Abel (to Ludogorets Razgrad)
21	GK	BUL	Filip Dimitrov (on loan to Spartak Varna)
22	FW	NED	Romario Kortzorg (to (Germany) Erzgebirge Aue)
24	DF	BUL	Dimitar Vezalov (to Slavia Sofia)
26	DF	BRA	Arthur Henrique (to (Belgium) Lokeren)
27	GK	BUL	Iliya Nikolov (loan return to Rakovski)
33	GK	BUL	Rosen Andonov (on loan to Vereya, previously on loan at Rakovski)
55	DF	BUL	Angel Rahov (to Montana, previously on loan at Rakovski)
83	DF	CUW	Civard Sprockel (end of contract)
88	MF	BUL	Georgi Sarmov (to Levski Sofia)

=== Cherno More ===
In:

No.	Pos.	Nation	Player
1	GK	BUL	Iliya Nikolov (from Rakovski)
8	MF	CPV	Sténio (from (Portugal) Feirense)
10	MF	NED	Marc Klok (from (Scotland) Ross County)
11	FW	BUL	Zhivko Petkov (from Neftochimic Burgas)
13	MF	BUL	Simeon Raykov (from Chernomorets Burgas)
18	MF	POL	Marcin Burkhardt (from (Poland) Miedź Legnica)
19	MF	MTQ	Mathias Coureur (from (Spain) Huracán Valencia)
26	GK	BUL	Ilko Pirgov (from Litex Lovech)
31	FW	BUL	Miroslav Manolov (from Litex Lovech)
—	GK	BUL	Kiril Akalski (from Lokomotiv Plovdiv)

Out:

No.	Pos.	Nation	Player
1	GK	BUL	Nik Dashev (released)
8	MF	BRA	Edenilson Bergonsi (to CSKA Sofia)
11	FW	BUL	Valeri Domovchiyski (to Levski Sofia)
20	MF	NGA	Stanley Okoro (loan return to (Spain) Almería B)
32	MF	BUL	Petko Tsankov (to Kaliakra Kavarna)
99	FW	BUL	Atanas Iliev (to Dobrudzha Dobrich)
—	GK	BUL	Kiril Akalski (to Rakovski)

=== CSKA Sofia ===
In:

No.	Pos.	Nation	Player
1	GK	BUL	Anatoli Gospodinov (loan return from Vitosha Bistritsa)
3	DF	BUL	Aleksandar Tunchev (from Lokomotiv Plovdiv)
5	DF	NED	Cendrino Misidjan (from (Netherlands) Sparta Rotterdam)
13	FW	LUX	Aurélien Joachim (from (Netherlands) RKC Waalwijk)
17	FW	ROU	Sergiu Buș (from (Romania) CFR Cluj)
20	MF	CPV	Platini (from (Cyprus) Omonia)
22	MF	BRA	Edenilson Bergonsi (from Cherno More)
28	MF	BUL	Marquinhos (from Lokomotiv Sofia)
31	DF	NED	Christian Supusepa (from (Netherlands) ADO Den Haag)
33	GK	CZE	Jakub Diviš (on loan from (Czech Republic) Mladá Boleslav)
34	MF	GER	Denis Prychynenko (from (Ukraine) Sevastopol)
48	DF	CRO	Marin Oršulić (from (Croatia) NK Zadar)
70	MF	BRA	Juan Felipe (from (Brazil) São Carlos)
77	DF	CRO	Tonći Kukoč (from (Italy) Brescia Calcio)

Out:

No.	Pos.	Nation	Player
2	DF	BUL	Zdravko Iliev (to Lokomotiv Plovdiv)
5	MF	BUL	Todor Yanchev (retired)
6	DF	SEN	Jackson Mendy (to Litex Lovech)
10	MF	BRA	Marcinho (to (Russia) Ufa)
12	GK	CZE	Tomáš Černý (to (Greece) Ergotelis)
17	MF	BUL	Martin Petrov (retired)
18	MF	BUL	Ivaylo Chochev (to (Italy) Palermo)
20	MF	FRA	Omar Kossoko (to Litex Lovech)
23	MF	BUL	Emil Gargorov (to (China) Shijiazhuang Yongchang)
26	FW	ARG	Guido Di Vanni (loan return to (Paraguay) Club Guaraní)
27	DF	ESP	Brian Herrero (to (Spain) Real Valladolid B)
37	DF	FRA	Jérémy Faug-Porret (end of contract)
45	FW	BUL	Grigor Dolapchiev (on loan to (North Macedonia) Horizont Turnovo)
92	GK	ALG	Raïs M'Bolhi (to (United States) Philadelphia Union)

=== Haskovo ===
In:

No.	Pos.	Nation	Player
5	MF	RUS	Oleg Shalayev (from Slavia Sofia)
6	MF	BUL	Dzhihat Kyamil (from Spartak Varna)
9	MF	BUL	Doncho Atanasov (Free agent)
16	MF	BUL	Georgi Korudzhiev (from Lokomotiv Plovdiv)
18	MF	GHA	Michael Tawiah (from Lyubimets 2007)
19	MF	BUL	Martin Raynov (from Beroe Stara Zagora)
20	DF	POR	Pedro Eugénio (from (Portugal) Farense)
22	GK	BUL	Boyan Peykov (Free agent)
24	DF	BUL	Martin Kovachev (from (North Macedonia) Pelister)
44	MF	BUL	Galin Dimov (from Neftochimic Burgas)
88	MF	BUL	Atanas Chipilov (from Bansko)

Out:

No.	Pos.	Nation	Player
3	DF	BUL	Teynur Marem (loan return to Ludogorets Razgrad)
5	DF	BUL	Petko Ganev (to Vereya)
18	FW	BUL	Yavor Vandev (to Kaliakra Kavarna)

=== Levski Sofia ===
In:

No.	Pos.	Nation	Player
1	GK	MKD	Kristijan Naumovski (from (Romania) Dinamo București)
5	DF	BUL	Borislav Stoychev (from Beroe Stara Zagora)
8	MF	BUL	Georgi Sarmov (from Botev Plovdiv)
10	MF	ESP	Miguel Bedoya (from (Spain) Numancia)
11	FW	NED	Luís Pedro (from Botev Plovdiv)
13	MF	ALG	Najib Ammari (from (Romania) CFR Cluj)
14	DF	BUL	Veselin Minev (from Botev Plovdiv)
15	MF	SVK	Roman Procházka (loan return from (Slovakia) Spartak Trnava)
17	FW	BUL	Valeri Domovchiyski (from Cherno More)
20	FW	ESP	Añete (from (Greece) Niki Volos)
—	GK	BUL	Stefano Kunchev (from Chernomorets Burgas)
—	DF	BUL	Radoslav Dimitrov (from Slavia Sofia)
—	MF	BUL	Lachezar Baltanov (from Chernomorets Burgas)

Out:

No.	Pos.	Nation	Player
1	GK	CRO	Goran Blažević (to (Russia) Torpedo Moscow)
2	DF	NED	Dustley Mulder (to (Cyprus) Apollon Limassol)
4	DF	BUL	Stanislav Angelov (retired)
6	MF	BUL	Orlin Starokin (to (Kazakhstan) Irtysh Pavlodar)
7	FW	BUL	Dimitar Makriev (to (Hong Kong) South China)
8	FW	BUL	Tsvetan Genkov (to (Turkey) Denizlispor)
16	MF	BRA	Rafael Bastos (to Kuwait SC)
17	DF	CZE	Pavel Čmovš (to (India) Mumbai City)
25	MF	BUL	Daniel Dimov (to (Israel) Maccabi Petah Tikva)
26	DF	BUL	Hristo Popadiyn (to Botev Vratsa, previously on loan at Vitosha Bistritsa)
27	MF	BUL	Steven Petkov (to Ludogorets Razgrad)
28	MF	POR	Cristóvão Ramos (to (Cyprus) Omonia)
40	DF	RSA	Ricardo Nunes (to (Poland) Pogoń Szczecin)
59	FW	GUI	Larsen Touré (to (France) Arles-Avignon)
75	MF	MRI	Kévin Bru (to (England) Ipswich Town)
86	FW	BUL	Valeri Bojinov (to (Italy) Ternana)
89	GK	BUL	Mihail Ivanov (to Botev Plovdiv)
—	GK	BUL	Stefano Kunchev (to (Greece) Trikala)
—	DF	BUL	Radoslav Dimitrov (released)
—	MF	BUL	Lachezar Baltanov (to Botev Plovdiv)

=== Litex Lovech ===
In:

No.	Pos.	Nation	Player
6	DF	SEN	Jackson Mendy (from CSKA Sofia)
12	GK	BUL	Aleksandar Konov (loan return from Dobrudzha Dobrich)
15	MF	BUL	Kristiyan Malinov (loan return from Dobrudzha Dobrich)
31	GK	BRA	Vinícius Barrivieira (from (Brazil) Vila Nova)
73	FW	BUL	Milcho Angelov (from Chernomorets Burgas)
78	MF	FRA	Omar Kossoko (from CSKA Sofia)
93	MF	CMR	Petrus Boumal (from (France) Sochaux)

Out:

No.	Pos.	Nation	Player
5	DF	BUL	Nikolay Bodurov (to (England) Fulham)
6	MF	BUL	Simeon Slavchev (to (Portugal) Sporting CP)
8	MF	BRA	Tom (loan return to (Turkey) İstanbul BB)
10	MF	ALB	Jurgen Gjasula (to (Germany) VfR Aalen)
11	FW	BUL	Miroslav Manolov (to Cherno More)
22	DF	BUL	Plamen Nikolov (to Botev Plovdiv)
26	GK	BUL	Ilko Pirgov (to Cherno More)
33	DF	BIH	Džemal Berberović (to (Bosnia and Herzegovina) FK Sarajevo)
77	MF	BUL	Momchil Tsvetanov (to Botev Plovdiv)
—	MF	BUL	Kristiyan Tafradzhiyski (released, previously on loan at Akademik Svishtov)
—	FW	BUL	Kristiyan Petkov (to Marek Dupnitsa, previously on loan at Dunav Ruse)

=== Lokomotiv Plovdiv ===
In:

No.	Pos.	Nation	Player
3	MF	BEL	Emmerik De Vriese (Free agent)
4	DF	BUL	Venelin Filipov (from Chernomorets Burgas)
5	MF	BUL	Georgi Valchev (from Lyubimets 2007)
6	DF	ARG	Elian Parrino (from (Argentina) Instituto)
7	FW	BUL	Branimir Kostadinov (from Chernomorets Burgas)
13	FW	BUL	Georgi Stefanov (from Lyubimets 2007)
17	DF	BUL	Bogomil Dyakov (from Montana)
18	DF	BUL	Hristo Stamov (loan return from Eurocollege)
19	MF	BUL	Blagoy Nakov (from Montana)
20	DF	BUL	Dian Moldovanov (from Montana)
21	FW	BUL	Bircent Karagaren (from Vereya)
22	MF	BUL	Yanko Sandanski (from Slavia Sofia)
23	MF	MKD	Vančo Trajanov (from Chernomorets Burgas)
24	MF	NGA	Oshobe Oladele (from (Albania) Partizani Tirana)
33	GK	BUL	Teodor Skorchev (from (Greece) Ethnikos Alexandroupoli)
84	DF	BUL	Zdravko Iliev (from CSKA Sofia)
91	GK	BUL	Bozhidar Stoychev (loan return from (North Macedonia) Rabotnički)
—	DF	BUL	Daniel Gramatikov (from Akademik Svishtov)

Out:

No.	Pos.	Nation	Player
3	DF	BUL	Valeri Georgiev (to Montana)
5	DF	BUL	Tihomir Trifonov (to Etar Veliko Tarnovo)
6	DF	BUL	Angel Yoshev (to Marek Dupnitsa)
17	DF	BUL	Kostadin Markov (to Septemvri Simitli)
18	DF	BUL	Asen Georgiev (to Montana)
20	MF	TUN	Tijani Belaïd (to (Tunisia) Club Africain)
21	FW	BUL	Stanko Yovchev (released)
22	MF	FRA	Alassane N'Diaye (to Beroe Stara Zagora)
23	GK	BUL	Kiril Akalski (to Cherno More)
28	MF	GRE	Stelios Iliadis (released)
30	MF	BUL	Yordan Todorov (to Lokomotiv Sofia)
33	DF	BUL	Aleksandar Tunchev (to CSKA Sofia)
45	FW	FRA	Joseph Mendes (to (France) Luzenac)
77	MF	BUL	Zdravko Lazarov (to Montana)
87	DF	BRA	Diego Ferraresso (to Slavia Sofia)
88	MF	BUL	Georgi Korudzhiev (to Haskovo)
91	FW	FRA	Chris Gadi (to Beroe Stara Zagora)
—	DF	BUL	Daniel Gramatikov (released)

=== Lokomotiv Sofia ===
In:

No.	Pos.	Nation	Player
9	FW	BUL	Preslav Yordanov (from Chernomorets Burgas)
10	MF	BUL	Georg Vasilev (loan return from (Italy) Parma)
11	MF	BUL	Vladislav Romanov (from Botev Vratsa)
14	MF	BUL	Daniel Vasev (from Botev Vratsa)
15	DF	BUL	Trayan Trayanov (from Chernomorets Burgas)
23	MF	BUL	Aleksandar Manolov (loan return from Marek Dupnitsa)
29	FW	TUN	Lamjed Chehoudi (from (Tunisia) Stade Tunisien)
47	MF	POR	Fernando Livramento (from (Portugal) Farense)
77	DF	BUL	Yordan Todorov (from Lokomotiv Plovdiv)

Out:

No.	Pos.	Nation	Player
3	DF	FRA	Luc-Christopher Matutu (released)
7	MF	BUL	Iskren Pisarov (to Chernomorets Burgas)
11	MF	BUL	Antonio Tsankov (to Rakovski)
14	FW	BUL	Dimitar Iliev (to (Poland) Wisła Płock)
24	DF	BUL	Iliyan Garov (to (Iceland) Víkingur Reykjavík)
28	MF	BUL	Marquinhos (to CSKA Sofia)
39	MF	TUN	Nabil Taïder (loan return to (Italy) Parma)
47	FW	BEL	Raoul Ngadrira (to (Belgium) R.E. Virton)
78	MF	BEL	Jean-Baptiste Yakassongo (released)
92	MF	FRA	Gaël N’Lundulu (to (Greece) Aris)
94	MF	CHA	Azrack Mahamat (to (Greece) Platanias)

=== Ludogorets Razgrad ===
In:

No.	Pos.	Nation	Player
12	MF	MAD	Anicet Abel (from Botev Plovdiv)
16	DF	COL	Brayan Angulo (from (Spain) Granada)
19	MF	BUL	Aleksandar Vasilev (from Kaliakra Kavarna)
24	DF	BUL	Preslav Petrov (from Vidima-Rakovski)
26	GK	CAN	Milan Borjan (from (Turkey) Sivasspor)
88	MF	BRA	Wanderson (from (Brazil) Portuguesa)
99	FW	TUN	Hamza Younés (from Botev Plovdiv)

Out:

No.	Pos.	Nation	Player
14	MF	NED	Mitchell Burgzorg (to Slavia Sofia)
19	MF	BUL	Dimo Bakalov (to Beroe Stara Zagora)
95	MF	NED	Jeroen Lumu (to (Netherlands) Heerenveen)
99	FW	BRA	Michel Platini (to Slavia Sofia)

=== Marek Dupnitsa ===
In:

No.	Pos.	Nation	Player
2	MF	BUL	Angel Rusev (from Vidima-Rakovski)
5	MF	BUL	Dimitar Petkov (from (Moldova) Tiraspol)
7	MF	BUL	Mario Bliznakov (from Pirin Gotse Delchev)
8	DF	BUL	Martin Dimitrov (from Master Burgas)
9	FW	BUL	Dimitar Dimitrov (from Pirin Razlog)
16	DF	BUL	Nikolay Nikolov (from Montana)
17	FW	BUL	Kristiyan Petkov (from Litex Lovech)
18	MF	BUL	Zlatko Bonev (from Vidima-Rakovski)
20	MF	BUL	Dimitar Iliev (from Pirin Blagoevgrad)
21	DF	BUL	Stamen Kazalov (from Vidima-Rakovski)
25	DF	BUL	Angel Yoshev (from Lokomotiv Plovdiv)
33	GK	BUL	Veselin Tsvetkovski (from Botev Vratsa)
—	MF	BUL	Milen Vasilev (from Chernomorets Burgas)

Out:

No.	Pos.	Nation	Player
5	DF	BUL	Ventsislav Bonev (to Minyor Pernik)
7	MF	BUL	Nikolay Hadzhinikolov (to Pirin Razlog)
8	MF	BUL	Daniel Mladenov (to Oborishte)
11	MF	BUL	Denis Stoilov (to Oborishte)
17	MF	BUL	Dimitar Georgiev (to Slavia Sofia)
23	MF	BUL	Aleksandar Manolov (loan return to Lokomotiv Sofia)
—	MF	BUL	Milen Vasilev (released)

=== Slavia Sofia ===
In:

No.	Pos.	Nation	Player
6	DF	CTA	Fernander Kassaï (from (France) Grenoble)
7	MF	FRA	Jérémy Manzorro (from Chernomorets Burgas)
8	MF	BUL	Stanislav Genchev (from (Cyprus) AEL Limassol)
9	FW	BUL	Villyan Bijev (from (England) Liverpool)
11	MF	NED	Mitchell Burgzorg (from Ludogorets Razgrad)
17	MF	BUL	Kostadin Dyakov (from PFC Burgas)
18	MF	BUL	Dimitar Georgiev (from Marek Dupnitsa)
20	FW	BRA	Michel Platini (from Ludogorets Razgrad)
26	DF	BUL	Dimitar Vezalov (from Botev Plovdiv)
33	MF	POR	Carlos Fonseca (from Chernomorets Burgas)
35	MF	BUL	Ivan Valchanov (from Lyubimets 2007)
71	DF	BRA	Diego Ferraresso (from Lokomotiv Plovdiv)
77	FW	MKD	Dušan Savić (from (Kazakhstan) Kaisar)
91	DF	BUL	Krum Stoyanov (from Chernomorets Burgas)

Out:

No.	Pos.	Nation	Player
3	DF	BUL	Velichko Velichkov (to PFC Burgas)
5	DF	BUL	Kostadin Velkov (to (Germany) Würzburger Kickers)
7	FW	BUL	Rangel Abushev (to (Cyprus) Enosis Neon Paralimni)
14	MF	BUL	Yanko Sandanski (to Lokomotiv Plovdiv)
17	MF	BUL	Veselin Marchev (to (Cyprus) Ayia Napa)
18	MF	SVN	Tadej Apatič (released)
20	DF	BUL	Radoslav Dimitrov (to Levski Sofia)
21	DF	BUL	Georgi Pashov (to Montana)
23	MF	RUS	Oleg Shalayev (to Haskovo)
26	DF	BUL	Aleksandar Dyulgerov (to (Romania) Concordia Chiajna)
33	MF	BUL	Galin Ivanov (to (Azerbaijan) Khazar Lankaran)
77	MF	BUL	Aleksandar Aleksandrov (to Minyor Pernik)

== B PFG ==
=== Bansko ===
In:

No.	Pos.	Nation	Player
1	GK	BUL	Plamen Kolev (from Neftochimic Burgas)
4	DF	BUL	Simeon Dimitrov (from Elit Sofia)
9	FW	BUL	Viktor Shishkov (from Beroe Stara Zagora)
11	MF	BUL	Yanislav Ivanov (from Kaliakra Kavarna)
18	DF	BUL	Georgi Fikiyn (from Pirin Razlog)
20	MF	BUL	Bogomil Hristov (from Slivnishki geroi)
21	FW	BUL	Borislav Hazurov (from Pirin Gotse Delchev)
24	MF	BUL	Lyubomir Vitanov (from Pirin Gotse Delchev)

Out:

No.	Pos.	Nation	Player
1	GK	BUL	Veselin Ganev (to Pirin Blagoevgrad)
9	FW	BUL	Sergey Georgiev (to Montana)
10	MF	BUL	Pavel Petkov (to Botev Vratsa)
11	MF	BUL	Radoslav Kalistrin (released)
14	FW	BUL	Gerasim Zakov (to (Greece) PAO Varda)
20	MF	BUL	Atanas Dimitrov (to Lokomotiv Gorna Oryahovitsa)
21	MF	BUL	Atanas Chipilov (to Haskovo)
22	DF	BUL	Kristiyan Uzunov (to Oborishte)
23	MF	BUL	Lyuboslav Voynov (to Pirin Blagoevgrad)

=== Botev Galabovo ===
In:

No.	Pos.	Nation	Player
33	DF	BUL	Nikolay Yankov (from Vereya)

Out:

No.	Pos.	Nation	Player
6	FW	BUL	Redzheb Halil (to Sozopol)
9	DF	BUL	Dzhuneyt Ali (to Vereya)
14	DF	BUL	Stanislav Katrankov (to Sozopol)
17	MF	BUL	Daniel Dobrikov (to Dimitrovgrad)
55	MF	BUL	Isus Angelov (to Vereya)

=== Botev Vratsa ===
In:

No.	Pos.	Nation	Player
4	DF	BUL	Hristo Popadiyn (from Levski Sofia)
7	MF	ITA	Alessandro Del Genio (from (Italy) Verbania Calcio)
9	FW	BUL	Vasil Kaloyanov (from PFC Burgas)
13	MF	BUL	Mario Yankov (from Vihren Sandanski)
14	MF	BUL	Pavel Petkov (from Bansko)
21	GK	BUL	Yulian Levashki (from (Switzerland) FC Ursy)
22	MF	BUL	Georgi Stoichkov (from Vitosha Bistritsa)
23	MF	BUL	Kiril Atanasov (from Vitosha Bistritsa)
27	FW	BUL	Aleksandar Dimitrov (from Minyor Radnevo)
33	GK	ITA	Angelo Montenegro (from (Italy) Viareggio)

Out:

No.	Pos.	Nation	Player
3	DF	ITA	Edoardo Zita (released)
4	MF	BUL	Daniel Vasev (to Lokomotiv Sofia)
5	DF	BUL	Georgi Peychev (to Montana)
7	MF	BUL	Iliya Iliev (retired)
9	FW	BUL	Yuliyan Nenov (to Montana)
10	MF	BUL	Vladislav Romanov (to Lokomotiv Sofia)
19	MF	BUL	Kiril Ivanov (released)
21	FW	BUL	Georgi Borisov (released)
23	MF	BUL	Yordan Apostolov (to Lokomotiv Gorna Oryahovitsa)
33	GK	BUL	Veselin Tsvetkovski (to Marek Dupnitsa)

=== Burgas ===
In:

No.	Pos.	Nation	Player
2	DF	BUL	Todor Gochev (from Montana)
3	DF	BUL	Petar Patev (from Spartak Varna)
4	MF	BUL	Simeon Mechev (from Neftochimic Burgas)
5	DF	BUL	Stoyan Kalpakliev (from Chernomorets Burgas U19)
7	MF	BUL	Lyubomir Lyubenov (from (North Macedonia) Pelister)
8	MF	BUL	Nikolay Botev (from Spartak Varna)
9	FW	BUL	Georgi Stanchev (from Kaliakra Kavarna)
11	FW	BUL	Daniel Shmedin (Free agent)
13	MF	BUL	Marin Dimitrov (from Chernomorets Burgas U19)
14	DF	BUL	Velichko Velichkov (from Slavia Sofia)
17	MF	BUL	Yani Pehlivanov (from Chernomorets Burgas)
18	MF	BUL	Anatoli Todorov (from Vitosha Bistritsa)
19	FW	BUL	Ahmed Ahmedov (from Chernomorets Burgas U19)
20	DF	BUL	Yuri Ivanov (from Neftochimic Burgas)
23	MF	BUL	Borislav Borisov (from Spartak Varna)

Out:

No.	Pos.	Nation	Player
—	DF	BUL	Martin Dimitrov (to Marek Dupnitsa)
—	MF	BUL	Kostadin Dyakov (to Slavia Sofia)
—	MF	BUL	Mihail Georgiev (to Sozopol)
—	MF	BUL	Trendafil Momchilov (released)
—	MF	BUL	Stoyan Kalev (to Chernomorets Burgas)
—	MF	BUL	Ivaylo Petrov (to Chernomorets Burgas)
—	MF	BUL	Milen Tanev (to Chernomorets Burgas)
—	MF	BUL	Hristo Lemperov (to (Angola) Académica do Lobito)
—	MF	BUL	Pavel Aleksiev (released)
—	MF	BUL	Zhulien Parushev (released)
—	MF	BUL	Georgi Kaloyanov (released)
—	FW	BUL	Vasil Tachev (to Chernomorets Balchik)
—	FW	BUL	Vasil Kaloyanov (to Botev Vratsa)
—	FW	BUL	Raicho Raev (to FC Karnobat)
—	FW	BUL	Anton Ivanov (released)

=== Chernomorets Burgas ===
In:

No.	Pos.	Nation	Player
3	DF	BUL	Ivan Stoyanov (from Nesebar)
5	DF	BUL	Lyubomir Gutsev (from Pirin Gotse Delchev)
7	MF	BUL	Stefan Traykov (from Akademik Svishtov)
8	MF	BUL	Milen Tanev (from PFC Burgas)
10	MF	BUL	Mihael Orachev (from Neftochimic Burgas)
11	MF	BUL	Iskren Pisarov (from Lokomotiv Sofia)
13	MF	BUL	Ahmed Hikmet (from (Germany) Wacker Neutraubling)
14	DF	BUL	Petar Alyoshev (from Lyubimets 2007)
16	MF	BUL	Stoyan Kalev (from PFC Burgas)
18	FW	BUL	Deyan Hristov (from Spartak Varna)
19	MF	BUL	Petar Lazarov (from Montana)
23	MF	BUL	Ivaylo Petrov (from PFC Burgas)

Out:

No.	Pos.	Nation	Player
1	MF	SRB	Mladen Živković (to (Serbia) Sinđelić Beograd)
3	DF	BUL	Martin Dimov (to Dunav Ruse)
4	MF	BUL	Milen Vasilev (to Marek Dupnitsa)
7	FW	BUL	Milcho Angelov (to Litex Lovech)
8	MF	BUL	Milen Gamakov (to Botev Plovdiv)
9	FW	BUL	Preslav Yordanov (to Lokomotiv Sofia)
10	FW	GHA	Godfred Bekoé (released)
11	MF	BUL	Simeon Raykov (to Cherno More)
13	DF	BUL	Trayan Trayanov (to Lokomotiv Sofia)
14	MF	FRA	Jérémy Manzorro (to Slavia Sofia)
17	MF	MKD	Vančo Trajanov (to Lokomotiv Plovdiv)
19	MF	BUL	Stanislav Dryanov (to Botev Plovdiv)
20	MF	BUL	Yani Pehlivanov (to PFC Burgas)
21	DF	MKD	Aleksandar Damčevski (to (Netherlands) NAC Breda)
23	DF	POR	Chico (to (Portugal) União da Madeira)
25	DF	BUL	Krum Stoyanov (to Slavia Sofia)
30	MF	BUL	Lachezar Baltanov (to Levski Sofia)
32	GK	BUL	Stefano Kunchev (to Levski Sofia)
44	DF	BUL	Venelin Filipov (to Lokomotiv Plovdiv)
45	MF	BUL	Slavcho Shokolarov (to (Northern Cyprus) Bostancı Bağcıl)
70	FW	BUL	Branimir Kostadinov (to Lokomotiv Plovdiv)
87	MF	POR	Carlos Fonseca (to Slavia Sofia)
—	MF	BUL	Stoyan Valchev (to Nesebar)

=== Dobrudzha ===
In:

No.	Pos.	Nation	Player
1	GK	BUL	Pavel Petkov (loan return from Suvorovo)
11	MF	BUL	Ivaylo Lazarov (from Dunav Ruse)
15	MF	BUL	Mustafa Mustafa (from Kaliakra Kavarna)
99	FW	BUL	Atanas Iliev (from Cherno More)

Out:

No.	Pos.	Nation	Player
18	MF	BUL	Kristiyan Malinov (loan return to Litex Lovech)
25	GK	BUL	Aleksandar Konov (loan return to Litex Lovech)

=== Lokomotiv Gorna Oryahovitsa ===
In:

No.	Pos.	Nation	Player
8	MF	BUL	Iliya Karapetrov (from Pirin Gotse Delchev)
9	FW	BUL	Nikolay Ivanov (from Etar Veliko Tarnovo)
10	FW	BUL	Yanaki Smirnov (from Spartak Varna)
13	MF	BUL	Atanas Dimitrov (from Bansko)
17	MF	BUL	Ivaylo Mihaylov (from Akademik Svishtov)
26	DF	BUL	Mariyan Ivanov (from Etar Veliko Tarnovo)
44	DF	BUL	Aleksandar Goranov (from Akademik Svishtov)
71	MF	BUL	Plamen Iliev (from Spartak Pleven)
77	DF	BUL	Denislav Mitsakov (from Litex Lovech U19)
80	MF	BUL	Radoslav Baychev (from (Austria) Kapfenberger SV)
87	GK	BUL	Radoslav Rashkov (from Lyubimets 2007)
88	MF	BUL	Yordan Apostolov (from Botev Vratsa)

Out:

No.	Pos.	Nation	Player
—	DF	BUL	Daniel Panayotov (released)
—	DF	BUL	Lyubomir Stefanov (released)
—	DF	BUL	Todor Stoev (released)
—	MF	BUL	Ivaylo Petrov (released)
—	MF	BUL	Nikolay Petrov (to Etar Veliko Tarnovo)
—	MF	BUL	Yordan Petrov (released)
—	FW	BUL	Tihomir Kanev (to Sozopol)

=== Lokomotiv Mezdra ===
In:

No.	Pos.	Nation	Player
6	MF	BUL	Mihael Kisyov (from Vitosha Bistritsa)
10	MF	BUL	Borislav Baldzhiyski (from Botev Ihtiman)
15	DF	BUL	Georgi Pavlov (from Vitosha Bistritsa)
18	DF	BUL	Stoyan Georgiev (from Dunav Ruse)
—	MF	BUL	Georgi Vasilev (from Botev Ihtiman)

Out:

No.	Pos.	Nation	Player
2	DF	BUL	Stoyan Mitev (released)
3	DF	BUL	Viktor Stoyanov (released)
6	MF	BUL	Plamen Buzov (to Botev Kozloduy)
10	MF	BUL	Boris Tonchev (released)
16	MF	BUL	Kristiyan Mankovski (released)
17	MF	BUL	Brian Stoyanov (released)
24	FW	BUL	Kiril Krastev (released)
89	GK	BUL	Hristo Matev (to Bdin Vidin)

=== Montana ===
In:

No.	Pos.	Nation	Player
3	DF	BUL	Ivan Mihov (from (Kazakhstan) Akzhayik)
4	DF	BUL	Georgi Peychev (from Botev Vratsa)
5	DF	BUL	Asen Georgiev (from Lokomotiv Plovdiv)
8	MF	BUL	Ivan Minchev (from Spartak Varna)
9	FW	BUL	Miroslav Antonov (from (Israel) Maccabi Yavne)
10	FW	BUL	Zdravko Lazarov (from Lokomotiv Plovdiv)
11	FW	BUL	Yuliyan Nenov (from Botev Vratsa)
14	DF	BUL	Angel Rahov (from Botev Plovdiv)
15	MF	BUL	Hristofor Hubchev (from (Germany) Bonner SC)
17	DF	BUL	Georgi Pashov (from Slavia Sofia)
21	MF	BUL	Hristian Popov (from (Germany) Berliner AK 07)
22	FW	BUL	Sergey Georgiev (from Bansko)
26	DF	BUL	Valeri Georgiev (from Lokomotiv Plovdiv)

Out:

No.	Pos.	Nation	Player
2	DF	BUL	Georgi Mechedzhiev (end of contract)
3	DF	BUL	Todor Gochev (to PFC Burgas)
4	DF	BUL	Kristiyan Zdravkov (released)
6	MF	BUL	Vladimir Bayrev (released)
8	MF	BUL	Petar Lazarov (to Chernomorets Burgas)
10	FW	BUL	Ventsislav Ivanov (to (Iceland) Víkingur Reykjavík)
12	GK	BUL	Stoyan Vasev (released)
13	DF	BUL	Nikolay Nikolov (to Marek Dupnitsa)
14	MF	BUL	Krasimir Iliev (to Spartak Varna)
15	DF	BUL	Ivelino Ivanov (released)
17	MF	BUL	Blagoy Nakov (to Lokomotiv Plovdiv)
19	DF	BUL	Dian Moldovanov (to Lokomotiv Plovdiv)
20	DF	BUL	Kristiyan Mitov (released)
22	MF	BUL	Anton Kostadinov (to Pirin Blagoevgrad)
23	DF	BUL	Bogomil Dyakov (to Lokomotiv Plovdiv)
26	DF	BUL	Martin Vasilev (released)
—	DF	BUL	Rosen Kolev (to Botev Plovdiv)

=== Pirin Blagoevgrad ===
In:

No.	Pos.	Nation	Player
5	MF	BUL	Lyuboslav Voynov (from Bansko)
10	FW	BUL	Martin Toshev (from Septemvri Simitli)
11	MF	BUL	Tomislav Pavlov (from Minyor Pernik)
12	GK	BUL	Veselin Ganev (from Bansko)
14	DF	BUL	Stilyan Nikolov (from Slivnishki geroi)
22	GK	BUL	Krasimir Kostov (from Pirin Razlog)
23	FW	BUL	Tsvetan Varsanov (from Pirin Razlog)
24	MF	BUL	Anton Kostadinov (from Montana)
25	DF	BUL	David Stoyanov (from Minyor Pernik)

Out:

No.	Pos.	Nation	Player
5	MF	BUL	Dimitar Iliev (to Marek Dupnitsa)
8	MF	BUL	Antonio Laskov (released)
10	FW	BUL	Veselin Stoykov (released)
11	MF	BUL	Vladislav Shumantov (released)
16	MF	BUL	Dzheyhan Zaydenov (to Pirin Razlog)
24	DF	BUL	Stanislav Bachev (retired)
25	DF	BUL	Atanas Spiriev (to Pirin Razlog)
26	MF	BUL	Andon Gushterov (to Septemvri Simitli)

=== Pirin Razlog ===
In:

No.	Pos.	Nation	Player
1	GK	BUL	Martin Lukov (from Vitosha Bistritsa)
4	MF	BUL	Dzheyhan Zaydenov (from Pirin Blagoevgrad)
7	FW	BUL	Vladimir Kaptiev (from Oborishte)
10	MF	BUL	Nikolay Hadzhinikolov (from Marek Dupnitsa)
11	MF	BUL	Milen Lefterov (from Mesta Hadzhidimovo)
15	DF	BUL	Atanas Spiriev (from Pirin Blagoevgrad)
19	MF	BUL	Denis Nikolov (from Slivnishki geroi)

Out:

No.	Pos.	Nation	Player
1	GK	BUL	Krasimir Kostov (to Pirin Blagoevgrad)
4	MF	BUL	Nikolay Andreev (released)
7	DF	BUL	Georgi Fikiyn (to Bansko)
15	FW	BUL	Nikola Mitsanski (to Belasitsa Petrich)
19	FW	BUL	Dimitar Dimitrov (to Marek Dupnitsa)
22	FW	BUL	Tsvetan Varsanov (to Pirin Blagoevgrad)
27	GK	BUL	Tsvetan Todorov (released)

=== Rakovski 2011 ===
In:

No.	Pos.	Nation	Player
1	GK	BUL	Dimitar Grabchev (from Oborishte)
3	FW	BUL	Atanas Lyubenov (from Vereya)
4	MF	BUL	Peyo Batinov (from Svilengrad 1921)
5	DF	BUL	Nikolay Domakinov (from Sozopol)
6	MF	BUL	Stefan Uchikov (Free agent)
8	MF	BUL	Antonio Tsankov (from Lokomotiv Sofia)
10	MF	BUL	Stefan Kikov (from (Greece) Doxa Drama)
12	GK	BUL	Kiril Akalski (from Cherno More)
13	DF	BUL	Rangel Kordov (from Spartak Plovdiv)
15	DF	BUL	Iliyan Enchev (from Oborishte)
17	MF	BUL	Dobrin Orlovski (from Gigant Saedinenie)
18	MF	BUL	Tsvetelin Tonev (from Levski Sofia)
19	DF	BUL	Emil Argirov (from Lyubimets 2007)
21	FW	BUL	Plamen Tabakov (from Eurocollege)

Out:

No.	Pos.	Nation	Player
1	GK	BUL	Stefan Stoychev (released)
2	MF	BUL	Hristo Telkiyski (released)
3	DF	BUL	Tsvetan Yotov (to Spartak Plovdiv)
4	DF	BUL	Radoslav Terziev (loan return to Botev Plovdiv)
5	DF	BUL	Angel Rahov (loan return to Botev Plovdiv)
6	MF	BUL	Bozhidar Vasev (loan return to Botev Plovdiv)
8	MF	BUL	Hristiyan Kazakov (loan return to Botev Plovdiv)
10	MF	BUL	Lachezar Angelov (loan return to Botev Plovdiv)
11	MF	BUL	Ventsislav Gyuzelev (loan return to Botev Plovdiv)
15	DF	BUL	Lazar Marin (loan return to Botev Plovdiv)
19	MF	BUL	Borimir Karamfilov (loan return to Botev Plovdiv)
22	MF	BUL	Nikolay Pavlov (loan return to Botev Plovdiv)
23	FW	BUL	Tsvetelin Chunchukov (loan return to Botev Plovdiv)
25	MF	BUL	Stamen Angelov (to Etar Veliko Tarnovo)
27	GK	BUL	Iliya Nikolov (to Cherno More, previously on loan at Botev Plovdiv)
33	GK	BUL	Rosen Andonov (loan return to Botev Plovdiv)

=== Septemvri Simitli ===
In:

No.	Pos.	Nation	Player
9	MF	BUL	Andon Gushterov (from Pirin Blagoevgrad)
16	MF	BUL	Iliyan Iliev (from Minyor Pernik)
17	DF	BUL	Kostadin Markov (from Lokomotiv Plovdiv)
19	FW	BUL	Metodi Kostov (from Minyor Pernik)
21	DF	BUL	Radoslav Bachev (from Akademik Svishtov)

Out:

No.	Pos.	Nation	Player
—	DF	BUL	Ibraim Stamboliev (to Minyor Pernik)
—	MF	BUL	Ivan Baltov (released)
—	MF	BUL	Mustafa Yashar (to Minyor Pernik)
—	MF	BUL	Ivaylo Ivanov (to Belasitsa Petrich)
—	FW	BUL	Daniel Dyulgerov (released)
—	FW	BUL	Martin Toshev (to Pirin Blagoevgrad)
—	FW	BUL	Lachezar Georgiev (released)

=== Sozopol ===
In:

No.	Pos.	Nation	Player
2	DF	BUL	Angel Delchev (from Eurocollege)
5	DF	BUL	Ivaylo Rusev (from Spartak Varna)
6	DF	BUL	Georgi Radev (from Lyubimets 2007)
9	FW	BUL	Tihomir Kanev (from Lokomotiv Gorna Oryahovitsa)
12	GK	BUL	Eduard Mechikyan (from Oskar E.L. Sofia)
15	FW	BUL	Redzheb Halil (from Botev Galabovo)
16	DF	BUL	Stanislav Katrankov (from Botev Galabovo)
20	MF	BUL	Ventsislav Gyuzelev (from Botev Plovdiv)
23	MF	BUL	Mihail Georgiev (from PFC Burgas)
24	DF	BUL	Rostislav Yankov (from Kaliakra Kavarna)
25	MF	BUL	Iliyan Kapitanov (from Lyubimets 2007)

Out:

No.	Pos.	Nation	Player
5	DF	BUL	Nikolay Domakinov (to Rakovski 2011)
9	FW	BUL	Stefan Toshkov (released)
10	MF	BUL	Mihail Ralev (retired)
15	MF	BUL	Zhelyazko Todorov (retired)
18	MF	BUL	Stanimir Dimitrov (released)
20	DF	BUL	Spas Donchev (to Tundzha Yambol)

=== Spartak Varna ===
In:

No.	Pos.	Nation	Player
1	GK	BUL	Ivaylo Krusharski (Free agent)
6	DF	BUL	Daniel Haralambov (from Nesebar)
7	FW	BUL	Diyan Malchev (from Neftochimic Burgas)
9	FW	BUL	Plamen Ivanov (from Chernomorets Byala)
10	FW	BUL	Orlin Orlinov (Free agent)
14	FW	BUL	Evtim Dimitrov (from Neftochimic Burgas)
15	MF	BUL	Nikolay Chipev (from Beroe Stara Zagora)
20	FW	BUL	Stanimir Dimitrov (from Spartak Plovdiv)
22	DF	BUL	Chris Yonev (from Neftochimic Burgas)
23	MF	BUL	Nikola Yanachkov (from Lyubimets 2007)
25	FW	SRB	Nikola Radulović (Free agent)
29	FW	BUL	Ognyan Stefanov (from Pirin Gotse Delchev)
33	GK	BUL	Filip Dimitrov (on loan from Botev Plovdiv)
37	DF	BUL	Petar Petrov (from Cherno More U19)
74	MF	BUL	Krasimir Iliev (from Montana)

Out:

No.	Pos.	Nation	Player
1	GK	BUL	Petar Denchev (to (Uzbekistan) Navbahor Namangan)
2	DF	BUL	Trayan Dyankov (to Kaliakra Kavarna)
5	DF	BUL	Ivaylo Rusev (to Sozopol)
6	MF	BUL	Dzhihat Kyamil (to Haskovo)
7	MF	BUL	Ivan Minchev (to Montana)
8	MF	BUL	Georgi Dimitrov (released)
9	FW	BUL	Yanaki Smirnov (to Lokomotiv Gorna Oryahovitsa)
10	MF	BUL	Stanislav Zhelyazkov (released)
12	GK	BUL	Genko Slavov (released)
14	MF	BUL	Iliyan Nedelchev (to Cherno More U21)
15	MF	BUL	Nikolay Botev (to PFC Burgas)
16	MF	BUL	Valentin Veselinov (to (Greece) Trikala)
17	MF	BUL	Nikola Arnaudov (released)
18	FW	BUL	Deyan Hristov (to Chernomorets Burgas)
19	DF	BUL	Petar Patev (to PFC Burgas)
22	MF	BUL	Borislav Borisov (to PFC Burgas)
23	FW	BUL	Vladislav Mirchev (released)

=== Vereya ===
In:

No.	Pos.	Nation	Player
1	GK	BUL	Rosen Andonov (on loan from Botev Plovdiv)
2	DF	BUL	Dzhuneyt Ali (from Botev Galabovo)
5	DF	BUL	Petko Ganev (from Haskovo)
9	FW	BDI	Jonathan Nanizayamo (from (Spain) Real Sociedad B)
10	MF	BUL	Dzhuneyt Yashar (from Kaliakra Kavarna)
11	MF	ALG	Billel Abdelkadous (from (Algeria) RC Arbaâ)
14	MF	BUL	Nikolay Kirov (from Dimitrovgrad)
15	MF	BUL	Konstantin Atanasov (from Spartak Plovdiv)
17	DF	BUL	Nikolay Kostov (from Neftochimic Burgas)
20	MF	BUL	Petar Kazakov (from Chavdar Etropole)
21	MF	NIG	Olivier Bonnes (Free agent)
22	GK	MAR	Yassine El Kharroubi (from (Morocco) MAS Fez)
45	MF	BUL	Isus Angelov (from Botev Galabovo)
99	FW	BUL	Angel Kostov (from Beroe Stara Zagora U19)

Out:

No.	Pos.	Nation	Player
—	DF	BUL	Stefan Krachunov (released)
—	DF	BUL	Dimitar Vakavliev (to Rozova Dolina)
—	DF	BUL	Nikolay Yankov (to Botev Galabovo)
—	MF	BUL	Hristo Gabarov (released)
—	MF	BUL	Daniel Demirev (released)
—	MF	BUL	Lyudmil Kirov (retired)
—	MF	BUL	Shaban Osmanov (to Asenovets)
—	MF	BUL	Emil Rachev (released)
—	MF	BUL	Hyusein Filipov (to Zagorets Nova Zagora)
—	FW	BUL	Atanas Lyubenov (to Rakovski)
—	FW	BUL	Zahari Dimitrov (to FC Kubrat)
—	FW	BUL	Bircent Karagaren (to Lokomotiv Plovdiv)
