= List of Bulgarian football transfers winter 2015–16 =

This is a list of Bulgarian football transfers for the 2015–16 winter transfer window. Only transfers involving a team from the A Group and B Group are listed.

== A Group ==
=== Beroe ===
In:

No.	Pos.	Nation	Player
8	MF	BUL	Georgi Sarmov (from (Romania) Poli Timișoara)
17	MF	POR	Pedrito (from (Angola) Interclube)
71	DF	BUL	Iliya Milanov (from Litex Lovech)
87	MF	FRA	Benjamin Morel (from (Slovenia) Domžale)

Out:

No.	Pos.	Nation	Player
4	DF	BUL	Venelin Filipov (to (Romania) Voluntari)
11	MF	BUL	Anton Ognyanov (to Dunav Ruse)
16	MF	BUL	Kiril Lichev (on loan to Vereya)
17	MF	BUL	Ivan Kokonov (to Montana)
—	DF	BUL	Plamen Tenev (on loan to Vereya, previously on loan at Spartak Pleven)

=== Botev Plovdiv ===
In:

No.	Pos.	Nation	Player
4	DF	UKR	Ihor Oshchypko (from (Moldova) Zaria Bălți)
8	MF	BUL	Todor Nedelev (on loan from (Germany) Mainz 05)
9	MF	BUL	Emil Kamberov (loan return from Lokomotiv GO)

Out:

No.	Pos.	Nation	Player
2	DF	BUL	Nikola Marin (to Nesebar)
3	DF	BUL	Georgi Kupenov (on loan to Dobrudzha Dobrich)
4	DF	BUL	Vladimir Aytov (to Dobrudzha Dobrich)
9	FW	BUL	Aleksandar Kolev (to (Belgium) Geel)
13	MF	BUL	Hristiyan Kazakov (to Dobrudzha Dobrich)
20	MF	URU	Nico Varela (to (Greece) AEL)
22	DF	BUL	Plamen Nikolov (to Cherno More)
26	MF	BUL	Valentin Tomov (to Eurocollege)
39	FW	BUL	Dimitar Aleksiev (to Lokomotiv GO)
96	MF	BUL	Daniel Genov (to Pirin Blagoevgrad)
99	FW	COD	Joël Tshibamba (released)
—	FW	BUL	Rangel Ignatov (on loan to Pirin Razlog)

=== Cherno More ===
In:

No.	Pos.	Nation	Player
21	MF	BUL	Georgi Iliev (from (China) Shijiazhuang Ever Bright)
22	DF	BUL	Plamen Nikolov (from Botev Plovdiv)
23	MF	BUL	Ivan Valchanov (from Slavia Sofia)
28	MF	SRB	Ivan Marković (from (Greece) Levadiakos)
55	DF	BUL	Borislav Stoychev (from (Greece) Atromitos)
73	MF	BUL	Vladislav Romanov (from (Greece) Trikala)

Out:

No.	Pos.	Nation	Player
1	GK	BUL	Iliya Nikolov (to Maritsa Plovdiv)
14	FW	ARG	Juan Varea (to (Albania) Bylis Ballsh)
18	MF	POL	Marcin Burkhardt (to (Norway) Ullensaker/Kisa IL)
20	FW	BUL	Villyan Bijev (to (United States) Portland Timbers 2)
21	MF	FRA	Mehdi Bourabia (to Levski Sofia)
23	DF	POR	Ginho (released)

=== Levski Sofia ===
In:

No.	Pos.	Nation	Player
2	DF	ROU	Srdjan Luchin (from (Romania) Poli Timișoara)
5	DF	BUL	Aleksandar Aleksandrov (from Ludogorets Razgrad)
7	MF	GHA	Francis Narh (from (Czech Republic) Baník Ostrava)
11	FW	CMR	Justin Mengolo (Free agent)
17	FW	NGA	Tunde Adeniji (from (Nigeria) Sunshine Stars)
27	MF	FRA	Mehdi Bourabia (from Cherno More)
91	FW	BUL	Ventsislav Hristov (from (Croatia) Rijeka)

Out:

No.	Pos.	Nation	Player
3	DF	TUN	Aymen Belaïd (to (England) Rotherham United)
7	FW	MKD	Denis Mahmudov (to (Armenia) Banants)
9	FW	BUL	Atanas Kurdov (released)
11	FW	FRA	Oumar Diaby (to (Scotland) Hamilton Academical)
19	FW	BUL	Iliya Dimitrov (on loan to Neftochimic Burgas)
20	DF	BUL	Zhivko Milanov (to (Cyprus) APOEL)
22	MF	BUL	Vladislav Misyak (to Neftochimic Burgas)
45	MF	BUL	Vladimir Gadzhev (to (England) Coventry City)
55	DF	BUL	Yordan Miliev (end of contract)
89	GK	BUL	Nikolay Krastev (on loan to Lokomotiv Mezdra)
99	MF	FRA	Lynel Kitambala (to (Belgium) Union SG)

=== Litex Lovech ===
In:

No.	Pos.	Nation	Player
1	GK	BUL	Marin Orlinov (loan return from Spartak Pleven)
10	MF	BUL	Vasil Shopov (from Spartak Pleven)
16	MF	COL	Gustavo Culma (from (Colombia) Once Caldas)

Out:

No.	Pos.	Nation	Player
2	DF	BUL	Iliya Munin (to Bansko)
10	MF	COL	Henry Rojas (to (Colombia) Millonarios)
16	DF	BUL	Strahil Popov (to (Turkey) Kasımpaşa)
18	DF	BUL	Iliya Milanov (to Beroe Stara Zagora)
69	DF	FRA	Helton Dos Reis (to (China) Shenzhen)
70	MF	COL	Danilo Asprilla (to (United Arab Emirates) Al Ain)
—	MF	BUL	Angel Zdravchev (to Dunav Ruse)
—	FW	BUL	Kristiyan Tafradzhiyski (on loan to Sozopol, previously on loan at Akademik)

=== Lokomotiv Plovdiv ===
In:

No.	Pos.	Nation	Player
4	MF	MKD	Stefan Jevtoski (from (North Macedonia) Metalurg Skopje)
10	MF	BUL	Veselin Marchev (from (Cyprus) Nea Salamis)
15	DF	BUL	Ivan Ivanov (from (Switzerland) Basel)
18	MF	BUL	Martin Raynov (from Lokomotiv GO)
20	MF	POR	Paulo Teles (from (Spain) Deportivo de La Coruña)
29	DF	FRA	Yassine Amrioui (Free agent)
55	DF	BUL	Martin Kavdanski (from (Albania) KF Tirana)
99	FW	SEN	Mansour Gueye (Free agent)

Out:

No.	Pos.	Nation	Player
1	GK	BUL	Teodor Skorchev (released)
10	MF	BUL	Iliyan Yordanov (to (Serbia) Borac Čačak)
18	DF	BUL	Hristo Stamov (to Oborishte)
23	MF	FRA	Loïc Dufau (released)
28	FW	MKD	Zoran Baldovaliev (to (Greece) Kerkyra)
89	MF	FRA	Yohann Lasimant (released)
90	MF	NIG	Olivier Bonnes (to Montana)

=== Ludogorets Razgrad ===
In:

No.	Pos.	Nation	Player

Out:

No.	Pos.	Nation	Player
7	MF	BUL	Mihail Aleksandrov (to (Poland) Legia Warsaw)
15	DF	BUL	Aleksandar Aleksandrov (to Levski Sofia)
–	FW	TUN	Hamza Younés (on loan to (Romania) Concordia Chiajna)

=== Montana ===
In:

No.	Pos.	Nation	Player
4	MF	ALG	Nabil Ejenavi (Free agent)
7	MF	BUL	Ivan Kokonov (from Beroe Stara Zagora)
10	FW	BUL	Ivan Stoyanov (from Vereya)
13	DF	BUL	Raif Muradov (from Botev Vratsa)
19	MF	BUL	Tsvetan Varsanov (from Botev Vratsa)
20	FW	BUL	Petar Atanasov (on loan from Slavia Sofia)
24	MF	NIG	Olivier Bonnes (from Lokomotiv Plovdiv)

Out:

No.	Pos.	Nation	Player
7	MF	BUL	Yordan Todorov (to Kariana Erden)
10	MF	ALB	Albi Dosti (to (Albania) KF Laçi)
11	MF	BUL	Borislav Baldzhiyski (to Slavia Sofia)
14	MF	BUL	Lyubomir Genchev (to Etar Veliko Tarnovo)
18	MF	BUL	Yanko Angelov (to Pirin Razlog)
19	FW	SVN	Matej Poplatnik (to (Slovenia) Triglav Kranj)
21	MF	BUL	Hristian Popov (to Vereya)
23	FW	BUL	Aleksandar Kirov (released)

=== Pirin Blagoevgrad ===
In:

No.	Pos.	Nation	Player
1	GK	BUL	Martin Minev (from Vitosha Bistritsa)
6	MF	BUL	Kostadin Dyakov (from Slavia Sofia)
8	MF	BUL	Daniel Genov (from Botev Plovdiv)
9	MF	BUL	Daniel Mladenov (from Septemvri Simitli)

Out:

No.	Pos.	Nation	Player
1	GK	BUL	Nikolay Bankov (to Dobrudzha Dobrich)
8	MF	BUL	Antonio Hadzhiivanov (to Lokomotiv Mezdra)
22	DF	BUL	Bogomil Dyakov (to Spartak Pleven)
26	MF	BUL	Aleksandar Yakimov (to Belasitsa Petrich)
—	FW	BUL	Smail Kreboliev (on loan to Septemvri Simitli, previously on loan at Pirin GD)

=== Slavia Sofia ===
In:

No.	Pos.	Nation	Player
4	DF	RUS	Nikita Sergeyev (from (Russia) Volga Tver)
7	MF	BUL	Borislav Baldzhiyski (from Montana)
9	FW	FRA	Donnell Moukanza (from (Czech Republic) Zbrojovka Brno)
17	MF	BUL	Georg Iliev (Free agent)
20	FW	RUS	Serder Serderov (from (Russia) Anzhi Makhachkala)
66	DF	KEN	Aboud Omar (from (Greece) Panegialios)

Out:

No.	Pos.	Nation	Player
5	MF	CMR	Franck Mbarga (to (Turkey) 1461 Trabzon)
6	DF	BUL	Zhivko Atanasov (to (Italy) Juve Stabia)
7	MF	FRA	Jérémy Manzorro (on loan to (Cyprus) Anorthosis)
9	FW	FRA	Mathieu Manset (to (France) Consolat Marseille)
17	MF	BUL	Kostadin Dyakov (to Pirin Blagoevgrad)
20	FW	BUL	Petar Atanasov (on loan to Montana)
35	MF	BUL	Ivan Valchanov (to Cherno More)
66	DF	BUL	Plamen Krachunov (to (Scotland) St Johnstone)
71	MF	BUL	Anton Karachanakov (to (Poland) Cracovia)
—	DF	CTA	Fernander Kassaï (to (Kazakhstan) Tobol, previously on loan at (Kazakhstan) Irtysh)
—	MF	POR	Carlos Fonseca (to (Kazakhstan) Irtysh, previously on loan)

== B Group ==
=== Bansko ===
In:

No.	Pos.	Nation	Player
1	GK	BUL	Mario Atanasov (from Pirin Razlog)
8	MF	BUL	Petar Lazarov (from Pirin Razlog)
9	MF	BUL	Milen Lefterov (from Pirin Razlog)
13	DF	BUL	Blagoy Rodov (from Pirin Razlog)
15	MF	BUL	Hristo Kirev (from Spartak Pleven)
19	FW	BUL	Andriyan Dimitrov (from CSKA Sofia U17)
20	MF	BUL	Antonio Laskov (from Vihren Sandanski)
22	DF	BUL	Iliya Munin (from Litex Lovech)
23	MF	BUL	Kostadin Katsimerski (from Septemvri Simitli)

Out:

No.	Pos.	Nation	Player
1	GK	BUL	Bozhidar Stoychev (released)
5	MF	BUL	Yordan Yordanov (to Pavlikeni)
8	MF	BUL	Ruslan Ivanov (to (Greece) Episkopi)
13	DF	BUL	Dimitar Vezalov (to (Poland) Zagłębie Sosnowiec)
16	FW	BUL	Tsvetan Pavlov (released)
17	MF	BUL	Yanislav Ivanov (to Dunav Ruse)
22	DF	BUL	Nikolay Dichev (to CSKA Sofia)

=== Botev Galabovo ===
In:

No.	Pos.	Nation	Player
3	DF	BUL	Yanko Valkanov (from (Kazakhstan) Akzhayik)
6	MF	BUL	Steliyan Evtimov (from Zagorets Nova Zagora)
18	MF	BUL	Valchan Chanev (from Neftochimic Burgas)
70	FW	BUL	Lyubomir Aleksandrov (from Svilengrad)

Out:

No.	Pos.	Nation	Player
11	MF	BUL	Stoyan Dikov (retired)
77	DF	BUL	Atanas Krastev (to Svilengrad)

=== Dobrudzha Dobrich ===
In:

No.	Pos.	Nation	Player
1	GK	BUL	Zlati Zlatev (on loan from Cherno More U19)
2	DF	BUL	Stefan Ivanov (on loan from Cherno More U19)
3	DF	BUL	Vladimir Aytov (from Botev Plovdiv)
7	MF	BUL	Nikolay Minkov (on loan from Cherno More U19)
9	FW	BUL	Georgi Stanchev (from Kaliakra Kavarna)
10	MF	BUL	Hristiyan Kazakov (from Botev Plovdiv)
12	GK	BUL	Nikolay Bankov (from Pirin Blagoevgrad)
18	MF	BUL	Vladislav Uzunov (from CSKA Sofia)
31	MF	BUL	Aleksandar Popov (from Kaliakra Kavarna)
89	DF	BUL	Georgi Kupenov (on loan from Botev Plovdiv)

Out:

No.	Pos.	Nation	Player
1	GK	BUL	Pavel Petkov (to Lokomotiv GO)
3	DF	BUL	Mladen Dimitrov (released)
7	MF	BUL	Pavel Petkov (released)
10	MF	BUL	Galin Dimov (to Nesebar)
12	GK	BUL	Dimitar Iliev (to Neftochimic Burgas)
14	DF	BUL	Daniel Genov (to Botev Vratsa)
18	MF	BUL	Petko Tsankov (to Chernomorets Balchik)
31	DF	BUL	Nikolay Iliev (released)
83	MF	BUL	Emil Koparanov (released)
89	DF	BUL	Simeon Ivanov (to Neftochimic Burgas)

=== Dunav Ruse ===
In:

No.	Pos.	Nation	Player
23	MF	BUL	Angel Zdravchev (from Litex Lovech)
70	MF	BUL	Anton Ognyanov (from Beroe Stara Zagora)
88	MF	BUL	Yanislav Ivanov (from Bansko)

Out:

No.	Pos.	Nation	Player
17	MF	BUL	Deyan Lozev (to Pomorie)

=== Litex Lovech II ===
In:

No.	Pos.	Nation	Player

Out:

No.	Pos.	Nation	Player
5	DF	BUL	Martin Mitov (on loan to Lokomotiv Mezdra)
13	DF	BUL	Galin Minkov (on loan to Lokomotiv Mezdra)
14	DF	BUL	Emil Petrov (on loan to Lokomotiv Mezdra)

=== Lokomotiv GO ===
In:

No.	Pos.	Nation	Player
7	MF	BUL	Simeon Mechev (from Neftochimic Burgas)
19	FW	TUN	Aymen Souda (from (Tunisia) Kasserine)
33	GK	BUL	Pavel Petkov (from Dobrudzha Dobrich)
39	FW	BUL	Dimitar Aleksiev (from Botev Plovdiv)
91	MF	BUL	Erik Pochanski (from Ludogorets Razgrad II)

Out:

No.	Pos.	Nation	Player
7	MF	BUL	Martin Raynov (to Lokomotiv Plovdiv)
9	FW	BUL	Nikolay Ivanov (released)
33	GK	BUL	Ivan Hristov (to Akademik Svishtov)
44	MF	BUL	Emil Kamberov (loan return to Botev Plovdiv)
80	MF	BUL	Sava Savov (released)

=== Lokomotiv 2012 Mezdra ===
In:

No.	Pos.	Nation	Player
1	GK	BUL	Yordan Krastev (Free agent)
2	DF	BUL	Martin Mitov (on loan from Litex Lovech II)
3	DF	BUL	Emil Petrov (on loan from Litex Lovech II)
6	DF	BUL	Georgi Georgiev (from Botev Vratsa)
8	DF	BUL	Evgeni Tuntev (from Pirin Razlog)
9	FW	BUL	Vladislav Zlatinov (Free agent)
10	FW	BUL	Georgi Mirchev (from Germaneya Sapareva Banya)
11	MF	BUL	Antonio Hadzhiivanov (from Pirin Blagoevgrad)
13	DF	BUL	Galin Minkov (on loan from Litex Lovech II)
14	MF	BUL	Zlatko Bonev (from Ludogorets Razgrad II)
15	DF	BUL	Petar Zlatinov (Free agent)
17	FW	BUL	Georgi Kaloyanov (from Pirin Razlog)
19	MF	BUL	Manol Chapov (Free agent)
20	FW	CGO	Arsène Luboya (from (Belgium) Royal Géants Athois)
23	DF	BUL	Lyubomir Hristov (from Pirin Razlog)
33	GK	BUL	Ivaylo Krusharski (Free agent)
44	MF	BUL	Denis Tsolev (Free agent)
88	MF	GHA	Michael Tawiah (from (Serbia) Borac Čačak)
89	GK	BUL	Nikolay Krastev (on loan from Levski Sofia)
92	MF	MLI	Abdoulaye Coulibaly (from (Luxembourg) Pétange)

Out:

No.	Pos.	Nation	Player
1	GK	BUL	Ivan Ivanov (to Botev Vratsa)
4	DF	BUL	Ivan Skerlev (to Etar Veliko Tarnovo)
6	DF	BUL	Nikolay Hristozov (retired)
7	MF	BUL	Denil Seliminski (released)
10	MF	BUL	Ivan Mishev (released)
11	DF	BUL	Aleksandar Mihaylov (released)
12	GK	BUL	Ivaylo Varganov (to Botev Kozloduy)
13	DF	BUL	Petar Vasilev (to Pirin Razlog)
14	MF	BUL	Ivaylo Tsvetanov (to Botev Vratsa)
15	DF	BUL	Georgi Pavlov (to Botev Vratsa)
16	MF	BUL	Daniel Vasev (to Spartak Pleven)
22	MF	BUL	Georgi Stoichkov (to Pirin Razlog)
23	FW	BUL	Georgi Kakalov (to (Turkey) Ergene Velimeşe)
77	MF	BUL	Kiril Georgiev (to Septemvri Simitli)
88	MF	BUL	Petar Dimitrov (to Etar Veliko Tarnovo)
99	FW	BUL	Todor Chavorski (to Botev Vratsa)

=== Ludogorets Razgrad II ===
In:

No.	Pos.	Nation	Player
99	DF	BUL	Kristiyan Grigorov (from Spartak Pleven)

Out:

No.	Pos.	Nation	Player
23	DF	BUL	Aleksandar Georgiev (on loan to Karnobat)
45	MF	BUL	Zlatko Bonev (to Lokomotiv Mezdra)
70	MF	BUL	Erik Pochanski (to Lokomotiv GO)
96	DF	BUL	Dimitar Todorov (to Lokomotiv Sofia)

=== Neftochimic Burgas ===
In:

No.	Pos.	Nation	Player
5	DF	BUL	Simeon Ivanov (from Dobrudzha Dobrich)
7	MF	BUL	Vladislav Misyak (from Levski Sofia)
8	MF	BUL	Teodor Stefanov (Free agent)
9	FW	BUL	Iliya Dimitrov (on loan from Levski Sofia)
18	DF	BUL	Miroslav Koev (from Sozopol)
20	MF	BUL	Daniel Kostov (from Chernomorets Burgas)
21	MF	BUL	Daniel Gadzhev (Free agent)
27	DF	BUL	Slavi Shopov (from Karnobat)
44	GK	BUL	Dimitar Iliev (from Dobrudzha Dobrich)
77	MF	BUL	Tsvetan Filipov (from (England) Weston-super-Mare)

Out:

No.	Pos.	Nation	Player
5	DF	BUL	Velichko Velichkov (to (Maldives) New Radiant)
7	MF	BUL	Lyubomir Lyubenov (to Septemvri Simitli)
8	MF	BUL	Dimitar Georgiev (to Pirin Razlog)
9	MF	BUL	Andon Gushterov (to Septemvri Simitli)
10	MF	BUL	Simeon Mechev (to Lokomotiv GO)
13	MF	BUL	Emil Rachev (to Rozova Dolina)
21	FW	BUL	Ivelin Vasilev (to Dorostol)
44	GK	BUL	Yordan Gospodinov (released)
77	MF	BUL	Valchan Chanev (to Botev Galabovo)
88	MF	BUL	Simeon Baev (to Nesebar)
90	GK	BUL	Kostadin Georgiev (to Apolonia Sozopol)

=== Oborishte ===
In:

No.	Pos.	Nation	Player
6	DF	BUL	Hristo Stamov (from Lokomotiv Plovdiv)
9	MF	BUL	Ilian Hristov (from Septemvri Simitli)
10	MF	BUL	Shaban Osmanov (from Asenovets)
19	FW	BUL	Dimitar Dimitrov (from Pirin Razlog)
20	MF	ENG	Andrew Musungu (Free agent)
77	FW	BUL	Hristiyan Vasilev (from Shumen 1929)
88	GK	BUL	Ventsislav Dimitrov (from Akademik Svishtov)
90	MF	BUL	Antonio Tsankov (from Maritsa Plovdiv)

Out:

No.	Pos.	Nation	Player
5	DF	BUL	Martin Vasilev (to Botev Ihtiman)
6	DF	BUL	Ahmed Ademov (to Pirin Gotse Delchev)
7	FW	BUL	Vladimir Kaptiev (to Septemvri Simitli)
9	FW	BUL	Grigor Dolapchiev (to Spartak Pleven)
10	MF	BUL	Hristo Gogovski (to (Portugal) Barreirense)
15	MF	NGA	Salas Okechukwu (to Botev Ihtiman)
31	GK	BUL	Krastyo Krastev (to Lokomotiv Plovdiv U19)

=== Pirin Razlog ===
In:

No.	Pos.	Nation	Player
2	DF	BUL	Stoyan Predev (from Septemvri Sofia)
4	DF	BUL	Marin Georgiev (from Vihren Sandanski)
5	DF	BUL	Petar Genchev (from Septemvri Sofia)
7	FW	BUL	Rangel Ignatov (on loan from Botev Plovdiv)
8	MF	BUL	Daniel Pehlivanov (from Vihren Sandanski)
9	MF	BUL	Asen Chandarov (from Septemvri Sofia)
10	FW	BUL	Bozhidar Katsarov (from Zagorets Nova Zagora)
11	DF	BUL	Asparuh Smilkov (from Septemvri Sofia)
12	GK	BUL	Emil Petrov (from Septemvri Sofia)
13	DF	BUL	Petar Vasilev (from Lokomotiv Mezdra)
15	MF	BUL	Petar Tonchev (from Septemvri Sofia)
16	MF	BUL	Dimitar Georgiev (from Neftochimic Burgas)
20	FW	BUL	Kostadin Adzhov (from Rilski Sportist)
21	DF	BUL	Vasil Dobrev (from Septemvri Sofia)
99	MF	BUL	Georgi Stoichkov (from Lokomotiv Mezdra)

Out:

No.	Pos.	Nation	Player
3	FW	BUL	Boris Kondev (released)
4	MF	BUL	Dzheyhan Zaydenov (to Septemvri Simitli)
5	DF	BUL	Evgeni Tuntev (to Lokomotiv Mezdra)
6	MF	BUL	Krasimir Drunchilov (released)
7	MF	BUL	Nikolay Hadzhinikolov (to Septemvri Simitli)
9	FW	BUL	Viktor Shishkov (to (Greece) Episkopi)
11	MF	BUL	Milen Lefterov (to Bansko)
12	GK	BUL	Mario Atanasov (to Bansko)
13	MF	BUL	Nikolay Radanov (end of contract)
14	FW	BUL	Georgi Kaloyanov (to Lokomotiv Mezdra)
16	MF	BUL	Petar Lazarov (to Bansko)
18	DF	BUL	Lyubomir Hristov (to Lokomotiv Mezdra)
19	FW	BUL	Dimitar Dimitrov (to Oborishte)
20	DF	BUL	Blagoy Rodov (to Bansko)
21	MF	BUL	Nikolay Dimirov (released)

=== Pomorie ===
In:

No.	Pos.	Nation	Player
11	MF	BUL	Deyan Lozev (from Dunav Ruse)

Out:

No.	Pos.	Nation	Player
22	MF	BUL	Slavcho Shokolarov (released)

=== Septemvri Simitli ===
In:

No.	Pos.	Nation	Player
1	GK	BUL	Dimitar Pangev (from Vihren Sandanski)
3	DF	BUL	Georgi Peychev (from Spartak Pleven)
4	MF	BUL	Dzheyhan Zaydenov (from Pirin Razlog)
8	FW	BUL	Vladimir Kaptiev (from Oborishte)
9	MF	BUL	Andon Gushterov (from Neftochimic Burgas)
10	MF	BUL	Stoyko Ivanov (from Pirin Gotse Delchev)
11	MF	BUL	Lyubomir Lyubenov (from Neftochimic Burgas)
14	FW	CIV	Franck Koré (from (France) JA Drancy)
17	MF	BUL	Kiril Georgiev (from Lokomotiv Mezdra)
18	FW	BUL	Smail Kreboliev (on loan from Pirin Blagoevgrad)
19	FW	BUL	Deyan Hristov (from Vereya)
20	MF	BUL	Nikolay Hadzhinikolov (from Pirin Razlog)
27	DF	BUL	Borislav Sandev (from Pirin Gotse Delchev)
87	FW	BUL	Ibrahim Alim (from Pirin Gotse Delchev)
96	DF	BUL	Valeri Georgiev (Free agent)

Out:

No.	Pos.	Nation	Player
1	GK	BUL	Stanislav Karadaliev (released)
3	DF	BUL	Lyubomir Iliev (to Botev Vratsa)
4	DF	BUL	Radoslav Bachev (released)
9	FW	BUL	Veselin Stoykov (to Strumska Slava)
11	MF	BUL	Kostadin Katsimerski (to Bansko)
12	GK	BUL	Abdi Abdikov (released)
14	MF	SRB	Nikola Radulović (released)
16	MF	BUL	Dimitar Petkov (to (Cyprus) Elpida Xylofagou)
17	DF	BUL	Kostadin Markov (released)
19	FW	BUL	Metodi Kostov (to Vereya)
27	DF	BUL	Radoslav Mitrevski (to Minyor Pernik)
29	MF	BUL	Ilian Hristov (to Oborishte)
87	MF	BUL	Daniel Mladenov (to Pirin Blagoevgrad)

=== Sozopol ===
In:

No.	Pos.	Nation	Player
26	MF	BUL	Yacub Idrizov (from Vereya)
96	FW	BUL	Kristiyan Tafradzhiyski (on loan from Litex Lovech)

Out:

No.	Pos.	Nation	Player
26	FW	BUL	Petar Kolev (to Karnobat)
90	DF	BUL	Miroslav Koev (to Neftochimic Burgas)

=== Spartak Pleven ===
In:

No.	Pos.	Nation	Player
2	DF	BUL	Mario Dimitrov (from (Germany) Pritzwalker FHV)
3	DF	BUL	Teodor Mihaylov (from Levski 2007)
4	DF	BUL	Iliyan Garov (from Septemvri Sofia)
5	DF	BUL	Tsvetelin Radev (from Vereya)
7	MF	BUL	Daniel Vasev (from Lokomotiv Mezdra)
8	MF	BUL	Nikola Mitsanski (from Botev Vratsa)
11	MF	BUL	Ivaylo Dangurov (from Akademik Svishtov)
17	MF	BUL	Ivo Ivanov (from CSKA Sofia)
19	DF	BUL	Bogomil Dyakov (from Pirin Blagoevgrad)
30	MF	BUL	Dimo Atanasov (from Vereya)
45	FW	BUL	Grigor Dolapchiev (from Oborishte)
89	GK	BUL	Hristo Matev (from Bdin Vidin)

Out:

No.	Pos.	Nation	Player
2	MF	BUL	Nikolay Botev (released)
3	DF	BUL	Zhivko Gospodinov (released)
4	DF	BUL	Georgi Peychev (to Septemvri Simitli)
5	DF	BUL	Kristiyan Grigorov (to Ludogorets Razgrad II)
6	MF	BUL	Antoni Ivanov (released)
7	MF	BUL	Plamen Iliev (released)
8	MF	BUL	Bogomil Hristov (released)
9	FW	BUL	Stefan Hristov (to Etar Veliko Tarnovo)
10	MF	BUL	Vasil Shopov (to Litex Lovech)
11	MF	BUL	Hristo Kirev (to Bansko)
12	DF	BUL	Plamen Tenev (loan return to Beroe Stara Zagora)
16	MF	BUL	Ivan Dyankov (released)
18	MF	BUL	Zhyulien Benkov (to Etar Veliko Tarnovo)
94	GK	BUL	Marin Orlinov (loan return to Litex Lovech)

=== Vereya ===
In:

No.	Pos.	Nation	Player
4	DF	BUL	Plamen Tenev (on loan from Beroe Stara Zagora)
6	MF	BUL	Kiril Lichev (on loan from Beroe Stara Zagora)
14	MF	BUL	Hristian Popov (from Montana)
18	MF	BUL	Peycho Enchev (from Svilengrad)
22	GK	CGO	Christoffer Mafoumbi (from (France) Le Pontet)
39	FW	BUL	Metodi Kostov (from Septemvri Simitli)
99	FW	BUL	Angel Kostov (loan return from Rozova Dolina)
—	FW	FRA	Amadou Soukouna (from (France) Toulouse)

Out:

No.	Pos.	Nation	Player
4	MF	BUL	Dimo Atanasov (to Spartak Pleven)
6	MF	BUL	Yacub Idrizov (to Sozopol)
12	GK	BUL	Emil Danchev (released)
16	DF	BUL	Kostadin Stoyanov (released)
18	FW	BUL	Deyan Hristov (to Septemvri Simitli)
39	MF	BUL	Nikolay Petrov (to Sofia 2010)
73	FW	BUL	Ivan Stoyanov (to Montana)
