= Ivaylo Petrov =

Ivaylo Petrov may refer to:

- Ivailo Petrov (1923-2005), a Bulgarian writer
- Ivaylo Petrov (footballer born 1973), retired Bulgarian footballer who played for CSKA Sofia
- Ivaylo Petrov (footballer born 1991), Bulgarian footballer for Svetkavitsa
