= Ivaylo (name) =

Ivaylo or Ivailo (Bulgarian: Ивайло) is a masculine name of Bulgarian origin, often given in reference to the medieval leader Ivaylo of Bulgaria. The name is likely derived from the Bulgarian name Vulo, meaning "wolf." Ivaylo may refer to:

- Ivaylo Kirov (born 1965), Bulgarian association football player
- Ivaylo Markov (born 1997), Bulgarian footballer
- Ivaylo Petkov (born 1976), Bulgarian footballer
- Ivaylo Rusev (born 1987), Bulgarian footballer
- Ivaylo Todorov
- Ivaylo Haralampiev
- Ivaylo Loubomerov
- Ivaylo Tsachev
- Ivaylo Hadjiev
