= Uchikov =

Uchikov is a surname. Notable people with the surname include:

- Nikolay Uchikov (born 1986), Bulgarian volleyball player
- Stefan Uchikov (born 1976), Bulgarian footballer
