= Yani Pehlivanov =

Bulgarian footballer

Personal information
- Full name: Yani Dimitrov Pehlivanov
- Date of birth: 14 July 1988 (age 38)
- Place of birth: Burgas, Bulgaria
- Height: 1.82 m (6 ft 0 in)
- Positions: Centre midfielder; centre back

Team information
- Current team: Spartak Pleven
- Number: 19

Youth career
- Naftex Burgas

Senior career*
Years	Team	Apps	(Gls)
2005–2006	Naftex Burgas	0	(0)
2006–2010	Chernomorets Pomorie	30	(4)
2011–2014	Chernomorets Burgas	45	(4)
2014	PFC Burgas	7	(0)
2015	Chernomorets Burgas	11	(0)
2015–2016	Pomorie	28	(3)
2016–2017	Neftochimic	21	(0)
2017–2023	Etar	127	(6)
2023–	Spartak Pleven	86	(11)
- * Club domestic league appearances and goals as of 11 June 2026

Yani Pehlivanov (Bulgarian: Яни Пехливанов; born 14 July 1988) is a Bulgarian professional footballer who plays as a defender for Spartak Pleven.

== Career ==
Pehlivanov began his career at Chernomorets Pomorie. In January 2011 he joined Chernomorets Burgas. He made his A PFG debut on 5 May against Montana.

On 16 June 2017, Pehlivanov signed a 1-year contract with Etar.

== Career statistics ==
As of 12 November 2011

Club	Season	League		Cup		Europe		Total	
Club	Season	Apps	Goals	Apps	Goals	Apps	Goals	Apps	Goals
Chernomorets Pomorie	2009–10	20	4	5	1	—		25	5
Chernomorets Pomorie	2010–11	10	0	1	0	—		11	0
Chernomorets Pomorie	Total	30	4	6	1	0	0	36	5
Chernomorets Burgas	2010–11	6	0	0	0	—		6	0
Chernomorets Burgas	2011–12	6	0	0	0	—		6	0
Chernomorets Burgas	Total	12	0	0	0	0	0	12	0
Career total		42	4	6	1	0	0	48	5
