= Martin Dimitrov (footballer, born 1987) =

Bulgarian football midfielder

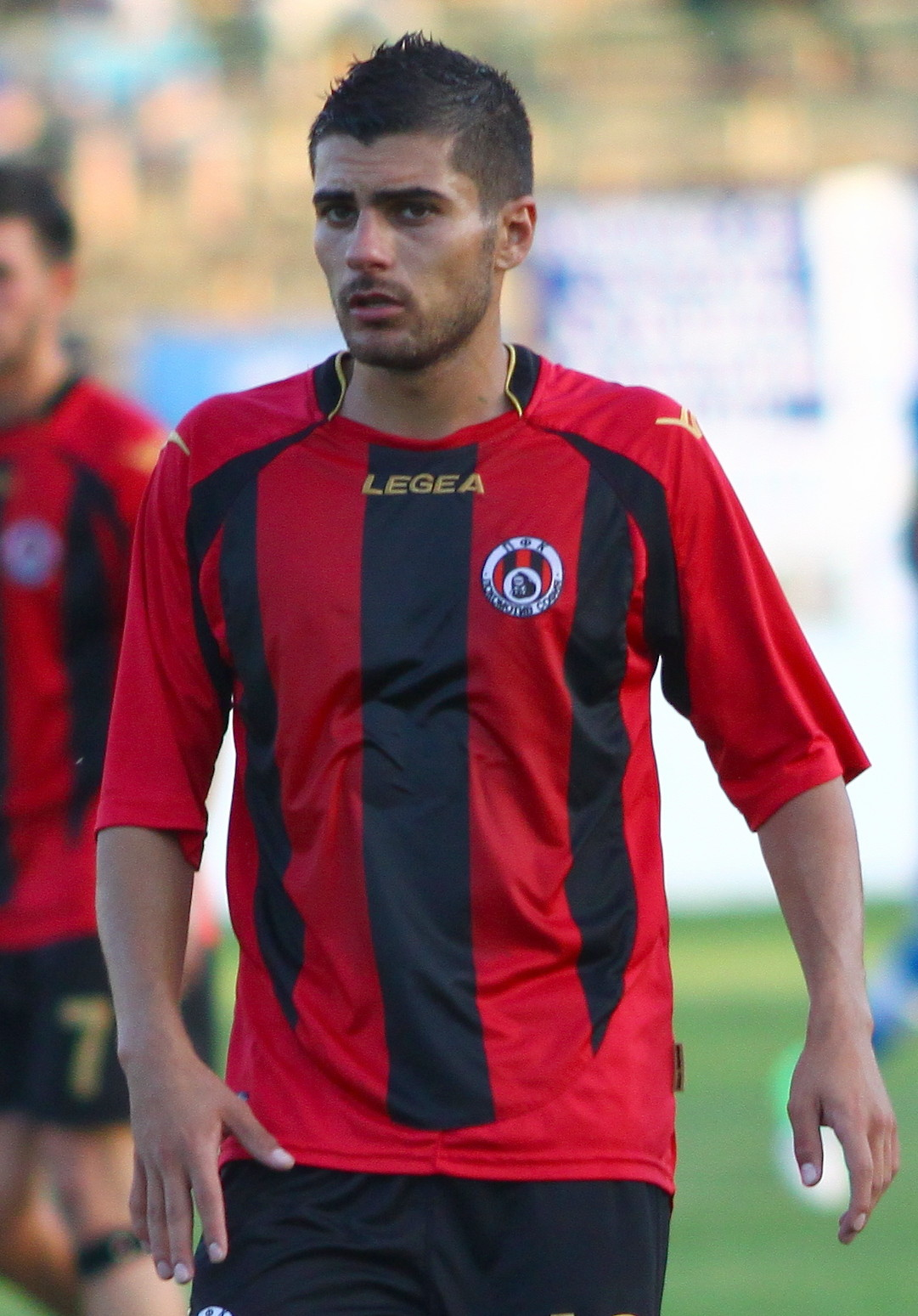
- Dimitrov in 2012

Personal information
- Full name: Martin Borisov Dimitrov
- Date of birth: 17 July 1987 (age 39)
- Place of birth: Bulgaria
- Height: 1.80 m (5 ft 11 in)
- Position: Midfielder

Senior career*
Years	Team	Apps	(Gls)
2008–2010	Nesebar	41	(0)
2010–2011	Chernomorets Pomorie	23	(0)
2012–2013	Lokomotiv Sofia	39	(0)
2014	Master Burgas	?	(?)
2014–2015	Marek Dupnitsa	29	(0)
2015	Septemvri Sofia	12	(0)
2016	Lokomotiv 1929 Sofia	7	(0)
- * Club domestic league appearances and goals as of 8 May 2016

Martin Borisov Dimitrov (Bulgarian: Мартин Борисов Димитров; born 17 July 1987) is a Bulgarian former footballer who played as a midfielder.

== Career ==
Between summer 2008 and autumn 2010, Dimitrov played for Nesebar.

He joined Chernomorets Pomorie on a two-year deal in January 2011.

In January 2012, he went on trial with Lokomotiv Sofia.

In February 2014, he signed for third-tier club Master Burgas.

He signed for newly promoted Parva Liga club Marek Dupnitsa in June 2014. He suffered an ankle injury in September 2014, leaving him unavailable for a month.
