= Dimitar Georgiev =

Bulgarian footballer

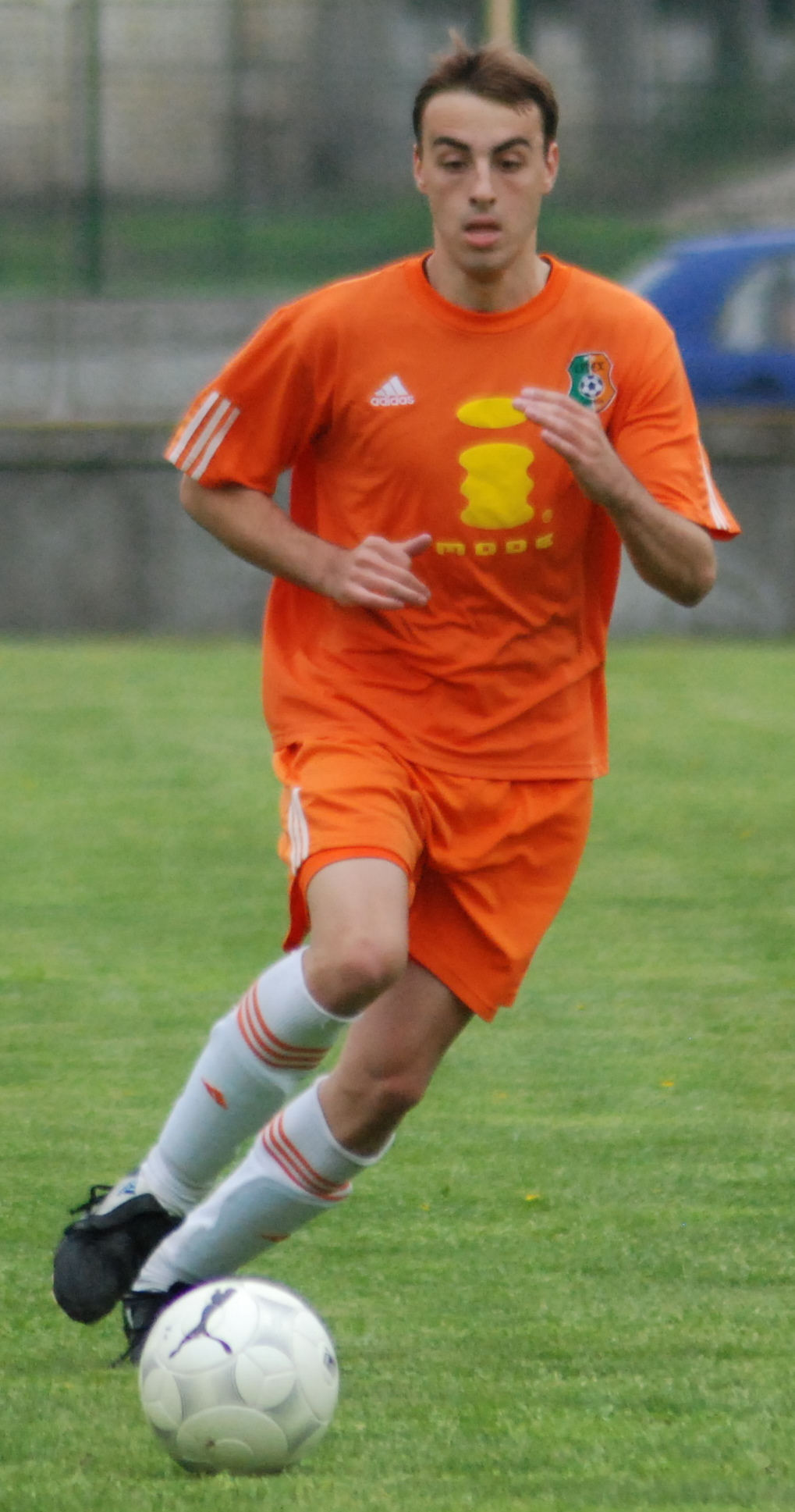
- Georgiev with Litex Lovech in 2010

Personal information
- Full name: Dimitar Georgiev Georgiev
- Date of birth: 9 February 1992 (age 34)
- Place of birth: Bulgaria
- Height: 1.81 m (5 ft 11 in)
- Positions: Winger; forward

Youth career
- 1998–2009: Septemvri Sofia
- 2009–2011: Litex

Senior career*
Years	Team	Apps	(Gls)
2010–2012	Litex	1	(0)
2011–2012	→ Botev Vratsa (loan)	0	(0)
2012–2014	Marek	53	(12)
2014	Slavia Sofia	5	(0)
2015	Burgas	11	(2)
2015	Neftochimic	15	(5)
2016	Pirin Razlog	12	(2)
2016–2017	Lokomotiv Sofia	28	(18)
2017–2018	Dunav Ruse	19	(0)
2018–2019	Montana	13	(0)
2019	→ Kariana (loan)	12	(3)
2019–2020	Lokomotiv Sofia	14	(3)
2020	Strumska Slava	0	(0)
2020	Drenovets	?	(?)
- * Club domestic league appearances and goals as of 20 September 2021

Dimitar Georgiev (Bulgarian: Димитър Георгиев; born 9 February 1992) is a Bulgarian footballer who plays as a forward.

== Career ==
He made his A PFG debut for Litex on 16 May 2010 against Sportist Svoge on the last day of the season, coming on as a substitute for Momchil Tsvetanov. On 14 June 2011, he signed his first professional contract with Litex. On 6 July, Dimitrov signed for Botev Vratsa on a season-long loan deal.

On 16 June 2017, Georgiev signed a 2-year contract with Dunav Ruse. In June 2018, he moved to Montana.

== Career statistics ==
=== Club ===
As of 1 June 2017

Club	Season	Division	League		Cup		Europe		Total	
Club	Season	Division	Apps	Goals	Apps	Goals	Apps	Goals	Apps	Goals
Litex Lovech	2009–10	A Group	1	0	0	0	0	0	1	0
Litex Lovech	2010–11	A Group	0	0	0	0	0	0	0	0
Botev Vratsa	2011–12	A Group	0	0	0	0	–		0	0
Marek Dupnitsa	2012–13	V Group	28	8	0	0	–		28	8
Marek Dupnitsa	2013–14	B Group	25	4	1	0	–		26	4
Slavia Sofia	2014–15	A Group	5	0	0	0	–		5	0
Burgas	2014–15	B Group	11	2	0	0	–		11	2
Neftochimic Burgas	2015–16	B Group	15	5	0	0	–		15	5
Pirin Razlog	2015–16	B Group	12	2	0	0	–		12	2
Lokomotiv Sofia	2016–17	Second League	28	18	2	1	–		30	19
Total	Bulgaria		125	39	3	1	0	0	128	40
