= Asen Georgiev =

Bulgarian footballer

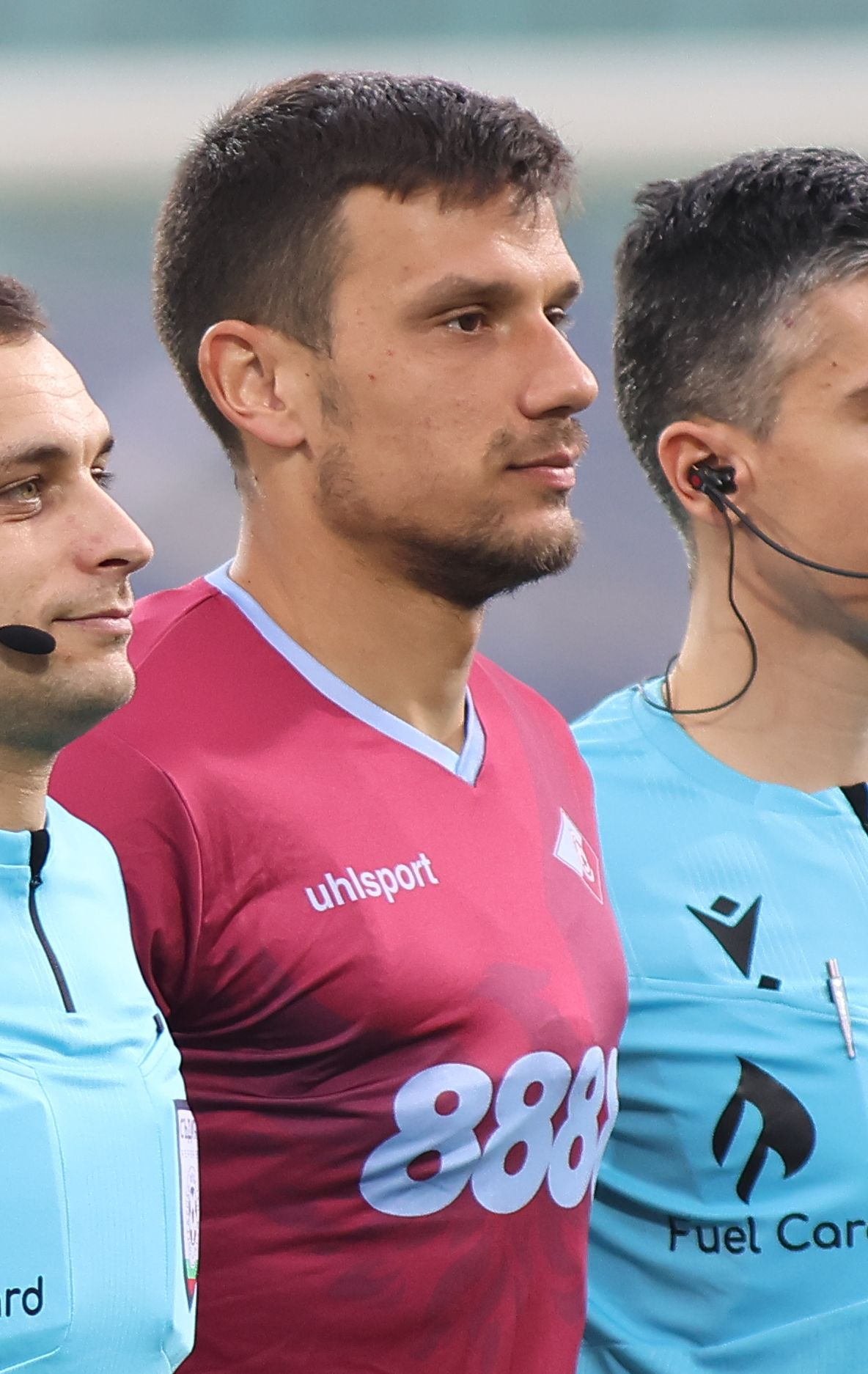

Personal information
- Full name: Asen Kirilov Georgiev
- Date of birth: 9 July 1993 (age 33)
- Place of birth: Sofia, Bulgaria
- Height: 1.86 m (6 ft 1 in)
- Position: Centre-back

Team information
- Current team: Yantra Gabrovo
- Number: 5

Youth career
- Levski Sofia

Senior career*
Years	Team	Apps	(Gls)
2010–2012	Levski Sofia	0	(0)
2012–2013	Botev Vratsa	15	(0)
2013–2014	Lokomotiv Plovdiv	26	(0)
2014–2016	Montana	60	(6)
2016	Istra 1961	17	(0)
2017	Beroe	13	(1)
2017–2019	Lokomotiv Plovdiv	28	(1)
2019–2020	Hebar	13	(5)
2020–2024	Septemvri Sofia	121	(12)
2024	Etar Veliko Tarnovo	3	(0)
2024–2025	CSKA 1948 II	23	(3)
2024–2025	CSKA 1948	7	(0)
2025–	Yantra Gabrovo	31	(1)

International career
2011	Bulgaria U19	1	(0)
2012–2013	Bulgaria U21	8	(0)
- * Club domestic league appearances and goals as of 25 May 2026

Asen Georgiev (Bulgarian: Асен Георгиев; born 9 July 1993) is a Bulgarian professional footballer who plays as a defender for Yantra Gabrovo.

== Career ==
Georgiev started his career at Levski Sofia. In September 2010, he was named on the bench for Levski in their Europa League game against K.A.A. Gent.

On 4 July 2012, Georgiev joined Botev Vratsa. He made his A Group debut in a 4–0 away loss against Beroe Stara Zagora on 11 August.

On 3 February 2017, Georgiev signed with Beroe Stara Zagora. On 31 July 2017, his contract was terminated by mutual consent.

On 11 August 2017, Georgiev signed a two-year contract with Lokomotiv Plovdiv.

In July 2020, he became part of the ranks of Septemvri Sofia.

== Career statistics ==
As of 29 May 2016

Club performance			League		Cup		Continental		Other		Total	
Club	League	Season	Apps	Goals	Apps	Goals	Apps	Goals	Apps	Goals	Apps	Goals
Bulgaria			League		Bulgarian Cup		Europe		Other (Note: Includes Bulgarian Supercup matches.)		Total	
Levski Sofia	A Group	2010–11	0	0	0	0	0	0	–		0	0
Levski Sofia	A Group	2011–12	0	0	0	0	0	0	–		0	0
Levski Sofia	Total		0	0	0	0	0	0	0	0	0	0
Botev Vratsa	A Group	2012–13	15	0	0	0	–		–		15	0
Botev Vratsa	Total		15	0	0	0	0	0	0	0	15	0
Lokomotiv Plovdiv	A Group	2013–14	26	0	5	0	–		–		31	0
Lokomotiv Plovdiv	Total		26	0	5	0	0	0	0	0	31	0
Montana	B Group	2014–15	27	4	3	0	–		–		30	4
Montana	A Group	2015–16	33	2	6	0	–		–		39	2
Montana	Total		60	6	9	0	0	0	0	0	69	6
Career statistics			101	6	14	0	0	0	0	0	115	6

== Honours ==
=== Club ===
Lokomotiv Plovdiv

- Bulgarian Cup: 2018–19
