= Raycho Raev =

Bulgarian footballer

Personal information
- Full name: Raycho Zhelyazkov Raev
- Date of birth: 24 May 1984 (age 42)
- Place of birth: Burgas, Bulgaria
- Position: Forward

Team information
- Current team: Karnobat

Senior career*
Years	Team	Apps	(Gls)
2001–2005	Chernomorets Burgas	33	(3)
2005	Sliven 2000	10	(4)
2006	Zagorets	7	(0)
2006–2007	Chernomorets Sofia	15	(0)
2008–2009	Fostiras	22	(9)
2009–2010	Bansko	12	(0)
2010–2011	Lyubimets 2007	20	(3)
2012–2014	Master Burgas	20	(10)
2014–	Karnobat	23	(1)
- * Club domestic league appearances and goals as of 21 April 2016

Raycho Raev (Bulgarian: Райчо Раев; born 24 May 1984) is a Bulgarian football forward who currently plays for FC Karnobat.

== Career ==
Raev previously played for FC Chernomorets Burgas in the A PFG during the 2003–04 season.
