= Yuri Ivanov (footballer, born 1982) =

Bulgarian footballer

Personal information
- Full name: Yuri Ivanov Ivanov
- Date of birth: 5 July 1982 (age 44)
- Place of birth: Sandanski, Bulgaria
- Height: 1.80 m (5 ft 11 in)
- Position: Right-back

Team information
- Current team: PFC Burgas
- Number: 20

Youth career
- Levski Sofia

Senior career*
Years	Team	Apps	(Gls)
2003–2007	Vihren Sandanski	47	(1)
2007–2008	Lokomotiv Mezdra	22	(0)
2008–2009	Spartak Varna	41	(0)
2010	Minyor Pernik	4	(0)
2011	Vihren Sandanski	16	(0)
2011–2014	Neftochimic Burgas	71	(0)
2014–	PFC Burgas	11	(0)
- * Club domestic league appearances and goals as of 1 December 2014

Yuri Ivanov (Bulgarian Cyrillic: Юри Иванов; born 5 July 1982) is a Bulgarian footballer who plays as a right defender for PFC Burgas.

== Career ==
He had previously played for Vihren Sandanski, Lokomotiv Mezdra and Spartak Varna.

== Awards ==
- Champion of B PFG 2013 (with Neftochimic Burgas)
