= Stefan Traykov =

Bulgarian footballer

Personal information
- Full name: Stefan Georgiev Traykov
- Date of birth: 9 July 1976 (age 50)
- Place of birth: Svishtov, Bulgaria
- Height: 1.77 m (5 ft 10 in)
- Position: Midfielder

Team information
- Current team: FC Yantra (Tsenovo) (manager)

Youth career
- 1987–1994: Akademik Svishtov

Senior career*
Years	Team	Apps	(Gls)
1994–1996	Akademik Svishtov	?	(?)
1996–1997	Benkovski Byala	?	(?)
1997–1998	Etar	25	(5)
1998–2004	Chernomorets Burgas	109	(5)
2004–2005	Marek Dupnitsa	19	(0)
2005–2009	Chernomorets Burgas	70	(0)
2009–2010	Ravda	?	(?)
2010–2013	Master Burgas	?	(?)
2014	Akademik Svishtov	10	(0)
2014	Chernomorets Burgas	10	(0)
2015–2016	Akademik Svishtov	?	(?)
2016–2018	Chernomorets Burgas	?	(?)
2019	Akademik Svishtov	0	(0)
2020–2021	Yantra Polski Trambesh	?	(?)
2021–2022	Akademik Svishtov	33	(0)
2022–2023	Juventus Malchika	?	(?)

Managerial career
- 2019: Akademik Svishtov
- 2025–: FC Yantra (Tsenovo)
- * Club domestic league appearances and goals as of 10 December 2014

Stefan Traykov (Bulgarian: Стефан Трайков; born 9 July 1976) is a Bulgarian footballer, who currently plays as a midfielder for Juventus Malchika.

== Career ==
Traykov was raised in Akademik Svishtov's youth teams. In his career he played also for Etar Veliko Tarnovo, Chernomorets Burgas, Marek Dupnitsa and Ravda 1954.
