= Stanislav Dryanov =

Bulgarian footballer

Personal information
- Full name: Stanislav Toshkov Dryanov
- Date of birth: 4 February 1995 (age 31)
- Place of birth: Burgas, Bulgaria
- Height: 1.77 m (5 ft 9 1/2 in)
- Position: Midfielder

Team information
- Current team: Chernomorets Burgas
- Number: 17

Youth career
- Neftochimic Burgas
- 2009–2013: Chernomorets Burgas

Senior career*
| Years | Team | Apps | (Gls) |
| 2012–2014 | Chernomorets Burgas | 23 | (0) |
| 2014–2015 | Botev Plovdiv | 9 | (0) |
| 2015–2016 | Neftochimic | 19 | (1) |
| 2016 | Beroe | 2 | (0) |
| 2017–2018 | Pomorie | 21 | (0) |
| 2018– | Chernomorets Burgas | 0 | (0) |

International career
| 2011–2012 | Bulgaria U17 | 6 | (1) |
| 2012–2014 | Bulgaria U19 | 10 | (1) |
| 2014 | Bulgaria U21 | 2 | (0) |
- * Club domestic league appearances and goals as of 26 May 2018

Stanislav Dryanov (Bulgarian: Станислав Дрянов; born 4 February 1995) is a Bulgarian footballer who plays as a midfielder for Chernomorets Burgas.

== Career ==
=== Chernomorets Burgas ===
He made his A PFG debut on 5 October 2012 against Botev Vratsa.

=== Botev Plovdiv ===
Stanislav Dryanov signed a contract with Botev Plovdiv in June 2014. After his excellent performances for Botev Plovdiv U21 against the U21 teams of Lokomotiv Plovdiv and CSKA Sofia Dryanov came on as a substitute for the first team of Botev Plovdiv during the 3–1 defeat from Lokomotiv Sofia in the 12th round of A Grupa.

On 7 December Dryanov came on as a substitute and played during the final 10 minutes of the 2–0 win over PFC Haskovo. On 15 March 2015 Dryanov participated in the final minutes during the important 2–0 home win of Botev Plovdiv over CSKA Sofia.

On 3 May Dryanov came on as a substitute during the 1–3 defeat from Ludogorets Razgrad and in the 80th minute missed out a clear opportunity to score. He also came on during the second halves of the next two rounds of A grupa: defeat from Litex Lovech, on 11 May, and 3–2 victory from CSKA Sofia, on 16 May. On 23 May Dryanov was included in the starting lineup for the away derby game against Beroe Stara Zagora and remained on the pitch until the 85th minute when he was replaced by Hristiyan Kazakov.

On 22 July 2015 Stanislav Dryanov was released from Botev Plovdiv on a free transfer.

=== Neftochimic Burgas ===
On 25 July Stanislav Dryanov signed а one-year contract with PFC Neftochimic Burgas.

=== Pomorie ===
On 24 January 2017, Dryanov signed with Pomorie.

== Club statistics ==
As of 1 July 2016

| Club performance | | | League | | Cup | | Continental | | Other | | Total | |
| Club | League | Season | Apps | Goals | Apps | Goals | Apps | Goals | Apps | Goals | Apps | Goals |
| Bulgaria | | | League | | CCB Cup | | Europe | | Other (Note: Includes Bulgarian Supercup matches.) | | Total | |
|---|---|---|---|---|---|---|---|---|---|---|---|---|
| Chernomorets Burgas | A Group | 2012–13 | 12 | 0 | 1 | 0 | – | | – | | 13 | 0 |
| Chernomorets Burgas | A Group | 2013–14 | 11 | 0 | 2 | 1 | – | | – | | 13 | 1 |
| Chernomorets Burgas | Total | | 23 | 0 | 3 | 1 | 0 | 0 | 0 | 0 | 26 | 1 |
| Botev Plovdiv | A Group | 2014–15 | 9 | 0 | 0 | 0 | 0 | 0 | 0 | 0 | 9 | 0 |
| Botev Plovdiv | Total | | 9 | 0 | 0 | 0 | 0 | 0 | 0 | 0 | 9 | 0 |
| Neftochimic Burgas | B Group | 2015–16 | 19 | 1 | 0 | 0 | – | | – | | 19 | 1 |
| Neftochimic Burgas | Total | | 19 | 1 | 0 | 0 | 0 | 0 | 0 | 0 | 19 | 1 |
| Beroe Stara Zagora | First League | 2016–17 | 0 | 0 | 0 | 0 | 1 | 0 | – | | 1 | 0 |
| Beroe Stara Zagora | Total | | 0 | 0 | 0 | 0 | 1 | 0 | 0 | 0 | 1 | 0 |
| Career Total | | | 51 | 1 | 3 | 1 | 1 | 0 | 0 | 0 | 55 | 2 |
