= Vasil Tachev =

Bulgarian footballer

Personal information
- Full name: Васил Стоянов Тачев
- Date of birth: 7 January 1992 (age 34)
- Place of birth: Petrich, Bulgaria
- Height: 1.83 m (6 ft 0 in)
- Position: Striker

Team information
- Current team: Oborishte
- Number: 72

Senior career*
| Years | Team | Apps | (Gls) |
| 2010–2011 | Cherno More | 1 | (0) |
| 2011–2013 | Dobrudzha Dobrich | 41 | (22) |
| 2014 | Master Burgas | 13 | (9) |
| 2014 | Chernomorets Balchik | 12 | (15) |
| 2015 | Sozopol | 12 | (3) |
| 2015–2016 | Chernomorets Balchik | 25 | (24) |
| 2016–2017 | Oborishte | 24 | (4) |
| 2017 | Kariana | 15 | (14) |
| 2018 | Belasitsa Petrich | 32 | (19) |
| 2019– | Oborishte | 28 | (15) |
- * Club domestic league appearances and goals as of 1 June 2020

Vasil Tachev (Bulgarian: Васил Тачев; born 7 January 1992) is a Bulgarian footballer who plays as a striker for Oborishte Panagyurishte.

== Career ==
During the 2012–13 season, Tachev scored 18 goals in the North-East V AFG, the third division of Bulgarian football.

On 2 July 2017, Tachev joined Belasitsa Petrich but signed with Kariana a few weeks later.
