= Antonio Tsankov =

Bulgarian footballer

Personal information
- Full name: Antonio Radomirov Tsankov
- Date of birth: 7 February 1990 (age 36)
- Place of birth: Bulgaria
- Height: 1.78 m (5 ft 10 in)
- Positions: Left-back; winger

Team information
- Current team: Oborishte
- Number: 90

Senior career*
Years	Team	Apps	(Gls)
2008–2010	Maritsa Plovdiv		
2011–2012	Rakovski		
2013–2014	Lokomotiv Sofia	16	(0)
2014	Rakovski	8	(0)
2015	Oborishte	3	(0)
2015	Minyor Chicago	4	(6)
2015	Maritsa Plovdiv	6	(1)
2016	Oborishte	12	(2)
2016	Pirin Gotse Delchev		
2017–2019	Oborishte	3	(0)
- * Club domestic league appearances and goals as of 31 May 2017

Antonio Tsankov (Bulgarian: Антонио Цанков; born 7 February 1990) is a Bulgarian footballer who plays as a midfielder for Oborishte Panagyurishte.

== Career ==
On 8 October 2016, Tsankov joined Pirin Gotse Delchev but returned to Oborishte in January 2017.
