= Ivaylo Petrov (footballer, born 1991) =

Bulgarian footballer

Personal information
- Full name: Ivaylo Ivanov Petrov
- Date of birth: 23 January 1991 (age 35)
- Place of birth: Sliven, Bulgaria
- Height: 1.71 m (5 ft 7 1/2 in)
- Position: Midfielder

Team information
- Current team: Nesebar

Youth career
- 2000–2007: Sliven 2000

Senior career*
Years	Team	Apps	(Gls)
2007–2010	Sliven 2000	29	(4)
2010	Svetkavitsa	14	(2)
2011–2012	Sliven 2000	22	(4)
2012	Svetkavitsa	9	(0)
2013	Nesebar	?	(?)
2014	Master Burgas	?	(?)
2014	Chernomorets Burgas	12	(1)
2015–	Nesebar	0	(0)
- * Club domestic league appearances and goals as of 22 June 2015

Ivaylo Petrov (born 23 January 1991) is a Bulgarian footballer who currently plays as an attacking midfielder for Nesebar.
