= Antonio Hadzhiivanov =

Bulgarian footballer

Personal information
- Full name: Antonio Georgiev Hadzhiivanov
- Date of birth: 16 January 1990 (age 36)
- Place of birth: Blagoevgrad, Bulgaria
- Height: 1.85 m (6 ft 1 in)
- Position: Midfielder

Youth career
- 2001–2008: Pirin 2001

Senior career*
Years	Team	Apps	(Gls)
2008–2009	Pirin 2001	31	(8)
2009–2010	Beroe Stara Zagora	12	(1)
2011	Pirin Razlog	?	(?)
2012–2015	Pirin Blagoevgrad	85	(15)
2016	Lokomotiv Mezdra	6	(1)
2016	Tsarsko Selo	8	(0)
2019	THOI Lakatamia	3	(0)
- * Club domestic league appearances and goals as of 3 June 2019

Antonio Hadzhiivanov (Bulgarian: Антонио Хаджииванов; born 16 January 1990 in Blagoevgrad) is a Bulgarian footballer currently playing as a midfielder for Tsarsko Selo Sofia.

== Career ==
A Pirin 2001 youth product, Hadzhiivanov was farmed to Beroe Stara Zagora at A PFG in June 2009. Antonio has made his debut for Beroe in a match against CSKA Sofia on 15 August 2009 as an 81st-minute substitute.

In December 2016, Hadzhiivanov was released by Tsarsko Selo for hitting a teammate during training.
