= Georgi Stanchev =

Bulgarian footballer

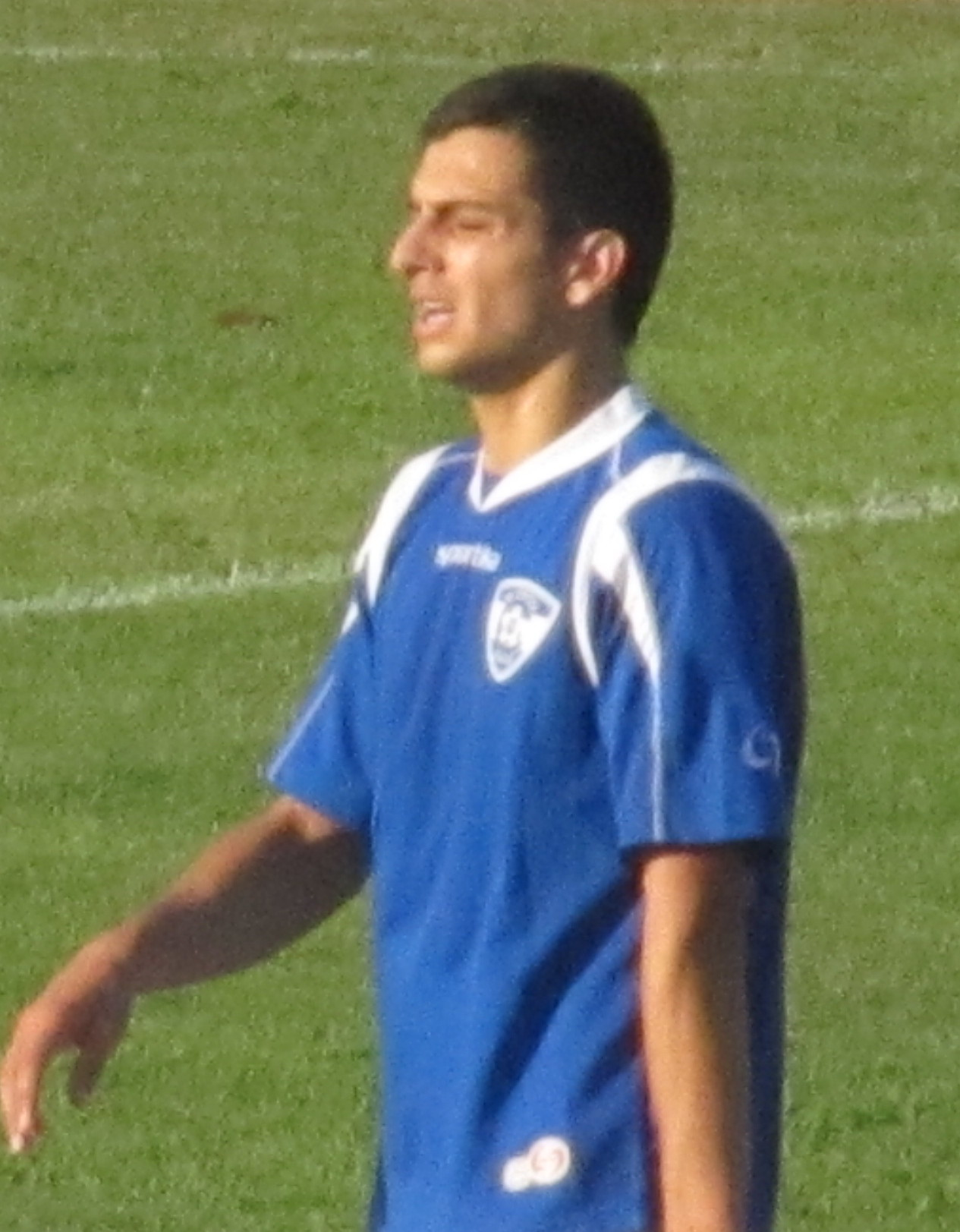

Personal information
- Full name: Georgi Emilov Stanchev
- Date of birth: 27 August 1985 (age 41)
- Place of birth: Varna, Bulgaria
- Height: 1.85 m (6 ft 1 in)
- Position: Forward

Team information
- Current team: Suvorovo

Youth career
- 1996–2004: Spartak Varna

Senior career*
Years	Team	Apps	(Gls)
2005–2011	Kaliakra Kavarna	126	(17)
2011–2012	Spartak Varna	21	(4)
2013–2014	Kaliakra Kavarna	18	(4)
2014	PFC Burgas	12	(1)
2015	Kaliakra Kavarna	22	(11)
2016–2017	Dobrudzha Dobrich	10	(1)
2017–2018	Kaliakra Kavarna	?	(?)
2018–2019	Suvorovo	?	(?)
2019–2020	Kaliakra Kavarna	?	(2)
2020–	Suvorovo	?	(?)
- * Club domestic league appearances and goals as of 29 March 2022

Georgi Stanchev (Bulgarian: Георги Станчев; born 27 August 1985, in Varna) is a Bulgarian football striker currently playing for Suvorovo.

== Career ==
Stanchev was raised in Spartak Varna's youth teams, but in 2004 signed his first professional contract with Kaliakra Kavarna.

== Club statistics ==
As of 1 June 2011

Club	Season	League		Cup		Europe		Total	
Club	Season	Apps	Goals	Apps	Goals	Apps	Goals	Apps	Goals
Kaliakra Kavarna	2005–06	18	5	0	0	–	–	18	5
Kaliakra Kavarna	2006–07	19	3	1	0	–	–	20	3
Kaliakra Kavarna	2007–08	20	5	5	1	–	–	25	6
Kaliakra Kavarna	2008–09	25	1	0	0	–	–	25	1
Kaliakra Kavarna	2009–10	21	2	3	0	–	–	24	2
Kaliakra Kavarna	2010–11	23	1	1	0	–	–	24	1
Career totals		126	17	9	1	0	0	135	18
