= Stefan Uchikov =

Bulgarian footballer

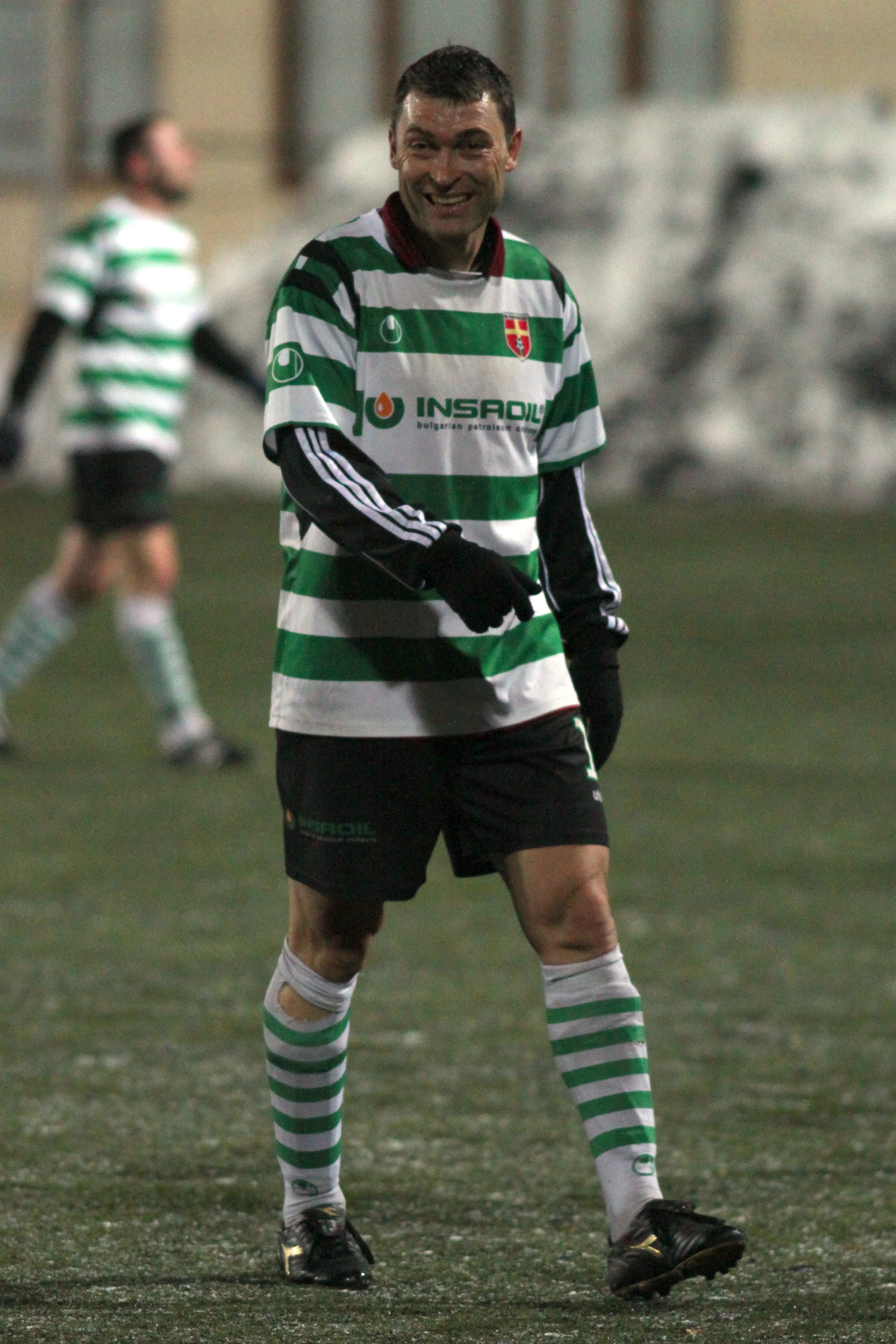

Personal information
- Date of birth: 22 January 1976 (age 50)
- Place of birth: Sopot, Bulgaria
- Height: 1.83 m (6 ft 0 in)
- Position: Midfielder

Team information
- Current team: Spartak Plovdiv (head coach)

Youth career
- Metalik Sopot

Senior career*
Years	Team	Apps	(Gls)
1993–1996	Metalik Sopot	64	(20)
1996–1999	Botev Plovdiv	63	(10)
1999–2003	Lokomotiv Sofia	90	(9)
2003–2005	Rodopa Smolyan	51	(5)
2005–2006	Thyella Patras	27	(8)
2006–2007	Rodopa Smolyan	26	(0)
2008–2010	Maritsa Plovdiv	45	(5)
2010	Botev Plovdiv	5	(0)
2011–2012	Rakovski	?	(?)
2014	Rakovski	9	(1)
2015	Spartak Plovdiv	0	(0)
2016–2017	Levski Karlovo	5	(0)
- * Club domestic league appearances and goals

Stefan Uchikov (Bulgarian: Стефан Учиков; born on 22 January 1976) is a Bulgarian former footballer who last played as a midfielder for Levski Karlovo.

== Career ==
During his career Uchikov has played for a number of teams, including Metalik Sopot, Botev Plovdiv, Lokomotiv Sofia and Maritsa Plovdiv.
