= Kostadin Dyakov =

Bulgarian footballer

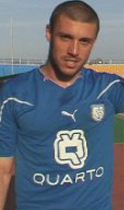

Personal information
- Full name: Kostadin Hristov Dyakov
- Date of birth: 22 August 1985 (age 41)
- Place of birth: Plovdiv, Bulgaria
- Height: 1.77 m (5 ft 10 in)
- Position: Defensive midfielder

Senior career*
Years	Team	Apps	(Gls)
2004–2007	Levski Sofia	0	(0)
2005	→ Vihren Sandanski (loan)	6	(0)
2005–2007	→ Rodopa Smolyan (loan)	36	(1)
2007–2012	Chernomorets Burgas	76	(8)
2012–2013	Botev Plovdiv	29	(0)
2014	Master Burgas	12	(0)
2014–2015	Slavia Sofia	36	(0)
2016	Pirin Blagoevgrad	13	(0)
2016–2017	Montana	23	(1)
2017–2019	Maritsa Plovdiv	49	(2)
2019	Oborishte	11	(1)
2020	Maritsa Plovdiv		
- * Club domestic league appearances and goals

Kostadin Dyakov (Bulgarian: Костадин Дяков; born 22 August 1985) is a Bulgarian former footballer who played as a midfielder.

== Career ==
He was raised in Levski Sofia's youth teams. After that he played as a loaned footballer for Vihren Sandanski and Rodopa Smolyan. He signed than with Chernomorets Burgas in June 2007 on free transfer from Levski Sofia and joined on 8 October 2009 for a trial to FC Schalke 04.

On 14 July 2016, Dyakov signed with Montana. He left the club in June 2017 when his contract expired.

On 5 September 2017, Dyakov signed with Second League club Maritsa Plovdiv.

=== Position ===
Dyakov plays as a right or defensive midfielder.
