= 2014–15 B Group =

Bulgarian B Group
- Season: 2014–15
- Promoted: Montana; Pirin Blagoevgrad
- Relegated: Botev Vratsa; Chernomorets; Rakovski; Spartak Varna
- Matches played: 239
- Goals scored: 586 (2.45 per match)
- Top goalscorer: Yanaki Smirnov (22 goals)

The 2014–15 B Group was the 59th season of the Bulgarian B Football Group, the second tier of the Bulgarian football league system.

== Team changes from 2013–14 ==
=== Movement between A PFG and B PFG ===
At the end of last season the first two teams of the second division of Bulgarian football were promoted to the top division - A PFG. These were Marek Dupnitsa and Haskovo 2009.

Because of the changes made in the number of teams in A PFG for this season the bottom four teams in A Group at the end of the last one were relegated to B Group for season 2014–2015. These were Chernomorets Burgas, Neftochimic Burgas, Pirin Gotse Delchev and Lyubimets 2007.

=== Movement between B PFG and V AFG ===
The four V AFG champions - Sozopol (South-East), Benkovski Byala (North-East), Pirin Blagoevgrad (South-West) and Lokomotiv Mezdra (North-West) - were promoted to B PFG because of their standings in their respective groups the previous season.

=== Further pre-season changes ===
On June 16 Benkovski Byala sent an official letter to the Bulgarian Football Union and declined to participate in the 2014–15 B PFG, citing financial problems. On the next day media reports suggested that three additional clubs had not met the license criteria in the initial investigation by the BFU - Lyubimets, Neftochimic and Pirin Gotse Delchev. All three clubs were in danger of being refused a spot in the group, while the 2nd placed teams in the 2013/14 V AFG were preparing themselves to make bids to replace them.

On June 19 the BFU confirmed Benkovski's withdrawal and officially invited FC Master Burgas to take their spot as the 2nd placed team in the Southeast V AFG. On June 22, the club announced it had accepted the invitation, and in addition would change its name to FC Burgas and switch colours from red and white to blue and white. On June 30, the BFU announced the final list of participants for the 2014–15 season after a six-hour session. Lyubimets, Neftochimic and Pirin Gotse Delchev were all denied a professional license for the following season due to outstanding debts and would have to compete in the V AFG or fold. The group was kept at 16 teams with the addition of Lokomotiv Gorna Oryahovitsa (2nd place in Northwest V AFG), Septemvri Simitli (2nd place in Southwest V AFG) and Vereya Stara Zagora (3rd place in Southeast V AFG). Vereya was chosen ahead of Oborishte Panagyurishte (3rd placed in Southwest V AFG) because of its higher coefficient and better infrastructure.

== Stadia and locations ==
Location of teams in B PFG 2014–15

Team	City	Stadium	Capacity
Bansko	Bansko	Saint Peter	3,000
Botev	Galabovo	Energetik	3,000
Botev	Vratsa	Hristo Botev	32,000
Burgas	Burgas	Balgarovo	3,000
Chernomorets	Burgas	Lazur	18,037
Dobrudzha	Dobrich	Druzhba	12,500
Lokomotiv	Gorna Oryahovitsa	Lokomotiv	12,000
Lokomotiv 2012	Mezdra	Lokomotiv	5,000
Montana	Montana	Ogosta	8,000
Pirin	Blagoevgrad	Hristo Botev	11,000
Pirin	Razlog	Pirin	2,000
Rakovski	Rakovski	Legia	3,000
Septemvri	Simitli	Struma	8,000
Sozopol	Sozopol	Arena Sozopol	3,000
Spartak	Varna	Spartak	8,000
Vereya	Stara Zagora	Trace Arena	1,000

== League table ==
Pos	Team	Pld	W	D	L	GF	GA	GD	Pts	Promotion or relegation
1	Montana (C, P)	30	25	3	2	72	16	+56	78	Promotion to 2015–16 A Group
2	Pirin Blagoevgrad (P)	30	17	10	3	52	15	+37	61	Promotion to 2015–16 A Group
3	Lokomotiv Gorna Oryahovitsa	30	18	5	7	60	34	+26	59	
4	Bansko	30	14	11	5	38	18	+20	53	
5	Dobrudzha Dobrich	30	13	7	10	41	28	+13	46	
6	Sozopol	30	12	10	8	39	25	+14	46	
7	Burgas	30	11	10	9	34	30	+4	43	
8	Botev Galabovo	30	11	9	10	35	40	−5	42	
9	Lokomotiv 2012 Mezdra	30	12	5	13	43	41	+2	41	
10	Pirin Razlog	30	10	10	10	33	38	−5	40	
11	Vereya	30	9	10	11	25	24	+1	37	
12	Septemvri Simitli	30	11	3	16	30	47	−17	36	
13	Botev Vratsa (R)	30	8	5	17	26	43	−17	29	Relegation to 2015–16 V Group
14	Chernomorets Burgas (R)	30	7	7	16	25	40	−15	28	Relegation to 2015–16 V Group
15	Rakovski 2011 (R)	29	6	1	22	25	71	−46	16 (Note: Rakovski 2011 decided to cancel their participation in the championship during the winter break due to financial difficulties. They were unable to register four professional players for their matches against Burgas and Botev Galabovo. All remaining fixtures are awarded 0−3 against them. The decision was confirmed by the Bulgarian Football Union on 27 February 2015. On 5 March 2015 the Union deducted 3 points due to the non-attendance of their game against PFC Burgas.)	Relegation to 2015–16 V Group
16	Spartak Varna (R)	29	2	0	27	9	77	−68	6 (Note: Spartal Varna decided to cancel their participation in the championship during the winter break due to financial difficulties. They were unable to register four professional players for their match against Bansko, which was the second time a match had to be cancelled due to a fault of Spartak Varna. All remaining fixtures are awarded 0−3 against them. The decision was confirmed by the Bulgarian Football Union on 5 March 2015.)	Relegation to 2015–16 V Group

Source: bulgarian-football.com
Rules for classification: 1st points; 2nd head-to-head points; 3rd head-to-head goal difference; 4th head-to-head goals scored; 5th goal difference; 6th number of goals scored; 7th Fair-play points; 8th Draw
(C) Champions; (P) Promoted; (R) Relegated

== Results ==
Home \ Away	BAN	GAL	BVR	BUR	CHB	DOB	LGO	LM12	MON	PIR	PRZ	RAK	SIM	SOZ	SPV	VER
Bansko		2–0	4–0	2–1	2–0	2–1	1–0	1–1	2–0	1–0	1–1	3–0 (Note: Match awarded)	2–0	0–0	3–0	0–0
Botev Galabovo	0–0		1–1	0–0	1–0	2–1	1–2	2–0	1–3	1–1	2–2	4–2	1–0	1–0	1–0	1–0
Botev Vratsa	0–1	1–0		1–0	0–2	0–1	0–3	1–0	1–4	0–1	0–0	3–0	3–1	0–1	5–0	0–0
Burgas	1–1	1–1	2–0		0–0	3–2	1–1	2–2	1–2	0–0	1–1	3–0	1–0	1–1	3–0	0–0
Chernomorets Burgas	1–1	1–1	1–0	0–2		2–1	1–3	1–2	1–2	0–2	2–1	3–0	1–1	1–1	2–1	0–1
Dobrudzha Dobrich	0–2	0–0	2–2	1–0	4–2		3–4	2–1	0–1	2–1	0–1	2–0	3–0	2–0	3–0	1–0
Lokomotiv Gorna Oryahovitsa	2–2	4–2	3–2	2–1	2–0	1–1		1–2	1–3	1–2	1–2	3–0	2–0	4–3	3–0	0–0
Lokomotiv 2012 Mezdra	1–0	0–4	4–0	1–3	2–0	0–1	0–4		1–2	1–1	4–2	3–0	3–1	0–0	2–1	4–1
Montana	3–0	5–0	2–0	1–0	2–0	1–0	2–0	4–0		0–0	3–0	3–3	6–1	2–0	3–0	2–0
Pirin Blagoevgrad	0–0	4–0	2–0	4–0	2–0	1–1	2–0	0–0	2–2		5–0	2–1	3–0	2–1	2–0	1–0
Pirin Razlog	1–1	2–1	0–0	3–1	0–0	0–0	0–1	2–1	0–2	1–0		3–0	2–1	1–2	3–0	0–1
Rakovski 2011	2–0	0–3	3–2	0–1	4–1	0–3	0–3	0–3	0–3	0–3	3–0		3–6	2–0	– (Note: The game between Rakovski 2011 and Spartak Varna is not conducted due to the exclusion of both clubs from B Group)	0–3
Septemvri Simitli	0–0	1–0	1–0	0–1	1–0	1–0	0–3	3–2	1–4	0–3	0–0	3–0		1–0	3–0	2–1
Sozopol	1–0	6–0	0–1	3–1	1–0	0–0	1–1	1–0	1–0	3–3	2–2	3–0	1–0		4–0	0–0
Spartak Varna	0–3	0–3	0–3	1–2	0–3	0–3	0–2	0–3	0–3	0–3	1–2	2–1	1–2	0–3		2–1
Vereya	2–1	1–1	4–0	0–1	0–0	1–1	2–3	1–0	0–2	0–0	2–1	0–1	1–0	0–0	3–0	

Source: bulgarian-football.com
Legend: Blue = home team win; Yellow = draw; Red = away team win.

== Season statistics ==
=== Top scorers ===
Rank	Scorer	Club	Goals
1	(Bulgaria) Yanaki Smirnov	Lokomotiv Gorna Oryahovitsa	22
2	(Bulgaria) Miroslav Antonov	Montana	18
3	(Bulgaria) Atanas Iliev	Dobrudzha Dobrich	17
4	(Bulgaria) Petar Atanasov	Rakovski	13
5	(Bulgaria) Georgi Kirilov	Botev Galabovo	12
6	(Bulgaria) Nikolay Tsvetkov	Lokomotiv 2012 Mezdra	11
7	(Bulgaria) Antoniy Balakov	Lokomotiv Gorna Oryahovitsa	10
8	(Bulgaria) Deyan Hristov	Chernomorets Burgas	9
8	(Bulgaria) Sergey Georgiev	Montana	9
8	(Bulgaria) Martin Toshev	Pirin Blagoevgrad	9
11	(Bulgaria) Vladimir Kaptiev	Pirin Razlog	8

Updated on 24 May 2015
