= Daniel Gramatikov =

Bulgarian footballer

Personal information
- Full name: Daniel Veselinov Gramatikov
- Date of birth: 9 March 1989 (age 37)
- Place of birth: Varna, Bulgaria
- Height: 1.80 m (5 ft 11 in)
- Position: Centre back

Team information
- Current team: Chernomorets Balchik
- Number: 4

Youth career
- 1997–2008: Cherno More

Senior career*
Years	Team	Apps	(Gls)
2008–2010	Cherno More	0	(0)
2008–2010	→ Chernomorets Balchik (loan)	45	(1)
2010–2011	Ludogorets Razgrad	22	(0)
2011	Nesebar	14	(0)
2012	Costuleni	13	(0)
2012–2013	Svetkavitsa	11	(0)
2013–2014	Akademik Svishtov	22	(0)
2014	Lokomotiv Plovdiv	0	(0)
2015–2018	Dobrudzha Dobrich	104	(2)
2019	Chernomorets Balchik	?	(?)
2019–2024	Ustrem Donchevo	?	(?)
- * Club domestic league appearances and goals as of 1 March 2024

Daniel Gramatikov (Bulgarian: Даниел Граматиков; born 9 March 1989) is a Bulgarian footballer who currently plays as a defender for Chernomorets Balchik.
