= Pavel Petkov =

Bulgarian footballer

Personal information
- Full name: Pavel Georgiev Petkov
- Date of birth: 26 June 1990 (age 36)
- Place of birth: Bulgaria
- Height: 1.78 m (5 ft 10 in)
- Position: Winger

Team information
- Current team: Balkan Botevgrad
- Number: 19

Youth career
- Levski Sofia

Senior career*
Years	Team	Apps	(Gls)
2010–2011	Bansko	37	(4)
2012	Lokomotiv Sofia	14	(0)
2013	Botev Vratsa	1	(0)
2013–2014	Bansko	16	(0)
2014	Botev Vratsa	9	(0)
2015	Marek Dupnitsa	7	(0)
2015	Dobrudzha Dobrich	13	(0)
2016	Botev Vratsa	15	(4)
2017–2018	Tsarsko Selo	40	(17)
2019–2020	Septemvri Sofia	13	(1)
2020–2021	Lokomotiv Sofia	13	(1)
2021–	Balkan Botevgrad		

International career
2009	Bulgaria U21	1	(0)
- * Club domestic league appearances and goals as of 20 September 2021

Pavel Petkov (Bulgarian: Павел Петков; born 26 June 1990) is a Bulgarian footballer who plays as a winger for Balkan Botevgrad.

== Career ==
On 5 March 2012, Petkov made his Lokomotiv and A PFG debut in a 2–0 home win over Lokomotiv Plovdiv.

In December 2016, Petkov joined Tsarsko Selo.
