= Hristiyan Kazakov =

Bulgarian footballer (born 1993)

Personal information
- Full name: Hristiqn Georgiev Kazakov
- Date of birth: 10 March 1993 (age 33)
- Place of birth: Plovdiv, Bulgaria
- Height: 1.83 m (6 ft 0 in)
- Position: Midfielder

Team information
- Current team: Minyor Pernik
- Number: 19

Youth career
- –2010: Botev Plovdiv
- 2010–2011: Lyubimets 2007
- 2011–2012: Botev Plovdiv

Senior career*
Years	Team	Apps	(Gls)
2010–2011	Lyubimets 2007	1	(0)
2011–2015	Botev Plovdiv	13	(1)
2012–2014	→ Rakovski (loan)	37	(4)
2016	Dobrudzha	12	(2)
2016–2019	Pomorie	61	(4)
2020	Dobrudzha	13	(3)
2021	Septemvri Sofia	13	(3)
2021–	Minyor Pernik	41	(4)
- * Club domestic league appearances and goals as of 21 September 2022

Hristiyan Kazakov (Bulgarian: Християн Казаков; born 10 March 1993) is a Bulgarian footballer who currently plays for Minyor Pernik as a midfielder.

== Career ==
On 19 October 2014, Kazakov came on as a substitute and made his debut in A Group during the 3–1 defeat against Lokomotiv Sofia. He also participated in the 2–0 win over Panthrakikos F.C. in a friendly game, the 3–0 away defeat from Slavia Sofia in A Grupa and the dramatic home defeat in the derby game with Lokomotiv Plovdiv for that season's Bulgarian Cup.

On 7 December 2014 Kazakov came on as a substitute during the 2–0 win over PFC Haskovo. A week later he came on a substitute again, this time during the 1–0 defeat from Ludogorets Razgrad.

On 2 March 2015 Hristiyan Kazakov scored his first goal for Botev Plovdiv in extra time during the 3–0 win over Marek Dupnitsa. On 10 and 15 March Kazakov participated in the final minutes during the important 0–2 away and 2–0 home victories of Botev Plovdiv over Lokomotiv Plovdiv and CSKA Sofia.

On 23 May Kazakov came on as a late substitute but his efforts were not enough to change the score and Botev Plovdiv lost the away game versus Beroe Stara Zagora with 1–2.

On 30 October Hristiyan Kazakov made his first appearance in season 2015-16 during the 2–0 away defeat from Slavia Sofia.

In January 2016 Kazakov's contract was terminated by mutual agreement and he left Botev Plovdiv.
