= Dimitar Dimitrov (footballer, born 1990) =

Bulgarian footballer

Personal information
- Full name: Dimitar Botyov Dimitrov
- Date of birth: 6 January 1990 (age 36)
- Place of birth: Dupnitsa, Bulgaria
- Position: Forward

Team information
- Current team: Germanea

Youth career
- –2009: CSKA Sofia

Senior career*
Years	Team	Apps	(Gls)
2009–2011	CSKA Sofia	0	(0)
2010	→ Bdin Vidin (loan)	5	(1)
2012–2014	Pirin Razlog	44	(12)
2014–2015	Marek Dupnitsa	21	(1)
2015	Pirin Razlog	17	(3)
2016	Oborishte	3	(0)
2016–	Germanea	0	(0)
- * Club domestic league appearances and goals as of 1 June 2016

Dimitar Botyov Dimitrov (Bulgarian: Димитър Ботьов Димитров; born 6 January 1990) is a Bulgarian footballer, who currently plays as a forward for Germanea.
