= Ivaylo Rusev =

Bulgarian footballer

Personal information
- Date of birth: 19 April 1987 (age 39)
- Place of birth: Bulgaria
- Height: 1.88 m (6 ft 2 in)
- Position: Defender

Senior career*
Years	Team	Apps	(Gls)
2007–2008	Benkovski Byala		
2008–2011	Svetkavitsa	45	(0)
2011–2013	Etar 1924	24	(0)
2013–2014	Spartak 1918	5	(0)
2014–2015	Sozopol	16	(2)
2015	Botev Vratsa	11	(1)
2016	Etar Veliko Tarnovo	10	(0)
- * Club domestic league appearances and goals as of 17:29, 1 March 2017 (UTC)

Ivaylo Rusev (Bulgarian: Ивайло Русев; born 19 April 1987) is a Bulgarian footballer, who plays as a defender.
