= FC Rakovski =

Bulgarian football club

Rakovski
- Full name: SFC Rakovski
- Nickname: The Crusaders
- Founded: 2001; 25 years ago
- Ground: G.S Rakovski, Rakovski
- Capacity: 3,000
- Chairman: Samuil Pazderov
- Manager: Valeri Domovchiyski
- League: Southeast Third League
- 2024-25: A Regional - Plovdiv, 1st (promoted)
Home colours	Away colours

FC Rakovski is a Bulgarian football club based in Rakovski, Plovdiv Province, currently playing in the Southeast Third League, the third tier of Bulgarian football.

Rakovski managed to play three seasons in the second tier of Bulgarian football. In their first season in the second level, 2012–13, the team barely missed out on promotion to the A Group. However, in 2015, Rakovski was relegated.

== History ==
FC Rakovski were founded in 2001. In 2012, Rakovski managed to promote to the B Group, the second tier of Bulgarian football, for the first time in club history. In the 2012–13 season, Rakovski finished in third place after some incredible results, placing three points behind second-placed Lyubimets, who qualified for the A Group. This third-place finish remains the club's highest ever placement in its history. Next season, 2013–14, Rakovski could not replicate the same success, and the team largely fought to avoid relegation, which was ultimately successful. Financial problems started in 2014, and Rakovski was forced to withdraw from the B Group after the winter break of the 2014–15 season. The team fell down to the amateur levels gradually, where it most recently played, the fourth tier.

== Honours ==
South-East V AFG

- Champions: 2011–12
