= PFC Burgas =

- Full name: Professional Football Club Burgas
- Founded: 2009; 16 years ago
- Dissolved: 1 June 2015; 10 years ago become Neftochimic Burgas
- Ground: Balgarovo Stadium, Balgarovo
- Capacity: 3,000
- League: B Group
- 2014–15: B Group, 7th
Home colours	Away colours

Professional Football Club Burgas (Bulgarian: Професионален футболен клуб Бургас) was a Bulgarian association football club based in Burgas. The club was formed in 2009 and was dissolved in 2015 after union with Neftochimic Burgas.

== Club colours ==
Blue	White

=== Kit history ===
Period	Shirt sponsor
2009–2015	Masterhaus

Period	Kit manufacturer
2009–2010	Uhlsport
2010–2011	Jako
2011–2014	Givova
2014–2015	Krasiko

== History ==
=== Master Burgas (2009–2014) ===
The club's logo in the period 2009–2014

The club was founded in 2009 as Football Club Master. In their debut 2010–11 season, they finished first in the Regional Football Group Burgas and qualified for the South-East V AFG promotion playoffs. On June 19, 2011, Master defeated Rodopi Momchilgrad 7–1 to earn promotion to the South-East V AFG.

During the 2011–12 season the team finished 6th in the division, and in the following year barely missed out on promotion by finishing 3rd overall. In season 2013–14 they finished 2nd, after narrowly losing the title race to FC Sozopol. On June 19, 2014, the BFU confirmed Benkovski Byala's withdrawal from the 2014–15 B PFG and officially invited Master Burgas to take their spot as the 2nd placed team in the Southeast V AFG.

=== PFC Burgas (2014–2015) ===
On June 22 the club announced it has accepted the invitation, and in addition will change its name to PFC Burgas and switch colors from red and white to blue and white, similar to the flag of Burgas.

== Honours ==
Bulgarian V Group:

- Runners-up (1): 2013–14

== Historical achievements ==
Master Burgas first kit (2009–2014)

=== Historical names ===
2009–14	FC Master Burgas
2014–15	PFC Burgas

=== Performance by seasons ===
Season	Division	Pos.	Pl.	W	D	L	GS	GA	P	Cup	Notes
2009–10	Regional B Division Burgas	1	28	28	0	0	?	?	84		Promoted
2010–11	Regional A Division Burgas	1	26	24	1	1	89	13	73		Promoted
2011–12	V AFG	6	34	17	8	9	45	34	59		
2012–13	V AFG	3	34	19	10	5	53	25	67	1/16	
2013–14	V AFG	2	32	26	2	4	92	21	80	Preliminary round	Promoted
2014–15	B PFG	7	30	11	10	9	34	30	43	1/16	

== Managers ==
- (Bulgaria) Panayot Gorov (2009–11)
- (Bulgaria) Neno Nenov (2011–13)
- (Bulgaria) Angel Stoykov (2013–14)
- (Bulgaria) Radostin Kishishev (2015)

=== Chairman history ===
Chairman	Nat	From	To
Martin Boshnakov	(Bulgaria)	2009	2014
Rusi Gochev	(Bulgaria)	2014	2015
