= 2010–11 PFC Cherno More Varna season =

Cherno More
2010–11 season
- President: Marin Mitev
- Manager: Stefan Genov
- A Group: 6th
- Bulgarian Cup: Quarter-finals (knocked out by CSKA)
- Top goalscorer: League: Georgi Iliev (9); All: Georgi Iliev (9)
- Highest home attendance: 7,500 vs Levski Sofia (20 Sep 2010)
- Lowest home attendance: 800 vs Montana (8 May 2011)

This page covers all relevant details regarding PFC Cherno More Varna for all official competitions inside the 2010–11 season. These are A PFG and Bulgarian Cup.

== Club ==
Position	Staff
Manager	(Bulgaria) Stefan Genov
Assistant Manager	(Bulgaria) Emanuil Lukanov
Fitness Coach	(Bulgaria) Veselin Markov
Goalkeeping Coach	(Bulgaria) Krasimir Kolev
Doctor	(Turkey) Metin Mutlu
Physios	(Bulgaria) Viktor Bumbalov

Last updated: 18 June

Chairman	(Bulgaria) Marin Mitev
Sporting Director	(Bulgaria) Marin Marinov
Director of Communications	(Bulgaria) Krasimir Nikolov
Director of Recruitment	(Bulgaria) Todor Velikov
Ground (capacity and dimensions)	Ticha Stadium (8,500 / 252m x 191m)

Updated to match played 18 June

== Transfer news ==
On 18 May, Stanislav Stoyanov, who joined the club in the summer of 1999, signed a new one-year contract extension with Cherno More. The midfielder is now linked to the club until June 2011. On 31 May, the Sailors addressed that Beroe's left-winger Doncho Atanasov signed a two-year contract with the club on a free transfer. A two days later the club of Varna announced that defensive midfielder Dimitar Petkov signed a two-year deal from Lokomotiv Mezdra. On 8 June, Cherno More confirmed that Atanas Bornosuzov, midfielder formed at the club, signed a two-year contract with Romanian side Astra Ploieşti on a free transfer. On 14 June, Montana announced the signing of Cherno More Georgi Avramov. A two days later, the Sailors reported that Freamunde defender Marco Tiago who terminated his contract with Portuguese club signed a 24-month contract. On June 28, 2010, Brazilian striker Mário Jardel signed a one-year contract with the Sailors and was officially presented as a new signing of the club.

=== Squad changes ===
In:

No.	Pos.	Nat.	Name	Age	EU	Moving from	Type	Transfer window	Ends	Transfer fee	Source
1	GK	(Bulgaria)	Denchev	21	EU	OFC Sliven	Transfer	Summer	2012	Free	
8	LW	(Bulgaria)	Atanasov	27	EU	Beroe	Transfer	Summer	2012	Free	
9	FW	(Bulgaria)	Budinov	24	EU	Akademik Sofia	Transfer	Summer	2012	Free	
12	LB	(Brazil)	Tiago	26	Non-EU	Freamunde (Portugal)	Transfer	Summer	2012	Free	
16	FW	(Brazil)	Jardel	36	EU		Transfer	Summer	2011	Free	
17	RM	(Bulgaria)	Andreev	19	EU		Loan return	Summer	2012		
19	AM	(Bulgaria)	Kostadinov	23	EU		Loan return	Summer	2012		
24	DM	(Bulgaria)	Petkov	22	EU	Lokomotiv Mezdra	Transfer	Summer	2012	Free	
55	CB	(Bulgaria)	R. Kolev	20	EU		Transfer	Winter	2012	Free	
5	DM	(Brazil)	Camazzola	28	EU	Esportivo (Brazil)	Transfer	Winter	2012	Free	
5	RW	(Bulgaria)	Kaptiev	23	EU		Transfer	Winter	2012	Free	

Total spending: ▼€0

Out:

No.	Pos.	Nat.	Name	Age	EU	Moving to	Type	Transfer window	Transfer fee	Source
1	GK	(Bulgaria)	Ilchev	31	EU	Beroe	Transfer	Summer	Free	
8	DM	(Bulgaria)	Bornosuzov	30	EU	Astra Ploiești (Romania)	Transfer	Summer	Free	
9	FW	(Bulgaria)	Zakov	25	EU	Vidima-Rakovski	Transfer	Summer	Free	
12	GK	(Bulgaria)	Marinov	27	EU		End of contract	Summer	—	
18	RM	(Bulgaria)	Avramov	26	EU	Montana	Transfer	Summer	Free	
84	CB	(Mali)	Coulibaly	26	EU		Released	Summer	—	
5	CB	(Bulgaria)	Domakinov	30	EU	Montana	Released	Winter	Free	
10	DM	(Bulgaria)	Dimov	21	EU	Levski Sofia	Transfer	Winter	€0.2M	
16	FW	(Brazil)	Jardel	37	EU		Released	Winter	Free	
28	RM	(Brazil)	Eli Marques	28	Non-EU	AEL Limassol (Cyprus)	Transfer	Winter	€0.05M	
77	LM	(Bulgaria)	Yurukov	27	EU	Slavia Sofia	Released	Winter	Free	

Total income: ▲€250,000

Last updated: 2010-09-11

== Squad information ==
N	Pos.	Nat.	Name	Age	EU	Since	App	Goals	Ends	Transfer fee	Notes
1	GK	(Bulgaria)	Petar Denchev	22	EU	2010	0	0	2012	Free	
3	LM	(Brazil)	Ademar Júnior	30	Non-EU	2009	16	5	2012	Free	
4	LB	(Bulgaria)	Radoslav Bachev	30	EU	2006	90	2	2012	Free	
5	DM	(Brazil)	Samuel Camazzola	28	EU	2011	0	0	2012	Free	
6	CB	(Bulgaria)	Tanko Dyakov	26	EU	2008	56	2	2012	Free	
7	RM	(Bulgaria)	Stanislav Stoyanov	34	EU	1999	223	8	2011	Free	
8	LW	(Bulgaria)	Doncho Atanasov	28	EU	2010	0	0	2012	Free	
9	LW	(Bulgaria)	Miroslav Budinov	25	EU	2010	0	0	2012	Free	
11	LW	(Bulgaria)	Todor Kolev	21	EU	2006	36	5	2012	Youth system	
12	LB	(Brazil)	Marco Tiago	27	Non-EU	2010	0	0	2012	Free	
13	RW	(Bulgaria)	Ilian Kapitanov	19	EU	2010	1	0	2013	Youth system	
14	FW	(Bulgaria)	Georgi Bozhilov	23	EU	2010	10	3	2012	€0.1M	
15	CB	(Bulgaria)	Aleksandar Aleksandrov	25	EU	2005	96	3	2012	€0.03M	
16	DM	(Bulgaria)	Dimitar Petkov	23	EU	2010	0	0	2012	Free	
17	RM	(Bulgaria)	Yancho Andreev	20	EU	2010	0	0	2012	Youth system	
20	RB	(Bulgaria)	Mihail Lazarov	30	EU	2007	52	2	2011	Free	
21	AM	(Bulgaria)	Georgi Iliev (captain)	29	EU	2008	36	7	2012	€0.1M	
23	AM	(Bulgaria)	Daniel Georgiev	28	EU	2007	83	14	2012	Free	
25	RB	(Bulgaria)	Sasho Aleksandrov	24	EU	2010	10	0	2012	€0.03M	
26	GK	(Bulgaria)	Ilko Pirgov	25	EU	2009	35	0	2012	Free	
27	AM	(Estonia)	Daniil Ratnikov	23	EU	2010	7	1	2012	Free	
31	FW	(Bulgaria)	Miroslav Manolov	26	EU	2007	70	24	2012	Free	
55	CB	(Bulgaria)	Rosen Kolev	20	EU	2012	0	0	2012	Free	
77	FW	(Bulgaria)	Vladimir Kaptiev	23	EU	2011	0	0	2012	Free	
79	GK	(Bulgaria)	Aleksandar Kraev	20	EU	2010	0	0	2012	Youth system	
90	FW	(Bulgaria)	Rumen Nikolov	21	EU	2010	9	1	2012	Youth system	

- Last updated: May 28, 2011

== Matches ==
=== Pre-season ===
30 June 2010 1st friendly	Chernomorets Pomorie	0 – 3	Cherno More	Burgas
18:00 EEST		(Report)	Nikolov 59'; Ademar 71'; Georgiev 79'	Stadium: Chernomorets; Attendance: 100; Referee: Ahmed Ahmed

3 July 2010 2nd friendly	Vidima-Rakovski	0 – 1	Cherno More	Sevlievo
18:00 EEST		(Report)	Yurukov 42' (pen.)	Stadium: Rakovski; Attendance: 150

7 July 2010 3rd friendly	Cherno More	1 – 1	(Azerbaijan) Inter Baku	Bansko
18:30 EEST	Yurukov 16' (pen.)	(Report)	Zhelev 60'	Stadium: Sports Complex Piri; Attendance: 50

10 July 2010 4th friendly	Cherno More	3 – 0	Slavia Sofia	Bansko
11:00 EEST	Tiago 16'; Ademar 18'; Georgiev 58'	(Report)		Stadium: St. Petar; Attendance: 200

14 July 2010 5th friendly	Septemvri Simitli	1 – 1	Cherno More	Simitli
11:00 EEST	Dyulgerov 12'	(Report)	Tiago 88' (pen.)	Stadium: Struma; Attendance: 300; Referee: Stefan Apostolov

17 July 2010 6th friendly	Victoria Brăneşti (Romania)	2 – 2	Cherno More	Brăneşti, Romania
18:30 EEST	Prodan 24'; Simion 36'	(Report)	Dimov 14'; Atanasov 18'	Stadium: Cătălin Hîldan; Attendance: 1,200

21 July 2010 7th friendly	Nesebar	1 – 1	Cherno More	Nesebar
18:30 EEST	Markov 32' (pen.)	(Report)	Atanasov 5'	Stadium: Nesebar; Attendance: 100; Referee: Stefan Pavlov

25 July 2010 8th friendly	Chernomorets Burgas	1 – 0	Cherno More	Burgas
20:30 EEST	Dos Santos 45'	(Report)		Stadium: Lazur; Attendance: 2,500; Referee: Ahmed Ahmed

==== Goalscorers in the pre-season ====
Rank	Nat	Name	Goals
1	(Brazil)	Ademar	2
=	(Bulgaria)	Atanasov	2
=	(Bulgaria)	Georgiev	2
=	(Brazil)	Tiago	2
=	(Bulgaria)	Yurukov	2
6	(Bulgaria)	Dimov	1
=	(Bulgaria)	Nikolov	1

=== Competitive ===
==== A PFG ====
31 July 2010 Round 1	Cherno More	2 – 1	Pirin	Varna
18:00 EEST	Tiago 24'; Atanasov 60'; Dyakov (yellow card); Atanasov (yellow card); A. Aleksandrov (yellow card); D. Petkov (yellow card)	(Report)	Kondev 90+1'; Mitrevski (yellow card); Sandanski (yellow card)	Stadium: Ticha; Attendance: 3,500; Referee: Stefan Spasov

7 Aug 2010 Round 2	Loko Plovdiv	2 – 0	Cherno More	Plovdiv
18:00 EEST	De Carvalho 13' 20'; Kotsev (yellow card) 25'	(Report)	S. Aleksandrov (yellow card) 19'; Dimov (yellow card) 26'; Domakinov (yellow card) 31'; Bozhilov (yellow card) 47'; A. Aleksandrov (yellow card) 60'	Stadium: Lokomotiv; Attendance: 4,000; Referee: Nikolay Yordanov

14 Aug 2010 Round 3	Cherno More	1 – 0	Akademik	Varna
18:30 EEST	Yurukov 34'; Bozhilov (yellow card); Yurukov (yellow card)	(Report)	Redovski (yellow card); Sechkov (yellow card); Petkov (yellow card)	Stadium: Ticha; Attendance: 2,200; Referee: Angel Angelov

22 Aug 2010 Round 4	CSKA	1 – 0	Cherno More	Sofia
21:00 EEST	Marquinhos 76'; Yanchev (yellow card) 61'; Nelson (yellow card) 88'	Report	Georgiev (yellow card) 52'; D. Petkov (yellow card) 67'; Ademar (yellow card) 85'; Atanasov (yellow card) 90'	Stadium: Vasil Levski; Attendance: 1,500; Referee: Ahmed Ahmed

28 Aug 2010 Round 5	Cherno More	0 – 1	Chernomorets	Varna
18:00 EEST	Dimov (yellow card)	Report	Pedrinha 28'; Pedrinha (yellow card)	Stadium: Ticha; Attendance: 3,700; Referee: Georgi Yordanov

11 Sep 2010 Round 6	Vidima-Rakovski	0 – 1	Cherno More	Sevlievo
17:00 EEST	Ashimov (yellow card) 28'; Stankov (yellow card) 31'	Report	Iliev 69'; Dimov (yellow card) 80'; Iliev (yellow card) 85'	Stadium: Rakovski; Attendance: 1,000; Referee: Georgi Kabakov

20 Sep 2010 Round 7	Cherno More	2 – 3	Levski	Varna
16:00 EEST	Bozhilov 49'; Iliev 83'; D. Petkov (yellow card) 29'; Iliev (yellow card) 54'; Aleksandrov (yellow card) 66'; Jardel (yellow card) 78'	Report	Mladenov 22'; Miliev 30'; Dembélé 64' (pen.); Dembélé (yellow card) 11'; Benzoukane (yellow card) 49'	Stadium: Ticha; Attendance: 7,500; Referee: Nikolay Yordanov

26 Sep 2010 Round 8	Cherno More	3 – 0	Sliven	Varna
16:00 EEST	Ivanov 2' (o.g.); Yurukov 51'; Dyakov 70'	Report		Stadium: Ticha; Attendance: 1,700; Referee: Anton Genov

2 Oct 2010 Round 9	Litex	3 – 1	Cherno More	Lovech
21:00 EEST	Yanev 33'; Bodurov 64'; Bratu 88' (pen.); Yanev (yellow card) 6'	Report	Dimov 40'; Dyakov (yellow card) 13'; A. Aleksandrov (yellow card) 63'; Pirgov (yellow card) 87'	Stadium: Lovech; Attendance: 2,500; Referee: Ahmed Ahmed

17 Oct 2010 Round 10	Cherno More	3 – 2	Slavia	Varna
15:00 EEST	Georgiev 4'; Iliev 69'; S. Aleksandrov 89'; Atanasov (yellow card) 58'; Ademar (red card) 80'	Report	Genev 48'; Ivanov 57'; Kikov (yellow card) 40'; Petkov (yellow card) 55'; Ivanov (red card) 80'; Deniran (yellow card) 87' (yellow-red card); Peev (yellow card) 89'	Stadium: Ticha; Attendance: 2,500; Referee: Georgi Yordanov

23 Oct 2010 Round 11	Montana	4 – 0	Cherno More	Montana
15:00 EEST	Michev 6', 65'; Chipilov 43'; Antonov 47'; Michev (yellow card) 37'; Antonov (yellow card) 45'; Lichkov (yellow card) 59'	Report	Tiago (yellow card) 14'; Pirgov (red card) 45'	Stadium: Ogosta; Attendance: 3,000; Referee: Georgi Kabakov

31 Oct 2010 Round 12	Cherno More	1 – 0	Loko Sofia	Varna
15:00 EEST	Jardel 66'; A. Aleksandrov (yellow card) 85'; Nikolov (yellow card) 90'	Report	Savić (yellow card) 84'	Stadium: Ticha; Attendance: 2,800; Referee: Anton Genov

7 Nov 2010 Round 13	Kaliakra	4 – 0	Cherno More	Kavarna
18:00 EEST	Sadula 36', 77'; Petkov 51'; Markov 75'; Petkov (yellow card) 11'; A. Dimitrov (yellow card) 19'; D. Dimitrov (yellow card) 42'	Report	Yurukov (yellow card) 45'; S. Aleksandrov (yellow card) 68'	Stadium: Kavarna; Attendance: 2,200; Referee: Aleksandar Kostadinov

14 Nov 2010 Round 14	Cherno More	3 – 0	Minyor	Varna
14:00 EEST	Tiago 32'; Ratnikov 40'; Nikolov 78'; Tiago (yellow card) 33'; Jardel (yellow card) 74'; Stoyanov (yellow card) 90'	Report	Markov (yellow card) 13'; Todorov (yellow card) 37'; Rangelov (yellow card) 48'; Ivanović (yellow card) 81'	Stadium: Ticha; Attendance: 1,500; Referee: Ivaylo Stoyanov

27 Nov 2010 Round 15	Beroe	0 – 0	Cherno More	Stara Zagora
14:00 EEST	Dimitrov (yellow card) 40'; Ilchev (yellow card) 40'; Kostadinov (yellow card) 56'; Penev (yellow card) 90'		Tiago (yellow card) 18'; Petkov (yellow card) 40'; Dimov (yellow card) 40'; Marques (yellow card) 63'; A. Aleksandrov (yellow card) 71'; Ademar (yellow card) 89'	Stadium: Beroe; Attendance: 1,756; Referee: Georgi Kabakov

26 Feb 2011 Round 16	Pirin	0 – 1	Cherno More	Blagoevgrad
15:00 EEST	Kostadinov (yellow card) 84'; Rizov (yellow card) 90'	Report	Bozhilov 5'; Tiago (yellow card); Iliev (yellow card)	Stadium: Hristo Botev; Attendance: 2,500; Referee: Stanislav Todorov

5 Mar 2011 Round 17	Cherno More	1 – 1	Loko Plovdiv	Varna
15:00 EEST	Bozhilov 16'; Georgiev (yellow card) 23'; Dyakov (red card) 34'; Atanasov (yellow card) 66'; Nikolov (yellow card) 89'	Report	Zlatinski 55' (pen.); S. Bengelloun (yellow card) 6'; Zlatinski (yellow card) 62'	Stadium: Ticha; Attendance: 3,000; Referee: Tasko Taskov

12 Mar 2011 Round 18	Akademik	0 – 0	Cherno More	Sofia
15:00 EEST	Petkov (yellow card) 35'	Report	Tiago (yellow card) 60'	Stadium: Ovcha Kupel; Attendance: 300; Referee: Stefan Spasov

20 Mar 2011 Round 19	Cherno More	1 – 0	CSKA	Varna
15:00 EEST	Atanasov 79'; Bozhilov (yellow card) 11'; S. Aleksandrov (yellow card) 16'; Atanasov (yellow card) 77'; Ademar (yellow card) 85'; Ratnikov (yellow card) 90'	Report	Yanev (yellow card) 21'; Delev (yellow card) 42'; Stoyanov (yellow card) 48'; Bandalovski (yellow card) 62'; Marquinhos (yellow card) 63'; Karadzhov (yellow card) 90'	Stadium: Ticha; Attendance: 7,000; Referee: Ivaylo Stoyanov

1 Apr 2011 Round 20	Chernomorets	1 – 2	Cherno More	Burgas
21:00 EEST	Hajri 90+3'; Starokin (yellow card) 31'	Report	Bozhilov 9'; Iliev 19' (pen.); Camazzola (yellow card) 28'; Georgiev (yellow card) 54'; Dyakov (yellow card) 62'	Stadium: Lazur; Attendance: 400; Referee: Anton Genov

9 Apr 2011 Round 21	Cherno More	5 – 0	Vidima-Rakovski	Varna
15:00 EEST	Iliev 35'; Atanasov 40'; Atanasov 47'; Ratnikov 73'; Lazarov 83'; S. Aleksandrov (yellow card) 19'; Camazzola (yellow card) 37'	Report	Gospodinov (yellow card) 19'; Velev (yellow card) 41'	Stadium: Ticha; Attendance: 1,200; Referee: Ahmed Ahmed

17 Apr 2011 Round 22	Levski	1 – 0	Cherno More	Sofia
21:00 EEST	Ivanov 57'; Iliev (yellow card) 90'	Report	Denchev (yellow card) 36'; Camazzola (yellow card) 81'; Tiago (yellow card) 86'; Nikolov (yellow card) 90'	Stadium: Georgi Asparuhov; Attendance: 2,000; Referee: Nikola Popov

25 Apr 2011 Round 23	Sliven 2000	1 – 3	Cherno More	Sliven
17:00 EEST	Marchev 21'; Ilić (yellow card) 53'; Karamanov (yellow card) 57'	Report	Atanasov 22'; Iliev 66', 89'; Iliev (yellow card) 57'; Bozhilov (yellow card) 58'; Georgiev (yellow card) 61'; Stoyanov (yellow card) 90+2'	Stadium: Hadzhi Dimitar; Attendance: 2,000; Referee: Ahmed Ahmed

30 Apr 2011 Round 24	Cherno More	0 – 1	Litex	Varna
18:00 EEST	Bozhilov (yellow card) 11'; Petkov (yellow card) 44'; Camazzola (yellow card) 79'	Report	G. Milanov 61'; Bodurov (red card) 62'; G. Milanov (yellow card) 37'; Yanev (yellow card) 60'; Vinícius (yellow card) 86'; Barthe (yellow card) 90+2'	Stadium: Ticha; Attendance: 3,500; Referee: Stefan Spasov

4 May 2011 Round 25	Slavia	0 – 1	Cherno More	Sofia
18:00 EEST	Georgiev (yellow card) 70'; Deniran (yellow card) 80'	Report	R. Kolev 45+1'; Petkov (yellow card) 7'; Iliev (yellow card) 60'; S. Aleksandrov (yellow card) 62'	Stadium: Ovcha Kupel; Attendance: 500; Referee: Ivaylo Stoyanov

8 May 2011 Round 26	Cherno More	0 – 0	Montana	Varna
18:00 EEST		Report	Gueye (yellow card) 44'; Ivanov (yellow card) 64'; Domakinov (yellow card) 82'; Anderson (yellow card) 90+4'	Stadium: Ticha; Attendance: 800; Referee: Kalin Lyudmilov

14 May 2011 Round 27	Loko Sofia	1 – 1	Cherno More	Sofia
21:00 EEST	Dafchev 88' (pen.); Sv. Dyakov (yellow card) 13'	Report	Nikolov 56'; Atanasov (yellow card) 4'; Tiago (yellow card) 9'; S. Aleksandrov (yellow card) 49'; A. Aleksandrov (yellow card) 87'; T. Dyakov (yellow card) 87'; Camazzola (yellow card) 90'	Stadium: Lokomotiv; Attendance: 500; Referee: Anton Genov

18 May 2011 Round 28	Cherno More	2 – 0	Kaliakra	Varna
18:00 EEST	Iliev 3' (pen.); Nikolov 15'; Dyakov (yellow card) 18'	Report	Tawiah (yellow card) 81'	Stadium: Ticha; Attendance: 1,700; Referee: Tasko Taskov

21 May 2011 Round 29	Minyor	1 – 1	Cherno More	Pernik
18:00 EEST	Vandev 74'; Stoychev (yellow card) 51'; Brahimi (yellow card) 58'; Markov (yellow card) 68'	Report	Kaptiev 66'; R. Kolev (yellow card) 30'; Kapitanov (yellow card) 64'; Camazzola (yellow card) 79'; Petkov (yellow card) 84'	Stadium: Minyor; Attendance: 2,400; Referee: Georgi Kabakov

28 May 2011 Round 30	Cherno More	1 – 0	Beroe	Varna
18:00 EEST	Iliev 26'; Iliev (yellow card) 26'	Report	Dinkov (yellow card) 9'; Bachev (yellow card) 59'	Stadium: Ticha; Attendance: 1,500; Referee: Vihren Manev

===== League table =====
Pos	Team	Pld	W	D	L	GF	GA	GD	Pts	Qualification or relegation
4	Lokomotiv Sofia	30	16	4	10	47	33	+14	52 (Note: Lokomotiv Sofia ahead of Lokomotiv Plovdiv on head-to-head record; Lokomotiv Sofia–Lokomotiv Plovdiv 3–0, Lokomotiv Plovdiv–Lokomotiv Sofia 0–0.)	Qualification for Europa League second qualifying round
5	Lokomotiv Plovdiv	30	14	10	6	54	28	+26	52	
6	Cherno More	30	15	6	9	36	28	+8	51	
7	Beroe	30	13	7	10	33	34	−1	46	
8	Chernomorets Burgas	30	9	10	11	19	28	−9	37	

Source: A PFG (in Bulgarian)
Rules for classification: 1st points; 2nd head-to-head points; 3rd head-to-head goal difference; 4th head-to-head goals scored; 5th head-to-head away goals scored; 6th goal difference; 7th goals scored

===== Results summary =====
Overall								Home						Away					
Pld	W	D	L	GF	GA	GD	Pts	W	D	L	GF	GA	GD	W	D	L	GF	GA	GD
30	15	6	9	36	28	+8	51	10	2	3	25	9	+16	5	4	6	11	19	−8

Last updated: 28 May 2011.
Source: Soccerway

===== League performance =====
Round	1	2	3	4	5	6	7	8	9	10	11	12	13	14	15	16	17	18	19	20	21	22	23	24	25	26	27	28	29	30
Ground	H	A	H	A	H	A	H	H	A	H	A	H	A	H	A	A	H	A	H	A	H	A	A	H	A	H	A	H	A	H
Result	W	L	W	L	L	W	L	W	L	W	L	W	L	W	D	W	D	D	W	W	W	L	W	L	W	D	D	W	D	W
Position	2	9	6	9	11	8	8	8	9	7	10	9	9	9	9	8	7	8	6	6	5	6	6	6	6	6	5	5	6	6

Source: Cherno More league results
A = Away; H = Home; W = Win; D = Draw; L = Loss

===== Goalscorers in A PFG =====
Rank	Nat	Name	Goals
1	(Bulgaria)	Iliev	9
2	(Bulgaria)	Atanasov	5
3	(Bulgaria)	Bozhilov	4
4	(Bulgaria)	Nikolov	3
5	(Brazil)	Tiago	2
=	(Estonia)	Ratnikov	2
=	(Bulgaria)	Yurukov	2

==== Bulgarian Cup ====
20 Nov 2010 1/16	Montana	0 – 1	Cherno More	Montana
13:30 EEST			Ratnikov 9'	Stadium: Ogosta; Attendance: 2,000; Referee: Vihren Manev

4 Dec 2010 1/8	Kom-Minyor	0 – 1	Cherno More	Berkovitsa
13:30 EEST			Ademar 71'	Stadium: Mramor; Attendance: 3,000; Referee: Aleksandar Kostadinov

5 Apr 2011 1/4	CSKA Sofia	2 – 0	Cherno More	Sofia
18:00 EEST	Delev 34'; Marquinhos 67'; Bandalovski (yellow card) 84'	Report		Stadium: Vasil Levski; Attendance: 4,800; Referee: Georgi Yordanov

== Squad stats ==
Appearances for competitive matches only
As of May 28, 2011

No.	Pos	Nat	Player	Total		A Group		Bulgarian Cup	
No.	Pos	Nat	Player	Apps	Goals	Apps	Goals	Apps	Goals
1	GK	(Bulgaria) BUL	Petar Denchev	6	0	6	0	0	0
2	FW	(Bulgaria) BUL	Vasil Tachev	1	0	1	0	0	0
3	MF	(Brazil) BRA	Ademar Júnior	24	1	21	0	3	1
4	DF	(Bulgaria) BUL	Radoslav Bachev	5	0	5	0	0	0
5	MF	(Brazil) BRA	Samuel Camazzola	15	0	14	0	1	0
6	DF	(Bulgaria) BUL	Tanko Dyakov	30	1	28	1	2	0
7	MF	(Bulgaria) BUL	Stanislav Stoyanov	12	0	10	0	2	0
8	FW	(Bulgaria) BUL	Doncho Atanasov	24	5	21	5	3	0
9	FW	(Bulgaria) BUL	Miroslav Budinov	4	0	3	0	1	0
11	FW	(Bulgaria) BUL	Todor Kolev	8	0	8	0	0	0
12	DF	(Brazil) BRA	Marco Tiago	25	2	22	2	3	0
13	FW	(Bulgaria) BUL	Ilian Kapitanov	2	0	2	0	0	0
14	FW	(Bulgaria) BUL	Georgi Bozhilov	31	4	28	4	3	0
15	DF	(Bulgaria) BUL	Aleksandar Aleksandrov	27	0	24	0	3	0
16	MF	(Bulgaria) BUL	Dimitar Petkov	22	0	20	0	2	0
17	MF	(Bulgaria) BUL	Yancho Andreev	3	0	3	0	0	0
18	MF	(Bulgaria) BUL	Viktor Mitev	1	0	1	0	0	0
20	DF	(Bulgaria) BUL	Mihail Lazarov	3	1	3	1	0	0
21	MF	(Bulgaria) BUL	Georgi Iliev	28	9	26	9	2	0
23	MF	(Bulgaria) BUL	Daniel Georgiev	28	1	25	1	3	0
25	DF	(Bulgaria) BUL	Sasho Aleksandrov	30	1	27	1	3	0
26	GK	(Bulgaria) BUL	Ilko Pirgov	29	0	26	0	3	0
27	MF	(Estonia) EST	Daniil Ratnikov	18	3	16	2	2	1
31	FW	(Bulgaria) BUL	Miroslav Manolov	0	0	0	0	0	0
55	DF	(Bulgaria) BUL	Rosen Kolev	9	1	8	1	1	0
77	FW	(Bulgaria) BUL	Vladimir Kaptiev	8	1	7	1	1	0
90	FW	(Bulgaria) BUL	Rumen Nikolov	18	3	17	3	1	0
Players sold or loaned out after the start of the season:
	GK	(Bulgaria) BUL	Aleksandar Kraev	0	0	0	0	0	0
	DF	(Bulgaria) BUL	Kamen Trifonov	0	0	0	0	0	0
	DF	(Bulgaria) BUL	Nikolay Domakinov	2	0	2	0	0	0
	MF	(Bulgaria) BUL	Vladko Kostadinov	0	0	0	0	0	0
	MF	(Brazil) BRA	Eli Marques	8	0	8	0	0	0
	MF	(Bulgaria) BUL	Daniel Dimov	17	1	15	1	2	0
	MF	(Bulgaria) BUL	Milen Petkov	0	0	0	0	0	0
	MF	(Bulgaria) BUL	Yordan Yurukov	13	2	13	2	0	0
	FW	(Brazil) BRA	Mário Jardel	8	1	8	1	0	0
