= 2013–14 PFC Cherno More Varna season =

Cherno More
2013–14 season
- Chairman: Marin Mitev
- Manager: Georgi Ivanov
- A PFG: 6th
- Bulgarian Cup: 2nd round (knocked out by Botev Plovdiv)
- Top goalscorer: League: Bacari (11); All: Bacari (11)
- Highest home attendance: 7,350 (vs CSKA, 23 March 2014)
- Lowest home attendance: 400 (vs Pirin Gotse Delchev, 29 September 2013)
- Average home league attendance: 2,053

This page covers all relevant details regarding PFC Cherno More Varna for all official competitions inside the 2013–14 season. These are A PFG and Bulgarian Cup.

== Transfers ==
=== In ===
Date	Pos.	Name	From	Fee
5 June 2013	MF	(Bulgaria) Todor Palankov	Chernomorets Burgas	Free
5 June 2013	MF	(Bulgaria) Daniel Mladenov	Montana	Free
5 June 2013	DF	(Bulgaria) Kiril Kotev	Lokomotiv Plovdiv	Free
5 June 2013	DF	(Bulgaria) Stefan Stanchev	Minyor Pernik	Free
14 June 2013	MF	(Bulgaria) Ivan Kokonov	Slavia	Free
8 July 2013	DF	(Bulgaria) Mihail Venkov	CSKA	Free
9 July 2013	FW	(Spain) Bacari	(Spain) L'Hospitalet	Free
13 July 2013	MF	(Bulgaria) Daniel Georgiev	Lokomotiv Plovdiv	Free
12 January 2014	GK	(Bulgaria) Nik Dashev	Chernomorets Burgas	Free
26 February 2014	MF	(Bulgaria) Dimo Atanasov	Slavia	Free
3 March 2014	FW	(Bulgaria) Valeri Domovchiyski	Botev Plovdiv	Free

=== Out ===
Date	Pos.	Name	To	Fee
25 May 2013	FW	(Venezuela) Hermes Palomino	Atlético Venezuela	Free
27 May 2013	MF	(Bulgaria) Todor Kolev	Lyubimets	Free
27 May 2013	MF	(Bulgaria) Simeon Simeonov	Dobrudzha	Free
27 May 2013	MF	(Brazil) Samuel Camazzola	Free agent	Released
27 May 2013	DF	(Slovenia) Sebastjan Komel	Free agent	Released
27 May 2013	DF	(Bulgaria) Detelin Dimitrov	Dobrudzha	Free
5 June 2013	FW	(France) Bruce Inkango	(Turkey) Denizlispor	Free
5 June 2013	MF	(Spain) Cristian Hidalgo	(Israel) Bnei Sakhnin	Free
7 June 2013	FW	(Bulgaria) Miroslav Manolov	Litex	Free
14 June 2013	MF	(Bulgaria) Ilian Kapitanov	Free agent	End of contract
26 June 2013	DF	(Bulgaria) Georgi Radev	Dobrudzha	Free
4 August 2013	GK	(Bulgaria) Georgi Stavrev	Ludogorets Razgrad	Undisclosed
7 December 2013	DF	(Bulgaria) Rosen Kolev	Lyubimets	Free
30 December 2013	GK	(Bulgaria) Emil Mihaylov	Marek	Free
30 December 2013	DF	(Bulgaria) Aleksandar Aleksandrov	Ludogorets Razgrad	Free
3 January 2014	MF	(Bulgaria) Daniel Mladenov	Marek	Free
4 January 2014	MF	(Bulgaria) Simeon Raykov	Chernomorets Burgas	Free
6 January 2014	MF	(Bulgaria) Georgi Iliev	(China) Shijiazhuang Yongchang	€100,000

=== Loans in ===
Date	Pos.	Name	From	End date	Fee
16 July 2013	MF	(Nigeria) Stanley Okoro	(Spain) Almería B	End of season	Free

== Squad information ==
N	Pos.	Nat.	Name	Age	EU	Since	App	Goals	Ends	Transfer fee	Previous Club	Notes
1	GK	(Bulgaria)	Emil Mihaylov	25	EU	2013	3	0	2014	Free	Lokomotiv Sofia	(Note: Player left the club in December 2013.)
1	GK	(Bulgaria)	Nik Dashev	22	EU	2014	1	0	2015	Free	Chernomorets Burgas	
2	RW	(Bulgaria)	Nikolay Minkov	16	EU	2014	0	0		Youth system	Cherno More Academy	
3	CM	(Bulgaria)	Daniel Georgiev	31	EU	2013	137	14	2015	Free	Lokomotiv Plovdiv	(Note: Georgiev made 101 appearances and scored 12 goals during his first spell at the club between 2007 and 2011.)
4	LB	(Bulgaria)	Mihail Venkov	30	EU	2013	35	0	2015	Free	CSKA	
5	RB	(Bulgaria)	Stefan Stanchev	25	EU	2013	25	0	2015	Free	Minyor Pernik	
6	CB	(Bulgaria)	Kiril Kotev (captain)	32	EU	2013	34	2	2015	Free	Lokomotiv Plovdiv	(Note: Georgi Iliev was captain during the first half of the season.)
7	AM	(Bulgaria)	Bekir Rasim	19	EU	2012	22	0	2016	Youth system	Cherno More Academy	
8	DM	(Brazil)	Edenilson Bergonsi	26	EU	2012	59	7	2015	Free	(Belgium) Standard Liège	
9	FW	(Spain)	Bacari	26	EU	2013	35	11	2015	Free	(Spain) L'Hospitalet	
10	DM	(Bulgaria)	Todor Palankov	30	EU	2013	42	1	2015	Free	Chernomorets Burgas	(Note: Palankov made 13 appearances during his first spell at the club in 2007.)
11	LW	(Bulgaria)	Simeon Raykov	24	EU	2013	35	8	2015	Undisclosed	Levski Sofia	(Note: Player left the club in January 2014.)
11	FW	(Bulgaria)	Valeri Domovchiyski	27	EU	2014	11	3	2014	Free	Botev Plovdiv	
12	GK	(Bulgaria)	Hristiyan Hristov	19	EU	2013	1	0		Youth system	Cherno More Academy	
14	FW	(Bulgaria)	Georgi Bozhilov	27	EU	2010	119	18	2014	€100,000	Chernomorets Burgas	
15	CB	(Bulgaria)	Aleksandar Aleksandrov	27	EU	2005	217	5	2014	€30,000	Chernomorets Burgas	
16	DM	(Bulgaria)	Aleksandar Yovchev	17	EU	2014	0	0		Youth system	Cherno More Academy	
17	LW	(Bulgaria)	Ivan Kokonov	22	EU	2013	28	1	2015	Free	Slavia	
19	RB	(Bulgaria)	Martin Kostadinov	18	EU	2014	2	0		Youth system	Cherno More Academy	
20	RW	(Nigeria)	Stanley Okoro	21	Non-EU	2013	19	2	2014	Free	(Spain) Almería B (loan)	
21	CM	(Bulgaria)	Georgi Iliev (captain)	32	EU	2008	207	48	2014	€100,000	CSKA	(Note: G. Iliev made 72 appearances and scored 13 goals during his first spell at the club between 2000 and 2003.)
23	RW	(Bulgaria)	Daniel Mladenov	26	EU	2013	9	1	2015	Free	Montana	
24	CB	(Bulgaria)	Slavi Stalev	20	EU	2012	7	0	2015	Youth system	Cherno More Academy	
25	RB	(Bulgaria)	Sasho Aleksandrov	27	EU	2010	118	2	2014	€30,000	Beroe	
28	CM	(Bulgaria)	Aleksandar Popov	17	EU	2014	2	0		Youth system	Cherno More Academy	
30	LW	(Bulgaria)	Dimo Atanasov	28	EU	2014	14	1	2014	Free	Slavia	
31	AM	(Bulgaria)	Kristian Peshkov	18	EU	2014	1	0		Youth system	Cherno More Academy	
32	RW	(Bulgaria)	Petko Tsankov	18	EU	2013	1	0		Youth system	Cherno More Academy	
33	GK	(Bulgaria)	Georgi Kitanov	19	EU	2012	65	0	2016	Youth system	Cherno More Academy	
37	GK	(Bulgaria)	Georgi Stavrev	17	EU	2013	0	0		Youth system	Cherno More Academy	(Note: Player left the club in August 2013.)
55	CB	(Bulgaria)	Rosen Kolev	23	EU	2011	64	4	2013	Free	Kom-Minyor	
91	CB	(Bulgaria)	Zhivko Atanasov	23	EU	2012	52	2	2014	Free	Levski Sofia	
99	FW	(Bulgaria)	Atanas Iliev	19	EU	2012	15	2	2016	Youth system	Cherno More Academy	

- Last updated: 18 May 2014

== Competitions ==
=== Overall ===
==== Competition Record ====
Competition	Started round	Current position/round	Final position/round	First match	Last match	Record							
Competition	Started round	Current position/round	Final position/round	First match	Last match	P	W	D	L	GF	GA	GD	Win %
A PFG	—	—	6th/40	19 July 2013	18 May 2014	38	14	12	12	40	33	+7	36.84
Bulgarian Cup	First Round	—	Second Round	18 September 2013	17 November 2013	4	1	2	1	2	1	+1	25.00
Total						42	15	14	13	42	34	+8	35.71

Updated to match played 18 May 2014
Source: Competitions

==== Summary ====
Clean sheets	17 (14 A PFG, 3 Bulgarian Cup)
Yellow cards	107 (101 A PFG, 6 Bulgarian Cup)
Red cards	4 (4 A PFG)
Worst discipline	(Spain) Bacari (13 (yellow card) )
Biggest Win	4–0 vs Lyibimets (A)
Biggest Defeat	1–3 vs Ludogorets (A)
Most appearances	(Bulgaria) Daniel Georgiev (39)
Top scorer	(Spain) Bacari (11)

=== Pre-season and Friendlies ===
25 June 2013	Chernomorets Burgas	0 – 1	Cherno More	Rakitovo
18:00 EEST		Report	G. Iliev 7' (pen.)	Referee: Georgi Kabakov

29 June 2013	Lokomotiv Sofia	2 – 0	Cherno More	Bansko
10:30 EEST	Marquinhos 32'; Garov 86'	Report		Stadium: Piri Complex; Referee: Ivaylo Stoyanov

2 July 2013	Pirin Gotse Delchev	1 – 1	Cherno More	Bansko
18:00 EEST	Marchev 84'	Report	Bozhilov 5'	Stadium: Saint Petar; Referee: Angel Bayaltsaliev

5 July 2013	Bansko	1 – 3	Cherno More	Bansko
10:00 EEST	K. Stoyanov 37'	Report	A. Iliev 14'; Okoro 32', 54'	Stadium: Saint Petar

13 July 2013	Cherno More	2 – 0	Kaliakra	Varna
18:00 EEST	Okoro 3'; Kokonov 77'	Report		Stadium: Ticha; Referee: Zhivko Dimitrov

30 July 2013	Cherno More	3 – 3	Dobrudzha	Varna
18:00 EEST	Rasim 35'; Kokonov 52', 55'	Report	Lazarov 62'; Tachev 67', 89' (pen.)	Stadium: Ticha; Referee: Radoslav Stanev

6 September 2013	Cherno More	4 – 1	Kaliakra	Varna
17:00 EEST	Kolev 4'; Kokonov 22'; Mladenov 34'; A. Iliev 49'	Report	Yashar 40' (pen.)	Stadium: Ticha; Referee: Radoslav Stanev

25 January 2014	Cherno More	4 – 0	Kaliakra	Varna
13:30 EET	Venkov 28'; Bacari 52'; Okoro 79'; Yoskov 90'	Report		Stadium: Mladost; Referee: Ivan Kirilov

29 January 2014	Dragovoljac (Croatia)	0 – 1	(Bulgaria) Cherno More	Alanya, Turkey
15:00 EET		Report	Edenilson 1'

31 January 2014	Atyrau (Kazakhstan)	1 – 1	(Bulgaria) Cherno More	Gold City Complex, Turkey
17:00 EET	Rudzik 30'	Report	Kotev 64'

3 February 2014	Terek Grozny (Russia)	1 – 2	(Bulgaria) Cherno More	Side, Turkey
17:00 EET	Kadiyev 30'	Report	A. Iliev 21'; Rasim 32'	Stadium: Star Light Complex

5 February 2014	Saburtalo (Georgia (country))	2 – 3	(Bulgaria) Cherno More	Gold City Complex, Turkey
17:00 EET	86'; 87'	Report	S. Aleksandrov 1'; Kokonov 12'; Rasim 89' (pen.)

8 February 2014	CS Universitatea Craiova (Romania)	1 – 0	(Bulgaria) Cherno More	Gold City Complex, Turkey
15:00 EET	Varga 49'	Report

14 February 2014	Cherno More	1 – 3	Dobrudzha	Varna
14:00 EET	Bacari 6'	Report	Andonov 42'; Vasilev 76'; S. Georgiev 82'	Stadium: Ticha

=== A PFG ===
19 July 2013 1	Chernomorets Burgas	1 – 0	Cherno More	Burgas
21:00 EEST	Atanasov 17'; N’Lundulu (yellow card) 5'; Filipov (yellow card) 56'	Report	Edenilson (yellow card) 41'; Palankov (yellow card) 77'; Venkov (yellow card) 90'	Stadium: Lazur; Attendance: 980; Referee: Stanislav Todorov

27 July 2013 2	Cherno More	0 – 0	Slavia	Varna
18:00 EEST	Raykov (yellow card) 68'; G. Iliev (yellow card) 80'; Kolev (yellow card) 83'	Report	Atanasov (yellow card) 49' (yellow-red card) 81'	Stadium: Ticha; Attendance: 1,170; Referee: Tasko Taskov

3 August 2013 3	CSKA	0 – 0	Cherno More	Sofia
20:00 EEST	Iliev (yellow card) 35'	Report	Okoro (yellow card) 26'; Georgiev (yellow card) 52'; Raykov (yellow card) 74'; Kitanov (yellow card) 82'; Stanchev (yellow card) 90+1'	Stadium: Balgarska Armiya; Attendance: 5,700; Referee: Georgi Yordanov

10 August 2013 4	Cherno More	1 – 0	Lokomotiv Plovdiv	Varna
18:00 EEST	Raykov 68'; Raykov (yellow card) 73'; Stanchev (yellow card) 86'	Report	Gospodinov (yellow card) 49'; N'Diaye (yellow card) 73'; Timonov (yellow card) 90'	Stadium: Ticha; Attendance: 1,450; Referee: Hristo Ristoskov

19 August 2013 5	Beroe	0 – 0	Cherno More	Stara Zagora
21:00 EEST	Martins (yellow card) 12'; Elias (yellow card) 42'; Caiado (yellow card) 75'	Report	Georgiev (yellow card) 60'; Bozhilov (yellow card) 79'; Bacari (yellow card) 90+2'; Mihaylov (yellow card) 90+4'	Stadium: Beroe; Attendance: 3,180; Referee: Georgi Dimitrov

25 August 2013 6	Levski	1 – 1	Cherno More	Sofia
20:00 EEST	Rodrigues 50' (pen.); Vutov (yellow card) 13'; Starokin (yellow card) 59'; Angelov (yellow card) 65'	Report	Raykov 53'; Bacari (yellow card) 27'; A. Aleksandrov (yellow card) 42'; Stanchev (red card) 49'; Edenilson (yellow card) 75'; Kotev (yellow card) 90+1'	Stadium: Georgi Asparuhov; Attendance: 2,490; Referee: Nikolay Yordanov

31 August 2013 7	Cherno More	3 – 1	Ludogorets	Varna
18:00 EEST	Bozhilov 21', 54'; Georgiev 71'; Georgiev (yellow card) 20'; Raykov (yellow card) 48'; Kitanov (yellow card) 89'; Kolev (yellow card) 90'	Report	Espinho 80'; Moți (yellow card) 8'	Stadium: Ticha; Attendance: 2,810; Referee: Vihren Manev

14 September 2013 8	Neftochimic	0 – 1	Cherno More	Targovishte
17:00 EEST	Yoshev (yellow card) 45' (yellow-red card) 87'; K. Yanev (yellow card) 84'	Report	Mladenov 79'; Stanchev (yellow card) 21'; Raykov (yellow card) 81'	Stadium: Dimitar Burkov; Attendance: 330; Referee: Nikola Popov

21 September 2013 9	Cherno More	2 – 2	Lokomotiv Sofia	Varna
17:00 EEST	Bacari 5'; Raykov 14'; Venkov (yellow card) 30'; Kitanov (yellow card) 90+3'	Report	Helton 80'; Marquinhos 90+4'; Jovanović (yellow card) 44'; Branekov (yellow card) 90+3'	Stadium: Ticha; Attendance: 2,430; Referee: Georgi Yordanov

25 September 2013 10	Botev Plovdiv	2 – 0	Cherno More	Plovdiv
16:00 EEST	Romario 25'; Anicet 87'; Minev (yellow card) 17'	Report	Kotev (yellow card) 20'; Edenilson (yellow card) 26'; Kokonov (yellow card) 85'	Stadium: Hristo Botev; Attendance: 1,840; Referee: Hristo Ristoskov

29 September 2013 11	Cherno More	2 – 1	Pirin Gotse Delchev	Varna
17:00 EEST	Bacari 13' (pen.); Kotev 56'; Kokonov (yellow card) 25'; S. Aleksandrov (yellow card) 77'	Report	V. Marchev 34'; Ibrahim (yellow card) 12' (yellow-red card) 15'	Stadium: Ticha; Attendance: 400; Referee: Martin Bogdev

5 October 2013 12	Litex	2 – 1	Cherno More	Lovech
18:00 EEST	Jordán 53'; Manolov 84'; Tsvetanov (yellow card) 35'; Bodurov (yellow card) 51'	Report	Kotev 22'; Palankov (yellow card) 36'; Venkov (yellow card) 36'; Bacari (yellow card) 53'; A. Aleksandrov (yellow card) 61'	Stadium: Lovech; Attendance: 360; Referee: Nikola Popov

20 October 2013 13	Cherno More	2 – 0	Lyubimets	Varna
16:00 EEST	Bacari 5', 57'; Kokonov (yellow card) 55'	Report		Stadium: Ticha; Attendance: 1,240; Referee: Tasko Taskov

27 October 2013 14	Cherno More	2 – 0	Chernomorets Burgas	Varna
14:00 EET	Raykov 11'; Bacari 90+2'; Palankov (yellow card) 33'; Bacari (yellow card) 58'; Georgiev (yellow card) 81'	Report	Trayanov (yellow card) 22'; Gamakov (yellow card) 34'; Fonseca (yellow card) 34'	Stadium: Ticha; Attendance: 1,660; Referee: Nikolay Yordanov

30 October 2013 15	Slavia	2 – 0	Cherno More	Sofia
15:00 EET	Popara 34'; Kurdov 82'; Kurdov (yellow card) 53'; Atanasov (yellow card) 68'; Sandanski (yellow card) 77'; Petkov (yellow card) 78'	Report	Kolev (yellow card) 26' (yellow-red card) 62'; Kitanov (yellow card) 32'; S. Aleksandrov (yellow card) 57'; Rasim (yellow card) 78'	Stadium: Ovcha Kupel; Attendance: 90; Referee: Dimitar Andreev

3 November 2013 16	Cherno More	2 – 1	CSKA	Varna
14:30 EET	Raykov 33'; Bacari 36' (pen.); Mihaylov (yellow card) 90+4'	Report	Gargorov 22'; Iliev (yellow card) 35'; Sidibé (yellow card) 52'; Mendy (yellow card) 62'; A. Popov (yellow card) 84'	Stadium: Ticha; Attendance: 6,830; Referee: Stanislav Todorov

11 November 2013 17	Lokomotiv Plovdiv	1 – 0	Cherno More	Plovdiv
18:00 EET	A. Belaïd 15'	Report	Okoro (yellow card) 7'; Georgiev (yellow card) 83'; Bacari (yellow card) 84'	Stadium: Lokomotiv; Attendance: 1,710; Referee: Tasko Taskov

23 November 2013 18	Cherno More	1 – 1	Beroe	Varna
13:00 EET	Kokonov 82'; Georgiev (yellow card) 45'; Bacari (yellow card) 66'; Okoro (red card) 69'; Edenilson (yellow card) 76'	Report	Martins 72'; Krumov (yellow card) 23'; Dinkov (yellow card) 30'; Zehirov (yellow card) 85'	Stadium: Ticha; Attendance: 2,510; Referee: Ivaylo Stoyanov

30 November 2013 19	Cherno More	2 – 1	Levski	Varna
13:00 EET	G. Iliev 41'; Bacari 61'; Bacari (yellow card) 42'; S. Aleksandrov (yellow card) 45' (yellow-red card) 83'; Raykov (yellow card) 86'; Kitanov (yellow card) 90+4'	Report	Touré 77'; Touré (yellow card) 37'; Pinto (yellow card) 61'; D. Dimov (yellow card) 83'	Stadium: Ticha; Attendance: 4,300; Referee: Hristo Ristoskov

4 December 2013 20	Ludogorets	1 – 1	Cherno More	Razgrad
14:00 EET	Moți 73'; Moți (yellow card) 44'; Caiçara (yellow card) 86'; Marcelinho (yellow card) 90+5'	Report	Bacari 35'; Stanchev (yellow card) 38'; Bacari (yellow card) 40'; Venkov (yellow card) 59'; Kitanov (yellow card) 62'; Palankov (yellow card) 70'; Georgiev (yellow card) 77'; Edenilson (yellow card) 86'	Stadium: Ludogorets Arena; Attendance: 750; Referee: Kalin Lyudmilov

7 December 2013 21	Cherno More	2 – 1	Neftochimic	Varna
14:00 EET	Raykov 48'; Palankov 90'; Okoro (yellow card) 26'	Report	Hristov 84'; Patev (yellow card) 36'; K. Yanev (yellow card) 44'	Stadium: Ticha; Attendance: 690; Referee: Stanislav Stavrov

11 December 2013 22	Lokomotiv Sofia	0 – 2	Cherno More	Sofia
14:00 EET	Garov (yellow card) 44'	Report	Okoro 9'; G. Iliev 21'; Palankov (yellow card) 42'; Georgiev (yellow card) 64'	Stadium: Lokomotiv; Attendance: 90; Referee: Georgi Dimitrov

16 December 2013 23	Cherno More	1 – 0	Botev Plovdiv	Varna
14:00 EET	Z. Atanasov 90+1'	Report		Stadium: Ticha; Attendance: 620; Referee: Georgi Yordanov

21 February 2014 24	Pirin Gotse Delchev	1 – 0	Cherno More	Gotse Delchev
13:30 EET	S. Aleksandrov 69' (o.g.); Vitanov (yellow card) 43'; Gutsev (yellow card) 45+2'; Gaziev (yellow card) 71'; Bashov (yellow card) 76'	Report	Palankov (yellow card) 13'; Venkov (yellow card) 90+3'	Stadium: Gradski; Attendance: 440; Referee: Stanislav Todorov

1 March 2014 25	Cherno More	1 – 2	Litex	Varna
14:00 EET	Edenilson 63'; Edenilson (yellow card) 8'; Stanchev (yellow card) 50'; Bacari (yellow card) 54'; Kotev (yellow card) 64'	Report	Jordán 28'; Gjasula 80' (pen.); Bozhikov (yellow card) 25'; Asprilla (yellow card) 43'; Bodurov (yellow card) 49'; Tsvetanov (yellow card) 53'	Stadium: Ticha; Attendance: 900; Referee: Dimitar Andreev

9 March 2014 26	Lyubimets	0 – 4	Cherno More	Lyubimets
15:30 EET	Grozev (yellow card) 13'; Valchev (yellow card) 22'	Report	Domovchiyski 63', 66'; A. Iliev 80'; Georgiev 89'; D. Atanasov (yellow card) 75'	Stadium: Gradski; Attendance: 190; Referee: Tasko Taskov

13 March 2014 27	Litex	0 – 0	Cherno More	Lovech
17:30 EET	Tsvetanov (yellow card) 60'; Tsvetkov (yellow card) 85'	Report	Edenilson (yellow card) 42'; Okoro (yellow card) 45'; Georgiev (yellow card) 73'; Bozhilov (yellow card) 86'; S. Aleksandrov (yellow card) 90+3'	Stadium: Lovech; Attendance: 590; Referee: Georgi Dimitrov

23 March 2014 28	Cherno More	0 – 0	CSKA	Varna
15:45 EET	Bacari (yellow card) 15'; Bozhilov (yellow card) 22'; Kokonov (yellow card) 77'; Edenilson (yellow card) 87'	Report	Krachunov (yellow card) 63'; Mendy (yellow card) 78'	Stadium: Ticha; Attendance: 7,350; Referee: Aleksandar Kostadinov

26 March 2014 29	Botev Plovdiv	1 – 1	Cherno More	Plovdiv
15:00 EET	Doré 17'; Filipov (yellow card) 70'	Report	Bozhilov 23'; Stanchev (yellow card) 5'; Bacari (yellow card) 78'; S. Aleksandrov (yellow card) 89'	Stadium: Sport Complex Botev 1912; Attendance: 1,640; Referee: Kalin Lyudmilov

30 March 2014 30	Cherno More	2 – 0	Lokomotiv Plovdiv	Varna
15:45 EEST	Edenilson 17'; Bacari 81'; Georgiev (yellow card) 61'	Report	Kamburov (yellow card) 41'; Georgiev (yellow card) 59'	Stadium: Ticha; Attendance: 700; Referee: Stanislav Stavrov

6 April 2014 31	Levski	1 – 0	Cherno More	Sofia
19:30 EEST	D. Dimov 17'; Starokin (yellow card) 39'; Belaïd (yellow card) 59'; Bastos (yellow card) 74'; D. Dimov (yellow card) 81'	Report	Bacari (yellow card) 40'	Stadium: Georgi Asparuhov; Attendance: 1,910; Referee: Hristo Ristoskov

32	Cherno More rests for round 32

13 April 2014 33	Cherno More	1 – 1	Ludogorets	Varna
15:45 EEST	Bacari 90+2'; S. Aleksandrov (yellow card) 58'; Palankov (yellow card) 73'	Report	Zlatinski 78' (pen.); Zlatinski (yellow card) 41'; Moți (yellow card) 67'	Stadium: Ticha; Attendance: 1,340; Referee: Georgi Yordanov

18 April 2014 34	Cherno More	1 – 1	Litex	Varna
15:00 EEST	Bacari 48'; Venkov (yellow card) 65'; D. Atanasov (yellow card) 72'; Kitanov (yellow card) 90+1'	Report	Jordán 55'	Stadium: Ticha; Attendance: 690; Referee: Vihren Manev

27 April 2014 35	CSKA	2 – 0	Cherno More	Sofia
17:00 EEST	Stoyanov 36'; Chochev 38'; Faug-Porret (yellow card) 32' (yellow-red card) 85'	Report		Stadium: Balgarska Armiya; Attendance: 1,040; Referee: Georgi Dimitrov

30 April 2014 36	Cherno More	0 – 1	Botev Plovdiv	Varna
17:15 EEST	Stalev (yellow card) 72'	Report	Curtean 20'; Anicet (yellow card) 83'	Stadium: Ticha; Attendance: 420; Referee: Nikola Popov

4 May 2014 37	Lokomotiv Plovdiv	0 – 2	Cherno More	Plovdiv
18:00 EEST	Diego (yellow card) 20'; A. Georgiev (yellow card) 46'; Iliadis (yellow card) 64'	Report	D. Atanasov 11'; Akalski 90+2' (o.g.)	Stadium: Lokomotiv; Attendance: 0 (closed doors); Referee: Tasko Taskov

7 May 2014 38	Cherno More	1 – 2	Levski	Varna
18:00 EEST	Domovchiyski 12'; Kitanov (yellow card) 5'; Venkov (yellow card) 7'; Edenilson (yellow card) 18'; Bacari (yellow card) 37'; Kokonov (yellow card) 72'; Kotev (yellow card) 87'	Report	Gadzhev 8' (pen.); Bojinov 53'; Krumov (yellow card) 10'; Orachev (yellow card) 36'; Bojinov (yellow card) 72'; Petkov (yellow card) 85'; Angelov (yellow card) 87'; Gadzhev (yellow card) 88'	Stadium: Ticha; Attendance: 1,490; Referee: Ivaylo Stoyanov

39	Cherno More rests for round 39

18 May 2014 40	Ludogorets	3 – 1	Cherno More	Razgrad
19:30 EEST	Choco 20'; Quixadá 19'; Kitov 88'; Zlatinski (yellow card) 64'	Report	Okoro 12'; D. Atanasov (yellow card) 28'; Palankov (yellow card) 81'	Stadium: Ludogorets Arena; Attendance: 6,000; Referee: Kalin Lyudmilov

==== League table ====
===== First phase =====
Pos	Team	Pld	W	D	L	GF	GA	GD	Pts	Qualification
5	Lokomotiv Plovdiv	26	14	3	9	43	31	+12	45	Qualification for championship group
6	Levski Sofia	26	13	5	8	45	24	+21	44	Qualification for championship group
7	Cherno More	26	12	7	7	31	21	+10	43	Qualification for championship group
8	Beroe	26	11	6	9	32	25	+7	39	Qualification for relegation group
9	Slavia Sofia	26	8	7	11	35	38	−3	31 (Note: Slavia Sofia ahead of Lokomotiv Sofia on head-to-head record; Slavia Sofia–Lokomotiv Sofia 3–1, Lokomotiv Sofia–Slavia Sofia 0–1.)	Qualification for relegation group

Source: A PFG (in Bulgarian)
Rules for classification: 1st points; 2nd head-to-head points; 3rd head-to-head goal difference; 4th head-to-head goals scored; 5th head-to-head away goals scored; 6th season goal difference; 7th season goals scored; 8th "sportsmanship" (R & Y cards); 9th draw

===== Championship group =====
Pos	Team	Pld	W	D	L	GF	GA	GD	Pts	Qualification
3	Litex Lovech	38	21	9	8	74	37	+37	72 (Note: CSKA Sofia ahead of Litex Lovech on head-to-head points; CSKA Sofia: 10 pts, Litex Lovech: 1 pts.)	Qualification for Europa League first qualifying round
4	Botev Plovdiv	38	18	11	9	57	32	+25	65	Qualification for Europa League first qualifying round
5	Levski Sofia	38	19	5	14	59	39	+20	62	
6	Cherno More	38	14	12	12	40	33	+7	54	
7	Lokomotiv Plovdiv	38	15	5	18	49	55	−6	50	

Source: A PFG (in Bulgarian)
Rules for classification: 1st points; 2nd head-to-head points; 3rd head-to-head goal difference; 4th head-to-head goals scored; 5th head-to-head away goals scored; 6th season goal difference; 7th season goals scored; 8th "sportsmanship" (R & Y cards); 9th draw

==== Results summary ====
Overall								Home						Away					
Pld	W	D	L	GF	GA	GD	Pts	W	D	L	GF	GA	GD	W	D	L	GF	GA	GD
38	14	12	12	40	33	+7	54	10	6	3	26	15	+11	4	6	9	14	18	−4

Last updated: 18 May 2014.
Source: bulgarian-football.com

==== League performance ====
Round	1	2	3	4	5	6	7	8	9	10	11	12	13	14	15	16	17	18	19	20	21	22	23	24	25	26	27	28	29	30	31	32	33	34	35	36	37	38	39	40
Ground	A	H	A	H	A	A	H	A	H	A	H	A	H	H	A	H	A	H	H	A	H	A	H	A	H	A	A	H	A	H	A		H	H	A	H	A	H		A
Result	L	D	D	W	D	D	W	W	D	L	W	L	W	W	L	W	L	D	W	D	W	W	W	L	L	W	D	D	D	W	L	B	D	D	L	L	W	L	B	L
Position	12	12	11	8	9	7	6	4	5	7	7	7	6	6	7	7	7	7	7	7	7	7	6	7	7	7	6	7	6	6	6	6	6	6	6	6	6	6	6	6

Source: bulgarian-football.com
A = Away; H = Home; B = Bye; W = Win; D = Draw; L = Loss

=== Bulgarian Cup ===
18 September 2013 1st Round/1st Leg	Marek	0 – 0	Cherno More	Dupnitsa
17:00 EEST	Lahchev (yellow card) 90+2'	Report	Kolev (yellow card) 73'	Stadium: Bonchuk; Referee: Martin Bogdev

12 October 2013 1st Round/2nd Leg	Cherno More	2 – 0 (2 – 0 agg.)	Marek	Varna
15:00 EEST	Kokonov 16'; Georgiev 70'; Raykov (yellow card) 78'; A. Iliev (yellow card) 90'	Report	Dikov (yellow card) 31'; G. Nikolov (yellow card) 71'; Tonchev (yellow card) 72'	Stadium: Ticha; Referee: Stoyan Denev

7 November 2013 2nd Round/1st Leg	Cherno More	0 – 0	Botev Plovdiv	Varna
14:45 EET	Raykov (yellow card) 19'; A. Aleksandrov (yellow card) 31'	Report	Vander (yellow card) 54'	Stadium: Ticha; Attendance: 1,230; Referee: Nikola Popov

17 November 2013 2nd Round/2nd Leg	Botev Plovdiv	1 – 0 (1 – 0 agg.)	Cherno More	Plovdiv
13:30 EET	Pedro 90+1'	Report	Venkov (yellow card) 56'	Stadium: Hristo Botev; Attendance: 3,260; Referee: Vihren Manev

== Squad statistics ==
Key:
‡ On loan from another club * First appearance(s) for the club

- # = Squad number
- Pos = Playing position
- P = Number of games played
- G = Number of goals scored
- GK = Goalkeeper
- DF = Defender
- MF = Midfielder
- FW = Forward
- = Yellow cards
- = Red cards
- † Permanent player left club during the season
- ¤ Loaned to another club for part or all of season

Correct as of 18 May 2014. Starting appearances are listed first, followed by substitute appearances in parentheses where applicable.

No.	Pos	Name	P	G	P	G	P	G	A yellow card	A red card	Notes
No.	Pos	Name	League		Bulgarian Cup		Total		Discipline		Notes
1	GK	(Bulgaria) Emil Mihaylov †	2	0	2	0	4	0	2	0	
1	GK	(Bulgaria) Nik Dashev	1	0	0	0	1	0	0	0	
2	MF	(Bulgaria) Nikolay Minkov	0	0	0	0	0	0	0	0	
3	MF	(Bulgaria) Daniel Georgiev	33(3)	2	1(2)	1	34(5)	3	10	0	
4	DF	(Bulgaria) Mihail Venkov	35	0	3	0	38	0	8	0	
5	DF	(Bulgaria) Stefan Stanchev	22(3)	0	1	0	23(3)	0	6	1	
6	DF	(Bulgaria) Kiril Kotev (c)	34	2	2	0	36	2	4	0	
7	MF	(Bulgaria) Bekir Rasim	6(15)	0	1	0	7(15)	0	1	0	
8	MF	(Brazil) Edenilson Bergonsi	33(2)	2	3	0	36(2)	2	9	0	
9	FW	(Spain) Bacari	35	11	2(1)	0	37(1)	11	13	0	
10	MF	(Bulgaria) Todor Palankov	19(10)	1	4	0	23(10)	1	8	0	
11	MF	(Bulgaria) Simeon Raykov †	15(6)	6	1(2)	0	16(8)	6	8	0	
11	FW	(Bulgaria) Valeri Domovchiyski	9(2)	3	0	0	9(2)	3	0	0	
12	GK	(Bulgaria) Hristiyan Hristov	0(1)	0	0(1)	0	0(2)	0	0	0	
14	FW	(Bulgaria) Georgi Bozhilov	24(3)	3	0	0	24(3)	3	3	0	
15	DF	(Bulgaria) Aleksandar Aleksandrov †	18	0	2	0	20	0	3	0	
16	MF	(Bulgaria) Aleksandar Yovchev	0	0	0	0	0	0	0	0	
17	MF	(Bulgaria) Ivan Kokonov	17(11)	1	3(1)	1	20(12)	2	5	0	
19	DF	(Bulgaria) Martin Kostadinov	1(1)	0	0	0	1(1)	0	0	0	
20	MF	(Nigeria) Stanley Okoro ‡	15(4)	2	2(1)	0	17(5)	2	4	1	
21	MF	(Bulgaria) Georgi Iliev (c) †	14(2)	2	2	0	16(2)	2	1	0	
23	MF	(Bulgaria) Daniel Mladenov †	3(6)	1	3	0	6(6)	1	0	0	
24	DF	(Bulgaria) Slavi Stalev	1(2)	0	1	0	2(2)	0	1	0	
25	DF	(Bulgaria) Sasho Aleksandrov	27(3)	0	4	0	31(3)	0	5	1	
28	MF	(Bulgaria) Aleksandar Popov	0(2)	0	0	0	0(2)	0	0	0	
30	MF	(Bulgaria) Dimo Atanasov	4(10)	1	0	0	4(10)	1	3	0	
31	MF	(Bulgaria) Kristian Peshkov	0(1)	0	0	0	0(1)	0	0	0	
32	MF	(Bulgaria) Petko Tsankov	0(1)	0	0(1)	0	0(2)	0	0	0	
33	GK	(Bulgaria) Georgi Kitanov	35	0	2	0	37	0	9	0	
37	GK	(Bulgaria) Georgi Stavrev †	0	0	0	0	0	0	0	0	
55	DF	(Bulgaria) Rosen Kolev †	4(6)	0	2	0	6(6)	0	3	1	
91	DF	(Bulgaria) Zhivko Atanasov	11(8)	1	2(1)	0	13(9)	1	0	0	
99	FW	(Bulgaria) Atanas Iliev	0(9)	1	1(2)	0	1(11)	1	1	0	

=== Goalscorers ===
Rank	Pos.	Player	L	C	Total
1	FW	(Spain) Bacari	11	0	11
2	MF	(Bulgaria) Simeon Raykov	6	0	6
3	FW	(Bulgaria) Georgi Bozhilov	3	0	3
3	FW	(Bulgaria) Valeri Domovchiyski	3	0	3
3	MF	(Bulgaria) Daniel Georgiev	2	1	3
4	DF	(Bulgaria) Kiril Kotev	2	0	2
4	MF	(Bulgaria) Georgi Iliev	2	0	2
4	MF	(Brazil) Edenilson Bergonsi	2	0	2
4	MF	(Nigeria) Stanley Okoro	2	0	2
4	MF	(Bulgaria) Ivan Kokonov	1	1	2
5	MF	(Bulgaria) Daniel Mladenov	1	0	1
5	MF	(Bulgaria) Todor Palankov	1	0	1
5	DF	(Bulgaria) Zhivko Atanasov	1	0	1
5	FW	(Bulgaria) Atanas Iliev	1	0	1
5	MF	(Bulgaria) Dimo Atanasov	1	0	1
Own goals			1	0	1
Totals			40	2	42

=== Captains ===
Player	L	C	Total
(Bulgaria) Georgi Iliev	14	2	16
(Bulgaria) Kiril Kotev	15	0	15
(Bulgaria) Aleksandar Aleksandrov	7	0	7
(Bulgaria) Georgi Bozhilov	2	0	2
(Bulgaria) Rosen Kolev	0	2	2

=== Suspensions served ===
Date	Matches Missed	Player	Reason	Opponents Missed
25 August 2013	1	(Bulgaria) Stefan Stanchev	(red card) vs Levski	Ludogorets (H)
14 September 2013	1	(Bulgaria) Simeon Raykov	5th (yellow card) vs Neftochimic	Marek (A) (C)
30 October 2013	1	(Bulgaria) Georgi Kitanov	5th (yellow card) vs Slavia	CSKA (H)
30 October 2013	1	(Bulgaria) Rosen Kolev	(red card) vs Slavia	CSKA (H)
11 November 2013	1	(Bulgaria) Daniel Georgiev	5th (yellow card) vs Lokomotiv Plovdiv	Botev Plovdiv (A) (C)
11 November 2013	1	(Spain) Bacari	5th (yellow card) vs Lokomotiv Plovdiv	Botev Plovdiv (A) (C)
23 November 2013	2	(Nigeria) Stanley Okoro	(red card) vs Beroe	Levski (H), Ludogorets (A)
30 November 2013	1	(Bulgaria) Sasho Aleksandrov	(red card) vs Levski	Ludogorets (A)
4 December 2013	1	(Bulgaria) Mihail Venkov	5th (yellow card) vs Ludogorets	Neftochimic (H)
4 December 2013	1	(Brazil) Edenilson Bergonsi	5th (yellow card) vs Ludogorets	Neftochimic (H)
11 December 2013	1	(Bulgaria) Todor Palankov	5th (yellow card) vs Lokomotiv Sofia	Botev Plovdiv (H)
1 March 2014	1	(Bulgaria) Stefan Stanchev	5th (yellow card) vs Litex	Lyubimets (A)
1 March 2014	2	(Spain) Bacari	9th (yellow card) vs Litex	Lyubimets (A), Litex (A)
13 March 2014	2	(Bulgaria) Daniel Georgiev	9th (yellow card) vs Litex	CSKA (H), Botev Plovdiv (A)
13 April 2014	1	(Bulgaria) Sasho Aleksandrov	5th (yellow card) vs Ludogorets	Litex (H)
7 May 2014	2	(Bulgaria) Georgi Kitanov	9th (yellow card) vs Levski	Ludogorets (A), first game of next season
7 May 2014	2	(Brazil) Edenilson Bergonsi	9th (yellow card) vs Levski	Ludogorets (A), first game of next season
7 May 2014	3	(Spain) Bacari	13th (yellow card) vs Levski	Ludogorets (A), first two games of next season
7 May 2014	1	(Bulgaria) Ivan Kokonov	5th (yellow card) vs Levski	Ludogorets (A)
18 May 2014	2	(Bulgaria) Dimo Atanasov	9th (yellow card) vs Ludogorets	first two games of next season

== Club ==
=== Coaching staff ===
Position	Staff
Manager	(Bulgaria) Georgi Ivanov
Assistant First Team Coach	(Bulgaria) Ivaylo Petrov
Assistant First Team Coach	(Bulgaria) Emanuil Lukanov
Goalkeeper Coach	(Bulgaria) Stoyan Stavrev
First Team Fitness Coach	(Bulgaria) Veselin Markov
Individual Team Fitness Coach	(Bulgaria) Viktor Bumbalov
Medical Director	(Bulgaria) Dr. Petko Atev
Academy Manager	(Bulgaria) Hristina Dimitrova

Last updated: 17 December 2012
Source: Cherno More

=== Other information ===
Owner/Chairman	(Bulgaria) Marin Mitev
Chief Executive	(Bulgaria) Marin Marinov
Sporting Director	(Bulgaria) Todor Velikov
Ground (capacity and dimensions)	Ticha Stadium (12,500 / 103x67 metres)

Updated to match played 1 August 2012
Source: Cherno More
