= Petar Denchev =

Bulgarian footballer

Personal information
- Full name: Petar Yuriy Denchev
- Date of birth: 16 March 1989 (age 37)
- Place of birth: Plovdiv, Bulgaria
- Height: 1.90 m (6 ft 3 in)
- Position: Goalkeeper

Youth career
- Lokomotiv Plovdiv

Senior career*
Years	Team	Apps	(Gls)
2007–2008	Spartak Plovdiv	7	(0)
2008–2010	Sliven 2000	9	(0)
2010–2012	Cherno More	18	(0)
2013	Lokomotiv Plovdiv	2	(0)
2013	Neftochimic 1986	11	(0)
2014	Spartak Varna	13	(0)
2014–2015	Navbahor Namangan	11	(0)
2015–2016	Neftochimic Burgas	16	(0)
2016	Levski Karlovo	17	(0)
2017	Lokomotiv GO	2	(0)
2017–2018	Amvrysseas		

International career
2006–2008	Bulgaria U-19		
- * Club domestic league appearances and goals as of 17:06, 12 May 2017 (UTC)

Petar Yuriy Denchev (Bulgarian: Петър Юрий Денчев; born 16 March 1989) is a former Bulgarian professional footballer who played as a goalkeeper.

At international level, Denchev was Bulgaria's second-choice goalkeeper, behind Ivan Karadzhov at the 2008 UEFA European Under-19 Football Championship.

== Career ==
Born in Plovdiv, Denchev started his playing career at Lokomotiv Plovdiv's youth system, before moving to Spartak Plovdiv, where he made his first-team debut in the Bulgarian second division. Petar made his debut during the 2007–08 season on 3 November 2007 in a 1–0 away loss against Volov Shumen.

In June 2008, Denchev signed a three-year contract with newly promoted A PFG side Sliven 2000.

On 23 June 2010, Denchev joined Cherno More Varna as cover for Ilko Pirgov. He made his debut, coming on as a substitute for Marco Tiago after Pirgov's sending-off against Montana on 23 October, but was powerless to stop the rivals from scoring two times in a 4–0 loss at the Ogosta Stadium. Denchev took over as Cherno More's first-choice goalkeeper, when Pirgov was transferred to Litex Lovech in December 2011. He made 12 league appearances for the team during the second half of the A PFG season. In May 2012, Denchev sustained a serious injury, which kept him out of action for a number of months. He recovered in mid-September 2012 and in January 2013 signed a contract with Lokomotiv Plovdiv.

In the summer of 2014 he signed a contract with Navbahor Namangan and moved as a free agent to Uzbek League club to play the second half of the season.

On 28 December 2016, Denchev joined Lokomotiv Gorna Oryahovitsa but left the club at the end of the season following their relegation to the Second League.

== Career statistics ==
As of 13 May 2012

Club	Season	B PFG		Bulgarian Cup		Europe		Total	
Club	Season	Apps	Goals	Apps	Goals	Apps	Goals	Apps	Goals
Spartak Plovdiv	2007–08	7	0	0	0	—		7	0
Spartak Plovdiv	Total	7	0	0	0	—		7	0
Club	Season	A PFG		Bulgarian Cup		Europe		Total	
Club	Season	Apps	Goals	Apps	Goals	Apps	Goals	Apps	Goals
Sliven 2000	2008–09	4	0	0	0	—		4	0
Sliven 2000	2009–10	5	0	0	0	—		5	0
Sliven 2000	Total	9	0	0	0	—		9	0
Cherno More	2010–11	6	0	0	0	—		6	0
Cherno More	2011–12	12	0	0	0	—		12	0
Cherno More	Total	18	0	0	0	—		18	0
Total		34	0	0	0	0	0	34	0
