= Hristiyan Hristov =

Bulgarian footballer

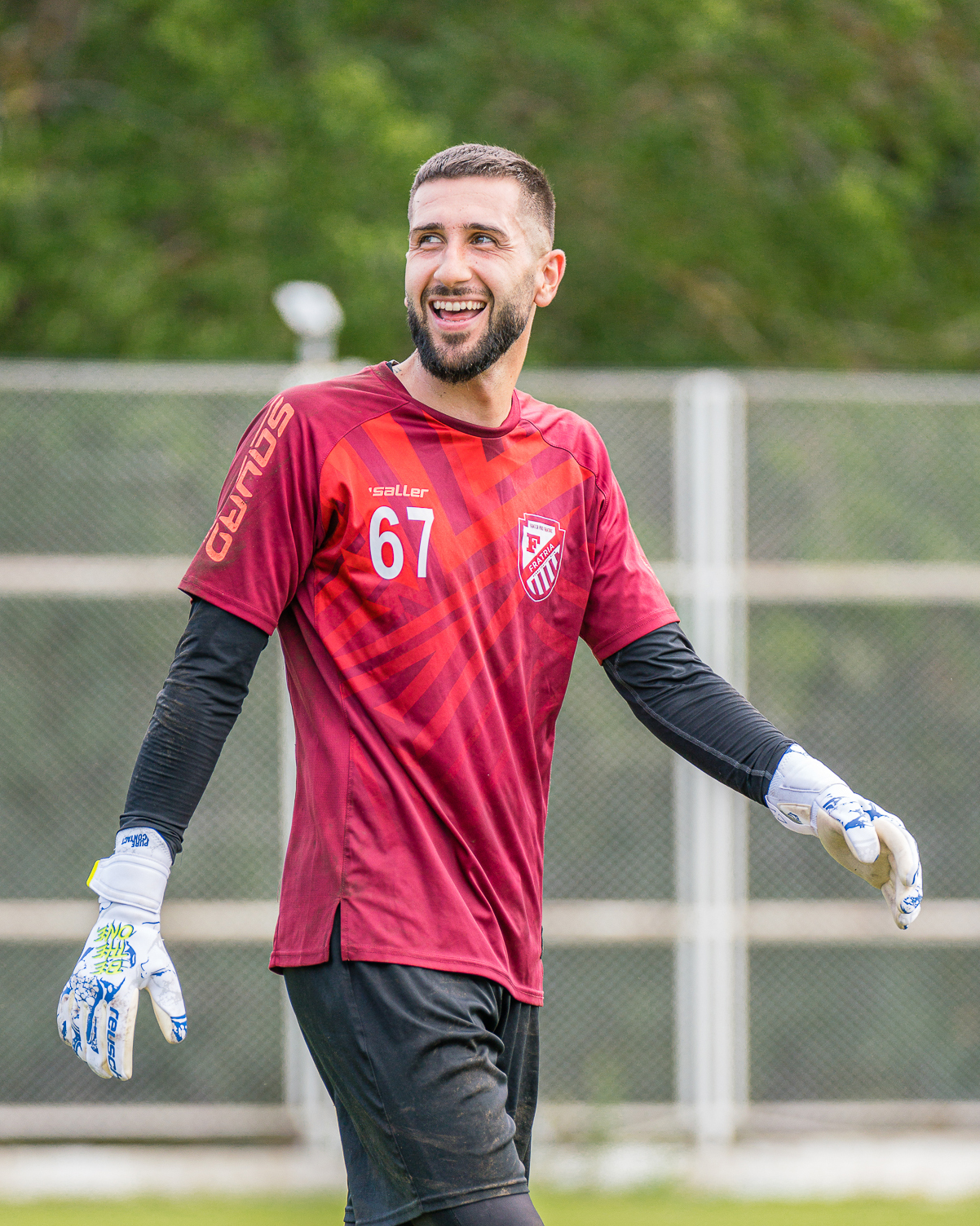
- Hristov warming up before match for Fratria in 2024.

Personal information
- Full name: Hristiyan Zhivkov Hristov
- Date of birth: 9 April 1995 (age 31)
- Place of birth: Varna, Bulgaria
- Height: 1.87 m (6 ft 2 in)
- Position: Goalkeeper

Team information
- Current team: Illueca

Youth career
- –2014: Cherno More

Senior career*
Years	Team	Apps	(Gls)
2013–2014	Cherno More	1	(0)
2015–2016	Inter Plachidol	21	(0)
2016–2020	Chernomorets Balchik	95	(0)
2020–2021	Lokomotiv GO	30	(0)
2021–2022	CSKA 1948 II	10	(0)
2021–2022	CSKA 1948	0	(0)
2022–2023	Spartak Varna	1	(0)
2023	Dobrudzha Dobrich	7	(0)
2023–2024	Fratria Varna	26	(0)
2025–	Illueca	20	(0)
- * Club domestic league appearances and goals as of 13:02, 23 March 2026 (UTC)

Hristiyan Hristov (Bulgarian: Християн Христов; born 9 April 1995) is a Bulgarian footballer who plays as a goalkeeper for Spanish Tercera Federación club Illueca.

== Career ==
Hristiyan started the 2013/14 season as Cherno More's third goalkeeper. In January 2014, Hristov was included in the 25-man squad for their training camp in Turkey. He made his first team league début in a 1–3 away defeat against Ludogorets on 18 May 2014, coming on as a substitute for Nik Dashev.

== Career statistics ==
As of 2 June 2024

Club performance			League		Cup		Continental		Other		Total	
Club	League	Season	Apps	Goals	Apps	Goals	Apps	Goals	Apps	Goals	Apps	Goals
Bulgaria			League		Bulgarian Cup		Europe		Other		Total	
Cherno More	A Group	2013–14	1	0	1	0	–		–		2	0
Cherno More	A Group	2014–15	0	0	0	0	0	0	–		0	0
Cherno More	Total		1	0	1	0	0	0	0	0	2	0
Inter Plachidol	V Group	2015–16	21	0	0	0	–		–		21	0
Inter Plachidol	Total		21	0	0	0	0	0	0	0	21	0
Chernomorets Balchik	Third League	2016–17	25	0	1	0	–		–		26	0
Chernomorets Balchik	Second League	2017–18	30	0	1	0	–		–		31	0
Chernomorets Balchik	Second League	2018–19	27	0	2	0	–		–		29	0
Chernomorets Balchik	Second League	2019–20	13	0	1	0	–		–		14	0
Chernomorets Balchik	Total		95	0	5	0	0	0	0	0	100	0
Lokomotiv GO	Second League	2020–21	30	0	–		–		–		30	0
CSKA 1948 II	Second League	2021–22	10	0	–		–		–		10	0
CSKA 1948	First League	2021–22	0	0	0	0	–		–		0	0
Spartak Varna	First League	2022–23	1	0	2	0	–		–		3	0
Dobrudzha Dobrich	Second League	2022–23	7	0	0	0	–		–		7	0
Fratria	Third League	2023–24	26	0	1	0	–		–		27	0
Career statistics			191	0	9	0	0	0	0	0	200	0
