= Pirgov =

Pirgov (Bulgarian: Пиргов) is a Bulgarian surname. Notable people with the surname include:

- Dimitar Pirgov (born 1989), Bulgarian footballer, brother of Ilko
- Ilko Pirgov (born 1986), Bulgarian footballer
