= Georgi Bozhilov =

Bulgarian professional footballer

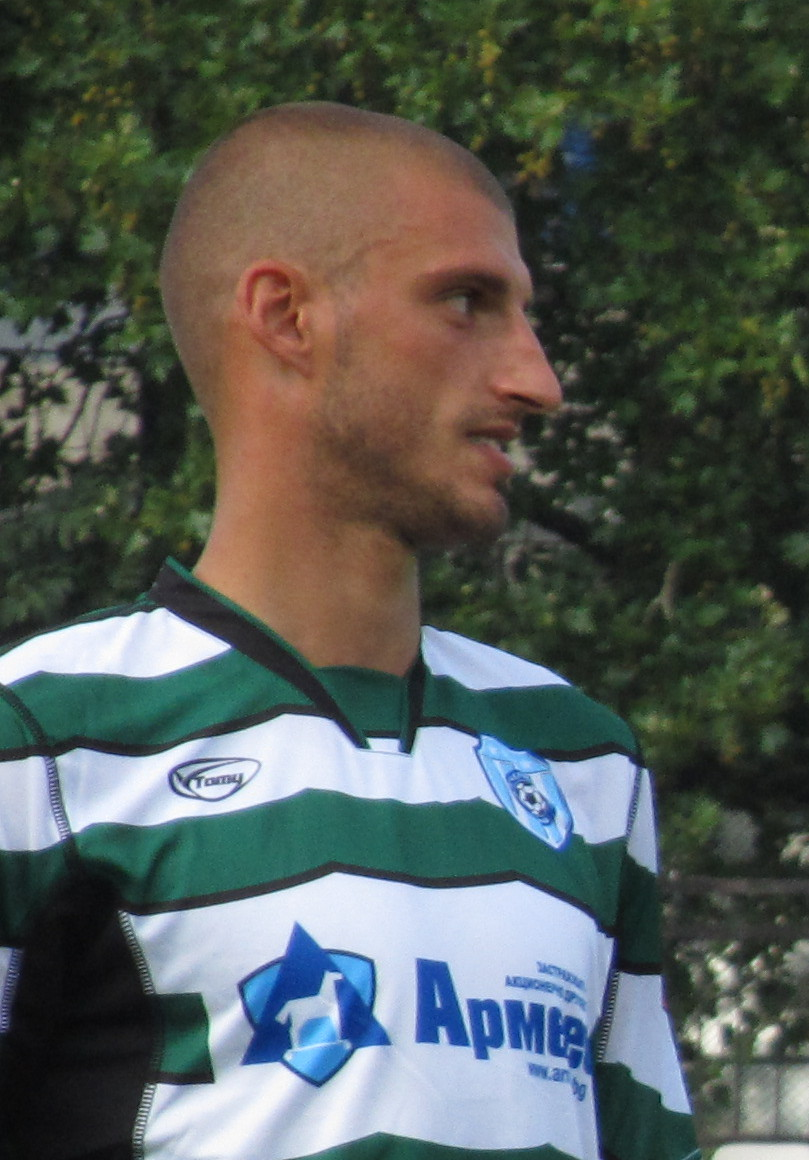

Personal information
- Full name: Georgi Penkov Bozhilov
- Date of birth: 12 February 1987 (age 39)
- Place of birth: Sofia, Bulgaria
- Height: 1.85 m (6 ft 1 in)
- Positions: Second striker; striker

Youth career
- –2002: Septemvri Sofia
- 2002–2004: CSKA Sofia

Senior career*
Years	Team	Apps	(Gls)
2004–2006	Naftex Burgas	21	(0)
2006–2010	Chernomorets Burgas	45	(7)
2009	→ Lokomotiv Plovdiv (loan)	5	(0)
2010–2015	Cherno More	139	(19)
2015–2017	Beroe Stara Zagora	50	(4)
2017–2021	Cherno More	36	(7)
2022	Marek Dupnitsa	29	(7)
2023	Chavdar Etropole	15	(1)
2023	Rilski Sportist	14	(2)
2024	Kostinbrod	17	(3)
2024–2025	Slivnishki Geroy	30	(5)
Total		401	(55)

International career
2011–2016	Bulgaria	2	(0)
- * Club domestic league appearances and goals

Georgi Penkov Bozhilov (Bulgarian: Георги Божилов, born 12 February 1987) is a Bulgarian former professional footballer. He has played much of his career as a second striker but he has also been used as a striker and as an attacking midfielder.

== Career ==
=== Early career ===
Born in Sofia, Bozhilov joined CSKA Sofia's Academy at the age of 15 having previously been at Septemvri Sofia. In 2004, he left CSKA's Academy and signed first professional contract with Naftex Burgas, together with his teammates Vladislav Stoyanov and Orlin Starokin.

=== Chernomorets Burgas ===
In June 2006, Bozhilov joined Chernomorets Burgas, but suffered a severe knee injury and missed all matches of the 2006–07 season. He made his league debut in a 6–1 away win at Belasitsa Petrich on 12 August 2007, coming on in the 81st minute as a substitute. Bozhilov then netted his first ever professional goal of his career in the league match against Lokomotiv Plovdiv on 6 October 2007, scoring the only goal in a 1–0 home win. He scored a total of 5 goals in 25 A Group games in the 2007–08 season.

==== Lokomotiv Plovdiv (loan) ====
On 31 August 2009, Bozhilov was loaned out to fellow A Group club Lokomotiv Plovdiv for four months. On 26 November, Bozhilov returned to Chernomorets after a hamstring injury.

=== Cherno More ===
On 24 January 2010, Bozhilov completed a move from Chernomorets to Cherno More, signing a long-term contract for an undisclosed fee. He made his competitive debut for Cherno More in a league game against Sliven 2000 on 8 March 2010, wearing the number 14. Bozhilov scored his first goal a week later, in a 3–2 home win over Lokomotiv Plovdiv.

On 7 January 2012, it was announced that Ukrainian Premier League side Zorya Luhansk had agreed a deal to sign Bozhilov. Five days later, Zorya however pulled out of the transfer after it was reported that he failed his medical with the club.

On 31 August 2013, Bozhilov hit his first goals of the 2013–14 season, scoring twice in the 3–1 home win against Ludogorets Razgrad. He made his 100th league appearance for Cherno More in a 1–0 away win at Neftochimic Burgas on 14 September.

=== Beroe ===
In June 2015, Bozhilov signed a contract with Beroe Stara Zagora as a free agent, after his contract had expired with Cherno More at the end of the 2014–15 season. He scored on his competitive debut for Beroe on 2 July, scoring the second in a 2–0 away victory over Atlantas in the first qualifying round of the 2015–16 Europa League.

=== Return to Cherno More ===
On 14 June 2017, Bozhilov re-joined Cherno More Varna. On 15 July, he scored the winner in his second debut for the team in a 1–0 home win over Vitosha Bistritsa.

== International career ==
On 2 September 2011, Bozhilov made his debut for the Bulgarian national team, when he came on as a substitute in a Euro 2012 qualifying match against England for the final 28 minutes.

== Career statistics ==
As of 24 May 2021

Club	Season	League		Cup		Europe		Total	
Club	Season	Apps	Goals	Apps	Goals	Apps	Goals	Apps	Goals
Naftex	2004–05	11	0	2	0	–	–	13	0
Naftex	2005–06	10	0	1	0	–	–	11	0
Chernomorets Burgas	2006–07	0	0	0	0	–	–	0	0
Chernomorets Burgas	2007–08	25	5	2	1	–	–	27	6
Chernomorets Burgas	2008–09	20	2	1	0	–	–	21	2
Lokomotiv Plovdiv	2009–10	5	0	0	0	–	–	5	0
Cherno More	2009–10	10	3	1	0	–	–	11	3
Cherno More	2010–11	28	4	3	0	–	–	31	4
Cherno More	2011–12	27	3	1	0	–	–	28	3
Cherno More	2012–13	27	5	3	0	–	–	30	5
Cherno More	2013–14	27	3	0	0	–	–	27	3
Cherno More	2014–15	20	1	1	0	–	–	21	1
Beroe	2015–16	29	2	5	0	4	1	38	3
Beroe	2016–17	21	2	1	0	4	0	26	2
Cherno More	2017–18	20	3	1	0	–	–	21	3
Cherno More	2018–19	15	4	2	1	–	–	17	5
Cherno More	2019–20	0	0	0	0	–	–	0	0
Cherno More	2020–21	2	0	0	0	–	–	2	0
Career totals		296	37	24	2	8	1	328	40

== Honours ==
=== Club ===
Cherno More

- Bulgarian Cup: 2014–15
