= Petko Tsankov =

Bulgarian footballer

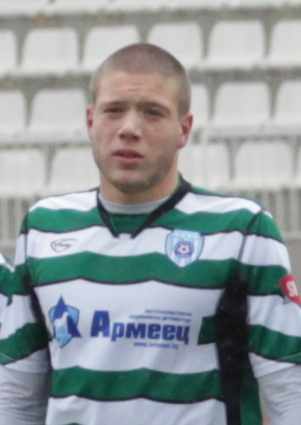

Personal information
- Full name: Petko Valentinov Tsankov
- Date of birth: 19 December 1995 (age 30)
- Place of birth: Varna, Bulgaria
- Height: 1.80 m (5 ft 11 in)
- Positions: Right-back; right winger

Team information
- Current team: Aksakovo

Youth career
- –2014: Cherno More

Senior career*
Years	Team	Apps	(Gls)
2013–2014	Cherno More	1	(0)
2014–2015	Kaliakra Kavarna	26	(9)
2015	Dobrudzha Dobrich	16	(1)
2016	Chernomorets Balchik	21	(2)
2017–2019	Vitosha Bistritsa	60	(4)
2019	Beroe	2	(0)
2020	Dunav Ruse	9	(0)
2020–2021	Lokomotiv GO	24	(0)
2021–2022	Ludogorets Razgrad II	32	(0)
2022–2024	Dobrudzha	48	(3)
2024	Dorostol	16	(4)
2025–	Aksakovo	10	(2)
- * Club domestic league appearances and goals as of 08:27, 18 June 2025 (UTC)

Petko Tsankov (Bulgarian: Петко Цанков; born 19 December 1995) is a Bulgarian professional footballer who plays as a right winger for Aksakovo.

== Career ==
Tsankov made his first team début in a goalless away draw with Marek (Bulgarian Cup 1st round) on 18 September 2013, coming on as substitute for Ivan Kokonov. A few days later, he made his first A Group appearance in a 2–1 home win against Pirin Gotse Delchev on 29 September, again replacing Kokonov.

In February 2017, Tsankov joined Bulgarian Second League outfit Vitosha Bistritsa.

== Career statistics ==
As of 6 June 2019

Club	League	Season	League		Cup		Continental		Other		Total	
Club	League	Season	Apps	Goals	Apps	Goals	Apps	Goals	Apps	Goals	Apps	Goals
Cherno More	First League	2013–14	1	0	1	0	—	—	—	—	2	0
Kaliakra	Third League	2014–15	26	9	—	—	—	—	—	—	26	9
Dobrudzha	Second League	2015–16	16	1	1	0	—	—	—	—	17	1
Chernomorets Balchik	Third League	2015–16	9	2	0	0	—	—	—	—	9	2
Chernomorets Balchik	Third League	2016–17	12	0	1	0	—	—	—	—	13	0
Vitosha Bistritsa	Second League	2016–17	12	3	0	0	—	—	1 (Note: Promotion Play-off)	0	13	3
Vitosha Bistritsa	First League	2017–18	26	1	0	0	—	—	4 (Note: Relegation Play-offs)	0	30	1
Vitosha Bistritsa	First League	2018–19	22	0	2	0	—	—	2 (Note: Relegation Play-offs)	0	26	0
Beroe	First League	2019–20	2	0	1	0	—	—	—	—	3	0
Career statistics			126	16	6	0	0	0	7	0	139	16
