= Dimitar Petkov (footballer) =

Bulgarian footballer

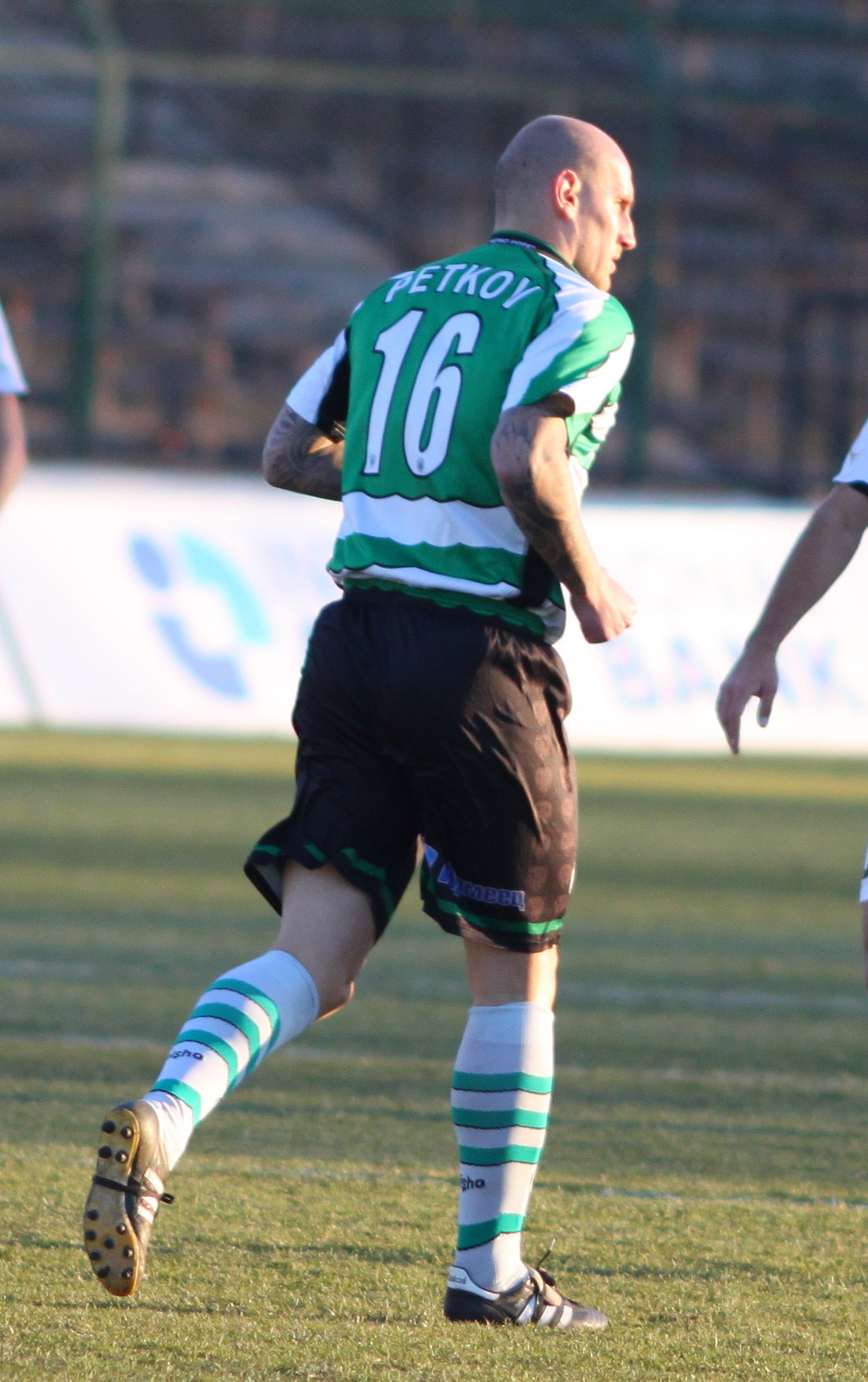
- Petkov playing for Cherno More in 2011

Personal information
- Full name: Dimitar Ivanov Petkov
- Date of birth: 24 August 1987 (age 39)
- Place of birth: Blagoevgrad, Bulgaria
- Height: 1.85 m (6 ft 1 in)
- Position: Defensive midfielder

Team information
- Current team: Pirin Razlog
- Number: 16

Senior career*
Years	Team	Apps	(Gls)
2006–2007	Minyor Pernik	16	(0)
2008	Slavia Sofia	1	(0)
2008–2010	CSKA Sofia	1	(0)
2009	→ Botev Plovdiv (loan)	4	(0)
2009–2010	→ Lokomotiv Mezdra (loan)	22	(3)
2010–2011	Cherno More	31	(1)
2012	Bdin	9	(0)
2012	Montana	12	(0)
2013	Zestaponi	4	(0)
2013	Aris Limassol	5	(0)
2014	Tiraspol	6	(1)
2014–2015	Marek	19	(1)
2015	Septemvri Simitli	15	(0)
2016	Elpida Xylofagou	10	(2)
2016	Botev Vratsa	12	(0)
2017–2018	Tsarsko Selo	31	(2)
2018–2019	Vihren Sandanski	31	(8)
2019	Atlantas	15	(0)
2020–2021	Dacia Unirea Brăila	0	(0)
2021-2022	Vihren	0	(0)
2023-	Pirin Razlog	0	(0)
- * Club domestic league appearances and goals as of 29 November 2019

Dimitar Petkov (Bulgarian: Димитър Петков; born 24 August 1987) is a Bulgarian footballer who plays as a defensive midfielder for FC Pirin Razlog.
