= Dimo Atanasov =

Bulgarian footballer

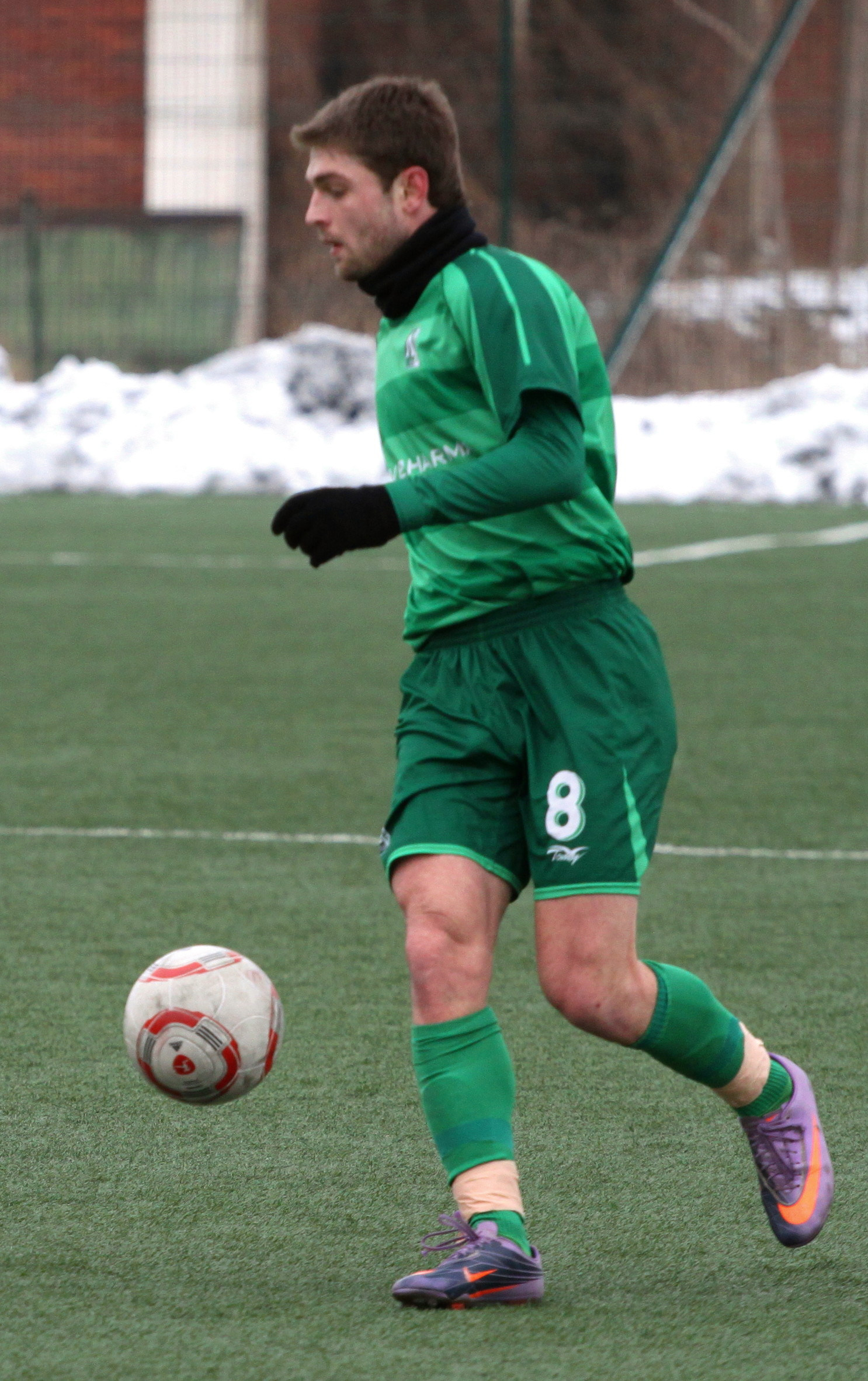
- Atanasov playing for Ludogorets in 2011

Personal information
- Full name: Dimo Atanasov Atanasov
- Date of birth: 24 October 1985 (age 41)
- Place of birth: Pavlikeni, Bulgaria
- Height: 1.78 m (5 ft 10 in)
- Positions: Left-back; left winger

Youth career
- Etar Veliko Tarnovo
- Pavlikeni

Senior career*
Years	Team	Apps	(Gls)
2003–2010	Lokomotiv Sofia	145	(14)
2011	Ludogorets Razgrad	17	(3)
2012	Botev Plovdiv	11	(2)
2012	Lokomotiv Plovdiv	13	(1)
2013	Slavia Sofia	27	(1)
2014	Cherno More	20	(1)
2015	Marek Dupnitsa	10	(0)
2015	Vereya	7	(0)
2016	Spartak Pleven	12	(0)
2016	Lokomotiv GO	15	(2)
2017–2018	Etar	45	(0)
2019–2020	CSKA 1948	35	(0)
2020–2021	Lokomotiv GO	25	(0)
2022	Pavlikeni	15	(2)

International career
2004–2006	Bulgaria U21		
- * Club domestic league appearances and goals

Dimo Atanasov (Bulgarian: Димо Атанасов; born 24 October 1985) is a former Bulgarian professional footballer who played as a left-back or left winger.

== Club career ==
In June 2003, Atanasov joined Lokomotiv Sofia on a four-year contract for an undisclosed fee. On 12 November 2003, he made his Lokomotiv debut in a 3–0 victory against Sliven 2000 in the Bulgarian Cup Third Round, coming on as a substitute for Radoslav Ivanov. Atanasov spent 7 seasons of his career at the club of Sofia, playing in 142 games and scoring 14 goals in A PFG.

On 24 January 2011, it was announced that Atanasov had signed with Ludogorets Razgrad on a 2 1/2-year contract.

In February 2017, Atanasov joined Etar Veliko Tarnovo.

== International career ==
Atanasov also played for the Bulgaria national under-21 football team and scored 2 goals – one in a friendly game against Republic of Macedonia and one in a qualification against Ukraine.

== Career statistics ==
As of 15 May 2011

Club	Season	League		Cup		Europe		Total	
Club	Season	Apps	Goals	Apps	Goals	Apps	Goals	Apps	Goals
Lokomotiv Sofia	2003–04	11	0	3	0	–	–	14	0
Lokomotiv Sofia	2004–05	6	0	2	1	–	–	8	1
Lokomotiv Sofia	2005–06	16	0	1	0	–	–	17	0
Lokomotiv Sofia	2006–07	28	6	0	0	5	0	33	6
Lokomotiv Sofia	2007–08	20	2	0	0	2	0	22	2
Lokomotiv Sofia	2008–09	29	3	1	0	1	1	31	4
Lokomotiv Sofia	2009–10	25	3	1	0	–	–	26	3
Lokomotiv Sofia	2010–11	10	0	0	0	–	–	9	0
Ludogorets Razgrad	2010–11	8	3	0	0	–	–	8	3
Career totals		153	17	8	1	8	1	169	19
