= Anderson Gonçalves =

Brazilian footballer (born 1980)

Personal information
- Full name: Anderson Gonçalves Pedro
- Date of birth: 17 May 1980 (age 46)
- Place of birth: Espírito Santo do Pinha, São Paulo, Brazil
- Height: 1.83 m (6 ft 0 in)
- Position: Midfielder

Senior career*
Years	Team	Apps	(Gls)
2000–2001	Rio Preto		
2002	Jataiense		
2003–2004	Guaçuano		
2005	Botafogo		
2005–2007	Pogoń Szczecin	21	(2)
2007	Zagłębie Lubin	3	(0)
2007	São Caetano		
2008–2009	Petržalka	17	(0)
2009	Luverdense		
2010	Mogi Mirim		
2010	São Bento		
2011	Montana	10	(1)
2012	Itapirense		
- * Club domestic league appearances and goals

Anderson Gonçalves Pedro (born 17 May 1980) is a Brazilian former professional footballer who played as a midfielder.

== Honours ==
Zagłębie Lubin

- Ekstraklasa: 2006–07
