= Emil Grozev =

Bulgarian footballer

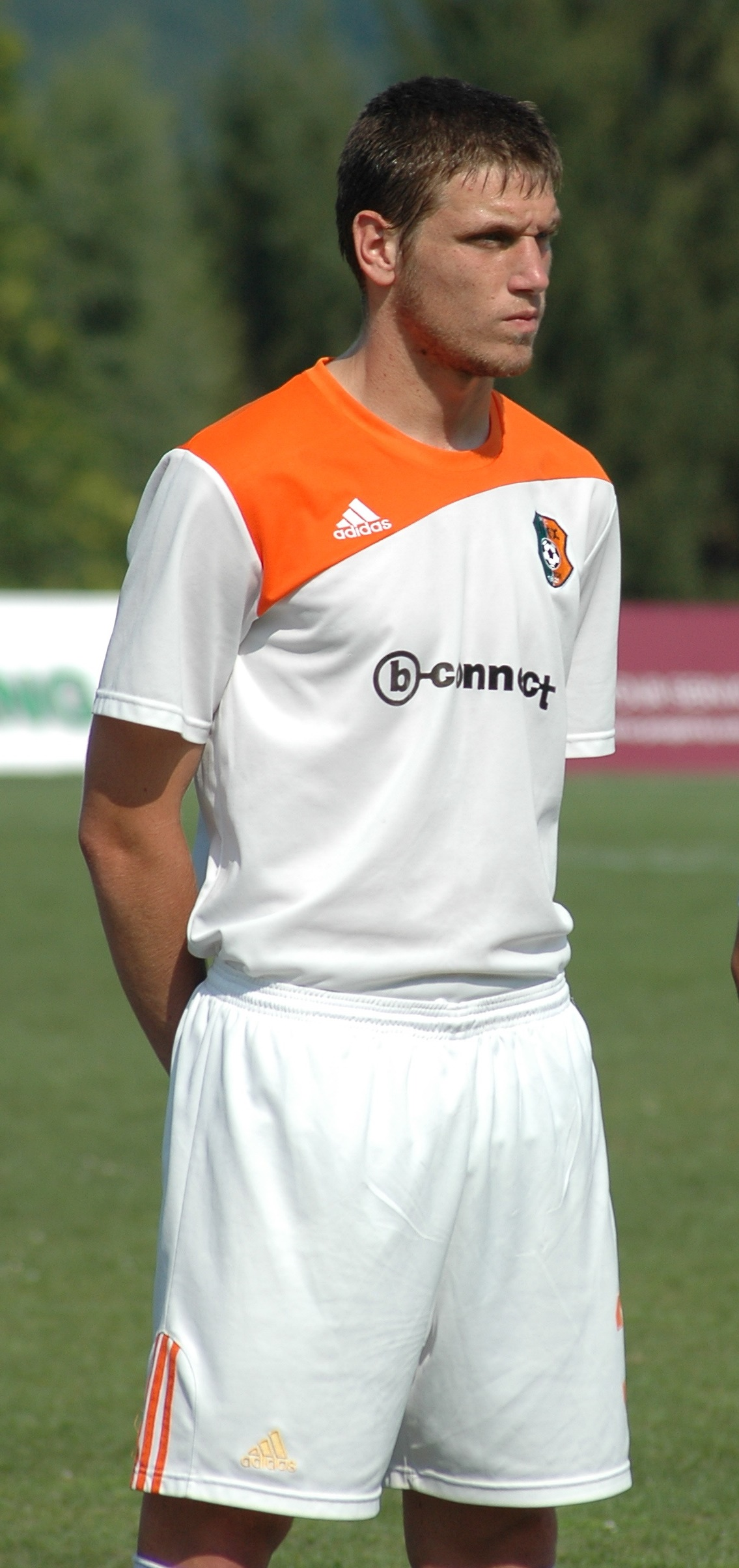

Personal information
- Full name: Emil Antonov Grozev
- Date of birth: 15 March 1991 (age 35)
- Place of birth: Lovech, Bulgaria
- Height: 1.91 m (6 ft 3 in)
- Position: Centre back

Team information
- Current team: FC Botev Lukovit
- Number: 4

Youth career
- Litex Lovech

Senior career*
Years	Team	Apps	(Gls)
2008–2014	Litex Lovech	9	(2)
2010–2011	→ Brestnik 1948 (loan)	17	(1)
2011	→ Chavdar BS (loan)	14	(0)
2012	→ Chavdar Etropole (loan)	9	(0)
2014	→ Lyubimets 2007 (loan)	13	(0)
2015	Vereya	1	(0)
2016	Botev Vratsa	6	(0)
2016–2017	Litex Lovech	4	(1)
2017–	FC Botev Lukovit	0	(0)
- * Club domestic league appearances and goals as of 11 August 2017

Emil Grozev (Bulgarian: Емил Грозев; born 15 March 1991) is a Bulgarian footballer currently playing as a defender for FC Botev Lukovit.
