= Bacari =

Gambian footballer

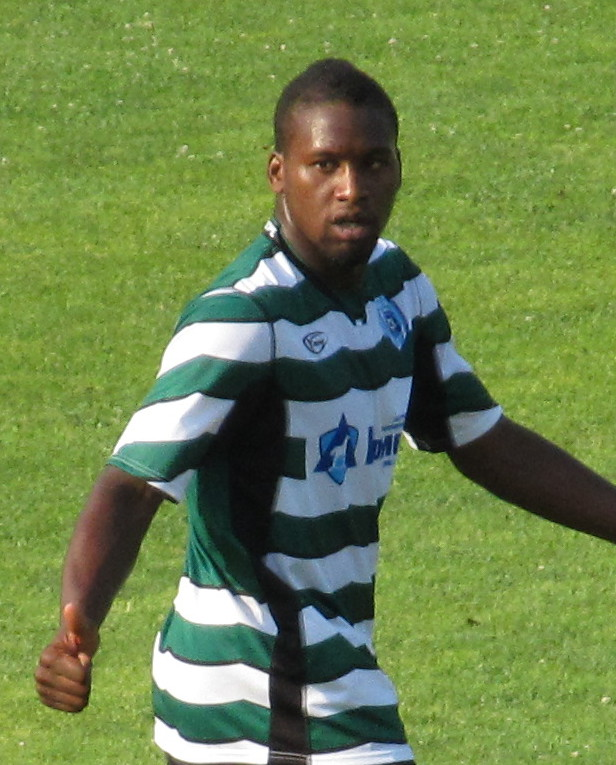
- Bacari playing with Cherno More in 2013

Personal information
- Full name: Bubacar Njie Kambi
- Date of birth: 14 March 1988 (age 38)
- Place of birth: Mataró, Spain
- Height: 1.78 m (5 ft 10 in)
- Position: Forward

Team information
- Current team: Martinenc

Youth career
- 1999–2006: Espanyol
- 2006–2007: Mataró

Senior career*
Years	Team	Apps	(Gls)
2007–2009	Premià	33	(13)
2009	Zaragoza B	11	(1)
2009–2011	Valladolid B	51	(28)
2011	Valladolid	8	(1)
2011–2012	Espanyol B	28	(20)
2012	Espanyol	1	(0)
2012–2013	Hospitalet	33	(13)
2013–2017	Cherno More	76	(19)
2018–2019	San Fernando	28	(4)
2019	Linense	15	(2)
2019–2020	Vilassar Mar	19	(3)
2020–2022	Sant Julià	39	(18)
2022–2023	Mataró	37	(18)
2023–	Martinenc	12	(4)

International career
2016	Gambia	1	(0)
- * Club domestic league appearances and goals as of 15:03, 1 June 2024 (UTC)

Bubacar Njie Kambi (born 14 March 1988), known as Bacari, is a Gambian footballer who plays as a forward for Andorran club UE Sant Julià.

== Club career ==
Born in Mataró, Barcelona, Catalonia, to Gambian parents, Bacari played for four clubs as a youth (all in his native region, mainly RCD Espanyol), finishing his development at CE Mataró and starting his career as a central defender, being known as Buba. He made his senior debut with CE Premià, then spent two and a half seasons with Real Zaragoza and Real Valladolid's reserve teams.

Bacari made his official debut with Valladolid's main squad on 20 March 2011, coming on as a substitute for Álvaro Antón for the last eight minutes of the 1–0 Segunda División home victory over Girona FC. He contributed one goal in 131 minutes during the campaign, as the Castile and León side finished in seventh position.

In July 2011, Bacari signed with RCD Espanyol B. On 3 December he made his first La Liga appearance with the first team, replacing Álvaro Vázquez in the dying minutes of a 2–1 away defeat against Valencia CF. On 20 July of the following year, he joined CE L'Hospitalet in the Segunda División B.

After being Hospi's second top scorer during his only season, only behind Sergio Cirio, Bacari moved to Bulgaria with PFC Cherno More Varna. On 30 May 2015, he scored a last-minute equalising goal in the Bulgarian Cup Final against PFC Levski Sofia to force extra time; his team went on to win 2–1. On 29 May 2017, after four First Professional Football League campaigns and an average of five goals, his contract was terminated by mutual consent.

Bacari returned to Spain and its third tier in the 2018 January transfer window, agreeing to a deal at San Fernando CD. He continued to play in the lower leagues the following years, with Real Balompédica Linense and UE Vilassar de Mar.

== International career ==
Bacari made his debut for Gambia on 4 June 2016, starting in a 0–4 home loss against South Africa in the 2017 Africa Cup of Nations qualifiers.

== Club statistics ==
As of 5 March 2017

Club	Season	League			Cup		Other		Total	
Club	Season	Division	Apps	Goals	Apps	Goals	Apps	Goals	Apps	Goals
Valladolid	2010–11	Segunda División	8	1	0	0	1 (Note: Appearances in promotion play-offs)	0	9	1
Espanyol	2011–12	La Liga	1	0	0	0	—		1	0
Hospitalet	2012–13	Segunda División B	33	13	1	0	6	0	40	13
Cherno More	2013–14	First Professional League	35	11	3	0	—		38	11
Cherno More	2014–15	First Professional League	12	1	5	2	—		17	3
Cherno More	2015–16	First Professional League	11	3	0	0	0	0	11	3
Cherno More	2016–17	First Professional League	18	4	1	1	—		19	5
Cherno More	Total		76	19	9	3	0	0	85	22
Career total			118	33	10	3	7	0	135	36

== Honours ==
Cherno More

- Bulgarian Cup: 2014–15
