= Edenilson Bergonsi =

Brazilian footballer (born 1987)

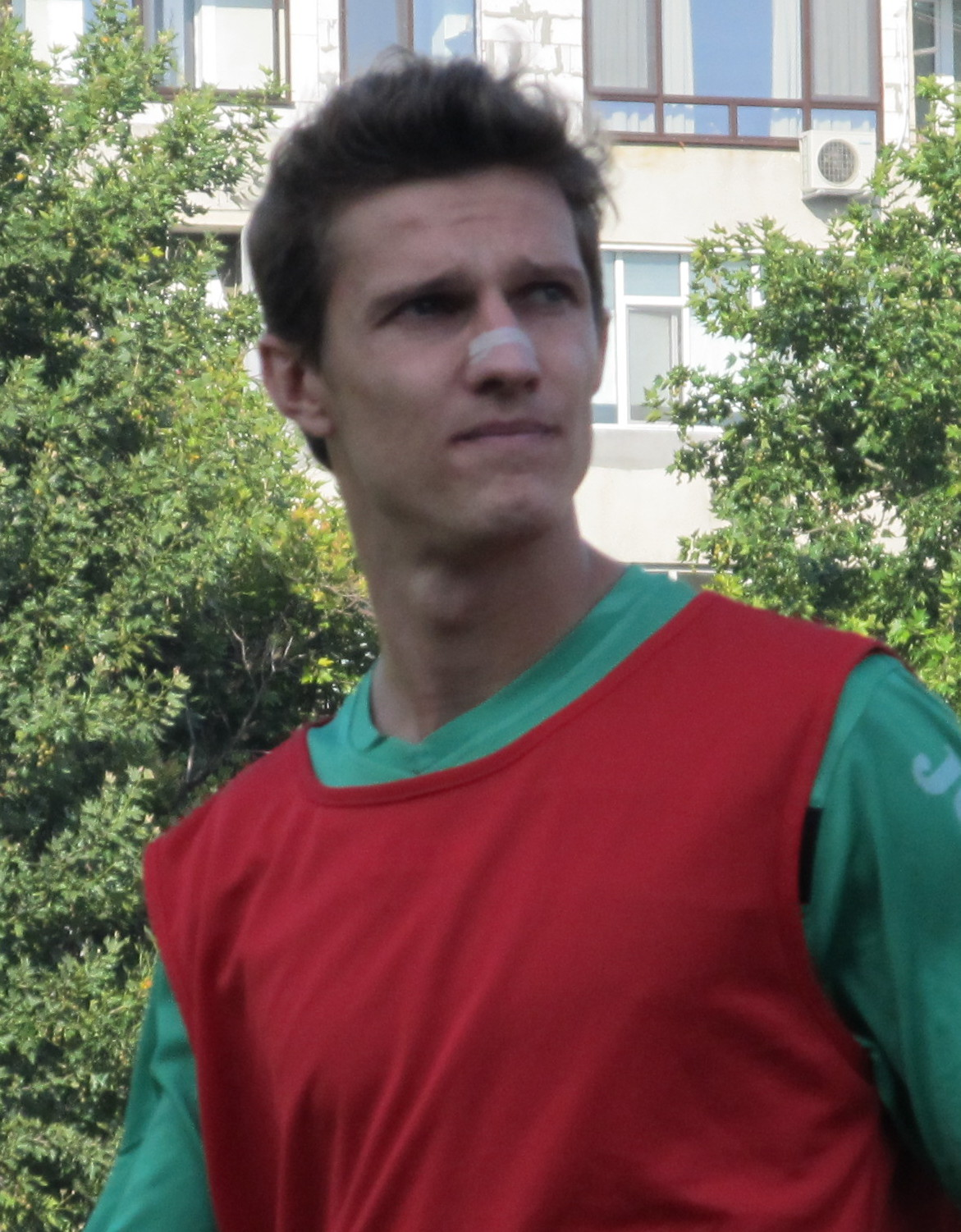
- Edenilson with Cherno More in 2013

Personal information
- Full name: Edenilson Bergonsi
- Date of birth: 13 September 1987 (age 39)
- Place of birth: Carlos Barbosa, Brazil
- Height: 1.85 m (6 ft 1 in)
- Position: Midfielder

Youth career
- Grêmio
- –2007: Ulbra

Senior career*
Years	Team	Apps	(Gls)
2007	Mogi Mirim	2	(0)
2007–2008	Esportivo	3	(0)
2008	Cerâmica	0	(0)
2009	Brasil de Pelotas	12	(1)
2009–2010	Juventude	11	(0)
2010	Varese	0	(0)
2011	RWDM Brussels	11	(2)
2011–2012	Standard Liège	0	(0)
2012–2014	Cherno More	59	(7)
2014–2015	CSKA Sofia	11	(1)
2015–2016	Pirin Blagoevgrad	3	(0)
2016–2017	Drita	4	(1)
2017	Eldense	7	(0)
2017–2018	Enosis Neon Paralimni	10	(1)
2018	Drita	4	(0)
2019	Boa Esporte	7	(0)
2019	Atlético Terme Fiuggi	6	(0)
2020	FK Panevėžys	16	(1)
2021	São Luiz	5	(0)
2021–2022	Bruno's Magpies	16	(2)
- * Club domestic league appearances and goals as of 2025

Edenilson Bergonsi (born 13 September 1987), sometimes known as just Edenilson, is a Brazilian professional footballer who plays as a midfielder for Gibraltar National League side Bruno's Magpies. He also holds Italian nationality.

== Club career ==
=== Brazil ===
Edenilson Bergonsi started his professional career at Mogi Mirim of Campeonato Paulista Série A2 before returned to native Rio Grande do Sul state in March 2007. He played for Esportivo in 2007 Campeonato Brasileiro Série C and moved to Cerâmica on 26 September 2008, which finished as the runner-up of 2008 Copa FGF. He also trailed for Legnano at the start of 2008–09 season.

In December 2008, he was signed by Brasil de Pelotas in 1-year contract. He left for Juventude after the end of 2009 Campeonato Gaúcho. He only played 3 times in 2009 Campeonato Brasileiro Série B, and 8 times in 2010 Campeonato Gaúcho.

=== Europe ===
==== Varese ====
In July 2010, Edenilson Bergonsi joined Italian club Varese, but failed to make a single appearance in the Serie B. He only played 4 games in the reserve league as an overage player.

==== Brussels ====
In January 2011, Edenilson Bergonsi left for Belgian Second Division side FC Brussels along with teammate Café. He made his debut for Brussels in their match against Rupel Boom on 4 February, coming on as a second-half substitute for Sébastien Siani. He scored his first two goals in a 3–2 win against Waasland-Beveren at Edmond Machtens Stadium on 19 March. Edenilson ended the season with 11 appearances.

==== Bulgaria ====
On 30 July 2012, Edenilson Bergonsi signed with Bulgarian A Professional Football Group club Cherno More on a three-year deal. In June 2014, Bergonsi joined CSKA Sofia on a one-year contract. In February 2015, he sustained a meniscus injury that kept him out of action until the end of the season. On 1 July he again became ready for play. Following the 2015/16 season, Edenilson's contract with Pirin Blagoevgrad was not renewed.

==== Drita ====
On 8 November 2016, Edenilson Bergonsi signed with Football Superleague of Kosovo club Drita.

==== CD Eldense ====
On 18 January 2017, Edenilson Bergonsi signed with club CD Eldense.

==== Enosis Neon Paralimni ====
On 1 July 2017, Edenilson Bergonsi signed with club Enosis Neon Paralimni.

==== Boa Esporte FC ====
On 5 January 2019 sign to Boa Esporte Brazil team, he played Campeonato Mineiro and win Campeonato do Interior Mineiro.

==== Atletico Termo Fiuggi ====
On 15 July 2019 Edenilson Bergonsi come back To Italy, in Atletico Termo Fiuggi.

==== FK Panevezys ====
On 10 January 2020, Edenilson Bergonsi signed with Lithuanian A Lyga club FK Panevėžys. During 2020 season he played 16 matches and scored one goal in the league. With the club he won 2020 Lithuanian Football Cup.

==== Bruno's Magpies ====
In November 2021. after a stint with Esporte Clube São Luiz back in Brazil, he moved to Gibraltar to join Bruno's Magpies. He scored on his debut, against Lions Gibraltar in a 3–2 win on 20 November 2021.
