= Tanko Dyakov =

Bulgarian footballer

Personal information
- Full name: Tanko Bozhidarov Dyakov
- Date of birth: 18 August 1984 (age 42)
- Place of birth: Stara Zagora, Bulgaria
- Height: 1.94 m (6 ft 4 in)
- Position: Centre back

Youth career
- Beroe Stara Zagora

Senior career*
Years	Team	Apps	(Gls)
2002–2003	Beroe Stara Zagora	0	(0)
2003–2004	Levski Hyunday	28	(1)
2004–2005	Minyor Radnevo	26	(4)
2005–2006	Slavia Sofia	16	(0)
2006	Minyor Radnevo	7	(1)
2007–2008	Vihren Sandanski	35	(6)
2008–2011	Cherno More	77	(2)
2011	Lokomotiv Sofia	8	(0)
2012	Lokomotiv Plovdiv	8	(1)
2012–2013	Zhetysu	7	(0)
2013	Lyubimets 2007	6	(0)
2014–2015	Beroe Stara Zagora	8	(0)
- * Club domestic league appearances and goals

Tanko Dyakov (Bulgarian: Танко Дяков; born 18 August 1984) is a former Bulgarian footballer who played as a defender.

== Career ==
=== Early career ===
Born in Stara Zagora, Dyakov started his career at Beroe, a club from his hometown, for which he made 16 appearances, scoring one goal, but lack of first team opportunities prompted a move to Levski Hyunday in July 2003. Year later he was transferred to Minyor Radnevo. After a good season at Minyor, Dyakov was scouted by Slavia Sofia.

=== Slavia ===
In June 2005 Dyakov signed a contract at Slavia until 30 June 2008. He made his debut in A PFG during the 2005–06 season on 7 August 2005 in a 2–0 home win against Pirin Blagoevgrad, coming on as a substitute for Blagoy Georgiev. In this season, Tanko earned 16 appearances in the A PFG.

After the end of the season the new Slavia coach Ratko Dostanić informed him that he would not be a first-team regular from then on with this resulting in his pushing for a move to another club.

In July 2006, Dyakov was signed by his previously club AKB Minyor Radnevo for an undisclosed fee. He marked his re-debut for Minyor with goal in a 2–4 away loss against Shumen.

=== Vihren ===
In January 2007, Dyakov signed a two-a-half-year deal with Vihren Sandanski. He made his debut on 3 March 2007, playing 90 minutes of a 0–1 away loss against Lokomotiv Sofia and scored his first goal for the team as they beat Marek Dupnitsa 1–0 on 21 March. On 27 May Tanko scored twice for a 2–0 home win against his first club Beroe.

On 15 September 2007, Dyakov scored his first goal of the 2007–08 season against Vidima-Rakovski. On 10 November, Tanko hit his second goal of the campaign. This time he scored the first Vihren goal in the 3–1 win against Marek Dupnitsa. On 19 April 2008, Dyakov scored his last goal for Vihren against Lokomotiv Plovdiv.

After a good season at Vihren, he was wanted by Cherno More Varna and Greek Aris Thessaloniki. On 1 June 2008 it was announced that Dyakov will be joining Cherno More.

=== Cherno More ===
On 3 June 2008, Dyakov signed a 3 years contract with Cherno More for a transfer fee of €60,000. He took over the number 6 jersey. Tanko made his debut for the Sailors on 17 July 2008 against UE Sant Julià of the UEFA Cup, coming on as a substitute for Nikolay Domakinov. He made his A PFG debut during the 2008–09 season on 17 August 2010 in a 2–0 home win against Vihren Sandanski. On 18 September 2008, Dyakov scored his first goal (with a powerful header) against VfB Stuttgart in the first round of the UEFA Cup, but Cherno More were eventually eliminated after an aggregate score of 3:4.

In January 2011, Dyakov underwent an unsuccessful trial with Russian club Krasnodar.

=== Lokomotiv Sofia ===
On 22 June 2011, Dyakov signed a 2 years contract with Lokomotiv Sofia after his contract expired. Tanko expressed his decision to play for Lokomotiv because this is one of the best Bulgarian teams and is a great opportunity to play in Europa League.

=== Lokomotiv Plovdiv ===
After that Dyakov had a short stint with Loko Plovdiv.

=== Zhetysu ===
In July 2012, Dyakov signed with Zhetysu in the Kazakhstan Premier League until the end of the year, as he had failed to agree further terms with Loko Plovdiv.

=== Lyubimets ===
In late August 2013, Dyakov put pen to paper on a short-term contract with newly promoted A PFG club Lyubimets 2007.

=== Beroe ===
In the summer of 2014, after six months without a club, Dyakov joined Beroe.

== Club statistics ==
As of 30 May 2012

Club	Season	League		Cup		Europe		Total	
Club	Season	Apps	Goals	Apps	Goals	Apps	Goals	Apps	Goals
Beroe	2002–03	0	0	0	0	-	-	0	0
Levski Hyunday	2003–04	28	1	0	0	-	-	28	1
AKB Minyor	2004–05	26	4	0	0	-	-	26	4
Slavia	2005–06	16	0	0	0	-	-	16	0
AKB Minyor	2006–07	7	1	0	0	-	-	7	1
Vihren	2006–07	11	3	1	0	-	-	12	3
Vihren	2007–08	24	3	2	0	-	-	26	3
Cherno More	2008–09	25	0	1	0	6	1	32	1
Cherno More	2009–10	24	1	3	1	1	0	28	2
Cherno More	2010–11	28	1	2	0	-	-	30	1
Lokomotiv Sofia	2011–12	8	0	0	0	3	0	11	0
Lokomotiv Plovdiv	2011–12	8	1	2	0	-	-	10	1
Career totals		205	15	11	1	10	1	226	17
