= Yulian Petkov =

Bulgarian footballer

Personal information
- Full name: Yulian Dimitrov Petkov
- Date of birth: 20 June 1979 (age 47)
- Place of birth: Sofia, Bulgaria
- Height: 1.74 m (5 ft 9 in)
- Position: Defensive midfielder

Youth career
- Lokomotiv Sofia

Senior career*
Years	Team	Apps	(Gls)
1997–1999	FC Iskar	?	(?)
1999–2000	Levski Sofia	7	(0)
2000–2002	Spartak Pleven	49	(3)
2002–2007	Lokomotiv Sofia	76	(0)
2007–2008	Kaliakra Kavarna	23	(0)
2008–2011	Akademik Sofia	68	(1)
2011	Kaliakra Kavarna	13	(0)
2012	Lokomotiv Sofia	12	(0)
2013	Lokomotiv Mezdra	10	(0)
2015	Lokomotiv 1929 Sofia	3	(0)
- * Club domestic league appearances and goals as of 6 December 2015

Yulian Dimitrov Petkov (Bulgarian: Юлиян Димитров Петков, born 20 June 1979) is a retired Bulgarian footballer who last played as a midfielder for Lokomotiv 1929 Sofia.

Petkov previously played for Levski Sofia, Spartak Pleven, Lokomotiv Sofia, Kaliakra Kavarna and Akademik Sofia.
