= Rosen Kolev =

Bulgarian footballer (born 1990)

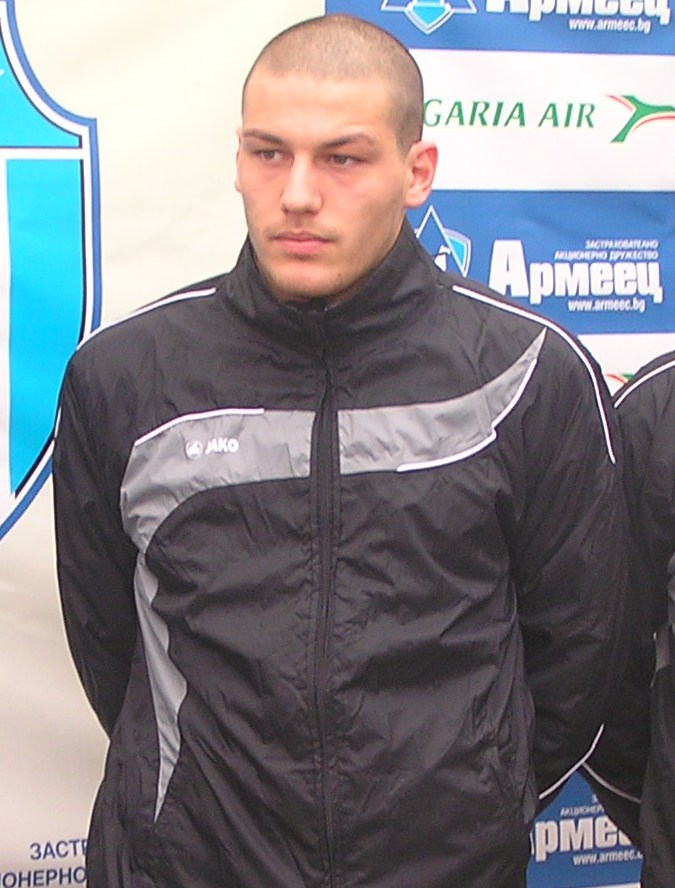
- Kolev in 2011

Personal information
- Full name: Rosen Rosenov Kolev
- Date of birth: 4 July 1990 (age 36)
- Place of birth: Sofia, Bulgaria
- Height: 1.87 m (6 ft 2 in)
- Position: Centre-back

Youth career
- CSKA Sofia

Senior career*
| Years | Team | Apps | (Gls) |
| 2008–2010 | CSKA Sofia | 0 | (0) |
| 2010 | → Bdin Vidin (loan) | 10 | (1) |
| 2010 | Kom-Minyor | 16 | (2) |
| 2011–2013 | Cherno More | 64 | (4) |
| 2014–2015 | Botev Plovdiv | 13 | (0) |
| 2015–2016 | Volga Nizhny Novgorod | 20 | (1) |
| 2016–2017 | Yenisey Krasnoyarsk | 24 | (0) |
| 2017–2019 | Pegasus | 27 | (1) |
| 2019–2022 | Dunav Ruse | 17 | (0) |

International career
| 2011–2012 | Bulgaria U21 | 12 | (2) |
- * Club domestic league appearances and goals

Rosen Rosenov Kolev (Bulgarian: Росен Колев; born 4 July 1990) is a Bulgarian former professional footballer who played as a centre-back.

== Career ==
=== Early career ===
Kolev started to play football in CSKA Sofia's youth teams. In June 2007, English side Reading officially invited Rosen to join the training sessions of their U-19 team for one week.

Kolev's professional career started in 2008 but during that season he didn't make an appearance for the first team and in January 2010 was sent on loan to B PFG side Bdin Vidin. Rosen made his debut for Bdin on 27 February 2010 in a 1–2 away loss against Balkan Botevgrad.

=== Kom-Minyor ===
In June 2010 his contract with CSKA was mutually terminated and Kolev joined Kom-Minyor. He made his Kom-Minyor début on 31 July 2010 in the away game versus Chavdar Byala Slatina. Kolev got his first goal on 11 September, in a 2–2 home draw against Septemvri Simitli. On 2 October he scored his 2nd League goal of the season against Vihren Sandanski in a 1–0 win. He continued his scoring in the season by scoring Kom-Minyor's second goal in a 2–0 win against Botev Krivodol of the Bulgarian Cup on 20 November.

=== Botev Plovdiv ===
Kolev joined Botev Plovdiv on 11 July 2014. Nine days later, on 20 July, he made his debut during the 1–0 win over Lokomotiv Sofia. Kolev did not play in any official games in 2015 and on 25 May his contract with Botev was mutually terminated. Kolev left the team after playing in 11 games.

=== Peagsus ===
On 28 July 2017, Pegasus announced that they had signed Kolev.

On 8 July 2019, it was revealed that Kolev had left the club.

== Statistics ==
As of 1 July 2019

| Club | Season | League | | Cup | | Europe | | Total | |
| Club | Season | Apps | Goals | Apps | Goals | Apps | Goals | Apps | Goals |
|---|---|---|---|---|---|---|---|---|---|
| CSKA Sofia | 2008–09 | 0 | 0 | 0 | 0 | 0 | 0 | 0 | 0 |
| CSKA Sofia | 2009–10 | 0 | 0 | 0 | 0 | 0 | 0 | 0 | 0 |
| Bdin Vidin | 2009–10 | 10 | 1 | 0 | 0 | – | – | 10 | 1 |
| Kom-Minyor | 2010–11 | 16 | 2 | 2 | 1 | – | – | 18 | 3 |
| Cherno More | 2010–11 | 8 | 1 | 1 | 0 | – | – | 9 | 1 |
| Cherno More | 2011–12 | 21 | 1 | 1 | 0 | – | – | 22 | 1 |
| Cherno More | 2012–13 | 25 | 2 | 4 | 1 | – | – | 29 | 3 |
| Cherno More | 2013–14 | 10 | 0 | 2 | 0 | – | – | 12 | 0 |
| Lyubimets 2007 | 2013–14 | 3 | 0 | 0 | 0 | – | – | 3 | 0 |
| Botev Plovdiv | 2014–15 | 10 | 0 | 0 | 0 | – | – | 10 | 0 |
| Volga NN | 2015–16 | 20 | 1 | 2 | 0 | – | – | 22 | 1 |
| Yenisey | 2016–17 | 14 | 0 | 0 | 0 | – | – | 14 | 0 |
| Pegasus | 2017–18 | 13 | 0 | 2 | 0 | – | – | 15 | 0 |
| Pegasus | 2018–19 | 14 | 1 | 1 | 0 | – | – | 15 | 1 |
| Dunav Ruse | 2019–20 | 0 | 0 | 0 | 0 | – | – | 0 | 0 |
| Career totals | | 164 | 9 | 15 | 2 | 0 | 0 | 179 | 11 |
