= Nik Dashev =

Bulgarian footballer

Personal information
- Full name: Nik Krasimirov Dashev
- Date of birth: 13 October 1991 (age 35)
- Place of birth: Sofia, Bulgaria
- Height: 1.85 m (6 ft 1 in)
- Position: Goalkeeper

Youth career
- Pirin 2001

Senior career*
Years	Team	Apps	(Gls)
2010–2013	Chernomorets Burgas	25	(0)
2014	Cherno More	1	(0)
Total		26	(0)

International career
2010	Bulgaria U21	1	(0)
- * Club domestic league appearances and goals as of 18 May 2014

Nik Dashev (Bulgarian: Ник Дашев; born 13 October 1991 in Sofia) is a Bulgarian retired football player, who played as a goalkeeper for Chernomorets Burgas and Cherno More, before retiring aged 23.
