= Marco Tiago =

Brazilian footballer

Personal information
- Full name: Marco Tiago Faustino
- Date of birth: 23 March 1984 (age 42)
- Place of birth: Belo Horizonte, Brazil
- Height: 1.89 m (6 ft 2 in)
- Position: Left back

Senior career*
Years	Team	Apps	(Gls)
2004–2005	Grêmio	0	(0)
2006	Ipatinga	8	(0)
2006	Estrela do Norte	14	(0)
2006–2007	Feirense	14	(2)
2007–2008	Chaves	23	(4)
2008–2009	Estoril	6	(1)
2009–2010	Freamunde	23	(4)
2010–2011	Cherno More	22	(2)
2011	Portimonense	2	(0)
2012	Pelotas	10	(3)
2012	Juventude	0	(0)
2013	Villa Nova	6	(0)
2013	Treze	5	(0)
2014	ASA	9	(1)
2014	Icasa	2	(0)
2015	Mamoré	4	(1)
2015	CSA	5	(0)
2015	Villa Nova	4	(0)
2016	Uberlândia	10	(1)
2016	Comercial		
2017–2018	Cascavel	8	(1)
- * Club domestic league appearances and goals

Marco Tiago Faustino (born 23 March 1984), known as Tiago, is a former Brazilian professional footballer who played as a left back.

== Football career ==
Born in Belo Horizonte, Minas Gerais, Tiago began his professional career at Grêmio Foot-Ball Porto Alegrense, but never broke into the first team. Subsequently, he represented Ipatinga Futebol Clube and amateurs Estrela do Norte Futebol Clube in his homeland, moving to Portugal in 2006.

During his first spell in the country, Tiago played in three Segunda Liga seasons, successively appearing for C.D. Feirense, G.D. Chaves, G.D. Estoril Praia and S.C. Freamunde. His best individual output came in 2009–10, when he scored four goals in 23 games for the latter club, helping it to the 12th place.

Tiago joined PFC Cherno More Varna in Bulgaria on 27 May 2010, on a free transfer. He marked his First Professional Football League debut with a goal, in a 2–1 win against PFC Pirin Blagoevgrad on 31 July; on 14 November he scored his second league goal of the campaign, opening the scoring in a 3–0 home victory over PFC Minyor Pernik.

After leaving the Eastern Europe nation, and following a very brief spell in Portugal, Tiago spent the vast majority of his career in his country's lower leagues. He made his professional debut in Brazil in 2014 at the age of 30, with Associação Desportiva Recreativa e Cultural Icasa in the Série B.
