= Ilko Pirgov =

Bulgarian footballer

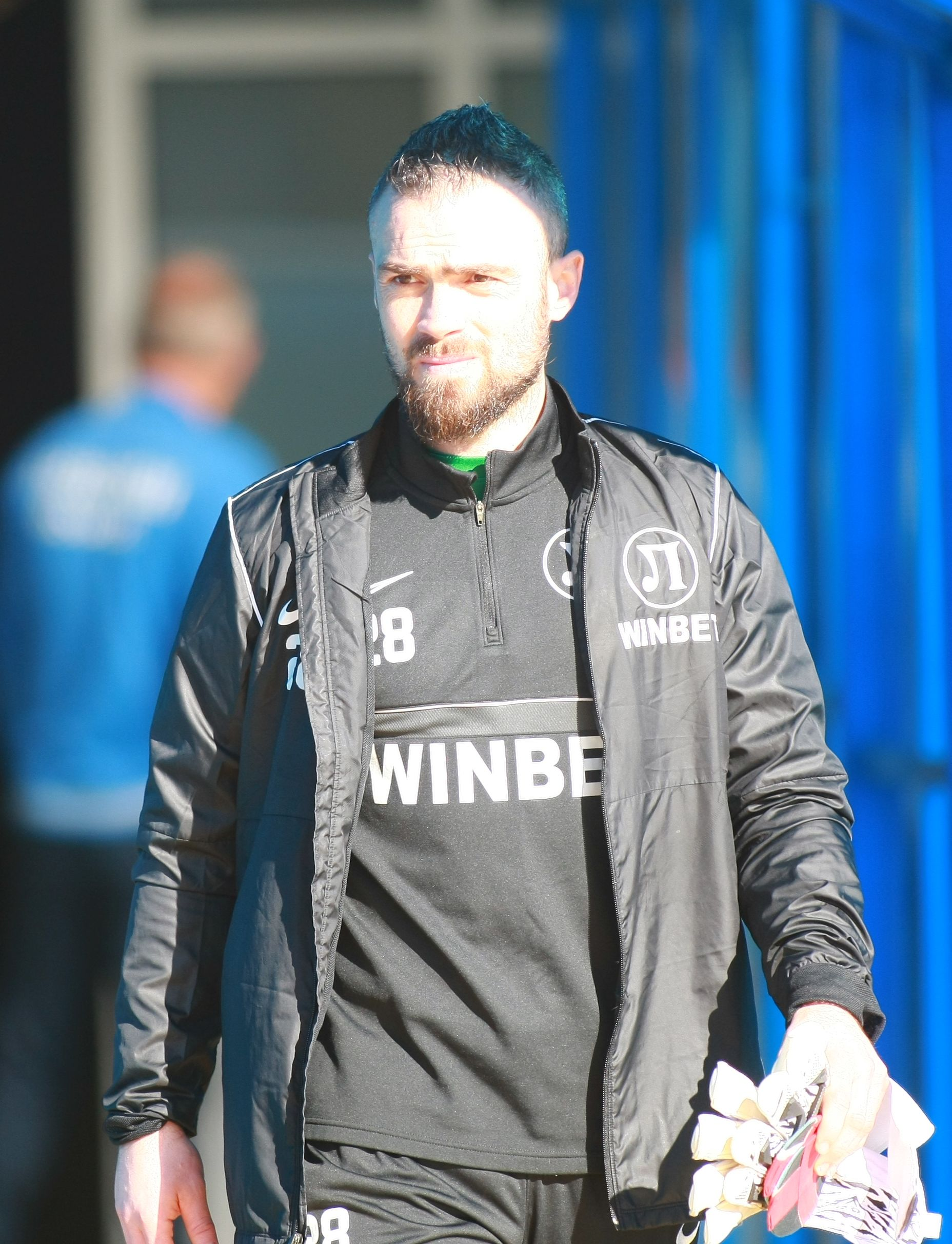

Personal information
- Full name: Ilko Emilov Pirgov
- Date of birth: 23 May 1986 (age 40)
- Place of birth: Gotse Delchev, Bulgaria
- Height: 1.83 m (6 ft 0 in)
- Position: Goalkeeper

Team information
- Current team: Lokomotiv Plovdiv (Sporting Director)

Youth career
- Pirin Gotse Delchev

Senior career*
Years	Team	Apps	(Gls)
2002–2005	Pirin Blagoevgrad	37	(0)
2005–2008	CSKA Sofia	15	(0)
2008	Otopeni	6	(0)
2009–2011	Cherno More	80	(0)
2012–2014	Litex Lovech	68	(0)
2014	Cherno More	10	(0)
2015–2016	Beroe Stara Zagora	18	(0)
2016–2023	Lokomotiv Plovdiv	99	(0)
Total		338	(0)

International career
2006	Bulgaria U21	1	(0)
- * Club domestic league appearances and goals

Ilko Emilov Pirgov (Bulgarian: Илко Емилов Пиргов; born 23 May 1986) is a Bulgarian former professional footballer who played as a goalkeeper, who is currently the sporting director of Lokomotiv Plovdiv. He is the older brother of Dimitar Pirgov.

== Career ==
Pirgov is an ex-Pirin Blagoevgrad player, where he played from 2002. He moved to CSKA Sofia in 2005. As a player of PFC CSKA Sofia he is a Bulgarian Cup winner in 2006. In 2008, he played for six months for Romanian club CS Otopeni. On 10 January 2009 he signed for Cherno More Varna.

During the 2011–12 season Pirgov became the first player in Bulgaria who earned 31 league appearances in 30 rounds. In the first half of the campaign he played in all 15 matches for Cherno More. In December 2011, Pirgov joined Litex Lovech. During a second half of the season he played in all 15 matches of his new club and in the Litex's delayed game of the autumn against Kaliakra Kavarna.

He has developed a reputation as a goalkeeper who is adept in saving penalty kicks, managing the feat on 11 occasions in the A PFG (in two other instances, the penalty takers who faced him did not hit the target) in the period from 2006 to 2020. On 1 July 2020, during the Bulgarian Cup final Pirgov came on as a substitute for Martin Lukov just prior to the commencement of the penalty shootout and was able to save Ali Sowe's kick from the spot, making a decisive contribution towards Lokomotiv Plovdiv's victory. He was subsequently one of a number of Lokomotiv Plovdiv players who developed symptoms and tested positive for COVID-19, though he recovered for the new season. On 29 July 2021, Pirgov saved three out of five penalty kicks against Czech team 1. FC Slovácko in the second leg of a Europa Conference League qualifying phase match, enabling Lokomotiv Plovdiv to prevail in the penalty shootout.

== Career statistics ==
As of 26 August 2019

Club	Season	League		Cup		Europe		Total	
Club	Season	Apps	Goals	Apps	Goals	Apps	Goals	Apps	Goals
Pirin Blagoevgrad	2002–03	9	0	0	0	—		9	0
Pirin Blagoevgrad	2003–04	18	0	2	0	—		20	0
Pirin Blagoevgrad	2004–05	10	0	0	0	—		10	0
Pirin Blagoevgrad	Total	37	0	2	0	0	0	39	0
CSKA Sofia	2005–06	9	0	2	0	0	0	11	0
CSKA Sofia	2006–07	0	0	2	0	0	0	2	0
CSKA Sofia	2007–08	2	0	0	0	0	0	2	0
CSKA Sofia	Total	11	0	4	0	0	0	15	0
Otopeni	2008–09	6	0	0	0	—		6	0
Otopeni	Total	4	0	0	0	0	0	4	0
Cherno More	2008–09	7	0	0	0	0	0	7	0
Cherno More	2009–10	28	0	3	0	4	0	35	0
Cherno More	2010–11	26	0	3	0	—		29	0
Cherno More	2011–12	15	0	1	0	—		16	0
Cherno More	Total	76	0	7	0	4	0	87	0
Litex Lovech	2011–12	16	0	0	0	—		16	0
Litex Lovech	2012–13	29	0	6	0	—		35	0
Litex Lovech	2013–14	14	0	1	0	—		15	0
Litex Lovech	2014–15	0	0	0	0	2	0	2	0
Litex Lovech	Total	59	0	7	0	2	0	68	0
Cherno More	2014–15	7	0	3	0	—		10	0
Cherno More	Total	7	0	3	0	0	0	10	0
Beroe	2014–15	8	0	0	0	—		8	0
Beroe	2015–16	5	0	5	0	0	0	10	0
Beroe	Total	13	0	5	0	0	0	18	0
Lokomotiv Plovdiv	2016–17	16	0	0	0	—		16	0
Lokomotiv Plovdiv	2017–18	24	0	0	0	—		24	0
Lokomotiv Plovdiv	2018–19	7	0	1	0	—		8	0
Lokomotiv Plovdiv	2019–20	1	0	1	0	—		1	0
Lokomotiv Plovdiv	Total	48	0	1	0	0	0	49	0
Career total		257	0	29	0	6	0	292	0

== Honours ==
=== Club ===
CSKA Sofia

- Bulgarian League: 2007–08
- Bulgarian Cup: 2005–06

Lokomotiv Plovdiv

- Bulgarian Cup (2): 2018–19, 2019–20
- Bulgarian Supercup: 2020
