= 2008–09 PFC Cherno More Varna season =

Cherno More
2008–09 season
- Chairman: Marin Marinov
- Manager: Nikola Spasov
- A Group: 3rd
- Bulgarian Cup: Second round (knocked out by Minyor)
- UEFA Cup: First round (knocked out by Stuttgart)
- Top goalscorer: Yordan Yurukov (11)
- Biggest win: 6–0 (vs Belasitsa, 1 May 2009)
- Biggest defeat: 3–0 (vs Levski, 11 Sep 2008)

This page covers all relevant details regarding PFC Cherno More Varna for all official competitions inside the 2008–09 season. These are A PFG, Bulgarian Cup and UEFA Cup.

== 2008-09 Squad ==
As of 27 April 2009

No.	Pos	Nat	Player	Total		A PFG		Bulgarian Cup		UEFA Cup	
No.	Pos	Nat	Player	Apps	Goals	Apps	Goals	Apps	Goals	Apps	Goals
1	GK	(Bulgaria) BUL	Karamfil Ilchev	26	0	20	0	1	0	5	0
2	DF	(Latvia) LVA	Stanislavs Pihockis	1	0	1	0	0	0	0	0
3	DF	(Uruguay) URU	Sebastián Flores	0	0	0	0	0	0	0	0
4	DF	(Bulgaria) BUL	Radoslav Bachev	20	1	17	0	0	0	3	1
5	DF	(Bulgaria) BUL	Nikolay Domakinov	19	0	14	0	0	0	5	0
6	DF	(Bulgaria) BUL	Tanko Dyakov	32	1	25	0	1	0	6	1
7	MF	(Bulgaria) BUL	Stanislav Stoyanov	33	0	26	0	1	0	6	0
8	MF	(Bulgaria) BUL	Atanas Bornosuzov	12	2	12	2	0	0	0	0
10	MF	(Bulgaria) BUL	Alex	32	10	27	5	1	1	4	4
11	MF	(Bulgaria) BUL	Georgi Kakalov	13	4	13	4	0	0	0	0
12	GK	(Bulgaria) BUL	Ivaylo Marinov	1	0	1	0	0	0	0	0
13	FW	(Bulgaria) BUL	Todor Kolev	8	2	8	2	0	0	0	0
15	DF	(Bulgaria) BUL	Aleksandar Aleksandrov	26	2	20	2	1	0	5	0
16	FW	(Bulgaria) BUL	Teodor Atanasov	5	0	4	0	0	0	1	0
20	MF	(Bulgaria) BUL	Mihail Lazarov	24	1	22	1	1	0	1	0
21	MF	(Bulgaria) BUL	Georgi Iliev	26	4	20	3	1	0	5	1
22	MF	(Bulgaria) BUL	Milen Petkov	26	0	19	0	1	0	6	0
23	MF	(Bulgaria) BUL	Daniel Georgiev	27	3	21	3	1	0	5	0
26	GK	(Bulgaria) BUL	Ilko Pirgov	7	0	7	0	0	0	0	0
27	MF	(Bulgaria) BUL	Daniel Dimov	11	0	11	0	0	0	0	0
31	FW	(Bulgaria) BUL	Miroslav Manolov	28	11	22	9	1	0	5	2
33	GK	(Bulgaria) BUL	Krasimir Kolev	2	0	1	0	0	0	1	0
77	MF	(Bulgaria) BUL	Yordan Yurukov	36	14	29	11	1	0	6	3
84	MF	(Mali) MLI	Mamoutou Coulibaly	11	0	11	0	0	0	0	0
--	GK	(Moldova) MDA	Evgheni Hmaruc	4	0	3	0	0	0	1	0
--	MF	(Bulgaria) BUL	Petar Kostadinov	5	0	5	0	0	0	0	0
--	FW	(Argentina) ARG	Adrián Fernández	17	4	12	4	1	0	4	0
--	FW	(Bulgaria) BUL	Georgi Andonov	7	1	5	0	0	0	2	1
--	DF	(Brazil) BRA	Peris	20	0	14	0	1	0	5	0
--	MF	(Portugal) POR	Ricardo André	20	1	13	0	1	0	6	1

=== Summer'2008 ===
In

- (Bulgaria) Georgi Iliev - Signed from CSKA Sofia
- (Bulgaria) Yordan Yurukov - Signed from CSKA Sofia
- (Bulgaria) Tanko Dyakov - Signed from Vihren
- (Bulgaria) Milen Petkov - Signed from Ilisiakos F.C.
- (Moldova) Evgheni Hmaruc - Signed from Persija Jakarta
- (Argentina) Adrián Fernández - Signed from FC St. Gallen

Out

- (Bulgaria) Aleksandar Tomash - Signed with FK Baku
- (Bulgaria) Kiril Djorov - Signed with Vihren
- (Armenia) Tigran Gharabaghtsyan - Signed with Pyunik Yerevan
- (Bulgaria) Konstantin Mirchev - Signed with Omonia Aradippou
- (Democratic Republic of the Congo) Masena Moke - Signed with Vihren

=== Winter'2009 ===
In

- (Mali) Mamoutou Coulibaly - Signed from FC Brussels
- (Uruguay) Sebastián Flores - Signed from CD Cobenas
- (Bulgaria) Georgi Kakalov - Signed from Dinamo Minsk
- (Bulgaria) Atanas Bornosuzov - Signed from Al Salmiya
- (Bulgaria) Ilko Pirgov - Signed from CS Otopeni
- (Latvia) Stanislavs Pihockis - Signed from FK Riga

Out

- (Moldova) Evgheni Hmaruc
- (Bulgaria) Petar Kostadinov - Signed with Beroe
- (Bulgaria) Vladimir Kostadinov - Loan to Chernomorets Balchik
- (Bulgaria) Georgi Andonov - Loan to Botev Plovdiv
- (Argentina) Adrián Fernández - Signed with Chernomorets Burgas
- (Brazil) Peris - to Reserve squad
- (Portugal) Ricardo André - to Reserve squad

=== Management ===
- Manager: Nikola Spasov
- Assistant Managers: Velizar Popov
- Goalkeeping Coach: Krasimir Kolev
- Fitness Coach: Veselin Markov
- Medic: Metin Mutlu

=== Administration ===
- President: Marin Mitev
- Vicepresident: Nikolay Nikolaev
- General Manager: Marin Marinov
- Marketing Director: Mihail Statev
- Press Officer: Krasimir Nikolov

== Matches ==
=== A PFG ===
Kick-off listed in local time (EET)

9 August 2008 Round 1	Pirin	1–2	Cherno More	Blagoevgrad
18:00	Peev 74'	(Report)	Manolov 70'; Yurukov 90+4'	Stadium: Hristo Botev; Attendance: 4,000; Referee: Asen Nikolov

17 August 2008 Round 2	Cherno More	2–0	Vihren	Varna
18:00	Alex 23'; Manolov 48'	(Report)		Stadium: Ticha; Attendance: 4,500; Referee: Georgi Yordanov

24 August 2008 Round 3	Botev	2–2	Cherno More	Plovdiv
18:00	Saidhodzha 23', 74'	(Report)	Manolov 33'; Fernández 54'	Stadium: Hristo Botev; Attendance: 6,000; Referee: Atanas Dimitrov

1 September 2008 Round 4	Cherno More	0–1	Chernomorets	Varna
17:00		(Report)	Petrov 84' (pen.)	Stadium: Ticha; Attendance: 7,500; Referee: Stanislav Todorov

11 September 2008 Round 5	Levski	3–0	Cherno More	Sofia
19:30	Hristov 15' (pen.); Joãzinho 34' (pen.); Tiberkanine 87'		Dyakov (red card) 34'	Stadium: Georgi Asparuhov; Attendance: 7,000; Referee: Cvetan Georgiev

21 September 2008 Round 6	Lokomotiv Plovdiv	1–0	Cherno More	Plovdiv
17:30	D.Iliev 7'	(Report)		Stadium: Lokomotiv Stadium; Attendance: 3,500; Referee: Ivaylo Stoyanov

30 September 2008 Round 7	Cherno More	1–0	Lokomotiv Sofia	Varna
19:30	Iliev 44'	(Report)		Stadium: Ticha; Attendance: 1,800; Referee: Georgi Ignatov

7 October 2008 Round 8	Litex	1–0	Cherno More	Lovech
16:30	Popov 52'	(Report)		Stadium: Lovech Stadium; Attendance: 1,000; Referee: Anton Genov

19 October 2008 Round 9	Cherno More	2–0	Lokomotiv Mezdra	Varna
16:00	Yurukov 42'; Yurukov 63'			Stadium: Ticha Stadium; Attendance: 4,000; Referee: Cvetan Georgiev

26 October 2008 Round 10	Belasitsa	2–0	Cherno More	Sandanski
16:00	Beto 24', 36'			Stadium: Sandanski Stadium; Attendance: 800; Referee: Cvetan Georgiev

1 November 2008 Round 11	Cherno More	3–0	OFC Sliven 2000	Varna
14:00	Yurukov 5'; Aleksandrov 17'; Fernández 87' (pen.)			Stadium: Ticha Stadium; Attendance: 3,500; Referee: Hristo Ristoskov

8 November 2008 Round 12	CSKA Sofia	1–1	Cherno More	Sofia
14:00	Yanchev 66'	(Report)	Manolov 72'	Stadium: Balgarska Armiya; Attendance: 2,500; Referee: Hristo Ristoskov

14 November 2008 Round 13	Cherno More	5–0	Spartak Varna	Varna
14:00	Manolov 51'; Fernández 60', 75'; Iliev 73'; Kolev 80'			Stadium: Ticha Stadium; Attendance: 8,500; Referee: Stefan Spasov

24 November 2008 Round 14	Slavia	0–2	Cherno More	Sofia
14:00			Lazarov 13'; Manolov 21'	Stadium: Slavia Stadium; Attendance: 500; Referee: Stanislav Todorov

29 November 2008 Round 15	Cherno More	4–0	Minyor	Varna
14:30	Alex 13' (pen.), 33'; Yurukov 38'; Manolov 65'			Stadium: Ticha; Attendance: 2,200; Referee: Ahmed Ahmed

8 March 2009 Round 16	Cherno More	1–0	Pirin	Varna
15:30	Alex 26' (pen.)			Stadium: Ticha; Attendance: 6,000; Referee: Georgi Yordanov

15 March 2009 Round 17	Vihren	0–2	Cherno More	Sofia
13:00			Yurukov 17'; Manolov 58'	Stadium: Georgi Asparuhov; Attendance: 600; Referee: Georgi Ignatov

18 March 2009 Round 18	Cherno More	1–0	Botev	Varna
13:00	Iliev 88'; Ilchev (red card) 10'		Popov (red card) 89'; Manchev (red card) 90'	Stadium: Ticha; Attendance: 3,000; Referee: Anton Genov

25 March 2009 Round 19	Chernomorets	0–0	Cherno More	Burgas
19:00				Stadium: Naftex; Attendance: 5,200; Referee: Georgi Ignatov

4 April 2009 Round 20	Cherno More	0–0	Levski	Varna
15:30				Stadium: Ticha; Attendance: 11,500; Referee: Hristo Ristoskov

13 April 2009 Round 21	Cherno More	2–1	Loko Plovdiv	Varna
16:00	Bornosuzov 41'; Alex 79'		Sechkov 86'	Stadium: Ticha; Attendance: 4,500; Referee: Georgi Yordanov

18 April 2009 Round 22	Loko Sofia	3–2	Cherno More	Sofia
16:00	Savić 36'; Špišić 58'; Baldovaliev 72'		Alex 43' (pen.); Yurukov 85'	Stadium: Lokomotiv; Attendance: 3,000; Referee: Georgi Yordanov

22 April 2009 Round 23	Cherno More	0–0	Litex	Varna
17:00				Stadium: Ticha; Attendance: 4,000; Referee: Georgi Ignatov

27 April 2009 Round 24	Loko Mezdra	1–3	Cherno More	Mezdra
17:00	Simonović 61'		Manolov 43'; Yurukov 58', 65'	Stadium: Lokomotiv; Attendance: 500; Referee: Ivaylo Stoyanov

1 May 2009 Round 25	Cherno More	6–0	Belasitsa	Varna
16:00	Georgiev 4', 5', 34'; Yurukov 63'; Kakalov 73', 90'			Stadium: Ticha; Attendance: 1,500; Referee: Stanislav Stavrov

10 May 2009 Round 26	Sliven	0–1	Cherno More	Sliven
16:30			Kakalov 90+3'	Stadium: Hadzhi Dimitar; Attendance: 4,000; Referee: Angel Angelov

16 May 2009 Round 27	Cherno More	1–0	CSKA	Varna
16:30	Yurukov 7'			Stadium: Ticha; Attendance: 12,000; Referee: Hristo Ristoskov

23 May 2009 Round 28	Spartak	0–1	Cherno More	Varna
18:00			Kakalov 62'	Stadium: Spartak; Attendance: 5,500; Referee: Ivaylo Stoyanov

31 May 2009 Round 29	Cherno More	2–0	Slavia	Varna
17:00	Kavdanski 44' (o.g.); Bornosuzov 52'			Stadium: Ticha; Attendance: 4,500; Referee: Nikolay Yordanov

14 June 2009 Round 30	Minyor	2–2	Cherno More	Pernik
17:00	Dyulgerov 40'; Valmir 52'		A.Georgiev 5'; Kolev 90' (pen.)	Stadium: Minyor; Attendance: 3,500; Referee: Vihren Manev

==== League table ====
Pos	Team	Pld	W	D	L	GF	GA	GD	Pts	Qualification or relegation
1	Levski Sofia (C)	30	21	6	3	57	18	+39	69	Qualification for Champions League second qualifying round
2	CSKA Sofia	30	21	5	4	54	22	+32	68	Qualification for Europa League third qualifying round
3	Cherno More	30	18	6	6	48	19	+29	60	Qualification for Europa League second qualifying round
4	Litex Lovech	30	17	7	6	53	26	+27	58	Qualification for Europa League play-off round (Note: Litex Lovech won the 2008–09 Bulgarian Cup and qualified for the play-off round of the UEFA Europa League.)
5	Lokomotiv Sofia	30	16	6	8	52	29	+23	54	

Source: A PFG (in Bulgarian)
Rules for classification: 1st points; 2nd head-to-head points; 3rd head-to-head goal difference; 4th head-to-head goals scored; 5th head-to-head away goals scored; 6th goal difference; 7th goals scored
(C) Champions

==== Results summary ====
Overall								Home						Away					
Pld	W	D	L	GF	GA	GD	Pts	W	D	L	GF	GA	GD	W	D	L	GF	GA	GD
30	18	6	6	48	19	+29	60	12	2	1	30	2	+28	6	4	5	18	17	+1

Last updated: 13 June 2009.

==== League performance ====
Round	1	2	3	4	5	6	7	8	9	10	11	12	13	14	15	16	17	18	19	20	21	22	23	24	25	26	27	28	29	30
Ground	A	H	A	H	A	A	H	A	H	A	H	A	H	A	H	H	A	H	A	H	H	A	H	A	H	A	H	A	H	A
Result	W	W	D	L	L	L	W	L	W	L	W	D	W	W	W	W	W	W	D	D	W	L	D	W	W	W	W	W	W	D
Position	3	2	2	6	8	9	8	9	7	9	7	7	6	5	4	3	3	3	3	5	4	4	4	3	3	3	3	3	3	3

A = Away; H = Home; W = Win; D = Draw; L = Loss

=== Bulgarian Cup ===
Kick-off listed in local time (EET)

4 December 2008 2nd round	Minyor	2–1	Cherno More	Pernik
14:00	Dichev 50'; Gospodinov 102' (pen.)	(Report)	Alex 10'	Stadium: Minyor Stadium; Attendance: 2,200; Referee: Hristo Ristoskov

=== UEFA Cup ===
Kick-off listed in local time

17 July 2008 1st qualifying round/1st leg	Cherno More (Bulgaria)	4 – 0	(Andorra) UE Sant Julià	Sofia, Bulgaria
20:30	Alex 84', 90+1'; Manolov 87'; Bachev 90+3'		Fontán (red card) 40'	Stadium: Vasil Levski; Attendance: 1,700; Referee: Radek Příhoda (Czech Republic)

31 July 2008 1st qualifying round/2nd leg	UE Sant Julià (Andorra)	0 – 5 (0–9 agg.)	(Bulgaria) Cherno More	Aixovall, Andorra
21:30			Yurukov 22', 39'; Manolov 41'; Tremonti 50' (o.g.); Andonov 64' (red card) 67'	Stadium: Estadio Comunal; Attendance: 220; Referee: Albanu Janku (Albania)

14 August 2008 2nd qualifying round/1st leg	Maccabi Netanya (Israel)	1 – 1	(Bulgaria) Cherno More	Tel Aviv, Israel
21:00	Kioyo 27'		Alex 42'	Stadium: Bloomfield Stadium; Attendance: 4,500; Referee: Bernhard Bruger (Austria)

28 August 2008 2nd qualifying round/2nd leg	Cherno More (Bulgaria)	2 – 0 (3–1 agg.)	(Israel) Maccabi Netanya	Sofia, Bulgaria
20:00	Alex 8'; Ricardo 78'			Stadium: Vasil Levski; Attendance: 2,500; Referee: Andrej Hitaylo (Estonia)

18 September 2008 1st round/1st leg	Cherno More (Bulgaria)	1 – 2	(Germany) VfB Stuttgart	Sofia, Bulgaria
18:00	Dyakov 42'		Gómez 67', 81'	Stadium: Vasil Levski; Attendance: 4,500; Referee: Rodriguez Santyago (Spain)

2 October 2008 1st round/2nd leg	VfB Stuttgart (Germany)	2 – 2 (4–3 agg.)	(Bulgaria) Cherno More	Stuttgart, Germany
19:20	Hitzlsperger 82'; Gómez 90+4'		Yurukov 47'; Iliev 80'	Stadium: Mercedes-Benz Arena; Attendance: 11,500; Referee: Rodriguez Santyago (Spain)

== See also ==
- PFC Cherno More Varna
- 2007–08 PFC Cherno More Varna season
