= 2009–10 PFC Cherno More Varna season =

Cherno More
2009–10 season
- Chairman: Marin Marinov
- Manager: Velizar Popov
- A Group: 7th
- Bulgarian Cup: Quarter-finals (knocked out by Kaliakra)
- Europa League: 3rd qualifying round (knocked out by PSV)
- Top goalscorer: Ademar Júnior; Miroslav Manolov (6)
- Biggest win: 4–0 (vs Sliven, 15 Aug 2009)
- Biggest defeat: 4–0 (vs Litex, 11 Apr 2010)

This page covers all relevant details regarding PFC Cherno More Varna for all official competitions inside the 2009–10 season. These are A PFG, Bulgarian Cup and Europa League.

== Events ==
- 15 June: Forward Zdravko Lazarov agrees to join Cherno More from CSKA Sofia
- 16 June: Midfielder Stanislav Stoyanov agrees to extend for one year his contract with Cherno More
- 10 July: Defender Ademar Junior agrees to join Cherno More from ABC
- 28 July: Defender Elidiano Marques agrees to join Cherno More from CSKA Sofia
- 14 August: Midfielder Martin Kerchev agrees to join Cherno More from Slavia Sofia

== 2009–10 Squad ==
As of 2 May 2010

No.	Pos	Nat	Player	Total		A PFG		Bulgarian Cup		Europa League	
No.	Pos	Nat	Player	Apps	Goals	Apps	Goals	Apps	Goals	Apps	Goals
1	GK	(Bulgaria) BUL	Karamfil Ilchev	1	0	1	0	0	0	0	0
3	MF	(Brazil) BRA	Ademar Junior	16	5	13	5	2	0	1	0
4	DF	(Bulgaria) BUL	Radoslav Bachev	28	0	22	0	3	0	3	0
5	DF	(Bulgaria) BUL	Nikolay Domakinov	14	1	11	1	3	0	0	0
6	DF	(Bulgaria) BUL	Tanko Dyakov	28	2	24	1	3	1	1	0
7	MF	(Bulgaria) BUL	Stanislav Stoyanov	17	0	15	0	0	0	2	0
8	MF	(Bulgaria) BUL	Atanas Bornosuzov	30	2	25	1	2	1	3	0
9	FW	(Bulgaria) BUL	Gerasim Zakov	13	2	11	2	2	0	0	0
10	MF	(Bulgaria) BUL	Daniel Dimov	22	2	17	2	3	0	2	0
11	FW	(Bulgaria) BUL	Todor Kolev	20	1	18	1	2	0	0	0
12	GK	(Bulgaria) BUL	Ivaylo Marinov	0	0	0	0	0	0	0	0
13	FW	(Bulgaria) BUL	Ilian Kapitanov	1	0	1	0	0	0	0	0
14	FW	(Bulgaria) BUL	Georgi Bozhilov	11	3	10	3	1	0	0	0
15	DF	(Bulgaria) BUL	Aleksandar D. Aleksandrov	30	0	23	0	3	0	4	0
18	MF	(Bulgaria) BUL	Georgi Avramov	3	0	3	0	0	0	0	0
20	MF	(Bulgaria) BUL	Mihail Lazarov	19	0	13	0	2	0	4	0
21	MF	(Bulgaria) BUL	Georgi Iliev	22	6	16	4	2	2	4	0
22	MF	(Bulgaria) BUL	Milen Petkov	15	0	11	0	0	0	4	0
23	MF	(Bulgaria) BUL	Daniel Georgiev	23	6	17	4	2	1	4	1
25	DF	(Bulgaria) BUL	Aleksandar E. Aleksandrov	11	0	10	0	1	0	0	0
26	GK	(Bulgaria) BUL	Ilko Pirgov	35	0	28	0	3	0	4	0
27	MF	(Estonia) EST	Daniil Ratnikov	7	1	7	1	0	0	0	0
28	MF	(Brazil) BRA	Elidiano Marques	25	1	22	0	3	1	0	0
31	FW	(Bulgaria) BUL	Miroslav Manolov	20	9	15	6	1	0	4	3
33	GK	(Bulgaria) BUL	Krasimir Kolev	0	0	0	0	0	0	0	0
34	DF	(Bulgaria) BUL	Kamen Trifonov	1	0	1	0	0	0	0	0
77	MF	(Bulgaria) BUL	Yordan Yurukov	15	2	10	2	1	0	4	0
84	DF	(Mali) MLI	Mamoutou Coulibaly	24	0	18	0	2	0	4	0
90	FW	(Bulgaria) BUL	Rumen Nikolov	9	1	9	1	0	0	0	0
Players sold or loaned out after the start of the season:
	MF	(Bulgaria) BUL	Georgi Kakalov	9	2	7	2	0	0	2	0
	MF	(Bulgaria) BUL	Alex	8	0	5	0	0	0	3	0
	FW	(Bulgaria) BUL	Zdravko Lazarov	13	0	10	0	0	0	3	0
	MF	(Bulgaria) BUL	Martin Kerchev	8	0	7	0	1	0	0	0

=== Players in / out ===
In:

Date	Name	Nat	Pos	Moving from	Fee
Summer transfer window:
15 June 2009	Zdravko Lazarov	(Bulgaria)	FW	CSKA Sofia	Free
10 July 2009	Ademar Junior	(Brazil)	DF	ABC	Undisclosed
28 July 2009	Elidiano Marques	(Brazil)	DF	CSKA Sofia	Undisclosed
14 Aug 2009	Martin Kerchev	(Bulgaria)	MF	Slavia Sofia	Free
27 Aug 2009	Gerasim Zakov	(Bulgaria)	FW	Lokomotiv Plovdiv	Free
Winter transfer window:
12 Jan 2010	Aleksandar E. Aleksandrov	(Bulgaria)	FW	Beroe Stara Zagora	30,000 euros
1 Feb 2010	Georgi Bozhilov	(Bulgaria)	FW	Chernomorets Burgas	50,000 euros
10 Feb 2010	Georgi Avramov	(Bulgaria)	MF	Spartak Plovdiv	Free
10 Feb 2010	Daniil Ratnikov	(Estonia)	MF	Trans Narva	50,000 euros
25 Mar 2010	Ilian Kapitanov	(Bulgaria)	FW	Reserves	
25 Mar 2010	Rumen Nikolov	(Bulgaria)	FW	Reserves	

Out:

Date	Name	Nat	Pos	Moving to	Fee
Summer transfer window:
15 June 2009	Stanislavs Pihockis	(Latvia)	DF	Metta-Latvijas Universitāte	Free
15 June 2009	Sebastián Flores	(Uruguay)	DF	Botev Plovdiv	Free
10 July 2009	Teodor Atanasov	(Bulgaria)	FW	released	
Winter transfer window:
5 Dec 2009	Georgi Kakalov	(Bulgaria)	FW	end of loan	
12 Jan 2010	Alex	(Bulgaria)	MF	Levski Sofia	30,000 euros
12 Jan 2010	Zdravko Lazarov	(Bulgaria)	FW	Lokomotiv Plovdiv	Free
12 Jan 2010	Martin Kerchev	(Bulgaria)	MF	Lokomotiv Mezdra	Free

=== Kit ===
Supplier: Tomy
Sponsor(s): none

Home	Away

Last updated: 16 July.

=== Goalscorers ===
Rank	Name	League	Cup	Europe	Total
1	Miroslav Manolov	6	0	3	9
2	Daniel Georgiev	4	1	1	6
=	Georgi Iliev	4	2	0	6
4	Ademar Júnior	5	0	0	5
5	Georgi Bozhilov	3	0	0	3
6	Georgi Kakalov	2	0	0	2
=	Atanas Bornosuzov	1	1	0	2
=	Tanko Dyakov	1	1	0	2
=	Daniel Dimov	2	0	0	2
=	Yordan Yurukov	2	0	0	2
=	Gerasim Zakov	2	0	0	2
12	Nikolay Domakinov	1	0	0	1
=	Elidiano Marques	0	1	0	1
=	Todor Kolev	1	0	0	1
=	Rumen Nikolov	1	0	0	1
=	Daniil Ratnikov	1	0	0	1

=== Long-term injury list ===
Date	Player	Injury	Estimated Return Date
9 August 2009	(Bulgaria) Yordan Yurukov		28 March 2010
7 December 2009	(Bulgaria) Milen Petkov		June 2010
15 January 2010	(Bulgaria) Miroslav Manolov		June 2010
19 March 2010	(Bulgaria) Georgi Iliev		June 2010

Last updated: 2010-05-16
Source: chernomorepfc.bg

== Competitions ==
=== Overall ===
Competition	Started round	Current position / round	Final position / round	First match	Last Match
A PFG	–	–	7	9 August 2009	16 May 2010
Europa League	QR2	–	QR3	16 July 2009	6 August 2009
Bulgarian Cup	1/16	–	1/4	25 November 2009	4 April 2010

=== A PFG ===
==== League table ====
Pos	Team	Pld	W	D	L	GF	GA	GD	Pts
5	Chernomorets Burgas	30	15	6	9	44	29	+15	51
6	Slavia Sofia	30	14	8	8	34	28	+6	50
7	Cherno More	30	13	9	8	40	28	+12	48
8	Minyor Pernik	30	13	6	11	38	26	+12	45
9	Pirin Blagoevgrad	30	11	10	9	34	32	+2	43

Source: A PFG (in Bulgarian)
Rules for classification: 1st points; 2nd head-to-head points; 3rd head-to-head goal difference; 4th head-to-head goals scored; 5th head-to-head away goals scored; 6th goal difference; 7th goals scored

==== Results summary ====
Overall								Home						Away					
Pld	W	D	L	GF	GA	GD	Pts	W	D	L	GF	GA	GD	W	D	L	GF	GA	GD
30	13	9	8	40	28	+12	48	9	6	0	27	8	+19	4	3	8	13	20	−7

Last updated: 16 May 2010.

==== League performance ====
Round	1	2	3	4	5	6	7	8	9	10	11	12	13	14	15	16	17	18	19	20	21	22	23	24	25	26	27	28	29	30
Ground	A	H	A	H	A	H	A	H	A	H	A	H	A	H	A	H	A	H	A	H	A	H	A	H	A	H	A	H	A	H
Result	L	W	L	W	D	W	L	D	W	D	L	W	L	D	W	W	D	W	W	D	L	W	L	W	L	D	W	D	D	W
Position	11	7	12	8	9	7	7	8	6	6	8	7	8	10	9	8	9	5	5	6	8	6	7	6	7	7	7	7	7	7

Source: Competitive Matches
A = Away; H = Home; W = Win; D = Draw; L = Loss

== Matches ==
=== Competitive ===
N	Date	Tournament	Round	Ground	Opponent	Score	Attendance	Cherno More Scorers
1	16 Jul 2009	Europa League	QR2	H	(Moldova) Iskra-Stal	1–0	5,500	Manolov
2	23 Jul 2009	Europa League	QR2	A	(Moldova) Iskra-Stal	3–0	2,000	Manolov (2), Georgiev
3	30 Jul 2009	Europa League	QR3	A	(Netherlands) PSV Eindhoven	0–1	14,000	
4	06 Aug 2009	Europa League	QR3	H	(Netherlands) PSV Eindhoven	0–1	15,700	
5	09 Aug 2009	A PFG	1	A	Chernomorets	1–2	3,500	Yurukov
6	15 Aug 2009	A PFG	2	H	Sliven	4–0	4,000	Manolov (2), Georgiev, Bornosuzov
7	22 Aug 2009	A PFG	3	A	Loko Plovdiv	0–1	4,000	
8	29 Aug 2009	A PFG	4	H	Botev	3–0	2,500	Kakalov (2), Manolov
9	12 Sep 2009	A PFG	5	A	Beroe	0–0	3,500	
10	19 Sep 2009	A PFG	6	H	Minyor	1–0	2,000	Iliev
11	26 Sep 2009	A PFG	7	A	Sportist	1–2	2,300	Manolov
12	03 Oct 2009	A PFG	8	H	Litex	0–0	3,000	
13	17 Oct 2009	A PFG	9	A	Loko Mezdra	2–1	1,300	Manolov, Iliev
14	24 Oct 2009	A PFG	10	H	Slavia	1–1	2,200	Iliev
15	31 Oct 2009	A PFG	11	A	Pirin	0–1	1,000	
16	07 Nov 2009	A PFG	12	H	Loko Sofia	4–2	3,500	Georgiev (2), Manolov, Domakinov
17	21 Nov 2009	A PFG	13	A	Levski	0–3	3,000	
18	25 Nov 2009	Cup	1/16	A	Chernomorets	2–0	4,800	Bornosuzov, Marques
19	28 Nov 2009	A PFG	14	H	CSKA	0–0	9,000	
20	05 Dec 2009	A PFG	15	A	Montana	2–1	3,500	Georgiev, Zakov
21	13 Dec 2009	Cup	1/8	H	Levski	4–1	2,200	Iliev (2), Georgiev, Dyakov
22	01 Mar 2010	A PFG	16	H	Chernomorets	2–0	4,500	Ademar, Dimov
23	08 Mar 2010	A PFG	17	A	Sliven	0–0	1,500	
24	14 Mar 2010	A PFG	17	H	Loko Plovdiv	3–2	4,500	Iliev, Bozhilov, Ademar
25		A PFG	19	A	Botev	3–0		Match awarded due to excluding of Botev
26	24 Mar 2010	A PFG	20	H	Beroe	0–0	4,000	
27	28 Mar 2010	A PFG	21	A	Minyor	0–1	1,000	
28	31 Mar 2010	Cup	1/4	A	Kaliakra	2–3	3,500	
29	04 Apr 2010	A PFG	22	H	Sportist	3–0	800	Kolev, Dyakov, Dimov
30	11 Apr 2010	A PFG	23	A	Litex	0–4	1,000	
31	14 Apr 2010	A PFG	24	H	Loko Mezdra	2–0	500	Nikolov, Pažin (o.g.)
32	17 Apr 2010	A PFG	25	A	Slavia	0–1	300	
33	21 Apr 2010	A PFG	26	H	Pirin	1–1	550	Bozhilov
34	25 Apr 2010	A PFG	27	A	Loko Sofia	2–1	1,150	Ademar (2)
35	2 May 2010	A PFG	28	H	Levski	1–1	7,000	Bozhilov
36	9 May 2010	A PFG	29	A	CSKA	2–2	7,000	Yurukov, Ademar
37	16 May 2010	A PFG	30	H	Montana	2–1	1,500	Zakov, Ratnikov

Last updated May 16, 2010

=== Friendlies ===
M	Date	Tournament	Round	Ground	Opponent	Score	Cherno More Scorers
1	07 Jul 2009	Friendly	N/A	A	Levski	1 – 1	Yurukov
2	05 Sep 2009	Friendly	N/A	Albena	Chernomorets Balchik	1 – 2	Kakalov
3	27 Jan 2010	Friendly	N/A	A	Svetkavitsa	2 – 1	Coulibaly, Ratnikov
4	03 Feb 2010	Friendly	N/A	Albena	Dunărea Galaţi	1 – 0	Bornosuzov
5	06 Feb 2010	Friendly	N/A	Pomorie	Nesebar	0 – 2	
6	10 Feb 2010	Friendly	N/A	Pomorie	Volov Shumen	2 – 0	Stoyanov, Zakov
7	13 Feb 2010	Friendly	N/A	Albena	Chernomorets Balchik	1 – 0	Ademar

== See also ==
- PFC Cherno More Varna
- 2007–08 PFC Cherno More Varna season
- 2008–09 PFC Cherno More Varna season
