= 2007–08 PFC Cherno More Varna season =

Cherno More
2007–08 season
- Chairman: Marin Marinov
- Manager: Nikola Spasov
- A Group: 5th
- Bulgarian Cup: Runners-up (knocked out by Litex)
- Top goalscorer: Alex (10)
- Biggest win: 7–0 (vs Vidima-Rakovski, 12 Dec 2007)
- Biggest defeat: 4–0 (vs Levski, 24 Sep 2007)
Home colours	Away colours

This page covers all relevant details regarding PFC Cherno More Varna for all official competitions inside the 2007-08 season. These are A PFG, Bulgarian Cup and Intertoto Cup.

== Transfers ==
=== Summer transfer window ===
In:

No.	Pos.	Nation	Player
—	GK	BUL	Ivaylo Marinov (from Chernomorets Byala)
—	DF	BUL	Mihail Lazarov (from Rodopa)
—	DF	BRA	Peris (from (Brazil) Americano)
—	DF	BUL	Nikolay Domakinov (from Botev Plovdiv)
—	MF	BRA	Djalma (from (Brazil) Central SC)
—	MF	POR	Ricardo André (from (Portugal) Gondomar)
—	MF	BUL	Alex (from (Turkey) MKE Ankaragücü)
—	FW	BRA	Fabinho (from (Brazil) Vera Cruz)

Out:

No.	Pos.	Nation	Player
—	GK	BUL	Yordan Linkov (to Naftex Burgas)
—	DF	BUL	Veselin Vachev (to Kaliakra)
—	DF	SRB	Miroslav Milošević (to (Cyprus) Alki Larnaca)
—	MF	BUL	Diyan Genchev (to (Kazakhstan) Astana-1964)
—	MF	BUL	Slavi Zhekov (to Lokomotiv Stara Zagora)
—	MF	POR	Paulo Dias (released)
—	MF	BUL	Todor Palankov (loan return to Litex)
—	MF	BUL	Martin Hristov (to Slavia Sofia)
—	FW	BUL	Georgi Vladimirov (to (Azerbaijan) Inter Baku)

=== Winter transfer window ===
In:

No.	Pos.	Nation	Player
—	MF	GER	Kristian Sprećaković (from (Germany) SV Elversberg)
—	FW	ARM	Tigran Gharabaghtsyan (from (Armenia) Pyunik)
—	FW	BUL	Teodor Atanasov (from (Germany) Würzburger Kickers)

Out:

No.	Pos.	Nation	Player

== 2007-08 Squad ==
No.	Pos	Nat	Player	Total		A Group		Bulgarian Cup		Intertoto Cup	
No.	Pos	Nat	Player	Apps	Goals	Apps	Goals	Apps	Goals	Apps	Goals
1	GK	(Bulgaria) BUL	Karamfil Ilchev	33	0	26	0	3	0	4	0
2	MF	(Bulgaria) BUL	Daniel Dimov	11	1	6	0	1	0	4	1
3	DF	(Brazil) BRA	Peris	29	1	23	0	5	1	1	0
4	DF	(Bulgaria) BUL	Kiril Djorov	25	0	16	0	5	0	4	0
5	DF	(Bulgaria) BUL	Nikolay Domakinov	29	1	22	1	3	0	4	0
6	MF	(Germany) GER	Kristian Sprećaković	2	0	2	0	0	0	0	0
7	MF	(Bulgaria) BUL	Stanislav Stoyanov	30	3	25	1	3	1	2	1
8	MF	(Portugal) POR	Ricardo André	35	3	28	3	3	0	4	0
9	FW	(Democratic Republic of the Congo) COD	Masena Moke	17	4	14	3	3	1	0	0
10	MF	(Bulgaria) BUL	Konstantin Mirchev	9	0	6	0	1	0	2	0
11	FW	(Bulgaria) BUL	Georgi Andonov	24	2	19	2	2	0	3	0
12	GK	(Bulgaria) BUL	Ivaylo Marinov	0	0	0	0	0	0	0	0
13	FW	(Bulgaria) BUL	Todor Kolev	10	2	8	2	2	0	0	0
14	FW	(Armenia) ARM	Tigran Gharabaghtsyan	10	0	8	0	2	0	0	0
15	DF	(Bulgaria) BUL	Aleksandar Aleksandrov	33	1	28	1	4	0	1	0
16	FW	(Bulgaria) BUL	Teodor Atanasov	0	0	0	0	0	0	0	0
18	MF	(Bulgaria) BUL	Petar Kostadinov	13	0	10	0	1	0	2	0
20	MF	(Bulgaria) BUL	Mihail Lazarov	14	1	10	1	4	0	0	0
21	MF	(Brazil) BRA	Djalma	12	0	9	0	1	0	2	0
22	FW	(Brazil) BRA	Fabinho	17	1	14	1	1	0	2	0
23	MF	(Bulgaria) BUL	Daniel Georgiev	29	7	20	4	5	2	4	1
24	DF	(Bulgaria) BUL	Radoslav Bachev	23	1	18	0	1	0	4	1
26	DF	(Bulgaria) BUL	Aleksandar Tomash	29	0	22	0	3	0	4	0
28	FW	(Brazil) BRA	Markos Da Silva	17	3	12	0	2	1	3	2
30	MF	(Bulgaria) BUL	Alex	32	13	27	10	5	3	0	0
31	FW	(Bulgaria) BUL	Miroslav Manolov	31	11	22	9	5	1	4	1
33	GK	(Bulgaria) BUL	Krasimir Kolev	8	0	5	0	3	0	0	0

=== Management ===
- Manager: Nikola Spasov
- Assistant Managers: Velizar Popov
- Goalkeeping Coach: Krasimir Kolev
- Fitness Coach: Veselin Markov
- Medic: Metin Mutlu

=== Administration ===
- President: Marin Mitev
- Vicepresident: Nikolay Nikolaev
- General Manager: Marin Marinov
- Marketing Director: Mihail Statev
- Press Officer: Krasimir Nikolov

== Matches ==
=== A PFG ===
Kick-off listed in local time (EET)

13 August 2007 Round 1	Pirin	1–0	Cherno More	Blagoevgrad
18:00	Dyakov 13'			Stadium: Hristo Botev; Attendance: 4,500; Referee: Nikolay Yordanov

22 August 2007 Round 2	Cherno More	1–1	Lokomotiv Sofia	Varna
18:00	Moke 67'		Baldovaliev 62'	Stadium: Ticha; Attendance: 5,800; Referee: Stanislav Todorov

28 August 2007 Round 3	Slavia	3–1	Cherno More	Sofia
18:00	Simonović 10'; Ortega 47'; Ortega 58'		Ricardo 59'	Stadium: Slavia; Attendance: 1,100; Referee: Aleksandar Kostadinov

4 September 2007 Round 4	Cherno More	1–0	Beroe	Varna
18:00	Alex 48'			Stadium: Ticha; Attendance: 2,800; Referee: Asen Nikolov

21 September 2007 Round 5	Lokomotiv Plovdiv	2–1	Cherno More	Plovdiv
17:00	Kamburov 4'; Dakson 6'		Ricardo (red card) 73'; Moke 78'	Stadium: Lokomotiv; Attendance: 3,000; Referee: Stanislav Todorov

24 September 2007 Round 6	Levski	4–0	Cherno More	Sofia
19:00	Dimitrov 10'; Telkiyski 18'; Domovchiyski 28'; Domovchiyski 88' (pen.)			Stadium: Vasil Levski; Attendance: 4,000; Referee: Ahmed Ahmed

1 October 2007 Round 7	Cherno More	0–0	Marek	Varna
16:30				Stadium: Ticha; Attendance: 3,500; Referee: Cvetan Georgiev

10 October 2007 Round 8	Botev	1–1	Cherno More	Plovdiv
16:00	Hristov 9'		Fabinho 37'	Stadium: Hristo Botev; Attendance: 6,500; Referee: Georgi Yordanov

23 October 2007 Round 9	Cherno More	2–1	Chernomorets	Varna
16:00	Aleksandrov 48'; Alex 82'		Krumov 45'	Stadium: Ticha; Attendance: 3,500; Referee: Stoyan Aleksiev

29 October 2007 Round 10	CSKA	1–0	Cherno More	Sofia
18:30	Amuneke 20'			Stadium: Balgraska armia Attendance: 1,500; Referee: Anton Genov

6 November 2007 Round 11	Cherno More	1–0	Vihren	Varna
15:00	Georgiev 2'			Stadium: Ticha; Attendance: 2,200; Referee: Ahmed Ahmed

12 November 2007 Round 12	Litex	1–1	Cherno More	Lovech
17:00	Bibishkov 38'		Ricardo 14'	Stadium: Lovech Stadium; Attendance: 1,200; Referee: Stanislav Todorov

28 November 2007 Round 13	Cherno More	1–1	Belasitsa	Varna
15:00	Stoyanov 47'		Lichkov (red card) 36'; Joel Kiki 72'	Stadium: Ticha; Attendance: 3,200; Referee: Stanislav Todorov

3 December 2007 Round 14	Spartak	0–1	Cherno More	Varna
14:30			Manolov 60'	Stadium: Spartak; Attendance: 7,000; Referee: Nikolay Yordanov

12 December 2007 Round 15	Cherno More	7–0	Vidima-Rakovski	Varna
14:30	Manolov 4'; Georgiev 18'; Alex 28'; Georgiev 44'; Alex 55' (pen.); Kolev 76' (pen.); Domakinov 89'			Stadium: Ticha; Attendance: 3,000; Referee: Ahmed Ahmed

1 March 2008 Round 16	Cherno More	1–0	Pirin	Varna
15:00	Manolov 77'			Stadium: Ticha; Attendance: 4,500; Referee: Asen Nikolov

8 March 2008 Round 17	Lokomotiv Sofia	4–3	Cherno More	Sofia
15:00	Baldovaliev 2'; Dafchev 45' (pen.); Dafchev 59'; Baldovaliev 82'		Ricardo 14'; Alex 22'; Alex 66'	Stadium: Lokomotiv; Attendance: 2,300; Referee: Ahmed Ahmed

15 March 2008 Round 18	Cherno More	1–0	Slavia	Varna
15:00	K.Kolev (red card) 62'; T.Kolev 90+3'			Stadium: Ticha, Attendance: 6,000; Referee: Anton Genov

18 March 2008 Round 19	Beroe	0–0	Cherno More	Stara Zagora
15:00				Stadium: Beroe; Attendance: 4,000; Referee: Hristo Ristoskov

23 March 2008 Round 20	Cherno More	2–1	Lokomotiv Plovdiv	Varna
15:30	Moke 74'; Manolov 82'		Dani Kiki 34'	Stadium: Ticha; Attendance: 3,600; Referee: Cvetan Georgiev

30 March 2008 Round 21	Cherno More	0–1	Levski	Varna
15:30			Ivanov 70'	Stadium: Ticha; Attendance: 10,500; Referee: Anton Genov

5 April 2008 Round 22	Marek	1–4	Cherno More	Dupnitsa
16:00	Taskovic 84'		Stoyanov 9'; Manolov 12'; Manolov 36'; Manolov 49'	Stadium: Bonchuk; Attendance: 450; Referee: Nikolay Yordanov

9 April 2008 Round 23	Cherno More	2–0	Botev	Varna
16:30	Alex 69' (pen.); Alex 90+2'			Stadium: Ticha; Attendance: 5,000; Referee: Ionel Ivan

12 April 2008 Round 24	Chernomorets	0–1	Cherno More	Burgas
19:00			Manolov 28'	Stadium: Naftex Stadium; Attendance: 2,500; Referee: Alexandru Deaconu

20 April 2008 Round 25	Cherno More	0–2	CSKA	Varna
16:30			Nei 10'; Nei 14'	Stadium: Ticha; Attendance: 12,000; Referee: Lucian Dan

25 April 2008 Round 26	Vihren	0–1	Cherno More	Sandanski
17:00	Sukardinha 26'		Lazarov 72'	Stadium: Gradski stadium Attendance: 1,800; Referee: Georgi Yordanov

30 April 2008 Round 27	Cherno More	2–1	Litex	Varna
17:30	Andonov 45'; Alex 84'		Sandrinho 30'	Stadium: Ticha; Attendance: 5,500; Referee: Aleksandar Kostadinov

4 May 2008 Round 28	Belasitsa	1–1	Cherno More	Petrich
18:00	Kabranov 48'		Georgiev 70'	Stadium: Tsar Samuil; Attendance: 700; Referee: Anton Genov

10 May 2008 Round 29	Cherno More	0–0	Spartak	Varna
18:00				Stadium: Ticha; Attendance: 8,000; Referee: Stanislav Todorov

17 May 2008 Round 30	Vidima-Rakovski	0–3	Cherno More	Sevlievo
18:00			Andonov 7'; Manolov 18'; Alex 31' (pen.)	Stadium: Gradski stadium Attendance: 1,000; Referee: Stanislav Stavrov

==== League table ====
Pos	Team	Pld	W	D	L	GF	GA	GD	Pts	Qualification or relegation
3	Lokomotiv Sofia	30	16	9	5	47	28	+19	57	Qualification for UEFA Cup second qualifying round (Note: Litex qualify via 2007–08 Bulgarian Cup)
4	Litex Lovech	30	16	8	6	51	26	+25	56	Qualification for UEFA Cup second qualifying round
5	Cherno More	30	13	9	8	39	28	+11	48	Qualification for UEFA Cup first qualifying round
6	Chernomorets Burgas	30	13	8	9	39	32	+7	47	Qualification for Intertoto Cup second round
7	Slavia Sofia	30	13	8	9	38	28	+10	47	

Source: A PFG (in Bulgarian)
Rules for classification: 1st points; 2nd head-to-head points; 3rd head-to-head goal difference; 4th head-to-head goals scored; 5th head-to-head away goals scored; 6th goal difference; 7th goals scored

==== Results summary ====
Overall								Home						Away					
Pld	W	D	L	GF	GA	GD	Pts	W	D	L	GF	GA	GD	W	D	L	GF	GA	GD
30	13	9	8	39	28	+11	48	9	4	2	21	8	+13	4	5	6	18	20	−2

Last updated: 17 May 2008.

==== League performance ====
Round	1	2	3	4	5	6	7	8	9	10	11	12	13	14	15	16	17	18	19	20	21	22	23	24	25	26	27	28	29	30
Ground	A	H	A	H	A	A	H	A	H	A	H	A	H	A	H	H	A	H	A	H	H	A	H	A	H	A	H	A	H	A
Result	L	D	L	W	L	L	D	D	W	L	W	D	D	W	W	W	L	W	D	W	L	W	W	W	L	W	W	D	D	W
Position	13	13	13	9	12	14	16	15	11	14	10	9	10	9	9	7	8	7	9	6	7	7	6	6	6	6	7	6	7	5

A = Away; H = Home; W = Win; D = Draw; L = Loss

=== Bulgarian Cup ===
Kick-off listed in local time (EET)

1 November 2007 2nd Round	Svetkavitsa	0–1	Cherno More	Targovishte
16:00			Alex 108'	Stadium: Dimitar Burkov; Attendance: 800; Referee: Georgi Yordanov

12 December 2007 3rd Round	FC Bansko	2–6	Cherno More	Bansko
14:30	Kyosov 35'; Toshev 76'		Georgiev 23'; Manolov 47'; Alex 58'; Peris 66'; Moke 74'; Alex 82'	Stadium: Saint Petar; Attendance: 1,200; Referee: Ivaylo Angelov

12 March 2008 Quarter-final	Cherno More	1–0	Pirin	Varna
16:00			Stoyanov 68'	Stadium: Ticha; Attendance: 6,000; Referee: Nikolay Yordanov

16 April 2008 Semi-final	Kaliakra	1–3	Cherno More	Kavarna
17:00	Kiskinov 51'; Petkov (red card) 62'		Dimitrov 6' (o.g.); Da Silva 67'; Georgiev 74'	Stadium: Gradski stadium Attendance: 4,500; Referee: Angel Bekyarov

14 May 2008 Final	Cherno More	0–1	Litex	Sofia
18:00			Manolev 55'	Stadium: Vasil Levski; Attendance: 4,000; Referee: Nikolay Yordanov

=== Intertoto Cup ===
Kick-off listed in local time

10 July 2007 2nd round/1st leg	Makedonija GP (North Macedonia)	0–4	(Bulgaria) Cherno More	Skopje, Macedonia
18:00			Bachev 48'; Da Silva 72'; Da Silva 73'; Stoyanov 82'	Stadium: Skopje City Stadium; Attendance: 2,200; Referee: Alfonso Peres Burul (Spain)

16 July 2007 2nd round/2nd leg	Cherno More (Bulgaria)	3–0	(North Macedonia) Makedonija GP	Burgas, Bulgaria
18:30	Georgiev 12'; Manolov 49'; Dimov 80'			Stadium: Naftex Stadium; Attendance: 2,500; Referee: Jori Van Der Velde (Belgium)

22 July 2007 3rd round/1st leg	Cherno More (Bulgaria)	0–1	(Italy) Sampdoria	Burgas, Bulgaria
19:00			Dimov 45+2' (o.g.)	Stadium: Naftex Stadium; Attendance: 14,500; Referee: Brage Sandmoen (Norway)

29 July 2007 3rd round/2nd leg	Sampdoria (Italy)	1–0	(Bulgaria) Cherno More	Genoa, Italy
20:30	Maggio 90+3'			Stadium: Stadio Luigi Ferraris; Attendance: 23,811; Referee: Björn Kuipers (Netherlands)
