= 2008 Bulgarian Cup final =

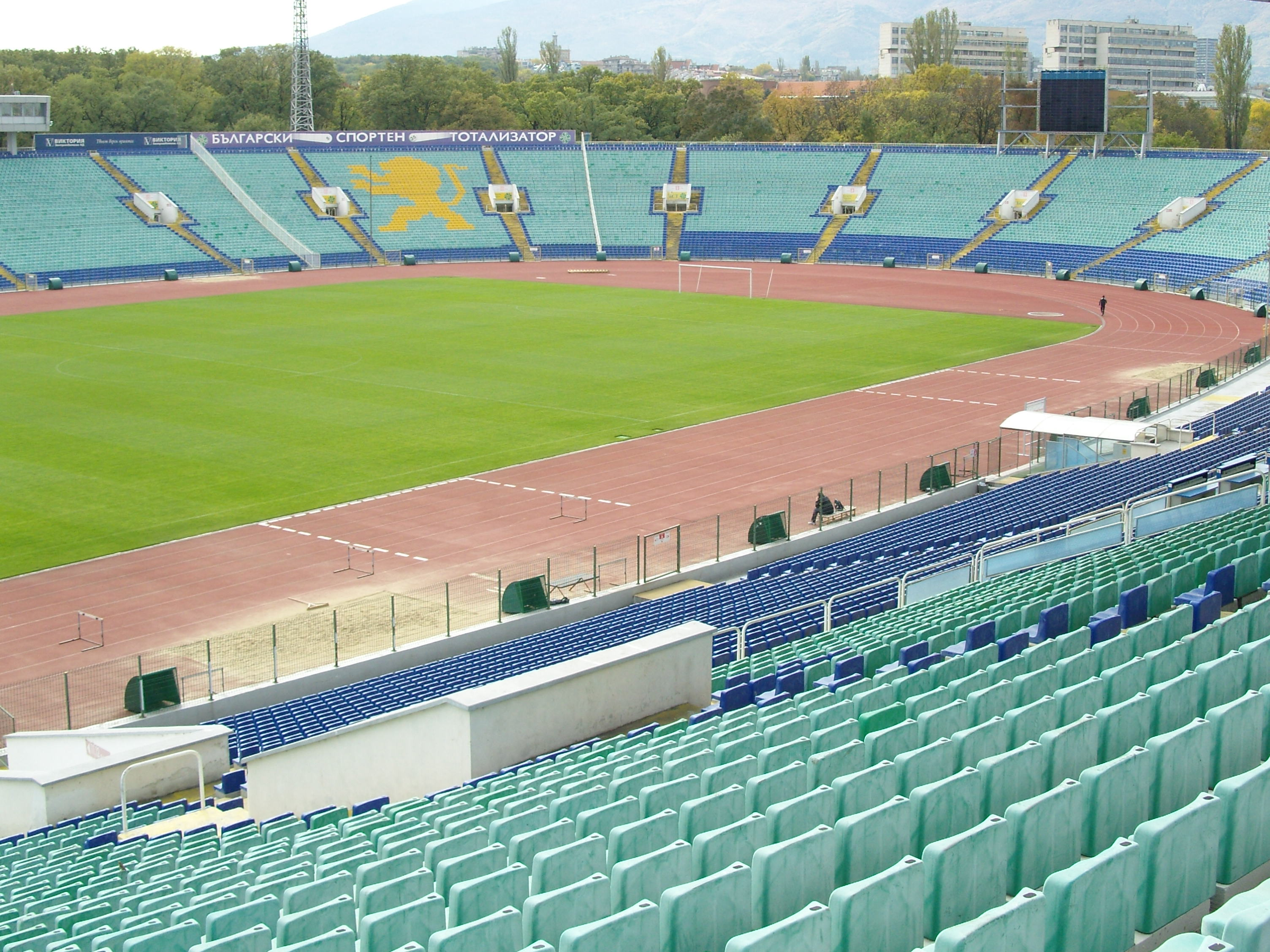
- Event: 2007–08 Bulgarian Cup
Cherno More Varna	Litex Lovech
A Group	A Group
0	1
- Date: 14 May 2008
- Venue: Vasil Levski, Sofia
- Referee: Nikolay Yordanov (Sofia)
- Attendance: 2,040

The 2008 Bulgarian Cup final was the 68th final of the Bulgarian Cup, and was contested between Cherno More Varna and Litex Lovech on 14 May 2008 at Vasil Levski National Stadium in Sofia. Litex won the final 1–0, through a Stanislav Manolev goal in the 58th minute, claiming their third Bulgarian Cup title.

== Route to the Final ==
Cherno More		Round	Litex
Opponent	Result		Opponent	Result
Svetkavitsa	1–0 away	Round of 32	Velbazhd Kyustendil	2–0 away
Bansko	6–2 away	Round of 16	Vihren Sandanski	3–0 home
Pirin Blagoevgrad	1–0 home	Quarter-finals	Levski Sofia	4–3 home (on penalties)
Kaliakra Kavarna	3–1 away	Semi-finals	Botev Plovdiv	4–2 home

== Match ==
=== Details ===
14 May 2008
18:00 EEST

Cherno More Varna	0–1	Litex Lovech
		Manolev 57'

Vasil Levski, Sofia
Attendance: 2,040
Referee: Nikolay Yordanov (Sofia)

Cherno More	Litex Lovech

Cherno More:
GK	1	(Bulgaria) Karamfil Ilchev
DF	20	(Bulgaria) Mihail Lazarov
DF	3	(Brazil) Peris
DF	15	(Bulgaria) Aleksandar Aleksandrov
DF	5	(Bulgaria) Nikolay Domakinov
DF	26	(Bulgaria) Aleksandar Tomash
MF	7	(Bulgaria) Stanislav Stoyanov (substituted off) 63'
MF	8	(Portugal) Ricardo André (yellow card) 55'
MF	23	(Bulgaria) Daniel Georgiev (substituted off) 69'
MF	30	(Bulgaria) Alex (c)
FW	31	(Bulgaria) Miroslav Manolov (yellow card) 86'
Substitutes:
GK	33	(Bulgaria) Krasimir Kolev
DF	4	(Bulgaria) Kiril Dzhorov (substituted on) 69'
MF	10	(Bulgaria) Konstantin Mirchev
FW	11	(Bulgaria) Georgi Andonov
FW	14	(Armenia) Tigran Gharabaghtsyan (substituted on) 63'
MF	18	(Bulgaria) Petar Kostadinov
DF	24	(Bulgaria) Radoslav Bachev
Manager:
(Bulgaria) Nikola Spasov Assistant referees: (Bulgaria) Nikola Dzhuganski (Bulgaria) Nikolay Angelov; Fourth official: (Bulgaria) Tsvetan Georgiev

Litex:
GK	12	(Bulgaria) Todor Todorov
RB	16	(Bulgaria) Stanislav Manolev (yellow card) 43'
CB	3	(France) Cédric Cambon
CB	22	(Bulgaria) Plamen Nikolov
LB	4	(Bulgaria) Mihail Venkov
CM	23	(Serbia) Nebojša Jelenković (c)
CM	7	(Bulgaria) Stanislav Genchev
RW	8	(Brazil) Tom (substituted off) 89'
AM	10	(Brazil) Sandrinho
LW	32	(Bulgaria) Ivelin Popov (substituted off) 90'
FW	18	(Bulgaria) Krum Bibishkov (substituted off) 70'
Substitutes:
GK	30	(Bulgaria) Evgeni Aleksandrov
FW	9	(Brazil) Eduardo Du Bala
FW	11	(Bulgaria) Emil Angelov (substituted on) 90'
DF	15	(Bulgaria) Ivan Skerlev
MF	26	(Brazil) Dudu (substituted on) 89'
MF	27	(Bulgaria) Momchil Tsvetanov
DF	33	(Bosnia and Herzegovina) Džemal Berberović (substituted on) 70'
Manager:
(Serbia) Miodrag Ješić

== See also ==
- 2007–08 A Group
