= Georgi Iliev (footballer, born 1981) =

Bulgarian footballer

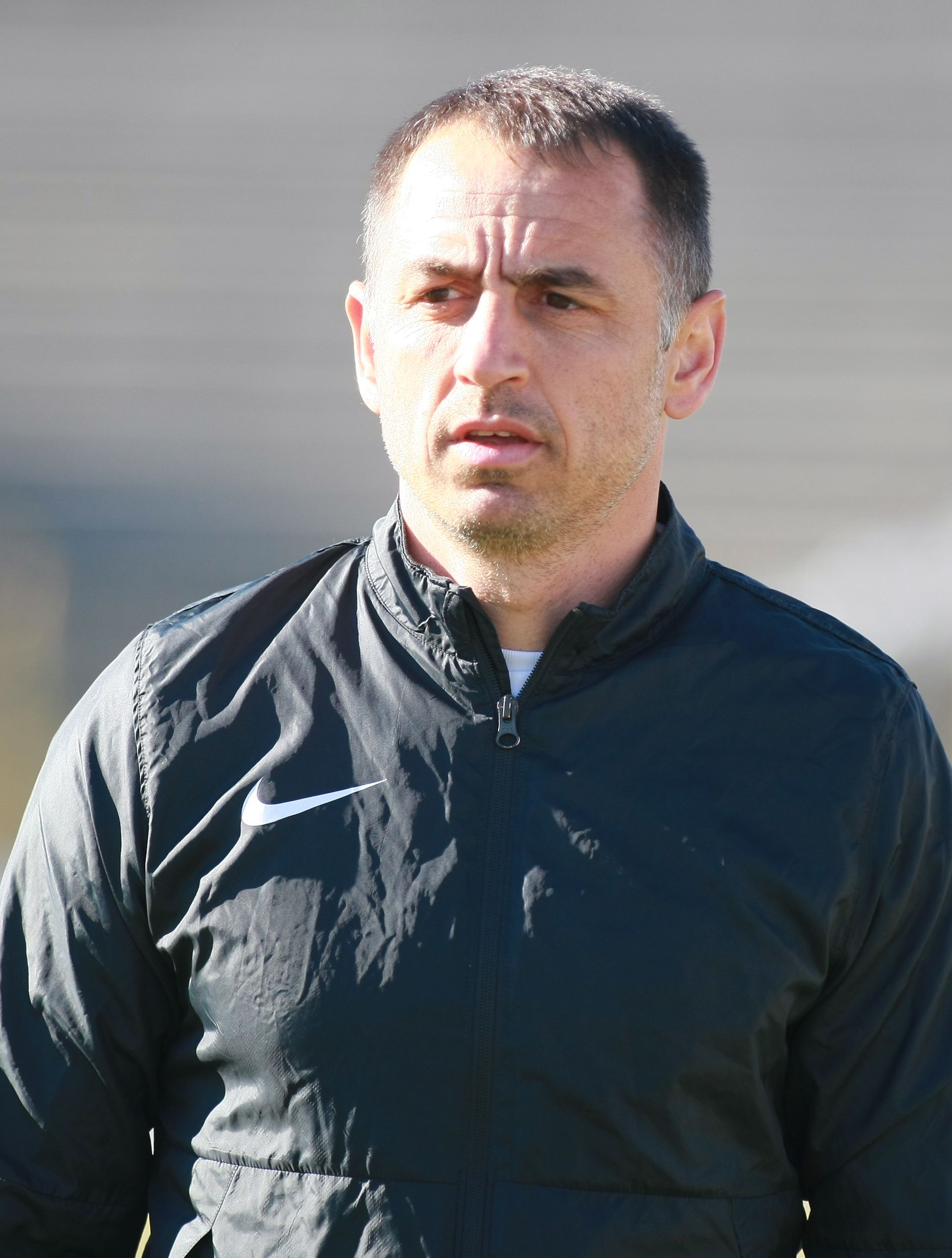
- Iliev in 2022

Personal information
- Full name: Georgi Iliev Rusev
- Date of birth: 5 September 1981 (age 45)
- Place of birth: Varna, Bulgaria
- Height: 5 ft 10 in (1.78 m)
- Position: Central midfielder

Youth career
- –1999: Cherno More

Senior career*
| Years | Team | Apps | (Gls) |
| 1999–2003 | Cherno More | 72 | (13) |
| 1999–2000 | → Svetkavitsa (loan) | 5 | (0) |
| 2003–2005 | Lokomotiv Plovdiv | 67 | (8) |
| 2005–2008 | CSKA Sofia | 57 | (3) |
| 2008–2014 | Cherno More | 135 | (35) |
| 2014–2015 | Shijiazhuang Yongchang | 37 | (13) |
| 2015–2019 | Cherno More | 111 | (23) |
| 2019 | Lokomotiv Plovdiv | 19 | (4) |
| Total | | 503 | (99) |

International career
| 2004–2020 | Bulgaria | 24 | (2) |

Managerial career
- 2021–2022: Lokomotiv Plovdiv (assistant manager)
- 2023–2025: Qingdao Hainiu (assistant manager)
- 2025–: Bulgaria U17 (assistant manager)
- 2026–: Dobrudzha Dobrich (assistant manager)
- * Club domestic league appearances and goals

Georgi Iliev Rusev (Bulgarian: Георги Илиев Русев; born 5 September 1981) is a Bulgarian former professional footballer who played as a midfielder, notably for Cherno More, where he made over 350 appearances for the club in all competitions. Iliev is the second highest scorer for Cherno More in the Bulgarian top flight with 71 goals.

His playing career included also spells at Lokomotiv Plovdiv and CSKA Sofia, as well as with Shijiazhuang Yongchang in China. Iliev holds the record for the highest number of appearances in the Bulgarian First League, with 461 (318 for Cherno More, 86 for Lokomotiv and 57 for CSKA). He also gained 24 Bulgaria caps between 2004 and 2019.

== Club career ==
=== Cherno More ===
Born in Varna, Iliev was taken on by Cherno More at an early age and signed a professional contract in July 2000. His debut came on 14 October 2000 at Hristo Botev Stadium ending in a 1–0 defeat to Botev Plovdiv. On 21 October, he went on to score his first competitive goal for Cherno More against Litex Lovech on his 2nd appearance for the club. For three years in Cherno More, Iliev earned 72 appearances playing in the A PFG, scored 13 goals.

=== Lokomotiv Plovdiv ===
In 2003, Iliev was transferred to Lokomotiv Plovdiv. He made his first appearance in a 4–1 win over Marek on 16 August 2003. In his first season at Lokomotiv, they won their first ever A PFG championship. On 31 July 2004, Iliev helped Lokomotiv win the Bulgarian Supercup and he made his debut for the Bulgarian national side under coach Hristo Stoichkov in the same year. On 29 September 2005, he scored his first ever European goals for Lokomotiv, in a 1–2 loss against Bolton Wanderers in the UEFA Cup.

=== CSKA Sofia ===
On 16 December 2005, CSKA Sofia signed Georgi Iliev to a three-year deal. On 5 March 2006, he made his competitive debut for CSKA in a 1–0 victory over Botev Plovdiv. During the 2006–07 season Iliev netted his first CSKA goal. He scored on 5 August 2006 in a 2–0 away victory over Cherno More. On 18 April 2007, Georgi scored CSKA's second in a 2–0 home win against Botev Plovdiv. Iliev netted CSKA's only and his third goal in a 1–0 win against Beroe Stara Zagora on 7 October 2007. With CSKA he was a Champion of Bulgaria for 2008 and holder of Bulgarian Cup for 2006.

=== Return to Cherno More ===
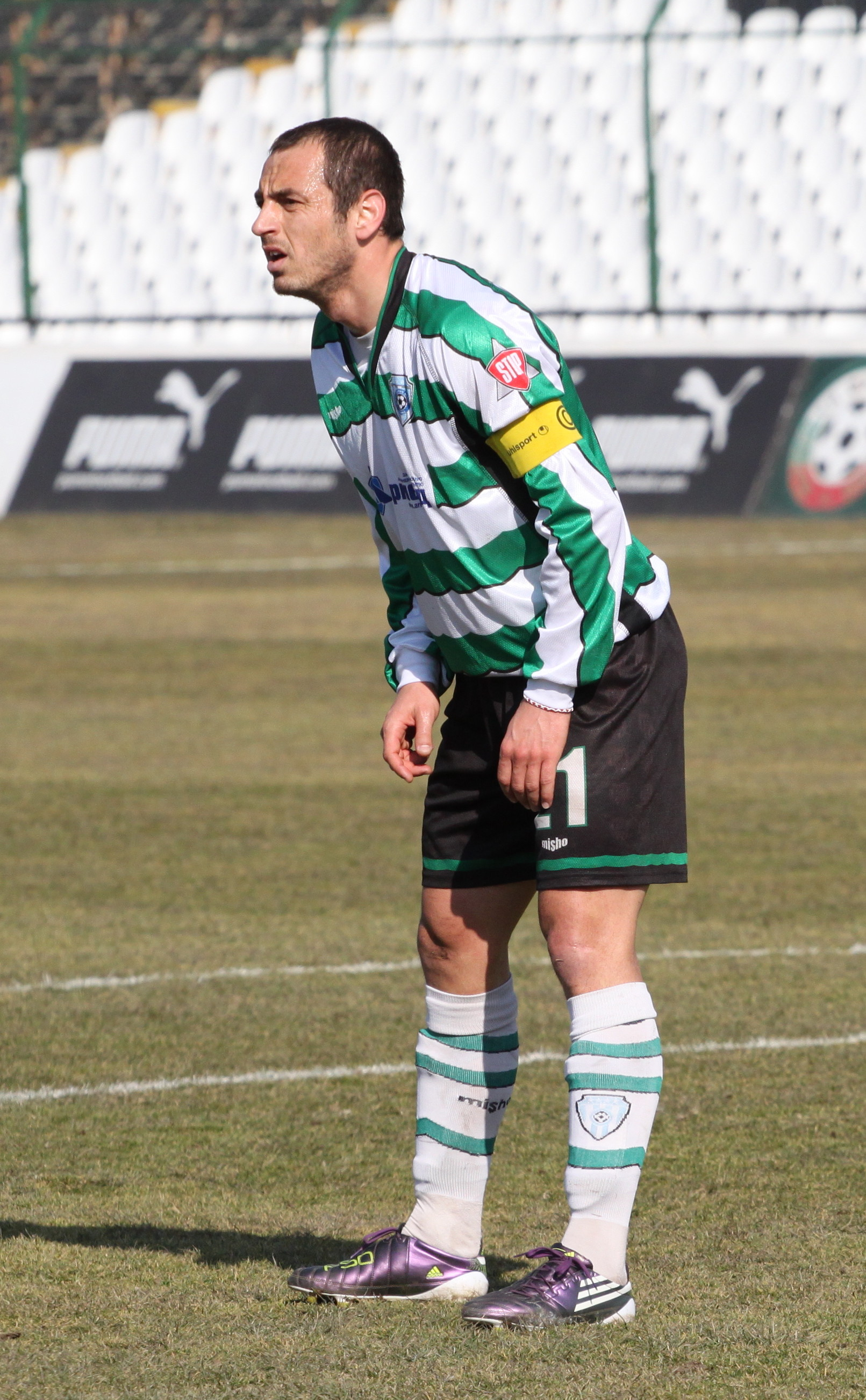
Iliev playing for Cherno More in 2011

In June 2008, Iliev made a comeback for his first team Cherno More. On 2 October 2008, Georgi scored the 2nd goal for the Sailors in the UEFA Cup match against VfB Stuttgart in the away 2–2 draw at the Mercedes-Benz Arena. Iliev took over the captaincy of Cherno More when Aleksandar Aleksandrov was transferred to Levski Sofia in 2009. On 26 October 2009, he made his 100th league appearance for Cherno more in a 1–1 draw against Slavia Sofia, scoring the only goal. On 18 April 2012, Iliev scored a hat-trick in the 7–1 win over Kaliakra Kavarna.

=== Shijiazhuang Yongchang ===
Iliev signed with Chinese side Shijiazhuang Yongchang on 6 January 2014 on a two-year deal for a reported fee of €100,000. He finished 2014 season in the China League One as the club's top scorer with 9 goals, helping his team to gain promotion to the Chinese Super League for first time in club's history. On 5 April 2015 he scored his first goal for Shijiazhuang in Chinese Super League in a 1–2 away loss to Jiangsu Sainty.

=== Second return to Cherno More ===
Iliev returned for his third stint with his hometown club in 2016. In his 300th match for Cherno More in the country's top flight he scored twice against Dunav Ruse on 26 October 2018 to become the second highest scoring player in the history of Cherno More. The game also marked Iliev's 423rd appearance in First Professional Football League, surpassing another Cherno More legend, Todor Marev, as the footballer with the 4th highest number of appearances in the league's history.

=== Release from Cherno More and return to Lokomotiv Plovdiv ===
Iliev, along with five other senior players, was omitted from the team squad for Cherno More's away game against eventual champions Ludogorets on the last day of the 2018-19 season. After the match, which Ludogorets won 4–1 to become Bulgarian champions for the eight consecutive year, Cherno More's manager Ilian Iliev confirmed that the players have been released after failing a polygraph test concerning their conduct in the 1–3 defeat against title-hopefuls CSKA Sofia on 4 May in Varna. The manager claimed undertaking the test was "unpleasant, but voluntary." Georgi Iliev strongly contested the accusations stemming from the results, calling them "a filthy lie", and insisting on his and his colleagues' innocence. The six players undertook second polygraph test, which they organized and which results showed them in the clear. The legitimacy of the test and the company that took it were widely questioned in Bulgarian media.
On 12 May 2019, Georgi Iliev signed a one-year contract with Lokomotiv Plovdiv, where he was part of the championship winning team in 2003-2004. In an emotional debut at Ticha Stadium in the first round of the 2019–2020 season against former club Cherno More Varna, Iliev provided an assist, but ultimately Cherno More prevailed 3–1.

== International career ==
An occasional member of the Under 21 team, Iliev marked his international début under Hristo Stoichkov on 29 November 2004 in a friendly game against Egypt. His first goal for Bulgaria came against Iceland on 7 September 2005. He has so far been capped 24 times for Bulgaria.

== Career statistics ==
=== Club ===
Appearances and goals by club, season and competition
| Club | Division | Season | League | | Cup | | Europe | | Other | | Total | |
| Club | Division | Season | Apps | Goals | Apps | Goals | Apps | Goals | Apps | Goals | Apps | Goals |
|---|---|---|---|---|---|---|---|---|---|---|---|---|
| Cherno More | B Group | 1999–00 | 0 | 0 | 0 | 0 | – | – | – | – | 0 | 0 |
| Cherno More | A Group | 2000–01 | 18 | 2 | 3 | 2 | – | – | – | – | 21 | 4 |
| Cherno More | A Group | 2001–02 | 36 | 8 | 1 | 0 | – | – | – | – | 37 | 8 |
| Cherno More | A Group | 2002–03 | 18 | 3 | 3 | 0 | – | – | – | – | 21 | 3 |
| Cherno More | Total | | 72 | 13 | 7 | 2 | 0 | 0 | 0 | 0 | 79 | 15 |
| Svetkavitsa (loan) | B Group | 1999–00 | 5 | 0 | 0 | 0 | – | – | – | – | 5 | 0 |
| Lokomotiv Plovdiv | A Group | 2003–04 | 27 | 1 | 5 | 0 | – | – | – | – | 32 | 1 |
| Lokomotiv Plovdiv | A Group | 2004–05 | 27 | 5 | 4 | 0 | 2 | 0 | 1 (Note: 2004 Bulgarian Supercup) | 0 | 34 | 5 |
| Lokomotiv Plovdiv | A Group | 2005–06 | 13 | 2 | 1 | 0 | 3 | 1 | – | – | 17 | 3 |
| Lokomotiv Plovdiv | Total | | 72 | 8 | 10 | 0 | 5 | 1 | 1 | 0 | 88 | 9 |
| CSKA Sofia | A Group | 2005–06 | 13 | 0 | 2 | 0 | – | – | – | – | 15 | 0 |
| CSKA Sofia | A Group | 2006–07 | 28 | 2 | 3 | 0 | 5 | 0 | 1 (Note: 2006 Bulgarian Supercup) | 0 | 37 | 2 |
| CSKA Sofia | A Group | 2007–08 | 16 | 1 | 0 | 0 | 0 | 0 | – | – | 16 | 1 |
| CSKA Sofia | Total | | 57 | 3 | 5 | 0 | 5 | 0 | 1 | 0 | 68 | 3 |
| Cherno More | A Group | 2008–09 | 20 | 3 | 1 | 0 | 5 | 1 | – | – | 26 | 4 |
| Cherno More | A Group | 2009–10 | 16 | 4 | 2 | 2 | 4 | 0 | – | – | 22 | 6 |
| Cherno More | A Group | 2010–11 | 26 | 9 | 2 | 0 | – | – | – | – | 28 | 9 |
| Cherno More | A Group | 2011–12 | 28 | 10 | 1 | 0 | – | – | – | – | 29 | 10 |
| Cherno More | A Group | 2012–13 | 29 | 7 | 2 | 0 | – | – | – | – | 31 | 7 |
| Cherno More | A Group | 2013–14 | 16 | 2 | 2 | 0 | – | – | – | – | 18 | 2 |
| Cherno More | Total | | 135 | 35 | 10 | 2 | 9 | 1 | 0 | 0 | 154 | 38 |
| Shijiazhuang Yongchang | Super League | 2014 | 26 | 10 | – | – | – | – | – | – | 26 | 10 |
| Shijiazhuang Yongchang | Super League | 2015 | 11 | 3 | 0 | 0 | – | – | – | – | 11 | 3 |
| Shijiazhuang Yongchang | Total | | 37 | 13 | 0 | 0 | 0 | 0 | 0 | 0 | 37 | 13 |
| Cherno More | First League | 2015–16 | 14 | 4 | – | – | – | – | – | – | 14 | 4 |
| Cherno More | First League | 2016–17 | 30 | 3 | 2 | 0 | – | – | – | – | 32 | 3 |
| Cherno More | First League | 2017–18 | 35 | 6 | 0 | 0 | – | – | 1 (Note: Play-off for Europa League) | 0 | 36 | 6 |
| Cherno More | First League | 2018–19 | 32 | 10 | 3 | 0 | – | – | – | – | 35 | 10 |
| Cherno More | Total | | 111 | 23 | 5 | 0 | 0 | 0 | 1 | 0 | 117 | 23 |
| Lokomotiv Plovdiv | First League | 2019–20 | 19 | 4 | 2 | 0 | 4 | 0 | 1 (Note: 2019 Bulgarian Supercup) | 0 | 26 | 4 |
| Career total | | | 503 | 99 | 38 | 4 | 23 | 2 | 4 | 0 | 568 | 105 |

=== International ===
Appearances and goals by national team and year
| National team | Year | Apps | Goals |
|---|---|---|---|
| Bulgaria | 2004 | 1 | 0 |
| Bulgaria | 2005 | 7 | 1 |
| Bulgaria | 2006 | 4 | 0 |
| Bulgaria | 2007 | 0 | 0 |
| Bulgaria | 2008 | 0 | 0 |
| Bulgaria | 2009 | 0 | 0 |
| Bulgaria | 2010 | 0 | 0 |
| Bulgaria | 2011 | 0 | 0 |
| Bulgaria | 2012 | 2 | 0 |
| Bulgaria | 2013 | 5 | 1 |
| Bulgaria | 2014 | 4 | 0 |
| Bulgaria | 2019 | 1 | 0 |
| Total | | 24 | 2 |

Scores and results lists Bulgaria's goals first

| No | Date | Venue | Opponent | Score | Result | Competition |
|---|---|---|---|---|---|---|
| 1 | 7 September 2005 | Vasil Levski National Stadium, Sofia, Bulgaria | Iceland | 2–2 | 3–2 | 2006 World Cup qualification |
| 2 | 4 June 2013 | Almaty Central Stadium, Almaty, Kazakhstan | Kazakhstan | 1–0 | 2–1 | Friendly |

== Honours ==
Lokomotiv Plovdiv

- A Group: 2003–04
- Bulgarian Cup: 2019–20
- Bulgarian Supercup: 2004

CSKA Sofia

- A Group: 2007–08
- Bulgarian Cup: 2005–06
- Bulgarian Supercup: 2006
