= Arantes =

Arantes may refer to:

- Ariadna Arantes (born 1984), Brazilian makeup artist and YouTuber
- Altino Arantes Marques (1876–1965), President of São Paulo
  - Altino Arantes Building, a skyscraper located in São Paulo, Brazil
- Pelé (1940–2022), real name Edson Arantes do Nascimento, Brazilian footballer
- Everson Arantes de Oliveira (born 1982), Brazilian footballer
- Valmir Pontes Arantes (born 1981), Brazilian footballer
- Guilherme Arantes (born 1953), Brazilian singer-songwriter and pianist
- Rômulo Arantes (1957–2000), Brazilian swimmer, actor and singer
