= Valmir =

Valmir is a male given name. Notable people with this name include:

- Valmir (footballer, born 1979), Brazilian footballer
- Valmir Aparecido Franci (born 1990), Brazilian footballer
- Valmir Assunção (born 1964), Brazilian politician and farmer
- Valmir Berisha (born 1996), Swedish footballer
- Valmir Furlani (born 1969), Brazilian footballer
- Valmir Louruz (1944–2015), Brazilian football manager
- Valmir Lucas (born 1989), Brazilian footballer
- Valmir Matoshi (born 2003), Swiss footballer
- Valmir Nafiu (born 1994), Macedonian footballer
- Valmir Nunes (born 1964), Brazilian runner
- Valmir Pontes Arantes (born 1981), Brazilian footballer
- Valmir Prascidelli (born 1964), Brazilian politician
- Valmir Ribeiro Siqueira (born 1986), Brazilian footballer
- Valmir Seferi (born 1993), Finnish footballer
- Valmir Sulejmani (born 1996), Kosovar footballer
- Valmir Veliu (born 2000), Kosovan footballer
