= Georgi Kakalov =

Georgi Kakalov may refer to:

- Georgi Ivanov Kakalov (born 1940), retired Bulgarian military officer and the first Bulgarian cosmonaut
- Georgi Kakalov (footballer) (born 1984), Bulgarian footballer
