= Adrián Fernández (footballer, born 1980) =

Argentine footballer

Personal information
- Full name: Adrián Gustavo Fernández
- Date of birth: 28 November 1980 (age 45)
- Place of birth: San Martín, Argentina
- Height: 1.78 m (5 ft 10 in)
- Position: Striker

Senior career*
| Years | Team | Apps | (Gls) |
| 1998–2003 | Nueva Chicago | 102 | (28) |
| 2003–2004 | El Porvenir | ? | (?) |
| 2004 | Colo-Colo | 19 | (3) |
| 2005 | The Strongest | 12 | (6) |
| 2006 | Al-Shaab | ? | (?) |
| 2006–2007 | Schaffhausen | 26 | (3) |
| 2007–2008 | St. Gallen | 25 | (3) |
| 2008 | Cherno More | 12 | (4) |
| 2009–2010 | Chernomorets Burgas | 47 | (14) |
| 2011–2012 | Hapoel Ramat Gan | 28 | (10) |
| 2012–2013 | Ironi Ramat Hasharon | 26 | (3) |
| 2013–2014 | Hapoel Petah Tikva | 27 | (9) |
| 2014–2015 | Doxa Katokopias FC | 0 | (0) |
| 2014 | Maccabi Herzliya | 22 | (4) |
| Total | | 346 | (97) |
- * Club domestic league appearances and goals

Adrián Gustavo 'Carucha' Fernández (born 28 November 1980) is an Argentine former professional footballer who played as a striker.

== Career ==
Fernández was born in General San Martín Partido, Greater Buenos Aires. Between 1998 and 2003, 'Carucha' played in second-line Argentine football teams, such as Nueva Chicago and El Porvenir. In spite of his poor background, during 2004, Fernandez arrived at Colo-Colo.

In Colo Colo, Fernández debuted in the most important match in the Chilean league: the superclásico (Colo Colo v/s Universidad de Chile).

After his Chilean experience, 'Carucha' played in the Bolivian The Strongest, Saudi Arabia and in the Swiss league.

In July 2008 he went to Bulgaria and signed with Cherno More Varna. On 14 November 2008, he scored two goals for Cherno More in the most important match against Spartak Varna (The derby of Varna) at Ticha Stadium. He scored goals in the 60th and 73rd minute. The result of the match was a 5–0 win for Cherno More.

In January 2009 Fernández signed a contract with Chernomorets Burgas. Up to the end of the 2008–09 season he played in 11 matches for the club and scored 5 goals. On 7 December 2010, he was released from Chernomorets Burgas.

On 15 July 2011, Fernández signed a contract with Israeli second league team Hapoel Ramat Gan. At Hapoel Ramat Gan he scored 10 goals in 28 matches. On 30 May 2012, he signed a contract with Ironi Ramat Hasharon for one season. On 31 May 2013, he signed a contract with the third Israeli team in his career, Hapoel Petah Tikva. On 8 September 2013, Fernández debuted in a match against Hapoel Katamon, in this match he scored his first goal for Petah Tikva in the 26th minute.

On 26 August 2014, he signed to Maccabi Herzliya.
