= Kristian Sprećaković =

German footballer (1978–2022)

Personal information
- Date of birth: 12 June 1978
- Place of birth: Räckelwitz, Germany
- Date of death: 19 July 2022 (aged 44)
- Height: 1.78 m (5 ft 10 in)
- Position: Defensive midfielder

Senior career*
Years	Team	Apps	(Gls)
1996–1999	Karlsruher SC II		
1999–2000	Darmstadt 98	6	(0)
2000–2002	1. FC Schweinfurt 05	74	(7)
2003	Darmstadt 98	11	(0)
2003	SSV Reutlingen	27	(4)
2004–2005	SV Wehen	65	(7)
2005–2007	SV Elversberg		
2008	Cherno More Varna	2	(0)
2008–2009	TV Hardheim		
2009	Kickers Würzburg		
- * Club domestic league appearances and goals

Kristian Sprećaković (12 June 1978 – 19 July 2022) was a German footballer who played as a defensive midfielder.

== Career ==
Sprećaković played with 1. FC Schweinfurt 05 in the 2. Bundesliga during the 2001-02 season. On 7 January 2008, Sprećaković moved to Bulgarian club Cherno More Varna on a free transfer. He made his unofficial debut for Cherno More in a friendly match against Chernomorets Burgas on 23 January 2008 playing for 45 minutes while Cherno More won 2–0.

== Death ==
Sprećaković died on 19 July 2022, at the age of 44, from cancer.
