= Ariadna Arantes =

Brazilian make-up artist and YouTuber

- Arantes in 2022
- Born: 3 June 1984 (age 42); Rio de Janeiro, Brazil
- Occupations: Make-up artist, YouTuber

Ariadna Thalia da Silva Arantes (Rio de Janeiro, 3 June 1984) is a Brazilian makeup artist and YouTuber, who was the first trans woman to participate in the television program Big Brother Brasil.

== Biography ==
Arantes was born on 3 June 1984, in the city of Rio de Janeiro.

She became known for her participation in Big Brother Brasil 11.

After her elimination, Ariadna trained as an actress and worked as a journalist, presenting a segment on RedeTV!. After some time, she moved to Italy, where she had lived before joining the reality show. She returned to Brazil in 2021 to participate in the fifth edition of the program No Limite, where she was the first trans woman participant.

In 2013, she was the first trans woman to be a samba school queen for Unidos da Vila Santa Tereza. She had previously been a muse for Unidos de Vila Isabel, in Rio, in 2011, and a highlight at Vai-Vai, in São Paulo, in 2012. In 2022, she was a samba school queen for Unidos de Vila Isabel, in Rio.

In July 2024, Arantes accepted an invitation to film footage for "BBB: O Documentário," which celebrates the 25th anniversary of the reality show. She cut short her vacation in Australia and paid for her own expenses. In January 2025, during the documentary's airing, she learned she would not be in it. After protesting, she ended up being included in one of the episodes.

On 30 July 2026, Arantes posted a video on social media celebrating after winning a lawsuit against influencer Lívia Zaruty for transphobia.

== Political career ==
In March 2022, Arantes joined the Brazilian Socialist Party (PSB) to run for the position of federal deputy. She received 4,885 votes and was not elected. After the result, she left the country and stated that she had suffered transphobia.
