= Valmir (footballer, born 1979) =

Brazilian footballer

Personal information
- Full name: Josue Dos Santos
- Date of birth: 11 April 1979 (age 47)
- Place of birth: Brazil
- Height: 1.82 m (6 ft 0 in)
- Position: Midfielder

Team information
- Current team: Brusque Futebol Clube

Senior career*
Years	Team	Apps	(Gls)
- Bahia
2008–2010	Minyor	27	(4)
2010	Brusque Futebol Clube		
- * Club domestic league appearances and goals as of 1 October 2008

Josue Dos Santos or simply Valmir (born 11 April 1979) is a Brazilian football player. He currently plays for Brusque Futebol Clube. Valmir is a central midfielder who plays in the holding midfield role or as an attacking midfielder. Despite often being used in a defensive position, he is mainly an attacking player.

== Football career ==
In Brazil Josue Dos Santos played for Esporte Clube Bahia. Valmir signed with Bulgarian Minyor Pernik together with young compatriot Leandro De Miranda Almeyda in July 2008. He made his debut in Bulgarian A PFG on 9 August 2008 in a match against Lokomotiv Sofia. Valmir played for 90 minutes. The result of the match was a 0:1 loss for Minyor. On 23 August, the midfielder scored his first goal for Minyor against Lokomotiv Mezdra.

Valmir played for Associação Chapecoense de Futebol in the 2007 Campeonato Catarinense.
