= Valmir (footballer, born 1981) =

Brazilian footballer

Personal information
- Full name: Valmir Pontes Arantes
- Date of birth: May 16, 1981 (age 45)
- Place of birth: Umuarama, Brazil
- Height: 1.70 m (5 ft 7 in)
- Position: Midfielder

Team information
- Current team: SC Brühl

Senior career*
Years	Team	Apps	(Gls)
- Santos
- Lugano
2002–2003	FC Wil	2	(0)
- Sion
- Ostuni Sport
2006	FC Chur 97	13	(1)
2007–2008	FC Gossau	29	(2)
2009–	SC Brühl		
- * Club domestic league appearances and goals as of 09:06, 7 October 2008 (UTC)

Valmir Pontes Arantes (born 16 May 1981) is a Brazilian footballer. He plays for SC Brühl.

Valmir was signed by FC Gossau in January 2007, and won promotion in summer 2007 to Swiss Challenge League.
