= Evgheni Hmaruc =

Moldovan former professional footballer (born 1977)

Personal information
- Full name: Evgheni Hmaruc
- Date of birth: 13 June 1977 (age 49)
- Place of birth: Tiraspol, Moldavian SSR, Soviet Union
- Height: 1.90 m (6 ft 3 in)
- Position: Goalkeeper

Senior career*
Years	Team	Apps	(Gls)
1994–1995	Nistru Cioburciu	15	(0)
1996	Tiligul Tiraspol	5	(0)
1997	Victoria Cahul	5	(0)
1997–2000	Tiligul Tiraspol	71	(0)
2000–2002	Chernomorets Novorossiysk	0	(0)
2002	→ Constructorul (loan)	0	(0)
2002–2003	Nea Salamis FC	26	(0)
2003	Dynamo SP	4	(0)
2004–2005	CSKA Sofia	24	(0)
2006	Tiligul-Tiras Tiraspol	19	(0)
2007–2008	Persija Jakarta	33	(0)
2008–2009	Cherno More	3	(0)
2009–2010	Nistru Otaci	19	(0)
2010–2011	Dinamo Bender	17	(0)
2011–2014	Dinamo-Auto Tiraspol	59	(0)

International career
1997–1999	Moldova U21	10	(0)
2000–2006	Moldova	30	(0)
- * Club domestic league appearances and goals

Evgheni Hmaruc (Russian: Евгений Хмарук; born 13 June 1977) is a Moldovan former professional footballer who played as a goalkeeper.

== Club career ==
He was loaned to Constructorul Cioburciu in March 2002.

He joined CSKA Sofia in February 2004, signing a 2 1/2-year deal.

Although his contract would run out in June 2006, he was allowed on trial at FC Luch-Energia Vladivostok in January 2006 before moving back to Tiligul Tiraspol. In January 2018 he was loaned to Persikabo.

== International career ==
Hmaruc had made 30 appearances for the senior Moldova national football team, including as no.1 goalkeeper of 2006 FIFA World Cup qualification (UEFA).
