= Staņislavs Pihockis =

Latvian footballer

Personal information
- Full name: Staņislavs Pihockis
- Date of birth: 9 August 1988 (age 38)
- Place of birth: Riga, Latvian SSR, Soviet Union (now Republic of Latvia)
- Height: 1.83 m (6 ft 0 in)
- Position: Defender

Team information
- Current team: FK Ogre

Senior career*
Years	Team	Apps	(Gls)
2007	FK Riga	4	(0)
2008	FK Ventspils	0	(0)
2008	FK Riga	7	(0)
2009	Cherno More	1	(0)
2009	Metta-Latvijas Universitāte	8	(0)
2010	Gulbene-2005	16	(1)
2011	Kruoja Pakruojis	25	(0)
2012	FC Jūrmala	29	(0)
2013	FB Gulbene	15	(3)
2014–2015	Hammerfest FK		
2016	Skonto	13	(1)
2017–	FK Ogre		

International career^{‡}
2004–2006	Latvia U-17	2	(0)
2006–2008	Latvia U-19	9	(2)
2008–2010	Latvia U-21	4	(0)
- * Club domestic league appearances and goals as of 22 October 2013 ‡ National team caps and goals as of 22 October 2013

Staņislavs Pihockis (born 9 August 1988) is a Latvian football defender. He is a right wingback, currently playing for Hammerfest FK in the Norwegian 3. divisjon.

== Career ==
Pihockis started his career in FK Riga. With the team he played in a matches of Intertoto Cup 2008 against Elfsborg. In December 2008 he was invited by Bulgarian side Cherno More Varna to join trial period. On 10 January 2009 Stanislavs signed for three years with Cherno More, but only appeared in one Bulgarian A PFG match. In Summer 2009, he became a free agent and then he joined Latvian 1.division team FS Metta-Latvijas Universitāte. Before the start of the 2010–2011 season he signed for the ambitious Latvian team FB Gulbene-2005. In 2011, he left Gulbene, signing for FK Kruoja Pakruojis in Lithuanian A Lyga. In 2012 Pihockis returned to Latvia, signing a contract with the Latvian Higher League club FC Jūrmala. He played in Jūrmala for one season, making 29 league appearances. Before the start of the 2013 season Pihockis returned to his former club FB Gulbene, playing in the Latvian First League. Having played 15 matches and scored 3 goals, Pihockis made a move to Norway in September 2013 joining the 3. divisjon club Hammerfest FK.
