= Stanislav Stoyanov (footballer) =

Bulgarian footballer

Personal information
- Full name: Stanislav Petrov Stoyanov
- Date of birth: 10 September 1976 (age 50)
- Place of birth: Bulgaria
- Height: 1.80 m (5 ft 11 in)
- Position: Defensive midfielder

Senior career*
Years	Team	Apps	(Gls)
1994–1999	Dobrudzha Dobrich	97	(7)
1999–2011	Cherno More	240	(10)
Total		337	(17)
- * Club domestic league appearances and goals as of 12 January 2012

Stanislav Petrov Stoyanov (Bulgarian: Станислав Стоянов) (born 10 September 1976) is a Bulgarian former football midfielder who spent most of his career at Cherno More Varna.

== Career ==
=== Dobrudzha ===
In 1994, he signed his first professional contract with Dobrudzha Dobrich. During the 1994–95 season, Stoyanov scored his first Dobrudzha goal on his A PFG debut against Beroe Stara Zagora in a 2–0 away victory. He spent 5 seasons of his career at the club of Dobrich, playing in 97 games and scoring 7 goals.

=== Cherno More ===
In June 1999, Stoyanov joined Cherno More Varna for an undisclosed fee. He settled well and became an integral part of the Cherno More team that won promotion to A PFG in 2000, after a 6-year absence. He made his debut on 7 August 1999, in a 1–0 home victory over Lokomotiv Plovdiv. His first goal came on 18 September, in a 3–1 defeat away to Vidima-Rakovski. During his first three seasons at Ticha Stadium, he plays as a right side midfielder and a right winger.

On 2 October 2008, Stoyanov captained Cherno More in a UEFA Cup 2–2 away draw versus VfB Stuttgart.

On 16 May 2010, he made his 200th appearance for the team in the A PFG in a 2–1 home win against Montana.

On 12 January 2012, Stoyanov announced his retirement after his contract expired on 31 December 2011.

== Career statistics ==
As of 29 November 2011

Club	Season	League		Cup		Europe		Total	
Club	Season	Apps	Goals	Apps	Goals	Apps	Goals	Apps	Goals
Dobrudzha Dobrich	1994–95	10	1	?	?	–	–	10	1
Dobrudzha Dobrich	1995–96	17	3	?	?	–	–	17	3
Dobrudzha Dobrich	1996–97	25	2	?	?	–	–	25	2
Dobrudzha Dobrich	1997–98	23	1	?	?	–	–	23	1
Dobrudzha Dobrich	1998–99	22	0	?	?	–	–	22	0
Dobrudzha Dobrich	Total	97	7	0	0	0	0	97	7
Cherno More	1999–00	28	2	2	0	–	–	30	2
Cherno More	2000–01	22	3	0	0	–	–	22	3
Cherno More	2001–02	21	2	0	0	–	–	21	2
Cherno More	2002–03	8	0	3	0	–	–	11	0
Cherno More	2003–04	23	1	3	0	–	–	26	1
Cherno More	2004–05	24	0	0	0	–	–	24	0
Cherno More	2005–06	23	0	3	0	–	–	26	0
Cherno More	2006–07	13	0	2	0	–	–	15	0
Cherno More	2007–08	25	2	3	1	2	1	28	3
Cherno More	2008–09	26	0	1	0	6	0	33	0
Cherno More	2009–10	15	0	0	0	2	0	17	0
Cherno More	2010–11	10	0	2	0	–	–	12	0
Cherno More	2011-12	2	0	0	0	-	-	2	0
Cherno More	Total	240	10	19	1	10	1	269	12
Career totals		337	17	19	1	10	1	366	19

== Achievements ==
- Bulgarian Cup finalist with Cherno More Varna: 2 times - 2006,2008
