= Tigran Gharabaghtsyan =

Armenian footballer (born 1984)

Personal information
- Date of birth: 6 June 1984 (age 42)
- Place of birth: Yerevan, Soviet Union
- Height: 1.94 m (6 ft 4 in)
- Position: Forward

Youth career
- 2000–2004: Banants Yerevan

Senior career*
Years	Team	Apps	(Gls)
2000–2001	Malatia Yerevan		(16)
2001–2002	Spartak Yerevan		
2002–2006	Banants Yerevan		
2006–2008	Pyunik Yerevan	26	(7)
2008	Cherno More Varna	8	(0)
2008	Pyunik Yerevan	11	(2)
2009–2010	Kilikia Yerevan	40	(7)
2010	Atyrau	0	(0)
2011–2013	Ararat Yerevan	47	(1)

International career
2003–2006	Armenia U21	7	(2)
2007	Armenia	2	(0)
- * Club domestic league appearances and goals

Tigran Gharabaghtsyan (Armenian: Տիգրան Ղարաբաղցյան, born 6 June 1984) is an Armenian former professional footballer who played as a forward. He was a member of the Armenia national team, for which he twice appeared after his debut in a friendly match against Panama on 14 January 2007.

== Honours ==
Pyunik Yerevan

- Armenian Premier League: 2006, 2007, 2008
- Armenian Supercup: 2006

Cherno More Varna

- Bulgarian Cup finalist: 2008
