= Karamfil Ilchev =

Bulgarian footballer

Personal information
- Full name: Karamfil Andreev Ilchev
- Date of birth: 7 January 1979 (age 47)
- Place of birth: Tervel, Bulgaria
- Height: 1.86 m (6 ft 1 in)
- Position: Goalkeeper

Youth career
- 1989–1997: Dobrudzha Dobrich

Senior career*
Years	Team	Apps	(Gls)
1997–2003	Dobrudzha Dobrich	32	(0)
2003	Akademik Svishtov	14	(0)
2004	Chernomorets Burgas	?	(?)
2004–2005	Dobrudzha Dobrich	22	(0)
2005–2010	Cherno More	51	(0)
2010	Beroe Stara Zagora	12	(0)
2012–2013	FC Brossard	36	(0)
2017	CS St-Hubert	2	(0)
Total		169	(0)
- * Club domestic league appearances and goals

Karamfil Ilchev (Bulgarian: Карамфил Илчев; born 7 January 1979) is a Bulgarian former professional footballer who played as a goalkeeper.

== Career ==
His first club was Dobrudzha Dobrich.

=== Cherno More ===
Ilchev was enrolled in Cherno More Varna during the summer 2005-transfer window after he played for Akademik Svishtov and Dobrudzha. Fill, as the "sailors" fans call the goalkeeper, had the task to replace the ex-titular goalkeeper Tihomir Todorov. During his first two seasons Ilchev was a stable reserve of Ivaylo Petrov and Krasimir Kolev and played in only four matches, mainly in the Bulgarian Cup.

The goalkeeper managed to become first choice for the team during the season 2007/2008, when Petrov was already at CSKA Sofia and Kolev often suffered from injuries. During this season Ilchev played in 28 matches and has a major role for the good performance of "Cherno More" in the championship and in the Bulgarian Cup. From summer 2008 Fill has a very serious competition from the Moldovian national goalkeeper Evgheni Hmaruc, who came in Cherno More from the Indonesian Persija Jakarta. In spite of this the Bulgarian was the first choice of the coach Nikola Spasov for the debut appearance of the Sailors in the UEFA Cup. Ilchev played very well in many matches as he was particularly good against the Israeli vice-champion Maccabi Netanya.

During the 2008–09 season, Ilchev earned 20 appearances playing in A PFG. He played one match in Bulgarian Cup, and in the UEFA Cup, he played 5 matches.

=== Beroe ===
On 6 July 2010 Ilchev signed a two-year contract with Beroe Stara Zagora. He earned 11 appearances playing for Beroe in A PFG, before surprisingly retiring at the age of 31, in December 2010. The reason was a move to Canada for business reasons in the near future. He, however, hinted that this may not be the end of his football career, and he may start to play for a Canadian side in the near future. He later signed for FC Brossard as an assistant coach and as a goalkeeper for the newly formed PLSQ.

== Honours ==
=== Club ===
- Cherno More
  - Bulgarian Cup:
    - Runner-up (2): 2005–06, 2007-08
