= Peris (footballer) =

Brazilian footballer

Personal information
- Full name: Jovaldir Ferreira
- Date of birth: 9 January 1982 (age 44)
- Place of birth: Rosário, Maranhão, Brazil
- Height: 1.70 m (5 ft 7 in)
- Position: Left-back

Senior career*
Years	Team	Apps	(Gls)
2000–2001	Moto Club		
2002–2004	Ceará		
2005–2007	Americano (MA)		
2005–2006	→ Santa Cruz (loan)		
2006	→ Bahia (loan)		
2007–2009	Cherno More	36	(0)
2009–2010	Apollon Limassol	4	(0)
- * Club domestic league appearances and goals

Jovaldir Ferreira (born 9 January 1982), known as Peris, is a Brazilian former professional footballer who played as a left-back.

== Career ==
=== Brazil career ===
Peris started his career in Moto Club de São Luís. He signed a 5-year contract in January 2005 with Americano (MA)., however he left for Santa Cruz in temporary deal. He played once in 2005 Copa do Brasil. In January 2006 the deal was renewed. In September 2006, he was signed by Bahia of Brazilian third division.

=== Cherno More ===
Peris came to Cherno More in summer 2007, together with his compatriots Djalma and Fabinho Recife. After a short try-out, the coach Nikola Spasov liked him, and he signed a three-year contract with the football club from Varna on 12 July 2007. Peris quickly became part of the main team. The Brazilian player is uncompromising in defence and very dangerous in attack. He stands out with fastness, good technique and precise passing. He has a strong kick and often shoots from long distances. Because of his qualities, shortly after he came to Bulgaria, he earned the nickname "The New Roberto Carlos". In A PFG the Brazilian player won the title of one of the best left backs. In the matches against VfB Stuttgart for UEFA Cup in the 2008 campaign, he left excellent impressions in the football specialists with his good play and in the German press appeared information that VfB Stuttgart and VfL Bochum wanted the player in their teams.

=== Apollon Limassol ===
In summer 2009 he signed a 2-year contract with Apollon Limassol.

== Achievements ==
- Bulgarian Cup finalist with Cherno More Varna: 2008

Third place in Bulgaria with Cherno More Varna: 2009
