= Ricardo André (footballer, born 1982) =

Portuguese footballer

Personal information
- Full name: Ricardo André Duarte Pires
- Date of birth: 24 October 1982 (age 44)
- Place of birth: Amadora, Portugal
- Height: 1.83 m (6 ft 0 in)
- Position: Midfielder

Youth career
- 1993–1998: Benfica
- 1998–1999: Estoril
- 1999–2001: Benfica

Senior career*
Years	Team	Apps	(Gls)
2001–2003	Benfica B	29	(0)
2003–2005	Paços Ferreira	41	(0)
2006	Setúbal B	15	(0)
2006–2007	Gondomar	22	(1)
2007–2009	Cherno More	45	(3)
2010–2011	Chernomorets Burgas	41	(2)
Total		193	(6)
- * Club domestic league appearances and goals

Ricardo André Duarte Pires (born 24 October 1982 in Amadora, Lisbon) is a retired Portuguese footballer who played as a defensive midfielder.

== Football career ==
After unsuccessfully emerging through S.L. Benfica's youth system – he only appeared for its B-side – André signed with F.C. Paços de Ferreira from the Primeira Liga in 2003, playing 15 games and suffering team relegation in his first season. After one more year he signed with Vitória de Setúbal's reserves, also in the third division as Benfica's second team.

André subsequently competed in the second level with Gondomar SC, then moved to Bulgaria in the 2007 summer by joining PFC Cherno More Varna. He made his competitive debut on 12 July, in a UEFA Intertoto Cup match against FK Makedonija Gjorče Petrov, playing the entire 4–0 win. On 28 August 2007 he scored his first goal for the club, but in a 1–3 loss to PFC Slavia Sofia.

In January 2010 André switched to PSFC Chernomorets Burgas, in the same country. He was released in July of the following year, retiring shortly after at the age of only 29.
