= Aleksandar Aleksandrov (footballer, born April 1986) =

Bulgarian retired footballer

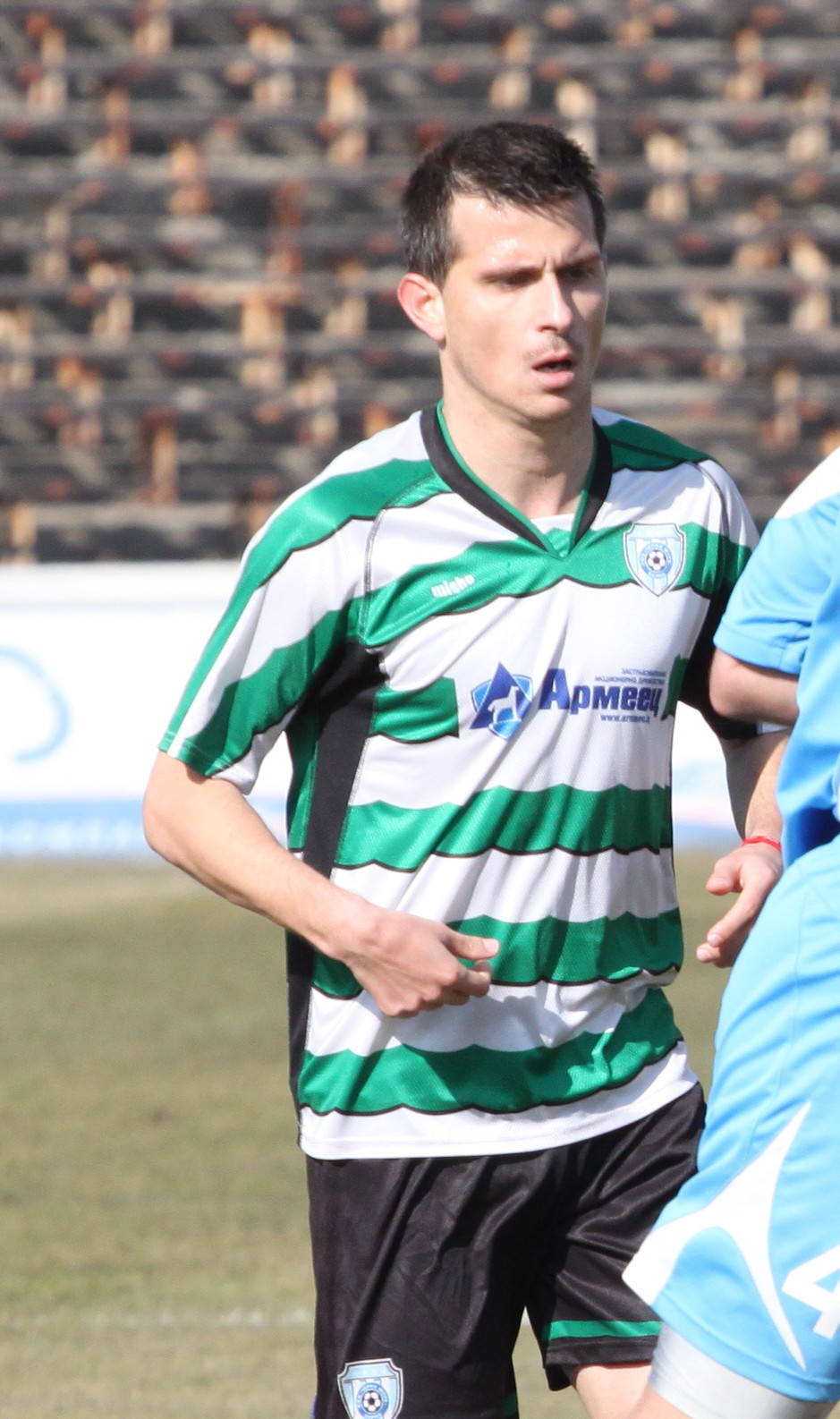
- Aleksandrov playing for Cherno More in 2011

Personal information
- Full name: Aleksandar Dragomirov Aleksandrov
- Date of birth: 13 April 1986 (age 40)
- Place of birth: Shumen, Bulgaria
- Height: 1.86 m (6 ft 1 in)
- Position: Centre back

Youth career
- Volov Shumen

Senior career*
Years	Team	Apps	(Gls)
2003–2005	Chernomorets Burgas	27	(0)
2005–2013	Cherno More	217	(5)
2014–2015	Ludogorets Razgrad	24	(0)
2016–2017	Levski Sofia	38	(1)
2017	Cherno More	14	(0)
Total		320	(5)

International career^{‡}
2006–2007	Bulgaria U21	6	(1)
2013–2016	Bulgaria	15	(0)
- * Club domestic league appearances and goals as of 14 December 2017 ‡ National team caps and goals as of 23:12, 13 November 2016 (UTC)

Aleksandar Aleksandrov (Bulgarian: Александър Александров; born 13 April 1986 in Shumen) is a Bulgarian retired footballer who played as a defender.

== Career ==
Aleksandrov's first club was Volov Shumen. In June 2003, while he was 17 years old, Aleksandrov signed with Chernomorets Burgas and made his debut in the A Group. In the summer of 2005, due to the big financial crisis at the club, he was released and several weeks later he accepted the offer from Cherno More Varna.

=== Cherno More ===
Aleksandrov made his league debut for Cherno More on 17 September 2005, appearing as a substitute in a 4–0 home win against Belasitsa Petrich. On 29 April 2006, he scored his first goal and the winner in Cherno More's away game at Pirin Blagoevgrad, a 1–0 win. In his first season playing for Cherno More, he made 21 appearances in the A PFG.

His second goal for the club came in a 2–1 win over Chernomorets Burgas on 20 October 2007, his first goal at Cherno More's Ticha stadium.

On 1 November 2008, Aleksandrov scored Cherno More's second goal in their 3–0 victory over Sliven 2000. On 29 November, he scored his second goal of the 2008–09 season in a 4–0 home win against Minyor Pernik.

On 5 April 2011, Aleksandrov was sent off against CSKA Sofia in a 2–0 defeat of the Bulgarian Cup, his first red card in a Cherno More shirt. Two weeks later, he signed a two-year contract extension, keeping him at Cherno More until 2013.

=== Ludogorets Razgrad ===
Aleksandrov signed with Bulgarian champions Ludogorets Razgrad in January 2014 and made his first A Group appearance for the team on 30 March 2014, playing the full 90 minutes in the 1–1 home draw against Botev Plovdiv.

=== Return to Cherno More ===
On 18 June 2017, Aleksandrov was announced as Cherno More's new signing. On 28 July 2017, he made his second debut in a 1–0 home win over Dunav Ruse, coming on as substitute for Mariyan Ognyanov. On 14 December 2017, his contract was terminated by mutual consent.

== International career ==
Between 2006 and 2008 Aleksandrov played for the Bulgaria national under-21 football team. In March, 2008, the Bulgarian national coach Plamen Markov called Aleksandar in the Bulgaria national football team for the friendly match with Finland. Lyuboslav Penev gave him his debut on 30 May 2013 in an away friendly against Japan when Aleksandar came on as a substitute for the injured Iliya Milanov. On 7 February 2015, he played the full 90 minutes of the 0:0 draw with Romania in a non-official friendly match. On 28 March 2015, he was a starter and remained on the pitch over the course of the entire match in the 2:2 tie with Italy in a Euro 2016 qualifier, which marked new manager Ivaylo Petev's official debut.

== Career statistics ==
As of 11 December 2017

Club	Season	League		Cup		Europe		Total	
Club	Season	Apps	Goals	Apps	Goals	Apps	Goals	Apps	Goals
Chernomorets Burgas	2003–04	13	0	0	0	–		13	0
Chernomorets Burgas	2004–05	14	0	1	0	–		15	0
Chernomorets Burgas	Total	27	0	1	0	0	0	28	0
Cherno More	2005–06	21	1	2	0	–		23	1
Cherno More	2006–07	26	0	2	0	–		28	0
Cherno More	2007–08	27	1	4	0	1	0	33	1
Cherno More	2008–09	20	2	1	0	5	0	26	2
Cherno More	2009–10	23	0	3	0	4	0	30	0
Cherno More	2010–11	23	0	3	0	–		27	0
Cherno More	2011–12	29	1	1	0	–		30	1
Cherno More	2012–13	30	0	2	0	–		32	0
Cherno More	2013–14	18	0	2	0	–		20	0
Cherno More	Total	217	5	20	0	10	0	247	5
Ludogorets Razgrad	2013–14	8	0	2	0	0	0	10	0
Ludogorets Razgrad	2014–15	13	0	2	0	5	0	21	0
Ludogorets Razgrad	2015–16	3	0	2	0	2	0	6	0
Ludogorets Razgrad	Total	24	0	6	0	7	0	37	0
Levski Sofia	2015–16	13	0	0	0	–		13	0
Levski Sofia	2016–17	25	0	0	0	2	0	27	0
Levski Sofia	Total	38	0	0	0	2	0	40	0
Cherno More	2017–18	14	0	0	0	–		14	0
Career totals		320	5	27	0	19	0	366	5

== Honours ==
=== Club ===
Ludogorets

- Bulgarian A Group (2): 2013–14, 2014–15
- Bulgarian Cup. (1): 2013–14
- Bulgarian Supercup (1): 2014
