= Georgi Kakalov (footballer) =

Bulgarian footballer

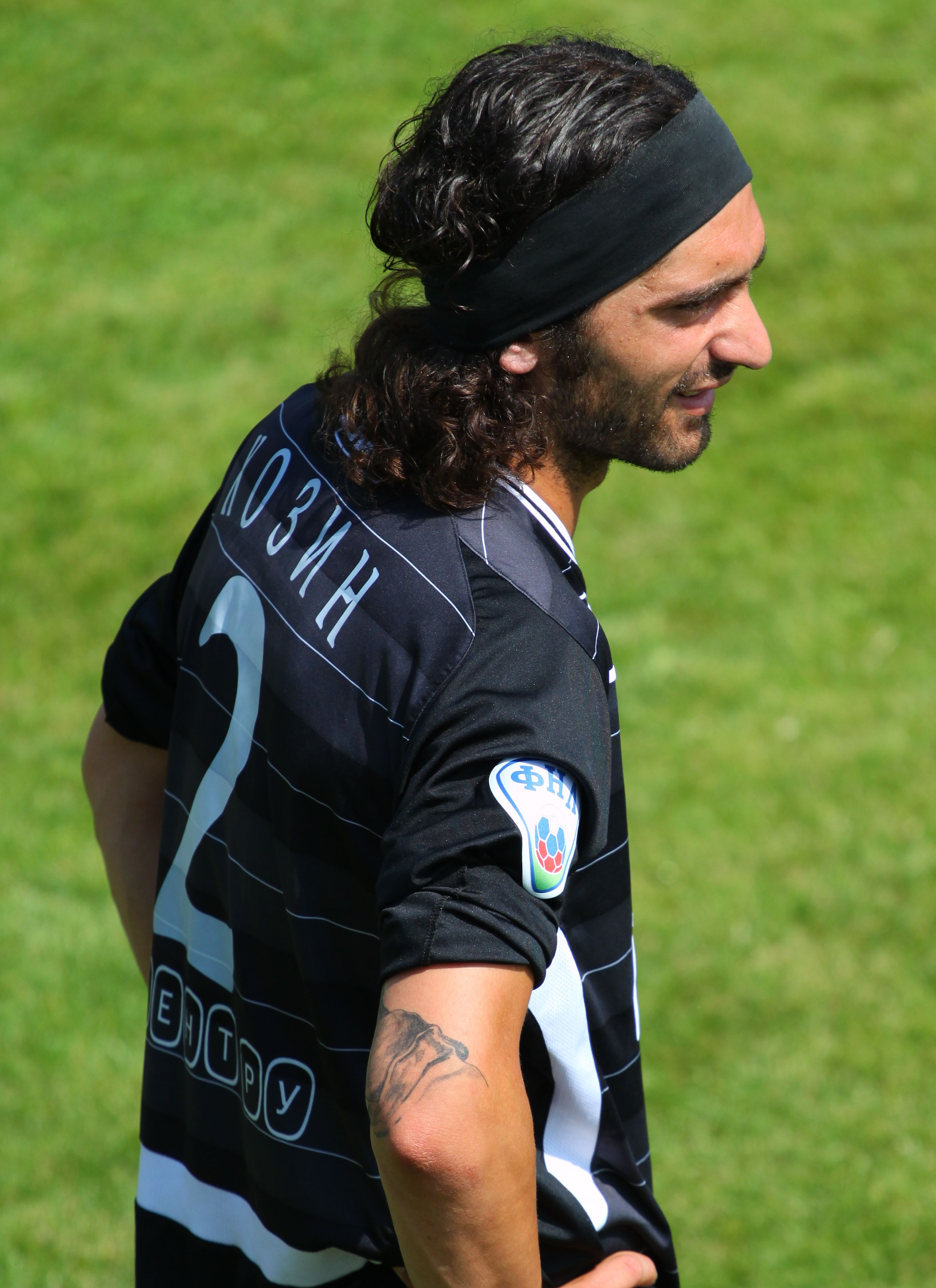

Personal information
- Full name: Georgi Vasilev Kakalov
- Date of birth: 18 July 1984 (age 42)
- Place of birth: Gotse Delchev, Bulgaria
- Height: 1.80 m (5 ft 11 in)
- Position: Forward

Senior career*
| Years | Team | Apps | (Gls) |
| 2002–2004 | Litex Lovech | 3 | (0) |
| 2003 | → Belite orli (loan) | 25 | (17) |
| 2004 | → Vidima-Rakovski (loan) | 8 | (1) |
| 2005 | Spartak Pleven | 11 | (0) |
| 2005–2008 | Botev Plovdiv | 58 | (12) |
| 2008–2010 | Dinamo Minsk | 10 | (0) |
| 2009 | → Cherno More (loan) | 19 | (6) |
| 2010 | → Olympiakos Nicosia (loan) | 12 | (5) |
| 2010 | Astra Ploieşti | 0 | (0) |
| 2010 | Botev Plovdiv | 8 | (6) |
| 2011 | Pirin Blagoevgrad | 0 | (0) |
| 2011 | Vidima-Rakovski | 12 | (1) |
| 2012 | Etar 1924 | 10 | (4) |
| 2012 | Shumen 2010 | 6 | (0) |
| 2013 | Haskovo | 6 | (1) |
| 2013 | Botev Vratsa | 6 | (0) |
| 2014 | FK Turnovo | 9 | (1) |
| 2014 | Oborishte | 9 | (2) |
| 2015 | Panelefsiniakos F.C. | ? | (?) |
| 2015 | Lokomotiv Mezdra | 15 | (2) |
| 2016 | Ergene Velimeşe Spor | ? | (?) |
| 2016 | Omonia Aradippou | 0 | (0) |
| 2017 | Litex Lovech | 2 | (3) |
| 2017–2018 | Borislav Parvomay | | |

International career
| 2008 | Bulgaria | 1 | (0) |
- * Club domestic league appearances and goals as of 5 April 2017

Georgi Kakalov (Bulgarian: Георги Какалов; born 18 July 1984) is a Bulgarian former footballer.

== Career ==
The then 18-year-old subsequently went to Litex Lovech. For two years he stayed at Litex but only played in three games. In the 2003–04 season, Kakalov was loaned to Vidima-Rakovski Sevlievo, then to Belite orli. From January 2005 to June 2005 Kakalov played for Spartak Pleven.Since the start of season 2005–06 was playing for Botev Plovdiv

He moved to Belarusian side Dinamo Minsk in 2008. On 8 January 2009 he was loaned for 6 months to Cherno More Varna and then loaned from February 2010 to Olympiakos Nicosia.

On 21 June 2010, he signed with Liga I team Astra Ploieşti as a free agent.

In July 2017, Kakalov joined Third League club Borislav Parvomay.

== International career ==
He is a former member of the Bulgaria U21 side. Kakalov made his debut for Bulgaria national football team on 26 March 2008 in the 2:1 home win against Finland.
