= Radoslav Bachev =

Bulgarian footballer

Personal information
- Full name: Radoslav Ivanov Bachev
- Date of birth: 9 April 1981 (age 45)
- Place of birth: Simitli, Bulgaria
- Height: 1.81 m (5 ft 11 1/2 in)
- Position: Left back

Youth career
- Septemvri Simitli

Senior career*
Years	Team	Apps	(Gls)
2000–2005	Pirin Blagoevgrad	74	(5)
2005–2006	Marek Dupnitsa	24	(1)
2006–2011	Cherno More	95	(2)
2011	Montana	3	(0)
2012	Botev Plovdiv	5	(0)
2012–2013	Septemvri Simitli	20	(0)
2013–2014	Akademik Svishtov	15	(0)
2014–2015	Septemvri Simitli	31	(1)
- * Club domestic league appearances and goals

Radoslav Bachev (Bulgarian: Радослав Бачев; born 9 April 1981) is a Bulgarian former professional footballer who played as a defender.

== Career ==
Bachev started his professional career as a footballer at Septemvri Simitli. After that, he played for Pirin Blagoevgrad and Marek Dupnitsa, before signing with Cherno More in early 2006 as a free agent.

=== Cherno More ===
In July 2007 Bachev scored his first goal for Cherno More against FK Makedonija Gjorče Petrov in the UEFA Intertoto Cup at the Skopje City Stadium. The goal was scored in the 48th minute. The result of the match ended with a 4:0 away win for Cherno More. A year later, in July 2008, Bachev scored his second goal for the club in the first qualifying round of the UEFA Cup against UE Sant Julià. The result of the match was another 4:0 win for Cherno More.

== Achievements ==
- Bulgarian Cup finalist with Cherno More Varna: 2008
