= Daniel Georgiev =

Bulgarian footballer

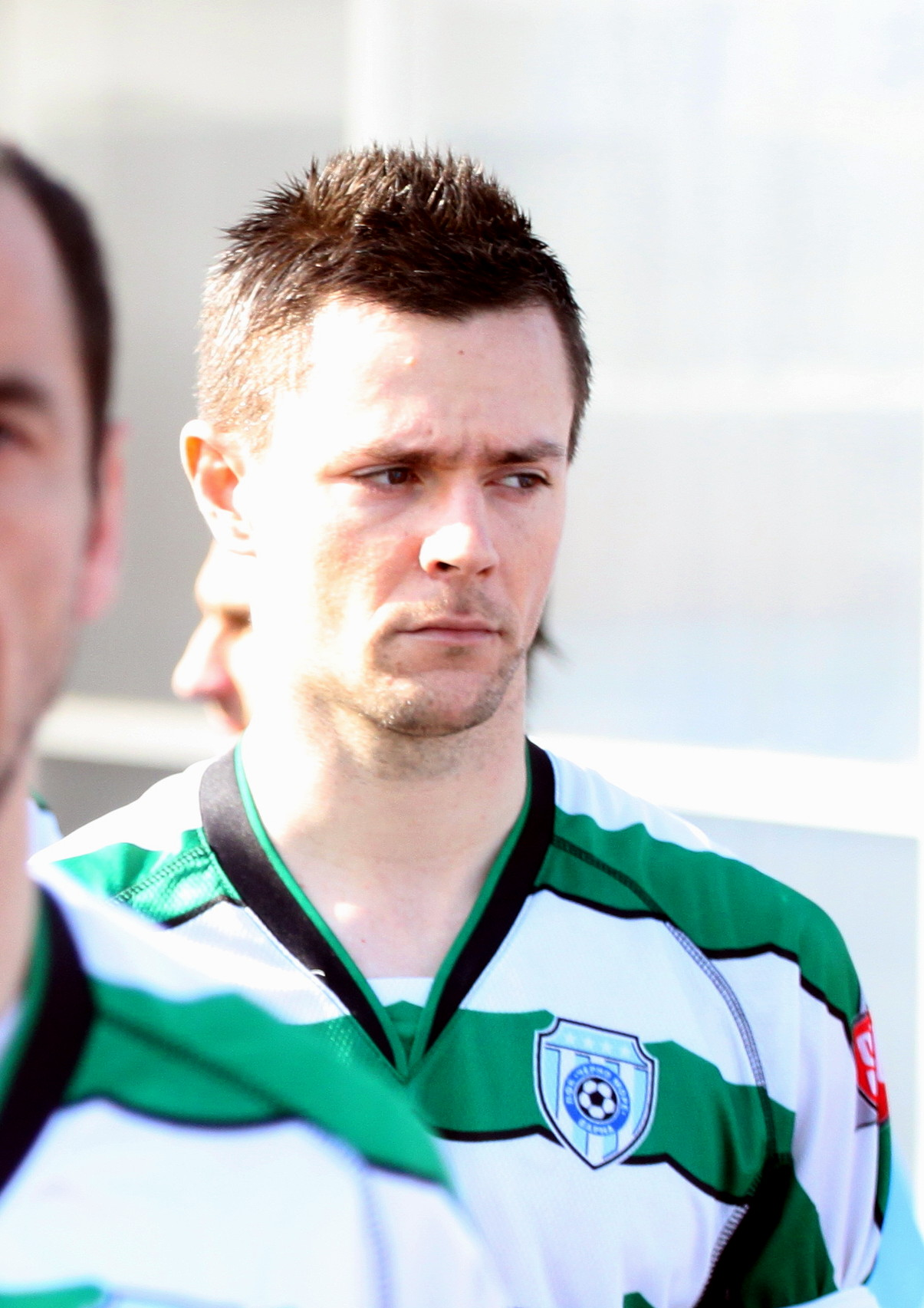

Personal information
- Full name: Daniel Atanasov Georgiev
- Date of birth: 6 November 1982 (age 43)
- Place of birth: Sofia, Bulgaria
- Height: 1.82 m (5 ft 11 1/2 in)
- Positions: Right back; defensive midfielder

Team information
- Current team: Chernomorets Balchik
- Number: 3

Youth career
- Levski Sofia

Senior career*
Years	Team	Apps	(Gls)
2000–2003	Levski Sofia	0	(0)
2000–2001	→ Sparta B (loan)	?	(?)
2002–2003	→ Dunav Ruse (loan)	6	(0)
2003–2004	Vihren Sandanski	15	(6)
2004	Baltika Kaliningrad	17	(4)
2005	Vihren Sandanski	15	(2)
2005	Lokomotiv Plovdiv	11	(1)
2006	CSKA Sofia	9	(0)
2007–2011	Cherno More	101	(12)
2011	Orduspor	0	(0)
2011–2013	Lokomotiv Plovdiv	48	(4)
2013–2017	Cherno More	94	(5)
2017	Septemvri Sofia	6	(0)
2017–2019	Montana	51	(0)
2019–	Chernomorets Balchik	74	(9)
- * Club domestic league appearances and goals as of 1 July 2023

Daniel Atanasov Georgiev (Bulgarian: Даниел Георгиев; born 6 November 1982) is a Bulgarian footballer who plays as a right back or defensive midfielder for Chernomorets Balchik.

== Career ==
Georgiev started his playing career at Levski Sofia.

Between 2005 and 2006 played in Lokomotiv Plovdiv. In 2006 he played for six months as part of the CSKA Sofia team.

In January 2007, Daniel Morales was signed by CSKA Sofia from Cherno More and Georgiev was sent to Varna together with Miroslav Manolov as part of an exchange on a co-ownership deal.

On 1 May 2009 Georgiev scored three goals for 31 minutes in a match of A PFG against Belasitsa Petrich. During the season 2008–09, he earned 22 appearances playing in A PFG, scored three goals. In the Bulgarian Cup, Daniel played one match. Georgiev's second stay in Cherno More came to an end on 29 May 2017, when his contract was terminated by mutual consent.

On 14 June 2017, Georgiev joined Septemvri Sofia. He made his debut for the team on 17 July 2017 in match against Dunav Ruse. On 31 August 2017, after the appointment of new manager Nikolay Mitov, his contract was terminated by mutual consent.

On 4 September 2017, Georgiev signed with Second League club Montana until the end of the season.

== Career statistics ==
As of 28 May 2017

Club	Season	League		Cup		Europe		Total	
Club	Season	Apps	Goals	Apps	Goals	Apps	Goals	Apps	Goals
Vihren Sandanski	2004–05	15	2	0	0	–	–	15	2
Lokomotiv Plovdiv	2005–06	11	1	1	0	2	0	14	1
CSKA Sofia	2005–06	7	0	1	0	–	–	8	0
CSKA Sofia	2006–07	2	0	0	0	0	0	2	0
Cherno More	2006–07	9	0	0	0	–	–	9	0
Cherno More	2007–08	27	4	5	2	4	1	36	7
Cherno More	2008–09	23	3	1	0	5	0	29	3
Cherno More	2009–10	17	4	2	1	4	1	23	6
Cherno More	2010–11	25	1	3	0	–	–	28	1
Lokomotiv Plovdiv	2011–12	23	2	4	0	–	–	27	2
Lokomotiv Plovdiv	2012–13	25	2	2	0	2	0	29	2
Cherno More	2013–14	36	2	3	1	–	–	39	3
Cherno More	2014–15	11	1	1	0	–	–	12	1
Cherno More	2015–16	26	1	3	0	1	0	30	1
Cherno More	2016–17	21	1	3	0	–	–	24	1

== Achievements ==
- Bulgarian Cup finalist with Cherno More Varna: 2008
- Bulgarian Cup with Cherno More Varna: 2015
- Bulgarian Cup with CSKA Sofia: 2006
