= Mihail Lazarov =

Bulgarian footballer

Personal information
- Full name: Mihail Lazarov Hristov
- Date of birth: 31 August 1980 (age 46)
- Place of birth: Varna, Bulgaria
- Height: 1.81 m (5 ft 11 in)
- Positions: Centre back; right back

Youth career
- Spartak Varna

Senior career*
Years	Team	Apps	(Gls)
2000–2002	Spartak Varna	44	(2)
2002–2003	Naftex Burgas	13	(1)
2003–2005	Spartak Varna	28	(0)
2005–2007	Rodopa Smolyan	50	(0)
2007–2012	Cherno More	52	(3)
Total		187	(6)
- * Club domestic league appearances and goals

Mihail Lazarov Hristov (Bulgarian: Михаил Лазаров) (born 31 August 1980 in Varna) is a retired Bulgarian football defender. He was a right back, but he could also play as a centre back. Lazarov's first club was Spartak Varna. He also played for Naftex Burgas, Rodopa Smolyan and Cherno More.
