= Miroslav Manolov =

Bulgarian footballer

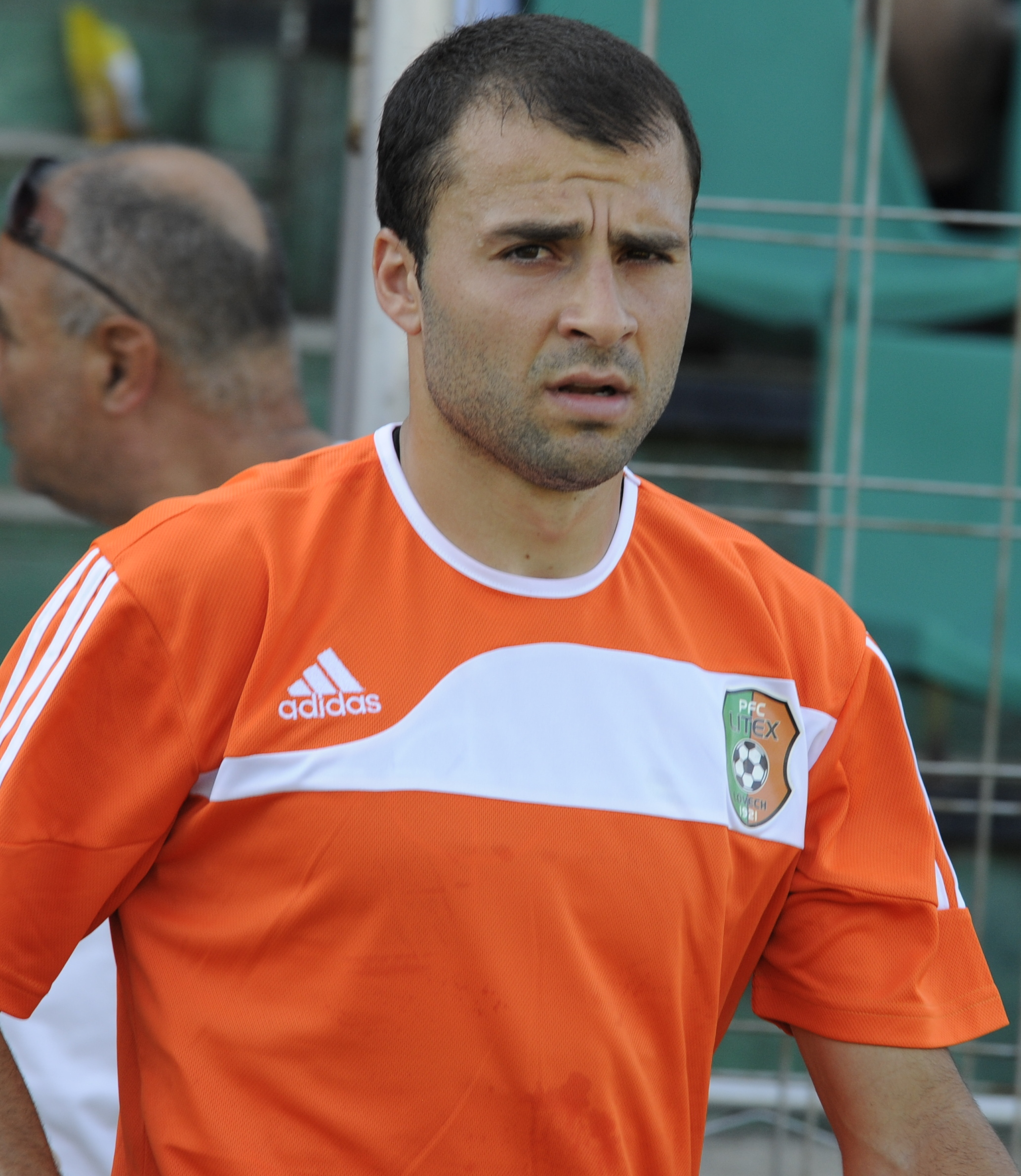

Personal information
- Full name: Miroslav Manolov Manolov
- Date of birth: 20 May 1985 (age 41)
- Place of birth: Sopot, Bulgaria
- Height: 1.84 m (6 ft 1/2 in)
- Position: Striker

Youth career
- 1993–2000: Metalik Sopot
- 2000–2003: CSKA Sofia

Senior career*
Years	Team	Apps	(Gls)
2003–2006	CSKA Sofia	9	(1)
2005–2006	→ Conegliano (loan)	29	(19)
2007–2013	Cherno More	120	(32)
2013–2014	Litex Lovech	31	(3)
2014	Cherno More	17	(2)
2015	Târgu Mureș	29	(2)
2016	Tampa Bay Rowdies 2	0	(0)
2016–2020	Levski Chicago		
2020–2021	Minyor Chicago		
Total		234	(59)

International career
2006	Bulgaria U21		
- * Club domestic league appearances and goals

Miroslav Manolov Manolov (Bulgarian: Мирослав Манолов Манолов; born 20 May 1985) is a Bulgarian former professional footballer who played as a forward.

Manolov appeared in Bulgaria's top flight for CSKA Sofia, Cherno More Varna and Litex Lovech, having also represented Romanian club Târgu Mureș.

== Career ==
=== Early career ===
Born in Sopot, Miroslav Manolov start his football career in the local club Metalik. He made his debut for the team in the Bulgarian third division in the year 2000 when he was only 15.

=== CSKA Sofia ===
Manolov made his debut during the 2003–04 season on 28 October 2003 in a match of Bulgarian Cup against Pirin Blagoevgrad, coming on as a substitute for Krasen Valkov. Unfortunately a little while after that he broke his leg in a match for the reserve squad and he could not play football for half a year.

In March 2005 Manolov was loaned out to Conegliano German, where he displays his ability to score. Manolov became the West B PFG's top goalscorer for the 2005–06 season with 19 goals in 25 matches. He returned to CSKA at the end of the season. On 27 August 2006, Manolov scored his only league goal for CSKA in a 4–0 home win over Spartak Varna.

=== Cherno More ===
On 8 January 2007, Daniel Morales was signed by CSKA Sofia from Cherno More and Manolov was sent to Varna together with Daniel Georgiev in exchange. Manolov made his debut on 5 March, in a 0–0 draw against his former club CSKA.

He scored his first goal for Cherno More on 14 July 2007, in a 3–0 home win over Makedonija Gjorče Petrov in their second round second leg tie of the Intertoto Cup. His first league goal came on 1 December, a winning header in a 1–0 against derby rivals Spartak Varna. On 5 April 2008, Manolov scored his first-ever A PFG hat-trick in his career, in a 4–1 away win over Marek Dupnitsa.

In December 2009, Manolov ruptured his anterior cruciate ligament and meniscus. He missed the rest of the 2009–10 season and the whole 2010–11 season.

Manolov made his comeback for Cherno More from a serious knee injury on 15 July 2011. He featured 18 minutes in a 1–0 pre-season friendly win against Bansko. In August 2011, Manolov was handed number 10, last worn by Daniel Dimov. His first goal of the season came on 5 November 2011 in a 2–0 home win over Beroe Stara Zagora. On 22 March 2012, Manolov scored a hat-trick in a 3–1 away win over Montana; the first goal was scored in 7 seconds, setting a new A PFG record for the quickest goal. He was sent off for the first time during his Cherno More career against the same opponent on 23 September 2012, for dangerous foul play.

=== Târgu Mureș ===
On 17 January 2015, Manolov signed a two-year contract with Romanian club Târgu Mureș, receiving the number 9 shirt.

In 2016, Manolov trialled with the Tampa Bay Rowdies. He was rostered with their National Premier Soccer League reserve team, Rowdies 2.

== Club statistics ==
Club	Season	Division	League		Cup		Europe		Total	
Club	Season	Division	Apps	Goals	Apps	Goals	Apps	Goals	Apps	Goals
CSKA Sofia	2003–04	A Group	1	0	2	0	0	0	3	0
CSKA Sofia	2004–05	A Group	1	0	0	0	0	0	1	0
Conegliano German	2004–05	B Group	4	0	0	0	–		4	0
Conegliano German	2005–06	B Group	25	19	3	1	–		28	20
CSKA Sofia	2006–07	A Group	7	1	0	0	0	0	7	1
Cherno More	2006–07	A Group	11	0	0	0	–		11	0
Cherno More	2007–08	A Group	23	9	5	1	4	1	32	11
Cherno More	2008–09	A Group	22	9	1	0	5	3	28	12
Cherno More	2009–10	A Group	15	6	1	0	4	3	20	9
Cherno More	2010–11	A Group	0	0	0	0	–		0	0
Cherno More	2011–12	A Group	24	7	0	0	–		24	7
Cherno More	2012–13	A Group	25	1	4	0	–		29	1
Litex Lovech	2013–14	A Group	31	3	6	5	0	0	37	8
Cherno More	2014–15	A Group	17	2	3	2	–		20	4
Târgu Mureș	2014–15	Liga I	17	1	0	0	–		17	1
Târgu Mureș	2015–16	Liga I	12	1	2	2	1	0	15	3
Total			234	59	27	11	14	7	275	77

== Honours ==
Târgu Mureș

- Supercupa României: 2015
