= Aleksandar Aleksandrov (footballer, born 1975) =

Bulgarian footballer

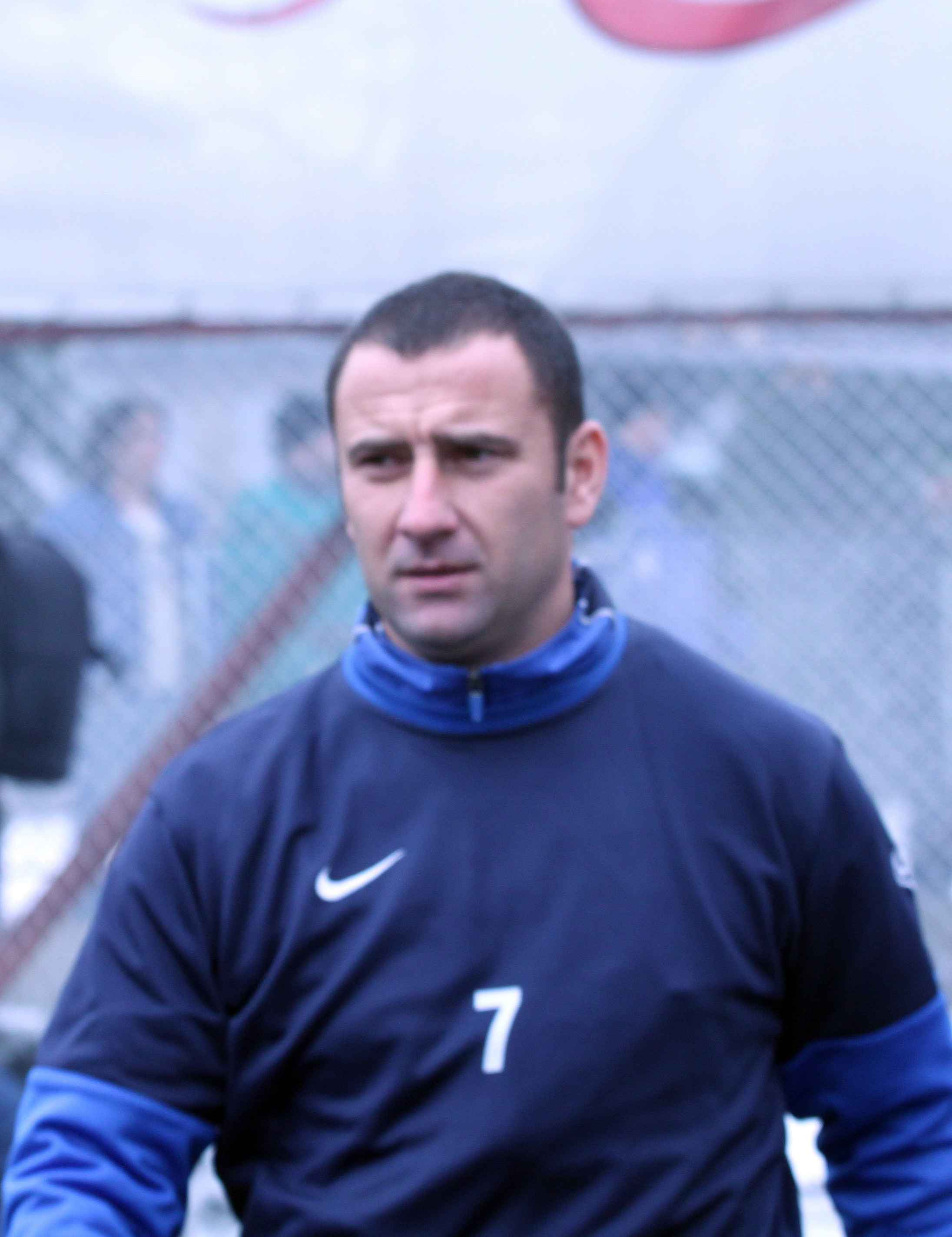

Personal information
- Full name: Aleksandar Yordanov Aleksandrov
- Date of birth: 19 January 1975 (age 51)
- Place of birth: Plovdiv, Bulgaria
- Height: 1.73 m (5 ft 8 in)
- Position: Attacking midfielder

Senior career*
Years	Team	Apps	(Gls)
1993–1997	Maritsa Plovdiv	87	(33)
1997–2000	Levski Sofia	79	(24)
2001–2002	Kocaelispor	62	(10)
2002–2005	İstanbulspor	79	(15)
2005–2006	Kayserispor	31	(6)
2006	Konyaspor	14	(2)
2007	Ankaragücü	12	(0)
2007–2009	Cherno More	58	(15)
2010–2011	Levski Sofia	27	(6)
2011–2012	Botev Plovdiv	24	(9)
Total		473	(120)

International career
1998–2003	Bulgaria	10	(1)
- * Club domestic league appearances and goals

Aleksandar Aleksandrov (Bulgarian: Александър Александров; born 19 January 1975) is a Bulgarian former professional footballer who played as an attacking midfielder.

Aleksandrov was honoured as Bulgarian Footballer of the Year in 1999 and Footballer of the Year of Varna for 2007 and for 2008.

== Club career ==
Aleksandrov was born in Plovdiv and began his career in his hometown with Maritsa Plovdiv and played there until 1997.

Then his career lead him to Sofia, as Levski Sofia were interested and bought him. He spent four years with The Blues, winning the 1997–98 Bulgarian Cup and in 2000, the double of Bulgarian Championship and Bulgarian Cup. He won "The Best Bulgarian Footballer" award in 1999.

=== Turkish teams ===
With Kocaelispor he won the Turkish Cup in 2002. After two years in Kocaelispor, he changed teams and moved to Istanbulspor AS. After İstanbulspor he played in Kayserispor and Konyaspor, then signed with Ankaragucu (2006–2007).

=== Cherno More Varna ===
In July 2007, Aleksandrov returned to Bulgaria and signed a three years contract with Cherno More Varna. The following 2007–08 season in the Bulgarian championship, he was honoured as the most valuable player in the Bulgarian A PFG.

On 28 September 2009, he terminated his contract with the Sailors, due to family difficulties and problems with the owners of the club.

=== Return to Levski ===
After 10 years, Aleksandrov returned to Levski Sofia on 5 January 2010. He signed a one-a-half-year contract with the club and was given the number 7 shirt. Aleksandrov made his re-debut for Levski on 7 March 2010 against Minyor Pernik. The result of the match was 3:1 for Levski.

In the first friendly match for 2010–11 season, Aleksandrov played with his nickname Alex, as he did in Cherno More Varna.

=== Botev Plovdiv ===
In June 2011, Aleksandrov joined Botev Plovdiv, where he would eventually retire.

== International career ==
Between 1999 and 2003 Aleksandrov played in Bulgaria national team. He earned his first cap with Bulgaria in a 3–0 victory over Luxembourg on 10 October 1999. He was capped 10 times.

== Career statistics ==
Appearances and goals by club, season and competition
Club	Season	League		Cup		Europe		Total	
Club	Season	Apps	Goals	Apps	Goals	Apps	Goals	Apps	Goals
Levski Sofia	1997–98	27	10	8	5	2	0	37	15
Levski Sofia	1998–99	18	7	3	3	4	0	25	10
Levski Sofia	1999–2000	28	6	6	1	6	0	40	7
Levski Sofia	2000–01	7	1	1	0	4	0	12	1
Levski Sofia	2009–10	10	3	0	0	0	0	10	3
Levski Sofia	2010–11	17	3	2	0	5	0	15	2
Career total		107	30	20	9	21	0	148	39

== Honours ==
Levski Sofia

- Bulgarian A Professional Football Group: 2000
- Bulgarian Cup: 1998, 2000

Kocaelispor

- Turkish Cup: 2002

Individual

- Bulgarian Footballer of the Year: 1999
- Footballer of the Year of Varna: 2007, 2008
