= Stadion Ticha =

Multi-purpose stadium in Varna, Bulgaria

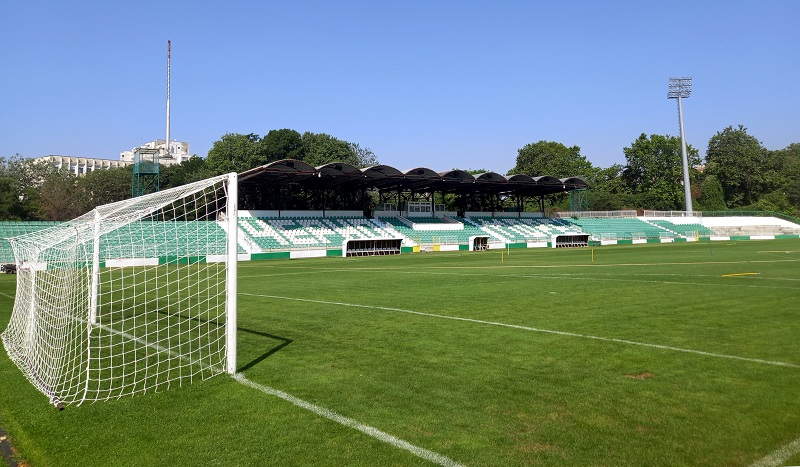
- Interactive map of Stadion Ticha
- Location: Varna, Bulgaria
- Coordinates: 43°12′57″N 27°55′53″E
- Owner: Municipality of Varna
- Operator: Cherno More Varna
- Capacity: 8,250
- Surface: Grass

Construction
- Groundbreaking: 1935
- Built: 1935
- Opened: 1935
- Renovated: 1961,1968, 2008, 2015

Tenants
- Ticha (1935–1945); Cherno More Varna (1945–present)

Stadion Ticha (Bulgarian: Стадион „Тича“, English: 'Ticha Stadium') is a multi-purpose stadium in Varna, Bulgaria, located in the Chayka district of the city. Currently, the stadium is used for football matches and is the home ground of Cherno More Varna. It has a seating capacity of 8,250 spectators. The stadium is named after the previous tenant of the club, SC Ticha and the previous name of the river Kamchiya, located 20 kilometers south of the city centre.

== History ==
The stadium was constructed and completed in 1935 with the help of volunteers and fans by an initiative held by the then-president of the club Vladimir Chakarov. It was renovated in 2008, when plastic seats were installed on the north stand. A follow-up renovation was also initiated in 2015 and in 2016 the club received 1 mln. leva from the Bulgarian Ministry of Youth and Sports for the installment of floodlights and a LED scoreboard.

The stadium's close proximity to a major boulevard intersection and residential buildings, alongside the lack of space for a nearby parking lot for the supporters, have urged the club to move to a new bigger stadium, which is scheduled to be completed by late 2018.
