= 2012–13 PFC Cherno More Varna season =

Cherno More
2012–13 season
- Chairman: Marin Mitev
- Manager: Stefan Genov (until 24 September 2012) Adalbert Zafirov (from 26 September 2012 until 17 December 2012) Georgi Ivanov (from 17 December 2012)
- A PFG: 10th
- Bulgarian Cup: 3rd round (knocked out by Levski Sofia)
- Top goalscorer: League: Georgi Iliev (7); All: Georgi Iliev (7)
- Highest home attendance: 6,500 vs Levski (30 March 2013)
- Lowest home attendance: 300 vs Strumska slava (24 November 2012)
- Average home league attendance: 2,461

This page covers all relevant details regarding PFC Cherno More Varna for all official competitions inside the 2012–13 season. These are A PFG and Bulgarian Cup.

== Transfers ==
=== In ===
Date	Pos.	Name	From	Fee
5 July 2012	DF	(Bulgaria) Martin Dechev	CSKA Sofia	Free
9 July 2012	DF	(Bulgaria) Detelin Dimitrov	Kaliakra	Free
9 July 2012	MF	(Bulgaria) Stamen Angelov	Neftochimic	Free
27 July 2012	MF	(Brazil) Edenilson Bergonsi	(Belgium) Standard Liège	Free
9 August 2012	GK	(Bulgaria) Stoyan Stavrev	Lokomotiv Plovdiv	Free
29 October 2012	MF	(Bulgaria) Todor Kolev	Free agent	Free
10 January 2013	MF	(Bulgaria) Simeon Raykov	Levski Sofia	Undisclosed
27 January 2013	MF	(Bulgaria) Kosta Yanev	CSKA Sofia	Free
30 January 2013	GK	(Bulgaria) Emil Mihaylov	Lokomotiv Sofia	Free
31 January 2013	DF	(Slovenia) Sebastjan Komel	(Belgium) Royal Antwerp	Free
23 February 2013	MF	(Spain) Cristian Hidalgo	(Cyprus) Alki Larnaca	Free
3 April 2013	FW	(France) Bruce Inkango	(Romania) Oțelul Galați	Free

=== Out ===
Date	Pos.	Name	To	Fee
25 June 2012	DF	(Bulgaria) Mihail Lazarov	Retired	N/A
25 June 2012	MF	(Bulgaria) Yancho Andreev	Kaliakra	Free
27 June 2012	FW	(Bulgaria) Rumen Nikolov	Neftochimic	Free
9 July 2012	DF	(Bulgaria) Tsvetan Yotov	Free agent	Released
14 July 2012	FW	(Bulgaria) Kristiyan Dimitrov	Svetkavitsa	Free
14 July 2012	GK	(Bulgaria) Nikolay Kirchev	Free agent	Released
17 December 2012	MF	(Bulgaria) Doncho Atanasov	Beroe	Free
17 December 2012	MF	(Bulgaria) Stamen Angelov	Neftochimic	Free
17 December 2012	MF	(Bulgaria) Hristian Popov	Svilengrad	Free
17 December 2012	DF	(Bulgaria) Ivelin Yanev	Lokomotiv Sofia	Free
17 December 2012	DF	(Bulgaria) Martin Dechev	Montana	Free
17 December 2012	GK	(Bulgaria) Petar Denchev	Lokomotiv Plovdiv	Free
17 December 2012	GK	(Bulgaria) Plamen Kolev	Vereya Stara Zagora	Free
31 December 2012	GK	(Bulgaria) Stoyan Stavrev	Retired	N/A
8 March 2013	MF	(Bulgaria) Viktor Mitev	Dunav Ruse	Free
18 April 2013	MF	(Bulgaria) Kosta Yanev	Free agent	Released

=== Loans in ===
Date	Pos.	Name	From	End date	Fee
1 July 2012	MF	(Venezuela) Marlon Fernández	(Venezuela) Deportivo Lara	23 August 2012	Free

=== Loans out ===
Date	Pos.	Name	To	End date	Fee
8 July 2012	MF	(Bulgaria) Viktor Mitev	Kaliakra	31 December 2012	Free

== Squad information ==
N	Pos.	Nat.	Name	Age	EU	Since	App	Goals	Ends	Transfer fee	Notes
1	GK	(Bulgaria)	Petar Denchev	23	EU	2010	18	0	2013	Free	(Note: Player left the club in December 2012.)
1	GK	(Bulgaria)	Emil Mihaylov	25	EU	2013	1	0	2014	Free	
3	CB	(Bulgaria)	Rosen Kolev	22	EU	2011	54	4	2014	Free	
4	LB	(Bulgaria)	Detelin Dimitrov	30	EU	2012	39	0	2015	Free	(Note: Dimitrov made 26 appearances during his first spell at the club between 2004 and 2005.)
5	DM	(Brazil)	Samuel Camazzola	30	EU	2011	61	2	2014	Free	
6	DM	(Brazil)	Edenilson Bergonsi	25	EU	2012	24	5	2015	Free	
7	AM	(Bulgaria)	Bekir Rasim	18	EU	2012	1	0	2016	Youth system	
8	DM	(Bulgaria)	Kosta Yanev	29	EU	2013	0	0	2014	Free	(Note: Player left the club in April 2013.)
9	FW	(Venezuela)	Hermes Palomino	25	Non-EU	2011	35	6	2013	Free	
10	FW	(Bulgaria)	Miroslav Manolov	28	EU	2007	119	32	2014	Free	
11	LW	(Bulgaria)	Doncho Atanasov	29	EU	2010	58	8	2014	Free	
11	LW	(Bulgaria)	Simeon Raykov	23	EU	2013	14	2	2015	Undisclosed	
12	RB	(Bulgaria)	Martin Dechev	22	EU	2012	8	0	2015	Free	
13	LW	(Bulgaria)	Todor Kolev	23	EU	2012	51	5	2013	Free	(Note: T. Kolev made 46 appearances and scored 5 goals during his first spell at the club between 2007 and 2011.)
14	FW	(Bulgaria)	Georgi Bozhilov	26	EU	2010	92	15	2013	€100,000	
15	CB	(Bulgaria)	Aleksandar Aleksandrov	27	EU	2005	199	5	2013	€30,000	
18	LB	(Bulgaria)	Ivelin Yanev	31	EU	2011	28	0	2013	Free	
18	LB	(Slovenia)	Sebastjan Komel	27	EU	2013	11	0	2015	Free	
19	DM	(Bulgaria)	Hristian Popov	22	EU	2011	22	1	2014	Free	
19	FW	(France)	Bruce Inkango	29	EU	2013	10	4	2013	Free	
20	RW	(Bulgaria)	Stamen Angelov	25	EU	2012	8	0	2015	Free	
21	CM	(Bulgaria)	Georgi Iliev (captain)	31	EU	2008	191	46	2014	€100,000	(Note: G. Iliev made 72 appearances and scored 13 goals during his first spell at the club between 2000 and 2003.)
22	GK	(Bulgaria)	Plamen Kolev	24	EU	2012	5	0	2014	Free	
23	CM	(Bulgaria)	Simeon Simeonov	29	EU	2011	30	0	2013	Free	
24	CB	(Bulgaria)	Slavi Stalev	19	EU	2012	4	0		Youth system	
25	RB	(Bulgaria)	Sasho Aleksandrov	26	EU	2010	88	2	2014	€30,000	
26	CB	(Bulgaria)	Georgi Radev	18	EU	2012	0	0	2016	Youth system	
30	RW	(Bulgaria)	Ilian Kapitanov	21	EU	2010	35	5	2013	Youth system	
33	GK	(Bulgaria)	Georgi Kitanov	18	EU	2012	30	0		Youth system	
37	GK	(Bulgaria)	Stoyan Stavrev	37	EU	2012	0	0	2012	Free	(Note: S. Stavrev retired as a player in December.)
37	GK	(Bulgaria)	Georgi Stavrev	17	EU	2013	0	0		Youth system	
77	LW	(Bulgaria)	Viktor Mitev	20	EU	2011	6	0	2013	Youth system	(Note: Player left the club in March 2013.)
83	RW	(Spain)	Cristian Hidalgo	29	EU	2013	14	1	2015	Free	
86	AM	(Venezuela)	Marlon Fernández	26	Non-EU	2012	11	1	2012	Free	(Note: Player left the club in August 2012.)
91	CB	(Bulgaria)	Zhivko Atanasov	22	EU	2012	33	1	2014	Free	
99	FW	(Bulgaria)	Atanas Iliev	18	EU	2012	6	1	2016	Youth system	

- Last updated: May 26, 2013

== Competitions ==
=== Pre-season and Friendlies ===
6 July 2012	Cherno More	6 – 1	Kaliakra	Varna
18:00 EEST	Manolov 8', 22'; Palomino 50', 87'; Kapitanov 79'; G. Iliev 83'	Report	Kunev 89'	Stadium: Ticha; Attendance: 300; Referee: Tsvetan Krastev

12 July 2012	Etar	2 – 1	Cherno More	Veliko Tarnovo
11:00 EEST	Stankev 8'; Ouarguini 78'	Report	Manolov 18'	Stadium: Ivaylo; Attendance: 2,000

14 July 2012	Bansko	1 – 1	Cherno More	Bansko
18:30 EEST	Dinkov 84' (pen.)	Report	G. Iliev 36'	Stadium: St Petar

17 July 2012	Slavia	1 – 2	Cherno More	Bansko
18:30 EEST	Vitor 78'	Report	Manolov 8'; Z. Atanasov 42'	Stadium: St Petar; Referee: Stefan Spasov

19 July 2012	Hamrun Spartans (Malta)	0 – 2	(Bulgaria) Cherno More	Bansko
18:00 EEST		Report	R. Kolev 31'; Manolov 58'	Stadium: Piry Complex

21 July 2012	Pirin Gotse Delchev	1 – 2	Cherno More	Dobrinishte
11:00 EEST	Lazarov 18'	Report	Palomino 56', 64'	Stadium: Dobrinishte; Referee: Ivaylo Stoyanov

24 July 2012	Minyor Pernik	4 – 2	Cherno More	Bansko
18:30 EEST	Stoychev 8'; Okechukwu 38', 90'; Vasilev 64'	Report	Edenilson 6'; Manolov 53'	Stadium: Piry Complex

25 July 2012	Septemvri Simitli	1 – 2	Cherno More	Simitli
11:00 EEST	Topuzov 76'	Report	G. Iliev 50'; S. Aleksandrov 58'	Stadium: Struma; Referee: Stefan Apostolov

28 July 2012	Chernomorets Burgas	2 – 2	Cherno More	Burgas
19:30 EEST	Yordanov 74'; Tsonkov 90'	Report	S. Aleksandrov 34'; Z. Atanasov 58'	Stadium: Lazur

1 August 2012	Cherno More	4 – 0	Dobrudzha	Varna
18:30 EEST	G. Iliev 8'; Madzhirov 48' (o.g.); A. Iliev 79', 89'	Report		Stadium: Ticha

5 September 2012	Cherno More	2 – 2	Neftochimic	Varna
17:50 EEST	G. Iliev 52'; Manolov 57'	Report	Manev 82'; Moldovanov 90'	Stadium: Mladost

10 October 2012	Kaliakra	1 – 3	Cherno More	Kavarna
16:30 EEST	Ivanov 79'	Report	Slavov 4' (o.g.); Bozhilov 11'; Manolov 45'	Stadium: Kavarna; Attendance: 80; Referee: Dimitar Gerchev

12 October 2012	Septemvri Tervel	0 – 3	Cherno More	Tervel
16:00 EEST		Report	Dimitrov 2'; Manolov 26' (pen.); A. Iliev 56'	Stadium: Septemvri

5 February 2013	Kuban Krasnodar (Russia)	3 – 0	(Bulgaria) Cherno More	Belek, Turkey
17:30 EET	Popov 4'; Bucur 49', 82'	Report

7 February 2013	Costuleni (Moldova)	0 – 2	(Bulgaria) Cherno More	Side, Turkey
14:50 EET		Report	Palomino 68'; T. Kolev 87'

9 February 2013	Baník Ostrava (Czech Republic)	2 – 1	(Bulgaria) Cherno More	Antalya, Turkey
15:30 EET	Kraut 25'; Majtán 81'	Report	Manolov 65'

13 February 2013	Torpedo Moscow (Russia)	3 – 0	(Bulgaria) Cherno More	Side, Turkey
15:10 EET	Gauračs 21'; Mohamed 61'; Labukas 83'	Report

15 February 2013	Győri ETO (Hungary)	2 – 2	(Bulgaria) Cherno More	Side, Turkey
17:30 EET	Nicorec 67'; Kronaveter 81'	Report	T. Kolev 32', 35'

23 February 2013	Cherno More	0 – 0	Neftochimic	Varna
15:00 EET		Report		Stadium: Ticha; Referee: Dragomir Draganov

22 March 2013	Cherno More	0 – 0	Svetkavitsa	Varna
15:00 EET		Report		Stadium: Ticha; Referee: Ivan Kirilov

=== A PFG ===
11 August 2012 1	Cherno More	0 – 3	Ludogorets	Varna
18:00 EEST	R. Kolev (yellow card) 18'; Palomino (yellow card) 34' (yellow-red card) 55'; Popov (yellow card) 35'	Report	Barthe 60'; Gargorov 72', 86'; Caiçara (yellow card) 20'; Genchev (yellow card) 28'; Stoyanov (yellow card) 36'; Ivanov (yellow card) 76'	Stadium: Ticha; Attendance: 6,400; Referee: Georgi Kabakov

18 August 2012 2	Etar	0 – 1	Cherno More	Veliko Tarnovo
18:00 EEST	Makendzhiev (yellow card) 60'; Nerylon (yellow card) 86'	Report	Edenilson 39'; Kapitanov (yellow card) 35'; Dechev (yellow card) 45'	Stadium: Ivaylo; Attendance: 4,800; Referee: Kalin Lyudmilov

25 August 2012 3	Cherno More	0 – 0	Slavia	Varna
18:00 EEST	Dimitrov (yellow card) 78'; Dechev (yellow card) 84'	Report	R. Dimitrov (yellow card) 73'; Yankov (yellow card) 80'; Petkov (yellow card) 87'	Stadium: Ticha; Attendance: 2,500; Referee: Ahmed Ahmed

31 August 2012 4	Levski	4 – 0	Cherno More	Sofia
20:00 EEST	Cristovão 6' de Carvalho 11', 64'; Marcinho 44'; Procházka (yellow card) 29'; Starokin (yellow card) 58'; Elie (yellow card) 84'	Report	Dechev (yellow card) 25'; Dimitrov (yellow card) 62'	Stadium: Georgi Asparuhov; Attendance: 6,580; Referee: Nikola Popov

15 September 2012 5	Cherno More	0 – 0	Botev Plovdiv	Varna
17:00 EEST	Camazzola (yellow card) 29'; Popov (yellow card) 83'; Kitanov (yellow card) 85'	Report	Rahov (yellow card) 5'; Grnčarov (yellow card) 53'	Stadium: Ticha; Attendance: 3,670; Referee: Georgi Yordanov

23 September 2012 6	Montana	3 – 1	Cherno More	Montana
17:00 EEST	Kovachev 51'; Vodenicharov 73'; Hristov 75'; Vodenicharov (yellow card) 66'; Iliev (yellow card) 80'	Report	G. Iliev 87'; Manolov (red card) 24'; Popov (yellow card) 40'; Yanev (yellow card) 54'	Stadium: Ogosta; Attendance: 2,000; Referee: Ivaylo Stoyanov

30 September 2012 7	Cherno More	1 – 1	Chernomorets Burgas	Varna
17:00 EEST	G. Iliev 80'; A. Aleksandrov (yellow card) 44'; R. Kolev (yellow card) 55'	Report	Nikolov 54' (pen.); Hristov (yellow card) 55'; N’Lundulu (red card) 58'; Yordanov (yellow card) 77'	Stadium: Ticha; Attendance: 2,670; Referee: Stanislav Yordanov

5 October 2012 8	Cherno More	2 – 1	Beroe	Varna
16:00 EEST	Bozhilov 45+1'; D. Atanasov 58'; S. Aleksandrov (yellow card) 19'	Report	Simeonov 50' (o.g.)	Stadium: Ticha; Attendance: 1,480; Referee: Tasko Taskov

21 October 2012 9	Pirin Gotse Delchev	3 – 2	Cherno More	Gotse Delchev
16:00 EEST	Hazurov 31' (pen.); Pirgov 54', 78'; Gutsev (yellow card) 48'; Hazurov (yellow card) 62'	Report	Manolov 49'; R. Kolev 60'; Kitanov (yellow card) 30'	Stadium: Gradski; Attendance: 2,050; Referee: Nikola Popov

27 October 2012 10	Cherno More	2 – 0	Lokomotiv Sofia	Varna
16:00 EEST	Palomino 21', 43'; Edenilson (yellow card) 33'; R. Kolev (yellow card) 37'; G. Iliev (yellow card) 51'	Report	Hristov (yellow card) 19'; Dimitrov (yellow card) 35'; Branekov (yellow card) 87'	Stadium: Ticha; Attendance: 1,450; Referee: Kalin Lyudmilov

4 November 2012 11	Litex	4 – 1	Cherno More	Lovech
17:30 EET	Isa 9', 30', 45+1'; Slavchev 29'; Bodurov (yellow card) 55'	Report	G. Iliev 70'; S. Aleksandrov (yellow card) 59'	Stadium: Lovech; Attendance: 550; Referee: Vihren Manev

10 November 2012 12	Cherno More	0 – 0	CSKA	Varna
12:30 EET	Camazzola (yellow card) 42'; S. Aleksandrov (yellow card) 62'	Report	Krachunov (yellow card) 22'; Priso (yellow card) 32'; Yanchev (yellow card) 54'	Stadium: Ticha; Attendance: 5,500; Referee: Georgi Yordanov

17 November 2012 13	Lokomotiv Plovdiv	1 – 0	Cherno More	Plovdiv
14:30 EET	Stefanov 15'; Zlatinski (yellow card) 68'; Kotev (yellow card) 82'; D. Georgiev (yellow card) 87'; Abushev (yellow card) 89'; Malamov (yellow card) 90+3'	Report	Manolov (yellow card) 37'; Bozhilov (yellow card) 40'	Stadium: Lokomotiv; Attendance: 1,830; Referee: Aleksandar Kostadinov

28 November 2012 14	Cherno More	2 – 0	Minyor Pernik	Varna
14:30 EET	D. Atanasov 57'; Edenilson 72'; Kapitanov (yellow card) 40'; A. Aleksandrov (yellow card) 90+2'	Report	Yurukov (yellow card) 11'; Cvetkov (yellow card) 20'; Pisarov (yellow card) 34'; Ivanov (yellow card) 36'; Mihov (yellow card) 63'	Stadium: Ticha; Attendance: 730; Referee: Ivaylo Stoyanov

9 December 2012 15	Botev Vratsa	1 – 0	Cherno More	Vratsa
14:00 EET	Iliev 86'; Atanasov (yellow card) 3'; Hristov (yellow card) 56'; Kuang (yellow card) 83'	Report	Dimitrov (yellow card) 9'; Camazzola (yellow card) 11'; Edenilson (yellow card) 75'; Bozhilov (yellow card) 82'	Stadium: Hristo Botev; Attendance: 500; Referee: Nikola Popov

3 March 2013 16	Ludogorets	2 – 0	Cherno More	Razgrad
18:00 EET	Marcelinho 48'; Bakalov 87'; Moți (yellow card) 54'; Stoyanov (yellow card) 66'	Report	Cristian (yellow card) 53'; R. Kolev (yellow card) 54'; Komel (yellow card) 55'	Stadium: Ludogorets Arena; Attendance: 3,610; Referee: Georgi Yordanov

9 March 2013 17	Cherno More	0 – 1	Etar	Varna
15:30 EET		Report	Mehmet 77'; Fey (yellow card) 32'; Yılmaz (yellow card) 38'; Castellana (yellow card) 62'	Stadium: Ticha; Attendance: 1,670; Referee: Hristo Ristoskov

16 March 2013 18	Slavia	1 – 0	Cherno More	Sofia
15:30 EET	Livramento 53'; Ivanov (yellow card) 75'	Report	T. Kolev (yellow card) 41'; G. Iliev (yellow card) 60'	Stadium: Ovcha Kupel; Attendance: 350; Referee: Kalin Lyudmilov

30 March 2013 19	Cherno More	1 – 1	Levski	Varna
15:00 EET	Bozhilov 9'; Manolov (yellow card) 5'; R. Kolev (yellow card) 13'; S. Aleksandrov (yellow card) 18'; Camazzola (yellow card) 51'; Komel (yellow card) 60'	Report	Mihelič 12'; Dimov (yellow card) 28'; Mihelič (yellow card) 29'; Mulder (yellow card) 57'	Stadium: Ticha; Attendance: 6,500; Referee: Ivaylo Stoyanov

6 April 2013 20	Botev Plovdiv	3 – 1	Cherno More	Plovdiv
17:00 EEST	Nedelev 19'; Ognyanov 35'; Pedro 80'; Pereira (yellow card) 49'; Minev (yellow card) 52'; Jirsák (yellow card) 90'	Report	Raykov 55'; Simeonov (yellow card) 42'	Stadium: Hristo Botev; Attendance: 0 Referee: Stefan Spasov

10 April 2013 21	Cherno More	2 – 1	Montana	Varna
17:00 EEST	Edenilson 5'; G. Iliev 39'; Bozhilov (yellow card) 86'	Report	Mladenov 24'; Mladenov (yellow card) 84'	Stadium: Ticha; Attendance: 1,300; Referee: Stanislav Stavrov

14 April 2013 22	Chernomorets Burgas	3 – 3	Cherno More	Burgas
19:00 EEST	Baltanov 8' (pen.), 67'; Arnaud 66'; Tsonkov (yellow card) 40'	Report	R. Kolev 26'; Cristian 63'; Bozhilov 90'; S. Aleksandrov (yellow card) 8'; R. Kolev (yellow card) 62'; Kapitanov (yellow card) 87'	Stadium: Lazur; Attendance: 720; Referee: Nikolay Yordanov

20 April 2013 23	Beroe	1 – 0	Cherno More	Stara Zagora
19:00 EEST	Andonov 3'; Stoychev (yellow card) 45'; Sayoud (yellow card) 65'	Report	Edenilson (yellow card) 49'; Cristian (yellow card) 63'; Stalev (yellow card) 76'	Stadium: Beroe; Attendance: 2,540; Referee: Tasko Taskov

28 April 2013 24	Cherno More	5 – 1	Pirin Gotse Delchev	Varna
17:00 EEST	Bozhilov 17'; G. Iliev 39'; Inkango 70'; Raykov 74'; Kapitanov 85'; S. Aleksandrov (yellow card) 33'	Report	Petrov 88'; Abdikov (red card) 29'	Stadium: Ticha; Attendance: 810; Referee: Dimitar Andreev

2 May 2013 25	Lokomotiv Sofia	0 – 0	Cherno More	Sofia
15:30 EEST	Branekov (yellow card) 83'	Report	Komel (yellow card) 27'; R. Kolev (yellow card) 33'; Kitanov (yellow card) 90+4'	Stadium: Lokomotiv; Attendance: 510; Referee: Vihren Manev

8 May 2013 26	Cherno More	1 – 0	Litex	Varna
15:00 EEST	G. Iliev 44'; Kitanov (yellow card) 90'	Report	I. Milanov (yellow card) 90+1'	Stadium: Ticha; Attendance: 1,100; Referee: Tasko Taskov

11 May 2013 27	CSKA	3 – 2	Cherno More	Sofia
20:00 EEST	Vasilev 32'; A. Aleksandrov 54' (o.g.); Serginho 78'; Lucas Sasha (yellow card) 60'	Report	Inkango 7'; Bandalovski 38' (o.g.); R. Kolev (yellow card) 56'; Komel (yellow card) 90+3'	Stadium: Balgarska Armiya; Attendance: 440; Referee: Hristo Ristoskov

18 May 2013 28	Cherno More	3 – 0	Lokomotiv Plovdiv	Varna
18:00 EEST	Edenilson 8'; Inkango 39'; G. Iliev 90+2'; Camazzola (yellow card) 70'; G. Iliev (yellow card) 90+2'	Report	V. Georgiev (yellow card) 85'	Stadium: Ticha; Attendance: 2,850; Referee: Dimitar Andreev

22 May 2013 29	Minyor Pernik	0 – 2	Cherno More	Pernik
18:00 EEST	Sofroniev (yellow card) 25'; Hikmet (yellow card) 28'; Olegov (yellow card) 42'	Report	Edenilson 55'; Inkango 89'	Stadium: Minyor; Attendance: 290; Referee: Stanislav Todorov

25 May 2013 30	Cherno More	1 – 1	Botev Vratsa	Varna
18:00 EEST	Bozhilov 10'; S. Aleksandrov (yellow card) 45+1'; Kitanov (yellow card) 61'	Report	Iliev 63'; Iliev (yellow card) 59'	Stadium: Ticha; Attendance: 1,080; Referee: Tasko Taskov

==== League table ====
Pos	Team	Pld	W	D	L	GF	GA	GD	Pts
8	Slavia Sofia	30	12	6	12	39	35	+4	42
9	Lokomotiv Plovdiv	30	10	9	11	37	34	+3	39
10	Cherno More	30	9	8	13	33	39	−6	35
11	Pirin Gotse Delchev	30	10	4	16	27	57	−30	34
12	Lokomotiv Sofia	30	7	10	13	27	38	−11	31 (Note: Lokomotiv Sofia ahead of Botev Vratsa on head-to-head record; Lokomotiv Sofia–Botev Vratsa 3–0, Botev Vratsa–Lokomotiv Sofia 0–0.)

Source: A PFG (in Bulgarian)
Rules for classification: 1st points; 2nd head-to-head points; 3rd head-to-head goal difference; 4th head-to-head goals scored; 5th head-to-head away goals scored; 6th goal difference; 7th goals scored

==== Results summary ====
Overall								Home						Away					
Pld	W	D	L	GF	GA	GD	Pts	W	D	L	GF	GA	GD	W	D	L	GF	GA	GD
30	9	8	13	33	39	−6	35	7	6	2	20	10	+10	2	2	11	13	29	−16

Last updated: 26 May 2013.
Source: bulgarian-football.com

==== League performance ====
Round	1	2	3	4	5	6	7	8	9	10	11	12	13	14	15	16	17	18	19	20	21	22	23	24	25	26	27	28	29	30
Ground	H	A	H	A	H	A	H	H	A	H	A	H	A	H	A	A	H	A	H	A	H	A	A	H	A	H	A	H	A	H
Result	L	W	D	L	D	L	D	W	L	W	L	D	L	W	L	L	L	L	D	L	W	D	L	W	D	W	L	W	W	D
Position	15	6	9	11	11	13	13	10	13	9	10	11	11	10	10	11	12	12	12	13	13	12	12	11	11	10	11	10	10	10

Source: bulgarian-football.com
A = Away; H = Home; W = Win; D = Draw; L = Loss

=== Bulgarian Cup ===
31 October 2012 2nd Round/1st Leg	Strumska Slava	0 – 0	Cherno More	Radomir
15:00 EET		Report	Kapitanov (yellow card) 30'	Stadium: Gradski; Attendance: 300; Referee: Angel Bayaltsaliev

24 November 2012 2nd Round/2nd Leg	Cherno More	2 – 0 (2 – 0 agg.)	Strumska Slava	Varna
13:00 EET	Kapitanov 15'; A. Iliev 82'	Report	Raychev (red card) 7'; Ashimov (yellow card) 72'; Mitov (yellow card)	Stadium: Ticha; Attendance: 300; Referee: Georgi Davidov

2 December 2012 3rd Round/1st Leg	Levski Sofia	4 – 0	Cherno More	Sofia
15:45 EET	Mulder 11', 51'; Silva 54', 75' (pen.); Ramos (yellow card) 65'; Mulder (yellow card) 77'	Report	Camazzola (yellow card) 23'; Edenilson (yellow card) 37'; Manolov (yellow card) 72'; S. Aleksandrov (red card) 74'; Simeonov (yellow card) 83'	Stadium: Georgi Asparuhov; Attendance: 1,150; Referee: Stefan Spasov

15 December 2012 3rd Round/2nd Leg	Cherno More	1 – 0 (1 – 4 agg.)	Levski Sofia	Varna
13:00 EET	R. Kolev 69'; Dimitrov (yellow card) 28'; Manolov (yellow card) 58'	Report	Dimov (yellow card) 8' (yellow-red card) 68'; Pinto (yellow card) 34'	Stadium: Ticha; Attendance: 2,090; Referee: Georgi Kabakov

== Squad statistics ==
Key:
‡ On loan from another club * First appearance(s) for the club

- # = Squad number
- Pos = Playing position
- P = Number of games played 10
- G = Number of goals scored
- GK = Goalkeeper
- DF = Defender
- MF = Midfielder
- FW = Forward
- = Yellow cards
- = Red cards
- † Permanent player left club during the season
- ¤ Loaned to another club for part or all of season

Correct as of 26 May 2013. Starting appearances are listed first, followed by substitute appearances in parentheses where applicable.

No.	Pos	Name	P	G	P	G	P	G	A yellow card	A red card	Notes
No.	Pos	Name	League		Bulgarian Cup		Total		Discipline		Notes
1	GK	(Bulgaria) Petar Denchev †	0	0	0	0	0	0	0	0	
1	GK	(Bulgaria) Emil Mihaylov	1	0	0	0	1	0	0	0	
3	DF	(Bulgaria) Rosen Kolev	25	2	4	1	29	3	8	0	
4	DF	(Bulgaria) Detelin Dimitrov	13	0	3	0	15	0	4	0	
5	MF	(Brazil) Samuel Camazzola	16(3)	0	1	0	17(3)	0	6	0	
6	MF	(Brazil) Edenilson Bergonsi	23(1)	5	4	0	27(1)	5	4	0	
7	MF	(Bulgaria) Bekir Rasim	0	0	0(2)	0	0(2)	0	0	0	
8	MF	(Bulgaria) Kosta Yanev †	0	0	0	0	0	0	0	0	
9	FW	(Venezuela) Hermes Palomino	6(12)	2	0(1)	0	6(13)	2	2	1	
10	FW	(Bulgaria) Miroslav Manolov	21(4)	1	4	0	25(4)	1	4	1	
11	MF	(Bulgaria) Doncho Atanasov †	9(3)	2	3	0	12(3)	2	0	0	
11	MF	(Bulgaria) Simeon Raykov	13(1)	2	0	0	13(1)	2	0	0	
12	DF	(Bulgaria) Martin Dechev †	8	0	2(1)	0	10(1)	0	3	0	
13	MF	(Bulgaria) Todor Kolev	2(3)	0	0	0	2(3)	0	1	0	
14	FW	(Bulgaria) Georgi Bozhilov	22(5)	5	2(1)	0	26(4)	5	3	0	
15	DF	(Bulgaria) Aleksandar Aleksandrov	30	0	2	0	32	0	2	0	
18	DF	(Bulgaria) Ivelin Yanev †	2(1)	0	1	0	3(1)	0	1	0	
18	DF	(Slovenia) Sebastjan Komel	10(1)	0	0	0	10(1)	0	4	0	
19	MF	(Bulgaria) Hristian Popov †	2(5)	0	0(2)	0	2(7)	0	3	0	
19	FW	(France) Bruce Inkango	6(4)	4	0	0	6(4)	4	0	0	
20	MF	(Bulgaria) Stamen Angelov †	0(8)	0	1	0	1(8)	0	0	0	
21	MF	(Bulgaria) Georgi Iliev (c)	29	7	2	0	31	7	3	0	
22	GK	(Bulgaria) Plamen Kolev †	1	0	3(1)	0	4(1)	0	0	0	
23	MF	(Bulgaria) Simeon Simeonov	5(10)	0	4	0	9(10)	0	2	0	
24	DF	(Bulgaria) Slavi Stalev	1(2)	0	0	0	1(2)	0	1	0	
25	DF	(Bulgaria) Sasho Aleksandrov	26	0	1	0	27	0	7	1	
26	DF	(Bulgaria) Georgi Radev	0	0	0	0	0	0	0	0	
30	FW	(Bulgaria) Ilian Kapitanov	6(10)	1	3	1	9(10)	2	4	0	
33	GK	(Bulgaria) Georgi Kitanov	28	0	1	0	29	0	5	0	
37	GK	(Bulgaria) Stoyan Stavrev †	0	0	0	0	0	0	0	0	
37	GK	(Bulgaria) Georgi Stavrev	0	0	0	0	0	0	0	0	
77	MF	(Bulgaria) Viktor Mitev ¤ †	0	0	0	0	0	0	0	0	
83	MF	(Spain) Cristian Hidalgo	12(2)	1	0	0	12(2)	1	2	0	
86	MF	(Venezuela) Marlon Fernández ‡	0(1)	0	0	0	0(1)	0	0	0	
91	DF	(Bulgaria) Zhivko Atanasov	12(6)	0	3	0	15(6)	0	0	0	
99	FW	(Bulgaria) Atanas Iliev	0(4)	0	0(3)	1	0(7)	1	0	0	

=== Start formations ===
Accounts for all competitions. Numbers constitute according game of the competition in which the formation was used, NOT number of occurrences.

Qnt	Formation	Match(es)
32	4–2–3–1	All other matches
2	4–4–2 diamond	5, 6 A PFG

Last updated: 26 May 2013
Source: Match reports in Competitions
Only competitive matches.

== Club ==
=== Coaching staff ===
Position	Staff
Manager	(Bulgaria) Stefan Genov (until 24 September), (Bulgaria) Adalbert Zafirov (26 September-17 December), then (Bulgaria) Georgi Ivanov
Assistant First Team Coach	(Bulgaria) Ivaylo Petrov (from 17 December)
Assistant First Team Coach	(Bulgaria) Emanuil Lukanov
Goalkeeper Coach	(Bulgaria) Stoyan Stavrev
First Team Fitness Coach	(Bulgaria) Veselin Markov
Individual Team Fitness Coach	(Bulgaria) Viktor Bumbalov
Medical Director	(Bulgaria) Dr. Petko Atev
Academy Manager	(Bulgaria) Hristina Dimitrova

Last updated: 17 December 2012
Source: Cherno More

=== Other information ===
Owner/Chairman	(Bulgaria) Marin Mitev
Chief Executive	(Bulgaria) Marin Marinov
Sporting Director	(Bulgaria) Todor Velikov
Ground (capacity and dimensions)	Ticha Stadium (12,500 / 103x67 metres)

Updated to match played 1 August 2012
Source: Cherno More
