= 2011–12 PFC Cherno More Varna season =

Cherno More
2011–12 season
- Chairman: Marin Mitev
- Manager: Stefan Genov
- A PFG: 7th
- Bulgarian Cup: 2nd Round (1/16) (knocked out by Minyor Pernik)
- Top goalscorer: League: Georgi Iliev (10); All: Georgi Iliev (10)
- Highest home attendance: 8,780 vs Levski Sofia (13 August 2011)
- Lowest home attendance: 500 vs Slavia (23 May 2012)
- Average home league attendance: 2,201

This page covers all relevant details regarding PFC Cherno More Varna for all official competitions inside the 2011–12 season. These are A PFG and Bulgarian Cup.

== Transfers ==
=== In ===
Date	Pos.	Name	From	Fee
5 July 2011	DF	(Bulgaria) Tsvetan Yotov	Spartak Plovdiv	Free
5 July 2011	MF	(Bulgaria) Hristian Popov	Sliven	Free
5 July 2011	MF	(Bulgaria) Simeon Simeonov	Dobrudzha	Free
5 July 2011	MF	(Bulgaria) Veselin Marchev	Sliven	Free
6 July 2011	DF	(Bulgaria) Ivelin Yanev	Etar	Free
6 July 2011	FW	(Venezuela) Hermes Palomino	(Venezuela) Aragua	Free
27 December 2011	GK	(Bulgaria) Plamen Kolev	Vidima-Rakovski	Free
16 February 2012	DF	(Bulgaria) Zhivko Atanasov	Levski Sofia	Free

=== Out ===
Date	Pos.	Name	To	Fee
1 June 2011	FW	(Bulgaria) Miroslav Budinov	Sportist Svoge	Free
1 June 2011	FW	(Bulgaria) Vladimir Kaptiev	Botev Kozloduy	Free
1 June 2011	DF	(Bulgaria) Radoslav Bachev	Montana	Free
1 June 2011	MF	(Bulgaria) Daniel Georgiev	(Turkey) Orduspor	Free
1 June 2011	DF	(Bulgaria) Tanko Dyakov	Lokomotiv Sofia	Free
1 June 2011	DF	(Brazil) Ademar Júnior	CSKA Sofia	Free
5 July 2011	DF	(Brazil) Marco Tiago	(Portugal) Portimonense	Free
2 August 2011	FW	(Bulgaria) Vasil Tachev	Dobrudzha	Free
24 November 2011	MF	(Estonia) Daniil Ratnikov	(Estonia) Tallinna Kalev	Free
30 November 2011	MF	(Bulgaria) Veselin Marchev	(Poland) Flota Świnoujście	Free
30 November 2011	MF	(Bulgaria) Todor Kolev	Vidima-Rakovski	Free
30 November 2011	MF	(Bulgaria) Dimitar Petkov	Bdin	Free
7 December 2011	GK	(Bulgaria) Ilko Pirgov	Litex	€50,000
12 January 2012	MF	(Bulgaria) Stanislav Stoyanov	Retired	N/A
28 February 2012	MF	(Bulgaria) Lyubomir Mihalev	Dobrudzha	Free

=== Loans in ===
Date	Pos.	Name	From	End date	Fee
3 January 2012	MF	(Venezuela) Marlon Fernández	(Venezuela) Deportivo Lara	End of season	Free

=== Loans out ===
Date	Pos.	Name	To	End date	Fee
29 July 2011	MF	(Bulgaria) Lyubomir Mihalev	Dobrudzha	31 December 2011	Free

== Squad information ==
N	Pos.	Nat.	Name	Age	EU	Since	App	Goals	Ends	Transfer fee	Notes
1	GK	(Bulgaria)	Petar Denchev	23	EU	2010	18	0	2013	Free	
3	CB	(Bulgaria)	Tsvetan Yotov	22	EU	2011	1	0	2014	Free	
5	DM	(Brazil)	Samuel Camazzola	29	EU	2011	42	2	2012	Free	
7	DM	(Bulgaria)	Stanislav Stoyanov	35	EU	1999	240	10	2011	Free	(Note: Stoyanov retired in January 2012.)
7	AM	(Bulgaria)	Bekir Rasim	17	EU	2012	1	0		Youth system	
8	LW	(Bulgaria)	Doncho Atanasov	29	EU	2010	46	6	2012	Free	
9	FW	(Venezuela)	Hermes Palomino	24	Non-EU	2011	17	4	2013	Free	
10	FW	(Bulgaria)	Miroslav Manolov	27	EU	2007	94	31	2014	Free	
11	LW	(Bulgaria)	Todor Kolev	22	EU	2006	46	5	2012	Youth system	(Note: Player left the club in November 2011.)
11	FW	(Bulgaria)	Atanas Iliev	17	EU	2012	2	1		Youth system	
12	GK	(Bulgaria)	Nikolay Kirchev	20	EU	2011	0	0	2013	Youth system	
14	FW	(Bulgaria)	Georgi Bozhilov	25	EU	2010	65	10	2013	€100,000	
15	CB	(Bulgaria)	Aleksandar Aleksandrov	26	EU	2005	171	5	2013	€30,000	
16	DM	(Bulgaria)	Dimitar Petkov	24	EU	2010	31	1	2012	Free	
17	RB	(Bulgaria)	Yancho Andreev	21	EU	2009	11	1	2012	Youth system	
18	LB	(Bulgaria)	Ivelin Yanev	30	EU	2011	25	0	2013	Free	
19	DM	(Bulgaria)	Hristian Popov	22	EU	2011	15	1	2014	Free	
20	RB	(Bulgaria)	Mihail Lazarov	31	EU	2007	57	3	2012	Free	
21	CM	(Bulgaria)	Georgi Iliev (captain)	30	EU	2008	162	39	2014	€100,000	(Note: Iliev made 72 appearances and scored 13 goals during his first spell at the club between 2000 and 2003.)
22	GK	(Bulgaria)	Plamen Kolev	24	EU	2012	4	0	2014	Free	
23	CM	(Bulgaria)	Simeon Simeonov	28	EU	2011	15	0	2013	Free	
24	RW	(Bulgaria)	Veselin Marchev	21	EU	2011	8	0	2014	Free	
24	CB	(Bulgaria)	Slavi Stalev	18	EU	2012	1	0		Youth system	
25	RB	(Bulgaria)	Sasho Aleksandrov	25	EU	2010	62	2	2012	€30,000	
26	GK	(Bulgaria)	Ilko Pirgov	25	EU	2009	76	0	2013	Free	(Note: Player left the club in December 2011.)
27	AM	(Estonia)	Daniil Ratnikov	23	EU	2010	26	3	2012	Free	
30	RW	(Bulgaria)	Ilian Kapitanov	19	EU	2010	19	4	2013	Youth system	
33	GK	(Bulgaria)	Georgi Kitanov	17	EU	2012	2	0		Youth system	
55	CB	(Bulgaria)	Rosen Kolev	21	EU	2011	29	2	2014	Free	
77	LW	(Bulgaria)	Viktor Mitev	19	EU	2011	6	0	2013	Youth system	
86	AM	(Venezuela)	Marlon Fernández	26	Non-EU	2012	10	1	2012	Free	
90	FW	(Bulgaria)	Rumen Nikolov	22	EU	2010	45	8	2012	Youth system	
91	CB	(Bulgaria)	Zhivko Atanasov	21	EU	2012	15	1	2014	Free	

- Last updated: May 31, 2012

== Competitions ==
=== Pre-season and Friendlies ===
1 July 2011	Dacia Chişinău (Moldova)	2 – 2	(Bulgaria) Cherno More	Chişinău, Moldova
20:00 EEST	Orbu 51' (pen.), 61'	Report	Bozhilov 9'; Palomino 86'	Stadium: Zimbru; Attendance: 4,000

3 July 2011	Zimbru Chişinău (Moldova)	0 – 0	(Bulgaria) Cherno More	Chişinău, Moldova
20:00 EEST		Report		Stadium: Zimbru; Attendance: 2,000

7 July 2011	Kaliakra	0 – 1	Cherno More	Kavarna
18:00 EEST		Report	Iliev 15'	Stadium: Kavarna; Referee: Ivelin Donev

9 July 2011	Cherno More	1 – 0	Dorostol	Varna
18:00 EEST	Andonov 34' (o.g.)	Report		Stadium: Ticha

13 July 2011	Lokomotiv Plovdiv	2 – 3	Cherno More	Bansko
18:00 EEST	de Carvalho 47', 90'	Report	Palomino 41', 45'; Iliev 51'	Stadium: Piry Complex; Attendance: 100; Referee: Ivaylo Stoyanov

15 July 2011	Bansko	0 – 1	Cherno More	Bansko
16:45 EEST		Report	Petkov 22'	Stadium: Piry Complex

18 July 2011	Slavia	1 – 0	Cherno More	Bansko
18:30 EEST	Ivanov 80'	Report		Stadium: Piry Complex

20 July 2011	Septemvri Simitli	0 – 2	Cherno More	Simitli
10:30 EEST		Report	Nikolov 42'; Manolov 88'	Stadium: Struma; Referee: Stefan Apostolov

23 July 2011	Cherno More	0 – 2	Svetkavitsa	Varna
18:30 EEST		Report	Shokolarov 39', 60'	Stadium: Ticha

27 July 2011	Chernomorets Burgas	2 – 2	Cherno More	Burgas
19:00 EEST	Aka 8'; Hristov 63'	Report	Palomino 36'; Ratnikov 81'	Stadium: Lazur; Attendance: 500

3 September 2011	Astra Ploieşti (Romania)	0 – 0	(Bulgaria) Cherno More	Ploieşti, Romania
21:00 EEST		Report		Stadium: Astra

7 October 2011	Cherno More	4 – 1	Etar	Varna
16:00 EEST	Petkov 15'; Palomino 20'; Simeonov 38'; Nikolov 68'	Report	A. Mladenov 55'	Stadium: Ticha; Referee: Ivan Kirilov

11 October 2011	Dobrudzha	0 – 3	Cherno More	Dobrich
16:00 EEST		Report	Dimitrov 6' (o.g.); Palomino 16'; T. Kolev 85'	Stadium: Druzhba

25 January 2012	Cherno More	1 – 0	Neftohimic	Varna
14:00 EET	D. Pirgov 54'	Report		Stadium: Mladost; Referee: Radan Miryanov

4 February 2012	Sportul Studențesc (Romania)	2 – 0	(Bulgaria) Cherno More	Alanya, Turkey
15:00 EET	36' (pen.); 60' (pen.)	Report

7 February 2012	Jagiellonia Białystok (Poland)	4 – 0	(Bulgaria) Cherno More	Side, Turkey
15:30 EET	Frankowski 1'; Rasiak 22', 39'; Kupisz 24'	Report

9 February 2012	Gomel (Belarus)	2 – 2	(Bulgaria) Cherno More	Alanya, Turkey
15:00 EET	Kashewski 8'; Sheryakov 58'	Report	R. Kolev 38'; Iliev 86'

12 February 2012	Horizont Turnovo (North Macedonia)	0 – 0	(Bulgaria) Cherno More	Antalya, Turkey
15:30 EET		Report

18 February 2012	Cherno More	4 – 1	Nesebar	Varna
14:00 EET	Palomino 43', 55'; Manolov 49', 85'	Report	Ivanov 75'	Stadium: Mladost

21 February 2012	Cherno More	1 – 0	Kaliakra	Varna
14:00 EET	R. Kolev 55'	Report		Stadium: Mladost

24 February 2012	Chernomorets Burgas	1 – 1	Cherno More	Burgas
14:00 EET	Yordanov 72'	Report	Kapitanov 36'	Stadium: Sharks' Nest

=== A PFG ===
6 August 2011 1	Cherno More	2 – 0	Montana	Varna
18:00 EEST	Bozhilov 53'; Camazzola 72'; R. Kolev (yellow card) 44'; Camazzola (yellow card) 59'	Report	Kondev (yellow card) 39'; D. Iliev (yellow card) 47'; Todorov (yellow card) 78'; Luiz Eduardo (yellow card) 88'	Stadium: Ticha; Attendance: 2,730; Referee: Nikola Popov

13 August 2011 2	Cherno More	3 – 1	Levski	Varna
18:00 EEST	Kapitanov 36'; Palomino 52'; Petkov 90+3'; Yanev (yellow card) 47'	Report	Tsvetkov 70'; Ivanov (yellow card) 22'; Bashliev (yellow card) 63'; Yovov (yellow card) 74'	Stadium: Ticha; Attendance: 8,780; Referee: Tasko Taskov

20 August 2011 3	Botev Vratsa	0 – 1	Cherno More	Vratsa
18:00 EEST	Chalakov (yellow card) 45+1'; Neném (yellow card) 72'; Alyoshev (yellow card) 90+3'	Report	Nikolov 85'; D. Atanasov (yellow card) 40'; G. Iliev (yellow card) 76'; Yanev (yellow card) 90'; S. Aleksandrov (yellow card) 90+3'; Manolov (yellow card) 90+4'	Stadium: Hristo Botev; Attendance: 4,200; Referee: Ivaylo Stoyanov

27 August 2011 4	Cherno More	2 – 0	Minyor	Varna
18:00 EEST	G. Iliev 35'; Kapitanov 37'; G. Iliev (yellow card) 49'; Yanev (yellow card) 76'; R. Kolev (yellow card) 86'	Report	Brahimi (yellow card) 49'; Stoychev (yellow card) 49'; Vasilev (yellow card) 63'	Stadium: Ticha; Attendance: 1,730; Referee: Ahmed Ahmed

10 September 2011 5	Litex	1 – 0	Cherno More	Lovech
20:00 EEST	Bodurov 45+2'; G. Milanov (yellow card) 70'	Report	Yanev (yellow card) 26'; S. Aleksandrov (yellow card) 60'; Pirgov (yellow card) 72'; R. Kolev (yellow card) 84'	Stadium: Lovech; Attendance: 610; Referee: Aleksandar Kostadinov

18 September 2011 6	Cherno More	0 – 1	Ludogorets	Varna
16:30 EEST	R. Kolev (yellow card) 33'; A. Aleksandrov (yellow card) 40'; S. Aleksandrov (yellow card) 81'; Manolov (yellow card) 90+4'	Report	Aleksandrov 72'; Dyakov (yellow card) 45'; Barthe (yellow card) 59'; Ivanov (yellow card) 80'; Golubović (yellow card) 90+4'	Stadium: Ticha; Attendance: 3,900; Referee: Georgi Kabakov

24 September 2011 7	Loko Sofia	0 – 0	Cherno More	Sofia
20:00 EEST	Lahchev (yellow card) 44'	Report	D. Atanasov (yellow card) 45+1'; R. Kolev (red card)	Stadium: Vasil Levski National Stadium; Attendance: 200; Referee: Stefan Spasov

1 October 2011 8	Cherno More	0 – 2	Chernomorets	Varna
16:00 EEST	Manolov (yellow card) 24'; Camazzola (yellow card) 44'; Yotov (yellow card) 70'; S. Aleksandrov (yellow card) 75'; Marchev (yellow card) 81'	Report	Andonov 33'; Assis 72'; Hamroun (yellow card) 50'; Tsonkov (yellow card) 63'	Stadium: Ticha; Attendance: 1,640; Referee: Ivaylo Stoyanov

18 October 2011 9	Kaliakra	0 – 5	Cherno More	Kavarna
18:00 EEST		Report	G. Iliev 21', 88'; Bozhilov 29'; S. Aleksandrov 69'; Palomino 77'	Stadium: Kavarna; Attendance: 260; Referee: Georgi Yordanov

21 October 2011 10	Cherno More	0 – 0	CSKA	Varna
16:00 EEST	Camazzola (yellow card) 80'; S. Aleksandrov (red card) 88'	Report	Nelson (yellow card) 36'; Moraes (yellow card) 52'; K. Stoyanov (yellow card) 55'; Krachunov (yellow card) 58'; M'Bolhi (yellow card) 88'	Stadium: Ticha; Attendance: 4,640; Referee: Ahmed Ahmed

27 October 2011 11	Loko Plovdiv	1 – 0	Cherno More	Plovdiv
14:30 EEST	Venkov 71'; Todorov (yellow card) 63'; V. Georgiev (yellow card) 70' (yellow-red card) 87'	Report	Andreev (yellow card) 24' (yellow-red card) 63'; D. Atanasov (yellow card) 47'; Camazzola (yellow card) 83'	Stadium: Lokomotiv; Attendance: 2,000; Referee: Nikola Popov

5 November 2011 12	Cherno More	2 – 0	Beroe	Varna
14:30 EET	Manolov 1'; D. Atanasov 11'; R. Kolev (yellow card) 65'	Report	Angelov (yellow card) 24'; Džaferović (yellow card) 55'; Valkanov (yellow card) 76'	Stadium: Ticha; Attendance: 1,500; Referee: Kalin Lyudmilov

11 November 2011 13	Vidima-Rakovski	0 – 0	Cherno More	Sevlievo
14:30 EET	R. Ivanov (yellow card) 73'; P. Kozhuharov (yellow card) 75'; Stoykov (yellow card) 77'; Kakalov (yellow card) 88'	Report	Manolov (yellow card) 18'; Bozhilov (yellow card) 30'; S. Aleksandrov (yellow card) 55'; Camazzola (yellow card) 77'	Stadium: Rakovski; Attendance: 270; Referee: Nikolay Yordanov

19 November 2011 14	Cherno More	1 – 0	Svetkavitsa	Varna
14:30 EET	G. Iliev 26'; Petkov (yellow card) 24'; Manolov (yellow card) 67'; T. Kolev (yellow card) 90'	Report	Marinov (yellow card) 71'	Stadium: Ticha; Attendance: 1,000; Referee: Georgi Kabakov

28 November 2011 15	Slavia	1 – 1	Cherno More	Sofia
14:30 EET	Juninho 56' (pen.); Iliev (yellow card) 44'	Report	Palomino 36'; Bozhilov (yellow card) 42'; G. Iliev (yellow card) 43'; A. Aleksandrov (red card) 55'; R. Kolev (yellow card) 65' (yellow-red card) 80'; Popov (yellow card) 68'	Stadium: Ovcha Kupel; Attendance: 150; Referee: Tasko Taskov

4 March 2012 17	Levski	2 – 1	Cherno More	Sofia
13:30 EET	Tsvetkov 43'; Cristovão 75'; Pinto (yellow card) 60'; Dimov (yellow card) 63'; Gadzhev (yellow card) 79'; Mulder (yellow card) 82'	Report	D. Atanasov 85'; D. Atanasov (yellow card) 66'; G. Iliev (yellow card) 71'	Stadium: Georgi Asparuhov; Attendance: 6,820; Referee: Stefan Spasov

12 March 2012 18	Cherno More	1 – 0	Botev Vratsa	Varna
15:30 EET	G. Iliev 69'; R. Kolev (yellow card) 32'; S. Aleksandrov (yellow card) 88'	Report	Kokonov (yellow card) 39'; Naydenov (yellow card) 56'; Savić (yellow card) 72'; Chalakov (yellow card) 83'	Stadium: Ticha; Attendance: 860; Referee: Stoyan Denev

17 March 2012 19	Minyor	0 – 1	Cherno More	Pernik
15:30 EET	Tom (yellow card) 43'; Okechukwu (yellow card) 67'; Markov (yellow card) 86'	Report	Fernández 4'; G. Iliev (yellow card) 52'; Manolov (yellow card) 65'	Stadium: Minyor; Attendance: 1,140; Referee: Georgi Yordanov

22 March 2012 16 (Note: The 16th round was postponed by the Bulgarian Football Union due to adverse weather conditions.)	Montana	1 – 3	Cherno More	Montana
15:30 EET	Eduardo 30'; Lichkov (red card) 8'; Dyulgerov (yellow card) 38'; Eduardo (yellow card) 45+1'; Borisov (yellow card) 69'	Report	Manolov 1', 40' (pen.), 68'; Yanev (yellow card) 24'; D. Atanasov (yellow card) 26'; Bozhilov (yellow card) 70'; Denchev (yellow card) 77'	Stadium: Ogosta; Attendance: 710; Referee: Stanislav Todorov

25 March 2012 20	Cherno More	0 – 1	Litex	Varna
15:30 EEST	Manolov (yellow card) 22'	Report	Yanev 55'; Tsvetkov (yellow card) 82'	Stadium: Ticha; Attendance: 2,640; Referee: Hristo Ristoskov

29 March 2012 21	Ludogorets	0 – 2	Cherno More	Razgrad
15:30 EEST	Kabasele (yellow card) 83'	Report	Palomino 18'; Manolov 58'; S. Aleksandrov (yellow card) 49'; Popov (yellow card) 90+1'	Stadium: Ludogorets Arena; Attendance: 3,270; Referee: Aleksandar Kostadinov

1 April 2012 22	Cherno More	3 – 0	Loko Sofia	Varna
15:30 EEST	Manolov 45'; Bozhilov 78'; G. Iliev 83'; Camazzola (yellow card) 59'; Z. Atanasov (yellow card) 90+2'	Report	Manchev (yellow card) 45+2'; Y. Petkov (yellow card) 57'; Dobrev (yellow card) 69'	Stadium: Ticha; Attendance: 720; Referee: Georgi Kabakov

8 April 2012 23	Chernomorets	3 – 2	Cherno More	Burgas
13:30 EEST	Assis 34'; Chahechouhe 53'; Dyakov 83'; Boli (yellow card) 13'; Tsonkov (yellow card) 84'	Report	Manolov 70'; Camazzola 86'; Manolov (yellow card) 43'; S. Aleksandrov (yellow card) 73'	Stadium: Lazur; Attendance: 1,940; Referee: Kalin Lyudmilov

18 April 2012 24	Cherno More	7 – 1	Kaliakra	Varna
17:00 EEST	Z. Atanasov 11'; G. Iliev 23' (pen.), 67', 88'; A. Aleksandrov 30'; Nikolov 56'; Madzhirov 75' (o.g.)	Report	Tsachev 90'; T. Dimitrov (yellow card) 23'; Kovachev (yellow card) 29'	Stadium: Ticha; Attendance: 540; Referee: Georgi Yordanov

22 April 2012 25	CSKA	4 – 1	Cherno More	Sofia
13:30 EEST	Galchev 5'; Moraes 25', 41' (pen.); Popov 79' (o.g.); Trifonov (yellow card) 44'	Report	G. Iliev 30' (pen.); Camazzola (yellow card) 73'	Stadium: Balgarska Armiya; Attendance: 8,660; Referee: Hristo Ristoskov

28 April 2012 26	Cherno More	1 – 2	Loko Plovdiv	Varna
15:30 EEST	Popov 55'; Simeonov (yellow card) 6'; S. Aleksandrov (yellow card) 45+2'	Report	Lazarov 73'; Dakson 80'; Karadzhov (yellow card) 90'	Stadium: Ticha; Attendance: 1,200; Referee: Aleksandar Kostadinov

5 May 2012 27	Beroe	2 – 0	Cherno More	Stara Zagora
18:00 EEST	Livramento 18'; Angelov 38' (pen.); Zafirov (yellow card) 53'; Iliev (yellow card) 69'	Report	Yanev (yellow card) 82'; G. Iliev (yellow card) 83'	Stadium: Beroe; Attendance: 3,000; Referee: Ahmed Ahmed

14 May 2012 28	Cherno More	2 – 1	Vidima-Rakovski	Varna
18:00 EEST	Nikolov 44'; A. Iliev 79'; Popov (yellow card) 50'	Report	Stoychev 35'; Nakov (yellow card) 37'; R. Ivanov (yellow card) 68'; Chipev (yellow card) 72'	Stadium: Ticha; Attendance: 630; Referee: Angel Angelov

19 May 2012 29	Svetkavitsa	1 – 3	Cherno More	Targovishte
16:30 EEST	Marques 43'; Shokolarov (yellow card) 30'; Venkov (yellow card) 48'	Report	Georgiev 24' (o.g.); Kapitanov 59', 61'; Kapitanov (yellow card) 33'; Nikolov (yellow card) 63'	Stadium: Dimitar Burkov; Attendance: 250; Referee: Stoyan Denev

23 May 2012 30	Cherno More	2 – 0	Slavia	Varna
16:00 EEST	Rosen Kolev 59'; Nikolov 80'; D. Atanasov (yellow card); Camazzola (yellow card)	Report	Dyakov (yellow card); Filipov (yellow card); P. Dimitrov (yellow card)	Stadium: Ticha; Attendance: 500; Referee: Atanas Dimitrov

==== League table ====
Pos	Team	Pld	W	D	L	GF	GA	GD	Pts	Qualification or relegation
5	Litex Lovech	30	17	8	5	57	28	+29	59	
6	Lokomotiv Plovdiv	30	17	6	7	44	39	+5	57	Qualification for Europa League second qualifying round (Note: Ludogorets Razgrad won the 2011–12 Bulgarian Cup competition but were qualified for 2012–13 UEFA Champions League via winning the league, hence their Europa League berth was awarded to the cup runners-up, Lokomotiv Plovdiv.)
7	Cherno More	30	16	4	10	46	25	+21	52	
8	Slavia Sofia	30	15	6	9	42	36	+6	51	
9	Minyor Pernik	30	8	12	10	35	40	−5	36	

Source: A PFG (in Bulgarian)
Rules for classification: 1st points; 2nd head-to-head points; 3rd head-to-head goal difference; 4th head-to-head goals scored; 5th head-to-head away goals scored; 6th goal difference; 7th goals scored

==== Results summary ====
Overall								Home						Away					
Pld	W	D	L	GF	GA	GD	Pts	W	D	L	GF	GA	GD	W	D	L	GF	GA	GD
30	16	4	10	46	25	+21	52	10	1	4	26	9	+17	6	3	6	20	16	+4

Last updated: 31 May 2012.
Source: bulgarian-football.com

==== League performance ====
Round	1	2	3	4	5	6	7	8	9	10	11	12	13	14	15	16	17	18	19	20	21	22	23	24	25	26	27	28	29	30
Ground	H	H	A	H	A	H	A	H	A	H	A	H	A	H	A	A	A	H	A	H	A	H	A	H	A	H	A	H	A	H
Result	W	W	W	W	L	L	D	L	W	D	L	W	D	W	D	W	L	W	W	L	W	W	L	W	L	L	L	W	W	W
Position	1	1	1	2	4	6	6	7	7	7	8	8	8	8	8	7	8	8	8	8	8	8	8	7	7	8	8	8	8	7

Source: bulgarian-football.com
A = Away; H = Home; W = Win; D = Draw; L = Loss

=== Bulgarian Cup ===
23 November 2011 2nd Round	Minyor	1 – 1 (a.e.t.) (5 – 3 p)	Cherno More	Pernik
13:30 EET	Vasilev 69'; Bibishkov (yellow card) 50'; Bozhikov (yellow card) 77'	Report	Markov 32' (o.g.); Yanev (yellow card) 30'; Palomino (yellow card) 48'; S. Aleksandrov (yellow card) 67' (yellow-red card) 84'	Stadium: Minyor; Attendance: 1,000; Referee: Hristo Ristoskov
	Penalties
	Bibishkov (penalty scored); Tom (penalty scored); Vasilev (penalty scored); Trajanov (penalty scored); Hristozov (penalty scored)		Iliev (penalty scored); Camazzola (penalty scored); Palomino (penalty missed); Bozhilov (penalty scored)

== Squad statistics ==
Key:
‡ On loan from another club * First appearance(s) for the club

- # = Squad number
- Pos = Playing position
- P = Number of games played
- G = Number of goals scored
- GK = Goalkeeper
- DF = Defender
- MF = Midfielder
- FW = Forward
- = Yellow cards
- = Red cards
- † Permanent player left club during the season
- ¤ Loaned to another club for part or all of season

Correct as of 31 May 2012. Starting appearances are listed first, followed by substitute appearances in parentheses where applicable.

No.	Pos	Name	P	G	P	G	P	G	A yellow card	A red card	Notes
No.	Pos	Name	League		Bulgarian Cup		Total		Discipline		Notes
1	GK	(Bulgaria) Petar Denchev	12	0	0	0	12	0	1	0	
3	DF	(Bulgaria) Tsvetan Yotov	1	0	0	0	1	0	1	0	
5	MF	(Brazil) Samuel Camazzola	28	2	1	0	29	2	8	0	
7	MF	(Bulgaria) Stanislav Stoyanov †	0(2)	0	0	0	0(2)	0	0	0	
7	MF	(Bulgaria) Bekir Rasim	0(1)	0	0	0	0(1)	0	0	0	
8	MF	(Bulgaria) Doncho Atanasov	25	2	0	0	26	2	6	0	
9	FW	(Venezuela) Hermes Palomino	14(3)	4	1	0	15(3)	4	1	0	
10	FW	(Bulgaria) Miroslav Manolov	17(7)	7	0	0	17(7)	7	8	0	
11	MF	(Bulgaria) Todor Kolev †	1(1)	0	0	0	1(1)	0	1	0	
11	FW	(Bulgaria) Atanas Iliev	0(2)	1	0	0	0(2)	1	0	0	
12	GK	(Bulgaria) Nikolay Kirchev	0	0	0	0	0	0	0	0	
14	FW	(Bulgaria) Georgi Bozhilov	27	3	1	0	28	3	3	0	
15	DF	(Bulgaria) Aleksandar Aleksandrov	29	1	1	0	30	1	1	1	
16	MF	(Bulgaria) Dimitar Petkov †	4(7)	1	0	0	4(7)	1	1	0	
17	MF	(Bulgaria) Yancho Andreev	4(3)	0	0(1)	0	4(4)	0	2	1	
18	DF	(Bulgaria) Ivelin Yanev	25	0	1	0	26	0	7	0	
19	MF	(Bulgaria) Hristian Popov	11(4)	1	0	0	11(4)	1	3	0	
20	DF	(Bulgaria) Mihail Lazarov	0(2)	0	0	0	0(2)	0	0	0	
21	MF	(Bulgaria) Georgi Iliev (c)	27(1)	10	1	0	28(1)	10	6	0	
22	GK	(Bulgaria) Plamen Kolev	3(1)	0	0	0	3(1)	0	0	0	
23	MF	(Bulgaria) Simeon Simeonov	6(9)	0	1	0	7(9)	0	1	0	
24	MF	(Bulgaria) Veselin Marchev †	1(7)	0	1	0	2(7)	0	1	0	
24	DF	(Bulgaria) Slavi Stalev	0(1)	1	0	0	0(1)	0	0	0	
25	DF	(Bulgaria) Sasho Aleksandrov	25	1	1	0	26	1	11	2	
26	GK	(Bulgaria) Ilko Pirgov †	15	0	1	0	16	0	1	0	
27	MF	(Estonia) Daniil Ratnikov †	0(3)	0	0	0	0(3)	0	0	0	
30	FW	(Bulgaria) Ilian Kapitanov	11(4)	4	0	0	11(4)	4	1	0	
33	GK	(Bulgaria) Georgi Kitanov	0(2)	0	0	0	0(2)	0	0	0	
55	DF	(Bulgaria) Rosen Kolev	21	1	1	0	22	1	8	2	
77	MF	(Bulgaria) Viktor Mitev	0(5)	0	0	0	0(5)	0	0	0	
86	MF	(Venezuela) Marlon Fernández ‡	10	1	0	0	10	1	0	0	
90	FW	(Bulgaria) Rumen Nikolov	7(12)	4	0(1)	0	7(13)	4	1	0	
91	DF	(Bulgaria) Zhivko Atanasov	6(9)	1	0	0	6(9)	1	1	0	

=== Start formations ===
Accounts for all competitions. Numbers constitute according game of the competition in which the formation was used, NOT number of occurrences.

Qnt	Formation	Match(es)
29	4–2–3–1	All other matches
2	4–4–2 diamond	20, 24 A PFG

Last updated: 31 May 2012
Source: Match reports in Competitions
Only competitive matches.

== Club ==
=== Coaching staff ===
Position	Staff
Manager	(Bulgaria) Stefan Genov
Assistant First Team Coach	(Bulgaria) Emanuil Lukanov
Goalkeeper Coach	(Bulgaria) Krasimir Kolev
First Team Fitness Coach	(Bulgaria) Veselin Markov
Individual Team Fitness Coach	(Bulgaria) Viktor Bumbalov
Medical Director	(Bulgaria) Dr. Petko Atev
Academy Manager	(Bulgaria) Hristina Dimitrova

Last updated: 7 July 2011
Source: Cherno More

=== Other information ===
Owner/Chairman	(Bulgaria) Marin Mitev
Chief Executive	(Bulgaria) Marin Marinov
Sporting Director	(Bulgaria) Todor Velikov
Ground (capacity and dimensions)	Ticha Stadium (12,500 / 103x67 metres)

Updated to match played 7 July 2011
Source: Cherno More
