= Marlon Fernández =

Marlon Fernández may refer to:

- Marlon Fernández (singer) (born 1977), Cuban singer
- Marlon Fernández (footballer) (born 1986), Venezuelan footballer
