= Atanas Iliev =

Bulgarian footballer

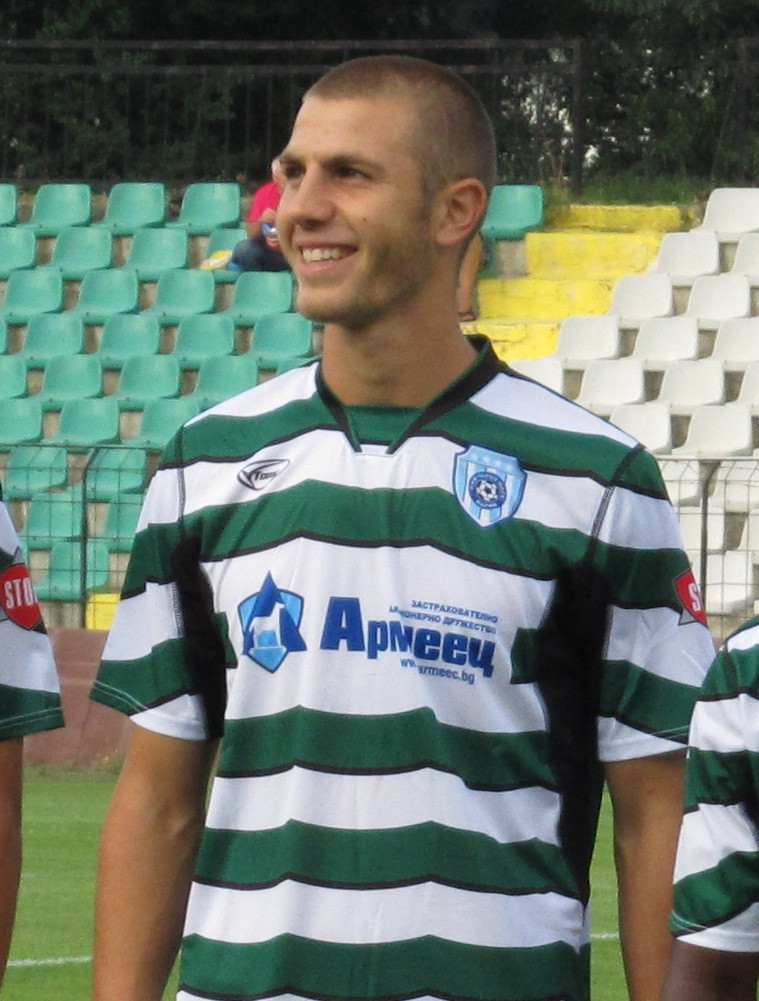
- Iliev with Cherno More in 2013

Personal information
- Full name: Atanas Petrov Iliev
- Date of birth: 9 October 1994 (age 32)
- Place of birth: Dobrich, Bulgaria
- Height: 1.89 m (6 ft 2 in)
- Position: Forward

Team information
- Current team: CSKA 1948
- Number: 9

Youth career
- 2003–2009: Dobrudzha
- 2009–2013: Cherno More

Senior career*
Years	Team	Apps	(Gls)
2012–2014	Cherno More	15	(2)
2014–2015	Dobrudzha	28	(17)
2015–2020	Montana	127	(52)
2020–2021	Botev Plovdiv	33	(17)
2021–2023	Ascoli	30	(2)
2023–2024	Cherno More	50	(15)
2024–2025	Anorthosis	26	(8)
2025–	CSKA 1948	45	(12)

International career^{‡}
2012	Bulgaria U19	2	(0)
2021–	Bulgaria	20	(4)
- * Club domestic league appearances and goals as of 31 October 2026 (UTC) ‡ National team caps and goals as of 20:13, 16 November 2026 (UTC)

Atanas Petrov Iliev (Bulgarian: Атанас Петров Илиев; born 9 October 1994) is Bulgarian professional footballer who plays as a forward for First League club CSKA 1948 Sofia.

== Club career ==
Born in Dobrich, Iliev began his career with the local club, Dobrudzha, before joining Cherno More's youth academy in 2009. He made his first team début in a 2–0 A PFG defeat at Beroe on 5 May 2012, coming on as a substitute for Ilian Kapitanov.

On 27 January 2023, Iliev's contract with Ascoli was terminated by mutual consent.

On 31 January 2023, Iliev returned to Cherno More.

== International career ==
Iliev was called up to the senior Bulgaria squad for the first time in March 2021 for the 2022 FIFA World Cup qualification matches against Switzerland on 25 March 2021, Italy on 28 March 2021 and Northern Ireland on 31 March 2021. He made his debut on 25 March 2021 against Switzerland.

== Career statistics ==
=== Club ===
As of 26 July 2025

Appearances and goals by club, season and competition
Club	Season	League			Cup		Continental		Other		Total	
Club	Season	Division	Apps	Goals	Apps	Goals	Apps	Goals	Apps	Goals	Apps	Goals
Cherno More Varna	2011–12	A Group	2	1	0	0	—		—		2	1
Cherno More Varna	2012–13	A Group	4	0	3	1	—		—		7	1
Cherno More Varna	2013–14	A Group	9	1	3	0	—		—		12	1
Cherno More Varna	Total		15	2	6	1	0	0	0	0	21	3
Dobrudzha Dobrich	2014–15	B Group	28	17	1	0	—		—		29	17
Montana	2015–16	A Group	30	5	6	3	—		—		36	8
Montana	2016–17	Bulgarian First League	18	2	4	3	—		—		22	5
Montana	2017–18	Second League	28	11	1	1	—		—		29	12
Montana	2018–19	Second League	29	18	2	0	—		—		31	18
Montana	2019–20	Second League	19	13	1	1	—		—		20	14
Montana	Total		127	52	8	3	0	0	0	0	136	56
Botev Plovdiv	2020–21	Bulgarian First League	28	16	2	1	—		—		30	17
Botev Plovdiv	2021–22	Bulgarian First League	5	1	0	0	—		—		5	1
Botev Plovdiv	Total		33	17	2	1	0	0	0	0	35	18
Ascoli	2021–22	Serie B	30	2	0	0	—		—		30	2
Cherno More Varna	2022–23	Bulgarian First League	16	3	3	1	—		—		19	4
Cherno More Varna	2023–24	Bulgarian First League	34	12	1	0	—		—		35	12
Cherno More Varna	Total		50	15	4	1	0	0	0	0	54	16
Anorthosis Famagusta	2024–25	Cypriot First Division	26	8	3	1	—		—		29	9
CSKA 1948	2025–26	Bulgarian First League	2	1	0	0	—		—		2	1
Career total			308	111	30	11	0	0	0	0	338	123

=== International ===
Scores and results list Bulgaria's goal tally first.

No.	Date	Venue	Cap	Opponent	Score	Result	Competition
1	1 June 2021	Keine Sorgen Arena, Ried im Innkreis, Austria	4	Slovakia	1–0	1–1	Friendly
2	2 September 2021	Stadio Artemio Franchi, Florence, Italy	7	Italy	1–1	1–1	2022 FIFA World Cup qualification
3	5 June 2022	Huvepharma Arena, Razgrad, Bulgaria	14	Georgia	1–2	2–5	2022–23 UEFA Nations League C
4	6 October 2026	Stade de Luxembourg, Luxembourg City, Luxembourg	18	Luxembourg	2–0	2–0	2026–27 UEFA Nations League C
