= Sebastjan Komel =

Slovenian footballer

Personal information
- Date of birth: 18 February 1986 (age 40)
- Place of birth: Šempeter pri Gorici, SFR Yugoslavia
- Height: 1.76 m (5 ft 9 in)
- Positions: Left midfielder; left-back

Youth career
- –2005: Gorica

Senior career*
Years	Team	Apps	(Gls)
2006	Brda	12	(1)
2006	Bela Krajina	15	(0)
2007–2010	Gorica	91	(7)
2011	Brussels	7	(1)
2011–2012	Randers	1	(0)
2012–2013	Royal Antwerp	15	(0)
2013	Cherno More	11	(0)
2014	Kras Repen	12	(0)

International career
2006–2007	Slovenia U20	6	(1)
2006–2008	Slovenia U21	12	(0)
- * Club domestic league appearances and goals

Sebastjan Komel (born 18 February 1986) is a Slovenian former professional footballer who played as a left midfielder or left-back.
