= Veselin Marchev =

Bulgarian footballer

Personal information
- Full name: Veselin Valentinov Marchev
- Date of birth: 7 February 1990 (age 36)
- Place of birth: Plovdiv, Bulgaria
- Height: 1.77 m (5 ft 10 in)
- Positions: Winger; forward

Team information
- Current team: Krumovgrad
- Number: 9

Youth career
- Lokomotiv Plovdiv

Senior career*
| Years | Team | Apps | (Gls) |
| 2008–2010 | Lokomotiv Plovdiv | 12 | (0) |
| 2010 | → Septemvri Simitli (loan) | 11 | (0) |
| 2010 | Brestnik 1948 | 12 | (1) |
| 2011 | Sliven 2000 | 14 | (1) |
| 2011 | Cherno More | 8 | (0) |
| 2012 | Flota Świnoujście | 4 | (1) |
| 2012–2013 | Pirin Gotse Delchev | 51 | (8) |
| 2014 | Slavia Sofia | 11 | (4) |
| 2014–2015 | Ayia Napa | 25 | (3) |
| 2015 | Nea Salamina | 9 | (1) |
| 2016–2018 | Lokomotiv Plovdiv | 76 | (12) |
| 2018–2019 | Arda Kardzhali | 30 | (4) |
| 2019–2020 | Hebar Pazardzhik | 14 | (3) |
| 2020–2021 | Asteras Vlachioti | 16 | (3) |
| 2021–2024 | Maritsa Plovdiv | 95 | (21) |
| 2024–2025 | Sayana Haskovo | 33 | (10) |
| 2025–2026 | Maritsa Plovdiv | 36 | (17) |
| 2026– | Krumovgrad | 12 | (12) |

International career
| 2010–2011 | Bulgaria U21 | 5 | (1) |
- * Club domestic league appearances and goals as of 15:30, 30 October 2026 (UTC)

Veselin Marchev (Bulgarian: Веселин Марчев; born 7 February 1990) is a Bulgarian professional footballer who plays as a forward or winger for Krumovgrad.

== Career ==
On 12 June 2018, Marchev signed with Arda.
