= Stamen Angelov =

Bulgarian footballer

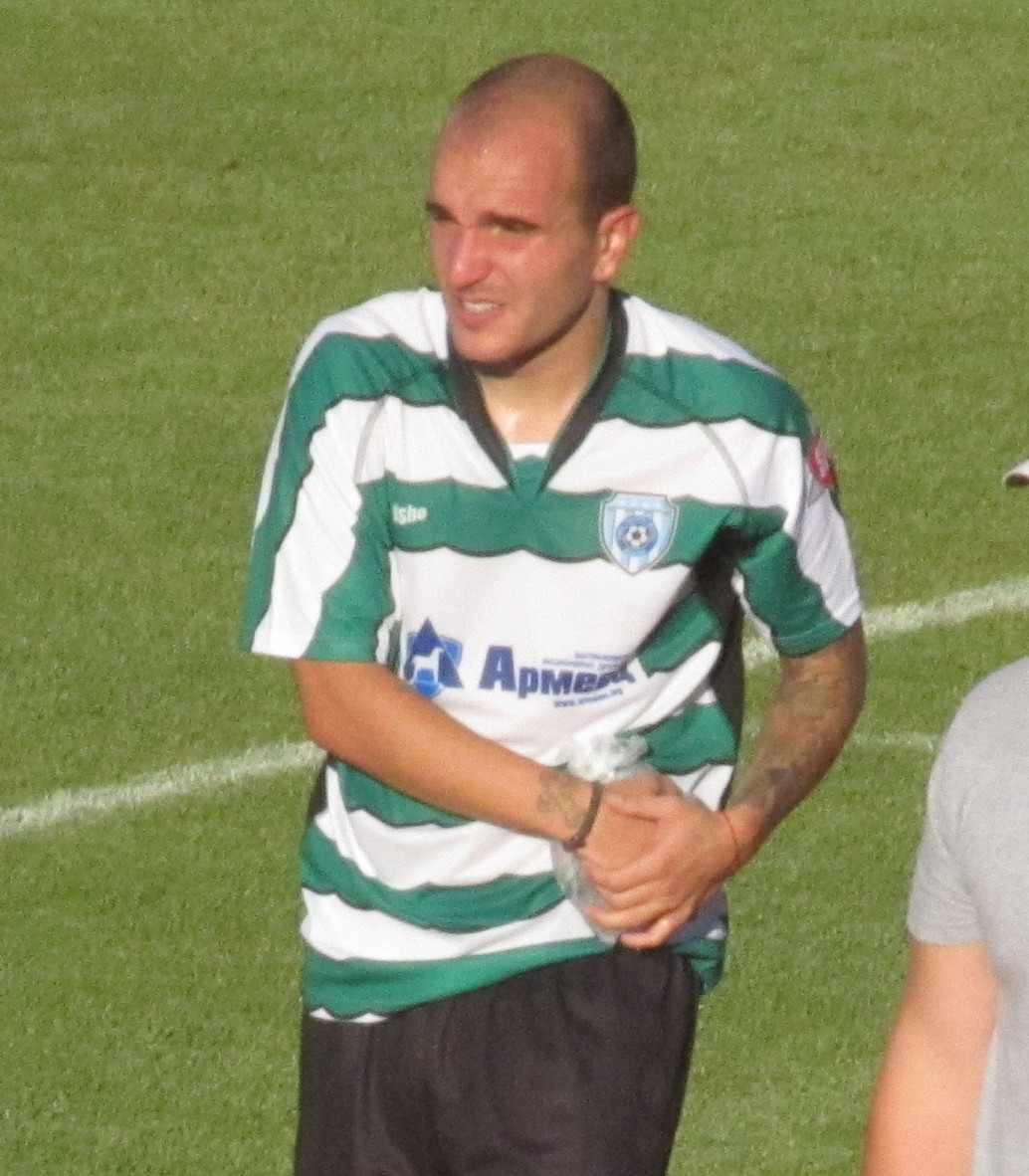

Personal information
- Full name: Stamen Angelov Angelov
- Date of birth: 1 June 1987 (age 39)
- Place of birth: Burgas, Bulgaria
- Height: 1.79 m (5 ft 10 1/2 in)
- Position: Midfielder

Senior career*
Years	Team	Apps	(Gls)
2004–2006	Pomorie	10	(0)
2006–2007	Naftex Burgas	10	(0)
2008	Chernomorets Burgas	9	(0)
2008	Nesebar	11	(0)
2009	Naftex Burgas	10	(0)
2010	Ravda 1954	10	(0)
2011	Etar 1924	5	(0)
2011–2012	Neftochimic 1986 Burgas	22	(1)
2012	Cherno More	8	(0)
2013	Neftochimic 1986 Burgas	28	(1)
2014	Rakovski	13	(0)
2014	Etar Veliko Tarnovo		
2015–2018	Nesebar	69	(13)
- * Club domestic league appearances and goals

Stamen Angelov (Bulgarian: Стамен Ангелов; born 1 June 1987) is a former Bulgarian professional footballer who played as a midfielder.

== Awards ==
- Champion of B PFG 2013 (with Neftochimic 1986 Burgas)
