= Hermes Palomino =

Venezuelan footballer (born 1988)

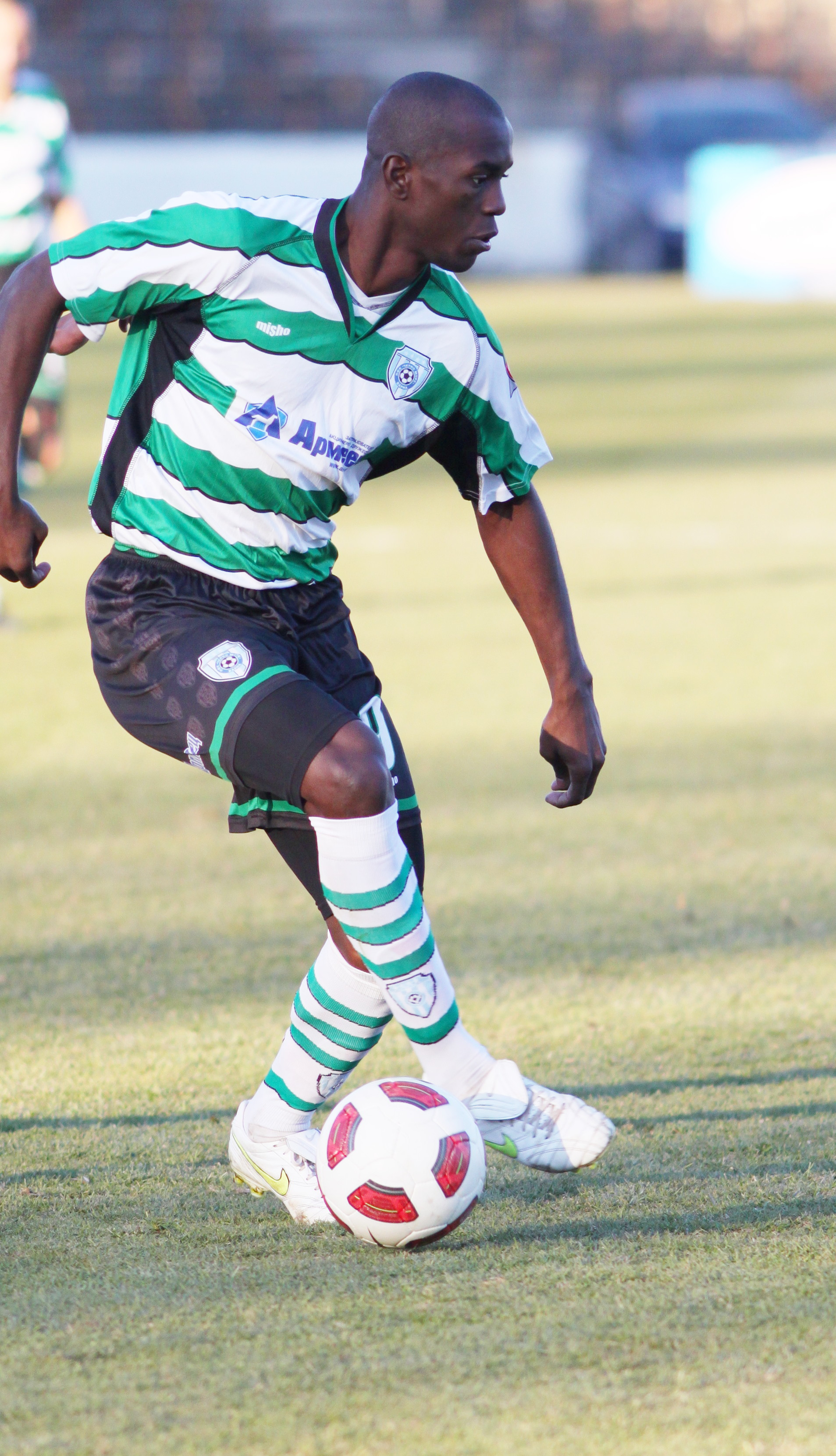

Personal information
- Full name: Hermes Manuel Palomino Fariñes
- Date of birth: 4 March 1988 (age 38)
- Place of birth: Caracas, Venezuela
- Height: 1.80 m (5 ft 11 in)
- Position: Forward

Senior career*
Years	Team	Apps	(Gls)
2006–2007	Trujillanos	9	(0)
2007–2008	Carabobo	17	(3)
2008	Guaros de Lara	13	(1)
2009	Minervén	15	(4)
2009–2011	Aragua	54	(10)
2011–2013	Cherno More	35	(6)
2013–2014	Atlético Venezuela	14	(2)
2014–2015	Aragua	7	(1)
2015	Deportivo Petare	13	(0)
2016	Managua	15	(4)
2017	PEPO	20	(13)
2018	Atlético Vega Real	9	(1)
2018	PEPO	10	(5)
2019	FC Sevlievo		
2019	Lija Athletic	8	(3)
2020	Lovćen	3	(0)
2021	Gran Valencia	9	(1)

International career
2011	Venezuela	1	(0)
- * Club domestic league appearances and goals as of 21:20, 1 April 2021 (UTC)

Hermes Manuel Palomino Fariñes (born 4 March 1988 in Caracas) is a Venezuelan footballer who currently plays as a forward.

== Club career ==
=== In Venezuela ===
Palomino started playing as a professional at the age of eighteen with Trujillanos. The following year, he joined Carabobo but, after one season playing with the team, was bought by Guaros de Lara.

Palomino played also for two other Venezuelan clubs, Minervén and Aragua, until 2011, when he joined Bulgarian A PFG side Cherno More Varna.

=== Cherno More ===
On 1 July 2011 Palomino scored on his debut in a pre-season friendly against Dacia Chişinău, netting the second in a 2–2 draw. He made his league debut for Cherno More in a 2–0 win over Montana on 6 August. Week later, Palomino scored his first goal in the Bulgarian A PFG in their 3–1 home win against Levski Sofia. On 27 August he assisted Ilian Kapitanov for the second goal in a 2–0 home victory over Minyor Pernik. On 18 October, in a 5–0 away victory over Kaliakra Kavarna, he assisted Georgi Iliev for the first goal in the match and scored Cherno More's third. On 28 November, in a 1–1 away draw against Slavia Sofia, Palomino netted his third goal of the season.

During the winter break, he was close to being transferred to Zorya Luhansk, but the deal eventually fell through. He missed the last games of the 2011–12 A PFG season due to sustaining an injury. Palomino was mostly confined to substitute appearances following Georgi Ivanov's appointment as head coach.

=== Atlético Venezuela ===
On 25 May 2013, Palomino signed with Atlético Venezuela on a two-year deal.

=== FC Sevlievo ===
In January 2019, he signed for FC Sevlievo in Bulgaria after two seasons in Finland for PEPO.

=== Lovćen ===
In February 2020, Palomino moved to Montenegro to join FK Lovćen.

== International career ==
In December 2011, Palomino received his first call-up to the national team for a friendly game against Costa Rica. On 22 December, he made his debut, coming on as a second-half substitute for Louis Angelo Peña in the match that was lost by a score of 0–2.
