= Martin Dechev =

Bulgarian footballer (1990–2024)

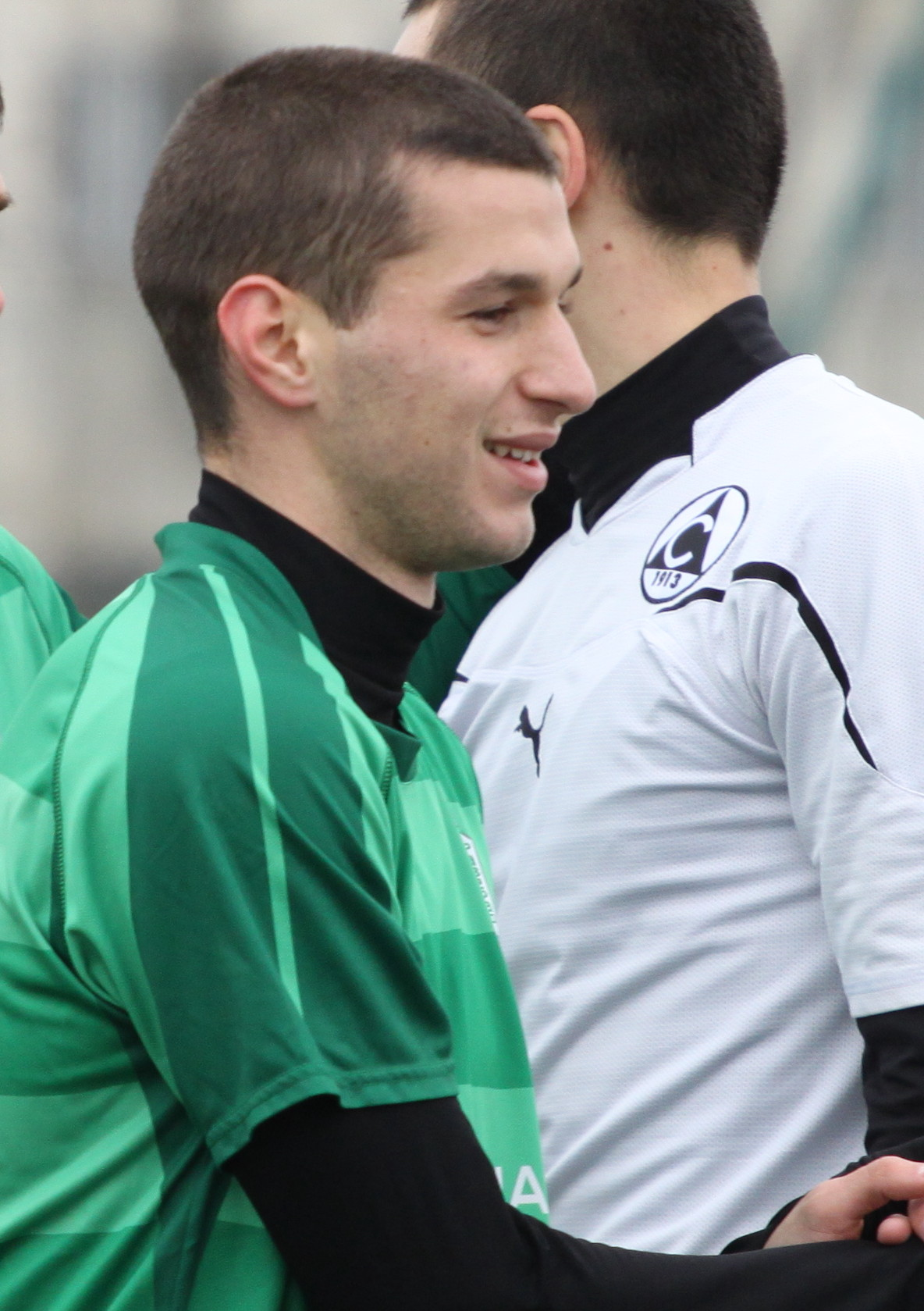

Personal information
- Full name: Martin Borislavov Dechev
- Date of birth: 12 April 1990
- Place of birth: Sofia, Bulgaria
- Date of death: 21 December 2024 (aged 34)
- Place of death: Sofia, Bulgaria
- Position: Right-back

Youth career
- CSKA Sofia

Senior career*
Years	Team	Apps	(Gls)
2009–2012	CSKA Sofia	8	(0)
2009–2010	→ Lokomotiv Mezdra (loan)	2	(0)
2011	→ Ludogorets Razgrad (loan)	4	(0)
2012	Cherno More	8	(0)
2013	Montana	13	(0)
2014	Vitosha Bistritsa	9	(3)
2014	Oborishte	10	(2)
2015–2016	Slavia Sofia	9	(0)
- * Club domestic league appearances and goals

Martin Borislavov Dechev (Bulgarian: Мартин Бориславов Дечев; 12 April 1990 – 21 December 2024) was a Bulgarian footballer who played as a right-back. He died whilst playing a charity football match, on 21 December 2024, at the age of 34.
