= Detelin Dimitrov =

Bulgarian footballer

Detelin Dimtrov
Personal information
- Full name: Detelin Dimitrinov Dimitrov
- Date of birth: 17 January 1983 (age 43)
- Place of birth: Dobrich, Bulgaria
- Height: 1.84 m (6 ft 1/2 in)
- Position: Left back

Team information
- Current team: TSV Grabenstätt

Youth career
- Dobrudzha Dobrich

Senior career*
Years	Team	Apps	(Gls)
2002–2004	Dobrudzha Dobrich		
2004–2005	Cherno More	26	(0)
2006	Dobrudzha Dobrich	7	(0)
2006–2012	Kaliakra Kavarna	126	(11)
2012–2013	Cherno More	13	(0)
2013–2014	Dobrudzha Dobrich	25	(1)
2015	Kaliakra Kavarna	23	(4)
2016	DJK Rosenheim	7	(0)
2017–	TSV Grabenstätt	5	(0)
- * Club domestic league appearances and goals as of 1 July 2017

Detelin Dimitrov (Bulgarian: Детелин Димитров; born 17 January 1983) is a Bulgarian footballer who currently plays as a defender for German club TSV Grabenstätt.
