= Yancho Andreev =

Bulgarian footballer

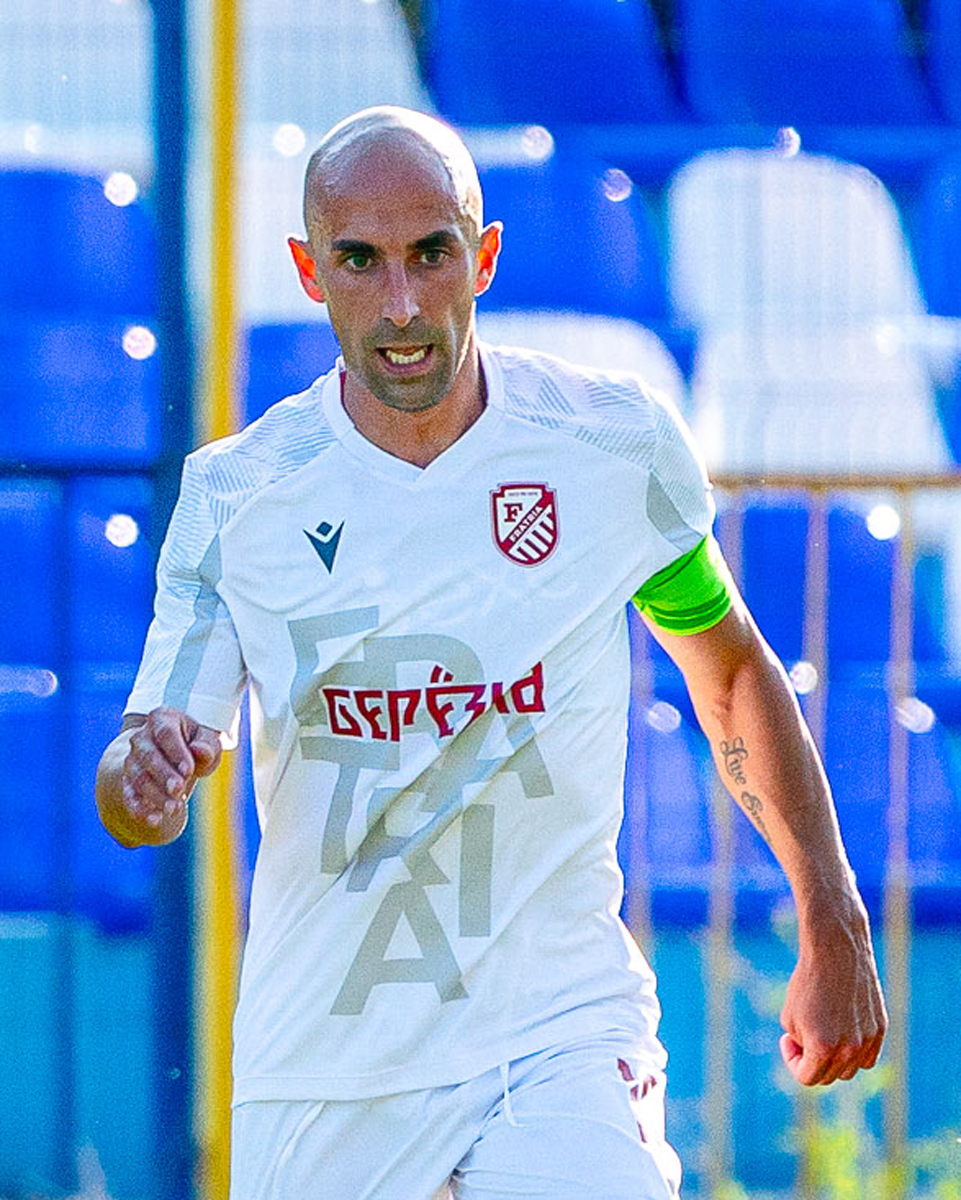
- Andreev playing for Fratria in 2024.

Personal information
- Full name: Yancho Ivanov Andreev
- Date of birth: 8 January 1990 (age 36)
- Place of birth: Dobrich, Bulgaria
- Height: 1.82 m (6 ft 0 in)
- Position: Midfielder

Team information
- Current team: Benkovski Isperih
- Number: 11

Youth career
- –2009: Cherno More

Senior career*
Years	Team	Apps	(Gls)
2009–2012	Cherno More	11	(0)
2009–2010	→ Chernomorets Balchik (loan)	24	(2)
2012	Kaliakra Kavarna	12	(2)
2013	Edirnespor	7	(4)
2013	Minyor Pernik	?	(?)
2014	Vitosha Bistritsa	12	(1)
2014	Oborishte	8	(0)
2015	Vitosha Bistritsa	11	(0)
2015–2018	Botev Ihtiman	?	(?)
2019–2020	Dobrudzha	12	(2)
2020–2023	Spartak Varna	52	(26)
2023–2024	Dobrudzha	35	(4)
2024	Fratria	16	(4)
2024–2025	Sportist Svoge	7	(0)
2024–2025	Benkovski Isperih	3	(4)
- * Club domestic league appearances and goals as of 13:13, 9 December 2024 (UTC)

Yancho Ivanov Andreev (Bulgarian: Янчо Андреев; born 8 January 1990) is a Bulgarian footballer who plays as a midfielder for Benkovski Isperih.
