= Simeon Simeonov (footballer, born 1983) =

Bulgarian footballer

Personal information
- Full name: Simeon Ivanov Simeonov
- Date of birth: 13 July 1983 (age 43)
- Place of birth: Dobrich, Bulgaria
- Height: 1.80 m (5 ft 11 in)
- Position: Centre midfielder

Youth career
- 1989–1997: Dobrudzha Dobrich
- 1997–2001: CSKA Sofia

Senior career*
Years	Team	Apps	(Gls)
2002–2007	Dobrudzha Dobrich	95	(12)
2008–2009	Naftex Burgas	33	(1)
2009–2011	Dobrudzha Dobrich	54	(5)
2011–2013	Cherno More	30	(0)
2013–2014	Dobrudzha Dobrich	38	(4)
2015–2016	Kaliakra Kavarna		
2016–2018	Dobrudzha Dobrich		
- * Club domestic league appearances and goals

Simeon Simeonov (Bulgarian: Симеон Симеонов; born 13 July 1983) is a former Bulgarian footballer who played as a midfielder.

In 1997, Simeonov joined the CSKA Sofia youth set-up, progressing to the reserve team during the 2001–02 season. He received a call up for the Bulgarian Cup match against Yantra Gabrovo on 24 October 2001, featuring on the bench.
