= Doncho Atanasov =

Bulgarian footballer

Personal information
- Full name: Doncho Angelov Atanasov
- Date of birth: 2 April 1983 (age 43)
- Place of birth: Stara Zagora, Bulgaria
- Height: 1.80 m (5 ft 11 in)
- Position: Left winger

Youth career
- Beroe

Senior career*
Years	Team	Apps	(Gls)
2001–2002	Beroe	11	(0)
2005–2006	Minyor Radnevo	39	(17)
2006–2010	Beroe	70	(12)
2010–2012	Cherno More	58	(8)
2013	Beroe	16	(1)
2013	Lyubimets 2007	9	(0)
2014	Haskovo	16	(2)
2015	Limanovia Limanowa	14	(2)
2015–2016	Vereya	19	(4)
2016–2017	Botev Galabovo	17	(0)
Total		269	(46)

Managerial career
- 2017–: Beroe (youth)
- * Club domestic league appearances and goals

Doncho Angelov Atanasov (Bulgarian: Дончо Ангелов Атанасов; born on 2 April 1983) is a Bulgarian former professional footballer who played as a left winger.

== Career ==
Doncho Atanasov came from the youth system of Beroe Stara Zagora, and was called up to the first team squad for the 2001–02 season. On 9 February 2002, he made his A PFG debut as he replaced Krum Bibishkov in the 69th minute of their 0–2 home loss against Litex Lovech. He only made 11 appearances for Beroe's first team before moving to Armeets Sliven in June 2002. On 19 July 2014, Atanasov scored the only goal in Haskovo's 1:0 victory over reigning A PFG champions Ludogorets Razgrad to provide his team with a winning start in the new league season.

Atanasov played for Botev Galabovo one season before being released in June 2017. On 1 September 2017, he announced his retirement as footballer.

== Honours ==
Beroe

- Bulgarian Cup: 2009–10, 2012–13
