= Hristian Popov =

Bulgarian footballer

Personal information
- Full name: Hristian Emilov Popov
- Date of birth: 5 February 1990 (age 36)
- Place of birth: Plovdiv, Bulgaria
- Height: 1.83 m (6 ft 0 in)
- Position: Midfielder

Team information
- Current team: FCM Schwerin

Youth career
- 2000–2008: Lokomotiv Plovdiv

Senior career*
Years	Team	Apps	(Gls)
2008–2010	Lokomotiv Plovdiv	8	(0)
2010	→ Septemvri Simitli (loan)	1	(0)
2011	Sliven 2000	13	(0)
2011–2012	Cherno More	22	(1)
2013	Svilengrad 1921	?	(?)
2013–2014	Berliner AK	15	(0)
2014–2015	Montana	15	(0)
2016	Vereya	2	(0)
2016–	FCM Schwerin	0	(0)

International career
2011	Bulgaria U-21	1	(0)
- * Club domestic league appearances and goals as of 8 July 2016

Hristian Emilov Popov (Bulgarian: Християн Попов; born 5 February 1990 in Plovdiv) is a Bulgarian footballer who currently plays as a midfielder for FCM Schwerin.
