= Plamen Kolev =

Bulgarian footballer

Personal information
- Full name: Plamen Petkov Kolev
- Date of birth: 9 February 1988 (age 38)
- Place of birth: Stara Zagora, Bulgaria
- Height: 1.82 m (6 ft 0 in)
- Position: Goalkeeper

Team information
- Current team: Nesebar

Senior career*
Years	Team	Apps	(Gls)
2005–2008	Beroe	16	(0)
2008	Minyor Pernik	0	(0)
2009–2010	Chernomorets Burgas	0	(0)
2010	→ Pomorie (loan)	2	(0)
2011	Vidima-Rakovski	15	(0)
2012	Cherno More	5	(0)
2013	Vereya	?	(?)
2013–2014	Neftochimic 1986	0	(0)
2014–2015	Bansko	15	(0)
2015–2016	Lokomotiv GO	29	(0)
2016–2018	Vereya	25	(0)
2018–2019	Botev Galabovo	27	(0)
2019	Beroe	1	(0)
2020	Sozopol	0	(0)
2020–2021	Neftochimic	5	(0)
2022–	Nesebar		
- * Club domestic league appearances and goals as of 18:53, 25 October 2022 (UTC)

Plamen Kolev (Bulgarian: Пламен Колев; born 9 February 1988) is a Bulgarian footballer who plays as a goalkeeper for OFC Nesebar.

== Career ==
Plamen Kolev made his first team debut for Beroe in a 6–0 win over Chernomorets Burgas Sofia on 19 May 2007, coming on as a substitute for Daniel Bekono. During his three years in Beroe he played in 16 matches.

He subsequently spent six months as the second-choice goalkeeper at Minyor Pernik, behind Ivaylo Ivanov, and failed to make a single appearance for the team in the league.

Kolev joined Cherno More Varna on 27 December 2011.

On 2 July 2018, Kolev signed with Botev Galabovo.

== Statistics ==
All stats correct as of 16 December 2012.

Club	Season	League		Cup		Continental		Other		Total	
Club	Season	Apps	Goals	Apps	Goals	Apps	Goals	Apps	Goals	Apps	Goals
Beroe Stara Zagora	2005–06	0	0	0	0	—	—	—	—	0	0
Beroe Stara Zagora	2006–07	1	0	0	0	—	—	—	—	1	0
Beroe Stara Zagora	2007–08	15	0	0	0	—	—	—	—	15	0
Beroe Stara Zagora	Total	16	0	0	0	0	0	0	0	16	0
Minyor Pernik	2008–09	0	0	0	0	—	—	—	—	0	0
Minyor Pernik	Total	0	0	0	0	0	0	0	0	0	0
Chernomorets Burgas	2008–09	0	0	0	0	—	—	—	—	0	0
Chernomorets Burgas	2009–10	0	0	0	0	—	—	—	—	0	0
Chernomorets Burgas	Total	0	0	0	0	0	0	0	0	0	0
Chernomorets Pomorie	2009–10	2	0	0	0	—	—	—	—	2	0
Chernomorets Pomorie	2010–11	0	0	3	0	—	—	—	—	3	0
Chernomorets Pomorie	Total	2	0	3	0	0	0	0	0	5	0
Vidima-Rakovski	2010–11	10	0	0	0	—	—	—	—	10	0
Vidima-Rakovski	2011–12	5	0	0	0	—	—	—	—	5	0
Vidima-Rakovski	Total	15	0	0	0	0	0	0	0	15	0
Cherno More	2011–12	4	0	0	0	—	—	—	—	4	0
Cherno More	2012–13	1	0	4	0	—	—	—	—	5	0
Cherno More	Total	5	0	4	0	0	0	0	0	9	0
