= Fernando Livramento =

Portuguese footballer

Personal information
- Full name: António Fernando Amaro Livramento
- Date of birth: 3 March 1982 (age 44)
- Place of birth: Tavira, Portugal
- Height: 1.71 m (5 ft 7 in)
- Position: Midfielder

Youth career
- 1992–1999: Ginásio Tavira

Senior career*
| Years | Team | Apps | (Gls) |
| 1999–2000 | Ginásio Tavira | | |
| 2000–2001 | Benfica B | 23 | (1) |
| 2001–2003 | Farense | 8 | (0) |
| 2002 | → Louletano (loan) | 10 | (0) |
| 2003–2005 | Olhanense | 66 | (14) |
| 2005–2007 | Santa Clara | 58 | (9) |
| 2007 | Boavista | 9 | (0) |
| 2007 | Leixões | 6 | (0) |
| 2008–2009 | Rio Ave | 34 | (2) |
| 2009–2010 | Paços Ferreira | 8 | (0) |
| 2011 | Leixões | 5 | (0) |
| 2011–2012 | Chaves | 10 | (2) |
| 2012 | Beroe | 26 | (1) |
| 2013 | Slavia Sofia | 13 | (3) |
| 2013–2014 | Farense | 22 | (1) |
| 2014–2015 | Lokomotiv Sofia | 30 | (1) |
| 2015–2016 | Lincoln Red Imps | | |
| 2016–2018 | Farense | 41 | (9) |
| Total | | 369 | (43) |

International career
| 2000–2001 | Portugal U18 | 7 | (0) |
- * Club domestic league appearances and goals

António Fernando Amado Livramento (born 3 March 1982 in Tavira, Algarve) is a Portuguese former professional footballer who played as a midfielder.
