= Aleksandar Aleksandrov (footballer, born July 1986) =

Bulgarian footballer (born 1986)

Sasho Aleksandrov
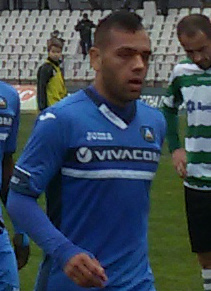

Personal information
- Full name: Aleksandar Emilov Aleksandrov
- Date of birth: 30 July 1986 (age 40)
- Place of birth: Sofia, Bulgaria
- Height: 1.73 m (5 ft 8 in)
- Position: Right back

Team information
- Current team: Marek Dupnitsa (head coach)

Youth career
- Septemvri Sofia

Senior career*
Years	Team	Apps	(Gls)
2004–2006	Conegliano German	19	(0)
2006–2007	Minyor Pernik	19	(3)
2007–2008	Lokomotiv Stara Zagora	?	(?)
2008–2009	Beroe Stara Zagora	38	(0)
2010–2014	Cherno More	135	(2)
2015–2017	Levski Sofia	57	(0)
2017	Etar Veliko Tarnovo	19	(1)
2018	Slavia Sofia	19	(0)
2019–2021	CSKA 1948	57	(0)
2021	Tsarsko Selo	13	(0)
2022–2023	CSKA 1948	18	(0)
2022–2023	CSKA 1948 II	25	(1)
Total		419+	(7+)

Managerial career
- 2023: CSKA 1948 U17
- 2023–2024: CSKA 1948 III
- 2024: CSKA 1948 II
- 2024: CSKA 1948 III
- 2025: CSKA 1948 III
- 2025: CSKA 1948
- 2025: CSKA 1948 II
- 2026: CSKA 1948
- 2026–: Marek Dupnitsa
- * Club domestic league appearances and goals

Aleksandar Aleksandrov (Bulgarian: Александър Александров; born 30 July 1986), better known as Sasho Aleksandrov, is a Bulgarian retired professional footballer and now manager. Mainly a right back, he also played as a wingback.

== Career ==
=== Early career ===
Sasho Aleksandrov began his career for Conegliano German, after initially playing for Septemvri Sofia as a youngster. He played 19 times for Conegliano before moving to Minyor Pernik in 2006.

=== Cherno More ===
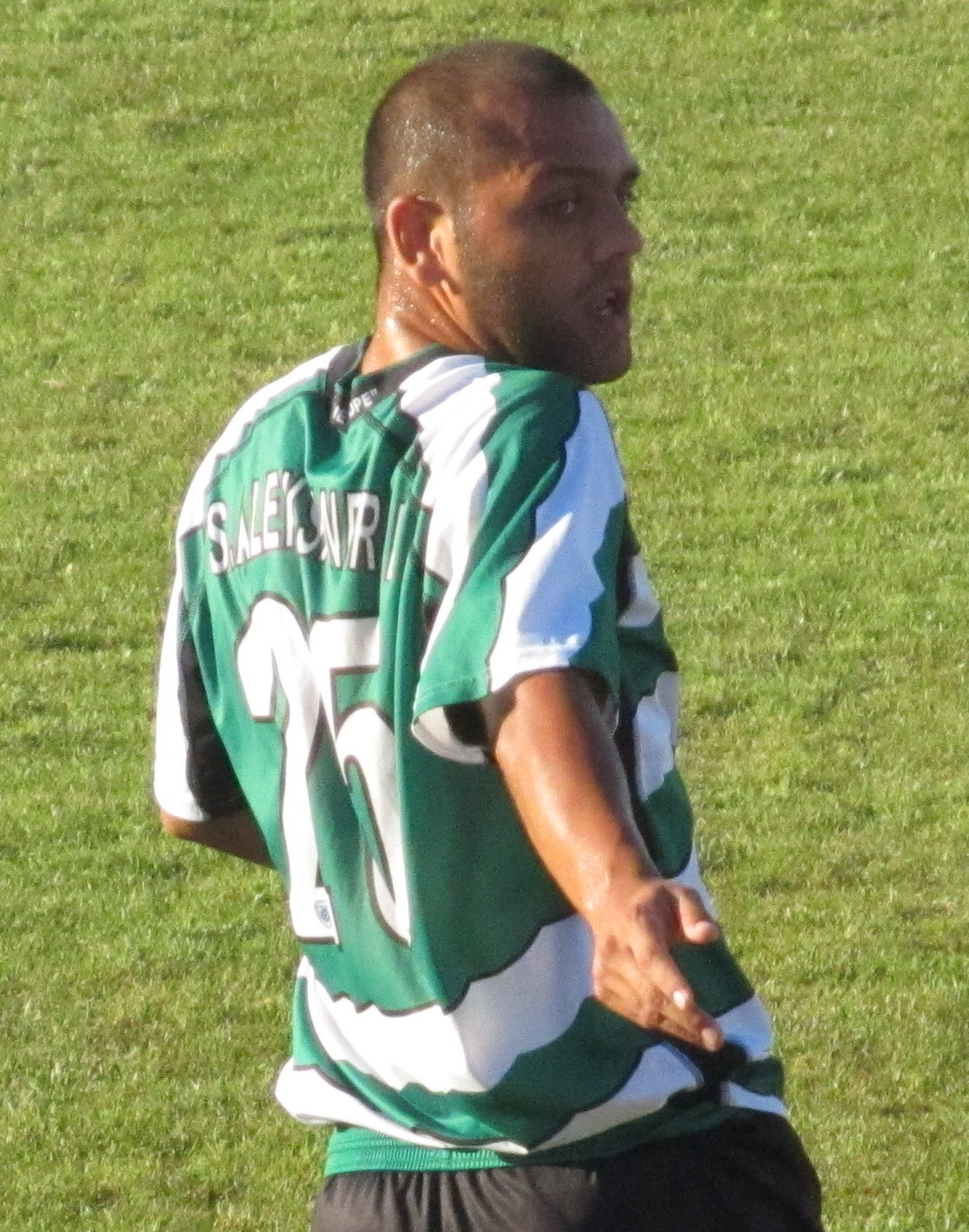
Aleksandrov playing for Cherno More in 2012

On 8 January 2010, Aleksandrov signed for Cherno More Varna. He made his league debut in a 2–0 home win against Chernomorets Burgas on 1 March, playing the full 90 minutes.

On 17 October 2010, Sasho scored his first competitive goal for Cherno More against Slavia Sofia on his 20th league appearance for the club. He scored an 88th minute winning header in his side's 3–2 victory.

Aleksandrov started the 2012–13 season as a makeshift wide midfielder.

In December 2014, Aleksandrov left Cherno More after his contract expired in order to sign for Levski Sofia.

=== Levski Sofia ===
Aleksandrov signed with Levski Sofia on 8 January 2015 on a two-year deal. He made his A PFG debut for the "bluemen" on 27 February 2015, after coming on as a second-half substitute for Bozhidar Kraev in the 8:0 home rout against Haskovo. During his time with Levski he was nicknamed Sasho Alves by the fans because of the visual similarity with Dani Alves. He was released by the club in June 2017.

=== Etar ===
On 21 June 2017, Aleksandrov signed a 1-year contract with Etar.

== Career stats ==
Season	Club	Level	Apps	Goals
2014–15	Levski Sofia	I	0	0
2014–15	Cherno More	I	17	0
2013–14	Cherno More	I	30	0
2012–13	Cherno More	I	26	0
2011–12	Cherno More	I	25	1
2010–11	Cherno More	I	27	1
2009–10	Cherno More	I	10	0
2009–10	Beroe Stara Zagora	I	15	0
2008–09	Beroe Stara Zagora	II	23	0
2007–08	Lokomotiv Stara Zagora	III	?	?
2006–07	Minyor Pernik	II	19	3
2005–06	Conegliano	II	9	0
2004–05	Conegliano	II	10	0

== Honours ==
Slavia Sofia

- Bulgarian Cup (1): 2017–18
