= Ivelin Yanev =

Bulgarian footballer

Personal information
- Full name: Ivelin Dimchev Yanev
- Date of birth: 23 November 1981 (age 44)
- Place of birth: Burgas, Bulgaria
- Height: 1.78 m (5 ft 10 in)
- Position: Left back

Youth career
- Neftochimic Burgas

Senior career*
Years	Team	Apps	(Gls)
2002–2006	Naftex Burgas	26	(0)
2006–2007	Chernomorets Burgas	5	(0)
2007–2010	Sliven 2000	57	(8)
2010	Chernomorets Balchik	14	(0)
2011	Etar 1924	8	(0)
2011–2012	Cherno More	28	(0)
2013	Lokomotiv Sofia	1	(0)
2013–2014	Neftochimic 1986	31	(0)
2014–2020	Karnobat		
- * Club domestic league appearances and goals

Ivelin Yanev (Bulgarian: Ивелин Янев; born 23 November 1981) is a former Bulgarian professional footballer who played as a defender.
