= Tsvetan Yotov =

Bulgarian footballer

Personal information
- Full name: Tsvetan Nikolov Yotov
- Date of birth: 3 June 1989 (age 37)
- Place of birth: Stamboliyski, Bulgaria
- Height: 1.84 m (6 ft 0 in)
- Position: Centre back

Team information
- Current team: Gigant Saedinenie
- Number: 6

Youth career
- Trakia Stamboliyski
- Maritsa Plovdiv

Senior career*
Years	Team	Apps	(Gls)
2007–2010	Maritsa Plovdiv		
2010	Lokomotiv Plovdiv	0	(0)
2011	Spartak Plovdiv	7	(0)
2011–2012	Cherno More	1	(0)
2013	Spartak Plovdiv	14	(0)
2014	Rakovski	10	(1)
2015–2017	Gigant Saedinenie	74	(3)
2017–2018	Maritsa Plovdiv	5	(0)
2018–	Gigant Saedinenie		
- * Club domestic league appearances and goals as of 6 December 2017

Tsvetan Nikolov Yotov (Bulgarian: Цветан Йотов; born 3 June 1989, in Stamboliyski) is a Bulgarian football player who currently plays for Gigant Saedinenie as a centre-back.

== Career ==
On 5 July 2011, Yotov signed with the elite club Cherno More after a successful trial period. He couldn't break into the team and was released in July 2012. He went on trial at Lokomotiv Plovdiv and later re-joined his old club Spartak Plovdiv in 2013. On 26 January 2014, Yotov left Spartak Plovdiv, joining Rakovski in B PFG. On 27 February 2015, following Rakovski's dissolution, Yotov signed with Gigant Saedinenie. On 12 June 2017, he moved to his hometown club Maritsa Plovdiv.
