= Tsvetomir Tsonkov =

Bulgarian footballer

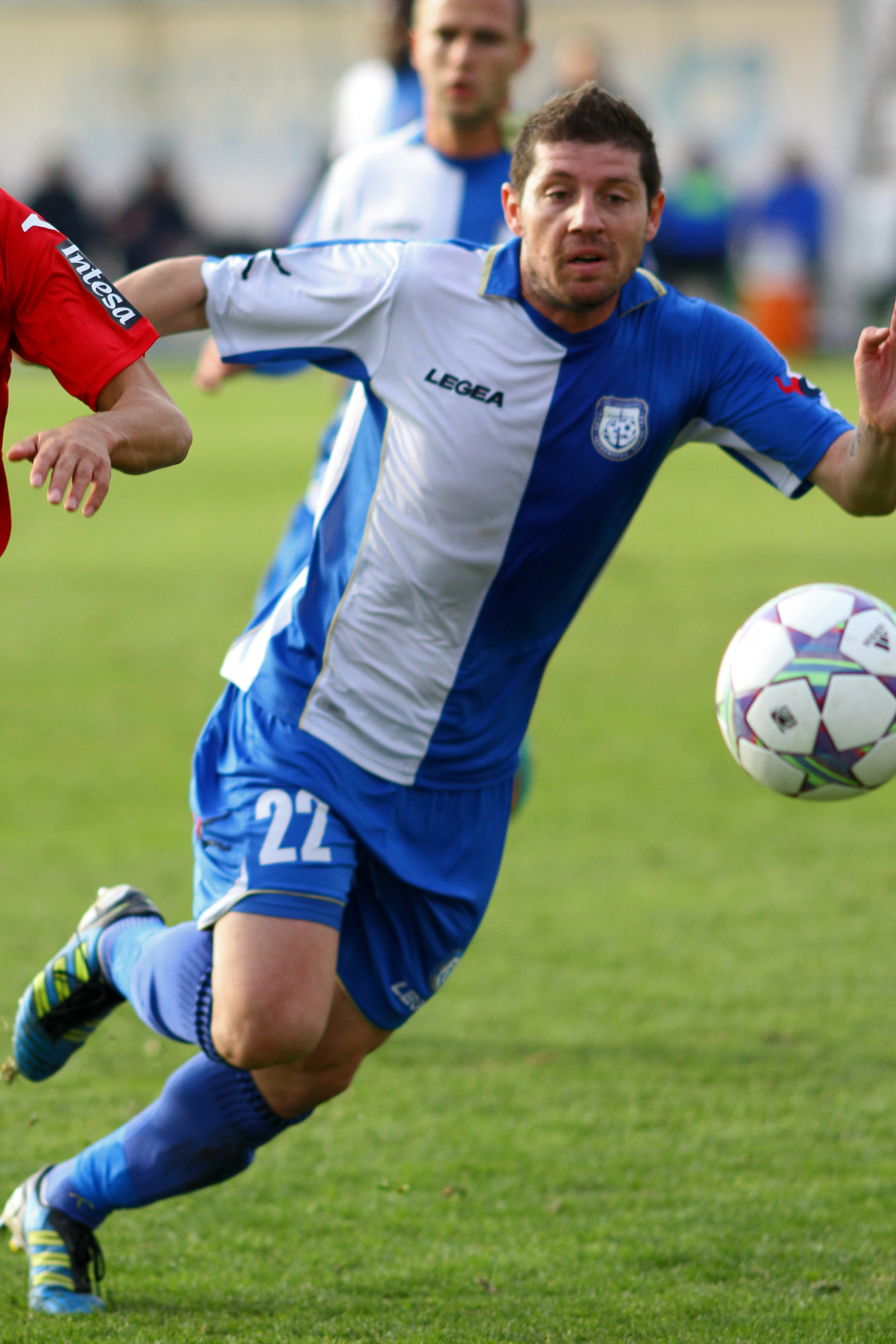

Personal information
- Full name: Tsvetomir Ivelinov Tsonkov
- Date of birth: 25 June 1981 (age 45)
- Place of birth: Shumen, PR Bulgaria
- Height: 1.76 m (5 ft 9 in)
- Position: Midfielder

Team information
- Current team: Neftochimic Burgas
- Number: 22

Senior career*
Years	Team	Apps	(Gls)
2000–2004	Shumen		
2004–2006	Svetkavitsa	48	(6)
2006–2013	Chernomorets Burgas	122	(8)
2013	Neftochimic 1986	12	(1)
2014	PFC Burgas	26	(2)
2015	Chernomorets Burgas	11	(1)
2015–2017	Nesebar	51	(10)
2017	Oborishte	16	(0)
2018–	Neftochimic Burgas	53	(5)
- * Club domestic league appearances and goals as of 15 December 2019

Tsvetomir Tsonkov (Bulgarian: Цветомир Цонков; born 25 June 1981) is a Bulgarian footballer who plays as a midfielder for Neftochimic Burgas.

== Career ==
He started his career in Shumen before moving for PFC Svetkavitsa.

His contract with Chernomorets Burgas was mutually terminated in June 2013.

On 25 November 2013, Tsonkov opened the scoring for Neftochimic Burgas in an A PFG match against CSKA Sofia with a long distance effort; his goal was eventually recognized as the goal of the year.

In June 2017, Tsonkov signed with Oborishte.
