= Rumen Nikolov (footballer) =

Bulgarian footballer (born 1990)

Personal information
- Full name: Rumen Valeriev Nikolov
- Date of birth: 5 February 1990 (age 36)
- Place of birth: Varna, Bulgaria
- Height: 1.82 m (6 ft 0 in)
- Position: Forward

Team information
- Current team: Volov Shumen; Asparuhovo/Cherno More (youth coach)
- Number: 10

Youth career
- 1999–2005: Spartak Varna
- 2005–2008: Neftochimic
- 2009–2010: Cherno More

Senior career*
Years	Team	Apps	(Gls)
2010–2012	Cherno More	45	(8)
2012	Neftochimic 1986	10	(1)
2013	CD Mijas	9	(13)
2013–2014	Berliner AK 07	10	(1)
2014	Académica Lobito	–	(–)
2015–2016	MSV Pampow	31	(8)
2016	Chernomorets Balchik	14	(5)
2017	CD Mijas	7	(9)
2017–2019	Dobrudzha	35	(25)
2019–2020	Spartak Varna	30	(16)
2020	Volov Shumen	3	(2)
2020–2021	Chernomorets Balchik	12	(4)
2021	Sportist General Toshevo	4	(0)
2021	Svetkavitsa Targovishte	4	(0)
2022–2024	Septemvri Tervel	34	(23)
2024–2025	Aksakovo	14	(10)
2024–2025	Volov Shumen		

International career
2011	Bulgaria U21	2	(0)

Managerial career
- 2023–: Asparuhovo (youth coach)
- 2024–: Cherno More Varna (youth coach)
- * Club domestic league appearances and goals as of 08:03, 10 December 2024 (UTC)

Rumen Nikolov (Bulgarian: Румен Николов; born 5 February 1990) is a Bulgarian footballer who plays as a forward for Volov Shumen and coach at Asparuhovo academy, where he is one of the establishers.

== Career ==
In November 2009 Cherno More's manager Velizar Popov selected Nikolov for the main squad, and on 28 March 2010 he made his debut in the A PFG at the age of 20 against Minyor Pernik. He decided to wear number 90.

In August 2017 Nikolov joined Dobrudzha Dobrich.

In June 2023, Nikolov together with George Dobrev established an academy in Asparuhovo, Varna called FC Asparuhovo.

On 29 February 2024 he left Septemvri Tervel for Aksakovo.

== Career statistics ==
As of 1 June 2013

Club	Season	League		Cup		Europe		Total	
Club	Season	Apps	Goals	Apps	Goals	Apps	Goals	Apps	Goals
Cherno More	2009–10	9	1	0	0	–	–	9	1
Cherno More	2010–11	17	3	1	0	–	–	18	3
Cherno More	2011–12	19	4	1	0	–	–	20	4
Neftochimic Burgas	2012–13	10	1	3	0	–	–	13	1
CD Mijas	2012–13	9	13	0	0	–	–	9	13
Career totals		64	22	5	0	0	0	69	22
