= Todor Kolev (footballer, born 1989) =

Bulgarian footballer

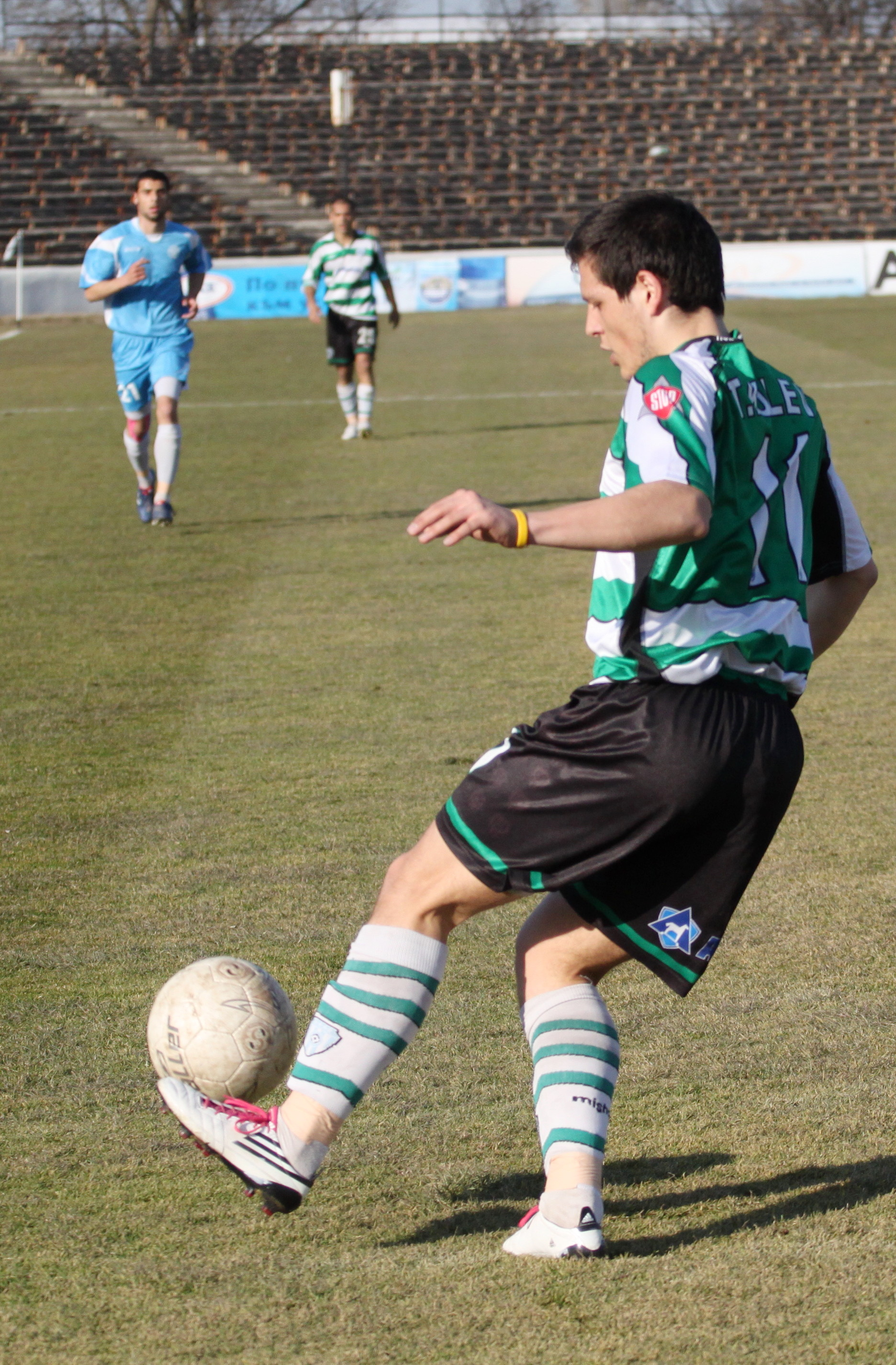

Personal information
- Full name: Todor Kolev Georgiev
- Date of birth: 22 September 1989 (age 37)
- Place of birth: Varna, Bulgaria
- Height: 1.75 m (5 ft 9 in)
- Positions: Left back; left winger

Youth career
- 1998–2008: Cherno More

Senior career*
Years	Team	Apps	(Gls)
2007–2011	Cherno More	46	(5)
2012	Vidima-Rakovski	9	(1)
2012–2013	Cherno More	5	(0)
2013–2014	Lyubimets 2007	11	(2)
2014	Kaliakra	9	(11)
2015	Marek	4	(0)
2015–2017	Dobrudzha Dobrich	51	(9)
2017–2018	Montana	26	(0)
2018–2019	Dobrudzha Dobrich	19	(2)

International career
- Bulgaria U19
2008–2009	Bulgaria U21		
- * Club domestic league appearances and goals

Todor Kolev (Bulgarian: Тодор Колев; born 22 September 1989) is a Bulgarian former footballer who played as a midfielder. He played as a left winger but could also play as a left back.

== Career ==
In September 2007 it was noticed that the Youth Academy forward Todor Kolev agreed the conditions of his first professional contract with the club which will be effective for five years. It was good news for the fans, because Todor he was expected as a great talent in the recent history of the club.

His first official match was on 9 December 2007 against Vidima-Rakovski Sevlievo. The result of the match was 7:0 with a win for Cherno More. In this day Kolev scored his first goal – in the 75th minute from a penalty kick for 6:0. The forward played 10 matches in 2007–08 and scored 2 goals.

On 30 June 2017, Kolev signed a 1-year contract with Montana. He left the club at the end of the season when his contract expired. In June 2018, Kolev returned to Dobrudzha Dobrich.

== International career ==
=== Bulgaria U19 ===
Kolev played for Bulgaria national under-19 football team. With the team he plays at 2008 UEFA European Under-19 Football Championship in Czech Republic.

=== Bulgaria U21 ===
In August 2008 the Bulgarian national under-21 coach Ivan Kolev called Todor up for Bulgaria national under-21 football team for qualified for 2009 UEFA European Under-21 Football Championship with Ireland U21 and Montenegro U21. On 5 September 2008 he made his official debut for Bulgaria U21 against Ireland U21. He played for 27 minutes. The result of the match was a 2:0 win for Bulgaria.
