= Dimitar Iliev (footballer, born 1986) =

Bulgarian footballer

Personal information
- Full name: Dimitar Vasilev Iliev
- Date of birth: 27 July 1986 (age 40)
- Place of birth: Kyustendil, Bulgaria
- Height: 1.86 m (6 ft 1 in)
- Positions: Defensive midfielder; centre back

Youth career
- Slavia Sofia

Senior career*
Years	Team	Apps	(Gls)
2007–2013	Montana	141	(5)
2013–2014	Pirin Blagoevgrad	25	(4)
2014	Marek	18	(0)
2015	Acharnaikos	14	(0)
2015–2016	Septemvri Simitli	21	(0)
2016–2017	Pelister	47	(0)
2018	Hebar	16	(0)
2018–2020	Montana	61	(1)
2020–2021	Marek	6	(1)
- * Club domestic league appearances and goals as of 2 November 2021

Dimitar Iliev (Bulgarian: Димитър Илиев; born 27 July 1986) is a Bulgarian professional footballer who plays as a midfielder.

== Career ==
In June 2018, Iliev signed with Montana.

== Honours ==
Pelister

- Macedonian Cup: 2016–17
