= Samuel Camazzola =

Brazilian footballer

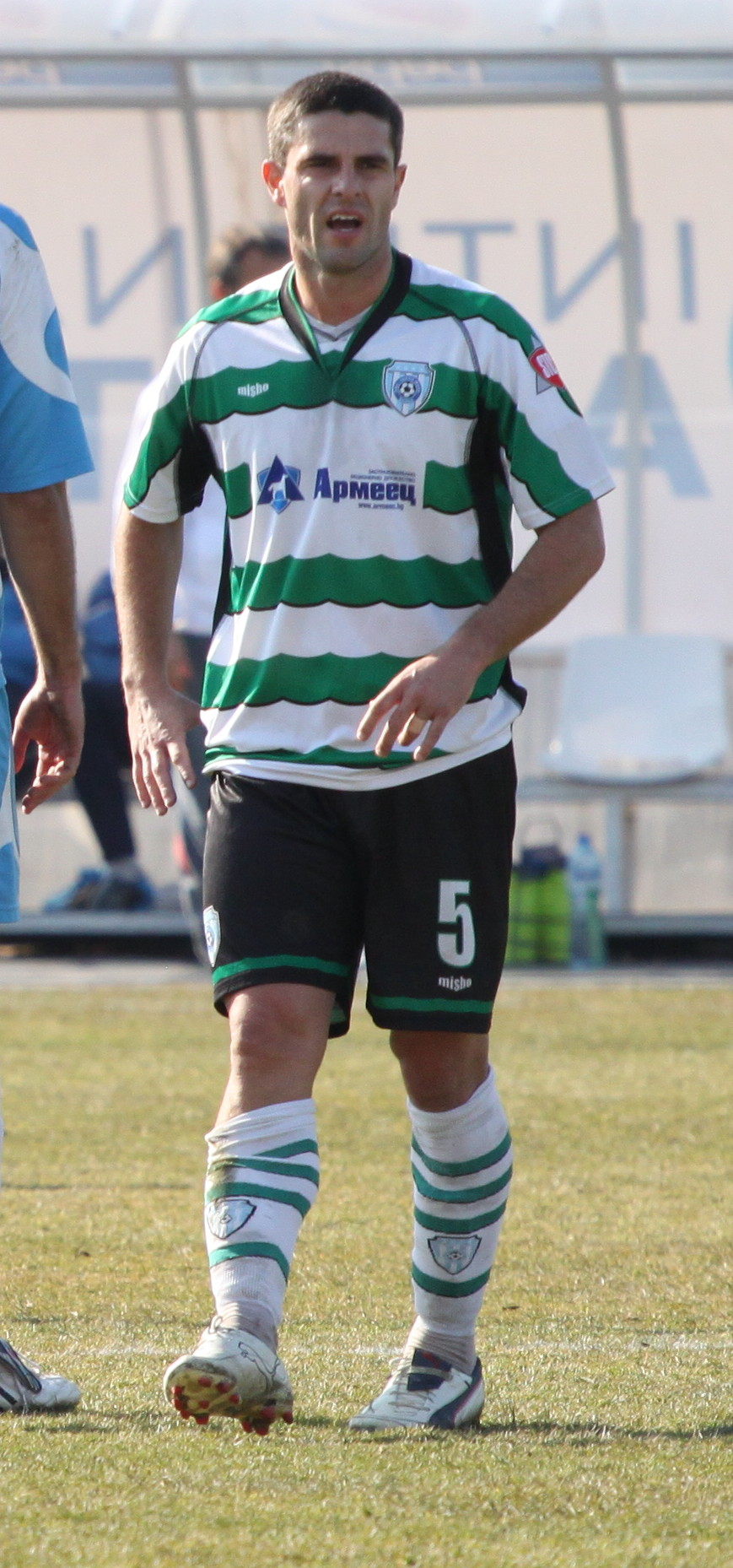
- Camazzola with Cherno More Varna

Personal information
- Full name
- Date of birth: 30 August 1982 (age 44)
- Place of birth: Caxias do Sul, Brazil
- Height: 1.79 m (5 ft 10 in)
- Position: Central midfielder

Senior career*
Years	Team	Apps	(Gls)
2001–2007	Juventude	71	(0)
2005–2006	→ Heart of Midlothian (loan)	8	(0)
2007	→ Châteauroux (loan)	3	(0)
2008–2010	Sandefjord Fotball	28	(3)
2010	→ Esportivo (loan)	14	(2)
2011–2013	Cherno More	61	(2)
- * Club domestic league appearances and goals

Samuel Camazzola (born 30 August 1982) is a Brazilian former professional footballer who played as a midfielder. He played 71 Série A games for Esporte Clube Juventude.

== Career ==
Camazzola was born in Caxias do Sul. He began his career with Juventude and was included in the first squad in 2001. He became a first-team regular early in the 2003 season.

After spending four years in the Juventude's senior team, on 31 August 2005, Camazzola joined the Scottish Premier League club Heart of Midlothian on a season-long loan deal. He made his debut on 17 September in a 1–0 away win against Inverness, coming on as a substitute for Jamie McAllister. However, Camazzola failed to find a stable place in the regular lineup, being featured mostly as a substitute, playing only eight league matches.

In January 2008, Camazzola joined Norwegian Adeccoligaen side Sandefjord Fotball. He made his debut on 20 April, in a 3–1 defeat away to Moss FK. Samuel came on at half time for Tommy Stenersen. He scored his first league goal for Sandefjord in a 2–0 home win against Sogndal Fotball on 21 May. During the season, Camazzola scored 3 goals in 18 matches, helping the club to promotion into the Tippeligaen. He made his Tippeligaen debut as he replaced Ørjan Røyrane in the 71st minute of their 2–0 away loss against Odd Grenland on 22 March 2009.

Camazzola signed for Bulgarian club Cherno More Varna on a two-year contract on 18 February 2011, making his debut in the 1–0 win over Pirin Blagoevgrad on 26 February. On 6 August 2011, he scored his first A PFG goal, in a 2–0 win over Montana on the opening day of the 2011–12 season at the Ticha Stadium. He left the team from Varna in the summer of 2013.
