= Marlon Fernández (footballer) =

Venezuelan footballer (born 1986)

Personal information
- Full name: Marlon Antonio Fernández Jiménez
- Date of birth: 16 January 1986 (age 40)
- Place of birth: San Cristóbal, Venezuela
- Height: 1.65 m (5 ft 5 in)
- Position: Midfielder

Team information
- Current team: Estudiantes de Mérida

Senior career*
Years	Team	Apps	(Gls)
2004–2010	Deportivo Táchira	151	(12)
2010–	Deportivo Lara	83	(10)
2012	→ Cherno More Varna (loan)	11	(1)
2013–2014	→ Deportes Antofagasta (loan)	22	(1)
2015	→ Deportivo Pasto	31	(5)
2016–2018	Carabobo	106	(10)
2019	Atlético Venezuela	20	(2)
2019–2022	Deportivo Táchira	91	(5)
2024–	Estudiantes de Mérida	26	(2)

International career
2009–	Venezuela	2	(0)
- * Club domestic league appearances and goals as of 2 August 2023

Marlon Antonio Fernández Jiménez (born 16 January 1986 in San Cristóbal) is a Venezuelan footballer who currently plays as a midfielder for Estudiantes de Mérida. In 2009, he was capped two times for the Venezuela national team.

== Career ==
=== Deportivo Táchira ===
Fernández began his career playing for Deportivo Táchira. In 2004, he was included in the Deportivo first-team squad. During his six years at Estadio Polideportivo de Pueblo Nuevo, he scored 12 goals in 151 matches. Marlon won the 2008 Venezuela League trophy with Deportivo.

On 17 April 2009, Fernández scored his first-ever Copa Libertadores goal, netting Deportivo's second in a 2–1 victory over the Paraguayan side Club Guaraní.

=== Deportivo Lara ===
In 2010 Fernández signed for Deportivo Lara. He made his debut on 8 August in a 1–0 home defeat against Zulia, coming on as a substitute for Pedro de Pablos. Ten days later, he assisted Aquiles Ocanto and Edwin Chalar in a 2–0 home win over Santa Fe in their 2010 Copa Sudamericana preliminary stage first leg tie. On 24 September, Fernández scored his first goal for Deportivo Lara in a 2–2 draw against Zamora. Marlon netted Lara's only goal in a 2–1 defeat at Deportivo Anzoátegui on 13 February 2011.

==== Cherno More Varna (loan) ====
On 3 January 2012, Cherno More Varna confirmed Fernández has joined on loan until the end of the season. He made his league debut on 4 March, in a 2–1 defeat to Levski Sofia. On 17 March, Marlon scored his first competitive goal for the club, scoring the match's only goal against Minyor Pernik.
