= Iliyan Kapitanov =

Bulgarian footballer

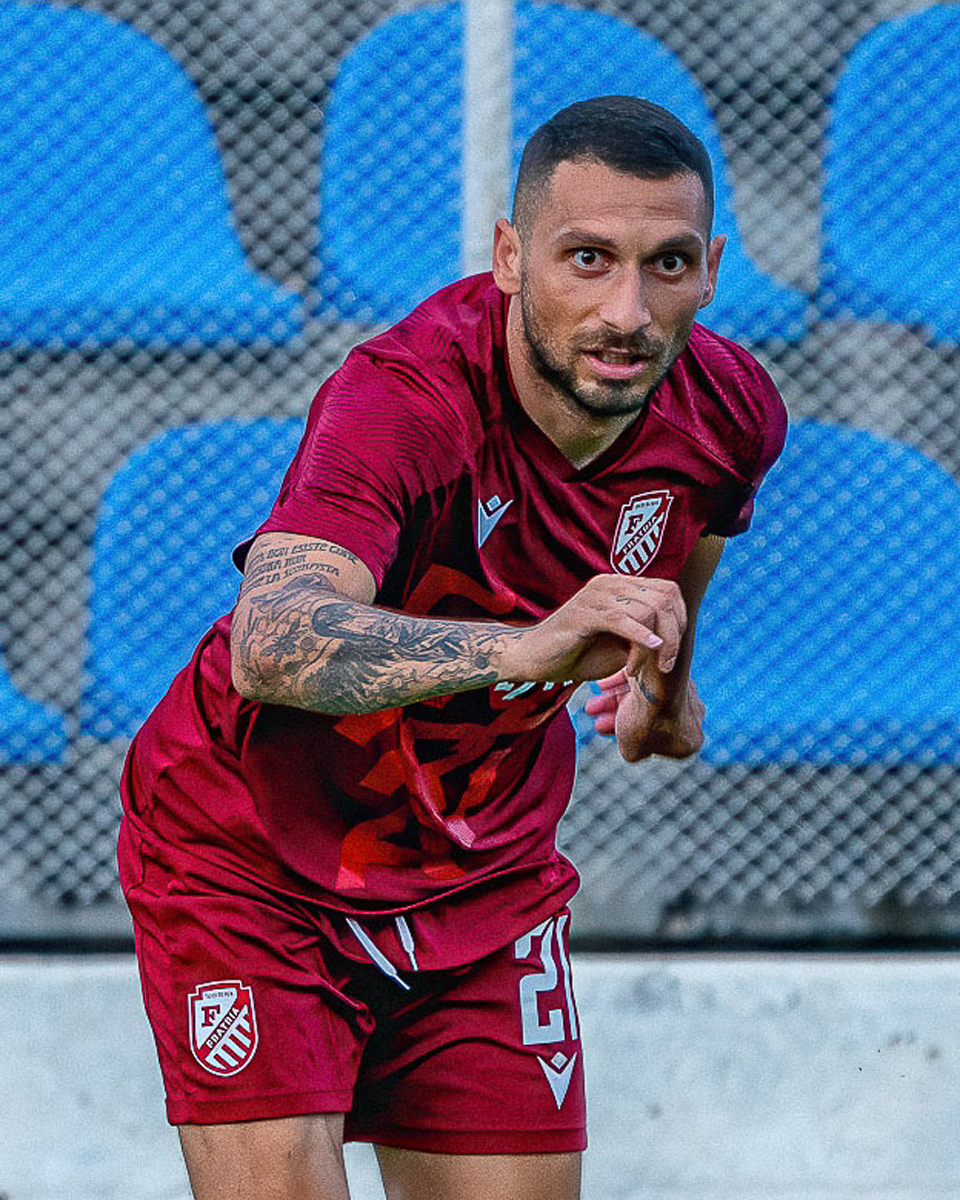
- Kapitanov playing for Fratria in 2024.

Personal information
- Full name: Iliyan Kirov Kapitanov
- Date of birth: 25 January 1992 (age 34)
- Place of birth: General Toshevo, Bulgaria
- Height: 1.83 m (6 ft 0 in)
- Position: Winger

Team information
- Current team: Fratria
- Number: 21

Youth career
- –2004: Sportist General Toshevo
- 2004–2011: Cherno More

Senior career*
Years	Team	Apps	(Gls)
2010–2013	Cherno More	35	(5)
2014	Lyubimets 2007	8	(0)
2014–2016	Sozopol	32	(5)
2016	Chernomorets Balchik	9	(4)
2017	Dobrudzha Dobrich		
2017	Botev Galabovo	17	(6)
2018	Oborishte	10	(2)
2018–2020	Litex Lovech	47	(10)
2020	Dobrudzha Dobrich	13	(3)
2021–2024	Litex Lovech	92	(27)
2024–	Fratria	66	(11)

International career
2010	Bulgaria U19		
2012	Bulgaria U21	2	(0)
- * Club domestic league appearances and goals as of 19:56, 27 September 2026 (UTC)

Iliyan Kapitanov (Bulgarian: Илиян Капитанов; born 25 January 1992) is a Bulgarian footballer who plays as a winger for Fratria.

== Career ==
=== Cherno More ===
In November 2009, Cherno More's manager Velizar Popov selected Ilian in the main squad and on 28 March 2010, Kapitanov made his debut in the A PFG at the age of 17 against Minyor Pernik, coming as a 61st min substitute.

=== Dobrudzha ===
In January 2017, Kapitanov joined Dobrudzha Dobrich.

=== Botev Galabovo ===
On 3 July 2017, Kapitanov signed with Botev Galabovo.

=== Litex ===
In June 2018, Kapitanov joined Litex.

== International career ==
Having previously been capped at Bulgaria under-17 level Kapitanov made his first appearance for the Bulgaria under-19 side on 30 March 2010 in a 0–1 loss against Finland under-19 in a friendly game in Pravets.
