= List of Bulgarian football transfers summer 2011 =

This is a list of Bulgarian football transfers in the summer transfer window 2011 by club. Only transfers of the A PFG are included.

== Beroe ==
In:

No.	Pos.	Nation	Player
3	DF	BUL	Vladimir Zafirov (from Etar Veliko Tarnovo)
6	DF	BUL	Yanko Valkanov (from (Belarus) Dinamo Minsk)
8	MF	BUL	Ivan Goranov (from Levski Sofia)
9	FW	BUL	Rangel Abushev (from Lokomotiv Plovdiv)
11	MF	BUL	Atanas Chipilov (from Montana)
21	MF	SRB	Slaven Stanković (from (Serbia) Zemun)
80	FW	BUL	Emil Angelov (from (Cyprus) Anorthosis Famagusta)
99	GK	BUL	Ivaylo Ivanov (Free agent)

Out:

No.	Pos.	Nation	Player
3	DF	BUL	Todor Todorov (to Neftochimic Burgas)
8	MF	BUL	Tsvetan Filipov (to Kaliakra Kavarna)
11	FW	BUL	Stoycho Mladenov (to Etar 1924)
12	GK	BUL	Plamen Petrov (released)
15	DF	BUL	Georgi Dinkov (on loan to Spartak Varna)
17	MF	BUL	Martin Raynov (on loan to Etar 1924)
20	MF	BUL	Nikolay Stankov (to Dobrudzha Dobrich)
21	MF	BUL	Todor Hristov (to Levski Sofia)
23	DF	BUL	Aleksandar Tomash (to Etar 1924)
29	MF	BUL	Ivo Gyurov (on loan to Etar 1924)
30	DF	BUL	Pavel Kovachev (to Kaliakra Kavarna)
32	FW	BRA	Romario (to Tundzha Yambol)

== Botev Vratsa ==
In:

No.	Pos.	Nation	Player
7	MF	BUL	Simeon Mechev (from Slavia Sofia)
10	FW	BUL	Branimir Kostadinov (from Chernomorets Burgas)
11	DF	BUL	Kiril Dinchev (from Akademik Sofia)
13	MF	BUL	Atanas Dimitrov (on loan from Litex Lovech)
16	DF	BUL	Martin Kovachev (from (Kazakhstan) Vostok)
18	DF	NGR	Victor Deniran (on loan from Slavia Sofia)
20	FW	BUL	Dimitar Georgiev (on loan from Litex Lovech)
25	DF	BUL	Trayan Trayanov (from Vidima-Rakovski)
27	GK	BUL	Pavel Stanev (from Nesebar)
30	MF	BRA	Neném (on loan from Litex Lovech)

Out:

No.	Pos.	Nation	Player
5	DF	BUL	Tsvetan Antov (to Malesh Mikrevo)
7	MF	BUL	Simeon Raykov (to Levski Sofia)
10	MF	BUL	Spas Bayraktarov (released)
11	MF	BUL	Nikolay Hadzhinikolov (to Bdin Vidin)
12	GK	BUL	Tsvetomir Tsankov (to Etar 1924)
16	DF	BUL	Emanuil Borisov (released)
20	FW	BUL	Emil Manolov (to Lokomotiv Mezdra)

== Cherno More ==
In:

No.	Pos.	Nation	Player
3	DF	BUL	Tsvetan Yotov (from Spartak Plovdiv)
9	FW	VEN	Hermes Palomino (from (Venezuela) Aragua)
18	DF	BUL	Ivelin Yanev (from Etar 1924)
19	MF	BUL	Hristian Popov (from Sliven 2000)
23	MF	BUL	Simeon Simeonov (from Dobrudzha Dobrich)
24	MF	BUL	Veselin Marchev (from Sliven 2000)

Out:

No.	Pos.	Nation	Player
2	FW	BUL	Vasil Tachev (to Dobrudzha Dobrich)
3	DF	BRA	Ademar Júnior (to CSKA Sofia)
4	DF	BUL	Radoslav Bachev (to Montana)
6	DF	BUL	Tanko Dyakov (to Lokomotiv Sofia)
9	FW	BUL	Miroslav Budinov (to Sportist Svoge)
12	DF	BRA	Marco Tiago (to (Portugal) Portimonense)
23	MF	BUL	Daniel Georgiev (to (Turkey) Orduspor)
77	FW	BUL	Vladimir Kaptiev (to Botev Kozloduy)
—	MF	BUL	Lyubomir Mihalev (on loan to Dobrudzha Dobrich)

== Chernomorets ==
In:

No.	Pos.	Nation	Player
33	GK	BUL	Yanko Georgiev (from Chernomorets Pomorie)
5	DF	BUL	Nikolay Nikolov (from Montana)
8	MF	BRA	Lourival Assis (from (Brazil) Botafogo SP)
9	MF	BUL	Dani Kiki (from Lokomotiv Plovdiv)
11	FW	BUL	Ventsislav Hristov (from Montana)
17	MF	BUL	Krum Stoyanov (from Chernomorets Pomorie)
19	FW	MAD	Anicet Andrianantenaina (from (France) Auxerre)
21	MF	BUL	Borislav Baldzhiyski (from Levski Sofia)
25	DF	BUL	Radostin Kishishev (from (England) Brighton & Hove Albion)
37	DF	FRA	Jérémy Faug-Porret (from (France) Strasbourg)
39	MF	ALG	Jugurtha Hamroun (from (France) EA Guingamp)

Out:

No.	Pos.	Nation	Player
6	DF	BUL	Orlin Starokin (to Levski Sofia)
7	MF	GER	Savio Nsereko (loan return to (Italy) Fiorentina)
8	MF	ITA	Alberto Quadri (to (Italy) Campobasso Calcio)
14	MF	POR	Ricardo André (released)
18	DF	GER	Jochen Seitz (to (Germany) Bayern Alzenau)
20	MF	ITA	Michele Cruciani (released)
21	FW	CGO	Lys Mouithys (to (Morocco) Wydad Casablanca)
23	DF	ISL	Josef Josefsson (released)
28	FW	BUL	Branimir Kostadinov (to Botev Vratsa)
31	DF	BRA	Gabriel Atz (released)
33	GK	GER	Pascal Borel (to (Germany) RB Leipzig)
39	FW	FRA	Moussa Koita (to (Cyprus) Olympiakos Nicosia)
83	MF	POR	Jaime Bragança (to (Indonesia) Jakarta FC)

== CSKA Sofia ==
In:

No.	Pos.	Nation	Player
2	DF	BUL	Pavel Vidanov (loan return from (Romania) Rapid București)
3	DF	BRA	Ademar Júnior (from Cherno More)
10	FW	BRA	Júnior Moraes (from (Ukraine) Metalurh Donetsk)
16	MF	BUL	Aleksandar Yakimov (from Pirin Blagoevgrad)
20	MF	BUL	Anton Karachanakov (from Pirin Blagoevgrad)
23	DF	BUL	Martin Dechev (loan return from Ludogorets Razgrad)
27	FW	ROU	Ianis Zicu (from (Romania) Poli Timișoara)
28	DF	SLO	Denis Halilović (from (Netherlands) Willem II)
66	DF	BUL	Plamen Krachunov (from Lokomotiv Plovdiv)
77	MF	SLO	Saša Živec (from (Slovenia) Primorje)
92	GK	ALG	Raïs M'Bolhi (on loan from (Russia) Krylia Sovetov)
—	DF	BUL	Aleksandar Dyulgerov (from Pirin Blagoevgrad)

Out:

No.	Pos.	Nation	Player
6	DF	ITA	Giuseppe Aquaro (to (Germany) Karlsruher SC)
10	MF	ARG	Lucas Trecarichi (released)
13	MF	BUL	Tomislav Kostadinov (on loan to Chavdar Etropole)
17	MF	BUL	Chetin Sadula (on loan to Kaliakra Kavarna)
21	MF	BUL	Kosta Yanev (to Lokomotiv Sofia)
23	MF	BUL	Emil Gargorov (to Ludogorets Razgrad)
24	MF	BUL	Aleksandar Tonev (to (Poland) Lech Poznań)
26	FW	IRL	Cillian Sheridan (on loan to (Scotland) St Johnstone)
28	MF	BRA	Marquinhos (to (Cyprus) Anorthosis Famagusta)
30	DF	ITA	Fabrizio Grillo (to (Italy) Crotone)
—	DF	BUL	Aleksandar Dyulgerov (on loan to Montana)
—	FW	BUL	Dimitar Iliev (to Montana)

== Kaliakra ==
In:

No.	Pos.	Nation	Player
6	DF	BUL	Pavel Kovachev (from Beroe Stara Zagora)
7	MF	BUL	Nikola Minkov (from Svilengrad)
9	FW	BUL	Iliyan Chavdarov (from Velbazhd Kyustendil)
10	MF	BUL	Dzuneit Yashar (from Nesebar)
11	MF	BUL	Tsvetan Filipov (from Beroe Stara Zagora)
12	GK	BUL	Hristo Bahtarliev (from Vihren Sandanski)
13	MF	BUL	Yulian Petkov (from Akademik Sofia)
16	FW	BUL	Ivan Tsachev (from Slavia Sofia)
19	MF	SVK	Jakub Hronec (on loan from Ludogorets Razgrad)
20	MF	BUL	Georgi Korudzhiev (from (Moldova) Zimbru Chişinău)
21	FW	BUL	Ivaylo Zafirov (from CSKA Sofia)
22	MF	BUL	Chetin Sadula (on loan from CSKA Sofia)
23	FW	BUL	Gerasim Zakov (from Vidima-Rakovski)

Out:

No.	Pos.	Nation	Player
1	GK	BUL	Dobrin Dobrev (retired)
3	DF	BUL	Martin Dimov (to Botev Plovdiv)
6	MF	GHA	Michael Tawiah (loan return to Levski Sofia)
7	MF	BUL	Lachezar Baltanov (loan return to Levski Sofia)
9	FW	BUL	Ivan Petkov (to Spartak Varna)
10	MF	BUL	Nikolay Petrov (to Svetkavitsa)
11	MF	BUL	Dian Kateliev (to Spartak Varna)
23	FW	BUL	Georgi Stanchev (to Spartak Varna)
29	GK	BUL	Yordan Gospodinov (to (Romania) Concordia Chiajna)
77	FW	BUL	Daniel Shmedin (loan return to Levski Sofia)

== Levski ==
In:

No.	Pos.	Nation	Player
6	DF	BUL	Orlin Starokin (from Chernomorets Burgas)
8	MF	ESP	Toni Calvo (from (Greece) Aris Thessaloniki)
9	FW	NED	Sjoerd Ars (from (Netherlands) Zwolle)
11	MF	BUL	Simeon Raykov (from Botev Vratsa)
19	FW	BUL	Ivan Tsvetkov (from Pirin Blagoevgrad)
20	DF	BUL	Aleksandar Bashliev (from Pirin Blagoevgrad)
21	MF	BUL	Todor Hristov (from Beroe Stara Zagora)
33	DF	SWE	Fredrik Risp (from (Denmark) Esbjerg)

Out:

No.	Pos.	Nation	Player
6	MF	BEL	Jeanvion Yulu-Matondo (to (Belgium) Westerlo)
7	MF	BUL	Aleksandar Aleksandrov (to Botev Plovdiv)
9	FW	MLI	Garra Dembélé (to (Germany) SC Freiburg)
14	DF	BUL	Veselin Minev (to (Turkey) Antalyaspor)
20	MF	BUL	Ivan Goranov (to Beroe Stara Zagora)
29	FW	BUL	Ismail Isa (to (Turkey) Karabükspor)
—	MF	BUL	Borislav Baldzhiyski (to Chernomorets Burgas)
—	MF	GHA	Michael Tawiah (to Chernomorets Burgas)

== Litex ==
In:

No.	Pos.	Nation	Player
1	GK	BUL	Vladislav Mitev (from Pirin Blagoevgrad)
5	DF	FRA	Bernard Itoua (from (France) Auxerre)
6	DF	FRA	Maxime Josse (from (France) Sochaux)
11	FW	BRA	Thiago Miracema (on loan from (Brazil) Sampaio Corrêa)
12	FW	BRA	Célio Codó (on loan from (Brazil) Sampaio Corrêa)
15	MF	URU	Robert Flores (from (Spain) Villarreal B)

Out:

No.	Pos.	Nation	Player
1	GK	SRB	Uroš Golubović (to Ludogorets Razgrad)
2	DF	FRA	Alexandre Barthe (to Ludogorets Razgrad)
4	DF	BIH	Džemal Berberović (to (Germany) MSV Duisburg)
5	DF	BUL	Mihail Venkov (to Lokomotiv Plovdiv)
6	DF	BUL	Ivaylo Petkov (released)
11	FW	SEN	Pape Diouf (loan return to (Senegal) Dakar UC)
15	MF	BRA	Doka Madureira (to (Turkey) İstanbul B.B.)
20	MF	BRA	Neném (on loan to Botev Vratsa)

== Lokomotiv Plovdiv ==
In:

No.	Pos.	Nation	Player
1	GK	SLO	Dino Seremet (from (Greece) Doxa Drama)
4	DF	BUL	Mihail Venkov (from Litex Lovech)
9	FW	CRO	Dario Zahora (from (Croatia) Lokomotiva)
15	DF	ARG	Juan Compagnucci (from (Argentina) Sportivo Belgrano)
23	MF	BUL	Daniel Georgiev (from (Turkey) Orduspor)
24	DF	BUL	Atanas Ribarski (from Zagorets)
25	DF	BUL	Angel Yoshev (from Minyor Pernik)
40	GK	BUL	Dimitar Grabchev (loan return from Pirin Gotse Delchev)
87	MF	BRA	Dakson (from (Brazil) Campo Grande)
—	FW	SRB	Miloš Reljić (from (Serbia) Red Star Belgrade)

Out:

No.	Pos.	Nation	Player
6	DF	BUL	Plamen Krachunov (to CSKA Sofia)
9	MF	BUL	Dani Kiki (to Chernomorets Burgas)
11	FW	BUL	Rangel Abushev (to Beroe Stara Zagora)
17	DF	SRB	Bojan Dojkić (to (Serbia) Radnički Niš)
22	FW	FRA	Dimitri Durand (released)
24	DF	FRA	Samir Bengelloun (released)
28	GK	BUL	Todor Todorov (to Dorostol Silistra)
80	MF	HUN	Gábor Erős (to (Greece) Doxa Drama)
99	FW	URU	Nicolás Raimondi (released)

== Lokomotiv Sofia ==
In:

No.	Pos.	Nation	Player
5	DF	BUL	Tanko Dyakov (from Cherno More)
7	MF	BUL	Vasil Velev (from Vidima-Rakovski)
21	MF	BUL	Kosta Yanev (from CSKA Sofia)
31	MF	BUL	Dimitar Telkiyski (from (Israel) Hapoel Ramat Gan)
32	MF	BUL	Lyubomir Bozhinov (from Chernomorets Pomorie)
83	MF	SUI	Baykal Kulaksızoğlu (from (Turkey) Karşıyaka)
99	FW	BIH	Mirza Mešić (from (Slovenia) Rudar Velenje)

Out:

No.	Pos.	Nation	Player
5	DF	BUL	Georgi Markov (retired)
7	FW	USA	Jemal Johnson (to (England) Southend United)
8	MF	BUL	Svetoslav Dyakov (to Ludogorets Razgrad)
17	DF	BUL	Ivaylo Dimitrov (to Botev Plovdiv)
77	MF	MAR	Youssef Idrissi (released)
99	FW	BUL	Dormushali Saidhodzha (to (Cyprus) APOP Kinyras)

== Ludogorets ==
In:

No.	Pos.	Nation	Player
1	GK	SRB	Uroš Golubović (from Litex Lovech)
3	DF	SVK	Marián Jarabica (on loan from (Poland) Cracovia)
4	DF	SLO	Jure Travner (from (Scotland) St Mirren)
5	DF	FRA	Alexandre Barthe (from Litex Lovech)
8	MF	BUL	Stanislav Genchev (from (Romania) Vaslui)
11	FW	BRA	Juninho Quixadá (from (Brazil) Bragantino)
17	DF	ARG	Franco Bano (from (Uruguay) Miramar Misiones)
18	MF	BUL	Svetoslav Dyakov (from Lokomotiv Sofia)
19	MF	BUL	Dimo Bakalov (from Sliven 2000)
23	MF	BUL	Emil Gargorov (from CSKA Sofia)
25	DF	BUL	Yordan Minev (from Botev Plovdiv)
27	FW	BEL	Christian Kabasele (from (Belgium) Eupen)
30	GK	BUL	Hristo Nikolov (from Dorostol Silistra)
33	DF	SVK	Ľubomír Guldan (from (Slovakia) MŠK Žilina)
73	FW	BUL	Ivan Stoyanov (from (Russia) Alania Vladikavkaz)
77	DF	SLO	Suvad Grabus (from (Bosnia and Herzegovina) Travnik)
84	MF	BRA	Marcelinho (from (Brazil) Bragantino)
—	MF	SVK	Jakub Hronec (from (England) Birmingham City)

Out:

No.	Pos.	Nation	Player
3	DF	BUL	Daniel Gramatikov (loan return to Cherno More)
4	DF	BUL	Atanas Drenovichki (loan return to Slavia Sofia)
5	DF	BUL	Zheko Yordanov (to Dimitrovgrad)
7	FW	MKD	Zoran Zlatkovski (to (Iran) Malavan)
8	MF	BUL	Radoslav Anev (to Etar 1924)
9	FW	BUL	Antonio Pavlov (to (Israel) Hapoel Jerusalem)
11	MF	BUL	Diyan Dimov (to Svetkavitsa)
16	MF	BUL	Syuleiman Shakirov (Dunav Ruse)
18	DF	BUL	Stanislav Zhekov (to (Indonesia) Pelita Jaya)
23	GK	BUL	Miroslav Grigorov (to Nesebar)
26	DF	BUL	Radoslav Komitov (to Svetkavitsa)
27	DF	BUL	Martin Dechev (loan return to CSKA Sofia)
30	DF	BUL	Ventsislav Yordanov (to Svetkavitsa)
33	DF	BUL	Georgi Georgiev (to Svetkavitsa)
—	MF	SVK	Jakub Hronec (on loan to Kaliakra Kavarna)

== Minyor ==
In:

No.	Pos.	Nation	Player
3	DF	BUL	Ivan Mihov (from Pirin Blagoevgrad)
15	MF	NGR	Salas Okechukwu (from Oborishte Panagyurishte)
16	MF	BUL	Kostadin Katsimerski (from Pirin Blagoevgrad)
59	FW	BUL	Ventsislav Ivanov (from (Cyprus) AEP Paphos)
76	FW	BUL	Krum Bibishkov (from Pirin Blagoevgrad)

Out:

No.	Pos.	Nation	Player
3	DF	BUL	Adrian Olegov (released)
6	DF	BUL	Daniel Zlatkov (to Slavia Sofia)
8	MF	BUL	Samir Aess (to Bansko)
18	MF	SRB	Goran Janković (to (Serbia) Donji Srem Pećinci)
26	DF	BUL	Angel Yoshev (to Lokomotiv Plovdiv)
30	FW	BUL	Miroslav Petrov (released)
88	MF	CZE	Tomáš Okleštěk (to (Czech Republic) 1. SC Znojmo)

== Montana ==
In:

No.	Pos.	Nation	Player
3	DF	BUL	Emil Koparanov (from Chernomorets Pomorie)
4	DF	BUL	Radoslav Bachev (from Cherno More)
5	DF	BUL	Dimitar Koemdzhiev (from Pirin Blagoevgrad)
10	FW	BUL	Dimitar Vodenicharov (from Pirin Blagoevgrad)
11	DF	BUL	Aleksandar Dyulgerov (on loan from CSKA Sofia)
12	GK	BUL	Atanas Arshinkov (from Pirin Blagoevgrad)
17	FW	BUL	Dimitar Iliev (from CSKA Sofia)
18	MF	BUL	Yanko Sandanski (from Pirin Blagoevgrad)
19	FW	BUL	Boris Kondev (from (Azerbaijan) Turan Tovuz)
20	MF	BUL	Nikolay Chipev (from (Malta) Ħamrun Spartans)

Out:

No.	Pos.	Nation	Player
4	DF	SEN	Moussa Gueye (released)
5	MF	BUL	Ahmed Hikmet (to Vidima-Rakovski)
10	FW	BUL	Ventsislav Hristov (to Chernomorets Burgas)
11	FW	BUL	Atanas Chipilov (to Beroe Stara Zagora)
17	DF	BUL	Nikolay Nikolov (to Chernomorets Burgas)
18	DF	BUL	Atanas Fidanin (released)
19	MF	BUL	Ventsislav Aldev (released)
20	MF	BRA	Anderson (released)
23	GK	BUL	Yulian Levashki (released)

== Slavia ==
In:

No.	Pos.	Nation	Player
2	MF	BRA	Tom (from (Brazil) Grêmio Maringá)
4	DF	BUL	Atanas Drenovichki (loan return from Ludogorets)
6	DF	BUL	Daniel Zlatkov (from Minyor Pernik)
8	MF	BUL	Atanas Bornosuzov (from (Israel) Bnei Sakhnin)
19	DF	BUL	Zhivko Zhelev (from (Azerbaijan) Simurq)
24	MF	BUL	Maksim Stoykov (from Brestnik 1948)
26	DF	BUL	Yulian Popev (from Pirin Blagoevgrad)
28	MF	BRA	Eli Marques (from (Cyprus) AEL Limassol)
33	MF	BUL	Galin Ivanov (loan return from (Germany) Arminia Bielefeld)
—	DF	BUL	Ivan Todorov (from Chernomorets Pomorie)

Out:

No.	Pos.	Nation	Player
4	DF	BRA	Josias Basso (to (Portugal) U.D. Leiria)
6	DF	BUL	Martin Sechkov (to Etar 1924)
9	FW	BUL	Georgi Hristov (on loan to (Israel) Ashdod)
11	FW	NGR	Ortega Deniran (released)
19	FW	BUL	Martin Kushev (retired)
22	DF	BUL	Victor Genev (on loan to (Russia) Krylia Sovetov)
24	FW	BUL	Ivan Tsachev (to Kaliakra Kavarna)
25	DF	NGR	Victor Deniran (on loan to Botev Vratsa)
27	MF	ISR	Tom Mansharov (to (Israel) Maccabi Tel Aviv)
33	MF	BRA	Baiano (released)
—	DF	BUL	Ivan Todorov (on loan to Vidima-Rakovski)

== Svetkavitsa ==
In:

No.	Pos.	Nation	Player
2	DF	BUL	Martin Dimov (from Etar 1924)
3	DF	BUL	Georgi Georgiev (from Ludogorets Razgrad)
5	DF	BUL	Ventsislav Marinov (from Dorostol Silistra)
8	FW	BUL	Martin Hristov (from Chernomorets Balchik)
9	FW	BUL	Tihomir Kanev (from Etar 1924)
14	MF	BUL	Nikolay Petrov (from Kaliakra Kavarna)
16	MF	EGY	Islam Magdy (from (Egypt) Al-Ahly B)
18	MF	BUL	Anton Kostadinov (from Pirin Blagoevgrad)
19	FW	EGY	Mohamed Tawakol (from (Egypt) Ismaily)
20	MF	BUL	Diyan Dimov (from Ludogorets Razgrad)
21	DF	BUL	Emil Martinov (on loan from Slavia Sofia)
22	MF	EGY	Mahmoud Abdelaati
23	DF	BUL	Ventsislav Yordanov (from Ludogorets Razgrad)
24	DF	BUL	Ignat Damyanov (from Dorostol Silistra)
26	DF	BUL	Radoslav Komitov (from Ludogorets Razgrad)
88	GK	BUL	Aleksandar Dimov (from Dorostol Silistra)

Out:

No.	Pos.	Nation	Player
5	DF	BUL	Ivaylo Rusev (to Etar 1924)
9	FW	BUL	Nikolay Valev (released)
16	MF	BUL	Miroslav Velikov (released)
18	DF	BUL	Maksim Nedev (to Shumen 2010)
19	FW	BUL	Hristo Aleksandrov (to Shumen 2010)
20	DF	BUL	Kaloyan Nikolov (released)
88	MF	BUL	Nikola Nikolov (to Pirin Gotse Delchev)
89	MF	BUL	Stefan Lachov (to Chavdar Byala Slatina)

== Vidima-Rakovski ==
In:

No.	Pos.	Nation	Player
2	DF	BUL	Ivan Todorov (on loan from Slavia Sofia)
9	FW	BUL	Veselin Stoykov (from Pirin Blagoevgrad)
11	FW	BUL	Georgi Kakalov (from Pirin Blagoevgrad)
13	MF	BUL	Ahmed Hikmet (from Montana)
14	MF	BUL	Ruslan Ivanov (from Pirin Blagoevgrad)
21	DF	BUL	Radoslav Mitrevski (from Pirin Blagoevgrad)
24	MF	BUL	Ventsislav Bengyuzov (on loan from Litex Lovech)

Out:

No.	Pos.	Nation	Player
4	DF	BUL	Borislav Gyulemetov (released)
7	MF	BUL	Vasil Velev (to Lokomotiv Sofia)
9	FW	BUL	Nikolay Vladinov (released)
11	MF	BUL	Vladimir Vladimirov (released)
14	DF	BUL	Ivan Skerlev (released)
16	GK	BUL	Dimitar Pantev (released)
17	DF	BUL	Kalin Shtarkov (loan return to Levski Sofia)
18	FW	BUL	Lyubomir Velichkov (released)
21	MF	BUL	Nikolay Tsvetkov (to Bdin Vidin)
23	MF	BUL	Stanislav Ivanov (released)
35	DF	BUL	Trayan Trayanov (to Botev Vratsa)

== See also ==
- (Cyprus) List of Cypriot football transfers summer 2011
- (Netherlands) List of Dutch football transfers summer 2011
- (England) List of English football transfers summer 2011
- (Malta) List of Maltese football transfers summer 2011
- (Germany) List of German football transfers summer 2011
- (Greece) List of Greek football transfers summer 2011
- (Portugal) List of Portuguese football transfers summer 2011
- (Spain) List of Spanish football transfers summer 2011
- (Latvia) List of Latvian football transfers summer 2011
- (Serbia) List of Serbian football transfers summer 2011
