= List of Bulgarian football transfers winter 2011–12 =

The following are lists of Bulgarian football transfers that happened in the winter between 2011 and 2012. They are listed by team.

== Beroe ==
In:

No.	Pos.	Nation	Player
6	MF	NGA	Richard Eromoigbe (from (Cyprus) Alki Larnaca)
12	GK	BUL	Kiril Akalski (from Levski Sofia)
13	DF	BUL	Dimitar Vezalov (from Lyubimetz 2007)
17	MF	BUL	Iskren Pisarov (from Lokomotiv Sofia)
18	DF	CMR	Dieudonné Owona (from (France) Grande-Synthe)
21	MF	BRA	Elias (from (Cyprus) Ermis Aradippou)
23	MF	BUL	Todor Hristov (from Levski Sofia)
29	FW	BUL	Georgi Andonov (from Chernomorets Burgas)
55	DF	BUL	Martin Kavdanski (from Lokomotiv Plovdiv)
77	MF	POR	Fernando Livramento (from (Portugal) Chaves)
88	MF	POR	David Caiado (from (Cyprus) Olympiakos Nicosia)

Out:

No.	Pos.	Nation	Player
6	DF	BUL	Yanko Valkanov (to (Kazakhstan) Akzhayik)
10	MF	BUL	Dian Genchev (to Nesebar)
12	GK	BUL	Miroslav Radev (released)
14	FW	BUL	Evgeni Yordanov (released)
18	MF	BUL	Petar Kostadinov (retired)
19	FW	BUL	Vladislav Zlatinov (to Slavia Sofia)
21	MF	SRB	Slaven Stanković (to (Serbia) Napredak Kruševac)
29	MF	BUL	Ivo Gyurov (released)
88	MF	BUL	Petar Dimitrov (to Slavia Sofia)

== Botev Vratsa ==
In:

No.	Pos.	Nation	Player
7	DF	BUL	Anton Petrov (from Kaliakra Kavarna)
11	MF	BUL	Iliya Iliev (from Slavia Sofia)
13	MF	BUL	Nikolay Marinov (from Akademik Sofia)
20	MF	BUL	Konstantin Mirchev (from (Cyprus) Onisilos Sotira)
21	MF	BUL	Ivaylo Radentsov (from Kaliakra Kavarna)
24	FW	BUL	Nikolay Vladinov (from (Switzerland) Le Mont)
25	MF	BUL	Mihail Petrov (from Dorostol Silistra)
27	FW	BUL	Rumen Rangelov (from Minyor Pernik)
29	DF	SRB	Darko Savić (from Lokomotiv Sofia)
30	MF	BUL	Lachezar Baltanov (on loan from Levski Sofia)

Out:

No.	Pos.	Nation	Player
7	MF	BUL	Simeon Mechev (released)
11	DF	BUL	Kiril Dinchev (to Litex Lovech)
13	MF	BUL	Atanas Dimitrov (loan return to Litex Lovech)
18	DF	NGA	Victor Deniran (loan return to Slavia Sofia)
20	MF	BUL	Dimitar Georgiev (loan return to Litex Lovech)
25	DF	BUL	Trayan Trayanov (to Slivnishki geroi)
27	GK	BUL	Pavel Stanev (to Neftochimic Burgas)
29	FW	BUL	Kiril Mihaylov (released)
30	MF	BRA	Neném (loan return to Litex Lovech)

== Cherno More ==
In:

No.	Pos.	Nation	Player
22	GK	BUL	Plamen Kolev (from Vidima-Rakovski)
86	MF	VEN	Marlon Fernández (on loan from (Venezuela) Deportivo Lara)
91	DF	BUL	Zhivko Atanasov (from Levski Sofia)

Out:

No.	Pos.	Nation	Player
7	MF	BUL	Stanislav Stoyanov (retired)
11	MF	BUL	Todor Kolev (to Vidima-Rakovski)
16	MF	BUL	Dimitar Petkov (to Bdin Vidin)
24	MF	BUL	Veselin Marchev (to (Poland) Flota Świnoujście)
26	GK	BUL	Ilko Pirgov (to Litex Lovech)
27	MF	EST	Daniil Ratnikov (to (Estonia) Tallinna Kalev)

== Chernomorets Burgas ==
In:

No.	Pos.	Nation	Player
7	FW	ARM	Samvel Melkonyan (from (Armenia) Banants Yerevan)
9	FW	BUL	Preslav Yordanov (from Lokomotiv Sofia)
14	MF	BUL	Plamen Dimov (from Chernomorets Pomorie)
31	MF	BUL	Dimitar Telkiyski (from Lokomotiv Sofia)
92	MF	MAR	Aatif Chahechouhe (from (France) Nancy)
93	DF	COD	Christopher Oualembo (from (Italy) Monza Brianza)
94	FW	CIV	Yannick Boli (from (France) Nîmes Olympique)

Out:

No.	Pos.	Nation	Player
3	DF	BUL	Ventsislav Bonev (to Botev Plovdiv)
4	DF	TUN	Enis Hajri (to (China) Henan Construction)
7	FW	BUL	Georgi Andonov (to Beroe Stara Zagora)
9	MF	BUL	Dani Kiki (released)
13	FW	BUL	Martin Toshev (to Slavia Sofia)
39	MF	ALG	Jugurtha Hamroun (to (Turkey) Karabükspor)
77	MF	BUL	Plamen Krumov (to (Romania) Concordia Chiajna)

== CSKA Sofia ==
In:

No.	Pos.	Nation	Player
7	MF	ESP	Antonio Tomás (from (Spain) Zaragoza)
9	FW	EQG	Iván Bolado (from (Spain) Cartagena)
21	MF	BUL	Kosta Yanev (from Lokomotiv Sofia)
24	DF	NED	Ilias Haddad (from (Scotland) St Mirren)
26	MF	BUL	Nikolay Dyulgerov (from Ludogorets Razgrad)
32	FW	ROU	Georgian Păun (on loan from (Romania) Dinamo București)
99	MF	CMR	Njongo Priso (from (Cyprus) AEK Larnaca)

Out:

No.	Pos.	Nation	Player
2	DF	BUL	Pavel Vidanov (to (Poland) Zagłębie Lubin)
7	FW	BUL	Spas Delev (to (Turkey) Mersin)
9	FW	BRA	Michel Platini (to (Romania) Dinamo București)
12	GK	BUL	Ivan Karadzhov (to Lokomotiv Plovdiv)
27	MF	ROU	Ianis Zicu (to (South Korea) Pohang Steelers)
28	DF	SVN	Denis Halilović (to (Slovenia) Domžale)
29	MF	NED	Gregory Nelson (to (Ukraine) Metalurh Donetsk)
77	MF	SVN	Saša Živec (to (Slovenia) Domžale)
—	MF	BUL	Tomi Kostadinov (to Litex, previously on loan at Chavdar Etropole)

== Kaliakra Kavarna ==
In:

No.	Pos.	Nation	Player
8	DF	BUL	Darin Andonov (Free agent)
13	MF	LBR	George Weah Jr (from (Switzerland) Baden)
15	MF	BUL	Ivelin Kostov (from Sliven 2000)
21	DF	BUL	Angel Madzhirov (from Pirin Gotse Delchev)
33	GK	BUL	Miroslav Grigorov (from Nesebar)

Out:

No.	Pos.	Nation	Player
5	DF	BUL	Anton Dimitrov (to Dobrudzha Dobrich)
7	MF	BUL	Nikola Minkov (to Akademik Sofia)
8	MF	BUL	Ivaylo Radentsov (to Botev Vratsa)
12	GK	BUL	Hristo Bahtarliev (released)
13	MF	BUL	Yulian Petkov (to Lokomotiv Sofia)
15	DF	BUL	Anton Petrov (to Botev Vratsa)
18	MF	SVK	Jakub Hronec (loan return to Ludogorets Razgrad)

== Levski Sofia ==
In:

No.	Pos.	Nation	Player
12	FW	BRA	Jose Junior (on loan from Slavia Sofia)
16	MF	POR	Cristovão (from (Cyprus) Anorthosis)
25	DF	MLI	Souleymane Diamoutene (from (Italy) Lecce)
28	DF	POR	Nuno Pinto (from (Portugal) Nacional)

Out:

No.	Pos.	Nation	Player
9	FW	NED	Sjoerd Ars (on loan to (China) Tianjin Teda)
14	DF	MNE	Marko Vidović (to (Hungary) Budapest Honvéd)
16	MF	BUL	Marian Ognyanov (to Botev Plovdiv)
21	MF	BUL	Todor Hristov (to Beroe Stara Zagora)
30	MF	BUL	Lachezar Baltanov (on loan to Botev Vratsa)
33	DF	SWE	Lars Risp (to (Cyprus) Ethnikos Achna)
85	GK	BUL	Kiril Akalski (to Beroe Stara Zagora)
22	MF	MKD	Darko Tasevski (to Hapoel Ironi Kiryat Shmona)

== Litex Lovech ==
In:

No.	Pos.	Nation	Player
1	GK	BUL	Ilko Pirgov (from Cherno More)
2	DF	BUL	Kiril Dinchev (from Botev Vratsa)
4	DF	BUL	Vasil Bozhikov (from Minyor Pernik)
14	MF	ALB	Armando Vajushi (from (Albania) Vllaznia Shkodër)
15	MF	BUL	Tomislav Kostadinov (from CSKA Sofia)
24	FW	BUL	Borislav Borisov (from Bdin Vidin)
77	MF	BUL	Galin Ivanov (from Slavia Sofia)
99	FW	BRA	Marcelo Nicácio (from (Brazil) Ceará)

Out:

No.	Pos.	Nation	Player
1	GK	BUL	Vladislav Mitev (to Chavdar Etropole)
8	MF	BRA	Tom (to (Turkey) Istanbul B.B.)
12	FW	BRA	Célio Codó (loan return to (Brazil) Sampaio Corrêa)
14	FW	SVN	Dejan Djermanović (to (Slovenia) Olimpija Ljubljana)
15	MF	URU	Robert Flores (to (Chile) Palestino)
22	DF	BUL	Plamen Nikolov (on loan to (Russia) Tom Tomsk)
24	FW	BUL	Borislav Borisov (on loan to Montana)
31	GK	BRA	Vinícius Barrivieira (loan return to (Brazil) Atlético Paranaense)
—	MF	BRA	Neném (to (Brazil) AC Juventus, previously on loan at Botev Vratsa)
—	MF	BUL	Ventsislav Bengyuzov (to Pirin, previously on loan at Vidima-Rakovski)

== Lokomotiv Plovdiv ==
In:

No.	Pos.	Nation	Player
6	DF	BUL	Tanko Dyakov (from Lokomotiv Sofia)
9	FW	BUL	Lyubomir Tsekov (from Svilengrad 1921)
11	MF	BUL	Ilian Yordanov (from Lyubimetz 2007)
12	GK	BUL	Ivan Karadzhov (from CSKA Sofia)
30	GK	LVA	Andrejs Pavlovs (from (Cyprus) Olympiakos Nicosia)
71	FW	BUL	Hristo Spasov (from Hebar Pazardzhik)
89	MF	BUL	Stanislav Malamov (from Rakovski 2011)

Out:

No.	Pos.	Nation	Player
1	GK	BUL	Dimitar Grabchev (to Svilengrad 1921)
9	FW	SRB	Miloš Reljić (released)
15	DF	ARG	Juan Compagnucci (released)
24	DF	BUL	Atanas Ribarski (to Botev Galabovo)
55	DF	BUL	Martin Kavdanski (to Beroe Stara Zagora)

== Lokomotiv Sofia ==
In:

No.	Pos.	Nation	Player
2	DF	BUL	Kostadin Velkov (from Chernomorets Pomorie)
6	DF	BUL	Aleksandar Branekov (from Vidima-Rakovski)
9	FW	BUL	Antonio Pavlov (from (Israel) Hapoel Jerusalem)
13	MF	BUL	Yulian Petkov (from Kaliakra Kavarna)
16	MF	BUL	Martin Dimitrov (from Chernomorets Pomorie)
17	FW	BUL	Vladimir Manchev (Free agent)
18	MF	BUL	Miroslav Koev (from Chernomorets Pomorie)
20	MF	SRB	Vladimir Bogdanović (from (China) Liaoning Whowin)
21	MF	BUL	Aleksandar Mladenov (from Etar 1924)
22	MF	BUL	Pavel Petkov (from Bansko)
29	FW	BUL	Boris Kondev (from Montana)
32	MF	BUL	Svetoslav Petrov (from Sliven 2000)
33	GK	BUL	Emil Mihaylov (from Ludogorets Razgrad)
77	MF	BUL	Daniel Peev (from Slavia Sofia)
79	FW	BUL	Andrey Atanasov (from Chernomorets Pomorie)
88	MF	BUL	Atanas Bornosuzov (from Slavia Sofia)
90	MF	BUL	Mladen Stoev (from Sportist Svoge)

Out:

No.	Pos.	Nation	Player
5	DF	BUL	Tanko Dyakov (to Lokomotiv Plovdiv)
8	MF	BUL	Vladislav Romanov (to Slavia Sofia)
9	FW	BUL	Preslav Yordanov (to Chernomorets Burgas)
12	DF	SRB	Darko Savić (to Botev Vratsa)
14	DF	BUL	Milen Lahchev (to (Romania) Concordia Chiajna)
16	MF	BUL	Iskren Pisarov (to Beroe Stara Zagora)
17	MF	BUL	Nikola Vasev (released)
21	MF	BUL	Kosta Yanev (to CSKA Sofia)
22	GK	BUL	Boyan Peykov (released)
28	DF	BUL	Atanas Atanasov (to Spartak Pleven)
31	MF	BUL	Dimitar Telkiyski (to Chernomorets Burgas)
32	MF	BUL	Lyubomir Bozhinov (to Neftochimic Burgas)
83	MF	SUI	Baykal Kulaksızoğlu (released)
88	MF	BUL	Rumen Goranov (released)
99	FW	BIH	Mirza Mešić (released)

== Ludogorets Razgrad ==
In:

No.	Pos.	Nation	Player
4	DF	FIN	Tero Mäntylä (from (Finland) Inter Turku)
6	MF	BUL	Georgi Kostadinov (from Chernomorets Pomorie)
13	GK	CZE	Radek Petr (from (Belgium) Eupen)
30	GK	BUL	Georgi Argilashki (from Brestnik 1948)
36	MF	MNE	Mladen Kašćelan (on loan from (Poland) Jagiellonia)
37	MF	SVK	Jakub Hronec (loan return from Kaliakra Kavarna)
77	DF	POR	Vitinha (from (Romania) Concordia Chiajna)

Out:

No.	Pos.	Nation	Player
4	DF	SVN	Jure Travner (to (Slovenia) Mura 05)
6	MF	BUL	Nikolay Dyulgerov (to CSKA Sofia)
9	FW	BUL	Miroslav Antonov (on loan to Montana)
10	FW	BUL	Todor Kolev (to Etar 1924)
13	GK	BUL	Emil Mihaylov (to Lokomotiv Sofia)
17	DF	ARG	Franco Bano (released)
24	MF	BUL	Shener Remzi (released)
30	GK	BUL	Hristo Nikolov (released)
77	DF	SVN	Suvad Grabus (released)

== Minyor Pernik ==
In:

No.	Pos.	Nation	Player
6	DF	BUL	Kamen Hadzhiev (from Pirin Gotse Delchev)
23	DF	BUL	Ventsislav Vasilev (from (Cyprus) Aris Limassol)
39	FW	ALG	Farid Benramdane (free agent)
99	DF	ALG	Sabri Boumelaha (from (Switzerland) Basel)

Out:

No.	Pos.	Nation	Player
2	DF	BUL	Vasil Bozhikov (to Litex Lovech)
27	FW	BUL	Rumen Rangelov (to Botev Vratsa)
28	FW	BUL	Yavor Vandev (to Bdin Vidin)

== Montana ==
In:

No.	Pos.	Nation	Player
4	DF	BUL	Martin Sechkov (from Etar 1924)
5	FW	BUL	Borislav Borisov (on loan from Litex Lovech)
12	GK	COD	N'Sendo Kololo (from (France) Louhans-Cuiseaux)
13	DF	FRA	Boris Deugoué (from (Switzerland) Servette)
18	DF	NGA	Victor Deniran (from Slavia Sofia)
19	FW	BUL	Miroslav Antonov (on loan from Ludogorets Razgrad)
20	MF	BUL	Ivan Valchanov (on loan from Chavdar Etropole)
23	GK	BUL	Ivaylo Yanachkov (from Chavdar Etropole)

Out:

No.	Pos.	Nation	Player
1	GK	BUL	Hristo Ivanov (to Botev Plovdiv)
4	DF	BUL	Radoslav Bachev (to Botev Plovdiv)
5	DF	BUL	Dimitar Koemdzhiev (to Septemvri Simitli)
13	DF	BUL	Georgi Ivanov (to Vidima-Rakovski)
18	MF	BUL	Yanko Sandanski (to Slavia Sofia)
19	FW	BUL	Boris Kondev (to Lokomotiv Sofia)
20	MF	BUL	Nikolay Chipev (to Vidima-Rakovski)

== Slavia Sofia ==
In:

No.	Pos.	Nation	Player
4	MF	MNE	Ramazan Bišević (from (Montenegro) Budućnost Podgorica)
7	MF	BUL	Vladislav Romanov (from Lokomotiv Sofia)
8	FW	BUL	Georgi Hristov (loan return from (Israel) Ashdod)
9	FW	BUL	Vladislav Zlatinov (from Beroe Stara Zagora)
14	MF	BUL	Yanko Sandanski (from Montana)
16	DF	BUL	Georgi Pashov (from Chavdar Etropole)
22	DF	BUL	Ivan Todorov (loan return from Vidima-Rakovski)
23	MF	JPN	Taisuke Akiyoshi (from Singapore Armed Forces)
26	DF	BUL	Mihail Milchev (from Spartak Pleven)
33	MF	BUL	Tsvetomir Todorov (from Bdin Vidin)
35	FW	SRB	Milan Stavrić (from (Serbia) Radnički Niš)
88	MF	BUL	Petar Dimitrov (from Beroe Stara Zagora)
99	FW	BUL	Martin Toshev (from Chernomorets Burgas)

Out:

No.	Pos.	Nation	Player
4	DF	BUL	Atanas Drenovichki (to Vidima-Rakovski)
7	MF	BUL	Iliya Iliev (to Botev Vratsa)
8	MF	BUL	Atanas Bornosuzov (to Lokomotiv Sofia)
14	MF	BUL	Bozhidar Vasev (on loan to Svetkavitsa)
24	MF	BUL	Maksim Stoykov (on loan to Vidima-Rakovski)
26	DF	BUL	Yulian Popev (to Pirin Blagoevgrad)
28	MF	BRA	Eli Marques (to Svetkavitsa)
33	MF	BUL	Galin Ivanov (to Litex Lovech)
35	DF	BUL	Dian Moldovanov (to Neftochimic Burgas)
44	FW	BRA	Jose Junior (on loan to Levski Sofia)
77	MF	BUL	Daniel Peev (to Lokomotiv Sofia)
—	DF	NGA	Victor Deniran (to Montana, previously on loan at Botev Vratsa)

== Svetkavitsa ==
In:

No.	Pos.	Nation	Player
2	DF	BUL	Marian Stanchev (from Bdin Vidin)
5	DF	BUL	Ivan Ivanov (from Bdin Vidin)
12	GK	BUL	Todor Todorov (from Dorostol Silistra)
14	DF	BUL	Petar Trifonov (from Bdin Vidin)
15	MF	BRA	Eli Marques (from Slavia Sofia)
16	DF	BUL	Anton Nedyalkov (from Chavdar Etropole)
20	MF	BUL	Kaloyan Tsvetkov (from Bdin Vidin)
23	DF	BUL	Hristo Stamboliyski (from Chavdar Byala Slatina)

Out:

No.	Pos.	Nation	Player
3	DF	BUL	Georgi Georgiev (to Bdin Vidin)
5	DF	BUL	Ventsislav Marinov (to Spartak Varna)
8	MF	BUL	Martin Hristov (released)
11	MF	BUL	Diyan Dimov (to Etar 1924)
16	MF	EGY	Islam Magdy (released)
17	DF	BUL	Georgi Damyanov (released)
19	FW	EGY	Mohamed Tawakol (released)
20	MF	BUL	Nikolay Petrov (to Etar 1924)
22	DF	EGY	Mahmoud Abdelaati (released)
23	DF	BUL	Ventsislav Yordanov (to Etar 1924)
88	GK	BUL	Aleksandar Dimov (released)

== Vidima-Rakovski ==
In:

No.	Pos.	Nation	Player
4	DF	BUL	Atanas Drenovichki (from Slavia Sofia)
9	MF	BUL	Kristiyan Tafradzhiyski (on loan from Litex Lovech)
11	MF	BUL	Todor Kolev (from Cherno More)
13	DF	BUL	Georgi Ivanov (from Montana)
14	MF	BUL	Maksim Stoykov (on loan from Slavia Sofia)
18	FW	BUL	Milen Tonev (from Chavdar Byala Slatina)
20	MF	BUL	Nikolay Chipev (from Montana)
21	DF	BUL	Dimitar Nakov (from (Cyprus) Atromitos Yeroskipou)
69	GK	BUL	Nikolay Mitev (from Neftochimic Burgas)

Out:

No.	Pos.	Nation	Player
2	DF	BUL	Ivan Todorov (loan return to Slavia Sofia)
6	DF	BUL	Aleksandar Branekov (to Lokomotiv Sofia)
8	MF	BUL	Stanimir Andonov (to Dobrudzha Dobrich)
9	FW	BUL	Veselin Stoykov (to Pirin Blagoevgrad)
10	MF	BUL	Hristo Gospodinov (to Etar 1924)
11	FW	BUL	Georgi Kakalov (to Etar 1924)
20	FW	BUL	Atanas Ivanov (released)
22	GK	BUL	Plamen Kolev (to Cherno More)
24	MF	BUL	Ventsislav Bengyuzov (loan return to Litex Lovech)
