= List of Bulgarian football transfers summer 2010 =

This is a list of Bulgarian football transfers in the 2010 summer transfer window, sorted by club. Only transfers to and from the A PFG are listed.

== Litex ==
In:

No.	Pos.	Nation	Player
4	DF	BIH	Džemal Berberović (from (Turkey) Denizlispor)
11	FW	ROU	Florin Bratu (on loan from (Romania) Dinamo București)
16	MF	BUL	Strahil Popov (loan return from Montana)
31	GK	BRA	Vinícius Barrivieira (on loan from (Brazil) Atlético-PR)

Out:

No.	Pos.	Nation	Player
12	GK	BUL	Todor Todorov (end of contract, free transfer to Loko Plovdiv)
14	DF	BUL	Tsvetomir Panov (on loan at Vidima-Rakovski)
25	DF	BUL	Radostin Kishishev (released, free transfer to (England) Brighton & Hove Albion)
31	GK	BRA	Rodrigo Galatto (loaned to Litex, he was sold from Atletico PR to (Spain) Málaga CF)
71	FW	BUL	Ivelin Popov (to (Turkey) Gaziantepspor)

== CSKA Sofia ==
In:

No.	Pos.	Nation	Player
6	DF	ITA	Giuseppe Aquaro (from (Switzerland) Aarau)
10	MF	ARG	Lucas Trecarichi (from (Spain) Sevilla Atlético )
11	DF	BUL	Ivan Bandalovski (free from Lokomotiv Sofia)
14	FW	BUL	Dimitar Iliev (loan return from Minyor Pernik)
16	FW	ITA	Christian Tiboni (on loan from (Italy) Atalanta)
22	DF	ITA	Marco Esposito (from (Italy) Mantova)
23	MF	GHA	William Tiero (from (Portugal) Académica Coimbra)
26	FW	IRL	Cillian Sheridan (from (Scotland) Celtic)
29	FW	NED	Gregory Nelson (Free agent)
30	DF	ITA	Fabrizio Grillo (from (Italy) Arezzo)
92	GK	ALG	Raïs M'Bolhi (on loan from Slavia Sofia)

Out:

No.	Pos.	Nation	Player
7	FW	BUL	Vladimir Manchev (to Lokomotiv Sofia)
10	FW	POR	Rui Miguel (to (Scotland) Kilmarnock)
11	DF	BUL	Kristiyan Velinov (on loan at Akademik Sofia)
13	DF	BUL	Aleksandar Branekov (to Vidima-Rakovski)
14	MF	BUL	Svetoslav Petrov (to Kaliakra Kavarna)
15	MF	FRA	Elliot Grandin (to (England) Blackpool)
17	MF	ROU	Florentin Petre (released)
20	MF	BUL	Nikolay Manchev (to Botev Plovdiv)
23	FW	ROU	Daniel Pancu (to (Romania) SC Vaslui)
29	DF	MKD	Igor Mitreski (to (Azerbaijan) Neftchi Baku)
32	MF	LVA	Viktors Morozs (to (Cyprus) Atromitos Yeroskipou)
—	MF	BUL	Atanas Zehirov (Terminated contract)

== Levski Sofia ==
In:

No.	Pos.	Nation	Player
2	DF	NED	Dustley Mulder (free agent, previous at (Netherlands) RKC Waalwijk)
3	MF	NED	Serginho Greene (free agent, previously at (Netherlands) Vitesse Arnhem)
5	DF	BUL	Ivo Ivanov (from Beroe Stara Zagora)
17	FW	BUL	Daniel Mladenov (from Pirin Blagoevgrad)
23	MF	NED	Andwélé Slory (free agent, previously at (England) W.B.A.)
26	DF	BUL	Kalin Shtarkov (from Chavdar Etropole)
28	FW	BUL	Aleksandar Kirov (loan return from Lokomotiv Mezdra)
29	FW	BUL	Ismail Isa (loan return from Lokomotiv Mezdra)
39	FW	FRA	Garra Dembélé (from Lokomotiv Plovdiv)
85	GK	BUL	Kiril Akalski (from Lokomotiv Plovdiv)

Out:

No.	Pos.	Nation	Player
2	DF	BUL	Victor Genev (to Slavia Sofia)
8	MF	BUL	Georgi Sarmov (to (Turkey) Kasımpaşa)
11	DF	BUL	Elin Topuzakov (to (Israel) Hapoel Ramat Gan)
18	FW	BUL	Georgi Hristov (to Slavia Sofia)
19	FW	BUL	Miroslav Antonov (on loan at Montana)
19	FW	BUL	Ivan Tsachev (to Slavia Sofia)
21	DF	SVK	Peter Petráš (end of contract, free transfer to (Slovakia) Tatran Prešov)
23	DF	CZE	David Bystroň (to (Czech Republic) Viktoria Plzeň)
24	FW	BUL	Nikolay Dimitrov (to (Turkey) Kasımpaşa)
27	FW	FRA	Cedric Bardon (released, free transfer to (France) ES Fréjus)
32	MF	BUL	Dimitar Telkiyski (to (Israel) Hapoel Ramat Gan)
70	MF	SRB	Saša Simonović (end of contract)
77	FW	BUL	Enyo Krastovchev (to (Greece) Ethnikos Piraeus F.C.)

== Lokomotiv Sofia ==
In:

No.	Pos.	Nation	Player
14	DF	BUL	Milen Lahchev (from Vidima-Rakovski)
21	FW	BUL	Iskren Pisarov (from Loko Plovdiv, previously on loan at Beroe)
22	GK	BUL	Boyan Peykov (from Beroe)
28	DF	BUL	Atanas Atanasov (from Beroe)
77	FW	BUL	Vladimir Manchev (from CSKA Sofia)
88	MF	BUL	Vladislav Romanov (from Botev Vratsa)

Out:

No.	Pos.	Nation	Player
8	MF	CRO	Viktor Špišić (to (Croatia) NK Karlovac)
13	DF	CRO	Vanja Džaferović (to (Cyprus) Ethnikos Achna)
15	FW	BUL	Danail Mitev (to Beroe)
16	MF	BUL	Hristo Zlatinski (to Loko Plovdiv)
19	FW	BUL	Martin Kamburov (to (China) Dalian Shide)
21	GK	BUL	Yulian Levashki (to Montana)
22	DF	BUL	Ivan Bandalovski (to CSKA Sofia)
24	DF	BUL	Ivan Paskov (retired)
31	DF	SRB	Zvonimir Stanković (released)

== Chernomorets ==
In:

No.	Pos.	Nation	Player
11	MF	BUL	Plamen Asenov Krumov (from Minyor Pernik)
16	MF	BUL	Todor Palankov (from Pirin Blagoevgrad)
21	FW	CGO	Lys Mouithys (from (Morocco) Wydad Casablanca)
29	GK	SRB	Lazar Jovisić (from (Portugal) Nacional)
30	MF	BRA	António dos Santos (from (Switzerland) Grasshopper)
39	FW	FRA	Moussa Koita (from (Belgium) Genk)
77	FW	BUL	Georgi Andonov (from Beroe)

Out:

No.	Pos.	Nation	Player
17	MF	ROU	Cristian Muscalu (loan return to (Azerbaijan) FK Baku)
19	MF	ARG	Roberto Carboni (released)
20	MF	VEN	Héctor González (to (Cyprus) Alki Larnaca)
25	FW	BUL	Plamen Stoyanov Krumov (retired)
32	FW	BRA	Dalmo (loan return to (Czech Republic) 1. FC Brno)

== Slavia ==
In:

No.	Pos.	Nation	Player
8	FW	BUL	Antonio Pavlov (from Vidima-Rakovski)
9	FW	BUL	Georgi Hristov (from Levski Sofia)
11	FW	BUL	Radoslav Vasilev (from (England) Reading)
13	MF	BUL	Stefan Kikov (from Sliven 2000)
17	FW	BUL	Nikolay Bozhov (from Akademik Sofia)
19	DF	BRA	Rafael Barbosa (from (Azerbaijan) FK Baku)
20	DF	BUL	Radoslav Dimitrov (loan return from Montana)
22	DF	BUL	Victor Genev (from Levski Sofia)
24	FW	BUL	Ivan Tsachev (from Levski Sofia)
25	DF	NGA	Victor Deniran (loan return from Sportist Svoge)
27	MF	ISR	Tom Mansharov (from (Israel) Maccabi Tel Aviv)
44	DF	BUL	Simeon Mechev (loan return from Montana)

Out:

No.	Pos.	Nation	Player
3	MF	BUL	Borislav Georgiev (released)
4	MF	BUL	Nikolay Petrov (to Kaliakra Kavarna)
5	MF	SRB	Pavle Popara (on loan at (Romania) Astra Ploeşti)
8	FW	BUL	Petar Dimitrov (to Beroe)
14	MF	BUL	Ivan Zdravkov (on loan at Kaliakra Kavarna)
19	FW	BRA	Jose Junior (on loan at (Armenia) Banants)
20	MF	BUL	Dzuneit Yashar (to Nesebar)
22	DF	MKD	Robert Petrov (to (Azerbaijan) AZAL Baku)
26	GK	ALG	Raïs M'Bolhi (on loan at CSKA Sofia)
27	DF	FRA	Steeve Joseph-Reinette (on loan at (Russia) Sibir)
28	DF	BUL	Aleksandar Tomash (to Beroe)

== Cherno More ==
In:

No.	Pos.	Nation	Player
1	GK	BUL	Petar Denchev (from Sliven 2000)
8	FW	BUL	Doncho Atanasov (from Beroe)
9	FW	BUL	Miroslav Budinov (from Akademik Sofia)
12	DF	BRA	Marco Tiago (from (Portugal) Freamunde)
16	FW	BRA	Mário Jardel (from (Brazil) Flamengo Pl)
17	MF	BUL	Yancho Andreev (loan return from Chernomorets Balchik)
19	MF	BUL	Vladko Kostadinov (loan return from Chernomorets Balchik)
24	MF	BUL	Dimitar Petkov (from CSKA Sofia)

Out:

No.	Pos.	Nation	Player
1	GK	BUL	Karamfil Ilchev (to Beroe)
8	MF	BUL	Atanas Bornosuzov (to (Romania) Astra Ploeşti)
9	FW	BUL	Gerasim Zakov (to Vidima-Rakovski)
18	MF	BUL	Georgi Avramov (to Montana)
84	DF	MLI	Mamoutou Coulibaly (released)

== Minyor ==
In:

No.	Pos.	Nation	Player
1	GK	BUL	Nikolay Bankov (from Spartak Varna)
8	MF	BUL	Yordan Todorov (from (Romania) Steaua București)
17	MF	MKD	Vančo Trajanov (from (Israel) Maccabi PT)
26	MF	BUL	Tsvetomir Todorov (from Bdin)
27	FW	BUL	Rumen Rangelov (from Botev Vratsa)

Out:

No.	Pos.	Nation	Player
9	FW	BUL	Stanislav Rumenov (retired)
15	DF	BUL	Dimitar Mutafov (to Sportist Svoge)
17	FW	BUL	Atanas Nikolov (to Pirin Blagoevgrad)
31	FW	SRB	Pavle Delibašić (released)
41	FW	BUL	Dimitar Iliev (loan return to CSKA Sofia)
77	MF	BUL	Plamen Asenov Krumov (to Chernomorets Burgas)

== Pirin ==
In:

No.	Pos.	Nation	Player
4	DF	BUL	Kiril Chobanov (from Chavdar Etropole)
5	MF	BUL	Aleksandar Bashliev (loan return from Septemvri Simitli)
8	MF	BUL	Anton Kostadinov (from Vihren Sandanski)
10	MF	BUL	Ruslan Ivanov (from Vihren Sandanski)
15	FW	BUL	Blagoy Paskov (from CSKA Sofia, previously on loan at Bdin)
20	MF	BUL	Viktor Petakov (from Sliven 2000)
28	FW	BUL	Veselin Stoykov (loan return from Bansko)
33	FW	BUL	Atanas Nikolov (from Minyor Pernik)

Out:

No.	Pos.	Nation	Player
8	MF	BUL	Blagoy Nakov (to Vihren Sandanski)
10	MF	BUL	Todor Palankov (to Chernomorets Burgas)
17	FW	BUL	Daniel Mladenov (to Levski Sofia)
20	MF	MKD	Dragi Kotsev (to Lokomotiv Plovdiv)
25	DF	BUL	Miroslav Rizov (released)

== Beroe ==
In:

No.	Pos.	Nation	Player
4	DF	BUL	Todor Dinchev (from Minyor Radnevo)
5	DF	BUL	Georgi Hashev (loan return from Minyor Radnevo)
11	MF	BUL	Stoycho Mladenov (from Sportist Svoge)
14	FW	BUL	Evgeni Yordanov (from Vihren Sandanski)
15	FW	BUL	Ivan Yanchev (from Svilengrad)
16	MF	BUL	Stefan Velev (from Lyubimetz 2007)
19	FW	BUL	Vladislav Zlatinov (from Bansko)
21	MF	BUL	Todor Hristov (from Nesebar)
22	GK	BUL	Karamfil Ilchev (from Cherno More)
23	DF	BUL	Aleksandar Tomash (from Slavia Sofia)
28	DF	BUL	Veselin Penev (from Nesebar)
88	FW	BUL	Petar Dimitrov (from Slavia Sofia)

Out:

No.	Pos.	Nation	Player
4	DF	BUL	Dimitar Vakavliev (to Lyubimetz 2007)
5	DF	BUL	Ivo Ivanov (to Levski Sofia)
11	FW	BUL	Doncho Atanasov (to Cherno More)
21	MF	BUL	Milen Tanev (to Chernomorets Balchik)
22	GK	BUL	Boyan Peykov (to Lokomotiv Sofia)
28	DF	BUL	Atanas Atanasov (to Lokomotiv Sofia)
77	FW	BUL	Georgi Andonov (to Chernomorets Burgas)

== Montana ==
In:

No.	Pos.	Nation	Player
2	DF	BUL	Georgi Mechedzhiev (from Loko Plovdiv)
5	FW	BUL	Ventsislav Hristov (from Nesebar)
10	FW	BUL	Miroslav Antonov (on loan from Levski Sofia)
13	DF	BUL	Dimitar Nakov (from Sportist Svoge)
15	MF	BUL	Georgi Avramov (from Cherno More)
17	DF	BUL	Murad Ibrahim (from Spartak Plovdiv)
23	GK	BUL	Yulian Levashki (from Loko Sofia)

Out:

No.	Pos.	Nation	Player
5	DF	BUL	Simeon Mechev (loan return to Slavia Sofia)
10	FW	BUL	Ventsislav Ivanov (to (Cyprus) AEP Paphos)
13	MF	BUL	Stefan Harlov (to Etar)
17	MF	BUL	Slavcho Boychev (to Vihren Sandanski)
18	FW	BUL	Miroslav Petrov (to Vihren Sandanski)
19	MF	BUL	Strahil Popov (loan return to Litex Lovech)
20	DF	BUL	Radoslav Dimitrov (loan return to Slavia Sofia)
26	GK	BUL	Hristo Bahtarliev (to Vihren Sandanski)

== Lokomotiv Plovdiv ==
In:

No.	Pos.	Nation	Player
2	DF	FRA	Jérémie Rodrigues (from (Cyprus) Nea Salamina)
6	DF	BUL	Plamen Krachunov (from Maritsa Plovdiv)
7	DF	BUL	Tsvetan Yotov (from Maritsa Plovdiv)
16	MF	BUL	Hristo Zlatinski (from Loko Sofia)
17	MF	BUL	Martin Kerchev (from Loko Mezdra)
18	FW	CIV	Bassilia Sakanoko (from (Belgium) OH Leuven)
19	FW	SEN	Basile de Carvalho (from (France) RC Strasbourg)
24	DF	FRA	Samir Bengelloun (from (Cyprus) APOP)
25	DF	BUL	Emil Argirov (from Spartak Plovdiv)
28	GK	BUL	Todor Todorov (from Litex Lovech)
29	MF	MKD	Dragi Kotsev (from Pirin Blagoevgrad)
33	GK	FRA	Florian Lucchini (from (Cyprus) AEP Paphos)
55	DF	BUL	Martin Kavdanski (from Slavia Sofia)
99	FW	URU	Nicolás Raimondi (from (Bolivia) Jorge Wilstermann)

Out:

No.	Pos.	Nation	Player
4	DF	BUL	Petar Kyumurdzhiev (to Akademik Sofia)
7	MF	BUL	Yordan Todorov (to (Romania) Steaua București)
11	MF	BRA	Dakson (to (Brazil) Campo Grande)
12	GK	BUL	Kiril Akalski (to Levski Sofia)
18	MF	BUL	Nikolay Chipev (released)
23	DF	BUL	Georgi Mechedzhiev (to Montana)
24	DF	BUL	Martin Sechkov (to Akademik Sofia)
32	GK	BUL	Ivan Tsarvarishki (to Septemvri Simitli)
39	FW	FRA	Garra Dembélé (to Levski Sofia)
88	MF	SRB	Milan Milutinović (released)

== Sliven ==
In:

No.	Pos.	Nation	Player
1	GK	BUL	Georgi Georgiev (from Minyor Radnevo)
4	MF	BUL	Milen Vasilev (from Botev Kozloduy)
9	FW	BUL	Antonio Mihaylov (from (Italy) AC Milan)
11	MF	BRA	David Lazari (from (Brazil) Santa Cruz)
19	FW	BUL	Evgeni Ignatov (loan return from Sportist Svoge)

Out:

No.	Pos.	Nation	Player
1	GK	BUL	Todor Todorov (loan return to Litex Lovech)
3	MF	BUL	Stefan Kikov (to Slavia Sofia)
13	MF	BUL	Vasil Velev (to Vidima-Rakovski)
17	MF	BUL	Viktor Petakov (to Pirin Blagoevgrad)
20	MF	BUL	Vladislav Uzunov (to Brestnik 1948)
21	MF	BUL	Ivaylo Petrov (to Svetkavitsa)
22	GK	BUL	Petar Denchev (to Cherno More)
23	MF	BUL	Ivelin Yanev (to Chernomorets Balchik)
30	MF	BUL	Marko Markov (to Kaliakra Kavarna)

== Vidima-Rakovski ==
In:

No.	Pos.	Nation	Player
3	DF	BUL	Samet Ashimov (from Minyor Pernik)
6	DF	BUL	Aleksandar Branekov (from CSKA Sofia)
7	MF	BUL	Vasil Velev (from Sliven 2000)
9	MF	BUL	Nikolay Vladinov (from Botev Krivodol)
10	FW	BUL	Gerasim Zakov (from Cherno More)
13	MF	BUL	Dobri Dobrev (from Minyor Radnevo)
14	DF	BUL	Zdravko Stankov (from Loko Mezdra)
17	FW	BUL	Anatoli Todorov (from Loko Mezdra)
18	MF	BUL	Atanas Vargov (from Dunav Rousse)
19	FW	BUL	Emil Stoev (from Minyor Radnevo)
21	MF	BUL	Nikolay Tsvetkov (from Sportist Svoge)
23	MF	BUL	Stanislav Ivanov (from Balkan Botevgrad)
25	DF	BUL	Tsvetomir Panov (on loan from Litex Lovech)

Out:

No.	Pos.	Nation	Player
3	DF	BUL	Ivan Todorov (to Chernomorets Pomorie)
7	MF	BUL	Ivaylo Radentsov (to Kaliakra Kavarna)
8	MF	BUL	Iliyan Trifonov (to Etar)
9	FW	BUL	Antonio Pavlov (to Slavia Sofia)
14	DF	BUL	Milen Lahchev (to Lokomotiv Sofia)
21	MF	BUL	Milen Vankov (on loan to Yantra Gabrovo)

== Kaliakra ==
In:

No.	Pos.	Nation	Player
3	DF	BUL	Martin Dimov (from Sportist Svoge)
7	MF	BUL	Ivan Zdravkov (on loan from Slavia Sofia)
8	MF	BUL	Ivaylo Radentsov (from Vidima-Rakovski)
10	MF	BUL	Nikolay Petrov (from Slavia Sofia)
15	DF	BUL	Anton Petrov (from Chavdar Etropole)
20	MF	BUL	Marko Markov (from Sliven 2000)
27	MF	BUL	Alexandar Mladenov (from (Russia) Krasnodar)
29	GK	BUL	Yordan Gospodinov (from Slavia Sofia)
31	FW	BUL	Georgi Filipov (from Chernomorets Balchik)
33	GK	BUL	Miroslav Radev (from Minyor Radnevo)
77	MF	BUL	Svetoslav Petrov (from CSKA Sofia)

Out:

No.	Pos.	Nation	Player
3	FW	BUL	Grisha Ivanov (to Brestnik 1948)
6	DF	BUL	Filip Florov (to Dobrudzha Dobrich)
7	MF	BUL	Stoyan Abrashev (to Sportist Svoge)
10	FW	BUL	Ivan Karadzhov (to Spartak 1918)
19	DF	BUL	Darin Andonov (on loan to Spartak Varna)
20	MF	BUL	Valeri Mihaylov (to Dobrudzha Dobrich)
33	GK	BUL	Nikolay Radomirov (to Chernomorets Balchik)

== Akademik ==
In:

No.	Pos.	Nation	Player
4	FW	BUL	Ivan Redovski (from Balkan Botevgrad)
5	DF	BUL	Martin Sechkov (from Lokomotiv Plovdiv)
6	DF	BUL	Petar Kyumurdzhiev (from Lokomotiv Plovdiv)
7	MF	BUL	Mihail Aleksandrov (from (Germany) Borussia Dortmund)
9	FW	BUL	Ivaylo Dimitrov (from Sportist Svoge)
14	DF	BUL	Lyuben Nikolov (from Nesebar)
17	DF	BUL	Kristiyan Velinov (on loan from CSKA Sofia)
19	FW	BUL	Stoyko Sakaliev (from (Poland) Arka Gdynia)
20	MF	BRA	Marcos Bonfim (from (Brazil) Juventus Jaraguá)
21	DF	COD	Pieter Mbemba (from (Turkey) Sivasspor)
24	MF	TUR	Güven Güneri (from (Turkey) Fenerbahçe, previously on loan at Şanlıurfa)
33	GK	BUL	Emil Mihaylov (from Rilski Sportist)
85	GK	BUL	Borislav Stoyanov (from Malesh Mikrevo)

Out:

No.	Pos.	Nation	Player
1	GK	BUL	Vasil Vasilev (to Malesh Mikrevo)
4	DF	BUL	Goran Churkin (to Vihren Sandanski)
6	DF	BUL	Tsvetan Antov (to Botev Vratsa)
9	FW	BUL	Miroslav Budinov (to Cherno More)
11	MF	BUL	Veselin Veselinov (released)
14	DF	BUL	Ilian Genadiev (to Septemvri Simitli)
17	FW	BUL	Nikolay Bozhov (to Slavia Sofia)
20	MF	BUL	Georgi Kovachev (to Chavdar Byala Slatina)
25	FW	BUL	Ivan Zaykov (to Levski Elin Pelin)
