= Romario (disambiguation) =

Romário (born 1966) is a Brazilian politician and retired footballer.

Romario may also refer to:

== Footballers ==
- Romário (footballer, born 1985), full name Romário Pereira Sipião, Brazilian footballer
- Romário (footballer, born 1990), full name Romário Vieira Da Silva, Brazilian football midfielder
- Romarinho (footballer, born 1990), full name Romário Ricardo Silva, Brazilian footballer
- Romário (footballer, born March 1992), full name Romário Guilherme dos Santos, Brazilian footballer
- Romário (footballer, born June 1992), full name Romário Leiria de Moura, Brazilian footballer
- Romarinho (footballer, born 1993), full name Romário de Souza Faria Filho, Brazilian footballer, son of the politician and former footballer
- Romarinho (footballer, born 1994), full name José Romário Silva de Souza, Brazilian footballer
- Romário (footballer, born 2002), full name Marcos Vinicius Alves Barreira, Brazilian footballer banned for a match-fixing scandal
- Romário Baldé (born 1996), Bissau-Guinean footballer
- Moses Naserat Romario Banggo (born 1990), Indonesian footballer
- Romário Baró (born 2000), Bissau-Guinean-born Portuguese footballer
- Romario Barthéléry (born 1994), Martiniquais footballer
- Romario Benzar (born 1992), Romanian footballer
- Romario Campbell (born 1989), Jamaican footballer
- Romario Harewood (born 1994), Barbadian footballer
- José Romario Hernández (born 1994), Mexican footballer
- Romario Ibarra (born 1994), Ecuadorian footballer
- Romario Kortzorg (born 1989), Dutch footballer
- Romário Leiria (born 1992), Brazilian footballer
- Romário Pires (born 1989), Brazilian footballer
- Romario Martin (born 1999), Saint Kitts and Nevis footballer
- Romario Moise (born 1995), Romanian footballer
- Romario Piggott (born 1995), Panamanian footballer
- Romario Baggio Rakotoarisoa (born 1996), Malagasy footballer
- Romario da Silva Resende (born 1990), Brazilian footballer
- Romário Ribeiro (born 1989), Brazilian footballer
- Romario Sabajo (born 1989), Dutch footballer
- Romário da Silva Santos (born 1993), Brazilian footballer
- Romario Vieira (born 1998), Bissau-Guinean footballer
- Romário Vieira Da Silva (born 1990), Brazilian footballer playing in Mexico
- Romario Williams (born 1994), Jamaican footballer

== Other people ==
- Romário Leitão (born 1997), São Toméan long distance runner
- Romário Roque (born 1998), Colombian basketballer
- Romario Sharma (born 1994), Indian cricketer
- Romario Shepherd (born 1994), Guyanese cricketer
- Romário Xolo Maridueña (born 2001), American actor

== See also ==
- Estádio Romário de Souza Faria, Brazilian football stadium, and home of Duque de Caxias FC
