= Minkow (surname) =

Minkow is a surname. Notable people with this surname include:

- Aleksandr Vitalyevich Minkov (born 1957), Russian singer, songwriter, and musician
- Marin Minkov, also known as Maxim of Bulgaria (1914-2012), Bulgarian patriarch of the Bulgarian Orthodox Church from 1971 to 2012
- Mark Anatolievich Minkov (1944–2012), Soviet/Russian music composer
- Mihail Minkov (born 1993), Bulgarian professional footballer
- Nikola Minkov (born 1987), Bulgarian footballer
- Nikolay Minkov (born 1997), Bulgarian footballer
- Svetoslav Konstantinov Minkov (1902–1966), Bulgarian absurdist fiction writer
