= Wellington Camargo =

Brazilian footballer (born 1990)

Personal information
- Full name: Wellington Camargo do Nascimento
- Date of birth: April 7, 1990 (age 36)
- Place of birth: Carlópolis, Brazil
- Height: 1.80 m (5 ft 11 in)
- Position: Midfielder

Senior career*
Years	Team	Apps	(Gls)
2008–2010	Campo Mourão		
2010	Grêmio Maringá		
2011–2012	Slavia Sofia	1	(0)
2013	Rad Beograd	0	(0)
- * Club domestic league appearances and goals as of 2 September 2013

Wellington Camargo do Nascimento, also known as Tom (born 7 April 1990) is a Brazilian footballer who plays as a midfielder. He played for FK Rad in the 2012–13 Serbian SuperLiga.

== Career ==
Born in Carlópolis, he started playing as senior with Campo Mourão. During the first half of 2010 he played with Campo Mourão U-20 team, having scored 10 goals in the Campeonato Paranaense U-20, and also for the senior team, having scored 5 goals. On September 20, 2010 he signed with Grêmio Maringá.

In the season 2011–12 he played with Slavia Sofia in the Bulgarian A PFG.

In August 2013, Wellington Camargo signed with Serbian top-flight side FK Rad.
