= Lazar Jovišić =

Serbian footballer

Personal information
- Date of birth: 18 January 1989 (age 37)
- Place of birth: Inđija, SFR Yugoslavia
- Height: 2.02 m (6 ft 8 in)
- Position: Goalkeeper

Team information
- Current team: Jadran Golubinci

Senior career*
Years	Team	Apps	(Gls)
2006–2007	Jedinstvo Stara Pazova	33	(0)
2007	Borac Čačak	0	(0)
2008–2010	Nacional	0	(0)
2010–2011	Chernomorets Burgas	0	(0)
2011	→ Chernomorets Pomorie (loan)	11	(0)
2011	Jedinstvo Stara Pazova	15	(0)
2012–2014	Dunav Stari Banovci	43	(0)
2014–2015	Inđija	13	(0)
2015–2016	Dunav Stari Banovci		
2016–2021	Jedinstvo Stara Pazova		
2021–2023	Radnički Nova Pazova		
2023–	Jadran Golubinci		
- * Club domestic league appearances and goals as of 23 November 2014

Lazar Jovisić (Serbian Cyrillic: Лазар Јовишић, born 18 January 1989) is a Serbian football goalkeeper who plays with Jadran Golubinci.

== Career ==
Born in Inđija, SR Serbia, he begin his career in 2006 when he became a senior at FK Jedinstvo Stara Pazova. He made 33 appearances for Jedinstvo in the 2006–07 season in the Serbian League Vojvodina and that called the attention of Serbian SuperLiga side FK Borac Čačak which brought him into their main team in summer 2007. However, he did not get any chances to play so by the winter break of the 2007–08 season he decided to move abroad and joined Portuguese Primeira Liga side C.D. Nacional. He stayed in Madeira until 2010, however he failed to make a debut in the league. In summer 2010 he moved to Bulgaria and signed with A PFG side PSFC Chernomorets Burgas however he was loaned to second level PFC Chernomorets Pomorie during the 2010–11 season. During the winter break of the 2011–12 season, after 4 years abroad, he returned to Serbia and joined the team where he had made his senior debut, FK Jedinstvo Stara Pazova.
