= Carlópolis =

Coordinates: 23°25′S 49°41′W

- Municipality
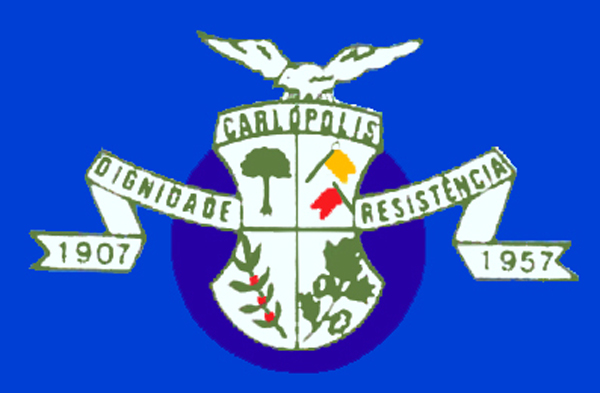
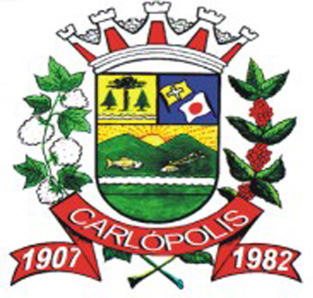
- Flag Coat of arms
- Interactive map of Carlópolis
- Country: Brazil
- Region: Southern
- State: Paraná
- Mesoregion: Norte Pioneiro Paranaense

Population (2020)
  - Total: 14,356
- Time zone: UTC−3 (BRT)

Carlópolis is a municipality in the state of Paraná in the Southern Region of Brazil.

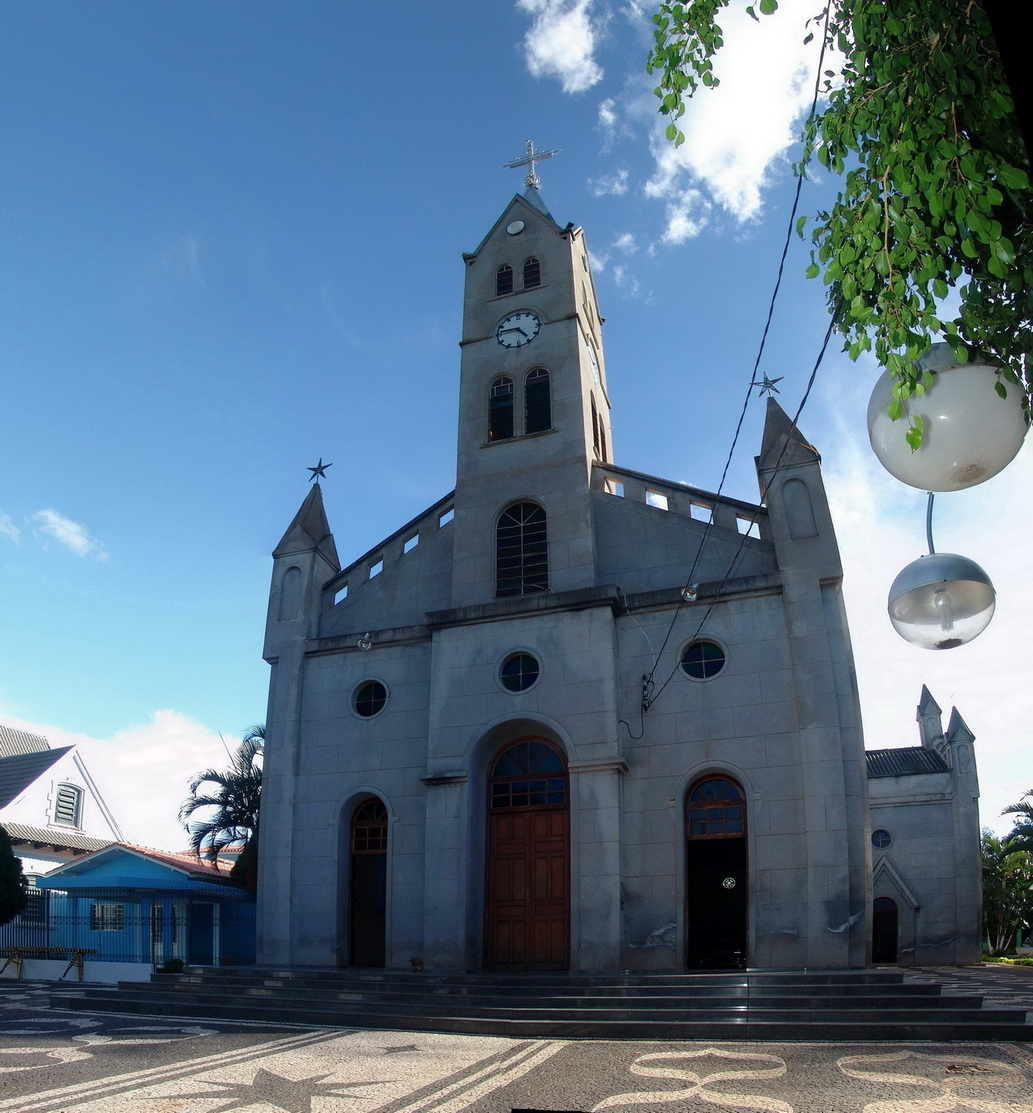

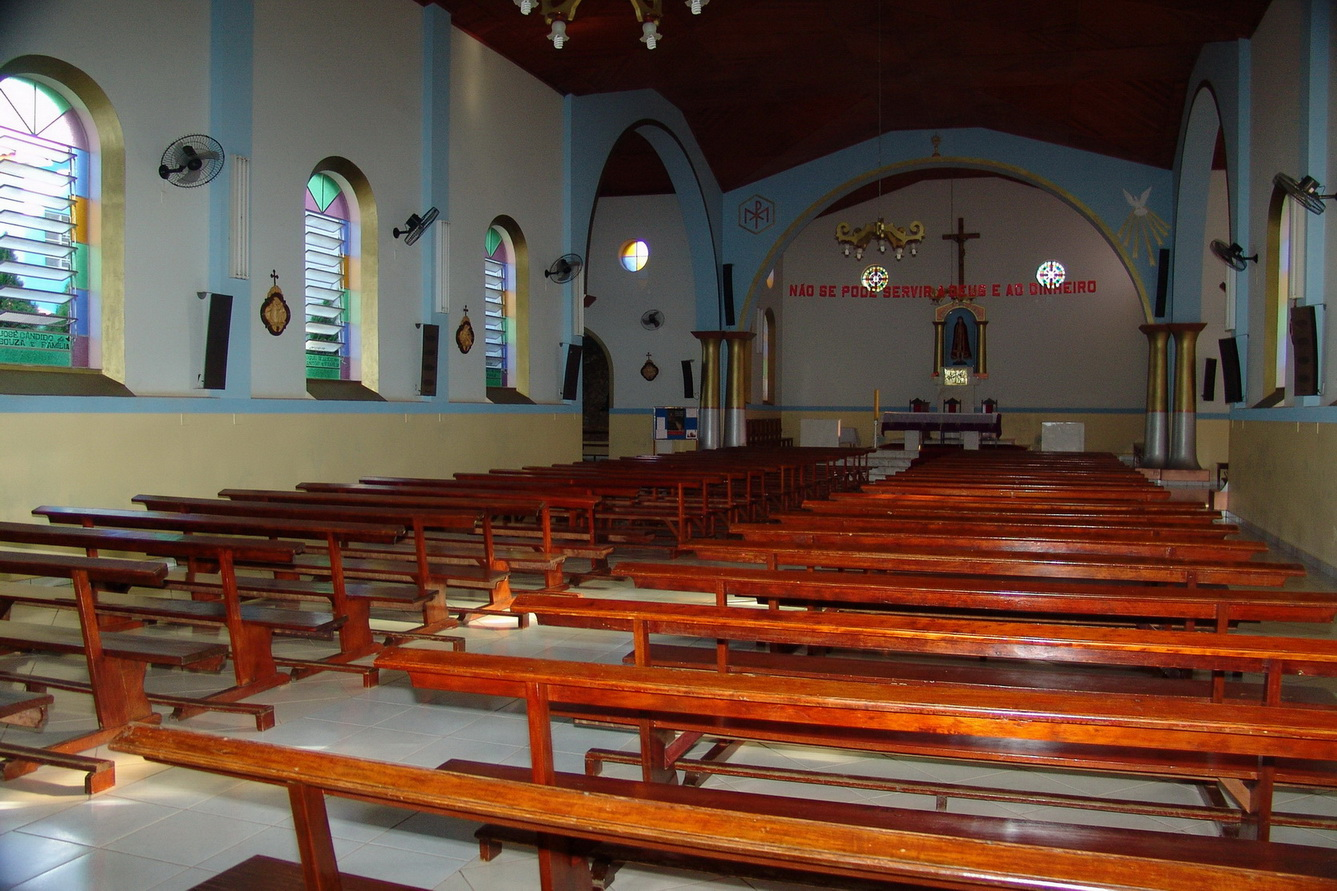

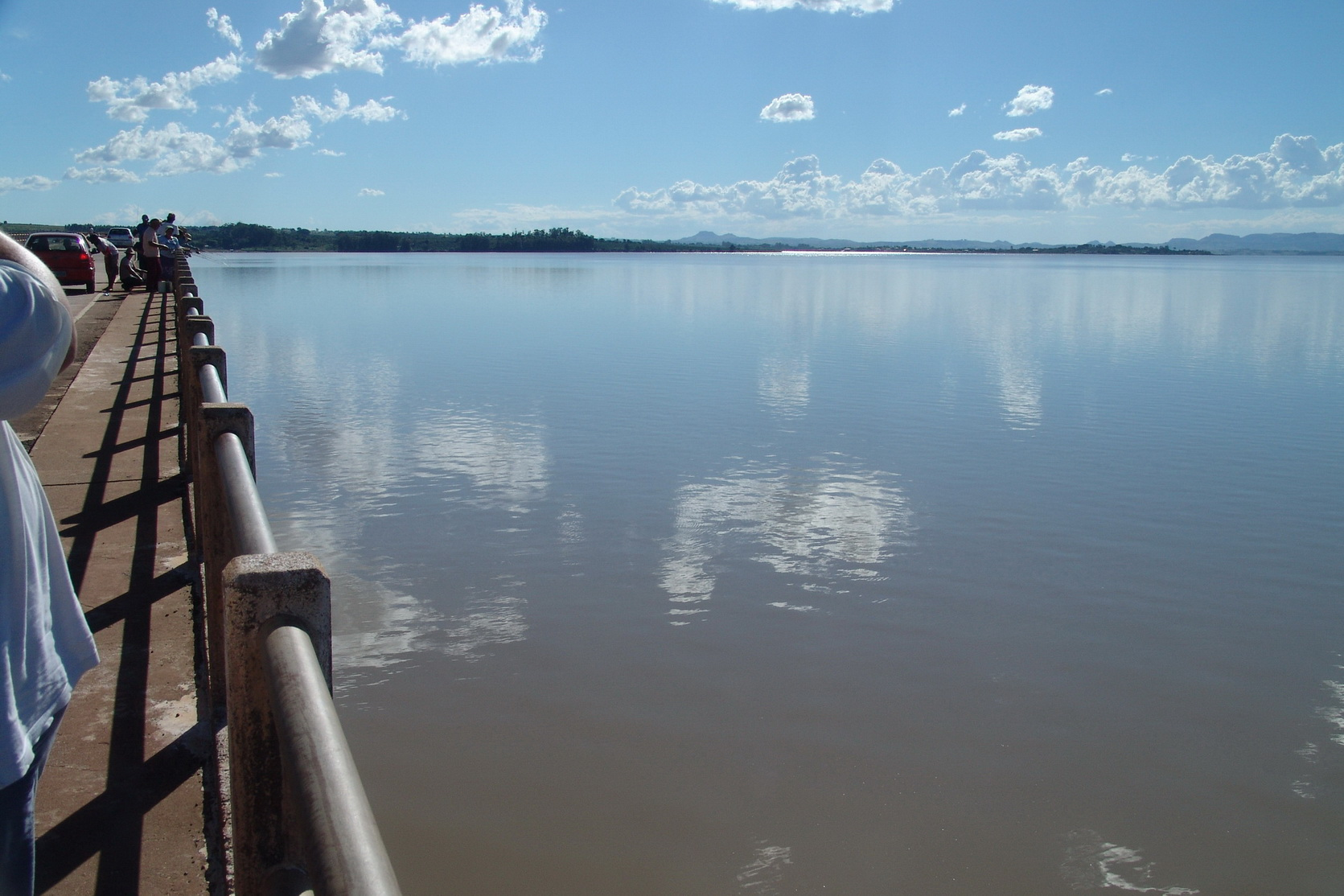

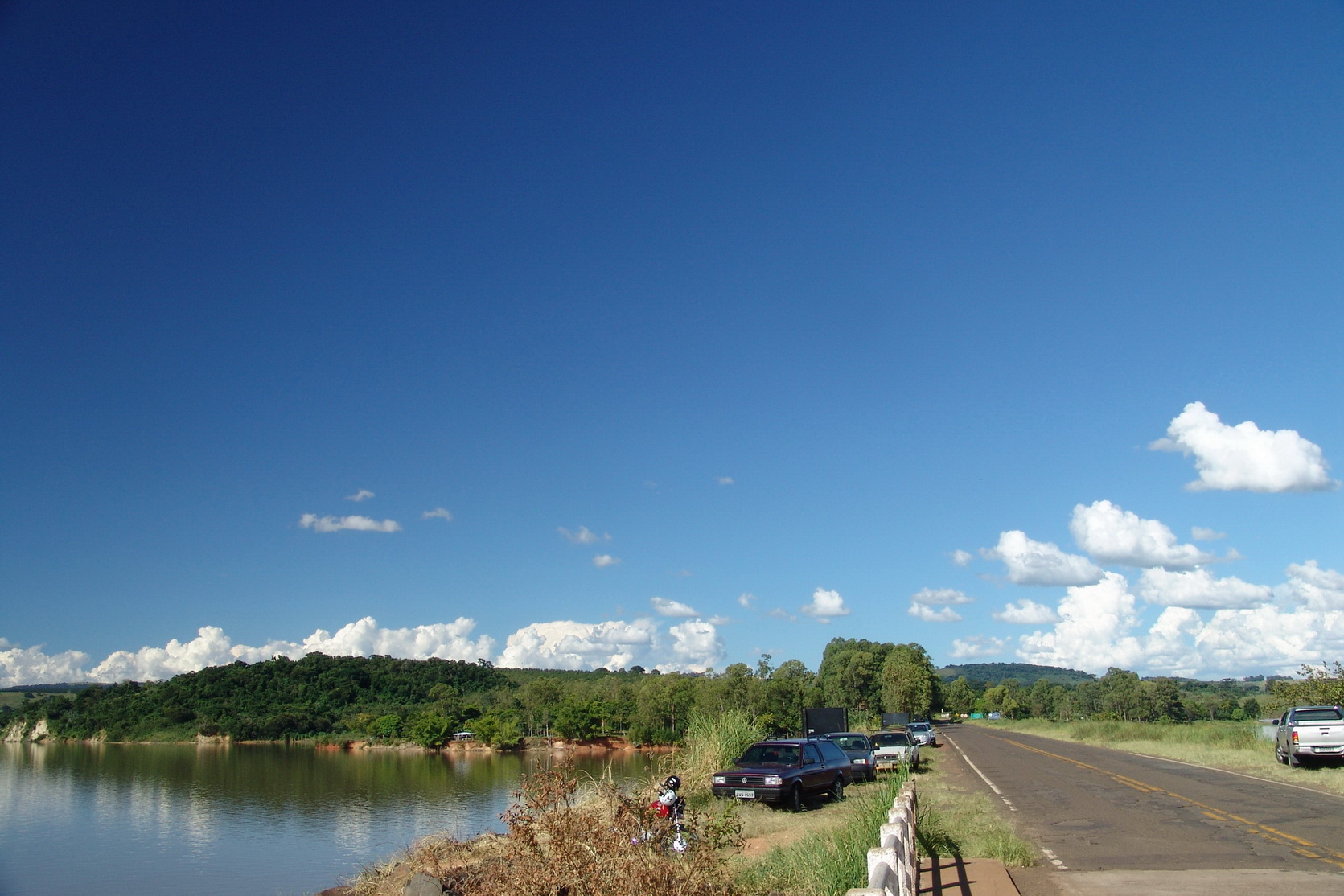

== See also ==
- List of municipalities in Paraná
