= Viktor Petakov =

Bulgarian footballer

Personal information
- Full name: Viktor Yavorov Petakov
- Date of birth: 27 January 1989 (age 37)
- Place of birth: Gotse Delchev, Bulgaria
- Height: 1.74 m (5 ft 9 in)
- Position: Midfielder

Team information
- Current team: Union Ried im Traunkreis

Youth career
- 2002–2003: Pirin Gotse Delchev

Senior career*
Years	Team	Apps	(Gls)
2003–2007	Pirin 2001		
2008–2009	Lokomotiv Mezdra	13	(0)
2009–2010	Sliven 2000	21	(0)
2010	Pirin Blagoevgrad	1	(0)
2011	Chernomorets Pomorie	0	(0)
2011–2012	NSA College team	?	(?)
2012	Vitosha Bistritsa	?	(?)
2013	Vitosha Dolna Dikanya	?	(?)
2013–2014	Union Ried im Traunkreis	23	(25)
2014–2015	Union Ried im Traunkreis	17	(12)
2015–2016	Union Ried im Traunkreis	6	(4)
2016	Spitz Attnang	22	(15)
2017	Union Steinhaus	14	(6)
2017–2018	ATSV Bamminger (Sattledt)	1	(1)

International career
	Bulgaria U17	14	(4)
2008–2009	Bulgaria U21	10	(0)
- * Club domestic league appearances and goals as of 15 September 2013

Viktor Petakov (Bulgarian: Виктор Петаков) (born 27 January 1989) is a Bulgarian footballer, who plays for Austrian club ATSV Bamminger (Sattledt) in Landesliga West. He primarily plays as left/right winger, but he can play as striker too.
