= Hristo Stamboliyski =

Bulgarian footballer

Personal information
- Date of birth: 2 March 1992 (age 34)
- Place of birth: Bulgaria
- Position: Defender

Team information
- Current team: Sliven
- Number: 23

Youth career
- Levski Sofia

Senior career*
| Years | Team | Apps | (Gls) |
| 2010–2011 | Levski Sofia | 1 | (0) |
| 2011 | → Chavdar BS (loan) | 1 | (0) |
| 2012–2013 | Svetkavitsa | 3 | (0) |
| 2013–2014 | Sliven | 1 | (0) |
- * Club domestic league appearances and goals as of 8 April 2012

Hristo Stamboliyski (Bulgarian: Христо Стамболийски; born 2 March 1992) is a Bulgarian footballer, who currently plays as a defender for Svetkavitsa.
