= Romário Ribeiro =

Brazilian footballer

Personal information
- Full name: Romário de Paula Ribeiro
- Date of birth: 6 September 1989 (age 37)
- Place of birth: Pará de Minas, Brazil
- Height: 1.80 m (5 ft 11 in)
- Position: Forward

Team information
- Current team: Casa Pia

Youth career
- 2007–2008: Belenenses

Senior career*
Years	Team	Apps	(Gls)
2008–2010	Belenenses	2	(1)
2008–2009	→ Chaves (loan)		
2011	Cartagena B		
2011–2012	Operário		
2012	Coimbra		
2013	Democrata		
2013	Rio Branco		
2014–2015	Fátima	26	(12)
2015–2016	Sintrense	16	(1)
2016–	Casa Pia	1	(0)
- * Club domestic league appearances and goals as of 28 August 2016

Romário de Paula Ribeiro (born 6 September 1989) is a Brazilian football player who plays for Casa Pia.

== Club career ==
He made his professional debut in the Primeira Liga for Belenenses on 3 April 2010 as a late substitute in a 0–0 draw against Paços de Ferreira. In his second, and, to date, last Primeira Liga game on 8 May 2010, he scored a goal in a 2–1 victory over Vitória de Setúbal.
