= Vladimir Vladimirov (footballer) =

Bulgarian footballer

Personal information
- Full name: Vladimir Nikolaev Vladimirov
- Date of birth: 21 September 1986 (age 40)
- Place of birth: Sofia, Bulgaria
- Height: 1.73 m (5 ft 8 in)
- Position: Winger

Team information
- Current team: Sportist Svoge
- Number: 11

Youth career
- 1996–2005: Levski Sofia

Senior career*
Years	Team	Apps	(Gls)
2006–2008	Chavdar Etropole	22	(7)
2008–2009	Chavdar Byala Slatina	29	(4)
2009–2011	Vidima-Rakovski	54	(4)
2012–	Sportist Svoge		
- * Club domestic league appearances and goals as of 30 May 2011

Vladimir Vladimirov (born 21 September 1986) is a Bulgarian football winger who played for Sportist Svoge. He has been a coach for youth programs at CSKA Sofia and PFC Levski Sofia.
