= Romário (footballer, born 1990) =

Brazilian footballer

Personal information
- Full name: Romário Vieira da Silva
- Date of birth: 9 November 1990 (age 35)
- Place of birth: Palmeira dos Índios, Brazil
- Height: 1.81 m (5 ft 11 in)
- Position: Midfielder

Team information
- Current team: Marília

Senior career*
Years	Team	Apps	(Gls)
2009–2011	São Caetano	16	(0)
2011	Santo André	3	(0)
2012–2013	Oeste	9	(0)
2013	Ituano	1	(0)
2014	Grêmio Anápolis	14	(1)
2015	Rio Branco-SP	17	(0)
2016	Icasa	7	(2)
2016	Marília	9	(0)
2016–2017	Coras	9	(0)
2018	Patrocinense	4	(0)
2019	Guarany de Sobral	4	(0)
2019	Caldense	5	(0)
2019	Gama	14	(1)
2019	URT	12	(0)
2022–2023	Comercial	37	(0)
2024–	Marília	16	(1)
- * Club domestic league appearances and goals as of 14 November 2024

Romário Vieira da Silva (born 9 November 1990) is a Brazilian footballer who plays for Marília.
