= Grisha Ivanov =

Bulgarian footballer

Personal information
- Full name: Grisha Valentinov Ivanov
- Date of birth: 16 January 1985 (age 41)
- Place of birth: Plovdiv, Bulgaria
- Height: 1.83 m (6 ft 0 in)
- Position: Striker

Team information
- Current team: Brestnik 1948
- Number: 7

Senior career*
Years	Team	Apps	(Gls)
2004–2007	Botev Plovdiv	38	(7)
2007–2009	Brestnik 1948		
2009–2010	Kaliakra Kavarna	25	(5)
2010–	Brestnik 1948		
- * Club domestic league appearances and goals as of 12 June 2010

Grisha Ivanov (Bulgarian: Гриша Иванов; born 16 January 1985) is a football striker from the Bulgaria currently playing for Brestnik 1948. He was raised in Botev Plovdiv's youth teams.
