= Maksim Stoykov =

Bulgarian footballer

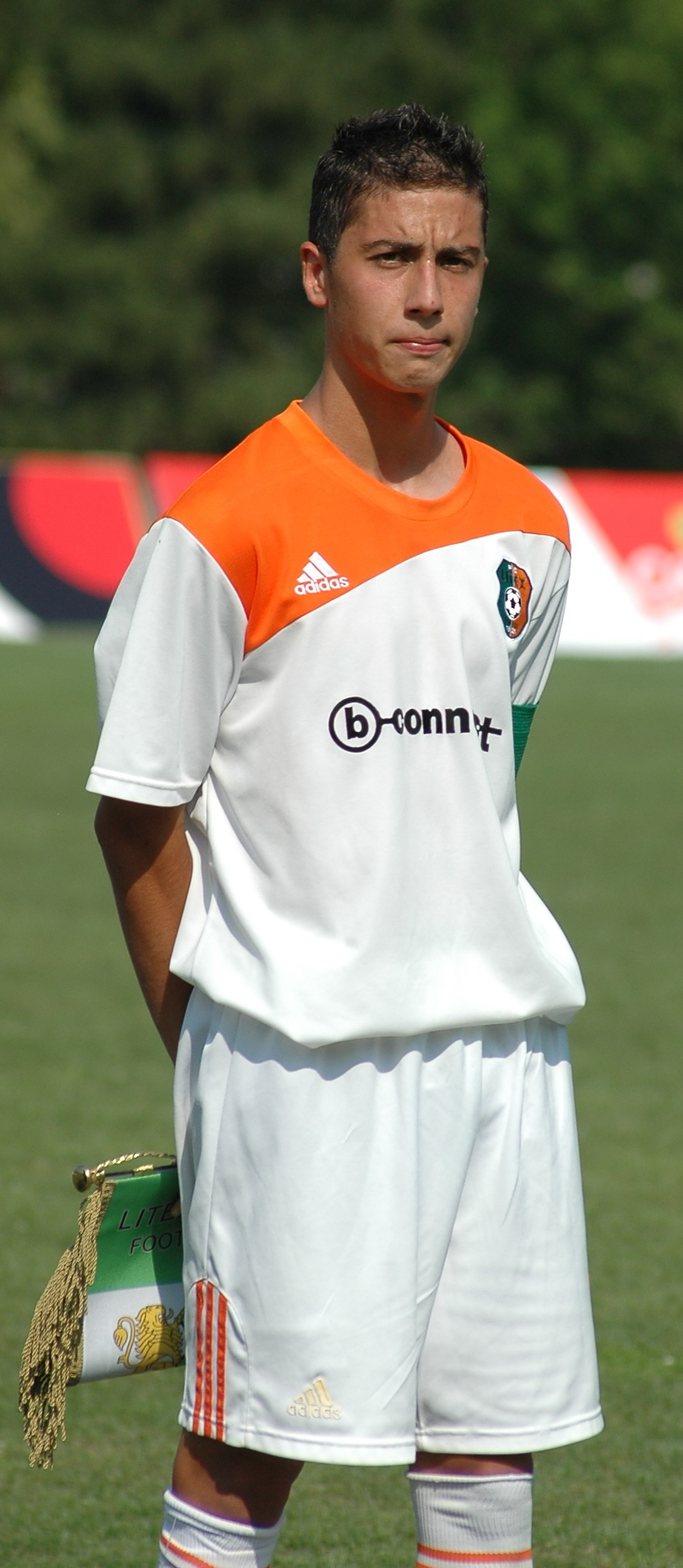

Personal information
- Full name: Maksim Tsochev Stoykov
- Date of birth: 13 January 1991 (age 35)
- Place of birth: Troyan, Bulgaria
- Position: Midfielder

Youth career
- Litex Lovech

Senior career*
Years	Team	Apps	(Gls)
2008–2011	Litex Lovech	2	(0)
2010–2011	→ Brestnik 1948 (loan)	9	(0)
2011–2012	Slavia Sofia	2	(0)
2012	→ Vidima-Rakovski (loan)	13	(0)
2013–2014	Vidima-Rakovski	27	(2)
2014	Oborishte	6	(0)
- * Club domestic league appearances and goals as of 25 February 2015

Maksim Stoykov (Bulgarian: Максим Стойков; born 13 January 1991) is a Bulgarian footballer who plays as a midfielder.
