= Boris Kondev =

Bulgarian footballer

Personal information
- Full name: Boris Ivanov Kondev
- Date of birth: 29 August 1979 (age 47)
- Place of birth: Kyustendil, Bulgaria
- Height: 1.81 m (5 ft 11 1/2 in)
- Position: Forward

Senior career*
Years	Team	Apps	(Gls)
1999–2000	Dobrudzha Dobrich	5	(0)
2000–2001	SV Meppen	25	(8)
2001–2002	Fortuna Düsseldorf	26	(6)
2002–2003	Dobrudzha Dobrich	29	(8)
2004	Wisła Płock	1	(0)
2004–2006	Lokomotiv Sofia	30	(6)
2006	Rodopa Smolyan	4	(0)
2007	Stavanger IF		
2008	Pirin Blagoevgrad	14	(10)
2009	Irtysh Pavlodar	2	(0)
2009–2011	Pirin Blagoevgrad	42	(10)
2011	Turan Tovuz	9	(1)
2011	Montana	10	(1)
2012	Lokomotiv Sofia	13	(1)
2013–2015	Pirin Razlog	42	(10)
- * Club domestic league appearances and goals

Boris Kondev (Bulgarian: Борис Кондев; born 29 August 1979) is a Bulgarian former professional footballer who played as a forward.

== Career ==
Kondev previously played for Lokomotiv Sofia, Rodopa Smolyan and Pirin Blagoevgrad in the A PFG, for Irtysh Pavlodar in the Kazakhstan Premier League and for Turan Tovuz in the Azerbaijan Premier League.
