= Hristo Bahtarliev =

Bulgarian footballer

Personal information
- Full name: Hristo Vasilev Bahtarliev
- Date of birth: 11 May 1986 (age 40)
- Place of birth: Petrich, Bulgaria
- Height: 1.87 m (6 ft 2 in)
- Position: Goalkeeper

Team information
- Current team: CSKA Sofia II (Goalkeeping Coach)

Youth career
- –2005: CSKA Sofia

Senior career*
Years	Team	Apps	(Gls)
2006–2008	Belasitsa Petrich	41	(0)
2008–2010	Montana	29	(0)
2010–2011	Vihren Sandanski	20	(0)
2011	Kaliakra Kavarna	21	(0)
2012	Malesh Mikrevo	14	(0)
2012–2015	Pirin Blagoevgrad	68	(0)
2015	Belasitsa Petrich	2	(0)
2015	Serres	?	(?)
2016–2017	Karperi	?	(?)
2017	CSKA 1948	7	(0)
2018	Belasitsa Petrich	?	(?)
- * Club domestic league appearances and goals as of 16:02, 3 October 2017 (UTC)

Hristo Bahtarliev (Bulgarian: Христо Бахтарлиев; born 11 May 1986) is a Bulgarian football goalkeeper for Belasitsa Petrich.
