= Anton Petrov (footballer, born 1985) =

Bulgarian footballer

Personal information
- Full name: Anton Ivanov Petrov
- Date of birth: 11 March 1985 (age 41)
- Place of birth: Sofia, Bulgaria
- Height: 1.73 m (5 ft 8 in)
- Position: Right back

Senior career*
Years	Team	Apps	(Gls)
2004–2005	Vihren Sandanski	10	(1)
2005–2007	Spartak Pleven	2	(0)
2007–2010	Chavdar Etropole	69	(11)
2010–2011	Kaliakra Kavarna	37	(0)
2012	Botev Vratsa	7	(0)
2012–2013	Vitosha Bistritsa	13	(0)
- * Club domestic league appearances and goals

Anton Petrov (Bulgarian: Антон Петров; born 11 March 1985) is a former Bulgarian footballer, who played as a defender.
