= Ivaylo Radentsov =

Bulgarian footballer

Personal information
- Full name: Ivaylo Ichkov Radentsov
- Date of birth: 29 May 1983 (age 43)
- Place of birth: Pleven, Bulgaria
- Height: 1.82 m (6 ft 0 in)
- Position: Midfielder

Team information
- Current team: Levski 2007
- Number: 8

Youth career
- 1993–2002: Spartak Pleven

Senior career*
Years	Team	Apps	(Gls)
2002–2004	Spartak Pleven	13	(1)
2004–2006	Akademik Svishtov	32	(4)
2006–2008	Spartak Pleven	45	(13)
2008–2010	Vidima-Rakovski	53	(8)
2010–2011	Kaliakra Kavarna	43	(1)
2012	Botev Vratsa	8	(0)
2012–2013	Spartak Pleven	23	(5)
2013–2017	Dunav Ruse	99	(14)
2017–2018	Litex Lovech	27	(0)
2018–2020	Spartak Pleven	?	(4)
2020–	Levski 2007	?	(2)
- * Club domestic league appearances and goals as of 6 October 2022

Ivaylo Ichkov Radentsov (Bulgarian: Ивайло Раденцов; born 29 May 1983, in Pleven) is a Bulgarian football player who plays as a midfielder for Levski 2007.

== Career ==
Radentsov played for Dunav Ruse before moving to Litex Lovech in June 2017. He left the club at the end of the 2017–18 season when his contract expired.

In July 2018, Radentsov returned to Spartak Pleven.
