= Neném (footballer, born 1986) =

Brazilian footballer

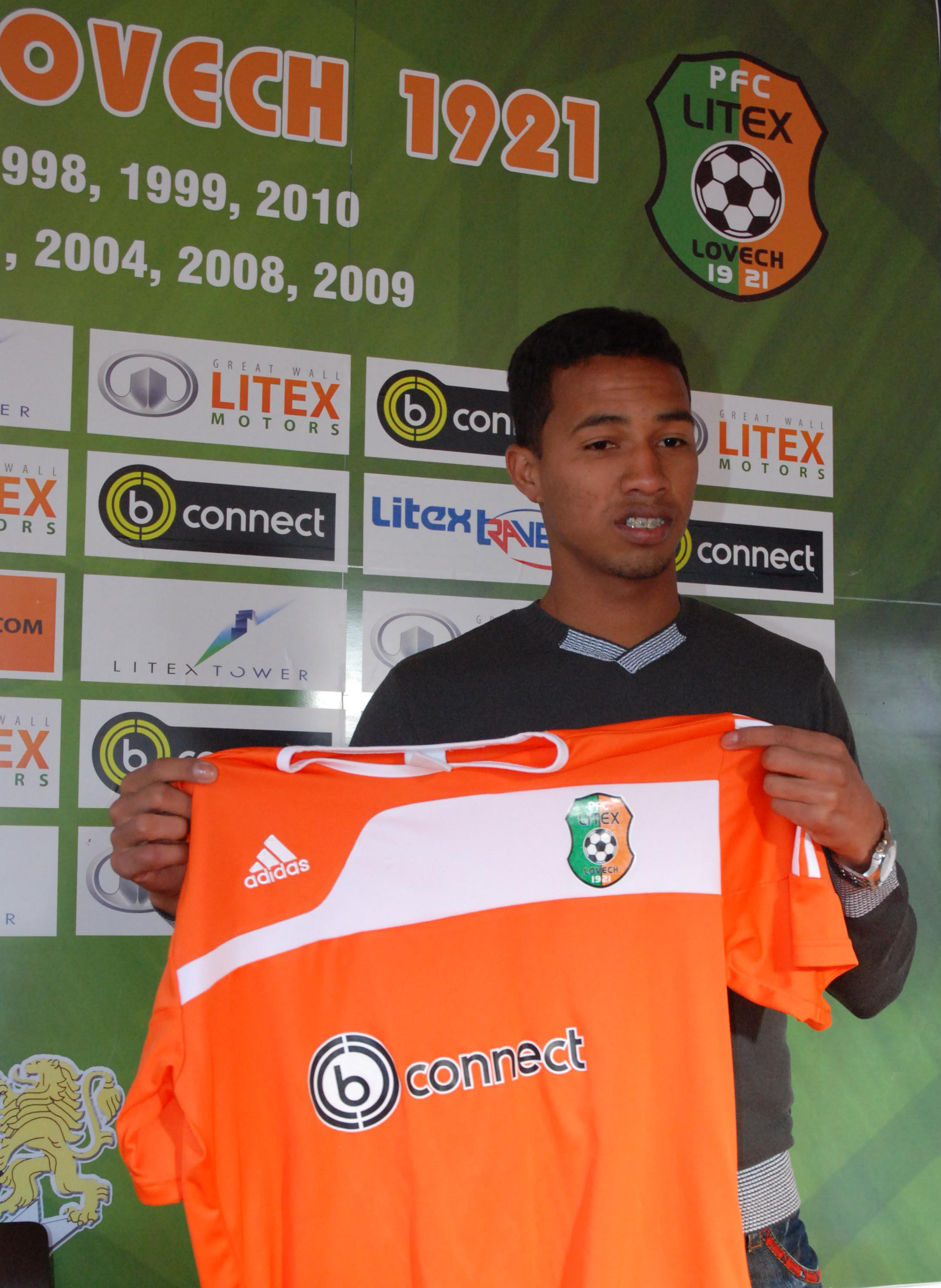

Personal information
- Full name: Jose Maria Carneiro da Silva
- Date of birth: 20 September 1986 (age 40)
- Place of birth: Sena Madureira, Brazil
- Height: 1.80 m (5 ft 11 in)
- Position: Midfielder

Team information
- Current team: Atlético Acreano

Youth career
- União de Rondonópolis
- Rio Branco

Senior career*
Years	Team	Apps	(Gls)
2007–2010	Rio Branco	12	(0)
2011	Litex Lovech	0	(0)
2011	→ Botev Vratsa (loan)	10	(0)
2012	Boa EC	0	(0)
2013	Penapolense	?	(?)
2014	Mixto	0	(0)
2014–2015	Atlético Acreano	8	(1)
- * Club domestic league appearances and goals as of October 10, 2014

Jose Maria Carneiro da Silva (born September 20, 1986 in Sena Madureira, Brazil), known as Neném, is a Brazilian football midfielder currently playing for Atlético Acreano.

== Career ==
Neném played for União de Rondonópolis and Rio Branco, before he signed with Bulgarian Litex Lovech. After a short loan period at Botev Vratsa, he returned to Brazil, continuing his career with local clubs.
