= Mohamed Tawakol =

Egyptian footballer (born 1990)

Personal information
- Full name: Mohamed Wahid Tawakol
- Date of birth: 1990 (age 35–36)
- Place of birth: Tanta, Egypt
- Position: Striker

Senior career*
Years	Team	Apps	(Gls)
2010–2011	Al-Ahly B	?	(?)
2011	Svetkavitsa	11	(1)
2012–	El Mostaqbal	?	(?)
2013–	→ Tanta FC (loan)	?	(?)
- * Club domestic league appearances and goals as of 1 December 2011

Mohamed Wahid Tawakol (born 1990 in Tanta) is an Egyptian footballer who plays as a striker.

On 9 September 2011, Tawakol scored Svetkavitsa's first-ever A PFG goal, in a 4–1 away loss against Lokomotiv Sofia.
