= Vasil Velev =

Bulgarian footballer

Personal information
- Full name: Vasil Dimitrov Velev
- Date of birth: 15 January 1984 (age 42)
- Place of birth: Stara Zagora, Bulgaria
- Height: 1.76 m (5 ft 9 1/2 in)
- Position: Defensive midfielder

Team information
- Current team: Botev Ihtiman
- Number: 7

Senior career*
Years	Team	Apps	(Gls)
2005–2006	Spartak Varna	11	(0)
2006–2007	Minyor Pernik	12	(1)
2007–2008	Loko St. Zagora	24	(3)
2008–2010	Sliven 2000	13	(1)
2009	→ Loko St. Zagora (loan)	14	(0)
2010–2011	Vidima-Rakovski	26	(0)
2011–2012	Lokomotiv Sofia	28	(0)
2013	Botev Vratsa	22	(0)
2014	Haskovo	19	(0)
2015	Oborishte	13	(0)
2015–	Botev Ihtiman	1	(0)
- * Club domestic league appearances and goals as of 30 August 2015

Vasil Velev (Bulgarian: Васил Велев; born 15 January 1984) is a Bulgarian footballer who plays as a midfielder for Botev Ihtiman.
