= Boyan Peykov =

Bulgarian footballer

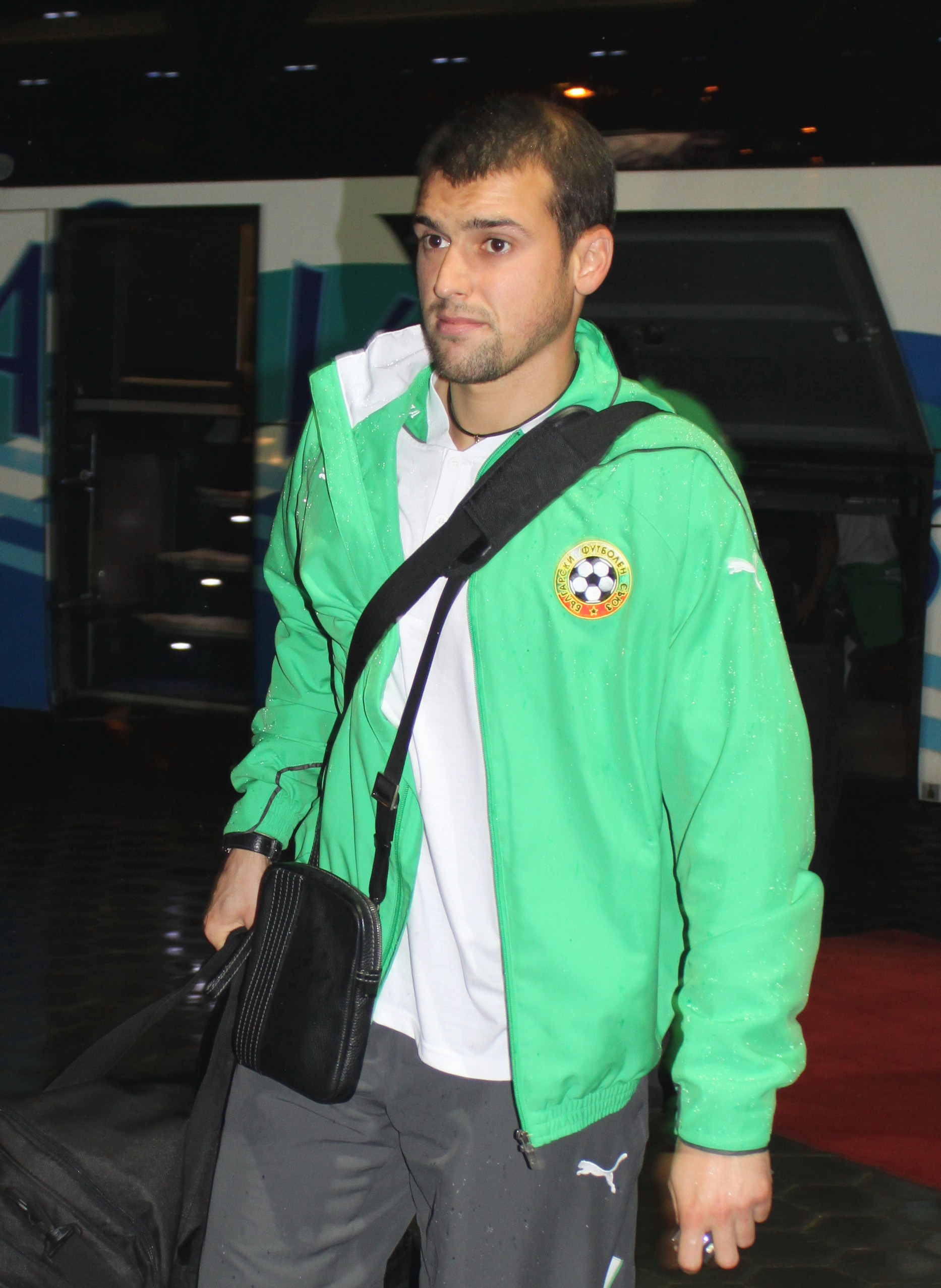

Personal information
- Full name: Boyan Goshev Peykov
- Date of birth: 1 May 1984 (age 42)
- Place of birth: Harmanli, Bulgaria
- Height: 1.85 m (6 ft 1 in)
- Position: Goalkeeper

Team information
- Current team: Cherno More (goalkeeping coach)

Youth career
- Levski Sofia

Senior career*
Years	Team	Apps	(Gls)
2003–2004	Conegliano	7	(0)
2004–2005	Nesebar	12	(0)
2005–2006	Vidima-Rakovski	21	(0)
2006	Nesebar	7	(0)
2007	Dunav Ruse	9	(0)
2007–2009	Minyor Radnevo	39	(0)
2009–2010	Beroe Stara Zagora	23	(0)
2010–2011	Lokomotiv Sofia	26	(0)
2012	Zawisza Bydgoszcz	4	(0)
2012–2013	Minyor Pernik	25	(0)
2013	Litex Lovech	0	(0)
2014	Haskovo	9	(0)
2015	Lokomotiv Sofia	1	(0)
2015–2016	Tsarsko Selo	5	(0)
Total		188	(0)

International career
2011	Bulgaria	1	(0)

Managerial career
- 2015–2017: Tsarsko Selo (goalkeeping coach)
- 2017: Vereya (goalkeeping coach)
- 2018–: Cherno More (goalkeeping coach)
- * Club domestic league appearances and goals

Boyan Goshev Peykov (Bulgarian Cyrillic: Боян Гошев Пейков; born 1 May 1984) is a Bulgarian former professional footballer who played as a goalkeeper. He is currently the goalkeeping coach of Cherno More Varna.

== Club career ==
Peykov had previously played for Conegliano German, Nesebar, Vidima-Rakovski, Dunav Rousse, Minyor Radnevo and Beroe Stara Zagora. With Beroe he won Bulgarian Cup for 2009–10 season. Peykov signed with Litex Lovech in August 2013 as a cover for Evgeni Aleksandrov after their first choice goalkeeper Ilko Pirgov had sustained an injury.

On 4 November 2016, following a 2–3 home defeat by Pomorie, Peykov was released by Tsarsko Selo Sofia as a player. Peykov continued to be the goalkeeping coach in the team.

== International career ==
Peykov earned his only cap for Bulgaria on 9 February 2011 in the 2–2 away draw with Estonia in a friendly match after coming on as a second-half substitute for Nikolay Mihaylov.

== Honours ==
Beroe Stara Zagora

- Bulgarian Cup: 2009–10
