= Romario (footballer, born 1990) =

Brazilian footballer

Personal information
- Full name: Romario da Silva Resende
- Date of birth: 3 December 1990 (age 35)
- Place of birth: São Paulo, Brazil
- Height: 1.75 m (5 ft 9 in)
- Position: Attacking midfielder

Youth career
- Portuguesa

Senior career*
Years	Team	Apps	(Gls)
2008–2009	Força EC	11	(1)
2009	ECO-SP	?	(?)
2009	Paulistano	?	(?)
2010	Fabril-MG	?	(?)
2010	Radium Mococa	28	(14)
2011-2012	Beroe Stara Zagora	5	(1)
2012-2013	FC Doxa Dramas	27	(8)
2013-2019	no club		
- * Club domestic league appearances and goals

Romario da Silva Resende known as Romario (born 3 December 1990, in São Paulo) is a Brazilian football forward.

He previously played for Beroe Stara Zagora in Bulgaria. On 7 May he scored his single goal for the club in a 3–1 away win against Akademik Sofia.
