= Dimitar Grabchev =

Bulgarian footballer

Personal information
- Date of birth: 10 May 1990 (age 36)
- Place of birth: Bulgaria
- Height: 1.88 m (6 ft 2 in)
- Position: Goalkeeper

Youth career
- Maritsa Plovdiv

Senior career*
Years	Team	Apps	(Gls)
2007–2010	Maritsa Plovdiv	9	(0)
2011–2012	Lokomotiv Plovdiv	0	(0)
2011	→ Pirin GD (loan)	5	(0)
2012–2013	Svilengrad	?	(0)
2014	Oborishte	1	(0)
2014	Rakovski	5	(0)
2015–2016	Borislav		
2017	Hebar		
2017–2018	Maritsa Plovdiv	0	(0)
- * Club domestic league appearances and goals as of 8 December 2014

Dimitar Grabchev (Bulgarian: Димитър Грабчев; born 10 May 1990) is a Bulgarian footballer who currently plays as a goalkeeper His first club was Maritsa Plovdiv.

== Career ==
In June 2017, Grabchev joined his hometown club Maritsa Plovdiv. He left the club at the end of the 2017–18 season following the relegation to Third League.
