= Martin Sechkov =

Bulgarian footballer

Personal information
- Full name: Martin Valentinov Sechkov
- Date of birth: 17 November 1986 (age 39)
- Place of birth: Kyustendil, Bulgaria
- Height: 1.88 m (6 ft 2 in)
- Position: Centre back

Senior career*
Years	Team	Apps	(Gls)
2002–2004	Velbazhd Kyustendil	-	(-)
2004–2010	Lokomotiv Plovdiv	58	(5)
2004	→ Minyor BD (loan)	-	(-)
2005–2006	→ Minyor Pernik (loan)	19	(0)
2010	Akademik Sofia	14	(0)
2011	Slavia Sofia	8	(0)
2011	Etar 1924	7	(0)
2012–2013	Montana	21	(1)
2013	Neftochimic 1986	7	(0)
2014	Pirin Razlog	26	(2)
2015	Lokomotiv Plovdiv	11	(0)
2015–2016	Septemvri Simitli	21	(0)
2017	Sozopol	25	(3)
2018–2019	Hebar Pazardzhik	46	(6)
- * Club domestic league appearances and goals

Martin Sechkov (Bulgarian: Мартин Сечков; born 17 November 1986) is a former Bulgarian footballer, who played as a defender.

He played as a centre back from 2002 to 2019, amassing over 120 appearances in the Bulgarian First League for Lokomotiv Plovdiv, Akademik Sofia, Slavia Sofia, Montana and Neftochimic 1986. He also played for Velbazhd Kyustendil, Minyor Pernik, Etar 1924, Pirin Razlog, Septemvri Simitli, Sozopol and Hebar Pazardzhik.
