= Ivan Todorov (footballer) =

Bulgarian footballer

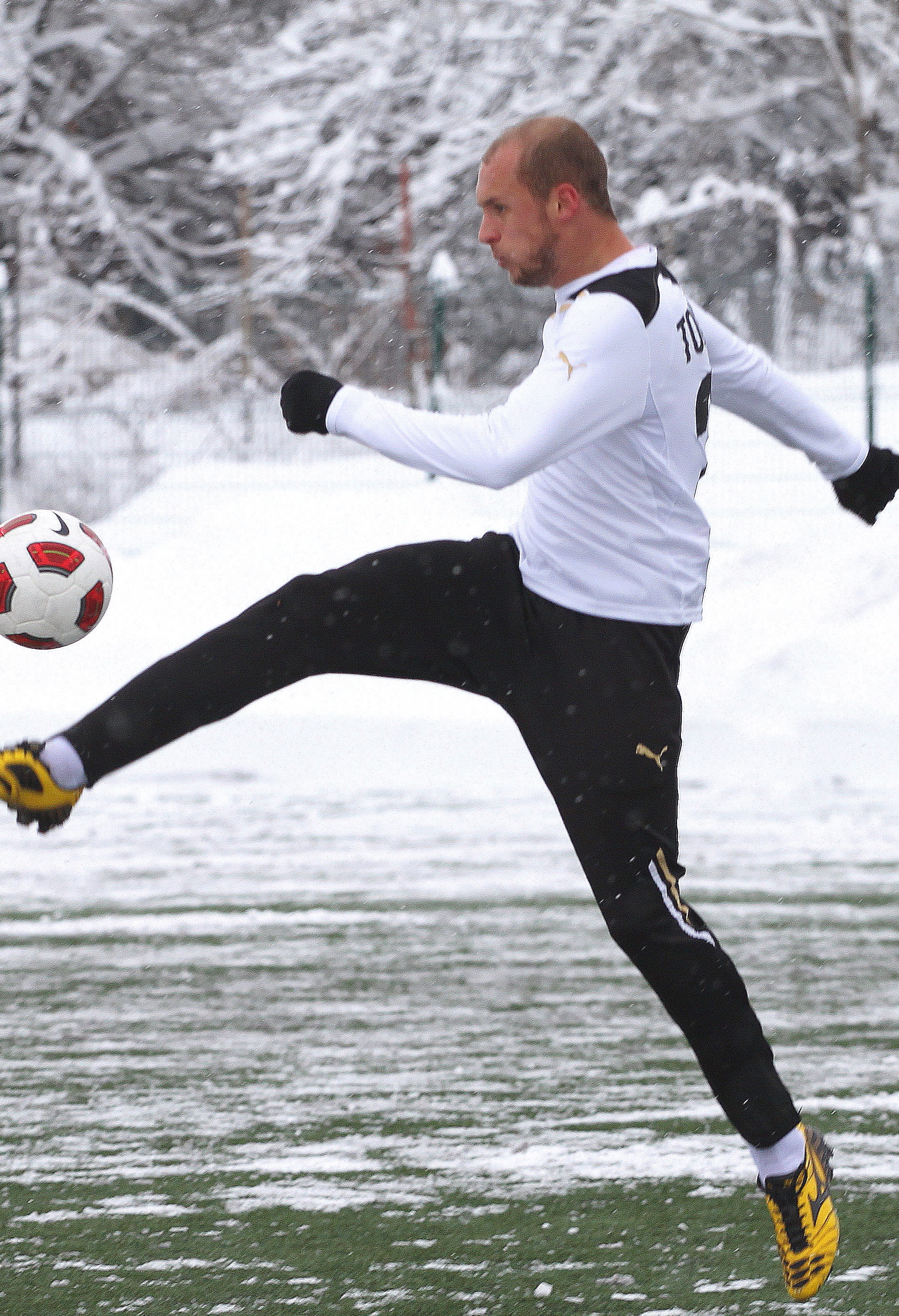

Personal information
- Full name: Ivan Nikolov Todorov
- Date of birth: 27 March 1987 (age 39)
- Place of birth: Godech, PR Bulgaria
- Height: 1.80 m (5 ft 11 in)
- Position: Defender

Youth career
- FK Kom Godech
- 2005–2006: Levski Sofia

Senior career*
| Years | Team | Apps | (Gls) |
| 2006 | Levski Sofia | 1 | (0) |
| 2006–2007 | Rodopa Smolyan | 24 | (0) |
| 2007–2010 | Vidima-Rakovski | 46 | (0) |
| 2010–2011 | Chernomorets Pomorie | 23 | (0) |
| 2011–2012 | Slavia Sofia | 4 | (0) |
| 2011 | → Vidima-Rakovski (loan) | 9 | (0) |
| 2012 | Sliven | 8 | (0) |
| 2013–2017 | WSC Hertha Wels | 117 | (2) |
| 2017–2019 | Kariana | 6 | (2) |
| 2020 | OFC Kom Berkovitsa | | |
- * Club domestic league appearances and goals as of 1 June 2019

Ivan Todorov (Bulgarian: Иван Тодоров; born 27 March 1987) is a Bulgarian former professional footballer who played as a defender.

== Career ==
The defender previously played for Levski Sofia and Slavia Sofia in the A PFG. He also played for several Bulgarian lower league clubs, including Rodopa Smolyan, Vidima-Rakovski, Chernomorets Pomorie and OFC Sliven 2000.

Todorov also played in Austria for WSC Hertha Wels.

In July 2017, Todorov joined Kariana Erden.

He later joined OFC Kom before retiring on 1 July 2020, at the age of 33.
