= Todor Todorov (footballer, born May 1982) =

Bulgarian footballer

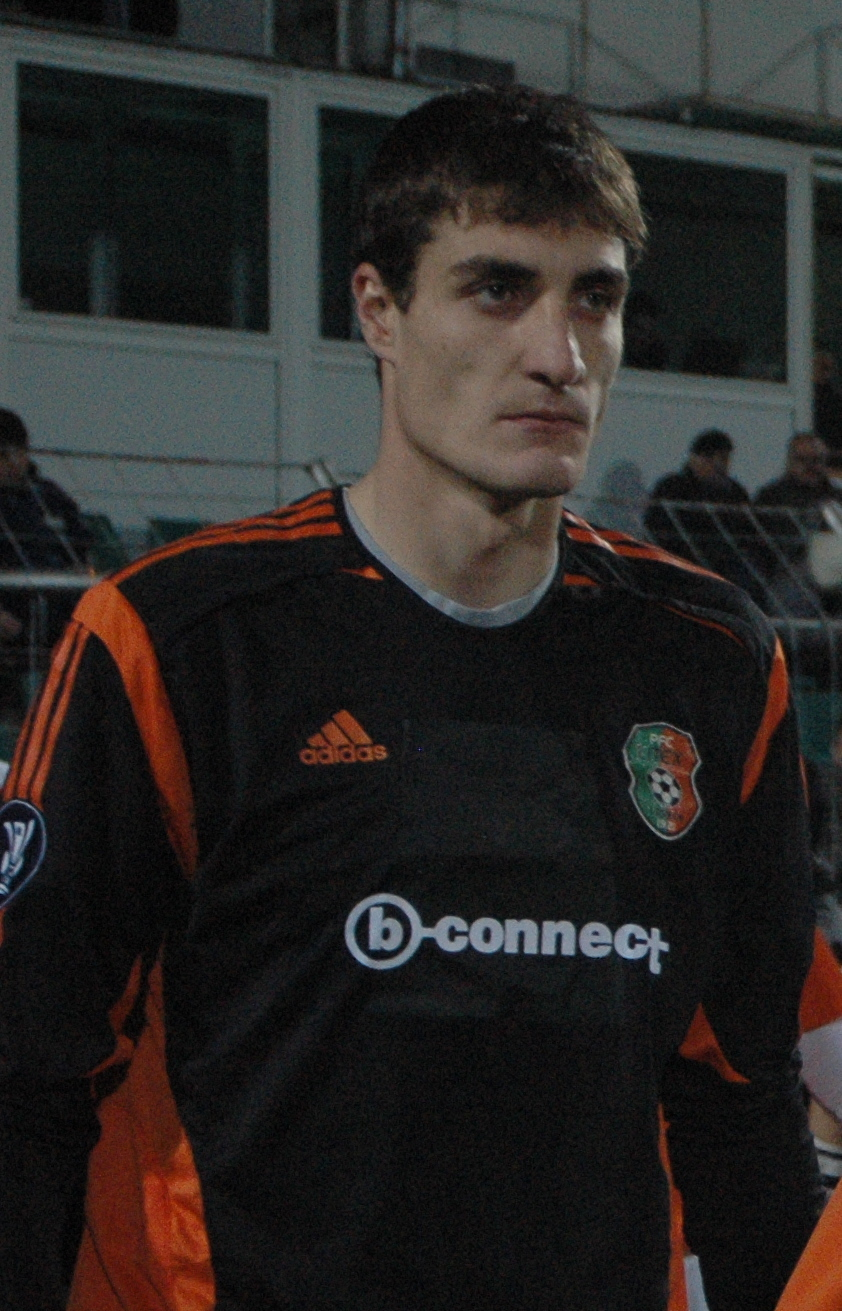

Personal information
- Full name: Todor Tankov Todorov
- Date of birth: 9 May 1982 (age 44)
- Place of birth: Byala, Bulgaria
- Height: 1.98 m (6 ft 6 in)
- Position: Goalkeeper

Team information
- Current team: Volov-Shumen 2007
- Number: 1

Senior career*
Years	Team	Apps	(Gls)
2002	Lokomotiv 101	?	(?)
2002–2003	Lokomotiv Dryanovo	?	(?)
2003–2004	Cherno More	0	(0)
2004–2005	Spartak Pleven	0	(0)
2005–2010	Litex Lovech	62	(0)
2010	→ Sliven (loan)	12	(0)
2010–2011	Lokomotiv Plovdiv	5	(0)
2011	Dorostol Silistra	3	(0)
2012	Svetkavitsa	4	(0)
2012–2013	Shumen 2010	11	(0)
2015–2018	Botev Novi Pazar	?	(?)
2019–2021	Svetkavitsa	11	(0)
2022	Botev Novi Pazar	3	(0)
2022–2023	Svetkavitsa	4	(0)
2024–	Volov-Shumen 2007	7	(0)
- * Club domestic league appearances and goals as of 1 July 2019

Todor Todorov (Bulgarian: Тодор Тодоров; born 9 May 1982) is a Bulgarian footballer who plays as a goalkeeper for Volov-Shumen 2007. He is known for his skill in saving penalties.

== Awards ==
=== Litex ===
- Bulgarian A PFG - 2009/2010
- Bulgarian Cup - 2008, 2009
- UEFA Cup 2005-06: Group-stage
