= Nikola Minkov =

Bulgarian footballer

- Born: 4 May 1987 (age 39); Sofia, Bulgaria
- Education: University of National and World Economy
- Occupations: Marketing specialist SEO optimization expert
- Known for: SEO Аgency Serpact
- Spouse: Katya Minkova
- Children: 2
Association football career
- Height: 1.83 m (6 ft 0 in)
- Position: Defensive midfielder
Youth career
- 1995–2006: Septemvri Sofia
Senior career*
Years	Team	Apps	(Gls)
2006–2007	Svilengrad	64	(0)
2007	Montana	4	(0)
2008	Septemvri Sofia	4	(0)
2008–2009	Minyor Bobov dol	4	(0)
2009–2011	Svilengrad	72	(4)
2011	Kaliakra Kavarna	1	(0)
2012	Akademik Sofia	12	(2)
Total		201	(6)
- * Club domestic league appearances and goals

Nikola Minkov (Bulgarian: Никола Минков; born 4 May 1987) is a former Bulgarian footballer who played as a midfielder, and now works in marketing and SEO optimization.

== Football career ==
Minkov spent his childhood in the professional association football club Septemvri Sofia. In 2006 he was transferred to Svilengrad 1921 and after that he wore the team colors of Montana, Septemvri, Minyor Bobov Dol, Kaliakra Kavarna, Akademik Sofia. He ended his football career at the age of 25 in 2012.

=== Career statistics ===
Club	Season	Leagues		Cups		Europe		Total	
Club	Season	Apps	Goals	Apps	Goals	Apps	Goals	Apps	Goals
Svilengrad	2005–06	20	0	0	0	–	–	20	0
Svilengrad	2006–07	44	0	0	0	–	–	44	0
Montana	2007–08	4	0	0	0	–	–	4	0
Septemvri Sofia	2007–08	4	0	0	0	–	–	4	0
Minyor Bobov Dol	2008–09	44	0	0	0	–	–	44	0
Svilengrad	2009–10	28	4	0	0	–	–	28	4
Svilengrad	2010–11	44	0	0	0	–	–	44	0
Kaliakra Kavarna	2011–12	1	0	1	0	–	–	2	0
Akademik Sofia	2011–12	12	2	0	0	–	–	12	2
Career totals		201	6	1	0	0	0	202	6

== Education ==
Nikola Minkov graduated from the University of National and World Economy:

== Digital Marketing Career ==
- Founder of SEO Аgency Serpact in 2014.
