= Victor Deniran =

Nigerian footballer

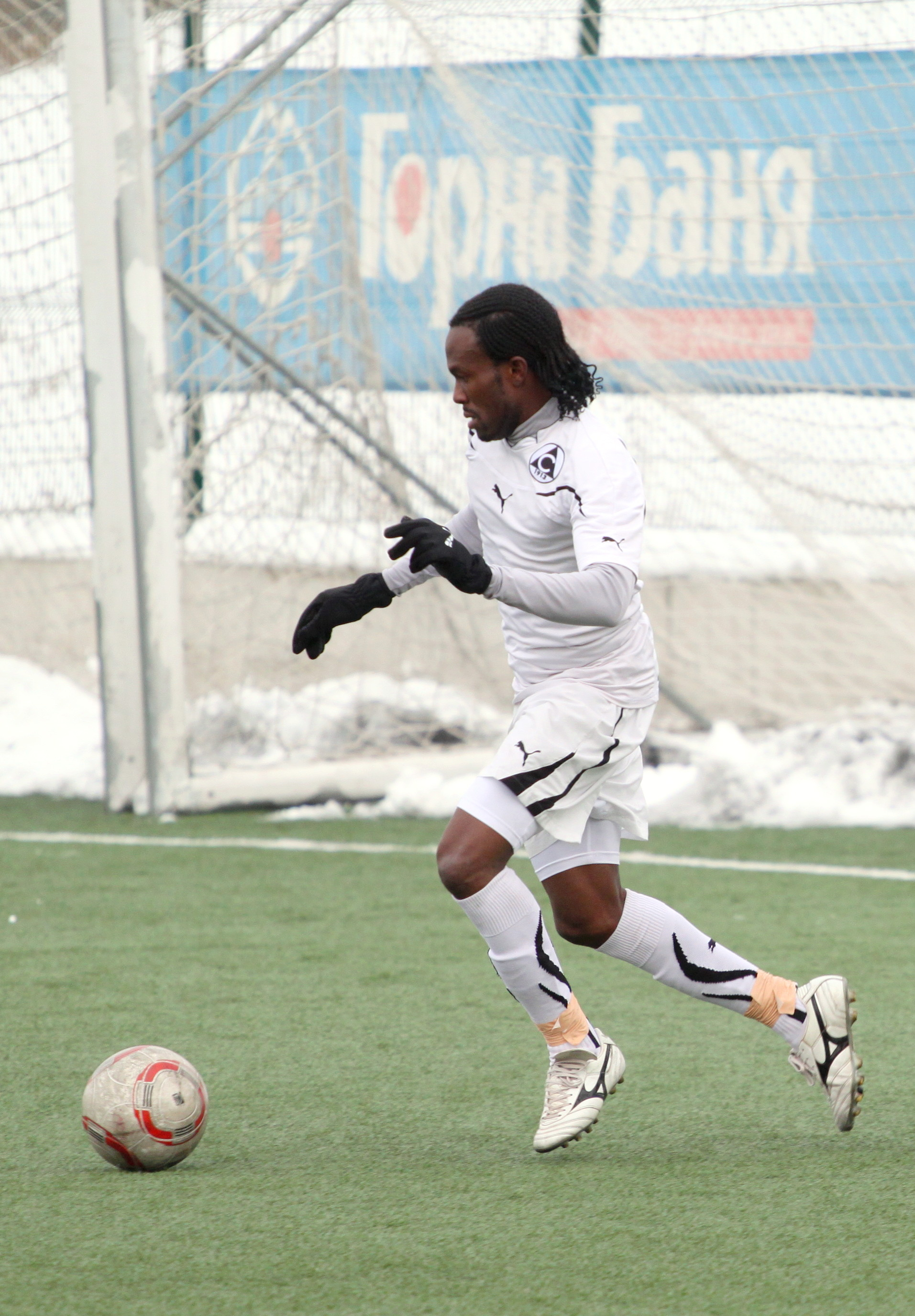

Personal information
- Full name: Victor Ochuko Deniran
- Date of birth: 27 May 1990 (age 36)
- Place of birth: Lagos, Nigeria
- Height: 1.70 m (5 ft 7 in)
- Position: Left-back

Youth career
- First Bank

Senior career*
Years	Team	Apps	(Gls)
2008–2011	Slavia Sofia	36	(1)
2009–2010	→ Sportist Svoge (loan)	21	(0)
2011	→ Botev Vratsa (loan)	14	(1)
2012–2013	Montana	15	(0)
- * Club domestic league appearances and goals as of 6 June 2013

Victor Deniran (born 27 May 1990) is a Nigerian footballer who plays as a defender.

== Career ==
Deniran started his career at Nigerian First Bank F.C. In the winter of 2008, Deniran went on a trial period with Slavia Sofia in Bulgaria and six months later signed his first professional contract with the club. He was given the No.14 shirt. He made his official debut in the Bulgarian first division in a match against Litex Lovech on 9 August 2008. Victor played for 90 minutes. The result of the match was a 0–3 loss for Slavia.

== Personal life ==
His brother Ortega Deniran plays for Edinburgh City F.C. as a forward.
