= Antonio Pavlov =

Bulgarian footballer

Antonio Pavlov Антонио Павлов
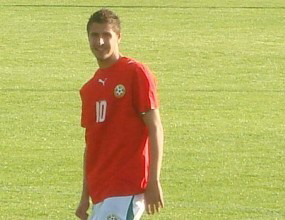

Personal information
- Full name: Antonio Rumenov Pavlov
- Date of birth: 2 September 1988 (age 38)
- Place of birth: Sofia, Bulgaria
- Height: 1.88 m (6 ft 2 in)
- Position: Forward

Youth career
- Levski Sofia

Senior career*
Years	Team	Apps	(Gls)
2005–2008	Levski Sofia	1	(1)
2006–2007	→ Kaliakra Kavarna (loan)	4	(1)
2007–2010	Vidima-Rakovski	72	(55)
2010	Slavia Sofia	3	(0)
2011	Ludogorets Razgrad	7	(1)
2011	Hapoel Jerusalem	3	(0)
2012–2013	Lokomotiv Sofia	32	(7)
2013–2014	Maccabi Yavne	25	(7)
2014–2015	Conegliano German	?	(1)
2015–2016	Septemvri Sofia	11	(1)
- * Club domestic league appearances and goals as of 1 February 2016

Antonio Pavlov (Bulgarian: Антонио Павлов; born 2 September 1988) is a Bulgarian footballer, who plays as a forward.

== Career ==
A product of the Levski Sofia youth system, Pavlov spent some years on loans at smaller teams as Sportist Svoge, Kaliakra Kavarna and Chavdar Byala Slatina.

On 26 July 2011, he joined Hapoel Jerusalem on a one-year deal. On 29 September 2012, Pavlov scored a last-minute goal against his youth club Levski Sofia to level the score at 1:1 in an A PFG match.
