= 2017–18 Second Professional Football League (Bulgaria) =

Second Professional Football League
- Season: 2017–18
- Dates: 22 July 2017–19 May 2018
- Champions: Botev Vratsa
- Promoted: Botev Vratsa
- Relegated: Neftochimic; Sozopol; Maritsa Plovdiv; Oborishte
- Matches: 240
- Goals: 592 (2.47 per match)
- Top goalscorer: Svetoslav Dikov (25)
- Biggest home win: Botev Vratsa 5–0 Ludogorets Razgrad II (28 April 2018)
- Biggest away win: Sozopol 0–5 Montana (20 October 2017)
- Highest scoring: Strumska Slava 3–6 Maritsa Plovdiv (12 August 2017)
- Longest winning run: 7 games by Tsarsko Selo
- Longest unbeaten run: 11 games by Tsarsko Selo
- Longest winless run: 19 games by Neftochimic
- Longest losing run: 12 games by Neftochimic
- All statistics correct as of 19 May 2018.

The 2017–18 Second League was the 62nd season of the Second League, the second tier of the Bulgarian football league system, and the 2nd season under this name and current league structure. The fixture list was released on 22 June 2017.

== Teams ==
The following teams have changed division since the 2016–17 season.

=== To Second League ===
Promoted from Third League

- Chernomorets Balchik
- Maritsa Plovdiv^{a}
- Litex
- Strumska Slava

Relegated from First League

- Lokomotiv Gorna Oryahovitsa
- Montana
- Neftochimic

=== From Second League ===
Relegated to Third League

- CSKA Sofia II^{b}
- Spartak Pleven
- Bansko
- Levski Karlovo

Promoted to First League

- Etar
- Septemvri Sofia
- Vitosha Bistritsa

a.Zagorets, the champions of South-East Third League, declined promotion due to financial and organizational reasons; Maritsa Plovdiv took their place as runners-up.
b.CSKA Sofia II officially declined to participate in the South-West Third League and was dissolved.

== Stadia and locations ==
Location of teams in 2017–18 Second League

Team	City	Stadium	Capacity
Botev	Galabovo	Energitik	3,000
Botev	Vratsa	Hristo Botev	12,000
Chernomorets	Balchik	Gradski, Balchik	3,100
Litex	Lovech	Gradski, Lovech	8,100
Lokomotiv	Gorna Oryahovitsa	Lokomotiv, Gorna Oryahovitsa	10,500
Lokomotiv	Sofia	Lokomotiv, Sofia	22,000
Ludogorets II	Razgrad	Eagles' Nest	2,000
Maritsa	Plovdiv	Botev 1912 Football Complex^{A}	3,500
Montana	Montana	Kiprovets, Chiprovtsi^{B}	1,600
Neftochimic	Burgas	Gradski, Balgarovo^{C}	3,000
Nesebar	Nesebar	Nesebar Stadium	7,000
Oborishte	Panagyurishte	Orcho Voyvoda	3,000
Pomorie	Pomorie	Lazur, Burgas^{D}	18,037
Sozopol	Sozopol	Arena Sozopol	3,500
Strumska Slava	Radomir	Gradski, Radomir	3,500
Tsarsko Selo	Sofia	Tsarsko Selo	2,000

A.Maritsa Plovdiv will play at Botev 1912 Football Complex because their Maritsa Stadium is not licensed for Second League.
B.Montana will play at Kiprovets Stadium in Chiprovtsi due to ongoing renovation works at their Ogosta Stadium.
C.Neftochimic will play at Gradski Stadium in Balgarovo for financial reasons.
D.Pomorie will play at Lazur Stadium in Burgas due to renovation works at their Pomorie Stadium.

== Personnel and sponsorship ==
Note: Flags indicate national team as has been defined under FIFA eligibility rules. Players and managers may hold more than one non-FIFA nationality.

Team	Manager	Captain	Kit manufacturer	Shirt sponsor	Kit sponsor
Botev Galabovo	(Bulgaria) Lyudmil Kirov	(Bulgaria) Georgi Kirilov	KRASIKO	Galabovo Municipality	Knauf
Botev Vratsa	(Bulgaria) Sasho Angelov	(Bulgaria) Ivaylo Mihaylov	Jumper	WinBet	
Chernomorets Balchik	(Bulgaria) Georgi Ivanov	(Bulgaria) Genadi Lugo	Legea	Balchik Municipality	
Litex	(Bulgaria) Zhivko Zhelev	(Bulgaria) Ivaylo Radentsov	adidas		
Lokomotiv Sofia	(Serbia) Mladen Dodić	(Bulgaria) Aleksandar Branekov	Joma	Efbet	Malizia
Lokomotiv Gorna Oryahovitsa	(Bulgaria) Aleksandar Dimitrov	(Bulgaria) Mariyan Ivanov	KRASIKO	Efbet	Prity, Enel, Go Grill
Ludogorets Razgrad II	(Bulgaria) Radoslav Zdravkov	(Bulgaria) Ventsislav Kerchev	Umbro	bet365	Vivacom, Spetema
Maritsa	(Bulgaria) Dimcho Belyakov	(Bulgaria) Iliya Nikolov	Sportika	Hristov Commerce	
Montana	(Bulgaria) Ferario Spasov	(Bulgaria) Ivan Mihov	Jako	Efbet	
Neftochimic	(Bulgaria) Diyan Petkov	(Bulgaria) Stanislav Zhekov	KRASIKO	Masterhaus	
Nesebar	(Bulgaria) Nikolay Zhechev	(Bulgaria) Nikolay Kostov	Joma	Efbet	
Oborishte	(Bulgaria) Ivan Atanasov	(Bulgaria) Tsvetomir Tsonkov	KRASIKO	Asarel Medet	
Pomorie	(Bulgaria) Veselin Branimirov	(Bulgaria) Georgi Petkov	Erreà	Pomorie Municipality, Efbet	
Sozopol	(Bulgaria) Margarit Dimov	(Bulgaria) Ivan Yanchev	KRASIKO		
Strumska Slava	(Bulgaria) Vladimir Dimitrov	(Bulgaria) Nikolay Nikolov	Sportika		
Tsarsko Selo	(Bulgaria) Velislav Vutsov	(Bulgaria) Simeon Ganchev	Nike		

Note: Individual clubs may wear jerseys with advertising. However, only one sponsorship is permitted per jersey for official tournaments organised by UEFA in addition to that of the kit manufacturer (exceptions are made for non-profit organisations). Clubs in the domestic league can have more than one sponsorship per jersey which can feature on the front of the shirt, incorporated with the main sponsor or in place of it; or on the back, either below the squad number or on the collar area. Shorts also have space available for advertisement.

== Managerial changes ==
Team	Outgoing manager	Manner of departure	Date of vacancy	Position in table	Incoming manager	Date of appointment
Oborishte	(Bulgaria) Emil Velev	End of contract	1 June 2017	Pre-season	(Bulgaria) Georgi Chilikov	9 June 2017
Lokomotiv Sofia	(Bulgaria) Yavor Valchinov	Mutual consent	2 June 2017	Pre-season	(Serbia) Mladen Dodić	9 June 2017
Neftochimic	(Bulgaria) Hristo Yanev	Resigned	3 June 2017	Pre-season	(Bulgaria) Nikolay Krastev	23 June 2017
Montana	(Bulgaria) Atanas Atanasov	End of contract	11 June 2017	Pre-season	(Bulgaria) Yavor Valchinov	14 June 2017
Botev Galabovo	(Bulgaria) Ivan Vutov	Signed by Etar	16 June 2017	Pre-season	(Bulgaria) Svetoslav Todorov	16 June 2017
Nesebar	(Bulgaria) Nikolay Rusev	Appointed as Head of Academy	18 June 2017	Pre-season	(Bulgaria) Nikolay Zhechev	18 June 2017
Oborishte	(Bulgaria) Georgi Chilikov	Signed by Ludogorets Razgrad	14 August 2017	4th	(Bulgaria) Angel Slavkov	14 August 2017
Montana	(Bulgaria) Yavor Valchinov	Resigned	27 August 2017	12th	(Bulgaria) Ferario Spasov	28 August 2017
Pomorie	(Bulgaria) Malin Orachev	Resigned	27 September 2017	14th	(Bulgaria) Veselin Branimirov	27 September 2017
Neftochimic	(Bulgaria) Nikolay Krastev	Demoted to assistant	6 October 2017	16th	(Bulgaria) Blagomir Mitrev	6 October 2017
Botev Galabovo	(Bulgaria) Svetoslav Todorov	Mutual consent	16 November 2017	12th	(Bulgaria) Lyudmil Kirov	21 November 2017
Oborishte	(Bulgaria) Angel Slavkov	Mutual consent	2 December 2017	12th	(Bulgaria) Ivan Atanasov	12 December 2017
Neftochimic	(Bulgaria) Blagomir Mitrev	Signed by Vereya	2 January 2018	16th	(Bulgaria) Diyan Petkov	3 January 2018
Tsarsko Selo	(Bulgaria) Nikola Spasov	Signed by (Kazakhstan) Kyzylzhar	3 January 2018	2nd	(Bulgaria) Veselin Velikov	3 January 2018
Sozopol	(Bulgaria) Rumen Dimov	Resigned	24 April 2018	15h	(Bulgaria) Margarit Dimov	24 April 2018
Maritsa Plovdiv	(Bulgaria) Stoyan Dimitrov	Resigned	30 April 2018	14th	(Bulgaria) Dimcho Belyakov	30 April 2018
Tsarsko Selo	(Bulgaria) Veselin Velikov	Mutual consent	8 May 2018	3rd	(Bulgaria) Velislav Vutsov	8 May 2018

== League table ==
Pos	Team	Pld	W	D	L	GF	GA	GD	Pts	Promotion, qualification or relegation
1	Botev Vratsa (C, P)	30	19	7	4	46	20	+26	64	Promotion to the First League
2	Lokomotiv Sofia	30	19	6	5	51	27	+24	63 (Note: Lokomotiv Sofia is ahead of Tsarsko Selo on head-to-head points: Lokomotiv Sofia–Tsarsko Selo 0–0, Tsarsko Selo–Lokomotiv Sofia 1–2.)	Qualification for the promotion play-offs
3	Tsarsko Selo	30	19	6	5	56	28	+28	63	Qualification for the promotion play-offs
4	Montana	30	17	5	8	50	20	+30	56	
5	Nesebar	30	13	5	12	42	43	−1	44	
6	Pomorie	30	10	11	9	36	32	+4	41 (Note: Pomorie is ahead of Botev Galabovo on head-to-head points: Pomorie–Botev Galabovo 0–0, Botev Galabovo–Pomorie 0–1.)	
7	Botev Galabovo	30	11	8	11	37	40	−3	41	
8	Lokomotiv Gorna Oryahovitsa	30	10	10	10	42	39	+3	40 (Note: Lokomotiv Gorna Oryahovitsa is ahead of Ludogorets Razgrad II on overall goal difference.)	
9	Ludogorets Razgrad II	30	11	7	12	40	50	−10	40	Ineligible for promotion
10	Litex Lovech	30	10	9	11	26	26	0	39 (Note: Litex Lovech is ahead of Chernomorets Balchik on head-to-head goal difference: Litex Lovech–Chernomorets Balchik 4–0, Chernomorets Balchik–Litex Lovech 1–0.)	
11	Chernomorets Balchik	30	10	9	11	37	40	−3	39	
12	Strumska Slava Radomir	30	10	6	14	31	43	−12	36	
13	Oborishte (R)	30	9	6	15	26	32	−6	33 (Note: Oborishte is ahead of Maritsa Plovdiv on head-to-head goal difference: Oborishte–Maritsa Plovdiv 1–2, Maritsa Plovdiv–Oborishte 0–3.)	Relegation to the Third League
14	Maritsa Plovdiv (R)	30	9	6	15	34	45	−11	33	Relegation to the Third League
15	Sozopol (R)	30	6	6	18	25	47	−22	24	Relegation to the Third League
16	Neftochimic (R)	30	2	3	25	15	62	−47	9	Relegation to the Third League

Source: bulgarian-football.com
Rules for classification: 1) Points; 2) Head-to-head points; 3) Head-to-head goal difference; 4) Head-to-head goals scored; 5) Head-to-head away goals scored (only if two teams); 6) Goal difference; 7) Goals scored; 8) Fairplay ranking; 9) Draw.
(C) Champions; (P) Promoted; (R) Relegated

== Results ==
Home \ Away	GAL	BVR	CBA	LIT	LGO	LSO	LUD	MAR	MON	NEF	NES	OBO	POM	SOZ	STR	TSS
Botev Galabovo		0–4	3–2	3–0	1–0	2–3	0–0	1–1	0–2	2–1	2–1	1–2	0–1	2–0	1–0	0–0
Botev Vratsa	0–0		3–2	1–0	0–0	2–2	5–0	2–1	2–1	4–0	1–1	1–0	1–0	0–1	1–0	1–0
Chernomorets Balchik	4–1	0–1		1–0	1–1	2–2	3–0	1–0	1–0	2–1	3–2	0–0	1–1	1–1	4–0	1–1
Litex	0–1	0–0	4–0		1–1	0–0	4–1	1–1	0–1	2–0	1–0	1–0	0–2	2–1	2–0	0–1
Lokomotiv Gorna Oryahovitsa	3–1	1–3	3–0	1–0		1–0	2–2	1–1	1–1	3–1	3–0	0–0	1–1	3–0	4–3	1–3
Lokomotiv Sofia	1–1	1–0	1–0	4–0	3–0		1–0	4–2	1–0	2–0	4–1	1–0	2–1	3–0	0–1	0–0
Ludogorets Razgrad II	2–1	4–1	2–2	1–1	2–2	2–1		0–2	1–0	2–0	0–2	3–0	2–1	1–0	1–2	3–2
Maritsa Plovdiv	1–2	1–1	0–1	0–1	3–1	1–3	3–3		1–0	1–0	0–0	0–3	1–0	1–0	0–1	1–3
Montana	3–1	0–1	4–0	2–1	1–0	4–0	4–0	2–1		4–0	1–3	2–0	2–1	2–1	1–1	1–0
Neftochimic	0–2	0–2	1–1	1–1	1–2	0–1	2–1	0–2	0–3		0–1	0–2	1–3	0–2	1–0	0–2
Nesebar	1–5	2–0	2–0	0–1	4–2	1–3	3–1	4–0	1–1	2–1		2–1	0–3	0–0	0–0	2–3
Oborishte	2–0	0–2	2–0	0–1	2–1	1–2	0–0	1–2	0–0	3–1	0–1		0–0	1–0	1–1	1–3
Pomorie	0–0	1–1	1–1	1–1	2–1	2–3	0–1	2–1	0–2	1–1	3–1	1–0		1–1	1–1	2–2
Sozopol	2–2	1–2	1–0	1–1	1–3	0–0	1–2	2–0	0–5	3–1	1–2	1–3	1–2		2–1	0–1
Strumska Slava Radomir	2–2	0–2	0–2	1–0	0–0	2–1	2–1	3–6	1–0	1–0	0–1	3–1	1–2	1–0		1–3
Tsarsko Selo	2–0	1–2	2–1	0–0	1–0	1–2	3–2	2–0	1–1	5–1	3–2	2–0	2–0	4–1	3–2	

Source: bulgarian-football.com
Legend: Blue = home team win; Yellow = draw; Red = away team win.

== Top scorers ==
As of match(es) played on 19 May 2018

Rank	Player	Club	Goals
1	(Bulgaria) Svetoslav Dikov	Tsarsko Selo	25
2	(Bulgaria) Iliya Dimitrov	Lokomotiv Sofia	17
3	(Bulgaria) Ivan Kolev	Botev Vratsa (Note: Including 8 goals for Nesebar.)	15
3	(Bulgaria) Vladislav Mirchev	Chernomorets Balchik	15
5	(Bulgaria) Pavel Petkov	Tsarsko Selo	11
5	(Bulgaria) Atanas Iliev	Montana	11
7	(Bulgaria) Nikolay Kostov	Nesebar	10
7	(Bulgaria) Petar Atanasov	Botev Vratsa (Note: Including 3 goals for Montana.)	10
9	(Bulgaria) Nikolay Tsvetkov	Lokomotiv Sofia	9
9	(Bulgaria) Ivan Kokonov	Montana	9
9	(Bulgaria) Ventsislav Gyuzelev	Maritsa Plovdiv	9
9	(Bulgaria) Deyan Hristov	Lokomotiv GO	9
9	(Bulgaria) Kristiyan Peshov	Sozopol	9
14	(Bulgaria) Spas Georgiev	Botev Vratsa	8
14	(Bulgaria) Iliyan Kapitanov	Oborishte (Note: Including 6 goals for Botev Galabovo.)	8
14	(Bulgaria) Ahmed Ahmedov	Pomorie	8
14	(Bulgaria) Denislav Aleksandrov	Ludogorets Razgrad II	8
14	(Bulgaria) Kristiyan Tasev	Strumska Slava	8
14	(Bulgaria) Zhivko Petkov	Pomorie	8
20	(Bulgaria) Ivaylo Stoyanov	Strumska Slava	7
20	(Bulgaria) Rangel Ignatov	Maritsa Plovdiv	7
20	(Bulgaria) Ivan Tsachev	Botev Galabovo	7
