= Svetoslav Dikov =

Bulgarian professional footballer

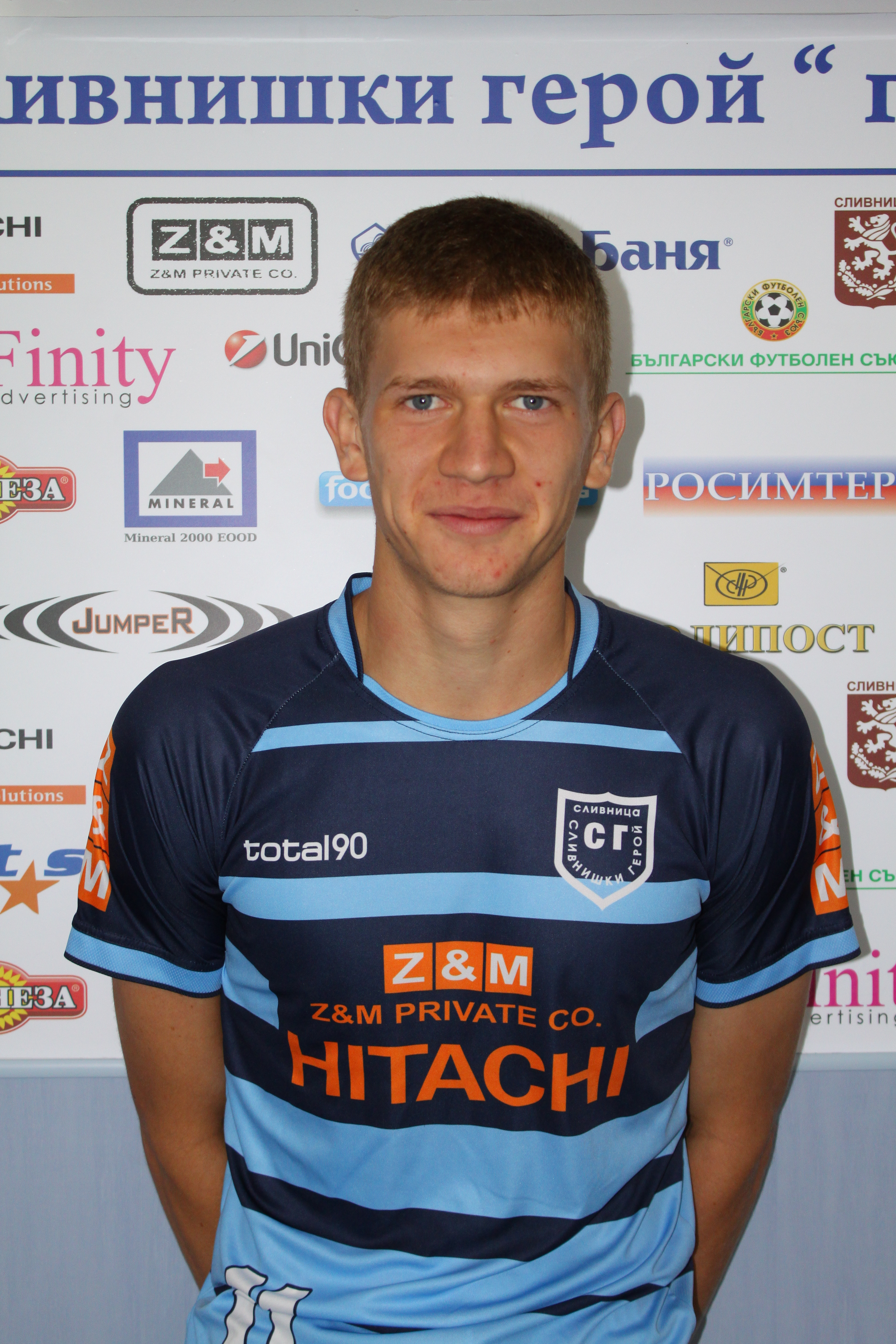
- Dikov with Slivnishki Geroy in 2012

Personal information
- Full name: Svetoslav Dimitrov Dikov
- Date of birth: 18 April 1992 (age 34)
- Place of birth: Sofia, Bulgaria
- Height: 1.97 m (6 ft 6 in)
- Positions: Midfielder; forward

Team information
- Current team: Minyor Pernik
- Number: 9

Youth career
- 1999–2008: CSKA Sofia
- 2008–2011: Lokomotiv Sofia
- 2011: Sliven 2000
- 2012: Akademik Sofia

Senior career*
Years	Team	Apps	(Gls)
2012–2013	Slivnishki Geroy	27	(1)
2013–2015	Marek Dupnitsa	27	(4)
2015–2016	Slivnishki Geroy	26	(12)
2016	Vereya	5	(0)
2017–2018	Tsarsko Selo	39	(33)
2018	CSKA 1948	13	(3)
2019	Tabor Sežana	6	(1)
2019	Tsarsko Selo	4	(0)
2019–2021	Lokomotiv Sofia	40	(32)
2021–2022	Sandecja Nowy Sącz	27	(1)
2022–2023	Sportist Svoge	11	(9)
2023	CSKA 1948 II	8	(3)
2023	CSKA 1948	13	(1)
2023–2024	Sportist Svoge	11	(4)
2024–2025	Lokomotiv Sofia	36	(4)
2025	Hebar Pazardzhik	10	(1)
2026	Marek Dupnitsa	5	(1)
2026–	Minyor Pernik	0	(0)
- * Club domestic league appearances and goals as of 8 July 2026

Svetoslav Dikov (Bulgarian: Светослав Диков; born 18 April 1992) is a Bulgarian professional footballer who plays as a forward for Minyor Pernik.

== Career ==
=== Early career ===
Dikov started his career from Slivnishki Geroy, before moving to Marek Dupnitsa and making his professional debut in A Group in 2014. In summer of 2015 he returned to Slivnishki Geroy.

=== Vereya ===
On 17 June 2016 Dikov signed with the newly promoted team to Bulgarian First League - Vereya. He made his debut for the team on 13 August 2016 in the local derby match against Beroe Stara Zagora, lost by 1:0.

On 27 October 2016 he scored the winning goal against Pomorie in match for the Bulgarian Cup, advancing his team to the quarterfinal.

=== Tsarsko Selo ===
In the beginning of 2017 Dikov left Vereya and started training with Botev Vratsa, but on 18 January 2017 he signed with another Bulgarian Second League team - Tsarsko Selo. He made his debut for the team on 25 February 2017 in a match against Vitosha Bistritsa and scored a goal for the 2:1 loss. On 14 April 2017 he scored two goals for the 3:0 win against Oborishte.

Dikov started the new 2017–18 season by scoring a hattrick in the first match against Nesebar. Later one of the goals was judged to have been an own goal. Dikov received a yellow card in the cup match against Botev Plovdiv from the bench as he entered the field to celebrate one of the goals. Later he scored a goal, but couldn't help his team to qualify for the next round. He also missed the next league match, the derby against Lokomotiv Sofia due to card accumulation. On 4 November he scored 2 goals against Neftochimic Burgas making him with 12 goals out of 12 played matches. Dikov become the top goalscorer in the 2017–18 season, scoring 25 goals in 27 matches.

=== CSKA 1948 ===
On 17 June 2018, Dikov signed with CSKA 1948. He made his debut for the team in the first league match against Botev Galabovo. On 4 August Dikov entered as a substitute in the match against Chernomorets Balchik and scored the winning goal in the extra time of the match.

=== Tabor Sežana ===
On 12 February 2019, NK Tabor Sežana announced the signing of Dikov from CSKA 1948.

=== CSKA 1948 ===
In January 2023, Dikov returned to CSKA 1948, but initially played for their second team. He eventually started making appearances for the top division side. On 10 April 2023, Dikov scored the fastest goal of the season, netting after 16 seconds in the 2:1 home win over Botev Plovdiv.

== Style of play ==
Dikov played mostly as a box-to-box midfielder, but in January 2017, after the injury of Simeon Ganchev, at the winter camp in Macedonia, Dikov was played as a forward in a friendly match where he scored a goal. Since then, Dikov was given the striker position at Tsarsko Selo.

== Personal ==
In 2020 Dikov became father of a son named Nikola. In 2023, Dikov also became father of a daughter named Kaya.

== Career statistics ==
=== Club ===
As of 25 May 2021

Club performance			League		Cup		Continental		Other		Total	
Club	League	Season	Apps	Goals	Apps	Goals	Apps	Goals	Apps	Goals	Apps	Goals
Bulgaria			League		Bulgarian Cup		Europe		Other (Note: Includes Bulgarian Supercup matches.)		Total	
Slivnishki Geroy	V Group	2012–13	27	1	0	0	–		–		27	1
Marek Dupnitsa	B Group	2013–14	22	4	2	0	–		–		24	4
Marek Dupnitsa	A Group	2014–15	5	0	0	0	–		–		5	0
Marek Dupnitsa	Total		27	4	2	0	0	0	0	0	29	4
Slivnishki Geroy	V Group	2015–16	26	12	0	0	–		–		26	12
Vereya	First League	2016–17	5	0	2	1	—		—		7	1
Tsarsko Selo	Second League	2016–17	12	8	0	0	–		–		12	8
Tsarsko Selo	Second League	2017–18	27	25	2	1	–		1	0	30	26
Tsarsko Selo	Total		39	33	2	1	0	0	1	0	42	34
CSKA 1948	Second League	2018–19	13	3	1	0	–		–		14	3
Tabor Sežana	2. SNL	2018–19	6	1	0	0	–		–		6	1
Tsarsko Selo	First League	2019–20	4	0	0	0	—		—		4	0
Lokomotiv Sofia	Second League	2019–20	12	9	0	0	–		–		12	9
Lokomotiv Sofia	Second League	2020–21	28	23	0	0	–		–		28	23
Lokomotiv Sofia	Total		40	32	0	0	0	0	0	0	40	32
Career statistics			187	86	7	2	0	0	1	0	195	89

== Honours ==
Marek Dupnitsa

- B Group: 2013–14

Individual

- Bulgarian Second League top scorer: 2017–18 (25 goals), 2020–21 (23 goals)
