= Dimo Krastev =

Bulgarian footballer (born 2003)

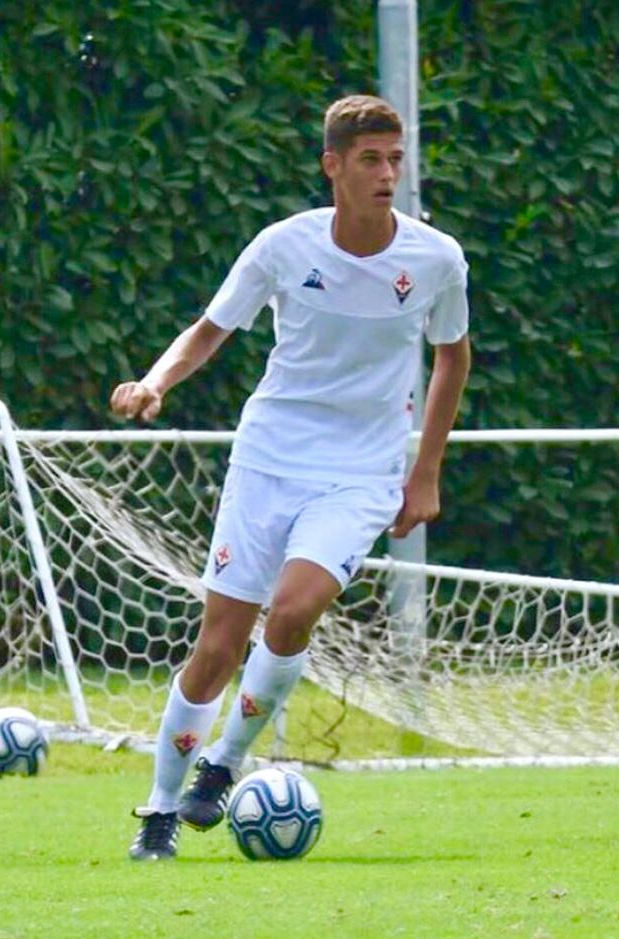

Personal information
- Full name: Dimo Nikolaev Krastev
- Date of birth: 10 February 2003 (age 23)
- Place of birth: Burgas, Bulgaria
- Height: 1.95 m (6 ft 5 in)
- Positions: Defender; midfielder

Team information
- Current team: Spartak Varna
- Number: 5

Youth career
- 2011–2014: Neftochimic 1986
- 2014–2018: Neftochimic Burgas
- 2019–2023: Fiorentina

Senior career*
Years	Team	Apps	(Gls)
2018–2019	Neftochimic Burgas	5	(0)
2021–2026	Fiorentina	0	(0)
2023–2024	→ Catanzaro (loan)	2	(0)
2024	→ Feralpisalò (loan)	3	(0)
2024–2025	→ Ternana (loan)	2	(0)
2025	→ Siracusa (loan)	0	(0)
2026–	Spartak Varna	17	(2)

International career^{‡}
2018–2019	Bulgaria U17	3	(1)
2020–2021	Bulgaria U19	3	(0)
2021–2022	Bulgaria U21	6	(0)
2022	Bulgaria	3	(0)
- * Club domestic league appearances and goals as of 07:55, 1 June 2026 (UTC) ‡ National team caps and goals as of 20:13, 10 September 2023 (UTC)

Dimo Nikolaev Krastev (Bulgarian: Димо Николаев Кръстев; born 10 February 2003) is a Bulgarian professional footballer who plays as a defender or midfielder for Spartak Varna.

== Career ==
Krastev was born in Burgas to the former football player of Neftochimic, coach and current director of the Junior Academy Nikolay Krastev. He made his professional debut for the team at the age of 15. On 8 March 2019, he joined Fiorentina's academy.

On 12 July 2023 he joined Catanzaro on loan. On 24 January 2024, Krastev moved on a new loan to Feralpisalò. On 30 August 2024, Krastev was loaned to Ternana in Serie C, with an option to buy.

On 28 August 2025, Krastev was loaned out to fellow Serie C club Siracusa.

== International career ==
Krastev has played for Bulgaria U15 and U17 teams, becoming the first captain of the latter. In 2021, he was announced as captain of Bulgaria U19.

On 18 May 2021, he received his first call-up for Bulgaria U21, for the friendly matches against Russia U21 and Albania U21 on 3 and 6 June.

On 16 November 2022, Krastev made his debut for the senior Bulgaria national team in a 2–0 win against Cyprus in a friendly match.

== Career statistics ==
=== Club ===
As of 30 January 2023.

Club	Season	League			Cup		Continental		Other		Total	
Club	Season	Division	Apps	Goals	Apps	Goals	Apps	Goals	Apps	Goals	Apps	Goals
Neftochimic Burgas	2017–18	Second League	1	0	0	0	–		–		1	0
Neftochimic Burgas	2018–19	Third League	4	0	0	0	–		–		4	0
Neftochimic Burgas	Total		5	0	0	0	0	0	0	0	5	0
Fiorentina	2020–21	Serie A	0	0	0	0	–		–		0	0
Fiorentina	2021–22	Serie A	0	0	0	0	–		–		0	0
Fiorentina	2022–23	Serie A	0	0	0	0	0	0	–		0	0
Fiorentina	Total		5	0	0	0	0	0	0	0	5	0
Career total			5	0	0	0	0	0	0	0	5	0

=== International ===
As of 10 September 2023

Appearances and goals by national team and year
National team	Year	Apps	Goals
Bulgaria	2022	1	0
Bulgaria	2023	2	0
Bulgaria	Total	3	0
