= 2019–20 Third Amateur Football League (Bulgaria) =

Third Amateur Football League
- Season: 2019–20
- Promoted: Dobrudzha Dobrich; Sozopol; Yantra Gabrovo; Minyor Pernik; Septemvri Simitli; Sportist Svoge
- Relegated: None (per decision of the Bulgarian Football Union); Kaliakra Kavarna (expelled)

The 2019–20 Third Amateur Football League season was the 70th season of the Bulgarian Third Amateur Football League. The group is equivalent to the third level of the Bulgarian football pyramid with four divisions existing in it. The divisions themselves are geographically separated into North-West, North-East, South-East, and South-West, covering the football clubs of their respective zones. This is the second season after the reorganization of the Bulgarian football system, which saw the emergence of new competition formats, such as First and Second Professional Football Leagues.

The matches were suspended on 13 March 2020 as a result of the coronavirus pandemic. On 21 April 2020, the Bulgarian Football Union decided that the league will not be completed and the standings prior to the suspension of the fixtures were considered final. The one exception was to constitute the South-West zone where initially a separate playoff was to be held between Minyor Pernik and Septemvri Simitli to determine the group winner, but on 15 May the Bulgarian Football Union decided to promote the team from Pernik directly. No teams were relegated from the Third Amateur Football League, with the exception of teams that were expelled from the league for financial problems.

== Team changes ==
=== To Third League ===
Promoted from Regional Divisions

- Chernolomets Popovo
- Shumen
- Drenovets
- Juventus Malchika
- Yambol
- Rodopa Smolyan
- Kyustendil
- Perun

Relegated from Second League

- Nesebar
- Dobrudzha Dobrich

=== Club movements between Third League and Second League ===
The champions of three Third League divisions gained promotion to the 2020–21 Second League: Dobrudzha Dobrich from North-East, Yantra Dabrova from North-West, Minyor Pernik from South-West, Sozopol from South-East group.

=== Club movements between Third League and the Regional Groups ===
- North-East: Volov Shumen was relegated last season to regional divisions.
- North-West: Yantra Polski Trambesh and Levski were relegated to regional amateur football groups.
- South-East: Sadovo and Asenovets Asenovgrad were relegated to regional amateur football groups.
- South-West: Sapareva Banya and Kyustendil were relegated to regional amateur football groups.

== Northeast group ==
=== Stadia and locations ===
Location of teams in 2019–20 North-East Third League

North-East Third League
- Season: 2019–20
- Champions: Dobrudzha Dobrich
- Promoted: Dobrudzha Dobrich
- Relegated: None
- Matches: 93
- Goals: 303 (3.26 per match)
- All statistics correct as of 4 March 2020.

Team	City	Stadium	Capacity
Benkovski	Byala	Georgi Benkosvki	3,000
Botev	Novi Pazar	Gradski	8,000
Chernolomets Popovo	Popovo	Stamo Kostov Stadium(Popovo)	5,000
Dobrudzha	Dobrich	Druzhba	12,500
Hitrino	Hitrino	Hitrino	600
Kaliakra	Kavarna	Kavarna	5,000
Kubrat	Kubrat	Gradski	6,000
Lokomotiv	Ruse	Dunav	19,960
Septemvri	Tervel	Septemvri	700
Shumen	Shumen	Panayot Volov Stadium	24,390
Suvorovo	Suvorovo	Suvorovo	1,000
Svetkavitsa	Targovishte	Dimitar Burkov	5,000
Topoli	Topoli	Topoli Stadium	1,000
Ustrem	Donchevo	Donchevo Stadium	1,000

=== League table ===
Pos	Team	Pld	W	D	L	GF	GA	GD	Pts	Promotion or relegation
1	Dobrudzha Dobrich (C, P)	15	15	0	0	51	7	+44	45	Promotion to Second League
2	Suvorovo	16	10	2	4	41	15	+26	32	
3	Ustrem	15	10	1	4	28	21	+7	31	
4	Chernolomets Popovo	14	8	3	3	31	14	+17	27	
5	Septemvri Tervel	16	8	4	4	26	12	+14	28	
6	Svetkavitsa Targovishte	16	8	3	5	32	29	+3	27	
7	Topoli	15	7	2	6	21	19	+2	23	
8	Shumen	14	5	4	5	27	22	+5	19	
9	Kubrat	14	3	1	10	9	33	−24	10	
10	Benkovski Byala	15	2	2	11	14	41	−27	8	
11	Botev Novi Pazar	14	0	2	12	6	42	−36	2	
12	Hitrino	23	4	2	17	17	51	−34	14	
13	Kaliakra Kavarna (D)	0	0	0	0	0	0	0	0	Expelled from the league
14	Lokomotiv Ruse (D)	0	0	0	0	0	0	0	0	Expelled from the league

Source: bulgarian-football.com, Soccerway
Rules for classification: 1) Points; 2) Head-to-head points; 3) Head-to-head goal difference; 4) Head-to-head goals scored; 5) Head-to-head away goals scored (only if two teams); 6) Goal difference; 7) Goals scored; 8) Fairplay ranking; 9) Draw.
(C) Champions; (D) Disqualified; (P) Promoted

== Southeast group ==
=== Stadia and locations ===
Location of teams in 2019–20 South-East Third League

South-East Third League
- Season: 2019–20
- Champions: Sozopol
- Promoted: Sozopol
- Relegated: None
- Matches: 178
- Goals: 498 (2.8 per match)
- Top goalscorer: (Bulgaria) Plamen Ivanov (14 goals)
- All statistics correct as of 4 March 2020.

Team	City	Stadium	Capacity
Atletik	Kuklen	Atletik	1,000
Borislav	Parvomay	Gradski	8,000
Chernomorets	Burgas	Chernomorets Stadium	22,000
Dimitrovgrad	Dimitrovgrad	Minyor	10,000
Gigant	Saedinenie	Saedinenie	5,000
Haskovo	Haskovo	Stadium Dimitar Kanev	20,000
Karnobat	Karnobat	Gradski	3,000
Levski	Karlovo	Vasil Levski	3,000
Maritsa Plovdiv	Plovdiv	Sporten Kompleks Botev 1912	4,000
Minyor	Radnevo	Minyor	2,000
Nesebar	Nesebar	Gradski	6,800
Rodopa	Smolyan	Septemvri Stadium	6,100
Rozova Dolina	Kazanlak	Sevtopolis	15,000
Sokol	Markovo	Sokol	2,500
Sozopol	Sozopol	Gradski	3,500
Svilengrad	Svilengrad	Kolodruma	1,750
FC Yambol	Yambol	Tundzha	18,000
Zagorets	Nova Zagora	Zagorets	5,900

=== League table ===
Pos	Team	Pld	W	D	L	GF	GA	GD	Pts	Promotion or relegation
1	Sozopol (C, P)	19	14	3	2	36	8	+28	45	Promotion to Second League
2	Zagorets	19	14	1	4	52	15	+37	43	
3	Maritsa Plovdiv	19	13	2	4	43	15	+28	41	
4	Chernomorets Burgas	19	11	3	5	30	19	+11	36	
5	Gigant Saedinenie	19	10	4	5	27	19	+8	34	
6	Minyor Radnevo	19	7	9	3	26	13	+13	30	
7	Rozova Dolina	19	9	3	7	38	30	+8	30	
8	Svilengrad	19	9	3	7	27	19	+8	30	
9	Nesebar	19	8	2	9	22	25	−3	26	
10	Borislav Parvomay	19	7	2	10	28	33	−5	23	
11	Levski Karlovo	19	5	6	8	18	22	−4	21	
12	Rodopa Smolyan	19	6	3	10	23	33	−10	21	
13	Atletik Kuklen	19	6	2	11	19	30	−11	20	
14	Yambol	19	4	4	11	17	38	−21	16	
15	Sokol Markovo	19	5	3	11	18	47	−29	18	
16	Karnobat	19	3	5	11	17	33	−16	14	
17	Dimitrovgrad	19	3	3	13	13	49	−36	12	
18	Haskovo (Note: On 21 January 2020, FC Haskovo 1957 (Haskovo) declined further participation. Their previous results were counted, and the opponents they were to face until the end of the championship were awarded official victories by a score of 3–0.) (D)	19	6	4	9	23	29	−6	22	Expelled from the league

Source: bulgarian-football.com, Soccerway
Rules for classification: 1) Points; 2) Head-to-head points; 3) Head-to-head goal difference; 4) Head-to-head goals scored; 5) Head-to-head away goals scored (only if two teams); 6) Goal difference; 7) Goals scored; 8) Fairplay ranking; 9) Draw.
(C) Champions; (D) Disqualified; (P) Promoted

== Northwest group ==
=== Stadia and locations ===
Location of teams in 2019–20 North-West Third League

North-West Third League
- Season: 2019-20
- Champions: Yantra Gabrovo
- Promoted: Yantra Gabrovo
- Relegated: None
- Matches: 91
- Goals: 313 (3.44 per match)
- All statistics correct as of 4 March 2020.

Team	City	Stadium	Capacity
Akademik	Svishtov	Akademik	13,500
Bdin	Vidin	Georgi Benkovski	15,000
Botev	Lukovit	Gradski	3,000
Kariana	Erden	Kariana Sport Complex	1,000
Levski	Levski	Levski	6,000
Miziya	Knezha	Gradski	1,000
Partizan	Cherven Bryag	Gradski	700
Parva Atomna	Kozloduy	Hristo Botev	3,000
Pavlikeni	Pavlikeni	Gancho Panov	10,000
Sevlievo	Sevlievo	Rakovski	5,000
Spartak	Pleven	Pleven	22,000
Tryavna	Tryavna	Gradski	3,000
Vihar	Slavyanovo	Gradski	1,000
Yantra 1919 Gabrovo	Gabrovo	Hristo Botev	14,000
Yantra Gabrovo	Gabrovo	Hristo Botev	14,000
Yantra Polski Trambesh	Polski Trambesh	Gradski	800

=== League table ===
Pos	Team	Pld	W	D	L	GF	GA	GD	Pts	Promotion or relegation
1	Yantra Gabrovo (C, P)	13	11	0	2	33	8	+25	33	Promotion to Second League
2	Sevlievo	13	9	2	2	33	13	+20	29	
3	Vihar Slavyanovo	13	8	4	1	28	15	+13	28	
4	Partizan Cherven Bryag	13	7	4	2	34	13	+21	25	
5	Pavlikeni	13	5	7	1	22	16	+6	22	
6	Drenovets	13	6	2	5	19	22	−3	20	
7	Lokomotiv Dryanovo	13	4	5	4	23	19	+4	17	
8	Akademik Svishtov	13	4	4	5	29	23	+6	16	
9	Lokomotiv Mezdra	13	4	3	6	15	20	−5	15	
10	Kom Berkovitsa	13	3	4	6	25	26	−1	13	
11	Parva Atomna	13	3	2	8	13	28	−15	11	
12	Tryavna	13	2	5	6	16	24	−8	11	
13	Bdin Vidin	13	2	1	10	9	37	−28	7	
14	Juventus Malchika	13	0	3	10	14	49	−35	3	

Source: bulgarian-football.com, Soccerway
Rules for classification: 1) Points; 2) Head-to-head points; 3) Head-to-head goal difference; 4) Head-to-head goals scored; 5) Head-to-head away goals scored (only if two teams); 6) Goal difference; 7) Goals scored; 8) Fairplay ranking; 9) Draw.
(C) Champions; (P) Promoted

== Southwest group ==
=== Stadia and locations ===
Location of teams in 2019–20 South-West Third League

South-West Third League
- Season: 2019–20
- Champions: Minyor Pernik
- Promoted: Minyor Pernik
- Relegated: None
- Matches: 152
- Goals: 397 (2.61 per match)
- All statistics correct as of 4 March 2020.

Team	City	Stadium	Capacity
Balkan	Botevgrad	Hristo Botev	8,000
Bansko	Bansko	Saint Peter	3,000
Belasitsa	Petrich	Kolarovo, Kolarovo	500
Botev	Ihtiman	Hristo Botev	5,000
Chavdar	Etropole	Chavdar	5,600
Nadezhda	Dovroslavtsi	Dobroslavtsi	
Perun Kresna	Kresna	Gradski	
Kyustendil	Kyustendil	Osogovo	10,000
Oborishte	Panagyurishte	Orcho Voyvoda	3,000
Marek	Dupnitsa	Bonchuk	8,050
Minyor	Pernik	Minyor	8,000
Pirin Razlog	Razlog	Gradski	6,500
Rilski Sportist	Samokov	Iskar	7,000
Septemvri	Simitli	Struma	8,000
Slivnishki Geroy	Slivnitsa	Slivnishki Geroy	7,000
Sportist Svoge	Svoge	Chavdar Tsvetkov	3,500
Vihren	Sandanski	Sandanski	6,000

=== League table ===
Pos	Team	Pld	W	D	L	GF	GA	GD	Pts	Promotion or relegation
1	Minyor Pernik (C, P)	18	13	3	2	34	6	+28	42	Promotion to Second League
2	Septemvri Simitli (Note: Septemvri Simitli was invited to compete in the Second League for the 2020-21 season, due to the disqualification of Botev Galabovo from the 2019-20 Second League.) (P)	17	12	5	0	31	11	+20	41	Promotion to Second League
3	Sportist Svoge (Note: Sportist Svoge was invited to compete in the Second League for the 2020-21 season, due to the disqualification of Pomorie from the 2019-20 Second League.) (P)	18	12	1	5	31	21	+10	37	Promotion to Second League
4	Vihren Sandanski	18	11	4	3	29	14	+15	37	
5	Oborishte	18	10	4	4	30	10	+20	34	
6	Velbazhd Kyustendil	18	10	2	6	27	17	+10	32	
7	Slivnishki Geroy	18	8	3	7	27	22	+5	27	
8	Bansko	17	8	2	7	26	18	+8	26	
9	Chavdar Etropole	18	6	5	7	30	27	+3	23	
10	Belasitsa Petrich	18	6	4	8	21	26	−5	22	
11	Botev Ihtiman	18	6	4	8	14	24	−10	22	
12	Nadezhda Dobroslavtsi	18	5	3	10	28	35	−7	18	
13	Pirin Razlog	18	4	5	9	12	22	−10	17	
14	Marek Dupnitsa	18	4	4	10	19	39	−20	16	
15	Balkan Botevgrad	18	4	3	11	16	33	−17	15	
16	Rilski Sportist	18	2	5	11	13	33	−20	11	
17	Perun Kresna	18	2	1	15	9	40	−31	7	

Source: bulgarian-football.com, Soccerway
Rules for classification: 1) Points; 2) Head-to-head points; 3) Head-to-head goal difference; 4) Head-to-head goals scored; 5) Head-to-head away goals scored (only if two teams); 6) Goal difference; 7) Goals scored; 8) Fairplay ranking; 9) Draw.
(C) Champions; (P) Promoted
