= Liu Ziming =

Chinese association football player

Personal information
- Date of birth: 26 June 1996 (age 30)
- Place of birth: Baoding, Hebei, China
- Height: 1.88 m (6 ft 2 in)
- Position: Forward

Team information
- Current team: Xiamen Feilu
- Number: 7

Youth career
- –2015: Shijiazhuang Ever Bright
- 2015: → Eulália Vizela (loan)

Senior career*
Years	Team	Apps	(Gls)
2015–2022	Cangzhou Mighty Lions	23	(0)
2015–2016	→ GDU Torcatense (loan)	0	(0)
2016	→ Pedras Salgadas (loan)	15	(4)
2017	→ Neftochimic (loan)	6	(0)
2021	→ Zibo Cuju (loan)	30	(5)
2022	→ Liaoning Shenyang Urban (loan)	25	(5)
2023	Liaoning Shenyang Urban	29	(10)
2024	Qingdao West Coast	0	(0)
2024	Liaoning Tieren	5	(0)
2025	Shijiazhuang Gongfu	18	(3)
2026–	Xiamen Feilu	0	(0)
- * Club domestic league appearances and goals as of 00:25, 10 March 2026 (UTC)

Liu Ziming (Chinese: 刘子铭; born 26 June 1996) is a Chinese footballer currently playing as a forward for China League Two club Xiamen Feilu.

== Club career ==
Liu Ziming would play for the Shijiazhuang Ever Bright youth team before being promoted to the senior team and then sent out on loan to third tier Portuguese clubs GDU Torcatense and Juventude de Pedras Salgadas. When he returned Liu he would make his debut for Shijiazhuang in a Chinese FA Cup game on 19 April 2017 against Yinchuan Helanshan that ended in a 1-0 victory. This was soon followed with another loan move to Bulgarian second tier club Neftochimic. After his return from Bulgaria, Liu was moved into the reserve team, where he quickly became the reserve league's top goalscorer. This saw Liu return to the senior team of Shijiazhuang and him making his league debut for the club on 20 October 2018 against Xinjiang Tianshan Leopard, which ended in a 3-1 victory. The following season he would become a regular within the team and aid the club to win promotion into the Chinese top tier when they came runners-up at the end of the 2019 league campaign.

Liu would only make a handful of games throughout the 2020 Chinese Super League campaign. On 12 April 2021 he would go out on loan to second tier club and go on to make his debut for them in a league game on 24 April 2021 against Zhejiang Professional F.C. in a 4-0 defeat. Despite the loss he would establish himself as a regular within the team and go on to score his first goal for the club in a league game on 22 September 2021 against Beijing Sport University F.C. in a 2-1 victory. On 28 April 2022, Liu would be loaned out again to another second tier club in Liaoning Shenyang Urban where he made his debut in a league game on 9 June 2022 against Shanghai Jiading Huilong F.C. in a 1-0 defeat. Once again he would establish himself as regular within the team and go on to score his first goal for the club in a league game on 26 June 2022 in the reverse fixture against Shanghai Jiading Huilong F.C. in a 3-1 victory.

== Career statistics ==
As of 31 December 2022.

Appearances and goals by club, season and competition
Club	Season	League			National Cup		Continental		Other		Total	
Club	Season	Division	Apps	Goals	Apps	Goals	Apps	Goals	Apps	Goals	Apps	Goals
Shijiazhuang Ever Bright	2015	Chinese Super League	0	0	0	0	–		–		0	0
Shijiazhuang Ever Bright	2017	China League One	0	0	1	0	–		–		1	0
Shijiazhuang Ever Bright	2018	China League One	1	0	0	0	–		–		1	0
Shijiazhuang Ever Bright	2019	China League One	19	0	1	0	–		–		20	0
Shijiazhuang Ever Bright	2020	Chinese Super League	3	0	1	0	–		–		4	0
Shijiazhuang Ever Bright	Total		23	0	3	0	0	0	0	0	26	0
GDU Torcatense (loan)	2015–16	Campeonato de Portugal	0	0	0	0	–		–		0	0
Pedras Salgadas (loan)	2015–16	Campeonato de Portugal	14	4	0	0	–		–		14	4
Pedras Salgadas (loan)	2016–17	Campeonato de Portugal	1	0	0	0	–		–		1	0
Pedras Salgadas (loan)	Total		15	4	0	0	0	0	0	0	15	4
Neftochimic (loan)	2017–18	Second League	6	0	1	0	–		–		7	0
Zibo Cuju (loan)	2021	China League One	30	5	0	0	–		–		7	0
Liaoning Shenyang Urban (loan)	2022	China League One	25	5	0	0	–		–		25	5
Career total			99	14	4	0	0	0	0	0	103	14
