= 2020–21 Second Professional Football League (Bulgaria) =

66th season of the Second Professional Football League (Bulgaria)

Second Professional Football League
- Season: 2020–21
- Champions: Pirin Blagoevgrad
- Promoted: Pirin Blagoevgrad; Lokomotiv Sofia
- Relegated: Vitosha Bistritsa (excluded); Kariana (excluded); Lokomotiv GO
- Top goalscorer: (Bulgaria) Svetoslav Dikov (23 goals)
- Biggest home win: Lokomotiv Sofia 6–0 Neftochimic
- Biggest away win: Neftochimic 0–6 Septemvri Sofia
- Highest scoring: Hebar Pazardzhik 5–2 Septemvri Sofia; Septemvri Sofia 2–5 Lokomotiv Sofia

The 2020–21 Second League was the 65th season of the Second League, the second tier of the Bulgarian football league system, and the 5th season under this name and current league structure. It was delayed by two weeks due to the COVID-19 situation in Bulgaria, which saw footballers from a number of the participating teams testing positive for COVID-19 in July 2020, with Minyor Pernik especially affected. The season began in August 2020.

The first game of the season was played on 7 August 2020, between Hebar and Pirin Blagoevgrad, ending in a draw.

On 28 September 2020, Vitosha Bistritsa was excluded from the league, after the club announced on the same day that they will withdraw from the competition due to financial problems. The club also announced that they will fold their senior team, only remaining active at youth level. Following Vitosha's expulsion from the league, the BFU announced that it would annul all of Vitosha's results from the start of the league until 28 September.

The season started with spectators being allowed (albeit at a reduced stadium capacity), but on 27 October 2020, following a worsening of the epidemiological situation in Bulgaria, Minister of Health Kostadin Angelov issued a decree valid from 29 October until 12 November, stipulating that all matches are to be held behind closed doors. On 12 November 2020, the ban regarding the presence of spectators was extended at least until 30 November. Fans were once again allowed from 24 April 2021 onwards, at 30% stadium capacity, with a maximum of 1000 people per stand.

On 7 December 2020, the match between Ludogorets II and Neftochimic was abandoned early in the first half with the score 2:0 in favour of the hosts after a Neftochimic player sustained an injury, reducing his side to 6 men. The guests had started the match with 7 players due to a wage-related boycott from the senior footballers and a ban on players under the age of 18 participating in sports events because of the coronavirus. Ludogorets II were eventually awarded a 5:0 win.

After the first half of the season ended in December, Kariana Erden announced that the team would withdraw from the league, for personal reasons related to its owners. Kariana's results would not be annulled, though, as per the BFU rules, teams that withdraw from the league during, or after the winter break will not have their results annulled.

On 23 April 2021, Pirin Blagoevgrad were promoted to the First League after a 2–0 away win against Litex Lovech.

== Teams ==
The following teams have changed division since the 2019–20 season.

=== To Second League ===
Promoted from Third League

- Dobrudzha Dobrich
- Sozopol
- Yantra Gabrovo
- Minyor Pernik
- Septemvri Simitli
- Sportist Svoge

Relegated from First League

- Vitosha Bistritsa
- Dunav Ruse

=== From Second League ===
Relegated to Third League

- Pomorie
- Spartak Pleven
- Spartak Varna
- Botev Galabovo
- Chernomorets Balchik

Promoted to First League

- CSKA 1948 Sofia
- Montana

Note: Dunav Ruse, who were relegated from the First League, failed to obtain a professional license from the Bulgarian Football Union with the team instead entering the Northeast group of the Third Football League. As a result, the Second League will consist of only 17 teams with no replacement team for Dunav's vacated spot.

== Stadia and locations ==
Location of teams in 2020–21 Second League

Team	City	Stadium	Capacity
Dobrudzha	Dobrich	Druzhba	12,500
Hebar	Pazardzhik	Georgi Benkovski	13,128
Kariana	Erden	Sport Complex Kariana	1,000
Litex	Lovech	Gradski, Lovech	8,100
Lokomotiv	Gorna Oryahovitsa	Lokomotiv, Gorna Oryahovitsa	10,500
Lokomotiv	Sofia	Lokomotiv, Sofia	22,000
Ludogorets II	Razgrad	Eagles' Nest	2,000
Minyor	Pernik	Minyor	8,000
Neftochimic	Burgas	efbet Arena	18,037
Pirin	Blagoevgrad	Hristo Botev	7,500
Septemvri	Simitli	Struma	8,000
Septemvri	Sofia	DIT	2,000
Sozopol	Sozopol	Arena Sozopol	3,500
Sportist	Svoge	Chavdar Tsvetkov	3,500
Strumska Slava	Radomir	Gradski, Radomir	3,500
Vitosha	Bistritsa	Bistritsa	2,000
Yantra	Gabrovo	Hristo Botev	14,000

== Personnel and sponsorship ==
Note: Flags indicate national team as has been defined under FIFA eligibility rules. Players and managers may hold more than one non-FIFA nationality.

Team	Manager	Captain	Kit manufacturer	Shirt sponsor	Kit sponsor
Dobrudzha	(Bulgaria) Svetoslav Petrov	(Bulgaria) Dimitar Iliev	Uhlsport	Corteva Agriscience	—
Hebar	(Bulgaria) Nikolay Mitov	(Bulgaria) Vasil Gerov	Jako	Efbet	Pazardzhik Municipality
Kariana	(Bulgaria) Veselin Velikov	(Bulgaria) Evgeni Ignatov	Joma	—	—
Litex	(Bulgaria) Zhivko Zhelev	(Bulgaria) Plamen Nikolov	Givova	WINBET	—
Lokomotiv Sofia	(Bulgaria) Ivan Kolev	(Bulgaria) Mario Petkov	Joma	Casa Boyana	Efbet, Malizia, Intesa, VIA 2000, Club 33
Lokomotiv GO	(Bulgaria) Milcho Sarmov	(Bulgaria) Petar Chalakov	KRASIKO	Efbet	Zaharni Zavodi, Prity, Enel, Go Grill
Ludogorets II	(Bulgaria) Todor Zhivondov	(Bulgaria) Tsvetoslav Petrov	Nike	Efbet	Vivacom, Spetema
Minyor	(Bulgaria) Hristo Yanev	(Bulgaria) Tomislav Pavlov	Jumper	Efbet	—
Neftochimic	(Bulgaria) Nikolay Krastev	(Bulgaria) Tsvetan Filipov	KRASIKO	Masterhaus	Burgas Municipality
Pirin Blagoevgrad	(Northern Ireland) Warren Feeney	(Bulgaria) Vladislav Zlatinov	Umbro	Emirates Wealth	—
Septemvri Simitli	(Bulgaria) Todor Kiselichkov	(Bulgaria) Anatoli Luleyski	Joma	Simitli Municipality	—
Septemvri Sofia	(Bulgaria) Hristo Arangelov	(Bulgaria) Georgi Sarmov	Uhlsport	WINBET	—
Sоzopol	(Bulgaria) Margarit Dimov	(Bulgaria) Petar Kyumurdzhiev	Erreà	—	Efbet
Sportist	(Bulgaria) Ivaylo Vasilev	(Bulgaria) Borislav Stoychev	Zeus	Petar Electric	—
Strumska Slava	(Bulgaria) Vladimir Dimitrov	(Bulgaria) Borislav Nikolov	Givova	Efbet	—
Vitosha Bistritsa	(Bulgaria) Asen Bukarev	(Bulgaria) Chetin Sadula	Jumper	Efbet	—
Yantra	(Bulgaria) Kostadin Angelov	(Bulgaria) Plamen Kozhuharov	Jumper	Efbet	—

Note: Individual clubs may wear jerseys with advertising. However, only one sponsorship is permitted per jersey for official tournaments organised by UEFA in addition to that of the kit manufacturer (exceptions are made for non-profit organisations). Clubs in the domestic league can have more than one sponsorship per jersey which can feature on the front of the shirt, incorporated with the main sponsor or in place of it; or on the back, either below the squad number or on the collar area. Shorts also have space available for advertisement.

=== Managerial changes ===
Team	Outgoing manager	Manner of departure	Date of vacancy	Position in table	Incoming manager	Date of appointment
Sportist	(Bulgaria) Georgi Stankov	Sacked	15 August 2020	17th	(Bulgaria) Ivaylo Vasilev	1 September 2020
Septemvri Simitli	(Bulgaria) Ivo Trenchev	Sacked	21 September 2020	9th	(Bulgaria) Todor Kiselichkov	21 September 2020
Minyor	(Bulgaria) Yuriy Vasev	Sacked	1 October 2020	9th	(Bulgaria) Hristo Yanev	1 October 2020
Neftochimik	(Bulgaria) Viktorio Pavlov	Sacked	2 October 2020	16th	(Bulgaria) Nikolay Krastev	3 October 2020
Yantra	(Bulgaria) Stoyan Atsarov	Sacked	7 October 2020	13th	(Bulgaria) Kostadin Angelov	7 October 2020

== League table ==
Pos	Team	Pld	W	D	L	GF	GA	GD	Pts	Promotion, qualification or relegation
1	Pirin Blagoevgrad (C, P)	30	20	5	5	66	26	+40	65	Promotion to the First League
2	Lokomotiv Sofia (P)	30	19	5	6	65	30	+35	62	Promotion to the First League
3	Septemvri Sofia (Q)	30	17	5	8	54	29	+25	56	Qualification for the promotion play-off
4	Ludogorets II	30	14	8	8	56	38	+18	50	Ineligible for promotion
5	Sportist Svoge	30	14	7	9	43	36	+7	49	
6	Hebar	30	13	9	8	50	36	+14	48	
7	Litex	30	9	12	9	36	31	+5	39	
8	Sozopol	30	10	9	11	35	40	−5	39	
9	Minyor Pernik	30	10	9	11	30	37	−7	39	
10	Strumska Slava	30	8	10	12	31	37	−6	34	
11	Yantra Gabrovo	30	10	4	16	30	47	−17	34	
12	Septemvri Simitli	30	9	6	15	34	42	−8	33	
13	Dobrudzha	30	7	9	14	28	46	−18	30	
14	Neftochimic	30	7	6	17	27	61	−34	27	
15	Lokomotiv GO (R)	30	5	10	15	24	43	−19	25	Relegation to the Third League
16	Kariana (R, D)	30	9	4	17	29	59	−30	31	Club dissolved (Note: Kariana were excluded from the league on 19 January 2021, due to the team voluntarily retiring their senior team in light of financial problems. All remaining fixtures involving Kariana will be awarded as a 3:0 victory for the opposing team.)
17	Vitosha Bistritsa (R, D)	0	0	0	0	0	0	0	0	Club dissolved (Note: Vitosha Bistritsa were excluded from the league on 28 September 2020, due to the team voluntarily retiring their senior team in light of financial problems. All remaining fixtures involving Vitosha were cancelled.)

Source: bulgarian-football.com
Rules for classification: 1) Points; 2) Head-to-head points; 3) Head-to-head goal difference; 4) Head-to-head goals scored; 5) Head-to-head away goals scored (only if two teams); 6) Goal difference; 7) Goals scored; 8) Fairplay ranking; 9) Draw.
(C) Champions; (D) Disqualified; (P) Promoted; (Q) Qualified for the phase indicated; (R) Relegated

== Results ==
Home \ Away	DOB	GAB	HEB	KAR	LGO	LIT	LSO	LUD	MIN	NEF	PIR	SEP	SIM	SOZ	SPO	STR	VIT
Dobrudzha	—	0–1	2–1	3–0	2–0	4–3	0–3	0–1	0–0	3–2	0–2	0–1	0–2	2–1	1–2	2–0	/
Yantra Gabrovo	2–1	—	1–0	1–0	1–3	0–3	1–1	2–2	3–2	4–0	0–2	0–2	0–1	2–0	0–1	0–1	/
Hebar	1–1	4–0	—	3–0	2–1	0–0	1–1	1–3	2–0	1–1	1–1	5–2	3–2	2–1	1–2	3–0	/
Kariana	2–2	0–3	1–1	—	4–0	0–3	3–2	2–1	0–3	0–3	1–2	0–3	3–0	0–3	0–3	2–1	/
Lokomotiv GO	1–1	0–1	0–0	3–0	—	0–0	0–0	0–2	1–2	1–1	1–2	0–2	3–0	1–0	0–0	0–0	/
Litex	0–0	1–0	3–1	1–2	1–0	—	1–1	2–2	5–1	1–0	0–2	2–3	1–1	3–2	1–1	1–1	/
Lokomotiv Sofia	4–1	1–3	1–3	3–0	2–0	2–0	—	3–1	0–0	6–0	3–1	1–0	2–0	4–1	3–0	3–2	/
Ludogorets II	2–2	3–0	3–2	3–0	2–0	0–1	1–4	—	2–1	2–0	3–2	2–0	4–1	1–1	1–1	4–1	/
Minyor Pernik	0–0	2–0	2–2	0–1	1–0	0–0	1–0	0–0	—	2–1	1–1	1–0	1–0	0–2	3–0	1–1	/
Neftochimic	0–0	1–1	2–1	0–4	1–3	0–0	0–1	3–1	0–1	—	2–1	0–6	2–1	0–1	2–4	1–0	/
Pirin Blagoevgrad	4–0	4–1	2–0	3–0	5–1	0–0	5–1	2–1	3–2	4–0	—	1–3	2–0	4–1	4–0	2–0	/
Septemvri Sofia	1–0	5–0	0–1	0–0	3–0	1–0	2–5	2–1	3–1	3–0	0–2	—	0–0	4–0	3–0	0–0	/
Septemvri Simitli	3–0	1–1	2–3	3–0	1–1	2–0	1–4	1–1	3–0	1–2	2–0	1–3	—	2–0	0–1	2–0	/
Sozopol	1–1	1–0	1–2	2–2	3–3	1–0	2–0	3–2	1–1	3–2	0–0	0–0	0–0	—	2–1	2–0	/
Sportist Svoge	2–0	1–0	1–1	1–2	3–0	1–0	0–2	1–2	5–1	1–1	1–1	5–1	3–1	1–0	—	0–0	/
Strumska Slava	4–0	4–2	0–2	3–0	1–1	3–3	0–2	0–0	1–0	1–0	1–2	1–1	2–0	0–0	3–1	—	/
Vitosha Bistritsa	/	/	/	/	/	/	/	/	/	/	/	/	/	/	/	/	—

Source: bulgarian-football.com
Legend: Blue = home team win; Yellow = draw; Red = away team win.
For upcoming matches, an "a" indicates there is an article about the rivalry between the two participants.

== Positions by round ==
Team ╲ Round	1	2	3	4	5	6	7	8	9	10	11	12	13	14	15	16	17	18	19	20	21	22	23	24	25	26	27	28	29	30	31	32	33	34
Pirin	7	3	10	3	8	6	5	4	5	4	3	3	2	1	2	1	2	2	1	1	2	1	1	1	2	1	1	1	1	1	1	1	1	1
Lokomotiv Sofia	1	1	1	1	1	1	1	2	2	2	2	2	3	3	3	4	1	1	2	2	1	2	2	2	1	2	2	2	2	2	2	2	2	2
Septemvri Sofia	8	4	8	11	12	9	8	7	6	5	4	4	6	6	6	7	7	6	5	6	6	6	7	6	6	6	6	6	5	4	3	3	3	
Ludogorets II	3	2	4	7	5	3	3	5	3	3	5	5	4	5	4	3	4	3	3	4	4	4	4	4	5	4	3	4	4	5	4	4	4	
Sportist	17	17	11	10	14	15	14	15	15	12	12	10	7	9	7	6	5	4	4	3	3	3	3	3	3	3	4	3	3	3	5	5	5	
Hebar	9	10	7	9	6	4	4	3	4	6	6	6	5	4	5	5	6	5	6	5	5	5	5	5	4	5	5	5	6	6	6	6	6	
Sozopol	11	13	12	15	15	14	15	16	12	13	13	12	14	13	12	10	10	9	8	8	7	7	6	7	7	8	8	9	8	7	7	7	7	
Minyor Pernik	14	8	5	2	3	7	6	9	9	10	10	11	12	14	13	13	13	12	12	11	11	11	11	11	10	7	7	7	7	8	8	8	8	
Litex	16	9	3	5	7	5	7	6	7	8	8	7	8	7	8	9	9	8	9	9	9	9	8	8	8	10	10	8	9	9	9	10	9	
Strumska Slava	12	15	17	12	13	11	13	10	10	9	9	9	10	8	10	12	12	11	11	12	12	12	12	12	12	12	12	12	12	11	10	9	10	
Yantra Gabrovo	4	6	6	8	9	10	10	11	14	14	15	15	15	16	16	15	15	14	14	14	14	14	14	14	14	14	14	14	13	13	13	11	11	
Septemvri Simitli	2	7	2	6	4	8	9	8	8	7	7	8	9	10	11	8	8	7	7	7	8	8	9	9	9	11	11	10	10	10	11	12	12	
Dobrudzha	5	11	16	14	11	13	12	13	11	11	11	13	11	11	9	11	11	10	10	10	10	10	10	10	11	9	9	11	11	12	12	13	13	
Neftochimic	6	12	13	16	16	16	16	17	16	16	16	16	16	15	15	16	16	15	15	15	15	15	15	15	15	15	15	15	15	15	15	15	14	
Lokomotiv GO	10	14	14	17	17	17	17	14	13	15	14	14	13	12	14	14	14	13	13	13	13	13	13	13	13	13	13	13	14	14	14	14	15	
Kariana	15	5	9	4	2	2	2	1	1	1	1	1	1	2	1	2	3	16	16	16	16	16	16	16	16	16	16	16	16	16	16	16	16	16
Vitosha	13	16	15	13	10	12	11	12	17	17	17	17	17	17	17	17	17	17	17	17	17	17	17	17	17	17	17	17	17	17	17	17	17	17

Updated to match(es) played on 16 May 2021. Source: bulgarian-football.com

== Transfers ==
- List of Bulgarian football transfers summer 2020
