= Borislav Borisov (footballer) =

Bulgarian footballer

Personal information
- Full name: Borislav Vladislavov Borisov
- Date of birth: 27 September 1990 (age 36)
- Place of birth: Bulgaria
- Height: 1.79 m (5 ft 10 in)
- Positions: Winger; forward

Senior career*
Years	Team	Apps	(Gls)
2009–2011	Bdin Vidin	57	(24)
2012	Litex	0	(0)
2012	→ Montana (loan)	10	(1)
2013	Lyubimets 2007	4	(0)
2013	Bdin Vidin	14	(8)
2014	Spartak Varna	13	(2)
2014	Burgas	14	(2)
2015	Chernomorets Burgas	11	(1)
2015–2016	Neftochimic	26	(7)
2016–2017	Sozopol	22	(2)
2017–2018	Botev Vratsa	25	(3)
- * Club domestic league appearances and goals as of 26 May 2018

Borislav Borisov (Bulgarian: Борислав Борисов; born 27 September 1990) is a Bulgarian footballer who plays as a forward.

== Career ==
Borisov started his career at Bdin Vidin. He scored 16 goals during 2010–11 season in the North-West V AFG and helped the team to B PFG promotion.

In early 2012, Borisov completed his move to Litex Lovech on a free transfer. On 2 February, he joined Montana on loan until the end of the season. Borisov made his A PFG debut on 3 March, in a 3–2 away win over Kaliakra Kavarna, coming off the bench to score Montana's third goal.

Borisov played for Sozopol for one season but was released in June 2017. In July 2017, he joined Botev Vratsa. He left the club at the end of the 2017–18 season.

== Club statistics ==
Club	Season	League		Cup		Continental		Total	
Club	Season	Apps	Goals	Apps	Goals	Apps	Goals	Apps	Goals
Bdin Vidin	2009–10	19	1	1	0	—		20	1
Bdin Vidin	2010–11	26	16	—		—		26	16
Bdin Vidin	2011–12	12	7	0	0	—		12	7
Bdin Vidin	Total	57	24	1	0	0	0	58	24
Montana	2011–12	10	1	0	0	—		10	1
Montana	Total	10	1	0	0	0	0	10	1

(Correct as of 1 June 2012)
