= 2019–20 Second Professional Football League (Bulgaria) =

Second Professional Football League
- Season: 2019–20
- Champions: CSKA 1948
- Promoted: CSKA 1948; Montana
- Relegated: Pomorie; Spartak Pleven; Spartak Varna; Vereya; Botev Galabovo; Chernomorets Balchik
- Matches: 176
- Goals: 475 (2.7 per match)
- Top goalscorer: (Bulgaria) Andon Gushterov (26 goals)
- Best goalkeeper: (Bulgaria) Ivaylo Vasilev (11 clean sheets)
- Longest winning run: 9 games by Septemvri Sofia
- Longest unbeaten run: 10 games by Septemvri Sofia
- Longest winless run: 13 games by Ludogorets Razgrad II
- Longest losing run: 9 games by Spartak Varna
- All statistics correct as of 9 March 2020.

The 2019–20 Second League was the 64th season of the Second League, the second tier of the Bulgarian football league system, and the 4th season under this name and current league structure. The season began in July 2019 and ended in May 2020, but without playing all the scheduled games. The two promotion/relegation playoffs (involving teams from the First League as well) were held in July 2020.

After the possibility of holding matches without spectators was initially envisioned, on 13 March 2020, the Bulgarian Football Union decided to suspend all fixtures until 13 April in accordance with the measures taken to combat the COVID-19 pandemic. On 3 April 2020, the state of national emergency was extended until 13 May 2020 and on 11 April the Minister of Youth and Sports Krasen Kralev confirmed that no mass participation sports events and full training sessions will be held until that date. On 15 May 2020, the Bulgarian Football Union announced that the league will not be completed, with the standings after 22 rounds to be considered final. Reportedly, 10 of the lower-ranked clubs expressed a preference for this scenario due to the financial and personnel difficulties experienced by them as a result of the crisis, though Septemvri Sofia and Lokomotiv Sofia were opposed. CSKA 1948 gained promotion to the First League while Septemvri Sofia and Montana faced the teams who finished in the 13th (Tsarsko Selo) and the 12th (Dunav Ruse) places respectively in the highest league in promotion/relegation playoffs, with the former losing the playoff and the latter promoted.

The season was marred by controversies, as several teams were disqualified from the Second League and admitted to lower divisions. Vereya was disqualified before the season started and relegated to the fourth division. During the season, Pomorie declined to further participate, resulting in demotion to the Third League for next season, due to financial problems. Similarly to Pomorie, Botev Galabovo and Chernomorets Balchik decided to withdraw from the league (during the period when the games were halted) due to financial issues.

In July 2020, after the season, three Lokomotiv GO players, twelve Minyor Pernik playing personnel, two Neftochimic footballers, four members of the Hebar squad and four Septemvri footballers as well as a trainer were reported to have tested positive for COVID-19.

== Teams ==
The following teams have changed division since the 2018–19 season.

=== To Second League ===
Promoted from Third League

- Spartak Varna
- Neftochimic Burgas
- Spartak Pleven
- Hebar Pazardzhik

Relegated from First League

- Septemvri Sofia

=== From Second League ===
Relegated to Third League

- Dobrudzha
- Nesebar

Promoted to First League

- Tsarsko Selo Sofia
- Arda Kardzhali

Note: FC Vereya, who were disqualified from the First League for match fixing, failed to obtain a professional license from the Bulgarian Football Union with the team instead entering the Southeast group of the Third Football League. As a result the Second League will consist of only 17 teams with no replacement team for Vereya's vacated spot.

== Stadia and locations ==
Location of teams in 2019–20 Second League

Team	City	Stadium	Capacity
Botev	Galabovo	Energetik	3,000
Chernomorets	Balchik	Gradski, Balchik	3,100
CSKA 1948	Sofia	Vasil Levski	43,230
Hebar	Pazardzhik	Georgi Benkovski	13,128
Kariana	Erden	Sport Complex Kariana	1,000
Litex	Lovech	Gradski, Lovech	8,100
Lokomotiv	Gorna Oryahovitsa	Lokomotiv, Gorna Oryahovitsa	10,500
Lokomotiv	Sofia	Lokomotiv, Sofia	22,000
Ludogorets II	Razgrad	Eagles' Nest	2,000
Montana	Montana	Ogosta	8,000
Neftochimic	Burgas	Arena Sozopol	3,500
Pirin	Blagoevgrad	Hristo Botev	7,500
Pomorie	Pomorie	Pomorie	2,000
Septemvri	Sofia	DIT	2,000
Spartak	Pleven	Pleven	22,000
Spartak	Varna	Spartak	8,000
Strumska Slava	Radomir	Gradski, Radomir	3,500

== Personnel and sponsorship ==
Note: Flags indicate national team as has been defined under FIFA eligibility rules. Players and managers may hold more than one non-FIFA nationality.

Team	Manager	Captain	Kit manufacturer	Shirt sponsor	Kit sponsor
Botev Galabovo	(Bulgaria) Mitko Kotsinov	(Bulgaria) Nikolay Yankov	KRASIKO	Jeep	Knauf, Galabovo Municipality
Chernomorets Balchik	(Bulgaria) Georgi Ivanov	(Bulgaria) Genadi Lugo	Uhlsport	Balchik Municipality	Efbet
CSKA 1948	(Bulgaria) Yordan Yurukov	(Bulgaria) Emil Mihaylov	Errea	Efbet	Bachkovo
Hebar	(Bulgaria) Nikolay Mitov	(Bulgaria) Vasil Gerov	Jako	Efbet	Pazardzhik Municipality
Kariana	(Bulgaria) Veselin Velikov	(Bulgaria) Evgeni Ignatov	Joma	—	—
Litex	(Bulgaria) Zhivko Zhelev	(Bulgaria) Plamen Nikolov	Givova	WINBET	—
Lokomotiv Sofia	(Serbia) Mladen Dodić	(Brazil) Tom	Joma	Casa Boyana	Efbet, Malizia, Intesa, VIA 2000, Club 33
Lokomotiv GO	(Bulgaria) Milcho Sarmov	(Bulgaria) Ivo Harizanov	KRASIKO	Efbet	Prity, Enel, Go Grill
Ludogorets II	(Bulgaria) Todor Zhivondov	(Bulgaria) Preslav Petrov	Nike	Efbet	Vivacom, Spetema
Montana	(Bulgaria) Vladimir Ivanov	(Bulgaria) Ivan Mihov	Jako	Efbet	—
Neftochimic	(Bulgaria) Diyan Petkov	(Bulgaria) Tsvetan Filipov	KRASIKO	Masterhaus	Burgas Municipality
Pirin Blagoevgrad	(Northern Ireland) Warren Feeney	(Bulgaria) Vladislav Zlatinov	Umbro	Emirates Wealth	—
Pomorie	(Bulgaria) Malin Orachev	(Bulgaria) Georgi Petkov	Jako	Efbet	—
Septemvri Sofia	(Bulgaria) Milen Radukanov	(Bulgaria) Boris Galchev	Uhlsport	WINBET	—
Spartak Pleven	(Bulgaria) Krasimir Bislimov	(Bulgaria) Ivaylo Radentsov	Hummel	Efbet	—
Spartak Varna	(Bulgaria) Nedelcho Matushev	(Bulgaria) Boyan Iliev	Jako	Efbet	—
Strumska Slava	(Bulgaria) Vladimir Dimitrov	(Bulgaria) Borislav Nikolov	Givova	Efbet	—

Note: Individual clubs may wear jerseys with advertising. However, only one sponsorship is permitted per jersey for official tournaments organised by UEFA in addition to that of the kit manufacturer (exceptions are made for non-profit organisations). Clubs in the domestic league can have more than one sponsorship per jersey which can feature on the front of the shirt, incorporated with the main sponsor or in place of it; or on the back, either below the squad number or on the collar area. Shorts also have space available for advertisement.

== Managerial changes ==
Team	Outgoing manager	Manner of departure	Date of vacancy	Position in table	Incoming manager	Date of appointment
Spartak Varna	(Bulgaria) Engibar Engibarov	End of contract	29 May 2019	Pre-season	(Bulgaria) Diyan Bozhilov	3 June 2019
Septemvri Sofia	(Bulgaria) Marian Hristov	Mutual consent	4 June 2019	Pre-season	(Bulgaria) Milen Radukanov	4 June 2019
Montana	(Bulgaria) Atanas Atanasov	End of contract	5 June 2019	Pre-season	(Bulgaria) Vladimir Ivanov	12 June 2019
Ludogorets II	(Bulgaria) Radoslav Komitov	Mutual consent	14 June 2019	Pre-season	(Bulgaria) Todor Zhivondov	14 June 2019
Pirin Blagoevgrad	(Bulgaria) Ivan Stoychev	Mutual consent	19 June 2019	Pre-season	(Bulgaria) Ivo Trenchev	20 June 2019
Botev Galabovo	(Serbia) Saša Simonović	Mutual consent	2 July 2019	Pre-season	(Bulgaria) Mitko Kotsinov	4 July 2019
Lokomotiv GO	(Bulgaria) Krasimir Mechev	Mutual consent	2 August 2019	14th	(Bulgaria) Milcho Sarmov	6 August 2019
Spartak Varna	(Bulgaria) Diyan Bozhilov	Mutual consent	3 August 2019	17th	(Bulgaria) Nedelcho Matushev	13 August 2019
CSKA 1948	(Bulgaria) Petko Petkov	Mutual consent	20 October 2019	2nd	(Bulgaria) Yordan Yurukov	21 October 2019

== League table ==
Pos	Team	Pld	W	D	L	GF	GA	GD	Pts	Promotion, qualification or relegation
1	CSKA 1948 (C, P)	21	18	1	2	59	18	+41	55	Promotion to the First League
2	Septemvri Sofia	20	17	1	2	47	19	+28	52	Qualification for the promotion play-offs
3	Montana (P)	21	13	3	5	40	17	+23	42	Qualification for the promotion play-offs
4	Lokomotiv Sofia	21	12	3	6	34	18	+16	39	
5	Neftochimic	21	10	3	8	35	29	+6	33 (Note: Neftochimic ahead of Hebar on head-to-head points: Neftochimic–Hebar 2–1.)	
6	Hebar	21	10	3	8	35	30	+5	33	
7	Litex	20	9	5	6	29	15	+14	32 (Note: Litex ahead of Kariana on head-to-head points: Kariana–Litex 1–1, Litex with more away goals.)	
8	Kariana	20	9	5	6	30	24	+6	32	
9	Lokomotiv GO	21	8	5	8	32	30	+2	29	
10	Botev Galabovo (R, D)	21	6	7	8	23	32	−9	25 (Note: Botev Galabovo ahead of Pirin Blagoevgrad on head-to-head points: Botev Galabovo–Pirin 0–0, Pirin–Botev Galabovo 2–2, Botev Galabovo with more away goals.)	Disqualified and relegated to the Third League (Note: Botev Galabovo was disqualified to the Third League, after the team voluntarily decided to cancel their participation in the Second League, due to financial difficulties.)
11	Pirin Blagoevgrad	20	6	7	7	24	29	−5	25	
12	Ludogorets II	21	5	9	7	20	25	−5	24	Ineligible for promotion
13	Strumska Slava	21	7	1	13	21	34	−13	22 (Note: Strumska Slava ahead of Chernomorets Balchik on head-to-head points: Strumska Slava–Chernomorets Balchik 1–0, Chernomorets Balchik–Strumska Slava 2–1, Strumska Slava with more away goals.)	
14	Chernomorets Balchik (R, D)	20	6	4	10	15	27	−12	22	Disqualified and relegated to the Third League (Note: Chernomorets Balchik was disqualified from the league, due to financial problems. The team was demoted to the Third League.)
15	Spartak Varna (R)	21	2	4	15	6	42	−36	10	Relegation to the Third League
16	Spartak Pleven (R)	21	2	4	15	10	41	−31	7 (Note: Spartak Pleven deducted 3 points for a first no-show without an excusable reason (round 8, against Montana).)	Relegation to the Third League
17	Pomorie (R, D)	21	2	3	16	15	45	−30	6 (Note: Pomorie deducted 3 points for a first no-show without an excusable reason (round 19, against Kariana).)	Disqualified and relegated to the Third League (Note: On 25 February 2020, Pomorie were disqualified and relegated from the league for not showing up to two consecutive matches. All results from played matches involving Pomorie were retained, and the team's opponents until the end of the season will be awarded 3–0 wins.)

Source: bulgarian-football.com
Rules for classification: 1) Points; 2) Head-to-head points; 3) Head-to-head goal difference; 4) Head-to-head goals scored; 5) Head-to-head away goals scored (only if two teams); 6) Goal difference; 7) Goals scored; 8) Fairplay ranking; 9) Draw.
(C) Champions; (D) Disqualified; (P) Promoted; (R) Relegated

== Results ==
Home \ Away	GAL	CBA	CSK	HEB	KAR	LIT	LGO	LSO	LUD	MON	NEF	PIR	POM	SEP	SPL	SVN	STR
Botev Galabovo	—	2–1	4–5	~~a~~	~~a~~	~~a~~	~~a~~	0–3	1–0	~~a~~	3–2	0–0	1–0	1–2	1–1	1–0	2–1
Chernomorets Balchik	~~b~~	—	~~b~~	1–1	1–0	~~b~~	2–0	0–0	1–0	~~b~~	~~b~~	0–2	0–1	0–1	~~b~~	4–0	2–1
CSKA 1948	~~c~~	2–0	—	~~c~~	~~c~~	~~c~~	~~c~~	2–0	2–2	2–0	4–0	2–0	5–1	5–0	7–1	2–0	2–0
Hebar	1–0	~~d~~	1–2	—	2–1	1–0	0–0	~~d~~	~~d~~	1–3	~~d~~	1–3	3–0	~~d~~	3–0	3–0	~~d~~
Kariana	0–0	~~e~~	3–2	~~e~~	—	1–1	1–0	~~e~~	~~e~~	1–1	4–1	2–2	3–0	~~e~~	2–3	~~e~~	1–0
Litex	3–0	4–0	1–0	~~f~~	~~f~~	—	5–0	~~f~~	~~f~~	0–1	1–1	1–2	~~f~~	1–0	0–0	~~f~~	0–2
Lokomotiv GO	3–2	1–1	2–3	6–1	1–2	0–0	—	~~g~~	~~g~~	2–1	1–0	~~g~~	~~g~~	0–1	3–0	~~g~~	3–2
Lokomotiv Sofia	2–0	~~h~~	2–3	3–3	2–0	1–0	3–0	—	2–0	0–1	~~h~~	2–0	~~h~~	~~h~~	1–0	~~h~~	~~h~~
Ludogorets II	2–2	~~i~~	~~i~~	0–3	1–1	0–1	2–2	2–1	—	0–0	~~i~~	1–1	~~i~~	~~i~~	2–0	1–0	~~i~~
Montana	3–0	6–1	0–1	2–1	3–1	~~j~~	~~j~~	~~j~~	2–0	—	4–2	~~j~~	5–1	0–2	3–0	~~j~~	2–0
Neftochimic	~~k~~	1–0	~~k~~	2–1	~~k~~	~~k~~	2–0	3–3	0–0	0–2	—	1–0	2–1	0–2	~~k~~	5–0	3–0
Pirin Blagoevgrad	2–2	~~l~~	~~l~~	~~l~~	~~l~~	0–0	0–5	0–1	~~l~~	1–1	~~l~~	—	3–1	1–4	2–0	2–2	3–1
Pomorie	~~m~~	0–0	0–3	0–1	0–1	2–3	2–3	1–3	0–0	~~m~~	0–3	~~m~~	—	~~m~~	~~m~~	2–0	~~m~~
Septemvri Sofia	~~n~~	4–0	~~n~~	4–2	3–2	4–3	~~n~~	2–1	2–2	~~n~~	~~n~~	2–0	3–1	—	~~n~~	3–0	2–0
Spartak Pleven	0–0	0–1	1–4	1–3	~~o~~	~~o~~	~~o~~	0–2	0–1	~~o~~	1–2	~~o~~	2–1	0–2	—	0–0	0–1
Spartak Varna	1–1	~~o~~	0–1	0–2	1–2	0–4	0–0	1–0	0–2	1–0	0–4	~~o~~	~~o~~	~~o~~	~~o~~	—	~~o~~
Strumska Slava	~~p~~	1–0	~~p~~	2–1	0–2	0–1	~~p~~	0–2	4–2	~~p~~	2–1	~~p~~	1–1	0–4	~~p~~	3–0	—

Source: bulgarian-football.com
Legend: Blue = home team win; Yellow = draw; Red = away team win.
For upcoming matches, an "a" indicates there is an article about the rivalry between the two participants.

=== Positions by round ===
Team ╲ Round	1	2	3	4	5	6	7	8	9	10	11	12	13	14	15	16	17	18	19	20	21	22
CSKA 1948	5	2	1	1	1	1	1	1	1	1	1	2	2	2	2	2	2	2	1	1	1	1
Septemvri	4	7	6	3	2	2	2	2	2	2	2	1	1	1	1	1	1	1	2	2	2	2
Montana	9	4	2	6	7	4	3	3	4	4	3	3	3	4	6	4	3	3	3	3	3	3
Lokomotiv Sofia	12	8	8	5	3	3	4	4	3	3	4	4	4	3	3	3	4	4	5	4	4	4
Neftochimic	2	6	5	9	6	8	10	8	5	8	7	6	7	7	7	9	7	6	7	5	5	5
Hebar	3	3	7	4	4	5	7	9	6	6	5	8	10	10	8	7	8	7	4	6	6	6
Litex	1	1	4	8	9	7	9	7	10	7	6	5	5	6	5	6	5	5	6	8	8	7
Kariana	10	5	3	2	5	6	5	6	8	5	8	7	9	9	10	10	10	10	8	7	7	8
Lokomotiv GO	15	14	14	11	11	12	12	11	12	10	10	10	6	5	4	5	6	8	9	9	9	9
Botev Galabovo	7	10	12	13	10	11	11	12	9	11	11	11	11	11	11	11	11	11	11	11	10	10
Pirin	17	11	13	14	13	10	6	5	7	9	9	9	8	8	9	8	9	9	10	10	11	11
Ludogorets II	8	13	9	7	8	9	8	10	11	12	12	14	14	14	14	13	13	13	13	13	12	12
Strumska Slava	13	15	15	16	16	15	16	14	15	16	13	12	12	12	13	14	14	14	14	14	14	13
Chernomorets	11	12	10	10	12	14	15	13	14	13	15	13	13	13	12	12	12	12	12	12	13	14
Spartak Varna	16	17	17	17	17	16	14	15	13	14	14	15	15	15	15	15	15	16	16	16	15	15
Spartak Pleven	14	16	16	15	15	17	17	17	17	17	17	17	17	17	17	17	17	17	17	17	16	16
Pomorie	6	9	11	12	14	13	13	16	16	15	16	16	16	16	16	16	16	15	15	15	17	17

Updated to match(es) played on 16 May 2020. Source: bulgarian-football.com

=== Results by round ===
Team ╲ Round	1	2	3	4	5	6	7	8	9	10	11	12	13	14	15	16	17	18	19	20	21	22
Botev Galabovo	D	D	L	D	W	L	W	L	W	–	L	L	W	D	W	L	L	W	D	L	D	D
Chernomorets	L	D	W	–	L	L	L	W	L	D	L	W	L	D	W	W	L	D	W	L	–	L
CSKA 1948	W	W	W	W	W	W	W	–	W	L	W	L	W	W	W	D	W	W	W	W	W	W
Hebar	W	W	L	W	D	L	–	L	W	D	W	L	L	L	W	W	D	W	W	L	W	L
Kariana	D	W	W	W	–	L	D	L	D	W	L	W	D	D	L	L	W	L	W	W	W	–
Litex	W	W	–	L	L	W	D	D	L	W	W	W	L	D	W	L	W	D	L	–	W	D
Lokomotiv GO	L	D	L	W	D	L	D	W	L	W	D	W	W	W	W	–	L	D	L	L	L	W
Lokomotiv Sofia	L	W	W	W	W	L	L	W	W	W	–	L	W	D	W	D	D	L	L	W	W	W
Ludogorets II	D	L	W	W	D	D	D	L	–	D	L	L	D	D	L	D	D	L	W	W	W	L
Montana	D	W	W	L	D	W	W	W	L	D	W	L	W	–	L	W	W	W	W	W	L	W
Neftochimic	W	L	W	L	W	–	L	D	W	L	W	W	L	D	L	D	W	W	L	W	W	L
Pirin	–	D	L	L	W	W	W	D	D	D	L	W	W	L	L	W	D	–	D	L	L	D
Pomorie	W	L	L	L	L	D	L	L	L	W	L	L	L	D	–	L	L	D	L	L	L	L
Septemvri	W	–	W	W	W	W	W	W	L	D	W	W	W	W	W	W	W	W	–	W	L	W
Spartak Pleven	L	L	L	D	L	L	D	L	W	L	L	–	L	D	L	W	L	L	L	L	D	L
Spartak Varna	L	L	L	L	L	W	D	D	W	L	D	L	–	L	L	L	L	L	L	L	L	D
Strumska Slava	L	L	L	L	L	W	L	W	L	L	W	W	L	D	L	L	–	L	W	W	L	W

Updated to match(es) played on 9 March 2020. Source: bulgarian-football.com
W = Win; D = Draw; L = Loss

== Transfers ==
- List of Bulgarian football transfers summer 2019
