= Zhechev =

Zhechev (Bulgarian: Жечев), female form Zhecheva (Bulgarian: Жечева), is a Bulgarian surname. Notable people with this surname include:

- Dobromir Zhechev (1942–2025), Bulgarian football player and manager
- Lyudmila Andonova-Zhecheva (born 1960), Bulgarian high jumper
- Nikolay Zhechev (born 1974), Bulgarian football player
