= Nikolay Rusev =

Bulgarian footballer (born 1956)

Personal information
- Full name: Nikolay Ivanov Rusev
- Date of birth: 26 August 1956 (age 70)
- Place of birth: Nesebar, Bulgaria
- Height: 1.77 m (5 ft 10 in)
- Position: Midfielder

Team information
- Current team: Nesebar

Youth career
- 1966–1972: Nesebar

Senior career*
Years	Team	Apps	(Gls)
1972–1983	Nesebar	195	(39)
1983–1987	Chernomorets Burgas	119	(37)
1987–1989	APEP		
1989–1990	Anagennisi Dherynia		
1990–1995	Nesebar		

Managerial career
- 2000–2001: Chernomorets Burgas
- 2001–2008: Nesebar
- 2008–2010: Nesebar (youth coach)
- 2010–2017: Nesebar
- 2017–: Nesebar (youth academy director)
- 2021–: Nesebar
- * Club domestic league appearances and goals

Nikolay Ivanov Rusev -"The Jangur"(Bulgarian: Николай Иванов Русев, born 26 August 1956) is a Bulgarian former football midfielder who works as Head of Youth Academy of Nesebar. He is most famous for having played for Nesebar and Chernomorets Burgas.

== PLaying career ==
Rusev was born in Nesebar and started to play football at his hometown club Nesebar. He was promoted into the first team in 1972. He was transferred to Chernomorets Burgas in the 1981–82 season and scored 25 goals for the club. In 1983, Rusev moved to Anagennisi Dherynia. In his career he also played for APEP. He finished his career at his first club PFC Nesebar in 1995.

== Coaching career ==
After retiring in 1995, Rusev pursued a career as a coach. In July 2001, he was appointed as a manager in his hometown club Nesebar. In 2008, he became a youth coach at the club. He had been appointed on 29 May 2010 again as a manager of PFC Nesebar to replace Georgi Vasilev who left after loss the play-off against Akademik Sofia with a result of 1:2 for promotion to the A PFG. On 18 June 2017, Rusev was replaced by Nikolay Zhechev and moved to a new role, Youth Academy director.
