= Dimcho Nenov =

Bulgarian footballer and manager

Personal information
- Date of birth: 19 May 1967 (age 59)
- Place of birth: Burgas, PR Bulgaria

Team information
- Current team: Neftochimic Burgas (manager)

Managerial career
- Years: Team
- 2004–2008: Naftex Burgas (youth coach)
- 2011–2012: Sliven 2000
- 2012–2013: Neftochimic Burgas
- 2013–2014: Haskovo
- 2015: Dobrudzha Dobrich
- 2015–2016: Neftochimic Burgas

Dimcho Nenov (Bulgarian: Димчо Ненов; born 19 May 1967) is a Bulgarian football manager and former footballer. He was managing Neftochimic Burgas. However, due to poor results, he was sacked from managing the club. He is currently employed as an assistant manager of Lokomotiv GO.
