= Nikolay Kostov (footballer, born 1986) =

Bulgarian footballer

Personal information
- Full name: Nikolay Nikolaev Kostov
- Date of birth: 9 September 1986 (age 40)
- Place of birth: Bulgaria
- Height: 1.82 m (5 ft 11 1/2 in)
- Position: Right-back

Team information
- Current team: Neftochimic
- Number: 27

Senior career*
Years	Team	Apps	(Gls)
2004–2006	Naftex Burgas	33	(0)
2006–2007	Chernomorets Burgas		
2007–2010	Nesebar	58	(2)
2010	Chernomorets Balchik	13	(0)
2011	Nesebar	10	(0)
2011–2012	Neftochimic 1986	18	(1)
2012–2013	Nesebar	39	(7)
2014	Neftochimic 1986	16	(1)
2014	Vereya	10	(1)
2015–2018	Nesebar	101	(25)
2019–	Neftochimic	27	(4)
- * Club domestic league appearances and goals as of 15 December 2019

Nikolay Kostov (Bulgarian: Николай Костов; born 9 September 1986) is a Bulgarian footballer, who currently plays for Neftochimic Burgas as a defender.
