= Nikolay Krastev (footballer, born 1979) =

Bulgarian footballer

Personal information
- Full name: Nikolay Dimov Krastev
- Date of birth: 29 October 1979 (age 46)
- Place of birth: Burgas, Bulgaria
- Height: 1.85 m (6 ft 1 in)
- Position: Defender

Team information
- Current team: Neftochimic (assistant)

Senior career*
Years	Team	Apps	(Gls)
1997–2006	Naftex Burgas	143	(7)
2006–2011	Chernomorets Burgas	94	(14)
2011–2012	Chernomorets Pomorie	14	(0)
Total		251	(21)

International career
2003–2004	Bulgaria	6	(0)

Managerial career
- 2012: Chernomorets Pomorie (assistant)
- 2012–2015: Chernomorets Burgas (youth coach)
- 2014–2015: Chernomorets Burgas (assistant)
- 2015: Pirin Blagoevgrad (assistant)
- 2015–2017: Chernomorets 1919 (youth coach)
- 2017: Neftochimic (head of academy)
- 2017: Neftochimic
- 2017–2020: Neftochimic (assistant)
- 2020: Neftochimic
- * Club domestic league appearances and goals

Nikolay Krastev (Bulgarian: Николай Кръстев) (born 29 October 1979) is a former Bulgarian footballer, who played as a defender and is currently manager of Neftochimic Burgas. Krastev was a central/left defender and captain of the team. He started his career in Naftex Burgas's youth teams.

== Career ==
Krastev played nine seasons for Naftex Burgas. In 2003 and 2004, he was a part of Bulgaria national football team, being capped six times. He signed with Chernomorets Burgas in June 2006 on a free transfer and played in Intertoto Cup 2008 matches against the Slovenian ND Gorica and the Swiss Grasshopper Club Zürich. In January 2011, he signed with Chernomorets Pomorie.

On 23 June 2017, Krastev was appointed as manager of Neftochimic Burgas. On 6 October 2017, following a Board of Directors' decision, Krastev was demoted to assistant manager with Blagomir Mitrev taking charge of the club. He once again became head coach in October 2020, after Viktorio Pavlov was relieved of his duties as manager.

== Personal life ==
Krastev's son, Dimo Krastev, is also a professional footballer.
