= Stanislav Zhekov =

Bulgarian footballer

Personal information
- Full name: Stanislav Zhelev Zhekov
- Date of birth: 6 February 1980 (age 46)
- Place of birth: Burgas, PR Bulgaria
- Height: 1.89 m (6 ft 2 in)
- Position: Centre back

Team information
- Current team: Neftochimic (manager)

Senior career*
Years	Team	Apps	(Gls)
2000–2002	Naftex	8	(0)
2002–2003	Spartak Varna	21	(1)
2003–2007	Naftex	55	(0)
2007–2008	Spartak Varna	20	(1)
2008–2009	Chernomorets Burgas	1	(0)
2009	Spartak Varna	24	(1)
2010	Montana	27	(0)
2011	Ludogorets	11	(1)
2011–2012	Pelita Jaya	29	(2)
2012–2013	Perseman Manokwari	26	(2)
2013	Master Burgas	15	(2)
2014	Neftochimic 1986	15	(1)
2014	Nesebar	13	(0)
2015	PFC Burgas	11	(1)
2015–2016	Neftochimic	25	(3)
2016–2017	Pomorie	18	(0)
2017–2019	Neftochimic	43	(1)
2019–2020	Nesebar	32	(1)

International career
- Bulgaria U21

Managerial career
- 2017–2019: Neftochimic (assistant)
- 2019–2020: Nesebar (assistant)
- 2019–2020: Nesebar U19
- 2021–2022: Neftochimic (academy)
- 2022–: Neftochimic
- * Club domestic league appearances and goals as of 24 May 2019

Stanislav Zhekov (Bulgarian: Станислав Жеков; born 6 February 1980) is a Bulgarian footballer who played as a defender. He is now manager of Neftochimic. In season 2019-2020 he is Head coach of Nesebar U19 team and they became champions in their championship.

== Career ==
Zhekov previously played for Neftochimic Burgas, Spartak Varna, Chernomorets Burgas and Pomorie.

In June 2017, Zhekov returned to his hometown club Neftochimic as player and assistant manager.
