= Lyudmil Kirov =

Bulgarian footballer and manager

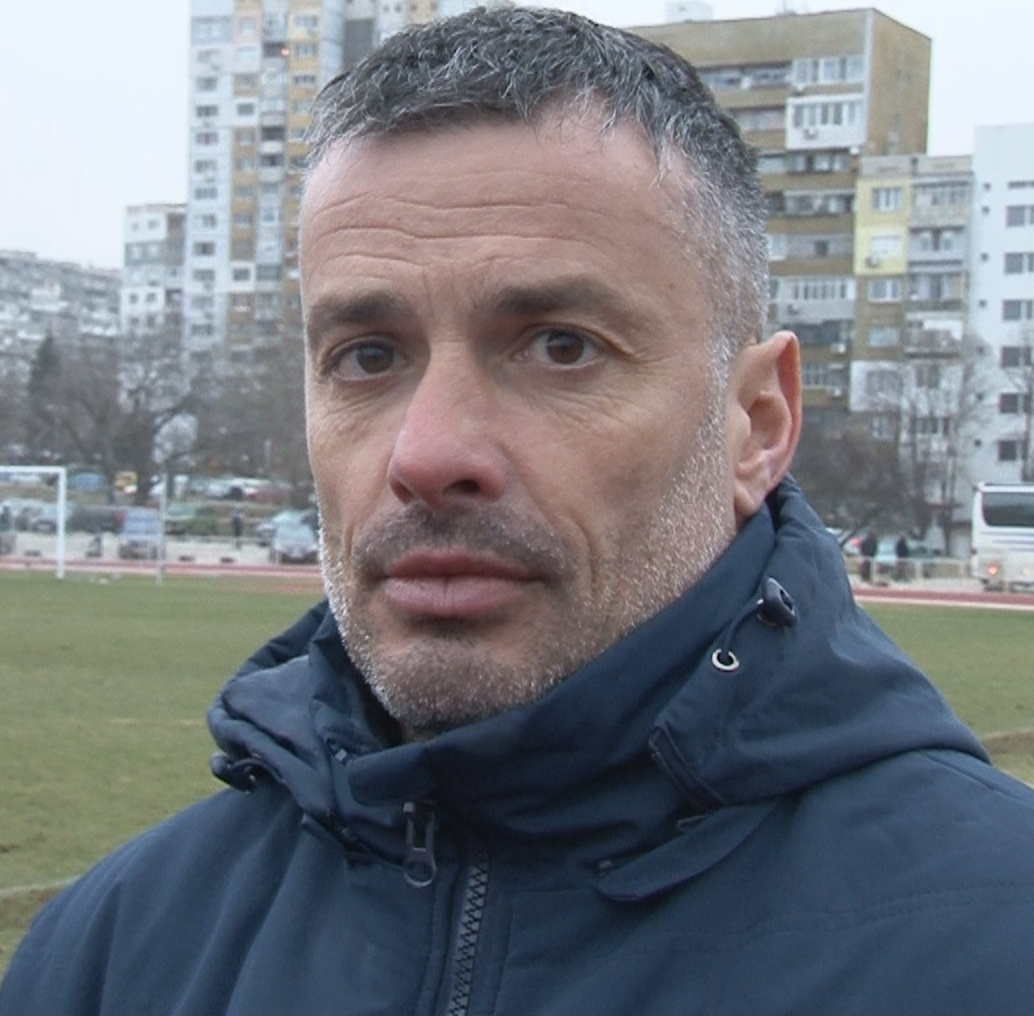

Personal information
- Full name: Lyudmil Ivanov Kirov
- Date of birth: 15 February 1976 (age 50)
- Place of birth: Ruse, Bulgaria
- Height: 1.78 m (5 ft 10 in)
- Position: Midfielder

Senior career*
Years	Team	Apps	(Gls)
1997–1999	Velbazhd Kyustendil	6	(0)
1999–2002	Cherno More	42	(2)
2002	Dobrudzha Dobrich	6	(0)
2003–2007	Beroe Stara Zagora	53	(5)
2007–2008	Dunav Ruse		
2008–2009	Rodopa Smolyan		
2009–2010	Dunav Ruse		
2011–2012	Eisbachtaler Sportfreunde	49	(20)
2013–2014	Vereya		

Managerial career
- 2014–2017: Dunav Ruse (assistant)
- 2017: Vereya II
- 2017–2018: Botev Galabovo
- 2018: Vereya
- 2018–2020: Dunav Ruse
- 2020–2021: Neftochimic Burgas
- 2022: Rilski Sportist Samokov
- 2022–2023: Dunav Ruse
- * Club domestic league appearances and goals

Lyudmil Kirov (Bulgarian: Людмил Киров; born 16 February 1976) is a Bulgarian football coach and a former player.

== Career ==
Born in Ruse, Kirov began his career in the local Dunav. In June 1998 he went in PFC Velbazhd from town Kyustendil. For one season in Velbazhd Kirov played in only six caps. In next season he went in Cherno More. For the club from Varna he played in 46 caps and scored seven goals. He then played for Beroe Stara Zagora and Dunav Rousse. In July 2008 he signed with Rodopa Smolyan.
