= Ivaylo Vasilev (footballer, born 1987) =

Bulgarian footballer

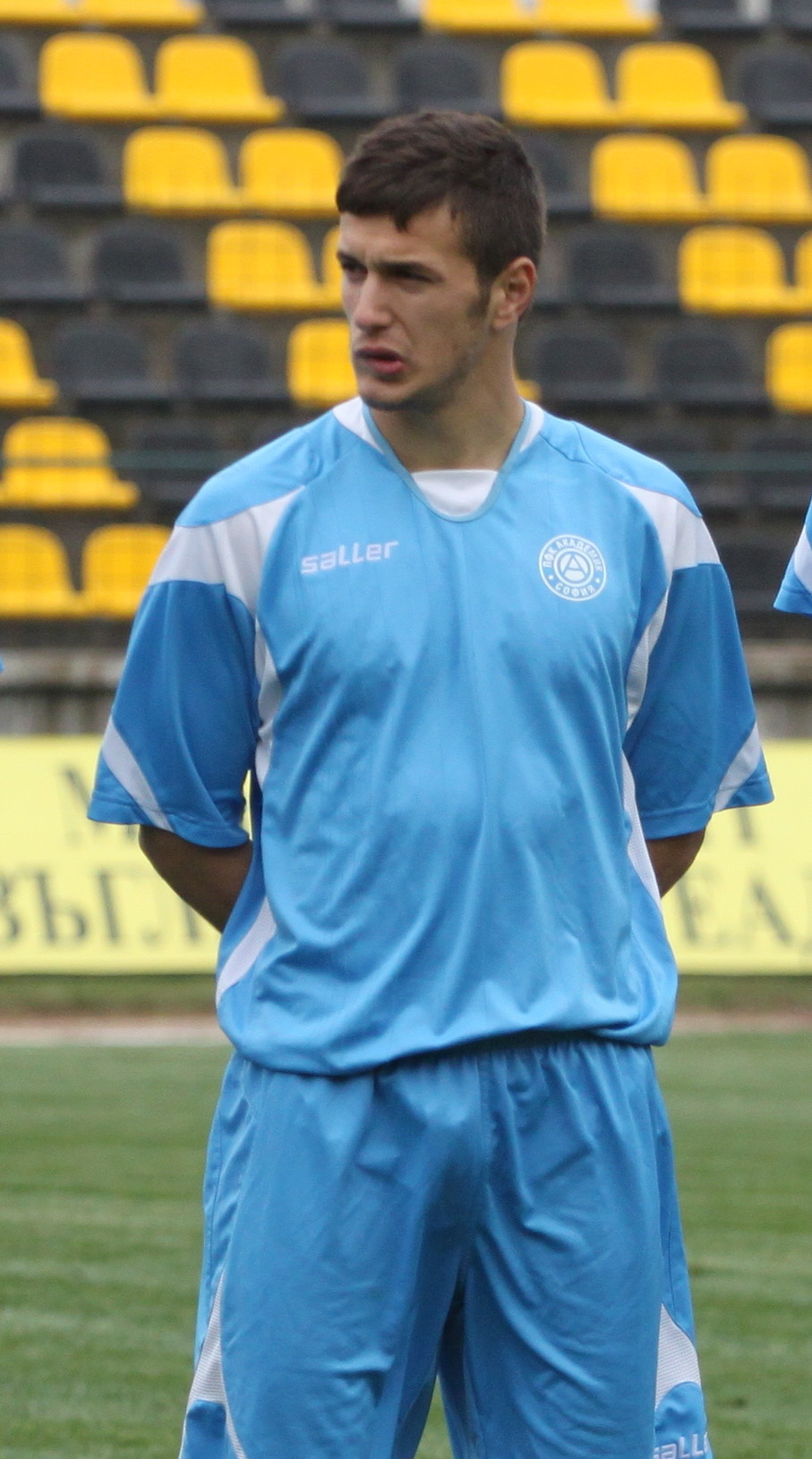
- Vasilev as a player in 2011

Personal information
- Full name: Ivaylo Ventsislavov Vasilev
- Date of birth: 1 July 1987 (age 39)
- Place of birth: Bulgaria
- Height: 1.83 m (6 ft 0 in)
- Positions: Right back; wide midfielder

Team information
- Current team: Sportist Svoge (head coach)

Senior career*
Years	Team	Apps	(Gls)
2008–2009	Belite orli	21	(0)
2009–2012	Akademik Sofia	27	(1)

Managerial career
- 2014–2016: Septemvri Sofia (youth coach)
- 2017: Spartak Pleven (assistant)
- 2017–2020: Slavia Sofia (youth coach)
- 2020–2021: Sportist Svoge
- 2021: Levski Lom
- * Club domestic league appearances and goals

Ivaylo Vasilev (Bulgarian: Ивайло Василев) is a Bulgarian professional football coach and former player who last served as the head coach of Levski Lom.
