= PFC Neftochimic Burgas =

Neftochimic Burgas
- Full name: Football Club Neftochimic Burgas 1962
- Nicknames: The Sheiks (Шейховете), The Greens (Зелените)
- Founded: 7 January 2015; 11 years ago
- Ground: Stadion Lazur,
- Capacity: 18 037
- Owner: FC Neftochimic Burgas 1962 NBFC
- Chairman: Plamen Nikolov
- Head coach: Dimcho Nenov
- League: Third League
- 2024–25: А RFG, 1st (promoted)
- Website: neftochimic.com
Home colours	Away colours

Neftochimic (Bulgarian: Нефтохимик) is a Bulgarian professional association football club based in Burgas, which currently competes in Third League, the third tier of the Bulgarian football league system. The team plays its home games at the local.

Originally established in 1962 under the name Stroitel Burgas and renamed to Neftochimic in 1964, the club was closely affiliated with the Neftochim petroleum refinery in Burgas. Neftochimic saw little success until the 1990s, when considerable financial investments were made in the club. This resulted in a debut promotion to the A Group in 1994. Neftochimic established itself as a regular top tier club in the next decade, even managing to qualify for European competitions. Financial problems began in the early 2000s, the club was rebranded as Naftex Burgas but was relegated from the top flight in 2006. After that, the club was dissolved in 2009, but re-established shortly after under the current name. The reformed club managed to play two seasons in the A Group, 2013–14, and 2016–17, after which it declined once more to the point where it currently competes, the amateur levels of Bulgarian football.

== History ==
=== Ancestors ===
==== PFC Neftochimic Burgas ====

On 6 July 2009, Naftex Burgas stopped its existence. On 7 July the amateur football club Athletic was renamed to Neftochimic 1986 and was subsequently declared by the owners as a successor of the old team. During the following 2010–11 season the team finished second, completing a quick return to professional football. On 27 June 2014 it was announced that the club was dissolved due to financial debts.

Neftochimic also won the 2011 Bulgarian Amateur Football League Cup.

==== Master Burgas/PFC Burgas ====
The club was founded in 2009 as Football Club Master. On 19 June 2014, the BFU confirmed Benkovski Byala's withdrawal from the 2014–15 B PFG and officially invited Master Burgas to take their spot as the 2nd placed team in the Southeast V AFG.

On 22 June, the club announced it has accepted the invitation, and in addition will change its name to PFC Burgas and switch colors from red and white to blue and white, similar to the flag of Burgas.

=== The New Neftochimic (2015–present) ===
==== Professional divisions (2015–2018) ====
Logo used from 2015 to 2021.

On 7 January 2015, it was announced that PFC Burgas and the newly established team SNC Neftochimic Burgas, claiming to be the successor of PFC Naftex Burgas, are going to merge in the end of the season and start the next season under the name PFC Neftochimic Burgas 1962. Neftochimic Burgas 1962 started the 2015–16 season in B Group on the place of PFC Burgas. The team finished 12th, but was administratively promoted to the new Bulgarian First League.

On 3 June 2017, the team lost the playoff match against Vitosha Bistritsa and was relegated from the Bulgarian First League. On 23 June 2017, the team announced that they will play mostly with youth team players due to financial troubles and so most of U19 team were promoted to the first team with Nikolay Krastev as manager and Stanislav Zhekov as his assistant, while most of the players from last season would be released.

==== Relegation and Third Division (2018–2019) ====
On 15 August 2017, it was announced that Lokomotiv Burgas would merge with the team, making Sutherland Global Services the new owners of the team. The 2017–18 season was very poor for "the Sheikhs", as they won only 2 games in the Second League, and were relegated to the third tier, the Third Amateur Football League.

In the new season Neftochimic managed to win promotion back to Second League, finishing 1st, after dominating the league with 29 wins, 3 draws and just 2 losses. They managed to defeat city rivals FC Chernomorets 1919 Burgas on two occasions.

==== Back to Second Division (2019–2021) ====
In their first season back with the professionals, Neftochimic managed to finish 5th, just before the league was stopped due to the COVID-19 pandemic just 9 points behind the 3rd in the league Montana who were granted promotion. "The Sheikhs" started the season playing their home games Arena Sozopol, due to the lack of financial support. In their first home game Neftochimic managed to defeat their long time rivals FC Spartak Varna with a 5:0 win.

On 22 November 2019 Neftochimic signed a 5-year sponsorship deal with Bulgarian betting company "efbet", which made a financial agreement with Stadion Lazur's owner Mitko Sabev to bring the club back to its original home, renaming and re-branding it to "Efbet Arena Burgas".

On 4 November 2021 the professional football license of Neftochimic was revoked by the Licensing commission of the Bulgarian Football Union as a result of the club not following financial fair play rules and outstanding payments towards personnel and state institutions. In the following days the team was to be removed from the group and its matches annulled. On 19 November the BFU confirmed its decision and removed Neftochimic from the group, annulling all their fixtures played until that point.

==== Restart from 5th league (2022–present) ====
The team joined B Regional League, FC Neftochimic's return to the amateur leagues was nothing short of spectacular. In their first season, they achieved an impressive record of 16 wins, 2 draws, and 0 losses from 18 matches, boasting a remarkable goal difference of 119 scored goals against just 9 conceded. This performance earned them a total of 50 points, setting a new record for their group.

Following this success, Neftochimic quickly secured promotion to the A Regional Group in 2023. In their debut season at this level, they continued their winning streak with 20 victories, 2 draws, and no losses out of 22 matches. Their goal difference soared to 70 goals scored while conceding only 9, which allowed them to qualify for the playoffs.

In the playoffs, Neftochimic faced off against FC Lokomotiv (Stara Zagora) in a tense match held in Haskovo. The game ended dramatically, with Neftochimic ultimately losing after a penalty shootout

== Rivalries ==
Since the beginning of the 21st century, Neftochimic Burgas' most intense rivalry has been with their fellow city club, Chernomorets Burgas. This rivalry emerged after the establishment of PSFC Chernomorets Burgas in 2005, a club which, in the years following its founding, would come under the same ownership as Neftochimic. Tensions between the two sides reached a peak when Chernomorets assumed control of Neftochimic’s stadium, ejecting the club from its home ground. Furthermore, Chernomorets rebranded the stadium, changing its color scheme from Neftochimic’s iconic green to blue, symbolizing the dramatic shift in the city’s football landscape. This altercation created a deep sense of animosity between the two clubs and their supporters, which remains one of the most heated rivalries in Bulgarian football.

Historically, Neftochimic has also maintained strong rivalries with teams from other cities, most notably Spartak Varna. The rivalry with Spartak began to take shape in the late 1990s, as both clubs frequently competed for regional dominance. Matches between Neftochimic and Spartak Varna are often characterized by high tension both on and off the pitch, with fan interactions frequently escalating into confrontations.

Another significant rivalry developed in the 2000s with Beroe Stara Zagora, another team in the region. Encounters between Neftochimic and Beroe are often marked by fierce competition, and games between the two sides have been notorious for crowd disturbances, particularly involving the ultra fans of both teams. The intense atmosphere surrounding these matches has further cemented the fierce nature of the rivalry.

These rivalries, fueled by local pride and historical context, continue to play a major role in shaping the competitive spirit of Neftochimic Burgas in Bulgarian football.

== Honours ==
- Third League:
  - Winners (1): 2018–19
- A RFG Burgas:
  - Winners (2): 2023–24 / 2024-25
- B RFG Burgas:
  - Winners (1): 2022–23

== Club colours ==
Historically, Neftochimic Burgas has primarily used a kit featuring a green and black striped shirt, paired with black shorts and green socks. Alternatively, the team has also worn an all-green kit. In some instances, they have sported green shirts with white shorts or a green and white striped design. For their away kit, Neftochimic has traditionally favored yellow or white kits.

=== Kit history ===
Period	Kit manufacturer	Shirt partner
2015–2018	(Bulgaria) Krasiko	Masterhouse
2019–2020	(Bulgaria) Krasiko	Efbet
2021–2022	(Germany) Uhlsport	Efbet
2022-2023	(Bulgaria) Krasiko	Efbet
2024-	(Bulgaria) Krasiko	Lego Group 5

== Players ==
=== Current squad ===
As of 1 January 1998

Note: Flags indicate national team as defined under FIFA eligibility rules; some limited exceptions apply. Players may hold more than one non-FIFA nationality.

No.	Pos.	Nation	Player
1	GK	BUL	Veselin Shulev
2	DF	BUL	Malin Orachev
3	DF	BUL	Gancho Evtimov
4	DF	BUL	Krasimir Denev
5	DF	BUL	Veliyan Parushev
6	MF	BUL	Blagomir Mitrev
7	FW	BUL	Anton Spasov
8	MF	BUL	Stanimir Dimitrov
9	FW	BUL	Milen Georgiev
10	MF	BUL	Mitko Trendafilov
11	MF	BUL	Iliya Gruev
12	GK	BUL	Yordan Gospodinov

No.	Pos.	Nation	Player
13	DF	BUL	Veselin Branimirov
14	MF	BUL	Krasimir Dimitrov
15	DF	BUL	Todor Yanchev
16	FW	BUL	Petar Yankov
18	FW	BUL	Vesko Petkov
19	FW	BUL	Georgi Chilikov
20	MF	BUL	Todor Kiselichkov
21	FW	BUL	Stancho Tsonev
22	GK	BUL	Dancho Yorgov
24	DF	BUL	Rosen Petrov
25	MF	BUL	Radostin Kishishev

== Notable players ==
Had international caps for their respective countries, held any club record, or have more than 100 league appearance. Players whose name is listed in bold represented their countries.

Bulgaria

- (Bulgaria) **Yordan Gospodinov**
- (Bulgaria) **Kostadin Hazurov**
- (Bulgaria) **Ventsislav Hristov**
- (Bulgaria) **Galin Ivanov**
- (Bulgaria) **Stoyan Kolev**

- (Bulgaria) **Dimo Krastev**
- (Bulgaria) **Iliya Milanov**
- (Bulgaria) **Mariyan Ognyanov**
- (Bulgaria) Stanislav Zhekov

Asia

- (China) Liu Ziming

== Managers ==
Dates	Name	Honours
2015	(Bulgaria) Radostin Kishishev	
2015	(Bulgaria) Atanas Atanasov	
2015–2016	(Bulgaria) Diyan Petkov	
2016	(Bulgaria) Gancho Evtimov (Bulgaria) Dimcho Nenov	(interim)
2016−2017	(Bulgaria) Hristo Yanev	
2017	(Bulgaria) Nikolay Krastev	
2017	(Bulgaria) Blagomir Mitrev	
2018–2020	(Bulgaria) Diyan Petkov	
2020	(Bulgaria) Viktorio Pavlov	
2020–2021	(Bulgaria) Diyan Donchev	
2021	(Bulgaria) Lyudmil Kirov	
2021	(Bulgaria) Krasimir Mechev	
2021	(Bulgaria) Kaloyan Genov	
2021	(Bulgaria) Lyudmil Kirov	
2021	(Bulgaria) Vladimir Ivanov	
2022–	(Bulgaria) Stanislav Zhekov	

== Detailed season history ==
Results of league and cup competitions by season
Season	League										Bulgarian Cup	Other competitions	Top goalscorer	
Season	Division	Level	P	W	D	L	F	A	Pts	Pos	Bulgarian Cup	Other competitions	Top goalscorer	
2015–16	B Group	2	30	8	14	8	31	39	38	12th ↑	First round		(Bulgaria) Dimitar Georgiev (Bulgaria) Borislav Borisov	4
2016–17	First League	1	32	8	7	17	33	47	31	12th ↓	Second round		(Bulgaria) Ivan Valchanov	4
2017–18	Second League	2	30	2	3	25	15	62	9	16th ↓	First round		(Bulgaria) Tsvetan Filipov (Bulgaria) Daniel Stoyanov	3
2018–19	Third League	3	34	29	3	2	88	21	90	1st ↑	DNQ		(Bulgaria) Deyan Hristov	30
2019–20	Second League	2	21	10	3	8	35	29	33	5th	Round of 32		(Bulgaria) Zhivko Petkov	8
2020–21	Second League	2	30	7	6	17	27	61	27	14th	Preliminary round		(France) Mohamed Brahimi	5
2021–22	Second League	2	16	1	3	12	12	43	—	— ↓	Preliminary round		(Bulgaria) Rostislav Danchev	3
2022–23	B Regional League Burgas	5	18	16	2	0	119	9	50	1st ↑	DNQ		(Bulgaria) Martin Mechkov	31
2023–24	А Regional League Burgas	4	22	20	2	0	70	9	62	1st	DNQ			
2024–25	А Regional League Burgas	4	22	20	2	0	102	8	62	1st ↑	DNQ			
2025–26	Third League	3									TBA			
**Green marks a season followed by promotion, red a season followed by relegation.**

== Goalscoring and appearance records ==
As of 12 May 2017

**Most appearances for the club in the First League**

Rank	Name	Career	Appearances
1	(Bulgaria) Ivan Valchanov	2016–2017	29
2	(Bulgaria) Nikolay Dyulgerov	2016–2017	28
3	(Bulgaria) Yanko Georgiev	2016–2017	27
4	(Bulgaria) Borislav Borisov	2015–2016	26
5	(Romania) Sergiu Homei	2016–2017	25
–	(Bulgaria) Zhivko Hadzhiev	2015–2017	25
7	(Bulgaria) Stanislav Zhekov	2015–2016; 2017–2019	24
—	(Bulgaria) Angel Granchov	2016–2017	24
9	(Bulgaria) Stanimir Andonov	2015–2016	23
–	(Bulgaria) Tihomir Trifonov	2015–2016	23

**Most goals for the club in the league**

Rank	Name	Career	Goals
1	(Bulgaria) Ivan Valchanov	2016–2017	6
–	(Bulgaria) Borislav Borisov	2015–2016	6
3	(Bulgaria) Dimitar Georgiev	2015	5
4	(Bulgaria) Galin Ivanov	2017	4
–	(Bulgaria) Ventsislav Hristov	2016–2017	4
6	(Bulgaria) Stefan Nedelchev	2015–2016	3
–	(Bulgaria) Lyubomir Lubenov	2015	3
–	(Bulgaria) Stanislav Zhekov	2015–2016; 2017–	3
–	(Bulgaria) Emanuil Manev	2016–2017	3
–	(Bulgaria) Nikolay Dyulgerov	2016–2017	3
