= Blagomir Mitrev =

Bulgarian footballer and manager

Personal information
- Date of birth: 28 May 1972 (age 54)
- Place of birth: Stara Zagora, Bulgaria
- Height: 1.73 m (5 ft 8 in)
- Position: Defensive midfielder

Senior career*
Years	Team	Apps	(Gls)
1990–1995	Beroe	90	(10)
1995–2005	Neftochimic	210	(20)
2009	Neftochimic	3	(0)

International career
1992–1993	Bulgaria U21	8	(0)
1998	Bulgaria	1	(0)

Managerial career
- 2017: Neftochimic
- 2018: Vereya
- * Club domestic league appearances and goals

Blagomir Mitrev (Bulgarian: Благомир Митрев; born 28 May 1972) is a Bulgarian former footballer who played as a midfielder. He most recently served as manager of Vereya.

== Club career ==
Mitrev spent his entire career in Bulgaria, earning a silver medal with Neftochimic in 1997. He also collected 8 caps for the junior and made 1 appearance for the senior national team. Following his retirement from the game, he has been involved in various official capacities with Beroe and Neftochimic. He also served as an assistant to Ivan Vutov at Santos from Ouagadougou in Burkina Faso.

== Coaching career ==
On 6 October 2017, Mitrev was appointed as manager of Neftochimic. In January 2018, he was announced as the new head coach of Vereya, succeeding Ilian Iliev.
