= Viktorio Pavlov =

Bulgarian footballer

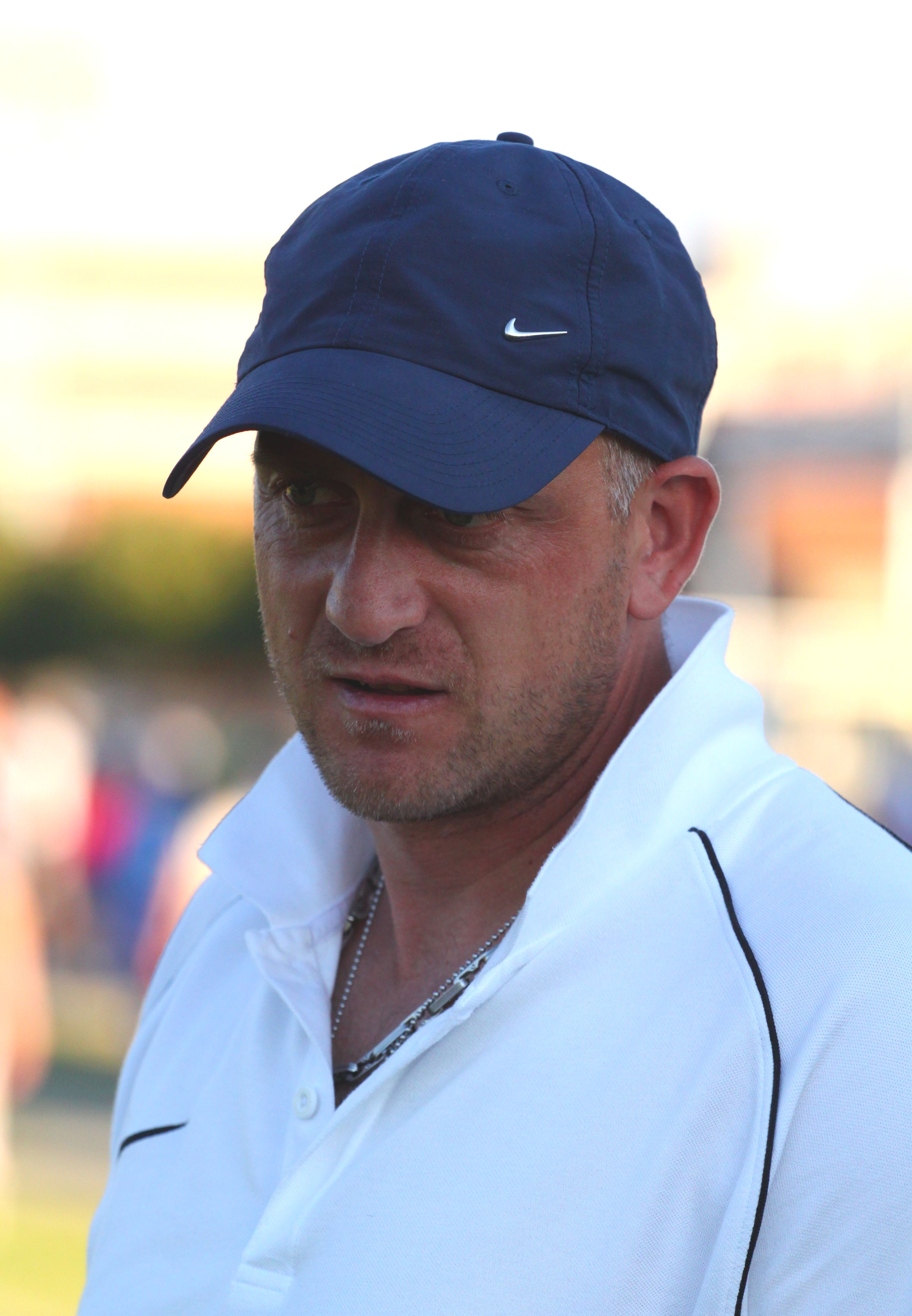

Personal information
- Full name: Viktorio Dimitrov Pavlov
- Date of birth: 28 May 1973 (age 53)
- Place of birth: Sofia, Bulgaria
- Height: 1.87 m (6 ft 2 in)
- Position: Midfielder

Team information
- Current team: Vitosha Bistritsa (U19 manager)

Senior career*
Years	Team	Apps	(Gls)
1989–1995	CSKA Sofia	59	(6)
1992	→ Lokomotiv Sofia (loan)	2	(0)
1993–1994	→ Shumen (loan)		
1996	Shumen		
1996–1999	Levski Sofia	58	(2)
1999	Logroñés	5	(0)
2000–2001	Levski Sofia	7	(0)
2001	Slavia Sofia	3	(0)
2003–2004	Panserraikos	10	(0)

International career
1996–1998	Bulgaria	3	(0)

Managerial career
- 2005–2008: Levski Sofia II
- 2008: Loko Mezdra
- 2008–2012: Levski Sofia II
- 2012: Levski Sofia (caretaker)
- 2012–2014: Levski Sofia (assistant and youth coach)
- 2014: Botev Vratsa
- 2015–2017: Bulgaria U17
- 2020: Neftochimic
- 2021–: Vitosha Bistritsa (U19 manager)
- * Club domestic league appearances and goals

Viktorio Pavlov (Bulgarian: Викторио Павлов) (born 28 May 1973) is a former Bulgarian footballer who most recently managed Neftochimic.

== Playing career ==
For the majority of his career Pavlov played in the top division of Bulgarian football, most notably for Bulgarian powerhouses CSKA Sofia and Levski Sofia, while also having short spells in Spain and Greece. Between 1996 and 1998, Pavlov earned 3 caps for Bulgaria.

== Coaching career ==
Following his retirement, he has mainly worked as an assistant and youth team coach with Levski Sofia and also managed Lokomotiv Mezdra, Botev Vratsa, and the Bulgaria U17 national side. Between late June and early October 2020, Pavlov was head coach of Neftochimic.

In July 2021, Pavlov was appointed manager of Vitosha Bistritsa's U19's.
