= Nikolay Zhechev =

Bulgarian footballer and manager

Personal information
- Date of birth: 22 October 1974 (age 52)
- Place of birth: Bulgaria
- Positions: Defender; midfielder

Team information
- Current team: Nesebar (manager)

Senior career*
Years	Team	Apps	(Gls)
- Tundzha Yambol
- Zagorets Nova Zagora
2000–2004	Chernomorets Burgas		
2004–2009	Nesebar		
2009–2010	Ravda	9	(1)
2011–2012	Tundzha Yambol		

Managerial career
- 2011–2012: Tundzha Yambol (playing coach)
- 2012–2017: Nesebar (assistant)
- 2017–: Nesebar
- * Club domestic league appearances and goals

Nikolay Zhechev (Bulgarian: Николай Жечев; born 22 October 1974) is a former Bulgarian footballer and currently manager of Nesebar.

== Career ==
Zhechev's teams include Nesebar and Chernomorets Burgas.
