= Diyan Petkov =

Bulgarian footballer and manager

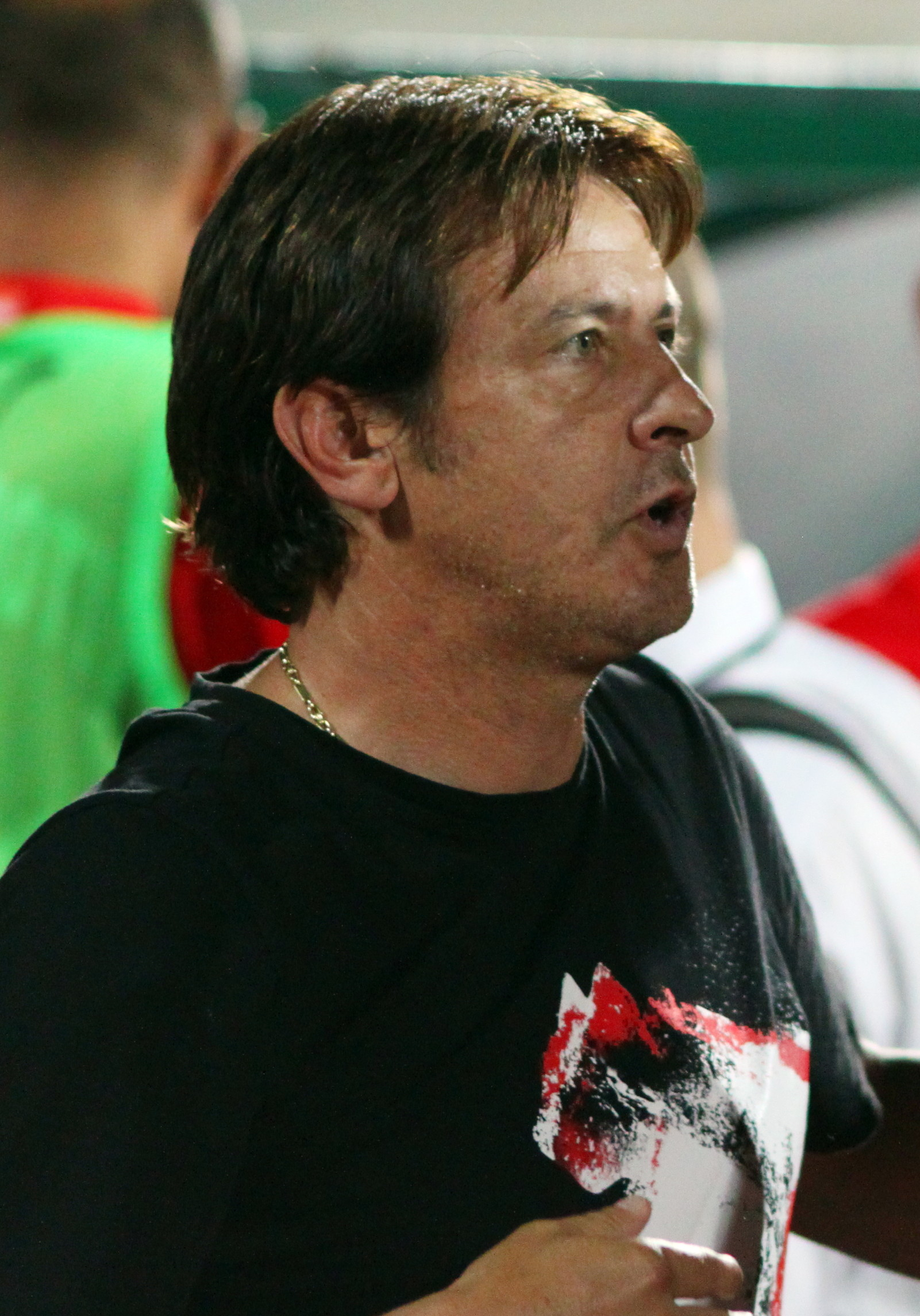

Personal information
- Full name: Diyan Petkov Dimov
- Date of birth: 4 August 1967 (age 59)
- Place of birth: Burgas, Bulgaria
- Height: 1.70 m (5 ft 7 in)
- Position: Midfielder

Team information
- Current team: Neftochimic

Senior career*
Years	Team	Apps	(Gls)
1984–1988	Naftex Burgas	94	(26)
1988–1993	Chernomorets Burgas	137	(35)
1993–1994	Lokomotiv Plovdiv	21	(3)
1994–1997	Lokomotiv Sofia	71	(23)
1997	Belenenses	6	(1)
1998	Lokomotiv Sofia	9	(0)
1998–2000	Naftex Burgas	39	(7)
2001	Lokomotiv Sofia	4	(0)
2001–2002	Slanchev Bryag	21	(6)
Total		405	(103)

International career
1992	Bulgaria	1	(0)

Managerial career
- 2002–2005: Chernomorets Pomorie
- 2005–2006: Chernomorets Burgas
- 2007–2008: Chernomorets Burgas (assistant)
- 2009: Naftex
- 2009: Sliven
- 2010–2011: Lokomotiv Sofia
- 2012–2013: Chernomorets Burgas (scout)
- 2014–2015: Lokomotiv Sofia (assistant)
- 2015–2016: Neftochimic
- 2017: Neftochimic (assistant)
- 2018–: Neftochimic
- * Club domestic league appearances and goals

Diyan Petkov Dimov (Bulgarian: Диян Петков Димов; born 4 August 1967) is a former Bulgarian footballer and currently manager of Neftochimic Burgas.

== Career ==
He played for Naftex Burgas, Chernomorets Burgas, Lokomotiv Plovdiv, Lokomotiv Sofia, Nesebar/Slanchev Bryag and C.F. Os Belenenses. In 'A' group has 268 matches and 64 goals. Secondly in 1995 and third place in the 1996 with Lokomotiv Sofia and a finalist for the Bulgarian Cup in 1989 on a Chernomorets Burgas. In UEFA has 14 matches and 2 goals (4 matches with 1 goal for Lokomotiv Sofia and 2 matches with 1 goal for Chernomorets Burgas in SSC, 4 matches for Lokomotiv Sofia and 2 matches Naftex Burgas for the tournament for the Cup of the UEFA).

== International career ==
He played for the Bulgaria national football team only 1 game.

== Coaching career ==
Petkov is former coach of Pomorie, Chernomorets Burgas and Naftex Burgas. On 1 July 2009 he was officially presented senior as coach of Sliven and on 3 November 2009 the Coach has quit the club, a replacement has not been named yet.

On 5 July 2017, Petkov was appointed as assistant manager of Neftochimic.
