= Second Professional Football League (Bulgaria) =

- Втора Професионална Футболна Λига
- Organising body: Bulgarian Football Union (BFU); Bulgarian Professional Football League (BPFL)
- Founded: 1950; 76 years ago
- Country: Bulgaria
- Divisions: 1
- Number of clubs: 18 (16 from 2027–28)
- Level on pyramid: 2
- Promotion to: First League
- Relegation to: Third League
- Domestic cup: Bulgarian Cup
- Current champions: Dunav Ruse (7th title) (2025–26)
- Most championships: Beroe Stara Zagora (9 titles)
- Broadcaster: Nova Broadcasting Group
- Website: http://old.fpleague.bg/index2.php
- Current: 2026–27 season

The Bulgarian Second Professional Football League (Bulgarian: Втора професионална футболна лига, romanized: Vtora Profesionalna Futbolna Liga), also known as Second League (Bulgarian: Втора Лига) or Vtora liga (currently known as Mr. Bit Second League for sponsorship reasons), is the second level of the Bulgarian football league system, below First League and above the Third League. Twenty teams take part in the league, each playing twice against all the other, once home and once away. Most matches are played on Saturdays and Sundays. The league is administered by the Bulgarian Professional Football League.

In 2016, the B Group's name was rebranded to Second Professional Football League.

== Competition format ==
A team receives 3 points for a win and 1 point for a draw. No points are awarded for a loss.

=== Promotion and relegation positions ===
For 2026–27 Season :

- First place (champion): Direct promotion to First Professional Football League.
- Second place (runner-up) and third place: Promotion playoff against the 13th place team from First Professional Football League.
- 13th place: Relegation playoff against the loser promotion playoff northeast and northwest of Third League.
- 14th to 20th place: Relegation to Third Amateur Football League.

== 2026–27 clubs ==
Location of teams in 2026–27 Second League

No. of teams	Province	Team(s)
2	Blagoevgrad	Pirin Blagoevgrad, Vihren Sandanski
2	Burgas	Chernomorets Burgas, Nesebar
2	Sofia	Rilski Sportist, Sportist Svoge
2	Veliko Tarnovo	Etar, Lokomotiv GO
1	Dobrich	Dobrudzha
1	Gabrovo	Yantra
1	Kyustendil	Marek
1	Montana	Montana
1	Pazardzhik	Hebar
1	Pleven	Spartak Pleven
1	Razgrad	Ludogorets Razgrad II
1	Sofia City	CSKA Sofia II
1	Stara Zagora	Beroe
1	Varna	Fratria

== History ==
Former B Group logo

=== B Republican Football Group ===
The B group was established in 1950 when the league was divided in two groups - North and South, in each group participating 10 teams. The first champions of the B Republican Football Group are Torpedo (Ruse) (North) and Spartak (Sofia) (South).

In season 1951 the group is only one - B Republican Football Group with 12 teams. The regulations are - in A Group are going the top team in the final standings from Sofia and the top two teams from the province (teams that aren't from Sofia).

In the next season 1952 the group is formed by 14 teams and from season 1953 the league is divided into five groups - Sofia B Group, North-West B Group, South-West B Group, North-East B Group and South-East B Group.

=== Second Professional Football Group ===
In the next seasons the league had many changes. In 2000 the Bulgarian Football Union changed the name of the division. The league is formed by 18 teams, not like previous seasons - 16 teams. To reduce the teams to 16 again in the next season the last six teams that finish in the final standings in the league were directly relegated.

=== First Professional Football League ===
Before the start of season 2001/2002 the league was again renamed. The championship started with 13 teams, because Lokomotiv (Plovdiv) and Belasitsa (Petrich) united with two teams from A Group - Lokomotiv with PFC Velbazhd Kyustendil and Belasitsa with PFC Hebar Pazardzhik. That meant, that this was the end of professional football in the towns of Kyustendil and Pazardzhik.

=== B Professional Football Group ===
Returning to the traditions of the B Republican Football Group was the creating of the B Professional Football Group. 16 teams participated in the league, each playing twice against all the other, once home and once away, with no play-offs.

Before the start of season 2005/2006 the Bulgarian Football Union decided to divide B Group in two groups - West B Group and East B Group with 14 teams in each group. Every team plays 13 matches as home team and 13 matches as away team. The two champions of the groups were directly promoted to A Group and the two teams that finished in second place in their group played a play-off for winning the final third place for promotion in A Group. On May 19, 2008 the two groups were extended to 16 teams. For season 2010/2011 the two groups were reduced again with 12 teams in each.

But just before the start of season 2011/2012 the number of teams in the two groups was again reduced - 10 teams in both West B Group and East B Group, with the winners of the groups directly promoting to A Group. The two teams that finished in second place in their group enter in a play-off for winning a place at the final play-off for promotion/relegation with the team that finished 14th in A Group.

Further changes were made before the start of season 2012/2013. The former format of B Group with the two groups (West and East) was replaced by a single division, formed by fourteen teams.

== Former champions (from season 2005–06) ==
The following table presents the former champions of B Group (until season 2011–12 it had separate champions about the zones East and West).

Season	Champion(s)		Top goalscorer	
2005–06	PFC Spartak 1918 (East)	PFC Rilski Sportist Samokov (West)	Georgi Hristov (18 goals); FC Maritsa Plovdiv	Miroslav Manolov (19 goals); Conegliano German F.C.
2006–07	PFC Chernomorets Burgas (East)	PFC Pirin Blagoevgrad (West)	Miroslav Mindev (18 goals); FC Sliven	Borislav Dichev (20 goals); PFC Vidima-Rakovski Sevlievo
2007–08	OFC Sliven 2000 (East)	PFC Lokomotiv Mezdra (West)	Miroslav Mindev (24 goals); Sliven	Atanas Nikolov (18 goals); Lokomotiv Mezdra
2008–09	PFC Beroe Stara Zagora (East)	PFC Montana (West)	Deyan Hristov (25 goals); Neftochimic Burgas	Ventsislav Ivanov (19 goals); PFC Montana
2009–10	PFC Kaliakra Kavarna (East)	PFC Vidima-Rakovski Sevlievo (West)	Borislav Rupanov (20 goals); OFC Nesebar	Angel Rusev and Vladislav Zlatinov (17 goals); PFC Vidima-Rakovski Sevlievo / PFC Bansko
2010–11	Ludogorets Razgrad (East)	FC Botev Vratsa (West)	Petar Atanasov (10 goals); PFC Brestnik 1948	Georgi Kalaydzhiev and Tihomir Kanev (11 goals); Bansko Team / FC Etar 1924 Veliko Tarnovo
2011–12	Etar 1924 (East)	Pirin Gotse Delchev (West)	Nikolay Pavlov (13 goals) FC Lyubimets	Vladislav Mirchev (9 goals) OFC Bdin Vidin
2012–13	Neftochimic Burgas		Blagoy Nakov (16 goals); Pirin Blagoevgrad	
2013–14	Marek Dupnitsa		Atanas Chipilov (13 goals); Bansko	
2014–15	Montana		Yanaki Smirnov (23 goals); Lokomotiv GO	
2015–16	Dunav Ruse		Vasil Kaloyanov and Tihomir Kanev (13 goals); Sozopol / Lokomotiv GO	
2016–17	Etar Veliko Tarnovo		Dimitar Georgiev (18 goals); Lokomotiv 1929 Sofia	
2017–18	Botev Vratsa		Svetoslav Dikov (25 goals); Tsarsko Selo Sofia	
2018–19	Tsarsko Selo Sofia		Georgi Minchev (29 goals); Tsarsko Selo Sofia	
2019–20	CSKA 1948 Sofia		Andon Gushterov (26 goals); CSKA 1948 Sofia	
2020–21	Pirin Blagoevgrad		Svetoslav Dikov (17 goals); Lokomotiv 1929 Sofia	
2021–22	Septemvri Sofia		Mariyan Tonev (19 goals); Maritsa Plovdiv	
2022–23	CSKA 1948 Sofia II		Yordan Dimitrov and Valentin Yoskov (15 goals); Dunav Ruse / CSKA 1948 Sofia II	
2023–24	Spartak Varna		Ahmed Ahmedov (21 goals); Spartak Varna	
2024–25	Dobrudzha		Denislav Angelov (21 goals); Fratria / Yantra Gabrovo	
2025–26	Dunav Ruse		Mark-Emilio Papazov (18 goals); CSKA Sofia II	
