= OFC Nesebar =

Bulgarian football club

- Full name: Municipal Football Club Nesebar
- Nickname: The Dolphins делфините
- Founded: 1946; 80 years ago
- Ground: Stadion Nesebar, Nesebar
- Capacity: 10,000
- Owner: Nesebar Municipality
- Chairman: Georgi Marinov
- Head coach: Vasil Banov
- League: Second League
- 2025–26: Southeast Third League, 1st (promoted)
- Website: https://ofcnesebar.com/
Home colours	Away colours	Third colours

Nesebar (Bulgarian: Несебър) is a Bulgarian municipal (Bulgarian: общински, pronounced obshtinski) association football club based in Nesebar, Burgas Province, currently competing in the Second League, the second tier of Bulgarian football.

The club’s greatest success was promotion to the A Group in 2004, where the team played one season before being relegated.

== History ==
The club was established in 1946 under the name Chernomorets Nesebar. After 1949 team is divided to Dynamo and Cherveno Zname. In 1957, the company for physical culture and sport Chernomorets is refounded with the team. From 1979 to 2001 the team is called Slanchev Bryag. Еxception are the years from 1993 to 1996 when the team is called PFC Nesebar. From 2001 team is called Nesebar, as from 2012 team is OFC (Municipal football club).

Nesebar won promotion to the A Group during the 2003–04 season—the only time the club has played in the top level of Bulgarian football—with a third-place finish. In their first season in the top flight they were relegated after only five wins.

In 2009–10 season, Nesebar finished second in the B Group and qualified for the promotion play-off, but were defeated by Akademik Sofia 2–1. Two years later, they slipped into the third division.

Nesebar managed to return to the Second League in 2016, after four years of absence. The team managed to stay in the second level three seasons, with a notable fifth-place finish during the 2017–18 season. Relegation followed after the 2018–19 season, after which the club spent returned to the Third League. In 2023, Nesebar finished in first place in the Southeast Third League, but refused promotion to the Second League due to financial reasons. The club then won the league again the following year becoming back to back champions.

=== Historical names ===
Years	Names
1946–1979	Chernomorets Nesebar
1979–1993	Slanchev Bryag
1993–1996	PFC Nesebar
1996–2001	Slanchev Bryag
2001–2012	PFC Nesebar
2012	ОFC Nesebar

== Honours ==
- Third League:
  - Winners (7): 1989–90, 1999–2000, 2002–03, 2015–16, 2022–23, 2023–24, 2025–26
- A Regional Group:
  - Winners (2): 1973–74, 1977–78
- Cup of Bulgarian Amateur Football League
  - Winners (1): 2016

== Current squad ==
As of 1 July 2026

Note: Flags indicate national team as defined under FIFA eligibility rules; some limited exceptions apply. Players may hold more than one non-FIFA nationality.

No.	Pos.	Nation	Player
1	GK	BUL	Hristiyan Ivanov
3	DF	BUL	Danail Lastardzhiev
4	DF	BUL	Todor Petkov
5	DF	BUL	Plamen Dimov
7	FW	BUL	Nikola Gelin
8	MF	BUL	Viktor Kunev
9	FW	BUL	Ivan Kolev
10	MF	BUL	Valentin Dotsev
11	MF	BUL	Daniel Cabanelas
13	GK	BUL	Martin Sheytanov
14	DF	BUL	Dimitar Balinov

No.	Pos.	Nation	Player
15	MF	UKR	Oleksandr Klymenko
17	MF	ITA	Sedrick Kalombo
18	FW	BUL	Radoslav Terziev
19	MF	ALG	Mohamed Zeggai
20	MF	BUL	Petko Bonev
21	DF	BUL	Stoyan Pergelov
22	MF	BUL	Daniel Yanev
27	DF	BUL	Nikolay Kostov
77	MF	BUL	Stefan Statev
88	MF	BUL	Maksimilyan Simeonov
99	FW	BUL	Kristiyan Parashkevov

For recent transfers, see Transfers summer 2024.

== Notable players ==
Had international caps for their respective countries, held any club record, or had more than 100 league appearances. Players whose name is listed in bold represented their countries.

Bulgaria

- (Bulgaria) **Ivaylo Dimitrov**
- (Bulgaria) **Milen Georgiev**
- (Bulgaria) **Ventsislav Hristov**
- (Bulgaria) Strati Iliev
- (Bulgaria) Pavel Kolev
- (Bulgaria) Nikolay Kostov
- (Bulgaria) **Yordan Linkov**
- (Bulgaria) Diyan Moldovanov
- (Bulgaria) **Diyan Petkov**
- (Bulgaria) **Boyan Peykov**
- (Bulgaria) **Milen Radukanov**
- (Bulgaria) Nikolay Rusev
- (Bulgaria) Ivan Stoyanov
- (Bulgaria) **Mitko Trendafilov**

== Season to season ==
**Season**	**Division**	**Place**	**Bulgarian Cup**
1962–63	A RFG	12	DNQ
-			
1965–66	A RFG	9	DNQ
-			
1969–70	A RFG	11	DNQ
1970–71	A RFG	9	DNQ
1971–72	A RFG	3	DNQ
1972–73	A RFG	3	DNQ
1973–74	A RFG	1	DNQ
1974–75	B PFG	11	Preliminary round
1975–76	B PFG	4	Round of 32
1976–77	B PFG	18	Round of 32
1977–78	A RFG	1	DNQ
1978–79	B PFG	13	Round of 32
1979–80	B PFG	10	Round of 32
1980–81	B PFG	4	Second round
1981–82	B PFG	14	DNQ
1982–83	B PFG	18	DNQ

**Season**	**Division**	**Place**	**Bulgarian Cup**
1983–84	V AFG	6	DNQ
1984–85	V AFG	5	40th
1985–86	V AFG	12	DNQ
1986–87	V AFG	5	DNQ
1987–88	V AFG	4	DNQ
1988–89	V AFG	6	DNQ
1989–90	V AFG	1	Unknown
1990–91	B PFG	16	Third round
1991–92	B PFG	15	Round of 16
1992–93	B PFG	16	Fourth round
1993–94	B PFG	9	First round
1994–95	B PFG	13	DNQ
1995–96	V AFG	2	DNQ
1996–97	V AFG	5	DNQ
1997–98	V AFG	14	DNQ
1998–99	V AFG	6	DNQ
1999–00	V AFG	1	Second round
2000–01	B PFG	6	Second round

**Season**	**Division**	**Place**	**Bulgarian Cup**
2001–02	V AFG	4	Second round
2002–03	V AFG	1	Round of 16
2003–04	B PFG	3	First round
2004–05	A PFG	15	Second round
2005–06	B PFG	8	Second round
2006–07	B PFG	4	Second round
2007–08	B PFG	4	First round
2008–09	B PFG	6	Quarterfinals
2009–10	B PFG	2	First round
2010–11	B PFG	5	First round
2011–12	B PFG	9	Second round
2012–13	V AFG	6	DNQ
2013–14	V AFG	5	DNQ
2014–15	V AFG	10	DNQ
2015–16	V AFG	1	Second round
2016–17	Second League	9	First round
2017–18	Second League	5	First round
2018–19	Second League	15	First round
2019-20	V AFG	9	DNQ

- Seasons in A Group: 1
- Seasons in B Group (now Second League): 25
- Seasons in V Group: 18
- Seasons in A Regional Group: 8
