= 2014–15 V AFG =

Bulgarian V Football Group
- Season: 2014–15

The 2014–15 V Football Group season was the 65th season of the Bulgarian V Group. The group comprises the third level of the Bulgarian football pyramid and is divided into four geographic regions:North-West, North-East, South-East, and South-West.

The top team from each of the divisions of the amateur football group (AFG) will be directly promoted to B Group for season 2015–16. The bottom two teams of each division will be directly relegated to their respective regional groups at the fourth level in the football league system for next season.

== Changes from season 2013–14 ==
=== Club Movements Between V Group and B Group ===
The champions of the four 2013–14 V AFG divisions were promoted to the 2014–15 B PFG: Benkovski Byala from V AFG North-East and Sozopol from V AFG South-East, Lokomotiv 2012 Mezdra from V AFG North-West and Pirin Blagoevgrad from V AFG South-West.

In return, four teams relegated to V AFG: Vitosha Bistritsa, Kaliakra Kavarna, Dunav Ruse and Akademik Svishtov.

=== Club Movements Between V Group and the Regional Groups ===
- North-East: Silistra 2009, Shumen 2010 and Veliki Preslav relegated last season to regional divisions. On 17 June 2014 Benkovski Byala, champions from last year, declared their incapability to participate in B Group, therefore they decided to remain in the third division. The next team eligible for promotion, Svetkavitsa Targovishte declared the same, therefore last season there was no promoted team from the North-East division. The only new team this season, coming from the regional divisions, is Dorostol 2003.
- North-West: Gigant Belene and Tryavna relegated from last season to regional divisions. Due to the replacement of initial participants into B Group with new ones, the second-placed, Lokomotiv Gorna Oryahovitsa, was promoted. The only new team this season, coming from the regional divisions, is Juventus Malchika.
- South-East: Straldzha relegated from last season to regional divisions, while Brestnik resigned after just two rounds of play. Due to the replacement of initial participants into B Group with new ones, the second- and third-placed, Master Burgas under its new name FC Burgas and Vereya Stara Zagora were promoted. New teams, coming from A PFG, were supposed to be Neftochimic Burgas and Lyubimets, as they have not received professional license. However by 25 July, the final deadline for application for participation, both teams have not submitted any documents. The new teams, coming from the regional divisions, are Marista Plovdiv, Pomorie, Rodopa Smolyan, Stara Zagora and Elhovo. Shortly before the beginning of the championship, on 5 and 7 August Rodopa and Elhovo declared their resignation of participation due to organizational and financial reasons. Since this occurred two days before the start of the season, the regional cell of Bulgarian Football Union were unable to make new draw. This means that two teams will rest each round and that there will be no relegating teams, if there are no teams, coming from B Group at the end of the season.
- South-West: Botev Ihtiman and Septemvri Sofia relegated from last season to regional divisions. Due to the replacement of initial participants into B Group with new ones, the second-placed, Septemvri Simitli, was promoted. New team, coming from A PFG, is Pirin Gotse Delchev as it has not received professional license. The new teams, coming from the regional divisions, are Conegliano German and Rilski Sportist Samokov.

== North-East V AFG ==
Location of teams in North-East V AFG 2013-14

North-East V AFG
- Season: 2014–15
- Champions: Dunav Ruse
- Relegated: Provadia; Dorostol 2003
- Top goalscorer: Vasil Tachev (15 goals)
- Biggest home win: Dunav 13−0 Suvorovo (15 November 2014)
- Biggest away win: Dorostol 0−7 Chernomorets Balchik (16 November 2014); Shumen 0−7 Kaliakra (2 May 2015)
- Highest scoring: Dunav 13−0 Suvorovo (15 November 2014)

Pos	Team	Pld	W	D	L	GF	GA	GD	Pts	Promotion or relegation
1	Dunav Ruse (C, P)	30	28	1	1	121	11	+110	85	Promotion to B Group
2	Chernomorets Balchik	30	24	4	2	85	14	+71	76	
3	Kaliakra Kavarna	30	23	3	4	93	21	+72	72	
4	Suvorovo	30	19	2	9	47	38	+9	59	
5	Ticha 1948 Dolni Chiflik	30	17	2	11	59	38	+21	53	
6	Benkovski Byala	30	15	4	11	46	39	+7	49	
7	Septemvri Tervel	30	15	1	14	43	46	−3	46	
8	Svetkavitsa Targovishte	30	14	3	13	42	44	−2	45	
9	Kubrat	30	14	3	13	48	45	+3	45	
10	Botev Novi Pazar	30	12	2	16	45	61	−16	38	
11	Belitsa	30	10	4	16	39	58	−19	34	
12	Shumen 1929	30	9	5	16	41	52	−11	32	
13	Dve Mogili	30	6	4	20	19	53	−34	22	
14	Chernomorets 2003 Byala	30	6	3	21	25	68	−43	21	
15	Provadia (R)	30	4	1	25	30	109	−79	13	Relegation to Regional Division
16	Dorostol 2003 (R)	30	2	2	26	12	98	−86	8	Relegation to Regional Division

Source: bulgarian-football.com
Rules for classification: 1) points; 2) goal difference; 3) number of goals scored.
(C) Champions; (P) Promoted; (R) Relegated

== South-East V AFG ==
Location of teams in South-East V AFG 2013-14

South-East V AFG
- Season: 2014–15
- Champions: Pomorie
- Relegated: Stara Zagora
- Biggest home win: Dimitrovgrad 8−0 Sliven (15 November 2014)
- Biggest away win: Stara Zagora 2−10 Rozova Dolina (30 November 2014)

Pos	Team	Pld	W	D	L	GF	GA	GD	Pts	Promotion or relegation
1	Pomorie (C, P)	30	23	4	3	66	16	+50	73	Promotion to B Group
2	Gigant Saedinenie	30	18	7	5	63	25	+38	61	
3	Dimitrovgrad	30	17	7	6	51	23	+28	58	
4	Rozova Dolina	30	15	6	9	47	30	+17	51	
5	Eurocollege Plovdiv	30	15	5	10	43	33	+10	50	
6	Minyor Radnevo	30	15	5	10	48	38	+10	50	
7	Zagorets Nova Zagora	30	13	7	10	50	31	+19	46	
8	Asenovets	30	13	7	10	58	35	+23	46	
9	Svilengrad	30	13	6	11	50	39	+11	45	
10	Nesebar	30	12	7	11	47	36	+11	43	
11	Maritsa Plovdiv (Note: On 23 April 2015 Maritsa Plovdiv were deducted 3 points due to their non-attendance of their game against Minyor Radnevo.)	30	12	3	15	38	53	−15	36	
12	Tundzha Yambol (Note: On 5 May 2015 Tundzha Yambol were deducted 3 points due to their non-attendance of their game against Gigant Saedinenie.)	30	9	8	13	34	45	−11	32	
13	Spartak Plovdiv	30	9	5	16	27	49	−22	32	
14	Levski Karlovo	30	7	7	16	23	48	−25	28	
15	Sliven 2000	30	4	3	23	26	95	−69	15	
16	Stara Zagora (Note: FC Stara Zagora decided to cancel their participation in the championship during the winter break due to financial difficulties. All remaining fixtures are awarded 0−3 against them.) (R)	30	1	1	28	17	92	−75	4	Relegation to Regional Division

Source: bulgarian-football.com
Rules for classification: 1) points; 2) goal difference; 3) number of goals scored.
(C) Champions; (P) Promoted; (R) Relegated

== North-West V AFG ==
Location of teams in North-West V AFG 2014-15

North-West V AFG
- Season: 2014–15
- Champions: Spartak Pleven
- Relegated: Vidima-Rakovski; Sitomir Nikopol
- Biggest home win: Spartak Pleven 10−0 Partizan (13 May 2015)
- Biggest away win: Sitomir Nikopol 0−6 Etar Veliko Tarnovo (28 September 2014)

Pos	Team	Pld	W	D	L	GF	GA	GD	Pts	Promotion or relegation
1	Spartak Pleven (C, P)	26	23	2	1	92	8	+84	71	Promotion to B Group
2	Etar Veliko Tarnovo	26	19	5	2	68	19	+49	62	
3	Akademik Svishtov	26	17	3	6	56	19	+37	54	
4	Bdin Vidin	26	17	1	8	61	35	+26	52	
5	Levski	26	14	5	7	43	24	+19	47	
6	Botev Lukovit	26	12	1	13	46	53	−7	37	
7	Yantra Gabrovo	26	9	5	12	43	54	−11	32	
8	Kom Berkovitsa	26	9	3	14	43	64	−21	30	
9	Pavlikeni	26	9	3	14	39	54	−15	30	
10	Juventus Malchika	26	9	3	14	37	56	−19	30	
11	Partizan	26	8	5	13	39	62	−23	29	
12	Vidima-Rakovski (Note: Vidima-Rakovski decided to cancel their participation in the championship during the winter break due to financial difficulties. All remaining fixtures are awarded 0−3 against them.) (R)	26	7	3	16	23	57	−34	24	Relegation to Regional Division
13	Botev Kozloduy	26	5	6	15	31	45	−14	21	
14	Sitomir Nikopol (Note: On 29 March 2015 Sitomir Nikopol decided to cancel their participation in the championship due to financial difficulties. All remaining fixtures are awarded 0−3 against them.) (R)	26	1	1	24	12	83	−71	4	Relegation to Regional Division

Source: bulgarian-football.com
Rules for classification: 1) points; 2) goal difference; 3) number of goals scored.
(C) Champions; (P) Promoted; (R) Relegated

== South-West V AFG ==
Location of teams in South-West V AFG 2014-15

South-West V AFG
- Season: 2014–15
- Champions: Oborishte Panagyurishte
- Relegated: Sportist Svoge; Mesta Hadzhidimovo
- Biggest home win: Oborishte 9−1 Sportist (31 May 2015)

Pos	Team	Pld	W	D	L	GF	GA	GD	Pts	Promotion or relegation
1	Oborishte Panagyurishte (C, P)	30	22	4	4	91	21	+70	70	Promotion to B Group
2	Minyor Pernik	30	20	5	5	56	21	+35	65	
3	Pirin Gotse Delchev	30	18	8	4	53	18	+35	62	
4	Vitosha Bistritsa	30	18	6	6	57	22	+35	60	
5	Slivnishki Geroy Slivnitsa	30	17	7	6	69	38	+31	58	
6	Belasitsa Petrich	30	16	3	11	48	33	+15	51	
7	Strumska slava Radomir	30	12	6	12	38	36	+2	42	
8	Vihren Sandanski	30	11	6	13	37	40	−3	39	
9	Velbazhd Kyustendil	30	11	4	15	38	42	−4	37	
10	Conegliano German	30	11	4	15	46	80	−34	37	
11	Balkan Varvara	30	11	1	18	47	69	−22	34	
12	Germanea Sapareva Banya	30	10	3	17	32	55	−23	33	
13	Chepinets Velingrad	30	9	5	16	35	58	−23	32	
14	Rilski Sportist Samokov	30	7	6	17	26	46	−20	27	
15	Sportist Svoge (R)	30	5	5	20	26	69	−43	20	Relegation to Regional Division
16	Mesta Hadzhidimovo (Note: Mesta Hadzhidimovo were expelled on 21 April 2015 by the zonal management of the BFU due to the disturbances during their game against Rilski Sportist and their subsequent abandonment of the match. All remaining fixtures are awarded 0−3 against them.) (R)	30	4	3	23	15	66	−51	15	Relegation to Regional Division

Source: bulgarian-football.com
Rules for classification: 1) points; 2) goal difference; 3) number of goals scored.
(C) Champions; (P) Promoted; (R) Relegated
