= 2013–14 B Group =

Bulgarian B Group
- Season: 2013–14
- Promoted: Marek; Haskovo
- Relegated: Vitosha; Kaliakra; Dunav; Akademik
- Matches: 182
- Goals: 399 (2.19 per match)
- Top goalscorer: Atanas Chipilov (13 goals)

The 2013–14 B Group was the 58th season of the Bulgarian B Football Group, the second tier of the Bulgarian football league system. The season starts on 3 August 2013 and finished in May 2014.

On 21 June the executive committee of Bulgarian Football Union confirmed that the number of teams for the new season will remain 14. The teams play twice against each other, once home and once away, as it was the previous season. At the end of this season again there are just 2 teams promoted to the top tier of Bulgarian football (A PFG), but since there are 4 teams relegated from the top league so as to reduce the number of teams in it, there will be 4 teams relegated from B PFG at the end of the season as well, in order to keep the number of teams in the division 14.

== Team changes from 2012–13 ==
=== Movement between A PFG and B PFG ===
At the end of season 2012-1013 the first two teams of the second division of Bulgarian football were promoted to the top division (A PFG). These were Neftochimic Burgas and Lyubimets.

Because of the changes made in the number of teams in A PFG for season 2013-2014 the bottom four teams in A Group at the end of season 2012-2013 were relegated to B Group for season 2013–2014. These were Botev Vratsa, Minyor Pernik, Montana and Etar 1924.

=== Movement between B PFG and V AFG ===
During season 2012-2013 OFC Sliven 2000 was suspended due to their inability to field at least 7 players in their senior team and was relegated finishing last in the group. Additionally the other three bottom teams - Vidima-Rakovski Sevlievo, Shumen 2010 and Septemvri Simitli - relegated as of their positions in the group table. However, before the beginning of this season, the teams of Spartak Pleven and Etar 1924 that participated in B PFG in the previous season, did not receive a professional license from the Bulgarian Football Union (BFU) and were relegated to V AFG for the new season.

The four V AFG champions - Botev Galabovo (South-East), Dobrudzha Dobrich (North-East), Marek Dupnitsa (South-West) and Akademik Svishtov (North-West) - were promoted to B PFG because of their standings in their places in their respective groups the previous season. Nevertheless, at that time, B Group was two participants short of its 16-team quota because of the teams that did not receive license to play professional football in Bulgaria.

Moreover, after the end of season 2012–2013, on 30 July, Svetkavitsa Targovishte sent an official letter to the Bulgarian Football Union, announcing it will not take part in the 2013–2014 B PFG season. On the next day a similar decision was taken by Chavdar Etropole. Both teams were experiencing financial difficulties at that time. Further, the football union was still awaiting word from Minyor Pernik on whether they will be able to participate in the group, because of speculations in the media of their inability to cover their financial costs for B PFG for the whole season.

On a special meeting on 1 August 2013 BFU approved the filed decisions by Svetkavitsa Targovishte and Chavdar Etropole, and gave final notice to Minyor Pernik to sign the required 7 players at least. The same day the leadership of Minyor Pernik declared that they will abolish the current club and intend to found a new one, which will take a license to participate in the third division (V AFG) of the Bulgarian football system. The BFU confirmed the exclusion of Minyor the next day.

On 3 August the season started awaiting a decision of the BFU with some games postponed and fewer than intended participants.

On 6 August, the Bulgarian Football Union announced its decision to replace the 3 teams (Svetkavitsa, Chavdar, and Minyor) with 3 of the second placed teams in the 2012-13 V AFGs. Since FC Botev Kozloduy, the second placed team in last season's North-West V AFG declined to participate in the professional B PFG, the places were automatically delegated to the second placed clubs from the other three regional divisions - FC Dunav Ruse (North-East), FC Haskovo (South-East) and FC Vitosha Bistritsa (South-West). Dunav Ruse would take the schedule of Svetkavitsa Targovishte, Haskovo would take the schedule of Chavdar Etropole, while Vitosha would take the one meant for Minyor Pernik. The three postponed games of those teams from the first round would be played during the break for the UEFA qualifications for the World Cup in Brazil 2014, between September 6 and September 10.

For season 2013-2014 B Group would have only 14 participants.

== Stadia and locations ==
Location of teams in B PFG 2013-14

Team	City	Stadium	Capacity
Akademik	Svishtov	Akademik	13,500
Bansko	Bansko	Saint Peter	3,000
Botev	Galabovo	Energetik	3,000
Botev	Vratsa	Hristo Botev	32,000
Dobrudzha	Dobrich	Druzhba	12,500
Dunav	Ruse	Gradski	19,960
Haskovo	Haskovo	Haskovo	7,500
Kaliakra	Kavarna	Kavarna	5,000
Marek	Dupnitsa	Bonchuk	16,050
Montana	Montana	Ogosta	8,000
Pirin	Razlog	Pirin	2,000
Rakovski	Rakovski	Legia	3,000
Spartak	Varna	Spartak	13,000
Vitosha	Bistritsa	Bistritsa	2,000

== League table ==
Pos	Team	Pld	W	D	L	GF	GA	GD	Pts	Promotion or relegation
1	Marek (C, P)	26	16	6	4	40	17	+23	54	Promotion to 2014–15 A Group
2	Haskovo (P)	26	14	4	8	35	20	+15	46 (Note: HAS 1−0 DOB; DOB 1−0 HAS)	Promotion to 2014–15 A Group
3	Dobrudzha Dobrich	26	12	10	4	33	20	+13	46	
4	Montana	26	12	8	6	36	24	+12	44	
5	Bansko	26	13	3	10	40	24	+16	42	
6	Botev Vratsa	26	10	8	8	32	23	+9	38	
7	Pirin Razlog	26	9	9	8	30	43	−13	36	
8	Spartak Varna	26	9	7	10	24	29	−5	34	
9	Rakovski 2011	26	8	8	10	28	35	−7	32	
10	Botev Galabovo	26	7	7	12	19	30	−11	28 (Note: GAL 7p; VIT 6p; KAV 4p)	
11	Vitosha Bistritsa (R)	26	7	7	12	21	23	−2	28	Relegation to 2014–15 V Group
12	Kaliakra (R)	26	8	4	14	23	34	−11	28	Relegation to 2014–15 V Group
13	Dunav Ruse (R)	26	6	9	11	24	32	−8	27	Relegation to 2014–15 V Group
14	Akademik Svishtov (R)	26	3	6	17	12	43	−31	15	Relegation to 2014–15 V Group

Source: Soccerway
Rules for classification: 1st points; 2nd head-to-head points; 3rd head-to-head goal difference; 4th head-to-head goals scored; 5th goal difference; 6th number of goals scored; 7th Fair-play points; 8th Draw
(C) Champions; (P) Promoted; (R) Relegated

== Results ==
Home \ Away	SVI	BAN	GAL	BVR	DOB	DUN	HAS	KAV	MAR	MON	PRZ	RAK	SPV	VIT
Akademik Svishtov		0–2	1–0	0–3	0–1	1–1	0–2	2–1	0–2	1–1	2–2	0–2	0–3	0–1
Bansko	0–0		1–0	3–0	2–3	3–0	0–2	2–0	1–2	1–2	2–3	1–2	4–0	0–3
Botev Galabovo	1–3	1–4		1–0	0–1	1–0	2–1	0–0	1–0	1–2	1–1	3–0	0–0	2–0
Botev Vratsa	1–0	0–2	5–1		1–1	3–0	1–0	2–2	1–1	0–0	3–0	2–0	0–1	2–1
Dobrudzha Dobrich	1–0	0–2	1–1	0–0		1–1	1–0	0–2	1–1	1–0	4–0	2–2	1–0	2–0
Dunav Ruse	1–0	0–2	1–0	3–2	1–3		0–0	3–1	1–1	1–2	1–2	1–1	2–0	2–0
Haskovo	3–0	1–4	0–0	1–0	1–0	2–1		2–0	2–1	1–1	3–0	4–0	0–1	1–0
Kaliakra	1–0	1–1	3–0	0–0	0–1	2–1	0–2		0–2	2–1	2–0	0–1	0–2	0–1
Marek	1–0	1–0	2–0	2–1	0–0	1–0	2–1	4–1		3–0	3–1	1–2	3–0	1–0
Montana	4–1	1–0	0–0	0–0	2–2	0–0	1–0	4–1	3–1		3–0	3–0	0–1	1–3
Pirin Razlog	0–0	2–1	1–1	2–1	2–2	3–2	3–0	1–0	0–0	2–2		0–0	1–1	3–1
Rakovski 2011	3–0	0–1	1–0	1–1	0–3	1–1	2–3	1–2	0–3	1–0	5–0		1–1	0–1
Spartak Varna	1–1	0–1	2–1	0–1	1–0	0–0	0–3	0–2	1–2	1–2	3–0	2–2		2–1
Vitosha Bistritsa	5–0	0–0	0–1	1–2	1–1	0–0	0–0	1–0	0–0	0–1	0–1	0–0	1–1	

Source: Soccerway
Legend: Blue = home team win; Yellow = draw; Red = away team win.

== Season statistics ==
=== Top scorers ===
As of 3 May 2014

Rank	Scorer	Club	Goals
1	(Bulgaria) Atanas Chipilov	Bansko	13
2	(Bulgaria) Dimitar Dimitrov	Pirin Razlog	9
3	(Bulgaria) Ventsislav Ivanov	Montana	8
4	(Bulgaria) Sergey Georgiev	Bansko	7
4	(Bulgaria) Nedyalko Hubenov	Haskovo	7
4	(Bulgaria) Blagoy Nakov	Montana	7
7	(Bulgaria) Dimitar Aleksiev	Haskovo	6
7	(Bulgaria) Emil Angelov	Haskovo	6
7	(Bulgaria) Deyan Hristov	Spartak Varna	6
7	(Bulgaria) Chetin Sadula	Vitosha Bistritsa	6
7	(Bulgaria) Lyuboslav Voynov	Bansko	4
