= 2013–14 V AFG =

Bulgarian V Football Group
- Season: 2013–14

The 2013–14 V Football Group season was the 64th season of the Bulgarian V Group. The group comprises the third level of the Bulgarian football pyramid and is divided into four geographic regions: North-West, North-East, South-East, and South-West.

The top team from each region was directly promoted to the B Group for season 2014–15. The bottom two teams of each division were relegated to their respective regional groups at the fourth level of the football league system for the following season.

== Changes from season 2012–13 ==
=== Club Movements Between V Group and B Group ===
The champions of the four 2012–13 V AFG divisions were promoted to the 2013–14 B PFG: Dobrudzha Dobrich from V AFG North-East and Botev Galabovo from V AFG South-East, Akademik Svishtov from V AFG North-West and Marek 2010 Dupnitsa from V AFG South-West.

In return, Sliven 2000 was expelled from the B PFG championship in March 2013. Other teams, which relegated to V AFG, are Shumen 2010, Septemvri Simitli and Vidima-Rakovski.

=== Club Movements Between the V Group and the Regional Groups ===
- North-East: Ariston Ruse, Devnya and Lokomotiv 2008 Kaspichan relegated last season to regional divisions. In July 2013 Kosmos Branichevo was relocated to Shumen and renamed to Shumen 1929. In August 2013 Agroelit Makariopolsko merged with Svetkavitsa. The new teams, coming from the regional divisions, are Botev Novi Pazar, Ticha 1948 Dolni Chiflik, Svetkavitsa and Shumen 1929.
- North-West: Balkan Belogradchik and Lokomotiv 1929 Mezdra relegated from last season to the regional divisions. Before the start of the new season Dunav Selanovtsi and Chavdar Troyan withdrew from participation. On 17 July 2013 Botev Debelets was relocated to Veliko Tarnovo and renamed, the new team is called OFC Etar. In August Storgoziya Pleven merged with Spartak Pleven. The new teams, coming from the regional divisions, are Botev Lukovit, OFC Etar, Lokomotiv 2012 Mezdra, Spartak Pleven, Bdin, Yantra Gabrovo, Kom Berkovitsa and Pavlikeni.
- South-East: Hebros Harmanli and Arda Kardzhali relegated from last season to the regional divisions. The new teams, coming from the regional divisions, are Minyor Radnevo, FC Eurocollege and Straldzha.
- South-West: Rilski Sportist Samokov and Minyor Bobov Dol relegated from last season to regional divisions. In August 2013 Vitosha Dolna Dikanya was relocated to Pernik and renamed to Minyor Pernik. Before the start of the season Septemvri Simitli decided to withdraw from participation. The new teams, coming from the regional divisions, are Perun Kresna, Minyor Pernik, Vihren Sandanski, Balkan Varvara, Belasitsa Petrich and Sportist Svoge.

== North-East V AFG ==
Location of teams in North-East V AFG 2013-14

North-East V AFG
- Season: 2013–14
- Champions: Benkovski Byala
- Relegated: Silistra 2009; Shumen 2010; Veliki Preslav
- Top goalscorer: Martin Hristov (24 goals)
- Biggest home win: Ticha 14−0 Veliki Preslav (13 April 2014)
- Biggest away win: Veliki Preslav 0−8 Belitsa (18 May 2014)

Pos	Team	Pld	W	D	L	GF	GA	GD	Pts	Relegation
1	Benkovski Byala (C)	30	24	3	3	91	20	+71	75	
2	Svetkavitsa Targovishte	30	22	6	2	77	11	+66	72	
3	Septemvri Tervel	30	22	2	6	77	20	+57	68	
4	Kubrat	30	20	4	6	74	15	+59	64	
5	Suvorovo	30	18	4	8	63	34	+29	58	
6	Ticha 1948 Dolni Chiflik	30	18	3	9	81	22	+59	57	
7	Belitsa	30	16	4	10	56	29	+27	52	
8	Chernomorets 2003 Byala	30	14	4	12	40	29	+11	46	
9	Dve Mogili	30	9	6	15	47	53	−6	33	
10	Provadia	30	9	5	16	29	70	−41	32	
11	Botev Novi Pazar	30	10	2	18	40	65	−25	32	
12	Shumen 1929	30	9	3	18	33	66	−33	30	
13	Chernomorets Balchik	30	8	2	20	39	63	−24	26	
14	Silistra 2009 (Note: Silistra 2009 was expelled from the league on 18 March 2014 for not attending two consecutive games. All remaining fixtures are awarded 0:3 against them.) (R)	30	6	7	17	25	53	−28	25	Relegation to Regional Division
15	Shumen 2010 (R)	30	5	0	25	41	95	−54	15	Relegation to Regional Division
16	Veliki Preslav (R)	30	2	1	27	18	186	−168	7	Relegation to Regional Division

Source: Sportal.BG
Rules for classification: 1) points; 2) goal difference; 3) number of goals scored.
(C) Champions; (R) Relegated

== South-East V AFG ==
Location of teams in South-East V AFG 2013-14

South-East V AFG
- Season: 2013–14
- Champions: Sozopol
- Promoted: Sozopol; Master Burgas; Vereya Stara Zagora
- Relegated: Straldzha; Brestnik
- Top goalscorer: Zahari Dimitrov (25 goals)
- Biggest home win: Vereya Stara Zagora 10−0 Sliven 2000 (30 November 2013)
- Biggest away win: Sliven 2000 0−8 Master Burgas (5 April 2014)
- Highest scoring: Sozopol 10−2 Sliven 2000 (25 August 2013)

Pos	Team	Pld	W	D	L	GF	GA	GD	Pts	Promotion or relegation
1	Sozopol (C, P)	32	26	3	3	104	25	+79	81	Promotion to B Group
2	Master Burgas	32	26	2	4	92	21	+71	80	Promotion to B Group
3	Vereya Stara Zagora	32	24	3	5	102	25	+77	75	Promotion to B Group
4	Spartak Plovdiv	32	19	7	6	61	25	+36	64	
5	Nesebar	32	19	5	8	75	40	+35	62	
6	Asenovets	32	17	9	6	65	35	+30	60	
7	Gigant Saedinenie	32	16	7	9	56	33	+23	55	
8	Minyor Radnevo	32	15	4	13	55	52	+3	49	
9	FC Eurocollege	32	12	6	14	44	46	−2	42	
10	Svilengrad	32	12	4	16	51	52	−1	40	
11	Zagorets Nova Zagora	32	10	7	15	36	55	−19	37	
12	Rozova Dolina	32	9	5	18	42	51	−9	32	
13	Dimitrovgrad	32	9	5	18	45	50	−5	32	
14	Levski Karlovo	32	7	4	21	38	85	−47	25	
15	Tundzha Yambol	32	7	3	22	19	74	−55	24	
16	Sliven 2000	32	4	0	28	33	165	−132	12	
17	Straldzha (R)	32	2	2	28	24	108	−84	8	Relegation to Regional Division
−	Brestnik (Note: Brestnik resigned from participation in the league after round 2, all fixtures were annulled and every opponent will rest if it is the case (according to schedule) that they should play against them.) (R)	2	0	0	2	0	6	−6	0	Relegation to Regional Division

Source: Sportal.BG
Rules for classification: 1) points; 2) goal difference; 3) number of goals scored.
(C) Champions; (P) Promoted; (R) Relegated

== North-West V AFG ==
Location of teams in North-West V AFG 2013-14

North-West V AFG
- Season: 2013–14
- Champions: Lokomotiv 2012 Mezdra
- Promoted: Lokomotiv 2012 Mezdra; Lokomotiv Gorna Oryahovitsa
- Relegated: Gigant Belene and Tryavna
- Top goalscorer: Tihomir Kanev (41 goals)
- Biggest home win: Bdin 11−0 Tryavna (15 September 2013)
- Biggest away win: Yantra Gabrovo 0-8 FC Lokomotiv Gorna Oryahovitsa (3 November 2013)

Pos	Team	Pld	W	D	L	GF	GA	GD	Pts	Promotion or relegation
1	Lokomotiv 2012 Mezdra (C, P)	30	23	5	2	91	24	+67	74	Promotion to B Group
2	Lokomotiv Gorna Oryahovitsa (P)	30	23	4	3	119	26	+93	73	Promotion to B Group
3	Botev Lukovit	30	23	2	5	61	27	+34	71	
4	Spartak Pleven	30	20	5	5	66	27	+39	65	
5	Etar	30	19	5	6	61	20	+41	62	
6	Partizan	30	12	8	10	40	48	−8	44	
7	Vidima-Rakovski	30	13	2	15	56	44	+12	41	
8	Bdin	30	12	5	13	48	47	+1	41	
9	Botev Kozloduy	30	9	9	12	45	50	−5	36	
10	Sitomir Nikopol	30	7	7	16	35	62	−27	28	
11	Levski	30	7	7	16	34	62	−28	28	
12	Kom Berkovitsa	30	6	6	18	39	62	−23	24	
13	Pavlikeni	30	7	3	20	30	81	−51	24	
14	Yantra Gabrovo	30	6	6	18	22	76	−54	24	
15	Gigant Belene (Note: On 20 May 2014 Gigant Belene received 3 point deduction because the team did attend their game against Bdin Vidin. On 27 May they received another 3 point deduction, because their youth team suspended its games on two occasions for remaining with less than 6 players on the field. All remaining fixtures are awarded 0:3 against them.) (R)	30	7	5	18	25	54	−29	20	Relegation to Regional Division
16	Tryavna (R)	30	3	7	20	19	81	−62	16	Relegation to Regional Division

Source: Sportal.BG
Rules for classification: 1) points; 2) goal difference; 3) number of goals scored.
(C) Champions; (P) Promoted; (R) Relegated

== South-West V AFG ==
Location of teams in South-West V AFG 2013-14

South-West V AFG
- Season: 2013–14
- Champions: Pirin Blagoevgrad
- Promoted: Pirin Blagoevgrad
- Relegated: Botev Ihtiman; Septemvri Sofia
- Top goalscorer: Vladislav Zlatinov (30 goals)
- Biggest home win: Pirin Blagoevgrad 13−0 Sportist Svoge (6 April 2014)
- Biggest away win: Sportist Svoge 1−6 Vihren Sandanski (30 March 2014)

Pos	Team	Pld	W	D	L	GF	GA	GD	Pts	Promotion or relegation
1	Pirin Blagoevgrad (C, P)	30	25	4	1	87	6	+81	79	Promotion to B Group
2	Perun Kresna (P)	30	21	7	2	47	15	+32	70	Promotion to B Group
3	Oborishte Panagyurishte	30	22	2	6	63	26	+37	68	
4	Minyor Pernik	30	19	4	7	63	19	+44	61	
5	Slivnishki Geroy	30	18	6	6	56	25	+31	60	
6	Vihren Sandanski	30	13	1	16	37	34	+3	40	
7	Chepinets Velingrad	30	11	5	14	36	52	−16	38	
8	Balkan Varvara	30	11	4	15	34	36	−2	37	
9	Belasitsa Petrich	30	11	4	15	32	37	−5	37	
10	Strumska slava	30	10	5	15	36	36	0	35	
11	Velbazhd Kyustendil	30	10	3	17	38	60	−22	33	
12	Germanea	30	9	5	16	30	40	−10	32	
13	Mesta Hadzhidimovo	30	8	8	14	23	51	−28	32	
14	Sportist Svoge	30	9	3	18	32	60	−28	30	
15	Botev Ihtiman (R)	30	7	7	16	24	47	−23	28	Relegation to Regional Division
16	Septemvri Sofia (Note: On 25 March 2014 Septemvri Sofia received 3 point deduction because the team did attend their game against Belasitsa Petrich. On 1 April 2014 they have deposited their resignation from further participation due financial difficulties. All remaining fixtures are awarded 0:3 against them.) (R)	30	2	0	28	9	93	−84	3	Relegation to Regional Division

Source: Sportal.BG
Rules for classification: 1) points; 2) goal difference; 3) number of goals scored.
(C) Champions; (P) Promoted; (R) Relegated
