= Diyan Moldovanov =

Bulgarian footballer (born 1985)

Personal information
- Full name: Diyan Georgiev Moldovanov
- Date of birth: 2 April 1985 (age 41)
- Place of birth: Silistra, Bulgaria
- Height: 1.83 m (6 ft 0 in)
- Position: Centre-back

Team information
- Current team: Sozopol
- Number: 23

Youth career
- Naftex Burgas

Senior career*
Years	Team	Apps	(Gls)
2005–2009	Naftex Burgas	?	(?)
2009–2010	Pirin Blagoevgrad	28	(1)
2011	Slavia Sofia	13	(0)
2012–2013	Neftochimic 1986	32	(4)
2013	Nesebar	14	(1)
2014	Montana	8	(0)
2014–2015	Lokomotiv Plovdiv	20	(0)
2015–2019	Nesebar	108	(10)
2019–2020	Neftochimic	17	(2)
2020–	Sozopol	85	(15)
- * Club domestic league appearances and goals as of 5 June 2023

Diyan Georgiev Moldovanov (Bulgarian: Диян Георгиев Молдованов; born 2 April 1985) is a Bulgarian footballer who currently plays as a defender for Sozopol.
