= FC Rozova Dolina Kazanlak =

Bulgarian football club

Rozova Dolina
- Full name: Football Club Rozova Dolina
- Nickname: Rozite (The Roses)
- Founded: 1948; 78 years ago
- Ground: Sevtopolis Stadium, Kazanlak
- Capacity: 15,000
- Chairman: Georgi Mermekliev
- Manager: Atanas Apostolov
- League: South-East Third League
- 2023-24: South-East Third League, 9th
- Website: https://rozovadolinakz.com/
Home colours	Away colours

Football Club Rozova Dolina Kazanlak (Bulgarian: Футболен клуб Розова долина Казанлък) or simply known as Rozova Dolina (Bulgarian: Розова Долина) is a Bulgarian association football club based in the town of Kazanlak, Stara Zagora Province, which currently competes in the South-East Third League, the third division of Bulgarian football. Their home ground since 1968 has been the Sevtopolis Stadium. The club's name is translated as Rose Valley and is named after the homonymous Rose Valley region of central Bulgaria, which also encompasses the town of Kazanlak.

== History ==
The club was formed in 1948 as DNA Kazanlak, a football club characterized by its trademark red and white jerseys. In 1982-83, the team played at the top of the Bulgarian football league system, the A Group, but was subsequently relegated after only one season in the top flight, finishing in 15th place. The team did have some memorable moments from its only season in the top level, as Rozova Dolina managed to defeat eventual champions CSKA Sofia at home 2-0 and draw against the runner up Levski Sofia 1-1 also at home.

=== Mermekliev Era: 2016–present ===
On January 15, 2016, following the team's return from the winter break, the club announced that they have reached an agreement with the local Bulgarian businessman Georgi Mermekliev, who would take over at the helm of the club. He subsequently announced his intentions to bring Rozova Dolina's previous glory over the years and that the team will be battling for promotion for the A Group in the very next seasons. He also stated that the club stadium would be renovated and upgraded to 12,000 seats and a new academy would be established. Subsequently, Rozova Dolona announced a sponsorship with a new kit manufacturer, Legea for the upcoming season. Following a great number of investments, on September 14, 2016, Rozova Dolina qualified for the Bulgarian Cup competition after 15 years absence from professional football.

=== Honours ===
- Cup of Bulgarian Amateur Football League:
  - Winners (1): 2020–21

== Shirt and sponsors ==
Rozova Dolina main colors are red, with white away colors.

Period	Kit manufacturer	Shirt partner
1948–2015	Unknown	none
2015–2018	(Italy) Legea	Arsenal
2018–2022	(Germany) Jako	Arsenal
2022–	(Germany) Jako	efbet

== Current squad ==
As of 13 March 2024

Note: Flags indicate national team as defined under FIFA eligibility rules; some limited exceptions apply. Players may hold more than one non-FIFA nationality.

No.	Pos.	Nation	Player
1	GK	BUL	Georgi Stavrev
3	DF	PLE	Jamal Al Badarin
4	DF	BUL	Dimitar Dimitrov
5	DF	BUL	Ivo Ivanov (captain)
6	DF	BUL	Apostol Antonov
7	MF	BUL	Denyo Karshakov
8	MF	BUL	Martin Marinov
9	FW	BUL	Rosen Dimitrov
10	MF	PLE	Monir Al Badarin
11	MF	BUL	Nikolay Georgiev
12	GK	BUL	Georgi Hristov
13	FW	BUL	Ivan Chergev

No.	Pos.	Nation	Player
14	MF	BUL	Kristiyan Georgiev
15	MF	BUL	Ventsislav Ivanov
17	MF	BUL	Mariyan Georgiev
18	FW	BUL	Valentin Hristov
19	MF	BUL	Dian Ovcharov
20	DF	BUL	Atanas Yordanov
23	FW	BUL	Zlatomir Zapryanov
66	DF	BUL	Stoyan Vergilov
77	MF	BUL	Ivaylo Dimitrov
88	MF	BUL	Stanislav Dimitrov
99	DF	BUL	Velislav Todorov

== Notable players ==
The following players included were either playing for their respective national teams or left good impression among the fans.

- (Bulgaria) Todor Yanchev
- (Bulgaria) Hristo Yanev
- (Bulgaria) Anton Spasov
- (Bulgaria) Ivo Ivanov
- (Bulgaria) Vladislav Yamukov
- (Bulgaria) Yordan Filipov
- (Bulgaria) Kancho Yordanov

== Managers ==
Dates	Name	Honours
1948–2007	Unknown	
2007–2008	(Bulgaria) Radko Kalajdzijski	
2008–2010	(Bulgaria) Daniel Hristov	
2010–2014	(Bulgaria) Kralyu Orozov	
2014–2015	(Bulgaria) Angel Stankov	
2015–2017	(Bulgaria) Aleksandar Georgiev	
2017–2018	(Bulgaria) Ivan Petrov	
2018–	(Bulgaria) Atanas Apostolov	

== Past seasons ==
Season	League	Place	W	D	L	GF	GA	Pts	Bulgarian Cup
2009–10	V AFG (III)	13	12	4	20	54	76	40	not qualified
2010–11	V AFG	14	13	6	19	49	58	45	not qualified
2011–12	V AFG	15	8	8	18	38	60	32	not qualified
2012–13	V AFG	13	13	3	18	34	51	42	not qualified
2013–14	V AFG	12	9	5	18	42	51	32	not qualified
2014–15	V AFG	4	15	6	9	47	30	51	not qualified
2015–16	V AFG	2	24	4	6	81	30	76	not qualified
2016–17	Third League	4	20	4	10	69	38	64	First round
2017–18	Third League	4	17	6	11	64	41	57	not qualified
2018-19	Third League	8	14	6	14	58	50	48	not qualified
2019-20	Third League	7	9	3	7	38	30	30	not qualified
Green marks a season followed by promotion, red a season followed by relegation.
