= Zahari Dimitrov =

Bulgarian footballer

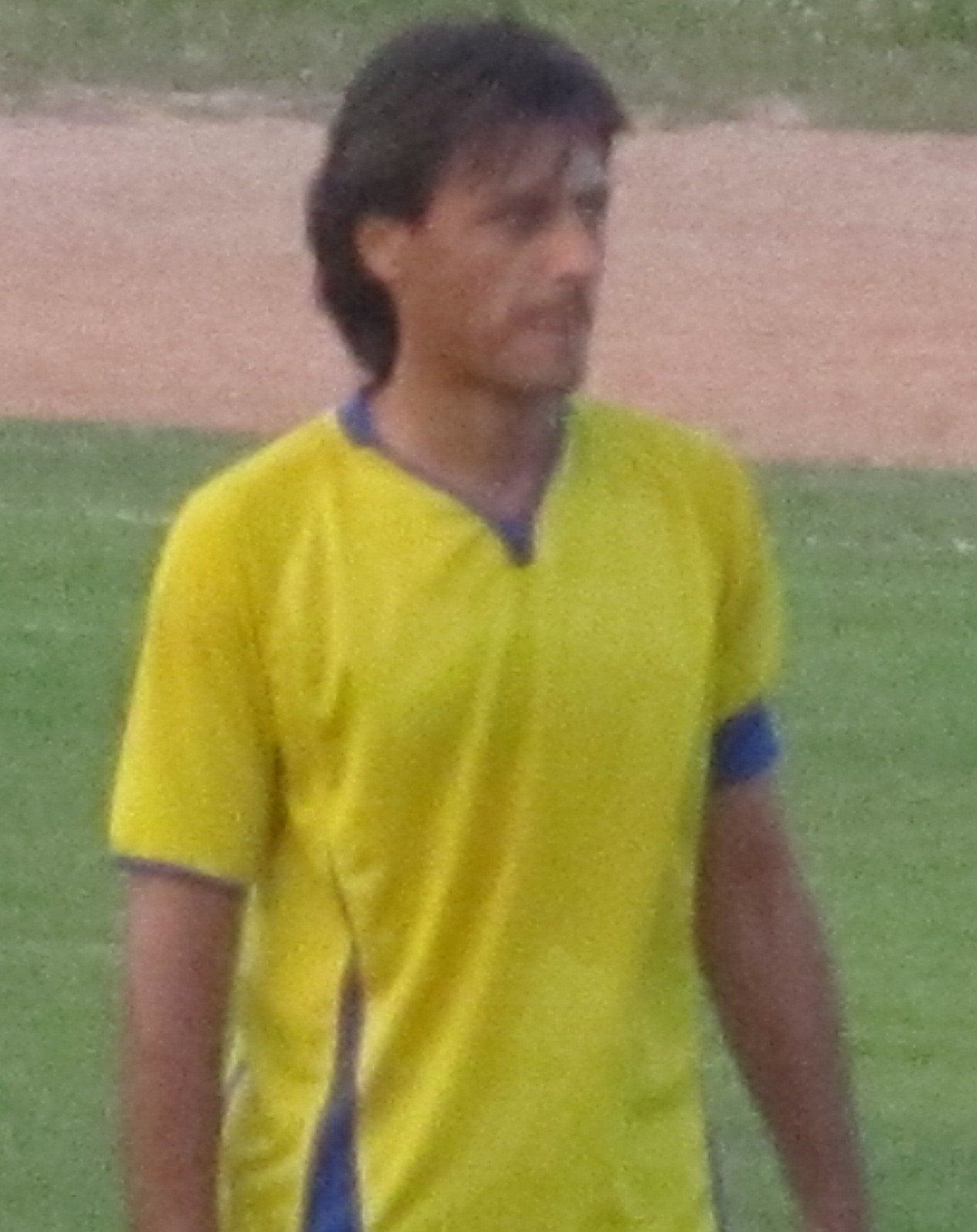

Personal information
- Full name: Zahari Tsonev Dimitrov
- Date of birth: 19 October 1975 (age 51)
- Place of birth: Bulgaria
- Height: 1.87 m (6 ft 1 1/2 in)
- Position: Forward

Senior career*
Years	Team	Apps	(Gls)
1994–1996	FC Preslav	56	(7)
1996–2000	Shumen	86	(8)
2001	Lokomotiv Plovdiv	6	(0)
2001	Svetkavitsa	12	(0)
2002–2004	Shumen	54	(16)
2004	Beroe Stara Zagora	11	(2)
2005	→ Shumen (loan)	15	(10)
2005–2009	Beroe Stara Zagora	40	(16)
2010–2012	Shumen 2010	50	(32)
2013–2014	Vereya	41	(29)
- * Club domestic league appearances and goals as of 1 July 2014

Zahari Dimitrov (Bulgarian: Захари Димитров) (born 19 October 1975) is a Bulgarian footballer who plays as a forward.

== Career ==
Dimitrov had previously played for FC Preslav, PFC Shumen, Lokomotiv Plovdiv and PFC Svetkavitsa. He made his debut in A PFG with Shumen on 8 August 1998 in a match against Spartak Varna.

Dimitrov signed with Beroe Stara Zagora in 2004. After a match of A PFG against Levski Sofia on 9 April 2006, Zahari Dimitrov was tested positive for clenbuterol. He was suspended from all official football competitions for a period of two years by UEFA.

Dimitrov returned to football in 2008–09 season, scoring 8 goals in 19 matches of B PFG. Zahari's goals helped Beroe achieve promotion for the top division. During the winter break of the 2009–10 season, he was released from Beroe and returned to Shumen, staying at the club even after being relegated to the third tier of Bulgarian football due to licensing issues. During the 2011–12 season, Dimitrov was part of the squad that won the Northeastern V Football Group and achieved promotion to the 2012–13 B PFG, returning the club to professional football after a two-year absence. He then signed a contract with Vereya, eventually becoming the captain of the team and winning the 20th edition of the Amateur Cup with it.
