= Cup of Bulgarian Amateur Football League =

Cup of the Bulgarian Amateur Football League
- Купа на Аматьорската Футболна Λига
- Organiser(s): Bulgarian Football Union
- Founded: 1994; 32 years ago
- Region: Europe (UEFA)
- Teams: V AFG teams + 4 zonal 4th div. winners
- Current champions: Botev Ihtiman (1st title)
- Most championships: Dunav Ruse (2 titles); Pomorie (2 titles); Vitosha Bistritsa (2 titles)
- Broadcaster: None
- Website: http://bfunion.bg/en/

The Cup of the Bulgarian Amateur Football League (Bulgarian: Купа на Аматьорската Футболна Лига) is a Bulgarian annual football competition established by the BFU in 1994.

== Structure ==
All officially registered amateur football clubs in the country can participate. The tournament is held in three stages: regional qualifiers in September and October, play-offs involving regional leaders between November and March, and semi-finals and final in April and May. The matches from the final four stage of the competition are played on a neutral ground.

== Winners ==
Locations of all AFL Cup winners (1995-2012)

Year	Winner	Result	Opponent	Venue	Attendance
1995	Septemvri Simitli				
1996	Loviko Suhindol				
1997	Kremikovtsi				
1998	Rodopa Smolyan		Kaliakra Kavarna	Ovcha Kupel Stadium, Sofia	
1999	Vidima-Rakovski	4-3	Rozova Dolina Kazanlak		
2000	Fairplay Varna	0-0 (5-4 p)	Sokol Markovo	Ovcha Kupel Stadium, Sofia	1,000
2001	Siera Dimitrovgrad	2-0	Fairplay Varna	Ovcha Kupel Stadium, Sofia	
2002	Yantra Gabrovo	2-0	Rodopa Smolyan	Ovcha Kupel Stadium, Sofia	175
2003	Pomorie	1-0	Bdin Vidin	Ovcha Kupel Stadium, Sofia	
2004	Dunav Ruse	1-0	Sliven 2000	Lokomotiv Stadium, Sofia	500
2005	Haskovo	1-1 (5-4 p)	Minyor Pernik	Lokomotiv Stadium, Sofia	1,000
2006	Chernomorets Burgas	4-1	Kostinbrod	Vasil Levski National Stadium, Sofia	
2007	Malesh Mikrevo	3-1	Benkovski Byala	Hadzhi Dimitar Stadium, Sliven	350
2008	Kom-Minyor	2-1	Chernomorets Nesebar	Todor Diev Stadium, Plovdiv	
2009	Pomorie	4-1	Benkovski Byala	Ticha Stadium, Varna	250
2010	Ravda 1954	1-0	Dve Mogili	Hadzhi Dimitar Stadium, Sliven	
2011	Neftochimic Burgas	2-2 (5-4 p)	Spartak Varna	Hadzhi Dimitar Stadium, Sliven	500
2012	Vitosha Bistritsa	2-1	Dve Mogili	Vasil Levski National Stadium, Sofia	280
2013	Lokomotiv Mezdra	1-1 (6-5 p)	Orlovetz Pobeda	Akademik Stadium, Sofia	
2014	Vereya Stara Zagora	2-0	Minyor Pernik	Botev 1912 Football Complex, Komatevo	680
2015	Dunav Ruse	4-2	Slivnishki Geroy	Ivaylo Stadium, Veliko Tarnovo	380
2016	Nesebar	2-0	Chernomorets Balchik	Ivaylo Stadium, Veliko Tarnovo	250
2017	Chernomorets Balchik	3-0	CSKA 1948	Trace Arena, Stara Zagora	350
2018	Arda Kardzhali	1-1 (5-4 p)	Kariana Erden	Ivaylo Stadium, Veliko Tarnovo	450
2019	Balkan Botevgrad	3-1	Suvorovo	Ivaylo Stadium, Veliko Tarnovo	300
2020	Zagorets Nova Zagora		Chernomorets Balchik	Ivaylo Stadium, Veliko Tarnovo	
2021	Rozova Dolina Kazanlak	3-2	Marek Dupnitsa	Stadion Georgi Benkovski, Pazardzhik	700
2022	Vitosha Bistritsa	1-0	Dunav Ruse	Ivaylo Stadium, Veliko Tarnovo	
2023	Lokomotiv G.O.	2-0	Sayana Haskovo	Stadion Bistritsa, Bistritsa	350
2024	Fratria	2-0	Akademik Svishtov	Ivaylo Stadium, Veliko Tarnovo	500
2025	Yambol	2-2 (4-3 p)	Chernomorets Balchik	Stadion Nesebar, Nesebar	
2026	Botev Ihtiman	4-1	Maritsa Milevo	Stadion Georgi Benkovski, Pazardzhik	

=== Multiple finalists ===
Club	Winners	Runners-up	Year(s) Won	Year(s) Lost
Dunav Ruse	2	1	2004, 2015	2022
Pomorie	2	0	2003, 2009	
Vitosha Bistritsa	2	0	2012, 2022	
Chernomorets Balchik	1	3	2017	2016, 2020, 2025
Fairplay Varna	1	1	2000	2001
Rodopa Smolyan	1	1	1998	2002
Rozova Dolina	1	1	2021	1999
Benkovski Byala	0	2		2007, 2009
Dve Mogili	0	2		2010, 2012
Minyor Pernik	0	2		2005, 2014

=== Winners by region ===
Region	Winners	Runners-up	Total finals	Last winning year	Last losing year
South-East	14	7	21	2025	2026
South-West	7	6	13	2026	2021
North-West	6	3	9	2023	2024
North-East	5	13	18	2024	2025

Region (Wins)	1994–95	1995–96	1996–97	1997–98	1998–99	1999–00	2000–01	2001–02	2002–03	2003–04	2004–05	2005–06	2006–07	2007–08	2008–09	2009–10	2010–11	2011–12	2012–13	2013–14	2014–15	2015–16	2016–17	2017–18	2018–19	2019–20	2020–21	2021–22	2022–23	2023–24	2024–25	2025–26
SE (14)				W	F	F	W	F	W	F	W	W		F	W	W	W			W		W		W		W	W		F		W	F
SW (7)	W		W								F	F	W					W		F	F		F		W		F	W				W
NW (6)		W			W			W	F					W					W					F					W	F		
NE (5)				F		W	F			W			F		F	F	F	F	F		W	F	W		F	F		F		W	F	
Region	1994–95	1995–96	1996–97	1997–98	1998–99	1999–00	2000–01	2001–02	2002–03	2003–04	2004–05	2005–06	2006–07	2007–08	2008–09	2009–10	2010–11	2011–12	2012–13	2013–14	2014–15	2015–16	2016–17	2017–18	2018–19	2019–20	2020–21	2021–22	2022–23	2023–24	2024–25	2025–26
