= Yavor Ivanov =

Yavor Ivanov can refer toL

- Yavor Ivanov (figure skater) (born 1964), Bulgarian figure skater
- Yavor Ivanov (footballer) (born 1991), Bulgarian footballer
