= 2012–13 V AFG =

Bulgarian V AFG
- Season: 2012–13

The 2012–13 V AFG season was the 63rd season of the Bulgarian V AFG, the third tier of the Bulgarian football league system. The winners of each of the four regional groups progressed to the 2013–14 B PFG and up to four teams from each group were relegated to regional amateur championships.

== Changes from the 2011–12 season ==
=== Movement between B PFG and V AFG ===
The champions of the four 2011–12 V AFG divisions were promoted to the 2012–13 B PFG: Shumen 2010 from V AFG North-East and Rakovski 2011 from V AFG South-East, Spartak 1919 Pleven from V AFG North-West and Pirin Razlog from V AFG South-West. This season the B Grupa will be consisting of one division, so all third division champions will play against each other.

In return, Dorostol Silistra canceled their participation during the East B PFG championship and dissolved as club. Dobrudzha Dobrich and Nesebar finished at the bottom two places and relegated to the North-East and South-East division. Additionally Chernomorets Pomorie canceled their East B PFG participation after the end of the last season and dissolved as club.

From West B PFG relegated also four teams - Chavdar Byala Slatina canceled its participation during the season and dissolved as club, Slivnishki Geroi will play in the South-West V AFG, Malesh Mikrevo declined its further participation in the third division and Akademik Sofia have not received a professional licence, but due financial difficulties they canceled its participation in the South-West V AFG.

=== Movement from V Group to fourth-level leagues ===
- North-East: The teams of Rapid Divdyadovo merging mid-season with Shumen 2010 and Botev Novi Pazar resigning form the championship in different stages during winter break. Additionally Chernolomets Popovo decided not to participate in the new season. The new teams coming from the regional divisions are Kubrat, Ariston Ruse, Provadia and Silistra 2009.
- South-East: The group was left from Tundzha Yagoda and Rodopa Smolyan due to financial difficulties and Sportist Roza and Chirpan relegated after they finished at the bottom two places. The new teams are Haskovo 2009 and Vereya Stara Zagora.
- North-West: The group was joined only by Chavdar Troyan. This division was reduced after the relegation of Lokomotiv Dryanovo and dissolution of Yantra Gabrovo and Botev Krivodol.
- South-West: The new team is the newly founded Perun Kresna, since the old club renamed itself to OFC Pirin Blagoevgrad. Balkan Botevgrad relegated after only two games, Hebar Pazardzhik got nine points deduction which led to its relegation and OFC Hebar Pazardzhik could not afford its further participation. Levski Elin Pelin were also relegated. OFC Kostinbrod renamed itself to Botev Ihtiman, since the club united with the team from Ihtiman. Strumska slava Radomir should have relegated, but the team of Belaistsa Petrich could not afford further participation, thus Radomir avoided relegation.

== Eastern divisions ==
=== North-East V AFG ===
Location of teams in North-East V AFG 2012-13

Pos	Team	Pld	W	D	L	GF	GA	GD	Pts	Promotion or relegation
1	Dobrudzha Dobrich (C, P)	28	25	3	0	82	8	+74	78	Promotion to B Group
2	Dunav 2010 Ruse	28	24	2	2	86	15	+71	74	
3	Belitsa	28	16	3	9	57	32	+25	51	
4	Kubrat	28	14	8	6	38	19	+19	50	
5	Suvorovo	28	15	5	8	48	35	+13	50	
6	Septemvri Tervel	28	12	6	10	39	33	+6	42	
7	Chernomorets Balchik	28	11	8	9	37	31	+6	41	
8	Benkovski Byala	28	11	6	11	37	46	−9	39	
9	Dve Mogili	28	11	2	15	33	58	−25	35	
10	Silistra 2009	28	9	6	13	32	31	+1	33	
11	Chernomorets 2003 Byala	28	8	7	13	28	36	−8	31	
12	Veliki Preslav	28	6	6	16	37	76	−39	24	
13	Provadia	28	6	2	20	24	57	−33	20	
14	Ariston Ruse (Note: Ariston Ruse resigned from participation in the league during the winter break. All remaining fixtures are awarded 0:3 against them.) (R)	27	4	5	18	22	52	−30	17	Relegation to Regional Division
15	Devnya (Note: Devnya resigned from participation in the league during the winter break. All remaining fixtures are awarded 0–3 against them.) (R)	27	2	1	24	5	76	−71	7	Relegation to Regional Division
–	Lokomotiv 2008 Kaspichan (Note: Lokomotiv 2008 Kaspichan resigned from participation in the league after round 6, all fixtures were annulled and every opponent will rest if it is the case (according to schedule) that they should play against them.) (R)	6	0	0	6	6	20	−14	0	Relegation to Regional Division

Source: Soccerway
Rules for classification: 1) points; 2) goal difference; 3) number of goals scored.
(C) Champions; (P) Promoted; (R) Relegated

=== South-East V AFG ===
Location of teams in North-East V AFG 2012-13

Pos	Team	Pld	W	D	L	GF	GA	GD	Pts	Promotion or relegation
1	Botev Galabovo (C, P)	34	22	7	5	56	17	+39	73	Promotion to B Group
2	Haskovo 2009	34	20	9	5	62	25	+37	69	
3	Master Burgas	34	19	10	5	53	25	+28	67	
4	Svilengrad	34	20	3	11	62	34	+28	63	
5	Vereya Stara Zagora	34	17	9	8	47	29	+18	60	
6	Nesebar	34	18	4	12	58	31	+27	58	
7	Asenovets	34	16	7	11	58	45	+13	55	
8	Spartak Plovdiv	34	16	4	14	45	37	+8	52	
9	Sozopol	34	15	6	13	51	32	+19	51	
10	Tundzha Yambol	34	16	2	16	60	56	+4	50	
11	Levski Karlovo	34	14	8	12	52	53	−1	50	
12	Gigant Saedinenie	34	12	9	13	42	39	+3	45	
13	Rozova Dolina	34	13	3	18	34	51	−17	42	
14	Dimitrovgrad	34	11	8	15	36	47	−11	41	
15	Zagorets Nova Zagora	34	10	8	16	30	41	−11	38	
16	Brestnik	34	8	3	23	35	92	−57	27	
17	Hebros Harmanli (Note: Hebros Harmanli decided to exit from participation in the league on 14 May after round 30 due to lack of financial funding. All remaining fixtures are awarded 0:3 against them.) (R)	34	5	1	28	20	76	−56	16	Relegation to Regional Division
18	Arda Kardzhali (Note: Arda Kardzhali were excluded from participation in the league on 9 April after round 24, because for second time during the season they have not showed up for their fixiture. All remaining fixtures are awarded 0:3 against them.) (R)	34	2	3	29	10	81	−71	6	Relegation to Regional Division

Source: Soccerway
Rules for classification: 1) points; 2) goal difference; 3) number of goals scored.
(C) Champions; (P) Promoted; (R) Relegated

== Western divisions ==
=== North-West V AFG ===
Location of teams in North-West V AFG 2012-13

Pos	Team	Pld	W	D	L	GF	GA	GD	Pts	Promotion or relegation
1	Akademik Svishtov (C, P)	22	16	2	4	61	14	+47	50	Promotion to B Group
2	Botev Kozloduy	22	15	4	3	46	15	+31	49	
3	Cherven Bryag	22	14	1	7	56	28	+28	43	
4	Dunav Selanovtsi	22	12	4	6	39	25	+14	40	
5	Lokomotiv 1929 Mezdra (Note: Lokomotiv Mezdra were excluded from V Grupa on 29 March due to a FIFA decision in favor of the former Mezdra player Damian Rączka for unpaid salary. All remaining fixtures are awarded 0:3 against them.) (R)	22	11	1	10	42	38	+4	34	Relegation to Regional Division
6	Levski	22	9	4	9	34	32	+2	31	
7	Lokomotiv Gorna Oryahovitsa	22	9	4	9	40	26	+14	31	
8	Gigant Belene	22	9	2	11	30	27	+3	29	
9	Sitomir Nikopol	22	7	6	9	29	37	−8	27	
10	Chavdar Troyan	22	5	4	13	25	70	−45	19	
11	Tryavna	22	3	3	16	17	61	−44	12	
12	Balkan Belogradchik (R)	22	1	7	14	19	65	−46	10	Relegation to Regional Division

Source: Soccerway
Rules for classification: 1) points; 2) goal difference; 3) number of goals scored.
(C) Champions; (P) Promoted; (R) Relegated

=== South-West V AFG ===
Location of teams in South-West V AFG 2012-13

Pos	Team	Pld	W	D	L	GF	GA	GD	Pts	Promotion or relegation
1	Marek 2010 Dupnitsa (C, P)	30	22	6	2	70	13	+57	72	Promotion to B Group
2	Vitosha Bistritsa	30	22	5	3	52	10	+42	71	
3	OFC Pirin Blagoevgrad	30	19	5	6	69	26	+43	62	
4	Slivnishki Geroy Slivnitsa	30	16	9	5	44	18	+26	57	
5	Oborishte Panagyurishte	30	16	6	8	49	30	+19	54	
6	Strumska slava	30	14	7	9	41	26	+15	49	
7	Perun Kresna	30	12	5	13	36	37	−1	41	
8	Velbazhd Kyustendil	30	11	7	12	29	32	−3	40	
9	Germanea	30	12	2	16	33	48	−15	38	
10	Chepinets Velingrad	30	11	4	15	38	44	−6	37	
11	Mesta Hadzhidimovo	30	11	3	16	32	42	−10	36	
12	Botev Ihtiman	30	9	5	16	29	38	−9	32	
13	Vitosha Dolna Dikanya	30	8	6	16	25	55	−30	30	
14	Septemvri Sofia	30	6	7	17	27	60	−33	25	
15	Rilski Sportist Samokov (R)	30	6	4	20	28	72	−44	22	Relegation to Regional Division
16	Minyor Bobov Dol (R)	30	2	5	23	12	66	−54	11	Relegation to Regional Division

Source: Soccerway
Rules for classification: 1) points; 2) goal difference; 3) number of goals scored.
(C) Champions; (P) Promoted; (R) Relegated
