= Stanimir Mitev =

Bulgarian footballer

Personal information
- Full name: Stanimir Nedelchev Mitev
- Date of birth: 25 October 1985 (age 41)
- Place of birth: Burgas, Bulgaria
- Height: 1.83 m (6 ft 0 in)
- Position: Midfielder

Team information
- Current team: Chernomorets Burgas
- Number: 13

Senior career*
| Years | Team | Apps | (Gls) |
| 2003–2005 | Chernomorets Burgas | 45 | (6) |
| 2005–2009 | Nesebar | 62 | (7) |
| 2010–2011 | Chernomorets Pomorie | 37 | (3) |
| 2012–2013 | Neftochimic 1986 | 24 | (2) |
| 2013 | Nesebar | 14 | (9) |
| 2014–2017 | Sozopol | 91 | (16) |
| 2018– | Chernomorets Burgas | 0 | (0) |
- * Club domestic league appearances and goals as of 5 December 2017

Stanimir Mitev (Bulgarian: Станимир Митев; born 25 October 1985) is a Bulgarian footballer who currently plays as a midfielder for Chernomorets Burgas.

== Career ==
Mitev began his career with FC Chernomorets Burgas and played for the club in the A PFG during the 2002–04 season.
