= Daniel Genov =

Daniel Genov may refer to:

- Daniel Genov (footballer born 1985), Bulgarian footballer who plays for PFC Svetkavitsa
- Daniel Genov (footballer born 1989), Bulgarian footballer who plays for Pirin Blagoevgrad
