= Plamen Donev =

Bulgarian footballer and manager

Personal information
- Date of birth: May 18, 1956 (age 70)
- Place of birth: Targovishte, Bulgaria

Senior career*
Years	Team	Apps	(Gls)
1973–1992	Svetkavitsa	355	(?)
Total		355	(?)

Managerial career
- 1996–2011: Svetkavitsa
- 2011–2012: Svetkavitsa (assistant)
- 2012–2016: Svetkavitsa
- 2017: Dunav Ruse
- 2020: Dunav Ruse
- * Club domestic league appearances and goals

Plamen Donev (Bulgarian: Пламен Донев) (born May 18, 1956) is a former Bulgarian footballer and currently manager.

On 16 October 2017, Donev was appointed as caretaker manager of Dunav Ruse following the departure of Veselin Velikov.
