= 2012–13 B Group =

Bulgarian B Group
- Season: 2012–13
- Promoted: Neftochimic; Lyubimets
- Relegated: Vidima-Rakovski; Shumen 2010; Septemvri Simitli; Sliven
- Matches: 182
- Goals: 456 (2.51 per match)
- Top goalscorer: Blagoy Nakov (17 goals)

The 2012–13 B Group was the 57th season of the Bulgarian B Football Group, the second tier of the Bulgarian football league system. It started on 19 August 2012 and finished in May 2013.

On 15 June the executive committee of Bulgarian Football Union decided to reduce further the number of teams due licensing problems in most of the clubs and reuniting the teams into one league. The new format will consist of 14 teams, playing twice against each other, once home and once away. A group of 16 teams was intended at first, but two teams decided to drop off the competition before the start of the season.

In contrast to the previous season, there was no 'promotion play-off', a decision made by the BFU to reduce the number of teams at A PFG. Instead, there were just two teams, promoting to A PFG, and 4 teams relegating from to the top league.

== Team changes from 2011–12 ==
=== Movement between A PFG and B PFG ===
The champions of the two groups of B PFG were promoted to the A PFG. These were Pirin (Gotse Delchev) (West B PFG champions) and Etar (Veliko Tarnovo) (East B PFG champions) . The third promoted team is Botev (Plovdiv), which won the promotion play-off against Sportist (Svoge).

Vidima-Rakovski, Kaliakra and Svetkavitsa were relegated after finishing in the bottom three places of the table at the end of season 2011/12.

=== Movement between B PFG and V AFG ===
During the winter break Dorostol (Silistra) and Chavdar (Byala Slatina) decided to cancel their participation on the East B PFG and West B PFG and relegated. Additionally the teams of Dobrudzha (Dobrich) and Nesebar (from East B PFG) and Slivnishki Geroi and Malesh (Mikrevo) (from West B PFG) relegated after finishing on 9th and 10th place. Additionally the teams of Chernomorets (Pomorie) and Akademik (Sofia) did not receive a professional license from the BFU and were relegated to V AFG.

On the place of those six teams came the V AFG champions Rakovski 2011 (South-East), Shumen 2010 (North-East), Pirin (Razlog) (South-West) and Spartak 1919 (Pleven) (North-West).

On 20 July 2012 Bdin (Vidin) canceled their participation from B PFG because of unpaid debts and unsatisfactory financial planning, which would not allow the club to survive throughout the season. This left the league with 15 teams only. Five days later Sportist Svoge also filed an application for exclusion from B Grupa. On 2 August the BFU confirmed that 14 teams will start the new season, with Bdin and Sportist excluded. The first games took place on 19 August.

=== Winter break ===
On 15 February the owners of Spartak Pleven announced they were going to cancel the club's participation in the championship within the next three days due to financial difficulties. All remaining fixtures were to be awarded 0–3 against them. On 21 February a new sponsor began talks to take over the club, as representatives paid the players and staff their outstanding salaries. The decision to suspend the team's participation in the 2012/13 season was overturned until the deal is finalized. On the next day a group of around 20 fans held a protest in front of the local municipality, demanding that the city takes action to help their team.

On 26 February the BFU announced it was suspending OFC Sliven 2000 due to their inability to field at least 7 players in their senior team. Due to this, the club's first spring game on 2 March at home to FC Bansko was cancelled, and the rest of their season was placed under question. The Football Union confirmed its decision in a statement released on 7 March, while also cancelling Sliven's second game against Spartak (Varna) and awarding them a 3–0 win. Four days later the BFU suspended OFC Sliven 2000 from the 2012–13 B PFG due to the club's failure to appear in two consecutive games.

== Stadia and locations ==
Location of teams in B Group 2012–13

Team	City	Stadium	Capacity
Bansko	Bansko	Saint Peter	3,000
Chavdar	Etropole	Chavdar	5,000
Kaliakra	Kavarna	Kavarna	5,000
Lyubimets	Lyubimets	Lyubimetz	5,000
Neftochimic	Burgas	Lazur	18,037
Pirin	Razlog	Pirin	2,000
Rakovski 2011	Rakovski	Rakovski	3,000
Septemvri	Simitli	Struma	8,000
Shumen 2010	Shumen	Panayot Volov	24,390
Spartak	Pleven	Pleven	22,000
Spartak	Varna	Spartak	13,000
Sliven 2000	Sliven	Hadzhi Dimitar	10,000
Svetkavitsa	Targovishte	Dimitar Burkov	8,000
Vidima-Rakovski	Sevlievo	Rakovski	8,816

== League table ==
Pos	Team	Pld	W	D	L	GF	GA	GD	Pts	Promotion or relegation
1	Neftochimic (P)	26	16	6	4	49	22	+27	54	Promotion to 2013–14 A Group
2	Lyubimets (P)	26	16	3	7	44	28	+16	51	Promotion to 2013–14 A Group
3	Rakovski 2011	26	13	9	4	38	28	+10	48	
4	Svetkavitsa	26	13	8	5	34	20	+14	47	Relegation to 2013–14 V Group
5	Bansko	26	13	7	6	48	26	+22	46	
6	Spartak Pleven	26	11	9	6	33	25	+8	42	Relegation to 2013–14 V Group
7	Spartak Varna	26	10	8	8	26	19	+7	38	
8	Chavdar Etropole	26	11	4	11	31	32	−1	37	
9	Kaliakra	26	9	7	10	33	31	+2	34	
10	Pirin Razlog	26	8	9	9	33	28	+5	33	
11	Vidima-Rakovski (R)	26	8	5	13	33	31	+2	29	Relegation to 2013–14 V Group
12	Shumen 2010 (R)	26	8	5	13	32	52	−20	29	Relegation to 2013–14 V Group
13	Septemvri Simitli (R)	26	4	3	19	18	39	−21	15	Relegation to 2013–14 V Group
14	OFC Sliven (Note: Sliven were expelled from B PFG because they did not have a squad of minimum 7 players for the beginning of the spring games. All remaining fixtures are awarded 0–3 against them and they received a 3-point deduction.) (R)	26	0	1	25	4	75	−71	−2	Relegation to 2013–14 V Group

Source: Soccerway
Rules for classification: 1st points; 2nd head-to-head points; 3rd head-to-head goal difference; 4th head-to-head goals scored; 5th goal difference; 6th number of goals scored; 7th Fair-play points; 8th Draw
(P) Promoted; (R) Relegated

== Results ==
Home \ Away	BAN	CET	KAV	LYU	NEF	PRZ	RAK	SIM	SHU	OFC	SPL	SPV	SVE	VRA
Bansko		2–1	1–1	2–3	2–2	1–1	2–1	2–0	9–2	4–0	2–0	0–0	1–2	2–0
Chavdar Etropole	3–0		0–2	1–3	1–0	1–0	0–1	2–2	1–0	3–1	2–1	1–0	1–3	1–2
Kaliakra	0–1	3–1		1–4	2–1	2–1	2–2	3–1	2–2	4–1	0–0	0–0	5–2	1–0
Lyubimets	1–2	1–2	1–0		2–1	3–2	1–1	2–1	1–0	2–0	2–1	2–2	1–1	3–1
Neftochimic	1–1	3–1	2–1	1–0		1–0	4–0	2–0	2–0	5–0	2–2	0–2	1–0	1–0
Pirin Razlog	0–0	4–0	1–0	2–1	2–5		1–1	2–0	2–2	3–0	1–1	3–0	2–2	1–2
Rakovski 2011	3–1	1–0	0–0	2–1	1–1	2–1		2–0	4–0	1–0	3–3	2–1	1–0	2–1
Septemvri Simitli	0–2	0–1	2–0	1–3	1–2	0–0	0–1		0–1	3–0	0–4	1–2	1–1	1–0
Shumen 2010	1–5	0–3	2–0	1–2	1–3	3–1	3–0	1–0		3–0	2–2	1–1	1–1	0–2
OFC Sliven	0–3	0–3	0–3	0–3	0–3	0–0	0–3	1–3	1–4		0–2	0–1	0–1	0–6
Spartak Pleven	1–0	1–0	0–0	1–0	1–2	0–1	2–2	1–0	1–0	3–0		1–0	0–0	2–1
Spartak Varna	0–2	1–1	3–0	0–1	0–0	0–2	2–0	1–0	3–0	3–0	0–0		0–0	2–0
Svetkavitsa	2–0	0–0	1–0	2–0	1–3	1–0	1–1	1–0	0–1	3–0	4–1	2–0		1–0
Vidima-Rakovski	1–1	1–1	2–1	0–1	1–1	0–0	1–1	2–1	6–1	3–0	1–2	0–2	0–2	

Source: Soccerway
Legend: Blue = home team win; Yellow = draw; Red = away team win.

== Season statistics ==
=== Top scorers ===
Rank	Scorer	Club	Goals
1	(Bulgaria) Blagoy Nakov	Bansko	17
2	(Bulgaria) Zhivko Petkov	Neftochimic Burgas	14
2	(Bulgaria) Anton Ognyanov	Lyubimets 2007	14
4	(Bulgaria) Emanuil Manev	Neftochimic Burgas	9
