= Diyan Lefterov =

Bulgarian footballer

Personal information
- Date of birth: 6 June 1988 (age 38)
- Place of birth: Bulgaria
- Height: 1.80 m (5 ft 11 in)
- Position: Defender

Senior career*
Years	Team	Apps	(Gls)
2007–2014	Neftochimic Burgas	157	(8)
2014–2016	Pomorie	31	(5)
2016–2017	Karnobat	1	(0)
2017–2022	Sozopol	43	(0)
- * Club domestic league appearances and goals as of 15 March 2022

Diyan Lefterov (Bulgarian: Диян Лефтеров; born 6 June 1988) is a Bulgarian footballer who plays as a defender.

== Career ==
In November 2012, he made his 120th league appearance for Neftochimic. On 2 August 2016, he left Pomorie. On 19 June 2017, Lefterov was announced as one of Sozopol's new signings.
