= Plamen Krumov =

Plamen Krumov may refer to:

- Plamen Krumov (footballer born 1975), Bulgarian footballer
- Plamen Krumov (footballer born 1985), Bulgarian footballer
