= Stadion Ivaylo =

Sports venue in Veliko Tarnovo, Bulgaria

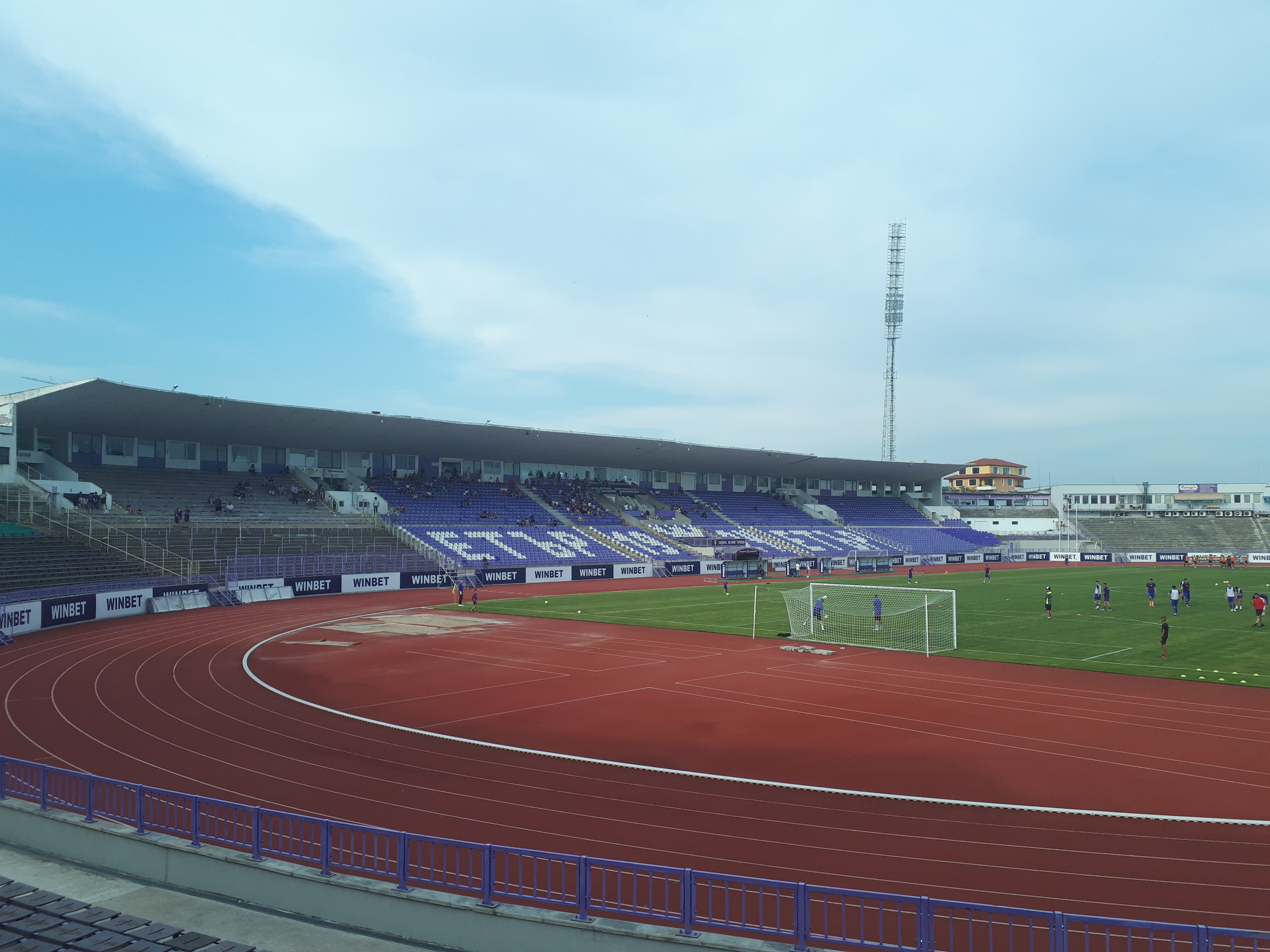
- Interactive map of Stadion Ivaylo
- Location: Veliko Tarnovo, Bulgaria
- Coordinates: 43°4′38″N 25°37′14″E
- Owner: Veliko Tarnovo Municipality
- Capacity: 15,000
- Surface: Grass
- Record attendance: 40,000

Construction
- Groundbreaking: 1953
- Opened: 1958
- Renovated: 2015

Tenants
- F.C. Etar (1958–2003); FC Etar Veliko Tarnovo (2002–2012); SFC Etar Veliko Tarnovo (2013–)

Stadion Ivaylo (Bulgarian: Стадион „Ивайло“, English: 'Ivaylo Stadium') is a multi-purpose stadium in Veliko Tarnovo, Bulgaria. It is currently used mostly for football matches and is the home ground of Etar Veliko Tarnovo. The stadium holds 18,000 people and was inaugurated on 24 May 1958. The highest attendance ever at the venue was 40,000 on 18 September 1969 during a match between Etar and Levski Sofia. The match ended with a 0-2 defeat for Etar. In 1974, the stadium hosted a first round of the 1974–75 UEFA Cup between Etar and Inter Milan (0:0) with an attendance of 27,000. On 2 October 1991, on stadium Ivaylo, Etar secured a 1:1 draw with German champions Kaiserslautern in front of 15,000 people in the first round of the 1991-92 European Cup, the only time the stadium has hosted matches of the premier European international competition.

In recent years, the stadium has hosted the final for the Cup of Bulgarian Amateur Football League six times - in 2015, 2016, 2018, 2019, 2020 and 2022.

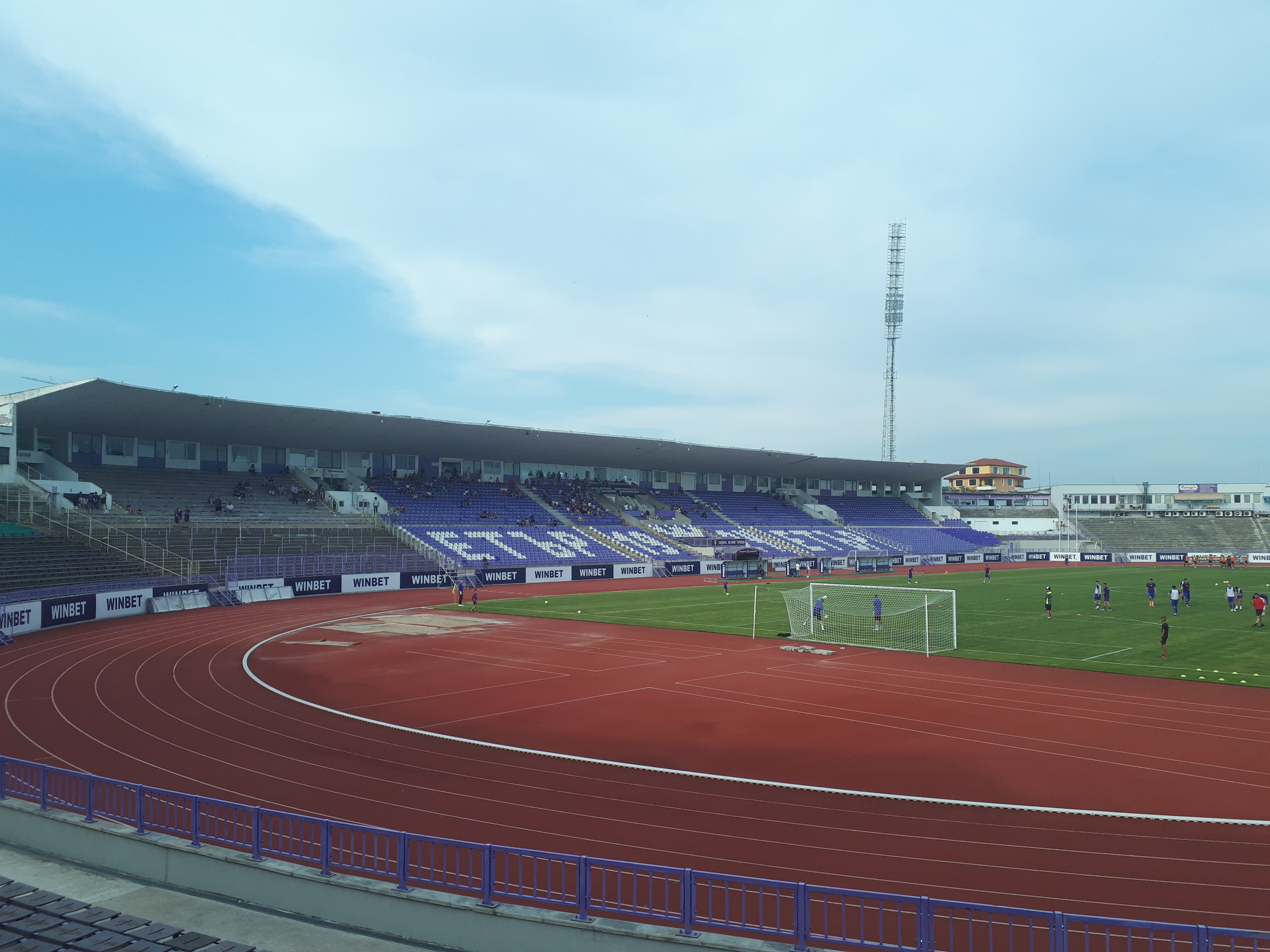

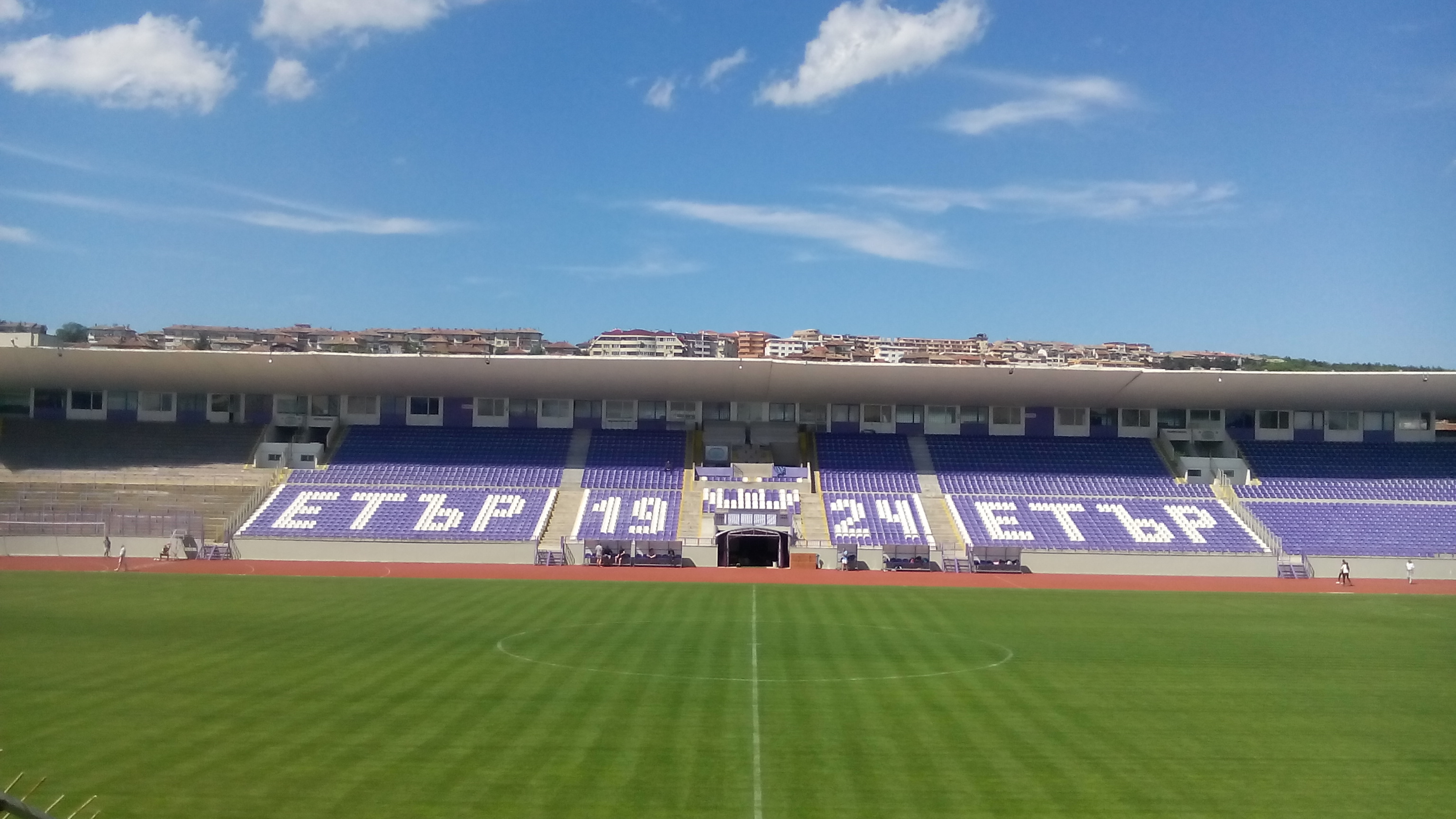
