= Anton Spasov =

Bulgarian footballer

Personal information
- Full name: Anton Dimitrov Spasov
- Date of birth: 26 March 1975 (age 51)
- Place of birth: Kazanlak, PR Bulgaria
- Height: 1.79 m (5 ft 10 1/2 in)
- Position: Striker

Team information
- Current team: Burgas Sport (manager)

Senior career*
Years	Team	Apps	(Gls)
1992–1993	Etar Veliko Tarnovo	7	(1)
1993–1996	Rozova Dolina	73	(24)
1996–1997	Chernomorets Burgas	28	(5)
1997–2004	Naftex Burgas	93	(30)
2009	Neftochimic 1986		
Total		201	(60)

International career
- Bulgaria U18

Managerial career
- 2005–2006: Pomorie (assistant manager)
- 2009–2013: Chernomorets Burgas (youth coach)
- 2013: Neftochimic 1986
- 2013: Neftochimic 1986 (assistant manager)
- 2020–: Burgas Sport
- * Club domestic league appearances and goals as of 15:48, 2 February 2009 (UTC)

Anton Spasov (Bulgarian: Антон Спасов; born 26 March 1975) is a former Bulgarian football player and now manager, currently manager of Burgas Sport.

== Career ==
Born in Kazanlak, Spasov began playing football with the local Rozova Dolina.

In 1997, he transferred to Naftex Burgas and became a top scorer in A PFG for 1998 with 17 goals. He ended his career at the age of 29 years at the end of 2003-2004 season. In 2009 at the age of 34 years, he returned to active career and signed with Neftochimic 1986 in South-East V Group.

== Honours ==
- Bulgarian League top scorer: 1998 (17 goals).
