= Atanas Nikolov =

Bulgarian footballer and manager

Personal information
- Date of birth: 21 July 1977 (age 49)
- Place of birth: Blagoevgrad, Bulgaria
- Height: 1.82 m (6 ft 0 in)
- Position: Forward

Team information
- Current team: Perun Kresna (manager)

Senior career*
Years	Team	Apps	(Gls)
1998–2001	Pirin Blagoevgrad		
2001–2003	Minyor Bobov Dol	30	(8)
2003–2005	Dorostol Silistra	37	(19)
2005–2007	Pirin 1922	51	(18)
2007–2009	Loko Mezdra	23	(18)
2009–2010	Minyor Pernik	19	(4)
2010	Pirin Blagoevgrad	4	(0)
2011–2012	Septemvri Simitli	28	(6)

Managerial career
- 2014–2017: Pirin Blagoevgrad (youth team)
- 2019–: Perun Kresna
- * Club domestic league appearances and goals

Atanas Nikolov (Bulgarian: Атанас Николов; born 21 July 1977) is a Bulgarian football manager and former player who manages Bulgarian Third League club Perun Kresna.

== Club career ==
On 15 March 2012, Nikolov scored the second goal in the historic 2:1 victory against Bulgarian powerhouse CSKA Sofia in the quarter-finals of the Bulgarian Cup.

Nikolov previously played for Pirin 1922 and Lokomotiv Mezdra in the A PFG.
