= Lionel Samba =

French footballer (born 1999)

Personal information
- Full name: Yann Lionel Mayangui Samba
- Date of birth: 20 January 1999 (age 27)
- Place of birth: Brazzaville, Republic of the Congo
- Position: Defender

Team information
- Current team: Sportist Svoge

Youth career
- US Vandoeuvre
- Créteil

Senior career*
Years	Team	Apps	(Gls)
2017–2018	Foresta Suceava		
2018–2019	Lokomotiv Dryanovo		
2019	Sevlievo	6	(0)
2020	Spartak Varna	4	(0)
2020–2022	Bylis	21	(1)
2021	→ Turbina (loan)	11	(0)
2022–2023	Sozopol	22	(1)
2023–	Sportist Svoge	54	(1)
- * Club domestic league appearances and goals as of 11 June 2026

Yann Lionel Mayangui Samba (born 20 January 1999) is a French footballer who plays as a defender for Sportist Svoge.

== Career ==
As a youth player, Samba joined the youth academy of French lower league side Épinal after almost joining the youth academy of Virton in Belgium. After that, he trialed for French Ligue 1 club Toulouse.

In 2018, Samba signed for Foresta Suceava in the Romanian third division. After that, he signed for Bulgarian third division team Sevlievo, where he stated "In Bulgaria, football is very physical, very rough football. All things considered, it can be compared to England. It reminds me of this type of game, very physical and very athletic. After Bulgarian football is not very tactical but there are many very technical players. Also, the championship is improving year by year. On the other hand, in terms of atmospheres, they are great big football fans. I have played many matches with a lot of supporters. There are ultras there and it sure sets the mood in the stadium. For me who had never known that before, it feels a bit weird but that's also why we play football, to play in atmospheres like that."

Before the second half of 2019/20, Samba signed for Spartak (Varna) in the Bulgarian second division.

Before the second half of 2020/21, he signed for Albanian top flight outfit Bylis.

In 2021, he signed for Turbina in the Albanian second division.

== Career statistics ==
As of 6 June 2021

Appearances and goals by club, season and competition
Club	Season	League			Cup		Total	
Club	Season	Division	Apps	Goals	Apps	Goals	Apps	Goals
Spartak (Varna)	2019-20	Second Professional Football League (Bulgaria)	4	0	-|-		4	0
Bylis	2020-21	Kategoria Superiore	0	0	-|-		0	0
Turbina	2020-21	Kategoria e Parë	11	0	-|-		11	0
