= Neven Venkov =

Bulgarian footballer

Personal information
- Full name: Neven Venelinov Venkov
- Date of birth: 2 May 1982 (age 44)
- Place of birth: Bulgaria
- Height: 1.83 m (6 ft 0 in)
- Position: Midfielder

Team information
- Current team: Chernolomets Popovo
- Number: 7

Senior career*
| Years | Team | Apps | (Gls) |
| 2005–2014 | Svetkavitsa | 143 | (12) |
| 2014–2015 | Chernolomets Popovo | ? | (?) |
| 2015–2016 | Svetkavitsa | 22 | (3) |
| 2016– | Chernolomets Popovo | ? | (?) |
- * Club domestic league appearances and goals as of 1 June 2019

Neven Venkov (Bulgarian: Невен Венков) (born 2 May 1982) is a Bulgarian football player currently playing for Chernolomets Popovo as a midfielder.
