= Stefan Gavrilov =

Bulgarian footballer

Personal information
- Full name: Stefan Emilov Gavrilov
- Date of birth: 9 July 2000 (age 26)
- Place of birth: Sofia, Bulgaria
- Height: 1.78 m (5 ft 10 in)
- Position: Midfielder

Team information
- Current team: Dunav Ruse
- Number: 24

Youth career
- 2008–2016: Levski Sofia
- 2016–2018: Sheffield Wednesday
- 2019: Septemvri Sofia

Senior career*
Years	Team	Apps	(Gls)
2019–2021	Septemvri Sofia	42	(2)
2021–2023	Botev Vratsa	43	(1)
2023–2026	Beroe	54	(0)
2026–	Dunav Ruse	5	(0)

International career
2016	Bulgaria U17	3	(0)
2018	Bulgaria U18	2	(0)
2018	Bulgaria U19	6	(0)
2019–2020	Bulgaria U21	2	(0)
- * Club domestic league appearances and goals as of 18 August 2026

Stefan Emilov Gavrilov (Bulgarian: Стефан Емилов Гаврилов; born 9 July 2000) is a Bulgarian professional footballer who plays as a midfielder for Dunav Ruse.

== Career ==
Born in Sofia, Gavrilov moved from the youth academy of Levski Sofia to Sheffield Wednesday in June 2016. He played two seasons for their under-18 side.

On 10 June 2026, Gavrilov signed a two-year deal with newly promoted Dunav Ruse as a free agent.
