= FC Zagorets Nova Zagora =

Bulgarian football club

FC Zagorets
- Full name: Zagorets Nova Zagora
- Founded: 1922; 104 years ago
- Ground: Stadion Zagorets, Nova Zagora
- Capacity: 5,900
- Chairman: (Bulgaria) Daniel Kirchev
- Manager: (Bulgaria) Miroslav Mindev
- League: South-East Third League
- 2022–23: South-East Third League, 4th
| Home colours | Away colours |

FC Zagorets (ФК Загорец) is a Bulgarian football club based in Nova Zagora, currently playing in the Third League, the third tier of Bulgarian football league system.

The club was founded in 1922 as FC Trakiets. They play their home games at the 5,900-capacity Stadion Zagorets. Their highest finishing position were in 1982–83, ending the season in 3rd place in B Group, the second tier of Bulgarian football.

== Honours ==
- Second League:
  - 3rd place (1): 1982–83
- Southeastern Third League:
  - Winners (1): 2016–17
- Bulgarian Cup:
  - Quarter-finals (1): 1948
- Cup of Bulgarian Amateur Football League:
  - Winners (1): 2019–20

== Current squad ==
As of 1 August 2020 Note: Flags indicate national team as defined under FIFA eligibility rules; some limited exceptions apply. Players may hold more than one non-FIFA nationality.

| No. | Pos. | Nation | Player |
|---|---|---|---|
| 1 | GK | BUL | Simeon Cholakov |
| 3 | DF | BUL | Gabriel Dimanov |
| 4 | DF | BUL | Ivan Petrov |
| 5 | FW | BUL | Angel Kostov |
| 6 | DF | BUL | Ivelin Ivanov |
| 7 | FW | BUL | Plamen Ivanov |
| 8 | FW | BUL | Denislav Atanasov |
| 9 | MF | BUL | Milen Mitev |
| 10 | MF | BUL | Dimitar Videv |
| 11 | DF | BUL | Yavor Ivanov |
| 12 | GK | BUL | Stanimir Gospodinov |

| No. | Pos. | Nation | Player |
|---|---|---|---|
| 14 | MF | BUL | Hayri Mehmed |
| 15 | MF | BUL | Kristiyan Slavov |
| 18 | DF | BUL | Bozhidar Dimitrov |
| 19 | DF | BUL | Nikolay Yankov |
| 20 | MF | BUL | Aleksandar Hardalov |
| 21 | MF | BUL | Kosta Yanev |
| 23 | DF | BUL | Dobromir Dimitrov |
| 73 | MF | BUL | Ivan Stoyanov |
| 86 | GK | BUL | Evgeni Karamanov (captain) |
| 90 | GK | BUL | Ivan S. Stoyanov |
| 99 | FW | BUL | Georgi Georgiev (vice-captain) |

== Notable players ==
- (Bulgaria) Kostadin Stoyanov
- (Bulgaria) Plamen Krumov

== Past seasons ==
| Season | League | Place | W | D | L | GF | GA | Pts | Bulgarian Cup |
|---|---|---|---|---|---|---|---|---|---|
| 2009–10 | V Group (III) | 12 | 14 | 1 | 21 | 50 | 60 | 44 | not qualified |
| 2010–11 | V Group | 3 | 23 | 9 | 6 | 69 | 37 | 78 | not qualified |
| 2011–12 | V Group | 10 | 14 | 4 | 16 | 42 | 40 | 46 | not qualified |
| 2012–13 | V Group | 15 | 10 | 8 | 16 | 30 | 41 | 38 | not qualified |
| 2013–14 | V Group | 11 | 10 | 7 | 15 | 36 | 55 | 37 | not qualified |
| 2014–15 | V Group | 7 | 13 | 7 | 10 | 50 | 31 | 46 | not qualified |
| 2015–16 | V Group | 3 | 22 | 6 | 5 | 64 | 20 | 72 | not qualified |
| 2016–17 | Third League | 1 | 26 | 6 | 2 | 77 | 13 | 84 | not qualified |
| 2017–18 | Third League | 2 | – | – | – | – | – | – | |
Green marks a season followed by promotion, red a season followed by relegation.
