= Eliseé Sou =

Burkinabé footballer

Personal information
- Date of birth: 21 October 1999 (age 27)
- Place of birth: Bobo-Dioulasso, Burkina Faso
- Position: Defensive midfielder

Team information
- Current team: Dunav Ruse
- Number: 78

Senior career*
Years	Team	Apps	(Gls)
2017–2019	Rahimo		
2019–2024	SOL Abobo	4	(4)
2024–	Dunav Ruse	53	(1)

International career^{‡}
2018–	Burkina Faso	2	(0)
- * Club domestic league appearances and goals as of 11 June 2026 ‡ National team caps and goals as of 11:44, 24 September 2018 (UTC)

Eliseé Sou (born 21 October 1999) is a Burkinabé footballer who currently plays as a defensive midfielder for Dunav Ruse.

== Career statistics ==
=== International ===
As of matches played 24 September 2018.

National team	Year	Apps	Goals
Burkina Faso	2018	2	0
Total		2	0
