= Ivo Mihaylov =

Bulgarian footballer

Personal information
- Full name: Ivo Mihaylov Mihaylov
- Date of birth: 4 April 1989 (age 37)
- Place of birth: Varna, Bulgaria
- Position: Midfielder

Team information
- Current team: Svetkavitsa
- Number: 14

Youth career
- 1999–2004: Spartak Varna
- 2004–2008: Levski Sofia

Senior career*
Years	Team	Apps	(Gls)
2007–2009	Levski Sofia	0	(0)
2008	→ Spartak Varna (loan)	10	(0)
2009	→ Belasitsa Petrich (loan)	11	(0)
2009–2011	Chavdar Etropole	40	(3)
2012–2014	Suvorovo		
2014–2016	Kaliakra Kavarna		
2016–2017	Botev Novi Pazar		
2018–2019	Spartak Varna	24	(6)
2019–	Svetkavitsa	0	(0)

International career
2008	Bulgaria U19		
- * Club domestic league appearances and goals as of 11:03, 1 June 2019 (UTC)

Ivo Mihaylov (born 4 April 1989) is a Bulgarian footballer currently playing for Svetkavitsa Targovishte as a midfielder.

== Career ==
=== Youth career ===
Ivo started his training as a youth at Spartak Varna. In 2004, he join Levski's academy.

On 2 January 2008 the left wing of Levski Sofia Ivo Mihailov was invited by his first club Spartak Varna to join in their team again. He played on loan for Spartak Varna until the end of the 2007/2008 season.

In February 2009 Ivo was loaned for six months in Belasitsa Petrich. After the end of the 08–09 season, he returned to Levski, but he was expected to be loaned again.

=== FC Chavdar Etropole ===
On 30 June 2009, Mihailov was sold to FC Chavdar Etropole.

=== Return to Spartak ===
On 17 January 2018 he rejoined his youth club Spartak Varna.
