= Stadion Dimitar Burkov =

Stadium in Targovishte, Bulgaria

Coordinates: 43.23572°N 26.57260°E

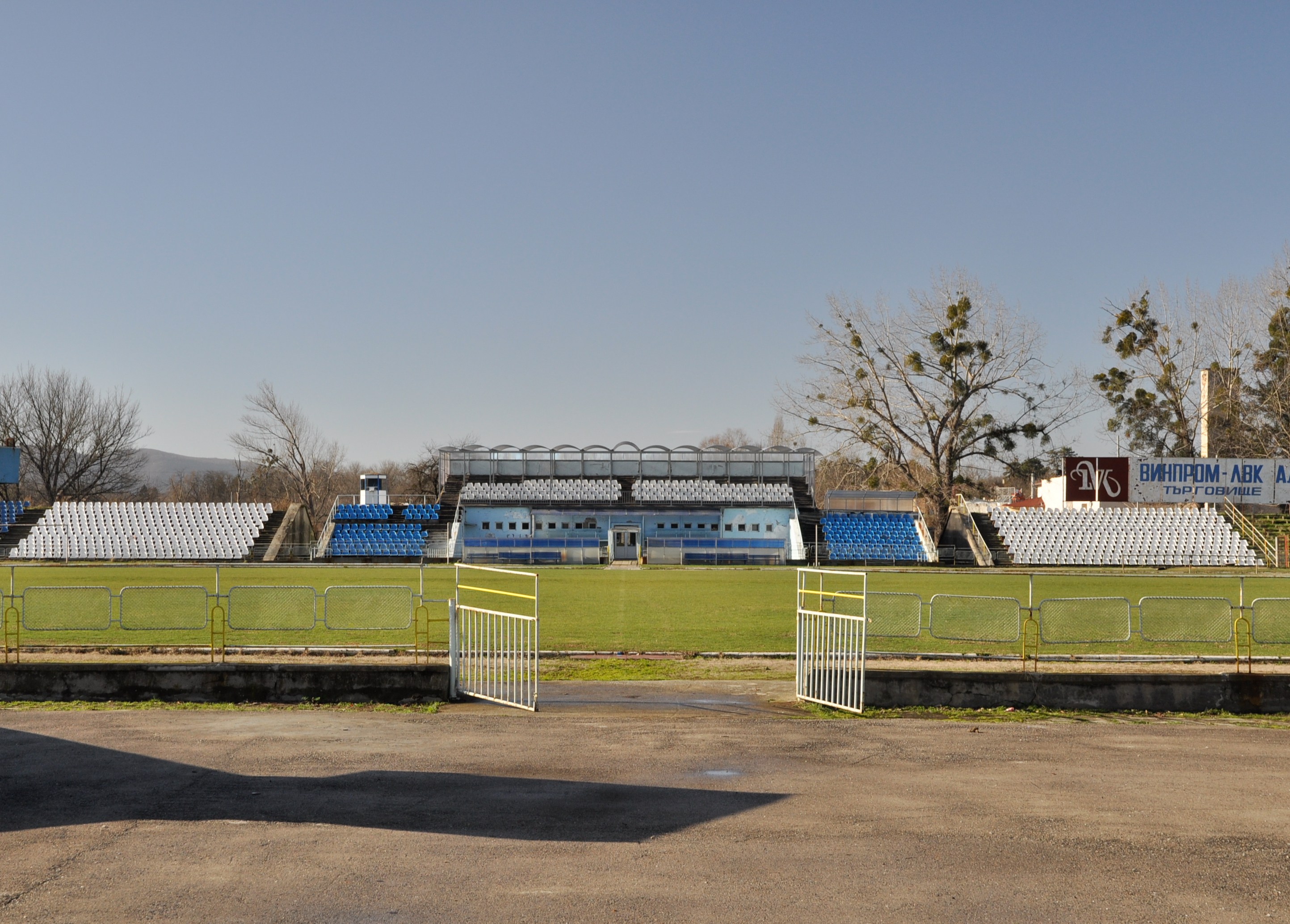
- Interactive map of Stadion Dimitar Burkov
- Full name: Stadion Dimitar Burkov
- Location: Targovishte, Bulgaria
- Capacity: 10,000
- Surface: Grass

Tenant
- Svetkavitsa Targovishte

Stadion Dimitar Burkov (Bulgarian: Стадион „Димитър Бурков“, English: 'Dimitar Burkov Stadium') is a stadium in Targovishte, Bulgaria. It has a capacity of 10,000 spectators. It is the home ground of PFK Svetkavitsa 1922.

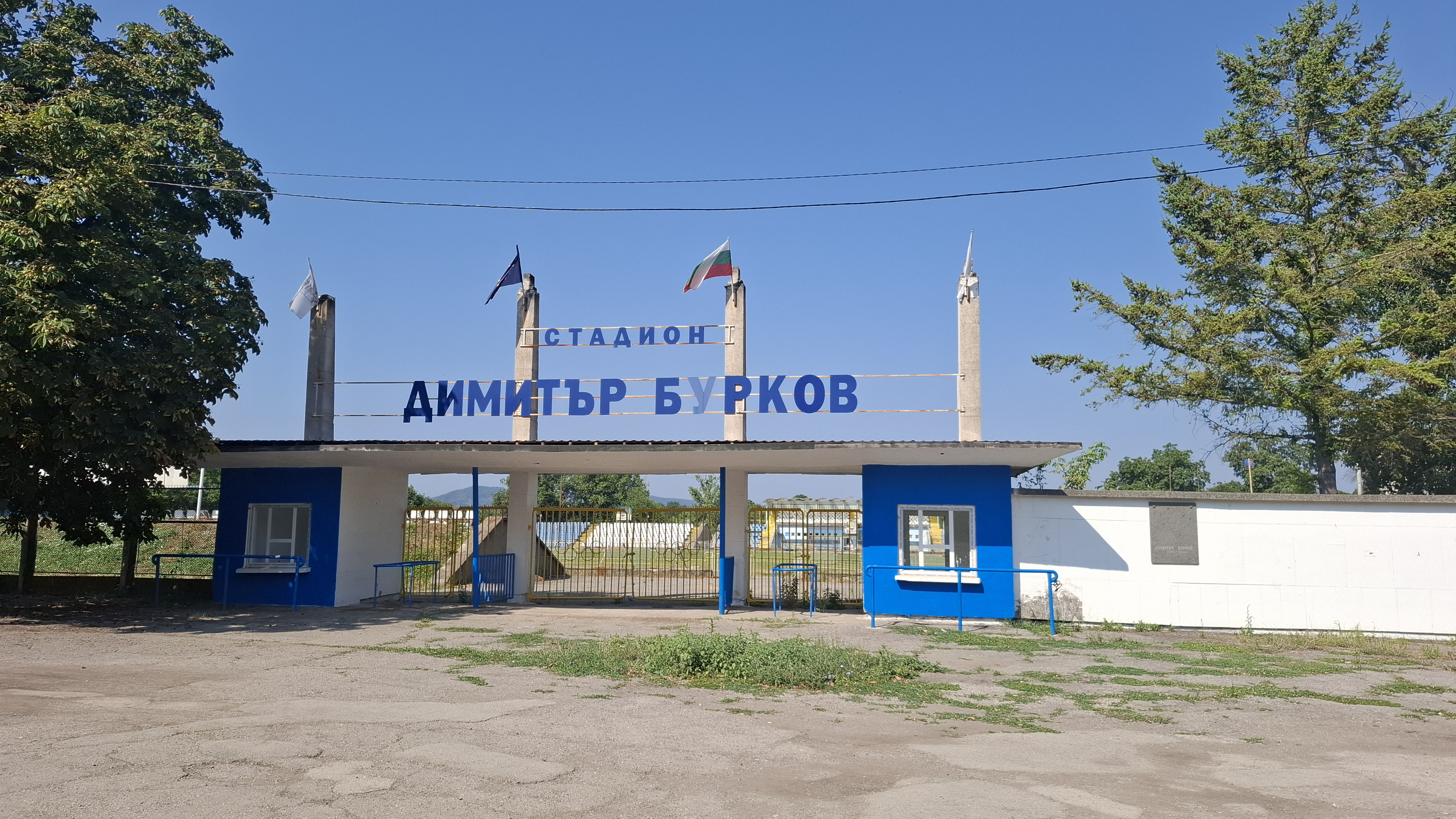
Dimitar Burkov Stadium in August 2026
