= Yavor Ivanov (footballer) =

Bulgarian footballer

Personal information
- Full name: Yavor Tenev Ivanov
- Date of birth: 11 September 1991 (age 35)
- Place of birth: Sliven, Bulgaria
- Height: 1.89 m (6 ft 2 1/2 in)
- Position: Defender

Team information
- Current team: Zagorets
- Number: 11

Youth career
- Sliven 2000

Senior career*
Years	Team	Apps	(Gls)
2009–2015	Sliven 2000	30	(0)
2015–	Zagorets	80	(5)
- * Club domestic league appearances and goals as of 08:43, 21 May 2017 (UTC)

Yavor Ivanov (Bulgarian: Явор Иванов; born 11 September 1991 in Sliven) is a Bulgarian football player who plays for Zagorets Nova Zagora as a defender.

== Career ==
Ivanov is a product of Sliven's youth system. He made his debut during the 2009–10 season - on 25 March 2010 in a 0–1 away loss against Litex Lovech, coming on as a substitute for Aleksandar Tonev.
