= Plamen Krumov (footballer, born 1975) =

Bulgarian footballer

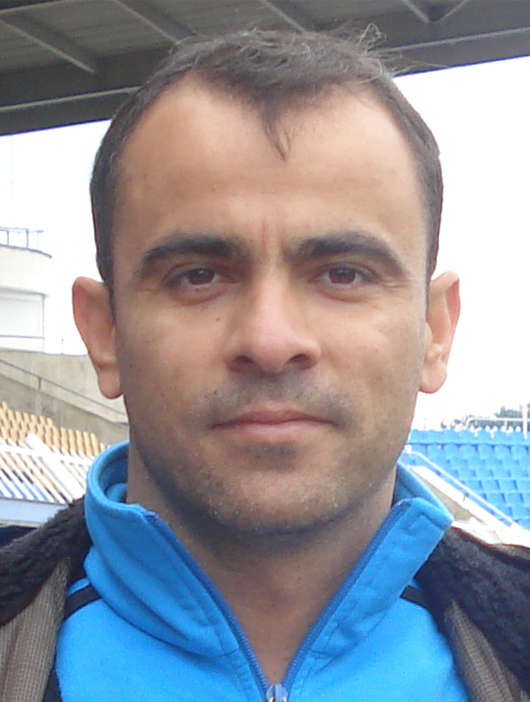

Personal information
- Full name: Plamen Stoyanov Krumov
- Date of birth: 23 January 1975 (age 51)
- Place of birth: Sliven, Bulgaria
- Height: 1.69 m (5 ft 7 in)
- Position: Forward

Team information
- Current team: Sinite kamani Sliven

Senior career*
| Years | Team | Apps | (Gls) |
| 1992–1994 | OFC Zagorets | ? | (?) |
| 1994–1996 | Sliven | ? | (?) |
| 1996–1999 | Maritsa Plovdiv | 24 | (15) |
| 1999 | CSKA Sofia | 0 | (0) |
| 2000–2001 | Botev Plovdiv | 29 | (4) |
| 2001–2003 | Spartak Varna | 44 | (10) |
| 2003–2006 | Naftex Burgas | 48 | (20) |
| 2006–2008 | Chernomorets Burgas | 51 | (24) |
| 2008 | Naftex Burgas | 12 | (6) |
| 2009–2010 | Chernomorets Burgas | 15 | (2) |
| 2014 | Chernomorets Burgas | 1 | (0) |
| 2020– | Sinite kamani Sliven | 0 | (0) |

Managerial career
- 2010–2011: Chernomorets Burgas (youth academy director)
- * Club domestic league appearances and goals

Plamen Krumov (Bulgarian: Пламен Крумов, born 23 January 1975) is a Bulgarian football forward.

He played as a striker for OFC Zagorets, Sliven, Maritsa, CSKA Sofia, Botev Plovdiv, Spartak Varna, Naftex and Chernomorets on left and right attack. Krumov was signed with Chernomorets in January 2009 for a free transfer from Naftex Burgas. From 2010 to 2011 he was the director of Chernomorets Burgas's youth academy.

== Career ==
Krumov started his career in his home town Sliven on the local team PFC Sliven. After that he played for Maritsa Plovdiv, CSKA Sofia, Botev Plovdiv, Spartak Varna, PFC Naftex Burgas and Chernomorets. On 16 May 2010, he ended his career against CSKA Sofia 2–0. In August 2014, Krumov came out of retirement to play for Chernomorets Burgas in the B PFG.
