= Komatevo =

Community of Plovdiv, Bulgaria

Coordinates: 42°06′N 24°42′E

Komatevo (Bulgarian: Коматево) is a neighbourhood of the city of Plovdiv, southern Bulgaria. It has 6,500 inhabitants.

Komatevo was a village up to 1969 when it was incorporated into Plovdiv together with Proslav. The neighbourhood is connected to the city center through the Komatevo highway. There are also roads to the villages of Markovo and Parvenets.

== History ==
The first sources for the existence of Komatevo are from 1477. The settlement was formed by Christian soldiers enjoying special privileges in the Ottoman Empire. Every year for a six months period (from 1 April to 2 October) they took care of the sultan's stables near Plovdiv or participated in the convoy of the imperial army during campaigns. According to one of the legends, when the sultan passed through the village for the first time, he was impressed by how small it was and said: "It's as small as a loaf of bread!"("Комат" in Bulgarian). Hence the name Komatevo. At the outbreak of the Balkan War in 1912, four people from Komatevo were volunteers in the Macedonian-Edirne militia.
