= FC Dunav Ruse =

Bulgarian football club

Dunav Ruse
- Full name: Football Club Dunav from Ruse
- Nickname: Драконите (The Dragons)
- Founded: 16 February 1949; 77 years ago
- Ground: Gradski Stadion
- Capacity: 13,000
- Owner: Fans Association / Academy Managers
- Head coach: Georgi Chilikov
- League: First League
- 2025–26: Second League, 1st of 20 (promoted)
- Website: fcdunav.bg
Home colours	Away colours	Third colours

FC Dunav (Bulgarian: Дунав, officially named "Дунав от Русе") is a Bulgarian professional football club based in Ruse, which will compete in the First League, the first tier of the Bulgarian football league system, following promotion in 2026.

Part of a larger sports branch, Dunav were established on February 16, 1949, as a merger of two local football clubs in the city, Dinamo and Rusenets. Nicknamed The Dragons (Bulgarian: Драконите), Dunav's home colours are sky blue and white. Named after the Danube River, on the banks of which the city of Ruse is situated, the club plays its home matches at the local Gradski stadion, which has a seating capacity of 13,000 spectators.

Among the club's most notable achievements are a final in the Bulgarian championship in 1937, a First League fourth place in 1975, 1989 and 2017, and four domestic cup finals in 1938, 1939, 1941 and 1962 respectively. The club's most recent top flight participation has been during the 2019–20 season.

== History ==
=== Domestic ===
Over the course of its history, the club carried a variety of different names such as Sava, Napredak, Levski, Varush, Angel Kanchev, Rakovski, Rusenets, Dinamo, Spartak, DNA, Torpedo and Partizanin. Dunav played in the A Group over a number of seasons between 1937 and 1940, 1951, 1956, 1958–67, 1968–73, 1974–77, 1984–86, and 1988–91 before being relegated again.

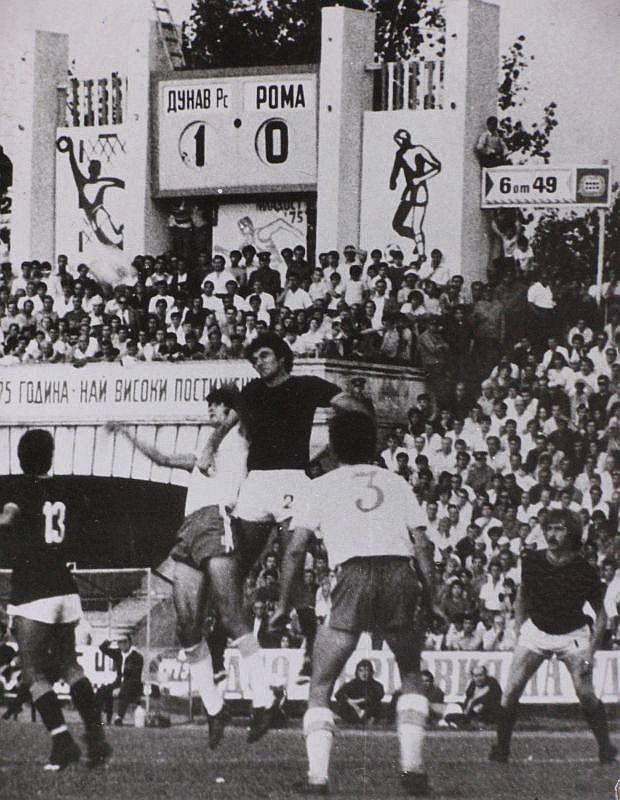
Dunav playing against Serie A club Roma at the Municipal Stadium in 1975.

Following years of several movements between lower divisions, a decent squad, established by playing manager Engibar Engibarov at the time, eventually won the Cup of Bulgarian Amateur Football League in 2003–04 and for the next season they finally gained promotion to the B PFG after a long-term absence in the amateur divisions. It was to be their first appearance in professional football since the club was relegated from the A Group in 1991.

From January 5, 2006, until October 2 of the same year, Dunav were managed by Ferario Spasov. He acquired some well-known footballers and loaned talented players from Litex Lovech in an unsuccessful attempt to reach the first division again.

The 2009–10 season in the B Group was very narrow for the club as the dream of reaching the A Group almost became a reality. Dunav finished the first half of the season in first place, leaving behind the teams of Kaliakra Kavarna and Nesebar. The second half of the season started very well and the team was in a row with a couple of very significant wins, but they won only one game in their last 7 matches and eventually failed to gain promotion to the top flight.

In the following years, Dunav again failed to impress and was mostly seen as a middle table club in the final ranking of the B Group. In 2010–11, the club was left by some of its good players, as a result of ongoing financial difficulties in the team. Dunav subsequently withdrew from the B Group in February 2011, after being unable to reduce its financial debts to the municipality and a majority of its squad players. A few days later, the club announced bankruptcy and was dissolved.

In 2011, Dr. Simeon Simeonov established a new entity under the name Dunav 2010, which was approved by the BFU to start from the lowest levels of Bulgarian football. The team obtained license and after several court decisions in the following months, it regained the traditions and history of its predecessor. In 2015, the club won the Bulgarian Amateur Cup and was promoted to the second division.

In 2016, Dunav 2010 became champions of the 2015-16 B Group and were promoted to the top flight for the first time since 1991, 25 years after their last participation. They completed in the debut season of the newly renamed Bulgarian First League. Their first year in the BFL was an instant success, as they finished fourth and qualified for Europa League.

Ever since, Dunav's financial situation has been very unstable, despite the club playing in the top tier.

During the winter break of the 2019–20 season, Dunav owners stated that the team might face administrative relegation if a new income source is not provided on time. However, the club continued to participate in the top tier until the very end of the 2019-20 season, finishing 13'th in the league, proceeding to relegation Group B in the company of fellow top tier Botev Plovdiv ( losing 3–1 at Plovdiv), FC Arda ( winning 2–0 at Kardjali) and Botev Vratsa ( losing 3–1 at Ruse, Bulgaria). As a result, finishing 4'th in the group ( last place), qualifying for the relegation playoffs. In a group, competing against Botev Vratsa ( drawing 0–0 at Vratsa) and Tsarsko Selo ( winning 1–0 at Rousse), finishing second in the group. Second place meaning a Relegation play-off final against the third from the Second Professional Football League (Bulgaria), where Dunav lost 4–1 to FC Montana, thus being relegated. However, Dunav's financial situation and poor ownership led to the club being taken over by the fans' association and academy coaches, announcing on 4 August 2020 that Dunav will compete in the Third League.

After two seasons in the third level, Dunav managed to promote to the Second League, at the end of the 2021–22 season.

=== European ===
On an international basis, Dunav's debut entry in the European club competitions dates back to the 1975-76 UEFA Cup, where they were drawn against Roma of the Italian Serie A. Dunav were subsequently eliminated after a 2–0 defeat in Rome and a notable 1–0 win over the Italian team in Ruse. In 2017, they managed to secure a spot in the first qualifying round of the Europa League after a prolonged period of European absence, but were eliminated by Irtysh Pavlodar after an overall 0–3 loss in both legs.

== Honours ==
=== Domestic ===
- First League:
  - Fourth place: 1974–75, 2016–17
- Bulgarian Cup:
  - Runners-up: 1961–62
- Second League:
  - Winners (7): 1950, 1954, 1957, 1968, 1974, 2015–16, 2025–26
- Third League:
  - Winners (2): 2014–15, 2021–22
- A Regional Group:
  - Winners (1): 2010–11
- Cup of Bulgarian Amateur Football League:
  - Winners (2 times – record): 2004, 2015

== European record ==
=== Matches ===
Season	Competition	Round	Club	Home	Away	Aggregate
1975–76	UEFA Cup	1R	(Italy) Roma	1–0	0–2	1–2
2017–18	UEFA Europa League	1Q	(Kazakhstan) Irtysh Pavlodar	0–2	0–1	0–3

== Players ==
=== Current squad ===
As of 23 June 2026

Note: Flags indicate national team as defined under FIFA eligibility rules; some limited exceptions apply. Players may hold more than one non-FIFA nationality.

No.	Pos.	Nation	Player
1	GK	POL	Bartosz Żelazowski
2	DF	BUL	Mario Dilchovski
4	DF	COL	José Cabarcas
5	DF	CYP	Kyriakos Antoniou
6	DF	BUL	Stanislav Yovkov
8	FW	ESP	Bilal Bakkali
9	FW	ESP	Alex Valiño
10	MF	BUL	Kristiyan Boychev
11	FW	BUL	Denislav Minchev
14	MF	BUL	Radoslav Apostolov (captain)
17	MF	BEL	William Fonkeu
18	FW	FRA	Ibrahim Keita
19	MF	BUL	Stefan Stefanov

No.	Pos.	Nation	Player
22	DF	BUL	Stoyan Predev
23	FW	USA	Jordan Saint-Louis
24	MF	BUL	Stefan Gavrilov
33	GK	BUL	Georgi Kitanov
36	MF	GHA	Charles Yaw Appiah
39	DF	POR	André Alves
44	MF	SRB	Vladan Vidaković
51	DF	BUL	Ilker Budinov
69	GK	BUL	Plamen Pepelyashev
77	MF	BUL	Aleksandar Simeonov
78	MF	BFA	Eliseé Sou
88	DF	BUL	Dimitar Todorov
93	DF	BUL	Bozhidar Chorbadzhiyski

For recent transfers, see Transfers winter 2025–26 and Transfers summer 2026.

== Notable players ==
Had international caps for their respective countries, held any club record, or have more than 100 league appearance. Players whose name is listed in bold represented their countries.

Bulgaria

- (Bulgaria) **Diyan Angelov**
- (Bulgaria) Miroslav Budinov
- (Bulgaria) Diyan Dimov
- (Bulgaria) **Engibar Engibarov**
- (Bulgaria) **Yordan Filipov**
- (Bulgaria) **Kostadin Hazurov**
- (Bulgaria) **Nikola Hristov**
- (Bulgaria) **Georgi Iliev**
- (Bulgaria) **Ismail Isa**
- (Bulgaria) **Birsent Karagaren**
- (Bulgaria) Ivaylo Kirilov
- (Bulgaria) Branimir Kostadinov
- (Bulgaria) Martin Kovachev
- (Bulgaria) **Svetoslav Kovachev**
- (Bulgaria) **Martin Lukov**
- (Bulgaria) **Blagoy Makendzhiev**
- (Bulgaria) **Iliya Milanov**
- (Bulgaria) Mihail Milchev
- (Bulgaria) Miroslav Mironov
- (Bulgaria) **Anatoli Nankov**
- (Bulgaria) Yuliyan Nenov
- (Bulgaria) **Ivan Paskov**
- (Bulgaria) Petar Patev
- (Bulgaria) **Boyan Peykov**
- (Bulgaria) **Ivaylo Radentsov**
- (Bulgaria) **Georgi Sokolov**
- (Bulgaria) **Georgi Velinov**
- (Bulgaria) Nikola Yordanov

Africa

- (Burkina Faso) **Eliseé Sou**
- (Ghana) **Samuel Inkoom**

Asia

- (Lebanon) **Samir Ayass**
- (Tajikistan) **Nuriddin Davronov**
- (Tajikistan) **Iskandar Dzhalilov**
- (Turkmenistan) **Igor Kislov**

== Past/Current seasons ==
Season	Lvl	League	Place	W	D	L	GF	GA	Pts	Bulgarian Cup
2010–11	IV	A RFG	1	9	0	2	20	8	27	First round
2011–12	III	V Group	6	12	10	6	48	19	46	not qualified
2012–13	III	V Group	2	24	2	2	86	15	74	not qualified
2013–14	II	B Group	13	6	9	11	24	32	27	First round
2014–15	III	V Group	1	28	1	1	121	11	85	Second round
2015–16	II	B Group	1	18	10	2	53	19	64	Second round
2016–17	I	First League	4	15	10	11	46	44	55	Quarterfinals
2017–18	I	First League	12	11	7	19	31	50	40	Quarterfinals
2018–19	I	First League	11	9	9	19	40	59	36	Second round
2019–20	I	First League	13	6	8	17	26	55	26	First round
2020–21	III	Third League	5	16	5	7	60	33	53	Preliminary Round
**Green marks a season followed by promotion, red a season followed by relegation.**
