= Daniel Genov (footballer, born 1985) =

Bulgarian footballer

Personal information
- Full name: Daniel Zhechkov Genov
- Date of birth: 5 May 1985 (age 41)
- Place of birth: Targovishte, Bulgaria
- Position: Midfielder

Youth career
- Svetkavitsa
- Naftex Burgas

Senior career*
Years	Team	Apps	(Gls)
2004–2007	Naftex Burgas	7	(0)
2004–2006	→ Pomorie (loan)	32	(1)
2007–2008	Svetkavitsa	26	(3)
2008–2009	Lokomotiv Sofia	0	(0)
2009	→ Belasitsa Petrich (loan)	11	(0)
2009–2014	Svetkavitsa	115	(10)
2015	Dobrudzha Dobrich	23	(0)
2016	Botev Vratsa	12	(0)
2016–2017	Svetkavitsa		
2017–2018	Spartak Pleven		
2018–2020	Svetkavitsa		
- * Club domestic league appearances and goals

Daniel Zhechkov Genov (Bulgarian: Даниел Жечков Генов; born 5 May 1985, in Targovishte) is a Bulgarian retired footballer who played as a defender.
