= Ivan Chergev =

Bulgarian football forward

Personal information
- Date of birth: 21 March 1987 (age 39)
- Place of birth: Stara Zagora, Bulgaria
- Height: 1.80 m (5 ft 11 in)
- Position: Forward

Youth career
- Beroe

Senior career*
Years	Team	Apps	(Gls)
2006–2009	Loko Stara Zagora	48	(5)
2009	Botev Galabovo	?	(?)
2010–2011	Beroe	6	(0)
2011–	Botev Galabovo	?	(?)
- * Club domestic league appearances and goals as of 20 January 2010

Ivan Chergev (Bulgarian: Иван Чергев) (born 21 March 1987) is a Bulgarian football forward.
