= FC Sozopol =

Bulgarian football club

- Full name: Football Club Sozopol
- Founded: 2008
- Ground: Arena Sozopol
- Capacity: 3,500
- Chairman: Panayot Reyzi
- Head coach: Margarit Dimov
- League: Southeast Third League
- 2022–23: Second League, 16th (relegated)
Home colours	Away colours

Sozopol (Bulgarian: Созопол) is a Bulgarian association football club based in Sozopol, currently playing in the Second League, the second level of Bulgarian football.

== History ==
In 2008 Sozopol secured promotion to the South-East V AFG in their inaugural season. They spent six seasons in the division, moving to the brand-new 2000 capacity all-seater Arena Sozopol in 2012. The club finally won the South-East V group during the 2013/14 season, achieving promotion to professional football for the first time. During the same year, Sozopol reached the Round of 16 of the 2013–14 Bulgarian Cup, losing 8–1 on aggregate to Litex.

They finished their first B Group season in 6th place out of 16 teams, and expanded their stadium by building a South Stand, bringing the total capacity to 3,500. During the 2015–16 Bulgarian Cup, the team reached the quarterfinals for the first time, beating OFC Etar Veliko Tarnovo in the Round of 16 and A Group member PFC Botev Plovdiv in the 1/8 finals. They were eventually knocked out after a 3–0 defeat to CSKA Sofia, but finished the 2015–16 season in 4th place in the B Group, a record position for the club.

In 2018, Sozopol was relegated to the third tier after finishing second to last in the 2017–18 season. In 2020, Sozopol promoted to the Second League, after 2 years in the third tier.

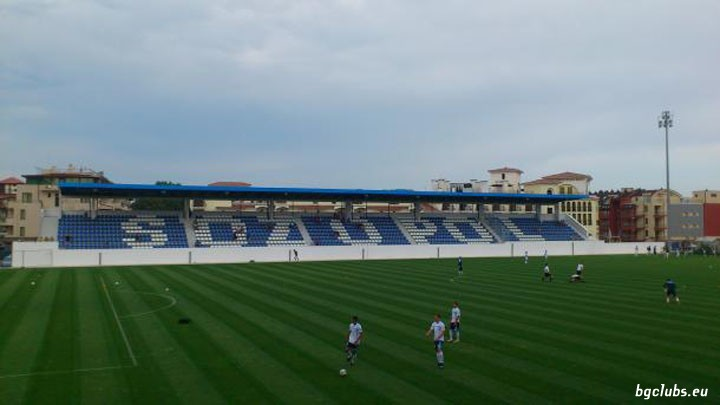
Arena Sozopol

== Honours ==
Bulgarian B Group:

- 4th place: 2015–16, 2016–17

South-East V AFG:

- Winners (2): 2013–14, 2019–20

Bulgarian Cup:

- Quarterfinals (1): 2015–16

== Current squad ==
As of 4 February 2023

Note: Flags indicate national team as defined under FIFA eligibility rules; some limited exceptions apply. Players may hold more than one non-FIFA nationality.

No.	Pos.	Nation	Player
2	DF	BUL	Marian Dimitrov
4	MF	BUL	Daniel Dimitrov
5	DF	BUL	Petar Genchev
6	DF	BUL	Georgi Gospodinov
7	DF	BUL	Dimitar Zhekov
8	MF	BUL	Emanuil Manev
9	FW	NGR	Job Okpanachi
10	MF	BUL	Antonio Laskov
11	MF	BUL	Galin Dimov
12	GK	BUL	Rosen Andonov
14	MF	BUL	Milen Gamakov

No.	Pos.	Nation	Player
16	MF	BUL	Daniel Ivanov
17	FW	BUL	Daniel Ivanov
18	MF	BUL	Bozhidar Kiryakov
21	DF	BUL	Daniel Andreev
23	DF	BUL	Diyan Moldovanov
27	GK	BUL	Petar Rahnev
32	MF	BUL	Anton Uzunov
77	FW	BUL	Borislav Trendafilov
88	DF	CGO	Lionel Samba
99	MF	BEL	Guillaume Thiry

For recent transfers, see Transfers summer 2022.

== Notable players ==
Had international caps for their respective countries, held any club record, or had more than 100 league appearances. Players whose name is listed in bold represented their countries.

Bulgaria

- (Bulgaria) **Nikolay Domakinov**
- (Bulgaria) **Milen Gamakov**
- (Bulgaria) Stanimir Mitev
- (Bulgaria) Diyan Moldovanov
- (Bulgaria) **Kostadin Stoyanov**

Africa

- (Rwanda) **Glen Habimana**

== Past seasons ==
Season	League	Place	W	D	L	GF	GA	Pts	Bulgarian Cup
2008–09	V Group (III)	9	14	9	13	47	51	51	DNQ
2009–10	V Group	6	20	2	14	58	33	62	DNQ
2010–11	V Group	4	22	5	11	89	31	71	Second round
2011–12	V Group	8	17	5	12	54	31	56	DNQ
2012–13	V Group	9	15	6	13	51	32	51	DNQ
2013–14	V Group	1	26	3	3	104	25	81	Second round
2014–15	B Group (II)	6	12	10	8	39	25	46	First round
2015–16	B Group	4	13	10	7	44	28	49	Quarterfinals
2016–17	Second League (II)	4	14	8	8	38	25	50	Second round
2017–18	Second League	15	6	6	18	25	47	24	First round
**Green marks a season followed by promotion, red a season followed by relegation.**
