= PFC Neftochimic Burgas (2009–2014) =

Neftochimic
- Full name: Професионален футболен клуб Нефтохимик 1986 Бургас (Professional football club Neftochimic 1986 Burgas)
- Nickname: Шейховете (The Sheiks)
- Founded: 7 July 2009; 17 years ago
- Dissolved: 27 June 2014; 12 years ago
- Ground: Nesebar Stadium, Nesebar
- Capacity: 7,000
- 2013–14: A Group, 12th /relegated/
Home colours	Away colours	Third colours

Neftochimic 1986 (Bulgarian: Нефтохимик 1986) was a Bulgarian association football club based in Burgas. The club participated in the A Group, the first tier of Bulgarian football. Neftochimic was founded in 2009 and was claimed that is the official successor of the traditions and successes of the disbanded Naftex Burgas, which was founded in 1962.

== Club colours ==
Green	White

=== Kit history ===
Period	Shirt sponsor
2009–2011	Eurobuilding Engineering
2011–2012	Municipality of Burgas
2012–2013	LUKOIL
2013–2014	none

Period	Kit manufacturer
2009–2010	Tomy Sport
2010–2011	Nike
2011–2012	Tomy Sport
2012–2013	Legea
2013–2014	Krasiko

== Honours ==
=== Domestic ===
Cup of Bulgarian Amateur Football League:

- Winner (1): 2011

== History ==
=== 1962–2009 ===
The club was created in 1962 by a group of workers, laying the foundations of the future Petroleum Refinery Neftochim, which had not yet been named. The team started in A regional group under the name of Stroitel. In 1964 the Refinery was finally named Neftochim and the team's name was also changed to Neftochimic. Year later, the team earned its promotion to B PFG.

In 1993, Dimitar Dimitrov signed as a manager of the team and it won the Bulgarian Eastern B PFG and qualifies in the Bulgarian top division for the first time in its history. Neftochimic finished at 8th place in its first season and reached the semifinals of the Bulgarian Cup eliminating champions Levski Sofia on its way. The second season in the Bulgarian A PFG was among the most successful season in the history of the club. Neftochimic finished 4th and won the Professional League Cup. In 1997, Neftochimic finished second after a series of referee's mistakes in favor of champions CSKA Sofia and won again the Professional League Cup. In the following years, Neftochimic established itself as one of the best teams in the country regularly finishing in places allowing the team to participate in the UEFA Cup.

In February 2004, Portochanov resigned as a president of Naftex and the club began experiencing serious troubles. Many of the very strong and experienced players that brought success to Naftex were sold and the new management managed the club carelessly allowing it to fall out of the A PFG in 2006.

=== 2009–2014 ===
On 6 July 2009, Naftex Burgas stopped its existence. On 7 July the amateur football club Athletic was renamed to Neftochimic 1986 and was subsequently declared by the owners as a successor of the old team. It began playing in the 2009–10 Bulgarian V AFG, the third tier of football in the country, finishing third in its debut season and barely missing on a promotion. During the following 2010–11 season the team finished second, completing a quick return to professional football. Neftochimic also won the 2011 Bulgarian Amateur Football League Cup.

At the conclusion of the 2011–12 B PFG the Sheiks barely missed on a place in the promotion play-off, finishing in third place just two points behind PFC Botev Plovdiv. However, at the halfway stage of the 2012–13 B PFG they were on top of the division and achieved promotion for the A PFG for the 2013-14 season. The club's first season in the Bulgarian elite proved to be difficult. They started well, collecting seven points from their first four games. However, Neftohimik then lost eight games in a row, putting them in 13th place. Results did not improve, as the Sheiks collected only five points from their last 14 games, thus capturing the last place in the regular season. Neftohimik only collected 12 points, scored the fewest goals from all teams, only 15, and had the worst goal difference, -51. In the relegation group, along with six other teams, the Sheiks had to achieve a miracle if they wanted to remain among the elite next season. Results somewhat improved, with the Sheiks managing to beat Beroe Stara Zagora, Lyubimets 2007, and PFC Pirin Gotse Delchev at home, as well as winning against Lyubimets away and drawing against Pirin Gotse Delchev away. They earned 25 points in total, and although they moved from 14th place to 12th place, their relegation was still confirmed, being 29 points under the relegation line, since Lokomotiv Sofia had 54 points and avoided a drop to the second level.

Neftohimik was supposed to play in the 2014-15 B PFG next season, however on 27 June 2014, it was announced that the club was dissolving due to financial debts. A new team, called PFC Neftochimic Burgas, was founded to replace it.

== Notable players ==
Had international caps for their respective countries, held any club record, or had more than 100 league appearances. Players whose name is listed in bold represented their countries.

Bulgaria

- (Bulgaria) Diyan Lefterov
- (Bulgaria) **Stoyko Sakaliev**
- (Bulgaria) **Mitko Trendafilov**
- (Bulgaria) **Kosta Yanev**
- (Bulgaria) Stanislav Zhekov

== Performance by seasons ==
Season		Pos.	Pl.	W	D	L	GS	GA	P	Cup	Notes
2009–10	V AFG	**3**	36	24	5	7	89	28	**77**	--	
2010–11	V AFG	**2**	38	25	6	7	100	31	**81**	--	Promoted
2011–12	B PFG	**3**	27	14	7	6	46	28	**49**	1/16	
2012–13	B PFG	**1**	26	16	6	4	49	22	**54**	1/8	Promoted
2013–14	A PFG	**12**	38	7	4	27	26	92	**25**	1/16	Relegated

== Managers ==
- (Bulgaria) Angel Stoykov (Oct 1, 2011 – June 30, 2012)
- (Bulgaria) Dimcho Nenov (July 1, 2012 – April 8, 2013)
- (Bulgaria) Anton Spasov (April 10, 2013 – July 16, 2013)
- (Bulgaria) Valeri Damyanov (July 16, 2013 – September 1, 2013)
- (Bulgaria) Anton Spasov (September 1, 2013 – October 24, 2013)
- (Bulgaria) Atanas Atanasov (October 24, 2013 – December 25, 2013)
- (Bulgaria) Zlatko Yankov (February 7, 2014 – June 27, 2014)
