= FC Perun Kresna =

Bulgarian football club

Perun
- Full name: Football Club Perun Kresna
- Founded: 2014
- Chairman: Valentin Drachev
- Manager: Atanas Nikolov
- League: South-West Third League
- 2020–21: 17th (relegated)
Home colours	Away colours

Football Club Perun (Bulgarian: Футболен клуб Перун) is a Bulgarian association football club based in Kresna, currently playing in the South-West Third League, the third level of Bulgarian football.

== Current squad ==
As of 1 September 2019 Note: Flags indicate national team as defined under FIFA eligibility rules; some limited exceptions apply. Players may hold more than one non-FIFA nationality.

No.	Pos.	Nation	Player
2	DF	BUL	Borislav Borislavov
3	DF	BUL	Bozhidar Stanchev
4	DF	BUL	Daniel Markov
5	DF	BUL	Teodor Bachev
6	MF	BUL	Konstantin Mitev
7	MF	BUL	Blagovest Angelov
8	MF	BUL	Asen Krushovski
10	MF	BUL	Ivan Georgiev
11	MF	BUL	Ventsislav Malamov

No.	Pos.	Nation	Player
13	MF	BUL	Martin Topuzov
14	FW	BUL	Ivan Ivanov
15	DF	BUL	Petar Kepov
16	MF	BUL	Rosen Bogoev
17	FW	BUL	Asen Hristov
18	DF	BUL	Aleksandar Kostadinov
19	DF	BUL	Denis Angelov
33	GK	BUL	Atanas Tapigyozov
99	GK	BUL	Lyubomir Georgiev
—	FW	BUL	Stefan Spasov

=== League positions ===
- 2014, Vtora Liga
