= Blagoy Nakov =

Bulgarian footballer

Personal information
- Full name: Blagoy Stoyanov Nakov
- Date of birth: 19 March 1985 (age 41)
- Place of birth: Petrich, Bulgaria
- Height: 1.83 m (6 ft 0 in)
- Position: Midfielder

Team information
- Current team: Belasitsa Petrich
- Number: 24

Youth career
- Belasitsa Petrich

Senior career*
Years	Team	Apps	(Gls)
2003–2008	Belasitsa Petrich	49	(5)
2008–2010	Pirin Blagoevgrad	14	(1)
2010–2011	Vihren Sandanski	22	(6)
2011–2013	Bansko	46	(25)
2013–2014	Montana	23	(10)
2014	Lokomotiv Plovdiv	16	(2)
2015–2016	Pirin Blagoevgrad	22	(3)
2016	Septemvri Sofia	11	(0)
2017–2020	Belasitsa Petrich	0	(0)
- * Club domestic league appearances and goals as of 15 February 2017

Blagoy Nakov (Bulgarian: Благой Наков; born 19 March 1985) was a Bulgarian footballer. He played as a midfielder.

== Career ==
Nakov was raised in Belasitsa Petrich's youth teams. So far he has 49 games and 5 goals in the national championship. Nakov is a defensive midfielder, but can also play as a central defender.

In summer 2008 he signed a contract with Pirin Blagoevgrad. In his first season in Pirin, Nakov played 14 matches and scored one goal, on 20 September 2008 against OFC Sliven 2000.

In February 2017, Nakov joined Belasitsa Petrich.
