= PFK Svetkavitsa 1922 =

Bulgarian football club

Svetkavitsa
- Full name: Професионален футболен клуб „Светкавица 1922“ АД; Profesionalen futbolen klub Svetkavitsa 1922 AD
- Founded: 6 July 1922; 103 years ago 1 July 2013; 12 years ago /refounded/
- Ground: Stadion Dimitar Burkov, Targovishte
- Capacity: 8,000
- Owner: Tanyu Tanev
- Manager: Dimitar Pantev
- League: North-East Third League
- 2022–23: North-East Third League, 3rd
Home colours	Away colours

Profesionalen futbolen klub Svetkavitsa 1922 (Bulgarian: Професионален футболен клуб „Светкавица 1922“; English: Svetkavitsa 1922 Professional Football Club) is a Bulgarian football club based in Targovishte, which currently competes in Bulgaria's third tier, the North-East Third League. They play their home matches at the local Dimitar Burkov Stadium.

Svetkavitsa have competed in the second division for a record 49 seasons, playing more second-flight league games than any other Bulgarian team.

Svetkavitsa played in the top tier for the first time during season 2011–12. They were relegated after winning just one of their 30 games. In 2013, the club was dissolved due to financial problems, but it was refounded the same year. Since then, the club has been mostly competing in the third tier.

The name of the club, Svetkavitsa, means lightning in Bulgarian, which is reflected on the club emblem.

== History ==
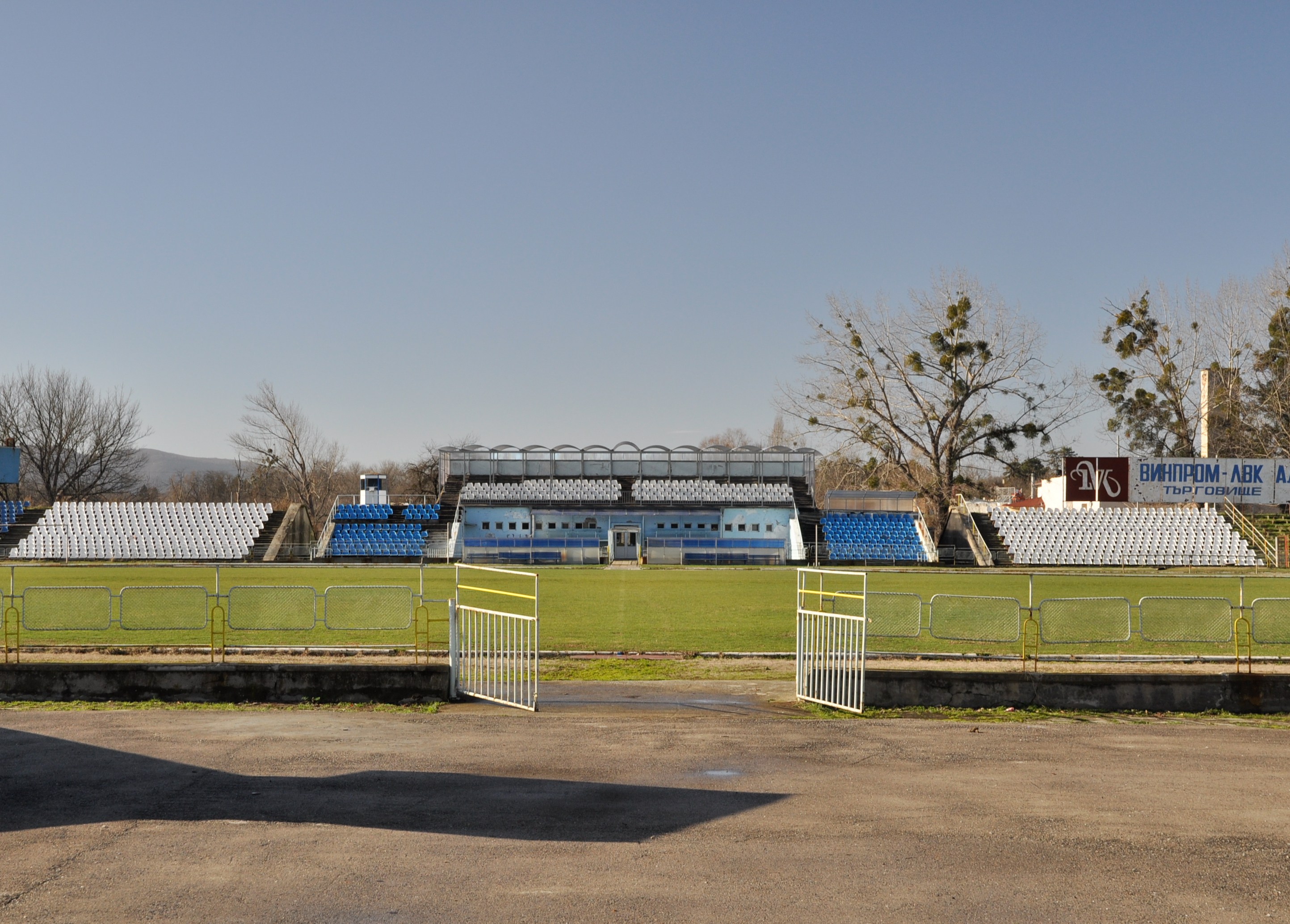
Dimitar Burkov Stadium

Svetkavitsa was founded on 6 July 1922 from a merger of Levski and Botev, two neighborhood teams in Targovishte and has played in its current home ground, Dimitar Burkov Stadium, since 1971. In the 1961–62 season, the club was promoted for the first time to the B PFG. Svetkavitsa's most notable achievement in the twentieth century came in 1974, when they finished runners-up in the second division. In 1987, the club's form dropped, and they were relegated to V AFG, after finishing last. Svetkavitsa regained second-flight status in 1989 after a two-year absence.

Svetkavitsa established itself as a consistent team in the B Group during the early 2000s. The team finished the 2010–11 season in fourth place in the B PFG, their highest finish in the league since 1973–74, and claimed a spot in the play-offs for promotion to A PFG. Their qualification for the playoffs came after some controversy, however. Originally, second-placed Pomorie qualified for the playoffs, but Pomorie was not given a license for the A Group, despite winning the playoff. On the other hand, third-placed Spartak Plovdiv was relegated to the third tier for financial problems, thus allowing Svetkavitsa to enter the playoffs. Svetkavitsa defeated Etar Veliko Tarnovo 3–1 on 17 June 2011, to earn promotion to the A PFG. This achievement meant Svetkavitsa made its debut appearance in the top league since the 1948 founding of the competition.

Svetkavitsa entered the A Group as clear outsiders and favorites for relegation, mainly because of the team's inexperience with top flight football, as well as the fact that Svetkavitsa wasn't supposed to play in the playoffs for the A Group in the first place. Expectations proved to be reality, as the team's first top-flight season ended poorly, with Svetkavitsa managing only one win, five draws, and 24 losses, marking one of the poorest performances for a team in the top tier. Their only win came against FC Kaliakra Kavarna. Svetkavitsa finished last and was relegated to the B Group.

The following season, the team finished in fourth place in the B Group, four points behind second-placed FC Lyubimets, who qualified for promotion. Before the 2013–14 season, the team decided to cancel their participation in the second league, for financial reasons. After the financial problems worsened, the team was dissolved in 2013, but refounded in 2014 starting from First Regional. The team promoted to the third league after one year, and has been playing there ever since.

== Current squad ==
As of 1 February 2020 Note: Flags indicate national team as defined under FIFA eligibility rules; some limited exceptions apply. Players may hold more than one non-FIFA nationality.

No.	Pos.	Nation	Player
1	GK	BUL	Todor Todorov
2	DF	BUL	Momchil Stoyanov
3	DF	BUL	Sevdalin Staykov
4	DF	BUL	Valentin Boyanov
5	DF	BUL	Daniel Genov
6	MF	BUL	Serkan Mustafov
7	MF	BUL	Dinko Stanchev
8	MF	BUL	Yordan Yordanov
9	FW	BUL	Kristiyan Arsovski
10	FW	BUL	Rumen Ruskov
11	MF	BUL	Rumen Kasabov

No.	Pos.	Nation	Player
12	GK	BUL	Dobromir Dobrev
13	MF	BUL	Mert Seidov
14	MF	BUL	Ivo Mihaylov
15	MF	BUL	Georgi Dimitrov
16	MF	BUL	Radoslav Stefanov
17	DF	BUL	Georgi Damyanov
18	MF	BUL	Yoan Rusev
19	MF	BUL	Mladen Mladenov
20	MF	BUL	Hasan Hasanov
21	DF	BUL	Georgi Shterev
22	MF	BUL	Yavor Todorov

== Notable players ==
Had international caps for their respective countries, held any club record, or had more than 100 league appearances. Players whose name is listed in bold represented their countries.

Bulgaria

- (Bulgaria) **Ivaylo Dimitrov**
- (Bulgaria) Plamen Donev
- (Bulgaria) Daniel Genov
- (Bulgaria) **Georgi Iliev**
- (Bulgaria) Tsvetan Iliev
- (Bulgaria) **Ismail Isa**
- (Bulgaria) Radoslav Komitov
- (Bulgaria) **Anton Nedyalkov**
- (Bulgaria) Rumen Stoyanov
- (Bulgaria) Neven Venkov

== Statistics and records ==
The club's record appearance maker is Boris Stoyanov, who made 544 appearances between his debut in 1962 and retirement in 1980. The club's record goalscorer is Dimo Valev, who scored 105 goals in 289 games between 1959 and 1973.

Rank	Name	Nat	Apps
1	Boris Stoyanov	(Bulgaria)	544
2	Miroslav Gospodinov	(Bulgaria)	383
3	Ivan Todorov	(Bulgaria)	365
4	Plamen Donev	(Bulgaria)	355

Rank	Name	Nat	Goals
1	Dimo Valev	(Bulgaria)	105
2	Andrey Andreev	(Bulgaria)	82
3	Petko Markov	(Bulgaria)	76
4	Nikolay Bachvarov	(Bulgaria)	62

Competitive matches only. As of 14 May 2013.

== Managers ==
- (Bulgaria) Plamen Donev (1996–2011)
- (Bulgaria) Nikola Spasov (2011)
- (Bulgaria) Alyosha Andonov (2011–2012)
- (Bulgaria) Georgi Ivanov (2012–2013)
- (Bulgaria) Miroslav Mironov (2013)

== Past seasons ==
Season	League	Place	W	D	L	GF	GA	Pts	Bulgarian Cup
2013–14	V AFG (III)	2	22	6	2	77	11	72	Did not qualify
2014–15	V AFG	8	14	3	13	42	44	45	Did not qualify
2015–16	V AFG	4	13	3	10	41	32	42	First round
2016–17	Third League	8	6	9	10	17	29	27	Did not qualify
2017–18	Third League	7	12	6	12	44	26	42	Did not qualify
**Green marks a season followed by promotion, red a season followed by relegation.**
