= 2017–18 Third Amateur Football League (Bulgaria) =

Third Amateur Football League
- Season: 2017–18
- Promoted: Dobrudzha Dobrich; FC Arda Kardzhali; FC Kariana Erden; FC CSKA 1948 Sofia
- Relegated: Benkovski Byala; Dorostol Silistra; Yambol; Rakovski; Vereya II; Tundzha Yagoda; Yantra 1919 Gabrovo; Miziya Knezha; Pirin Gotse Delchev; Elin Pelin

The 2017–18 Third Amateur Football League season is the 68th season of the Bulgarian Third Amateur Football League. The group is equivalent to the third level of the Bulgarian football pyramid with four divisions existing in it. The divisions themselves are geographically separated into North-West, North-East, South-East, and South-West, covering the football clubs of their respective zones. This is the second season after the reorganization of the Bulgarian football system, which saw the emergence of new competition formats, such as First and Second Professional Football Leagues.

== Team changes ==
=== To Third League ===
Promoted from Regional Divisions

- Benkovski Byala
- Spartak 1918
- Botev Lukovit
- Yantra 1919 Gabrovo
- Yantra Polski Trambesh
- Sokol Markovo
- Tundzha Yagoda
- CSKA 1948
- Elin Pelin

Relegated from Second League

- CSKA Sofia II^{a}
- Spartak Pleven
- Bansko
- Levski Karlovo

=== From Third League ===
Relegated to Regional Divisions

- Spartak Varna
- Inter Dobrich
- Kom Berkovitsa
- Juventus Malchika
- Lyubimets
- Elhovo
- Velbazhd Kyustendil
- Chepinets Velingrad

Promoted to Second League

- Chernomorets Balchik
- Maritsa Plovdiv
- Litex
- Strumska Slava Radomir

a.CSKA Sofia II officially declined to participate in the South-West Third League and was dissolved.

=== Club movements between Third League and Second League ===
The champions of three Third League divisions gained promotion to the 2017–18 Second League: Chernomorets Balchik from North-East, Litex from North-West and Strumska Slava Radomir from South-West. Maritsa Plovdiv joined the promoted teams as runners-up of the South-East group because champions Zagorets refused to participate for financial reasons. In return, four teams were relegated to the Third League: CSKA Sofia II, Spartak Pleven, Bansko and Levski Karlovo. CSKA Sofia II was dissolved; as a result, Svoboda Peshtera (16th in 2016–17 South-West Third League) was spared from relegation to regional divisions.

=== Club movements between Third League and the Regional Groups ===
- North-East: Spartak Varna and Inter Dobrich were relegated last season to regional divisions. The new teams, coming from the regional divisions, are Benkovski Byala (champions of RFG Ruse) and Spartak 1918 (runners-up of A2 RFG Varna). On 21 June 2017, Spartak Varna merged with Spartak 1918.
- North-West: Kom Berkovitsa and Juventus Malchika were relegated from last season to regional divisions. The new teams, coming from the regional divisions, are Botev Lukovit (9th in RFG Lovech), Yantra 1919 Gabrovo (runners-up of RFG Gabrovo) and Yantra Polski Trambesh (champions of A RFG Veliko Tarnovo).
- South-East: Lyubimets and Elhovo were relegated from last season to regional divisions. The new teams, coming from the regional divisions, are Sokol Markovo (runners-up of A RFG Plovdiv) and Tundzha Yagoda (runners-up of RFG Stara Zagora).
- South-West: Velbazhd Kyustendil and Chepinets Velingrad were relegated from last season to regional divisions. The new teams, coming from the regional divisions, are CSKA 1948 (champions of RFG Sofia (capital)) and Elin Pelin (champions of RFG Sofia (province)). Initially, Kyustendil (champions of RFG Kyustendil) was supposed to participate as winners of the promotion play-off. However, on 14 July 2017, Kyustendil withdrew from participation so the Bulgarian Football Union scheduled an additional play-off between the losers of the promotion play-offs. On 31 July, Bratsigovo refused participation so Elin Pelin was approved as new member of the South-West league.

== Northeast group ==
=== Stadia and locations ===
Location of teams in 2017–18 North-East Third League

North-East Third League
- Season: 2017–18
- Champions: Dobrudzha Dobrich
- Promoted: Dobrudzha Dobrich
- Relegated: Dorostol Silistra; Benkovski Byala
- Matches: 165
- Goals: 516 (3.13 per match)
- Top goalscorer: (Bulgaria) Lyubomir Mihalev (15 goals)
- Biggest home win: Dobrudzha Dobrich 9–0 Benkovski Byala (14 October 2017); Dobrudzha Dobrich 9–0 Botev Novi Pazar (16 May 2018)
- Biggest away win: Spartak 1918 1–7 Suvorovo (1 October 2017); Spartak 1918 0–6 Dobrudzha Dobrich (22 October 2017); Benkovski Byala 0–6 Suvorovo (25 February 2018); Botev Novi Pazar 0–6 Septemvri Tervel (14 April 2018)
- Highest scoring: Dobrudzha Dobrich 9–0 Benkovski Byala (14 October 2017); Dobrudzha Dobrich 9–0 Botev Novi Pazar (16 May 2018)
- All statistics correct as of 27 May 2018.

Team	City	Stadium	Capacity
Benkovski	Byala	Georgi Benkovski	3,000
Botev	Novi Pazar	Gradski	8,000
Dobrudzha	Dobrich	Druzhba	12,500
Dorostol	Silistra	Louis Eyer	12,000
Hitrino	Hitrino	Hitrino	600
Kaliakra	Kavarna	Kavarna	5,000
Kubrat	Kubrat	Gradski	6,000
Lokomotiv	Ruse	Dunav	19,960
Septemvri	Tervel	Septemvri	700
Spartak 1918	Varna	Lokomotiv	1,000
Suvorovo	Suvorovo	Suvorovo	1,000
Svetkavitsa	Targovishte	Dimitar Burkov	5,000

=== League table ===
Pos	Team	Pld	W	D	L	GF	GA	GD	Pts	Promotion or relegation
1	Dobrudzha Dobrich (C, P)	30	28	2	0	101	10	+91	86	Promotion to Second League
2	Suvorovo	30	20	4	6	81	21	+60	64	
3	Lokomotiv Ruse	30	15	6	9	49	31	+18	51 (Note: Lokomotiv Ruse ahead of Hitrino on head-to-head record; Lokomotiv Ruse–Hitrino 1–1, Hitrino–Lokomotiv Ruse 1–1, Lokomotiv Ruse with better goal difference.)	
4	Hitrino	30	14	9	7	43	36	+7	51	
5	Septemvri Tervel	30	14	4	12	48	49	−1	46	
6	Kaliakra Kavarna	30	12	6	12	40	43	−3	42 (Note: Kaliakra Kavarna ahead of Svetkavitsa Targovishte on head-to-head record; Kaliakra Kavarna–Svetkavitsa Targovishte 1–0, Svetkavitsa Targovishte–Kaliakra Kavarna 1–1.)	
7	Svetkavitsa Targovishte	30	12	6	12	44	26	+18	42	
8	Spartak 1918	30	10	6	14	43	61	−18	36	
9	Botev Novi Pazar	30	6	3	21	25	78	−53	21	
10	Kubrat	30	4	5	21	22	61	−39	17	
11	Benkovski Byala (R)	30	3	3	24	20	100	−80	12	Relegation to Regional Divisions
12	Dorostol Silistra (Note: Dorostol Silistra postponed their first match but failed to register any players after the first few rounds and subsequently were expelled in September. All fixtures involving the team were annulled.) (D, R)	0	0	0	0	0	0	0	0	Relegation to Regional Divisions

Source: bulgarian-football.com, Soccerway
Rules for classification: 1) Points; 2) Head-to-head points; 3) Head-to-head goal difference; 4) Head-to-head goals scored; 5) Head-to-head away goals scored (only if two teams); 6) Goal difference; 7) Goals scored; 8) Fairplay ranking; 9) Draw.
(C) Champions; (D) Disqualified; (P) Promoted; (R) Relegated

== Southeast group ==
=== Stadia and locations ===
Location of teams in 2017–18 South-East Third League

South-East Third League
- Season: 2017–18
- Champions: Arda Kardzhali
- Promoted: Arda Kardzhali
- Relegated: Tundzha Yagoda; Vereya II; Rakovski; Yambol
- Matches: 306
- Goals: 1,045 (3.42 per match)
- Top goalscorer: (Bulgaria) Dimitar Aleksiev (26 goals)
- Biggest home win: Arda 11–1 Svilengrad (24 February 2018)
- Biggest away win: Tundzha Yagoda 0–12 Arda (14 March 2018)
- Highest scoring: Arda 11–1 Svilengrad (24 February 2018); Tundzha Yagoda 0–12 Arda (14 March 2018)
- All statistics correct as of 26 May 2018.

Team	City	Stadium	Capacity
Arda	Kardzhali	Druzhba Stadium, Kardzhali	15,000
Asenovets	Asenovgrad	Shipka	4,000
Atletik	Kuklen	Atletik	1,000
Borislav	Parvomay	Gradski	8,000
Dimitrovgrad	Dimitrovgrad	Minyor	10,000
Eurocollege	Plovdiv	Eurocollege Sport Complex, Orizari	1,000
Gigant	Saedinenie	Saedinenie	5,000
Karnobat	Karnobat	Gradski	3,000
Levski	Karlovo	Vasil Levski	3,000
Minyor	Radnevo	Minyor	2,000
Rakovski	Rakovski	Franz Kokov	3,000
Rozova Dolina	Kazanlak	Sevtopolis	15,000
Sokol	Markovo	Sokol	2,500
Svilengrad	Svilengrad	Kolodruma	1,750
Tundzha	Yagoda	Yagoda	300
Vereya II	Stara Zagora	Trace Arena	3,000
FC Yambol	Yambol	Tundzha	18,000
Zagorets	Nova Zagora	Zagorets	5,900

=== League table ===
Pos	Team	Pld	W	D	L	GF	GA	GD	Pts	Promotion or relegation
1	Arda Kardzhali (C, P)	34	30	4	0	142	7	+135	94	Promotion to Second League
2	Zagorets	34	22	5	7	67	27	+40	71	
3	Minyor Radnevo	34	17	8	9	63	34	+29	59	
4	Rozova Dolina	34	17	6	11	64	41	+23	57	
5	Atletik Kuklen	34	17	5	12	55	51	+4	56	
6	Sokol Markovo	34	16	5	13	63	49	+14	53	
7	Karnobat	34	16	4	14	65	50	+15	52	
8	Levski Karlovo	34	16	3	15	51	58	−7	51	
9	Borislav Parvomay	34	15	5	14	65	62	+3	50	
10	Asenovets Asenovgrad	34	14	7	13	53	55	−2	49	
11	Dimitrovgrad	34	15	3	16	46	62	−16	48	
12	Svilengrad	34	13	4	17	52	89	−37	43 (Note: Svilengrad ahead of Gigant Saedinenie on head-to-head record; Svilengrad–Gigant Saedinenie 3–1, Gigant Saedinenie–Svilengrad 1–1.)	
13	Gigant Saedinenie	34	12	7	15	33	53	−20	43	
14	Eurocollege	34	12	6	16	63	71	−8	42	
15	Yambol (Note: Uragan Boyadzhik moved to Yambol and was renamed as FC Yambol.) (R)	34	11	5	18	62	59	+3	38	Relegation to Regional Divisions
16	Rakovski (R)	34	11	2	21	44	65	−21	35	Relegation to Regional Divisions
17	Vereya II (R)	34	10	3	21	45	88	−43	33	Relegation to Regional Divisions
18	Tundzha Yagoda (Note: On March 24, 2018, Tundzha Yagoda notified the BFU that they will be suspending their participation in the South-East division. The team's results until that point were kept, and all fixtures until the end of the season would result in a 3–0 win for their opponents.) (D, R)	34	0	2	32	15	127	−112	2	Relegation to Regional Divisions

Source: bulgarian-football.com, Soccerway
Rules for classification: 1) Points; 2) Head-to-head points; 3) Head-to-head goal difference; 4) Head-to-head goals scored; 5) Head-to-head away goals scored (only if two teams); 6) Goal difference; 7) Goals scored; 8) Fairplay ranking; 9) Draw.
(C) Champions; (D) Disqualified; (P) Promoted; (R) Relegated

== Northwest group ==
=== Stadia and locations ===
Location of teams in 2017–18 North-West Third League

North-West Third League
- Season: 2017–18
- Champions: Kariana
- Promoted: Kariana
- Relegated: Miziya Knezha; Yantra 1919 Gabrovo
- Matches: 240
- Goals: 741 (3.09 per match)
- Biggest home win: Kariana 9–0 Tryavna (1 April 2018)
- Biggest away win: Yantra 1919 Gabrovo 0–5 Akademik Svishtov (17 September 2017); Pavlikeni 1–6 Kariana (10 April 2018); Botev Lukovit 0–5 Kariana (5 May 2018)
- Highest scoring: Kariana 9–0 Tryavna (1 April 2018)
- All statistics correct as of 27 May 2018.

Team	City	Stadium	Capacity
Akademik	Svishtov	Akademik	13,500
Bdin	Vidin	Georgi Benkovski	15,000
Botev	Lukovit	Gradski	3,000
Kariana	Erden	Kariana Sport Complex	1,000
Levski	Levski	Levski	6,000
Miziya	Knezha	Gradski	1,000
Partizan	Cherven Bryag	Gradski	700
Parva Atomna	Kozloduy	Hristo Botev	3,000
Pavlikeni	Pavlikeni	Gancho Panov	10,000
Sevlievo	Sevlievo	Rakovski	5,000
Spartak	Pleven	Pleven	22,000
Tryavna	Tryavna	Gradski	3,000
Vihar	Slavyanovo	Gradski	1,000
Yantra 1919 Gabrovo	Gabrovo	Hristo Botev	14,000
Yantra Gabrovo	Gabrovo	Hristo Botev	14,000
Yantra Polski Trambesh	Polski Trambesh	Gradski	800

=== League table ===
Pos	Team	Pld	W	D	L	GF	GA	GD	Pts	Promotion or relegation
1	Kariana (C, P)	30	25	5	0	100	19	+81	80	Promotion to Second League
2	Sevlievo	30	20	4	6	60	27	+33	64	
3	Vihar Slavyanovo	30	17	7	6	68	32	+36	58	
4	Bdin Vidin	30	16	5	9	57	33	+24	53	
5	Parva Atomna	30	15	7	8	45	29	+16	52	
6	Levski	30	13	7	10	42	40	+2	46	
7	Yantra Gabrovo	30	13	4	13	60	39	+21	43	
8	Spartak Pleven	30	10	9	11	39	46	−7	39	
9	Partizan Cherven Bryag	30	11	4	15	34	50	−16	37 (Note: Partizan Cherven Bryag ahead of Akademik Svishtov on head-to-head record; Partizan Cherven Bryag–Akademik Svishtov 2–0, Akademik Svishtov–Partizan Cherven Bryag 2–1.)	
10	Akademik Svishtov	30	9	10	11	45	46	−1	37	
11	Tryavna	30	10	6	14	33	47	−14	36	
12	Pavlikeni	30	10	2	18	34	62	−28	32	
13	Botev Lukovit	30	9	3	18	37	64	−27	30	
14	Yantra Polski Trambesh	30	7	5	18	37	61	−24	26	
15	Yantra 1919 Gabrovo (R)	30	7	2	21	26	71	−45	23	Relegation to Regional Divisions
16	Miziya Knezha (R)	30	6	4	20	24	75	−51	22	Relegation to Regional Divisions

Source: bulgarian-football.com, Soccerway
Rules for classification: 1) Points; 2) Head-to-head points; 3) Head-to-head goal difference; 4) Head-to-head goals scored; 5) Head-to-head away goals scored (only if two teams); 6) Goal difference; 7) Goals scored; 8) Fairplay ranking; 9) Draw.
(C) Champions; (P) Promoted; (R) Relegated

== Southwest group ==
=== Stadia and locations ===
Location of teams in 2017–18 South-West Third League

South-West Third League
- Season: 2017–18
- Champions: CSKA 1948
- Promoted: CSKA 1948
- Relegated: Elin Pelin; Pirin Gotse Delchev
- Matches: 306
- Goals: 878 (2.87 per match)
- Top goalscorer: (Bulgaria) Petko Petkov (23 goals)
- Biggest home win: Belasitsa Petrich 7–0 Pirin Gotse Delchev (10 March 2018); CSKA 1948 7–0 Svoboda Peshtera (14 March 2018); CSKA 1948 7–0 Marek (4 April 2018)
- Biggest away win: Germanea 0–5 Chavdar Etropole (27 September 2017)
- Highest scoring: Elin Pelin 3–5 Slivnishki Geroy (2 September 2017); Balkan Botevgrad 6–2 Svoboda Peshtera (30 September 2017); Bansko 6–2 Balkan Botevgrad (18 November 2017); CSKA 1948 7–1 Germanea (19 May 2018)
- All statistics correct as of 26 May 2018.

Team	City	Stadium	Capacity
Balkan	Botevgrad	Hristo Botev	8,000
Bansko	Bansko	Saint Peter	3,000
Belasitsa	Petrich	Kolarovo, Kolarovo	500
Botev	Ihtiman	Hristo Botev	5,000
Chavdar	Etropole	Chavdar	5,600
CSKA 1948	Sofia	Obelya	700
Elin Pelin	Elin Pelin	Elin Pelin	5,000
Germanea	Sapareva Banya	Sapareva Banya	500
Hebar	Pazardzhik	Georgi Benkovski	13,128
Marek	Dupnitsa	Bonchuk	8,050
Minyor	Pernik	Minyor	8,000
Pirin Gotse Delchev	Gotse Delchev	Gradski	5,000
Pirin Razlog	Razlog	Gradski	6,500
Rilski Sportist	Samokov	Iskar	7,000
Septemvri	Simitli	Struma	8,000
Slivnishki Geroy	Slivnitsa	Slivnishki Geroy	7,000
Svoboda	Peshtera	Gradski	3,500
Vihren	Sandanski	Sandanski	6,000

=== League table ===
Pos	Team	Pld	W	D	L	GF	GA	GD	Pts	Promotion or relegation
1	CSKA 1948 (C, P)	34	29	5	0	95	16	+79	92	Promotion to Second League
2	Hebar Pazardzhik	34	27	3	4	72	24	+48	84	
3	Vihren Sandanski	34	19	5	10	70	49	+21	62	
4	Minyor Pernik	34	16	6	12	53	42	+11	54	
5	Bansko	34	14	11	9	48	34	+14	53	
6	Chavdar Etropole	34	14	10	10	63	49	+14	52	
7	Septemvri Simitli	34	14	8	12	46	37	+9	50	
8	Slivnishki Geroy	34	12	10	12	50	41	+9	46	
9	Belasitsa Petrich	34	11	9	14	40	46	−6	42	
10	Balkan Botevgrad	34	10	11	13	49	60	−11	41	
11	Botev Ihtiman	34	12	4	18	41	64	−23	40	
12	Svoboda Peshtera	34	10	8	16	36	58	−22	38 (Note: Svoboda Peshtera ahead of Pirin Razlog on head-to-head record; Svoboda Peshtera–Pirin Razlog 1–1, Pirin Razlog–Svoboda Peshtera 1–2.)	
13	Pirin Razlog	34	10	8	16	40	40	0	38	
14	Marek Dupnitsa	34	10	7	17	35	48	−13	37	
15	Rilski Sportist	34	10	6	18	40	51	−11	36	
16	Germanea	34	9	8	17	38	63	−25	35	
17	Pirin Gotse Delchev (R)	34	8	8	18	27	66	−39	32	Relegation to Regional Divisions
18	Elin Pelin (R)	34	6	3	25	34	89	−55	21	Relegation to Regional Divisions

Source: bulgarian-football.com, Soccerway
Rules for classification: 1) Points; 2) Head-to-head points; 3) Head-to-head goal difference; 4) Head-to-head goals scored; 5) Head-to-head away goals scored (only if two teams); 6) Goal difference; 7) Goals scored; 8) Fairplay ranking; 9) Draw.
(C) Champions; (P) Promoted; (R) Relegated
