= 2016–17 Third Amateur Football League (Bulgaria) =

Third Amateur Football League
- Season: 2016–17
- Promoted: FC Chernomorets Balchik, FC Maritsa Plovdiv, PFC Litex Lovech, FC Strumska Slava Radomir

The 2016–17 Third Amateur Football League season was the 67th season of the Bulgarian Third Amateur Football League. The league is equivalent to the third level of the Bulgarian football pyramid, with a total of four divisions within it. The divisions themselves are geographically separated into Northwest, Northeast, Southeast, and Southwest. This was the first season following the 2016 reorganization of the Bulgarian football league system, which saw the emergence of new a competition format, including the First and Second Professional Football Leagues.

== Changes from the 2015–16 season ==
=== Club Movements Between V Group and B Group ===
The champions of the four 2015–16 V AFG divisions gained promotion to the 2016–17 Second League: Chernomorets Balchik from V AFG Northeast and Nesebar from V AFG Southeast, Etar Veliko Tarnovo from V AFG Northwest and CSKA Sofia from V AFG Southwest. Chernomorets Balchik refused to participate for financial reasons, while CSKA Sofia was invited by the Bulgarian Football Union directly to the newly formed First League.

In return, four teams were relegated to the Third League: Dobrudzha Dobrich, Septemvri Simitli, Lokomotiv Mezdra and Litex Lovech II.

=== Club Movements Between V Group and the Regional Groups ===
- Northeast: Ticha Dolni Chiflik and Dve Mogili were relegated last season to regional divisions. Benkovski Byala, Himik Devnya and Shumen did not apply for participation. Dobrudzha Dobrich was relegated from B Group. Marisan Ruse merged with Ruse into Lokomotiv Ruse, while Inter Plachidol moved to Dobrich. The new clubs promoted from the regional divisions were Spartak Varna, Dorostol Silistra and Hitrino.
- Northwest: Yantra Gabrovo, Botev Kozloduy and Gigant Belene were relegated from last season to regional divisions. Lokomotiv Mezdra, relegated from B Group last season, was not granted permission to participate due to unpaid dues to the Bulgarian Football Union. The new clubs promoted from the regional divisions were Miziya Knezha and Kom Berkovitsa. Dunav 98 Selanovtsi merged with Botev Kozloduy into Parva Atomna Kozloduy, while Botev Lukovit merged with Litex Lovech into Litex Lovech.
- Southeast: Chernomorets Burgas and Sliven were relegated from last season to regional divisions, while Spartak Plovdiv resigned shortly before the start of the season. Levski Karlovo joined the Second League. The new clubs promoted from the regional divisions were Atletik Kuklen, Arda Kardzhali, Vereya II, Elhovo and Lyubimets. The latter took the place of Spartak Plovdiv.
- Southwest: Balkan Varvara and Lokomotiv Sofia relegated from last season to regional divisions. Vitosha Bistritsa and Septemvri Sofia joined the Second League. Furthermore, Sofia 2010 merged into Tsarsko Selo and also joined the Second League. Septemvri Simitli was relegated from B Group. The new clubs promoted from the regional divisions were Chavdar Etropole, Hebar Pazardzhik, Marek Dupnitsa, Svoboda Peshtera and Balkan Botevgrad. Malesh Mikrevo merged with Pirin Razlog to form Pirin Razlog (11th in B Group last season and subsequently merged with Septemvri Sofia); Chiko Byaga merged with Hebar Pazardzhik into Hebar Pazardzhik, and Pravets merged with Chavdar Etropole into Chavdar Etropole.

== Northeast group ==
=== Stadia and locations ===
Location of teams in 2016–17 Northeast Third League

Northeast Third League
- Season: 2016–17
- Champions: Chernomorets Balchik
- Promoted: Chernomorets Balchik
- Relegated: Spartak Varna; Inter Dobrich
- Biggest home win: Spartak Varna 7–0 Dorostol (8 October 2016); Dobrudzha Dobrich 7–0 Kubrat (11 March 2017)
- Biggest away win: Botev Novi Pazar 0−5 Suvorovo (26 October 2016)
- Highest scoring: Dorostol 5–2 Hitrino (27 August 2016); Spartak Varna 7–0 Dorostol (8 October 2016); Lokomotiv Ruse 5–2 Kubrat (20 November 2016); Dobrudzha Dobrich 7–0 Kubrat (11 March 2017)

Team	City	Stadium	Capacity
Botev Novi Pazar	Novi Pazar	Gradski	8,000
Chernomorets Balchik	Balchik	Gradski	3,100
Dobrudzha Dobrich	Dobrich	Druzhba	12,500
Dorostol Silistra	Silistra	Louis Eyer	12,000
Hitrino	Hitrino	Hitrino	
Inter Dobrich	Dobrich	Druzhba (artificial ground)	
Kaliakra Kavarna	Kavarna	Kavarna	5,000
Kubrat	Kubrat	Gradski	6,000
Lokomotiv Ruse	Ruse	Dunav	19,960
Spartak Varna	Varna	Lokomotiv	1,000
Suvorovo	Suvorovo	Suvorovo	1,000
Svetkavitsa Targovishte	Targovishte	Dimitar Burkov	5,000
Septemvri Tervel	Tervel	Septemvri	700

=== Regular season ===
Pos	Team	Pld	W	D	L	GF	GA	GD	Pts	Qualification or relegation
1	Chernomorets Balchik	22	19	3	0	49	7	+42	60	Qualification to Championship round
2	Dobrudzha Dobrich	22	17	4	1	55	8	+47	55	Qualification to Championship round
3	Suvorovo	22	12	3	7	41	20	+21	39	Qualification to Championship round
4	Kaliakra Kavarna	22	11	3	8	33	24	+9	36	Qualification to Championship round
5	Botev Novi Pazar	22	11	1	10	21	37	−16	34	Qualification to Championship round
6	Septemvri Tervel	22	7	7	8	21	25	−4	28	Qualification to Championship round
7	Lokomotiv Ruse (Note: Marisan Ruse merged with Ruse into Lokomotiv Ruse on 23 June 2016.)	22	6	9	7	28	24	+4	27	Qualification to Championship round
8	Svetkavitsa Targovishte	22	5	8	9	15	28	−13	23	Qualification to Relegation round
9	Kubrat	22	6	4	12	21	39	−18	22	Qualification to Relegation round
10	Hitrino	22	6	2	14	18	32	−14	20	Qualification to Relegation round
11	Dorostol Silistra	22	4	3	15	15	43	−28	15	Qualification to Relegation round
12	Spartak Varna (Note: On 19 December 2016, Spartak Varna were deducted 3 points for non-attendance of their game against Chernomorets Balchik. On 22 February 2017, following non-attendance of their game against Kubrat, Spartak Varna were expelled from the league. All remaining fixtures are awarded 0–3 against them.) (D, R)	22	4	1	17	21	51	−30	10	Relegation to Regional Divions
13	Inter Dobrich (Note: Inter Plachidol moved to Dobrich on 17 June 2016.) (D, R)	0	0	0	0	0	0	0	0 (Note: On 10 October 2016, Inter Dobrich resigned from participation, according to the club as a manner of protest against inadequate punishment of their player. All fixtures involving the team were annulled.)	Relegation to Regional Divions

Source: bulgarian-football.com, Soccerway
Rules for classification: 1) Points; 2) Head-to-head points; 3) Head-to-head goal difference; 4) Head-to-head goals scored; 5) Head-to-head away goals scored (only if two teams); 6) Goal difference; 7) Goals scored; 8) Fairplay ranking; 9) Draw.
(D) Disqualified; (R) Relegated

=== Championship round ===
Pos	Team	Pld	W	D	L	GF	GA	GD	Pts	Promotion
1	Chernomorets Balchik (C, P)	28	24	4	0	67	9	+58	76	Promotion to Second League
2	Dobrudzha Dobrich	28	20	6	2	69	13	+56	66	
3	Suvorovo	28	16	4	8	51	28	+23	52	
4	Kaliakra Kavarna	28	12	4	12	42	38	+4	40	
5	Botev Novi Pazar	28	12	1	15	23	51	−28	37	
6	Lokomotiv Ruse	28	8	11	9	32	30	+2	35	
7	Septemvri Tervel	28	8	8	12	26	38	−12	32	

Source: bulgarian-football.com, Soccerway
Rules for classification: 1) Points; 2) Head-to-head points; 3) Head-to-head goal difference; 4) Head-to-head goals scored; 5) Head-to-head away goals scored (only if two teams); 6) Goal difference; 7) Goals scored; 8) Fairplay ranking; 9) Draw.
(C) Champions; (P) Promoted

=== Relegation round ===
Pos	Team	Pld	W	D	L	GF	GA	GD	Pts
1	Svetkavitsa Targovishte	25	6	9	10	17	29	−12	27
2	Kubrat	25	6	7	12	24	42	−18	25
3	Hitrino	25	6	4	15	20	36	−16	22
4	Dorostol Silistra	25	5	5	15	17	44	−27	20

Source: bulgarian-football.com, Soccerway
Rules for classification: 1) Points; 2) Head-to-head points; 3) Head-to-head goal difference; 4) Head-to-head goals scored; 5) Head-to-head away goals scored (only if two teams); 6) Goal difference; 7) Goals scored; 8) Fairplay ranking; 9) Draw.

== Southeast group ==
=== Stadia and locations ===
Location of teams in 2016–17 Southeast Third League

Southeast Third League
- Season: 2016–17
- Champions: Zagorets
- Promoted: Maritsa Plovdiv
- Relegated: Lyubimets; Elhovo
- Top goalscorer: Ventsislav Gyuzelev (31)
- Biggest home win: Uragan Boyadzhik 11–1 Rakovski (22 April 2017)
- Biggest away win: Lyubimets 0–7 Zagorets (20 May 2017)
- Highest scoring: Uragan Boyadzhik 11–1 Rakovski (22 April 2017)

Team	City	Stadium	Capacity
Arda	Kardzhali	Perperek Stadium, Perperek	420
Asenovets	Asenovgrad	Shipka	4,000
Atletik	Kuklen	Atletik	1,000
Borislav	Parvomay	Gradski	8,000
Dimitrovgrad	Dimitrovgrad	Minyor	10,000
Elhovo	Elhovo	Stefan Karadzha	
Eurocollege	Plovdiv	Eurocollege Sport Complex, Orizari	
Gigant	Saedinenie	Saedinenie	5,000
Karnobat	Karnobat	Gradski	3,000
Lyubimets	Lyubimets	Gradski	4,000
Maritsa	Plovdiv	Maritsa	8,000
Minyor	Radnevo	Minyor	2,000
Rakovski	Rakovski	Franz Kokov	3,000
Rozova Dolina	Kazanlak	Sevtopolis	15,000
Svilengrad	Svilengrad	Kolodruma	1,750
Uragan	Boyadzhik	Madaba Stadium, Kabile	
Vereya II	Stara Zagora	Trace Arena	3,000
Zagorets	Nova Zagora	Zagorets	5,900

=== League table ===
Pos	Team	Pld	W	D	L	GF	GA	GD	Pts	Promotion or relegation
1	Zagorets Nova Zagora (Note: Zagorets declined promotion due to financial and organizational reasons; runners-up Maritsa Plovdiv took their place.) (C)	34	26	6	2	77	13	+64	84	
2	Maritsa Plovdiv (P)	34	26	0	8	95	25	+70	78	Promotion to Second League
3	Karnobat	34	23	4	7	79	35	+44	73	
4	Rozova Dolina Kazanlak	34	20	4	10	69	38	+31	64	
5	Atletik Kuklen	34	15	8	11	58	44	+14	53	
6	Borislav Parvomay	34	14	8	12	60	48	+12	50	
7	Eurocollege Plovdiv	34	14	4	16	64	65	−1	46	
8	Uragan Boyadzhik	34	13	6	15	55	66	−11	45	
9	Asenovets Asenovgrad	34	13	5	16	50	56	−6	44	
10	Dimitrovgrad	34	12	7	15	35	39	−4	43	
11	Vereya II	34	12	5	17	66	76	−10	41 (Note: Vereya II ahead of Gigant Saedinenie and Svilengrad on head-to-head record; Vereya II 8 pts, Gigant Saedinenie 5 pts, Svilengrad 2 pts.)	
12	Gigant Saedinenie	34	12	5	17	51	71	−20	41	
13	Svilengrad	34	11	8	15	41	52	−11	41	
14	Rakovski	34	11	7	16	52	81	−29	40	
15	Minyor Radnevo	34	11	6	17	39	58	−19	39 (Note: Minyor Radnevo ahead of Arda Kardzhali on head-to-head record; Arda Kardzhali–Minyor Radnevo 3–1, Minyor Radnevo–Arda Kardzhali 2–0.)	
16	Arda Kardzhali	34	11	6	17	49	69	−20	39	
17	Lyubimets (Note: Lyubimets took the place of Spartak Plovdiv after the latter declared its withdrawal on 11 August 2016.) (R)	34	9	6	19	38	79	−41	33	Relegation to Regional Divisions
18	Elhovo (R)	34	4	3	27	27	90	−63	15	Relegation to Regional Divisions

Source: bulgarian-football.com, Soccerway
Rules for classification: 1) Points; 2) Head-to-head points; 3) Head-to-head goal difference; 4) Head-to-head goals scored; 5) Head-to-head away goals scored (only if two teams); 6) Goal difference; 7) Goals scored; 8) Fairplay ranking; 9) Draw.
(C) Champions; (P) Promoted; (R) Relegated

== Northwest group ==
=== Stadia and locations ===
Location of teams in 2016–17 Northwest Third League

Northwest Third League
- Season: 2016–17
- Champions: Litex
- Promoted: Litex
- Relegated: Kom Berkovitsa; Juventus Malchika
- Top goalscorer: Rumen Rangelov (24)
- Biggest home win: Sevlievo 11–0 Kom Berkovitsa (12 March 2017)
- Biggest away win: Kom Berkovitsa 0–10 Bdin Vidin (28 May 2017)
- Highest scoring: Kariana 11–3 Yantra Gabrovo (23 April 2017)

Team	City	Stadium	Capacity
Bdin Vidin	Vidin	Georgi Benkovski	15,000
Kariana Erden	Erden	Kariana Sport Complex	1,000
Miziya Knezha	Knezha	Gradski	1,000
Kom Berkovitsa	Berkovitsa	Mramor	3,000
Levski	Levski	Levski	6,000
Litex Lovech	Lovech	Gradski	8,100
Juventus Malchika	Malchika	Georgi Karchev	1,000
Partizan Cherven Bryag	Cherven Bryag	Gradski	700
Parva Atomna Kozloduy	Kozloduy	Hristo Botev	3,000
Pavlikeni	Pavlikeni	Gancho Panov	10,000
Sevlievo	Sevlievo	Rakovski	5,000
Vihar Slavyanovo	Slavyanovo	Gradski	1,000
Akademik Svishtov	Svishtov	Akademik	13,500
Tryavna	Tryavna	Gradski	3,000
Yantra Gabrovo	Gabrovo	Hristo Botev	14,000

=== League table ===
Pos	Team	Pld	W	D	L	GF	GA	GD	Pts	Promotion or relegation
1	Litex Lovech (Note: Botev Lukovit merges with reestablished Litex Lovech into Litex Lovech.) (C, P)	28	25	2	1	114	9	+105	77	Promotion to Second League
2	Kariana Erden	28	21	4	3	90	18	+72	67	
3	Sevlievo	28	18	4	6	69	33	+36	58	
4	Levski	28	17	4	7	50	26	+24	55	
5	Bdin Vidin	28	16	4	8	82	33	+49	52	
6	Vihar Slavyanovo	28	15	5	8	70	29	+41	50	
7	Akademik Svishtov	28	11	5	12	43	41	+2	38	
8	Parva Atomna Kozloduy (Note: Dunav 98 (Selanovci) merges with Botev Kozloduy into Parva Atomna.)	28	10	5	13	43	56	−13	35	
9	Pavlikeni	28	10	4	14	42	49	−7	34 (Note: Pavlikeni ahead of Yantra Gabrovo on head-to-head record; Yantra Gabrovo–Pavlikeni 0–1, Pavlikeni–Yantra Gabrovo 1–1.)	
10	Yantra Gabrovo	28	10	4	14	49	61	−12	34	
11	Tryavna	28	8	7	13	35	50	−15	31 (Note: Tryavna ahead of Miziya Knezha on head-to-head record; Miziya Knezha–Tryavna 1–1, Tryavna–Miziya Knezha 0–0.)	
12	Miziya Knezha	28	7	10	11	38	59	−21	31	
13	Partizan Cherven Bryag	28	6	5	17	23	72	−49	23	
14	Kom Berkovitsa (R)	28	2	1	25	20	140	−120	7	Relegation to Regional Divisions
15	Juventus Malchika (R)	28	1	2	25	18	110	−92	5	Relegation to Regional Divisions

Source: bulgarian-football.com, Soccerway
Rules for classification: 1) Points; 2) Head-to-head points; 3) Head-to-head goal difference; 4) Head-to-head goals scored; 5) Head-to-head away goals scored (only if two teams); 6) Goal difference; 7) Goals scored; 8) Fairplay ranking; 9) Draw.
(C) Champions; (P) Promoted; (R) Relegated

== Southwest group ==
=== Stadia and locations ===
Location of teams in 2016–17 Southwest Third League

Southwest Third League
- Season: 2016–17
- Champions: Strumska Slava Radomir
- Promoted: Strumska Slava Radomir
- Relegated: Velbazhd Kyustendil; Chepinets Velingrad
- Top goalscorer: Tsvetelin Tsakovski (29)
- Biggest home win: Germanea 11–1 Chepinets Velingrad (21 August 2016)
- Biggest away win: Chepinets Velingrad 0–8 Pirin Gotse Delchev (9 November 2016)
- Highest scoring: Germanea 11–1 Chepinets Velingrad (21 August 2016)

Team	City	Stadium	Capacity
Balkan Botevgrad	Botevgrad	Hristo Botev	8,000
Belasitsa Petrich	Petrich	Kolarovo, Kolarovo	
Botev Ihtiman	Ihtiman	Hristo Botev	5,000
Chavdar Etropole	Etropole	Chavdar	5,600
Chepinets Velingrad	Velingrad	Chepinets	8,000
Germanea Sapareva Banya	Sapareva Banya	Sapareva Banya	500
Hebar Pazardzhik	Pazardzhik	Georgi Benkovski	13,128
Marek Dupnitsa	Dupnitsa	Bonchuk	8,050
Minyor Pernik	Pernik	Minyor	8,000
Pirin Gotse Delchev	Gotse Delchev	Gradski	5,000
Pirin Razlog	Razlog	Gradski	6,500
Rilski Sportist Samokov	Samokov	Iskar	7,000
Septemvri Simitli	Simitli	Struma	8,000
Slivnishki Geroy	Slivnitsa	Slivnishki Geroy	7,000
Strumska Slava	Radomir	Gradski	5,000
Svoboda Peshtera	Peshtera	Gradski	3,500
Velbazhd Kyustendil	Kyustendil	Osogovo	13,000
Vihren Sandanski	Sandanski	Sandanski	6,000

=== League table ===
Pos	Team	Pld	W	D	L	GF	GA	GD	Pts	Promotion or relegation
1	Strumska Slava (C, P)	34	23	9	2	76	20	+56	78	Promotion to Second League
2	Septemvri Simitli	34	21	9	4	62	28	+34	72	
3	Minyor Pernik	34	20	8	6	58	37	+21	68	
4	Slivnishki Geroy	34	19	2	13	69	39	+30	59 (Note: Slivnishki Geroy ahead of Belasitsa Petrich on head-to-head record; Belasitsa Petrich–Slivnishki Geroy 1–0, Slivnishki Geroy–Belasitsa Petrich 2–0.)	
5	Belasitsa Petrich	34	16	11	7	52	34	+18	59	
6	Hebar Pazardzhik (Note: Chiko Byaga merges with Hebar Pazardzhik into Hebar Pazardzhik.)	34	18	4	12	68	41	+27	58	
7	Chavdar Etropole (Note: Pravets merges with reestablished Chavdar Etropole into Chavdar Etropole.)	34	17	2	15	60	46	+14	53	
8	Marek Dupnitsa	34	15	7	12	51	50	+1	52	
9	Rilski Sportist Samokov	34	12	7	15	53	61	−8	43	
10	Pirin Gotse Delchev	34	12	6	16	45	41	+4	42	
11	Pirin Razlog (Note: Malesh Mikrevo merges with reestablished Pirin Razlog into Pirin Razlog.)	34	11	8	15	36	55	−19	41	
12	Balkan Botevgrad	34	11	7	16	54	55	−1	40	
13	Botev Ihtiman	34	12	2	20	49	72	−23	38 (Note: Botev Ihtiman ahead of Germanea Sapareva Banya on head-to-head record; Germanea Sapareva Banya–Botev Ihtiman 1–3, Botev Ihtiman–Germanea Sapareva Banya 1–0.)	
14	Germanea Sapareva Banya	34	11	5	18	52	52	0	38	
15	Vihren Sandanski	34	10	7	17	36	46	−10	37 (Note: Vihren Sandanski ahead of Svoboda Peshtera on head-to-head record; Svoboda Peshtera–Vihren Sandanski 1–6, Vihren Sandanski–Svoboda Peshtera 3–1.)	
16	Svoboda Peshtera (Note: Svoboda Peshtera was supposed to be relegated to A RFG Pazardzhik since two clubs from the Southwest region (Bansko and CSKA Sofia II) were relegated from 2016–17 Second League. However, CSKA Sofia II refused to participate in 2017–18 Third League, thus Svoboda Peshtera kept its place in the league.)	34	11	4	19	36	75	−39	37	
17	Velbazhd Kyustendil (R)	34	9	5	20	44	63	−19	32	Relegation to Regional Divisions
18	Chepinets Velingrad (R)	34	5	3	26	33	119	−86	18	Relegation to Regional Divisions

Source: bulgarian-football.com, Soccerway
Rules for classification: 1) Points; 2) Head-to-head points; 3) Head-to-head goal difference; 4) Head-to-head goals scored; 5) Head-to-head away goals scored (only if two teams); 6) Goal difference; 7) Goals scored; 8) Fairplay ranking; 9) Draw.
(C) Champions; (P) Promoted; (R) Relegated
