= 2020–21 Third Amateur Football League (Bulgaria) =

Third Amateur Football League
- Season: 2020–21
- Promoted: Spartak Varna; Levski Lom; Marek Dupnitsa; Maritsa Plovdiv

The 2020–21 Third Amateur Football League season was the 71st of the Bulgarian Third Amateur League. The group is equivalent to the third level of the Bulgarian football pyramid, comprising four divisions based on geographical areas. These divisions are the North-West, North-East, South-East, and South-West. The number of teams in each division varies, similarly to previous seasons. The season started on 8 August 2020, a delay of two weeks due to the COVID-19 situation in Bulgaria.

The first round match between Etar's second team and Levski 2007 (Levski), which was originally to be held on 9 August, was postponed after Hristo Markov from the Veliko Tarnovo team tested positive for the virus. Two more matches (from the second round) will also be held at a later date than the on which they were set to be played - between Etar II and OFK Tryavna (even though all the other Etar team members' test results were negative) as well as the Levski 2020 (Lom) versus Lokomotiv Mezdra encounter, the latter due to repair work pertaining to the building and the pitch of Lom's city stadium. On 29 September 2020, FC Kyustendil (Kyustendil) were deducted three points due to withdrawing their junior youth team from the group in which it was competing. On 10 October 2020, the match between Granit Vladaya and Velbazhd was abandoned during the second half with approximately 20 minutes remaining and the score tied at 0:0 after a verbal exchange between the Granit captain Georgi Gaydarov and a fan resulted in the former confronting the supporter, which led to a mass fight in the stands, with the match officials also being hurt in the melee. Granit eventually received a six-match ban on hosting games while Velbazhd were awarded a 3:0 win by default.

== Team changes ==
=== Promoted to Second League ===
- Dobrudzha Dobrich
- Sozopol
- Yantra Gabrovo
- Minyor Pernik
- Sportist Svoge
- Septemvri Simitli

=== Relegated to Regional Leagues (Disqualified) ===
- Kaliakra Kavarna
- Lokomotiv Ruse

=== Promoted from Regional Leagues ===
- Spartak Plovdiv
- Sportist General Toshevo
- Pirin Gotse Delchev
- Velbazhd Kyustendil
- Inter Dobrich

=== Relegated from Second League ===
- Spartak Varna
- Spartak Pleven
- Vereya
- Pomorie

=== Relegated from First League ===
- Dunav Ruse (Relegated directly to Third League for financial problems)

== North-East Group ==
=== Stadia and Locations ===
Locations of teams in the 2020-21 North-East Third League

North-East Third League
- Season: 2020–21

Team	City	Stadium	Capacity
Benkovski	Byala	Georgi Benkosvki	3,000
Botev	Novi Pazar	Gradski	8,000
Chernolomets Popovo	Popovo	Stamo Kostov Stadium	5,000
Dorostol Silistra	Silistra	Louis Eyer Stadium	12,000
Dunav Ruse	Rousse	Gradski Stadion	13,000
Hitrino	Hitrino	Hitrino	600
Inter Dobrich	Dobrich	Druzhba Stadium	12,500
Kubrat	Kubrat	Gradski	6,000
Ludogorets III	Razgrad	Eagles' Nest	2,000
Septemvri	Tervel	Septemvri	700
Shumen	Shumen	Panayot Volov Stadium	24,390
Spartak Varna	Varna	Spartak Stadium	6,000
Suvorovo	Suvorovo	Suvorovo	1,000
Svetkavitsa	Targovishte	Dimitar Burkov	5,000
Topoli	Topoli	Topoli Stadium	1,000
Ustrem	Donchevo	Donchevo Stadium	1,000

=== League table ===
Pos	Team	Pld	W	D	L	GF	GA	GD	Pts	Promotion or relegation
1	Spartak Varna (P)	28	22	5	1	81	11	+70	71	Promotion to Second League
2	Chernomorets Balchik	28	19	3	6	72	28	+44	60	
3	Septemvri Tervel	28	18	4	6	58	23	+35	58	
4	Svetkavitsa Targovishte	28	18	1	9	67	25	+42	55	
5	Dunav Ruse	28	16	5	7	60	33	+27	53	
6	Ludogorets III	28	15	6	7	75	29	+46	51	
7	Chernolomets Popovo	28	15	5	8	60	33	+27	50	
8	Shumen	28	16	2	10	67	36	+31	50	
9	Ustrem	28	14	2	12	62	48	+14	44	
10	Dorostol Silistra	28	12	2	14	33	50	−17	38	
11	Sportist GT	28	8	2	18	35	78	−43	26	
12	Botev Novi Pazar	28	6	3	19	24	66	−42	21	
13	Topoli	28	5	1	22	25	75	−50	16	
14	Inter Dobrich	28	2	1	25	22	126	−104	7	
15	Kubrat (Note: Kubrat declined further participation on 25 February 2021, and subsequently dropped down to the Ruse Regional group. The team's results until that point were kept, and all fixtures until the end of the season would result in a 3–0 awarded win for their opponents.) (R, D)	28	2	2	24	9	82	−73	8	Relegation to Regional Divisions
16	Benkovski Byala (Note: Benkovski Byala declined further participation on 13 August 2020, and subsequently dropped down to the Ruse Regional group. All fixtures involving Benkovski were cancelled.) (R, D)	0	0	0	0	0	0	0	0	Relegation to Regional Divisions

Source: bulgarian-football.com, Soccerway
Rules for classification: 1) Points; 2) Head-to-head points; 3) Head-to-head goal difference; 4) Head-to-head goals scored; 5) Head-to-head away goals scored (only if two teams); 6) Goal difference; 7) Goals scored; 8) Fairplay ranking; 9) Draw.
(D) Disqualified; (P) Promoted; (R) Relegated

== South-East Group ==
=== Stadia and Locations ===
Location of teams in 2020–21 South-East Third League

South-East Third League
- Season: 2020-21

Team	City	Stadium	Capacity
Atletik	Kuklen	Atletik	1,000
Borislav	Parvomay	Gradski	8,000
Chernomorets	Burgas	Chernomorets Stadium	22,000
Dimitrovgrad	Dimitrovgrad	Minyor	10,000
Gigant	Saedinenie	Saedinenie	5,000
Haskovo	Haskovo	Stadium Dimitar Kanev	20,000
Karnobat	Karnobat	Gradski	3,000
Levski	Karlovo	Vasil Levski	3,000
Maritsa Plovdiv	Plovdiv	Sporten Kompleks Botev 1912	4,000
Minyor	Radnevo	Minyor	2,000
Nesebar	Nesebar	Stadion Nesebar	6,800
Rodopa	Smolyan	Septemvri Stadium	6,100
Rozova Dolina	Kazanlak	Sevtopolis	15,000
Sokol	Markovo	Sokol	2,500
Spartak Plovdiv	Plovdiv	Todor Diev Stadium	3,000
Svilengrad	Svilengrad	Kolodruma	1,750
FC Yambol	Yambol	Tundzha	18,000
Zagorets	Nova Zagora	Zagorets	5,900

=== League table ===
Pos	Team	Pld	W	D	L	GF	GA	GD	Pts	Promotion or relegation
1	Maritsa Plovdiv (P)	34	26	5	3	79	26	+53	83	Promotion to Second League
2	Zagorets	34	26	5	3	87	22	+65	83	
3	Chernomorets Burgas	34	25	6	3	78	22	+56	81	
4	Rozova Dolina	34	18	8	8	66	47	+19	62	
5	Gigant Saedinenie	34	16	8	10	53	30	+23	56	
6	Atletik Kuklen	34	16	4	14	41	35	+6	52	
7	Dimitrovgrad	34	13	8	13	38	40	−2	47	
8	Levski Karlovo	34	14	5	15	47	55	−8	47	
9	Rodopa Smolyan	34	13	7	14	58	43	+15	46	
10	Izvor Gorski Izvor	34	11	12	11	43	35	+8	45	
11	Borislav Parvomay	34	12	7	15	50	45	+5	43	
12	Haskovo	34	11	7	16	31	41	−10	40	
13	Sokol Markovo	34	11	5	18	44	69	−25	38	
14	Karnobat	34	10	7	17	35	58	−23	37	
15	Yambol	34	8	9	17	29	52	−23	33	
16	Nesebar	34	8	9	17	41	68	−27	33	
17	Spartak Plovdiv (R)	34	8	6	20	35	58	−23	30	Relegation to Regional Divisions
18	Vereya (R)	34	1	0	33	22	131	−109	3	Relegation to Regional Divisions

Source: bulgarian-football.com, Soccerway
Rules for classification: 1) Points; 2) Head-to-head points; 3) Head-to-head goal difference; 4) Head-to-head goals scored; 5) Head-to-head away goals scored (only if two teams); 6) Goal difference; 7) Goals scored; 8) Fairplay ranking; 9) Draw.
(P) Promoted; (R) Relegated

== North-West Group ==
North-West Third League
- Season: 2020-21

=== Stadia and locations ===
Location of teams in 2020–21 North-West Third League

=== League table ===
Pos	Team	Pld	W	D	L	GF	GA	GD	Pts	Promotion or relegation
1	Levski Lom (P)	34	28	6	0	86	11	+75	90	Promotion to Second League
2	Vihar Slavyanovo	34	22	6	6	67	29	+38	72	
3	Yantra Polski Trambesh	34	20	6	8	67	38	+29	66	
4	Sevlievo	34	18	7	9	55	30	+25	61	
5	Spartak Pleven	34	19	3	12	76	34	+42	60	
6	Botev Vratsa II	34	18	6	10	67	44	+23	60	
7	Partizan Cherven Bryag	34	15	8	11	47	42	+5	53	
8	Pavlikeni	34	14	8	12	41	35	+6	50	
9	Lokomotiv Dryanovo	34	15	4	15	59	58	+1	49	
10	Drenovets	34	13	10	11	55	55	0	49	
11	Lokomotiv Mezdra	34	14	4	16	46	48	−2	46	
12	Akademik Svishtov	34	10	5	19	41	60	−19	35	
13	Levski 2007	34	8	10	16	36	45	−9	34	
14	Parva Atomna	34	9	6	19	38	63	−25	33	
15	Bdin Vidin	34	8	9	17	35	84	−49	33	
16	Etar II	34	9	5	20	45	62	−17	32	
17	Peshtera Galata	34	9	5	20	48	82	−34	32	
18	Tryavna (R)	34	2	2	30	21	110	−89	8	Relegation to Regional Divisions

Source: bulgarian-football.com, Soccerway
Rules for classification: 1) Points; 2) Head-to-head points; 3) Head-to-head goal difference; 4) Head-to-head goals scored; 5) Head-to-head away goals scored (only if two teams); 6) Goal difference; 7) Goals scored; 8) Fairplay ranking; 9) Draw.
(P) Promoted; (R) Relegated

== South-West Group ==
South-West Third League
- Season: 2020-21

Location of teams in 2020–21 South-West Third League

=== League table ===
Pos	Team	Pld	W	D	L	GF	GA	GD	Pts	Promotion or relegation
1	Marek Dupnitsa (P)	34	25	7	2	84	24	+60	82	Promotion to Second League
2	Kyustendil (Note: Kyustendil had a three points deduction because of a penalty imposed on its youth team.)	34	26	4	4	63	14	+49	79	
3	Belasitsa Petrich	34	23	9	2	68	27	+41	78	
4	Vihren Sandanski	34	23	6	5	63	25	+38	75	
5	Oborishte	34	18	6	10	55	41	+14	60	
6	Balkan Botevgrad	34	16	10	8	62	34	+28	58	
7	Chavdar Etropole	33	15	6	12	61	43	+18	51	
8	Botev Ihtiman	34	13	7	14	53	41	+12	46	
9	Pirin Gotse Delchev	34	13	6	15	37	32	+5	45	
10	Pirin Razlog	34	11	8	15	40	59	−19	41	
11	Nadezhda Dobroslavtsi	34	10	6	18	40	56	−16	36	
12	Slivnishki Geroy	34	9	9	16	38	44	−6	36	
13	Rilski Sportist	34	9	7	18	30	45	−15	34	
14	Bansko	34	10	4	20	28	47	−19	34	
15	Levski Chepintsi	34	10	4	20	34	72	−38	34	
16	Granit Vladaya	34	9	5	20	34	65	−31	32	
17	Perun Kresna (R)	34	6	4	24	25	77	−52	22	Relegation to Regional Divisions
18	Velbazhd Kyustendil (R)	34	4	4	26	16	83	−67	16	Relegation to Regional Divisions

Source: bulgarian-football.com, Soccerway
Rules for classification: 1) Points; 2) Head-to-head points; 3) Head-to-head goal difference; 4) Head-to-head goals scored; 5) Head-to-head away goals scored (only if two teams); 6) Goal difference; 7) Goals scored; 8) Fairplay ranking; 9) Draw.
(P) Promoted; (R) Relegated
