= 2015–16 V AFG =

Bulgarian V Football Group
- Season: 2015–16

The 2015–16 V Football Group season was the 66th season of the Bulgarian V Group. The group comprised the third level of the Bulgarian football pyramid and was divided into four geographic regions: North-West, North-East, South-East, and South-West. The 2015–16 season was notable for the participation of CSKA Sofia and Lokomotiv Sofia in the South-Western region, as the two teams were unable to obtain a license for the A PFG due to unpaid debts, which led to their administrative relegation.

== Changes from the 2014–15 season ==
=== Club Movements Between V Group and B Group ===
The champions of the four 2014–15 V AFG divisions were promoted to the 2015–16 B Group: Dunav Ruse from V AFG North-East and Pomorie from V AFG South-East, Spartak Pleven from V AFG North-West and Oborishte Panagyurishte from V AFG South-West.

In return, four teams were relegated to the V AFG: Botev Vratsa, Chernomorets Burgas, Rakovski and Spartak Varna.

=== Club Movements Between V Group and the Regional Groups ===
- North-East: Provadia and Dorostol 2003 relegated last season to regional divisions. Spartak Varna, which relegated to the amateur divisions on financial and organizational reasons, declared on 11 August 2015 its inability to participate shortly before the start of the season. The new teams, coming from the regional divisions, are Inter Plachidol, Marisan Ruse and Himik Devnya.
- North-West: Vidima-Rakovski Sevlievo and Sitomir Nikopol relegated from last season to regional divisions. The new teams, coming from the regional divisions, are Era Sevlievo, Gigant Belene, Vihar Slavnyanovo and Tryavna. The team of Era Sevlievo renamed itself into FC Sevlievo.
- South-East: FC Stara Zagora relegated from last season to regional divisions, while Elhovo and Rodopa Smolyan resigned shortly before the start of the season. Furthermore, Tundzha Yambol declared on 31 July 2015 their inability to participate this season due to financial and organizational reasons. Its place was taken by FC Karnobat, which won 3-0 a play-off game against Vereya Stara Zagora II in Elhovo. The new teams, coming from the regional divisions, are Uragan Boyadzhik and Borislav Parvomay.
- South-West: FC Sportist Svoge and Mesta Hadzhidimovo relegated from last season to regional divisions. The new teams, coming from the regional divisions, are Chiko Byaga, Botev Ihtiman and Sofia 2010. New teams, coming from A PFG, are CSKA Sofia and Lokomotiv Sofia as they had not received professional license. Two days before the start of the season, the game between CSKA and Slivnishki Geroy was postponed due to problems with the CSKA players' files, which is currently resolved. After playing its first game, the other Sofia powerhouse Lokomotiv declared its inability to maintain its participation due to financial and organizational reasons. The decision was confirmed by the Zonal Council of BFU on 24 August 2015, which led to the expulsion of Lokomotiv and the annulment of its current results. Conegliano German, which finished 10th last season, was acquired by DIT Group and later merged into PFC Septemvri Sofia.

=== Broadcasting ===
Kanal 3 is the TV partner of the V group.

== North-East V AFG ==
Pos	Team	Pld	W	D	L	GF	GA	GD	Pts	Qualification or relegation
1	Chernomorets Balchik (P)	26	24	1	1	79	14	+65	73	Promotion to Second League
2	Kaliakra Kavarna	26	18	4	4	66	24	+42	58	
3	Suvorovo	26	14	6	6	46	32	+14	48	
4	Svetkavitsa Targovishte	26	13	3	10	41	32	+9	42	
5	Botev Novi Pazar	26	11	5	10	43	27	+16	38	
6	Inter Plachidol	26	11	5	10	34	33	+1	38	
7	Marisan Ruse	26	12	2	12	42	47	−5	38	
8	Benkovski Byala	26	10	2	14	30	56	−26	32	
9	Himik Devnya	26	10	2	14	36	64	−28	32	
10	Septemvri Tervel	26	9	4	13	42	39	+3	31	
11	Shumen 1929	26	8	6	12	40	39	+1	30	
12	Kubrat	26	8	5	13	26	37	−11	29	
13	Ticha Dolni Chiflik (Note: During the winter break Ticha Dolni Chiflik decided to cancel their participation in the championship due to financial difficulties. All remaining fixtures are awarded 0−3 against them.) (R)	25	5	3	17	21	56	−35	18	Relegation to Regional Divisions
14	Dve Mogili (Note: During the winter break Dve Mogili decided to cancel their participation in the championship due to financial difficulties. All remaining fixtures are awarded 0−3 against them.) (R)	25	3	2	20	18	64	−46	11	Relegation to Regional Divisions

Source: bulgarian-football.com, Soccerway
Rules for classification: 1) Points; 2) Head-to-head points; 3) Head-to-head goal difference; 4) Head-to-head goals scored; 5) Head-to-head away goals scored (only if two teams); 6) Goal difference; 7) Goals scored; 8) Fairplay ranking; 9) Draw.
(P) Promoted; (R) Relegated

== South-East V AFG ==
Pos	Team	Pld	W	D	L	GF	GA	GD	Pts	Qualification or relegation
1	Nesebar (P)	34	29	3	2	88	20	+68	90	Promotion to Second League
2	Rozova Dolina	34	24	4	6	81	30	+51	76	
3	Zagorets Nova Zagora (Note: The game from Round 1 between Zagorets and Svilengrad was annulled by the Zonal Council of the BFU as it was established that both club used illegible players (Vladislav Yamukov and Stoyan Kostadinov), which had remaining suspensions from the past season.)	33	22	6	5	64	20	+44	72	
4	Uragan Boyadzhik	34	20	4	10	93	45	+48	64	
5	Dimitrovgrad	34	18	8	8	61	38	+23	62	
6	Gigant Saedinenie	34	18	4	12	67	58	+9	58	
7	Svilengrad	33	17	5	11	72	53	+19	56	
8	Asenovets	34	15	8	11	57	46	+11	53	
9	Maritsa Plovdiv	34	14	9	11	45	29	+16	51	
10	Eurocollege Plovdiv	34	14	4	16	69	74	−5	46	
11	Karnobat (Note: Karnobat took the place of Tundzha Yambol after the Yambol club declared its resignation on 31 July 2015 due to financial and organizational reasons.)	34	13	4	17	56	56	0	43	
12	Spartak Plovdiv	34	12	6	16	36	38	−2	42	
13	Levski Karlovo	34	11	2	21	43	75	−32	35	
14	Rakovski	34	10	4	20	45	68	−23	34	
15	Borislav Parvomay	34	6	11	17	34	59	−25	29	
16	Minyor Radnevo	34	8	3	23	32	84	−52	27	
17	Chernomorets Burgas (Note: On 9 February 2016 Chernomorets received a three point deduction due to unpaid obligations to their former player Pedrinha.) (R)	34	6	4	24	42	100	−58	19	Relegation to Regional Divisions
18	Sliven 2000 (R)	34	3	1	30	20	112	−92	10	Relegation to Regional Divisions

Source: bulgarian-football.com, Soccerway
Rules for classification: 1) Points; 2) Head-to-head points; 3) Head-to-head goal difference; 4) Head-to-head goals scored; 5) Head-to-head away goals scored (only if two teams); 6) Goal difference; 7) Goals scored; 8) Fairplay ranking; 9) Draw.
(P) Promoted; (R) Relegated

== North-West V AFG ==
Pos	Team	Pld	W	D	L	GF	GA	GD	Pts	Qualification or relegation
1	Etar Veliko Tarnovo (P)	30	27	1	2	100	16	+84	82	Promotion to Second League
2	Botev Vratsa	30	27	0	3	101	17	+84	81	
3	Akademik Svishtov	30	19	2	9	58	34	+24	59	
4	Levski 2007	30	14	6	10	48	33	+15	48	
5	Kariana Erden	30	14	5	11	49	44	+5	47	
6	Pavlikeni	30	15	1	14	39	52	−13	46	
7	Vihar Slavyanovo	30	13	7	10	44	38	+6	46	
8	Partizan Cherven Bryag	30	13	5	12	47	40	+7	44	
9	Sevlievo	30	13	3	14	49	56	−7	42	
10	Botev Lukovit	30	13	2	15	47	56	−9	41	
11	Tryavna	30	9	9	12	36	42	−6	36	
12	Bdin Vidin	30	11	1	18	48	74	−26	34	
13	Juventus Malchika	30	9	4	17	32	62	−30	31	
14	Yantra Gabrovo (R)	30	8	5	17	29	50	−21	29	Relegation to Regional Divisions
15	Botev Kozloduy (R)	30	4	3	23	23	65	−42	15	Relegation to Regional Divisions
16	Gigant Belene (R)	30	3	2	25	21	92	−71	11	Relegation to Regional Divisions

Source: bulgarian-football.com, Soccerway
Rules for classification: 1) Points; 2) Head-to-head points; 3) Head-to-head goal difference; 4) Head-to-head goals scored; 5) Head-to-head away goals scored (only if two teams); 6) Goal difference; 7) Goals scored; 8) Fairplay ranking; 9) Draw.
(P) Promoted; (R) Relegated

== South-West V AFG ==
Pos	Team	Pld	W	D	L	GF	GA	GD	Pts	Qualification or relegation
1	CSKA Sofia (P)	32	31	1	0	146	10	+136	94	Promoted to Second League
2	Vitosha Bistritsa	32	23	5	4	72	16	+56	74	
3	Slivnishki Geroy	32	21	6	5	80	35	+45	69	
4	Strumska Slava	32	18	6	8	58	36	+22	60	
5	Minyor Pernik	32	17	8	7	55	35	+20	59	
6	Vihren Sandanski	32	17	4	11	48	36	+12	55	
7	Chiko Byaga	32	12	7	13	57	67	−10	43	
8	Septemvri Sofia	32	13	3	16	67	62	+5	42	
9	Belasitsa Petrich	32	11	6	15	41	52	−11	39	
10	Botev Ihtiman	32	10	7	15	52	66	−14	37	
11	Rilski Sportist Samokov	32	10	5	17	41	43	−2	35	
12	Sofia 2010	32	11	1	20	51	72	−21	34	
13	Velbazhd Kyustendil	32	9	7	16	42	56	−14	34	
14	Chepinets Velingrad	32	7	11	14	35	72	−37	32	
15	Pirin Gotse Delchev	32	8	4	20	33	63	−30	28	
16	Germanea	32	5	4	23	20	122	−102	19	
17	Balkan Varvara (R)	32	4	5	23	25	80	−55	17	Relegated to Regional Divisions
18	Lokomotiv Sofia (Note: Lokomotiv Sofia was excluded from the group on 24 August 2015 for a second no-show without an excusable reason. The team's results up to this point were cancelled and its opponents until the end of the season received byes. The team was relegated to the Sofia City Regional Division, which it joined straightaway.) (R)	0	0	0	0	0	0	0	0	Relegated to Regional Divisions

Source: bulgarian-football.com, Soccerway
Rules for classification: 1) Points; 2) Head-to-head points; 3) Head-to-head goal difference; 4) Head-to-head goals scored; 5) Head-to-head away goals scored (only if two teams); 6) Goal difference; 7) Goals scored; 8) Fairplay ranking; 9) Draw.
(P) Promoted; (R) Relegated
