= Eduard Metchikyan =

Bulgarian-Armenian footballer

Personal information
- Date of birth: 28 February 1996 (age 30)
- Place of birth: Sofia, Bulgaria
- Height: 1.90 m (6 ft 3 in)
- Position: Goalkeeper

Youth career
- Lokomotiv Sofia
- Slavia Sofia
- Ludogorets Razgrad

Senior career*
Years	Team	Apps	(Gls)
2014	Sozopol	0	(0)
2015	Haskovo	1	(0)
2015	Bdin Vidin	13	(0)
2016	Líšeň	7	(0)
2016	Balkan Botevgrad	15	(0)
2017	Kom Berkovitsa	14	(0)
2017–2018	Lokomotiv BDZh	22	(0)

International career
2013	Armenia U19	1	(0)
Refereeing career
Domestic
Years	League	Role
2020–	Third League	Referee
2021–	Second League	Referee
- * Club domestic league appearances and goals

Eduard Metchikyan (Bulgarian: Едуард Мечикян, Armenian: Էդուարդ Մեչիկան; born 28 February 1996) is a Bulgarian-Armenian retired footballer who played as a goalkeeper and now referee.

== Career ==
=== Early career ===
Metchikyan bеgan his career in Lokomotiv Sofia. In 2014, he moved to FC Sozopol and in 2015 he joined A Group sided PFC Haskovo. On 25 May 2015 he made his official debut in A Group for the team, replacing the injured Nikolay Bankov in the 13th minute.

=== Czech Republic ===
In January 2016 Eduard signed with the Czech third-level team Líšeň until end of the season with the option to move to Czech First League team Zbrojovka Brno after his contract expires. Metchikiyan also would train with Zbrojovka while he plays for Líšeň.

== Career statistics ==
=== Club ===
As of 16 July 2018

Club performance			League		Cup		Continental		Other		Total	
Club	League	Season	Apps	Goals	Apps	Goals	Apps	Goals	Apps	Goals	Apps	Goals
Haskovo	A Group	2014–15	1	0	0	0	–		–		1	0
Haskovo	Total		1	0	0	0	0	0	0	0	1	0
Bdin Vidin	V Group	2015–16	13	0	2	0	–		–		15	0
Bdin Vidin	Total		13	0	2	0	0	0	0	0	15	0
SK Líšeň	MSFL	2015–16	7	0	0	0	–		–		7	0
SK Líšeň	Total		7	0	0	0	0	0	0	0	7	0
Balkan Botevgrad	Third League	2016–17	15	0	2	0	–		–		17	0
Balkan Botevgrad	Total		15	0	2	0	0	0	0	0	17	0
Kom Berkovitsa	Third League	2016–17	14	0	0	0	–		–		14	0
Kom Berkovitsa	Total		14	0	0	0	0	0	0	0	14	0
Lokomotiv BDZh	OFG Sofia (stolitsa) - sever	2017–18	22	0	4	0	–		–		26	0
Lokomotiv BDZh	Total		22	0	4	0	0	0	0	0	26	0
Career statistics			72	0	8	0	0	0	0	0	80	0
