= Yavor Vandev =

Bulgarian footballer

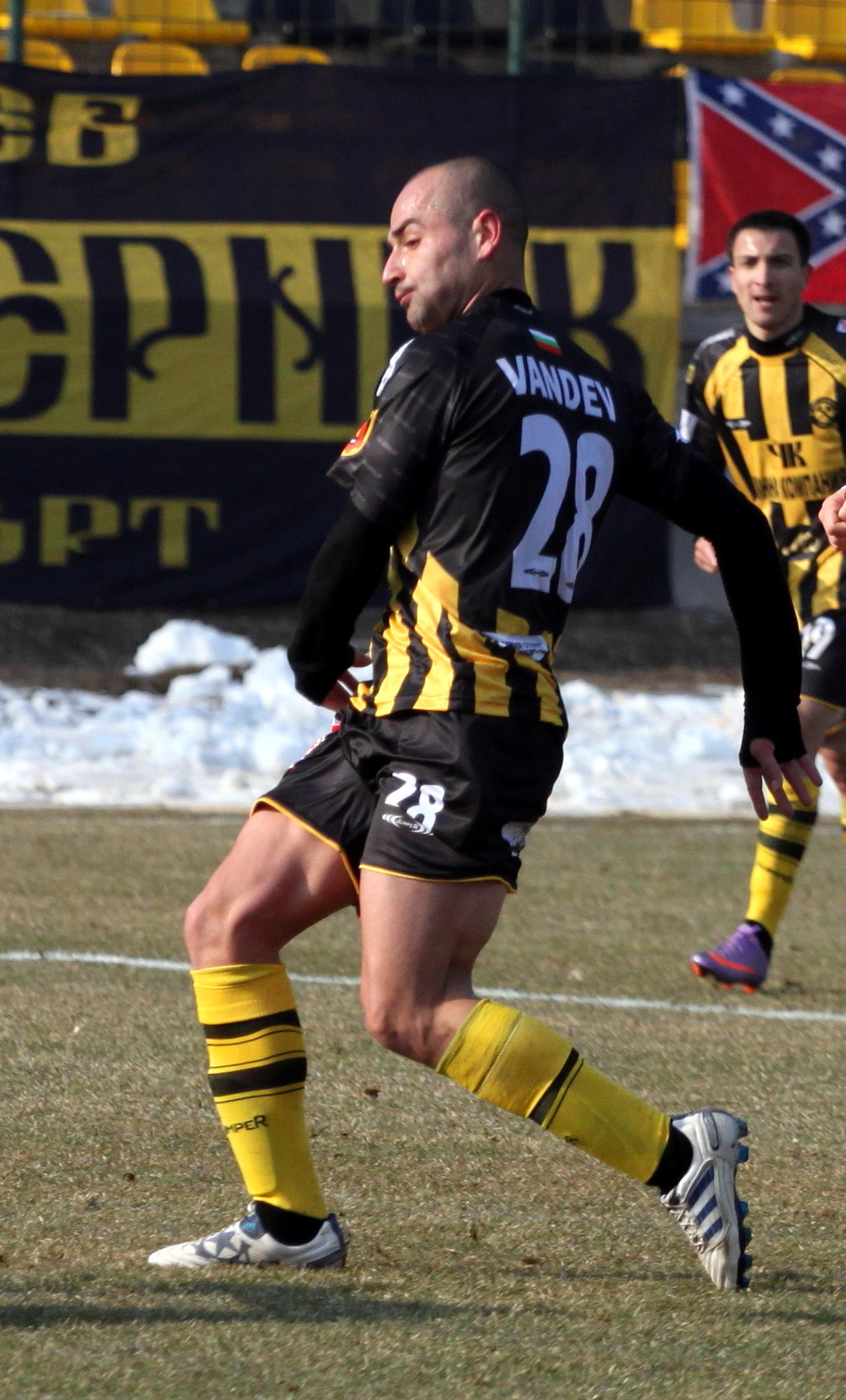

Personal information
- Full name: Yavor Borisov Vandev
- Date of birth: 29 May 1983 (age 43)
- Place of birth: Sliven, Bulgaria
- Height: 1.76 m (5 ft 9 in)
- Position: Forward

Team information
- Current team: Svoboda Peshtera
- Number: 21

Youth career
- Sliven

Senior career*
| Years | Team | Apps | (Gls) |
| 2001–2003 | Sliven 2000 | 33 | (11) |
| 2003–2008 | Lokomotiv Plovdiv | 83 | (26) |
| 2008–2010 | Sliven 2000 | 33 | (5) |
| 2010 | Brestnik 1948 | 8 | (2) |
| 2011 | Minyor Pernik | 27 | (3) |
| 2012 | Bdin Vidin | 7 | (1) |
| 2012 | Haskovo | 11 | (5) |
| 2013 | Club Valencia | ? | (?) |
| 2014 | Haskovo | 7 | (0) |
| 2014 | Kaliakra Kavarna | 1 | (1) |
| 2014–2015 | Lapta Türk Birliği | 16 | (4) |
| 2015 | Kaliakra Kavarna | 11 | (9) |
| 2016 | SV Neubäu | 25 | (13) |
| 2017– | Svoboda Peshtera | 0 | (0) |
- * Club domestic league appearances and goals as of 1 March 2015

Yavor Borisov Vandev (Bulgarian: Явор Въндев; born 29 May 1983) is a Bulgarian footballer who plays as a forward for Svoboda Peshtera.

== Career ==
Born in Sliven, Vandev started to play football at local club Sliven 2000. He made his debut for the first team in 2001, in the Bulgarian amateur division. After a series of good displays, Vandev caught the eye of Lokomotiv Plovdiv scouts and he signed for "Loko" in the early 2003. The forward made his official debut in the Bulgarian first division on 13 March 2004 in a match against Chernomorets Burgas as a 62nd-minute substitute. In the same year Vandev won the Bulgarian Championship title with Lokomotiv. He played for the team from Plovdiv for five seasons.

In August 2008 Yavor returned to his home team of Sliven 2000 for a fee of €100,000. He began his second period in Sliven very well and scored 5 goals in 4 matches. After periods with Brestnik, Minyor Pernik, Bdin and Haskovo, Vandev moved away from Bulgaria to play for Club Valencia, a team competing in the Maldivian Dhiraagu Dhivehi League.

== Honours ==
Lokomotiv Plovdiv

- Champion of Bulgaria 2004
- Bulgarian Supercup 2004
