= Biser Ivanov =

Bulgarian footballer and coach

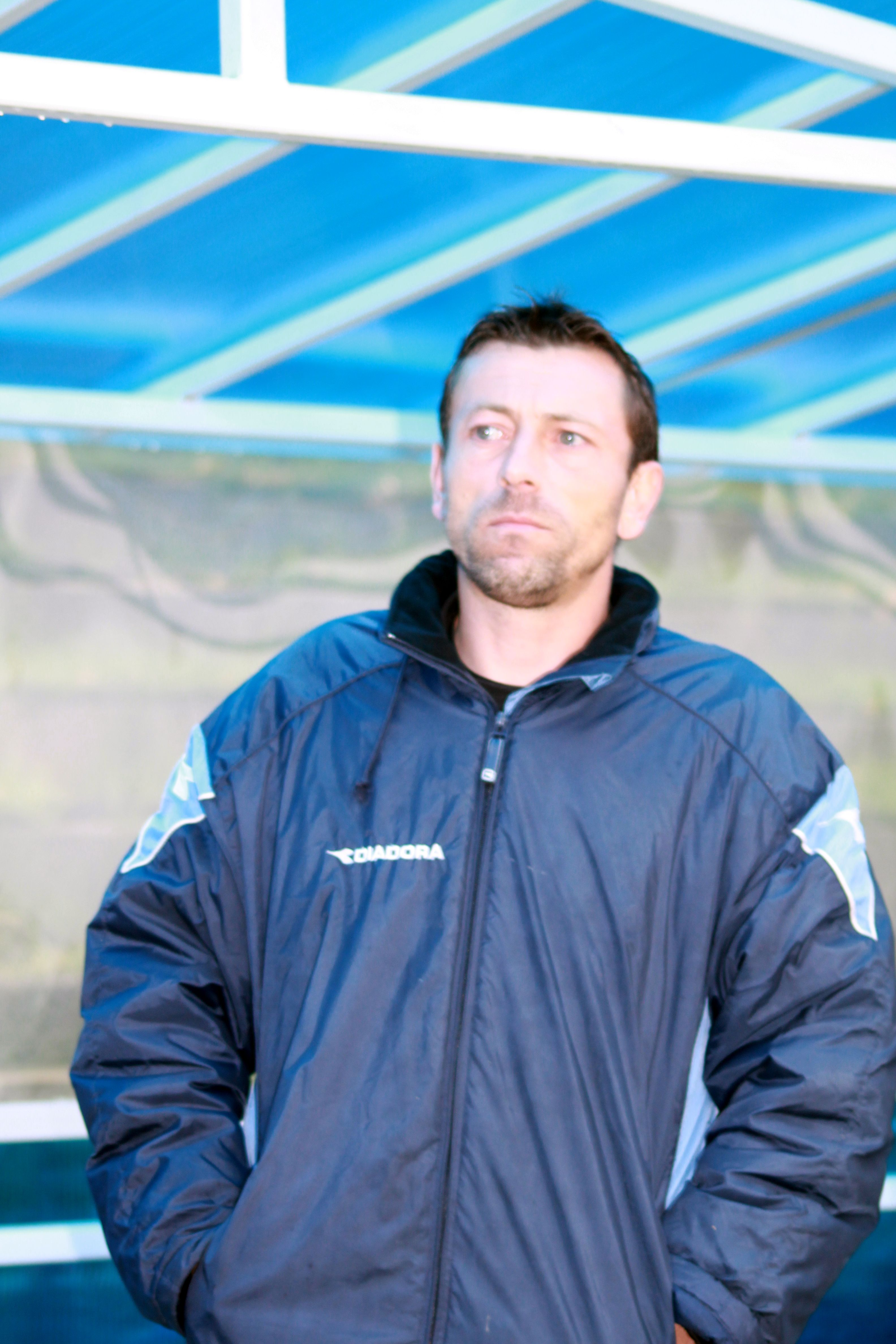
- Бисер Иванов

Personal information
- Full name: Biser Dyatlovich Ivanov (Bulgarian: Бисер Дятлович Иванов)
- Date of birth: 24 June 1973 (age 53)
- Place of birth: Sofia, Bulgaria
- Position: Defensive midfielder

Senior career*
Years	Team	Apps	(Gls)
1994–1995	Levski Elin Pelin		
1995–1996	Velbazhd Kyustendil		
1996–1997	Chirpan		
1997–1999	Spartak Plovdiv		
1999–2004	Levski Sofia	106	(5)
2004	Anorthosis		
2005	Marek Dupnitsa	18	(0)
2006–2008	Levski Elin Pelin		

International career
1999–2002	Bulgaria	18	(0)

Managerial career
- 2008–: Levski Elin Pelin
- * Club domestic league appearances and goals

Biser Ivanov (Bulgarian: Бисер Иванов) (born 24 June 1973 in Sofia) is a retired Bulgarian footballer and coach, who played as a midfielder. Ivanov was nicknamed "The Legend" (Bulgarian: Легендата).

His career began and ended at Levski Elin Pelin. In between, Ivanov also played for Velbazhd Kyustendil, Chirpan, Spartak Plovdiv, Levski Sofia and Marek Dupnitsa in Bulgaria, Anorthosis in Cyprus, and for the Bulgaria national team.
