= Druzhba Stadium =

Druzhba Stadium is a name of several stadiums.

- Druzhba Stadium (Dobrich), a stadium in Dobrich, Bulgaria
- Druzhba Stadium, a stadium in Berehove, Ukraine
- Druzhba Stadium, former name of Ukraina Stadium in Lviv, Ukraine
