= Georgi Kaloyanov =

Bulgarian footballer

Personal information
- Full name: Georgi Georgiev Kaloyanov
- Date of birth: 7 April 1984 (age 42)
- Place of birth: Burgas, Bulgaria
- Height: 1.83 m (6 ft 0 in)
- Position: Midfielder

Team information
- Current team: Karnobat

Youth career
- Chernomorets Burgas

Senior career*
Years	Team	Apps	(Gls)
2002–2004	Chernomorets Burgas	36	(3)
2004–2008	Nesebar	41	(1)
2008–2010	Chernomorets Pomorie	18	(1)
2010	Ravda	5	(0)
2011	Nesebar	3	(0)
2011–2012	Neftochimic Burgas	17	(0)
2013–2014	Master Burgas	?	(?)
2014–	Karnobat	0	(0)
- * Club domestic league appearances and goals as of 23 June 2014

Georgi Kaloyanov (Bulgarian: Георги Калоянов; born 7 April 1984) is a Bulgarian footballer who currently plays as a midfielder for FC Karnobat.

== Career ==
Kaloyanov previously played for Chernomorets Burgas in the A PFG.
