= Georgi Mechedzhiev =

Bulgarian footballer and coach

Personal information
- Full name: Georgi Stoyanov Mechedzhiev
- Date of birth: 27 April 1978 (age 48)
- Place of birth: Yambol, Bulgaria
- Height: 1.70 m (5 ft 7 in)
- Position: Right back

Team information
- Current team: Svoboda Peshtera (manager)

Senior career*
Years	Team	Apps	(Gls)
1997–1998	Tundzha Yambol	14	(1)
1998–1999	Rozova Dolina	17	(2)
1999–2000	Beroe	20	(3)
2000–2002	Neftochimic Burgas	33	(3)
2002–2003	Spartak Varna	30	(3)
2003–2007	Slavia Sofia	96	(0)
2008–2010	Lokomotiv Plovdiv	70	(0)
2010–2012	Montana	62	(0)
2013	Lokomotiv Plovdiv	1	(0)
2013–2014	Montana	12	(0)
2015	Botev Vratsa	2	(0)
2015–2017	SV Neubäu	55	(5)

Managerial career
- 2017–: Svoboda Peshtera
- * Club domestic league appearances and goals

Georgi Mechedzhiev (Bulgarian: Георги Мечеджиев; born 27 April 1978 in Yambol) is a Bulgarian football coach and former player who is the current head coach of Svoboda Peshtera.

As a player, Mechedzhiev mainly played as a right-back. He played more than 250 games in the Bulgarian League, appearing in the competition for Beroe Stara Zagora, Neftochimic Burgas, Spartak Varna, Slavia Sofia, Lokomotiv Plovdiv and Montana.

== Managerial career ==
On 28 June 2017, Mechedzhiev was appointed as head coach of Third League club Svoboda Peshtera.
