= FC Sofia 2010 =

Bulgarian football club

FC Sofia
- Full name: Football Club Sofia 2010
- Nickname(s): The Citizens
- Founded: 2010; 15 years ago
- Dissolved: 2016; 9 years ago merge with Tsarsko Selo
- Ground: Tsarsko Selo Stadium, Sofia
- Capacity: 300
- 2015–16: V Group, 12th
Home colours	Away colours

FC Sofia 2010 (Bulgarian: ФК София 2010) was a Bulgarian football club, which lastly competed in Bulgaria's 3rd division, the V AFG. Home matches were played at the new Tsarsko Selo Sports Complex in Sofia.

== History ==
=== Foundation and first seasons ===
In March 2007, under the initiative of his father Vladimir, NSA student Vasil Petrov established a football academy in Sofia. In 2010, after three consecutive years of growth, the academy formed a men's team and registered it with the Bulgarian Football Union. Officially named FC Sofia 2010, "the citizens", as they are known, played in the regional divisions until 2015, when the club attained first place in their group and gained promotion to the V AFG after defeating Sokol (Benkovski) in the play-off. At the half season team was on the last place of V Group with only 6 points.

=== 2015–2016: Manolov takeover and merge ===
In December 2015, the club was taken over by former CSKA Sofia administrator and Tsarsko Selo founder Stoyne Manolov, who appointed former Bulgarian international Todor Yanchev as manager and announced an ambitious goal of reaching second division in the coming years. The team finished the season using the kits and crest of Tsarsko Selo.

On 28 July 2016 the team was officially merged with Tsarsko Selo and the new team joined the Bulgarian Second Professional League.

== Honours ==
- A Regional Group:
  - Winners (1): 2014–15

== Shirt and sponsor ==
The original club colors were red and yellow. In 2013, they were changed to mirror the ones of the Brazil national team. From 2016 club changed their colors to Red and signed with the Spanish kit manufacturer Joma, who were also manufacturer of FC Tsarsko Selo.

Period	Kit manufacturer	Shirt partner
2013–2015	(United States) Nike	None
2016	(Spain) Joma	None

== Managers ==
Dates	Name	Honours
2012–2015	(Bulgaria) Bisser Hazday	1 A RFG title
2016	(Bulgaria) Todor Yanchev	

== Past seasons ==
Season	League	Place	W	D	L	GF	GA	Pts	Bulgarian Cup
2014–15	A RFG (IV)	1	15	3	2	76	16	48	not qualified
2015–16	V AFG (III)	12	11	1	20	51	72	34	not qualified
Green marks a season followed by promotion, red a season followed by relegation.
