= FC Svoboda Peshtera =

Bulgarian football club

Svoboda Peshtera
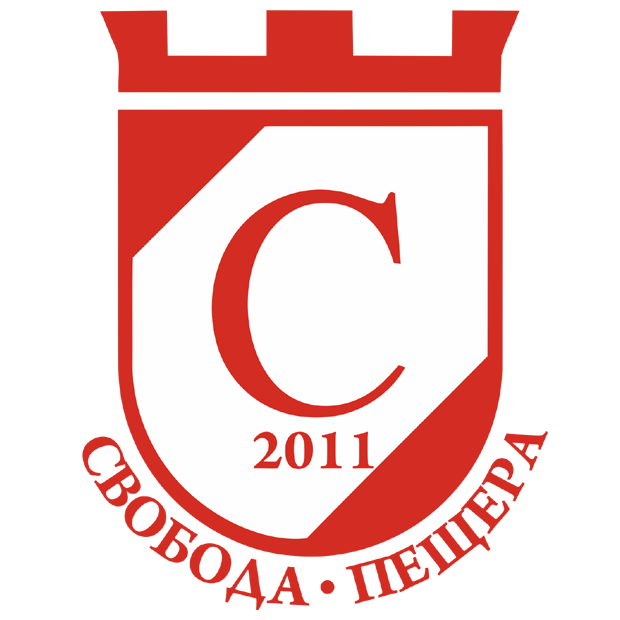
- Full name: Football Club Svoboda Peshtera
- Founded: 1946; 80 years ago
- Ground: Gradski Stadium
- Capacity: 3,500
- Manager: Georgi Mechedzhiev
- League: South-West Third League
- 2016–17: South-West Third League, 16th
Home colours	Away colours

Football Club Svoboda (Bulgarian: Футболен клуб Свобода) is a Bulgarian football club, based in Peshtera. The club currently plays in the South-West Third League.

== Current squad ==
As of 6 July 2017 Note: Flags indicate national team as defined under FIFA eligibility rules; some limited exceptions apply. Players may hold more than one non-FIFA nationality.

No.	Pos.	Nation	Player
—	GK	BUL	Stanislav Tomov
—	GK	BUL	Stefan Koshlukov
—	DF	BUL	Angel Parpulov
—	DF	BUL	Dimitar Zaykov
—	DF	BUL	Yordan Cholov
—	DF	BUL	Ventsislav Dimitrov
—	DF	BUL	Ivan Kamov
—	DF	BUL	Petar Mihov

No.	Pos.	Nation	Player
—	DF	BUL	Kristiyan Dzhamov
—	MF	BUL	Veselin Otman
—	MF	BUL	Todor Dinchev
—	MF	BUL	Dimitar Dechev
—	MF	BUL	Ivan Ralenekov
—	FW	BUL	Yavor Vandev
—	FW	BUL	Ivan Lazarov
—	FW	BUL	Temelko Zaykov
