= FC Shumen 1929 =

Shumen 1929
- Full name: Football Club Shumen 1929
- Nickname(s): Пивоварите (The Brewers)
- Founded: 10 June 2013; 12 years ago
- Dissolved: August 2016; 8 years ago
- Ground: Panayot Volov Stadium, Shumen
- Capacity: 24,390 (Original); 3,500 (V AFG License)
- 2015–16: North-Eastern V Group, 11th
Home colours	Away colours

FC Shumen 1929 (Bulgarian: ФК Шумен 1929) was a Bulgarian football club from the city of Shumen, which last competed in the North-Eastern section of Bulgaria's 3rd football league. Shumen 1929 played its home matches at the local Panayot Volov Stadium. The main kit colours of the team were yellow and blue.

Because of the city's famous brand of Shumensko beer, they were often affectionately called Пивоварите, or The Brewers.

== History ==
The team was founded in the summer of 2013 as an alternative to the other local club PFC Shumen 2010, which had been struggling financially for a number of years.

The newly founded FC Shumen 1929 shared a stadium with the old club during the 2013–14 V AFG season, resulting in the most recent 'Shumen derby' taking place in one of the top three levels of Bulgarian football. FC Shumen 1929 won the first game 3:1 on September 22, 2013, and followed that up with another win on April 5, 2014, this time with a scoreline of 2:1. At the end of the 2013/14 season, PFC Shumen 2010 was relegated from the North-Eastern V Group, and soon after disbanded altogether.

This temporarily left FC Shumen 1929 as the highest-ranked team from the city within the Bulgarian football pyramid, but the club soon began experiencing financial difficulties. They ultimately stopped fielding a senior side after the 2015–16 season, leaving Shumen without an official representative in the Bulgarian football system until the original club was refounded in 2018.

== Managers ==
Dates	Name	Honours
2013–2015	(Bulgaria) Valeri Venkov	
2015	(Bulgaria) (Ukraine) Petko Medvedsky	
2016	(Bulgaria) Valeri Venkov	

== Results ==
Season	League	Place	G	W	D	L	GF	GA	Pts	Bulgarian Cup	AFL Cup
2013–14	V AFG (III)	12 / 16	30	9	3	18	33	66	30	not qualified	did not enter
2014–15	V AFG	12 / 16	30	9	5	16	41	52	32	not qualified	Round 2
2015–16	V AFG	11 / 14	26	8	6	12	40	39	30	not qualified	Round 2
Green marks a season followed by promotion, red a season followed by relegation.

=== Records ===
- Biggest win: Preslav 0-7 FC Shumen 1929 (1 September 2013)
- Biggest loss: Ticha Dolni Chiflik 11-0 FC Shumen 1929 (17 November 2013)
