= FC Parva Atomna Kozloduy =

Bulgarian football club

Parva Atomna
- Full name: FC Parva Atomna Kozloduy
- Nickname: The Botev's warriors
- Founded: 1974; 51 years ago as FC Parva Atomna; 2000; 25 years ago as FC Botev Kozloduy; 2016; 9 years ago as FC Parva Atomna Kozloduy
- Ground: Hristo Botev, Kozloduy
- Capacity: 3,000
- Owner: Kozloduy Municipality
- Manager: Nikolay Ninov
- League: B RFG Vratsa
- 2022–23: 11th
| Home colours | Away colours |

FC Parva Atomna Kozloduy (Bulgarian: ФК Първа Атомна Козлодуй) is a Bulgarian football club from the town of Kozloduy. The club currently competes in the B RFG Vratsa.

== History ==
The first football team of the town of Kozloduy is based in the 1950s. Then the teams played in regional groups of Vratsa. In 1974 after the founding of the Kozloduy NPP is based on current club. First named Parva atomna, but then after Hristo Botev. The biggest success of the club is 12th place in the B PFG during season 1976–1977. The team reaches 4 times to B PFG.

In 2016 the team returned to its original name Parva Atomna Kozloduy. Since the club was relegated in the end of the 2015–16 season, they were merged with Dunav Selanovtsi and joined the newly formed Bulgarian Third League. The team started with 15 players from the previous team.

=== Crest history ===
2016–present

== Current squad ==
As of 1 September 2011 Note: Flags indicate national team as defined under FIFA eligibility rules; some limited exceptions apply. Players may hold more than one non-FIFA nationality.

| No. / Pos. / Nation / Player | No. / Pos. / Nation / Player |

== Stadium ==
The Hristo Botev stadium was built in 1970 with only one stand, which is filled with benches. After modernization in 2008, the facility achieved a decent standard for the amateur football groups. Current capacity for the stadium is 3,000 people.

== Past seasons ==
| Season | League | Place | W | D | L | GF | GA | Pts | Bulgarian Cup |
|---|---|---|---|---|---|---|---|---|---|
| 2009–10 | V AFG (III) | 5 | 13 | 7 | 8 | 52 | 39 | 46 | not qualified |
| 2010–11 | V AFG | 2 | 19 | 4 | 7 | 57 | 16 | 61 | not qualified |
| 2011–12 | V AFG | 3 | 19 | 4 | 7 | 78 | 24 | 61 | Second round |
| 2012–13 | V AFG | 2 | 15 | 4 | 3 | 46 | 15 | 49 | not qualified |
| 2013–14 | V AFG | 9 | 9 | 9 | 12 | 45 | 50 | 36 | not qualified |
| 2014–15 | V AFG | 12 | 5 | 6 | 15 | 31 | 45 | 31 | not qualified |
| 2015–16 | V AFG | 15 | 4 | 3 | 23 | 23 | 65 | 15 | not qualified |
| 2016–17 | Third League (III) | 8 | 10 | 5 | 13 | 43 | 56 | 35 | not qualified |
| 2017–18 | Third League | 5 | 15 | 7 | 8 | 45 | 29 | 52 | not qualified |
Green marks a season followed by promotion, red a season followed by relegation.
