= Erden (village) =

Coordinates: 43.4833°N 23.2892°E

Erden Ерден
- Village
- Interactive map of Erden
- Country: Bulgaria
- Province: Montana Province
- Municipality: Boychinovtsi
- Time zone: UTC+2 (EET)
  - Summer (DST): UTC+3 (EEST)

Erden is a village in Boychinovtsi Municipality, Montana Province, north-western Bulgaria.
