= OFC Elin Pelin =

Bulgarian football club

- Founded: 1923; 103 years ago
- Ground: Elin Pelin Stadium
- Capacity: 5,000
- Owner: Elin Pelin Municipality
- Chairman: Borislav Tonev
- Manager: Borislav Tonev
- League: Southwest Third League
- 2016–17: A OFG Sofia East, 1st (promoted)
Home colours	Away colours

OFC Elin Pelin (Bulgarian: ОФК Елин Пелин) is a Bulgarian football club based in the town of Elin Pelin, Sofia Province. It was founded in 1923 as Levski Elin Pelin.
