= FC Chernomorets Balchik =

Bulgarian football club

- Full name: Football Club Chernomorets Balchik
- Founded: 1918; 108 years ago
- Ground: Balchik Stadium
- Capacity: 2,618
- Owner: Balchik Municipality
- Head coach: Ivaylo Stanchev
- League: Third League
- 2025–26: Northeast Third League, 1st (declined promotion)
Home colours	Away colours

Chernomorets (Bulgarian: Черноморец) is a Bulgarian football club based in Balchik, competing in the Northeast Third League, the third tier of Bulgarian football. The team plays its home games at the local Balchik Stadium with 2,618 seats.

== History ==
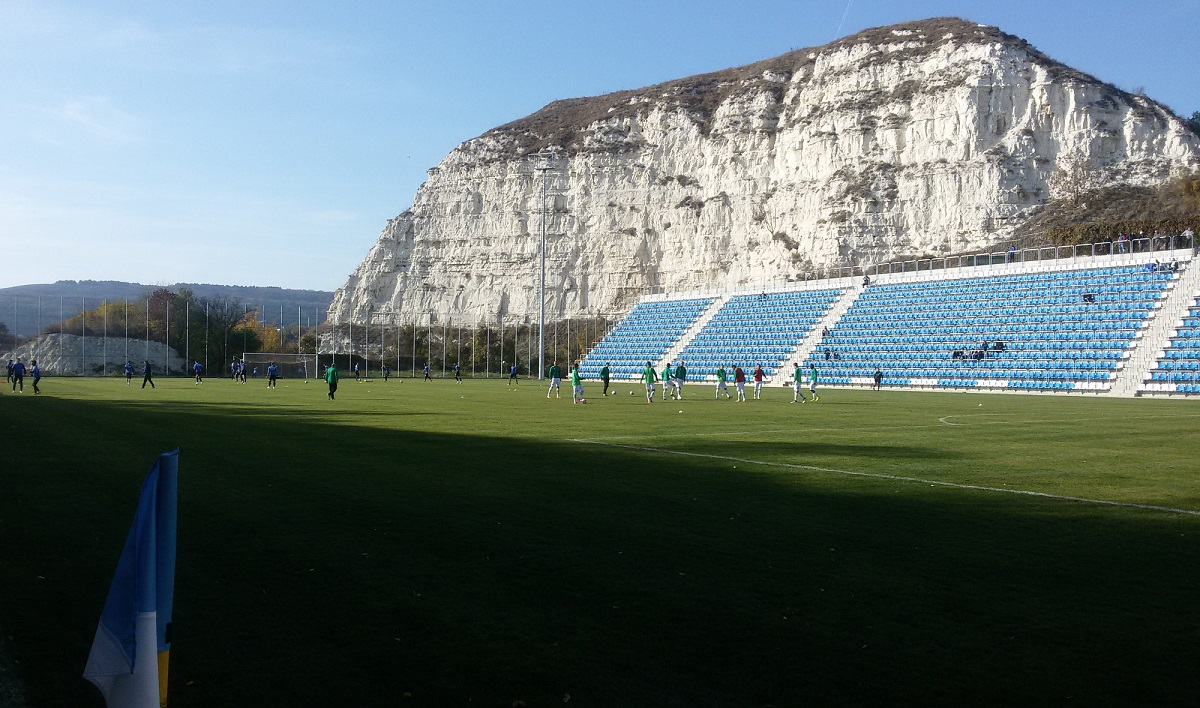
Balchik Stadium

Chernomorets were founded as Sport Club Strela in late 1918 by English and Italian soldiers after World War I. The team finally became known as Chernomorets in 1957.

In its history, Chernomorets has played mainly in the Bulgarian amateur divisions. Until the 1976/77 season, the team participated at most in the third Bulgarian division but gained promotion to the B Group for the 1977/78 season. The next season was not so successful and the team was relegated back to the third division (The club finishing in 17th place in the group).

Chernomorets qualified for the second time in its history for the second division by finishing in 3rd place in North-Eastern V Group in the 2007–08 season. In this period, in the club worked as an assistant coach former famous football player Iliyan Kiryakov.

Chernomorets withdrew from B PFG in February 2011 due to suffering from finance debts.

Between 9 November 2014 and 27 March 2016, Chernomorets won 37 consecutive games in the third division. The club sent a letter to the Guinness Book of World Records as a jest for its achievement.

In the 2015–16 season, the team finished first and won promotion to the B Group after five years of absence, but on 12 June 2016, they announced that would stay in the V Group and won't compete in the professional tier due to financial reasons. Next season, Chernomorets finished first once more, but this time the team accepted participation in the Second League. Chernomorets managed to remain three seasons in the Second League, but the team was eventually plagued by financial problems in 2020 and was disqualified during the 2019–20 season and demoted back to the Third League. After three years in the third league, Chernomorets again managed to gain promotion to the second league for the 2023–24 season under head coach Martin Hristov losing only a single game and conceding only 13 goals having the best defence and attack in the league simultaneously.

== Honours ==
- Second League:
  - 7th place: 2018–19
- Third League:
  - Winners (4): 2015–16, 2016–17, 2022–23, 2025–26
- Bulgarian Cup:
  - Round of 16 (2): 2018–19, 2020–21
- Cup of Bulgarian Amateur Football League:
  - Winners (1): 2016–17
  - Runners-up (3): 2015–16, 2019–20, 2024–25

== Players ==
=== Current squad ===
As of 27 March 2025

Note: Flags indicate national team as defined under FIFA eligibility rules; some limited exceptions apply. Players may hold more than one non-FIFA nationality.

No.	Pos.	Nation	Player
1	GK	BUL	Dimitar Iliev
2	DF	BUL	Yordan Radev
4	DF	BUL	Nikolay Dimitrov
5	MF	FRA	Joachim Amijekori (on loan from Fratria)
7	MF	BUL	Ivan Tomov
8	MF	BUL	Nikola Vladev
9	FW	BUL	Nikolay Trifonov
10	FW	BUL	Tolga Myurvet
11	FW	BUL	Martin Yanakiev
12	DF	BUL	Ivaylo Popov

No.	Pos.	Nation	Player
14	DF	BUL	Ivan Ivanov
15	FW	BUL	Preslav Slavkov
17	MF	BUL	Teodor Totev
18	DF	BUL	Radoslav Petrov
19	MF	BUL	Aleksandar Yordanov
20	FW	BUL	Martin Petkov
21	DF	BUL	Miroslav Nachev
22	FW	UKR	Andriy Kunitsyn (on loan from Fratria)
23	MF	BUL	Yordan Toskov
27	GK	BUL	Martin Hristov

For recent transfers, see Transfers summer 2026 and Transfers winter 2025–26.

== Notable players ==
Had international caps for their respective countries, held any club record, or had more than 100 league appearances. Players whose name is listed in bold represented their countries.

Bulgaria

- (Bulgaria) Daniel Georgiev
- (Bulgaria) Hristiyan Hristov
- (Bulgaria) Tsvetan Iliev
- (Bulgaria) Genadi Lugo
- (Bulgaria) Viktor Mitev
- (Bulgaria) **Mihail Venkov**

Asia

- (Tajikistan) **Nozim Babadjanov**

Africa

- (São Tomé and Príncipe) **Adjeil Neves**

== Past seasons ==
=== League positions ===
Season	League	Place	W	D	L	GF	GA	Pts	Bulgarian Cup
2011–12	V AFG (III)	10	8	7	13	43	34	36	not qualified
2012–13	V AFG	7	11	8	9	37	31	41	not qualified
2013–14	V AFG	13	8	2	20	39	63	26	not qualified
2014–15	V AFG	2	24	4	2	85	14	76	not qualified
2015–16	V AFG	1	24	1	1	79	14	73	First round
2016–17	Third League	1	24	4	0	67	9	76	First round
2017–18	Second League (II)	11	10	9	11	37	40	39	First round
2018–19	Second League	7	10	7	13	27	35	37	Second round
**Green marks a season followed by promotion, red a season followed by relegation.**
