= FC Balkan Botevgrad =

Bulgarian football club

FC Balkan
- Full name: Football Club Balkan
- Nickname: Forest Boys
- Founded: 1929; 97 years ago 29 September 2015; 11 years ago (refounded)
- Ground: Stadion Hristo Botev, Botevgrad
- Capacity: 8,000
- Manager: Ivan Redovski
- League: South-West Third League
- 2025–26: South-West Third League, 8th
Home colours	Away colours

FC Balkan Botevgrad (Bulgarian: ФК Балкан Ботевград, romanized: FK Balkan Botevgrad) is a Bulgarian football club based in the city of Botevgrad. The stadium of the club is "Hristo Botev" in Botevgrad with capacity of 8,000 people.

== History ==
The club was established in 1929 with the name "Stamen Panchev". In 1945, the club was renamed "Hristo Gurbov". Since 1947, the name is "Balkan". The main kit-colours of the team are green and white. Throughout its history, the club has participated in either the second or the third Bulgarian division. Currently the team is playing in the Southwest Third League. From 2005, the chairman of the club is Tihomir Ninov. In the 2007/2008 season, Balkan finished 2nd in the Bulgarian South-West V AFG, but won promotion, because of the changes from the 2008/2009 season in Bulgaria's West and East B Groups. From 2008, the chief executive is the famous Bulgarian footballer Marian Hristov. The club qualified at the 1/8 finals of the Bulgarian Cup 2008-09 after defeating PFC Belite orli Pleven with 2:0 and beating PFC Lokomotiv Mezdra with 1:0 to make it to the 1/8 finals of the competition. Unfortunately, "Balkan" was eliminated by CSKA Sofia after a score of 5:0.

== Honours ==
Second League

- Fifth place (2): 1978/1979, 2008/2009

Bulgarian Cup

- 1/8 finals (2): 1989, 2008

Cup of Bulgarian Amateur Football League

- Winners (1): 2019

== Current squad ==
As of 1 August 2019

Note: Flags indicate national team as defined under FIFA eligibility rules; some limited exceptions apply. Players may hold more than one non-FIFA nationality.

No.	Pos.	Nation	Player
1	GK	BUL	Kalin Donchev
2	DF	BUL	David Yordanov
3	DF	BUL	Emil Romanov
4	MF	BUL	Dimitar Velizarov
5	DF	BUL	Petar Vasilev
6	DF	BUL	Nikolay Hristozov
7	MF	BUL	Vladislav Georgiev
8	MF	BUL	Emil Kolev
9	FW	BUL	Kristiyan Kovachev
10	MF	BUL	Ivaylo Tsvetanov

No.	Pos.	Nation	Player
11	FW	BUL	Kristian Krastev
12	GK	BUL	Aleksandar Yordanov
13	FW	BUL	Yasen Georgiev
14	MF	BUL	Mark Vodiev
15	DF	BUL	Viktor Teodosiev
16	MF	BUL	Lyubomir Karanikolov
17	MF	BUL	Viktor Vasilev
18	MF	BUL	Ivaylo Boyadzhiev
19	DF	BUL	Zdravko Atanasov (captain)
20	MF	BUL	Martin Dimitrov

== Past seasons ==
Season	League	Place	W	D	L	GF	GA	Pts	Bulgarian Cup
2015–16	A RFG (IV)	1st	17	1	0	69	13	52	not qualified
2016–17	Third League (III)	12th	11	7	16	54	55	40	not qualified
2017–18	Third League	10th	10	11	13	49	60	41	not qualified
Green marks a season followed by promotion, red a season followed by relegation.
