= FC Inter Dobrich =

Bulgarian football club

Inter Dobrich
- Full name: Футболен Клуб „Интер“ Добрич; Football Club Inter Dobrich
- Founded: 2013; 12 years ago as Inter Plachidol
- Ground: Druzhba Stadium, training ground
- Owner: Varna University of Management
- Chairman: Todor Radev
- Manager: Veselin Ignatov
- League: A RFG
- 2023-2024: A RFG, 5th of 12
- Website: http://fc-inter.vum.bg/
Home colours	Away colours

Inter Dobrich (Bulgarian: Интер Добрич) is a Bulgarian football club from Dobrich, formed in 2013, which currently competes in Bulgaria's fourth division, the Dobrich Regional Football Group–East. Inter plays its home matches at the Druzhba Stadium, training ground, in Dobrich.

== History ==
=== 2013–present ===
The club was established in 2013, initially as a college football team under Varna's International University College (now Varna University of Management). In 2014, the football club appointed head coach Radoslav Boyanov and later that year, Inter Plachidol won the Dobrich Regional Football Group–East. Subsequently, the team proved to be successful in the play-offs against Orlovets 2008 and as a result they were promoted to the North-East V Group.

In 2016 the team was moved to Dobrich. On 10 October 2016 Inter left the Third League after their player Radoslav Georgiev was suspended from playing football for 1 year. All their matches for the 2016–17 season were annulled. In 2017, Veselin Ignatov has returned as head coach. Three years later, the team was promoted to the Third League, but they relegated in the same season. Since then, Inter plays in Dobrich Regional Football Group–East.

== Shirt and sponsors ==
The team's main colours are blue and black. The team is financially and institutionally supported by Varna University of Management.

Period	Kit manufacturer	Shirt partner
2013–2015	Unknown	None
2015–2022	(Germany) Saller	Inter – VUM
2022–2023	(Italy) Macron	Efbet
2023–	(Bulgaria) Vento	Inbet

== Personnel ==
=== Managers history ===
Dates	Name	Honours
2014–2016	(Bulgaria) Radoslav Boyanov	A RFG, 1st place (1)
2017–	(Bulgaria) Veselin Ignatov	–

== Past seasons ==
Season	League	Place	W	D	L	GF	GA	Pts
2013–14	A RFG (IV)	9	7	2	13	38	75	23
2014–15	A RFG	1	15	2	1	70	11	47
2015–16	V Group (III)	6	11	5	10	34	33	38
2016–17	Third League	13	0 (2)	0 (1)	0 (5)	0 (3)	0 (16)	0 (7)
2017–18	A RFG (IV)	6	9	1	10	34	31	28
2018–19	A RFG	4	12	1	11	57	46	37
2019–20	A RFG	5	6	1	4	28	16	19
2020–21	Third League (III)	14	2	1	25	22	126	8
2021-22	A RFG (IV)	7	6	2	10	40	48	20
2022-23	A RFG	7	6	4	10	54	49	22
2023-24	A RFG	5	12	0	10	49	42	36
Green marks a season followed by promotion, red a season followed by relegation.
