= OFC Karnobat =

Bulgarian football club

Karnobat
- Full name: Obshtinski Football Club Karnobat
- Ground: Gradski Stadium
- Capacity: 3,000
- Chairman: Teodor Ivanov
- Manager: Georgi Kaloyanov
- League: South-East Third League
- 2020–21: South-East Third League, 14th
Home colours	Away colours

OFC Karnobat (Bulgarian: ОФК Карнобат) is a Bulgarian association football club based in Karnobat, currently playing in the South-East Third League, the third level of Bulgarian football.

== Current squad ==
As of 1 September 2019

Note: Flags indicate national team as defined under FIFA eligibility rules; some limited exceptions apply. Players may hold more than one non-FIFA nationality.

No.	Pos.	Nation	Player
1	GK	BUL	Daniel Zhelev
3	DF	BUL	Dimitar Donchev (captain)
4	DF	BUL	Ivan Kapitanov
5	DF	BUL	Denislav Minchev
7	DF	BUL	Milen Stoyanov
8	MF	BUL	Hyusein Sadula
9	FW	BUL	Dimitar Petrov
10	MF	BUL	Georgi Kaloyanov
11	FW	BUL	Petar Kolev
12	GK	BUL	Borislav Totev
18	DF	BUL	Stoyan Kalev

No.	Pos.	Nation	Player
19	MF	BUL	Plamen Kirov
22	GK	BUL	Krasen Atanasov
23	MF	BUL	Plamen Dimitrov
24	DF	BUL	Georgi Binev
27	MF	BUL	Anton Atanasov
29	DF	BUL	Zhivko Komelov
67	DF	BUL	Trendafil Momchilov
69	DF	BUL	Stoyan Kalpakliev
77	MF	BUL	Stoyko Kolev
89	MF	BUL	Yasen Tuzakov
