= FC Germanea Sapareva Banya =

Bulgarian football club

Germaneya Sapareva Banya
- Full name: Football Club Germanea
- Nickname: The Blue Submarine
- Founded: 2008; 18 years ago
- Ground: Sapareva Banya
- Capacity: 500
- Owner: Sapareva Banya Municipality
- Chairman: Tsvetan Vidinski
- Head coach: Asen Neshev
- League: South-West Third League
- 2024–25]]: A Regional Kyustendil, 1st (promoted)
Home colours	Away colours

FC Germaneya (Bulgarian: ФК Германея) is a Bulgarian football club based in Sapareva Banya. Founded in 2008, and currently plays in Third League, the third tier of Bulgarian football. Germaneya's home ground is the Sapareva Banya Stadium, which has a capacity of 500 spectators.

== History ==
Germaneya was established in 2008. For a long time it was part of Third League, until 2019, when it relegated to 4th league. In 2021 the team was dissolved.

In June 2024 the team was restored and took over by Tsvetan Vidinski as chairman. Vidinski spend his last nine years leading Marek Dupnitsa, helping the team to be restored and return to second league. In August 2024 Asen Neshev was announced as the manager of the team. On 10 October 2024 the team won over the Third League leader FC Kyustendil for the Cup of AFL. On 12 June 2025, the team officially returned to Third League, after winning their league and the promote qualifications.

== Current squad ==
As of 31 June 2025 Note: Flags indicate national team as defined under FIFA eligibility rules; some limited exceptions apply. Players may hold more than one non-FIFA nationality.

No.	Pos.	Nation	Player
1	GK	BUL	Hristiyan Aleksandrov
3	DF	BUL	Svetoslav Sokolov
5	DF	BUL	Teodor Todorov
7	MF	BUL	Bozhidar Vasev
8	MF	BUL	Daniel Georgiev
9	FW	BUL	Robertin Atanasov
10	MF	BUL	Ivan Ribarski
11	MF	BUL	Oleg Govedarski
12	GK	BUL	Ivaylo Krumov
13	DF	BUL	Slavi Nakov

No.	Pos.	Nation	Player
14	MF	BUL	Daniel Stoyanov
15	DF	BUL	Ivaylo Chatov
16	MF	BUL	Kasiyan Ivanov
17	DF	BUL	Veselin Georgiev
18	FW	BUL	Steven Angelov
19	DF	BUL	Ivaylo Zhivkov
21	MF	BUL	Ivan Zlatkov
23	MF	BUL	Antoan Georgiev
24	MF	BUL	Johnny Lleshaj

== Seasons ==
=== Detailed season history ===
Results of league and cup competitions by season
Season	League											Bulgarian Cup	Other competitions		Top goalscorer
Season	Division	Level	P	W	D	L	F	A	GD	Pts	Pos	Bulgarian Cup	Other competitions		Top goalscorer
2024–25	A Regional Kyustendil	4	18	18	0	0	89	4	+85	54	1st ↑	DNQ	Cup of AFL	QF	
2025–26	Third League	3										TBA	Cup of AFL		

=== Key ===
- GS = Group stage
- QF = Quarter-finals
- SF = Semi-finals

Champions	Runners-up	Promoted	Relegated
