= FC Botev Lukovit =

Bulgarian football club

Botev Lukovit
- Full name: Football Club Botev-99 Lukovit
- Nickname: The Tigers
- Founded: 1 September 1999; 26 years ago
- Ground: City Stadium Lukovit
- Capacity: 3 000
- Chairman: Ivan Ivanov
- Manager: Ivaylo Petkov
- League: North-West Third League
- 2017–18: Third League, 13th
Home colours	Away colours

FC Botev Lukovit (Bulgarian: Ботев (Луковит)) is a Bulgarian football club from Lukovit, currently playing in the Bulgarian "A" RFG Lovech. The stadium of the club is The City Stadium in Lukovit with capacity of 3,000 people.

== History ==
Botev Lukovit Football Club was founded in 1933, but in 1995 due to lack of funds the club wound up.

Is restored again on 1 September 1999 and included in the Lovech Regional championship or the Fourth level of the Bulgarian football.

Management Board decided to direct their activities to the generation of adolescents and directs its activities to work with children. In the club are recorded 50 children divided into two groups: training group – (from 9 to 11 years), children (12–14 years) and adolescents aged senior (15–19) in the Regional Championship.

Children's age group for the season 2000–2001 finished in the first place in their league. One of the big successes achieved in children participating was in the International tournament "Danone", when the children of Botev Lukovit reached the final in Sofia. By the way they eliminated teams like Litex Lovech, Lokomotiv Gorna Oryahovitsa and Etar Veliko Tarnovo.

Four of the children – Rosen Banov, Vladislav Simeonov, Milen Tonev and Plamen Stanev were included in the national team "Danone" – 2000, for the international finals of the tournament on stadium "Park de Prince" in Paris.

For season 2013/2014 the team won the right to play in the Bulgarian North-West V AFG.

=== Successes ===
- 2nd in Central "V" Group in 1982
- 1st in "A" RFG Lovech in 1987, 1988, 2004
- 1st in the Christmas football tournament for children in Lovech – 2007, 2008
- 1/32 Final of the Bulgarian Cup – 1978
- Botev Lukovit – Litex Lovech 3:0 – 1999
- 3rd in North-West V AFG in 2013–14
- Botev Lukovit – Spartak Pleven 1:0 – 15 September 2013
- Botev Lukovit – SFC Etar Veliko Tarnovo 2:0 – 23 May 2014

== Current squad ==
As of 11 August 2017 Note: Flags indicate national team as defined under FIFA eligibility rules; some limited exceptions apply. Players may hold more than one non-FIFA nationality.

No.	Pos.	Nation	Player
1	GK	BUL	Vasil Todorov
2	DF	BUL	Stoyko Krastev
4	DF	BUL	Emil Grozev
6	FW	BUL	Milen Tonev
-	MF	BUL	Danail Yozov
-	DF	BUL	Teodor Bukoev
-	DF	BUL	Mitko Krasimirov
-	MF	BUL	Valcho Georgiev
-	DF	BUL	Ivaylo Marinov
