= FC Suvorovo =

Bulgarian football club

Suvorovo
- Full name: Football Club Suvorovo
- Founded: 1920; 105 years ago
- Ground: Suvorovo Stadium, Suvorovo
- Capacity: 1,000
- Chairman: Pavlin Paraskevov
- Manager: Martin Hristov
- League: North-East Third League
- 2018–19: North-East Third League, 2nd
Home colours	Away colours

Football Club Suvorovo are a Bulgarian association football club based in Suvorovo, Varna Province, currently playing in the North-East Third League, the third level of Bulgarian football.

== Current squad ==
As of 1 September 2019 Note: Flags indicate national team as defined under FIFA eligibility rules; some limited exceptions apply. Players may hold more than one non-FIFA nationality.

No.	Pos.	Nation	Player
1	GK	BUL	Kostadin B. Ivanov
2	DF	BUL	Teodor Kirchev
3	DF	BUL	Georgi Bombov
4	MF	BUL	Kostadin H. Ivanov
7	MF	BUL	Nikola Naydenov
8	FW	BUL	Daniel Dimitrov
9	FW	BUL	Lyubomir Mihalev
10	MF	BUL	Nikola Vasilev (captain)
11	DF	BUL	Nikolay Iliev

No.	Pos.	Nation	Player
12	GK	BUL	Nedelcho Dobrev
13	DF	BUL	Danail Borisov
14	MF	BUL	Zhivko Boyadzhiev
16	DF	BUL	Stanislav Ivanov
17	MF	BUL	Svetoslav Pavlov
18	MF	BUL	Milen Nikolov
33	MF	BUL	Milen Stefanov
81	FW	BUL	Aleksandar Chukanski
88	MF	BUL	Nikola Arnaudov
