= FC Benkovski Byala =

Bulgarian football club

Benkovski
- Full name: FC Benkovski Byala
- Founded: 1931; 95 years ago
- Ground: Georgi Benkovski
- Capacity: 3000
- League: A OFG Ruse
- 2024–25: 5th
Home colours	Away colours

FC Benkovski (Bulgarian: ФК Бенковски) is a football club based in Byala, Bulgaria. Its home stadium Georgi Benkovski has a capacity of 3000 seats. Club colors are blue and red.
