= Stadion Druzhba =

Stadium in Bulgaria

- Interactive map of Stadion Druzhba
- Location: Dobrich, Bulgaria
- Coordinates: 43°33′22″N 27°49′36″E
- Owner: Dobrich Municipality
- Operator: PFC Dobrudzha Dobrich
- Capacity: 12,000
- Surface: Grass
- Field size: 100 X 65

Construction
- Built: End of the 1950s
- Opened: September 25, 1960
- Cost: 87 000 000 BGN

Tenants
- Dobrudzha Dobrich (1960–); Inter Dobrich (2013–); Riltsi Dobrich (2021–)

Stadion Druzhba (Bulgarian: Стадион „Дружба", English: Druzhba Stadium, lit. 'Friendship Stadium') is a football stadium in Dobrich, Bulgaria, built in the late 1950s. Donations amounting to about 87 million BGN covered the construction costs. The stadium was officially opened on September 25, 1960. The first match was between the teams of Dobrudzha Dobrich and the Romanian side Progresul București, which ended with 0–1 loss for the hosts. The capacity of the stadium is 12,000 seats.

The stadium's main host is Dobrudzha Dobrich, but since 2013 it has also hosted Inter Dobrich matches when the team played in Third League. In 2021 Riltsi Dobrich also began playing their matches in Druzhba Stadium.

== Technical data ==
- Capacity: 12,500 seated
- Seat distribution:

- 4 stands - 10 sectors - 2 official boxes - 5 entrances

- Field dimensions: 100 m x 65 m
- Floodlight: None
