= OFC Gigant Saedinenie =

Bulgarian football club

Gigant
- Full name: OFC Gigant
- Founded: 1946
- Ground: Saedinenie Stadium
- Capacity: 5 000
- Manager: Nikolay Aleksiev
- League: South-East Third League
- 2022–23: South-East Third League, 3rd
Home colours	Away colours

OFC Gigant (Bulgarian: ОФК Гигант) is a Bulgarian association football club based in Saedinenie, Plovdiv Province, currently playing in the South-East Third League, the third level of Bulgarian football.

== History ==
The club was founded in 1946 and spent most of their early years in the country's lower divisions. In 2007 they finished in 1st place in the "A" RFG Plovdiv and once again returned the South East "V" group, where they have remained since.

== Current squad ==
As of 1 September 2019

Note: Flags indicate national team as defined under FIFA eligibility rules; some limited exceptions apply. Players may hold more than one non-FIFA nationality.

No.	Pos.	Nation	Player
1	GK	BUL	Ivan Avramov
2	DF	BUL	Georgi Yotovski
3	DF	BUL	Tsvetan Yotov
4	DF	BUL	Teodor Gishin
5	DF	BUL	Nikolay Domakinov
6	MF	BUL	Dimitar Rusev
7	MF	BUL	Zapryan Zapryanov
8	MF	BUL	Stoyan Slavkov
9	MF	BUL	Veselin Filipov
10	MF	BUL	Miroslav Radev

No.	Pos.	Nation	Player
11	DF	BUL	Nikola Marin
12	GK	BUL	Pavlin Evtimov
13	MF	SRB	Lazar Mišić
15	DF	BUL	Atanas Kumanov
17	MF	BUL	Petyo Chomashki
18	MF	BUL	Simeon Raykov
19	FW	BUL	Stoimen Totkov
20	MF	BUL	Georgi Nikolov
69	GK	BUL	Stanimir Ivanov
99	FW	BUL	Todor Todorov
