= OFC Bdin Vidin =

Bulgarian football club

Bdin
- Full name: OFC Bdin - 1923 (Vidin)
- Nickname: Бдинци / Bdintsi
- Founded: 1923; 103 years ago
- Ground: Georgi Benkovski, Vidin
- Capacity: 15,000
- Manager: Martin Metodiev
- League: Northwest Third League
- 2025–26: 2025–26 Northwest Third League, 4th
Home colours	Away colours

OFC Bdin (Bulgarian: ОФК Бдин) is a Bulgarian football club based in Vidin, currently (season 2025–2026) playing in the Third Professional League, the third level of Bulgarian football. Its home stadium "Georgi Benkovski" has a capacity of 15 000 seats. The club color is red shirts and shorts.

== History ==
=== The Beginning ===
OFC Bdin Vidin is a football club whose origins date back to 1923.

During the 1920s, several small football teams existed in Vidin. In 1920, SC “Bdin” was founded, later changing its name to “Bononia” before eventually becoming “Bdin” again. In the “Kaleto” district, the team “Victoria” was established. The large Jewish and Turkish communities in Vidin also had their own teams – “Jabotinsky” and “Turan.” Other teams such as “Razvitie,” “Sportist,” “Bulgaria,” and others also existed.

These teams competed fiercely in the city football championship, while Vidin’s proximity to Romania and Serbia allowed them to play international matches as well. In 1923, when the Bulgarian National Sports Federation (BNSF) was established in Sofia, it required the small neighborhood clubs to merge. These first football clubs in Vidin laid the foundations of organized football in the city and became the basis of today’s “Bdin.”

May 20, 1923, is the exact date on which SC “Bdin” was officially registered following the aforementioned merger. We consider this the birth date of our club. This history is presented with the assistance of the State Archives branch in Vidin.

From the beginning of the Bulgarian championship in 1924, Vidin teams actively participated in the elimination stages, although without notable success.

=== The 1930s ===
The first breakthrough came in 1930. At that time, the championship was still held in a direct elimination format. The Vidin team, then named “Victoria 23,” traveled to Veliko Tarnovo, where they played against the local “Slava” team (according to statisticians, the Veliko Tarnovo side may also have been known as “Victoria” or “Trapezitsa”) and lost 6–2.

The following season, “Victoria 23” once again entered the championship, this time visiting another team named “Slava” from Yambol. They again suffered defeat, this time by 3–1.

In the following years, the Vidin club did not participate in the national championship level, but football in Vidin continued to develop. “Victoria 23” returned to the championship in 1936. The Vidin side eliminated “Pobeda 26” Pleven at home with a convincing 4–2 victory. However, in the next round, the draw paired them against the future national champion, Sofia’s “Slavia,” and they lost 6–1 in Vidin.

In 1937, the National Football Division and District Sports Regions were established. That same year, “Bdin” played in the preliminary eliminations and lost 3–0 to “Levski” in Ruse.

=== The 1940s ===
A period followed in which “Victoria 23” became the leading team in Vidin. The club competed in the Vidin Sports Region but failed to reach the national elimination stages. In 1940, however, under the name “Bdin,” the Vidin side successfully entered the King’s Cup tournament. They defeated “Tsar Krum” Byala Slatina 1–0 and advanced to the quarterfinals, where they faced one of the eventual finalists, “Levski” Ruse, losing 4–1.

The following year, the Vidin team again reached the quarterfinals. In the opening match, “Bdin” eliminated “Belite Orli” Pleven with a 5–3 victory. Interestingly, during these years, clubs from Vardar Macedonia and Aegean Thrace also participated in the championship and the King’s Cup, as these territories were under Bulgarian administration during World War II.

In the quarterfinals, the draw paired “Bdin” with the eventual King’s Cup winner, Sofia’s “AS 23.” The Vidin side lost 3–0 at home.

Then came 1946, when under the name “Benkovski,” the Vidin team achieved success both in the national championship, where they finished third, and in the newly established Soviet Army Cup tournament. In the Round of 16, “Benkovski” defeated “Lokomotiv” Mezdra 3–0, but in the quarterfinals luck again abandoned the Vidin side. Their opponent was the future cup winner “Levski” Sofia, and after a hard-fought match, “Benkovski” narrowly lost 1–0.

In the memorable 1948/49 season, “Benkovski” became one of the founding clubs of the Republican Football Division, the predecessor of the Bulgarian “A” Group. Ten clubs founded the division: Sofia’s “Levski,” “CDNV,” “Slavia,” “Lokomotiv,” and “Spartak,” along with “Botev” Varna, “Botev” Burgas, “Slavia-Chengelov” Plovdiv, “Marek” Dupnitsa, and “Benkovski” Vidin.

The Vidin side began the season under the name “Benkovski-Sportist,” but reverted to “Benkovski” before the spring half-season. “Benkovski” finished ninth in the standings with 2 wins, 4 draws, and 12 losses, scoring 13 goals and conceding 35, which resulted in relegation.

In 1949, “Benkovski” also performed well in the Soviet Army Cup tournament. They received a bye in the Round of 16, but in the quarterfinals they faced an old rival, “Slavia,” and lost 4–0 in Sofia.

=== The 1950s ===
The 1949/50 championship season began normally, but after only three rounds of the autumn phase, the competition was suspended. On August 27, 1949, the Central Committee of the Bulgarian Communist Party decided to reorganize sports in Bulgaria according to the Soviet model. On September 27, the Supreme Committee for Physical Culture and Sports implemented this restructuring.

Following the Soviet system, voluntary sports organizations were established according to professional sectors:

DSO Akademik – for university professors, students, and scientific workers. DSO Dynamo – for workers in communications, light industry, and food production. DSO Energiya (later renamed DSO Torpedo) – for transport, heavy industry, electrification, and mining workers. DSO Spartak – for employees of the Ministry of Internal Affairs. DSO Stroitel – for workers in construction, healthcare, agriculture, forestry, and labor troops. DSO Cherveno Zname (“Red Banner”) – for local administration, trade, culture, banking, and insurance workers.

Military sports clubs connected to the Bulgarian People’s Army also continued to exist.

It was decided that the new championship would follow the Soviet “spring-autumn” system beginning the next year.

For the 1950 season, the Vidin club was renamed “Stroitel” by party directive and competed successfully in the Northern “B” Republican Football Group, finishing fifth with 8 wins, 3 draws, and 7 losses, with a goal difference of 26:24. Despite this respectable performance, the club was relegated under unclear criteria.

The following season, a unified “B” Republican Football Group was created, while “Stroitel” Vidin competed in the district league. The team finished first and returned to the “B” Group under the new name “Cherveno Zname.”

In the unified “B” Group in 1952, “Cherveno Zname” Vidin finished ninth with 8 wins, 6 draws, and 10 losses, scoring 26 goals and conceding 27.

After the season, Bulgarian football underwent another reorganization. Five regional “B” Groups were created:

Northeastern Northwestern Southeastern Southwestern Sofia Region

Each consisted of 12 teams.

In 1952, the Vidin club also participated in the Soviet Army Cup. In the preliminary round, they defeated “Torpedo” Pleven 3–1 at home, but in the next round they lost 2–1 after extra time to “VVS” Sofia.

In 1953, “Cherveno Zname” Vidin competed in the Northwestern “B” Group and finished sixth with 7 wins, 7 draws, and 8 losses, with a goal difference of 32:30.

The following season, the club finished seventh with 8 wins, 6 draws, and 8 losses, scoring 25 goals and conceding 21. That season was also memorable because “Urozhay” Novo Selo joined the group, creating the first district derby at “B” Group level.

The 1955 season proved exceptional for “Cherveno Zname” Vidin. In fierce competition with “Lokomotiv” Gorna Oryahovitsa, the Vidin side finished first in the group with a two-point advantage. The team recorded 10 wins, 11 draws, and only 1 loss, with a goal difference of 29:13.

According to the regulations, the five “B” Group champions and the 11th-placed team from the “A” Group, “Zavod 12” Sofia, entered qualification playoffs for promotion to the “A” Group. Unfortunately, “Cherveno Zname” finished fifth in the playoff tournament with only one win, two draws, and two losses.

That same year, the team focused primarily on the league, as they were eliminated early from the Soviet Army Cup by “DNA” Ruse, losing 2–1 away from home.

In 1956, Bulgarian football was reorganized again. Two additional “B” Groups — Northern and Southern — were formed, increasing the total number to seven “B” Groups.

That season, the Vidin side finished fourth with 12 wins, 2 draws, and 8 losses, scoring 34 goals and conceding 26.

Another major change followed the next year. The seven “B” Groups were abolished and replaced with only two:

Northern “B” Group Southern “B” Group

Only the top clubs from the seven groups retained their places, while the rest were relegated to district leagues.

Before the season began, the Bulgarian Union for Physical Culture and Sports (BSFS) was established as the state authority overseeing sports in Bulgaria. The former voluntary sports organizations were reorganized territorially rather than by industry sector. As a result, many clubs regained their traditional names or adopted new ones.

Thus, “Cherveno Zname” once again became “Benkovski.”

During the 1957 season in the increasingly competitive Northern “B” Group, “Benkovski” showed inconsistent form but still finished seventh with 11 wins, 9 draws, and 10 losses, scoring 34 goals and conceding 26.

The 1958 “A” Group season served as a transitional championship as Bulgarian football switched from the spring-autumn format back to the autumn-spring system. Teams played only one match against each opponent during the spring half-season. Therefore, no promotions or relegations occurred in either the “A” Group or the two “B” Groups.

Regardless, “Benkovski” finished fifth that season.

In the 1958/59 campaign, “Benkovski” performed well and finished 11th, but due to yet another restructuring, the team was relegated. The Vidin side collected 30 points, just two fewer than ninth-placed “Botev” Vratsa, who had 32.

As a result, from the 1959/60 season onward, the two “B” Groups were merged into one unified “B” Republican Football Group. Teams finishing between 9th and 16th in the Northern and Southern “B” Groups were relegated.

At the third level of Bulgarian football, four Zonal Football Groups were established, while the former District Football Groups became the fourth tier of Bulgarian football.

=== The 1960s ===
“Benkovski” spent two seasons competing in the Zonal Groups, and during the 1960/61 season the team finished first in its group and earned promotion back to the “B” Group.

On June 18, 1961, the newly built “Georgi Benkovski” Stadium in Vidin was officially opened.

During the 1961/62 season, luck once again helped “Benkovski” avoid relegation. The club finished in 15th place, second from bottom and technically within the relegation zone, but Bulgarian football underwent yet another restructuring.

Starting with the 1962/63 season, the unified “B” Republican Football Group was divided into two territorial divisions. As a result, there were no relegated teams from the “B” Group that season.

Before this restructuring, during the 1961/62 campaign, “Benkovski” also reached the Round of 16 in the Soviet Army Cup, where they were eliminated dramatically. In the Round of 32, “Benkovski” defeated “Raketa” Gabrovo twice — 1–0 and 4–1 — to qualify for the next stage. There they faced “Levski.” After a hard-fought 0–0 draw in Vidin, the Vidin side lost narrowly 1–0 in Sofia.

Competing in the Northern “B” Group during the 1962/63 season, “Benkovski” Vidin became one of the leading teams in the division. The club finished fifth out of 19 teams with 15 wins, 11 draws, and 10 losses, scoring 53 goals and conceding 41.

However, in the 1963/64 season, the Vidin side struggled to avoid relegation from the Northern “B” Group. They finished 12th with 29 points, only one point above the relegation zone. That season, “Benkovski” recorded 13 wins, 3 draws, and 18 losses, with a goal difference of 43:49.

The following season, however, the team played more consistently and finished comfortably in seventh place. “Benkovski” became a strong home side and achieved 15 wins, 4 draws, and 15 losses, with a goal difference of 59:52.

The 1966/67 championship proved very successful for “Benkovski,” although the club once again failed to finish first. The Vidin side placed third with 43 points, eight behind leaders “Spartak” Pleven. The team achieved an impressive 17 wins and 9 draws while suffering 10 defeats. “Benkovski’s” powerful attack scored 63 goals, making it the second-highest scoring team in the division, surpassed only by Pleven’s side by a single goal.

By this point, four seasons had passed without changes to the second-tier league structure, and “Benkovski” had firmly established itself as one of the most stable teams in the Northern “B” Group.

In the 1967/68 season, “Benkovski” finished sixth with 13 wins, 8 draws, and 13 losses. Once again, the Vidin side ranked second in goals scored with 51 goals, behind only champions “Dunav” Ruse.

Then came the exceptionally strong 1968/69 season for “Benkovski,” but once again the team narrowly missed promotion. They finished second in the group with 46 points, five behind leaders “Etar” Veliko Tarnovo.

That season, the Vidin attack was formidable. The team scored an incredible 70 goals — the highest total in the division. “Benkovski” achieved 20 wins, 6 draws, and only 8 losses, but the dream of reaching the “A” Group slipped away once more.

The 1969/70 season marked the final year in which the Vidin club competed under the name “Benkovski.” The team finished in an impressive fourth place with 14 wins, 9 draws, and 11 losses, posting a goal difference of 52:42.

=== The 1970s ===
The club changed its name to "Bdin" prior to the 1970/71 championship season. Throughout that time, the club was hosting its matches at the Benkovski Stadium, which had a home crowd that always chanted "Bdintsi."

Under the name “Bdin,” the Vidin side caused a sensation in the league — but once again finished second. After a thrilling title race filled with dramatic twists, “ZhSK-Spartak” Varna finished first with 54 points, while “Bdin” followed with 51.

The “Bdin” players dominated many opponents, ending the season with 23 wins, 5 draws, and only 6 losses, but even that proved insufficient for promotion. Their goal difference was equally impressive: 63 scored and 27 conceded.

That same season, “Bdin” also enjoyed success in the Soviet Army Cup. In the Round of 32, the club eliminated “Laskov” Yambol with a 2–0 victory and advanced to the group stage format then used in the tournament.

The draw placed the Vidin side in a group with:

future cup winners “Levski-Spartak” “Chardafon-Orlovets” Gabrovo “Dunav” Ruse

“Bdin” lost 2–0 to both “Levski-Spartak” and “Chardafon-Orlovets,” but played an entertaining match against “Dunav,” losing 3–2.

In 1971/72, the Vidin side remained among the strongest teams in the group. They finished fifth with 16 wins, 7 draws, and 11 losses, scoring 49 goals and conceding 35.

The 1972/73 season would become particularly memorable. “Bdin” once again finished second, but together with “Chavdar” Troyan, “Ludogorets” Razgrad, and “Hristo Karpachev” Lovech, the club was expelled from the league.

The Bulgarian Football Union cited only “actions incompatible with sporting morality and violations of regulations” as the reason.

“Bdin” had achieved second place with 19 wins, 8 draws, and 7 losses, while recording an excellent goal difference of 54:20.

That year, “Bdin” once again reached the group stage of the cup competition. In a memorable match at “Benkovski” Stadium, the Vidin side eliminated top-flight “Lokomotiv” Sofia 2–0 in the Round of 32.

In the group stage, however, they again encountered future trophy winners “CSKA – Septemvriysko Zname.” The group also included another finalist, “Beroe” Stara Zagora, as well as “ZhSK-Spartak” Varna.

Despite the difficult opposition, “Bdin” performed admirably:

narrowly losing 2–1 to CSKA fighting bravely in a 5–2 defeat against “Beroe” defeating the Varna side 2–0

In the following 1973/74 season, now competing in the “V” Group, “Bdin” naturally finished first and returned to the “B” Group for the 1974/75 season.

After this brief setback in the lower division, the club again established itself among the stronger teams, finishing fifth with 16 wins, 11 draws, and 11 losses, and a goal difference of 47:33.

In the Bulgarian Cup, “Bdin” again reached the group stage. The team eliminated “Pirin” Blagoevgrad 1–0 in Vidin before entering a group featuring:

“Levski-Spartak” “Spartak” Pleven “Akademik” Sofia

“Bdin” dramatically defeated “Spartak” Pleven 3–2 but lost to “Levski-Spartak” 3–0 and “Akademik” 2–0, resulting in elimination.

The 1975/76 season proved relatively calm and mid-table, with “Bdin” finishing ninth. The club recorded 16 wins, 9 draws, and 13 losses, scoring 43 goals and conceding 44.

The national cup, however, brought more excitement for the Vidin supporters. In the Round of 64, “Bdin” defeated local side “Asen Balkanski” Belogradchik 4–2 away from home.

In another dramatic match in Vidin, “Bdin” eliminated “Svetkavitsa” Targovishte 3–2 and advanced to the Round of 16.

The draw then brought future Bulgarian champions and cup finalists “CSKA-Septemvriysko Zname” to Vidin. In front of a packed “Benkovski” Stadium, the Sofia giants defeated “Bdin” 3–0.

The 1976/77 championship was once again highly competitive. Despite strong performances, “Bdin” failed to secure first place. The Vidin side finished third with 48 points, four behind champions “Cherno More” Varna.

The title race involved three clubs:

“Cherno More” “Etar” Veliko Tarnovo “Bdin”

“Cherno More” and “Etar” finished level on points, but the Varna side earned promotion thanks to a superior goal difference.

Once again, the supporters in Vidin were disappointed that “Bdin” narrowly missed promotion to the “A” Group. The club achieved 20 wins, 8 draws, and 10 losses, with a goal difference of 53:26.

The 1977/78 season followed a familiar script — “Bdin” finished second again and failed to gain promotion.

Around this time, a famous phrase emerged among supporters: “If two teams are promoted, Bdin will finish third; if three are promoted, Bdin will finish fourth…”

Nevertheless, the Vidin side enjoyed another excellent season:

21 wins 9 draws 9 losses

The attack was ruthless with 62 goals scored, while the defense was the best in the division, conceding only 32 goals.

Even so, “Spartak” Pleven finished first with 55 points, five ahead of “Bdin.”

The next season was calmer, with “Bdin” ending in 12th place after recording 15 wins, 6 draws, and 17 losses, with a goal difference of 50:41.

In 1979/80, “Bdin” again performed strongly but remained far from promotion to the “A” Group. The team finished fifth with 18 wins, 9 draws, and 15 losses, scoring 52 goals and conceding 42.

That season was dominated by the strong “Akademik” Sofia side, scoring 100 goals.

=== The 1980s ===
The following season, “Bdin” lost some of its momentum and finished in an unremarkable 16th place out of 22 teams in the division, only five points above the relegation zone. The Vidin side achieved 12 wins, 13 draws, and 17 losses, with a goal difference of 34:46.

Another disappointing season followed. In 1981/82, the winner of the group earned direct promotion to the “A” Group, while the runner-up entered a promotion playoff — and “Bdin” finished… third once again.

The Vidin club ended the season with 47 points, three behind second-placed “Shumen.” “Bdin” recorded 16 wins, 15 draws, and 11 losses, with a goal difference of 42:37.

In the Soviet Army Cup, one of the memorable derby matches between “Bdin” and “Botev” Vratsa took place at “Benkovski” Stadium in Vidin. The match was part of the Round of 32. Regular time ended 1–1, but in extra time the Vratsa side scored and eliminated “Bdin.”

The 1982/83 campaign remained controversial in club history because the football federation accused “Bdin” of match-fixing.

What actually happened was this: “Bdin” had assembled an exceptionally strong team and was defeating opponents consistently. Their attack was outstanding, scoring 66 goals. The Vidin side achieved 17 wins, 5 draws, and 12 losses, collecting 39 points and finishing second — a position that would normally qualify them for the promotion playoffs.

However, the federation concluded that there had been an attempt to manipulate the result of the match against “Dorostol” Silistra. As punishment, “Bdin” was docked six points, automatically removing the club from the playoff zone and allowing “Osam” Lovech to take their place.

As a result, despite their performances, “Bdin” officially finished only 10th in the standings.

Thus, a genuine opportunity for promotion was lost due either to poor judgment or a badly arranged agreement.

The strength of the “Bdin” squad that season was also demonstrated by the team’s impressive run to the quarterfinals of the Soviet Army Cup, which at the time was played alongside the newly created Cup of the People’s Republic of Bulgaria tournament.

Cup run:

Round of 32: defeated “Dimitrovgrad” 1–0 away Next round: eliminated “Sokol” (Benkovski district, Sofia) 1–0 away Round of 16: defeated “Spartak” Koynare 2–1 after extra time Quarterfinals: lost 4–1 to future cup winners “Lokomotiv” Plovdiv

The following season, the football federation introduced another restructuring that would eventually send “Bdin” into the “V” Group.

For many years, the “B” Republican Football Group had consisted of:

Northern “B” Group Southern “B” Group

each containing 18 teams.

Starting from the 1984/85 season, it was decided to create one unified “B” Group of 22 teams.

According to the new regulations:

The champions of the Northern and Southern “B” Groups were directly promoted to the “A” Group. The runners-up entered qualification playoffs against teams fighting to remain in the “A” Group. Teams finishing between 3rd and 8th place retained their places in the new unified “B” Group. Teams finishing between 9th and 12th entered relegation playoffs. Teams finishing between 13th and 18th were relegated to the “V” Group.

Unfortunately, “Bdin” finished in the fatal 13th place and was relegated.

Two difficult seasons in amateur football followed for the club.

In the 1984/85 season, “Bdin” failed to overcome “Lokomotiv” Gorna Oryahovitsa, who finished first and returned to the “B” Group.

However, during the 1985/86 season, nobody could stop the Vidin side, and “Bdin” earned promotion back to the unified “B” Group.

In the 1986/87 championship, the club’s primary goal was survival in what was then a very strong “B” Group — and they succeeded.

“Bdin” finished 11th with 36 points, three above the relegation zone. The team achieved:

15 wins 6 draws 17 losses

with a goal difference of 51:59.

The following season, “Bdin” once again became one of the stronger teams in the division and finished fifth with:

18 wins 5 draws 15 losses

and a goal difference of 53:45.

During the 1988/89 campaign, however, the team lost momentum and dropped to 13th place. Their record consisted of:

13 wins 11 draws 14 losses

with a goal difference of 41:50.

The year 1989 proved historic for Bulgaria politically and socially, and football was no exception.

The arrival of democracy transformed both public and sporting life. Major changes were approaching in the history of “Bdin.”

In the 1989/90 championship, “Bdin” enjoyed another strong season but still finished only fifth — despite the fact that three teams were promoted to the top division that year.

For much of the campaign, the Vidin side occupied second and third place while chasing promotion to the “A” Group. Ultimately, however, the top three spots were taken by:

“Yantra” Gabrovo “Minyor” Pernik “Haskovo”

“Bdin” finished with:

19 wins 7 draws 12 losses

scoring 62 goals and conceding 41, collecting 45 points — five fewer than third place.

=== The 1990s ===
The following season brought crisis and relegation to the “V” Group.

“Bdin” finished 17th, just below the relegation line. Throughout the season, the Vidin side fought hard, but with only 27 points they finished three points short of safety.

The campaign was weak:

only 9 wins 9 draws 18 losses

with a goal difference of 30:44.

However, one season was enough for “Bdin” to return immediately to the “B” Group. The club dominated the Northwestern “V” Group.

That season was also remembered for the presence of Romanian players and Romanian coach Nicolae Zamfir.

Cup campaign:

Second round: defeated “Storgozia” Pleven 2–0 Next round: eliminated “Yantra” Polski Trambesh 3–1 away Following round: advanced past “Druzhba” Professor Ishirkovo via two awarded 3–0 victories

In the Round of 16, “Bdin” faced top-flight side “Chernomorets” Burgas.

“Bdin” lost the first match in Burgas 2–0, but in the return leg, played before packed stands in Vidin, the team managed to equalize the aggregate score and force extra time and penalties.

Goalkeeper Vanyo Ivanov became the hero of the match:

he saved a penalty during regular time then saved three consecutive penalties in the shootout

Vidin erupted in celebration and eagerly awaited the next opponent: “Botev” Plovdiv, where the legendary Bozhidar Iskrenov-Gibonata was then finishing his career.

The first match in Vidin ended 0–0 after a highly respectable performance by “Bdin.” However, in the return leg, “Botev,” who eventually reached the tournament semifinals, eliminated the Vidin side with a 5–0 victory.

And so “Bdin” returned to the “B” Group — but the comeback proved disastrous.

In the 1992/93 season, “Bdin” finished last, in 20th place, but surprisingly avoided relegation.

The football authorities decided to split the “B” Group once again into:

Northern “B” Group Southern “B” Group

and therefore no teams were relegated that season.

“Bdin” struggled badly:

only 4 wins 9 draws 24 losses

The team scored just 25 goals while conceding 83.

The crisis continued during the 1993/94 season. A young “Bdin” squad finished last — 14th — in the Northern “B” Group.

The final statistics:

7 wins 3 draws 16 losses

with a goal difference of 24:47.

Still, another Vidin team would compete in the division the following season — the newly created “Lokomotiv” Vidin. However, “Lokomotiv” also finished near the bottom and was relegated before eventually ceasing to exist.

After “Bdin” dropped from the “B” Group in 1993/94, several difficult years followed in the third tier.

League finishes:

1994/95: 10th place in the Northwestern “V” Group 1996: 13th place 1997: 14th and bottom of the standings

However, the club avoided relegation because “Roman” and “Chumerna” Elena were expelled from the division.

During the 1997/98 season, “Bdin” merged with “Minyor” Koshava. Under the name “Bdin-Minyor,” the team achieved a respectable sixth-place finish.

In 1999, the club restored the name “Bdin” and enjoyed a strong season, finishing second with 65 points — though still 13 points behind champions “Vidima-Rakovski” Sevlievo.

“Bdin” entered the 1999/2000 season determined to return to professional football. However, the club’s fate was ultimately decided within the Bulgarian Football Union.

During the winter break, Toti Benchev — known as “The Great Combinator” and president of second-division side “Kremikovtsi” — attempted to save his financially troubled club after the metallurgical plant stopped funding football.

As a result, a merger created “Bdin-Kremikovtsi” in the “B” Group, while “Balkan” Belogradchik replaced “Bdin” in the Northwestern “V” Group.

Soon afterward:

all “Kremikovtsi” players left head coach Kiril Ivkov departed benefactor Toti Benchev became seriously ill

The situation became critical.

Young coach Stefan Yaramov took charge of “Bdin.” He gathered players from Vidin who had been playing for other clubs and added several new signings before beginning the spring half-season.

Before the merger, “Kremikovtsi” had:

4 wins 5 draws 6 losses

for a total of 17 points.

After the team moved to Vidin, another 21 points were collected during the spring campaign through:

6 wins 3 draws 6 losses

=== The 21st Century ===
The merged team “Bdin-Kremikovtsi” finished 11th in the “B” Group with 38 points from:

10 wins 8 draws 12 losses

and a goal difference of 35:35.

Only inferior head-to-head results kept the Vidin side ahead of “Metalurg” Radomir, “Septemvri” Sofia, and “Svetkavitsa” Targovishte, all of whom finished with the same number of points.

Survival, however, did not come easily.

“Bdin” was banned from playing its final three home matches in Vidin because of an incident during a game against “Vidima-Rakovski” Sevlievo.

The first match was played in Montana, where “Bdin” drew 1–1 with “Maritsa.” The remaining two matches were held in Vratsa.

In the first of those, “Bdin” defeated direct rivals “Metalurg” 1–0.

The second match, against “Dunav” Ruse on June 3, 2000, became a true drama. Two buses filled with supporters traveled to Vratsa to watch the game.

Goals from Rumen Rumenov and Andrey Kirilov gave “Bdin” the lead. In the 71st minute, Krasi Velyov scored an own goal to make it 2–1, but in the end “Bdin” and its supporters celebrated — “Bdin-Kremikovtsi” survived in the division.

During the 2000/01 season, once again under the name “Bdin,” the Vidin club returned independently to the “B” Group six years after its previous relegation.

However, the club’s finances lasted only through the autumn half-season. Two days before the start of the spring campaign, “Bdin” withdrew from the “B” Group.

The following season, engineer Zhoro Vasilev became president of the club and saved “Bdin” from disappearing from the football map of Bulgaria.

The team began competing in the Northwestern “V” Group. Several difficult amateur seasons followed until the 2005/06 campaign.

That season, “Bdin” finished second in the Northwestern “V” Group with 71 points, only three behind leaders “Chavdar” Byala Slatina.

The Vidin side recorded:

22 wins 5 draws only 7 losses

with a goal difference of 78:27.

“Bdin” drew 0–0 with Byala Slatina at home and lost 1–0 away — results that ultimately cost the team first place.

Nevertheless, second place qualified “Bdin” for a playoff against “Vihar” Gorublyane.

On June 14, 2006, after a dramatic match at “Belite Orli” Stadium in Pleven, “Bdin” lost 6–5 on penalties. Regular time ended 2–2.

In that match, “Bdin” was deprived of three key Romanian players:

Matei Laurentiu Epore Adrian Lupanca Cosmin

The Bulgarian Football Union refused to allow the trio to participate because they had temporarily returned earlier in the season to play in Romania.

Despite this setback, “Bdin” took the lead through Borislav Boyanov in the 25th minute.

Ten minutes later, Nikolay Bozhov equalized for “Vihar,” and four minutes after halftime he scored again to complete the comeback.

The Vidin side, however, showed tremendous character and equalized in the 63rd minute through Yavor Vadov to make it 2–2.

During the penalty shootout:

experienced “Bdin” player Plamen Rusinov missed Chavdar Atanasov of “Vihar” also failed to score

The decisive moment came with the final penalty taken by Nikolay Ganchev of “Bdin,” whose shot struck the crossbar, sending “Vihar” into the Western “B” Group.

The next two championships saw “Bdin” finish fifth in the Northwestern “V” Group.

In the first season, the position carried little significance, but in 2007/08 the situation became especially frustrating because the top two teams earned direct promotion to the “B” Group.

The following 2008/09 season was much stronger. “Bdin” finished second with:

72 points 22 wins 6 draws only 2 losses

and a goal difference of 80:22.

“Botev” Vratsa won the group with 79 points.

Importantly, “Bdin” did not lose either direct match against their regional rivals from Vratsa:

1–1 in Vidin 3–3 away

Fate eventually offered “Bdin” another opportunity.

The Bulgarian Football Union expelled “Belasitsa” from the Western “B” Group and, after the championship had already begun, scheduled a playoff between the runners-up of the Northwestern and Southwestern “V” Groups:

“Bdin” Vidin “Malesh” Mikrevo

Thus, August 19, 2009 became a memorable date for Vidin.

At the neutral “Hristo Botev” Stadium in Botevgrad, “Bdin,” coached by Danail Petkov, won 2–1.

Borislav Borisov opened the scoring in the 15th minute, and in the 79th minute Tsvetomir Todorov effectively secured victory with a second goal.

“Malesh” only managed to reduce the deficit in stoppage time through Georgi Zhezhev.

And so, after 10 years away, “Bdin” Vidin returned to the “B” Group, his return was generally well received by:

the more than 500 supporters present in Botevgrad thousands of fans back in Vidin the entire city

The club plays its home matches at “Georgi Benkovski” Stadium.

At present, Bdin competes in the Northwestern Third League.

In its history, Bdin has one appearance in the Bulgarian top division (“A” Group), during the 1948/49 season, when the team finished ninth and second from bottom.

The club most recently played in the second tier of Bulgarian football during the 2011/12 season, finishing third before later withdrawing from participation.
