= Ayak =

Ayak may refer to:

== Places ==
- Sledge Island or Ayak Island, an island in the Bering Sea administered by Alaska, United States
- Ayak (village), a village in Asmat Regency, South Papua, Indonesia; see list of districts of South Papua
- Aiambak Airport (ICAO airport code: AYAK), an airfield in Papua New Guinea

== People with the given name ==
- Ayak Thiik, South Sudanese singer-songwriter
- Ayak Abiel, South Sudanese representative to Miss International 2013

== Other ==
- Kadem or ayak, an Ottoman unit of length
- Ayak, the name for the Turkish makam scale in the context of Turkish folk music
- Ayak, a figure in Dinka religion, a female goddess
- An abbreviation for "Are You a Klansman", used in Ku Klux Klan titles and vocabulary

== See also ==
- Ayaks (disambiguation)
- Yak (disambiguation)
