= Ayaks (disambiguation) =

Ayaks (Russian: АЯКС, romanized: AYaKS, lit. 'AJAX') is a Soviet aircraft development programme.

Ayaks may also refer to:

== Soccer ==
- Ayaks Shakhtarsk, the Ayaks, a soccer team in Shakhtarsk, Donetsk, Ukraine
- Ayaks Krasnyi Luch; the Ayaks, a soccer team in Krasnyi Luch Municipality, Luhansk, Ukraine; who participated in the 1993–94&1994–95 seasons of the Ukrainian Football Amateur League
- Ayaks, a soccer team in Oresh, Bulgaria; see List of football clubs in Bulgaria

== Other uses ==
- Stepan Shaumian (1878–1918, nicknamed "Ayaks"), Armenian Bolshevik revolutionary and politician
- Ayaks Cargo (Ayaks Polet Airlines), a Russian cargo airline that operates the Antonov An-124 Ruslan cargo plane

== See also ==
- Yak (disambiguation)
- Ayak (disambiguation), for the singular of Ayaks
- Ajax (disambiguation) (Russian: Аякс, romanized: Ayaks, lit. 'Ajax')
