= List of football stadiums in Bulgaria =

The following is a list of football stadiums in Bulgaria, ranked in order of capacity, with the minimum capacity being 1,000.

== Current stadiums ==
#	Image	Stadium	Capacity	City	Home team	Opened	UEFA rank
1		Vasil Levski National Stadium	43,630	Sofia	Bulgaria national football team	1953	4/4 stars
2		Hristo Botev Stadium	18,777	Plovdiv	Botev Plovdiv	2023	4/4 stars
3		Balgarska Armia Stadium	18,540	Sofia	CSKA Sofia	2026	4/4 stars
4		Lazur Stadium	18,037	Burgas	Neftochimic Burgas	1967	3/4 stars
5		Georgi Asparuhov Stadium	17,688	Sofia	Levski Sofia	1963	3/4 stars
6		Aleksandar Shalamanov Stadium	15,992	Sofia	Slavia Sofia	1958	
7		Georgi Benkovski	13,128	Pazardzhik	Hebar Pazardzhik	1989	
8	Gradski Stadium	Gradski Stadium	13,000	Ruse	Dunav Ruse	1910	
9		Druzhba Stadium	12,500	Dobrich	Dobrudzha Dobrich	1960	
10		Beroe Stadium	12,128	Stara Zagora	Beroe Stara Zagora	1959	
11		Arena Arda	11,114	Kardzhali	Arda Kardzhali	1963	
12		Lokomotiv Stadium	10,500	Gorna Oryahovitsa	FC Lokomotiv Gorna Oryahovitsa	1956	
13		Ludogorets Arena	10,423	Razgrad	PFC Ludogorets Razgrad	2011	4/4 stars
14		Akademik Stadium	10,000	Sofia	Akademik Sofia		
15		Hadzhi Dimitar Stadium	10,000	Sliven	Sliven 2000 (dissolved)	1959	
16		Tsar Samuil Stadium	9,500	Petrich	Belasitsa Petrich		
17		Hristo Botev Stadium	8,935	Vratsa	Botev Vratsa	1948	
18		Rakovski Stadium	8,800	Sevlievo	Vidima-Rakovski Sevlievo	1958	
19		Lokomotiv Stadium	8,765	Plovdiv	Lokomotiv Plovdiv	1982	
20		Hristo Botev Stadium	8,500	Gabrovo	Yantra Gabrovo	1919	
21		Lovech Stadium	8,000	Lovech	Litex Lovech	1962	3/4 stars
22		Minyor Stadium	8,000	Pernik	Minyor Pernik	1954	
23		Hristo Botev Stadium	8,000	Botevgrad	Balkan Botevgrad		
24		Hristo Botev Stadium	7,500	Blagoevgrad	Pirin Blagoevgrad	1934	
25		Haskovo Stadium	7,500	Haskovo	Haskovo	1961	
26		Spartak Stadium	7,000	Varna	Spartak Varna	1964	
27		Nesebar Stadium	7,000	Nesebar	Nesebar	1965	
28		Iskar Stadium	7,000	Samokov	Rilski Sportist Samokov		
29		Ticha Stadium	6,250	Varna	Cherno More Varna	1968	
30		Lokomotiv Stadium	6,000	Sofia	Lokomotiv Sofia	1985	
31		Ogosta Stadium	6,000	Montana	Montana	1965	
32		Septemvri Stadium	6,000	Smolyan	Rodopa Smolyan		
33		Sandanski Stadium	6,000	Sandanski	Vihren Sandanski		
34		Ivaylo Stadium	5,000	Tarnovo	Etar Veliko Tarnovo	1958	
35		Bonchuk Stadium	5,000	Dupnitsa	Marek Dupnitsa	1952	
36		Lokomotiv Stadium	5,000	Mezdra	Lokomotiv Mezdra	1946	
37		Kavarna Stadium	5,000	Kavarna	PFC Kaliakra Kavarna	1967	
38		Arena Sozopol	3,500	Sozopol	FC Sozopol	2012	
39		Panayot Volov Stadium	3,500	Shumen	Volov Shumen		
40		Trace Arena	3,500	Stara Zagora	FC Vereya	2001	
41		Pleven Stadium	3,040	Pleven	Spartak Pleven	1952	
42		Rakovski Stadium	3,000	Rakovski	FC Rakovski	1954	
43	Balchik Stadium	Balchik Stadium	2,618	Balchik	FC Chernomorets Balchik		
44		Stadion Pomorie	2,000	Pomorie	OFC Pomorie	2006	
45		Dimitar Burkov Stadium	1,600	Targovishte	Svetkavitsa	1954	

== Future stadiums ==
Stadium	Capacity	City	Home team	Broke ground	Status	Opening	UEFA rank
Georgi Asparuhov Stadium redevelopment project	25,000	Sofia	Levski Sofia	2013	Frozen. One stand completed	-	4/4 stars
New Varna Stadium	22,441	Varna	Cherno More Varna	2008	Three stands ready for rough construction. Ongoing building of the new stadium.	2027	4/4 stars
Bulgarian Army Stadium redevelopment project	18,540	Sofia	CSKA Sofia	2024	Ongoing building of the new stadium.	2026	4/4 stars
Lokomotiv Stadium	14,500	Plovdiv	Lokomotiv Plovdiv	2011	Expansion is underway, three stands fully completed, ongoing reconstruction of the main stand.	2026	4/4 stars
Ludogorets Arena expansion	12,500	Razgrad	Ludogorets Razgrad	2011	Three stands completed. Construction of main stand is frozen.	-	4/4 stars

== Former stadiums ==
Image	Stadium	Capacity	City	Home team	Opened	Closed	Demolished
	Yuri Gagarin Stadium	40,000	Varna	Cherno More Varna	1950	2007	2008
	Chernomorets Stadium	22,000	Burgas	Chernomorets Burgas	1954	2006	-
	Stadion Septemvri	25,000	Sofia	Septemvri Sofia	1958	2011	-
	Lokomotiv Stadium	10,000	Stara Zagora	Lokomotiv Stara Zagora (dissolved)			

== See also ==
- Football in Bulgaria
- List of football clubs in Bulgaria
- Lists of stadiums
