= Football in Bulgaria =

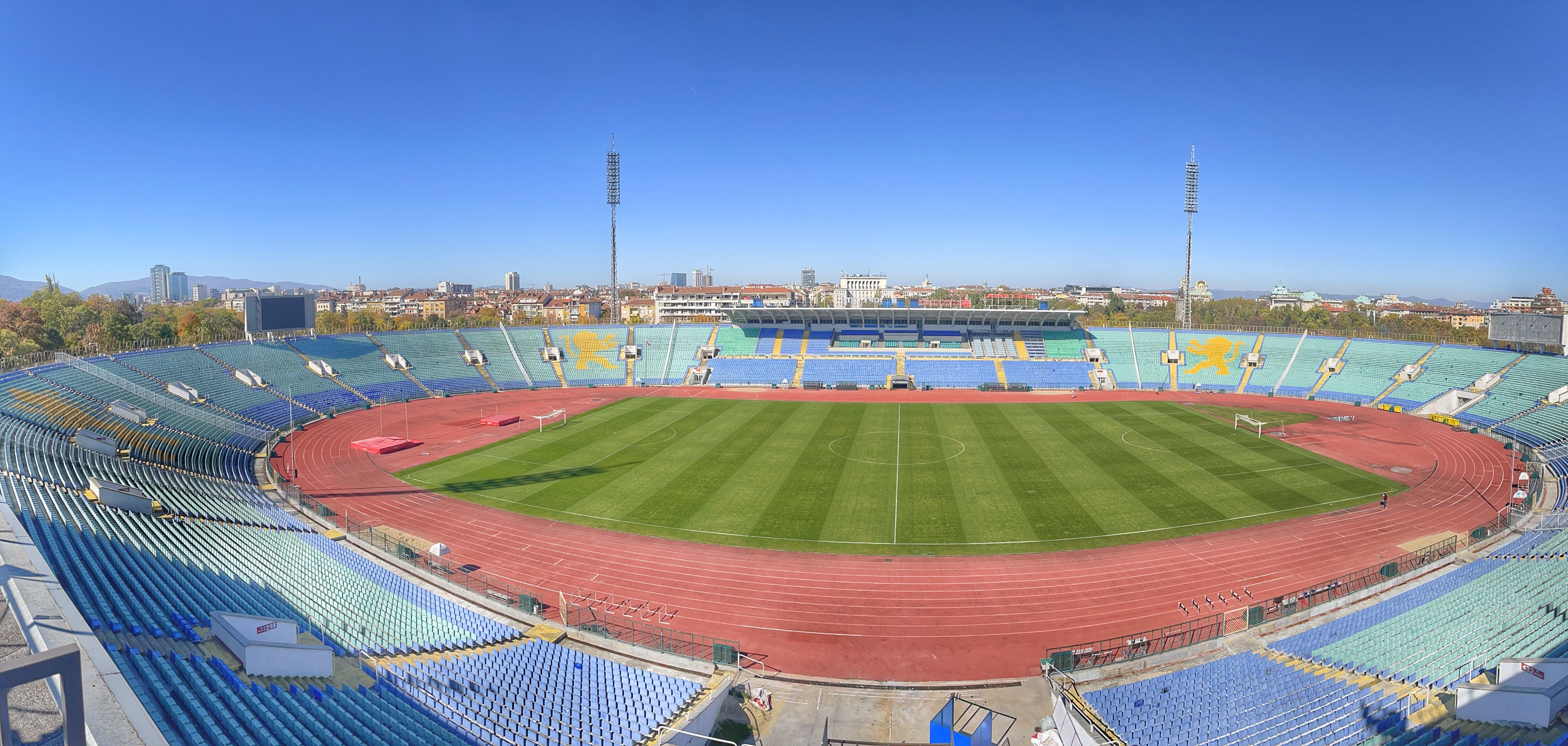
- Vasil Levski National Stadium
- Country: Bulgaria
- Governing body: Bulgarian Football Union
- National team: Bulgaria national football team
- First played: 1894; 132 years ago

National competitions
- FIFA World Cup; UEFA European Championship; UEFA Nations League

Club competitions
- League; First League; Second League; Cups; Bulgarian Cup; Bulgarian Super Cup

International competitions
- UEFA Champions League; UEFA Europa League; UEFA Europa Conference League; UEFA Super Cup; FIFA Club World Cup

Football (Bulgarian: футбол, futbol) is the most popular sport in Bulgaria. Around 40% of the people in Bulgaria are football fans. The sport was introduced in 1893–1894 by Swiss gymnastics teachers invited to the country. A football (initially called ритнитоп, ritnitop, "kickball") match was first played in Varna's High School for Boys in 1894, where it was introduced by Georges de Regibus, and the game was brought to Sofia by Charles Champaud the following year. The rules of the game were published in Bulgarian by Swiss teachers in the Uchilishten pregled magazine in 1897, and football continued to gain popularity in the early 20th century. Among the founders of the Turkish team Galatasaray in 1905 was the Bulgarian Lycée de Galatasaray student Blagoy Balakchiev, and the first Bulgarian club, Futbol Klub, was established in Sofia in 1909 on the initiative of Sava Kirov. Botev Plovdiv was founded in 1912, Slavia Sofia in 1913, and Levski Sofia in 1914.

The Bulgaria national football team debuted on 21 May 1924 in a 1924 Summer Olympics qualifier, losing 0–6 to Austria in Vienna. In the 1950s and 1960s Bulgarian football achieved its biggest Olympic success, being third in the 1956 Summer Olympics in Melbourne and second in the 1968 Summer Olympics in Mexico City, also finishing fifth in Euro 1968. In 1962, Bulgaria first qualified for a FIFA World Cup tournament, in total of seven participations to date. In the 1986 FIFA World Cup, Bulgaria did reach the round of 16. Then, in the 1994 FIFA World Cup, came Bulgaria's biggest World Cup success, the fourth place, the elimination of reigning world champions Germany and Hristo Stoichkov's top goalscorer prize. Bulgaria is also three times European champion in under-19, three times Balkan champion, and three times Balkan Youth champion. The titles won by the national team make Bulgaria one of the best performing nations in European football competitions.

== Bulgarian football competitions ==
- Championships:
  - Top division: First League - 14 teams
  - Second division: Second League - 16 teams
  - Third division: Third League - 4 groups with 12-18 teams each
  - Fourth division: Regional Groups - divided by region
- Cup: Bulgarian Cup
- Super Cup: Bulgarian Super Cup
- AFL Cup: Cup of Bulgarian Amateur Football League

== Crime and corruption ==
Between 2003 and 2013, 15 club presidents or previous owners of Bulgarian top league clubs were murdered. A leaked US diplomatic cable of 2010 claimed that since the end of Communism, allegations of illegal gambling, match fixing, money laundering, and tax evasion abound in Bulgarian football, which has become a symbol of organised crime's corrupt influence on important institutions.

== Most successful clubs overall ==
As of 9 September 2026

local and lower league organizations are not included.

Club	Domestic Titles					European Titles			Overall titles
Club	Parva Liga	Bulgarian Cup	Secondary cup (1981–1982) & (1983–1990) & (1991)	Bulgarian Supercup	Total	European Railways Cup	Balkans Cup	Total	Overall titles
CSKA Sofia (Note: In November 1944, AS-23 and Shipka Sofia and Spartak Poduene merged to form Chavdar Sofia, which ultimately laid the foundations to what is known today as CSKA Sofia. Together all predecessor clubs and CSKA Sofia have won 66 titles.)	**31**	22	**5**	5	**63**	-	-	-	**63**
Levski Sofia	27	**26**	4	3	60	-	-	-	60
Ludogorets	14	4	-	**9**	27	-	-	-	27
Slavia Sofia	7	8	-	-	15	-	2	2	17
Lokomotiv Sofia	4	4	-	-	8	**2**	1	3	11
Lovech	4	4	-	1	9	-	-	-	9
Beroe Stara Zagora	1	2	-	1	4	-	**4**	**4**	8
Botev Plovdiv	2	4	-	1	7	-	1	1	8
Lokomotiv Plovdiv	1	2	1	2	6	-	-	-	6
Vladislav Varna (Note: On 18 February 1945, SC Ticha and SC Vladislav merged to form Ticha-Vladislav nowadays Cherno More Varna. Together all predecessor clubs and Cherno More Varna have won 6 titles.)	3	-	-	-	3	-	-	-	3
AS-23	1	1	-	-	2	-	-	-	2
Spartak Plovdiv	1	1	-	-	2	-	-	-	2
Etar	1	-	1	-	2	-	-	-	2
13 Sofia	-	2	-	-	2	-	-	-	2
Cherno More Varna	-	1	-	1	2	-	-	-	2
Lokomotiv Mezdra	-	-	-	-	-	1	-	1	1
Akademik Sofia	-	-	-	-	-	-	1	1	1
Spartak Varna	1	-	-	-	1	-	-	-	1
Sportklub Sofia (Note: On 5 November 1944, Sportklub Sofia was merged with Sokol Sofia and Vazrazhdane Sofia and a new club was founded on Sportklub Sofia's basis – Septemvri Sofia, who is also its official descendant. Together all predecessor clubs and Septemvri Sofia have won 2 titles.)	1	-	-	-	1	-	-	-	1
Ticha Varna	1	-	-	-	1	-	-	-	1
Marek Dupnitsa	-	1	-	-	1	-	-	-	1
Septemvri Sofia	-	1	-	-	1	-	-	-	1
Shipka Sofia	-	1	-	-	1	-	-	-	1
Sliven	-	1	-	-	1	-	-	-	1
Spartak Sofia	-	1	-	-	1	-	-	-	1

- The articles in italic indicate the defunct leagues and the defunct cups.
- The figures in **bold** indicate the most times this competition has been won by a team.

== Attendances ==
The average attendance per top-flight football league season and the club with the highest average attendance:

Season	League average	Best club	Best club average
2018–19	1,881	Levski	5,817
2017–18	1,753	CSKA Sofia	5,019
2016–17	1,638	CSKA Sofia	4,217
2015–16	2,108	Levski	3,558
2014–15	2,034	Beroe	4,069
2013–14	1,798	CSKA Sofia	4,364
2012–13	2,606	Botev	8,071
2011–12	2,117	CSKA Sofia	4,227
2010–11	1,883	Chernomorets	4,084
2009–10	1,834	Chernomorets	3,996
2008–09	2,862	Levski	5,967
2007–08	2,891	CSKA Sofia	5,313
2006–07	2,790	Levski	7,572
2005–06	3,157	Levski	6,228
2004–05	2,763	CSKA Sofia	4,813
2003–04	2,854	Lokomotiv Plovdiv	6,333
2002–03	3,344	CSKA Sofia	7,462
2001–02	4,007	Neftochimik	8,750
2000–01	5,392	Levski	13,216
1999–2000	6,859	Beroe	13,600
1998–99	—	—	—
1997–98	—	—	—
1996–97	—	—	—
1995–96	6,799	Neftochimik	17,500
1994–95	7,479	Levski	17,133
1993–94	4,646	Levski	9,367
1992–93	6,554	Botev	12,467
1991–92	5,186	Levski	8,773
1990–91	7,486	Hebar	12,533
1989–90	8,183	Dunav	13,400
1988–89	9,570	Levski	14,500
1987–88	8,700	Levski	12,750
1986–87	9,225	Beroe	17,667
1985–86	9,044	Botev	13,100
1984–85	10,031	Volov	21,600
1983–84	9,367	Botev	13,733

== See also ==
- List of football clubs in Bulgaria
- List of football stadiums in Bulgaria
- Bulgaria national football team
- Bulgaria national under-21 football team
- Bulgaria national under-19 football team
- Bulgarian Football Union
- Bulgarian Footballer of the Year
- Bulgarian Professional Football Leaguе
  - Официален сайт на Първа професионална футболна лига
