= Beurk =

Beurk is an interjection similar to yuck.
