= Yake =

Yake can be both a surname and a given name. Notable people with the name include:

== Surname ==
- Elizabeth Yake, Canadian film producer
- Terry Yake (born 1968), Canadian ice hockey player

== Chinese given name ==
- Wu Yake (吴亚轲; born 1991), Chinese footballer

== Place ==
- Yake, Somalia

== See also ==
- Mount Yake, active volcano in Japan
- Yak (disambiguation)
