= Yaksa =

Yaksa or Yaksha may refer to:

- Yaksa (band), Chinese rock band
- Yaksha (Sanskrit Yakṣa), a nature-spirit in Hinduism, Jainism, and Buddhism
- Yaksha kingdom, an ancient kingdom in Indian epic literature
- Yakkha (disambiguation), also called "Yaksa-sh"
- Albazin, a village in Russia that was once named Yagsi (Yaksa in Manchu)
  - Jaxa (state)

== See also ==
- Yakuza
- Yakshini, also called Yaksis
- Yak (disambiguation)
- Yaxa, an automobile make
