= Yuk =

Yuk may refer to:

- Yuk (surname), a Korean surname derived from Lu (surname 陆)
  - Yuk Young-soo, former first lady of South Korea
- Yuk, a sophomore at the United States Military Academy

== See also ==
- Mr. Yuk, a trademarked cartoon graphic image, widely employed in the United States in labeling of substances that are poisonous if ingested
- Yuk Yuk's, a national comedy club chain in Canada, owned and established by former stand-up comedian Mark Breslin
- Yuck (disambiguation)
