= Stadion Hristo Botev (Plovdiv) =

Football stadium in Plovdiv, Bulgaria

Hristo Botev Stadium
- Колежа / Kolezha (The College)
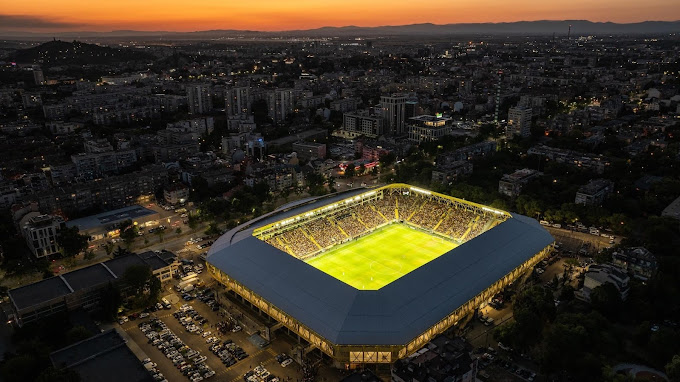
- UEFA
- Interactive map of Hristo Botev Stadium
- Location: Plovdiv, Bulgaria
- Coordinates: 42°08′24″N 24°45′52″E
- Owner: Plovdiv Municipality
- Operator: Botev Plovdiv
- Capacity: 18,777
- Surface: Grass
- Record attendance: 40,000 (Botev Plovdiv–Atlético Madrid, 27 February 1963)
- Field size: 105m x 68m

Construction
- Groundbreaking: 1923
- Built: 1959–1961
- Opened: 14 May 1961
- Renovated: 1993, 1995, 2008, 2012, 2013–2023
- Architect: Anton Karavelov / Georgi Savov

Tenants
- Botev Plovdiv (1961–present); Bulgaria national football team (2024–present)

Stadion Hristo Botev (Bulgarian: Стадион „Христо Ботев“, English: 'Hristo Botev Stadium') is a football stadium in the Kamenitsa neighbourhood of Plovdiv, Bulgaria. It is the home of Botev Plovdiv. Originally named The College, it is still popular by this name amongst fans, as in the early 20th century the pitch was owned by Saint Augustine Catholic College.

The stadium hosted the 2000 Bulgarian Cup Final.

Since the middle of 2014 the stadium's reconstruction was on hold, due to the lack of financing. It's estimated that nearly €15,000,000 were needed in order for it to be completed. Finances were found and the reconstruction of the stadium resumed. The first phase of the reconstruction, which involved making the stadium suitable for hosting football matches, was completed in March 2023. And on 29th of April 2023 Botev played against PFC Levski Sofia which was the first game on the newly renovated stadium.

== History ==
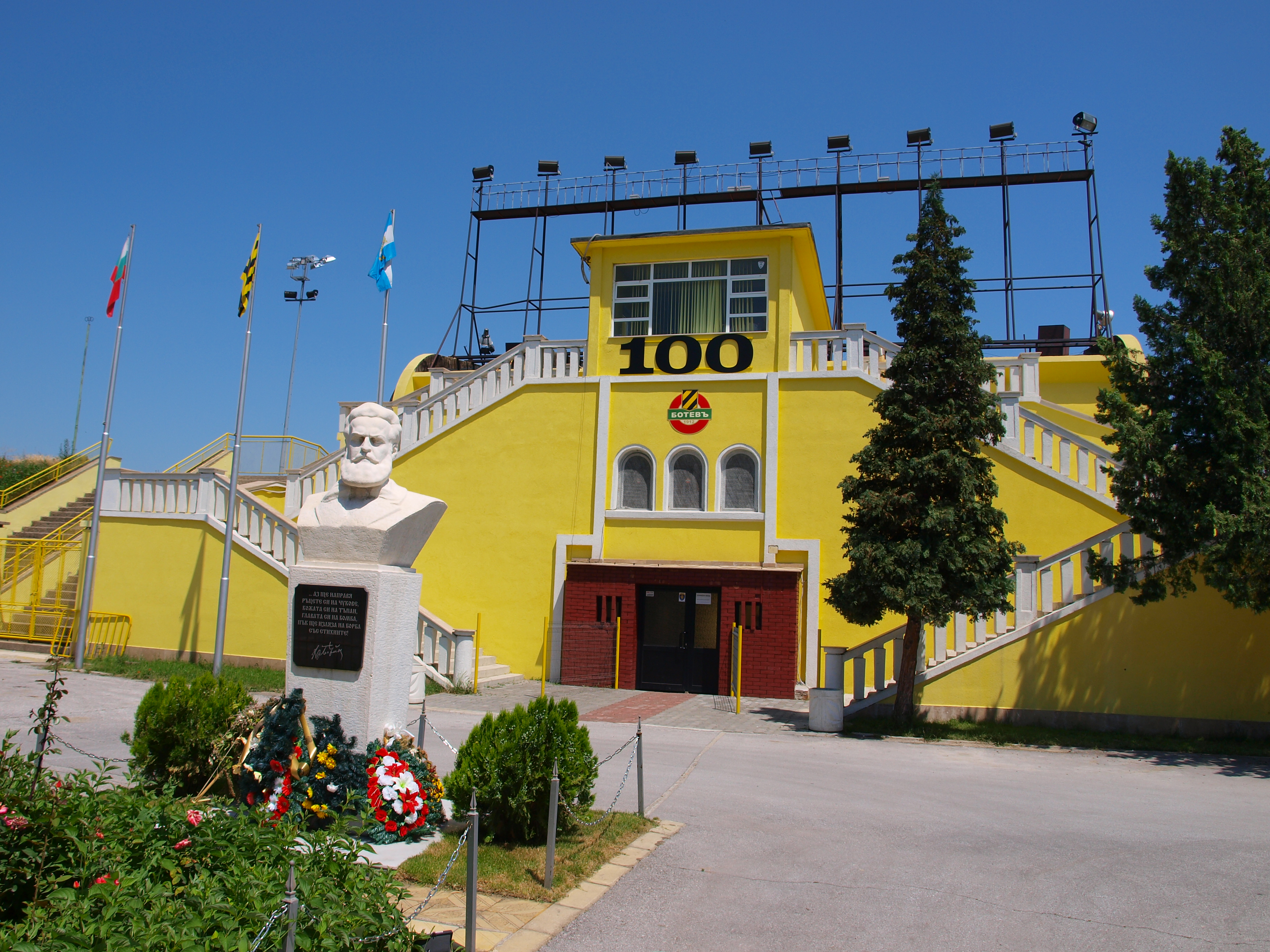
The central stand of the stadium, before being demolished

The story of stadium goes back in the early 1920s when priest Ausone (Henri) Damperat on behalf of the Saint Augustine College purchased a large plot of land in the quarter of Kamenitza, then east outskirts of Plovdiv. Due to following urban regulations, the terrain was almost expunged and a neighbouring cadastre plot had substituted it whilst half a million Leva being spent to acquire. In 1923 the pitch was inaugurated and by mid-1940s had been best sports venue in town. In 1959, the authorities allowed the construction of a new club stadium at the place of the old field in the neighborhood of Kamenitza. As a result, building works began, and nearly two years later, Botev Plovdiv returned to their home ground. The reconstructed stadium had a capacity of 35,000 people and electric lightning. On 14 May 1961 it was inaugurated with a friendly match between Botev Plovdiv and Steaua București, which won by the club from Bulgaria with 3–0. In the years from 1926 to 1947, Botev Plovdiv played six international matches on the ground, they were against Admira Vienna (1–7), Kecskemét (3–2 and 2–4), Beşiktaş (0–0), Bohemians Prague (1–3) and the famous "wonderteam" of Austria Vienna (sensational win with 5–4). The attendance record of 40,000 people was set on 27 February 1963 during the quarter-final of the Cup Winner's Cup against Atlético Madrid (1–1). The record of 37,000 people for the Bulgarian championship was set in 1966 against Levski Sofia (0–1). Due to the riots between the fans, and the rush of fans on the field, Botev Plovdiv was forced to host its derby matches at the Plovdiv Stadium.

== Renovations ==
=== 1993 ===
The renovations from this period include moving the away team's changing room to the eastern part of the stadium. In order to connect the changing room with the field a tunnel was built under the east and north stand, this slightly affected the overall capacity of the stadium.

=== 1995 ===
In 1995 electric lighting was installed, but it failed to reach the standards of the Bulgarian Football Union.

=== 2008 ===
The stadium underwent minor renovations in the summer. The away team's changing room was moved under the central stand once again, the room was then modernised, other actions included improving the overall safety and security.

=== 2012 ===
The renovations included replacing the field's old grass surface with a new one, under which were set up new drainage, watering and heating systems. New football goals were placed, and 400 seats were mounted on the central stand.

== Reconstruction ==
Following the renovations in 2012, which were the first phase in the reconstruction of the new stadium, in mid 2013 the second phase was activated and the east stand was demolished. The initial plan was to demolish the old stands and rebuild them one at a time and closer to the football field, but in order for the stadium to host the 2015 UEFA European Under-17 Championship, a new less time-consuming plan was designed and in December the same year, all of the remaining stands were decimated. The change in plans forced Botev Plovdiv to play its home games on the club's training base, the Botev 1912 Football Complex, which is located in the neighbourhood of Komatevo.

On 5 March 2014 a new and improved version of the stadium was presented by the directors of the club and the designing architect. The club decided to change the vision, due to the higher targets they wanted to meet. The new stadium had to be ready for operation by mid 2015, in order to host the 2015 European Under-17 Championship. The plans included an overall capacity of 18,777 spectators, of which 1500 places were for the visiting fans. Other concepts included covering 75% of the seats, as well as building a parking with a capacity of 600 places for cars and 7 for buses. The stadium was supposed to be able to host semifinals from the European club tournaments, such as Europa League and Champions League.

In the summer of 2014, the reconstruction of the new stadium temporarily stopped, because Botev Plovdiv's main sponsor ‒ Corporate Commercial Bank experienced issues. On 6 November 2014 the license of the bank was revoked. The reason for the revocation, according to the Bulgarian National Bank, was a significant exposure of the bank's credit sheet to investors related to Tsvetan Vasilev (who at that time was the owner of Botev Plovdiv and the chairman of Corporate Commercial Bank). The lack of financing forced the club to stop the reconstruction, and search for new investors.

Тhe fully renovated UEFA category four stadium hosted its opening match on the 29th of April 2023 against Levski Sofia.

== See also ==
- List of football stadiums in Bulgaria
- Lists of stadiums
