= Aiambak Airport =

Airport in Papua New Guinea

- IATA: AIH; ICAO: AYAK

Summary
- Location: Aiambak, Papua New Guinea
- Elevation AMSL: 90 ft / 27 m
- Coordinates: 7°20.55′S 141°15.99′E

Map
- Location of airport in Papua New Guinea

Runways
Direction	Length		Surface
Direction	m	ft	Surface
13/31	770	2,526
- Source: PNG Airstrip Guide

Aiambak Airport (IATA: AIH, ICAO: AYAK) is an airfield serving Aiambak, in the Western Province of Papua New Guinea.
