= Yuck =

Yuck is an exclamation of disgust.

Yuck may also refer to:

== Music ==
- Yuck (band), a British rock band
  - Yuck (Yuck album), 2011 album
- Yuck (Alpine album), by Alpine, 2015
- "Yuck" (song), by Joyryde, 2019
- "Yuck", by 2 Chainz feat. Lil Wayne from Based on a T.R.U. Story (2012)
- "Yuck", by Logic from Bobby Tarantino II (2018)
- "Yuck", by Charli XCX from Crash (2022)
- "Yuck", a 2025 song by Young Thug

== Others ==
- Yuck factor, the wisdom of repugnance
- Yuck (Yin Yang Yo!), a character in animated television series Yin Yang Yo!
- "Yuck!", 2009 track from Matt Tilley's prank phone call album The Final Call
- Yuck!, 1984 book by James Stevenson
- Yuck! The Nature and Moral Significance of Disgust, 2011 book by Daniel R. Kelly
- Yuck! (film), 2024 French animated short film

== See also ==
- Yuk (disambiguation)
- Yak (disambiguation)
