= Yak (disambiguation) =

A yak is a long-haired species of cattle. There are two types of yak:

- Domestic yak (Bos grunniens)
- Wild yak (Bos mutus)

Yak may also refer to:

- Yak (band), an English rock band
- YAK (cryptography) is a public-key authenticated key agreement protocol
- Yak (Thailand), a mythical ogre of the Yasha kind
- Yak (instrument), a type of flute
- "Yak", English game designer Jeff Minter
- "The Yak", Nigerian footballer Yakubu
- Yakovlev or Yak Aircraft Corporation, or numerous aircraft designed or manufactured by this company
- Rheinmetall MAN Military Vehicles YAK, an armoured transport vehicle
- Yak-B 12.7mm machine gun, a Russian .50 caliber four-barrel gatling gun
- Yak Peak, a mountain in British Columbia, Canada
- A member of a yakuza organization
- IATA airport code for Yakutat Airport in Yakutat, Alaska

== Korean ==
약 (Revised Romanization: yak) may refer to:

- Radical 214 of Chinese characters
- Yak, also called tongso yak, one of the types of traditional Korean musical instruments
- The character 약 itself, in the Unicode block Hangul Syllables

== See also ==
- Yacc, a computer program that generates parsers
- Yake (disambiguation)
- Yaksa (disambiguation)
- Yuck (disambiguation), various meanings, primarily as a sound of disgust
