= List of football clubs in Bulgaria =

This list of football teams in Bulgaria, contains football clubs that have recently been and/or still are members of the Bulgarian Football Union.

== Overview ==
The list consists of sports clubs that in recent years have been members of the Bulgarian Football Union (BFU). For a club to be a member of the BFU it has to endeavour in practising and/or developing football on the territory of Bulgaria. Thus, for a club to be a member of the BFU it is sufficient for it to have an active football youth academy, without sustaining any football team to participate in the tournaments organised by the BFU. Nevertheless, most members of the union do form a football team and almost all of them have a representative team for the men's football tournaments organised by the BFU.

=== Names ===
Some clubs in the list have undergone slight name changes for administrative or technical purposes but still have the same representative team. (For example Lokomotiv 1926 (Plovdiv) in the list throughout the years has been officially named NFC Lokomotiv (Plovdiv), FC Lokomotiv Plovdiv 1936, PFC Lokomotiv 1926 Plovdiv, etc.) Thus, the official name of a football club may differ slightly from the one in the list.

=== Membership and Participation ===
For a football club to be a member of the Bulgarian Football Union it is sufficient to engage in activities developing the sport, but not actively participating in the tournaments organised by the governing body. Thus a club may not have a participating team in the men's football leagues considered in the list but still be a member of the union. A club may have its membership revoked by the executive committee of the BFU if it has not practised and/or developed football in Bulgaria for more than two years.

In the list, teams marked as Does Not Participate in the Level tab, may only have a youth academy, or women's or children's teams, or have stopped engaging in football altogether since the last Assembly of the executive committee of the BFU. Also, there were 182 clubs with revoked memberships and 103 clubs accepted as members of the union on the Assembly that was held on 14 February 2014, but information on the teams is not readily available to the public from the Bulgarian Football Union or the Bulgarian Professional Football League. Still, some of the teams may have ended the life-cycle of their legal personality (the registered football club), yet reapplied for membership in the BFU under a different legal body (a newly formed club successor of the previous), causing re-licensing and slight change of name but continuation of the team.

=== Levels ===
The football clubs in the list are divided into five hierarchical categories which represent the five levels of the Bulgarian football pyramid with Level 1 being the top league and Level 5 being the bottom league in the system. The hierarchical format of the pyramid has promotion and relegation between leagues at different levels at the end of each cycle (season), allowing self-sustaining system of better playing teams joining the higher levels.

Throughout the years, the various levels have had different names, number of participants and structure. Generally, the top level has always been a single league, while the lower levels have consisted of a various number of divisions specified geographically and running simultaneously. The Third Amateur Football League (Bulgaria) continues to have four divisions (South-West, South-East, North-East, and North-West) that run in parallel.

Despite changes in the official names of the leagues the levels are commonly referred to as follows:

Level 1: Parva Liga

Level 2: Vtora Liga

Level 3: Treta Liga

Level 4: A Oblast Group

Level 5: B Oblast Group

As of season 2025-26 the official names and structure of the five levels of Bulgarian football are:

Level 1- the First professional football league

has one division of 16 clubs in it.

Level 2 - the Second Professional Football league

has one division of 17 clubs in it.

Level 3 - the Third Amateur Football League

has four divisions - North-East with 17 clubs, North-West with 12 clubs, South-West with 18 clubs, South-East with 19 clubs

Level 4 - A Oblast Football Groups
There are forty-five (45) divisions from the different districts in Bulgaria that run in parallel, forming 45 A OFGs. The number of teams varies by division.

Level 5 - B Oblast Football Groups
There are seventeen (17) divisions from the different districts in Bulgaria running simultaneously throughout the season. A various number of teams comprises each of the 17 B OFGs

While there is an abundance of Level 4 regional groups, there is a considerably smaller number of Level 5 divisions. This is a result of the uneven number of teams in the various oblasts of the country. For example, While the Burgas Oblast can sustain four Level 5 OFGs that are funneled into one Level 4 OFG, clubs from Smolyan and Lovech are enough to form only one division at one level so these oblasts have no Level 5 OFGs. Still, some of the "provinces" such as Blagoevgrad have five Level 4 divisions, but no Level 5 oblast groups.

=== Regions ===
The list includes a categorisation of teams by region of the country. The most reliable geographical categorisation of football clubs in Bulgaria has been the division of the clubs into four regions - those of the Treta Liga: North-West, North-East, South-East, and South-West, since it has been the sole constant division since the creation of the football pyramid in 1953.

The regions' borders are the administrative borders of the state's "provinces" (oblasts) that constitute the regions.

For the North-West region the included oblasts are: Vidin Province, Montana Province, Vratsa Province, Lovech Province, Pleven Province, Gabrovo Province, and Veliko Tarnovo Province.

Veliko Tarnovo is the administrative center of the North-West zone for the Treta Liga.

For the North-East region the included oblasts are: Razgrad Province, Ruse Province, Targovishte Province, Silistra Province, Shumen Province, Dobrich Province, and Varna Province.

Varna is the administrative center of the North-East zone for the Treta Liga.

For the South-East region the included oblasts are: Burgas Province, Yambol Province, Sliven Province, Stara Zagora Province, Haskovo Province, Kardzhali Province, Smolyan Province, and Plovdiv Province.

Plovdiv is the administrative center of the South-East zone for the Treta Liga.

For the South-West region the included oblasts are: Pazardzhik Province, Blagoevgrad Province, Kyustendil Province, Pernik Province, Sofia Province and Sofia - city.

Sofia is the administrative center of the South-West zone for the Treta Liga.

== All Teams ==
Team	Location	Level	Region	Group
Leemark	Bachevo	4 Level - A OFG	South-West	A OFG Blagoevgrad little league
Avren	Avren	4 Level - A OFG	North-East	A OFG Varna - South
Agroelit	Makariopolsko	4 Level - A OFG	North-East	A OFG Targovishte
Adasport	Ostrovo	4 Level - A OFG	North-East	A OFG Razgrad - East
Aydemir	Aydemir	4 Level - A OFG	North-East	A OFG Silistra - West
Agromel	Momchilovo	4 Level - A OFG	North-West	A OFG Varna - North
Akademik (Varna)	Varna	Does Not Participate		
Akademik (Veselets)	Veselets	4 Level - A OFG	North-East	A OFG Razgrad - East
Akademik (Svishtov)	Svishtov	2 Level - B Group	North-West	B PFG
Akademik (Sofia)	Sofia	Does Not Participate		
Aksakovo	Aksakovo	Does Not Participate		
Akfix	Sofia	5 Level - B OFG	South-West	B OFG Sofia - city
Albena 97	Obrochishte	4 Level - A OFG	North-East	A OFG Dobrich - East
Aleko 2006	Aleko Konstantinovo	Does Not Participate		
Aleks OK	Shemshevo	5 Level - B OFG	North-West	B OFG Veliko Tarnovo
Almus Beer	Staliyska mahala	Does Not Participate		
Altay	Karageorgievo	5 Level - B OFG	North-East	B OFG Burgas - West
Altay sport	Asenovgrad	Does Not Participate		
Angel Kanchev	Tryavna	4 Level - A OFG	North-West	A OFG Gabrovo
Anhialo	Pomorie	4 Level - A OFG	South-East	A OFG Burgas
Apolon	Sliven	4 Level - A OFG	South-East	A OFG Sliven
Apriltsi 2001	Apriltsi	4 Level - A OFG	North-West	A OFG Lovech
Arda (Kardzhali)	Kardzhali	Does Not Participate		
Ariva	Plovdiv	Does Not Participate		
Ariston	Ruse	Does Not Participate		
Arsenal (Kazanlak)	Kazanlak	Does Not Participate		
Arsenal (Lavino)	Lavino	4 Level - A OFG	North-East	A OFG Razgrad - North
Asenovets 2005	Asenovgrad	3 Level - V Group	South-East	South-East V AFG
Atletik (Blagoevgrad)	Blagoevgrad	4 Level - A OFG	South-West	A OFG Blagoevgrad - Bistritsa
Atletik (Makak)	Shumen	4 Level - A OFG	North-East	A OFG Shumen - South
Atletik (Kuklen)	Kuklen	4 Level - A OFG	South-East	A OFG Plovdiv
Atletik (Mokrishte)	Mokrishte	5 Level - B OFG	South-West	B OFG Pazardzhik - South
Atletik (Svishtov)	Svishtov	4 Level - A OFG	North-West	A OFG Veliko Tarnovo - North
Atletik (Trastenik)	Trastenik	4 Level - A OFG	North-West	A OFG Ruse - West
Atletik 09 (Usoyka)	Usoyka	Does Not Participate		
Augusta	Harlets	4 Level - A OFG	North-East	A OFG Vratsa - North
Aheloy	Aheloy	4 Level - A OFG	South-East	A OFG Burgas
Ayaks	Oresh	Does Not Participate		
Baykal	Shiroko pole	4 Level - A OFG	South-East	A OFG Kardzhali
Bakadzhik (Voynika)	Voynika	5 Level - B OFG	South-East	B OFG Yambol
Bakadzhik (Chargan)	Chargan	5 Level - B OFG	South-East	B OFG Yambol
Balik	Balchik	Does Not Participate		
Balkan (Asparuhovo)	Asparuhovo	Does Not Participate		
Balkan (Banishte)	Banishte	4 Level - A OFG	South-West	A OFG Pernik - West
Balkan (Belogradchik)	Belogradchik	Does Not Participate		
Balkan (Botevgrad)	Botevgrad	Does Not Participate		
Balkan (Varvara)	Varvara	3 Level - V Group	South-West	South-West V AFG
Balkan (Goritsa)	Goritsa	5 Level - B OFG	South-East	B OFG Burgas - Center
Balkan (Gorna Breznitsa)	Gorna Breznitsa	Does Not Participate		
Balkan (Oreshak)	Oreshak	Does Not Participate		
Balkan (Planinitsa)	Planinitsa	5 Level - B OFG	South-East	B OFG Burgas - Center
Balkan (Prilep)	Prilep	5 Level - B OFG	South-East	B OFG Burgas - West
Balkan (Razboyna)	Razboyna	Does Not Participate		
Balkan (Selimnovo)	Selimnovo	Does Not Participate		
Balkan (Tvarditsa)	Tvarditsa	4 Level - A OFG	South-East	A OFG Sliven
Balkan (Tserovo)	Tserovo	4 Level - A OFG	South-West	A OFG Blagoevgrad - Bistritsa
Balkan 04 (Inovo)	Inovo	Does Not Participate		
Balkan 2009 (Dobra polyana)	Dobra polyana	5 Level - B OFG	South-East	B OFG Burgas - Center
Balkanski	Mihaylovo	4 Level - A OFG	North-West	A OFG Vratsa - North
Bankya	Bankya	4 Level - A OFG	South-West	A OFG Sofia - city
Banya	Banya	Does Not Participate		
Bansko	Bansko	2 Level - B Group	South-West	B PFG
Barikadi	Strelcha	4 Level - A OFG	South-West	A OFG Pazardzhik
Barsa (Sushevo)	Sushevo	4 Level - A OFG	North-East	A OFG Razgrad - East
Barselona (Borovo)	Borovo	4 Level - A OFG	South-West	A OFG Blagoevgrad - Mesta East
Barselona (Prosenik)	Prosenik	5 Level - B OFG	South-East	B OFG Burgas - Center
Batak	Batak	5 Level - B OFG	South-West	B OFG Pazardzhik - South
Batishnitsa	Batishnitsa	Does Not Participate		
Bdin 1923	Vidin	3 Level - V Group	North-West	North-West V AFG
Bezmer	Bezmer	4 Level - A OFG	South-East	A OFG Yambol
Belasitsa (Petrich)	Petrich	3 Level - V Group	South-West	South-West V AFG
Belasitsa 08 (Belasitsa)	Belasitsa	4 Level - A OFG	South-West	A OFG Blagoevgrad - Struma 2
Belite galabi	Galabets	5 Level - B OFG	South-East	B OFG Burgas - Center
Belite orli	Pleven	Does Not Participate		
Belitsa	Belitsa	3 Level - V Group	North-East	North-East V AFG
Beloslav	Beloslav	4 Level - A OFG	North-East	A OFG Varna - South
Benkovski (Balgarsko Slivovo)	Balgarsko Slivovo	4 Level - A OFG	North-East	A OFG Veliko Tarnovo - North
Benkovski (Byala - Ruse)	Byala	3 Level - V Group	North-East	North-East V AFG
Benkovski (Gabrovnitsa)	Gabrovnitsa	Does Not Participate		
Benkovski (Zimnitsa)	Zimnitsa	4 Level - A OFG	South-East	A OFG Yambol
Benkovski (Kopanitsa)	Kopanitsa	4 Level - A OFG	South-West	A OFG Pernik - South
Benkovski (Kostenets)	Kostenets	4 Level - A OFG	South-West	A OFG Sofia - East
Benkovski (Kurtovo Konare)	Kurtovo Konare	Does Not Participate		
Benkovski (Leskovets)	Leskovets	Does Not Participate		
Benkovski (Nikolaevo)	Nikolaevo	4 Level - A OFG	South-East	A OFG Stara Zagora
Benkovski (Opanets)	Opanets	5 Level - B OFG	North-East	B OFG Pleven - Center
Benkovski (Pazardzhik)	Pazardzhik	Does Not Participate		
Benkovski (Pishtigovo)	Pishtigovo	Does Not Participate		
Benkovski (Podgoritsa)	Podgoritsa	4 Level - A OFG	North-East	A OFG Targovishte
Benkovski (Salmanovo)	Salmanovo	Does Not Participate		
Benkovski (Simeonovgrad)	Simeonovgrad	4 Level - A OFG	South-East	A OFG Haskovo
Benkovski (Teteven)	Teteven	4 Level - A OFG	North-West	A OFG Lovech
Benkovski 2006 (Tsrancha)	Tsrancha	Does Not Participate		
Benkovski 2007 (Kriva bara)	Kriva bara	Does Not Participate		
Benkovski 53 (Saparevo)	Saparevo	4 Level - A OFG	South-West	A OFG Kyustendil - Rila
Beroe	Stara Zagora	1 Level - A Group	South-East	A PFG
Bioelit	Momino	Does Not Participate		
Birlik	Levski	Does Not Participate		
Bistritsa (Katuntsi)	Katuntsi	4 Level - A OFG	South-West	A OFG Blagoevgrad - Bistritsa
Bistritsa 2008 (Albanitsa)	Albanitsa	Does Not Participate		
Bozveliysko	Bozveliysko	4 Level - A OFG	North-East	A OFG Varna - South
Boila	Lozno	4 Level - A OFG	South-West	A OFG Kyustendil - Osogovo
Boychinov	Koilovtsi	5 Level - B OFG	North-West	B OFG Pleven - Center
Boychinovtsi	Boychinovtsi	4 Level - A OFG	North-West	A OFG Montana
Borba 10	Shiyakovo	4 Level - A OFG	North-West	A OFG Pleven
Borislav	Parvomay	4 Level - A OFG	South-East	A OFG Plovdiv
Bobov dol	Bobov dol	4 Level - A OFG	South-East	A OFG Sliven
Borovets 2002	Targovishte	Does Not Participate		
Borovo 2000	Borovo	4 Level - A OFG	North-West	A OFG Ruse - West
Botev (Boboshevo)	Boboshevo	4 Level - A OFG	South-West	A OFG Kyustendil - Rila
Botev (Bolyarovo)	Bolyarovo	4 Level - A OFG	South-East	A OFG Yambol
Botev (Brestak)	Brestak	4 Level - A OFG	North-East	A OFG Varna - North
Botev (Bardaski gegan)	Bardaski gegan	4 Level - A OFG	North-West	A OFG Vratsa - South
Botev (Vratsa)	Vratsa	2 Level - B Group	North-West	B PFG
Botev (Valchi tran)	Valchi tran	5 Level - B OFG	North-West	B OFG Pleven - East
Botev (General Inzovo)	General Inzovo	5 Level - B OFG	South-East	B OFG Yambol
Botev (Golyamo Vranovo)	Golyamo Vranovo	4 Level - A OFG	North-West	A OFG Ruse - East
Botev (Gramada)	Gramada	4 Level - A OFG	North-West	A OFG Vidin
Botev (Galabovo)	Galabovo	2 Level - B Group	South-East	B PFG
Botev (Debelets)	Debelets	4 Level - A OFG	North-West	A OFG Veliko Tarnovo - South
Botev (Dolna Mitropoliya)	Dolna Mitropoliya	5 Level - B OFG	North-West	B OFG Pleven - Center
Botev (Debar)	Parvomay	5 Level - B OFG	South-East	B OFG Plovdiv - East
Botev (Komarevo)	Komarevo	4 Level - A OFG	North-West	A OFG Pleven
Botev (Koprivets)	Koprivets	4 Level - A OFG	North-West	A OFG Ruse - West
Botev (Kraynitsi)	Kraynitsi	4 Level - A OFG	South-West	A OFG Kyustendil - Rila
Botev (Krivodol)	Krivodol	Does Not Participate		
Botev (Levski)	Levski	Does Not Participate		
Botev (Letnitsa)	Letnitsa	Does Not Participate		
Botev (Momina klisura)	Momina klisura	Does Not Participate		
Botev (Lukovit)	Lykovit	3 Level - V Group	North-West	North-West V AFG
Botev (Novi pazar)	Novi pazar	3 Level - V Group	North-East	North-East V AFG
Botev (Plovdiv)	Plovdiv	1 Level - A Group	South-East	A PFG
Botev (Popitsa)	Popitsa	4 Level - A OFG	North-West	A OFG Vratsa - South
Botev (Rogozen)	Rogozen	4 Level - A OFG	North-West	A OFG Vratsa - North
Botev (Rogosh)	Rogosh	5 Level - B OFG	South-East	B OFG Plovdiv - East
Botev (Ruptsi)	Ruptsi	5 Level - B OFG	North-West	B OFG Pleven - West
Botev (Tranchovitsa)	Tranchovitsa	5 Level - B OFG	North-West	B OFG Pleven - East
Botev (Chernogorovo)	Chernogorovo	4 Level - A OFG	South-West	A OFG Pazardzhik
Botev 1 (Batanovtsi)	Batanovtsi	4 Level - A OFG	South-West	A OFG Pernik - North
Botev 1921 (Zlataritsa)	Zlataritsa	4 Level - A OFG	North-West	A OFG Veliko Tarnovo - South
Botev 1921 (Ihtiman)	Ihtiman	3 Level - V Group	South-West	South-West V AFG
Botev 1930 (Kobilyak)	Kobilyak	5 Level - B OFG	North-West	B OFG Montana
Botev 1949 (Kermen)	Kermen	Does Not Participate		
Botev 2008 (Kozloduy)	Kozloduy	3 Level - V Group	North-West	North-West V AFG
Botev 2009 (Dzherman)	Dzherman	4 Level - A OFG	South-West	A OFG Kyustendil - Rila
Botev 2012 (Pudriya)	Pudriya	4 Level - A OFG	North-West	A OFG Vratsa - South
Botev D (Dimovo)	Dimovo	4 Level - A OFG	North-West	A OFG Vidin
Botev (Drugan)	Drygan	4 Level - A OFG	South-West	A OFG Pernik - South
Boyadzhik 2004	Boyadzhik	4 Level - A OFG	South-East	A OFG Yambol
Boyanovo 2012	Boyanovo	5 Level - B OFG	South-East	B OFG Yambol
Bradvari 08	Bradvari	4 Level - A OFG	North-East	A OFG Silistra - West
Bratanitsa	Bratanitsa	4 Level - A OFG	South-West	A OFG Pazatdzhik
Bratsigovo	Bratsigovo	4 Level - A OFG	South-West	A OFG Pazatdzhik
Brestnik 1948	Plovdiv	3 Level - V Group	South-East	South-East V AFG
Brestovitsa	Brestovitsa	Does Not Participate		
Buzludzha (Enina)	Enina	4 Level - A OFG	South-East	A OFG Stara Zagora
Buzludzha (Kyustendil)	Kyustendil	Does Not Participate		
Buzovo kale	Buzovgrad	4 Level - A OFG	South-East	A OFG Stara Zagora
Buyna Mesta	Musomishta	4 Level - A OFG	South-West	A OFG Blagoevgrad - Mesta East
Bukovo	Bukovo	Does Not Participate		
Bulldog	Aytos	5 Level - B OFG	South-East	B OFG Burgas - East
Burgos	Livada	5 Level - B OFG	South-East	B OFG Burgas - South
Burya (Gradsko)	Gradsko	4 Level - A OFG	South-East	A OFG Sliven
Burya (Kosharevo)	Kosharevo	4 Level - A OFG	South-West	A OFG Pernik - West
Badeshte 2010	Butovo	Does Not Participate		
Byala reka (Topolnitsa)	Topolnitsa	4 Level - A OFG	South-East	A OFG Burgas
Byala reka 1 (Zaychar)	Zaychar	5 Level - B OFG	South-East	B OFG Burgas - Center
Varna	Varna	Does Not Participate		
VVS	Sofia	Does Not Participate		
Vedrare	Vedrare	5 Level - B OFG	South-East	B OFG Plovdiv - North-West
Vekta	Plovdiv	Does Not Participate		
Velbazhd	Kyustendil	3 Level - V Group	South-West	South-West V AFG
Veliki Preslav	Veliki Preslav	3 Level - V Group	North-East	North-East V AFG
Velichkovo	Velichkovo	4 Level - A OFG	South-West	A OFG Pazardzhik
Venets	Oreshets railway station	4 Level - A OFG	North-West	A OFG Vidin
Ventsi	Iskar	5 Level - B OFG	North-West	B OFG Pleven - West
Vereya	Stara Zagora	3 Level - V Group	South-East	South-East V AFG
Verila	Dren	4 Level - A OFG	South-West	A OFG Pernik - South
Veselina	Veselina	Does Not Participate		
Vetovo 2007	Vetovo	Does Not Participate		
Vetren (Vetren)	Burgas	5 Level - B OFG	South-East	B OFG Burgas - South
Vetren (Polena)	Polena	4 Level - A OFG	South-West	A OFG Blagoevgrad - Bistritsa
Vetrino	Vetrino	4 Level - A OFG	North-East	A OFG Varna - North
Vidima (Dushevo)	Dushevo	5 Level - B OFG	North-West	B OFG Gabrovo
Vidima-Rakovski (Sevlievo)	Sevlievo	3 Level - V Group	North-West	North-West V AFG
Vinaya	Zgalevo	5 Level - B OFG	North-West	B OFG Pleven - Center
Vit	Dermantsi	Does Not Participate		
Vitanovtsi	Vitanovtsi	Does Not Participate		
Vitosha (Bistritsa)	Bistritsa	2 Level - B Group	South-West	B PFG
Vitosha (Dolna Dikanya)	Dolna Dikanya	Does Not Participate		
Vitski orli	Dolna Mitropoliya	Does Not Participate		
Vihren 1925	Sandanski	3 Level - V Group	South-West	South-West V AFG
Vihar (Aldomirovtsi)	Aldomirovtsi	4 Level - A OFG	South-West	A OFG Sofia - West
Vihar (Bahovitsa)	Bahovitsa	4 Level - A OFG	North-West	A OFG Lovech
Vihar (Belozem)	Belozem	4 Level - A OFG	South-East	A OFG Plovdiv
Vihar (Boil)	Boil	4 Level - A OFG	North-East	A OFG Silistra - East
Vihar (Borima)	Borima	Does Not Participate		
Vihar (Barziya)	Barziya	4 Level - A OFG	North-West	A OFG Montana
Vihar (Vetren)	Vetren	5 Level - B OFG	South-West	B OFG Pazardzhik - North
Vihar (Vladimirovtsi)	Vladimirovtsi	4 Level - A OFG	North-East	A OFG Razgrad - North
Vihar (Voyvodinovo)	Voyvodinovo	5 Level - B OFG	South-East	B OFG Plovdiv - East
Vihar (Voysil)	Voysil	5 Level - B OFG	South-East	B OFG Plovdiv - North-West
Vihar (Gulyantsi)	Gulyantsi	5 Level - B OFG	North-West	B OFG Pleven - Center
Vihar (Dobri dyal)	Dobri dyal	4 Level - A OFG	North-West	A OFG Veliko Tarnovo - South
Vihar (Zheglartsi)	Zheglartsi	4 Level - A OFG	North-East	A OFG Dobrich - West
Vihar (Zavet)	Zavet	4 Level - A OFG	North-East	A OFG Razgrad - East
Vihar (Kavrakirovo)	Kavrakirovo	4 Level - A OFG	South-West	A OFG Blagoevgrad - Struma 2
Vihar (Gorublyane)	Sofia	Does Not Participate		
Vihar (Trebich)	Sofia	4 Level - A OFG	South-West	A OFG Sofia - city
Vihar (Loznitsa)	Loznitsa	4 Level - A OFG	North-East	A OFG Razgrad - West
Vihar (Lopyan)	Lopyan	Does Not Participate		
Vihar (Lyuben)	Leemark	4 Level - A OFG	North-East	A OFG Silistra - East
Vihar (Marash)	Marash	Does Not Participate		
Vihar (Radanovo)	Radanovo	4 Level - A OFG	North-West	A OFG Veliko Tarnovo - North
Vihar (Ryahovtsite)	Ryahovtsite	5 Level - B OFG	North-West	B OFG Gabrovo
Vihar (Semerdzhievo)	Semerdzhievo	4 Level - A OFG	North-East	A OFG Ruse - East
Vihar (Stroevo)	Stroevo	5 Level - B OFG	South-East	B OFG Plovdiv - North-West
Vihar 1926 (Valchi dol)	Valchi dol	4 Level - A OFG	North-East	A OFG Varna - North
Vihar 1965 (Zlatograd)	Zlatograd	Does Not Participate		
Vihar 1969 (Boyan)	Boyan	4 Level - A OFG	North-East	A OFG Shumen - North
Vihar 2000 (Aytos)	Aytos	4 Level - A OFG	South-East	A OFG Burgas
Vihar 2006 (Graf Ignatievo)	Graf Ignatievo	5 Level - B OFG	South-East	B OFG Plovdiv - North-West
Vihar 23 (Nikolovo)	Nikolovo	4 Level - A OFG	North-West	A OFG Montana
Vihar 97 (Prevala)	Prevala	Does Not Participate		
Vihar S (Senokos)	Senokos	Does Not Participate		
Vladislav (Varna)	Varna	Does Not Participate		
Vladislav 2004 (Dzholyunitsa)	Dzholyunitsa	4 Level - A OFG	North-West	A OFG Veliko Tarnovo - South
Voyvoda	Dragash voyvoda	5 Level - B OFG	North-West	B OFG Pleven - East
Voynyagovo	Voynyagovo	5 Level - B OFG	South-East	B OFG Plovdiv - North-West
Vabel	Targovishte	4 Level - A OFG	North-East	A OFG Targovishte
Varba 1917	Radomir	4 Level - A OFG	South-West	A OFG Pernik - South
Varbitsa	Varbitsa	4 Level - A OFG	North-East	A OFG Shumen - South
Varbitsa 2006 (Benkovski)	Benkovski	4 Level - A OFG	South-East	A OFG Kardzhali
Varbitsa 2008 (Oreshe)	Oreshe	4 Level - A OFG	South-West	A OFG Blagoevgrad - Mesta West
Varshets 2012	Varshets	4 Level - A OFG	North-West	A OFG Montana
Vastanik	Voynegovtsi	4 Level - A OFG	North-West	A OFG Sofia - city
Vacha (Yoakim Gruevo)	Yoakim Gruevo	Does Not Participate		
Vacha (Kadievo)	Kadievo	5 Level - B OFG	South-East	B OFG Plovdiv - South-West
Gaber	Gabrovdol	5 Level - A OFG	South-West	A OFG Pernik - North
Gabrovnitsa 04	Gorno Sahrene	4 Level - A OFG	South-East	A OFG Stara Zagora
Gabar	Gaberovo	5 Level - B OFG	South-East	B OFG Burgas - South
Gagarin	Krumovo	5 Level - B OFG	South-West	B OFG Yambol
Galktika	Chernik	4 Level - A OFG	North-West	A OFG Silistra - East
Galatasaray	Malko Yonkovo	Does Not Participate		
Gelemenovo	Gelemenovo	5 Level - B OFG	South-West	B OFG Pazardzhik - North
Gerganin izvor	Biser	4 Level - A OFG	South-East	A OFG Haskovo
Gerena	Kyustendil	Does Not Participate		
Germaneya	Separeva banya	3 Level - V Group	South-West	South-West V AFG
Geroy	Zaychino oreshe	4 Level - A OFG	North-East	A OFG Shumen - South
Gigant (Belene)	Belene	3 Level - V Group	North-West	North-West V AFG
Gigant (Saedinenie)	Saedinenie	3 Level - V Group	South-East	South-East V AFG
Glodzhevo	Glodzhevo	4 Level - A OFG	North-East	A OFG Ruse - East
Golemi vrah	Dolna Sekirna	4 Level - A OFG	South-West	A OFG Pernik - North
Goloe	Lozarevo	5 Level - B OFG	South-East	B OFG Burgas - West
Goritsa	Ovchartsi	4 Level - A OFG	South-West	A OFG Kyustendil - Rila
Gorubso	Rudozem	Does Not Participate		
Gotse Delchev (Gorni Voden)	Asenovgrad	5 Level - B OFG	South-East	B OFG Plovdiv - South-West
Gradishte 1932	Gradishte	4 Level - A OFG	North-West	A OFG Pleven
Granit (Vladaya)	Vladaya	5 Level - B OFG	South-West	B OFG Sofia - city
Granit (Godeshevo)	Godeshevo	Does Not Participate		
Granit (Konyavo)	Konyavo	4 Level - A OFG	South-West	A OFG Kyustendil - Osogovo
Granit (Kanchevo)	Kanchevo	4 Level - A OFG	South-East	A OFG Stara Zagora
Granit (Sborishte)	Sborishte	4 Level - A OFG	South-East	A OFG Sliven
Granit (Slatina)	Slatina	Does Not Participate		
Granit (Shiroki gol)	Shiroki dol	4 Level - A OFG	South-West	A OFG Sofia - East
Granit 2012 (Skobelevo)	Skobelevo	4 Level - A OFG	South-East	A OFG Stara Zagora
Granichar (Koprivlen)	Koprivlen	4 Level - A OFG	South-West	A OFG Blagoevgrad - Mesta East
Granichar (Tuhovishta)	Tuhovishta	4 Level - A OFG	South-West	A OFG Blagoevgrad - Mesta West
Granichar 2008 (Dospat)	Dospat	4 Level - A OFG	South-East	A OFG Smolyan
Galabets	Galabets	5 Level - B OFG	South-East	B OFG Burgas - Center
Davidovo	Davidovo	Does Not Participate		
Dan Kolov	Sennik	5 Level - B OFG	North-West	B OFG Gabrovo
Debren	Debren	4 Level - A OFG	South-West	A OFG Blagoevgrad - Mesta East
Devin	Devin	4 Level - A OFG	South-East	A OFG Smolyan
Devnya	Devnya	Does Not Participate		
Dzhebel	Dzhebel	4 Level - A OFG	South-East	A OFG Kardzhali
Diana 1924	Pravda	Does Not Participate		
Divotino	Divotino	Does Not Participate		
Dimitrovgrad II	Dimitrovgrad	Does Not Participate		
Dimitrovets 1	Kovachevtsi	Does Not Participate		
Dimitrovgrad 1947	Dimitrovgrad	3 Level - V Group	South-East	South-East V AFG
Dimcha	Dimcha	5 Level - B OFG	North-West	B OFG Veliko Tarnovo
Dinamo (Izgrev)	Izgrev	5 Level - B OFG	North-West	B OFG Pleven - East
Dinamo 2011 (Stambolovo)	Stambolovo	4 Level - A OFG	North-East	A OFG Ruse - East
Dobrinishte	Dobrinishte	4 Level - A OFG	South-West	A OFG Blagoevgrad - Bistritsa
Dobromirka	Dobromirka	Does Not Participate		
Dobrudzha (Iskra)	Iskra	4 Level - A OFG	North-East	A OFG Silistra - West
Dobrudzha (Sitovo)	Sitovo	4 Level - A OFG	North-East	A OFG Silistra - West
Dobrudzha 1919 (Dobrich)	Dobrich	2 Level - B Group	North-East	B PFG
Dobrudzhanets (Ovcharovo)	Ovcharovo	4 Level - A OFG	North-East	A OFG Dobrich - West
Dobrudzhanets 2005 (Alfatar)	Alfatar	4 Level - A OFG	North-East	A OFG Silistra - West
Dobrudzhanski sportist	Stefan Karadzha	4 Level - A OFG	North-East	A OFG Dobrich - West
Dolen	Dolen	4 Level - A OFG	South-West	A OFG Blagoevgrad - Mesta West
Dolna Oryahovitsa	Dolna Oryahovitsa	5 Level - B OFG	North-West	B OFG Veliko Tarnovo
Dorostol 2003	Silistra	Does Not Participate		
Dragalevtsi	Sofia	Does Not Participate		
Dragoman	Dragoman	4 Level - A OFG	South-West	A OFG Sofia - West
Dren 2011	Dren	4 Level - A OFG	South-West	A OFG Pernik - South
Drenovets	Gornik	5 Level - B OFG	North-West	B OFG Pleven - West
Druzhba (Dobrovnitsa)	Dobrovnitsa	5 Level - B OFG	South-West	B OFG Pazardzhik - North
Druzhba (Lyulyakovo)	Lyulyakovo	4 Level - A OFG	North-East	A OFG Dobrich - East
Druzhba (Meshtitsa)	Meshtitsa	4 Level - A OFG	South-West	A OFG Pernik - North
Dulovo 2006	Dulovo	4 Level - A OFG	North-East	A OFG Silistra - East
Dunav (Vardim)	Vardim	5 Level - B OFG	North-West	B OFG Veliko Tarnovo
Dunav (Gigen)	Gigen	5 Level - B OFG	North-East	B OFG Pleven - West
Dunav (Dunavtsi)	Dunavtsi	4 Level - A OFG	North-West	A OFG Vidin
Dunav (Slivo pole)	Slivo pole	4 Level - A OFG	North-East	A OFG Ruse - East
Dunav 09 (Leskovets)	Leskovets	Does Not Participate		
Dunav 2010 (Ruse)	Ruse	2 Level - B Group	North-East	B PFG
Dunav 98 (Selanovtsi)	Selanovtsi	Does Not Participate		
Dunarit	Nikolovo	4 Level - A OFG	North-East	A OFG Ruse - East
Dabene	Dabene	Does Not Participate		
Dabrava	Osanets	4 Level - A OFG	North-East	A OFG Shumen - North
Dyankovo	Dyankovo	Does Not Participate		
Evrokolezh	Plovdiv	3 Level - V Group	South-East	South-East V AFG
Edinstvo (Gurkovo)	Gurkovo	4 Level - A OFG	North-East	A OFG Stara Zagora
Edinstvo (Dolni Dabnik)	Dolni Dabnik	4 Level - A OFG	North-East	A OFG Pleven
Edinstvo (Kitanchevo)	Kitanchevo	4 Level - A OFG	North-East	A OFG Razgrad - North
Edinstvo (Targovishte)	Targovishte	Does Not Participate		
Edinstvo 2005 (Dabnitsa)	Dabnitsa	4 Level - A OFG	South-East	A OFG Blagoevgrad - Mesta East
Ezerche	Ezerche	4 Level - A OFG	North-East	A OFG Razgrad - West
Eleshnitsa	Vaksevo	4 Level - A OFG	South-West	A OFG Kyustendil - Osogovo
Elit	Sofia	5 Level - B OFG	South-West	B OFG Sofia - city
Eltemir	Kran	4 Level - A OFG	South-East	A OFG Stara Zagora
Elhovo	Elhovo	4 Level - A OFG	South-East	A OFG Yambol
Endzhe	Tsarev brod	4 Level - A OFG	North-East	A OFG Shumen - South
Enev	Dibich	4 Level - A OFG	North-East	A OFG Shumen - South
Energitik	Pernik	4 Level - A OFG	South-West	A OFG Pernik - West
Era	Sevlievo	4 Level - A OFG	North-West	A OFG Gabrovo
Erma	Tran	4 Level - A OFG	South-East	A OFG Pernik - West
Etar	Veliko Tarnovo	3 Level - V Group	North-West	North-West V AFG
Zheleznitsa	Zheleznitsa	4 Level - A OFG	South-West	A OFG Sofia - city
Zhilentsi	Zhilentsi	Does Not Participate		
Zhitnitsa	Zhitnitsa	4 Level - A OFG	South-East	A OFG Plovdiv
ZSK Ihtiman	Ihtiman	4 Level - A OFG	South-West	A OFG Sofia - East
Zavod 12	Sofia	Does Not Participate		
Zagorets	Nova Zagora	3 Level - V Group	South-East	South-East V AFG
Zapadno eho	Begunovtsi	4 Level - A OFG	South-West	A OFG Pernik - West
Zarya (Krushare)	Krushare	Does Not Participate		
Zarya (Todor Ikonomovo)	Todor Ikonomovo	Does Not Participate		
Zarya 2006 (Krushari)	Krushari	4 Level - A OFG	North-East	A OFG Dobrich - West
Zarya 2006 (Tsar Samuil)	Tsal Samuil	4 Level - A OFG	North-East	A OFG Silistra - West
Zarya Zvegor 1963	Zvegor	4 Level - A OFG	North-East	A OFG Shumen - North
Zvezda	Studenitsa	4 Level - A OFG	North-East	A OFG Shumen - North
Zvezdets	Gorna Malina	4 Level - A OFG	South-West	A OFG Sofia - East
Zdravets (Gruevo)	Gruevo	Does Not Participate		
Zdravets (Zdravets)	Zdravets	Does Not Participate		
Zemedelets-Elit	Kozlovets	4 Level - A OFG	North-West	A OFG Veliko Tarnovo - North
Zenit (Vetren dol)	Vetren dol	5 Level - B OFG	South-West	B OFG Pazardzhik - South
Zenit (Pamukchii)	Pamukchii	Does Not Participate		
Zenit 2012 (Pravoslaven)	Pravoslaven	5 Level - B OFG	South-East	B OFG Plovdiv - East
ZKMO	Barakovo	Does Not Participate		
Zlaten klas	Blagoevo	4 Level - A OFG	North-East	A OFG Razgrad - West
Iva	Borovets	4 Level - A OFG	South-West	A OFG Kyustendil - Rila
Ignatievo	Ignatievo	Does Not Participate		
Izvor AM	Gortski Izvor	4 Level - A OFG	South-East	A OFG Haskovo
Izgrev (Meden kladenets)	Meden kladenets	5 Level - B OFG	South-East	B OFG Yambol
Izgrev (Yablanitsa)	Yablanitsa	4 Level - A OFG	North-West	A OFG Lovech
Izgrev 93 (Tsarevets)	Tsarevets	4 Level - A OFG	North-West	A OFG Veliko Tarnovo - North
Izgtrebitel	Novo Delchevo	4 Level - A OFG	South-West	A OFG Blagoevgrad - Struma 1
Ilinden (Klyuch)	Klyuch	4 Level - A OFG	South-West	A OFG Blagoevgrad - Struma 2
Ilinden 2005	Ilinden	Does Not Participate		
Imrenchevo	Imrenchevo	4 Level - A OFG	North-East	A OFG Shumen - South
Iskra (General Kiselovo)	General Kiselovo	4 Level - A OFG	North-East	A OFG Varna - North
Iskra (Golyamo gradishte)	Golyamo gradishte	4 Level - A OFG	North-East	A OFG Targovishte
Iskra (Iskrets)	Iskrets	Does Not Participate		
Iskra (Chernoochene)	Chernoochene	4 Level - A OFG	South-East	A OFG Kardzhali
Iskra 2009 (Iskrets)	Iskrets	4 Level - A OFG	South-West	A OFG Sofia - West
Iskra 41 (Benkovski)	Benkovski	4 Level - A OFG	North-East	A OFG Dobrich - West
Iskar (Dolni Lukovit)	Dolni Lukovit	5 Level - B OFG	North-West	B OFG Pleven - West
Iskar (Orehovitsa)	Orehovitsa	Does Not Participate		
Iskar 1923 (Roman)	Roman	4 Level - A OFG	North-West	A OFG Vratsa - South
Iskar 2005 (Lakatnik RS)	Lakatnik railway station	4 Level - A OFG	South-West	A OFG Sofia - West
Yaldaram	Yarebitsa	4 Level - A OFG	North-East	A OFG Silistra - East
Kabile	Kabile	5 Level - B OFG	South-East	B OFG Yambol
Kabiyuk	Konyovets	Does Not Participate		
Kableshkovo 07	Kableshkovo	Does Not Participate		
Kazichene	Kazichene	Does Not Participate		
Kale (Krepcha)	Krepcha	Does Not Participate		
Kalabak	Samuilovo	4 Level - A OFG	South-West	A OFG Blagoevgrad - Struma 2
Kale (Ruyno)	Ruyno	4 Level - A OFG	North-East	A OFG Silistra - East
Kale 09 (Nova mahala)	Nova mahala	5 Level - B OFG	South-West	B OFG Pazardzhik - South
Kaliakra	Kavarna	2 Level - B Group	North-East	B PFG
Kaloyanovo	Kaloyanovo	4 Level - A OFG	South-East	A OFG Plovdiv
Kalchevo	Kalchevo	4 Level - A OFG	South-East	A OFG Yambol
Kamenar	Kamenar	4 Level - A OFG	North-East	A OFG Razgrad - West
Kameno	Kameno	4 Level - A OFG	South-East	A OFG Burgas
Kamchiets	Dalgopol	4 Level - A OFG	North-East	A OFG Varna - South
Kamchiyski sokol	Dabravino	Does Not Participate		
Kanina	Garmen	4 Level - A OFG	South-West	A OFG Blagoevgrad - Mesta East
Karadzhalovo 2011	Karadzhalovo	5 Level - B OFG	South-East	B OFG Plovdiv - East
Karnobat	Karnobat	4 Level - A OFG	South-East	A OFG Burgas
Keramik	Elin Pelin railway station	4 Level - A OFG	South-East	A OFG Sofia - East
Kilifarevo	Kilifarevo	Does Not Participate		
Kiprovets	Chiprovtsi	4 Level - A OFG	North-West	A OFG Montana
Kitka	Vitanovtsi	4 Level - A OFG	South-East	A OFG Pernik - West
Klikach	Klikach	5 Level - B OFG	South-East	B OFG Burgas - West
Koba	Radilovo	5 Level - B OFG	South-West	B OFG Pazardzhik - South
Kom (Berkovitsa)	Berkovitsa	3 Level - V Group	North-West	North-West V AFG
Kom (Godech)	Godech	4 Level - A OFG	South-West	A OFG Sofia - West
Kom-Minyor (Berkovitsa)	Berkovitsa	4 Level - A OFG	North-West	A OFG Montana
Komatevo 2001	Plovdiv	Does Not Participate		
Komuna 2011	Chernogorovo	5 Level - B OFG	South-West	B OFG Pazardzhik - North
Koneliano /Conegliano/	German	5 Level - B OFG	South-West	B OFG Sofia - city
Kopie	Kopilovtsi	4 Level - A OFG	South-West	A OFG Kyustendil - Osogovo
Koprivlen	Koprivlen	Does Not Participate		
Kornitsa	Kornitsa	4 Level - A OFG	South-West	A OFG Blagoevgrad - Mesta West
Korten 2012	Korten	4 Level - A OFG	South-East	A OFG Sliven
Kosmos (Boyantsi)	Boyantsi	5 Level - B OFG	South-East	B OFG Plovdiv - South-West
Kosmos (Branichevo)	Branichevo	4 Level - A OFG	North-East	A OFG Shumen - North
Kosmos (Grivitsa)	Grivitsa	5 Level - B OFG	North-West	B OFG Pleven - Center
Kosmos (Kamenets)	Kamenets	5 Level - B OFG	North-West	B OFG Pleven - East
Kostievo	Kostievo	Does Not Participate		
Kostinbrod	Kostinbrod	Does Not Participate		
Kotel	Kotel	4 Level - A OFG	South-East	A OFG Sliven
Kochan	Kochan	4 Level - A OFG	South-West	A OFG Blagoevgrad - Mesta West
Kochovo	Kochovo	4 Level - A OFG	North-East	A OFG Shumen - South
Kraishte	Kraishte	4 Level - A OFG	South-East	A OFG Blagoevgrad - Bistritsa
Kremikovtsi	Sofia	5 Level - B OFG	South-West	B OFG Sofia - city
Krichim	Krichim	4 Level - A OFG	South-East	A OFG Plovdiv
Kubrat 2007	Kubrat	3 Level - V Group	North-East	North-East V AFG
Kula 04	Kula	4 Level - A OFG	North-West	A OFG Vidin
Kyustendil	Kyustendil	4 Level - A OFG	South-West	A OFG Kyustendil - Osogovo
Lavrov	Gorni Dabnik	5 Level - B OFG	North-West	B OFG Pleven - West
Lazur	Sirishtnik	Does Not Participate		
Lato	Alekovo	4 Level - A OFG	North-West	A OFG Veliko Tarnovo - North
Levski (Brest)	Brest	4 Level - A OFG	North-West	A OFG Pleven
Levski (Gorna Mitropoliya)	Gorna Mitropoliya	5 Level - B OFG	North-West	B OFG Pleven - West
Levski (Egalnitsa)	Egalnitsa	4 Level - A OFG	South-West	A OFG Pernik - South
Levski (Karamanovo)	Karamanovo	4 Level - A OFG	North-East	A OFG Ruse - West
Levski (Karlovo)	Karlovo	3 Level - V Group	South-East	South-East V AFG
Levski (Dragalevtsi)	Sofia	4 Level - A OFG	South-West	A OFG Sofia - city
Levski (Komoshtitsa)	Komoshtitsa	5 Level - B OFG	North-West	B OFG Montana
Levski (Kocherinovo)	Kocherinovo	4 Level - A OFG	South-West	A OFG Kyustendil - Rila
Levski (Lyaskovets)	Lyaskovets	4 Level - A OFG	North-West	A OFG Veliko Tarnovo - South
Levski (Mladovo)	Mladovo	Does Not Participate		
Levski (Novgrad)	Novgrad	4 Level - A OFG	North-East	A OFG Ruse - West
Levski (Odarne)	Odarne	5 Level - B OFG	North-West	B OFG Pleven - East
Levski (Omyrtag)	Omurtag	4 Level - A OFG	North-East	A OFG Targovishte
Levski (Patalenitsa)	Patalenitsa	4 Level - A OFG	South-West	A OFG Pazardzhik
Levski (Pisarovo)	Pisarovo	5 Level - B OFG	North-West	B OFG Pleven - West
Levski (Podayva)	Podayva	4 Level - A OFG	North-East	A OFG Razgrad - North
Levski (Sofia)	Sofia	1 Level - A Group	South-West	A PFG
Levski (Suhache)	Suhache	5 Level - B OFG	North-West	B OFG Pleven - West
Levski (Chepintsi - Smolyan)	Chepintsi (Sm)	Does Not Participate		
Levski (Chepintsi - Sofia)	Chepintsi (Sf)	4 Level - A OFG	South-West	A OFG Sofia - city
Levski 1923 (Elin Pelin)	Elin Pelin	4 Level - A OFG	South-West	A OFG Sofia - East
Levski 1986 (Strazhitsa)	Strazhitsa	4 Level - A OFG	North-West	A OFG Veliko Tarnovo - South
Levski 2005 (Krumovgrad)	Krumovgrad	4 Level - A OFG	South-East	A OFG Kardzhali
Levski 2007 (Dolna banya)	Dolna banya	4 Level - A OFG	South-West	A OFG Sofia - East
Levski 2007 (Krupnik)	Krupnik	4 Level - A OFG	South-West	A OFG Blagoevgrad - Bistritsa
Levski 2007 (Levski)	Levski	3 Level - V Group	North-West	North-West V AFG
Levski 2012 (Lom)	Lom	4 Level - A OFG	North-West	A OFG Montana
Levski 96 (Glavinitsa)	Glavinitsa	4 Level - A OFG	North-East	A OFG Silistra - West
Levski Vida Olimeks	Pokrayna	Does Not Participate		
Lencho	Yakimovo	4 Level - A OFG	North-West	A OFG Montana
Lesichovo	Lesichovo	5 Level - B OFG	South-West	B OFG Pazardzhik - North
Lider	Yagodovo	5 Level - B OFG	South-East	B OFG Plovdiv - South-West
Lipa	Cheresha	5 Level - B OFG	South-East	B OFG Burgas - West
Lipen	Lipen	Does Not Participate		
Lisets	Osikovo	4 Level - A OFG	South-West	A OFG Blagoevgrad - Mesta West
Litex	Lovech	1 Level - A Group	North-West	A PFG
Lovsko	Lovsko	4 Level - A OFG	North-East	A OFG Razgrad - West
Lozen	Lozen	4 Level - A OFG	North-West	A OFG Veliko Tarnovo - South
Lozen 2006 (Suhindol)	Suhindol	4 Level - A OFG	North-West	A OFG Veliko Tarnovo - North
Lokomotiv (Vakarel)	Vakarel	4 Level - A OFG	South-West	A OFG Sofia - East
Lokomotiv (General Todorov)	General Todorov	4 Level - A OFG	South-West	A OFG Blagoevgrad - Struma 1
Lokomotiv (Gorna Oryahovitsa)	Gorna Oryahovitsa	3 Level - V Group	North-West	North-West V AFG
Lokomotiv (Damyanitsa)	Damyanitsa	4 Level - A OFG	South-West	A OFG Blagoevgrad - Struma 1
Lokomotiv (Dryanovo)	Dryanovo	4 Level - A OFG	North-West	A OFG Gabrovo
Lokomotiv (Mezdra)	Mezdra	Does Not Participate		
Lokomotiv (Ruse)	Ruse	Does Not Participate		
Lokomotiv (Samuil)	Samuil	4 Level - A OFG	North-East	A OFG Razgrad - West
Lokomotiv (Septemvri)	Septemvri	5 Level - B OFG	South-West	B OFG Pazardzhik - North
Lokomotiv (Sofia)	Sofia	1 Level - A Group	South-West	A PFG
Lokomotiv (Stara Zagora)	Stara Zagora	Does Not Participate		
Lokomotiv (Han Krum)	Han Krum	Does Not Participate		
Lokomotiv (Chernograd)	Chernograd	5 Level - B OFG	South-East	B OFG Burgas - West
Lokomotiv 101 (Sofia)	Sofia	5 Level - B OFG	South-West	B OFG Sofia - city
Lokomotiv 1926 (Plovdiv)	Plovdiv	1 Level - A Group	South-East	A PFG
Lokomotiv 2008 (Kaspichan)	Kaspichan	Does Not Participate		
Lokomotiv 2012 (Mezdra)	Mezdra	3 Level - V Group	North-West	North-West V AFG
Ludogorets (Dobroplodno)	Dobroplodno	4 Level - A OFG	North-East	A OFG Varna - North
Ludogorets (Kaolinovo)	Kaolinovo	4 Level - A OFG	North-East	A OFG Shumen - North
Ludogorets 1945 (Razgrad)	Razgrad	1 Level - A Group	North-East	A PFG
Ludogorets 2011 (Paisievo)	Paisievo	4 Level - A OFG	North-East	A OFG Silistra - East
Laki 2004	Laki	5 Level - B OFG	South-East	B OFG Plovdiv - South-West
Lyubimets (Tarnava)	Tarnava	4 Level - A OFG	North-West	A OFG Vratsa - South
Lyubimets 2007	Lyubimets	1 Level - A Group	South-East	A PFG
Lyublyana	Lyuben	4 Level - A OFG	North-East	A OFG Targovishte
Lyulin	Sofia	4 Level - A OFG	South-West	A OFG Sofia - city
Lyulyak	Lyulyakovo	5 Level - B OFG	South-East	B OFG Burgas - West
Lyuta	Vladimirovo	5 Level - B OFG	North-West	B OFG Montana
Lyaksi	Novo Leksi	4 Level - A OFG	South-West	A OFG Blagoevgrad - Mesta West
Madan	Madan	4 Level - A OFG	South-East	A OFG Smolyan
Madara 2010	Madara	4 Level - A OFG	North-East	A OFG Shumen - South
Malexh 1040	Mikrevo	4 Level - A OFG	South-West	A OFG Blagoevgrad - Struma 1
Manastirishte 2000	Manastirishte	4 Level - A OFG	North-West	A OFG Vratsa - North
Manish (Tsarkva)	Pernik	4 Level - A OFG	South-West	A OFG Pernik - West
Manklich	Manolich	5 Level - B OFG	South-West	B OFG Burgas - West
Marek 2010	Dupnitsa	2 Level - B Group	South-West	B PFG
Marisan	Ruse	4 Level - A OFG	North-East	A OFG Ruse - East
Maritsa (Belovo)	Belovo	4 Level - A OFG	South-West	A OFG Pazardzhik
Maritsa (Krum)	Krum	Does Not Participate		
Maritsa (Menenkyovo)	Menenkyovo	5 Level - B OFG	South-West	B OFG Pazardzhik - North
Maritsa (Milevo)	Milevo	5 Level - B OFG	South-East	B OFG Plovdiv - East
Maritsa (Ognyanovo)	Ognyanovo	4 Level - A OFG	South-West	A OFG Pazardzhik
Maritsa (Plovdiv)	Plovdiv	4 Level - A OFG	South-East	A OFG Plovdiv
Maritsa (Tsalapitsa)	Tsalapitsa	Does Not Participate		
Maritsa (Yasno pole)	Yasno pole	5 Level - B OFG	South-East	B OFG Plovdiv - South-West
Maritsa 1951 (Lyubenovo)	Parvomay	5 Level - B OFG	South-East	B OFG Plovdiv - East
Maritsa 2003 (Manole)	Manole	4 Level - A OFG	South-East	A OFG Plovdiv
Maritsa 2006 (Gradina)	Gradina	5 Level - B OFG	South-East	B OFG Plovdiv - East
Mariya Luiza	Lom	Does Not Participate		
Master	Burgas	3 Level - V Group	South-East	South-East V AFG
Mezhda	Mezhda	5 Level - B OFG	South-East	B OFG Yambol
Mesembriya	Nesebar	4 Level - A OFG	South-East	A OFG Burgas
Mesta 2005	Hadzhidimovo	3 Level - V Group	South-West	South-West V AFG
Metalik 1938	Sopot	5 Level - B OFG	South-East	B OFG Plovdiv - North-West
Metalurg (Pernik)	Pernik	Does Not Participate		
MIG 2010	Devnya	Does Not Participate		
Miziya	Miziya	4 Level - A OFG	North-West	A OFG Vratsa - North
Mizia 2005	Knezha	4 Level - A OFG	North-West	A OFG Pleven
Malinovo 2007	Malinovo	Does Not Participate		
Milkovitsa 09	Milkovitsa	5 Level - B OFG	North-East	B OFG Pleven - East
Mineral (Ovoshtnik)	Ovoshtnik	4 Level - A OFG	South-East	A OFG Stara Zagora
Mineral (Ognyanovo)	Ognyanovo	Does Not Participate		
Mineral (Rudartsi)	Rudartsi	4 Level - A OFG	South-West	A OFG Pernik - North
Mini Maritsa - iztok	Radnevo	4 Level - A OFG	South-East	A OFG Stara Zagora
Minyor (Bobov dol)	Bobov dol	Does Not Participate		
Minyor (Eleshnitsa)	Eleshnitsa	4 Level - A OFG	South-East	A OFG Blagoevgrad - Bistritsa
Minyor (Elshitsa)	Elshitsa	5 Level - B OFG	South-West	B OFG Pazardzhik - North
Minyor (Pernik)	Pernik	3 Level - V Group	South-West	South-West V AFG
Minyor (Radnevo)	Radnevo	3 Level - V Group	South-East	South-East V AFG
Minyor (Rudnik)	Rudnik	5 Level - B OFG	South-East	B OFG Burgas - South
Minyor (Senovo)	Senovo	4 Level - A OFG	North-East	A OFG Razgrad - West
Minyor 1934 (Rudinik)	Rudnik	4 Level - A OFG	South-East	A OFG Burgas
Mirkovo	Mirkovo	4 Level - A OFG	South-West	A OFG Sofia - East
Mlada gvardiya	Rozovo	4 Level - A OFG	South-East	A OFG Stara Zagora
Mladost (Ekzarh Yosif)	Ekzarh Yosif	4 Level - A OFG	North-East	A OFG Ruse - West
Mladost (Zlatovrah)	Zlatovrah	5 Level - B OFG	South-East	B OFG Plovdiv - South-West
Mokrash 2005	Mokresh	Does Not Participate		
Momino	Momino selo	5 Level - B OFG	South-East	B OFG Plovdiv - East
Monolit	Manastirishte	4 Level - A OFG	North-West	A OFG Vratsa - South
Montana 1921	Montana	2 Level - B Group	North-West	B PFG
Morena	Kladnitsa	Does Not Participate		
Mortagonovo	Mortagonovo	4 Level - A OFG	North-East	A OFG Razgrad - West
Most	Most	4 Level - A OFG	South-East	A OFG Kardzhali
Musala	Rila	4 Level - A OFG	South-West	A OFG Kyustendil - Rila
Malniya	Kliment	4 Level - A OFG	North-East	A OFG Shumen - North
Mativir	Ihtiman	4 Level - A OFG	South-East	A OFG Sofia - East
Nadezhda 1926	Oryahovo	4 Level - A OFG	North-West	A OFG Vratsa - North
Nevrokop	Gotse Delchev	4 Level - A OFG	South-East	A OFG Blagoevgrad - Mesta East
Nedan	Nedan	4 Level - A OFG	North-West	A OFG Veliko Tarnovo - North
Nesebar (Nesebar)	Nesebar	3 Level - V Group	South-East	South-East V AFG
Nesebar (Sunny Beach)	Sunny Beach	5 Level - B OFG	South-East	B OFG Burgas - East
Neftohimic 1962	Burgas	1 Level - A Group	South-East	A PFG
Neftyanik 2010	Shabla	4 Level - A OFG	North-East	A OFG Dobrich - East
Nikola Kozlevo 2004	Nikola Kozlevo	4 Level - A OFG	North-East	A OFG Shumen - North
Nova Cherna	Nova Cherna	Does Not Participate		
Novi Iskar	Novi Iskar	4 Level - A OFG	South-East	A OFG Sofia - city
Novosel	Novosel	Does Not Participate		
Obedinenie	Vasilevo	4 Level - A OFG	South-East	A OFG Dobrich - East
Obelya	Sofia	Does Not Participate		
Obzor	Obzor	5 Level - B OFG	South-East	B OFG Burgas - East
Obnova	Obnova	5 Level - B OFG	North-West	B OFG Pleven - East
Oborishte	Panagyurishte	3 Level - V Group	South-West	South-West V AFG
Ogosta	Hayredin	4 Level - A OFG	North-West	A OFG Vratsa - North
Ograzhdenets	Karnalovo	4 Level - A OFG	South-West	A OFG Blagoevgrad - Struma 2
Okolchitsa	Moravitsa	4 Level - A OFG	North-West	A OFG Vratsa - South
Old House	Kavarna	4 Level - A OFG	North-East	A OFG Dobrich - East
Olimpik (Burgas)	Burgas	4 Level - A OFG	South-East	A OFG Burgas
Olimpik 2000 (Teteven)	Teteven	4 Level - A OFG	North-West	A OFG Lovech
Orel (Gluhar)	Gluhar	Does Not Participate		
Orel (Lebnitsa)	Lebnitsa	4 Level - A OFG	South-West	A OFG Blagoevgrad - Struma 1
Orel (Razdeltsi)	Razdeltsi	Does Not Participate		
Orel 19 (Oryahovo)	Oryahovo	4 Level - A OFG	North-West	A OFG Vratsa - North
Orelyak	Lazhnitsa	4 Level - A OFG	South-West	A OFG Blagoevgrad - Mesta West
Orizare	Orizare	4 Level - A OFG	South-East	A OFG Burgas
Orlite (Nadarevo)	Nadarevo	Does Not Participate		
Orlite (Stefan Karadzha)	Stefan Karadzha	Does Not Participate		
Orlovets 2008 (Pobeda)	Pobeda	4 Level - A OFG	North-East	A OFG Dobrich - West
Orlovets 94 (Gabrovo)	Gabrovo	4 Level - A OFG	North-West	A OFG Gabrovo
Osmar	Osmar	Does Not Participate		
Osogovo	Bagrentsi	4 Level - A OFG	South-West	A OFG Kyustendil - Osogovo
Osam	Kozar Belene	5 Level - B OFG	North-West	B OFG Pleven - East
Pirin (Blagoevgrad)	Blagoevgrad	3 Level - V Group	South-West	South-West V AFG
Pavlikeni	Pavlikeni	3 Level - V Group	North-West	North-West V AFG
Pazardzhik 2012	Pazardzhik	5 Level - B OFG	South-West	B OFG Pazardzhik - North
Palamara	Venets	4 Level - A OFG	North-East	A OFG Shumen - North
Palankite	Byala palanka	4 Level - A OFG	South-East	A OFG Sliven
Panayot Hitov	Tutrakan	4 Level - A OFG	North-East	A OFG Silistra - West
Partizan (Cherven bryag)	Cherven bryag	3 Level - V Group	North-West	North-West V AFG
Partizan (Yardzhilovtsi)	Yardzhilovtsi	Does Not Participate		
Partizani (Gradina)	Gradina	Does Not Participate		
Partizani (Makresh)	Makresh	4 Level - A OFG	North-West	A OFG Vidin
Pautaliya	Sovolyano	4 Level - A OFG	South-West	A OFG Kyustendil - Osogovo
Pelezo	Pelishat	Does Not Participate		
Perperikon	Perperek	4 Level - A OFG	South-East	A OFG Kardzhali
Perun	Kresna	3 Level - V Group	South-West	South-West V AFG
Pirin (Breznitsa)	Breznitsa	4 Level - A OFG	South-West	A OFG Blagoevgrad - Mesta East
Pirin (Gotse Delchev)	Gotse Delchev	1 Level - A Group	South-West	A PFG
Pirin (Zemen)	Zemen	4 Level - A OFG	South-West	A OFG Pernik - North
Pirin (Razlog)	Razlog	2 Level - B Group	South-West	B PFG
Planinets	Godlevo	4 Level - A OFG	South-West	A OFG Blagoevgrad - Bistritsa
Plastik	Staropatitsa	4 Level - A OFG	North-West	A OFG Vidin
Pletena	Pletena	Does Not Participate		
Pobeda (Vresovo)	Vresovo	Does Not Participate		
Pobeda (Gradnitsa)	Gradnitsa	Does Not Participate		
Pobeda (Kesarevo)	Kesarevo	5 Level - B OFG	North-West	B OFG Veliko Tarnovo
Pobeda (Kolobar)	Kolobar	4 Level - A OFG	North-East	A OFG Silistra - East
Pobeda (Palamartsa)	Palamartsa	4 Level - A OFG	North-East	A OFG Targovishte
Pobeda (Pobeda)	Pobeda	4 Level - A OFG	South-East	A OFG Yambol
Pobeda (Pristoe)	Pristoe	4 Level - A OFG	North-East	A OFG Shumen - North
Pobeda (Tsaratsovo)	Tsaratsovo	5 Level - B OFG	South-East	B OFG Plovdiv - North-West
Pobeda 2009 (Vokil)	Vokil	4 Level - A OFG	North-East	A OFG Silistra - East
Podgorets	Kolarovo	4 Level - A OFG	South-West	A OFG Blagoevgrad - Struma 2
Pomorie	Pomorie	Does Not Participate		
Popovitsa	Popovitsa	5 Level - B OFG	South-East	B OFG Plovdiv - East
Pordim	Pordim	4 Level - A OFG	North-West	A OFG Pleven
Porominovo	Porominovo	Does Not Participate		
Pravda 1944	Pravda	4 Level - A OFG	North-East	A OFG Silistra - East
Pravets	Pravets	4 Level - A OFG	South-West	A OFG Sofia - West
Pretsiz Inter	Ivanovo	Does Not Participate		
Prista 2000 (Sredna kula)	Ruse	4 Level - A OFG	North-East	A OFG Ruse - East
Provadiya	Provadiya	3 Level - V Group	North-East	North-East V AFG
Prosenik	Prosenik	5 Level - B OFG	South-East	B OFG Burgas - Center
Parvomay	Parvomay	4 Level - A OFG	South-West	A OFG Blagoevgrad - Struma 2
Parvomaytsi	Parvomaytsi	4 Level - A OFG	North-West	A OFG Veliko Tarnovo - South
Pastrina 2012	Montana	4 Level - A OFG	North-West	A OFG Montana
Ravda 1954	Ravda	5 Level - B OFG	South-East	B OFG Burgas - East
Ravnets 2011	Ravnets	5 Level - B OFG	South-East	B OFG Burgas - South
Radinovo 2006	Radinovo	5 Level - B OFG	South-East	B OFG Plovdiv - North-West
Raketa (Preselets)	Preselets	4 Level - A OFG	North-East	A OFG Targovishte
Raketa 1111 (Bukovlak)	Bukovlak	4 Level - A OFG	North-West	A OFG Pleven
Rakovski (Ivaylovgrad)	Ivaylovgrad	4 Level - A OFG	South-East	A OFG Haskovo
Rakovski (Ruse)	Ruse	Does Not Participate		
Rakovski 2005 (Kalipetrovo)	Kalipetrovo	4 Level - A OFG	North-East	A OFG Silistra - West
Rakovski 2011 (Rakovski)	Rakovski	2 Level - B Group	South-East	B PFG
Rapid (Dividyanovo)	Shumen	Does Not Participate		
Rasovo	Rasovo	4 Level - A OFG	North-West	A OFG Montana
Rafo spor	Stroevo	5 Level - B OFG	South-East	B OFG Plovdiv - South-West
Ratsiara	Archr	4 Level - A OFG	North-West	A OFG Vidin
Relax	Oven	4 Level - A OFG	North-East	A OFG Silistra - East
Republikanets (Enevo)	Enevo	Does Not Participate		
Republikanets (Lisets)	Lisets	4 Level - A OFG	North-West	A OFG Lovech
Resen 2012	Resen	4 Level - A OFG	North-West	A OFG Veliko Tarnovo - South
Rila	Belitsa	4 Level - A OFG	South-West	A OFG Blagoevgrad - Bistritsa
Rilets (Govedartsi)	Govedartsi	4 Level - A OFG	South-West	A OFG Sofia - East
Rilets 1948 (Resilovo)	Resilovo	4 Level - A OFG	South-West	A OFG Kyustendil - Rila
Rilski orli	Bistritsa	Does Not Participate		
Rilski sportist	Samokov	Does Not Participate		
Riltsi (Riltsi)	Dobrich	4 Level - A OFG	North-East	A OFG Dobrich - West
Riltsi 2006 (Riltsi)	Riltsi	4 Level - A OFG	South-West	A OFG Blagoevgrad - Bistritsa
Rodopa (Ribnovo)	Ribnovo	4 Level - A OFG	South-West	A OFG Blagoevgrad - Mesta West
Rodopa (Smolyan)	Smolyan	4 Level - A OFG	South-East	A OFG Smolyan
Rodopi (Debrashtitsa)	Debrashtitsa	5 Level - B OFG	South-West	B OFG Pazardzhik - South
Rodopi (Satovcha)	Satovcha	Does Not Participate		
Rodopi 1921 (Kozarsko)	Kozarsko	5 Level - B OFG	South-West	B OFG Pazardzhik - South
Rodopi 1935 (Momchilgrad)	Momchilgrad	4 Level - A OFG	South-East	A OFG Kardzhali
Rodopski sokol	Kardzhali	Does Not Participate		
Rozova dolina	Kazanlak	3 Level - V Group	South-East	South-East V AFG
Roma	Topolanche	Does Not Participate		
Ropotamo	Primorsko	4 Level - A OFG	South-East	A OFG Burgas
Rositsa (Polikraishte)	Polikraishte	5 Level - B OFG	North-West	B OFG Veliko Tarnovo
Rositsa (Stokite)	Stokite	5 Level - B OFG	North-West	B OFG Gabrovo
Rudanovski	Konstantin	5 Level - B OFG	North-West	B OFG Veliko Tarnovo
Rudnichar (Bela voda)	Pernik	4 Level - A OFG	South-West	A OFG Pernik - North
Ruen (Bogoslov)	Bogoslov	4 Level - A OFG	South-West	A OFG Kyustendil - Osogovo
Ruen 2008 (Ruen)	Ruen	Does Not Participate		
Rusokastro	Rusokastro	4 Level - A OFG	South-East	A OFG Burgas
Sadovo (Sadovo - Plovdiv)	Sadovo	5 Level - B OFG	South-East	B OFG Plovdiv - East
Sadovo (Sadovo - Blagoevgrad)	Sadovo	4 Level - A OFG	South-West	A OFG Blagoevgrad - Mesta East
Sakarski sportist	Topolovgrad	4 Level - A OFG	South-East	A OFG Haskovo
Samovodene	Samovodene	5 Level - B OFG	North-West	B OFG Veliko Tarnovo
Samuil	Samuilovo	4 Level - A OFG	South-East	A OFG Sliven
Santos	Dolno Belotintsi	4 Level - A OFG	North-West	A OFG Montana
Sarata	Dolni Rakovets	4 Level - A OFG	South-West	A OFG Pernik - South
Saraya	Saraya	4 Level - A OFG	South-West	A OFG Pazardzhik
Sveti Vlas	Sveti Vlas	5 Level - B OFG	South-East	B OFG Burgas - East
Sveti Vlas 08	Sveti Vlas	5 Level - B OFG	South-East	B OFG Burgas - East
Sveti Nikola	Burgas	4 Level - A OFG	South-East	A OFG Burgas
Svetkavitsa (Banite)	Banite	Does Not Participate		
Svetkavitsa (Kralevo)	Kralevo	Does Not Participate		
Svetkavitsa (Manolsko Konare)	Manolsko Konare	5 Level - B OFG	South-East	B OFG Plovdiv - East
Svetkavitsa (Medovene)	Medovene	4 Level - A OFG	North-East	A OFG Razgrad - East
Svetkavitsa (Mitino)	Mitino	4 Level - A OFG	South-West	A OFG Blagoevgrad - Struma 2
Svetkavitsa (Mihaltsi)	Mihaltsi	4 Level - A OFG	North-West	A OFG Veliko Tarnovo - North
Svetkavitsa (Sinitovo)	Sinitovo	4 Level - A OFG	South-West	A OFG Pazardzhik
Svetkavitsa 2004 (Gyulyovitsa)	Gyulyovitsa	Does Not Participate		
Svetkavitsa (Targovishte)	Targovishte	3 Level - V Group	North-East	North-East V AFG
Svetlina	Cherkovina	Does Not Participate		
Svetlya 2000	Svetlya	4 Level - A OFG	South-West	A OFG Pernik - South
Svetoslav	Lepitsa	4 Level - A OFG	South-West	A OFG Pleven
Svoboda (Milkovitsa)	Milkovitsa	5 Level - B OFG	North-West	B OFG Pleven - Center
Svoboda 2011 (Peshtera)	Peshtera	4 Level - A OFG	South-West	A OFG Pazardzhik
Svrakite	Galabnik	4 Level - A OFG	South-West	A OFG Pernik - South
Seydol	Seydol	Does Not Participate		
Sekirovo	Rakovski	4 Level - A OFG	South-East	A OFG Plovdiv
Seliyak	Stubel	5 Level - B OFG	North-West	B OFG Montana
Seltik	Ovcharovo	4 Level - A OFG	North-East	A OFG Targovishte
Septemvri (Glozhene)	Glozhene	4 Level - A OFG	North-West	A OFG Vratsa - North
Septemvri (Gradets)	Gradets	4 Level - A OFG	North-West	A OFG Vidin
Septemvri (Kravoder)	Kravoder	Does Not Participate		
Septemvri (Medkovets)	Medkovets	4 Level - A OFG	North-West	A OFG Montana
Septemvri (Simitli)	Simitli	Does Not Participate		
Septemvri (Sofia)	Sofia	3 Level - V Group	South-West	South-West V AFG
Septemvri 2005 (Zhabokrat)	Zhabokrat	4 Level - A OFG	South-West	A OFG Kyustendil - Osogovo
Septemvri 2009 (Lehchevo)	Lehchevo	4 Level - A OFG	North-West	A OFG Montana
Septemvri 98 (Tervel)	Tervel	3 Level - V Group	North-East	North-East V AFG
Silistra 2009	Silistra	3 Level - V Group	North-East	North-East V AFG
Sini vir	Tsonevo	Does Not Participate		
Sinite izvori	Gorna Grashtitsa	4 Level - A OFG	South-West	A OFG Kyustendil - Osogovo
Sinya voda	Sinya voda	Does Not Participate		
Sion	Kableshovo	5 Level - B OFG	South-East	B OFG Burgas - East
Sitalk	Starosel	5 Level - B OFG	South-East	B OFG Plovdiv - North-West
Sitomir	Nikopol	3 Level - V Group	North-West	North-West V AFG
Skala (Bov railway station)	Bov railway station	Does Not Participate		
Skala (Zverino)	Zverino	4 Level - A OFG	North-West	A OFG Vratsa - South
Skala (Kamen)	Kamen	Does Not Participate		
Skalite	Ruse	Does Not Participate		
Skrita sila	Madrevo	4 Level - A OFG	North-East	A OFG Razgrad - East
Slava	Sevar	4 Level - A OFG	North-East	A OFG Razgrad - East
Slavi mes (Goznitsa)	Lovech	Does Not Participate		
Slavilov	Targovishte	Does Not Participate		
Slaviya (Asenovtsi)	Asenovtsi	5 Level - B OFG	North-West	B OFG Pleven - East
Slaviya (Granitsa)	Granitsa	4 Level - A OFG	South-West	A OFG Kyustendil - Osogovo
Slaviya (Novachene)	Novachene	5 Level - B OFG	North-West	B OFG Pleven - East
Slaviya (Novo selo)	Novo selo	Does Not Participate		
Slaviya (Hadzhievo)	Hadzhievo	4 Level - A OFG	South-West	A OFG Pazardzhik
Slaviya 1913 (Sofia)	Sofia	1 Level - A Group	South-West	A PFG
Slaviya 2000 (Yahinovo)	Yahinovo	3 Level - V Group	South-East	South-East V AFG
Slashten 2007	Slashten	4 Level - A OFG	South-West	A OFG Blagoevgrad - Mesta East
Sliven 2000	Sliven	3 Level - V Group	South-East	South-East V AFG
Slivnishki geroy	Slivnitsa	3 Level - V Group	South-West	South-West V AFG
Smirnenski	Smirnenski	4 Level - A OFG	North-East	A OFG Ruse - East
Smolyan 2000	Smolyan	Does Not Participate		
Smolyanovtsi	Smolyanovtsi	Does Not Participate		
Smyadovo 2010	Smyadovo	4 Level - A OFG	North-East	A OFG Shumen - South
Sozopol	Sozopol	3 Level - V Group	South-East	South-East V AFG
Sokol Benkovski	Sofia	5 level - B OFG	South-West	B OFG Sofia
Sokol (Karavelevo)	Karavelevo	Does Not Participate		
Sokol (Dolni Voden)	Asenovgrad	4 Level - A OFG	South-East	A OFG Plovdiv
Sokol (Krislovo)	Krislovo	5 Level - B OFG	South-East	B OFG Plovdiv - North-West
Sokol (Markovo)	Markovo	4 Level - A OFG	South-East	A OFG Plovdiv
Sokol (Negovan)	Negovan	5 Level - B OFG	South-West	B OFG Sofia - city
Sokol (Poroy)	Poroy	5 Level - B OFG	South-East	B OFG Burgas - East
Sokol (Padarsko)	Padarsko	4 Level - A OFG	South-East	A OFG Plovdiv
Sokol (Samoranovo)	Samoranovo	4 Level - A OFG	South-West	A OFG Kyustendil - Rila
Sokol (Treskavets)	Treskavets	4 Level - A OFG	North-East	A OFG Targovishte
Sokol (Chervena voda)	Chervena voda	4 Level - A OFG	North-East	A OFG Ruse - East
Spartak Zarnevo	Zarnevo	4 Level - A OFG	North-East	A OFG Dobrich - West
Sokol 2008 (Yabalchevo)	Yabalchevo	5 Level - B OFG	South-East	B OFG Burgas - West
Sokol 2009 (Elenino)	Elenino	Does Not Participate		
Sokol 2012 (Sokolovo)	Sokolovo	4 Level - A OFG	North-East	A OFG Dobrich - East
Soley 97 (Kalkas)	Pernik	4 Level - A OFG	South-West	A OFG Pernik - North
Sparta (Burgas)	Burgas	5 Level - B OFG	South-East	B OFG Burgas - South
Spartak (Boshulya)	Boshulya	5 Level - B OFG	South-West	B OFG Pazardzhik - North
Spartak (Bazan)	Bazan	Does Not Participate		
Spartak (Byala)	Byala	4 Level - A OFG	South-East	A OFG Sliven
Spartak (Kalugerovo)	Kalugerovo	Does Not Participate		
Spartak (Koynare)	Koynare	4 Level - A OFG	North-West	A OFG Pleven
Spartak (Novo selo)	Novo selo	5 Level - B OFG	South-East	B OFG Plovdiv - South-West
Spartak (Peshtera)	Peshtera	Does Not Participate		
Spartak (Podgumer)	Podgumer	4 Level - A OFG	South-West	A OFG Sofia - city
Spartak (Samokov)	Samokov	4 Level - A OFG	South-East	A OFG Sofia - East
Spartak (Sklave)	Sklave	4 Level - A OFG	South-West	A OFG Blagoevgrad - Struma 1
Spartak (Sliven)	Sliven	4 Level - A OFG	South-East	A OFG Sliven
Spartak (Sofia)	Sofia	Does Not Participate		
Spartak (Trivoditsi)	Trivoditsi	Does Not Participate		
Spartak (Tarnava)	Tarnava	5 Level - B OFG	South-East	B OFG Yambol
Spartak 1918 (Varna)	Varna	2 Level - B Group	North-East	B PFG
Spartak 2001 (Pirdop)	Pirdop	Does Not Participate		
Spartak 2004 (Dolno Dryanovo)	Dolno Dryanovo	4 Level - A OFG	South-West	A OFG Blagoevgrad - Mesta West
Spartak 2008 (Izbeglii)	Izbeglii	5 Level - B OFG	South-East	B OFG Plovdiv - South-West
Spartak Pleven	Pleven	3 Level - V Group	North-West	North-West V AFG
Spartak-S94 (Plovdiv)	Plovdiv	3 Level - V Group	South-East	South-East V AFG
Spoting	Benkovski	5 Level - B OFG	South-East	B OFG Plovdiv - North-West
Sportist (Baniska)	Baniska	4 Level - A OFG	North-East	A OFG Ruse - West
Sportist (Bata)	Bata	Does Not Participate		
Sportist (Beli izvor)	Beli izvor	Does Not Participate		
Sportist (Blagovo)	Blagovo	5 Level - B OFG	North-West	B OFG Montana
Sportist (Golyam chardak)	Golyam chardak	4 Level - A OFG	South-East	A OFG Plovdiv
Sportist (Dobrich)	Dobrich	4 Level - A OFG	South-East	A OFG Haskovo
Sportist (Dragievo)	Dragievo	4 Level - A OFG	South-West	A OFG Pernik - North
Sportist (Kaynkardzha)	Kaynardzha	4 Level - A OFG	North-East	A OFG Silistra - West
Sportist (Knizhovnik)	Knizhovnik	Does Not Participate		
Sportist (Koozarevets)	Kozarevets	4 Level - A OFG	North-West	A OFG Veliko Tarnovo - South
Sportist (Mihalich)	Mihalich	4 Level - A OFG	North-East	A OFG Varna - North
Sportist (Petko Slaveykov)	Petko Slaveykov	5 Level - B OFG	North-West	B OFG Gabrovo
Sportist (Preslavtsi)	Preslavtsi	4 Level - A OFG	North-East	A OFG Silistra - West
Sportist (Roza)	Roza	Does Not Participate		
Sportist (Slokoshtitsa)	Slokoshtitsa	4 Level - A OFG	South-West	A OFG Kyustendil - Osogovo
Sportist (Stefanovo)	Stefanovo	4 Level - A OFG	North-East	A OFG Dobrich - West
Sportist (Struma-Lebnitsa)	Lebnitsa	Does Not Participate		
Sportist (Yabalkovo)	Yabalkovo	4 Level - A OFG	South-West	A OFG Kyustendil - Osogovo
Sportist 2006 (Dragovishtitsa)	Dragovishtitsa	4 Level - A OFG	South-West	A OFG Sofia - West
Sportist 2010 (Kapitan Dimitrievo)	Kapitan Dimitrievo	5 Level - B OFG	South-West	B OFG Pazardzhik - South
Sportist 2011 (General Toshevo)	General Toshevo	4 Level - A OFG	North-East	A OFG Dobrich - East
Sportist 2012 (Svoge)	Svoge	3 Level - V Group	South-West	South-West V AFG
Sportist Ozren (Golyam izvor)	Golyam izvor	4 Level - A OFG	North-West	A OFG Lovech
Sprint	Belogradets	4 Level - A OFG	North-East	A OFG Varna - North
Srednogorets	Brezovo	5 Level - B OFG	South-East	B OFG Plovdiv - North-West
Stambolovo	Stambolovo	Does Not Participate		
Stan	Stan	4 Level - A OFG	North-East	A OFG Shumen - South
Standart	Shivachevo	4 Level - A OFG	South-East	A OFG Sliven
Stara Zagora	Stara Zagora	4 Level - A OFG	South-East	A OFG Stara Zagora
Stara sila	Staro selishte	4 Level - A OFG	North-East	A OFG Razgrad - North
Starchevo 2010	Starchevo	4 Level - A OFG	South-West	A OFG Blagoevgrad - Struma 2
Stefan Karadzha	Srem	4 Level - A OFG	South-East	A OFG Haskovo
Stefanovo	Stefanovo	Does Not Participate		
Stobi	Stob	Does Not Participate		
Stolipinovo	Plovdiv	Does Not Participate		
Storgoziya	Pleven	4 Level - A OFG	North-West	A OFG Pleven
Strazhitsa 2012	Strazhitsa	4 Level - A OFG	North-East	A OFG Dobrich - East
Straldzha	Straldzha	3 Level - V Group	South-East	South-East V AFG
Strandzha (Malko Tarnovo)	Malko Tarnovo	5 Level - B OFG	South-East	B OFG Burgas - South
Strandzha 2010 (Sredets)	Sredets	4 Level - A OFG	South-East	A OFG Burgas
Strandzhanets	Tsarevo	4 Level - A OFG	South-East	A OFG Burgas
Strela (Dobroslavtsi)	Dobroslavtsi	Does Not Participate		
Strela (Dabnik)	Dabnik	Does Not Participate		
Strela (Obedinenie)	Obedinenie	5 Level - B OFG	North-West	B OFG Veliko Tarnovo
Strela (Oresh)	Oresh	4 Level - A OFG	North-West	A OFG Veliko Tarnovo - North
Strela (Todorovo)	Todorovo	4 Level - A OFG	North-East	A OFG Razgrad - North
Strela (Shumata)	Shumata	5 Level - B OFG	North-West	B OFG Gabrovo
Strela 2003 (Valkosel)	Valkoisel	4 Level - A OFG	South-West	A OFG Blagoevgrad - Mesta East
Strela 2004 (Orlyak)	Orlyak	4 Level - A OFG	North-East	A OFG Dobrich - West
Stroitel (Kunino)	Kunino	4 Level - A OFG	North-West	A OFG Vratsa - South
Stroitel (Sofia)	Sofia	Does Not Participate		
Struma (Kralev dol)	Kralev dol	4 Level - A OFG	South-West	A OFG Pernik - North
Struma (Marikostinovo)	Marikostinovo	4 Level - A OFG	South-West	A OFG Blagoevgrad - Struma 1
Struma (Novi chiflik)	Novi chiflik	4 Level - A OFG	South-West	A OFG Kyustendil - Osogovo
Struma 2005 (Strumyani)	Strumyani	Does Not Participate		
Strumska slava 1927 (Radomir)	Radomir	3 Level - V Group	South-West	South-West V AFG
Strumska slava 1956 (Tarnovlag)	Tarnovlag	4 Level - A OFG	South-West	A OFG Kyustendil - Osogovo
Strumski sokol (Kalishte)	Kalishte	4 Level - A OFG	South-West	A OFG Pernik - South
Stryama 2001	Stryama	5 Level - B OFG	South-East	B OFG Plovdiv - East
Studena	Studena	4 Level - A OFG	South-West	A OFG Pernik - West
Suvorovo 1	Suvorovo	3 Level - V Group	North-East	North-East V AFG
Sungularska dolina	Sungulare	5 Level - B OFG	South-East	B OFG Burgas - West
Saedinenie	Saedinenie	5 Level - B OFG	South-East	B OFG Burgas - West
Timok	Bregovo	4 Level - A OFG	North-West	A OFG Vidin
Titan	Lesnovo	Does Not Participate		
Ticha (Varna)	Varna	Does Not Participate		
Ticha 1948 (Dolni chiflik)	Dolni chiflik	3 Level - V Group	North-East	North-East V AFG
Toplika 1977	Mineralni bani	4 Level - A OFG	South-East	A OFG Haskovo
Topoli 2010	Topoli	4 Level - A OFG	North-East	A OFG Varna - South
Topolite 2005	Topolchane	Does Not Participate		
Topolovo	Topolovo	5 Level - B OFG	South-East	B OFG Plovdiv - South-West
Topchiysko	Topchiysko	5 Level - B OFG	South-East	B OFG Burgas - Center
Tornado	Bezden	4 Level - A OFG	South-West	A OFG Sofia - West
Torpedo (Kosovo)	Kosovo	Does Not Participate		
Torpedo (Pleven)	Pleven	Does Not Participate		
Torpedo 2004 (Borovan)	Borovan	Does Not Participate		
Trakiets (Govedare)	Govedare	Does Not Participate		
Trakiets (Isperihovo)	Isperihovo	5 Level - B OFG	South-West	B OFG Pazardzhik - South
Trakiets (Katunitsa)	Katunitsa	5 Level - B OFG	South-East	B OFG Plovdiv - South-West
Trakiets (Kukorevo)	Kukorevo	4 Level - A OFG	South-East	A OFG Yambol
Trakiets 2001 (Kalekovets)	Kalekovets	5 Level - B OFG	South-East	B OFG Plovdiv - North-West
Trakiets 2005 (Glavinitsa)	Glavinitsa	5 Level - B OFG	South-West	B OFG Pazardzhik - South
Trakite	Skutare	5 Level - B OFG	South-East	B OFG Plovdiv - North-West
Trakiya (Pazardzhik)	Pazardzhik	4 Level - A OFG	South-West	A OFG Pazardzhik
Trakiya (Tsarimir)	Tsarimir	5 Level - B OFG	South-East	B OFG Plovdiv - North-West
Trakiya 06 (Stamboliyski)	Stamboliyski	4 Level - A OFG	South-East	A OFG Plovdiv
Trakiya 1948 (Lozen)	Lozen	5 Level - B OFG	South-West	B OFG Pazardzhik - South
Trakiya 2008 (Novi izvor)	Novi izvor	5 Level - B OFG	South-East	B OFG Plovdiv - North-West
Trakiya 2012 (Byala reka)	Byala reka	5 Level - B OFG	South-East	B OFG Plovdiv - East
Trapishte	Trapishte	4 Level - A OFG	North-East	A OFG Razgrad - West
Trud	Trud	5 Level - B OFG	South-East	B OFG Plovdiv - North-West
Trastenik 2009	Dolna Mitropoliya	4 Level - A OFG	North-West	A OFG Pleven
Trastikovo	Trastikovo	4 Level - A OFG	North-West	A OFG Varna - South
Tryavna	Tryavna	3 Level - V Group	North-West	North-West V AFG
Tuzlushka slava	Antonovo	4 Level - A OFG	North-East	A OFG Targovishte
Tundzha (Veselinovo)	Veselinovo	4 Level - A OFG	South-East	A OFG Yambol
Tundzha 1915(Yambol)	Yambol	3 Level - V Group	South-East	South-East V AFG
Tundzha 2006 (Tenevo)	Tenevo	Does Not Participate		
Tundzha 2006 (Yagoda)	Yagoda	4 Level - A OFG	South-East	A OFG Stara Zagora
Tundzha 2007 (Zhelyo voyvoda)	Zhelyo voyvoda	4 Level - A OFG	South-East	A OFG Sliven
Tundzha 2009 (Mechkarevo)	Mechkarevo	4 Level - A OFG	South-East	A OFG Sliven
Tundzha 2010 (Koprinka)	Koprinka	4 Level - A OFG	South-East	A OFG Stara Zagora
Tundzha sport	Elhovo	Does Not Participate		
Udar (Byala cherkva)	Byala cherkva	Does Not Participate		
Udar 99 (Petko Karavelovo)	Petko Karavelovo	Does Not Participate		
Udarnik	Irechekovo	5 Level - B OFG	South-East	B OFG Yambol
Uragan (Boyadzhik)	Boyadzhik	4 Level - A OFG	South-East	A OFG Yambol
Uragan (Bazovets)	Bazovets	4 Level - A OFG	North-East	A OFG Ruse - West
Uragan (Vladimir)	Vladimir	Does Not Participate		
Uragan (Getsovo)	Getsovo	4 Level - A OFG	North-East	A OFG Razgrad - West
Uragan (Manastirtsi)	Manastirtsi	Does Not Participate		
Uragan (Patresh)	Patresh	Does Not Participate		
Uragan (Mihnevo)	Mihnevo	4 Level - A OFG	South-West	A OFG Blagoevgrad - Struma 2
Uragan 1970 (Gorno Draglishte)	Gorno Draglishte	4 Level - A OFG	South-West	A OFG Blagoevgrad - Bistritsa
Urvich (Pancharevo)	Pancharevo	5 Level - B OFG	South-West	B OFG Sofia - city
Urvich 1960 (Dolni Pasarel)	Dolni Pasarel	4 Level - A OFG	South-West	A OFG Sofia - city
Urozhay (Balgarovo)	Balgarovo	5 Level - B OFG	South-East	B OFG Burgas - South
Urozhay (Garchinovo)	Garchinovo	4 Level - A OFG	North-East	A OFG Targovishte
Uruma	Haskovo	Does Not Participate		
Ustrem (Belodol)	Belodol	Does Not Participate		
Ustrem (Dropla)	Dropla	4 Level - A OFG	North-East	A OFG Dobrich - East
Ustrem (Karamanite)	Karamanite	4 Level - A OFG	North-East	A OFG Varna - North
Ustrem (Kreta)	Kreta	5 Level - B OFG	North-West	B OFG Pleven - Center
Ustrem (Maslarevo)	Maslarevo	5 Level - B OFG	North-West	B OFG Veliko Tarnovo
Ustrem (Pet mogili)	Pet mogili	4 Level - A OFG	North-East	A OFG Shumen - North
Ustrem (Trem)	Trem	4 Level - A OFG	North-East	A OFG Shumen - North
Ustrem (Rakovski)	Rakovski	4 Level - A OFG	North-East	A OFG Razgrad - West
Ustrem D (Donchevo)	Donchevo	4 Level - A OFG	North-East	A OFG Dobrich - West
Ustrem (Tankovo)	Tankovo	5 Level - B OFG	South-East	B OFG Burgas - East
Feniksi	Varna	Does Not Participate		
Hadzhi Dimitar	Hadzhidimitrovo	Does Not Participate		
Haydut	Erden	4 Level - A OFG	North-West	A OFG Montana
Han Kardam	Kardam	Does Not Participate		
Hanovete	Isperih	4 Level - A OFG	North-East	A OFG Razgrad - North
Haskovo 2009	Haskovo	2 Level - B Group	South-East	B PFG
Hebros 1921	Harmanli	Does Not Participate		
Hebar	Pazardzhik	Does Not Participate		
Helga	Dolna Mitropoliya	Does Not Participate		
Himik	Dimitrovgrad	Does Not Participate		
Hristo Botev (Stozher)	Stozher	4 Level - A OFG	North-East	A OFG Dobrich - West
Hristo Botev (Cheshnegirovo)	Cheshnegirovo	5 Level - B OFG	South-East	B OFG Plovdiv - East
Tserovo 2006	Tserovo	4 Level - A OFG	South-West	A OFG Sofia - West
CeSeKa	Lesicheri	Does Not Participate		
CSKA	Sofia	1 Level - A Group	South-West	A PFG
CSKA 1948	Sofia	1 Level - A Group	South-West	A PFG
Chavdar (Brashlyanitsa)	Brashlyanitsa	5 Level - B OFG	North-West	B OFG Pleven - Center
Chavdar (Byala Slatina)	Byala Slatina	Does Not Participate		
Chavdar (Etropole)	Etropole	Does Not Participate		
Chavdar (Divdyadovo)	Shumen	4 Level - A OFG	North-East	A OFG Shumen - South
Chavdar (Kovachite)	Kovachite	Does Not Participate		
Chavdar (Sadovets)	Sadovets	5 Level - B OFG	North-West	B OFG Pleven - West
Chavdar (Troyan)	Troyan	Does Not Participate		
Chayka Konush 2000	Konush	5 Level - B OFG	South-East	B OFG Plovdiv - South-West
Chargan	Chargan	4 Level - A OFG	South-East	A OFG Yambol
Chardafon 1919	Gabrovo	4 Level - A OFG	North-West	A OFG Gabrovo
Chelnik	Reselets	Does Not Participate		
Chelsi	Brestovene	4 Level - A OFG	North-East	A OFG Razgrad - East
Chepinets	Velingrad	3 Level - V Group	South-West	South-West V AFG
Chepintsi	Chepintsi	Does Not Participate		
Chervena zvezda (Glava)	Glava	4 Level - A OFG	North-West	A OFG Pleven
Chervena zvezda (Kamenets)	Kamennets	5 Level - B OFG	South-East	B OFG Yambol
Cherveno zname	Sofia	Does Not Participate		
Cherno more (Varna)	Varna	1 Level - A Group	North-East	A PFG
Chernno more (Topola)	Topola	Does Not Participate		
Cherno more (Cherno more)	Cherno more	5 Level - B OFG	South-East	B OFG Burgas - South
Chernogorets 1946	Noevtsi	4 Level - A OFG	South-West	A OFG Pernik - West
Chernozem	Chernozemen	4 Level - A OFG	South-East	A OFG Plovdiv
Chernolik	Chernolik	4 Level - A OFG	North-East	A OFG Silistra - East
Chernolomets (Gorsko Albanovo)	Gorsko Albanovo	Does Not Participate		
Chernolomets (Ostritsa)	Ostritsa	4 Level - A OFG	North-East	A OFG Ruse - West
Chernolomets 04 (Popovo)	Popovo	Does Not Participate		
Chernomorets (Balchik)	Balchik	3 Level - V Group	North-East	North-East V AFG
Chernomorets (Burgas)	Burgas	1 Level - A Group	South-East	A PFG
Chernomorets (Nesebar)	Nesebar	5 Level - B OFG	South-East	B OFG Burgas - East
Chernomorets (Pomorie)	Pomorie	Does Not Participate		
Chernomorets (Chernevo)	Chernevo	4 Level - A OFG	North-East	A OFG Varna - North
Chernomorets 2003 (Byala - Varna)	Byala	3 Level - V Group	North-East	North-East V AFG
Chernomorski sportist	Obzor	4 Level - A OFG	South-East	A OFG Burgas
Chiko	Byaga	4 Level - A OFG	South-West	A OFG Pazardzhik
Chirakman	Seltse	4 Level - A OFG	North-East	A OFG Dobrich - East
Chirpan	Chirpan	4 Level - A OFG	South-East	A OFG Stara Zagora
Chorni 1920	Breznik	4 Level - A OFG	South-West	A OFG Pernik - West
Chudomi	Chudomir	4 Level - A OFG	North-East	A OFG Razgrad - West
Chumerna	Elena	4 Level - A OFG	North-West	A OFG Veliko Tarnovo - South
Shabla	Shabla	Does Not Participate		
Sherba	Grozdyovo	4 Level - A OFG	North-East	A OFG Varna - South
Shipka (Dragor)	Dragor	5 Level - B OFG	South-West	B OFG Pazardzhik - North
Shipka 1955 (Malo Konare)	Malo Konare	4 Level - A OFG	South-West	A OFG Pazardzhik
Shipchenski sokol	Varna	Does Not Participate		
Shumen 1929	Shumen	3 Level - V Group	North-East	North-East V AFG
Shumen 2010	Shumen	3 Level - V Group	North-East	North-East V AFG
Shurdanitsa	Georgi Damyanovo	4 Level - A OFG	North-West	A OFG Montana
Yuventus	Malchika	4 Level - A OFG	North-West	A OFG Pleven
Yudelnik	Yudelnik	4 Level - A OFG	North-East	A OFG Ruse - East
Yunak (Kormyansko)	Kormyansko	4 Level - A OFG	North-West	A OFG Gabrovo
Yunak (Merdanya)	Merdanya	5 Level - B OFG	North-West	B OFG Veliko Tarnovo
Yunak (Yunatsite)	Yunatsite	Does Not Participate		
Yunak 2000 (Ardino)	Ardino	4 Level - A OFG	South-East	A OFG Kardzhali
Yustina	Ustina	Does Not Participate		
Yakov	Yavornitsa	4 Level - A OFG	South-West	A OFG Blagoevgrad - Struma 2
Yakoruda 2007	Yakoruda	Does Not Participate		
Yambol 2004	Yambol	Does Not Participate		
Yankovo	Yankovo	4 Level - A OFG	North-East	A OFG Shumen - South
Yantra (Dolna Studena)	Dolna Studena	4 Level - A OFG	North-East	A OFG Ruse - West
Yantra (Draganovo)	Draganovo	4 Level - A OFG	North-West	A OFG Veliko Tarnovo - South
Yantra (Polsi Trambesh)	Polski Trambesh	4 Level - A OFG	North-West	A OFG Veliko Tarnovo - North
Yantra (Tsonevo)	Tsonevo	4 Level - A OFG	North-East	A OFG Ruse - West
Yantra (Gabrovo)	Gabrovo	3 Level - V Group	North-West	North-West V AFG
Yantra 1919 (Gabrovo)	Gabrovo	4 Level - A OFG	North-West	A OFG Gabrovo
Yasen (Yasenovets)	Yasenovets	4 Level - A OFG	North-West	A OFG Razgrad - North
Yasen 2007 (Yasenkovo)	Yasenkovo	4 Level - A OFG	North-East	A OFG Shumen - North
Yastreb (Kosharitsa)	Kosharitsa	5 Level - B OFG	South-East	B OFG Burgas - East
Yastreb (Stratsin)	Stratsin	5 Level - B OFG	South-East	B OFG Burgas - Center
